= 2000–01 Celta de Vigo season =

Celta Vigo
2000–01 season
- President: Horacio Gomez
- Manager: Víctor Fernández
- Stadium: Balaidos
- La Liga: 6th (in UEFA Cup)
- Copa del Rey: Runners up
- UEFA Cup: Quarter-finals
- UEFA Intertoto Cup: Winners
- Top goalscorer: League: Catanha (16); All: Catanha (21)
Home colours	Away colours	Third colours

Celta de Vigo contested La Liga, Copa del Rey, the UEFA Cup and the UEFA Intertoto Cup. The season saw Celta win their first ever trophy, winning the Intertoto Cup, qualifying for the UEFA Cup in the process. Celta also reached the final of the Copa del Rey, where Real Zaragoza came out on top.

== Squad ==
Note: Flags indicate national team as defined under FIFA eligibility rules; some limited exceptions apply. Players may hold more than one non-FIFA nationality.

No.	Pos.	Nation	Player
1	GK	(Argentina) ARG	Pablo Cavallero
2	DF	(Spain) ESP	Juan Velasco
3	DF	(Spain) ESP	Rafael Berges
4	DF	(Argentina) ARG	Fernando Cáceres
5	MF	(Brazil) BRA	Everton Giovanella
6	MF	(Spain) ESP	Tomás
7	MF	(Brazil) BRA	Vágner
8	MF	(Russia) RUS	Valery Karpin
9	FW	(Spain) ESP	Pablo Couñago
10	MF	(Russia) RUS	Alexandr Mostovoi
11	MF	(Argentina) ARG	Gustavo López
12	MF	(Peru) PER	Juan José Jayo
13	GK	(Spain) ESP	José Manuel Pinto
14	DF	(Spain) ESP	Juanfran

No.	Pos.	Nation	Player
15	MF	(Brazil) BRA	Doriva
16	DF	(Spain) ESP	Francisco Noguerol
17	FW	(South Africa) RSA	Benni McCarthy
18	DF	(Spain) ESP	Pablo Coira
19	DF	(Federal Republic of Yugoslavia) YUG	Goran Đorović
20	MF	(Spain) ESP	Jesuli
21	DF	(Spain) ESP	Sergio
22	MF	(Brazil) BRA	Edu
23	DF	(Equatorial Guinea) EQG	Yago
24	FW	(Brazil) BRA	Catanha
25	DF	(Argentina) ARG	Eduardo Berizzo
26	GK	(Spain) ESP	Roberto
27	MF	(Spain) ESP	Jonathan Aspas
29	MF	(Spain) ESP	Borja Oubiña

=== Transfers ===
In
Pos.	Name	from	Type
FW	Catanha	Malaga CF	€14.42 million
MF	Vagner	AS Roma	€5.00 million
MF	Doriva	Sampdoria	€4.80 million
GK	Pablo Cavallero	Velez Sarsfield	€3.00 million
MF	Edu	São Paulo FC	
DF	Yago Alonso	Sporting Gijon	€1.80 million
DF	Eduardo Berizzo	Olympique Marseille	
MF	Jesuli	Sevilla CF	

Out
Pos.	Name	To	Type
MF	Claude Makelele	Real Madrid	€14.00 million
GK	Richard Dutruel	FC Barcelona	Free
MF	Albert Celades	Real Madrid	Free
DF	Nelson Vivas	Arsenal F.C.	loan ended
MF	Mazinho	Elche CF	Free
FW	Haim Revivo	Fenerbahce	Free
FW	Ivan Kaviedes	Real Valladolid	
DF	Adriano	SD Compostela	
MF	Bruno Caires	Sporting CP	
FW	Mario Turdó	Rennes	

==== Left club during season ====
Note: Flags indicate national team as defined under FIFA eligibility rules; some limited exceptions apply. Players may hold more than one non-FIFA nationality.

No.	Pos.	Nation	Player
12	MF	(Spain) ESP	Manolo (on loan at Osasuna)

=== La Liga ===
==== League table ====
Pos	Team	Pld	W	D	L	GF	GA	GD	Pts	Qualification or relegation
4	Barcelona	38	17	12	9	80	57	+23	63 (Note: VAL 0–1 BAR; BAR 3–2 VAL)	Qualification for the Champions League third qualifying round
5	Valencia	38	18	9	11	55	34	+21	63	Qualification for the UEFA Cup first round
6	Celta Vigo	38	16	11	11	51	49	+2	59	Qualification for the UEFA Cup first round
7	Villarreal	38	16	9	13	58	52	+6	57	
8	Málaga	38	16	8	14	60	61	−1	56	

Source: LFP
Rules for classification: 1st points; 2nd head-to-head points; 3rd head-to-head goal difference; 4th head-to-head goals scored; 5th goal difference; 6th number of goals scored; 7th Fair-play points

==== Results by round ====
Round	1	2	3	4	5	6	7	8	9	10	11	12	13	14	15	16	17	18	19	20	21	22	23	24	25	26	27	28	29	30	31	32	33	34	35	36	37	38
Ground	A	H	A	H	A	H	A	H	A	H	A	H	A	H	H	A	H	A	H	H	A	H	A	H	A	H	A	H	A	H	A	H	A	A	H	A	H	A
Result	W	W	W	L	D	L	W	L	W	L	D	L	D	L	D	L	L	L	D	W	D	W	D	D	W	W	W	W	W	L	W	D	W	L	D	W	W	D
Position	4	1	1	3	4	7	5	6	5	8	7	10	9	13	11	14	16	16	16	16	16	15	15	15	13	10	9	7	6	7	6	6	6	6	6	6	6	6

Source: Competitive Matches
A = Away; H = Home; W = Win; D = Draw; L = Loss; = 2001-02 UEFA Champions League group stage; = 2001-02 UEFA Champions League qualifying round; = 2001-02 UEFA Cup; = 2001-02 Segunda Division

=== Matches ===
10 September 2000 1	Osasuna	0–2	Celta Vigo
			Catanha 80'; Manolo 84'

17 September 2000 2	Celta Vigo	4–1	Real Sociedad
	G. López 33'; Catanha 36'; Mostovoi 37'; Jesuli 85'		de Pedro 80' (pen.)

24 September 2000 3	Celta Vigo	1–0	Espanyol
	Catanha 20'

1 October 2000 4	Rayo Vallecano	3–0	Celta Vigo
	de Quintana 15'; Mauro 87'; Míchel 90'

14 October 2000 5	Celta Vigo	1–1	Deportivo Alavés
	Karpin 5'		Javi Moreno 3'

22 October 2000 6	Real Oviedo	3–1	Celta Vigo
	Losada 15'; Oli 42' (pen.), 90'		Giovanella 71'

29 October 2000 7	Celta Vigo	2–1	Real Valladolid
	Karpin 34'; Edu 77'		Ćirić 90'

1 November 2000 8	Valencia	1–0	Celta Vigo
	Carew 66'

4 November 2000 9	Celta Vigo	1–0	Málaga
	Mostovoi 56'

12 November 2000 10	Athletic Bilbao	2–1	Celta Vigo
	Etxeberría 35'; Lacruz 51'		Tomás 37'

19 November 2000 11	Celta Vigo	1–1	Racing Santander
	G. López 5'		Cáceres 89' (o.g.)

26 November 2000 12	Deportivo	1–0	Celta Vigo
	Djalminha 77'

2 December 2000 13	Celta Vigo	3–3	Barcelona
	Catanha 8, 14, 27'		F. de Boer 18'; Kluivert 50, 62'

10 December 2000 14	Real Madrid	3–0	Celta Vigo
	Helguera 11'; Figo 34'; R. Carlos 60'

17 December 2000 15	Celta Vigo	2–2	Mallorca
	Catanha 14'; Đorović 77'		Ibagaza 24'; Olaizola 89'

20 December 2000 16	Numancia	4–2	Celta Vigo
	Caco Morán 6', 67' (pen.); Ojeda 26'; José Manuel 59'		Doriva 28'; Catanha 50'

7 January 2001 17	Celta Vigo	0–1	Las Palmas
			Oulare 12'

14 January 2001 18	Villarreal	2–0	Celta Vigo
	Unai 34'; Moisés 68'

21 January 2001 19	Celta Vigo	1–1	Real Zaragoza
	Catanha 18'		Vellisca 25'

28 January 2001 20	Celta Vigo	1–0	Osasuna
	Mostovoi 51'

4 February 2001 21	Real Sociedad	2–2	Celta Vigo
	Khokhlov 19'; Jankauskas 72'		Loren 74' (o.g.); Mostovoi 90'

11 February 2001 22	Espanyol	0–1	Celta Vigo
			Catanha 90'

18 February 2001 23	Celta Vigo	1–1	Rayo Vallecano
	Juanfran 33'		Ballesteros 29'

25 February 2001 24	Deportivo Alavés	2–2	Celta Vigo
	Javi Moreno 32'; Tomás 70' (o.g.)		Mostovoi 76'; Edu 89'

4 March 2001 25	Celta Vigo	1–0	Real Oviedo
	Catanha 61'

11 March 2001 26	Real Valladolid	1–2	Celta Vigo
	Fernando 1' (pen.)		G. López 64'; Catanha 69'

18 March 2001 27	Celta Vigo	3–2	Valencia
	Karpin 50' (pen.), 59' (pen.), 65'		Sánchez 30'; Vágner 89' (o.g.)

31 March 2001 28	Málaga	1–4	Celta Vigo
	Dely Valdés 45'		Jesuli 14'; Mostovoi 35' (pen.); Catanha 59, 67'

8 April 2001 29	Celta Vigo	2–1	Athletic Bilbao
	Catanha 44'; Vágner 68'		Yeste 88'

15 April 2001 30	Racing Santander	3–0	Celta Vigo
	Espina 17'; Regueiro 43'; Amavisca 45'

21 April 2001 31	Celta Vigo	2–1	Deportivo
	Đorović 59'; Mostovoi 69'		Valerón 54'

29 April 2001 32	Barcelona	1–1	Celta Vigo
	Gabri 30'		Mostovoi 5'

5 May 2001 33	Celta Vigo	3–0	Real Madrid
	Juanfran 9'; G. López 25'; Jesuli 90'

13 May 2001 34	Mallorca	2–0	Celta Vigo
	George 45, 90'

20 May 2001 35	Celta Vigo	1–1	Numancia
	G. López 75' (pen.)		Rosu 66'

26 May 2001 36	Las Palmas	0–1	Celta Vigo
			Berizzo 52'

10 June 2001 37	Celta Vigo	1–0	Villarreal
	Mostovoi 81' (pen.)

17 June 2001 38	Real Zaragoza	1–1	Celta Vigo
	Jamelli 60'		Catanha 52'

=== Copa del Rey ===
==== Quarterfinals ====
31 January 2001	RC Celta	3–1	RCD Mallorca	Vigo
21:15 CET	Gustavo López 51' (pen.) 69'; Cáceres 77'	Report (in Spanish)	Finidi 15'	Stadium: Balaídos; Attendance: 15,000; Referee: López Nieto

7 February 2001	RCD Mallorca	2–1	RC Celta	Palma de Mallorca
21:00 CET	Nadal 45'; Engonga 85' (pen.)	Report (in Spanish)	Catanha 74'	Stadium: Son Moix; Attendance: 20,000; Referee: Iturralde González

==== Semifinals ====
21 June 2001	RC Celta	3–1	FC Barcelona	Vigo
21:30 CET	Berizzo 45+3'; Mostovoi 51'; Jesuli 70'	Report (in Spanish)	Simão 6'	Stadium: Balaídos; Attendance: 26,000; Referee: Ansuátegui Roca

24 June 2001	FC Barcelona	1–1	Celta de Vigo	Barcelona
21:30 CET	Kluivert 4'	Report (in Spanish)	Berizzo 2'	Stadium: Camp Nou; Attendance: 26,000; Referee: Fernández Marín

==== Final ====
30 June 2001	Celta de Vigo	1–3	Real Zaragoza	Sevilla; Stadium: La Cartuja
21:00 CET	Mostovoi 5'	Report (in Spanish)	Aguado 23'; Jamelli 38' (pen.); Yordi 90+4'	Attendance: 38,000; Referee: José María García-Aranda (Community of Madrid)

=== UEFA Intertoto Cup ===
==== Quarterfinals ====
15 July 2000	Celta Vigo (Spain)	3–0	(North Macedonia) Pelister	Balaídos, Vigo
	McCarthy 30', 80'; Cáceres 78'			Attendance: 7,000; Referee: Goran Marić (Croatia)

22 July 2000	Pelister (North Macedonia)	1–2	(Spain) Celta Vigo	Stadion Tumbe Kafe, Bitola
	Momirovski 76'		Couñago 54'; Mena 62'	Attendance: 6,000; Referee: Attila Ábrahám (Hungary)

==== Semifinals ====
26 July 2000	RC Celta (Spain)	1–0	(England) Aston Villa	Balaídos, Vigo
21:30	McCarthy 89'	Report		Attendance: 9,550; Referee: Konrad Plautz (Austria)

2 August 2000	Aston Villa (England)	1–2	(Spain) RC Celta	The Hawthorns, West Bromwich
20:45	Barry 48' (pen.)	Report	McCarthy 11', 59'	Attendance: 11,909; Referee: Dieter Schoch (Switzerland)

==== Finals ====
8 August 2000	RC Celta (Spain)	2–1	(Russia) Zenit Saint Petersburg	Balaídos, Vigo
21:30	Karpin 22'; Juanfran 90+1'	Report	Igonin 8'	Attendance: 18,000; Referee: Herbert Fandel (Germany)

22 August 2000	Zenit Saint Petersburg (Russia)	2–2	(Spain) RC Celta	Petrovsky Stadium, Saint Petersburg
17:00	Popovych 30', 63'	Report	Karpin 83'; McCarthy 89'	Attendance: 22,000; Referee: Michel Piraeux (Belgium)

=== UEFA Cup ===
==== 1st round ====
14 September 2000	Celta Vigo (Spain)	0–0	(Croatia) Rijeka

28 September 2000	Rijeka (Croatia)	0–1 (AET)	(Spain) Celta Vigo
			Đorović 112'

==== 2nd round ====
26 October 2000	Crvena Zvezda (Federal Republic of Yugoslavia)	1–0	(Spain) Celta Vigo
	Drulić 62'

9 November 2000	Celta Vigo (Spain)	5–3	(Federal Republic of Yugoslavia) Crvena Zvezda
	McCarthy 22', 55'; G. López 49' (pen.), 65' (pen.); Catanha 70'		Drulić 15', 37', 90'

==== Round of 32 ====
23 November 2000	Shakhtar Donetsk (Ukraine)	0–0	(Spain) Celta Vigo

7 December 2000	Celta Vigo (Spain)	1–0	(Ukraine) Shakhtar Donetsk
	Catanha 28'

==== Eightfinals ====
15 February 2001	Stuttgart (Germany)	0–0	(Spain) Celta Vigo

22 February 2001	Celta Vigo (Spain)	2–1	(Germany) Stuttgart
	Karpin 6'; Mostovoi 84'		Blank 45'

==== Quarter-finals ====
8 March 2001	Barcelona (Spain)	2–1	(Spain) Celta Vigo
	Kluivert 13, 55'		Coira 68'

15 March 2001	Celta Vigo (Spain)	3–2	(Spain) Barcelona
	Catanha 33'; G. López 63' (pen.); Mostovoi 90'		Rivaldo 28, 42'

== Statistics ==
=== Players statistics ===
No.	Pos	Nat	Player	Total		La Liga		Copa del Rey		UEFA Cup	
No.	Pos	Nat	Player	Apps	Goals	Apps	Goals	Apps	Goals	Apps	Goals
1	GK	(Argentina) ARG	Cavallero	32	-35	21	-25	5	-6	6	-4
2	DF	(Spain) ESP	Velasco	47	0	33	0	6	0	7+1	0
4	DF	(Argentina) ARG	Caceres	54	1	36	0	7+1	1	10	0
14	DF	(Spain) ESP	Juanfran	42	2	26+2	2	7+1	0	6	0
8	MF	(Russia) RUS	Karpin	45	7	26+4	5	5+1	1	9	1
10	MF	(Russia) RUS	Mostovoi	43	13	25+5	9	6	2	7	2
5	MF	(Brazil) BRA	Giovanella	50	1	24+9	1	6+2	0	7+2	0
7	MF	(Brazil) BRA	Vágner	41	2	21+6	1	5+1	1	6+2	0
22	MF	(Brazil) BRA	Edu	44	5	20+11	3	3+6	2	0+4	0
11	MF	(Argentina) ARG	López	47	10	30+4	5	3+2	2	8	3
24	FW	(Brazil) BRA	Catanha	52	21	35+1	16	7	1	9	4
13	GK	(Spain) ESP	Pinto	26	-34	17+1	-24	4	-5	4	-5
19	DF	(Federal Republic of Yugoslavia) YUG	Djorovic	24	2	18+1	2	1	0	3+1	0
23	DF	(Equatorial Guinea) EQG	Yago	34	0	14+6	0	5+1	0	8	0
25	DF	(Argentina) ARG	Berizzo	28	3	16+1	0	6+1	3	4	0
20	MF	(Spain) ESP	Jesuli	38	3	7+17	2	4+2	1	1+7	0
15	MF	(Brazil) BRA	Doriva	26	1	14+3	1	4	0	4+1	0
17	FW	(South Africa) RSA	McCarthy	29	2	8+11	0	2+2	1	5+1	1
12	MF	(Peru) PER	Jayo	22	0	12+2	0	3+1	0	2+2	0
18	DF	(Spain) ESP	Coira	20	1	7+5	0	4+1	0	2+1	1
6	MF	(Spain) ESP	Tomás	19	2	4+7	1	4+1	1	0+3	0
12	MF	(Spain) ESP	Manolo	9	1	3+4	1	0	0	2	0
9	FW	(Spain) ESP	Couñago	12	0	0+8	0	2	0	0+2	0
16	DF	(Spain) ESP	Noguerol	6	0	1+3	0	0+1	0	0+1	0
3	DF	(Spain) ESP	Berges								
21	DF	(Spain) ESP	Sergio								
26	GK	(Spain) ESP	Roberto								
27	MF	(Spain) ESP	Aspas								
29	MF	(Spain) ESP	Oubiña								

- Source: https://www.bdfutbol.com/en/t/t2000-0111.html
