= 2003–04 Celta de Vigo season =

Celta de Vigo
2003–04 season
- Manager: Miguel Ángel Lotina; Radomir Antić; Ramón Carnero
- La Liga: 19th
- Copa del Rey: Quarter-finals
- Champions League: Round of 16
- Top goalscorer: Savo Milošević (14)
Home colours	Away colours	Third colours

Celta de Vigo contested La Liga, Copa del Rey and UEFA Champions League in the 2003–04 season. The side reached the last 16 of the Champions League in their competition debut, going out to Arsenal, but at the same time the league form suffered and Celta dropped beneath the relegation zone, from which the team could not recover, and having finished in the top half of the standings for the better part of a decade, Celta found themselves in Segunda División, which rendered several key players leaving.

== Squad ==
Squad at end of season

Note: Flags indicate national team as defined under FIFA eligibility rules; some limited exceptions apply. Players may hold more than one non-FIFA nationality.

No.	Pos.	Nation	Player
1	GK	ARG	Pablo Cavallero
2	DF	ESP	Juan Velasco
3	DF	BRA	Sylvinho
4	DF	ARG	Fernando Cáceres
5	MF	BRA	Everton Giovanella
6	DF	ARG	Eduardo Berizzo
7	MF	BRA	Vágner
8	MF	ESP	Ángel
9	FW	SCG	Savo Milosevic (on loan from Parma)
10	MF	RUS	Aleksandr Mostovoi
11	MF	ARG	Gustavo López
13	GK	ESP	José Manuel Pinto
14	DF	ESP	Juanfran
15	DF	CHI	Pablo Contreras
16	MF	ESP	José Ignacio

No.	Pos.	Nation	Player
17	DF	ARG	Sebastián Méndez
18	FW	CHI	Mauricio Pinilla (on loan from Internazionale)
19	MF	BRA	Edu
20	MF	ESP	Jesuli
21	MF	ESP	Jandro
22	MF	FRA	Peter Luccin
23	DF	ESP	Sergio
25	MF	SCG	Saša Ilić (on loan from Partizan Belgrade)
26	GK	ESP	José Juan
27	DF	ESP	Jorge Eugenio Rodríguez
28	MF	ESP	Borja Oubiña
29	MF	ESP	Jonathan Aspas
30	FW	ESP	Nacho Franco
31	DF	ESP	Iago Bouzón
36	DF	ESP	Israel

=== Left club during season ===
Note: Flags indicate national team as defined under FIFA eligibility rules; some limited exceptions apply. Players may hold more than one non-FIFA nationality.

No. / Pos. / Nation / Player; 12 / MF / ESP / Manolo (on loan to Tenerife)	No. / Pos. / Nation / Player; 24 / FW / ESP / Catanha (on loan to Krylia Sovetov)

== Results summary ==
=== La Liga ===
Overall								Home						Away					
Pld	W	D	L	GF	GA	GD	Pts	W	D	L	GF	GA	GD	W	D	L	GF	GA	GD
38	9	12	17	48	68	−20	39	4	4	11	16	38	−22	5	8	6	32	30	+2

== Competitions ==
=== La Liga ===
==== League table ====
Pos	Team	Pld	W	D	L	GF	GA	GD	Pts	Qualification or relegation
16	Espanyol	38	13	4	21	48	64	−16	43	
17	Racing Santander (Note: Racing Santander were docked one point deduction due to using foreign players exceeds the quota during a match against Osasuna on 14 December 2003.)	38	11	10	17	48	63	−15	42	
18	Valladolid (R)	38	10	11	17	46	56	−10	41	Relegation to the Segunda División
19	Celta Vigo (R)	38	9	12	17	48	68	−20	39	Relegation to the Segunda División
20	Murcia (R)	38	5	11	22	29	57	−28	26	Relegation to the Segunda División

Source: LFP
Rules for classification: 1st points; 2nd head-to-head points; 3rd head-to-head goal difference; 4th head-to-head goals scored; 5th goal difference; 6th number of goals scored; 7th Fair-play points
(R) Relegated

==== Matches ====
31 August 2003 1	Celta Vigo	1–1	Real Murcia
20:00 CEST	Milošević 31'		Luis García 74' (pen.)

2 September 2003 2	Real Sociedad	1–1	Celta Vigo
20:45 CEST	Kovačević 37'		Milošević 63'

13 September 2003 3	Celta Vigo	0–2	Real Betis
21:30 CEST			Assunção 37'; Fernando 86' (pen.)

21 September 2003 4	Villarreal	1–1	Celta Vigo
17:00 CEST	Berizzo 76' (o.g.)		Mostovoi 74'

27 September 2003 5	Celta Vigo	3–2	Real Valladolid
19:30 CEST	Jesuli 56'; Milošević 72'; Mostovoi 82'		Makukula 3', 49'

5 October 2003 6	Málaga	2–1	Celta Vigo
17:00 CEST	Sanz 14'; Miguel Ángel 79'		Milošević 70'

18 October 2003 7	Celta Vigo	0–2	Real Madrid
19:30 CEST			Ronaldo 24'; R. Carlos 65'

26 October 2003 8	Espanyol	0–4	Celta Vigo
17:00 CET			Luccin 16' (pen.); Milošević 59'; Mostovoi 77'; Jandro 89'

29 October 2003 9	Valencia	2–2	Celta Vigo
21:00 CET	Aimar 41'; Canobbio 67'		Berizzo 56'; Jesuli 65'

1 November 2003 10	Celta Vigo	0–1	Racing Santander
19:30 CET			Benayoun 2'

8 November 2003 11	Real Zaragoza	1–1	Celta Vigo
19:30 CET	Ponzio 7'		José Ignacio 4'

23 November 2003 12	Celta Vigo	0–2	Athletic Bilbao
17:00 CET			Lacruz 58'; Iraola 90'

29 November 2003 13	Sevilla	0–1	Celta Vigo
17:00 CET			Jesuli 34'

3 December 2003 14	Celta Vigo	2–2	Albacete
20:00 CET	José Ignacio 19'; Contreras 60'		Pacheco 45'; Aranda 54'

6 December 2003 15	Osasuna	3–2	Celta Vigo
19:30 CET	Aloisi 28', 49'; Bakayoko 74'		José Ignacio 37'; Catanha 90+2'

13 December 2003 16	Celta Vigo	2–2	Atlético Madrid
21:30 CET	Luccin 37'; Milošević 40'		Simeone 17'; Lequi 82'

21 December 2003 17	Barcelona	1–1	Celta Vigo
21:00 CET	Cocu 70'		Jesuli 17'

3 January 2004 18	Celta Vigo	0–5	Deportivo
21:30 CET			Luque 15'; Víctor 42', 71', 79'; Tristán 87'

10 January 2004 19	Mallorca	2–4	Celta Vigo
19:30 CET	Bruggink 12', 45' (pen.)		José Ignacio 16'; Jesuli 71'; Luccin 85' (pen.); Milošević 90+4'

17 January 2004 20	Real Murcia	2–2	Celta Vigo
19:30 CET	Quintana 68'; Karanka 81'		Luccin 7'; Milošević 45'

25 January 2004 21	Celta Vigo	2–5	Real Sociedad
17:00 CET	G. López 1'; Luccin 51' (pen.)		Kovačević 23'; Milošević 43' (o.g.); Alonso 60'; Nihat 70', 72'

31 January 2004 22	Real Betis	1–0	Celta Vigo
21:30 CET	Lembo 35'

8 February 2004 23	Celta Vigo	2–1	Villarreal
	Milošević 19', 48'		Anderson 84'

15 February 2004 24	Real Valladolid	0–2	Celta Vigo
			Mostovoi 46'; Jesuli 87'

21 February 2004 25	Celta Vigo	0–2	Málaga
			Salva 15' (pen.); D. Alonso 90+3'

29 February 2004 26	Real Madrid	4–2	Celta Vigo
19:00 CET	Ronaldo 54'; Zidane 64', 90+3'; Figo 73'		Ilić 17'; Milošević 90'

6 March 2004 27	Celta Vigo	1–5	Espanyol
	Edu 90+2'		Tamudo 30', 65' (pen.); Hadji 43'; Sergio 81' (o.g.); Vignal 87'

14 March 2004 28	Celta Vigo	0–2	Valencia
21:00 CET			Rufete 39', 90+3'

21 March 2004 29	Racing Santander	4–4	Celta Vigo
	Álvarez 18' (pen.), 82' (pen.); Javi Guerrero 38', 85'		Milošević 28', 72' (pen.); Mostovoi 46', 61'

28 March 2004 30	Celta Vigo	0–2	Real Zaragoza
			Álvaro 76'; Yordi 90+1'

4 April 2004 31	Athletic Bilbao	0–0	Celta Vigo

10 April 2004 32	Celta Vigo	0–0	Sevilla
22:00 CEST

18 April 2004 33	Albacete	0–2	Celta Vigo
			Juanfran 21'; G. López 46'	Referee: Pérez Lasa

25 April 2004 34	Celta Vigo	1–0	Osasuna
	Muñoz 48' (o.g.)

1 May 2004 35	Atlético Madrid	3–2	Celta Vigo
	Nano 1'; Torres 5'; García Calvo 38'		Milošević 31'; Edu 68'

8 May 2004 36	Celta Vigo	1–0	Barcelona
	Edu 42'

15 May 2004 37	Deportivo	3–0	Celta Vigo
	Sylvinho 12' (o.g.); Pandiani 23'; Munitis 24'

22 May 2004 38	Celta Vigo	1–2	Mallorca
	Jandro 90+2'		Nenê 89'; Perera 90+1'

=== Copa del Rey ===
==== Round of 32 ====
8 October 2003	Pontevedra CF	1-1*	Celta Vigo
	Manu Busto 6'		Jandro 41'

==== Round of 16 ====
17 December 2003	Celta Vigo	3-1	RCD Espanyol
	Jandro 50'; Jesuli 77'; Milošević 94'		Álex Fernández 71'

==== Round of 8 ====
7 January 2004 First leg	Málaga CF	0-1	Celta Vigo
			Vagner 34'

14 January 2004 Second leg	Celta Vigo	2-2	Málaga CF
	Vagner 60', 69'		Juanito 3'; Salva 68'

==== Quarter-finals ====
21 January 2004 First leg	Deportivo Alavés	4-2	Celta Vigo
	Rubén Navarro 21', 38', 51'; Magno 54'		Pinilla 8', 49'

28 January 2004 Second leg	Celta Vigo	1-0	Deportivo Alavés
	Gustavo López 68'

=== Champions League ===
==== Qualifying round ====
12 August 2003	Celta Vigo (Spain)	3–0	(Czech Republic) Slavia Praha	Spain
	Mostovoi 17'; Jesuli 50'; Edu 54'

27 August 2003	Slavia Prague (Czech Republic)	2–0	(Spain) Celta Vigo	Prague, Czech Republic
	Dostálek 18'; Hrdlička 30'

=== Group stage ===
16 September 2003 1	Club Brugge (Belgium)	1–1	(Spain) Celta Vigo	Bruges, Belgium
	Sæternes 83'		Juanfran 50'	Stadium: Jan Breydel Stadium

1 October 2003 2	Celta Vigo (Spain)	0–0	(Italy) Milan	Spain

22 October 2003 3	Ajax (Netherlands)	1–0	(Spain) Celta Vigo	Amsterdam, Netherlands
	Ibrahimović 53'			Stadium: Amsterdam Arena

5 November 2003 4	Celta Vigo (Spain)	3–2	(Netherlands) Ajax	Spain
	Luccin 25' (pen.); Milošević 39'; Vágner 63'		Sonck 53' van der Vaart 82'

26 November 2003 5	Celta Vigo (Spain)	1–1	(Belgium) Club Brugge	Spain
	Mostovoi 73'		Lange 90'

9 December 2003 6	Milan (Italy)	1–2	(Spain) Celta Vigo	Milan, Italy
	Kaká 41'		Jesuli 42'; José Ignacio 71'	Stadium: San Siro

=== Round of 16 ===
24 February 2004	Celta Vigo (Spain)	2–3	(England) Arsenal	Spain
	Edu Schmidt 27'; José Ignacio 64'		Edu 18', 58'; Pires 80'

10 March 2004	Arsenal (England)	2–0	(Spain) Celta Vigo	London, England
	Henry 14', 34'			Stadium: Highbury

== Top scorers ==
=== La Liga ===
- (Serbia and Montenegro) Savo Milošević 14
- (Russia) Alexandr Mostovoi 6
- (Spain) Jesuli 6
- (France) Peter Luccin 5

=== Copa del Rey ===
- (Brazil) Vagner 3
- (Spain) Jandro 2
- (Spain) Jesuli 2

=== Champions League ===
- (Russia) Alexandr Mostovoi 2
- (Spain) Jandro 2
- (Brazil) Edu 2
- (Spain) José Ignacio 2
