= 2001–02 Celta de Vigo season =

Celta Vigo
2001–02 season
- Manager: Víctor Fernández
- La Liga: 5th
- Copa del Rey: 2nd Round
- UEFA Cup: 2nd Round
- Top goalscorer: Catanha (17)
- Highest home attendance: 31,500
- Average home league attendance: 21,553
Home colours	Away colours	Third colours

Celta de Vigo participated in La Liga, Copa del Rey and the UEFA Cup. Finishing just shy of the UEFA Champions League positions, Celta failed to repeat their cup runs of previous seasons, dropping out of both Copa del Rey and the UEFA Cup in the second rounds.

== Squad ==
Note: Flags indicate national team as defined under FIFA eligibility rules; some limited exceptions apply. Players may hold more than one non-FIFA nationality.

No.	Pos.	Nation	Player
1	GK	(Argentina) ARG	Pablo Cavallero
2	DF	(Spain) ESP	Juan Velasco
3	DF	(Brazil) BRA	Sylvinho
4	DF	(Argentina) ARG	Fernando Cáceres
5	MF	(Brazil) BRA	Everton Giovanella
6	DF	(Argentina) ARG	Eduardo Berizzo
7	MF	(Brazil) BRA	Vágner
8	MF	(Russia) RUS	Valery Karpin
9	FW	(France) FRA	Florian Maurice
10	MF	(Russia) RUS	Alexandr Mostovoi
11	MF	(Argentina) ARG	Gustavo López
13	GK	(Spain) ESP	José Manuel Pinto

No.	Pos.	Nation	Player
14	DF	(Spain) ESP	Juanfran
15	MF	(Brazil) BRA	Doriva
17	DF	(Argentina) ARG	Sebastián Méndez
18	DF	(Spain) ESP	Pablo Coira
19	MF	(Brazil) BRA	Edu
20	MF	(Spain) ESP	Jesuli
21	DF	(Spain) ESP	Sergio
22	MF	(France) FRA	Peter Luccin
23	DF	(Equatorial Guinea) EQG	Yago
24	FW	(Spain) ESP	Catanha
26	GK	(Spain) ESP	Roberto
27	MF	(Spain) ESP	Jonathan Aspas

=== Left club during season ===
Note: Flags indicate national team as defined under FIFA eligibility rules; some limited exceptions apply. Players may hold more than one non-FIFA nationality.

No. / Pos. / Nation / Player; 16 / MF / (Croatia) CRO / Zvonimir Boban	No. / Pos. / Nation / Player; 17 / FW / (South Africa) RSA / Benni McCarthy (on loan to Porto)

=== La Liga ===
==== League table ====
Pos	Team	Pld	W	D	L	GF	GA	GD	Pts	Qualification or relegation
3	Real Madrid (Note: Real Madrid qualified directly for the 2002–03 UEFA Champions League as holders.)	38	19	9	10	69	44	+25	66	Qualification for the Champions League group stage
4	Barcelona	38	18	10	10	65	37	+28	64	Qualification for the Champions League third qualifying round
5	Celta Vigo	38	16	12	10	64	46	+18	60	Qualification for the UEFA Cup first round
6	Real Betis	38	15	14	9	42	34	+8	59	Qualification for the UEFA Cup first round
7	Alavés (Note: Since Deportivo and Real Madrid, finalists of 2001–02 Copa del Rey, were qualified for the 2002–03 UEFA Champions League, Alavés entered UEFA Cup as best qualified in no european places (7th placed))	38	17	3	18	41	44	−3	54	Qualification for the UEFA Cup first round

Source: LFP
Rules for classification: 1st points; 2nd head-to-head points; 3rd head-to-head goal difference; 4th head-to-head goals scored; 5th goal difference; 6th number of goals scored; 7th Fair-play points

==== Results by round ====
Round	1	2	3	4	5	6	7	8	9	10	11	12	13	14	15	16	17	18	19	20	21	22	23	24	25	26	27	28	29	30	31	32	33	34	35	36	37	38
Ground	A	H	A	H	A	H	A	H	A	H	A	H	A	H	H	A	H	A	H	H	A	H	A	H	A	H	A	H	A	H	A	H	A	A	H	A	H	A
Result	W	W	D	W	D	D	D	W	D	D	L	L	L	W	W	D	W	W	D	D	D	W	W	L	D	D	L	L	W	W	W	W	L	L	W	W	L	L
Position	2	1	1	1	3	4	4	2	2	3	4	6	8	8	6	6	5	3	4	3	4	2	1	2	3	4	6	7	6	5	4	4	5	5	5	5	5	5

Source: Competitive Matches
A = Away; H = Home; W = Win; D = Draw; L = Loss; = Leader, 2002-03 UEFA Champions League group stage; = 2002-03 UEFA Champions League group stage; = 2002-03 UEFA Champions League qualifying round; = 2002-03 UEFA Cup; = 2002-03 Segunda Division

=== Matches ===
26 August 2001 1	Osasuna	0–3	Celta Vigo
			Catanha 32'; Sergio 55'; Jesuli 71'

9 September 2001 2	Celta Vigo	3–0	Tenerife
	Catanha 32' (pen.); Mostovoi 36', 71' (pen.)

16 September 2001 3	Real Sociedad	0–0	Celta Vigo

23 September 2001 4	Celta Vigo	2–0	Mallorca
	Edu 41'; Catanha 85'

30 September 2001 5	Deportivo	2–2	Celta Vigo
	Juanfran 70' (o.g.); Pandiani 82'		Berizzo 23'; Edu 68'

4 October 2001 6	Celta Vigo	1–1	Valencia
	Maurice 48'		Sánchez 6'

7 October 2001 7	Málaga	2–2	Celta Vigo
	Musampa 7'; Dely Valdés 45'		Jesuli 5'; Karpin 10'

14 October 2001 8	Celta Vigo	3–1	Real Betis
	G. López 14'; Catanha 30'; Mostovoi 90' (pen.)		Calado 90'

21 October 2001 9	Real Madrid	1–1	Celta Vigo
	Guti 25'		Catanha 9'

28 October 2001 10	Celta Vigo	1–1	Real Valladolid
	Mostovoi 90'		Tote 51'

4 November 2001 11	Las Palmas	4–2	Celta Vigo
	Schürrer 1'; Tevenet 31'; Rubén 44, 90'		Jesuli 21'; Mostovoi 60' (pen.)

11 November 2001 12	Celta Vigo	2–3	Athletic Bilbao
	Cáceres 34'; Jesuli 80'		Karanka 83'; Etxeberría 87'; Orbaiz 90'

18 November 2001 13	Deportivo Alavés	1–0	Celta Vigo
	Pablo 5'

25 November 2001 14	Celta Vigo	4–1	Espanyol
	Catanha 24', 53'; Jesuli 37'; Edu 79'		Tamudo 19' (pen.)

2 December 2001 15	Celta Vigo	3–1	Villarreal
	Jesuli 8'; Edu 61', 62'		Guayre 58'

9 December 2001 16	Barcelona	2–2	Celta Vigo
	Gabri 2'; Saviola 48'		Sergi 73' (o.g.); Edu 84'

16 December 2001 17	Celta Vigo	2–0	Real Zaragoza
	Catanha 6'; G. López 75'

22 December 2001 18	Sevilla	0–1	Celta Vigo
			Catanha 58'

5 January 2002 19	Celta Vigo	2–2	Rayo Vallecano
	Catanha 53'; Edu 66'		Bolo 37'; Bolić 90'

13 January 2002 20	Celta Vigo	1–1	Osasuna
	Vágner 25'		Cruchaga 65'

20 January 2002 21	Tenerife	1–1	Celta Vigo
	Bino 27'		Catanha 72'

26 January 2002 22	Celta Vigo	3–1	Real Sociedad
	Mostovoi 59, 66'; Edu 90'		Khokhlov 22'

2 February 2002 23	Mallorca	0–1	Celta Vigo
			Jesuli 26'

5 February 2002 24	Celta Vigo	0–2	Deportivo
			Tristán 32, 65'

9 February 2002 25	Valencia	0–0	Celta Vigo

17 February 2002 26	Celta Vigo	0–0	Málaga

24 February 2002 27	Real Betis	4–1	Celta Vigo
	Denílson 25' (pen.); Rivas 37'; Ito 55'; Amato 89' (pen.)		Edu 67'

2 March 2002 28	Celta Vigo	0–1	Real Madrid
			Raúl 83'

10 March 2002 29	Real Valladolid	2–4	Celta Vigo
	Fernando 32', 69' (pen.)		Sergio 9'; Catanha 36', 49', 75'

17 March 2002 30	Celta Vigo	3–2	Las Palmas
	Catanha 21'; Mostovoi 38'; Karpin 77'		56'; Paqui 78'

24 March 2002 31	Athletic Bilbao	1–6	Celta Vigo
	Urzaiz 40'		Catanha 16'; Vágner 19'; Luccin 64'; Karpin 70'; Jesuli 76'; Maurice 83'

30 March 2002 32	Celta Vigo	3–1	Deportivo Alavés
	Vágner 53, 76'; Catanha 83'		Coloccini 90'

7 April 2002 33	Espanyol	2–0	Celta Vigo
	Palencia 23'; Tamudo 75'

14 April 2002 34	Villarreal	2–1	Celta Vigo
	Víctor 70', 76' (pen.)		Jesuli 62'

20 April 2002 35	Celta Vigo	2–1	Barcelona
	Mostovoi 29'; G. López 62'		Rivaldo 90'

28 April 2002 36	Real Zaragoza	0–1	Celta Vigo
			Jesuli 53'

5 May 2002 37	Celta Vigo	1–2	Sevilla
	Mostovoi 6'		Toedtli 20, 25'

11 May 2002 38	Rayo Vallecano	1–0	Celta Vigo
	Peragón 87'

== Statistics ==
=== Players statistics ===
No.	Pos	Nat	Player	Total		La Liga		Copa del Rey		UEFA Cup	
No.	Pos	Nat	Player	Apps	Goals	Apps	Goals	Apps	Goals	Apps	Goals
1	GK	(Argentina) ARG	Cavallero								
2	DF	(Spain) ESP	Velasco								
3	DF	(Brazil) BRA	Sylvinho								
4	DF	(Argentina) ARG	Caceres								
5	MF	(Brazil) BRA	Giovanella								
6	DF	(Argentina) ARG	Berizzo								
7	MF	(Brazil) BRA	Vágner								
8	MF	(Russia) RUS	Karpin								
9	FW	(France) FRA	Maurice								
10	MF	(Russia) RUS	Mostovoi								
11	MF	(Argentina) ARG	López								
13	GK	(Spain) ESP	Pinto								
14	DF	(Spain) ESP	Juanfran								
15	MF	(Brazil) BRA	Doriva								
17	DF	(Argentina) ARG	Mendez								
18	DF	(Spain) ESP	Coira								
19	MF	(Brazil) BRA	Edu								
20	MF	(Spain) ESP	Jesuli								
21	DF	(Spain) ESP	Sergio								
22	MF	(France) FRA	Luccin								
23	DF	(Equatorial Guinea) EQG	Yago								
24	FW	(Brazil) BRA	Catanha								
26	GK	(Spain) ESP	Roberto								
27	MF	(Spain) ESP	Aspas								
