= 2001 Copa del Rey final =

- Event: 2000–01 Copa del Rey
Celta Vigo	Zaragoza
1	3
- Date: 30 June 2001
- Venue: Estadio de La Cartuja, Sevilla
- Referee: José María García-Aranda
- Attendance: 38,000
- Weather: Clear; 30 °C (86 °F)

The 2001 Copa del Rey final took place on 30 June 2001 at the Estadio de La Cartuja, Sevilla. The match was contested by Celta de Vigo and Real Zaragoza, and it was refereed by José María García-Aranda. Real Zaragoza lifted the trophy for the fifth time in their history with a 3-1 victory over Celta de Vigo.

== Match details ==
30 June 2001
21:00 UTC+2

Celta de Vigo	1–3	Real Zaragoza
Mostovoi 6'	Copa del Rey 2001	Aguado 24'; Jamelli 38' (pen.); Yordi 90+4'

Estadio de La Cartuja, Sevilla
Attendance: 38,000
Referee: José María García-Aranda

Celta Vigo	Real Zaragoza

GK	1	(Argentina) Pablo Cavallero
DF	2	(Spain) Juan Velasco		(substituted off) 67'
DF	4	(Argentina) Fernando Cáceres
DF	25	(Argentina) Eduardo Berizzo	(yellow card) 35'
DF	14	(Spain) Juanfran	(yellow card) 50'
MF	12	(Peru) Juan José Jayo
MF	5	(Brazil) Everton Giovanella
MF	8	(Russia) Valery Karpin
MF	10	(Russia) Aleksandr Mostovoi (c)
MF	11	(Argentina) Gustavo López		(substituted off) 80'
FW	24	(Spain) Catanha
Substitutes:
GK	13	(Spain) José Manuel Pinto
DF	16	(Spain) Francisco Noguerol
MF	15	(Brazil) Doriva
MF	22	(Brazil) Edu		(substituted on) 67'
FW	17	(South Africa) Benni McCarthy		(substituted on) 80'
Manager:
(Spain) Víctor Fernández

GK	1	(Spain) César Láinez	(yellow card) 90'
DF	12	(Peru) Miguel Rebosio		(substituted off) 77'
DF	6	(Spain) Xavier Aguado (c)
DF	23	(Spain) Paco Jémez
DF	16	(Spain) Pablo	(yellow card) 90' 92'
MF	25	(Belarus) Sergei Gurenko
MF	14	(Spain) José Ignacio	(yellow card) 78'
MF	20	(Paraguay) Roberto Acuña
MF	11	(Spain) Martín Vellisca		(substituted off) 88'
FW	3	(Brazil) Paulo Jamelli	(yellow card) 47'	(substituted off) 67'
FW	7	(Spain) Juanele
Substitutes
GK	1	(Spain) Juanmi
DF	4	(Spain) Luis Cuartero		(substituted on) 77'
MF	8	(Spain) Santiago Aragón
MF	10	(Spain) Ander Garitano		(substituted on) 88'
FW	9	(Spain) Yordi		(substituted on) 67'
Manager:
(Spain) Luis Costa
