= National Association of Football Managers =

Spanish organisation

ANEF
- National Association of Football Managers
- Asociación Nacional de Entrenadores de Fútbol
- Founded: 5 February 2001
- Headquarters: Madrid, Spain
- Location: Spain
- Key people: Xavier Juliá (President)
- Website: www.anef.es

The National Association of Football Managers (Spanish: Asociación Nacional de Entrenadores de Fútbol, ANEF) is the association for football managers in Spain.

== Organisation ==
=== Board of directors ===
- President - Xavier Juliá
- First Vice President - Luis Aragonés
- Second Vice President - Víctor Fernández
- Third Vice President - Joaquín Caparrós
