= Aleksandr Mostovoi =

Russian footballer (born 1968)

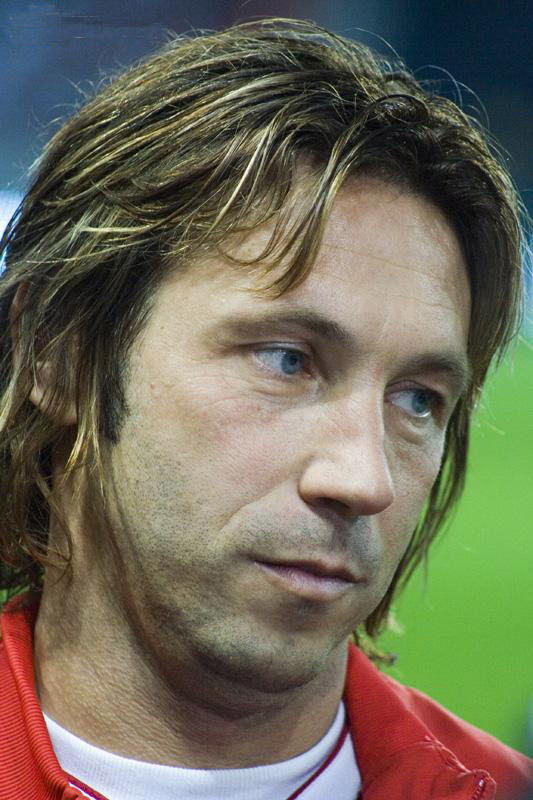
- Mostovoi in 2008

Personal information
- Full name: Aleksandr Vladimirovich Mostovoi
- Date of birth: 22 August 1968 (age 58)
- Place of birth: Lomonosov, Soviet Union
- Height: 1.77 m (5 ft 10 in)
- Position: Attacking midfielder

Youth career
- Krasnaya Presnya

Senior career*
Years	Team	Apps	(Gls)
1985–1986	Krasnaya Presnya	19	(7)
1986–1991	Spartak Moscow	106	(34)
1992–1994	Benfica	9	(0)
1993–1994	→ Caen (loan)	15	(3)
1994–1996	Strasbourg	61	(15)
1996–2004	Celta	235	(56)
2005	Alavés	1	(1)
Total		446	(116)

International career
1990–1991	USSR	13	(3)
1992	CIS	2	(0)
1992–2004	Russia	50	(10)
Medal record
Men's football
Representing Soviet Union
UEFA European Under-21 Championship
Winner	1990
- * Club domestic league appearances and goals

Aleksandr Vladimirovich Mostovoi (Russian: Алекса́ндр Влади́мирович Мостово́й [ɐlʲɪkˈsandr vlɐˈdʲimʲɪrəvʲɪtɕ məstɐˈvoj]; born 22 August 1968) is a Russian former professional footballer who played as an attacking midfielder.

Known as O Zar de Balaídos ("The Tsar of Balaídos") from his lengthy spell at Celta de Vigo, he was often referred to as a 'genius playmaker' during his time there, in addition to a volatile temperament. He also played professionally in his own country, Portugal and France.

Mostovoi earned 50 caps for Russia in a 12-year international career, being chosen for two World Cups and as many European Championships. He previously represented the Soviet Union and the CIS.

== Club career ==
=== Spartak and first abroad spell ===
Born in Lomonosov, Russia, Soviet Union, Mostovoi signed for national giants FC Spartak Moscow from second division club FC Presnya Moscow. In January 1992, he joined compatriots Vasili Kulkov and Sergei Yuran at S.L. Benfica; months before arriving, he was controversially awarded Portuguese citizenship through marriage, but never imposed himself in the first team.

Midway through 1993–94 Mostovoi joined Ligue 1 side Stade Malherbe Caen, then left after the sole season to fellow French side RC Strasbourg, rejoining coach Daniel Jeandupeux.

=== Celta ===
Mostovoi's big break came when he signed for Celta de Vigo in 1996, for 325 million pesetas (about €1.95 million). He made his debut for the Galicians in a 2–0 home defeat against Real Betis, and his creative play and key goals made him a cult figure at Balaídos as the club rose to near the top of La Liga standings year after year.

Affectionately nicknamed 'The Tsar of Balaídos' by the fans, Mostovoi formed an impressive midfield society with, amongst others, compatriot Valery Karpin, and helped Celta win the 2000 UEFA Intertoto Cup; the final was a 4–3 aggregate win over his hometown club FC Zenit Saint Petersburg. However, he could not help the freefall that hit the team in the 2003–04 season, relegating it to the second division after the player appeared in a career-worst (in his Celta career) 24 matches. His top-flight tally of 235 games for Celta was a club record until Hugo Mallo broke it in 2021.

=== Alavés ===
Having not played for over eight months, and at the age of 36, Mostovoi signed a contract with Dmitry Pietrman's Deportivo Alavés in early March 2005, initially until the end of the second level campaign. His first, and only, game came in a league game against Cádiz CF in which he came on as a substitute, in the 78th minute – he scored the Basques' only goal (and nearly added a second) in an eventual 1–3 defeat.

Having been with the club for only 30 days, Mostovoi told the club directors of his intention to retire claiming he was suffering from back problems.

== International career ==
Mostovoi played for the Soviet national team, the CIS and Russia internationally. In another temper tantrum, he was sent home by team manager Georgi Yartsev during the latter's trip to UEFA Euro 2004, after questioning his methods. He played in the Euro 1996 and the 1994 FIFA World Cup and was also picked for the 2002 World Cup, but did not play in the latter tournament due to injury.

Mostovoi's exclusion from Euro 2004's national squad happened after the 0–1 group stage loss to Spain. Supposedly, the player talked with the media after the match and gave an interview saying that Yartsev was not a good coach, this was later proven false, after Mostovoi gave another interview and explained he merely said that Yartsev overworked the players during practice, so they didn't have the necessary energy to play well in matches. Group morale dropped after the incident, and Russia lost the second game to hosts Portugal.

In 2009, Mostovoi was part of the Russia squad that won the Legends Cup.

== Style of play ==
An attacking midfielder, Mostovoi was known for his technical ability as well as his character. An advanced playmaker, Mostovoi was capable of playing in several midfield and offensive positions. His preferred position was in a free role as a classic number 10, but he was also used in central midfield and as a winger.

== Retirement ==
After retiring as a player, in 2005 Mostovoi was persuaded by the then Russian Tennis Federation president Shamil Tarpishchev to play for the Russia national beach soccer team.

Mostovoi has repeatedly stated his desire and willingness to lead a football club as a manager. However, Mostovoi does not have the necessary UEFA coaching licences, which he does not want to obtain. Since 2011, he has expressed various versions of this decision: from doubts about obtaining new knowledge in coaching courses to corrupt schemes to obtain this licence by other specialists.

== Personal life ==
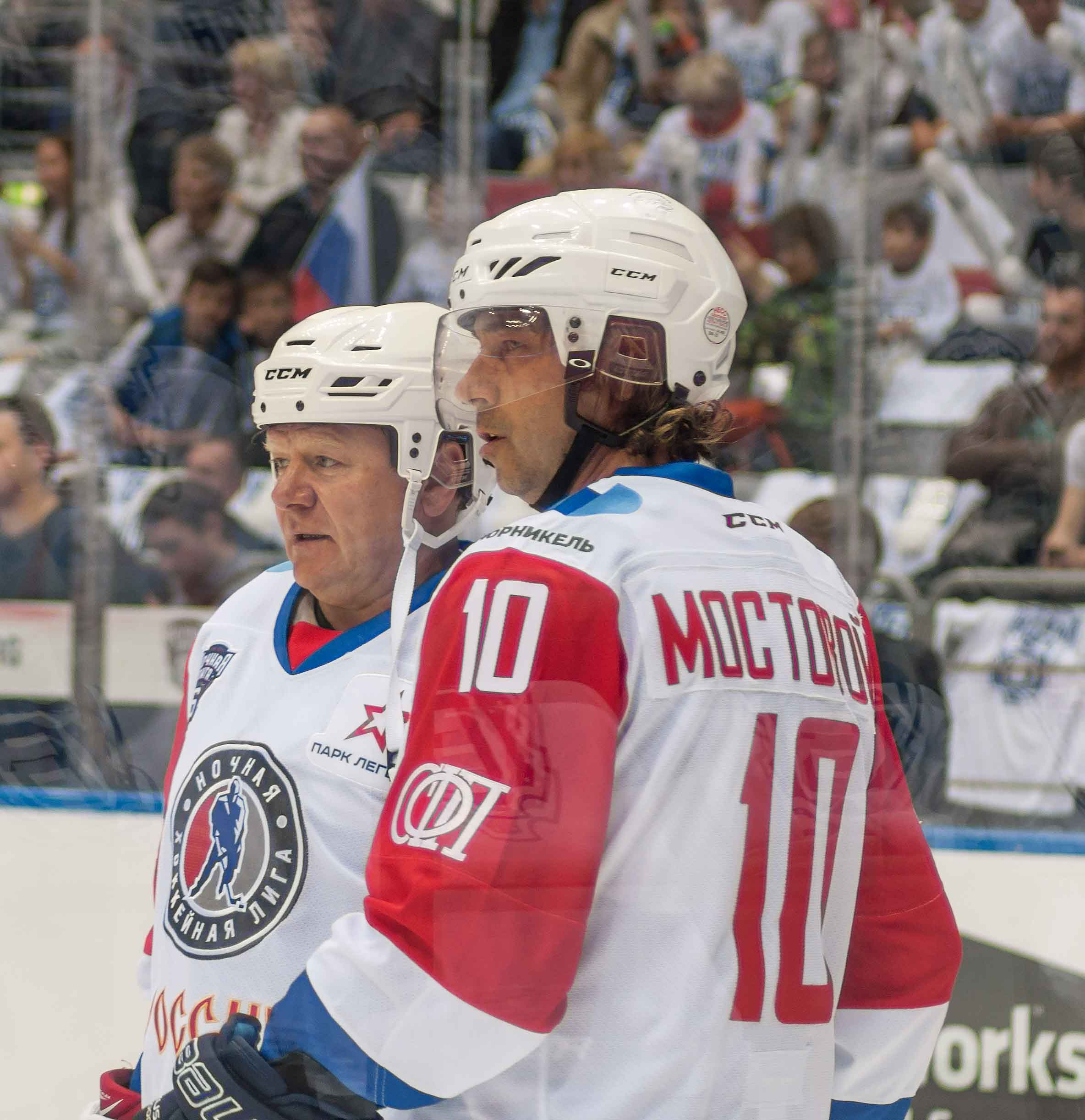
Mostovoi (right) and musician Igor Butman at a celebrity ice hockey match in 2017

Mostovoi graduated from college as an electrician, and later joined a sports academy in Moscow, which provided coaching to young players with a university education.

After losing the 2001 Copa del Rey Final, a group of Celta supporters raised four million pesetas to commission a statue of Mostovoi. The player approved and Maxín Picallo was chosen as the sculptor, but the project was never finished; he believed that his dip in form in 2003 affected enthusiasm in the endeavour.

He was in a relationship with Stéphanie, whom he met in Strasbourg. The couple have two children, Alexander (born 1996) and Emma. His son of the same name, known by the hypocorism Sacha, trialled with S.L. Benfica B in 2016.

== Career statistics ==
=== Club ===
Appearances and goals by club, season and competition
Club	Season	League			National cup (Note: Includes Soviet Cup, Taça de Portugal, Supertaça Cândido de Oliveira, Coupe de France, Copa del Rey)		Continental		Total	
Club	Season	Division	Apps	Goals	Apps	Goals	Apps	Goals	Apps	Goals
Krasnaya Presnya	1986	Soviet Second League	19	7	1	0	–		20	7
Spartak Moscow	1987	Soviet Top League	18	6	4	0	4 (Note: Appearances in European Cup)	3	26	9
Spartak Moscow	1988	Soviet Top League	27	3	4	2	4 (Note: Appearances in UEFA Cup)	0	35	5
Spartak Moscow	1989	Soviet Top League	11	3	2	0	2	0	15	3
Spartak Moscow	1990	Soviet Top League	23	9	3	5	4	0	30	14
Spartak Moscow	1991	Soviet Top League	27	13	2	1	7 (Note: Appearances in European Cup Winners' Cup)	3	36	17
Spartak Moscow	Total		106	34	15	8	21	6	142	48
Benfica	1992–93	Primeira Liga	9	0	3	2	3	0	15	2
Benfica	1993–94	Primeira Liga	0	0	1	0	0	0	0	0
Benfica	Total		9	0	4	2	3	0	16	2
Caen (loan)	1993–94	Division 1	15	3	0	0	–		15	3
Strasbourg	1994–95	Division 1	29	6	4	1	–		33	7
Strasbourg	1995–96	Division 1	32	9	3	1	6	2	41	12
Strasbourg	Total		61	15	7	2	6	2	74	19
Celta	1996–97	La Liga	31	5	6	1	–		37	6
Celta	1997–98	La Liga	34	8	3	1	–		37	9
Celta	1998–99	La Liga	33	6	1	0	7	3	41	9
Celta	1999–2000	La Liga	26	6	1	0	7	2	34	8
Celta	2000–01	La Liga	30	9	6	2	9	2	45	13
Celta	2001–02	La Liga	30	10	0	0	11	3	31	13
Celta	2002–03	La Liga	27	5	0	0	4	1	31	6
Celta	2003–04	La Liga	24	6	2	0	8 (Note: Appearances in UEFA Champions League)	2	34	8
Celta	Total		235	55	19	4	36	13	290	72
Alavés	2004–05	Segunda División	1	1	0	0	–		1	1
Career total			446	116	42	14	64	20	552	150

=== International ===
Alexander Mostovoi: International goals
No.	Date	Venue	Opponent	Score	Result	Competition
1	30 November 1990	Estadio Mateo Flores, Guatemala City, Guatemala	Guatemala	0–1	0–3	Friendly
2	30 May 1991	Luzhniki Stadium, Moscow, Soviet Union	Cyprus	1–0	4–0	Euro 1992 qualifying
3	28 August 1991	Ullevaal Stadion, Oslo, Norway	Norway	0–1	0–1	Euro 1992 qualifying
1	6 October 1993	King Fahd International Stadium, Riyadh, Saudi Arabia	Saudi Arabia	0–1	4–2	Friendly
2	6 October 1993	King Fahd International Stadium, Riyadh, Saudi Arabia	Saudi Arabia	3–2	4–2	Friendly
3	6 September 1995	Svangaskarð, Toftir, Faroe Islands	Faroe Islands	0–1	2–5	Euro 1996 qualifying
4	9 February 1996	Lansdowne Road, Dublin, Ireland	Republic of Ireland	0–1	0–2	Friendly
5	25 May 1996	Khalifa International Stadium, Doha, Qatar	Qatar		2–5	Friendly
6	19 June 1996	Anfield, Liverpool, England	Czech Republic	2–1	3–3	UEFA Euro 1996
7	10 October 1998	Luzhniki Stadium, Moscow, Russia	France	2–2	2–3	Euro 2000 qualifying
8	19 May 1999	Arsenal Stadium (Tula), Tula, Russia	Belarus		1–1	Friendly
9	28 March 2001	Luzhniki Stadium, Moscow, Russia	Faroe Islands	1–0	1–0	2002 World Cup qualification
10	10 September 2003	Lokomotiv Stadium (Moscow), Moscow, Russia	Switzerland	4–1	4–1	Euro 2004 qualifying

== Honours ==
Spartak Moscow

- Soviet Top League: 1987, 1989

Benfica

- Taça de Portugal: 1992–93

Strasbourg

- UEFA Intertoto Cup: 1995

Celta

- UEFA Intertoto Cup: 2000
- Copa del Rey runner-up: 2000-01

Soviet Union

- UEFA European Under-21 Championship: 1990

Russia

- Legends Cup: 2009

Individual

- ADN Eastern European Footballer of the Season: 2001
