= Sylvinho =

Brazilian footballer and manager (born 1974)

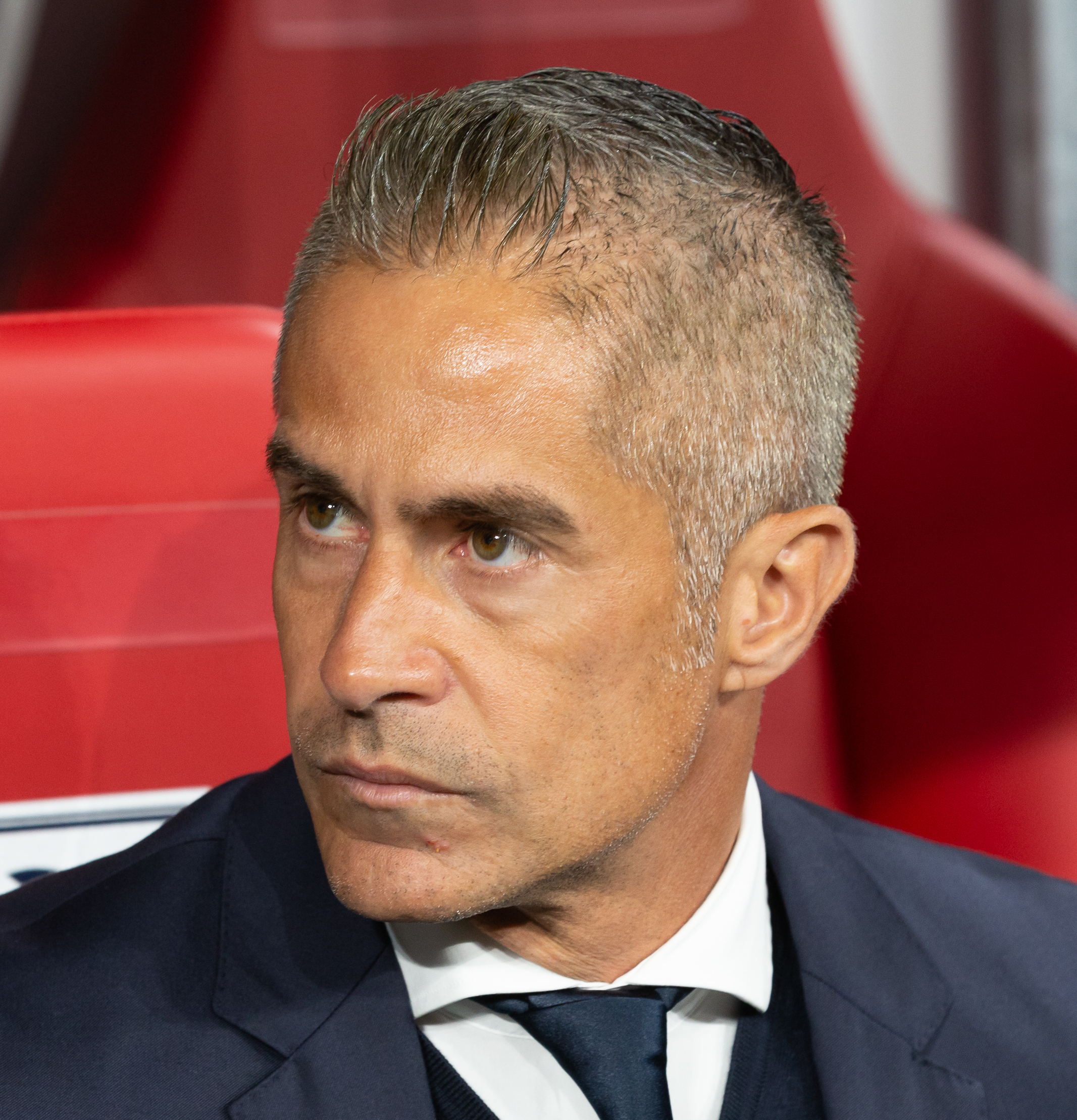
- Sylvinho in 2019

Personal information
- Full name: Sylvio Mendes Campos Júnior
- Date of birth: 12 April 1974 (age 52)
- Place of birth: São Paulo, Brazil
- Height: 1.73 m (5 ft 8 in)
- Position: Left-back

Youth career
- 1990–1994: Corinthians

Senior career*
Years	Team	Apps	(Gls)
1994–1999	Corinthians	177	(1)
1999–2001	Arsenal	55	(3)
2001–2004	Celta	84	(1)
2004–2009	Barcelona	89	(2)
2009–2010	Manchester City	10	(0)
Total		415	(7)

International career
2000–2001	Brazil	6	(0)

Managerial career
- 2019: Lyon
- 2021–2022: Corinthians
- 2023–2026: Albania
Medal record
Representing Brazil
Men's football
CONCACAF Gold Cup
Third place	1998 United States
- * Club domestic league appearances and goals

Sylvio Mendes Campos Júnior (born 12 April 1974), commonly known as Sylvinho (sometimes alternatively spelled Silvinho), is a Brazilian football manager and former player.

Formerly a left-back, he began his career at Corinthians. He was signed by Arsenal in 1999 and was a popular player in his two seasons at the club. He left for Celta Vigo of La Liga, before joining Barcelona in 2004, with whom he won the UEFA Champions League in 2006 and 2009 among other honours. He returned to England to spend his final season as a player with Manchester City in 2009–10.

Upon moving into management, he had brief stints at French club Lyon and Brazilian side Corinthians, before being named coach of the Albania national team in 2023, subsequently qualifying them for UEFA Euro 2024.

== Club career ==
=== Corinthians ===
Born in São Paulo, Brazil, Sylvinho started his career at Corinthians in 1994. With Timão, Sylvinho won the Copa do Brasil in 1995. He was also victorious with Corinthians in 1998 season of Brazil's topflight league, the Campeonato Brasileiro Série A. Sylvinho as well won the Campeonato Paulista in 1995, 1997 and 1999 with Corinthians altogether.

=== Arsenal ===
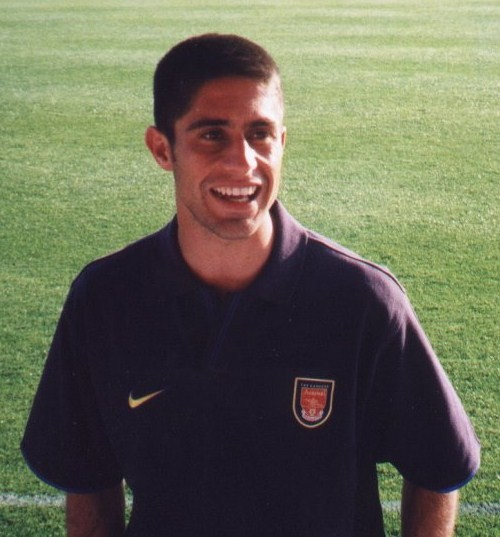
Sylvinho in 1999

In 1999, he became the first ever Brazilian player to sign for English club Arsenal, whom he signed for ahead of North London rivals Tottenham Hotspur who had made numerous offers for him. Before long he was first choice at left back, displacing long-time fan-favourite Nigel Winterburn. He had a setback early on in his first season when he missed a penalty in a shootout as Arsenal crashed out of the League Cup to Middlesbrough, and that season finished with a 4–1 loss on penalties against Turkish club Galatasaray in the 2000 UEFA Cup final, although this time he did not take a penalty. During his second season at the club he was displaced by Ashley Cole. He scored goals against Sheffield Wednesday, Charlton Athletic and Chelsea. He also scored twice in the Champions League for Arsenal against Sparta Prague and Spartak Moscow. In the 2000–01 season, Sylvinho was included in the PFA Team of the Year.

During his time at Arsenal, Sylvinho was registered under a Portuguese passport, allowing him to be classed as a European Union citizen and exempt from work permit requirements. Britain's Immigration Services investigated the validity of this document before Sylvinho moved to Celta Vigo, where he was classified as a Brazilian citizen. Sylvinho said after his transfer to Celta that he was unaware of having been registered at Arsenal as a Portuguese citizen, and said that it was solely the decision of the club's executives.

=== Celta Vigo ===
In 2001, he moved to Celta Vigo, and played there for three years, scoring once in the league against Barcelona on 26 January 2003, his future club. He became a popular figure with the club's fans, helping the team to qualify for the Champions League for the first time in their history during the 2003–04 season.

Sylvinho obtained a Spanish passport in 2004, granted to him after completing three years' residency in Spain. It allowed him to bypass the non-EU player restrictions in La Liga.

=== Barcelona ===
In 2004, after a transfer fee of €2 million, he was signed by Barcelona, where he won three domestic leagues (2005, 2006 and 2009) and the Champions League in 2006 and 2009. After a series of good performances in 2008, he was given an extension until 2009.

He played the entire match in Barcelona's 2–0 victory over defending champions Manchester United in the 2009 UEFA Champions League final, ahead of the suspended Eric Abidal, previously having been an unused substitute in the final three years earlier. This was his final game for the Catalan club.

=== Manchester City ===
Manchester City visited the Camp Nou on 19 August 2009 and, having beaten Barcelona 1–0 in a friendly, held discussions about Sylvinho joining them at the end of the month, thereby joining up with countryman Robinho. It was announced on 24 August 2009 that he had signed for City on a free transfer, with a one-year contract. He made his debut against Scunthorpe United in the League Cup. His first league appearance came on 12 December 2009 against Bolton Wanderers, following the absence of an injured Wayne Bridge. He scored his first goal for Manchester City in a 4–2 win against Scunthorpe in the FA Cup on 24 January 2010, with a spectacular long range strike.

On 8 June 2010, it was announced that Sylvinho's contract had expired and that he would be leaving the club, as were Benjani Mwaruwari, Jack Redshaw, Karl Moore and Martin Petrov.

== International career ==
After receiving his first international call-up in 1997 under Mario Zagallo for a match against Russia, Sylvinho formed part of Brazil's squad for the 1998 CONCACAF Gold Cup where the team earned the bronze medal. He then made his international debut for Brazil in a friendly 3–0 win over Wales in Cardiff on 23 May 2000. Four days later, he played in a friendly match against England in London, which ended in a 1–1 draw. He went on to achieve a total of 6 international caps, as a backup to Roberto Carlos at the left-back position. His last appearance with Brazil was on 28 March 2001 in a World Cup qualifier against Ecuador.

== Managerial career ==
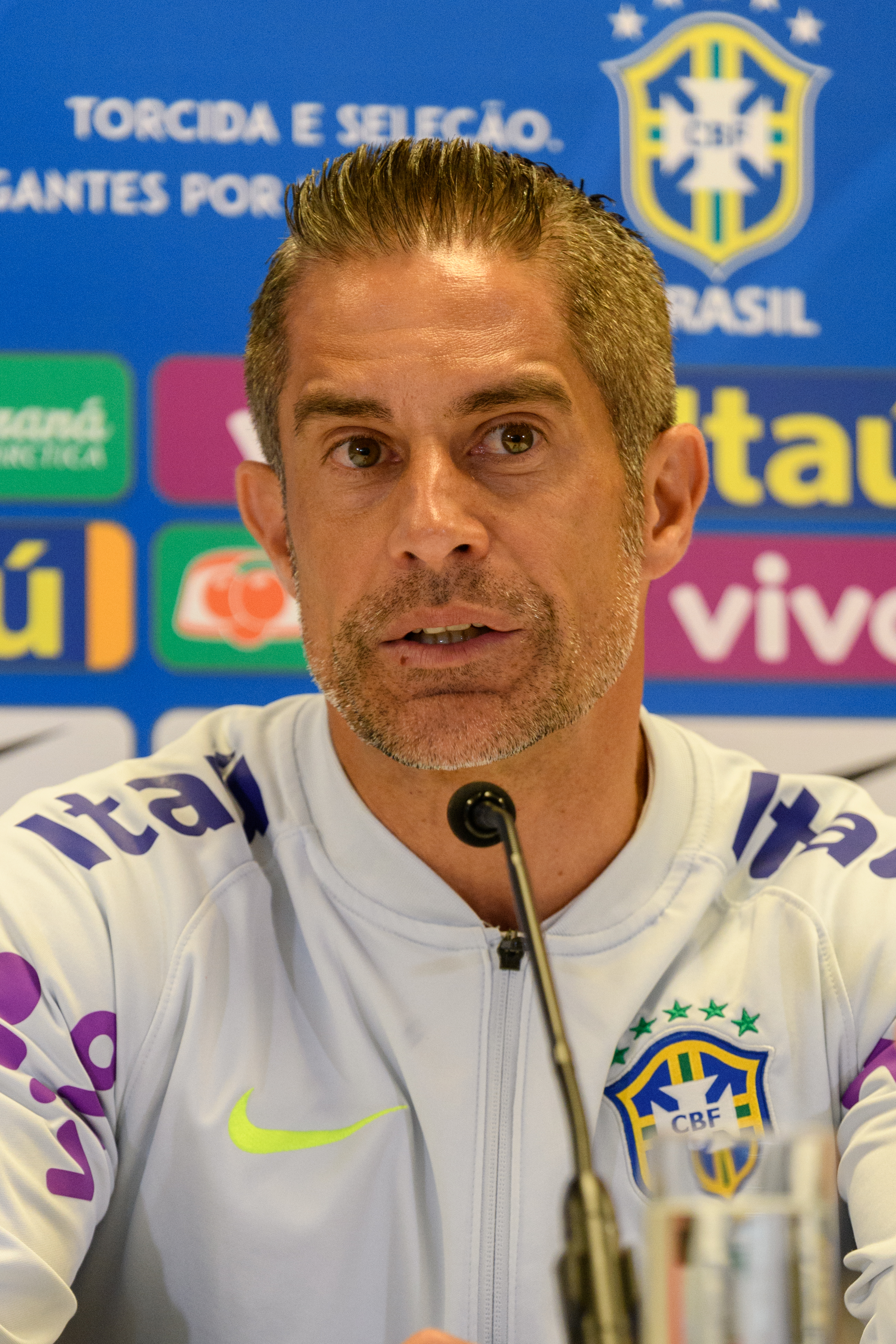
Sylvinho in 2018.

=== Youth and assistant ===
On 7 July 2011, Sylvinho announced he would be retiring from football. He was hired as Cruzeiro's assistant manager on 27 September 2011. After a stint on Sport Recife and Náutico, he returned to Corinthians on 5 July 2013, as assistant manager to Tite.

On 13 December 2014, he was appointed as Roberto Mancini's assistant coach by Italian club Inter Milan. On 20 July 2016, he joined the Brazil national team as an assistant once again to Tite. On 9 April 2019, he was appointed as manager of the Brazil national under-23 team ahead of the 2020 Summer Olympics, but did not take charge.

=== Lyon ===
On 19 May 2019, Sylvinho was announced as the replacement for Bruno Génésio at Lyon. Compatriot Juninho Pernambucano, an icon at the club, became director of football. On his senior managerial debut on 9 August, he won 3–0 at Monaco, followed a week later with a 6–0 home win over Angers. He won no more games in the next seven league fixtures, and was sacked on 7 October 2019 after a 1–0 loss at rivals Saint-Étienne in the Rhone derby.

=== Corinthians ===
On 23 May 2021, Sylvinho's return to Corinthians as their new manager was announced on a contract until the end of the following year. He lost on his debut a week later, 1–0 at home to Atlético Goianiense with a missed penalty. On 3 February 2022, only three matches into the new season, he was sacked after a 1–2 home defeat to rivals Santos.

=== Albania ===
On 2 January 2023, the Albanian Football Association announced that it had reached an agreement with Sylvinho to be the new head coach of the Albania national team and that Pablo Zabaleta and Doriva would join him as assistant coaches. Seven days later, he was officially appointed as the head coach and signed an 18-month contract, where the goal of the contract was to qualify for UEFA Euro 2024. Sylvinho moved into a hotel in the Albanian capital Tirana, leaving his family in Porto, Portugal; he communicated with his team mostly in Italian.

Sylvinho and his assistant made an initial 70-man list for their team. Wishing to play a 4–3–3 formation, he needed a left-footed right-winger, and found in the database Jasir Asani, a 27-year-old uncapped Macedonia-born player for Gwangju FC in South Korea; Asani went on to score three goals and assist two more in European qualification. Sylvinho's team became known for attacking and for scoring long-distance goals.

Sylvinho's debut on 27 March 2023 was a 1–0 loss away to Poland in a qualifier, but he subsequently guided the team to the finals with a 1–1 draw away to Moldova on 17 November. With four wins, three draws and only the opening loss, Albania won the group ahead of the Czech Republic on head-to-head.

On 30 November 2023, Sylvinho was given the Golden Decoration of the Eagle by Prime Minister of Albania, Edi Rama. On 18 December 2023, Sylvinho obtained Albanian citizenship.

Following a 2–1 defeat to Poland on 26 March 2026, which ended the team's 2026 FIFA World Cup qualifying run, Sylvinho was expected to leave the team's management in July, when his contract extension for the World Cup was due to expire. He left his post on 19 May.

== Style of play ==
A quick, reliable, and technically gifted attacking left back, Sylvinho was known in particular for his overlapping runs, as well as his crossing ability with his left foot; he also possessed good tactical awareness, defensive attributes, and concentration, which also enabled him to play as a midfielder, as a wing-back, or occasionally as a winger.

== Career statistics ==
=== Club ===
Appearances and goals by club, season and competition
Club	Season	League			State League (Note: Includes Campeonato Paulista matches.)		National cup		League cup		Continental		Other		Total	
Club	Season	Division	Apps	Goals	Apps	Goals	Apps	Goals	Apps	Goals	Apps	Goals	Apps	Goals	Apps	Goals
Corinthians	1994	Série A	3	0	0	0	0	0	—		—		—		3	0
Corinthians	1995	Série A	13	0	26	0	10	0	—		—		—		49	0
Corinthians	1996	Série A	21	0	19	0	5	0	—		9 (Note: Appearance(s) in Copa Libertadores)	0	—		54	0
Corinthians	1997	Série A	22	0	15	0	6	0	—		—		2 (Note: Appearance(s) in Torneio Rio – São Paulo)	0	45	0
Corinthians	1998	Série A	30	0	13	0	2	0	—		3 (Note: Appearance(s) in Copa Mercosur)	0	3	0	51	0
Corinthians	1999	Série A	0	0	15	1	4	0	—		9	1	5	0	33	2
Corinthians	Total		89	0	88	1	27	0	0	0	21	1	10	0	235	2
Arsenal	1999–2000	Premier League	31	1	—		3	0	2	0	9 (Note: One appearance in UEFA Champions League, eight appearances in UEFA Cup)	0	1 (Note: Appearance(s) in FA Charity Shield)	0	46	1
Arsenal	2000–01	Premier League	24	2	—		3	0	0	0	7 (Note: Appearance(s) in UEFA Champions League)	2	—		34	4
Arsenal	Total		55	3	0	0	6	0	2	0	16	2	1	0	80	5
Celta Vigo	2001–02	La Liga	23	0	—		2	0	—		2 (Note: Appearance(s) in UEFA Cup)	0	—		27	0
Celta Vigo	2002–03	La Liga	32	1	—		2	0	—		3	0	—		37	1
Celta Vigo	2003–04	La Liga	29	0	—		5	0	—		9	0	—		43	0
Celta Vigo	Total		84	1	0	0	9	0	0	0	14	0	0	0	107	1
Barcelona	2004–05	La Liga	21	0	—		0	0	—		3	0	—		24	0
Barcelona	2005–06	La Liga	26	2	—		2	0	—		1	0	2 (Note: Appearance(s) in Supercopa de España)	0	31	2
Barcelona	2006–07	La Liga	13	0	—		4	0	—		2	0	2 (Note: One appearance in UEFA Super Cup, one appearance in Supercopa de España)	0	21	0
Barcelona	2007–08	La Liga	14	0	—		4	0	—		4	0	—		22	0
Barcelona	2008–09	La Liga	15	0	—		8	0	—		7	1	—		30	1
Barcelona	Total		89	2	0	0	18	0	0	0	17	1	4	0	128	3
Manchester City	2009–10	Premier League	10	0	0	0	3	1	2	0	0	0	0	0	15	1
Career total			327	6	88	1	63	1	4	0	68	4	15	0	565	12

=== International ===
Appearances and goals by national team and year
National team	Year	Apps	Goals
Brazil	2000	3	0
Brazil	2001	3	0
Total		6	0

== Managerial statistics ==
As of match played 31 March 2026

Team	From	To	Record							
Team	From	To	G	W	D	L	GF	GA	GD	Win %
Lyon	24 May 2019	7 October 2019	11	3	4	4	17	10	+7	27.27
Corinthians	23 May 2021	3 February 2022	43	16	14	13	42	41	+1	37.21
Albania	1 January 2023	19 May 2026	33	15	6	12	40	30	+10	45.45
Career totals			87	34	24	29	99	81	+18	39.08

== Honours ==
Corinthians

- Campeonato Paulista: 1995, 1997, 1999
- Campeonato Brasileiro Série A: 1998
- Copa do Brasil: 1995

Arsenal

- FA Charity Shield: 1999

Barcelona

- La Liga: 2004–05, 2005–06, 2008–09
- Copa del Rey: 2008–09
- Supercopa de España: 2005, 2006
- UEFA Champions League: 2005–06, 2008–09

Brazil

- CONCACAF Gold Cup third place: 1998

Individual

- PFA Team of the Year: 2000–01 Premier League
