= Ramón Carnero =

Spanish footballer and manager

Personal information
- Full name: Ramón Carnero González
- Date of birth: 8 November 1953 (age 72)
- Place of birth: Vigo, Spain
- Height: 1.77 m (5 ft 10 in)
- Position: Defender

Senior career*
Years	Team	Apps	(Gls)
- Gran Peña Celtista
1977–1978	Deportivo Alavés	1	(0)
1979	Logroñés	9	(0)
1979–1984	Arosa	31	(1)
Total		41	(1)

Managerial career
- 1992–1993: Celta Turista
- 2004: Celta Vigo (caretaker)
- 2004: Celta Vigo
- * Club domestic league appearances and goals

Ramón Carnero González (born 8 November 1953) is a Spanish retired footballer who played as a defender, and later worked as a manager.

== Playing career ==
Carnero was born in Vigo in the province of Pontevedra, within the autonomous community of Galicia, and played for local minnows Gran Peña Celtista. He spent 18 months at Deportivo Alavés from the summer of 1977, making only one appearance in the Segunda División. He played the last nine minutes of an away fixture against Real Zaragoza on 23 April 1978, replacing Luis Sánchez Martín as Alavés lost 1–0. After half a season with Logroñés in Segunda División B, he joined Arosa in the Tercera División in 1979. He spent five years there, returning to the third tier for his last season after promotion in 1983.

== Coaching career ==
Carnero was the manager of Celta Vigo's B team, Celta Turista, for the 1992–93 Segunda División season. They avoided relegation in 15th place, but Carnero was replaced by Jacinto Barreiro the following season.

When Celta first team coach Miguel Ángel Lotina was sacked in January 2004, Carnero stepped in as caretaker manager. His sole match in charge was a 1–0 win over his former club Deportivo Alavés in the quarter-finals of the Copa del Rey, although Celta were still eliminated 4–3 on aggregate. Radomir Antić was appointed as the new manager the following day.

Antić lasted only two months before quitting in March, and Carnero once again stepped into the breach, taking charge until the end of the season. He could not prevent Celta being relegated, and was replaced by Fernando Vázquez the following season.

== Career statistics ==
=== Player ===
As of 11 February 2021

Club	Season	League			Cup		Total	
Club	Season	Division	Apps	Goals	Apps	Goals	Apps	Goals
Gran Peña Celtista	1974–75	Tercera División	?	?	1	0	1	0
Deportivo Alavés	1977–78	Segunda División	1	0	2	0	3	0
Deportivo Alavés	1978–79	Segunda División	0	0	0	0	0	0
Deportivo Alavés	Total		1	0	2	0	3	0
Logroñés	1978–79	Segunda División B	9	0	0	0	9	0
Arosa	1979–80	Tercera División	?	?	2	0	2	0
Arosa	1980–81	Tercera División	?	?	4	0	4	0
Arosa	1981–82	Tercera División	?	?	4	0	4	0
Arosa	1982–83	Tercera División	?	?	2	0	2	0
Arosa	1983–84	Segunda División B	31	1	6	0	37	1
Arosa	Total		31	1	18	0	49	1
Career total			41	1	21	0	62	1

=== As a manager ===
As of 11 February 2021

Managerial record by team and tenure
Team	Nat	From	To	Record								Ref
Team	Nat	From	To	G	W	D	L	GF	GA	GD	Win %	Ref
Celta Turista	(Spain)	6 September 1992	23 May 1993	38	10	13	15	37	47	−10	26.32	
Celta Vigo (caretaker)	(Spain)	28 January 2004	28 January 2004	1	1	0	0	1	0	+1	100.00	
Celta Vigo	(Spain)	4 April 2004	23 May 2004	8	3	2	3	7	8	−1	37.50	
