= Gustavo López (footballer, born 1973) =

Argentine footballer (born 1973)

Personal information
- Full name: Gustavo Adrián López Pablo
- Date of birth: 13 April 1973 (age 53)
- Place of birth: Valentín Alsina, Argentina
- Height: 1.74 m (5 ft 9 in)
- Position: Winger

Team information
- Current team: Atlético Madrid (assistant manager)

Senior career*
Years	Team	Apps	(Gls)
1991–1995	Independiente	74	(9)
1996–1999	Zaragoza	105	(12)
1999–2007	Celta	238	(22)
2007–2008	Cádiz	33	(2)
Total		450	(45)

International career
1994–2003	Argentina	32	(4)

Managerial career
- 2022–: Atlético Madrid (assistant)
Medal record
Representing Argentina
Men's Football
Silver medal – second place	1996 Atlanta	Team competition
- * Club domestic league appearances and goals

Gustavo Adrián López Pablo (born 13 April 1973) is an Argentine football coach and former player who played as a left winger. He is an assistant coach for Atlético Madrid.

He spent the vast majority of his professional career in Spain, amassing La Liga totals of 310 matches and 33 goals during 11 seasons (13 in the country overall), playing for Zaragoza and Celta. He started his career with Independiente.

An Argentine international for nine years, López represented the nation at the 2002 World Cup and two Copa América tournaments.

== Club career ==
=== Early years and Zaragoza ===
Born in Valentín Alsina, Buenos Aires, López began his career with local Independiente in 1991. He won four major titles during his spell there, all arriving in his last years.

In January 1996, López moved to Spain with Real Zaragoza for a club record 420 million pesetas, making his La Liga debut on the 7th in a 1–1 home draw against Rayo Vallecano. He scored five goals in 32 matches in his third full season, helping to the ninth position in the table; during most of his stint in Aragon, he partnered countryman Kily González.

=== Celta ===
López rejoined former Zaragoza manager Víctor Fernández at Celta in summer 1999, and quickly became an essential first-team unit. He netted twice in five appearances in the 2000–01 edition of the Copa del Rey, helping the side to the final against his former club (1–3 loss in Seville), then contributed with 33 games (29 starts, 2.232 minutes of action) in the 2002–03 campaign as the Galicians finished fourth and qualified for the UEFA Champions League for the first time in their history.

At the end of 2006–07, after having suffered his second relegation with Celta and having already renewed his contract twice by reducing his wages, 34-year-old López decided to leave the club, amassing official totals of 292 matches and 29 goals. He retired at the end of the following season, also dropping down a level with Cádiz in Segunda División, then worked as commentator for Canal+ on their coverage of La Liga and for PRISA regarding the Argentine top level, as well as running training camps for children.

== International career ==
López won 32 caps for Argentina and scored four goals, making his debut against Romania in December 1994. He represented the country at the 1997 and 1999 Copa América tournaments, being an unused squad member at the ill-fated 2002 FIFA World Cup in Japan and South Korea.

Additionally, López helped the under-23 side win the silver medal at the 1996 Summer Olympics in Atlanta, scoring in the 3–1 group stage win over the United States.

== Managerial career ==
On June 15, 2022, López joined Diego Simeone's coaching staff in Atlético Madrid.

== Honours ==
Independiente

- Argentine Primera División: Clausura 1994
- Supercopa Sudamericana: 1994, 1995
- Recopa Sudamericana: 1995

Celta

- UEFA Intertoto Cup: 2000
- Copa del Rey: Runner-up 2000–01

Argentina

- Summer Olympic Games: Silver medal 1996
