= Víctor Fernández =

Spanish football manager

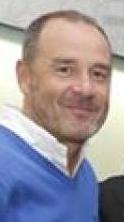
- Fernández in 2014

Personal information
- Full name: Víctor Fernández Braulio
- Date of birth: 28 November 1960 (age 65)
- Place of birth: Zaragoza, Spain
- Height: 1.73 m (5 ft 8 in)
- Position: Midfielder

Youth career
- Stadium Casablanca

Senior career*
Years	Team	Apps	(Gls)
- Sariñena

Managerial career
- 1982–1988: Stadium Casablanca (youth)
- 1988–1990: Zaragoza (assistant)
- 1990–1991: Zaragoza B
- 1991–1996: Zaragoza
- 1997: Tenerife
- 1998–2002: Celta
- 2002–2004: Betis
- 2004–2005: Porto
- 2006–2008: Zaragoza
- 2010: Betis
- 2013: Gent
- 2014–2015: Deportivo La Coruña
- 2018–2020: Zaragoza
- 2024: Zaragoza
- * Club domestic league appearances and goals

Víctor Fernández Braulio (born 28 November 1960) is a Spanish football manager.

He had four spells with his hometown team Zaragoza, winning the Copa del Rey in 1994 and the Cup Winners' Cup a year later. He also led Tenerife, Celta, Real Betis and Deportivo de La Coruña in La Liga, and won the Intercontinental Cup in a brief spell at Porto in 2004.

== Career ==
=== Zaragoza ===
Fernández was born in Zaragoza, Aragon. Late into the 1990–91 season, aged only 30, he was promoted to hometown Real Zaragoza's first team, eventually leading it to the 17th league position and avoiding La Liga relegation in the playoffs against Real Murcia CF; at the time of his beginnings, he was the second youngest manager to ever coach in the league after Xabier Azkargorta.

In the following years, Fernández helped Zaragoza consolidate in the top division, notably reconverting Gus Poyet from forward to attacking midfielder and winning the Copa del Rey in 1994 and the UEFA Cup Winners' Cup the next season. He was relieved of his duties on 8 November 1996, meeting the same fate the following year with his next club, CD Tenerife.

=== Celta ===
In May 1998, Fernández was appointed to replace Javier Irureta at RC Celta de Vigo, Profiting from the recent Bosman ruling, his team fielded many European Union players such as Claude Makélélé, as well as those from further afield such as the Israeli Haim Revivo and Russian midfield duo Valeri Karpin and Aleksandr Mostovoi; the Galician team played highly attractive football and were known as EuroCelta for their performances in continental competitions.

Fernández led Celta in the UEFA Cup in each of his four seasons, reaching the quarter-finals on all but one occasion; highlights included a 3–1 win over Liverpool in November 1998, a 7–0 rout of S.L. Benfica a year later and a 4–0 victory at Juventus FC in March 2000. His team won the UEFA Intertoto Cup in the summer of 2000, with a 4–3 aggregate defeat of FC Zenit Saint Petersburg. Domestically, he surprisingly lost the 2001 Copa del Rey final 3–1 to Zaragoza, who had barely avoided relegation.

=== Betis ===
Fernández was appointed at fellow top flight team Real Betis in May 2002, after the exit of Juande Ramos. He finished eighth and ninth respectively in his two years, and his team were eliminated from the third round of the UEFA Cup by AJ Auxerre in his first campaign.

=== Porto ===
In August 2004, Fernández moved abroad and joined Portuguese club FC Porto; the UEFA Champions League holders had dismissed Luigi Delneri before a single competitive game. He won on his debut on 20 August in the Supertaça Cândido de Oliveira, with new signing Ricardo Quaresma scoring the only goal of a win against rivals Benfica; on 12 December he added the conquest of the last ever Intercontinental Cup with a penalty shootout victory over Colombia's Once Caldas.

Domestically, Fernández's team gave up their Primeira Liga lead to Benfica on 20 November 2004 when they lost 1–0 at home to neighbours Boavista FC. Home form was a struggle with three wins from the first seven fixtures, including another single-goal defeat to S.C. Beira-Mar two weeks later. He was abruptly dismissed the following January following a 1–3 defeat to S.C. Braga, again at the Estádio do Dragão.

=== Returns to Zaragoza and Betis ===
Fernández returned to his beloved Zaragoza for the 2006–07 campaign, qualifying the side for the UEFA Cup in his first year but being sacked midway through his second, as the season eventually ended in relegation.

In another return, Fernández joined Betis in late January 2010, replacing fired Antonio Tapia. During his spell the Verdiblancos were the team in the league with the most points, but they missed out on promotion from Segunda División after being beaten to promotion places through head-to-head against Hércules CF and Levante UD, despite beating the latter 4–0 on the final day.

=== Later years ===
On 9 January 2013, Fernández moved for his second experience abroad, signing a contract with Belgium's K.A.A. Gent. He was sacked on 30 September 2013, due to poor results.

Fernández was appointed as the new manager of Deportivo de La Coruña on 10 July 2014, succeeding Fernando Vázquez. He was relieved of his duties on 9 April of the following year, with the team eventually narrowly escaping relegation.

In the summer of 2015, Fernández signed for Real Madrid as youth system coordinator. He left the Santiago Bernabéu Stadium in 2017, and on 17 December 2018 he returned to Zaragoza for a third stint as manager replacing the dismissed Lucas Alcaraz.

Fernández resigned on 18 August 2020, after losing the play-off semi-finals to Elche CF. On 11 March 2024, after nearly four years without a club, he returned to Zaragoza for his fourth spell.

On 18 December 2024, Fernández resigned again. He announced his decision while holding a press conference, and in the aftermath of a seven-game winless run.

== Managerial statistics ==
As of match played 17 December 2024

Managerial record by team and tenure
Team	Nat	From	To	Record								Ref
Team	Nat	From	To	G	W	D	L	GF	GA	GD	Win %	Ref
Zaragoza B	(Spain)	1 July 1990	4 March 1991	26	12	5	9	41	28	+13	46.15	
Zaragoza	(Spain)	4 March 1991	8 November 1996	279	112	72	95	391	345	+46	40.14	
Tenerife	(Spain)	1 July 1997	10 November 1997	12	3	3	6	15	24	−9	25.00	
Celta	(Spain)	30 May 1998	18 May 2002	207	93	54	60	330	236	+94	44.93	
Betis	(Spain)	18 May 2002	30 June 2004	90	36	27	27	129	109	+20	40.00	
Porto	(Portugal)	11 August 2004	31 January 2005	29	12	10	7	31	23	+8	41.38	
Zaragoza	(Spain)	6 June 2006	14 January 2008	68	26	21	21	98	84	+14	38.24	
Betis	(Spain)	26 January 2010	12 July 2010	21	11	8	2	32	15	+17	52.38	
Gent	(Belgium)	9 January 2013	30 September 2013	29	14	9	6	41	32	+9	48.28	
Deportivo La Coruña	(Spain)	10 July 2014	9 April 2015	32	6	10	16	27	52	−25	18.75	
Zaragoza	(Spain)	17 December 2018	18 August 2020	72	31	17	24	97	87	+10	43.06	
Zaragoza	(Spain)	11 March 2024	18 December 2024	34	11	11	12	51	43	+8	32.35	
Total				899	367	247	285	1,283	1,078	+205	40.82	—

== Honours ==
Zaragoza

- Copa del Rey: 1993–94
- UEFA Cup Winners' Cup: 1994–95

Celta

- UEFA Intertoto Cup: 2000

Porto

- Supertaça Cândido de Oliveira: 2004
- Intercontinental Cup: 2004
