= Francisco Noguerol =

Spanish footballer (born 1976)

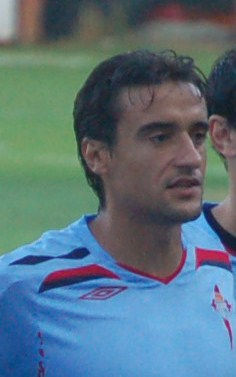
- Noguerol lining up for Celta in 2009

Personal information
- Full name: Francisco Antonio Noguerol Freijedo
- Date of birth: 9 July 1976 (age 50)
- Place of birth: San Cristovo de Cea, Spain
- Height: 1.83 m (6 ft 0 in)
- Position: Centre-back

Team information
- Current team: Albacete (assistant)

Youth career
- Celta

Senior career*
Years	Team	Apps	(Gls)
1995–1997	Celta B	65	(1)
1997–1998	→ Pontevedra (loan)	34	(0)
1998–2000	→ Racing Ferrol (loan)	67	(0)
2000–2002	Celta	4	(0)
2001–2002	→ Elche (loan)	40	(0)
2002–2004	Salamanca	70	(1)
2004–2006	Elche	68	(0)
2006–2008	Albacete	80	(1)
2008–2010	Celta	52	(0)
2010–2011	Girona	19	(0)
2011–2015	Albacete	100	(0)
Total		599	(3)

Managerial career
- 2015–2016: Albacete B
- 2016–2018: Albacete (assistant)
- 2018–2019: Albacete B
- 2020–: Albacete (assistant)
- 2021: Albacete (interim)
- * Club domestic league appearances and goals

Francisco Antonio Noguerol Freijedo (born 9 July 1976) is a Spanish former professional footballer who played as a central defender. He is currently assistant manager of Segunda División club Albacete.

He totalled 341 matches and two goals in the Segunda División over 11 seasons, representing five teams in the competition. In La Liga, he appeared for Celta.

== Club career ==
Noguerol was born in San Cristovo de Cea, Province of Ourense. After emerging through local giants Celta de Vigo's youth ranks he made his professional debut also in Galicia, loaned in the lower leagues. He rejoined Celta for the 2000–01 season but only appeared in four La Liga games, following which he returned to Segunda División, going on to have a steady career in that tier (for instance, from 2006 to 2008, at Albacete, he played 80 out of 82 possible league matches).

For the 2008–09 campaign, the 32-year-old Noguerol returned to Celta, still in division two, for a third spell. He was relatively used in his two-year stay as the side constantly battled with relegation, eventually managing to stay afloat.

On 7 June 2015, after five seasons between Girona and Albacete, competing in both the second and third tiers, Noguerol announced his retirement at the age of 38, being immediately appointed manager of his last club's reserves. In 2016, he became an assistant to the first team, only to return to his previous role on 27 June 2018.

== Managerial statistics ==
As of 30 May 2021

Managerial record by team and tenure
Team	Nat	From	To	Record								Ref
Team	Nat	From	To	G	W	D	L	GF	GA	GD	Win %	Ref
Albacete B	(Spain)	7 June 2015	9 June 2016	38	10	16	12	47	51	−4	26.32	
Albacete B	(Spain)	27 June 2018	8 October 2019	46	17	14	15	69	58	+11	36.96	
Albacete (interim)	(Spain)	4 May 2021	2 June 2021	5	1	2	2	6	7	−1	20.00	
Career total				89	28	32	29	122	116	+6	31.46	—

== Honours ==
Celta

- UEFA Intertoto Cup: 2000
