= Valery Karpin =

Russian football manager

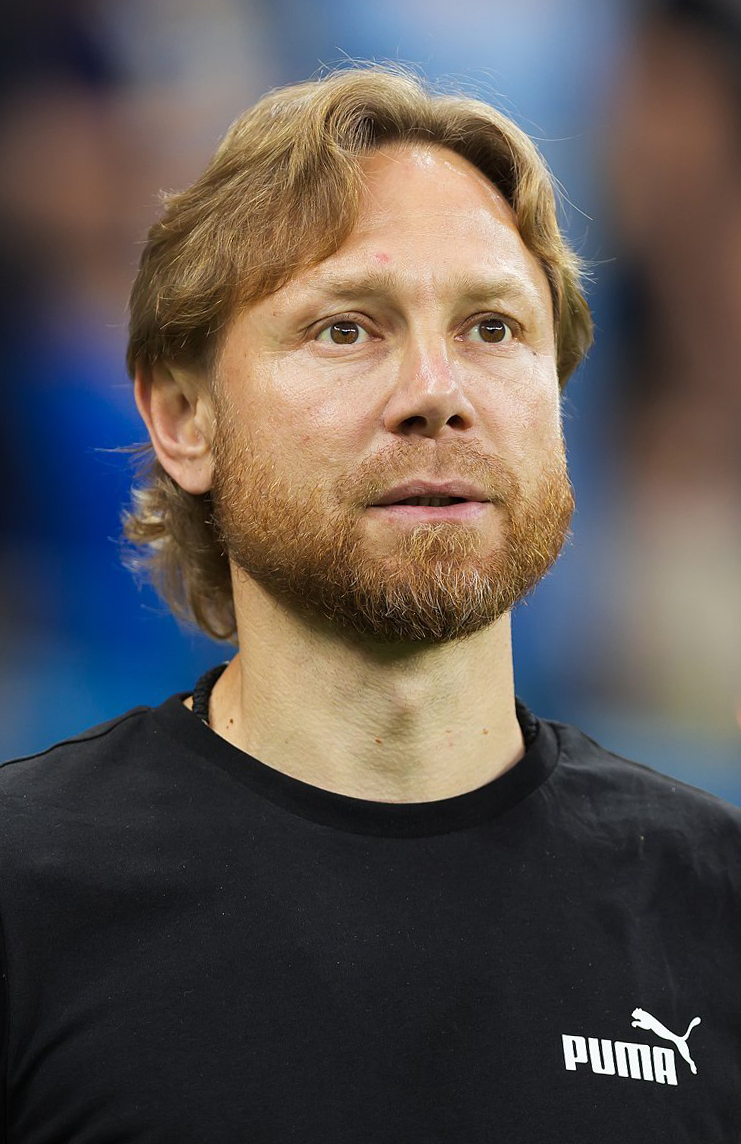
- Karpin coaching Rostov in 2022

Personal information
- Full name: Valery Georgiyevich Karpin
- Date of birth: 2 February 1969 (age 57)
- Place of birth: Narva, then part of Estonian SSR, Soviet Union
- Height: 1.85 m (6 ft 1 in)
- Position: Midfielder

Team information
- Current team: Russia (manager)

Senior career*
Years	Team	Apps	(Gls)
1986–1988	Sport Tallinn	25	(1)
1988	CSKA Moscow	3	(0)
1989	Fakel Voronezh	27	(7)
1990–1994	Spartak Moscow	117	(28)
1994–1996	Real Sociedad	72	(16)
1996–1997	Valencia	36	(6)
1997–2002	Celta Vigo	168	(26)
2002–2005	Real Sociedad	108	(20)
Total		556	(104)

International career
1992	CIS	1	(0)
1992–2003	Russia	72	(17)

Managerial career
- 2009–2012: Spartak Moscow
- 2012–2014: Spartak Moscow
- 2014–2015: Mallorca
- 2015–2016: Torpedo Armavir
- 2017–2021: Rostov
- 2021–: Russia
- 2022–2025: Rostov
- 2025: Dynamo Moscow
- * Club domestic league appearances and goals

Valery Georgiyevich Karpin (Russian: Валерий Георгиевич Карпин; born 2 February 1969) is a Russian football manager and former player who manages the Russian national team. As a player, he was a midfielder and spent most of his career at Spartak Moscow, Real Sociedad and Celta Vigo. He holds citizenships of Russia, Spain and Estonia.

== Club career ==
At club level, Karpin played for Fakel Voronezh (1989), Spartak Moscow (1990–94), Real Sociedad (1994–96 and 2002–05), Valencia (1996–97) and Celta Vigo (1997–2002).

== International career ==
Karpin was capped 72 times for Russia, scoring 17 goals (he was also capped once for the CIS). He scored Russia's first goal after the breakup of the Soviet Union, in a 2–0 win against Mexico on 17 August 1992. Karpin played for Russia at the 1994 World Cup, Euro 1996, and the 2002 World Cup. In 2003, he won the Cyprus International Football Tournament when Russia beat Romania.

== Managerial career ==
=== Earlier managerial career ===
In August 2008, Karpin was named as Director General of Spartak Moscow, replacing Sergei Shavlo. In April 2009, following a poor run of results, he replaced Michael Laudrup as caretaker manager of the club. On 18 April 2011, Karpin declared resignation from his position following one of the worse starts in club history. Eventually, he continued working as a manager up to the end of 2011–12 season.

After the sacking of the newly appointed manager Unai Emery on 25 November 2012, Karpin took the responsibility of caretaker manager up until the end of the year. He later officially became the team's coach again and was not the caretaker anymore.

On 18 March 2014, Karpin was relieved from his duties, after exiting the Russian Cup to third division FC Tosno and drawing with top flight's bottom side Anzhi Makhachkala.

On 12 August 2014, he was appointed at the helm of RCD Mallorca.

He joined Torpedo Armavir for the 2015–16 season after it was newly promoted to FNL. Under his management, the team (by then renamed to FC Armavir) was relegated back to the third-tier PFL, and on 23 June 2016, he left the club "by mutual consent".

=== FC Rostov and Russia ===
On 19 December 2017, Karpin was announced as the new manager of FC Rostov on a two-and-a-half-year contract.

On 23 July 2021, Russian Football Union hired him as manager of the Russia national team until 31 December 2021 (for the duration of the World Cup qualification campaign). He was expected to continue coaching FC Rostov at the same time until that date. The contract has an option to be extended beyond that date. 10 days later, after just two games coaching both Rostov and national team, on 2 August 2021 he left Rostov by mutual consent.

Russia under Karpin qualified for the second round of World Cup qualifiers after finishing second in their group. However, on 28 February 2022, FIFA and UEFA suspended Russian clubs and national teams from international competition until further notice, due to the Russian invasion of Ukraine. On 10 March 2022, Karpin extended his contract with the national team until the end of 2022, and also returned to the manager position at FC Rostov. Russian Football Union president Aleksandr Dyukov clarified that Karpin would have to leave Rostov and focus on the national team job in case RFU's pending appeal of the disqualification to CAS is successful or disqualification is lifted otherwise. He was selected coach of the month by Russian Premier League for April 2022 and again for September 2022 and November 2022.

On 5 November 2022, Karpin extended his contract as the national team manager to 1 August 2024, with the suspension from international competitions still in place.

Karpin was voted league's coach of the month once again for March 2024.

On 28 June 2024, Karpin extended his contract with the national team to July 2028.

On 25 February 2025, Karpin resigned from his Rostov position to focus on the national team job.

=== Dynamo Moscow ===
On 13 June 2025, Karpin signed a three-year contract with Dynamo Moscow, while also staying with the national team. Russian Football Union agreed to the arrangement, until the national team's international suspension is lifted. Karpin resigned from Dynamo on 17 November 2025 to focus on the national team, with the club in 10th place.

== TV career ==
In 2016, he started working as analyst with Match TV. On 16 February 2017, he was appointed editor-in-chief of football broadcasts for the channel. He left the channel on 24 July 2017.

== Personal life ==
Karpin has four daughters named Veronika (born in 1990), Maria (born 23 February 1996), Valeria (born 18 February 2001) and Daria (born 4 September 2018). Since 2017, Karpin is married to an English teacher, singer, and amateur skater Daria Gordeeva (before that he was married twice). Karpin has Russian citizenship. In 2003 he acquired Estonian citizenship, he is an Estonian citizen through his father's family. He later also received Spanish citizenship after playing in Spain for several years.

In a 2022 interview, Karpin hoped for peace after the Russian invasion of Ukraine.

== After retirement ==
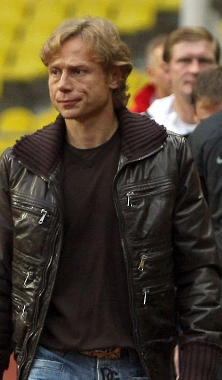
Valery Karpin in 2009

In 2007, Karpin became the holder of road bicycle racing team Karpin–Galicia. He also owns a real estate company with former Celta Vigo teammate Míchel Salgado.

In 2009, he was part of the Russian squad that won the 2009 Legends Cup.

== Career statistics ==
=== Club ===
Appearances and goals by club, season and competition
Club	Season	League			Cup		Continental		Total	
Club	Season	Division	Apps	Goals	Apps	Goals	Apps	Goals	Apps	Goals
Sport Tallinn	1986	Soviet Second League	10	1	—		—		10	1
Sport Tallinn	1987	Soviet Second League	15	0	—		—		15	0
Sport Tallinn	Total		25	1	0	0	0	0	25	1
CSKA Moscow	1988	Soviet First League	3	0	0	0	—		3	0
Fakel Voronezh	1989	Soviet First League	27	7	0	0	—		27	7
Spartak Moscow	1990	Soviet Top League	21	0	3	0	4 (Note: Appearances in European Cup / UEFA Champions League)	0	28	0
Spartak Moscow	1991	Soviet Top League	28	3	5	1	8 (Note: Four appearances in European Cup, four appearances and one goal in UEFA Cup)	1	41	5
Spartak Moscow	1992	Russian Top League	26	7	3	1	4 (Note: Appearances in European Cup Winners' Cup)	2	33	10
Spartak Moscow	1993	Russian Top League	30	13	2	1	10 (Note: Four appearances and two goals in European Cup Winners' Cup, six appearances and two goals in UEFA Champions League)	4	42	18
Spartak Moscow	1994	Russian Top League	12	5	3	3	4	3	19	11
Spartak Moscow	Total		117	28	16	6	30	10	163	44
Real Sociedad	1994–95	La Liga	35	3	3	0	—		38	3
Real Sociedad	1995–96	La Liga	37	13	2	1	—		39	14
Real Sociedad	Total		72	16	5	1	0	0	77	17
Valencia	1996–97	La Liga	36	6	2	0	8 (Note: Appearances in UEFA Cup)	0	46	6
Celta Vigo	1997–98	La Liga	37	4	5	1	—		42	5
Celta Vigo	1998–99	La Liga	34	8	2	0	7	1	43	9
Celta Vigo	1999–2000	La Liga	34	6	2	0	10	5	46	11
Celta Vigo	2000–01	La Liga	30	5	6	1	13 (Note: Four appearances and two goals in UEFA Intertoto Cup, nine appearances and one goal in UEFA Cup)	3	49	9
Celta Vigo	2001–02	La Liga	33	3	2	0	3	2	38	5
Celta Vigo	Total		168	26	17	2	33	11	218	39
Real Sociedad	2002–03	La Liga	36	8	1	0	—		37	8
Real Sociedad	2003–04	La Liga	38	7	0	0	8	0	46	7
Real Sociedad	2004–05	La Liga	34	5	0	0	—		34	5
Real Sociedad	Total		108	20	1	0	8	0	117	20
Career total			556	104	41	9	79	21	676	134

=== International ===
Appearances and goals by national team and year
National team	Year	Apps	Goals
CIS	1992	1	0
Total		1	0
Russia	1992	3	1
Russia	1993	6	0
Russia	1994	6	1
Russia	1995	8	3
Russia	1996	12	4
Russia	1997	2	0
Russia	1998	5	0
Russia	1999	9	6
Russia	2000	4	1
Russia	2001	9	0
Russia	2002	7	1
Russia	2003	1	0
Total		72	17

Scores and results list Russia's goal tally first, score column indicates score after each Karpin goal.

List of international goals scored by Valery Karpin
No.	Date	Venue	Opponent	Score	Result	Competition
1	16 August 1992	RZD Arena, Moscow, Russia	Mexico	1–0	2–0	Friendly
2	12 October 1994	Luzhniki Stadium, Moscow, Russia	San Marino	1–0	4–0	UEFA Euro 1996 qualifying
3	16 August 1995	Helsinki Olympic Stadium, Helsinki, Finland	Finland	2–0	6–0	UEFA Euro 1996 qualifying
9	10 November 1996	Stade Josy Barthel, Luxembourg City, Luxembourg	Luxembourg	4–0	4–0	1998 FIFA World Cup qualification
10	27 March 1999	Hrazdan Stadium, Yerevan, Armenia	Armenia	1–0	3–0	UEFA Euro 2000 qualifying
11	27 March 1999	Hrazdan Stadium, Yerevan, Armenia	Armenia	2–0	3–0	UEFA Euro 2000 qualifying
12	5 June 1999	Stade de France, Paris, France	France	3–2	3–2	UEFA Euro 2000 qualifying
13	9 June 1999	Dynamo Stadium, Moscow, Russia	Iceland	1–0	1–0	UEFA Euro 2000 qualifying
14	4 September 1999	Luzhniki Stadium, Moscow, Russia	Armenia	2–0	2–0	UEFA Euro 2000 qualifying
15	9 October 1999	Luzhniki Stadium, Moscow, Russia	Ukraine	1–0	1–1	UEFA Euro 2000 qualifying
17	5 June 2002	Noevir Stadium Kobe, Kobe, Japan	Tunisia	2–0	2–0	2002 FIFA World Cup

== Managerial statistics ==
As of match played 17 November 2026

Managerial record by team and tenure
Team	From	To	Record				
Team	From	To	P	W	D	L	Win %
Spartak Moscow	16 April 2009	30 June 2012	122	61	27	34	50.00
Spartak Moscow	26 November 2012	18 March 2014	39	19	9	11	48.72
Mallorca	12 August 2014	10 February 2015	25	7	6	12	28.00
Torpedo Armavir	10 July 2015	23 June 2016	40	11	10	19	27.50
Rostov	19 December 2017	2 August 2021	111	42	29	40	37.84
Russia	23 July 2021	Present	41	27	11	3	65.85
Rostov	10 March 2022	25 February 2025	118	54	27	37	45.76
Dynamo Moscow	13 June 2025	16 November 2025	22	8	7	7	36.36
Total			518	229	126	163	44.21

== Honours ==
Spartak Moscow

- Russian Top League: 1992, 1993, 1994
- Soviet Cup: 1991–92

Celta

- UEFA Intertoto Cup: 2000
- Copa del Rey runner-up: 2000–01

Individual

- Winner of the National Team Leader Prize: 2000
