= Eduardo Berizzo =

Argentine football manager (born 1969)

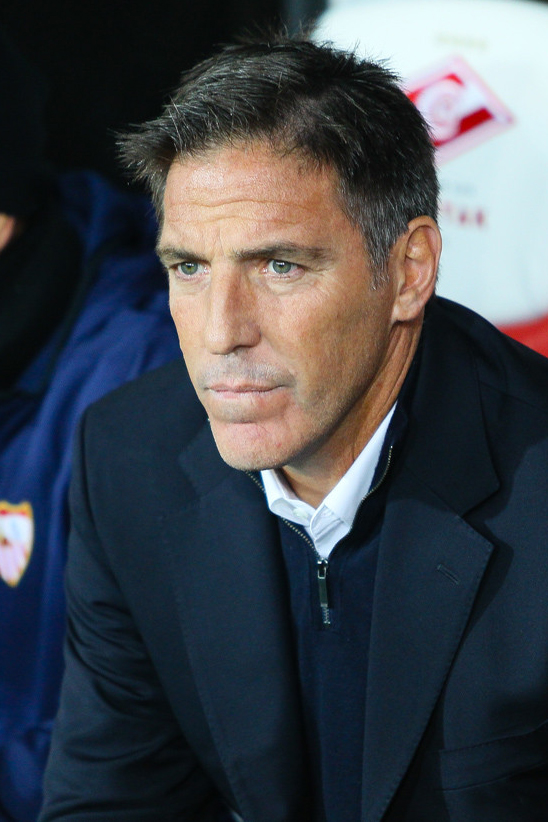
- Berizzo managing Sevilla in 2017

Personal information
- Full name: Manuel Eduardo Berizzo Magnolo
- Date of birth: 13 November 1969 (age 56)
- Place of birth: Cruz Alta, Argentina
- Height: 1.84 m (6 ft 0 in)
- Position: Centre-back

Senior career*
Years	Team	Apps	(Gls)
1988–1993	Newell's Old Boys	126	(10)
1993–1996	Atlas	94	(10)
1996–1999	River Plate	94	(3)
1999–2000	Marseille	13	(0)
2000	→ River Plate (loan)	30	(2)
2001–2005	Celta	101	(4)
2005–2006	Cádiz	14	(0)
Total		472	(29)

International career
1996–2000	Argentina	13	(0)

Managerial career
- 2007–2010: Chile (assistant)
- 2011: Estudiantes LP
- 2011–2014: O'Higgins
- 2014–2017: Celta
- 2017: Sevilla
- 2018: Athletic Bilbao
- 2019–2021: Paraguay
- 2022–2023: Chile
- 2022–2023: Chile Olympic
- 2024–2025: León
- * Club domestic league appearances and goals

Manuel Eduardo Berizzo Magnolo (Latin American Spanish: [eˈðwaɾðo βeˈɾiso]; (Note: In isolation, Berizzo is pronounced [beˈɾiso].) born 13 November 1969) is an Argentine former professional footballer who played as a central defender, currently a manager.

During his 18-year career, he played for six teams in four countries, mainly Newell's Old Boys, River Plate and Celta. He represented Argentina in two Copa América tournaments.

Berizzo managed in the top leagues of Argentina, Chile and Spain, leading O'Higgins to their first major honours and taking charge of three La Liga teams including Celta. He was also head coach of the national teams of Paraguay and Chile, going to two Copa América editions with the former.

== Club career ==
=== Newell's and Atlas ===
Born in Cruz Alta, Marcos Juárez, Córdoba, Berizzo was playing in a children's league when he and friend Dario Franco were scouted for Newell's Old Boys by manager Marcelo Bielsa. He helped the team to two Primera División titles, as well as the Copa Libertadores finals of 1988 and 1992, lost to Club Nacional de Football and São Paulo FC, respectively; in the latter final, he scored the only goal of the first leg from a penalty kick, but was the first to miss in the penalty shootout that decided the tie at the Estádio do Morumbi. He was part of a trio within the team known as Los tres chiflados ("The Three Stooges"), taking the role of Moe alongside Julio Saldaña (Larry) and Alfredo Berti (Curly).

In 1993, as Newell's sought to renew their team and transfers to Sporting de Gijón and Udinese Calcio in Europe did not materialise, Berizzo signed for Mexico's Atlas F.C. under Bielsa. Arriving with a knee injury, he adapted to the country's heat and altitude and became captain. After three seasons that he described as "not good but excellent", he was about to sign a five-year contract extension when an offer came through from Club Atlético River Plate in his country; club president Francisco Ibarra retired his number 2 jersey for the rest of his term.

=== River Plate and Marseille ===
At River, Berizzo played in central defence alongside Paraguayan Celso Ayala in a team that won four consecutive league tournaments and the 1997 Supercopa Libertadores. His solid performances eventually attracted the attention of French club Olympique de Marseille, who signed him in July 1999 on a three-year deal for a fee of 20 million francs (€3 million) to replace 1998 FIFA World Cup winner Laurent Blanc. After a 5–1 loss at AS Saint-Étienne on 11 December, he argued with new manager Bernard Casoni; unsettled and out of form, he was loaned to his former team in January 2000.

Known initially as "Totito", Berizzo inherited the nickname "Toto" from his father, who died in a car accident in March 2000 after watching him play for River against Club Universidad de Chile in the Libertadores. He won another Clausura tournament that year.

=== Celta ===
Berizzo moved to Spain with RC Celta de Vigo, in another winter transfer move. He was an important defensive unit for the Galicians, contributing 17 La Liga matches in his first year as they finished in sixth position; in a run to the final of the Copa del Rey, he scored in each leg of a 4–2 aggregate win over FC Barcelona in the semi-finals in June 2001, the second at the Camp Nou being Pep Guardiola's farewell for the hosts. In his second full season he registered career-bests (at Celta) 27 games with two goals, helping the side to reach the UEFA Champions League for the first time ever.

In the 2003–04 campaign, Berizzo was sent off four times, twice in the last two rounds, as Celta eventually dropped down a level. He also made five appearances in a round-of-16 run in European competition, eventually losing his importance and being released in June 2005 at 35.

=== Later career ===
Berizzo stayed in Spain and signed a one-year contract with Cádiz CF, appearing scarcely and suffering another top-flight relegation. He retired at the end of the season.

The bearer of an Italian passport, Berizzo did not occupy a non-European Union spot while competing in the continent.

== International career ==
Having played for the under-23 team that missed out in qualification for the 1992 Olympic tournament, Berizzo made his debut for Argentina in the 1998 FIFA World Cup qualifying stage against Venezuela, on 9 October 1996. He was picked up for the squads for the 1997 Copa América – only playing in the quarter-final loss to Peru and being sent off after two yellow cards– and the 1999 Copa América, where he was not used.

Berizzo's last international took place on 15 November 2000, in the 2002 World Cup qualifier against Chile, appearing seven minutes in a 2–0 away win. He broke his ankle in February 2002, completely ruling him out of the final stages in South Korea and Japan.

== Coaching career ==
=== Early years ===
When Bielsa took over as Chile manager in July 2007, Berizzo became assistant manager. On 10 October 2009, in a World Cup qualifier against Colombia (4–2 away victory), he was ejected alongside Fabián Orellana and eventually received a four-match ban, not being present on the bench for the entirety of the final stages in South Africa.

On 7 February 2011, Berizzo was hired in his own right at Argentine defending champions Estudiantes de La Plata, after the resignation of Alejandro Sabella. His first game four days later was a 2–1 home win over his former club, Newell's. He resigned on 30 May after a poor run of form, including elimination from the Copa Libertadores by Paraguay's Cerro Porteño in the last 16.

=== O'Higgins ===
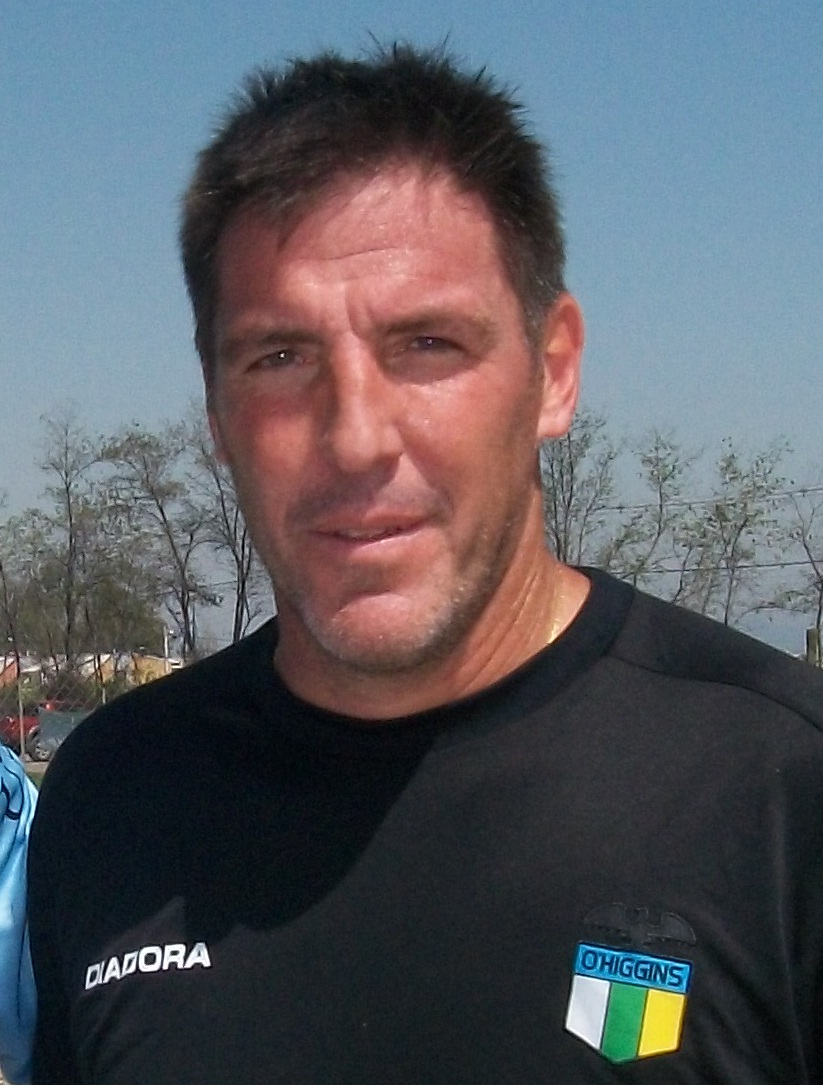
Berizzo as O'Higgins manager in October 2012

Berizzo signed a two-year deal with O'Higgins F.C. of the Chilean Primera División on 2 December 2011. He achieved runner-up honours in his debut season, losing the final against Club Universidad de Chile in a penalty shootout.

On 10 December 2013, Berizzo led the team from Rancagua to the 2013 Apertura, the first title in their 58-year history. The following 3 May, they won the Supercopa de Chile against Deportes Iquique, again on penalties; he had already agreed that this would be his last game.

=== La Liga ===
On 19 May 2014, Berizzo returned to Celta but as a manager, replacing FC Barcelona-bound Luis Enrique on a two-year deal. In his third, he coached the side to the last-four stage in both the Copa del Rey and the UEFA Europa League.

Berizzo was confirmed as the new manager of Sevilla FC on 27 May 2017, replacing countryman Jorge Sampaoli who accepted the Argentina job. On 22 November, it was announced he had been diagnosed with prostate cancer; a month later, he was fired due to a poor run of results. Much of his short time at the club was recorded in the Amazon Prime television documentary series Six Dreams, in which he was one of its stars.

Berizzo returned to active on 31 May 2018, being appointed at Athletic Bilbao. After winning only two of his 15 competitive matches in charge and with the team in the relegation zone, he was dismissed.

=== Paraguay ===
On 18 February 2019, Berizzo was named Paraguay's new coach after Juan Carlos Osorio's resignation. At the year's Copa América in Brazil, he led the team to the quarter-finals where they were eliminated on penalties after a goalless draw with the hosts. Two years later, the national side fell at the same stage on the same method against Peru.

Berizzo was relieved of his duties on 15 October 2021, following a 4–0 loss in Bolivia in the World Cup qualifiers.

=== Chile ===
Berizzo was hired on a four-year contract to be the manager of Chile on 26 May 2022, after the dismissal of Martín Lasarte for failing to reach the World Cup. His first game on 6 June was a 2–0 friendly loss away to South Korea; this was followed by defeats to Tunisia and Ghana at the Kirin Cup in Japan.

Berizzo did not win until his eighth game, a 3–2 exhibition win over Paraguay on 28 March 2023. Having taken one win and two draws from the first five games of 2026 World Cup qualification, he resigned on 17 November 2023.

=== León ===
On 7 September 2024, Berizzo returned to club duties by joining Club León of Liga MX. One year later, he resigned.

== Remarks on homosexuality ==
Shortly after leaving Marseille, Berizzo spoke out against alleged homosexuality in France:

"A bunch of faggots is what you have in French football. There are so many homosexual players there, they always provoke you, they touch your thighs, your bum, to see if you will give some kind of signal. I feel disgusted when a homosexual shares the same shower and stares at one's bum with desire, and even gets emotional when you are naked."

— Berizzo quoted in a Daily Telegraph article.

The day after that quote was published by Mexican newspaper La Crónica de Hoy, he denied having said that:

"It is an outrage. This is serious. That note never existed. I have no problem with having a gay colleague. People can do whatever they want to do with their private life."

— Berizzo quoted by Clarín.

== Managerial statistics ==
As of match played 27 September 2025

Managerial record by team and tenure
Team	Nat	From	To	Record								Ref
Team	Nat	From	To	G	W	D	L	GF	GA	GD	Win %	Ref
Estudiantes	(Argentina)	4 February 2011	30 May 2011	23	8	7	8	23	28	−5	34.78	
O'Higgins	(Chile)	3 November 2011	2 June 2014	122	63	29	30	191	126	+65	51.64	
Celta	(Spain)	2 June 2014	27 May 2017	148	61	36	51	205	207	−2	41.22	
Sevilla	(Spain)	27 May 2017	22 December 2017	27	14	6	7	43	37	+6	51.85	
Athletic Bilbao	(Spain)	31 May 2018	4 December 2018	15	2	8	5	18	23	−5	13.33	
Paraguay	(Paraguay)	18 February 2019	15 October 2021	31	7	13	11	31	39	−8	22.58	
Chile	(Chile)	26 May 2022	16 November 2023	16	4	6	6	16	17	−1	25.00	
Chile Olympic	(Chile)	26 May 2022	16 November 2023	8	6	1	1	18	7	+11	75.00	
León	(Mexico)	7 September 2024	27 September 2025	44	15	12	17	53	61	−8	34.09	
Total				434	180	118	136	598	545	+53	41.47	

== Honours ==
=== Player ===
Newell's

- Argentine Primera División: 1990–91, Clausura 1992

River Plate

- Argentine Primera División: Apertura 1996, Clausura 1997, Apertura 1997, Clausura 2000
- Supercopa Libertadores: 1997

=== Manager ===
O'Higgins

- Primera División de Chile: Apertura 2013
- Supercopa de Chile: 2014

Chile Olympic

- Pan American Games: (silver) 2023
