= Everton Giovanella =

Brazilian footballer (born 1970)

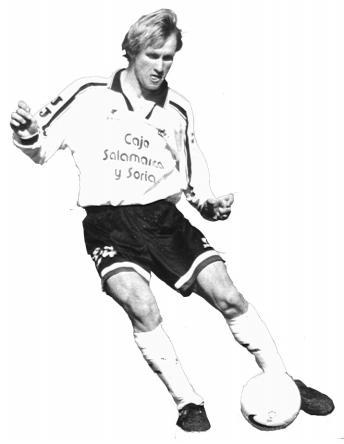
- Giovanella in action for Salamanca

Personal information
- Full name: Everton Giovanella
- Date of birth: 13 September 1970 (age 56)
- Place of birth: Caxias do Sul, Brazil
- Height: 1.77 m (5 ft 10 in)
- Position: Defensive midfielder

Senior career*
Years	Team	Apps	(Gls)
1991–1992	Lajeadense	38	(8)
1993	Internacional	12	(2)
1993–1994	Tirsense	18	(1)
1994–1995	Estoril	29	(0)
1995–1996	Belenenses	19	(3)
1996–1999	Salamanca	106	(4)
1999–2006	Celta	140	(1)
2007–2008	Coruxo	34	(0)
Total		396	(19)
- * Club domestic league appearances and goals

Everton Giovanella (born 13 September 1970) is a Brazilian former professional footballer who played as a defensive midfielder.

He spent most of his career in Spain – one decade – namely being an important part in Celta's La Liga and European consolidation.

== Club career ==
Giovanella was born in Caxias do Sul, Rio Grande do Sul. He started out with a modest club in his country, then signed for Série A's SC Internacional from Porto Alegre, where he won the 1992 Copa do Brasil. In the middle of 1993 he emigrated to Portugal, spending one season each with Primeira Liga sides F.C. Tirsense, G.D. Estoril Praia and C.F. Os Belenenses.

For the 1996–97 campaign Giovanella moved to Spain, first achieving La Liga promotion with UD Salamanca then joining RC Celta de Vigo. At both teams, he reunited with his former Belenenses teammate Catanha and, with the Galicians, played an important role in their domestic and European exploits, but also unluckily injured Deportivo de La Coruña's Manuel Pablo in a derby on 30 September 2001.

In December 2004 (sanction ratified in September 2005), Giovanella was banned from football for two years after testing positive for nandrolone. He returned to football on 10 November 2007, teaming up for Coruxo FC in the Tercera División.

Giovanella rejoined his first senior club Clube Esportivo Lajeadense in the 2008 off-season, as its director of football. In the following year he returned to Celta, being appointed scout in Brazil.

== Honours ==
Internacional

- Copa do Brasil: 1992

Celta

- UEFA Intertoto Cup: 2000

== See also ==
- List of sportspeople sanctioned for doping offences
