= Juan Velasco (footballer) =

Spanish retired footballer

Personal information
- Full name: Juan Velasco Damas
- Date of birth: 17 May 1977 (age 49)
- Place of birth: Dos Hermanas, Spain
- Height: 1.79 m (5 ft 10 in)
- Position: Right-back

Youth career
- 1987–1995: Sevilla

Senior career*
Years	Team	Apps	(Gls)
1995–1996	Coria		
1996–1997	Sevilla B	14	(1)
1997–1999	Sevilla	79	(3)
1999–2004	Celta	134	(1)
2004–2006	Atlético Madrid	46	(0)
2006–2007	Espanyol	20	(0)
2008	Norwich City	3	(0)
2008–2009	Panthrakikos	25	(0)
2010–2011	AEL	27	(0)
Total		348	(5)

International career
1998–1999	Spain U21	5	(0)
2000	Spain	5	(0)

Managerial career
- 2013–2016: Xerez B
- 2016: Extremadura
- 2018–2019: Sevilla (youth)
- 2019–2020: Sevilla C
- 2021: Alcalá
- 2021–2022: Santa Coloma
- 2022: Inter d'Escaldes
- * Club domestic league appearances and goals

Juan Velasco Damas (born 17 May 1977) is a Spanish former professional footballer who played as a right-back. He is also a manager.

He represented eight clubs during his career, appearing in 213 matches in La Liga and scoring one goal. He also competed abroad in England and Greece.

Velasco represented Spain at Euro 2000.

== Club career ==
Born in Dos Hermanas, Province of Seville, Velasco started representing professionally local giants Sevilla FC, appearing in 13 La Liga matches in the 1996–97 season, which ended in relegation. His league debut occurred on 5 March 1997 in a 2–0 away loss against Rayo Vallecano, and in the following two years he totalled 72 official appearances, contributing prominently in the second as the Andalusians returned to the top flight.

After helping Sevilla to promote, Velasco joined RC Celta de Vigo, experiencing his most successful period: in 2002–03 he played 31 games to help the Galician club to qualify for the first time ever for the UEFA Champions League; in the following campaign, however, he saw them suffer relegation. He scored his only goal in the main division on 4 January 2000, closing the 1–1 draw at Valencia CF.

Velasco spent the next three years at Atlético Madrid (two) and RCD Espanyol, averaging 22 matches per season. On 18 February 2008, the free agent signed a three-month contract with Championship side Norwich City after a successful trial. At the end of the campaign he left for Panthrakikos FC, recently promoted to the Super League Greece.

After one and a half seasons, Velasco moved teams in January 2010 but stayed in the country, with Athlitiki Enosi Larissa FC. He retired in June of the following year at the age of 34, and in 2013 returned to football, being appointed manager of Xerez CD B.

On 13 October 2016, Velasco signed as head coach of Segunda División B's Extremadura UD.

== International career ==
Velasco was capped five times by Spain, his debut coming on 26 January 2000 in a 3–0 friendly win over Poland in Cartagena. Selected for UEFA Euro 2000, he did not leave the bench.

== Honours ==
Celta

- UEFA Intertoto Cup: 2000
