= Edu (footballer, born 1979) =

Brazilian footballer

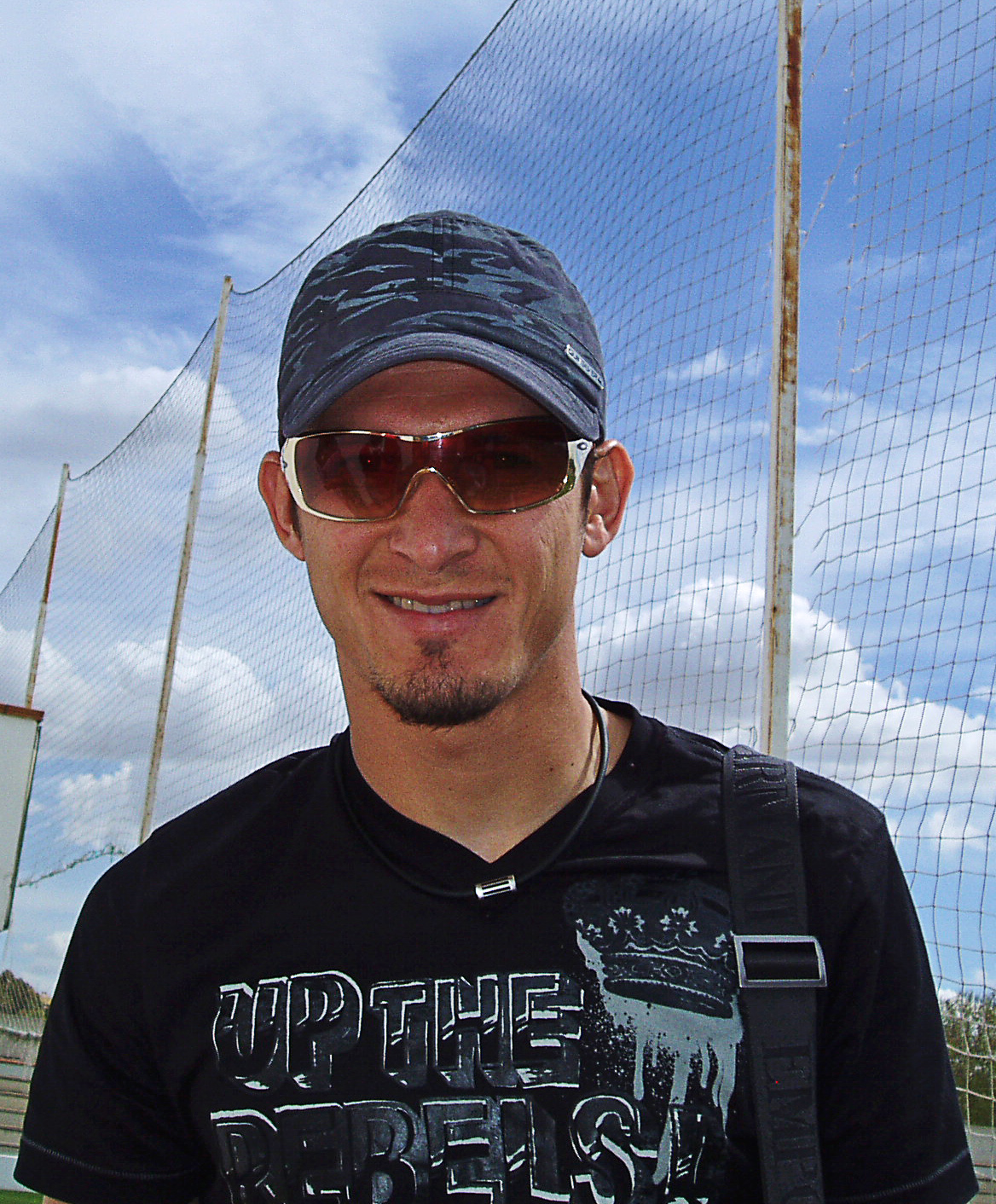
- Edu as a Betis player in 2008

Personal information
- Full name: Luís Eduardo Schmidt
- Date of birth: 10 January 1979 (age 47)
- Place of birth: Jaú, Brazil
- Height: 1.82 m (6 ft 0 in)
- Positions: Forward; midfielder

Youth career
- 1996–1997: XV Jaú

Senior career*
Years	Team	Apps	(Gls)
1998–2000	São Paulo	11	(0)
2000–2004	Celta	117	(27)
2004–2009	Betis	136	(36)
2009–2010	Internacional	25	(3)
2011	Vitória	5	(1)
2012	Colorado Rapids	9	(0)
Total		303	(67)

International career
1999–2000	Brazil U23	14	(8)
2000	Brazil	1	(0)
- * Club domestic league appearances and goals

Luís Eduardo Schmidt (born 10 January 1979), commonly known as Edu, is a Brazilian retired footballer.

A versatile midfielder and forward, he played most of his professional career in Spain – helping both Celta and Betis to their first-ever Champions League participation – amassing La Liga totals of 253 matches and 63 goals in nine years.

He started his career with São Paulo.

== Club career ==
Born in Jaú, São Paulo, Edu made only 11 Série A appearances for São Paulo FC over the course of three seasons, then transferred to Spain's RC Celta de Vigo for 2000–01. Even though he only scored three goals during his first year, he went on to become one of the Galician side's most important elements in the subsequent La Liga campaigns.

Hindered by injuries throughout 2003–04, Edu also played a small part in Celta's run in the UEFA Champions League, netting once against Arsenal in a round-of-16 home defeat (2–3). Upon the club's relegation he moved to Real Betis, spending the first two seasons on loan.

Edu made a huge impression during his first year in Andalusia, as his partnership with countryman Ricardo Oliveira featured strongly in the success of the club, who qualified to its first Champions League. He finished the campaign with 11 goals in 32 league appearances, with the team also winning the Copa del Rey.

In his second year, Edu only scored in three league matches, but started it by scoring a last-minute goal against AS Monaco FC in the Champions League third qualifying round, as the Verdiblancos went on to win 3–2 on aggregate.

After two seasons, Edu was officially signed for €2,000,000 in 2006. On the final day of 2006–07 he scored twice in the final ten minutes in a 2–0 win at Racing de Santander, which proved instrumental in avoiding relegation to the second division. In the following season, as Betis again battled relegation, he finished as the club's top scorer at 12; two of those came on 29 March 2008 as he netted the first and the last for his team in a 3–2 home win against FC Barcelona, who led 2–0 at half-time.

Edu appeared very rarely in the 2008–09 campaign due to injuries and Betis were relegated, with the played being released subsequently. Shortly after, he returned to Brazil after a nine-year absence and signed a two-year contract with Sport Club Internacional.

On 2 June 2011, aged 32, Edu joined Esporte Clube Vitória on a free transfer. On 26 April of the following year he signed for Colorado Rapids in the United States, being released by the Major League Soccer club on 16 November.

== International career ==
Edu made his Brazil debut against Thailand, on 23 February 2000. It would be his only cap for the full side.

Late in the summer, Edu scored twice at the 2000 Summer Olympics, as the country was ousted in the quarter-finals.

== Honours ==
Betis

- Copa del Rey: 2004–05

Brazil U23

- CONMEBOL Pre-Olympic Tournament: 2000
