= Juanfran (footballer, born 1976) =

Spanish footballer

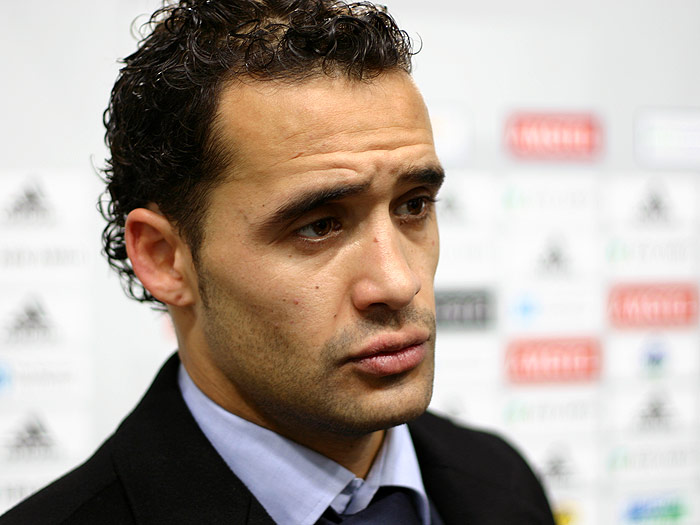

Personal information
- Full name: Juan Francisco García García
- Date of birth: 15 July 1976 (age 50)
- Place of birth: Valencia, Spain
- Height: 1.83 m (6 ft 0 in)
- Position: Defender

Team information
- Current team: Arenteiro (manager)

Youth career
- Levante

Senior career*
Years	Team	Apps	(Gls)
1994–1997	Levante	47	(1)
1997–1999	Valencia	41	(0)
1999–2004	Celta	126	(6)
2004–2006	Beşiktaş	13	(1)
2005–2006	→ Ajax (loan)	16	(0)
2006–2008	Zaragoza	62	(0)
2008–2010	AEK Athens	27	(0)
2010	→ Levante (loan)	19	(0)
2010–2016	Levante	153	(0)
Total		504	(8)

International career
1998	Spain U21	1	(0)
2000–2003	Spain	11	(0)

Managerial career
- 2020: Lugo
- 2023: Ponferradina
- 2024: Ponferradina
- 2026–: Arenteiro
- * Club domestic league appearances and goals

Juan Francisco García García (born 15 July 1976), known as Juanfran, is a Spanish former professional footballer who played mainly a left-back but also as a central defender. He is the manager of Primera Federación club Arenteiro.

He started and finished his extensive career with Levante, which he represented across all three major levels of Spanish football, going on to amass La Liga totals of 382 games and six goals over 15 seasons and also appearing in the competition for Valencia, Celta and Zaragoza. He also played in Turkey, the Netherlands and Greece.

Juanfran represented Spain at the 2002 World Cup.

== Club career ==
Born in Valencia, Valencian Community, Juanfran started his professional career at Levante UD, where he attracted the attention of local giants Valencia CF, signing after three seasons for €1 million. On 31 August 1997 he played his first La Liga game, a 2–1 away loss against RCD Mallorca, and went on to make 54 competitive appearances for the Che.

Juanfran joined RC Celta de Vigo prior to the 1999–2000 campaign for €4 million, where he was an undisputed starter in a Galician team that appeared in the UEFA Cup and the 2003–04 UEFA Champions League (he scored in a 1–1 draw at Club Brugge KV to progress to the knockout rounds of the latter competition). However, in 2003–04, they would also be relegated to Segunda División.

After leaving Celta in 2004, Juanfran joined Turkish club Beşiktaş JK, but soon fell out of favour with team management – the coach who brought him to Istanbul, compatriot Vicente del Bosque, was dismissed midway through the season – and would spend the following campaign on loan to Dutch side AFC Ajax.

In 2006–07, Juanfran returned to Spain and joined Real Zaragoza for €1.5 million, being a key defensive element to qualify for the UEFA Cup in that first year. The next season, the player struggled individually and collectively, and the Aragonese returned to the second division after a five-year stint.

Juanfran agreed to sign a two-year deal with AEK Athens F.C. on 30 July 2008, earning approximately €1 million per season. He was used regularly during his spell in Greece but, in late January 2010, was loaned to his first professional team Levante until the end of the second-tier campaign; only weeks later, he bought out his contract with AEK and signed permanently until June 2012, contributing massively to the former's top-flight return after a two-year absence.

The 34-year-old Juanfran was the most used player in his position in 2010–11 at 23 matches, as Levante eventually retained their status. He fared even better the following season, with the side finishing sixth and qualifying for the Europa League for the first time ever.

On 20 September 2012, in Levante's European competition group stage debut, Juanfran scored the game's only goal at home against Helsingborgs IF, netting with his preferred foot from the corner of the penalty area. On 4 May 2016, after a further four top-tier campaigns – suffering relegation in the last – the 39-year-old announced his retirement.

== International career ==
Juanfran earned 11 caps for Spain, making his debut in a friendly with Italy on 29 March 2000 after impressive displays at Celta. Subsequently, he was included in the nation's 2002 FIFA World Cup squad, and appeared in three matches out of five.

Juanfran's last game was an UEFA Euro 2004 qualifier against Northern Ireland in June 2003, playing the whole 90 minutes of a 0–0 away draw.

== Coaching career ==
On 10 December 2018, in an interview with Marca, Juanfran revealed he had signed for EFL Championship club Aston Villa as a scout, focusing primarily on Spain and Portugal. He stated "it is a privilege to work for a club like Aston Villa. Everyone identifies it as a big club in England and it’s a dream come true."

Juanfran was hired in his first managerial job on 30 June 2020, succeeding Curro Torres at a CD Lugo team in the second division's relegation zone. His debut the following day was a 3–1 home win over CD Numancia; he managed to narrowly avoid relegation, but was dismissed on 11 October after four losses in the first five matches of the new campaign.

On 10 April 2023, Juanfran returned to working in the same division at SD Ponferradina. He was their third coach of the season, tasked with its final seven matches, and left on 16 June after failing to prevent relegation.

Juanfran returned to Ponfe on 19 March 2024, with the club now in the Primera Federación, on a deal until the end of the campaign. Two years later, he was appointed at CD Arenteiro in the same league.

== Managerial statistics ==
As of match played 25 April 2026

Managerial record by team and tenure
Team	Nat	From	To	Record								Ref
Team	Nat	From	To	G	W	D	L	GF	GA	GD	Win %	Ref
Lugo	(Spain)	30 June 2020	11 October 2020	11	5	2	4	15	15	+0	45.45	
Ponferradina	(Spain)	10 April 2023	16 June 2023	7	2	3	2	13	12	+1	28.57	
Ponferradina	(Spain)	19 March 2024	19 June 2024	12	4	2	6	10	12	−2	33.33	
Arenteiro	(Spain)	3 March 2026	Present	8	0	3	5	6	13	−7	0.00	
Total				38	11	10	17	44	52	−8	28.95	—

== Honours ==
Levante

- Segunda División B: 1995–96

Valencia

- Copa del Rey: 1998–99
- UEFA Intertoto Cup: 1998

Celta

- UEFA Intertoto Cup: 2000

Ajax

- KNVB Cup: 2005–06

AEK

- Greek Football Cup runner-up: 2008–09
