= Catanha =

Spanish footballer (born 1972)

Personal information
- Full name: Henrique Guedes da Silva
- Date of birth: 6 March 1972 (age 54)
- Place of birth: Recife, Brazil
- Height: 1.75 m (5 ft 9 in)
- Position: Striker

Team information
- Current team: Conquense

Youth career
- Fluminense

Senior career*
Years	Team	Apps	(Gls)
1991–1992	São Cristóvão		
1992–1993	União São João		
1993–1995	CSA	53	(32)
1995	Paysandu	7	(4)
1995–1996	Belenenses	13	(12)
1996–1998	Salamanca	13	(1)
1997–1998	→ Leganés (loan)	34	(14)
1998–2000	Málaga	73	(49)
2000–2004	Celta	115	(37)
2004	→ Krylia Sovetov (loan)	11	(1)
2005	Belenenses	8	(0)
2005	Marília	8	(4)
2005	Atlético Mineiro	17	(5)
2006–2008	Linares	69	(26)
2008–2010	Estepona	48	(23)
2010	Corinthians-AL	0	(0)
2010–2011	CSA	7	(3)
2012	Sport Atalaia		
2016	Sete de Setembro		
2016	Zenit Torremolinos	3	(1)
2016–2017	Dos Hermanas	14	(4)
2017	Atlético Estación	2	(0)
2026–	Conquense	0	(0)

International career
2000	Spain	3	(0)

Managerial career
- 2016: Zenit Torremolinos (player-manager)
- 2017: Leo
- 2020–2021: Almuñécar City C
- 2021–2022: Almuñécar City
- 2022–: Nerja
- * Club domestic league appearances and goals

Henrique Guedes da Silva (born 6 March 1972), known as Catanha, is a professional footballer who plays as a striker for Segunda Federación club Conquense. Born in Brazil, he represented the Spain national team.

He played almost exclusively for modest clubs in his native Brazil (seven teams in total), except for a brief spell with Atlético Mineiro. He competed in Spain during 12 seasons, most notably with Celta, amassing La Liga totals of 148 matches and 62 goals in five years.

== Club career ==
Catanha was born in Recife. After having played with modest clubs in his native country, he arrived in 1995 in Portugal to play for C.F. Os Belenenses, teaming up with countryman Everton Giovanella with whom he would later play in two teams in Spain; there, he started competing in the second division, with UD Salamanca and CD Leganés.

Moving to Málaga CF for the 1998–99 season, Catanha contributed with 26 goals to the Andalusia side's La Liga promotion, and also won the Pichichi Trophy. He scored a further 24 in 1999–2000's top flight, tied for second with Atlético Madrid's Jimmy Floyd Hasselbaink.

Catanha joined RC Celta de Vigo in July 2000, being an instrumental part of the Galicians' domestic and European exploits in a three-year span. However, when the club played UEFA Champions League in the 2003–04 campaign, he only backed up Savo Milošević, and also suffered team relegation.

After that Catanha went pretty much unnoticed, representing FC Krylia Sovetov Samara, Belenenses, Marília Atlético Clube and Clube Atlético Mineiro. In January 2006 he returned to Spain, playing with modest CD Linares (third level, two-and-a-half seasons) and Unión Estepona CF (division four).

In early 2010, aged nearly 38, Catanha returned to his nation of birth, resuming his career in the lower leagues. After a career lasting well into his 40s and playing with his son Pedro at UD Dos Hermanas San Andrés, he finally retired from football in 2017, after a stint at Club Atlético Estación.

Catanha was announced as manager of Gibraltar Second Division side Leo F.C. in June 2017, but he resigned before appearing in a competitive game. He then became CD Estepona's director of football.

== International career ==
Catanha earned three caps for Spain – all in 2000 – despite being born in Brazil. His debut came on 7 October in a 2002 FIFA World Cup qualifier against Israel, coming on as a 71st-minute substitute for Ismael Urzaiz in a 2–0 home win.

Catanha was one of five black or mixed-race players to have played for Spain along with Thiago Alcântara, Donato, Vicente Engonga and Marcos Senna, all but the third being Brazilian nationals.

== See also ==
- List of Spain international footballers born outside Spain
