= 2002–03 Celta de Vigo season =

Celta Vigo
2002–03 season
- Manager: Miguel Ángel Lotina
- La Liga: 4th
- Copa del Rey: 2nd Round
- UEFA Cup: Round of 32
Home colours	Away colours	Third colours

Celta de Vigo participated in La Liga, Copa del Rey and the UEFA Cup in the 2002-03 season, for the first time qualifying for the UEFA Champions League, thanks to a fourth-placed finish in La Liga. This was the crown of the work former coach Víctor Fernández had put in to establish Celta as a credible force, and it was under Miguel Ángel Lotina's leadership the club reached the ultimate level of the "Euro Celta" era.

== Squad ==
Note: Flags indicate national team as defined under FIFA eligibility rules; some limited exceptions apply. Players may hold more than one non-FIFA nationality.

No.	Pos.	Nation	Player
1	GK	(Argentina) ARG	Pablo Cavallero
2	DF	(Spain) ESP	Juan Velasco
3	DF	(Brazil) BRA	Sylvinho
4	DF	(Argentina) ARG	Fernando Cáceres
5	MF	(Brazil) BRA	Everton Giovanella
6	DF	(Argentina) ARG	Eduardo Berizzo
7	MF	(Brazil) BRA	Vágner
8	MF	(Spain) ESP	Ángel
9	FW	(Egypt) EGY	Mido (on loan from Ajax)
10	MF	(Russia) RUS	Aleksandr Mostovoi
11	MF	(Argentina) ARG	Gustavo López
13	GK	(Spain) ESP	José Manuel Pinto
14	DF	(Spain) ESP	Juanfran
16	MF	(Spain) ESP	José Ignacio
17	DF	(Argentina) ARG	Sebastián Méndez

No.	Pos.	Nation	Player
18	DF	(Spain) ESP	Pablo Coira
19	MF	(Brazil) BRA	Edu
20	MF	(Spain) ESP	Jesuli
21	DF	(Spain) ESP	Sergio
22	MF	(France) FRA	Peter Luccin
24	FW	(Spain) ESP	Catanha
25	FW	(South Africa) RSA	Benni McCarthy
26	GK	(Spain) ESP	José Juan
27	DF	(Spain) ESP	Jorge Rodríguez
28	MF	(Spain) ESP	Borja Oubiña
29	MF	(Spain) ESP	Jonathan Aspas
30	FW	(Spain) ESP	César Olaiz
31	DF	(Spain) ESP	Iago Bouzón
32	MF	(Spain) ESP	Jacobo Campos
36	DF	(Spain) ESP	Israel

=== Left club during season ===
Note: Flags indicate national team as defined under FIFA eligibility rules; some limited exceptions apply. Players may hold more than one non-FIFA nationality.

No.	Pos.	Nation	Player
8	MF	(Spain) ESP	Jandro (on loan to Albacete)
9	FW	(Ecuador) ECU	Iván Kaviedes (on loan to Puebla)

No.	Pos.	Nation	Player
15	MF	(Brazil) BRA	Doriva (on loan to Middlesbrough)

== Competitions ==
=== La Liga ===
==== League table ====
Pos	Team	Pld	W	D	L	GF	GA	GD	Pts	Qualification or relegation
2	Real Sociedad	38	22	10	6	71	45	+26	76	Qualification for the Champions League group stage
3	Deportivo La Coruña	38	22	6	10	67	47	+20	72	Qualification for the Champions League third qualifying round
4	Celta Vigo	38	17	10	11	45	36	+9	61	Qualification for the Champions League third qualifying round
5	Valencia	38	17	9	12	56	35	+21	60	Qualification for the UEFA Cup first round
6	Barcelona	38	15	11	12	63	47	+16	56	Qualification for the UEFA Cup first round

Source: LFP
Rules for classification: 1st points; 2nd head-to-head points; 3rd head-to-head goal difference; 4th head-to-head away goals scored; 5th goal difference; 6th number of goals scored; 7th Fair-play points

==== Matches ====
1 September 2002 1	Sevilla	0–1	Celta Vigo
21:30 CEST			G. López 39'

15 September 2002 2	Celta Vigo	3–1	Mallorca
19:00 CEST	Catanha 27'; Jesuli 40, 83'		Niño 78'

22 September 2002 3	Recreativo Huelva	0–3	Celta Vigo
			Mostovoi 40, 70'; McCarthy 90'

29 September 2002 4	Celta Vigo	2–2	Málaga
18:00 CEST	Catanha 25' (pen.); Berizzo 38'		Musampa 14'; Cáceres 40' (o.g.)

6 October 2002 5	Valencia	0–1	Celta Vigo
19:00 CEST			Vágner 90'

20 October 2002 6	Celta Vigo	0–1	Rayo Vallecano
18:00 CEST			Bolo 6'

26 October 2002 7	Celta Vigo	0–0	Atlético Madrid
21:30 CEST

3 November 2002 8	Athletic Bilbao	2–1	Celta Vigo
17:00 CET	Etxeberría 80'; Urzaiz 90'		Edu 32'

10 November 2002 9	Celta Vigo	1–0	Espanyol
17:00 CET	José Ignacio 17'

17 November 2002 10	Real Betis	2–1	Celta Vigo
20:30 CET	Alfonso 71'; Joaquín 88'		José Ignacio 66'

24 November 2002 11	Celta Vigo	0–0	Osasuna
17:00 CET

1 December 2002 12	Real Valladolid	0–2	Celta Vigo
17:00 CET			Catanha 10'; Edu 53'

8 December 2002 13	Celta Vigo	2–1	Deportivo Alavés
17:00 CET	Karmona 21' (o.g.); Luccin 26' (pen.)		Ilie 49' (pen.)

15 December 2002 14	Racing Santander	3–0	Celta Vigo
17:00 CET	Moratón 59'; Benayoun 60, 73'

21 December 2002 15	Celta Vigo	3–1	Villarreal
20:30 CET	Catanha 1'; Edu 7'; Jesuli 63'		Palermo 44'

4 January 2003 16	Deportivo	3–0	Celta Vigo
	Tristán 43'; Sergio 48'; Luque 90 + 1'

11 January 2003 17	Celta Vigo	0–1	Real Madrid
21:00 CET			Ronaldo 6'

18 January 2003 18	Real Sociedad	1–0	Celta Vigo
20:00 CET	de Pedro 65'

26 January 2003 19	Celta Vigo	2–0	Barcelona
20:30 CET	Jesuli 47'; Sylvinho 73'

2 February 2003 20	Celta Vigo	0–1	Sevilla
17:00 CET			Casquero 78'

9 February 2003 21	Mallorca	0–2	Celta Vigo
17:00 CET			Edu 54, 64'

16 February 2003 22	Celta Vigo	4–1	Recreativo Huelva
17:00 CET	Edu 38, 56'; Jesuli 63, 70'		Sylvinho 90 + 2' (o.g.)

23 February 2003 23	Málaga	1–1	Celta Vigo
18:00 CET	Koke 89'		José Ignacio 5'

2 March 2003 24	Celta Vigo	1–1	Valencia
17:00 CET	Edu 10'		Carew 7'

9 March 2003 25	Rayo Vallecano	1–0	Celta Vigo
17:00 CET	de Quintana 86'

16 March 2003 26	Atlético Madrid	0–1	Celta Vigo
17:00 CET			Berizzo 87'

23 March 2003 27	Celta Vigo	2–1	Athletic Bilbao
17:00 CET	Mido 19'; McCarthy 77'		Del Horno 7'

5 April 2003 28	Espanyol	0–0	Celta Vigo
21:30 CEST

13 April 2003 29	Celta Vigo	1–0	Real Betis
18:00 CEST	Mostovoi 44'

20 April 2003 30	Osasuna	0–2	Celta Vigo
18:00 CEST			Mido 14, 50'

27 April 2003 31	Celta Vigo	0–0	Real Valladolid
18:00 CEST

4 May 2003 32	Deportivo Alavés	0–0	Celta Vigo
17:30 CEST

11 May 2003 33	Celta Vigo	2–2	Racing Santander
18:00 CEST	Juanfran 35'; Edu 84' (pen.)		Javi Guerrero 56' (pen.); Alonso 90 + 9'

18 May 2003 34	Villarreal	5–0	Celta Vigo	Estadio El Madrigal
18:00 CEST	Guayre 48, 88'; Víctor 53'; J. López 58'; Palermo 61'			Referee: Rodríguez Santiago

24 May 2003 35	Celta Vigo	3–0	Deportivo
20:45 CEST	Jesuli 56'; Edu 62, 73'

31 May 2003 36	Real Madrid	1–1	Celta Vigo
21:30 CEST	Raúl 68'		Mostovoi 35'

15 June 2003 37	Celta Vigo	3–2	Real Sociedad
21:00 CEST	Mostovoi 10, 49'; Mido 70'		Nihat 66, 83'

22 June 2003 38	Barcelona	2–0	Celta Vigo
21:00 CEST	Sorín 6'; Saviola 50'
