= 1999–2000 Celta de Vigo season =

Celta Vigo
1999–2000 season
- Chairman: Horacio Gomez
- Manager: Víctor Fernández
- La Liga: 7th
- Copa del Rey: Round of 16
- UEFA Cup: Quarter-finals
- Top goalscorer: League: Benni McCarthy (8); All: Benni McCarthy (16)
Home colours	Away colours	Third colours

Real Club Celta de Vigo contested La Liga, the UEFA Cup and Copa del Rey in the 1999–2000 season. Being title contenders up until Christmas, Celta lost their form in the second half of the season, aside from a 4–0 victory against Juventus in the last 16 of the UEFA Cup. The result was 7th and quarter finals of the UEFA Cup, which meant the side missed out on Champions League football once again. The club also missed the chance to become the first Spanish championship-winning team from Galicia, with arch rivals Deportivo de La Coruña winning La Liga.

== Squad ==
Note: Flags indicate national team as defined under FIFA eligibility rules; some limited exceptions apply. Players may hold more than one non-FIFA nationality.

No.	Pos.	Nation	Player
1	GK	FRA	Richard Dutruel
2	DF	ESP	Juan Velasco
3	DF	ESP	Rafael Berges
4	DF	ARG	Fernando Cáceres
5	MF	BRA	Everton Giovanella
6	MF	BRA	Mazinho
7	MF	ESP	Tomás
8	MF	RUS	Valeri Karpin
9	MF	ISR	Haim Revivo
10	MF	RUS	Aleksandr Mostovoi
11	MF	ARG	Gustavo López
12	FW	NED	Rick Hoogendorp
13	GK	ESP	José Manuel Pinto
14	DF	ESP	Juanfran

No.	Pos.	Nation	Player
16	MF	ESP	Albert Celades
17	FW	RSA	Benni McCarthy
18	DF	ESP	Pablo Coira
19	DF	YUG	Goran Đorović
20	DF	ARG	Nelson Vivas
21	DF	ESP	Sergio
22	FW	ARG	Mario Turdó
23	MF	FRA	Claude Makélélé
24	MF	ALG	Djamel Belmadi
25	MF	ESP	Jacobo Campos
26	GK	ESP	Roberto
27	MF	ESP	Jonathan Aspas
29	DF	ESP	Iago Bouzón

=== Transfers ===
In
Pos.	Name	from	Type
FW	Benni McCarthy	AFC Ajax	
DF	Juan Velasco	Sevilla CF	
DF	Juanfran	Valencia CF	
DF	Sergio Fernandez	Sporting Gijon	
MF	Everton Giovanella	UD Salamanca	
MF	Gustavo Lopez	Real Zaragoza	
FW	Mario Turdó	CA Independiente	
FW	Ivan Kaviedes	Perugia	
DF	Pablo Coira	SD Compostela	

Out
Pos.	Name	To	Type
FW	Juan Sanchez	Valencia CF	
DF	Michel Salgado	Real Madrid	
DF	Oscar Vales	Athletic Club	loan ended
FW	Lubo Penev		
DF	Josema	Osasuna	
MF	Dan Eggen	Deportivo Alaves	
FW	Vladimir Gudelj	SD Compostela	
MF	Jordi Cruyff	Manchester United	loan ended

==== Winter ====
In
Pos.	Name	from	Type
DF	Nelson Vivas	Arsenal FC	loan
MF	Rick Hoogendorp	RKC Waalwijk	loan
MF	Djamel Belmadi	Cannes	loan

Out
Pos.	Name	To	Type
FW	Iván Kaviedes	Puebla	loan
DF	Adriano Teixeira		released
MF	Zoran Djorovic		released
MF	Bruno Caires	CD Tenerife	loan
MF	Fran Cainzos	UD Salamanca	

=== La Liga ===
==== League table ====
Pos	Team	Pld	W	D	L	GF	GA	GD	Pts	Qualification or relegation
5	Real Madrid	38	16	14	8	58	48	+10	62	Qualification for the Champions League group stage (Note: Real Madrid qualified directly for the 2000–01 UEFA Champions League as holders. As a result, Zaragoza lost their spot in the UEFA Champions League and had to participate in the UEFA Cup.)
6	Alavés	38	17	10	11	41	37	+4	61	Qualification for the UEFA Cup first round
7	Celta Vigo	38	15	8	15	45	43	+2	53 (Note: VLD 3–3 CEL; CEL 1–1 VLD)	Qualification for the Intertoto Cup third round
8	Valladolid	38	14	11	13	36	44	−8	53	
9	Rayo Vallecano	38	15	7	16	51	53	−2	52	Qualification for the UEFA Cup qualifying round (Note: Rayo Vallecano earned a spot in the qualifying round of the 2000–01 UEFA Cup as being elected by UEFA as one of the two best entries of UEFA Fair play.)

Source: LFP
Rules for classification: 1) points; 2) head-to-head points; 3) head-to-head goal difference; 4) head-to-head goals scored; 5) goal difference; 6) number of goals scored.

==== Results by round ====
Round	1	2	3	4	5	6	7	8	9	10	11	12	13	14	15	16	17	18	19	20	21	22	23	24	25	26	27	28	29	30	31	32	33	34	35	36	37	38
Ground	A	H	A	H	A	H	H	A	H	A	H	A	H	A	H	A	H	A	H	H	A	H	A	H	A	A	H	A	H	A	H	A	H	A	H	A	H	A
Result	L	W	W	L	W	W	W	L	W	L	W	W	W	L	D	L	L	D	L	W	W	L	L	W	L	L	W	L	D	D	D	L	D	L	W	W	D	D
Position	14	10	7	10	4	3	3	4	3	5	4	2	2	2	2	2	3	4	7	5	4	5	5	5	6	7	7	7	7	7	7	7	9	12	8	8	7	7

Updated to match(es) played on 2008-07-16. Source: LFP.com
A = Away; H = Home; W = Win; D = Draw; L = Loss; = Leader, 1999–2000 UEFA Champions League Group stage; = 1999–2000 UEFA Champions League Group stage; = 1999–2000 UEFA Champions League Qualifying round; = 1999–2000 UEFA Cup; = 2000 UEFA Intertoto Cup; = 1999–2000 Segunda División

==== Matches ====
21 August 1999 1	Real Oviedo	1–0	Celta	Oviedo
	Danjou 56'			Stadium: Carlos Tartiere

29 August 1999 2	Celta	2–1	Sevilla	Vigo
	McCarthy 23'; Makélélé 73'		75' Tsiartas	Stadium: Balaidos

12 September 1999 3	Atlético Madrid	1–2	Celta	Madrid
	Valerón 37'		Karpin 32' (pen.); Juanfran 86'	Stadium: Vicente Calderon

18 September 1999 4	Celta	0–1	Rayo Vallecano	Vigo
			65' Bolo	Stadium: Balaidos

25 September 1999 5	Real Sociedad	0–2	Celta	San Sebastián
			Mostovoi 66'; Karpin 90'	Stadium: Anoeta

3 October 1999 6	Celta	1–0	Mallorca	Vigo
	Karpin 50'			Stadium: Balaidos

13 October 1999 7	Celta	2–1	Real Zaragoza	Vigo
	Cáceres 36'; Mostovoi 54'		Milošević 28'	Stadium: Balaidos

16 October 1999 8	Racing Santander	3–0	Celta	Santander
	Salva 5, 16, 45'			Stadium: El Sardinero

24 October 1999 9	Celta	2–1	Espanyol	Vigo
	G. López 7'; Juanfran 90'		de Lucas 43'	Stadium: Balaidos

31 October 1999 10	Deportivo Alavés	1–0	Celta	Vitoria-Gasteiz
	Salinas 60'			Stadium: Mendizorroza

7 November 1999 11	Celta	5–1	Real Betis	Vigo
	G. López 18'; Turdó 23, 59'; Mostovoi 27'; Karpin 70'		Alfonso 2'	Stadium: Balaidos

21 November 1999 12	Real Valladolid	1–3	Celta	Valladolid
	Fabri 55'		Đorović 29'; Karpin 81'; McCarthy 86'	Stadium: Jose Zorrilla

28 November 1999 13	Celta	1–0	Real Madrid	Vigo
	Celades 38'			Stadium: Balaidos

5 December 1999 14	Numancia	3–1	Celta Vigo	Soria
	Cáceres 36' (o.g.); Navarro 52'; Viñals 53'		Mostovoi 64'	Stadium: Los Pajaritos

12 December 1999 15	Celta Vigo	1–1	Athletic Bilbao	Vigo
	Turdó 42'		Ezquerro 79'	Stadium: Balaidos

18 December 1999 16	Deportivo	1–0	Celta Vigo	A Coruña
	Turu Flores 65'			Stadium: Riazor

22 December 1999 17	Celta Vigo	2–4	Málaga	Vigo
	Karpin 35' (pen.); Revivo 66'		Catanha 17, 86, 89'; Rufete 56'	Stadium: Balaidos

4 January 2000 18	Valencia	1–1	Celta Vigo	Valencia
	Gerard 6'		Velasco 49'	Stadium: Mestalla

9 January 2000 19	Celta Vigo	0–2	Barcelona	Vigo
			Figo 2'; Rivaldo 90'	Stadium: Balaidos

16 January 2000 20	Celta Vigo	5–3	Real Oviedo	Vigo
	Turdó 1, 27, 47'; Mostovoi 15'; Revivo 38'		Dely Valdés 36, 70'; Bango 37'	Stadium: Balaidos

22 January 2000 21	Sevilla	0–1	Celta Vigo	Seville
			McCarthy 83'	Stadium: Sánchez Pizjuán

29 January 2000 22	Celta Vigo	0–1	Atlético Madrid	Vigo
			Valerón 26'	Stadium: Balaidos

6 February 2000 23	Rayo Vallecano	1–0	Celta Vigo	Madrid
	Ferrón 26'			Stadium: Vallecas

13 February 2000 24	Celta Vigo	4–1	Real Sociedad	Vigo
	Mostovoi 63'; Sergio 65'; G. López 76, 90'		de Paula 22'	Stadium: Balaidos

20 February 2000 25	Mallorca	1–0	Celta Vigo	Palma
	Tristán 90'			Stadium: Son Moix

27 February 2000 26	Real Zaragoza	2–1	Celta Vigo	Zaragoza
	Acuña 52'; Milošević 72'		McCarthy 38'	Stadium: La Romareda

5 March 2000 27	Celta Vigo	2–0	Espanyol	Vigo
	McCarthy 36'; Mostovoi 63'			Stadium: Balaidos

12 March 2000 28	RCD Espanyol	3–0	Celta	Barcelona
	Tamudo 48, 58'; Roger 66' (pen.)			Stadium: Olimpic

19 March 2000 29	Celta Vigo	1–1	Deportivo Alavés	Vigo
	McCarthy 57'		Javi Moreno 65'	Stadium: Balaidos

26 March 2000 30	Real Betis	0–0	Celta Vigo	Seville
				Stadium: Benito Villamarin

2 April 2000 31	Celta	1–1	Real Valladolid	Vigo
	McCarthy 37'		78' Caminero	Stadium: Balaidos

9 March 2000 32	Real Madrid	1–0	Celta	Madrid
	Raúl 68'			Stadium: Santiago Bernabeu

16 April 2000 33	Celta Vigo	0–0	Numancia	Vigo
				Stadium: Balaidos

22 April 2000 34	Athletic Bilbao	1–0	Celta	Bilbao
	Urzaiz 86'			Stadium: San Mamés

30 April 2000 35	Celta	2–1	Deportivo La Coruña	Vigo
	McCarthy 4'; G. López 75'		46' Turu Flores	Stadium: Balaidos

7 May 2000 36	Málaga	0–1	Celta Vigo	Málaga
			16' G. López	Stadium: La Rosaleda

14 May 2000 37	Celta Vigo	0–0	Valencia	Vigo
				Stadium: Balaidos

19 May 2000 38	Barcelona	2–2	Celta Vigo	Barcelona
	Kluivert 47' (pen.), 53'		29' Tomás; 35' Turdó	Stadium: Camp Nou

=== Copa del Rey ===
==== Eightfinals ====
20 January 2000	RCD Espanyol	2-1	Celta Vigo	Barcelona

3 February 2000	RC Celta	0-1	RCD Espanyol	Vigo
				Stadium: Balaídos

=== UEFA Cup ===
==== 1st Round ====
16 September 1999	Lausanne (Switzerland)	3–2	(Spain) Celta Vigo
	Kuzba 20'; Mazzoni 21, 57'		62' Revivo; 66' Karpin

30 September 1999	Celta Vigo (Spain)	4–0	(Switzerland) Lausanne
	McCarthy 11, 84, 92'; Mostovoi 76'

==== 2nd round ====
19 October 1999	Aris (Greece)	2–2	(Spain) Celta Vigo
	Andrioli 44'; Kizeridis 68'		Karpin 41, 42'

4 November 1999	Celta Vigo (Spain)	2–0	(Greece) Aris
	Djorovic 67'; Turdó 91'

=== Round of 32 ===
25 November 1999	Celta Vigo (Spain)	7–0	(Portugal) Benfica
	Karpin 16' (pen.), 54'; Makélélé 30'; Turdó 39, 50'; Juanfran 42'; Mostovoi 61'

9 December 1999	Benfica (Portugal)	1–1	(Spain) Celta Vigo
	Cáceres 79' (o.g.)		19' McCarthy

==== Eightfinals ====
2 March 2000	Juventus (Italy)	1–0	(Spain) Celta Vigo	Turin
	Kovačević 52'			Stadium: Stadio delle Alpi

9 March 2000	Celta Vigo (Spain)	4–0	(Italy) Juventus	Vigo
	Makélélé 1'; Birindelli 32' (o.g.); McCarthy 47, 69'			Stadium: Balaidos

==== Quarter-finals ====
16 March 2000	Celta Vigo (Spain)	0–0	(France) Lens	Vigo
				Stadium: Balaidos

23 March 2000	Lens (France)	2–1	(Spain) Celta Vigo	Lens
	Ismaël 62' (pen.); Nouma 72'		56' Revivo

== Statistics ==
=== Players statistics ===
No.	Pos	Nat	Player	Total		La Liga		Copa del Rey		UEFA Cup	
No.	Pos	Nat	Player	Apps	Goals	Apps	Goals	Apps	Goals	Apps	Goals
1	GK	(France) FRA	Dutruel	24	-31	19	-26	0	0	5	-5
2	DF	(Spain) ESP	Velasco	38	1	28+1	1	1+1	0	6+1	0
4	DF	(Argentina) ARG	Caceres	46	1	35	1	1	0	10	0
21	DF	(Spain) ESP	Sergio	38	1	25+2	1	4	0	5+2	0
14	DF	(Spain) ESP	Juanfran	39	3	27	2	2	0	10	1
8	MF	(Russia) RUS	Karpin	46	11	33+1	6	2	0	10	5
23	MF	(France) FRA	Makelele	44	3	33+1	1	1	0	9	2
5	MF	(Brazil) BRA	Giovanella	43	0	28+6	0	2	0	6+1	0
10	MF	(Russia) RUS	Mostovoi	34	8	22+4	6	1	0	5+2	2
11	MF	(Argentina) ARG	López	45	7	27+5	6	4	1	7+2	0
17	FW	(South Africa) RSA	McCarthy	45	16	25+6	8	2+2	2	9+1	6
13	GK	(Spain) ESP	Pinto	28	-26	19	-17	4	-5	5	-4
9	FW	(Israel) ISR	Revivo	39	5	18+9	2	3+1	1	7+1	2
19	DF	(Federal Republic of Yugoslavia) YUG	Djorovic	32	4	23	1	4	2	5	1
16	MF	(Spain) ESP	Celades	34	1	19+5	1	3	0	6+1	0
22	FW	(Argentina) ARG	Turdo	29	10	12+13	7	1+1	0	1+1	3
7	MF	(Spain) ESP	Tomás	31	1	5+16	1	2+1	0	2+5	0
20	DF	(Argentina) ARG	Vivas	15	0	9+4	0	1+1	0		
18	DF	(Spain) ESP	Coira	12	0	3+4	0	3	0	1+1	0
24	MF	(Algeria) ALG	Belmadi	10	0	3+7	0				
12	FW	(Netherlands) NED	Hoogendorp	10	0	3+4	0	1	0	0+2	0
6	MF	(Brazil) BRA	Mazinho	10	0	1+5	0	2	0	1+1	0
12	FW	(Ecuador) ECU	Kaviedes	7	0	0+5	0	0	0	0+2	0
15	DF	(Brazil) BRA	Adriano	4	0	1+1	0	0+1	0	0+1	0
28	FW	(Spain) ESP	Mena	3	0	0+3	0				
24	MF	(Portugal) POR	Caires	2	0	0+2	0				
29	DF	(Spain) ESP	Bouzon	2	0	0+2	0				
27	MF	(Spain) ESP	Aspas	2	0	0	0	0+1	0	0+1	0
3	DF	(Spain) ESP	Berges								
14	DF	(Spain) ESP	Juanfran								
25	MF	(Spain) ESP	Campos								
26	GK	(Spain) ESP	Roberto								

- Source: https://www.bdfutbol.com/en/t/t1999-0011.html?tab=partits

== Sources ==
- FootballSquads - Celta Vigo 1999/2000
- RSSSF - Spain 1999/2000 (Top Three Levels)
