= Adrián Cruz =

Spanish footballer

Personal information
- Full name: Adrián Cruz Juncal
- Date of birth: 18 July 1987 (age 39)
- Place of birth: Moaña, Spain
- Height: 1.80 m (5 ft 11 in)
- Position: Midfielder

Team information
- Current team: Alondras

Youth career
- Alondras

Senior career*
Years	Team	Apps	(Gls)
2006–2007	Alondras		
2007–2009	Pontevedra B	51	(8)
2009–2011	Pontevedra	42	(2)
2010	→ Poli Ejido (loan)	14	(0)
2011–2012	Montañeros	27	(2)
2012–2013	Marino	29	(6)
2013–2014	Ourense	24	(1)
2014–2015	Racing Ferrol	28	(4)
2015–2016	Osasuna	3	(0)
2016	→ Logroñés (loan)	10	(0)
2016–2017	Murcia	23	(0)
2017–2019	Burgos	56	(2)
2019–2020	Guijuelo	15	(0)
2020–2021	Pontevedra	16	(0)
2021–2025	Arenteiro	69	(3)
2025–	Alondras	0	(0)
- * Club domestic league appearances and goals as of 10 June 2025

Adrián Cruz Juncal (born 18 July 1987) is a Spanish professional footballer who plays for Alondras as a midfielder.

== Football career ==
Born in Moaña, Pontevedra, Galicia, Cruz finished his formation with Alondras CF, making his senior debuts in 2006, in Tercera División. In the 2007 summer he moved to Pontevedra CF, being assigned to the reserves also in the fourth level.

Cruz was promoted to the latter's main squad in Segunda División B in 2009, but on 2 February 2010 was loaned to fellow league team Polideportivo Ejido, until June. After one season as a starter (which ended in relegation), he moved to Montañeros CF also in the third division.

On 28 July 2012 Cruz signed for CD Guijuelo, but on 25 August moved to Club Marino de Luanco, due to the former's poor financial situation. On 20 June of the following year he joined CD Ourense, after scoring six goals for Marino.

On 3 July 2014 Cruz moved to Racing de Ferrol, still in the third tier. On 26 June of the following year, after appearing regularly with the Diaños Verdes, he signed a one-year deal with CA Osasuna in Segunda División.

Cruz made his professional debut on 22 August 2015, coming on as a second-half substitute for Oier Sanjurjo in a 2–0 away win against UE Llagostera. On 1 February of the following year, he was loaned to UD Logroñés until June.

On 1 July 2016 Cruz signed a one-year contract with Real Murcia in the third level, after rescinding with the Navarrese outfit.

== Personal life ==
Cruz is the cousin of the Spanish footballers Raúl Blanco, Jonathan and Iago Aspas. In December 2012 Cruz was arrested after assaulting a police officer, but was released a day later.
