= Raúl Blanco (footballer, born 2001) =

Spanish footballer (born 2001)

Personal information
- Full name: Raúl Blanco Juncal
- Date of birth: 31 July 2001 (age 25)
- Place of birth: Moaña, Spain
- Height: 1.73 m (5 ft 8 in)
- Position: Attacking midfielder

Team information
- Current team: Alcorcón (on loan from Casa Pia)
- Number: 22

Youth career
- 2009–2020: Celta

Senior career*
| Years | Team | Apps | (Gls) |
| 2020–2024 | Celta B | 83 | (17) |
| 2021–2022 | → Arenteiro (loan) | 30 | (3) |
| 2024– | Casa Pia | 5 | (1) |
| 2025 | → Racing Ferrol (loan) | 14 | (0) |
| 2025– | → Alcorcón (loan) | 30 | (2) |
- * Club domestic league appearances and goals as of 10 June 2026

Raúl Blanco Juncal (born 31 July 2001) is a Spanish footballer who plays as an attacking midfielder for Spanish Primera Federación club Alcorcón on loan from Portuguese club Casa Pia.

== Club career ==
Blanco joined the youth academy of RC Celta de Vigo at the age of eight, and worked his way up their youth categories. In December 2020, he was promoted to the reserves in the Primera Federación.

On 26 August 2021, Blanco joined Segunda Federación side CD Arenteiro on loan for the season. He returned to Celta Fortuna for the 2022–23 season, being given the number 10 shirt and named captain. On 12 June 2023, he extended his contract with Celta until 2027. In March 2024, he started training with the senior Celta Vigo squad.

On 4 July 2024, Blanco transferred to the Portuguese Primeira Liga club Casa Pia AC. He made his professional debut on 10 August, in a 1–0 home loss to Boavista FC.

On 9 January 2025, after being rarely used, Blanco returned to his home country after agreeing to a six-month loan spell with Racing de Ferrol in Segunda División.

== Personal life ==
Blanco is the cousin of the Spanish footballers Adrián Cruz, Jonathan and Iago Aspas.
