= Iago Aspas =

Spanish footballer (born 1987)

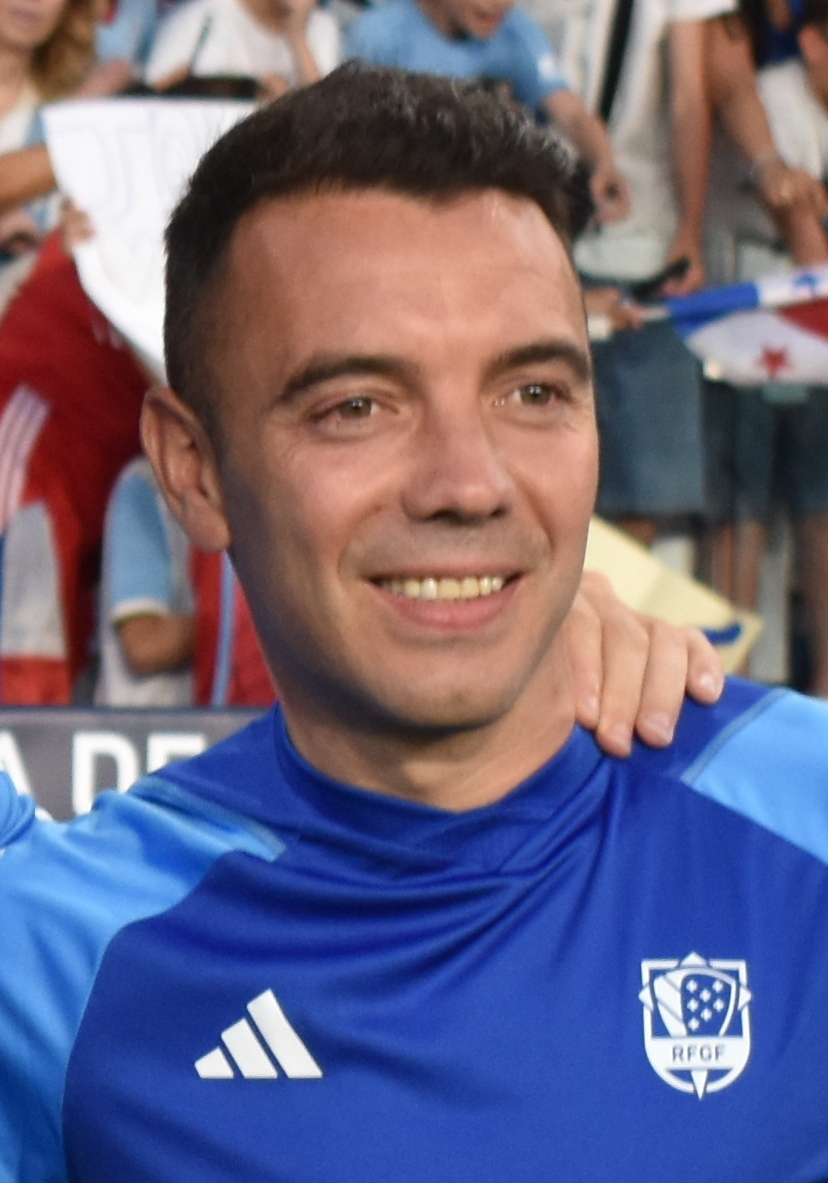
- Aspas with Galicia in 2024

Personal information
- Full name: Iago Aspas Juncal
- Date of birth: 1 August 1987 (age 39)
- Place of birth: Moaña, Spain
- Height: 1.76 m (5 ft 9 in)
- Position: Striker

Team information
- Current team: Celta
- Number: 10

Youth career
- Moaña
- Santa Mariña
- 1995–2006: Celta
- 2004–2005: → Rápido Bouzas (loan)

Senior career*
| Years | Team | Apps | (Gls) |
| 2006–2009 | Celta B | 84 | (11) |
| 2008–2013 | Celta | 137 | (46) |
| 2013–2015 | Liverpool | 14 | (0) |
| 2014–2015 | → Sevilla (loan) | 16 | (2) |
| 2015– | Celta | 379 | (157) |

International career
| 2016–2023 | Spain | 20 | (6) |
| 2016–2024 | Galicia | 2 | (1) |
- * Club domestic league appearances and goals as of 19:26, 8 November 2026 (UTC)

Iago Aspas Juncal (Galician pronunciation: [iˈaɣʊ ˈaspɐs]; born 1 August 1987) is a Spanish professional footballer who plays as a striker for and captains La Liga club Celta de Vigo.

He has spent most of his career with Celta, appearing in 572 official games across 17 seasons and scoring 222 goals. He made his La Liga debut with the club in 2012 and moved to Liverpool the following year, returning to Celta in 2015 after a loan at Sevilla.

Aspas first appeared with the Spain senior team in 2016. He represented the country at the 2018 World Cup.

== Club career ==
=== Celta ===
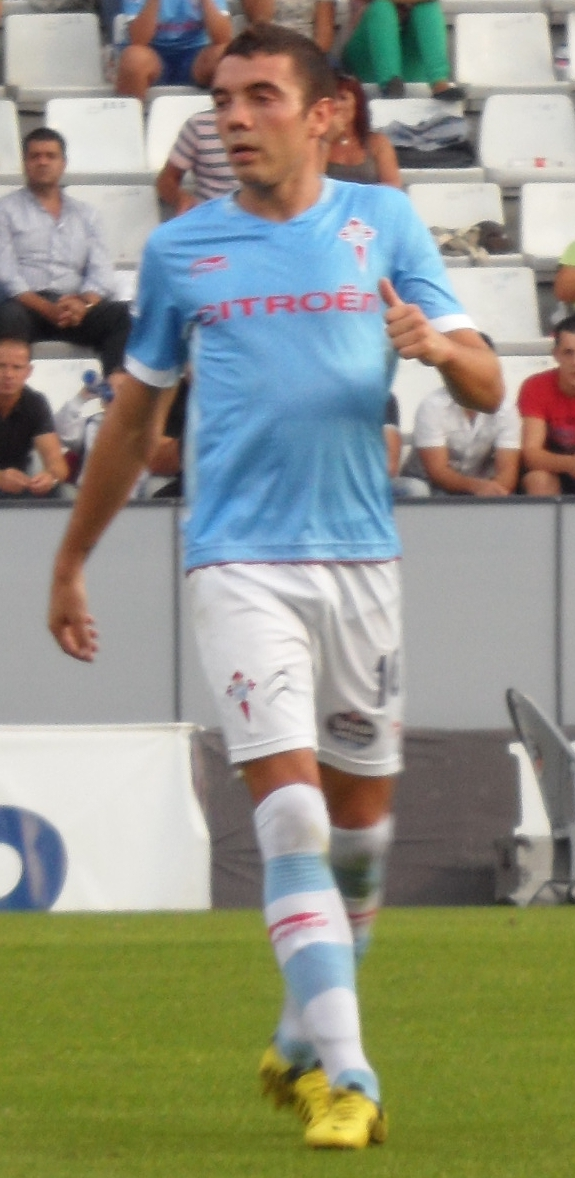
Aspas playing for Celta in 2012

Aspas was born in Moaña, Province of Pontevedra. Brought through the youth ranks of local club Celta de Vigo, he made his first-team debut in the 2007–08 season with the side in Segunda División, then played his second game on 6 June 2009: brought on as a 59th-minute substitute against Alavés, he scored both of his team's goals in a 2–1 home win, being essential as they eventually escaped relegation. When he was 17, he was loaned to neighbouring Rápido de Bouzas, where he spent his penultimate year as a junior.

Aspas was definitively promoted from the reserves for 2009–10, going on to appear in several more campaigns in the second tier with the Galicians. In the 2011–12 season, he scored a career-best 23 league goals, second-best in the competition behind Almería's Leonardo Ulloa as Celta returned to La Liga after a five-year absence; as a result of his performances, he was voted best forward and Zarra Trophy winner for the division.

Aspas made his top flight debut on 18 August 2012, starting in a 1–0 home loss against Málaga. He scored his first goal in the competition the following month, contributing to a 2–0 win over Osasuna also at Balaídos Stadium, and added a further 11 during the campaign to help the side escape relegation in the final matchday.

On 15 March 2013, during the 3–1 Galician derby away loss to Deportivo de La Coruña, Aspas was sent off after half an hour for headbutting Carlos Marchena.

=== Liverpool ===
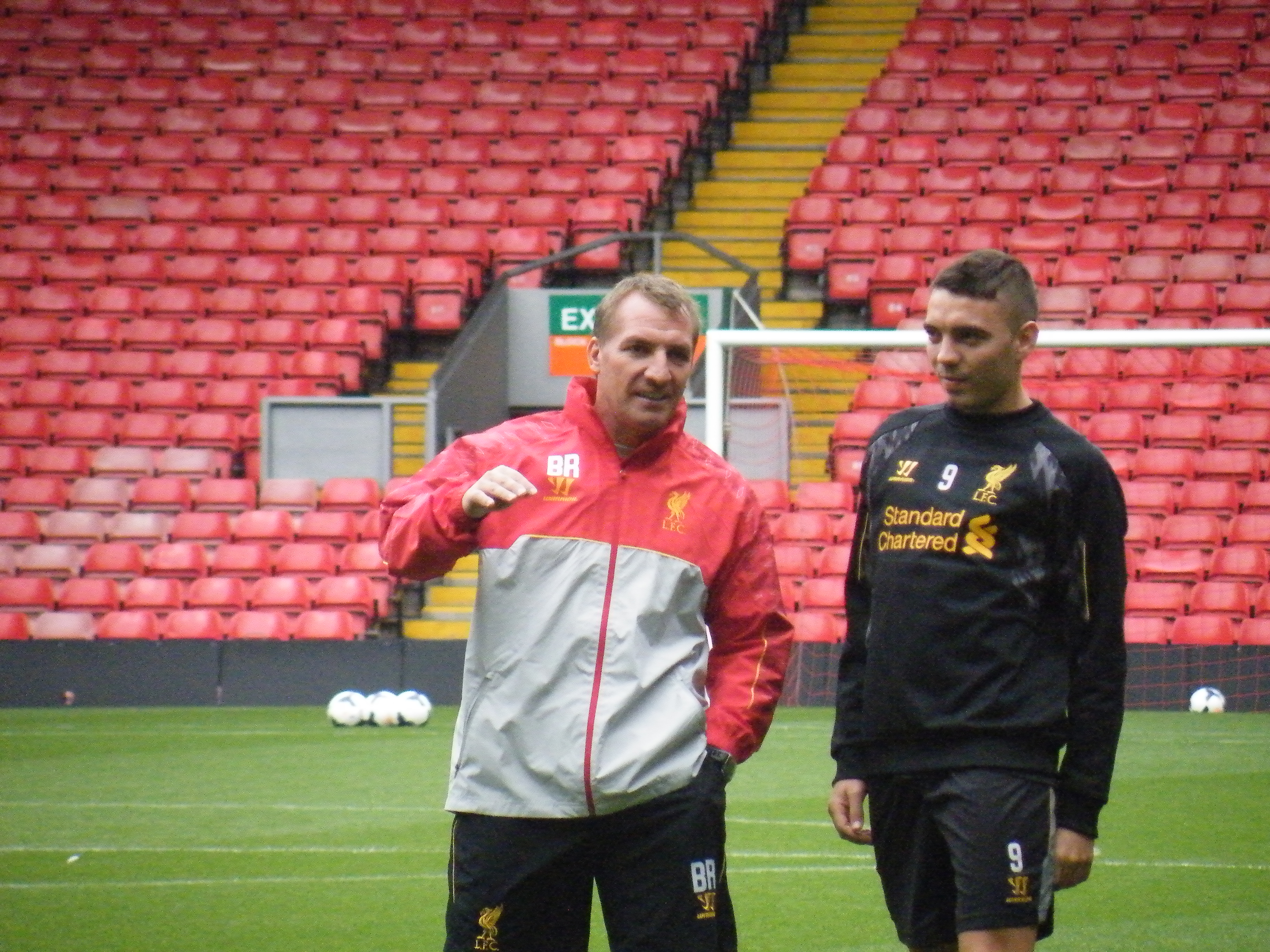
Liverpool manager Brendan Rodgers instructing Aspas in August 2013

In May 2013, it was widely rumoured that a fee estimated between £7–9 million had been agreed for Aspas to join Liverpool, pending personal terms and a medical. On 13 June, both clubs agreed to a deal in principle to sign the player subject to completion of documentation, but this was delayed when his former agent requested the Royal Spanish Football Federation withhold international clearance because of a dispute over his representation; the deal was finally completed on 23 June, and he was given the number 9 shirt.

Aspas made his Liverpool debut on 13 July 2013, scoring his first goal as well as assisting Raheem Sterling in a 4–0 pre-season friendly win against Preston North End. He made his Premier League debut on 17 August, providing an assist for Daniel Sturridge in a 1–0 victory over Stoke City at Anfield.

Aspas scored his only competitive goal for the Reds on 5 January 2014, in a 2–0 win over Oldham Athletic in the FA Cup. During his spell, he played second-fiddle to Philippe Coutinho, Sterling, Sturridge and Luis Suárez as the Reds went on to finish second; he also struggled with his limited knowledge of the English language.

=== Sevilla ===
On 14 July 2014, Aspas returned to his homeland, being loaned to Sevilla in a season-long move and with a permanent three-year deal as a subsequent obligatory option. He made his competitive debut on 12 August in the 2014 UEFA Super Cup at the Cardiff City Stadium, replacing fellow debutant Aleix Vidal after 66 minutes of an eventual 2–0 defeat to Real Madrid.

On 14 September 2014, Aspas appeared in the league for the first time, coming on for Carlos Bacca for the final seven minutes of a 2–0 home win against Getafe. His first goal for his new club came on 2 October, as he opened the score in a 2–2 draw at Rijeka in the group stage of the UEFA Europa League. Later that month, he played the full 90 minutes and grabbed a hat-trick against Sabadell, helping to a 6–1 away rout in the round of 32 of the Copa del Rey, adding another treble within a four-minute spell in the second leg for a 5–1 win; he and Barcelona's Neymar were the tournament's top scorers with seven goals each.

Aspas' first league goal for Sevilla came on 1 February 2015, the winner in a 3–2 victory over Espanyol. Earlier in the game, he had taken a shot which was handled by Kiko Casilla outside of the penalty area, resulting in the goalkeeper's dismissal.

=== Return to Celta ===
On 12 June 2015, Sevilla signed Aspas from Liverpool as part of the agreement between the two clubs, then sold him straight back to Celta on the same day, with the player agreeing to a five-year contract six days later for a €5 million fee. On 23 September, he scored twice in a 4–1 home win over Barcelona.

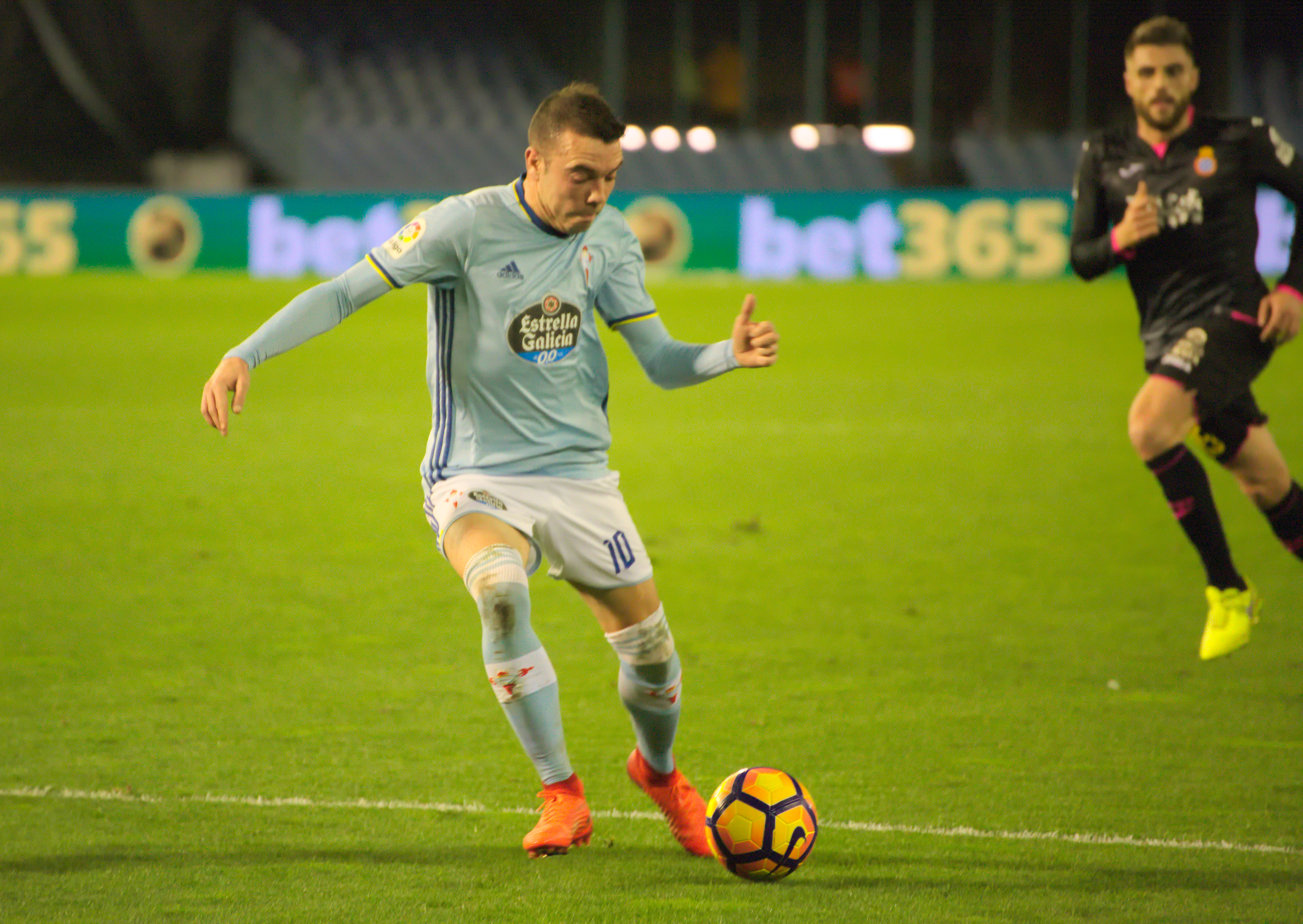
Aspas in action for Celta in 2017

Aspas was the La Liga Player of the Month for October 2016 after scoring five goals, including braces in a 4–1 win against Deportivo and a 3–3 draw with Las Palmas, in addition to a goal and assist in a 4–3 victory over reigning champions Barcelona. The following 23 February, he scored a last-minute penalty in the Europa League last-32 second leg to force extra time at Shakhtar Donetsk, with the Spaniards emerging victorious.

On 21 May 2017, in the last matchday of the campaign, Aspas scored through a penalty in a 2–2 home draw against Real Sociedad, reaching a personal-best 19 goals and winning the Zarra Trophy in the process. The following season, he was again the league's top-scoring Spaniard at 22 behind only Lionel Messi, Cristiano Ronaldo and Luis Suárez overall. He netted hat-tricks in a 5–2 win at Las Palmas on 16 October 2017 and a 4–0 defeat of former side Sevilla the following 7 April, in addition to a brace in a 3–1 derby victory at eventually relegated Deportivo; on 5 November 2017, with another couple in a 3–1 home defeat of Athletic Bilbao, he reached 100 goals for his main employer, putting himself sixth in their all-time scorers.

In 2018–19, Aspas was absent with a calf injury for three months from the end of December, during which Celta slipped from ninth place to 18th in the table. He netted twice in a 3–2 win over Villarreal on his return on 30 March 2019 in what was also his 300th game for the team, and on 17 April he signed a new contract to last until 2023, the club's centenary year.

On 24 June 2020, Aspas scored the only goal at Real Sociedad to reach 100 La Liga goals from 209 games; only four players since the Spanish Civil War had done so quicker. Three days later he reached 150 for Celta in his 339th overall match, a 2–2 home draw with Barcelona. On 30 June, he achieved a century of top-flight goals for the club in a 5–1 away loss against Mallorca.

Aspas netted in a 3–1 home defeat to Real Sociedad on 1 November 2020 with his 105th goal for the team in the top division, taking a 69-year record from Hermidita. He was again voted the best in the league for December, contributing to eight of Celta's 11 goals as they went unbeaten in five games. At the end of the season, he had managed to score at least 14 times for the sixth consecutive year; according to different sources, his 160th goal either equalled Nolete as second highest, or surpassed founding member Ramón Polo as the club's highest scorer of all time.

On 6 November 2021, Aspas scored a brace to help his side come back from 3–0 down to salvage a 3–3 draw against Barcelona, including a goal in the sixth minute of added time. He totalled 17 for the campaign to again become top national scorer, in an 11th-place finish.

Aspas made headlines in November 2023, after throwing the pitchside VAR monitor to the ground in frustration following the decision to deny Celta a penalty in the closing moments of a 1–1 draw with Sevilla. He scored his 200th competitive goal the following 17 February, but in a 2–1 home loss to Barcelona.

On 25 December 2024, Aspas agreed to an extension until 2026. On 24 May 2025, he recorded a goal and an assist in a 2–1 victory over Getafe on the final day of the campaign, securing qualification for the Europa League for the first time in eight years.

On 5 October 2025, Aspas equalised a 1–1 home draw against Atlético Madrid to tie Manolo's record of club appearances at 533. He became the all-time leader 18 days later, celebrating the milestone by opening an eventual 2–1 defeat of Nice in the Europa League league phase with his 217th goal.

== International career ==
=== Spain ===
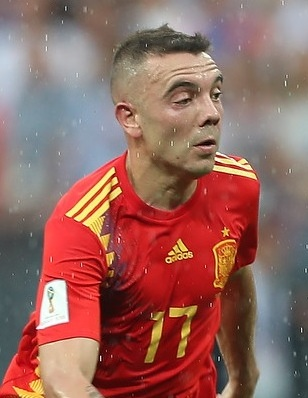
Aspas at the 2018 FIFA World Cup

In December 2012 Aspas, along with Michu, was poised to be called up by manager Vicente del Bosque for a debut with the Spain national team on 6 February 2013, in an exhibition game with Uruguay in Doha, Qatar. However, neither made the final squad for that match.

Aspas finally earned his first cap on 15 November 2016, under new coach Julen Lopetegui, replacing Juan Mata for the second half of the 2–2 friendly draw against England, being booked and scoring his side's first goal. His competitive debut came on 24 March of the following year, as he played the last six minutes of the 4–1 home win over Israel for the 2018 FIFA World Cup qualifiers.

Aspas was included in the 23-man squad for the World Cup finals in Russia. He made his debut in the competition on 15 June 2018, replacing Diego Costa, who had scored twice, for the final 14 minutes of the 3–3 group-stage draw against Portugal. Ten days later, having come on for the same player, he scored a last-minute equaliser with a backheel to help his team draw 2–2 against Morocco and reach the knockout phase as group champions.

On 1 July 2018, again after having taken the place of Costa, Aspas was one of two Spanish players to miss his attempt in the 4–3 penalty shootout round-of-16 loss to Russia in Moscow. In March 2023, after nearly four years without an appearance, the 35-year-old was called by newly-appointed coach Luis de la Fuente for UEFA Euro 2024 qualifying matches against Norway and Scotland.

=== Galicia ===
Aspas represented Galicia in the region's first match for eight years, scoring in a 1–1 friendly draw with Venezuela on 20 May 2016.

== Personal life ==
Aspas' older brother, Jonathan, was also a footballer; he too came through Celta's youth system. Their cousins Aitor Aspas, Raúl Blanco and Adrián Cruz were also involved in the sport.

Aspas has three children with his wife Jennifer Rueda, whom he married in June 2019.

== Career statistics ==
=== Club ===
As of match played 8 November 2026

Appearances and goals by club, season and competition
| Club | Season | League | | | National cup (Note: Includes Copa del Rey, FA Cup) | | Europe | | Other | | Total | |
| Club | Season | Division | Apps | Goals | Apps | Goals | Apps | Goals | Apps | Goals | Apps | Goals |
|---|---|---|---|---|---|---|---|---|---|---|---|---|
| Celta B | 2006–07 | Segunda División B | 21 | 1 | — | | — | | — | | 21 | 1 |
| Celta B | 2007–08 | Segunda División B | 32 | 4 | — | | — | | — | | 32 | 4 |
| Celta B | 2008–09 | Segunda División B | 31 | 6 | — | | — | | — | | 31 | 6 |
| Celta B | Total | | 84 | 11 | — | | — | | — | | 84 | 11 |
| Celta | 2007–08 | Segunda División | 1 | 0 | 0 | 0 | — | | — | | 1 | 0 |
| Celta | 2008–09 | Segunda División | 3 | 2 | 0 | 0 | — | | — | | 3 | 2 |
| Celta | 2009–10 | Segunda División | 36 | 5 | 7 | 1 | — | | — | | 43 | 6 |
| Celta | 2010–11 | Segunda División | 28 | 4 | 1 | 1 | — | | 2 (Note: Appearances in La Liga play-offs) | 0 | 31 | 5 |
| Celta | 2011–12 | Segunda División | 35 | 23 | 3 | 2 | — | | — | | 38 | 25 |
| Celta | 2012–13 | La Liga | 34 | 12 | 3 | 0 | — | | — | | 37 | 12 |
| Celta | Total | | 137 | 46 | 14 | 4 | — | | 2 | 0 | 153 | 50 |
| Liverpool | 2013–14 | Premier League | 14 | 0 | 1 | 1 | — | | — | | 15 | 1 |
| Sevilla (loan) | 2014–15 | La Liga | 16 | 2 | 5 | 7 | 3 (Note: Appearances in UEFA Europa League) | 1 | 1 (Note: Appearance in UEFA Super Cup) | 0 | 25 | 10 |
| Celta | 2015–16 | La Liga | 35 | 14 | 5 | 4 | — | | — | | 40 | 18 |
| Celta | 2016–17 | La Liga | 32 | 19 | 5 | 2 | 12 | 5 | — | | 49 | 26 |
| Celta | 2017–18 | La Liga | 34 | 22 | 3 | 1 | — | | — | | 37 | 23 |
| Celta | 2018–19 | La Liga | 27 | 20 | 2 | 1 | — | | — | | 29 | 21 |
| Celta | 2019–20 | La Liga | 37 | 14 | 1 | 0 | — | | — | | 38 | 14 |
| Celta | 2020–21 | La Liga | 33 | 14 | 1 | 0 | — | | — | | 34 | 14 |
| Celta | 2021–22 | La Liga | 37 | 17 | 1 | 0 | — | | — | | 38 | 17 |
| Celta | 2022–23 | La Liga | 37 | 12 | 2 | 0 | — | | — | | 39 | 12 |
| Celta | 2023–24 | La Liga | 35 | 9 | 1 | 0 | — | | — | | 36 | 9 |
| Celta | 2024–25 | La Liga | 30 | 10 | 1 | 0 | — | | — | | 31 | 10 |
| Celta | 2025–26 | La Liga | 32 | 5 | 2 | 0 | 14 | 3 | — | | 48 | 8 |
| Celta | 2026–27 | La Liga | 10 | 1 | 0 | 0 | 3 | 0 | — | | 13 | 1 |
| Celta | Total | | 379 | 157 | 24 | 8 | 29 | 8 | 0 | 0 | 432 | 173 |
| Career total | | | 630 | 216 | 44 | 20 | 32 | 9 | 3 | 0 | 709 | 245 |

=== International ===
Appearances and goals by national team and year
| National team | Year | Apps | Goals |
|---|---|---|---|
| Spain | 2016 | 1 | 1 |
| Spain | 2017 | 6 | 2 |
| Spain | 2018 | 10 | 3 |
| Spain | 2019 | 1 | 0 |
| Spain | 2020 | 0 | 0 |
| Spain | 2021 | 0 | 0 |
| Spain | 2022 | 0 | 0 |
| Spain | 2023 | 2 | 0 |
| Total | | 20 | 6 |

Scores and results list Spain's goal tally first, score column indicates score after each Aspas goal.

List of international goals scored by Iago Aspas
| No. | Date | Venue | Opponent | Score | Result | Competition |
|---|---|---|---|---|---|---|
| 1 | 15 November 2016 | Wembley Stadium, London, England | England | 1–2 | 2–2 | Friendly |
| 2 | 5 September 2017 | Rheinpark Stadion, Vaduz, Liechtenstein | Liechtenstein | 5–0 | 8–0 | 2018 FIFA World Cup qualification |
| 3 | 5 September 2017 | Rheinpark Stadion, Vaduz, Liechtenstein | Liechtenstein | 7–0 | 8–0 | 2018 FIFA World Cup qualification |
| 4 | 27 March 2018 | Metropolitano Stadium, Madrid, Spain | Argentina | 5–1 | 6–1 | Friendly |
| 5 | 9 June 2018 | Krasnodar Stadium, Krasnodar, Russia | Tunisia | 1–0 | 1–0 | Friendly |
| 6 | 25 June 2018 | Kaliningrad Stadium, Kaliningrad, Russia | Morocco | 2–2 | 2–2 | 2018 FIFA World Cup |

== Honours ==
Sevilla

- UEFA Europa League: 2014–15

Individual

- Zarra Trophy: 2016–17, 2017–18, 2018–19, 2021–22
- Zarra Trophy (Segunda División): 2011–12
- Best Forward (Segunda División): 2011–12
- La Liga Team of the Season: 2024–25
- La Liga Player of the Month: October 2016, November 2017, April 2019, December 2020
- UEFA La Liga Team of The Season: 2017–18, 2018–19

== See also ==
- List of footballers with 400 or more La Liga appearances
