= Mido (footballer) =

Egyptian football manager (born 1983)

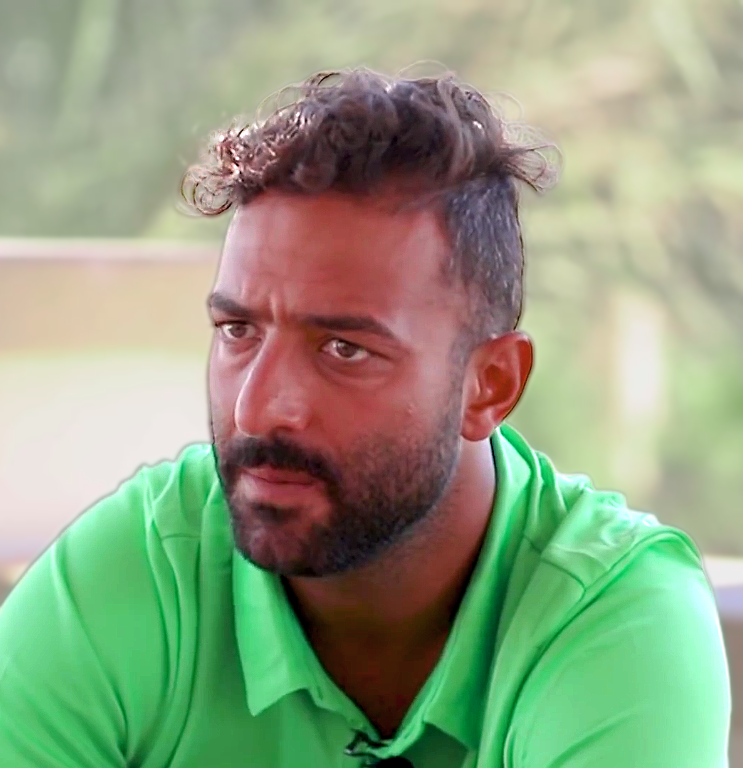
- Mido in 2019

Personal information
- Full name: Ahmed Hossam Hussein Abdel Hamid Wasfi
- Date of birth: 23 February 1983 (age 43)
- Place of birth: Cairo, Egypt
- Height: 1.88 m (6 ft 2 in)
- Position: Striker

Youth career
- 1990–1999: Zamalek

Senior career*
Years	Team	Apps	(Gls)
1999–2000	Zamalek	4	(3)
2000–2001	Gent	23	(11)
2001–2003	Ajax	40	(21)
2003	→ Celta Vigo (loan)	8	(4)
2003–2004	Marseille	22	(7)
2004–2006	Roma	8	(0)
2005–2006	→ Tottenham Hotspur (loan)	36	(13)
2006–2007	Tottenham Hotspur	12	(1)
2007–2010	Middlesbrough	25	(6)
2009	→ Wigan Athletic (loan)	12	(2)
2009–2010	→ Zamalek (loan)	11	(1)
2010	→ West Ham United (loan)	9	(0)
2010–2011	Ajax	5	(2)
2011–2012	Zamalek	3	(2)
2012–2013	Barnsley	1	(0)
Total		219	(73)

International career
1999–2001	Egypt U20	13	(1)
2001–2009	Egypt	51	(19)

Managerial career
- 2014: Zamalek
- 2015: Ismaily
- 2016: Zamalek
- 2016–2017: Wadi Degla
- 2018–2019: Al Wehda
- 2019–2020: Misr Lel Makkasa
- 2022–2023: Ismaily
Medal record
Men's football
Representing Egypt
Africa Cup of Nations
Winner	2006
African Youth Championship
Third place	2001
- * Club domestic league appearances and goals

Ahmed Hossam Hussein Abdel Hamid Wasfi (Note: Arabic: أحمد حسام حسين عبد الحميد وصفي) (born 23 February 1983), publicly known as Mido, (Note: Arabic: ميدو) is an Egyptian football manager and former player who played as a striker.

Mido started his career with Zamalek in Egypt in 1999. He left the club for Gent of Belgium in 2000, where he won the Belgian Ebony Shoe. This led to a move to Dutch side Ajax in 2001, from where he joined Celta Vigo on loan in 2003. His next destination was Marseille in France and he left them for Italian side Roma in 2004. He joined English side Tottenham Hotspur on an 18-month loan in 2005 and eventually joined the club permanently in 2006. He left the club in 2007 to join Middlesbrough, from whom he joined Wigan Athletic, Zamalek, West Ham United and Ajax on loan. In 2011, he rejoined Zamalek, before joining Barnsley in 2012. He also played for Egypt 51 times, scoring 19 goals. Mido retired from football in June 2013.

== Club career ==
=== Zamalek ===
Mido started his career with Egyptian Premier League club Zamalek in 1999. He made his league debut on 22 May 2000 in a 0–0 draw against El Qanah. The next week, Mido scored his first two goals against Aluminium Nag Hammâdi, which Zamalek won 3–2. His African debut came on 28 May 2000, in a 2–1 win against Ethiopian Coffee, making the aggregate score 3–3, which led to the game being decided on penalties. Zamalek won 4–2. Zamalek eventually reached the 2000 African Cup Winners' Cup final, beating Cameroonian side Canon Yaoundé 4–3 on aggregate. Mido's performances eventually attracted interest from Belgian club Gent.

=== Gent ===
In 2000, at the age of 17, Mido signed for Gent. Initially, he suffered from homesickness, and returned to Egypt shortly after arriving in Belgium, only staying at his father's vehement insistence. Working hard to fight his reservations, Mido eventually overcame them, in his own words gaining "the mentality of a pro". Gent manager Patrick Remy was impressed by Mido's handling of the issue and promoted him to the first team in September 2000, placing him at first on the substitutes' bench. However, Mido continued to impress Remy, who commented on his "responsibilities ... [and] great technical capabilities". He eventually became a first-team regular, and made his league debut on 27 August 2000 in a 4–1 away win against Eendracht Aalst. On 2 October 2000, he scored his first goal in a 2–1 home win against Standard Liège. His European debut came on 12 September 2000, where Gent suffered a 6–0 home defeat to Ajax. He became a fan favourite, and was praised by the Belgian press at the end of the season. Mido went on to win the Belgian Ebony Shoe in 2001 as the best African player in the Belgian First Division, as well as being named the Belgian "Discovery of the Year". As he attracted interest from major clubs both in Belgium and abroad, he ended the season with a powerful performance against Royal Antwerp, scoring one of Gent's goals in a 3–1 win and setting up the other two. Two years later, Remy described the match to an Egyptian journalist, saying that "Mido did everything." He finished the season with 11 goals from 21 matches, as Gent finished fifth, earning them a spot in the following season of the UEFA Intertoto Cup.

=== Ajax ===
After his success in Belgium with Gent, Mido signed a five-year contract with Eredivisie team Ajax in 2001. He suffered a concussion during their UEFA Cup match with Limassol, after colliding with a defender. He made his return for the team against Heerenveen, a match which Ajax lost 5–1. However, he was sent off against Twente, after kicking Spira Grujić whilst trying to beat him to the ball, for which he was later given a three-match ban. He returned for Ajax against Vitesse, coming on as a substitute in the 75th minute. He failed to be selected for the substitutes bench against Feyenoord in March 2002, which was due to a minor clash with manager Ronald Koeman, and Mido left for a short vacation in Cairo. Mido scored in Ajax's victory over Utrecht in the KNVB Cup final, meaning he ended the 2001–02 season with the Dutch League and Cup double.

He played for only 32 minutes against Groningen, in a display which lacked creativity. He said afterwards he was tired and was carrying a slight injury during the match, but Koeman criticised Mido saying he was not giving everything. He revealed in September 2002 that he wanted to leave Ajax in the transfer window in late December. However, Mido soon apologised to Koeman and Leo Beenhakker regarding the transfer comments, saying the comment was "irresponsible" and "unthoughtful". He was handed a fine and suspended from Ajax's game against Lyon. In December of that year, he revealed that he wanted to stay at Ajax. He scored for Ajax during their 6–0 defeat of Willem II in February 2003, but Koeman again criticised Mido, commenting negatively on his performance against Roda in the KNVB Cup. He was dropped for Ajax's next game against Feyenoord, only featuring as an unused substitute. He suffered a muscle strain in his upper thigh after a friendly for Egypt, and was ruled out of Ajax's game against Groningen. Mido was relegated to the Ajax reserve team for disciplinary reasons, surrounding a perceived lack of effort in training. His situation at the club led to interest from Serie A clubs Juventus and Lazio and he later admitted to have thrown a pair of scissors at Ajax teammate Zlatan Ibrahimović following an argument in March 2003.

==== Loan to Celta Vigo ====
Celta Vigo made a loan offer for Mido in March, which was reported to have fallen through days later as it was not approved by FIFA. However, FIFA eventually allowed the move to go through and it was completed on 18 March. He scored on his Celta Vigo debut against Athletic Bilbao, which Celta won 2–1. Ajax valued Mido between the values of €5 million and €6 million, amidst interest from clubs in Italy and Spain. Newcastle United were reportedly on the verge of making a bid for Mido in May, but this was ruled out by Mido's agent Christophe Henrotay. Ajax attempted to make him return to the club, but he declined this, in favour of staying at Celta. He suffered a muscle injury whilst training in May, but was available to play in Celta's match against Villarreal, which saw Mido sent off in a game which Celta lost 5–0. Mido was linked with a move to Roma in late May, with Roma chairman Franco Sensi stating "I want Mido", but Ajax revealed they wanted €15 million for him. Ajax turned down a loan move from Real Betis for Mido in June. Marseille were then believed to have made an offer for the striker and Celta were not ready to meet Ajax's asking price of €15 million.

=== Marseille ===
Ajax accepted a €12 million bid for Mido from Marseille in July, and completed the move on a five-year contract on 12 July 2003, which made Mido the most expensive Egyptian player ever. He made his debut for Marseille in 1–0 win over Guingamp on 1 August 2003. Jean-Pierre Papin gave praise to Mido, saying it was down to players like him that the French Ligue 1 was among the top European leagues. He scored against Real Madrid in a UEFA Champions League match in November, which Marseille lost 2–1.

Mido stated in March 2004 that he may leave Marseille at the end of the 2003–04 season. An English club and several Spanish clubs were believed to be interested in signing Mido, who had been overshadowed at Marseille by Didier Drogba. Atlético Madrid, Zaragoza, Osasuna and former club Celta Vigo were all rumoured to be interested in signing Mido, with Atlético's interest being confirmed by their Technical Director Toni Muñoz. Meanwhile, Mido was caught speeding on the way to Marseille's game against Monaco, which resulted in a court hearing. Reports suggested Roma were ready to sign Mido for a fee of €9 million even though Mido would be out injured for the rest of the French football season. Turkish side Beşiktaş revealed they wanted to sign him, and Mido said he was to have talks with Bobby Robson about a possible move to Newcastle United.

=== Roma ===
Mido eventually signed for Roma on the final day of the 2004 summer transfer window, for a fee of €6 million, signing a five-year contract. It was confirmed that he would miss the opening game of the season, and possibly the following two games. Mido was penciled in to make his Roma debut against Messina in September 2004, a game in which he did actually play, but Roma lost 4–3. Reports suggested that Mido could be sold to Valencia in a swap deal with Bernardo Corradi and was also linked with a move to Premier League side Manchester City. Southampton were believed to have had Mido on their shortlist of targets, but his agent Christophe Henrotay said Roma would not be willing to let Mido leave the club. It was even reported that he had been offered to Southampton on loan but his new agent, Mino Raiola, repeated the earlier claims that Roma wanted to keep Mido until, at least, the end of the season. He was linked with a move to Tottenham Hotspur, with his agent confirming he wanted a move away from Roma.

==== Loan to Tottenham Hotspur ====
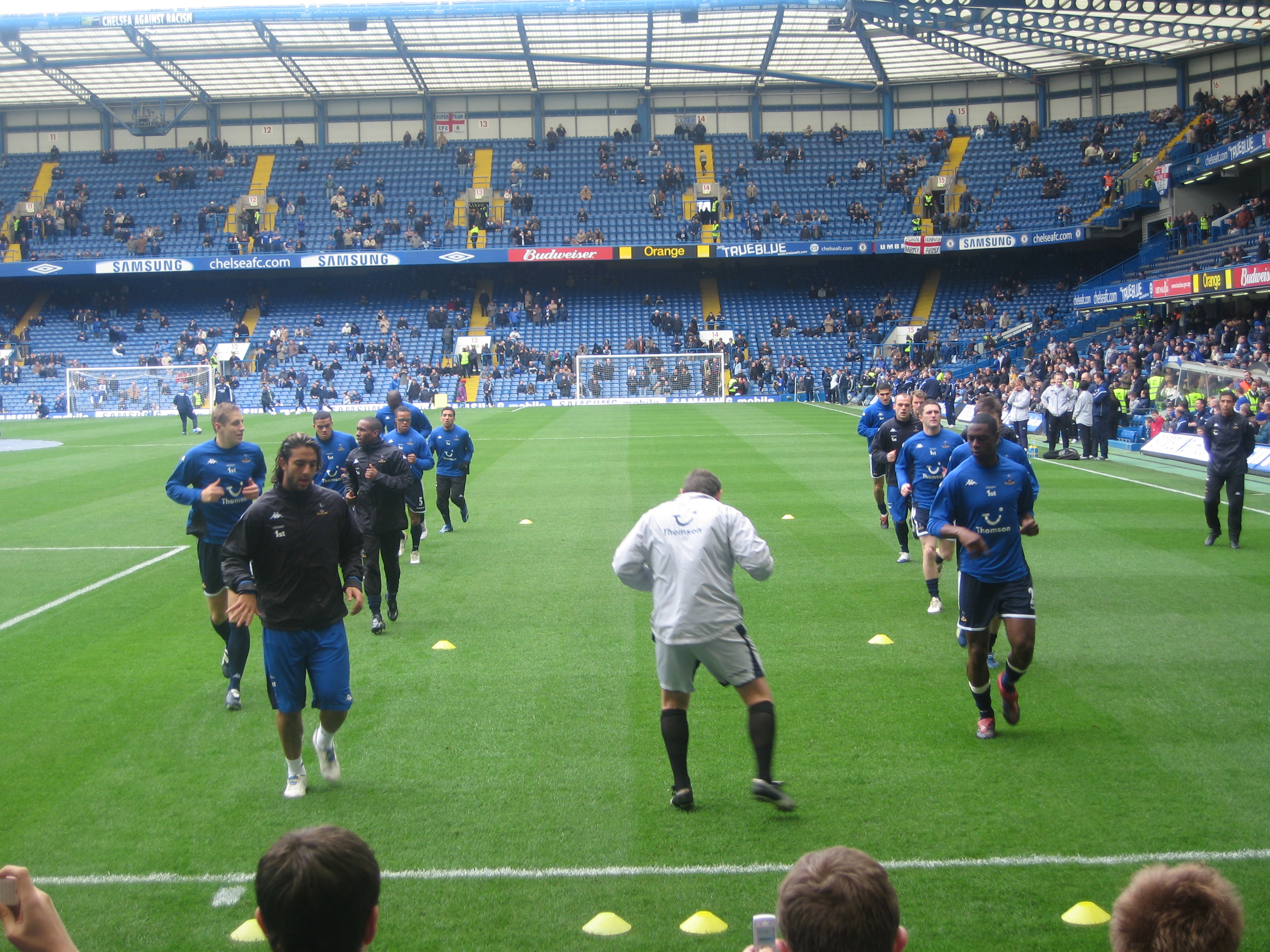
Mido training with Tottenham Hotspur in 2006

Mido was signed by Tottenham on an 18-month loan deal on 28 January 2005. He scored two goals on his Tottenham debut against Portsmouth on 5 February 2005. He scored three goals in eleven appearances during the 2004–05 season for Tottenham. Mido announced plans in July 2005 to launch his own football academy in Egypt, which had the aim of nurturing the country's young talent. In January 2006, he expressed that he did not wish to return to Roma at the end of the 2005–06 season, but rather sign permanently with Tottenham. Tottenham manager Martin Jol said that the club were confident of signing Mido on a permanent deal due to his good performances, but later admitted Tottenham may be defeated in keeping Mido, with other clubs interested in signing him. His permanent move was further put into doubt in April 2006, after he suffered a new injury problem. He suffered abuse from a small section of the Southampton and West Ham United fans in 2005. West Ham manager Alan Pardew apologised to Mido for the abuse by the fans. He finished the 2005–06 season with eleven goals in 27 games, meaning he was Tottenham's second highest goalscorer. Tottenham confirmed in May 2006 that Mido would be returning to Roma. In the 2006 Supercoppa Italiana against Inter Milan on 26 August, Mido came on for Francesco Totti in the 72nd minute. Roma's 3–1 lead became a 4–3 defeat after extra time. Mido later recalled that Rosella Sensi criticized him in the dressing room while speaking to his agent, Mino Raiola, whose interpretation of her remarks led to an angry confrontation that required security to intervene.

=== Tottenham Hotspur ===
However, Mido re-joined Tottenham on 29 August on a permanent deal for a fee of €6.75 million. After returning to Tottenham, he commented on the team's official website that he "always knew in his heart he would be coming back" and that he "couldn't wait to pull on a Tottenham shirt, play at the Lane and score some more goals". However, soon after this, Mido was accused of being "irresponsible and disrespectful" by his manager Martin Jol, following comments Mido had made about former Tottenham player Sol Campbell. After failing to score in his first five appearances as a permanent Tottenham player, he finally found the net against rivals West Ham with a match-winning volley on 19 October 2006, and followed that with two goals against League Two side Milton Keynes Dons in the League Cup. He had to contend with being fourth in line for one of the two striking spots, but insisted that this was a sign of the club's strength, and something he was fully aware of before rejoining the club. However, he was linked with a move to Manchester City. Mido scored what looked to be his final goal for Tottenham on 31 January 2007 against Arsenal, but his potential move to Manchester City fell through half an hour before the close of the transfer window. He eventually admitted he made a mistake by joining Tottenham on a permanent deal. He ended the 2006–07 season with 23 appearances and 5 goals.

=== Middlesbrough ===
Tottenham agreed a £6 million fee with Birmingham City for Mido on 20 July 2007. Birmingham manager Steve Bruce said the move was close to collapsing, as the deal reportedly faltered over the wages and the length of contract Mido was demanding. The deal eventually fell through over a clause that Mido insisted be in the contract. In August 2007, Sunderland made a £6 million bid for him and held talks, after which Birmingham confirmed they were trying to revive their deal to sign Mido. Middlesbrough then revealed their interest in signing him, matching the £6 million fee of Birmingham and Sunderland and were given permission to speak to him. They eventually signed Mido for a fee of £6 million on a four-year contract on 16 August 2007. He scored on his debut for Middlesbrough against Fulham and on his home debut against Newcastle United. During the Newcastle game, Mido was reportedly subject to Islamophobic abuse from some Newcastle supporters, which The Football Association (The FA) was to investigate.

He suffered a stress fracture to the pubic bone which kept him out for more than three months from November 2007, until he returned to first-team action for Middlesbrough's 2–0 FA Cup victory over Mansfield Town on 26 January 2008. He was sent off in the 80th minute in a match against Arsenal on 15 March 2008, after kicking Gaël Clichy in the face with his boot, which resulted in him receiving a three-match ban. Mido was ruled out for the remainder of the 2007–08 season in April following a hernia operation on a pelvic injury. He made the bench for Middlesbrough's opening Premier League fixture against former club Tottenham and came on as a substitute in the 82nd minute and scored four minutes later after deflecting Didier Digard's shot. The following weekend saw him score against Liverpool at Anfield to put Middlesbrough 1–0 in the lead, but they eventually lost the game 2–1. This was followed up with goals against Yeovil Town in the League Cup and Portsmouth in the league. Mido was again targeted by some Newcastle fans while warming up before Middlesbrough's 0–0 draw, with claims of racist chanting being investigated by the FA. He revealed his anger at the FA's investigation, believing that they would make no difference to any future abuse. Two men were eventually arrested over the chanting and were due to appear at Teesside Magistrates Court.

==== Loan to Wigan Athletic ====
Mido entered talks with Wigan Athletic over signing on a six-month loan deal, and he completed the move on 23 January 2009. He scored on his debut with the equalizing goal against Liverpool with a penalty kick in a 1–1 draw on 28 January. He scored for Wigan in a 4–1 defeat against Arsenal and he finished the loan spell with 12 appearances and 2 goals. Following Middlesbrough's relegation to the Championship, he failed to report to pre-season training, and he was eventually fined by the club after not turning up after a fortnight. He returned to training a day after this.

==== Loan to Zamalek ====
Middlesbrough accepted an undisclosed offer for Mido from an unnamed club on 26 July, and he completed a season-long move to former club Zamalek on 3 August, who had an option to sign him permanently if they were able to meet Middlesbrough's terms. On 20 August, Mido made a disappointing debut for Zamalek, wasting a second-half penalty as Zamalek threw away their lead to suffer a late 2–1 home victory to Petrojet in the Egyptian Premier League.

==== Loan to West Ham United ====
Mido joined West Ham United on a four-month loan in February 2010 after his season-long loan spell with Zamalek was terminated by mutual agreement. West Ham chairman David Sullivan announced that, in order for Mido to secure his long-term footballing future, his contract with West Ham put him amongst the lowest earners in the Premier League. Sullivan said: "He doesn't want to be known as a 'has been' of English football, so he was willing to come here to play for a nominal fee, just £1,000 a week." Mido made his debut for West Ham on 6 February in 2–1 away defeat against Burnley. In nine appearances for West Ham, he failed to score and had a penalty kick saved in a 2–2 away draw against Everton. In June 2010, West Ham decided not to offer him a new contract.

==== Return to Ajax ====
Ajax entered talks with Middlesbrough over signing Mido on a free transfer in July. On 1 September, he signed a one-year loan contract. Mido made his league second debut on 16 October 2010, coming on as a substitute for Miralem Sulejmani in a 3–0 win against NAC Breda. He scored his first goal on 11 November in a 3–0 win against Veendam in the Dutch Cup. Despite scoring three goals in six appearances, his first-team football opportunities were limited, having been on the starting line-up only once. After Martin Jol resigned, Mido lost his place when new manager Frank de Boer was appointed on 6 December 2010. On 4 January 2011, he wrote Ajax a letter to cancel his contract.

=== Return to Zamalek ===
On 21 January 2011, Mido rejoined Zamalek on a three-and-a-half-year contract. However, due to an error made by Zamalek management Mido was not registered in time to play with Zamalek thus sitting out the remainder of the season.

=== Barnsley ===
On 16 June 2012, Mido agreed a deal with English Championship side Barnsley, subject to a medical. His move was completed on 21 June 2012 when he signed a one-year contract with Barnsley. Mido made his league debut on 10 November 2012 as a substitute for Kelvin Etuhu in a 1–0 home defeat against Huddersfield Town. On 31 January 2013, he was released by mutual consent along with defender Lee Collins.

== International career ==
Mido played 13 times for the Egypt youth team between 1999 and 2001.

He has earned 51 caps for Egypt and scored 20 goals. Mido scored on his international debut against the United Arab Emirates, which Egypt won 2–1. Mido sent a fax to the Egypt team to tell them he was not available for international selection in May 2004, saying he was not psychologically fit to join the team. Mido was a part of the Egypt squad that played at the 2004 African Cup of Nations.

Egypt manager Marco Tardelli dropped Mido in September 2004, after Mido claimed to be unavailable for the national team due to an injury, but played in a friendly match for Roma 24 hours later. A day later, Mido rejected accusations that he refused to play for his country. Also, the Egyptian Football Association announced that he would not play for the team again. However, Tardelli was sacked as Egypt coach and in January 2005 the Egyptian Football Association said they would consider bringing Mido back into the team if he were to apologise for his past behaviour. Mido flew to Cairo in February 2005 and made a public apology and the following month he was recalled by the national team. Mido withdrew from Egypt's 2006 World Cup qualifier against Cameroon, after sustaining a muscle tear while playing with Tottenham Hotspur.

Mido was thrown out of the Egypt team during the 2006 African Cup of Nations as a consequence of an argument with coach Hassan Shehata in the semi-final game against Senegal, which started after Mido reacted badly to being substituted. His replacement Amr Zaki came on to score a header with his first touch, putting Egypt into the final. A day later, Mido reconciled with Shehata, but was given a six-month suspension from playing with Egypt. Mido was eventually recalled by the side following his suspension, ready for the 2008 African Cup of Nations qualification which Egypt won. Mido was included in the Egypt squad to play South Africa in London in November 2006, despite suffering from a knee injury at the time. However, he was left out of the Egypt squad to play Mauritania in an African Nations Cup qualifier in March 2007.

== Retirement and post-retirement career ==
His retirement from football was announced in June 2013.

Prior to his retirement, Mido was named Honorary Life President of the Old Wykehamist Football Club, a club for alumni of Winchester College and one of the founding member clubs of the Arthurian League.

After his retirement, Mido turned to analysing Premier League matches as well as Champions league matches on Al Jazeera Sports channels. He also has his own show on AlHayat TV as well as an on-line show on FilGoal. He later hosted (Arabic: أوضة اللبس, lit. 'Dressing room') on Al-Nahar.

In January 2026, Mido sparked controversy after claiming on a podcast that "magic and red mercury" and religious figures influenced Africa Cup of Nations team rituals and squad selections, suggesting this affected his exclusion from the 2010 squad. His remarks drew criticism for questioning the legitimacy of Egypt's achievements, leading the Supreme Council for Media Regulation to bar him from media appearances pending an investigation. Mido defended his comments, saying they were taken out of context.

== Managerial career ==
=== Zamalek ===
Although he received numerous offers from teams like Paris Saint-Germain Youth Academy and Egyptian team Al-Masry but turned them down. He was appointed as Zamalek head coach after the firing of Helmy Toulan on 21 January 2014, despite being only 30 years old. Mido led his team to the third place in the 2013–14 Egyptian Premier League and secured a place in the 2015 CAF Confederation Cup after a 1–0 loss to his rival Al-Ahly, 2–1 loss to Alexandria side Smouha and then a 2–0 win over Petrojet.
Mido succeeded to win the Egypt Cup and secure the cup title for the second year in row, by beating Smouha 1–0, making him the youngest manager to win a trophy with his team in Egypt. On 29 July 2014, Mido was replaced by Hossam Hassan as the manager of Zamalek.

=== Zamalek Youth Academy ===
He later accepted an offer from Zamalek's chairman Mortada Mansour to be the Director of Zamalek Youth Academy with appointing his former assistant Mohamed Salah as the technical manager of Zamalek Youth Academy. Under his leadership, The U-16 team won Al Wehda International Championship after defeating FC Steaua București U-16 by a result of 2–0 in the final.

=== Ismaily ===
On 15 July 2015, Ismaily's chairman Mohamed Abo El-Soud announced that Mido will be the manager of the team. He also announced that Ashraf Khedr will be the assistant manager. He resigned from his position on 20 December 2015 following a developed problem with the team captain Hosny Abd Rabo.

=== Return to Zamalek ===
Zamalek's chairman Mortada Mansour announced the return of Mido as the manager of Zamalek, succeeding Marcos Paquetá who failed to control the team. He also appointed Hazem Emam as the general manager and Ismail Youssef as the technical director. After only one month as a manager, he was fired after a 2–0 loss to rivals Al Ahly in Cairo derby, leading to increase the gap between the two teams to seven points. Later Mortada Mansour said that the board decided to remove Mido from his position after the loss to Ismaily, but announcing it was delayed until Cairo Derby is played, to avoid distraction of players.

=== Lierse ===
On 7 July 2016, Lierse's chairman Maged Samy announced the hiring of Mido as a technical adviser for Lierse and Wadi Degla. Mido said that he aims to help the club to get promoted to Belgian First Division A.

=== Wadi Degla ===
On 8 November 2016, he was appointed as the manager of Wadi Degla until the end of the 2016–17 season following the sack of Patrice Carteron. Mido also stated that he accepted the job in order to be qualified for UEFA A License which requires the applicant to be currently managing a team.

=== Al Wehda ===
On 17 December 2018, he became technical advisor and caretaker manager at Al Wehda, after the sacking of Fábio Carille. He was later sacked on 19 March 2019.

=== El Makkasa ===
On 9 June 2019, Mido was appointed manager of El Makkasa. He was later sacked in January 2020.

=== Ismaily ===
Ismaily was in desperate need of good coaching during the 2022–23 season, he would be sacked after nine games. His last game was a draw against Ghazl El-Mahalla, where they gave away a win in the last minute of the game. He was angered as he labeled that the club board "disrespected" him because a warning of his probable sacking wasn't given. His only win with them was a 3–1 victory against El-Dakhelya.

== Administrative career ==
In June 2025, Mido became a strategic advisor for scouting and recruitment for the Cypriot side Enosis Neon Paralimni.

== Personal life ==
Mido's father, Hossam Wasfi, was also a footballer who played for Zamalek. In 2002, Mido married at age 19, and later had three sons.

At the age of 34, he reached 150 kilograms (330 lb) in weight which made him vulnerable to diabetes; however, he managed to lose 37 kilograms (82 lb) in five months.

== Career statistics ==
=== Club ===
Appearances and goals by club, season and competition
Club	Season	League			National cup (Note: Includes KNVB Cup, Coupe de France, Coppa Italia, FA Cup)		League cup (Note: Includes Football League Cup)		Continental		Other		Total	
Club	Season	Division	Apps	Goals	Apps	Goals	Apps	Goals	Apps	Goals	Apps	Goals	Apps	Goals
Zamalek	1999–2000	Egyptian Premier League	4	3	0	0	—		1	0	—		5	3
Gent	2000–01	Belgian First Division	23	11	0	0	—		2 (Note: Appearances in UEFA Cup)	0	—		25	11
Ajax	2001–02	Eredivisie	24	12	2	1	—		2	0	—		28	13
Ajax	2002–03	Eredivisie	16	9	1	0	—		8	1	1 (Note: Appearance in Johan Cruyff Shield)	1	26	11
Ajax	Total		40	21	3	1	—		10	1	1	1	54	24
Celta Vigo	2002–03	La Liga	8	4	0	0	—		0	0	—		8	4
Marseille	2003–04	Ligue 1	22	7	1	0	0	0	11 (Note: Seven appearances and two goals in UEFA Champions League, four appearances in UEFA Cup)	2	—		34	9
Roma	2004–05	Serie A	8	0	1	0	—		4 (Note: Appearances in UEFA Champions League)	0	—		13	0
Roma	2006–07	Serie A	—		—		—		—		1 (Note: Appearance in Supercoppa Italiana)	0	1	0
Roma	Total		8	0	1	0	—		4	0	1	0	14	0
Tottenham Hotspur (loan)	2004–05	Premier League	9	2	2	1	0	0	—		—		11	3
Tottenham Hotspur (loan)	2005–06	Premier League	27	11	0	0	0	0	—		—		27	11
Tottenham Hotspur	2006–07	Premier League	12	1	3	1	4	3	4	0	—		23	5
Tottenham Hotspur	Total		48	14	5	2	4	3	4	0	—		61	19
Middlesbrough	2007–08	Premier League	12	2	4	0	1	0	—		—		17	2
Middlesbrough	2008–09	Premier League	13	4	1	0	1	1	—		—		15	5
Middlesbrough	2009–10	Championship	0	0	0	0	0	0	—		—		0	0
Middlesbrough	Total		25	6	5	0	2	1	—		—		32	7
Wigan Athletic (loan)	2008–09	Premier League	12	2	0	0	0	0	—		—		12	2
Zamalek (loan)	2009–10	Egyptian Premier League	11	1	0	0	—		0	0	—		11	1
West Ham United (loan)	2009–10	Premier League	9	0	0	0	0	0	—		—		9	0
Ajax (loan)	2010–11	Eredivisie	5	2	1	1	—		0	0	0	0	6	3
Zamalek	2010–11	Egyptian Premier League	0	0	0	0	—		0	0	—		0	0
Zamalek	2011–12	Egyptian Premier League	3	2	0	0	—		1	1	—		4	3
Zamalek	Total		3	2	0	0	—		1	1	—		4	3
Barnsley	2012–13	Championship	1	0	0	0	0	0	—		—		1	0
Career total			219	73	16	4	6	4	33	4	2	1	276	86

=== International ===
Appearances and goals by year and competition
National team	Year	Apps	Goals
Egypt
Egypt	2001	14	6
Egypt	2002	8	3
Egypt	2003	8	6
Egypt	2004	4	0
Egypt	2005	5	3
Egypt	2006	6	1
Egypt	2007	2	0
Egypt	2008	2	0
Egypt	2009	2	0
Total		51	19

Egypt score listed first, score column indicates score after each Mido goal.

International goals by date, venue, opponent, score, result and competition
No.	Date	Venue	Cap	Opponent	Score	Result	Competition
1	6 January 2001	Cairo International Stadium, Cairo, Egypt	1	United Arab Emirates	2–1	2–1	Friendly
2	6 May 2001	Cairo International Stadium, Cairo, Egypt	8	Senegal	1–0	1–0	2002 FIFA World Cup qualification
3	3 June 2001	Alexandria Stadium, Alexandria, Egypt	9	Sudan	1–0	3–2	2002 African Cup of Nations qualification
4	3 June 2001	Alexandria Stadium, Alexandria, Egypt	9	Sudan	2–0	3–2	2002 African Cup of Nations qualification
5	21 July 2001	Stade 19 Mai 1956, Annaba, Algeria	13	Algeria	1–1	1–1	2002 FIFA World Cup qualification
6	30 December 2001	Khalifa International Stadium, Doha, Qatar	14	Qatar	2–1	2–2	Friendly
7	6 January 2002	Ismailia Stadium, Ismailia, Egypt	16	Mali	1–0	1–2	Friendly
8	11 January 2002	Cairo International Stadium, Cairo, Egypt	17	Burkina Faso	1–0	2–2	Friendly
9	31 January 2002	Stade Modibo Kéïta, Bamako, Mali	20	Zambia	1–0	2–1	2002 African Cup of Nations
10	29 March 2003	Rose Hill Stadium, Port Louis, Mauritius	24	Mauritius	1–0	1–0	2004 African Cup of Nations qualification
11	8 June 2003	Port Said Stadium, Port Said, Egypt	26	Mauritius	1–0	7–0	2004 African Cup of Nations qualification
12	8 June 2003	Port Said Stadium, Port Said, Egypt	26	Mauritius	3–0	7–0	2004 African Cup of Nations qualification
13	20 June 2003	Arab Contractors Stadium, Cairo, Egypt	27	Madagascar	4–0	6–0	2004 African Cup of Nations qualification
14	10 October 2003	Cairo International Stadium, Cairo, Egypt	28	Senegal	1–0	1–0	Friendly
15	15 November 2003	Cairo International Stadium, Cairo, Egypt	29	South Africa	2–1	2–1	Friendly
16	27 March 2005	Arab Contractors Stadium, Cairo, Egypt	35	Libya	1–1	4–1	2006 FIFA World Cup qualification
17	4 September 2005	Arab Contractors Stadium, Cairo, Egypt	38	Benin	3–1	4–1	2006 FIFA World Cup qualification
18	16 November 2005	Arab Contractors Stadium, Cairo, Egypt	39	Tunisia	1–0	1–2	Friendly
19	20 January 2006	Cairo International Stadium, Cairo, Egypt	40	Libya	1–0	3–0	2006 Africa Cup of Nations

== Managerial statistics ==
As of match played 22 February 2023

Managerial record by team and tenure
Team	From	To	Record				
Team	From	To	P	W	D	L	Win %
Zamalek	22 January 2014	29 July 2014	31	16	8	7	51.61
Ismaily	16 July 2015	21 December 2015	9	5	1	3	55.56
Zamalek	4 January 2016	10 February 2016	7	4	1	2	57.14
Wadi Degla	7 November 2016	4 December 2017	42	10	14	18	23.81
Al Wehda	16 December 2018	19 March 2019	12	5	3	4	41.67
El Makkasa	9 June 2019	21 January 2020	16	3	5	8	18.75
Ismaily	27 December 2022	22 February 2023	9	1	5	3	11.11
Total			126	44	37	45	34.92

== Honours ==
=== Player ===
Zamalek

- African Cup Winners' Cup: 2000

Ajax

- Eredivisie: 2001–02, 2010–11
- KNVB Cup: 2001–02
- Johan Cruyff Shield: 2002

Egypt

- Africa Cup of Nations: 2006

=== Individual ===
- Belgian Ebony Shoe: 2001
- Belgian League Young Player of the Year: 2000–01
- EFA Young Player of the Year: 2000–01
- African Young Player of the Year: 2001–02

=== Manager ===
Zamalek

- Egypt Cup: 2014
