= Juan Velasco (disambiguation) =

Juan Velasco Alvarado (1910–1977) was a left-leaning Peruvian general who ruled Peru from 1968 to 1975 under the title of "President of the Revolutionary Government."

Juan Velasco may also refer to:

- Juan Fernández de Velasco y Tovar, 5th Duke of Frías (c. 1550–1613), Spanish diplomat
- Juan Fernando Velasco (born 1972), Ecuadorian musician
- Juan Velasco Damas (born 1977), Spanish footballer
- Juan Zambudio Velasco (1921–2004), Spanish footballer
- Juan de Velasco (1727–1792), Jesuit priest, historian, and professor of philosophy and theology
