= Zarra Trophy =

Domestic goalscorer award in La Liga

The Zarra Trophy is a trophy awarded annually by the Spanish sports daily Marca to the Spanish domestic player with the highest goal total in La Liga. It is named after the former Athletic Bilbao striker Telmo Zarra, at that time the all-time top scorer in the competition, and was inaugurated after his death in February 2006.

The first winner in 2006 was David Villa of Valencia. He holds the record for awards won with a total of four (all while playing for that club), tied with Iago Aspas of Celta Vigo.

== La Liga ==
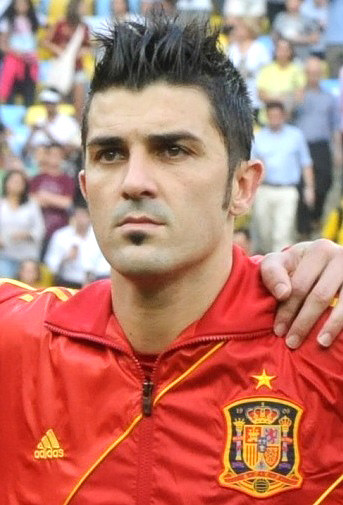
David Villa has won the award four times, a joint record

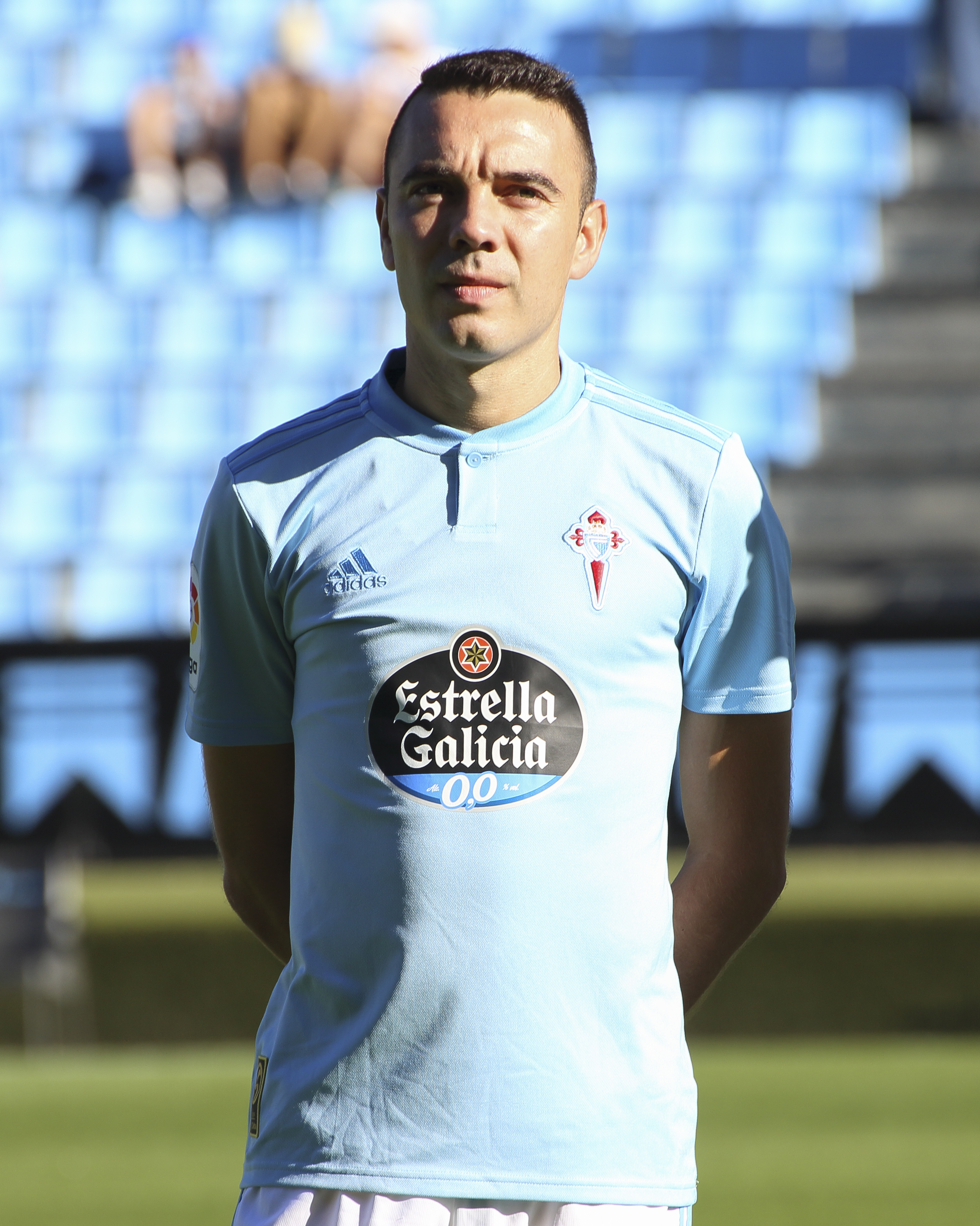
Iago Aspas won the award for three consecutive seasons.

Players in bold won the Pichichi Trophy in the same season.

Season	Player(s)	Club(s)	Goals
2005–06	(Asturias) David Villa	Valencia	25
2006–07	(Asturias) David Villa	Valencia	16
2007–08	(Andalusia) **Dani Güiza**	Mallorca	27
2008–09	(Asturias) David Villa	Valencia	28
2009–10	(Asturias) David Villa	Valencia	21
2010–11	(Community of Madrid) Álvaro Negredo	Sevilla	20
2011–12	(Valencian Community) Roberto Soldado (Note: Although tied with Fernando Llorente, Soldado won the award due to his superior goals to games ratio.)	Valencia	17
2012–13	(Community of Madrid) Álvaro Negredo	Sevilla	25
2013–14	Diego Costa (Note: Born in Brazil, naturalized as a Spanish citizen in July 2013.)	Atlético Madrid	27
2014–15	(Basque Country (autonomous community)) Aritz Aduriz	Athletic Bilbao	18
2015–16	(Basque Country (autonomous community)) Aritz Aduriz	Athletic Bilbao	20
2016–17	(Galicia (Spain)) Iago Aspas	Celta Vigo	19
2017–18	(Galicia (Spain)) Iago Aspas	Celta Vigo	22
2018–19	(Galicia (Spain)) Iago Aspas	Celta Vigo	20
2019–20	(Catalonia) Gerard Moreno	Villarreal	18
2020–21	(Catalonia) Gerard Moreno	Villarreal	23
2021–22	(Galicia (Spain)) Iago Aspas	Celta Vigo	18
2022–23	Joselu (Note: Born in West Germany, naturalized as a Spanish citizen during his youth.)	Espanyol	16
2023–24	(Community of Madrid) Borja Mayoral (Note: Although tied with Álvaro Morata, Mayoral won the award due to his superior goals to games ratio.)	Getafe	15
2024–25	(Canary Islands) Ayoze Pérez	Villarreal	19
2025–26	(Catalonia) Lamine Yamal (Note: Although tied with Ferran Torres, Yamal won the award due to his superior goals to games ratio.)	Barcelona	16

== Segunda División ==
Players in bold finished as top scorer in the same season.

Season	Player(s)	Club(s)	Goals
2005–06	(Andalusia) **José Juan Luque**	Ciudad de Murcia	19
2005–06	(Valencian Community) **Roberto Soldado**	Real Madrid Castilla	19
2006–07	(Andalusia) **Marcos Márquez**	Las Palmas	21
2007–08	(Andalusia) **Yordi**	Xerez	20
2008–09	(Andalusia) **Nino**	Tenerife	28
2009–10	(Valencian Community) **Jorge Molina**	Elche	26
2010–11	(Catalonia) **Jonathan Soriano**	Barcelona B	32
2011–12	(Galicia (Spain)) Iago Aspas	Celta Vigo	23
2012–13	(Canary Islands) Jesé	Real Madrid Castilla	22
2013–14	(La Rioja) **Borja Viguera**	Alavés	25
2014–15	(Canary Islands) **Rubén Castro**	Betis	32
2015–16	(Andalusia) **Sergio León**	Elche	22
2016–17	(Andalusia) **Joselu**	Lugo	23
2017–18	(Community of Madrid) **Jaime Mata**	Valladolid	33
2018–19	(Valencian Community) **Álvaro Giménez**	Almería	20
2019–20	(Andalusia) Stoichkov	Alcorcón	16
2020–21	(Community of Madrid) **Raúl de Tomás**	Espanyol	23
2021–22	(Community of Madrid) **Borja Bastón**	Oviedo	22
2022–23	(Catalonia) Raúl García	Mirandés	19
2023–24	(Catalonia) Gerard Fernández	Racing Santander	18
2024–25	(Andalusia) Andrés Martín	Racing Santander	16
2025–26	(Community of Madrid) **Sergio Arribas**	Almería	25

== See also ==
- Don Balón Award
- Pichichi Trophy
- Zamora Trophy
- Trofeo Alfredo Di Stéfano
- Miguel Muñoz Trophy
- Ballon d'Or
