= Manolo (footballer, born 1947) =

Spanish former footballer (born 1947)

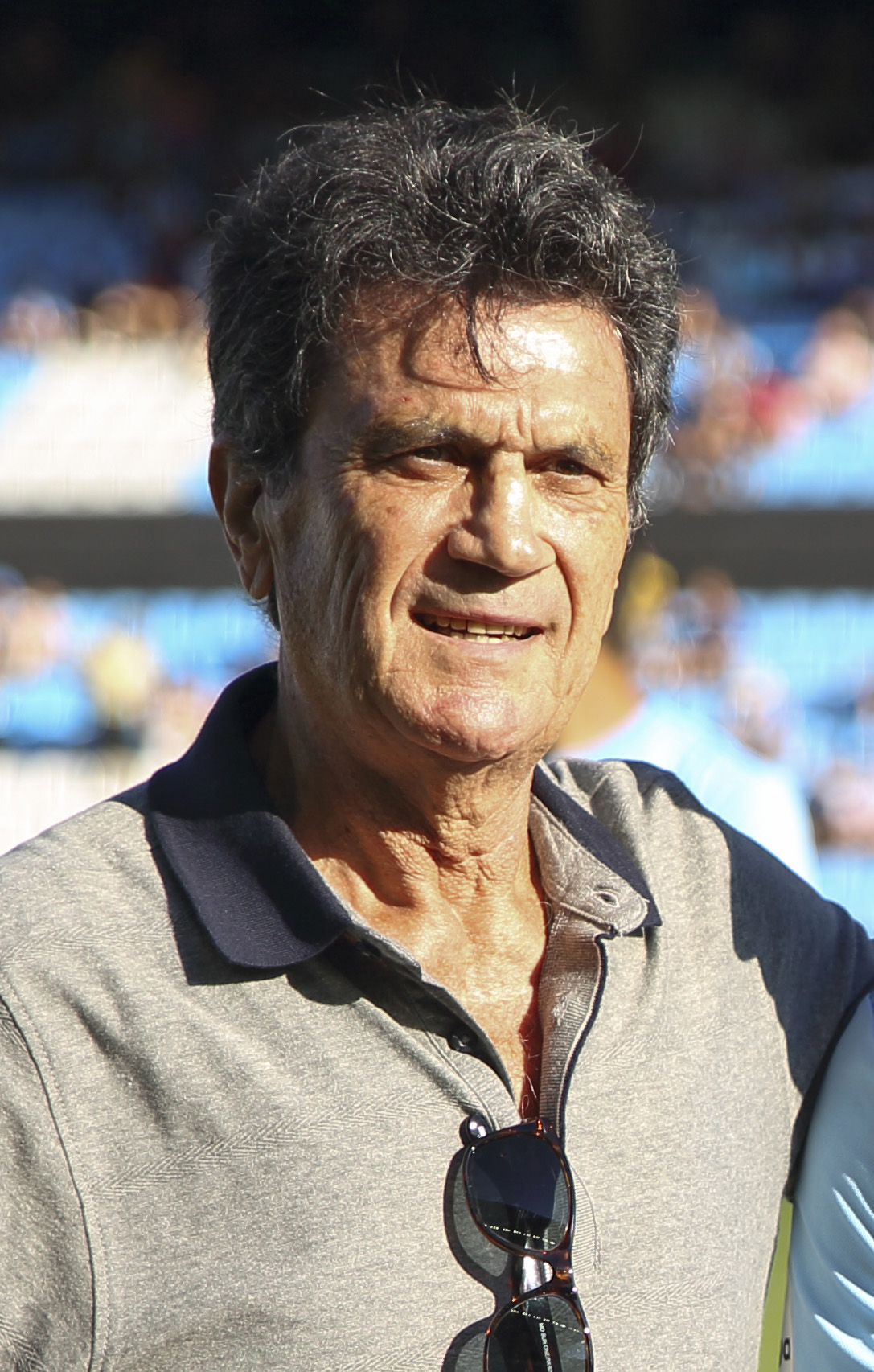
- Manolo during the 2018 Trofeo Memorial Quinocho

Personal information
- Full name: Manuel Rodríguez Alfonso
- Date of birth: 22 December 1947 (age 78)
- Place of birth: Cangas, Spain
- Height: 1.76 m (5 ft 9 in)
- Position: Defender

Youth career
- 1962–1966: Celta

Senior career*
Years	Team	Apps	(Gls)
1966–1982	Celta	462	(16)

International career
1966–1972	Spain Olympic	4	(0)
- * Club domestic league appearances and goals

Manuel Rodríguez Alfonso (born 22 December 1947), known as Manolo, is a Spanish former professional footballer who played as a defender.

He spent his entire career with Celta de Vigo, making 533 appearances for the club which was an all-time record for several decades.

== Club career ==
Born in Cangas, Pontevedra, Manolo joined RC Celta de Vigo's academy at age 14. In 1966, he was promoted to the first team and made his debut for them in the Segunda División.

Manolo appeared in his first La Liga game on 14 September 1969, in a 2–1 away loss against Real Sociedad. He scored his first official goal on 23 June 1968, helping to a 3–2 comeback win over Real Madrid in the first leg of the semi-finals of the Copa del Generalísimo. The first of four in the domestic league came on 14 February 1971, the only as the hosts beat UD Las Palmas.

On 27 January 1974, Manolo suffered a serious knee injury after a tough tackle by FC Barcelona's Johan Cruyff; he continued to play in the following weeks, however, with the aid of anti-inflammatory drugs. Three years later, when the two teams met again at the Camp Nou, he refused to be selected as captain in order to avoid saluting the Dutchman.

Manolo remained at the club, as captain, until the end of the 1981–82 season, promoting to the top flight as champion. He totalled 533 matches during his spell (including two in the 1971–72 UEFA Cup, a first-ever European participation for the Galicians), holding the all-time record until 2025–26 when he was surpassed by Iago Aspas; of those, 226 were in the top division.

On 6 May 1982, 30,000 people gathered at Balaídos Stadium to watch Manolo's farewell match between Celta and the Poland national team.

== International career ==
Manolo played for the Galicia national team in the Copa Nacional de Selecciones, and also represented Spain at Olympic level. In 1974, he was poised to be called up by the full side, but it did not come to fruition due to his knee injury.

== Honours ==
Celta

- Segunda División: 1981–82
- Segunda División B: 1980–81

== See also ==
- List of one-club men
