= Mario Turdó =

Argentine footballer

Personal information
- Full name: Mario Héctor Turdó
- Date of birth: January 1, 1979 (age 47)
- Place of birth: Rosario, Argentina
- Height: 1.85 m (6 ft 1 in)
- Position: Striker

Senior career*
Years	Team	Apps	(Gls)
1997–1999	Independiente	27	(2)
1999–2000	Celta Vigo	25	(7)
2000	Rennes	18	(3)
2001	Las Palmas	14	(1)
2001–2003	Rennes	18	(3)
2003–2004	Leganés	6	(1)
2005–2006	Quilmes	24	(2)
2006–2008	Gimnasia y Esgrima	25	(1)
2008–2009	San Martín de Tucumán	18	(3)
Total		402	(20)
- * Club domestic league appearances and goals as of 22:49, 25 June 2009 (UTC)

Mario Héctor Turdó (born 1 January 1979 in Rosario) is an Argentine football striker currently without a club.

Turdó started his playing career in 1997 with Independiente.

In 1999, he moved to Europe where he played for Celta Vigo, UD Las Palmas and CD Leganés in Spain and Stade Rennais F.C. in France.

In 2005 Turdó returned to Argentina to play for Quilmes. He has since played for Gimnasia de Jujuy and San Martín de Tucumán
