= Jesuli =

Spanish footballer (born 1978)

Personal information
- Full name: Jesús Antonio Mora Nieto
- Date of birth: 24 January 1978 (age 48)
- Place of birth: Seville, Spain
- Height: 1.78 m (5 ft 10 in)
- Position: Winger

Youth career
- Sevilla

Senior career*
Years	Team	Apps	(Gls)
1996–1998	Sevilla B	19	(3)
1997–2000	Sevilla	64	(3)
2000–2004	Celta	118	(24)
2004–2008	Sevilla	23	(1)
2007	→ Real Sociedad (loan)	11	(0)
2008	→ Tenerife (loan)	7	(0)
Total		242	(31)

International career
1996	Spain U18	4	(0)
- * Club domestic league appearances and goals

Jesús Antonio Mora Nieto (born 24 January 1978), known as Jesuli, is a Spanish former professional footballer who played as a winger.

He amassed La Liga totals of 184 matches and 28 goals over nine seasons, representing in the competition Sevilla, Celta and Real Sociedad.

== Club career ==
Jesuli was born in Seville. After making his professional debut with hometown's Sevilla FC, playing one game in the closing stages of the 1996–97 season (a 3–1 home win over RCD Espanyol), with the Andalusia side ultimately being relegated from La Liga, the skilled player alternated between the A and B sides before being definitely promoted for the 1998–99 campaign, which ended in a return to the top division.

Signing in the 2000 summer transfer window, Jesuli would serve his most successful stint at RC Celta de Vigo, scoring seven league goals in his third year as the Galician team qualified for the UEFA Champions League for the first time ever. That earned him a return move to his first club, which coincided which Celta's 2004 relegation.

In his second spell at Sevilla, Jesuli appeared sporadically: he was restricted to Copa del Rey matches in 2006–07 and not registered at all – alongside teammate Fernando Sales – in the following season, while also hampered by several injuries.

In January 2008, Jesuli was loaned to Segunda División team CD Tenerife for the rest of the campaign, where he would also feature sparingly. Having subsequently returned to Sevilla he was left to train with the reserves, as he was not part of coach Manuel Jiménez's plans.

=== Controversy ===
According to newspaper El Mundo, Jesuli was recorded by Iñaki Badiola, president of Real Sociedad, in a conversation where he confirmed that the players of Tenerife received around €6.000 each to lose the last match of the 2007–08 season, against Málaga CF. As a result of the 2–1 away loss the latter achieved promotion, while the Basques remained in the second division.

Jesuli was injured at that time so he did not take part in the aforementioned fixture. During the conversation, Badiola and Jesuli also speculate that the possible money dealer was Lorenzo Sanz (former president of Real Madrid), whose son, Fernando, occupied the chairman position at Málaga.

The captains of Tenerife denied such accusations, while stating that Jesuli's was probably joking or under pressure to make such declarations. Lorenzo Sanz declared that the accusation was ridiculous, while a spokesperson for the Royal Spanish Football Federation initially affirmed that they already knew the case but it was investigated and rejected at that time; the federation, however, later denied that there were any current formal complaints about possible bribery, as the spokesperson's declarations were actually about a different game.

Surprisingly, a few hours later, Jesuli also denied that Tenerife's players received money to arrange the match in a press release. On the other hand, Badiola insisted in the media that he received consent from the player to record the conversation, and that the latter was ready to go further with the issue.

A few days later, El Mundo published the second part of the recorded conversation, where Jesuli is supposed to show that he knew Badiola was recording the conversation.

== Honours ==
Celta

- UEFA Intertoto Cup: 2000

Sevilla

- Copa del Rey: 2005–06, 2006–07
- UEFA Cup: 2005–06, 2006–07
