= Israel Delgado =

Spanish footballer

Personal information
- Full name: Israel Delgado Andrés
- Date of birth: 22 January 1979 (age 47)
- Place of birth: Madrid, Spain
- Height: 1.76 m (5 ft 9 in)
- Position: Left-back

Youth career
- Alcalá

Senior career*
Years	Team	Apps	(Gls)
1998–2000	Guadalajara		
2000–2004	Celta B	115	(4)
2003–2005	Celta	30	(0)
2005–2006	Córdoba	28	(1)
2006–2007	Lorca Deportiva	32	(1)
2007–2009	Cultural Leonesa	29	(0)
2009–2010	Toledo	30	(0)
2010	Premià	10	(0)
2011–2015	Cornellà	113	(1)
Total		387+	(7+)
- * Club domestic league appearances and goals

Israel Delgado Andrés (born 22 January 1979 in Madrid) is a Spanish former professional footballer who played as a left-back.
