= Jorge Rodríguez (footballer, born 1980) =

Spanish footballer

Personal information
- Full name: Jorge Eugenio Rodríguez Álvarez
- Date of birth: 11 August 1980 (age 46)
- Place of birth: Cee, Spain
- Height: 1.84 m (6 ft 0 in)
- Position: Centre-back

Youth career
- Calasancio
- Celta

Senior career*
Years	Team	Apps	(Gls)
1998–2005	Celta B	180	(22)
2003–2005	Celta	2	(0)
2005–2006	Racing Ferrol	12	(2)
2006	Mérida	16	(0)
2006–2007	Ourense	33	(1)
2007–2008	Zamora	35	(2)
2008–2009	Pontevedra	32	(0)
2009–2012	Oviedo	77	(1)
2012–2013	Avilés	18	(0)
2013–2014	Compostela	8	(0)
2015–2016	Atlético Escairón	46	(7)
2016–2017	Lemos	15	(1)
2018–2019	Lalín	20	(3)
Total		494	(39)
- * Club domestic league appearances and goals

Jorge Eugenio Rodríguez Álvarez (born 11 August 1980) is a Spanish former professional footballer who played as a central defender.

== Club career ==
Born in Cee, Galicia, Rodríguez finished his development at RC Celta de Vigo's youth academy, and started his senior career with their reserves in the 1997–98 season. On 18 January 2003, he made his first-team – and La Liga – debut, starting in a 1–0 away loss against Real Sociedad.

In summer 2005, Rodríguez signed with Racing de Ferrol of Segunda División. He joined Segunda División B club Mérida UD six months later, and competed at the same level the following eight years, representing CD Ourense, Zamora CF, Pontevedra CF, Real Oviedo, Real Avilés Industrial CF and SD Compostela.
