= Jacobo Campos =

Spanish footballer

Personal information
- Full name: Jacobo Campos Piñeiro
- Date of birth: 15 March 1981 (age 45)
- Place of birth: Vigo, Spain
- Height: 1.76 m (5 ft 9 1/2 in)
- Position: Midfielder

Youth career
- Gran Peña
- 1993–1999: Celta

Senior career*
Years	Team	Apps	(Gls)
1999–2004	Celta B	70	(6)
1999–2000	→ Pontevedra (loan)	34	(4)
2000–2001	→ Compostela (loan)	25	(1)
2001–2002	Celta	1	(0)
2002	→ Leganés (loan)	9	(0)
2004–2006	Salamanca	53	(1)
2006–2007	Oviedo	34	(1)
2007–2008	Badalona	36	(0)
2008–2011	Coruxo		
Total		262	(13)

International career
1998	Spain U16	3	(0)
1998–1999	Spain U17	7	(1)
2000	Spain U18	2	(0)
2001	Spain U20	1	(0)
- * Club domestic league appearances and goals

Jacobo Campos Piñeiro (born 15 March 1981 in Vigo, Galicia) is a Spanish former footballer who played mainly as a left midfielder.

== Honours ==
Celta

- UEFA Intertoto Cup: 2000

Spain U17

- UEFA–CAF Meridian Cup: 1999
