= Jonathan Aspas =

Spanish footballer (born 1982)

Personal information
- Full name: Jonathan Aspas Juncal
- Date of birth: 28 February 1982 (age 44)
- Place of birth: Moaña, Spain
- Height: 1.77 m (5 ft 10 in)
- Position: Midfielder

Youth career
- 1990–1998: Moaña
- 1998–2001: Celta

Senior career*
| Years | Team | Apps | (Gls) |
| 2000–2004 | Celta B | 96 | (14) |
| 2000–2001 | → Pontevedra (loan) | 13 | (1) |
| 2003–2007 | Celta | 64 | (3) |
| 2007–2009 | Piacenza | 48 | (4) |
| 2009 | Mouscron | 15 | (2) |
| 2011 | AEP | 10 | (0) |
| 2011–2013 | Alki Larnaca | 52 | (3) |
| 2014–2015 | Racing Ferrol | 27 | (0) |
| 2015–2018 | Pro Piacenza | 97 | (0) |
| 2018–2020 | Nibbiano & Valtidone | 41 | (0) |
| Total | | 463 | (27) |

International career
| 1999 | Spain U16 | 9 | (2) |
| 1999 | Spain U17 | 3 | (1) |
| 1999–2000 | Spain U18 | 3 | (0) |
| 2002 | Spain U20 | 3 | (0) |
Medal record
Representing Spain
UEFA European Under-16 Championship
| Winner | 1999 Czech Republic |
- * Club domestic league appearances and goals

Jonathan Aspas Juncal (born 28 February 1982) is a Spanish former professional footballer. Mainly a right midfielder, he could also appear as a right-back.

== Club career ==
Born in Moaña, Province of Pontevedra, Aspas was brought up through local RC Celta de Vigo's youth system, and made his debut with the first team on 10 December 1999, aged 17, in a meaningless UEFA Cup tie against S.L. Benfica in Lisbon (Celta had already won 7–0 in the first leg, and he came on as a substitute for Benni McCarthy in the 1–1 draw). On 23 November 2003, his first La Liga game came, a 2–0 home loss against Athletic Bilbao. During that season, which ended in relegation, he also appeared in an infamous 5–0 derby defeat to Deportivo de La Coruña also at the Balaídos.

Subsequently, Aspas would be regularly used by the Galicians, while the club was again relegated from the top flight in 2007. He moved abroad afterwards, joining Italy's Piacenza Calcio 1919.

With the new technical staff of R.E. Mouscron – coach Miroslav Đukić and director of football Amedeo Carboni – playing a major part in his signing, Aspas moved to the Belgian Pro League for the 2009–10 campaign. However, after only four months, the club could not face surmounting financial problems, and folded.

Aspas resumed his career in the Cypriot First Division, with AEP Paphos FC and Alki Larnaca FC. In July 2014, he returned to his native region by signing for Segunda División B team Racing de Ferrol after a trial.

In the 2015 off-season, Aspas returned to Italy and the city of Piacenza, joining AS Pro Piacenza 1919. At the end of his contract, he moved to local amateurs ASD Nibbiano & Valtidone.

== Personal life ==
Aspas' younger brother, Iago, is also a footballer; both were developed at Celta. Their cousins Aitor Aspas, Raúl Blanco and Adrián Cruz were also involved in the sport.

== Career statistics ==
As of match played on 5 May 2018

Appearances and goals by club, season and competition
| Club | Season | League | | | Cup | | Continental | | Total | |
| Club | Season | Division | Apps | Goals | Apps | Goals | Apps | Goals | Apps | Goals |
|---|---|---|---|---|---|---|---|---|---|---|
| Celta | 1999–2000 | La Liga | 0 | 0 | 1 | 0 | 1 (Note: Appearances in UEFA Cup) | 0 | 2 | 0 |
| Celta | 2000–01 | La Liga | 0 | 0 | 0 | 0 | — | | 0 | 0 |
| Celta | 2003–04 | La Liga | 3 | 0 | 1 | 0 | — | | 4 | 0 |
| Celta | 2004–05 | Segunda División | 25 | 2 | 1 | 0 | — | | 26 | 2 |
| Celta | 2005–06 | La Liga | 15 | 1 | 3 | 0 | — | | 18 | 2 |
| Celta | 2006–07 | La Liga | 21 | 0 | 2 | 0 | 7 | 1 | 30 | 1 |
| Celta | Total | | 64 | 3 | 8 | 0 | 8 | 1 | 80 | 4 |
| Pontevedra (loan) | 2000–01 | Segunda División B | 13 | 1 | — | | — | | 13 | 1 |
| Piacenza | 2007–08 | Serie B | 19 | 2 | | | — | | 19 | 2 |
| Piacenza | 2008–09 | Serie B | 29 | 2 | | | — | | 29 | 2 |
| Piacenza | Total | | 48 | 4 | | | — | | 48 | 4 |
| Mouscron | 2009–10 | Belgian Pro League | 15 | 2 | 0 | 0 | — | | 15 | 2 |
| AEP | 2010–11 | Cypriot First Division | 10 | 0 | 0 | 0 | — | | 10 | 0 |
| Alki Larnaca | 2011–12 | Cypriot First Division | 28 | 0 | 4 | 0 | — | | 32 | 0 |
| Alki Larnaca | 2012–13 | Cypriot First Division | 24 | 3 | 0 | 0 | — | | 24 | 3 |
| Alki Larnaca | Total | | 52 | 3 | 4 | 0 | — | | 56 | 3 |
| Racing Ferrol | 2014–15 | Segunda División B | 27 | 0 | 2 | 0 | 3 (Note: Appearances in Segunda División B play-offs) | 0 | 32 | 0 |
| Piacenza | 2015–16 | Serie C | 30 | 0 | 0 | 0 | — | | 30 | 0 |
| Piacenza | 2016–17 | Serie C | 35 | 0 | 0 | 0 | — | | 35 | 0 |
| Piacenza | 2017–18 | Serie C | 32 | 0 | 1 | 0 | — | | 33 | 0 |
| Piacenza | Total | | 97 | 0 | 1 | 0 | — | | 98 | 0 |
| Career total | | | 326 | 13 | 15 | 0 | 11 | 1 | 352 | 14 |

== Honours ==
Celta

- UEFA Intertoto Cup: 2000

Spain U16

- UEFA European Under-16 Championship: 1999
