= 1997–98 Real Zaragoza season =

Real Zaragoza S.A.D.
1997–98 season
- Owner: Solans Family (64%)
- President: Alfonso Solans
- Head coach: Luis Costa
- Stadium: La Romareda
- La Liga: 10th
- Copa del Rey: Semifinals
- Top goalscorer: League: Pier (5 goals); All: Ander Garitano (7 goals)
Home colours	Away colours

The 1997–98 season was the 63rd season for Real Zaragoza in its history. The club competed in La Liga and Copa del Rey.

== Summary ==
During summer Alfonso Solans in his 6th season as President, reinforced the squad with several players such as midfielders Nordin Wooter from AFC Ajax, Jose Ignacio from Valencia CF, Roberto Acuña, Defender Gary Sundgren and forwards Yordi and Pier. Meanwhile, the club transferred out Gus Poyet to Chelsea FC after 7 years, youngstar forward Fernando Morientes and Dani were sold to Real Madrid. Also, forwards Higuera and Miguel Pardeza along Nayim left the club after several seasons.

In his 2nd season as head coach Luis Costa did fix the defensive line with decent performances of Sundgren, on the midfield the Dutch midfielder Nordin Wooter was a total flop being surpassed as starter by Jose Ignacio on the right wing, on the contrary, the other midfielders Kily Gonzalez, Santiago Aragon and Roberto Acuña did cover in a decent way the departures of Gus Poyet and Nayim. Costa found troubles at the offensive line with new arrivals Yordi and Pier delivering poor performances -prompting the arrival of Paulo Jamelli during Winter-, the team only reached the mid-table spots even far away to play the upcoming 1998 UEFA Intertoto Cup finishing in a 13th spot. The season is remembered by the match won by the squad against Real Madrid 0-2 at Santiago Bernabeu Stadium after 13 seasons only the 2nd league victory over there in its club history.

Meanwhile, in Copa del Rey the squad advanced to the semifinals only to be defeated by FC Barcelona.

== Squad ==
Note: Flags indicate national team as defined under FIFA eligibility rules; some limited exceptions apply. Players may hold more than one non-FIFA nationality.

No.	Pos.	Nation	Player
1	GK	ESP	Juanmi
2	DF	ESP	Alberto Belsué
3	DF	ESP	Jesús Solana
4	DF	ESP	Luis Cuartero
5	MF	ESP	Jesús García Sanjuan
6	DF	ESP	Xavier Aguado
7	MF	NED	Nordin Wooter
8	MF	ESP	Santiago Aragon
9	FW	ESP	Pier
10	MF	ESP	Ander Garitano
11	FW	ESP	Yordi
12	FW	BRA	Paulo Jamelli

No.	Pos.	Nation	Player
13	GK	ESP	José Belman
14	MF	ESP	Marcos Vales
15	DF	BRA	Gilmar
16	MF	ESP	José Ignacio
17	MF	RUS	Vladislav Radimov
18	MF	ARG	Kily Gonzalez
19	FW	ARG	Gustavo Adrián López
20	MF	PAR	Roberto Acuña
21	DF	ESP	Miquel Soler
22	DF	SWE	Kari Juhani Sundgren
22	MF	ESP	Iñigo Rodriguez
25	GK	AUT	Otto Konrad
26	FW	ESP	Jesús Seba
28	DF	ESP	Antonio García Torres
29	DF	ESP	Jose Angel Ferrera
31	DF	ESP	Javi Suárez
33	MF	ESP	Luis Helguera

=== Transfers ===
In
Pos.	Name	from	Type
DF	Gary Sundgren	AIK Fotboll	
MF	José Ignacio	Valencia CF	
MF	Roberto Acuña	CA Independiente	
FW	Pier	Real Betis	
FW	Yordi	Atlético Madrid	
MF	Nordin Wooter	AFC Ajax	
MF	Marcos Vales	Sporting de Gijón	

Out
Pos.	Name	To	Type
MF	Gus Poyet	Chelsea FC	
FW	Fernando Morientes	Real Madrid	
FW	Dani García	Real Madrid	loan ended
FW	Francisco Higuera		end of contract
MF	Nayim	Logroñes CF	
FW	Miguel Pardeza	Puebla FC	
DF	Quique Sanchez Flores		retired
MF	Oscar	Las Palmas	
FW	Loreto	Cordoba CF	
GK	Bosca	Talavera	

==== Winter ====
In
Pos.	Name	from	Type
FW	Paulo Jamelli	Kashiwa Reysol	

Out
Pos.	Name	To	Type

=== La Liga ===
==== League table ====
Pos	Team	Pld	W	D	L	GF	GA	GD	Pts
11	Valladolid	38	13	11	14	36	47	−11	50
12	Deportivo La Coruña	38	12	13	13	44	46	−2	49
13	Zaragoza	38	12	12	14	45	53	−8	48
14	Racing Santander	38	12	9	17	46	55	−9	45 (Note: RAC: 8 pts; SAL: 4 pts → SAL 2-0 TEN; TEN: 4 pts → TEN 2-0 SAL)
15	Salamanca	38	12	9	17	46	46	0	45

Source: LFP
Rules for classification: 1) points; 2) head-to-head points; 3) head-to-head goal difference; 4) head-to-head goals scored; 5) goal difference; 6) number of goals scored.

==== Position by round ====
Round	1	2	3	4	5	6	7	8	9	10	11	12	13	14	15	16	17	18	19	20	21	22	23	24	25	26	27	28	29	30	31	32	33	34	35	36	37	38
Ground	A	H	A	H	H	A	H	A	H	A	H	A	H	A	H	A	H	A	H	H	A	H	A	A	H	A	H	A	H	A	H	A	H	A	H	A	H	A
Result	L	D	W	D	D	D	L	W	D	L	L	W	W	W	L	W	D	L	D	W	L	D	L	W	W	L	D	W	L	L	D	D	L	L	W	W	D	L
Position	13	14	11	13	13	12	15	12	10	11	13	11	10	9	11	9	10	10	10	10	10	10	13	10	9	11	11	10	12	11	13	13	14	14	13	12	12	13

Source: https://www.bdfutbol.com/en/t/t1997-9839.html?tab=partits
A = Away; H = Home; W = Win; D = Draw; L = Loss; = Leader, 1998–99 UEFA Champions League Group stage; = 1998–99 UEFA Champions League Second Qualifying round; = 1998–99 UEFA Cup First round; = Qualification for the 1998 Intertoto Cup third round; = Qualification for the 1998 Intertoto Cup second round; = Qualification for the relegation playoff; = 1998–99 Segunda Division; R = 1998–99 UEFA Cup Winners' Cup

==== Matches ====
31 August 1997 1	Celta Vigo	2 – 1	Real Zaragoza	Vigo
	Karpin 76'; Salinas 87'	Report	55' González	Stadium: Balaídos; Referee: Victor José Esquinas Torres

7 September 1997 2	Real Zaragoza	3-3	Real Oviedo	Zaragoza
	Kily González 52'; Garitano 64' (pen.); Yordi 77'	Report	12' Pompei; 26' Pompei; 70' (pen.) González	Stadium: La Romareda; Referee: Pérez Lasa

14 September 1997 3	CP Mérida	0-1	Real Zaragoza	Mérida
		Report	44' (pen.) Garitano	Stadium: Romano; Referee: Díaz Vega

28 September 1997 4	Real Zaragoza	2-2	SD Compostela	Zaragoza
	Aguado 63'; Aguado 73'	Report	55' Bellido; 89' Ohen	Stadium: La Romareda; Referee: Ansuategui Roca

4 October 1997 5	Real Zaragoza	1-1	RCD Espanyol	Zaragoza
	Garitano 68' (pen.)	Report	84' Esnaider	Stadium: La Romareda

15 October 1997 6	Real Betis	3-3	Real Zaragoza	Sevilla
	Oli 28'; Oli 29'; Fernando 56'	Report	14' Acuña; 73' Aguado; 75' Garitano	Stadium: Benito Villamarin; Referee: Pérez Burrull

17 October 1997 7	Real Zaragoza	1-5	Atlético Madrid	Zaragoza
	Garitano 73' (pen.)	Report	3' Kiko; 19'Vieri; 39'Vieri; 63'Vieri; 82' Jose Mari	Stadium: La Romareda

26 October 1997 8	Salamanca	1-2	Real Zaragoza	Villares de la Reina
	Pauleta 21'	Report	24' Garitano; 62' Wooter	Stadium: El Helmántico; Referee: Megía Dávila

2 November 1997 9	Real Zaragoza	0-0	Real Sociedad	Zaragoza
		Report		Stadium: La Romareda; Referee: Puentes Leira

9 November 1997 10	Valencia CF	2-1	Real Zaragoza	Valencia
	Angloma 26'; Claudio Lopez 63'	Report	88' Kily González	Stadium: Mestalla; Referee: Carmona Méndez

12 November 1997 11	Real Zaragoza	1 – 2	Deportivo La Coruña	Zaragoza
	Yordi 51'; Gilmar (yellow card)	Report	17' Djalminha; 89' Fran; (yellow card) Bonnissel; (yellow card) Manjarín	Stadium: La Romareda; Referee: Eduardo Iturralde González

16 November 1997 12	Real Sporting	2–3	Real Zaragoza	Gijón
	Isma (yellow card) (yellow-red card) 77'; Luna 88'; Tomás 89'	Report	20', 50'Aragón; 22'Yordi	Stadium: El Molinón; Referee: Losantos Omar

23 November 1997 13	Real Zaragoza	1-0	CD Tenerife	Zaragoza
	Pier 67'	Report		Stadium: La Romareda; Referee: Mejuto Gonzalez

30 November 1997 14	RCD Mallorca	0-2	Real Zaragoza	Palma de Mallorca
		Report	Soler 37'; Kily González 89'	Stadium: Lluís Sitjar; Referee: Gil García

6 December 1997 15	Real Zaragoza	1-2	FC Barcelona	Zaragoza
	Aragón 54'	Report	17'Sergi; 30'Rivaldo	Stadium: La Romareda

14 December 1997 16	Racing Santander	2-3	Real Zaragoza	Santander
	Schürrer 44'; Beschastnykh 88'	Report	11' Belsue; 47' (pen.) Aragon; 86' Yordi	Stadium: El Sardinero; Referee: Japón Sevilla

17 December 1997 17	Real Zaragoza	2–2	Real Madrid	Zaragoza
	Sundgren 44'; Acuña 52'	Report	2'Raúl; 21'Guti	Stadium: La Romareda; Referee: Alfonso Burrull

21 December 1997 18	Real Valladolid	4-0	Real Zaragoza	Valladolid
	Víctor 24'; Peternac 50'; Júlio César 72'; García Calvo 84'	Report		Stadium: José Zorrilla; Referee: Puentes Leira

4 January 1998 19	Real Zaragoza	1-1	Athletic Bilbao	Zaragoza
	Radimov 69'	Report	32' Julen Guerrero	Stadium: La Romareda; Referee: Megía Dávila

11 January 1998 20	Real Zaragoza	1 – 0	Celta Vigo	Zaragoza
	Acuña 58'	Report		Stadium: La Romareda; Referee: Carmelo Rodríguez Martel

17 January 1998 21	Real Oviedo	3-0	Real Zaragoza	Oviedo
	Pompei 8'; Dubovský 41'; Pompei 50' (pen.)	Report		Stadium: Carlos Tartiere; Referee: Pérez Lasa

25 January 1998 22	Real Zaragoza	1-1	CP Mérida	Zaragoza
	Aragón 89' (pen.)		85' Cléber	Stadium: La Romareda; Referee: Megía Dávila

1 February 1998 23	SD Compostela	2-0	Real Zaragoza	Santiago de Compostela
	Ohen 58'; Penev 69'			Stadium: San Lázaro; Referee: Carmona Méndez

8 February 1998 24	RCD Espanyol	0-1	Real Zaragoza	Barcelona
			17' Kily González	Stadium: Olímpic; Referee: Japón Sevilla

15 February 1998 25	Real Zaragoza	3-1	Real Betis	Zaragoza
	Aguado 11'; Kily González 49'; Garitano 73' (pen.)	Report	17' Alfonso	Stadium: La Romareda; Referee: Iturralde González

22 February 1998 26	Atlético de Madrid	2-1	Real Zaragoza	Madrid
	Vieri 52'; Kiko 74'	Report	Miquel Soler 88'	Stadium: Estadio Vicente Calderón

1 March 1998 27	Real Zaragoza	1-1	Salamanca	Zaragoza
	Yordi 58'		42' Silvani	Stadium: La Romareda; Referee: Esquinas Torres

8 March 1998 28	Real Sociedad	0-1	Real Zaragoza	San Sebastián
			50' Belsue	Stadium: Anoeta; Referee: Fernández Marín

15 March 1998 29	Real Zaragoza	0-2	Valencia CF	Zaragoza
			72' Ilie; 89' Claudio López	Stadium: La Romareda; Referee: Díaz Vega

22 March 1998 30	Deportivo La Coruña	2 – 1	Real Zaragoza	A Coruña
	Conceição 8'; Bassir 66' (yellow card); Abreu (yellow card)	Report	80' Aguado; (yellow card) Sundgren	Stadium: Estadio Riazor; Referee: Juan Ansuátegui Roca

29 March 1998 31	Real Zaragoza	0–0	Sporting de Gijón	Zaragoza
	Gilmar (yellow card) (yellow-red card) 34'	Summary		Stadium: La Romareda; Referee: López Nieto

5 April 1998 32	CD Tenerife	0-0	Real Zaragoza	Santa Cruz de Tenerife
				Stadium: Heliodoro Rodríguez

12 April 1998 33	Real Zaragoza	2-3	RCD Mallorca	Zaragoza
	Jamelli 50'; Jamelli 58'		9' Ezquerro; 62' Ezquerro; 78' Mena	Stadium: La Romareda; Referee: López de la Fuente

18 April 1998 34	FC Barcelona	1-0	Real Zaragoza	Barcelona
	Giovanni 77'	Report		Stadium: Camp Nou

26 April 1998 35	Real Zaragoza	2-0	Racing Santander	Zaragoza
	Radimov 19'; Jamelli 46'			Stadium: La Romareda; Referee: Asurmendi

4 May 1998 36	Real Madrid	0–2	Real Zaragoza	Madrid
		Report	Jamelli 57'; Gustavo Lopez 79'	Stadium: Santiago Bernabeu; Referee: Jose Omar

10 May 1998 37	Real Zaragoza	0-0	Real Valladolid	Zaragoza
				Stadium: La Romareda

15 May 1998 38	Athletic Bilbao	1-0	Real Zaragoza	Bilbao
	Etxeberria 40'			Stadium: San Mamés

=== Copa del Rey ===
==== Eightfinals ====
14 January 1998	Real Zaragoza	2-0	Atlético Madrid	Zaragoza
		Report		Stadium: Estadio La Romareda

20 January 1998	Atlético Madrid	2-1 (3-2 agg.)	Real Zaragoza	Madrid
		Report		Stadium: Estadio Vicente Calderón

==== Quarterfinals ====
4 February 1998	Real Zaragoza	3-0	Real Betis	Zaragoza
		Report		Stadium: La Romareda

12 February 1998	Real Betis	2–2 (2-5 agg.)	Real Zaragoza	Sevilla
21:30 CET	Alfonso 43'; Finidi 64'	Report (in Spanish)	Jamelli 15'; Pier 17'	Stadium: Benito Villamarín; Attendance: 30,000; Referee: Fernández Marín (Valencian Community)

==== Semifinals ====
18 February 1998	FC Barcelona	5-2	Real Zaragoza	Barcelona
20:30	Rivaldo 3' 6' 47'; Giovanni 11'; Enrique 20'		Garitano 1' 40'	Stadium: Camp Nou; Attendance: 45,000; Referee: Antonio López Nieto

26 February 1998	Real Zaragoza	0–0	FC Barcelona	Zaragoza
21:00				Stadium: La Romareda; Attendance: 34,000; Referee: Manuel Díaz Vega

== Statistics ==
=== Players statistics ===
No.	Pos	Nat	Player	Total		La Liga		Copa del Rey	
No.	Pos	Nat	Player	Apps	Goals	Apps	Goals	Apps	Goals
1	GK	(Spain) ESP	Juanmi	36	-43	31	-37	5	-6
2	DF	(Spain) ESP	Alberto Belsué	36	2	28+1	2	7	0
6	DF	(Spain) ESP	Xavier Aguado	41	6	31	5	9+1	1
15	DF	(Brazil) BRA	Gilmar	31	0	21+4	0	6	0
22	DF	(Sweden) SWE	Sundgren	36	1	30+1	1	5	0
8	MF	(Spain) ESP	Santi Aragon	36	6	20+6	5	6+4	1
20	MF	(Paraguay) PAR	Roberto Acuña	37	4	30	3	7	1
16	MF	(Spain) ESP	José Ignacio	41	4	32+1	0	8	4
18	MF	(Argentina) ARG	Kily Gonzalez	38	7	28+3	6	6+1	1
9	FW	(Spain) ESP	Pier	37	6	22+8	1	6+1	5
19	FW	(Argentina) ARG	Gustavo Adrián López	27	3	13+9	1	3+2	2
25	GK	(Austria) AUT	Otto Konrad	12	-24	7	-16	5	-8
3	DF	(Spain) ESP	Jesús Solana	32	0	22+2	0	6+2	0
21	DF	(Spain) ESP	Miquel Soler	30	2	17+7	2	5+1	0
12	FW	(Brazil) BRA	Paulo Jamelli	21	5	16	4	4+1	1
11	FW	(Spain) ESP	Yordi	39	5	14+16	5	4+5	0
10	MF	(Spain) ESP	Ander Garitano	23	10	14+4	7	3+2	3
17	MF	(Russia) RUS	Vladislav Radimov	32	2	13+11	2	7+1	0
14	MF	(Spain) ESP	Marcos Vales	28	1	12+11	0	4+1	1
4	DF	(Spain) ESP	Luis Cuartero	20	0	11+4	0	3+2	0
7	MF	(Netherlands) NED	Nordin Wooter	15	1	5+9	1	1	0
5	MF	(Spain) ESP	Jesús García Sanjuan	4	0	1+2	0	0+1	0
13	GK	(Spain) ESP	José Belman	0	0	0	0		
22	MF	(Spain) ESP	Iñigo Rodriguez	2	0	0+1	0	0+1	0
26	FW	(Spain) ESP	Jesús Seba	0	0	0	0	0	0
28	DF	(Spain) ESP	Antonio García Torres	1	0	0+1	0		
29	DF	(Spain) ESP	Jose Angel Ferrera	1	0	0+1	0		
31	DF	(Spain) ESP	Javi Suárez	2	0	1+1	0		
33	MF	(Spain) ESP	Luis Helguera	1	0	1	0		
	FW	(Spain) ESP	Javi Peña	2	0	0	0	0+2	0

- Source: https://www.bdfutbol.com/en/t/t1997-9839.html
