= 1998–99 Real Zaragoza season =

Real Zaragoza
1998–99 season
- President: Alfonso Soláns
- Head coach: Chechu Rojo
- Stadium: La Romareda
- La Liga: 9th
- Copa del Rey: Third round
- Top goalscorer: League: Savo Milošević (17); All: Savo Milošević (17)
Home colours	Away colours	Third colours

The 1998–99 season was the 67th in the history of Real Zaragoza and their 21st consecutive season in the second division. The club participated in La Liga and the Copa del Rey.

== Players ==
Note: Flags indicate national team as defined under FIFA eligibility rules; some limited exceptions apply. Players may hold more than one non-FIFA nationality.

No.	Pos.	Nation	Player
1	GK	ESP	Juanmi
2	DF	ESP	Alberto Belsué
3	DF	ESP	Jesús Solana
4	DF	ESP	Luis Carlos Cuartero
5	DF	BRA	Gilmar
6	DF	ESP	Xavier Aguado
7	FW	NED	Nordin Wooter
8	MF	ESP	Santiago Aragon
9	FW	YUG	Savo Milosevic
10	MF	ESP	Ander Garitano
11	MF	ESP	Yordi
12	FW	BRA	Paulo Jamelli

No.	Pos.	Nation	Player
13	GK	ESP	Cesar Lainez
14	MF	ESP	Jose Ignacio
16	DF	ARG	Pablo Diaz
17	MF	RUS	Vladislav Radimov
18	MF	ARG	Kily González
19	FW	ARG	Gustavo Adrián López
20	MF	PAR	Roberto Acuña
21	FW	ESP	Javi Peña
22	DF	SWE	Kari Sundgren
23	DF	ESP	Paco Jemez
24	MF	ESP	Marcos Vales
25	GK	COL	Faryd Mondragon
27	MF	ESP	Luis Helguera

=== Transfers ===
In
Pos.	Name	from	Type
FW	Savo Milosevic	Aston Villa	
DF	Pablo Diaz	Sporting Gijon	
DF	Paco Jemez	Deportivo La Coruña	
GK	Faryd Mondragon	CA Independiente	

Out
Pos.	Name	To	Type
DF	Miquel Soler	RCD Mallorca	
GK	José Belman	Hercules CF	
MF	Jesús García Sanjuan	Villarreal CF	
DF	Javi Suarez	CD Numancia	
FW	Jesús Seba	CD Chaves	
GK	Otto Konrad	Grazer AK	
FW	Pier	CD Tenerife	
DF	Alberto Belsué	Deportivo Alavés	

== Competitions ==
=== Overall record ===
Competition	First match	Last match	Starting round	Final position	Record							
Competition	First match	Last match	Starting round	Final position	Pld	W	D	L	GF	GA	GD	Win %
La Liga	30 August 1998	20 June 1999	Matchday 1	9th	38	16	9	13	57	46	+11	42.11
Copa del Rey	September 1998	September 1998	Third round	Third round	2	0	2	0	3	3	+0	0.00
Total					40	16	11	13	60	49	+11	40.00

Source: Competitions

=== La Liga ===
==== League table ====
Pos	Team	Pld	W	D	L	GF	GA	GD	Pts	Qualification or relegation
7	Espanyol	38	16	13	9	49	38	+11	61	Qualification for the Intertoto Cup third round
8	Athletic Bilbao (Note: Despite being qualified and registered, Athletic Bilbao refused to play Intertoto)	38	17	9	12	53	47	+6	60	
9	Zaragoza	38	16	9	13	57	46	+11	57	
10	Real Sociedad	38	14	12	12	47	43	+4	54	
11	Real Betis	38	14	7	17	47	58	−11	49	

Source: LFP
Rules for classification: 1) points; 2) head-to-head points; 3) head-to-head goal difference; 4) head-to-head goals scored; 5) goal difference; 6) number of goals scored.

==== Results summary ====
Overall								Home						Away					
Pld	W	D	L	GF	GA	GD	Pts	W	D	L	GF	GA	GD	W	D	L	GF	GA	GD
38	16	9	13	57	46	+11	57	11	3	5	35	21	+14	5	6	8	22	25	−3

Source: La Liga

==== Results by round ====
Round	1	2	3	4	5	6	7	8	9	10	11	12	13	14	15	16	17	18	19	20	21	22	23	24	25	26	27	28	29	30	31	32	33	34	35	36	37	38
Ground	H	A	A	H	A	H	A	H	A	H	A	H	A	H	A	H	A	H	A	A	H	H	A	H	A	H	A	H	A	H	A	H	A	H	A	H	A	H
Result	W	W	L	W	W	L	L	L	W	L	D	W	D	L	D	W	D	W	L	L	D	D	W	W	L	L	D	W	L	D	W	W	L	W	L	W	D	W
Position	2	2	4	3	1	2	5	8	6	9	9	8	7	9	11	9	9	8	10	12	12	13	10	9	9	9	9	8	9	10	9	7	9	8	10	10	9	9

Source: https://www.worldfootball.net/competition/ro11027/md38/results-and-standings/
A = Away; H = Home; W = Win; D = Draw; L = Loss; = Leader, 1999–2000 UEFA Champions League group stage; = 1999–2000 UEFA Champions League group stage; = 1999–2000 UEFA Champions League qualifying round; = 1999–2000 UEFA Cup; = 1999 UEFA Intertoto Cup; = 1999–2000 Segunda División

==== Matches ====
30 August 1998 1	Zaragoza	2–0	Athletic Bilbao	Zaragoza
--:-- CEST (UTC+2)				Stadium: La Romareda

12 September 1998 2	Real Betis	1–3	Zaragoza	Seville
--:-- CEST (UTC+2)				Stadium: Manuel Ruiz de Lopera

20 September 1998 3	Alavés	1–0	Zaragoza	Vitoria-Gasteiz
--:-- CEST (UTC+2)				Stadium: Mendizorrotza

27 September 1998 4	Zaragoza	3–1	Racing Santander	Zaragoza
--:-- CEST (UTC+2)				Stadium: La Romareda

4 October 1998 5	Extremadura	0–2	Zaragoza	Almendralejo
--:-- CEST (UTC+2)				Stadium: Estadio Francisco de la Hera

17 October 1998 6	Zaragoza	3–4	Real Madrid	Zaragoza
--:-- CEST (UTC+2)				Stadium: La Romareda

24 October 1998 7	Celta Vigo	2–0	Zaragoza	Vigo
--:-- CEST (UTC+2)				Stadium: Estadio Balaídos

31 October 1998 8	Zaragoza	1–4	Valencia	Zaragoza
--:-- CEST (UTC+2)				Stadium: La Romareda

8 November 1998 9	Salamanca	1–2	Zaragoza	Villares de la Reina
--:-- CET (UTC+1)				Stadium: Helmántico

15 November 1998 10	Zaragoza	0–3	Espanyol	Zaragoza
--:-- CEST (UTC+2)				Stadium: La Romareda

21 November 1998 11	Real Sociedad	0–0	Zaragoza	San Sebastián
--:-- CET (UTC+1)				Stadium: Anoeta

29 November 1998 12	Zaragoza	1–0	Oviedo	Zaragoza
--:-- CEST (UTC+2)				Stadium: La Romareda

6 December 1998 13	Tenerife	1–1	Zaragoza	Santa Cruz de Tenerife
--:-- CET (UTC+1)				Stadium: Heliodoro Rodríguez López

13 December 1998 14	Zaragoza	0–1	Mallorca	Zaragoza
--:-- CEST (UTC+2)				Stadium: La Romareda

20 December 1998 15	Atlético Madrid	0–0	Zaragoza	Madrid
--:-- CET (UTC+1)				Stadium: Vicente Calderón

3 January 1999 16	Zaragoza	3–1	Deportivo La Coruña	Zaragoza
--:-- CEST (UTC+2)				Stadium: La Romareda

10 January 1999 17	Villarrreal	1–1	Zaragoza	Villarreal
--:-- CET (UTC+1)				Stadium: El Madrigal

17 January 1999 18	Zaragoza	2–0	Valladolid	Zaragoza
--:-- CEST (UTC+2)				Stadium: La Romareda

24 January 1999 19	Barcelona	3–1	Zaragoza	Barcelona
--:-- CET (UTC+1)				Stadium: Camp Nou

30 January 1999 20	Athletic Bilbao	2–0	Zaragoza	Bilbao
--:-- CET (UTC+1)				Stadium: San Mamés

7 February 1999 21	Zaragoza	2–2	Real Betis	Zaragoza
--:-- CEST (UTC+2)				Stadium: La Romareda

14 February 1999 22	Zaragoza	1–1	Alavés	Zaragoza
--:-- CEST (UTC+2)				Stadium: La Romareda

20 February 1999 23	Racing Santander	2–4	Zaragoza	Santander
--:-- CET (UTC+1)				Stadium: El Sardinero

28 February 1999 24	Zaragoza	3–1	Extremadura	Zaragoza
--:-- CET (UTC+1)				Stadium: La Romareda

13 March 1999 26	Zaragoza	0–1	Celta Vigo	Zaragoza
--:-- CET (UTC+1)				Stadium: La Romareda

4 April 1999 28	Zaragoza	2–0	Salamanca	Zaragoza
--:-- CEST (UTC+2)				Stadium: La Romareda

11 April 1999 29	Espanyol	2–1	Zaragoza	Barcelona
--:-- CEST (UTC+2)				Stadium: Estadi Olímpic de Montjuïc

18 April 1999 30	Zaragoza	1–1	Real Sociedad	Zaragoza
--:-- CEST (UTC+2)				Stadium: La Romareda

25 April 1999 31	Oviedo	1–2	Zaragoza	Oviedo
--:-- CEST (UTC+2)				Stadium: Carlos Tartiere

2 May 1999 32	Zaragoza	3–1	Tenerife	Zaragoza
--:-- CEST (UTC+2)				Stadium: La Romareda

9 May 1999 33	Mallorca	1–0	Zaragoza	Palma
--:-- CEST (UTC+2)				Stadium: Lluis Sitjar

16 May 1999 34	Zaragoza	2–0	Atlético Madrid	Zaragoza
--:-- CEST (UTC+2)				Stadium: La Romareda

23 May 1999 35	Deportivo La Coruña	2–1	Zaragoza	A Coruña
--:-- CEST (UTC+2)				Stadium: Riazor

30 May 1999 36	Zaragoza	4–0	Villarreal	Zaragoza
--:-- CEST (UTC+2)				Stadium: La Romareda

12 June 1999 37	Valladolid	1–1	Zaragoza	Valladolid
--:-- CEST (UTC+2)				Stadium: José Zorrilla

20 June 1999 38	Zaragoza	2–0	Barcelona	Zaragoza
--:-- CEST (UTC+2)				Stadium: La Romareda

=== Copa del Rey ===
Zaragoza entered the competition in the third round.

28 October 1998 First leg	Sporting de Gijón	1–1	Zaragoza	Gijón
--:-- CEST (UTC+2)

11 November 1998 Second leg	Zaragoza	2–2 (3–3 agg.)	Sporting de Gijón	Zaragoza
--:-- CEST (UTC+2)				Stadium: La Romareda

== Statistics ==
=== Players statistics ===
No.	Pos	Nat	Player	Total		1998-99 La Liga		1998-99 Copa del Rey	
No.	Pos	Nat	Player	Apps	Goals	Apps	Goals	Apps	Goals
1	GK	(Spain) ESP	Juanmi	25	-27	25	-27		
16	DF	(Argentina) ARG	Pablo Diaz	34	1	29+3	1	2	0
6	DF	(Spain) ESP	Xavier Aguado	37	4	36	4	1	0
23	DF	(Spain) ESP	Paco Jemez	39	0	37	0	2	0
22	DF	(Sweden) SWE	Kari Sundgren	26	0	25	0	1	0
24	MF	(Spain) ESP	Marcos Vales	36	6	29+5	6	0+2	0
8	MF	(Spain) ESP	Santi Aragon	33	3	22+10	3	0+1	0
20	MF	(Paraguay) PAR	Roberto Acuña	33	2	29+2	2	2	0
14	MF	(Spain) ESP	Jose Ignacio	32	1	22+9	1	0+1	0
18	MF	(Argentina) ARG	Kily González	30	6	29	6	1	0
9	FW	(Federal Republic of Yugoslavia) YUG	Savo Milosevic	37	18	35	17	2	1
25	GK	(Colombia) COL	Faryd Mondragon	13	-19	13	-19		
19	FW	(Argentina) ARG	Gustavo Adrián López	34	6	18+14	5	2	1
3	DF	(Spain) ESP	Jesús Solana	20	0	15+4	0	1	0
10	MF	(Spain) ESP	Ander Garitano	20	1	15+4	1	0+1	0
12	FW	(Brazil) BRA	Paulo Jamelli	24	5	15+8	4	0+1	1
11	MF	(Spain) ESP	Yordi	17	5	9+7	5	0+1	0
4	DF	(Spain) ESP	Luis Carlos Cuartero	13	0	11+2	0		
7	FW	(Netherlands) NED	Nordin Wooter	20	0	2+16	0	2	0
27	MF	(Spain) ESP	Luis Helguera	3	0	2+1	0		
2	DF	(Spain) ESP	Alberto Belsué	2	0	0+1	0	1	0
5	DF	(Brazil) BRA	Gilmar	1	0	0+1	0		
13	GK	(Spain) ESP	Cesar Lainez	0	0	0	0	0	0
17	MF	(Russia) RUS	Vladislav Radimov	5	0	0+4	0	1	0
21	FW	(Spain) ESP	Javi Peña	2	0	0+2	0		
25	GK	(Austria) AUT	Otto Konrad	2	-3	0	0	2	-3
30	GK	(Spain) ESP	Moso	0	0	0	0		
28	DF	(Spain) ESP	Jose Angel	0	0	0	0		

- Source: https://www.bdfutbol.com/en/t/t1998-9939.html
