= 1995–96 Club Atlético Boca Juniors season =

Boca Juniors football season

Boca Juniors
1995–96 season
- President: Antonio Alegre (until 12 December 1995); Mauricio Macri
- Manager: Silvio Marzolini (until 16 December 1995); Carlos Bilardo
- Stadium: Estadio Camilo Cichero (La Bombonera)
- Apertura Tournament: 4th
- Clausura Tournament: 5th
- Top goalscorer: League: All: Caniggia (12)
Home colours	Away colours

The 1995–96 Club Atlético Boca Juniors season was the 66th consecutive Primera División season played by the senior squad.

== Summary ==
The campaign is best remembered by the high-expected return to the club of 1986 World Cup champion Diego Maradona after 14 seasons. Several players were transferred in included Rosario Central left winger Kily González almost signed by Real Madrid, Darío Scotto, Claudio Paul Caniggia, Arturo Yorno and loans out ended for Raul Peralta, Roberto Cabañas y Blas Giunta.

On 3 December 1995 Mauricio Macri won his first chairman's election with 7,000 votes and became new club president In Torneo Apertura 1995 the squad finished on 4th spot after several rounds being leader losing the title over the last 5 matches.

Marzolini was sacked and Macri signed Carlos Bilardo during December 1995, and reinforced the squad with midfielders Juan Sebastián Verón from Estudiantes La Plata and José Horacio Basualdo. The Clausura is best remembered by the bizarre fact of 5 penalties missed by Maradona. The club finished on 5th spot with 33 points, seven below of champions Carlos Bianchi' Velez Sarsfield.

== Squad ==
Note: Flags indicate national team as defined under FIFA eligibility rules; some limited exceptions apply. Players may hold more than one non-FIFA nationality.

No.	Pos.	Nation	Player
—	GK	COL	Carlos Navarro Montoya
—	GK	ARG	Arturo Yorno
—	DF	ARG	Fernando Gamboa
—	DF	ARG	Luis Medero
—	DF	ARG	Carlos Mac Allister
—	DF	ARG	Nelson Vivas
—	DF	ARG	Néstor Fabbri
—	DF	ARG	Diego Soñora
—	DF	ARG	Julio Saldaña
—	DF	ARG	Rodolfo Arruabarrena
—	MF	ARG	Kily González
—	MF	ARG	Diego Maradona
—	MF	ARG	Juan Sebastián Verón

No.	Pos.	Nation	Player
—	MF	ARG	Walter Pico
—	MF	ARG	Fabián Carrizo
—	MF	ARG	Alberto Márcico
—	MF	ARG	Christian Giménez
—	MF	ARG	José Basualdo
—	MF	ARG	Raúl Peralta
—	MF	ARG	Blas Giunta
—	FW	ARG	Claudio Caniggia
—	FW	URU	Sergio Daniel Martínez
—	FW	CMR	Alphonse Tchami
—	FW	ARG	Darío Scotto
—	FW	ARG	Luis Darío Calvo
—	FW	ARG	Roberto Oscar Gómez

=== Transfers ===
In
Pos.	Name	from	Type
FW	Diego Maradona		Free
MF	Kily González	Rosario Central	
FW	Claudio Paul Caniggia	Benfica	
FW	Darío Scotto	Rosario Central	
GK	Arturo Yorno	Rosario Central	
DF	Raul Peralta		loan ended
DF	Roberto Cabañas		loan ended
DF	Blas Giunta		loan ended

==== January ====
In
Pos.	Name	from	Type
MF	Juan Sebastián Verón	Estudiantes La Plata	
MF	José Horacio Basualdo	Velez Sarsfield	

Out
Pos.	Name	To	Type
DF	Soñora		
MF	Marcico	Gimnasia y Esgrima de La Plata	

== Competitions ==
=== Torneo Apertura ===
==== League table ====
Pos	Team	Pld	W	D	L	GF	GA	GD	Pts
2	Racing	19	10	5	4	35	24	+11	35
3	Lanús	19	9	6	4	25	16	+9	33
4	Boca Juniors	19	9	5	5	27	19	+8	32
5	San Lorenzo	19	9	5	5	30	24	+6	32
6	Huracán	20	8	6	6	25	22	+3	30

Pos	Team	Pld	W	D	L	GF	GA	GD	Pts
1	Vélez Sársfield	19	11	7	1	40	18	+22	40
2	Gimnasia y Esgrima (LP)	19	12	3	4	44	21	+23	39
3	Lanús	19	10	4	5	35	24	+11	34
4	Estudiantes (LP)	19	9	7	3	33	22	+11	34
5	Boca Juniors	19	10	3	6	30	26	+4	33
6	Rosario Central	19	8	6	5	33	23	+10	30
7	Huracán	19	7	8	4	32	29	+3	29
8	Racing	19	8	5	6	26	25	+1	29
9	Colón	19	7	5	7	20	21	−1	26
10	Ferro Carril Oeste	19	6	8	5	16	20	−4	26
11	Deportivo Español	19	5	9	5	19	19	0	24
12	Independiente	19	5	8	6	22	26	−4	23
13	Belgrano	19	6	4	9	23	26	−3	22
14	River Plate	19	6	3	10	32	33	−1	21
15	Platense	19	6	3	10	23	29	−6	21
16	Gimnasia y Esgrima (J)	19	6	3	10	22	37	−15	21
17	Newell's Old Boys	19	3	9	7	20	28	−8	18
18	Banfield	19	4	5	10	20	25	−5	17
19	San Lorenzo	19	4	4	11	15	29	−14	16
20	Argentinos Juniors	19	3	4	12	12	36	−24	13

==== Position by round ====
Round	1	2	3	4	5	6	7	8	9	10	11	12	13	14	15	16	17	18	19
Ground	A	H	A	H	A	H	H	H	A	H	A	H	A	A	H	A	H	A	H
Result	W	W	W	D	D	D	D	W	W	W	D	W	W	W	D	D	L	L	D
Position	13	4	4	4	6	8	7	8	7	6	3	1	1	1	1	1	2	3	4

Source: www.afa.ar
A = Away; H = Home; W = Win; D = Draw; L = Loss

==== Matches ====
18 October 1995 1	Gimnasia y Esgrima (J)	1-2	Boca Juniors	San Salvador de Jujuy
	Mac Allister 52' (own goal)	Report	Carrizo (red card) 32'; Scotto 44'; Peralta 65'; Maradona (yellow card); Tchami (yellow card); Giunta (yellow card)	Stadium: Estadio 23 de Agosto; Referee: Castrilli

13 August 1995 2	Boca Juniors	2-1	Club Atlético Huracán	La Boca
	Giuntini (red card) 29'; Guerra 77'	Report	Manteca Martinez 30' (pen.); Marcico (red card) 44'; Darío Scotto 90'; Mac Allister (yellow card); Kily González (yellow card)	Stadium: Estadio Alberto Cichero (La Bombonera); Referee: Ruscio

18 August 1995 3	Platense	0-1	Boca Juniors	Liniers
	Maisterra (yellow card) 85' (yellow-red card)	Report	Tchami 70'; Mac Allister (yellow card); Kily González (yellow card); Manteca Martinez (yellow card)	Stadium: José Amalfitani; Referee: Elizondo

27 August 1995 4	Boca Juniors	2-2	Ferro Carril Oeste	La Boca
	Tchami 44'; Vivas 68'; Vivas (yellow card); Giunta (yellow card)	Report	Mandrini 18'; Vargas 82'	Stadium: Estadio Alberto Cichero (La Bombonera); Referee: Bava

2 September 1995 5	Lanús	1-1	Boca Juniors	Avellaneda
	Schurrer (penalty missed) 11'; Loza (red card) 40'; Gamboa 68' (own goal)	Report	Fabbri 59'; Vivas (yellow card); Gamboa (yellow card); Mac Allister (yellow card); Kily González (yellow card); Walter Pico (yellow card)	Stadium: La Doble Visera; Referee: Ruscio

10 September 1995 6	Boca Juniors	1-1	Newell's Old Boys	La Boca
	Caniggia 24'; Fabbri (yellow card)	Report	Gabrich 79'	Stadium: Estadio Alberto Cichero (La Bombonera); Referee: Cordero

24 September 1995 7	Boca Juniors	0-0	Independiente	Buenos Aires
	Carrizo (yellow card); Caniggia (yellow card); Marcico (yellow card) 86' (yellow-red card)	Report		Stadium: Estadio Alberto Cichero (La Bombonera); Referee: Castrilli

7 October 1995 9	Boca Juniors	1-0	Colon	La Boca
	Scotto 89'	Report	Toresani (red card) 38'	Stadium: Estadio Alberto Cichero (La Bombonera); Referee: Lamolina

15 October 1995 10	Argentinos Juniors	0-1	Boca Juniors	Liniers
		Report	Maradona 70'; Gamboa (yellow card); Carrizo (yellow card)	Stadium: Estadio José Amalfitani; Referee: Cordero

22 October 1995 11	Boca Juniors	0-0	San Lorenzo	La Boca
	Soñora (yellow card); Giunta (yellow card); Maradona (yellow card); Caniggia (yellow card)	Report		Stadium: Estadio Alberto Cichero (La Bombonera); Referee: Crespi

28 October 1995 12	Belgrano (Córdoba)	0-1	Boca Juniors	Córdoba
	Avalos (yellow card) 89' (yellow-red card)	Report	Manteca Martinez 32'; Fabbri (yellow card); Peralta (yellow card)	Stadium: El Gigante de Alberdi; Referee: Marconi

5 November 1995 13	Boca Juniors	1-0	Velez Sarsfield	La Boca
	Scotto 36'; Gamboa (yellow card)	Report		Stadium: Estadio Alberto Cichero (La Bombonera); Referee: Castrilli

9 November 1995 8	Gimnasia y Esgrima (LP)	0-1	Boca Juniors	Buenos Aires
		Report	Scotto 37'; Gamboa (yellow card); Fabbri (yellow card)	Stadium: Estadio José Amalfitani; Referee: Elizondo

12 November 1995 14	Banfield	0-2	Boca Juniors	Avellaneda
		Report	Scotto 25'; Caniggia 73'; Medero (yellow card); Carrizo (yellow card); Maradona (yellow card)	Stadium: La Doble Visera; Referee: Cordero

17 November 1995 15	Boca Juniors	0-0	Rosario Central	La Boca
	Gamboa (yellow card)	Report		Stadium: Estadio Alberto Cichero (La Bombonera); Referee: Mastrangelo

26 November 1995 16	River Plate	0-0	Boca Juniors	Nuñez
	Astrada (red card) 40'	Report	Gamboa (yellow card) 81' (yellow-red card); Soñora (yellow card); Fabbri (yellow card); Saldaña (yellow card); Carrizo (yellow card); Maradona (yellow card)	Stadium: Monumental; Referee: Ruscio

3 December 1995 17	Boca Juniors	4-6	Racing Club	La Boca
	Mac Allister 30'; Giunta (red card) 35'; Maradona 44' (pen.); Manteca Martinez 78'; Scotto 89'	Report	Capria 4'; Delgado 11'; Piojo Lopez 14'; Zanetti (red card) 21'; Capria 48'; Capria 60'; Piojo López 86'	Stadium: Estadio Alberto J. Armando (La Bombonera); Referee: Castrilli

9 December 1995 18	Estudiantes La Plata	2-1	Boca Juniors	Avellaneda
	París (red card) 5'; Palermo (red card) 30'; Pratola 44'; Maciel 88'	Report	Fabbri 26'; Navarro Montoya (red card) 30'; Carrizo 68'; Gamboa (yellow card) 89' (yellow-red card); Fabbri (yellow card); Kily González (yellow card); Manteca Martinez (yellow card)	Stadium: La Doble Visera; Referee: Crespi

16 December 1995 19	Boca Juniors	2-2	Deportivo Español	La Boca
	Galvan 47'; Odriozola 51'	Report	Maradona 53' (pen.); Manteca Martinez 68'; Arruabarrena (yellow card) 74' (yellow-red card); Kily González (yellow card); Maradona (yellow card)	Stadium: Estadio Alberto Cichero (La Bombonera); Referee: A. Sanchez

=== Torneo Clausura ===
==== League table ====
Pos	Team	Pld	W	D	L	GF	GA	GD	Pts
3	Lanús	19	10	4	5	35	24	+11	34
4	Estudiantes (LP)	19	9	7	3	33	22	+11	34
5	Boca Juniors	19	10	3	6	30	26	+4	33
6	Rosario Central	19	8	6	5	33	23	+10	30
7	Huracán	19	7	8	4	32	29	+3	29

==== Position by round ====
Round	1	2	3	4	5	6	7	8	9	10	11	12	13	14	15	16	17	18	19
Ground	H	A	H	A	H	A	A	H	A	H	A	H	A	H	A	H	A	H	A
Result	W	D	W	W	W	L	D	L	L	W	W	W	L	W	W	W	L	L	D
Position	1	2	1	1	1	2	4	5	6	5	5	5	7	6	5	4	4	5	5

Source: www.afa.com.ar
A = Away; H = Home; W = Win; D = Draw; L = Loss

==== Matches ====
8 March 1996 1	Boca Juniors	4-0	Gimnasia y Esgrima (J)	Liniers
	Maradona 2' (pen.); Peralta 5'; Manteca Martinez 64'; Kily González (yellow card) 72' (yellow-red card); Vivas 78'	Report	Pages (yellow card) 56' (yellow-red card)	Stadium: Estadio Jose Amalfitani; Referee: Gimenez

17 March 1996 2	Huracan	1-1	Boca Juniors	Parque Patricios
	Guerra 90'	Report	Medero (yellow card); Veron 85'	Stadium: Tomas Adolfo Duco; Referee: A. Sanchez

24 March 1996 3	Boca Juniors	1-0	Platense	Liniers
	Caniggia 16'	Report		Stadium: Estadio Jose Amalfitani; Referee: Castrilli

31 March 1996 4	Ferro Carril Oeste	1-2	Boca Juniors	Liniers
	Sava 47'	Report	Caniggia 11'; Kily González 33'; Mac Allister (yellow card)	Stadium: Estadio Jose Amalfitani; Referee: Cordero

7 April 1996 5	Boca Juniors	2-1	Lanús	Liniers
	Caniggia 20'; Caniggia 70'; Navarro Montoya (yellow card); Maradona (yellow card); Scotto (yellow card)	Report	Ibagaza 62'	Stadium: Estadio Jose Amalfitani; Referee: Ruscio

13 April 1996 6	Newell's Old Boys	1-0	Boca Juniors	Rosario
	Franco 24'	Report	Maradona (penalty missed) 22'; Gamboa (red card) 38'; Fabbri (yellow card); Carrizo (yellow card); Caniggia (yellow card); Vivas (yellow card)	Stadium: Estadio El Gigante de Arroyito; Referee: Gimenez

28 April 1996 7	Independiente	1-1	Boca Juniors	Avellaneda
	José Luis Calderon 12'	Report	Manteca Martinez 16'; Navarro Montoya (yellow card); Carrizo (yellow card); Scotto (yellow card); Manteca Martinez (yellow card)	Stadium: Estadio Libertadores de América; Referee: Castrilli

5 May 1996 8	Boca Juniors	0-6	Gimnasia y Esgrima (LP)	La Boca
	Fabbri (yellow card) 60' (yellow-red card); Mac Allister (yellow card); Manteca Martinez (yellow card)	Report	Guillermo Barros Schelotto 2'; Guillermo Barros Schelotto 13'; Albornoz 40'; Guillermo Barros Schelotto 44'; Marcico 51' (pen.); Saccone 79'	Stadium: Estadio Alberto Cichero (La Bombonera); Referee: Cordero

11 May 1996 9	Colon	1-0	Boca Juniors	Santa Fe
	Saralegui 85'	Report	Mac Allister (yellow card); Caniggia (yellow card); Luppino (yellow card)	Stadium: Estadio Brigadier General Estanislao López; Referee: Ruscio

19 May 1996 10	Boca Juniors	4-1	Argentinos Juniors	La Boca
	Fabbri 22'; Veron 30'; Caniggia 60'; Manteca Martinez 71'; Peralta (yellow card); Maradona (yellow card)	Report	Cardinal 63'	Stadium: Estadio Alberto Cichero (La Bombonera); Referee: Elizondo

26 May 1996 11	San Lorenzo	1-2	Boca Juniors	Bajo Flores
	Silas 6'; Manuslovich (yellow card) 84' (yellow-red card)	Report	Kily González 16'; Veron 45'; Gamboa (yellow card); Veron (yellow card); Caniggia (red card) 31'; Scotto (yellow card) 89' (yellow-red card)	Stadium: Nuevo Gasometro; Referee: Lamolina

9 June 1996 12	Boca Juniors	2-0	Belgrano de Córdoba	La Boca
	Maradona (penalty missed) 46'; Manteca Martinez 80'; Maradona 90'	Report		Stadium: Estadio Alberto Cichero (La Bombonera); Referee: Olivetto

16 June 1996 13	Velez Sarsfield	5-1	Boca Juniors	Liniers
	Camps 20'; Chilavert 40'; Chilavert 43' (pen.); Gamboa 79' (own goal); Turu Flores 88'	Report	Caniggia 15'; Navarro Montoya (yellow card); Fabbri (red card) 42'; Maradona (red card) 43'; Mac Allister (yellow card) 89' (yellow-red card); Carrizo (yellow card)	Stadium: Estadio Jose Amalfitani; Referee: Castrilli

23 June 1996 14	Boca Juniors	3-2	Banfield	La Boca
	Caniggi 55'; Tchami 58'; Tchami 90'; Veron (yellow card); Kily González (yellow card); Giunta (yellow card)	Report	Julio Cruz 67'; Baena 81'	Stadium: Estadio Alberto Cichero (La Bombonera); Referee: Lamolina

29 June 1996 15	Rosario Central	0-1	Boca Juniors	Rosario
		Report	Maradona (penalty missed) 59'; Fabbri 68'; Veron (penalty missed) 72'; Vivas (yellow card); Caniggia (yellow card); Arruabarrena (yellow card)	Stadium: Estadio El Gigante de Arroyito; Referee: A .Sanchez

14 July 1996 16	Boca Juniors	4-1	River Plate	La Boca
	José Horacio Basualdo 43'; Caniggia 50'; Caniggia 66' Fabbri (yellow card) 73' (yellow-red card); Maradona (penalty missed) 74'; Caniggia 75'; Carrizo (yellow card)	Report	Altamirano (yellow card) 73' (yellow-red card); Amato 88'	Stadium: Estadio Alberto Cichero (La Bombonera); Referee: Hay

7 August 1996 17	Racing Club	1-0	Boca Juniors	Avellaneda
	Piojo Lopez 82'	Report	Maradona (penalty missed) 87'; Vivas (yellow card); Kily González (yellow card)	Stadium: Cilindro de Avellaneda; Referee: Lamolina

11 August 1996 18	Boca Juniors	1-2	Estudiantes La Plata	La Boca
	Veron 14'; Vivas (yellow card)	Report	Martin Palermo 22'; Martin Palermo 72'	Stadium: Estadio Alberto Cichero (La Bombonera); Referee: Gimenez

18 August 1996 19	Deportivo Español	1-1	Boca Juniors	Parque Avellaneda
	Grondona 90'	Report	Kily González 57'; Yorno (yellow card); Peralta (yellow card); Gomez (yellow card)	Stadium: Estadio Nueva España; Referee: Dellacasa

=== 1995 Supercopa Libertadores ===
==== Preliminary round ====
Teams	Pts.	G	W	D	L	GF	GA	DF
(Brazil) São Paulo	9	4	3	0	1	6	6	0
(Paraguay) Olimpia	7	4	2	1	1	7	4	3
(Argentina) Boca Juniors	1	4	0	1	3	4	7	–3

7 September 1995	(Paraguay) Olimpia	1:1 (1:0)	Boca Juniors	Asunción
	Monzón 6' (pen.)	Report	Fabbri 64'	Stadium: Estadio Defensores del Chaco; Referee: (Brazil) Antônio Pereira

13 September 1995	(Brazil) São Paulo	1:0 (0:0)	Boca Juniors	São Paulo
	Caio 58'	Report		Stadium: Estadio Pacaembú; Referee: (Uruguay) José Luis Da Rosa

20 September 1995	Boca Juniors	1:2 (1:0)	(Paraguay) Olimpia	La Boca
	Pico 16'	Report	Sanabria 80'; González 83'	Stadium: Estadio La Bombonera; Referee: (Chile) Eduardo Gamboa Martínez

10 October 1995	Boca Juniors	2:3 (1:0)	(Brazil) São Paulo	La Boca
	Márcico 45+1' (pen.); Pico 72'	Report	Amaral 59' 65'; Caio 87'	Stadium: Estadio La Bombonera; Referee: (Uruguay) Eduardo Dluzniewski

== Statistics ==
=== Players statistics ===
No.	Pos	Nat	Player	Total		Apertura 95		Clausura 96	
No.	Pos	Nat	Player	Apps	Goals	Apps	Goals	Apps	Goals
	GK	(Colombia) COL	Navarro Montoya	35	0	18	0	17	0
		(Argentina) ARG	Vivas	25	2	8	1	17	1
	DF	(Argentina) ARG	Mac Allister	34	1	19	1	15	0
	DF	(Argentina) ARG	Fabbri	33	4	18	2	15	2
	MF	(Argentina) ARG	Kily González	36	3	18	0	18	3
	DF	(Argentina) ARG	Scotto	26	7	17	7	9	0
	FW	(Uruguay) URU	Martinez	22	8	15	4	7	4
		(Argentina) ARG	Gamboa	27	0	14	0	13	0
		(Argentina) ARG	Marcico	14	0	14	0	0	0
		(Argentina) ARG	Saldaña	21	0	14	0	7	0
	FW	(Argentina) ARG	Caniggia	29	12	13	2	16	10
		(Argentina) ARG	Soñora	13	0	13	0		
10	FW	(Argentina) ARG	Maradona	24	5	11	3	13	2
		(Argentina) ARG	Peralta	22	2	11	1	11	1
		(Argentina) ARG	Carrizo	25	0	11	0	14	0
	MF	(Cameroon) CMR	Tchami	18	4	9	2	9	2
		(Argentina) ARG	Giunta	13	0	9	0	4	0
		(Argentina) ARG	Medero	14	0	9	0	5	0
		(Argentina) ARG	Pico	16	0	8	0	8	0
		(Argentina) ARG	Yorno	3	0	2	0	1	0
	DF	(Argentina) ARG	Arruabarrena	8	0	1	0	7	0
		(Argentina) ARG	Calvo	1	0	1	0		
		(Argentina) ARG	Gimenez	3	0	1	0	2	0
		(Argentina) ARG	Gomez	1	1	1	0		
11	MF	(Argentina) ARG	Verón	17	4	0	0	17	4
	MF	(Argentina) ARG	Basualdo	16	1	0	0	16	1
	MF	(Argentina) ARG	Del Rio	1	0	0	0	1	0
	MF	(Argentina) ARG	Larroque	1	0	0	0	1	0
	MF	(Argentina) ARG	Llupino	1	0	0	0	1	0

- Source: https://www.historiadeboca.com.ar/torneo-apertura-1995/1995/41.html
