= Darío Scotto =

Argentine footballer

Personal information
- Full name: Darío Oscar Scotto
- Date of birth: September 1, 1969 (age 57)
- Place of birth: Buenos Aires, Argentina
- Height: 1.75 m (5 ft 9 in)
- Position: Striker

Youth career
- Deportivo Español
- Platense

Senior career*
Years	Team	Apps	(Gls)
1987–1992	Platense	120	(26)
1992–1993	Sporting Gijón	19	(3)
1993–1994	Necaxa	22	(0)
1994–1995	Rosario Central	33	(15)
1995–1996	Boca Juniors	26	(7)
1996–1997	Rosario Central	11	(2)
1997	Gimnasia y Tiro	14	(4)
1998	Argentinos Juniors	18	(7)
1998–1999	Rosario Central	20	(5)
1999–2000	Argentinos Juniors	5	(0)
2000	Cerro Porteño	1	(0)
2001	Santiago Wanderers	8	(3)
2003	Aurora	4	(0)
Total		301	(72)

International career
1989	Argentina U20	4	(0)
1992	Argentina	1	(0)
- * Club domestic league appearances and goals

Darío Oscar Scotto (born September 1, 1969, in Buenos Aires) is a former Argentine footballer. He played club football in Argentina Spain, Mexico, Paraguay, Chile and Bolivia and played for the Argentina national football team.

Scotto started his professional career with Platense in 1987. He became a consistent goalscorer, tying Diego Latorre as the topscorer of the 1992 Clausura. this achievement won him a call up to the Argentina national team and a move to Spanish side Sporting de Gijón.

In 1993 Scotto was signed by Mexican club Necaxa but he soon returned to Argentina where he signed for Rosario Central. In 1995, he joined Boca Juniors where he played alongside Diego Maradona. After a good season in the Apertura 1995 where he scored 7 goals, he struggled to maintain his form and returned to Rosario Central in 1996.

In 1997, he endured a desperate season with Gimnasia y Tiro before joining Argentinos Juniors in 1998.

In the latter part of his career he played for Cerro Porteño in Paraguay, Santiago Wanderers in Chile and Aurora in Bolivia. He retired in 2003.

== Honours ==
Santiago Wanderers

- Primera División de Chile (1): 2001
