= 1995–96 in Argentine football =

Football in Argentina
- Season: 1995–96

1995–96 was the first season in which the Argentine Primera implemented the 3-points-for-a-win system. Vélez Sársfield were double champions, winning both the Apertura and Clausura tournaments. In international club football River Plate won the Copa Libertadores 1996 and Rosario Central won Copa CONMEBOL 1995.

== Torneo Apertura ("Opening" Tournament) ==
Position	Team	Points	Played	Won	Drawn	Lost	For	Against	Difference
1	Vélez Sársfield	41	19	13	2	4	29	13	16
2	Racing Club	35	19	10	5	4	35	24	11
3	Lanús	35	19	10	5	4	25	16	9
4	Boca Juniors	35	19	9	8	2	23	16	7
5	San Lorenzo	32	19	9	5	5	35	24	11
6	Huracán	32	19	9	5	5	25	22	3
7	River Plate	29	19	7	8	4	21	20	1
8	Gimnasia de Jujuy	28	19	8	4	7	28	30	-2
9	Estudiantes de La Plata	25	19	6	7	6	29	23	6
10	Rosario Central	24	19	5	9	5	18	20	-2
11	Platense	23	19	5	8	6	25	24	1
12	Newell's Old Boys	23	19	5	8	6	26	32	-6
13	Colón de Santa Fe	21	19	5	6	8	22	20	2
14	Independiente	21	19	4	9	6	15	18	-3
15	Gimnasia La Plata	21	19	5	6	8	14	25	-11
16	Argentinos Juniors	19	19	5	4	10	18	22	-4
17	Ferro Carril Oeste	17	19	3	8	8	21	29	-8
18	Deportivo Español	17	19	3	8	8	18	26	-8
19	Banfield	14	19	2	8	9	17	29	-12
20	Belgrano de Córdoba	13	19	2	7	10	12	23	-11

=== Top scorers ===
Position	Player	Team	Goals
1	José Luis Calderón	Estudiantes de La Plata	13
2	Claudio Biaggio	San Lorenzo	10
2	Rubén Capria	Racing Club	10

== Torneo Clausura ("Closing" Tournament) ==
Position	Team	Points	Played	Won	Drawn	Lost	For	Against	Difference
1	Vélez Sársfield	40	19	11	7	1	40	18	22
2	Gimnasia La Plata	39	19	12	3	4	44	21	23
3	Lanús	34	19	10	4	5	35	24	11
4	Estudiantes de La Plata	34	19	9	7	3	33	22	11
5	Boca Juniors	33	19	10	3	6	30	26	4
6	Rosario Central	30	19	8	6	5	33	23	10
7	Huracán	29	19	7	8	4	32	29	3
8	Racing Club	29	19	8	5	6	26	25	1
9	Colón de Santa Fe	26	19	7	5	7	20	21	-1
10	Ferro Carril Oeste	26	19	6	8	5	16	20	-4
11	Deportivo Español	24	19	5	9	5	19	19	0
12	Independiente	23	19	5	8	6	22	26	-4
13	Belgrano de Córdoba	22	19	6	4	9	23	26	-3
14	River Plate	21	19	6	3	10	32	33	-1
15	Platense	21	19	6	3	10	23	29	-6
16	Gimnasia de Jujuy	21	19	6	3	10	22	37	-15
17	Newell's Old Boys	18	19	3	9	7	20	28	-8
18	Banfield	17	19	4	5	10	20	25	-5
19	San Lorenzo	16	19	4	4	11	15	29	-14
20	Argentinos Juniors	13	19	3	4	12	12	36	-24

=== Top scorers ===
Position	Player	Team	Goals
1	Ariel López	Lanús	12
2	Martín Palermo	Estudiantes	11
3	Claudio Caniggia	Boca Juniors	10
3	Adrián Coria	Platense	10
3	Alberto Márcico	Gimnasia La Plata	10

== Argentine clubs in international competitions ==
Team	Recopa 1995	Supercopa 1995	CONMEBOL 1995	Copa Libertadores 1996
River Plate	N/A	SF	N/A	Champions
Rosario Central	N/A	N/A	Champions	did not qualify
Independiente	Runner up	Champions	did not qualify	did not qualify
San Lorenzo	N/A	N/A	N/A	QF
Gimnasia La Plata	N/A	N/A	Round 1	did not qualify
Argentinos Juniors	N/A	Round 1	did not qualify	did not qualify
Boca Juniors	N/A	Round 1	did not qualify	did not qualify
Estudiantes	N/A	Round 1	did not qualify	did not qualify
Racing Club	N/A	Round 1	did not qualify	did not qualify
Vélez Sársfield	N/A	Round 1	did not qualify	did not qualify
