= Kily González =

Argentine footballer & manager (born 1974)

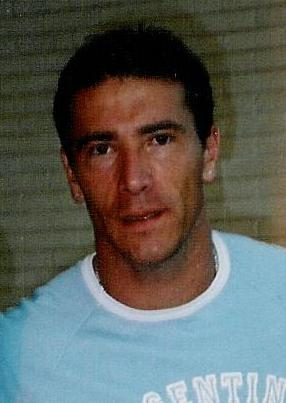
- González in 2003

Personal information
- Full name: Cristian Alberto González Peret
- Date of birth: 4 August 1974 (age 52)
- Place of birth: Rosario, Santa Fe, Argentina
- Height: 1.73 m (5 ft 8 in)
- Position: Winger

Team information
- Current team: Inter Miami (head coach)

Youth career
- Rosario Central

Senior career*
| Years | Team | Apps | (Gls) |
| 1993–1995 | Rosario Central | 51 | (7) |
| 1995–1996 | Boca Juniors | 37 | (3) |
| 1996–1999 | Zaragoza | 90 | (15) |
| 1999–2003 | Valencia | 92 | (8) |
| 2003–2006 | Inter Milan | 51 | (0) |
| 2006–2009 | Rosario Central | 76 | (10) |
| 2009–2010 | San Lorenzo | 32 | (0) |
| 2010–2011 | Rosario Central | 17 | (2) |
| Total | | 446 | (45) |

International career
| 1995–2005 | Argentina | 56 | (9) |
| 2004 | Argentina Olympic (O.P.) | 6 | (1) |

Managerial career
- 2020–2022: Rosario Central
- 2023–2025: Unión
- 2025: Platense
- 2026–: Inter Miami
Medal record
Men's Football
Representing Argentina
Olympic Games
| Gold medal – first place | 2004 Athens | Team |
Copa América
| Runner-up | 2004 Peru |
- * Club domestic league appearances and goals

Cristian Alberto 'Kily' González Peret (born 4 August 1974) is an Argentine football manager and former professional player who played mainly as a left winger. He is currently the head coach of Major League Soccer club Inter Miami.

He started his career with Rosario Central, which he would represent in three different spells, moving to Spain in 1996 where he appeared for Zaragoza and Valencia, amassing La Liga totals of 182 matches and 23 goals during seven seasons and winning the national championship with the latter. He also played in two consecutive UEFA Champions League finals (1999–2000, 2000–01) and was named in the UEFA Team of the Year in 2001. He left Valencia in 2003, spending three years in Italy with Inter Milan before returning to the Argentine league.

González's spell in the Argentina national team lasted for ten years, in which he was selected for the 2002 World Cup and two Copa América tournaments, for a total of 56 caps, scoring 9 goals.

== Club career ==
=== Early years ===
Born in Rosario, Santa Fe, González started playing with local Rosario Central, making his Argentine Primera División debut on 18 December 1993 in a 0–2 away loss against Gimnasia.

After two years, he moved to Boca Juniors, spending the 1995–96 season there, playing alongside Diego Maradona.

=== Spain ===
In 1996, González was transferred to Real Zaragoza. He appeared in his first game in La Liga on 8 September, playing 19 minutes in a 2–1 win against Sevilla and, during his three-year spell in Aragon, shared teams with countryman Gustavo López who was also a winger.

Subsequently, González joined fellow league club Valencia for 1,300 million pesetas, being teammate to also Argentines Pablo Aimar and Roberto Ayala for several seasons and contributing with 31 matches and two goals in the 2001–02 campaign as his team won the league title after a 31-year wait. Following the emergence of younger Vicente, he became surplus to requirements – only 13 appearances and 546 minutes of action in his last year, which also included a run-in with manager Rafael Benítez– and left the Che as a free agent; additionally, he amassed UEFA Champions League combined totals of 31 matches and five goals, as they reached the final in 2000 and 2001, and was granted Spanish nationality in early January 2001.

=== Inter ===
In summer 2003, González followed former Valencia coach Héctor Cuper to Inter Milan, and again shared teams with several compatriots.

He was used mainly as a substitute during his tenure, playing 75 official games and failing to find the net.

=== Return home ===
Aged 32, González returned to his country and Rosario Central, going on to still be an important first-team member during three top flight seasons. On 4 August 2009, he joined San Lorenzo who was managed by former national teammate Diego Simeone; after the former's relegation, however, he decided to rejoin for a third spell and help in the Primera B Nacional campaign, following which he retired at 37.

In June 2020, after over a year in charge of its reserve team, González became Rosario Central's manager on an 18-month contract. On his debut on 3 November, the club won 2–1 at home to Godoy Cruz Antonio Tomba.

González led Central to the quarter-finals of the Copa Sudamericana in 2021, losing 5–3 on aggregate to Brazil's Red Bull Bragantino in August. The following 20 March, after a derby defeat to Newell's Old Boys, he was dismissed.

== International career ==
An Argentine international since 1995, González made his debut on 8 November in a 0–1 home defeat to Brazil. He was selected by manager Marcelo Bielsa for his 1999 Copa América squad, scoring one of his nine goals in the nation's 2–0 group stage win against Uruguay as the former went on to reach the quarter-finals only to be eliminated by eventual champions Brazil. He went on to become a regular member of the starting eleven under that coach, and also participated in the 2002 FIFA World Cup in Japan and South Korea, starting against England (and being replaced) and also appearing against Nigeria and Sweden in an eventual group stage exit.

Two years later, again under Bielsa, González was selected for the 2004 Summer Olympics tournament as one of three overaged players. He featured in all games and scored in the opener against Serbia (6–0), helping the Albiceleste win gold in Athens.

González also took part in the 2004 Copa América, netting three times in the tournament: his first two came in the group stage, in Argentina's victories against Ecuador and Uruguay, and his last was a penalty in regulation time in the final against Brazil, which eventually ended in a shootout loss with the player again converting his attempt.

== Style of play ==
González was a quick, strong and versatile midfielder, who was capable of playing both as a winger and as an attacking midfielder. His main attributes were his technical ability, vision, range of passing, determination and his powerful and accurate striking ability from distance, which enabled him both to create and score goals.

== Coaching career ==
González became the head coach of his former club Rosario Central, before going on to manage Unión and Platense. On 28 August 2026, he was announced as the new head coach of Major League Soccer club Inter Miami.

== Career statistics ==
=== Club ===
Appearances and goals by club, season and competition
| Club | Season | League | | | National cup (Note: Includes Copa del Rey, Coppa Italia) | | Continental | | Other | | Total | |
| Club | Season | Division | Apps | Goals | Apps | Goals | Apps | Goals | Apps | Goals | Apps | Goals |
|---|---|---|---|---|---|---|---|---|---|---|---|---|
| Rosario Central | 1993–94 | Primera División | 21 | 2 | – | | – | | – | | 21 | 2 |
| Rosario Central | 1994–95 | Primera División | 30 | 5 | – | | – | | – | | 30 | 5 |
| Rosario Central | Total | | 51 | 7 | – | | – | | – | | 51 | 7 |
| Boca Juniors | 1995–96 | Primera División | 36 | 3 | – | | – | | – | | 36 | 3 |
| Boca Juniors | 1996–97 | Primera División | 1 | 0 | – | | – | | – | | 1 | 0 |
| Boca Juniors | Total | | 37 | 3 | – | | – | | – | | 37 | 3 |
| Zaragoza | 1996–97 | La Liga | 30 | 3 | 4 | 1 | – | | – | | 34 | 4 |
| Zaragoza | 1997–98 | La Liga | 33 | 6 | 7 | 1 | – | | – | | 40 | 7 |
| Zaragoza | 1998–99 | La Liga | 29 | 6 | 1 | 0 | – | | – | | 30 | 6 |
| Zaragoza | Total | | 92 | 15 | 12 | 2 | – | | – | | 104 | 17 |
| Valencia | 1999–2000 | La Liga | 31 | 2 | 1 | 0 | 16 (Note: Appearances in UEFA Champions League) | 3 | 1 (Note: Appearance in Supercopa de España) | 0 | 49 | 5 |
| Valencia | 2000–01 | La Liga | 22 | 3 | 0 | 0 | 14 | 2 | – | | 36 | 5 |
| Valencia | 2001–02 | La Liga | 26 | 3 | 0 | 0 | 6 (Note: Appearances in UEFA Cup) | 0 | – | | 32 | 3 |
| Valencia | 2002–03 | La Liga | 13 | 0 | 1 | 0 | 6 | 1 | 0 | 0 | 20 | 1 |
| Valencia | Total | | 92 | 8 | 2 | 0 | 42 | 6 | 1 | 0 | 137 | 14 |
| Inter Milan | 2003–04 | Serie A | 21 | 0 | 4 | 0 | 7 | 0 | – | | 31 | 0 |
| Inter Milan | 2004–05 | Serie A | 14 | 0 | 5 | 0 | 2 | 0 | – | | 21 | 0 |
| Inter Milan | 2005–06 | Serie A | 16 | 0 | 4 | 0 | 2 | 0 | 0 | 0 | 22 | 0 |
| Inter Milan | Total | | 51 | 0 | 13 | 0 | 11 | 0 | 0 | 0 | 74 | 0 |
| Rosario Central | 2006–07 | Primera División | 31 | 4 | – | | – | | – | | 31 | 4 |
| Rosario Central | 2007–08 | Primera División | 24 | 3 | – | | – | | – | | 24 | 3 |
| Rosario Central | 2008–09 | Primera División | 24 | 3 | – | | – | | 2 (Note: Appearances in Argentine Primera relegation play-offs) | 0 | 26 | 3 |
| Rosario Central | Total | | 79 | 10 | – | | – | | 2 | 0 | 81 | 10 |
| San Lorenzo | 2009–10 | Primera División | 32 | 0 | – | | 5 (Note: Appearances in Copa Sudamericana) | 1 | – | | 37 | 1 |
| Rosario Central | 2010–11 | Primera B Nacional | 15 | 2 | – | | – | | – | | 15 | 2 |
| Career total | | | 447 | 45 | 27 | 2 | 58 | 7 | 3 | 0 | 535 | 54 |

=== International ===
Appearances and goals by national team and year
| National team | Year | Apps | Goals |
|---|---|---|---|
| Argentina | 1995 | 1 | 0 |
| Argentina | 1996 | 0 | 0 |
| Argentina | 1997 | 0 | 0 |
| Argentina | 1998 | 0 | 0 |
| Argentina | 1999 | 10 | 2 |
| Argentina | 2000 | 10 | 0 |
| Argentina | 2001 | 7 | 2 |
| Argentina | 2002 | 7 | 0 |
| Argentina | 2003 | 5 | 1 |
| Argentina | 2004 | 12 | 4 |
| Argentina | 2005 | 4 | 0 |
| Total | | 56 | 9 |

Scores and results list Argentina's goal tally first, score column indicates score after each González goal.

List of international goals scored by Kily González
| No. | Date | Venue | Opponent | Score | Result | Competition |
|---|---|---|---|---|---|---|
| 1 | 7 July 1999 | Estadio Feliciano Cáceres, Luque, Paraguay | Uruguay | 1–0 | 2–0 | 1999 Copa América |
| 2 | 17 November 1999 | Estadio La Cartuja, Seville, Spain | Spain | 1–0 | 2–0 | Friendly |
| 3 | 28 February 2001 | Stadio Olimpico, Rome, Italy | Italy | 1–1 | 2–1 | Friendly |
| 4 | 3 June 2001 | El Monumental, Buenos Aires, Argentina | Colombia | 1–0 | 3–0 | 2002 FIFA World Cup qualification |
| 5 | 6 September 2003 | El Monumental, Buenos Aires, Argentina | Chile | 1–0 | 2–2 | 2006 FIFA World Cup qualification |
| 6 | 28 April 2004 | Mohammed V Stadium, Casablanca, Morocco | Morocco | 1–0 | 1–0 | Friendly |
| 7 | 7 July 2004 | Estadio Elías Aguirre, Chiclayo, Peru | Ecuador | 1–0 | 6–1 | 2004 Copa America |
| 8 | 13 July 2004 | Estadio Miguel Grau (Piura), Piura, Peru | Uruguay | 1–1 | 4–2 | 2004 Copa America |
| 9 | 25 July 2004 | Estadio Nacional del Perú, Lima, Peru | Brazil | 1–0 | 2–2 (2–4 p.) | 2004 Copa America |

=== Managerial ===
As of 21 November 2026

| Team | Nat | From | To | Record | | | | | | | |
| Team | Nat | From | To | G | W | D | L | GF | GA | GD | Win % |
|---|---|---|---|---|---|---|---|---|---|---|---|
| Rosario Central | (Argentina) | 1 July 2020 | 21 March 2022 | 68 | 25 | 14 | 29 | 95 | 98 | −3 | 36.76 |
| Unión | (Argentina) | 26 June 2023 | 14 April 2025 | 78 | 25 | 26 | 27 | 68 | 72 | −4 | 32.05 |
| Platense | (Argentina) | 17 June 2025 | 27 October 2025 | 14 | 2 | 6 | 6 | 13 | 22 | −9 | 14.29 |
| Inter Miami | (United States) | 15 September 2026 | present | 10 | 4 | 3 | 3 | 19 | 16 | +3 | 40.00 |
| Total | | | | 170 | 56 | 49 | 65 | 195 | 208 | −13 | 32.94 |

== Honours ==
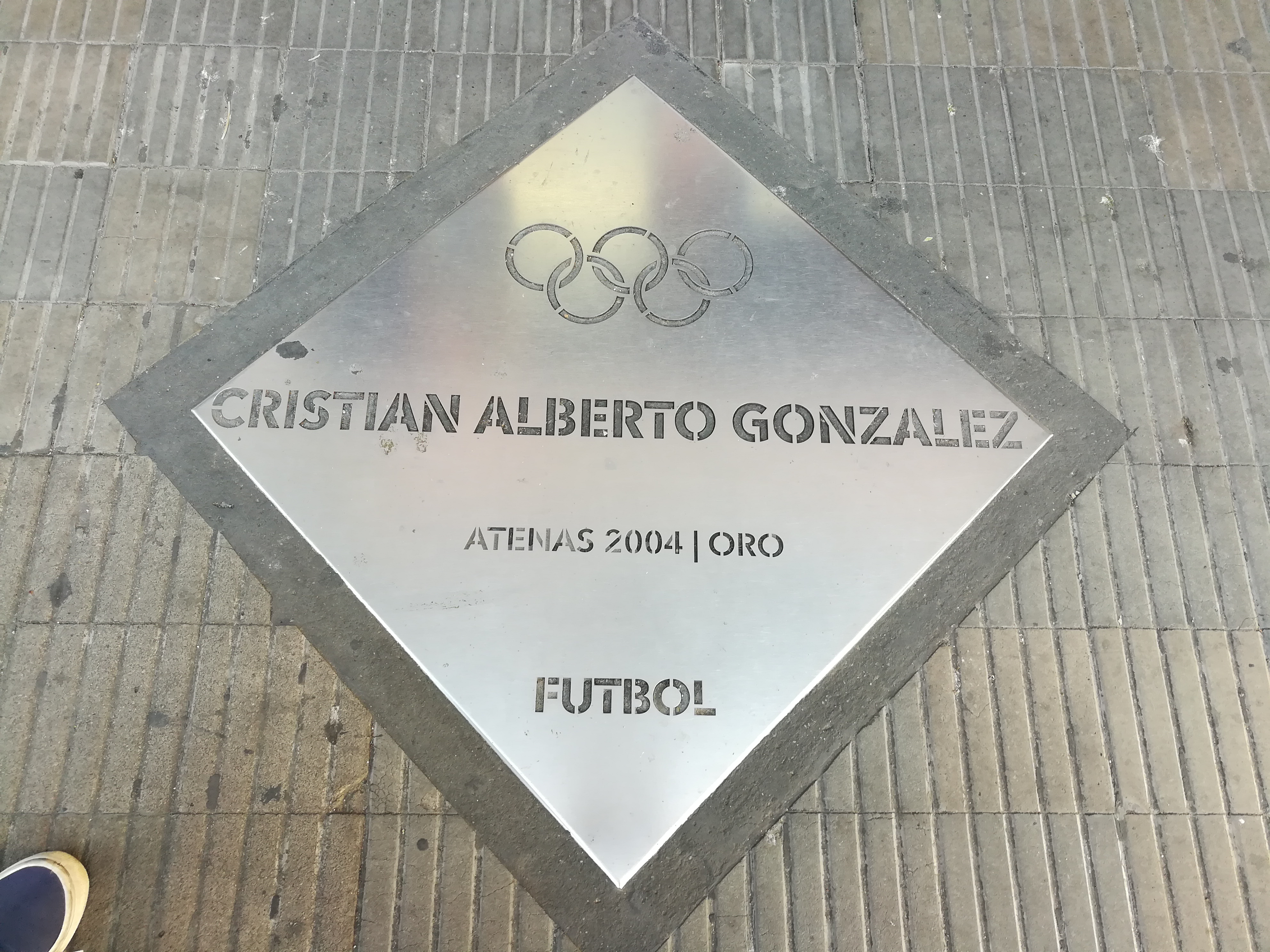
Plaque in Rosario commemorating González's Olympic gold medal in 2004

=== Player ===
Valencia

- La Liga: 2001–02
- Supercopa de España: 1999
- UEFA Champions League runner-up: 1999–2000, 2000–01

Inter Milan

- Serie A: 2005–06
- Coppa Italia: 2004–05, 2005–06
- Supercoppa Italiana: 2006

Argentina U23

- Summer Olympics: 2004

Argentina

- Copa América runner-up: 2004

Individual

- UEFA Team of the Year: 2001

=== Manager ===
Inter Miami

- Campeones Cup: 2026
