= Manchego CF =

Manchego
- Full name: Manchego Ciudad Real Club de Fútbol
- Founded: 2000
- Dissolved: 2009
- Ground: Juan Carlos I, Ciudad Real, Castile-La Mancha, Spain
- Capacity: 2,900
- 2008–09: Tercera División – Group 18, 3rd of 20
- Website: http://www.manchegociudadreal.com
Home colours	Away colours

Manchego Ciudad Real Club de Fútbol was a Spanish football team based in Ciudad Real in the namesake province, in the autonomous community of Castile-La Mancha. Founded in 2000, it held home games at Estadio Rey Juan Carlos I, with a capacity of 2,900 seats.

== History ==
After the disappearance of CD Manchego in 2000, Manchego CF was created. In July 2009, after six seasons in the fourth division, the club was in risk of being dissolved due to its outstanding debts, which reached €1.5 million.

After Manchego CF supporters decided the club should continue, the president was forced to resign and, a day later, a new club, CD Ciudad Real was created. The Professional Spanish Footballers Association extended the deadline for some clubs to pay debts to their players past July 31. However, on August 25, the Royal Spanish Football Federation relegated the club in spite of it having finished in third position, due to the club's economic situation, but Manchego decided not to take part in the championship.

The team was succeeded by CD Ciudad Real.

== Season to season ==
Season	Tier	Division	Place	Copa del Rey
2000–01	6	2ª Aut.	1st	
2001–02	5	1ª Aut.	4th	
2002–03	5	1ª Aut.	1st	
2003–04	4	3ª	15th	
2004–05	4	3ª	7th	
2005–06	4	3ª	6th	
2006–07	4	3ª	8th	
2007–08	4	3ª	5th	
2008–09	4	3ª	3rd	

- 6 seasons in Tercera División

== Honours ==
- 3 Campeonatos Diputación
- 1 Campeonato Regional de la Copa Federación

== Famous players ==
- (Spain) Iván Helguera
- (Spain) Luis Helguera
- (Spain) Paulino
- (Cameroon) Raoul Loé
