= Iván Helguera =

Spanish footballer

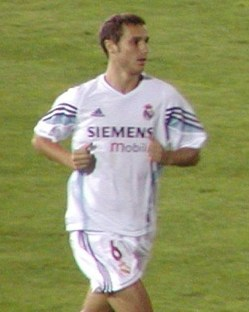
- Helguera with Real Madrid in 2003

Personal information
- Full name: Iván Helguera Bujía
- Date of birth: 28 March 1975 (age 51)
- Place of birth: Santander, Spain
- Height: 1.85 m (6 ft 1 in)
- Positions: Centre-back; defensive midfielder

Youth career
- Racing Santander

Senior career*
Years	Team	Apps	(Gls)
1994–1995	Racing B	4	(0)
1995	Revilla		
1995–1996	Manchego	13	(2)
1996–1997	Albacete	14	(2)
1997–1998	Roma	8	(0)
1998–1999	Espanyol	37	(2)
1999–2007	Real Madrid	229	(18)
2007–2008	Valencia	25	(1)
Total		330	(25)

International career
1998–2004	Spain	47	(3)

Managerial career
- 2020: Las Rozas
- * Club domestic league appearances and goals

Iván Helguera Bujía (Spanish pronunciation: [iˈβan elˈɣeɾa βuˈxi.a]; born 28 March 1975) is a Spanish former professional footballer.

Playing as either a central defender or defensive midfielder, with both good defensive and attacking skills, he represented five clubs during his career, notably Real Madrid – achieving team success as an important player – and Valencia. In his early 20s, he also had an unassuming abroad spell with Roma, going on to amass La Liga totals of 291 games and 21 goals over 11 seasons.

A Spanish international on nearly 50 occasions, Helguera represented the country at the 2002 World Cup and two European Championships.

== Club career ==
=== Early career ===
Born and raised in Santander, Cantabria and brought up at local Racing Club, Helguera started playing professionally for Manchego CF and Albacete Balompié, appearing in 14 Segunda División games in the 1996–97 season for the latter. He was purchased by Serie A side AS Roma after that, alongside compatriot César Gómez, but left after one disappointing campaign to join RCD Espanyol, where his stellar performances as a defender under coach Marcelo Bielsa led to a Real Madrid deal even before 1998–99 had finished.

=== Real Madrid ===
With Real Madrid from July 1999, Helguera was an instant first choice, and scored five and six La Liga goals in his second and fourth seasons (claiming the national championship on both occasions) while alternating between defender and midfielder. He was also instrumental in the capital team's two victories in the UEFA Champions League: in the 2000 final, against fellow Spaniards Valencia CF, he started the match as a sweeper in a 3–0 win, appearing as stopper two years later in the 2–1 defeat of Bayer 04 Leverkusen.

Not a starter in his final two years, Helguera still made a total of 42 appearances, scoring in a 3–1 away win over Gimnàstic de Tarragona on 28 October 2006. At the start of his last season he was surprisingly stripped of his No. 6 jersey which went to new signing Mahamadou Diarra, given No. 21 and made to train with the youth team in anticipation of his leaving the Santiago Bernabéu Stadium, even though his contract ran until June 2009; however, he later managed to fight his way back into the starting eleven, being somewhat influential in helping the club to the domestic league.

=== Valencia ===
On 20 July 2007, Helguera signed for Valencia on a three-year deal; upon joining, he stated that he had wanted to come for a "long time" and was "delighted" to arrive at the club. He was relatively important during his debut campaign, also helping the Che to win the Copa del Rey.

However, having featured very rarely in the first part of the following season under Unai Emery, Helguera's contract was cancelled on 12 December 2008, and both FC Dinamo București and Los Angeles Galaxy declared interest in signing the player, but nothing came of it and he retired from football later that year.

== International career ==
Helguera was capped 47 times for Spain, the first coming on 18 November 1998 in an away friendly with Italy (2–2). He played for his country at UEFA Euro 2000, the 2002 FIFA World Cup and Euro 2004, missing the 2006 World Cup after being omitted from the squad in the months before the tournament by national team coach Luis Aragonés.

== Personal life ==
Helguera's younger brother, Luis, was also a professional footballer. A midfielder, he played in the first division for Real Zaragoza and Deportivo Alavés, and also in Italy.

He married his longtime girlfriend Lorena, and welcomed his first baby, a boy named Luca, on 30 November 2005.

== Career statistics ==
=== Club ===
Appearances and goals by club, season and competition
Club	Season	League			Cup		Continental		Total	
Club	Season	Division	Apps	Goals	Apps	Goals	Apps	Goals	Apps	Goals
Manchego	1995–96		0	0					0	0
Manchego	1996–97		13	2					13	2
Manchego	Total		13	2					13	2
Albacete	1996–97	Segunda División	14	2					14	2
Roma	1997–98	Serie A	8	0	1	0	0	0	9	0
Espanyol	1998–99	La Liga	37	2	3	0	0	0	40	2
Real Madrid	1999–2000	La Liga	33	0	6	0	15	2	54	2
Real Madrid	2000–01	La Liga	32	5	1	0	16	6	49	11
Real Madrid	2001–02	La Liga	26	2	6	0	12	3	44	5
Real Madrid	2002–03	La Liga	33	6	1	0	17	0	51	6
Real Madrid	2003–04	La Liga	29	1	6	0	8	2	43	3
Real Madrid	2004–05	La Liga	34	3	1	0	10	1	45	4
Real Madrid	2005–06	La Liga	19	0	4	0	4	1	27	1
Real Madrid	2006–07	La Liga	23	1	2	0	5	0	30	1
Real Madrid	Total		229	18	27	0	87	15	343	33
Valencia	2007–08	La Liga	24	1	6	0	7	1	37	2
Valencia	2008–09	La Liga	1	0	2	0	3	0	6	0
Valencia	Total		25	1	8	0	10	1	43	2
Career total			326	25	39	0	97	16	462	41

=== International ===
Appearances and goals by national team and year
National team	Year	Apps	Goals
Spain	1998	1	0
Spain	1999	2	0
Spain	2000	10	0
Spain	2001	6	2
Spain	2002	11	0
Spain	2003	8	1
Spain	2004	9	0
Total		47	3

Scores and results list Spain's goal tally first, score column indicates score after each Helguera goal.

List of international goals scored by Iván Helguera
No.	Date	Venue	Opponent	Score	Result	Competition
1	24 March 2001	Estadio José Rico Pérez, Alicante, Spain	Liechtenstein	1–0	5–0	2002 World Cup qualification
2	28 March 2001	Mestalla Stadium, Valencia, Spain	France	1–0	2–1	Friendly
3	2 April 2003	Estadio Reino de León, León, Spain	Armenia	2–0	3–0	Euro 2004 qualifying

== Honours ==
Real Madrid

- La Liga: 2000–01, 2002–03, 2006–07
- Supercopa de España: 2003
- UEFA Champions League: 1999–2000, 2001–02
- Intercontinental Cup: 2002
- UEFA Super Cup: 2002

Valencia

- Copa del Rey: 2007–08
