= Antonio García Torres =

Mexican politician

- Born: 11 October 1943 (age 82); Zitácuaro, Michoacán, Mexico
- Education: UNAM
- Occupation: Politician
- Political party: PRI

Antonio García Torres (born 11 October 1943) is a Mexican politician affiliated with the Institutional Revolutionary Party. As of 2014 he served as Senator of the LVIII and LIX Legislatures of the Mexican Congress representing Michoacán.
