= Fabián Carrizo =

Argentinian footballer (born 1966)

Fabian Carrizo
Personal information
- Full name: Fabian Gustavo Carrizo
- Date of birth: 27 July 1966 (age 60)
- Place of birth: Argentina
- Positions: Defender; midfielder

Senior career*
Years	Team	Apps	(Gls)
1984-1990	Boca Juniors		
1990-1994	San Lorenzo de Almagro	129	(2)
1995-1996	Boca Juniors		
1996-1999	Club Atlético Independiente	26	(0)
1999-2001	Club Atlético Huracán	30	(1)
- * Club domestic league appearances and goals

Fabian Carrizo (born 27 July 1966 in Argentina) is an Argentinean retired footballer.
