= Fernando Gamboa =

Argentine footballer & coach (born 1970)

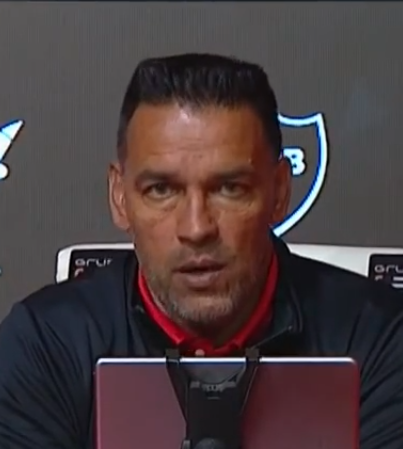
- Gamboa in 2021

Personal information
- Full name: Fernando Andrés Gamboa
- Date of birth: 28 October 1970 (age 56)
- Place of birth: Marcos Juárez, Argentina
- Position: Defender

Youth career
- Newell's Old Boys

Senior career*
Years	Team	Apps	(Gls)
1988–1993	Newell's Old Boys	121	(5)
1993–1994	River Plate	12	(0)
1994–1996	Boca Juniors	54	(0)
1996–1999	Oviedo	69	(2)
1999–2000	Newell's Old Boys	23	(2)
2000–2001	Chacarita Juniors	13	(0)
2001	Colo-Colo	20	(0)
2002	Chacarita Juniors	17	(1)
2003–2004	Grasshoppers	36	(1)
2004	Argentinos Juniors	2	(0)
Total		367	(11)

International career
1989	Argentina U20	2	(0)
1991	Argentina	15	(0)

Managerial career
- 2008: Newell's Old Boys
- 2009–2010: Chacarita Juniors
- 2010: Veracruz
- 2010–2011: Colón
- 2012–2013: Independiente Rivadavia
- 2013–2014: Rangers de Talca
- 2015–2016: Chacarita Juniors
- 2016–2017: Gimnasia y Esgrima de Jujuy
- 2018: Agropecuario
- 2018–2019: Nacional Asunción
- 2021: Newell's Old Boys
- 2023–2024: Sport Boys
- * Club domestic league appearances and goals

Fernando Andrés Gamboa (born 28 October 1970 in Marcos Juárez, Córdoba) is an Argentine football manager and former player who played as a defender.

== Playing career ==
Gamboa started his playing career in 1988 with Newell's Old Boys where he won two league championships.

In 1991, he was part of the Argentina squad that won the 1991 Copa América

He joined River Plate in 1993, and after 12 league games in the 1993–94 season he moved to Boca Juniors.

Between 1996 and 1999 Gamboa played for Oviedo in Spain, before returning for a second spell with Newell's Old Boys.

Towards the end of his career he played for Chacarita Juniors and Argentinos Juniors in Argentina, Colo-Colo in Chile and Grasshoppers Zurich of Switzerland.

== Coaching career ==
Gamboa started his managerial career coaching Newell's Old Boys. In 2009 replaced Ricardo Zielinski in Chacarita Juniors signing until June 2010 and assisted Ricardo Lunari. However, they were sacked before the end of their contract. In May 2010 he signed for CD Veracruz of the Mexican second division. In September 2010 Gamboa agreed to replace Antonio Mohamed as head coach of Colón. The board of directors of Colon sacked him soon after the club lost 2–0 against Olimpo in a league match on 9 April 2011.

On 18 April 2018, Gamboa was appointed as the manager of Club Agropecuario Argentino. He left the club one month later. On 6 November 2018, he was then appointed as the manager of Paraguayan club Club Nacional. After the elimination in the first phase of the Copa Libertadores of 2019, he was fired on 31 January 2019.

== Honours ==
=== Club ===
Newell's Old Boys

- Primera División Argentina: 1990–91, Clausura 1992

River Plate

- Primera División Argentina: Clausura 1993

Grasshoppers Zurich

- Swiss Super League: 2002–03

=== International ===
Argentina

- Copa América: 1991
