= Walter Pico =

Argentinean footballer

Personal information
- Full name: Walter Reinaldo Pico
- Date of birth: 18 March 1969 (age 57)
- Place of birth: Argentina
- Positions: Midfielder; forward

Senior career*
Years	Team	Apps	(Gls)
-1992	Boca Juniors		
1992-1993	Club Atlético Vélez Sarsfield	50	(9)
1994	C.S. Emelec		
1995-1996	Boca Juniors		
1996-1998	UD Las Palmas	64	(11)
1998-1999/00	Albacete Balompié	29	(1)
1999/2000	FC Cartagena	9	(0)
2000-2001	Extremadura UD	31	(2)
- * Club domestic league appearances and goals

Walter Pico (born 18 March 1969 in Argentina) is an Argentinean retired footballer.
