= Otto Konrad =

Austrian footballer

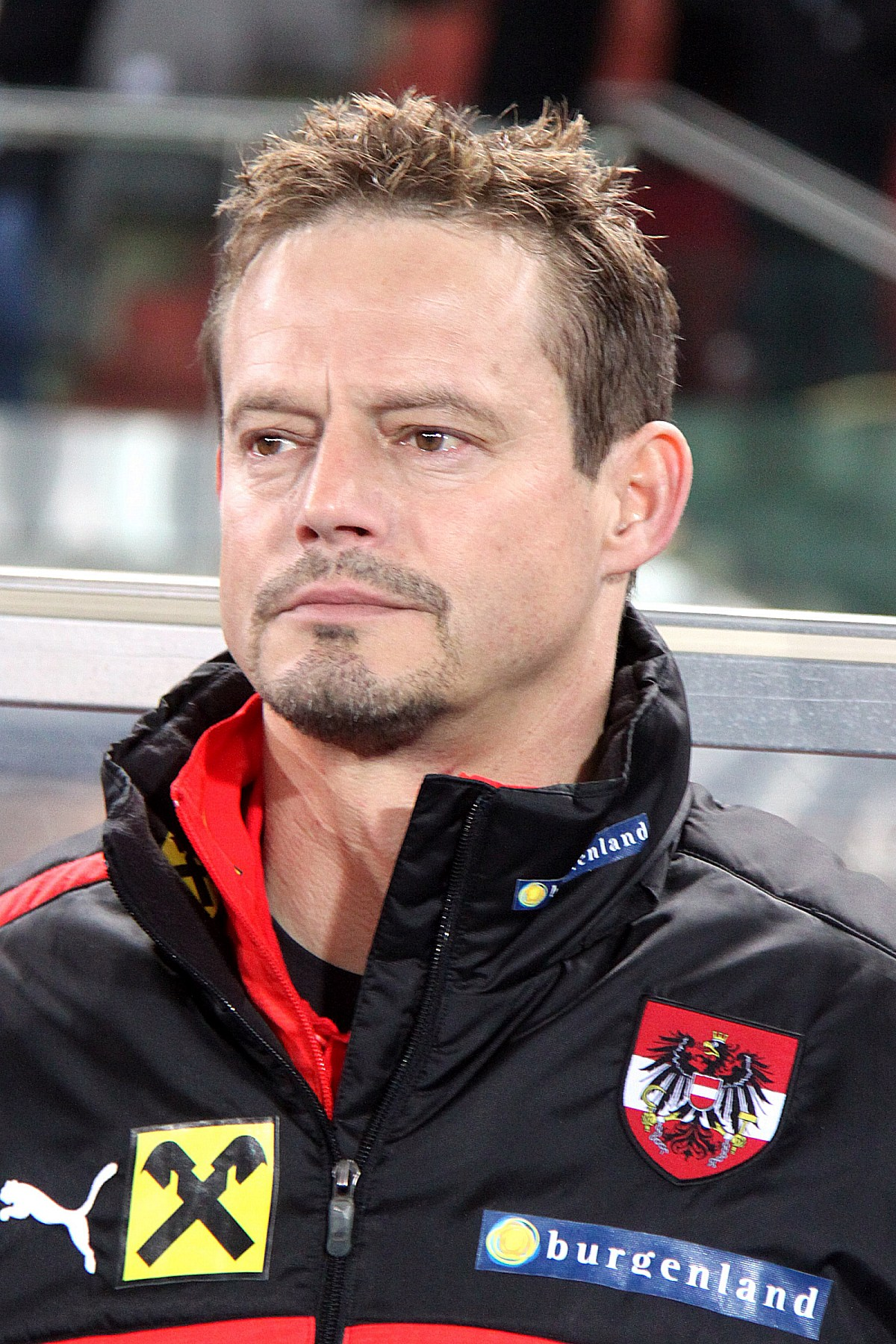
- Konrad in 2013

Personal information
- Date of birth: 1 November 1964 (age 61)
- Place of birth: Graz, Austria
- Height: 1.87 m (6 ft 2 in)
- Position: Goalkeeper

Youth career
- –1981: Grazer Sportklub

Senior career*
Years	Team	Apps	(Gls)
1981–1992	Sturm Graz	76	(1)
1992–1996	SV Wüstenrot Salzburg	153	(1)
1997–1999	Real Zaragoza	25	(0)
1999–2001	DSV Leoben	10	(0)
1999–2000	→ Grazer AK (loan)	0	(0)
2001–2003	PSV Salzburg		

International career
1989–1995	Austria	12	(0)

Managerial career
- 2005–2006: Austria (goalkeeper coach)
- 2006–: Austria U21 (goalkeeper coach)
- * Club domestic league appearances and goals

Otto Konrad (born 1 November 1964) is an Austrian former professional footballer who played as a goalkeeper.

== Club career ==
Born in Graz, Konrad started his professional career with local outfit Sturm Graz, where he stayed 11 years before enjoying a successful period at Austria Salzburg. He played in both legs of the 1994 UEFA Cup Final which they lost to Inter Milan. He scored a headed goal in the 1994–95 season against Stahl Linz. In 1995, he won the Römer Award in honour of his success.

In 1997, he joined Spanish side Real Zaragoza to become their first goalkeeper but he left them after only one and a half season to return to Austria.

== International career ==
Konrad made his debut for Austria in a May 1989 friendly match against Norway and was a participant at the 1990 FIFA World Cup. He earned 12 caps. His last international was an August 1995 European Championship qualification match against Latvia.

== Honours ==
SV Wüstenrot Salzburg

- Austrian Football Bundesliga (3): 1994, 1995, 1997
