= Luis Helguera =

Spanish footballer (born 1976)

Personal information
- Full name: Luis Helguera Bujía
- Date of birth: 9 June 1976 (age 50)
- Place of birth: Ferrol, Spain
- Height: 1.81 m (5 ft 11 in)
- Position: Midfielder

Team information
- Current team: Las Palmas (sporting director)

Youth career
- Callealtera
- 1984–1995: Racing Santander

Senior career*
Years	Team	Apps	(Gls)
1995–1997	Manchego	72	(3)
1997–1999	Zaragoza B	64	(3)
1998–2000	Zaragoza	20	(0)
2000–2003	Udinese	54	(1)
2002–2003	→ Alavés (loan)	22	(0)
2003–2005	Fiorentina	10	(0)
2004	→ Ancona (loan)	13	(0)
2005–2008	Vicenza	109	(0)
2008–2013	Huesca	185	(8)
Total		440	(15)

Managerial career
- 2013–2014: Huesca (assistant)
- * Club domestic league appearances and goals

Luis Helguera Bujía (born 9 June 1976) is a Spanish former professional footballer who played as a midfielder.

== Playing career ==
Helguera was born in Ferrol, Galicia, his mother's hometown, but spent his entire upbringing in Santander, Cantabria, where he played in the youth system at Racing Club. After beginning his senior career with lowly CD Manchego he moved to Real Zaragoza, where he featured mostly for the reserves and appeared sporadically in La Liga over three seasons (his most games being 16 in 1999–2000, as the Aragon side finished fourth).

After his older brother, Iván, had played one season at AS Roma, Helguera also moved to Italy, representing Udinese Calcio for two years with a Deportivo Alavés loan in between. He spent a further five campaigns in that country, mostly in Serie B and latterly for Vicenza Calcio, returning in 2008 to his homeland to sign for SD Huesca, newcomers to Segunda División.

Helguera rarely missed a game for the club during his spell, helping them to retain their second-tier status for four years. In 2010–11 he also collected a 20 yellow cards in 37 matches, the highest total in the division. He retired in June 2013 at the age of 37 following relegation, amassing totals of 185 appearances and eight goals over the course of five seasons.

== Post-retirement ==
After retiring, Helguera was hired as Huesca's general manager. In October 2013, he was added to David Amaral's staff as an assistant coach, while also acting as match delegate. He stepped down from that role the following March after the manager was dismissed, but remained at the club in other capacities.

On 6 August 2015, Helguera was named UD Las Palmas' technical secretary. He resigned from the position in April 2018, following their top-flight relegation.

Helguera joined Levante UD in a similar role on 21 May 2018. Roughly one year later, he left the Estadi Ciutat de València.

On 2 March 2020, Helguera returned to Las Palmas, this time as sporting director; he signed a contract until June 2023.

== Personal life ==
Helguera was the younger brother of former Real Madrid, Valencia and Spain defender Iván Helguera. Both played abroad in Italy.
