= José Ignacio (footballer, born 1973) =

Spanish footballer

Personal information
- Full name: José Ignacio Sáenz Marín
- Date of birth: 28 September 1973 (age 53)
- Place of birth: Logroño, Spain
- Height: 1.78 m (5 ft 10 in)
- Position: Defensive midfielder

Youth career
- CD Logroñés

Senior career*
Years	Team	Apps	(Gls)
1992–1993	CD Logroñés B	42	(3)
1993–1995	CD Logroñés	48	(2)
1995–1997	Valencia	61	(1)
1997–2002	Zaragoza	146	(7)
2002–2005	Celta	73	(8)
2006	Logroñés CF	10	(0)
Total		380	(21)

International career
1994–1996	Spain U21	14	(0)
1996	Spain U23	4	(0)
2001	Spain	2	(0)
Medal record
Men's football
Representing Spain
UEFA European Under-21 Championship
Runner-up	1996 Spain
- * Club domestic league appearances and goals

José Ignacio Sáenz Marín (born 28 September 1973), known as José Ignacio, is a Spanish former professional footballer who played as a defensive midfielder.

== Club career ==
Born in Logroño, La Rioja, José Ignacio made his professional debut for hometown club CD Logroñés. Upon its La Liga relegation at the end of the 1994–95 season he signed for Valencia CF, helping with 27 matches to a final runner-up place in his first year.

In the summer of 1997, José Ignacio moved to Real Zaragoza, where he would spend five seasons. In the 2000–01 campaign he scored a career-best six goals, including one in a 14 April 2001 thriller at FC Barcelona that finished 4–4 as the Aragonese went on to barely avoid relegation (17th, adding that year's Copa del Rey), which would eventually befall the next year.

José Ignacio joined RC Celta de Vigo for 2002–03, making 33 league appearances as the Galician side qualified for the UEFA Champions League; in that tournament, he closed the 2–1 away win over AC Milan on 9 December 2003 to qualify his team for the knockout stages alongside the Italians. However, they would also be relegated to Segunda División on the domestic front.

Upon retiring in 2006 aged 33, one year after playing only 11 games as Celta returned to the top tier, José Ignacio rejoined his first club Logroñés as a director of football. Over 11 top-flight seasons, he amassed totals of 317 matches and 17 goals.

== International career ==
José Ignacio earned two caps for Spain in 2001. The first came in the 2002 FIFA World Cup qualifiers against Liechtenstein on 5 September, and he also appeared in a friendly in Huelva with Mexico two months later.

Previously, José Ignacio represented the nation at the 1996 Summer Olympics.

== Honours ==
Zaragoza

- Copa del Rey: 2000–01

Spain U21

- UEFA European Under-21 Championship runner-up: 1996
