= Rubén Capria =

Argentine footballer

Personal information
- Full name: Rubén Oscar Capria
- Date of birth: 6 January 1970 (age 56)
- Place of birth: General Belgrano, Argentina
- Height: 1.80 m (5 ft 11 in)
- Position: Attacking midfielder

Youth career
- Estudiantes LP

Senior career*
Years	Team	Apps	(Gls)
1990–1994	Estudiantes LP	117	(20)
1995–1999	Racing Club	94	(28)
1998	→ Cruz Azul (loan)	12	(2)
1999–2000	Chacarita Juniors	37	(11)
2000–2001	Lanús	12	(5)
2001–2003	Unión Santa Fe	49	(9)
2003	Barcelona SC	21	(5)
2004	Universidad Católica	11	(3)
2004–2005	Newell's Old Boys	30	(4)
2005–2006	Racing Club	24	(7)
2006–2007	Peñarol	31	(5)
- * Club domestic league appearances and goals

Rubén Oscar Capria (born 6 January 1970, in General Belgrano) is an Argentine former professional footballer who played as a midfielder in Argentina, Mexico, Ecuador, Chile and Uruguay.

Nicknamed Mago (Magician), because of his exquisite technique, Capria has played for six clubs in Argentina as well as Cruz Azul in Mexico, Barcelona in Ecuador, Universidad Católica in Chile and Peñarol in Uruguay.

== Personal life ==
Capria is the older brother of the also former footballer Diego Capria.

== Honours ==
Newell's Old Boys

- Primera Division Argentina: Apertura 2004
