= Yordi =

Spanish footballer (born 1974)

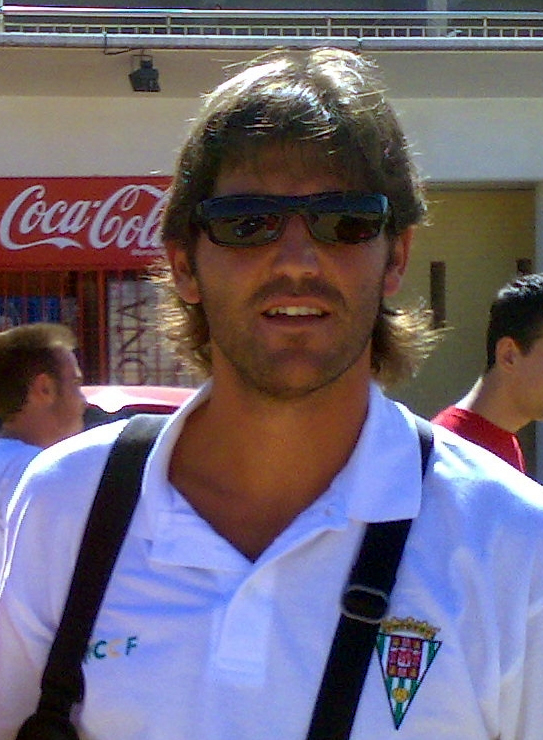
- Yordi while at Córdoba (2009)

Personal information
- Full name: Jorge González Díaz
- Date of birth: 14 September 1974 (age 52)
- Place of birth: San Fernando, Spain
- Height: 1.85 m (6 ft 1 in)
- Position: Striker

Youth career
- Sevilla

Senior career*
Years	Team	Apps	(Gls)
1993–1996	Sevilla B	69	(31)
1996	Sevilla	6	(1)
1996–1997	Atlético Madrid B	34	(19)
1997	Atlético Madrid	1	(0)
1997–2004	Zaragoza	164	(45)
2002	→ Blackburn Rovers (loan)	8	(2)
2004–2005	Getafe	27	(2)
2005–2006	Mallorca	16	(4)
2006–2008	Xerez	66	(22)
2008–2009	Córdoba	27	(5)
Total		418	(131)
- * Club domestic league appearances and goals

Jorge González Díaz (born 14 September 1974), known as Yordi, is a Spanish former professional footballer who played as a striker.

A journeyman, he amassed La Liga totals of 180 games and 37 goals during ten seasons, in representation of five teams (notably Zaragoza), and 161 matches and 61 goals in Segunda División.

In 2002, Yordi had a six-month spell in England with Blackburn Rovers.

== Career ==
Born in San Fernando, Cádiz, Andalusia, Yordi started his professional career with Sevilla, moving in 1996 to Atlético Madrid. He spent the vast majority of his only season with the Colchoneros with the B-team, winning the Pichichi Trophy award in Segunda División and being called up two the main squad only twice, once for the UEFA Champions League; on 23 June 1997, he played 30 minutes in a 3–0 home loss against Tenerife, in the last matchday.

In the summer of 1997, Yordi signed with Real Zaragoza where he stayed for seven seasons, one in the second level, being a very important attacking contributor although almost always off the bench: in 2000–01, for instance, as the Aragonese side won the Copa del Rey, he only started in ten of 31 La Liga matches, scoring four times for a final 17th position – barely out of the relegation zone.

In February 2002, Zaragoza loaned Yordi to Blackburn Rovers. During his time at Ewood Park, he came on as a substitute as his team won the 2002 Football League Cup and also netted twice in the Premier League, against Southampton and Middlesbrough. Subsequently, he returned to his country and represented Getafe and Mallorca, appearing sparingly for the latter club (both in the top level).

32-year-old Yordi slightly revived his career with Xerez, in division two. After a poor first season, he was the competition's top scorer in 2007–08, netting 20 goals as the Andalusians barely avoided relegation while also adopting Jorge as his shirt name.

On 19 July 2008, Yordi left Xerez and signed for another side in the region, Córdoba (also in the second tier), retiring at the end of the campaign at the age of 34.

== Honours ==
Zaragoza

- Copa del Rey: 2000–01, 2003–04

Blackburn Rovers

- Football League Cup: 2001–02

Individual

- Pichichi Trophy (Segunda División): 1996–97, 2007–08
