= Ander Garitano =

Spanish footballer and manager

Personal information
- Full name: Ander Garitano Urkizu
- Date of birth: 26 February 1969 (age 57)
- Place of birth: Derio, Spain
- Height: 1.74 m (5 ft 9 in)
- Position: Midfielder

Youth career
- Athletic Bilbao

Senior career*
Years	Team	Apps	(Gls)
1986–1988	Bilbao Athletic	67	(15)
1988–1996	Athletic Bilbao	234	(35)
1996–2002	Zaragoza	147	(15)
Total		448	(65)

International career
1984–1985	Spain U16	9	(3)
1986	Spain U18	2	(1)
1989–1990	Spain U21	5	(0)

Managerial career
- 2002–2008: Zaragoza (youth)
- 2008: Zaragoza
- 2008–2009: Zaragoza (youth)
- 2009–2010: Zaragoza B
- * Club domestic league appearances and goals

Ander Garitano Urkizu (born 26 February 1969) is a Spanish former professional football left midfielder and manager.

His career as a player – spent almost entirely in La Liga – was solely associated with two clubs, Athletic Bilbao and Zaragoza.

== Playing career ==
Born in Derio, Biscay, Garitano began his professional career at local powerhouse Athletic Bilbao. After appearing twice in the closing stages of 1987–88 he quickly imposed himself as a first-choice player with good free kick skills, scoring 35 La Liga goals over nine seasons; on 12 March 1988, two weeks after his 19th birthday, he made his official debut, starting in a 5–0 away loss against Real Madrid.

Garitano signed for Real Zaragoza in 1996, and played there until his retirement in six years later. He was still regularly used in the Aragonese side's victorious run in the 2000–01 Copa del Rey, and finally retired the following summer at 33 – Zaragoza suffered top-flight relegation – with more than 500 competitive matches to his credit; from 1986 to 1988 he played 61 games for Athletic Bilbao B, with that team in the Segunda División.

== Coaching career ==
Subsequently, Garitano moved into coaching, first taking charge of Zaragoza's youth teams. In mid-January 2008 he replaced the dismissed Víctor Fernández, first appearing in a Spanish Cup round-of-16 tie against Racing de Santander, a 4–2 loss (5–3 on aggregate).

Just two days after his only league game, a 3–1 home win over Real Murcia, Garitano quit the job, quoting a lack of commitment. The club would have a further two managers until the end of the campaign, which ended in relegation.

Garitano returned to Zaragoza for 2008–09, now as a youth coach. However, in late 2009, he moved to the reserves following José Aurelio Gay's promotion to the main squad.

== Personal life ==
Garitano was the younger brother of Angel Garitano (also known as 'Ondarru') who served for many years as assistant to Mané at managerial appointments including Deportivo Alavés and Athletic Bilbao, and the uncle of another footballer (and midfielder), Gaizka Garitano whom, after unsuccessfully graduating from Athletic's academy, went on to represent, among others, neighbours SD Eibar, Real Sociedad and Alavés. They were distantly related to Juan Urquizu who also served Athletic as player and manager. However, the Basque player and manager Asier Garitano is no relation.

== Career statistics ==
Appearances and goals by club, season and competition
Club	Season	League		Cup		Europe		Other (Note: Includes Supercopa de España, UEFA Super Cup, FIFA Club World Cup.)		Total	
Club	Season	Apps	Goals	Apps	Goals	Apps	Goals	Apps	Goals	Apps	Goals
Bilbao Athletic	1985–86	4	0			–		–		4	0
Bilbao Athletic	1986–87	34	4			–		–		34	4
Bilbao Athletic	1987–88	27	9			–		–		27	9
Bilbao Athletic	1988–89	2	2	–		–		–		2	2
Bilbao Athletic	Total	67	15	0	0	0	0	0	0	67	15
Athletic Bilbao	1987–88	2	0	0	0	–		–		2	0
Athletic Bilbao	1988–89	23	4	4	0	2	0	–		29	4
Athletic Bilbao	1989–90	36	5	4	2	–		–		40	7
Athletic Bilbao	1990–91	30	4	5	2	–		–		35	6
Athletic Bilbao	1991–92	29	7	7	3	–		–		36	10
Athletic Bilbao	1992–93	27	3	2	0	–		–		29	3
Athletic Bilbao	1993–94	26	6	3	0	–		–		29	6
Athletic Bilbao	1994–95	35	4	3	0	6	0	–		44	4
Athletic Bilbao	1995–96	26	2	5	0	–		–		31	2
Athletic Bilbao	Total	234	35	33	7	8	0	0	0	275	42
Zaragoza	1996–97	37	3	3	0	–		–		40	3
Zaragoza	1997–98	18	7	5	3	–		–		23	10
Zaragoza	1998–99	19	1	1	0	–		–		20	1
Zaragoza	1999–00	30	4	5	1	–		–		35	5
Zaragoza	2000–01	19	0	7	0	2	0	–		28	0
Zaragoza	2001–02	24	0	1	0	3	0	0	0	28	0
Zaragoza	Total	147	15	22	4	5	0	0	0	174	19
Career total		448	65	55	11	13	0	0	0	516	76

== Honours ==
Zaragoza

- Copa del Rey: 2000–01
