= Gary Sundgren =

Swedish footballer

Personal information
- Full name: Kari Juhani Sundgren
- Date of birth: 25 October 1967 (age 59)
- Place of birth: Vammala, Finland
- Height: 1.87 m (6 ft 2 in)
- Position: Defender

Youth career
- 1973: Västerås SK
- 1974–1987: IK Franke

Senior career*
Years	Team	Apps	(Gls)
1988–1997	AIK	221	(12)
1997–2002	Real Zaragoza	111	(2)
2002–2003	AIK	24	(1)
2004	Sollentuna		
2006	Djursholm		
Total		356	(15)

International career
1994–2000	Sweden	30	(1)
- * Club domestic league appearances and goals

Kari Juhani "Gary" Sundgren (born 25 October 1967) is a former professional footballer who played as either a right back or a central defender. He played professionally with AIK and Zaragoza between 1988 and 2003. Born in Finland, he played for the Sweden national team.

== Club career ==
Sundgren was born in Vammala, Finland, but moved to Sweden with his parents as a toddler, being raised in Västerås. There, he was often called Gary and it caught on, being addressed in the latter manner for the duration of his career.

Sundgren started playing professionally with AIK, being an undisputed starter from an early age. He scored the winner against Malmö FF when they became Swedish champions for the first time in 55 years, in 1992.

Subsequently, Sundgren moved abroad and joined La Liga club Real Zaragoza. He played 31 games in his first season, while also being instrumental in the Aragonese team's fourth place in 1999–2000.

After the 2001–02 campaign, with Zaragoza relegated, Sundgren returned to AIK, retiring from the game in 2006 after two seasons with two modest Stockholm sides, IFK Sollentuna and FC Djursholm.

== International career ==
Sundgren represented Sweden at UEFA Euro 2000, and played in the 0–0 draw against Turkey in the tournament. He was capped 30 times, scoring once.

== Personal life ==
Sundgren is the father of four children. One of his sons, Daniel, has also played for AIK, while his nephew Mikael Backlund is captain of the Calgary Flames of the National Hockey League.

== Career statistics ==
=== International ===
Appearances and goals by national team and year
National team	Year	Apps	Goals
Sweden	1994	1	0
Sweden	1995	3	0
Sweden	1996	7	0
Sweden	1997	11	1
Sweden	1998	2	0
Sweden	1999	2	0
Sweden	2000	4	0
Total		30	1

International goals

Scores and results list Sweden's goal tally first.

#	Date	Venue	Opponent	Score	Result	Competition
1.	16 February 1997	Supachalasai, Bangkok, Thailand	Thailand	1–0	3–1	1997 King's Cup

== Honours ==
AIK

- Allsvenskan: 1992
- Svenska Cupen: 1995–96, 1996–97

Zaragoza

- Copa del Rey: 2000–01

Sweden

- King's Cup: 1997
