= List of international goals scored by Benni McCarthy =

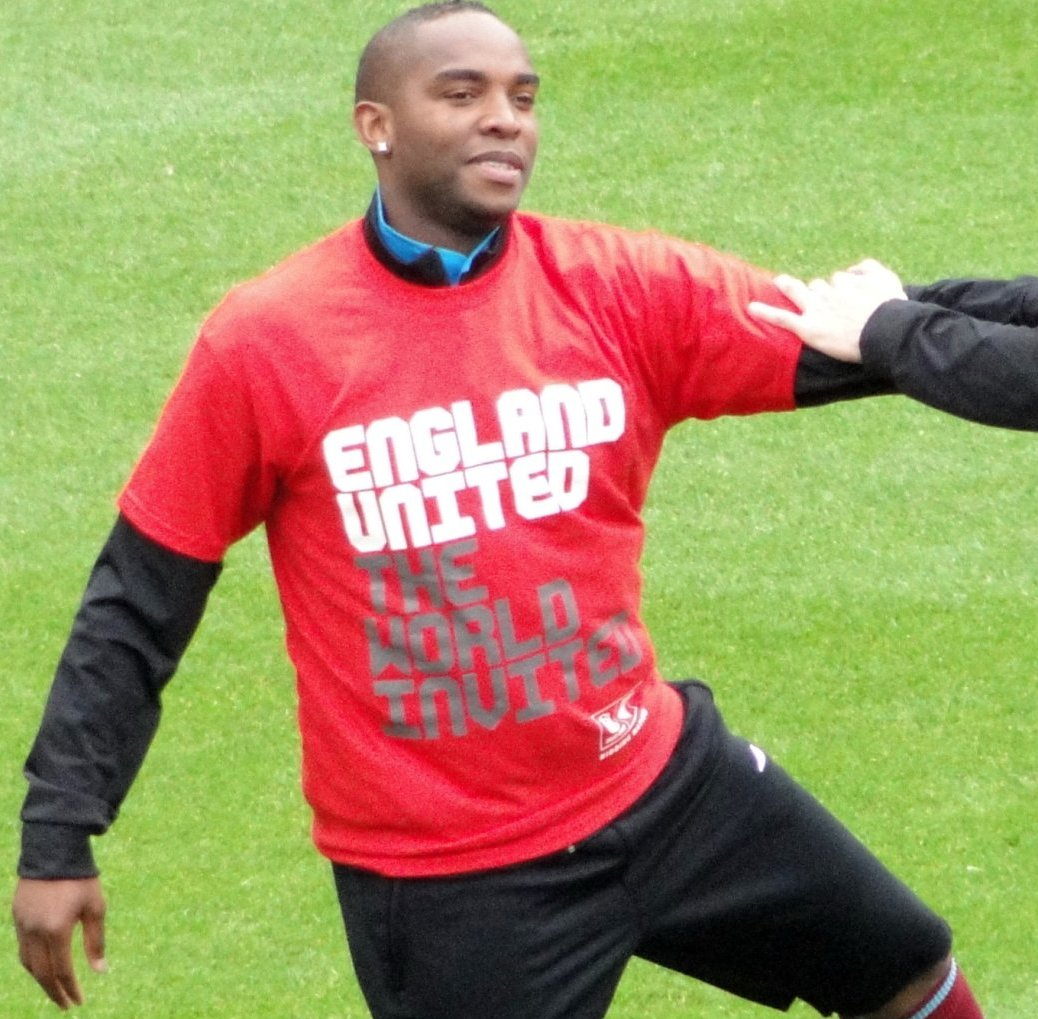
Benni McCarthy is South Africa's record goal scorer with 31 international goals to his name.

Benedict McCarthy is a former South African footballer who represented his country 79 times and scored 31 goals between 1997 and 2012. He played as a forward during the course of his career and is the top scorer in the history of the national team, having broken Shaun Bartlett's previous record of 29 international goals in a friendly win over Paraguay in March 2008.

Having previously represented South Africa at under-23 level, McCarthy made his senior debut on 4 June 1997 against the Netherlands. He scored his first international goals on 16 February 1998, scoring four times in 13 minutes against Namibia at the 1998 African Cup of Nations. He added another goal against Morocco and scored twice more against the Democratic Republic of Congo to lead South Africa to the final. Though the nation were ultimately beaten by Egypt, McCarthy was named Player of the Tournament, and collected the Top Scorer award for his seven goals. Later that year, at the 1998 FIFA World Cup in France, he scored South Africa's first ever goal at a World Cup finals, netting the equaliser in a 1–1 draw with Denmark that saw the nation earn a point at the competition for the first time. Adding three friendly goals against Iceland and Egypt, McCarthy ended with 11 goals to his name for the year.

He temporarily retired from international football in 1999 following club-versus-country conflicts and missed the 2000 African Cup of Nations as a result. Two years later, he scored at the 2002 FIFA World Cup in a 3–2 loss to Spain.

On 9 September 2007, McCarthy equalled Bartlett's national record when he scored in a 3–1 loss to Zambia. He broke the record the following year against Paraguay and scored one more goal before retiring from football in 2013 at the age of 35. At the time of his retirement, he was South Africa's fourth most-capped player. Of McCarthy's 31 international goals, 15 were scored in friendlies – including 2 at the HKSAR Reunification Cup and 1 at U.S. Cup – 7 at the African Cup of Nations, 4 during African Cup of Nations qualifying, 3 in World Cup qualifying and a further 2 at the World Cup finals.

== International goals ==
South Africa score listed first, score column indicates score after each McCarthy goal.

International goals scored by Benni McCarthy
No.	Date	Venue	Opponent	Score	Result	Competition	Ref(s)
1	16 February 1998	Stade Omnisport, Bobo-Dioulasso, Burkina Faso	Namibia	1–0	4–1	1998 African Cup of Nations	
2	16 February 1998	Stade Omnisport, Bobo-Dioulasso, Burkina Faso	Namibia	2–0	4–1	1998 African Cup of Nations	
3	16 February 1998	Stade Omnisport, Bobo-Dioulasso, Burkina Faso	Namibia	3–0	4–1	1998 African Cup of Nations	
4	16 February 1998	Stade Omnisport, Bobo-Dioulasso, Burkina Faso	Namibia	4–0	4–1	1998 African Cup of Nations	
5	22 February 1998	Stade Municipal, Ouagadougou, Burkina Faso	Morocco	1–0	2–1	1998 African Cup of Nations	
6	25 February 1998	Stade Municipal, Ouagadougou, Burkina Faso	DR Congo	1–1	2–1	1998 African Cup of Nations	
7	25 February 1998	Stade Municipal, Ouagadougou, Burkina Faso	DR Congo	2–1	2–1	1998 African Cup of Nations	
8	6 June 1998	Baiersbronn Stadion, Baiersbronn, Germany	Iceland	1–0	1–1	Friendly	
9	18 June 1998	Stadium de Toulouse, Toulouse, France	Denmark	1–1	1–1	1998 FIFA World Cup	
10	16 December 1998	FNB Stadium, Johannesburg, South Africa	Egypt	1–1	2–1	Friendly	
11	16 December 1998	FNB Stadium, Johannesburg, South Africa	Egypt	2–1	2–1	Friendly	
12	27 February 1999	Odi Stadium, Mabopane, South Africa	Gabon	4–1	4–1	2000 African Cup of Nations qualification	
13	5 June 1999	ABSA Stadium, Durban, South Africa	Mauritius	2–0	2–0	2000 African Cup of Nations qualification	
14	7 June 2000	The Cotton Bowl, Dallas, United States	Mexico	1–2	2–4	2000 Nike U.S. Cup	
15	24 March 2001	Boet Erasmus Stadium, Port Elizabeth, South Africa	Mauritius	1–0	3–0	2002 African Cup of Nations qualification	
16	5 May 2001	Ellis Park Stadium, Johannesburg, South Africa	Zimbabwe	2–0	2–1	2002 World Cup qualification	
17	15 January 2002	Mmabatho Stadium, Mafikeng, South Africa	Angola	1–0	1–0	Friendly	
18	23 May 2002	Hong Kong Stadium, Hong Kong Island, Hong Kong	Turkey	1–0	2–0	HKSAR Reunification Cup	
19	23 May 2002	Hong Kong Stadium, Hong Kong Island, Hong Kong	Turkey	2–0	2–0	HKSAR Reunification Cup	
20	12 June 2002	Daejeon World Cup Stadium, Daejeon, South Korea	Spain	1–1	2–3	2002 FIFA World Cup	
21	22 May 2003	ABSA Stadium, Durban, South Africa	England	1–1	1–2	Friendly	
22	15 November 2003	Cairo International Stadium, Cairo, Egypt	Egypt	1–0	1–2	Friendly	
23	18 August 2004	Stade El Menzah, Tunis, Tunisia	Tunisia	2–0	2–0	Friendly	
24	10 October 2004	Mandela National Stadium, Kampala, Uganda	Uganda	1–0	1–0	2006 World Cup qualification	
25	9 February 2005	ABSA Stadium, Durban, South Africa	Australia	1–0	1–1	Friendly	
26	4 June 2005	Estádio da Várzea, Praia, Cape Verde	Cape Verde	1–0	2–0	2006 World Cup qualification	
27	7 September 2005	Weser-Stadion, Bremen, Germany	Germany	2–3	2–4	Friendly	
28	14 January 2006	Cairo International Stadium, Cairo, Egypt	Egypt	2–1	2–1	Friendly	
29	9 September 2007	Newlands Stadium, Cape Town, South Africa	Zambia	1–3	1–3	2008 Africa Cup of Nations qualification	
30	26 March 2008	Super Stadium, Atteridgeville, South Africa	Paraguay	2–0	3–0	Friendly	
31	15 October 2008	Free State Stadium, Bloemfontein, South Africa	Ghana	1–1	2–1	Friendly	

== See also ==
- List of South Africa national football team hat-tricks
- List of top international association football goal scorers by country
- South African national football team records
