= Benni McCarthy =

South African footballer and coach (born 1977)

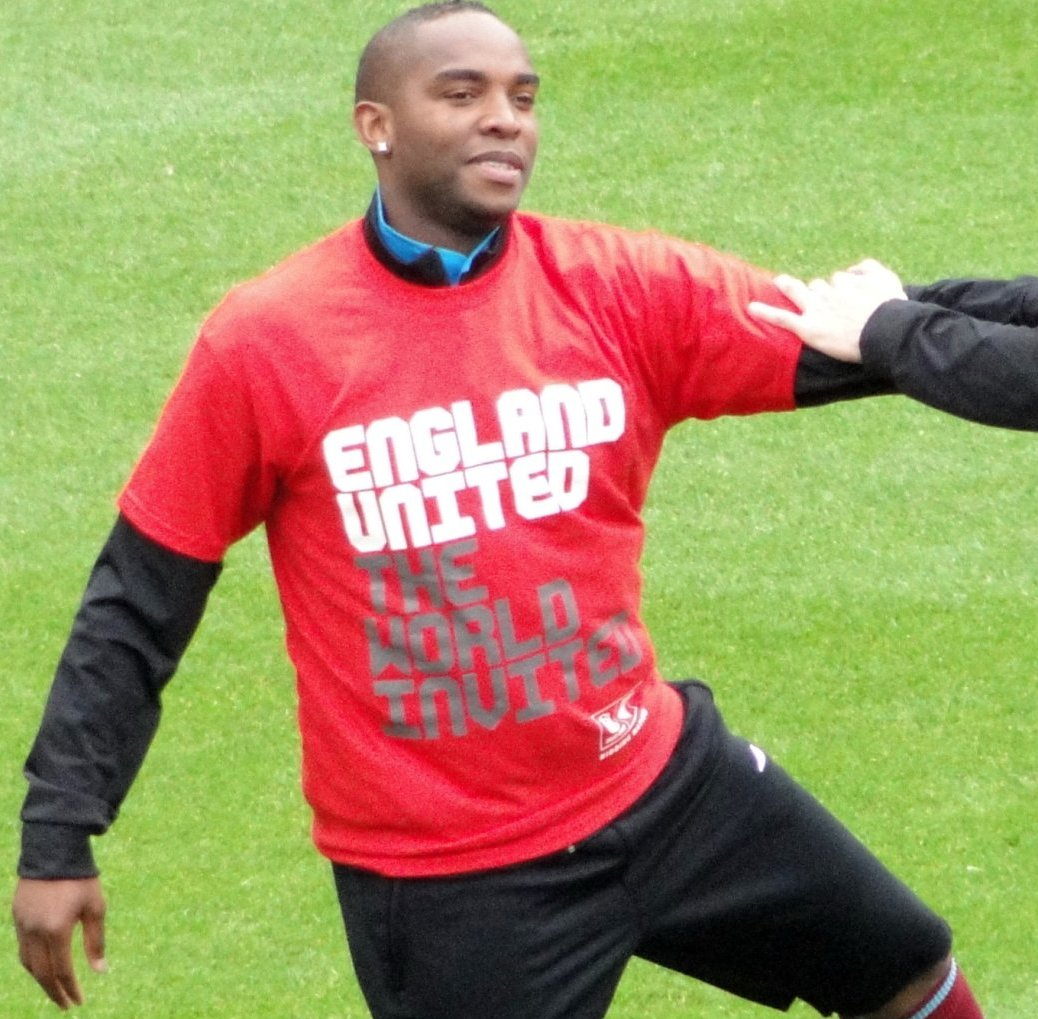
- McCarthy warming up for West Ham United in 2010

Personal information
- Full name: Benedict Saul McCarthy
- Date of birth: 12 November 1977 (age 49)
- Place of birth: Cape Town, South Africa
- Height: 1.83 m (6 ft 0 in)
- Position: Forward

Team information
- Current team: Kenya (manager)

Youth career
- Young Pirates
- Crusaders

Senior career*
Years	Team	Apps	(Gls)
1995–1997	Seven Stars	49	(42)
1996–1997	→ Cape Town Spurs (loan)	7	(3)
1997–1999	Ajax	36	(20)
1999–2003	Celta Vigo	66	(10)
2001–2002	→ Porto (loan)	11	(12)
2003–2006	Porto	75	(34)
2006–2010	Blackburn Rovers	109	(37)
2010–2011	West Ham United	11	(0)
2011–2013	Orlando Pirates	24	(10)
Total		387	(168)

International career
	South Africa U23	13	
1997–2012	South Africa	79	(31)

Managerial career
- 2017–2019: Cape Town City
- 2020–2022: AmaZulu
- 2025–: Kenya
Medal record
Men's football
Representing South Africa
Africa Cup of Nations
Runner-up	1998 Burkina Faso
- * Club domestic league appearances and goals

Benedict Saul McCarthy (born 12 November 1977) is a South African professional soccer coach and former player who is currently the manager of the Kenya national football team. A former forward, McCarthy is the South Africa national team's all-time top scorer with 31 goals. He is also the only South African to have won the UEFA Champions League, doing so with Porto in 2004. In 2026, FIFA cited McCarthy as one of the greatest South African players of all time.

McCarthy previously worked as the head coach of South African Premier Division sides Cape Town City and AmaZulu, and as striker's coach at Premier League club Manchester United.

== Early life ==
Benni McCarthy was born in Cape Town and grew up in Hanover Park in the Cape Flats, an area notorious for its high unemployment rate and gang violence. He is the son of Dudley and Dora McCarthy and has two brothers and a sister. His older brother is Jerome McCarthy, a former professional footballer who played for Kaizer Chiefs and Manning Rangers, among other clubs, while his younger brother Mark played football at Franklin Pierce University in the United States.

McCarthy began playing at a local side called Young Pirates, which was managed by his uncles. He then joined the youth structures of a local amateur club called Crusaders. At age 17, he was signed by first division club Seven Stars.

== Club career ==
=== Seven Stars ===
Playing for Seven Stars, the 18-year-old McCarthy scored 1 goal in 29 matches in the 1995–96 season, followed by another 12 goals in 20 matches, which earned him a transfer to Cape Town Spurs, which two years later merged with Seven Stars to form Dutch club Ajax's feeder team, Ajax Cape Town.

=== Ajax ===
In 1997, after an impressive showing at the African Youth Championship and FIFA World Youth Championship in Malaysia, he joined Ajax in the Eredivisie, where he scored nine goals and was crowned champion in his first season. After a relatively successful 1998–99 season, he was sold to Spanish side Celta Vigo for a transfer fee reported to be over €6 million, at the time the most expensive transfer for a South African player.

=== Celta Vigo ===
McCarthy joined Celta in 1999, but struggled to established himself as a regular choice for Celta's manager, Víctor Fernández. After two poor seasons at the Galician club, he was loaned to Porto.

==== Loan to Porto ====
McCarthy joined Porto in the 2001–02 season under the then newly appointed coach José Mourinho, where he became the main force behind the team's recovery. He helped them to third place in the Primeira Liga and automatic qualification for the UEFA Cup with 12 goals in 11 matches, but Porto's finances did not allow them to keep the player, despite the desire of both sides to continue.

==== Return from loan ====
In 2002–03, McCarthy returned to Celta where he spent much of his time on the substitutes' bench as a squad player.

=== Porto ===
When Porto sold striker Hélder Postiga to Tottenham Hotspur ahead of the 2003–04 season, Porto finally acquired McCarthy for a sum of €7.856 million (later re-sold part of the rights to GestiFute and First Portuguese Football Players Fund).

For the 2003–04 Primeira Liga season, he earned the Golden Boot award (with 20 goals in 23 starts) on the season's final matchday with a hat-trick, and was instrumental in Porto's run in the 2003–04 UEFA Champions League, which they won. He scored two goals against Manchester United to defeat them in the second round.

=== Blackburn Rovers ===
On 25 July 2006, McCarthy flew out to England to undergo a medical and probable contract signing to join Blackburn Rovers. Three days later, he signed a four-year contract with Blackburn for a £2.5 million transfer fee. The move meant that Rovers regularly fielded a side that contained two South African Internationals, the other being Aaron Mokoena who joined the club the year previous.

After a disappointing performance in the side's 3–0 defeat to Portsmouth, McCarthy found the net on his debut at Ewood Park against Everton on 23 August 2006. McCarthy further endeared himself to Rovers fans, scoring a goal on his European debut for the club in a 2–2 against Red Bull Salzburg in the UEFA Cup, and scoring another in the return leg. He finished second top scorer in the Premier League in 2006–07 with 18 league goals, as well as 24 in all competitions.

The following season got off to a poor start for McCarthy when he was stretchered off in the Premier League opening day win against Middlesbrough. McCarthy was out of action for a few weeks and found first team opportunities limited, largely because the form of new striking arrival Roque Santa Cruz. Despite being limited to largely substitute appearances, McCarthy did find the net 11 times in all competitions.

In the 2008–09 season, McCarthy appeared to be out of favour with new manager Paul Ince, as the club's strike force was strengthened with the arrivals of Carlos Villanueva and Robbie Fowler to join the already established Roque Santa Cruz, Jason Roberts and Matt Derbyshire. However, McCarthy answered these critics by scoring his first goal of the campaign – a 94th-minute equaliser in a Premier League match against Middlesbrough.

In all competitions for Blackburn, McCarthy scored 52 goals in 140 matches.

=== West Ham United ===
McCarthy completed a move to West Ham United for an undisclosed fee on transfer deadline day, 1 February 2010. He signed a two-and-a-half-year contract that was due to run until the summer of 2012. He made his Premier League debut for West Ham against Burnley at Turf Moor in a 2–1 defeat on 6 February 2010, where he sustained an injury which would keep him out for six weeks. In February 2011, having played just 326 minutes of football, making only three starts and failing to score any goals for West Ham, McCarthy was omitted from West Ham's 25-man squad for the remainder of the 2010–11 season. He was also offered a £1 million pay-off in exchange for terminating his contract prematurely. In April 2011, McCarthy left West Ham by mutual agreement after the parties agreed to terminate his contract. He made only two Premier League starts and fourteen appearances in all competitions scoring no goals.

=== Orlando Pirates ===
After leaving West Ham, McCarthy trained with former club Ajax Cape Town during the ABSA Premier League off-season. On 2 August, Orlando Pirates confirmed the signing of McCarthy on a two-year deal, ending his 14-year spell in Europe. On signing, McCarthy said, "I'm thrilled and delighted and hope I can show my appreciation by coming in and playing good football and hope to score as many goals as possible to put the team where they belong." McCarthy began the season by scoring on debut and vowed to score more goals.

McCarthy scored two goals in the final half-hour to help the Pirates defeat the Golden Arrows 4–2 on 19 May 2012 to retain their Premier League title. He finished his successful season with ten league goals, ending the campaign as the fourth leading goal-scorer in the Premier League, helping the club secure their second successive treble. Having already won a league championship with Ajax in the Netherlands as well with Porto both domestically and in Europe, McCarthy would make football history by winning the league championship with Orlando Pirates in South Africa. This meant McCarthy was the first South African footballer to win three league titles with three different football clubs on two different continents.

McCarthy, who is affectionately known as "Big Brother" by the Orlando Pirates faithful, was handed a red card for dissent in the MTN 8 secondleg semi-final played on 25 August 2012 after he charged Franklin Cale after a reckless challenge on Daine Klate. This incident lead to protesting fans whom, in their view, Cale was equally guilty in the incident and should have also been shown red. McCarthy announced his retirement from professional football on 6 June 2013, aged 35.

=== Whitehill Welfare ===
On 13 July 2014, McCarthy made a guest appearance for Scottish Lowland league club Whitehill Welfare in a pre-season friendly against a Hamilton Academical XI, scoring in the 14th minute and providing an assist for Whitehill Welfare player Kerr Dodds to score in the 20th minute. McCarthy has a connection with the club through one of the Whitehill players, John Hall.

== International career ==
McCarthy's international career began at youth level. He initially played as a winger before being converted to a striker by South Africa Under-20 head coach Ephraim Shakes Mashaba. The change proved effective, and McCarthy eventually developed into one of the most prolific strikers in South African football.

McCarthy came to international prominence at the 1997 African Youth Championship, where he emerged as a key player for the Under-20 side, finishing as the tournament's top scorer and being named Player of the Tournament. His performances during the tournament earned him a transfer to Dutch club Ajax. South Africa finished runners-up to Morocco, with McCarthy missing the final through suspension after accumulating yellow cards. Following the tournament, he was called up by senior coach Clive Barker for a friendly against the Netherlands in June 1997. McCarthy made his international debut as a substitute, playing the final 18 minutes of South Africa's 2–0 defeat and becoming the third-youngest player to represent the national team at the time. He was subsequently selected for the 1997 FIFA World Youth Championship, where South Africa were eliminated in the group stage, and made two further appearances for the senior team before the end of the year.

His performances at club level in 1997 earned McCarthy a place in South Africa's squad for the 1998 African Cup of Nations in Burkina Faso, ahead of established forwards such as Mark Williams and Shaun Bartlett. The tournament was his first major international competition with the senior national team. Despite the absence of experienced players such as Doctor Khumalo and Neil Tovey, South Africa reached the final for the second successive edition, with McCarthy playing a prominent role.

He made his African Cup of Nations debut against Angola, becoming the youngest South African to appear in the competition, a record he held until Lebohang Mokoena surpassed it in 2006 at the age of 19 years and 115 days. His debut lasted only nine minutes, as he was substituted as a precaution after receiving a yellow card for an act of petulance that had nearly earned him a sending-off. On 16 February 1998, he scored all four goals in a 4–1 victory over Namibia, becoming the first South African to score four goals in a single Africa Cup of Nations match. At 20 years and 96 days, he also became the youngest South African to score at the tournament, surpassing the previous record held by Mark Fish. The record has since been broken by Thapelo Maseko. He scored again in the quarter-final against Morocco, surpassing the previous South African record for goals at the tournament, which was jointly held by Mark Williams and John Moshoeu, while also matching Moshoeu as the South African player with the most goal contributions at major international tournaments. He then scored twice in the semi-final against the Democratic Republic of the Congo as South Africa secured a 2–1 victory after extra time. South Africa lost 2–0 to Egypt in the final, while McCarthy was named Player of the Tournament. Alongside Egyptian striker Hossam Hassan, he also finished as the tournament's joint top scorer with seven goals, making his tally the outright most ever by a South African player in a single African Cup of Nations edition.

Later in 1998, McCarthy was selected for South Africa's squad for the FIFA World Cup in France, the country's first appearance at the tournament. He made his World Cup debut on 12 June in a 3–0 defeat to hosts France, becoming the youngest South African to appear at the World Cup. Six days later, he scored the country's first goal in the competition during a 1–1 draw with Denmark, a match in which Delron Buckley also surpassed his record as South Africa's youngest World Cup participant. The result gave South Africa their first point at a World Cup, while McCarthy became the youngest South African to score at the tournament. However, the third match also ended in a draw, against Saudi Arabia, which left the South Africans in third place and eliminated from the competition.

On 16 December 1998, McCarthy scored twice in a 2–1 victory over Egypt, taking his international tally to 11 goals for the year and setting a South African record for most goals scored by a player for the national team in a calendar year. He subsequently scored in each of the next ten years through 2008, matching Shaun Bartlett's national record for scoring in the most consecutive calendar years.

McCarthy featured prominently during South Africa's qualifying campaign for the 2000 African Cup of Nations, appearing in all but one of the qualifying matches while often being unavailable for friendly fixtures. He also represented the South Africa Under-23 side in the qualifiers for the 2000 Summer Olympics. In September 1999, McCarthy announced his retirement from international football, citing the demands placed on him by the national and under-23 teams and their impact on his club career with Celta Vigo. At the time, McCarthy had already scored 13 goals in 23 internationals and was the second-highest goalscorer for the national team, behind only Phil Masinga.

As a result of his retirement, McCarthy missed the 2000 African Cup of Nations. Although the South African Football Association attempted to persuade him to return, coach Trott Moloto initially excluded him from the squad before later naming him as a standby player. Once the tournament had concluded, McCarthy was brought into Ephraim Mashaba's Under-23 squad for an Olympic qualifier against Cameroon. He scored on his international return, helping South Africa secure a 2–0 victory, and was later recalled for their final qualifier against Guinea. However, his parent club Celta Vigo initially refused to release him for the fixture, but SAFA intervened to make him available. McCarthy began the match as a substitute and came on shortly before half-time, scoring with his first touch as South Africa won 4–1 to advance to the playoffs. South Africa faced New Zealand in the playoffs and won both legs to qualify for the 2000 Summer Olympics in Sydney, with McCarthy scoring in the first half of the first leg.

McCarthy returned to the senior team in June 2000, appearing in all three of South Africa's matches at the US Cup and scoring against Mexico. The following month, he appeared in a World Cup qualifying match against Zimbabwe before being summoned to the under-23 team to participate in the 2000 Summer Olympics in Sydney. He made his debut in the competition in South Africa's opening group-stage match, a 2–1 defeat to Japan. In the team's final group match, he scored in a 2–1 defeat to Slovakia on 20 September. Despite a historic victory over Brazil in the second game, South Africa finished third in the group and were eliminated.

Following the Olympics, McCarthy was suspended for two World Cup qualifying matches in connection with an incident during the match against Zimbabwe in July. He had been accused of provoking Zimbabwe supporters while celebrating South Africa's second goal late in the match. FIFA later lifted the suspension in December, allowing McCarthy to resume his international career.

In February 2001, McCarthy became involved in another dispute with SAFA after failing to report for a World Cup qualifier against Malawi. SAFA subsequently notified FIFA of his absence, resulting in his suspension from playing for Celta Vigo in a UEFA Cup match against VfB Stuttgart of Germany and their Spanish league fixture against Alavés. He was later recalled to the national squad and played an important role in the remaining fixtures, helping South Africa finish top of their qualification group and secure qualification for the 2002 FIFA World Cup in South Korea and Japan. He also helped South Africa qualify for the 2002 African Cup of Nations.

On 15 January 2002, McCarthy scored his 17th international goal in a 1-0 home victory over Angola, leaving him one goal behind Phil Masinga's tally on South Africa's all-time scoring list. He was subsequently selected by coach Carlos Queiroz for the 2002 African Cup of Nations in Mali, returning to the competition four years after making his breakthrough at the 1998 edition in Burkina Faso. McCarthy featured in all of South Africa's matches but failed to score as the team were eliminated by hosts Mali in the quarter-finals.

Despite his disappointing tournament, McCarthy was selected by returning coach Jomo Sono for South Africa's 2002 FIFA World Cup squad. In South Africa's final warm-up match before the tournament, he scored twice in a 2–0 victory over Turkey on 23 May 2002, moving ahead of Masinga and into second place again on the country's all-time scoring list behind Shaun Bartlett.

At the World Cup, McCarthy played in all three group-stage matches. South Africa drew 2–2 with Paraguay and defeated Slovenia 1–0 before facing Spain in their final group match. McCarthy scored South Africa's equaliser in the 31st minute, but Spain eventually won 3–2, leaving South Africa third in the group and eliminating them from the tournament. His appearance against Spain was his sixth at a World Cup, taking his World Cup appearances to six and making him the most-capped South African player at the tournament at the time, alongside Lucas Radebe and Quinton Fortune. Aaron Mokoena later equalled the record. His goal also made him the joint-leading South African scorer at the World Cup alongside Shaun Bartlett and made him the first South African male player to score in more than one edition of the tournament.

However, a contract dispute with the South African Football Association (SAFA) in late 2002 once again brought McCarthy's international career to a halt. The dispute continued into 2003 over his availability for national-team matches, which frequently conflicted with his club commitments. Despite this, McCarthy reached a personal milestone in November, earning his 50th cap in a friendly against Egypt and scoring the opening goal. He became the 10th South African to reach 50 international appearances and, at 26 years and three days old, was the second youngest to reach the milestone after Mark Fish. In recognition of the achievement, McCarthy was handed the captain's armband for the following friendly against Tunisia, in which South Africa had two players sent off in a 2–0 defeat. McCarthy announced his second retirement from international football shortly before the 2004 African Cup of Nations. He returned to the national team in April 2004, but South Africa failed to qualify for the 2006 FIFA World Cup, finishing behind Ghana and the Democratic Republic of the Congo. Their third-place finish nevertheless secured qualification for the 2006 Africa Cup of Nations.

Unfortunately, the competition was a disaster for both South Africa and McCarthy. McCarthy became involved in a dispute with SAFA over player remuneration after refusing to sign the team's contract, citing the lack of prior negotiations and denying accusations that he had encouraged other players to demand more money.

He started South Africa's first two matches of the tournament against Guinea and Tunisia. Defeat against Guinea put South Africa under pressure heading into their second group match, with a win against Tunisia required to keep their hopes alive. McCarthy missed a good opportunity before his misplaced pass allowed Francileudo Dos Santos to break the deadlock in the 32nd minute. Tunisia extended their advantage after the interval when Slim Benachour finished first-time from Hatem Trabelsi's cut-back in the 58th minute, leaving South Africa facing a second consecutive defeat and elimination. Coach Ted Dumitru subsequently replaced him with Katlego Mphela for the final group match. South Africa lost all three of their group matches without scoring and were eliminated in the first round.

Following the tournament, McCarthy was criticised by some SAFA officials over his involvement in the remuneration dispute. He subsequently rejected further call-ups, accusing the federation of portraying him negatively during the tournament. McCarthy stated that he would not return to the national team until SAFA apologised.

Following the appointment of Carlos Alberto Parreira as South Africa's coach in January 2007, reports emerged of a possible return for McCarthy. He initially rejected a call-up for an African Cup of Nations qualification match against Chad, maintaining his position in the dispute with SAFA. After South Africa's 1–0 friendly defeat to Scotland in August 2007, Parreira travelled to England to meet McCarthy in an effort to resolve the disagreement and persuade him to return to the national team. The meeting was successful, and McCarthy returned in September. He scored on his return against Zambia in a 2008 Africa Cup of Nations qualifier. The goal helped South Africa qualify for the tournament as one of the three best runners-up and brought McCarthy level with Shaun Bartlett's tally of 29 international goals. However, he was not included in the squad for the final tournament.

On 26 March 2008, McCarthy scored his 30th international goal in a 3–0 friendly victory over Paraguay, surpassing Bartlett to become South Africa's all-time leading goalscorer. Bartlett was present at the match to witness the achievement, while McCarthy's Blackburn Rovers teammate Aaron Mokoena earned his 74th cap, equalling Bartlett's record for most appearances at the time.

On 19 August 2008, McCarthy set a new record for the longest international career by a South African player, spanning 11 years and 76 days, when he featured in a 2–2 draw with Australia. He surpassed the previous record held by John Moshoeu, which had stood for four years. In his following appearance, McCarthy captained South Africa in a 2010 Africa Cup of Nations qualifier against Nigeria. South Africa lost the match 1–0, a result that ended their hopes of qualifying for the tournament. McCarthy scored his 31st and final international goal on 15 October 2008, finding the net in a 2–1 home victory over Ghana. The goal came on his 74th appearance for South Africa, drawing him level with Shaun Bartlett as the country's joint-second most-capped player at the time.

Joel Santana took charge of the South African national team in 2008 after Carlos Alberto Parreira resigned for personal reasons. The following year, Santana left McCarthy out of the squad for the 2009 FIFA Confederations Cup. McCarthy's omission came after he had withdrawn from friendly matches against Norway and Portugal in March, citing a hamstring injury. Santana subsequently questioned McCarthy's commitment to international duty.

Parreira returned as head coach in October 2009 and immediately recalled McCarthy to the national team, starting him in friendlies against Japan and Jamaica. McCarthy did not feature for South Africa again until 27 May 2010, when he came on as a substitute against Colombia in the team's third-to-last friendly before the World Cup. However, amid concerns over his fitness and criticism in South Africa regarding his weight, McCarthy was omitted from the final 23-man squad for the 2010 FIFA World Cup, announced on 1 June 2010.

Prior to the 2010 World Cup, held in South Africa, McCarthy announced his support for the Gun-Free World Cup campaign being run by International Action Network on Small Arms. He said, "This World Cup will be the biggest in football history and the fact that it is taking place in South Africa is a chance for us to show the world everything that is good about our country. It's great that guns will be banned from stadiums – it's going to be a fantastic party, and guns have no place in that."

== Managerial career ==
=== Hibernian ===
Living in Edinburgh since 2013, McCarthy confirmed in April 2015, that he had joined the coaching staff of Alan Stubbs at Scottish club Hibernian. Stubbs had invited McCarthy so he could just learn the coaching side of things. McCarthy knew Stubbs back from their playing days when McCarthy was at Blackburn Rovers and Stubbs was at Everton. McCarthy said, that he was going to help out with the U20s, and assisting with the first team.

=== Sint-Truiden ===
In February 2015, he did a short internship at Sint-Truidense under Yannick Ferrera. On 8 September 2015, McCarthy was appointed assistant manager to manager Chris O'Loughlin, who replaced Yannick Ferrera. Working his way through the different tiers of the UEFA Coaching Badges system, McCarthy met O'Loughlin.

On 20 April 2016, McCarthy stopped working with Sint-Truiden for personal reasons, after it was previously announced that his contract was not renewed.

=== Cape Town City ===
On 13 June 2017, McCarthy was unveiled as the new Cape Town City head coach, replacing Eric Tinkler, who moved to manage SuperSport United. McCarthy would complete his UEFA Pro License while coaching City, and would win his first silverware as a coach in 2018 when he guided City to the MTN 8 cup. On 4 November 2019, McCarthy was dismissed as head coach of Cape Town City after just two wins in 18 games.

=== AmaZulu ===
On 14 December 2020, McCarthy was unveiled as the new AmaZulu head coach, replacing Ayanda Dlamini, who stepped down from the position on 7 December 2020. He took the club to a second-place finish in the DStv Premiership, a record high for AmaZulu in the modern era of the game in South Africa. As a result, AmaZulu qualified for the preliminary rounds of the 2021–22 CAF Champions League. McCarthy led AmaZulu to the group stages of the 2021–22 CAF Champions League in their debut season before exiting the competition. McCarthy and AmaZulu parted company on 25 March 2022.

=== Manchester United ===
On 30 July 2022, McCarthy was appointed as a first-team striker's coach at Manchester United. Benni McCarthy's contract with Manchester United ended on 27 June 2024. McCarthy chose not to renew his two-year contract so he could return to being a head coach.

=== Kenya ===
On 3 March, 2025, McCarthy was named as Kenya national football team head coach in an event graced by Kenya Olympic Committee President, Paul Tergat, FKF president Hussein Mohammed, his deputy McDonald Mariga and Odibets GM Dedan M.

== Personal life ==
In 2004, McCarthy married Maria Santos from Spain. They have three daughters together: Minna, Mya and Allegra. In 2007, they separated. In May 2014, McCarthy married Scottish model Stacey Munro. Together, they have one daughter, Lima Rose, born 2012 and one son, Lio Romero, born in 2019.

== In popular culture ==
In 1998, McCarthy collaborated with South African kwaito music group TKZee in "Shibobo". The song released in the run-up to the 1998 World Cup in France samples greatly on "The Final Countdown" by Europe and features McCarthy rapping part of the lyrics. He also appears in the football-themed music video for the song. Sales of the single topped the 100,000 mark in just over a month in South Africa, making "Shibobo" the fastest and biggest selling CD single by TKZee or other South African recording artists. The song was also a hit in other African music charts. The song enjoyed a comeback in a re-release in 2010–11.

== Career statistics ==
=== Club ===
Appearances and goals by club, season and competition
Club	Season	League			National cup (Note: Includes KNVB Cup, Copa del Rey, Taça de Portugal, FA Cup)		League cup (Note: Includes Football League Cup)		Continental		Other		Total	
Club	Season	Division	Apps	Goals	Apps	Goals	Apps	Goals	Apps	Goals	Apps	Goals	Apps	Goals
Ajax	1997–98	Eredivisie	17	9	1	0	–		5 (Note: Appearances in UEFA Cup)	1	–		23	10
Ajax	1998–99	Eredivisie	19	11	1	0	–		5 (Note: Appearances in UEFA Champions League)	0	0	0	25	11
Ajax	Total		36	20	2	0	–		10	1	0	0	48	21
Celta Vigo	1999–2000	La Liga	31	8	4	2	–		10	6	–		45	16
Celta Vigo	2000–01	La Liga	19	0	2	0	–		6	0	–		27	0
Celta Vigo	2001–02	La Liga	2	0	0	0	–		3	1	–		5	1
Celta Vigo	2002–03	La Liga	14	2	0	0	–		5	3	–		19	5
Celta Vigo	Total		66	10	6	2	–		24	10	–		96	22
Porto (loan)	2001–02	Primeira Liga	11	12	1	1	–		–		–		12	13
Porto	2003–04	Primeira Liga	29	20	5	1	–		11	4	2 (Note: One appearance in Supertaça Cândido de Oliveira, one appearance in UEFA Super Cup)	0	47	25
Porto	2004–05	Primeira Liga	23	11	1	0	–		8	3	3 (Note: One appearance in Supertaça Cândido de Oliveira, one appearance in UEFA Super Cup, one appearance in Intercontinental Cup)	0	35	14
Porto	2005–06	Primeira Liga	23	3	4	3	–		4	1	–		31	7
Porto	Total		86	46	11	5	–		23	8	5	0	124	58
Blackburn Rovers	2006–07	Premier League	36	18	5	3	1	0	8	3	–		50	24
Blackburn Rovers	2007–08	Premier League	31	8	1	0	2	1	4	2	–		38	11
Blackburn Rovers	2008–09	Premier League	28	10	5	3	0	0	–		–		33	13
Blackburn Rovers	2009–10	Premier League	14	1	0	0	5	3	–		–		19	4
Blackburn Rovers	Total		109	37	11	6	8	4	12	5	–		140	52
West Ham United	2009–10	Premier League	5	0	0	0	0	0	–		–		5	0
West Ham United	2010–11	Premier League	6	0	0	0	3	0	–		–		9	0
West Ham United	Total		11	0	0	0	3	0	–		–		14	0
Career total			308	113	30	13	11	4	69	24	5	0	422	153

=== International ===
Scores and results list South Africa's goal tally first, score column indicates score after each McCarthy goal.

List of international goals scored by Benni McCarthy
No.	Date	Venue	Opponent	Score	Result	Competition
1	16 February 1998	Stade Municipal, Bobo-Dioulasso, Burkina Faso	Namibia	1–0	4–0	1998 African Cup of Nations
2	16 February 1998	Stade Municipal, Bobo-Dioulasso, Burkina Faso	Namibia	2–0	4–0	1998 African Cup of Nations
3	16 February 1998	Stade Municipal, Bobo-Dioulasso, Burkina Faso	Namibia	3–0	4–0	1998 African Cup of Nations
4	16 February 1998	Stade Municipal, Bobo-Dioulasso, Burkina Faso	Namibia	4–0	4–0	1998 African Cup of Nations
5	22 February 1998	Stade Municipal, Ouagadougou, Burkina Faso	Morocco	1–0	2–1	1998 African Cup of Nations
6	25 February 1998	Stade du 4 Août, Ouagadougou, Burkina Faso	DR Congo	1–1	2–1	1998 African Cup of Nations
7	25 February 1998	Stade du 4 Août, Ouagadougou, Burkina Faso	DR Congo	2–1	2–1	1998 African Cup of Nations
8	6 June 1998	Sportanlage Baiersbronn, Baiersbronn, Germany	Iceland	1–0	1–1	Friendly
9	18 June 1998	Stade de Toulouse, Toulouse, France	Denmark	1–1	1–1	1998 FIFA World Cup
10	16 December 1998	FNB Stadium, Johannesburg, South Africa	Egypt	1–1	2–1	Friendly
11	16 December 1998	FNB Stadium, Johannesburg, South Africa	Egypt	2–1	2–1	Friendly
12	27 February 1999	Odi Stadium, Mabopane, South Africa	Gabon	4–1	4–1	2000 African Cup of Nations qualification
13	5 June 1999	Kings Park Stadium, Durban, South Africa	Mauritius	2–0	2–0	2000 African Cup of Nations qualification
14	7 June 2000	Cotton Bowl, Dallas, United States	Mexico	1–2	2–4	Friendly
15	11 June 2000	Giants Stadium, New York City, United States	Republic of Ireland	1–0	1–2	Friendly
16	24 March 2001	Telkom Park Stadium, Port Elizabeth, South Africa	Mauritius	1–0	3–0	2002 African Cup of Nations qualification
17	5 May 2001	FNB Stadium, Johannesburg, South Africa	Zimbabwe	2–0	2–1	2002 FIFA World Cup qualification
18	15 January 2002	Mmabatho Stadium, Mafikeng, South Africa	Angola	1–0	1–0	Friendly
19	23 May 2002	Hong Kong Stadium, Hong Kong	Turkey	1–0	2–0	Friendly
20	23 May 2002	Hong Kong Stadium, Hong Kong	Turkey	2–0	2–0	Friendly
21	12 June 2002	Daejeon World Cup Stadium, Daejeon, South Korea	Spain	1–1	2–3	2002 FIFA World Cup
22	22 May 2003	Kings Park Stadium, Durban, South Africa	England	1–1	1–2	Friendly
23	15 November 2003	Cairo International Stadium, Cairo, Egypt	Egypt	1–0	1–2	Friendly
24	18 August 2004	Tunis, Tunisia	Tunisia	1–0	2–0	Friendly
25	10 October 2004	National Stadium, Kampala, Uganda	Uganda	1–0	1–0	2006 FIFA World Cup qualification
26	9 February 2005	Kings Park Stadium, Durban, South Africa	Australia	1–0	1–1	Friendly
27	4 June 2005	Estádio da Várzea, Praia, Cape Verde	Cape Verde	1–0	2–1	2006 FIFA World Cup qualification
28	7 September 2005	Weserstadion, Bremen, Germany	Germany	2–3	2–4	Friendly
29	14 January 2006	Cairo International Stadium, Cairo, Egypt	Egypt	2–1	2–1	Friendly
30	8 September 2007	Newlands Stadium, Cape Town, South Africa	Zambia	1–3	1–3	2008 Africa Cup of Nations qualification
31	26 March 2008	Lucas Masterpieces Moripe Stadium, Pretoria, South Africa	Paraguay	2–0	3–0	Friendly
32	15 October 2008	Free State Stadium, Bloemfontein, South Africa	Ghana	1–1	2–1	Friendly

=== Managerial ===
As of 18 March 2022

Team	From	To	Record				
Team	From	To	G	W	D	L	Win %
Cape Town City	13 June 2017	3 November 2019	89	37	21	31	41.57
AmaZulu	14 December 2020	25 March 2022	60	23	22	15	38.33
Total			149	60	43	46	40.27

== Honours ==
=== Player ===
Ajax

- Eredivisie: 1997–98
- KNVB Cup: 1997–98, 1998–99

Celta Vigo

- UEFA Intertoto Cup: 2000

Porto

- Primeira Liga: 2003–04, 2005–06
- Taça de Portugal: 2005–06
- Supertaça Cândido de Oliveira: 2003, 2004
- UEFA Champions League: 2003–04
- Intercontinental Cup: 2004

Orlando Pirates

- Premier League: 2011–12
- MTN 8: 2011
- Telkom Knockout: 2011

South Africa

- African Cup of Nations runner-up: 1998
- Afro-Asian Cup of Nations: 1997
- Reunification Cup: 2002

Individual

- African Cup of Nations Best Player: 1998
- African Cup of Nations Top Scorer: 1998 (shared with Hossam Hassan)
- African Cup of Nations Team of the Tournament: 1998
- African Goal of the Year: 2004
- Ajax Talent of the Year (Marco van Basten Award): 1997–98
- SJPF Player of the Month: January 2004, May 2004, October 2004
- Primeira Liga Top Scorer: 2003–04
- Taça de Portugal Top Scorer: 2005–06

=== Manager ===
Cape Town City

- MTN 8: 2018

== Discography ==
=== Singles ===
- 1998: "Shibobo" by TKZee featuring Benni McCarthy
