= Mohlala =

Mohlala is an African surname that may refer to

- Jimmy Mohlala (died 2009), South African football striker
- Lovers Mohlala, (born 1975), South African former footballer
- Mathibe Mohlala, South African politician
