= HKSAR Reunification Cup =

HKSAR Reunification Cup is a cup competition for celebrating the reunification of Hong Kong to China from finishing the colonial rule by United Kingdom. The first edition of the cup was held on 3 July 1997, two days after the Day of Establishment of HKSAR. The second edition was featured by a 4-team competition held on the 5th anniversary in 2002. The third edition was held in 2007 for celebrating the 10th anniversary.

== 1997 ==
3 July 1997

FIFA World Stars	5–3	AFC All-Stars
George Weah 18'; Alfonso Pérez 25'; Hakan Şükür 32'; Claudio Reyna 53'; Jean-Pierre Papin 68'	(Report)	Khodadad Azizi 11'; Al-Enazi 74'; Karim Bagheri 79'

Hong Kong Stadium
Attendance: 23,000
Referee: Ali Bujsaim (United Arab Emirates)
Squads

FIFA World Stars

- Team coaches: (Federal Republic of Yugoslavia) Bora Milutinović and (Slovakia) Jozef Vengloš

No.	Pos.	Player	Date of birth (age)	Caps	Club
	GK	(Germany) Andreas Köpke	12 March 1962 (aged 35)		(France) Marseille
	GK	(South Africa) Andre Arendse	27 June 1967 (aged 30)		(South Africa) Ajax Cape Town
	DF	(Spain) Fernando Hierro	23 March 1968 (aged 29)		(Spain) Real Madrid
	DF	(Netherlands) Frank Verlaat	8 March 1968 (aged 29)		(Germany) VfB Stuttgart
	DF	(Germany) Lothar Matthäus	21 March 1961 (aged 36)		(Germany) Bayern Munich
	MF	(Brazil) Dunga	31 October 1963 (aged 33)		(Japan) Júbilo Iwata
	MF	(Uzbekistan) Sergey Lebedev *	31 January 1969 (aged 28)		(Uzbekistan) Neftchi Farg'ona
	MF	(Brazil) Zé Elias	25 September 1976 (aged 20)		(Italy) Internazionale
	MF	(United States) Claudio Reyna	20 July 1973 (aged 23)		(Germany) VfL Wolfsburg
	MF	(South Korea) Ha Seok-Ju *	20 February 1968 (aged 29)		(South Korea) Busan Daewoo Royals
	FW	(Liberia) George Weah	1 October 1966 (aged 30)		(Italy) A.C. Milan
	FW	(Turkey) Hakan Şükür	1 September 1971 (aged 25)		(Turkey) Galatasaray
	FW	(France) Jean-Pierre Papin	5 November 1963 (aged 33)		(France) Bordeaux
	FW	(Spain) Alfonso	26 September 1972 (aged 24)		(Spain) Real Betis

* Borrowed from AFC All-Star

AFC All-Stars

- Team coach: (Hong Kong) Kwok Ka Ming

No.	Pos.	Player	Date of birth (age)	Caps	Club
	GK	(Saudi Arabia) Mohamed Al-Deayea	2 August 1972 (aged 24)		(Saudi Arabia) Al-Ta'ee
	GK	(China) Ou Chuliang	26 August 1968 (aged 28)		(China) Guangdong Hongyuan
	DF	(Saudi Arabia) Mohammed Al-Jahani	28 September 1974 (aged 22)		(Saudi Arabia) Al-Ahli
	DF	(Japan) Masami Ihara	18 September 1967 (aged 29)		(Japan) Yokohama Marinos
	DF	(China) Fan Zhiyi	22 January 1970 (aged 27)		(China) Shanghai Shenhua
	DF	(Thailand) Dusit Chalermsan	22 April 1970 (aged 27)		(Thailand) BEC Tero Sasana
	DF	(Hong Kong) Chan Chi Keung			(Hong Kong) Happy Valley
	MF	(Syria) Mohammad Nasser Afash	31 October 1971 (aged 25)		(Greece) Ionikos
	MF	(Iran) Karim Bagheri	20 February 1974 (aged 23)		(Germany) Arminia Bielefeld
	FW	(Iran) Ali Daei	21 March 1969 (aged 28)		(Germany) Arminia Bielefeld
	FW	(Iran) Khodadad Azizi	22 June 1971 (aged 26)		(Germany) 1. FC Köln
	FW	(China) Hao Haidong	25 August 1970 (aged 26)		(China) Dalian Shide
	FW	(Qatar) Mohammed Salem Al-Enazi	22 November 1976 (aged 20)		(Saudi Arabia) Al Nassr FC
		(United Arab Emirates) Mohamed Ali Ahmed Mohamed			

== 2002 ==
=== Squads ===
Hong Kong League XI

No.	Pos.	Player	Date of birth (age)	Caps	Club
	GK	(Hong Kong) Chan Ka Ki	25 April 1979 (aged 23)		(Hong Kong) South China
	GK	(Hong Kong) Fan Chun Yip	1 May 1976 (aged 26)		(Hong Kong) Happy Valley
	DF	(Hong Kong) Lo Kai Wah	27 January 1971 (aged 31)		(Hong Kong) Happy Valley
	DF	(Hong Kong) Yau Kin Wai	4 January 1973 (aged 29)		(Hong Kong) South China
	DF	(Brazil) Cristiano Cordeiro	14 August 1973 (aged 28)		(Hong Kong) South China
	DF	(Brazil) Carlo André			(Hong Kong) Sun Hei
	DF	(Hong Kong) Lee Wai Man	18 August 1973 (aged 28)		(Hong Kong) Happy Valley
	DF	(Cameroon) Gerard	21 September 1978 (aged 23)		(Hong Kong) Happy Valley
	DF	(Hong Kong) Luk Koon Pong	1 August 1978 (aged 23)		(Hong Kong) South China
	DF	(Hong Kong) Poon Yiu Cheuk	19 September 1977 (aged 24)		(Hong Kong) Happy Valley
	MF	(Nigeria) Cornelius Udebuluzor	27 August 1974 (aged 27)		(Hong Kong) Buler Rangers
	MF	(England) Gary McKeown	19 October 1970 (aged 31)		(Hong Kong) Sun Hei
	MF	(Hong Kong) Shum Kwok Pui	11 August 1970 (aged 31)		(Hong Kong) South China
	MF	(Brazil) Filho	25 June 1969 (aged 32)		(Hong Kong) South China
	MF	(Hong Kong) Cheng Siu Chung	29 September 1972 (aged 29)		(Hong Kong) South China
	MF	(Hong Kong) Yeung Ching Kwong	7 May 1976 (aged 26)		(Hong Kong) South China
	FW	(Hong Kong) Yeung Hei Chi	13 February 1975 (aged 27)		(Hong Kong) Sun Hei
	FW	(Brazil) Anílton da Conceição	15 March 1976 (aged 26)		(Hong Kong) Buler Rangers
	FW	(Hong Kong) Kwok Man Tik	16 July 1978 (aged 23)		(Hong Kong) Happy Valley
	FW	(Hong Kong) Chan Ho Man	14 May 1980 (aged 22)		(Hong Kong) South China

Scotland

No.	Pos.	Player	Date of birth (age)	Caps	Club
	GK	Neil Alexander	10 March 1978 (aged 24)		(Wales) Cardiff City
	GK	Robert Douglas	24 April 1972 (aged 30)		(Scotland) Celtic
	GK	Paul Gallacher	16 August 1979 (aged 22)		(Scotland) Dundee United
	DF	Gary Caldwell	12 April 1982 (aged 20)		(England) Newcastle United
	DF	Warren Cummings	15 October 1980 (aged 21)		(England) Chelsea
	DF	Christian Dailly	23 October 1973 (aged 28)		(England) West Ham United
	DF	Callum Davidson	25 June 1976 (aged 25)		(England) Leicester City
	DF	Maurice Ross	3 February 1981 (aged 21)		(Scotland) Rangers
	DF	Robbie Stockdale	30 November 1979 (aged 22)		(England) Middlesbrough
	DF	David Weir	10 May 1970 (aged 32)		(England) Everton
	DF	Lee Wilkie	20 April 1980 (aged 22)		(Scotland) Dundee
	MF	Graham Alexander	10 October 1971 (aged 30)		(England) Preston North End
	MF	Scot Gemmill	2 January 1971 (aged 31)		(England) Everton
	MF	James McFadden	14 April 1983 (aged 19)		(Scotland) Motherwell
	MF	Kevin McNaughton	28 August 1982 (aged 19)		(Scotland) Aberdeen
	MF	Scott Severin	15 February 1979 (aged 23)		(Scotland) Hearts
	MF	Michael Stewart	26 February 1981 (aged 21)		(England) Manchester United
	MF	Gareth Williams	16 December 1981 (aged 20)		(England) Nottingham Forest
	FW	Scott Dobie	10 October 1978 (aged 23)		(England) West Bromwich Albion
	FW	Allan Johnston	14 December 1973 (aged 28)		(England) Middlesbrough
	FW	Kevin Kyle	7 June 1981 (aged 20)		(England) Sunderland
	FW	Gary O'Connor	7 May 1983 (aged 19)		(Scotland) Hibernian
	FW	Steven Thompson	14 October 1978 (aged 23)		(Scotland) Dundee United

South Africa

No.	Pos.	Player	Date of birth (age)	Caps	Club
	GK	Emille Baron	17 June 1979 (aged 22)		(Norway) Lillestrøm
	GK	Hans Vonk	30 January 1970 (aged 32)		(Netherlands) Heerenveen
	GK	Calvin Marlin	20 April 1976 (aged 26)		(South Africa) Ajax Cape Town
	GK	André Arendse	27 June 1967 (aged 34)		(South Africa) Santos Cape Town
	DF	Aaron Mokoena	25 November 1980 (aged 21)		(Belgium) Germinal Beerschot
	DF	Pierre Issa	12 September 1975 (aged 26)		(England) Watford
	DF	Thabang Molefe	11 April 1979 (aged 23)		(South Africa) Jomo Cosmos
	DF	Matthew Booth	14 March 1977 (aged 25)		(South Africa) Mamelodi Sundowns
	DF	Mark Fish	14 March 1974 (aged 28)		(England) Charlton Athletic
	DF	Cyril Nzama	26 June 1974 (aged 27)		(South Africa) Kaizer Chiefs
	DF	Mbulelo Old-John Mabizela	18 July 1983 (aged 18)		(South Africa) Orlando Pirates
	DF	Lovers Mohlala	2 December 1976 (aged 25)		(South Africa) Mamelodi Sundowns
	DF	Bradley Carnell	21 January 1977 (aged 25)		(Germany) VfB Stuttgart
	DF	Jacob Lekgetho	24 March 1974 (aged 28)		(Russia) Lokomotiv Moscow
	DF	Lucas Radebe	12 April 1969 (aged 33)		(England) Leeds United
	MF	Sibusiso Zuma	23 June 1975 (aged 26)		(Denmark) Copenhagen
	MF	Jabu Pule	11 July 1980 (aged 21)		(South Africa) Kaizer Chiefs
	MF	MacDonald Mukansi	26 May 1975 (aged 26)		(Bulgaria) Lokomotiv Sofia
	MF	MacBeth Sibaya	25 November 1977 (aged 24)		(South Africa) Jomo Cosmos
	MF	Thabo Mngomeni	24 June 1969 (aged 32)		(South Africa) Orlando Pirates
	MF	Bennett Mnguni	18 March 1974 (aged 28)		(Russia) Lokomotiv Moscow
	MF	Delron Buckley	7 December 1977 (aged 24)		(Germany) VfL Bochum
	MF	Quinton Fortune	21 May 1977 (aged 24)		(England) Manchester United
	MF	Steven Pienaar	17 March 1982 (aged 20)		(Netherlands) Ajax
	MF	Teboho Mokoena	10 July 1974 (aged 27)		(Switzerland) St. Gallen
	FW	Siyabonga Nomvethe	2 December 1977 (aged 24)		(Italy) Udinese
	FW	Benni McCarthy	12 November 1977 (aged 24)		(Portugal) Porto
	FW	George Koumantarakis	27 March 1974 (aged 28)		(Switzerland) Basel
	FW	Shaun Bartlett	30 October 1972 (aged 29)		(England) Charlton Athletic
	FW	Clement Mazibuko	16 September 1977 (aged 24)		(South Africa) Bush Bucks

Turkey

No.	Pos.	Player	Date of birth (age)	Caps	Club
	GK	Rüştü Reçber	10 May 1973 (aged 29)		(Turkey) Fenerbahçe
	GK	Ömer Çatkıç	15 October 1974 (aged 27)		(Turkey) Gaziantepspor
	GK	Zafer Özgültekin	10 March 1975 (aged 27)		(Turkey) Ankaragücü
	GK	Metin Aktas	1 August 1977 (aged 24)		(Turkey) Trabzonspor
	DF	Alpay Özalan	29 May 1973 (aged 28)		(England) Aston Villa
	MF	Abdullah Ercan	8 December 1971 (aged 30)		(Turkey) Fenerbahçe
	DF	Ümit Özat	30 October 1976 (aged 25)		(Turkey) Fenerbahçe
	DF	Emre Aşık	13 December 1973 (aged 28)		(Turkey) Galatasaray
	DF	Bülent Korkmaz	24 November 1968 (aged 33)		(Turkey) Galatasaray
	DF	Hakan Ünsal	14 May 1973 (aged 29)		(England) Blackburn Rovers
	DF	Fatih Akyel	26 December 1977 (aged 24)		(Turkey) Fenerbahçe
	DF	Ümit Davala	30 July 1973 (aged 28)		(Italy) A.C. Milan
	MF	Tayfur Havutçu	23 April 1970 (aged 32)		(Turkey) Beşiktaş
	MF	Nihat Kahveci	23 November 1979 (aged 22)		(Spain) Real Sociedad
	MF	Tugay Kerimoğlu	24 August 1970 (aged 31)		(England) Blackburn Rovers
	MF	Ergün Penbe	17 May 1972 (aged 30)		(Turkey) Galatasaray
	MF	Cihan Haspolatli	4 January 1980 (aged 22)		(Turkey) Kocaelispor
	MF	Emre Belözoğlu	7 September 1980 (aged 21)		(Italy) Internazionale Milano F.C.
	MF	Okan Buruk	19 October 1973 (aged 28)		(Italy) Internazionale Milano F.C.
	MF	Tayfun Korkut	2 April 1974 (aged 28)		(Spain) Real Sociedad
	MF	Mustafa İzzet	31 October 1974 (aged 27)		(England) Leicester City
	FW	Yıldıray Baştürk	24 December 1978 (aged 23)		(Germany) Bayer 04 Leverkusen
	FW	İlhan Mansız	10 August 1975 (aged 26)		(Turkey) Beşiktaş
	FW	Arif Erdem	2 January 1972 (aged 30)		(Turkey) Galatasaray
	FW	Serhat Akın	5 June 1981 (aged 20)		(Turkey) Fenerbahçe
	FW	Hasan Şaş	1 August 1976 (aged 25)		(Turkey) Galatasaray
	FW	Hakan Şükür	1 September 1971 (aged 30)		(Italy) Parma F.C.

=== Results ===
Team	Pts	Pld	W	D	L	GF	GA	GD
South Africa	6	2	2	0	0	4	0	+4
Scotland	3	2	1	0	1	4	2	+2
Turkey	3	2	1	0	1	2	2	0
Hong Kong League XI	0	2	0	0	2	0	6	−6

20 May 2002

South Africa	2–0	Scotland
Teboho Mokoena 30'; George Koumantarakis 93'

Mong Kok Stadium
Attendance: 3,007
Referee: Chan Siu Kee (Hong Kong)

20 May 2002

Hong Kong League XI	0–2	Turkey
		Hakan Şükür 21' (pen.); Hasan Şaş 45'

Hong Kong Stadium
Referee: Hamlumyoung Panya (Thailand)

23 May 2002

Hong Kong League XI	0–4	Scotland
		Kevin Kyle 22'; Steven Thompson 36'; Christian Dailly 50'; Scot Gemmill 71'

Hong Kong Stadium
Attendance: 8,000
Referee: Krishnan Ramachandran (Malaysia)

23 May 2002

South Africa	2–0	Turkey
Benni McCarthy 58', 92'

Hong Kong Stadium
Attendance: 10,000
Referee: Yau Fat Jame Fong (Hong Kong)

== 2007 ==
=== China Hong Kong Stars Cup ===
2007-07-01
12:30 GMT+8

Hong Kong All Star Sports Association	3–3	China All Star Soccer Team

Hong Kong Stadium
Attendance: 38,077

=== Lee Shau Kee Cup ===
2007-07-01
14:35 GMT+8

Bayern Munich	2–1	São Paulo
Klose 60'; Hamit Altıntop 77'	(Report)	Marcel 19'

Hong Kong Stadium
Attendance: 38,077
Squads

Bayern Munich

- Team coach: (Germany) Ottmar Hitzfeld

No.	Pos.	Player	Date of birth (age)	Caps	Club
1	GK	(Germany) Oliver Kahn	15 June 1969 (age 38)		(Germany) Bayern Munich
5	DF	(Belgium) Daniel van Buyten	2 July 1978 (age 28)		(Germany) Bayern Munich
6	DF	(Argentina) Martin Demichelis	20 December 1980 (age 26)		(Germany) Bayern Munich
8	MF	(Turkey) Hamit Altıntop	8 December 1982 (age 26)		(Germany) Bayern Munich
11	DF	(Germany) Stefano Celozzi	2 November 1988 (age 18)		(Germany) Bayern Munich
16	MF	(Germany) Andreas Ottl	1 March 1985 (age 21)		(Germany) Bayern Munich
17	MF	(Netherlands) Mark van Bommel	22 April 1977 (age 30)		(Germany) Bayern Munich
18	FW	(Germany) Miroslav Klose	9 June 1978 (age 29)		(Germany) Bayern Munich
20	MF	(Argentina) José Sosa	19 June 1985 (age 22)		(Germany) Bayern Munich
21	DF	(Germany) Philipp Lahm	11 November 1983 (age 23)		(Germany) Bayern Munich
22	GK	(Germany) Michael Rensing	14 May 1984 (age 23)		(Germany) Bayern Munich
27	FW	(Austria) Daniel Sikorski	2 November 1987 (age 19)		(Germany) Bayern Munich
32	DF	(Germany) Mats Hummels	16 December 1988 (age 18)		(Germany) Bayern Munich
34	MF	(Germany) Sandro Wagner	29 November 1987 (age 19)		(Germany) Bayern Munich
36	MF	(Germany) Stephan Fuerstner	11 September 1987 (age 19)		(Germany) Bayern Munich
37	DF	(Ghana) Christian Saba	29 December 1987 (age 19)		(Germany) Bayern Munich
	GK	(Germany) Bernd Dreher	2 November 1966 (age 40)		(Germany) Bayern Munich
	DF	(Brazil) Lúcio	8 May 1978 (age 29)		(Germany) Bayern Munich
	DF	(Germany) Marcell Jansen	4 November 1985 (age 21)		(Germany) Bayern Munich
	DF	(Germany) Christian Lell	29 August 1984 (age 22)		(Germany) Bayern Munich
	FW	(Cameroon) Louis Ngwat-Mahop	16 September 1987 (age 19)		(Germany) Bayern Munich

São Paulo

No.	Pos.	Player	Date of birth (age)	Caps	Club
1	GK	(Brazil) Bosco	14 November 1974 (age 32)		(Brazil) São Paulo
2	DF	(Brazil) Maurinho	11 October 1978 (age 28)		(Brazil) São Paulo
3	DF	(Brazil) Aislan	11 January 1988 (age 19)		(Brazil) São Paulo
4	MF	(Brazil) Alex Cazumba	30 June 1988 (age 19)		(Brazil) São Paulo
5		Bruno			(Brazil) São Paulo
6	FW	(Brazil) Eric	8 March 1989 (age 18)		(Brazil) São Paulo
7	DF	(Brazil) Carlinhos	18 January 1986 (age 21)		(Brazil) São Paulo
8		Luan			(Brazil) São Paulo
9	FW	(Brazil) Marcel	12 November 1981 (age 25)		(Brazil) São Paulo
10	MF	(Brazil) Rafinha	4 August 1983 (age 23)		(Brazil) São Paulo
11	MF	(Brazil) Francisco Alex	23 December 1983 (age 23)		(Brazil) São Paulo
12	GK	Alex			(Brazil) São Paulo
13		Jackson			(Brazil) São Paulo
14		Serinho			(Brazil) São Paulo
16	MF	(Brazil) Sergio Mota	16 November 1989 (age 17)		(Brazil) São Paulo
17		Leonardo Goncalves			(Brazil) São Paulo
18		Thiago			(Brazil) São Paulo
	GK	(Brazil) Mateus	9 April 1983 (age 24)		(Brazil) São Paulo
	DF	(Brazil) Breno	13 October 1989 (age 17)		(Brazil) São Paulo
	DF	(Brazil) Edcarlos	10 May 1985 (age 22)		(Brazil) São Paulo
	DF	(Brazil) Flávio	16 January 1984 (age 23)		(Brazil) São Paulo
	DF	(Brazil) Júnior	20 June 1973 (age 34)		(Brazil) São Paulo
	DF	(Ecuador) Néicer Reasco	23 July 1977 (age 29)		(Brazil) São Paulo
	MF	(Brazil) Chumbinho	21 September 1986 (age 20)		(Brazil) São Paulo
	MF	(Brazil) Fredson	22 February 1981 (age 26)		(Brazil) São Paulo
	MF	(Brazil) Lenílson	1 May 1981 (age 26)		(Brazil) São Paulo

=== Henderson Reunification Cup ===
2007-07-01
17:15 GMT+8

Hong Kong and China Team	2–0	FIFA World Stars Team
Zhao Xuri 41'; Shao Jiayi 52'	(Report)

Hong Kong Stadium
Attendance: 38,077
Referee: Cheung Yim Yau (Hong Kong)
Squads

Hong Kong and China Team

- Team coach: (China) Zhu Guanghu

No.	Pos.	Player	Date of birth (age)	Caps	Club
1	GK	(China) Li Leilei	30 June 1977 (age 30)		(China) Shandong Luneng
29	GK	(China) Yang Zhi	15 January 1983 (age 24)		(China) Beijing Guoan
31	GK	(Hong Kong) Fan Chun Yip	1 May 1976 (age 31)		(Hong Kong) Happy Valley
42	GK	(China) Yang Jun	10 June 1981 (age 26)		(China) Tianjin Teda
45	GK	(China) Zong Lei	26 July 1981 (age 25)		(China) Changchun Yatai
	GK	(China) Chen Dong	3 May 1978 (age 29)		(China) Dalian Shide
3	DF	(China) Li Weifeng	26 January 1978 (age 29)		(China) Shanghai Shenhua
8	DF	(China) Du Wei	9 February 1982 (age 25)		(China) Shanghai Shenhua
9	DF	(China) Ji Mingyi	15 December 1980 (age 26)		(China) Dalian Shide
13	DF	(China) Zhang Yaokun	7 April 1981 (age 26)		(China) Dalian Shide
18	DF	(China) Zhang Shuai	20 July 1981 (age 25)		(China) Beijing Guoan
19	DF	(China) Sun Jihai	30 September 1977 (age 29)		(England) Manchester City
21	DF	(China) Sun Xiang	15 January 1982 (age 25)		(China) Shanghai Shenhua
32	DF	(Hong Kong) Poon Yiu Cheuk	19 September 1977 (age 29)		(Hong Kong) Happy Valley
33	DF	(Hong Kong) Man Pei Tak	16 February 1982 (age 25)		(Hong Kong) South China
35	DF	(Hong Kong) Lee Wai Lun	7 March 1981 (age 26)		(Hong Kong) Sun Hei
2	MF	(China) Mao Jianqing	8 August 1986 (age 20)		(China) Shanghai Shenhua
5	MF	(China) Shao Jiayi	10 April 1980 (age 27)		(Germany) Energie Cottbus
10	MF	(China) Zhao Xuri	3 December 1985 (age 21)		(China) Dalian Shide
11	MF	(China) Zhou Haibin	19 July 1985 (age 21)		(China) Shandong Luneng
14	MF	(China) Zheng Bin	4 July 1977 (age 29)		(China) Wuhan Guanggu
16	MF	(China) Wang Dong	10 September 1981 (age 25)		(China) Changchun Yatai
17	MF	(China) Zheng Zhi	20 August 1980 (age 26)		(England) Charlton Athletic
25	MF	(China) Li Tie	18 September 1977 (age 29)		(England) Sheffield United
34	MF	(Hong Kong) Lo Kwan Yee	9 September 1984 (age 22)		(Hong Kong) Kitchee
	MF	(China) Li Yan	20 June 1980 (age 27)		(China) Shaanxi Baorong Chanba
	MF	(China) Du Zhenyu	1 February 1983 (age 24)		(China) Changchun Yatai
	MF	(China) Tao Wei	11 March 1978 (age 29)		(China) Beijing Guoan
4	FW	(China) Dong Fangzhuo	23 January 1985 (age 22)		(Belgium) Royal Antwerp
6	FW	(China) Wang Peng	16 June 1978 (age 29)		(China) Dalian Shide
7	FW	(China) Han Peng	13 September 1983 (age 23)		(China) Shandong Luneng
15	FW	(China) Qu Bo	15 July 1981 (age 25)		(China) Qingdao Jonoon
24	FW	(China) Zhu Ting	15 July 1985 (age 21)		(China) Dalian Shide
36	FW	(Hong Kong) Chan Siu Ki	14 July 1985 (age 21)		(Hong Kong) Kitchee

FIFA World Stars Team

- Team coach: (France) Gérard Houllier

No.	Pos.	Player	Date of birth (age)	Caps	Club
1	GK	(Switzerland) Pascal Zuberbuehler	8 January 1971 (age 36)		(Switzerland) Neuchâtel Xamax
18	GK	(Liberia) Louis Crayton	26 October 1977 (age 29)		(Switzerland) FC Basel
4	DF	(Benin) Alain Gaspoz	16 May 1970 (age 37)		(Switzerland) FC Sion
5	DF	(Senegal) Kader Mangane	23 March 1983 (age 24)		(Switzerland) Neuchâtel Xamax
12	DF	(Cameroon) Armand Deumi	12 March 1979 (age 28)		(Switzerland) FC Thun
13	DF	(Brazil) Athirson	16 January 1977 (age 30)		(Brazil) Botafogo
14	MF	(Japan) Hidetoshi Nakata	22 January 1977 (age 30)		Retired
16	MF	(South Korea) Kim Joo-Sung	17 January 1966 (age 41)		Retired
17	MF	(Bulgaria) Daniel Borimirov	15 January 1970 (age 37)		(Bulgaria) Levski Sofia
22	MF	(France) Christian Karembeu	3 December 1970 (age 36)		Retired
2	FW	(Zambia) Christopher Katongo	31 August 1982 (age 24)		(Denmark) Brøndby IF
7	FW	(New Zealand) Wynton Rufer	29 December 1962 (age 44)		Retired
8	FW	(Lithuania) Valdas Ivanauskas	31 July 1966 (age 40)		Retired
10	FW	(Iran) Ali Daei	21 March 1969 (age 38)		Retired
11	FW	(Switzerland) Stéphane Chapuisat	28 June 1969 (age 38)		Retired
15	FW	(Georgia (country)) Mikhail Kavelashvili	22 July 1971 (age 35)		Retired
20	FW	(United States) Brian McBride	19 June 1972 (age 35)		(England) Fulham
21	FW	(Jamaica) Luton Shelton	11 November 1985 (age 21)		(England) Sheffield United
