= Jerome McCarthy =

South African footballer

Personal information
- Date of birth: 6 April 1973 (age 53)
- Position: Midfielder

Senior career*
Years	Team	Apps	(Gls)
1998–2001	Santos		
2001–2003	Manning Rangers		

International career
1999	South Africa	2	(0)
- * Club domestic league appearances and goals

Jerome McCarthy (born 6 April 1973) is a South African former soccer player who played at both professional and international levels as a midfielder.

== Career ==
McCarthy played club football for Santos and Manning Rangers. In January 2003 he pleaded guilty to doping offences, and received a fine and community service as punishment.

He also played international football for South Africa.

== Personal life ==
He is the brother of Benni McCarthy. He was arrested with R8.7 million (over $600k) worth of Mandrax in November 2020. He was granted R100 000 bail.
