= Kevin Kyle =

Scottish footballer (born 1981)

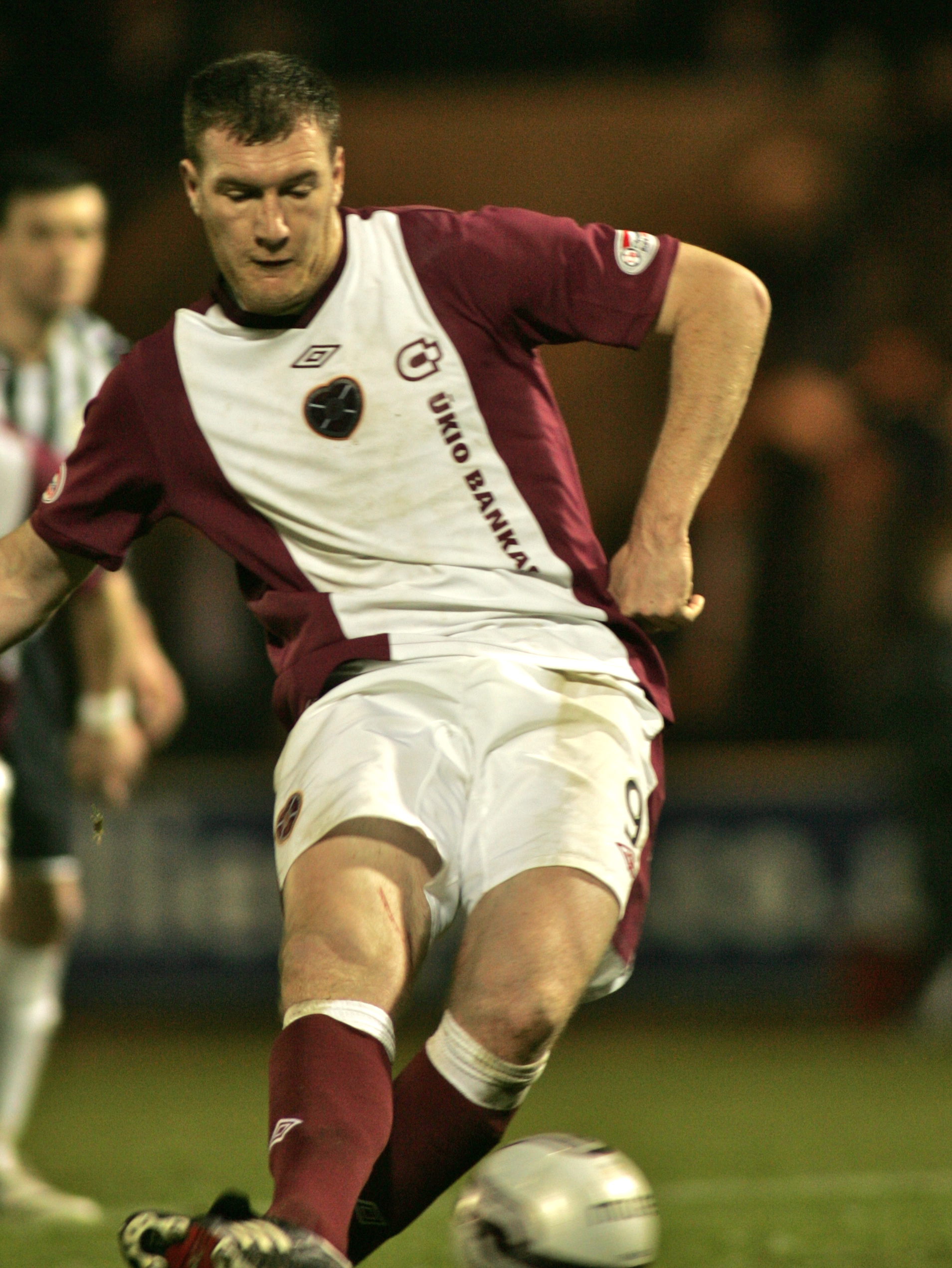
- Kyle playing for Hearts in 2010

Personal information
- Full name: Kevin Alastair Kyle
- Date of birth: 7 June 1981 (age 45)
- Place of birth: Stranraer, Scotland
- Position: Striker

Youth career
- –1998: Ayr United
- 1998–2000: Sunderland

Senior career*
Years	Team	Apps	(Gls)
2000–2006	Sunderland	91	(17)
2000	→ Huddersfield Town (loan)	4	(1)
2000–2001	→ Darlington (loan)	5	(1)
2001	→ Rochdale (loan)	6	(0)
2006–2009	Coventry City	44	(5)
2008	→ Wolverhampton Wanderers (loan)	12	(1)
2008	→ Hartlepool United (loan)	15	(5)
2009–2010	Kilmarnock	43	(16)
2010–2012	Heart of Midlothian	19	(7)
2012–2013	Rangers	8	(3)
2013–2014	Ayr United	24	(5)
2014	Newton Stewart	1	(3)
Total		275	(66)

International career
2000–2003	Scotland under−21	14	(6)
2002–2010	Scotland	10	(1)
- * Club domestic league appearances and goals as of 19:48, 25 March 2016 (UTC)

Kevin Alastair Kyle (born 7 June 1981) is a Scottish former footballer and media personality who played as a centre forward. He played for eleven senior clubs in his career. Kyle gained ten full Scotland international caps and scored one goal.

After starting as a youngster at Ayr United, Kyle began his professional career with Sunderland, where he had been in the youth team. Kyle remained at the Stadium of Light for six years, making 91 appearances in the Football League, scoring 17 goals. He also made his debut for both the Scotland under−21s and its senior team during his time in the North East, as well as gaining promotion to the Premier League in 2004–05. In 2006, he moved to Coventry City, for whom he made 44 league appearances and scored five goals.

In 2009, Kyle signed for Kilmarnock, marking his professional debut in his homeland. After a year in East Ayrshire, during which he scored 16 goals, Kyle signed for Hearts in 2010. In two years at Tynecastle, Kyle scored seven goals in his 19 league appearances. In 2012, Kyle joined Rangers, where he made eight league appearances and scored three goals, and won the Third Division title as the club began its climb back to top tier. Kyle finished his career back at Ayr United in 2013, aged 32, and retired the following year.

== Early life ==
Born and raised in Stranraer, Scotland, Kyle began playing football when he was two years old. Kyle then played for his school team and local amateur sides he was selected to play for Dumfries and Galloway region. Also in the same Dumfries and Galloway team was fellow Stranraer boy Allan Jenkins.

His father was a referee in Scotland and he has an older brother, Mark.

== Club career ==
=== Sunderland ===
Kyle began his career as a youth at Ayr United while working as a baggage handler for Stranraer harbour. One day, he received an invitation for a trial at Sunderland. The trial was successful and Kyle joined the Black Cats in 1998. He spent two seasons as a prolific scorer for their reserves before being called up to the first team in Sunderland's pre–season tour in the 2000–01 season. Upon returning from a loan spell at Huddersfield Town, Kyle signed a four–year contract with the club.

Following his return from his loan spells at Huddersfield Town, Darlington and Rochdale throughout the 2000–01 season, Kyle was expected to be used in the first team. However, he was unable to force his way into a first team that boasted the striking talent of Kevin Phillips and Niall Quinn. On 28 April 2001, Kyle made his debut for Sunderland, coming on as a 74th-minute substitute, in a 1–0 win against Southampton. He made two more appearances for the club later in the 2000–01 season, both as a substitute.

At the start of the 2001–02 season, Kyle continued to play for Sunderland's reserve team and scoring goals in the pre-season. He ended up staying at the club throughout the summer transfer window after being linked with a loan move, as Peter Reid wanted him to stay "for an emergency first team call up". On 12 September 2001, he made his first appearance of the season, coming on as a 75th-minute substitute, in a 4–2 loss against Sheffield Wednesday in second round of the League Cup. Kyle continued to fight for his place in the first team but it was difficult for him to come by, with his playing time, coming from the substitute bench. On 22 December 2001, he made his first league appearance of the season, coming on as a 79th-minute substitute, in a 1–0 win against Everton. At the end of the 2001–02 season, Kyle made eight appearances in all competitions.

Ahead of the 2002–03 season, Kyle was linked with a move to Scottish Premier League side Rangers, with manager Alex McLeish keen on signing him, but manager Reid rejected the bid and he ended up staying at Sunderland. Kyle made his first appearance of the 2002–03 season, starting a match and played 63 minutes before being substituted, in a 1–0 loss against Everton on 24 August 2002. He continued to fight for his place in the first team but it was difficult for him to come by, with his playing time, coming from the substitute bench. On 6 November 2002, Kyle scored his first goal for the club, in a 3–2 loss against Arsenal in the third round of the League Cup. After the match, manager Howard Wilkinson praised his performance, saying: "When I arrived Kevin was very pessimistic about his prospects here. But he did very well against a decent Arsenal defence and showed what a handful he is. He is definitely in my plans and I have told him that." However, Kyle spent the early 2003 with the international commitment at Scotland under-21. On 13 February 2003, he then signed a three–year contract with Sunderland, keeping him until 2026. Following his return, Kyle received a handful of first team football towards the end of the season, as the club was relegated to the Football League First Division, finishing at the bottom of the Premier League. During his run-ins in the first team, he was known "for terrorising one of the best defences, causing them all sorts of problems", due to his "physical approach". At the end of the 2002–03 season, Kyle made twenty–two appearances and scoring once in all competitions.

The 2003–04 season was Kyle's breakthrough into the Sunderland first team and was given a number nine shirt. He almost missed the start of the season after suffering a knee injury during a friendly match against York City on 16 July 2003. But Kyle was given all clear and returned to the first team. In the opening game of the season against Nottingham Forest, his performance came under criticism for missing a number of targets that saw the club loss 2–0, prompting Kyle to apologise after the match. In a follow–up match against Mansfield Town in the first round of the League Cup, he scored an own-goal to give the opposition team to score an equaliser, but he scored the winning goal, in a 2–1 win. Kyle then established himself in the first team, forming a striking partnership with Marcus Stewart. He scored on 13 September 2003 and 16 September 2003 against Crystal Palace and Stoke City respectively. On 23 September 2003, Kyle scored twice, in a 4–2 loss against Huddersfield Town in the second round of the League Cup. He, once again, on 30 September 2003 and 4 October 2003 against Ipswich Town and Sheffield Wednesday respectively. However, Kyle went on a seven match streak without scoring. After missing one match due to a hip injury while on international duty with Scotland under-21, he scored on his return from injury, in a 1–1 draw against Burnley on 29 November 2003. In a match against Wimbledon on 20 December 2003, Kyle received a red card for a second bookable offence in the last minute of the game, in a 2–1 win. In a follow–up match against Bradford City, he scored the third goal of the game, in a 3–0 win. On 13 February 2004, Kyle scored his tenth goal of the season, in a 1–1 draw against Birmingham City in the fifth round of the FA Cup. In a match against Walsall on 3 March 2004, he played with a dead leg but scored Sunderland's second goal of the game and set up a goal for Stewart, in a 3–1 win. On 13 March 2004, Kyle scored his twelfth goal of the season, in a 2–0 win against West Ham United. After missing one match due to an illness, he made his return to the starting line–up, in a 2–1 win against Wimbledon on 6 April 2004. In a follow–up match against Sheffield United, Kyle scored his thirteenth goal of the season, in a 2–1 win. On the last game of the season, he scored the winning goal for the club, in a 2–1 win against Burnley. Having reached his target of trying to help Sunderland reach the play-offs, Kyle scored in both legs against Crystal Palace, as the club, however, lost 5–4 on penalties following a 4–4 on aggregate. At the end of the 2003–04 season, he made fifty–three appearances and scoring sixteen goals in all competitions, becoming their joint top goalscorer alongside Stewart with 16 goals.

At the start of the 2004–05 season, Kyle appeared in the first seven matches in the first month to the season. He scored his first goal of the season, in a 3–0 win against Chester City in the first round of the League Cup. However, during the pre–season, Kyle suffered a hip injury, but he recovered in time for the first game of the 2004–05 season. Following the operation on his injury, Kyle was eventually out for the rest of the 2004–05 season. He described the recovery as the most frustrating time of his professional football career. While recovering, Kyle revealed that he was in talks with Sunderland over a new contract. But on 6 April 2005, Kyle returned to the club's reserve team in a match against Aston Villa's reserve team, where he scored five goals. During his absent, Sunderland were promoted to the Premier League after a three–year absence. Despite this, Kyle finished the 2004–05 season, making seven appearances and scoring once in all competitions.

Despite optimism of making a return to the first team at the 2005–06 season, Kyle, however, continued to recover from his hip injury throughout the first half of the season. Following an operation on his hip, his recovery was aided by visits to Bayern Munich doctor Hans-Wilhelm Müller-Wohlfahrt and American hip surgeon Marc Phillipon. There were suggestions that Kyle may retire from professional football. On 10 January 2006, he made his return from injury for Sunderland's reserve team, where he played 45 minutes against Middlesbrough's reserve team. On 28 January 2006, Kyle made his first appearance for the club in seventeen months, starting a match and played 61 minutes before being substituted, in a 2–1 loss against Brentford in the fourth round of the FA Cup. After the match, he said about his return: "The hip is alright. There was no problem on that score - the only problem was trying to get a performance out of it. It didn't exactly go according to plan, but what do you expect? After 17 months out I can hardly expect to click straight back into the kind of form I would like. It's going to take games, it's going to take training and it's going to take time. I'll get there, but this wasn't a great day for either myself or for anyone in the team. I let myself down and the team let everybody down as well." Three days later, on 31 January 2006, Kyle made his first Premier League appearance in three years for Sunderland, coming on as a 32nd-minute substitute, in a 3–0 loss against Middlesbrough. After previously stating his determination to score goals, he scored his first and only Premier League goal, in an away defeat to Manchester City on 6 March 2006. Since returning to first team action from injury, Kyle became involved in the first team, alternating between the starting eleven and substitute bench. However, Kyle suffered an injury when he scalded himself with boiling water in an accident at home and missed two matches as a result. On 17 April 2006, Kyle made his return from injury, coming on as a 68th-minute substitute, in a 4–1 loss against rivals, Newcastle United. In a follow–up match against Portsmouth on 22 April 2006, he was at fault by hand-balling that resulted in a penalty and successfully converted, as the club loss 2–1. Sunderland was eventually relegated on a then-record low points tally. At the end of the 2005–06 season, Kyle made fourteen appearances and scoring once in all competitions.

With his contract expiring at the end of the 2005–06 season, Sunderland opted to take up their option of a contract extension that would ensure Kyle remained under contract for the 2006–07 season. Amid to his future at the club, he was offered a new contract by Sunderland. By the time Kyle left the club, he made two appearances for the side, both league matches despite suffering a foot injury that kept him out for two matches.

During his time at Sunderland, Kyle was highly regarded by the club's supporters.

==== Loan spells from Sunderland ====
On 9 September 2000, Kyle gained first team experience on loan when he joined Huddersfield Town for a month. Kyle made his debut for the club, coming on as a 61st-minute substitute, in a 3–2 win against Bolton Wanderers on the same day. After making four appearances for Huddersfield Town, he returned to his parent club. Reflecting on his first loan spell, Kyle said: "I didn't make a start at the McAlpine Stadium but I did get my first taste of senior football and I am sure I will learn something from playing some third division matches."

On 1 November 2000, Kyle joined Darlington on a month's loan. He made his debut for the club, starting the whole game, in a 2–0 loss against Hull City on 4 November 2000. Having received permission to play in a FA Cup match, Kyle scored his first professional goal in his career, in a 6–1 win against A.F.C. Sudbury on 18 November 2000. Two weeks later on 2 December 2000, he scored his first league goal in his first career, in a 2–1 win against Mansfield Town. After extending his second loan spell with Darlington, Kyle, however, suffered an injury and was taken–off at half-time, in a 2–2 draw against Luton Town on 19 December 2000, in what turns out to be his last appearance for the club. After returning to his parent club, he made eight appearances and scoring two times in all competitions.

In January 2001, Kyle joined Rochdale on a month's loan. He made his debut for the club, coming on as a 77th-minute substitute, in a 3–1 win against Leyton Orient on 28 January 2001. Kyle made six appearances for Rochdale before returning to his parent club.

=== Coventry City ===
Kyle then joined Coventry City on 25 August 2006 for £600,000. It came after when Micky Adams was keen on signing him, which he initially denied the claim.

The next day, he made his debut for Coventry City, starting the whole game, in a 1–0 win against Hull City. In a follow–up match against Norwich City, Kyle scored his first goal for the club, in a 3–0 win. Initially, he received several starts for Coventry City, forming a striking partnership with Dele Adebola. However, his lack of goalscoring form led to him place on the substitute bench. Kyle also found himself out of the first team, due to his own injury concerns and suspension. On 13 January 2007, he scored his second goal for Coventry City, in a 4–2 loss against Crystal Palace. A month later on 23 February 2007, Kyle scored his third goal for the club, in a 2–1 win against Southampton. Following a 4–0 loss against Preston North End on 14 April 2007, his performance came under criticism by the club's supporters, who booed him throughout the match. This prompted defence from teammate, Colin Cameron, who said the booing from the supporters was a "disgrace". At the end of the 2006–07 season, he made thirty–three appearances and scoring three times in all competitions.

In the opening game of the 2007–08 season, Kyle scored his first goal of the season, in a 4–1 win against Barnsley. However, he suffered a hip injury that kept him out for a month. On 6 October 2007, Kyle made his return from injury, coming on as a 75th-minute substitute, in a 1–0 loss against Wolverhampton Wanderers. Following his return from injury, he found his playing time, coming from the substitute bench for Coventry City. On 6 November 2007, Kyle came on as a 75th-minute substitute and scored the winning goal, in a 2–1 win against Queens Park Rangers. However, he suffered ankle injury during a match against Norwich City on 24 November 2007 and was substituted in the 53rd minute, as the club loss 2–0. After the match, Kyle was out for several weeks. On 22 December 2007, Kyle made his return from injury and started a match against Blackpool, only for him to be sent–off in the 31st minute for elbowing Shaun Barker, as Coventry City loss 4–0. After the match, he served a three match suspension. On 12 January 2008, Kyle made his return from suspension, coming on as a 71st-minute substitute, in a 2–0 loss against Leicester City. In a follow–up match against Burnley, he received a red card for a second-bookable, in a 2–1 loss. By the time Kyle left the club, he made fourteen appearances and scoring two times in all competitions.

Following his return from a loan spell at Coventry City, Kyle was deemed surplus of requirements by manager Chris Coleman ahead of the 2008–09 season. He was linked with a move to Plymouth Argyle, Burnley, Crystal Palace and Southend United. However, Kyle's move to Plymouth Argyle collapsed due to his wage demands. After failing to feature at all during the opening stages of the next season for his parent club, it was emerged that the club refused to play him that requires to pay an appearance-related transfer fee to Sunderland. Following his return from a loan spell at Hartlepool United, Coventry City announced on 27 January 2009 that they had reached an agreement with Kyle over the remaining six months of his contract, and he had left the club by mutual consent.

During his time at Coventry City, Kyle fell out of favour with the Sky Blues and despised by their fans. He later described their fans as the worst "he ever come across" despite his initial determination to prove them wrong. Kyle said his two–year spell at Coventry City was horrible.

==== Loan spells from Coventry City ====
On 30 January 2008, Kyle traded a relegation battle with Coventry for a promotion push with a loan to fellow Championship side Wolverhampton Wanderers during the latter half of the 2007–08 season, reuniting him with his former Sunderland boss Mick McCarthy. After serving a two-match suspension while at Coventry City, he made his debut for the club, coming on as a 63rd-minute substitute, in a 3–0 loss against Watford on 2 February 2008. On 23 February 2008, Kyle scored his first goal for Wolverhampton Wanderers, in a 2–0 win against Crystal Palace. After the match, Kyle said he dedicated his goal to manager, Mick McCarthy. Since joining the club, Kyle found himself competing with the club's strikers and his playing time coming from the substitute bench. However, he missed the three remaining matches of the season, including being ineligible against his parent club, Coventry City. At the end of the 2007–08 season, Kyle made 13 appearances, nine as substitute and scoring once in all competitions. While Wolves finished seventh, outside the play-offs, his move was not made permanent as Kyle said he would rather return to Coventry, who finished a point clear of the relegation positions in 21st, in the summer.

On 1 October 2008, Kyle joined Hartlepool United on a month's loan. The club were interested in him throughout September, but the wages was a stumbling block as the reason not joining them earlier. He made his debut for the club two days later, in a 3–3 draw against Swindon Town. After making his Hartlepool United debut, Kyle said he wanted to stay at the club until the end of the year. Since joining Hartlepool United, Kyle quickly became a first team regular, playing in the forward position. On 21 October 2008, he scored his first goal for the club, scoring twice, in a 5–3 win against Huddersfield Town. In a follow–up match, Kyle scored the only goal of the game, in a win against Brighton & Hove Albion. Following this, there were uncertainties on whether or not Hartlepool United would successfully extend Kyle's loan. After some time of negotiating, his loan was later extended until the end of the year. Following this, he continued to start a number of matches for the club. It was announced on 13 December 2008 that Kyle would be returning to Coventry City after it was revealed that Hartlepool United could not afford him permanently. On 19 December 2008, he scored a brace, in a 3–0 win against Southend United. By the time Kyle returned to his parent club, he made scored five goals in 15 starts.

=== Kilmarnock ===
On 29 January 2009, Kyle signed for Kilmarnock on an 18-month contract, marking the first time for him to play for a Scottish club professionally. He was previously linked with a move to Major League Soccer side San Jose Earthquakes, but the move never materialised. Upon joining the club, he said the move would help him earn a call-up from Scotland, a sentiment was agreed by manager Jim Jefferies.

On 31 January 2009, Kyle scored a headed goal on his debut for Kilmarnock against St Mirren and this goal was also the first at the new St Mirren Park. After the match, his performance was praised by teammate, David Fernández and manager Jim Jefferies. In a follow–up match against Inverness Caledonian Thistle in the fifth round of the Scottish Cup, he received a straight red card in the 68th-minute for elbowing David Proctor, in a 2–0 loss. After serving a one match suspension, Kyle returned to the starting line–up, in a 3–1 loss against Rangers on 21 February 2009. Since joining the club, he became a first team regular, playing in the forward position and formed a partnership with David Fernández. His form led to newspaper The Herald write a piece about Kyle's rehabilitation. On 11 April 2009, Kyle scored all three goals, his first ever professional hat-trick, in a 3–0 victory against Falkirk, for which he received a standing ovation when he was substituted. Kyle was praised for his part in keeping Killie in the Scottish Premier League that season. After serving a two match suspensions, he scored all of Kilmarnock's goals in the remaining matches of the 2008–2009 season Scottish Premier League's split, drawing with Falkirk and victories against St Mirren and Inverness Caledonian Thistle thus helping the team secure 8th place and SPL survival. Despite missing the last game of the 2008–09 season, Kyle made twelve appearances and scoring eight goals in total that season.

Ahead of the 2009–10 season, Kyle was given confidence by Kilmarnock he can help the club "fire up the Scottish Premier League", with manager Jefferies describing him as their "weapon of mass destruction". Kyle was made Kilmarnock club captain for the 2009–10 season. He started where he left off by scoring twice in the opening day 3–0 home victory over Hamilton Academical and his good form won him a recall to the Scotland squad after an absence of five years. In the second round of the Scottish League Cup game against Greenock Morton (in which Kyle also scored), he suffered a knee injury, sidelining him for three weeks and causing him to miss the final two FIFA World Cup qualifiers matches. On 15 September 2009, Kyle made his return from injury, coming on as a 56th-minute substitute, in a 1–0 loss against Hearts. In a follow–up match against St Mirren in the last 16 of the Scottish League Cup, he scored his third goal of the season, in a 2–1 loss. After suffering an injury while on training and missed a one match, Kyle made his return to the starting line–up, in a 1–0 loss against Hibernian on 17 October 2009. In a follow–up match against St Johnstone, he scored twice, in a 2–1 win. Following his return from injury, Kyle continued to remain in the first team, forming Kilmarnock's partnership with Conor Sammon. On 5 December 2009, he scored the only goal of the game, in a 1–0 win against St Johnstone. In January 2010, he relinquished the club captaincy following his involvement in the events that ultimately led to the departure of manager Jim Jefferies. Despite this, Kyle scored his eighth goal of the season, in a 4–4 draw against Dundee United on 30 January 2010. On 13 February 2010, he scored his ninth goal of the season, in a 3–2 win against St Johnstone, scoring against them for the third time in the 2009–10 season. Kyle became unhappy at Kilmarnock and went on trial with Russian side PFC Spartak Nalchik with a view to join them at the end of the season when his current deal expired but he rejected a move. Whilst playing in a trial match there, Kyle picked up an injury, angering manager Jimmy Calderwood, as he missed key games for the club. Kyle would reject a move to Russia, citing his love of Scotland. Despite this, he made his return to the starting line–up, in a 2–1 loss against Hamilton Academical on 24 March 2010. After missing two matches through suspension, Kyle made his return to the starting line–up, in a 1–0 loss against St Mirren on 24 April 2010. On 5 May 2010, he scored his tenth goal of the season, in a 2–1 win against Aberdeen. At the end of the 2009–10 season, Kyle made thirty–six appearances and scoring ten times in all competitions. On 10 June 2010, Kyle announced his decision to leave Kilmarnock, with the club's chairman Michael Johnston as the reason.

=== Heart of Midlothian ===
Kyle signed a two-year contract with Heart of Midlothian on 3 June 2010, which reunited him with Jim Jefferies. He was linked with a move to both the Jam Tarts and Aberdeen. Aberdeen withdrew the offer to sign Kyle due to their refusal to meet his wage demands.

He made his debut for the club, coming on as a 66th-minute substitute, in a 1–1 draw against St Johnstone on 14 August 2010. His first goal for Hearts came the following week against Hamilton Academical, scoring from a penalty spot, in a 4–0 win. Three days later on 24 August 2010, Kyle scored his second goal for the club, in a 4–0 win against Elgin City in the second round of the Scottish League Cup. A month later on 21 September 2010, he scored twice against Falkirk in the third round of the Scottish League Cup, as the club lost 4-3 and was out of the tournament. Since joining Hearts, Kyle became a first team regular, forming a striking partnership with Stephen Elliott, Gary Glen and Calum Elliot. He took over taking penalty kicks at the club and scored six goals out of six from the spot, plus another four from open play, in the 2010–11 season. Kyle scored a late winner in the Edinburgh derby against Hibernian on 1 January 2011. The remainder of his 2010–11 season was blighted by a hip injury, as he made his last appearance of the season on 11 January 2011. At the end of the 2010–11 season, Kyle made twenty–two appearances and scoring ten times in all competitions.

The injury continued to trouble Kyle in the 2011–12 season despite his optimism that he could return. After several setbacks Kyle admitted that he feared this could be the end of his footballing career. Kyle underwent a further operation on his hip in January 2012, but he was released from his contract on 11 March 2012. Following his release by Hearts, Kyle said he determined to prolong his football career despite being injured.

=== Rangers ===
Kyle was initially invited back to train with Hearts during the 2012–13 pre-season however this fell through following the departure of manager Paulo Sérgio. He began training with Dunfermline Athletic and featured for them as a trialist during their pre-season friendlies. Kyle then joined St Johnstone on trial. After revealing he would be open to a move to Third Division side Rangers, Kyle accepted an invite to take part in one of their training sessions. On 7 August 2012, he signed a one-year contract with Rangers.

Kyle made his debut for the club on the same day as signing as a substitute at home to East Fife in the League Cup first round. In the quarter–finals of the Scottish League Cup match against Queen of the South, he was sent–off for a second bookable offence, as Rangers loss 4–3 on penalties following a 2–2 draw. After serving a two-match suspension, Kyle returned to the first team, coming on as a 71st-minute substitute, in a 1–0 loss against Stirling Albion on 6 October 2012. Since joining Rangers, he found his playing time, coming from the substitute bench, as well as, facing his own both fitness and injury concern. Kyle scored on 17 November 2012 and 2 December 2012 against East Stirlingshire and Elgin City respectively. On 15 December 2012, he scored his third goal for the club, in a 4–2 win against Montrose, in what turns out to be his last appearance for the side. Following this, Kyle found himself out of the first team due to surplus of requirements and his own injury concerns until his departure from Rangers. Reflecting on his time at the club, newspaper The Herald said: "Bagged a couple of goals when fit before injury prematurely ended his spell at Rangers." Despite this, his contributions saw the club promoted to Scottish League One.

On 16 March 2013, Kyle left the club by mutual consent. After leaving Rangers, he spoke about his time at the club, regarding his wages there and the new ownership.

=== Ayr United ===
In late–August 2013, Kyle started training with Ayr United and soon began playing in reserve games. He made his debut, although as a trialist, after being subbed on in a 1–1 draw at Stenhousemuir on 14 September 2013. Kyle played one more game before finally signing a contract, which was held up due to financial constraints, that lasted until January 2014.

On 19 October 2013, he scored his first goal for the club, in a 2–0 win against Arbroath. Since joining Ayr United, Kyle became a first team regular, playing in the forward position. A month later on 23 November 2013, Kyle scored the winning goal for Ayr United, in a 4–3 win against Stenhousemuir. On 21 December 2013, he scored another winning goal for the club, in a 1–0 win against Forfar Athletic. On 11 January 2014, Kyle scored his fourth goal for Ayr United and set up the second goal of the game, in a 3–0 win against Airdrieonians. On 28 January 2014, he signed a contract extension with the club, keeping him until the end of the 2013–14 season. After missing one match due to suspension, Kyle scored his fifth goal of the season, in a 5–0 win against East Fife on 15 March 2014. Despite returning to the first team after missing one match, he was unable to help Ayr United reach promotion, having lost both legs in the Scottish Championship play-offs against Cowdenbeath. At the end of the 2013–14 season, Kyle made thirty–one appearances and scoring five goals in all competitions. Following this, he was released by the club.

Following his departure from Ayr United, Kyle would join South of Scotland League side Newton Stewart in August 2014, although only making once appearance for the club, in which he would score a hat-trick. Kyle would retire from football shortly thereafter.

== International career ==
Throughout 2000, Kyle was first called up to the Scotland under−21 squad but he did play two times. In late–2002, Kyle returned to play for the Scotland under-21 squad, including scoring against Iceland under-21. On 1 April 2003, he scored his second goal for Scotland under-21, in a 2–1 loss against Lithuania under-21. A week after playing for the senior team against New Zealand, Kyle was demoted to play for the under-21 side. On 7 June 2003, he started the whole game, in a 2–2 draw against Germany under-21. Kyle went on to make fourteen appearances and scoring six goals for Scotland under-21.

In April 2002, Kyle was called up to the Scotland B for the first time by manager Berti Vogts. On 1 May 2002, he made his debut for Scotland B, starting a match and played 45 minutes before being substituted at half–time, in a 2–0 win against Dundee United. On 17 December 2002, Kyle scored his first goal for the Scotland B team, in a 3–3 draw against Germany B team. On 20 May 2003, he scored his second goal for Scotland B team, in a 2–1 win against Northern Ireland B team.

On 9 May 2002, Kyle was called up to the Scotland for the first time for the match against a Hong Kong League XI during the HKSAR Reunification Cup. He made his national team debut, coming on as a 66th-minute substitute, in a 4–1 loss against South Korea on 16 May 2002. On 23 May 2002, Kyle scored his first goal for Scotland, in a 1–0 win against a Hong Kong League XI during the HKSAR Reunification Cup. Despite scoring his first goal for the national team, manager Vogts, however, criticised Kyle after he was involved in altercation with Carlo Hartwig. For the rest of 2002, Kyle began competing with Steven Thompson and other strikers for the first choice role as a striker.

Between 2003 and 2004, Kyle made two appearances for the Scotland national team, playing against New Zealand and Denmark. His lack of first team opportunities during his club career caused him to lose his place in the national team. He acknowledged this, saying: "the only way I can force my way into the Scotland squad is by doing the business for Sunderland, starting in this game. This would be the ideal time to bounce back."

In August 2009, he was called up to the Scotland squad by manager George Burley for the final two FIFA World Cup qualifiers against Macedonia and the Netherlands. Explaining his reasons for calling him, he said: "Kevin might be a player you can use as a sub, changing things in the last 10 or 15 minutes. You are looking to give your squad a different dimension and that's why he is in. Kevin gives us that physical presence. He is strong, aggressive and can score goals. We don't have that type of player in the squad." It was his first call–up in five years for the national team. But Kyle did not play due to an injury. After recovering from his injury, he received a call–up from the national team on 5 November 2009. On 14 November 2009, Kyle played his first match for Scotland in five years, coming on as a 62nd-minute substitute, in a 3–0 loss against Wales, in what turns out to be his last appearance for the national side. His last call up was for a friendly against the Faroe Islands in November 2010, but he did not play. Following this, Kyle played his full international level, making ten appearances and scoring once.

== Post–playing football career ==
Following his retirement from professional football, Kyle worked in the Shetland Islands for two years, doing 18-day stints of 12-hour shifts as a room-keeper on the MS Regina Baltica cruiseferry. "Life was pretty shit," he said. At a Clyde F.C. training camp, he met Simon Ferry, who asked him if he'd like to come on his Keeping the Ball on the Ground podcast.

Kevin entered the BDO Scottish Open darts tournament in 2016, reaching the last 256. He beat Lakeside semi-finalist Richard Veenstra, who was ninth seed in the tournament, on the way. He was previously worked as a pundit for the BDO Scottish Open darts tournament.

=== Media career ===
In 2018, Kyle was interviewed by Simon Ferry on the YouTube channel Open Goal. "I did the interview and I thought, 'This could be quite good.' I don't know how to filter things and just say things how it is." After returning to the channel for a few appearances, Kyle became a permanent fixture on the channel, regularly featuring on the channel's podcast with Ferry and Paul Slane, as well as Andy Halliday later on. The show has gained a large cult following, and Open Goal was awarded 'Best Podcast' at the 2019 Football Blogging Awards.

== Personal life ==
Growing up, Kyle said he considered Duncan Ferguson and Niall Quinn to be his footballing hero. He described himself as the player who doesn't like to be angered. During his playing career, Kyle acknowledged his issues with problem gambling, having been addicted to it when he was thirteen. In October 2009, Kyle was examined on his fitness levels with the help of sports scientists at University of Glasgow.

While being out with a hip injury during his time at Sunderland, Kyle studied a three-year accountancy course. He also revealed that he did maths Highers (equivalent to A-level in Scotland), due to his good knowledge with the number, but did not went further, saying: "after a year and a few tests I thought I'd best take time out."

Kyle is married to Lynn. He has four sons; Max, Harry, Danny and Tom. The family lives in Stanraer. His brother-in-law is fellow Stanraer native Jamie Adams.

In October 2003, Kyle was arrested for a breach of the peace after a brawl in Stranraer. Four months later, he was found guilty and was fined £500 in Stranraer Sheriff Court. In March 2007, Kyle was convicted of two breaches of the peace after a brawl in Stranraer. As part of his conviction, he had to do "120 hours of community service", which "combined football coaching for kids with disabilities with some gardening work at a home for the disabled". Kyle was also banned from driving for six months after he "admitted to driving on the wrong side of the road". Local newspaper Coventry Telegraph described him as "the undisputed champion of the alcohol-related incident."

== Career statistics ==
=== Club ===
As of 15 March 2014

Club	Season	League		FA Cup		League Cup		Europe		Other		Total	
Club	Season	App	Goals	App	Goals	App	Goals	App	Goals	App	Goals	App	Goals
Sunderland	2000–01	3	0	0	0	0	0	0	0	0	0	3	0
Sunderland	2001–02	6	0	1	0	1	0	0	0	0	0	8	0
Sunderland	2002–03	17	0	3	0	2	1	0	0	0	0	22	1
Sunderland	2003–04	46	12	5	1	2	3	0	0	0	0	53	16
Sunderland	2004–05	6	0	0	0	1	1	0	0	0	0	7	1
Sunderland	2005–06	13	1	1	0	0	0	0	0	0	0	14	1
Sunderland	2006–07	2	0	0	0	0	0	0	0	0	0	2	0
Huddersfield Town	2000–01	4	0	0	0	0	0	0	0	0	0	4	0
Darlington	2000–01	5	1	3	1	0	0	0	0	0	0	8	2
Rochdale	2000–01	6	0	0	0	0	0	0	0	0	0	6	0
Coventry	2006–07	31	3	2	0	0	0	0	0	0	0	33	3
Coventry	2007–08	13	2	0	0	1	0	0	0	0	0	14	2
Wolves	2007–08	12	1	1	0	0	0	0	0	0	0	13	1
Hartlepool	2008–09	15	5	0	0	0	0	0	0	0	0	15	5
Kilmarnock	2008–09	11	8	1	0	0	0	0	0	0	0	12	8
Kilmarnock	2009–10	32	8	2	0	2	2	0	0	0	0	36	10
Heart of Midlothian	2010–11	19	7	1	0	2	3	0	0	0	0	22	10
Heart of Midlothian	2011–12	0	0	0	0	0	0	0	0	0	0	0	0
Rangers	2012–13	8	3	0	0	2	0	0	0	1	0	11	3
Ayr United	2013–14	24	5	3	0	0	0	0	0	0	0	27	5
Newton Stewart	2014–15	1	3	0	0	0	0	0	0	0	0	1	3
Total		274	57	23	3	13	10	0	0	1	0	311	71

=== International ===
Scotland national team
Year	Apps	Goals
2002	7	1
2003	1	0
2004	1	0
2009	1	0
Total	10	1

==== International goals ====
Scores and results list Scotland's goal tally first.

#	Date	Venue	Opponent	Score	Result	Competition
1	23 May 2002	Hong Kong Stadium, Hong Kong	Hong Kong	1–0	4–0	HKSAR Reunification Cup

== Honours ==
Sunderland

- Football League Championship Champions: 2004–05

Rangers

- Scottish Football League Third Division Champions: 2012–13

Individual

- North East Football Award – young player of the year: 2004
- 2014s Navy League Winners (Manager)
