= Odi Stadium =

Stadium in Mabopane

Coordinates: 25°31′18.85″S 28°2′25.62″E

Odi Stadium is a derelict multi-purpose stadium in Mabopane, South Africa. It was used mostly for soccer matches. The stadium holds 60,000, and is the third-biggest stadium in the country. It was the home stadium of Garankuwa United football team. The stadium was built by an Israel-based construction firm.

Odi Stadium is situated in Mabopane, in the north of Pretoria, within the jurisdiction of Tshwane Metropolitan Municipality. It has hosted a number of high-profile games featuring Mamelodi Sundowns.

The stadium consists of an uncovered grandstand, secondary, four rectangular, two small triangular stands and twenty floating stands, giving the stadium a seating capacity of over fifty thousand seats.

The stadium was constructed in the late 1980s and boasts many facilities, including a soccer field, athletics track, field events (long jump, high jump, javelin throw, hammer throw, etc.), two changing rooms, four sets of male and female restrooms, four kiosks, VIP lounge & seating, security room, referee room, press room, control room, admin offices, generator room, stores, several indoor sporting areas, four high masts and four ticketing offices.

Precinct facilities outside the stadium include a club house, caretaker house, combi courts for tennis, basketball, volleyball and two informal soccer training grounds.

The stadium design is almost identical to that of Mmabatho Stadium located in Mahikeng. The stadium has since been neglected and vandalized. Local residents have protested in demand that it be demolished because it has become unsafe for children that still practice and train there despite the unhealthy and unsafe conditions.

Following the Ellis Park Stadium disaster, the stadium's design, with its single entry point, was considered unsafe, and games began to moved away from the stadium.

As of 2021, the stadium is derelict, not having hosted any professional sports for over 15 years.
