= Mmabatho Stadium =

Sports venue in Mafikeng, South Africa

Coordinates: 25°49′53.78″S 25°37′13.62″E

Mmabatho Stadium is a multi-purpose stadium in Mafikeng, South Africa. It is currently used mostly for football matches. The stadium holds 59,000 people and was designed and built in 1981 by an Israeli construction firm.

The design of the stadium is almost identical to that of the Odi Stadium located in Mabopane.
