= Lovers Mohlala =

South African soccer player

Personal information
- Full name: Jethro Mohlala
- Date of birth: 12 February 1976 (age 50)
- Place of birth: Alexandra, Gauteng, South Africa
- Position: Defender

Youth career
- Oliver Stars
- Alexandra Blackpool

Senior career*
Years	Team	Apps	(Gls)
1992–1997	Wits University	93	(7)
1997–2003	Mamelodi Sundowns	141	(6)
2003	Jomo Cosmos	9	(1)
2004	Aris	2	(0)
2004–2005	Jomo Cosmos	0	(7)
2005–2006	Silver Stars	0	(1)
2006–2007	Moroka Swallows	24	(1)
2007–2008	AmaZulu	4	(1)
2008–2009	Black Leopards	0	(0)

International career
1993	South Africa U17	3	(0)
1993–1994	South Africa U20	4	(0)
1995–1996	South Africa U23	7	(0)
1999–2003	South Africa	9	(0)
- * Club domestic league appearances and goals

Jethro Mohlala, commonly known as Lovers Mohlala, (born 26 April 1975) is a South African former soccer player who played professionally as a left-fullback in Greece and South Africa. He earned nine caps for the South African national team, and was named to the squad for the 2002 COSAFA Cup.

== Career ==
Born in Alexandra, Mohlala turned professional with Wits University in 1992. After five seasons with Wits, he joined Mamelodi Sundowns. Following a failed move to F.C. Copenhagen, Mohlala forced a move to AmaZulu. Shortly after, he re-signed with Wits, before moving to Jomo Cosmos.

In January 2004, Mohlala signed with Super League Greece side Aris, but he made just two league appearances for the club before returning to South Africa six months later. He would play for Jomo Cosmos, Silver Stars, Moroka Swallows, AmaZulu and Black Leopards before retiring in 2009.

Mohlala represented South Africa at all age levels. He made his senior debut in a 1999 COSAFA Cup match against Botswana.
