= 2005–06 RC Celta de Vigo season =

RC Celta de Vigo
2005–06 season
- Chairman: Horacio Gómez Araújo
- Manager: Fernando Vázquez
- Stadium: Balaídos
- La Liga: 6th
- Copa del Rey: Round of 16
- Top goalscorer: League: Fernando Baiano (14); All: Fernando Baiano (15)
- Highest home attendance: 34,750 vs Barcelona (3 May 2006)
- Lowest home attendance: 13,000 vs Cádiz (26 February 2006)

The 2005–06 Celta de Vigo season was the club's 82nd season in its history, and its first participating in La Liga, the first tier of Spanish football, since 2003–04, having been promoted from the Segunda División the previous season. Los Celestes enjoyed a successful return to the top flight, finishing the season in 6th place and qualifying for the first round of the 2006–07 UEFA Cup. Celta also participated in the Copa del Rey, reaching the round of 16 before being eliminated on away goals by Real Betis.

== First team squad ==
Note: Flags indicate national team as defined under FIFA eligibility rules; some limited exceptions apply. Players may hold more than one non-FIFA nationality.

No.	Pos.	Nation	Player
1	GK	ESP	Esteban
2	DF	ESP	José Enrique (on loan from Valencia)
3	DF	ARG	Matías Lequi
4	MF	ESP	Borja Oubiña
5	MF	BRA	Everton Giovanella
6	MF	BRA	Roberto Sousa
7	MF	ESP	Antonio Núñez
8	DF	ESP	Ángel
9	FW	ESP	Juan Sánchez
10	FW	ESP	Javi Guerrero
11	MF	ARG	Gustavo López
12	DF	ARG	Diego Placente
13	GK	ESP	José Manuel Pinto
14	FW	ESP	Jesús Perera

No.	Pos.	Nation	Player
15	DF	CHI	Pablo Contreras
16	MF	ESP	David Silva (on loan from Valencia)
17	DF	ARG	Sebastián Méndez
18	FW	BRA	Fernando Baiano
19	DF	ESP	Yago Yao
20	MF	ESP	Jonathan Aspas
21	MF	ESP	Jorge Larena
22	FW	NED	Daniël de Ridder
23	DF	ESP	Sergio Fernández
24	MF	URU	Fabián Canobbio
25	MF	BRA	Iriney
—	GK	ESP	Sergio Álvarez
—	FW	MEX	Carlos Vela (on loan from Arsenal)

== Competitions ==
=== Legend ===
Win Draw Loss

=== Overall ===
Competition	Started round	Final position / round	First match	Last match
La Liga		6th	28 August 2005	13 May 2006
Copa del Rey	Third round	Round of 16	20 October 2005	11 January 2006

=== Competition record ===
Competition	Record							
Competition	G	W	D	L	GF	GA	GD	Win %
La Liga	38	20	4	14	45	33	+12	52.63
Copa del Rey	4	2	2	0	5	2	+3	50.00
Total	42	22	6	14	50	35	+15	52.38

=== La Liga ===
28 August 2005 1	Celta Vigo	2–0	Málaga	Vigo
18:00	López 10'; Baiano 46'	Report		Stadium: Balaídos; Attendance: 26,000; Referee: César Muñiz Fernández

10 September 2005 2	Real Madrid	2–3	Celta Vigo	Madrid
19:00	Ronaldo 36' (pen.); Baptista 43'	Report	Contreras 7'; Núñez 44'; Canobbio 78'	Stadium: Santiago Bernabéu Stadium; Attendance: 80,000; Referee: Rafael Ramírez Domínguez

18 September 2005 3	Celta Vigo	0–1	Racing de Santander	Vigo
16:00		Report	Casquero 60'	Stadium: Balaídos; Attendance: 16,000; Referee: Antonio Rubinos Pérez

21 September 2005 4	Villarreal	1–2	Celta Vigo	Villarreal
20:00	Riquelme 81'	Report	Baiano 26', 46'	Stadium: El Madrigal; Attendance: 17,000; Referee: Javier Turienzo Alvarez

25 September 2005 5	Celta Vigo	2–1	Sevilla	Vigo
20:00	Baiano 1'; Oubiña 15'	Report	Maresca 53' (pen.)	Stadium: Balaídos; Attendance: 24,000; Referee: Eduardo Iturralde González

2 October 2005 6	Cádiz	1–1	Celta Vigo	Cádiz
16:00	Fleurquin 14'	Report	Baiano 24'	Stadium: Ramón de Carranza; Attendance: 19,000; Referee: Julián Rodríguez Santiago

16 October 2005 7	Osasuna	2–0	Celta Vigo	Pamplona
16:00	Milošević 48'; Webó 83'	Report		Stadium: Estadio Reyno de Navarra; Attendance: 14,592; Referee: Fernando Teixeira Vitienes

23 October 2005 8	Celta Vigo	1–0	Espanyol	Vigo
16:00	Silva 83'	Report		Stadium: Balaídos; Attendance: 15,000; Referee: Carlos Velasco Carballo

26 October 2005 9	Mallorca	1–0	Celta Vigo	Palma de Mallorca
19:00	Doni 47'	Report		Stadium: Son Moix; Attendance: 10,000; Referee: Manuel Pérez Lima

29 October 2005 10	Athletic Bilbao	1–1	Celta Vigo	Bilbao
21:00	Gurpegui 23'	Report	Ángel 58'	Stadium: San Mamés; Attendance: 38,000; Referee: Alberto Undiano

6 November 2005 11	Celta Vigo	2–1	Deportivo Alavés	Vigo
16:00	Canobbio 27'; Aspas 66'	Report	Astudillo 68'	Stadium: Balaídos; Attendance: 15,000; Referee: Javier Moreno Delgado

20 November 2005 12	Celta Vigo	2–1	Atlético Madrid	Vigo
18:00	Baiano 23'; Canobbio 52'	Report	López 59'	Stadium: Balaídos; Attendance: 28,000; Referee: Alfonso Pérez

26 November 2005 13	Valencia	2–0	Celta Vigo	Valencia
21:00	Aurélio 78'; Villa 82'	Report		Stadium: Mestalla Stadium; Attendance: 40,000; Referee: David Fernández Borbalán

3 December 2005 14	Celta Vigo	2–1	Real Betis	Vigo
17:00	Canobbio 6'; Baiano 20'	Report	Edu 90'	Stadium: Balaídos; Attendance: 22,000; Referee: Vicente Lizondo Cortés

11 December 2005 15	Real Zaragoza	1–0	Celta Vigo	Zaragoza
16:00	Ewerthon 76'	Report		Stadium: La Romareda; Attendance: 28,000; Referee: Luis Medina Cantalejo

17 December 2005 16	Celta Vigo	0–3	Deportivo de La Coruña	Vigo
19:00		Report	Tristán 27' (pen.); Valerón 43'; Capdevila 45'	Stadium: Balaídos; Attendance: 28,500; Referee: Alberto Undiano

20 December 2005 17	Barcelona	2–0	Celta Vigo	Barcelona
20:00	Eto'o 38', 57'	Report		Stadium: Camp Nou; Attendance: 61,994; Referee: Miguel Pérez Lasa

8 January 2006 18	Celta Vigo	1–0	Real Sociedad	Vigo
16:00	Canobbio 25'	Report		Stadium: Balaídos; Attendance: 15,000; Referee: Arturo Daudén Ibáñez

15 January 2006 19	Getafe	1–1	Celta Vigo	Getafe
16:00	Gavilán 41'	Report	Ángel 47'	Stadium: Coliseum Alfonso Pérez; Attendance: 14,000; Referee: Alfonso Pérez

22 January 2006 20	Málaga	0–2	Celta Vigo	Málaga
17:00		Report	Núñez 46'; Silva 71'	Stadium: La Rosaleda Stadium; Attendance: 17,000; Referee: Antonio Rubinos Pérez

29 January 2006 21	Celta Vigo	1–2	Real Madrid	Vigo
20:00	Lequi 39'	Report	Robinho 16'; Cicinho 56'	Stadium: Balaídos; Attendance: 30,000; Referee: Fernando Teixeira Vitienes

5 February 2006 22	Racing de Santander	0–1	Celta Vigo	Santander
16:00		Report	Perera 89'	Stadium: El Sardinero; Attendance: 14,144; Referee: Eduardo Iturralde González

12 February 2006 23	Celta Vigo	1–0	Villarreal	Vigo
16:00	Baiano 38' (pen.)	Report		Stadium: Balaídos; Attendance: 16,000; Referee: Luis Medina Cantalejo

18 February 2006 24	Sevilla	1–0	Celta Vigo	Seville
21:00	Saviola 10'	Report		Stadium: Ramón Sánchez Pizjuán Stadium; Attendance: 40,000; Referee: Manuel Mejuto González

26 February 2006 25	Celta Vigo	2–0	Cádiz	Vigo
16:00	Contreras 37'; Silva 73'	Report		Stadium: Balaídos; Attendance: 13,000; Referee: Alfonso Pino Zamorano

5 March 2006 26	Celta Vigo	2–0	Osasuna	Vigo
16:00	Baiano 4'; Canobbio 71'	Report		Stadium: Balaídos; Attendance: 15,000; Referee: David Fernández Borbalán

11 March 2006 27	Espanyol	2–0	Celta Vigo	Barcelona
17:00	Tamudo 12'; Fredson 38'	Report		Stadium: Estadi Olímpic Lluís Companys; Attendance: 13,652; Referee: Arturo Daudén Ibáñez

19 March 2006 28	Celta Vigo	0–1	Athletic Bilbao	Vigo
20:00		Report	Aduriz 7'	Stadium: Balaídos; Attendance: 15,000; Referee: Miguel Ayza Gámez

22 March 2006 29	Deportivo Alavés	1–0	Celta Vigo	Vitoria-Gasteiz
19:00	Aloisi 86' (pen.)	Report		Stadium: Mendizorrotza Stadium; Attendance: 13,257; Referee: Alberto Undiano

26 March 2006 30	Celta Vigo	2–0	Mallorca	Vigo
16:00	Contreras 6'; Baiano 20'	Report		Stadium: Balaídos; Attendance: 15,000; Referee: Eduardo Iturralde González

2 April 2006 31	Atlético Madrid	0–3	Celta Vigo	Madrid
18:00		Report	Lequi 69'; Baiano 83' (pen.) de Ridder 89'	Stadium: Vicente Calderón Stadium; Attendance: 55,000; Referee: Vicente Lizondo Cortés

8 April 2006 32	Celta Vigo	0–1	Valencia	Vigo
21:00		Report	Angulo 29'	Stadium: Balaídos; Attendance: 19,000; Referee: Rafael Ramírez Domínguez

16 April 2006 33	Real Betis	0–2	Celta Vigo	Seville
16:00		Report	Larena 17'; Perera 88'	Stadium: Manuel Ruiz de Lopera; Attendance: 35,000; Referee: Javier Turienzo Alvarez

22 April 2006 34	Celta Vigo	4–0	Real Zaragoza	Vigo
21:00	Canobbio 30', 82'; Larena 46'; Perera 80'	Report		Stadium: Balaídos; Attendance: 18,000; Referee: Julián Rodríguez Santiago

29 April 2006 35	Deportivo de La Coruña	0–2	Celta Vigo	A Coruña
19:00		Report	Baiano 34'; Perera 87'	Stadium: Estadio Riazor; Attendance: 34,500; Referee: Alfonso Pino Zamorano

3 May 2006 36	Celta Vigo	0–1	Barcelona	Vigo
20:00		Report	Eto'o 55'	Stadium: Balaídos; Attendance: 34,750; Referee: Manuel Pérez Lima

7 May 2006 37	Real Sociedad	2–2	Celta Vigo	San Sebastián
16:00	Prieto 7' (pen.); Skoubo 37'	Report	Baiano 44' (pen.), 56'	Stadium: Anoeta Stadium; Attendance: 25,993; Referee: David Fernández Borbalán

13 May 2006 38	Celta Vigo	1–0	Getafe	Vigo
19:00	López 24'	Report		Stadium: Balaídos; Attendance: 25,000; Referee: Manuel Mejuto González

=== Copa del Rey ===
20 October 2005 Third round	Tenisca	1–3	Celta Vigo	Santa Cruz de La Palma
20:30	Rodríguez 26'	Report	Perera 1', 25', 56'	Stadium: Virgen de Las Nieves; Attendance: 3,000; Referee: Carlos Megía Dávila

9 November 2005 Fourth round	Baza	0–1 (a.e.t.)	Celta Vigo	Baza
20:00		Report	Baiano 120'	Stadium: Constantino Navarro; Attendance: 5,000; Referee: Vicente Lizondo Cortés

4 January 2006 Round of 16; First leg	Celta Vigo	1–1	Real Betis	Vigo
19:00	Perera 22' (pen.)	Report	Lequi 79' (o.g.)	Stadium: Balaídos; Attendance: 16,000; Referee: Carlos Megía Dávila

11 January 2006 Round of 16; Second leg	Real Betis	0–0	Celta Vigo	Seville
19:00		Report		Stadium: Manuel Ruiz de Lopera; Attendance: 25,000; Referee: Eduardo Iturralde González

Real Betis 1–1 Celta Vigo on aggregate. Real Betis won on away goals.
