= 2004–05 Celta de Vigo season =

Celta de Vigo
2004–05 season
- Chairman: Horacio Gómez Araújo
- Manager: Fernando Vázquez
- Stadium: Balaídos
- Segunda División: 2nd
- Copa del Rey: Round of 64
- Top goalscorer: League: Canobbio; Jandro (12); All: Canobbio; Jandro (12)
| Home colours | Away colours |

The 2004–05 Celta de Vigo season was the club's 81st season in its history and its 27th participating in the Segunda División, the second tier of Spanish football.

Heading into the 2004–05 season, the Célticos were looking to return to La Liga after being relegated in the previous season. On the 18 June 2005, the Célticos gained promotion back to La Liga following a 2–0 victory over UE Lleida. Celta narrowly missed out on claiming the Segunda División title on goal difference to Cádiz CF.

Aside from the Segunda División, Celta were involved in the Copa del Rey where they were eliminated in the round of 64 by CD Tenerife.

== Squad ==
=== First team squad ===
Note: Flags indicate national team as defined under FIFA eligibility rules; some limited exceptions apply. Players may hold more than one non-FIFA nationality.

| No. | Pos. | Nation | Player |
|---|---|---|---|
| 2 | MF | ESP | Txomin Nagore |
| 3 | DF | ESP | Israel |
| 4 | MF | ESP | Borja Oubina |
| 5 | MF | BRA | Everton Giovanella |
| 6 | DF | ARG | Eduardo Berizzo |
| 7 | DF | EQG | Yago |
| 8 | DF | ESP | Ángel |
| 9 | FW | ESP | Juan Sánchez |
| 10 | MF | ESP | Jandro |
| 11 | MF | ARG | Gustavo López |
| 12 | DF | ESP | Manolo |
| 13 | GK | ESP | José Manuel Pinto |

| No. | Pos. | Nation | Player |
|---|---|---|---|
| 15 | DF | CHI | Pablo Contreras |
| 16 | MF | ESP | José Ignacio |
| 17 | DF | ARG | Sebastián Méndez |
| 18 | FW | GRE | Zisis Vryzas |
| 19 | MF | ESP | Isaac |
| 20 | FW | ARG | Facundo Sava |
| 21 | MF | POR | Capucho |
| 22 | MF | FRA | Peter Luccin |
| 23 | DF | EQG | Yago |
| 24 | FW | ESP | Catanha |
| 26 | GK | ESP | Roberto |
| 27 | MF | ESP | Jonathan Aspas |

=== Left club during season ===
Note: Flags indicate national team as defined under FIFA eligibility rules; some limited exceptions apply. Players may hold more than one non-FIFA nationality.

| No. / Pos. / Nation / Player; 16 / MF / CRO / Zvonimir Boban | No. / Pos. / Nation / Player; 17 / FW / RSA / Benni McCarthy (on loan to Porto) |

== Competitions ==
=== Legend ===
Win Draw Loss

=== Overall ===
| Competition | Started round | Final position / round | First match | Last match |
|---|---|---|---|---|
| Segunda División | | 2nd | 29 August 2004 | 18 June 2005 |
| Copa del Rey | Round of 64 | | 27 October 2004 | |

=== Competition record ===
| Competition | Record | | | | | | | |
| Competition | G | W | D | L | GF | GA | GD | Win % |
|---|---|---|---|---|---|---|---|---|
| Segunda División | 42 | 22 | 10 | 10 | 55 | 38 | +17 | 52.38 |
| Copa del Rey | 1 | 0 | 0 | 1 | 1 | 3 | −2 | 0.00 |
| Total | 43 | 22 | 10 | 11 | 56 | 41 | +15 | 51.16 |

=== Segunda División ===
==== Matches ====
| 29 August 2004 1 | UD Almería | 0-1 | Celta Vigo |
| | | | Jandro 59' |

| 4 September 2004 2 | Celta Vigo | 1-0 | Gimnastic |
| | Nagore 86' |

| 12 September 2004 3 | Sporting de Gijón | 1-0 | Celta Vigo |
| | Javi Fuego 55' |

| 19 September 2004 4 | Celta Vigo | 1-1 | Recreativo de Huelva |
| | Canobbio 26' | | Uche 13' |

| 26 September 2004 5 | Real Murcia | 1-1 | Celta Vigo |
| | Mariano Fernàndez 80' | | Sava 70' |

| 2 October 2004 6 | Celta Vigo | 2-2 | Alaves |
| | Vryzas 2', 12' | | Rubén Navarro 19' de Lucas 37' (pen.) |

| 9 October 2004 7 | Celta Vigo | 1-1 | Racing de Ferrol |
| | Jandro 25' | | Juanito 20' |

| 17 October 2004 8 | Cádiz | 2-0 | Celta Vigo |
| | Oli 28'; Pavoni 48' |

| 24 October 2004 9 | Celta Vigo | 0-0 | Atlético Malagueño |

| 31 October 2004 10 | UD Salamanca | 0-1 | Celta Vigo |
| | | | Ángel 31' |

| 7 November 2004 11 | Celta Vigo | 1-0 | Polideportivo Ejido |
| | Juan Sánchez 89' |

| 13 November 2004 12 | Córdoba CF | 0-1 | Celta Vigo |
| | | | Contreras 57' |

| 21 November 2004 13 | Celta Vigo | 2-2 | Elche |
| | Jonathan Aspas 63'; Juan Sánchez 82' | | Nino 21 pen.', 33' |

| 27 November 2004 14 | Real Valladolid | 3-3 | Celta Vigo |
| | Aduriz 3'; Hornos 34', 75' | | Canobbio 14'; Jandro 30'; Sava 83' |

| 4 December 2004 15 | Celta Vigo | 1-1 | CD Tenerife |
| | Borja Oubiña 62' | | Vitolo 34' |

| 12 December 2004 16 | Ciudad de Murcia | 2-2 | Celta Vigo |
| | Güiza 12 pen.' Toni González 41' | | Jandro 45 pen.' Vryzas 74' |

| 19 December 2004 17 | Celta Vigo | 2-0 | Pontevedra CF |
| | Vryzas 48'; Juan Sánchez 90' |

| 22 December 2004 18 | Terrassa FC | 1-4 | Celta Vigo |
| | Luis López 71' | | Canobbio 8'; José Ignacio 47'; Juan Sánchez 68'; Jandro 84' |

| 9 January 2005 19 | Celta Vigo | 2-1 | Xerez CD |
| | Sergio 24'; Canobbio 88' | | del Pino 38' |

| 13 February 2005 24 | Celta Vigo | 1–0 | Sporting de Gijón | Balaídos, Vigo |
| 17:00 CET | Canobbio 90' | (Report) | | Referee: Francisco López-Astilleros |

| 20 February 2005 25 | Recreativo Huelva | 1–2 | Celta Vigo | Estadio Nuevo Colombino, Huelva |
| 17:00 CET | Uche 64' | (Report) | Aspas 27'; Vryzas 81' | Referee: Gregorio García |

| 27 February 2005 26 | Celta Vigo | 1–0 | Real Murcia | Balaídos, Vigo |
| 17:00 CET | Canobbio 58' | (Report) | | Referee: Antonio Lahoz |

| 6 March 2005 27 | Alavés | 0–3 | Celta Vigo | Mendizorrotza Stadium, Vitoria-Gasteiz |
| 12:20 CET | | (Report) | Jandro 11', 69', 80' | Referee: Alfonso Izquierdo |

| 12 March 2005 28 | Racing Ferrol | 1–2 | Celta Vigo | Estadio Municipal da Malata, Ferrol |
| 18:30 CET | Bermejo 44' | (Report) | Canobbio 22'; Ángel 82' | Referee: Carlos Ferreiro |

| 20 March 2005 29 | Celta Vigo | 0–2 | Cádiz | Balaídos, Vigo |
| 12:00 CET | | (Report) | de Quintana 61'; Manolo 89' | Referee: Angel Rodríguez |

| 26 March 2005 30 | Málaga B | 0–1 | Celta Vigo | La Rosaleda Stadium, Málaga |
| 18:30 CET | | (Report) | Nagore 62' | Referee: Pedro Franco |

| 2 April 2005 31 | Celta Vigo | 2–0 | Salamanca | Balaídos, Vigo |
| 18:30 CEST | Perera 23', 55' | (Report) | | Referee: Manuel Estévez |

| 10 April 2005 32 | Ejido | 0–3 | Celta Vigo | Estadio Municipal Santo Domingo, El Ejido |
| 12:00 CEST | | (Report) | Perera 10'; Jandro 16'; Canobbio 89' | Referee: Jesús Ibarrola |

| 17 April 2005 33 | Celta Vigo | 0–1 | Córdoba | Balaídos, Vigo |
| 18:00 CEST | | (Report) | Christian 58' | Referee: Carlos Gómez |

| 24 April 2004 34 | Elche | 0–1 | Celta Vigo | Estadio Manuel Martínez Valero, Elche |
| 12:00 CEST | | (Report) | Vryzas 18' | Referee: Romualdo Herreros |

| 1 May 2005 35 | Celta Vigo | 2–0 | Real Valladolid | Balaídos, Vigo |
| 12:00 CEST | Vryzas 50'; Moral 64' | (Report) | | Referee: Manuel Lima |

| 7 May 2005 36 | Tenerife | 3–1 | Celta Vigo | Estadio Heliodoro Rodríguez López, Santa Cruz de Tenerife |
| 17:30 CEST | Keko 24', 72'; Cristo 38' | (Report) | Sava 57' | Referee: José González |

| 14 May 2005 37 | Celta Vigo | 0–1 | Ciudad de Murcia | Balaídos, Vigo |
| 18:00 CEST | | (Report) | Luque 34' | Referee: José Luis Romero |

| 22 May 2005 38 | Pontevedra | 3–1 | Celta Vigo | Estadio Municipal de Pasarón, Pontevedra |
| 12:00 CEST | Reyes 3'; Javi Rodríguez 70'; Jesús 89' | (Report) | Jandro 25' | Referee: Angel Rodríguez |

| 28 May 2005 39 | Celta Vigo | 2–1 | Terrassa | Balaídos, Vigo |
| 21:30 CEST | Perera 63', 69' | (Report) | Juan Carlos 43' | Referee: Miguel Delgado |

| 5 June 2005 40 | Xerez | 1–3 | Celta Vigo | Estadio Municipal de Chapín, Jerez de la Frontera |
| 20:00 CEST | Narváez 42' | (Report) | Canobbio 8', 76'; Perera 10' | Referee: Jesús Sánchez |

| 12 June 2005 41 | Celta Vigo | 1–2 | Eibar | Balaídos, Vigo |
| 21:00 CEST | Sánchez 78' | (Report) | Llorente 28'; Suárez 71' | Referee: Néstor Prieto |

| 18 June 2005 42 | Lleida | 0–2 | Celta Vigo | Lleida, Camp d'Esports |
| 20:45 CEST | | (Report) | Jandro 43'; Perera 86' | Referee: Manuel Estévez |

=== Copa del Rey ===
==== Matches ====
| 27 October 2004 Round of 64 | Tenerife | 3–1 (a.e.t.) | Celta Vigo | Estadio Heliodoro Rodríguez López, Santa Cruz de Tenerife |
| 20:45 CET | Keko 18'; Gavilán 101'; Hidalgo 101' | (Report) | Contreras 12' | Referee: Antonio Lahoz |
