= 2006–07 RC Celta de Vigo season =

Celta Vigo
2006–07 season
- President: Horacio Gómez
- Head coach: Fernando Vázquez (until 9 April); Hristo Stoichkov (from 15 April)
- Stadium: Balaídos
- La Liga: 18th (relegated)
- Copa del Rey: Round of 32
- UEFA Cup: Round of 16
- Top goalscorer: League: Fernando Baiano (15); All: Fernando Baiano (18)
Home colours	Away colours

In the 2006–07 season, Celta Vigo participated in La Liga, the Copa del Rey and the UEFA Cup.

== Squad stats ==
Last updated on 15 February 2021.

No.	Pos	Nat	Player	Total		La Liga		Copa del Rey		UEFA Cup	
No.	Pos	Nat	Player	Apps	Goals	Apps	Goals	Apps	Goals	Apps	Goals
1	GK	(Spain) ESP	Esteban	16	0	4	0	2	0	10	0
3	DF	(Brazil) BRA	George Lucas	2	0	2	0	0	0	0	0
4	MF	(Spain) ESP	Borja Oubiña	38	1	30	1	1	0	6+1	0
5	DF	(Argentina) ARG	Matías Lequi	36	1	22+4	1	2	0	8	0
6	DF	(Portugal) POR	Miguel Areias	1	0	1	0	0	0	0	0
7	MF	(Spain) ESP	Antonio Núñez	32	1	10+13	0	1+1	0	4+3	1
8	DF	(Spain) ESP	Ángel López	45	2	35	2	1	0	9	0
9	FW	(Brazil) BRA	Fernando Baiano	45	18	35	15	0+1	0	5+4	3
11	MF	(Argentina) ARG	Gustavo López	38	4	28+3	3	0	0	4+3	1
12	DF	(Argentina) ARG	Diego Placente	42	0	33+1	0	0	0	8	0
13	GK	(Spain) ESP	José Manuel Pinto	34	0	34	0	0	0	0	0
14	FW	(Spain) ESP	Jesús Perera	24	2	1+16	1	2	0	1+4	1
15	DF	(Chile) CHI	Pablo Contreras	37	0	29+1	0	2	0	4+1	0
16	MF	(Uruguay) URU	Pablo García	21	0	11+3	0	2	0	5	0
17	DF	(Romania) ROU	Gabriel Tamaș	40	0	25+4	0	2	0	8+1	0
18	FW	(Spain) ESP	Antonio Guayre	14	1	2+8	1	1	0	2+1	0
19	DF	(Spain) ESP	Yago Yao	10	1	4+2	1	0	0	3+1	0
20	MF	(Spain) ESP	Jonathan Aspas	31	1	8+13	0	2	0	6+2	1
21	MF	(Spain) ESP	Jorge Larena	22	1	5+11	1	2	0	2+2	0
22	FW	(Netherlands) NED	Daniël de Ridder	5	0	0+3	0	0	0	1+1	0
23	MF	(Brazil) BRA	Nenê	48	9	36+2	8	1	0	9	1
24	MF	(Uruguay) URU	Fabián Canobbio	46	5	32+2	2	0+2	0	8+2	3
25	MF	(Brazil) BRA	Iriney	36	2	25+1	2	1+1	0	7+1	0
30	MF	(Spain) ESP	Jonathan Vila	9	0	2+5	0	0	0	0+2	0
34	MF	(Spain) ESP	Dani Abalo	1	0	0+1	0	0	0	0	0
	GK	(Spain) ESP	Sergio Álvarez	0	0	0	0	0	0	0	0
Players who have left the club after the start of the season:
10	MF	(France) FRA	Habib Bamogo	15	2	4+11	2	0	0	0	0

1. On loan from Porto
2. On loan from Real Madrid
3. On loan from Spartak Moscow
4. On loan from Olympique de Marseille

== Results ==
=== La Liga ===
==== League table ====
Pos	Team	Pld	W	D	L	GF	GA	GD	Pts	Qualification or relegation
16	Real Betis	38	8	16	14	36	49	−13	40 (Note: BET 3–0 ATH; ATH 1–2 BET)	
17	Athletic Bilbao	38	10	10	18	44	62	−18	40	
18	Celta (R)	38	10	9	19	40	59	−19	39	Relegation to the Segunda División
19	Real Sociedad (R)	38	8	11	19	30	46	−16	35	Relegation to the Segunda División
20	Gimnàstic (R)	38	7	7	24	33	67	−34	28	Relegation to the Segunda División

Source: LFP
Rules for classification: 1st points; 2nd head-to-head points; 3rd head-to-head goal difference; 4th head-to-head goals scored; 5th goal difference; 6th number of goals scored; 7th Fair-play points
(R) Relegated

==== Matches ====
28 August 2006 1	Celta Vigo	2 – 3	Barcelona	Vigo, Spain
20:00	Baiano 41'; G. López 64'	Report	55' Eto'o; 59' Messi; 87' Guðjohnsen	Stadium: Balaídos; Attendance: 25,000; Referee: Miguel Pérez Lasa

10 September 2006 2	Gimnàstic de Tarragona	1 – 2	Celta Vigo	Tarragona, Spain
18:00	Portillo 67' (pen.)	Report	48' Baiano; 74' Nenê	Stadium: Nou Estadi de Tarragona; Attendance: 13,000; Referee: Rafael Ramírez Domínguez

17 September 2006 3	Espanyol	2 – 1	Celta Vigo	Barcelona, Spain
19:00	Hurtado 49'; Jônatas 55'	Report	52' Canobbio	Stadium: Estadi Olímpic Lluís Companys; Attendance: 18,300; Referee: Miguel Ayza Gámez

24 September 2006 4	Celta Vigo	0 – 2	Osasuna	Vigo, Spain
19:00		Report	35' Valdo; 89' Juanfran	Stadium: Balaídos; Attendance: 12,000; Referee: Carlos Megía Dávila

1 October 2006 5	Racing Santander	1 – 1	Celta Vigo	Santander, Spain
17:00	Žigić 24'	Report	55' Iriney	Stadium: El Sardinero; Attendance: 15,105; Referee: Vicente Lizondo Cortés

15 October 2006 6	Celta Vigo	3 – 2	Valencia	Vigo, Spain
16:00	Baiano 44'; Iriney 51'; Canobbio 55'	Report	40' Navarro; 62' Morientes	Stadium: Balaídos; Attendance: 18,000; Referee: Eduardo Iturralde González

22 October 2006 7	Athletic Bilbao	0 – 1	Celta Vigo	Bilbao, Spain
16:00		Report	6' Baiano	Stadium: San Mamés; Attendance: 38,000; Referee: Luis Medina Cantalejo

29 October 2006 8	Celta Vigo	1 – 2	Sevilla	Vigo, Spain
16:00	Nenê 3'	Report	30' Poulsen; 61' Adriano	Stadium: Balaídos; Attendance: 15,000; Referee: Alfonso Javier Álvarez Izquierdo

5 November 2006 9	Real Madrid	1 – 2	Celta Vigo	Madrid, Spain
18:00	Emerson 42'	Report	35' Nenê; 81' Larena	Stadium: Santiago Bernabéu Stadium; Attendance: 75,000; Referee: Miguel Pérez Lasa

12 November 2006 10	Celta Vigo	1 – 2	Recreativo de Huelva	Vigo, Spain
16:00	Guayre 82'	Report	48' Sinama Pongolle; 57' Uche	Stadium: Balaídos; Attendance: 13,000; Referee: Miguel Ayza Gámez

19 November 2006 11	Deportivo La Coruña	0 – 1	Celta Vigo	A Coruña, Spain
20:00		Report	73' Nenê	Stadium: Estadio Riazor; Attendance: 30,000; Referee: Carlos Velasco Carballo

26 November 2006 12	Celta Vigo	1 – 1	Real Zaragoza	Vigo, Spain
16:00	Baiano 53'	Report	6' Milito	Stadium: Balaídos; Attendance: 11,000; Referee: Antonio Rubinos Pérez

3 December 2006 13	Real Mallorca	2 – 2	Celta Vigo	Palma de Mallorca, Spain
16:00	Gutiérrez 5'; Janković 51'	Report	57' Baiano; 84' (pen.) Perera	Stadium: Ono Estadi; Attendance: 15,000; Referee: Carlos Clos

10 December 2006 14	Celta Vigo	1 – 1	Villarreal	Vigo, Spain
16:00	Baiano 16'	Report	67' Forlán	Stadium: Balaídos; Attendance: 12,000; Referee: Rafael Ramírez Domínguez

17 December 2006 15	Levante	1 – 1	Celta Vigo	Valencia, Spain
16:00	Álvaro 51'	Report	2' Baiano	Stadium: Ciutat de València; Attendance: 12,532; Referee: Fernando Teixeira Vitienes

20 December 2006 16	Celta Vigo	0 – 0	Real Sociedad	Vigo, Spain
19:00		Report		Stadium: Balaídos; Attendance: 8,000; Referee: Julián Rodríguez Santiago

7 January 2007 17	Real Betis	1 – 0	Celta Vigo	Seville, Spain
16:00	Sóbis 60'	Report		Stadium: Estadio Manuel Ruiz de Lopera; Attendance: 40,000; Referee: Miguel Pérez Lima

14 January 2007 18	Celta Vigo	1 – 3	Atlético Madrid	Vigo, Spain
18:00	Nenê 69'	Report	12', 20' Torres; 52' Agüero	Stadium: Balaídos; Attendance: 12,000; Referee: Javier Turienzo Álvarez

21 January 2007 19	Getafe	1 – 0	Celta Vigo	Getafe, Spain
16:00	del Moral 1'	Report		Stadium: Coliseum Alfonso Pérez; Attendance: 12,000; Referee: Alfonso Pérez

28 January 2007 20	Barcelona	3 – 1	Celta Vigo	Barcelona, Spain
18:00	Saviola 34'; Ronaldinho 77' (pen.); Giuly 85'	Report	56' (pen.) Nenê	Stadium: Camp Nou; Attendance: 68,549; Referee: Carlos Delgado Ferreiro

4 February 2007 21	Celta Vigo	1 – 1	Gimnàstic de Tarragona	Vigo, Spain
16:00	Oubiña 49'	Report	77' Portillo	Stadium: Balaídos; Attendance: 14,000; Referee: David Fernández Borbalán

11 February 2007 22	Celta Vigo	0 – 2	Espanyol	Vigo, Spain
16:00		Report	23' García; 57' Pandiani	Stadium: Balaídos; Attendance: 10,000; Referee: Miguel Pérez Lasa

18 February 2007 23	Osasuna	0 – 1	Celta Vigo	Pamplona, Spain
16:00		Report	2' Baiano	Stadium: Reyno de Navarra; Attendance: 15,647; Referee: Rafael Ramírez Domínguez

25 February 2007 24	Celta Vigo	2 – 2	Racing Santander	Vigo, Spain
16:00	Baiano 25' (pen.); Bamogo 32'	Report	55' Munitis; 78' (pen.) Álvarez	Stadium: Balaídos; Attendance: 13,500; Referee: Luis Medina Cantalejo

3 March 2007 25	Valencia	1 – 0	Celta Vigo	Valencia, Spain
19:00	Morientes 66'	Report		Stadium: Mestalla Stadium; Attendance: 40,000; Referee: Alfonso Javier Álvarez Izquierdo

11 March 2007 26	Celta Vigo	1 – 1	Athletic Bilbao	Vigo, Spain
16:00	Ángel López 35'	Report	68' Aduriz	Stadium: Balaídos; Attendance: 20,000; Referee: César Muñiz Fernández

18 March 2007 27	Sevilla	2 – 0	Celta Vigo	Seville, Spain
20:00	Kanouté 51' (pen.); Kerzhakov 89'	Report		Stadium: Ramón Sánchez Pizjuán; Attendance: 45,000; Referee: Antonio Rubinos Pérez

1 April 2007 28	Celta Vigo	1 – 2	Real Madrid	Vigo, Spain
18:00	Ángel López 42'	Report	27' (pen.) van Nistelrooy; 83' Robinho	Stadium: Balaídos; Attendance: 22,000; Referee: Alfonso Pérez

8 April 2007 29	Recreativo de Huelva	4 – 2	Celta Vigo	Huelva, Spain
16:00	Vázquez 37' (pen.); Roșu 85', 87'; Cheli 90'	Report	73' (pen.), 89' Nenê	Stadium: Nuevo Colombino; Attendance: 17,000; Referee: Julián Rodríguez Santiago

15 April 2007 30	Celta Vigo	1 – 0	Deportivo La Coruña	Vigo, Spain
16:00	Baiano 60'	Report		Stadium: Balaídos; Attendance: 24,000; Referee: Alberto Undiano

22 April 2007 31	Real Zaragoza	2 – 0	Celta Vigo	Zaragoza, Spain
16:00	Ewerthon 71', 75'	Report		Stadium: La Romareda; Attendance: 31,000; Referee: César Muñiz Fernández

29 April 2007 32	Celta Vigo	0 – 3	Real Mallorca	Vigo, Spain
16:00		Report	9' Arango; 22' Varela; 79' López	Stadium: Balaídos; Attendance: 17,000; Referee: Fernando Teixeira Vitienes

6 May 2007 33	Villarreal	1 – 0	Celta Vigo	Villarreal, Spain
16:00	Franco 67'	Report		Stadium: Estadio El Madrigal; Attendance: 16,000; Referee: Manuel Mejuto González

13 May 2007 34	Celta Vigo	1 – 2	Levante	Vigo, Spain
16:00	Baiano 61' (pen.)	Report	38' Reggi; 48' Mustapha	Stadium: Balaídos; Attendance: 24,000; Referee: Antonio Rubinos Pérez

20 May 2007 35	Real Sociedad	3 – 1	Celta Vigo	San Sebastián, Spain
16:00	Kovačević 46'; Sávio 50'; López Rekarte 77'	Report	19' G. López	Stadium: Anoeta; Attendance: 27,015; Referee: Carlos Megía Dávila

27 May 2007 36	Celta Vigo	2 – 1	Real Betis	Vigo, Spain
16:00	G. López 42'; Baiano 90' (pen.)	Report	29' Robert	Stadium: Balaídos; Attendance: 12,803; Referee: Carlos Velasco Carballo

9 June 2007 37	Atlético Madrid	2 – 3	Celta Vigo	Madrid, Spain
20:00	Rodríguez 28', 70'	Report	30' (pen.), 67' Baiano; 47' Yago Yao	Stadium: Estadio Vicente Calderón; Attendance: 45,000; Referee: Alfonso Pérez

17 June 2007 38	Celta Vigo	2 – 1	Getafe	Vigo, Spain
16:00	Bamogo 36'; Lequi 67'	Report	26' Redondo	Stadium: Balaídos; Attendance: 28,620; Referee: Manuel Mejuto González

=== Copa del Rey ===
==== Round of 32 ====
24 October 2006 First leg	Deportivo Alavés	0 – 0	Celta Vigo	Vitoria-Gasteiz, Spain
19:45		Report		Stadium: Campo de Fútbol de Mendizorrotza; Attendance: 1,626; Referee: Javier Turienzo Álvarez

9 November 2006 Second leg	Celta Vigo	0 – 1	Deportivo Alavés	Vigo, Spain
19:45		Report	Wesley 46'	Stadium: Balaídos; Attendance: 5,000; Referee: César Muñiz Fernández

Deportivo Alavés won 1–0 on aggregate

=== UEFA Cup ===
==== First round ====
14 September 2006 First leg	Standard Liège (Belgium)	0 – 1	(Spain) Celta Vigo	Liège, Belgium
20:30 (CET)		Report	38' G. López	Stadium: Stade Maurice Dufrasne; Attendance: 10,000; Referee: Gerald Lehner (Austria)

28 September 2006 Second leg	Celta Vigo (Spain)	3 – 0	(Belgium) Standard Liège	Vigo, Spain
21:00 (CET)	Baiano 22', 83'; Canobbio 70'	Report		Stadium: Balaídos; Attendance: 7,000; Referee: Matteo Trefoloni (Italy)

Celta Vigo won 4–0 on aggregate

==== Group H ====
Team	Pld	W	D	L	GF	GA	GD	Pts
(England) Newcastle United	4	3	1	0	4	1	+3	10
(Spain) Celta Vigo	4	1	2	1	4	4	0	5
(Turkey) Fenerbahçe	4	1	1	2	5	4	+1	4
(Italy) Palermo	4	1	1	2	3	6	−3	4
(Germany) Eintracht Frankfurt	4	0	3	1	4	5	−1	3

2 November 2006 1	Celta Vigo (Spain)	1 – 1	(Germany) Eintracht Frankfurt	Vigo, Spain
21:00 (CET)	Perera 11'	Report	17' Huber	Stadium: Balaídos; Attendance: 10,000; Referee: Stuart Dougal (Scotland)

23 November 2006 2	Newcastle United (England)	2 – 1	(Spain) Celta Vigo	Newcastle upon Tyne, England
19:45 (GMT)	Sibierski 37'; Taylor 86'	Report	9' Canobbio	Stadium: St James' Park; Attendance: 25,100; Referee: Dick van Egmond (Netherlands)

30 November 2006 3	Celta Vigo (Spain)	1 – 0	(Turkey) Fenerbahçe	Vigo, Spain
20:45 (CET)	Canobbio 77'	Report		Stadium: Balaídos; Attendance: 10,000; Referee: Paul Allaerts (Belgium)

13 December 2006 4	Palermo (Italy)	1 – 1	(Spain) Celta Vigo	Palermo, Italy
20:45 (CET)	Tedesco 70'	Report	59' Baiano	Stadium: Stadio Renzo Barbera; Attendance: 10,225; Referee: Craig Thomson (Scotland)

==== Round of 32 ====
15 February 2007 First leg	Spartak Moscow (Russia)	1 – 1	(Spain) Celta Vigo	Moscow, Russia
18:00 (MSK)	Kalynychenko 65'	Report	41' Núñez	Stadium: Luzhniki Stadium; Attendance: 35,000; Referee: Costas Kapitanis (Cyprus)

22 February 2007 Second leg	Celta Vigo (Spain)	2 – 1	(Russia) Spartak Moscow	Vigo, Spain
20:45 (CET)	Nenê 19'; Aspas 78'	Report	88' Titov	Stadium: Balaídos; Attendance: 8,000; Referee: Laurent Duhamel (France)

Celta Vigo won 3–2 on aggregate

==== Round of 16 ====
8 March 2007 First leg	Celta Vigo (Spain)	0 – 1	(Germany) Werder Bremen	Vigo, Spain
20:45 (CET)		Report	84' Almeida	Stadium: Balaídos; Attendance: 9,236; Referee: Robert Małek (Poland)

14 March 2007 Second leg	Werder Bremen (Germany)	2 – 0	(Spain) Celta Vigo	Bremen, Germany
20:45 (CET)	Almeida 48'; Fritz 61'	Report		Stadium: Weserstadion; Attendance: 35,278; Referee: Stefano Farina (Italy)

Werder Bremen won 3–0 on aggregate
