= Canobbio (surname) =

Canobbio is an Italian surname. Notable people with the surname include:

- Agustín Canobbio (born 1998), Uruguayan footballer
- Andrea Canobbio (born 1962), Italian writer and translator
- Carlos Canobbio (born 1982), Uruguayan footballer
- Fabián Canobbio (born 1980), Uruguayan footballer
- Osvaldo Canobbio (born 1973), Uruguayan football manager and player

== See also ==
- Agustín Cannobio (born 1879), Chilean politician, educator, and intellectual
- Canobbio, town in Switzerland
- Cannobio, town in Italy
