= 2001–02 Real Oviedo season =

Real Oviedo
2001–02 season
- President: Eugenio Prieto Álvarez
- Head coach: Enrique Marigil
- Stadium: Estadio Carlos Tartiere
- Segunda División: 7th
- Copa del Rey: Round of 64
- Top goalscorer: League: Geni (10); All: Geni (10)
- Average home league attendance: 14,910

The 2001–02 season is Real Oviedo's first season back in second division of the Spanish football league, the Segunda División, and the 76th as a football club.

== Players ==
=== First-team quad ===
1. Esteban
2. Jaime
3. Javier Gurrutxaga
4. Daniel Amieva
5. Boris
6. Oli
7. Geni
8. Ángel Pérez
9. Óscar Álvarez
10. Viktor Onopko
11. Rubén Reyes
12. Albert Nađ
13. Rubén Suárez Del Río
14. Pablo Díaz
15. Sergio Santamaría
16. Javier Paredes
17. Đorđe Tomić
18. Iván Ania
19. José Jorge Saavedra Muñoz
20. Óscar Pérez
21. Sanchez Tomas
22. Pedro Dorronsoro
23. Pablo Suárez
24. Raúl García

== Competitions ==
=== Overall record ===
Competition	First match	Last match	Starting round	Final position	Record							
Competition	First match	Last match	Starting round	Final position	Pld	W	D	L	GF	GA	GD	Win %
Segunda División	26 August 2001	25 May 2002	Matchday 1	7th	42	13	19	10	41	40	+1	30.95
Copa del Rey	10 October 2001		Round of 64	Round of 64	1	0	0	1	2	4	−2	0.00
Total					43	13	19	11	43	44	−1	30.23

Source: Competitions

=== Serie A ===
==== League table ====
Pos	Team	Pld	W	D	L	GF	GA	GD	Pts
5	Elche	42	17	14	11	52	39	+13	65
6	Sporting Gijón	42	17	13	12	57	47	+10	64
7	Oviedo	42	13	19	10	41	40	+1	58 (Note: OVI 1–0 EIB; EIB 1–1 OVI)
8	Eibar	42	14	16	12	41	27	+14	58
9	Racing Ferrol	42	16	8	18	58	60	−2	56 (Note: ALB 2–1 RFE; RFE 2–0 ALB)

Source: LFP - Liga Adelante
Rules for classification: 1st points; 2nd head-to-head points; 3rd head-to-head goal difference; 4th head-to-head goals scored; 5th goal difference; 6th number of goals scored; 7th Fair-play points

==== Results summary ====
Overall								Home						Away					
Pld	W	D	L	GF	GA	GD	Pts	W	D	L	GF	GA	GD	W	D	L	GF	GA	GD
0	0	0	0	0	0	0	0	0	0	0	0	0	0	0	0	0	0	0	0

Source: Segunda División

==== Results by round ====
Round	1	2	3	4	5	6	7	8	9	10	11	12	13	14	15	16	17	18	19	20	21	22	23	24	25	26	27	28	29	30	31	32	33	34	35	36	37	38	39	40	41	42
Ground	H	A	H	A	H	A	H	A	H	A	H	A	H	A	H	A	H	A	H	A	H	A	H	A	H	A	H	A	H	A	H	A	H	A	H	A	H	A	H	A	H	A
Result	D	D	W	W	W	W	D	D	D	W	L	L	D	D	W	L	W	D	D	L	W	D	D	D	D	D	W	W	D	L	D	D	W	W	D	W	L	D	L	L	L	L
Position																																										

Source: Segunda División
A = Away; H = Home; W = Win; D = Draw; L = Loss

==== Matches ====
26 August 2001 1	Oviedo	1–1	Extremadura	Oviedo
CEST (UTC+2)				Stadium: Carlos Tartiere

2 September 2001 2	Racing Santander	1–1	Oviedo	Santander
CEST (UTC+2)				Stadium: Campos de Sport de El Sardinero

9 September 2001 3	Oviedo	2–0	Burgos	Oviedo
CEST (UTC+2)				Stadium: Carlos Tartiere

16 September 2001 4	Real Jaén	1–3	Oviedo	Jaén
CEST (UTC+2)				Stadium: Nuevo Estadio de La Victoria

23 September 2001 5	Oviedo	1–0	Eibar	Oviedo
CEST (UTC+2)				Stadium: Carlos Tartiere

30 September 2001 6	Racing Ferrol	0–2	Oviedo	Ferrol
CEST (UTC+2)				Stadium: Estadio Municipal da Malata

3 October 2001 7	Oviedo	0–0	Leganés	Oviedo
CEST (UTC+2)				Stadium: Carlos Tartiere

6 October 2001 8	Levante	0–0	Oviedo	Valencia
CEST (UTC+2)				Stadium: Estadi Ciutat de València

14 October 2001 9	Oviedo	0–0	Salamanca	Oviedo
CEST (UTC+2)				Stadium: Carlos Tartiere

21 October 2001 10	Recreativo	0–2	Oviedo	Huelva
CEST (UTC+2)				Stadium: Estadio Nuevo Colombino

28 October 2001 11	Oviedo	0–2	Sporting Gijón	Oviedo
CEST (UTC+2)				Stadium: Carlos Tartiere

4 November 2001 12	Badajoz	1–0	Oviedo	Badajoz
CEST (UTC+2)				Stadium: Estadio Nuevo Vivero

7 November 2001 13	Oviedo	0–0	Numancia	Oviedo
CEST (UTC+2)				Stadium: Carlos Tartiere

11 November 2001 14	Albacete	1–1	Oviedo	Albacete
CEST (UTC+2)				Stadium: Estadio Carlos Belmonte

18 November 2001 15	Oviedo	3–1	Córdoba	Oviedo
CEST (UTC+2)				Stadium: Carlos Tartiere

24 November 2001 16	Elche	2–0	Oviedo	Elche
CEST (UTC+2)				Stadium: Estadio Manuel Martínez Valero

2 December 2001 17	Oviedo	2–0	Real Murcia	Oviedo
CEST (UTC+2)				Stadium: Carlos Tartiere

9 December 2001 18	Atlético Madrid	0–0	Oviedo	Madrid
CEST (UTC+2)				Stadium: Vicente Calderón Stadium

16 December 2001 19	Oviedo	1–1	Poli Ejico	Oviedo
CEST (UTC+2)				Stadium: Carlos Tartiere

23 December 2001 20	Gimnàstic Tarragona	1–0	Oviedo	Tarragona
CEST (UTC+2)				Stadium: Nou Estadi de Tarragona

5 January 2002 21	Oviedo	1–0	Xerez	Oviedo
CEST (UTC+2)				Stadium: Carlos Tartiere

13 January 2002 22	Extremadura	1–1	Oviedo	Almendralejo
CEST (UTC+2)				Stadium: Estadio Francisco de la Hera

20 January 2002 23	Oviedo	0–0	Racing Santander	Oviedo
CEST (UTC+2)				Stadium: Carlos Tartiere

27 January 2002 24	Burgos	1–1	Oviedo	Burgos
CEST (UTC+2)				Stadium: Estadio El Plantío

2 February 2002 25	Oviedo	0–0	Real Jaén	Oviedo
CEST (UTC+2)				Stadium: Carlos Tartiere

6 February 2002 26	Eibar	1–1	Oviedo	Eibar
CEST (UTC+2)

9 February 2002 27	Oviedo	2–1	Racing Ferrol	Oviedo
CEST (UTC+2)				Stadium: Carlos Tartiere

16 February 2002 28	Leganés	1–3	Oviedo	Leganés
CEST (UTC+2)

24 February 2002 29	Oviedo	1–1	Levante	Oviedo
CEST (UTC+2)				Stadium: Carlos Tartiere

3 March 2002 30	Salamanca	3–0	Oviedo	Villares de la Reina
CEST (UTC+2)				Stadium: Helmántico Stadium

10 March 2002 31	Oviedo	1–1	Recreativo Huelva	Oviedo
CEST (UTC+2)				Stadium: Carlos Tartiere

17 March 2002 32	Sporting Gijón	0–0	Oviedo	Gijón
CEST (UTC+2)				Stadium: El Molinón

24 March 2002 33	Oviedo	1–0	Badajoz	Oviedo
CEST (UTC+2)				Stadium: Carlos Tartiere

30 March 2002 34	Numancia	1–2	Oviedo	Soria
CEST (UTC+2)

7 April 2002 35	Oviedo	0–0	Albacete	Oviedo
CEST (UTC+2)				Stadium: Carlos Tartiere

14 April 2002 36	Córdoba	0–1	Oviedo	Córdoba
CEST (UTC+2)				Stadium: Estadio Nuevo Arcángel

21 May 2002 37	Oviedo	3–6	Elche	Oviedo
CEST (UTC+2)				Stadium: Carlos Tartiere

28 April 2002 38	Murcia	1–1	Oviedo	Murcia
CEST (UTC+2)

5 May 2002 39	Oviedo	2–3	Atlético Madrid	Oviedo
CEST (UTC+2)				Stadium: Carlos Tartiere

12 May 2002 40	Poli Ejido	3–0	Oviedo	El Ejido
CEST (UTC+2)

19 May 2002 41	Oviedo	0–2	Gimnàstic de Tarragona	Oviedo
CEST (UTC+2)				Stadium: Carlos Tartiere

25 May 2002 42	Xerez	2–1	Oviedo	Jerez de la Frontera
CEST (UTC+2)

=== Copa del Rey ===
10 October 2001 Round of 64	Sporting Gijón	4–2	Oviedo	Gijón
CEST (UTC+2)				Stadium: El Molinón
