= Esteban (footballer) =

Spanish footballer

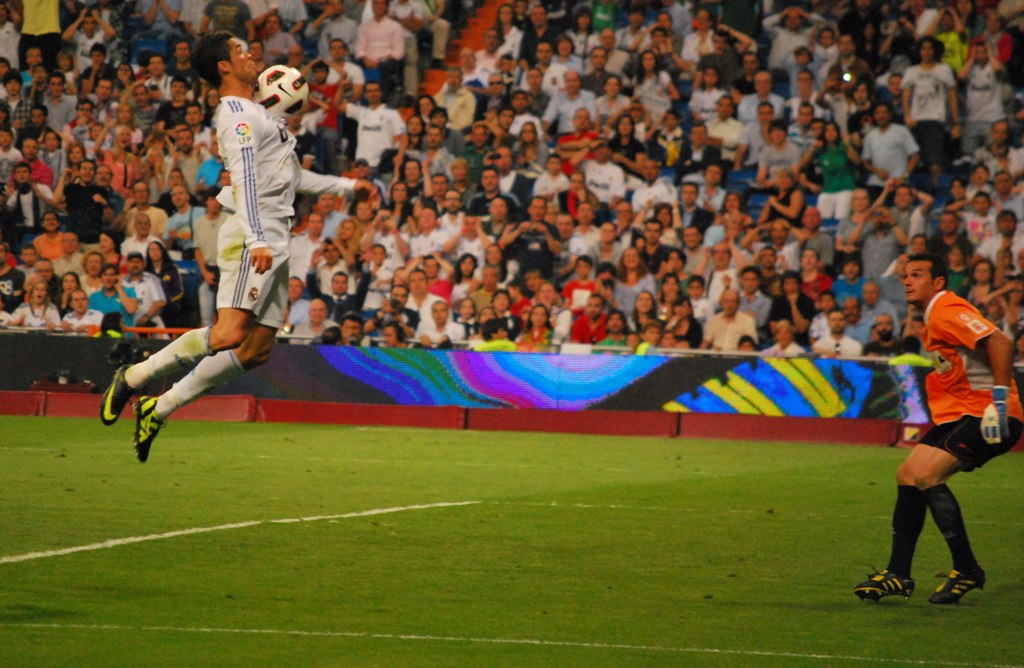
- Esteban in action for Almería (2011)

Personal information
- Full name: Esteban Andrés Suárez
- Date of birth: 27 June 1975 (age 51)
- Place of birth: Avilés, Spain
- Height: 1.77 m (5 ft 10 in)
- Position: Goalkeeper

Youth career
- Navarro

Senior career*
Years	Team	Apps	(Gls)
1993–1995	Navarro	46	(0)
1995–1996	Avilés	40	(0)
1996–1997	Oviedo B	40	(0)
1997–2002	Oviedo	182	(0)
2002–2003	Atlético Madrid	23	(0)
2003–2005	Sevilla	58	(0)
2005–2008	Celta	33	(0)
2008–2014	Almería	136	(0)
2014–2017	Oviedo	68	(0)
Total		626	(0)

International career
1998	Spain U21	1	(0)
2000–2002	Asturias	3	(0)
- * Club domestic league appearances and goals

Esteban Andrés Suárez (born 27 June 1975), known simply as Esteban, is a Spanish former professional footballer who played as a goalkeeper.

He started and finished his extensive senior career, which spanned more than two decades, at Real Oviedo. He appeared in 280 matches in La Liga over 13 seasons, also representing in the competition Atlético Madrid, Sevilla, Celta and Almería.

== Club career ==
=== Early years ===
Born in Avilés, Asturias, Esteban began his career with hometown's SD Navarro CF in 1993, but soon moved to local giants Real Oviedo after a stint at Real Avilés Industrial CF. In five seasons with the first team, four of those spent in La Liga, he only missed a total of 12 league games, and moved to Atlético Madrid in summer 2002 as the Colchoneros had just returned to the top flight after a two-year absence, finishing the campaign as starter after beginning as understudy to Germán Burgos.

Esteban joined fellow top-division club Sevilla FC in August 2003. After two solid seasons with the Andalusians (two sixth league places, as first choice) he signed for RC Celta de Vigo, backing up José Manuel Pinto in the Segunda División side until the latter moved to FC Barcelona in January 2008.

=== Almería ===
In the 2008 off-season, Esteban joined UD Almería in the top tier, where he was second choice to Diego Alves in his first year. However, profiting from injury to the starter in late March 2009, he was put between the posts and remained there until the end of the season even when the Brazilian recovered.

In the 2009–10 campaign, Esteban's league output consisted of 30 minutes – the last round notwithstanding– after Alves was sent off in a 0–3 home defeat against Valencia CF. At the season's end, however, the 35-year-old renewed his contract for another year.

Esteban continued as Alves' backup in 2010–11. He was the starter, however, in Almería's Copa del Rey run, which saw the club reach the competition's semi-finals for the first time ever. In the final stretch of the campaign, as they were already relegated and Alves announced his departure to Valencia, he appeared in four matches and conceded 11 goals, including eight in a 8–1 loss at Real Madrid.

Subsequently, at 36, Esteban became Almería's first choice. He played all 42 league games during the second-division season, conceding 43 goals as the team finished seventh.

Esteban did not miss one single match in the 2013–14 campaign, as the Rojiblancos were again in the Spanish top flight and managed to stay afloat.

=== Return to Oviedo ===
On 13 May 2014, Esteban announced he was returning to Oviedo twelve years after leaving. An undisputed starter in his first two seasons, he was overtaken by new signing Juan Carlos in 2016–17.

On 29 June 2017, despite Esteban's willingness to play a further season, he retired and was immediately included in the club's backroom staff.

== Career statistics ==
Appearances and goals by club, season and competition
Club	Season	League			National cup		Europe		Other		Total	
Club	Season	Division	Apps	Goals	Apps	Goals	Apps	Goals	Apps	Goals	Apps	Goals
Avilés	1994–95	Segunda División B	2	0	1	0	—		—		3	0
Avilés	1995–96	Segunda División B	38	0	0	0	—		6	0	44	0
Avilés	Total		40	0	1	0	—		6	0	47	0
Oviedo B	1996–97	Segunda División B	37	0	—		—		—		37	0
Oviedo B	1997–98	Segunda División B	3	0	—		—		—		3	0
Oviedo B	Total		40	0	—		—		—		40	0
Oviedo	1997–98	La Liga	28	0	1	0	—		—		29	0
Oviedo	1998–99	La Liga	37	0	0	0	—		—		37	0
Oviedo	1999–2000	La Liga	38	0	0	0	—		—		38	0
Oviedo	2000–01	La Liga	38	0	0	0	—		—		38	0
Oviedo	2001–02	Segunda División	41	0	1	0	—		—		42	0
Oviedo	Total		182	0	2	0	—		—		184	0
Atlético Madrid	2002–03	La Liga	23	0	3	0	—		—		26	0
Sevilla	2003–04	La Liga	30	0	8	0	—		—		38	0
Sevilla	2004–05	La Liga	28	0	0	0	9	0	—		37	0
Sevilla	Total		58	0	8	0	9	0	—		75	0
Celta	2005–06	La Liga	2	0	4	0	—		—		6	0
Celta	2006–07	La Liga	4	0	2	0	10	0	—		16	0
Celta	2007–08	Segunda División	27	0	1	0	—		—		28	0
Celta	Total		33	0	7	0	10	0	—		50	0
Almería	2008–09	La Liga	7	0	4	0	—		—		11	0
Almería	2009–10	La Liga	2	0	2	0	—		—		4	0
Almería	2010–11	La Liga	5	0	8	0	—		—		13	0
Almería	2011–12	Segunda División	42	0	0	0	—		—		42	0
Almería	2012–13	Segunda División	42	0	0	0	—		4	0	46	0
Almería	2013–14	La Liga	38	0	0	0	—		—		38	0
Almería	Total		136	0	14	0	—		4	0	154	0
Oviedo	2014–15	Segunda División B	38	0	2	0	—		3	0	43	0
Oviedo	2015–16	Segunda División	30	0	0	0	—		—		30	0
Oviedo	2016–17	Segunda División	0	0	1	0	—		—		1	0
Oviedo	Total		68	0	3	0	—		3	0	74	0
Career total			580	0	38	0	19	0	13	0	650	0

== Honours ==
Oviedo

- Segunda División B: 2014–15

Spain U21

- UEFA European Under-21 Championship: 1998
