= Alberto Suárez =

Alberto Suárez may refer to:

- Alberto Suárez (footballer) (born 1981), Spanish football player
- Alberto Suárez Inda (born 1939), Mexican prelate of the Roman Catholic Church
- Alberto Suárez (football manager) (born 1961), Colombian football manager
- Alberto Suárez Laso (born 1977), Spanish athlete
