= Rubén Reyes =

Spanish footballer and manager

Personal information
- Full name: Rubén Reyes Díaz
- Date of birth: 5 January 1979 (age 47)
- Place of birth: Gijón, Spain
- Height: 1.86 m (6 ft 1 in)
- Position: Midfielder

Youth career
- Sporting Gijón

Senior career*
Years	Team	Apps	(Gls)
1998–2000	Avilés	35	(1)
2000–2001	Oviedo B	13	(8)
2000–2002	Oviedo	51	(2)
2002	Villarreal	5	(0)
2003–2004	Getafe	10	(0)
2004–2006	Albacete	4	(0)
2005	→ Pontevedra (loan)	15	(1)
2006	→ Pontevedra (loan)	15	(2)
2006–2007	Pontevedra	33	(7)
2007–2010	Rayo Vallecano	53	(1)
2010–2011	Pontevedra	18	(0)
2011–2012	Palencia	29	(0)
2012–2013	Alcobendas Sport	9	(0)
Total		290	(22)

Managerial career
- 2013–2015: Alcobendas Sport
- 2016–2017: Alcobendas Sport
- * Club domestic league appearances and goals

Rubén Reyes Díaz (Spanish pronunciation: [ruˈβen ˈreʝes]; born 5 January 1979) is a Spanish former professional footballer who played as a midfielder.

In a career spent mainly in the lower leagues, Reyes amassed Segunda División totals of 89 games and three goals in representation of five clubs. He appeared for Oviedo and Villarreal in La Liga, totalling 21 matches.

== Club career ==
Born in Gijón, Asturias, Reyes began his professional career with local Real Avilés Industrial in the Segunda División B. For the 2000–01 season he moved to La Liga with neighbouring Real Oviedo, making his first appearance in the competition on 22 October 2000 in the 3–1 home win against RC Celta de Vigo. The following month, he scored in a 4–1 victory over Real Valladolid also at the Estadio Carlos Tartiere, but the club eventually failed to retain its status as third from bottom.

Ahead of 2002–03, Reyes joined Villarreal CF again in the top division, for three years. He appeared rarely for the Valencian team, and finished the campaign with Segunda División's Getafe CF; in the following season, also with the Madrid side, he achieved a first-ever promotion to the top flight, but only saw action in two games (both from the bench).

Reyes then signed for Albacete Balompié, but did not play one single second in the first part of 2004–05, due to injury. From January–June 2005 he was loaned to Pontevedra CF in the second division, playing 15 matches in a relegation-ending campaign; the same befell in the following year's January transfer window, with the club now one league down, and staying down after failing in the promotion play-offs.

After being released by Albacete, Reyes joined Pontevedra on a permanent basis, being one of the Galicians' cornerstones in 2006–07, although they once again did not promote. The following campaign, he agreed to a contract at Rayo Vallecano, returning to the second tier at the first attempt.
