= Geni (footballer) =

Spanish footballer (born 1980)

Personal information
- Full name: Eugenio Suárez Santos
- Date of birth: 4 February 1980 (age 46)
- Place of birth: Gijón, Spain
- Height: 1.79 m (5 ft 10 1/2 in)
- Position: Forward

Youth career
- Avilés
- Oviedo

Senior career*
Years	Team	Apps	(Gls)
1998–2001	Oviedo B	65	(16)
1999–2003	Oviedo	89	(17)
2003–2006	Rayo Vallecano	100	(26)
2006–2009	Jaén	108	(27)
2009–2012	Alavés	102	(21)
2012–2015	Avilés	97	(11)
2015–2017	Marino	59	(11)
Total		620	(129)
- * Club domestic league appearances and goals

Eugenio Suárez Santos (born 4 February 1980), known as Geni, is a Spanish former professional footballer who played as a forward.

== Club career ==
Born in Gijón, Asturias, Geni emerged through neighbours Real Oviedo's youth system, making his first-team debut not yet aged 19 as the club was then in La Liga. Definitely promoted to the main squad in 2000, he would see them drop two tiers in only two years.

Geni then moved to Rayo Vallecano of Segunda División, playing 30 total games without scoring in his first season, which ended in another relegation, and leaving in 2006 to another side in the Segunda División B, Real Jaén, where he appeared and scored regularly.

In summer 2009, Geni signed for Deportivo Alavés, with the Basques in division three. He continued competing there until the end of the 2014–15 campaign, also representing Real Avilés Industrial CF.

== Personal life ==
Geni's younger brother, Alberto, was also a footballer. He spent the vast majority of his career in the third tier.
