= 2003–04 Sevilla FC season =

Sevilla FC
2003–04 season
- President: José María del Nido Benavente
- Head coach: Joaquín Caparrós
- Stadium: Unknown
- La Liga: 6th
- Copa del Rey: Semi-Finals
- Top goalscorer: League: Júlio Baptista (20); All: Júlio Baptista (24)
- Highest home attendance: Unknown
- Lowest home attendance: Unknown
- Average home league attendance: Unknown
- Biggest win: Cerro Reyes 1-7 Sevilla FC
- Biggest defeat: Real Madrid 5–1 Sevilla

The 2003–04 season was Sevilla FC's 114th season in existence and the club's third consecutive season in the top flight of Spanish football.

== Competitions ==
=== Overview ===
Competition	First match	Last match	Starting round	Final position	Record							
Competition	First match	Last match	Starting round	Final position	Pld	W	D	L	GF	GA	GD	Win %
La Liga	31 August 2003	23 May 2004	Matchday 1	6th	38	15	10	13	56	45	+11	39.47
Copa del Rey	9 October 2003	17 March 2004	Round of 64	Semi_Finals	8	6	0	2	18	7	+11	75.00
Total					46	21	10	15	74	52	+22	45.65

Source: Competitions

=== La Liga ===
==== League table ====
Pos	Team	Pld	W	D	L	GF	GA	GD	Pts	Qualification or relegation
4	Real Madrid	38	21	7	10	72	54	+18	70	Qualification for the Champions League third qualifying round
5	Athletic Bilbao	38	15	11	12	53	49	+4	56	Qualification for the UEFA Cup first round
6	Sevilla	38	15	10	13	56	45	+11	55 (Note: SEV 2–0 ATM; ATM 2–1 SEV)	Qualification for the UEFA Cup first round
7	Atlético Madrid	38	15	10	13	51	53	−2	55	Qualification for the Intertoto Cup third round
8	Villarreal	38	15	9	14	47	49	−2	54	Qualification for the Intertoto Cup second round

Source: LFP
Rules for classification: 1st points; 2nd head-to-head points; 3rd head-to-head goal difference; 4th head-to-head goals scored; 5th goal difference; 6th number of goals scored; 7th Fair-play points

==== Results summary ====
Overall								Home						Away					
Pld	W	D	L	GF	GA	GD	Pts	W	D	L	GF	GA	GD	W	D	L	GF	GA	GD
38	15	10	13	56	45	+11	55	12	2	5	30	15	+15	3	8	8	26	30	−4

==== Results by round ====
Round	1	2	3	4	5	6	7	8	9	10	11	12	13	14	15	16	17	18	19	20	21	22	23	24	25	26	27	28	29	30	31	32	33	34	35	36	37	38
Ground	H	A	H	A	H	A	H	A	H	A	H	A	H	A	H	A	A	H	A	A	H	A	H	A	H	A	H	A	H	A	H	A	H	A	H	H	A	H
Result	W	D	L	D	W	D	D	D	D	L	W	L	L	W	W	L	L	W	D	L	L	L	W	W	W	D	W	L	L	L	W	D	W	D	W	L	W	W
Position	4	6	9	10	9	8	8	10	9	14	10	12	13	13	7	11	13	11	11	12	15	15	13	10	10	10	8	9	10	11	9	9	9	10	7	9	7	6

A = Away; H = Home; W = Win; D = Draw; L = Loss

==== Matches ====
31 August 2003 1	Sevilla	1–0	Atlético Madrid	Seville
				Stadium: Ramón Sánchez Pizjuán

3 September 2003 2	Barcelona	0-4	Sevilla	Barcelona
				Stadium: Camp Nou; Attendance: 43,841

13 September 2003 3	Sevilla	1–2	Deportivo La Coruña	Seville
				Stadium: Ramón Sánchez Pizjuán

21 September 2003 4	Mallorca	1–1	Sevilla	Palma
				Stadium: Estadi de Son Moix

28 September 2003 5	Sevilla	1–0	Murcia	Seville
				Stadium: Ramón Sánchez Pizjuán

5 October 2003 6	Real Sociedad	1–1	Sevilla	San Sebastián
				Stadium: Anoeta Stadium

19 October 2003 7	Sevilla	2–2	Real Betis	Seville
				Stadium: Ramón Sánchez Pizjuán

26 October 2003 8	Villarreal	3–3	Sevilla	Villarreal
				Stadium: El Madrigal

29 October 2003 9	Sevilla	1–1	Valladolid	Seville
				Stadium: Ramón Sánchez Pizjuán

2 November 2003 10	Málaga	2–0	Sevilla	Málaga
				Stadium: La Rosaleda Stadium

9 November 2003 11	Sevilla	4–1	Real Madrid	Seville
				Stadium: Ramón Sánchez Pizjuán

23 November 2003 12	Espanyol	1–0	Sevilla	Barcelona
				Stadium: Estadi Olímpic Lluís Companys

30 November 2003 13	Sevilla	0–1	Celta Vigo	Seville
				Stadium: Ramón Sánchez Pizjuán

4 December 2003 14	Racing Santander	0–4	Sevilla	Santander
				Stadium: Campos de Sport de El Sardinero

7 December 2003 15	Sevilla	3–2	Zaragoza	Seville
				Stadium: Ramón Sánchez Pizjuán

14 December 2003 16	Athletic Bilbao	2–1	Sevilla	Bilbao
				Stadium: San Mamés

20 December 2003 17	Valencia	1–0	Sevilla	Valencia
				Stadium: Mestalla

4 January 2004 18	Sevilla	2–0	Albacete	Seville
				Stadium: Ramón Sánchez Pizjuán

11 January 2004 19	Osasuna	1–1	Sevilla	Pamplona
				Stadium: El Sadar

18 January 2004 20	Atlético Madrid	2–1	Sevilla	Madrid
				Stadium: Vicente Calderón Stadium

25 January 2004 21	Sevilla	0–1	Barcelona	Seville
				Stadium: Ramón Sánchez Pizjuán

1 February 2004 22	Deportivo La Coruña	1–0	Sevilla	A Coruña
				Stadium: Riazor

8 February 2004 23	Sevilla	3–0	Mallorca	Seville
				Stadium: Ramón Sánchez Pizjuán

14 February 2004 24	Murcia	1–3	Sevilla	Murcia
				Stadium: Estadio Nueva Condomina

21 February 2004 25	Sevilla	1–0	Real Sociedad	Seville
				Stadium: Ramón Sánchez Pizjuán

28 February 2004 26	Real Betis	1–1	Sevilla	Seville
				Stadium: Benito Villamarín

7 March 2004 27	Sevilla	2–0	Villarreal	Seville
				Stadium: Ramón Sánchez Pizjuán

14 March 2004 28	Valladolid	2–0	Sevilla	Valladolid
				Stadium: José Zorrilla

21 March 2004 29	Sevilla	0–1	Málaga	Seville
				Stadium: Ramón Sánchez Pizjuán

28 March 2004 30	Real Madrid	5–1	Sevilla	Valladolid
				Stadium: José Zorrilla

4 April 2004 31	Sevilla	1–0	Espanyol	Seville
				Stadium: Ramón Sánchez Pizjuán

10 April 2004 32	Celta Vigo	0–0	Sevilla	Vigo
				Stadium: Balaídos

18 April 2004 33	Sevilla	5–2	Racing Santander	Seville
				Stadium: Ramón Sánchez Pizjuán

25 April 2004 34	Zaragoza	4–4	Sevilla	Zaragoza
				Stadium: La Romareda

2 May 2004 35	Sevilla	2–0	Athletic Bilbao	Seville
				Stadium: Ramón Sánchez Pizjuán

9 May 2004 36	Sevilla	0–2	Valencia	Seville
				Stadium: Ramón Sánchez Pizjuán

16 May 2004 37	Albacete	1–4	Sevilla	Albacete
				Stadium: Estadio Carlos Belmonte

23 May 2004 38	Sevilla	1–0	Osasuna	Seville
				Stadium: Ramón Sánchez Pizjuán

=== Copa del Rey ===
9 October 2003 Round of 64	Cerro de Reyes	1–7	Sevilla	Badajoz
				Stadium: Estadio José Pache

17 December 2003 Round of 32	Lanzarote	0–1	Sevilla	Arrecife
				Stadium: Ciudad Deportiva de Lanzarote

8 January 2004 Round of 16; First leg	Villarreal	1–3	Sevilla	Villarreal
				Stadium: El Madrigal

15 January 2004 Round of 16; Second leg	Sevilla	0–2 (3–3 (a) agg.)	Villarreal	Seville
				Stadium: Ramón Sánchez Pizjuán

21 January 2004 Quarter-finals; First leg	Sevilla	4–0	Atlético Madrid	Seville
				Stadium: Ramón Sánchez Pizjuán

28 January 2004 Quarter-finals; Second leg	Atlético Madrid	1–2 (1–6 agg.)	Sevilla	Madrid
				Stadium: Vicente Calderón Stadium

4 February 2004 Semi-finals; First leg	Real Madrid	2–0	Sevilla	Madrid
				Stadium: Santiago Bernabéu

11 February 2004 Semi-finals; Second leg	Sevilla	1–0 (1–2 agg.)	Real Madrid	Seville
				Stadium: Ramón Sánchez Pizjuán
