= Carlos Canobbio =

Uruguayan footballer (born 1982)

Personal information
- Full name: Carlos Alberto Canobbio Bentaberry
- Date of birth: 7 January 1982 (age 44)
- Place of birth: Montevideo, Uruguay
- Height: 1.85 m (6 ft 1 in)
- Position: Centre-back

Team information
- Current team: Fénix (manager)

Youth career
- Progreso

Senior career*
Years	Team	Apps	(Gls)
2000–2004	Progreso		
2005–2006	Colonia	25	(0)
2006	Rentistas	7	(0)
2007	Cerro Reyes	12	(1)
2007	Onda		
2008	Buñol		
2008–2009	Makedonikos		
2009–2010	Olímpic Xàtiva		
2011–2013	Progreso		
2013–2015	Danubio	11	(0)
2015–2021	Progreso	37	(0)

Managerial career
- 2021–2022: Liverpool Montevideo (assistant)
- 2022: Basáñez
- 2022–2024: Progreso
- 2025: La Luz
- 2026–: Fénix
- * Club domestic league appearances and goals

Carlos Alberto Canobbio Bentaberry (born 7 January 1982) is a Uruguayan former footballer who played as a central defender. He is the current manager of Fénix.

== Club career ==
Born in Montevideo, Canobbio started playing professionally with C.A. Progreso, going on to represent in his homeland Deportivo Colonia and C.A. Rentistas. He competed abroad the next four years, with Spain's AD Cerro de Reyes, CD Onda, CD Buñol and CD Olímpic de Xàtiva and Greek club Makedonikos FC, always in the lower leagues.

In 2011, Canobbio returned to his country and Progreso, recently returned to the Primera División. He was still part of the squad – as well as captain – when they managed another promotion six years later, with his brother acting as chairman.

== Personal life ==
Canobbio's older brother, Fabián, was also a footballer. A midfielder, he also played in Spain but with much more success, notably winning La Liga and the UEFA Cup with Valencia CF; they shared teams at Progreso.
