= Alberto Suárez (footballer) =

Spanish footballer (born 1981)

Personal information
- Full name: Alberto Suárez Santos
- Date of birth: 20 October 1981 (age 45)
- Place of birth: Gijón, Spain
- Height: 1.79 m (5 ft 10 1/2 in)
- Position: Forward

Senior career*
Years	Team	Apps	(Gls)
2000–2001	Astur	34	(9)
2001–2003	Oviedo B	67	(15)
2003–2004	Alavés B	33	(6)
2004–2007	Eibar	33	(2)
2007–2008	Marino	18	(5)
2008–2009	Jaén	15	(1)
2009–2010	Cultural Leonesa	21	(0)
Total		221	(38)
- * Club domestic league appearances and goals

Alberto Suárez Santos (born 20 October 1981) is a Spanish former professional footballer who played as a forward.

== Career ==
Born in Gijón, Asturias, Suárez spent the vast majority of his career in the Segunda División B or lower. Over a ten-year senior spell he represented Astur CF, Real Oviedo Vetusta, Deportivo Alavés B, SD Eibar – his only Segunda División experience, in the 2004–05 season– Marino de Luanco, Real Jaén and Cultural y Deportiva Leonesa.

Suárez scored the first of two second-tier goals on 14 May 2005, but in a 3–2 away loss against Gimnàstic de Tarragona.

== Personal life ==
Suárez's older brother, Eugenio, was also a professional footballer. More successful, he played more than 90 competitive games with Oviedo.
