= Jandro (footballer, born 1979) =

Spanish footballer

Personal information
- Full name: Alejandro Castro Fernández
- Date of birth: 27 February 1979 (age 47)
- Place of birth: Mieres, Spain
- Height: 1.75 m (5 ft 9 in)
- Position: Attacking midfielder

Youth career
- Valencia

Senior career*
Years	Team	Apps	(Gls)
1997–2001	Valencia B	133	(50)
1999–2002	Valencia	3	(0)
2000	→ Numancia (loan)	0	(0)
2002–2005	Celta	51	(14)
2003	→ Albacete (loan)	21	(7)
2005–2007	Alavés	63	(3)
2007–2009	Gimnàstic	67	(12)
2009–2010	Elche	9	(3)
2010–2015	Girona	168	(36)
2015	Huracán	18	(2)
2016	Cádiz	15	(1)
2016–2017	Olímpic Xàtiva	34	(9)
2017–2019	La Nucía	70	(6)
Total		652	(143)

International career
1998	Spain U18	1	(1)
1998	Spain U20	3	(0)

Managerial career
- 2021–2022: Acero
- 2022–2023: Villarreal C
- 2023–2024: Amorebieta
- 2024–2025: Cartagena
- 2026: Cultural Leonesa
- * Club domestic league appearances and goals

Alejandro Castro Fernández (born 27 February 1979), known as Jandro, is a Spanish former professional footballer who played as an attacking midfielder. He is currently a manager.

He appeared in 331 Segunda División matches over 11 seasons, scoring a total of 73 goals for Celta, Albacete, Alavés, Gimnàstic, Elche and Girona. In La Liga, other than the first and the third clubs, he also played with Valencia.

== Playing career ==
Jandro was born in Mieres, Asturias. A product of Valencia CF's youth system, he played three times for the first team in a three-year span (with a stint at CD Numancia in between, where he did not appear). Subsequently, he had another La Liga spell with RC Celta de Vigo, featuring sparingly over two seasons and also serving a loan.

After helping Celta regain their top-flight status in 2005, scoring 12 league goals, Jandro moved to Deportivo Alavés also of the top division, being immediately relegated. He signed with Gimnàstic de Tarragona in summer 2007 and, after two Segunda División seasons with the Catalans as first choice, continued in that tier as he joined Elche CF on a two-year contract.

On 11 March 2010, after appearing rarely for the club – but netting three times – Jandro was released by mutual consent. In late July he signed with another side in division two, Girona FC, and scored 11 goals while playing all 42 games (38 starts, nearly 3,500 minutes of action) in his first season, with his team eventually ranking 11th.

On 25 August 2012, Jandro was named Player of the match as Girona won 5–1 away against CD Guadalajara, scoring once and providing two assists.

== Coaching career ==
On 6 July 2021, Jandro was named manager of Tercera División RFEF side CD Acero. The following 18 May, after narrowly missing out on promotion in the play-offs, he left.

In June 2022, Jandro was appointed at Villarreal CF's C team also in the fifth tier. He agreed to have his contract terminated on 13 December 2023, in order to take over second-division SD Amorebieta. On his professional debut four days later, his side drew 1–1 at home against Real Zaragoza.

Jandro left Amorebieta on 5 June 2024, after suffering relegation. On 25 September, he replaced Abelardo Fernández at the helm of FC Cartagena in the same league, being dismissed the following 12 January.

On 3 June 2026, Jandro became head coach of Cultural y Deportiva Leonesa, recently relegated to Primera Federación. On 8 November, with the club in the 14th position, he was sacked.

== Managerial statistics ==
As of 9 November 2026

Managerial record by team and tenure
Team	Nat	From	To	Record								Ref
Team	Nat	From	To	G	W	D	L	GF	GA	GD	Win %	Ref
Acero	(Spain)	6 July 2021	18 May 2022	37	18	8	11	36	29	+7	48.65	
Villarreal C	(Spain)	16 June 2022	13 December 2023	43	14	11	18	50	56	−6	32.56	
Amorebieta	(Spain)	13 December 2023	5 June 2024	24	8	7	9	23	29	−6	33.33	
Cartagena	(Spain)	25 September 2024	12 January 2025	19	5	3	11	13	28	−15	26.32	
Cultural Leonesa	(Spain)	3 June 2026	8 November 2026	12	4	4	4	12	11	+1	33.33	
Total				135	49	33	53	134	153	−19	36.30	—
