= Fernando Baiano =

Brazilian footballer (born 1979)

Personal information
- Full name: João Fernando Nelo
- Date of birth: 18 March 1979 (age 47)
- Place of birth: São Paulo, Brazil
- Height: 1.84 m (6 ft 0 in)
- Position: Striker

Senior career*
| Years | Team | Apps | (Gls) |
| 1999–2001 | Corinthians | 63 | (19) |
| 2002 | Internacional | 27 | (14) |
| 2003 | Flamengo | 41 | (16) |
| 2003–2004 | VfL Wolfsburg | 22 | (11) |
| 2004 | São Caetano | 14 | (6) |
| 2005 | Málaga | 17 | (9) |
| 2005–2007 | Celta | 68 | (28) |
| 2007–2009 | Murcia | 27 | (5) |
| 2008–2009 | → Al-Jazira (loan) | 20 | (25) |
| 2009–2012 | Al-Wahda | 49 | (34) |
| 2013 | São Bernardo | 19 | (10) |
| 2013 | Ittihad | 5 | (1) |
| 2014 | Mogi Mirim | 7 | (1) |

International career
| 1999 | Brazil U20 | 5 | (3) |
- * Club domestic league appearances and goals

João Fernando Nelo (born 18 March 1979), commonly known as Fernando Baiano, is a Brazilian former footballer who played as a striker. He is married to Bruna Lopes since 2011.

== Football career ==
After five successful years in his native Brazil with Corinthians, Internacional and Flamengo, Baiano moved abroad, joining Bundesliga's VfL Wolfsburg and scoring 11 league goals in his sole season, upon which he returned to his country with São Caetano.

In January 2005, Baiano signed for La Liga side Málaga CF, netting on nine occasions to help the Andalusia team reach a mid-table final place. During that summer, he left for Celta de Vigo: during his spell in Galicia, the club would participate in the UEFA Cup but also be relegated to Segunda División, with the player contributing with 32 goals in 80 official appearances in the process.

Upon Celta's relegation, Baiano agreed to a three-year contract with Real Murcia, for approximately €5 million. After just five league goals during the 2007–08 campaign his team finished second from the bottom, with the subsequent relegation.

In August 2008, Baiano was loaned to Al Jazira Club, in the United Arab Emirates. In June of the following year he moved to another side in the city, Al-Wahda SCC, penning a two-year contract for €5million – the player originally requested a three-year deal for €9m.

== Honors ==
Corinthians

- Campeonato Brasileiro Série A: 1999
- FIFA Club World Cup: 2000
- Campeonato Paulista: 2001

Internacional

- Campeonato Gaúcho: 2002

São Caetano

- Campeonato Paulista: 2004

Celta Vigo

- Regional Government of Galicia Cup: 2006

Al Wahda

- UAE Pro League: 2009–10
- UAE Super Cup: 2011

São Bernardo

- Copa Paulista: 2013

Individual

- UAE Pro League top scorer: 2008–09
