= Fernando Vázquez =

Spanish footballer and manager

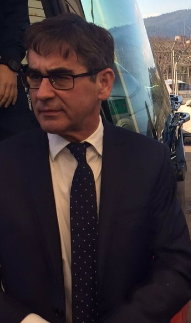

Personal information
- Full name: Fernando Vázquez Pena
- Date of birth: 24 October 1954 (age 72)
- Place of birth: Castrofeito, Spain
- Position: Midfielder

Senior career*
Years	Team	Apps	(Gls)
- Arzún
- Negreira
- Sporting Lampón
1978–1982	Loixo		
1982–1986	Camporrapado		

Managerial career
- 1978–1982: Loixo (player-manager)
- 1982–1986: Camporrapado (player-manager)
- 1986–1991: Lalín
- 1991–1993: Racing Ferrol
- 1994–1995: Lugo
- 1995–1998: Compostela
- 1998–1999: Oviedo
- 1999–2000: Mallorca
- 2000–2001: Betis
- 2001–2002: Las Palmas
- 2002–2003: Rayo Vallecano
- 2003–2004: Valladolid
- 2004–2007: Celta
- 2005–2013: Galicia
- 2013–2014: Deportivo La Coruña
- 2016: Mallorca
- 2019–2021: Deportivo La Coruña
- * Club domestic league appearances and goals

Fernando Vázquez Pena (born 24 October 1954) is a Spanish retired footballer who played as a central midfielder, currently a manager.

== Managerial career ==
Born in the village of Castrofeito, O Pino, Galicia, Vázquez was an English teacher in Lalín where he began to get involved with the school's athletics, especially football.

He started his senior coaching career with modest Lalín in 1986, but left for higher-profile Racing Ferrol in 1991.

Vázquez took charge of various clubs from 1994 to 2004, most of them in La Liga. With Celta, he achieved promotion followed by straight qualification for the UEFA Cup, after a sixth place in the 2005–06 season.

Vázquez was relieved of his duties as manager of Celta on 9 April 2007, on the eve of the Galician derby against Deportivo La Coruña, with his side embroiled deep in a relegation fight which it eventually lost on the last matchday.

Aside from coaching, Vázquez also worked as a pundit for Canal+ in their UEFA Champions League coverage. While still at Celta, he took charge of the Galicia autonomous team together with Arsenio Iglesias, longtime Depor manager.

On 11 February 2013, after nearly six years away from club duty, Vázquez was appointed at Deportivo, taking Domingos Paciência's place as the third manager of the campaign; they ultimately finished in 20th and last position. They eventually finished one place up, but still dropped down to Segunda División.

Vázquez remained at the helm in an immediate promotion after finishing as runners-up and, on 1 June 2014, he renewed his contract until 2016. However, in July, after some statements in which he criticised the club's signing policy, he was relieved of his duties.

On 19 January 2016, after nearly 18 months of inactivity, Vázquez was appointed Mallorca manager. Seriously threatened with relegation, he managed to avoid the drop in the last matchday.

Vázquez was sacked on 6 December 2016, after only one win in six matches. On 29 December 2019, after more than three years away from management, he returned to Deportivo for a second stint, replacing the dismissed Luis César Sampedro.

== Managerial statistics ==
As of match played 10 January 2021

Managerial record by team and tenure
Team	Nat	From	To	Record								Ref
Team	Nat	From	To	G	W	D	L	GF	GA	GD	Win %	Ref
Lalín	(Spain)	28 May 1986	30 June 1991	208	87	55	66	269	208	+61	41.83	
Racing Ferrol	(Spain)	30 June 1991	22 November 1993	110	51	27	32	200	120	+80	46.36	
Lugo	(Spain)	16 May 1994	23 May 1995	44	17	9	18	61	66	−5	38.64	
Compostela	(Spain)	20 June 1995	1 March 1998	127	41	35	51	149	181	−32	32.28	
Oviedo	(Spain)	19 June 1998	22 June 1999	40	11	12	17	42	61	−19	27.50	
Mallorca	(Spain)	6 September 1999	27 May 2000	48	20	11	17	70	55	+15	41.67	
Betis	(Spain)	10 June 2000	19 March 2001	30	13	10	7	29	22	+7	43.33	
Las Palmas	(Spain)	29 June 2001	31 May 2002	40	10	13	17	42	52	−10	25.00	
Rayo Vallecano	(Spain)	31 May 2002	21 January 2003	19	5	3	11	19	28	−9	26.32	
Valladolid	(Spain)	27 June 2003	27 April 2004	38	11	12	15	46	53	−7	28.95	
Celta	(Spain)	8 June 2004	9 April 2007	126	54	29	43	147	130	+17	42.86	
Galicia	(Spain)	30 June 2005	11 February 2013	8	6	2	0	28	12	+16	75.00	
Deportivo La Coruña	(Spain)	11 February 2013	8 July 2014	59	24	17	18	70	59	+11	40.68	
Mallorca	(Spain)	18 January 2016	6 December 2016	40	13	12	15	42	43	−1	32.50	
Deportivo La Coruña	(Spain)	29 December 2019	11 January 2021	33	15	10	8	35	32	+3	45.45	
Career Total				970	378	257	335	1,249	1,122	+127	38.97	—
