= Jesús Perera =

Spanish footballer

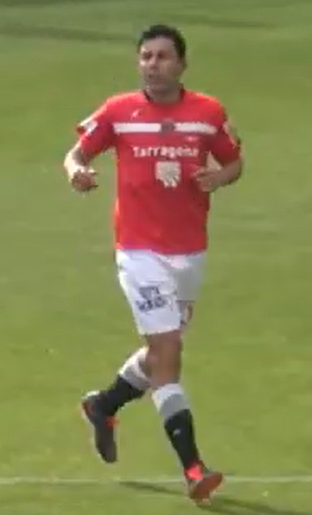
- Perera with Gimnàstic in 2013

Personal information
- Full name: José Jesús Perera López
- Date of birth: 12 April 1980 (age 46)
- Place of birth: Olivenza, Spain
- Height: 1.76 m (5 ft 9 in)
- Position: Striker

Youth career
- Badajoz

Senior career*
| Years | Team | Apps | (Gls) |
| 1998–2001 | Mallorca B | 77 | (22) |
| 2001–2003 | Albacete | 73 | (29) |
| 2003–2005 | Mallorca | 32 | (7) |
| 2005–2008 | Celta | 81 | (26) |
| 2008–2010 | Rayo Vallecano | 15 | (3) |
| 2009–2010 | → Elche (loan) | 19 | (5) |
| 2010–2011 | Elche | 23 | (2) |
| 2011–2012 | Atlético Baleares | 50 | (28) |
| 2013–2014 | Gimnàstic | 47 | (11) |
| 2014–2016 | Mérida | 41 | (24) |
| Total | | 458 | (157) |
- * Club domestic league appearances and goals

José Jesús Perera López (born 12 April 1980) is a Spanish former professional footballer who played as a striker.

He played 186 Segunda División games over eight seasons, totalling 60 goals for Mallorca B, Albacete, Celta, Rayo Vallecano and Elche. He added in 66 matches and 12 goals in La Liga, in an 18-year senior career.

== Club career ==
Perera was born in Olivenza, Province of Badajoz. A prolific scorer in the Segunda División, notably scoring 22 league goals for Albacete Balompié in the 2002–03 season, he struggled to maintain the same rate in the top division in his four La Liga campaigns (two with both RCD Mallorca and RC Celta de Vigo). His best input came in 2003–04, as he netted six times for the Balearic Islands club.

In 2007–08, Perera scored 14 goals for a Galician squad that failed to return to the top flight. He would immediately change teams again, joining Rayo Vallecano. Rarely used during the campaign, he was loaned in July 2009 two another side in that league, Elche CF, in a season-long move; the deal was made permanent in August 2010.

In July 2011, Perera signed for CD Atlético Baleares of Segunda División B. In his only full season he netted 23 goals in 32 matches, but his team failed to promote.

Perera joined fellow third-tier Gimnàstic de Tarragona in January 2013. After one and a half years in Catalonia, he left as his contract expired.

On 29 August 2014, Perera agreed to a deal at Mérida AD in the Tercera División. He was top scorer with 23 goals in his first season as they won promotion, but retired at the age of 36 at the conclusion of the following campaign, in which he was troubled by a knee injury.

== Honours ==
Individual

- Pichichi Trophy (Segunda División): 2002–03
