= Fabián Canobbio =

Uruguayan footballer (born 1980)

Personal information
- Full name: Néstor Fabián Canobbio Bentaberry
- Date of birth: 8 March 1980 (age 46)
- Place of birth: Montevideo, Uruguay
- Height: 1.79 m (5 ft 10 in)
- Position: Attacking midfielder

Senior career*
Years	Team	Apps	(Gls)
1997–2000	Progreso		
2001–2003	Peñarol	73	(26)
2003–2005	Valencia	11	(1)
2004–2005	→ Celta (loan)	38	(12)
2005–2008	Celta	93	(17)
2008–2010	Valladolid	53	(5)
2010–2011	AEL	18	(3)
2011	Fénix	5	(0)
2012	Progreso	13	(4)
2013–2015	Danubio	21	(4)
Total		325	(72)

International career
1999	Uruguay U20	4	(1)
2001–2007	Uruguay	9	(0)
- * Club domestic league appearances and goals

Néstor Fabián Canobbio Bentaberry (born 8 March 1980) is a Uruguayan former professional footballer who played as an attacking midfielder.

A skilled midfielder with netting ability, he spent most of his career in Spain, having played 225 competitive matches for three clubs.

== Club career ==
Born in Montevideo, Canobbio began his career with Progreso in 1997. In three seasons there, he was impressive enough to be signed by country giants Peñarol in 2001, where he spent two campaigns scoring more than 30 official goals while helping the capital side to the Primera División title in 2003.

Canobbio was acquired by Rafael Benítez's Valencia in late July 2003, where he featured mainly as a substitute; the manager had not asked for the player to be signed, and famously commented that he had been waiting for a sofa and had been brought a lamp instead. Having scored just once throughout the season, in a 2–2 home draw with Celta de Vigo, he nonetheless managed to make ten appearances in the team's 2004 UEFA Cup conquest, netting once in the 3–2 win against Beşiktaş.

For 2004–05, Canobbio joined recently relegated Celta on loan, with the Galician club having the option to buy at the end of the season, which was activated as he finished as the team's joint-top scorer at 12 (with Jandro) and a La Liga promotion befell.

After three additional campaigns as an important attacking player, scoring seven goals in 2007–08 as Celta failed to return to the top flight, Canobbio was released in July 2008, subsequently joining Real Valladolid. In November, he netted in home victories over Sevilla (3–2, two goals) and Real Madrid (1–0), and appeared regularly in his two-year spell, being relegated in 2010.

On 26 July 2010, the 30-year-old Canobbio moved to Greece, signing a one-year contract with Athlitiki Enosi Larissa. Having retired in 2015, he became Progreso's chairman two years later; under his tenure, the club returned to the top tier in the 2018 season, qualifying for the Copa Libertadores in 2020 and putting an end to a 30-year absence in the competition.

== International career ==
A Uruguayan international since 7 October 2001, in a 2002 FIFA World Cup qualifier against Colombia, Canobbio went on to represent the nation at the 2007 Copa América, playing two matches for the semi-finalists. Previously, he appeared with the under-20s at the 1999 FIFA World Youth Championship, a fourth-place finish in Nigeria.

== Personal life ==
Canobbio's younger brother, Carlos, was also a footballer. A defender, he also played in Spain but only in amateur football, and they shared teams at Progreso.

== Honours ==
Peñarol

- Uruguayan Primera División: 2003

Valencia

- La Liga: 2003–04
- UEFA Cup: 2003–04

Danubio

- Uruguayan Primera División: 2013–14
