= Ángel López (footballer, born 1981) =

Spanish footballer

Ángel
Personal information
- Full name: Ángel Domingo López Ruano
- Date of birth: 10 March 1981 (age 45)
- Place of birth: Las Palmas, Spain
- Height: 1.80 m (5 ft 11 in)
- Positions: Right-back; midfielder

Youth career
- Las Palmas

Senior career*
Years	Team	Apps	(Gls)
1998–2000	Las Palmas B		
2000–2003	Las Palmas	81	(1)
2003–2007	Celta	159	(6)
2007–2012	Villarreal	104	(2)
2012–2013	Betis	11	(1)
2013–2016	Las Palmas	71	(2)
Total		426	(12)

International career
2001–2003	Spain U21	14	(0)
2006–2008	Spain	5	(0)
- * Club domestic league appearances and goals

Ángel Domingo López Ruano, known simply as Ángel (Spanish pronunciation: [ˈaŋxel ˈlopeθ]; born 10 March 1981), is a Spanish former professional footballer. An attacking right-back, he could also play as a right midfielder.

== Club career ==
Ángel was born in Las Palmas, Canary Islands. After first appearing professionally with hometown's UD Las Palmas, playing 64 La Liga games from 2000 to 2002, he made a name for himself as a stamina-filled wingback at fellow top-division club RC Celta de Vigo, signing with the Galicians in the 2003 January transfer window. He appeared in 15 league matches in the second part of the season as the team qualified for the UEFA Champions League for the first time ever; however, also with the player as first-choice, they would be relegated at the end of the 2003–04 campaign.

On the last day of 2007–08's summer transfer deadline, Ángel joined Villarreal CF. In a season where the side dubbed the Yellow Submarine achieved a best-ever runner-up league position, he split right-back duties with veteran Javi Venta, a situation which again befell the following campaign (22 matches for Venta, 21 for López).

In 2009–10, Ángel again battled with Venta for first-choice status. He scored his first goal for Villarreal on 4 April 2010, shooting from 30 yards to open the score at Real Valladolid in an eventual 2–0 win.

After Venta's departure to Levante UD, Ángel was the undisputed right-back. On 9 January 2011, during a 4–2 away loss against Real Madrid, he suffered a severe injury in his left knee – anterior cruciate ligament – being sidelined for the next six months.

== International career ==
Ángel won his first cap for the Spain national team in a 1–0 friendly defeat with Romania in Cádiz, on 15 November 2006.
