= 1993–94 Valencia CF season =

Valencia CF 1993–94 football season

Valencia CF
1993–94 season
- President: Arturo Tuzón (until 24 November 1993); José Domingo and Melchor Hoyos Pérez (interim until 9 March 1994); Francisco Roig
- Head Coach: Guus Hiddink (until 12 November 1993); Paco Real (until 20 December 1993); Héctor Nuñez (until 5 March 1994); José Manuel Rielo (until 21 March 1994); Guus Hiddink
- Stadium: Luis Casanova
- La Liga: 7th
- Copa del Rey: Round of 16
- UEFA Cup: Round of 32
- Top goalscorer: Peđa Mijatović (16)
Home colours	Away colours	Third colours

In the 1993–94 football season, Valencia CF failed to qualify for European competition as it ended 7th in La Liga and wasn't able to reach the quarterfinals in neither the Copa del Rey nor the UEFA Cup. The campaign was marked by the latter's 7–0 exit in Karlsruhe, the worst loss suffered by a Spanish team in European competition, and included the resignation of chairman Arturo Tuzón and the sacking of manager Guus Hiddink. However, Hiddink was eventually reinstated before the season was over after his own successor, Héctor Núñez, was also fired.

== Squad ==
Note: Flags indicate national team as defined under FIFA eligibility rules; some limited exceptions apply. Players may hold more than one non-FIFA nationality.

No.	Pos.	Nation	Player
—	GK	ESP	José Manuel Sempere
—	DF	ESP	Quique Sánchez Flores
—	DF	ROU	Miodrag Belodedici
—	DF	ESP	Paco Camarasa
—	DF	ESP	Fernando Giner
—	DF	ESP	Pepe Serer
—	MF	ESP	Fernando Gómez Colomer
—	MF	ESP	Carlos Arroyo Ayala
—	MF	ESP	Tomás González Rivera
—	FW	YUG	Predrag Mijatović
—	FW	ESP	Álvaro Cervera
—	GK	ESP	José Luis Gonzalez
—	MF	ESP	Gaizka Mendieta
—	FW	ESP	Pepe Gálvez

No.	Pos.	Nation	Player
—	FW	ARG	Juan Antonio Pizzi
—	FW	BUL	Lyuboslav Penev
—	FW	ESP	Eloy Olaya
—	MF	ESP	Ignacio Ibáñez
—	FW	COL	Víctor Aristizábal
—	DF	ESP	José Manuel Tárraga
—	DF	ESP	Matías Rubio Navarro
—	MF	ESP	Alvaro Benito
—	MF	ESP	Robert Fernandez
—	DF	ESP	García Toral
—	DF	ESP	Fran Figueroa
—	DF	ESP	Javi Navarro
—	DF	ESP	Sergio Pellicer
—	MF	ESP	Aquilino Etxarri
—	FW	ESP	Diego Ribera
—	GK	ESP	Francisco Molina
—	GK	ESP	Antonio Notario

=== Transfers ===
In
Pos.	Name	from	Type
FW	Predrag Mijatovic	FK Partizan	
DF	José Pérez Serer	RCD Mallorca	
FW	Juan Antonio Pizzi	CD Tenerife	loan
FW	Víctor Aristizábal	Atletico Nacional	
FW	José Gálvez Estévez	RCD Mallorca	
GK	Antonio Notario	Granada CF	

Out
Pos.	Name	To	Type
DF	Leonardo	São Paulo FC	
FW	Juan Sánchez	RCD Mallorca	
GK	José Francisco Molina	Villarreal CF	loan
DF	Voro	Deportivo La Coruña	
MF	Toni		

== Competitions ==
=== La Liga ===
==== League table ====
Pos	Team	Pld	W	D	L	GF	GA	GD	Pts	Qualification or relegation
5	Athletic Bilbao	38	16	11	11	61	47	+14	43	Qualification for the UEFA Cup first round
6	Sevilla	38	15	12	11	56	42	+14	42	
7	Valencia	38	14	12	12	55	50	+5	40	
8	Racing Santander	38	15	8	15	44	42	+2	38	
9	Oviedo	38	12	13	13	43	49	−6	37	

Source: LFP
Rules for classification: 1) points; 2) head-to-head points; 3) head-to-head goal difference; 4) head-to-head goals scored; 5) goal difference; 6) number of goals scored.

==== Results by round ====
Round	1	2	3	4	5	6	7	8	9	10	11	12	13	14	15	16	17	18	19	20	21	22	23	24	25	26	27	28	29	30	31	32	33	34	35	36	37	38
Ground	H	A	H	A	H	A	H	A	H	A	A	H	A	H	A	H	A	H	A	A	H	A	H	A	H	A	H	A	H	H	A	H	A	H	A	H	A	H
Result	W	D	W	W	D	W	L	W	W	L	L	W	D	L	L	L	D	D	L	D	L	W	L	D	D	W	L	W	W	L	D	D	W	L	W	D	W	D
Position	3	3	2	1	3	2	2	2	1	4	6	6	4	6	7	9	9	10	11	12	14	13	14	12	13	11	12	12	9	10	9	10	7	7	7	7	7	7

Source: https://www.bdfutbol.com/en/t/t1992-9339.html?tab=partits
A = Away; H = Home; W = Win; D = Draw; L = Loss; = Leader, 1994–95 UEFA Champions League Group stage; = 1994–95 UEFA Cup First round; = 1993–94 Relegation playoff to 1994–95 Segunda Division; = 1994–95 Segunda Division; R = 1994–95 UEFA Cup Winners' Cup

==== Results ====
5 September 1993 1	Real Oviedo	0–3	Valencia CF	Oviedo
	Jerkan (red card) 17'	Report	Mijatović 22', 41'; Fernando 66'	Stadium: Carlos Tartiere; Referee: Gracia Redondo

11 September 1993 2	Valencia CF	2–2	Atlético Madrid	Valencia
	Penev 26'; Giner (red card) 47'; Mijatović 54'	Report	L. García 30'; Mori 36'; Moacir (red card) 75'	Stadium: Luis Casanova; Referee: Merino González

19 September 1993 3	Racing Santander	0–1	Valencia CF	Santander
		Report	Fernando 86'	Stadium: El Sardinero; Referee: Urío Velázquez

25 September 1993 4	Valencia CF	3–2	CD Tenerife	Valencia
	Fernando 10', 42'; Penev 85' (pen.)	Report	Chano 82' (pen.); Felipe 89'	Stadium: Luis Casanova; Referee: Andújar Oliver

3 October 1993 5	UE Lleida	1–1	Valencia CF	Lleida
	Aguilà 26'	Report	Pizzi 25'	Stadium: Camp d'Esports; Referee: Pajares Paz

6 October 1993 6	Valencia CF	3–1	Rayo Vallecano	Valencia
	Pizzi 46'; Arroyo 52'; Olaya 89'	Report	Orejuela 44'	Stadium: Luis Casanova; Referee: Pérez Sánchez

17 October 1993 7	CD Logroñés	2–0	Valencia CF	Logroño
	Eraña 34'; Poyatos 38'	Report		Stadium: Las Gaunas; Referee: Martín Navarrete

23 October 1993 8	Valencia CF	1–0	Athletic Bilbao	Valencia
	Penev 31'	Report		Stadium: Luis Casanova; Referee: García Aranda

30 October 1993 9	Valencia CF	3–0	Celta Vigo	Valencia
	Fernando 30', 58'; Mijatović 64'	Report		Stadium: Luis Casanova; Referee: Esquinas Torres

7 November 1993 10	Sporting Gijón	2–0	Valencia CF	Gijón
	Escaich 38'; Juanele 89'	Report	Eloy (red card) 89'	Stadium: El Molinón; Referee: Brito Arceo

11 November 1993 11	Valencia CF	0–3	Real Madrid	Valencia
		Report	Alfonso 22'; Hierro 58'; Zamorano 83'	Stadium: Luis Casanova; Referee: Marín López

20 November 1993 12	Sevilla FC	0–1	Valencia CF	Sevilla
		Report	Penev 25'	Stadium: Ramón Sánchez Pizjuán; Referee: José Francisco Pérez Sánchez

28 November 1993 13	Valencia CF	0–0	Real Sociedad	Valencia
		Report		Stadium: Luis Casanova; Referee: López Nieto

5 December 1993 14	Albacete Balompié	3–1	Valencia CF	Albacete
	Antonio 36'; Menéndez 70'; Zalazar 89' (pen.)	Report	Pizzi 5'	Stadium: Carlos Belmonte; Referee: Gracia Redondo

11 December 1993 15	Valencia CF	0–4	FC Barcelona	Valencia
	Sempere (red card) 86'	Report	Stoichkov 30'; Bakero 34', 74'; Koeman 85' (pen.)	Stadium: Luis Casanova; Referee: Martín Navarrete

19 December 1993 16	Real Zaragoza	1–0	Valencia CF	Zaragoza
	Pardeza 38'	Report		Stadium: La Romareda; Referee: Núñez Manrique

2 January 1994 17	Valencia CF	0–0	CA Osasuna	Valencia
	Penev (red card) 89'	Report	De Quintana (red card) 89'	Stadium: Luis Casanova; Referee: Rubio Valdivieso

9 January 1994 18	Real Valladolid	1–1	Valencia CF	Zaragoza
	Alberto 63'	Report	Pizzi 17'	Stadium: La Romareda; Referee: Núñez Manrique

15 January 1994 19	Valencia CF	1–3	Deportivo La Coruña	Valencia
	Gálvez 51'; Camarasa (red card) 60'	Report	M. Silva 53'; Bebeto 75'; Claudio 86'	Stadium: Luis Casanova; Referee: Andújar Oliver

23 January 1994 20	Valencia CF	2–2	Real Oviedo	Valencia
	Fernando 19'; Penev 30' (pen.)	Report	Rivas (red card) 51'; Jokanović 59'; Carlos 70'	Stadium: Luis Casanova; Referee: Rivas Fernández

29 January 1994 21	Atlético Madrid	2–0	Valencia CF	Madrid
	Pedro 4' (pen.); P. Gómez 20'	Report		Stadium: Vicente Calderón; Referee: Pérez Sánchez

6 February 1994 22	Valencia CF	2–1	Racing Santander	Valencia
	Mijatović 3' (pen.), 51'	Report	Popov 27'	Stadium: Luis Casanova; Referee: García Aranda

13 February 1994 23	CD Tenerife	1–0	Valencia CF	Santa Cruz de Tenerife
	Dertycia 45'	Report		Stadium: Heliodoro Rodríguez López; Referee: Bello Blanco

20 February 1994 24	Valencia CF	3–3	UE Lleida	Valencia
	Mijatović 23', 57'; Sempere (red card) 51'; Mendieta 57'	Report	Milinković 47'; Rubio 49' (pen.); Matosas 83'	Stadium: Luis Casanova; Referee: Esquinas Torres

24 February 1994 25	Rayo Vallecano	1–1	Valencia CF	Madrid
	H. Sánchez (red card) 50'; Onésimo 76'	Report	Quique 70'	Stadium: Vallecas; Referee: López Nieto

27 February 1994 26	Valencia CF	3–1	CD Logroñés	Valencia
	Mijatović 27' (pen.), 33'; Camarasa 54'	Report	Romero 36'	Stadium: Luis Casanova; Referee: Núñez Manrique

5 March 1994 27	Athletic Bilbao	2–1	Valencia CF	Bilbao
	Larrazabal 12'; Ziganda 84'	Report	Quique 87'	Stadium: San Mamés; Referee: Díaz Vega

13 March 1994 28	Celta Vigo	1–2	Valencia CF	Vigo
	Otero 16' (red card) 84'; Ratković (red card) 85'	Report	Quique 20'; Arroyo 86'	Stadium: Balaídos; Referee: Pajares Paz

20 March 1994 29	Valencia CF	1–0	Sporting Gijón	Valencia
	Mijatović 87'	Report		Stadium: Luis Casanova; Referee: García de Loza

26 March 1994 30	Real Madrid	3–2	Valencia CF	Madrid
	Dubovský 35'; Prosinečki 47'; Butragueño 86'	Report	Mendieta 7'; Álvaro 55'	Stadium: Santiago Bernabéu; Referee: Merino González

3 April 1994 31	Valencia CF	1–1	Sevilla FC	Valencia
	Camarasa (red card) 43'; Fernando 62'	Report	Prieto (red card) 17'; Šuker 52'	Stadium: Luis Casanova; Referee: García Aranda

6 April 1994 32	Real Sociedad	0–0	Valencia CF	San Sebastián
		Report	Belodedici (red card) 31'; Serer (red card) 85'	Stadium: Anoeta; Referee: Brito Arceo

10 April 1994 33	Valencia CF	4–0	Sevilla FC	Valencia
	Fernando 15', 31', 84'; Mijatović 70' (pen.)	Report		Stadium: Luis Casanova; Referee: Santamaría Uzqueda

16 April 1994 34	FC Barcelona	3–1	Valencia CF	Barcelona
	Begiristain 7', 28'; Stoichkov 83'	Report	Fernando 59'; Tomás (red card) 71'	Stadium: Camp Nou; Referee: Rubio Valdivieso

24 April 1994 35	Valencia CF	3–0	Real Zaragoza	Valencia
	Arroyo 18' (red card) 74'; Mijatović 31' (pen.), 49' (pen.)	Report		Stadium: Luis Casanova; Referee: Merino Gonzalez

1 May 1994 36	CA Osasuna	3–3	Valencia CF	El Sadar
	Pascual 8'; Urban 39'; Ziober 81'	Report	Fernando 52'; Gálvez 73', 76'	Referee: Esquinas Torres

8 May 1994 35	Valencia CF	5–1	Real Valladolid	Valencia
	Fernando 16'; Sempere (red card) 31'; Mijatović 33', 47' (pen.); Quique 40', 78'	Report	Amavisca 72'	Stadium: Luis Casanova; Referee: Pajares Paz

14 May 1994 38	Deportivo La Coruña	0–0	Valencia CF	Riazor
		Report	Álvaro (red card) 87'	Referee: López Nieto

=== Copa del Rey ===
5 January 1994 Round of 16, L1	CD Tenerife	3–1	Valencia CF	Santa Cruz de Tenerife
	Chano 21', 41'; Latorre 91' (pen.)	Report	Mijatović 45'	Stadium: Heliodoro Rodríguez López; Referee: Díaz Vega

12 January 1994 Round of 16, L2	Valencia CF	3–2	CD Tenerife	Valencia
	Gálvez 4'; Penev 41'; Serer 89'	Report	Chano 59', 90'	Stadium: Luis Casanova; Referee: García de Loza

=== UEFA Cup ===
16 September 1993 Round of 64, L1	FC Nantes (France)	1–1	(Spain) Valencia CF	Nantes
	Ouédec 13'	Report	Mijatović 16'	Stadium: La Beaujoire; Referee: Craciunescu

30 September 1993 Round of 64, L2	Valencia CF (Spain)	3–1 (a.e.t.)	(France) FC Nantes	Valencia
	Penev 62' (pen.); Gálvez 104'; Fernando 111'	Report	Pedros 50'; Karembeu (red card) 57'	Stadium: Luis Casanova; Referee: Mottram

20 October 1993 Round of 32, L1	Valencia CF (Spain)	3–1	(Germany) Karlsruher SC	Valencia
	Mijatović 35'; Penev 47', 72'	Report	Kiryakov 77'	Stadium: Luis Casanova; Referee: Leduc

2 November 1993 Round of 32, L2	Karlsruher SC (Germany)	7–0	(Spain) Valencia CF	Karlsruhe
	Schmitt 29', 34', 52', 63'; Schütterle 37'; Shmarov 46'; Bilić 88'	Report		Stadium: Wildparkstadion; Referee: Przesmycki

== Statistics ==
=== Players statistics ===
No.	Pos	Nat	Player	Total		La Liga		Copa del Rey		UEFA	
No.	Pos	Nat	Player	Apps	Goals	Apps	Goals	Apps	Goals	Apps	Goals
	GK	(Spain) ESP	José Manuel Sempere	35	-51	31	-41	0	0	4	-10
	DF	(Spain) ESP	Quique Sánchez Flores	34	5	30	5	2	0	2	0
	DF	(Romania) ROU	Miodrag Belodedici	35	0	28+1	0	2	0	4	0
	DF	(Spain) ESP	Paco Camarasa	37	1	35	1	2	0		
	DF	(Spain) ESP	Fernando Giner	35	0	29	0	2	0	4	0
	DF	(Spain) ESP	Pepe Serer	35	1	29+1	0	1	1	4	0
	MF	(Spain) ESP	Fernando Gómez	36	15	28+2	14	2	0	4	1
	MF	(Spain) ESP	Carlos Arroyo	32	3	22+6	3	1+1	0	2	0
	MF	(Spain) ESP	Tomas González	31	0	20+7	0	0+1	0	3	0
	FW	(Federal Republic of Yugoslavia) YUG	Predrag Mijatović	41	19	34+1	16	2	1	4	2
	FW	(Spain) ESP	Álvaro Cervera	29	1	18+7	1	0	0	3+1	0
	GK	(Spain) ESP	González	11	-14	7+2	-9	2	-5		
	MF	(Spain) ESP	Gaizka Mendieta	20	2	20	2	0	0		
	FW	(Bulgaria) BUL	Lubo Penev	20	9	16	5	1	1	3	3
	FW	(Spain) ESP	Eloy Olaya	22	1	14+2	1	2	0	0+4	0
	FW	(Argentina) ARG	Juan Antonio Pizzi	21	4	13+6	4	1	0	1	0
	FW	(Spain) ESP	Pepe Gálvez	33	5	11+17	3	1+1	1	1+2	1
	MF	(Spain) ESP	Ignacio Ibáñez	11	0	8+2	0	0+1	0		
	FW	(Colombia) COL	Víctor Aristizábal	7	0	7	0				
	DF	(Spain) ESP	José Manuel Tárraga	5	0	5	0				
	DF	(Spain) ESP	Matías Rubio Navarro	5	0	4	0	1	0		
	MF	(Spain) ESP	Benito	5	0	4+1	0				
	MF	(Spain) ESP	Robert Fernández	7	0	3+3	0	0	0	1	0
	FW	(Spain) ESP	Diego Ribera	6	0	1+5	0				
	DF	(Spain) ESP	Garcia Toral	2	0	1+1	0				
	DF	(Spain) ESP	Fran	1	0	0+1	0				
	DF	(Spain) ESP	Javi Navarro	4	0	0+4	0				
	DF	(Spain) ESP	Sergio Pellicer	0	0	0	0				
	MF	(Spain) ESP	Aquilino Etxarri	1	0	0+1	0				
	GK	(Spain) ESP	José Francisco Molina	0	0	0	0				
	GK	(Spain) ESP	Antonio Notario	0	0	0	0				

- Source: https://www.bdfutbol.com/es/t/t1993-9436.html

== Chronology ==
=== July ===
- Thursday, 1 — Hiddink denies knowing about Barcelona's alleged interest in Fernando but say they would listen an interesting offer.
