= 1994–95 Valencia CF season =

Valencia CF
1994–95 season
- President: Francisco Roig
- Head Coach: Carlos Alberto Parreira (until 27 May 1995); José Manuel Rielo
- Stadium: Luis Casanova (until 1 November 1994); Mestalla
- La Liga: 10th
- Copa del Rey: Runners-up
- Top goalscorer: League: Peđa Mijatović (12); All: Lyuboslav Penev (16)
Home colours	Away colours

During the 1994–95 season Valencia CF competed in La Liga and Copa del Rey

== Summary ==
During summer new president Francisco Roig appointed Brazilian and recently 1994 FIFA World Cup Champion Carlos Alberto Parreira as new manager. Also, the club transferred in several players such as Russian striker Oleg Salenko, Vicente Engonga, 1994 FIFA World Cup Winner Mazinho from Palmeiras also from FC Barcelona arrived International Goalkeeper Andoni Zubizarreta and defender Juan Carlos Rodríguez. The team collapsed in League to the 10th spot never placing in European classification zone and Parreira left the club before the end of the season. Meanwhile, with Rielo as new manager in Copa del Rey the squad reached the Final for the first time since 1979 being defeated by Deportivo La Coruña with a 1–2 score.

== Squad ==
Note: Flags indicate national team as defined under FIFA eligibility rules; some limited exceptions apply. Players may hold more than one non-FIFA nationality.

No.	Pos.	Nation	Player
—	GK	ESP	Andoni Zubizarreta
—	DF	ESP	Jorge Otero
—	DF	ESP	Enrique Romero
—	DF	ESP	Paco Camarasa (Captain)
—	DF	ESP	Fernando Giner
—	DF	ESP	Pepe Serer
—	MF	ESP	Fernando Gómez Colomer
—	MF	ESP	Carlos Arroyo
—	MF	BRA	Mazinho
—	FW	YUG	Predrag Mijatović
—	DF	ESP	Juan José Maqueda
—	GK	ESP	Jorge Bartual

No.	Pos.	Nation	Player
—	FW	ESP	Álvaro Cervera
—	GK	ESP	José Manuel Sempere
—	MF	ESP	Gaizka Mendieta
—	FW	ESP	Pepe Gálvez
—	FW	RUS	Oleg Salenko
—	FW	BUL	Lyuboslav Penev
—	FW	ESP	Eloy Olaya
—	MF	ESP	Vicente Engonga
—	FW	ESP	Raúl Ibañez
—	DF	ESP	Juan Carlos
—	MF	ESP	Robert Fernández
—	DF	ESP	Fran Figueroa
—	DF	ESP	Javi Navarro

=== Transfers ===
In
Pos.	Name	from	Type
GK	Andoni Zubizarreta	FC Barcelona	free
DF	Jorge Otero	Celta Vigo	
DF	Enrique Romero	CD Logroñés	
MF	Mazinho	Palmeiras	
MF	Antonio Poyatos	CD Logroñés	
FW	Oleg Salenko	CD Logroñés	
DF	Juan Carlos	FC Barcelona	
MF	Vicente Engonga	Celta Vigo	
DF	Juan José Maqueda	Real Madrid B	
DF	Jorge Bartual	Valencia B	

Out
Pos.	Name	To	Type
DF	Quique Sánchez Flores	Real Madrid	
DF	Miodrag Belodedici	Real Valladolid	
FW	Juan Antonio Pizzi	CD Tenerife	
FW	Víctor Aristizábal		
GK	José Francisco Molina	Albacete Balompié	loan
GK	Antonio Notario	Real Murcia	
MF	Aquilino Etxarri	Hércules CF	
DF	García Toral	CD Castellón	
MF	Alvaro Benito	Toledo	
DF	Matías Rubio Navarro	Lleida	

== Competitions ==
=== La Liga ===
==== League table ====
Pos	Team	Pld	W	D	L	GF	GA	GD	Pts
8	Athletic Bilbao	38	16	10	12	39	42	−3	42
9	Oviedo	38	13	13	12	45	42	+3	39
10	Valencia	38	13	12	13	53	48	+5	38 (Note: RSO 0–2 VAL; VAL 4–2 RSO)
11	Real Sociedad	38	12	14	12	56	44	+12	38
12	Racing Santander	38	13	10	15	42	47	−5	36 (Note: CEL 2–1 RAC; RAC 2–0 CEL)

Source: LFP
Rules for classification: 1) points; 2) head-to-head points; 3) head-to-head goal difference; 4) head-to-head goals scored; 5) goal difference; 6) number of goals scored.

==== Position by round ====
Round	1	2	3	4	5	6	7	8	9	10	11	12	13	14	15	16	17	18	19	20	21	22	23	24	25	26	27	28	29	30	31	32	33	34	35	36	37	38
Ground	A	H	H	A	H	A	H	A	H	A	H	A	H	A	H	A	H	A	H	H	A	A	H	A	H	A	H	A	H	A	H	A	H	A	H	A	H	A
Result	W	L	W	W	W	L	L	L	W	D	L	D	D	L	D	L	D	D	W	D	D	W	W	L	W	D	L	D	W	L	W	L	W	L	D	L	W	D
Position	3	7	5	4	2	5	8	10	9	9	10	10	11	11	11	13	13	13	11	11	11	11	9	12	9	9	11	11	9	11	9	10	10	10	11	11	11	10

Source: Competitive matches
A = Away; H = Home; W = Win; D = Draw; L = Loss; = Leader, 1995–96 UEFA Champions League Group stage; = 1995–96 UEFA Cup First round; R = 1995–96 UEFA Cup Winners' Cup

==== Matches ====
4 September 1994 1	Atlético Madrid	2-4	Valencia CF	Madrid
		Report		Stadium: Vicente Calderón

11 September 1994 2	Valencia	0-1	Sevilla CF	Valencia
		Report		Stadium: Luis Casanova

17 September 1994 3	Valencia	2-1	CD Tenerife	Valencia
				Stadium: Luis Casanova

25 September 1994 4	Real Sociedad	0-2	Valencia CF	San Sebastián
		Report		Stadium: Anoeta

1 October 1994 5	Valencia CF	1-0	Real Oviedo	Valencia
		Report		Stadium: Luis Casanova

9 October 1994 6	Real Valladolid	2-0	Valencia CF	Valladolid
		Report		Stadium: José Zorrilla

15 October 1994 7	Valencia CF	1-2	FC Barcelona	Valencia
		Report		Stadium: Luis Casanova

23 October 1994 8	Deportivo La Coruña	3-1	Valencia CF	A Coruña
		Report		Stadium: Riazor

29 October 1994 9	Valencia CF	1-0	Celta Vigo	Valencia
		Report		Stadium: Luis Casanova

6 November 1994 10	Real Betis	1-1	Valencia CF	Seville
		Report		Stadium: Benito Villamarín

19 November 1994 11	Valencia CF	1-2	Real Madrid	Valencia
		Report		Stadium: Mestalla

27 November 1994 12	CD Logroñés	2-2	Valencia CF	Logroño
				Stadium: Las Gaunas

3 December 1994 13	Valencia CF	3-3	Albacete Balompié	Valencia
		Report		Stadium: Mestalla

10 December 1994	Athletic Bilbao	2-1	Valencia CF	Bilbao
		Report		Stadium: San Mamés

21 December 1994 15	Racing Santander	3-2	Valencia CF	Santander
		Report		Stadium: El Sardinero

15 January 1995	Valencia CF	0-0	Español	Valencia
		Report		Stadium: Mestalla

22 January 1995 18	SD Compostela	1-1	Valencia CF	Santiago de Compostela
				Stadium: San Lázaro

29 January 1995 19	Valencia CF	3-0	Real Zaragoza	Valencia
		Report		Stadium: Mestalla

5 February 1995 20	Valencia CF	0-0	Atlético Madrid	Valencia
		Report		Stadium: Mestalla

12 February 1995 21	Sevilla CF	1-1	Valencia CF	Seville
		Report		Stadium: Sánchez Pizjuán

19 February 1995	CD Tenerife	1-2	Valencia CF	Santa Cruz de Tenerife
		Report		Stadium: Estadio Heliodoro Rodríguez

26 February 1995 23	Valencia CF	4-2	Real Sociedad	Valencia
		Report		Stadium: Mestalla

4 March 1995 24	Real Oviedo	1-0	Valencia CF	Oviedo
		Report		Stadium: Carlos Tartiere

12 March 1995 25	Valencia CF	3-0	Real Valladolid	Valencia
		Report		Stadium: Mestalla

19 March 1995 25	FC Barcelona	0-0	Valencia CF	Barcelona
		Report		Stadium: Camp Nou

1 April 1995 27	Valencia CF	1-2	Deportivo La Coruña	Valencia
		Report		Stadium: Mestalla

9 April 1995 28	Celta Vigo	0-0	Valencia CF	Vigo
		Report		Stadium: Balaídos

16 April 1995 29	Valencia CF	2-1	Real Betis	Valencia
		Report		Stadium: Mestalla

22 April 1995 30	Real Madrid	3-1	Valencia CF	Madrid
		Report		Stadium: Santiago Bernabéu

30 April 1995 31	Valencia CF	3-0	CD Logroñés	Valencia
		Report		Stadium: Mestalla

7 May 1995 32	Albacete Balompié	1-0	Valencia CF	Albacete
		Report		Stadium: Carlos Belmonte

13 May 1995 33	Valencia CF	3-1	Athletic Bilbao	Valencia
		Report		Stadium: Mestalla

21 May 1995 34	Sporting Gijón	1-0	Valencia CF	Gijón
		Report		Stadium: El Molinón

27 May 1995 35	Valencia CF	1-1	Racing Santander	Valencia
		Report		Stadium: Mestalla

3 June 1995 36	Español	5-0	Valencia CF	Barcelona
		Report		Stadium: Sarrià

10 June 1995 37	Valencia CF	4-1	SD Compostela	Valencia
		Report		Stadium: Mestalla

18 June 1995 38	Real Zaragoza	2-2	Valencia CF	Zaragoza
				Stadium: La Romareda

=== Copa del Rey ===
==== Round 3 ====
4 January 1995	Corralejo	2-2	Valencia CF

11 January 1995	Valencia CF	5-0	Corralejo

==== Round 4 ====
25 January 1995	UD Salamanca	2-1	Valencia CF

1 February 1995	Valencia CF	3-0	UD Salamanca

==== Eightfinals ====
9 February 1995	Real Madrid	1-2	Valencia CF

16 February 1995	Valencia CF	2-1	Real Madrid

==== Quarterfinals ====
8 March 1995	RCD Mallorca	1-0	Valencia CF

22 March 1995	Valencia CF	4-0	RCD Mallorca

==== Semifinals ====
31 May 1995	Valencia CF	1-1	Albacete Balompié

13 June 1995	Albacete Balompié	1-2	Valencia CF

==== Final ====
24 June 1995	Deportivo La Coruña	1–1 (suspended)	Valencia CF	Madrid
21:00 CEST	Manjarín 35'	Report	70' Mijatović	Stadium: Santiago Bernabéu; Attendance: 95,000; Referee: José María García-Aranda
Note: Match suspended at 79' due to heavy rain condition.

===== Rematch =====
27 June 1995	Deportivo La Coruña	2–1	Valencia	Madrid
20:30 CEST	35' Manjarín; 81' Alfredo		70' Mijatović	Stadium: Santiago Bernabéu Stadium; Attendance: 81,000; Referee: José María García-Aranda
Note: Match rescheduled from 24 June 1995, both teams disputed just the 11 minutes pending to play.

== Statistics ==
=== Players statistics ===
No.	Pos	Nat	Player	Total		La Liga		Copa del Rey	
No.	Pos	Nat	Player	Apps	Goals	Apps	Goals	Apps	Goals
	GK	(Spain) ESP	Andoni Zubizarreta	48	-57	38	-48	10	-9
	DF	(Spain) ESP	Jorge Otero	31	0	25	0	6	0
	DF	(Spain) ESP	Paco Camarasa	47	1	37	0	10	1
	DF	(Spain) ESP	Fernando Giner	42	0	32	0	10	0
	DF	(Spain) ESP	Enrique Romero	39	2	28+2	2	9	0
	MF	(Spain) ESP	Fernando Gomez	47	11	37	7	10	4
	MF	(Brazil) BRA	Mazinho	41	0	31	0	10	0
	MF	(Spain) ESP	Robert Fernandez	36	5	22+6	4	6+2	1
	MF	(Spain) ESP	Antonio Poyatos	37	4	25+5	4	6+1	0
	FW	(Federal Republic of Yugoslavia) YUG	Predrag Mijatović	38	15	26+3	12	9	3
	FW	(Bulgaria) BUL	Lubo Penev	34	16	17+8	9	6+3	7
	GK	(Spain) ESP	José Manuel Sempere	1	-2	0	0	1	-2
	FW	(Spain) ESP	Álvaro Cervera	32	3	22+3	1	6+1	2
	FW	(Russia) RUS	Oleg Salenko	31	10	19+6	7	5+1	3
	DF	(Spain) ESP	Juan Carlos	16	0	13+1	0	2	0
	MF	(Spain) ESP	Gaizka Mendieta	16	1	9+4	1	2+1	0
	MF	(Spain) ESP	Carlos Arroyo	24	4	7+10	3	2+5	1
	DF	(Spain) ESP	Juan José Maqueda	12	0	6+3	0	2+1	0
	FW	(Spain) ESP	Eloy Olaya	15	0	5+9	0	1	0
	FW	(Spain) ESP	Pepe Gálvez	19	3	5+8	2	3+3	1
	DF	(Spain) ESP	Pepe Serer	9	0	6	0	3	0
	MF	(Spain) ESP	Vicente Engonga	11	0	5+4	0	1+1	0
	FW	(Spain) ESP	Raúl Ibañez	4	1	3+1	1		
	DF	(Spain) ESP	Quique Medina	1	0	0+1	0		
	MF	(Spain) ESP	Botella	1	0	0	0	1	0
	GK	(Spain) ESP	Jorge Bartual	0	0	0	0	0	0
	DF	(Spain) ESP	Fran Figueroa						
	DF	(Spain) ESP	Javi Navarro						

- Source: https://www.bdfutbol.com/es/t/t1994-9536.html
