= 1995–96 Valencia CF season =

Valencia CF
1995–96 season
- President: Francisco Roig
- Manager: Luis Aragonés
- Stadium: Mestalla
- La Liga: Runner-up (in UEFA Cup)
- Copa del Rey: Semifinals
- Top goalscorer: League: Predrag Mijatović (28 ) All: Mijatović (34 )
Home colours	Away colours

During the 1995–96 Spanish football season, Valencia CF competed in La Liga and the Copa del Rey.

== Summary ==
During summer the club appointed Luis Aragonés as its new manager. In the 1995–96 La Liga Valencia were involved in a title race for the first time since the late 1970s.

After a series of impressive performances, stretching from January to March the club reached the second place of the table with a 4–1 victory over Cruijff' FC Barcelona. On 11 March 1996 club star and Forward Predrag Mijatovic signed an agreement with Real Madrid for an upcoming season (1996–97) contract. During April their league form faltered, and the title challenge looked over. However the club managed to re-establish itself back at the top in May. An emphatic 2–3 defeat of Atlético de Madrid at Vicente Calderón Stadium in April was the team's signature performance.

The club's fanbase and the entire province paid tribute to the squad regardless of their failure to win the trophy.

== Squad ==
Squad at end of season

Note: Flags indicate national team as defined under FIFA eligibility rules; some limited exceptions apply. Players may hold more than one non-FIFA nationality.

No.	Pos.	Nation	Player
1	GK	ESP	Andoni Zubizarreta
2	DF	ESP	Vicente Engonga
3	DF	ESP	Jorge Otero
4	DF	ESP	Paco Camarasa (captain)
5	MF	BRA	Mazinho
6	MF	ESP	Gaizka Mendieta
7	FW	ESP	Sietes
8	FW	YUG	Predrag Mijatović
9	FW	BRA	Viola
10	MF	ESP	Fernando Gomez
11	MF	ESP	Antonio Poyatos
12	MF	ESP	Xabier Eskurza

No.	Pos.	Nation	Player
13	GK	ESP	Jorge Bartual
14	MF	ESP	José Ignacio Saenz
15	MF	ESP	Patxi Ferreira
16	MF	ESP	Francisco Muedra
17	FW	ESP	Iñaki Hurtado
18	MF	ESP	Carlos Arroyo
19	DF	ESP	Javi Navarro
20	FW	ESP	Pepe Serer
21	DF	ESP	Enrique Romero
22	FW	ESP	Pepe Galvez
23	FW	ESP	Luciano Alkorta
26	FW	ESP	Raúl Martínez

=== Transfers ===
In
Pos.	Name	from	Type
FW	Viola	Corinthians	
MF	José Ignacio Sáenz	Logroñés	
DF	Patxi Ferreira	Atlético Madrid	
DF	Sietes	Real Oviedo	
DF	Xabier Eskurza	FC Barcelona	
MF	Iñaki Hurtado	Real Valladolid	
DF	Iván Campo	Deportivo Alavés	

Out
Pos.	Name	To	Type
FW	Luboslav Penev	Atlético Madrid	
GK	José Molina	Atlético Madrid	
FW	Oleg Salenko	Glasgow Rangers	
DF	Fernando Giner	Sporting Gijón	
MF	Robert	Villarreal	
DF	Álvaro Cervera	Racing Santander	
MF	Juan Carlos	Real Valladolid	
DF	Eloy	Sporting Gijón	
MF	Maqueda	Albacete Balompié	
DF	Raúl Ibañez	Real Valladolid	
DF	Quique Medina	Deportivo Alavés	
DF	Iván Campo	Real Valladolid	loan

Source: BDFutbol.com

== Competitions ==
=== La Liga ===
==== League table ====
Pos	Team	Pld	W	D	L	GF	GA	GD	Pts	Qualification or relegation
1	Atlético Madrid (C)	42	26	9	7	75	32	+43	87	Qualification for the Champions League group stage
2	Valencia	42	26	5	11	77	51	+26	83	Qualification for the UEFA Cup first round
3	Barcelona	42	22	14	6	72	39	+33	80	Qualification for the Cup Winners' Cup first round (Note: Since Atlético Madrid, winners of 1995–96 Copa del Rey, was qualified for the 1996–97 UEFA Champions League, losing cup finalists Barcelona earned a spot in the first round of the 1996–97 UEFA Cup Winners' Cup.)
4	Espanyol	42	20	14	8	63	36	+27	74	Qualification for the UEFA Cup first round
5	Tenerife	42	20	12	10	69	54	+15	72	Qualification for the UEFA Cup first round

Source: LFP
Rules for classification: 1) points; 2) head-to-head points; 3) head-to-head goal difference; 4) head-to-head goals scored; 5) goal difference; 6) number of goals scored.
(C) Champions

==== Position by round ====
Round	1	2	3	4	5	6	7	8	9	10	11	12	13	14	15	16	17	18	19	20	21	22	23	24	25	26	27	28	29	30	31	32	33	34	35	36	37	38	39	40	41	42
Ground	A	H	A	H	A	H	A	H	A	H	H	A	H	A	H	A	H	A	H	A	H	H	A	H	A	H	A	H	A	H	A	A	H	A	H	A	H	A	H	A	H	A
Result	L	W	W	D	L	W	W	D	L	W	W	L	D	W	L	W	L	W	W	L	W	W	W	W	L	W	D	W	L	W	W	W	W	L	W	L	W	W	W	W	W	D
Position	19	16	10	9	9	8	5	5	7	5	4	5	7	4	7	6	7	6	5	5	5	5	5	4	5	5	4	4	4	3	3	3	3	3	3	3	3	3	2	2	2	2

Source: Competitive matches
A = Away; H = Home; W = Win; D = Draw; L = Loss; = Leader, 1996–97 UEFA Champions League Group stage; = 1996–97 UEFA Cup First round; R = 1996–97 UEFA Cup Winners' Cup

==== Matches ====
2 September 1995 1	Deportivo La Coruña	3-0	Valencia	A Coruña
	Manjarin 30'; Canales (yellow card) 30'; Bebeto 36' 59'	Report	(yellow card) 16' Otero; (yellow card) 35' Sietes; (yellow card) 72' Jose Ignacio Saenz	Stadium: Riazor; Referee: Gracia Redondo

10 September 1995 2	Valencia	1-0	Real Valladolid	Valencia
	Zubizarreta (yellow card) 19'; Patxi Ferreira (yellow card) 42'; Galvez 58'; Poyatos (yellow card) 87'	Report	(yellow card) 60' Santamaria; (yellow card) 65' (yellow-red card) Santamaria; (yellow card) 84' Antia	Stadium: Mestalla; Referee: Megia Davila

17 September 1995 3	CP Mérida	0-2	Valencia	Mérida
	Momparlet (yellow card) 39'; Correa (yellow card) 42'; Momparlet (yellow card) 84' (yellow-red card)	Report	Mijatović 51'; Fernando 54'; Camarasa (yellow card) 61'	Stadium: Romano José Fouto; Referee: Garcia Aranda

24 September 1995 4	Valencia	0–0	Real Zaragoza	Valencia
	Otero (yellow card) 28'; Arroyo (yellow card) 38'; Arroyo (yellow card) 71' (yellow-red card)	Report	(yellow card) 14' Berti; (yellow card) 34' (yellow-red card) Berti; (yellow card) 77' Nayim; (yellow card) 78' Oscar Luis; (yellow card) 86' Juanmi	Stadium: Mestalla; Referee: Esquinas Torres

1 October 1995 5	Rayo Vallecano	3-2	Valencia	Madrid
	Palacios (yellow card) 30'; Aquino 53'; Onesimo 73'; Onesimo (yellow card) 80'; Calderon 85'	Report	(yellow card) 12' Camarasa; (yellow card) 31'Eskurza; (yellow card) 40' Mazinho; (yellow card) 46' Sietes; 58' (pen.) Mijatović; (yellow card) 61' Poyatos; 74' Mijatović; (yellow card) 75' (yellow-red card) Poyatos; (yellow card) 82' (yellow-red card) Camarasa	Stadium: Vallecas; Referee: Japón Sevilla

4 October 1995 6	Valencia	4-3	Real Madrid	Valencia
	Zubizarreta (yellow card) 13'; Gálvez 24'; Engonga (yellow card) 28'; Fernando 29'; Mijatović 39'; Patxi Ferreira 41'; Patxi Ferreira (yellow card) 67' (yellow-red card); Arroyo 83'	Report	(yellow card) 38' Redondo; (yellow card) 47' Laudrup; (yellow card) 49' Alkorta; 51' (pen.)Laudrup; 65'Alkorta; 89'Michel	Stadium: Mestalla; Referee: Andradas Asurmendi

8 October 1995 7	Real Oviedo	0-1	Valencia	Oviedo
	Beto (yellow card) 17'; Suarez (red card) 87' Suarez	Report	(yellow card) 26' Otero; (yellow card) 41' Javi Navarro; (yellow card) 43'; (yellow card) 68' Fernando Gomez; 78' Fernando Gomez; (yellow card) 81' Eskurza; (penalty missed) 86' Mijatovic; (yellow card) 87' (yellow-red card) Javi Navarro; (yellow card) 88' Scepanovic	Stadium: Carlos Tartiere; Referee: Prados Garcia

14 October 1995 8	Valencia	1-1	Real Betis	Valencia
	Otero (yellow card) 13'; Camarasa (yellow card) 21'; Gálvez 40'; Patxi Ferreira (yellow card) 36'; Sietes (yellow card) 41'; Arroyo (yellow card) 71'; Camarasa (yellow card) 81' (yellow-red card)	Report	(yellow card) 8' Sanchez Jara; (yellow card) 11' Alfonso Perez; 25' Pier; (yellow card) 30' Arpon; (yellow card) 36' Stosic	Stadium: Mestalla; Referee: Brito Arceo

22 October 1995 9	FC Barcelona	1-0	Valencia	Barcelona
	Popescu (yellow card) 23'; Ferrer (yellow card) 35'; Figo (yellow card) 79'; Prosinečki 83' (pen.)	Report	(yellow card) 35' Patxi Ferreira; (yellow card) 41' Jose Ignacio Saenz	Stadium: Camp Nou; Referee: Díaz Vega

29 October 1995 10	Valencia	3-1	Athletic de Bilbao	Valencia
	Camarasa 22'; Gálvez 23'; Mijatović 79'	Report	(yellow card) 29' Etxeberria; 81' Guerrero; (yellow card) 88' (yellow-red card) Etxeberria	Stadium: Mestalla; Referee: Lopez Nieto

5 November 1995 11	Valencia	5-2	SD Compostela	Valencia
	Mijatović 6'; Otero (yellow card) 24'; Mijatović 27'pen Viola 53'; Gálvez 63'; Eskurza (yellow card) 70'; Poyatos (yellow card) 77'; Passi 81' (o.g.)	Report	10' Jose Ramon; (yellow card) 20' Eraña; (yellow card) 27'Falagan; 60' Christensen; (yellow card) 66' Bellido	Stadium: Mestalla; Referee: Rodriguez Martel

12 November 1995 12	UD Salamanca	4-0	Valencia	Villares de la Reina
	Torrecilla (yellow card) 2'; Stinga 73'; Barbara 5'; Barbara 11'; Medina (yellow card) 63'; (yellow card) 70' Barbara; Claudio 71'	Report	(yellow card) 53' Camarasa; (yellow card) 67' Patxi Ferreira; (yellow card) 67' (yellow-red card) Patxi Ferreira; (yellow card) 76'Sietes; (yellow card) 89' Del Solar	Stadium: Helmántico; Referee: Megia Davila

19 November 1995 13	Valencia	2-2	CD Tenerife	Valencia
	Otero (yellow card) 27'; Jose Ignacio Saenz (yellow card) 31'; Gomez 57' (o.g.); Gálvez 47'; Sietes (yellow card) 70'	Report	(yellow card) 7' Pinilla; (yellow card) 12' Pizzi; 21' Pizzi; (yellow card) 33' Carlos Aguilera; 49' Pizzi; (yellow card) 87' Ojeda	Stadium: Mestalla; Referee: Prados Garcia

26 November 1995 14	Albacete Balompié	1-3	Valencia	Albacete
	Maqueda (yellow card) 53'; Jose Ignacio 57' (o.g.); (yellow card) 71' Luque; (yellow card) 73' Coco	Report	5'Mijatović; (yellow card) 6'Jose Ignacio; (yellow card) 58' Otero; (yellow card) 74' Engonga; (yellow card) 78' Poyatos; 82' Mijatović; 89' Viola	Stadium: Carlos Belmonte; Referee: Gomez Lopez

3 December 1995 15	Valencia	0-1	Real Sociedad	Valencia
	Mijatovic (yellow card) 28'; Engonga (yellow card) 51'; Engonga (yellow card) 79' (yellow-red card); Viola (yellow card) 83'	Report	(yellow card) 29' Aranzabal; (yellow card) 36' Albistegui; 58' Idiakez; (yellow card) 70' Imaz; (yellow card) 81' Fuentes; (yellow card) 87' Loren	Stadium: Mestalla; Referee: Garcia Aranda

9 December 1995 16	Racing Santander	0-3	Valencia	Santander
	Merino (yellow card) 43'; Txema (yellow card) 67'; Esteban Torre (yellow card) 89'	Report	4' Mijatović; 23' Fernando Gomez; (yellow card) 32' Mazinho; 64' Mijatović	Stadium: El Sardinero; Referee: Puentes Leira

17 December 1995 17	Valencia	0-1	Atlético de Madrid	Valencia
	Engonga (yellow card) 33'; Otero (yellow card) 44'; Mazinho (yellow card) 56'; Jose Ignacio Saenz (yellow card) 69'; Jose Ignacio Saenz (yellow card) 87' (yellow-red card)	Report	(yellow card) 30' Simeone; (yellow card) 65' Caminero; (yellow card) 68' Penev; 72' Delfi Geli; 88' Caminero; (yellow card) 88' (yellow-red card) Delfi Geli	Stadium: Mestalla; Referee: Gracia Redondo

20 December 1995 18	Sporting de Gijón	1-3	Valencia	Gijón
	Hugo Perez (yellow card) 13'; Tino (yellow card) 16'; Muñiz (yellow card) 27'; Yekini 73'; Eloy (yellow card) 80'	Report	(yellow card) 13' Mijatovic; 41' Mijatović; (yellow card) 44' Poyatos; (yellow card) 50' Romero; (yellow card) 67' Mazinho; 75' Mijatović; (yellow card) 76' Zubizarreta; 85' Viola	Stadium: El Molinón; Referee: Iturralde Gonzalez

3 January 1995 19	Valencia	1-0	Sevilla CF	Valencia
	Mijatovic (yellow card) 37'; Arroyo 75'; Arroyo (yellow card) 78'	Report	(yellow card) 31' Prieto	Stadium: Mestalla; Referee: Barrenechea Montero

7 January 1995 20	RCD Espanyol	2-0	Valencia	Barcelona
	Cristobal (yellow card) 16'; Lardin 29'; Lardin 80'	Report	(yellow card) 23' Viola; (yellow card) 70' Mazinho; (yellow card) 85' Otero	Stadium: Sarrià; Referee: Lopez de La Fuente

14 January 1996 21	Valencia	3-0	RC Celta	Valencia
	Romero 18'; Romero (yellow card) 20'; Camarasa (yellow card) 27'; Arroyo (yellow card) 41'; Arroyo 53'; Romero (yellow card) 65' (yellow-red card); Poyatos 89'	Report	(yellow card) 17' Aguirretxu; (yellow card) 22' Patxi Salinas; (yellow card) 26' Alejo; (yellow card) 64' Gudelj; (yellow card) 67' (yellow-red card) Alejo	Stadium: Mestalla; Referee: Diaz Vega

20 January 1996 22	Valencia	2-1	Deportivo La Coruña	Valencia
	Mazinho (yellow card) 11'; Otero (yellow card) 23'; Mijatović 66'; Otero (yellow card) 85' (yellow-red card); Mijatović 88' (pen.)	Report	15' Aldana; (yellow card) 30' Aldana; (yellow card) 35' Lopez Rekarte; (yellow card) 56' Bebeto; (yellow card) 72' Ribera; (yellow card) 77' Mauro Silva	Stadium: Mestalla; Referee: Nuñez Manrique

24 January 1996 23	Real Valladolid	2-5	Valencia	Valladolid
	Vara (yellow card) 10'; Fernando (yellow card) 31'; Quevedo 64'; Mosquera (yellow card) 70'; Benjamin 82'	Report	4' Gálvez; 22' Gálvez; (yellow card) 33' Camarasa; (yellow card) 44' Mijatovic; 58' Gálvez; 24'Fernando; 55' Fernando; (yellow card) 81' Javi Navarro	Stadium: José Zorrilla

28 January 1996 24	Valencia	4-1	Mérida	Valencia
	Mijatovic (yellow card) 16'; Mendieta (yellow card) 20'; Poyatos 30'; Mijatović 35'; Mijatović 67' (pen.); Gálvez 70'; Poyatos (yellow card) 71'; Javi Navarro (yellow card) 76'	Report	(yellow card) 23' Correa; 75' Sergio Corino; (yellow card) 84' Luis Sierra	Stadium: Mestalla; Referee: Prados Garcia

3 February 1996 25	Real Zaragoza	4-1	Valencia	Zaragoza
	Poyet 26'; Solana (yellow card) 54'; Morientes 70'; Morientes 76'; Morientes 85'	Report	(yellow card) 40' Engonga; 67' Gálvez	Stadium: La Romareda; Referee: Iturralde Gonzalez

10 February 1996 26	Valencia	3-0	Rayo Vallecano	Valencia
	Camarasa 27'; Mijatović 11'; Eskurza 75'	Report	(yellow card) 29' Ruano; (yellow card) 68' Barla	Stadium: Mestalla; Referee: Puentes Leira

17 February 1996 27	Real Madrid	0-0	Valencia	Madrid
	Sanchis (yellow card) 72'	Report	(yellow card) 25' Poyatos	Stadium: Santiago Bernabéu; Referee: Mejuto Gonzalez

25 February 1996 28	Valencia	3-1	Real Oviedo	Valencia
	Poyatos (yellow card) 10'; Poyatos 13'; Mijatović 53'; Romero (yellow card) 85'; Arroyo 88'; Viola (yellow card) 88'	Report	(yellow card) 10' Onopko; (yellow card) 27' Oli; 32' Cesar; (yellow card) 40' Armando	Stadium: Mestalla; Referee: Esquinas Torres

3 March 1996 29	Real Betis	3-0	Valencia	Seville
	Olias (yellow card) 38'; Sabas 55'; Sabas 67'; Sabas 71'; Merino (yellow card) 83'	Report	(yellow card) 36' Mazinho; (yellow card) 82' Engonga	Stadium: Benito Villamarín; Referee: Barrenechea Moreno

9 March 1996 30	Valencia	4-1	FC Barcelona	Valencia
	Mijatovic (yellow card) 18'; Fernando Gomez 40'; Viola 43'; Mijatović 48'; Mijatović 88'	Report	(yellow card) 15' Abelardo; (yellow card) 45' Amor; (yellow card) 53' Guardiola; (yellow card) 66' Figo 68'Amor; (yellow card) 71' Popescu	Stadium: Mestalla; Referee: Carmona Mendez

17 March 1996 31	Athletic de Bilbao	0-1	Valencia	Bilbao
	Oscar Vales (yellow card) 7'; Urrutia (yellow card) 30'; Garitano (yellow card) 83'; Larrazabal (yellow card) 88'	Report	(yellow card) 8' Viola; (yellow card) 16' Javi Navarro; (yellow card) 55' Camarasa; (yellow card) 72' Eskurza; 86' Viola	Stadium: San Mamés; Referee: Brito Arceo

24 March 1996 32	SD Compostela	0-4	Valencia	Santiago de Compostela
	Bellido (yellow card) 17'; Tocornal (yellow card) 23'; Mauro (yellow card) 68'	Report	(yellow card) 22' Javi Navarro; Viola 28'; (yellow card) 29' Fernando Gomez; (yellow card) 36' (yellow-red card) Javi Navarro; Viola 40'; Mijatović 74'; Arroyo 62'	Stadium: San Lázaro; Referee: Andujar Oliver

27 March 1996 33	Valencia	2-0	UD Salamanca	Valencia
	Otero (yellow card) 39'; Poyatos 42'; Viola 65'	Report	(yellow card) 13' Medina; (yellow card) 37' Claudio; (yellow card) 37' Josema; (yellow card) 46' (yellow-red card) Josema	Stadium: Mestalla; Referee: Nuñez Manrique

31 March 1996 34	Tenerife	2-1	Valencia	Santa Cruz de La Palma
	Cesar Gomez (yellow card) 42'; Pizzi (yellow card) 60'; Chano (yellow card) 66'; Llorente 74'; Carlos Aguilera (yellow card) 76'; Alexis Suarez (yellow card) 77'; Pizzi 80'	Report	17' Fernando; (yellow card) 21' Mendieta; (yellow card) 23' Javi Navarro; (yellow card) 26' Viola; (yellow card) 28' Mazinho; (yellow card) 45' Poyatos; (yellow card) 89' Romero	Stadium: Heliodoro Rodríguez López; Referee: Díaz Vega

7 April 1996 35	Valencia	1-0	Albacete Balompié	Valencia
	Camarasa (yellow card) 63'; Arroyo (yellow card) 68'; Fernando 85'	Report	(yellow card) 7' Josico; (yellow card) 69' Brau; (red card) 87' Luna	Stadium: Mestalla; Referee: García Aranda

14 April 1996 36	Real Sociedad	5-2	Valencia	San Sebastián
	Gracia (yellow card) 11'; Luis Perez 12'; Luis Perez 15'; Loren (yellow card) 25'; Luis Perez 35'; Craioveanu 32'; Craioveanu (yellow card) 39'; Gracia (yellow card) 47' (yellow-red card); Karpin 74'; Albistegui (yellow card) 87'	Report	(yellow card) 10' Mazinho; (yellow card) 43'Camarasa; 49' Fernando; (yellow card) 65'Mijatovic; (yellow card) 77' Javi Navarro; Mijatovic 80'	Stadium: Anoeta

20 April 1996 37	Valencia	2-1	Racing de Santander	Valencia
	Viola 5'; Mazinho (yellow card) 16'; Mendieta (yellow card) 41'; Viola 43'; Eskurza (yellow card) 70'	Report	16' Billabona; (yellow card) 21' Pablo Alfaro; (yellow card) 70' Esteban Torre	Stadium: Mestalla; Referee: Megia Davila

27 April 1996 38	Atlético de Madrid	2-3	Valencia	Madrid
	Santi Denia (yellow card) 26'; Pantic 44'; Delfi Geli 57'; Simeone (yellow card) 60'; Kiko (red card) 76'; Solozabal (yellow card) 89'; Pantic (yellow card) 92'	Report	11' Mijatović; (yellow card) 21' Poyatos; (yellow card) 28'Jose Ignacio Saenz; (yellow card) 39' Engonga; 55' (pen.) Mijatović; 74'Poyatos; (yellow card) 88' Otero	Stadium: Vicente Calderón; Referee: Dauden Ibañez

4 May 1996 39	Valencia	1-0	Sporting de Gijón	Valencia
	Viola 57'	Report	(yellow card) 32' Bango; (yellow card) 36' Muñiz	Stadium: Mestalla; Referee: Puentes Leira

12 May 1996 40	Sevilla	1-2	Valencia	Seville
	Marcos (yellow card) 27'; Rafa Paz (yellow card) 38'; Martagon (yellow card) 45'; Pineda (yellow card) 61'; Jímenez (yellow card) 74'; Šuker 74'; Suker (yellow card) 81'; Moya (yellow card) 82'; Prieto (red card) 86'	Report	(yellow card) 28' Engonga; Mijatović 34' (pen.); (yellow card) 52' (yellow-red card); (yellow card) 58' (yellow-red card) Poyatos; 65' Mijatović; (penalty missed) 90' Mijatovic	Stadium: Sánchez Pizjuán; Referee: Iturralde González

19 May 1996 41	Valencia	1-0	RCD Espanyol	Valencia
	Jose Ignacio Saenz (yellow card) 58'; Otero (yellow card) 59'; Viola (yellow card) 60'; Arroyo 62'	Report	(yellow card) 23' Arteaga; (yellow card) 39' Pochettino; (yellow card) 70' Torres Mestre; (yellow card) 80' Arroyo	Stadium: Mestalla; Referee: Mejuto González

25 May 1996 42	RC Celta	1-1	Valencia	Vigo
	Milojevic 89'; Ratkovic (yellow card) 11'; Patxi Salinas (yellow card) 25'; Vicente (yellow card) 72'	Report	(yellow card) 31' Patxi Ferreira; 43' Mijatović; (yellow card) 80' Otero; (yellow card) 89' Camarasa; (yellow card) 90' Poyatos	Stadium: Balaídos; Referee: López Nieto

Source: Competitive Matches

=== Copa del Rey ===
==== Second Round ====
25 October 1995	Mallorca	0-0	Valencia	Mallorca
				Stadium: Olimpico

8 November 1995	Valencia	0-0	Mallorca	Valencia
				Stadium: Mestalla

==== Third Round ====
30 November 1995	Real Oviedo	1-1	Valencia	Oviedo
	Oli 55'		77' Mijatović	Stadium: Principado de Asturias

12 December 1995	Valencia	1-0	Real Oviedo	Valencia
	Berto 45' (o.g.)			Stadium: Mestalla

==== Eightfinals ====
10 January 1996	RC Celta	1-1	Valencia	Albacete
	Sánchez 63'		12' Fernando	Stadium: Carlos Belmonte

17 January 1995	Valencia CF	3-0	RC Celta	Valencia
	Mijatović 21' (pen.); Arroyo 36'; Gálvez 56'			Stadium: Mestalla

==== Quarterfinals ====
30 January 1996	Sevilla CF	1-1	Valencia	Sevilla
	Monchu 19'		33' (pen.) Mijatović	Stadium: Sanchez Pizjuan

13 February 1996	Valencia CF	2-0	Sevilla CF	Valencia
	Mijatović 32', 68'			Stadium: Mestalla

==== Semifinals ====
21 February 1996	Valencia CF	3-5	Atlético de Madrid	Valencia
	Gálvez 6'; Fernando Gomez 44'; Engonga (red card) 61'; Mijatović 90'; (yellow card) Romero; Patxi Ferreira (yellow card); Zubizarreta (yellow card); Camarasa (yellow card); Poyatos (yellow card)	Report (in Spanish)	(penalty missed) 1' Lubo Penev; 47' Pantić; 64'Pantić; 72' Biagini; 80' Juan Carlos; 88' Roberto; (yellow card) Simeone; (yellow card) Santi Denia; (yellow card) Toni; (yellow card) Kiko; (yellow card) Leo Biagini; (yellow card) Vizcaino	Stadium: Mestalla; Referee: Lopez Nieto
Note: Goalkeeper Zubizarreta blocked a penalty shot by Penev.

29 February 1996	Atlético de Madrid	1-2	Valencia CF	Madrid
	Pantić 45' (pen.); Vizcaino (yellow card) 50'; Delfi Geli (yellow card) 52'; Penev (yellow card) 72'; Lopez (yellow card) 80'	Report (in Spanish)	(yellow card) 7' Javi Navarro; 20' Viola; 53' Fernando Gomez; (yellow card) 56' Poyatos; (yellow card) 66' Camarasa; (yellow card) 87' (yellow-red card) Camarasa; (yellow card) 88' Arroyo	Stadium: Vicente Calderon; Attendance: 25,000; Referee: Gracia Redondo

== Statistics ==
=== Players statistics ===
No.	Pos	Nat	Player	Total		La Liga		Copa del Rey	
No.	Pos	Nat	Player	Apps	Goals	Apps	Goals	Apps	Goals
1	GK	(Spain) ESP	Andoni Zubizarreta	47	-52	39	-44	8	-8
3	DF	(Spain) ESP	Jorge Otero	44	0	37	0	7	0
4	DF	(Spain) ESP	Paco Camarasa	48	2	39	2	9	0
2	DF	(Spain) ESP	Vicente Engonga	33	0	19+6	0	8	0
21	DF	(Spain) ESP	Enrique Romero	39	1	29+1	1	9	0
6	MF	(Spain) ESP	Gaizka Mendieta	42	0	30+4	0	7+1	0
5	MF	(Brazil) BRA	Mazinho	50	0	39+1	0	9+1	0
14	MF	(Spain) ESP	José Ignacio	33	0	21+6	0	5+1	0
10	MF	(Spain) ESP	Fernando Gomez	51	13	42	10	9	3
8	FW	(Federal Republic of Yugoslavia) YUG	Predrag Mijatović	49	34	40	28	9	6
22	FW	(Spain) ESP	Pepe Gálvez	37	13	27+1	11	7+2	2
13	GK	(Spain) ESP	Jorge Bartual	6	-8	3+1	-7	2	-1
11	MF	(Spain) ESP	Antonio Poyatos	41	5	19+13	5	4+5	0
15	DF	(Spain) ESP	Patxi Ferreira	27	0	17+7	0	2+1	0
9	FW	(Brazil) BRA	Viola	37	12	15+15	11	5+2	1
19	DF	(Spain) ESP	Javi Navarro	25	0	15+4	0	5+1	0
7	FW	(Spain) ESP	Sietes	25	0	13+7	0	1+4	0
12	MF	(Spain) ESP	Xabier Eskurza	31	1	11+16	1	2+2	0
18	MF	(Spain) ESP	Carlos Arroyo	36	7	6+24	6	2+4	1
17	FW	(Spain) ESP	Iñaki Hurtado	15	0	1+10	0	0+4	0
20	FW	(Spain) ESP	Pepe Serer	0	0	0	0	0	0
26	FW	(Spain) ESP	Raul Martinez	2	0	0+2	0	0	0

- Source: https://www.bdfutbol.com/en/t/t1995-9636.html

== See also ==
- Valencia CF
- 1995–96 La Liga
- 1995–96 Copa del Rey
