= 1995 Copa del Rey final =

- Event: 1994–95 Copa del Rey
Deportivo La Coruña	Valencia
2	1
- Date: 24 June 1995 (susp.); 27 June 1995
- Venue: Santiago Bernabéu, Madrid
- Referee: José María García-Aranda
- Attendance: 95,000; 81,000

The 1995 Copa del Rey final was the 93rd final of the Spanish cup competition, the Copa del Rey. The final was played at Santiago Bernabéu Stadium in Madrid on 24 June 1995. The match was suspended after 79 minutes due to heavy rain and hail, and was resumed on 27 June 1995. The match was won by Deportivo de La Coruña, who beat Valencia CF 2–1 for their first cup title.

== Road to the final ==
Deportivo de La Coruña			Round	Valencia
Opponent	Result	Legs		Opponent	Result	Legs
UE Lleida	7–1	0–3 away; 4–1 home	Round of 16	Real Madrid	4–2	1–2 away; 2–1 home
Athletic Bilbao	3–0	3–0 home; 0–0 away	Quarterfinals	RCD Mallorca	4–1	1–0 away; 4–0 home
Sporting de Gijón	2–1	0–2 away; 0–1 home	Semifinals	Albacete Balompié	3–2	1–1 home; 2–1 away

== Match details ==
=== Final ===
24 June 1995
21:00 CEST

Deportivo La Coruña	1–1 (suspended)	Valencia
35' Manjarín	Report	70' Mijatović

Santiago Bernabéu Stadium, Madrid
Attendance: 95,000
Referee: José María García-Aranda

=== Rematch ===
27 June 1995
20:30 CEST

Deportivo La Coruña	2–1	Valencia
35' Manjarín; 81' Alfredo		70' Mijatović

Santiago Bernabéu Stadium, Madrid
Attendance: 81,000
Referee: José María García-Aranda

Deportivo La Coruña

Valencia

GK	1	(Spain) Francisco Liaño
DF	7	(Spain) Luis López Rekarte
DF	2	(Spain) Voro
DF	5	(Federal Republic of Yugoslavia) Miroslav Đukić
DF	4	(Spain) José Luis Ribera
DF	3	(Spain) Nando
MF	8	(Spain) Adolfo Aldana		(substituted off) 50'
MF	6	(Brazil) Donato Gama
MF	10	(Spain) Fran (c)
FW	9	(Spain) Javier Manjarín	(yellow card) 85'	(substituted off) 90'
FW	11	(Brazil) Bebeto	(yellow card) 84'
Substitutes:
MF	12	(Spain) Francisco Villarroya
GK	13	(Spain) Juan Canales
MF	14	(Spain) Alfredo		(substituted on) 50'
FW	15	(Spain) Claudio Barragán		(substituted on) 90'
FW	16	(Spain) Julio Salinas
Manager:
(Spain) Arsenio Iglesias

GK	1	(Spain) Andoni Zubizarreta
DF	2	(Spain) Gaizka Mendieta	(yellow card) 56' (red card) 90'
DF	5	(Spain) Fernando Giner
DF	4	(Spain) Francisco José Camarasa
DF	3	(Spain) Juan Carlos Rodríguez	(yellow card) 33'	(substituted off) 81'
MF	11	(Spain) Antonio Poyatos
MF	6	(Brazil) Mazinho
MF	10	(Spain) Fernando Gómez
MF	7	(Spain) Roberto Fernández
FW	8	(Federal Republic of Yugoslavia) Predrag Mijatović
FW	9	(Bulgaria) Lyuboslav Penev (c)
Substitutes:
DF	12	(Spain) José Serer
GK	13	(Spain) José Manuel Sempere
MF	14	(Spain) Vicente Engonga
MF	15	(Spain) Carlos Arroyo
FW	16	(Spain) José Gálvez		(substituted on) 81'
Manager:
(Spain) José Manuel Rielo

MATCH RULES

- 90 minutes.
- 30 minutes of extra-time if necessary.
- Penalty shoot-out if scores still level.
- Five named substitutes.
- Maximum of two substitutions.

Copa del Rey
1994–95 Winners

1st title
