= 1988–89 FC Barcelona season =

90th season in existence of FC Barcelona

Barcelona
1988–89 season
- President: Josep Lluís Núñez
- Head Coach: Johan Cruyff
- Stadium: Camp Nou
- La Liga: 2nd
- Copa del Rey: Quarter-finals
- Supercopa de España: Runners-up
- Cup Winners' Cup: Winners
- Top goalscorer: League: Julio Salinas (20); All: Julio Salinas (22)
| Home colours | Away colours | Third colours |

The 1988–89 season was Barcelona's 90th season in existence and the club's 58th consecutive season in the top flight of Spanish football.

== Squad ==
Note: Flags indicate national team as defined under FIFA eligibility rules; some limited exceptions apply. Players may hold more than one non-FIFA nationality.

| No. | Pos. | Nation | Player |
|---|---|---|---|
| — | GK | ESP | Juan Carlos Unzué |
| — | GK | ESP | Andoni Zubizarreta |
| — | DF | BRA | Aloísio |
| — | DF | ESP | José Ramón Alexanko (captain) |
| — | DF | ESP | Julio Alberto |
| — | DF | ESP | Salva |
| — | DF | ESP | Ricardo Serna |
| — | DF | ESP | Pepe Serer |
| — | DF | ESP | Sergi |
| — | DF | ESP | Miquel Soler |
| — | DF | ESP | Cristóbal |
| — | DF | ESP | Luis López Rekarte |

| No. | Pos. | Nation | Player |
|---|---|---|---|
| — | MF | ESP | Guillermo Amor |
| — | MF | ESP | José Mari Bakero |
| — | MF | ESP | Eusebio |
| — | MF | PAR | Romerito |
| — | MF | ESP | Jordi Roura |
| — | MF | ESP | Urbano |
| — | MF | ESP | Luis Milla |
| — | MF | ESP | Robert |
| — | FW | ESP | Lobo Carrasco |
| — | FW | ESP | Ernesto Valverde |
| — | FW | ESP | Txiki Begiristain |
| — | FW | ESP | Julio Salinas |
| — | FW | ENG | Gary Lineker |

=== Transfers ===
In
| Pos. | Name | from | Type |
|---|---|---|---|
| FW | Julio Salinas | Atlético Madrid | |
| MF | Eusebio | Atlético Madrid | |
| MF | José Mari Bakero | Real Sociedad | |
| FW | Txiki Begiristain | Real Sociedad | |
| DF | Luis López Rekarte | Real Sociedad | |
| DF | Miquel Soler | Espanyol | |
| MF | Ernesto Valverde | Espanyol | |
| DF | Aloisio | Internacional | |
| MF | Romerito | Fluminense | |
| DF | Ricardo Serna | Sevilla | |
| MF | Guillermo Amor | Barcelona B | |
| MF | Luis Milla | Barcelona B | |
| MF | Jordi Roura | Barcelona C | |
| FW | Mark Hughes | Bayern Munich | loan ended |
| FW | Steve Archibald | Blackburn Rovers | loan ended |
| MF | Jordi Vinyals | Castellón | loan ended |
| DF | Martin | | loan ended |
| DF | Carlos | | loan ended |
| DF | Esteve Fradera | Sabadell | loan ended |
| DF | Villarroya | | loan ended |

Out
| Pos. | Name | To | Type |
|---|---|---|---|
| MF | Bernd Schuster | Real Madrid | free |
| MF | Víctor Muñoz | Sampdoria | free |
| FW | Mark Hughes | Manchester United | |
| FW | Steve Archibald | Hibernian | |
| DF | Migueli | | retired |
| DF | Gerardo | Las Palmas | free |
| FW | Paco Clos | Real Murcia | released |
| MF | Josep Moratalla | Figueres | released |
| MF | Ángel Pedraza | Mallorca | released |
| MF | Manolo | Real Murcia | released |
| GK | Urruti | | retired |
| MF | Ramón Calderé | Real Betis | released |
| FW | Juan Carlos Rojo | Real Betis | released |
| GK | Covelo | | released |
| DF | Lopez Lopez | | released |
| MF | Nayim | Tottenham Hotspur | released |
| FW | Raul Vicente Amarilla | Club Olimpia | released |
| MF | Jordi Vinyals | Castellón | released |
| DF | Martin | | released |
| DF | Carlos | | released |
| DF | Esteve Fradera | Sabadell | released |
| DF | Villarroya | | released |

== Competitions ==
=== La Liga ===
==== League table ====
| Pos | Team | Pld | W | D | L | GF | GA | GD | Pts | Qualification or relegation |
|---|---|---|---|---|---|---|---|---|---|---|
| 1 | Real Madrid (C) | 38 | 25 | 12 | 1 | 91 | 37 | +54 | 62 | Qualification for the European Cup first round |
| 2 | Barcelona | 38 | 23 | 11 | 4 | 80 | 26 | +54 | 57 | Qualification for the Cup Winners' Cup first round (Note: Qualify for Cup Winners' Cup as holders.) |
| 3 | Valencia | 38 | 18 | 13 | 7 | 39 | 26 | +13 | 49 | Qualification for the UEFA Cup first round |
| 4 | Atlético Madrid | 38 | 19 | 8 | 11 | 69 | 45 | +24 | 46 | Qualification for the UEFA Cup first round |
| 5 | Zaragoza | 38 | 15 | 13 | 10 | 48 | 42 | +6 | 43 | Qualification for the UEFA Cup first round |

Source: BDFútbol
(C) Champions

==== Results by Round ====
| Round | 1 | 2 | 3 | 4 | 5 | 6 | 7 | 8 | 9 | 10 | 11 | 12 | 13 | 14 | 15 | 16 | 17 | 18 | 19 | 20 | 21 | 22 | 23 | 24 | 25 | 26 | 27 | 28 | 29 | 30 | 31 | 32 | 33 | 34 | 35 | 36 | 37 | 38 |
|---|---|---|---|---|---|---|---|---|---|---|---|---|---|---|---|---|---|---|---|---|---|---|---|---|---|---|---|---|---|---|---|---|---|---|---|---|---|---|
| Ground | H | A | H | A | H | A | H | A | H | A | A | H | A | H | A | A | H | H | A | A | H | A | H | A | H | A | H | A | H | H | H | A | A | H | A | H | A | H |
| Result | W | W | D | D | W | W | W | L | W | D | W | W | W | W | L | W | W | W | D | D | W | D | L | W | W | W | D | D | D | W | W | W | L | W | D | W | D | W |
| Position | 3 | 1 | 3 | 2 | 2 | 1 | 1 | 2 | 2 | 2 | 2 | 2 | 1 | 1 | 2 | 2 | 2 | 2 | 2 | 2 | 2 | 2 | 2 | 2 | 2 | 2 | 2 | 2 | 2 | 2 | 2 | 2 | 2 | 2 | 2 | 2 | 2 | 2 |

Source: BDFutbol
A = Away; H = Home; W = Win; D = Draw; L = Loss; = Leader, 1989-90 European Cup; = 1989-90 UEFA Cup; = 1989-90 Segunda Division; c = 1989–90 European Cup Winners' Cup

==== Matches ====
| 3 September 1988 1 | Barcelona | 2–0 | Espanyol | Barcelona |
| | Begiristain 61'; Roberto 64' (pen.) | | | Stadium: Camp Nou |

| 11 September 1988 2 | Elche | 0–3 | Barcelona | Elche |
| | | | Salinas 16', 30'; Alexanko 69' | Stadium: Martínez Valero |

| 17 September 2008 3 | Barcelona | 1–1 | Valencia | Barcelona |
| | Roberto 87' | | Gómez 70' | Stadium: Camp Nou |

| 24 September 1988 4 | Osasuna | 1–1 | Barcelona | Pamplona |
| | Ibañez 31' | | Bakero 56' | Stadium: El Sadar |

| 2 October 1988 5 | Barcelona | 4–0 | Sporting de Gijón | Barcelona |
| | Serna 1' 3'; Salinas 7', 64' | | | Stadium: Camp Nou |

| 8 October 1988 6 | Real Sociedad | 0–1 | Barcelona | San Sebastián |
| | | | Salinas 8' | Stadium: Atotxa |

| 16 October 1988 7 | Barcelona | 3–0 | Real Betis | Barcelona |
| | Roberto 23' (pen.); Bakero 64'; Begiristain 85' | | | Stadium: Camp Nou |

| 22 October 1988 8 | Real Madrid | 3–2 | Barcelona | Madrid |
| | Sánchez 57'; Aldana 59'; Gordillo 81' | | Bakero 21'; Carrasco 70' | Stadium: Santiago Bernabeu |

| 30 October 1988 9 | Real Zaragoza | 1–0 | Barcelona | Barcelona |
| | Roberto 20' | | | Stadium: Camp Nou |

| 6 November 1988 10 | Real Valladolid | 0–0 | Barcelona | Valladolid |
| | | | | Stadium: Jose Zorrilla |

| 20 November 1988 11 | Real Oviedo | 1–2 | Barcelona | Oviedo |
| | Bango 13' | | Lineker 26'; Salinas 45' | Stadium: Carlos Tartiere |

| 27 November 1988 12 | Barcelona | 3–1 | Real Murcia | Barcelona |
| | Begiristain 6'; Lineker 12', 45' | | Sánchez 38' | Stadium: Camp Nou |

| 1 December 1988 13 | Celta Vigo | 0–3 | Barcelona | Vigo |
| | | | Salinas 27', 29'; Eusebio 89' | Stadium: Balaidos |

| 4 December 1988 14 | Barcelona | 2–1 | Logroñés | Barcelona |
| | Begiristain 20'; Salinas 64' | | Alzamendi 22' | Stadium: Camp Nou |

| 10 December 1988 15 | Athletic Bilbao | 3–2 | Barcelona | Bilbao |
| | Uralde 8'; Mendiguren 40' 62' | | Bakero 11'; Salinas 46' | Stadium: San Mamés |

| 1 January 1989 16 | Atlético Madrid | 1–3 | Barcelona | Madrid |
| | Baltazar 21' (pen.) | | Roberto 53'; Lineker 64'; Bakero 85' | Stadium: Vicente Calderon |

| 8 January 1989 17 | Barcelona | 3–0 | Cádiz | Barcelona |
| | Eusebio 51'; Salinas 73'; Bakero 80' | | | Stadium: Camp Nou |

| 11 January 1989 18 | Barcelona | 4–0 | Sevilla | Barcelona |
| | Salinas 22'; Bakero 31'; Lineker 46'; Begiristain 89' | | | Stadium: Camp Nou |

| 15 January 1989 19 | Málaga | 2–2 | Barcelona | Málaga |
| | Pineda 19'; Paquito 30' | | Roberto 57'; Amor 84' | Stadium: La Rosaleda |

| 29 January 1989 20 | Espanyol | 2–2 | arcelona | Barcelona |
| | Gabino 20'; José Gay 66' (pen.) | | Bakero 35'; Amor 73' | Stadium: Sarriá |

| 12 February 1989 21 | Barcelona | 2–0 | Elche | Barcelona |
| | Bakero 57'; Amor 67' | | | Stadium: Camp Nou |

| 18 February 1989 22 | Valencia | 1–1 | Barcelona | Valencia |
| | Fernando Gómez 2' | | Salinas 16' | Stadium: Mestalla |

| 26 February 1989 23 | Barcelona | 1–2 | Osasuna | Barcelona |
| | Amor 1' | | Ziganda 9' 76' | Stadium: Camp Nou |

| 4 March 1989 24 | Sporting de Gijón | 0–2 | Barcelona | Gijón |
| | | | Roberto 23' (pen.); Begiristain 37' | Stadium: El Molinon |

| 11 March 1989 25 | Barcelona | 4–1 | Real Sociedad | Barcelona |
| | Lineker 6'; Roberto 66' (pen.); Begiristain 74'; Bakero 89' | | 63'Iturrino | Stadium: Camp Nou |

| 25 March 1989 26 | Real Betis | 0–2 | Barcelona | Seville |
| | | | Salinas 60', 76' | Stadium: Benito Villamarin |

| 1 April 1989 27 | Barcelona | 0–0 | Real Madrid | Barcelona |
| | | | | Stadium: Camp Nou |

| 9 April 1989 28 | Real Zaragoza | 0–0 | Barcelona | Zaragoza |
| | | | | Stadium: La Romareda |

| 15 April 1989 29 | Barcelona | 0–0 | Real Valladolid | Barcelona |
| | | | | Stadium: Camp Nou |

| 30 April 1989 30 | Barcelona | 7–1 | Real Oviedo | Barcelona |
| | Salinas 10', 44', 62'; Begiristain 25', 83'; Roberto 74'; Eusebio 89' | | 52'Gonzalez | Stadium: Camp Nou |

| 25 May 1989 31 | Real Murcia | 2–0 | Barcelona | Murcia |
| | Sanchez 51'; Ibeas 63' |

| 14 May 1989 32 | Barcelona | 3–1 | Celta Vigo | Barcelona |
| | Amor 17' (pen.), 81', 89' | | 90' (pen.)Zambrano | Stadium: Camp Nou |

| 21 May 1989 33 | Logroñés | 0–2 | Barcelona | Logroño |
| | | | Begiristain 60'; Eusebio 86' | Stadium: Las Gaunas |

| 27 May 1989 34 | Barcelona | 3–0 | Athletic Bilbao | Barcelona |
| | Amor 51'; Urbano 52'; Soler 55' | | | Stadium: Camp Nou |

| 3 June 1989 35 | Sevilla | 1–1 | Barcelona | Seville |
| | Bengoechea 11' | | Valverde 26' | Stadium: Ramón Sánchez-Pizjuán Stadium |

| 10 June 1989 36 | Barcelona | 3–0 | Atlético Madrid | Barcelona |
| | Roberto 40'; Begiristain 52'; Salinas 63' | | | Stadium: Camp Nou |

| 18 June 1989 37 | Cádiz | 1–1 | Barcelona | Cádiz |
| | Cortijo 20' | | Salinas 33' | Stadium: Nuevo Mirandilla |

| 24 June 1989 38 | Barcelona | 4–0 | Málaga | Barcelona |
| | Romerito 16'; Valverde 17'; Begiristain 26'; Roberto 58' | | | Stadium: Camp Nou |

=== Copa del Rey ===
==== Round of 32 ====
| 25 January 1989 First leg | Cartagena | 0–3 | Barcelona |
| | | | Valverde 26'; Salinas 53'; Amor 58' |

| 1 February 1989 Second leg | Barcelona | 4–0 (7–0 agg.) | Cartagena |
| | Amor 18', 77'; Salinas 36', 43' |

==== Round of 16 ====
| 16 February 1989 First leg | Racing Santander | 0–1 | Barcelona |
| | | | Lineker 34' |

| 1 February 2006 Second leg | Barcelona | 3–2 (4–2 agg.) | Racing Santander |
| | Carrasco 34'; Valverde 48'; Roberto 77' | | Julián 14', 82' |

==== Quarter-finals ====
| 29 March 1989 First leg | Barcelona | 3–3 | Atlético Madrid |
| | Julio Alberto 30'; Roberto 53'; Salinas 86' | | Baltazar 36', 48' (pen.), 66' |

| 12 April 1989 Second leg | Atlético Madrid | 4–0 (7–3 agg.) | Barcelona |
| | Donato 6'; Baltazar 53' (pen.), 69'; Manolo 84' |

=== European Cup Winners Cup ===
==== First round ====
| 7 September 1988 1 | Fram (Iceland) | 0–2 | (Spain) Barcelona |
| | | | Roberto 33', 62' |

| 5 October 1988 2 | Barcelona (Spain) | 5–0 | (Iceland) Fram |
| | Lineker 9'; Begiristain 23', 63'; Roberto 66'; Bakero 70' |

==== Second round ====
| 26 October 1988 1 | Lech Poznań (Poland) | 1–1 | (Spain) Barcelona |
| | Pachelski 66' | | Roberto 26' (pen.) |

| 9 November 1988 2 | Barcelona (Spain) | 1–1 (a.e.t.) (5–4 p) | (Poland) Lech Poznań |
| | Kruszczyński 28' (pen.) | | Roberto 37' |
| | Penalties |
| | Kruszczyński (penalty scored); Jakołcewicz (penalty scored); Rzepka (penalty scored); Araszkiewicz (penalty missed); Pachelski (penalty missed); Głombiowski (penalty scored); Łukasik (penalty missed) | | (penalty missed) Roberto; (penalty scored) Begiristain; (penalty scored) Valverde; (penalty scored) Eusebio; (penalty missed) Alexanko; (penalty scored) Bakero; (penalty scored) Aloísio |

==== Quarter-finals ====
| 1 March 1989 1 | AGF (Denmark) | 0–1 | (Spain) Barcelona |
| | | | Lineker 70' |

| 15 March 1989 2 | Barcelona (Spain) | 0–0 | (Denmark) AGF |

==== Semi-finals ====
| 5 April 1989 1 | Barcelona (Spain) | 4–2 | (Bulgaria) CSKA Sofia |
| | Lineker 36'; Amor 37'; Bakero 48'; Salinas 72' | | Stoichkov 24', 67' (pen.) |

| 19 April 1989 2 | CSKA Sofia (Bulgaria) | 1–2 | (Spain) Barcelona |
| | Stoichkov 65' | | Lineker 25'; Amor 81' |

==== Final ====
| 10 May 1989 | Barcelona (Spain) | 2–0 | (Italy) Sampdoria | Bern |
| 20:15 CEST | Salinas 4'; López Rekarte 79' | Report | | Stadium: Wankdorf Stadium; Attendance: 45,000; Referee: (England) George Courtney |

=== Supercopa ===
| 21 September 1988 | Real Madrid | 2–0 | Barcelona |
| | Michel 51'; Sánchez 78' |

| 29 September 1988 | Barcelona | 2–1 (2–3 agg.) | Real Madrid |
| | Bakero 37', 78' | | Butragueño 15' |

== Statistics ==
=== Players statistics ===
| No. | Pos | Nat | Player | Total | | La Liga | | Cup Winners' Cup | | Copa del Rey | |
| No. | Pos | Nat | Player | Apps | Goals | Apps | Goals | Apps | Goals | Apps | Goals |
|---|---|---|---|---|---|---|---|---|---|---|---|
| | GK | (Spain) ESP | Zubizarreta | 47 | -37 | 36 | -25 | 9 | -5 | 2 | -7 |
| | DF | (Spain) ESP | Lopez Rekarte | 33 | 1 | 23+2 | 0 | 4+1 | 1 | 3 | 0 |
| | DF | (Spain) ESP | Ricardo Serna | 45 | 2 | 30+3 | 2 | 7+1 | 0 | 2+2 | 0 |
| | DF | (Brazil) BRA | Aloísio | 38 | 0 | 26+1 | 0 | 7 | 0 | 4 | 0 |
| | MF | (Spain) ESP | Bakero | 28 | 12 | 22 | 10 | 6 | 2 | 0 | 0 |
| | MF | (Spain) ESP | Luis Milla | 41 | 0 | 28 | 0 | 8 | 0 | 4+1 | 0 |
| | MF | (Spain) ESP | Robert | 52 | 15 | 37 | 8 | 8+1 | 5 | 4+2 | 2 |
| | MF | (Spain) ESP | Eusebio | 51 | 4 | 36+1 | 4 | 8 | 0 | 6 | 0 |
| | FW | (England) ENG | Lineker | 38 | 11 | 25+1 | 6 | 8 | 4 | 4 | 1 |
| | FW | (Spain) ESP | Salinas | 50 | 26 | 36+1 | 20 | 6+1 | 2 | 5+1 | 4 |
| | FW | (Spain) ESP | Begiristain | 50 | 14 | 38 | 12 | 8+1 | 2 | 2+1 | 0 |
| | GK | (Spain) ESP | Unzue | 6 | -3 | 2 | -1 | 0 | 0 | 4 | -2 |
| | DF | (Spain) ESP | Alexanko | 28 | 1 | 9+10 | 1 | 3+2 | 0 | 4 | 0 |
| | DF | (Spain) ESP | Julio Alberto | 22 | 1 | 10+2 | 0 | 3+1 | 0 | 6 | 1 |
| | MF | (Spain) ESP | Amor | 38 | 13 | 9+18 | 8 | 5 | 2 | 5+1 | 3 |
| | MF | (Paraguay) PAR | Romerito | 7 | 1 | 7 | 1 | 0 | 0 | 0 | 0 |
| | MF | (Spain) ESP | Roura | 8 | 0 | 3+5 | 0 | 0 | 0 | 0 | 0 |
| | MF | (Spain) ESP | Urbano | 19 | 1 | 12+2 | 1 | 3+2 | 0 | 0 | 0 |
| | FW | (Spain) ESP | Lobo Carrasco | 25 | 2 | 9+5 | 1 | 4+2 | 0 | 4+1 | 1 |
| | FW | (Spain) ESP | Valverde | 16 | 4 | 6+4 | 2 | 0+1 | 0 | 4+1 | 2 |
| | DF | (Spain) ESP | Sergi | 8 | 0 | 4+3 | 0 | 0+1 | 0 | 0 | 0 |
| | DF | (Spain) ESP | Miquel Soler | 31 | 1 | 9+14 | 1 | 2+2 | 0 | 3+1 | 0 |
| | DF | (Spain) ESP | Salva | 4 | 0 | 1+2 | 0 | 0 | 0 | 0+1 | 0 |
| | DF | (Spain) ESP | Serer | 1 | 0 | 0+1 | 0 | 0 | 0 | 0 | 0 |
| | DF | (Spain) ESP | Cristóbal | | | | | | | | |
