= José Manuel Ochotorena =

Spanish footballer (1961–2025)

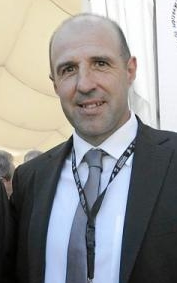
- Ochotorena in 2010

Personal information
- Full name: José Manuel Ochotorena Santacruz
- Date of birth: 16 January 1961
- Place of birth: Hernani, Spain
- Date of death: 26 October 2025 (aged 64)
- Place of death: Valencia, Spain
- Height: 1.82 m (6 ft 0 in)
- Position: Goalkeeper

Youth career
- 1970–1976: Hernani
- 1976–1979: Real Madrid

Senior career*
Years	Team	Apps	(Gls)
1979–1984	Castilla	76	(0)
1982–1988	Real Madrid	29	(0)
1988–1992	Valencia	105	(0)
1992–1994	Tenerife	12	(0)
1994–1995	Logroñés	20	(0)
1995–1997	Racing Santander	1	(0)
1997–1998	Logroñés	0	(0)
Total		243	(0)

International career
1989	Spain	1	(0)
- * Club domestic league appearances and goals

José Manuel Ochotorena Santacruz (16 January 1961 – 26 October 2025) was a Spanish professional footballer who played as a goalkeeper.

He appeared in 167 La Liga matches over 11 seasons, with Real Madrid, Valencia, Tenerife, Logroñés and Racing de Santander, winning five titles with the first of those clubs. He was part of the Spain squad at the 1990 World Cup.

After retiring, Ochotorena became a goalkeeping coach, working for over two decades with Valencia and the Spain national team and also spending three seasons at Liverpool in the Premier League.

== Club career ==
Born in Hernani, Gipuzkoa, Ochotorena emerged through Real Madrid's youth ranks, making his first-team debut late in the 1981–82 season due to a professionals strike as he was still part of the reserve side setup. He would have to wait until 1985–86 to become a starter, helping the capital club to that year's La Liga and UEFA Cup titles, but lost his spot the following campaign after the signing of Sevilla's Francisco Buyo.

Subsequently, Ochotorena signed for Valencia, winning the Ricardo Zamora Trophy in his first year by being replaced mere minutes into the last match at Real Madrid to maintain his average. On 17 September 1989, he was in goal in a 6–2 loss to his previous employers.

Ochotorena was first-choice for the better part of his first three seasons at the Mestalla Stadium, but was sent off in a game against the same opponents on 15 April 1991. Afterwards, he played second-fiddle to youth graduate José Manuel Sempere.

Ochotorena retired in 1998 aged 37, following unassuming spells with Tenerife, Logroñés (he played most of the matches in the 1994–95 campaign, but the Riojans were relegated) and Racing de Santander.

== International career ==
Ochotorena earned one cap for Spain, taking the place of Andoni Zubizarreta for the final ten minutes of a friendly against Poland in A Coruña on 20 September 1989. He was included in the final squad for the 1990 FIFA World Cup, alongside Zubizarreta and Juan Carlos Ablanedo.

== Coaching career ==
After retiring, Ochotorena assumed goalkeeping coach duties at both Valencia and the Spain national team. When his compatriot Rafael Benítez joined Premier League club Liverpool in July 2004, he replaced Joe Corrigan. During his time at Anfield, the side won the 2004–05 UEFA Champions League, the 2005 UEFA Super Cup and the 2005–06 FA Cup, finishing runners-up in the 2006–07 Champions League.

Ochotorena returned to Valencia once again in the summer of 2007, being replaced at Liverpool by Xavi Valero. He also continued to work with Spain, leaving his post in February 2021.

Ochotorena was part of the national team staff under Vicente del Bosque as they won the 2010 FIFA World Cup and the 2008 and 2012 UEFA European Championships. He remained at the Mestalla Stadium for the rest of his career, taking part in the team’s 2018–19 Copa del Rey triumph.

== Death ==
After nearly four decades dedicated to football, Ochotorena retired to his home in Valencia. His health declined in his final years due to an aggressive form of cancer, which he had battled for a long time. He died in the early hours of 26 October 2025, at the age of 64.

Ochotorena's passing was widely mourned across Spanish and European football, reflecting the respect he earned during his long career as both player and coach.

== Honours ==
Castilla

- Segunda División: 1983–84

Real Madrid

- La Liga: 1985–86, 1987–88
- Copa de la Liga: 1985
- UEFA Cup: 1984–85, 1985–86

Individual

- Ricardo Zamora Trophy: 1988–89
