= José González (footballer, born 1964) =

Spanish footballer (born 1964)

Personal information
- Full name: José Luis González Vázquez
- Date of birth: 27 August 1964 (age 62)
- Place of birth: Elgoibar, Spain
- Height: 1.86 m (6 ft 1 in)
- Position: Goalkeeper

Youth career
- Elgoibar

Senior career*
Years	Team	Apps	(Gls)
1981–1982	Elgoibar		
1983–1985	San Sebastián	50	(0)
1984–1992	Real Sociedad	134	(0)
1992–1994	Valencia	12	(0)
1994–1995	Valladolid	29	(0)
1995–1996	Atlético Marbella	15	(0)
1996–2001	Xerez	122	(0)
2001–2002	San Fernando	36	(0)
Total		398+	(0)
- * Club domestic league appearances and goals

José Luis González Vázquez (born 27 August 1964) is a Spanish former footballer who played as a goalkeeper. He played 175 games in La Liga for Real Sociedad, Valencia and Real Valladolid.

== Career ==
=== Real Sociedad ===
Born in Elgoibar in the Basque Country, González played for his hometown club CD Elgoibar before joining Real Sociedad. He made his first-team debut on 13 November 1984 in the second round of the Copa del Rey at home to Santurce, a 3–1 win. His La Liga debut came on 1 December 1985 in a 5–1 home loss to Barcelona just two days after playing a youth team match; first-choice Spain international goalkeeper Luis Arconada was injured and back-up Agustín Elduayen needed an emergency operation for appendicitis.

González succeeded Arconada as starting goalkeeper upon his retirement in 1989. He played 154 games over all competitions for La Real, including saving a penalty kick from Joaquín Villa in a 2–1 home win over Sporting de Gijón on 24 June 1989, the day Arconada retired.

=== Valencia ===
In 1992, González transferred to Valencia, where he was second-choice to José Manuel Sempere. In his last appearance, the final game of the 1993–94 La Liga season away to Deportivo de La Coruña, the home team needed to win for their first ever league title. A penalty was awarded in added time with regular taker Donato substituted and Bebeto rejecting the opportunity to take it; Miroslav Đukić took it and González saved, handing the title to Barcelona. González celebrated his feat by punching the air. In 2016, González said he was tired of being reminded of the game.

=== Later career ===
González moved to Real Valladolid before the 1994–95 season, being joined by former Valencia teammate Miodrag Belodedici. In late August 1995, he was linked to Segunda División club Atlético Marbella as part of a deal that would see fellow goalkeeper Diego Díaz transfer from Atlético Madrid – owned by Marbella mayor Jesús Gil – to Valladolid. The deal was concluded days later.

González later played for Xerez, helping them to promotion from the Segunda División B in 1996–97. He kept a clean sheet of 840 minutes, extending into the playoffs.

After retiring, González worked as a goalkeeping coach for Xerez, Almería, Hércules and Xerez Deportivo. He was part of teams that won promotion to La Liga with the first and third of those clubs.
