= Akilino Etxarri =

Spanish footballer (born 1969)

Akilino Etxarri Ollokiegi (born 15 March 1969) is a Spanish former footballer who played as a midfielder.

== Playing career ==
Born in Pasaia, Etxarri was a youth player at Añorga in San Sebastián before joining the youth ranks at Real Sociedad. He played for the reserve team before leaving for Segunda División team Eibar in June 1990.

After one season at Tomelloso, Etxarri joined Valencia, again playing mainly in the second team. On 3 October 1993, amid injuries and suspensions, manager Guus Hiddink called up Etxarri and three other reserves for a La Liga game away to Lleida. He debuted in the 1–1 draw as a last-minute substitute for Predrag Mijatović. In December, Etxarri and two others were relegated to the reserve team by new manager Paco Real and two replacements promoted.

Etxarri continued playing in Segunda División B for Real Murcia, Pontevedra and Castellón. In 1997, he signed for Tercera División club Ceuta to join his friend Luis Garmendia, and helped the team to promotion in his first season.

In 2001, Etxarri returned to his native Gipuzkoa, signing for Real Unión. In 2002–03, the side missed out on promotion with a loss to Gramenet in the last playoff game. The team made the playoffs again two years later, but Etxarri was released in December by manager Manix Mandiola due to the performances of the younger Joaquín Sorribas in his position.

== Post-playing career ==
After retiring from playing, Etxarri remained with the team from Irun, as technical secretary. He was in office as they won promotion to the second tier in 2009, ending a 45-year exile. He left a year later as the team were relegated, and was approached by manager Iñaki Alonso to follow him to Real Murcia, but he decided against it due to wanting stability for his family.

Etxarri managed Club Deportivo Vasconia de Donostia to two promotions in the Basque regional leagues before being dismissed in January 2014. He also managed Orioko in the same competition, resigning halfway through a season due to lack of energy.

In 2020, Etxarri told El Diario Vasco that he had been the delegate in northern Spain for a sportswear brand for the past four years. Three years later, El Faro de Ceuta said that he was a delegate for Erreà, an Italian brand whose Spanish operations were centred mostly in the Basque Country.
