= Iñaki Hurtado =

Spanish footballer (born 1972)

Personal information
- Full name: José Ignacio Hurtado Capilla
- Date of birth: 26 February 1972 (age 54)
- Place of birth: Logroño, Spain
- Height: 1.71 m (5 ft 7 in)
- Position: Midfielder

Senior career*
Years	Team	Apps	(Gls)
1989–1990	Logroñés	3	(0)
1990–1991	Numancia	30	(5)
1991–1993	Valladolid B	72	(17)
1991–1995	Valladolid	56	(1)
1995–1998	Valencia	25	(1)
1997–1998	→ Villarreal (loan)	32	(1)
1998–2002	Numancia	136	(6)
2002–2004	Zaragoza	20	(0)
2004–2005	Valladolid	10	(0)
Total		384	(31)
- * Club domestic league appearances and goals

José Ignacio Hurtado Capilla (born 26 February 1972) is a Spanish former footballer who played as a midfielder.

He totalled 155 La Liga games and 2 goals for Logroñés, Valladolid, Valencia, Numancia and Zaragoza, winning the Copa del Rey in 2004 with the last club. In the Segunda División, he added 127 games and 7 goals for Villarreal, Numancia, Zaragoza and Valladolid.

== Career ==
=== Early career ===
Born in Logroño in La Rioja, Hurtado began his career at hometown club Logroñés. He made his debut in La Liga on 18 June 1989 in the penultimate game of the season, as a 64th-minute substitute for Adolfo Muñoz.

In 1991, Hurtado transferred to Real Valladolid in the same league. He scored his first top-flight goal on 16 January 1994, coming off the bench to win the game 2–1 at Celta Vigo.

=== Valencia ===
Hurtado transferred to Valencia in July 1995, while manager Luis Aragonés arrived at the club. His opportunities were limited at the Mestalla Stadium and he scored once as a late substitute in a 2–0 home win over Celta on 30 November 1996, Jorge Valdano's first game as manager.

For the 1997–98 season, Hurtado was loaned to Villarreal in the Segunda División. He was part of the "Yellow Submarine" side that won promotion to La Liga for the first time; his only goal in a 2–0 win away to Leganés on 3 May secured a play-off place.

=== Later career ===
In 1998, Hurtado moved to Numancia, where he had previously played in the Segunda División B eight years earlier. The team from Soria won promotion in his first season and played two top-flight campaigns; his winning goal away to Leganés on 19 May 2002 saved them from a second consecutive relegation.

Hurtado transferred to Real Zaragoza for free in 2002, with his debut being delayed by adductor muscle injury. In November 2003, after the club's promotion, he told El Periódico de Aragón that he was hurt by booing from the crowd. He was part of the squad that won the Copa del Rey that season, scoring in a 3–2 win at Salamanca in the last 32 on 17 December.

In July 2004, Hurtado returned to Valladolid after nine years away.

== Personal life ==
After retiring, Hurtado played for Logroñés's veterans' team and worked as an agent, with clients including Joselu. In his retirement, Hurtado took part in hunting. He featured in a documentary on his hobby on Movistar+ in 2024.
