= José Manuel Rielo =

Spanish former footballer

Personal information
- Full name: José Manuel Rielo Talens
- Date of birth: 5 May 1946 (age 80)
- Place of birth: Xàtiva, Spain
- Position: Midfielder

Senior career*
Years	Team	Apps	(Gls)
1969–1974	Alcoyano		
1974–1978	Olímpico	36+	(1+)
1978–1980	Alcira		

Managerial career
- Mestalla
- 1994: Valencia (interim)
- 1995: Valencia (interim)
- 1996: Valencia (interim)
- 1998: Elche
- 1998–2000: Mestalla
- * Club domestic league appearances and goals

José Manuel Rielo Talens (born 5 May 1946) is a Spanish former footballer and manager. He was interim manager at La Liga club Valencia in 1994, 1995 and 1996, finishing runners-up in the Copa del Rey in 1995, and led Elche in the Segunda División in 1998.

== Career ==
=== Early career ===
Born in Xàtiva in the Province of Valencia, Rielo played as a midfielder for minor clubs in the Valencian Community before joining the coaching staff at Valencia CF. He managed the reserve team, C.D. Mestalla, to promotion to Segunda División B.

=== Valencia ===
Rielo was assistant manager at Valencia under Guus Hiddink, who was dismissed in November 1993. In March 1994, when Francisco Roig Alfonso was installed as club president, he accepted the resignation of Héctor Núñez and brought in Rielo as interim manager until Hiddink could return. On his debut on 13 March, Rielo won 2–1 away to RC Celta de Vigo, following this a week later with a 1–0 home win over Sporting de Gijón in his only other match. Before his first match, he had said that he would have been happy with a draw, due to the potency of opposing forward Vladimir Gudelj.

At the start of June 1995, Valencia sacked Carlos Alberto Parreira – the manager who had won the 1994 FIFA World Cup for Brazil – and installed Rielo until the end of the season. The team were 11th with three games remaining; as Rielo did not have the appropriate licence to manage more than two games, the club paid a fine for the last match. His debut on 3 June was a 5–0 loss at RCD Espanyol. Ten days later, his team won 2–1 at Albacete Balompié in the semi-finals of the Copa del Rey, improving on a 1–1 draw in the home leg under Parreira; it was their first qualification for the cup final since 1979. Rielo's team played a defensive game and took their opportunities on the counter-attack; before the match, player Robert Fernández had said "If we play football, we will lose". The final on 24 June against Deportivo was abandoned due to rain with 11 minutes remaining and the score at 1–1; the remainder was played three days later and Alfredo Santaelena scored the winning goal for Depor.

Rielo had a third and final stint as Valencia manager in 1996, between the resignation of Luis Aragonés and the hiring of Jorge Valdano. His only game on 24 November was a 4–2 loss at Real Madrid, who went top of the league.

=== Later career ===
In February 1998, Rielo was hired at Elche CF of the Segunda División, on an 18-month deal. His debut on 15 February was a 3–0 loss at Atlético Madrid B, and the performance was called "awful" by Jaume Soler of Mundo Deportivo. He was sacked with two games remaining, with Delfín Álvarez seeing out a campaign that ended in relegation.

Rielo returned to Valencia B in June 1998, still in the third tier. He resigned in April 2000, leaving Manuel Gálvez in charge for the final five games before relegation.
