= Oleg Salenko =

Ukrainian-Russian footballer

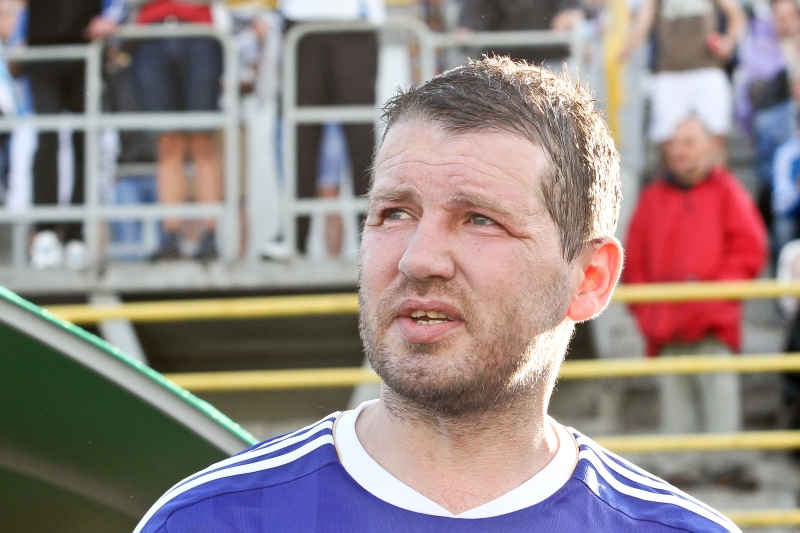
- Salenko in 2014

Personal information
- Full name: Oleg Anatolyevich Salenko
- Date of birth: 25 October 1969 (age 57)
- Place of birth: Leningrad, Russian SFSR, Soviet Union
- Height: 1.81 m (5 ft 11 1/2 in)
- Position: Striker

Youth career
- Smena Leningrad

Senior career*
Years	Team	Apps	(Gls)
1986–1988	Zenit	47	(10)
1989–1992	Dynamo Kyiv	91	(28)
1993–1994	Logroñés	47	(23)
1994–1995	Valencia	25	(7)
1995–1996	Rangers	16	(7)
1996–1998	İstanbulspor	18	(11)
1999–2000	Córdoba	3	(0)
2000–2001	Pogoń Szczecin	1	(0)
Total		248	(86)

International career
1984–1991	Soviet Union U20	4	(5)
1992	Ukraine	1	(0)
1993–1994	Russia	8	(6)
Medal record
Representing the Soviet Union
UEFA European Under-21 Championship
Winner	1990 Europe
UEFA European Under-18 Championship
Winner	1988 Czechoslovakia
- * Club domestic league appearances and goals

Oleg Anatolyevich Salenko (Russian: Оле́г Анато́льевич Сале́нко; born 25 October 1969) is a Russian former footballer who played as a forward. He scored a record five goals in a group-stage match in the 1994 World Cup, helping him earn the Golden Boot as joint-top tournament goalscorer.

== Club career ==
Salenko was born to a Ukrainian father and a Russian mother in Leningrad (now Saint Petersburg), Russian SFSR, which was then part of the Soviet Union. He played for Zenit Leningrad, Dynamo Kyiv, Logroñés, Córdoba, Valencia, Rangers and İstanbulspor during his club career, that lasted from 1986 to 2000.

Eventually, he faded from the international football scene and finally had to end his career prematurely, at the age of 31, for injury reasons. Salenko returned to playing professional football in the 2000–01 season and signed for Pogoń Szczecin. He retired after playing a single game due to his physical conditioning.

== International career ==
Salenko played for the Soviet Union under-20 team at the 1989 FIFA World Youth Championship, becoming the tournament top scorer with 5 goals. He played a total of only nine international matches, including the Ukraine 1–3 Hungary friendly, which was the first international game for the Ukraine national football team to be recognised by FIFA. He also had eight appearances for Russia and scored six goals, all of them at the World Cup in which he was joint top scorer. His last international appearance was 6–1 win against Cameroon when he scored five times.

As of 2024, he is the only player to win the Golden Boot at both the U-20 World Cup and FIFA World Cup.

=== 1994 FIFA World Cup ===
Salenko set a World Cup record by scoring five goals in one game in Russia's 6–1 win against Cameroon on 28 June 1994. He finished the 1994 World Cup with six goals, having scored from the penalty spot against Sweden in the previous match and shared the Golden Boot with Bulgarian Hristo Stoichkov after being knocked out in the first round and having played only three matches while Bulgaria played a total of seven matches and achieved a fourth-place finish.Salenko is the only player ever to win the Golden Boot award while playing for a team eliminated from the World Cup finals at the group stage.

== Beach football ==
In 2003, Salenko was appointed as manager of the Ukraine national beach soccer team. His team played three games, the only win being over USA 6–5, and losing the other two to Brazil and Spain. The tournament took place at the end of July in Portugal under the name Mundialito. After the tournament, he was dismissed. He was later taking part of FFU assisting staff, but later stopped being involved in football to focus on his business.

== Personal life ==
He is the father of Ukrainian footballer Roman Salenko, who made his debut with Dynamo Kyiv, the second team Oleg played for, in November 2024.

== Career statistics ==
=== Club ===
Appearances and goals by club, season and competition
Club	Season	League			National Cup (Note: Includes Soviet Cup, Ukrainian Cup and Copa del Rey)		League cup (Note: Includes USSR Federation Cup and Scottish League Cup)		Europe		Total	
Club	Season	Division	Apps	Goals	Apps	Goals	Apps	Goals	Apps	Goals	Apps	Goals
Zenit Leningrad	1986	Soviet Top League	11	3	3	1	5	0	—		19	4
Zenit Leningrad	1987	Soviet Top League	10	0	2	0	2	2	0	0	14	2
Zenit Leningrad	1988	Soviet Top League	26	7	1	0	2	2	—		29	9
Zenit Leningrad	Total		47	10	6	1	9	4	0	0	62	15
Dynamo Kyiv	1989	Soviet Top League	26	3	5	0	0	0	6 (Note: Appearances in UEFA Cup)	1	37	4
Dynamo Kyiv	1990	Soviet Top League	21	4	5	8	—		4 (Note: Appearances in European Cup Winners' Cup)	2	30	14
Dynamo Kyiv	1991	Soviet Top League	28	14	3	4	—		8 (Note: Two appearances and one goal in European Cup Winners' Cup, six appearances and two goals in European Cup)	3	39	21
Dynamo Kyiv	1992	Vyshcha Liha	16	7	4	1	—		4 (Note: Appearances in European Cup)	1	24	9
Dynamo Kyiv	Total		91	28	17	13	0	0	22	7	130	48
Logroñés	1992–93	La Liga	16	7	0	0	—		—		16	7
Logroñés	1993–94	La Liga	31	16	6	5	—		—		37	21
Logroñés	Total		47	23	6	5	0	0	0	0	53	28
Valencia	1994–95	La Liga	25	7	6	3	—		—		31	10
Rangers	1995–96	Scottish Premier Division	16	7	0	0	2	1	2 (Note: Appearances in UEFA Champions League)	0	20	8
İstanbulspor	1995–96	Süper Lig	15	11	—		—		—		15	11
İstanbulspor	1996–97	Süper Lig	1	0	0	0	—		—		1	0
İstanbulspor	1997–98	Süper Lig	2	0	0	0	—		0	0	2	0
İstanbulspor	Total		18	11	0	0	0	0	0	0	18	11
Córdoba	1999–2000	Segunda División	3	0	2	0	—		—		5	0
Pogoń Szczecin	2000–01	Ekstraklasa	1	0	0	0	—		—		1	0
Career total			248	86	37	22	11	5	24	7	320	120

=== International ===
Appearances and goals by national team and year

National team	Year	Apps	Goals
Ukraine
Ukraine	1992	1	0
Ukraine	Total	1	0
Russia
Russia	1993	1	0
Russia	1994	7	6
Russia	Total	8	6
Career total		9	6

International goals

Scores and results list Russia's goal tally first.

No	Date	Venue	Opponent	Score	Result	Competition
1.	24 June 1994	Pontiac Silverdome, Pontiac, United States	Sweden	1–0	1–3	1994 FIFA World Cup
2.	28 June 1994	Stanford Stadium, Stanford, United States	Cameroon	1–0	6–1	1994 FIFA World Cup
3.	28 June 1994	Stanford Stadium, Stanford, United States	Cameroon	2–0	6–1	1994 FIFA World Cup
4.	28 June 1994	Stanford Stadium, Stanford, United States	Cameroon	3–0	6–1	1994 FIFA World Cup
5.	28 June 1994	Stanford Stadium, Stanford, United States	Cameroon	4–1	6–1	1994 FIFA World Cup
6.	28 June 1994	Stanford Stadium, Stanford, United States	Cameroon	5–1	6–1	1994 FIFA World Cup

== Honours ==
Dynamo Kyiv

- Soviet Top League: 1990
- Soviet Cup: 1990

Rangers

- Scottish Football League Premier Division: 1996

Individual

- FIFA World Youth Championship Golden Shoe: 1989
- FIFA World Cup Golden Boot: 1994
- Oleh Blokhin club

== See also ==
- List of FIFA World Cup top goalscorers
