= Ignacio Ibáñez =

Chilean footballer (born 1996)

Personal information
- Full name: Ignacio Elías Ibáñez Santana
- Date of birth: 8 October 1996 (age 30)
- Place of birth: Chillán, Chile
- Height: 1.77 m (5 ft 10 in)
- Position: Winger

Team information
- Current team: Rangers
- Number: 7

Youth career
- Ñublense

Senior career*
Years	Team	Apps	(Gls)
2014	Ñublense B	8	(1)
2014–2019	Ñublense	61	(4)
2018	→ Everton (loan)	5	(0)
2020	Cobreloa	3	(0)
2021	Deportes Concepción	19	(0)
2022	Unión Española	15	(0)
2023	Universidad de Concepción	21	(0)
2024–	Rangers	57	(7)
- * Club domestic league appearances and goals as of 10 December 2025

Ignacio Elías Ibáñez Santana (born 8 October 1996) is a Chilean professional footballer who plays as a winger for Rangers de Talca.

== Career ==
A product of Ñublense youth system, Ibáñez made his debut in the Chilean Primera División while he was on loan at Everton in 2018. After ending his contract with Ñublense, he moved to Cobreloa in the Primera B. After a step in Deportes Concepción, he joined Unión Española for the 2022 Primera División.

In 2024, Ibáñez joined Rangers de Talca.
