= Roberto García (footballer, born 1973) =

Spanish footballer (born 1973)

Personal information
- Full name: Luis Roberto García Toral
- Date of birth: 30 May 1973 (age 53)
- Place of birth: León, Spain
- Height: 1.71 m (5 ft 7 in)
- Position: Right-back

Youth career
- Valencia

Senior career*
Years	Team	Apps	(Gls)
1992–1996	Valencia B	78	(9)
1994–1995	Valencia	2	(0)
1994–1995	→ Castellón (loan)	36	(6)
1996–1997	Endesa Andorra	33	(3)
1997–1998	Almería	37	(0)
1998–2000	Figueres	71	(7)
2000–2002	Badajoz	56	(1)
2002–2005	Gramenet	105	(0)
2005–2006	Terrassa	31	(0)
2006–2011	Huesca	128	(2)
Total		577	(28)

International career
1993	Spain U20	3	(1)

Managerial career
- 2016: Torrejón B
- 2016–2020: Fuenlabrada (assistant)
- 2020: Alcorcón (assistant)
- * Club domestic league appearances and goals

Luis Roberto García Toral (Spanish pronunciation: [ˈlwis roˈβeɾto ɣaɾˈθi.a toˈɾal]; born 30 May 1973) is a Spanish former professional footballer who played mainly as a right-back.

== Playing career ==
Born in León, García managed to appear twice for Valencia CF's first team during the 1993–94 season in La Liga, but spent his career mainly in the Segunda División and Segunda División B. He made his debut in the top flight on 20 March 1994, playing 60 minutes in a 1–0 home win against Sporting de Gijón.

García represented, other than Valencia, CD Castellón, Andorra CF, CP Almería, UE Figueres, CD Badajoz, UDA Gramenet, Terrassa FC and SD Huesca. In June 2011, after contributing 12 matches (ten starts, 914 minutes of action) as the last club retained its second-tier status, he retired from football at the age of 38.

== Coaching career ==
García started working as a coach in Huesca's academy. Later, in the same capacity, he had spells at CD Canillas and Real Madrid.

On 17 July 2016, García was appointed manager of AD Torrejón CF's reserve team. He subsequently acted as assistant to Antonio Calderón at CF Fuenlabrada and Mere at that side as well as AD Alcorcón.
