= Paco Real =

Spanish association football manager

Francisco Real Alacreu (1 March 1939 – 27 September 2011) was a Spanish football manager. His career was mostly associated with Valencia in a variety of roles, including managing the reserve team for several seasons and briefly being caretaker manager of the first team in 1993.

== Career ==
Born in Valencia, Real played in the 1950s for Portuarios, a farm team of Levante. He began managing several lower-league sides in the Valencian Community, including Alzira, Torrent and Burriana, while working at Bancaja.

Real entered Valencia CF in 1970 and served several roles at the club. He was director of their academy, as well as chief of external and institutional relations. Voro, who was managed by him in the reserve team, Mestalla, remembered him as a strict coach known as El Coronel.

In November 1993, the board of Valencia sacked manager Guus Hiddink, putting Real in charge pending the appointment of a permanent replacement. He made his debut in La Liga on 20 November, winning 1–0 away to Sevilla via a goal from Lyuboslav Penev, followed by a goalless draw at home to Real Sociedad and three defeats. Real fielded a different starting line-up in each of his games, scoring two goals and conceding eight over five games, and was replaced on 20 December by Héctor Núñez. In his penultimate game on 11 December, Real labelled Ronald Koeman of visitors Barcelona a "wardrobe" for his perceived lack of pace; Koeman scored in a 4–0 win and the national press caricatured Real as a Pavo Real (peacock). Valencia had not lost at home by that score since 1935, and would not again until 2017.

Real retired from Valencia in October 2004, having suffered a stroke after travelling to a match against Getafe. He lived with the after-effects until his death on 27 September 2011, aged 72.
