= Tomás González (Spanish footballer) =

Spanish footballer (born 1963)

Personal information
- Full name: Tomas González Rivera
- Date of birth: 3 March 1963 (age 63)
- Place of birth: Madrid, Spain
- Height: 1.83 m (6 ft 0 in)
- Position: Midfielder

Senior career*
Years	Team	Apps	(Gls)
1982–1983	Atlético Madrid C	23	(6)
1983–1985	Atlético Madrid B	80	(12)
1985–1989	Oviedo	137	(20)
1989–1994	Valencia	142	(9)
1994–1996	Racing Santander	65	(2)
1996–1997	Marino Luanco	33	(1)
Total		480	(50)
- * Club domestic league appearances and goals

Tomás González Rivera (born 3 March 1963), also known mononymously as Tomás, is a Spanish former footballer who played as a midfielder. He played 243 La Liga games and scored 18 goals, for Oviedo, Valencia and Racing Santander. Earlier in his career he recorded figures of 181 games and 25 goals in the Segunda División for Atlético Madrileño and Oviedo.

== Career ==
=== Atlético Madrid ===
Born in Madrid, Tomás came through the youth ranks of Atlético Madrid. He played for the C-team in the Tercera División before making his reserve team debut in the Segunda División on 30 January 1983 in a 1–1 home draw with Castilla, their equivalents from Real Madrid. In his third game on 13 February he scored his first goal in a 3–0 home win over Sabadell, adding another a week later to gain a 2–1 win at Rayo Vallecano also in the capital city; at this time he was known as Tomás II to differentiate himself from Tomás Reñones who was also known by his first name.

=== Real Oviedo ===
In July 1985, Tomás was loaned to Real Oviedo also in the second tier, having impressed their manager José Luis Romero in the four games that he played against the Asturian club the previous season. The following February, he publicly attacked Atlético manager Luis Aragonés for not fielding him or Antonio Cuevas in the first team.

On 24 January 1988, Tomás scored his only goal of Oviedo's promotion-winning season, a long-range strike in the 47th second of a 3–0 home win over Lleida, in which he was later sent off. He played both legs of the playoff win over Mallorca.

The 1988–89 season was Tomás's first in La Liga and he scored 7 goals in 36 games, including in an away draw and 5–2 home win over Atlético. The latter, which beat Abel Resino from near the halfway line, was likened by Mundo Deportivo to one attempted by Pelé.

=== Later career ===
In July 1989, Tomás, who had never suffered a serious injury by the age of 26, signed a four-year contract at Valencia. The transfer fee was estimated as 40 million Spanish pesetas.

Tomás stayed at the Mestalla Stadium until May 1994, when he transferred to Racing Santander. His only goal of his first season at the Cantabrian club was scored on 8 January in a 3–2 home win over his previous employer.
