= Fran (footballer, born June 1972) =

Spanish footballer

Personal information
- Full name: Francisco José Figueroa Alonso
- Date of birth: 22 June 1972 (age 54)
- Place of birth: Valencia, Spain
- Height: 1.82 m (6 ft 0 in)
- Positions: Right-back; midfielder

Senior career*
Years	Team	Apps	(Gls)
1990–1991	Torrent	3	(0)
1991–1992	Teruel	33	(5)
1992–1995	Valencia B	69	(7)
1992–1994	Valencia	2	(0)
1995–1997	Gimnàstic de Tarragona	54	(20)
1997–1998	Polideportivo Almería	36	(2)
1998–2001	Lleida	95	(4)
2001–2002	Espanyol	17	(0)
2002–2003	Real Oviedo	30	(2)
2003–2005	Hércules	45	(2)
Total		384	(42)
- * Club domestic league appearances and goals

Francisco José Figueroa Alonso (born 22 June 1972), known as Fran, is a Spanish former professional footballer who could play as a right-back or a midfielder. He played in La Liga for both Valencia and Espanyol, making a total of 19 top flight appearances.

== Club career ==
Born in Valencia, Fran began his career in 1990 with Segunda División B side Torrent. He spent 1991–92 in the Tercera División with Teruel, before joining La Liga side Valencia in 1992. He played only twice in the top division for Los Ches, but featured prominently for the B team in Segunda División B over the next three seasons.

In 1995, he moved on to Gimnàstic de Tarragona, and was part of the side that won Segunda División B in 1996–97. Fran then spent one season with Polideportivo Almería, before earning a move to the Segunda División with Lleida in 1998. Lleida enjoyed mixed fortunes over Fran's three seasons at the club, finishing as runners-up in the Copa Catalunya in 1999, but suffering relegation from the second tier in 2000–01.

Following Lleida's relegation, Fran was able to return to La Liga with Espanyol. He made 17 appearances that year, making it his most successful top tier season, but moved on again to join Real Oviedo in 2002. He suffered another relegation from the Segunda División in his only season with the Asturian club, before moving to the third tier with Hércules in 2003. He finished his career on a high note, earning promotion with Hércules as Segunda División B runners-up in 2004–05. He retired in 2005 at the age of 33.

== Honours ==
Gimnàstic de Tarragona

- Segunda División B: 1996–97

Lleida

- Copa Catalunya: Runner-up 1998–99

Hércules

- Segunda División B: Runner-up (earning promotion) 2004–05
