= Alberto Benito (footballer, born 1972) =

Spanish footballer

Personal information
- Full name: Alberto Benito Castañeda
- Date of birth: 17 June 1972 (age 54)
- Place of birth: Madrid, Spain
- Height: 1.77 m (5 ft 9 1/2 in)
- Position: Midfielder

Youth career
- 1990–1991: Real Madrid

Senior career*
Years	Team	Apps	(Gls)
1991–1992	Pegaso		
1992–1994	Valencia B	25	(9)
1994	Valencia	5	(0)
1994–1999	Toledo	117	(13)
1999–2002	Cádiz	86	(6)
Total		236	(28)

International career
1991	Spain U19	3	(0)
1991	Spain U20	1	(0)
- * Club domestic league appearances and goals

Alberto Benito Castañeda (born 17 June 1972) is a Spanish retired footballer who played as a central midfielder and is currently part of the recruitment team for Aston Villa.

== Club career ==
Born in Madrid, Benito made his senior debuts with Galáctico Pegaso in Tercera División, after graduating with Real Madrid's youth setup. In the 1992, summer he joined Valencia, being assigned to the reserves in Segunda División B.

On 23 January 1994, Benito made his first team – and La Liga – debut, coming on as a second-half substitute in a 2–2 home draw against Real Oviedo. In July 1994, he moved to Segunda División side Toledo, being a regular starter during his spell at the Castile-La Mancha side.

In January 1999, Benito signed for Cádiz in the third level, retiring with the side in 2002, aged only 29.

== International career ==
Benito represented Spain at the 1991 FIFA World Youth Championship in Portugal, playing only one match in an eventual quarter-final exit.

== Post-playing career ==
Immediately after retiring Benito joined the Andalusians' staff, being a technical secretary at the club. On 26 June 2007, he left the club and joined neighbouring Almería, being named director of football.

On 9 June 2014, Benito left the latter, returning to the role roughly a year later.

Benito has worked with former Toledo teammate Unai Emery, with whom he shared a room when they were players, as part of the scouting and recruitment teams at Paris Saint-Germain and Arsenal. He also spent time working for Granada, Parma and Swansea City.

In May 2023, Benito rejoined Emery at Aston Villa, working alongside the Head of Recruitment, as part of the club's global recruitment network.

== Personal life ==
Benito's son Pedro is also a footballer. A forward, he supports Cádiz CF and plays for Real Murcia.
