= Quique Medina =

Spanish footballer and coach

Personal information
- Full name: Enrique Juan Medina Rodríguez
- Date of birth: 25 September 1967 (age 59)
- Place of birth: Santa Cruz de Tenerife, Spain
- Position: Defender

Youth career
- Tenerife

Senior career*
Years	Team	Apps	(Gls)
1984–1991	Tenerife	182	(3)
1991–1992	Sabadell	15	(0)
1992–1993	Granada	7	(1)
1993–1995	Hércules	49	(2)
1995–1997	Atlético Marbella	18	(1)
Total		271	(7)

International career
1985	Spain U18	3	(0)

Managerial career
- 2000–2002: Hércules (assistant)
- 2001: Hércules (interim)
- 2003: Hércules B
- 2003–2004: Laguna
- 2005–2006: Tenerife (assistant)
- 2005: Tenerife (interim)
- 2010–2011: Tenerife (assistant)
- 2011–2012: Tenerife B
- 2012: Tenerife
- * Club domestic league appearances and goals

Enrique "Quique" Juan Medina Rodríguez (born 25 September 1967) is a Spanish retired footballer who played as a defender, and is a current coach.

== Club career ==
Born in Santa Cruz de Tenerife, Canary Islands, Medina was promoted to CD Tenerife's main squad in 1984, aged only 16. He made his professional debut on 9 September, playing the full 90 minutes in a 2–2 away draw against Deportivo de La Coruña in the Segunda División.

Medina scored his first goal on 13 October 1985, netting the first in a 1–1 home draw against Deportivo Aragón. He was also an undisputed starter during the 1988–89 campaign, appearing in 35 matches and scoring once as his side returned to La Liga after a 29-year absence.

Medina made his debut in the main category of Spanish football on 3 September 1989, starting in a 0–1 away loss against Sevilla FC. After appearing sparingly in 1990–91, he left the Blanquiazules and joined CE Sabadell FC in the second level.

In 1993, after a single season at Granada CF of the Segunda División B, Medina moved to Hércules CF in the second division. After two campaigns appearing regularly he signed for fellow league team CA Marbella; he subsequently retired with the latter in 1997, after suffering relegation in the previous year.

== Coaching career ==
In 2000 Medina returned to Hércules, being appointed assistant manager. In March 2002, he was appointed interim manager of the club, being in charge for one match and subsequently returning to his previous duties.

In 2003 Medina was also manager of the Valencians' reserve team, being later appointed at the helm of AD Laguna. In 2005, he returned to his first club Tenerife as an assistant manager, but in November 2005 was named again interim.

Medina left the club in 2006, and was a director of football at Laguna during the 2008–09 campaign. On 28 June 2011 he was named CD Tenerife B manager, being appointed at the helm of the main squad on 9 April of the following year, replacing fired Andrés García Tébar.

After missing out promotion in the play-offs, Medina was named director of football of the club. On 9 June 2014, he rescinded his contract, but returned to the club on 14 August 2019.
