= Fernando Giner =

Spanish footballer

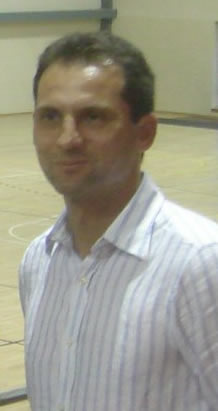

Personal information
- Full name: Fernando Giner Gil
- Date of birth: 31 December 1964 (age 61)
- Place of birth: Alboraya, Spain
- Height: 1.82 m (6 ft 0 in)
- Position: Centre-back

Youth career
- Valencia

Senior career*
Years	Team	Apps	(Gls)
1982–1985	Mestalla		
1982–1995	Valencia	300	(12)
1995–1997	Sporting Gijón	46	(0)
1997–1998	Hércules	25	(0)
1998–2000	Levante	55	(1)
Total		426+	(13+)

International career
1982–1983	Spain U18	2	(0)
1986	Spain U21	1	(0)
1991–1993	Spain	11	(0)

Managerial career
- 2000–2001: Levante (assistant)
- 2006–2007: Olímpic Xàtiva
- 2008–2009: Castellón B
- * Club domestic league appearances and goals

Fernando Giner Gil (born 31 December 1964) is a Spanish former professional footballer who played as a central defender.

== Honours ==
Valencia

- Segunda División: 1986–87

Levante

- Segunda División B: 1998–99

Spain U21

- UEFA European Under-21 Championship: 1986
