= Paco Camarasa =

Spanish footballer (born 1967)

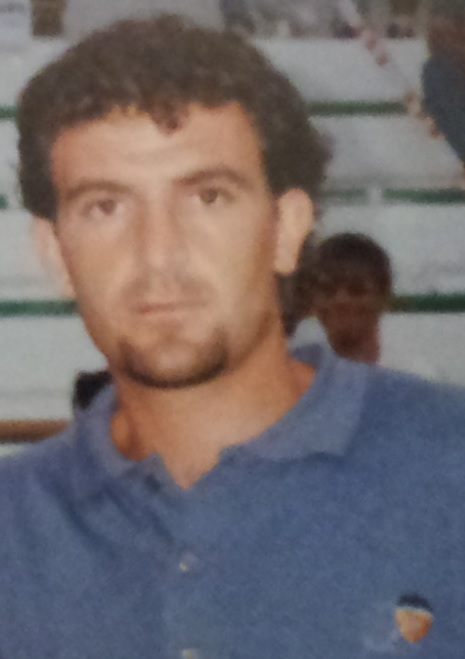
- Camarasa in 1995

Personal information
- Full name: Francisco José Camarasa Castellar
- Date of birth: 27 September 1967 (age 59)
- Place of birth: Rafelbunyol, Spain
- Height: 1.83 m (6 ft 0 in)
- Position: Centre-back

Youth career
- 1980–1985: Valencia

Senior career*
Years	Team	Apps	(Gls)
1985–1988	Valencia B		
1988–2000	Valencia	266	(7)
2000	Valencia B	19	(2)

International career
1993–1995	Spain	14	(0)

Managerial career
- 2007: Valencia B
- * Club domestic league appearances and goals

Francisco 'Paco' José Camarasa Castellar (born 27 September 1967) is a Spanish former professional footballer who played mainly as a central defender.

== Club career ==
Camarasa was born in Rafelbunyol, Valencian Community. He played solely with local club Valencia CF in a 15-year senior career, making his first-team debut during the 1987–88 season (one game, as the Che had just returned from the Segunda División). Eventually, he became an undisputed starter, totalling 333 competitive appearances.

Towards the end of his spell, injuries and loss of form limited Camarasa to just 11 La Liga matches over four campaigns. He played a minor part in Valencia's 1999 conquest of the Copa del Rey, retiring in June of the following year at the age of 32.

Subsequently, Camarasa remained working at the Mestalla Stadium as a match delegate. In March 2020, he was one of five persons connected to the organisation that tested positive for COVID-19 during the pandemic in Spain.

== International career ==
Camarasa earned 14 caps for Spain and was in the squad for the 1994 FIFA World Cup, featuring 13 minutes against Germany in the group stage after coming on as a substitute for Pep Guardiola and playing the entire 3–0 round-of-16 win over Switzerland.

== Honours ==
Valencia

- Copa del Rey: 1998–99
- UEFA Intertoto Cup: 1998

== See also ==
- List of one-club men
