= Pepe Gálvez =

Spanish footballer

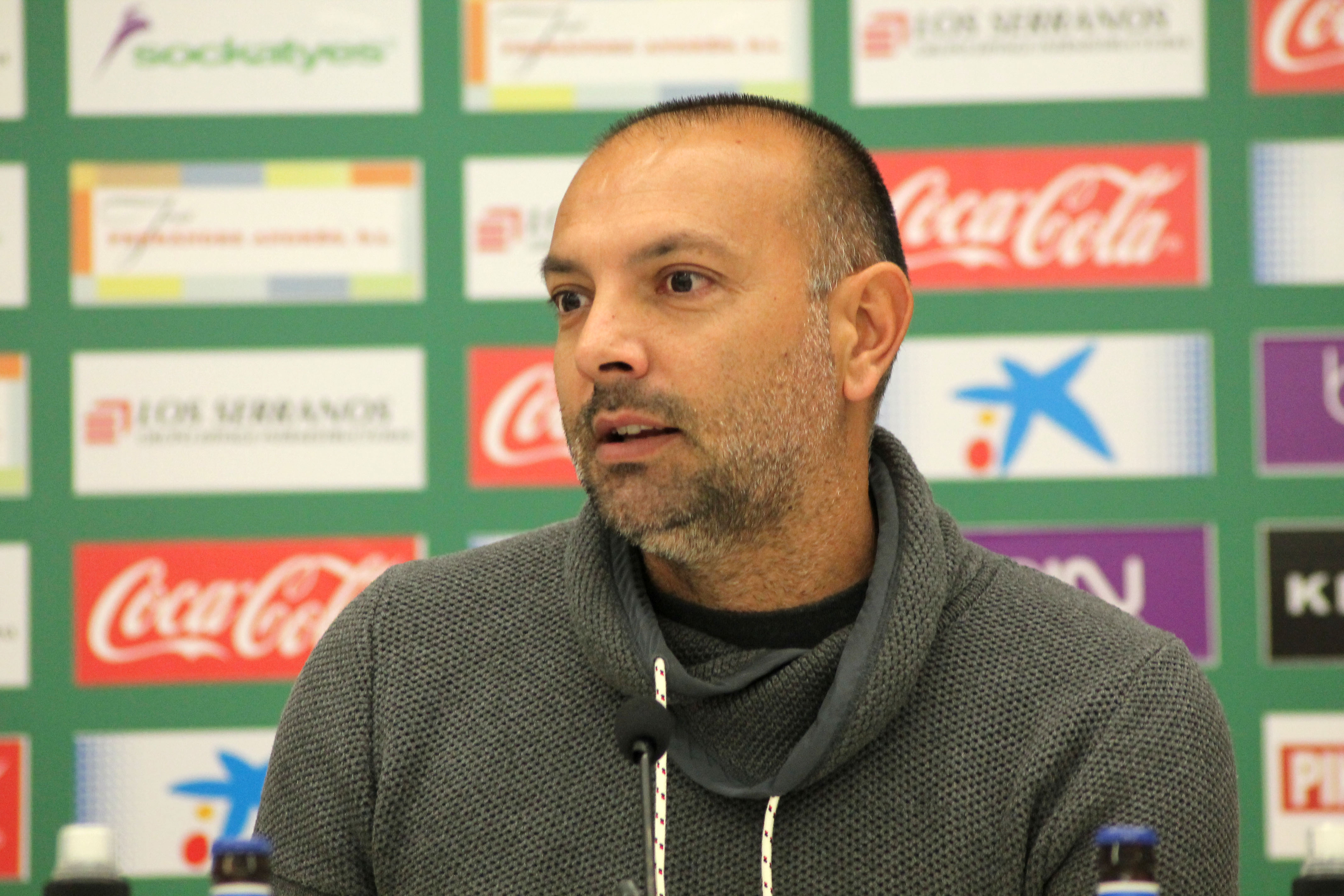
- Gálvez as manager of Mallorca in 2016

Personal information
- Full name: José Gálvez Estévez
- Date of birth: 3 August 1974 (age 52)
- Place of birth: Calvià, Spain
- Height: 1.80 m (5 ft 11 in)
- Position: Forward

Youth career
- Mallorca

Senior career*
Years	Team	Apps	(Gls)
1991	Mallorca B	7	(2)
1991–1993	Mallorca	59	(18)
1993–1998	Valencia	88	(20)
1997–1998	→ Mallorca (loan)	32	(5)
1998–2002	Betis	58	(9)
2001–2002	→ Burgos (loan)	26	(2)
2002	Platges de Calvià		
2003	Calvià		
Total		270	(56)

International career
1991	Spain U17	3	(1)
1991–1993	Spain U18	11	(7)
1993–1995	Spain U21	15	(7)

Managerial career
- 2005–2008: Calvià (youth)
- 2009–2010: Balearic U18
- 2015–2016: Mallorca
- 2016–2018: Mallorca B
Medal record
Men's football
Representing Spain
UEFA European Under-21 Championship
Bronze medal – third place	1994 France
FIFA World U-17
Runner-up	1991 Switzerland
- * Club domestic league appearances and goals

José "Pepe" Gálvez Estévez (born 3 August 1974 in Calvià, Majorca, Balearic Islands) is a Spanish retired footballer who played as a forward, and is a manager.

He amassed La Liga totals of 177 matches and 34 goals during eight seasons, in representation of Mallorca (two spells), Valencia and Betis. He later worked with the first club as a manager.

== Club career ==
At the age of only 17, Gálvez became RCD Mallorca's youngest player ever to appear in a La Liga match, his first chance being awarded by manager Lorenzo Serra Ferrer. With three goals in 22 games from the player, the Balearic Islands club would eventually suffer top flight relegation in 1992.

After a solid 1992–93 season, even though Mallorca failed to regain their lost status, Gálvez was bought by Valencia CF, where he would be used intermittently. In his third year, as the latter finished in second position four points behind champions Atlético Madrid, he scored 11 goals in 28 matches (27 starts), only being surpassed in the squad by Serb Predrag Mijatović's 28.

Injury prevented Gálvez from taking part in the 1996 Summer Olympics tournament, and he could never reproduce his previous form in the following campaigns, with Valencia also loaning him to Mallorca for one and a half years. In 1998 he signed for Real Betis, being relegated from the top division in 2000 and immediately promoting back, but only netting four times combined for the Andalusians during this timeframe.

After one season in Segunda División with Burgos CF, ending in relegation, Gálvez retired from professional football at only 27, playing one more year in amateur football in his native region.

Gálvez served as assistant manager to Albert Ferrer at Mallorca, and took over the team on an interim basis on 30 November 2015 when the former Spanish international was sacked with the team in the second division's relegation zone. Six days later on his professional managerial debut, he led the team to a 2–0 home win over Albacete Balompié; this was his one win in six outings before the permanent appointment of Fernando Vázquez on 18 January.

In December 2016, Gálvez was hired at RCD Mallorca B in Segunda División B, taking over a club that was a candidate for promotion. The team were instead relegated to Tercera División because of the fate of the first team, and he left at the end of his contract in June 2018.

== Managerial statistics ==
As of 9 June 2018

Managerial record by team and tenure
Team	Nat	From	To	Record								Ref
Team	Nat	From	To	G	W	D	L	GF	GA	GD	Win %	Ref
Mallorca	(Spain)	30 November 2015	17 January 2016	6	1	2	3	6	8	−2	16.67	
Mallorca B	(Spain)	6 December 2016	25 June 2018	63	38	11	14	113	51	+62	60.32	
Total				69	39	13	17	119	59	+60	56.52	—

== Honours ==
Spain U17

- FIFA U-17 World Cup: Runner-up 1991

Spain U21

- UEFA European Under-21 Championship: Third-place 1994
