= José Manuel Sempere =

Spanish footballer

Personal information
- Full name: José Manuel Sempere Maciá
- Date of birth: 15 February 1958 (age 68)
- Place of birth: Torrellano, Spain
- Height: 1.77 m (5 ft 9 1/2 in)
- Position: Goalkeeper

Youth career
- CD Orihuela
- Valencia

Senior career*
| Years | Team | Apps | (Gls) |
| 1977–1979 | Mestalla | | |
| 1979–1995 | Valencia | 301 | (0) |
| 1979–1980 | → Español (loan) | 0 | (0) |

International career
| 1982 | Spain U23 | 1 | (0) |
| 1981 | Spain B | 1 | (0) |
- * Club domestic league appearances and goals

José Manuel Sempere Maciá (born 15 February 1958) is a Spanish former professional footballer who played as a goalkeeper.

== Club career ==
Born in Torrellano, Province of Alicante, Valencian Community, Sempere finished his youth career with local giants Valencia CF, making his senior debut with RCD Español on loan (no official appearances). Returned to the Che in the summer of 1980, one of his first games was the season's UEFA Super Cup second leg, with the side winning the competition against Nottingham Forest and him being the youngest ever goalkeeper to achieve this feat, a record broken 22 years later by Iker Casillas of Real Madrid.

For 14 of his 15 seasons with his main club, Sempere alternated between first and second-choice, battling for starting duties with the likes of José Ramón Bermell and José Manuel Ochotorena. From 1991 to 1994, he totalled a further La Liga 104 appearances as his team finished twice in the top four, but was again relegated to the bench for the 1994–95 campaign following the arrival of Andoni Zubizarreta from FC Barcelona, retiring in June 1995 at the age of 37.

== International career ==
Sempere was part of Spain's squad at the 1977 FIFA World Youth Championship, but played no games in Tunisia.

== Honours ==
Valencia

- UEFA Super Cup: 1980
- Segunda División: 1986–87
