= Fernando Gómez (footballer, born 1965) =

Spanish footballer

Fernando
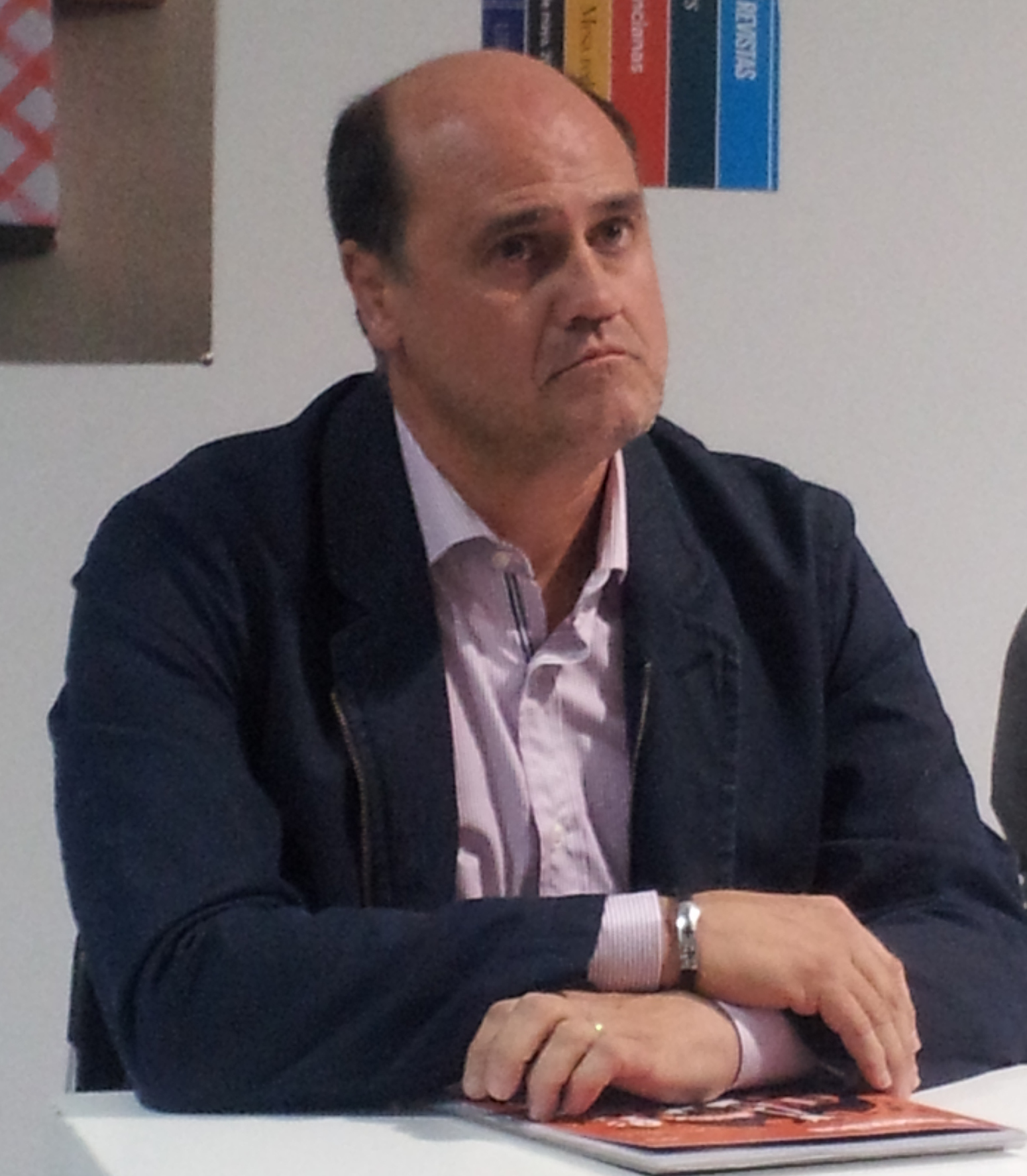
- Fernando in 2016

Personal information
- Full name: Fernando Gómez Colomer
- Date of birth: 11 September 1965 (age 61)
- Place of birth: Valencia, Spain
- Height: 1.78 m (5 ft 10 in)
- Position: Attacking midfielder

Youth career
- Colegio Salgui
- 1980–1983: Valencia

Senior career*
Years	Team	Apps	(Gls)
1983	Valencia B		
1983–1998	Valencia	458	(117)
1998–1999	Wolverhampton Wanderers	19	(2)
1999–2000	Castellón	35	(10)
Total		512	(129)

International career
1983–1984	Spain U18	12	(1)
1985	Spain U19	1	(1)
1985	Spain U20	6	(3)
1985–1990	Spain U21	9	(0)
1989–1992	Spain	8	(2)

Managerial career
- 2016: Torre Levante
- 2017–2018: Alzira
- 2020–2021: Benigànim
- * Club domestic league appearances and goals

Fernando Gómez Colomer (born 11 September 1965), known simply as Fernando, is a Spanish former professional footballer who played as an attacking midfielder.

His career was closely connected to Valencia with whom he made his La Liga debut at the age of 18, going on to make a record 556 appearances and score 142 official goals. He worked with the club in directorial capacities following his retirement.

Fernando represented Spain at the 1990 World Cup.

== Club career ==
Born in Valencia, Fernando spent the vast majority of his career at his hometown side, representing them for 15 seasons as a senior. He would garner a reputation as an outstanding playmaker who boasted an exceptional scoring record from midfield (he scored 14 league goals twice, ten three times), also being team captain; he played a club-record 420 La Liga matches, and also ranked as the fourth-highest scorer with 142 goals in all competitions.

Fernando made his debut with the main squad on 15 January 1984 in a 2–1 away loss against Real Valladolid, after moving up from the reserves. He truly came to the forefront in 1986–87 as the team won promotion back from Segunda División at the first attempt; aside from this campaign, he spent all of his spell with Valencia in the top flight, where he twice finished second in the championship, also helping to a runner-up finish in the Copa del Rey of 1995.

Fernando won Don Balón's Best Spanish Player Award for 1988–89, and broke into the Spanish national team later that year. He finally left the Mestalla Stadium in August 1998, to join English First Division side Wolverhampton Wanderers on a free transfer. In his one season at Molineux Stadium, partnering club icon Steve Bull and young prospect Robbie Keane, he scored twice: a left-foot volley against Stockport County in a 2–2 home draw at the end of his first month, and an early winner in the 2–1 victory at Tranmere Rovers in his penultimate game in January.

Fernando then signed with Segunda División B's Castellón, also in the Valencian Community. After another single season, he retired in 2000 at the age of 34. He remained at the club as director of football, switching afterwards to sports commentator on both radio and television. In July 2008, however, he returned to Valencia again as sporting director, leaving the post two years later.

Fernando began managing already in his 50s, at Torre Levante in the Tercera División. He resigned in September 2016 with the team in eighth, calling the situation "unsustainable". The following July, he joined Alzira in the same league, and received a one-year extension in June 2018.

A seven-game winless run ending with four straight defeats saw Fernando dismissed in November 2018. After a season at Benigànim, another local amateur side, he became sporting director at Castellón in June 2021.

== International career ==
Fernando earned eight caps and scored two goals for Spain, making his international debut on 15 November 1989 in a 4–0 win against Hungary for the 1990 FIFA World Cup qualifiers, closing the score in Seville. He was subsequently selected for the squad that competed in the finals in Italy, where he made a substitute appearance in the 3–1 group stage victory over South Korea.

Fernando had earlier represented the nation at youth level in the 1985 FIFA World Youth Championship, finishing joint-top scorer with three goals en route to the final.

== Personal life ==
Fernando's father was head of a university department, while his brothers became a law professor and a doctor, respectively. His sons followed him into football, but did not turn professional. For his studious background, he was nicknamed "El Catedrático" (The Professor).

In April 2011, Fernando was recruited by the People's Party in Chiva, Valencia to run as number 3 on their list for the local elections. After serving one term as the councillor in charge of sports, he did not run for re-election in 2015.

== Honours ==
Valencia

- Segunda División: 1986–87
- Copa del Rey runner-up: 1994–95

Spain U20

- FIFA U-20 World Cup runner-up: 1985

== See also ==
- List of La Liga players (400+ appearances)
- List of Valencia CF players (+100 appearances)
