= Pepe Serer =

Spanish footballer and manager

Personal information
- Full name: José Pérez Serer
- Date of birth: 5 April 1966 (age 60)
- Place of birth: Quart de les Valls, Spain
- Position: Centre-back

Senior career*
Years	Team	Apps	(Gls)
1987–1989	Barcelona B	64	(4)
1988–1989	Barcelona	1	(0)
1989–1993	Mallorca	100	(1)
1993–1995	Valencia	36	(0)
1995–2000	Villarreal	67	(0)
1999–2000	Valencia B	7	(1)
Total		275	(6)

Managerial career
- 2012: Kairat Almaty
- 2013–2015: Celta (assistant)
- 2015–: Granada CF (assistant)
- * Club domestic league appearances and goals

José "Pepe" Pérez Serer (born 4 May 1966) is a Spanish football manager and former player. He has managed Kazakh club Kairat.

== Managerial statistics ==
As of 29 April 2013

Team	Nat	Managerial Tenure	P	W	D	L	Win %
Kairat	Kazakhstan	June 2012 – November 2012	16	4	5	7	25

== Honours ==
Barcelona

- UEFA Cup Winners' Cup: 1988–89
