= Robert Fernández (footballer) =

Spanish footballer

Personal information
- Full name: Roberto Fernández Bonillo
- Date of birth: 5 July 1962 (age 64)
- Place of birth: Betxí, Spain
- Height: 1.79 m (5 ft 10 in)
- Position: Central midfielder

Youth career
- 1974–1978: Villarreal

Senior career*
Years	Team	Apps	(Gls)
1978–1979	Villarreal		
1979–1981	Castellón	63	(8)
1981–1986	Valencia	135	(36)
1986–1990	Barcelona	144	(35)
1990–1995	Valencia	123	(22)
1995–1999	Villarreal	142	(8)
1999–2001	Córdoba	67	(0)
Total		674	(109)

International career
1979–1980	Spain U18	10	(1)
1981	Spain U19	3	(0)
1980–1988	Spain U21	21	(7)
1982	Spain U23	1	(0)
1983	Spain amateur	2	(0)
1982–1991	Spain	29	(1)

Managerial career
- 2004: Valencia B
- 2004: Córdoba
- 2006–2007: Orihuela
- 2008–2009: Alzira
Medal record
Representing Spain
UEFA European Championship
Runner-up	1984 France
- * Club domestic league appearances and goals

Roberto 'Robert' Fernández Bonillo (born 5 July 1962) is a Spanish former professional footballer who played mostly as a central midfielder.

From 1981 and during the next 14 years, he played with Valencia and Barcelona, going on to amass La Liga totals of 439 matches and 95 goals over 15 seasons. He also had two spells at Villarreal, where he started his career.

Fernández represented the Spain national team for nearly one decade, appearing at one World Cup and one European Championship.

== Club career ==
Born in Betxí, Province of Castellón, Fernández started playing professionally with CD Castellón in 1979 after emerging through the ranks of neighbours Villarreal CF. Two years later, he moved to another club in the community, Valencia CF, proceeding to total 33 La Liga goals in his first four seasons but suffering relegation in 1986.

Fernández signed for FC Barcelona in the summer of 1986. He scored ten times in 40 matches in his debut campaign, including a penalty in a 2–1 home win against Real Madrid, who won that year's league ahead of the Catalans.

Having been essential as Barça won two vice-championships, two Copa del Rey trophies and the 1988–89 European Cup Winners' Cup, Fernández returned to Valencia in 1990. He helped the latter to two consecutive fourth-place finishes, and spent almost the entire 1993–94 on the sidelines due to injury.

For the 1995–96 season, Fernández re-joined another familiar team, Villarreal who now competed in the Segunda División. He scored once in 36 appearances in his third year to help them to achieve a first-ever promotion, being immediately relegated afterwards. He retired in 2001 at the age of 39, after two seasons in the second tier with Córdoba CF.

Subsequently, after more than 700 official games, Fernández moved into coaching, being in charge of lowly Valencia B, Orihuela CF and UD Alzira in his native region. In the 2004–05 campaign he was one of four managers for Córdoba, who finished in 19th position and dropped down to Segunda División B.

Fernández returned to Barcelona in the summer of 2015, in directorial capacities. He left in June 2018 after his contract expired, being replaced by Eric Abidal who also played for the club.

== International career ==
Fernández earned 29 caps and scored one goal for Spain in nine years, and was included in the squad for the UEFA Euro 1984 and the 1990 FIFA World Cup tournaments. His debut came during the former's qualifying stage, in a 1–0 home win over Iceland on 27 October 1982 in which he played the full 90 minutes.

=== International goals ===
Scores and results list Spain's goal tally first.

No.	Date	Venue	Opponent	Score	Result	Competition
1	14 November 1990	Strahov Stadium, Prague, Czechoslovakia	Czechoslovakia	1–1	2–3	UEFA Euro 1992 qualifying

== Honours ==
Castellón

- Segunda División: 1980–81

Barcelona

- Copa del Rey: 1987–88, 1989–90
- UEFA Cup Winners' Cup: 1988–89

Spain U21

- UEFA European Under-21 Championship: 1986; runner-up: 1984

== See also ==
- List of FC Barcelona players (100+ appearances)
- List of La Liga players (400+ appearances)
- List of Valencia CF players (+100 appearances)
