= 1990–91 FC Barcelona season =

92nd season in existence of FC Barcelona

Barcelona
1990–91 season
- President: Josep Lluís Núñez
- Head Coach: Johan Cruyff (until 26 February); Carles Rexach (until 6 April); Johan Cruyff
- Stadium: Camp Nou
- La Liga: 1st
- Copa del Rey: Semi-finals
- Supercopa de España: Runners-up
- UEFA Cup Winners' Cup: Runners-up
- Top goalscorer: League: Hristo Stoichkov (14); All: Hristo Stoichkov (22)
Home colours	Away colours

The 1990–91 season was Barcelona's 92nd season in existence and the club's 60th consecutive season in the top flight of Spanish football.

== Squad ==
Note: Flags indicate national team as defined under FIFA eligibility rules; some limited exceptions apply. Players may hold more than one non-FIFA nationality.

No.	Pos.	Nation	Player
—	GK	ESP	Andoni Zubizarreta
—	GK	ESP	Carles Busquets
—	GK	ESP	Jesús Angoy
—	DF	ESP	Albert Ferrer
—	DF	ESP	José Ramón Alexanko (captain)
—	DF	ESP	Julio Alberto
—	DF	NED	Ronald Koeman
—	DF	ESP	Ricardo Serna
—	DF	ESP	Álex
—	DF	ESP	Nando
—	DF	ESP	Sebastián Herrera
—	DF	ESP	Lluís Carreras
—	DF	ESP	Sergi
—	DF	ESP	Miquel Soler
—	DF	ESP	Luis López Rekarte
—	MF	ESP	Guillermo Amor

No.	Pos.	Nation	Player
—	MF	ESP	José Mari Bakero
—	MF	ESP	Eusebio
—	MF	ESP	Pep Guardiola
—	MF	ESP	Sánchez Jara
—	MF	ESP	Urbano
—	FW	ESP	Pablo Maqueda
—	FW	ESP	Paco Clos
—	FW	ESP	Txiki Begiristain
—	FW	ESP	Ion Andoni Goikoetxea
—	FW	ESP	Julio Salinas
—	FW	DEN	Michael Laudrup
—	FW	ESP	Antonio Pinilla
—	FW	BUL	Hristo Stoichkov

=== Transfers ===
In
Pos.	Name	from	Type
FW	Hristo Stoichkov	CSKA Sofia	
DF	Albert Ferrer	Tenerife	
DF	Nando	Sevilla	
GK	Jesus Angoy	Logroñés	loan ended
FW	Ion Andoni Goikoetxea	Real Sociedad	loan ended

Out
Pos.	Name	To	Type
MF	Luis Milla	Real Madrid	
DF	Aloísio	Porto	
FW	Juan Carlos Unzué	Sevilla	
MF	Ernesto Valverde	Athletic Bilbao	

== Competitions ==
=== La Liga ===
==== League table ====
Pos	Team	Pld	W	D	L	GF	GA	GD	Pts	Qualification or relegation
1	Barcelona (C)	38	25	7	6	74	33	+41	57	Qualification for the European Cup first round
2	Atlético Madrid	38	17	13	8	52	28	+24	47	Qualification for the Cup Winners' Cup first round (Note: Atlético Madrid qualified for the European Cup Winners' Cup as champions of the Copa del Rey.)
3	Real Madrid	38	20	6	12	63	37	+26	46	Qualification for the UEFA Cup first round
4	Osasuna	38	15	15	8	43	34	+9	45	Qualification for the UEFA Cup first round
5	Sporting Gijón	38	16	12	10	50	37	+13	44	Qualification for the UEFA Cup first round

Source: BDFútbol
Rules for classification: 1) Points; 2) Head-to-head results; 3) Goal difference; 4) Number of goals scored
(C) Champions

==== Results by round ====
Round	1	2	3	4	5	6	7	8	9	10	11	12	13	14	15	16	17	18	19	20	21	22	23	24	25	26	27	28	29	30	31	32	33	34	35	36	37	38
Ground	A	H	A	H	A	H	A	H	A	H	H	A	H	A	H	A	H	A	H	H	A	H	A	H	A	H	A	H	A	H	A	A	H	A	H	A	H	A
Result	W	W	W	W	W	W	D	W	L	D	W	W	W	W	W	D	W	L	W	W	W	W	W	W	W	W	L	D	W	W	W	D	W	L	L	W	D	L
Position	5	1	1	1	1	1	1	1	1	1	1	1	1	1	1	1	1	1	1	1	1	1	1	1	1	1	1	1	1	1	1	1	1	1	1	1	1	1

Source: Competitive matches
A = Away; H = Home; W = Win; D = Draw; L = Loss; = Leader, 1991–92 European Cup; = 1991–92 UEFA Cup

==== Matches ====
1 September 1990 1	Espanyol	0–1	Barcelona	Barcelona
		Report	Stoichkov 42'	Stadium: Sarrià

9 September 1990 2	Barcelona	3–1	Valencia	Barcelona
	Koeman 31'; Stoichkov 57'; Bakero 79'	Report	Giner 65'	Stadium: Camp Nou

15 September 1990 3	Real Betis	2–3	Barcelona	Seville
	Valentín 77'; Pepe Mel 79'	Report	Begiristain 9'; Stoichkov 27'; Koeman 45'	Stadium: Estadio Benito Villamarin

23 September 1990 4	Barcelona	1–0	Real Valladolid	Barcelona
	Salinas 8'	Report		Stadium: Camp Nou

30 September 1990 5	Tenerife	0–1	Barcelona	Santa Cruz de Tenerife
		Report	Salinas 33'	Stadium: Heliodoro Rodríguez López

6 October 1990 6	Barcelona	4–1	Athletic Bilbao	Barcelona
	Salinas 25' (o.g.); Bakero 50'; Laudrup 61' 63'	Report	Valverde 34'	Stadium: Camp Nou

13 October 1990 7	Osasuna	0–0	Barcelona	Pamplona
		Report		Stadium: El Sadar

20 October 1990 8	Barcelona	3–2	Sporting Gijón	Barcelona
	Amor 9' 50'; Koeman 54' (pen.)	Report	Óscar 1'; Luis Enrique 47'	Stadium: Camp Nou

27 October 1990 9	Atlético Madrid	2–1	Barcelona	Madrid
	Schuster 53'; Futre 69'	Report	Stoichkov 55'	Stadium: Estadio Vicente Calderón

3 November 1990 10	Barcelona	0–0	Real Burgos	Barcelona
		Report		Stadium: Camp Nou

18 November 1990 11	Barcelona	6–0	Castellón	Barcelona
	Eusebio 15'; Stoichkov 25' 43' 45'; Bakero 75'; Salinas 87'	Report		Stadium: Camp Nou

24 November 1990 12	Sevilla	0–1	Barcelona	Seville
		Report	Alexanko 79'	Stadium: Sánchez Pizjuán

2 December 1990 13	Barcelona	2–1	Mallorca	Barcelona
	Eusebio 19'; Goikoetxea 57'	Report	Barragán 71'	Stadium: Camp Nou

9 December 1990 14	Real Zaragoza	0–2	Barcelona	Zaragoza
		Report	Bakero 28'; Amor 89'	Stadium: La Romareda

16 December 1990 15	Barcelona	2–0	Cádiz	Barcelona
	Begiristain 14'; Bakero 74'	Report		Stadium: Camp Nou

30 December 1990 16	Real Sociedad	1–1	Barcelona	San Sebastián
	Atkinson 51'	Report	Begiristain 52'	Stadium: Atotxa

6 January 1991 17	Barcelona	2–1	Logroñés	Barcelona
	Alexanko 72'; Bakero 78'	Report	Quique Setién 47'	Stadium: Camp Nou

13 January 1991 18	Real Oviedo	1–0	Barcelona	Oviedo
	Bango 5'	Report		Stadium: Carlos Tartiere

19 January 1991 19	Barcelona	2–1	Real Madrid	Barcelona
	Laudrup 18'; Spasić 62' (o.g.)	Report	Butragueño 28'	Stadium: Camp Nou

27 January 1991 20	Barcelona	5–2	Espanyol	Barcelona
	Laudrup 32' (pen.) 72' (pen.); Bakero 48' 53'; Salinas 70'	Report	Mendiondo 37'; Àlex Garcia 82'	Stadium: Camp Nou

2 February 1991 21	Valencia	2–2	Barcelona	Valencia
	Roberto 34'; Penev 50' (pen.)	Report	Laudrup 39'; Pinilla 68'	Stadium: Mestalla

10 February 1991 22	Barcelona	4–2	Real Betis	Barcelona
	Laudrup 20'; Bakero 41' 50'; Salinas 66'	Report	Ivanov 53' (pen.) 81' (pen.)	Stadium: Camp Nou

24 February 1991 23	Real Valladolid	1–5	Barcelona	Valladolid
	Onésimo 29'	Report	Salinas 37' 77'; Begiristain 43' 46' 53'	Stadium: José Zorrilla

2 March 1991 24	Barcelona	1–0	Tenerife	Barcelona
	Stoichkov 27' (pen.)	Report		Stadium: Camp Nou

10 March 1991 25	Athletic Bilbao	0–6	Barcelona	Bilbao
		Report	Stoichkov 1' 6' 37' 73' (pen.); Bakero 58'; Salinas 64'	Stadium: San Mamés

16 March 1991 26	Barcelona	2–0	Osasuna	Barcelona
	Stoichkov 13'; Bakero 20'	Report		Stadium: Camp Nou

24 March 1991 27	Sporting Gijón	1–0	Barcelona	Gijón
	Luis Enrique 32'	Report		Stadium: El Molinón

30 March 1991 28	Barcelona	1–1	Atlético Madrid	Barcelona
	Salinas 57'	Report	Vizcaíno 65'	Stadium: Camp Nou

6 April 1991 29	Real Burgos	1–3	Barcelona	Burgos
	Balint 12'	Report	Stoichkov 4'; Koeman 15' (pen.); Bakero 32'	Stadium: El Plantío

14 April 1991 30	Castellón	0–1	Barcelona	Castellón de la Plana
		Report	Koeman 78' (pen.)	Stadium: Castàlia

20 April 1991 31	Barcelona	3–0	Sevilla	Barcelona
	Goikoetxea 3'; Amor 52'; Miquel Soler 57'	Report		Stadium: Camp Nou

27 April 1991 32	Mallorca	1–1	Barcelona	Palma
	Barragán 50'	Report	Goikoetxea 59'	Stadium: Lluís Sitjar

5 May 1991 33	Barcelona	2–1	Real Zaragoza	Barcelona
	Koeman 23'; Salinas 43'	Report	Poyet 54'	Stadium: Camp Nou

11 May 1991 34	Cádiz	4–0	Barcelona	Cádiz
	Mejías 5' 47'; Quevado 19'; Oscar Dertycia 32'	Report		Stadium: Ramón de Carranza

18 May 1991 35	Barcelona	1–3	Real Sociedad	Barcelona
	Salinas 75'	Report	Atkinson 2'; Aldridge 39' 54'	Stadium: Camp Nou

26 May 1991 36	Logroñés	0–2	Barcelona	Logroño
		Report	López Pérez 27' (o.g.); Laudrup 68'	Stadium: Las Gaunas

2 June 1991 37	Barcelona	0–0	Real Oviedo	Barcelona
		Report		Stadium: Camp Nou

8 June 1991 38	Real Madrid	1–0	Barcelona	Madrid
	Aldana 47'	Report		Stadium: Santiago Bernabéu

=== Copa del Rey ===
Eightfinals

6 February 1991	Las Palmas	1–0	Barcelona	Las Palmas de Gran Canaria
				Stadium: Estadio Insular

27 February 1991	Barcelona	6–0	Las Palmas	Barcelona
				Stadium: Camp Nou

Quarterfinals

12 June 1991	Sevilla	0–4	Barcelona	Seville
				Stadium: Sánchez Pizjuán

15 June 1991	Barcelona	3–0	Sevilla	Barcelona
				Stadium: Camp Nou

Semifinals

20 June 1991	Barcelona	0–2	Atlético Madrid	Barcelona
				Stadium: Camp Nou

23 June 1991	Atlético Madrid	2–3	Barcelona	Madrid
				Stadium: Estadio Vicente Calderón

=== European Cup Winners' Cup ===
First round

19 September 1990	Trabzonspor (Turkey)	1–0	(Spain) Barcelona	Trabzon
	Aslan 67'			Stadium: Hüseyin Avni Aker

3 October 1990	Barcelona (Spain)	7–2	(Turkey) Trabzonspor	Barcelona
	Begiristain 13'; Amor 29'; Koeman 32', 40', 76' (pen.); Stoichkov 44', 87'		Hami 7'; Boz 68'	Stadium: Camp Nou

Eight-finals

23 October 1990	Fram (Iceland)	1–2	(Spain) Barcelona	Reykjavík
	Daðason 60'		Salinas 33'; Stoichkov 87'	Stadium: Laugardalsvöllur

7 November 1990	Barcelona (Spain)	3–0	(Iceland) Fram	Barcelona
	Eusebio 17'; Begiristain 34'; Pinilla 70'			Stadium: Camp Nou

Quarter-finals

6 March 1991	Dynamo Kyiv (Soviet Union)	2–3	(Spain) Barcelona	Kyiv
	Zayets 33'; Salenko 81' (pen.)		Bakero 5'; Urbano 45'; Stoichkov 63' (pen.)	Stadium: Republican Stadium

19 March 1991	Barcelona (Spain)	1–1	(Soviet Union) Dynamo Kyiv	Barcelona
	Amor 89'		Yuran 62'	Stadium: Camp Nou

Semi-finals

10 April 1991	Barcelona (Spain)	3–1	(Italy) Juventus	Barcelona
	Stoichkov 55', 60'; Goikoetxea 75'		Casiraghi 12'	Stadium: Camp Nou

24 April 1991	Juventus (Italy)	1–0	(Spain) Barcelona	Turin
	Baggio 60'			Stadium: Stadio Delle Alpi

==== Final ====
15 May 1991	Manchester United (England)	2–1	(Spain) Barcelona	Rotterdam
20:15 CEST	Hughes 67', 74'	Report	Koeman 79'	Stadium: Feijenoord Stadion; Attendance: 45,000; Referee: (Sweden) Bo Karlsson

=== Supercopa ===
5 December 1990	FC Barcelona	0–1	Real Madrid (Spain)	Barcelona
20:45 CET	Stoichkov (red card) 41'		54' Míchel	Stadium: Camp Nou; Attendance: 40,000; Referee: Ildefonso Urízar Azpitarte

12 December 1990	Real Madrid	4–1	FC Barcelona	Madrid
20:45 CET	Butragueño 22', 44'; Hugo Sánchez 56'; Aragón 70'		Goikoetxea 20'	Stadium: Santiago Bernabéu; Attendance: 70,000; Referee: Joaquín Urío Velázquez

=== Friendlies ===
GAMES 1990–1991

23-5-1991 COPA GENERALITAT BLANES-BARCELONA 0-6

30-5-1991 COPA GENERALITAT GERONA-BARCELONA 1-2

5-6-1991 COPA GENERALITAT SABADELL-BARCELONA 3-6

27-7-1990 FRIENDLY SELECT Japan Soccer League-BARCELONA 1-1

29-7-1990 FRIENDLY SELECT Japan Soccer League-BARCELONA 2-4

2-8-1990 FRIENDLY A.B.S-BARCELONA 0-12

4-8-1990 FRIENDLY HERACLES-BARCELONA 2-3

5-8-1990 FRIENDLY VV BEEKBERGEN-BARCELONA 0-10

8-8-1990 FRIENDLY SVV-BARCELONA 0-1

9-8-1990 FRIENDLY VALTHERMAND-BARCELONA 1-6

11-8-1990 FRIENDLY PSV EINDHOVEN-BARCELONA 2-2

16-8-1990 Teresa Herrera Trophy DEPORTIVO-BARCELONA 0-2

18-8-1990 Teresa Herrera Trophy BENFICA-BARCELONA 0-2

21-8-1990 Joan Gamper Trophy BARCELONA-SPARTAK MOSCOW 1-0

22-8-1990 Joan Gamper Trophy BARCELONA-ANDERLECHT 3-1

25-8-1990 Trofeo Ciudad de Valladolid VALLADOLID-BARCELONA 1-1 /9-10/ PENALTY

11-9-1990 TROFEO EL CORTE INGLES SABADELL-BARCELONA 1-1 /4-2/ PENALTY

14-2-1991 FRIENDLY AMPOSTA-BARCELONA 0-3

1-5-1991 Desafío Total Canal+ REAL MADRID-BARCELONA 3-1

21-5-1991 FRIENDLY BARCELONA-VILASSAR 10-0

== Statistics ==
=== Players statistics ===
No.	Pos	Nat	Player	Total		La Liga		Copa del Rey		Cup Winners' Cup	
No.	Pos	Nat	Player	Apps	Goals	Apps	Goals	Apps	Goals	Apps	Goals
	GK	(Spain) ESP	Zubizarreta	52	-33	38	-33	6	0	8	0
	DF	(Spain) ESP	Ferrer	38	0	23+3	0	5	0	7	0
	DF	(Netherlands) NED	Koeman	32	12	20+1	6	4	2	7	4
	DF	(Spain) ESP	Nando	45	0	34	0	5	0	6	0
	DF	(Spain) ESP	Serna	44	0	28+5	0	4	0	7	0
	MF	(Spain) ESP	Amor	43	7	34	4	1	1	8	2
	MF	(Spain) ESP	Bakero	44	15	34	13	4	1	6	1
	MF	(Spain) ESP	Goikoetxea	49	4	36+1	3	6	0	6	1
	MF	(Spain) ESP	Eusebio	46	6	30+2	2	6	3	8	1
	FW	(Denmark) DEN	Laudrup	42	10	29+1	8	5	2	7	0
	FW	(Spain) ESP	Begiristain	47	8	32+1	6	6	0	8	2
	GK	(Spain) ESP	Busquets	1	0	0	0	0	0	1	0
	FW	(Bulgaria) BUL	Stoichkov	37	22	23+1	14	5	2	8	6
	FW	(Spain) ESP	Salinas	45	16	21+12	11	4	4	8	1
	DF	(Spain) ESP	Alexanko	26	2	18+2	2	2	0	4	0
	DF	(Spain) ESP	Soler	34	1	11+15	1	3	0	5	0
	FW	(Spain) ESP	Pinilla	12	2	7	1	3	0	2	1
	MF	(Spain) ESP	Urbano	10	1	7	0	0	0	3	1
	DF	(Spain) ESP	Lopez Rekarte	19	0	1+12	0	2	0	4	0
	GK	(Spain) ESP	Angoy	0	0	0	0	0	0	0	0
	DF	(Spain) ESP	Carreras	0	0	0	0	0	0	0	0
	DF	(Spain) ESP	Álex	1	0	0	0	0	0	1	0
	MF	(Spain) ESP	Guardiola	6	0	4	0	2	0	0	0
	DF	(Spain) ESP	Sebastián Herrera	3	0	1	0	0	0	2	0
	DF	(Spain) ESP	Julio Alberto	5	0	3	0	2	0	0	0
	DF	(Spain) ESP	Sergi	2	0	0	0	2	0	0	0
	FW	(Spain) ESP	Maqueda	1	0	1	0	0	0	0	0
	MF	(Spain) ESP	Roura	1	0	0	0	1	0	0	0
