= 1991–92 FC Barcelona season =

93rd season in existence of Barcelona

Barcelona
1991–92 season
- President: Josep Lluís Núñez
- Head coach: Johan Cruyff
- Stadium: Camp Nou
- La Liga: 1st
- Copa del Rey: Round of 16
- Supercopa de España: Winners
- European Cup: Winners
- Top goalscorer: League: Hristo Stoichkov (17); All: Hristo Stoichkov (22)
Home colours	Away colours

The 1991–92 season was the 93rd season for Barcelona.

== Summary ==
The season is best remembered for the club's first-ever European Cup triumph, beating Sampdoria at Wembley with a score of 1–0 after extra time through a free-kick goal by Ronald Koeman.

In La Liga, Barcelona had a poor start, losing three of their first eight games, but the tide began to turn as Barcelona experienced a brilliant run, losing only 3 of their next 30 games. Going into the final matchday, Barcelona trailed Real Madrid by a point. Real Madrid lost to Tenerife 2–3, but Barcelona won their final game, securing a second consecutive title for the Catalonian club.

== Players ==
=== First-team squad ===
Squad at end of season

Note: Flags indicate national team as defined under FIFA eligibility rules; some limited exceptions apply. Players may hold more than one non-FIFA nationality.

No.	Pos.	Nation	Player
1	GK	ESP	Andoni Zubizarreta (vice-captain)
13	GK	ESP	Carles Busquets
4	DF	NED	Ronald Koeman
14	DF	ESP	Miguel Ángel Nadal
2	DF	ESP	Albert Ferrer
3	DF	ESP	Nando Muñoz
5	DF	ESP	Juan Carlos
12	DF	ESP	José Ramón Alexanko (captain)
18	DF	ESP	Ricardo Serna
17	DF	ESP	Cristóbal Parralo

No.	Pos.	Nation	Player
20	MF	ESP	José Mari Bakero
6	MF	ESP	Guillermo Amor
7	MF	ESP	Eusebio Sacristán
15	MF	ESP	Pep Guardiola
19	MF	NED	Richard Witschge
9	FW	DEN	Michael Laudrup
8	FW	BUL	Hristo Stoichkov
11	FW	ESP	Txiki Begiristain
16	FW	ESP	Andoni Goikoetxea
10	FW	ESP	Julio Salinas

=== Transfers ===
In
Pos.	Name	from	Type
DF	Miguel Ángel Nadal	Mallorca	
MF	Richard Witschge	Ajax	
DF	Juan Carlos	Atlético Madrid	
DF	Cristóbal	Logroñes	

Out
Pos.	Name	To	Type
DF	Sebastián Herrera	Mallorca	-
DF	Miquel Soler	Atlético Madrid	-
DF	Luis López Rekarte	Deportivo La Coruña	-

==== Winter ====
In
Pos.	Name	from	Type

Out
Pos.	Name	To	Type

=== Left club during season ===
Note: Flags indicate national team as defined under FIFA eligibility rules; some limited exceptions apply. Players may hold more than one non-FIFA nationality.

No.	Pos.	Nation	Player
—	MF	ESP	Urbano Ortega (to Espanyol)

=== Reserve squad ===
Note: Flags indicate national team as defined under FIFA eligibility rules; some limited exceptions apply. Players may hold more than one non-FIFA nationality.

No.	Pos.	Nation	Player
—	GK	ESP	Jesús Angoy
—	DF	ESP	Lluís Carreras
—	DF	ESP	Sánchez Jara

No.	Pos.	Nation	Player
—	FW	ESP	Antonio Pinilla
—	FW	DEN	Thomas Christiansen (Note: Christiansen was born in Hadsund, Denmark, but also qualified to represent Spain internationally through his mother and represented Spain at U-21 level before making his international debut for Spain in January 1993.)
—	FW	ESP	Pablo Maqueda

== Results ==
=== Supercopa de España ===
15 October 1991	Atlético Madrid	0–1	Barcelona	Madrid
21:00 CET			Amor 86'	Stadium: Vicente Calderón; Attendance: 15,000; Referee: Merino Gonzalez

29 October 1991	Barcelona	1–1	Atlético Madrid	Barcelona
20:45 CET	Bakero 69'		Alfredo 39'	Stadium: Camp Nou; Attendance: 45,000; Referee: José Luis Pajares

=== La Liga ===
==== League table ====
Pos	Team	Pld	W	D	L	GF	GA	GD	Pts	Qualification or relegation
1	Barcelona (C)	38	23	9	6	87	37	+50	55	Qualification for the Champions League first round
2	Real Madrid	38	23	8	7	78	32	+46	54	Qualification for the UEFA Cup first round
3	Atlético Madrid	38	24	5	9	67	35	+32	53	Qualification for the Cup Winners' Cup first round (Note: Atlético Madrid qualified for the European Cup Winners' Cup as champions of the Copa del Rey.)
4	Valencia	38	20	7	11	63	42	+21	47	Qualification for the UEFA Cup first round
5	Real Sociedad	38	16	12	10	44	38	+6	44	Qualification for the UEFA Cup first round

Source: BDFútbol
Rules for classification: 1) Points; 2) Head-to-head results; 3) Goal difference; 4) Number of goals scored
(C) Champions

==== Results by round ====
Round	1	2	3	4	5	6	7	8	9	10	11	12	13	14	15	16	17	18	19	20	21	22	23	24	25	26	27	28	29	30	31	32	33	34	35	36	37	38
Ground	H	A	H	A	H	A	H	A	H	A	H	A	H	A	H	A	H	H	A	A	H	A	H	A	H	A	H	A	H	A	H	A	H	A	H	A	A	H
Result	W	L	W	L	L	D	W	D	W	W	W	D	W	D	W	W	W	W	W	L	W	W	D	W	D	D	W	D	W	L	W	L	D	W	W	W	W	W
Position	4	8	5	8	10	13	8	7	7	6	5	5	3	3	3	3	2	2	2	2	2	2	2	2	2	2	2	2	2	2	2	2	3	3	2	2	2	1

Source: Competitive matches
A = Away; H = Home; W = Win; D = Draw; L = Loss; = Leader, 1992–93 UEFA Champions League; = 1992–93 UEFA Cup

==== Matches ====
31 August 1991 1	Barcelona	2–0	Real Sociedad	Barcelona
	Stoichkov 7'; Koeman 89'	Report		Stadium: Camp Nou

6 September 1991 2	Sevilla	4–2	Barcelona	Seville
	Zamorano 16', 43'; Conte 39'; Cortijo 85'	Report	Stoichkov 56'; Eusebio 82'	Stadium: Estadio Sánchez Pizjuán

13 September 1991 3	Barcelona	3–1	Real Zaragoza	Barcelona
	Eusebio 12'; Bakero 50'; Begiristain 88'	Report	Higuera 30'	Stadium: Camp Nou

27 September 1991 4	Sporting de Gijón	2–1	Barcelona	Gijón
	Abelardo 15'; Monchu 68'	Report	Laudrup 78' (pen.)	Stadium: Estadio El Molinón; Referee: Madrid

6 October 1991 5	Barcelona	1–2	Real Oviedo	Barcelona
	Salinas 43'	Report	Jordi Vinyals 29'; Carlos 41'	Stadium: Camp Nou

19 October 1991 6	Real Madrid	1–1	Barcelona	Madrid
	Prosinečki 19'	Report	Koeman 58' (pen.)	Stadium: Santiago Bernabéu

26 October 1991 7	Barcelona	1–0	Atlético Madrid	Barcelona
	Stoichkov 39'	Report		Stadium: Camp Nou

2 November 1991 8	Logroñés	2–2	Barcelona	Logroño
	Poyatos 8'; Uribarrena 45'	Report	Amor 4'; Koeman 49' (pen.)	Stadium: Las Gaunas

9 November 1991 9	Barcelona	2–0	Osasuna	Barcelona
	Koeman 46' (pen.); Bakero 84'	Report		Stadium: Camp Nou

16 November 1991 10	Deportivo de La Coruña	0–4	Barcelona	A Coruña
		Report	Koeman 28' (pen.); Stoichkov 59'; Laudrup 68'; Begiristain 82'	Stadium: Riazor

22 November 1991 11	Barcelona	3–1	Valencia	Barcelona
	Amor 35'; Laudrup 58', 79'	Report	Eloy 78'	Stadium: Camp Nou

29 November 1991 12	Albacete	1–1	Barcelona	Albacete
	Catali 25'	Report	Stoichkov 42'	Stadium: Carlos Belmonte

6 December 1991 13	Barcelona	5–3	Tenerife	Barcelona
	Laudrup 36'; Amor 46'; Alexanko 83'; Nadal 88'; Salinas 89'	Report	Dertycia 53'; Pizzi 62', 89'	Stadium: Camp Nou

14 December 1991 14	Real Burgos	2–2	Barcelona	Burgos
	Tocornal 18'; Balint 63'	Report	Amor 4'; Laudrup 88'	Stadium: El Plantío

20 December 1991 15	Barcelona	4–1	Cádiz	Barcelona
	Koeman 38'; Laudrup 52'; Bakero 54'; Begiristain 88'	Report	Fali 84'	Stadium: Camp Nou

4 January 1992 16	Mallorca	1–2	Barcelona	Palma
	Sergio García 43'	Report	Koeman 23'; Laudrup 56'	Stadium: Lluís Sitjar

11 January 1992 17	Barcelona	2–1	Real Valladolid	Barcelona
	Salinas 26', 53'	Report	Fonseca 59'	Stadium: Camp Nou

18 January 1992 18	Barcelona	4–3	Español	Barcelona
	Begiristain 10'; Laudrup 29'; Stoichkov 44'; Koeman 81'	Report	Korneev 46', 48' (pen.); Lluis 88'	Stadium: Camp Nou

24 January 1992 19	Athletic Bilbao	0–2	Barcelona	Bilbao
		Report	Bakero 40', 54'	Stadium: San Mamés

1 February 1992 20	Real Sociedad	2–1	Barcelona	San Sebastián
	Carlos Xavier 4'; Alkiza 63'	Report	Bakero 44'	Stadium: Atotxa

7 February 1992 21	Barcelona	1–0	Sevilla	Barcelona
	Salinas 88'	Report		Stadium: Camp Nou

14 February 1992 22	Real Zaragoza	0–4	Barcelona	Zaragoza
		Report	Koeman 30', 73' (pen.); Bakero 62'; Laudrup 85'	Stadium: La Romareda

22 February 1992 23	Barcelona	1–1	Sporting de Gijón	Barcelona
	Laudrup 12'	Report	Juanele 13' (pen.)	Stadium: Camp Nou

28 February 1992 24	Real Oviedo	0–2	Barcelona	Oviedo
		Report	Stoichkov 57'; Laudrup 68'	Stadium: Carlos Tartiere

6 March 1992 25	Barcelona	1–1	Real Madrid	Barcelona
	Koeman 36'	Report	Hierro 66'	Stadium: Camp Nou

13 March 1992 26	Atlético Madrid	2–2	Barcelona	Madrid
	Manolo 6', 15'	Report	Nadal 74'; Bakero 80'	Stadium: Vicente Calderón

21 March 1992 27	Barcelona	1–0	Logroñés	Barcelona
	Begiristain 46'	Report		Stadium: Camp Nou

27 March 1992 28	Osasuna	0–0	Barcelona	Pamplona
		Report		Stadium: El Sadar

4 April 1992 29	Barcelona	4–1	Deportivo de La Coruña	Barcelona
	Stoichkov 9'; Salinas 61', 79'; Bakero 84'	Report	Đukić 29'	Stadium: Camp Nou

10 April 1992 30	Valencia	1–0	Barcelona	Valencia
	Fernando Gómez 44'	Report		Stadium: Mestalla

17 April 1992 31	Barcelona	7–1	Albacete	Barcelona
	Bakero 12', 89'; Stoichkov 18', 63', 68', 77'; Koeman 73' (pen.)	Report	José Zalazar 83'	Stadium: Camp Nou

24 April 1992 32	Tenerife	2–1	Barcelona	Santa Cruz de Tenerife
	Pizzi 2', 39'	Report	Amor 6'	Stadium: Estadio Heliodoro Rodriguez

2 May 1992 33	Barcelona	1–1	Real Burgos	Barcelona
	Amor 52'	Report	Alejandro 33'	Stadium: Camp Nou

9 May 1992 34	Cádiz	0–2	Barcelona	Cádiz
		Report	Stoichkov 24'; Laudrup 37'	Stadium: Ramón de Carranza

15 May 1992 35	Barcelona	3–0	Mallorca	Barcelona
	Koeman 34' (pen.); Begiristain 63'; Eusebio 70'	Report		Stadium: Camp Nou

23 May 1992 36	Real Valladolid	0–6	Barcelona	Valladolid
		Report	Stoichkov 15', 27'; Nadal 56'; Koeman 58' (pen.), 86' (pen.); Laudrup 75'	Stadium: Estadio José Zorrilla

30 May 1992 37	Español	0–4	Barcelona	Barcelona
		Report	Koeman 30' (pen.); Begiristain 52'; Eusebio 60'; Ferrer 89'	Stadium: Sarrià

6 June 1992 38	Barcelona	2–0	Athletic Bilbao	Barcelona
	Stoichkov 36', 49'	Report		Stadium: Camp Nou

Source:Competitive Matches

=== Copa del Rey ===
==== Eight-finals ====
9 January 1992	Valencia	2–0	Barcelona	Valencia
	Eloy 27'; Penev 69'			Stadium: Mestalla

22 January 1992	Barcelona	4–2 (4–4 agg.) (4–5 p)	Valencia	Barcelona
	Stoichkov 1'; Laudrup 9', 99'; Nadal 18'		Penev 45'; Arroyo 119'	Stadium: Camp Nou
	Penalties
	Koeman (penalty scored); Laudrup (penalty scored); Amor (penalty scored); Nadal (penalty missed); Busquets (penalty scored)		(penalty scored) Penev; (penalty scored) Roberto; (penalty scored) Camarasa; (penalty scored) Leonardo; (penalty scored) Fernando

=== European Cup ===
==== First round ====
18 September 1991	Barcelona (Spain)	3–0	(Germany) Hansa Rostock	Barcelona
	Laudrup 25', 47'; Goikoetxea 77'	Report		Stadium: Camp Nou; Attendance: 65,000; Referee: Alphonse Constantin (Belgium)

2 October 1991	Hansa Rostock (Germany)	1–0 (1-3 agg.)	(Spain) Barcelona	Rostock
	Spies 66'	Report		Stadium: Ostseestadion; Attendance: 8,000; Referee: Pierluigi Pairetto (Italy)

==== Second round ====
23 October 1991	Barcelona (Spain)	2–0	(Germany) Kaiserslautern	Barcelona
	Begiristain 41', 53'	Report		Stadium: Camp Nou; Attendance: 65,000; Referee: (France) Gérard Biguet

6 November 1991	Kaiserslautern (Germany)	3–1 (3–3a agg.)	(Spain) Barcelona	Kaiserslautern
	Hotić 35', 49'; Goldbæk 76'	Report	Bakero 90'	Stadium: Fritz-Walter-Stadion; Attendance: 30,200; Referee: (Sweden) Erik Fredriksson

==== Group stage ====
===== Group B =====
Pos	Team	Pld	W	D	L	GF	GA	GD	Pts	Qualification	BAR	SPP	BEN	DKV
1	(Spain) Barcelona	6	4	1	1	10	4	+6	9	Advance to final	—	3–2	2–1	3–0
2	(Czechoslovakia) Sparta Prague	6	2	2	2	7	7	0	6		1–0	—	1–1	2–1
3	(Portugal) Benfica	6	1	3	2	8	5	+3	5		0–0	1–1	—	5–0
4	(Commonwealth of Independent States) Dynamo Kyiv	6	2	0	4	3	12	−9	4		0–2	1–0	1–0	—

Source: UEFA

27 November 1991	Barcelona (Spain)	3–2	(Czechoslovakia) Sparta Prague	Camp Nou, Barcelona
20:45	Amor 14'; Laudrup 34'; Bakero 61'	Report	Vrabec 19'; Němeček 64'	Attendance: 80,000; Referee: Kim Milton Nielsen (Denmark)

11 December 1991	Benfica (Portugal)	0–0	(Spain) Barcelona	Estádio da Luz, Lisbon
22:00		Report		Attendance: 70,000; Referee: Bruno Galler (Switzerland)

4 March 1992	Dynamo Kyiv (Commonwealth of Independent States)	0–2	(Spain) Barcelona	Republican Stadium, Kyiv
19:00		Report	Stoichkov 33'; Salinas 66'	Attendance: 48,500; Referee: Guy Goethals (Belgium)

18 March 1992	Barcelona (Spain)	3–0	(Commonwealth of Independent States) Dynamo Kyiv	Camp Nou, Barcelona
20:45	Stoichkov 60', 81'; Salinas 88'	Report		Attendance: 53,000; Referee: Karl-Josef Assenmacher (Germany)

1 April 1992	Sparta Prague (Czechoslovakia)	1–0	(Spain) Barcelona	Letná Stadium, Prague
18:00	Siegl 65'	Report		Attendance: 27,374; Referee: Bo Karlsson (Sweden)

15 April 1992	Barcelona (Spain)	2–1	(Portugal) Benfica	Camp Nou, Barcelona
20:00	Stoichkov 10'; Bakero 25'	Report	Brito 29'	Attendance: 100,000; Referee: Hubert Forstinger (Austria)

==== Final ====
20 May 1992	Sampdoria (Italy)	0–1 (a.e.t.)	(Spain) Barcelona	Wembley, London
19:15 BST	Mannini (yellow card) 39'; Vierchowod (yellow card) 66'; Mancini (yellow card) 118'	Report	Bakero (yellow card) 75'; Koeman 112'	Attendance: 70,827; Referee: (Germany) Aron Schmidhuber

=== Friendlies ===
GAMES 1991–1992

7-5-1992 COPA GENERALITAT BARCELONA- PREMIÀ 5–0

3-6-1992 COPA GENERALITAT LLEIDA-BARCELONA 2–0

31-7-1991 FRIENDLY HSC '21-BARCELONA 0–3

2-8-1991 FRIENDLY SV ZUPTHEN-BARCELONA 0–15

4-8-1991 FRIENDLY SV RAALTE-BARCELONA 0–14

7-8-1991 FRIENDLY GRONINGEN-BARCELONA 2–2

8-8-1991 FRIENDLY SELECT ODOORN-BARCELONA 0–15

10-8-1991 FRIENDLY BRUJAS-BARCELONA 1–1

14-8-1991 CITY OF PALMA TROPHY MALLORCA-BARCELONA 3–1

16-8-1991 CITY OF LA LÍNEA TROPHY HONVÉD-BARCELONA 0–1

20-8-1991 Joan Gamper Trophy BARCELONA-RAPID VIENA 4–1

21-8-1991 Joan Gamper Trophy BARCELONA-MARSEILLE 3–0

24-8-1991 FRIENDLY RACING SANTANDER-BARCELONA 1–0

11-9-1991 Desafío Total Canal+ REAL MADRID-BARCELONA 1–1

12-6-1992 FRIENDLY VALENCIA-BARCELONA 2–4

16-6-1992 FRIENDLY CELTA VIGO-BARCELONA 2–1

== Statistics ==
=== Appearances and goals ===
No.	Pos	Nat	Player	Total		La Liga		Copa del Rey		European Cup	
No.	Pos	Nat	Player	Apps	Goals	Apps	Goals	Apps	Goals	Apps	Goals
	GK	(Spain) ESP	Zubizarreta	49	-45	38	-37	0	0	11	-8
	DF	(Spain) ESP	Nando	38	0	25+4	0	1	0	8	0
	DF	(Netherlands) NED	Koeman	48	17	35	16	2	0	11	1
	DF	(Spain) ESP	Juan Carlos	29	0	19+3	0	2	0	4+1	0
	MF	(Spain) ESP	Amor	41	7	35+1	6	2	0	2+1	1
	MF	(Spain) ESP	Guardiola	39	0	26	0	1+1	0	11	0
	MF	(Spain) ESP	Bakero	43	14	31+2	11	1	0	9	3
	MF	(Spain) ESP	Eusebio	41	4	28+2	4	1	0	10	0
	FW	(Denmark) DEN	Laudrup	49	18	36	13	2	2	11	3
	FW	(Bulgaria) BUL	Stoichkov	42	22	30+2	17	1	1	9	4
	FW	(Spain) ESP	Begiristain	44	9	28+6	7	2	0	5+3	2
	GK	(Spain) ESP	Busquets	2	-4	0	0	2	-4	0	0
	MF	(Netherlands) NED	Witschge	33	0	12+11	0	1	0	9	0
	FW	(Spain) ESP	Goikoetxea	40	1	22+10	0	1+1	0	4+2	1
	FW	(Spain) ESP	Salinas	26	9	3+14	7	2	0	3+4	2
	DF	(Spain) ESP	Nadal	36	5	18+7	4	1+1	1	4+5	0
	DF	(Spain) ESP	Ferrer	16	1	12	1	0	0	4	0
	DF	(Spain) ESP	Alexanko	10	1	2+5	1	0	0	0+3	0
	DF	(Spain) ESP	Serna	22	0	12+3	0	1	0	5+1	0
	DF	(Spain) ESP	Cristóbal	14	0	6+5	0	0	0	1+2	0
	MF	(Spain) ESP	Ortega	0	0	0	0	0	0	0	0
