= 1990 Supercopa de España =

| Barcelona | Real Madrid |
| (Spain) | (Spain) |
| 1 | 5 |
- on aggregate

First leg
| Barcelona | Real Madrid |
| 0 | 1 |
- Date: 5 December 1990
- Venue: Camp Nou, Barcelona
- Referee: Ildefonso Urizar Azpitarte

Second leg
| Real Madrid | Barcelona |
| 4 | 1 |
- Date: 12 December 1990
- Venue: Santiago Bernabéu, Madrid
- Referee: Joaquín Urío Velázquez

The 1990 Supercopa de España was two-leg Spanish football matches played on 5 December and 12 December 1990. It contested by Barcelona, who were Spanish Cup winners in 1989–90, and Real Madrid, who won the 1989–90 Spanish League. Real Madrid won 5–1 on aggregate.

== Match details ==
=== First leg ===
5 December 1990
20:45 CET

| Barcelona (Spain) | 0–1 | Real Madrid (Spain) |
|---|---|---|
| | | Míchel 54' |

Camp Nou, Barcelona
Attendance: 40,000
Referee: Ildefonso Urízar Azpitarte

| Barcelona | Real Madrid CF |

Barcelona:
| GK | 1 | (Spain) Andoni Zubizarreta (c) |
| DF | 5 | (Spain) Luis López Rekarte |
| DF | 3 | (Spain) Álex |
| DF | 2 | (Spain) Nando |
| DF | 11 | (Spain) Miquel Soler |
| MF | 4 | (Spain) Eusebio Sacristán |
| MF | 6 | (Spain) Sebastián Herrera | (yellow card) 27' |
| MF | 10 | (Spain) Guillermo Amor |
| FW | 8 | (Bulgaria) Hristo Stoichkov | (yellow card) 41' (red card) 41' |
| FW | 9 | (Spain) Julio Salinas |
| FW | 7 | (Spain) Lluís Carreras | | (substituted off) 59' |
Substitutes:
| GK | 13 | (Spain) Carles Busquets |
| MF | 12 | (Spain) Urbano | | (substituted in) 59' |
| MF | 14 | (Spain) José Mari Bakero |
| MF | 15 | (Spain) Sánchez Jara |
| FW | 16 | (Spain) Antonio Pinilla |
Manager:
| (Netherlands) Johan Cruyff | | | (yellow card) 40' (red card) 40' |

Real Madrid:
| GK | 1 | (Spain) Francisco Buyo |
| DF | 2 | (Spain) Chendo (c) |
| DF | 4 | (Spain) Fernando Hierro |
| DF | 6 | (Socialist Federal Republic of Yugoslavia) Predrag Spasić | (yellow card) 15' |
| DF | 3 | (Spain) Jesús Solana |
| MF | 8 | (Spain) Míchel | | (substituted off) 86' |
| MF | 5 | (Spain) Manuel Sanchís | (yellow card) 49' |
| MF | 10 | (Spain) Santiago Aragón | | (substituted off) 78' |
| MF | 11 | (Spain) Francisco Villarroya |
| FW | 7 | (Spain) Emilio Butragueño |
| FW | 9 | (Mexico) Hugo Sánchez | (yellow card) 89' |
Substitutes:
| GK | 13 | (Spain) Pedro Jaro |
| DF | 12 | (Spain) Miguel Tendillo |
| MF | 14 | (Spain) Adolfo Aldana | | (substituted in) 78' |
| MF | 15 | (Romania) Gheorghe Hagi | | (substituted in) 86' |
| FW | 16 | (Spain) Sebastián Losada |
Manager:
(Argentina) Alfredo Di Stéfano

=== Second leg ===
12 December 1990
20:45 CET

| Real Madrid (Spain) | 4–1 | Barcelona (Spain) |
|---|---|---|
| Butragueño 22', 44'; Hugo Sánchez 56'; Aragón 70' | | Goikoetxea 20' |

Santiago Bernabéu, Madrid
Attendance: 70,000
Referee: Joaquín Urío Velázquez

| Real Madrid | Barcelona |

Real Madrid:
| GK | 1 | (Spain) Francisco Buyo |
| DF | 2 | (Spain) Chendo (c) |
| DF | 4 | (Spain) Fernando Hierro | (yellow card) 19' |
| DF | 5 | (Spain) Manuel Sanchís |
| DF | 3 | (Spain) Jesús Solana | (yellow card) 60' |
| MF | 8 | (Spain) Míchel |
| MF | 6 | (Spain) Juanjo Maqueda |
| MF | 10 | (Spain) Santiago Aragón |
| MF | 11 | (Spain) Francisco Villarroya |
| FW | 7 | (Spain) Emilio Butragueño | | (substituted off) 75' |
| FW | 9 | (Mexico) Hugo Sánchez | | (substituted off) 75' |
Substitutes:
| GK | 13 | (Spain) Pedro Jaro |
| DF | 12 | (Socialist Federal Republic of Yugoslavia) Predrag Spasić |
| MF | 14 | (Spain) Adolfo Aldana | | (substituted in) 75' |
| MF | 15 | (Romania) Gheorghe Hagi |
| FW | 16 | (Spain) Sebastián Losada | | (substituted in) 75' |
Manager:
(Argentina) Alfredo Di Stéfano

Barcelona:
| GK | 1 | (Spain) Andoni Zubizarreta (c) |
| DF | 2 | (Spain) Sebastián Herrera | (yellow card) 23' |
| DF | 5 | (Spain) Ricardo Serna |
| DF | 3 | (Spain) Álex | (yellow card) 14' |
| MF | 7 | (Spain) Jon Andoni Goikoetxea |
| MF | 4 | (Spain) Eusebio |
| MF | 10 | (Spain) Guillermo Amor | (yellow card) 40' |
| MF | 6 | (Spain) Miquel Soler |
| FW | 9 | (Spain) Julio Salinas |
| FW | 8 | (Denmark) Michael Laudrup | | (substituted off) 71' |
| FW | 11 | (Spain) Txiki Begiristain | | (substituted off) 46' |
Substitutes:
| GK | 13 | (Spain) Carles Busquets |
| DF | 12 | (Spain) José Ramón Alexanko |
| DF | 15 | (Spain) Luis López Rekarte | | (substituted in) 71' |
| MF | 14 | (Spain) Urbano |
| FW | 16 | (Spain) Lluís Carreras | | (substituted in) 46' |
Manager:
(Netherlands) Johan Cruyff

Supercopa de España
1990 Winners
(Spain) Real Madrid
Third Title

== See also ==
- El Clásico
- 1990–91 La Liga
- 1990–91 Copa del Rey
- 1990–91 FC Barcelona season
- 1990–91 Real Madrid CF season
