= 1989–90 FC Barcelona season =

91st season in existence of FC Barcelona

Barcelona
1989–90 season
- President: Josep Lluís Núñez
- Head Coach: Johan Cruyff
- Stadium: Camp Nou
- La Liga: 3rd
- Copa del Rey: Winners
- UEFA Cup Winners' Cup: Second round
- UEFA Super Cup: Runners-up
- Top goalscorer: League: Julio Salinas (15); All: Julio Salinas; Ronald Koeman (18 each)
Home colours	Away colours	Third colours

The 1989–90 season was Barcelona's 91st season in existence and the club's 59th consecutive season in the top flight of Spanish football.

== Squad ==
Note: Flags indicate national team as defined under FIFA eligibility rules; some limited exceptions apply. Players may hold more than one non-FIFA nationality.

No.	Pos.	Nation	Player
—	GK	ESP	Juan Carlos Unzué
—	GK	ESP	Andoni Zubizarreta
—	GK	ESP	Julio Iglesias
—	DF	BRA	Aloísio
—	DF	ESP	José Ramón Alexanko (captain)
—	DF	ESP	Julio Alberto
—	DF	NED	Ronald Koeman
—	DF	ESP	Ricardo Serna
—	DF	ESP	Delfí Geli
—	DF	ESP	Sergi
—	DF	ESP	Miquel Soler
—	DF	ESP	Luis López Rekarte
—	MF	ESP	Guillermo Amor
—	MF	ESP	Onésimo

No.	Pos.	Nation	Player
—	MF	ESP	José Mari Bakero
—	MF	ESP	Eusebio
—	MF	ESP	Pep Guardiola
—	MF	ESP	Jordi Roura
—	MF	ESP	Urbano
—	MF	ESP	Luis Milla
—	MF	ESP	Robert
—	MF	ESP	Jesús Lucendo
—	FW	ESP	Ernesto Valverde
—	FW	ESP	Quique Martín
—	FW	ESP	Txiki Begiristain
—	FW	ESP	Julio Salinas
—	FW	DEN	Michael Laudrup
—	FW	ESP	Antonio Pinilla

=== Transfers ===
In
Pos.	Name	from	Type
MF	Michael Laudrup	Juventus	
DF	Ronald Koeman	PSV Eindhoven	
DF	Delfi Geli	Girona	
MF	Onésimo Sánchez	Cadiz	
FW	Ernesto Valverde	Español	

Out
Pos.	Name	To	Type
FW	Gary Lineker	Tottenham Hotspur	
FW	Lobo Carrasco	Sochaux	
FW	Romerito	Puebla	

== Competitions ==
=== La Liga ===
==== League table ====
Pos	Team	Pld	W	D	L	GF	GA	GD	Pts	Qualification or relegation
1	Real Madrid (C)	38	26	10	2	107	38	+69	62	Qualification for the European Cup first round
2	Valencia	38	20	13	5	67	42	+25	53	Qualification for the UEFA Cup first round
3	Barcelona	38	23	5	10	83	39	+44	51	Qualification for the Cup Winners' Cup first round (Note: Barcelona qualified for the European Cup Winners' Cup as champions of the Copa del Rey.)
4	Atlético Madrid	38	20	10	8	55	35	+20	50	Qualification for the UEFA Cup first round
5	Real Sociedad	38	15	14	9	43	35	+8	44	Qualification for the UEFA Cup first round

Source: BDFútbol
Rules for classification: 1) Points; 2) Head-to-head results; 3) Goal difference; 4) Number of goals scored
(C) Champions

==== Results by Round ====
Round	1	2	3	4	5	6	7	8	9	10	11	12	13	14	15	16	17	18	19	20	21	22	23	24	25	26	27	28	29	30	31	32	33	34	35	36	37	38
Ground	A	H	A	H	A	H	H	A	H	A	H	A	H	A	H	A	H	A	H	H	A	H	A	H	A	A	H	A	H	A	H	A	H	A	H	A	H	A
Result	L	W	L	W	L	W	W	D	W	W	W	L	W	L	W	W	L	W	W	W	W	D	L	D	L	W	D	W	W	W	L	W	W	W	W	D	W	L
Position	18	6	11	9	12	10	7	6	3	2	2	2	2	4	2	2	4	3	2	2	2	2	2	4	4	3	4	4	2	2	4	4	3	3	2	2	2	3

Source: BDFutbol
A = Away; H = Home; W = Win; D = Draw; L = Loss; = Leader, 1990-91 European Cup; = 1990-91 UEFA Cup; = relegation to 1990-91 Segunda Division; c = 1990–91 European Cup Winners' Cup

==== Matches ====
2 September 1989 1	Real Valladolid	2-0	Barcelona	Valladolid
	Janković 17'; Damián 66'			Stadium: José Zorrilla

9 September 1989 2	Barcelona	4-0	Osasuna	Barcelona
	Laudrup 8'; Koeman 72' (pen.) 83' (pen.); Eusebio 80'			Stadium: Camp Nou

16 September 1989 3	Real Oviedo	2-0	Barcelona	Oviedo
	Sarriugarte 17'; Gorriaran 39'			Stadium: Carlos Tartiere

24 September 1989 4	Barcelona	2-0	Castellón	Barcelona
	Laudrup 46'; Koeman 66' (pen.)			Stadium: Camp Nou

1 October 1989 5	Mallorca	1-0	Barcelona	Palma de Mallorca
	Vulić 75' (pen.)			Stadium: Lluís Sitjar

7 October 1989 6	Barcelona	3-1	Real Madrid	Barcelona
	Salinas 10'; Koeman 74' (pen.) 89' (pen.)		Sanchez 5' (pen.)	Stadium: Camp Nou

14 October 1989 7	Barcelona	7-1	Rayo Vallecano	Barcelona
	Salinas 8' 28'; Bakero 9'; Koeman 16' (pen.); Roberto 18'; Begiristain 63'; Milla 86' (pen.)		Zapatera 81'	Stadium: Camp Nou

21 October 1989 8	Real Sociedad	2-2	Barcelona	San Sebastián
	Aldridge 39' 55' (pen.)		Koeman 4'; Valverde 32'	Stadium: Atotxa

28 October 1989 9	Barcelona	3-0	Tenerife	Barcelona
	Eusebio 36'; Bakero 52'; Luis Delgado 55' (o.g.)			Stadium: Camp Nou

5 November 1989 10	Celta Vigo	1-2	Barcelona	Vigo
	Mosquera 44'		Bakero 22'; Begiristain 43'	Stadium: Estadio Balaídos

12 November 1989 11	Barcelona	4-2	Logroñés	Barcelona
	Salinas 42' 49'; Begiristain 56'; Koeman 60' (pen.)		Alzamendi 68'; Vílchez 83'	Stadium: Camp Nou

18 November 1989 12	Atlético Madrid	1-0	Barcelona	Madrid
	Manolo 11'			Stadium: Vicente Calderón

26 November 1989 13	Barcelona	2-0	Sporting de Gijón	Barcelona
	Bakero 54'; Roberto 77'			Stadium: Camp Nou

2 December 1989 14	Valencia	2-1	Barcelona	Valencia
	Voro 50'; Penev 65'		Salinas 5'	Stadium: Mestalla

10 December 1989 15	Barcelona	5-0	Cádiz	Barcelona
	Bakero 5' 66'; Begiristain 15'; Koeman 43'; Salinas 84'			Stadium: Camp Nou

17 December 1989 16	Málaga	0-1	Barcelona	Málaga
			Eusebio 75'	Stadium: La Rosaleda

30 December 1989 17	Barcelona	3-4	Sevilla	Barcelona
	Bakero 1'; Salinas 31'; Roberto 75'		Polster 28' (pen.) 79' (pen.); Carvajal 83'; Conte 87'	Stadium: Camp Nou

7 January 1990 18	Athletic Bilbao	1-2	Barcelona	Bilbao
	Mendiguren 55'		Begiristain 11' 89'	Stadium: San Mamés

14 January 1990 19	Barcelona	3-1	Real Zaragoza	Barcelona
	Koeman 3' (pen.); Salinas 42'; Roberto 61'		Juanito 8' (pen.)	Stadium: Camp Nou

21 January 1990 20	Barcelona	1-0	Real Valladolid	Barcelona
	Bakero 62'			Stadium: Camp Nou

27 January 1990 21	Osasuna	0-3	Barcelona	Pamplona
			Amor 23' 68'; Roberto 71'	Stadium: Estadio El Sadar

31 January 1990 22	Barcelona	0-0	Real Oviedo	Barcelona
				Stadium: Camp Nou

4 February 1990 23	Castellón	1-0	Barcelona	Castellón de la Plana
	Salvador 52' (pen.)			Stadium: Nou Estadi Castàlia

11 February 1990 24	Barcelona	1-1	Mallorca	Barcelona
	Amor 1'		Cortés 80' (pen.)	Stadium: Camp Nou

15 February 1990 25	Real Madrid	3-2	Barcelona	Madrid
	Michel 24'; Butragueño 45'; Sanchez 46' (pen.)		Salinas 54' 57'	Stadium: Santiago Bernabéu

18 February 1990 26	Rayo Vallecano	1-4	Barcelona	Madrid
	Rafa Bono 83'		Begiristain 16' 31'; Salinas 26'; Roberto 75'	Stadium: Vallecas

24 February 1990 27	Barcelona	2-2	Real Sociedad	Barcelona
	Salinas 31'; Menchaca 52' (o.g.)		Aldridge 55' 73'	Stadium: Camp Nou

4 March 1990 28	Tenerife	1-4	Barcelona	Santa Cruz de Tenerife
	Toño 28' (pen.)		Koeman 11' (pen.); Begiristain 49'; Bakero 73'; Amor 78'	Stadium: Estadio Heliodoro Rodriguez

11 March 1990 29	Barcelona	6-0	Celta Vigo	Barcelona
	Roberto 47' 65' 74'; Amor 77'; Laudrup 86'; Salinas 87'			Stadium: Camp Nou

18 March 1990 30	Logroñés	1-2	Barcelona	Logroño
	Sarabia 49'		Alexanko 55'; Begiristain 62'	Stadium: Las Gaunas

24 March 1990 31	Barcelona	0-2	Atlético Madrid	Barcelona
			Orejuela 39'; Baltazar 68'	Stadium: Camp Nou

31 March 1990 32	Sporting de Gijón	0-2	Barcelona	Gijón
			Valverde 47' 82'	Stadium: Estadio El Molinon

8 April 1990 33	Barcelona	2-1	Valencia	Barcelona
	Valverde 47' 64'		Penev 18' (pen.)	Stadium: Camp Nou

15 April 1990 34	Cádiz	0-4	Barcelona	Cádiz
			Valverde 15'; Bakero 49' 54'; Koeman 83'	Stadium: Nuevo Mirandilla

22 April 1990 35	Barcelona	1-0	Málaga	Barcelona
	Salinas 75'			Stadium: Camp Nou

25 April 1990 36	Sevilla	1-1	Barcelona	Sevilla
	Polster 32'		Amor 34'	Stadium: Estadio Sanchez Pizjuan

29 April 1990 37	Barcelona	4-2	Athletic Bilbao	Barcelona
	Koeman 37' 80'; Bakero 46' 76'		Garitano 33' (pen.); Loren 58'	Stadium: Camp Nou

6 May 1990 38	Real Zaragoza	2-0	Barcelona	Zaragoza
	Pardeza 6'; Sirakov 50'			Stadium: Estadio La Romareda

=== UEFA Cup Winners' Cup ===
13 September 1989 First leg	Barcelona (Spain)	1–1	(Poland) Legia Warsaw	Camp Nou, Barcelona
	Koeman 85' (pen.)	Report	Łatka 25'	Attendance: 30,000; Referee: Rolf Blattmann (Switzerland)

27 September 1989 Second leg	Legia Warsaw (Poland)	0–1	(Spain) Barcelona	Stadion Wojska Polskiego, Warsaw
		Report	Laudrup 11'	Attendance: 17,000; Referee: Heinz Holzmann (Austria)

18 October 1989 First leg	Anderlecht (Belgium)	2–0	(Spain) Barcelona	Constant Vanden Stock Stadium, Brussels
	Janković 12'; Degryse 46'	Report		Attendance: 25,000; Referee: Erik Fredriksson (Sweden)

1 November 1989 Second leg	Barcelona (Spain)	2–1 (a.e.t.)	(Belgium) Anderlecht	Camp Nou, Barcelona
	Salinas 50'; Begiristain 56'	Report	Van Der Linden 97'	Attendance: 86,159; Referee: Luigi Agnolin (Italy)

=== UEFA Supercup ===
23 November 1989	(Spain) Barcelona	1–1	(Italy) Milan	Barcelona
	Amor 67'	Report	Van Basten 44' (pen.)	Stadium: Camp Nou; Attendance: 50,000; Referee: Joël Quiniou (France)

7 December 1989	(Italy) Milan	1–0	(Spain) Barcelona	Milan
	Evani 55'	Report		Stadium: San Siro; Attendance: 52,093; Referee: Helmut Kohl (Austria)

=== Copa del Rey ===
==== Eight-finals ====
8 November 1989	Athletic Bilbao	0–1	Barcelona	Bilbao
			Koeman 39' (pen.)	Stadium: San Mamés

29 November 1989	Barcelona	1–0	Athletic Bilbao	Barcelona
	Koeman 77' (pen.)			Stadium: Camp Nou

==== Quarter-finals ====
17 January 1990	Real Sociedad	0–1	Barcelona	San Sebastián
			Salinas 39'	Stadium: Atotxa

24 January 1990	Barcelona	3–3 (a.e.t.)	Real Sociedad	Barcelona
	Bakero 3'; Laudrup 48' 95'		Aldridge 6' (pen.) 74'; Menchaca 19'	Stadium: Camp Nou

==== Semi-finals ====
7 February 1990	Barcelona	2–1	Valencia	Barcelona
	Roberto 54'; Koeman 58' (pen.)		Fernando Gómez 34'	Stadium: Camp Nou

28 February 1990	Valencia	1–1	Barcelona	Valencia
	Giner 12'		Koeman 79'	Stadium: Mestalla

==== Final ====
5 April 1990	Barcelona	2–0	Real Madrid	Valencia
20:00 CET	Amor 68'; Salinas 90'	Report (in Spanish)		Stadium: Mestalla; Attendance: 44,240; Referee: Raúl García de Loza

=== Friendlies ===
GAMES 1989–1990
31-7-1989 FRIENDLY SELECT DRENTHE-BARCELONA 1-10

1-8-1989 FRIENDLY BUITENPOSTS ZM1-BARCELONA 1-15

3-8-1989 FRIENDLY SVV-BARCELONA 0-5

4-8-1989 FRIENDLY MVV-BARCELONA 0-15

6-8-1989 FRIENDLY TWENTE-BARCELONA 0-4

7-8-1989 FRIENDLY CSVC COEVORDER-BARCELONA 1-5

9-8-1989 Trofeo Ciudad de Benidorm BENIDORM-BARCELONA 3-3 /5-6/ PENALTY

11-8-1989 Trofeo Ciudad de Palma CSKA SOFIA-BARCELONA 2-5

12-8-1989 Trofeo Ciudad de Palma FORTUNA DÜSSELDORF-BARCELONA 2-1

16-8-1989 Trofeo Ciudad de Málaga MÁLAGA-BARCELONA 2-2 /4-5/ PENALS

18-8-1989 Festa d'Elx Trophy ELCHE-BARCELONA 1-4

22-8-1989 Joan Gamper Trophy BARCELONA-SOCHAUX 1-2

23-8-1989 Joan Gamper Trophy BARCELONA-INTERNACIONAL 1-0

25-8-1989 Ciutat de Barcelona Trophy BARCELONA-ESPANYOL 2-1

27-8-1989 FRIENDLY FIGUERAS-BARCELONA 3-1

29-8-1989 FRIENDLY PALAMOS-BARCELONA 2-1

5-9-1989 FRIENDLY BARCELONA-BULGARIA 3-1

1-5-1990 FRIENDLY BARCELONA-ALBACETE 4-1

10-5-1990 FRIENDLY BARCELONA-TORTOSA 3-0

15-5-1990 FRIENDLY BARCELONA-IGUALADA 5-0

17-5-1990 FRIENDLY BARCELONA-MOLLERUSA 3-3

22-5-1990 FRIENDLY BARCELONA-MANLLEU 7-0

24-5-1990 FRIENDLY BARCELONA-BLANES 6-3

29-5-1990 FRIENDLY BARCELONA-LLEIDA 5-2

31-5-1990 FRIENDLY BARCELONA-PALAMOS 1-2

2-6-1990 FRIENDLY BARCELONA-ANDORRA 6-0

== Statistics ==
=== Players statistics ===
No.	Pos	Nat	Player	Total		La Liga		UEFA CWC		Copa del Rey	
No.	Pos	Nat	Player	Apps	Goals	Apps	Goals	Apps	Goals	Apps	Goals
	GK	(Spain) ESP	Zubizarreta	46	-46	35+0	-37	4+0	-4	7+0	-5
	DF	(Spain) ESP	Lopez Rekarte	28	0	19+2	0	2+0	0	3+2	0
	DF	(Netherlands) NED	Koeman	47	19	36+0	14	4+0	1	7+0	4
	DF	(Brazil) BRA	Aloisio	29	0	17+4	0	3+0	0	5+0	0
	MF	(Spain) ESP	Amor	41	7	25+8	6	1+1	0	6+0	1
	MF	(Spain) ESP	Bakero	39	14	27+3	13	2+0	0	7+0	1
	MF	(Spain) ESP	Robert	43	10	31+2	9	4+0	0	6+0	1
	MF	(Spain) ESP	Eusebio	45	3	34+2	3	4+0	0	5+0	0
	FW	(Denmark) DEN	Laudrup	43	6	33+0	3	3+0	1	6+1	2
	FW	(Spain) ESP	Salinas	45	18	29+5	15	4+0	1	7+0	2
	FW	(Spain) ESP	Begiristain	48	11	35+2	10	4+0	1	7+0	0
	GK	(Spain) ESP	Juan Carlos	3	-2	3+0	-2	0+0	-0	0+0	-0
	MF	(Spain) ESP	Luis Milla	33	1	23+2	1	1+2	0	5+0	0
	DF	(Spain) ESP	Serna	27	0	18+2	0	3+0	0	2+2	0
	DF	(Spain) ESP	Alexanko	22	1	11+5	1	1+1	0	2+2	0
	DF	(Spain) ESP	Soler	32	0	7+20	0	1+0	0	0+4	0
	DF	(Spain) ESP	Julio Alberto	18	0	10+4	0	1+1	0	2+0	0
	FW	(Spain) ESP	Valverde	13	6	6+6	6	1+0	0	0+0	0
	MF	(Spain) ESP	Urbano	9	0	7+0	0	1+0	0	0+1	0
	DF	(Spain) ESP	Sergi Lopez	11	0	9+1	0	0+1	0	0+0	0
	DF	(Spain) ESP	Delfi Geli	1	0	1+0	0	0+0	0	0+0	0
	MF	(Spain) ESP	Jordi Roura	3	0	1+1	0	0+1	0	0+0	0
	MF	(Spain) ESP	Lucendo	1	0	1+0	0	0+0	0	0+0	0
	FW	(Spain) ESP	Onesimo	3	0	0+2	0	0+1	0	0+0	0
	FW	(Spain) ESP	Pinilla	1	0	0+1	0	0+0	0	0+0	0
