= 1990–91 Real Madrid CF season =

89th season in existence of Real Madrid CF

Real Madrid C.F.
1990–91 season
- President: Ramón Mendoza
- Head coach: John Toshack (until 17 November 1990); Alfredo Di Stéfano (until 21 March 1991); Ramón Grosso (until 24 March 1991); Radomir Antić
- Stadium: Santiago Bernabéu
- La Liga: 3rd (in UEFA Cup)
- Copa del Rey: Round of 16
- Supercopa de España: Winners
- European Cup: Quarter-finals
- Top goalscorer: League: Butragueño (19); All: Butragueño (23)
Home colours	Away colours

The 1990–91 season was Real Madrid Club de Fútbol's 89th season in existence and the club's 60th consecutive season in the top flight of Spanish football.

== Summary ==
In the summertime, Welsh head coach John Toshack asked for several changes, including the transfers of Bernd Schuster to local rivals Atlético Madrid and defender Oscar Ruggeri, together with midfielder Martín Vázquez, to Torino FC. Meanwhile, President Ramon Mendoza, after a failed bid for Liverpool's John Barnes, reinforced the club with Gheorghe Hagi, Predrag Spasić (after Gheorghe Popescu rejected an offer from Mendoza) and Villaroya. Following a losing streak sinking the team down to the 6th place in the league, Mendoza fired Toshack on 25 November 1990 and appointed club legend Alfredo Di Stéfano as a new head coach. The team clinched the Supercopa de España, defeating FC Barcelona but the situation in the league was worsened with lost matches against Athletic Bilbao, Osasuna, Atlético Madrid and Barcelona.

During February, forward Hugo Sánchez suffered his first injury, and the squad was eliminated in the Copa del Rey round of 16 by Atlético Madrid. Then in March, with a high risk of failing to qualify for next year's European competitions, the team was defeated by Russian side Spartak Moscow at the Santiago Bernabéu Stadium in the European Cup quarter-finals, shattering the chances of Alfredo Di Stéfano to stay as a coach and he resigned after the elimination. After one game with Ramón Grosso as an interim manager, the club appointed Radomir Antić as a new permanent head coach.

Surprisingly, despite the chaotic situation and Hugo Sánchez out for the rest of season since 25 April, Antic managed the squad to reach the third spot in the league standings and the right to play in the 1991–92 UEFA Cup. His notable successes included matches won against Atlético Madrid and Barcelona in the final rounds of the season.

== Squad ==
Note: Flags indicate national team as defined under FIFA eligibility rules; some limited exceptions apply. Players may hold more than one non-FIFA nationality.

No.	Pos.	Nation	Player
—	GK	ESP	Buyo
—	GK	ESP	Pedro Luis Jaro
—	GK	ESP	Julen Lopetegui
—	DF	ESP	Chendo
—	DF	ESP	Fernando Hierro
—	DF	ESP	Manuel Sanchis
—	DF	ESP	Jesús Ángel Solana
—	DF	ESP	Francisco Villarroya
—	DF	YUG	Predrag Spasić
—	DF	ESP	Miguel Tendillo
—	DF	ESP	Víctor Torres Mestre
—	MF	ESP	Juan Maqueda
—	MF	ESP	Adolfo Aldana

No.	Pos.	Nation	Player
—	MF	ROU	Gheorghe Hagi
—	MF	ESP	Míchel
—	MF	ESP	Santiago Aragón
—	MF	ESP	Rafael Gordillo
—	MF	ESP	Luis Milla
—	MF	ESP	Joaquín Parra
—	MF	ESP	Paco Llorente
7	FW	ESP	Emilio Butragueño
—	FW	MEX	Hugo Sánchez
—	FW	ESP	Sebastián Losada
—	FW	ESP	Alfonso Pérez
—	FW	ARG	Juan Eduardo Esnáider
—	FW	ESP	Ismael Urzaiz

=== Transfers ===
In
Pos.	Name	from	Type
MF	Gheorghe Hagi	Steaua București	
MF	Luis Milla	FC Barcelona	€2,1 million
DF	Predrag Spasić	Partizan	
GK	Pedro Luis Jaro	Málaga CF	
DF	Maqueda	CD Logroñés	
MF	Santiago Aragon	CD Logroñés	
MF	Francisco Villarroya	Real Zaragoza	

Out
Pos.	Name	To	Type
FW	Bernd Schuster	Atlético Madrid	
MF	Martín Vázquez	Torino FC	
DF	Oscar Ruggeri	Velez Sarsfield	
FW	Aguilá	CD Logroñés	
GK	Agustin	CD Tenerife	
DF	Esteban	Real Zaragoza	
DF	Llorente	CD Tenerife	

==== Winter ====
In
Pos.	Name	from	Type
FW	Juan Eduardo Esnáider	Ferrocarril Oeste	

Out
Pos.	Name	To	Type

== Competitions ==
=== La Liga ===
==== League table ====
Pos	Team	Pld	W	D	L	GF	GA	GD	Pts	Qualification or relegation
1	Barcelona (C)	38	25	7	6	74	33	+41	57	Qualification for the European Cup first round
2	Atlético Madrid	38	17	13	8	52	28	+24	47	Qualification for the Cup Winners' Cup first round (Note: Atlético Madrid qualified for the European Cup Winners' Cup as champions of the Copa del Rey.)
3	Real Madrid	38	20	6	12	63	37	+26	46	Qualification for the UEFA Cup first round
4	Osasuna	38	15	15	8	43	34	+9	45	Qualification for the UEFA Cup first round
5	Sporting Gijón	38	16	12	10	50	37	+13	44	Qualification for the UEFA Cup first round

Source: BDFútbol
Rules for classification: 1) Points; 2) Head-to-head results; 3) Goal difference; 4) Number of goals scored
(C) Champions

==== Results by round ====
Round	1	2	3	4	5	6	7	8	9	10	11	12	13	14	15	16	17	18	19	20	21	22	23	24	25	26	27	28	29	30	31	32	33	34	35	36	37	38
Ground	H	A	H	A	H	A	H	A	A	H	A	H	A	H	A	H	A	H	A	A	H	A	H	A	H	A	H	H	A	H	A	H	A	H	A	H	A	H
Result	W	L	W	W	W	D	D	D	L	W	L	W	W	W	L	L	W	L	L	W	W	D	W	L	L	L	D	L	L	W	W	W	W	W	D	W	W	W
Position	2	13	5	3	5	5	3	3	4	4	6	4	3	3	4	5	4	6	6	5	4	4	4	4	4	6	5	7	9	8	5	4	4	4	4	4	3	3

Source: Competitive matches
A = Away; H = Home; W = Win; D = Draw; L = Loss; = Leader, 1992–93 UEFA Champions League; = 1992–93 UEFA Cup

==== Matches ====
2 September 1990 1	Real Madrid	1–0	C.D. Castellón	Madrid
	Sanchís 45'	Report		Stadium: Santiago Bernabeu; Referee: Rubio Valdivieso

7 September 1990 2	Sevilla FC	2–0	Real Madrid	Sevilla
	Zamorano 30'; Carvajal 73'	Report		Stadium: Sanchez Pizjuan

14 September 1990 3	Real Madrid	3–0	RCD Mallorca	Madrid
	Sánchez 59' (77); Butragueno 67'	Report		Stadium: Santiago Bernabeu

21 September 1990 4	Real Zaragoza	1–3	Real Madrid	Zaragoza
	Pardeza 71'	Report	Sánchez 26'; Tendillo 70'; Hagi 85'	Stadium: La Romareda

29 September 1990 5	Real Madrid	2–1	Cádiz CF	Madrid
	Sánchez 9' (57)	Report	Husillos 55'	Stadium: Santiago Bernabeu

7 October 1990 6	Real Sociedad	1–1	Real Madrid	San Sebastián
	Atkinson 23'	Report	Sánchez 16'	Stadium: Atotxa

14 October 1990 7	Real Madrid	0–0	CD Logroñés	Madrid
		Report		Stadium: Santiago Bernabeu

14 October 1990 8	Real Oviedo	0–0	Real Madrid	Oviedo
		Report		Stadium: Carlos Tartiere

28 October 1990 9	Real Burgos	2–1	Real Madrid	Burgos
	Jurić 68' (89)	Report	Sánchez 51'	Stadium: El Plantío

3 November 1990 10	Real Madrid	2–1	RCD Español	Madrid
	Butragueno 8' (72)	Report	Gay 59'	Stadium: Santiago Bernabeu

16 November 1990 11	Valencia CF	2–1	Real Madrid	Valencia
	Penev 27'; Roberto 41'	Report	Sánchez 71pen.'	Stadium: Mestalla

24 November 1990 12	Real Madrid	3–0	Real Betis	Madrid
	Butragueno 52'; Míchel 62pen' Bilbao 77og.'	Report		Stadium: Santiago Bernabeu

30 November 1990 13	Real Valladolid	0–1	Real Madrid	Valladolid
		Report	Sánchez 7'	Stadium: Jose Zorrilla

8 December 1990 14	Real Madrid	3–0	CD Tenerife	Madrid
	Butragueno 41'; Sánchez 46'; Losada 74'	Report		Stadium: Santiago Bernabeu

14 December 1990 15	Athletic Bilbao	1–0	Real Madrid	Bilbao
	Valverde 78'	Report		Stadium: San Mamés

29 December 1990 16	Real Madrid	0–4	CA Osasuna	Madrid
		Report	Urban 17' (37), 52'; Larrainzer 56'	Stadium: Santiago Bernabeu

5 January 1991 17	Sporting Gijón	0–2	Real Madrid	Gijón
		Report	Míchel 31'; Butragueno 80'	Stadium: El Molinon

11 January 1991 18	Real Madrid	0–3	Atlético Madrid	Madrid
		Report	Manolo 5'; Juanito 30'; Rodax 86'	Stadium: Santiago Bernabeu

18 January 1991 19	FC Barcelona	2–1	Real Madrid	Barcelona
	Laudrup 18'; Spasić 62og.'	Report	Butragueno 28'	Stadium: Camp Nou

26 January 1991 20	CD Castellón	0–3	Real Madrid	Castellón de la Plana
		Report	Sánchez 1pen.' Butragueno 40'; Hagi 69pen.'	Stadium: Nou Estadi Castàlia

2 February 1991 21	Real Madrid	7–0	Sevilla FC	Madrid
	Tendillo 18'; Butragueno 30'; Míchel 54' (69); Gordillo 58'; Hierro 60'; Aragon 72pen.'	Report		Stadium: Santiago Bernabeu; Referee: Jose Socorro Gonzalez

9 February 1991 22	RCD Mallorca	1–1	Real Madrid	Palma
	Nadal 19'	Report	Sánchez 75'	Stadium: Lluís Sitjar; Referee: Joaquin Urio Velazquez

23 February 1991 23	Real Madrid	2–0	Real Zaragoza	Madrid
	Sanchís 15'; Losada 27'	Report		Stadium: Santiago Bernabeu; Referee: José Pajarez Paz

1 March 1991 24	Cádiz CF	1–0	Real Madrid	Cádiz
	González 1pen.'	Report		Stadium: Ramón de Carranza; Referee: Jose Miguel Perez

9 March 1991 25	Real Madrid	2–3	Real Sociedad	Madrid
	Gordillo 40'; Míchel 89'	Report	Martinez 17'; Aldridge 25'; Uria 89'	Stadium: Santiago Bernabeu

15 March 1991 26	CD Logroñés	1–0	Real Madrid	Logroño
	Aguila 17'	Report		Stadium: Las Gaunas

23 March 1991 27	Real Madrid	1–1	Real Oviedo	Madrid
	Butragueno 51'	Report	Carlos 46'	Stadium: Santiago Bernabeu

30 March 1991 28	Real Madrid	0–1	Real Burgos	Madrid
		Report	Edu 54'	Stadium: Santiago Bernabeu

6 April 1991 29	RCD Espanyol	3–1	Real Madrid	Barcelona
	Wuttke 34pen' (89); Gay 86'	Report	Hagi 65'	Stadium: Sarrià

13 April 1991 30	Real Madrid	4–0	Valencia CF	Madrid
	Hagi 17'; Hierro 50' (89); Maqueda 86'	Report		Stadium: Santiago Bernabeu

19 April 1991 31	Real Betis	1–3	Real Madrid	Seville
	Pepe Mel 89pen.'	Report	Butragueno 4'; Hierro 60' (73)	Stadium: Benito Villamarin

27 April 1991 32	Real Madrid	1–0	Real Valladolid	Madrid
	Butragueno 70'	Report		Stadium: Santiago Bernabeu

4 May 1991 33	CD Tenerife	0–1	Real Madrid	Santa Cruz
		Report	Míchel 31pen.'	Stadium: Heliodoro Rodriguez

10 May 1991 34	Real Madrid	4–1	Athletic Bilbao	Madrid
	Hierro 31'; Míchel 35'; Butragueno 60' (82)	Report	Garitano 38'	Stadium: Santiago Bernabeu

18 May 1991 35	CA Osasuna	3–3	Real Madrid	Pamplona
	Larrainzer 16'; Ziganda 41'; Cholo 53'	Report	Butragueno 11'; Dominguez 62og.' Hierro 89'	Stadium: El Sadar

24 May 1991 36	Real Madrid	2–1	Sporting Gijón	Madrid
	Butragueno 27' (37)	Report	Luhovy 57'	Stadium: Santiago Bernabeu

1 June 1991 37	Atlético Madrid	0–3	Real Madrid	Madrid
		Report	Míchel 78'; Butragueno 85' (89)	Stadium: Vicente Calderon

7 June 1991 38	Real Madrid	1–0	FC Barcelona	Madrid
	Aldana 47'	Report		Stadium: Santiago Bernabeu

=== Copa del Rey ===
==== Round of 16 ====
7 February 1991	Real Madrid	1–1	Atlético Madrid	Madrid
	Hugo Sánchez 55'		36' Rodax	Stadium: Santiago Bernabeu; Referee: Ramos Marco

20 February 1991	Atlético Madrid	1–0	Real Madrid	Madrid
	Donato 56'			Stadium: Vicente Calderon; Referee: Ansuategui Roca

=== Supercopa de España ===
5 December 1990 1	FC Barcelona	0–1	Real Madrid	Camp Nou
		Report	54' Míchel	Referee: Urizar Azpitarte

12 December 1990 2	Real Madrid	4–1	FC Barcelona	Estadio Santiago Bernabéu
	Butragueño 21', 44'; Hugo Sánchez 56'; Aragón 70'	Report	20' Goicoechea	Referee: Urio Velázquez

=== European Cup ===
==== First round ====
17 September 1990 1	OB (Denmark)	1–4	(Spain) Real Madrid	Odense
	Pedersen 22'	Report	Aldana 18'; Sánchez 26'; Villarroya 83'; Maqueda 87'	Stadium: Odense Atletikstadion

2 October 1990 2	Real Madrid (Spain)	6–0 (10–1 agg.)	(Denmark) OB	Madrid
	Losada 16' (55), 74'; Míchel 35pen.' Aldana 46' (81)	Report		Stadium: Estadio Santiago Bernabéu

==== Second round ====
24 October 1990 1	Real Madrid (Spain)	9–1	(Austria) Swarovski Tirol	Madrid
	Butragueno 4' (31), 48'; Sánchez 7' (13), 73' (85); Hierro 37'; Tendillo 80'	Report	Pacult 16'	Stadium: Estadio Santiago Bernabéu

6 November 1990 2	Swarovski Tirol (Austria)	2–2 (3–11 agg.)	(Spain) Real Madrid	Innsbruck
	Hortnagl 13'; Linzmaier 90'	Report	Losada 33' (44)	Stadium: Tivoli

==== Quarter-finals ====
5 March 1991 1	Spartak Moscow (Soviet Union)	0–0	(Spain) Real Madrid	Moscow
		Report		Stadium: Central Lenin Stadium

19 March 1991 2	Real Madrid (Spain)	1–3 (1–3 agg.)	(Soviet Union) Spartak Moscow	Madrid
	Butragueno 9'		Radchenko 19' (38); Shmarov 63'	Stadium: Estadio Santiago Bernabéu

== Statistics ==
=== Appearances and goals ===
During the 1990–91 season, Real Madrid used 26 different players comprising five nationalities. The table below shows the number of appearances and goals scored by each player.

No.	Pos	Nat	Player	Total		La Liga		Copa del Rey		European Cup	
No.	Pos	Nat	Player	Apps	Goals	Apps	Goals	Apps	Goals	Apps	Goals
	GK	(Spain) ESP	Buyo	33	0	31	0	0	0	2	0
	DF	(Spain) ESP	Chendo	43	0	36	0	2	0	5	0
	DF	(Spain) ESP	Tendillo	31	3	20+4	2	2	0	5	1
	DF	(Spain) ESP	Sanchis	34	2	30+1	2	2	0	1	0
	DF	(Socialist Federal Republic of Yugoslavia) YUG	Predrag Spasić	24	0	22	0	0	0	2	0
	MF	(Romania) ROU	Gheorghe Hagi	33	4	25+4	4	0	0	4	0
	MF	(Spain) ESP	Míchel	44	9	35+1	8	2	0	6	1
	MF	(Spain) ESP	Fernando Hierro	41	8	33+2	7	1	0	5	1
	MF	(Spain) ESP	Aldana	38	4	13+18	1	2	0	5	3
	MF	(Spain) ESP	Villarroya	44	1	32+4	0	2	0	6	1
	FW	(Spain) ESP	Butragueño	41	23	35	19	2	0	4	4
	GK	(Spain) ESP	Pedro Jaro	14	0	7+1	0	2	0	4	0
	DF	(Spain) ESP	Solana	33	0	23+3	0	2	0	5	0
	MF	(Spain) ESP	Maqueda	27	2	19+5	1	0	0	3	1
	FW	(Mexico) MEX	Hugo Sánchez	23	18	19	12	1	1	3	5
	MF	(Spain) ESP	Santi Aragon	24	1	13+4	1	2	0	5	0
	MF	(Spain) ESP	Rafael Gordillo	16	2	8+4	2	2	0	2	0
	FW	(Spain) ESP	Losada	16	7	6+6	2	0	0	4	5
	FW	(Spain) ESP	Paco Llorente	9	0	6	0	1	0	2	0
	FW	(Spain) ESP	Alfonso Pérez	10	0	5+4	0	1	0	0	0
	MF	(Spain) ESP	Luis Milla	6	0	3+3	0	0	0	0	0
	FW	(Argentina) ARG	Juan Esnáider	2	0	2	0	0	0	0	0
	MF	(Spain) ESP	Joaquin Parra	5	0	2	0	0	0	3	0
	DF	(Spain) ESP	Torres-Mestre	2	0	2	0	0	0	0	0
	FW	(Spain) ESP	Ismael Urzaiz	1	0	0	0	0	0	1	0
	GK	(Spain) ESP	Lopetegui	0	0	0	0	0	0	0	0

- Source: https://www.bdfutbol.com/en/t/t1990-912.html
