= Julio Salinas =

Spanish footballer

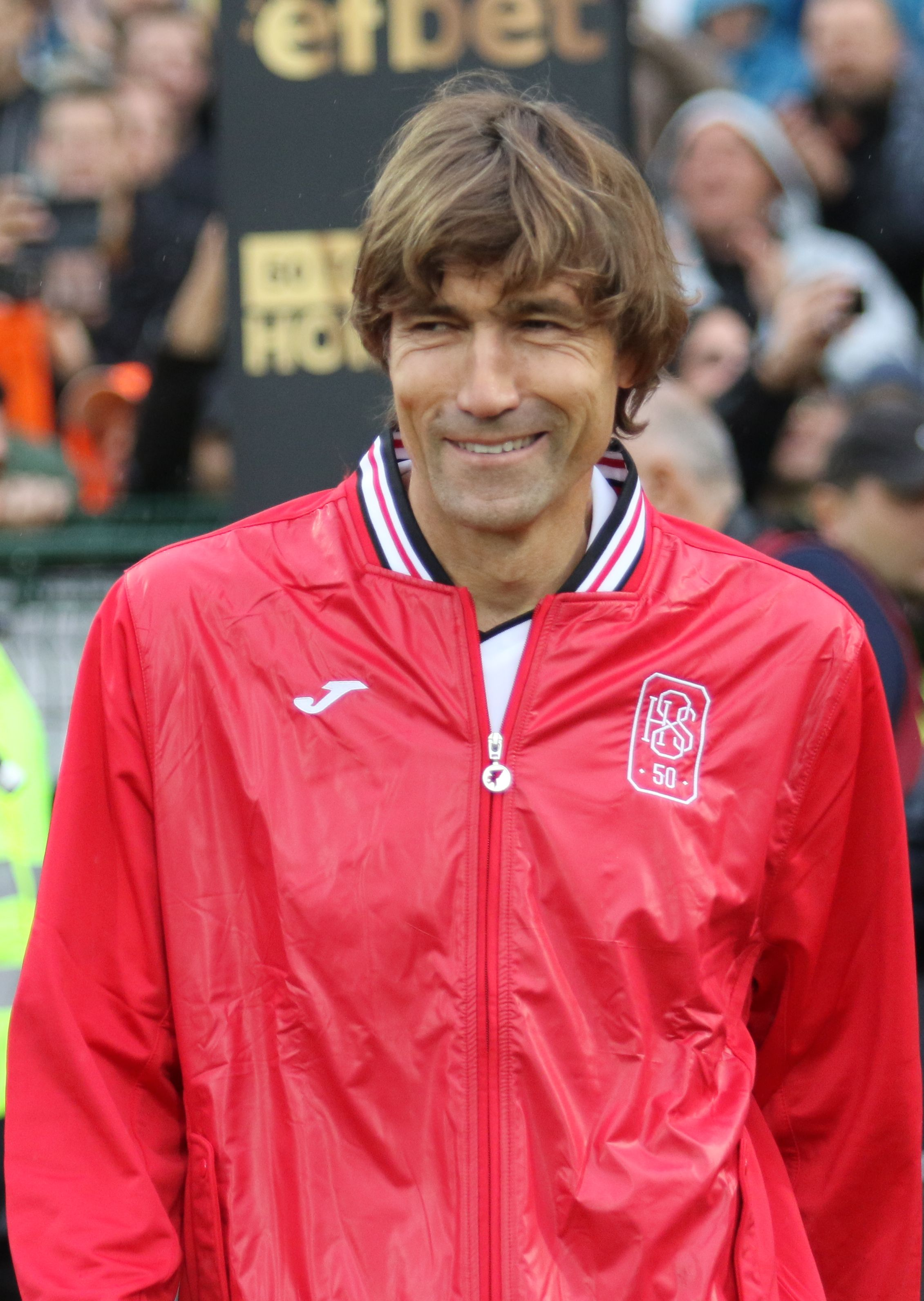
- Salinas in 2016

Personal information
- Full name: Julio Salinas Fernández
- Date of birth: 11 September 1962 (age 64)
- Place of birth: Bilbao, Spain
- Height: 1.88 m (6 ft 2 in)
- Position: Centre-forward

Youth career
- 1974–1981: Athletic Bilbao

Senior career*
Years	Team	Apps	(Gls)
1981–1984	Bilbao Athletic	93	(60)
1982–1986	Athletic Bilbao	68	(13)
1986–1988	Atlético Madrid	75	(31)
1988–1994	Barcelona	146	(60)
1994–1995	Deportivo La Coruña	24	(12)
1995–1996	Sporting Gijón	54	(24)
1997–1998	Yokohama Marinos	47	(34)
1998–2000	Alavés	50	(12)
Total		557	(246)

International career
1983–1984	Spain U21	7	(3)
1986–1996	Spain	56	(22)
- * Club domestic league appearances and goals

Julio Salinas Fernández (Spanish pronunciation: [ˈxuljo saˈlinas feɾˈnandeθ]; born 11 September 1962) is a Spanish former professional footballer who played during the 1980s and 1990s.

A centre-forward with skills, he was best remembered for his spell with Barcelona – having started out at Athletic Bilbao – while he was also a prolific goalscorer for club and country. He also spent one year of his 19-year career in Japan with Yokohama Marinos.

Salinas earned 56 caps for Spain, and represented the nation in three World Cups and two European Championships.

== Club career ==
=== Athletic and Atlético ===
Salinas was born in Bilbao, Biscay, joining Athletic Bilbao's youth academy at the age of 11. In 1983–84, he won the Segunda División's Pichichi Trophy award as he helped the reserves to finish runners-up to Castilla. He also played 13 games for the first team over two seasons, scoring his first La Liga goal on 26 March 1983 in a 4–0 home win against Celta de Vigo as the Basques captured back-to-back league titles and added the 1984 Copa del Rey.

After two more seasons with Athletic, scoring a total of 12 goals for two-third-place finishes, Salinas moved to Atlético Madrid, where he found the net at an impressive rate (this included a brace on 7 February 1988 in a 7–0 home thrashing of Mallorca).

=== Barcelona ===
Salinas signed for Barcelona for 1988–89, linking up with several other Basque players, including veteran José Ramón Alexanko, José Mari Bakero, Txiki Begiristain and Jon Andoni Goikoetxea – these would help form the backbone of the legendary Dream Team. He scored 20 league goals in his debut campaign as Barça finished second to Real Madrid, and he also netted in both the 1989 Cup Winners' Cup final against Sampdoria and in the following year's domestic cup 2–0 victory over Real Madrid.

In the subsequent seasons, Salinas appeared sparingly for the club due to his age and the signing of attacking players as Hristo Stoichkov, but would still manage to grab some important goals in spite of limited playing time. On 30 January 1994, after coming in as a second-half substitute against Albacete, he scored both goals in a 2–1 home win, as he only played six games more during the campaign, with Barcelona eventually achieving four league titles in a row.

=== Later career ===
Upon leaving Catalonia, Salinas joined Deportivo de La Coruña, helping to a runner-up finish in his only season; although not a regular in the starting lineups he finished with 12 league goals, only surpassed by club great Bebeto. As a late replacement at the Camp Nou on 3 December, he netted in a 1–1 draw after a header from José Luis Ribera.

After the signing of, among others, Russian Dmitry Radchenko, Salinas was deemed surplus to requirements, agreeing to a contract at Sporting de Gijón where he scored 18 times in the 1995–96 campaign, crucial in helping the Asturians to avoid relegation. He was held in high regards in the city during his one-and-a-half-year spell, with the fans often singing: "Bota de oro, Salinas bota de oro!" ("Golden boot, Salinas, golden boot!").

Salinas then had a stint abroad with Yokohama Marinos in Japan, where he again showcased his scoring skills, rejoining his former Barcelona teammate Goikoetxea. He then returned close to home, having spent his last two seasons with Alavés where he scored in 1999–2000's opener, a 2–1 home defeat of Málaga; his team finished sixth, and would go on to reach the following year's UEFA Cup final.

On 19 May 2000, Salinas played his last professional match, scoring in a 2–1 loss at his first team Athletic Bilbao. He retired at nearly 38 with 417 matches and 152 goals, in the Spanish top flight alone.

== International career ==
Salinas represented the Spain national team over a decade, scoring 22 goals. His debut was on 22 January 1986 as he netted in a 2–0 friendly win over the Soviet Union, in Las Palmas.

Salinas went on to represent the country at three FIFA World Cups: 1986 (where he scored against Northern Ireland), 1990 (netting in the second-round loss to Yugoslavia) and 1994, as well as two UEFA European Championships, 1988 and 1996.

In the 1994 World Cup quarter-final against Italy, after he had found the net in a 2–2 draw against South Korea, Salinas missed the chance to put Spain into the last-four stage. With 1–1 and less than ten minutes to go, he marred a fast-break, with only goalkeeper Gianluca Pagliuca to beat; Roberto Baggio sealed the 2–1 final result minutes later, and the Spaniard was ultimately more remembered for this miss rather than the massive number of goals scored during an 18-year professional career.

== Post-retirement ==
Immediately after retiring, Salinas began working as a sports commentator, first for RTVE and then on laSexta.

== Personal life ==
Salinas' younger brother, Patxi, was also a professional footballer (centre-back), and played for Athletic Bilbao and Celta. Both made their top division debut in the 1982–83 season.

They held the record for combined appearances in the Spanish top tier by siblings with 849 matches (occasions where they both played as teammates or opponents counted for each), 86 more than the next pair, Quini and Jesús Castro.

== Career statistics ==
=== Club ===
Appearances and goals by club, season and competition
Club	Season	League			National cup		League cup		Continental		Total	
Club	Season	Division	Apps	Goals	Apps	Goals	Apps	Goals	Apps	Goals	Apps	Goals
Athletic Bilbao	1982–83	La Liga	7	1	6	3	4	0	0	0	17	4
Athletic Bilbao	1983–84	La Liga	6	0	2	2	2	1	0	0	10	3
Athletic Bilbao	1984–85	La Liga	28	8	10	4	1	0	1	1	40	14
Athletic Bilbao	1985–86	La Liga	27	4	6	2	0	0	3	3	36	9
Athletic Bilbao	Total		68	13	24	12	7	1	4	4	103	30
Atlético Madrid	1986–87	La Liga	38	15	6	2	–		3	1	47	18
Atlético Madrid	1987–88	La Liga	37	16	5	2	–		–		42	18
Atlético Madrid	Total		75	31	11	4	0	0	3	1	89	36
Barcelona	1988–89	La Liga	37	20	5	4	–		7	2	49	26
Barcelona	1989–90	La Liga	34	15	7	2	–		4	1	45	18
Barcelona	1990–91	La Liga	33	11	4	4	–		8	2	45	17
Barcelona	1991–92	La Liga	17	7	2	0	–		5	2	24	9
Barcelona	1992–93	La Liga	18	5	5	5	–		3	0	26	10
Barcelona	1993–94	La Liga	7	2	4	2	–		1	0	12	4
Barcelona	Total		146	60	27	17	0	0	28	7	201	84
Deportivo	1994–95	La Liga	24	12	4	4	–		4	0	32	16
Sporting Gijón	1995–96	La Liga	38	18	4	4	–		–		42	22
Sporting Gijón	1996–97	La Liga	16	6	2	0					18	6
Sporting Gijón	Total		54	24	6	4	0	0	0	0	60	28
Yokohama Marinos	1997	J1 League	26	21	2	2	5	3	–		33	26
Yokohama Marinos	1998	J1 League	21	13	0	0	3	1	–		24	14
Yokohama Marinos	Total		47	34	2	2	8	4	–		57	40
Alavés	1998–99	La Liga	22	4	0	0	–		–		22	4
Alavés	1999–2000	La Liga	28	8	2	0	–		–		30	8
Alavés	Total		50	12	2	0	0	0	0	0	52	12
Career total			464	186	76	43	15	5	39	12	594	246

=== International ===
Appearances and goals by national team and year
National team	Year	Apps	Goals
Spain	1986	10	5
Spain	1987	2	0
Spain	1988	8	1
Spain	1989	4	1
Spain	1990	5	1
Spain	1991	0	0
Spain	1992	1	0
Spain	1993	8	7
Spain	1994	12	7
Spain	1995	4	0
Spain	1996	2	0
Total		56	22

Scores and results list Spain's goal tally first, score column indicates score after each Salinas goal.

List of international goals scored by Julio Salinas
No.	Date	Venue	Opponent	Score	Result	Competition
1	22 January 1986	Estadio Gran Canaria, Las Palmas, Spain	Soviet Union	1–0	2–0	Friendly
2	19 February 1986	Manuel Martínez Valero, Elche, Spain	Belgium	2–0	3–0	Friendly
3	26 March 1986	Ramón de Carranza, Cádiz, Spain	Poland	3–0	3–0	Friendly
4	7 June 1986	Tres de Marzo, Zapopan, Mexico	Northern Ireland	2–0	2–1	1986 FIFA World Cup
5	24 September 1986	El Molinón, Gijón, Spain	Greece	1–0	3–1	Friendly
6	24 February 1988	La Rosaleda, Málaga, Spain	Czechoslovakia	1–0	1–2	Friendly
7	11 October 1989	Népstadion, Budapest, Hungary	Hungary	1–0	2–2	1990 World Cup qualification
8	26 June 1990	Marc'Antonio Bentegodi, Verona, Italy	Yugoslavia	1–1	1–2	1990 FIFA World Cup
9	28 April 1993	Benito Villamarín, Seville, Spain	Northern Ireland	1–1	3–1	1994 World Cup qualification
10	28 April 1993	Benito Villamarín, Seville, Spain	Northern Ireland	2–1	3–1	1994 World Cup qualification
11	22 September 1993	Qemal Stafa, Tirana, Albania	Albania	1–0	5–1	1994 World Cup qualification
12	22 September 1993	Qemal Stafa, Tirana, Albania	Albania	3–0	5–1	1994 World Cup qualification
13	22 September 1993	Qemal Stafa, Tirana, Albania	Albania	4–1	5–1	1994 World Cup qualification
14	13 October 1993	Lansdowne Road, Dublin, Republic of Ireland	Republic of Ireland	2–0	3–1	1994 World Cup qualification
15	13 October 1993	Lansdowne Road, Dublin, Republic of Ireland	Republic of Ireland	3–0	3–1	1994 World Cup qualification
16	19 January 1994	Balaídos, Vigo, Spain	Portugal	1–0	2–2	Friendly
17	2 June 1994	Ratina Stadion, Tampere, Finland	Finland	2–0	2–1	Friendly
18	10 June 1994	Claude-Robillard, Montreal, Canada	Canada	1–0	2–0	Friendly
19	17 June 1994	Cotton Bowl, Dallas, United States	South Korea	1–0	2–2	1994 FIFA World Cup
20	12 October 1994	City Stadium of Skopje, Skopje, Macedonia	North Macedonia	1–0	2–0	Euro 1996 qualifying
21	12 October 1994	City Stadium of Skopje, Skopje, Macedonia	North Macedonia	2–0	2–0	Euro 1996 qualifying
22	17 December 1994	Constant Vanden Stock, Brussels, Belgium	Belgium	3–1	4–1	Euro 1996 qualifying

== Honours ==
Athletic Bilbao

- La Liga: 1982–83, 1983–84
- Copa del Rey: 1983–84
- Supercopa de España: 1984 (automatically awarded after winning the double)

Barcelona

- La Liga: 1990–91, 1991–92, 1992–93, 1993–94
- Copa del Rey: 1989–90
- Supercopa de España: 1991, 1992
- European Cup: 1991–92
- UEFA Cup Winners' Cup: 1988–89
- European Super Cup: 1992

Deportivo

- Copa del Rey: 1994–95

Spain Under-21

- UEFA Under-21 European Championship runner-up: 1984

Individual

- Pichichi Trophy: 1983–84 (Segunda División)

== See also ==
- List of FC Barcelona players (100+ appearances)
- List of La Liga players (400+ appearances)
