= Jesús Angoy =

Spanish footballer and American football placekicker

Personal information
- Full name: Jesús Mariano Angoy Gil
- Date of birth: 2 May 1966 (age 60)
- Place of birth: Alagón, Spain
- Height: 1.75 m (5 ft 9 in)
- Position: Goalkeeper

Youth career
- 1978–1979: CD Alagón
- 1979–1984: CD Calasanz de Escolapios

Senior career*
| Years | Team | Apps | (Gls) |
| 1984–1985 | UD Barbastro | | |
| 1985–1987 | Atlético Calatayud | | |
| 1987–1988 | Barcelona C | 21 | (0) |
| 1988–1995 | Barcelona B | 164 | (0) |
| 1989–1990 | → Logroñés (loan) | 3 | (0) |
| 1995–1996 | Barcelona | 11 | (0) |
| 1996–1997 | Cordoba | 4 | (0) |
| 2006 | CE Europa | | |

Managerial career
- 2010–2014: CE Europa
- 2004–2015: L'Hospitalet
- 2016: CE Morell
- * Club domestic league appearances and goals

Jesús Mariano Angoy Gil (born 22 May 1966) is a Spanish retired sportsman who played association football as a goalkeeper, and American football as a placekicker.

He appeared in nine La Liga matches for his main club Barcelona over five seasons, being mostly third-choice.

== Football ==
Born in Alagón, Zaragoza, Angoy was a product of FC Barcelona's youth ranks. He made his professional debut with CD Logroñés however, and, already well in his 20s, spent several seasons with the Catalans' B-team, playing three years in the second division.

After the departure of legendary Andoni Zubizarreta and prior to the arrival of Vítor Baía, Angoy profited from some injuries to first-choice Carles Busquets to appear in nine La Liga matches. As the 1995–96 campaign drew to a close, both him and manager Johan Cruyff (whose daughter was married to the player) left the club; after an unassuming spell at Córdoba CF, he retired from football.

== American football ==
Angoy spent seven years (1996–2003) at NFL Europe side Barcelona Dragons's kicker, then switched to Badalona Dracs from the LNFA and then to Italy with the Bergamo Lions (IFL). In 1999, he had an unsuccessful trial with the Denver Broncos, the reigning champions of the National Football League.

Three years later, Angoy was selected to NFL Europe's All-Offensive team.
