= Sebastián Herrera (footballer, born 1969) =

Spanish footballer

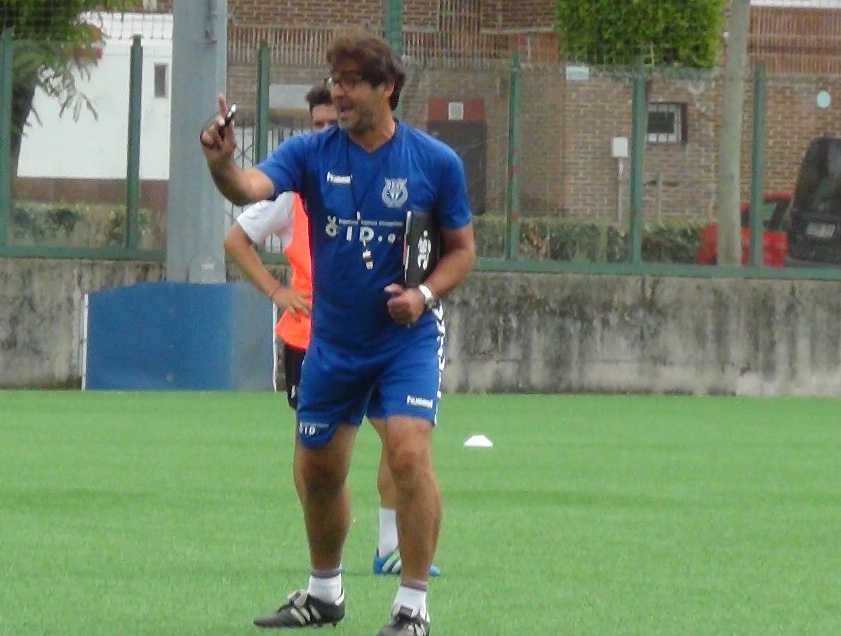
- Herrera coaching Rayo Cantabria

Personal information
- Full name: Sebastián Herrera Zamora
- Date of birth: 22 April 1969 (age 57)
- Place of birth: Copenhagen, Denmark
- Height: 1.84 m (6 ft 0 in)
- Position: Centre-back

Youth career
- 1977–1980: Bellvitge Norte
- 1980–1987: Barcelona

Senior career*
Years	Team	Apps	(Gls)
1987–1989	Barcelona C	56	(1)
1989–1993	Barcelona B	73	(2)
1991–1994	Barcelona	1	(0)
1991–1992	→ Mallorca (loan)	18	(1)
1992–1993	→ Burgos (loan)	24	(1)
1993–1994	→ Lleida (loan)	27	(1)
1994–1997	Espanyol	106	(0)
1997–1999	Las Palmas	71	(1)
1999–2000	Logroñés	35	(1)
2000–2002	Farense	45	(0)
2002–2005	Gavà	36	(0)
2005–2006	Santboià		
2007–2008	Gimnàstica Iberiana		
Total		495	(8)

International career
1984–1985	Spain U16	4	(0)
1986	Spain U18	1	(0)
1990	Catalonia	1	(0)
- * Club domestic league appearances and goals

Sebastián Herrera Zamora (born 22 April 1969) is a Spanish former professional footballer who played as a central defender.

He amassed La Liga totals of 176 games and three goals over seven seasons, representing Barcelona, Mallorca, Burgos, Lleida and Espanyol. He added 117 matches and three goals in the Segunda División, in a 21-year senior career where he also competed in Portugal.

== Club career ==
Herrera was born in Copenhagen, Denmark to Spanish parents, at the time working in the country. He graduated from FC Barcelona's La Masia, after joining their youth system at the age of 11.

During the 1990–91 season, after making his senior debut with the reserves and the third team, manager Johann Cruyff allowed Herrera to appear in five competitive games with the main squad. His debut occurred on 5 December 1990 in a 1–0 home loss against Real Madrid in the Supercopa de España, and he also started in the second leg which ended with a 4–1 defeat. On 5 May 1991, as they had already been crowned champions, he played his first match in La Liga, coming on as a late substitute for Michael Laudrup in a 2–1 home win over Real Zaragoza.

Herrera spent the following three campaigns on loan, being relegated from the top division with RCD Mallorca, Real Burgos CF and UE Lleida; in between those spells, he was demoted to Barcelona's B team. He scored his first goal in the competition on 3 November 1991, but in a 2–1 home defeat to Athletic Bilbao.

In the summer of 1994, 25-year-old Herrera moved across the Camp Nou and signed with RCD Español – soon to be renamed Espanyol. He rarely missed a league match with his new club, often partnering Argentine Mauricio Pochettino in the centre of the defence; at the end of 1994–95, in which he started in all his 36 appearances to help to a sixth-place finish straight out of Segunda División, he was voted Defender of the Year by magazine Don Balón.

Even though he still had a contract running, in 1997 Herrera asked to be released alleging personal reasons, and moved to the Canary Islands with UD Las Palmas for 125 million pesetas. Subsequently, he represented fellow second-tier side CD Logroñés.

After a spell in the Portuguese Primeira Liga with S.C. Farense, being briefly coached by compatriot Paco Fortes and also suffering a serious knee injury early into his second year, which ended in relegation, Herrera returned to Spain and played exclusively in lower league or amateur football, retiring at 39. He subsequently worked as a coach, with Espanyol's youths and Deportivo Rayo Cantabria.

== Honours ==
Barcelona

- La Liga: 1990–91

Individual

- Don Balón Award: Best Centre-back 1994–95
