= Francisco Villarroya =

Spanish footballer (born 1966)

Personal information
- Full name: Francisco Javier Pérez Villarroya
- Date of birth: 6 August 1966 (age 60)
- Place of birth: Zaragoza, Spain
- Height: 1.80 m (5 ft 11 in)
- Position: Midfielder

Youth career
- Zaragoza

Senior career*
Years	Team	Apps	(Gls)
1984–1988	Deportivo Aragón	75	(1)
1984–1990	Zaragoza	100	(6)
1990–1994	Real Madrid	83	(1)
1994–1996	Deportivo La Coruña	42	(0)
1996–1998	Sporting Gijón	51	(2)
1998–1999	Badajoz	19	(1)
Total		370	(11)

International career
1989–1992	Spain	14	(0)
- * Club domestic league appearances and goals

Francisco Javier Pérez Villarroya (born 6 August 1966) is a Spanish former footballer who played mostly as a left midfielder.

== Club career ==
Born in Zaragoza, Villarroya made his professional debut with hometown's Real Zaragoza, appearing in one La Liga game in the 1984–85 season (a 4–0 away loss against FC Barcelona) but being almost exclusively connected with the reserves for three years.

In the summer of 1990, after helping the Aragonese to two consecutive top-ten finishes in the top division – fifth in the 1988–89 campaign, with the subsequent qualification for the UEFA Cup – whilst only missing a total of two matches, he signed with Real Madrid, being occasionally utilised as left-back during his four-year spell and being the capital side's first choice prior to the signing of Brazilian Roberto Carlos, battling for the position with Mikel Lasa.

After just 13 league appearances in his last two years at the Santiago Bernabéu Stadium, following the arrival of manager Benito Floro, Villarroya joined Deportivo de La Coruña, being relatively used and adding another Copa del Rey to his trophy cabinet. Still in the top tier, he then represented Sporting de Gijón, suffering relegation at the end of his second season.

Villarroya closed out his career at the age of 32 after one year with CD Badajoz in the Segunda División, amassing top-flight totals of 276 matches and nine goals over 14 seasons.

== International career ==
Villarroya earned 14 caps for the Spain national team in two and a half years, and was in the squad for the 1990 FIFA World Cup in Italy, playing all the games (mostly in the back sector) in an eventual round-of-16 exit.

His debut came on 20 September 1989 in a 1–0 friendly win over Poland in A Coruña, featuring the full 90 minutes as a Zaragoza player.

== Personal life ==
Villarroya's nephew, Ángel Lafita, was also a footballer (and a midfielder). He played the vast majority of his career with Zaragoza and Deportivo.

== Career statistics ==
=== International ===
Appearances and goals by national team and year
National team	Year	Apps	Goals
Spain	1989	4	0
Spain	1990	7	0
Spain	1991	1	0
Spain	1992	2	0
Total		14	0

== Honours ==
Real Madrid

- Copa del Rey: 1992–93
- Supercopa de España: 1990

Deportivo

- Copa del Rey: 1994–95
