= Álex García (footballer, born 1970) =

Spanish footballer and manager (born 1970)

Personal information
- Full name: Alejandro García Casañas
- Date of birth: 14 January 1970 (age 56)
- Place of birth: Barcelona, Spain
- Height: 1.80 m (5 ft 11 in)
- Position: Centre back

Youth career
- 1984–1988: Barcelona

Senior career*
Years	Team	Apps	(Gls)
1987–1989	Barcelona C	36	(3)
1988–1995	Barcelona B	118	(5)
1993–1994	→ Rayo Vallecano (loan)	22	(0)
1994–1995	→ Palamós (loan)	32	(0)
1995–1998	Cádiz	68	(0)
1998–1999	Granada	31	(0)
1999–2000	Gimnàstic	6	(0)
2000–2001	Cornellà		
Total		313	(8)

International career
1987–1988	Spain U18	5	(0)
1988–1989	Spain U19	3	(0)
1989–1990	Spain U20	2	(0)
1990–1992	Spain U21	5	(0)
1991–1992	Spain U23	3	(0)

Managerial career
- 2001–2003: Barcelona (youth)
- 2003–2005: Catalonia U18
- 2005–2009: Barcelona (youth)
- 2011–2012: Dinamo Tbilisi
- 2014–2015: Sabadell
- 2022–2024: Las Palmas (assistant)
- 2024–2025: Sevilla (assistant)
- * Club domestic league appearances and goals

Alejandro "Álex" García Casañas (born 14 January 1970) is a Spanish retired professional footballer who played as a central defender, and a current manager.

He was associated to Barcelona during his early years – although he appeared rarely for the first team – but spent most of his career in the lower leagues, representing Rayo Vallecano in La Liga.

Subsequently, García worked as a manager, including with his first club (youth only).

== Playing career ==
Born in Barcelona, Catalonia, García joined FC Barcelona's youth system at the age of 14. He played two full seasons in Segunda División with their reserves, after having appeared in one game in that tier in 1988–89.

In the 1990–91 campaign, García played three matches for the Blaugrana's main squad, both legs in the season's Supercopa de España against Real Madrid (0–1 home loss, 1–4 defeat at the Santiago Bernabéu Stadium, playing the full 90 minutes on both occasions) and 28 minutes in a 3–2 away win over FC Dynamo Kyiv in the UEFA Cup Winners' Cup, after coming on as a second-half substitute for Michael Laudrup; after leaving in 1993 he resumed his career with Rayo Vallecano and Palamós CF, suffering team relegation with both clubs, the former being his first and only experience in the top level, in 1993–94.

Until his retirement in 2001 at the age of 31, García spent five seasons in Segunda División B, with Cádiz CF, Granada CF and Gimnàstic de Tarragona, returning to his native region for one final year with amateurs UE Cornellà.

== Coaching career ==
García begun working as a manager immediately after retiring, first being in charge of youth sides at Barcelona. In late June 2011, nearly two years after leaving, he was appointed at FC Dinamo Tbilisi, replacing the fired Kakha Kacharava.

In January 2012, the board of directors of the Georgian club decided to dismiss García after a friendly loss with BSC Young Boys. He then returned to the Camp Nou, working as a scout for the first team under Tito Vilanova and Gerardo Martino.

On 24 November 2014, García signed a contract until the end of the season at CE Sabadell FC. The following February, however, after only one win in nine second-tier matches, he resigned.

In June 2020, García returned to Barcelona after being named head scout. He left the club roughly one year later, and became García Pimienta's assistant at UD Las Palmas on 24 January 2022.
