= Ricardo Serna =

Spanish footballer and manager

Personal information
- Full name: Ricardo Jesús Serna Orozco
- Date of birth: 21 January 1964 (age 62)
- Place of birth: Seville, Spain
- Height: 1.84 m (6 ft 0 in)
- Position: Defender

Youth career
- Sevilla

Senior career*
Years	Team	Apps	(Gls)
1982–1988	Sevilla	179	(4)
1988–1992	Barcelona	101	(2)
1992–1994	Deportivo La Coruña	1	(0)
1994–1995	Mallorca	16	(1)
1995–1996	Granada	17	(0)
1996–1997	Ceuta		
Total		314	(7)

International career
1982	Spain U18	2	(0)
1982–1986	Spain U21	8	(0)
1987–1988	Spain U23	4	(0)
1983	Spain amateur	2	(0)
1988–1990	Spain	6	(0)

Managerial career
- 2004–2005: IR Tanger
- 2006–2008: Manchego
- 2008: Don Benito
- 2010: Toledo
- * Club domestic league appearances and goals

Ricardo Jesús Serna Orozco (born 21 January 1964) is a Spanish former footballer who played mostly as a central defender.

In 12 La Liga seasons, he appeared in 281 matches for three clubs, scoring six goals and winning six major titles, including the 1992 European Cup with Barcelona.

== Club career ==
Born in Seville, Andalusia, Serna started his professional career at Sevilla FC in 1982 at the age of 18, immediately breaking into the starting lineups. After six years with his local club, he was signed by La Liga giants FC Barcelona for 200 million pesetas.

Serna appeared in 143 competitive games during his spell at the Camp Nou, his only two goals coming on his debut on 2 October 1988 in a 4–0 home win over Sporting de Gijón. He won two national championships, two Copa del Rey, one UEFA Cup Winners' Cup and the 1991–92 European Cup, featuring regularly in the latter tournament but missing the final against UC Sampdoria due to injury. He played sparingly in his final season, where he already had the company of his former Sevilla defensive teammate Nando.

A part of Deportivo de La Coruña's Super Depor emergent sides, Serna totalled just two minutes in two years, retiring in 1997 after one year with RCD Mallorca in the Segunda División another two in the lower leagues.

== International career ==
Serna received his first Spain national team callup on 15 December 1988, for a 1990 FIFA World Cup qualifier against Northern Ireland. Six days later, he came on as a 65th-minute substitute for Txiki Begiristain in the 4–0 victory at the Ramón Sánchez Pizjuán Stadium; he earned a further five caps in a two-year span.

== Honours ==
Barcelona

- La Liga: 1990–91, 1991–92
- Copa del Rey: 1989–90
- Supercopa de España: 1991
- UEFA European Cup: 1991–92
- UEFA Cup Winners' Cup: 1988–89

Spain Under-21

- UEFA Under-21 European Championship runner-up: 1984
