= Andoni Zubizarreta =

Spanish footballer

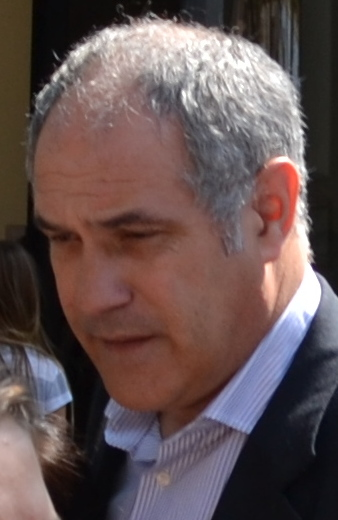
- Zubizarreta in 2013

Personal information
- Full name: Andoni Zubizarreta Urreta
- Date of birth: 23 October 1961 (age 65)
- Place of birth: Vitoria-Gasteiz, Spain
- Height: 1.87 m (6 ft 2 in)
- Position: Goalkeeper

Youth career
- 1976–1978: Aretxabaleta
- 1978–1979: Alavés

Senior career*
Years	Team	Apps	(Gls)
1979–1980	Alavés B	32	(0)
1980–1981	Alavés	0	(0)
1981	Bilbao Athletic	7	(0)
1981–1986	Athletic Bilbao	169	(0)
1986–1994	Barcelona	301	(0)
1994–1998	Valencia	152	(0)
Total		661	(0)

International career
1979–1980	Spain U18	12	(0)
1981	Spain U19	1	(0)
1979–1984	Spain U21	17	(0)
1984	Spain amateur	1	(0)
1985–1998	Spain	126	(0)
1993–1997	Basque Country	4	(0)
- * Club domestic league appearances and goals

Andoni Zubizarreta Urreta (Basque pronunciation: [andoni s̻uβis̻areta ureta], Spanish: [anˈdoni θuβiˈθareta wˈreta]; born 23 October 1961) is a Spanish former professional footballer who played as a goalkeeper.

The most capped player for the Spain national team for several years, he played with individual and team success for Athletic Bilbao and Barcelona (eight years with the latter, he would later work with the club in directorial capacities), taking part in more than 1,000 official matches during his career and holding the records for most appearances (the first Spaniard to achieve the feat, since the time matches are recorded) and clean sheets in La Liga for several years.

Zubizarreta represented Spain in seven major international tournaments, four World Cups and three European Championships, starting in six of those. He won the European Cup with Barcelona in 1992 and six La Liga titles, two with Athletic and four with Barcelona.

== Club career ==
=== Athletic Bilbao ===
Born in Vitoria-Gasteiz, Álava, Zubizarreta spent his childhood in Aretxabaleta in Gipuzkoa, where he began his football career. After a brief passage at another Basque club, Alavés, he joined Athletic Bilbao, where he would spend the following six seasons.

Zubizarreta's debut in La Liga occurred on 19 September 1981 as manager Javier Clemente handed him a start in a 2–0 away loss against Atlético Madrid, one month shy of his 20th birthday. He went on to be an undisputed starter for the remainder of his spell, being an instrumental part in the team's conquests, most notably the back-to-back national championships.

=== Barcelona ===
In 1986, Zubizarreta signed with Barcelona for a record for a player in the position €1.7 million, quickly removing established Urruti from the starting lineup and rarely missing a match afterwards – for example, only four over the Catalans' four consecutive league wins. He added their first ever European Cup in 1992, following a 1–0 win over Sampdoria.

=== Valencia ===
After the 1993–94 UEFA Champions League, where Barça lost 4–0 to AC Milan in the final, Zubizarreta was deemed surplus to requirements and finished his career at Valencia, still playing at a high level. He retired after the 1997–98 campaign at nearly 37, having played in over 1,000 competitive games (622 in the league alone – the all-time record – conceding 626 goals).

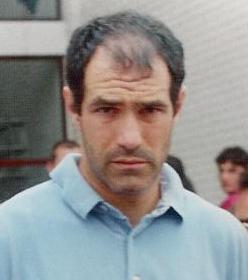
Zubizarreta in 1996

=== Director ===
Zubizarreta was named Barcelona's director of football by president Sandro Rosell on 2 July 2010, taking over from former club and national teammate Txiki Begiristain. Over the previous decade he had served Athletic Bilbao in the same capacity (being involved in the establishment of the club's women's team in 2002), while also working as a radio and television commentator.

On 5 January 2015, Zubizarreta was sacked as Barcelona sporting director by club president Josep Maria Bartomeu. On 27 October 2016, he signed with Ligue 1 side Marseille in the same capacity, leaving four years later by mutual consent.

Following André Villas-Boas' election as president of Porto on 28 April 2024, Zubizarreta became its director of football. In August 2025, he left his post by mutual agreement.

== International career ==
=== Spain ===
Zubizarreta made his debut for Spain on 23 January 1985, in a 3–1 friendly victory over Finland. He went on to collect a further 125 caps in the following 13 years.

Zubizarreta represented the nation in four consecutive FIFA World Cups: 1986, 1990, 1994 and 1998 – his last competition, where he scored an own goal in a 3–2 group stage loss against Nigeria– also appearing, always as a starter, at UEFA Euro 1988 and 1996. He and his deputy Francisco Buyo once held the national team record for the longest unbeaten run in international games, until Iker Casillas and Pepe Reina broke that record in October 2008; he was also surpassed by the former in total of caps on 15 November 2011.

=== Basque Country ===
Zubizarreta played four matches with the unofficial Basque Country regional side.

== Style of play ==
Nicknamed "Zubi" throughout his career, Zubizarreta was regarded as one of the leading goalkeepers of his generation in his prime, and as one of Spain's and Barcelona's greatest and most successful ones. He was known for his consistency, composure and effectiveness, with an excellent positional sense above all things, and was noted for favouring an efficient rather than spectacular style although he was also capable of producing decisive saves due to his good shot-stopping abilities. He also stood out for his intelligence, composure and leadership in goal, which enabled him to organise his back-line and inspire a sense of calm and confidence in his defenders. He was also known for his work-rate and his willingness to come off his line.

In spite of Barcelona's passing-based playing style under Johan Cruyff, which also saw his defenders and goalkeepers given more responsibilities in terms of retaining possession and playing the ball out from the back, Zubizarreta was not particularly adept with the ball at his feet. His limited technical skills were a frequent source of criticism from his manager, and eventually led to the former's departure from the club in 1994.

== Career statistics ==
=== Club ===
Appearances and goals by club, season and competition
Club	Season	League			Copa del Rey		Europe		Other (Note: Includes Supercopa de España, Copa de la Liga and Intercontinental Cup)		Total	
Club	Season	Division	Apps	Goals	Apps	Goals	Apps	Goals	Apps	Goals	Apps	Goals
Alavés B	1979–80	Tercera División	32	0	0	0	–		–		32	0
Bilbao Athletic	1980–81	Segunda División B	7	0	0	0	–		–		7	0
Athletic Bilbao	1981–82	La Liga	34	0	11	0	–		–		45	0
Athletic Bilbao	1982–83	La Liga	34	0	8	0	2	0	4	0	48	0
Athletic Bilbao	1983–84	La Liga	34	0	9	0	4	0	2	0	49	0
Athletic Bilbao	1984–85	La Liga	33	0	12	0	2	0	4	0	51	0
Athletic Bilbao	1985–86	La Liga	34	0	6	0	6	0	0	0	46	0
Athletic Bilbao	Total		169	0	46	0	14	0	10	0	239	0
Barcelona	1986–87	La Liga	44	0	2	0	8	0	–		54	0
Barcelona	1987–88	La Liga	38	0	9	0	8	0	–		55	0
Barcelona	1988–89	La Liga	36	0	2	0	9	0	2	0	49	0
Barcelona	1989–90	La Liga	35	0	7	0	6	0	–		48	0
Barcelona	1990–91	La Liga	38	0	6	0	8	0	2	0	54	0
Barcelona	1991–92	La Liga	38	0	0	0	11	0	2	0	51	0
Barcelona	1992–93	La Liga	38	0	6	0	6	0	3	0	53	0
Barcelona	1993–94	La Liga	34	0	0	0	12	0	0	0	46	0
Barcelona	Total		301	0	32	0	68	0	9	0	410	0
Valencia	1994–95	La Liga	38	0	10	0	–		–		48	0
Valencia	1995–96	La Liga	39	0	8	0	–		–		47	0
Valencia	1996–97	La Liga	41	0	2	0	6	0	–		49	0
Valencia	1997–98	La Liga	34	0	6	0	–		–		40	0
Valencia	Total		152	0	26	0	6	0	0	0	184	0
Career total			661	0	104	0	88	0	19	0	872	0

=== International ===
Appearances and goals by national team and year
National team	Year	Apps	Goals
Spain	1985	6	0
Spain	1986	12	0
Spain	1987	7	0
Spain	1988	13	0
Spain	1989	8	0
Spain	1990	11	0
Spain	1991	8	0
Spain	1992	9	0
Spain	1993	9	0
Spain	1994	13	0
Spain	1995	9	0
Spain	1996	10	0
Spain	1997	6	0
Spain	1998	5	0
Total		126	0

== Honours ==
Athletic Bilbao

- La Liga: 1982–83, 1983–84
- Copa del Rey: 1983–84
- Supercopa de España: 1984

Barcelona

- La Liga: 1990–91, 1991–92, 1992–93, 1993–94
- Copa del Rey: 1987–88, 1989–90
- Supercopa de España: 1991, 1992
- European Cup: 1991–92
- UEFA Cup Winners' Cup: 1988–89
- UEFA Super Cup: 1992

Spain Under-21

- UEFA Under-21 European Championship runner-up: 1984

Individual

- Don Balón Award: 1986–87
- Ricardo Zamora Trophy: 1986–87
- La Liga Team of The Year: 1986–87, 1989–90, 1990–91, 1992–93

== See also ==
- List of men's footballers with 100 or more international caps
- List of men's footballers with the most official appearances
- List of Athletic Bilbao players (+200 appearances)
- List of FC Barcelona players (100+ appearances)
- List of La Liga players (400+ appearances)
