= Eusebio (Spanish footballer) =

Spanish football player and manager

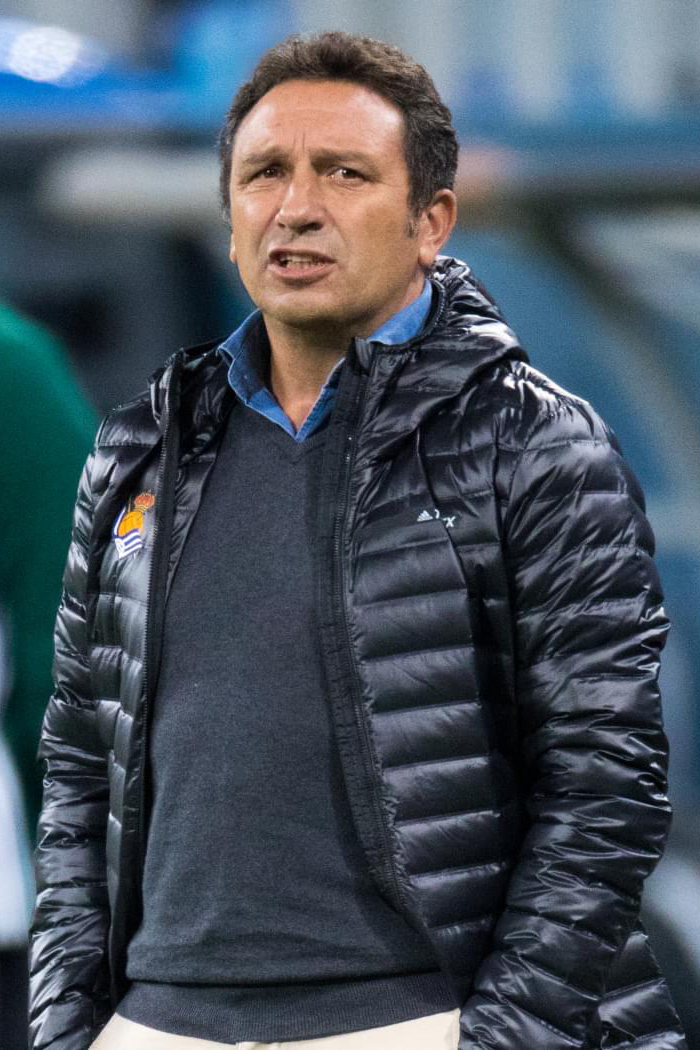
- Eusebio managing Real Sociedad in 2017

Personal information
- Full name: Eusebio Sacristán Mena
- Date of birth: 13 April 1964 (age 62)
- Place of birth: La Seca, Spain
- Height: 1.71 m (5 ft 7 in)
- Position: Midfielder

Youth career
- La Seca
- 1979–1982: Valladolid

Senior career*
Years	Team	Apps	(Gls)
1982–1983	Valladolid B		
1983–1987	Valladolid	117	(13)
1987–1988	Atlético Madrid	27	(3)
1988–1995	Barcelona	203	(14)
1995–1997	Celta	67	(1)
1997–2002	Valladolid	129	(5)
Total		543	(36)

International career
1984–1987	Spain U21	17	(3)
1986–1988	Spain U23	4	(1)
1986–1992	Spain	15	(0)

Managerial career
- 2003–2008: Barcelona (assistant)
- 2009–2010: Celta
- 2011–2015: Barcelona B
- 2015–2018: Real Sociedad
- 2018–2019: Girona
- * Club domestic league appearances and goals

Eusebio Sacristán Mena (Spanish pronunciation: [ewˈseβjo sakɾisˈtan]; born 13 April 1964), known simply as Eusebio in his playing days, is a Spanish former professional footballer who played as a central midfielder. He was also a manager.

He started and ended his 20-year senior career at Real Valladolid, and won an array of domestic and European silverware in his seven seasons at Barcelona. Internationally, he represented Spain at Euro 1988.

Sacristán began working as a coach with Barcelona, and went on to lead Celta, Barcelona B, Real Sociedad and Girona.

== Club career ==
Born in La Seca, Province of Valladolid, Eusebio started playing professionally with Real Valladolid, being first-choice from an early age and moving to Atlético Madrid for 1987–88. After that sole season he signed for FC Barcelona, proceeding to be one of coach Johan Cruyff's most used squad members in the subsequent years – he played the full 90 minutes at both the victorious 1989 Cup Winners' Cup and the 1992 European Cup finals.

Eusebio could only total 36 appearances in his last two seasons, this prompting a move to RC Celta de Vigo in 1995 where he posted two more solid campaigns. He retired in 2002 at the age of 38 with Valladolid, having played 543 La Liga matches (the only division he competed in after being promoted to his first club's first team), third-best in the competition only behind Andoni Zubizarreta and Raúl.

== International career ==
Eusebio earned 15 caps for Spain, the first coming on 24 September 1986 in a friendly with Greece, in Gijón. He was subsequently picked for the final squad at UEFA Euro 1988, taking part in no games as the national team exited in the group stage in West Germany.

== Coaching career ==
Upon retiring, Sacristán opened a football school in Valladolid for 6-to-12-year-old children. He also obtained his coaching degree and, from 2003 to 2008, was part of Frank Rijkaard's staff at Barcelona.

On 2 March 2009, Sacristán was named head coach of another former club, Celta, as the Galician side struggled in the Segunda División. The following season was not any better, as although the team eventually retained their status with ease they struggled until the last month of competition; he was let go when his contract expired in June 2010.

Sacristán returned to Barcelona for 2011–12, being appointed the reserves' manager after Luis Enrique left for AS Roma. He led them to the third position in his third year; however, following a string of poor results, on 9 February 2015 he was relieved of his duties and replaced by youth coach Jordi Vinyals.

On 9 November 2015, Sacristán was named manager of top-flight Real Sociedad after the dismissal of David Moyes. On 18 March 2018, he was himself fired.

On 7 June 2018, Sacristán was appointed at Girona FC, replacing Sevilla FC-bound Pablo Machín. He left by mutual consent in May 2019, after suffering relegation from the top tier.

== Personal life ==
At the end of 2020, Sacristán suffered a severe cranial injury from a fall in Valladolid, and was placed in an induced coma.

== Managerial statistics ==
As of 18 May 2019

Managerial record by team and tenure
Team	Nat	From	To	Record								Ref
Team	Nat	From	To	G	W	D	L	GF	GA	GD	Win %	Ref
Celta	(Spain)	3 March 2009	7 June 2010	66	20	24	22	67	75	−8	30.30	
Barcelona B	(Spain)	17 June 2011	9 February 2015	150	58	34	58	231	214	+17	38.67	
Real Sociedad	(Spain)	9 November 2015	19 March 2018	112	46	23	43	177	165	+12	41.07	
Girona	(Spain)	7 June 2018	20 May 2019	44	10	13	21	48	67	−19	22.73	
Total				372	134	94	144	523	521	+2	36.02	—

== Honours ==
Barcelona

- La Liga: 1990–91, 1991–92, 1992–93, 1993–94
- Copa del Rey: 1989–90
- Supercopa de España: 1991, 1992, 1994
- European Cup: 1991–92
- UEFA Cup Winners' Cup: 1988–89
- UEFA Super Cup: 1992

Valladolid

- Copa de la Liga: 1984

Spain U21

- UEFA European Under-21 Championship: 1986

Individual

- La Liga Manager of the Month: February 2016, November 2016

== See also ==
- List of FC Barcelona players (100+ appearances)
- List of La Liga players (400+ appearances)
