= Pablo Maqueda =

Spanish footballer

Personal information
- Full name: Pablo José Maqueda Andrés
- Date of birth: 18 January 1971 (age 55)
- Place of birth: Barcelona, Spain
- Height: 1.74 m (5 ft 8 1/2 in)
- Position: Forward

Youth career
- Las Planas
- Barcelona

Senior career*
Years	Team	Apps	(Gls)
1990–1993	Barcelona B	54	(13)
1991–1993	Barcelona	3	(0)
1993–1997	Oviedo	71	(11)
1995–1996	→ Mallorca (loan)	30	(10)
1997–1998	Avispa Fukuoka	17	(3)
1998–2000	Lleida	60	(7)
2005–2007	Binissalem	46	(12)
Total		281	(56)
- * Club domestic league appearances and goals

Pablo José Maqueda Andrés (born 18 January 1971) is a Spanish former professional footballer who played as a forward.

== Club career ==
Born in Barcelona, Catalonia, Maqueda started his professional career with FC Barcelona, but only played three La Liga games with the club over two seasons, also spending two years with the reserves in the Segunda División. In the summer of 1993 he joined fellow top-flight side Real Oviedo, being used almost exclusively as a substitute in his first two years.

Following a season-long loan at RCD Mallorca in the second tier, being an essential attacking unit as the team reached the promotion playoffs, eventually losing against Rayo Vallecano, Maqueda returned to Oviedo and experienced his best campaign in the top division, scoring seven goals in 31 matches as the Asturians barely avoided relegation (17th). Subsequently, he moved abroad and signed for Avispa Fukuoka in the J1 League.

After one year in Japan, Maqueda returned to his country and his native region, joining division two club UE Lleida and retiring from professional football aged only 29. In January 2005, he returned to active with amateurs CD Binissalem in Mallorca, and remained with them until the end of 2006–07.
