= Predrag Spasić =

Serbian footballer

Personal information
- Full name: Predrag Spasić
- Date of birth: 13 May 1965 (age 61)
- Place of birth: Kragujevac, SR Serbia, SFR Yugoslavia
- Height: 1.85 m (6 ft 1 in)
- Position: Centre back

Youth career
- 1983-1986: Radnički Kragujevac

Senior career*
Years	Team	Apps	(Gls)
1986–1988	Radnički Kragujevac	32	(2)
1988–1990	Partizan	55	(2)
1990–1991	Real Madrid	22	(0)
1991–1994	Osasuna	88	(3)
1994–1995	Atlético Marbella	5	(0)
1995–1996	Radnički Beograd	8	(1)
1996–1997	Radnički Kragujevac		
Total		210+	(8+)

International career
1988–1991	Yugoslavia	31	(1)
- * Club domestic league appearances and goals

Predrag Spasić (Serbian Cyrillic: Предраг Спасић; born 13 May 1965) is a Serbian former footballer who played as a central defender.

== Club career ==
Spasić was born in Kragujevac, PR Serbia, Yugoslavia. Over the course of his career he played for Radnički Kragujevac, Partizan Beograd, Real Madrid, Osasuna, Marbella, Radnički Beograd and again Radnički Kragujevac, retiring at the age of 32.

During his four-year spell in La Liga, Spasić amassed totals of 110 games and three goals, being relegated with Osasuna at the end of the 1993–94 season. On 19 January 1991, whilst at the service of Real Madrid, he scored an own goal in a 1–2 away loss against FC Barcelona, and was widely regarded as one of the club's worst signings.

== International career ==
Spasić was capped 31 times for the Yugoslavia national team and scored one goal, appearing for the quarter-finalists at the 1990 FIFA World Cup (five complete matches). His debut arrived on 24 August 1988, when he played the full 90 minutes in a 2–0 friendly win in Switzerland.
