= Txiki Begiristain =

Spanish footballer (born 1964)

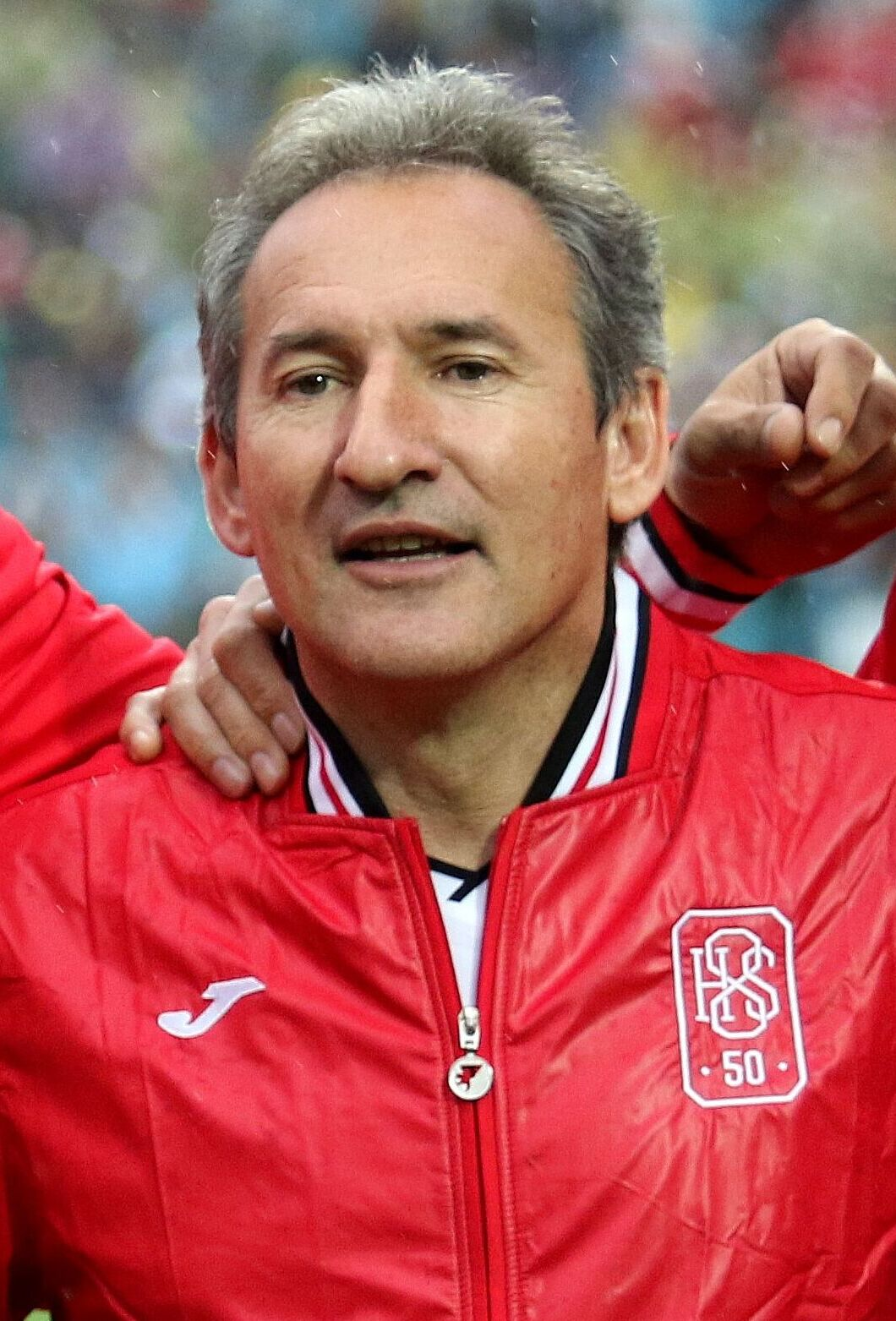
- Begiristain in 2016

Personal information
- Full name: Aitor Begiristain Mujika
- Date of birth: 12 August 1964 (age 62)
- Place of birth: Olaberria, Spain
- Height: 1.71 m (5 ft 7 in)
- Positions: Winger; forward

Youth career
- Segura
- Easo
- 1980–1982: Real Sociedad

Senior career*
Years	Team	Apps	(Gls)
1982	San Sebastián	9	(2)
1982–1988	Real Sociedad	187	(23)
1988–1995	Barcelona	223	(63)
1995–1997	Deportivo La Coruña	43	(4)
1997–1999	Urawa Red Diamonds	61	(16)
Total		523	(108)

International career
1984–1988	Spain U21	19	(4)
1988	Spain U23	1	(0)
1988–1994	Spain	22	(6)
Medal record
Men's football
Representing Spain
UEFA European Under-21 Championship
Winner	1986
- * Club domestic league appearances and goals

Aitor "Txiki" Begiristain Mujika (born 12 August 1964) is a Spanish former professional footballer who played as a left winger or forward.

He was best known for his spells at Real Sociedad and Barcelona, winning eight major titles with the latter, including four La Liga championships and the 1992 European Cup. He represented the Spain national team in one World Cup and one European Championship.

Begiristain worked as a director of football after retiring, spending seven years at Barcelona and 13 at Premier League club Manchester City.

== Club career ==
=== Real Sociedad ===
Born in Olaberria, Gipuzkoa, Basque Country, Begiristain began his professional career with Real Sociedad in 1982 at the age of 18, being immediately cast into the first-team's setup. After 16 La Liga games in his first season, he became an essential member of the side that was coached by John Toshack, also including Luis Arconada, Roberto López Ufarte, José Mari Bakero and Luis López Rekarte; the highlights of his career at Real included scoring the second goal in the 1987 Copa del Rey final against Atlético Madrid, which was eventually won on penalties after the 2–2 draw.

In the 1987–88 campaign, Begiristain helped his team to finish runners-up in both league and cup, with Real Madrid winning the former and Barcelona claiming the latter. Within a month he, along with Bakero and López Rekarte, signed for the Catalan club.

=== Barcelona ===
Begiristain scored in his league debut for Barcelona, a 2–0 home win over Espanyol, and finished his first year at the Camp Nou with 38 games and 12 goals, adding two in nine matches in the victorious campaign in the UEFA Cup Winners' Cup. Alongside fellow Basque players Bakero, Andoni Zubizarreta, Julio Salinas and Jon Andoni Goikoetxea, he was part of the side dubbed Dream Team, winning numerous honours.

During seven seasons at the club, Begiristain played 313 official matches and scored 81 goals, with a career-best 15 in 1992–93 as Barça won the third of four successive league titles. Among his best moments were hat-tricks against Real Valladolid in 1991 and Real Zaragoza two years later.

=== Later years ===
In 1995, after gradually losing his importance with Barcelona (although he still registered 44 games and 13 goals over the last two seasons), Begiristain signed for Deportivo de La Coruña, where he linked up with two past acquaintances, Toshack and López Rekarte. He helped his new team win the Supercopa de España, scoring in the away leg for a 2–1 win against Real Madrid at the Santiago Bernabéu Stadium.

During the last season in Galicia, Begiristain only appeared ten times, but scored against Extremadura in the final round, granting Depor a third-place finish with the 1–0 win. By this time, he had played more than 600 competitive matches in his country and surpassed the 100-goal mark.

Begiristain closed out his career in 1999 at 35, after three years with the Urawa Red Diamonds in the Japanese J1 League.

== International career ==
Begiristain earned 22 caps with six goals for Spain, making his debut in a 2–1 defeat to Czechoslovakia on 24 February 1988 in a friendly held in Málaga. He represented the nation at UEFA Euro 1988 and the 1994 FIFA World Cup, playing his last game in the latter competition, a 3–0 round-of-16 win over Switzerland where he closed the score from a penalty.

== Post-playing career ==
After retiring as a player, Begiristain worked as a commentator for Televisió de Catalunya before becoming director of football at former club Barcelona in 2003. On 28 June 2010 he declared that, with president Joan Laporta leaving, it was the right time for him to part ways with the organisation as well.

Begiristain joined Manchester City of the Premier League on 28 October 2012 in the same capacity. During his tenure, the team won the national championship seven times – and the treble in the 2022–23 season – and several of his compatriots were also brought in as well as former teammate Pep Guardiola as manager.

In October 2024, Begiristain announced he would be departing City the following June after 13 years, being replaced by Sporting CP's Hugo Viana. He officially left on 31 July 2025.

== Career statistics ==
=== Club ===
Appearances and goals by club, season and competition
Club	Season	League			National cup (Note: Includes Copa del Rey, Emperor's Cup)		League cup (Note: Includes Copa de la Liga, J.League Cup)		Continental		Total	
Club	Season	Division	Apps	Goals	Apps	Goals	Apps	Goals	Apps	Goals	Apps	Goals
Real Sociedad	1982–83	La Liga	16	0	2	0	3	0	0	0	21	0
Real Sociedad	1983–84	La Liga	33	3	7	0	4	1	–		44	4
Real Sociedad	1984–85	La Liga	31	5	9	1	2	0	–		42	6
Real Sociedad	1985–86	La Liga	29	1			6	1	–		35	2
Real Sociedad	1986–87	La Liga	42	9					–		42	9
Real Sociedad	1987–88	La Liga	36	5					4	0	40	5
Real Sociedad	Total		187	23	18	1	15	2	4	0	224	26
Barcelona	1988–89	La Liga	38	12	5	0	–		9	2	52	14
Barcelona	1989–90	La Liga	37	10	7	0	–		6	1	50	11
Barcelona	1990–91	La Liga	33	6	7	0	–		8	2	48	8
Barcelona	1991–92	La Liga	34	7	4	0	–		8	2	46	9
Barcelona	1992–93	La Liga	37	15	7	5	–		7	2	51	22
Barcelona	1993–94	La Liga	20	7	4	0	–		10	2	34	9
Barcelona	1994–95	La Liga	24	6	2	2	–		6	0	32	8
Barcelona	Total		223	63	36	7	–		54	11	313	81
Deportivo	1995–96	La Liga	33	2	2	0	–		7	1	42	3
Deportivo	1996–97	La Liga	10	2	3	0	–		0	0	13	2
Deportivo	Total		43	4	5	0	–		7	1	55	5
Urawa Red Diamonds	1997	J1 League	15	4	2	0	2	0	–		19	4
Urawa Red Diamonds	1998	J1 League	30	9	3	0	4	2	–		37	11
Urawa Red Diamonds	1999	J1 League	16	3	0	0	4	1	–		20	4
Urawa Red Diamonds	Total		61	16	5	0	10	3	–		76	19
Career total			514	106	64	8	25	5	65	12	668	131

=== International ===
Appearances and goals by national team and year
National team	Year	Apps	Goals
Spain	1988	6	0
Spain	1989	2	1
Spain	1990	1	0
Spain	1991	1	0
Spain	1992	3	3
Spain	1993	4	1
Spain	1994	5	1
Total		22	6

Scores and results list Spain's goal tally first, score column indicates score after each Begiristain goal.

#	Date	Venue	Opponent	Score	Result	Competition
1.	22 January 1989	Ta' Qali National Stadium, Ta' Qali, Malta	Malta	0–2	0–2	1990 World Cup qualification
2.	11 March 1992	José Zorrilla, Valladolid, Spain	United States	1–0	2–0	Friendly
3.	16 December 1992	Ramón Sánchez Pizjuán, Seville, Spain	Latvia	4–0	5–0	1994 World Cup qualification
4.	16 December 1992	Ramón Sánchez Pizjuán, Seville, Spain	Latvia	5–0	5–0	1994 World Cup qualification
5.	24 February 1993	Benito Villamarín, Seville, Spain	Lithuania	3–0	5–0	1994 World Cup qualification
6.	2 July 1994	Robert F. Kennedy, Washington, D.C., United States	Switzerland	3–0	3–0	1994 FIFA World Cup

== Honours ==
Real Sociedad

- Copa del Rey: 1986–87; runner-up 1987–88
- Supercopa de España: 1982

Barcelona

- La Liga: 1990–91, 1991–92, 1992–93, 1993–94
- Copa del Rey: 1989–90
- Supercopa de España: 1991, 1992, 1994; runner-up 1988, 1990, 1993
- European Cup: 1991–92
- UEFA Cup Winners' Cup: 1988–89
- UEFA Super Cup: 1992

Deportivo La Coruña

- Supercopa de España: 1995

Spain U21

- UEFA European Under-21 Championship: 1986

Individual

- Globe Soccer Best Sporting Director of the Year: 2021
- Premio Nacional "Palabra de Fútbol": 2025

== See also ==
- List of FC Barcelona players (100+ appearances)
- List of La Liga players (400+ appearances)
