= Nando (footballer, born October 1967) =

Spanish footballer

Personal information
- Full name: Fernando Muñoz García
- Date of birth: 30 October 1967 (age 59)
- Place of birth: Seville, Spain
- Height: 1.87 m (6 ft 2 in)
- Position: Centre-back

Youth career
- Sevilla

Senior career*
Years	Team	Apps	(Gls)
1986–1988	Sevilla B	21	(0)
1987–1990	Sevilla	70	(0)
1990–1992	Barcelona	63	(0)
1992–1996	Real Madrid	49	(0)
1996–2001	Espanyol	123	(2)
Total		326	(2)

International career
1985	Spain U18	2	(0)
1989–1990	Spain U21	5	(0)
1990–1992	Spain	8	(0)
- * Club domestic league appearances and goals

Fernando Muñoz García (born 30 October 1967), known as Nando, is a Spanish former professional footballer who played mostly as a central defender (right-footed, he was also utilised on the flank).

He appeared in 305 La Liga games in a 15-year senior career, having represented four clubs, most notably Barcelona and Real Madrid.

== Club career ==
Born in Seville, Nando started his career with hometown club Sevilla FC, his first game being on 22 February 1987 in a 1–0 away win against Athletic Bilbao where he played the full 90 minutes. He left in summer 1990 to join FC Barcelona – with the Andalusians having an option to rebuy – where he won the European Cup in 1992 and two La Liga titles in two seasons; at his new team, he reunited with his former Sevilla teammate Ricardo Serna.

Subsequently, Nando returned to Sevilla, but was immediately bought by Barça archrivals Real Madrid, where he would spend three and a half seasons with irregular playing time – 46 matches over his first two, three following the arrival of Jorge Valdano as manager– before moving to RCD Espanyol in January 1996. At the other Catalonia side, he would play until the end of the 2000–01 campaign, scoring his only goals as a professional in the process; he also conquered the 1999–2000 edition of the Copa del Rey, being sent off in the 2–1 victory over Atlético Madrid.

Nando retired in 2001, aged 33. He later became a businessman.

== International career ==
Nando earned eight caps for the Spain national team, all while at Barcelona. His debut came on 12 September 1990 in a 3–0 friendly win over Brazil, in Gijón.

== Honours ==
Barcelona

- La Liga: 1990–91, 1991–92
- European Cup: 1991–92
- UEFA Cup Winners' Cup runner-up: 1990–91

Real Madrid

- La Liga: 1994–95
- Copa del Rey: 1992–93
- Supercopa de España: 1993

Español

- Copa del Rey: 1999–2000
