= 1991 Supercopa de España =

Spanish football matches

Atlético Madrid	Barcelona
1	2
- on aggregate

First leg
Atlético Madrid	Barcelona
0	1
- Date: 15 October 1991
- Venue: Vicente Calderón, Madrid
- Referee: Merino Gonzalez

Second leg
Barcelona	Atlético Madrid
1	1
- Date: 29 October 1991
- Venue: Camp Nou, Barcelona
- Referee: José Luis Pajares

The 1991 Supercopa de España comprised two-leg Spanish football matches played on 28 October and 11 November, 1991. It was contested by Atlético Madrid, who were Spanish Cup winners in 1990–91, and FC Barcelona, who won the 1990–91 Spanish League. Barcelona won 2–1 on aggregate.

== Match details ==
=== First leg ===
15 October 1991
21:00 CET

Atlético Madrid	0–1	Barcelona
		Amor 86'

Vicente Calderón, Madrid
Attendance: 15,000
Referee: Merino Gonzalez

=== Second leg ===
29 October 1991
20:45 CET

Barcelona	1–1	Atlético Madrid
Bakero 69'		Alfredo 39'

Camp Nou, Barcelona
Attendance: 45,000
Referee: José Luis Pajares

== See also ==
- 1991–92 La Liga
- 1991–92 Copa del Rey
- 1991–92 Atlético Madrid season
- 1991–92 FC Barcelona season
