= 1986–87 FC Barcelona season =

88th season in existence of FC Barcelona

FC Barcelona
1986–87 season
- President: Josep Lluís Núñez
- Manager: Terry Venables
- La Liga: 2nd
- Copa del Rey: Round of 16
- UEFA Cup: Quarter-final
- Top goalscorer: League: Gary Lineker (20); All: Gary Lineker (21)
Home colours	Away colours	Third colours

The 1986–87 season was FC Barcelona's 88th season in existence and the club's 56th consecutive season in the top flight of Spanish football.

== Squad ==
Correct as of 09 March 2019. Note: Flags indicate national team as defined under FIFA eligibility rules; some limited exceptions apply. Players may hold more than one non-FIFA nationality.

No.	Pos.	Nation	Player
—	GK	ESP	Urruti
—	GK	ESP	Andoni Zubizarreta
—	DF	ESP	Migueli
—	DF	ESP	Julio Alberto
—	DF	ESP	Gerardo
—	DF	ESP	Esteban Vigo
—	DF	ESP	Esteve Fradera
—	DF	ESP	Salva
—	DF	ESP	José Ramón Alexanko
—	MF	ESP	Roberto
—	MF	ESP	Josep Moratalla
—	MF	ESP	Ramón Calderé
—	MF	ESP	Urbano

No.	Pos.	Nation	Player
—	MF	ESP	Víctor Muñoz (captain)
—	MF	ESP	Ángel Pedraza
—	MF	ESP	Manolo
—	MF	GER	Bernd Schuster
—	MF	ESP	Nayim
—	FW	ESP	Marcos Alonso
—	FW	ENG	Gary Lineker
—	FW	WAL	Mark Hughes
—	FW	ESP	Lobo Carrasco
—	FW	ESP	Juan Carlos Rojo
—	FW	SCO	Steve Archibald
—	FW	ESP	Paco Clos
—	FW	PAR	Raúl Amarilla

=== Transfers ===
In
Pos.	Name	from	Type
FW	Gary Lineker	Everton FC	
GK	Andoni Zubizarreta	Athletic Bilbao	
FW	Mark Hughes	Manchester United	
MF	Roberto	Valencia CF	
MF	Nayim	FC Barcelona B	

Out
Pos.	Name	To	Type
FW	Pichi Alonso	RCD Español	
MF	Tente Sánchez	Real Murcia	
GK	Amador		

== Competitions ==
=== La Liga ===
==== Regular season table ====
Pos	Team	Pld	W	D	L	GF	GA	GD	Pts	Qualification
1	Real Madrid	34	20	10	4	61	29	+32	50	Qualification for the championship group
2	Barcelona	34	18	13	3	51	22	+29	49	Qualification for the championship group
3	Español	34	17	9	8	52	30	+22	43	Qualification for the championship group
4	Sporting Gijón	34	14	9	11	47	36	+11	37	Qualification for the championship group
5	Mallorca	34	14	8	12	42	46	−4	36	Qualification for the championship group
6	Zaragoza	34	13	10	11	31	30	+1	36	Qualification for the championship group
7	Atlético Madrid	34	13	9	12	37	40	−3	35	Qualification for the intermediate group

Source: BDFútbol
Rules for classification: 1) Points; 2) Head-to-head results; 3) Goal difference; 4) Number of goals scored

==== Results by round ====
Round	1	2	3	4	5	6	7	8	9	10	11	12	13	14	15	16	17	18	19	20	21	22	23	24	25	26	27	28	29	30	31	32	33	34
Ground	H	A	H	A	H	A	A	H	A	H	A	H	A	H	A	H	A	A	H	A	H	A	H	H	A	H	A	H	A	H	A	H	A	H
Result	W	D	W	D	W	D	W	D	W	L	W	D	D	W	W	W	D	D	W	W	W	D	W	D	W	D	W	D	L	L	W	D	W	W
Position	4	4	1	2	2	2	1	1	1	2	1	2	2	1	1	1	1	1	1	1	1	1	1	1	1	1	1	1	1	2	2	2	2	2

Source: BDFutbol
A = Away; H = Home; W = Win; D = Draw; L = Loss; = Leader, 1987–88 European Cup; = 1987–88 UEFA Cup; = 1987–88 Segunda División

==== Matches ====
30 August 1986 1	FC Barcelona	2—0	Racing Santander	Barcelona
				Stadium: Camp Nou

6 September 1986 2	RCD Mallorca	1—1	FC Barcelona	Palma de Mallorca
				Stadium: Lluís Sitjar

10 September 1986 3	FC Barcelona	2—0	Cádiz CF	Barcelona
				Stadium: Camp Nou

13 September 1986 4	CE Sabadell FC	1—1	FC Barcelona	Sabadell
				Stadium: Creu Alta

21 September 1986 5	FC Barcelona	1—0	Sevilla CF	Barcelona
				Stadium: Camp Nou

27 September 1986 6	Athletic Bilbao	2—2	FC Barcelona	Bilbao
				Stadium: San Mames

4 October 1986 7	FC Barcelona	3—0	Real Valladolid	Barcelona
				Stadium: Camp Nou

8 October 1986 8	Real Madrid	1—1	FC Barcelona	Madrid
				Stadium: Santiago Bernabeu

12 October 1986 9	FC Barcelona	1—0	RCD Español	Barcelona
				Stadium: Camp Nou

19 October 1986 10	Real Murcia CF	1—0	FC Barcelona	Murcia
				Stadium: La Condomina

26 October 1986 11	FC Barcelona	4—0	UD Las Palmas	Barcelona
				Stadium: Camp Nou

2 November 1986 12	Sporting de Gijón	0—0	FC Barcelona	Gijón
				Stadium: El Molinon

8 November 1986 13	FC Barcelona	0—0	Real Zaragoza	Barcelona
				Stadium: Camp Nou

16 November 1986 14	Real Betis	0—1	FC Barcelona	Sevilla
				Stadium: Benito Villamarin

22 November 1986 15	FC Barcelona	1—0	Real Sociedad	Barcelona
				Stadium: Camp Nou

6 December 1986 16	Osasuna	0—2	FC Barcelona	Pamplona
				Stadium: El Sadar

14 December 1986 17	FC Barcelona	1—1	Atletico Madrid	Barcelona
				Stadium: Camp Nou

17 December 1986 18	Racing Santander	0—0	FC Barcelona	Santander
				Stadium: El Sardinero

21 December 1986 19	FC Barcelona	3—1	RCD Mallorca	Barcelona
				Stadium: Camp Nou

28 December 1986 20	Cádiz CF	0—1	FC Barcelona	Cádiz
				Stadium: Ramon de Carranza

4 January 1987 21	FC Barcelona	3—1	CE Sabadell FC	Barcelona
				Stadium: Camp Nou

11 January 1987 22	Sevilla CF	0—0	FC Barcelona	Sevilla
				Stadium: Sanchez Pizjuan

17 January 1987 23	FC Barcelona	4—1	Athletic Bilbao	Barcelona
				Stadium: Camp Nou

25 January 1987 24	Real Valladolid	0—0	FC Barcelona	Valladolid
				Stadium: Jose Zorrilla

31 January 1987 25	FC Barcelona	3—2	Real Madrid	Barcelona
				Stadium: Camp Nou

8 February 1987 26	RCD Español	0—0	FC Barcelona	Barcelona
				Stadium: Sarria

15 February 1987 27	FC Barcelona	2—0	Real Murcia CF	Barcelona
				Stadium: Camp Nou

22 February 1987 28	UD Las Palmas	0—0	FC Barcelona	Las Palmas
				Stadium: Insular

28 February 1987 29	FC Barcelona	0—4	Sporting de Gijón	Barcelona
				Stadium: Camp Nou

8 March 1987 30	Real Zaragoza	2—0	FC Barcelona	Zaragoza
				Stadium: La Romareda

14 March 1987 31	FC Barcelona	2—0	Real Betis	Barcelona
				Stadium: Camp Nou

22 March 1987 32	Real Sociedad	1—1	FC Barcelona	San Sebastián
				Stadium: Anoeta

25 March 1987 33	FC Barcelona	4—2	Osasuna	Barcelona
				Stadium: Camp Nou

5 April 1987 34	Atletico Madrid	0—4	FC Barcelona	Madrid
				Stadium: Vicente Calderon

==== Championship group table ====
Pos	Team	Pld	W	D	L	GF	GA	GD	Pts	Qualification or relegation
1	Real Madrid	44	27	12	5	84	37	+47	66	Qualification for the European Cup first round
2	Barcelona	44	24	15	5	63	29	+34	63	Qualification for the UEFA Cup first round
3	Español	44	20	11	13	66	46	+20	51	Qualification for the UEFA Cup first round
4	Sporting Gijón	44	16	13	15	58	50	+8	45	Qualification for the UEFA Cup first round
5	Zaragoza	44	15	14	15	46	47	−1	44	
6	Mallorca	44	15	12	17	48	65	−17	42	

Source: BDFútbol
Rules for classification: 1) Points; 2) Head-to-head results; 3) Goal difference; 4) Number of goals scored

==== Matches ====
12 April 1987 1	Real Madrid	0–0	FC Barcelona	Madrid
				Stadium: Santiago Bernabeu

19 April 1987 2	FC Barcelona	1–0	RCD Mallorca	Barcelona
				Stadium: Camp Nou

3 May 1987 3	RCD Español	0–0	FC Barcelona	Barcelona
				Stadium: Sarria

9 May 1987 4	FC Barcelona	2–0	Sporting de Gijón	Barcelona
				Stadium: Camp Nou

17 May 1987 5	Real Zaragoza	2–1	FC Barcelona	Zaragoza
				Stadium: La Romareda

23 May 1987 6	FC Barcelona	2–1	Real Madrid	Barcelona
				Stadium: Camp Nou

31 May 1987 7	RCD Mallorca	0–1	FC Barcelona	Palma

7 June 1987 8	FC Barcelona	2-1	RCD Español	Barcelona
				Stadium: Camp Nou

14 June 1987 9	Sporting de Gijón	1-0	FC Barcelona	Gijón
				Stadium: El Molinon

21 June 1987 10	FC Barcelona	3-2	Real Zaragoza	Barcelona
				Stadium: Camp Nou

=== UEFA Cup ===
==== First round ====
1986-09-17 UEFA Cup	Flamurtari Vlorë (Albania)	1-1	(Spain) FC Barcelona

1986-10-01 UEFA Cup	FC Barcelona (Spain)	0-0	(Albania) Flamurtari Vlorë

==== Second round ====
1986-10-22 UEFA Cup	FC Barcelona (Spain)	1-0	Sporting Clube de Portugal

1986-11-05 UEFA Cup	Sporting Clube de Portugal	2-1	(Spain) FC Barcelona

==== Eightfinals ====
1986-11-26 UEFA Cup	Bayer Uerdingen (West Germany)	0-2	(Spain) FC Barcelona

1986-12-10 UEFA Cup	FC Barcelona (Spain)	2-0	(West Germany) Bayer Uerdingen

==== Quarterfinals ====
1987-03-04 UEFA Cup	Dundee United (Scotland)	1-0	(Spain) FC Barcelona

1987-03-18 UEFA Cup	FC Barcelona (Spain)	1-2	(Scotland) Dundee United

=== Copa del Rey ===
==== Eightfinals ====
1987-01-28 COPA DEL REY	BARCELONA	0-1	OSASUNA

1987-02-11 COPA DEL REY	OSASUNA	0-1 (5-3 p)	BARCELONA

== Friendlies and Pre-season ==
1987-04-07 FRIENDLY	BARCELONA	3-0	KOPARIT

1987-04-16 FRIENDLY	BARCELONA	1-2	SABADELL

1987-05-06 FRIENDLY	BARCELONA	3-1	FIGUERES

1987-06-17 FRIENDLY	BARCELONA	4-0	TARREGA

8 August 1986 FRIENDLY	ANDORRA	2-4	FC Barcelona

7 August 1986 Trofeo Ciudad de Palma	FC Barcelona	2-1	Cruzeiro

9 August 1986 Trofeo Ciudad de Palma	FC Barcelona	2-1	RCD Mallorca

15 August 1986 Trofeo Colombino	FC Barcelona	1-1 (3-4 p)	Manchester City

16 August 1986 Trofeo Colombino	FC Barcelona	4-1	Sevilla CF

19 August 1986 Joan Gamper Trophy	FC Barcelona	3-1	A.C. Milan

20 August 1986 Joan Gamper Trophy	FC Barcelona	1-0	P.S.V. Eindhoven

1986-08-23 Festa d'Elx Trophy	FC Barcelona	1-2	ELCHE

1986-08-25 FRIENDLY	FC Barcelona	3-1	FIGUERAS

1986-09-23 FRIENDLY	FC Barcelona	7-1	GIMNASTIC

=== Mundialito ===
1987-06-23 Mundialito de Clubs	BARCELONA	1-3	INTER MILAN

1987-06-25 Mundialito de Clubs	BARCELONA	3-1	PSG

1987-06-27 Mundialito de Clubs	BARCELONA	1-1	PORTO

1987-06-30 Mundialito de Clubs	BARCELONA	0-1	MILAN

== Statistics ==
=== Players statistics ===
No.	Pos	Nat	Player	Total		La Liga		UEFA Cup		Copa del Rey	
No.	Pos	Nat	Player	Apps	Goals	Apps	Goals	Apps	Goals	Apps	Goals
	GK	(Spain) ESP	Zubizarreta	54	-29	44	-22	2	-1	8	-6
	DF	(Spain) ESP	Gerardo	51	1	41	1	8	0	2	0
	DF	(Spain) ESP	Migueli	49	0	41	0	8	0	0	0
	DF	(Spain) ESP	Julio Alberto	35	1	29+1	0	5	1	0	0
	MF	(Spain) ESP	Víctor Muñoz	50	4	41	4	6+1	0	2	0
	MF	(Spain) ESP	Ramón Calderé	38	5	23+10	4	3+2	1	0	0
	MF	(Spain) ESP	Roberto	48	14	40	10	7	4	1	0
	MF	(Spain) ESP	Moratalla	50	0	40	0	8	0	2	0
	FW	(Spain) ESP	Lobo Carrasco	36	6	29+2	6	3	0	2	0
	FW	(Wales) WAL	Mark Hughes	37	5	28	4	7	1	2	0
	FW	(England) ENG	Gary Lineker	50	21	41	20	8	0	1	1
	GK	(Spain) ESP	Urruti	1	0	0+1	0	0	0	0	0
	MF	(Spain) ESP	Marcos Alonso	34	1	16+10	1	6	0	1+1	0
	DF	(Spain) ESP	Manolo	21	0	15	0	3+1	0	2	0
	MF	(Spain) ESP	Urbano Ortega	34	1	13+15	1	2+2	0	1+1	0
	MF	(Spain) ESP	Angel Pedraza	27	2	13+9	2	3+1	0	1	0
	FW	(Scotland) SCO	Steve Archibald	10	5	10	5	0	0	0	0
	MF	(Spain) ESP	Esteban Vigo	19	2	9+4	1	1+3	1	1+1	0
	DF	(Spain) ESP	Esteve Fradera	14	0	7+4	0	0+1	0	2	0
	FW	(Paraguay) PAR	Vicente Amarilla	6	1	2+3	1	1	0	0	0
	FW	(Spain) ESP	Paco Clos	5	0	1+4	0	0	0	0	0
	MF	(Spain) ESP	Nayim	3	0	1+2	0	0	0	0	0
	FW	(Spain) ESP	Juan Carlos Rojo	10	0	0+7	0	0+3	0	0	0
	DF	(Spain) ESP	Salva	2	0	0+2	0	0	0	0	0
	DF	(Spain) ESP	Alexanko	0	0	0	0	0	0	0	0
	MF	(Germany) GER	Schuster	0	0	0	0				

- Source: http://www.bdfutbol.com/en/t/t1993-941.html
