= 1985–86 FC Barcelona season =

87th season in existence of FC Barcelona

FC Barcelona
1985–86 season
- President: Josep Lluís Núñez
- Manager: Terry Venables
- La Liga: 2nd
- Copa del Rey: Runners-up
- Copa de la Liga: Winners
- Supercopa de España: Runners-up
- European Cup: Runners-up
- Top goalscorer: League: Bernd Schuster (10); All: Bernd Schuster (12)

The 1985–86 season was the 87th season for FC Barcelona.

== Squad ==
Note: Flags indicate national team as defined under FIFA eligibility rules; some limited exceptions apply. Players may hold more than one non-FIFA nationality.

No.	Pos.	Nation	Player
—	GK	ESP	Urruti
—	GK	ESP	Amador
—	DF	ESP	Migueli
—	DF	ESP	Julio Alberto
—	DF	ESP	Gerardo
—	DF	ESP	Esteban Vigo
—	DF	ESP	Salva
—	DF	ESP	José Ramón Alexanko (captain)
—	MF	ESP	Víctor
—	MF	ESP	Roberto
—	MF	ESP	Josep Moratalla
—	MF	ESP	Ramón Calderé
—	MF	ESP	Urbano

No.	Pos.	Nation	Player
—	MF	ESP	Ángel Pedraza
—	MF	ESP	Manolo
—	MF	GER	Bernd Schuster (captain)
—	MF	ESP	Tente Sánchez
—	FW	ESP	Marcos Alonso
—	FW	ESP	Pichi Alonso
—	FW	ESP	Lobo Carrasco
—	FW	ESP	Juan Carlos Rojo
—	FW	SCO	Steve Archibald
—	FW	ESP	Paco Clos
—	FW	ESP	Raúl Amarilla

=== La Liga ===
==== League table ====
Pos	Team	Pld	W	D	L	GF	GA	GD	Pts	Qualification or relegation
1	Real Madrid (C)	34	26	4	4	83	33	+50	56	Qualification for the European Cup first round
2	Barcelona	34	18	9	7	61	36	+25	45	Qualification for the UEFA Cup first round
3	Athletic Bilbao	34	17	9	8	44	31	+13	43	Qualification for the UEFA Cup first round
4	Zaragoza	34	15	12	7	51	34	+17	42	Qualification for the Cup Winners' Cup first round (Note: Zaragoza qualified for the European Cup Winners' Cup as champions of the Copa del Rey.)
5	Atlético Madrid	34	17	8	9	53	38	+15	42	Qualification for the UEFA Cup first round

Source: BDFútbol
Rules for classification: 1) Points; 2) Head-to-head results; 3) Goal difference; 4) Number of goals scored
(C) Champions

==== Position by round ====
Round	1	2	3	4	5	6	7	8	9	10	11	12	13	14	15	16	17	18	19	20	21	22	23	24	25	26	27	28	29	30	31	32	33	34
Ground	A	H	A	H	A	H	A	H	A	H	A	H	A	H	A	H	A	H	A	H	A	H	A	H	A	H	A	H	A	H	A	H	A	H
Result	D	W	L	D	L	D	W	W	D	W	W	W	W	W	L	W	D	W	W	W	W	W	D	W	L	W	W	L	D	D	L	D	W	L
Position	11	4	9	8	13	11	7	5	5	5	4	3	2	2	3	2	2	2	2	2	2	2	2	2	2	2	2	2	2	2	2	2	2	2

Source: BDFutbol
A = Away; H = Home; W = Win; D = Draw; L = Loss; = Leader, 1986–87 European Cup; = 1986–87 UEFA Cup; = 1986–87 Segunda División

==== Matches ====
1 September 1985 1	Racing Santander	0-0	FC Barcelona	Santander
				Stadium: El Sardinero

4 September 1985 2	FC Barcelona	2-0	Real Zaragoza	Barcelona
				Stadium: Camp Nou

8 September 1985 3	Atletico Madrid	2-1	FC Barcelona	Madrid
				Stadium: Vicente Calderon

14 September 1985 4	FC Barcelona	2-2	Osasuna	Barcelona
				Stadium: Camp Nou

28 September 1985 5	Athletic Bilbao	2-1	FC Barcelona	Bilbao
				Stadium: San Mames

6 October 1985 6	FC Barcelona	0-0	Sevilla CF	Barcelona
				Stadium: Camp Nou

13 October 1985 7	Hercules CF	1-2	FC Barcelona	Alicante
				Stadium: Rico Perez

27 October 1985 8	FC Barcelona	1-0	Cadiz CF	Barcelona
				Stadium: Camp Nou

3 November 1985 9	Real Valladolid	2-2	FC Barcelona	Valladolid
				Stadium: Jose Zorrilla

9 November 1985 10	FC Barcelona	2-0	Real Madrid	Barcelona
				Stadium: Camp Nou

17 November 1985 11	Celta Vigo	0-2	FC Barcelona	Vigo
				Stadium: Balaidos

23 November 1985 12	FC Barcelona	2-0	Sporting Gijon	Barcelona
				Stadium: Camp Nou

27 November 1985 13	FC Barcelona	3-1	UD Las Palmas	Barcelona
				Stadium: Camp Nou

1 December 1985 14	Real Sociedad	1-5	FC Barcelona	San Sebastian
				Stadium: Atotxa

8 December 1985 15	FC Barcelona	1-2	Real Betis	Barcelona
				Stadium: Camp Nou

15 December 1985 16	Valencia CF	1-2	FC Barcelona

22 December 1985 17	FC Barcelona	0-0	Español	Barcelona
				Stadium: Camp Nou

29 December 1985 18	FC Barcelona	2-0	Racing Santander	Barcelona
				Stadium: Camp Nou

5 January 1986 19	Real Zaragoza	1-3	FC Barcelona

11 January 1986 20	FC Barcelona	2-1	Atletico Madrid	Barcelona
				Stadium: Camp Nou

19 January 1986 21	Osasuna	0-1	FC Barcelona

26 January 1986 22	FC Barcelona	3-1	Athletic Bilbao	Barcelona
				Stadium: Camp Nou

2 February 1986 23	Sevilla CF	0-0	FC Barcelona

8 February 1986 24	FC Barcelona	3-1	Hercules CF	Barcelona
				Stadium: Camp Nou

16 February 1986 25	UD Las Palmas	3-0	FC Barcelona

23 February 1986 26	Cadiz CF	1-3	FC Barcelona

1 March 1986 27	FC Barcelona	4-0	Real Valladolid	Barcelona
				Stadium: Camp Nou

8 March 1986 28	Real Madrid	3-1	FC Barcelona

15 March 1986 29	FC Barcelona	1-1	Celta Vigo	Barcelona
				Stadium: Camp Nou

23 March 1986 30	Sporting Gijon	1-1	FC Barcelona

29 March 1986 31	FC Barcelona	2-3	Real Sociedad	Barcelona
				Stadium: Camp Nou

6 April 1986 32	Real Betis	1-1	FC Barcelona

12 April 1986 33	FC Barcelona	3-0	Valencia CF	Barcelona
				Stadium: Camp Nou

20 April 1986 34	Español	5-3	FC Barcelona

=== Supercopa ===
9 October 1985	Atletico Madrid	3–1	FC Barcelona

=== Copa del Rey ===
==== Quarterfinals ====
12 February 1986	Atletico Madrid	1–2	FC Barcelona

26 February 1986	FC Barcelona	0–0	Atletico Madrid

==== Semifinals ====
12 March 1986	FC Barcelona	1–0	Athletic Bilbao

9 April 1986	Athletic Bilbao	1–2	FC Barcelona

=== European Cup ===
==== Second round ====
18 September 1985	AC Sparta Praha (Czechoslovakia)	1–2	(Spain) FC Barcelona

2 October 1985	FC Barcelona (Spain)	0–1 (2–2a agg.)	(Czechoslovakia) AC Sparta Praha

==== Eightfinals ====
23 October 1985	FC Barcelona (Spain)	2–0	(Portugal) FC Porto

6 November 1985	FC Porto (Portugal)	3–1 (3–3a agg.)	(Spain) FC Barcelona

==== Quarterfinals ====
5 March 1986	FC Barcelona (Spain)	1–0	(Italy) Juventus

19 March 1986	Juventus (Italy)	1–1 (1–2 agg.)	(Spain) FC Barcelona

==== Semifinals ====
2 April 1986	IFK Göteborg (Sweden)	3–0	(Spain) FC Barcelona

16 April 1986	FC Barcelona (Spain)	3–0 (a.e.t.) (3–3 agg.) (5–4 p)	(Sweden) IFK Göteborg

==== Final ====
7 May 1986	FC Barcelona (Spain)	0–0 (a.e.t.) (0–2 p)	(Romania) FC Steaua București

=== Copa de la Liga ===
==== Eightfinals ====
11 May 1986 COPA DE LA LIGA	FC Barcelona	2–2	Real Madrid

18 May 1986 COPA DE LA LIGA	Real Madrid	0–4	FC Barcelona

==== Quarterfinals ====
24 May 1986 COPA DE LA LIGA	FC Barcelona	1–0	Sporting Gijon

29 May 1986 COPA DE LA LIGA	Sporting Gijon	2–2	FC Barcelona

==== Semifinals ====
4 June 1986 COPA DE LA LIGA	Atletico Madrid	0–1	FC Barcelona

8 June 1986 COPA DE LA LIGA	FC Barcelona	1–1	Atletico Madrid

==== Final ====
11 June 1986 COPA DE LA LIGA	Real Betis	1–0	FC Barcelona

14 June 1986	FC Barcelona	2–0	Real Betis

=== Friendlies ===
4 August 1985	Andorra	2–5	FC Barcelona

8 August 1985 City of Palma Trophy	RCD Mallorca	0–1	FC Barcelona

10 August 1985 City of Palma Trophy	Gremio	1–0	FC Barcelona

14 August 1985 City of La Linea Trophy	Boavista FC-	1–3	FC Barcelona

16 August 1985 City of La Linea Trophy	Atletico Mineiro	1–3	FC Barcelona

20 August 1985 Joan Gamper Trophy	FC Barcelona	3–0	Rapid Wien

21 August 1985 Joan Gamper Trophy	FC Barcelona	3–1	Hamburger SV

25 August 1985 City of Zaragoza Trophy	Real Zaragoza	0–2	FC Barcelona
