= 1984–85 FC Barcelona season =

86th season in existence of FC Barcelona

FC Barcelona
1984–85 season
- President: Josep Lluís Núñez
- Manager: Terry Venables
- La Liga: 1st
- Copa del Rey: Quarter-finals
- Copa de la Liga: Quarter-finals
- Cup Winners' Cup: First round
- Top goalscorer: League: Steve Archibald (15); All: Steve Archibald (15)
- Biggest win: Barcelona 6–0 Lleida (27 Nov '84, Copa del Rey); Barcelona 6–0 Real Murcia (10 Feb '85, La Liga)
- Biggest defeat: Barcelona 1–4 Metz (3 Oct '84, Club Winners' Cup)
Home colours	Away colours

The 1984–85 season was the 86th season for FC Barcelona.

== Squad ==
Note: Flags indicate national team as defined under FIFA eligibility rules; some limited exceptions apply. Players may hold more than one non-FIFA nationality.

No.	Pos.	Nation	Player
—	GK	ESP	Urruti
—	GK	ESP	Amador
—	GK	ESP	Abellán
—	DF	ESP	Migueli
—	DF	ESP	Julio Alberto
—	DF	ESP	Gerardo
—	DF	ESP	Esteban Vigo
—	DF	ESP	Juan Carlos Carreras
—	DF	ESP	José Miguel Aranda
—	DF	ESP	Salva
—	DF	ESP	José Ramón Alexanko
—	DF	ESP	Josep Moratalla
—	DF	ESP	Manolo
—	DF	ESP	Antonio Padilla
—	DF	ESP	Alejandro Bueno
—	MF	ESP	Víctor
—	MF	ESP	Martín Domínguez
—	MF	ESP	Ramón Calderé

No.	Pos.	Nation	Player
—	MF	SUI	Miguel Retuerto
—	MF	ESP	Urbano
—	MF	ESP	Cristóbal Sánchez
—	MF	ESP	Jordi Durán
—	MF	GER	Bernd Schuster
—	MF	ESP	Tente
—	MF	ESP	Luis Milla
—	MF	ESP	Periko Alonso
—	FW	ESP	Marcos Alonso
—	FW	ESP	Pichi Alonso
—	FW	ESP	Francisco López López
—	FW	ESP	Lobo Carrasco
—	FW	ESP	Juan Carlos Rojo
—	FW	SCO	Steve Archibald
—	FW	ESP	Paco Clos
—	FW	ESP	Manuel Lobo

== Competitions ==
=== La Liga ===
==== League table ====
Pos	Team	Pld	W	D	L	GF	GA	GD	Pts	Qualification or relegation
1	Barcelona (C)	34	21	11	2	69	25	+44	53	Qualification for the European Cup first round
2	Atlético Madrid	34	16	11	7	51	28	+23	43	Qualification for the Cup Winners' Cup first round (Note: Atlético Madrid qualified for the European Cup Winners' Cup as winners of the Copa del Rey.)
3	Athletic Bilbao	34	13	15	6	39	26	+13	41	Qualification for the UEFA Cup first round
4	Sporting Gijón	34	13	15	6	34	23	+11	41	Qualification for the UEFA Cup first round
5	Real Madrid	34	13	10	11	46	36	+10	36	Qualification for the UEFA Cup first round

Source: BDFútbol
Rules for classification: 1) Points; 2) Head-to-head results; 3) Goal difference; 4) Number of goals scored
(C) Champions

==== Results summary ====
Overall								Home						Away					
Pld	W	D	L	GF	GA	GD	Pts	W	D	L	GF	GA	GD	W	D	L	GF	GA	GD
34	21	11	2	69	25	+44	53	13	4	0	42	9	+33	8	7	2	27	16	+11

Source: BD Fútbol

==== Result round by round ====
Round	1	2	3	4	5	6	7	8	9	10	11	12	13	14	15	16	17	18	19	20	21	22	23	24	25	26	27	28	29	30	31	32	33	34
Ground	A	H	A	H	A	H	A	H	A	H	A	H	H	A	H	A	H	H	A	H	A	H	A	H	A	H	A	H	A	A	H	A	H	A
Result	W	W	D	W	W	W	D	D	W	D	W	W	W	D	W	L	W	W	W	W	D	W	W	W	D	D	W	W	L	W	W	D	D	D
Position	1	1	1	1	1	1	1	1	1	1	1	1	1	1	1	1	1	1	1	1	1	1	1	1	1	1	1	1	1	1	1	1	1	1

Source: BD Fútbol
A = Away; H = Home; W = Win; D = Draw; L = Loss

==== Matches ====
2 September 1984 1	Real Madrid	0–3	Barcelona	Madrid
		Report	Ángel 46' (o.g.); Archibald 86'; Calderé 89'	Stadium: Santiago Bernabéu; Referee: Ildelfonso Urízar Azpitarte

9 September 1984 2	Barcelona	4–0	Real Zaragoza	Barcelona
	Milla 19'; Lobo 24' (pen.); Bueno 59'; Domínguez 70'	Report		Stadium: Camp Nou; Referee: José Merino González
Note: The match was played with youth and amateur players due to an ongoing strike caused by professional players.

23 September 1984 4	Barcelona	1–0	Espanyol	Barcelona
	Víctor 10'	Report		Stadium: Camp Nou; Referee: Ángel Franco Martínez

29 September 1984 5	Real Betis	1–2	Barcelona	Seville
	Parra 2'	Report	Schuster 14'; Alexanko 37'	Stadium: Benito Villamarín; Referee: Raúl García de Loza

7 October 1984 6	Barcelona	2–0	Osasuna	Barcelona
	Schuster 44'; Carrasco 68'	Report		Stadium: Camp Nou; Referee: Manuel Álvarez Margüenda

12 October 1984 7	Real Murcia	1–1	Barcelona	Murcia
	Figueroa 82'	Report	Marcos 47'	Stadium: La Condomina; Referee: José Donato Pes Pérez

21 October 1984 8	Barcelona	1–1	Real Sociedad	Barcelona
	Schuster 71'	Report	López Ufarte 45'	Stadium: Camp Nou; Referee: Teodoro Valdés Sánchez

28 October 1984 9	Atlético Madrid	1–2	Barcelona	Madrid
	Sánchez 61' (pen.)	Report	Calderé 8'; Migueli 84'	Stadium: Vicente Calderón; Referee: Joaquín Urío Velázquez

1 November 1984 3(*)	Elche	0–0	Barcelona	Elche
		Report		Stadium: Nuevo Estadio; Referee: Augusto Lamo Castillo
Note: The match was originally scheduled for 16 September 1984, but was postponed due to a strike caused by professional players.

4 November 1984 10	Barcelona	1–1	Valencia	Barcelona
	Archibald 35'	Report	Saura 20'	Stadium: Camp Nou; Referee: Emilio Soriano Aladrén

18 November 1984 11	Málaga	1–2	Barcelona	Málaga
	Brescia 54'	Report	Schuster 27'; Archibald 37'	Stadium: La Rosaleda; Referee: Ildelfonso Urízar Azpitarte

21 November 1984 12	Barcelona	2–0	Hércules	Barcelona
	Migueli 19'; Julio Alberto 74'	Report		Stadium: Camp Nou; Referee: Francisco Ceballos Borrego

25 November 1984 13	Barcelona	4–2	Real Valladolid	Barcelona
	Archibald 34', 62'; Alexanko 45'; Carrasco 57'	Report	Gail 12'; Fonseca 86'	Stadium: Camp Nou; Referee: José Donato Pes Pérez

2 December 1984 14	Sporting de Gijón	2–2	Barcelona	Gijón
	Ferrero 40'; Quini 41'	Report	Cundi 5' (o.g.); Archibald 26'	Stadium: El Molinón; Referee: Teodoro Valdés Sánchez

8 December 1984 15	Barcelona	3–1	Sevilla	Barcelona
	Carrasco 34'; Archibald 65'; Schuster 88'	Report	Ruda 58'	Stadium: Camp Nou; Referee: Victoriano Sánchez Arminio

16 December 1984 16	Athletic Bilbao	1–0	Barcelona	Bilbao
	Salinas 72'	Report		Stadium: San Mamés; Referee: Ángel Franco Martínez

23 December 1984 17	Barcelona	2–0	Racing de Santander	Barcelona
	Víctor 7'; Schuster 89' (pen.)	Report		Stadium: Camp Nou; Referee: Juan Andújar Oliver

30 December 1984 18	Barcelona	3–2	Real Madrid	Barcelona
	Gerardo 25'; Migueli 53'; Vigo 79'	Report	Sanchís 30'; Butragueño 89'	Stadium: Camp Nou; Referee: Joaquín Ramos Marcos

6 January 1985 19	Real Zaragoza	2–4	Barcelona	Zaragoza
	Šurjak 8', 84'	Report	Clos 10'; Vigo 12'; Archibald 22', 86'	Stadium: La Romareda; Referee: José Socorro González

13 January 1985 20	Barcelona	4–0	Elche	Barcelona
	Schuster 14'; Gerardo 29'; Archibald 56'; Marcos 89'	Report		Stadium: Camp Nou; Referee: Anastasio Mayoral Cedenilla

20 January 1985 21	Espanyol	0–0	Barcelona	Barcelona
		Report		Stadium: Sarrià Stadium; Referee: José Merino González

27 January 1985 22	Barcelona	4–0	Real Betis	Barcelona
	Clos 35'; Archibald 52', 79'; Calderé 66'	Report		Stadium: Camp Nou; Referee: Raúl García de Loza

3 February 1985 23	Osasuna	1–2	Barcelona	Pamplona
	Orejuela 80'	Report	Gerardo 32'; Vigo 39'	Stadium: El Sadar; Referee: José Donato Pes Pérez

10 February 1985 24	Barcelona	6–0	Real Murcia	Barcelona
	Schuster 3', 63' (pen.); Archibald 29'; Marcos 36'; Vigo 43'; Clos 86'	Report		Stadium: Camp Nou; Referee: Antonio Borrás del Barrio

17 February 1985 25	Real Sociedad	0–0	Barcelona	San Sebastián
		Report		Stadium: Atotxa Stadium; Referee: Teodoro Valdés Sánchez

20 February 1985 26	Barcelona	2–2	Atlético Madrid	Barcelona
	Migueli 23'; Archibald 88'	Report	Sánchez 62'; Cabrera 63'	Stadium: Camp Nou; Referee: Joaquín Ramos Marcos

3 March 1985 27	Valencia	2–5	Barcelona	Valencia
	Robert 12'; Tendillo 58' (pen.)	Report	Archibald 15'; Schuster 18'; Clos 22'; Rojo 37'; Marcos 68'	Stadium: Luis Casanova; Referee: Emilio Soriano Aladrén

10 March 1985 28	Barcelona	1–0	Málaga	Barcelona
	Muñoz Pérez 42' (o.g.)	Report		Stadium: Camp Nou; Referee: Ángel Franco Martínez

17 March 1985 29	Hércules	1–0	Barcelona	Alicante
	Cartagena 87' (pen.)	Report		Stadium: José Rico Pérez; Referee: Ildelfonso Urízar Azpitarte

24 March 1985 30	Real Valladolid	1–2	Barcelona	Valladolid
	González 14'	Report	Clos 9'; Alexanko 65'	Stadium: Municipal de Zorrilla; Referee: Victoriano Sánchez Arminio

30 March 1985 31	Barcelona	2–0	Sporting de Gijón	Barcelona
	Rojo 15'; Clos 27'	Report		Stadium: Camp Nou; Referee: Jaime Bayarri Ribelles

7 April 1985 32	Sevilla	2–2	Barcelona	Seville
	Magdaleno 55', 63' (pen.)	Report	Carrasco 38'; Schuster 76' (pen.)	Stadium: Ramón Sánchez Pizjuán; Referee: Augusto Lamo Castillo

14 April 1985 33	Barcelona	0–0	Athletic Bilbao	Barcelona
		Report		Stadium: Camp Nou; Referee: Fermín Sánchez-Molina Soto

21 April 1985 34	Racing de Santander	0–0	Barcelona	Santander
		Report		Stadium: El Sardinero; Referee: José Mauro Socorro González

=== Copa de la Liga ===
==== Second round ====
4 May 1985 1st Leg	Barcelona	2–0	Real Sociedad	Barcelona
	Marcos 22'; Calderé 43'	Report		Stadium: Camp Nou

7 May 1985 2nd Leg	Real Sociedad	2–2 (2–4 agg.)	Barcelona	San Sebastián
	López Ufarte 41'; Uralde 49' (pen.)	Report	Marcos 15'; Archibald 88'	Stadium: Atotxa Stadium

==== Quarterfinals ====
11 May 1985 1st Leg	Barcelona	2–2	Real Madrid	Barcelona
	Clos 40'; Marcos 44'	Report	Valdano 67'; Juanito 75'	Stadium: Camp Nou

16 May 1985 2nd Leg	Real Madrid	1–1 (3–3 agg.) (4–1 p)	Barcelona	Madrid
	Valdano 83'	Report	Moratalla 57'	Stadium: Santiago Bernabéu
	Penalties
	Valdano (penalty scored); San José (penalty scored); Butragueño (penalty scored); Juanito (penalty scored)		(penalty missed) Carrasco; (penalty missed) Gerardo; (penalty scored) Marcos

=== European Cup Winners' Cup ===
==== First round ====
19 September 1984 1st Leg	Metz (France)	2–4	(Spain) Barcelona	Metz, France
	Kurbos 44'; Rohr 87' (pen.)	Report	Sonor 12' (o.g.); Schuster 47'; Calderé 53'; Carrasco 64'	Stadium: Stade Saint-Symphorien; Attendance: 17,403; Referee: Jan Keizer (Netherlands)

3 October 1984 2nd Leg	Barcelona (Spain)	1–4 (5–6 agg.)	(France) Metz	Barcelona, Spain
	Carrasco 33'	Report	Kurbos 38', 65', 85'; Sánchez 39' (o.g.)	Stadium: Camp Nou; Attendance: 24,680; Referee: Ron Bridges (Wales)

=== Copa del Rey ===
==== Second round ====
7 November 1984 1st Leg	Lleida	3–1	Barcelona	Lleida
	Azcona 5'; Serna 50', 90'	Report	Esteban 57'	Stadium: Camp d'Esports; Attendance: 15,000; Referee: Antonio Borrás del Barrio

27 November 1984 2nd Leg	Barcelona	6–0 (7–3 agg.)	Lleida	Barcelona
	Carrasco 11', 40'; Archibald 22'; Schuster 42' (pen.), 83'; Esteban 47'	Report		Stadium: Camp Nou; Attendance: 50,000; Referee: Anastasio Mayoral Cedenilla

==== Third round ====
12 December 1984 1st Leg	Barcelona	4–1	Real Murcia	Barcelona
	Schuster 18', 78'; Archibald 57'; Pichi Alonso 87'	Report	Figueroa 30'	Stadium: Camp Nou; Attendance: 50,000; Referee: Miguel Ángel Marín López

9 January 1985 2nd Leg	Real Murcia	0–1 (1–5 agg.)	Barcelona	Murcia
		Report	Schuster 71' (pen.)	Stadium: La Condomina; Attendance: 20,000; Referee: Antonio Martín Navarrete

==== Fourth round ====
30 January 1985 1st Leg	Espanyol	0–2	Barcelona	Barcelona
		Report	Calderé 65'; Clos 89'	Stadium: Sarrià Stadium; Attendance: 20,000; Referee: Fermín Sánchez-Molina Soto

6 February 1985 2nd Leg	Barcelona	3–0 (5–0 agg.)	Espanyol	Barcelona
	Schuster 15', 47'; Marcos 43'	Report		Stadium: Camp Nou; Attendance: 70,000; Referee: Ildefonso Urizar Azpitarte

==== Eighthfinals ====
13 March 1985 1st Leg	Barcelona	5–0	Hércules	Barcelona
	Schuster 24'; Gerardo 42'; Marcos 51'; Alexanko 61', 75'	Report		Stadium: Camp Nou; Attendance: 70,000; Referee: Martín Navarreta

3 April 1985 2nd Leg	Hércules	1–0 (1–5 agg.)	Barcelona	Alicante
	Sanabria 49' (pen.)	Report		Stadium: José Rico Pérez; Attendance: 15,000; Referee: Pérez Sánchez

==== Quarterfinals ====
17 April 1985 1st Leg	Real Betis	3–1	Barcelona	Seville
	Rincón 27', 67'; Gordillo 72'	Report	Calderé 76'	Stadium: Benito Villamarín; Attendance: 36,000; Referee: Emilio Soriano Aladrén

15 May 1985 2nd Leg	Barcelona	2–1 (3–4 agg.)	Real Betis	Barcelona
	Marcos 61'; Archibald 83'	Report	Gordillo 45'	Stadium: Camp Nou; Attendance: 70,000; Referee: Ildefonso Urizar Azpitarte

=== Friendlies ===
==== Ciutat de Palma Trophy ====
17 August 1984 Semifinals	Barcelona	2–1	Watford	Palma de Mallorca
	Schuster 1' (pen.); Rojo 31'	Report	Johnston 37'	Stadium: Lluís Sitjar Stadium

18 August 1984 Final	Barcelona	2–3	Universidad Católica	Palma de Mallorca
	Esteban 35'; Pichi Alonso 49' (pen.)	Report	Hurtado 36'; Aravena 41', 50'	Stadium: Lluís Sitjar Stadium

==== Joan Gamper Trophy ====
21 August 1984 Semifinals	Barcelona	9–1	Boca Juniors	Barcelona
	Alexanko 29', 60'; Archibald 31', 36'; Calderé 55'; Schuster 67'; Carrasco 69'; Esteban 81'; Marcos 86'	Report	Morena 73' (pen.)	Stadium: Camp Nou

22 August 1984 Final	Barcelona	3–1	Bayern Munich	Barcelona
	Carrasco 10', 27'; Calderé 46'	Report	Wohlfarth 53'	Stadium: Camp Nou

==== Ramón de Carranza Trophy ====
25 August 1984 Semifinals	Barcelona	0–1	Sporting de Gijón	Cádiz
		Report	Mesa 33'	Stadium: Ramón de Carranza

26 August 1984 Third place match	Cádiz CF	3–1	Barcelona	Cádiz
	Francis 2', 79'; S. Mejías 63'	Report	Víctor 82'	Stadium: Ramón de Carranza

==== Other friendlies ====
6 August 1984 Friendly	FC Barcelona	5–0	Andorra	Barcelona
				Stadium: Camp Nou

11 September 1984 Friendly	FC Barcelona	0–2	Athletic Bilbao	Barcelona
				Stadium: Camp Nou

20 September 1984 Friendly	L'Hospitalet	2–4	FC Barcelona	L'Hospitalet

25 September 1984 Friendly	Reus	1–3	FC Barcelona	Reus

4 October 1984 Friendly	Igualada	3–7	FC Barcelona

9 October 1984 Friendly	FC Barcelona	2–0	La Liga	Barcelona
				Stadium: Camp Nou

14 October 1984 Friendly	Jupiter	1–3	FC Barcelona

18 October 1984 Friendly	Sant Andreu	0–7	FC Barcelona

25 October 1984 Friendly	Calella	0–2	FC Barcelona

19 December 1984 Friendly	Gimnastic	1–3	FC Barcelona

8 April 1985 Friendly	Girona	1–4	FC Barcelona

9 June 1985 Friendly	FC Barcelona	2–0	Roma	Barcelona
				Stadium: Camp Nou
