= 1987–88 FC Barcelona season =

89th season in existence of FC Barcelona

FC Barcelona
1987–88 season
- President: Josep Lluís Núñez
- Manager: Terry Venables (until 23 September 1987); Luis Aragonés (until 23 May 1988); Carles Rexach
- Stadium: Camp Nou
- La Liga: 6th
- Copa del Rey: Winners (in UEFA Cup Winners' Cup)
- UEFA Cup: Quarter-finals
- Top goalscorer: League: Gary Lineker (16); All: Gary Lineker (20)
Home colours	Away colours

The 1987–88 season is FC Barcelona's 89th season in existence and the club's 57th consecutive season in the top flight of Spanish football.

== Squad ==
Note: Flags indicate national team as defined under FIFA eligibility rules; some limited exceptions apply. Players may hold more than one non-FIFA nationality.

No.	Pos.	Nation	Player
—	GK	ESP	Urruti
—	GK	ESP	Andoni Zubizarreta
—	GK	ESP	Covelo
—	DF	ESP	Esteve Fradera
—	DF	ESP	José Ramón Alexanko (captain)
—	DF	ESP	Julio Alberto
—	DF	ESP	Salva
—	DF	ESP	Josep Moratalla
—	DF	ESP	Migueli
—	DF	ESP	Sergi
—	DF	ESP	Manolo
—	DF	ESP	Cristóbal
—	DF	ESP	Gerardo
—	MF	ESP	Jordi Vinyals
—	MF	ESP	Víctor

No.	Pos.	Nation	Player
—	MF	ESP	Ramón Calderé
—	MF	ESP	Nayim
—	MF	FRG	Bernd Schuster
—	MF	ESP	Urbano
—	MF	ESP	Roberto
—	FW	ESP	Francisco López López
—	FW	ESP	Lobo Carrasco
—	FW	ESP	David Linde Sales
—	FW	ESP	Ángel Pedraza
—	FW	PAR	Raúl Amarilla
—	FW	ENG	Gary Lineker
—	FW	ESP	Paco Clos

== Competitions ==
=== La Liga ===
==== League table ====
Pos	Team	Pld	W	D	L	GF	GA	GD	Pts	Qualification or relegation
4	Athletic Bilbao	38	17	12	9	50	43	+7	46	Qualification for the UEFA Cup first round
5	Osasuna	38	15	10	13	40	34	+6	40	
6	Barcelona	38	15	9	14	49	44	+5	39	Qualification for the Cup Winners' Cup first round (Note: Barcelona qualified for the European Cup Winners' Cup as champions of the Copa del Rey.)
7	Celta Vigo	38	14	11	13	43	40	+3	39	
8	Valladolid	38	13	12	13	31	34	−3	38	

Source: BDFútbol
Rules for classification: 1) Points; 2) Head-to-head results; 3) Goal difference; 4) Number of goals scored

==== Results by round ====
Round	1	2	3	4	5	6	7	8	9	10	11	12	13	14	15	16	17	18	19	20	21	22	23	24	25	26	27	28	29	30	31	32	33	34	35	36	37	38
Ground	A	H	A	H	A	H	A	H	A	H	A	H	H	A	H	A	H	A	H	H	A	H	A	H	A	H	A	H	A	H	A	A	H	A	H	A	H	A
Result	W	L	L	L	L	L	W	D	W	W	W	W	W	L	L	L	W	D	L	D	D	W	D	L	W	D	L	W	L	L	W	D	W	D	W	L	W	D
Position	9	12	15	17	19	19	17	17	16	13	11	7	5	9	11	12	11	12	12	11	11	7	9	10	9	9	9	9	9	11	9	10	9	9	9	9	7	6

Source: BDFutbol
A = Away; H = Home; W = Win; D = Draw; L = Loss; = Leader, 1988–89 European Cup; = 1988–89 UEFA Cup; = 1988–89 Segunda División; c = 1988–89 UEFA Cup Winners' Cup

==== Matches ====
30 August 1987 1	Las Palmas	1–2	Barcelona	Las Palmas
	Durán 39'	Report	Mayé 51' (o.g.); Roberto 78'	Stadium: Estadio Insular; Referee: Victoriano Sánchez Arminio

6 September 1987 2	Barcelona	1–2	Sevilla	Barcelona
	Schuster 57'	Report	Bengoechea 47' (pen.); Cholo 83'	Stadium: Camp Nou; Referee: Emilio Soriano Aladrén

12 September 1987 3	RCD Español	2–0	Barcelona	Barcelona
	Pichi Alonso 61'; Orejuela 79'	Report		Stadium: Estadio Sarriá; Referee: José Donato Pes Pérez

20 September 1987 4	Barcelona	0–1	Valencia	Barcelona
		Report	Arroyo 20'	Stadium: Camp Nou; Referee: Ángel Calvo Córdova

26 September 1987 5	Athletic Bilbao	1–0	Barcelona	Bilbao
	Aguirre 2'	Report		Stadium: San Mamés; Referee: Antonio Martín Navarrete

3 October 1987 6	FC Barcelona	suspd.	Atlético Madrid	Barcelona
	Roberto 21'	Report	López Ufarte 56' (pen.); Marina 81'	Stadium: Camp Nou; Referee: Joaquín Ramos Marcos
Note: Match suspended at 70'.

18 October 1987 7	Sabadell	0–1	Barcelona	Sabadell
		Report	Schuster 51'	Stadium: Nova Creu Alta; Referee: Juan Andújar Oliver

25 October 1987 8	Barcelona	2–2	RCD Mallorca	Barcelona
	Lineker 39'; Gerardo 85'	Report	Fadil 54'; Nadal 66'	Stadium: Camp Nou; Referee: José Luis Pajares Paz

28 October 1987 6	Barcelona	1–2	Atlético Madrid	Barcelona
	Roberto 21'	Report	López Ufarte 56' (pen.); Marina 81'	Stadium: Camp Nou; Referee: Joaquín Ramos Marcos
Note: Match suspended on 3 October 1987 at 70' and replayed on 28 October 1987

1 November 1987 9	Logroñés	0–1	Barcelona	Logroño
		Report	Urbano 65'	Stadium: Las Gaunas; Referee: Joaquín Urío Velázquez

8 November 1987 10	Barcelona	2–0	Celta de Vigo	Barcelona
	Schuster 27'; Amarilla 51'	Report		Stadium: Camp Nou; Referee: Tomás Jiménez Moreno

21 November 1987 11	Real Betis	1-2	Barcelona	Seville
	Gabino 66'	Report	Schuster 50'; Lineker 85'	Stadium: Benito Villamarín; Referee: Ildefonso Urizar Azpitarte

29 November 1987 12	Barcelona	3-1	Cádiz CF	Barcelona
	Cristóbal 29'; Caldere 44'; Carrasco 59'	Report	Fernández 84'	Stadium: Camp Nou; Referee: José Mauro Socorro González

6 December 1987 13	Barcelona	4-1	Real Murcia	Barcelona
	Parra 2' (o.g.); Carrasco 18'; Lineker 57', 73'	Report	Manolo 82'	Stadium: Camp Nou; Referee: Fermín Sánchez-Molina Soto

12 December 1987 14	Real Sociedad	4-1	Barcelona	San Sebastián
	Górriz 20'; Zamora 24', 63'; Bakero 53'	Report	Roberto 76'	Stadium: Atocha; Referee: Teodoro Valdés Sánchez

20 December 1987 15	Barcelona	2-4	Real Valladolid	Barcelona
	Schuster 47' (pen.); Lineker 52'	Report	Manolo Hierro 23'; Peña 60', 72', 78'	Stadium: Camp Nou; Referee: José Merino González

2 January 1988 16	Real Madrid	2–1	FC Barcelona	Madrid
	Sánchez 22' (pen.), 41'	Report	Schuster 30' (pen.)	Stadium: Estadio Santiago Bernabéu; Referee: Joaquín Urío Velázquez

9 January 1988 17	Barcelona	1-0	Sporting Gijón	Barcelona
	Roberto 77'	Report		Stadium: Camp Nou; Referee: José Francisco Pérez Sánchez

17 January 1988 18	Real Zaragoza	1-1	Barcelona	Zaragoza
	Pardeza 71'	Report	Casuco 15' (o.g.)	Stadium: La Romareda; Referee: Joaquín Urío Velázquez

24 January 1988 19	Barcelona	0-1	Osasuna	Barcelona
		Report	Sarabia 82'	Stadium: Camp Nou; Referee: Severiano Pérez Sánchez

31 January 1988 20	Barcelona	1-1	Las Palmas	Barcelona
	Amarilla 76'	Report	Contreras 73'	Stadium: Camp Nou; Referee: José Ángel Paz García

7 February 1988 21	Sevilla	1-1	Barcelona	Seville
	Serna 76'	Report	Cristóbal 89'	Stadium: Ramón Sánchez Pizjuán; Referee: Ángel Calvo Córdova

10 February 1988 22	Barcelona	3-2	Español	Barcelona
	Lineker 1'; Schuster 27', 32' (pen.)	Report	Losada 8'; Lauridsen 53'	Stadium: Camp Nou; Referee: José Donato Pes Pérez

14 February 1988 23	Valencia	1-1	Barcelona	Valencia
	Giner 71'	Report	Urbano 39'	Stadium: Luis Casanova; Referee: José Francisco Pérez Sánchez

20 February 1988 24	Barcelona	1-2	Athletic Bilbao	Barcelona
	Roberto 62'	Report	Mendiguren 10'; Uralde 33'	Stadium: Camp Nou; Referee: Jaime Bayarri Ribelles

27 February 1988 25	Atlético Madrid	0-2	Barcelona	Madrid
		Report	Lineker 31', 56'	Stadium: Vicente Calderón; Referee: Raúl García de Loza

6 March 1988 26	Barcelona	0-0	Sabadell	Barcelona
		Report		Stadium: Camp Nou; Referee: Tomás Jiménez Moreno

9 March 1988 27	Mallorca	1-0	Barcelona	Palma de Mallorca
	Magdaleno 81'	Report		Stadium: Lluís Sitjar; Referee: José Merino González

12 March 1988 28	Barcelona	2-1	Logroñés	Barcelona
	Lineker 78'; Schuster 89'	Report	González 10'	Stadium: Camp Nou; Referee: Rafael Díaz Agüero

20 March 1988 29	Celta de Vigo	3-1	Barcelona	Vigo
	Noly 10' (pen.), 75' (pen.); Camilo 89'	Report	Lineker 80' (pen.)	Stadium: Balaídos; Referee: Juan Andújar Oliver

26 March 1988 30	Barcelona	0-1	Real Betis	Barcelona
		Report	José Luis 15' (pen.)	Stadium: Camp Nou; Referee: Juan Peraita Ibáñez

3 April 1988 31	Cádiz	0-2	FC Barcelona

10 April 1988 32	Real Murcia	0-0	FC Barcelona

17 April 1988 33	FC Barcelona	2-0	Real Sociedad	Barcelona
				Stadium: Camp Nou

24 April 1988 34	Real Valladolid	1-1	FC Barcelona

30 April 1988 35	FC Barcelona	2-0	Real Madrid	Barcelona
				Stadium: Camp Nou

8 May 1988 36	Sporting Gijón	1-0	FC Barcelona

14 May 1988 37	FC Barcelona	4-2	Real Zaragoza	Barcelona
				Stadium: Camp Nou

22 May 1988 38	Osasuna	1-1	FC Barcelona

=== Copa del Rey ===
==== Round of 32 ====
11 November 1987	Barcelona	2–0	Murcia	Barcelona
	Víctor 79'; Clos 89'	Report		Stadium: Camp Nou; Attendance: 25,000; Referee: Juan Peraita Ibáñez

2 December 1987	Murcia	0–3	Barcelona	Murcia
		Report	Víctor 14'; Carrasco 33'; Schuster 50'	Stadium: La Condomina; Attendance: 18,000; Referee: Victoriano Sánchez Arminio

==== Eightfinals ====
16 December 1987	Español	1–3	Barcelona	Barcelona
21:15 CET	Soler 12'	Report	Carrasco 20'; Víctor 32'; Roberto 90'	Stadium: Sarrià; Attendance: 30,000; Referee: Emilio Soriano Aladrén

6 January 1988	Barcelona	1–0	Español	Barcelona
	Schuster 69'	Report		Stadium: Camp Nou; Attendance: 20,000; Referee: Victoriano Sánchez Arminio

==== Quarterfinals ====
13 January 1988	Castellón	1–1	Barcelona	Castellón de la Plana
	Mel 38'	Report	Víctor 14'	Stadium: Nou Estadi Castalia; Attendance: 16,000; Referee: Juan Andújar Oliver

20 January 1988	Barcelona	2–0	Castellón	Barcelona
	Roberto 33'; Schuster 65'	Report		Stadium: Camp Nou; Referee: José Merino González

==== Semifinals ====
3 February 1988	Osasuna	0–0	Barcelona	Pamplona
		Report		Stadium: El Sadar; Referee: Emilio Soriano Aladrén

17 February 1988	Barcelona	3–0	Osasuna	Barcelona
	Clos 23'; Lineker 42', 84'	Report		Stadium: Camp Nou; Attendance: 70,000; Referee: Ildefonso Urízar Azpitarte

==== Final ====
30 March 1988	FC Barcelona	1–0	Real Sociedad

=== UEFA Cup ===
==== First round ====
16 September 1987	Barcelona (Spain)	2–0	(Portugal) Belenenses	Barcelona
	Moratalla 90'; Víctor 90+2'	Report		Stadium: Camp Nou; Referee: (Austria) Horst Brummeier

30 September 1987	Belenenses (Portugal)	1–0	(Spain) Barcelona	Lisbon
	Mapuata 7'	Report		Stadium: Estádio do Restelo; Referee: (Switzerland) Kurt Röthlisberger

==== Round of 32 ====
21 October 1987	Barcelona (Spain)	2–0	(Soviet Union) Dynamo Moscow	Barcelona
	Amarilla 10'; Schuster 28'	Report		Stadium: Camp Nou; Attendance: 26,000; Referee: (Netherlands) Bep Thomas

4 November 1987	Dynamo Moscow (Soviet Union)	0–0	(Spain) Barcelona	Moscow
		Report		Stadium: Central Dynamo Stadium; Attendance: 24,500; Referee: (Italy) Carlo Longhi

==== Eightfinals ====
25 November 1987	Barcelona (Spain)	4–1	(Albania) Flamurtari	Camp Nou, Barcelona
	Urbano 43'; Lineker 54', 58'; Carrasco 55'		V. Ruci 70' (pen.)	Attendance: 16,000; Referee: (France) Gérard Biguet

9 December 1987	Flamurtari (Albania)	1–0	(Spain) Barcelona	Flamurtari Stadium, Vlorë
	Kushta 15'			Attendance: 15,000; Referee: (East Germany) Siegfried Kirschen

==== Quarterfinals ====
2 March 1988	Bayer 04 Leverkusen (West Germany)	0–0	(Spain) FC Barcelona	Köln
				Stadium: Müngersdorfer Stadion; Attendance: 40,000; Referee: (France) Michel Vautrot

16 March 1988	FC Barcelona (Spain)	0–1	(West Germany) Bayer Leverkusen	Barcelona
			Tita 59'	Stadium: Camp Nou; Attendance: 32,500; Referee: (England) George Courtney

=== Friendlies ===
6 August 1987	Andorra	1–4	FC Barcelona

11 August 1987	FC Barcelona	5–3	FC Barcelona Athletic	Barcelona
				Stadium: Camp Nou

12 August 1987 Orange Trophy	Fiorentina	1–3	FC Barcelona

14 August 1987 Orange Trophy	Valencia CF	0–1	FC Barcelona

15 August 1987	FC Barcelona	4–3	Mollerusa	Barcelona
				Stadium: Camp Nou

18 August 1987 Joan Gamper Trophy	FC Barcelona	1–2	FC Porto	Barcelona
				Stadium: Camp Nou

19 August 1987 Joan Gamper Trophy	FC Barcelona	3–2	AFC Ajax	Barcelona
				Stadium: Camp Nou

20 August 1987	FC Barcelona	5–3	Sabadell	Barcelona
				Stadium: Camp Nou

22 August 1987	FC Barcelona	1–0	Figueres

24 August 1987 Trofeo Ciudad de Alicante	FC Barcelona	6–0	Hércules CF	Barcelona
				Stadium: Camp Nou

9 September 1987	FC Barcelona	4–0	Tortosa	Barcelona
				Stadium: Camp Nou

12 October 1987	FC Barcelona	0–1	Fraga	Barcelona
				Stadium: Camp Nou

27 May 1988 Copa Ciudad de Guayaquil	Barcelona SC	2–1	Barcelona

29 May 1988 Copa Ciudad de Guayaquil	Peñarol	0–4	Barcelona

== Statistics ==
=== Players statistics ===
No.	Pos	Nat	Player	Total		La Liga		Copa del Rey		UEFA Cup	
No.	Pos	Nat	Player	Apps	Goals	Apps	Goals	Apps	Goals	Apps	Goals
	GK	(Spain) ESP	Zubizarreta	55	-50	38	-44	9	-2	8	-4
	DF	(Spain) ESP	Josep Moratalla	39	0	25+1	0	7	0	6	0
	DF	(Spain) ESP	Migueli	37	0	23+1	0	7	0	6	0
	DF	(Spain) ESP	Julio Alberto	40	0	26	0	8	0	6	0
	MF	(Spain) ESP	Víctor Muñoz	51	5	35	0	9	4	7	1
	MF	(Spain) ESP	Urbano Ortega	49	4	31+4	3	6	0	8	1
	MF	(Spain) ESP	Robert	49	7	32+2	5	5+3	2	6+1	0
	MF	(Spain) ESP	Ramón Calderé	45	13	30	9	8	3	7	1
	MF	(West Germany) FRG	Bernd Schuster	45	13	30	9	8	3	7	1
	FW	(Spain) ESP	Lobo Carrasco	46	9	27+4	6	8	2	7	1
	FW	(England) ENG	Gary Lineker	50	20	34+2	16	6	2	8	2
	GK	(Spain) ESP	Urruti	0	0	0	0	0	0	0	0
	DF	(Spain) ESP	Gerardo	36	1	22	1	6+1	0	7	0
	DF	(Spain) ESP	Cristóbal	24	2	18+2	2	3+1	0	0	0
	DF	(Spain) ESP	Salva	25	0	11+5	0	3+2	0	1+3	0
	DF	(Spain) ESP	Alexanko	18	1	11+1	0	2+1	1	3	0
	DF	(Spain) ESP	Manolo	16	0	11+1	0	1+1	0	2	0
	FW	(Spain) ESP	Clos	18	2	7+7	0	4	2	0	0
	FW	(Spain) ESP	Pedraza	13	0	5+5	0	3	0	0	0
	FW	(Paraguay) PAR	Amarilla	11	3	5+4	2	1	0	1	1
	FW	(Spain) ESP	Linde	2	0	1+1	0	0	0	0	0
	MF	(Spain) ESP	Nayim	5	0	0+4	0	0	0	0+1	0
	FW	(Spain) ESP	Lopez López	1	0	0+1	0	0	0	0	0
	GK	(Spain) ESP	Covelo								
	DF	(Spain) ESP	Fradera								
	DF	(Spain) ESP	Sergi								
	MF	(Spain) ESP	Vinyals								
