= 1982–83 FC Barcelona season =

84th season in existence of FC Barcelona

FC Barcelona
1982–83 season
- President: Josep Lluís Núñez
- Manager: Udo Lattek (until 4 March 1983); José Luis Romero (until 7 March 1983); César Luis Menotti
- La Liga: 4th
- Copa del Rey: Winners
- Copa de la Liga: Winners
- Cup Winners' Cup: Quarter-finals
- UEFA Super Cup: Runners-up
- Top goalscorer: League: Diego Maradona (11); All: Diego Maradona (23)

The 1982–83 season was the 84th season in FC Barcelona's history.

The club won two trophies, the Copa del Rey and the Copa de la Liga.

== Season review ==
Barcelona began the season with a loss away to Valencia. They went on a 14 match unbeaten run, and lost to Athletic Bilbao at home. This was followed up by a loss to Las Palmas. However, Barca bounced back from the two losses, winning seven of their next eight matches. Following a loss at home to Racing de Santander, the club went through a downfall in form, losing three of their next eight matches. Despite a 7-2 routing of Las Palmas on the penultimate matchday, Barca were not able to end the season on a high note, losing to Osasuna 1-0 and finishing fourth.

Barcelona won the Copa del Rey against rivals Real Madrid, 2–1 at La Romareda, thanks to a 90th-minute goal from Marcos.

In the Cup Winners Cup, Barca were eliminated on away goals by Austria Wien.

In the Copa de La Liga, a new competition that began play this season, Barca entered in the QF, beating Gijon 1–0 on aggregate. Their next match was a 1–0 loss to Atletico Madrid in the SF, but a dominant 5–2 victory in the second leg put them in the finals, once again against Real Madrid. Barcelona won 4–3 on aggregate to lift their second trophy of the season.

== Squad ==
Note: Flags indicate national team as defined under FIFA eligibility rules; some limited exceptions apply. Players may hold more than one non-FIFA nationality.

No.	Pos.	Nation	Player
—	GK	ESP	Urruti
—	GK	ESP	Amador
—	GK	ESP	Pello Artola
—	DF	ESP	Migueli
—	DF	ESP	Julio Alberto
—	DF	ESP	Gerardo
—	DF	ESP	Esteban Vigo
—	DF	ESP	Antonio Olmo
—	DF	ESP	José Ramón Alexanko
—	DF	ESP	Josep Moratalla
—	DF	ESP	Manolo
—	MF	ESP	Víctor
—	MF	ESP	Urbano
—	MF	ESP	Periko Alonso

No.	Pos.	Nation	Player
—	MF	GER	Bernd Schuster
—	MF	ESP	Juan José Estella
—	MF	ESP	Tente Sánchez
—	FW	ESP	Marcos Alonso
—	FW	ESP	Pichi Alonso
—	FW	ESP	Lobo Carrasco
—	FW	DEN	Allan Simonsen
—	FW	ARG	Diego Armando Maradona
—	FW	ESP	Enrique Morán
—	FW	ESP	Paco Clos
—	FW	ESP	Quini

== Competitions ==
=== Friendlies ===
8 September 1982 Friendly	ACF Fiorentina	0–0	FC Barcelona

21 September 1982 friendly	Servette FC	1–4	FC Barcelona

26 October 1982	Villafranca	0–1	FC Barcelona

13 November 1982	PSG	1–4	FC Barcelona

3 August 1982 Friendly	SV Meppen	0–5	FC Barcelona

7 August 1982 Friendly	1. FC Kleve	0–6	FC Barcelona

13 August 1982 Teresa Herrera Trophy	Internacional	0–1	FC Barcelona

15 August 1982 Teresa Herrera Trophy	Dynamo Kyiv	4–1	FC Barcelona

21 August 1982 friendly	Mallorca	1–2	FC Barcelona

24 August 1982 Joan Gamper Trophy	FC Barcelona	0–0 (1–4 p)	Internacional

25 August 1982 Joan Gamper Trophy	FC Barcelona	1–1 (4–5 p)	FC Köln

28 August 1982 Trofeo Costa Verde	Red Star Belgrade	1-0	FC Barcelona

29 August 1982 Trofeo Costa Verde	Oviedo	0–1	FC Barcelona

29 May 1983	FC Barcelona	12–1	Catalonia 3rd Div. All Star XI

=== La Liga ===
==== League table ====
Pos	Team	Pld	W	D	L	GF	GA	GD	Pts	Qualification or relegation
2	Real Madrid	34	20	9	5	57	25	+32	49	Qualification for the UEFA Cup first round
3	Atlético Madrid	34	20	6	8	56	38	+18	46	Qualification for the UEFA Cup first round
4	Barcelona	34	17	10	7	60	29	+31	44	Qualification for the Cup Winners' Cup first round (Note: Barcelona qualified for the European Cup Winners' Cup by winning the Copa del Rey.)
5	Sevilla	34	15	12	7	44	31	+13	42	Qualification for the UEFA Cup first round
6	Zaragoza	34	17	6	11	59	39	+20	40	

Source: BDFútbol
Rules for classification: 1) Points; 2) Head-to-head results; 3) Goal difference; 4) Number of goals scored

==== Matches ====
4 September 1982 1	Valencia CF	2-1	FC Barcelona	Valencia
				Stadium: Mestalla

11 September 1982 2	FC Barcelona	3-0	Real Valladolid	Barcelona
				Stadium: Camp Nou

19 September 1982 3	Sevilla CF	0-0	FC Barcelona

25 September 1982 4	FC Barcelona	1-1	Real Zaragoza

2 October 1982 5	Atletico Madrid	1-1	FC Barcelona	Madrid
				Stadium: Estadio Vicente Calderon

9 October 1982 6	FC Barcelona	1-0	Español	Barcelona
				Stadium: Camp Nou

16 October 1982 7	Malaga	1-4	FC Barcelona

24 October 1982 8	FC Barcelona	1-1	Sporting Gijon	Barcelona
				Stadium: Camp Nou

30 October 1982 9	Racing Santander	0-4	FC Barcelona

6 November 1982 10	FC Barcelona	3-0	UD Salamanca	Barcelona
				Stadium: Camp Nou

10 November 1982 11	Real Betis	1-1	FC Barcelona	Seville

21 November 1982 12	FC Barcelona	2-2	Celta Vigo	Barcelona
				Stadium: Camp Nou

27 November 1982 13	Real Madrid	0-2	FC Barcelona	Madrid
				Stadium: Estadio Santiago Bernabeu

5 December 1982 14	FC Barcelona	1-0	Real Sociedad	Barcelona
				Stadium: Camp Nou

12 December 1982 15	FC Barcelona	0-1	Athletic Bilbao	Barcelona
				Stadium: Camp Nou

18 December 1982 16	UD Las Palmas	2-1	FC Barcelona	Las Palmas

2 January 1983 17	FC Barcelona	3-0	Osasuna	Barcelona
				Stadium: Camp Nou

5 January 1983 18	FC Barcelona	1-0	Valencia	Barcelona
				Stadium: Camp Nou

9 January 1983 19	Real Valladolid	1-3	FC Barcelona	Valladolid

15 January 1983 20	FC Barcelona	1-0	Sevilla	Barcelona
				Stadium: Camp Nou

21 January 1983 21	Real Zaragoza	2-2	FC Barcelona	Zaragoza

30 January 1983 22	FC Barcelona	2-1	Atletico de Madrid	Barcelona
				Stadium: Camp Nou

6 February 1983 23	RCD Espanyol	0-3	FC Barcelona	Barcelona

9 February 1983 24	FC Barcelona	2-1	Malaga	Barcelona
				Stadium: Camp Nou

19 February 1983 25	Sporting de Gijon	0-0	FC Barcelona	Gijon

26 February 1983 26	FC Barcelona	0-2	Racing de Santander	Barcelona
				Stadium: Camp Nou

5 March 1983 27	UD Salamanca	1-1	FC Barcelona	Salamanca

12 March 1983 28	FC Barcelona	1-1	Real Betis	Barcelona
				Stadium: Camp Nou

20 March 1983 29	Celta de Vigo	0-4	FC Barcelona	Vigo

26 March 1983 30	Barcelona	2-1	Real Madrid	Barcelona
				Stadium: Camp Nou

3 April 1983 31	Real Sociedad	1-0	Barcelona

10 April 1983 32	Athletic Bilbao	3-2	FC Barcelona	Bilbao

17 April 1983 33	Barcelona	7–2	Las Palmas	Barcelona
	Carrasco 2'; Marcos 4'; Maradona 12', 18', 57'; Schuster 35'; Alberto (yellow card) 40', (goal) 49'; Quini (yellow card) 82'		Martínez 39', 66'; Saavedra (yellow card) 61'	Stadium: Camp Nou; Referee: Joaquín Ramos Marcos

1 May 1983 34	Osasuna	1–0	FC Barcelona	Pamplona
	Echeverria 22'			Stadium: El Sadar; Referee: José Donato Pes Pérez

=== European Cup Winners' Cup ===
==== Second round ====
15 September 1982	Barcelona (Spain)	8–0	(Cyprus) Apollon Limassol	Barcelona
				Stadium: Camp Nou

29 September 1982	Apollon Limassol (Cyprus)	1–1	(Spain) Barcelona

==== Round of 16 ====
20 October 1982 R16 L1	FK Crvena Zvezda (Socialist Federal Republic of Yugoslavia)	2–4	(Spain) Barcelona

3 November 1982 Cup Win.Cup R16 L2	Barcelona (Spain)	2–1	(Socialist Federal Republic of Yugoslavia) FK Crvena Zvezda	Barcelona
				Stadium: Camp Nou

==== Quarter-finals ====
2 March 1983 QF L1	Austria Wien	0–0	(Spain) Barcelona

16 March 1983 QF L2	Barcelona (Spain)	1–1	Austria Wien	Barcelona
				Stadium: Camp Nou

=== European Super Cup ===
19 January 1983 1	Barcelona (Spain)	1–0	(England) Aston Villa	Barcelona
				Stadium: Camp Nou

26 January 1983 2	Aston Villa (England)	3–0 (3–1 agg.)	(Spain) Barcelona	Birmingham
				Stadium: Villa Park

=== Copa del Rey ===
==== Round of 16 ====
2 February 1983 R16 L1	Celta Vigo	0-0	FC Barcelona

22 February 1983 R16 L2	FC Barcelona	2-0	Celta Vigo	Barcelona
				Stadium: Camp Nou

==== Quarter-finals ====
30 March 1983 QF L1	Athletic Bilbao	1-0	FC Barcelona

13 April 1983 QF L2	FC Barcelona	3-0	Athletic Bilbao

==== Semi-finals ====
7 May 1983 SF L1	FC Barcelona	2-0	Real Sociedad

21 May 1983 SF L2	Real Sociedad	1-2	FC Barcelona

==== Final ====
4 June 1983	Barcelona	2–1	Real Madrid	La Romareda, Zaragoza
22:15 CET	Víctor 32'; Marcos 90'	Report	Santillana 50'	Attendance: 35,000; Referee: José Luis García Carrión

=== Copa de la Liga ===
12 June 1983 QF L1	Barcelona	1-0	Sporting Gijon

15 June 1983 QF L2	Sporting Gijon	0-0	Barcelona

==== Semi-finals ====
19 June 1983 SF L1	Atletico de Madrid	1-0	Barcelona

22 June 1983 SF L2	Barcelona	5-2	Atletico Madrid

==== Finals ====
26 June 1983 Final L1	Real Madrid	2-2	Barcelona

29 June1983 Final L2	Barcelona	2-1	Real Madrid
