= 1980–81 FC Barcelona season =

82nd season in existence of FC Barcelona

FC Barcelona
1980–81 season
- President: Josep Lluís Núñez
- Manager: Ladislao Kubala (until 9 November 1980); Helenio Herrera (11 May 1981); Udo Lattek
- La Liga: 5th
- Copa del Rey: Winners
- UEFA Cup: Second round
- Top goalscorer: League: Quini (20); All: Quini (30)

The 1980–81 season was the 82nd season for FC Barcelona.

== Squad ==
Note: Flags indicate national team as defined under FIFA eligibility rules; some limited exceptions apply. Players may hold more than one non-FIFA nationality.

No.	Pos.	Nation	Player
—	GK	ESP	Amador Lorenzo
—	GK	ESP	Pello Artola
—	DF	ESP	Migueli
—	DF	ESP	Pepito Ramos
—	DF	ESP	José Joaquín Aldabalejo
—	DF	ESP	Esteban Vigo
—	DF	ESP	Antonio Olmo
—	DF	ESP	José Ramón Alexanko
—	DF	ESP	Canito
—	DF	ESP	Manolo
—	MF	ESP	Julián Rubio
—	MF	ESP	Jordi Casas

No.	Pos.	Nation	Player
—	MF	ESP	Chus Landáburu
—	MF	GER	Bernd Schuster
—	MF	ESP	Juan José Estella
—	MF	ESP	Tente
—	MF	ESP	Paco Martínez
—	MF	ESP	Juan Manuel Asensi
—	FW	ESP	Ángel Pedraza
—	FW	ARG	Zuvíria
—	FW	ESP	Lobo Carrasco
—	FW	DEN	Allan Simonsen
—	FW	ESP	Carles Rexach
—	FW	ESP	Andrés Ramírez
—	FW	ESP	Quini
—	FW	AUT	Hans Krankl

=== La Liga ===
==== League table ====
Pos	Team	Pld	W	D	L	GF	GA	GD	Pts	Qualification or relegation
3	Atlético Madrid	34	17	8	9	59	41	+18	42 (Note: Atlético Madrid finished ahead of Valencia on head-to-head points: Atlético Madrid 3-1 Valencia, Valencia 0-0 Atlético Madrid.)	Qualification for the UEFA Cup first round
4	Valencia	34	16	10	8	46	39	+7	42	Qualification for the UEFA Cup first round
5	Barcelona	34	18	5	11	66	41	+25	41	Qualification for the Cup Winners' Cup first round (Note: Barcelona qualified to the Cup Winners' Cup as winners of the Copa del Rey.)
6	Real Betis	34	17	6	11	55	38	+17	40	
7	Sporting Gijón	34	14	10	10	58	40	+18	38	

Source: BDFútbol
Rules for classification: 1) Points; 2) Head-to-head results; 3) Goal difference; 4) Number of goals scored

== Results ==
GAMES
5-8-1980 FRIENDLY VITESSE ARNHEIM-BARCELONA 1–2

9-8-1980 FRIENDLY ARMINIA BIELEFELD-BARCELONA 1–2

12-8-1980 Millennium of Brussels RACING WHITE-BARCELONA 1–2

13-8-1980 Millennium of Brussels ANDERLECHT-BARCELONA 2-2 /5-4/ PENALTY

19-8-1980 Joan Gamper Trophy BARCELONA-PSV 2–1

20-8-1980 Joan Gamper Trophy BARCELONA-VASCO DA GAMA 2–1

23-8-1980 Trofeo Cidade de Vigo ATLETICO MINEIRO-BARCELONA 1-1 /2-3/ PENALTY

23-8-1980 Trofeo Cidade de Vigo CELTA DE VIGO-BARCELONA 3–2

27–8–1980, FRIENDLY GIRONA-BARCELONA 1–2

1-9-1980 FRIENDLY INTERNACIONAL-BARCELONA 2–2

7-9-1980 LIGA MURCIA-BARCELONA 1–2

10-9-1980 FRIENDLY LLORET-BARCELONA 0–2

13-9-1980 LIGA BARCELONA -ESPANYOL 3–1

16-9-1980 UEFA Cup SLIEMA WANDERERS-BARCELONA 0–2

21-9-1980 LIGA S.GIJON-BARCELONA 2–1

23-09-1980 FRIENDLY LLEIDA-BARCELONA 1–7

27-9-1980 LIGA BARCELONA -VALENCIA 0–3

1-10-1980 UEFA Cup BARCELONA-SLIEMA WANDERERS 1–0

5-10-1980 LIGA OSASUNA-BARCELONA 1–0

12-10-1980 LIGA BARCELONA -LAS PALMAS 1–0

14-10-1980 FRIENDLY GRANOLLERS-BARCELONA 1–9

19-10-1980 LIGA REAL SOCIEDAD-BARCELONA 2–0

22-10-1980 UEFA Cup KOLN-BARCELONA 0–1

26-10-1980 LIGA BARCELONA -BETIS 1–3

31-10-1980 FRIENDLY AMPOSTA-BARCELONA 0–6

2-11-1980 LIGA HERCULES-BARCELONA 0–1

5-11-1980 UEFA Cup BARCELONA-KOLN 0–4

9-11-1980 LIGA BARCELONA -ATLETICO DE MADRID 4–2

12-11-1980 FRIENDLY BARCELONA-SABADELL 4–1

16-11-1980 LIGA BARCELONA -SALAMANCA 3–0

22-11-1980 COPA DEL REY LLEIDA-BARCELONA 1–2

23-11-1980 LIGA ZARAGOZA-BARCELONA 1–2

30-11-1980 LIGA BARCELONA -REAL MADRID 2–1

3-12-1980 COPA DEL REY BARCELONA-LLEIDA 5–1

7-12-1980 LIGA VALLADOLID-BARCELONA 1–1

10-12-1980 FRIENDLY TORTOSA-BARCELONA 1–6

13-12-1980 LIGA BARCELONA -ALMERIA 6–0

16-12-1980 FRIENDLY BARCELONA-HUMAN STARS 3–2

21-12-1980 LIGA ATHLETIC DE BILBAO-BARCELONA 4–1

28-12-1980 LIGA BARCELONA -SEVILLA 3–1

4-1-1981 LIGA BARCELONA-MURCIA 1–0

7-1-1981 COPA DEL REY BARAKALDO-BARCELONA 0–2

11-1-1981 LIGA ESPANYOL-BARCELONA 1–0

14-01-1980 FRIENDLY BARCELONA-EUROPA 4–3

18-1-1981 LIGA BARCELONA-SPORTING 3–1

21-1-1981 COPA DEL REY BARCELONA-BARAKALDO 1–1

25-1-1981 LIGA VALENCIA-BARCELONA 3–3

28-01-1981 FRIENDLY EUROPA-BARCELONA 2–3

1-2-1981 LIGA BARCELONA-OSASUNA 6–0

8-2-1981 LIGA LAS PALMAS-BARCELONA 1–4

15-2-1981 LIGA BARCELONA-REAL SOCIEDAD 2–0

19-02-1981 FRIENDLY BARCELONA-IGUALDA 6–2

22-2-1981 LIGA BETIS-BARCELONA 1–1

25-02-1981 FRIENDLY VILANOVA-BARCELONA 1–6

1-3-1981 LIGA BARCELONA-HERCULES 6–0

04-03-1981 FRIENDLY BARCELONA-GRAMANET 3–2

8-3-1981 LIGA ATLETICO DE MADRID-BARCELONA 1–0

11-03-1981 FRIENDLY BARCELONA-JUPITER 10–2

15-3-1981 LIGA SALAMANCA-BARCELONA 2–1

19-03-1981 FRIENDLY SANT ANDREU-BARCELONA 1–6

22-3-1981 LIGA BARCELONA-ZARAGOZA 0–0

26-03-1981 FRIENDLY VIC-BARCELONA 1–3

29-3-1981 LIGA REAL MADRID-BARCELONA 3–0

01-04-1981 FRIENDLY VILAFRANCA-BARCELONA 3–1

05-4-1981 LIGA BARCELONA-VALLADOLID 2–1

09-04-1981 FRIENDLY IGUALADA-BARCELONA 2–1

12-4-1981 LIGA ALMERIA-BARCELONA 2–5

16-04-1981 FRIENDLY L'ESCALA-BARCELONA 1–7

19-4-1981 LIGA BARCELONA-ATHLETIC DE BILBAO 0–1

26-04-1981 LIGA SEVILLA-BARCELONA 1–1

30-04-1981 COPA DEL REY CASTILLA-BARCELONA 3–5

05-05-1981 COPA DEL REY BARCELONA-CASTILLA 4–1

09-05-1981 President Cup of Mexico City CRUZ AZUL-BARCELONA 3–1

11-05-1981 President Cup of Mexico City ATLETICO MADRID-BARCELONA 0–2

14-05-1981 FRIENDLY SELECT JALISCO-BARCELONA 1–0

20-05-1981 COPA DEL REY RAYO VALLECANO-BARCELONA 0–3

24-05-1981 FRIENDLY BARCELONA-PUEBLA 2–1

28-05-1981 FRIENDLY SABADELL-BARCELONA 2–2

31-05-1981 COPA DEL REY BARCELONA-RAYO VALLECANO 4–1

7-06-1981 COPA DEL REY BARCELONA-ATHLETIC DE BILBAO 2–0

10-06-1981 FRIENDLY MANRESA-BARCELONA 2–8

13-06-1981 COPA DEL REY ATHLETIC DE BILBAO-BARCELONA 1–2

18-06-1981 COPA DEL REY FINAL BARCELONA-SPORTING GIJON 3–1

21-06-1981 FRIENDLY BARCELONA-RED STAR BELGRADE 2-2
