= Steve Archibald =

Scottish footballer and manager (born 1956)

Personal information
- Full name: Steven Archibald
- Date of birth: 27 September 1956 (age 70)
- Place of birth: Glasgow, Scotland
- Position: Striker

Youth career
- 1973–1974: Fernhill Athletic

Senior career*
Years	Team	Apps	(Gls)
1974	East Stirlingshire (trial)	1	(0)
1974–1977	Clyde	65	(7)
1977–1980	Aberdeen	76	(29)
1980–1984	Tottenham Hotspur	131	(58)
1984–1988	Barcelona	55	(24)
1986	Barcelona Atlètic	2	(0)
1987–1988	→ Blackburn Rovers (loan)	20	(6)
1988–1990	Hibernian	44	(15)
1990	Espanyol	15	(5)
1990–1991	St Mirren	16	(2)
1992	Clyde	4	(2)
1992	Reading	1	(0)
1992	Ayr United	1	(0)
1992	Fulham	2	(0)
1994–1996	East Fife	49	(7)
1996	Home Farm Everton	1	(0)
Total		483	(156)

International career
1979–1980	Scotland U21	5	(1)
1980–1986	Scotland	27	(4)

Managerial career
- 1994–1996: East Fife
- 2000–2001: Airdrieonians
- * Club domestic league appearances and goals

Steven Archibald (born 27 September 1956) is a Scottish former professional footballer and manager. He played prominently as a forward for Aberdeen, winning the Scottish league in 1980, Tottenham Hotspur, winning two FA Cups and a UEFA Cup, and Barcelona, winning the Spanish league in 1985. He also played for several other clubs in Scotland, England, Spain and Ireland.

Archibald played 27 times for Scotland, earning selection for their 1982 and 1986 World Cup squads, and was inducted into the Scottish Football Hall of Fame in 2009. He later managed East Fife and Airdrieonians.

== Club career ==
Archibald was born in Glasgow and raised nearby in Rutherglen. He was playing for local teams such as Croftfoot United and Fernhill Athletic while completing his training as a car mechanic when he was spotted by Scottish First Division club Clyde in 1974. He first came to prominence playing in midfield for Clyde, but after manager Billy McNeill paid £20,000 to bring him to top-division side Aberdeen in January 1978 he was converted to striker, forging a prolific partnership with Joe Harper.

After winning the Scottish Premier Division title in 1980, he moved to London club Tottenham Hotspur for £800,000, where he finished the top scorer in the First Division and won the FA Cup in his first season there. He won a second FA Cup in 1982 and then the UEFA Cup in 1984, where he scored his penalty in the final as Spurs overcame Anderlecht in a shootout. He also scored for Spurs in their defeat by Liverpool in the 1982 Football League Cup Final. Archibald scored 77 goals in 189 appearances for Spurs between 1980 and 1984, forming striking partnerships with Garth Crooks and Mark Falco.

In 1984, he joined Barcelona for £1,150,000, where in his first season he helped them win the La Liga title for the first time in 11 years. He then helped Barça reach the European Cup final in 1986, only to lose on penalty kicks to Steaua Bucharest. He was a popular figure at the Camp Nou until restrictions on fielding foreign players led to him being excluded from the squad in favour of Gary Lineker and Mark Hughes. He was loaned out to Blackburn Rovers for a spell before returning to Scotland in 1988 to sign for Hibernian.

Archibald scored 16 goals in his first season at Hibernian, including the winning goal in November 1988 in a 2–1 win away against Hearts, Hibs' first away win against their city rivals in over 10 years. He left Hibs in 1990 after falling out with manager Alex Miller, and had a brief return to Spain with Espanyol (then in the Second Division). He then joined St Mirren and was instrumental in bringing former Barcelona teammate Víctor Muñoz to the club.

Archibald's later career saw him make a handful of appearances at a number of clubs in Scotland, England and Ireland, including a nostalgic return to Clyde.

== International career ==
Archibald was a member of the Scotland national team at the 1982 and 1986 World Cups.

On 15 November 2009, he was inducted into the Scottish Football Hall of Fame.

== Managerial career and the Airdrie experiment ==
Archibald's time at East Fife saw the club gain promotion to the First Division, and was also notable for the acquisition of Trinidad and Tobago internationalists Arnold Dwarika and Craig Demmin. He was sacked in 1996 and retired to his home in Spain for the next few years, working on a number of business interests, including as a football agent.

In 2000 Archibald re-emerged in Scottish football when he mounted a bid to buy financially troubled First Division club Airdrieonians. Archibald was allowed to take over the running of the club after being awarded preferred bidder status by the administrators. He installed himself as manager and, using his contacts in Europe, introduced a contingent of Spaniards and other foreign players to the squad, winning the 2000–01 Scottish Challenge Cup.

Although Airdrie supporters were impressed by Archibald and the skills of the imports, he ultimately failed to conclude the purchase of the club, leading to the departure of himself and the foreign players in March 2001, and causing them to narrowly miss out on relegation to the Second Division. They had also been expelled from the Scottish Cup for failing to fulfil a fixture. Airdrieonians went out of business on 1 May 2002, and a new club called Airdrie United was formed and took Clydebank's place in the Scottish Football League.

== Music career ==
Archibald appeared twice in the same episode of Top of the Pops in 1982, firstly singing "We Have a Dream" with the Scotland World Cup squad starring BA Robertson and then alongside his Tottenham Hotspur teammates and Chas & Dave singing "Tottenham, Tottenham".

== Career statistics ==
=== Club ===
Appearances and goals by club, season and competition
Club	Season	League			National cup		League cup		Europe		Other		Total	
Club	Season	Division	Apps	Goals	Apps	Goals	Apps	Goals	Apps	Goals	Apps	Goals	Apps	Goals
East Stirlingshire (trial)	1973–74	Scottish Division Two	1	0	0	0	0	0	-	-	-	-	1	0
Clyde	1974–75	Scottish Division One	4	0	0	0	0	0	-	-	-	-	4	0
Clyde	1975–76	Scottish First Division	16	2	2	0	2	0	-	-	-	-	20	2
Clyde	1976–77	Scottish Second Division	31	3	1	0	6	0	-	-	-	-	38	3
Clyde	1977–78	Scottish Second Division	14	2	2	0	2	0	-	-	-	-	18	2
Clyde	Total		65	7	5	0	10	0	-	-	-	-	80	7
Aberdeen	1977–78	Scottish Premier Division	10	5	0	0	0	0	0	0	-	-	10	5
Aberdeen	1978–79	Scottish Premier Division	32	13	5	4	7	3	4	0	-	-	48	20
Aberdeen	1979–80	Scottish Premier Division	34	12	5	7	11	3	2	0	-	-	52	22
Aberdeen	Total		76	30	10	11	18	6	6	0	-	-	110	47
Tottenham Hotspur	1980–81	First Division	41	20	-	3	-	2	0	0	-	-	41+	25
Tottenham Hotspur	1981–82	First Division	27	6	-	1	-	2	-	0	-	-	27+	9
Tottenham Hotspur	1982–83	First Division	31	11	-	0	-	2	-	2	-	-	31+	15
Tottenham Hotspur	1983–84	First Division	32	21	-	1	-	1	-	5	-	-	32+	28
Tottenham Hotspur	Total		131	58	18	5	18	7	22	7	-	-	189	77
Barcelona	1984–85	La Liga	32	15	8	3	4	1	2	0	-	-	46	19
Barcelona	1985–86	La Liga	13	4	3	1	1	1	4	2	1	0	22	8
Barcelona	1986–87	La Liga	10	5	0	0	0	0	0	0	2	0	12	5
Barcelona	1987–88	La Liga	0	0	0	0	0	0	0	0	-	-	0	0
Barcelona	Total		55	24	11	4	5	2	6	2	3	0	80	32
Blackburn Rovers (loan)	1987–88	Second Division	20	6	-	-	-	-	-	-	-	-	20+	6+
Hibernian	1988–89	Scottish Premier Division	31	13	4	1	3	2	0	0	-	-	38	16
Hibernian	1989–90	Scottish Premier Division	13	2	0	0	0	0	2	0	-	-	15	2
Hibernian	Total		44	15	4	1	3	2	2	0	-	-	53	18
Espanyol	1989–90	Segunda División	15	5	-	-	-	-	-	-	-	-	15+	5+
St Mirren	1990–91	Scottish Premier Division	16	2	1	0	0	0	0	0	-	-	17	2
Clyde	1991–92	Scottish Second Division	4	2	0	0	0	0	0	0	-	-	4	2
Reading	1991–92	Third Division	1	0	0	0	0	0	0	0	-	-	1	0
Ayr United	1991–92	Scottish First Division	1	0	-	-	-	-	-	-	-	-	1+	0+
Fulham	1992–93	Second Division	2	0	0	0	0	0	0	0	-	-	2	0
East Fife	1994–95	Scottish Second Division	13	1	-	-	-	-	-	-	-	-	13+	1+
East Fife	1995–96	Scottish Second Division	31	6	-	-	-	-	-	-	-	-	31+	6+
East Fife	1996–97	Scottish First Division	5	0	-	-	-	-	-	-	-	-	5+	0+
East Fife	Total		49	7	-	-	-	-	-	-	-	-	49+	7+
Home Farm Everton	1996–97		1	0	-	-	-	-	-	-	-	-	1+	0+
Career total			483	156	49+	21+	54+	17+	36	9	1	0	623+	203+

=== International ===
Appearances and goals by national team and year
National team	Year	Apps	Goals
Scotland	1980	5	2
Scotland	1981	7	1
Scotland	1982	8	1
Scotland	1983	1	0
Scotland	1984	2	0
Scotland	1985	3	0
Scotland	1986	1	0
Total		27	4

Scores and results list Scotland's goal tally first, score column indicates score after each Archibald goal.

List of international goals scored by Steve Archibald
No.	Date	Venue	Opponent	Score	Result	Competition
1	26 March 1980	Hampden Park, Glasgow	Portugal	3–0	4–1	UEFA Euro 1980 qualifying
2	31 May 1980	Nepstadion, Budapest	Hungary	1–2	1–3	Friendly
3	19 May 1981	Hampden Park, Glasgow	Northern Ireland	2–0	2–0	1980–81 British Home Championship
4	15 June 1982	Estadio La Rosaleda, Málaga	New Zealand	5–2	5–2	1982 FIFA World Cup

== Managerial statistics ==
Team	From	To	Record				
Team	From	To	G	W	D	L	Win %
East Fife	1994	1996	90	35	25	30	38.89%
Airdrieonians	2000	2001	-	-	-	-	-
Total			90+	35+	25+	30+	38.89%

== Honours ==
=== Player ===
Aberdeen

- Scottish Premier Division: 1979–80

Tottenham Hotspur

- FA Cup: 1980–81, 1981–82
- FA Charity Shield: 1981 (shared)
- UEFA Cup: 1983–84
- Football League Cup runner-up: 1981–82

Barcelona

- La Liga: 1984–85
- Copa de la Liga: 1986

Scotland

- The Rous Cup: 1985

=== Manager ===
Airdrieonians

- Scottish Challenge Cup: 2000–01

=== Individual ===
- Inducted to Scottish Football Hall of Fame: 2009
- Football League First Division top goalscorer: 1980–81
