= Bernd Schuster =

German footballer (born 1959)

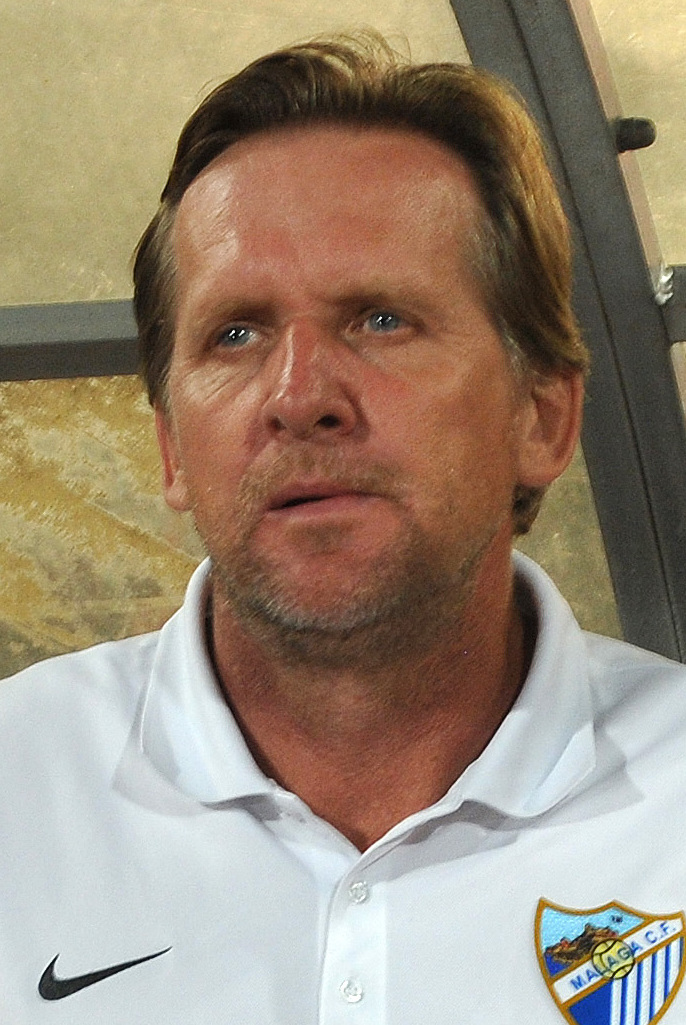
- Schuster as coach of Málaga in 2013

Personal information
- Full name: Bernd Schuster
- Date of birth: 22 December 1959 (age 66)
- Place of birth: Augsburg, West Germany
- Height: 1.81 m (5 ft 11 in)
- Position: Midfielder

Youth career
- 1969–1976: SV Hammerschmiede Augsburg
- 1976–1978: FC Augsburg

Senior career*
Years	Team	Apps	(Gls)
1978–1980	1. FC Köln	61	(10)
1980–1988	Barcelona	170	(63)
1988–1990	Real Madrid	61	(13)
1990–1993	Atlético Madrid	85	(11)
1993–1996	Bayer Leverkusen	59	(8)
1996–1997	Pumas UNAM	9	(0)
Total		445	(105)

International career
1977–1979	West Germany U18	10	(2)
1980	West Germany U21	1	(0)
1979–1984	West Germany	21	(4)

Managerial career
- 1997–1998: Fortuna Köln
- 1998–1999: 1. FC Köln
- 2001–2003: Xerez
- 2003–2004: Shakhtar Donetsk
- 2004–2005: Levante
- 2005–2007: Getafe
- 2007–2008: Real Madrid
- 2010–2011: Beşiktaş
- 2013–2014: Málaga
- 2018–2019: Dalian Yifang
Medal record
Representing West Germany
Men's football
UEFA European Championship
Winner	1980 Italy
- * Club domestic league appearances and goals

Bernd Schuster (born 22 December 1959) is a German former professional footballer of the late 1970s through early 1990s, who won club titles playing for the Spanish sides Barcelona (1980–1988) and Real Madrid (1988–1990). He played as a midfielder and was nicknamed "der Blonde Engel" (the Blond Angel) by the fans. After retiring as a player, he managed a number of European clubs, including Real Madrid, taking them to the league title in the 2007–08 season.

== Club career ==
Schuster started his professional career with 1. FC Köln at age 18 in 1978 after a number of promising performances with the West German Under-18 National team. Schuster left Köln after the 1980 European campaign to sign with Spain's FC Barcelona, where he flourished. During his career, he played for clubs Real Madrid, Atlético Madrid and Bayer Leverkusen. At his final team, the Mexican side Pumas de la UNAM he appeared in ten matches in spring 1997.

=== Barcelona ===
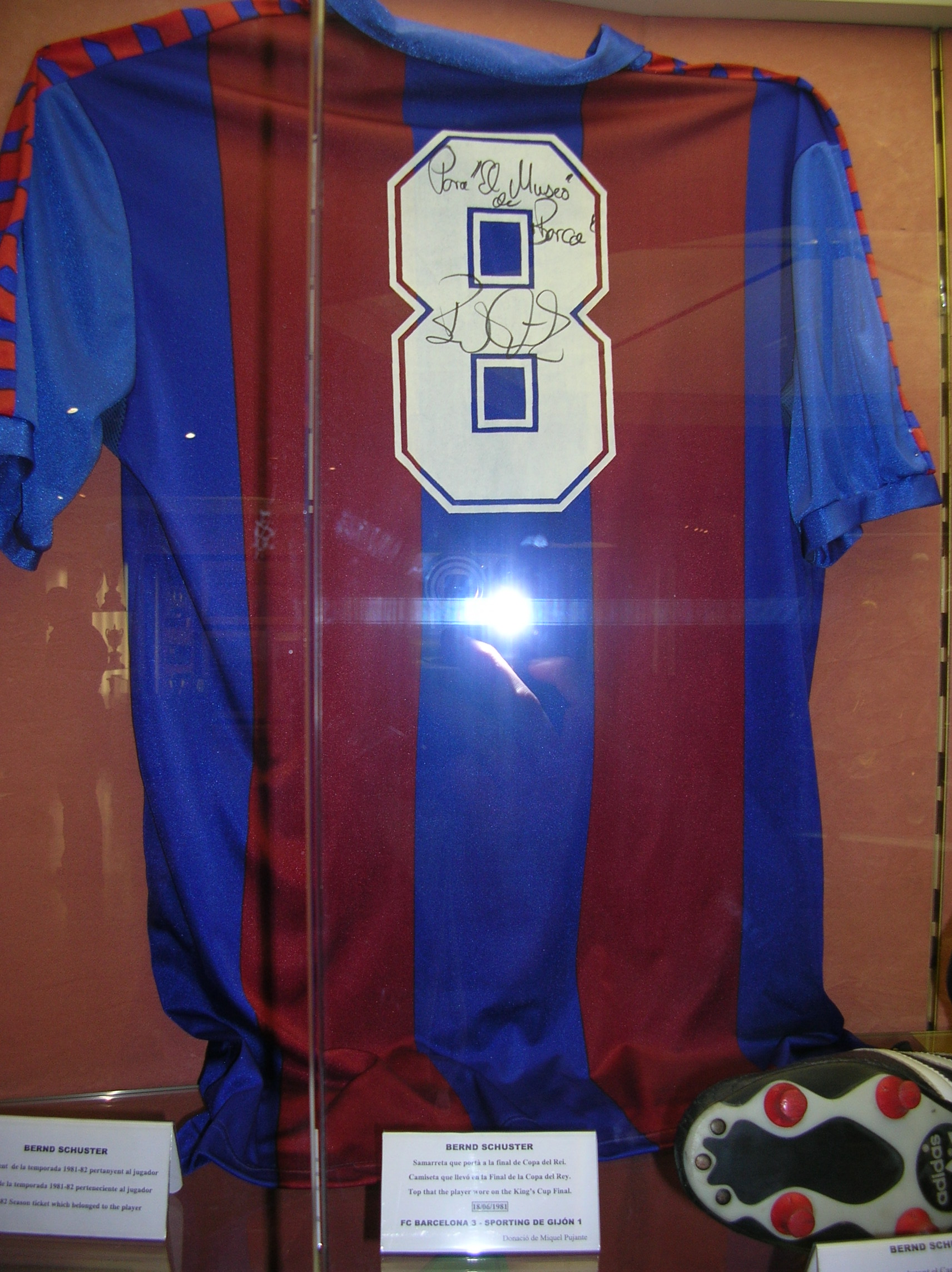
Schuster t-shirt from FC Barcelona as football player

Schuster contributed significantly to FC Barcelona during the 1980s, playing as a midfielder and regularly scoring goals, as evidenced by his goal tally during this period. His club president Josep Lluís Núñez and some trainers like Helenio Herrera, Udo Lattek, Terry Venables and Luis Aragonés had difficult relations with him. While in Barcelona, though, he won the European Silver Ball in 1980 and the Bronze Ball in 1981 and 1985.

At age 21, in 1981, he was badly injured on his right knee by Athletic Bilbao defender Andoni Goikoetxea, who had a reputation for aggressive tackling, as noted in contemporaneous accounts.

In 2024, Pep Guardiola, was asked in an interview to name the five players he'd pick from football history to play in a five-a-side and, among them, picked Schuster, whom, he said, he used to watch as a ball boy at the stadium and "was completely in love" with his playing.

=== Real Madrid ===
Schuster's move to Real Madrid was controversial due to the strong rivalry between Barcelona and Madrid. His style complemented the group of home-grown Madrid players known as la Quinta del Buitre, who were instrumental in the team's success in the Spanish Championship during the 1980s.

=== Atlético Madrid ===
Schuster signed with Atlético Madrid in autumn 1990 and helped improve the performance of Atlético. His long precise passes helped restore Atlético Madrid as a prominent club.

=== Bayer Leverkusen ===
In 1993, Schuster returned home to Germany to play for three seasons with Bayer Leverkusen. Despite his contributions, the club was unable to capture Bundesliga and German Cup titles but his performances led to discussions among fans and pundits about his potential inclusion in the 1994 World Cup squad. In the national TV-Station ARD "Goal of the year" election Schuster won the first three places in 1994. In the UEFA Golden Jubilee Poll to name the finest European players of the last five decades, Schuster finished 40th.

== International career ==
Schuster was part of the West Germany national team that won the 1980 UEFA European Football Championship in Italy, appearing in two of West Germany's four matches. His performances there helped him earn the Silver Ball Trophy honour as the Europe's second best player in 1980 behind Golden Ball winner, and West Germany team-mate Karl-Heinz Rummenigge. His refusal to take part in a match against Albania to be home for the birth of his second son David caused a sporting scandal at the time. Schuster retired from the West Germany national team at the age of 24, due to his repeated disagreements with the German Football Association, then national team manager Jupp Derwall, and teammates including Paul Breitner. According to Schuster, it was due to a major disagreement with the managements of both Barcelona and the West Germany national team on either side of a friendly match against Brazil. Overall Schuster won 21 caps for the then West Germany national team.

== Style of play ==
Schuster is considered one of the best midfielders of his generation. Earlier in his career, Schuster operated as a box-to-box attacking midfielder with good creative abilities, good dribbling and good pace. Injuries at Barcelona would cause him to lose his pace, which led his coaches to move him to a deep-lying playmaking role, where his technique, vision and excellent passing abilities allowed him to excel at dictating the tempo of the game and provide chances for his teammates through short and long passes. He was also an expert free-kick taker and possessed a powerful shot that allowed him to score goals from a distance. Primarily a midfielder, Schuster was also capable of playing as a sweeper, a position that he played in his years as a youngster at Köln and at Real Madrid, where his creativity and technique allowed him to start attacks from the back.

Schuster was also praised for his leadership skills and commanding presence on the pitch. Despite his talent as a player, Schuster struggled with injuries throughout his career and was known for his outspoken nature, which sometimes led to disagreements with coaches, players, and journalists. He was nicknamed "The Blonde Angel" because of his long blonde hair.

Many coaches and players have praised Schuster's talent as a footballer. Schuster's first coach at Köln Hennes Weisweiler described him as the best player he ever coached, and believed he could have been Franz Beckenbauer's successor. An admirer of Schuster, Köln coach Rinus Michels lamented his departure to Barcelona, believing that it was impossible to find a perfect replacement for him. Atlético Madrid coach Luis Aragonés praised his reading of the game and ability to play the right pass at the right time.

Marcel Desailly and Xavi have cited Schuster as an idol.

== Coaching career ==
=== Fortuna Köln ===
Schuster was the coach of Fortuna Köln between 1 July 1997 and 30 June 1998.

=== 1. FC Köln ===
Schuster was coach of 1. FC Köln from 1 July 1998 to 30 June 1999. Schuster was unable to get the club promoted. In 2000, he applied for the manager job at Scottish club Dundee FC, but the Dundee chairman rejected his application.

=== Xerez ===
Schuster became coach of Xerez on 26 June 2001. Schuster coached the team successfully for two seasons. The second and third best seasons in the history of the club. However, he could not get the club promoted to La Liga.

=== Shakhtar Donetsk ===
In June 2003, he accepted a deal to coach Shakhtar Donetsk starting on 1 July 2003. Schuster established a club record number of consecutive victories. However, the team did not win the championship and did not reach the final round of the Champions League with a match against Lokomotiv Moscow. Schuster was sacked on 5 May 2004, one week before his team played and won the Ukrainian Cup final in 2004.

=== Levante ===
Schuster returned to Spain in summer 2004 to coach Levante. Schuster was sacked on 1 May 2005. The sacking came with a 5-point advantage over the relegation zone with five matches remaining. However, Levante could not win a game and fell to the Segunda División again.

=== Getafe ===
Schuster moved to Getafe in the summer of 2005. Schuster led them to their best season in team history under his guidance. Schuster coached Getafe in their second successful season and the team did even better, seventh in La Liga. Getafe also secured entry to the 2007–08 UEFA Cup as a result of reaching the final of the Copa del Rey after overcoming a 5–2 first leg semi-final defeat against Barcelona, beating them 4–0 in the second leg.

=== Real Madrid ===
Schuster was appointed coach of Real Madrid on 9 July 2007. As manager, he made a successful start with Real Madrid, taking them to the top of the La Liga standings. Attacking football returned again to the Santiago Bernabéu stadium with Madrid having the strongest offence, not beaten at home from the start of the league and defeating their arch rival Barcelona at their home ground Camp Nou, increasing their lead to seven points between them and second place (Barcelona).

The team qualified for the second round of the UEFA Champions League, leading their group, which contained Olympiacos, Werder Bremen and Lazio. He changed Real Madrid's style of play, switching from the defensive football during the reign of Fabio Capello to fast-paced, attacking football. After losing 2–1 to Roma in the second leg of the UEFA Champions League, which meant the elimination of Real Madrid, many doubted that Schuster would continue to be Madrid's coach, but the club denied the allegations. On 4 May 2008, Schuster guided Real Madrid to their 31st title with three games to spare.

On 18 May 2008, Schuster's Real Madrid achieved the highest point total (85 points), a record that was set by rivals Barcelona. He went on to win the Supercopa de España. Although enjoying a successful season with Madrid, Schuster had frequent confrontations with the media. Sometimes refusing to answer questions, making controversial or sarcastic statements and walking out of press conferences. On 9 December 2008, Schuster stepped down as coach after a 4–3 defeat to Sevilla FC, and speaking out publicly about his team standing no chance of beating Barcelona (coached by Pep Guardiola at the time) in the El Clásico derby match. He was replaced by Juande Ramos.

=== Beşiktaş ===
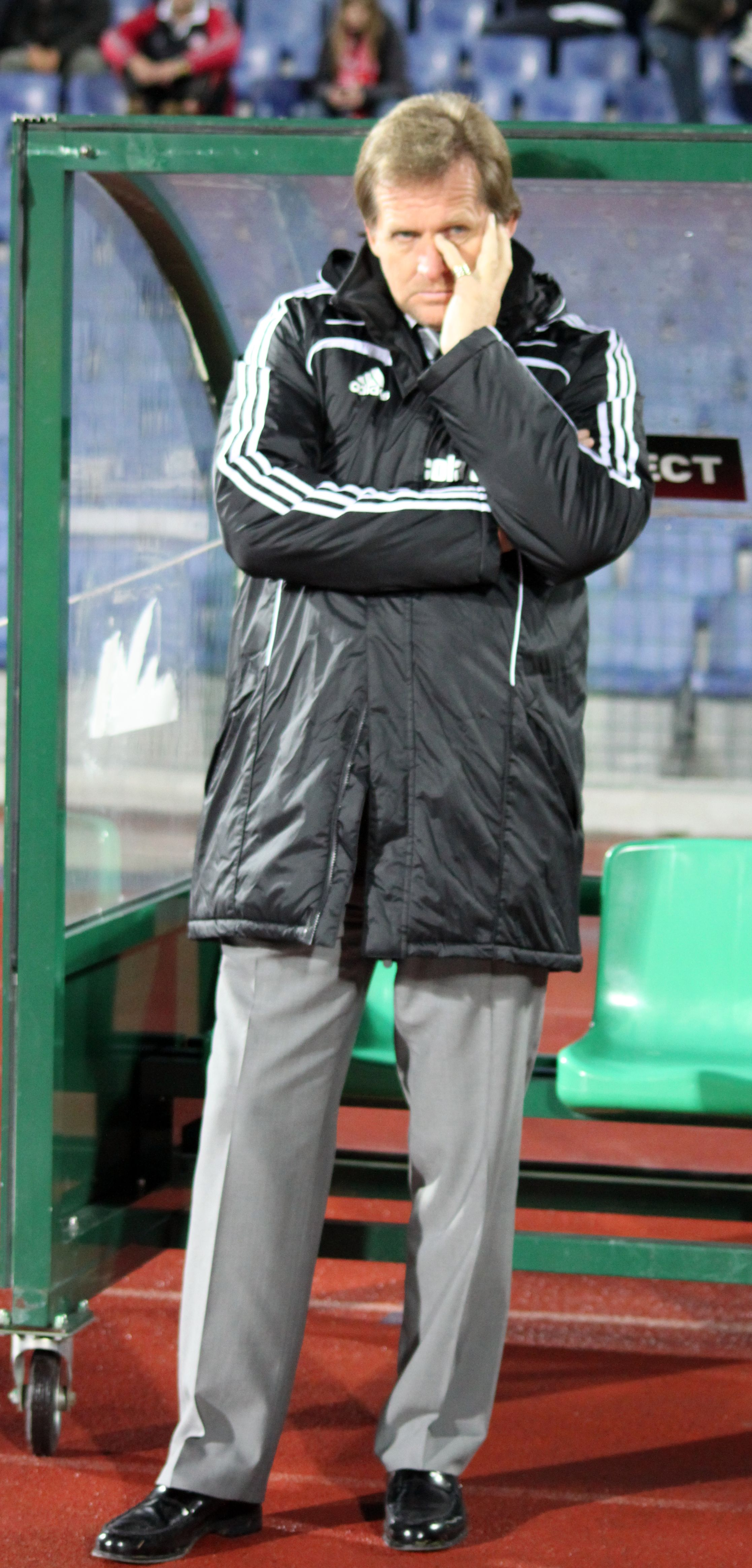
Schuster before a match of Beşiktaş against CSKA Sofia, 2010

On 10 June 2010, Turkish club Beşiktaş announced that Schuster had agreed to become the club's new coach on a two-year contract. Among his first signings for the club were Portuguese winger Ricardo Quaresma, Roberto Hilbert and former Real midfielder Guti, who was coached by Schuster at Madrid. Later, he bolstered the squad with three additional Portuguese stars Simão Sabrosa, Hugo Almeida and Manuel Fernandes. Schuster resigned on 15 March 2011 from Beşiktaş following a series of poor results. His tenure was marked by notable media interactions, including walking out of press conferences. He was criticised by the Turkish media for trying to implement a reckless attacking style of play.

=== Málaga ===
Schuster became head coach at Málaga on 12 June 2013. In May 2014, his contract was terminated after he failed to achieve a top-half position in the league.

=== Dalian Yifang ===
On 19 March 2018, the Chinese Super League team Dalian Yifang officially appointed Schuster as the coach. He was replaced by Choi Kang-hee in 2019.

== Personal life ==
During his time as a player, Schuster and his wife, Gaby, were celebrities in Germany. Gaby was publicly known for her outspoken nature, especially during her time managing Schuster's career. During the Schusters' stay in Spain, she was also notorious for her often public comments directed towards FC Barcelona coach Udo Lattek and national coach Jupp Derwall when her husband played for them. The couple have four children. In 2008, Schuster separated from Gaby Schuster. In 2012, after his divorce, he married Elena Blasco, a Spanish lawyer.

In 2026, he participated in the Antena 3 television show Mask Singer: Adivina quién canta, under the mask of Semáforo (Traffic Light).

== Career statistics ==
=== Club ===
Appearances and goals by club, season and competition
Club	Season	League			National cup (Note: Includes DFB-Pokal, Copa del Rey)		League cup (Note: Includes Copa de la Liga)		Continental		Other		Total	
Club	Season	Division	Apps	Goals	Apps	Goals	Apps	Goals	Apps	Goals	Apps	Goals	Apps	Goals
1. FC Köln	1978–79	Bundesliga	24	1	2	0	–		5	0	–		31	1
1. FC Köln	1979–80	Bundesliga	32	9	8	4	–		0	0	–		40	13
1. FC Köln	1980–81	Bundesliga	5	0	0	0	–				–		5	0
1. FC Köln	Total		61	10	10	4	0	0	5	0	0	0	76	14
Barcelona	1980–81	La Liga	23	11	5	0	–		0	0	–		28	11
Barcelona	1981–82	La Liga	13	8	0	0	–		4 (Note: Appearances in UEFA Cup)	2	–		17	10
Barcelona	1982–83	La Liga	28	7	6	1	6	1	5 (Note: Appearances in European Cup Winners' Cup)	5	2 (Note: Appearances in European Super Cup)	0	47	14
Barcelona	1983–84	La Liga	22	7	2	1	1	1	4	1	–		29	10
Barcelona	1984–85	La Liga	32	11	7	7	1	0	2	1	–		42	19
Barcelona	1985–86	La Liga	22	10	3	1	0	0	6 (Note: Appearances in European Cup)	1	1 (Note: Appearance in Supercopa de España)	0	32	12
Barcelona	1986–87	La Liga	0	0	0	0	–		0	0	–		0	0
Barcelona	1987–88	La Liga	30	9	8	3	–		8	1	–		46	13
Barcelona	Total		170	63	31	13	8	2	29	11	3	0	241	89
Real Madrid	1988–89	La Liga	33	7	9	3	–		8	0	2	0	52	10
Real Madrid	1989–90	La Liga	28	6	6	0	–		2	0	–		36	6
Real Madrid	Total		61	13	15	3	0	0	10	0	2	0	88	16
Atlético Madrid	1990–91	La Liga	29	4	7	1	–		0	0	–		36	5
Atlético Madrid	1991–92	La Liga	34	6	6	2	–		6	4	–		46	12
Atlético Madrid	1992–93	La Liga	22	1	2	0	–		6	0	–		30	1
Atlético Madrid	Total		85	11	15	3	0	0	12	4	0	0	112	18
Bayer Leverkusen	1993–94	Bundesliga	28	5	4	0	–		1	1	1 (Note: Appearance in DFB-Supercup)	0	34	6
Bayer Leverkusen	1994–95	Bundesliga	23	2	2	1	–		9	2	–		34	5
Bayer Leverkusen	1995–96	Bundesliga	8	1	3	0	–		4	0	–		15	1
Bayer Leverkusen	Total		59	8	9	1	0	0	14	3	1	0	83	12
Universidad Nacional	1996–97	Primera División	9	0									9	0
Career total			445	105	80	24	8	2	70	18	6	0	609	149

=== International ===
Appearances and goals by national team and year
National team	Year	Apps	Goals
West Germany	1979	5	0
West Germany	1980	6	1
West Germany	1981	3	2
West Germany	1982	1	0
West Germany	1983	4	1
West Germany	1984	2	0
Total		21	4

=== Managerial ===
As of 20 October 2018

Team	From	To	Record								
Team	From	To	G	W	D	L	GF	GA	GD	Win %	Ref.
Fortuna Köln	1 July 1997	30 June 1998	35	11	13	11	55	59	−4	31.43	
1. FC Köln	1 July 1998	30 June 1999	35	12	9	14	46	54	−8	34.29	
Xerez	26 June 2001	30 June 2003	89	38	22	29	102	101	+1	42.70	
Shakhtar Donetsk	1 July 2003	5 May 2004	43	30	6	7	82	28	+54	69.77	
Levante	1 July 2004	1 May 2005	36	9	9	18	37	52	−15	25.00	
Getafe	20 June 2005	9 July 2007	89	35	21	33	119	101	+18	39.33	
Real Madrid	9 July 2007	9 December 2008	75	44	9	22	157	100	+57	58.67	
Beşiktaş	10 June 2010	15 March 2011	45	24	8	13	80	50	+30	53.33	
Málaga	12 June 2013	16 May 2014	40	12	11	17	43	50	−7	30.00	
Dalian Yifang	19 March 2018	10 February 2019	29	13	5	11	41	40	+1	44.83	
Total			516	228	113	175	762	636	+126	44.19	—

== Honours ==
=== Player ===
Barcelona

- La Liga: 1984–85
- Copa del Rey: 1980–81, 1982–83, 1987–88
- European Cup Winners' Cup: 1981–82
- Copa de la Liga: 1983
- European Cup runner-up: 1985–86

Real Madrid

- La Liga: 1988–89, 1989–90
- Copa del Rey: 1988–89
- Supercopa de España: 1989

Atlético Madrid

- Copa del Rey: 1990–91, 1991–92

West Germany

- UEFA European Championship: 1980

Individual

- UEFA European Championship Team of the Tournament: 1980
- Ballon d'Or runner-up: 1980; third place: 1981, 1985
- Sport Ideal European XI: 1980
- Guerin Sportivo All-Star Team: 1980, 1981
- La Liga: Don Balón Award for Best Foreign Player: 1985, 1991
- kicker Bundesliga Team of the Season: 1993–94
- Goal of the Year (Germany): 1994

=== Manager ===
Getafe

- Copa del Rey runner-up: 2006–07

Real Madrid

- La Liga: 2007–08
- Supercopa de España: 2008

Individual

- La Liga: Miguel Muñoz Trophy for Best Coach of the Year: 2006
