= Martín Domínguez =

Spanish footballer

Personal information
- Full name: José Antonio Martín Domínguez
- Date of birth: 4 April 1964 (age 62)
- Place of birth: Sant Joan Despí, Spain
- Height: 1.78 m (5 ft 10 in)
- Position: Midfielder

Youth career
- Barcelona

Senior career*
Years	Team	Apps	(Gls)
1984–1986	Barcelona C	64	(22)
1986–1988	Barcelona B	67	(23)
1984	Barcelona	1	(1)
1988–1989	Figueres	36	(7)
1989–1994	Osasuna	137	(11)
1994–1996	Marbella	69	(3)
1996–1999	Gavà	36	(0)
Total		410	(67)

International career
1991	Spain	3	(0)
- * Club domestic league appearances and goals

José Antonio Martín Domínguez (born 4 April 1964) is a Spanish former professional footballer who played as a left midfielder.

== Club career ==
Born in Sant Joan Despí, Barcelona, Catalonia, Domínguez was a product of FC Barcelona's youth system, but only appeared once with the first team, good enough for a 1985 championship medal. For four years, he was mainly registered with the third side and the reserves, scoring 15 Segunda División goals in 1987–88 for the latter, a record that was only surpassed nearly 30 years later by Jonathan Soriano. Ahead of the following season, he signed for neighbours UE Figueres of the same league.

After only one year, Domínguez returned immediately to La Liga, joining CA Osasuna. In his first three seasons, he experienced a fourth place in 1990–91, a third-round run in the subsequent edition of the UEFA Cup and 104 league games. However, he featured sparingly in his last two years, and the Navarrese were also relegated at the end of the 1993–94 campaign.

Domínguez retired at the age of 35 after two seasons with CA Marbella and three with lowly CF Gavà, the former club in the second tier.

== International career ==
Domínguez appeared in three 1991 friendlies for Spain, against Portugal (his debut, on 16 January), Hungary and Romania.

== Honours ==
Barcelona

- La Liga: 1984–85
