= Luis Saavedra =

Spanish footballer

Personal information
- Full name: Luis Saavedra Mora
- Date of birth: 22 June 1935
- Place of birth: San Cristóbal de La Laguna, Tenerife, Spain
- Date of death: 7 December 2013 (aged 78)
- Place of death: Spain
- Positions: Left-back; midfielder

Senior career*
Years	Team	Apps	(Gls)
1956-1957	Tenerife	2	(0)
- * Club domestic league appearances and goals

Luis Saavedra Mora (22 June 1935 – 7 December 2013) was a Spanish footballer who primarily played as a left-back and midfielder.

Saavedra died on 7 December 2013, aged 78.
