= Mundialito de Clubs =

The Mundialito de Clubs, officially Cup Super Clubs or Coppa Supermondiale Clubs, was an unofficial summer association football friendly tournament that took place in Milan, Italy from 1981 to 1987 every two years, except for 1985 where it was played in Cesena, organized by the TV Channel 5. The tournament was played in San Siro. The first two editions were named Coppa Super Clubs, and the last was the name of the Coppa delle Stelle. In 1987 Paris Saint-Germain F.C. replaced Olympique de Marseille, F.C. Porto replaced FC Dynamo Kyiv and F.C. Barcelona replaced Juventus FC

The tournament was contested by 5 teams, the teams played 4 round-robin 90-minute matches. Each team allowed to use two players not under contract with the club. Only in the 1985 edition was attended by four clubs.

== Finals ==
Year	Champion	Runners-Up	Third place	Fourth place	Fifth place
1981	(Italy) F.C. Internazionale Milano	(Brazil) Santos FC	(Italy) A.C. Milan	(Netherlands) Feyenoord	(Uruguay) C.A. Peñarol
1983	(Italy) Juventus FC	(Brazil) Flamengo	(Uruguay) C.A. Peñarol	(Italy) A.C. Milan	(Italy) F.C. Internazionale Milano
1985	(Uruguay) C.A. Peñarol	(Argentina) Independiente	(Italy) F.C. Internazionale Milano	(Brazil) Santos FC	-
1987	(Italy) A.C. Milan	(Portugal) F.C. Porto	(Italy) F.C. Internazionale Milano	(Spain) F.C. Barcelona	(France) Paris Saint-Germain F.C.
