= Ángel Pedraza =

Spanish footballer (1962–2011)

Personal information
- Full name: Ángel Pedraza Lamilla
- Date of birth: 4 October 1962
- Place of birth: La Rinconada, Spain
- Date of death: 8 January 2011 (aged 48)
- Place of death: Barcelona, Spain
- Height: 1.69 m (5 ft 7 in)
- Positions: Full-back; midfielder

Youth career
- Barcelona

Senior career*
Years	Team	Apps	(Gls)
1982–1985	Barcelona B	67	(13)
1982–1983	→ Villarreal (loan)		
1985–1988	Barcelona	45	(4)
1988–1995	Mallorca	229	(3)
1995–1997	Sóller		

International career
1980–1981	Spain U18	9	(1)

Managerial career
- 2004–2005: Espanyol B
- 2005–2006: Benidorm
- 2006–2007: Villarreal B
- 2007–2008: Iraklis
- 2009: Panserraikos
- 2009–2010: Atlético Baleares
- 2010: Hospitalet
- * Club domestic league appearances and goals

Ángel Pedraza Lamilla (4 October 1962 – 8 January 2011) was a Spanish professional footballer who played as a full-back and a central midfielder. He was also a manager.

== Playing career ==
Born in La Rinconada, Andalusia, Pedraza finished his development at FC Barcelona, and spent two seasons with the reserves in the Segunda División. On 16 September 1980, László Kubala granted him the opportunity to play one UEFA Cup match against Sliema Wanderers F.C. in Malta, and he became the first La Masia youth graduate ever to appear for the main squad.

In January 1986, with Terry Venables as a coach, Pedraza made his La Liga debut with the first team, where he remained a further three years, being mostly used as a backup. In the 1986 European Cup final, he was one of four Barça players – the others were José Ramón Alexanko, Pichi Alonso and Marcos – to have their penalty shootout attempts saved by FC Steaua București goalkeeper Helmut Duckadam, as the Catalans lost the decisive match in Seville (0–0 after 120 minutes).

Pedraza signed for RCD Mallorca in the 1988 off-season, with the Balearic Islands club being coached by a young Lorenzo Serra Ferrer, who relocated the player from central midfielder to full-back. In his first season, he was an essential defensive player (3,241 minutes, one goal) as they returned to La Liga, and also reached the Copa del Rey final in 1991; in six of his seven years with the team, he did not appear in less than 30 league games, and retired from football in 1997 at the age of 35 following a two-year stint with amateurs CF Sóller, also in Mallorca.

== Coaching career ==
Immediately after retiring, Pedraza started managing, spending five years with several youth sides at former club Barcelona. In 2002, he moved across the city and coached RCD Espanyol's juniors, joining the B team afterwards.

Pedraza then spent three seasons in the Segunda División B, first with Benidorm CF then Villarreal CF B. After one year in Greece, split between two teams, he returned to his country and took charge of amateurs CD Atlético Baleares, helping them to promote from Tercera División as champions.

In July 2010, despite being already suffering from cancer, Pedraza agreed to take over at CE L'Hospitalet in the third tier. He was however relieved of his duties after only three months. On 8 January 2011, aged only 48, he died from the illness in Barcelona.

== Personal life ==
Pedraza's son, Marc, was also a professional footballer. A midfielder, he was brought up in Espanyol's youth system, being coached by his father at Hospitalet, with the manager being dismissed precisely after the player's debut.

== Honours ==
=== Player ===
Barcelona

- Copa del Rey: 1987–88
- Copa de la Liga: 1986
- European Cup runner-up: 1985–86

Mallorca

- Copa del Rey runner-up: 1990–91

=== Manager ===
Atlético Baleares

- Tercera División: 2009–10
