= Ramón Calderé =

Spanish footballer (born 1959)

Personal information
- Full name: Ramón María Calderé del Rey
- Date of birth: 16 January 1959 (age 67)
- Place of birth: Vila-rodona, Spain
- Height: 1.77 m (5 ft 10 in)
- Position: Midfielder

Youth career
- 1972–1977: Barcelona

Senior career*
Years	Team	Apps	(Gls)
1977–1984	Barcelona B	117	(31)
1979–1980	→ Alcalá (loan)		
1980	→ Valladolid (loan)	3	(0)
1981	→ Alcalá (loan)	15	(2)
1984–1988	Barcelona	110	(15)
1988–1990	Betis	47	(1)
1990–1993	Sant Andreu	86	(11)
Total		378	(60)

International career
1984–1986	Spain U21	3	(1)
1985–1988	Spain	18	(7)

Managerial career
- 1993–1995: Santboià (assistant)
- 1995–1996: Europa (assistant)
- 1996–1997: Júpiter (assistant)
- 1997–1998: Premià
- 1998–2000: Cornellà
- 2000–2001: Gavà
- 2002: Castelldefels
- 2002–2005: Badalona
- 2005–2006: Ceuta
- 2006–2007: Premià
- 2007–2009: Reus
- 2009–2011: Teruel
- 2011–2012: Palencia
- 2012–2014: Burgos
- 2014–2015: Castellón
- 2016–2017: Olot
- 2017: Sint-Truiden (assistant)
- 2017–2018: Salmantino
- 2018–2019: Badalona
- 2020: Santboià
- 2021: Montañesa
- 2021–2022: Tàrrega
- 2022: Jarabacoa
- 2023: Vilafranca
- 2023–2024: Santa Coloma
- * Club domestic league appearances and goals

Ramón María Calderé del Rey (born 16 January 1959) is a Spanish former professional footballer who played as a midfielder, currently a manager.

An all-around midfield unit, he played mainly for Barcelona, appearing in 157 competitive games over four La Liga seasons. In the Spanish top division, he also represented Valladolid and Betis.

A Spanish international in the second part of the 80s, Calderé represented the country at the 1986 World Cup and Euro 1988. He went on to have an extensive career as a coach following his retirement, but exclusively in the lower leagues.

== Club career ==
Born in Vila-rodona, Tarragona, Catalonia, Calderé was a product of local club FC Barcelona's youth system, having spent several seasons with their reserves. In an unassuming loan spell, he made his La Liga debut with Real Valladolid in 1980–81.

At already 25, Calderé was promoted to the first team, helping them win the league title in his first season even though he was not first choice. In summer 1988, he signed for fellow top-flight Real Betis against his wishes, being relegated in his debut campaign.

Calderé retired in 1993 at the age of 34, with lowly UE Sant Andreu also in his province of birth, and subsequently took up coaching, mainly with modest teams in the region: CE Premià – twice – UE Cornellà, CF Gavà, UE Castelldefels, CF Badalona, AD Ceuta, CF Reus Deportiu, CD Teruel, CF Palencia and Burgos CF. In June 2008, whilst a manager of Reus, he was arrested following an alleged assault on a civil guard during a match at Sangonera Atlético CF.

Other than working in his country's lower leagues, Calderé also had a brief assistant spell at Sint-Truidense V.V. in the Belgian Pro League, under his compatriot Tintín Márquez.

== International career ==
Calderé earned 18 caps and scored seven goals for Spain, and played in the 1986 FIFA World Cup where he scored twice in a 3–0 group stage win over Algeria. Having made his debut on 30 April 1985 in a 1986 World Cup qualifier against Wales in Wrexham (3–0 loss), he was also picked for UEFA Euro 1988's squad, but was not used.

Calderé was used as an overaged player by the under-21 side, helping them win the 1986 European Championships even though he did not appear in the finals due to injury.

=== 1986 World Cup ===
During the 1986 World Cup in Mexico, Calderé suffered from a case of travelers' diarrhea, and was prescribed antibiotics by the national team physician. After the win against Northern Ireland he was summoned for a doping test, which came out positive.

Calderé, however, was not sanctioned, as the medical staff argued successfully the medication was administered to fight the condition, lest a severe risk of dehydration. He scored twice against Algeria in the following match.

== Managerial statistics ==
As of 20 January 2019

Managerial record by team and tenure
Team	Nat	From	To	Record								Ref
Team	Nat	From	To	G	W	D	L	GF	GA	GD	Win %	Ref
Premià	(Spain)	1 July 1997	30 June 1998	38	13	8	17	50	50	+0	34.21	
Cornellà	(Spain)	1 July 1998	30 June 2000	82	45	21	16	151	76	+75	54.88	
Gavà	(Spain)	1 July 2000	30 June 2001	44	23	13	8	83	45	+38	52.27	
Castelldefels	(Spain)	1 January 2002	30 June 2002	20	7	9	4	33	27	+6	35.00	
Badalona	(Spain)	1 July 2002	30 June 2005	141	69	40	32	209	130	+79	48.94	
Ceuta	(Spain)	1 July 2005	13 March 2006	30	5	18	7	22	23	−1	16.67	
Premià	(Spain)	1 July 2006	30 June 2007	38	11	10	17	40	58	−18	28.95	
Reus	(Spain)	1 July 2007	30 June 2009	91	47	25	19	155	86	+69	51.65	
Teruel	(Spain)	1 July 2009	28 May 2011	80	43	20	17	128	64	+64	53.75	
Palencia	(Spain)	1 July 2011	23 June 2012	43	13	11	19	36	52	−16	30.23	
Burgos	(Spain)	23 June 2012	13 June 2014	85	47	15	23	135	72	+63	55.29	
Castellón	(Spain)	30 October 2014	19 October 2015	55	24	15	16	75	51	+24	43.64	—
Olot	(Spain)	1 June 2016	3 June 2017	40	25	9	6	75	39	+36	62.50	
Salmantino	(Spain)	16 October 2017	9 February 2018	15	6	4	5	21	15	+6	40.00	—
Badalona	(Spain)	9 July 2018	22 January 2019	22	5	7	10	19	25	−6	22.73	
Total				824	383	225	216	1,232	813	+419	46.48	—

== Honours ==
=== Player ===
Barcelona

- La Liga: 1984–85
- Copa del Rey: 1987–88

Sant Andreu

- Segunda División B: 1991–92

Spain U21

- UEFA European Under-21 Championship: 1986

=== Manager ===
Gavà

- Tercera División: 2000–01

Teruel

- Tercera División: 2009–10

Castellón

- Tercera División: 2014–15

Santa Coloma

- Primera Divisió: 2023–24
- Copa Constitució: 2024
