= Salva (footballer, born 1961) =

Spanish footballer

Personal information
- Full name: Salvador García Puig
- Date of birth: 4 March 1961 (age 65)
- Place of birth: Sant Adrià, Spain
- Height: 1.81 m (5 ft 11 in)
- Position: Defender

Youth career
- Sant Gabriel
- Barcelona

Senior career*
Years	Team	Apps	(Gls)
1980–1982	Barcelona B	57	(1)
1982–1984	Zaragoza	60	(0)
1984–1989	Barcelona	22	(0)
1985–1986	→ Hércules (loan)	16	(1)
1989–1992	Logroñés	58	(0)
Total		213	(2)

International career
1983–1984	Spain	6	(0)
Medal record
Representing Spain
UEFA European Championship
Runner-up	1984 France
- * Club domestic league appearances and goals

Salvador García Puig (born 4 March 1961), known as Salva, is a Spanish former professional footballer who played as a defender.

== Club career ==
Born in Sant Adrià de Besòs, Barcelona, Catalonia, Salva finished his development at FC Barcelona. In his professional career, he played for FC Barcelona Atlètic, Real Zaragoza, Hércules CF, Barcelona (where he was solely a backup) and CD Logroñés, retiring at the age of 31 with 156 La Liga matches to his credit in ten seasons.

Salva's best output for the Camp Nou-based club consisted of 17 games in the 1987–88 campaign, which ended with victory in the Copa del Rey.

== International career ==
Salva earned six caps for Spain in less than one year. His debut came on 5 October 1983 in a friendly with France in Paris, being included in the UEFA Euro 1984 squad and making three appearances for the runners-up, including the final.

== Honours ==
Barcelona

- Copa del Rey: 1987–88
- Copa de la Liga: 1986

Spain

- UEFA European Championship runner-up: 1984
