= Pichi Alonso =

Spanish footballer and manager

Personal information
- Full name: Àngel Alonso Herrera
- Date of birth: 17 December 1954 (age 71)
- Place of birth: Benicarló, Spain
- Height: 1.78 m (5 ft 10 in)
- Position: Striker

Youth career
- Benicarló

Senior career*
Years	Team	Apps	(Gls)
1975–1977	Castellón	57	(20)
1977–1982	Zaragoza	159	(92)
1982–1986	Barcelona	51	(12)
1986–1989	Español	79	(25)
Total		346	(149)

International career
1979	Spain U23	5	(1)
1981	Spain B	1	(2)
1978–1980	Spain	3	(0)

Managerial career
- 1992–1993: Figueres
- 1995–2005: Catalonia
- 2006: Metalurh Donetsk
- * Club domestic league appearances and goals

Àngel "Pichi" Alonso Herrera (born 17 December 1954) is a Spanish former professional football striker and manager.

A player with a prolific scoring rate, though he never won the Pichichi Trophy, he represented, amongst others, both Barcelona major clubs during his career. He amassed La Liga totals of 261 games and 107 goals over 11 seasons, and won four titles with FC Barcelona.

== Playing career ==
Born in Benicarló, Castellón, Valencian Community, Alonso made his professional debut with local club CD Castellón in the Segunda División, in 1975. He signed for Real Zaragoza two years later, playing 33 La Liga matches in every season he remained there and never netting less than 15 goals; in his debut campaign, he scored five in an 8–1 rout of RCD Español.

For the 1982–83 campaign, Alonso moved to FC Barcelona, being used frequently in his first year but losing his importance after the purchase of Scotland's Steve Archibald, and never regaining it again. Still, he scored three goals against IFK Göteborg in the 1986 European Cup semi-finals, allowing the Catalans to reach the final of the competition against FC Steaua București in Seville, where he came on as a substitute in extra time, in an eventual penalty shootout loss; he was one of four players that had his attempt saved by opposing goalkeeper Helmut Duckadam.

Alonso regained his scoring prowess at Barça neighbours Espanyol, helping the side to finish third in his first season with 17 goals. In 1987–88 another penalty shootout defeat occurred, now in the UEFA Cup against Bayer 04 Leverkusen. He retired the following year at the age of 35, having won three caps for the Spain national team – his debut came on 21 December 1978 in a 1–0 friendly loss with Italy, in Rome.

== Coaching career ==
Alonso started his manager career as assistant to his former Barcelona teammate Víctor Muñoz at RCD Mallorca. He then coached the autonomous team of Catalonia for several years, while also working as a pundit for Televisió de Catalunya.

In 2006, Alonso had a brief managerial spell at Ukraine's FC Metalurh Donetsk.

== Honours ==
Zaragoza

- Segunda División: 1977–78

Barcelona

- La Liga: 1984–85
- Copa del Rey: 1982–83
- Supercopa de España: 1983
- Copa de la Liga: 1983
- European Cup runner-up: 1985–86

Español

- UEFA Cup runner-up: 1987–88
