= Gerardo Miranda =

Spanish footballer (born 1956)

Gerardo
Personal information
- Full name: Gerardo Miranda Concepción
- Date of birth: 16 November 1956 (age 69)
- Place of birth: Nouakchott, French West Africa
- Height: 1.78 m (5 ft 10 in)
- Position: Right-back

Youth career
- Ciudad Alta
- 1966–1972: San Bernardo
- 1972–1974: Las Palmas

Senior career*
Years	Team	Apps	(Gls)
1974–1976	Las Palmas B		
1976–1981	Las Palmas	101	(4)
1981–1988	Barcelona	144	(5)
1988–1990	Las Palmas	71	(7)
Total		316	(16)

International career
1979	Spain U23	2	(0)
1979	Spain amateur	7	(0)
1981	Spain B	3	(0)
1981–1985	Spain	9	(0)
- * Club domestic league appearances and goals

Gerardo Miranda Concepción (born 16 November 1956), known simply as Gerardo, is a Spanish former professional footballer who played as a right-back.

== Club career ==
Gerardo was born in Nouakchott, French West Africa, to Spanish parents working there. He played for UD Las Palmas and FC Barcelona during his career, retiring in 1990 at his first club in the Segunda División; he started out as a winger under manager Roque Olsen, being reconverted by Miguel Muñoz.

Gerardo's best season came in 1984–85, when he appeared in 28 matches and scored three goals as the Catalans won the La Liga title. When his team conquered the 1981–82 edition of the UEFA Cup Winners' Cup, he contributed five appearances.

== International career ==
Gerardo earned nine caps with the Spain national team, but was never selected for any major tournament. His debut was on 20 June 1981, in a 2–0 friendly loss against Portugal where he was deployed as sweeper.

== Honours ==
Barcelona

- La Liga: 1984–85
- Copa del Rey: 1982–83, 1987–88
- Copa de la Liga: 1983, 1986
- European Cup Winners' Cup: 1981–82

== See also ==
- List of Spain international footballers born outside Spain
