= Paco Clos =

Spanish retired professional footballer

Personal information
- Full name: Francisco Javier Clos Orozco
- Date of birth: 8 August 1960 (age 66)
- Place of birth: Mataró, Spain
- Height: 1.82 m (6 ft 0 in)
- Position: Striker

Youth career
- Juventus Mataró
- 1978–1980: Barcelona

Senior career*
Years	Team	Apps	(Gls)
1980–1983	Barcelona B	97	(27)
1981	→ Sabadell (loan)	2	(0)
1982–1988	Barcelona	62	(9)
1988–1991	Murcia	53	(6)
1991–1992	Orihuela Deportiva	32	(4)
1992–1994	Palafrugell		
1994	Mataró		

International career
1985	Spain U21	1	(0)
1985	Spain	3	(1)

Managerial career
- 1994–1995: Mataronesa
- 1995–1996: Mataró (assistant)
- 1997–1999: Mataronesa
- 1999–2000: Hospitalet (assistant)
- 2000–2001: Badalona
- 2002–2003: Vilassar Mar (assistant)
- 2003–2004: Atlético Baleares
- 2005–2006: Vilassar Mar
- 2006–2007: Rubí (assistant)
- 2007–2008: Terrassa (assistant)
- 2009–2011: Santboià (assistant)
- 2011: Santboià
- * Club domestic league appearances and goals

Francisco "Paco" Javier Clos Orozco (born 8 August 1960) is a Spanish former professional footballer who played as a striker. He later worked as a manager.

== Club career ==
Born in Mataró, Barcelona, Catalonia, Clos spent his career mainly in lowly teams in his native region, although he did manage to compete in seven La Liga seasons: six for FC Barcelona, mostly as a backup, and one for Real Murcia CF (he also appeared with the latter club in the Segunda División, in the 1989–90 and 1990–91 campaigns).

Clos had a lengthy spell as manager after his retirement in 1994, with all the sides also hailing from his region of birth, mostly in amateur football.

== International career ==
During his stint with Barça, Clos earned three caps for Spain, all in 1985, but never took part in any major international tournament. On 27 February 1985, however, he scored the game's only goal in a 1986 FIFA World Cup qualifier against Scotland, which later proved decisive for Miguel Muñoz side's qualification (eight group points to seven).

=== International goals ===
#	Date	Venue	Opponent	Score	Result	Competition
1.	27 February 1985	Sánchez Pizjuán, Seville, Spain	Scotland	1–0	1–0	1986 World Cup qualification

== Honours ==
Barcelona

- La Liga: 1984–85
- Copa del Rey: 1982–83, 1987–88
- Supercopa de España: 1983
- Copa de la Liga: 1986
