= Urbano Ortega =

Spanish footballer and manager

Urbano
Personal information
- Full name: Urbano Ortega Cuadros
- Date of birth: 22 December 1961 (age 64)
- Place of birth: Beas de Segura, Spain
- Height: 1.83 m (6 ft 0 in)
- Position: Midfielder

Youth career
- Jaén

Senior career*
Years	Team	Apps	(Gls)
1979–1980	Jaén	15	(1)
1980–1982	Español	54	(5)
1982–1991	Barcelona	123	(7)
1991–1993	Español	59	(3)
1993–1994	Lleida	36	(1)
1994–1996	Mérida	59	(3)
1996–1997	Málaga	25	(0)
Total		371	(20)

International career
1979–1980	Spain U18	11	(3)
1980–1983	Spain U21	13	(2)
1982–1988	Spain U23	6	(0)
1980	Spain amateur	3	(0)

Managerial career
- 2003–2004: Xerez (assistant)
- 2004–2005: Córdoba (assistant)
- 2005–2006: Dinamo București (assistant)
- 2007: Lleida (assistant)
- 2007–2008: Baza
- * Club domestic league appearances and goals

Urbano Ortega Cuadros (born 22 December 1961), known simply as Urbano, is a Spanish former professional footballer who played as a midfielder.

Over the course of 16 La Liga seasons (18 for his career), he amassed totals of 301 games and 16 goals, mainly for Espanyol and Barcelona.

== Club career ==
Urbano was born in Beas de Segura, Province of Jaén. After starting out at Real Jaén as a forward and RCD Español, he signed with Catalonia neighbours FC Barcelona in 1982. He only started in two of his nine seasons during his Camp Nou spell, being mainly used as a backup.

Subsequently, Urbano returned to Español for two more seasons, with top-flight relegation in 1992–93. He closed out his professional career in 1997 following spells at modest UE Lleida (one year) and CP Mérida (two), with two additional campaigns in the top division, one with each team.

Urbano began coaching in 2003, assisting former Barça teammate Esteban Vigo at numerous clubs, including Romania's FC Dinamo București. His first head coach experience arrived in 2007–08 in Segunda División B, with CD Baza. He resigned in June 2008, as the side dropped down a tier.

After working as a scout for Barcelona and Villarreal CF, Urbano returned to another former club, Espanyol (as they were now known), in July 2009, as a sporting director.

== International career ==
Urbano never earned a senior cap for Spain, but was a regular for its under-21 team, also competing at the 1980 Summer Olympics.

== Honours ==
Barcelona

- La Liga: 1990–91
- Copa del Rey: 1982–83, 1987–88, 1989–90
- Supercopa de España: 1983
- Copa de la Liga: 1986
- UEFA Cup Winners' Cup: 1988–89
