= Josep Moratalla =

Spanish footballer and coach

Personal information
- Full name: Josep Moratalla Claramunt
- Date of birth: 1 October 1958 (age 68)
- Place of birth: Esparreguera, Spain
- Height: 1.83 m (6 ft 0 in)
- Position: Centre-back

Youth career
- 1972–1977: Barcelona

Senior career*
Years	Team	Apps	(Gls)
1977–1978	Barcelona C		
1978–1982	Barcelona B	66	(2)
1979–1980	→ Deportivo La Coruña (loan)	13	(0)
1982–1988	Barcelona	104	(1)
1988–1991	Figueres	43	(3)
Total		226	(6)

Managerial career
- 1992–1993: Santboià
- 1993–1995: Santboià
- 1995–1997: Europa
- 2000–2001: Premià
- 2001–2003: Girona
- 2004–2006: Europa
- * Club domestic league appearances and goals

Josep Moratalla Claramunt (born 1 October 1958) is a Spanish former footballer who played as a central defender, and a manager.

== Playing career ==
Born in Esparreguera, Barcelona, Catalonia, Moratalla signed for FC Barcelona in 1972 at the age of 13. He played seven seasons with the national powerhouse (also being loaned to Deportivo de La Coruña in the Segunda División as he was due to perform his compulsory military service in Galicia), but only appeared a total of 19 times in La Liga in his first four years, barred by José Ramón Alexanko and Migueli– for instance, when the Blaugrana won the national championship in the 1984–85 campaign, he only totalled 104 minutes in two matches; he made his league debut for the club on 28 February 1982, coming on as a late substitute in a 2–0 home win against Sevilla FC.

Even though used rarely in his beginnings, Moratalla started in the 1982 European Cup Winners' Cup final, a 2–1 victory over Standard Liège at the Camp Nou, Additionally, he was brought from the bench in the 1986 European Cup final, lost in a penalty shootout to FC Steaua București.

Moratalla played with Barcelona until 1988, being first choice in his final two years and adding the Copa del Rey to his trophy cabinet in his last. He retired from football aged 32 after three seasons in the second tier with another team in his native region, UE Figueres.

== Coaching career ==
Moratalla started working as a manager in 1992, and all of his clubs hailed from his region of birth and competed in the lower leagues. His first job was at FC Santboià, followed by CE Europa where he would have two separate spells.

Moratalla's only experience in the Segunda División B came during 2000–01 with CE Premià, where he ultimately did not possess the necessary requirements to coach at that level after failing his exam. The team eventually ranked in last position, and he went on to be in charge of Girona FC from Tercera División for two years.

Additionally, Moratalla acted as sporting president of Barcelona's Agrupació Barça Jugadors, who held several activities and events involving past players of the organization.

== Honours ==
Barcelona

- La Liga: 1984–85
- Copa del Rey: 1982–83, 1987–88; runner-up: 1983–84, 1985–86
- Copa de la Liga: 1986
- UEFA Cup Winners' Cup: 1981–82
- Supercopa de España runner-up: 1985
- European Cup runner-up: 1985–86
