= Manolo (footballer, born 1960) =

Spanish footballer

Personal information
- Full name: José Manuel Martínez Toral
- Date of birth: 29 October 1960 (age 66)
- Place of birth: Caravaca, Spain
- Height: 1.80 m (5 ft 11 in)
- Position: Defender

Youth career
- 1972–1973: PB Cinc Copes
- 1973–1978: Barcelona

Senior career*
Years	Team	Apps	(Gls)
1978–1980	Barcelona Atlètic	51	(1)
1979–1988	Barcelona	97	(0)
1988–1991	Murcia	75	(3)
1991–1992	Granada	31	(0)
1992–1993	Premià		
Total		254	(4)

International career
1978–1979	Spain U18	12	(0)
1979	Spain U19	2	(0)
1979–1980	Spain U20	5	(0)
1979–1982	Spain U21	10	(1)
1980	Spain U23	1	(0)
1980	Spain amateur	1	(0)
- * Club domestic league appearances and goals

José Manuel Martínez Toral, simply Manolo (born 29 October 1960 in Caravaca, Region of Murcia), is a Spanish retired footballer.

== Career ==
The defender played a single cap for the Spain national football team and played for the Spain national under-20 football team football team, the 1979 FIFA World Youth Championship in Japan.

== Honours ==
Barcelona

- UEFA Cup Winners' Cup: 1978–79, 1981–82
- Spanish League: 1984–85
- Spanish Cup: 1980–81, 1982–83, 1987–88
- Spanish Superup: 1983
- Spanish League Cup: 1982–83, 1985–86

== Personal life ==
His son José Manel (born 1992) is a soccer player for the VCU Rams men's soccer team and for National Premier Soccer League side RVA Football Club.
