= The Rest Is Science =

Science podcast hosted by Hannah Fry and Michael Stevens

- Podcast cover image featuring Michael Stevens (left) and Hannah Fry (right)
- Genre: Science
- Format: Audio / Video
- Language: English

Cast and voices
- Hosted by: Hannah Fry; Michael Stevens

Production
- Production: Goalhanger

Publication
- Original release: 25 November 2025

Related

YouTube information
- Channel: The Rest Is Science
- Years active: 2025−present
- Subscribers: 661 thousand
- Views: 150.90 million
- Last updated: 3 August 2026
- Website: therestis.com/science

The Rest Is Science (TRIS) is a podcast hosted by British mathematician and broadcaster Hannah Fry and American educator and entertainer Michael Stevens. Produced by the British podcast production company Goalhanger, its first episode premiered on 25 November 2025.

== Background and release ==
The Rest Is Science was launched by the podcast production company Goalhanger, which previously created history-, politics-, and entertainment-centered podcasts under The Rest Is branding. Following their previous podcasts' approach of casting high-profile hosts, Goalhanger pegged Hannah Fry and Michael Stevens as the hosts of the podcast. Both known for their science communication online, Fry is a British mathematician and professor of the Public Understanding of Mathematics at the University of Cambridge; meanwhile, Stevens is an American educator and YouTuber, best known for creating Vsauce.

Goalhanger announced The Rest Is Science on 18 November 2025, with the first episode released a week later on 25 November. The first episode covered topics centered around water, such as whether it is actually wet, how its minerals shape its taste, and the planet's supply of drinkable water, among others. TRIS marked the first time Goalhanger focused on a video-first approach for a podcast, though it is released as both an audio and video podcast, with the former version on several platforms and the latter being hosted on YouTube. Short-form clips from the podcast are uploaded on YouTube Shorts and TikTok.

The podcast is released on a twice-weekly schedule, with new episodes each Tuesday and Thursday. Tuesday episodes cover a single topic, with a deep dive into the science and history of it; Thursday episodes, dubbed "Field Notes" feature a "curious object begin a journey through the ideas it represents". The first Field Notes episode featured Stevens showing Fry the Arecibo interstellar radio message. The podcast also releases monthly episodes in partnership with Cancer Research UK, with Fry and Stevens covering various insights about cancer. For example, in the April 2026 Cancer Research UK-branded episode Fry and Stevens discussed the rapid evolution of cancer.

TRIS won the Webby Award for Best New Podcast (Entertainment & Culture, Features) in 2026.

== Reception ==
Miranda Sawyer, writing for The Observer, positively reviewed the podcast's first episode. She stated that the podcast is "lighter in tone" than its Rest Is stablemates, "though just as informative". Opining on the chemistry between Fry and Stevens, Sawyer wrote that the two are "immensely likeable and spark nicely".

Patricia Nicol of The Times was more critical of the podcast. She wrote that while "there was certainly charm and cleverness, and a smattering of intriguing facts, such as how bone can be analysed to discover 'a geological postcode of where someone has consumed water'", the podcast's launch episodes felt a "little too much like eavesdropping on a couple of nervous first-year Stem students showing off to one another in the union bar". Nicol further criticised the podcast's video-first approach, writing "shouldn't there be more to see than two people in armchairs, a couple of plants and some rudimentary animation? This feels like the right subject and pairing to engage younger audiences, but not yet the right format".
