= The Rest Is Football =

British podcast and television series

- Genre: Football
- Format: Audio / Video podcast
- Language: English

Cast and voices
- Hosted by: Alan Shearer; Gary Lineker; Micah Richards

Production
- Length: 10–50 minutes

Publication
- Original release: 11 August 2023

The Rest Is Football is a British podcast and media programme hosted by Gary Lineker, Alan Shearer and Micah Richards, launching in August 2023 and becoming one of the most popular sports podcasts in the United Kingdom. The podcast is produced by Goalhanger Podcasts. The programme covers football news, matches, players, managers and wider issues within the sport. The programme began as an audio podcast before expanding into video production, licensed football footage, archive programming and television broadcasting. It forms part of Goalhanger's wider "The Rest Is..." podcast network.

== Background and format ==
Goalhanger had previously produced football-related podcasts, including Lineker & Baker: Behind Closed Doors, launched in 2018 and presented by Gary Lineker and Danny Baker. The programme focused on football stories and personal experiences rather than conventional match coverage. Following the success of other Goalhanger productions, including The Rest Is History (launched in 2020) and The Rest Is Politics (launched in 2022), The Rest Is Football was launched in August 2023 with Lineker, Alan Shearer and Micah Richards as presenters.

The programme follows the wider Goalhanger approach of using established figures with expertise in their fields and a conversational format designed around personality and storytelling, and also replicates the line-up from the Goalhanger produced Match of the Day: Top Ten. It features discussions between the presenters about football news, matches, players and wider issues within the sport. Episodes combine analysis with personal experiences from the presenters' playing and broadcasting careers. The podcast has also featured interviews with footballers and other figures connected with the game.

Lineker, Shearer and Richards are all former professional footballers who had moved into the media and featured on Match of the Day, Lineker as presenter with Shearer and Richards as pundits. Lineker and Shearer were both strikers in their playing career, with Richards playing as a full-back, and between them they represented England 156 times spanning the years from 1984 to 2012 and garnering 79 goals between them. Gary Lineker is the only player to have been the top goal-scorer in England with three clubs, and won the 1986 World Cup Golden Boot as tournament top goal-scorer. He later became a television presenter, including presenting Match of the Day from 1999 to 2025 . Alan Shearer won the UEFA Euro Golden Boot at UEFA Euro 1996, and is the Premier League's record goalscorer. Micah Richards was the youngest defender to be selected by England at the time of his debut, and he played for the Great Britain team in the 2012 Olympics. The programme brings together three former professional footballers from different generations, combining playing experience with their subsequent careers in football media.

=== Expansion into video ===
In 2025, Goalhanger expanded The Rest Is Football. First, in April 2025 it launched a podcast covering the women's game, The Rest Is Football: Daly Brightness. Then it moved into video-first production with The Rest Is Football: LaLiga. Produced in partnership with LaLiga, the series used official match footage alongside discussion and analysis. The move represented a shift from traditional audio podcasting towards video-led sports content distributed through platforms including YouTube and Spotify Video. In 2026, Goalhanger secured rights to use Premier League archive footage for The Rest Is Football, leading to the creation of Premier League Greats: The Moments That Made Them, a video series examining notable players and moments from Premier League history. The deal was described as a first for podcasting, reflecting the increasing overlap between podcasts, streaming television and traditional sports broadcasting.

=== Netflix adaptation ===
During the 2026 FIFA World Cup, The Rest Is Football was adapted into a New York studio based daily television programme on Netflix.The series featured football analysis, interviews and discussion presented by Lineker, Shearer and Richards, with guest appearances from figures connected with football and entertainment. The move was covered as part of wider changes in sports broadcasting, with digital-first productions increasingly operating alongside established broadcasters. Rob Jones and The Rest is Football: La Liga co-host Alex Aljoe joined the podcast as reporters, Jones embedded with the England camp and Aljoe as a roving reporter, with Joe Cole featuring as a regular guest. The Netflix adaptation received mixed reviews from television critics. Reviews noted that the chemistry between Lineker, Shearer and Richards remained central to the programme, although some critics questioned whether moving the podcast format to television added enough beyond the original audio version. The Netflix adaptation introduced a recurring speed darts challenge alongside the football discussion and interviews, in which guests competed to achieve the highest score within 45 seconds. The segment featured guests including professional darts player Luke Littler. The show was reported to have garnered audiences of around 100,000 viewers per episode.

The Netflix adaptation of the show was recommissioned towards the end of its 40 episode run covering the 2026 World Cup for a further two years. The show will be broadcast on Mondays and Fridays from the 21st August and focus on the Premier League and talking points within the game. The deal includes broadcasts covering the UEFA Euro 2028 championship, co-hosted by England, Scotland, Wales, and the Republic of Ireland.

== Reception and impact ==
The podcast has received coverage as an example of the growth of football podcasts and personality-led sports media. A 2025 interview with Marcus Rashford became one of the programme's most viewed episodes, receiving more than 1.4 million views across platforms within two days of publication. Coverage has focused on the presenters' chemistry and the programme's development from a podcast into a wider football media brand. The development of The Rest Is Football reflects wider changes in sports media, where podcasts increasingly operate across audio, video and streaming platforms. Research into sports podcasting has examined how podcasts can create new relationships between audiences, platforms and sports organisations, with programmes moving beyond audio distribution into wider media ecosystems. The Rest Is Football has been cited as an example of this shift, moving from a conversational podcast format into video production, licensed sports content and television broadcasting. The Netflix show, broadcast during the 2026 World Cup was noted in the Radio Times as a success, being "a mainstay in the Netflix top 10 TV chart throughout and [having] peaked at No.1 in the UK".
