= Beme (company) =

American multimedia company

Beme Inc.
- Type: Subsidiary
- Industry: Technology; Social media News
- Founded: 2014; 12 years ago in New York City, U.S.
- Founder: Casey Neistat; Matt Hackett
- Defunct: August 8, 2019; 7 years ago
- Fate: Merged with CNN Digital Studios
- Headquarters: CNN Center, Atlanta, Georgia, U.S.
- Area served: Worldwide
- Key people: Casey Neistat (Co-founder & executive producer)
- Products: Beme News; Beme Panels; Beme (app); Exit Poll Live
- Parent: CNN (2017–present)
- Website: beme.com ()

Beme Inc. (/ˈbiːm/), stylized as beme, was a multimedia company founded by Matt Hackett and Casey Neistat, a vlogger and short filmmaker on YouTube. Beme Inc. was the creator of the mobile app Beme. On November 28, 2016, CNN announced that it would acquire Beme. CNN intended to invest in the company and create a new brand focused on a young audience. The Beme app was officially shut down on January 31, 2017. Beme was merged into CNN Digital Studios on January 25, 2018. Despite this, the Beme News YouTube channel was still active until the closure in 2019.

== History ==
In 2014, Beme Inc. was founded by Matt Hackett and Casey Neistat. On July 17, 2015, Beme Inc. released a mobile app called Beme on the iOS App Store. The app enables users to produce unedited 2-to-8-second videos, which are immediately uploaded and shared with the user's subscribers, without the ability to preview the video. On May 2, 2016, Beme was released for Android on the Google Play Store. At TechCrunch, in May 2016, Neistat informed that they had raised a total of US$6M and had 11 full-time employees (10 technical, 1 responsible for social media). He also reported that burn rate was around US $180k per month and that his salary was US$0.

=== Acquisition by CNN ===
On November 28, 2016, CNN announced the acquisition of Beme Inc. for a reported US$25 million. On November 29, 2016, Matt Hackett, co-founder of Beme Inc., announced via an email to its users that the Beme app would be shutting down on January 31, 2017. Since the shutdown of the app, it was announced that CNN intended to use the current talent behind the Beme app to work on a separate start-up endeavor. Beme's current team would retain full creative control of the new project which was scheduled to release in the summer of 2017. Beme brought on the host of Vsauce 3, Jake Roper, as Head of Production.

On January 25, 2018, Casey Neistat announced on his YouTube channel that he and Beme co-founder Matt Hackett were leaving Beme Inc. and that Beme would be folded into CNN Digital Studios. Neistat would still be credited as an Executive Producer for the show. A YouTube channel titled Beme News made content until August 2019.
