= Leading (podcast) =

- Genre: Talk
- Format: Audio podcast
- Language: English

Cast and voices
- Hosted by: Alastair Campbell; Rory Stewart

Production
- Length: 35-65 minutes

Publication
- No. of episodes: 153
- Original release: 16 January 2023

Reception
- Ratings: 4.6153846153846/5

Related
- Website: https://therestispolitics.supportingcast.fm/

Leading is a British podcast launched in January 2023. Hosted by Alastair Campbell and Rory Stewart, it is a sister podcast of their weekly politics podcast The Rest is Politics. The podcast is produced by Goalhanger Podcasts.

== Background ==
Both Alastair Campbell and Rory Stewart have been active in British politics. Campbell is a journalist and political strategist, who served as the communications chief for Tony Blair. A former member of the Labour Party, Campbell was expelled after he voted for the Liberal Democrats in the 2019 European elections.

Stewart is a former diplomat, author and politician. He served as Conservative international development secretary and prisons minister under Theresa May, and was a member of parliament for around nine years. In 2019, having rebelled against Boris Johnson's approach to Brexit, he was expelled from the parliamentary party. He later resigned his party membership as well.

Campbell and Stewart's podcast The Rest is Politics, launched in March 2022, is aimed at providing a temperate and informed political debate in the United Kingdom. As part of the podcast, the hosts would interview former and active political figures. These interviews were released irregularly, as opposed to the main podcast, which releases two episodes on Wednesday and Thursday of each week. Their mantra is to "disagree agreeably."

In January 2023, Goalhanger Podcasts launched Leading as a spin off, allowing Campbell and Stewart to interview on a regular basis as well as to interview non-political figures. Their guests have included both former and sitting heads of state such as Angela Merkel, Bill Clinton, Anthony Albanese, Ahmed al-Sharaa, and Volodymyr Zelenskyy; British politicians including Nicola Sturgeon, Theresa May, and Sadiq Khan; and other notable figures such as Bill Gates, Arnold Schwarzenegger, and Sir Tim Berners-Lee.

== Episodes ==
The podcast usually releases a new episode every Monday. Former UK deputy prime minister Michael Heseltine was the podcast's first guest. Some episodes are recorded with only Campbell as the interviewer. In such episodes, Stewart sometimes discusses the interview at the end with Campbell, without the relevant guest being present.

Key
*	Interviewed only by Campbell

No.	Guest(s)	Running time	Original release date	Link
1	Michael Heseltine	48:33	January 16, 2023	link at Apple Podcasts
Former UK deputy prime minister Michael Heseltine discusses premierships of Margaret Thatcher and Rishi Sunak, Brexit, and UK miners' strike of 1984–85.
2	Marina Litvinenko*	48:27	January 23, 2023	link at Apple Podcasts
Widow of murdered British-naturalised Russian defector and Putin critic Alexander Litvinenko discusses her husband's poisoning and death, Vladimir Putin, and the invasion of Ukraine.
3	Alan Milburn	55:16	January 30, 2023	link at Apple Podcasts
Former UK health secretary Milburn discusses NHS crisis and nurses' strikes, his tenure in Tony Blair's government, New Labour, and his upbringing.
4	Michel Barnier	41:25	February 6, 2023	link at Apple Podcasts
EU Brexit chief negotiator Michel Barnier discusses Brexit and his career in French politics.
5	Michael Johnson*	41:43	February 13, 2023	link at Apple Podcasts
American sprinter and Olympic Games medalist Michael Johnson discusses future of athletics, taking the knee, and doping in sport.
6	David Lammy	56:35	February 20, 2023	link at Apple Podcasts
UK shadow foreign secretary David Lammy discusses Brexit, international development, and his upbringing.
7	Fiona Hill	55:40	February 27, 2023	link at Apple Podcasts
British-American foreign affairs specialist Fiona Hill discusses her upbringing in Bishop Auckland, the Ukraine conflict, and her work in the Trump Administration.
8	Bertie Ahern*	52:18	March 6, 2023	link at Apple Podcasts
Former Irish Taoiseach Bertie Ahern discusses his father's involvement in the anti-Treaty IRA, his own contribution to the Good Friday Agreement, and Northern Ireland peace process.
9	Bernie Sanders	40:11	March 13, 2023	link at Apple Podcasts
US Senator Bernie Sanders discusses his presidential run and American healthcare reform.
10	Rahima Mahmut*	51:13	March 20, 2023	link at Apple Podcasts
Uyghur artist and human rights activist Rahima Mahmut discusses the persecution of Uyghurs in China and the Xinjiang conflict.
11	Gary Lineker	56:23	March 27, 2023	link at Apple Podcasts
English footballer and sports broadcaster Gary Lineker discusses his career and 2023 suspension from Match of the Day.
12	David Baddiel	51:59	April 3, 2023	link at Apple Podcasts
English comedian, presenter, and author David Baddiel discusses his maternal family's entry into Britain as refugees during the Holocaust, antisemitism in the UK, his polemic Jews Don't Count, and his co-written song Three Lions.
13	Brian Cox*	38:14	April 10, 2023	link at Apple Podcasts
Scottish actor Brian Cox discusses Succession, SNP, and Scottish independence.
14	David Miliband	56:20	April 17, 2023	link at Apple Podcasts
Former UK foreign secretary and President of the International Rescue Committee David Miliband discusses New Labour and his work for the IRC providing humanitarian aid.
15	Hillary Clinton	41:10	April 24, 2023	link at Apple Podcasts
Former US secretary of state, senator, and first lady Hillary Clinton discusses Operation Neptune Spear, her loss in the 2016 US presidential election, and her tenure as secretary of state.
16	Tony Blair	40:21	May 1, 2023	link at Apple Podcasts
Former UK prime minister Tony Blair discusses the Northern Ireland peace process and Good Friday Agreement.
17	Gerry Adams	42:07	May 8, 2023	link at Apple Podcasts
Irish republican politician Gerry Adams discusses The Troubles.
18	George Osborne	01:04:22	May 15, 2023	link at Apple Podcasts
Former UK chancellor George Osborne discusses his chancellorship and austerity programme.
19	Leo Varadkar	34:05	May 22, 2023	link at Apple Podcasts
Irish Taoiseach Leo Varadkar discusses his upbringing, Irish politics and foreign policy, and artificial intelligence.
20	Jonathan Powell	51:45	May 29, 2023	link at Apple Podcasts
Former Downing Street chief of staff Jonathan Powell discusses New Labour and Northern Ireland peace process.
21	Mary McAleese*	47:35	June 5, 2023	link at Apple Podcasts
Former Irish president Mary McAleese discusses her legal career and presidency, Catholic Church in Ireland, and Northern Ireland peace process.
22	Kate Raworth	56:24	June 12, 2023	link at Apple Podcasts
English economist Kate Raworth discusses doughnut economics and economic sustainability.
23	John Major: Part 1	46:08	June 19, 2023	link at Apple Podcasts
Former UK prime minister John Major discusses his early political career and resignation of Margaret Thatcher.
24	John Major: Part 2	01:01:17	June 26, 2023	link at Apple Podcasts
Former UK prime minister John Major discusses his premiership, Gulf War, and Black Wednesday.
25	Michael Ignatieff	59:21	July 3, 2023	link at Apple Podcasts
Former Canadian opposition leader and academic Michael Ignatieff discusses his career and climate change.
26	Francis Fukuyama	55:23	July 10, 2023	link at Apple Podcasts
American political scientist and international relations writer Francis Fukuyama discusses his The End of History thesis and authoritarianism.
27	Feargal Sharkey*	44:51	July 17, 2023	link at Apple Podcasts
Northern Irish singer Feargal Sharkey discusses his upbringing in Derry and environmental campaigning.
28	Paul Nurse	1:04:32	July 24, 2023	link at Apple Podcasts
British geneticist and Nobel laureate for Physiology Paul Nurse discusses future of British science and British government response to the COVID-19 pandemic
29	Yuval Noah Harari: Part 1	54:13	July 31, 2023	link at Apple Podcasts
Israeli public intellectual and historian Yuval Noah Harari discusses 2023 Israeli protests.
30	Anthony Joshua	54:41	August 7, 2023	link at Apple Podcasts
British professional boxer Anthony Joshua discusses his career.
31	Yuval Noah Harari: Part 2	58:41	August 14, 2023	link at Apple Podcasts
Israeli public intellectual and historian Yuval Noah Harari discusses artificial intelligence and populism in the 21st century.
32	Miriam González Durántez	58:15	August 21, 2023	link at Apple Podcasts
Spanish lawyer and vice chair of UBS Europe Miriam González Durántez discusses gender equality, and Cameron-Clegg coalition.
33	Mustafa Suleyman	01:04:34	August 28, 2023	link at Apple Podcasts
British artificial intelligence researcher Mustafa Suleyman discusses artificial intelligence, and his early life and career.
34	Ed Davey	01:12:11	September 4, 2023	link at Apple Podcasts
Former British energy secretary and Lib Dem leader Ed Davey discusses the Cameron-Clegg coalition and the 2024 United Kingdom general election.
35	Catherine Ashton	01:01:58	September 11, 2023	link at Apple Podcasts
Former High Representative of the Union for Foreign Affairs discusses her career and the European Union.
36	Andy Burnham and Andy Street	57:17	September 18, 2023	link at Apple Podcasts
Inaugural mayors of Greater Manchester (Burnham) and West Midlands (Street) discuss devolved local government in England and their mayoral careers.
37	Chris Hipkins	56:45	September 25, 2023	link at Apple Podcasts
New Zealand prime minister Chris Hipkins discusses New Zealand COVID response, upcoming election, and relations with China.
38	Theresa May: Part 1	55:34	October 2, 2023	link at Apple Podcasts
Former UK prime minister Theresa May discusses her tenure as Home Secretary, Windrush scandal, and Hillsborough disaster.
39	Theresa May: Part 2	55:39	October 9, 2023	link at Apple Podcasts
Former UK prime minister Theresa May discusses her tenure as prime minister, Brexit negotiations, and Donald Trump.
40	Minette Batters	56:50	October 16, 2023	link at Apple Podcasts
NFU president and British farmer Minette Batters discusses British agriculture, post-Brexit UK FTAs, and Net Zero.
41	Reid Hoffman	01:12:49	October 23, 2023	link at Apple Podcasts
American venture capitalist and LinkedIn co-founder Reid Hoffman discusses AI, PayPal Mafia, and 2024 US presidential race.
42	Sayeeda Warsi	55:47	October 27, 2023	link at Apple Podcasts
Former UK cabinet minister and House of Lords member Sayeeda Warsi discusses Islamophobia in the United Kingdom and Gaza war.
43	Arnold Schwarzenegger	53:23	October 30, 2023	link at Apple Podcasts
Former California governor and actor Arnold Schwarzenegger discusses his early life, career, and 2024 US presidential race.
44	Mark Carney	01:03:53	November 6, 2023	link at Apple Podcasts
Canadian economist and former Bank of England governor Mark Carney discusses austerity, monetary policy, and climate change.
45	Comfort Ero	59:47	November 13, 2023	link at Apple Podcasts
Crisis Group CEO Comfort Ero discusses United Nations and international peace.
46	Arancha González Laya	51:51	November 20, 2023	link at Apple Podcasts
Former Spanish foreign minister Arancha González Laya discusses her career, Russian invasion of Ukraine, and AI regulation.
47	Tony Klug	49:07	November 24, 2023	link at Apple Podcasts
British international affairs consultant Tony Klug discusses Arab-Israeli conflict and Gaza war.
48	Simon Sebag Montefiore	47:17	November 27, 2023	link at Apple Podcasts
British historian Simon Sebag Montefiore discusses Arab-Israeli conflict and his book Jerusalem: The Biography.
49	Christiana Figueres	57:28	December 4, 2023	link at Apple Podcasts
Costa Rican diplomat and former UNFCCC executive secretary Christiana Figueres discusses climate change and COP 2028.
50	Angela Rayner	1:09:33	December 11, 2023	link at Apple Podcasts
UK Labour deputy leader Angela Rayner discusses upcoming UK general election and Labour leadership of Jeremy Corbyn.
51	Tim Peake	1:00:02	December 18, 2023	link at Apple Podcasts
British astronaut Tim Peake discusses his Army Air Corps career, and space exploration and colonisation.
52	Tom Holland	1:03:32	December 25, 2023	link at Apple Podcasts
British historian Tom Holland discusses influence of Christianity on Western culture.
53	Seb Coe	1:01:23	January 1, 2024	link at Apple Podcasts
British sports Seb Coe discusses his athletics, politics and sports administration careers, 2020 London Olympics, and doping.
54	Guy Verhofstadt	55:47	January 8, 2024	link at Apple Podcasts
Former Belgian prime minister and MEP discusses his decade-long premiership and further integration of the European Union.
55	Gillian Keegan	01:11:43	January 15, 2024	link at Apple Podcasts
UK education secretary Gillian Keegan discusses her early life and career, and education in the UK.
56	Bill Gates	57:00	January 22, 2024	link at Apple Podcasts
American businessman and philanthropist Bill Gates discusses development of Microsoft and his philanthropic interests.
57	Tucker Eskew	56:23	January 29, 2024	link at Apple Podcasts
American communications director Tucker Eskew discusses 2016 and 2024 US elections, Republican Revolution, and Trumpism.
58	Humza Yousaf	01:04:30	February 5, 2024	link at Apple Podcasts
Scotland's first minister Humza Yousaf discusses Scottish independence and the Gaza war.
59	Robert Sapolsky	01:05:53	February 12, 2024	link at Apple Podcasts
American neuroendocrinologist Robert Sapolsky discusses his work on free will and political polarization in the United States.
60	Anthony Scaramucci	01:08:31	February 19, 2024	link at Apple Podcasts
American financier and former White House communications director Anthony Scaramucci discusses 2024 US election and campaign finance in the US.
61	James Rubin	01:08:52	February 26, 2024	link at Apple Podcasts
American diplomat James Rubin discusses foreign policy of Joe Biden and American interventionism.
62	Sajid Javid: Part 1	42:21	March 4, 2024	link at Apple Podcasts
Former UK chancellor Sajid Javid discusses his 2019 Tory leadership run and Islamophobia in the Tory party.
63	Sajid Javid: Part 2	42:21	March 8, 2024	link at Apple Podcasts
Former UK chancellor Sajid Javid discusses the Johnson premiership and the decision to revoke Shamima Begum's citizenship.
64	Caroline Lucas	01:07:02	March 11, 2024	link at Apple Podcasts
Former Green Party leader Caroline Lucas discusses her career.
65	Albin Kurti	01:03:28	March 18, 2024	link at Apple Podcasts
Kosovar prime minister Albin Kurti discusses his career and imprisonment, and Kosovar independence and foreign relations.
66	Antony Gormley	01:05:49	March 25, 2024	link at Apple Podcasts
British sculptor Antony Gormley discusses his work and art.
67	Eliza Manningham-Buller and John Sawers	01:11:13	April 1, 2024	link at Apple Podcasts
Former British intelligence officers Eliza Manningham-Buller (MI5 director general) and John Sawers (MI6 chief) discuss espionage and their careers.
68	Edward Kessler	00:56:29	April 8, 2024	link at Apple Podcasts
British theologian Edward Kessler discusses the Israel-Palestine conflict.
69	Dieter Helm	01:14:00	April 15, 2024	link at Apple Podcasts
British economist and academic Dieter Helm discusses COP conferences and Net Zero.
70	Sadiq Khan	01:10:36	April 22, 2024	link at Apple Podcasts
London mayor Sadiq Khan discusses his tenure as London mayor and religion in UK politics.
71	Ehud Olmert	01:03:59	April 29, 2024	link at Apple Podcasts
Former Israeli prime minister Ehud Olmert discusses 2023 Israeli invasion of Gaza and Benjamin Netanyahu's government
72	Nancy Pelosi	58:07	May 6, 2024	link at Apple Podcasts
Former US House speaker Nancy Pelosi discusses her career and campaign finance in the United States.
73	Kwasi Kwarteng: Part 1	44:09	May 13, 2024	link at Apple Podcasts
Former UK chancellor Kwasi Kwarteng discusses Johnson government, Rwanda asylum scheme, and British Empire.
74	Kwasi Kwarteng: Part 2	54:38	May 20, 2024	link at Apple Podcasts
Former UK chancellor Kwasi Kwarteng discusses Truss government and his mini-budget.
75	Kyriakos Mitsotakis	01:05:14	May 26, 2024	link at Apple Podcasts
Greek prime minister Kyriakos Mitsotakis discusses his premiership, migration, and the Elgin Marbles.
76	Rachel Reeves	01:11:32	May 27, 2024	link at Apple Podcasts
UK shadow chancellor Rachel Reeves discusses her career and Labour's economic plan.
77	David Blunkett: Part 1	47:10	June 3, 2024	link at Apple Podcasts
Former British Education and Home Secretary David Blunkett discusses his early life, blindness, and early political career.
78	David Blunkett: Part 2	52:00	June 10, 2024	link at Apple Podcasts
Former British Education and Home Secretary David Blunkett discusses his career in the New Labour government.
79	Nadhim Zahawi	48:54	June 14, 2024	link at Apple Podcasts
Former UK chancellor Nadhim Zahawi discusses early life, Johnson premiership, and COVID-19 vaccination in the UK.
80	Bridget Phillipson	57:00	June 17, 2024	link at Apple Podcasts
UK shadow education secretary Bridget Phillipson discusses Labour under Corbyn, and Labour's education policy.
81	Alex Chalk	58:53	June 24, 2024	link at Apple Podcasts
UK justice secretary and Lord Chancellor Alex Chalk discusses his career, Brexit, and prison crisis in the UK.
82	Wes Streeting	58:41	June 28, 2024	link at Apple Podcasts
UK shadow health secretary Wes Streeting discusses his career, faith, and National Health Service.
83	Gus O'Donnell	55:04	July 1, 2024	link at Apple Podcasts
Former UK Cabinet Secretary Gus O'Donnell discusses transition of power in the UK and the Civil Service.
84	Helle Thorning-Schmidt	1:00:51	July 8, 2024	link at Apple Podcasts
Former Danish prime minister Helle Thorning-Schmidt discusses her premiership.
85	Lisa Nandy	1:10:08	July 15, 2024	link at Apple Podcasts
UK culture secretary Lisa Nandy discusses her career and cabinet portfolio.
86	Nick Clegg: Part 1	1:00:29	July 22, 2024	link at Apple Podcasts
Former UK deputy prime minister Nick Clegg discusses Lib Dems, Cameron-Clegg coalition, and 2015 UK election.
87	Nick Clegg: Part 2	1:02:51	July 29, 2024	link at Apple Podcasts
Former UK deputy prime minister Nick Clegg discusses the Cameron-Clegg coalition and his role at Facebook.
88	David Frum	1:11:11	August 5, 2024	link at Apple Podcasts
American speechwriter David Frum discusses his work for George W. Bush and 2024 US presidential race.
89	David Davis	1:07:25	August 12, 2024	link at Apple Podcasts
Former UK Brexit secretary David Davis discusses his career and politics.
90	Peter Malinauskas	1:05:32	August 19, 2024	link at Apple Podcasts
South Australia premier Peter Malinauskas discusses his career and negative impact of social media on children.
91	John Anzalone	34:00	August 23, 2024	link at Apple Podcasts
American pollster John Anzalone interviewed at 2024 Democratic National Convention.
92	Bob Mulholland	28:52	August 24, 2024	link at Apple Podcasts
American political operative Bob Mulholland interviewed at 2024 Democratic National Convention.
93	Rosa DeLauro	20:57	August 25, 2024	link at Apple Podcasts
American congresswoman Rosa DeLauro interviewed at 2024 Democratic National Convention.
94	Josh Elliott	17:26	August 26, 2024	link at Apple Podcasts
American state representative Josh Elliott interviewed at 2024 Democratic National Convention.
95	David Urban	23:49	August 27, 2024	link at Apple Podcasts
American lobbyist David Urban interviewed at 2024 Democratic National Convention.
96	Frank Luntz	59:00	September 2, 2024	link at Apple Podcasts
American pollster Frank Luntz discusses 2024 United States presidential election.
97	Audrey Tang	52:15	September 9, 2024	link at Apple Podcasts
Audrey Tang discusses how to fight fake news and strengthen democracy.
98	Nate Silver	51:26	September 16, 2024	link at Apple Podcasts
American forecaster Nate Silver discusses how we can predict who will win the 2024 United States presidential election.
99	Douglas Alexander	58:40	September 23, 2024	link at Apple Podcasts
Labour minister Douglas Alexander discusses working with Tony Blair and Gordon Brown in New Labour.
100	Anne Applebaum	49:02	September 30, 2024	link at Apple Podcasts
American journalist and historian Anne Applebaum discusses corruption, Populism, and Ending the War in Ukraine.
101	Alan Johnson: Part 1	43:57	October 7, 2024	link at Apple Podcasts
Long-serving Labour minister Alan Johnson discusses the impact of post-war years in Britain and if he could have been prime minister.
102	Alan Johnson: Part 2	40:39	October 14, 2024	link at Apple Podcasts
Long-serving Labour minister Alan Johnson discusses the Labour Leave campaign and what they should be doing in their policies.
103	Justin Welby	01:21:54	October 21, 2024	link at Apple Podcasts
The Archbishop of Canterbury discusses faith, mental health, and the future of the church.
104	Timothy Snyder	1:00:46	October 28, 2024	link at Apple Podcasts
American historian discusses the potential impacts of the 2024 United States presidential election and possible outcomes of conflicts around the world.
105	George Mitchell	1:05:04	November 1, 2024	link at Apple Podcasts
American politician George Mitchell discusses counter-terrorism.
106	Michael Lewis	54:18	November 4, 2024	link at Apple Podcasts
American financial journalist and author discusses Sam Bankman-Fried and the future of the US.
107	David Petraeus	1:13:44	November 11, 2024	link at Apple Podcasts
Former Director of the Central Intelligence Agency General David Petraeus discusses America's conflicts.
108	Mhairi Black	51:34	November 18, 2024	link at Apple Podcasts
Former Scottish MP Mhairi Black discusses the SNP's approach to independence.
109	Kim Leadbeater	51:37	November 25, 2024	link at Apple Podcasts
Labour MP Kim Leadbeater discusses assisted suicide.
110	Chris Patten	1:11:22	December 2, 2024	link at Apple Podcasts
The last Governor of Hong Kong discusses China and its relationship with the West.
111	Angela Merkel	1:06:46	December 9, 2024	link at Apple Podcasts
The former Chancellor of Germany discusses the future of Europe.
112	Bill Clinton	49:39	December 16, 2024	link at Apple Podcasts
Former President of the United States Bill Clinton discusses his decisions as President and the 2016 United States presidential election.
113	Ian Bremmer	57:16	December 23, 2024	link at Apple Podcasts
American political scientist Ian Bremmer discusses the world's biggest conflicts.
114	Eluned Morgan	49:54	December 30, 2024	link at Apple Podcasts
The First Minister of Wales Eluned Morgan discusses the future of Wales.
115	Ben Wallace	01:31:05	January 6, 2025	link at Apple Podcasts
The former Secretary of State for Defence discusses the UK's foreign policies.
116	James Manyika	01:06:54	January 13, 2025	link at Apple Podcasts
The Senior Vice President of Google discusses the future of artificial intelligence.
117	Thomas Fletcher (diplomat)	01:03:10	January 20, 2025	link at Apple Podcasts
The Under-Secretary-General for Humanitarian Affairs and Emergency Relief Coordinator Thomas Fletcher discusses if the United Nations is able to cope without American support.
118	Uzi Arad	01:20:36	January 27, 2025	link at Apple Podcasts
Former head of Mossad intelligence and National Security Advisor to Benjamin Netanyahu discusses Israel's war with Hamas.
119	Tommy Vietor	01:02:34	February 3, 2025	link at Apple Podcasts
Former speechwriter for Barack Obama discusses American political corruption and President Obama's rise to President.
120	Ahmed al-Sharaa	01:07:54	February 10, 2025	link at Apple Podcasts
The President of Syria discusses his rise to leadership and the future of Syria.
121	Yulia Navalnaya	55:02	February 17, 2025	link at Apple Podcasts
The wife of Alexei Navalny discusses her husband's opposition to Putin and how to oppose his Russian leadership.
122	Frans Timmermans	59:16	February 24, 2025	link at Apple Podcasts
Dutch Politician Frans Timmermans discusses the threats to Europe.
123	Chrystia Freeland and Mark Carney	02:03:55	March 3, 2025	link at Apple Podcasts
Canadian Prime Minister candidates Mark Carney and Chrystia Freeland discuss how they would lead Canada if successful in the 2025 Liberal Party of Canada leadership election.
124	Michael Wolff	53:09	March 10, 2025	link at Apple Podcasts
Journalist Michael Wolff discusses how to report within Donald Trump's inner circle.
125	Peter Kyle	01:10:39	March 17, 2025	link at Apple Podcasts
The Secretary of State for Science, Innovation and Technology Peter Kyle discusses the UK's technological ideas.
126	Francesca Albanese	01:04:10	March 24, 2025	link at Apple Podcasts
The UN Special Rapporteur on the occupied Palestinian territories Francesca Albanese discusses the role of the UN in Palestine.
127	Moises Naim	47:04	March 31, 2025	link at Apple Podcasts
Former Venezuelan minister Moises Naim discusses freedom in America.
128	Simon Hart	01:02:13	April 7, 2025	link at Apple Podcasts
Former Chief Whip of the Conservative Party Simon Hart discusses the workings of Westminster.
129	Ezra Klein	01:11:05	April 14, 2025	link at Apple Podcasts
American author Ezra Klein discusses President Trump's America.
130	Anthony Albanese	01:10:04	April 21, 2025	link at Apple Podcasts
The Prime Minister of Australia discusses the progress made in the Australian Government.
131	Atul Gawande	01:04:02	April 28, 2025	link at Apple Podcasts
American surgeon Atul Gawande discusses the global health cris.
132	Sir Alex Younger	01:07:19	May 5, 2025	link at Apple Podcasts
Former head of MI6 Sir Alex Younger discusses the role of the UK's intelligence services.
133	Jim Himes	01:03:36	May 12, 2025	link at Apple Podcasts
Congressman Jim Himes discusses the relationship of President Trump's administration and Europe.
134	Arab Barghouti	57:37	May 19, 2025	link at Apple Podcasts
The son of Palestinian politician Marwan Barghouti discusses his father and who could lead Palestine.
135	Ed Miliband: Part 1	54:37	May 26, 2025	link at Apple Podcasts
Former Labour leader Ed Miliband discusses his time as party leader.
136	Ed Miliband: Part 2	52:54	May 30, 2025	link at Apple Podcasts
Former Labour leader Ed Miliband discusses the arguments for Net Zero.
137	Jacinda Ardern	01:09:19	June 2, 2025	link at Apple Podcasts
Former Prime Minister of New Zealand Jacina Ardern dicusses her time as Prime Minister and how New Zealand should navigate its alliances.
138	Jonathan Haidt	01:08:54	June 9, 2025	link at Apple Podcasts
American author Jonathan Haidt discusses social media and phone addictions.
139	Kevin McCarthy	01:10:43	June 16, 2025	link at Apple Podcasts
Former Speaker of the United States House of Representatives Kevin McCarthy discusses President Trump's political strategy.
140	Gabriel Attal	01:08:21	June 23, 2025	link at Apple Podcasts
Former Prime Minister of France Gabriel Attal discusses the next President of France.
141	Nikos Christodoulides	01:92:29	June 30, 2025	link at Apple Podcasts
The President of Cyprus discusses Cyprus's role in the world.
142	Emma Pinchbeck	01:05:53	July 7, 2025	link at Apple Podcasts
The Chief Executive of the Climate Change Committee discusses the UK's role in climate change.
143	Seth Moulton	01:04:54	July 14, 2025	link at Apple Podcasts
American congressman Seth Moulton discusses America's movement towards authoritarianism.
144	Gary Stevenson: Part 1	36:16	July 21, 2025	link at Apple Podcasts
Author Gary Stevenson discusses class, privilege and mental health.
145	Gary Stevenson: Part 2	47:06	July 28, 2025	link at Apple Podcasts
Author Gary Stevenson discusses the impact of policies on the economy.
146	Jeremy Hunt: Part 1	50:36	August 4, 2025	link at Apple Podcasts
The former Chancellor of the Exchequer Jeremy Hunt discusses the Labour party leadership and how to fix the NHS.
147	Jeremy Hunt: Part 2	52:34	August 11, 2025	link at Apple Podcasts
The former Chancellor of the Exchequer Jeremy Hunt discusses his time as chancellor.
148	Irfaan Ali	01:02:41	August 15, 2025	link at Apple Podcasts
The President of Guyana discusses the fastest growing economy in the world.
149	Nicola Sturgeon: Part 1	46:34	August 18, 2025	link at Apple Podcasts
The former Leader of the Scottish National Party Nicola Sturgeon discusses her influences in politics.
150	Nicola Sturgeon: Part 2	01:07:54	August 18, 2025	link at Apple Podcasts
The former Leader of the Scottish National Party Nicola Sturgeon discusses the impact of the 2014 Scottish independence referendum.
151	Jonas Gahr Støre	58:43	September 1, 2025	link at Apple Podcasts
The Prime Minister of Norway discusses Norway's relationship with the EU and Donald Trump.
152	James Elder	01:03:20	September 8, 2025	link at Apple Podcasts
UNICEF spokesperson James Elder discusses the humanitarian situation in Gaza.
153	Sir Tim Berners-Lee	01:00:27	September 15, 2025	link at Apple Podcasts
Inventor of the World Wide Web Sir Tim Berners-Lee discusses why he made the WWW a free and open space and how to reclaim it from social media companies.
154	Maro Itoje	01:02:26	September 22, 2025	link at Apple Podcasts
Captain of the England Rugby team Maro Itoje discusses the qualities of leadership, how to fight for change and the state of inequality in the UK
155	Mike Pompeo	50:40	September 29, 2025	link at Apple Podcasts
Former United States Secretary of State Mike Pompeo discusses the relationships between the United States, Russia and China and working with Donald Trump
156	John Healey	1:16:20	October 6, 2025	link at Apple Podcasts
The Secretary of State for Defence John Healey answers the questions "Is Britain ready for war?"
157	Dmytro Kuleba	1:04:30	October 13, 2025	link at Apple Podcasts
The former Ukrainian Minister of Foreign Affairs discusses the ongoing Russo-Ukrainian war
158	Baroness Hale	1:07:46	October 20, 2025	link at Apple Podcasts
The former President of the Supreme Court of the United Kingdom discusses the threats facing domestic and international law and the role of the European Court of Human Rights.
158	Michael Gove (part 1)	55:55	October 27, 2025	link at Apple Podcasts
The former British cabinet member discusses his journey from left to right on the political spectrum and his views on the Israel and the Israeli–Palestinian conflict.
159	Michael Gove (part 2)	1:11:35	November 3, 2025	link at Apple Podcasts
Michael Gove discusses his impact of British education, his position on Brexit and the future of British politics.
160	Radek Sikorski	58:22	November 10, 2025	link at Apple Podcasts
The Deputy Prime Minister of Poland talks about his experiences of a refugee in the 1980s, how the war in Ukraine might end, and the rise of populism in Europe.
161	Gareth Southgate	1:02:16	November 17, 2025	link at Apple Podcasts
The former England player and manager talks about mental health, resilience and leadership.
162	James Graham and Jacob Dunne	1:10:50	November 24, 2025	link at Apple Podcasts
Co-creators of the award-winning play Punch discuss restorative justice, forgiveness and the criminal justice system.
163	Zack Polanski	1:20:04	December 1, 2025	link at Apple Podcasts
The Leader of the Green Party talks party membership, economic reforms and why the environment doesn't seem as important as it once was.
164	Anna Wintour	1:14:22	December 8, 2025	link at Apple Podcasts
The former Editor-in-Chief of American Vogue debates decision-making, and the use of fashion and culture as tools of soft-power.
165	John Swinney	1:15:27	December 15, 2025	link at Apple Podcasts
The First Minister of Scotland talks identity, independence and how to rebuild trust in the SNP.
166	Mark Williams	1:05:53	December 22, 2025	link at Apple Podcasts
Clinical psychologist and minister Mark Williams talks about finding calm, coping with grief, and techniques for avoiding depression.
167	Populism, Security, and Leadership	1:00:38	December 29, 2025	link at Apple Podcasts
Leading presents a Climate Special; best bits from interviews with Mark Carney, Caroline Lucas, Ed Miliband, Emma Pinchbeck, and Dieter Helm.
168	Jimmy Wales	1:13:21	January 5, 2026	link at Apple Podcasts
Wikipedia's founder justifies why the statement Donald Trump is "the worst president in US history" is allowed on his page, and how Americans and Brazilians differ on the history of the aeroplane.
169	Maia Sandu	1:09:02	January 12, 2026	link at Apple Podcasts
The President of Moldova talks about fighting Russian disinformation, corruption, European Union accession and relations with Romania.
170	Neil Kinnock (part 1)	1:12:55	January 19, 2026	link at Apple Podcasts
The former leader of the UK Labour Party discusses his rebellious past, taking on the ultra-left and miners strike.
171	Neil Kinnock (part 2)	1:04:17	January 26, 2026	link at Apple Podcasts
Neil Kinnock explains why the fight against Thatcher was existential, elections losses and countering the far-right.
172	Bill Browder	0:51:33	February 2, 2026	link at Apple Podcasts
The self-described "Biggest Capitalist in Eastern Europe" talks about his communist antecedants, Sergei Magnitsky, and Putin's rationale for going to war in Ukraine
173	Sviatlana Tsikhanouskaya	0:51:33	February 6, 2026	link at Apple Podcasts
The exiled Belarusian opposition leader discusses how Aleksandr Lukashenko became the last dictator in Europe, and why her husband was jailed for opposing the Putin-backed regime.
174	Jeremy Fleming	1:10:42	February 9, 2026	link at Apple Podcasts
The former director of GCHQ talks about risks to the UK's national security, the threat posed by cybercriminals, and the power of spies.
175	Robert Malley	1:08:40	February 16, 2026	link at Apple Podcasts
The former US Special Representative for Iran discusses the future of US-Iranian relations, foreign policy under Donald Trump, and why the two-state solution for Israel and Palestine is no longer viable.
176	Olaf Scholz	0:56:03	February 23, 2026	link at Apple Podcasts
The former German Chancellor discusses Germany’s reliance on Russian gas prior to the Russian invasion of Ukraine and comments on the rise of the far-right Alternative for Germany.
177	Gavin Newsom	0:52:43	March 2, 2026	link at Apple Podcasts
Governor of California discusses a midnight phone call with Donald Trump, his thoughts on the 2026 midterms, and whether he will run for president in 2028.
178	Alexander Stubb	0:40:20	March 9, 2026	link at Apple Podcasts
Finland’s President discusses his relationship with Donald Trump, why being Prime Minister of Finland was difficult, and why he believes the Global South will shape the future.
179	Pedro Sánchez	01:14:07	March 16, 2026	link at Apple Podcasts
Prime Minister of Spain on disagreements with the United States on matters like the Gaza War and the Iran War, how Spain deals with the rise of the far-right, and lessons for Keir Starmer.
180	Ai Weiwei	01:08:00	March 23, 2026	link at Apple Podcasts
Chinese artist and activist Ai Weiwei recounts his imprisonment by the Chinese government, how the Sichuan earthquake transformed his activism, and why he believes censorship is also growing in the West.
181	Sarah McBride	01:05:00	March 30, 2026	link at Apple Podcasts
Congresswoman Sarah McBride examines the state of trans rights under Republican leadership, what must change in Congress, and whether Democrats are doing enough to reconnect with American voters.
182	Naz Shah	1:07:00	April 6, 2026	link at Apple Podcasts
Labour MP for Bradford West Naz Shah reflects on how her experiences with the justice system shaped her politics, and on the role of values and faith in modern British public life.
183	Volodymyr Zelenskyy	0:52:00	April 9, 2026	link at Apple Podcasts
President of Ukraine Volodymyr Zelenskyy outlines how Europe can deter Russian aggression without relying on the US, what Putin really wants from the war, and why the White House keeps misreading the Kremlin’s ambitions.
184	Anas Sarwar	0:58:00	April 20, 2026	link at Apple Podcasts
Leader of Scottish Labour Anas Sarwar discusses his clashes with Keir Starmer, the possibility of alliances against the SNP, and how Scotland and the UK can confront rising Islamophobia and political despair.
185	Aleksandar Vučić	01:06:00	April 27, 2026	link at Apple Podcasts
President of Serbia Aleksandar Vučić explains Serbia’s balancing act between Russia, China, and the EU, and discusses whether Serbia can join the EU without recognising Kosovo.
186	Yanis Varoufakis	01:18:00	May 4, 2026	link at Apple Podcasts
Former Greek finance minister Yanis Varoufakis explores how the 2008 financial crisis reshaped global politics, fuelled populism and the far-right across Europe, and whether the economic fallout from Trump’s war with Iran could outlast the conflict itself.
187	William MacAskill	01:08:00	May 11, 2026	link at Apple Podcasts
Scottish philosopher William MacAskill discusses the geopolitical implications of AI development and the relationship between effective altruism and artificial general intelligence.
188	Rahm Emanuel	01:13:00	May 18, 2026	link at Apple Podcasts
US politician and diplomat Rahm Emanuel discusses European Union–United States relations, the 2026 Iran war, and West Bank settlements.
