= Goalhanger =

British podcast company

Goalhanger Podcasts Ltd
- Industry: Media
- Founder: Gary Lineker; Tony Pastor; Jack Davenport
- Headquarters: Kennington, London, England
- Products: Podcasts
- Website: goalhanger.com

Goalhanger Podcasts Ltd is a British podcast production and distribution company.

According to the company, its 15 main shows collectively receive more than 75 million full-episode streams per month. In September 2026, Goalhanger shows held 44 of the 1,800 top-100 chart slots across 18 Apple Podcasts storefronts, more than iHeartMedia's 19 and Spotify's 15 combined.

== History ==
Goalhanger is a British media company co-founded by sports broadcaster and former professional footballer Gary Lineker, along with Tony Pastor, former ITV controller of sport, and Jack Davenport, a former senior journalist at the BBC (no relation to the British actor). Originally established as Goalhanger Films, the company began by producing sports documentaries featuring figures such as Wayne Rooney.

In 2018 the company expanded into podcast production, beginning with Behind Closed Doors, a football-focused series featuring Lineker and broadcaster Danny Baker. In April 2019, it launched We Have Ways of Making You Talk, a podcast centered on World War II, co-hosted by historian James Holland and comedian Al Murray.

Following the onset of the COVID-19 pandemic in 2020, Goalhanger increased its emphasis on podcasting. In November 2020, the company launched The Rest Is History, hosted by historian Dominic Sandbrook and author Tom Holland.

The company has since launched several other podcasts, including The Rest Is Politics (first published in March 2022), hosted by Alastair Campbell, an advisor to former Labour prime minister Tony Blair, and Rory Stewart, a former Conservative MP who held various ministerial portfolios; Empire (first published in August 2022), presented by William Dalrymple and Anita Anand; and The Rest Is Football (first published in August 2023), co-hosted by Lineker, Alan Shearer, and Micah Richards.

During the 2024 United Kingdom general election campaign, The Rest Is Politics and Leading recorded over 21.6 million downloads and full-episode views on YouTube. During the 2024 UEFA European Championship, The Rest Is Football received a combined total of 19.6 million downloads and full-episode views on platforms it was published on.

Since 2023, the company has introduced a subscription-based model for some shows, with features such as early access to episodes, bonus material, and priority entry to live events contributing to steady growth in their paying audiences. An interview with Davenport in 2025 revealed that Goalhanger has over 200,000 paying members.

In December 2025, Netflix signed a deal with Goalhanger to carry The Rest Is Football podcast during the 2026 FIFA World Cup.

In January 2026, The Chernin Group (Peter Chernin’s investment group) took a minority stake in Goalhanger.

In May 2026, the company launched Goalhanger Ventures, an investment and partnerships division focused on creator-led media businesses. Its first deals included an equity investment in Invisible Media and a commercial partnership with Backyard Cricket.

In June 2026, Goalhanger was ranked first in The Sunday Times 100 list of Britain's fastest-growing private companies. The company recorded sales of £37.9 million in 2025, representing average annual revenue growth of approximately 321% over the preceding three years.

== Programming ==
Title	Genre	Hosts	First released
We Have Ways of Making You Talk	History	Al Murray and James Holland	2 April 2019
The Rest Is History	History	Tom Holland and Dominic Sandbrook	2 November 2020
The Rest Is Politics	Politics	Alastair Campbell and Rory Stewart	2 March 2022
Battleground	History	Patrick Bishop and Saul David	4 April 2022
Empire	History	William Dalrymple and Anita Anand	16 August 2022
The Rest Is Politics: Leading	Politics	Alastair Campbell and Rory Stewart	16 January 2023
The Rest Is Football	Football	Gary Lineker, Alan Shearer and Micah Richards	7 August 2023
The Rest Is Money	Economics	Steph McGovern and Robert Peston	30 August 2023
Sherlock & Co.	Scripted podcast	Paul Waggott as Doctor John Watson, Harry Attwell as Sherlock Holmes, and Marta da Silva as Mariana Ametxazurra	10 October 2023
Football Clichés	Football	Adam Hurrey, Charlie Eccleshare and David Walker	17 October 2023
The Rest Is Entertainment	Entertainment	Richard Osman and Marina Hyde	28 November 2023
Walking The Dog with Emily Dean	Interview series	Emily Dean	23 December 2023
The Rest Is Politics: US	Politics	Anthony Scaramucci and Katty Kay	24 May 2024
The Rest Is Classified	Intelligence	David McCloskey and Gordon Corera	27 November 2024
Journey Through Time	History	David Olusoga and Sarah Churchwell	20 March 2025
The Rest Is Football: Daly Brightness	Football	Millie Bright and Rachel Daly	15 April 2025
The Rest Is Football: LaLiga	Football	Gary Lineker and Alex Aljoe	19 August 2025
The Rest Is Science	Science	Michael Stevens and Hannah Fry	25 November 2025
The Book Club	Literature	Dominic Sandbrook and Tabitha Syrett	17 February 2026
Bear Hunt	Scripted podcast	Donald Pirie as Sergeant Tom MacDuff, Thomas Mitchells as Prime Minister Alex Kernoway & Naomi Miller as Mel Murray	10 September 2026
