= David McCloskey =

American author

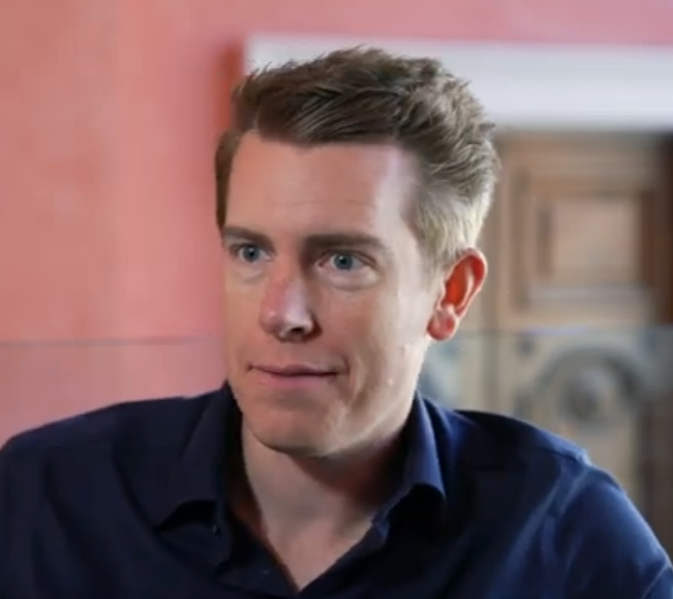
- In a 2025 interview
- Born: Minnesota, USA
- Education: Wheaton College (BA); Johns Hopkins University (MA)
- Occupations: Writer, CIA analyst, consultant
- Writing career
- Period: 2021–present
- Genre: spy fiction
- Website: www.davidmccloskeybooks.com

David McCloskey is an American writer of spy fiction and podcast host. He is a former staff member of the Central Intelligence Agency.

== Early life ==
McCloskey was born in Minnesota. He majored in international studies at Wheaton College, and holds a M.A. from the Johns Hopkins School of Advanced International Studies where he specialised in energy policy and the Middle East.

== Career ==
McCloskey worked for the Central Intelligence Agency for six years as an analyst on Syria. He was stationed across the Middle East, and regularly contributed to intelligence briefings for the White House. He left the CIA in 2016 and worked as a consultant for McKinsey, advising clients from the aerospace and transportation sectors on security issues.

He has stated that he started writing fiction partly as a way to mentally process his time at the CIA. His first novel Damascus Station was published in 2021, and tells the story of a CIA operative in Syria during the Assad regime. His novels have received generally positive reviews, and have been widely translated. In 2026, he signed a first-look deal with Prologue Entertainment to develop film and television projects based on his writing.

Since 2024, he is the co-host of the Goalhanger podcast The Rest Is Classified, which he presents with British journalist Gordon Corera.

== Bibliography ==
- Damascus Station (2021)
- Moscow X (2023)
- The Seventh Floor (2024)
- The Persian (2025)
- London Station (2026)
