= Jake Roper =

American Internet celebrity (born 1987)

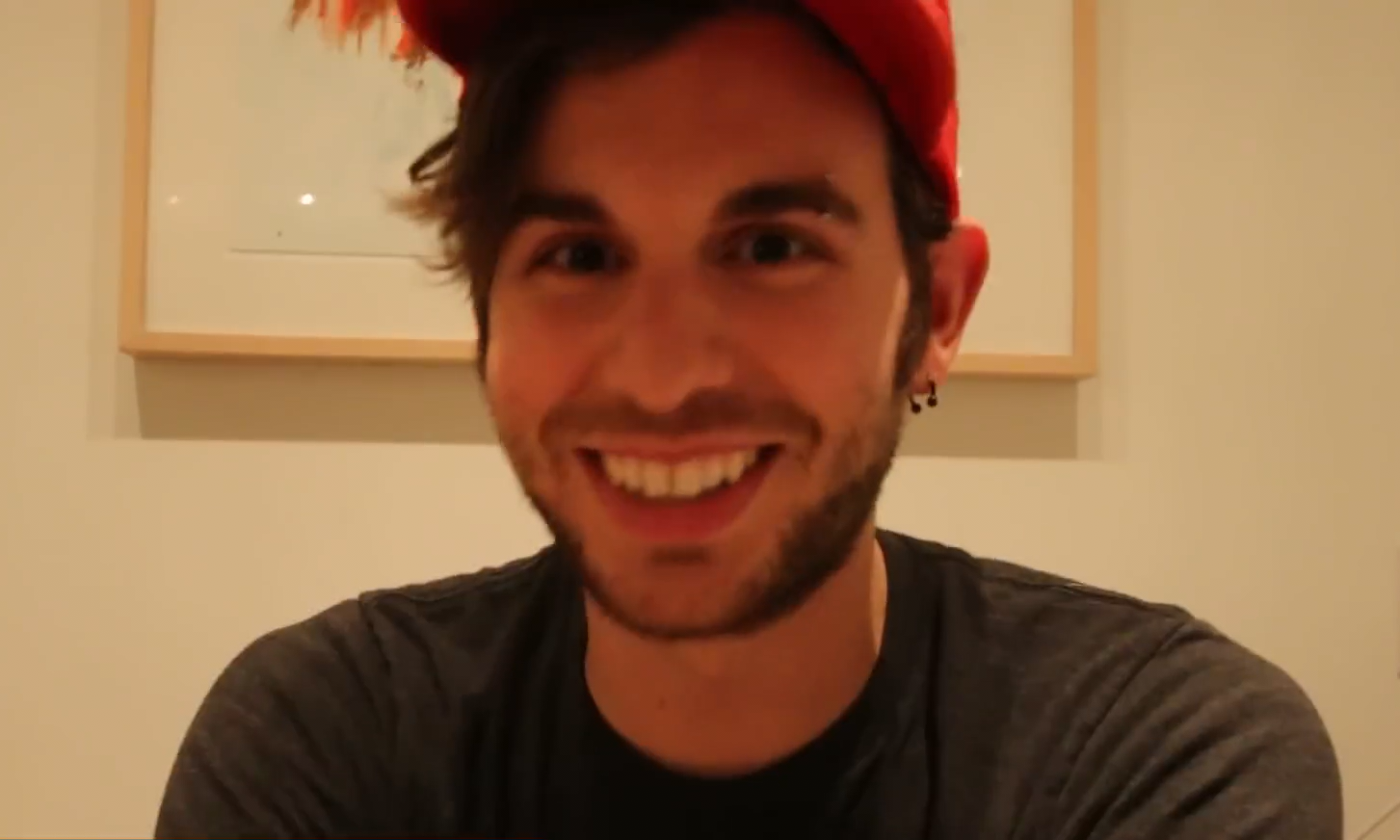
- Roper in 2016
- Born: Jacob Alexander Roper; January 25, 1987 (age 39); Evergreen, Colorado, U.S.
- Education: School of Visual Arts
- Occupation: YouTuber
- Years active: 2010–present

YouTube information
- Channel: Vsauce3
- Years active: 2010-2022
- Genres: Science, video game science
- Subscribers: 3.96 million
- Views: 532 million
- Last updated: March 21, 2026

Jacob Alexander Roper (born January 25, 1987) is an American Internet celebrity primarily known for hosting the Vsauce3 YouTube channel, which is part of the YouTube channel brand Vsauce.

== Career ==
Prior to working on YouTube, Roper used his film degree for various jobs in television and advertising. Before working with Michael Stevens under the Vsauce brand, Roper was working at Google, alongside Stevens, as well as hosting a YouTube show called Space Lab, which was a space show for kids. Roper began to host Vsauce3 in 2012.

Roper's channel focuses on explanations of the science behind fictional worlds, according to The Daily Dot in 2015. On March 31, 2017, Roper announced he had joined as the new director of production at Casey Neistat's company Beme. However, on January 31, 2018, CNN closed the Beme News division and offered the 22-person team positions in CNN.

On September 20, 2018, Roper announced he would host the YouTube Original special Could You Survive the Movies. On May 21, 2020, the show was nominated for a Daytime Emmy Award in the category "Outstanding Educational or Informational Series", which it won.

== Personal life ==
Roper was born on January 25, 1987 (Note: Roper, Jake (January 25, 2011). "So, my awesome girlfriend @rebeccaaaa just had a singing guerilla come and wish me a happy birthday in front of my whole office". Twitter.) and grew up in Evergreen, Colorado. He attended New York's School of Visual Arts where he received a degree in film. On November 25, 2015, Roper announced on his side channel that he had a rare form of cancer called a sarcoma. In June 2016, he announced that test readings had come back indicating that the cancer was gone.

== Filmography ==
=== Television ===
Year	Title	Role	Ref.
2017	Live with Kelly and Ryan	Himself	

== Awards and nominations ==
Year	Nominated	Work	Award	Result	Ref.
2020	47th Daytime Creative Arts Emmy Awards	Could You Survive the Movies?	Outstanding Educational or Informational Series	Won	
