= Empire (podcast) =

British podcast

- Genre: Talk
- Format: Audio podcast
- Language: English

Cast and voices
- Hosted by: William Dalrymple; Anita Anand (journalist)

Production
- Length: 30–60 minutes

Publication
- Original release: 15 August 2022

Related
- Website: empirepoduk.com

Empire is a British podcast launched on 15 August 2022. It is hosted by Anita Anand and William Dalrymple. The series is produced by Goalhanger Podcasts.

== Background ==
In 2022, Anita Anand collaborated with historian William Dalrymple to create the podcast Empire, which examines the British East India Company, British Empire, and British involvement and influence on India. The pair had previously worked together on the book Koh-i-Noor: The History of the World's Most Infamous Diamond.

Later seasons of Empire dealt with the Ottoman Empire and the Russian Empire.

== Reception ==
Rahul Dravid, the coach of the Indian national cricket team, is a fan of the podcast and has made the team listen to it as well. The Times said the podcast had an "unbeatable formula" and the "best podcast on the British Empire". The Australian described the podcast as "ambitious". Arifa Noor on the Dawn wrote "Empire is more of a meandering, leisurely walk through a historical period, with detours and gentle rests and a pace which can be brisk or slow".
