= Beme (app) =

Video messaging social network service

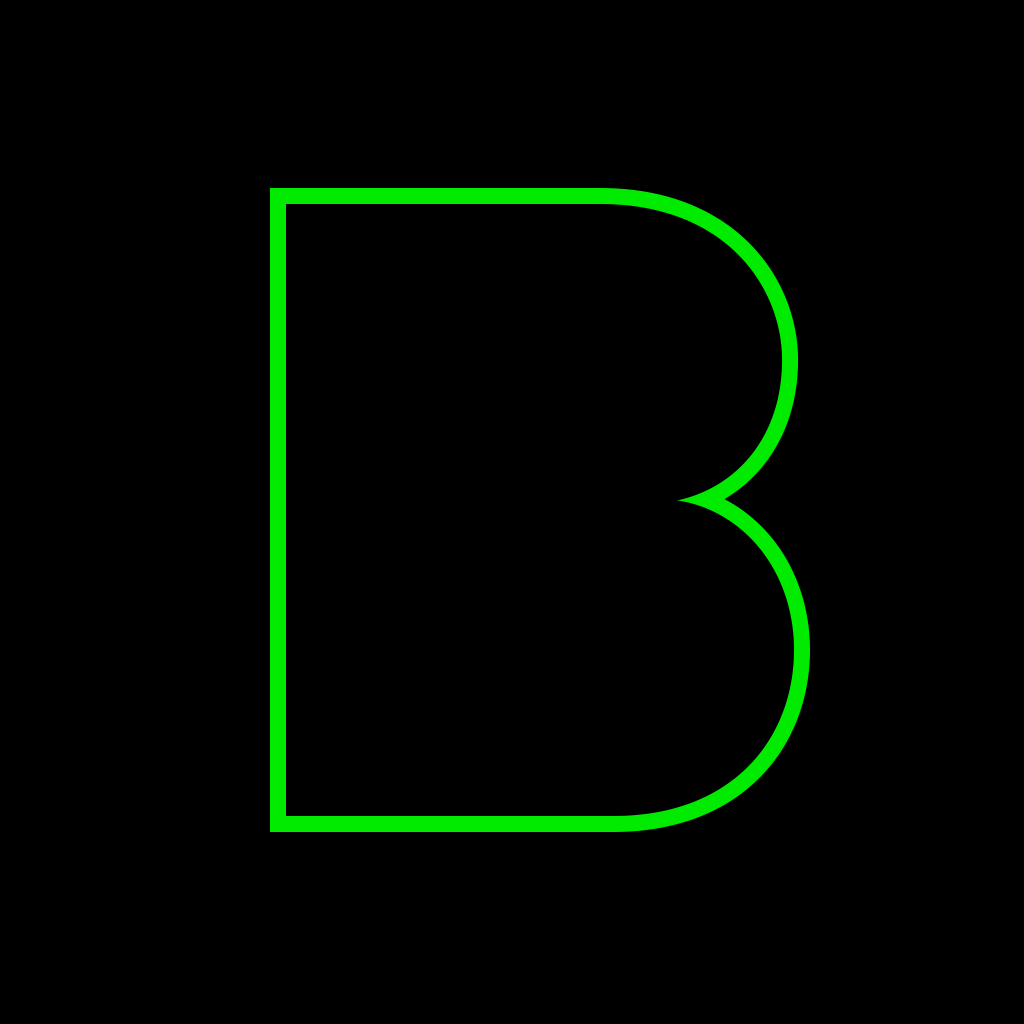
- Logo
- Developer: Beme Inc.
- Release: July 17, 2015; 11 years ago
- Final release: November 28, 2016; 9 years ago
- Operating system: iOS, Android
- Available in: English
- Type: video messaging, social networking service

Beme (/ˈbiːm/) was a mobile application created by Matt Hackett and Casey Neistat, a vlogger and short film maker on YouTube, and developed by Beme Inc. Beme was removed from the iOS' App Store and Google Play Store on January 31, 2017.

== Releases ==
The first version of Beme was launched on July 17, 2015 for iOS. On May 2, 2016, an Android version was released.

On March 25, 2016, version 0.9.0 was publicly released to the iOS App Store. The new version featured a new white and green UI as well as support for iPad and iPod touch that do not have a proximity sensor. Version 0.9.0 was the first major release featuring a brand new UI since the first public version. It also was the first version that allowed for a record time of up to 8 seconds and allowed you to stop any time while recording a beme and have it uploaded regardless of record time as long as it was between 2–8 seconds.

On May 2, 2016, version 1.0.0 was released for Android on the Google Play Store. The new version featured Beme stats in the profile, a new discovery screen to find people near and far, and allowed users to tap on Bemes to react and watch in full screen. Version 1.0.3 was released on May 3, 2016, and fixed major issues with the proximity sensor on the Android version.

On November 28, 2016, version 1.1.0 (version 1.0.26 for Android) was the last release of Beme before being discontinued and removed from the iOS App Store and Google Play Store on January 31, 2017.

=== Version history ===
Version	Release date	Notes
beme 0.3.0	July 17, 2015	Closed beta
beme 0.4.0	July 21, 2015	
beme 0.5.0	July 31, 2015	
beme 0.6.1	August 28, 2015	
beme 0.7.0	October 26, 2015	
beme 0.7.1	November 11, 2015	
beme 0.7.2	November 24, 2015	
beme 0.7.3	December 15, 2015	
beme 0.9.0	March 25, 2016	Publicly released for iOS
beme 0.9.2	April 11, 2016	
beme 1.0.0	May 2, 2016	Publicly released for Android
beme 1.0.3	May 3, 2016	
beme 1.0.5	June 16, 2016	
beme 1.0.6		
beme 1.0.7		
beme 1.0.8	July 18, 2016	
beme 1.0.9		
iOS: beme 1.1.0; Android: beme 1.0.26	November 28, 2016	Last release

== Features ==
Designed as an alternative to highly edited content found in social media, the app enables users to produce unedited 2-to-8-second videos, which are immediately uploaded and shared with the user's subscribers, without the ability to preview the video. Users respond to shared content by sending "reactions", photographs of themselves, back to the video uploader. To begin recording, users cover their phone's proximity sensor, and the video lasts until the proximity sensor is uncovered or the time limit is reached. After the app stops recording, the video is automatically shared.

In November 2016, Neistat announced another creation in association with Beme, called Exit Poll. The app followed the simple premise of asking users to share who they were voting for. The user was then asked to record a video response on why they were voting for that particular candidate. These were then collated together and shared via Facebook live during the election.

== Press ==
Shortly after the launch, BuzzFeed described Beme's minimalist design as "deceptively simple and decidedly weird". The New York Times explained that Beme's user experience is "as if the phone becomes a stand-in for one's body, the camera facing outward to capture what the user is experiencing." Within eight days of the app's release, Beme users had shared 1.1 million videos and logged 2.4 million reactions.
