= Damascus Station =

2021 spy thriller novel by David McCloskey

- Author: David McCloskey
- Language: English
- Genre: Spy fiction
- Publisher: W. W. Norton & Company
- Publication date: 2021
- Publication place: United States
- Media type: Print, E-book
- ISBN: 9780393881042

Damascus Station is a spy fiction novel by American author and former CIA officer David McCloskey. It is McCloskey's debut novel. It was released in October 2021.

== Plot ==
CIA case officer Sam Joseph is dispatched to Paris to recruit Syrian Palace official Mariam Haddad. The two fall into a forbidden relationship, which creates danger when they enter Damascus to find the man responsible for the disappearance of an American spy. The chase for the killer soon leads to a trail of high-profile assassinations and the discovery of a dark secret at the heart of the Syrian regime.

== Publication ==
The novel was published in 2021 by W. W. Norton & Company.

== Reception ==
The novel received positive reviews from critics and intelligence professionals. The Financial Times described it as "simply marvelous storytelling...a stand-out thriller and essential reading for fans of the genre". The Times said "one of the best — and most authentic — spy thrillers in years". Former CIA director David Petraeus and former Secretary of Defense Leon E. Panetta praised the book. The former MI6 Chief John Sawers recommended it for people who "want to read a good book about what life in intelligence is like"
