= Gary Lineker =

English sports broadcaster (born 1960)

Gary Lineker OBE
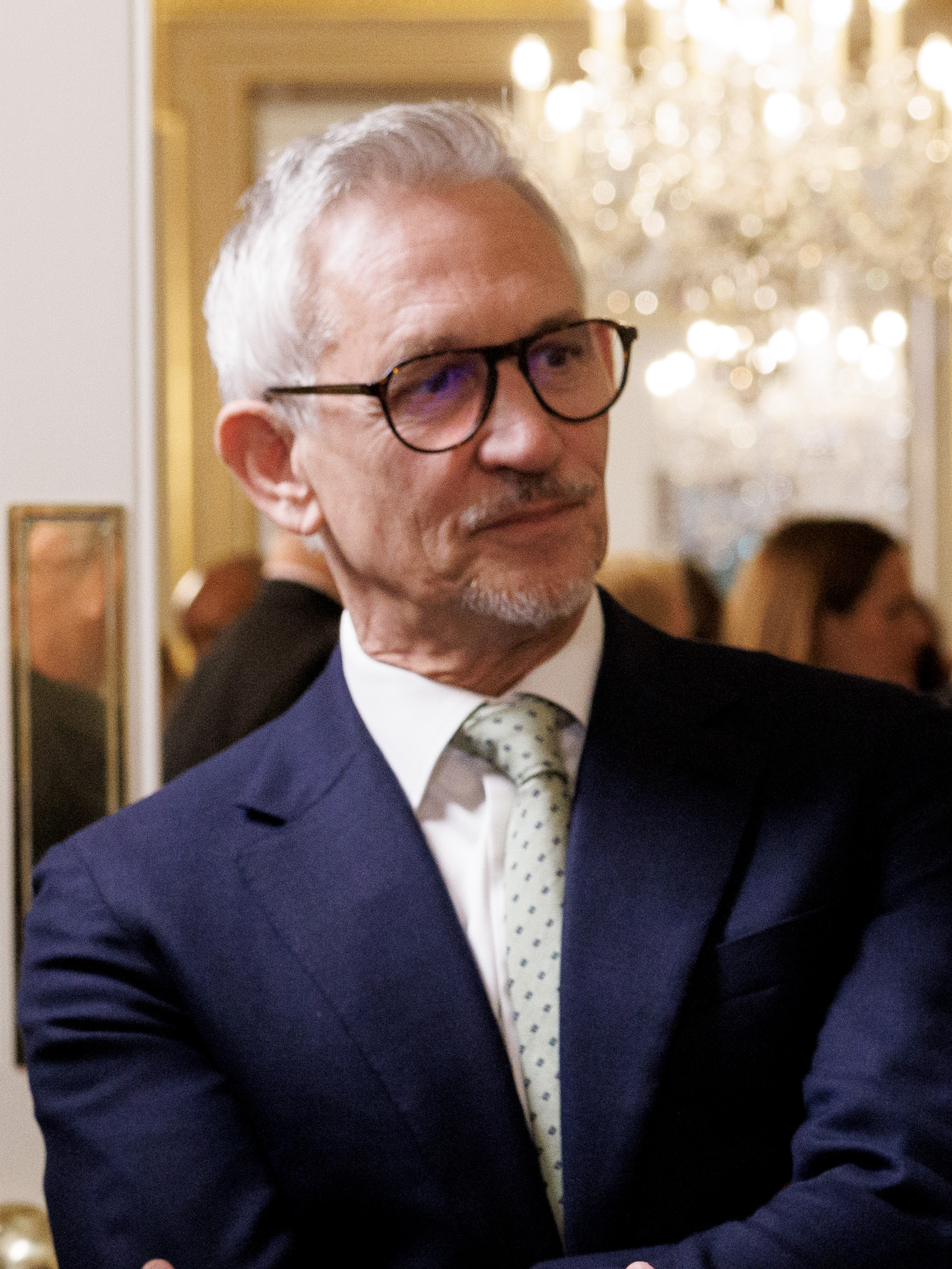
- Lineker in 2025

Personal information
- Birth name: Gary Winston Lineker
- Date of birth: 30 November 1960 (age 65)
- Place of birth: Leicester, England
- Height: 5 ft 10 in (1.77 m)
- Position: Striker

Youth career
- 1977–1978: Leicester City

Senior career*
Years	Team	Apps	(Gls)
1978–1985	Leicester City	194	(95)
1985–1986	Everton	41	(30)
1986–1989	Barcelona	103	(42)
1989–1992	Tottenham Hotspur	105	(67)
1992–1994	Nagoya Grampus	18	(4)
Total		461	(238)

International career
1984	England B	1	(0)
1984–1992	England	80	(48)
- * Club domestic league appearances and goals

Gary Winston Lineker (born 30 November 1960) is an English sports broadcaster, businessman, and former professional footballer who played as a striker. Regarded as one of the best players of his generation and one of England's greatest players, Lineker is the only player to have been the top goalscorer in England with three clubs: Leicester City, Everton, and Tottenham Hotspur. He also played for Barcelona in Spain, and won 80 caps for England.

Lineker began his football career at Leicester City in 1978, and finished as the First Division's joint top goalscorer in 1984–85. He then moved to league champions Everton, where he won both the PFA Players' Player of the Year and FWA Footballer of the Year awards in his debut season, before moving to Spanish club Barcelona, where he won the 1987–88 Copa del Rey and the 1989 European Cup Winners' Cup. He joined Tottenham Hotspur in 1989, and won his second FWA Footballer of the Year and the FA Cup, his only major trophy in English football. Lineker's final club was Nagoya Grampus Eight; he retired in 1994 after two seasons at the Japanese side.

Lineker made his England debut in 1984, earning 80 caps and scoring 48 goals over an eight-year international career, which made him England's second-highest goalscorer on his retirement. He remains England's fourth-highest scorer, behind Harry Kane, Wayne Rooney and Bobby Charlton, and his goals-to-games ratio remains one of the best for the country. His six goals in the 1986 World Cup made him the tournament's top scorer, receiving the Golden Boot, and he came second in the 1986 Ballon d'Or. Lineker was again integral to England's progress to the semi-finals of the 1990 World Cup, scoring another four goals.

Lineker never received a yellow or red card during his career, and he also never won a top-flight league title. He was honoured in 1990 with the FIFA Fair Play Award. In a senior career which spanned 16 years and 654 competitive games, Lineker scored a total of 331 goals, including 283 goals at club level. After his retirement from football he was inducted into the English Football Hall of Fame. A keen supporter of Leicester City, he led a consortium in 2002 that invested in his old club, saving it from bankruptcy, and was appointed honorary vice-president.

Lineker's media career began with the BBC, where he presented the flagship football programme Match of the Day from 1999 until 2025, the longest tenure of any MOTD presenter. He was also the BBC's lead presenter for live football matches, including coverage of international tournaments such as the FIFA World Cup. He has also worked for Al Jazeera Sports, Eredivisie Live, NBC Sports Network, and BT Sport's coverage of the UEFA Champions League. In 2018, he cofounded Goalhanger, a media company that primarily produces podcasts, notably several under "The Rest is..." brand.

== Early life ==
Gary Winston Lineker was born on 30 November 1960 in Leicester, the son of Margaret P. (Abbs) and Barry Lineker. He was given his middle name in honour of Winston Churchill, with whom he shares a birthday. He has one brother, Wayne, who is two years his junior. Lineker grew up with his family in the city, living first in Braunstone before moving to Knighton, playing football with Wayne. Their father was a greengrocer, as were their grandfather William and great-grandfather George, in Leicester. Barry Lineker ran Lineker's fruit and veg stall in Leicester Market, and as a child and a young player Gary regularly helped out on the stall. Lineker, who is white, received racial abuse as a child for his dark features.

Lineker first attended Caldecote Road School (Caldecote Juniors), Braunstone in Leicester (east of the Meridian Centre). He then went to the City of Leicester Boys' Grammar School (now City of Leicester College) on Downing Drive in Evington, owing to his preference for football rather than rugby, which was the main sport of most schools near his home. Lineker was equally talented at both football and cricket. From the ages of 11 to 16 he captained the Leicestershire Schools cricket team, and had felt that he had a higher chance of succeeding at it rather than football. He later stated on They Think It's All Over that as a teenager he idolised former England captain David Gower, who was playing for Leicestershire at the time. During his youth he played for Aylestone Park Youth, later becoming the club's president.

Lineker left school with four O Levels. One of his teachers wrote on his report card that he "concentrates too much on football" and that he would "never make a living at that". He then joined the youth academy at Leicester City in 1976.

== Club career ==
=== Leicester City ===
Lineker began his career at his hometown club Leicester City after leaving school in 1977, turning professional in the 1978–79 season and making his senior debut on New Year's Day 1979 in a 2–0 win at Filbert Street over Oldham Athletic in the Second Division. He earned a Second Division title medal a year later with 19 appearances, but played just nine league games in 1980–81 as Leicester were relegated.

Lineker became a regular player in 1981–82, scoring 19 goals in all competitions that season. Although Leicester missed out on promotion, they reached the semi-finals of the FA Cup, and clinched promotion a year later as Lineker scored 26 times in the Second Division. In 1983–84, he enjoyed regular First Division action for the first time and was the division's second-highest scorer with 22 goals, although Leicester finished in 15th place. He was the First Division's joint top scorer in 1984–85 with 24 goals, and enjoyed a prolific partnership with Alan Smith.

=== Everton ===
In the 1985 close season, defending league champions Everton signed Lineker for £800,000; he scored 40 goals in 57 games for his new team in the 1985–86 season. Lineker's first game for Everton happened to be away to Leicester City; at half time, he walked into the Leicester dressing room by mistake. He was again the First Division's leading goalscorer, this time with 30 goals (including three hat-tricks), and helped Everton finish second in the league. While at Everton, they reached the FA Cup final for the third consecutive year but lost 3–1 to Liverpool, despite Lineker giving them an early lead when he outpaced Alan Hansen to score. Liverpool had also pipped Everton to the title by two points.

Lineker scored three hat-tricks for Everton; at home to Birmingham City in a 4–1 league win on 31 August 1985, at home to Manchester City in a 4–0 win on 11 February 1986, and then in the penultimate league game of the season on 3 May 1986, when they kept their title hopes alive with a 6–1 home win over Southampton. On his final league appearance, he scored twice in a 3–1 home win over West Ham United. Lineker and his Everton colleagues were denied title glory as Liverpool also won their final league game of the season at Chelsea. Lineker later said in 2008 that this Everton team was the best club side he ever played in, stating: "I was only on Merseyside a short time, nine or 10 months in total really, but it was still a happy time personally, while professionally it was one of the most successful periods of my career. I still have an affinity towards Everton."

=== Barcelona ===
After winning the Golden Boot at the 1986 World Cup in Mexico there were many courters for Lineker across Europe. Barcelona at the time were managed by fellow Englishman Terry Venables, who had arrived in 1984, and who had already brought in Scottish striker Steve Archibald to great effect, and was to also bring in Manchester United and Wales striker Mark Hughes. Lineker was signed by Barcelona for £2.8 million. Barcelona would give Lineker his first chance of European football, as Leicester had never qualified for Europe while he played for them, and Everton were denied a place in the European Cup for 1985–86 due to the ban on English clubs in European competitions following the Heysel disaster.

Barcelona had won the 1984–85 La Liga title in Venables' first season at the club, and the 1986 Copa de la Liga the following season but had lost two other finals, so there was great anticipation of success at the Camp Nou for Lineker. He made his Barcelona debut against Racing Santander, scoring twice. Barcelona led the league for much of the 1986–87 season, until a pair of losses against Real Zaragoza and Sporting Gijon gave advantage to Real Madrid. Two further losses to the same team cemented Barcelona's second place finish. Lineker ultimately had scored 20 goals in 40 league games during his first season, including a hat-trick in a 3–2 win over archrivals Real Madrid to make him somewhat of a cult hero. However the club had crashed out of the Copa del Rey at the first hurdle, and suffered a shock defeat to Dundee United in the quarter-final of the 1986–87 UEFA Cup.

For the 1987–88 season hopes were still high for the club, but following three consecutive losses at the start of the season Terry Venables was dismissed and Luis Aragonés brought in to replace him as manager. Lineker's form remained strong, and he scored twice against Real Madrid in a 4–1 win in December. He finished the season with 16 goals in 35 league games as the club finished 6th. The club won the 1988 Copa del Rey, but were eliminated in the quarter-final of the UEFA Cup.

In the summer, the club endured a tumultuous off season that culminated in the "Hesperia Mutiny" that saw a large number of players and coaches fired after protesting pay and conditions at the club. In the aftermath Barcelona moved to sign former player for the club during their last most successful era, and current Ajax manager Johan Cruyff. The club set about rebuilding its team, retaining only a skeleton of the squad that had finished the 1987–88 season in 6th place – including Lineker. The impact of Cruyff was immediate. Barcelona became a much more attacking side, and finished the season 1988–89 season in a much improved second place. However Lineker lost his favoured position at centre forward to new signing Julio Salinas, and saw himself pushed out wide right for most of the season resulting in both the lowest goal output (6) and appearances (26) in the league of Lineker's career as a starter. The club won 1989 European Cup Winners' Cup final where Lineker fared better than previous seasons, scoring four times in 8 outings.

As the season came to an end, Barcelona was seeking to raise much needed funds for Cruyff and to free up the "foreigner" spot in the squad to continue his rebuilding project at the club, while Lineker was desperate to find first team opportunities in his favoured position.

With 42 goals in 103 La Liga appearances, Lineker had become the highest scoring British player in the competition's history, this was later surpassed by Gareth Bale in March 2016.

=== Tottenham Hotspur ===
Manchester United manager Alex Ferguson attempted to sign Lineker to partner his ex-Barcelona teammate Mark Hughes in attack, but Lineker instead signed for Tottenham Hotspur in July 1989 for £1.1 million. Over three seasons, he scored 67 goals in 105 league games and won the FA Cup while playing for the club. He finished as top scorer in the First Division in the 1989–90 season, scoring 24 goals as Spurs finished third.

Lineker finally collected an English trophy when he won the 1991 FA Cup final with Spurs, who beat Nottingham Forest 2–1. This was despite Lineker having a goal controversially disallowed for offside and also having a penalty saved by goalkeeper Mark Crossley. Lineker had contributed to Tottenham's run to the final. In the semi-final he scored twice in a 3–1 win over North London rivals Arsenal.

Lineker was the top division's second-highest goalscorer in 1991–92 with 28 goals from 35 games, behind Ian Wright, who scored 29 times in 42 games. Despite Lineker's personal performance, Tottenham finished this final pre-Premier League season in 15th place. His last goal in English football came on the last day of the season in a 3–1 defeat to Manchester United at Old Trafford.

=== Nagoya Grampus Eight ===
In November 1991, Lineker accepted an offer of a two-year contract from J1 League club Nagoya Grampus Eight. The transfer fee paid to Tottenham Hotspur was £2 million. He officially joined Nagoya Grampus Eight after playing his final game for Spurs on 2 May 1992, when he scored the consolation goal in a 3–1 defeat by Manchester United on the last day of the season. Shortly before accepting the offer from Nagoya Grampus Eight, Tottenham had rejected an offer from ambitious Second Division club Blackburn Rovers, who had recently been taken over by steel baron Jack Walker.

Having scored nine goals in 23 appearances over two injury-impacted seasons for Nagoya Grampus Eight, he announced his retirement from playing in September 1994. The English national media had previously reported that he would be returning to England to complete his playing career at Middlesbrough or Southampton.

== International career ==
Lineker was capped once by the England B national team, playing in a 2–0 home win over New Zealand's B team on 13 November 1984. He first played for the full England team against Scotland in 1984. He played five games in the 1986 World Cup and was top scorer of the tournament with six goals, winning the Golden Boot, making him the first English player to have done so. He scored the second quickest hat-trick ever at a FIFA World Cup tournament against Poland, the second English player to score a hat-trick at a World Cup, and scored two goals against Paraguay in the second round. He played most of the tournament wearing a lightweight cast on his forearm. He scored for England in the World Cup quarter-final against Argentina, but the game ended in defeat as Diego Maradona scored twice for the opposition (the first goal being the "Hand of God" handball, and the second being the "Goal of the Century"). In 1988, Lineker played in Euro 88, but failed to score as England lost all three Group games. It was later established that he had been suffering from hepatitis.

In the 1990 World Cup, he scored four goals to help England reach the semi-finals. He was unwell during the tournament, and accidentally defecated in his shorts during the opening group game against the Republic of Ireland. After Andreas Brehme sent England 1–0 down in the semi-final, Lineker received a pass from Paul Parker and escaped two West German defenders on his way to scoring the equaliser, but the West Germans triumphed in the penalty shoot-out and went on to win the trophy. Later he said: "Football is a simple game; 22 men chase a ball for 90 minutes and at the end, the Germans win." Lineker's equaliser appears in the popular England national team anthem, "Three Lions", with the lyric "When Lineker scored".

He retired from international football with eighty caps and 48 goals, one fewer goal than Sir Bobby Charlton's England record (which Charlton accrued over 106 caps). In what proved to be his last England match, against Sweden at Euro 92, he was substituted by England coach Graham Taylor in favour of Arsenal striker Alan Smith, ultimately denying him the chance to equal — or even better — Charlton's record. He had earlier missed a penalty that would have brought him level, in a pre-tournament friendly against Brazil. He was visibly upset at the decision, not looking at Taylor as he took the bench.

He scored four goals in an England match on two occasions and is one of very few players never to have been given a yellow card or a red card in any type of game.

== Media career ==
=== Sports presenting ===
Following retirement from professional football, Lineker developed a career in the media, initially on the BBC for Radio 5 Live and as a football pundit. He appeared as a team captain on the sports game show They Think It's All Over from 1995 to 2003. He also presented Grandstand in the London studio while presenter Des Lynam was in Aintree when the Grand National was abandoned because of a bomb alert at the racecourse in 1997. In 1999, he replaced Lynam as the BBC's lead presenter for football coverage, including its flagship football television programme Match of the Day, becoming BBC Sport's highest paid presenter. Following the departure of Steve Rider from the BBC in 2005, Lineker, who is a keen recreational golfer with a handicap of four, became the new presenter for the corporation's golf coverage. Despite receiving some criticism from his peers, he continued to front the BBC's coverage of the Masters and The Open.

In 2005, Lineker was sued for defamation by Australian footballer Harry Kewell over comments Lineker had made writing in his column in The Sunday Telegraph about Kewell's transfer from Leeds United to Liverpool. However, the jury was unable to reach a verdict. It became known during the case that the article had actually been ghost-written by a journalist at The Sunday Telegraph following a telephone interview with Lineker.

In May 2010, Lineker resigned from his role as columnist for The Mail on Sunday in protest over the sting operation against Lord Triesman that reportedly jeopardised England's bid to host the 2018 World Cup. Triesman resigned as chairman of the bid and the FA on 16 May 2010 after the publication of a secret recording of a conversation between the peer and a former ministerial aide, during which he claimed that Spain and Russia were planning to bribe referees at the World Cup in South Africa. Lineker then began working as an anchor for the English language football coverage for Al Jazeera Sport, which is broadcast throughout most of the Middle East. He left the Qatar-based network in 2012.

Lineker was the lead presenter of the BBC's coverage of the London 2012 Olympic Games, presenting the evening action each day. This was a role he also took for the Glasgow 2014 Commonwealth Games.

In 2013, Lineker began working for NBCSN as part of their Premier League coverage and contributing to the US version of Match of the Day. On 9 June 2015, Lineker was unveiled as the lead presenter of BT Sport's Champions League coverage. On 13 August 2016, Lineker presented the first Match of the Day of the 2016–17 season wearing only boxer shorts. Believing it would simply not happen, he had promised in a tweet from December 2015 that if Leicester City won the Premier League, he would "present Match of the Day in just my undies".

In March 2023, Lineker was required to step back from presenting on the BBC for three days due to a controversy over his criticism of the British government's immigration policy on Twitter.

As of July 2025, Lineker was the highest-paid BBC presenter, and had been for eight years running, receiving payments of £1.75–1.76 million each year between 2016 and 2020, approximately £1.35 million in 2020–21, and between £1,350,000 - £1,354,999 in 2024–25. His pay has been criticised by Julian Knight, chair of the parliamentary Digital, Culture, Media and Sport Committee, and former BBC presenter Esther Rantzen. The BBC's Director General, Tim Davie, stated that Lineker's pay was justified "because of the value of analysis to the viewing audience".

Lineker was confirmed as the host of a Netflix darts show Beat Luke Littler in August 2026.

==== BBC exit ====
On 11 November 2024, it was announced that Lineker would be stepping down from presenting Match of the Day following the conclusion of the 2024–25 Premier League season in May 2025. Having been previously announced as leaving the BBC after covering the 2025–26 FA Cup and the 2026 World Cup, in May 2025 it was announced that Lineker would leave the BBC completely at the end of the season following further controversy regarding his usage of social media, including sharing a post about Zionism that included an illustration of a rat, historically used as an antisemitic insult. Lineker said he did not see the image, and "would never consciously repost anything antisemitic" and added: "However, I recognise the error and upset that I caused, and reiterate how sorry I am. Stepping back now feels like the responsible course of action." He presented his final Match of the Day on 25 May 2025.

=== Walkers advertisements ===
Lineker has appeared in television advertisements for the Leicester-based snack company Walkers. Originally signing a £200,000 deal in 1994, his first advertisement was 1995's "Welcome Home" (Lineker had recently returned to England having played in Japan). Walkers temporarily named their salt and vinegar crisps after Lineker, labelling them 'Salt & Lineker', in the late 1990s. In 2000, Lineker's Walkers advertisements were ranked ninth in Channel 4's poll of The 100 Greatest TV Ads.

=== Other media appearances ===
In the 1980s, Gremlin Graphics released three computer games bearing Lineker's name: Gary Lineker's Superstar Soccer, Gary Lineker's Superskills and Gary Lineker's Hot Shot! (released in Germany as Litti's Hot Shot!).

Lineker participated in Prince Edward's charity television special The Grand Knockout Tournament in 1987. He also appeared in the 1991 play An Evening with Gary Lineker by Arthur Smith and Chris England, which was adapted for television in 1994. He presented a seven-part TV series for the BBC in 1998 (directed by Lloyd Stanton) called Gary Lineker's Golden Boots, with other football celebrities. It was an extensive history of the World Cup focusing on the 'Golden Boots' (top scorers).

In 2006, Lineker took on an acting role as the voice of Underground Ernie on the BBC's children's channel, CBeebies. In December 2008, Lineker appeared on the ITV1 television programme Who Wants to Be a Millionaire? where he and English rugby union player Austin Healey won £50,000 for the Nicholls Spinal Injury Foundation. In 2009, Lineker and his wife Danielle hosted a series of the BBC's Northern Exposure, following on from Laurence Llewelyn-Bowen from the previous year in visiting and showcasing locations throughout Northern Ireland.

Lineker has made a number of cameo appearances in TV shows and movies, such as the 2002 film Bend It Like Beckham, the 2014 BBC TV film Marvellous, and a number of appearances in the Apple TV+ football comedy TV series Ted Lasso. In 2013, Lineker participated in the genealogical programme Who Do You Think You Are? during which he discovered an ancestor who was a poacher, and another who was a legal clerk. In 2021, Lineker started hosting the ITV game show Sitting on a Fortune.

=== Goalhanger Films and Podcasts ===
In May 2014, Lineker established his own production company Goalhanger Films Ltd. with former ITV Controller Tony Pastor. During the 2014 FIFA World Cup, Lineker presented several short videos produced by Goalhanger Films on YouTube with the title Blahzil. In May 2015, the company produced a 60-minute-long documentary presented by Lineker titled Gary Lineker on the Road to FA Cup Glory for the BBC.

He is a cofounder of Goalhanger Podcasts, which produces several podcasts under "The Rest is..." branding including The Rest is History, The Rest is Politics and Lineker's own podcast, The Rest Is Football, which he hosts with Alan Shearer and Micah Richards. Goalhanger was named the UK's fastest growing business in 2026, a year when it also entered into venture capital focused on developing UK media companies.

In December 2025, Lineker signed an agreement with Netflix to cover the 2026 FIFA World Cup on his podcast The Rest is Football. After the World Cup, Netflix renewed the podcast to focus on the 2026–27 Premier League season.

=== Baller League UK ===
In November 2024, it was announced that Lineker would manage one of the 12 teams in the Baller League UK, a six-a-side football league.

== Personal life ==
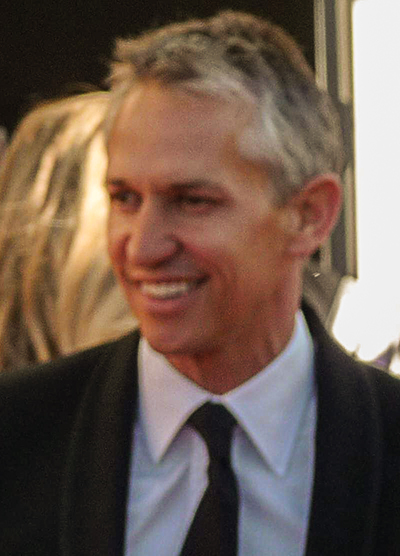
Lineker in 2009

Lineker married Michelle Cockayne in July 1986, in Knighton, Leicester. They have four sons. In May 2006, Cockayne filed for divorce on the grounds of Lineker's alleged "unreasonable behaviour", with documents submitted to the court claiming that his actions in their marriage had caused her "stress and anxiety". The couple subsequently stated that the situation was amicable.

In November 1991, Lineker's eldest son survived a rare form of leukaemia whilst he was a baby, and was treated at Great Ormond Street Hospital in London. Lineker now supports children's cancer charity CLIC Sargent and has appeared in promotional clips encouraging people to give blood. Lineker has been actively involved with other cancer charities such as Leukaemia Busters, where between 1994 and 2005 Gary and Michelle were the charity's patrons. He has also been involved with the Fight for Life and Cancer Research UK charities.

Lineker was made a freeman of the City of Leicester in 1995 and he has been referred to as "Leicester's favourite son".

In October 2002, Lineker backed a £5 million bid to rescue his former club Leicester City, which had recently gone into administration, describing his involvement as "charity" rather than an "ego trip". He stated that he would invest a six-figure sum and that other members of his consortium would invest a similar amount. Lineker met with fans' groups to persuade them to try and raise money to rescue his former club. The club was eventually saved from liquidation. He is now honorary Vice President of Leicester City.

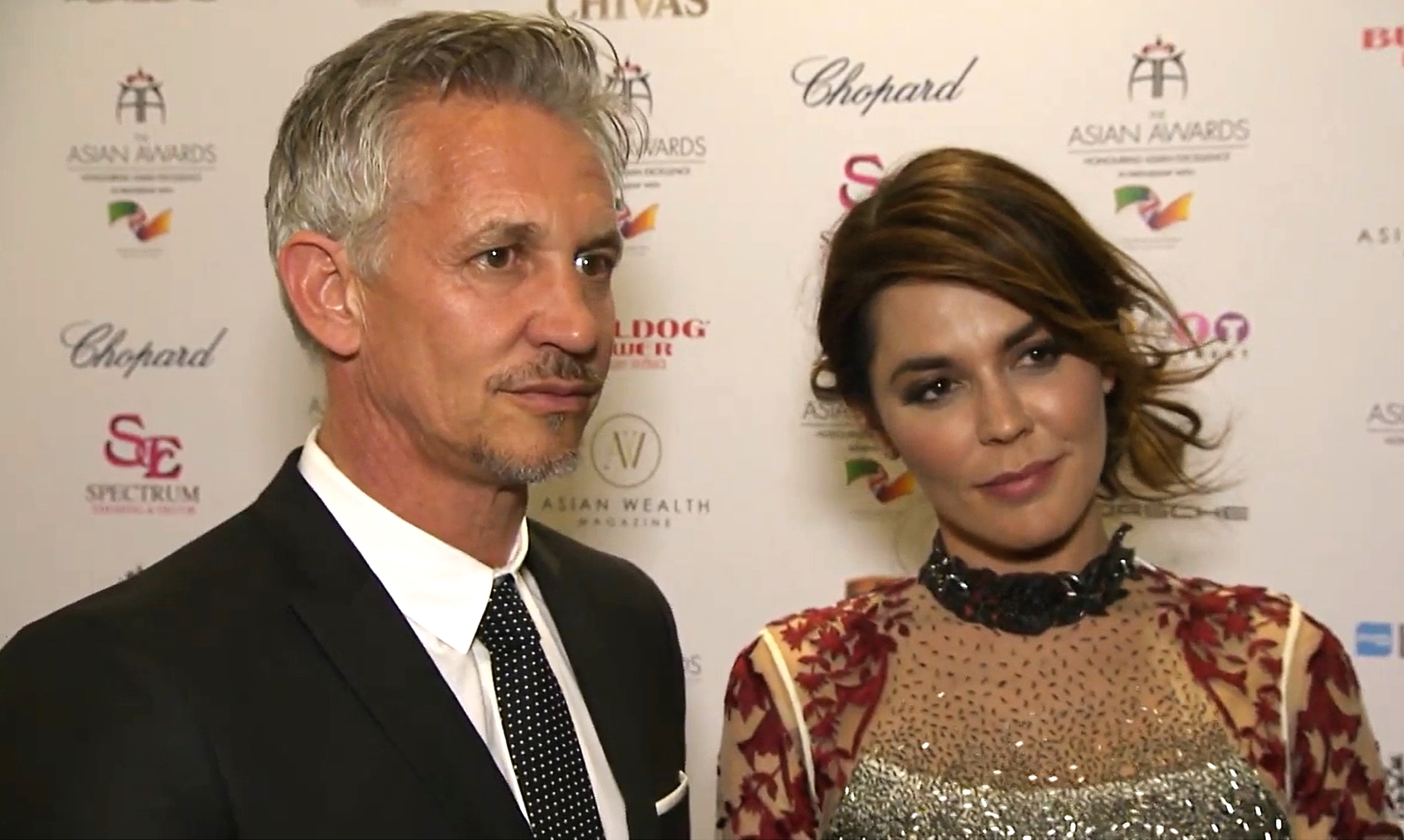
Gary and Danielle Lineker at The Asian Awards in 2015

Lineker married Danielle Bux on 2 September 2009, in Ravello, Italy. On 13 January 2016, Lineker and Bux announced they were divorcing, after six years of marriage, the reason given being Gary not wanting more children.

Lineker lives in Barnes, London.

In 1985, Lineker was best man at snooker player Willie Thorne's wedding and their close friendship was the subject of the VHS production, Best of Friends – The Official Story of Gary Lineker & Willie Thorne.

In November 2017, Lineker was named in the Paradise Papers in connection with a tax avoidance scheme relating to property owned in Barbados and a company set up in the British Virgin Islands.

Lineker speaks fluent Spanish, which he learnt during his time playing for FC Barcelona, and is an advocate for the teaching of foreign languages in schools.

In April 2020, during the COVID-19 pandemic, Lineker announced that he was donating £140,000 to the British Red Cross towards research into the virus.

On 28 March 2023, he won an appeal against HM Revenue and Customs (HMRC) over a bill that totalled £4.9 million. HMRC had pursued him over taxes on income from the BBC and BT Sport, from 2013–14 to 2017–18, on the grounds he was an employee of both organisations at the time. A judge ruled he was a freelancer and had contracts with both broadcasters.

=== Political views ===
Lineker has been noted for political views which he shares on Twitter. In December 2016, he was described by Angus Harrison of Vice News as "the British Left's Loudest Voice" for being "both staunchly liberal and resolutely unafraid of making his views known". Using a football analogy, Lineker defined his ideological position as "I make more runs to the left than the right, but never felt comfortable on the wing". After the 2017 United Kingdom general election, in which Theresa May led the Conservatives and Jeremy Corbyn led Labour, Lineker wrote "Anyone else feel politically homeless? Everything seems far right or way left. Something sensibly centrist might appeal?"

Lineker endorsed a Remain vote in the 2016 United Kingdom European Union membership referendum. In July 2018, he announced his support for People's Vote, a campaign group calling for a public vote on the final Brexit deal between the UK and the European Union (EU).

On 18 October 2016, Lineker tweeted a rebuttal to a statement made by MP David Davies where Davies suggested refugees entering the UK should undergo dental checks to verify their age: "The treatment by some towards these young refugees is hideously racist and utterly heartless. What's happening to our country?" This led The Sun to call for Lineker's sacking from Match of the Day, accusing him of breaching BBC impartiality guidelines.

In December 2018, Lineker was criticised by the BBC's cricket correspondent Jonathan Agnew for expressing his political views on Twitter. Agnew said, "You are the face of BBC Sport. Please observe BBC editorial guidelines and keep your political views, whatever they are and whatever the subject, to yourself. I'd be sacked if I followed your example." A BBC spokesperson said, "Gary is not involved in any news or political output for the BBC and as such, any expression of his personal political views does not affect the BBC's impartiality."

In October 2022, a complaint about a tweet from Lineker that referred to donations to the Conservative Party was upheld by the BBC, on the grounds that it breached social media use guidelines and failed to meet editorial standards of impartiality. During the 2022 World Cup, Qatari lawyer Hassan Al-Thawadi criticised Lineker for covering human rights violations in Qatar by stating that he did not talk about such issues with other host countries. In response, Lineker countered on The News Agents podcast that he covered issues in other host countries, and characterised the United States, one of the countries co-hosting the 2026 World Cup, as an "extraordinarily racist country". His statements on the United States were criticised by Culture Secretary Michelle Donelan in January 2023, who said they were "very derogatory questionable comments".

In July 2026, Lineker was among 120 people who wrote an open letter, organised by Patriotic Millionaires, to Prime Minister Andy Burnham, in which they asked to be taxed more.

In August 2026, Lineker reposted on Instagram a video of Jewish anti-Zionist activist Tony Greenstein speaking outside Kingston Crown Court after being acquitted of inviting support for Hamas. In the video, Greenstein described Zionism as being "in the tradition of the Nazis who persecuted Jews". The video was originally posted by Cage International, designated as an Islamic extremist group in the House of Commons in 2024. The Telegraph criticised Lineker's posting. In a later interview he said he continued to speak about issues such as Gaza because "if I see things that upset me in humanitarian terms, then I find it quite upsetting, and it triggers me to use a platform that I would never have had before".

==== BBC exit ====
In March 2023, Lineker criticised the British government's asylum policy via Twitter. Commenting on a video message by the Home Secretary, Suella Braverman, about stopping migrants crossing the English Channel in small boats, he said the message was "beyond awful" and called the government's policy "an immeasurably cruel policy directed at the most vulnerable people in language that is not dissimilar to that used by Germany in the 30s". The comments received condemnation from some Conservative politicians, including Braverman herself, and a spokesperson for Labour leader Keir Starmer said comparisons with 1930s Germany "aren't always the best way" to make an argument. Lineker received support from other political figures, including Baron Dubs, Alastair Campbell, and Angela Rayner. A BBC source said the corporation was taking the matter "seriously" and expected to have a "frank conversation" with Lineker. The BBC's culture and media editor Katie Razzall wrote, "As the UK's most scrutinised media organisation in increasingly polarised times, to say Gary Lineker's recent tweets cause difficulty for the BBC is an understatement." Lineker said he stood by his comments and did not fear suspension from his BBC work.

On 10 March, the BBC said Lineker would step back from his job on Match of the Day because it considered "his recent social media activity to be a breach of our guidelines". It added it had "decided Lineker will not present Match of the Day until there's an agreed and clear position on his use of social media". Lineker's BBC Sport colleagues Ian Wright, Alan Shearer, Steve Wilson, Conor McNamara, Robyn Cowen, Steven Wyeth, Alex Scott, Jason Mohammad, Mark Chapman, Jermaine Jenas, Dion Dublin and Jermain Defoe all pulled out of their respective roles in BBC programmes in the next hours in solidarity with him. As a result, the broadcaster was forced to reduce its sports-related schedules for 11 and 12 March, with Match of the Day going ahead without any hosts or studio presentation, thus featuring only match footage. It also affected the BBC World Service's English-language programme Sportsworld, which was not aired on that day and was instead replaced with alternative programming. The BBC and Lineker issued coordinated statements on 13 March. Lineker's suspension was ended and the BBC announced it would initiate an independent review of its social media guidelines and how they apply to freelancers outside news. The BBC's director-general, Tim Davie, stated that Lineker had agreed to abide by the corporation's editorial guidelines until the review into them has been completed.

Since the controversy, Lineker has continued to use Twitter to comment on political issues. On 21 November 2023, he tweeted: "Worth 13 minutes of anyone's time." The tweet was accompanied by a link to an interview between Owen Jones and Raz Segal, in which Segal stated that Israel's actions in the Gaza war were "a textbook case of genocide". Lineker's tweet was interpreted by some to be an endorsement of Segal's views.

In December 2023, Lineker signed an open letter criticising the government's proposal to send asylum seekers to Rwanda. Defence Secretary Grant Shapps, Conservative Party deputy chairman Lee Anderson, and Jonathan Gullis accused him of violating impartiality and lodged a complaint with the BBC.

In May 2025, Lineker apologised after sharing a post from the group Palestine Lobby which featured criticisms of Zionism and an image of a rat. Shortly after, it was announced that Lineker would leave the BBC that month.

== Career statistics ==
=== Club ===
Appearances and goals by club, season and competition
Club	Season	League			National cup (Note: Includes FA Cup, Copa del Rey, Emperor's Cup)		League cup (Note: Includes Football League Cup, J.League Cup)		Continental		Other		Total	
Club	Season	Division	Apps	Goals	Apps	Goals	Apps	Goals	Apps	Goals	Apps	Goals	Apps	Goals
Leicester City	1978–79	Second Division	7	1	—		—		—		—		7	1
Leicester City	1979–80	Second Division	19	3	1	0	—		—		—		20	3
Leicester City	1980–81	First Division	9	2	1	1	—		—		—		10	3
Leicester City	1981–82	Second Division	39	17	5	2	3	0	—		—		47	19
Leicester City	1982–83	Second Division	40	26	1	0	2	0	—		—		43	26
Leicester City	1983–84	First Division	39	22	1	0	1	0	—		—		41	22
Leicester City	1984–85	First Division	41	24	4	3	3	2	—		—		48	29
Leicester City	Total		194	95	13	6	9	2	—		—		216	103
Everton	1985–86	First Division	41	30	6	5	5	3	—		5 (Note: One appearance in FA Charity Shield, four appearances and two goals in Football League Super Cup)	2	57	40
Barcelona	1986–87	La Liga	41	20	1	1	—		8 (Note: Appearances in UEFA Cup)	0	—		50	21
Barcelona	1987–88	La Liga	36	16	5	2	—		8	2	—		49	20
Barcelona	1988–89	La Liga	26	6	4	1	—		8 (Note: Appearances in UEFA Cup Winners' Cup)	4	1 (Note: Appearance in Supercopa de España)	0	38	11
Barcelona	Total		103	42	10	4	—		24	6	1	0	138	52
Tottenham Hotspur	1989–90	First Division	38	24	1	0	6	2	—		—		45	26
Tottenham Hotspur	1990–91	First Division	32	15	6	3	5	1	—		—		43	19
Tottenham Hotspur	1991–92	First Division	35	28	2	0	4	5	8	2	1 (Note: Appearance in FA Charity Shield)	0	50	35
Tottenham Hotspur	Total		105	67	9	3	15	8	8	2	1	0	138	80
Nagoya Grampus Eight	1993	J League	7	1	0	0	5	4	—		—		12	5
Nagoya Grampus Eight	1994	J League	11	3	0	0	1	0	—		—		12	3
Nagoya Grampus Eight	Total		18	4	0	0	6	4	—		—		24	8
Total			461	238	38	18	35	17	32	8	7	2	573	283

=== International ===
Appearances and goals by national team and year
National team	Year	Apps	Goals
England	1984	1	0
England	1985	9	6
England	1986	10	8
England	1987	7	9
England	1988	10	3
England	1989	9	3
England	1990	15	8
England	1991	11	9
England	1992	8	2
Total		80	48

Lineker earned his first cap for England in 1984 against Scotland during the 1983–84 British Home Championship. He played his last game for England in a 2–1 loss against Sweden in a Euro 1992 group stage match. He almost equalled the England goalscoring record, held at the time by Bobby Charlton, in a pre-tournament friendly against Brazil, but he missed a penalty kick, leaving him one goal short of Charlton's total, which was overtaken by Wayne Rooney in 2015.

Scores and results list England's goal tally first, score column indicates score after each Lineker goal.

List of international goals scored by Gary Lineker
No.	Date	Venue	Cap	Opponent	Score	Result	Competition	Ref.
1	26 March 1985	Wembley Stadium, London, England	2	Republic of Ireland	2–1	2–1	Friendly	
2	16 June 1985	Los Angeles Memorial Coliseum, Los Angeles, United States	7	United States	1–0	5–0	Friendly	
3	16 June 1985	Los Angeles Memorial Coliseum, Los Angeles, United States	7	United States	3–0	5–0	Friendly	
4	16 October 1985	Wembley Stadium, London, England	9	Turkey	2–0	5–0	1986 FIFA World Cup qualification	
5	16 October 1985	Wembley Stadium, London, England	9	Turkey	4–0	5–0	1986 FIFA World Cup qualification	
6	16 October 1985	Wembley Stadium, London, England	9	Turkey	5–0	5–0	1986 FIFA World Cup qualification	
7	11 June 1986	Estadio Tecnológico, Monterrey, Mexico	16	Poland	1–0	3–0	1986 FIFA World Cup	
8	11 June 1986	Estadio Tecnológico, Monterrey, Mexico	16	Poland	2–0	3–0	1986 FIFA World Cup	
9	11 June 1986	Estadio Tecnológico, Monterrey, Mexico	16	Poland	3–0	3–0	1986 FIFA World Cup	
10	18 June 1986	Estadio Azteca, Mexico City, Mexico	17	Paraguay	1–0	3–0	1986 FIFA World Cup	
11	18 June 1986	Estadio Azteca, Mexico City, Mexico	17	Paraguay	3–0	3–0	1986 FIFA World Cup	
12	22 June 1986	Estadio Azteca, Mexico City, Mexico	18	Argentina	1–2	1–2	1986 FIFA World Cup	
13	15 October 1986	Wembley Stadium, London, England	19	Northern Ireland	1–0	3–0	UEFA Euro 1988 qualification	
14	15 October 1986	Wembley Stadium, London, England	19	Northern Ireland	3–0	3–0	UEFA Euro 1988 qualification	
15	18 February 1987	Santiago Bernabéu Stadium, Madrid, Spain	21	Spain	1–1	4–2	Friendly	
16	18 February 1987	Santiago Bernabéu Stadium, Madrid, Spain	21	Spain	2–1	4–2	Friendly	
17	18 February 1987	Santiago Bernabéu Stadium, Madrid, Spain	21	Spain	3–1	4–2	Friendly	
18	18 February 1987	Santiago Bernabéu Stadium, Madrid, Spain	21	Spain	4–1	4–2	Friendly	
19	19 May 1987	Wembley Stadium, London, England	24	Brazil	1–1	1–1	1987 Rous Cup	
20	9 September 1987	Rheinstadion, Düsseldorf, Germany	25	West Germany	1–2	1–3	Friendly	
21	14 October 1987	Wembley Stadium, London, England	26	Turkey	2–0	8–0	UEFA Euro 1988 qualification	
22	14 October 1987	Wembley Stadium, London, England	26	Turkey	4–0	8–0	UEFA Euro 1988 qualification	
23	14 October 1987	Wembley Stadium, London, England	26	Turkey	7–0	8–0	UEFA Euro 1988 qualification	
24	23 March 1988	Wembley Stadium, London, England	28	Netherlands	1–0	2–2	Friendly	
25	24 May 1988	Wembley Stadium, London, England	31	Colombia	1–0	1–1	1988 Rous Cup	
26	7 September 1988	Stade Olympique de la Pontaise, Lausanne, Switzerland	32	Switzerland	1–0	1–0	Friendly	
27	26 April 1989	Wembley Stadium, London, England	40	Albania	2–0	5–0	1990 FIFA World Cup qualification	
28	3 June 1989	Wembley Stadium, London, England	41	Poland	1–0	3–0	1990 FIFA World Cup qualification	
29	7 July 1989	Københavns Idrætspark, Copenhagen, Denmark	42	Denmark	1–0	1–1	Friendly	
30	28 March 1990	Wembley Stadium, London, England	47	Brazil	1–0	1–0	Friendly	
31	15 May 1990	Wembley Stadium, London, England	49	Denmark	1–0	1–0	Friendly	
32	11 June 1990	Stadio Sant'Elia, Cagliari, Italy	52	Republic of Ireland	1–0	1–1	1990 FIFA World Cup	
33	1 July 1990	Stadio San Paolo, Naples, Italy	56	Cameroon	2–2	3–2 (a.e.t.)	1990 FIFA World Cup	
34	1 July 1990	Stadio San Paolo, Naples, Italy	56	Cameroon	3–2	3–2 (a.e.t.)	1990 FIFA World Cup	
35	4 July 1990	Stadio delle Alpi, Turin, Italy	57	West Germany	1–1	1–1 (3–4 p)	1990 FIFA World Cup	
36	22 September 1990	Wembley Stadium, London, England	59	Hungary	1–0	1–0	Friendly	
37	17 October 1990	Wembley Stadium, London, England	60	Poland	1–0	2–0	UEFA Euro 1992 qualification	
38	6 February 1991	Wembley Stadium, London, England	62	Cameroon	1–0	2–0	Friendly	
39	6 February 1991	Wembley Stadium, London, England	62	Cameroon	2–0	2–0	Friendly	
40	25 May 1991	Wembley Stadium, London, England	65	Argentina	1–0	2–2	1991 England Challenge Cup	
41	3 June 1991	Mount Smart Stadium, Auckland, New Zealand	67	New Zealand	1–0	1–0	Friendly	
42	12 June 1991	Stadium Merdeka, Kuala Lumpur, Malaysia	68	Malaysia	1–0	4–2	Friendly	
43	12 June 1991	Stadium Merdeka, Kuala Lumpur, Malaysia	68	Malaysia	2–0	4–2	Friendly	
44	12 June 1991	Stadium Merdeka, Kuala Lumpur, Malaysia	68	Malaysia	3–0	4–2	Friendly	
45	12 June 1991	Stadium Merdeka, Kuala Lumpur, Malaysia	68	Malaysia	4–1	4–2	Friendly	
46	13 November 1991	Stadion Miejski, Poznań, Poland	71	Poland	1–1	1–1	UEFA Euro 1992 qualification	
47	19 February 1992	Wembley Stadium, London, England	72	France	2–0	2–0	Friendly	
48	29 April 1992	Luzhniki Stadium, Moscow, Russia	74	CIS	1–0	2–2	Friendly	

== Honours ==
Leicester City

- Football League Second Division: 1979–80

Everton

- FA Charity Shield: 1985
- FA Cup runner-up: 1985–86

Barcelona

- Copa del Rey: 1987–88
- European Cup Winners' Cup: 1988–89

Tottenham Hotspur

- FA Cup: 1990–91
- FA Charity Shield: 1991 (shared)

Individual

- English Football Hall of Fame: 2003
- PFA Team of the Century (1977–1996): 2007
- PFA Players' Player of the Year: 1985–86
- FWA Footballer of the Year: 1985–86, 1991–92
- PFA Team of the Year: 1989–90 First Division, 1991–92 First Division
- English First Division top scorer: 1984–85, 1985–86, 1989–90
- English Second Division top scorer: 1982–83
- Ballon d'Or runner-up: 1986
- FIFA 100
- FIFA World Cup Golden Boot: 1986
- FIFA World Cup All-Star Team: 1986
- Onze de Bronze: 1986
- Onze Mondial: 1986, 1987
- World XI: 1986, 1987
- FIFA World Player of the Year bronze award: 1991
- FIFA Fair Play Award: 1990
- FWA Tribute Award: 1997

== Fellowships ==
Lineker is a Visiting Fellow of Lady Margaret Hall, University of Oxford, appointed 2020.

== Honours and awards ==
In 1992, he received an Honorary Master of Arts award from Loughborough University.
