= Michael Stevens (educator) =

American YouTuber (born 1986)

- Stevens at VidCon 2016
- Born: Michael David Stevens; January 23, 1986 (age 40); Kansas City, Missouri, U.S.
- Education: University of Chicago (BA)
- Occupation: YouTuber
- Spouse: Marnie (m. 2016)
- Children: 1

YouTube information
- Channel: Vsauce
- Years active: 2007–present
- Genres: Educational film; popular science; educational entertainment
- Subscribers: 25.4 million
- Views: 7.20 billion
- Last updated: November 15, 2026

Michael David Stevens (born January 23, 1986) is an American educator, public speaker, entertainer, and editor best known for creating and hosting the education YouTube channel Vsauce. His channel initially released video game-related content until the popularity of his educational series DOT saw discussions of general interest become the focus of Vsauce, encompassing explanations of science, philosophy, culture, and illusion.

As the host of Vsauce, Stevens has become one of the most successful YouTubers (with over 25 million subscribers and over 7 billion views), as well as a leading figure in the internet-driven popularization of science and education. By October 2014, his Vsauce channel had nearly 8 million subscribers and 700 million views. In 2017, he created and starred in the YouTube Premium series Mind Field, and presented the nationwide educational stage tour Brain Candy Live! alongside Adam Savage. He also co-hosts the podcast The Rest Is Science with Hannah Fry.

== Early life and education ==
Michael David Stevens was born on January 23, 1986, in Kansas City, Missouri. His father was a chemist. He grew up in Stilwell, Kansas. Stevens graduated from the University of Chicago with a bachelor's degree in psychology and English literature. As an undergraduate, Stevens became interested in video editing, having viewed a re-cut trailer of The Shining.

== Career ==
=== YouTube video editing and Barely Political (2007–2010) ===
First going into YouTube as the user CamPain 2008, he began using superimposition and dubbing to produce short comedic films about candidates in the 2008 United States presidential election. Stevens' online content attracted the interest of Ben Relles, who invited him to become a member of the online comedy group then known as Barely Political.

=== Early Vsauce (2010–2012) ===
Stevens launched the Vsauce channel in 2010. Stevens' educational content on the channel attracted the most attention. He says he was inspired to create scientific videos by Paul Zaloom's work on Beakman's World. Stevens realized that his most popular content tended to incorporate more serious real-world concepts, often exhibiting interdisciplinarity. Notable examples include: "What is the resolution of the eye?"; "What is the speed of dark?"; "Why is your bottom in the middle?"; and "How much money is there in the world?"

Later in 2010, Stevens launched two related channels, named Vsauce2 and Vsauce3, which eventually attained the sole hosts/producers Kevin Lieber and Jake Roper, respectively.

=== Google, TED talks and science education collaborations (2012–2016) ===
In 2012, the year after Next New Networks was acquired by Google, Stevens also began working as a content strategist for Google in London. His role focuses on Google's YouTube platform, including meeting with fellow content creators to optimize their videos' effectiveness. He presented two TED talks in 2013: "How much does a video weigh?" at the official TEDActive, and "Why do we ask questions?" at TEDxVienna. He has also spoken at events for Adweek, VidCon, MIPTV Media Market, the Edinburgh International Television Festival, and for Novo Nordisk as a diabetes educator. In 2015, he appeared at the YouTube Fan Fest in Toronto.

Through his work with Vsauce, Stevens has collaborated with and appeared alongside prominent individuals within the scientific community. These include Bill Nye (on "Why did the chicken cross the road?"), Derek Muller (on quantum randomness), Jack Horner and Chris Pratt (on dinosaur studies and Jurassic World), David Attenborough (in an interview about Planet Earth II).

=== Mind Field and Brain Candy Live (2016–present) ===
In 2016, former MythBusters co-host Adam Savage stated that he would join Stevens on a stage tour in 2017. Later in the year, Stevens published a video to Vsauce announcing that he and Savage would visit forty cities across the United States in early 2017 to present Brain Candy Live. The tour has been described as a live science-based stage show that is "between TED Talks and the Blue Man Group". A second United States tour was scheduled for March–May 2018.

Stevens partnered with YouTube Red (now YouTube Premium) to create and host Mind Field, which premiered in January 2017 through YouTube's paid streaming service on the Vsauce channel. Each episode of the educational series explores a different aspect of human behavior, by hearing from and conducting experiments on Stevens and guests. Stevens said that he had "pitched Mind Field to many television networks and it [had been] rejected".

In 2019, Stevens changed the name of the DONG channel to D!NG to avoid demonetization from YouTube's new policies on advertiser-friendliness. In 2025, he began co-hosting a podcast called The Rest Is Science with British mathematician Hannah Fry.

== Personal life ==
In 2016, Stevens married Marnie, a New Zealander, and moved to Los Angeles. They had a daughter, Maeve, in August 2019. As of February 2026, Stevens resides in Colorado.

== Filmography ==
Year	Title	Role
2012	Dark Matters: Twisted But True	Himself
2013	America Declassified	Himself (as science journalist)
2014	Super Brainy Zombies	Michael
2014	Jimmy Kimmel Live!	Himself
2016	BattleBots	Himself (as judge)
2017–2019	Mind Field	Himself

== Awards ==
Year	Award Show	Category	Recipient	Result	Ref.
2013	RealPlayer Video Visionary Awards	Education	Vsauce	Won	
2014	Webby Awards	People's Voice for News & Information (Channel)	Vsauce	Won	
2014	Streamy Awards	Science and Education	Vsauce	Won	
2015	Streamy Awards	Science or Education	Vsauce	Won	
2015	Streamy Awards	Editing	Michael Stevens and Guy Larsen (Vsauce)	Nominated	
2015	Webby Awards	People's Voice for Science & Education (Channel)	Vsauce Channels	Won	
2016	Webby Awards	People's Voice for Science & Education (Channel)	Vsauce Networks	Won	
