= The Rest Is Entertainment =

Entertainment podcast

- Genre: Talk
- Country of origin: United Kingdom
- Language: English

Cast and voices
- Hosted by: Richard Osman; Marina Hyde

Publication
- Original release: 28 November 2023
- Provider: Goalhanger

Related
- Website: therestisentertainment.com

The Rest Is Entertainment is a British podcast hosted by the television producer and author Richard Osman and the journalist and writer Marina Hyde.

It launched in November 2023 and is produced by Goalhanger Podcasts. Osman and Hyde generally discuss contemporary entertainment stories in the world of film, television, stage, books and other entertainment arenas. By June 2024 the show had reached 2 million monthly downloads.

== Format ==
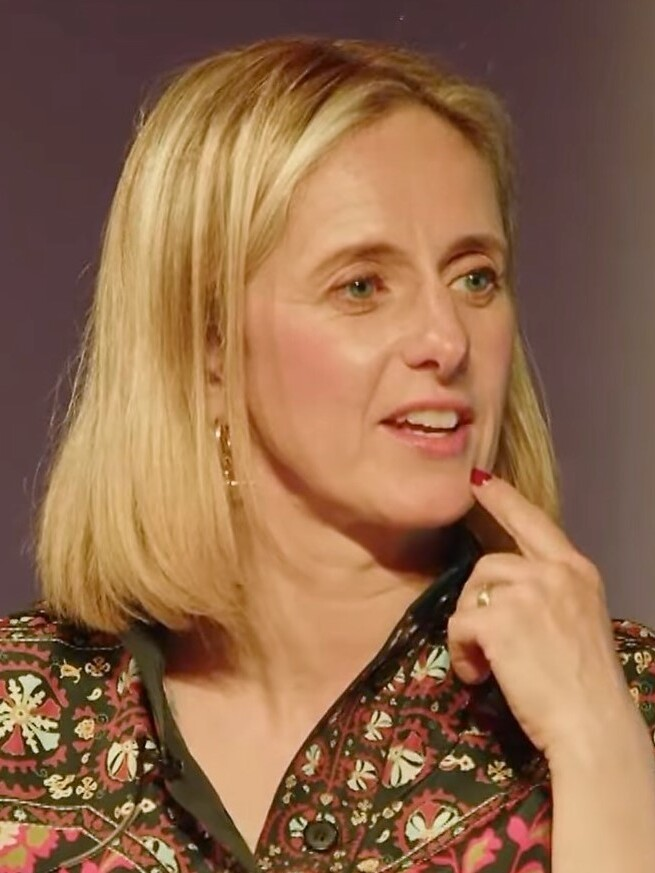
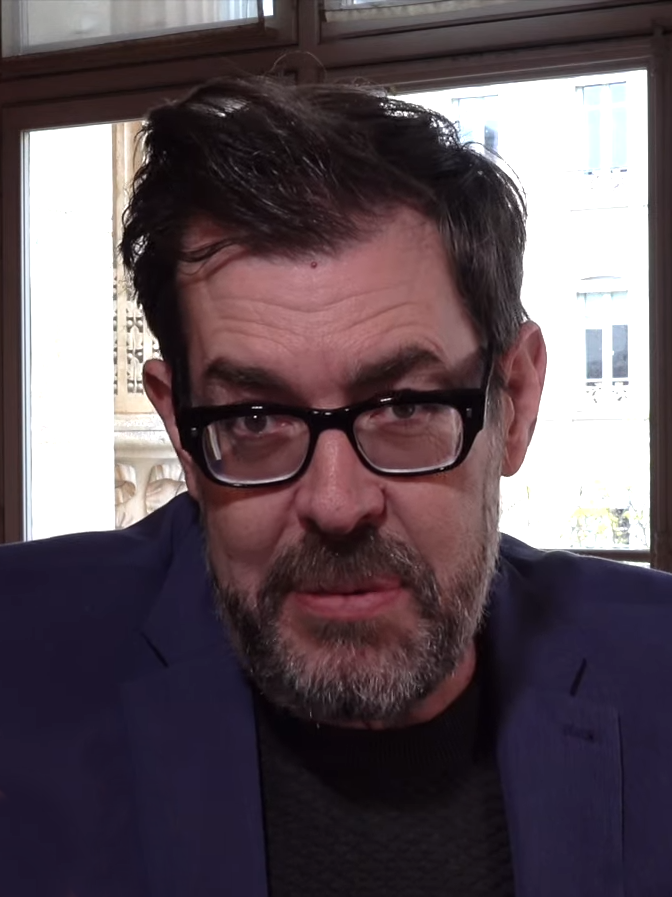
Marina Hyde and Richard Osman, who host the podcast

The podcast normally releases two episodes every week: a "main" episode and a "questions and answers" episode. The main episodes last around 30 to 50 minutes and involve Osman and Hyde discussing contemporary events and news stories, mostly from the United Kingdom. During the question time episodes they answer questions from listeners. The questions are not limited to topics formerly discussed on the podcast and include news stories not discussed on the main episodes as well as the hosts' entertainment careers.

The episodes are also filmed and uploaded to YouTube.

== Live show ==
In December 2024, not long after celebrating 100 episodes, Hyde and Osman hosted a live version of the podcast at the Royal Albert Hall. The event took the form of a variety show, including songs, quizzes, and guest appearances by Alexander Armstrong and Nitro of Gladiators. Chris Bennion of The Telegraph opined it was "a cheerfully ramshackle festive affair that had their devotees in raptures", while James Marriott, writing for The Times, called it "a proper show".
