= Vsauce =

YouTube brand created by Michael Stevens

YouTube information
- Channels: Vsauce; Vsauce2; Vsauce3
- Years active: 2010–present
- Genres: Education; information; science; gaming; technology
- Subscribers: 25.3 million (main channel); 33.7 million (combined) (Note: Subscribers, broken down by channel: 25.3 million (Vsauce); 4.49 million (Vsauce2); 3.94 million (Vsauce3))
- Views: 7.12 billion (main channel); 8.4 billion (combined) (Note: Views, broken down by channel: 7.12 billion (Vsauce); 803 million (Vsauce2); 532 million (Vsauce3))
- Last updated: October 23, 2026
- Website: vsauce.com curiositybox.com

Vsauce (/ˈviːsɔːs/) is a YouTube brand created by American educator Michael Stevens consisting of the eponymous channel plus five other spin-offs. The channels feature videos on scientific, psychological, mathematical, and philosophical topics, as well as gaming, technology, popular culture, and other general interest subjects.

== History ==
In 2009, Michael Stevens was asked by a company to pitch them a show about food, so he teamed up with his friend Justin-superstar from Los Angeles, California, to create a pilot episode showing them using a hammer to supposedly make a peanut butter and banana sandwich in under a second, titling the proposed show "Food Smashers", but the show was never made. The company asked him to create a YouTube channel dedicated to video games and name it "Video Game Nation". Although he agreed, he did not like the name and eventually renamed it "Vsauce".

Michael Stevens came up with the name "Vsauce" in 2010 by generating available pronounceable ".com" domain names using a website called FakeNameGenerator.com until he found one he liked. On July 30, 2007, someone created a YouTube account named "Vsauce" but had never used it, and on April 16, 2010, YouTube granted Michael Stevens's request to claim the account, as was their policy back then; if he were not able to claim it, he might have decided to instead use his first YouTube channel, "pooplicker888".

Initially, the channel's programming focused on video games and featured a number of hosts. The educational segments became more popular, and since September 9, 2012, only the educational segment (known as DOT.) has been presented.

In December 2010, the Vsauce2 (on December 7) and Vsauce3 (on December 24) channels were created. On July 25, 2012, the YouTube channel WeSauce was created. Vsauce was one of the fastest growing channels in September 2012. During that month, the main Vsauce channel reached 1 million subscribers.

Stevens, in the video "A Defense of Comic Sans", notes that the text font Alsina was used by the Vsauce channels because of its close resemblance to the handwriting of Nik Guinta, the creator of the original Vsauce logo. A new branding scheme designed by Natasha Jen was adopted in December 2014 to bring a "grown-up" feel to the channels. It utilizes the DIN Next Rounded font and fluid designs to convey the idea of sauce that the name "Vsauce" implies.

== Channels ==
=== Vsauce ===
Michael Stevens, the host of Vsauce

The Vsauce channel, also known as Vsauce1 to distinguish it from the brand as a whole and the other channels, is presented by the founder, Michael Stevens, and features videos about science, mathematics, anthropology, and philosophy. The primary series features Stevens discussing a topic or question in a tangential manner, including various interpretations of the question and related facts and observations. In 2013, Stevens stated that he researches on Wikipedia and academic papers to find information for his videos. Stevens collaborated with educator and television personality Adam Savage in 2017 for a show titled Brain Candy Live. Stevens has also collaborated with celebrities and other YouTubers like James May and Derek Muller to make videos.

Videos by Vsauce have been featured on online news publications, such as The Huffington Post, CBS, and Gizmodo.

==== Mind Field ====
Mind Field (a word play on minefield and mind) is an American web television series produced exclusively for YouTube Premium (formerly YouTube Red), created and presented by Michael Stevens. Three seasons of Mind Field have been released on Vsauce, each one with eight episodes. On October 1, 2019, all episodes became viewable, with ads, for free for those without YouTube Premium.

=== Vsauce2 ===
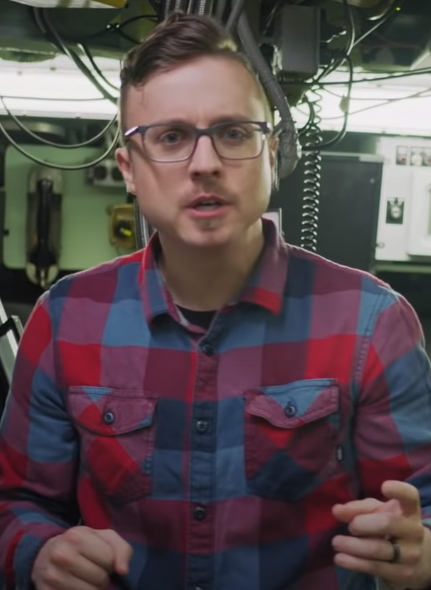
Kevin Lieber, the host of Vsauce2

Vsauce2, hosted by Kevin Lieber, has covered topics concerning unusual knowledge, gadgets, and people. Since 2019, Vsauce2 has largely produced videos regarding probability, paradoxes, and dilemmas, most of which are mathematical or economic in nature and visualized through real-world situations. Before 2019, videos were released under recurring segments, such as MindBlow, BiDiPi, 54321, and BOAT.

==== The Create Unknown ====
In November 2018, Lieber and channel producer Matt Tabor launched The Create Unknown podcast, which interviews digital creators. The podcast has featured interviews with Casey Neistat, Derek Muller from Veritasium, Destin Sandlin from Smarter Every Day, Dolan Dark, iDubbbz, and Grandayy.

=== Vsauce3 ===
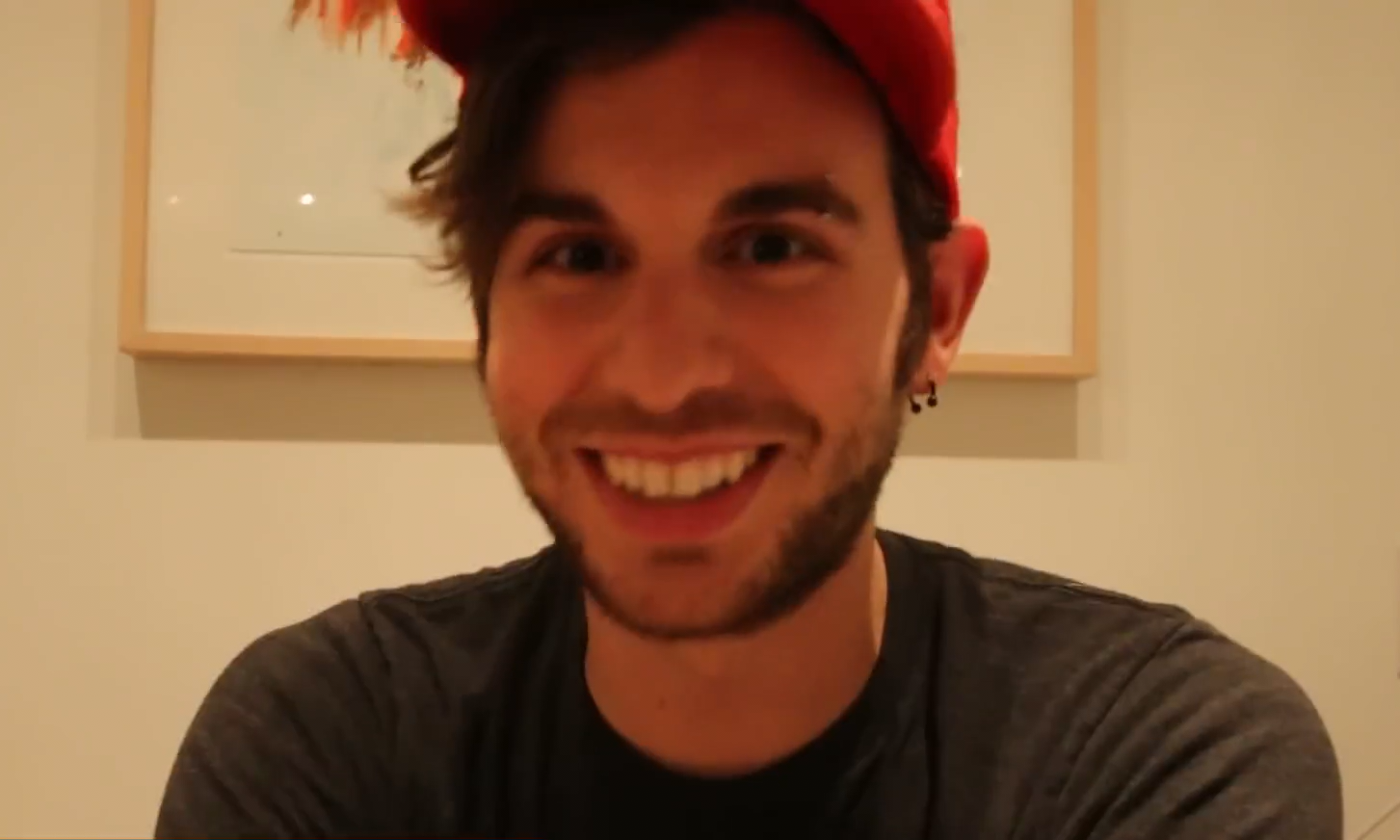
Jake Roper, the host of Vsauce3

Vsauce3 is hosted by Jake Roper and is dedicated to fictional worlds and video games. There are currently four recurring segments: HeadShot, Game LÜT, 9bit, and Fact Surgery. Vsauce3 has collaborated with YouTubers Joe Hanson from It's Okay to be Smart and Vanessa Hill from BrainCraft. He has also presented videos with celebrity guest appearances from Bill Nye, Jack Black, The Muppets, Paul Rudd, and Neil deGrasse Tyson. On November 26, 2015, Jake revealed that he had sarcoma, a rare form of cancer. On December 19, Jake announced that he had begun treatment and a tumor on his lower leg had been successfully removed by surgery.

=== D!NG ===
D!NG, formerly DONG (Do Online Now, Guys), is a spin-off channel by Vsauce that features unusual pages, apps, and games from around the Internet. Some videos also focus on various topics in mathematics and science. DONG was formerly a segment featured on the main Vsauce channel and then on the Vsauce3 channel before its own channel was launched in 2015, with the first video uploaded on October 29, 2015. The channel was renamed to D!NG on May 12, 2019, seemingly due to the channel being demonetized for having a name that was not considered advertiser-friendly.

=== The Rest Is Science ===
The Rest Is Science is a podcast hosted by Michael Stevens and Professor Hannah Fry, and is about varied topics in math and science. They upload videos twice a week, having normal episodes about a certain topic, and "field notes" episodes in which they answer viewers' questions and share things they own or have found. The channel was started on August 22, 2025, and, as of June 10, 2026, they have 586 thousand subscribers and 132 million views.

== Collaborations ==
Some people or channels Michael Stevens of Vsauce1 has collaborated with include Bill Nye, BrainCraft, Derek Muller, Good Mythical Morning, The Filthy Frank Show, and others. The following collaborations were mentioned in publications. Vsauce has collaborated with Henry Reich of MinutePhysics on two videos: "Guns in Space" and "What if the Earth were Hollow?". In 2014, Jake of Vsauce3 had narrated two episodes of the series Did You Know Gaming? covering the Game Boy. In August 2016, Stevens served as a guest host on the show BattleBots. On March 24, 2018, Stevens was largely involved with a collaboration featured on HowToBasic's YouTube channel. In November 2025, Stevens announced his collaboration with British mathematician and fellow content creator Hannah Fry on a podcast called The Rest Is Science.

== Awards ==
In 2014, Vsauce won a Webby for People's Voice award for best news and information.

In 2014 and 2015, the channel won the Streamy Award for Best Science and Education Channel, Show, or Series.
