= The Rest Is Politics =

British podcast and television series

- Genre: Talk
- Format: Audio / Video podcast
- Language: English

Cast and voices
- Hosted by: Alastair Campbell; Rory Stewart

Production
- Length: 40–60 minutes

Publication
- No. of episodes: 670
- Original release: 2 March 2022

Related
- Website: https://therestispolitics.supportingcast.fm

The Rest Is Politics is a British podcast and television series hosted by Alastair Campbell and Rory Stewart. It launched in March 2022, and has since become one of the leading political podcasts in the United Kingdom. The podcast is produced by Goalhanger Podcasts. Campbell and Stewart generally discuss contemporary news and politics, with a strong focus on UK politics, but also international developments, such as foreign elections and humanitarian catastrophes. As Campbell was a member of the Labour Party and Stewart was a Conservative member of Parliament, historically the major opposing parties in British politics, they often come to issues with different perspectives and experiences.

== Background ==
The Rest Is Politics launched in March 2022, hosted by Alastair Campbell and Rory Stewart. Campbell and Stewart are former political figures, of the Labour and Conservative parties respectively. Their podcast is aimed at revealing how governments work, and "disagreeing agreeably".

Campbell is a journalist, political strategist, and mental health activist, known for his work as communications chief for Tony Blair. A former member of the Labour Party, Campbell was expelled after having publicly stated that he had voted for the Liberal Democrats in the 2019 European Parliament elections in the United Kingdom. Stewart is an academic, author, former diplomat and politician. A former member of the Conservative Party, Stewart served as international development secretary and prisons minister under Theresa May. He represented Penrith and The Border in the House of Commons of the United Kingdom for around nine years. In 2019, after Boris Johnson was elected leader of the Conservatives, Stewart resigned from the cabinet. He was part of the 2019 suspension of rebel Conservative MPs for having rebelled against Johnson's approach to Brexit. He later also resigned his party membership.

The Rest is Politics has become one of the leading political podcasts in the United Kingdom. It is produced by Goalhanger, which is owned by former England footballer Gary Lineker.

== Format ==
The podcast ordinarily releases two episodes every week: a "main" episode and a "question time" episode. The main episodes last around 30 to 50 minutes, and involve Campbell and Stewart discussing contemporary events and news stories, mostly from the United Kingdom. During the question time episodes, they answer questions from listeners. The questions are not limited to topics formerly discussed on the podcast, and include news stories not discussed on the main episodes as well as the hosts' political careers. The theme music that starts and ends each episode is "A Diabolical Caper", written by composer Luke Richards.

On some occasions, the podcast releases "emergency" episodes, reacting to major news events, such as the resignations of Sajid Javid and Rishi Sunak, which sparked the July 2022 United Kingdom government crisis that culminated in the resignation of Boris Johnson; the October 2022 United Kingdom government crisis which resulted in the dismissal of Kwasi Kwarteng and resignation of Liz Truss; and the first 2024 United States presidential debate between Joe Biden and Donald Trump.

== Specials ==
=== 2024 election special ===
Ahead of the 2024 general election, The Rest Is Politics was announced in Channel 4's coverage line-up, presenting alongside Emily Maitlis.

No.	Guest(s)	Running time	Original release date	Link
1	N/A	46:00	29 May 2024	Episode
In the first episode, Campbell and Stewart dissect the results of their exclusive poll, which shows Labour's lead is narrowing, and discuss Rishi Sunak's national service policy.
2	N/A	47:00	4 June 2024	Episode
Campbell and Stewart discuss a recent poll that looks particularly damning for the Conservatives, and look at both Sunak and Starmer's latest election pledges.
3	N/A	47:00	11 June 2024	Episode
Campbell and Stewart ask what impact the D-Day fiasco will have on Rishi Sunak.

=== Special guests ===
The podcast hosts special guests, interviewing active and retired politicians on their careers and current events. In January 2023, Goalhanger began a new podcast series, Leading, for Campbell and Stewart to interview their special guests and to invite non-political figures as guests. Since Leading released, The Rest Is Politics did not invite any special guests, with the exception of Israeli public intellectual Yuval Noah Harari and Palestinian ambassador Husam Zomlot during the Gaza war. The following public figures have been interviewed on the podcasts' special episodes:

No.	Guest(s)	Running time	Original release date	Link
1	Sir Tony Blair	54:59	29 June 2022	link at Apple Podcasts
Sir Tony Blair, former Prime Minister of the United Kingdom, discusses UK's international stature after Brexit, the future of the NHS, technology, Labour after Jeremy Corbyn's leadership, and the Russian invasion of Ukraine.
2	Sir Keir Starmer	47:29	20 July 2022	link at Apple Podcasts
Sir Keir Starmer, the Leader of Her Majesty's Most Loyal Opposition and Leader of the Labour Party, discusses his Labour leadership, his economic policy post-Brexit, the Conservative party leadership election, electoral reform in the UK and the UK constitution.
3	Lord Hague of Richmond	50:53	3 August 2022	link at Apple Podcasts
Lord Hague of Richmond, the former UK foreign secretary and former Leader of Her Majesty's Most Loyal Opposition, discusses his tenures as leader of the opposition and as foreign secretary, Boris Johnson's resignation, House of Lords reform, Brexit, and retiring from politics.
4	Mark Drakeford	47:38	16 September 2022	link at Apple Podcasts
Welsh first minister Mark Drakeford discusses Welsh Labour, Welsh and Scottish nationalism, devolution, and his proficiency in Latin.
5	Edi Rama	55:51	23 September 2022	link at Apple Podcasts
Albanian prime minister Edi Rama discusses the European Union, Vladimir Putin, Angela Merkel, English Channel migrant crossings and his career as an artist, sportsperson, and politician.
6	François Hollande	41:34	27 October 2022	link at Apple Podcasts
Former French president François Hollande discusses Vladimir Putin, Xi Jinping, Angela Merkel, Emmanuel Macron, the importance of political parties, and the far right in France.
7	Julia Gillard	53:08	4 November 2022	link at Apple Podcasts
Former Australian prime minister Julia Gillard discusses women in government, her Misogyny Speech, Australian political system, monarchy, and compulsory voting.
8	Helen Clark	01:00:17	2 December 2022	link at Apple Podcasts
Former New Zealand prime minister and UNDP administrator Helen Clark discusses populism, her tenure as prime minister and UNDP administrator, and New Zealand's monarchy.
9	Yuval Noah Harari	48:27	13 October 2023	link at Apple Podcasts
Israeli public intellectual Yuval Noah Harari discusses the Gaza war. Harari has also appeared on Leading separately.
10	Husam Zomlot	01:03:14	13 October 2023	link at Apple Podcasts
Palestinian ambassador to the UK Husam Zamlot discusses the Gaza war and Israeli–Palestinian peace process.
120	Ahmed al-Sharaa	01:10:00	10 February 2025	link at Apple Podcasts
Syrian caretaker government president, Ahmed al-Sharaa, discuss the future of Syria, relations with the US and Post-Assad Syria, and other topics

== US version ==
An American edition was launched in April 2024, with Anthony Scaramucci and Katty Kay hosting.
