= The Rest Is History (podcast) =

History podcast hosted by Dominic Sandbrook and Tom Holland

- Genre: History podcast

Creative team
- Developed by: Goalhanger

Cast and voices
- Hosted by: Dominic Sandbrook, Tom Holland

Publication
- No. of episodes: 994

Reception
- Ratings: 4.7/5

Related
- Website: https://therestishistory.com/main

The Rest Is History is a history podcast hosted by historians Dominic Sandbrook and Tom Holland.

== Overview ==
The podcast was launched in November 2020 and is produced by Goalhanger Podcasts.

It is the highest-ranked UK history podcast on Spotify and Apple, and in the top 10 in the US charts. By June 2026 it had issued 762 episodes and had a rating of 9.6 on IMDb. In October 2024, The Wall Street Journal revealed the podcast achieved 11 million downloads a month, 1.2 million monthly YouTube views and had over 45,000 paying subscribers; 7 out of 10 listeners were aged under 40. In 2024, it was estimated that Holland and Sandbrook each earned nearly $100,000 a month. This had scaled to 15 million downloads a month by September 2025.

"First and foremost, because I think people are bored with history being told in a hand-wringing, pious, judgmental and moralistic way – they want it brought to life by people who are genuine enthusiasts and love the past."

— Dominic Sandbrook answering the question What's the secret of its success? in a 2024 interview with The Daily Telegraph.

The Rest is History has now completed over 800 episodes on a range of subjects. Associated with the show is a paid subscription service called The Rest Is History Club, which offers subscribers early access to episodes, bonus episodes, and other exclusive content.

== Awards and recognition ==
The series received the 2023 President's Medal from the British Academy, the first time this had been awarded to a podcast.
