= 1997–98 RCD Mallorca season =

Real Club Deportivo Mallorca
1997–98 season
- President: Bartolomé Beltran
- Manager: Héctor Cúper
- Stadium: Lluis Sitjar
- La Liga: 5th
- Copa del Rey: Runners-up (in Cup Winners' Cup)
- Top goalscorer: League: Gabriel Amato (13); All: Gabriel Amato (14)
Home colours	Away colours

In the 1997–98 season Real Club Deportivo Mallorca competed in La Liga and Copa del Rey.

== Summary ==
The club with the President Bartolome Beltran appointed on 10 July 1997, Argentinian head coach Héctor Cúper from Lanús as its new manager, winning the spot ahead of Portuguese José Mourinho. After winning the relegation playoff defeating Rayo Vallecano and Cuper secured, Beltran announced several transfers in for the La Liga newcomer team: Brazilian attacking midfielder Palhinha (1994 FIFA World Cup Champion) arrived from Cruzeiro, Brazilian right back Ivan Rocha and Argentinian striker Gabriel Amato from Hércules CF. On 15 August 1997 Argentinian goalkeeper Carlos Roa and right winger Oscar Mena were transferred in from Lanús.

Also, Beltran negotiated six transfers from Valencia CF due to these players were discarded by Argentinian coach Jorge Valdano: left back Enrique Romero, defensive midfielder Vicente Engonga, Galvez, striker Moya, central back Iván Campo and midfielder Xabier Eskurza. Two more incorporations attacking midfielder Juan Carlos Valeron from UD Las Palmas and left winger Jovan Stankovic from CD Logroñés, both players arrived to the club after the few chances of play in their former teams.

== Squad ==
Squad at end of season

Note: Flags indicate national team as defined under FIFA eligibility rules; some limited exceptions apply. Players may hold more than one non-FIFA nationality.

No.	Pos.	Nation	Player
1	GK	ESP	Kike Burgos
2	MF	ARG	Oscar Mena
3	DF	BRA	Ivan Rocha
4	DF	ESP	Barbero
5	DF	ESP	Marcelino
6	DF	ESP	Paco
7	DF	ESP	Lluís Carreras
8	FW	ESP	Gabriel Moya
9	FW	ARG	Gabriel Amato
10	MF	BRA	Palhinha
10	FW	ESP	Santiago Ezquerro
11	MF	YUG	Jovan Stanković
12	DF	ESP	Iván Campo

No.	Pos.	Nation	Player
13	GK	ARG	Carlos Roa
14	MF	ESP	Javier Olaizola
15	MF	ESP	Paco Soler
16	FW	ESP	José Gálvez
18	DF	ESP	Xabier Eskurza
19	MF	ESP	Juan Carlos Valeron
20	MF	ESP	Monchu
21	FW	ESP	Enrique Romero
23	MF	ESP	Vicente Engonga
24	GK	ESP	Xabier
26	DF	ESP	Fernando Niño
—	DF	ESP	David Castedo

=== Transfers ===
In
Pos.	Name	from	Type
AM	Palhinha	Cruzeiro	
FW	Gabriel Amato	Hércules CF	
GK	Carlos Roa	Lanús	
MF	Oscar Mena	Lanús	
MF	Juan Carlos Valeron	UD Las Palmas	
DF	Enrique Romero	Valencia CF	
DF	Iván Campo	Valencia CF	
FW	Gabriel Moya	Valencia CF	
MF	Vicente Engonga	Valencia CF	loan
FW	Jose Galvez	Valencia CF	
MF	Xabier Eskurza	Valencia CF	
DF	Ivan Rocha	Atlético Madrid	

Out
Pos.	Name	To	Type
AM	Palhinha	Flamengo	

=== Left club during season ===
Note: Flags indicate national team as defined under FIFA eligibility rules; some limited exceptions apply. Players may hold more than one non-FIFA nationality.

No.	Pos.	Nation	Player
10	MF	BRA	Palhinha (to Flamengo)

==== Arrived club during season ====
Note: Flags indicate national team as defined under FIFA eligibility rules; some limited exceptions apply. Players may hold more than one non-FIFA nationality.

No.	Pos.	Nation	Player
10	FW	ESP	Santiago Ezquerro (loan from Atlético Madrid)
3	DF	BRA	Ivan Rocha (loan from Atlético Madrid)

== Competitions ==
=== La Liga ===
==== League table ====
Pos	Team	Pld	W	D	L	GF	GA	GD	Pts	Qualification or relegation
3	Real Sociedad	38	16	15	7	60	37	+23	63 (Note: RMA 2–0 RSO; RSO 4–2 RMA)	Qualification for the UEFA Cup first round
4	Real Madrid	38	17	12	9	63	45	+18	63	Qualification for the Champions League group stage (Note: Real Madrid was qualified directly for the 1998–99 UEFA Champions League as holders.)
5	Mallorca	38	16	12	10	55	39	+16	60 (Note: MLL: 9 pts; CEL: 5 pts; ATM: 2 pts)	Qualification for the Cup Winners' Cup first round (Note: Since Barcelona, winners of 1997–98 Copa del Rey, was qualified for the 1998–99 UEFA Champions League, losing cup finalists RCD Mallorca earned a spot in the first round of the 1998–99 UEFA Cup Winners' Cup.)
6	Celta Vigo	38	17	9	12	54	47	+7	60	Qualification for the UEFA Cup first round
7	Atlético Madrid	38	16	12	10	79	56	+23	60	Qualification for the UEFA Cup first round

Source: LFP
Rules for classification: 1) points; 2) head-to-head points; 3) head-to-head goal difference; 4) head-to-head goals scored; 5) goal difference; 6) number of goals scored.

==== Results by round ====
Round	1	2	3	4	5	6	7	8	9	10	11	12	13	14	15	16	17	18	19	20	21	22	23	24	25	26	27	28	29	30	31	32	33	34	35	36	37	38
Ground	A	H	A	H	A	H	A	H	H	A	H	A	H	A	H	A	A	H	A	H	A	H	A	H	H	A	A	H	A	H	A	H	H	A	H	A	H	A
Result	W	D	W	W	D	L	W	D	D	W	L	D	D	L	L	L	W	W	L	D	D	W	W	W	D	W	L	D	L	W	W	W	W	D	L	W	D	L
Position	6	9	2	2	2	4	4	5	7	6	7	7	7	8	10	11	9	8	9	9	9	9	6	6	7	5	7	8	9	8	7	4	4	4	5	5	5	5

Source: Competitive matches
A = Away; H = Home; W = Win; D = Draw; L = Loss; = Leader, 1998–99 UEFA Champions League Group stage; = 1998–99 UEFA Champions League Second qualifying round; = 1998–99 UEFA Cup First round; = Qualification for the Intertoto Cup third round; = Qualification for the Intertoto Cup second round; = 1998–99 Segunda División; c = 1998–99 UEFA Cup Winners' Cup

==== Matches ====
31 August 1997 1	Mallorca	2–1	Valencia CF	Palma de Mallorca
	Amato 4'; Cáceres 86' (own goal); Olaizola (yellow card); Moya (yellow card); Eskurza (yellow card) 87' (yellow-red card)	Report	54'Djukic; (yellow card) Juanfran; (yellow card) Saïb; (yellow card) 89' (yellow-red card) Djukic	Stadium: Estadio Lluis Sitjar; Referee: Megia Davila

7 September 1997 2	Deportivo La Coruña	1–1	Mallorca	A Coruña
	Iván Campo 44' (own goal); Ramis (yellow card); Naybet (yellow card); Nando (yellow card)	Report	43'Moya; (yellow card) Iván Campo; (yellow card) Olaizola; (yellow card) Stankovic	Stadium: Estadio Riazor; Referee: Perez Burrull

15 September 1997 3	Mallorca	6–2	Sporting Gijón	Palma de Mallorca
	Mena 20'; Moya 44'; Amato 47'; Monchu 79', 84'; Villarroya 82' (o.g.)		14' Kosolapov; 74' Kucharski	Stadium: Estadio Lluis Sitjar; Referee: Esquinas Torres

28 September 1997 4	CD Tenerife	1–4	Mallorca	Santa Cruz de Tenerife
	Kodro 27'	Report	4' Mena; 40' (pen.) Amato; 84' (pen.) Mena; 89' Monchu; (yellow card) 71' (yellow-red card) Ivan Campo	Stadium: Estadio Heliodoro Rodriguez; Referee: Fernandez Marin

5 October 1997 5	SD Compostela	2–2	Mallorca	Santiago de Compostela
	Penev 14' (pen.); Ohen 24'	Report	2' (pen.) Amato; 76' Romero	Stadium: San Lázaro; Referee: Prados García

14 October 1997 6	Mallorca	0–1	FC Barcelona	Palma de Mallorca
		Report	5' Luis Enrique	Stadium: Lluís Sitjar Stadium

19 October 1997 7	Racing de Santander	0–1	Mallorca	Santander
		Report	43' Amato	Stadium: Estadio El Sardinero; Referee: Díaz Vega

27 October 1997 8	Mallorca	0–0	Real Madrid	Palma de Mallorca
		Report		Stadium: Estadio Lluis Sitjar

1 November 1997 9	Real Valladolid	0–0	Mallorca	Valladolid
		Report		Stadium: Estadio José Zorrilla

8 November 1997 10	RCD Mallorca	4–0	Athletic de Bilbao	Palma de Mallorca
	Iván Campo 2'; Amato 27'; Monchu 29'; Valerón 53'	Report		Stadium: Estadio Lluis Sitjar; Referee: Esquinas Torres

12 November 1997 11	Celta de Vigo	1–0	Mallorca	Vigo
	Eggen 74'	Report		Stadium: Estadio Balaídos; Referee: García Aranda

16 November 1997 12	Mallorca	1–1	Real Oviedo	Palma de Mallorca
	Mena 55'	Report	50' Pompei	Stadium: Estadio Lluis Sitjar; Referee: Fernández Marín

26 September 1998 13	CP Mérida	0–0	Mallorca	Mérida
		Report		Stadium: Romano

30 November 1997 14	Mallorca	0–2	Real Zaragoza	Palma de Mallorca
		Report	37' Soler; 89' Kily González	Stadium: Estadio Lluis Sitjar; Referee: Gil García

6 December 1997 15	RCD Espanyol	1–0	Mallorca	Barcelona
	Quique Martín 5'	Report		Stadium: Olímpic; Referee: Rodríguez Martel

13 December 1997 16	Mallorca	1–2	Real Betis	Palma de Mallorca
	Gálvez 1'	Report	7' Jarni; 36' Finidi; (yellow card) 59' (yellow-red card) Fernando	Stadium: Estadio Lluis Sitjar; Referee: Pérez Lasa

16 December 1997 17	Atlético Madrid	2-3	Mallorca	Madrid
	Santi 11'; Bogdanovic 49'	Report	Pepe Galvez 1'; Carreras 42'; Valeron 69'	Stadium: Estadio Vicente Calderón

22 December 1997 18	Mallorca	1–0	UD Salamanca	Palma de Mallorca
	Amato 89'	Report	(yellow card) 78' (yellow-red card) Loren	Stadium: Estadio Lluis Sitjar; Referee: Díaz Vega

4 January 1998 19	Real Sociedad	1–0	Mallorca	San Sebastián
	De Pedro 25'	Report		Stadium: Estadio Anoeta; Referee: Mejuto González

12 January 1998 20	Valencia CF	0–0	Mallorca	Valencia
		Report		Stadium: Estadio Mestalla

18 January 1998 21	Mallorca	0–0	Deportivo La Coruña	Palma de Mallorca
		Report		Stadium: Estadio Lluis Sitjar

25 January 1998 22	Sporting Gijón	1–3	Mallorca	Gijón
	Lediakhov 6' (pen.)	Report	Amato 2'; Gálvez 26'; Valerón 77'	Stadium: El Molinon; Referee: Esquinas Torres

31 January 1998 23	Mallorca	5–1	CD Tenerife	Palma de Mallorca
	Stanković 9'; Amato 15'; Gálvez 39'; Ezquerro 84'; Paco Soler 88'	Report	70' Kodro	Stadium: Estadio Lluis Sitjar; Referee: Daudén Ibáñez

7 February 1998 24	Mallorca	2–1	SD Compostela	Palma de Mallorca
	Stanković 47'; Ezquerro 59'; Valeron 23'	Report	18' Passi	Stadium: Estadio Lluis Sitjar; Referee: Pérez Burrull

15 February 1998 25	FC Barcelona	0–0	RCD Mallorca	Barcelona
		Report		Stadium: Camp Nou

22 February 1998 15	Mallorca	2–1	Racing de Santander	Palma de Mallorca
	Marcelino 84'; Romero 88'	Report	87' Javi López	Stadium: Estadio Lluis Sitjar; Referee: Megía Dávila

28 February 1998 27	Real Madrid	2–0	Mallorca	Madrid
	Roberto Carlos 11'; Mijatovic 32'	Report		Stadium: Estadio Santiago Bernabéu; Referee: Miguel Lasa

8 March 1998 28	Mallorca	1–1	Real Valladolid	Palma de Mallorca
	Marcelino 89'	Report	58', (yellow card) 75' (yellow-red card) Klimowicz	Stadium: Estadio Lluis Sitjar; Referee: Losantos Omar

16 March 1998 29	Athletic de Bilbao	3–1	Mallorca	Bilbao
	Larrazabal 30'; Carlos García 67'; 96' (pen.) Larrazabal	Report	72' (pen.) Amato	Stadium: San Mamés; Referee: Prados García

22 March 1998 30	Mallorca	4–2	Celta de Vigo	Palma de Mallorca
	Ezquerro 20'; Mena 44' (pen.); Amato 75'; Stanković 85'	Report	53' Eggen; 56' Eggen	Stadium: Estadio Lluis Sitjar; Referee: José Japón Sevilla

29 March 1998 31	Real Oviedo	0–1	Mallorca	Oviedo
		Report	29' Amato	Stadium: Carlos Tartiere; Referee: Iturralde González

5 April 1998 32	Mallorca	1–0	CP Mérida	Palma de Mallorca
	Mena 23' (pen.)	Report		Stadium: Estadio Lluis Sitjar; Referee: Mejuto González

12 April 1998 33	Real Zaragoza	2–3	Mallorca	Zaragoza
	Jamelli 50'; Jamelli 58'	Report	9' Ezquerro; 62' Ezquerro; 78' Mena	Stadium: Estadio La Romareda; Referee: López de la Fuente

19 April 1998 34	Mallorca	2–2	RCD Espanyol	Palma de Mallorca
	Ezquerro 48'; Stankovic 65'	Report	55' Esnaider; 89' Esnaider	Stadium: Estadio Lluis Sitjar; Referee: Diaz Vega

25 April 1998 35	Real Betis	2–1	Mallorca	Seville
	Oli 65'; 88' Alfonso	Report	30' Romero	Stadium: Estadio Benito Villamarin; Referee: Pérez Burrull

2 May 1998 36	Mallorca	2-1	Atlético Madrid	Palma de Mallorca
	Pepe Gálvez 43'; Moya 47'		15' Paunovic	Stadium: Lluís Sitjar

10 May 1998 37	UD Salamanca	1–1	Mallorca	Villares de la Reina
	Popescu 76'	Report	8' Amato; 45' Roa	Stadium: Helmántico; Referee: Lopez Nieto

15 May 1998 38	Mallorca	0–1	Real Sociedad	Palma de Mallorca
	Olaizola (red card) 75'	Report	88' (pen.) Kovacevic; (red card) 75' Juan Gomez	Stadium: Estadio Lluis Sitjar; Referee: Prados Garcia

=== Copa del Rey ===
==== Second round ====
8 October 1997	CF Sóller	1–1	Mallorca	Sóller
		Report		Stadium: Camp d'en Maiol

29 October 1997	Mallorca	6–0	CF Sóller	Palma de Mallorca
		Report		Stadium: Lluis Sitjar

==== Third round ====
2 December 1997	UD Las Palmas	3–2	Mallorca	Las Palmas
		Report		Stadium: Gran Canaria

7 January 1998	Mallorca	2–1	UD Las Palmas	Palma de Mallorca
		Report		Stadium: Lluis Sitjar

==== Eightfinals ====
14 January 1998	Mallorca	1–0	Celta Vigo	Palma
21:15 CET	Marcelino 84'	Report (in Spanish)		Stadium: Lluís Sitjar; Attendance: 10,357; Referee: Iturralde González

21 January 1998	Celta Vigo	2–1	Mallorca	Vigo
21:00 CET	Mostovoi 42'; Moisés 52' (pen.)	Report (in Spanish)	Ezquerro 77'	Stadium: Balaídos; Attendance: 23,000; Referee: Brito Arceo (Canary Islands)

==== Quarterfinals ====
3 February 1998	Athletic Bilbao	2–1	Mallorca	Bilbao
21:30 CET	Urzaiz 6'; Alkiza 50'	Report (in Spanish)	Monchu 21'	Stadium: San Mamés; Attendance: 36,000; Referee: Gracia Redondo

10 February 1998	Mallorca	1–0	Athletic Bilbao	Palma
22:00 CET	Stanković 67'	Report (in Spanish)		Stadium: Lluís Sitjar; Attendance: 20,000; Referee: Ansuátegui Roca

==== Semifinals ====
19 February 1998	Alavés	1–2	Mallorca	Vitoria-Gasteiz
22:00 CET	Gómez 49'	Report (in Spanish)	Ezquerro 45+1'; Stanković 82'	Stadium: Mendizorrotza; Attendance: 9,000; Referee: Brito Arceo

25 February 1998	Mallorca	1–0	Alavés	Palma
21:30 CET	Gálvez 89'	Report (in Spanish)		Stadium: Lluís Sitjar; Attendance: 22,382; Referee: Fernández Marín

==== Final ====
29 April 1998	Barcelona	1–1 (a.e.t.) (5–4 p)	Mallorca	Valencia
21:00 CET	Rivaldo 66'	Report	Stanković 6'	Stadium: Mestalla; Attendance: 54,000; Referee: Arturo Daudén Ibáñez
	Penalties
	Rivaldo (penalty missed); Giovanni (penalty scored); Celades (penalty missed); Pizzi (penalty scored); Roger (penalty scored); Figo (penalty missed); Óscar (penalty scored); Reiziger (penalty scored)		(penalty missed) Rocha; (penalty scored) Soler; (penalty missed) Campo; (penalty scored) Olaizola; (penalty scored) Roa; (penalty missed) Stanković; (penalty scored) Amato; (penalty missed) Eskurza

== Statistics ==
=== Players Statistics ===
No.	Pos	Nat	Player	Total		La Liga		Copa del Rey	
No.	Pos	Nat	Player	Apps	Goals	Apps	Goals	Apps	Goals
13	GK	(Argentina) ARG	Carlos Roa	31	-28	25	-22	6	-6
14	DF	(Spain) ESP	Javier Olaizola	45	0	37	0	7+1	0
5	DF	(Spain) ESP	Marcelino	46	3	36	2	10	1
12	DF	(Spain) ESP	Iván Campo	43	1	33	1	10	0
21	DF	(Spain) ESP	Enrique Romero	47	3	38	3	9	0
2	MF	(Argentina) ARG	Oscar Mena	46	9	35	7	7+4	2
23	MF	(Spain) ESP	Vicente Engonga	41	0	34	0	5+2	0
19	MF	(Spain) ESP	Juan Carlos Valeron	47	4	32+4	3	9+2	1
11	MF	(Federal Republic of Yugoslavia) YUG	Jovan Stanković	44	9	31+4	4	7+2	5
9	FW	(Argentina) ARG	Gabriel Amato	46	14	32+3	13	8+3	1
8	FW	(Spain) ESP	Gabriel Moya	25	3	16+7	3	1+1	0
1	GK	(Spain) ESP	Kike	19	-22	13+1	-17	5	-5
16	FW	(Spain) ESP	Jose Galvez	32	9	13+12	5	5+2	4
18	DF	(Spain) ESP	Xabier Eskurza	30	1	8+16	0	5+1	1
10	FW	(Spain) ESP	Santiago Ezquerro	20	8	7+7	6	3+3	2
7	DF	(Spain) ESP	Lluís Carreras	17	1	7+5	1	2+3	0
15	MF	(Spain) ESP	Paco Soler	30	1	5+17	1	5+3	0
20	MF	(Spain) ESP	Monchu	22	5	5+12	4	5	1
10	MF	(Brazil) BRA	Palhinha	11	0	5+4	0	2	0
3	DF	(Brazil) BRA	Ivan Rocha	11	0	4+3	0	0+4	0
3	DF	(Spain) ESP	David Castedo	5	1	1+1	0	3	1
4	DF	(Spain) ESP	Barbero	4	0	1	0	3	0
6	DF	(Spain) ESP	Paco Sanz	1	0	0	0	1	0
24	GK	(Spain) ESP	Xabier	0	0	0	0		
26	DF	(Spain) ESP	Fernando Niño						
	MF	(Spain) ESP	Maldonado	1	0	0	0	1	0
	MF	(Spain) ESP	Martí	1	0	0	0	1	0

== See also ==
- RCD Mallorca
- 1997–98 La Liga
- 1997–98 Copa del Rey
