= 1997–98 FC Barcelona season =

99th season in existence of FC Barcelona

Barcelona
1997–98 season
- President: Josep Lluís Núñez
- Head Coach: Louis van Gaal
- Stadium: Camp Nou
- La Liga: Winners
- Copa del Rey: Winners
- Supercopa de España: Runners-up
- UEFA Champions League: Group stage (4th)
- UEFA Super Cup: Winners
- Top goalscorer: League: Rivaldo (19); All: Rivaldo (28)
Home colours	Away colours

The 1997–98 FC Barcelona season saw the club win the La Liga title and the Copa Del Rey, under the guidance of new coach Louis van Gaal. Van Gaal was hired from Ajax. Strikers Sonny Anderson and Rivaldo also joined the team. The club sold Ronaldo to Inter Milan just before the season began, with Anderson becoming their main striker. Van Gaal introduced a 4-3-3 formation to Barcelona, under which Rivaldo scored 20 goals in the league as centre forward. Barcelona won their 15th La Liga title after secured a narrow win over Real Zaragoza on 18 April 1998 with four league games to spare, their second European Super Cup title and their 24th Copa del Rey title, thus winning a domestic double. Barcelona crashed out of the UEFA Champions League, however, finishing last in their group.

== Squad ==
Squad at end of season

Note: Flags indicate national team as defined under FIFA eligibility rules; some limited exceptions apply. Players may hold more than one non-FIFA nationality.

No.	Pos.	Nation	Player
1	GK	POR	Vítor Baía
2	DF	ESP	Albert Ferrer
3	DF	ESP	Abelardo
4	MF	ESP	Pep Guardiola (captain)
5	DF	POR	Fernando Couto
6	MF	ESP	Óscar García
7	MF	POR	Luís Figo
8	FW	BUL	Hristo Stoitchkov
9	FW	BRA	Sonny Anderson
10	MF	BRA	Giovanni
11	MF	BRA	Rivaldo
12	DF	ESP	Sergi Barjuán
13	GK	NED	Ruud Hesp
14	MF	NGR	Emmanuel Amunike
16	MF	YUG	Dragan Ćirić
17	DF	NED	Winston Bogarde

No.	Pos.	Nation	Player
18	MF	ESP	Guillermo Amor
19	FW	ESP	Juan Antonio Pizzi
20	DF	ESP	Miguel Ángel Nadal
21	MF	ESP	Luis Enrique
22	DF	NED	Michael Reiziger
23	MF	ESP	Iván de la Peña
25	GK	ESP	Carles Busquets
26	MF	ESP	Albert Celades
27	MF	ESP	Roger García
28	DF	ESP	Carles Puyol
29	MF	ESP	Xavi
31	MF	ESP	Mario Rosas
32	MF	ESP	Jofre

=== Transfers ===
In
Pos.	Name	from	Type
FW	Rivaldo	Deportivo	U$20,0 million
FW	Sonny Anderson	Monaco	
GK	Ruud Hesp	Roda JC	
DF	Michael Reiziger	AC Milan	
FW	Christophe Dugarry	AC Milan	
MF	Dragan Ćirić	Partizan	

Out
Pos.	Name	To	Type
FW	Ronaldo	Inter Milan	U$31,0 million
DF	Laurent Blanc	Marseille	
MF	Gheorghe Popescu	Galatasaray	
FW	Ángel Cuéllar	Real Betis	
GK	Julen Lopetegui	Rayo Vallecano	
MF	Goran Vučević	FC Köln	
DF	Quique Álvarez	Logroñés	Loan

==== Winter ====
In
Pos.	Name	from	Type
DF	Winston Bogarde	AC Milan	

Out
Pos.	Name	To	Type
FW	Christophe Dugarry	Marseille	
FW	Hristo Stoichkov	CSKA Sofia	

== Competitions ==
=== La Liga ===
==== League table ====
Pos	Team	Pld	W	D	L	GF	GA	GD	Pts	Qualification or relegation
1	Barcelona (C)	38	23	5	10	78	56	+22	74	Qualification for the Champions League group stage
2	Athletic Bilbao	38	17	14	7	52	42	+10	65	Qualification for the Champions League second qualifying round
3	Real Sociedad	38	16	15	7	60	37	+23	63 (Note: RMA 2–0 RSO; RSO 4–2 RMA)	Qualification for the UEFA Cup first round
4	Real Madrid	38	17	12	9	63	45	+18	63	Qualification for the Champions League group stage (Note: Real Madrid was qualified directly for the 1998–99 UEFA Champions League as holders.)
5	Mallorca	38	16	12	10	55	39	+16	60 (Note: MLL: 9 pts; CEL: 5 pts; ATM: 2 pts)	Qualification for the Cup Winners' Cup first round (Note: Since Barcelona, winners of 1997–98 Copa del Rey, was qualified for the 1998–99 UEFA Champions League, losing cup finalists RCD Mallorca earned a spot in the first round of the 1998–99 UEFA Cup Winners' Cup.)

Source: LFP
Rules for classification: 1) points; 2) head-to-head points; 3) head-to-head goal difference; 4) head-to-head goals scored; 5) goal difference; 6) number of goals scored.
(C) Champions

==== Results by round ====
Round	1	2	3	4	5	6	7	8	9	10	11	12	13	14	15	16	17	18	19	20	21	22	23	24	25	26	27	28	29	30	31	32	33	34	35	36	37	38
Ground	H	A	H	A	H	A	A	H	A	H	A	H	A	H	A	H	H	A	A	H	A	H	A	H	H	A	H	A	H	A	H	A	A	H	A	H	A	H
Result	W	W	W	W	W	W	D	W	W	L	L	W	L	W	W	W	W	L	D	L	L	W	D	D	W	W	W	W	W	W	L	W	W	W	D	L	L	L
Position	1	1	1	1	1	1	1	1	1	1	1	1	2	2	1	1	1	1	1	1	1	1	1	1	1	1	1	1	1	1	1	1	1	1	1	1	1	1

Source: Competitive matches
A = Away; H = Home; W = Win; D = Draw; L = Loss; = Leader, 1998–99 UEFA Champions League Group stage; = 1998–99 UEFA Champions League Second qualifying round; = 1998–99 UEFA Cup First round; = Qualification for the Intertoto Cup third round; = Qualification for the Intertoto Cup second round; = 1998–99 Segunda División

==== Matches ====
31 August 1997 1	Barcelona	3–0	Real Sociedad	Barcelona
	Rivaldo 26' 80'; Giovanni 56'	Report		Stadium: Camp Nou

8 September 1997 2	Valencia	0–3	Barcelona	Valencia
		Report	Anderson 1'; Rivaldo 37' (pen.) de la Peña 81'	Stadium: Estadio Mestalla

13 September 1997 3	Barcelona	2–1	Deportivo La Coruña	Barcelona
	Enrique 23'; Anderson 87'	Report	Luizão 89'	Stadium: Camp Nou

27 September 1997 4	Sporting de Gijón	1–4	Barcelona	Gijón
	Bango 30'	Report	Enrique 2' 73'; Rivaldo 8' 82'	Stadium: Estadio El Molinon

5 October 1997 5	Barcelona	3–2	Tenerife	Barcelona
	Óscar 6' 31'; Enrique 50'	Report	Juanele 24'; Paz 28'	Stadium: Camp Nou

14 October 1997 6	Mallorca	0–1	Barcelona	Palma de Mallorca
		Report	Enrique 5'	Stadium: Lluís Sitjar Stadium

18 October 1997 7	Compostela	2–2	Barcelona	Santiago de Compostela
	Penev 36'; Nacho 56'	Report	Óscar 59'; Rivaldo 73'	Stadium: San Lázaro

26 October 1997 8	Barcelona	2–0	Racing de Santander	Barcelona
	Óscar 51'; Enrique 68'	Report		Stadium: Camp Nou

1 November 1997 9	Real Madrid	2–3	Barcelona	Madrid
	Raúl 48'; Šuker 61'	Report	Rivaldo 5'; Enrique 50'; Anderson 79'	Stadium: Estadio Santiago Bernabéu

9 November 1997 10	Barcelona	1–2	Real Valladolid	Barcelona
	Pizzi 89'	Report	Eusebio 10'; Peternac 50'	Stadium: Camp Nou

13 November 1997 11	Athletic de Bilbao	3–0	Barcelona	Bilbao
	Ziganda 40'; Alkiza 50'; Urzaiz 72'	Report		Stadium: San Mamés

16 November 1997 12	Barcelona	3–2	Celta de Vigo	Barcelona
	Eggen 10' (o.g.); Rivaldo 60'; Pizzi 66'	Report	Cadete 37'; Sánchez 84'	Stadium: Camp Nou

22 November 1997 13	Real Oviedo	1–0	Barcelona	Oviedo
	Pompei 67' (pen.)	Report		Stadium: Estadio Carlos Tartiere

1 December 1997 14	Barcelona	3–1	Mérida	Barcelona
	Anderson 34'; Enrique 70'; Rivaldo 73' (pen.)	Report	Sinval 81' (pen.)	Stadium: Camp Nou

6 December 1997 15	Real Zaragoza	1–2	Barcelona	Zaragoza
	Aragón 54'	Report	Barjuán 17'; Rivaldo 30'	Stadium: Estadio La Romareda

13 December 1997 16	Barcelona	3–1	Espanyol	Barcelona
	Enrique 24'; Giovanni 51'; Barjuán 72'	Report	Esnáider 58' (pen.)	Stadium: Camp Nou

20 December 1997 18	Barcelona	3–1	Atlético de Madrid	Barcelona
	Enrique 48' 70'; Giovanni 65' (pen.)	Report	Roberto 21'	Stadium: Camp Nou

5 January 1998 19	Salamanca	4–3	Barcelona	Villares de la Reina
	Zegarra 43'; Brito 80' (pen.) 83'; Silvani 87'	Report	Anderson 12'; Enrique 50'; Giovanni 68' (pen.)	Stadium: Helmántico Stadium

11 January 1998 20	Real Sociedad	2–2	Barcelona	San Sebastián
	Loren 82' de Paula 89'	Report	Enrique 30'; Anderson 70'	Stadium: Estadio Anoeta

19 January 1998 21	Barcelona	3–4	Valencia	Barcelona
	Enrique 32'; Rivaldo 49'; Cáceres 54' (o.g.)	Report	Morigi 69'; López 75' 87'; Ortega 88'	Stadium: Camp Nou

25 January 1998 22	Deportivo La Coruña	3–1	Barcelona	La Coruña
	Fran 3'; Abreu 75'; Djalminha 84'	Report	Pizzi 85'	Stadium: Estadio Riazor

1 February 1998 23	Barcelona	2–1	Sporting de Gijón	Barcelona
	Rivaldo 18' 37'	Report	Cheryshev 35'	Stadium: Camp Nou

8 February 1998 24	Tenerife	1–1	Barcelona	Santa Cruz de Tenerife
	Jokanović 46'	Report	Rivaldo 44'	Stadium: Estadio Heliodoro Rodriguez

15 February 1998 25	Barcelona	0–0	Mallorca	Barcelona
		Report		Stadium: Camp Nou

22 February 1998 26	Barcelona	2–0	Compostela	Barcelona
	Figo 14'; Enrique 29'	Report		Stadium: Camp Nou

2 March 1998 27	Racing de Santander	2–4	Barcelona	Santander
	Correa 10' (pen.); Alberto 80'	Report	Rivaldo 69' 72'; Anderson 82' 89'	Stadium: Estadio El Sardinero

7 March 1998 28	Barcelona	3–0	Real Madrid	Barcelona
	Anderson 69'; Figo 80'; Giovanni 85'	Report		Stadium: Camp Nou

15 March 1998 29	Real Valladolid	1–2	Barcelona	Valladolid
	Chema 12'	Report	Rivaldo 56'; Figo 89'	Stadium: Estadio Jose Zorrilla

22 March 1998 30	Barcelona	4–0	Athletic de Bilbao	Barcelona
	Giovanni 3'; Anderson 13' 47'; Óscar 79'	Report		Stadium: Camp Nou

29 March 1998 31	Celta de Vigo	3–1	Barcelona	Vigo
	Revivo 21'; Mostovoy 32'; Mazinho 70'	Report	Enrique 27'	Stadium: Estadio Balaídos

4 April 1998 32	Barcelona	2–1	Real Oviedo	Barcelona
	Enrique 31'; Bogarde 41'	Report	Bogarde 69' (o.g.)	Stadium: Camp Nou

7 April 1998 17	Real Betis	0–2	Barcelona	Sevilla
		Report	Giovanni 52'; Rivaldo 59'	Stadium: Estadio Benito Villamarin

11 April 1998 33	Mérida	1–2	Barcelona	Mérida
	Biagini 80'	Report	Figo 66'; Enrique 71'	Stadium: Estadio Romano

18 April 1998 34	Barcelona	1–0	Real Zaragoza	Barcelona
	Giovanni 77'	Report		Stadium: Camp Nou

25 April 1998 35	Espanyol	1–1	Barcelona	Barcelona
	Sergio 56'	Report	Figo 37'	Stadium: Estadi Olímpic Lluís Companys

3 May 1998 36	Barcelona	1–3	Real Betis	Barcelona
	Bogarde 24'	Report	Alfonso 44'; George 58' 89'	Stadium: Camp Nou

10 May 1998 37	Atlético de Madrid	5–2	Barcelona	Madrid
	Paunović 19'; Couto 25' (o.g.); Vieri 60' 82'; Caminero 70'	Report	Rivaldo 12' de la Peña 81'	Stadium: Estadio Vicente Calderón

15 May 1998 38	Barcelona	1–4	Salamanca	Barcelona
	Jofre 89'	Report	Silvani 18'; Pauleta 52' 55'; Brito 72'	Stadium: Camp Nou

=== Copa del Rey ===
==== Eight-finals ====
15 January 1998	Barcelona	2–1	Valencia	Barcelona
20:30	Enrique 4'; Rivaldo 66'		Gómez 37' (pen.)	Stadium: Camp Nou; Attendance: 55,000; Referee: Manuel Mejuto González

22 January 1998	Valencia	1–3	Barcelona	Valencia
20:30	Angloma 68'		Rivaldo 26' (pen.) 79'; Giovanni 90'	Stadium: Mestalla Stadium; Attendance: 48,000; Referee: Antonio López Nieto

==== Quarter-finals ====
5 February 1998	Barcelona	2–0	Mérida	Barcelona
21:00	Enrique 16'; Figo 79'			Stadium: Camp Nou; Attendance: 25,000; Referee: Víctor Esquinas Torres

11 February 1998	Mérida	0–3	Barcelona	Mérida
21:00			Barjuán 2'; Rivaldo 52' (pen.); Ćirić 80'	Stadium: Estadio Romano; Attendance: 15,000; Referee: José López De La Fuente

==== Semi-finals ====
18 February 1998	Barcelona	5–2	Real Zaragoza	Barcelona
20:30	Rivaldo 3' 6' 47'; Giovanni 11'; Enrique 20'		Garitano 1' 40'	Stadium: Camp Nou; Attendance: 45,000; Referee: Antonio López Nieto

26 February 1998	Real Zaragoza	0–0	Barcelona	Zaragoza
21:00				Stadium: La Romareda; Attendance: 34,000; Referee: Manuel Díaz Vega

==== Final ====
29 April 1998	Barcelona	1–1 (a.e.t.) (5–4 p)	Mallorca	Valencia; Stadium: Mestalla
21:00 CET	Rivaldo 66'		Stanković 6'	Attendance: 54,000; Referee: Daudén Ibáñez (Aragon)
	Penalties
	Rivaldo (penalty missed); Giovanni (penalty scored); Celades (penalty missed); Pizzi (penalty scored); Roger (penalty scored); Figo (penalty missed); Óscar (penalty scored); Reiziger (penalty scored)		(penalty missed) Iván Rocha; (penalty scored) Soler; (penalty missed) Campo; (penalty scored) Olaizola; (penalty scored) Roa; (penalty missed) Stanković; (penalty scored) Amato; (penalty missed) Eskurza

=== UEFA Champions League ===
==== Second qualifying round ====
13 August 1997	Barcelona (Spain)	3–2	(Latvia) Skonto	Camp Nou, Barcelona
21:30	Giovanni 27', 70'; Stoichkov 90' (pen.)	Report	Babicevs 26'; Abelardo 46' (o.g.)	Attendance: 50,000; Referee: Fernand Meese (Belgium)

27 August 1997	Skonto (Latvia)	0–1	(Spain) Barcelona	Daugava Stadium, Riga
20:00		Report	Anderson 50'	Attendance: 12,000; Referee: Terje Hauge (Norway)

==== Group stage ====
Pos	Team	Pld	W	D	L	GF	GA	GD	Pts	Qualification	DKV	PSV	NEW	BAR
1	(Ukraine) Dynamo Kyiv	6	3	2	1	13	6	+7	11	Advance to knockout stage	—	1–1	2–2	3–0
2	(Netherlands) PSV Eindhoven	6	2	3	1	9	8	+1	9		1–3	—	1–0	2–2
3	(England) Newcastle United	6	2	1	3	7	8	−1	7		2–0	0–2	—	3–2
4	(Spain) Barcelona	6	1	2	3	7	14	−7	5		0–4	2–2	1–0	—

Source: UEFA

17 September 1997	Newcastle United (England)	3–2	(Spain) Barcelona	St James' Park, Newcastle
20:45	Asprilla 22' (pen.), 31', 49'	Report	Luis Enrique 73'; Figo 89'	Attendance: 35,274; Referee: Pierluigi Collina (Italy)

1 October 1997	Barcelona (Spain)	2–2	(Netherlands) PSV Eindhoven	Camp Nou, Barcelona
20:45	Luis Enrique 61', 74'	Report	Cocu 70'; Møller 86'	Attendance: 82,000; Referee: Hellmut Krug (Germany)

22 October 1997	Dynamo Kyiv (Ukraine)	3–0	(Spain) Barcelona	Olympic Stadium, Kyiv
20:45	Rebrov 6'; Maximov 32'; Kalitvintsev 65'	Report		Attendance: 100,000; Referee: Markus Merk (Germany)

5 November 1997	Barcelona (Spain)	0–4	(Ukraine) Dynamo Kyiv	Camp Nou, Barcelona
20:45		Report	Shevchenko 9', 32', 44' (pen.); Rebrov 79'	Attendance: 52,200; Referee: Hugh Dallas (Scotland)

26 November 1997	Barcelona (Spain)	1–0	(England) Newcastle United	Camp Nou, Barcelona
20:45	Giovanni 17'	Report		Attendance: 26,000; Referee: Marc Batta (France)

10 December 1997	PSV Eindhoven (Netherlands)	2–2	(Spain) Barcelona	Philips Stadion, Eindhoven
20:45	Abelardo 54' (o.g.); De Bilde 56'	Report	Abelardo 32'; Giovanni 66'	Attendance: 29,400; Referee: Anders Frisk (Sweden)

=== Supercopa de España ===
20 August 1997	Barcelona	2–1	Real Madrid	Barcelona
21:30	Nadal 11'; Giovanni 85' (pen.)		Raúl 5'	Stadium: Camp Nou; Attendance: 120,000; Referee: Gracia Redondo

23 August 1997	Real Madrid	4–1	Barcelona	Madrid
22:00	Raúl 42' 54'; Mijatović 58'; Seedorf 65'	Report	Giovanni 80'	Stadium: Santiago Bernabéu; Attendance: 70,000; Referee: Dauden Ibáñez

=== UEFA Super Cup ===
8 January 1998	Barcelona	2–0	Borussia Dortmund	Barcelona
21:00	Enrique 8'; Rivaldo 61' (pen.)			Stadium: Camp Nou; Attendance: 50,000; Referee: David Elleray

11 March 1998	Borussia Dortmund	1–1	Barcelona	Dortmund
20:00	Heinrich 64'	Report	Giovanni 8'	Stadium: Westfalenstadion; Attendance: 32,500; Referee: Piero Ceccarini

== Friendlies ==
GAMES
24-3-1998 COPA CATALUNYA LLEIDA-BARCELONA 1–2

5-5-1998 COPA CATALUNYA BARCELONA-EUROPA 1–1 /3–4/ PENALTY

25-7-1997 FRIENDLY ELFSBORG-BARCELONA 0–3

3-8-1997 FRIENDLY AZ-BARCELONA 1–2

6-8-1997 FRIENDLY TWENTE-BARCELONA 0–1

9-8-1997 FRIENDLY MALLORCA-BARCELONA 1-1

16-8-1997 Joan Gamper Trophy BARCELONA-SAMPDORIA 2–2 /6–5/ PENALTY

27-1-1998 FRIENDLY BARCELONA-PARTIZAN 1–0

12-5-1998 FRIENDLY BARCELONA-SOUTHAMPTON 4–0

== Statistics ==
=== Players statistics ===
No.	Pos	Nat	Player	Total		La Liga		Copa del Rey		UEFA Champions League	
No.	Pos	Nat	Player	Apps	Goals	Apps	Goals	Apps	Goals	Apps	Goals
13	GK	(Netherlands) NED	Hesp	50	-63	36	-47	7	-5	7	-11
22	DF	(Netherlands) NED	Reiziger	41	0	25+4	0	4	0	8	0
2	DF	(Spain) ESP	Ferrer	34	0	21+3	0	4	0	4+2	0
17	DF	(Netherlands) NED	Bogarde	22	2	19	2	3	0	0	0
12	DF	(Spain) ESP	Sergi	43	3	31	2	6	1	6	0
7	MF	(Portugal) POR	Figo	48	7	35	5	6	1	7	1
10	MF	(Brazil) BRA	Giovanni	37	15	21+6	9	4+1	2	5	4
26	MF	(Spain) ESP	Celades	48	0	34+2	0	7	0	5	0
21	MF	(Spain) ESP	Luis Enrique	44	24	34	18	6	3	4	3
9	FW	(Brazil) BRA	Anderson	33	11	20+3	10	4+1	0	5	1
11	FW	(Brazil) BRA	Rivaldo	47	27	34	19	7	8	6	0
1	GK	(Portugal) POR	Baia	3	-12	2	-8	0	0	1	-4
20	DF	(Spain) ESP	Nadal	31	0	18+3	0	4+1	0	3+2	0
5	DF	(Portugal) POR	Couto	25	0	13+5	0	1+1	0	4+1	0
23	MF	(Spain) ESP	Iván de la Peña	21	2	13+4	2	2	0	2	0
3	DF	(Spain) ESP	Abelardo	21	1	13+2	0	3	0	3	1
6	MF	(Spain) ESP	Óscar	22	5	11+5	5	3+1	0	2	0
18	MF	(Spain) ESP	Amor	30	0	10+12	0	2+2	0	1+3	0
27	MF	(Spain) ESP	Roger	25	0	7+11	0	2+3	0	2	0
16	MF	(Federal Republic of Yugoslavia) YUG	Ciric	32	1	6+15	0	1+2	1	5+3	0
4	MF	(Spain) ESP	Guardiola	12	0	5+1	0	1	0	4+1	0
19	FW	(Spain) ESP	Pizzi	23	3	4+11	3	0+4	0	0+4	0
15	FW	(France) FRA	Dugarry	11	0	4+3	0	0	0	1+3	0
8	FW	(Bulgaria) BUL	Stoichkov	5	1	1+1	0	0+1	0	0+2	1
25	GK	(Spain) ESP	Busquets	2	-2	1	-1	0	0	1	-1
14	MF	(Nigeria) NGR	Amunike	0	0	0	0	0	0	0	0
28	DF	(Spain) ESP	Puyol	0	0	0	0	0	0	0	0
29	MF	(Spain) ESP	Xavi	0	0	0	0	0	0	0	0
31	MF	(Spain) ESP	Rosas	1	0	1	0	0	0	0	0
32	MF	(Spain) ESP	Jofre	1	1	0+1	1	0	0	0	0

== See also ==
- FC Barcelona
- 1997–98 UEFA Champions League
- 1997–98 La Liga
- 1997–98 Copa del Rey
- Spanish Super Cup
