= 1998 Copa del Rey final =

Copa del Rey 1998 final
- Event: 1997–98 Copa del Rey
Barcelona	Mallorca
1	1
- After extra time Barcelona won 5–4 on penalties
- Date: 29 April 1998
- Venue: Mestalla, Valencia
- Referee: Arturo Daudén Ibáñez
- Attendance: 54,000

The 1998 Copa del Rey final was the 96th final of the Spanish cup competition, the Copa del Rey. The final was played at the Mestalla Stadium in Valencia on 29 April 1998. The game was won by Barcelona 5–4 on penalties, after a 1–1 draw following extra time.

== Details ==
29 April 1998
21:00 CET

Barcelona	1–1 (a.e.t.)	Mallorca
Rivaldo 66'	Report	Stanković 6'
Penalties
Rivaldo (penalty missed); Giovanni (penalty scored); Celades (penalty missed); Pizzi (penalty scored); Roger (penalty scored); Figo (penalty missed); Óscar (penalty scored); Reiziger (penalty scored)	5–4	(penalty missed) Rocha; (penalty scored) Soler; (penalty missed) Campo; (penalty scored) Olaizola; (penalty scored) Roa; (penalty missed) Stanković; (penalty scored) Amato; (penalty missed) Eskurza

Mestalla, Valencia
Attendance: 54,000
Referee: Arturo Daudén Ibáñez

Barcelona	Mallorca

GK	13	(Netherlands) Ruud Hesp
RB	22	(Netherlands) Michael Reiziger
CB	2	(Spain) Albert Ferrer	(yellow card) 54'	(substituted off) 50'
CB	20	(Spain) Miguel Ángel Nadal	(yellow card) 77'
LB	17	(Netherlands) Winston Bogarde
DM	26	(Spain) Albert Celades
RM	7	(Portugal) Luís Figo (c)	(yellow card) 111'
CM	11	(Brazil) Rivaldo	(yellow card) 2'
CM	10	(Brazil) Giovanni
LM	21	(Spain) Luis Enrique		(substituted off) 106'
CF	9	(Brazil) Sonny Anderson		(substituted off) 76'
Substitutes:
GK	1	(Portugal) Vítor Baía
DF	5	(Portugal) Fernando Couto
DF	27	(Spain) Roger	(yellow card) 62'	(substituted on) 50'
MF	6	(Spain) Óscar		(substituted on) 106'
FW	19	(Argentina) Juan Antonio Pizzi		(substituted on) 76'
Manager:
(Netherlands) Louis van Gaal

GK	17	(Argentina) Carlos Roa
RB	14	(Spain) Javier Olaizola (c)
CB	5	(Spain) Marcelino	(yellow card) 1'
CB	12	(Spain) Iván Campo	(yellow card) 84'
LB	21	(Spain) Enrique Romero	(yellow card) 84' (red card) 93'
DM	23	(Spain) Vicente Engonga	(yellow card) 46'	(substituted off) 69'
RM	2	(Argentina) Óscar Mena	(red card) 84'
LM	19	(Spain) Juan Carlos Valerón	(yellow card) 76'	(substituted off) 91'
AM	11	(Federal Republic of Yugoslavia) Jovan Stanković
CF	10	(Spain) Santiago Ezquerro		(substituted off) 71'
CF	9	(Argentina) Gabriel Amato
Substitutes:
GK	1	(Spain) Kike Burgos
DF	3	(Brazil) Iván Rocha		(substituted on) 91'
MF	15	(Spain) Paco Soler		(substituted on) 71'
MF	18	(Spain) Xabier Eskurza	(yellow card) 117'	(substituted on) 69'
FW	16	(Spain) José Gálvez
Manager:
(Argentina) Héctor Cúper

Match rules

- 90 minutes.
- 30 minutes of extra-time if necessary.
- Penalty shoot-out if scores still level.
- Five named substitutes.
- Maximum of three substitutions.
