= Milan Milijaš =

Serbian footballer

Personal information
- Full name: Milan Milijaš
- Date of birth: 12 October 1976 (age 50)
- Place of birth: Zemun, SR Serbia, SFR Yugoslavia
- Height: 1.82 m (6 ft 0 in)
- Position: Defender

Youth career
- Zemun

Senior career*
Years	Team	Apps	(Gls)
1995–1997	Zemun	66	(2)
1997–1998	Mallorca	0	(0)
1998–1999	Málaga	5	(0)
2000–2001	Partizan	4	(0)
2001–2004	Zemun	46	(0)
2004–2005	OFK Beograd	6	(0)
2005–2007	Voždovac	28	(0)
Total		155	(2)

International career
1996–1997	FR Yugoslavia U21	8	(0)

Managerial career
- 2013–2014: Zemun
- * Club domestic league appearances and goals

Milan Milijaš (Serbian Cyrillic: Милан Милијаш; born 12 October 1976) is a Serbian former professional footballer who played as a defender.

== Club career ==
Milijaš came through the youth system of Zemun and made his league debut in 1995. He amassed 66 appearances and netted two goals in the top flight over the course of two-and-a-half seasons, before completing a move to La Liga side Mallorca in November 1997. Under manager Héctor Cúper, Milijaš played one Copa del Rey game in the remainder of the season. He was subsequently transferred to Segunda División club Málaga.

In September 2000, Milijaš returned to his homeland and signed a three-year contract with Partizan. He later rejoined his parent club Zemun. Before hanging up his boots, Milijaš also played for OFK Beograd and Voždovac.

== International career ==
Milijaš was capped for FR Yugoslavia at under-21 level from 1996 to 1997.

== Post-playing career ==
In April 2013, Milijaš was appointed as manager of Zemun. He subsequently joined the technical staff of Partizan in January 2015.

== Personal life ==
Milijaš is the cousin of fellow footballer Nenad Milijaš.

== Career statistics ==
Club	Season	League	
Club	Season	Apps	Goals
Zemun	1995–96	25	0
Zemun	1996–97	29	2
Zemun	1997–98	12	0
Zemun	Total	66	2
Mallorca	1997–98	0	0
Málaga	1998–99	5	0
Partizan	2000–01	4	0
Zemun	2001–02	13	0
Zemun	2002–03	20	0
Zemun	2003–04	13	0
Zemun	Total	46	0
OFK Beograd	2004–05	6	0
Voždovac	2005–06	24	0
Voždovac	2006–07	4	0
Voždovac	Total	28	0
Career total		155	2

== Honours ==
Partizan

- FR Yugoslavia Cup: 2000–01
