= 1997–98 Copa del Rey =

96th Copa del Rey

Tournament details
- Country: Spain
- Dates: 3 September 1997 – 29 April 1998
- Teams: 66

Final positions
- Champions: Barcelona
- Runners-up: Mallorca

Tournament statistics
- Matches played: 129
- Goals scored: 317 (2.46 per match)
- Top goal scorer: Rivaldo (8)

The 1997–98 Copa del Rey was the 96th staging of the Copa del Rey.

The competition started on 3 September 1997 and concluded on 29 April 1998 with the final, held at the Mestalla Stadium in Valencia.

== Format ==
Schedule
Round	Fixture	Clubs	Gain entry
First round	23	66 → 43	Teams from: 2ª División and 2ª División B
Second round	18	43 → 25	Teams from: 1ª División
Third round	9	25 → 16	
Round of 16	8	16 → 8	Teams playing European competitions (*)
Quarter-finals	4	8 → 4	
Semi-finals	2	4 → 2	
Final	1	2 → 1	

Teams
Division	No. clubs
1ª División	20
2ª División	21
2ª División B	25
Total teams	66

- All rounds are played over two legs apart the final which is played a single match in a neutral venue.
- In the event that aggregate scores finish level, the away goals rule. (This rule applies also in extra time)
- In case of a tie on aggregate, will play an extra time of 30 minutes, and if no goals are scored during extra time, the tie is decided by penalty shootout.
- The winners of the competition will earn a place in the group stage of next season's UEFA Cup Winners' Cup, if they have not already qualified for European competition, if so then the runners-up will instead take this berth.
- The teams that play European competitions are exempt until the round of 16.
- Reserve teams are excluded from the tournament.

(*) Athletic Bilbao, Atlético Madrid, Barcelona, Deportivo La Coruña, Real Betis, Real Madrid, Valladolid from 1ª División.

== First round ==
First round
Home 1st leg	Agg.	Home 2nd leg	1st leg			2nd leg			Notes
Caudal (2)	3–3 (a)	Ourense(2)	3 Sep 1997	2–3	Rep.	10 Sep 1997	0–1	Rep.	
Lemona (3)	1–2	Eibar(2)	3 Sep 1997	0–1	Rep.	10 Sep 1997	1–1	Rep.	
Barakaldo(3)	1–4	Osasuna(2)	3 Sep 1997	1–0	Rep.	10 Sep 1997	4–0	Rep.	
Burgos(3)	3–1	Logroñés(2)	3 Sep 1997	1–0	Rep.	10 Sep 1997	1–2	Rep.	
Aurrerá(3)	1–2	Alavés (2)	3 Sep 1997	1–0	Rep.	10 Sep 1997	2–0	Rep.	
Zamora(3)	4–5 (aet)	Numancia(2)	3 Sep 1997	1–3	Rep.	10 Sep 1997	2–3	Rep.	
Endesa Andorra (3)	1–6	Lleida(2)	3 Sep 1997	0–3	Rep.	10 Sep 1997	3–1	Rep.	
Gimnàstic(3)	0–3	Figueres(3)	3 Sep 1997	0–2	Rep.	10 Sep 1997	1–0	Rep.	
Gramenet(3)	2–2 (a)	Sóller(3)	3 Sep 1997	1–2	Rep.	10 Sep 1997	0–1	Rep.	
Plasencia(3)	1–2	Extremadura(2)	3 Sep 1997	1–1	Rep.	10 Sep 1997	1–0	Rep.	
Moralo(3)	1–1 (a)	Badajoz(2)	3 Sep 1997	1–1	Rep.	10 Sep 1997	0–0	Rep.	
Leganés (3)	1–2	Rayo Vallecano(2)	3 Sep 1997	0–0	Rep.	10 Sep 1997	2–1	Rep.	
Manchego (3)	4–6 (aet)	Albacete(2)	3 Sep 1997	1–3	Rep.	10 Sep 1997	3–3	Rep.	
Talavera (3)	0–2	Toledo(2)	3 Sep 1997	0–0	Rep.	10 Sep 1997	2–0	Rep.	
Ontinyent(3)	2–4	Hércules(2)	3 Sep 1997	1–2	Rep.	10 Sep 1997	2–1	Rep.	
Novelda(3)	5–4	Levante(2)	3 Sep 1997	4–4	Rep.	10 Sep 1997	0–1	Rep.	
Elche(2)	1–0	Villarreal(2)	3 Sep 1997	0–0	Rep.	10 Sep 1997	0–1	Rep.	
Écija(3)	2–3	Xerez (2)	3 Sep 1997	2–1	Rep.	10 Sep 1997	2–0	Rep.	
Isla Cristina (3)	4–4 (a)	Sevilla(2)	3 Sep 1997	1–2	Rep.	10 Sep 1997	2–3	Rep.	
Recreativo Huelva(3)	4–2	Córdoba(3)	3 Sep 1997	1–1	Rep.	10 Sep 1997	1–3	Rep.	
Almería(3)	2–2 (a)	Real Jaén(2)	3 Sep 1997	2–1	Rep.	10 Sep 1997	1–0	Rep.	
Motril(3)	0–2	Lorca(3)	3 Sep 1997	0–1	Rep.	10 Sep 1997	1–0	Rep.	
Pájara Playas de Jandía(3)	4–5	Las Palmas(2)	3 Sep 1997	3–1	Rep.	10 Sep 1997	4–1	Rep.	
Bye: Athletic Bilbao, Atlético Madrid, Barcelona, Deportivo La Coruña, Betis, Real Madrid, Valladolid.

== Second round ==
Second round
Home 1st leg	Agg.	Home 2nd leg	1st leg			2nd leg			Notes
Ourense(2)	1–3 (aet)	Celta Vigo(1)	8 Oct 1997	0–1	Rep.	28 Oct 1997	2–1	Rep.	
Alavés(2)	1–0	Oviedo(1)	8 Oct 1997	1–0	Rep.	29 Oct 1997	0–0	Rep.	
Eibar (2)	0–1	Compostela(1)	8 Oct 1997	0–0	Rep.	29 Oct 1997	1–0	Rep.	
Numancia(2)	2–3	Racing Santander(1)	8 Oct 1997	2–2	Rep.	29 Oct 1997	1–0	Rep.	
Burgos(3)	0–2	Real Sociedad(1)	7 Oct 1997	0–2	Rep.	29 Oct 1997	0–0	Rep.	
Osasuna(2)	2–1	Sporting Gijón(1)	8 Oct 1997	1–1	Rep.	29 Oct 1997	0–1	Rep.	
Figueres(3)	3–2	Espanyol(1)	8 Oct 1997	1–1	Rep.	29 Oct 1997	1–2	Rep.	
Lleida(2)	2–3	Zaragoza(1)	8 Oct 1997	1–1	Rep.	29 Oct 1997	2–1	Rep.	
Badajoz(2)	0–3	Mérida(1)	9 Oct 1997	0–0	Rep.	29 Oct 1997	3–0	Rep.	
Toledo(2)	0–3	Salamanca(1)	8 Oct 1997	0–1	Rep.	29 Oct 1997	2–0	Rep.	
Rayo Vallecano(2)	0–1	Extremadura(2)	8 Oct 1997	0–1	Rep.	29 Oct 1997	0–0	Rep.	
Hércules(2)	0–4	Valencia (1)	8 Oct 1997	0–3	Rep.	29 Oct 1997	1–0	Rep.	
Novelda(3)	1–0	Elche(2)	8 Oct 1997	1–0	Rep.	29 Oct 1997	0–0	Rep.	
Lorca(3)	4–4 (a)	Albacete(2)	8 Oct 1997	0–2	Rep.	29 Oct 1997	2–4	Rep.	
Sóller(3)	1–7	Mallorca(1)	8 Oct 1997	1–1	Rep.	29 Oct 1997	6–0	Rep.	
Xerez(2)	1–1 (a)	Real Jaén(2)	8 Oct 1997	0–0	Rep.	29 Oct 1997	1–1	Rep.	
Isla Cristina(3)	1–4	Recreativo Huelva(3)	8 Oct 1997	1–2	Rep.	29 Oct 1997	2–0	Rep.	
Las Palmas(2)	5–4	Tenerife(1)	8 Oct 1997	3–2	Rep.	29 Oct 1997	2–2	Rep.	
Bye: Athletic Bilbao, Atlético Madrid, Barcelona, Deportivo La Coruña, Betis, Real Madrid, Valladolid.

== Third round ==
Third round
Home 1st leg	Agg.	Home 2nd leg	1st leg			2nd leg			Notes
Las Palmas (1)	4–4 (a)	Mallorca(1)	2 Dec 1997	3–2	Rep.	7 Jan 1998	2–1	Rep.	
Recreativo Huelva(3)	2–6	Celta Vigo(1)	3 Dec 1997	0–1	Rep.	7 Jan 1998	5–2	Rep.	
Figueres(3)	2–3 (aet)	Valencia(1)	3 Dec 1997	1–1	Rep.	7 Jan 1998	2–1	Rep.	
Novelda(3)	3–7	Zaragoza(1)	3 Dec 1997	2–2	Rep.	7 Jan 1998	5–1	Rep.	
Lorca(3)	3–4	Mérida(1)	3 Dec 1997	2–0	Rep.	7 Jan 1998	4–1	Rep.	
Alavés(2)	3–2	Compostela(1)	3 Dec 1997	1–0	Rep.	6 Jan 1998	2–2	Rep.	
Xerez(2)	3–4	Real Sociedad(1)	4 Dec 1997	1–0	Rep.	7 Jan 1998	4–2	Rep.	
Osasuna(2)	3–2	Racing Santander(1)	3 Dec 1997	3–0	Rep.	7 Jan 1998	2–0	Rep.	
Extremadura(2)	2–2 (a)	Salamanca(1)	3 Dec 1997	1–0	Rep.	8 Jan 1998	2–1	Rep.	
Bye: Athletic Bilbao, Atlético Madrid, Barcelona, Deportivo La Coruña, Betis, Real Madrid, Valladolid.

== Bracket ==
First round
1	(Catalonia) Barcelona	2	3	5
16	(Valencian Community) Valencia	1	1	2
8	(Castile and León) Valladolid	1	1	2
9	(Extremadura) Mérida	1	3	4
5	(Aragon) Zaragoza	2	1	3
12	(Community of Madrid) Atlético Madrid	0	2	2
4	(Basque Country (autonomous community)) Real Sociedad	0	1	2
13	(Andalusia) Betis	2	1	3
6	(Basque Country (autonomous community)) Alavés (a)	1	1	2
11	(Community of Madrid) Real Madrid	0	2	2
3	(Navarre) Osasuna	0	1	1
14	(Galicia (Spain)) Deportivo La Coruña	1	2	3
7	Extremadura	2	1	3
10	(Basque Country (autonomous community)) Athletic Bilbao	0	4	4
2	(Balearic Islands) Mallorca (a)	1	1	2
15	(Galicia (Spain)) Celta Vigo	0	2	2

Quarter-finals
(Catalonia) Barcelona	2	3	5
(Extremadura) Mérida	0	0	0
(Aragon) Zaragoza	3	2	5
(Andalusia) Betis	0	2	2
(Basque Country (autonomous community)) Alavés	3	0	3
(Galicia (Spain)) Deportivo La Coruña	1	0	1
(Basque Country (autonomous community)) Athletic Bilbao	2	0	2
(Balearic Islands) Mallorca (a)	1	1	2

Semi-finals
(Catalonia) Barcelona	5	0	5
(Aragon) Zaragoza	2	0	2
(Basque Country (autonomous community)) Alavés	1	0	1
(Balearic Islands) Mallorca	2	1	3

Final
(Catalonia) Barcelona (5–4 p)	1
(Balearic Islands) Mallorca	1

== Round of 16 ==
Team 1	Agg.	Team 2	1st leg	2nd leg
Barcelona(1) (Catalonia)	5–2	(Valencian Community) Valencia(1)	2–1	3–1
Valladolid(1) (Castile and León)	2–4	(Extremadura) Mérida(1)	1–1	1–3
Zaragoza(1) (Aragon)	3–2	(Community of Madrid) Atlético Madrid(1)	2–0	1–2
Real Sociedad(1) (Basque Country (autonomous community))	1–3	(Andalusia) Betis(1)	0–2	1–1
Alavés(2) (Basque Country (autonomous community))	2–2 (a)	(Community of Madrid) Real Madrid(1)	1–0	1–2
Osasuna(2) (Navarre)	1–3	(Galicia (Spain)) Deportivo La Coruña(1)	0–1	1–2
Extremadura (2)	3–4	(Basque Country (autonomous community)) Athletic Bilbao(1)	2–0	1–4
Mallorca(1) (Balearic Islands)	2–2 (a)	(Galicia (Spain)) Celta Vigo(1)	1–0	1–2

=== First leg ===
13 January 1998	Alavés(2)	1–0	Real Madrid(1)	Vitoria-Gasteiz
21:30 CET	Serrano 70'	Report (in Spanish)		Stadium: Mendizorrotza; Attendance: 18,000; Referee: Daudén Ibáñez (Aragon)

14 January 1998	Real Sociedad(1)	0–2	Betis(1)	San Sebastián
20:15 CET		Report (in Spanish)	Finidi 30'; Pérez 90+1'	Stadium: Anoeta; Attendance: 16,000; Referee: Carmona Méndez (Extremadura)

14 January 1998	Osasuna(2)	0–1	Deportivo La Coruña(1)	Pamplona
20:30 CET		Report (in Spanish)	Abreu 50'	Stadium: El Sadar; Attendance: 15,000; Referee: Japón Sevilla (Andalusia)

14 January 1998	Zaragoza(1)	2–0	Atlético Madrid(1)	Zaragoza
20:45 CET	José Ignacio 7'; Pier 90'	Report (in Spanish)	Andrei (red card) 77'	Stadium: La Romareda; Attendance: — Referee: Díaz Vega (Asturias)

14 January 1998	Valladolid(1)	1–1	Mérida(1)	Valladolid
21:00 CET	Eusebio 60'	Report (in Spanish)	Biagini 69'	Stadium: Nuevo José Zorrilla; Attendance: 23,000; Referee: Losantos Omar (Basque Country (autonomous community))

14 January 1998	Extremadura(2)	2–0	Athletic Bilbao(1)	Almendralejo
21:00 CET	Rueda 59'; Manuel 70'	Report (in Spanish)	Nagore (red card) 60'; Larrazábal (red card) 73'	Stadium: Francisco de la Hera; Attendance: 10,500; Referee: Pérez Burrull (Cantabria)

14 January 1998	Mallorca(1)	1–0	Celta Vigo(1)	Palma
21:15 CET	Marcelino 84'	Report (in Spanish)		Stadium: Lluís Sitjar; Attendance: 10,357; Referee: Iturralde González (Basque Country (autonomous community))

15 January 1998	Barcelona(1)	2–1	Valencia(1)	Barcelona
21:30 CET	Luis Enrique 4'; Rivaldo 66'	Report (in Spanish)	Fernando 37' (pen.)	Stadium: Camp Nou; Attendance: 55,000; Referee: Mejuto González (Asturias)

=== Second leg ===
20 January 1998	Atlético Madrid	2–1	Zaragoza	Madrid
21:30 CET	Juninho 29'; Kiko 37'	Report (in Spanish)	José Ignacio 84'	Stadium: Vicente Calderón; Attendance: 45,000; Referee: Prados García (Andalusia)

21 January 1998	Athletic Bilbao	4–1	Extremadura	Bilbao
20:30 CET	Urzaiz 13'; Etxeberria 49', 55'; Ziganda 59'	Report (in Spanish)	Rueda 40'	Stadium: San Mamés; Attendance: 45,000; Referee: Rodriguez Martel (Canary Islands)

21 January 1998	Deportivo La Coruña	2–1	Osasuna	A Coruña
20:45 CET	Djalminha 65'; Bassir 80'	Report (in Spanish)	Palacios 84'	Stadium: Riazor; Attendance: 18,000; Referee: Fernández González (Asturias)

21 January 1998	Real Madrid	2–1	Alavés	Madrid
21:00 CET	Roberto Carlos 13'; Šuker 55'	Report (in Spanish)	Riesco 10'	Stadium: Santiago Bernabéu; Attendance: 35,000; Referee: Andradas Asurmendi (Navarre)

21 January 1998	Mérida	3–1	Valladolid	Mérida
21:00 CET	Canabal 6' (o.g.); Jaime 53'; Sabas 68'	Report (in Spanish)	Klimowicz 11'	Stadium: Romano José Fouto; Attendance: 11,500; Referee: Puentes Leira (Galicia (Spain))

21 January 1998	Celta Vigo	2–1	Mallorca	Vigo
21:00 CET	Mostovoi 42'; Moisés 52' (pen.)	Report (in Spanish)	Ezquerro 77'	Stadium: Balaídos; Attendance: 23,000; Referee: Brito Arceo (Canary Islands)

21 January 1998	Betis	1–1	Real Sociedad	Seville
21:30 CET	Oli 23'	Report (in Spanish)	Aldeondo 80'	Stadium: Benito Villamarín; Attendance: 20,000; Referee: Ansuátegui Roca (Valencian Community)

22 January 1998	Valencia	1–3	Barcelona	Valencia
21:30 CET	Angloma 68'	Report (in Spanish)	Rivaldo 26' (pen.), 79'; Giovanni 90+1'	Stadium: Mestalla; Attendance: 48,000; Referee: López Nieto (Andalusia)

== Quarter-finals ==
Team 1	Agg.	Team 2	1st leg	2nd leg
Barcelona(1) (Catalonia)	5–0	(Extremadura) Mérida(1)	2–0	3–0
Zaragoza(1) (Aragon)	5–2	(Andalusia) Betis(1)	3–0	2–2
Alavés(2) (Basque Country (autonomous community))	3–1	(Galicia (Spain)) Deportivo La Coruña(1)	3–1	0–0
Athletic Bilbao (1) (Basque Country (autonomous community))	2–2 (a)	(Balearic Islands) Mallorca(1)	2–1	0–1

=== First leg ===
3 February 1998	Athletic Bilbao	2–1	Mallorca	Bilbao
21:30 CET	Urzaiz 6'; Alkiza 50'	Report (in Spanish)	Monchu 21'	Stadium: San Mamés; Attendance: 36,000; Referee: Gracia Redondo (Aragon)

4 February 1998	Alavés	3–1	Deportivo La Coruña	Vitoria-Gasteiz
19:15 CET	Begoña 8'; Riesco 25'; Moreno 70'	Report (in Spanish)	Donato 32' (pen.)	Stadium: Mendizorrotza; Attendance: 8,500; Referee: García-Aranda (Community of Madrid)

4 February 1998	Zaragoza	3–0	Betis	Zaragoza
21:30 CET	Acuña 13'; Pier 34'; Garitano 71'	Report (in Spanish)		Stadium: La Romareda; Attendance: 22,000; Referee: Losantos Omar (Basque Country (autonomous community))

5 February 1998	Barcelona	2–0	Mérida	Barcelona
22:00 CET	Luis Enrique 16'; Figo 79'	Report (in Spanish)		Stadium: Camp Nou; Attendance: 25,000; Referee: Esquinas Torres (Community of Madrid)

=== Second leg ===
10 February 1998	Mallorca	1–0	Athletic Bilbao	Palma
22:00 CET	Stanković 67'	Report (in Spanish)		Stadium: Lluís Sitjar; Attendance: 20,000; Referee: Ansuátegui Roca (Valencian Community)

11 February 1998	Deportivo La Coruña	0–0	Alavés	A Coruña
19:30 CET		Report (in Spanish)		Stadium: Riazor; Attendance: 22,000; Referee: Díaz Vega (Asturias)

11 February 1998	Mérida	0–3	Barcelona	Mérida
22:00 CET		Report (in Spanish)	Sergi 2'; Rivaldo 52' (pen.); Ćirić 80'	Stadium: Romano José Fouto; Attendance: 15,000; Referee: López de La Fuente (Galicia (Spain))

12 February 1998	Betis	2–2	Zaragoza	Seville
21:30 CET	Alfonso 43'; Finidi 64'	Report (in Spanish)	Jamelli 15'; Pier 17'	Stadium: Benito Villamarín; Attendance: 30,000; Referee: Fernández Marín (Valencian Community)

== Semi-finals ==
Team 1	Agg.	Team 2	1st leg	2nd leg
Barcelona(1) (Catalonia)	5–2	(Aragon) Zaragoza(1)	5–2	0–0
Alavés(2) (Basque Country (autonomous community))	1–3	(Balearic Islands) Mallorca(1)	1–2	0–1

=== First leg ===
18 February 1998	Barcelona	5–2	Zaragoza	Barcelona
21:30 CET	Rivaldo 3', 6', 47'; Giovanni 11'; Luis Enrique 20'	Report (in Spanish)	Garitano 1', 40'	Stadium: Camp Nou; Attendance: 45,000; Referee: López Nieto (Andalusia)

19 February 1998	Alavés	1–2	Mallorca	Vitoria-Gasteiz
22:00 CET	Gómez 49'	Report (in Spanish)	Ezquerro 45+1'; Stanković 82'	Stadium: Mendizorrotza; Attendance: 9,000; Referee: Brito Arceo (Canary Islands)

=== Second leg ===
25 February 1998	Mallorca	1–0	Alavés	Palma
21:30 CET	Gálvez 89'	Report (in Spanish)		Stadium: Lluís Sitjar; Attendance: 22,382; Referee: Fernández Marín (Valencian Community)

26 February 1998	Zaragoza	0–0	Barcelona	Zaragoza
22:00 CET	Aguado (red card) 88'	Report (in Spanish)		Stadium: La Romareda; Attendance: 34,000; Referee: Díaz Vega (Asturias)

== Final ==
29 April 1998
21:00 CET

Barcelona(1)	1–1 (a.e.t.)	Mallorca(1)
Rivaldo 66'	Report (in Spanish)	Stanković 6'; Mena (red card) 84'; Romero (red card) 90+3'
Penalties
Rivaldo (penalty missed); Giovanni (penalty scored); Celades (penalty missed); Pizzi (penalty scored); Roger (penalty scored); Figo (penalty missed); Óscar (penalty scored); Reiziger (penalty scored)	5–4	(penalty missed) Iván Rocha; (penalty scored) Soler; (penalty missed) Campo; (penalty scored) Olaizola; (penalty scored) Roa; (penalty missed) Stanković; (penalty scored) Amato; (penalty missed) Eskurza

Valencia
Stadium: Mestalla
Attendance: 54,000
Referee: Daudén Ibáñez (Aragon)

Copa del Rey
1997–98 winners
Barcelona
24th title

== Top goalscorers ==
Player	Goals	Team
(Brazil) Rivaldo	8	Barcelona
(Spain) Pier	5	Zaragoza
(Federal Republic of Yugoslavia) Jovan Stanković	5	Mallorca
(Argentina) Turu Flores	4	Las Palmas
(Spain) Pablo Gómez	4	Alavés
(Spain) Pepe Gálvez	4	Mallorca
(Spain) José Ignacio	4	Zaragoza
(Spain) Bolo	4	Hércules
(Bosnia and Herzegovina) Vladimir Gudelj	4	Celta Vigo
(Argentina) Luis Rueda	4	Extremadura
