= Gabriel Amato =

Argentine footballer (born 1970)

Personal information
- Full name: Gabriel Omar Amato
- Date of birth: 22 October 1970 (age 56)
- Place of birth: Mar del Plata, Argentina
- Height: 1.82 m (5 ft 11 1/2 in)
- Position: Striker

Senior career*
Years	Team	Apps	(Gls)
1989–1990	Aldosivi	27	(9)
1990–1991	Gimnasia LP	22	(5)
1991–1992	Boca Juniors	27	(2)
1992–1993	Independiente	38	(7)
1993	Huracán	19	(7)
1994–1996	River Plate	61	(13)
1996–1997	Hércules	36	(2)
1997–1998	Mallorca	35	(13)
1998–2000	Rangers	29	(9)
2000	Grêmio	35	(14)
2000–2002	Betis	62	(21)
2002–2003	Levante	39	(14)
2003	Albacete	8	(0)
2004	Banfield	19	(5)
Total		457	(121)

Managerial career
- 2017–2018: Guadalajara (Asst. Manager)
- * Club domestic league appearances and goals

Gabriel Omar Amato (born 22 October 1970) is an Argentine retired footballer who played as a striker.

== Football career ==
Born in Mar del Plata, Buenos Aires Province, Amato began his senior career with local Aldosivi. In his first seven seasons as a professional, he represented six clubs, also wearing the shirts of Gimnasia LP, Boca Juniors, Independiente, Huracán and River Plate.

In 1996, Amato moved to Spain where he would remain for the better part of following eight years: he started with Hércules, but only scored twice in more than 2,000 minutes of action as his club was relegated from La Liga.

Amato joined Mallorca for the 1997–98 campaign, sharing teams with countrymen Héctor Cúper (manager), Óscar Mena and Carlos Roa as the team – freshly promoted to the top level – overachieved for a final third position in the league table with him as its top scorer. The Balearic Islands side also reached the final of the Copa del Rey against Barcelona, where he assisted Jovan Stanković in the 1–1 equalizer and also converted his penalty shootout attempt, but in an eventual loss.

In-between his stint in the country, Amato spent two seasons in the Scottish Premier League with Rangers, signing for £4.2 million. In his first competitive game for Rangers, a remarkable UEFA Cup tie away to League of Ireland side Shelbourne (although played at Tranmere Rovers' Prenton Park), Amato marked his debut by scoring twice as Rangers came back from 3–0 down to win the match 5–3. He netted 13 times in 45 official contests during his time with the club, winning the title on both occasions and adding the 1999 edition of the Scottish Cup; on 15 May 1999, he scored a hat-trick in a 5–1 away routing of Motherwell, one of the goals coming through a penalty.

After one year in Brazil with Grêmio, Amato played a further three-and-a-half seasons in Spain. Midway through the 2003–04 season, he left Albacete and joined Banfield, retiring shortly after at the age of 34.
