= Héctor Cúper =

Argentine football manager (born 1955)

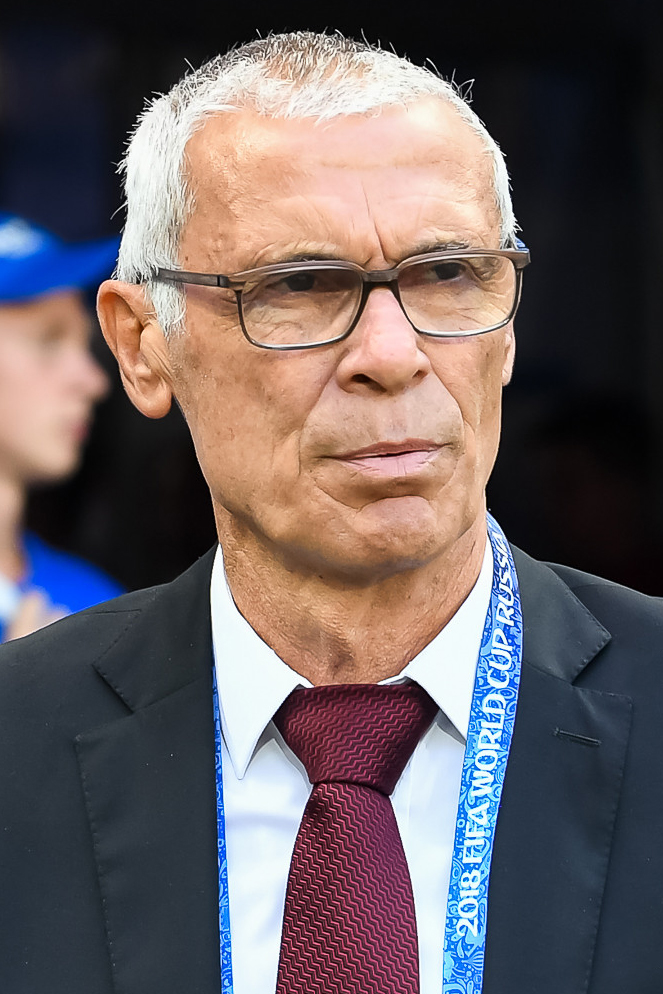
- Cúper as Egypt manager at the 2018 FIFA World Cup

Personal information
- Full name: Héctor Raúl Cúper
- Date of birth: 16 November 1955 (age 70)
- Place of birth: Santa Fe, Argentina
- Height: 1.78 m (5 ft 10 in)
- Position: Centre back

Senior career*
| Years | Team | Apps | (Gls) |
| 1976–1977 | Ferro Carril Oeste | 5 | (0) |
| 1977–1978 | Independiente Rivadavia | 6 | (2) |
| 1978–1988 | Ferro Carril Oeste | 424 | (24) |
| 1988–1992 | Huracán | 132 | (8) |
| Total | | 567 | (34) |

International career
| 1984 | Argentina | 3 | (0) |

Managerial career
- 1993–1995: Huracán
- 1995–1997: Lanús
- 1997–1999: Mallorca
- 1999–2001: Valencia
- 2001–2003: Inter Milan
- 2004–2006: Mallorca
- 2007: Real Betis
- 2008: Parma
- 2008–2009: Georgia
- 2009–2011: Aris
- 2011: Racing Santander
- 2011–2013: Orduspor
- 2013–2014: Al Wasl
- 2015–2018: Egypt
- 2018–2019: Uzbekistan
- 2021–2022: DR Congo
- 2023–2024: Syria
- 2026: Universitario
Medal record
Men's football
Representing Egypt (as manager)
Africa Cup of Nations
| Runner-up | 2017 |
- * Club domestic league appearances and goals

Héctor Raúl Cúper (Spanish pronunciation: [ˈeɣtoɾ ˈkupeɾ]; born 16 November 1955) is an Argentine football manager and former player. He was recently the manager of Peruvian club Universitario.

As a player, he was a defender who spent most of his career at Ferro Carril Oeste, where he played 463 games. His nickname was "Cabezón" ("Big head").

He made his managerial breakthrough at Mallorca, reaching the Copa del Rey final in 1998 and the final of the UEFA Cup Winners' Cup a year later, as well as a best-ever third-place finish. In two years at Valencia, he reached the UEFA Champions League final twice, earning a move to Italy's Inter Milan in 2001.

Cúper also managed Betis and Racing Santander in La Liga, and Parma in Serie A. He later coached the national teams of Georgia, Egypt, Uzbekistan and DR Congo, taking the second of those countries to the 2017 Africa Cup of Nations final and a place at the 2018 FIFA World Cup.

== Personal life ==
Cúper's great-grandfather was an Englishman whose surname was Cooper, who migrated to Santa Fe Province in Argentina and married an indigenous woman. However, the majority of his heritage is Italian.

He was born in Chábas, a small settlement in Santa Fe. His mother died at the age of 20, months after the birth of his younger brother, and he was raised by his grandmother.

== Playing career ==
As with most aspiring footballers in Chábas in the 1960s, Cúper moved to Buenos Aires to pursue his career. He took leave from his job at a bank to search for a team in the capital city, eventually being signed by Ferro Carril Oeste. While at the club, he won the Argentine Primera División in 1982 and 1984.

== Managerial career ==
=== Early career ===
Cúper started his coaching career with Huracán, a year and a half after his retirement. He led the club to the 2nd place in the Clausura 1994 tournament, eventually losing the last match against the rivals for the title Independiente. In 1995 he moved to Lanús, where he won his first trophy as manager, the Copa CONMEBOL.

In the summer of 1997, he was hired by Mallorca, and in the very first season he drove the modest club to the final of the Copa del Rey, which he would lose against Barcelona, but won the 1998 Supercopa de España against the same opponent. The following season the team reached the final of the UEFA Cup Winners' Cup, where they lost to Lazio at Villa Park. That season Mallorca also recorded their best-ever La Liga finish of 3rd, allowing the team to play in the UEFA Champions League.

=== Valencia ===
In March 1999, Valencia manager Claudio Ranieri stated that he wanted Cúper to be his successor when he left at the end of the season; Cúper turned down a new contract at Mallorca and left in June. At Valencia, he won another Supercopa de España but lost the final of the Champions League two consecutive times; in 2000 against Real Madrid, and in 2001 against Bayern Munich on penalty shoot-out.

=== Inter Milan ===
On 22 June 2001, Cúper was hired by Italian club Inter Milan, replacing Marco Tardelli. In his first season, the club started the final day on 5 May 2002 in pole position for a first Scudetto since 1989, but lost to Lazio and handed the title to rivals Juventus, retreating to the 3rd place.

In the 2002–03 season, Cúper's team ended up at 2nd place in Serie A and lost in the semi-finals of UEFA Champions League to city rivals AC Milan on the away goals rule, despite both teams playing their home games at the San Siro. He was fired from the club on 19 October 2003, after six matches of the 2003–04 season, when the team was in 8th place.

=== Mallorca return, Betis, Parma ===
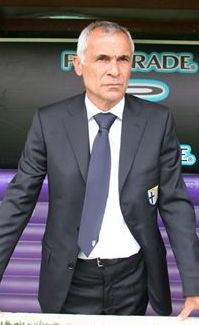
Cúper with Parma in May 2008

On 2 November 2004 Cúper returned to Mallorca after the sacking of Benito Floro, with the team 19th after 10 matches. He saved the team from relegation on the last day, and made several signings, but resigned on 14 February 2006 with the team last following a nine-game winless run.

On 16 July 2007, Cúper was revealed as the new manager of Real Betis on a one-year deal. He was sacked on 2 December with the team 19th after losing at home to Atlético Madrid.

On 11 March 2008, he was unveiled as the new boss of relegation-battling Serie A team Parma, replacing Domenico Di Carlo at the helm of the Gialloblù. He was then sacked two months later before the final game of the season after winning only two in 10 matches as manager, this eventually leading to Parma's relegation to Serie B.

=== 2008–2013 ===
In August 2008, Cúper became the head coach of the Georgia national team. He agreed to step down in November 2009 before the expiration of his contract, having taken just three points and no wins in 2010 FIFA World Cup qualification.

On 3 November 2009, Cúper agreed to continue his managerial career with Greek club Aris until the end of the 2009–10 season. On 15 December, he extended his contract with Aris until June 2011. On 24 April Cúper lost another final, this time in the Greek Football Cup against Panathinaikos.

In the 2010–11 season, Cúper lead Aris in its first participation in the Round of 32 of the 2010–11 UEFA Europa League, taking the club to second place in Group B with 10 points, after two surprise wins against Atlético Madrid. On 18 January 2011 after some bad results in Greece, Cúper decided to step down from his managerial position.

On 29 June 2011, Cúper returned to La Liga with Racing Santander, signing for one season. However, after five months he left the last-placed team by mutual agreement with the board.

Cúper signed a contract with Süper Lig side Orduspor on 19 December 2011, but left by mutual consent on 13 April 2013.

On 14 November 2013, Cúper was announced as new head coach of the UAE League side Al Wasl. He was sacked on 4 March 2014 due to poor results.

=== Return to international football ===
==== Egypt ====
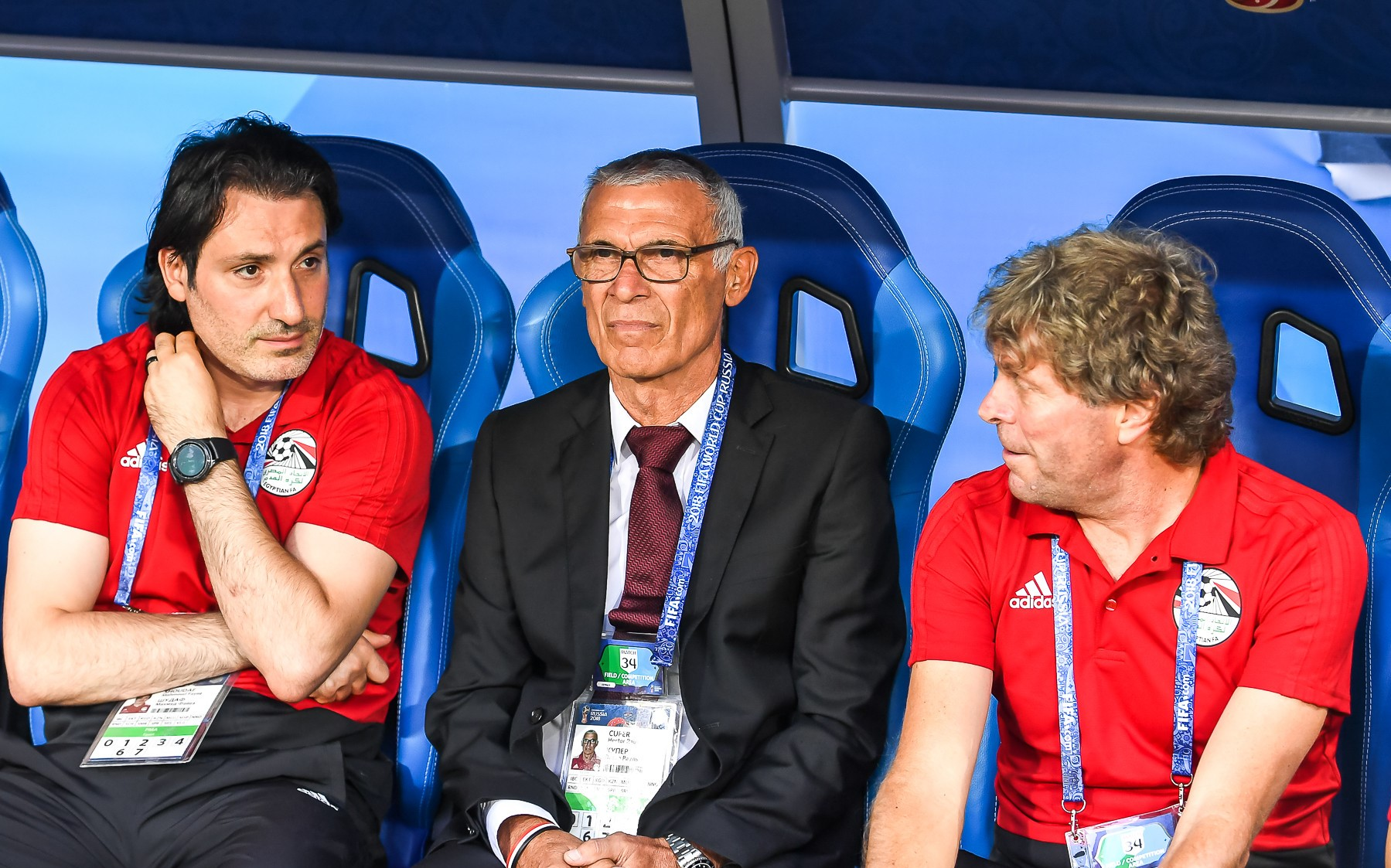
Cúper (centre) managing Egypt at the 2018 World Cup

On 2 March 2015, the Egyptian Football Association appointed Cúper as the new manager of their national football team. At the 2017 Africa Cup of Nations, he led the team to the final, which they lost 2–1 to Cameroon.

He led Egypt to the 2018 FIFA World Cup, their first appearance in the tournament since 1990, after defeating Congo by 2–1. His contract was due to expire at the end of the tournament, and negotiations were postponed until its conclusion. Following defeats in Egypt's three group games at the tournament, it was announced that Cúper's contract would not be renewed.

==== Uzbekistan ====
On 1 August 2018, Cúper became head coach of the Uzbekistan national team, signing a contract that would take him through to the 2022 FIFA World Cup. He was sacked in September 2019 after a shock 2–0 loss away to Palestine in the first qualifying game for that tournament.

==== DR Congo ====
On 13 May 2021, Cúper was appointed manager of the DR Congo. He lost 1–0 away to Tunisia in a friendly on his debut on 5 June. In March 2022, his team missed out on the 2022 FIFA World Cup after a 5–2 aggregate playoff loss to Morocco. He was dismissed on 9 June 2022, having lost to Gabon and Sudan in the first 2023 Africa Cup of Nations qualifiers.

==== Syria ====
On 2 February 2023, Cúper became the head coach of the Syria national team on a contract of undisclosed length. He managed to recruit three of his countrymen with Syrian descent, Ezequiel Ham, Ibrahim Hesar and Jalil Elías, ahead of the 2023 AFC Asian Cup held in Qatar. Under Cúper, Syria qualified to the knockout phase of the Asian tournament as one of the best third-placed teams following a 1–0 victory over India, the first time ever Syria managed to do so after six previous participations ended in the group stages.

In February 2024, he extended his contract with the national team, committing to stay on board for the duration of the 2026 FIFA World Cup qualification. However, following two away defeats, 1–0 to North Korea, and 5–0 to Japan, during the 2026 World Cup qualification, resulting in Syria's failure to qualify for the World Cup, Cúper resigned from his position as head coach of Syria.

=== Universitario ===
On 11 May 2026, Cúper was appointed manager of Peruvian club Universitario de Deportes.

== Managerial statistics ==
As of 19 September 2026

| Team | From | To | Record | | | | | |
| Team | From | To | G | W | D | L | Win % | Ref |
|---|---|---|---|---|---|---|---|---|
| Huracán | 1 July 1993 | 30 June 1995 | 65 | 22 | 19 | 24 | 33.85 | |
| Lanús | 1 July 1995 | 30 June 1997 | 84 | 42 | 22 | 20 | 50.00 | |
| Mallorca | 10 July 1997 | 31 May 1999 | 102 | 49 | 26 | 27 | 48.04 | |
| Valencia | 1 July 1999 | 30 June 2001 | 120 | 59 | 32 | 29 | 49.17 | |
| Inter Milan | 22 June 2001 | 17 October 2003 | 108 | 56 | 31 | 21 | 51.85 | |
| Mallorca | 2 November 2004 | 13 February 2006 | 53 | 13 | 13 | 27 | 24.53 | |
| Real Betis | 14 July 2007 | 2 December 2007 | 15 | 2 | 6 | 7 | 13.33 | |
| Parma | 11 March 2008 | 12 May 2008 | 10 | 2 | 3 | 5 | 20.00 | |
| Georgia | 8 August 2008 | 15 October 2009 | 16 | 1 | 4 | 11 | 6.25 | |
| Aris | 8 November 2009 | 18 January 2011 | 61 | 26 | 14 | 21 | 42.62 | |
| Racing Santander | 1 July 2011 | 29 November 2011 | 13 | 1 | 6 | 6 | 7.69 | |
| Orduspor | 20 December 2011 | 13 April 2013 | 50 | 14 | 19 | 17 | 28.00 | |
| Al Wasl | 12 November 2013 | 4 March 2014 | 20 | 5 | 3 | 12 | 25.00 | |
| Egypt | 2 March 2015 | 26 June 2018 | 38 | 19 | 7 | 12 | 50.00 | |
| Uzbekistan | 1 August 2018 | 23 September 2019 | 16 | 7 | 3 | 6 | 43.75 | |
| DR Congo | 13 May 2021 | 9 June 2022 | 14 | 3 | 4 | 7 | 21.43 | |
| Syria | 2 February 2023 | 11 June 2024 | 18 | 5 | 6 | 7 | 27.78 | |
| Universitario | 11 May 2026 | 29 September 2026 | 16 | 7 | 6 | 3 | 43.75 | |
| Total | | | 819 | 333 | 224 | 262 | 40.66 | — |

== Honours ==
=== Player ===
Ferro Carril Oeste

- Primera División: 1982 Nacional, 1984 Nacional

Huracán

- Primera B Nacional: 1989–90

=== Manager ===
Huracán

- Primera División runner-up: 1994 Clausura

Lanús

- Copa CONMEBOL: 1996

Mallorca

- Supercopa de España: 1998
- Copa del Rey runner-up: 1997–98
- UEFA Cup Winners' Cup runner-up: 1998–99

Valencia

- Supercopa de España: 1999
- UEFA Champions League runner-up: 1999–2000, 2000–01

Aris FC Thessaloniki

- Greek Cup runner-up: 2009–10

Egypt

- Africa Cup of Nations runner-up: 2017

Individual

- La Liga Coach of the Year – Don Balón Award: 1999
- UEFA Club Coach of the Year: 2000
- Globe Soccer Awards best Best Arab National Team Coach: 2017
- CAF Coach of the Year: 2017
