= Paquito Ortiz =

Spanish association football player

Personal information
- Full name: Francisco Ortiz Rivas
- Date of birth: 12 August 1969 (age 57)
- Place of birth: Granada, Spain
- Height: 1.78 m (5 ft 10 in)
- Position: Midfielder

Youth career
- Maspalomas

Senior career*
Years	Team	Apps	(Gls)
1988–1992	Maspalomas	84	(5)
1992–2001	Las Palmas	239	(15)
2001–2005	Raith Rovers	90	(7)
2005	Hamilton Academical	12	(0)
Total		425	(27)

Managerial career
- 2002–2004: Raith Rovers (assistant)
- 2017: Las Palmas (interim)
- * Club domestic league appearances and goals

Francisco "Paquito" Ortiz Rivas (born 12 August 1969) is a Spanish retired footballer who played mainly as a central midfielder, and is a current coach.

== Club career ==
Born in Granada, Andalusia, Paquito made his senior debut with CD Maspalomas on 8 May 1988, coming on as a substitute in a 7–0 Segunda División B home routing of UD Las Palmas Atlético. He continued to appear regularly for the side until 1992, when he joined UD Las Palmas also in the third division.

Paquito became an immediate starter at the side, helping in their promotion to Segunda División in 1996. He made his professional debut on 31 August of that year by starting in a 0–0 draw against Almería CF, and scored his first goal in the category on 15 December by netting the equalizer in a 1–1 home draw against Deportivo Alavés.

Already team captain, Paquito continued to feature regularly until the 1999–2000 season, where he acted as a backup in the club's promotion to La Liga. He made his debut in the top tier on 26 November 2000, playing the last nine minutes after replacing Josico in a 1–0 away win against CD Numancia.

On 31 October 2001, Paquito moved abroad and signed for Scottish First Division side Raith Rovers, agreeing to a contract until the end of the season. He also acted as Antonio Calderón's assistant during his spell, but left in January 2005 for fellow league team Hamilton Academical.

After his retirement, Paquito worked as a fitness coach for Albacete Balompié and the Saudi Arabia national team. On 12 June 2017 he returned to Las Palmas as a match delegate, but on 30 November, was appointed interim manager following the departure of Pako Ayestarán; after the appointment of Paco Jémez on 21 December, he returned to his previous role.

== Managerial statistics ==
As of 20 December 2017

Managerial record by team and tenure
Team	Nat	From	To	Record								Ref
Team	Nat	From	To	G	W	D	L	GF	GA	GD	Win %	Ref
Las Palmas (interim)	(Spain)	30 November 2017	21 December 2017	4	1	1	2	3	6	−3	25.00	
Total				4	1	1	2	3	6	−3	25.00	—
