= Luis Rueda =

Argentine footballer and coach

Personal information
- Full name: Luis Enrique Rueda
- Date of birth: 11 January 1972 (age 54)
- Place of birth: San Rafael, Argentina
- Height: 1.78 m (5 ft 10 in)
- Position: Striker

Senior career*
Years	Team	Apps	(Gls)
1996–1997	Gimnasia y Tiro	41	(22)
1997–1998	Extremadura	58	(14)
1999	Belgrano	17	(5)
2000	Talleres	16	(11)
2000–2003	Racing Club	38	(6)
2001–2002	→ Universidad de Chile (loan)	28	(17)
2003–2004	Gimnasia LP	29	(5)
2004	Olimpo	11	(0)
2005	Quilmes	2	(0)
2006	Deportes La Serena	14	(7)
2007	San Martín Tucumán	16	(4)
2007–2010	Gimnasia y Tiro	48	(16)
Total		318	(107)

Managerial career
- 2014–2015: Gimnasia y Tiro
- * Club domestic league appearances and goals

Luis Enrique Rueda (born 11 January 1972 in San Rafael, Mendoza) is an Argentine former footballer and head coach who played as a striker.

== Club career ==
Nicknamed "El Cóndor", Rueda began his professional career at Gimnasia y Tiro in 1996. His impressive displays awoke the interest of Spanish club Extremadura, which later signed him for the 1997–1998 season. In his return to Argentina, he played for Córdoba's fierce rivals Belgrano and subsequently Talleres. His good form rewarded him with a transfer to Argentine giant Racing Club. After a year with the academia he was loaned to club Universidad de Chile just to be back in Avalleneda the following year to face Copa Libertadores 2003 with Racing. In that tournament Rueda excelled with 5 goals scored in 8 games. Gimnasia de La Plata then acquired his rights hoping to benefit from his goals, but Rueda was unable to match the performance of previous seasons. He then played for Olimpo de Bahía Blanca (2004) and later with Quilmes (2005), where he saw some action in Copa Libertadores of that year. In 2006, he moved back to Chile to join La Serena. The following season, he received some offers from Argentina, and ended up signing with second division club San Martín de Tucumán before landing a job with Gimnasia y Tiro, the club that launched his football career initially.
