= Iván Campo =

Spanish footballer (born 1974)

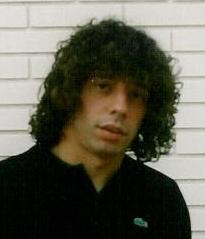
- Campo in 1996

Personal information
- Full name: Iván Campo Ramos
- Date of birth: 21 February 1974 (age 52)
- Place of birth: San Sebastián, Spain
- Height: 1.85 m (6 ft 1 in)
- Positions: Centre-back; defensive midfielder

Youth career
- Logroñés
- Alavés

Senior career*
Years	Team	Apps	(Gls)
1993–1995	Alavés	45	(2)
1995–1997	Valencia	25	(1)
1995–1996	→ Valladolid (loan)	24	(2)
1997–1998	Mallorca	33	(1)
1998–2003	Real Madrid	60	(1)
2002–2003	→ Bolton Wanderers (loan)	31	(2)
2003–2008	Bolton Wanderers	141	(11)
2008–2009	Ipswich Town	17	(1)
2009–2010	AEK Larnaca	8	(0)
Total		384	(21)

International career
1998–2000	Spain	4	(0)
2000–2006	Basque Country	2	(0)
- * Club domestic league appearances and goals

Iván Campo Ramos (born 21 February 1974) is a Spanish former professional footballer. Originally a centre-back, he featured in a defensive midfield role in the later years of his career.

He played for Real Madrid and four other teams in his country, and is also remembered for his spell in England with Bolton Wanderers.

Campo represented Spain in the 1998 World Cup.

== Club career ==
=== Spain ===
Born in San Sebastián, Basque Country, Campo started his career at Deportivo Alavés of Segunda División B. He stayed there for two and a half years, signing with Valencia CF who immediately loaned him for the rest of the season to Real Valladolid, which he helped narrowly avoid relegation from La Liga.

Subsequently, Campo returned to Valencia only to be released, joining recently promoted team RCD Mallorca. In the Balearic Islands, he formed a formidable partnership with Marcelino Elena (later of Newcastle United), as they finished fifth in 1997–98.

Campo signed with Real Madrid in the summer of 1998, and contributed to the 1999–2000 conquest of the UEFA Champions League, playing the full 90 minutes in the final against former club Valencia. He often underachieved during his spell at the Santiago Bernabéu Stadium due to pressure from the supporters and the press, which led to several situations of anxiety disorder.

=== Bolton Wanderers ===
After falling out of favour at Real, Campo was sent to Bolton Wanderers on a one-year loan in August 2002. Following the 2002–03 campaign he was expected to return to the Spanish capital, but unexpectedly signed a three-year permanent deal with the English club, deciding he preferred living in Bolton.

On 19 August 2006, in the first match of the new season, Campo scored a long-range drive which caught Tottenham Hotspur and England's Paul Robinson off-guard and flew into the bottom corner of the net. In a post-match interview, his boss Sam Allardyce admitted Bolton's goal of the season competition may have already been decided by the "wonder strike".

Campo fitted in well with his side's style of play, but also topped the charts for most red and yellow cards received of any player in the Premier League in 2006–07. In May 2008, he was not offered a new contract by manager Gary Megson and left the team.

Shortly before the UEFA Euro 2008 tournament, Campo wrote a letter to the Bolton faithful expressing his regret at not having been able to bid the club a proper farewell, and the letter appeared on a website run by Sky Sports presenter Guillem Balagué. He eventually played in a testimonial match at the Reebok Stadium, in honour of teammate Jussi Jääskeläinen.

=== Later years ===
On 11 August 2008, Campo signed for Ipswich Town of the Football League Championship after passing a medical. He scored his first goal against Barnsley in a 3–0 win, but after only featuring in roughly a third of the league's matches, the 35-year-old was released by manager Roy Keane at the end of the season.

Campo joined Cypriot Second Division side AEK Larnaca FC in December 2009. He retired in June of the following year, having appeared in 124 Spanish top-division games in seven years and 194 competitive matches for Bolton.

== International career ==
Campo played four times with Spain, his debut coming on 25 March 1998 in a 4–0 friendly victory over Sweden, in Vigo. He was picked for the squad for the 1998 FIFA World Cup in France, with the national team exiting in the group stage.

== Other ventures ==
Campo featured in a Spanish TV advert for a fruit drink. In the advert, two men take off their shirts to reveal tattoos of Campo's head on their chests.

An Indie band from Preston, England have named themselves Ivan Campo. They featured as part of an interview given by Charlie Webster for a BBC News report after the player signed for Ipswich.

== Honours ==
Mallorca

- Copa del Rey runner-up: 1997–98

Real Madrid

- La Liga: 2000–01
- UEFA Champions League: 1999–2000, 2001–02
- Intercontinental Cup: 1998

Bolton Wanderers

- Football League Cup runner-up: 2003–04
