= Carlos Roa =

Argentine footballer

Personal information
- Full name: Carlos Ángel Roa
- Date of birth: 15 August 1969 (age 57)
- Place of birth: Santa Fe, Argentina
- Height: 1.91 m (6 ft 3 in)
- Position: Goalkeeper

Team information
- Current team: C.F Monterrey (goalkeeper coach)

Senior career*
Years	Team	Apps	(Gls)
1988–1993	Racing Club	104	(0)
1994–1997	Lanús	107	(1)
1997–2002	Mallorca	75	(0)
2002–2004	Albacete	53	(0)
2005–2006	Olimpo	27	(0)
Total		366	(1)

International career
1992	Argentina U23		
1997–1999	Argentina	16	(0)
- * Club domestic league appearances and goals

Carlos Ángel Roa (born 15 August 1969) is an Argentine former professional footballer who played as a goalkeeper. He is currently the goalkeeper coach of Greek Super League club AEK Athens.

Most of his professional career was spent with Racing Club and in Spain with Mallorca, winning one major trophy with the latter. Roa was first-choice for the Argentina national team at the 1998 World Cup.

== Club career ==
Born in Santa Fe, Roa started playing professionally for Racing Club, making his Primera División debut on 6 November 1988 at the age of 19. During a summer tour of Africa with the club, he contracted malaria, but fully recovered. In 1994, he moved to Lanús, rarely missing a match with the Buenos Aires Province side as they achieved three consecutive third-place league finishes (one in 1995, two in 1996), and adding the Copa CONMEBOL in 1996.

Roa then signed with Spanish club Mallorca alongside Lanús teammate Óscar Mena, playing 25 La Liga matches as the Balearic Islands club finished fifth straight out of Segunda División and also reached the final in the 1997-98 Copa del Rey, they lost against Barcelona on a penalty shoot-out.

In the summer of 1999, after helping Mallorca win the domestic Supercup and reach the final of the UEFA Cup Winners' Cup (already accompanied in the team by former Lanús teammates Ariel Ibagaza and Gustavo Siviero), 30-year-old Roa retired from football in order to take a religious retreat. After a year of charitable and religious work spent as a member of his church, his convictions led to his refusal to discuss a new contract with his team because he believed the world was going to end in the near future.

Less than one year later, Roa returned to Mallorca, forced to play out the remaining two years of his contract. Never being able to reproduce his previous form, he was relegated to the bench by compatriot Leo Franco.

Subsequently, Roa moved to Albacete, appearing in 39 league games as the Castile-La Mancha side returned to the top division after a seven-year absence. Midway through the following season, he was diagnosed with testicular cancer and was forced to stop playing; after surgery, he spent an entire year between chemotherapy and rehabilitation.

After keeping his fitness with amateurs Constancia and Atlético Baleares, both in the Mallorca area, Roa returned to professional football and his country, joining Olimpo and retiring after one top division season. In 2008, he joined amateurs Atlético Brown as a goalkeeper coach. He was appointed assistant manager two years later at Ben Hur; in the former capacity, he went to work under former international teammate Matías Almeyda at River Plate, Banfield and Guadalajara.

== International career ==
In 1992, Roa appeared for Argentina at the 1992 CONMEBOL Pre-Olympic Tournament in Paraguay, which saw the country fail to qualify for the 1992 Summer Olympics. He was selected by the full side for the 1998 FIFA World Cup in France: after not conceding any goals during the group stage, he saved the decisive penalty in the shootout against England in the round-of-16, denying Newcastle United's David Batty. The national team was eventually defeated in the following match by the Netherlands (1–2).

== Career statistics ==
=== Club ===
Appearances and goals by club, season and competition
Club	Season	League			Cup		Continental		Other		Total	
Club	Season	Division	Apps	Goals	Apps	Goals	Apps	Goals	Apps	Goals	Apps	Goals
Racing Club	1988–89	Argentine Primera División	1	0	—		1 (Note: Appearance in Copa Libertadores)	0	—		2	0
Racing Club	1989–90	Argentine Primera División	22	0	—		—		—		22	0
Racing Club	1990–91	Argentine Primera División	3	0	—		—		—		3	0
Racing Club	1991–92	Argentine Primera División	31	0	—		6 (Note: Appearances in Supercopa Libertadores)	0	1 (Note: Appearance in Copa Master de Supercopa)	0	38	0
Racing Club	1992–93	Argentine Primera División	31	0	—		—		—		31	0
Racing Club	1993–94	Argentine Primera División	16	0	—		—		—		16	0
Racing Club	Total		104	0	—		7	0	1	0	112	0
Lanús	1994–95	Argentine Primera División	36	0	—		—		—		36	0
Lanús	1995–96	Argentine Primera División	36	0	—		—		—		36	0
Lanús	1996–97	Argentine Primera División	35	1	—		2 (Note: Appearances in Copa CONMEBOL)	0	—		37	1
Lanús	Total		107	1	—		2	0	—		109	1
Mallorca	1997–98	La Liga	25	0	6	0	—		—		31	0
Mallorca	1998–99	La Liga	35	0	4	0	8 (Note: Appearances in UEFA Cup Winners' Cup)	0	2 (Note: Appearance(s) in Supercopa de España)	0	49	0
Mallorca	2000–01	La Liga	4	0	0	0	—		—		4	0
Mallorca	2001–02	La Liga	11	0	0	0	2 (Note: Appearances in UEFA Champions League)	0	—		13	0
Mallorca	Total		75	0	10	0	10	0	2	0	97	0
Albacete	2002–03	Segunda División	39	0	0	0	—		—		39	0
Albacete	2003–04	La Liga	14	0	0	0	—		—		14	0
Albacete	Total		53	0	0	0	—		—		53	0
Olimpo	2005–06	Argentine Primera División	27	0	—		—		—		27	0
Career total			366	1	10	0	19	0	3	0	398	1

=== International ===
Appearances by national team and year

National team	Year	Apps	Goals
Argentina	1997	9	0
Argentina	1998	6	0
Argentina	1999	1	0
Total		16	0

== Honours ==
Racing

- Supercopa Sudamericana: 1988
- Recopa Sudamericana runner-up: 1989

Lanús

- Copa CONMEBOL: 1996

Mallorca

- Supercopa de España: 1998
- UEFA Cup Winners' Cup runner-up: 1998–99
- Copa del Rey runner-up: 1997–98

Individual

- Ricardo Zamora Trophy: 1997–98
- ESM Team of the Year: 1998–99

== Personal life ==
Roa is a Seventh-day Adventist, teetotaller and vegetarian. He is married and has two daughters.
