= Santiago Ezquerro =

Spanish footballer

Santi Ezquerro
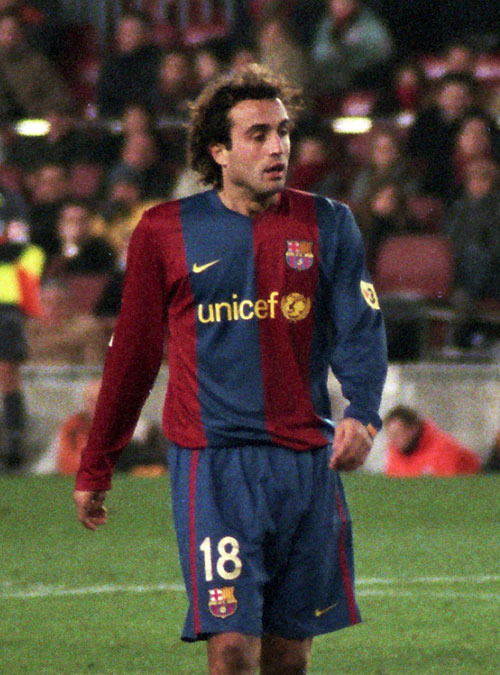
- Ezquerro playing for Barcelona in 2006

Personal information
- Full name: Santiago Ezquerro Marín
- Date of birth: 14 December 1976 (age 49)
- Place of birth: Calahorra, Spain
- Height: 1.81 m (5 ft 11 in)
- Position: Forward

Youth career
- 1992–1993: Calahorra
- 1993–1994: Osasuna

Senior career*
Years	Team	Apps	(Gls)
1994–1995	Osasuna B	15	(1)
1995–1996	Osasuna	38	(8)
1996–1997	Atlético Madrid B	34	(11)
1996–1998	Atlético Madrid	8	(0)
1998	→ Mallorca (loan)	14	(6)
1998–2005	Athletic Bilbao	222	(45)
2005–2008	Barcelona	24	(3)
2008–2009	Osasuna	10	(1)
Total		365	(75)

International career
1996	Spain U21	1	(0)
1998	Spain	1	(0)
- * Club domestic league appearances and goals

Santiago 'Santi' Ezquerro Marín (born 14 December 1976) is a Spanish former professional footballer who played as a forward.

Having made a name for himself at Athletic Bilbao, appearing in 260 official games for the club in seven years, he subsequently signed with Barcelona, but struggled significantly during his tenure.

Over 13 seasons in La Liga, Ezquerro amassed totals of 278 matches and 55 goals. In 1998, he made his only appearance for the Spain national team.

== Club career ==
=== Osasuna and Atlético Madrid ===
Born in Calahorra, La Rioja, Ezquerro reached CA Osasuna's youth system aged 16, playing two Segunda División seasons with the Navarrese before signing with Atlético Madrid for the 1996–97 campaign.

He made his La Liga debut on 21 September 1996 in a 3–0 away win against CD Logroñés, but was mainly registered with the club's B side during his spell.

=== Athletic Bilbao ===
Lack of playing opportunities with the Colchoneros prompted a January 1998 move to RCD Mallorca, which Ezquerro helped to reach the final of the Copa del Rey in his six-month stint. He joined Athletic Bilbao subsequently (meeting the club's self-imposed recruitment criteria due to his period of development at Osasuna), with whom he appeared in his first UEFA Champions League games while establishing himself as one of the most promising forwards in Spain's top flight.

His stellar form in 2004–05 – 19 goals in 47 official matches, including a hat-trick in a 7–1 away rout of Standard Liège in the group stage of the UEFA Cup and one in the 3–0 home victory over Real Sociedad in the Basque derby on 9 April 2005– led to FC Barcelona securing his services on a three-year contract that included the possibility of an extension, on a free transfer.

=== Barcelona ===
Ezquerro was never able to establish himself in Barcelona's first team, his progress at the club being further hindered after the emergence of youth graduate Lionel Messi. His best league output consisted of 12 games in his first year (two goals, three starts, in 469 minutes).

In 2007–08, Ezquerro was not given the free transfer by the Catalans and, not being signed by any team in the summer or the January transfer window, was virtually absent for the duration of the campaign, although he did score twice in January against lowly CD Alcoyano in the domestic cup's round of 32, a 2–2 second-leg home draw and 5–2 on aggregate.

=== Osasuna return ===
In July 2008, Ezquerro was released by Barça and, later that month, rejoined Osasuna on an initial two-year deal. During the first season after his return, he struggled with injuries and also failed to fit newly appointed coach José Antonio Camacho's plans, failing to make a squad in any of the team's final matches.

Ezquerro left after just one year – where he earned €1.2 million – and retired at the age of 33.

== International career ==
During his debut season for Athletic, Ezquerro won his sole cap for Spain, in a UEFA Euro 2000 qualifier against Cyprus on 5 September 1998, which ended with a 3–2 away loss and the dismissal of manager Javier Clemente.

== Honours ==
Mallorca

- Copa del Rey runner-up: 1997–98

Barcelona

- La Liga: 2005–06
- UEFA Champions League: 2005–06
- FIFA Club World Cup runner-up: 2006
