= Roger García =

Spanish footballer

Roger
Personal information
- Full name: Roger García Junyent
- Date of birth: 15 December 1976 (age 49)
- Place of birth: Sabadell, Spain
- Height: 1.80 m (5 ft 11 in)
- Position: Midfielder

Youth career
- 1982–1987: Mercantil
- 1987–1994: Barcelona

Senior career*
Years	Team	Apps	(Gls)
1994–1995	Barcelona B	26	(6)
1995–1999	Barcelona	78	(7)
1999–2003	Espanyol	114	(17)
2003–2006	Villarreal	55	(4)
2006–2007	Ajax	11	(1)
Total		284	(35)

International career
1992–1993	Spain U16	16	(5)
1993–1995	Spain U18	6	(3)
1995	Spain U20	5	(2)
1996–1998	Spain U21	12	(4)

Managerial career
- 2010–2013: Sabadell (assistant)
- 2013–: Catalonia (assistant)
- 2016–2018: Damm
- 2019–2020: Celta (assistant)
- * Club domestic league appearances and goals

Roger García Junyent (born 15 December 1976), known simply as Roger, is a Spanish former footballer who played mostly as a left midfielder. He possessed a strong shot, and was known for his passing ability.

He spent most of his career at Barcelona, without much success, going on to represent three other teams until his retirement, including one abroad. When fit, he played an important part in Villarreal's La Liga consolidation.

Roger's career was significantly hampered by injuries, and he retired from football at the age of 30, amassing Spanish top-division totals of 247 matches and 28 goals.

== Club career ==
Born in Sabadell, Barcelona, Catalonia, Roger was a product of local Barcelona's youth ranks. He made his debut for the first team in the 1994–95 season, going on to appear in 33 games the following campaign while scoring his first goal in a 1–1 away draw against Real Madrid, on 30 September 1995.

After two seasons where he appeared sparingly in back-to-back La Liga conquests, Roger moved to neighbouring Espanyol also in the top division, where he was a starter for much of his stay. In his last year, he netted a career-best nine goals (third-best in the squad) while the side barely avoided relegation.

Roger then spent three seasons with Villarreal, playing only one match in his second due to a serious injury. Over a 12-month period (2002–03, one with each club), he scored three goals while still in his own half of the field.

In 2006, Roger signed with Eredivisie's Ajax, joining former Barça teammate Gabri, but retired after just one season due to persistent injuries. At the Amsterdam Arena, he became the last player to wear number 14 as it was subsequently retired in honour of club legend Johan Cruyff, his coach at Barcelona.

Roger had his first coaching experience in 2010–11, assisting former Barcelona teammate Lluís Carreras at Sabadell and attaining promotion to the second division. In November 2019, following a two-year spell with youth club Damm (he was also its sporting director), he was named assistant at Celta de Vigo, where his older brother Óscar was the manager.

== Personal life ==
Roger's brothers, Óscar and Genís, were also footballers. All youth products of Barcelona, they had however different fates as professionals (especially the latter).

On 17 June 1997, during the final of the Copa Catalunya, all three appeared with the first team in a 3–1 loss to Europa.

== Honours ==
Barcelona

- La Liga: 1997–98, 1998–99
- Copa del Rey: 1996–97, 1997–98
- UEFA Cup Winners' Cup: 1996–97
- UEFA Super Cup: 1997

Espanyol

- Copa del Rey: 1999–2000

Villarreal

- UEFA Intertoto Cup: 2004

Spain U21

- UEFA European Under-21 Championship: 1998
