= Oscar Mena =

Argentine footballer and manager

Personal information
- Full name: Oscar Alcides Mena Fernández
- Date of birth: 30 November 1970 (age 55)
- Place of birth: Luján, Argentina
- Height: 1.78 m (5 ft 10 in)
- Position: Midfielder

Senior career*
Years	Team	Apps	(Gls)
1991–1992	Club Luján		
1992–1994	Defensores		
1994–1996	Platense	42	(7)
1996–1997	Lanús	32	(4)
1997–1998	Mallorca	35	(7)
1998–2001	Atlético Madrid	54	(3)
2001–2002	Racing Santander	19	(1)
2003	Toledo	12	(2)
2003–2004	Olimpo	29	(4)
2004	Las Palmas	6	(0)
2004–2005	Ciempozuelos		

Managerial career
- 2005–2006: Atlético Madrid C (assistant)
- 2009–2010: Antequera
- 2010: Jumilla
- 2011–2012: Atlético Madrid (youth)
- 2012–2014: Atlético Madrid C
- 2014: Atlético Madrid B
- 2016: Alcorcón B
- 2016–2017: Gavà
- * Club domestic league appearances and goals

Oscar Alcides Mena Fernández (born 30 November 1970), nicknamed "El Mencho", is an Argentine former professional football player and manager. He played as a defensive midfielder.

== Playing career ==
Born in Luján, Buenos Aires, Mena started his career playing for Club Luján and then Club Defensores de Cambaceres, both in the third division. In 1994, he made his debut in the Primera División with Club Atlético Platense, moving to Club Atlético Lanús for a further season.

In 1997–98, both Mena and goalkeeper Carlos Roa were bought by Spain's RCD Mallorca. Eminently a defensive-minded player, the former scored seven La Liga goals during the campaign, helping the Balearic Islands team finish fifth straight from the second level as well as to a runner-up finish in the Copa del Rey.

Subsequently, Mena signed with Atlético Madrid, where he faced stiff competition for a starting job and also suffered from injuries. He resumed his career in Spain in its second, third and fourth tiers, with a quick return to Argentina with Olimpo de Bahía Blanca in between.

== Coaching career ==
Mena retired from the game in February 2005, making a return to Atlético Madrid later on, appearing for its indoor soccer side. Subsequently, he began his coaching career, first with the Colchoneros' youths then acting as assistant to the C-team.

On 10 February 2014, following a division three loss at CD Sariñena which left Atlético Madrid B in the relegation zone, Mena replaced Alfredo Santaelena, who had also played for the club in the 90s, as head coach.
