= Javier Olaizola =

Spanish footballer and manager (born 1969)

Personal information
- Full name: Javier Olaizola Rodríguez
- Date of birth: 28 November 1969 (age 56)
- Place of birth: San Sebastián, Spain
- Height: 1.78 m (5 ft 10 in)
- Position: Right-back

Youth career
- Michelín
- Tolosa

Senior career*
Years	Team	Apps	(Gls)
1991–1992	Eibar	38	(0)
1992–1994	Real Burgos	48	(0)
1994–1995	Eibar	36	(0)
1995–2004	Mallorca	272	(1)
Total		394	(1)

International career
1998–2003	Basque Country	3	(0)

Managerial career
- 2013–2014: Mallorca (youth)
- 2014: Mallorca (caretaker)
- 2014–2016: Mallorca B
- 2016–2017: Mallorca
- 2018: Levante B
- 2019–2021: Arenas Getxo
- 2021: Tudelano
- 2022–2023: Arenas Getxo
- * Club domestic league appearances and goals

Javier Olaizola Rodríguez (born 28 November 1969) is a Spanish former professional footballer who played as a right-back, currently a manager.

Most of his 13-year career was spent with Mallorca, with whom he appeared in 333 competitive matches and won two major titles.

== Playing career ==
Born in San Sebastián, Gipuzkoa, Olaizola's first professional club was SD Eibar in his native Basque Country, in the Segunda División. Subsequently, he played two seasons with Real Burgos CF, going on to suffer two consecutive relegations and returning for a second spell with his previous team afterwards.

In 1995, Olaizola signed for RCD Mallorca, immediately becoming an undisputed starter as well as their captain and helping the Balearic Islands side to the 1998 edition of the Supercopa de España against La Liga giants FC Barcelona, as well as a second place in the following year's UEFA Cup Winners' Cup. His only goal in the top flight and as a professional came on 17 December 2000, as he scored a last-minute equaliser at RC Celta de Vigo (2–2).

== Coaching career ==
Olaizola totalled only 27 matches in his last two years, due to several injuries and age, and retired aged 34. He then had brief spells as manager, with Mallorca's youth teams and Antiguoko (also a youth club, in the Basque region).

On 6 December 2016, following Fernando Vázquez's dismissal, Olaizola – who was in charge of the reserves – became coach of Mallorca, who now competed in the second tier. He was himself sacked the following 4 April, after his side was seriously threatened with relegation.

Olaizola returned to reserve management on 6 March 2018, taking over Atlético Levante UD of Tercera División. Four months later, having won their group and then promotion on penalties against UD Ibiza in the play-off final, he left.

In June 2019, Olaizola was appointed at Arenas Club de Getxo in the Segunda División B. In summer 2022, after a very short spell with CD Tudelano, he returned to Arenas, now in the Segunda Federación.

== Personal life ==
Olaizola's older brother, Julio (19 years his senior), was also a footballer and a defender. He played ten top-flight seasons with Real Sociedad.

Olaizola's son is also named Javier. He represented Mallorca at the senior level as well.

== Managerial statistics ==
As of 14 May 2023

Managerial record by team and tenure
Team	Nat	From	To	Record								Ref
Team	Nat	From	To	G	W	D	L	GF	GA	GD	Win %	Ref
Mallorca (caretaker)	(Spain)	20 May 2014	11 July 2014	3	1	2	0	3	1	+2	33.33	
Mallorca B	(Spain)	11 July 2014	6 December 2016	95	40	28	27	134	99	+35	42.11	
Mallorca	(Spain)	6 December 2016	4 April 2017	15	2	6	7	14	21	−7	13.33	
Levante B	(Spain)	6 March 2018	5 July 2018	16	9	5	2	25	13	+12	56.25	
Arenas Getxo	(Spain)	13 June 2019	30 June 2021	54	15	22	17	50	62	−12	27.78	
Tudelano	(Spain)	1 July 2021	14 October 2021	7	0	1	6	4	13	−9	0.00	
Arenas Getxo	(Spain)	1 July 2022	May 2023	36	14	9	13	41	47	−6	38.89	
Total				226	81	73	72	271	256	+15	35.84	—

== Honours ==
Mallorca

- Copa del Rey: 2002–03; runner-up: 1997–98
- Supercopa de España: 1998
- UEFA Cup Winners' Cup runner-up: 1998–99
