= Xabier Eskurza =

Spanish footballer

Personal information
- Full name: Xabier Eskurza García
- Date of birth: 17 January 1970 (age 56)
- Place of birth: Trapagaran, Spain
- Height: 1.77 m (5 ft 10 in)
- Position: Midfielder

Youth career
- 1980–1988: Athletic Bilbao

Senior career*
Years	Team	Apps	(Gls)
1988–1991	Bilbao Athletic	53	(6)
1989–1994	Athletic Bilbao	114	(7)
1994–1995	Barcelona	15	(0)
1995–1997	Valencia	52	(2)
1997–1998	Mallorca	24	(0)
1998–2000	Oviedo	51	(0)
Total		309	(15)

International career
1989–1990	Spain U20	3	(1)
1990–1991	Spain U21	6	(0)
1991–1992	Spain U23	7	(0)
1994–1999	Basque Country	5	(0)
- * Club domestic league appearances and goals

Xabier Eskurza García (born 17 January 1970) is a Spanish former professional footballer who played as a right midfielder.

He achieved La Liga figures of 256 games and goals in 11 seasons, with Athletic Bilbao, Barcelona, Valencia, Mallorca and Oviedo.

== Club career ==
Eskurza was born in Valle de Trápaga-Trapagaran, Biscay. Progressing through the youth system of Athletic Bilbao, he made his La Liga debut with the club on 17 September 1989 in a 2–0 win over RC Celta de Vigo, and scored his first goal in the competition two months later to help the hosts to defeat Real Zaragoza by the same result. After strong performances in the 1993–94 season, he failed to reach an agreement for a renewal and signed for Johan Cruyff's FC Barcelona in a swap deal with Jon Andoni Goikoetxea.

However, Eskurza only appeared in 19 competitive games in his one-year spell at the Camp Nou, mainly due to a serious adductor injury. In summer 1995 he joined Valencia CF on a four-year contract but, two years into it, moved to fellow top-division side RCD Mallorca with whom he reached the final of the 1997–98 Copa del Rey, missing the last attempt in the 5–4 penalty shootout loss to Barcelona in Valencia.

Eskurza agreed to a deal at Real Oviedo in August 1998. He retired in 2000 at age 30, due to hip problems.

After his retirement, Eskurza worked as a players' agent.

== International career ==
Eskurza represented Spain at youth level. He also earned caps for the unofficial Basque Country team.

== Honours ==
Barcelona

- Supercopa de España: 1994

Mallorca

- Copa del Rey runner-up: 1997–98
