= Paco Soler =

Spanish footballer and manager

Personal information
- Full name: Francisco Manuel Soler Atencia
- Date of birth: 5 March 1970 (age 56)
- Place of birth: Palma, Spain
- Height: 1.69 m (5 ft 6 1/2 in)
- Position: Midfielder

Youth career
- CIDE

Senior career*
Years	Team	Apps	(Gls)
1988–1991	Mallorca B	69	(9)
1991–2004	Mallorca	339	(19)
Total		408	(28)

International career
1991–1992	Spain U23	11	(1)

Managerial career
- 2007: Beira-Mar
- 2009–2010: Atlético Baleares
- 2013: Atlético Baleares
- * Club domestic league appearances and goals

Olympic medal record

Representing Spain

Men's Football
Gold medal – first place	1992 Barcelona	Team competition

Francisco Manuel "Paco" Soler Atencia (born 5 March 1970) is a Spanish former professional football central midfielder and manager.

He only played with Mallorca during his career, amassing La Liga totals of 168 matches and three goals over nine seasons and spending 14 years with the first team. He subsequently became a coach.

== Club career ==
A hard-nosed player, Soler was born in Palma de Mallorca, Balearic Islands, and spent his entire career with local club RCD Mallorca. He made his first-team debut in the 1990–91 season, and went on to make 419 competitive appearances for them.

In 1996–97, Soler was instrumental in helping Mallorca return to La Liga, and also appeared regularly the following campaign as the team finished fifth. He was named on the substitutes bench for the final of the 1998–99 UEFA Cup Winners' Cup.

In his final two years, however, Soler played almost no part in the side's lineups, and retired after 2003–04 at the age of 34. He took up coaching subsequently and, in January 2007, was appointed at Portuguese Primeira Liga club S.C. Beira-Mar after it signed a cooperation deal with Inverfutbol, a Spanish-based sporting company, not being able to help the Aveiro team avoid relegation.

In February 2009, Soler returned to his native region, replacing former Spanish international Francisco at the helm of lowly CD Atlético Baleares and suffering another relegation. Four years later, he left his post as director of football and again became their manager.

== International career ==
Soler was part of the Spain squad that won the gold medal at the 1992 Summer Olympics in Barcelona, appearing in four matches for a total of 277 minutes.

== Honours ==
Mallorca

- Copa del Rey: 2002–03; runner-up: 1990–91, 1997–98
- Supercopa de España: 1998
- UEFA Cup Winners' Cup runner-up: 1998–99

Spain U23

- Summer Olympic Games: 1992

== See also ==
- List of one-club men
