= Jovan Stanković =

Serbian footballer

Personal information
- Full name: Jovan Stanković
- Date of birth: 4 March 1971 (age 55)
- Place of birth: Pirot, SFR Yugoslavia
- Height: 1.83 m (6 ft 0 in)
- Position: Midfielder

Senior career*
Years	Team	Apps	(Gls)
1989–1991	Radnički Pirot	36	(9)
1991–1992	Radnički Niš	18	(6)
1992–1996	Red Star Belgrade	63	(3)
1992	→ Radnički Niš (loan)	17	(1)
1995	→ Radnički Beograd (loan)	7	(0)
1996–2001	Mallorca	164	(17)
2001	Marseille	6	(0)
2001–2003	Atlético Madrid	52	(1)
2003–2004	Mallorca	11	(0)
2004–2005	Lleida	26	(1)
Total		400	(38)

International career
1998–2000	FR Yugoslavia	10	(0)

Managerial career
- 2007: Beira-Mar (assistant)
- 2009–2010: Atlético Baleares (assistant)
- 2014: Sinđelić Beograd
- 2015–2017: Red Star (youth)
- 2017: Iskra Danilovgrad
- 2020–2021: San Fernando
- * Club domestic league appearances and goals

Jovan Stanković (Serbian Cyrillic: Јован Станковић; born 4 March 1971) is a Serbian former football manager and former player who played as a left midfielder.

He spent the better part of his career with Red Star Belgrade and in Spain, most notably with Mallorca – he played a full decade in the latter country, also representing two other clubs.

Stanković represented FR Yugoslavia at Euro 2000.

== Club career ==
Stanković was born in Pirot, Socialist Federal Republic of Yugoslavia. Amongst other clubs, he played for Red Star Belgrade, Olympique de Marseille in France and RCD Mallorca and Atlético Madrid in Spain.

In 1998–99's Mallorca, Stanković contributed with four La Liga goals in 36 matches and several assists as the Balearic Islands side finished third and qualified to the UEFA Champions League. He scored in the subsequent third qualifying round against Molde FK through a penalty, but the 1–1 home draw eliminated the hosts on the away goals rule.

After being an instrumental unit in helping Atlético promote from Segunda División in the 2001–02 season, Stanković retired at the end of 2004–05 at the age of 34, following a spell with Catalonia's UE Lleida also in that tier. He later worked as an assistant manager to former Mallorca teammate Paco Soler, first in S.C. Beira-Mar (Portugal) then lowly CD Atlético Baleares.

As a head coach, Stanković was in charge of several teams in his country. He moved back to Spain in 2020, after being named manager of Segunda División B side San Fernando CD.

== International career ==
Stanković was a FR Yugoslavia international during two years, and was a participant at the UEFA Euro 2000 for a total of ten caps. His debut came on 23 September 1998, in a 1–1 friendly draw with Brazil.
