= Arturo Daudén Ibáñez =

Spanish football referee

- Born: 9 July 1964 (age 62); Cantavieja, Spain

Domestic
Years	League	Role
1994–2005	La Liga	Referee

International
Years	League	Role
1997–2005	FIFA listed	Referee

Arturo Daudén Ibáñez (born 9 July 1964 in Cantavieja) is a retired Spanish professional football referee. He was a full international for FIFA from 1997 until his retirement in 2005.
