= Ivan Rocha =

Brazilian footballer (born 1969)

Personal information
- Full name: Ivan Rocha Limas
- Date of birth: 14 January 1969 (age 57)
- Place of birth: São Paulo, Brazil
- Height: 1.85 m (6 ft 1 in)
- Position: Defender

Youth career
- 1983–1987: São Paulo

Senior career*
Years	Team	Apps	(Gls)
1987–1992	São Paulo	35	(2)
1992–1994	Valladolid	56	(12)
1994–1996	Atlético Madrid	13	(2)
1996	→ Valladolid (loan)	0	(0)
1997	→ Logroñés (loan)	5	(0)
1997	Atlético B	14	(1)
1998	→ Mallorca (loan)	7	(0)
1998–1999	Alavés	24	(0)
1999–2000	Numancia	28	(1)
2000–2001	Elche	24	(2)
2002	Sport		
2003	União São João		
2003	Paulista		

International career
1985	Brazil U17	4	(0)
- * Club domestic league appearances and goals

Ivan Rocha Limas (born 14 January 1969), known as Rocha, is a Brazilian former professional footballer who played mainly as a central defender but also as a left back.

== Club career ==
Rocha was born in São Paulo, and joined São Paulo FC's youth setup in 1983. Promoted to the first team in 1987, he was first-choice during the team's 1989 Campeonato Paulista-winning campaign while also being a regular starter during the 1990 season where they finished runners-up in the Série A; in the 1992 edition of the Copa Libertadores he featured in both legs of the finals as a left back, position where he acted during most of his spell under Telê Santana as the manager believed he was "more skillful" than Ronaldão, the habitual starter.

In 1992, 23-year-old Rocha joined Real Valladolid and helped to promotion from Segunda División in his first year. Having played in only 21 matches the defender scored an impressive nine goals (mostly from penalties), second-best in the squad with José Amavisca.

After another season, Rocha signed with fellow La Liga club Atlético Madrid. He played very rarely for the Colchoneros, also being loaned several times during his stint in Madrid (Valladolid again, CD Logroñés and RCD Mallorca) and being afflicted by several injuries.

Atlético released Rocha in the summer of 1998, and he played three more seasons in the country, one apiece with Deportivo Alavés, CD Numancia and Elche CF, the latter in the second division. In 2002 he returned to his country and appeared for Sport Club do Recife, União São João Esporte Clube and Paulista Futebol Clube, retiring at the age of 34 and later becoming a players' agent.

== Honours ==
São Paulo

- Campeonato Brasileiro Série A: 1991
- Campeonato Paulista: 1989, 1991
- Copa Libertadores: 1992
