= 1997–98 La Liga =

67th season of La Liga

La Liga
- Season: 1997–98
- Dates: 30 August 1997 – 16 May 1998
- Champions: Barcelona; 15th title
- Relegated: Compostela (relegation playoff); Mérida; Sporting Gijón
- Champions League: Real Madrid (as Champions League winners); Barcelona; Athletic Bilbao
- Cup Winners' Cup: Mallorca (as Copa del Rey runners-up)
- UEFA Cup: Real Sociedad; Celta Vigo; Atlético Madrid; Real Betis
- Intertoto Cup: Valencia; Espanyol
- Matches: 380
- Goals: 1,009 (2.66 per match)
- Top goalscorer: Christian Vieri (24 goals)
- Biggest home win: Salamanca 6–0 Valencia (12 April 1998)
- Biggest away win: Real Oviedo 0–5 Real Sociedad (19 October 1997)
- Highest scoring: Salamanca 5–4 Atlético Madrid (21 March 1998)

The 1997–98 La Liga season was the 67th since its establishment. It began on 30 August 1997, and concluded on 16 May 1998.

On 29 March 1998, following Sporting Gijón's 0–0 draw with Zaragoza, combined with Racing Santander's 4–3 loss to Athletic Bilbao, Sporting Gijón became the first team in La Liga history to be relegated in March, ending the season with a league-record lowest points tally of just 13.

== Promotion and relegation ==
Twenty teams competed in the league – the top seventeen teams from the previous season and the three teams promoted from the Segunda División. The promoted teams were Mérida, Salamanca (both teams returning after a season's absence) and Mallorca (returning after a five-year absence). They replaced Rayo Vallecano, Extremadura, Sevilla FC, Hércules CF and CD Logrones after spending time in the top flight for two, one, twenty two, one and one years respectively. Starting from this season, twenty teams contested in the La Liga as opposed to previous seasons with twenty-two teams.

== Team information ==
=== Clubs and locations ===
Location of teams in La Liga 1997–98
Canary Islands

1997–98 season was composed of the following clubs:

| Team | Stadium | Capacity |
|---|---|---|
| Barcelona | Camp Nou | 98,772 |
| Real Madrid | Santiago Bernabéu | 80,354 |
| Espanyol | Estadi Olímpic de Montjuïc | 55,926 |
| Atlético Madrid | Vicente Calderón | 55,005 |
| Valencia | Mestalla | 55,000 |
| Real Betis | Benito Villamarín | 52,132 |
| Athletic Bilbao | San Mamés | 39,750 |
| Deportivo de La Coruña | Riazor | 34,600 |
| Real Zaragoza | La Romareda | 34,596 |
| Celta de Vigo | Balaídos | 32,500 |
| Real Sociedad | Anoeta | 32,200 |
| Valladolid | José Zorrilla | 27,846 |
| Sporting de Gijón | El Molinón | 25,885 |
| Real Oviedo | Carlos Tartiere | 23,500 |
| Tenerife | Heliodoro Rodríguez López | 22,824 |
| Racing de Santander | El Sardinero | 22,222 |
| Mallorca | Lluís Sitjar | 18,000 |
| Salamanca | El Helmántico | 17,341 |
| Mérida | Estadio Romano | 14,600 |
| Compostela | San Lázaro | 12,000 |

== League table ==
| Pos | Team | Pld | W | D | L | GF | GA | GD | Pts | Qualification or relegation |
|---|---|---|---|---|---|---|---|---|---|---|
| 1 | Barcelona (C) | 38 | 23 | 5 | 10 | 78 | 56 | +22 | 74 | Qualification for the Champions League group stage |
| 2 | Athletic Bilbao | 38 | 17 | 14 | 7 | 52 | 42 | +10 | 65 | Qualification for the Champions League second qualifying round |
| 3 | Real Sociedad | 38 | 16 | 15 | 7 | 60 | 37 | +23 | 63 (Note: RMA 2–0 RSO; RSO 4–2 RMA) | Qualification for the UEFA Cup first round |
| 4 | Real Madrid | 38 | 17 | 12 | 9 | 63 | 45 | +18 | 63 | Qualification for the Champions League group stage (Note: Real Madrid was qualified directly for the 1998–99 UEFA Champions League as holders.) |
| 5 | Mallorca | 38 | 16 | 12 | 10 | 55 | 39 | +16 | 60 (Note: MLL: 9 pts; CEL: 5 pts; ATM: 2 pts) | Qualification for the Cup Winners' Cup first round (Note: Since Barcelona, winners of 1997–98 Copa del Rey, was qualified for the 1998–99 UEFA Champions League, losing cup finalists RCD Mallorca earned a spot in the first round of the 1998–99 UEFA Cup Winners' Cup.) |
| 6 | Celta Vigo | 38 | 17 | 9 | 12 | 54 | 47 | +7 | 60 | Qualification for the UEFA Cup first round |
| 7 | Atlético Madrid | 38 | 16 | 12 | 10 | 79 | 56 | +23 | 60 | Qualification for the UEFA Cup first round |
| 8 | Real Betis | 38 | 17 | 8 | 13 | 49 | 50 | −1 | 59 | Qualification for the UEFA Cup first round |
| 9 | Valencia | 38 | 16 | 7 | 15 | 58 | 52 | +6 | 55 | Qualification for the Intertoto Cup third round |
| 10 | Espanyol | 38 | 12 | 17 | 9 | 44 | 31 | +13 | 53 | Qualification for the Intertoto Cup second round |
| 11 | Valladolid | 38 | 13 | 11 | 14 | 36 | 47 | −11 | 50 | |
| 12 | Deportivo La Coruña | 38 | 12 | 13 | 13 | 44 | 46 | −2 | 49 | |
| 13 | Zaragoza | 38 | 12 | 12 | 14 | 45 | 53 | −8 | 48 | |
| 14 | Racing Santander | 38 | 12 | 9 | 17 | 46 | 55 | −9 | 45 (Note: RAC: 8 pts; SAL: 4 pts → SAL 2-0 TEN; TEN: 4 pts → TEN 2-0 SAL) | |
| 15 | Salamanca | 38 | 12 | 9 | 17 | 46 | 46 | 0 | 45 | |
| 16 | Tenerife | 38 | 11 | 12 | 15 | 44 | 57 | −13 | 45 | |
| 17 | Compostela (R) | 38 | 11 | 11 | 16 | 56 | 66 | −10 | 44 | Qualification for the relegation playoffs |
| 18 | Oviedo (O) | 38 | 9 | 13 | 16 | 36 | 51 | −15 | 40 | Qualification for the relegation playoffs |
| 19 | Mérida (R) | 38 | 9 | 12 | 17 | 33 | 53 | −20 | 39 | Relegation to the Segunda División |
| 20 | Sporting Gijón (R) | 38 | 2 | 7 | 29 | 31 | 80 | −49 | 13 | Relegation to the Segunda División |

Source: LFP
Rules for classification: 1) points; 2) head-to-head points; 3) head-to-head goal difference; 4) head-to-head goals scored; 5) goal difference; 6) number of goals scored.
(C) Champions; (O) Play-off winners; (R) Relegated

== Results ==
| Home \ Away | ATH | ATM | FCB | BET | CEL | COM | RCD | ESP | MLL | MER | RAC | RMA | ROV | RSO | SAL | RSG | TEN | VCF | VLD | ZAR |
|---|---|---|---|---|---|---|---|---|---|---|---|---|---|---|---|---|---|---|---|---|
| Athletic Bilbao | | 1–0 | 3–0 | 0–0 | 2–1 | 2–0 | 1–1 | 1–3 | 3–1 | 5–1 | 4–3 | 1–1 | 3–0 | 1–1 | 1–0 | 2–2 | 3–0 | 0–3 | 2–0 | 1–0 |
| Atlético Madrid | 3–0 | | 5–2 | 0–0 | 3–3 | 3–1 | 3–0 | 0–2 | 2–3 | 4–0 | 2–1 | 1–1 | 4–1 | 2–2 | 1–1 | 2–1 | 2–2 | 3–1 | 5–0 | 2–1 |
| Barcelona | 4–0 | 3–1 | | 1–3 | 3–2 | 2–0 | 2–1 | 3–1 | 0–0 | 3–1 | 2–0 | 3–0 | 2–1 | 3–0 | 1–4 | 2–1 | 3–2 | 3–4 | 1–2 | 1–0 |
| Betis | 1–1 | 2–3 | 0–2 | | 2–0 | 1–0 | 1–0 | 1–3 | 2–1 | 2–1 | 0–2 | 3–2 | 1–1 | 0–0 | 2–1 | 2–1 | 3–0 | 1–0 | 3–0 | 3–3 |
| Celta de Vigo | 1–1 | 1–1 | 3–1 | 2–0 | | 3–3 | 2–1 | 1–0 | 1–0 | 2–0 | 1–2 | 2–1 | 3–0 | 2–1 | 4–1 | 1–0 | 0–0 | 1–0 | 2–0 | 2–1 |
| Compostela | 1–4 | 2–1 | 2–2 | 2–3 | 0–0 | | 0–0 | 1–1 | 2–2 | 3–0 | 3–1 | 2–3 | 1–0 | 1–3 | 2–0 | 2–0 | 1–2 | 3–1 | 0–0 | 2–0 |
| Deportivo La Coruña | 3–0 | 2–2 | 3–1 | 2–0 | 1–1 | 2–6 | | 1–1 | 1–1 | 0–1 | 4–1 | 2–2 | 2–1 | 1–1 | 1–0 | 2–1 | 1–0 | 1–2 | 1–3 | 2–1 |
| Espanyol | 0–1 | 2–2 | 1–1 | 5–0 | 1–1 | 1–0 | 2–0 | | 1–0 | 0–0 | 0–0 | 1–0 | 0–0 | 0–3 | 3–0 | 1–1 | 2–0 | 3–0 | 2–0 | 0–1 |
| Mallorca | 4–0 | 2–1 | 0–1 | 1–2 | 4–2 | 2–1 | 0–0 | 2–2 | | 1–0 | 2–1 | 0–0 | 1–1 | 0–1 | 1–0 | 6–2 | 5–1 | 2–1 | 1–1 | 0–2 |
| Mérida | 0–0 | 2–1 | 1–2 | 1–3 | 4–0 | 3–3 | 1–0 | 1–1 | 0–0 | | 1–2 | 2–2 | 2–1 | 3–1 | 1–0 | 1–0 | 1–1 | 1–0 | 0–0 | 0–1 |
| Racing Santander | 0–0 | 0–1 | 2–4 | 2–0 | 2–1 | 1–1 | 0–1 | 1–1 | 0–1 | 2–0 | | 1–2 | 0–0 | 3–1 | 1–0 | 4–1 | 2–1 | 2–1 | 1–2 | 2–3 |
| Real Madrid | 0–0 | 1–1 | 2–3 | 1–0 | 3–1 | 2–1 | 0–0 | 2–1 | 2–0 | 1–0 | 2–2 | | 5–1 | 2–0 | 1–0 | 3–0 | 3–0 | 1–2 | 3–1 | 0–2 |
| Oviedo | 1–2 | 0–2 | 1–0 | 0–0 | 3–1 | 1–1 | 1–1 | 1–1 | 0–1 | 2–0 | 0–1 | 1–1 | | 0–5 | 2–0 | 2–1 | 1–0 | 0–0 | 0–1 | 3–0 |
| Real Sociedad | 1–1 | 0–0 | 2–2 | 2–0 | 2–1 | 5–1 | 1–1 | 2–0 | 1–0 | 2–1 | 1–0 | 4–2 | 2–2 | | 1–1 | 2–1 | 1–1 | 1–1 | 3–0 | 0–1 |
| Salamanca | 0–0 | 5–4 | 4–3 | 0–0 | 0–1 | 0–1 | 4–1 | 2–1 | 1–1 | 3–1 | 0–0 | 0–2 | 0–2 | 0–0 | | 4–0 | 2–0 | 6–0 | 1–0 | 1–2 |
| Sporting Gijón | 1–2 | 2–3 | 1–4 | 2–3 | 0–1 | 0–2 | 0–3 | 1–0 | 1–3 | 0–0 | 2–1 | 0–2 | 1–2 | 0–2 | 1–1 | | 0–2 | 0–3 | 1–2 | 2–3 |
| Tenerife | 0–2 | 2–2 | 1–1 | 3–1 | 1–3 | 5–1 | 0–0 | 0–0 | 1–4 | 1–1 | 2–2 | 4–3 | 1–0 | 0–0 | 2–0 | 2–1 | | 3–2 | 1–0 | 0–0 |
| Valencia | 1–1 | 4–1 | 0–3 | 1–0 | 2–1 | 4–1 | 1–0 | 0–0 | 0–0 | 3–0 | 6–1 | 0–2 | 1–1 | 3–2 | 0–1 | 2–2 | 1–2 | | 1–2 | 2–1 |
| Valladolid | 3–0 | 2–1 | 1–2 | 1–3 | 0–0 | 4–1 | 1–0 | 0–0 | 0–0 | 0–0 | 0–0 | 1–1 | 1–0 | 0–4 | 1–2 | 1–1 | 2–1 | 0–3 | | 4–0 |
| Zaragoza | 1–1 | 1–5 | 1–2 | 3–1 | 1–0 | 2–2 | 1–2 | 1–1 | 2–3 | 1–1 | 2–0 | 2–2 | 3–3 | 0–0 | 1–1 | 0–0 | 1–0 | 0–2 | 0–0 | |

Source: LFP (in Spanish)
Legend: Blue = home team win; Yellow = draw; Red = away team win.

== Relegation playoff ==
| Team 1 | Agg. | Team 2 | 1st leg | 2nd leg |
|---|---|---|---|---|
| Villarreal CF | (a) 1–1 | SD Compostela | 0–0 | 1–1 |
| Real Oviedo | 4–3 | UD Las Palmas | 3–0 | 1–3 |

=== First leg ===
| 21 May 1998 | Villarreal CF | 0–0 | SD Compostela | Villarreal |
| 21:45 | | Report (in Spanish) | | Stadium: El Madrigal; Attendance: 9,000; Referee: Víctor Esquinas Torres (Community of Madrid) |

| 22 May 1998 | Real Oviedo | 3–0 | UD Las Palmas | Oviedo |
| 21:45 | Iván Ania 9' (pen.), 27'; Dely Valdés 59' | Report (in Spanish) | | Stadium: Carlos Tartiere; Attendance: 23,500; Referee: Eduardo Iturralde González (Basque Country (autonomous community)) |

=== Second leg ===
| 24 May 1998 | SD Compostela | 1–1 (1–1 agg.) | Villarreal CF | Santiago de Compostela |
| 21:45 | Chiba 57' | Report (in Spanish) | Alberto 7' | Stadium: Multiusos de San Lázaro; Attendance: 11,500; Referee: Manuel Díaz Vega (Asturias) |

| 25 May 1998 | UD Las Palmas | 3–1 (3–4 agg.) | Real Oviedo | Las Palmas de Gran Canaria |
| 22:00 | Gamboa 20'; Walter Pico 65'; Paquito 66' | Report (in Spanish) | Gamboa 29' (o.g.) | Stadium: Insular; Attendance: 21,000; Referee: Antonio Jesús López Nieto (Andalusia) |

== Awards ==
=== Pichichi Trophy ===
The Pichichi Trophy is awarded to the player who scores the most goals in a season.

| Rank | Player | Club | Goals |
|---|---|---|---|
| 1 | (Italy) Christian Vieri | Atlético Madrid | 24 |
| 2 | (Brazil) Rivaldo | Barcelona | 19 |
| 3 | (Spain) Luis Enrique | Barcelona | 18 |
| 4 | (Federal Republic of Yugoslavia) Darko Kovačević | Real Sociedad | 17 |
| 5 | (Bulgaria) Lyuboslav Penev | Compostela | 16 |
| 6 | (Portugal) Pauleta | Salamanca | 15 |
| 7 | (Uruguay) Fernando Correa | Racing Santander | 14 |
| 8 | (Argentina) Gabriel Amato | Mallorca | 13 |
| 8 | (Argentina) Juan Esnáider | Espanyol | 13 |
| 8 | (Croatia) Alen Peternac | Valladolid | 13 |

=== Zamora Trophy ===
The Ricardo Zamora Trophy is awarded to the goalkeeper with the lowest ratio of goals conceded to matches played.

| Rank | Player | Club | Goals against | Matches | Average |
|---|---|---|---|---|---|
| 1 | (Spain) Toni | Espanyol | 31 | 37 | 0.84 |
| 2 | (Spain) Alberto | Real Sociedad | 37 | 38 | 0.97 |
| 3 | (Romania) Bogdan Stelea | Salamanca | 32 | 30 | 1.07 |
| 4 | (Spain) Imanol Etxeberria | Athletic Bilbao | 42 | 38 | 1.11 |
| 5 | (Spain) Andoni Zubizarreta | Valencia | 40 | 34 | 1.18 |

== Attendances ==
| # | Club | Avg. attendance | Highest |
|---|---|---|---|
| 1 | FC Barcelona | 74,053 | 115,000 |
| 2 | Real Madrid | 73,368 | 104,000 |
| 3 | Valencia CF | 44,684 | 54,000 |
| 4 | Real Betis | 38,816 | 47,500 |
| 5 | Athletic Club | 36,158 | 41,000 |
| 6 | Atlético de Madrid | 30,895 | 58,000 |
| 7 | Real Zaragoza | 23,053 | 35,000 |
| 8 | Celta de Vigo | 22,714 | 32,000 |
| 9 | Real Sociedad | 22,651 | 28,399 |
| 10 | RCD Espanyol | 21,921 | 31,500 |
| 11 | Deportivo de La Coruña | 21,395 | 33,000 |
| 12 | CD Tenerife | 19,068 | 22,500 |
| 13 | Real Valladolid | 17,966 | 23,000 |
| 14 | Racing de Santander | 17,237 | 22,000 |
| 15 | RCD Mallorca | 16,966 | 30,800 |
| 16 | Real Oviedo | 16,500 | 23,500 |
| 17 | Real Sporting de Gijón | 15,154 | 22,000 |
| 18 | UD Salamanca | 12,916 | 20,199 |
| 19 | Mérida UD | 10,789 | 15,000 |
| 20 | SD Compostela | 8,381 | 14,000 |

== See also ==
- 1997–98 Segunda División
- 1997–98 Copa del Rey
