= 1998–99 RCD Mallorca season =

RCD Mallorca
1998–99 season
- President: Antonio Asensio
- Manager: Héctor Cúper
- Stadium: Lluis Sitjar
- La Liga: 3rd (in 1999–2000 UEFA Champions League)
- Copa del Rey: Quarter finals
- Cup Winners' Cup: Runners-up
- Supercopa de España: Winners
- Top goalscorer: League: Dani García (12); All: Dani García (20)
Home colours	Away colours

== Summary ==
The club with a new owner Grupo Zeta replaced Bartolomé Beltrán and appointed Antonio Asensio as new President

== Squad ==
Squad at end of season

Note: Flags indicate national team as defined under FIFA eligibility rules; some limited exceptions apply. Players may hold more than one non-FIFA nationality.

No.	Pos.	Nation	Player
1	GK	ESP	César Gálvez
2	MF	ARG	Mauricio Pineda
3	DF	ESP	Miquel Soler
4	DF	ARG	Gustavo Siviero
5	DF	ESP	Marcelino
6	DF	ESP	Paco
7	DF	ESP	Lluís Carreras
8	FW	ESP	Carlitos
9	FW	ESP	Dani García
10	MF	ARG	Ariel Ibagaza
11	MF	YUG	Jovan Stanković
12	DF	CMR	Lauren

No.	Pos.	Nation	Player
13	GK	ARG	Carlos Roa
14	MF	ESP	Javier Olaizola
15	MF	ESP	Paco Soler
16	MF	ESP	Óscar Arpón
21	FW	YUG	Veljko Paunović
22	FW	ARG	Leonardo Biagini
23	MF	ESP	Vicente Engonga
24	FW	ARG	Ariel López
26	DF	ESP	Fernando Niño
27	FW	ESP	Diego Tristán
30	FW	ESP	Albert Luque
33	GK	ARG	Leo Franco

=== Transfers ===
In
Pos.	Name	from	Type
DF	Miquel Soler	Real Zaragoza	
DF	Gustavo Siviero	Lanús	
MF	Lauren	Levante UD	
AM	Ariel Ibagaza	Lanús	
FW	Dani García	Real Madrid	
FW	Leo Biagini	CP Mérida	
FW	Ariel Lopez	Genoa	
MF	Veljko Paunovic	Atlético Madrid	loan
FW	Carlitos	Sevilla CF	

Out
Pos.	Name	To	Type
DF	Enrique Romero	Deportivo	
DF	Ivan Campo	Real Madrid	
MF	Oscar Mena	Atlético Madrid	
MF	Juan Carlos Valeron	Atlético Madrid	
FW	Gabriel Amato	Glasgow Rangers	
FW	Gabriel Moya	Sevilla CF	
FW	Santiago Ezquerro	Athletic Bilbao	loan ended
AM	Palhinha	Flamengo	
DF	Ivan Rocha	Deportivo Alavés	
MF	Francisco Rufete	CD Málaga	
FW	Jose Galvez	Real Betis	
MF	Xabier Eskurza	Real Oviedo	

==== Winter ====
In
Pos.	Name	from	Type
DF	Héctor Pineda	Udinese Calcio	loan

Out
Pos.	Name	To	Type
MF	Francisco Rufete	Málaga	

== Competitions ==
=== La Liga ===
==== League table ====
Pos	Team	Pld	W	D	L	GF	GA	GD	Pts	Qualification or relegation
1	Barcelona (C)	38	24	7	7	87	43	+44	79	Qualification for the Champions League group stage
2	Real Madrid	38	21	5	12	77	62	+15	68	Qualification for the Champions League group stage
3	Mallorca	38	20	6	12	48	31	+17	66	Qualification for the Champions League third qualifying round
4	Valencia	38	19	8	11	63	39	+24	65	Qualification for the Champions League third qualifying round
5	Celta Vigo	38	17	13	8	69	41	+28	64	Qualification for the UEFA Cup first round

Source: LFP
Rules for classification: 1) points; 2) head-to-head points; 3) head-to-head goal difference; 4) head-to-head goals scored; 5) goal difference; 6) number of goals scored.
(C) Champions

==== Positions by round ====
Round	1	2	3	4	5	6	7	8	9	10	11	12	13	14	15	16	17	18	19	20	21	22	23	24	25	26	27	28	29	30	31	32	33	34	35	36	37	38
Ground	A	H	A	H	A	H	H	A	H	A	H	A	H	A	H	A	H	A	H	H	A	H	A	H	A	A	H	A	H	A	H	A	H	A	H	A	H	A
Result	D	W	W	D	D	W	W	D	W	L	W	L	W	W	D	L	W	L	L	W	L	W	W	D	L	W	L	W	W	L	W	W	W	L	W	L	W	L
Position	7	3	2	3	4	3	1	2	1	3	1	1	1	1	1	1	1	2	5	3	5	2	2	2	4	4	6	6	4	6	3	3	2	2	2	4	2	3

Source: https://www.worldfootball.net/competition/ro11027/md38/results-and-standings/
A = Away; H = Home; W = Win; D = Draw; L = Loss; = Leader, 1999–2000 UEFA Champions League group stage; = 1999–2000 UEFA Champions League group stage; = 1999–2000 UEFA Champions League qualifying round; = 1999–2000 UEFA Cup; = 1999 UEFA Intertoto Cup; = 1999–2000 Segunda División

==== Matches ====
30 August 1998 1	UD Salamanca	0–0	Mallorca	Villares de la Reina
		Report		Stadium: El Helmántico

12 September 1998 2	Mallorca	2–0	RCD Espanyol	Palma de Mallorca
	Dani 25'; Ariel Lopez 49'	Report		Stadium: Estadio Lluis Sitjar

19 September 1998 3	Real Sociedad	0–1	Mallorca	San Sebastián
		Report	Marcelino 15'	Stadium: Estadio Anoeta

26 September 1998 4	Mallorca	0–0	Real Oviedo	Palma de Mallorca
		Report		Stadium: Estadio Lluis Sitjar

4 October 1998 5	CD Tenerife	1–1	Mallorca	Santa Cruz de Tenerife
	Andre Luiz 12'	Report	Biagini 54'	Stadium: Estadio Heliodoro Rodriguez

17 October 1998 6	Mallorca	2–1	Deportivo Alavés	Palma de Mallorca
	Paunovic 60'; Biagini 69'	Report	Desio 88' (pen.)	Stadium: Estadio Lluis Sitjar

24 October 1998 7	Mallorca	4–0	Atlético de Madrid	Palma de Mallorca
	Paunovic 17'; Lauren Etame 47'; Iovan Stankovic 52' (pen.); F. Soler 79'	Report		Stadium: Estadio Lluis Sitjar

31 October 1998 8	Deportivo La Coruña	1–1	Mallorca	A Coruña
	Djalminha 42' (pen.)	Report	Biagini 32'	Stadium: Riazor

7 November 1998 9	Mallorca	1–0	Villarreal CF	Palma de Mallorca
	Dani 32' (pen.)	Report		Stadium: Estadio Lluis Sitjar

14 November 1998 10	Real Valladolid	1–0	Mallorca	Valladolid
	Peternac 18'	Report		Stadium: Estadio José Zorrilla

21 November 1998 11	Mallorca	1–0	FC Barcelona	Palma de Mallorca
	Sergi 21' (own goal)	Report		Stadium: Estadio Lluis Sitjar

29 November 1998 12	Athletic de Bilbao	1–0	Mallorca	Bilbao
	Urzaiz 6'	Report		Stadium: San Mamés

5 December 1998 13	Mallorca	1–0	Real Betis	Palma de Mallorca
	Dani 82'	Report		Stadium: Estadio Lluis Sitjar

12 December 1998 14	Real Zaragoza	0–1	Mallorca	Zaragoza
		Report	Marcelino 19'	Stadium: La Romareda

19 December 1998 15	Mallorca	1–1	Racing de Santander	Palma de Mallorca
	Dani 55'	Report	Victor 71'	Stadium: Estadio Lluis Sitjar

2 January 1999 16	CF Extremadura	1–0	Mallorca	Almendralejo
	Dure 30'	Report		Stadium: Francisco de la Hera

9 January 1999 17	Mallorca	2–1	Real Madrid	Palma de Mallorca
	Ibagaza 8'; Sanchis 27' (o.g.); Olaizola (yellow card); Engonga (yellow card)	Report	Seedorf 46'; Hierro (yellow card); Sanchis (yellow card) (yellow-red card); Guti (yellow card); Šuker (yellow card)	Stadium: Estadio Lluis Sitjar; Referee: Alfonso Perez Burrull

15 January 1999 18	Celta de Vigo	4–2	Mallorca	Vigo
	Karpin 26'; Karpin 56'; Djorovic 86'; Revivo 90'	Report	Ariel Lopez 22'; Biagini 51'	Stadium: Balaídos

23 January 1999 19	Mallorca	0–1	Valencia CF	Palma de Mallorca
		Report	Claudio López 49'	Stadium: Estadio Lluis Sitjar

29 January 1999 20	Mallorca	1–0	UD Salamanca	Palma de Mallorca
	Dani 53'	Report		Stadium: Estadio Lluis Sitjar

7 February 1999 21	RCD Espanyol	1–0	Mallorca	Barcelona
	Benitez 42'	Report		Stadium: Olímpic Lluís Companys

12 February 1999 22	Mallorca	1–0	Real Sociedad	Palma de Mallorca
	Biagini 68' (pen.)	Report		Stadium: Estadio Lluis Sitjar

20 February 1999 23	Real Oviedo	1–3	Mallorca	Oviedo
	[Pompei;	Report	Dani 1'; Paunovic 6', Dani 85'	Stadium: Carlos Tartiere

27 February 1999 24	Mallorca	1–1	CD Tenerife	Palma de Mallorca
	Dani 12'	Report	Alexis 43'	Stadium: Estadio Lluis Sitjar

6 March 1999 25	Deportivo Alavés	2–0	Mallorca	Vitoria
	Julio Salinas 68'; Julio Salinas 79'	Report		Stadium: Mendizorroza

12 March 1999 26	Atlético de Madrid	1–2	Mallorca	Madrid
	Jose Mari 20'	Report	Chamot 8' (own goal); Paunovic 30'	Stadium: Estadio Vicente Calderón

21 March 1999 27	Mallorca	1–2	Deportivo La Coruña	Palma de Mallorca
	Ibagaza 90'	Report	Marcelino 20' (own goal); Ziani 53'	Stadium: Estadio Lluis Sitjar

3 April 1999 28	Villarreal CF	0–2	Mallorca	Villarreal
		Report	Biagini 75'; Dani 88'	Stadium: El Madrigal

10 April 1999 29	Mallorca	1–0	Real Valladolid	Palma de Mallorca
	Dani 53'	Report		Stadium: Estadio Lluis Sitjar

17 April 1999 30	FC Barcelona	2–1	RCD Mallorca	Barcelona
	de Boer 4'; Kluivert 24' (pen.)	Report	Biagini 90'	Stadium: Camp Nou

25 April 1999 31	RCD Mallorca	6–1	Athletic de Bilbao	Palma de Mallorca
	Biagini 2'; Biagini 41'; Biagini 45'; Ibagaza 55'; Marcelino 62'; Dani 85'	Report	Larrazabal 60' (pen.)	Stadium: Estadio Lluis Sitjar

2 May 1999 32	Real Betis	1–3	Mallorca	Sevilla
	Oli 49'	Report	Stankovic 12'; Ibagaza 65'; Paunovic 74'	Stadium: Estadio Benito Villamarin

9 May 1999 33	Mallorca	1–0	Real Zaragoza	Palma de Mallorca
	Biagini 42' (pen.)	Report		Stadium: Estadio Lluis Sitjar

14 May 1999 34	Racing de Santander	1–0	Mallorca	Santander
	Ismael 63'	Report		Stadium: El Sardinero

23 May 1999 35	Mallorca	2–0	CF Extremadura	Palma de Mallorca
	Ariel Lopez 44'; Stankovic 72'	Report		Stadium: Estadio Lluis Sitjar

30 May 1999 36	Real Madrid	2–1	Mallorca	Madrid
	Morientes 32'; Morientes 86'	Report	Dani 90'	Stadium: Estadio Santiago Bernabéu

13 June 1999 37	Mallorca	2–0	Celta de Vigo	Palma de Mallorca
	Ibagaza 34'; Stankovic 90'	Report		Stadium: Estadio Lluis Sitjar

19 June 1999 38	Valencia CF	3–0	Mallorca	Valencia
	Ilie 12'; Ilie 66'; Mendieta 51'	Report		Stadium: Estadio Mestalla

=== Copa del Rey ===
Eightfinals

19 January 1999	Real Betis	0–1	RCD Mallorca	Sevilla
				Stadium: Estadio Benito Villamarin

2 February 1999	RCD Mallorca	1–0	Real Betis	Palma de Mallorca
				Stadium: Estadio Lluis Sitjar

==== Quarterfinals ====
17 February 1999	RCD Mallorca	1–1	Deportivo La Coruña	Mallorca
				Stadium: Estadio Lluis Sitjar

23 February 1999	Deportivo La Coruña	1–0	RCD Mallorca	La Coruña
				Stadium: Estadio Riazor

=== Cup Winners' Cup ===
==== First round ====
17 September 1998 1	Heart of Midlothian (Scotland)	0–1	(Spain) Mallorca	Edinburgh
		[ Report]	Marcelino 17'	Stadium: Tynecastle Stadium; Attendance: 13,573; Referee: Alfredo Trentalange (Italy)

1 October 1998 2	Mallorca (Spain)	1–1	(Scotland) Heart of Midlothian	Palma de Mallorca
	Ariel López 49'		78' Hamilton	Stadium: Estadio Lluís Sitjar; Attendance: 12,218; Referee: Hermann Albrecht (Germany)

Before the game, the delegate of Hearts complained about the non-standard goal height, and the referee measured it to be one centimeter lower than regulation. Hearts agreed to play the game anyway.

==== Second round ====
22 October 1998 1	Genk (Belgium)	1–1	(Spain) Mallorca	Brussels
	Oularé 71'		56' Dani	Stadium: King Baudouin Stadium; Attendance: 24,046; Referee: Konrad Plautz (Austria)

5 November 1998 2	Mallorca (Spain)	0–0	(Belgium) Genk	Palma
				Stadium: Estadio Lluís Sitjar; Attendance: 14,555; Referee: Rémi Harrel (France)

==== Quarter-final ====
4 March 1999 1	Varteks (Croatia)	0–0	(Spain) Mallorca	Varaždin
				Stadium: Gradski Stadion; Attendance: 9,400; Referee: Karl-Erik Nilsson (Sweden)

18 March 1999 2	Mallorca (Spain)	3–1	(Croatia) Varteks	Palma
	Ibagaza 53'; Paunović 55'; Dani 75'		Balajić 90'	Stadium: Estadio Lluís Sitjar; Attendance: 16,109; Referee: Ryszard Wójcik (Poland)

==== Semi-final ====
8 April 1999 1	Chelsea (England)	1–1	(Spain) Mallorca	Fulham,(West London)
	Flo 50'		Dani 32'	Stadium: Stamford Bridge; Attendance: 32,524; Referee: Dick Jol (Netherlands)

22 April 1999 2	Mallorca (Spain)	1–0	(England) Chelsea	Palma
	Biagini 15'			Stadium: Lluis Sitjar; Attendance: 18,848; Referee: Hellmut Krug (Germany)

==== Final ====
19 May 1999	Mallorca (Spain)	1–2	(Italy) Lazio	Birmingham
	Dani 11'		Vieri 7'; Nedvěd 81'	Stadium: Villa Park; Attendance: 35,021; Referee: (Austria) Günther Benkö

=== Supercopa de España ===
18 August 1998 1	Mallorca	2–1	FC Barcelona	Palma
22:00 CET	Dani García 57'; Stanković 81'		Xavi 16'	Stadium: Lluís Sitjar; Attendance: 12,000; Referee: López Nieto

22 August 1998 2	FC Barcelona	0–1	Mallorca	Barcelona
22:00 CET			29' Dani García	Stadium: Camp Nou; Attendance: 55,000; Referee: Díaz Vega

== Statistics ==
=== Players Statistics ===
No.	Pos	Nat	Player	Total		La Liga		Copa del Rey		Cup Winners' Cup	
No.	Pos	Nat	Player	Apps	Goals	Apps	Goals	Apps	Goals	Apps	Goals
13	GK	(Argentina) ARG	Carlos Roa	47	-36	35	-29	4	-2	8	-5
14	DF	(Spain) ESP	Javier Olaizola	48	0	36	0	3	0	9	0
5	DF	(Spain) ESP	Marcelino	47	4	34	3	4	0	9	1
4	DF	(Argentina) ARG	Gustavo Siviero	46	0	33	0	4	0	9	0
3	DF	(Spain) ESP	Miquel Soler	46	0	33+1	0	3	0	9	0
12	MF	(Cameroon) CMR	Lauren	45	1	33	1	3	0	9	0
23	MF	(Spain) ESP	Vicente Engonga	44	0	33	0	4	0	7	0
10	MF	(Argentina) ARG	Ariel Ibagaza	32	6	23+3	5	1+1	0	4	1
11	MF	(Federal Republic of Yugoslavia) YUG	Jovan Stanković	44	4	35+1	4	3	0	5	0
9	FW	(Spain) ESP	Dani	49	18	34+2	12	3+1	2	9	4
22	FW	(Argentina) ARG	Leo Biagini	41	12	25+6	11	2	0	7+1	1
1	GK	(Spain) ESP	Gálvez	4	-3	3	-2	0	0	1	-1
15	MF	(Spain) ESP	Paco Soler	38	1	17+12	1	3+1	0	2+3	0
24	FW	(Argentina) ARG	Ariel López	29	4	12+11	3	0+2	0	2+2	1
21	MF	(Federal Republic of Yugoslavia) YUG	Veljko Paunović	33	6	8+16	5	2+1	0	5+1	1
7	DF	(Spain) ESP	Lluis Carreras	27	0	7+11	0	1+1	0	2+5	0
26	DF	(Spain) ESP	Fernando Niño	21	0	6+10	0	0+1	0	0+4	0
16	MF	(Spain) ESP	Óscar Arpón	18	0	4+9	0	1	0	2+2	0
8	FW	(Spain) ESP	Carlitos	19	1	2+11	0	2+1	1	0+3	0
30	FW	(Spain) ESP	Albert Luque	6	0	2+3	0	0	0	0+1	0
2	MF	(Argentina) ARG	Mauricio Pineda	5	0	3+1	0	1	0		
6	DF	(Spain) ESP	Paco	0	0	0	0				
27	FW	(Spain) ESP	Diego Tristán	0	0	0	0				
33	GK	(Argentina) ARG	Leo Franco	0	0	0	0				

== See also ==
- RCD Mallorca
- 1998–99 La Liga
- 1998–99 Copa del Rey
- 1998–99 UEFA Cup Winners' Cup
