= 1999 UEFA Cup Winners' Cup final =

- Match programme cover
- Event: 1998–99 UEFA Cup Winners' Cup
Mallorca	Lazio
(Spain)	(Italy)
1	2
- Date: 19 May 1999
- Venue: Villa Park, Birmingham
- Man of the Match: Christian Vieri (Lazio)
- Referee: Günter Benkö (Austria)
- Attendance: 33,021

The 1999 UEFA Cup Winners' Cup final was a football match between Mallorca of Spain and Lazio of Italy played on 19 May 1999 at Villa Park, Birmingham, England. It was the final match of the 1998–99 season of the UEFA Cup Winners' Cup and the culmination of the competition before it was absorbed into the UEFA Cup the following season. Mallorca were appearing in their first final in their first season in European competition, while Lazio were also appearing in their first Cup Winners' Cup final. It was their second European final in succession after reaching the final of the UEFA Cup the previous season.

Each club needed to progress through four rounds to reach the final, which were contested over two legs, with a match at each team's home ground. Mallorca's ties were all close affairs. They beat Genk of Belgium on the away goals rule after the tie finished 1–1 on aggregate. They beat defending champions Chelsea of England by a single goal. The majority of Lazio's ties were close affairs, two of which were decided on the away goals rule. The exception was their quarter-final tie against Greek team Panionios, which they won 7–0 on aggregate.

Watched by a crowd of 33,021, Lazio took the lead in the final when striker Christian Vieri scored in the 7th minute. They were not ahead for long as Mallorca equalised four minutes later when striker Dani scored. The match remained level for the majority of the match until the 81st minute when Lazio midfielder Pavel Nedvěd scored. With no further goals, Lazio won the match 2–1 to win the last Cup Winners' Cup and their first European trophy.

== Route to the final ==
=== Mallorca ===
Mallorca's route to the final
Round	Opposition	First leg	Second leg	Aggregate score
1st	Heart of Midlothian	1–0 (a)	1–1 (h)	2–1
2nd	Genk	1–1 (a)	0–0 (h)	1–1
Quarter-final	Varteks	0–0 (a)	3–1 (h)	3–1
Semi-final	Chelsea	1–1 (a)	1–0 (h)	2–1

Mallorca qualified for the UEFA Cup Winners' Cup by finishing as runners-up in the Spanish Copa del Rey. They lost to Barcelona 5–4 in a penalty shootout, but as Barcelona finished first in the 1997–98 La Liga, they qualified for the 1998–99 UEFA Champions League and Mallorca were awarded their spot in the Cup Winners' Cup. Mallorca's opponents in the first round were Scottish team Heart of Midlothian (Hearts). They won the first leg, held at Hearts' home ground Tynecastle, 1–0. The second leg was held at Mallorca's home ground, the Estadio Lluís Sitjar. Before the match, Hearts players protested that the goalposts at the same did not meet regulations. An inspection revealed there was a 10-centimetre (3.9 in) difference between one post and the other at both ends of the ground, this was due to the undulation of the pitch. Despite the issue, the match went ahead and finished 1–1. This meant Mallorca progressed to the second round 2–1 on aggregate. Genk of Belgium were the opposition in the second round. The first leg held at the King Baudouin Stadium in Belgium finished 1–1. The second leg ended in a 0–0 draw, which meant Mallorca won the tie on the away goals rule to progress to the quarter-finals.

Mallorca faced Croatian team Varteks in the quarter-finals. The first leg, held at Varteks home ground, Gradski Stadion, finished 0–0. Three goals from Ariel Ibagaza, Veljko Paunović, and Dani, despite a late goal from Varteks defender, Andrija Balajić, were enough to secure a 3–1 victory and their progression to the semi-finals. Their opponents in the semi-finals were English team, Chelsea, who had won the competition the previous season and were looking to become the first team to retain the competition. Mallorca went ahead in the first leg at Chelsea's home ground, Stamford Bridge, when Dani went past Chelsea goalkeeper Ed de Goey to score. Chelsea equalised in the 50th minute when striker Tore André Flo scored. Mallorca took an early lead in the second leg when Leonardo Biagini scored. Chelsea midfielder Roberto Di Matteo hit the crossbar 20 minutes from the end of the match and fellow midfielder Dennis Wise missed a header to equalise. They were unable to score and Mallorca won the match 1–0 to win 2–1 on aggregate and progress to the final in their first season in European competition.

=== Lazio ===
Lazio's route to the final
Round	Opposition	First leg	Second leg	Aggregate score
1st	Lausanne-Sport	1–1 (h)	2–2 (a)	3–3
2nd	Partizan	0–0 (h)	3–2 (a)	3–2
Quarter-final	Panionios	4–0 (a)	3–0 (h)	7–0
Semi-final	Lokomotiv Moscow	1–1 (a)	0–0 (h)	1–1

Lazio qualified for the Cup Winners' Cup after they won the 1997–98 Coppa Italia. They beat Milan 3–2 on aggregate in the final. Their opponents in the first round were Swiss team, Lausanne-Sport. The first leg finished in a 1–1 draw. The second leg also finished in a draw, this time the scores were 2–2. This meant that Lazio progressed to the second round due to the away goals rule. Partizan of Yugoslavia were the opposition in the second round. The first leg ended in a 0–0 draw and Lazio won the second leg 3–2 to progress to the quarter-finals.

They faced Greek team Panionios, Lazio won the first leg 4–0 and were able to rest some of their first-team players in the second leg. Midfielders Pavel Nedvěd and Dejan Stanković both scored before fellow midfielder, Iván de la Peña secured a 3–0 victory to secure Lazio's progression to the semi-finals. Their opponents were Lokomotiv Moscow of Russia. The Russian side went ahead in the first leg, at the Lokomotiv Stadium, when striker, Zaza Janashia, scored in the 61st minute. Lazio equalised in the 77th minute when substitute Alen Bokšić scored. They almost won the match three minutes from full-time, but a shot by Stanković was saved by Lokomotiv goalkeeper Ruslan Nigmatullin, the match finished 1–1. The second leg was ended in a 0–0 draw, which meant Lazio progressed to the final on the away goals rule after the tie finished 1–1 on aggregate.

== Match ==
=== Background ===
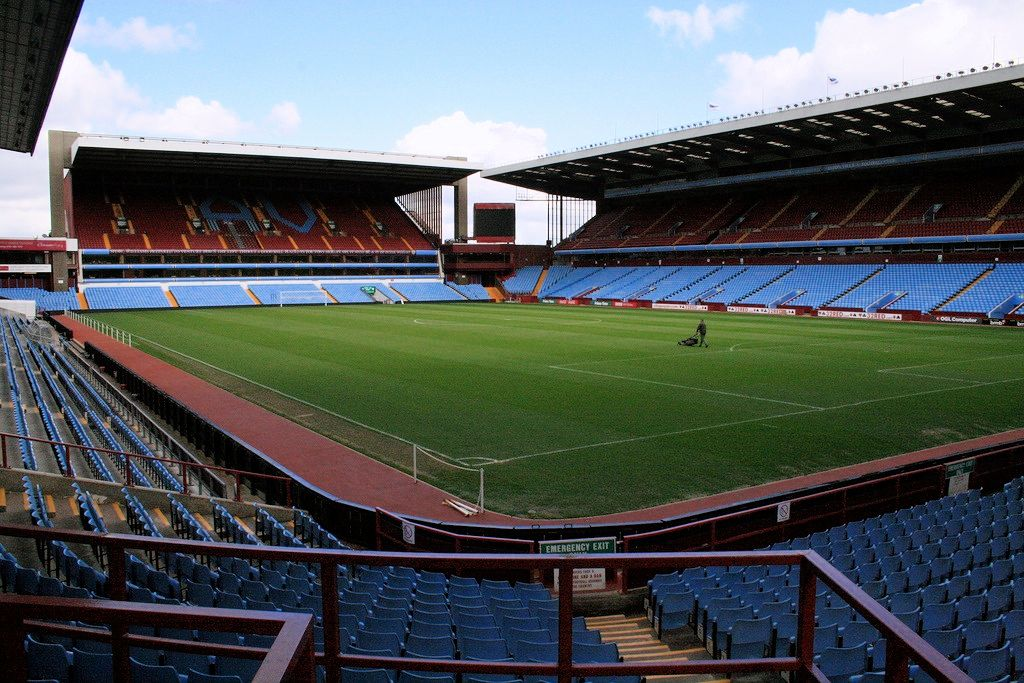
Villa Park hosted the final of the Cup Winners' Cup.

Mallorca were appearing in their first Cup Winners' Cup final in their first season in European competition. Lazio were also appearing in their first final in the competition, however, they had reached the final of the UEFA Cup the previous season, a match they lost 3–0 to fellow Italian team, Internazionale. The final was the last in the history of the competition. Founded in 1961, the Cup Winners' Cup was to be disbanded and incorporated into the UEFA Cup the following season.

Mallorca's last match before the final was against Racing Santander in the 1998–99 La Liga, they lost 1–0. Mallorca's record of 25 goals conceded in 33 games was the best in La Liga. Lazio's final match before the final was a 1–1 draw with Fiorentina. The result meant they slipped behind into second with a game left to play in the 1998–99 Serie A season. The Cup Winners' Cup final was held at the home of Aston Villa, Villa Park in Birmingham. The chairman of Aston Villa, Doug Ellis, considered Lazio to be the favourites: "Lazio are favourites if you listen to the bookmakers, but Mallorca have some very, very good players."

Lazio manager, Sven-Göran Eriksson, was adamant his side were eager to win the Cup Winners' Cup despite the possibility of winning Serie A the weekend after the final: "This is not a secondary objective. We must find the grit and determination, the courage and the energy, to win the cup." The difference in the two teams was emphasised before the final. Lazio had spent £73 million on new players the previous summer, while Mallorca were considered "an unfashionable island side" by The Guardian. This did not bother Mallorca striker Dani, who was adamant they could compete with Lazio: "We are conscious of the huge difference between the squads ... but we make up for that with concentration and teamwork to get results."

The choice of Austrian, Günter Benkö, as referee concerned the Italian media. Corriere dello Sport called him a "scandalous referee." They referred to him as "a sworn enemy of Italian squads," after he had sent off two Italian players in a UEFA under-21 international in 1996.

=== Summary ===
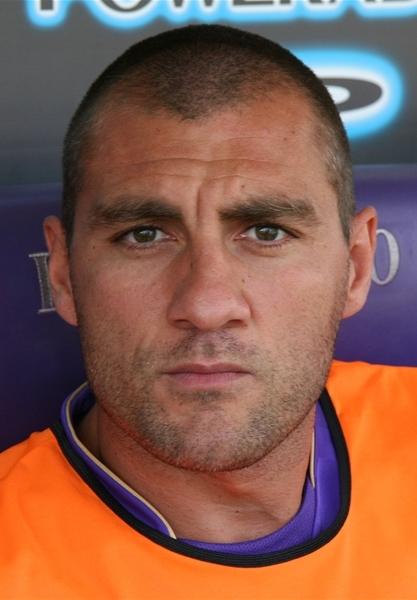
Christian Vieri scored the opening goal and was named man of the match.

Both teams lined up in a 4-4-2 formation with four defenders, four midfielders and two strikers. The opening minutes of the match were "breathtakingly open", according to The Guardian. A Vieri shot from 25 yards (23 m) was saved by Mallorca goalkeeper, Carlos Roa. The first goal was scored in the seventh minute when striker Christian Vieri headed a pass from Giuseppe Favalli past Roa. Four minutes later, Mallorca had equalised. Miquel Soler passed to Jovan Stanković who crossed from the right-hand side of the pitch which was converted past Lazio goalkeeper, Luca Marchegiani, by Dani. Vieri was injured when Roa's hand caught him in the head. He was carried off the field midway through the first half and his head bandaged before he returned. A long-range shot from Vieri was saved by Roa, while a Mallorca free-kick taken by Jovan Stanković passed through the Lazio penalty area without anyone touching the ball. A bicycle kick by Lazio striker Marcelo Salas, which Roa saved, was the last chance before the first half came to an end with the scores at 1–1.

According to Phil Shaw, writing in The Independent, "the open play which had characterised the start of the contest was markedly absent as the second period unfolded." Mallorca started the better of the two teams with Lauren causing problems down the right-hand side of the pitch. Dejan Stanković was caught in the face by Mallorca defender, Gustavo Siviero as he made an overhead clearance. Siviero was shown a yellow card and Dejan Stanković was replaced by Sérgio Conceição following the incident. Lazio had the best chance of the second half in the 60th minute when a free-kick by defender Siniša Mihajlović, from 32 yards (29 m) went just wide of the Mallorca goal. Minutes later, Roberto Mancini had a chance to score, but his shot hit the crossbar and he was deemed to be offside. A shot by Lauren was saved by Lazio goalkeeper, Marchegiani, minutes later. Mallorca had another chance to score as Jovan Stanković made his way into the Lazio penalty area. His shot went over the head of Marchegiani, but Alessandro Nesta headed the ball away from the Lazio goal. With nine minutes left to play, Lazio scored. Nedvěd volleyed a clearance past Roa in the Mallorca from 20 yards (18 m). Nedvěd was substituted after the goal and with no further goals scored, Lazio won the match 2–1 to win the last ever Cup Winners' Cup.

=== Details ===
19 May 1999
19:45 BST

Mallorca (Spain)	1–2	(Italy) Lazio
Dani 11'	Report	Vieri 7'; Nedvěd 81'

Villa Park, Birmingham
Attendance: 33,021
Referee: Günter Benkö (Austria)

Mallorca	Lazio

GK	13	(Argentina) Carlos Roa
RB	14	(Spain) Javier Olaizola (c)
CB	5	(Spain) Marcelino
CB	4	(Argentina) Gustavo Siviero	(yellow card) 54'
LB	3	(Spain) Miquel Soler
DM	23	(Spain) Vicente Engonga
RM	12	(Cameroon) Lauren
LM	11	(Federal Republic of Yugoslavia) Jovan Stanković
AM	10	(Argentina) Ariel Ibagaza
CF	9	(Spain) Dani
CF	22	(Argentina) Leonardo Biagini		(substituted off) 73'
Substitutes:
GK	1	(Spain) César Gálvez
DF	7	(Spain) Lluís Carreras
DF	20	(Spain) Fernando Niño
MF	15	(Spain) Paco Soler
FW	8	(Spain) Carlitos
FW	21	(Federal Republic of Yugoslavia) Veljko Paunović		(substituted on) 73'
FW	24	(Argentina) Ariel López
Manager:
(Argentina) Héctor Cúper

GK	1	(Italy) Luca Marchegiani	(yellow card) 90+1'
RB	15	(Italy) Giuseppe Pancaro
CB	13	(Italy) Alessandro Nesta (c)
CB	11	(Federal Republic of Yugoslavia) Siniša Mihajlović	(yellow card) 23'
LB	5	(Italy) Giuseppe Favalli
RM	20	(Federal Republic of Yugoslavia) Dejan Stanković		(substituted off) 56'
CM	10	(Italy) Roberto Mancini		(substituted off) 90+1'
CM	25	(Argentina) Matías Almeyda
LM	18	(Czech Republic) Pavel Nedvěd		(substituted off) 84'
CF	9	(Chile) Marcelo Salas
CF	32	(Italy) Christian Vieri	(yellow card) 39'
Substitutes:
GK	22	(Italy) Marco Ballotta
DF	2	(Italy) Paolo Negro
DF	17	(Switzerland) Guerino Gottardi
DF	24	(Portugal) Fernando Couto		(substituted on) 90+1'
MF	7	(Italy) Attilio Lombardo		(substituted on) 84'
MF	21	(Spain) Iván de la Peña
FW	14	(Portugal) Sérgio Conceição		(substituted on) 56'
Manager:
(Sweden) Sven-Göran Eriksson

Man of the Match:
(Italy) Christian Vieri (Lazio)

Match rules

- 90 minutes.
- 30 minutes of extra time if necessary.
- Penalty shoot-out if scores still level.
- Seven named substitutes.
- Maximum of three substitutions.

== Post match ==
Lazio manager, Eriksson, was delighted with the result: "I feel very happy, This is Lazio's first win in Europe. This is also the last Cup Winners' Cup so the trophy is ours forever. No-one can take it away from us. It was a very good game. Mallorca are a very good team but we deserved it. We've only lost one match in Europe in the last two seasons and that was last year's UEFA Cup final against Inter." He went to say that the victory would be a consolation if his team failed to win Serie A the following weekend: "We'll try to beat Parma and see if it's enough for us to be champions of Italy, whatever happens, we've had an extremely good season. We're undefeated in Europe, we won the Italian Super Cup and we're fighting for the league title to the end."

Mallorca manager, Héctor Cúper, was proud of his team despite the loss: "Nothing is consolation when we did not get the victory. We all feel the same way at this moment in time in my team. No words that can describe how we feel. We have a team that is really strong. No-one could imagine how we are feeling at the moment. when you go into a game you go into it with a certain mindset, a clear mind. I can only repeat there are no words to describe now we feel at the moment. We cannot even fathom it. Maybe tomorrow we will understand how we feel. But today I am very proud of my team and how they played."

Lazio's final match in Serie A was against Parma, while Milan faced Perugia. Lazio needed to win and Milan to drop points if they were to win finish the season as champions. Despite victory against Parma courtesy of two goals by Salas, Milan beat Perugia, this meant Milan won Serie A with Lazio second. They qualified for the 1999–2000 UEFA Champions League as a result of their final position. Lazio's victory in the Cup Winners' Cup entitled them to play in the UEFA Super Cup. They faced the winners of the 1998–99 UEFA Champions League, Manchester United, a match they won 1–0.

Mallorca had four matches left to play in La Liga. They won two and lost two to finish in third position behind champions, Barcelona and runners-up, Real Madrid. Their third-place finish meant they would enter the Champions League in the third qualifying round. At the end of the season, Cúper left to become manager of Valencia.
