= 2002–03 RCD Mallorca season =

RCD Mallorca
2002–03 season
- Manager: Gregorio Manzano
- Stadium: Estadio Son Moix
- La Liga: 9th
- Copa del Rey: Winners
- Top goalscorer: Samuel Eto'o (14); Walter Pandiani (14)

During the 2002–03 Spanish football season, RCD Mallorca competed in the La Liga.

== Season summary ==
Mallorca finished the season in 9th position in the La Liga table. In other competitions, Mallorca winner of the Copa del Rey.

Samuel Eto'o and Walter Pandiani was the top scorer for Mallorca with 14 goals in all competitions.

== Squad ==
=== Goalkeepers ===
- (Spain) Alberto Cifuentes Martínez
- (Spain) Leo Franco
- (Spain) Miki Garro

=== Defenders ===
- (Spain) Ángel Pérez
- (Spain) David Cortés
- (Argentina) Federico Lussenhoff
- (Spain) Miguel Ángel Nadal
- (Spain) Fernando Niño
- (Spain) Javier Olaizola
- (Spain) Poli
- (Spain) Miquel Soler
- (Spain) Vicente

=== Midfielders ===
- (Spain) Alejandro Campano
- (Argentina) Ariel Ibagaza
- (Colombia) John Harold Lozano
- (Spain) Marcos
- (Spain) Paco Soler
- (Spain) Raúl Martin
- (Spain) Albert Riera
- (Spain) Julián Robles

=== Attackers ===
- (Argentina) Leonardo Biagini
- (Spain) Carlitos
- (Cameroon) Samuel Eto'o
- (Spain) Alvaro Novo
- (Uruguay) Walter Pandiani
- (Spain) Tuni
- (Argentina) José Oscar Flores

== Competitions ==
=== La Liga ===
==== League table ====
Pos	Team	Pld	W	D	L	GF	GA	GD	Pts	Qualification or relegation
7	Athletic Bilbao	38	15	10	13	63	61	+2	55	
8	Real Betis	38	14	12	12	56	53	+3	54	
9	Mallorca	38	14	10	14	49	56	−7	52	Qualification for the UEFA Cup first round (Note: Mallorca entered UEFA Cup as winners of 2002–03 Copa del Rey)
10	Sevilla	38	13	11	14	38	39	−1	50	
11	Osasuna	38	12	11	15	40	48	−8	47 (Note: OSA 1–0 ATM; ATM 0–1 OSA)	

Source: LFP
Rules for classification: 1st points; 2nd head-to-head points; 3rd head-to-head goal difference; 4th head-to-head away goals scored; 5th goal difference; 6th number of goals scored; 7th Fair-play points

==== Results by round ====
Round	1	2	3	4	5	6	7	8	9	10	11	12	13	14	15	16	17	18	19	20	21	22	23	24	25	26	27	28	29	30	31	32	33	34	35	36	37	38
Ground	H	A	H	A	H	A	H	A	H	A	H	A	H	A	H	A	A	H	A	A	H	A	H	A	H	A	H	A	H	A	H	A	H	A	H	H	A	H
Result	L	L	L	W	W	W	W	W	W	W	D	D	L	L	L	L	W	D	L	L	L	L	D	L	W	D	W	D	D	D	W	W	L	W	L	D	D	W
Position	19	19	20	15	16	13	11	6	5	2	3	5	7	8	8	10	8	8	8	14	14	17	17	18	15	15	11	13	13	14	12	11	11	7	11	11	11	9

Updated to match(es) played on 21 June 2003. Source: Scoreboard
A = Away; H = Home; W = Win; D = Draw; L = Loss
