= 1998–99 FC Barcelona season =

100th season in existence of FC Barcelona

FC Barcelona
1998–99 season
- President: Josep Lluís Núñez
- Head Coach: Louis van Gaal
- Stadium: Camp Nou
- La Liga: 1st
- Copa del Rey: Quarter-finals
- Supercopa de España: Runners-up
- UEFA Champions League: Group stage (3rd)
- Top goalscorer: League: Rivaldo (24); All: Rivaldo (29)
Home colours	Away colours

During the 1998–99 FC Barcelona season, the club once again retained the La Liga title. Barcelona enjoyed a great season with their new signings Ronald de Boer, Patrick Kluivert, Frank de Boer, Mauricio Pellegrino, Boudewijn Zenden and Phillip Cocu. Barcelona had a league tough start in early season but Barcelona later made a remarkable turnaround to secure La Liga in late-May, thanks to Real Madrid's several slips.

Barcelona were eliminated by Valencia in the quarter-final of Copa del Rey.

Following another lackluster performance in the First Group Phase against two European giants Bayern Munich and Manchester United with wins, draws and losses twice respectively and thus prevented Barcelona qualified to UEFA Champions League quarter finals.

== Squad ==
Squad at end of season

Note: Flags indicate national team as defined under FIFA eligibility rules; some limited exceptions apply. Players may hold more than one non-FIFA nationality.

No.	Pos.	Nation	Player
1	GK	POR	Vítor Baía
2	DF	NED	Michael Reiziger
3	DF	ARG	Mauricio Pellegrino
4	MF	ESP	Pep Guardiola (captain)
5	DF	ESP	Abelardo
6	MF	ESP	Óscar
7	MF	POR	Luís Figo
8	MF	ESP	Albert Celades
9	FW	BRA	Sonny Anderson
10	MF	BRA	Giovanni
11	MF	BRA	Rivaldo
12	DF	ESP	Sergi
13	GK	NED	Ruud Hesp
14	MF	NGR	Emmanuel Amunike
15	MF	NED	Phillip Cocu

No.	Pos.	Nation	Player
16	MF	YUG	Dragan Ćirić
17	DF	NED	Winston Bogarde
18	MF	NED	Ronald de Boer
19	FW	NED	Patrick Kluivert
20	DF	ESP	Miguel Ángel Nadal
21	MF	ESP	Luis Enrique
22	DF	NGR	Samuel Okunowo
23	MF	NED	Boudewijn Zenden
24	MF	ESP	Roger
25	DF	NED	Frank de Boer
26	MF	ESP	Xavi Hernández
27	MF	ESP	Luis García
28	GK	ESP	Francesc Arnau
33	DF	ESP	Ibán Cuadrado

=== Transfers ===
In
Pos.	Name	from	Type
FW	Patrick Kluivert	Milan	£8,750,000
DF	Mauricio Pellegrino	Vélez Sarsfield	
MF	Phillip Cocu	PSV	
MF	Boudewijn Zenden	PSV	

Out
Pos.	Name	To	Type
DF	Fernando Couto	Lazio	
MF	Iván de la Peña	Lazio	
DF	Albert Ferrer	Chelsea	
FW	Hristo Stoichkov	CSKA Sofia	
MF	Guillermo Amor	Fiorentina	
FW	Juan Antonio Pizzi	River Plate	
GK	Carles Busquets	Lleida	
FW	Christophe Dugarry	Marseille	
MF	Toni Velamazán	Extremadura	

==== Winter ====
In
Pos.	Name	from	Type
DF	Frank de Boer	Ajax	£22,000,000
MF	Ronald de Boer	Ajax	

Out
Pos.	Name	To	Type
GK	Vítor Baía	Porto	loan

== Friendlies ==
Date	Opponents	H / A	Result F–A	Scorers	Tournament
21 July 1998	AGOVV	A	2–1	Figo 23', Luis Enrique 79'	
23 July 1998	Rohda Raalte	A	13–1	Sonny Anderson 9', Luis Enrique (2) 15', 20', Figo 30', Óscar 38', Gadiaga 46', Seyit (3) 48', 52', 59', Ledezma 54', Luis García (2) 65', 70'	
25 July 1998	GVVV	A	2–1	Sonny Anderson 15', Babangida 84'	
1 August 1998	Wolverhampton Wanderers	A	3–1	Sonny Anderson (2) 10', 61', Mario Rosas 40'	
7 August 1998	Derby County	A	3–1	Luis Enrique 15', Óscar 20', Own goal 75'	
11 August 1998	Hertha BSC	A	1–1	Rivaldo 90'	
14 August 1998	Lleida	A	2–2 (2–3)p	Phillip Cocu 9', Óscar 67'	Ciutat de Lleida Trophy
25 August 1998	Santos	H	2–2 (5–4)p	Rivaldo 39', Figo 41'	Joan Gamper Trophy
2 September 1998	Palamós	A	2–0	Sonny Anderson 16', Giovanni 43'	
10 November 1998	Helsingborgs IF	H	0–2		
16 December 1998	Red Star Belgrade	H	4–1	Phillip Cocu 46', Patrick Kluivert 57', Boudewijn Zenden 70', Óscar 74'	
12 January 1999	Galatasaray	H	2–2	Giovanni 33', Óscar 36'	
27 January 1999	La Liga XI	H	4–0	Dragan Ćirić 57', Roger 70', Winston Bogarde 71', Óscar 86'	
10 March 1999	Johan Cruyff Dream Team	H	2–0	Patrick Kluivert 44', Giovanni 67'	Johan Cruyff Tribute
24 March 1999	Lleida	A	3–4	Nadal 34', Sonny Anderson (2) 39', 89'	Copa Catalunya
6 April 1999	Ajax	A	2–2	Mauricio Pellegrino 56', Sonny Anderson 72'	Johan Cruyff Tribute
28 April 1999	Brazil	H	2–2	Luis Enrique 34', Phillip Cocu 63'	Centenary of FC Barcelona

== Competitions ==
=== Supercopa de España ===
18 August 1998	Mallorca	2–1	Barcelona	Palma de Mallorca
22:00 CET	Dani 57', Stanković 81	Report	Xavi 16'	Stadium: Lluís Sitjar Stadium; Attendance: 12,000; Referee: Antonio López Nieto

22 August 1998	Barcelona	0–1 (1–3 agg.)	Mallorca	Barcelona
22:00 CET			Dani 29'	Stadium: Camp Nou; Attendance: 55,000; Referee: Manuel Díaz Vega

=== La Liga ===
==== League table ====
Pos	Team	Pld	W	D	L	GF	GA	GD	Pts	Qualification or relegation
1	Barcelona (C)	38	24	7	7	87	43	+44	79	Qualification for the Champions League group stage
2	Real Madrid	38	21	5	12	77	62	+15	68	Qualification for the Champions League group stage
3	Mallorca	38	20	6	12	48	31	+17	66	Qualification for the Champions League third qualifying round
4	Valencia	38	19	8	11	63	39	+24	65	Qualification for the Champions League third qualifying round
5	Celta Vigo	38	17	13	8	69	41	+28	64	Qualification for the UEFA Cup first round

Source: LFP
Rules for classification: 1) points; 2) head-to-head points; 3) head-to-head goal difference; 4) head-to-head goals scored; 5) goal difference; 6) number of goals scored.
(C) Champions

==== Results by round ====
Round	1	2	3	4	5	6	7	8	9	10	11	12	13	14	15	16	17	18	19	20	21	22	23	24	25	26	27	28	29	30	31	32	33	34	35	36	37	38
Ground	A	H	A	H	A	H	A	H	A	H	A	H	A	H	A	H	H	A	H	H	A	H	A	H	A	H	A	H	A	H	A	H	A	H	A	A	H	A
Result	D	W	D	D	W	D	W	W	L	W	L	L	L	L	W	W	W	W	W	W	W	W	D	L	W	W	W	W	W	W	D	W	W	D	W	W	W	L
Position	11	6	6	7	3	6	4	3	4	2	3	6	8	10	9	7	5	3	1	1	1	1	1	1	1	1	1	1	1	1	1	1	1	1	1	1	1	1

Source: Competitive Matches
A = Away; H = Home; W = Win; D = Draw; L = Loss

==== Matches ====
30 August 1998 1	Racing Santander	0–0	Barcelona	Santander
		Report

12 September 1998 2	Barcelona	1–0	Extremadura	Barcelona
	Figo 23'	Report		Stadium: Camp Nou

19 September 1998 3	Real Madrid	2–2	Barcelona	Madrid
	Raúl 7' 25'	Report	Kluivert 12'; Anderson 82'	Stadium: Santiago Bernabéu Stadium

26 September 1998 4	Barcelona	2–2	Celta Vigo	Barcelona
	Kluivert 38' 56'	Report	Salgado 42'; Mostovoy 89'	Stadium: Camp Nou

3 October 1998 5	Valencia	1–3	Barcelona	Valencia
	López 15'	Report	Kluivert 56'; Rivaldo 73'; Anderson 89'	Stadium: Mestalla

17 October 1998 6	Barcelona	1–1	Salamanca	Barcelona
	Cocu 52'	Report	Alonso 62'	Stadium: Camp Nou

25 October 1998 7	Espanyol	1–2	Barcelona	Barcelona
	de Lucas 59'	Report	Kluivert 9'; Giovanni 82' (pen.)	Stadium: Estadi Olímpic Lluís Companys

31 October 1998 8	Barcelona	4–1	Real Sociedad	Barcelona
	Rivaldo 33' 61'; Anderson 37' 80'	Report	Kovačević 24'	Stadium: Camp Nou

8 November 1998 9	Real Oviedo	2–1	Barcelona	Oviedo
	Pinto 85'; Pellegrino 89' (o.g.)	Report	Rivaldo 35'	Stadium: Carlos Tartiere

15 November 1998 10	Barcelona	4–1	Tenerife	Barcelona
	Cocu 14' 62'; Rivaldo 84'; Anderson 89'	Report	Makaay 44'	Stadium: Camp Nou

21 November 1998 11	Mallorca	1–0	Barcelona	Palma de Mallorca
	Barjuán 19' (o.g.)	Report		Stadium: Lluís Sitjar Stadium

28 November 1998 12	Barcelona	0–1	Atlético de Madrid	Barcelona
		Report	Jugović 38' (pen.)	Stadium: Camp Nou

5 December 1998 13	Deportivo La Coruña	2–1	Barcelona	La Coruña
	Hadji 75'; Fran 89'	Report	Rivaldo 86' (pen.)	Stadium: Riazor

13 December 1998 14	Barcelona	1–3	Villarreal	Barcelona
	Giovanni 82'	Report	Craioveanu 12' 24'; Gerardo 75'	Stadium: Camp Nou

20 December 1998 15	Real Valladolid	0–1	Barcelona	Valladolid
		Report	Xavi 16'	Stadium: Estadio José Zorrilla

3 January 1999 16	Barcelona	7–1	Alavés	Barcelona
	Figo 19'; Enrique 36' 89'; Rivaldo 57' 66'; Óscar 85' 86'	Report	Pablo 79' (pen.)	Stadium: Camp Nou

9 January 1999 17	Barcelona	4–2	Athletic Bilbao	Barcelona
	Enrique 23'; Cocu 39'; Rivaldo 53' 85'	Report	Urzaiz 51'; Guerrero 74'	Stadium: Camp Nou

17 January 1999 18	Real Betis	0–3	Barcelona	Seville
		Report	Figo 2'; Enrique 33'; Guardiola 84'	Stadium: Estadio Benito Villamarín

24 January 1999 19	Barcelona	3–1	Real Zaragoza	Barcelona
	Cocu 8'; Rivaldo 57' 87'	Report	Milošević 66'	Stadium: Camp Nou

31 January 1999 20	Barcelona	3–2	Racing Santander	Barcelona
	Merino 36' (o.g.) de Boer 44'; Cocu 85'	Report	Víctor 27'; Munitis 48'	Stadium: Camp Nou

7 February 1999 21	Extremadura	1–2	Barcelona	Almendralejo
	Duré 19'	Report	Enrique 28'; Kluivert 83'	Stadium: de la Hera

14 February 1999 22	Barcelona	3–0	Real Madrid	Barcelona
	Enrique 4' 36'; Rivaldo 80'	Report		Stadium: Camp Nou

21 February 1999 23	Celta Vigo	0–0	Barcelona	Vigo
		Report		Stadium: Balaídos

27 February 1999 24	Barcelona	2–4	Valencia	Camp Nou
	Kluivert 29' 77'	Report	Ilie 4'; López 38' 87'; Angulo 82'

7 March 1999 25	Salamanca	1–4	Barcelona	Villares de la Reina
	Cardetti 71'	Report	Figo 8'; Enrique 43'; Kluivert 44'; Anderson 80'	Stadium: Helmántico Stadium

14 March 1999 26	Barcelona	3–0	Espanyol	Barcelona
	Rivaldo 16' 29' (pen.); Kluivert 52'	Report		Stadium: Camp Nou

21 March 1999 27	Real Sociedad	0–2	Barcelona	San Sebastián
		Report	Cocu 29' 87'	Stadium: Anoeta

4 April 1999 28	Barcelona	3–1	Real Oviedo	Barcelona
	Rivaldo 23' 32' (pen.) 86' (pen.)	Report	Valdés 26'	Stadium: Camp Nou

10 April 1999 29	Tenerife	2–3	Barcelona	Santa Cruz de Tenerife
	Pinilla 43'; Makaay 56'	Report	Cocu 17'; Rivaldo 36'; Celades 44'	Stadium: Estadio Heliodoro Rodríguez López

17 April 1999 30	Barcelona	2–1	Mallorca	Barcelona
	de Boer 4'; Kluivert 25'	Report	Biagini 89' (pen.)	Stadium: Camp Nou

25 April 1999 31	Atlético de Madrid	1–1	Barcelona	Madrid
	Valerón 54'	Report	Abelardo 63'	Stadium: Vicente Calderón Stadium

2 May 1999 32	Barcelona	4–0	Deportivo La Coruña	Barcelona
	Kluivert 14'; Figo 39'; Enrique 44'; Rivaldo 78'	Report		Stadium: Camp Nou

9 May 1999 33	Villarreal	2–3	Barcelona	Villarreal
	Alfaro 27'; Moisés 72'	Report	Kluivert 44'; Cocu 56'; Rivaldo 77'	Stadium: Estadio de la Cerámica

15 May 1999 34	Barcelona	1–1	Real Valladolid	Barcelona
	Enrique 62'	Report	Lozano 81'	Stadium: Camp Nou

22 May 1999 35	Alavés	1–4	Barcelona	Vitoria-Gasteiz
	Salinas 76'	Report	Cocu 40'; Kluivert 49'; Figo 67'; Enrique 88'	Stadium: Mendizorrotza

29 May 1999 36	Athletic Bilbao	1–3	Barcelona	Bilbao
	Ferreira 49'	Report	Kluivert 6'; Rivaldo 74' (pen.) 89'	Stadium: San Mamés

13 June 1999 37	Barcelona	4–1	Real Betis	Barcelona
	Cocu 23'; Rivaldo 26' (pen.); Figo 30'; Celades 76'	Report	Oli 81'	Stadium: Camp Nou

20 June 1999 38	Real Zaragoza	2–0	Barcelona	Zaragoza
	Milošević 6' 76'	Report		Stadium: La Romareda

=== UEFA Champions League ===
==== Group D ====
Team	Pld	W	D	L	GF	GA	GD	Pts	BAY	MUN	BAR	BRO
(Germany) Bayern Munich	6	3	2	1	9	6	+3	11	—	2–2	1–0	2–0
(England) Manchester United	6	2	4	0	20	11	+9	10	1–1	—	3–3	5–0
(Spain) Barcelona	6	2	2	2	11	9	+2	8	1–2	3–3	—	2–0
(Denmark) Brøndby	6	1	0	5	4	18	−14	3	2–1	2–6	0–2	—

Legend: Blue = home team win; Yellow = draw; Red = away team win.

16 September 1998	Manchester United (England)	3–3	(Spain) Barcelona	Old Trafford, Manchester
20:45 (19:45 UTC+1)	Giggs 16'; Scholes 24'; Beckham 63'	Report	Anderson 47'; Giovanni 59' (pen.); Luis Enrique 70' (pen.)	Attendance: 53,601; Referee: Stefano Braschi (Italy)

30 September 1998	Barcelona (Spain)	2–0	(Denmark) Brøndby	Camp Nou, Barcelona
20:45 (20:45 UTC+2)	Anderson 44', 85'	Report		Attendance: 55,000; Referee: Gerd Grabher (Austria)

21 October 1998	Bayern Munich (Germany)	1–0	(Spain) Barcelona	Olympiastadion, Munich
20:45 (20:45 UTC+2)	Effenberg 45'	Report		Attendance: 56,000; Referee: Anders Frisk (Sweden)

4 November 1998	Barcelona (Spain)	1–2	(Germany) Bayern Munich	Camp Nou, Barcelona
20:45 (20:45 UTC+1)	Giovanni 29' (pen.)	Report	Zickler 48'; Salihamidžić 87'	Attendance: 100,000; Referee: Pierluigi Collina (Italy)

25 November 1998	Barcelona (Spain)	3–3	(England) Manchester United	Camp Nou, Barcelona
20:45 (20:45 UTC+1)	Anderson 1'; Rivaldo 57', 73'	Report	Yorke 25', 68'; Cole 53'	Attendance: 54,213; Referee: Günter Benkö (Austria)

9 December 1998	Brøndby (Denmark)	0–2	(Spain) Barcelona	Parken Stadium, Copenhagen
20:45 (20:45 UTC+1)		Report	Figo 6'; Rivaldo 36'	Attendance: 40,892; Referee: Nikolai Levnikov (Russia)

=== Copa del Rey ===
==== Eightfinals ====
20 January 1999	Benidorm	0–1	Barcelona
			de Boer 88'

4 February 1999	Barcelona	3–0	Benidorm
	de Boer 21'; Barjuán 38'; Giovanni 77'

==== Quarterfinals ====
17 February 1999	Barcelona	2–3	Valencia	Barcelona
	Kluivert 47'; Rivaldo 60'	Report	Piojo Lopez 51'; Piojo Lopez 56'; Mendieta 80'	Stadium: Camp Nou

23 February 1999	Valencia	4–3	Barcelona	Valencia
	Piojo Lopez 23'; Piojo Lopez 35'; Angulo 42'; Mendieta 69'	Report	Rivaldo 57'; Óscar 63' de Boer 81'	Stadium: Estadio Mestalla

== Statistics ==
=== Players statistics ===
No.	Pos	Nat	Player	Total		La Liga		Copa del Rey		UEFA Champions League	
No.	Pos	Nat	Player	Apps	Goals	Apps	Goals	Apps	Goals	Apps	Goals
13	GK	(Netherlands) NED	Hesp	46	-58	37	-42	3	-7	6	-9
2	DF	(Netherlands) NED	Reiziger	31	0	24+2	0	0	0	4+1	0
5	DF	(Spain) ESP	Abelardo	37	1	28+2	1	3	0	4	0
25	DF	(Netherlands) NED	Frank de Boer	23	4	19	2	4	2	0	0
12	DF	(Spain) ESP	Sergi	43	1	34+1	0	3	1	5	0
7	MF	(Portugal) POR	Figo	44	8	34	7	4	0	6	1
15	MF	(Netherlands) NED	Cocu	45	12	36	12	3+1	0	5	0
4	MF	(Spain) ESP	Guardiola	26	1	21+1	1	3	0	1	0
21	MF	(Spain) ESP	Luis Enrique	32	12	26	11	3	0	3	1
19	FW	(Netherlands) NED	Kluivert	38	15	35	14	3	1	0	0
11	FW	(Brazil) BRA	Rivaldo	46	29	37	24	3	2	6	3
28	GK	(Spain) ESP	Arnau	1	0	0	0	1	0	0	0
3	DF	(Argentina) ARG	Pellegrino	25	0	16+7	0	2	0	0	0
26	MF	(Spain) ESP	Xavi	25	1	16+1	1	1+1	0	4+2	0
8	MF	(Spain) ESP	Celades	19	2	11+5	2	0	0	3	0
18	MF	(Netherlands) NED	Ronald de Boer	17	1	11+2	0	3+1	1	0	0
10	MF	(Brazil) BRA	Giovanni	21	5	9+5	2	1	1	5+1	2
23	MF	(Netherlands) NED	Zenden	30	0	8+17	0	1	0	2+2	0
22	DF	(Nigeria) NGR	Okunowo	19	0	8+6	0	0	0	5	0
9	FW	(Brazil) BRA	Anderson	31	10	4+20	6	0+1	0	6	4
6	MF	(Spain) ESP	Óscar	10	3	1+5	2	1+2	1	0+1	0
24	MF	(Spain) ESP	Roger	9	0	1+5	0	1	0	1+1	0
20	DF	(Spain) ESP	Nadal	3	0	1+1	0	0+1	0	0	0
16	MF	(Federal Republic of Yugoslavia) YUG	Ciric	5	0	0+5	0	0	0	0	0
17	DF	(Netherlands) NED	Bogarde	2	0	0+1	0	1	0	0	0
27	MF	(Spain) ESP	Luis García	0	0	0	0	0	0	0	0
33	DF	(Spain) ESP	Cuadrado	1	0	0	0	0	0	0+1	0
1	GK	(Portugal) POR	Baia	0	0	0	0	0	0	0	0
14	MF	(Nigeria) NGR	Amunike	0	0	0	0	0	0	0	0
