= 1998 Supercopa de España =

Mallorca	Barcelona
3	1
- on aggregate

First leg
Mallorca	Barcelona
2	1
- Date: 18 August 1998
- Venue: Lluís Sitjar, Palma de Mallorca
- Referee: Antonio Jesús López Nieto
- Attendance: 12,000

Second leg
Barcelona	Mallorca
0	1
- Date: 22 August 1998
- Venue: Camp Nou, Barcelona
- Referee: Manuel Díaz Vega
- Attendance: 55,000

The 1998 Supercopa de España was a Spanish football competition, played over two legs on 18 August and 22 August 1998. It was contested by Mallorca, who were Spanish Cup runners-up in 1997–98, and Barcelona, who won the 1997–98 Spanish League as well as the 1997–98 Spanish Cup.

== Match details ==
=== First leg ===
18 August 1998
22:00 CET

Mallorca	2–1	Barcelona
Dani 57'; Stanković 81'		Xavi 16'

Lluís Sitjar, Palma de Mallorca
Attendance: 12,000
Referee: López Nieto

Mallorca	Barcelona

GK	13	(Argentina) Carlos Roa
RB	12	(Cameroon) Lauren
CB	5	(Spain) Marcelino
CB	4	(Argentina) Gustavo Siviero
LB	3	(Spain) Miquel Soler
RM	10	(Argentina) Ariel Ibagaza
CM	15	(Spain) Paco Soler (c)	(yellow card) 1'
CM	23	(Spain) Vicente Engonga
LM	11	(Federal Republic of Yugoslavia) Jovan Stanković
CF	9	(Spain) Dani		(substituted off) 87'
CF	24	(Argentina) Ariel López		(substituted off) 76'
Substitutes:
FW	22	(Argentina) Leonardo Biagini		(substituted in) 76'
DF	7	(Spain) Lluís Carreras		(substituted in) 87'
Manager:
(Argentina) Héctor Cúper

GK	13	(Netherlands) Ruud Hesp
RB	2	(Netherlands) Michael Reiziger
CB	20	(Spain) Miguel Ángel Nadal (c)
CB	22	(Nigeria) Samuel Okunowo	(yellow card) 62'	(substituted off) 67'
LB	24	(Spain) Roger	(yellow card) 24'	(substituted off) 46'
CM	26	(Spain) Xavi
CM	15	(Netherlands) Phillip Cocu
AM	10	(Brazil) Giovanni
RF	21	(Spain) Luis Enrique	(yellow card) 17'
CF	11	(Brazil) Rivaldo
LF	23	(Netherlands) Boudewijn Zenden	(yellow card) 75'	(substituted off) 78'
Substitutes:
DF	12	(Spain) Sergi		(substituted in) 46'
DF	5	(Spain) Abelardo		(substituted in) 67'
FW	30	(Spain) Luis García		(substituted in) 78'
Manager:
(Netherlands) Louis van Gaal

=== Second leg ===
22 August 1998
22:00 CET

Barcelona	0–1	Mallorca
		Dani 29'

Camp Nou, Barcelona
Attendance: 55,000
Referee: Díaz Vega

Barcelona	Mallorca

GK	13	(Netherlands) Ruud Hesp
RB	2	(Netherlands) Michael Reiziger	(yellow card) 45'
CB	20	(Spain) Miguel Ángel Nadal
CB	22	(Nigeria) Samuel Okunowo		(substituted off) 61'
LB	24	(Spain) Roger		(substituted off) 46'
CM	21	(Spain) Luis Enrique
CM	15	(Netherlands) Phillip Cocu
AM	10	(Brazil) Giovanni	(yellow card) 81'
RF	7	(Portugal) Luís Figo (c)
CF	11	(Brazil) Rivaldo
LF	23	(Netherlands) Boudewijn Zenden		(substituted off) 46'
Substitutes:
DF	12	(Spain) Sergi		(substituted in) 46'
MF	6	(Spain) Óscar		(substituted in) 46'
MF	8	(Spain) Albert Celades	(yellow card) 77'	(substituted in) 61'
Manager:
(Netherlands) Louis van Gaal

GK	13	(Argentina) Carlos Roa	(yellow card) 34'
RB	12	(Cameroon) Lauren	(yellow card) 34'
CB	5	(Spain) Marcelino
CB	4	(Argentina) Gustavo Siviero
LB	3	(Spain) Miquel Soler
RM	10	(Argentina) Ariel Ibagaza	(yellow card) 18'	(substituted off) 67'
CM	15	(Spain) Paco Soler (c)	(yellow card) 42'
CM	23	(Spain) Vicente Engonga
LM	11	(Federal Republic of Yugoslavia) Jovan Stanković
CF	9	(Spain) Dani		(substituted off) 87'
CF	24	(Argentina) Ariel López		(substituted off) 57'
Substitutes:
FW	22	(Argentina) Leonardo Biagini		(substituted in) 57'
MF	16	(Spain) Óscar Arpón		(substituted in) 67'
DF	7	(Spain) Lluís Carreras		(substituted in) 87'
Manager:
(Argentina) Héctor Cúper

== See also ==
- 1998–99 La Liga
- 1998–99 Copa del Rey
- 1998–99 FC Barcelona season
- 1998–99 RCD Mallorca season
