= Angel Perez =

Angel or Ángel Pérez may refer to:

- Angel Pérez (canoeist) (born 1971), Cuban born naturalised American canoer
- Ángel Pérez (footballer, born 1981), Spanish football (soccer) player
- Ángel Pérez (footballer, born 2002), Spanish football (soccer) player
- Ángel Pérez (volleyball) (born 1982), Puerto Rican volleyball player
- Angel Pérez Otero (born 1970), Puerto Rican politician
- Angel Perez, a fiction character in the book series The Genesis of Shannara by Terry Brooks
