= Lauren (Cameroonian footballer) =

Cameroonian footballer (born 1977)

- Lauren playing in a friendly in 2017

Personal information
- Full name: Laureano Bisan-Etame Mayer
- Date of birth: 19 January 1977 (age 49)
- Place of birth: Kribi, Cameroon
- Height: 1.80 m (5 ft 11 in)
- Positions: Right-back; right midfielder

Senior career*
Years	Team	Apps	(Gls)
1995–1996	Utrera	30	(5)
1996–1997	Sevilla B	17	(3)
1997–1998	Levante	34	(6)
1998–2000	Mallorca	63	(4)
2000–2007	Arsenal	159	(7)
2007–2009	Portsmouth	25	(0)
2010	Córdoba	5	(0)
Total		333	(25)

International career
2000	Cameroon U23	6	(3)
1997–2002	Cameroon	24	(1)
Medal record
Representing Cameroon
Africa Cup of Nations
Winner	2000 Ghana-Nigeria
Winner	2002 Mali
Olympics
Gold medal – first place	2000 Sydney
- * Club domestic league appearances and goals

Laureano Bisan-Etame Mayer (born 19 January 1977), commonly known as Lauren, is a Cameroonian former footballer who played as a right-back after becoming a right midfielder.

Born in Cameroon to refugees from Equatorial Guinea, he moved to Spain at a young age where he was raised. He started his career with Sevilla in Spain. He played for Arsenal between 2000 and 2007 where he won several trophies and is known as one of 'The Invincibles', a title given to the Arsenal squad that was undefeated during the 2003–04 Premier League season.

He also won an Olympic Gold Medal at the 2000 Sydney Olympics and two Africa Cup of Nations titles in 2000 and 2002 with Cameroon. He holds dual Cameroonian-Spanish nationality.

== Club career ==
=== Early career ===
Lauren was born in Kribi, Cameroon to parents from Equatorial Guinea who had fled political persecution during the dictatorship of Francisco Macías Nguema. At a young age his family moved to Seville, Spain, where he was raised. He started his career in Spain playing for Utrera on loan from Sevilla. He then played for Sevilla B, Levante, and Mallorca. He played with Mallorca in the 1999 UEFA Cup Winners' Cup final defeat against Lazio, and helped Mallorca qualify for the Champions League by coming 3rd in the 1998–99 La Liga season. After the end of 1999–2000 La Liga season, Lauren received offers from numerous clubs including Real Madrid and Roma but ended up moving to Arsenal in England.

=== Arsenal ===
After a transfer to Italian club Roma fell through, he moved to English club Arsenal in 2000. He made his Arsenal debut as a substitute against Sunderland on 19 August 2000 and scored his first goal for the club just two days later against Liverpool. However his first season was blighted by injuries. Although at first Lauren was unable to gain a regular place in the Arsenal side, he eventually ended up becoming the club's first-choice right-back, replacing Lee Dixon and leapfrogging Oleh Luzhnyi in the process. By the time Arsenal had won the Double in 2001–02, Lauren was an integral part of the Arsenal defence. Lauren missed part of the season as he went off to play in the 2002 Africa Cup of Nations, but returned to feature for Arsenal from February onwards. He scored the winning goal, a penalty, against rivals Tottenham Hotspur as Arsenal closed in on the title.

In 2002–03, Lauren suffered a calf injury and again missed part of the season, but nevertheless recovered in time and won an FA Cup medal that season, as Arsenal beat Southampton 1–0.

Lauren was a consistent member of the Arsenal first team during 2003–04 and a became known as one of the 'Invincibles' after the club went the whole season unbeaten. Lauren made his 150th appearance for Arsenal during the record-breaking run and Arsenal won the Premier League title, giving Lauren his second League winners' medal. His season was, however, slightly marred by his verbal abuse towards Ruud van Nistelrooy after the latter had missed a penalty late on in a draw between Arsenal and Manchester United at Old Trafford. Lauren was banned by the Football Association for four matches and fined £40,000.

Lauren won a third FA Cup winners' medal in 2005, as Arsenal beat Manchester United on penalties after a 0–0 draw in the final; Lauren scored the first of Arsenal's spot-kicks. However, during 2005–06, Lauren suffered a knee injury against Wigan Athletic in a League Cup semi-final match on 24 January 2006. He spent nearly a year out of the game as a result, and it was not until 19 December that Lauren was included in a playing squad, for Arsenal's match against Liverpool in the League Cup quarter-finals; this match was later postponed due to heavy fog. Lauren was not called up for Arsenal again.

During his absence, Lauren's position had been covered by, amongst others, Emmanuel Eboué and Justin Hoyte, leading to media speculation that Lauren would leave Arsenal for West Ham United. On 12 January 2007, Wenger confirmed Arsenal would allow Lauren to leave, if he chose to do so. On 18 January 2007, Lauren joined Portsmouth on a 2 1/2-year contract for an undisclosed fee.

=== Portsmouth ===
On 18 January 2007, Lauren completed a transfer to Portsmouth on a 2 1/2-year contract. On 22 January, Harry Redknapp announced the transfer fee was £500,000.

Lauren made his debut on 20 January 2007 against Charlton Athletic and was a regular at right-back for the remainder of the 2006–07 season. In the 2007–08 season, he dropped to second-choice right-back due to Glen Johnson's impressive form. However, Lauren found first team opportunities due to his versatility and filled in at left-back on many occasions and played regularly on the right of midfield during January 2008 while John Utaka was away at the African Cup of Nations. Lauren was part of Portsmouth's 2007–08 FA Cup-winning team. Despite not making the squad for the final he appeared in the earlier rounds. In June 2009, his contract ended and he was released from the club having made just one appearance all season, as a substitute in the 2008 FA Community Shield.

=== Córdoba ===
On 15 March 2010, Córdoba announced that they had signed Lauren as a free agent. He made his league debut as a substitute for Arteaga on 3 April 2010 in a 0–0 away draw against Huesca. Lauren retired at the end of the season.

== International career ==
Lauren chose to represent Cameroon, the nation of his birth, despite saying he feels Spanish. He made the decision following an invitation from former Cameroonian goalkeeper Thomas N'Kono who had found out that Lauren was born in Cameroon. Lauren said that "went there knowing nothing of Cameroon and not knowing the language." While on international duty, he would roommate with Samuel Eto'o who also spoke Spanish.

Lauren made his senior international debut for Cameroon in 1998. With Cameroon he won a gold medal at the 2000 Sydney Olympics, playing six matches and scoring three goals. With the senior team, he won the 2000 African Cup of Nations. This success was repeated with victory at the 2002 Africa Cup of Nations; Cameroon beat Senegal on penalties after a 0–0 draw. Lauren scored in the penalty shootout. He was also part of the Cameroon squad at the 1998 World Cup in France and the 2002 World Cup in Japan and South Korea. Lauren played a total of 24 matches for the senior team, scoring two goals. Lauren retired from international football at the age of 25 in 2002.

== Arsenal legend ==
Following the success he enjoyed at Arsenal, the north London outfit regard Lauren, who was a mainstay of the Invincibles side, as a club legend. He is a regular visitor to the Emirates Stadium and has lined up for the Arsenal Legends in charity matches organised by the club's foundation, such as the double-header against Real Madrid Legends played at the Emirates and the Santiago Bernabéu in the summer of 2018.

== Arsenal ambassador ==
Thanks to his career achievements at Arsenal and within the African game, which include two Africa Cup of Nations crowns and an Olympic Gold with Cameroon, Lauren currently serves as an Arsenal ambassador for the African continent, a role which features activities involving football and education, as well as attending gatherings with the club's supporters. Lauren considers this position to be a real honour as he sees it as a means of helping the African people, whilst repaying some of the support he received during his playing days. One of the countries Lauren has visited is Rwanda, where he took part in children's football and educational clinics, whilst he also acted as a club representative at official events with local authorities and explored the country's most iconic landmarks whilst flying the flag for Arsenal.

Lauren's role as an Arsenal ambassador has also seen him travel to other global destinations, including Singapore, where he was again involved in football clinics and represented the club at various events.

== FIFA technical expert ==
Lauren became a technical expert of FIFA to develop football talents; he did this with an aim of raising the competitive levels of African football globally. Lauren played at the top level in Arsenal and the Cameroon national team.

== TV commentator ==
Lauren is a well-respected voice of authority when it comes to match broadcasts. He regularly features on LaLiga TV's English-language Viva LaLiga show, which reviews all of the latest action from the Spanish top flight. Meanwhile, he has also worked as a studio pundit for GOL TV's coverage of major Arsenal matches, such as the 2018/19 Europa League final against Chelsea. He has also made media appearances for leading broadcasters, including Sky Sports, where he has featured on Guillem Balagué's Revista de La Liga show, and BBC Sport. He was part of ITV and Eurosport broadcasting teams for the 2012 and 2017 editions of the Africa Cup of Nations.

== Personal life ==
He is also an avid boxer and enjoys sparring in his spare time. He lives in Seville, and has two children.

== Career statistics ==
=== Club ===
Appearances and goals by club, season and competition
Club	Season	League			Cup		League Cup		Total	
Club	Season	Division	Apps	Goals	Apps	Goals	Apps	Goals	Apps	Goals
Utrera	1995–96	Segunda División B	30	5	0	0	0	0	30	5
Sevilla B	1996–97	Segunda División B	17	3	0	0	0	0	17	3
Levante	1997–98	Segunda División	34	6	0	0	0	0	34	6
Mallorca	1998–99	La Liga	33	1	0	0	9	0	42	1
Mallorca	1999–2000	La Liga	30	3	0	0	8	1	38	4
Mallorca	Total		63	4	0	0	17	1	80	5
Arsenal	2000–01	Premier League	18	2	4	0	11	1	33	3
Arsenal	2001–02	Premier League	27	2	3	0	11	0	41	2
Arsenal	2002–03	Premier League	27	2	8	2	10	0	45	4
Arsenal	2003–04	Premier League	32	0	7	0	8	0	47	0
Arsenal	2004–05	Premier League	33	1	5	0	7	1	45	2
Arsenal	2005–06	Premier League	22	0	3	0	6	0	31	0
Arsenal	Total		159	7	30	2	53	2	242	11
Portsmouth	2006–07	Premier League	10	0	1	0	0	0	11	0
Portsmouth	2007–08	Premier League	15	0	2	0	0	0	17	0
Portsmouth	2008–09	Premier League	0	0	0	0	0	0	0	0
Portsmouth	Total		25	0	3	0	0	0	28	0
Córdoba	2009–10	Segunda División	5	0	0	0	0	0	5	0
Career total			333	25	33	2	70	3	436	30

=== International ===
Appearances and goals by national team and year
National team	Year	Apps	Goals
Cameroon	1997	1	0
Cameroon	1998	1	0
Cameroon	1999	2	0
Cameroon	2000	6	0
Cameroon	2001	4	1
Cameroon	2002	10	0
Cameroon	Total	24	1

Scores and results list Cameroon's goal tally first, score column indicates score after each Lauren goal.

List of international goals scored by Lauren
No.	Date	Venue	Opponent	Score	Result	Competition
1.	22 April 2001	Stade Ahmadou Ahidjo, Yaoundé, Cameroon	Libya	1–0	1–0	2002 FIFA World Cup qualifier

== Honours ==
Mallorca

- Supercopa de España: 1998

Arsenal

- Premier League: 2001–02, 2003–04
- FA Cup: 2001–02, 2002–03, 2004–05
- FA Community Shield: 2002, 2004

Portsmouth

- FA Cup: 2007–08

Cameroon

- African Cup of Nations: 2000, 2002

Cameroon U-23

- Olympic Gold Medal: 2000

Individual

- African Nations Cup Player of the Tournament: 2000
- African Nations Cup Team of the Tournament: 2000
- PFA Team of the Year: 2003–04 Premier League
