= Marcelino Elena =

Spanish footballer (born 1971)

Marcelino
Personal information
- Full name: Marcelino Elena Sierra
- Date of birth: 26 September 1971 (age 55)
- Place of birth: Gijón, Spain
- Height: 1.88 m (6 ft 2 in)
- Position: Centre-back

Youth career
- Sporting Gijón

Senior career*
Years	Team	Apps	(Gls)
1990–1994	Sporting Gijón B	115	(5)
1994–1995	Sporting Gijón	14	(0)
1996–1999	Mallorca	122	(13)
1999–2003	Newcastle United	17	(0)
2003–2004	Poli Ejido	46	(0)
Total		314	(18)

International career
1998–1999	Spain	5	(0)
- * Club domestic league appearances and goals

Marcelino Elena Sierra (born 26 September 1971), known simply as Marcelino, is a Spanish former professional footballer who played as a central defender.

== Club career ==
=== Sporting and Mallorca ===
Marcelino was born in Gijón, Asturias, and began his career at local club Sporting de Gijón, where he appeared sporadically with the first team over three seasons before earning a move to Mallorca in January 1996. There, he was instrumental in a promotion to La Liga, forming a formidable partnership with Iván Campo in 1997–98 as they finished fifth.

In the following season, the Balearic Islands side finished third in the league and lost the UEFA Cup Winners' Cup final to Lazio, with Marcelino featuring the full 90 minutes in the 2–1 defeat.

=== Newcastle United ===
In 1999, Marcelino transferred to Newcastle United for £5.8 million after impressing with Mallorca in Spain and Europe. A lot was expected of him at his new team, but he appeared only 20 times (all competitions) for the club in the first year and a half, being placed with the reserve team for the rest of his spell and finally reaching an agreement to leave in January 2003, having not featured for the main squad since 11 February 2001 against Charlton Athletic.

Marcelino also suffered several different injuries during his time with the Magpies, which hampered his career there. Scans on the affected areas were occasionally declared to be inconclusive, the most serious of his injuries being a snapped finger tendon which prevented him from playing for two months.

=== Later years ===
After one and a half seasons in Segunda División with Polideportivo Ejido, Marcelino retired. He subsequently spent two years as Everton's Spanish scout, and also worked as a football commentator for RTVE's Premier League matches.

Marcelino later worked as a football agent.

== International career ==
Marcelino earned five caps for Spain over a seven-month period, the first coming against Italy in Salerno on 18 November 1998. He would play his last international in an UEFA Euro 2000 qualifier rout of San Marino (9–0 home win, 90 minutes played).

== Honours ==
Mallorca

- Supercopa de España: 1998
- Copa del Rey runner-up: 1997–98
- UEFA Cup Winners' Cup runner-up: 1998–99
