= Fernando Niño (footballer, born 1974) =

Spanish footballer

Personal information
- Full name: Fernando Niño Bejarano
- Date of birth: 16 September 1974 (age 52)
- Place of birth: Rota, Spain
- Height: 1.85 m (6 ft 1 in)
- Position: Centre-back

Senior career*
Years	Team	Apps	(Gls)
1993–1996	Rota		
1996–1998	Xerez	69	(5)
1998–2005	Mallorca	149	(2)
2006–2009	Elche	79	(5)
Total		297	(12)
- * Club domestic league appearances and goals

Fernando Niño Bejarano (born 16 September 1974) is a Spanish former professional footballer who played as a central defender.

== Club career ==
Niño was born in Rota, Andalusia. After beginning professionally with lowly hometown side CD Rota, he moved to neighbouring Xerez CD for the 1996–97 season, achieving promotion to the Segunda División in his first year but being immediately relegated.

However, Niño's individual performances caught the attention of RCD Mallorca in La Liga and, however mainly registered with the Balearic Islands club's reserves, he finished his first year with 21 first-team appearances.

Subsequently, Niño became an undisputed starter, partnering Spain international Miguel Ángel Nadal for six full seasons. On 29 January 2003, he was one of three players on target for the hosts in a 4–0 home win against Real Madrid in the quarter-finals of the Copa del Rey (5–1 on aggregate), which ended in conquest.

In January 2006, after a serious injury had cut his 2004–05 campaign short, Niño left the team and joined second-tier Elche CF. His physical problems were recurrent in 2008–09, as he was forced to miss 18 league games. He retired from football with immediate effect at the season's end, aged 34, amassing professional totals of 264 matches and nine goals.

== Personal life ==
Niño's son, also named Fernando, is also a footballer.

== Honours ==
Mallorca

- Copa del Rey: 2002–03
- Supercopa de España: 1998
- UEFA Cup Winners' Cup runner-up: 1998–99
