= Veljko Paunović =

Serbian footballer and manager (born 1977)

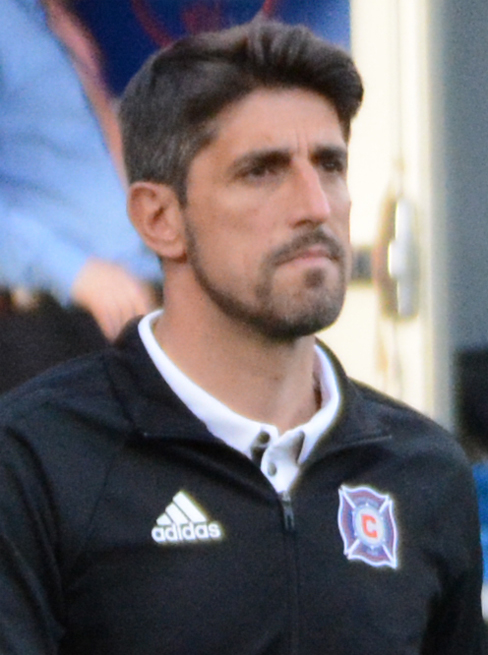
- Paunović with Chicago Fire in 2017

Personal information
- Full name: Veljko Paunović
- Date of birth: 21 August 1977 (age 49)
- Place of birth: Strumica, SFR Yugoslavia
- Height: 1.84 m (6 ft 0 in)
- Positions: Attacking midfielder; striker

Team information
- Current team: Serbia (manager)

Youth career
- 1983–1994: Partizan

Senior career*
Years	Team	Apps	(Gls)
1994–1995	Partizan	13	(1)
1995–2002	Atlético Madrid	52	(9)
1995–1996	→ Marbella (loan)	20	(2)
1996–1998	Atlético Madrid B	22	(11)
1998–1999	→ Mallorca (loan)	24	(5)
2001	→ Oviedo (loan)	22	(4)
2001–2002	→ Mallorca (loan)	33	(3)
2002–2003	Tenerife	38	(18)
2003–2005	Atlético Madrid	35	(6)
2005	Hannover 96	6	(0)
2005–2007	Getafe	44	(10)
2007	Rubin Kazan	16	(1)
2008	Almería	7	(2)
2008	Partizan	9	(1)
2011	Philadelphia Union	17	(3)
Total		358	(76)

International career
2002–2004	Serbia and Montenegro	2	(1)

Managerial career
- 2012–2014: Serbia U18
- 2013–2014: Serbia U19
- 2014–2015: Serbia U20
- 2015–2019: Chicago Fire
- 2020–2022: Reading
- 2022–2023: Guadalajara
- 2024–2025: Tigres UANL
- 2025: Oviedo
- 2025–: Serbia
Medal record
Men's football
Representing Serbia (as manager)
FIFA U-20 World Cup
Winner	2015
- * Club domestic league appearances and goals

Veljko Paunović (Serbian Cyrillic: Вељко Пауновић, pronounced [ʋěːʎko paǔ:noʋitɕ]; born 21 August 1977) is a Serbian football manager and former player. He is the head coach of the Serbia national team.

A versatile attacking unit, he could operate as an attacking midfielder or a striker, and spent most of his professional career in Spain where he represented eight clubs, amassing La Liga totals of 212 matches and 38 goals over 11 seasons and having several spells with Atlético Madrid. Other than in his own country, he also played in Germany, Russia and the United States.

Paunović began working as a manager in 2012, starting with Serbia's youth teams and later being in charge of Chicago Fire, Reading, Guadalajara, Tigres UANL and Oviedo. In October 2025, he was appointed at the Serbia senior side.

== Club career ==
Born in Strumica, Socialist Republic of Macedonia, Socialist Federal Republic of Yugoslavia, Paunović made his professional debut at 17 with Partizan. The following summer he moved to Spain, where he would stay for most of the following decade playing for a host of clubs, starting in the 1995–96 season with modest Marbella and reaching the 1998–99 UEFA Cup Winners' Cup final with Mallorca (with whom he scored five league goals in that campaign, to help the Balearic Islands team finish third), as well as having three separate stints with Atlético Madrid.

Paunović had his best year in 2002–03 with Tenerife in the Segunda División, netting 18 times from 38 appearances although the insular side could only rank eighth. After a return to Atlético and a brief stay in Germany with Hannover 96, he joined Getafe for 2005–06's top flight, enjoying his finest season in La Liga by scoring ten goals in 30 league matches to help the Madrid outskirts club to the ninth place. Due to the years spent in the country, he received a Spanish passport in 2006.

Paunović was signed by Russian Premier League's Rubin Kazan in March 2007, after falling out of favour with Getafe coach Bernd Schuster. The following year, he agreed a two-and-a-half-year deal with Almería in January. His debut was a sour one, playing 20 minutes off the bench against Racing de Santander in a 1–0 away defeat, while also receiving two yellow cards in one minute (with the consequent dismissal). He would score on two occasions towards the season's end, in a 4–2 away loss to former team Getafe and in the last matchday, a 3–1 victory at Espanyol.

On 12 July 2008, Paunović signed a two-year deal with his former club Partizan. On 13 August, he scored in a 2–2 draw with Turkey's Fenerbahçe in the third qualifying round of the UEFA Champions League. Before the end of the year, however, he announced his decision to retire from the game.

On 29 June 2009, Paunović went on trial with the New York Red Bulls, but eventually turned down the one-year contract offer. In June 2011, after nearly three years out of football, the 33-year-old signed a deal with another American club, Philadelphia Union, after a trial stint. He scored his first goal with his new team late in the month, in a 3–2 win over Chivas USA.

Paunović officially announced his retirement for the second time on 19 January 2012.

== International career ==
Paunović made his debut for Serbia and Montenegro in a 2–1 friendly win over Mexico, on 13 February 2002. His only other cap came two years later against Northern Ireland, another exhibition match, and he scored in the 1–1 draw in Belfast.

== Coaching career ==
=== Serbia youths ===
Paunović earned a UEFA Pro coaching licence and a sporting director degree from the Royal Spanish Football Federation. For nine months, he was a UEFA Champions League analyst for RTVE in Spain.

Paunović began working as a manager with the Serbia national team, being in charge of their under-18, under-19 and under-20 sides. While with the latter, he won the 2015 FIFA World Cup.

=== Chicago Fire ===
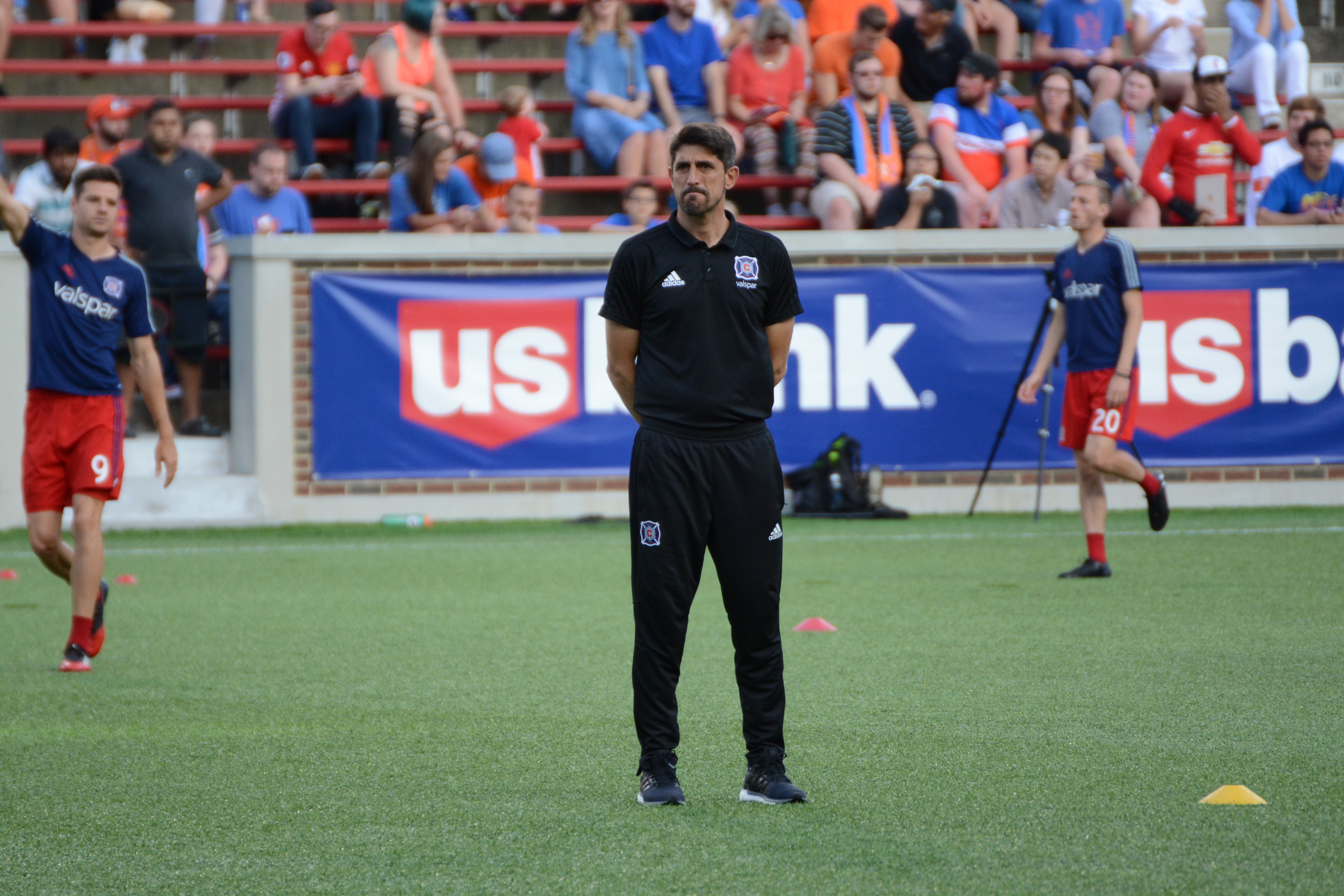
Paunović at a U.S. Open Cup match away to Cincinnati in 2017

On 24 November 2015, Paunović was appointed head coach of Chicago Fire in Major League Soccer. He led the team to the playoffs in 2017, which happened for the first time in five years. In the same year, he coached in the All-Star Game against Real Madrid.

Paunović also reached the semi-finals of the U.S. Open Cup in 2016 and 2018. He and the Fire parted ways on 13 November 2019.

=== Reading ===
Paunović replaced Mark Bowen as manager of Reading on 29 August 2020. On his EFL Championship debut on 12 September, the team won 2–0 at Derby County; he ended September as the division's Manager of the Month for winning all three games. They missed out on a playoff place with two games remaining, after a 2–2 draw against Swansea City at the Madejski Stadium.

In November 2021, during Paunović's second season, the team received a six-point deduction for breaching profitability and sustainability rules across the previous three seasons. The following January, the Royals were knocked out of the FA Cup in the third round by National League North side Kidderminster Harriers.

Following a 3–2 away victory over Preston North End on 19 February 2022, Reading announced that Paunović had left his role by mutual consent.

=== Guadalajara ===
On 31 October 2022, Paunović was named manager at Liga MX club Guadalajara. He made his debut the following 7 January in a 1–0 win at Monterrey.

Paunović left in December 2023 by mutual agreement.

=== Tigres UANL ===
On 9 June 2024, Paunović became head coach of Tigres UANL in the same country and league. On 2 March 2025, he was dismissed.

=== Oviedo ===
Paunović returned to Spain on 26 March 2025, being appointed at second-tier Real Oviedo. On his debut four days later, he oversaw a 2–1 home victory over Málaga thanks to an own goal in injury time. He ultimately guided the Asturians to a third-place finish, and secured top-flight promotion for the first time in 24 years with a 3–1 extra-time defeat of Mirandés in the second leg of the promotion play-off final.

On 9 October 2025, even though his team was placed outside the relegation zone, Paunović was sacked; he was the first manager to be shown the door that season.

=== Serbia senior ===
On 30 October 2025, Paunović replaced the dismissed Dragan Stojković at the helm of the Serbia national side, who stood third in their 2026 FIFA World Cup qualification group with two games remaining. On his debut on 13 November, a 2–0 loss against England at Wembley Stadium ended all hopes of reaching the finals.

== Personal life ==
Paunović experienced hardships while training for football, such as walking for hours to practice and sometimes going without food. His father, Blagoje, was also a footballer; a defender who inspired him, he also played for Partizan and represented Yugoslavia at UEFA Euro 1968, before beginning a managerial career.

Paunović is married and has four children. He is fluent in six languages: English, Spanish, Serbian, Macedonian, Russian and German.

== Career statistics ==
=== Club ===
Appearances and goals by club, season and competition
Club	Season	League			Cup		Continental		Total	
Club	Season	Division	Apps	Goals	Apps	Goals	Apps	Goals	Apps	Goals
Partizan	1994–95	First League	13	1	5	0	0	0	18	1
Marbella (loan)	1995–96	Segunda División	20	2	0	0	0	0	20	2
Atlético Madrid B	1996–97	Segunda División	7	3	0	0	0	0	7	3
Atlético Madrid B	1997–98	Segunda División	15	8	0	0	0	0	15	8
Atlético Madrid B	Total		22	11	0	0	0	0	22	11
Atlético Madrid	1996–97	La Liga	16	1	2	0	1	0	19	1
Atlético Madrid	1997–98	La Liga	14	6	2	0	3	0	19	6
Atlético Madrid	1999–00	La Liga	30	7	4	0	4	0	38	7
Atlético Madrid	2000–01	Segunda División	5	0	0	0	0	0	5	0
Atlético Madrid	Total		52	9	4	0	7	1	63	10
Mallorca (loan)	1998–99	La Liga	24	5	0	0	6	1	30	6
Oviedo (loan)	2000–01	La Liga	22	4	0	0	0	0	22	4
Mallorca (loan)	2001–02	La Liga	33	3	0	0	8	0	41	3
Tenerife	2002–03	Segunda División	38	18	0	0	0	0	38	18
Atlético Madrid	2003–04	La Liga	25	6	2	1	0	0	27	7
Atlético Madrid	2004–05	La Liga	10	0	2	0	3	2	15	2
Atlético Madrid	Total		35	6	4	1	3	2	42	9
Hannover	2004–05	Bundesliga	6	0	1	0	0	0	7	0
Getafe	2005–06	La Liga	30	10	1	3	0	0	31	13
Getafe	2006–07	La Liga	14	0	3	1	0	0	17	1
Getafe	Total		44	10	4	4	0	0	48	14
Rubin Kazan	2007	Russian Premier League	16	1	2	1	0	0	18	2
Almería	2007–08	La Liga	7	2	0	0	0	0	7	2
Partizan	2008–09	Serbian SuperLiga	9	1	1	0	8	1	18	2
Philadelphia Union	2011	Major League Soccer	17	3	0	0	0	0	17	3
Career total			358	76	21	6	32	5	411	87

=== International ===
Scores and results list Serbia and Montenegro's goal tally first, score column indicates score after each Paunović goal.

List of international goals scored by Veljko Paunović
No.	Date	Venue	Opponent	Score	Result	Competition
1	28 April 2004	Windsor Park, Belfast, Northern Ireland	Northern Ireland	1–0	1–1	Friendly

== Managerial statistics ==
As of match played 16 November 2026

Coaching record by team and tenure
Team	From	To	Record				
Team	From	To	P	W	D	L	Win %
Serbia U20/U19/U18	1 October 2012	30 June 2015	16	10	3	3	62.50
Chicago Fire	24 November 2015	13 November 2019	148	46	39	63	31.08
Reading	29 August 2020	19 February 2022	83	29	18	36	34.94
Guadalajara	31 October 2022	15 December 2023	50	27	8	15	54.00
Tigres UANL	9 June 2024	2 March 2025	35	20	6	9	57.14
Oviedo	26 March 2025	9 October 2025	22	11	4	7	50.00
Serbia	30 October 2025	Present	12	2	0	10	16.67
Total			366	145	78	143	39.62

== Honours ==
=== Manager ===
Serbia

- FIFA U-20 World Cup: 2015

Individual

- EFL Championship Manager of the Month: September 2020
