= Dani García (footballer, born 1974) =

Spanish footballer

Personal information
- Full name: Daniel García Lara
- Date of birth: 22 December 1974 (age 51)
- Place of birth: Cerdanyola, Spain
- Height: 1.83 m (6 ft 0 in)
- Position: Striker

Youth career
- 1985–1987: Masflorit Cerdanyola
- 1987–1990: Damm
- 1990–1993: Real Madrid

Senior career*
Years	Team	Apps	(Gls)
1993–1995	Real Madrid B	71	(20)
1994–1998	Real Madrid	10	(0)
1995–1997	→ Zaragoza (loan)	71	(8)
1998–1999	Mallorca	36	(12)
1999–2004	Barcelona	50	(12)
2004	Zaragoza	15	(2)
2004–2005	Espanyol	26	(5)
2005–2007	Olympiacos	19	(2)
2007	Denizlispor	11	(4)
2007–2008	Rayo Majadahonda	31	(8)
Total		340	(73)

International career
1991	Spain U16	4	(2)
1991	Spain U17	5	(2)
1993	Spain U18	7	(2)
1994–1996	Spain U21	14	(6)
1996–1997	Spain U23	7	(0)
1998–2000	Spain	5	(1)
Medal record
Men's football
Representing Spain
FIFA U-17 World Cup
Runner-up	1991 Italy
UEFA Euro U-16
Winner	1991 Switzerland
- * Club domestic league appearances and goals

Daniel 'Dani' García Lara (born 22 December 1974) is a Spanish former professional footballer who played as a striker.

During his career, he played for five teams in his country while also having short spells in Greece and Turkey. Having represented both Real Madrid and Barcelona, he achieved La Liga figures of 208 matches and 39 goals over 12 seasons.

== Club career ==
Born in Cerdanyola del Vallès, Barcelona, Catalonia, García was a graduate of Real Madrid's youth system. He made his first-team debut on 5 February 1994, in a 2–0 home win over Deportivo de La Coruña; he played another match in the 1994–95 campaign while still registered with the reserves.

García then spent two years on loan at Real Zaragoza, featuring prominently to earn him a return to the Santiago Bernabéu Stadium. Following a season with only eight appearances, and with the player later commenting that "I did not even have a chance to fail at Real Madrid", he was sold to fellow La Liga club RCD Mallorca, being the Balearic Islands team's top scorer in 1998–99 as they achieved a first-ever qualification for the UEFA Champions League; he also helped them to reach the final of the UEFA Cup Winners' Cup, where he scored to tie an eventual 2–1 loss to SS Lazio in Birmingham.

Subsequently, García signed for FC Barcelona. In his first year, he managed to score 11 La Liga goals (third-best in the squad) without being an undisputed starter, but subsequent loss of form and injuries limited him to nine league games between 2001 and 2003. On 18 April 2000, he scored a crucial goal at the Camp Nou to help to the Champions League semi-finals: trailing 4–3 on aggregate to Chelsea, he found the net with seven minutes left to send the tie to extra time, where his side netted a further two to progress.

García spent the first months of the 2003–04 season unregistered and training on his own, returning to Zaragoza in January 2004 and helping the Aragonese to escape relegation and win the 2004 edition of the Copa del Rey, scoring against former employers Real Madrid in an extra-time victory in Barcelona. During his second stint at La Romareda, he played with David Villa.

After one season with RCD Espanyol, agreeing to terminate his two-year contract in July 2005 due to problems with some teammates, García switched to Greece's Olympiacos F.C. where he teamed up with former Barça teammate Rivaldo, and then to Turkish club Denizlispor. In July 2007, he returned to Madrid to settle with his family, and had a short spell with amateurs CF Rayo Majadahonda of Tercera División. he retired shortly after, then went back to Real Madrid in the indoor soccer variety.

== International career ==
García made his Spain national team debut against Italy in an 18 November 1998 friendly in Salerno (2–2). He represented the country at the 1996 Summer Olympics in Atlanta, Georgia.

Previously, García helped the under-17s win the UEFA European Championship (then under-16) in 1991 and finish runner-up at the FIFA World Cup in the same year.

== Career statistics ==
Scores and results list Spain's goal tally first, score column indicates score after each García goal.

List of international goals scored by Dani García
No.	Date	Venue	Opponent	Score	Result	Competition
1	5 May 1999	La Cartuja, Seville, Spain	Croatia	3–1	3–1	Friendly

== Honours ==
Real Madrid

- La Liga: 1994–95
- Supercopa de España: 1997
- UEFA Champions League: 1997–98

Mallorca

- Supercopa de España: 1998
- UEFA Cup Winners' Cup runner-up: 1998–99

Zaragoza

- Copa del Rey: 2003–04

Olympiacos

- Super League Greece: 2005–06
- Greek Football Cup: 2005–06

Spain U16

- UEFA European Under-16 Championship: 1991

Spain U17

- FIFA U-17 World Cup runner-up: 1991
