= Óscar Arpón =

Spanish footballer and manager

Personal information
- Full name: Óscar Arpón Ochoa
- Date of birth: 9 April 1975 (age 51)
- Place of birth: Calahorra, Spain
- Height: 1.83 m (6 ft 0 in)
- Position: Midfielder

Youth career
- Barcelona

Senior career*
Years	Team	Apps	(Gls)
1994–1995	Barcelona B	16	(1)
1995	Barcelona	3	(0)
1995–1996	Betis	18	(1)
1996–1998	Racing Santander	53	(3)
1998–1999	Mallorca	13	(0)
1999–2001	Osasuna	49	(2)
2001–2002	Poli Ejido	40	(9)
2002–2004	Recreativo	61	(0)
2004–2007	Salamanca	99	(9)
2007–2009	Gimnàstic	44	(2)
2009–2011	Logroñés	42	(2)
2011–2012	River Ebro	?	(1)
Total		438+	(30)

International career
1990–1991	Spain U16	5	(0)
1991	Spain U17	5	(1)
1992	Spain U18	7	(0)
1992	Spain U19	7	(1)
1997	Spain U23	4	(0)

Managerial career
- 2012–2013: River Ebro (assistant)
- 2013–2015: River Ebro
- 2016–2018: Alfaro
- * Club domestic league appearances and goals

Óscar Arpón Ochoa (born 9 April 1975) is a Spanish former professional footballer who played as an attacking midfielder. He later worked as a manager.

He amassed La Liga totals of 141 games and five goals over seven seasons, in representation of six clubs, including Barcelona. He added 230 matches and 18 goals in the Segunda División, in an 18-year senior career.

== Club career ==
Arpón was born in Calahorra, La Rioja. He made his professional debut in 1994–95 in the Segunda División, with FC Barcelona B. Also, in that season's La Liga, he appeared in three matches for the main squad, being promoted roughly at the same time as Roger García.

After a move to Real Betis where he featured sparingly, Arpón lived his most fruitful years in the top flight with Racing de Santander, contributing regularly to two consecutive mid-table positions by the Cantabrians. From then on he resumed his career in the second tier, with brief spells in the first (RCD Mallorca, CA Osasuna, Recreativo de Huelva).

In August 2009, having had a slow campaign with Gimnàstic de Tarragona, Arpón signed for third-tier UD Logroñés. He retired three years later, after one season in amateur football with CA River Ebro in his native region, aged 37.

== Honours ==
Barcelona

- Supercopa de España: 1994

Mallorca

- Supercopa de España: 1998

Recreativo

- Copa del Rey runner-up: 2002–03

Salamanca

- Segunda División B: 2005–06
