= Samuel Okunowo =

Nigerian footballer

Personal information
- Full name: Samuel Gbenga Okunowo
- Date of birth: 1 March 1979 (age 47)
- Place of birth: Ibadan, Nigeria
- Height: 1.80 m (5 ft 11 in)
- Position: Right back

Youth career
- Liberty Boys Club
- Exide Sparkers
- 1993–1995: Kwara Bombers
- 1997–1998: Barcelona

Senior career*
Years	Team	Apps	(Gls)
1995–1997	Shooting Stars		
1998–2001	Barcelona	14	(0)
1998–2001	→ Barcelona B		
1999–2000	→ Benfica (loan)	9	(1)
2000–2001	→ Badajoz (loan)	0	(0)
2001–2003	Ionikos	0	(0)
2003–2004	Dinamo București	2	(0)
2004–2005	KF Tirana	0	(0)
2005–2007	Metalurh Donetsk	2	(0)
2006–2007	→ Stal Alchevsk (loan)	11	(0)
2009	VB Sports	4	(0)
2009	Waltham Forest	20	(0)
2012–2013	Sunshine Stars	30	(3)
Total		92	(4)

International career
1999	Nigeria U20	5	(0)
1997–2000	Nigeria	8	(0)
2000	Nigeria Olympic	3	(0)
- * Club domestic league appearances and goals

Samuel Gbenga Okunowo (born 1 March 1979) is a Nigerian former footballer who played mainly as a right back.

Injury affected the vast majority of his professional career, which was spent in eight countries other than his own.

== Club career ==
Born in Ibadan, Okunowo signed with La Liga club FC Barcelona at the age of 18. In the 1998–99 season he competed for the starting spot in the first team with Michael Reiziger, and managed 21 appearances all competitions comprised (15 starts) as the Catalans went on to win the national championship.

However, Okunowo did not manage to remain with Barça, going on to serve two unassuming loans, with Portugal's S.L. Benfica and Spanish second division club CD Badajoz and being released in June 2002. He went on to represent – with very little impact as well – teams in four countries: Greece, Romania, Albania and Ukraine.

In 2007, Okunowo was on trial at Northwich Victoria of the Conference National and Vilanova del Camí in the Spanish amateur leagues, but nothing came of it. Two years later, he returned to active with VB Sports Club in the Maldives; in October 2009, however, he joined England's Waltham Forest, playing in a league eight levels below the Premier League.

In February 2010, Okunowo underwent a trial with Polish Ekstraklasa side Odra Wodzislaw, in an attempt to return to top flight football, but nothing materialized. He also met the same fate whilst looking for a club in Norway.

On 5 January 2012, Okunowo returned to his homeland and signed with Sunshine Stars F.C. for one Nigerian Premier League campaign. He retired the following year, aged 34.

== International career ==
Okunowo represented Nigeria at the 1999 FIFA World Youth Championship (helping the hosts reach the quarter-finals), the 2000 African Cup of Nations and the 2000 Summer Olympics, winning eight caps with the senior team.

== Personal life ==
In July 2012, Okunowo lost all his possessions when a fire broke in his mansion in Ibadan. He subsequently reached out for help from former club Barcelona, which obliged.
