= Andrija Balajić =

Croatian footballer (born 1972)

Andrija Balajić (čjš)
Personal information
- Date of birth: 22 August 1972 (age 54)
- Place of birth: Sinj, SFR Yugoslavia
- Height: 1.83 m (6 ft 0 in)
- Position: Defender

Youth career
- Junak Sinj
- Varteks

Senior career*
Years	Team	Apps	(Gls)
1992–1996	Varteks	75	(10)
1996–1997	Sporting CP	3	(0)
1997–2000	Varteks	83	(6)
2000–2001	Hapoel Be'er Sheva	20	(3)
2001–2002	Varteks	17	(0)
2002–2003	Ashdod	20	(0)
2003–2004	Hajduk Split	9	(3)
2004–2006	Lilas Vasilikou		
2006	Levadiakos	8	(2)
2007	Trikala	15	(0)
2007–2010	Varteks	53	(1)
2011–2012	Ormož		
2013	Polet Cestica		
2013	Obreš Sveti Ilija		
2014	Spartak Mala Subtoica		
2015–2016	USV Markt Hartmannsdorf	37	(6)

International career^{‡}
1996–1997	Croatia	3	(0)
- * Club domestic league appearances and goals as of 13 May 2010 ‡ National team caps and goals as of 18:40, 14 September 2009 (UTC)

Andrija Balajić (born 22 August 1972) is a Croatian former football defender, who last played for Austrian amateur side USV Markt Hartmannsdorf.

== Club career ==
He spent the majority of his career at Varteks, with short spells in Portugal, Israel and Greece, as well as playing briefly for Croatian giants Hajduk Split in the 2003–04 season.

== International career ==
He made his debut for Croatia in a March 1996 friendly match against Israel, coming on as a 46th-minute substitute in for Milan Rapaić, and earned a total of 3 caps scoring no goals. His final international was a June 1997 Kirin Cup match against Japan.
