= Leonardo Biagini =

Argentine footballer

Personal information
- Full name: Leonardo Ángel Biagini
- Date of birth: 13 April 1977 (age 49)
- Place of birth: Arroyo Seco, Argentina
- Height: 1.82 m (6 ft 0 in)
- Position: Striker

Senior career*
Years	Team	Apps	(Gls)
1993–1995	Newell's Old Boys	33	(5)
1995–1997	Atlético Madrid	50	(4)
1997–1998	Mérida	27	(1)
1998–2003	Mallorca	68	(13)
2002	→ Portsmouth (loan)	8	(2)
2003–2004	Rayo Vallecano	28	(7)
2004–2006	Sporting Gijón	46	(13)
2006–2007	Albacete	25	(5)
2007–2008	Arsenal Sarandí	13	(3)
Total		298	(53)

International career
1993	Argentina U17	3	(2)
1995	Argentina U20	5	(2)
Medal record
Men's football
Representing Argentina
FIFA U-20 World Cup
Winner	1995 Qatar
- * Club domestic league appearances and goals

Leonardo Ángel Biagini (born 13 April 1977) is an Argentine former professional footballer who played as a striker.

Most of his career was spent in Spain where he represented six clubs in 12 years, totalling 145 matches and 18 goals in La Liga and adding 99 appearances and 25 goals in the Segunda División; he was part of Atlético Madrid's squad when they won the double in 1996. He returned to his country in 2007.

Biagini won the 1995 FIFA World Youth Championship with Argentina.

== Career ==
Born in Arroyo Seco, Santa Fe, Biagini started his career at Newell's Old Boys in the Primera División, in 1993. In 1995, he was a main part of the Argentina under-20 team that won the FIFA World Cup in Qatar.

Biagini signed for Atlético Madrid at just 18, being an important attacking player as the capital club claimed the double in his first year. He was mainly and regularly used as a substitute for compatriot Juan Esnáider and Kiko during his spell and, after a poor second season, moved to fellow La Liga side CP Mérida in the summer of 1997, where he would be relegated.

Biagini then spent five seasons with RCD Mallorca where, safe for his first where he scored a career-best 11 goals (also helping the team to the final of the 1998–99 UEFA Cup Winners' Cup by scoring the 1–0 winner against Chelsea in the last-four's second leg, in a 2–1 aggregate victory), he would be scarcely utilised due to several injury problems, also serving a six-month loan at England's Portsmouth in the First Division, where he found the net against Millwall and Wimbledon.

Biagini returned to Spain and Mallorca for the 2002–03 campaign, being part of the squad that won Copa del Rey – even though he did not appear in any matches – and being subsequently released. After four additional years in the Segunda División, in representation of three teams, he returned home and joined Arsenal de Sarandí.

== Honours ==
Atlético Madrid

- La Liga: 1995–96
- Copa del Rey: 1995–96

Mallorca

- Supercopa de España: 1998

Arsenal Sarandí

- Copa Sudamericana: 2007

Argentina

- FIFA U-20 World Cup: 1995

Individual

- South American Youth Football Championship top scorer: 1995 (4 goals)
