= Ángel Pérez (footballer, born 1981) =

Spanish footballer

Personal information
- Full name: Ángel Luis Pérez Pérez
- Date of birth: 21 February 1981 (age 45)
- Place of birth: Avilés, Spain
- Height: 1.80 m (5 ft 11 in)
- Position: Right back

Youth career
- Avilés
- Oviedo

Senior career*
Years	Team	Apps	(Gls)
2000–2001	Oviedo B		
2001–2002	Oviedo	41	(0)
2003	Mallorca	1	(0)
2003–2005	Córdoba	12	(0)
2005–2006	Numancia	2	(0)
2006–2008	Palencia	14	(1)
2008–2009	Marino	22	(0)
2009–2012	Montañeros	85	(2)
2012–2014	Racing Ferrol	4	(0)
2014–2018	Llanera	30	(2)
Total		211	(5)
- * Club domestic league appearances and goals

Ángel Luis Pérez Pérez (born 21 February 1981 in Avilés, Asturias), sometimes known simply as Ángel, is a Spanish former footballer who played as a right back.
