= Günter Benkö =

Austrian football referee

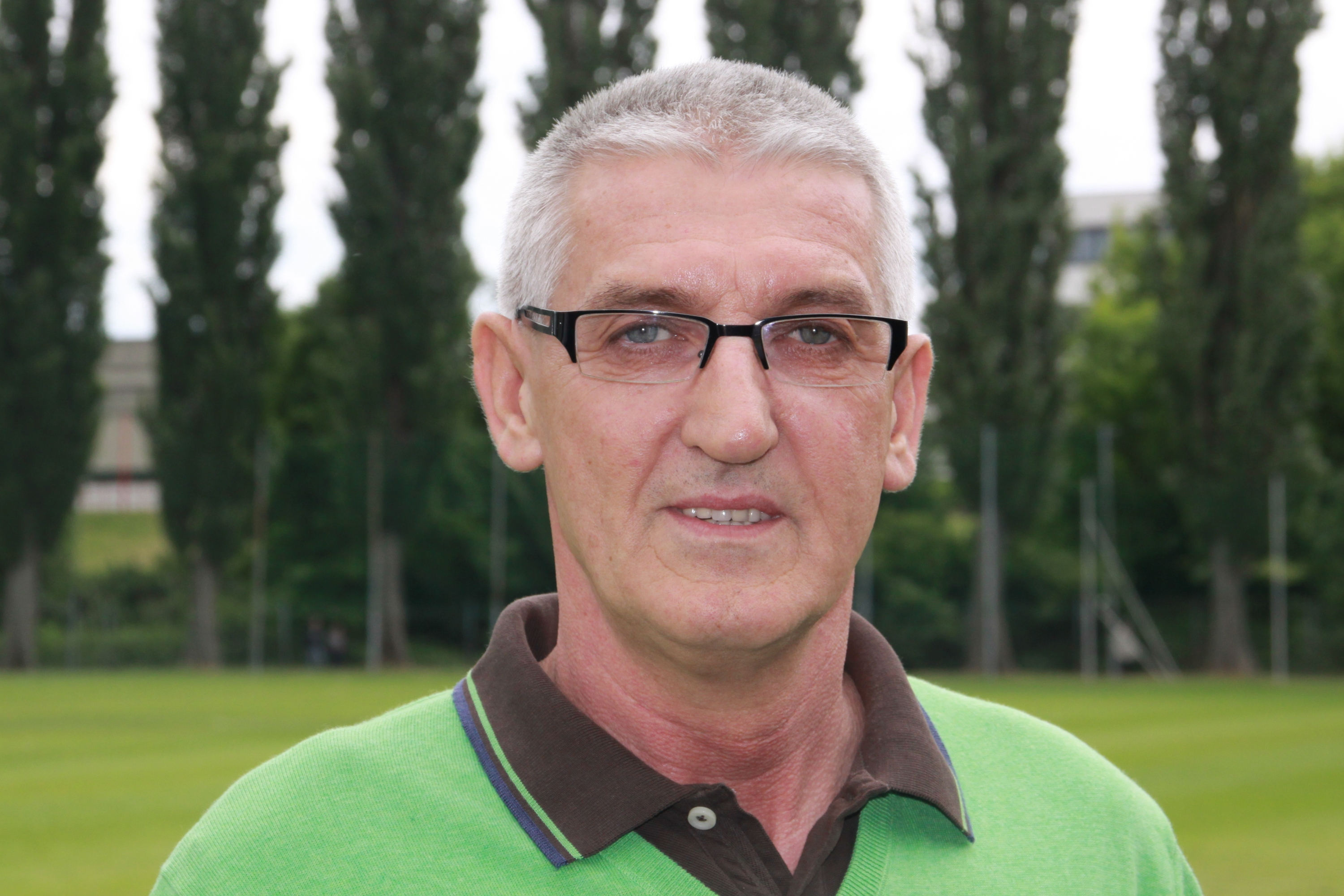
- Born: 12 July 1955 (age 71); Oberwart, Austria

Domestic
Years	League	Role
1990-2000	Austrian Bundesliga	Referee

International
Years	League	Role
1991-2000	FIFA-listed	Referee

Günter Benkö (born 12 July 1955 in Oberwart, Burgenland) is a retired football (soccer) referee from Austria, best known for supervising two matches during the 1998 FIFA World Cup in France. He also led two matches at the 2000 UEFA European Football Championship held in Belgium and the Netherlands. Benkö was in charge of the final of the UEFA Cup Winners' Cup 1998-99, on May 19, 1999 in Villa Park, Birmingham, between S.S. Lazio and RCD Mallorca.

Preceded by UEFA Cup Winners' Cup Final 1998 (Italy) Stefano Braschi	UEFA Cup Winners' Cup Final Referees; Final 1999 (Austria) Günter Benkö	Succeeded by 'Last tournament
