= Ariel López (footballer, born 1974) =

Argentine footballer

Personal information
- Full name: Ariel Maximiliano López
- Date of birth: 5 April 1974 (age 52)
- Place of birth: Lanús, Argentina
- Height: 1.76 m (5 ft 9 in)
- Position: Striker

Youth career
- Lanús

Senior career*
Years	Team	Apps	(Gls)
1994–1997	Lanús	136	(50)
1998	Genoa C.F.C.	17	(4)
1998–2003	Real Mallorca	23	(3)
1999–2000	→ San Lorenzo (loan)	29	(6)
2000–2001	→ Lanús (loan)	39	(9)
2003	Hércules CF	3	(0)
2003–2004	Quilmes	44	(12)
2005–2006	Necaxa	50	(18)
2006–2007	→ UNAM Pumas (loan)	22	(6)
- * Club domestic league appearances and goals ‡ National team caps and goals as of May 2008

Ariel Maximiliano López (born 5 April 1974 in Lanús) is a former Argentine football player.

López played for Club Atlético Lanús Club Atlético Quilmes and San Lorenzo in his native country. He was transferred to the Argentine giant River Plate but the transaction was cancelled for a supposed knee injury.

In 1996, he was the top scorer in the Clausura tournament.

López has also played for RCD Mallorca and Hércules CF in Spain, as well as Genoa C.F.C. in Italy. Whilst at Mallorca he helped them to the 1999 UEFA Cup Winners' Cup Final, for which he was an unused substitute.

He finished his career, in 2007, playing for UNAM Pumas
