= Lluís Carreras =

Spanish footballer (born 1972)

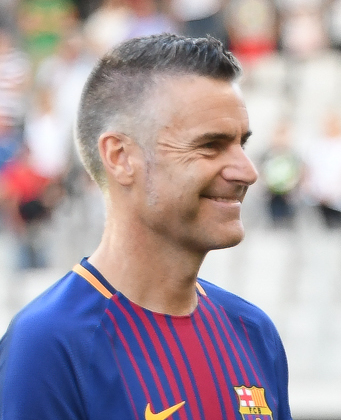
- Carreras in 2018

Personal information
- Full name: Lluís Carreras Ferrer
- Date of birth: 24 September 1972 (age 54)
- Place of birth: Sant Pol de Mar, Spain
- Height: 1.83 m (6 ft 0 in)
- Position: Left-back

Youth career
- 1985–1989: Barcelona

Senior career*
Years	Team	Apps	(Gls)
1988–1990	Barcelona C	1	(0)
1990–1993	Barcelona B	85	(22)
1993–1996	Barcelona	19	(0)
1993–1994	→ Oviedo (loan)	30	(1)
1994–1995	→ Racing Santander (loan)	26	(1)
1996–2001	Mallorca	94	(8)
2001–2003	Atlético Madrid	36	(2)
2003–2004	Murcia	15	(0)
2004–2007	Alavés	28	(0)
Total		334	(34)

International career
1988–1989	Spain U16	2	(1)
1990	Spain U18	3	(0)
1992–1994	Spain U21	7	(0)

Managerial career
- 2008–2009: Alavés B (assistant)
- 2009–2010: Alavés B
- 2010–2013: Sabadell
- 2014: Mallorca
- 2015–2016: Zaragoza
- 2017: Gimnàstic
- 2019: Sagan Tosu
Medal record
Men's football
Representing Spain
UEFA European Under-21 Championship
Bronze medal – third place	1994 France
- * Club domestic league appearances and goals

Lluís Carreras Ferrer (born 24 September 1972) is a Spanish former professional footballer who played mostly as a left-back but also as a defensive midfielder. He is currently a manager.

He started his career with Barcelona, without much success, and went on to amass La Liga totals of 169 matches and eight goals in representation of six other clubs. He added 149 games and 25 goals in the Segunda División, over six seasons.

After retiring, Carreras became a coach and guided Sabadell to promotion to Segunda División in the first of his three seasons. He also managed Mallorca, Zaragoza and Gimnàstic de Tarragona, all of them in the Spanish second tier.

== Playing career ==
Born in Sant Pol de Mar, Barcelona, Catalonia, Carreras was a product of Barcelona's famed youth system, La Masia. He made his first-team debut on 4 April 1993 in a 3–0 home win against Logroñés, in what would be his only La Liga match of the season.

After two consecutive loans, at Real Oviedo and Racing de Santander, Carreras returned to Barça. Although he appeared regularly in 1995–96's league, they came out empty in silverware.

Carreras then lived his most steady period at Mallorca, although never an undisputed starter. He achieved top-flight promotion in his first season, totalling 128 competitive appearances during his spell in the Balearic Islands.

Subsequently, Carreras had similar experiences with both Atlético Madrid and Alavés. He featured regularly in both clubs' promotion from Segunda División, but saw very little time the following campaigns; in between, he spent 2003–04 with Real Murcia also in the top division.

Carreras' career would end on a sour note. When playing for Basque Country's Alavés, he clashed with eccentric owner/chairman/manager Dmitry Piterman; teammate Roberto Bonano, who stepped up in his defence, was also suspended.

== Coaching career ==
After retiring, Carreras returned to his last club to have his first head coaching experience in 2009, with the reserves in the Tercera División. In his debut campaign at the helm of Sabadell, he led them to promotion to the second tier 18 years later.

On 30 May 2013, in spite of avoiding relegation for the second time in a row, Carreras resigned amid rumors he could sign for a top team in the same league. It finally happened on 26 February of the following year when he was appointed at the helm of RCD Mallorca, replacing the fired José Luis Oltra.

Carreras was relieved of his duties on 20 May 2014, having won only ten points out of 36. On 27 December 2015 he was named Real Zaragoza manager but, after failing to reach the play-off positions with a 6–2 loss at already relegated Llagostera in the last matchday of the season, he resigned.

On 21 June 2017, Carreras signed a two-year contract with another second-division club, Gimnàstic de Tarragona. He achieved one draw and three losses in four games, then was dismissed.

Carreras was hired by a foreign club for the first time in December 2018, when Japan's Sagan Tosu named him as manager for the upcoming season; they had recently secured the high-profile transfer of his former Atlético teammate Fernando Torres. He resigned the following 5 May, with the side last-placed having scored just once in their first ten J1 League matches.

Carreras later worked as a pundit. He was also the sporting director in the staff presented by candidate Toni Freixa in the 2021 Barcelona presidential elections.

== Managerial statistics ==
As of 9 January 2020

Managerial record by team and tenure
Team	Nat	From	To	Record								Ref
Team	Nat	From	To	G	W	D	L	GF	GA	GD	Win %	Ref
Alavés B	(Spain)	12 February 2009	29 June 2010	48	21	10	17	86	51	+35	43.75	
Sabadell	(Spain)	29 June 2010	30 May 2013	133	47	39	47	150	166	−16	35.34	
Mallorca	(Spain)	26 February 2014	20 May 2014	12	2	4	6	8	15	−7	16.67	
Zaragoza	(Spain)	27 December 2015	6 June 2016	24	10	7	7	31	29	+2	41.67	
Gimnàstic	(Spain)	22 June 2017	9 September 2017	5	0	2	3	2	9	−7	0.00	
Sagan Tosu	(Japan)	22 December 2018	30 April 2019	13	2	2	9	4	19	−15	15.38	
Total				235	82	64	89	281	289	−8	34.89	—

== Honours ==
Barcelona

- La Liga: 1992–93

Mallorca

- Supercopa de España: 1998

Atlético Madrid

- Segunda División: 2001–02

Spain U21

- UEFA European Under-21 Championship third place: 1994
