= Carlitos (footballer, born 1976) =

Spanish footballer

Personal information
- Full name: Carlos Domínguez Domínguez
- Date of birth: 18 September 1976 (age 50)
- Place of birth: Mairena del Aljarafe, Spain
- Height: 1.67 m (5 ft 6 in)
- Position: Forward

Youth career
- Sevilla

Senior career*
Years	Team	Apps	(Gls)
1995–1998	Sevilla	71	(12)
1997	→ Mallorca (loan)	20	(9)
1998–2003	Mallorca	111	(16)
2003–2005	Sevilla	41	(7)
2006	Hércules	16	(0)
2007	Granada	11	(2)
Total		270	(46)

International career
1992	Spain U16	10	(4)
1994–1995	Spain U18	14	(7)
1995	Spain U19	2	(0)
- * Club domestic league appearances and goals

Carlos Domínguez Domínguez (born 18 September 1976), known as Carlitos, is a Spanish former professional footballer who played as a forward.

Over nine seasons, he amassed La Liga totals of 192 matches and 27 goals, with Mallorca (five years) and Sevilla (four).

== Club career ==
With speed as his main asset, Carlitos was best known for his stints with Sevilla FC, in whose youth system he grew, and RCD Mallorca. Born in Mairena del Aljarafe, Province of Seville, he started his professional career in the 1995–96 season with the Andalusians, then served a six-month loan spell in the Balearic Islands, being instrumental in the latter club's La Liga return in 1997 by scoring nine goals.

Carlitos then returned to Sevilla for a solid campaign, after which he was definitely sold to Mallorca, appearing regularly over five years although he was used mainly as a substitute, a recurring trait in his top-division career. His best output came in 1999–2000 when he netted nine times in 29 league matches, including a brace against Sevilla in a 4–0 away win. On 3 May 2003, playing just one minute at Real Madrid, he scored in a 5–1 victory.

In the summer of 2003, Carlitos joined Sevilla for a third spell, although he would appear much less during this time. After not featuring at all in the first part of his third season, he was allowed to leave in the January transfer window, signing with Segunda División team Hércules CF. In a similar move, he retired definitely from the game the following year after a short stint with lowly Granada CF.

== Honours ==
Mallorca

- Copa del Rey: 2002–03

Spain U18

- UEFA European Under-18 Championship: 1995
