= Miquel Soler =

Spanish footballer (born 1965)

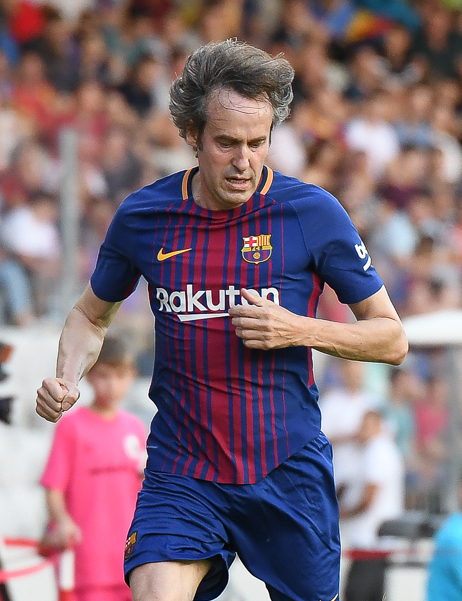
- Soler in 2018

Personal information
- Full name: Miquel Soler Sarasols
- Date of birth: 16 March 1965 (age 61)
- Place of birth: Girona, Spain
- Height: 1.83 m (6 ft 0 in)
- Positions: Left-back; midfielder

Youth career
- 1979–1983: Olot

Senior career*
Years	Team	Apps	(Gls)
1983–1988	Español	118	(3)
1985–1986	→ Hospitalet (loan)	17	(2)
1988–1995	Barcelona	81	(2)
1991–1992	→ Atlético Madrid (loan)	25	(1)
1993–1995	→ Sevilla (loan)	75	(1)
1995–1996	Real Madrid	14	(1)
1996–1998	Zaragoza	39	(2)
1998–2003	Mallorca	152	(1)
Total		521	(13)

International career
1983	Spain U18	1	(0)
1986–1987	Spain U21	3	(0)
1987	Spain U23	2	(0)
1987–1991	Spain	9	(0)
1993–1998	Catalonia	3	(0)

Managerial career
- 2011–2014: Mallorca B
- 2014: Mallorca
- 2015: Mallorca
- * Club domestic league appearances and goals

Miquel Soler Sarasols (born 16 March 1965) is a Spanish former football player and manager.

Mainly a left-back who could also operate as a wide midfielder, his career spanned two La Liga decades (with 652 competitive matches), and he was the only player to represent both Barcelona and Madrid main clubs.

Soler appeared for Spain at Euro 1988.

== Club career ==
Born in Girona, Catalonia, Soler was a RCD Espanyol youth graduate, making his first-team – and La Liga – debut in the 1983–84 season and becoming first-choice following a loan to neighbouring CE L'Hospitalet. In his fourth year, as the club finished third after the second stage, he appeared in 41 out of 42 games and scored two goals, going on to help it to reach the final of the 1987–88 UEFA Cup, netting in the 3–0 home win in the first leg as the Pericos eventually lost on penalties against Bayer 04 Leverkusen.

Subsequently, Soler joined FC Barcelona, winning the UEFA Cup Winners' Cup in his first season while also playing 23 matches in the league. After a sole campaign with Atlético Madrid, where he won his second Copa del Rey, he returned to Barcelona, with no impact.

After two excellent years with Sevilla FC, still on loan from Barcelona, Soler moved to Real Madrid, but appeared scarcely during 1995–96 (his only season) as coach Arsenio Iglesias was ordered by chairman Lorenzo Sanz not to utilise him as he would be automatically renewed if he played the required number of 20 matches. Following a spell with Real Zaragoza he was still able, at 33, to sign for RCD Mallorca, where he made a further 152 top-flight appearances, winning another domestic cup and retiring at the end of 2002–03; he totalled 504 games at that level, scoring 11 times.

Soler started working as a manager with Mallorca's reserves, going on to be in charge of the team for three years, two in the Segunda División B. In the summer of 2014, he was appointed at the helm of the main squad in the Segunda División, being relieved of his duties one month later following a directorial change but returning in February 2015 after his successor Valery Karpin was dismissed.

== International career ==
Soler won nine caps for the Spain national side, and represented the nation at UEFA Euro 1988, where he appeared in the win against Denmark (playing the second half) and the loss to Italy. His debut came in a Euro 1988 qualifier in Bucharest, a 3–1 defeat against Romania on 29 April 1987.

== Managerial statistics ==
As of 20 June 2015

Managerial record by team and tenure
Team	Nat	From	To	Record							
Team	Nat	From	To	G	W	D	L	GF	GA	GD	Win %
Mallorca B	(Spain)	22 June 2011	11 July 2014	118	51	29	38	177	128	+49	43.22
Mallorca	(Spain)	11 July 2014	12 August 2014	0	0	0	0	0	0	+0	—
Mallorca	(Spain)	10 February 2015	20 June 2015	18	6	3	9	21	27	−6	33.33
Career total				136	57	32	47	198	155	+43	41.91

== Honours ==
Barcelona

- La Liga: 1990–91, 1992–93
- Copa del Rey: 1989–90
- UEFA Cup Winners' Cup: 1988–89; runner-up: 1990–91

Atlético Madrid

- Copa del Rey: 1991–92

Mallorca

- Copa del Rey: 2002–03
- Supercopa de España: 1998
- UEFA Cup Winners' Cup runner-up: 1998–99

== See also ==
- List of La Liga players (400+ appearances)
