= 1998–99 La Liga =

68th season of La Liga

La Liga
- Season: 1998–99
- Dates: 29 August 1998 – 20 June 1999
- Champions: Barcelona; 16th title
- Relegated: Extremadura (relegation playoff); Villarreal (relegation playoff); Tenerife; Salamanca
- Champions League: Barcelona; Real Madrid; Mallorca; Valencia
- UEFA Cup: Celta Vigo; Deportivo La Coruña; Atlético Madrid (as Copa del Rey runners-up)
- Intertoto Cup: Espanyol
- Matches: 380
- Goals: 1,003 (2.64 per match)
- Top goalscorer: Raúl (25 goals)
- Biggest home win: Barcelona 7–1 Alavés (3 January 1999)
- Biggest away win: Extremadura 1–5 Real Madrid (31 October 1998)
- Highest scoring: Barcelona 7–1 Alavés (3 January 1999); Celta Vigo 6–2 Real Oviedo (3 January 1999); Athletic Bilbao 3–5 Real Oviedo (15 November 1998)

The 1998–99 La Liga season was the 68th since its establishment. It began on 29 August 1998, and concluded on 20 June 1999.

== Promotion and relegation ==
Twenty teams competed in the league – the top seventeen teams from the previous season and the three teams promoted from the Segunda División. The promoted teams were Alavés (playing top flight football for the first time in forty two years), Extremadura (returning after a one-year absence) and Villarreal (playing in the top flight for the first time ever). They replaced Compostela, Mérida and Sporting Gijón after spending time in the top flight for four, one and twenty one years respectively.

== Team information ==
=== Clubs and locations ===
Location of teams in La Liga 1998–99
Canary Islands

1998–99 season was composed of the following clubs:

| Team | Stadium | Capacity |
|---|---|---|
| Barcelona | Camp Nou | 98,772 |
| Real Madrid | Santiago Bernabéu | 80,354 |
| Espanyol | Estadi Olímpic de Montjuïc | 55,926 |
| Atlético Madrid | Vicente Calderón | 55,005 |
| Valencia | Mestalla | 55,000 |
| Real Betis | Benito Villamarín | 52,132 |
| Athletic Bilbao | San Mamés | 39,750 |
| Deportivo de La Coruña | Riazor | 34,600 |
| Real Zaragoza | La Romareda | 34,596 |
| Celta de Vigo | Balaídos | 32,500 |
| Real Sociedad | Anoeta | 32,200 |
| Valladolid | José Zorrilla | 27,846 |
| Tenerife | Heliodoro Rodríguez López | 22,824 |
| Racing de Santander | El Sardinero | 22,222 |
| Villarreal | El Madrigal | 22,000 |
| Alavés | Mendizorrotza | 19,840 |
| Mallorca | Lluís Sitjar | 18,000 |
| Salamanca | El Helmántico | 17,341 |
| Real Oviedo | Carlos Tartiere | 16,500 |
| Extremadura | Francisco de la Hera | 11,580 |

== League table ==
| Pos | Team | Pld | W | D | L | GF | GA | GD | Pts | Qualification or relegation |
|---|---|---|---|---|---|---|---|---|---|---|
| 1 | Barcelona (C) | 38 | 24 | 7 | 7 | 87 | 43 | +44 | 79 | Qualification for the Champions League group stage |
| 2 | Real Madrid | 38 | 21 | 5 | 12 | 77 | 62 | +15 | 68 | Qualification for the Champions League group stage |
| 3 | Mallorca | 38 | 20 | 6 | 12 | 48 | 31 | +17 | 66 | Qualification for the Champions League third qualifying round |
| 4 | Valencia | 38 | 19 | 8 | 11 | 63 | 39 | +24 | 65 | Qualification for the Champions League third qualifying round |
| 5 | Celta Vigo | 38 | 17 | 13 | 8 | 69 | 41 | +28 | 64 | Qualification for the UEFA Cup first round |
| 6 | Deportivo La Coruña | 38 | 17 | 12 | 9 | 55 | 43 | +12 | 63 | Qualification for the UEFA Cup first round |
| 7 | Espanyol | 38 | 16 | 13 | 9 | 49 | 38 | +11 | 61 | Qualification for the Intertoto Cup third round |
| 8 | Athletic Bilbao (Note: Despite being qualified and registered, Athletic Bilbao refused to play Intertoto) | 38 | 17 | 9 | 12 | 53 | 47 | +6 | 60 | |
| 9 | Zaragoza | 38 | 16 | 9 | 13 | 57 | 46 | +11 | 57 | |
| 10 | Real Sociedad | 38 | 14 | 12 | 12 | 47 | 43 | +4 | 54 | |
| 11 | Real Betis | 38 | 14 | 7 | 17 | 47 | 58 | −11 | 49 | |
| 12 | Valladolid | 38 | 13 | 9 | 16 | 35 | 44 | −9 | 48 | |
| 13 | Atlético Madrid | 38 | 12 | 10 | 16 | 54 | 50 | +4 | 46 | Qualification for the UEFA Cup first round (Note: Since Valencia, winners of 1998–99 Copa del Rey, was qualified for the 1999–2000 UEFA Champions League, losing cup finalists Atlético Madrid earned a spot in the first round of the 1999–2000 UEFA Cup.) |
| 14 | Oviedo | 38 | 11 | 12 | 15 | 41 | 57 | −16 | 45 | |
| 15 | Racing Santander | 38 | 10 | 12 | 16 | 41 | 53 | −12 | 42 | |
| 16 | Alavés | 38 | 11 | 7 | 20 | 36 | 63 | −27 | 40 | |
| 17 | Extremadura (R) | 38 | 9 | 12 | 17 | 27 | 53 | −26 | 39 | Qualification for the relegation playoffs |
| 18 | Villarreal (R) | 38 | 8 | 12 | 18 | 47 | 63 | −16 | 36 | Qualification for the relegation playoffs |
| 19 | Tenerife (R) | 38 | 7 | 13 | 18 | 41 | 63 | −22 | 34 | Relegation to the Segunda División |
| 20 | Salamanca (R) | 38 | 7 | 6 | 25 | 29 | 66 | −37 | 27 | Relegation to the Segunda División |

Source: LFP
Rules for classification: 1) points; 2) head-to-head points; 3) head-to-head goal difference; 4) head-to-head goals scored; 5) goal difference; 6) number of goals scored.
(C) Champions; (R) Relegated

== Results ==
| Home \ Away | ATH | ATM | FCB | BET | CEL | ALV | RCD | ESP | EXT | MLL | RAC | RMA | ROV | RSO | SAL | TEN | VCF | VLD | VIL | ZAR |
|---|---|---|---|---|---|---|---|---|---|---|---|---|---|---|---|---|---|---|---|---|
| Athletic Bilbao | | 1–2 | 1–3 | 0–0 | 0–0 | 5–0 | 2–1 | 2–2 | 0–0 | 1–0 | 2–0 | 2–3 | 3–5 | 0–0 | 1–0 | 2–0 | 2–0 | 2–1 | 2–0 | 2–0 |
| Atlético Madrid | 0–0 | | 1–1 | 2–3 | 2–1 | 3–0 | 1–1 | 1–2 | 5–0 | 1–2 | 1–1 | 3–1 | 0–0 | 4–1 | 2–0 | 2–0 | 1–2 | 6–1 | 2–2 | 0–0 |
| Barcelona | 4–2 | 0–1 | | 4–1 | 2–2 | 7–1 | 4–0 | 3–0 | 1–0 | 2–1 | 3–2 | 3–0 | 3–1 | 4–1 | 1–1 | 4–1 | 2–4 | 1–1 | 1–3 | 3–1 |
| Betis | 1–4 | 0–0 | 0–3 | | 0–3 | 1–0 | 0–3 | 0–1 | 1–1 | 1–3 | 1–1 | 3–2 | 5–0 | 1–0 | 1–0 | 1–0 | 0–1 | 2–0 | 4–1 | 1–3 |
| Celta de Vigo | 3–2 | 0–1 | 0–0 | 4–0 | | 1–1 | 0–0 | 2–0 | 5–1 | 4–2 | 3–0 | 5–1 | 6–2 | 2–2 | 1–0 | 2–0 | 2–2 | 0–0 | 4–1 | 2–0 |
| Alavés | 1–2 | 2–0 | 1–4 | 0–0 | 2–0 | | 2–1 | 1–1 | 0–1 | 2–0 | 0–1 | 1–1 | 2–2 | 2–1 | 1–0 | 3–1 | 0–1 | 2–0 | 2–1 | 1–0 |
| Deportivo La Coruña | 1–1 | 1–1 | 2–1 | 2–2 | 2–1 | 2–2 | | 1–0 | 1–1 | 1–1 | 1–2 | 4–0 | 4–0 | 0–1 | 1–0 | 2–0 | 1–0 | 3–0 | 2–1 | 2–1 |
| Espanyol | 1–1 | 1–1 | 1–2 | 1–0 | 3–0 | 3–0 | 2–2 | | 0–0 | 1–0 | 1–1 | 0–0 | 2–1 | 0–0 | 4–0 | 2–1 | 2–1 | 0–2 | 1–1 | 2–1 |
| Extremadura | 0–1 | 2–1 | 1–2 | 2–1 | 1–1 | 1–0 | 1–2 | 1–0 | | 1–0 | 0–3 | 1–5 | 0–1 | 1–0 | 1–1 | 1–0 | 1–0 | 0–0 | 2–2 | 0–2 |
| Mallorca | 6–1 | 4–0 | 1–0 | 1–0 | 2–0 | 2–1 | 1–2 | 2–0 | 2–0 | | 1–1 | 2–1 | 0–0 | 1–0 | 1–0 | 1–1 | 0–1 | 1–0 | 1–0 | 1–0 |
| Racing Santander | 2–0 | 2–3 | 0–0 | 1–0 | 2–2 | 2–0 | 1–1 | 0–2 | 3–1 | 1–0 | | 1–3 | 0–0 | 0–1 | 4–1 | 0–0 | 0–1 | 0–2 | 1–2 | 2–4 |
| Real Madrid | 0–1 | 4–2 | 2–2 | 0–1 | 1–2 | 3–2 | 3–1 | 2–0 | 2–0 | 2–1 | 2–2 | | 2–1 | 3–2 | 3–1 | 4–0 | 3–1 | 3–2 | 4–1 | 3–2 |
| Oviedo | 0–0 | 3–1 | 2–1 | 0–1 | 1–3 | 1–0 | 1–2 | 1–1 | 1–0 | 1–3 | 1–0 | 1–0 | | 2–1 | 3–2 | 0–1 | 2–2 | 0–0 | 0–0 | 1–2 |
| Real Sociedad | 3–1 | 3–2 | 0–2 | 1–0 | 2–0 | 2–1 | 2–0 | 1–2 | 2–0 | 0–1 | 2–0 | 3–2 | 3–3 | | 4–0 | 1–1 | 1–1 | 1–0 | 1–1 | 0–0 |
| Salamanca | 2–1 | 2–1 | 1–4 | 1–3 | 1–1 | 1–0 | 3–1 | 2–3 | 2–1 | 0–0 | 1–2 | 1–1 | 1–1 | 0–1 | | 1–2 | 0–1 | 1–0 | 1–0 | 1–2 |
| Tenerife | 0–1 | 1–0 | 2–3 | 3–2 | 0–2 | 1–2 | 1–1 | 0–0 | 1–1 | 1–1 | 2–2 | 2–3 | 0–2 | 2–2 | 1–0 | | 3–2 | 2–2 | 2–2 | 1–1 |
| Valencia | 4–1 | 1–0 | 1–3 | 5–1 | 2–2 | 5–0 | 0–0 | 1–2 | 1–1 | 3–0 | 3–0 | 3–1 | 3–0 | 2–0 | 1–0 | 1–1 | | 0–1 | 1–0 | 1–1 |
| Valladolid | 0–3 | 1–0 | 0–1 | 0–3 | 2–1 | 3–0 | 0–1 | 2–1 | 0–0 | 1–0 | 0–0 | 0–1 | 2–1 | 0–0 | 4–1 | 2–1 | 3–1 | | 1–0 | 1–1 |
| Villarreal | 0–1 | 2–1 | 2–3 | 3–4 | 1–1 | 2–0 | 1–2 | 2–2 | 1–1 | 0–2 | 3–0 | 0–2 | 0–0 | 1–1 | 5–0 | 2–5 | 1–0 | 2–1 | | 1–1 |
| Zaragoza | 2–0 | 2–0 | 2–0 | 2–2 | 0–1 | 1–1 | 3–1 | 0–3 | 3–1 | 0–1 | 3–1 | 3–4 | 1–0 | 1–1 | 2–0 | 3–1 | 1–4 | 2–0 | 4–0 | |

Source: LFP (in Spanish)
Legend: Blue = home team win; Yellow = draw; Red = away team win.

== Relegation playoff ==
| Team 1 | Agg. | Team 2 | 1st leg | 2nd leg |
|---|---|---|---|---|
| CF Extremadura | 0–4 | Rayo Vallecano | 0–2 | 0–2 |
| Villarreal CF | 0–3 | Sevilla FC | 0–2 | 0–1 |

=== First leg ===
| 27 June 1999 | CF Extremadura | 0–2 | Rayo Vallecano | Almendralejo |
| 21:00 | | Report (in Spanish) | Luis Cembranos 7'; Llorens 86' (pen.) | Stadium: Francisco de la Hera; Attendance: 9,100; Referee: Eduardo Iturralde González (Basque Country (autonomous community)) |

| 27 June 1999 | Villarreal CF | 0–2 | Sevilla FC | Villarreal |
| 21:00 | | Report (in Spanish) | Tsiartas 2', 45' | Stadium: El Madrigal; Attendance: 17,000; Referee: Víctor Esquinas Torres (Community of Madrid) |

=== Second leg ===
| 30 June 1999 | Rayo Vallecano | 2–0 (4–0 agg.) | CF Extremadura | Madrid |
| 21:30 | Tiago 52'; Bolo 55' | Report (in Spanish) | | Stadium: Vallecas; Attendance: 15,600; Referee: Antonio Jesús López Nieto (Andalusia) |

| 30 June 1999 | Sevilla FC | 1–0 (3–0 agg.) | Villarreal CF | Seville |
| 21:45 | Quevedo 50' | Report (in Spanish) | | Stadium: Ramón Sánchez Pizjuán; Attendance: 48,000; Referee: Manuel Mejuto González (Asturias) |

== Awards ==
=== Pichichi Trophy ===
The Pichichi Trophy is awarded to the player who scores the most goals in a season.

| Rank | Player | Club | Goals |
|---|---|---|---|
| 1 | (Spain) Raúl | Real Madrid | 25 |
| 2 | (Brazil) Rivaldo | Barcelona | 24 |
| 3 | (Argentina) Claudio López | Valencia | 21 |
| 4 | (Spain) Fernando Morientes | Real Madrid | 19 |
| 4 | (Panama) Julio Dely Valdés | Oviedo | 19 |
| 6 | (Federal Republic of Yugoslavia) Savo Milošević | Zaragoza | 17 |
| 7 | (Federal Republic of Yugoslavia) Darko Kovačević | Real Sociedad | 16 |
| 7 | (Spain) Ismael Urzaiz | Athletic Bilbao | 16 |
| 9 | (Netherlands) Patrick Kluivert | Barcelona | 15 |
| 10 | (Argentina) Turu Flores | Deportivo La Coruña | 14 |
| 10 | (Netherlands) Roy Makaay | Tenerife | 14 |
| 10 | (Bulgaria) Lyuboslav Penev | Celta Vigo | 14 |

- Source: Diario AS (newspaper archive, in paper), copy of the day: Monday 21 June 1999

=== Zamora Trophy ===
The Ricardo Zamora Trophy is awarded to the goalkeeper with the lowest ratio of goals conceded to matches played.

| Rank | Player | Club | Goals against | Matches | Average |
|---|---|---|---|---|---|
| 1 | (Argentina) Carlos Roa | Mallorca | 29 | 35 | 0.83 |
| 2 | (Spain) Toni | Espanyol | 38 | 38 | 1 |
| 3 | (Spain) Santiago Cañizares | Valencia | 39 | 38 | 1.03 |
| 4 | (France) Richard Dutruel | Celta Vigo | 39 | 37 | 1.05 |
| 5 | (Cameroon) Jacques Songo'o | Deportivo La Coruña | 40 | 37 | 1.08 |
| 6 | (Spain) César | Valladolid | 42 | 38 | 1.11 |
| 6 | (Spain) Imanol Etxeberria | Athletic Bilbao | 41 | 37 | 1.11 |
| 6 | (Spain) Alberto López | Real Sociedad | 41 | 37 | 1.11 |
| 9 | (Netherlands) Ruud Hesp | Barcelona | 42 | 37 | 1.14 |
| 10 | (Belgium) Ronny Gaspercic | Extremadura | 37 | 31 | 1.19 |

- Source: Diario AS (newspaper archive, in paper), copy of the day: Monday 21 June 1999

=== Fair Play award ===
From this season, RFEF develops and publishes annually the Fair Play classification according to the Points System which was agreed by the board of the federation on 30 October 1998 and later expanded and fixed at another meeting and published in the 2nd Mailshot of the 2000–01 season. The classification for this season was computed from the Second legg, in order to experience results.

| Rank | Club | Points |
|---|---|---|
| 1 | Extremadura | 38 |
| 2 | Mallorca | 45 |
| 3 | Espanyol | 48 |

- Source: Mundo Deportivo (newspaper archive, web)

=== Pedro Zaballa award ===
Atlético Madrid and Valencia supporters

== Attendances ==
| # | Club | Avg. attendance | Highest |
|---|---|---|---|
| 1 | FC Barcelona | 70,263 | 100,000 |
| 2 | Real Madrid | 66,842 | 85,000 |
| 3 | Valencia CF | 46,395 | 53,000 |
| 4 | Atlético de Madrid | 38,579 | 57,000 |
| 5 | Athletic Club | 36,263 | 48,000 |
| 6 | Real Betis | 35,605 | 45,000 |
| 7 | Real Sociedad | 25,518 | 32,000 |
| 8 | Celta de Vigo | 23,995 | 33,000 |
| 9 | Real Zaragoza | 22,211 | 33,000 |
| 10 | RCD Espanyol | 21,947 | 35,100 |
| 11 | Deportivo de La Coruña | 21,684 | 35,000 |
| 12 | CD Tenerife | 18,579 | 22,000 |
| 13 | Racing de Santander | 15,978 | 20,000 |
| 14 | Deportivo Alavés | 15,921 | 19,000 |
| 15 | Real Valladolid | 15,305 | 23,000 |
| 16 | Villarreal CF | 14,658 | 48,000 |
| 17 | RCD Mallorca | 13,702 | 18,982 |
| 18 | Real Oviedo | 11,904 | 20,000 |
| 19 | UD Salamanca | 11,480 | 15,205 |
| 20 | Extremadura CF | 10,342 | 12,500 |

== See also ==
- 1998–99 Segunda División
- 1998–99 Copa del Rey
