= 2000–01 RCD Mallorca season =

Mallorca
2000–01 season
- President: Mateu Alemany
- Head coach: Luis Aragonés
- Stadium: Son Moix
- La Liga: 3rd
- Copa del Rey: Quarter-finals
- UEFA Intertoto Cup: Second round
- Top goalscorer: League: Samuel Eto'o (11); All: Samuel Eto'o (13)
- Biggest win: Mallorca 4–0 Rayo Vallecano
- Biggest defeat: Valencia 4–0 Mallorca
Home colours	Away colours

The 2000–01 season was the 84th season in the existence of RCD Mallorca and the club's fourth consecutive season in the top flight of Spanish football. In addition to the domestic league, Mallorca participated in this season's editions of the Copa del Rey and the UEFA Intertoto Cup. The season covers the period from 1 July 2000 to 30 June 2001.

== Players ==
=== First-team squad ===
Note: Flags indicate national team as defined under FIFA eligibility rules; some limited exceptions apply. Players may hold more than one non-FIFA nationality.

No.	Pos.	Nation	Player
1	GK	ARG	Carlos Roa
2	DF	ESP	Armando Álvarez
3	DF	ESP	Miquel Soler
5	DF	ESP	Fernando Niño
6	DF	ARG	Gustavo Siviero
7	DF	ESP	Lluís Carreras
8	FW	ESP	Carlitos
9	FW	CMR	Samuel Eto'o
10	MF	ARG	Ariel Ibagaza
11	MF	YUG	Jovan Stanković
12	MF	ESP	Alejandro Campano
13	GK	ESP	Miki
14	DF	ESP	Javier Olaizola
15	MF	ESP	Paco Soler

No.	Pos.	Nation	Player
16	DF	ARG	Juan Manuel Viale
17	MF	BRA	Edu Silva
17	FW	NGR	Finidi George
18	MF	ESP	Marcos
19	FW	ESP	Albert Luque
20	DF	ESP	Miguel Ángel Nadal
22	FW	ARG	Leonardo Biagini
23	MF	ESP	Vicente Engonga
25	GK	ARG	Leo Franco
27	FW	ESP	Dani Güiza
28	MF	ESP	Álvaro Novo
30	MF	ESP	Jorge Cordero
32	MF	ESP	Albert Riera

=== Transfers ===
In
Pos.	Name	from	Type
MF	Finidi George	Real Betis	
FW	Ariel López	San Lorenzo	loan ended
MF	Marcos Martín	Mérida	
FW	Josemi	Lleida	
MF	Albert Luque	Málaga	loan ended
GK	Miki	RCD Mallorca B	
MF	Albert Riera	RCD Mallorca B	

Out
Pos.	Name	To	Type
FW	Diego Tristán	Deportivo La Coruña	€17.75m
DF	Lauren	Arsenal	€10.70m
MF	Jovan Stanković	Marseille	€6.86m
FW	Ariel López	Lanús	
DF	Juan José Serrizuela	San Lorenzo	
FW	Jorge Quinteros	San Lorenzo	
FW	Rogério Gaúcho	Santos	
GK	César Gálvez	Elche	
MF	Paco Sanz		Retired
MF	José Luis Martí	Tenerife	released
MF	Ardian Đokaj	Lleida	released
DF	Alejandro Marañón	Cartaya	released
DF	David Castedo	Sevilla	released

== Competitions ==
=== Overview ===
Competition	First match	Last match	Starting round	Final position	Record							
Competition	First match	Last match	Starting round	Final position	Pld	W	D	L	GF	GA	GD	Win %
La Liga	10 September 2000	17 June 2001	Matchday 1	3rd	38	20	11	7	61	43	+18	52.63
Copa del Rey	13 December 2000	7 February 2001	Round of 64	Quarter-finals	6	5	0	1	12	4	+8	83.33
UEFA Intertoto Cup	1 July 2000	8 July 2000	Second round	Second round	2	1	0	1	3	4	−1	50.00
Total					46	26	11	9	76	51	+25	56.52

Last updated: 17 June 2001
Source: Soccerway

=== La Liga ===
==== League table ====
Pos	Team	Pld	W	D	L	GF	GA	GD	Pts	Qualification or relegation
1	Real Madrid (C)	38	24	8	6	81	40	+41	80	Qualification for the Champions League group stage
2	Deportivo La Coruña	38	22	7	9	73	44	+29	73	Qualification for the Champions League group stage
3	Mallorca	38	20	11	7	61	43	+18	71	Qualification for the Champions League third qualifying round
4	Barcelona	38	17	12	9	80	57	+23	63 (Note: VAL 0–1 BAR; BAR 3–2 VAL)	Qualification for the Champions League third qualifying round
5	Valencia	38	18	9	11	55	34	+21	63	Qualification for the UEFA Cup first round

Source: LFP
Rules for classification: 1st points; 2nd head-to-head points; 3rd head-to-head goal difference; 4th head-to-head goals scored; 5th goal difference; 6th number of goals scored; 7th Fair-play points
(C) Champions

==== Results summary ====
Overall								Home						Away					
Pld	W	D	L	GF	GA	GD	Pts	W	D	L	GF	GA	GD	W	D	L	GF	GA	GD
38	20	11	7	61	43	+18	71	14	4	1	38	19	+19	6	7	6	23	24	−1

Last updated: 17 June 2001.
Source: Scoreboard

==== Results by round ====
Round	1	2	3	4	5	6	7	8	9	10	11	12	13	14	15	16	17	18	19	20	21	22	23	24	25	26	27	28	29	30	31	32	33	34	35	36	37	38
Ground	H	A	H	A	H	A	H	A	A	H	A	H	A	H	A	H	A	H	A	A	H	A	H	A	H	A	H	H	A	H	A	H	A	H	A	H	A	H
Result	D	L	L	L	W	D	W	W	W	W	L	W	D	D	D	W	D	W	D	L	D	W	W	L	W	D	W	D	W	W	D	W	L	W	W	W	W	W
Position	12	20	20	20	18	17	13	10	8	5	8	4	6	6	7	5	5	5	5	5	6	6	6	6	5	5	5	5	5	4	4	4	4	4	4	3	3	3

Updated to match(es) played on 17 June 2001. Source: Competitive Matches
A = Away; H = Home; W = Win; D = Draw; L = Loss; = 2001-02 UEFA Champions League group stage; = 2001-02 UEFA Champions League qualifying round; = 2001-02 UEFA Cup; = 2001-02 Segunda Division

==== Matches ====
10 September 2000 1	Mallorca	1–1	Valladolid	Palma
				Stadium: Estadi de Son Moix

16 September 2000 2	Valencia	4–0	Mallorca	Valencia
				Stadium: Mestalla

24 September 2000 3	Mallorca	0–1	Málaga	Palma
				Stadium: Estadi de Son Moix

1 October 2000 4	Athletic Bilbao	2–1	Mallorca	Bilbao
				Stadium: San Mamés

15 October 2000 5	Mallorca	2–1	Racing Santander	Palma
				Stadium: Estadi de Son Moix

21 October 2000 6	Deportivo La Coruña	1–1	Mallorca	A Coruña
				Stadium: Riazor

28 October 2000 7	Mallorca	2–0	Barcelona	Palma
				Stadium: Estadi de Son Moix

1 November 2000 8	Real Madrid	0–2	Mallorca	Madrid
				Stadium: Santiago Bernabéu

5 November 2000 9	Real Sociedad	0–1	Mallorca	San Sebastián
				Stadium: Anoeta

12 November 2000 10	Mallorca	2–1	Numancia	Palma
				Stadium: Estadi de Son Moix

18 November 2000 11	Las Palmas	1–0	Mallorca	Las Palmas
				Stadium: Estadio Insular

25 November 2000 12	Mallorca	2–1	Villarreal	Palma
				Stadium: Estadi de Son Moix

3 December 2000 13	Zaragoza	1–1	Mallorca	Zaragoza
				Stadium: La Romareda

10 December 2000 14	Mallorca	1–1	Osasuna	Palma
				Stadium: Estadi de Son Moix

17 December 2000 15	Celta Vigo	2–2	Mallorca	Vigo
				Stadium: Balaídos

20 December 2000 16	Mallorca	3–2	Espanyol	Palma
				Stadium: Estadi de Son Moix

7 January 2001 17	Rayo Vallecano	2–2	Mallorca	Madrid
				Stadium: Vallecas

14 January 2001 18	Mallorca	4–3	Alavés	Palma
				Stadium: Estadi de Son Moix

21 January 2001 19	Oviedo	1–1	Mallorca	Oviedo
				Stadium: Carlos Tartiere

28 January 2001 20	Valladolid	2–0	Mallorca	Valladolid
				Stadium: José Zorrilla

4 February 2001 21	Mallorca	2–2	Valencia	Palma
				Stadium: Estadi de Son Moix

11 February 2001 22	Málaga	0–1	Mallorca	Málaga
				Stadium: La Rosaleda

18 February 2001 23	Mallorca	1–0	Athletic Bilbao	Palma
				Stadium: Estadi de Son Moix

25 February 2001 24	Racing Santander	2–1	Mallorca	Santander

4 March 2001 25	Mallorca	2–1	Deportivo La Coruña	Palma
				Stadium: Estadi de Son Moix

11 March 2001 26	Barcelona	1–1	Mallorca	Barcelona
				Stadium: Camp Nou

18 March 2001 27	Mallorca	1–0	Real Madrid	Palma
				Stadium: Estadi de Son Moix

1 April 2001 28	Mallorca	1–1	Real Sociedad	Palma
				Stadium: Estadi de Son Moix

8 April 2001 29	Numancia	0–2	Mallorca	Soria

15 April 2001 30	Mallorca	2–1	Las Palmas	Palma
				Stadium: Estadi de Son Moix

22 April 2001 31	Villarreal	2–2	Mallorca	Villarreal
				Stadium: Estadio El Madrigal

29 April 2001 32	Mallorca	2–1	Zaragoza	Palma
				Stadium: Estadi de Son Moix

6 May 2001 33	Osasuna	1–0	Mallorca	Pamplona

13 May 2001 34	Mallorca	2–0	Celta Vigo	Palma
				Stadium: Estadi de Son Moix

20 May 2001 35	Espanyol	0–1	Mallorca	Barcelona

27 May 2001 36	Mallorca	4–0	Rayo Vallecano	Palma
				Stadium: Estadi de Son Moix

10 June 2001 37	Alavés	2–4	Mallorca	Vitoria-Gasteiz

17 June 2001 38	Mallorca	4–2	Oviedo	Palma
				Stadium: Estadi de Son Moix

=== Copa del Rey ===
13 December 2000 Round of 64	Figueres	0–2	Mallorca	Figueres
21:15		Report	Carreras 25'; Luque 52'	Stadium: Municipal de Vilatenim; Referee: Juan Fernández Marin

3 January 2001 Round of 32	Xerez	0–3	Mallorca	Jerez de la Frontera
20:00			Eto'o 67'; Carlitos 89'; George 90'	Stadium: Chapín; Attendance: 11,000; Referee: Carlos Megía Dávila

==== Eightfinals ====
10 January 2001 1	Tenerife	0–2	Mallorca	Santa Cruz de Tenerife
22:00		Report	Basavilbaso 19' (o.g.); Eto'o 29'	Stadium: Heliodoro Rodríguez López; Attendance: 10,000; Referee: Arturo Daudén Ibáñez

17 January 2001 2	Mallorca	2–0 (4–0 agg.)	Tenerife	Palma
21:00	Carlitos 39', 69'	Report		Stadium: Estadi de Son Moix; Referee: Miguel Pérez Lasa

==== Quarterfinals ====
31 January 2001 1	Celta Vigo	3–1	Mallorca	Vigo
20:15	López 51' (pen.), 69'; Cáceres 77'	Report	George 15'	Stadium: Balaídos; Attendance: 15,000; Referee: Antonio López Nieto

7 February 2001 2	Mallorca	2–1 (3–4 agg.)	Celta Vigo	Palma
20:00	Nadal 45'; Engonga 85' (pen.)	Report	Catanha 74'	Stadium: Estadi de Son Moix; Attendance: 20,000; Referee: Eduardo Iturralde González

=== UEFA Intertoto Cup ===
==== Second round ====
1 July 2000 First leg	Mallorca (Spain)	2–1	(Romania) Ceahlăul Piatra Neamț	Palma, Spain
21:00	Pelegrín 2'; Güiza 37'	Report	Perjă 26'	Stadium: Estadi de Son Moix; Attendance: 3,860; Referee: Franz-Xaver Wack (Germany)

8 July 2000 Second leg	Ceahlăul Piatra Neamț (Romania)	3–1 (4–3 agg.)	(Spain) Mallorca	Piatra Neamț, Romania
16:00	Grozavu 22'; Hrib 54'; Axinia 85'	Report	Güiza 9'	Stadium: Stadionul Ceahlăul; Attendance: 1,300; Referee: Manfred Schüttengruber (Austria)

== Statistics ==
=== Players statistics ===
No.	Pos	Nat	Player	Total		La Liga		Copa del Rey		Intertoto	
No.	Pos	Nat	Player	Apps	Goals	Apps	Goals	Apps	Goals	Apps	Goals
25	GK	(Argentina) ARG	Leo Franco	32	-31	27	-27	5	-4		
14	DF	(Spain) ESP	Javier Olaizola	40	1	36	1	4	0		
20	DF	(Spain) ESP	Miguel Ángel Nadal	41	4	36	3	5	1		
5	DF	(Spain) ESP	Fernando Niño	35	1	31	1	4	0		
3	DF	(Spain) ESP	Miquel Soler	39	0	35	0	4	0		
17	MF	(Nigeria) NGR	Finidi George	35	7	29+2	5	4	2		
23	MF	(Spain) ESP	Vicente Engonga	35	3	31	2	4	1		
18	MF	(Spain) ESP	Marcos	38	4	31+2	4	5	0		
10	MF	(Argentina) ARG	Ariel Ibagaza	36	10	33+1	10	2	0		
19	FW	(Spain) ESP	Luque	36	10	32	9	3+1	1		
9	FW	(Cameroon) CMR	Samuel Eto'o	33	13	25+3	11	5	2		
13	GK	(Spain) ESP	Miki	9	-11	5+2	-7	0	0	2	-4
7	DF	(Spain) ESP	Lluís Carreras	20	3	13+3	2	3+1	1		
28	MF	(Spain) ESP	Novo	40	3	12+22	3	3+1	0	2	0
6	DF	(Argentina) ARG	Gustavo Siviero	16	1	8+5	1	2+1	0		
15	MF	(Spain) ESP	Paco Soler	26	0	7+15	0	2+2	0		
8	FW	(Spain) ESP	Carlitos	25	7	6+16	4	2+1	3		
11	MF	(Federal Republic of Yugoslavia) YUG	Jovan Stanković	18	0	6+8	0	4	0		
22	FW	(Argentina) ARG	Leonardo Biagini	17	1	4+9	1	1+3	0		
1	GK	(Argentina) ARG	Carlos Roa	4	-8	4	-8				
2	DF	(Spain) ESP	Armando	20	0	3+11	0	3+3	0		
1	GK	(Argentina) ARG	German Burgos	3	-1	2	-1	1	0		
27	FW	(Spain) ESP	Dani Güiza	7	3	1+4	1	0	0	2	2
27	FW	(Spain) ESP	Josemi	5	1	1+4	1				
30	MF	(Spain) ESP	Cordero	3	0	1	0	0	0	2	0
26	MF	(Spain) ESP	Julián Robles	6	0	0+3	0	0+1	0	2	0
32	MF	(Spain) ESP	Albert Riera	3	1	0+3	1				
29	MF	(Spain) ESP	Romerito	2	0	0	0	0	0	2	0
6	MF	(Spain) ESP	Buades	1	0	0	0	0	0	1	0
12	MF	(Spain) ESP	Campano	2	0	0	0	0	0	1+1	0
16	DF	(Argentina) ARG	Viale	2	0	0	0	0	0	1+1	0
22	MF	(Spain) ESP	Marañon	1	0	0	0	0	0	1	0
10	FW	(Spain) ESP	Perera	1	0	0	0	0	0	1	0
24	FW	(Spain) ESP	Ramon	1	0	0	0	0	0	1	0
17	MF	(Peru) PER	Merino	2	0	0	0	0	0	0+2	0
3	DF	(Spain) ESP	Rubiales	2	0	0	0	0	0	2	0
5	DF	(Spain) ESP	Pelegrín	2	1	0	0	0	0	2	1

- Source: https://www.bdfutbol.com/en/t/t2000-0124.html
