= El Portil and Nuevo Portil =

- Residential Area
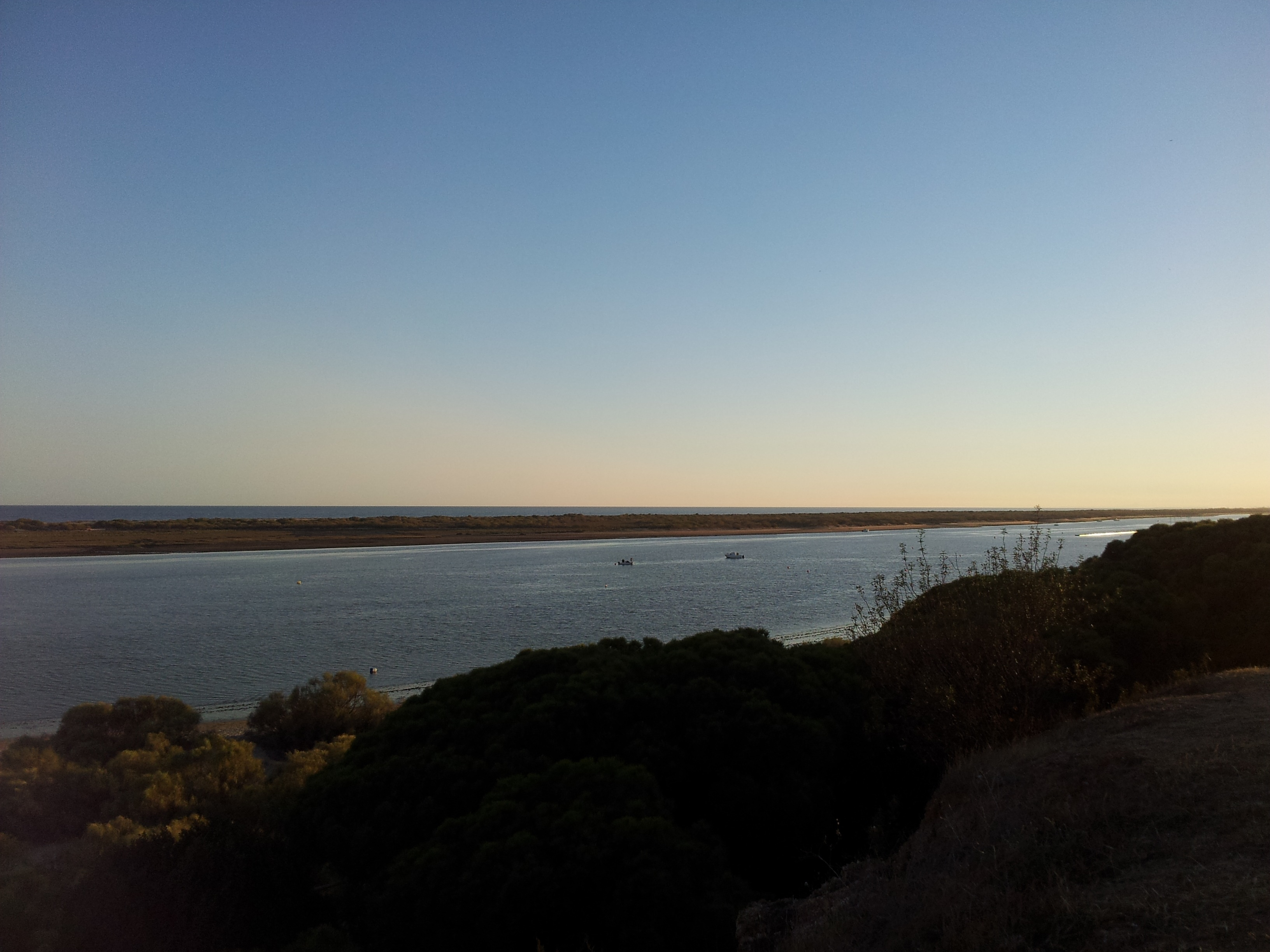
- El Rompido Arrow
- Interactive map of El Portil and Nuevo Portil
- Location in Spain
- Coordinates: 37°12′08″N 7°06′00″W
- Country: Spain
- Province: Huelva
- Comarca: Andalusia

Population (2016)
  - Total: Summer: 28,000 inhabitants Rest of the year: 2,400 inhabitants
- Demonym: Portileño/a
- Time zone: CET
  - Summer (DST): CEST
- Postal code: 21459

El Portil and Nuevo Portil are two coastal population units separated by one street, known as Laguna Seca street, and managed by two municipalities, in the Province of Huelva, autonomous community of Andalusia, in southern Spain. People differentiates on which side of the street they are using El Portil or Nuevo Portil as if it were the name of districts of the same town. El Portil is managed by the municipality of Punta Umbría whereas Nuevo Portil is managed by the Cartaya municipality. The stable population, in winter, is about 2400 inhabitants about (1122 in Nuevo Portil and 1027 in El Portil) in 2016, while in the Summer season, is around 28.000. Most of them, tourists from the provinces of Huelva, Seville, Badajoz, Madrid and even the Basque Country and Galicia. People from other countries prefer to visit El Portil and Nuevo Portil in Autumn, Winter and Spring seasons.

Located parallel to the end zone of the Flecha de El Rompido, the main economic activity is tourism. El Portil and Nuevo Portil share a beach of 4 km long and 40–60 meters wide as an average. Further inland is the Laguna del Portil lake of great environmental value.

El Portil and Nuevo Portil, since its inception as an Area of Touristic Interest, has always had a considerable number of tourists, mainly Spanish, but also many foreigners. Foreign tourists most seen by these streets come from United Kingdom and France and Italy.

== History ==
It was declared Center of National Tourist Interest (CNTI) in 1963. Initially the core of El Portil was the newly created urban environment. The area was known at that time as "Monte común de Abajo". Later, close to the 90's, the municipality of Cartaya decided to boost the tourism, previously started by the Punta Umbria's municipality, and created the population unit of Nuevo Portil. Previously, Punta Umbría was segregated from Cartaya on April 26, 1963, then starting then the growth of the population unit of El Portil. As it was said, El Portil and Nuevo Portil share the same physical populated area with tho administrative municipalities, -or two districts or population units-, because of the segregation.

== Beaches and Nature ==
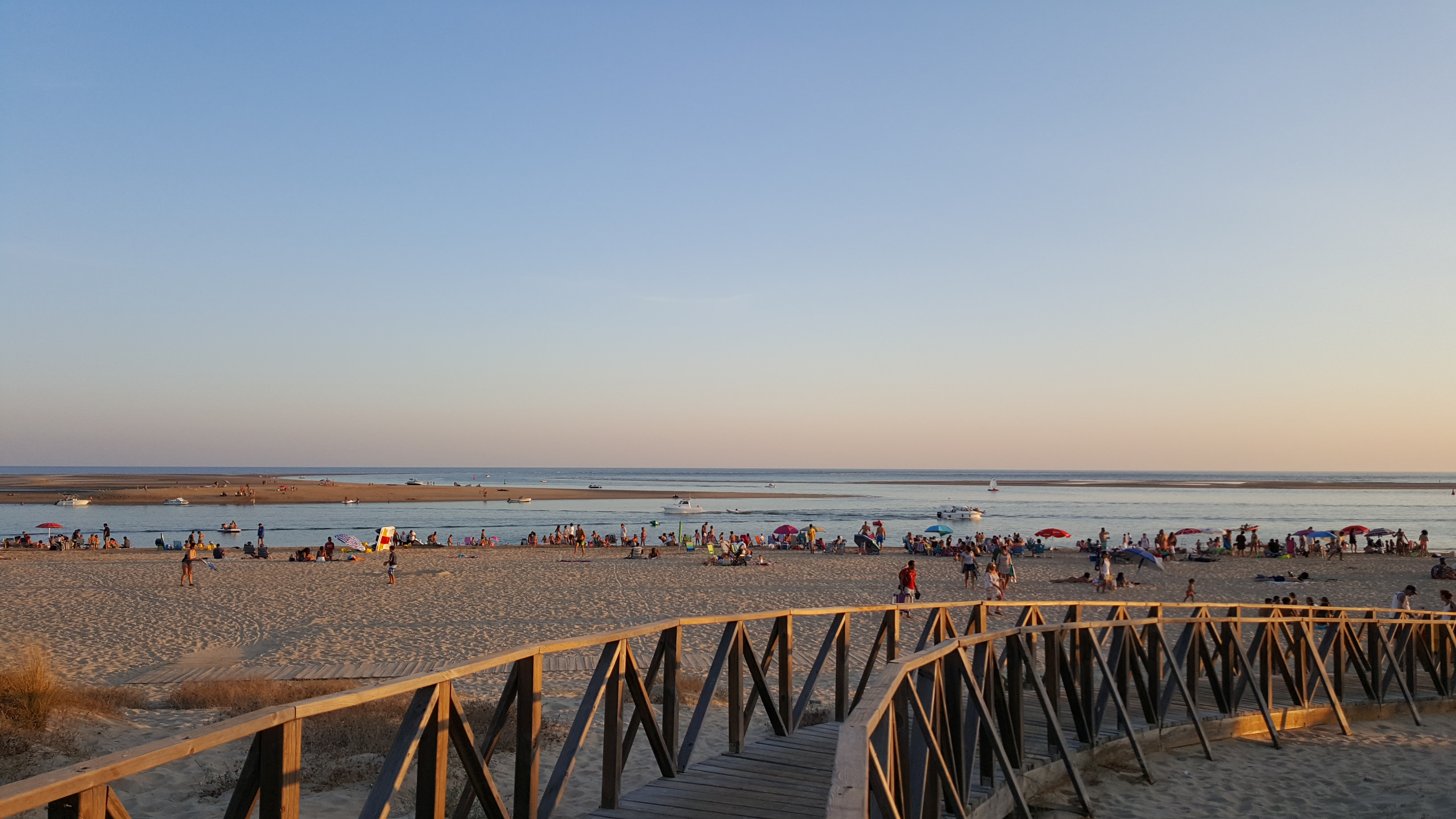
El Portil beach at twilight

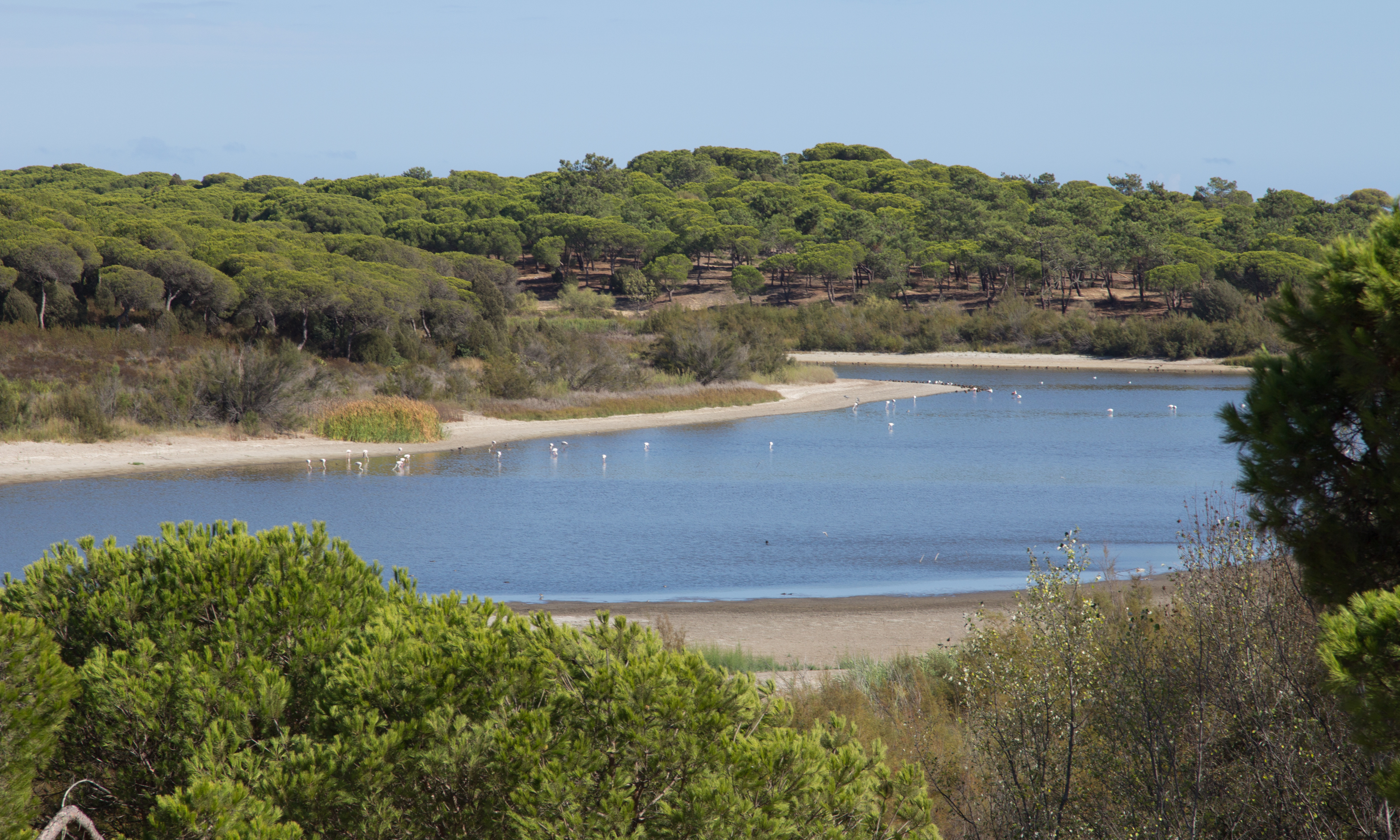
Lagoon of El Portil

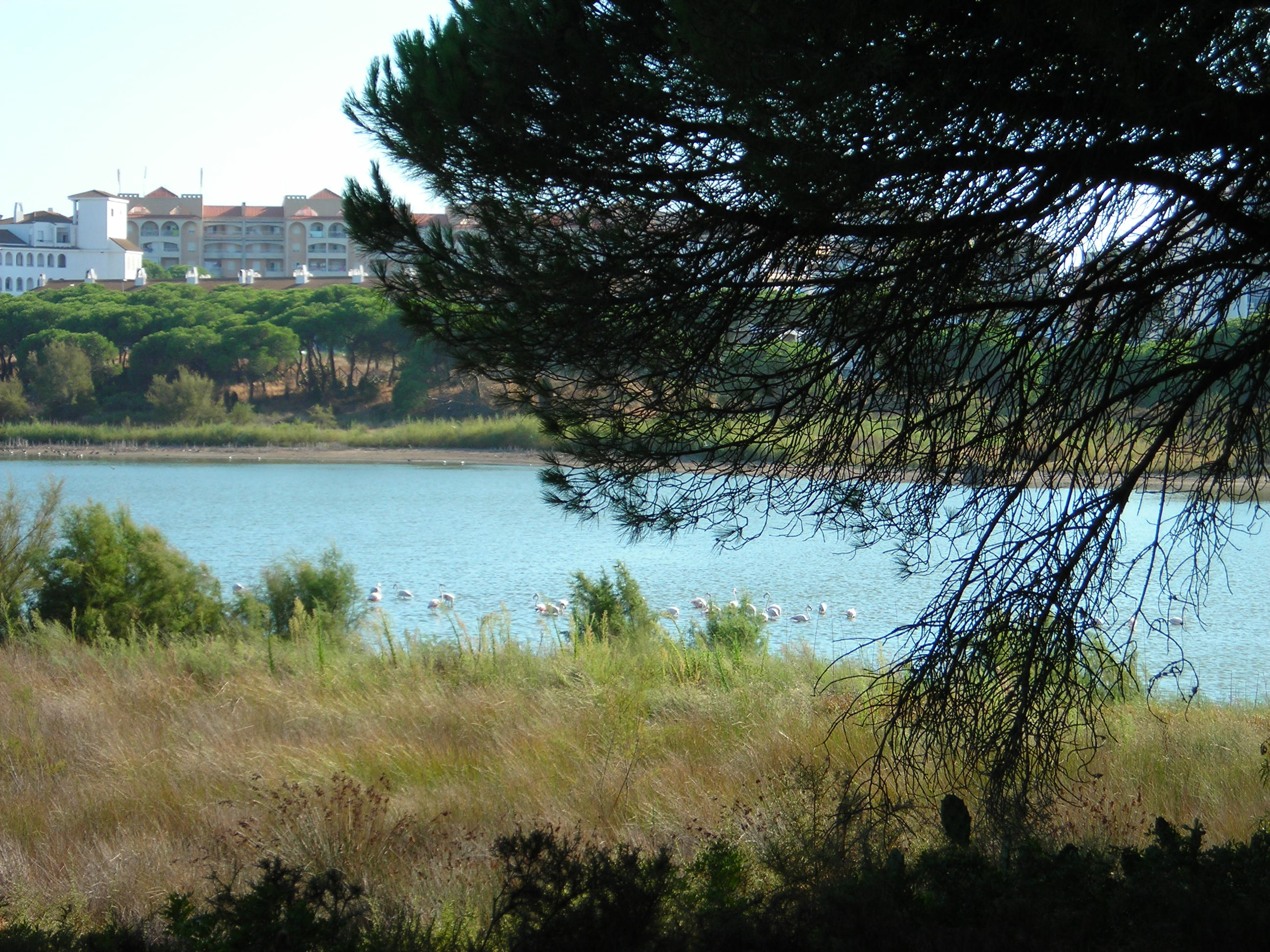
Flamingos at Laguna de El Portil

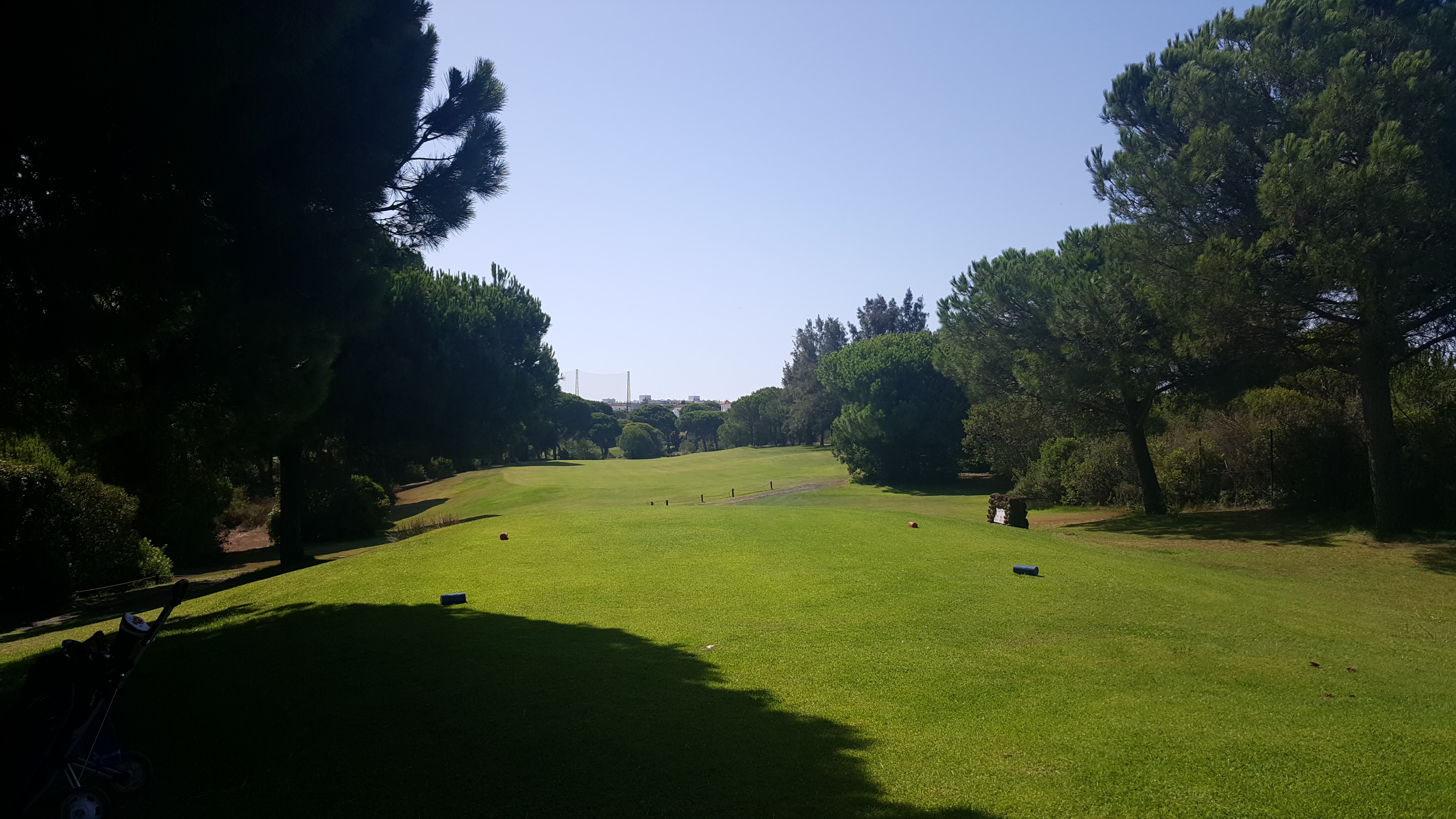
Nuevo Portil golf course

The beach of El Portil and Nuevo Portil is a golden sand beach located in the Costa de la Luz, shared by two municipalities, that of Cartaya and Punta Umbría. The beach of El Portil and Nuevo Portil extends over 4 kilometers of golden sand, variable width depending on the tides. It has been awarded the Blue Flag and the usual state of the sea is calm waters.

Fine golden sand coincides with the end point of the mouth of the Piedras River and part of it is situated opposite the Flecha de El Rompido, which grows around eighty meters annually. Near it is the lagoon of the same name is listed as protected space. Bordered on the east with the Playa de La Bota. Most of the beach is urbanized and with easy access, even for handicapped at certain places.

During World War II the government of Francisco Franco bunkers built in anticipation of a possible Allied invasion by the Huelva coast, close to the Guadalquivir river mouth, located 30 km from el Portil and Nuevo Portil. You can still find traces of them at that place.

This is the reason why the body of a "fake" Major William Martin, central act of Operation Mincemeat was dropped out by the British Secret Service on April 30, 1943 on the El Portil beach. Even there is a grave on the Huelva cemetery where is buried the anonymous homeless used for the hoax.

In El Portil there are natural protected zones known as Los Enebrales and the Laguna de El Portil.

== Urban, social and sport aspects ==
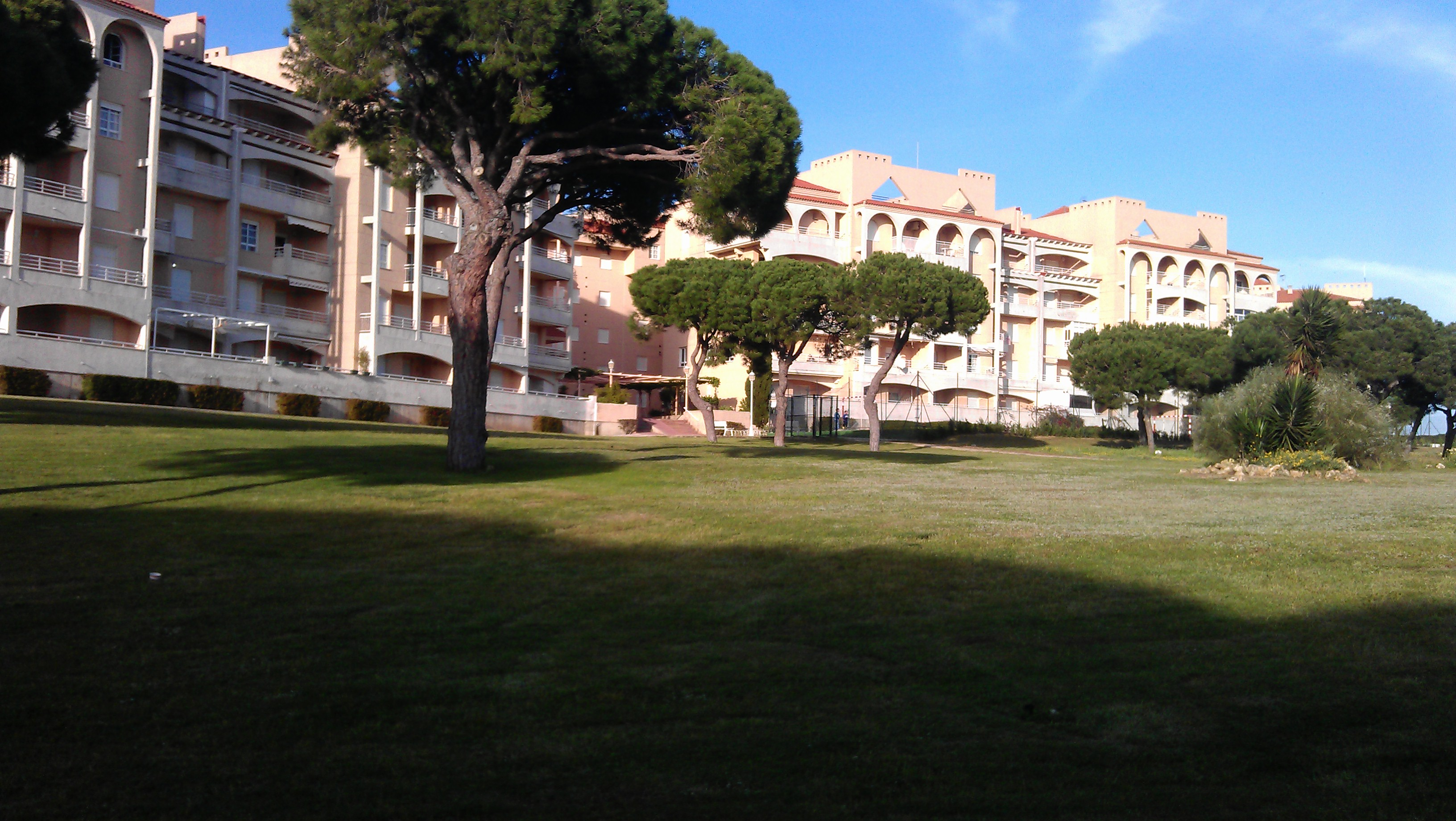
Playas del Sur

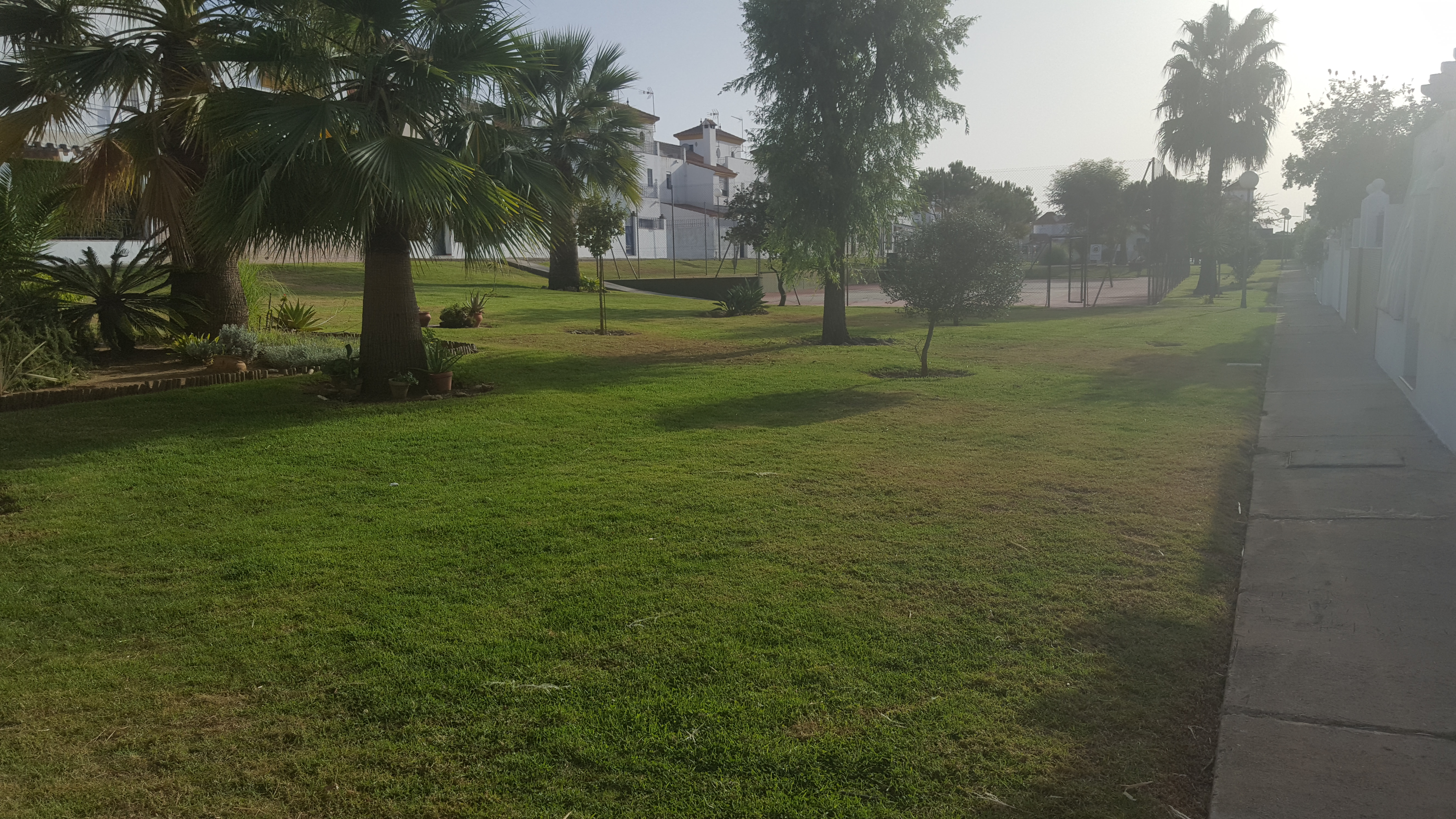
Urbanización Entrepinos

In the Punta Umbría district, there is a public sports center with numerous facilities: two football courts, a basketball court, tennis courts, paddle courts and a gym well equipped.

In the Cartaya's district there are public tennis and soccer field from "albero", not grass, and several medium banks. Albero is the Spanish word for the same compressed colored sand as in the bullfighting arena.

Life in El Portil and Nuevo Portil is relaxed despite the differences. El Portil seems more urban, despite its location and landscapes, because is where most of the shopping an leisure places are. Nuevo Portil is closer to a country side way of living. Less shopping, bars and restaurants mean silent places. The population is spread through communities/condominiums of different types and sizes. Among the largest communities are Entrepinos Urbanization located in Nuevo Portil, and Playas del Sur or Puntamar in El Portil. These names are useful to be oriented there. Also as differentiating aspects, accommodation is mainly in condominiums of flats and apartments in the El Portil district whereas is of cottages and villas in the Nuevo Portil district. There is a healthy competition among the citizens of both districts because there are differences, but in fact is the same area with the same climate, sea, light, and even kind and welcoming citizens with very small details such as if the sand of the district beach is more fine grained sandy or more clayish, or if the district is more or less noisy or if the citizens have to walk less to reach the beach because they are closer, or even because they have the cheaper restaurants and Bars. That is something that the visitor has to know to understand how El Portii and Nuevo Portil works socially and invites to investigate how the environment looks like using Google to choose the preferred accommodation.

The fair of El Portil and Nuevo Portil is scheduled for mid-August and is organized by the City of Punta Umbria and Cartaya. Although it has not always been very prominent, in recent years, it is gaining importance and is demonstrating every year that more people like these events. Also at the night of San Juan in the early hours from 23 to 24 June is celebrated on the beach,

== Health and transportation ==
The area has a public health center (in the administrative area of Punta Umbría), that is El Portil, and two pharmacies, one nearby health center and the other about 300 m away, in the administrative area of Cartaya, that is Nuevo Portil. If the emergency is too severe, it would be advisable to go to Huelva and go to the Juan Ramón Jiménez Hospital, which is a large and much more enabled emergency room. Although this indication to go to Huelva always have to be given by the doctor first.
