= NVO (disambiguation) =

NVO or Nvo may refer to:

- National Virtual Observatory, conceived to allow scientists to access data from multiple astronomical observatories
- nvo, the ISO 639-3 code for Nyokon language
- Nezavisimoye Voyennoye Obozreniye, a Russian weekly newspaper
- La Nouvelle Vie Ouvrière, a French trade union magazine
- Novo Nordisk, the NYSE code NVO
- Nvō or Nabu, the ancient Mesopotamian patron god of literacy

== People ==
- José Luis Ebatela Nvo, an Equatoguinean middle-distance runner
- Camilo Nvo, a retired Equatoguinean footballer
