= Alejandro Marañón =

Spanish footballer (born 1980)

Personal information
- Full name: Alejandro Marañón Pérez
- Date of birth: 15 May 1980 (age 46)
- Place of birth: Cartaya, Spain
- Height: 1.80 m (5 ft 11 in)
- Position: Left-back

Youth career
- 1992–1994: Cartaya
- 1994–1997: Olimpic Onubense
- 1997–1998: Ayamonte
- 1998–1999: Sevilla

Senior career*
Years	Team	Apps	(Gls)
1999–2001	Cartaya	37	(2)
2001	Mallorca B		
2001–2003	Sevilla B	55	(0)
2003–2004	Sevilla	6	(0)
2004–2009	Murcia	68	(1)
Total		166+	(3+)
- * Club domestic league appearances and goals

Alejandro Marañón Pérez (born 15 May 1980) is a Spanish former professional footballer who played mainly as a left-back.

== Club career ==
Born in Cartaya, Province of Huelva, Marañón arrived at Sevilla FC at the age of 21, going on to spend two full seasons with their reserves. On 23 November 2003, he made his first appearance for the first team, playing the entire 1–0 away loss against RCD Espanyol; he took part in another five La Liga matches, notably a 5–1 defeat at Real Madrid.

Marañón joined Real Murcia CF in summer 2004, being an important defensive unit in his first two seasons, spent in the Segunda División. However, he featured little as the club returned to the top flight in 2007 and even less the following campaign, being released in July 2009.
