= 2003 Copa del Rey final =

- Event: 2002–03 Copa del Rey
Recreativo	Mallorca
0	3
- Date: 28 June 2003
- Venue: Estadio Martínez Valero, Elche
- Referee: Eduardo Iturralde González
- Attendance: 39,000

The 2003 Copa del Rey final was the 101st final since its establishment. The match took place on 28 June 2003 at the Estadio Martínez Valero in Elche. The match was contested by RCD Mallorca and Recreativo de Huelva, and it was refereed by Eduardo Iturralde González. RCD Mallorca lifted the trophy for the first time in their history with a 3-0 victory over Recreativo de Huelva.

== Match details ==
28 June 2003
21:00 CEST

Recreativo	0–3	Mallorca
	Report 1 Report 2	Pandiani 21' (pen.); Eto'o 72', 84'

Martínez Valero, Elche
Attendance: 39.000
Referee: Eduardo Iturralde González

Recreativo de Huelva	RCD Mallorca

GK	1	(Spain) José Antonio Luque
DF	22	(Spain) Javi García
DF	6	(Spain) Juan Merino (c)	(yellow card) 29'	(substituted off) 69'
DF	14	(Spain) Loren	(yellow card) 20'
DF	20	(Venezuela) Álex Pereira	(yellow card) 65'
DF	12	(Argentina) Mariano Pernía
MF	15	(Spain) Emilio Viqueira
MF	19	(Spain) Diego Camacho
MF	10	(Spain) Ignacio Benítez		(substituted off) 77'
MF	16	(Spain) Mario Bermejo		(substituted off) 41'
FW	11	(Spain) Raúl Molina
Substitutes:
GK	13	(Spain) César Quesada
DF	2	(Spain) Miguel Ángel Espínola
MF	21	(Spain) Xisco		(substituted on) 41'
MF	3	(Spain) Óscar Arpón		(substituted on) 69'
FW	23	(Brazil) Joãozinho		(substituted on) 77'
Manager:
(Spain) Lucas Alcaraz

GK	25	(Argentina) Leo Franco
DF	8	(Spain) David Cortés
DF	20	(Spain) Miguel Ángel Nadal (c)
DF	5	(Spain) Fernando Niño	(yellow card) 77'
DF	16	(Spain) Poli
MF	21	(Spain) Álvaro Novo
MF	22	(Colombia) Harold Lozano	(yellow card) 52'
MF	11	(Spain) Albert Riera
MF	10	(Argentina) Ariel Ibagaza		(substituted off) 85'
FW	9	(Cameroon) Samuel Eto'o		(substituted off) 87'
FW	12	(Uruguay) Walter Pandiani	(yellow card) 65'	(substituted off) 81'
Substitutes
GK	13	(Spain) Miki
DF	24	(Argentina) Federico Lussenhoff
MF	2	(Spain) Alejandro Campano		(substituted on) 87'
MF	18	(Spain) Marcos		(substituted on) 85'
FW	7	(Spain) Carlitos		(substituted on) 81'
Manager:
(Spain) Gregorio Manzano
