= Loren Morón =

Loren Morón may refer to:

- Loren Morón (footballer, born 1970), Spanish football manager and former defender
- Loren Morón (footballer, born 1993), Spanish football striker
