= AD Cartaya =

Spanish football team

Cartaya
- Full name: Agrupación Deportiva Cartaya
- Founded: 1956
- Ground: Nuevo Luís Rodríguez Salvador, Cartaya, Spain
- Capacity: 3,072
- President: Domingo Martín
- Manager: Manuel Limón
- League: División de Honor – Group 1
- 2024–25: Tercera Federación – Group 10, 15th of 18 (relegated)
Home colours	Away colours

Agrupación Deportiva Cartaya is a football team based in Cartaya. Founded in 1956, the team plays in División de Honor – Group 1, holding home matches at the Nuevo Luís Rodríguez Salvador.

== History ==
In 1956, AD Cartaya were formed by Ayamonte native José Díaz Luna. Prior to AD Cartaya's formation, a number of clubs, notably Juventud and UD Cartaya, had represented the town. At the end of the 1980s, following the death of club president Luis Rodríguez Salvador, Cartaya suffered financial difficulties. In 1999, Cartaya achieved promotion to the Tercera División under the management of Juan Palma. After the 2009–10 season, they were relegated two divisions, from Tercera División to Regional Preferente, due to the club's economic limitations. In 2021, Cartaya won the División de Honor Andaluza, gaining promotion to the Tercera División RFEF.

== Ground ==
In 2005, Cartaya moved to the Estadio Luis Rodríguez Salvador. In March 2016, the Estadio Luis Rodríguez Salvador hosted three games for the 2016 UEFA European Under-19 Championship qualification stages.

== Season to season ==
Season	Tier	Division	Place	Copa del Rey
1958–59	4	1ª Reg.	7th	
1959–60	4	1ª Reg.	10th	
1960–61	4	1ª Reg.	1st	
1961–62	4	1ª Reg.		
1962–63	4	1ª Reg.	4th	
1963–64	4	1ª Reg.	3rd	
1964–65	4	1ª Reg.	(R)	
1965–66	4	1ª Reg.	8th	
1966–67	4	1ª Reg.	3rd	
1967–68	4	1ª Reg.	4th	
1968–69	4	1ª Reg.	8th	
1969–70	5	2ª Reg.	8th	
1970–71	DNP			
1971–72	5	2ª Reg.	4th	
1972–73	5	2ª Reg.	5th	
1973–74	5	2ª Reg.	5th	
1974–75	5	2ª Reg.	9th	
1975–76	6	2ª Reg.	13th	
1976–77	6	2ª Reg.	1st	
1977–78	7	2ª Reg.	1st	

Season	Tier	Division	Place	Copa del Rey
1978–79	6	1ª Reg.	12th	
1979–80	6	1ª Reg.	12th	
1980–81	6	1ª Reg.	5th	
1981–82	6	1ª Reg.	1st	
1982–83	5	Reg. Pref.	18th	
1983–84	5	Reg. Pref.	8th	
1984–85	5	Reg. Pref.	8th	
1985–86	5	Reg. Pref.	9th	
1986–87	5	Reg. Pref.	6th	
1987–88	5	Reg. Pref.	7th	
1988–89	5	Reg. Pref.	10th	
1989–90	5	Reg. Pref.	9th	
1990–91	5	Reg. Pref.	9th	
1991–92	5	Reg. Pref.	16th	
1992–93	6	1ª Reg.	1st	
1993–94	5	Reg. Pref.	8th	
1994–95	5	Reg. Pref.	7th	
1995–96	5	Reg. Pref.	6th	
1996–97	5	Reg. Pref.	1st	
1997–98	5	Reg. Pref.	3rd	

Season	Tier	Division	Place	Copa del Rey
1998–99	5	Reg. Pref.	1st	
1999–2000	4	3ª	14th	
2000–01	4	3ª	15th	
2001–02	4	3ª	14th	
2002–03	4	3ª	9th	
2003–04	4	3ª	15th	
2004–05	4	3ª	21st	
2005–06	5	1ª And.	2nd	
2006–07	5	1ª And.	1st	
2007–08	4	3ª	17th	
2008–09	4	3ª	12th	
2009–10	4	3ª	20th	
2010–11	6	Reg. Pref.	10th	
2011–12	6	Reg. Pref.	6th	
2012–13	6	Reg. Pref.	5th	
2013–14	6	Reg. Pref.	8th	
2014–15	6	2ª And.	2nd	
2015–16	5	1ª And.	4th	
2016–17	5	Div. Hon.	11th	
2017–18	5	Div. Hon.	14th	

Season	Tier	Division	Place	Copa del Rey
2018–19	5	Div. Hon.	8th	
2019–20	5	Div. Hon.	9th	
2020–21	5	Div. Hon.	1st	
2021–22	5	3ª RFEF	14th	
2022–23	5	3ª Fed.	14th	
2023–24	5	3ª Fed.	9th	
2024–25	5	3ª Fed.	15th	
2025–26	6	Div. Hon.		

- 9 seasons in Tercera División
- 4 seasons in Tercera Federación/Tercera División RFEF

== Notable former players ==
- (Equatorial Guinea) Camilo Nvo
- (Spain) Alejandro Marañón
