= Costa de la Luz =

Section of the Andalusian coast in Spain

Coordinates: 36°15′N 5°58′W

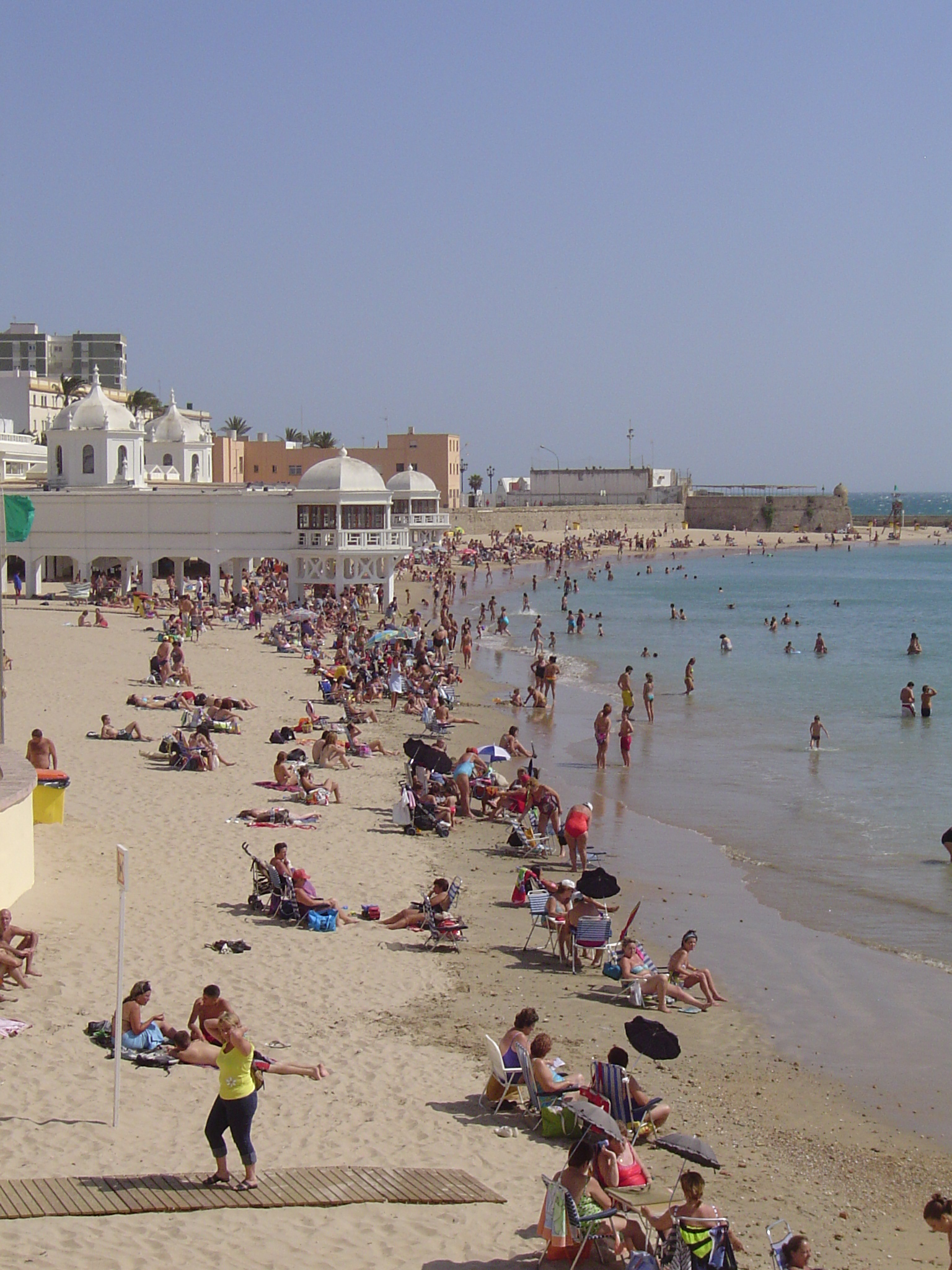
La Caleta beach, Cádiz

The Costa de la Luz (Spanish pronunciation: [ˈkosta ðe la luθ], "Coast of Light") is a section of the Andalusian coast in Spain facing the Atlantic. It extends from Tarifa in the south, along the coasts of the Province of Cádiz and the Province of Huelva, to the mouth of the Guadiana River.

A holiday destination for vacationing Spaniards, in recent years the Costa de la Luz has seen more foreign visitors, especially from France, Germany, and the UK. Increasing urbanization and tourism-oriented development of parts of the coast have had economic benefits.

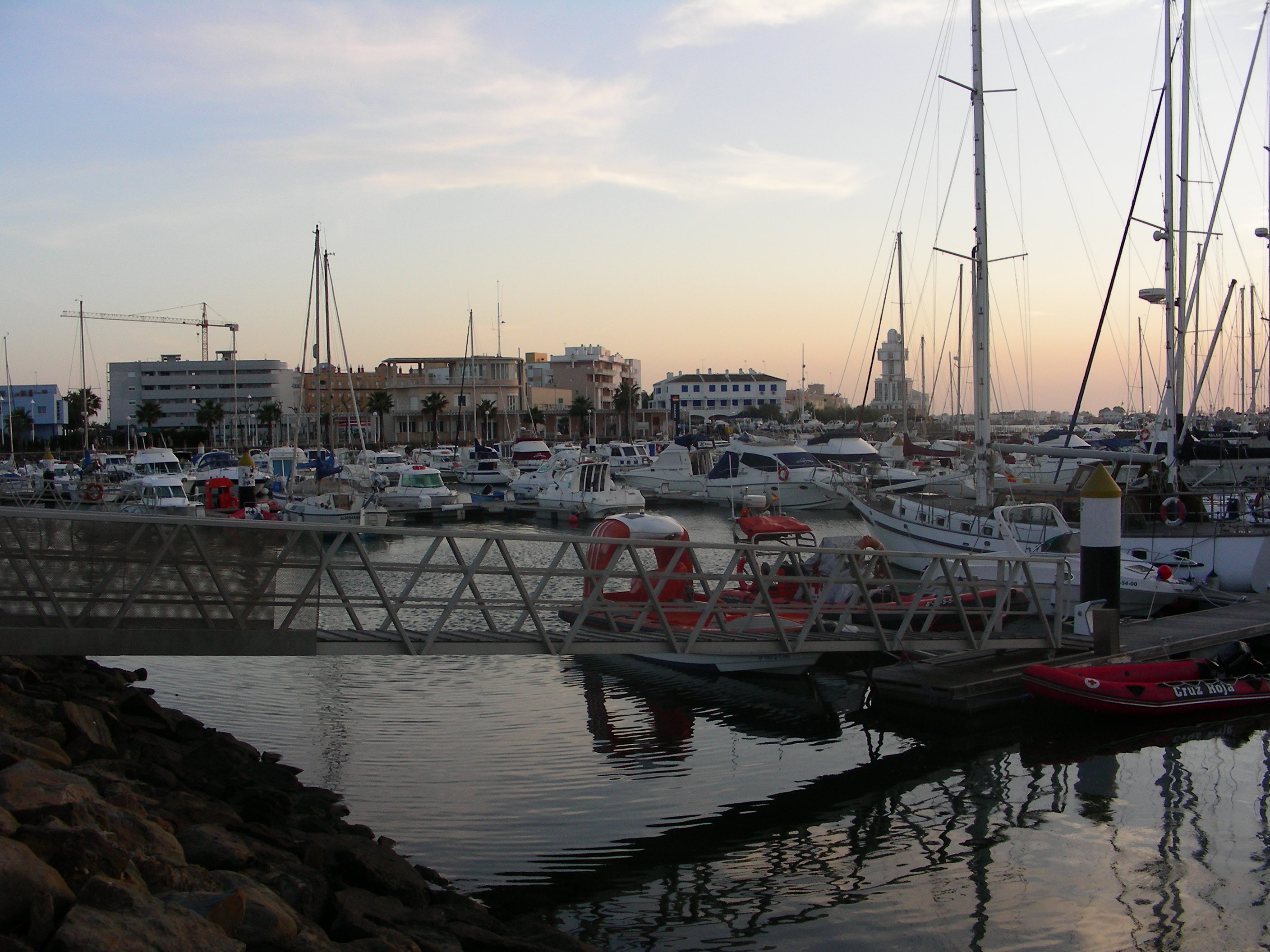
Isla Cristina

== History ==
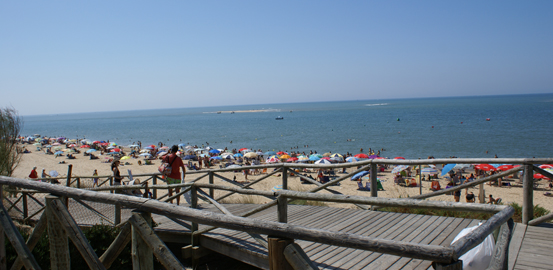
Nuevo Portil beach, Huelva

The Costa de la Luz has a history that dates back to the twelfth century BCE. Cultural attractions include Baelo Claudia, the well-preserved ruins of a small Roman city; Cape Trafalgar, where, in 1805, in sight of this promontory, the English admiral, Horatio Nelson, defeated a combined French and Spanish fleet; and La Rábida Monastery.

At the Rábida Monastery in Palos de la Frontera near Huelva, Christopher Columbus sought the aid of the Franciscan brothers, hoping to enlist them as advocates for his scheme to launch a voyage of discovery. They introduced Columbus to a wealthy local seafaring family, the Pinzón brothers, who eventually prevailed upon Ferdinand and Isabella to listen to Columbus's pitch for support. With royal patronage and the collaboration of the Pinzóns, Columbus was able to secure his three ships as well as local crews from the Huelva area.

== Climate ==
Köppen-Geiger climate classification system classifies its climate as hot-summer Mediterranean (Csa).

Climate data for Costa de la Luz
Month	Jan	Feb	Mar	Apr	May	Jun	Jul	Aug	Sep	Oct	Nov	Dec	Year
Mean daily maximum °C (°F)	15 (59)	16 (61)	18 (64)	20 (68)	23 (73)	26 (79)	28 (82)	28 (82)	27 (81)	23 (73)	19 (66)	16 (61)	22 (71)
Mean daily minimum °C (°F)	9 (48)	10 (50)	11 (52)	13 (55)	15 (59)	18 (64)	20 (68)	21 (70)	20 (68)	16 (61)	12 (54)	9 (48)	15 (58)
Average rainfall mm (inches)	71 (2.8)	72 (2.8)	89 (3.5)	48 (1.9)	33 (1.3)	9 (0.4)	1 (0.0)	2 (0.1)	19 (0.7)	76 (3.0)	84 (3.3)	106 (4.2)	610 (24)
Average rainy days	14	13	11	10	7	4	1	2	4	9	12	14	101
Mean daily sunshine hours	6	6	7	8	10	11	11	11	9	7	6	5	8
Source: Weather2Travel

Costa de la Luz mean sea temperature
Jan	Feb	Mar	Apr	May	Jun	Jul	Aug	Sep	Oct	Nov	Dec
16 °C (61 °F)	16 °C (61 °F)	16 °C (61 °F)	16 °C (61 °F)	18 °C (64 °F)	19 °C (66 °F)	21 °C (70 °F)	22 °C (72 °F)	22 °C (72 °F)	20 °C (68 °F)	18 °C (64 °F)	17 °C (63 °F)
