= Javi García (footballer, born 1977) =

Spanish footballer and coach

Personal information
- Full name: Javier García García
- Date of birth: 5 October 1977 (age 49)
- Place of birth: Girona, Spain
- Height: 1.70 m (5 ft 7 in)
- Position: Right back

Youth career
- Granada

Senior career*
Years	Team	Apps	(Gls)
1994–1997	Granada B		
1997–1999	Granada	63	(3)
1999–2001	Lleida	58	(2)
2001–2005	Recreativo	97	(2)
2005–2010	Granada	143	(1)
Total		361	(8)

Managerial career
- 2010–2013: Granada (assistant)
- 2014–2015: Atarfe Industrial
- * Club domestic league appearances and goals

Javier García García (born 5 October 1977) is a Spanish retired footballer who played as a right back, and is a current coach.

== Playing career ==
Born in Girona, Catalonia, García finished his formation with Granada CF, and made his senior debuts with the reserves in 1994. After appearing sparingly with the first team during 1996–97, he was definitely promoted for the following season, with the side still competing in Segunda División B.

García moved to Segunda División club UE Lleida in the 1999 summer, and played his first match as a professional on 21 August, coming on as a second-half substitute in a 2–2 home draw against Villarreal CF. He scored his first goal in that level on 8 October 2000, netting the game's only in a home success over CD Leganés.

In July 2001, García joined Recreativo de Huelva also in the second division. After being an ever-present figure in the 2001–02 campaign (as his team was promoted), he made his La Liga debut on 20 October 2002 by starting in a 0–2 loss at RCD Espanyol.

García scored his first goal in the Spanish top flight on 13 April 2003, in a 1–0 home win against Deportivo Alavés. He also played the full 90 minutes in the final of the Copa del Rey against RCD Mallorca, which Recre lost 0–3.

In the 2005 summer, García returned to Granada, now in Tercera División. He eventually retired at the end of 2009–10 at the age of 32, after achieving two promotions with the Andalusians; he also acted as team captain during his spell.

== Managerial career ==
Immediately after retiring, García was appointed as Fabri's assistant at his last club Granada. He left in July 2013, after failing to reach a new agreement with the board.

On 15 July 2014, García was named Atarfe Industrial CF manager. He left his post in the following year.
