= Loren Morón (footballer, born 1970) =

Spanish footballer

Loren
Personal information
- Full name: Lorenzo Morón Vizcaíno
- Date of birth: 16 February 1970 (age 56)
- Place of birth: Marbella, Spain
- Height: 1.86 m (6 ft 1 in)
- Position: Centre-back

Youth career
- Atlético Marbella

Senior career*
Years	Team	Apps	(Gls)
1989–1993	Atlético Marbella	65	(6)
1990	→ Galáctico Pegaso (loan)	6	(0)
1993–1996	Mérida	78	(2)
1996–2000	Salamanca	103	(7)
2000–2001	Sevilla	24	(2)
2001–2005	Recreativo	147	(3)
2005–2007	Marbella	59	(2)
Total		482	(22)

Managerial career
- 2007–2008: Atlético Marbella (assistant)
- 2008–2009: Los Barrios (assistant)
- 2010–2011: Villanovense (assistant)
- 2011–2012: Malaga B (assistant)
- 2012–2013: Unión Estepona (assistant)
- 2013–2014: Marbella (assistant)
- 2014–2015: Atlético Mancha Real
- 2015–2016: Marbella
- 2016–2017: Vélez
- 2017–2018: Mérida
- 2019: Mons Calpe
- 2020: Los Barrios
- * Club domestic league appearances and goals

Lorenzo Morón Vizcaíno (born 16 February 1970), known as Loren, is a Spanish former professional footballer who played as a central defender.

He amassed Segunda División totals of 279 games and ten goals, representing five clubs. He appeared in 99 La Liga matches over four seasons (five goals), with Mérida, Salamanca and Recreativo.

Loren worked as a manager after retiring.

== Playing career ==
Born in Marbella, Andalusia, Loren kickstarted his 18-year senior career with CA Marbella, helping the club promote from Tercera División to Segunda División in only two seasons. He made his debut in the latter competition on 6 September 1992, in a 1–1 home draw against CD Castellón.

In the summer of 1993, Loren signed with second-tier side CP Mérida, helping them promote to La Liga for the first time ever in his second year. In the following campaign, he started in all of his 22 league appearances in an eventual relegation as second-bottom.

Loren split the following nine years between the top flight and division two, in representation of UD Salamanca, Sevilla FC and Recreativo de Huelva. He scored a career-best three goals – at the professional level – with the second of those teams in 2000–01, adding his second championship in the second tier in the process. Two seasons later, his two goals from 32 appearances could not help prevent Recreativo from being relegated from the top tier, and he also started in the final of the Copa del Rey, a 3–0 loss to RCD Mallorca in Elche.

Loren retired in 2007 at the age of 37, after two years in the Segunda División B with his first club, now renamed UD Marbella.

== Coaching career ==
Loren started working as a head coach in late 2014, with amateurs Atlético Mancha Real. On 23 March 2015, he replaced Pablo Alfaro at the helm of Marbella as the team was placed inside the relegation zone, eventually leading them to a comfortable tenth-place finish in the third division.

After leaving Marbella by mutual consent in April 2016, Loren took over at nearby Tercera División club Vélez CF in October. In December 2017, over two decades after playing in the Extremaduran capital, he was hired as manager of Mérida AD, replacing Mehdi Nafti who returned to the helm the following March when the situation had not improved.

On 1 August 2019, Loren was appointed coach of Mons Calpe S.C. in the Gibraltar National League. He left shortly after, returning to his country and signing with amateurs UD Los Barrios in the same capacity.

== Personal life ==
Loren's son, also named Lorenzo, was also a footballer. A striker, he represented mainly Real Betis.

== Managerial statistics ==
As of 10 March 2018

Team	Nat	From	To	Record					Ref.
Team	Nat	From	To	G	W	D	L	Win %	Ref.
Atlético Mancha Real	(Spain)	17 December 2014	23 March 2015	14	5	5	4	35.71	
Marbella	(Spain)	23 March 2015	25 April 2016	43	14	19	10	32.56	
Vélez	(Spain)	17 October 2016	15 May 2017	29	9	6	14	31.03	
Mérida	(Spain)	27 December 2017	11 March 2018	10	2	3	5	20.00	
Career total				96	30	33	33	31.25	—

== Honours ==
Marbella

- Segunda División B: 1991–92

Mérida

- Segunda División: 1994–95

Sevilla

- Segunda División: 2000–01

Recreativo

- Copa del Rey runner-up: 2002–03
