= Miki Garro =

Spanish footballer (born 1975)

Personal information
- Full name: Miquel Garro Gomila
- Date of birth: 20 September 1975 (age 51)
- Place of birth: Palma, Spain
- Height: 1.88 m (6 ft 2 in)
- Position: Goalkeeper

Senior career*
Years	Team	Apps	(Gls)
1995–2000	Mallorca B	82	(0)
1998–1999	→ Binéfar (loan)	37	(0)
2000–2004	Mallorca	22	(0)
2004–2005	Ciudad de Murcia	16	(0)
Total		157	(0)
- * Club domestic league appearances and goals

Miquel Garro Gomila (born 20 September 1975) is a Spanish former footballer who played as a goalkeeper.

He played 38 total games for Mallorca, including in La Liga and the UEFA Champions League, and won the Copa del Rey in 2003. He retired aged 29 after one season at Ciudad de Murcia in the Segunda División and later worked as a goalkeeping coach for clubs including Mallorca.

== Playing career ==
Born in Palma de Mallorca, Garro began his career at hometown club RCD Mallorca. Having played for the reserve team in the Segunda División B, where he was also loaned to Binéfar, he made his first-team debut on 1 July 2000 in the first round of the UEFA Intertoto Cup, a 1–0 home win over Ceahlăul Piatra Neamț of Romania; a week later the team lost 3–1 in the second leg and were eliminated. New manager Luis Aragonés was not interested in the tournament, so the reserves coached by Juan Ramón López Caro contested the tie.

Garro made his La Liga debut on 22 April 2001 when regular goalkeeper Leo Franco suffered a muscular injury after 20 minutes away to Villarreal, a 2–2 draw. At the start of the following season, he faced competition from another Argentinian, Carlos Roa. On 30 October, he made his UEFA Champions League debut as the team won 1–0 at home to Panathinaikos in the final group game, therefore qualifying for the UEFA Cup.

In 2002–03, Mallorca won the Copa del Rey. Garro played the 1–0 win at Gramenet in the round of 64 and both legs of the 6–3 win over Real Valladolid in the last 16, but Franco played in the final win over Recreativo de Huelva in Elche. Weeks earlier, Garro played the fixture against Barcelona at the Camp Nou for the third consecutive season, due to the death of Franco's mother; his team won 2–1.

Garro played five games for Mallorca in the 2003–04 UEFA Cup, including both legs of a 3–1 aggregate win over Spartak Moscow in the last 32 in which his team won 3–0 in the first game in the Russian capital. In the second leg of the next round, he played in a much-changed squad that had already lost 4–1 away to Newcastle United, and conceded three more goals to be eliminated.

Subsequently, Mallorca planned to have Miguel Ángel Moyá and Alberto Cifuentes as goalkeepers, while selling Franco and releasing Garro; the latter was not pleased that the club then signed a higher-earning third goalkeeper in Sander Westerveld. On 20 July 2004, Garro signed for newly promoted Segunda División club Ciudad de Murcia on a one-year deal. He turned down an extension, and approaches from Almería and Hércules did not materialise; in September 2005, the 29-year-old retired.

== Coaching career ==
Garro worked as a goalkeeping coach at Mallorca in the 2010s. He had the same job at Beijing Renhe under compatriot Luis García, winning promotion to the Chinese Super League. In 2021, he was assigned the same post in Spain's under-17 and under-18 national teams.

== Personal life ==
Garro's father of the same name, who died in 2012, was the president of RCD Mallorca's federation of fan clubs.

== Career statistics ==
Appearances and goals by club, season and competition
Club	Season	League			National cup		Europe		Other		Total	
Club	Season	Division	Apps	Goals	Apps	Goals	Apps	Goals	Apps	Goals	Apps	Goals
Mallorca B	1995–96	Segunda División B	10	0	—		—		—		10	0
Mallorca B	1996–97	Segunda División B	34	0	—		—		—		34	0
Mallorca B	1997–98	Segunda División B	4	0	—		—		1	0	5	0
Mallorca B	1999–2000	Segunda División B	34	0	—		—		—		34	0
Mallorca B	Total		82	0	—		—		1	0	83	0
Binéfar (loan)	1998–99	Segunda División B	37	0	2	0	—		—		39	0
Mallorca	2000–01	La Liga	7	0	0	0	2	0	—		9	0
Mallorca	2001–02	La Liga	7	0	3	0	1	0	—		11	0
Mallorca	2002–03	La Liga	2	0	3	0	—		—		5	0
Mallorca	2003–04	La Liga	6	0	2	0	5	0	0	0	13	0
Mallorca	Total		22	0	8	0	8	0	0	0	38	0
Ciudad de Murcia	2004–05	Segunda División	16	0	2	0	—		—		18	0
Career total			157	0	12	0	8	0	1	0	178	0
