= Manu Viale =

Argentine footballer

Personal information
- Full name: Juan Manuel Viale Ochoa
- Date of birth: 9 March 1981 (age 45)
- Place of birth: Córdoba, Argentina
- Height: 1.91 m (6 ft 3 in)
- Position: Centre back

Team information
- Current team: Mollet

Youth career
- –1999: Mallorca

Senior career*
Years	Team	Apps	(Gls)
1999–2003	Mallorca B	90	(5)
2002–2003	→ Ciudad Murcia (loan)	13	(0)
2003–2004	Sabadell	25	(1)
2004–2005	Zamora	27	(0)
2005–2006	Gramenet	23	(1)
2006	Figueres	9	(0)
2007	Logroñés	19	(0)
2007–2009	Dénia	63	(5)
2009–2014	Hospitalet	129	(5)
2014–2016	Sant Andreu	55	(4)
2016–2017	Vilassar Mar	14	(1)
2017–	Mollet	8	(2)
- * Club domestic league appearances and goals as of 26 August 2018

Juan Manuel "Manu" Viale Ochoa (born 9 March 1981) is an Argentine footballer who plays for Spanish club CF Mollet as a central defender.

== Football career ==
Born in Córdoba, Viale played his entire senior career in Spain, but never in higher than Segunda División B. He started out at RCD Mallorca in 1999, but was all but associated with the B-team during his four-year tenure; he appeared in two games with the main squad in the 2000 UEFA Intertoto Cup, both against FC Ceahlăul Piatra Neamț (3–4 aggregate loss).

In the 2008–09 season Viale scored a career-high three goals in 32 games, helping CD Dénia narrowly avoid relegation from the third level.

== Personal life ==
He had 4 children: Andrea Viale, Alex Viale, Manel Viale and Martin Viale. Viale's younger brother, Lucas, was also a footballer and a stopper. They shared teams at CE L'Hospitalet and UE Sant Andreu.
