= El Rompido =

- Village
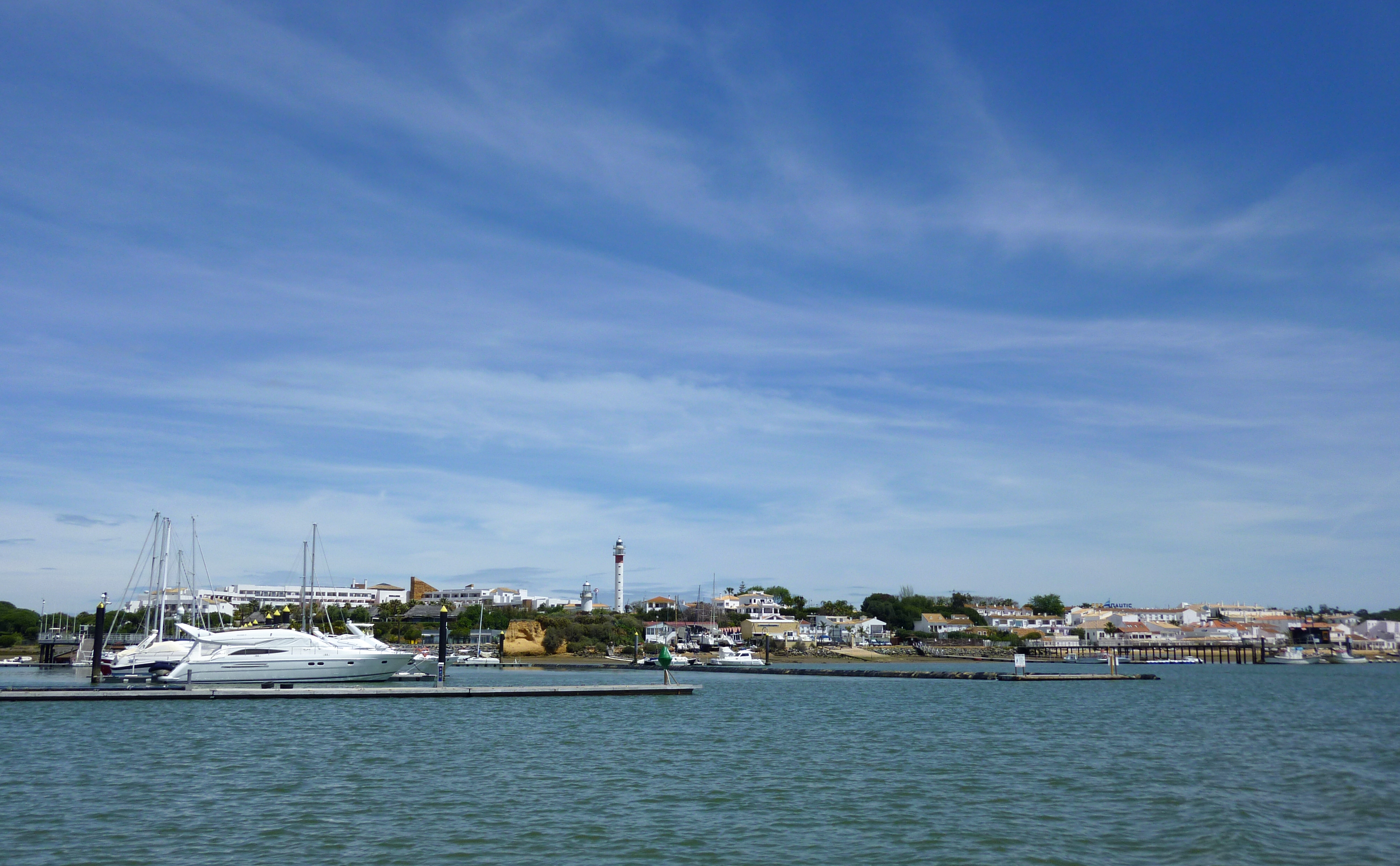
- El Rompido seen from the Río Piedras

- Location in Spain
- Coordinates: 37°13′8″N 7°7′33″W
- Country: Spain
- Autonomous community: Andalusia
- Province: Huelva
- Comarca: Costa Occidental

Population (2017)
  - Total: 1,832
- Time zone: UTC+1 (CET)
  - Summer (DST): UTC+2 (CEST)

El Rompido is a coastal borough in the municipality of Cartaya located in the province of Huelva in Andalusia, Spain. Founded in the 16th century. El Rompido is situated by the mouth of the Río Piedras. It has 1,832 inhabitants and is 8 kilometres south of Cartaya.

== History ==
Evidence of human settlement in El Rompido dates back the Paleolithic era at the mouth of the Río Piedras. In 1971, 208 pieces of quartzite thought to date back to the third to ninth millennium were discovered in El Rompido. There are indications that the area was used as a fishing settlement in the era of the Roman Empire. Evidence of settlement in El Rompido during the Islamic presence in Spain from 711 until 1614 have not been found, however. Tourism is El Rompido's primary industry, having slowly been built up in the beginning in the 1960s, and a more recent, sharp upturn occurring in the second decade of the 21st-century.

== Other information ==
El Rompido is home to Marismas del Río y La flecha-de Nueva Umbria Natural Area, a reserve in the Río Piedras marshlands given protective status in 1989. The reserve is home to a variety of flora and fauna. In El Rompido there are a number of hotels, a town centre and two golf courses. Situated in Andalucía, neighbouring towns include Cartaya, Lepe, Punta Umbría and Ayamonte. The economy also used to rely on fishing as it is on the coast, next to a spit flecha-de Nueva Umbria (English: Arrow of El Rompido) separated by the Río Piedras. Fishing was, for a long time, the key part of life in El Rompido with boats still docked on the beach today, primarily cflatfish and shrimp. Almadraba tuna fishing attracted many Portuguese workers and people alike. On the last weekend of July the village celebrates the festival of the Virgen del Carmen, a festival commonly celebrated in southern Spain. In the 1980s and 1990s the celebrations became so notorious in the Huelva area that upwards of 3,000 people would attend the festival. The figures seen back then have somewhat declined in the 2000s.
