= Ayamonte CF =

Ayamonte
- Full name: Ayamonte Club de Fútbol
- Founded: 1930
- Ground: Ciudad de Ayamonte, Ayamonte, Andalusia, Spain
- Capacity: 5,500
- Chairman: (Spain) Juan Morales
- Manager: (Spain) Jordi Vázquez
- League: Primera Andaluza Huelva
- 2024–25: División de Honor – Group 1, 15th of 16 (relegated)
Home colours	Away colours

Ayamonte Club de Fútbol is a Spanish football team based in Ayamonte, Huelva, in the autonomous community of Andalusia. Founded in 1930 it plays in Primera Andaluza Huelva, holding home matches at Estadio Ciudad de Ayamonte, with a 5,000-seat capacity.

== Season to season ==
Season	Tier	Division	Place	Copa del Rey
1951–52	4	1ª Reg.		
1952–53	4	1ª Reg.	5th	
1953–54	4	1ª Reg.	10th	
1954–55	4	1ª Reg.	10th	
1955–56	4	1ª Reg.	2nd	
1956–57	3	3ª	4th	
1957–58	3	3ª	12th	
1958–59	3	3ª	11th	
1959–60	3	3ª	4th	
1960–61	3	3ª	3rd	
1961–62	3	3ª	11th	
1962–63	3	3ª	6th	
1963–64	3	3ª	6th	
1964–65	3	3ª	14th	
1965–66	3	3ª	9th	
1966–67	3	3ª	9th	
1967–68	3	3ª	9th	
1968–69	3	3ª	18th	
1969–70	3	3ª	17th	
1970–71	4	1ª Reg.	9th	

Season	Tier	Division	Place	Copa del Rey
1971–72	4	1ª Reg.	20th	
1972–73	5	2ª Reg.	1st	
1973–74	5	2ª Reg.	1st	
1974–75	4	1ª Reg.	18th	
1975–76	5	1ª Reg.	5th	
1976–77	5	1ª Reg.	1st	
1977–78	5	Reg. Pref.	11th	
1978–79	5	Reg. Pref.	15th	
1979–80	5	Reg. Pref.	4th	
1980–81	4	3ª	16th	
1981–82	5	Reg. Pref.	3rd	
1982–83	5	Reg. Pref.	3rd	
1983–84	4	3ª	17th	
1984–85	5	Reg. Pref.	9th	
1985–86	5	Reg. Pref.	1st	
1986–87	4	3ª	7th	
1987–88	4	3ª	6th	
1988–89	4	3ª	5th	
1989–90	4	3ª	13th	
1990–91	4	3ª	18th	

Season	Tier	Division	Place	Copa del Rey
1991–92	5	Reg. Pref.	14th	
1992–93	5	Reg. Pref.	7th	
1993–94	5	Reg. Pref.	3rd	
1994–95	5	Reg. Pref.	1st	
1995–96	5	Reg. Pref.	1st	
1996–97	4	3ª	4th	
1997–98	4	3ª	12th	
1998–99	4	3ª	15th	
1999–2000	4	3ª	15th	
2000–01	4	3ª	10th	
2001–02	4	3ª	6th	
2002–03	4	3ª	18th	
2003–04	5	Reg. Pref.	2nd	
2004–05	5	1ª And.	9th	
2005–06	5	1ª And.	1st	
2006–07	4	3ª	14th	
2007–08	4	3ª	16th	
2008–09	4	3ª	9th	
2009–10	4	3ª	3rd	
2010–11	4	3ª	17th	

Season	Tier	Division	Place	Copa del Rey
2011–12	4	3ª	17th	
2012–13	4	3ª	17th	
2013–14	4	3ª	20th	
2014–15	6	2ª And.	13th	
2015–16	6	2ª And.	6th	
2016–17	6	1ª And.	4th	
2017–18	6	1ª And.	2nd	
2018–19	6	1ª And.	1st	
2019–20	6	1ª And.	2nd	
2020–21	6	1ª And.	2nd	
2021–22	6	Div. Hon.	2nd	
2022–23	5	3ª Fed.	13th	
2023–24	5	3ª Fed.	17th	
2024–25	6	Div. Hon.	15th	
2025–26	7	1ª And.		

- 36 seasons in Tercera División
- 2 seasons in Tercera Federación

== Former players ==
- (Equatorial Guinea) Camilo Nvo
