= Camilo Nvo =

Equatoguinean footballer

Camilo
Personal information
- Full name: Camilo Lucas Nvo Engonga
- Date of birth: 30 March 1986 (age 40)
- Place of birth: Malabo, Equatorial Guinea
- Height: 1.78 m (5 ft 10 in)
- Position: Defensive midfielder

Senior career*
Years	Team	Apps	(Gls)
	Sony de Elá Nguema	–	(–)
	Rayo Lasser	–	(–)
	Cultural	–	(–)
–2008	Atlético Malabo	–	(–)
2008–2009	Cartaya	18	(0)
2009–2011	Ayamonte	50	(2)
2011–2012	Olímpica Valverdeña	0	(0)
2012–2013	Isla Cristina	0	(0)
2013–2014	Olímpica Valverdeña	0	(0)

International career
	Equatorial Guinea U-17	22	(?)
	Equatorial Guinea U-21	18	(?)
2006	Equatorial Guinea	1	(0)
- * Club domestic league appearances and goals

Camilo Lucas Nvo Engonga (born 30 March 1986), known as Papa, is a retired Equatoguinean footballer, who played as a midfielder.

== Career ==
Camilo began his career in one of the most popular clubs of his natal city, CD Elá Nguema, club that belongs to the Equatoguinean Premier League. Then he was in two teams of minor relevancy in Malabo, Rayo Lasser and CD Cultural (the latter club represents to the Centro Cultural Hispano-Guineano). Later, he was transferred to Atlético Malabo, turning thus to the most important level of the Equatoguinean football. Because he had been good there, Camilo went out of Equatorial Guinea to sign, in December 2008, for the Spanish club AD Cartaya in the Tercera División. Cándido Rosado was his head coach there, who later passed to be head coach to Ayamonte CF, deciding to sign Camilo in the latter club for the following season.

== International career ==
Camilo was an Equatoguinean full international footballer in a friendly match against Benin on 26 February 2006. He already had taken part of youth national teams, both U17 and U21.
He was called to represent the Equatoguinean team at the 2006 Lusophony Games but, when the games began, Equatorial Guinea didn't send any athletes.

== Personal ==
As of 2009 he's studying business at the University of Huelva.
