= Marcos Martín (footballer) =

Spanish footballer

Marcos
Personal information
- Full name: Marcos Martín de la Fuente
- Date of birth: 17 September 1968 (age 58)
- Place of birth: Palma de Mallorca, Spain
- Height: 1.80 m (5 ft 11 in)
- Position: Defensive midfielder

Youth career
- CIDE
- Mallorca

Senior career*
Years	Team	Apps	(Gls)
1987–1990	Mallorca B	33	(8)
1988–1991	Mallorca	36	(5)
1991–1997	Sevilla	209	(12)
1997–2000	Mérida	98	(4)
2000–2005	Mallorca	139	(4)
Total		515	(33)
- * Club domestic league appearances and goals

Marcos Martín de la Fuente (born 17 September 1968), known simply as Marcos, is a Spanish former professional footballer who played as a defensive midfielder.

He recorded 402 games and 25 goals over 15 seasons in La Liga, representing mainly in the competition Mallorca (eight years) and Sevilla (six).

== Club career ==
Born in Palma de Mallorca, Marcos grew in RCD Mallorca's youth system. He made his first-team – and La Liga – debut on 6 March 1988, starting in a 1–0 away loss against Real Betis as the season ended in relegation. He played a further two campaigns with the Balearic Islands club in the top flight, scoring his first goals in the competition on 8 April 1990 in the 5–1 home win over Cádiz CF.

With Mallorca, Marcos featured the full 120 minutes of a 2–0 home victory against HNK Hajduk Split in the third qualifying round of the UEFA Champions League (2–1 on aggregate), for their first-ever participation in the tournament. He also started and finished the 1–0 defeat of Arsenal in the group-stage opener.

Marcos joined Sevilla FC in the summer of 1991. He never appeared in less than 32 league games during his spell in Andalusia, his best output occurring in 1994–95 as he netted four times in 33 matches to help his team to the fifth position; additionally, he took part in six UEFA Cup fixtures with the side, all in the 1995–96 edition.

From 1997 to 2000, Marcos represented CP Mérida, being relegated twice in three years. Aged 32, he then returned to his first club, spending a further five seasons in the Spanish top tier. He retired in June 2005, being immediately appointed as coordinator to the youth system.

== Honours ==
Mallorca

- Copa del Rey: 2002–03; runner-up: 1990–91

== See also ==
- List of La Liga players (400+ appearances)
