= Cartaya =

Municipality and town in Andalusia, Spain

- Municipality & Town
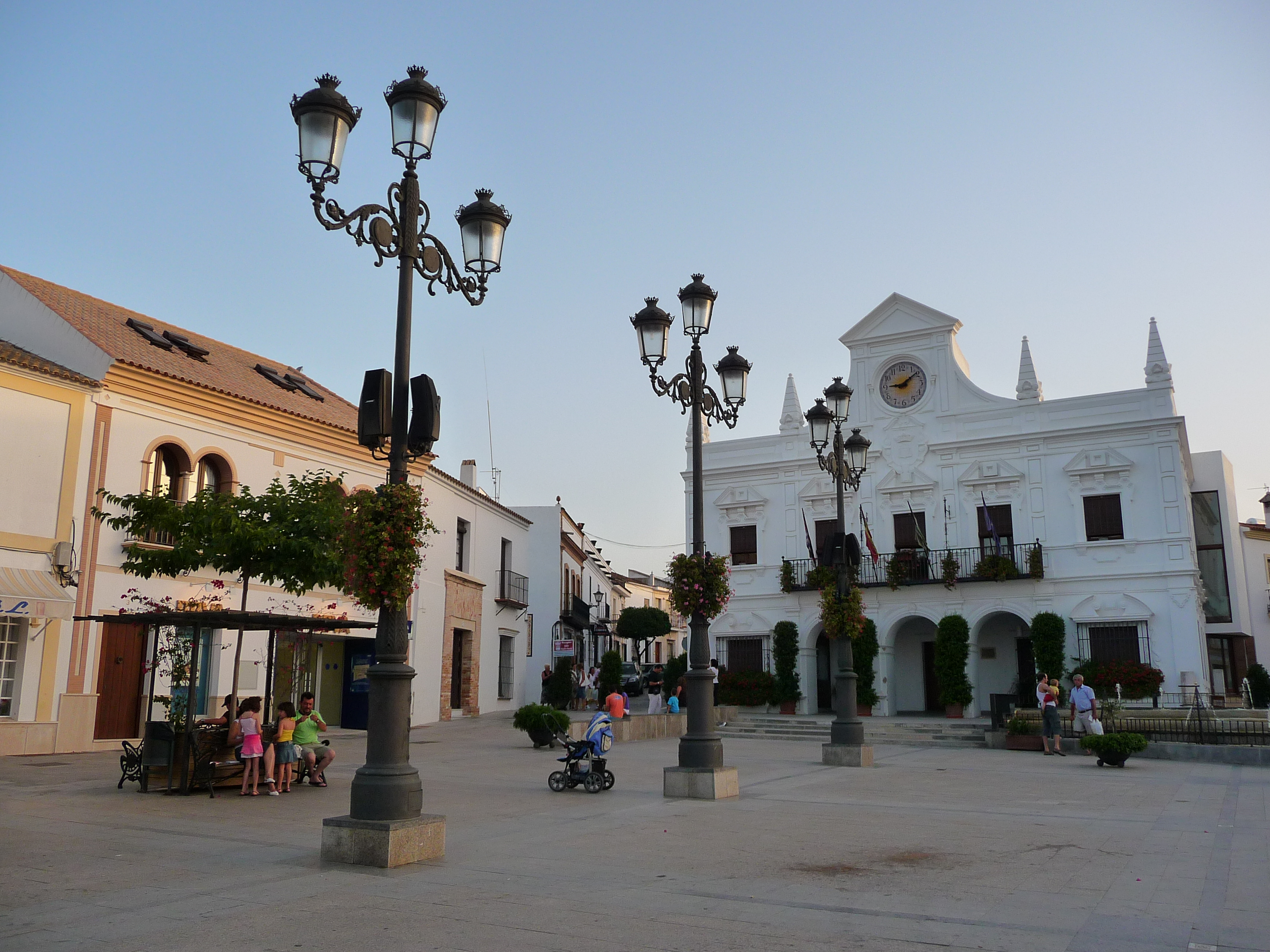

- Flag Coat of arms
- Motto: Cartaya: pines and sea & Cartaya ahead Spain Cartaya: pinos y mar & Cartaya por delante
- Interactive map of Cartaya
- Location in Spain
- Coordinates: 37°17′N 7°09′W
- Country: Spain
- Autonomous Community: Andalusia
- Province: Huelva
- Comarca: Costa Occidental de Huelva
- Judicial district: Ayamonte
- Municipality: Cartaya
- Mancomunidad: Manc. Beturia
- Foundation: 15th century
- Boroughs: 3 Populated place: Cartaya; El Rompido; Nuevo Portil

Government
  - Type: Mayor–council
  - Body: City Council of Cartaya
  - Mayor: Juan Miguel Polo Plana (ICAR)

Area
  - Total: 2,264 km^{2} (874 sq mi)
- Elevation: 26 m (85 ft)

Population (2025-01-01)
  - Total: 21,471
  - Density: 9.484/km^{2} (24.56/sq mi)
- Demonym(s): cartayero (m), cartayera (f)
- Time zone: UTC+1 (CET)
  - Summer (DST): UTC+2 (CEST)
- Postcode: 21450
- Website: http://www.ayto-cartaya.es/

Cartaya is a Spanish locality and municipality in the Province of Huelva, (autonomous community of Andalusia). According to the 2025 municipal register, it has a population of 21,741 inhabitants. Its surface area is 226.4 km^{2} and has a density of 81.34 people per km^{2}.

The present town of Cartaya was founded in the 15th century by the Marquis of Gibraleón, Don Pedro de Zúñiga. Its name comes from the Phoenician word "Carteia", meaning city, which implies that the site had been settled much earlier. Traces have been found dating from the late Roman Empire and there is evidence of farmsteads from the early medieval period.

The municipality's economy is mainly based on the primary sector. However, more recent development has been encouraged in the service sector focused on leisure and tourism. The per capita income is high in comparison to neighboring municipalities. The newer settlements of El Rompido and Nuevo Portil, along with other developments, have contributed to significant population growth over recent decades.

Among the area's noteworthy attractions are: the former Convent of the Blessed Trinity; the Parish Church; the Hermitage of Santa María de Consolación; the Castle of the Zuñiga; and 4 kilometers of beaches (El Rompido, San Miguel Beach, Nuevo Portil beach and the westernmost part of El Portil).

== Etymology ==
The toponym Cartaya seems to be of Phoenician origin: Qart or Carteia, meaning The City. In the Andalusian period, it was referred to by the name qarqaya, phonetically very similar to the present. Cartaya should not be confused with Libertinorum Carteia in San Roque.

== Symbols ==
Shield

The municipal blazon is:

Of gules, the golden castle of vert abjured sustained natural mount, and this sustained of silver and azure waves. On both sides of the castle, two mace-bearers.

It was approved by decree of 21 July 1972 and published in the BOE on 24 August that year.

Flag

The municipal flag was adopted at the plenary municipal meeting of 10 August 1998 and it has the following description:

Red with six bands in the low, three white and three blue. Centered and superimposed local arms.

== Geography ==
=== Situation ===
Cartaya is located 26 km (16 mi) west of Huelva and 112 km (70 mi) from Seville.

Location

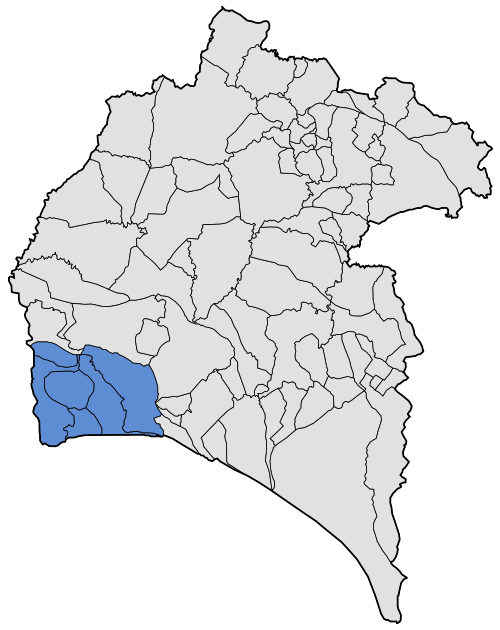
Comarca of the Costa Occidental de Huelva.

The municipality of Cartaya is located in the southwest of the province of Huelva. It lies on the estuary of the Piedra river, which forms the southern and eastern edge of the territory. The main settlement of Cartaya is situated upstream on the east bank of the Piedra. The smaller settlement of El Rompido is further upstream, on the estuary itself, while El Portil – which falls partly within Punta Umbría – is right at the river-mouth, on the Atlantic coast.

The municipality covers an area of 226.4 km^{2} (87.4 sq mi) with an average altitude of 26 masl.

Bordering populations

The nearest town is Lepe: five miles to the west, on the other side of the river Piedra. To the northeast is Gibraleón and to the south-east is Punta Umbría, which separated from the municipality of Cartaya in 1963.

=== Orography ===
The relief of the region can be categorized into three main types. The fluvial-coastal zone includes the floodplain of the river down to and including the Atlantic coastline and San Miguel Beach. The wooded zone is made up of pine groves and low hills. The remaining part of the region is made up of fields.

The soil is composed of gravel and conglomerates of detritic coverages, glacis and eroded hillsides. Most of the orography was formed in the Quaternary Period, although the higher ground shows outcrops of Paleozoic shale.

One of the most distinctive features of the landscape is the long peninsula known as the "Arrow of Nueva Umbría" or "Arrow of El Rompido". Possession of this narrow strip of land is a source of dispute between the municipalities of Lepe and Cartaya. Another local landmark is the Lagoon of El Portil.

Geodesic data

Cartaya's geodesic vertices
Municipal area	Geodesic point	Altitude	Number	MTN leaf	Coordeinates
Cartaya	Miramundo	170,158	98093	980	37°17′N 7°09′W

Fuentes: Instituto Geográfico Nacional (Spain) – IGN

=== Climate ===
The region has a Mediterranean climate. The winters are very mild, with temperatures rarely dropping below 10 °C; the summers are warm, generally reaching highs of over 30 °C in July and August. Precipitation is not very abundant.

The table below shows the average temperature and rainfall by month for the year 2007:

Climate data for Cartaya
Month	Jan	Feb	Mar	Apr	May	Jun	Jul	Aug	Sep	Oct	Nov	Dec	Year
Mean daily maximum °C (°F)	16.3 (61.3)	17.3 (63.1)	19.7 (67.5)	21 (70)	24.8 (76.6)	27.5 (81.5)	32.7 (90.9)	31 (88)	28.1 (82.6)	25 (77)	21 (70)	17.1 (62.8)	23.5 (74.3)
Mean daily minimum °C (°F)	6 (43)	8.5 (47.3)	6.9 (44.4)	9.7 (49.5)	12 (54)	15.5 (59.9)	21 (70)	22.7 (72.9)	20 (68)	15.9 (60.6)	11.7 (53.1)	10.2 (50.4)	13.5 (56.3)
Average precipitation mm (inches)	42 (1.7)	64 (2.5)	16 (0.6)	33 (1.3)	36 (1.4)	4 (0.2)	2 (0.1)	4 (0.2)	55 (2.2)	48 (1.9)	52 (2.0)	21 (0.8)	373 (14.7)
Source: World Meteorological Organization (UN)

=== Hydrology ===
The principal river is the Piedra, which forms the boundary between the municipalities of Cartaya and Lepe. The river's source is in the municipality of El Almendro, although many tributary streams rise in the municipality of Villanueva de los Castillejos. At one time, the river mouth was by the village of El Rompido, whose name derives from the ocean waves breaking against the river sediment. However, the sediments deposited by the river have built up over time in an easterly direction, giving rise to features such as the "Arrow of Nueva Umbria" and the Lagoon of El Portil.

The water supply of Cartaya municipality comes from the Chanza Reservoir, situated in another municipality.

=== Ecology ===
Flora

There are 12,000 hectares of forest in the area; mostly pine, juniper, new plantations of eucalyptus trees and some smaller areas of evergreen oaks and cork oaks. Along with the marshland areas of the "Marshes of the River Piedra" and the "Arrow of Nueva Umbria", these make up the most significant area of semi-virgin land on the Andalusian coast.

The "Arrow of Nueva Umbria" is an unusual habitat, formed by the effects of winds and tides on the river sediments. It contains three main ecosystems: dune, retama, and marsh. Due to the conditions, very few plants can thrive there. Typical flora includes sea holly, beach grass, white retama, mastic, and other salt-tolerant vegetation.

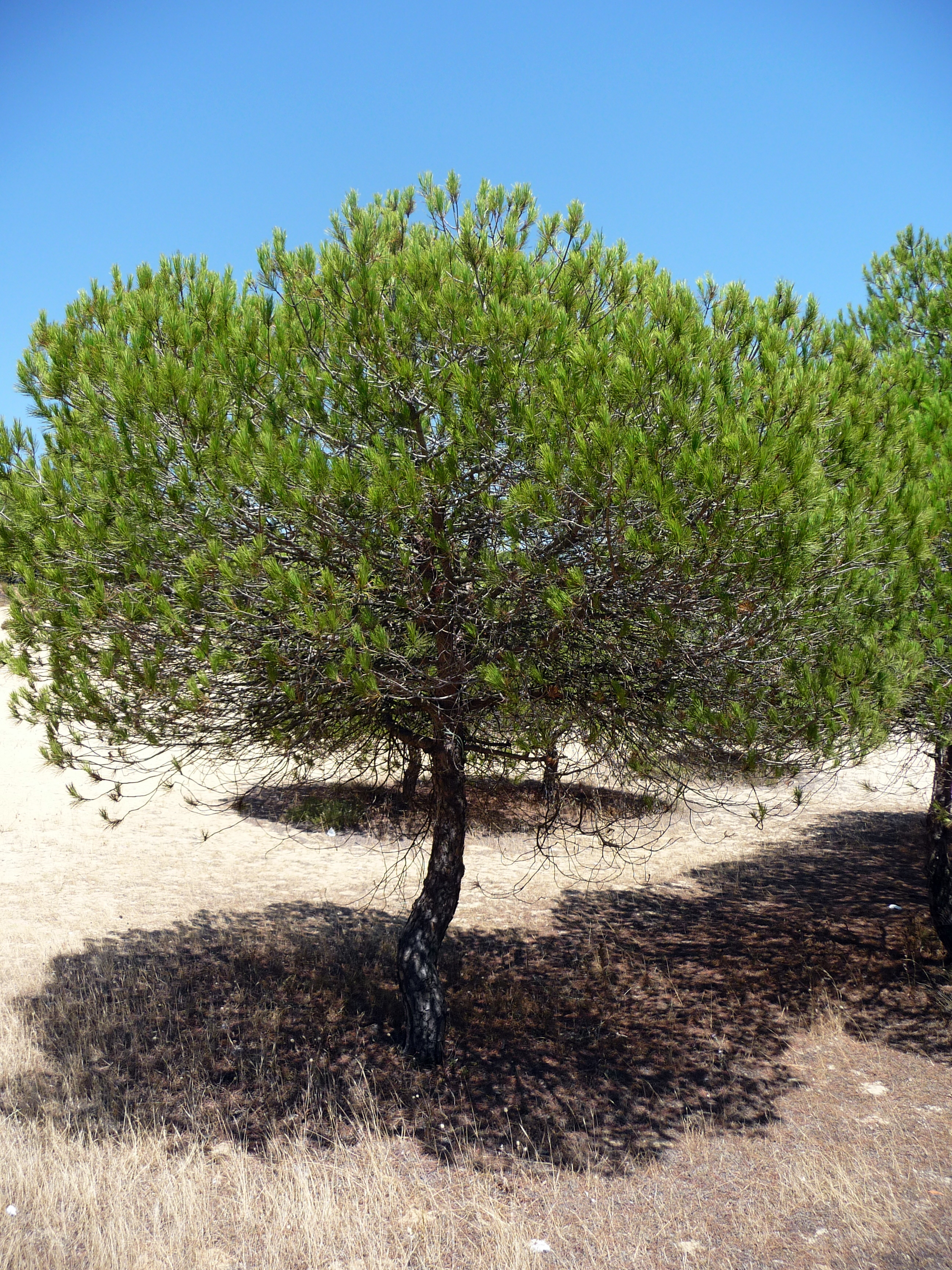
Pine in Aguas del Pino, San Miguel beach.

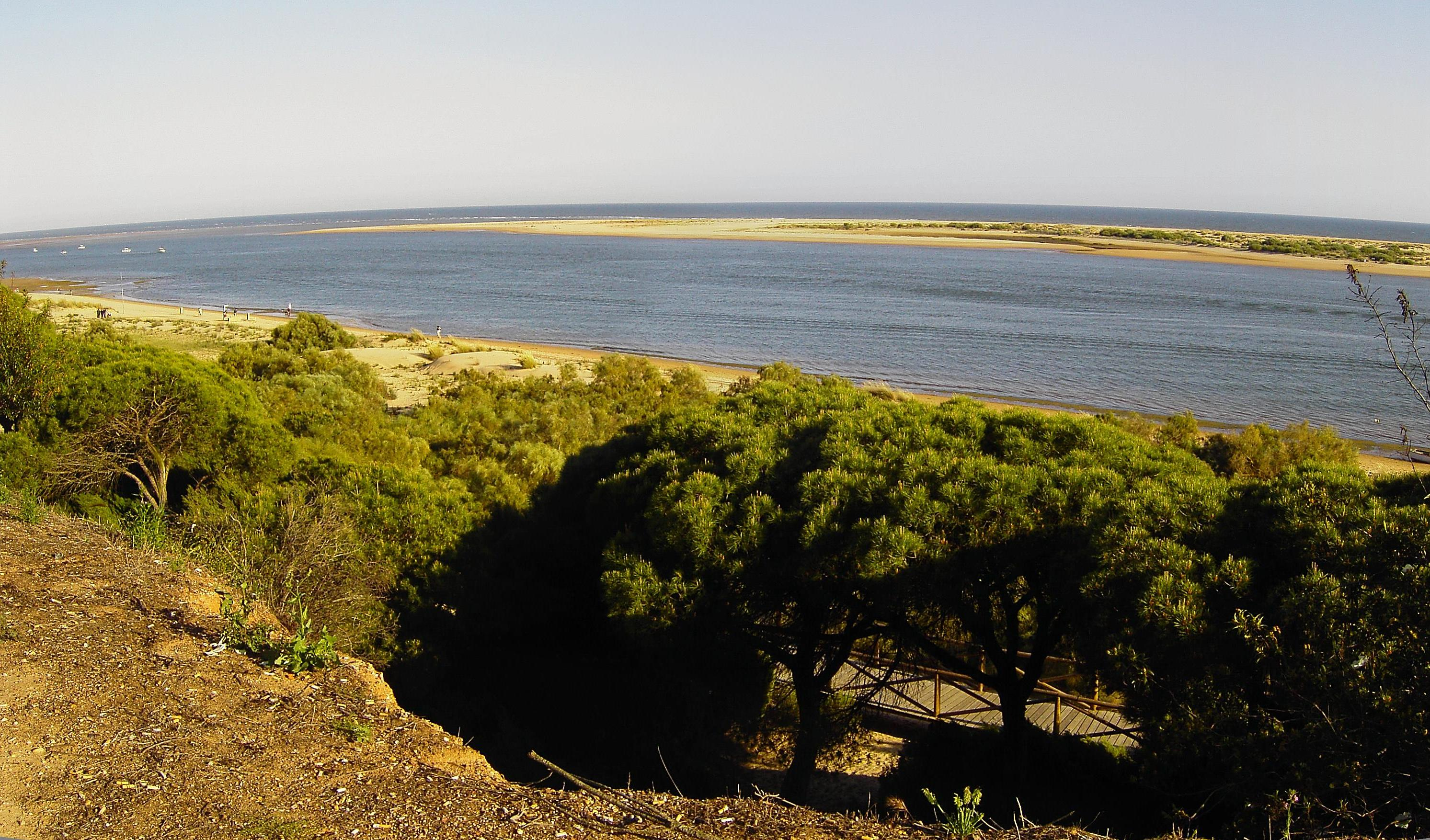
Arrow of Nueva Umbria.

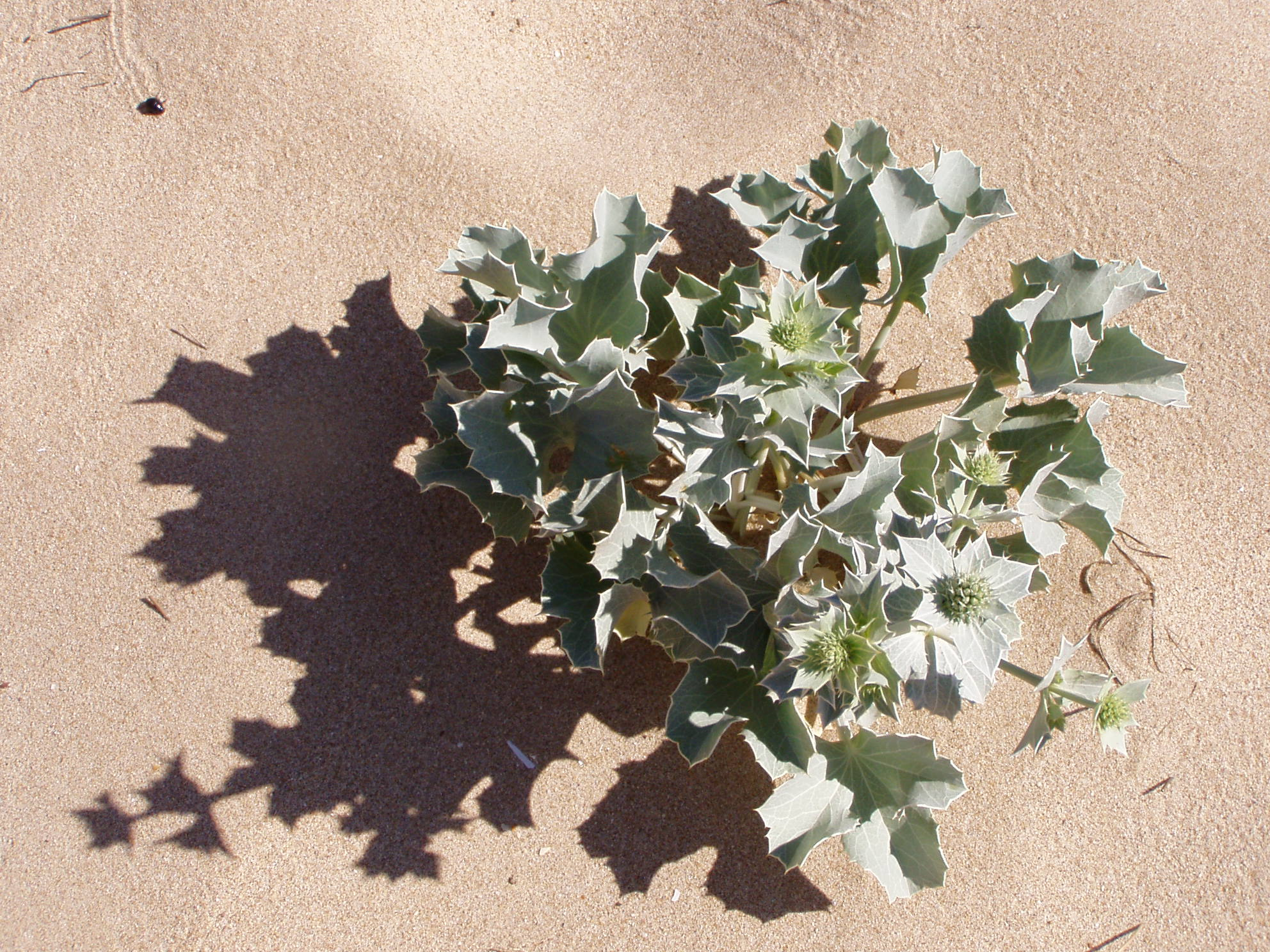
Sea holly.

== History ==
=== Prehistory ===
There is little prehistoric archaeological evidence in the area. Around the mouth of the Piedra, small pieces of Lower Paleolithic stone tools have been found: mostly early acheulean deposits (edges, some bifaces and beaks) or Mousterian deposits from the Middle Paleolithic. There seems to have been no connection between the populations here and those living around the nearby Odiel and Tinto rivers.

=== Romanization ===
Although Cartaya and the nearby coast (where there are many discoveries of shipwrecks) were probably settled by the Phoenicians, the area developed significantly under the Romans. Within the Roman Empire, this area formed part of the Beturia Celtic orTurdula region in the senatorial province of Hispania Baetica. Cartaya found itself close to the Roman road linking the cities of Praesidio and Ad Rubras. This was an area dedicated to the pottery industry – especially the manufacture of amphorae – which may have been destined for the settlement of Punta Umbría or Onuba Aesturia.

In the later Roman period, the Visigoths arrived in Iberia. However, – in common with most of the Huelva region – Cartaya shows little significant evidence of their presence.

=== Middle Ages ===
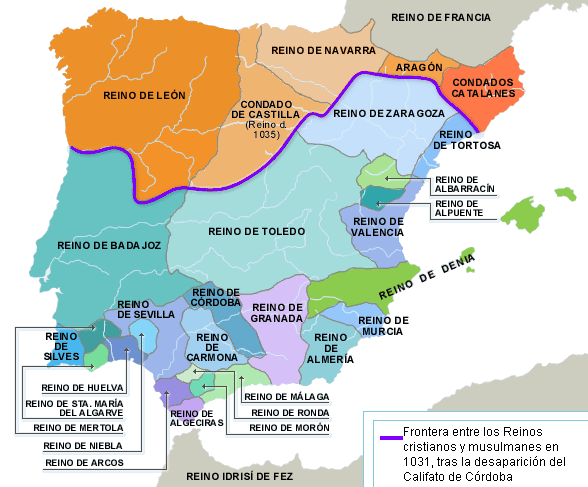
Situation of the Taifa of Huelva in the peninsula towards the 11th century.

During the time of Al-Andalus, these lands were known as Cashtm. At first, Cashtm was part of the Kūra of Labla, belonging to Għarb al-Andalus. After the fall of the Caliphate of Córdoba in 1012, it became part of the Taifa of Huelva. In 1052, these territories came under the control of the Taifa of Seville.

In 1262, Alfonso X the Wise captured the cities of Niebla and Huelva and the region came once again under Christian rule. The province of Huelva became an important frontier territory – part of the "Banda Gallega" which was formed to prevent the eastward expansion of Portugal. By 1269, the river Piedra had been established as the border between Cartaya and Lepe. At that time, maps suggest, the Piedra met the sea at the present-day site of El Rompido.

Otrosí mandamos a Maestre Fernán García [...] que partiesen los términos entre Gibraleón e Ayamonte e ellos partieronlos e pisieron los moxones de esta guisa. Como caye el río de las Piedras en la Mar e va derechamente arriba e sacude a la Alcaria de Mertola e de esta Alcaria a Moxon cubierto hasta Guadiana.

— Según copia de D. Corpas González, 1917.

=== Founding of Cartaya ===
Coat of arms of the Zuñiga's family, who founded the present town of Cartaya in the 15th century.

During the 15th and 16th centuries, the territory of Cartaya came under the rule of the house of Zuñiga. Against the opposition of Alfonso de Guzmán, lord of Ayamonte and Lepe, Don Pedro de Zuñiga y Manrique de Lara won the right to establish a ferry across the river Piedra. In doing so, he founded the town of Cartaya to defend the crossing against attacks by Berber and Norman pirates. Seven years later, he gave the town greater permanence by ordering the construction of a castle and a church. The original church was built in the Mudéjar style; it was later replaced by the present parish church of San Pedro. The imposing castle, however, still stands on the western edge of the town. The house of Zuñiga consolidated its power in lower Andalusia through Don Pedro's descendant, Álvaro de Zúñiga. His eldest son acquired the neighboring territories of Lepe and La Redondela by marriage to the daughter of Juan Alfonso de Guzmán III of Ayamonte.

Cartaya's port of La Ribera soon became important. By 1509, ships from Cartaya were fishing in Cape Spartel and Cape Bojador to supply fish for Seville. Transport ships were travelling as far afield as Flanders to engage in cabotage and commerce, including the wine and grain trades. Although the local shipyards were building caravels as early as the 15th century, this industry never grew to national importance. This was partly because of the perceived poor quality of the local wood, which led ships from the Gulf of Cádiz to be banned from sailing to the Americas. Cartaya never became as important to Spain's maritime empire as some nearby towns, such as Palos de la Frontera or Moguer. Nevertheless, her sailors took part in the famous voyages of Christopher Columbus. Records list the local names Talafar, Vizcaino and Alonso Rodríguez on board the first voyage of Columbus. The same three appear to have returned on the Second Columbian expedition, where they are named as Rodrigo Calafar (aboard the caravel La Niña), Alonso Rodríguez (sailing on the San Juan), and Juan Vizcaíno (on the Cardera).

=== Modern era ===
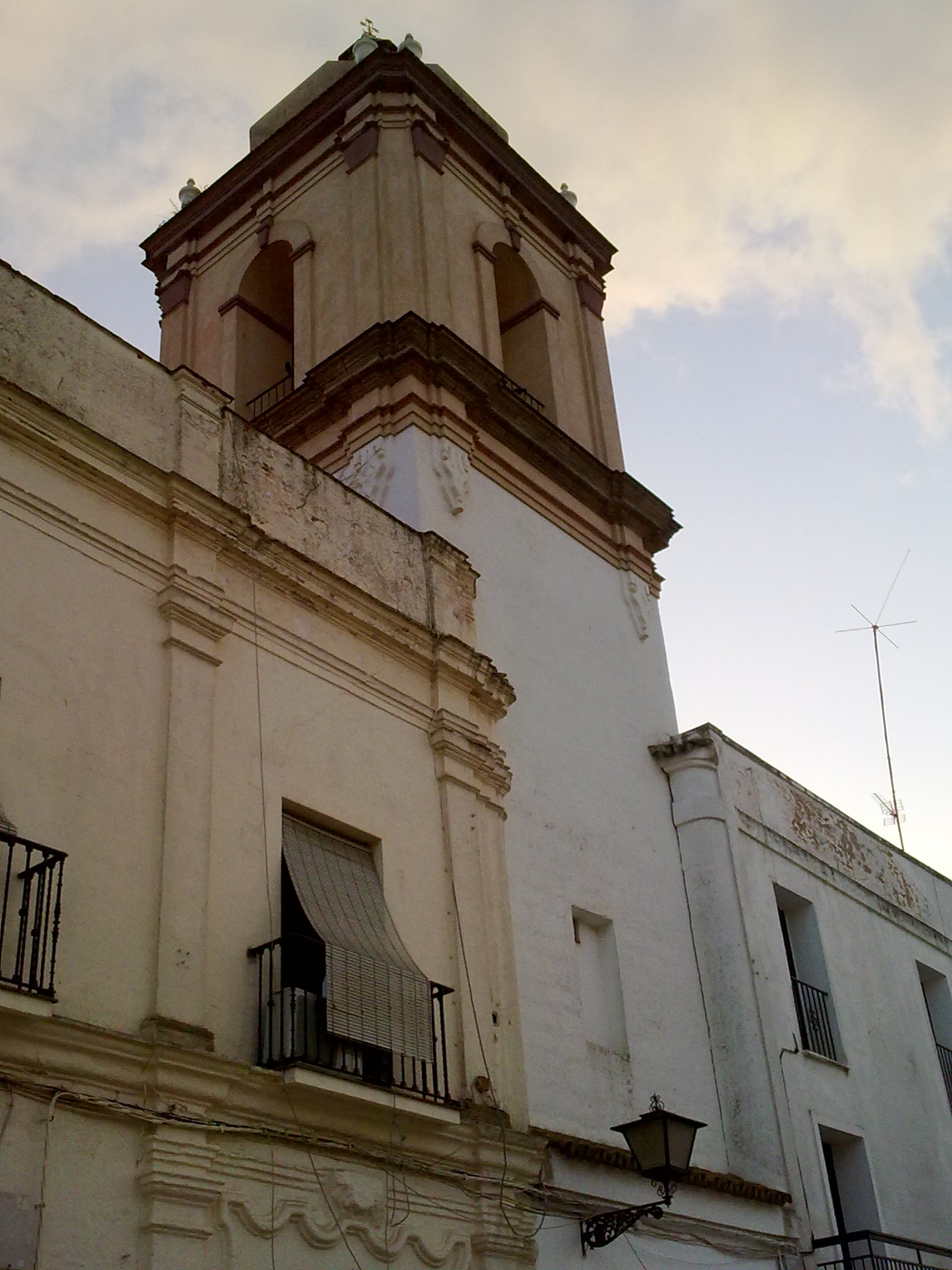
Convent of the Blessed Trinity.

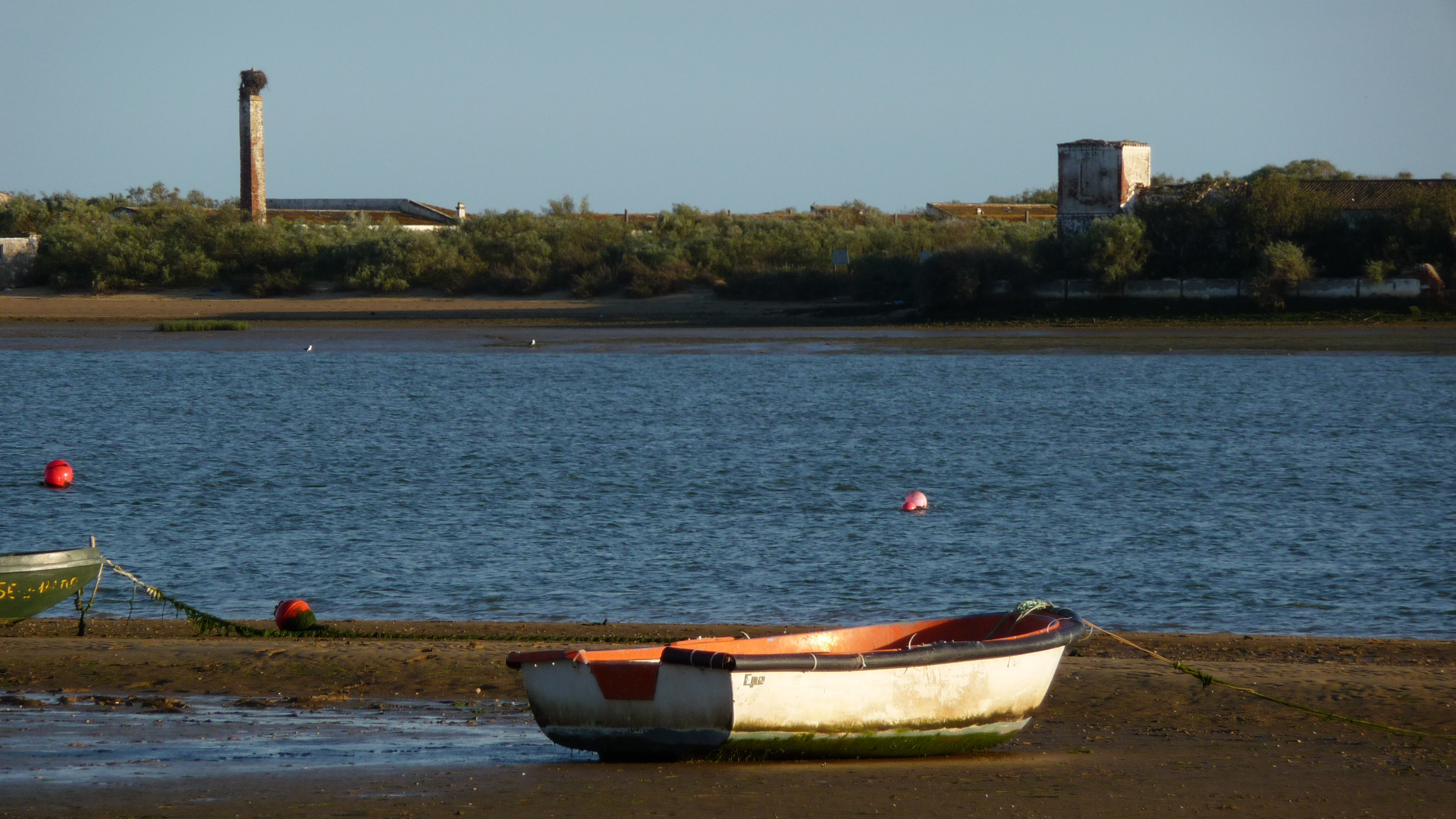
View of the former almadraba on the shore opposite El Rompido.

In the early modern era, the Order of the Blessed Virgin Mary of Mercy founded a convent in the area, as it had in other places nearby. Despite this, the local population seems to have declined. Some villages, such as San Miguel de Arca de Buey (close to present-day El Rompido) disappeared altogether. One cause may have been the plague epidemic of 1602.

In later centuries – especially the 18th century – population began to rise again, and Cartaya expanded greatly in size. This was despite the 1755 Lisbon earthquake, which must have caused widespread damage to local buildings (including the convent).

Between 1804 and 1808, Cartaya belonged to the maritime province of Sanlúcar de Barrameda. It remained part of the kingdom of Seville until the territorial reorganization of Spain in 1833, when it became part of the new province of Huelva.

In the late 19th century, the village of El Rompido began to develop. Although other villages had previously existed at the mouth of the Piedra, it was the development of an almadraba fishing operation that caused El Rompido to take shape. The fishery was based on the "arrow", on the other side of the river. As communications with Cartaya had to be made from the left bank of the river, families settled there and a village sprang up opposite the tuna fishery. Many of the fishermen were immigrants, especially from Portugal, who married local women. Portuguese surnames, such as Almeida or Brito, are still common in El Rompido.

In the mid 20th century, the village of Punta Umbria moved for Independence from Cartaya. Despite opposition from the municipal council, Punta Umbría became a new locality of Huelva province on 26 April 1963. Punta Umbria hoped to benefit from the growing tourism industry and proposed El Portil as a location for tourist development. Despite this, the plan approved in 1968 achieved little development.

With the arrival of democracy and the promulgation of the Spanish Constitution of 1978, the municipal council of Cartaya gained more autonomy. Since then, Cartaya has grown into one of the most populous municipalities in the province of Huelva.

== Population and urban arrangement ==
=== Centres of population ===
The three main population centres are: Cartaya itself; El Rompido (including the suburbs of Urberosa and Los Pinos); and Nuevo Portil.

Main population centres in the municipality of Cartaya
Population cores	Inhabitants	Coordenades	Distance (km)
Cartaya	18,415	37°16′59″N 7°09′17″W	0
El Rompido	1,629	37°13′04″N 7°07′20″W	8
Nuevo Portil	1,139	37°12′52″N 7°03′17″W	11

Source: INE 2010 (2009 dates), Google Earth

=== Demography ===
Population pyramid 2009
%	Males	Age	Females	%
0.65		85+		0.73
0.48		80–84		0.82
0.84		75–79		1.33
1.21		70–74		1.30
1.73		65–69		1.58
1.86		60–64		1.92
2.34		55–59		1.91
3.26		50–54		2.72
3.63		45–49		3.26
4.50		40–44		4.24
4.99		35–39		4.58
5.23		30–34		4.63
4.77		25–29		4.61
4.00		20–24		3.74
2.90		15–19		3.10
2.90		10–14		2.60
2.90		5–9		2.70
3.30		0–4		2.80

The population was 18,415 people in 2010, composed of 9,508 men and 8,907 women. Growth has been significant, with the population doubling since the end of the 1980s. The population decreased significantly in 1963 because the village of Punta Umbría was separated from Cartaya into its own locality.

Statistical exploitation of the Register. Historical series. Cartaya

Graph elaborated by: Wikipedia based on data from INE-2009

Population pyramid

The analysis of the population pyramid shows the following:

- Those aged less than 20 make up 23% of the total population.
- Those aged between 20 and 40 represent 37%
- Those aged between 40 and 60 represent 26%
- Those aged over 60 make up the remaining 14%

This population structure is typical in a modern demographic regime, with an evolution towards an aging population and a declining birth rate.

Immigrants

As of 2009, the Register office reported 3,197 foreign inhabitants. This total represents 17% of the total population, which is significantly higher than the national and regional averages. The most heavily represented nationalities are Moroccan (876 inhabitants), Romanian (1003 inhabitants) and Ecuadorian (120).

== Politics and government ==
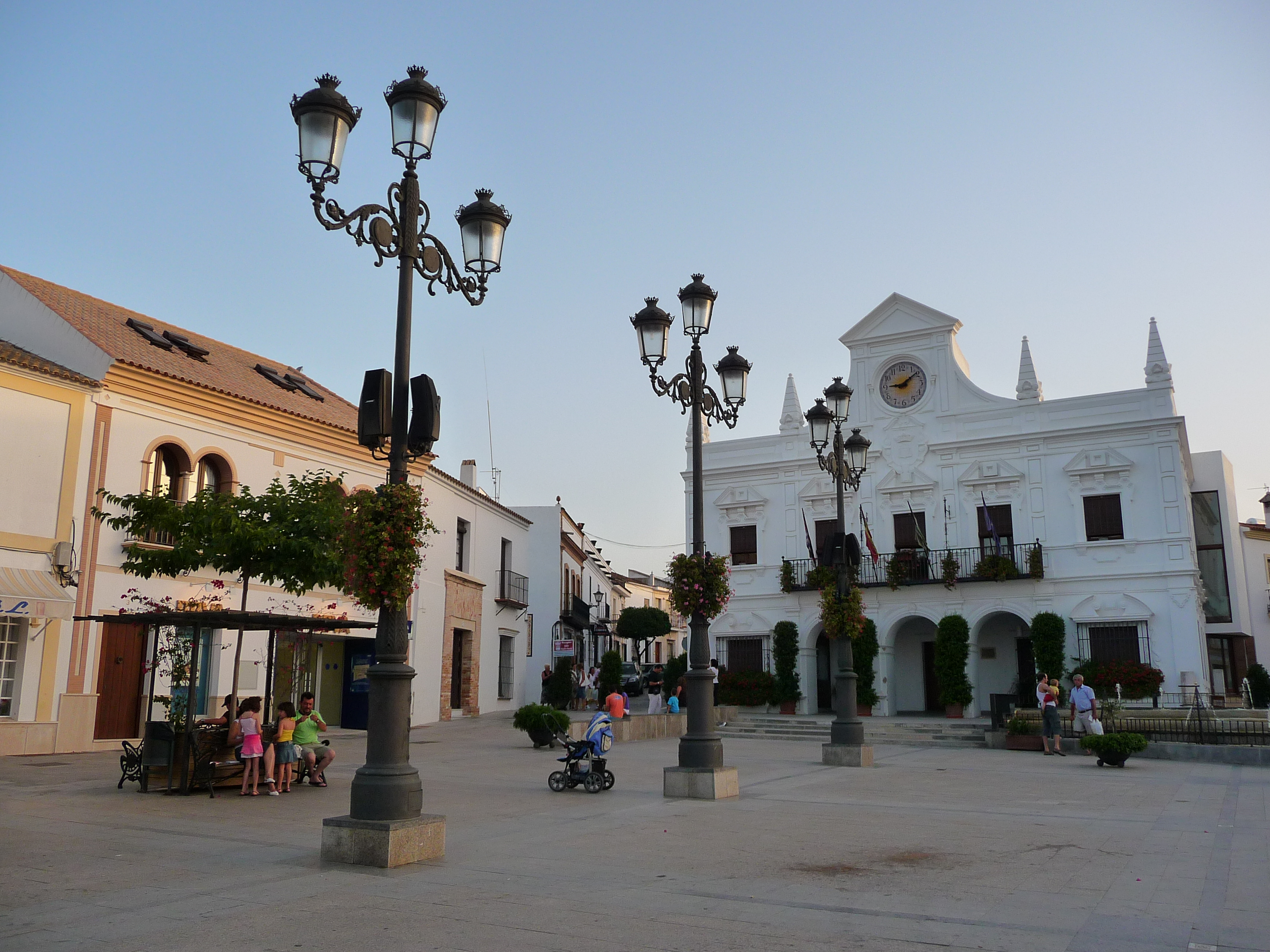
The Town Hall.

=== Local administration ===
The municipality is run by a council whose members are elected every four years by universal suffrage. The electorate is made up of all Spanish and EU citizens aged 18 or over who are registered residents of the municipality.

In accordance with the Law of the General Electoral Regime, which establishes the number of councilors on the basis of the population of the municipality, Cartaya has 17 Municipal Councilors. In the 2007 Municipal Elections, Juan Antonio Millán Jaldón was re-elected mayor. The rest of the council was made up as follows:

Municipal Elections Results in Cartaya.
Political Party	2007	
Political Party	%	Councilors
Spanish Socialist Workers' Party	57,75	11
United Left	14,50	2
Andalusian Party	13,57	2
People's Party	12,80	2

Mayors since the municipal elections of 1979
Period	Mayor's name
1979–1983	Pedro Jurado Hachero
1983–1987	Guillermo Pérez Gómez
1987–1991	Miguel Romero Palacios
1991–Current	Juan Antonio Millán Jaldón

== Economy ==
Business activity and employment

As of 2008, there were a total of 1,105 companies in the municipality. Of these, 990 employed 5 workers or fewer; 91 companies had a staff of between 6 and 19 workers; and only 24 companies employed more than 20 workers.

Cartaya also belongs to the Beturia Mancomunidad of Municipalities, which runs several initiatives to promote economic development in the region. One of these was the creation of the Cartaya School of Business (ULOPA), which aims to improve the local economy.

== See also ==
- List of municipalities in Huelva
