= 1998–99 UEFA Cup Winners' Cup =

Tournament details
- Dates: 13 August 1998 – 19 May 1999
- Teams: 32 (first round); 49 (qualifying)

Final positions
- Champions: (Italy) Lazio (1st title)
- Runners-up: (Spain) Mallorca

Tournament statistics
- Matches played: 95
- Goals scored: 273 (2.87 per match)
- Attendance: 998,396 (10,509 per match)
- Top scorer(s): Alon Mizrahi (Maccabi Haifa); 7 goals

The 1998–99 season of the UEFA Cup Winners' Cup club tournament was the last season of the competition before it was abolished. Lazio won the final against Mallorca to earn their only title in the competition. Chelsea were the defending champions, but were eliminated in the semi-finals by Mallorca.

== Teams ==
Location of teams competing in the 1998–99 UEFA Cup Winners' Cup first round.
Yellow: Did not qualify from qualifying round; Red: Qualified for first round.

First round
(England) Chelsea^{TH}	(Italy) Lazio	(Germany) MSV Duisburg	(Spain) Mallorca
(France) Paris Saint-Germain	(Netherlands) Heerenveen	(England) Newcastle United	(Portugal) Braga
(Greece) Panionios	(Czech Republic) Jablonec 97	(Norway) Vålerenga	(Austria) Ried
(Russia) Lokomotiv Moscow	(Croatia) Varteks	(Turkey) Beşiktaş	
Qualifying round
(Denmark) Copenhagen	(Switzerland) Lausanne-Sport	(Ukraine) CSKA Kyiv	(Poland) Amica Wronki
(Hungary) MTK	(Belgium) Genk	(Slovakia) Spartak Trnava	(Romania) Rapid București
(Sweden) Helsingborg	(Georgia (country)) Dinamo Batumi	(Cyprus) Apollon Limassol	(Scotland) Heart of Midlothian
(Israel) Maccabi Haifa	(Slovenia) Rudar Velenje	(Belarus) Lokomotiv-96 Vitebsk	(Iceland) Keflavík
(Finland) FC Haka	(Latvia) Liepājas Metalurgs	(Bulgaria) Levski Sofia	(North Macedonia) Vardar
(Lithuania) Ekranas	(Federal Republic of Yugoslavia) Partizan	(Moldova) Constructorul Chişinău	(Liechtenstein) FC Vaduz
(Estonia) Lantana Tallinn	(Armenia) Tsement Ararat	(Northern Ireland) Glentoran	(Malta) Hibernians
(Wales) Bangor City	(Republic of Ireland) Cork City	(Faroe Islands) GÍ	(Albania) Apolonia
(Luxembourg) Grevenmacher	(Azerbaijan) Qarabağ		

^{TH} Title Holders

== Qualifying round ==
Team 1	Agg.	Team 2	1st leg	2nd leg
Rudar Velenje (Slovenia)	2–0	(Moldova) Constructorul Chișinău	2–0	0–0
Vaduz (Liechtenstein)	0–5	(Sweden) Helsingborg	0–2	0–3
Lausanne-Sport (Switzerland)	7–2	(Armenia) Tsement Ararat	5–1	2–1
Cork City (Republic of Ireland)	2–3	(Ukraine) CSKA Kyiv	2–1	0–2
Ekranas (Lithuania)	4–5	(Cyprus) Apollon Limassol	1–2	3–3
Apolonia (Albania)	1–9	(Belgium) Genk	1–5	0–4
Bangor City (Wales)	0–3	(Finland) Haka	0–2	0–1
Levski Sofia (Bulgaria)	9–2	(Belarus) Lokomotiv-96 Vitebsk	8–1	1–1
Liepājas Metalurgs (Latvia)	4–3	(Iceland) Keflavík	4–2	0–1
Grevenmacher (Luxembourg)	2–8	(Romania) Rapid București	2–6	0–2
Lantana Tallinn (Estonia)	0–6	(Scotland) Heart of Midlothian	0–1	0–5
Amica Wronki (Poland)	5–0	(Malta) Hibernians	4–0	1–0
GÍ (Faroe Islands)	1–10	(Hungary) MTK	1–3	0–7
Glentoran (Northern Ireland)	1–3	(Israel) Maccabi Haifa	0–1	1–2
Vardar (North Macedonia)	0–3	(Slovakia) Spartak Trnava	0–1	0–2
Copenhagen (Denmark)	10–0	(Azerbaijan) Qarabağ	6–0	4–0
Partizan (Federal Republic of Yugoslavia)	2–1	(Georgia (country)) Dinamo Batumi	2–0	0–1

=== First leg ===
13 August 1998
17:00

Rudar Velenje (Slovenia)	2–0	(Moldova) Constructorul Chișinău
Vidojevič 32'; Šumnik 90'	Report

Ob Jezeru, Velenje
Attendance: 1,300
Referee: Manfred Schüttengruber (Austria)

13 August 1998
20:00

Vaduz (Liechtenstein)	0–2	(Sweden) Helsingborg
	Report	Stavrum 9'; Wibrån 67'

Rheinpark Stadion, Vaduz
Attendance: 950
Referee: Gerard Perry (Republic of Ireland)

13 August 1998
19:30

Lausanne-Sport (Switzerland)	5–1	(Armenia) Tsement Ararat
Celestini 29', 47', 59', 70'; Cavin 70'	Report	T. Hovhannisyan 36'

Stade Olympique de la Pontaise, Lausanne
Attendance: 3,500
Referee: Stefan Ormandzhiev (Bulgaria)

13 August 1998
19:30

Cork City (Republic of Ireland)	2–1	(Ukraine) CSKA Kyiv
Flanagan 20' (pen.); Coughlan 42'	Report	Revut 90'

Turners Cross, Cork
Attendance: 2,575
Referee: Dominique Tavel (Switzerland)

13 August 1998
17:00

Ekranas (Lithuania)	1–2	(Cyprus) Apollon Limassol
Stumbrys 38'	Report	Spoljaric 17'; Pittas 90'

Aukštaitija, Panevėžys
Attendance: 4,000
Referee: Mike McCurry (Scotland)

13 August 1998
17:00

Apolonia (Albania)	1–5	(Belgium) Genk
Zeqo 25'	Report	Strupar 30'; Olivieri 35'; Benjamin 40'; Oularé 65'; Horváth 79'

Selman Stërmasi Stadium, Tirana
Attendance: 2,500
Referee: Attila Hanacsek (Hungary)

13 August 1998
19:35

Bangor City (Wales)	0–2	(Finland) Haka
	Report	Niemi 40'; Salli 60'

Farrar Road, Bangor
Attendance: 1,429
Referee: Gennady Yakubovsky (Belarus)

13 August 1998
19:00

Levski Sofia (Bulgaria)	8–1	(Belarus) Lokomotiv-96 Vitebsk
Ivanov 8', 32'; Borisov 23', 44', 88'; Donev 42'; Radukanov 52'; Rahozhkin 85' (o.g.)	Report	Demenkovets 49' (pen.)

Vasil Levski National Stadium, Sofia
Attendance: 15,000
Referee: Kyros Vassaras (Greece)

13 August 1998
18:00

Liepājas Metalurgs (Latvia)	4–2	(Iceland) Keflavík
Bulders 61', 87', 88'; Magdišauskas 89'	Report	Tanasic 60'; Gylfason 90'

Daugava Stadium, Liepāja
Attendance: 4,500
Referee: Leif Sundell (Sweden)

13 August 1998
20:00

Grevenmacher (Luxembourg)	2–6	(Romania) Rapid București
Krähen 38', 72'	Report	Sabău 13'; Pancu 63'; Dulca 66'; Stanciu 69'; Lupu 77' (pen.); Mutică 82'

Op Flohr Stadion, Grevenmacher
Attendance: 1,100
Referee: Dejan Delević (Yugoslavia)

13 August 1998
18:00

Lantana Tallinn (Estonia)	0–1	(Scotland) Heart of Midlothian
	Report	Makel 21'

Viimsi Stadium, Tallinn
Attendance: 1,000
Referee: Michal Beneš (Czech Republic)

13 August 1998
20:00

Amica Wronki (Poland)	4–0	(Malta) Hibernians
Kryszałowicz 36'; Przerada 56'; Sobociński 63', 75'	Report

Amica Wronki Stadium, Wronki
Attendance: 4,600
Referee: Ihor Yarmenchuk (Ukraine)

13 August 1998
19:00

GÍ Gøta (Faroe Islands)	1–3	(Hungary) MTK
J.P. Olsen 8'	Report	Kenesei 17'; Preisinger 19'; Szekeres 90'

Svangaskarð, Toftir
Attendance: 340
Referee: Kristinn Jakobsson (Iceland)

13 August 1998
19:30

Glentoran (Northern Ireland)	0–1	(Israel) Maccabi Haifa
	Report	Mizrahi 23'

The Oval, Belfast
Attendance: 2,000
Referee: Tom Henning Øvrebø (Norway)

13 August 1998
20:00

Vardar (North Macedonia)	0–1	(Slovakia) Spartak Trnava
	Report	Ujlaky 76'

Gradski stadion, Skopje
Attendance: 9,700
Referee: Charles Agius (Malta)

13 August 1998
19:00

Copenhagen (Denmark)	6–0	(Azerbaijan) Qarabağ
Martin Nielsen 2'; Thorninger 6'; P. Nielsen 13', 40'; Goldbæk 20'; Falch 26'	Report

Parken Stadium, Copenhagen
Attendance: 5,672
Referee: Vladimir Antonov (Moldova)

13 August 1998
20:30

Partizan (Federal Republic of Yugoslavia)	2–0	(Georgia (country)) Dinamo Batumi
Bjeković 18'; Ilić 34'	Report

Partizan Stadium, Belgrade
Attendance: 8,500
Referee: Dick J.H. Van Egmond (Netherlands)

=== Second leg ===
27 August 1998
18:00

Constructorul Chișinău (Moldova)	0–0	(Slovenia) Rudar Velenje
	Report

Republican Stadium, Chișinău
Attendance: 4,500
Referee: Georgios Fassolis (Greece)

Rudar Velenje won 2–0 on aggregate.

27 August 1998
19:00

Helsingborg (Sweden)	3–0	(Liechtenstein) Vaduz
Wibrån 43'; Edman 57'; Powell 67'	Report

Olympia, Helsingborg
Attendance: 3,600
Referee: Andrei Butenko (Russia)

Helsingborg won 5–0 on aggregate.

27 August 1998
18:00

Tsement Ararat (Armenia)	1–2	(Switzerland) Lausanne-Sport
Asatryan 39'	Report	Douglas 66'; Hottiger 89'

Hrazdan Stadium, Yerevan
Attendance: 1,500
Referee: Frank De Bleeckere (Belgium)

Lausanne-Sport won 7–2 on aggregate.

27 August 1998
19:00

CSKA Kyiv (Ukraine)	2–0	(Republic of Ireland) Cork City
Tsykhmeystruk 40'; Leonenko 56'	Report

Dynamo Stadium, Kyiv (Note: CSKA Kyiv played their home matches at Dynamo Stadium, Kyiv, instead of their regular stadium, CSK ZSU Stadium, Kyiv, as it did not meet UEFA requirements.)
Attendance: 6,000
Referee: Željko Širić (Croatia)

CSKA Kyiv won 3–2 on aggregate.

27 August 1998
20:00

Apollon Limassol (Cyprus)	3–3	(Lithuania) Ekranas
Spoljaric 52' (pen.), 89' (pen.); Kavazis 60'	Report	Vilėniškis 6', 9'; Varnas 90'

Tsirio Stadium, Limassol
Attendance: 6,000
Referee: Bernard Saules (France)

Apollon Limassol won 5–4 on aggregate.

27 August 1998
20:15

Genk (Belgium)	4–0	(Albania) Apolonia
Oularé 4'; N'Sumbu 83'; Strupar 85', 90'	Report

Thyl Geyselinck, Genk
Attendance: 3,982
Referee: John Ashman (Wales)

Genk won 9–1 on aggregate.

27 August 1998
19:00

Haka (Finland)	1–0	(Wales) Bangor City
Ruhanen 29'	Report

Tehtaan kenttä, Valkeakoski
Attendance: 2,451
Referee: Sergejs Braga (Latvia)

Haka won 3–0 on aggregate.

27 August 1998
19:00

Lokomotiv-96 Vitebsk (Belarus)	1–1	(Bulgaria) Levski Sofia
Sivkov 90'	Report	Lazarov 56'

Dinamo Stadium, Minsk
Attendance: 750
Referee: Vladimír Hriňák (Slovakia)

Levski Sofia won 9–2 on aggregate.

27 August 1998
17:30

Keflavík (Iceland)	1–0	(Latvia) Liepājas Metalurgs
H. Jónsson 29'	Report

Keflavíkurvöllur, Keflavík
Attendance: 503
Referee: Jon Skjervold (Norway)

Liepājas Metalurgs won 4–3 on aggregate.

27 August 1998
18:00

Rapid București (Romania)	2–0	(Luxembourg) Grevenmacher
Pancu 53', 88'	Report

Stadionul Giulești-Valentin Stănescu, Bucharest
Attendance: 7,160
Referee: Lawrence Sammut (Malta)

Rapid București won 8–2 on aggregate.

27 August 1998
19:30

Heart of Midlothian (Scotland)	5–0	(Estonia) Lantana Tallinn
Hamilton 18'; Fulton 29'; McCann 41'; Flögel 75'; Holmes 90'	Report

Tynecastle Stadium, Edinburgh
Attendance: 15,053
Referee: Jan Wegereef (Netherlands)

Heart of Midlothian won 6–0 on aggregate.

27 August 1998
20:00

Hibernians (Malta)	0–1	(Poland) Amica Wronki
	Report	Kryszałowicz 70'

Hibernians Stadium, Paola
Attendance: 113
Referee: Graham Barber (England)

Amica Wronki won 5–0 on aggregate.

27 August 1998
20:00

MTK (Hungary)	7–0	(Faroe Islands) GÍ Gøta
Kenesei 16', 71', 76'; Preisinger 34'; Halmai 37'; Illés 62'; Balaskó 73'	Report

Hidegkuti Nándor Stadion, Budapest
Attendance: 1,500
Referee: Otar Guntadze (Georgia)

MTK won 10–1 on aggregate.

27 August 1998
18:00

Maccabi Haifa (Israel)	2–1	(Northern Ireland) Glentoran
Mizrahi 16' (pen.), 81' (pen.)	Report	Batey 42'

Kiryat Eliezer Stadium, Haifa
Attendance: 2,499
Referee: Serhiy Tatulian (Ukraine)

Maccabi Haifa won 3–1 on aggregate.

27 August 1998
19:00

Spartak Trnava (Slovakia)	2–0	(North Macedonia) Vardar
Tittel 83'; Luis Gomes 85'	Report

Štadión Antona Malatinského, Trnava
Attendance: 10,014
Referee: Romans Lajuks (Latvia)

Spartak Trnava won 3–0 on aggregate.

27 August 1998
18:00

Qarabağ (Azerbaijan)	0–4	(Denmark) Copenhagen
	Report	Jensen 64'; P. Nielsen 68'; D. Nielsen 75', 84'

Tofiq Bahramov Stadium, Baku
Attendance: 1,500
Referee: Henri Diederich (Luxembourg)

Copenhagen won 10–0 on aggregate.

27 August 1998
18:00

Dinamo Batumi (Georgia (country))	1–0	(Federal Republic of Yugoslavia) Partizan
Sichinava 28'	Report

Tsentral Stadium, Batumi
Attendance: 10,300
Referee: Pasquale Rodomonti (Italy)

Partizan won 2–1 on aggregate.

== First round ==
Team 1	Agg.	Team 2	1st leg	2nd leg
CSKA Kyiv (Ukraine)	1–5	(Russia) Lokomotiv Moscow	0–2	1–3
Liepājas Metalurgs (Latvia)	0–4	(Portugal) Braga	0–0	0–4
Ried (Austria)	3–0	(Hungary) MTK Hungária	2–0	1–0
Paris Saint-Germain (France)	3–4	(Israel) Maccabi Haifa	1–1	2–3
Panionios (Greece)	5–1	(Finland) Haka	2–0	3–1
Apollon Limassol (Cyprus)	3–3 (4–3 p)	(Czech Republic) Jablonec 97	2–1	1–2 (aet)
Lazio (Italy)	3–3 (a)	(Switzerland) Lausanne-Sport	1–1	2–2
Newcastle United (England)	2–2 (a)	(Federal Republic of Yugoslavia) Partizan	2–1	0–1
Chelsea (England)	1–0	(Sweden) Helsingborg	1–0	0–0
Levski Sofia (Bulgaria)	1–6	(Denmark) Copenhagen	0–2	1–4
Rapid București (Romania)	2–2 (a)	(Norway) Vålerenga	2–2	0–0
Beşiktaş (Turkey)	4–2	(Slovakia) Spartak Trnava	3–0	1–2
Heerenveen (Netherlands)	4–1	(Poland) Amica Wronki	3–1	1–0
Rudar Velenje (Slovenia)	0–2	(Croatia) Varteks	0–1	0–1
MSV Duisburg (Germany)	1–6	(Belgium) Genk	1–1	0–5
Heart of Midlothian (Scotland)	1–2	(Spain) Mallorca	0–1	1–1

=== First leg ===
17 September 1998
19:00

CSKA Kyiv (Ukraine)	0–2	(Russia) Lokomotiv Moscow
	Report	Kharlachyov 24'; Janashia 51'

Dynamo Stadium, Kyiv
Attendance: 4,500
Referee: Eyal Zur (Israel)

17 September 1998
20:00

Liepājas Metalurgs (Latvia)	0–0	(Portugal) Braga
	Report

Daugava Stadium, Liepāja
Attendance: 5,150
Referee: Milan Mitrović (Slovenia)

17 September 1998
18:00

Ried (Austria)	2–0	(Hungary) MTK Hungária
Strafner 19'; Brunmayr 64'	Report

Stadion der Stadt Ried, Ried
Attendance: 4,500
Referee: Iouri Baskakov (Russia)

17 September 1998
20:45

Paris Saint-Germain (France)	1–1	(Israel) Maccabi Haifa
Simone 82' (pen.)	Report	Benayoun 87'

Parc des Princes, Paris
Attendance: 28,183
Referee: Herbert Fandel (Germany)

17 September 1998
17:00

Panionios (Greece)	2–0	(Finland) Haka
Haylock 36'; Robins 54'	Report

Nea Smyrni Stadium, Athens
Attendance: 4,222
Referee: Charles Agius (Malta)

17 September 1998
20:00

Apollon Limassol (Cyprus)	2–1	(Czech Republic) Jablonec 97
Kavazis 45'; Cârstea 67'	Report	Fukal 39'

Tsirio Stadium, Limassol
Attendance: 3,000
Referee: Claude Detruche (Switzerland)

17 September 1998
20:45

Lazio (Italy)	1–1	(Switzerland) Lausanne-Sport
Nedvěd 37'	Report	Douglas 54'

Stadio Olimpico, Rome
Attendance: 22,659
Referee: Dani Koren (Israel)

17 September 1998
19:45

Newcastle United (England)	2–1	(Federal Republic of Yugoslavia) Partizan
Shearer 12'; Dabizas 71'	Report	Rašović 68' (pen.)

St James' Park, Newcastle upon Tyne
Attendance: 26,599
Referee: Dick Jol (Netherlands)

17 September 1998
19:45

Chelsea (England)	1–0	(Sweden) Helsingborg
Leboeuf 43'	Report

Stamford Bridge, London
Attendance: 17,714
Referee: Juan Ansuátegui Roca (Spain)

17 September 1998
19:00

Levski Sofia (Bulgaria)	0–2	(Denmark) Copenhagen
	Report	Goldbæk 34' (pen.); K. Jensen 75'

Vasil Levski National Stadium, Sofia
Attendance: 2,860
Referee: Dick van Egmond (Netherlands)

17 September 1998
17:30

Rapid București (Romania)	2–2	(Norway) Vålerenga
Șumudică 51'; Bundea 75'		Carew 52', 88'

Stadionul Giulești-Valentin Stănescu, Bucharest
Attendance: 2,350
Referee: Zoran Arsić (Yugoslavia)

17 September 1998
20:30

Beşiktaş (Turkey)	3–0	(Slovakia) Spartak Trnava
Mehmet Özdilek 10'; Oktay 21'; Ohen 48'	Report

BJK İnönü Stadium, Istanbul
Attendance: 20,580
Referee: Tom Henning Øvrebø (Norway)

17 September 1998
20:00

Heerenveen (Netherlands)	3–1	(Poland) Amica Wronki
Talan 38'; Mitriţă 45'; Pahlplatz 67'	Report	Król 64'

Abe Lenstra Stadion, Heerenveen
Attendance: 12,100
Referee: John Mcdermott (Republic of Ireland)

17 September 1998
16:30

Rudar Velenje (Slovenia)	0–1	(Croatia) Varteks
	Report	Matas 90'

Ob Jezeru City Stadium, Velenje
Attendance: 850
Referee: Tomasz Mikulski (Poland)

17 September 1998
20:30

MSV Duisburg (Germany)	1–1	(Belgium) Genk
Wedau 83'	Report	Reini 61'

Wedaustadion, Duisburg
Attendance: 10,602
Referee: Vaclav Krondl (Czech Republic)

17 September 1998
20:00

Heart of Midlothian (Scotland)	0–1	(Spain) Mallorca
	Report	Marcelino 17'

Tynecastle Stadium, Edinburgh
Attendance: 13,573
Referee: Alfredo Trentalange (Italy)

=== Second leg ===
1 October 1998
19:00

Lokomotiv Moscow (Russia)	3–1	(Ukraine) CSKA Kyiv
Bulykin 19', 51'; Janashia 69'	Report	Bezhenar 13'

Lokomotiv Stadium, Moscow
Attendance: 4,850
Referee: Robert Sedlacek (Austria)

Lokomotiv Moscow won 5–1 on aggregate.

1 October 1998
21:30

Braga (Portugal)	4–0	(Latvia) Liepājas Metalurgs
Bruno 12' (pen.), 60'; Karoglan 35'; Silva 84'	Report

Estádio 1º de Maio, Braga
Attendance: 8,750
Referee: Roland Beck (Liechtenstein)

Braga won 4–0 on aggregate.

1 October 1998
18:30

MTK Hungária (Hungary)	0–1	(Austria) Ried
	Report	Strafner 10'

Hidegkuti Nándor Stadion, Budapest
Attendance: 2,500
Referee: Martin Ingvarsson (Sweden)

Ried won 3–0 on aggregate.

1 October 1998
20:30

Maccabi Haifa (Israel)	3–2	(France) Paris Saint-Germain
Keisi 57'; Mizrahi 77', 90'	Report	Ouédec 72'; Okocha 86'

Kiryat Eliezer Stadium, Haifa
Attendance: 10,500
Referee: Fernand Meese (Belgium)

Maccabi Haifa won 4–3 on aggregate.

1 October 1998
19:00

Haka (Finland)	1–3	(Greece) Panionios
Salli 75'	Report	Fyssas 32'; Kafalis 45'; Sapountzis 56'

Tehtaan kenttä, Valkeakoski
Attendance: 1,750
Referee: Konrad Plautz (Austria)

Panionios won 5–1 on aggregate.

1 October 1998
16:30

Jablonec 97 (Czech Republic)	2–1 (a.e.t.)	(Cyprus) Apollon Limassol
Procházka 24', 45'	Report	Themistokleous 59'
Penalties
Procházka (penalty scored); Nečas (penalty scored); Skuhravý (penalty scored); Barteska (penalty missed); Jirousek (penalty missed)	3–4	(penalty scored) Špoljarić; (penalty scored) Papavasiliou; (penalty scored) Kavazis; (penalty scored) Germanos

Chance Arena, Jablonec nad Nisou
Attendance: 3,100
Referee: Dermot Gallagher (England)

3–3 on aggregate; Apollon Limassol won on penalties.

1 October 1998
20:45

Lausanne-Sport (Switzerland)	2–2	(Italy) Lazio
Douglas 10'; Rehn 84'	Report	Salas 7'; Sérgio Conceição 26'

Stade Olympique de la Pontaise, Lausanne
Attendance: 12,500
Referee: Kyros Vassaras (Greece)

3–3 on aggregate; Lazio won on away goals.

1 October 1998
20:45

Partizan (Federal Republic of Yugoslavia)	1–0	(England) Newcastle United
Rašović 53' (pen.)	Report

Partizan Stadium, Belgrade
Attendance: 26,700
Referee: Manuel Díaz Vega (Spain)

2–2 on aggregate; Partizan won on away goals.

1 October 1998
20:00

Helsingborg (Sweden)	0–0	(England) Chelsea
	Report

Olympia, Helsingborg
Attendance: 12,348
Referee: Vladimír Hriňák (Slovakia)

Chelsea won 1–0 on aggregate.

1 October 1998
19:05

Copenhagen (Denmark)	4–1	(Bulgaria) Levski Sofia
M. Nielsen 18'; Højer 49'; Thorninger 59', 76'	Report	Lazarov 85'

Parken Stadium, Copenhagen
Attendance: 6,354
Referee: Mike McCurry (Scotland)

Copenhagen won 6–1 on aggregate.

1 October 1998
19:00

Vålerenga (Norway)	0–0	(Romania) Rapid București
	Report

Ullevaal Stadion, Oslo
Attendance: 6,257
Referee: Roman Lajcuk (Latvia)

2–2 on aggregate; Vålerenga won on away goals.

1 October 1998
19:00

Spartak Trnava (Slovakia)	2–1	(Turkey) Beşiktaş
Formanko 49'; Timko 71'	Report	Oktay 45'

Štadión Antona Malatinského, Trnava
Attendance: 6,246
Referee: Serhiy Tatulian (Ukraine)

Beşiktaş won 4–2 on aggregate.

1 October 1998
20:00

Amica Wronki (Poland)	0–1	(Netherlands) Heerenveen
	Report	D. de Nooijer 30'

Amica Wronki Stadium, Wronki
Attendance: 3,000
Referee: Gylfi Þor Orrason (Iceland)

Heerenveen won 4–1 on aggregate.

1 October 1998
15:30

Varteks (Croatia)	1–0	(Slovenia) Rudar Velenje
Kamberović 7'

Gradski Stadion, Varaždin
Attendance: 2,850
Referee: Adrian Stoica (Romania)

Varteks won 2–0 on aggregate.

1 October 1998
20:30

Genk (Belgium)	5–0	(Germany) MSV Duisburg
Oularé 12', 48'; Strupar 31'; Guðjónsson 72', 79'	Report

King Baudouin Stadium, Brussels
Attendance: 17,200
Referee: Karl-Erik Nilsson (Sweden)

The game was played in Brussels as Genk's stadium did not meet UEFA requirements.

Genk won 6–1 on aggregate.

1 October 1998
20:45

Mallorca (Spain)	1–1	(Scotland) Heart of Midlothian
Chupa López 49'	Report	Hamilton 78'

Estadio Lluís Sitjar, Palma de Mallorca
Attendance: 12,218
Referee: Hermann Albrecht (Germany)

Before the game, the Heart of Midlothian delegate complained about the non-standard goal height, and the referee measured it to be 1 centimetre lower than regulation. Heart of Midlothian agreed to play the game anyway.

Mallorca won 2–1 on aggregate.

== Second round ==
Team 1	Agg.	Team 2	1st leg	2nd leg
Lokomotiv Moscow (Russia)	3–2	(Portugal) Braga	3–1	0–1
Ried (Austria)	3–5	(Israel) Maccabi Haifa	2–1	1–4
Panionios (Greece)	4–2	(Cyprus) Apollon Limassol	3–2	1–0
Lazio (Italy)	3–2	(Federal Republic of Yugoslavia) Partizan	0–0	3–2
Chelsea (England)	2–1	(Denmark) Copenhagen	1–1	1–0
Vålerenga (Norway)	4–3	(Turkey) Beşiktaş	1–0	3–3
Heerenveen (Netherlands)	4–5	(Croatia) Varteks	2–1	2–4 (aet)
Genk (Belgium)	1–1 (a)	(Spain) Mallorca	1–1	0–0

=== First leg ===
22 October 1998
20:00

Lokomotiv Moscow (Russia)	3–1	(Portugal) Braga
Bulykin 22', 35'; Chugainov 68' (pen.)	Report	Odair 47'

Lokomotiv Stadium, Moscow
Attendance: 16,100
Referee: Charles Agius (Malta)

22 October 1998
18:30

Ried (Austria)	2–1	(Israel) Maccabi Haifa
Śliwowski 22'; Strafner 88'	Report	Mizrahi 13'

Linzer Stadion, Linz
Attendance: 5,000
Referee: Adrian Stoica (Romania)

22 October 1998
17:30

Panionios (Greece)	3–2	(Cyprus) Apollon Limassol
Sapountzis 22'; Haylock 39'; Robins 57'	Report	Spoljaric 14', 43'

Nea Smyrni Stadium, Athens
Attendance: 10,000
Referee: Roy Helge Olsen (Norway)

22 October 1998
20:45

Lazio (Italy)	0–0	(Federal Republic of Yugoslavia) Partizan
	Report

Stadio Olimpico, Rome
Attendance: 24,966
Referee: René Temmink (Netherlands)

22 October 1998
19:45

Chelsea (England)	1–1	(Denmark) Copenhagen
Desailly 90'	Report	Goldbæk 81'

Stamford Bridge, London
Attendance: 21,207
Referee: Metin Tokat (Turkey)

22 October 1998
20:00

Vålerenga (Norway)	1–0	(Turkey) Beşiktaş
Levernes 49'	Report

Bislett Stadion, Oslo
Attendance: 6,284
Referee: Sándor Puhl (Hungary)

22 October 1998
20:00

Heerenveen (Netherlands)	2–1	(Croatia) Varteks
D. de Nooijer 57'; Hansma 89'	Report	Mumlek 63'

Abe Lenstra Stadion, Heerenveen
Attendance: 12,200
Referee: Dani Koren (Israel)

22 October 1998
20:30

Genk (Belgium)	1–1	(Spain) Mallorca
Oularé 71'	Report	Dani 56'

King Baudouin Stadium, Brussels
Attendance: 24,046
Referee: Konrad Plautz (Austria)

The game was played in Brussels as Genk's home stadium did not meet UEFA requirements.

=== Second leg ===
5 November 1998
18:00

Braga (Portugal)	1–0	(Russia) Lokomotiv Moscow
Karoglan 13'	Report

Estádio Primeiro de Maio, Braga
Attendance: 10,000
Referee: Alfredo Trentalange (Italy)

Lokomotiv Moscow won 3–2 on aggregate.

5 November 1998
19:00

Maccabi Haifa (Israel)	4–1	(Austria) Ried
Mizrahi 32'; Keisi 62'; Benayoun 72'; Duro 90'	Report	Aničić 70'

Kiryat Eliezer Stadium, Haifa
Attendance: 17,100
Referee: Željko Širić (Croatia)

Maccabi Haifa won 5–3 on aggregate.

5 November 1998
18:00

Apollon Limassol (Cyprus)	0–1	(Greece) Panionios
	Report	Sapountzis 18'

Tsirion Stadium, Limassol
Attendance: 8,000
Referee: Jan Wegereef (Netherlands)

Panionios won 4–2 on aggregate.

5 November 1998
20:45

Partizan (Federal Republic of Yugoslavia)	2–3	(Italy) Lazio
Krstajić 18'; Iliev 85'	Report	Salas 43' (pen.), 76'; Stanković 67'

Partizan Stadium, Belgrade
Attendance: 32,000
Referee: Fritz Stuchlik (Austria)

Lazio won 3–2 on aggregate.

5 November 1998
20:30

Copenhagen (Denmark)	0–1	(England) Chelsea
	Report	Laudrup 32'

Parken Stadium, Copenhagen
Attendance: 25,118
Referee: Claude Colombo (France)

Chelsea won 2–1 on aggregate.

5 November 1998
20:00

Beşiktaş (Turkey)	3–3	(Norway) Vålerenga
Oktay 8', 43'; Tayfur 40'	Report	Haraldsen 63'; Kaasa 66'; Carew 73'

BJK İnönü Stadium, Istanbul
Attendance: 25,000
Referee: Edgar Steinborn (Germany)

Vålerenga won 4–3 on aggregate.

5 November 1998
14:00

Varteks (Croatia)	4–2 (a.e.t.)	(Netherlands) Heerenveen
Mumlek 67', 117'; Kamberović 80', 99'	Report	Samardžić 18' de Visser 114'

Gradski Stadion, Varaždin
Attendance: 6,000
Referee: Kyros Vassaras (Greece)

Varteks won 5–4 on aggregate.

5 November 1998
20:30

Mallorca (Spain)	0–0	(Belgium) Genk
	Report

Estadio Lluís Sitjar, Palma de Mallorca
Attendance: 14,555
Referee: Rémi Harrel (France)

Genk raised an official protest, claiming that the corner locations are too close to the fence around the pitch. It was denied.

1–1 on aggregate; Mallorca won on away goals.

== Quarter-finals ==
Team 1	Agg.	Team 2	1st leg	2nd leg
Lokomotiv Moscow (Russia)	4–0	(Israel) Maccabi Haifa	3–0	1–0
Panionios (Greece)	0–7	(Italy) Lazio	0–4	0–3
Chelsea (England)	6–2	(Norway) Vålerenga	3–0	3–2
Varteks (Croatia)	1–3	(Spain) Mallorca	0–0	1–3

=== First leg ===
4 March 1999
20:00

Lokomotiv Moscow (Russia)	3–0	(Israel) Maccabi Haifa
Janashia 48', 78', 90'	Report

Lokomotiv Stadium, Moscow
Attendance: 20,000
Referee: Ľuboš Micheľ (Slovakia)

4 March 1999
21:45

Panionios (Greece)	0–4	(Italy) Lazio
	Report	Stanković 3', 60'; Gazis 14' (o.g.); Nedvěd 63'

Nea Smyrni Stadium, Athens
Attendance: 10,175
Referee: Graham Poll (England)

4 March 1999
19:45

Chelsea (England)	3–0	(Norway) Vålerenga
Babayaro 9'; Zola 30'; Wise 85'	Report

Stamford Bridge, London
Attendance: 34,177
Referee: Günter Benkö (Austria)

4 March 1999
20:30

Varteks (Croatia)	0–0	(Spain) Mallorca
	Report

Gradski Stadion, Varaždin
Attendance: 8,970
Referee: Karl-Erik Nilsson (Sweden)

=== Second leg ===
18 March 1999
18:30

Maccabi Haifa (Israel)	0–1	(Russia) Lokomotiv Moscow
	Report	Chugainov 72' (pen.)

Kiryat Eliezer Stadium, Haifa
Attendance: 12,074
Referee: Hugh Dallas (Scotland)

Lokomotiv Moscow won 4–0 on aggregate.

18 March 1999
20:45

Lazio (Italy)	3–0	(Greece) Panionios
Nedvěd 70'; Stanković 77' de la Peña 82'	Report

Stadio Olimpico, Rome
Attendance: 20,488
Referee: Bernd Heynemann (Germany)

Lazio won 7–0 on aggregate.

18 March 1999
20:30

Vålerenga (Norway)	2–3	(England) Chelsea
Kjølner 26'; Carew 42'	Report	Vialli 13'; Lambourde 15'; Flo 32'

Ullevaal Stadion, Oslo
Attendance: 17,934
Referee: Amand Ancion (Belgium)

Chelsea won 6–2 on aggregate.

18 March 1999
20:30

Mallorca (Spain)	3–1	(Croatia) Varteks
Ibagaza 53'; Paunović 55'; Dani 75'	Report	Balajić 90'

Estadio Lluís Sitjar, Palma de Mallorca
Attendance: 16,109
Referee: Ryszard Wójcik (Poland)

Mallorca won 3–1 on aggregate.

== Semi-finals ==
Team 1	Agg.	Team 2	1st leg	2nd leg
Lokomotiv Moscow (Russia)	1–1 (a)	(Italy) Lazio	1–1	0–0
Chelsea (England)	1–2	(Spain) Mallorca	1–1	0–1

=== First leg ===
8 April 1999
20:00

Lokomotiv Moscow (Russia)	1–1	(Italy) Lazio
Janashia 61'	Report	Bokšić 77'

Lokomotiv Stadium, Moscow
Attendance: 21,828
Referee: Gilles Veissière (France)

8 April 1999
19:45

Chelsea (England)	1–1	(Spain) Mallorca
Flo 50'	Report	Dani 32'

Stamford Bridge, London
Attendance: 32,524
Referee: Dick Jol (Netherlands)

=== Second leg ===
22 April 1999
20:45

Lazio (Italy)	0–0	(Russia) Lokomotiv Moscow
	Report

Stadio Olimpico, Rome
Attendance: 32,016
Referee: Anders Frisk (Sweden)

1–1 on aggregate; Lazio won on away goals.

22 April 1999
21:00

Mallorca (Spain)	1–0	(England) Chelsea
Biagini 15'	Report

Estadio Lluís Sitjar, Palma de Mallorca
Attendance: 18,848
Referee: Hellmut Krug (Germany)

Mallorca won 2–1 on aggregate.

== Final ==
19 May 1999
19:45

Mallorca (Spain)	1–2	(Italy) Lazio
Dani 11'	Report	Vieri 7'; Nedvěd 81'

Villa Park, Birmingham
Attendance: 33,021
Referee: Günther Benkö (Austria)

== Top goalscorers ==
The top scorers from the 1998–99 UEFA Winners' Cup (including qualifying round) are as follows:

Rank	Name	Team	Goals
1	(Israel) Alon Mizrahi	(Israel) Maccabi Haifa	7
2	(Georgia (country)) Zaza Janashia	(Russia) Lokomotiv Moscow	6
3	(Guinea) Souleymane Oularé	(Belgium) Genk	5
3	(Cyprus) Milenko Spoljaric	(Cyprus) Apollon Limassol	5
5	(Russia) Dmitri Bulykin	(Russia) Lokomotiv Moscow	4
5	(Norway) John Carew	(Norway) Vålerenga	4
5	(Switzerland) Fabio Celestini	(Switzerland) Lausanne-Sport	4
5	(Spain) Dani	(Spain) Mallorca	4
5	(Hungary) Krisztián Kenesei	(Hungary) MTK	4
5	(Czech Republic) Pavel Nedvěd	(Italy) Lazio	4
5	(Turkey) Oktay Derelioğlu	(Turkey) Beşiktaş	4
5	(Federal Republic of Yugoslavia) Dejan Stanković	(Italy) Lazio	4
5	(Belgium) Branko Strupar	(Belgium) Genk	4

== See also ==
- 1998–99 UEFA Champions League
- 1998–99 UEFA Cup
- 1998 UEFA Intertoto Cup
