= FC Mika in European football =

Overview of FC Mika's role in European football

Mika in European football
- Club: Mika
- Most appearances: Alex (17)
- Top scorer: Armen Shahgeldyan (2)
- First entry: 2000–01 UEFA Cup
- Latest entry: 2014–15 UEFA Europa League

Mika is an Armenian football club based in Yerevan, Armenia.

== History ==
=== 2000's ===
Mika first qualified for European competitions in 2000 after winning the 2000 Armenian Cup against Zvartnots-AAL, and entering the 2000–01 UEFA Cup. Here they were drawn against Rapid București where they were beaten 3–0 in Bucharest on 10 August 2000, before winning the return leg 1–0 on 24 August 2000, played at the Gyumri City Stadium in Gyumri, thanks to a goal from Samvel Nikolyan.

After retaining the Armenian Cup by winning the 2001 edition, Mika again entered the UEFA Cup during the 2001–02 season, this time drawing Brașov. After losing the 1st leg 5–1 in Brașov, Mika lost the 2nd leg 0–2 at their Mika Stadium in Yerevan, to go out 1–7 on aggregate.

=== Matches ===
As of match played 10 July 2014

Season	Competition	Round	Opponent	Home	Away	Aggregate
2000–01	UEFA Cup	QR	(Romania) Rapid București	1–0	0–3	1–3
2001–02	UEFA Cup	QR	(Romania) Brașov	0–2	1–5	1–7
2004–05	UEFA Cup	QR	(Hungary) Budapest Honvéd	0–1	1–1	1–2
2005–06	UEFA Cup	QR	(Germany) Mainz 05	0–0	0–4	0–4
2006–07	UEFA Cup	QR	(Switzerland) Young Boys	1–3	0–1	1–4
2007–08	UEFA Cup	1QR	(Hungary) MTK Budapest	1–0	1–2	2–2 (a)
2007–08	UEFA Cup	2QR	(Slovakia) Artmedia Bratislava	2–1	0–2	2–3
2008	UEFA Intertoto Cup	R1	(Moldova) Tiraspol	2–2	0–0	2–2 (a)
2009–10	UEFA Europa League	1QR	(Sweden) Helsingborg	1–1	1–3	2–4
2010–11	UEFA Europa League	2QR	(North Macedonia) Rabotnički	0–0	0–1	0–1
2011–12	UEFA Europa League	2QR	(Norway) Vålerenga	0–1	0–1	0–2
2013–14	UEFA Europa League	1QR	(Montenegro) Rudar Pljevlja	1–1	0–1	0–1
2014–15	UEFA Europa League	1QR	(Croatia) RNK Split	1–1	0–2	1–3

== Player statistics ==
=== Appearances ===
As of match played 10 July 2014

	Name	Years	UEFA Cup	UEFA Europa League	UEFA Intertoto Cup	Total	Ratio
1	(Armenia) Alex	2006-2015	6 (1)	1 (0)	10 (0)	17 (1)	0.06
2	(Armenia) Hrachya Mikaelyan	2004-2010	10 (0)	1 (0)	2 (0)	13 (0)	0
3	(Armenia) Armen Petikyan	2000-2002, 2003, 2005-2007	11 (0)	(-)	0 (-)	11 (0)	0
3	(Armenia) Narek Beglaryan	2005-2012, 2012–2013, 2014–2015	2 (0)	2 (0)	7 (0)	11 (0)	0
3	(Armenia) Armen Petrosyan	2008-2015	(-)	2 (0)	9 (0)	11 (0)	0
6	(Armenia) Armen Shahgeldyan	2001-2002, 2004, 2005-2007	10 (2)	(-)	(-)	10 (2)	0.2
7	(Armenia) Felix Hakobyan	2001-2008	7 (0)	2 (0)	(-)	9 (0)	0
7	(Armenia) David Grigoryan	2000-2004, 2007–2009, 2014–2015	7 (1)	2 (0)	(-)	9 (1)	0.11
7	(Armenia) Gevorg Poghosyan	2007-2015	(-)	2 (0)	7 (0)	9 (0)	0
10	(Armenia) Arsen Meloyan	2004-2007	8 (0)	(-)	(-)	8 (0)	0
10	(Armenia) Tigran Davtyan	2005-2007	8 (0)	(-)	(-)	8 (0)	0
10	(Russia) Nikita Fursin	2006-2007, 2009	6 (0)	(-)	2 (0)	8 (0)	0
10	(Armenia) Aghvan Mkrtchyan	2009-2013	(-)	(-)	8 (0)	8 (0)	0
14	(Armenia) Artyom Adamyan	2003-2007	7 (1)	(-)	(-)	7 (1)	0.14
15	(Armenia) Artashes Adamyan	2003-2006	6 (0)	(-)	(-)	6 (0)	0
15	(Armenia) Artashes Antonyan	2005-2008	6 (0)	(-)	(-)	6 (0)	0
15	(Brazil) Thiago	2007-2011	4 (0)	2 (0)	(-)	6 (0)	0
15	(Brazil) Cléber	2006-2007	6 (0)	(-)	(-)	6 (0)	0
15	(Spain) Pedro López	2008-2011	(-)	(-)	6 (0)	6 (0)	0
15	(Brazil) Ednei	2009-2012	(-)	(-)	6 (1)	6 (1)	0.17
21	(Armenia) Gevorg Kasparov	2004, 2010–2012, 2014-2015	0 (0)	(-)	4 (0)	5 (0)	0
22	(Armenia) Armen Markosyan	2000-2002	4 (0)	(-)	(-)	4 (0)	0
22	(Armenia) Hovhannes Tahmazyan	2004-2007	4 (0)	(-)	(-)	4 (0)	0
22	(Serbia) Ivan Ristić	2007	4 (0)	(-)	(-)	4 (0)	0
22	(Brazil) Cléber Rodrigues	2007	4 (1)	(-)	(-)	1 (1)	0.25
22	(Ivory Coast) Boti Goa	2008-2011, 2012	(-)	(-)	4 (0)	4 (0)	0
22	(Armenia) Alexander Tadevosyan	2009-2011, 2012	(-)	(-)	4 (0)	4 (0)	0
22	(Armenia) Hrayr Mkoyan	2010-2011	(-)	(-)	4 (0)	4 (0)	0
22	(Armenia) Simyon Muradyan	2011-2013	(-)	(-)	4 (0)	4 (0)	0
22	(Armenia) Andranik Voskanyan	2008-2015	(-)	(-)	4 (0)	4 (0)	0
22	(Armenia) Vardges Satumyan	2011-2015	(-)	(-)	4 (0)	4 (0)	0
22	(Armenia) Vardan Movsisyan	2011-2015, 2016-2017	(-)	(-)	4 (0)	4 (0)	0
33	(Armenia) Arsen Dallakyan	2000-2002	3 (0)	(-)	(-)	3 (0)	0
33	(Armenia) Artavazd Karamyan	2000, 2001	3 (0)	(-)	(-)	3 (0)	0
33	(Armenia) Grigor Mkrtchyan	2000-2003	3 (0)	(-)	(-)	3 (0)	0
33	(Armenia) Arman Karamyan	2000, 2001	3 (0)	(-)	(-)	3 (0)	0
33	(Armenia) Abraham Khashmanyan	2000-2001	3 (0)	(-)	(-)	3 (0)	0
33	(Armenia) Varazdat Avetisyan	2000-2001	3 (0)	(-)	(-)	3 (0)	0
33	(Armenia) Karen Muradyan	2000-2004, 2007	3 (0)	(-)	(-)	3 (0)	0
33	(Armenia) Vardan Hovhannisyan	2004-2006	3 (0)	(-)	(-)	3 (0)	0
33	(Ukraine) Maksym Morozov	2005, 2009	2 (0)	(-)	1 (0)	3 (0)	0
33	(Brazil) Tales	2007	3 (0)	(-)	(-)	3 (0)	0
33	(Armenia) Stepan Hakobyan	2004-2005, 2007-2011	(-)	2 (1)	1 (0)	3 (1)	0.33
33	(Spain) Ulises Cano	2009-2011	(-)	(-)	3 (1)	3 (1)	0.33
33	(Armenia) Aram Voskanyan	2003-2004, 2008–2010, 2010–2011	(-)	(-)	3 (0)	3 (0)	0
33	(Armenia) Alik Arakelyan	2012-2015	(-)	(-)	3 (0)	3 (0)	0
33	(Armenia) Rafael Ghazaryan	2010-2015	(-)	(-)	3 (1)	3 (1)	0.33
33	(Armenia) Gor Poghosyan	2011-2016	(-)	(-)	3 (0)	3 (0)	0
49	(Armenia) Harutyun Abrahamyan	2000-2001	2 (0)	(-)	(-)	2 (0)	0
49	(Armenia) Aram Avanesyan	2000-2002	2 (0)	(-)	(-)	2 (0)	0
49	(Armenia) Vardan Minasyan	2000-2001	2 (0)	(-)	(-)	2 (0)	0
49	(Armenia) Samvel Nikolyan	2000-2001	2 (1)	(-)	(-)	2 (1)	0.5
49	(Armenia) Slavik Sukiasyan	2001	2 (0)	(-)	(-)	2 (0)	0
49	(Armenia) Rafael Nazaryan	2001	2 (1)	(-)	(-)	2 (1)	0.5
49	(Armenia) Andrey Bulanov	2001-2002	2 (0)	(-)	(-)	2 (0)	0
49	(Armenia) Arthur Mkrtchyan	2000-2001	2 (0)	(-)	(-)	2 (0)	0
49	(Armenia) Hayk Harutyunyan	2001-2002	2 (0)	(-)	(-)	2 (0)	0
49	(Armenia) Arsen Ayvazyan	2004	2 (0)	(-)	(-)	2 (0)	0
49	(Armenia) Grigor Grigoryan	2004	2 (0)	(-)	(-)	2 (0)	0
49	(Armenia) Garnik Hovhannisyan	2004-2005, 2008-2009	2 (0)	(-)	(-)	2 (0)	0
49	(Turkmenistan) Ýuriý Magdiýew	2005	2 (0)	(-)	(-)	2 (0)	0
49	(Armenia) Karen Asatryan	2005	2 (0)	(-)	(-)	2 (0)	0
49	(Russia) Pavel Yushkov	2006	2 (0)	(-)	(-)	2 (0)	0
49	(Georgia (country)) Zaza Sakhokia	2008	(-)	2 (0)	(-)	2 (0)	0
49	(Armenia) Arkadi Chilingaryan	2008	(-)	2 (0)	(-)	2 (0)	0
49	(Armenia) Khoren Veranyan	2008-2009	(-)	2 (1)	(-)	2 (1)	0.5
49	(Russia) Maksim Fyodorov	2008	(-)	2 (0)	(-)	2 (0)	0
49	(Armenia) Artur Harutyunyan	2009-2011	(-)	(-)	2 (0)	2 (0)	0
49	(Armenia) Ara Hakobyan	2009	(-)	(-)	2 (0)	2 (0)	0
49	(Lithuania) Saulius Klevinskas	2010	(-)	(-)	2 (0)	2 (0)	0
49	(Brazil) Edílson	2010-2011	(-)	(-)	2 (0)	2 (0)	0
49	(Lithuania) Mindaugas Grigalevičius	2010	(-)	(-)	2 (0)	2 (0)	0
49	(Moldova) Constantin Mandrîcenco	2011	(-)	(-)	2 (0)	2 (0)	0
49	(Armenia) Areg Azatyan	2011-2014	(-)	(-)	2 (0)	2 (0)	0
49	(Armenia) Arman Hakobyan	2013-2015	(-)	(-)	2 (0)	2 (0)	0
49	(Armenia) Artur Adamyan	2012-2015	(-)	(-)	2 (0)	2 (0)	0
49	(Armenia) Sargis Shahinyan	2011-2013, 2014-2015	(-)	(-)	2 (0)	2 (0)	0
49	(Armenia) Tigran Barseghyan	2014-2015	(-)	(-)	2 (0)	2 (0)	0
49	(Armenia) Sargis Karapetyan	2013-2015	(-)	(-)	2 (1)	2 (1)	0.5
49	(Armenia) Hayk Voskanyan	2014-2015	(-)	(-)	2 (0)	2 (0)	0
81	(Armenia) Artur Kocharyan	2000	1 (0)	(-)	(-)	1 (0)	0
81	(Armenia) Albert Atshemyan	2000-2001	1 (0)	(-)	(-)	1 (0)	0
81	(Armenia) Sargis Nordikyan	2000-2001	1 (0)	(-)	(-)	1 (0)	0
81	(Armenia) Gor Hovhannisyan	2000-2001	1 (0)	(-)	(-)	1 (0)	0
81	(Armenia) Karen Grigoryan	2001-2002	1 (0)	(-)	(-)	1 (0)	0
81	(Armenia) Arsen Simonyan	2001-2002	1 (0)	(-)	(-)	1 (0)	0
81	(Armenia) Tigran Hovhannisyan	2004	1 (0)	(-)	(-)	1 (0)	0
81	(Armenia) Artak Hovhannisyan	2004	1 (0)	(-)	(-)	1 (0)	0
81	(Armenia) Araik Markosyan	2004	1 (0)	(-)	(-)	1 (0)	0
81	(Armenia) Vardan Bichakhchyan	2004	1 (0)	(-)	(-)	1 (0)	0
81	(Russia) Sergey Shevchenko	2005	1 (0)	(-)	(-)	1 (0)	0
81	(Armenia) Hovhannes Harutyunyan	2004-2005	1 (0)	(-)	(-)	1 (0)	0
81	(Brazil) Acleisson	2007	1 (0)	(-)	(-)	1 (0)	0
81	(Armenia) Virab Meytikhanyan	2005-2009	1 (0)	(-)	(-)	1 (0)	0
81	(Armenia) Rafael Safaryan	2008-2009	(-)	1 (0)	(-)	1 (0)	0
81	(Brazil) Modesto da Silva	2008-2009	(-)	1 (0)	(-)	1 (0)	0
81	(Armenia) Karen Avoyan	2007-2009	(-)	1 (0)	(-)	1 (0)	0
81	(Tajikistan) Dilshod Vasiyev	2008	(-)	1 (0)	(-)	1 (0)	0
81	(Armenia) Hayk Ishkhanyan	2009-2011, 2013	0 (-)	(-)	1 (0)	1 (0)	0
81	(Armenia) Hovhannes Grigoryan	2011	0 (-)	(-)	1 (0)	1 (0)	0
81	(Armenia) Armen Khachatryan	2012-2014	0 (-)	(-)	1 (0)	1 (0)	0
81	(Armenia) Armen Fishyan	2012-2016	0 (-)	(-)	1 (0)	1 (0)	0

=== Goalscorers ===
As of match played 10 July 2014

	Name	Years	UEFA Cup	UEFA Intertoto Cup	UEFA Europa League	Total	Ratio
1	(Armenia) Armen Shahgeldyan	2001-2002, 2004, 2005-2007	2 (10)	(-)	(-)	2 (10)	0.2
2	(Armenia) Samvel Nikolyan	2000-2001	1 (2)	(-)	(-)	1 (2)	0.5
2	(Armenia) Rafael Nazaryan	2001	1 (2)	(-)	(-)	1 (2)	0.5
2	(Armenia) David Grigoryan	2000-2004, 2007–2009, 2014–2015	1 (7)	0 (2)	(-)	1 (9)	0.11
2	(Brazil) Cléber Rodrigues	2007	1 (4)	(-)	(-)	1 (4)	0.25
2	(Armenia) Artyom Adamyan	2003-2007	1 (7)	(-)	(-)	1 (7)	0.14
2	(Armenia) Alex	2006-2015	1 (6)	0 (1)	0 (10)	1 (17)	0.06
2	(Armenia) Khoren Veranyan	2008-2009	(-)	1 (2)	(-)	1 (2)	0.5
2	(Armenia) Stepan Hakobyan	2004-2005, 2007-2011	(-)	1 (2)	0 (1)	1 (3)	0.33
2	(Spain) Ulises Cano	2009-2011	(-)	(-)	1 (3)	1 (3)	0.33
2	(Brazil) Ednei	2009-2012	(-)	(-)	1 (6)	1 (6)	0.17
2	(Armenia) Sargis Karapetyan	2013-2015	(-)	(-)	1 (2)	1 (2)	0.5
2	(Armenia) Rafael Ghazaryan	2010-2015	(-)	(-)	1 (3)	1 (3)	0.33

=== Clean sheets ===
As of match played 10 July 2014

	Name	Years	UEFA Cup	UEFA Intertoto Cup	UEFA Europa League	Total	Ratio
1	(Armenia) Felix Hakobyan	2001-2008	2 (7)	1 (2)	(-)	3 (9)	0.33
2	(Armenia) Harutyun Abrahamyan	2000-2001	1 (2)	(-)	(-)	1 (2)	0.5
2	(Lithuania) Saulius Klevinskas	2010	(-)	(-)	1 (2)	1 (2)	0.5
4	(Armenia) Slavik Sukiasyan	2001-2002	0 (2)	(-)	(-)	0 (2)	0
4	(Armenia) Gevorg Kasparov	2004, 2010–2012, 2014-2015	0 (1)	(-)	0 (4)	0 (5)	0
4	(Armenia) Garnik Hovhannisyan	2004-2006, 2008-2009	0 (2)	(-)	(-)	0 (2)	0
4	(Armenia) Artur Harutyunyan	2009-2011	(-)	(-)	0 (2)	0 (2)	0
4	(Armenia) Armen Fishyan	2012-2016	(-)	(-)	0 (1)	0 (1)	0
4	(Armenia) Armen Khachatryan	2012-2013	(-)	(-)	0 (1)	0 (1)	0

== Overall record ==
=== By competition ===
As of match played 10 July 2014

Competition	GP	W	D	L	GF	GA	+/-
UEFA Cup	14	3	2	9	8	25	–17
UEFA Europa League	10	0	4	6	4	12	–8
UEFA Intertoto Cup	2	0	2	0	2	2	0
Total	26	3	8	15	14	39	−25

=== By country ===
As of match played 10 July 2014

Country	Pld	W	D	L	GF	GA	GD	Win%
Croatia	2	0	1	1	1	3	−2	0.00
Germany	2	0	1	1	0	4	−4	0.00
Hungary	4	1	1	2	3	4	−1	25.00
Moldova	2	0	2	0	2	2	+0	0.00
Montenegro	2	0	1	1	1	2	−1	0.00
North Macedonia	2	0	1	1	0	1	−1	0.00
Norway	2	0	0	2	0	2	−2	0.00
Romania	4	1	0	3	2	10	−8	25.00
Slovakia	2	1	0	1	2	3	−1	50.00
Sweden	2	0	1	1	2	4	−2	0.00
Switzerland	2	0	0	2	1	4	−3	0.00

=== By club ===
As of match played 10 July 2014

Opponent	Played	Won	Drawn	Lost	For	Against	Difference	Ratio
(Slovakia) Artmedia Petržalka	2	1	0	1	2	3	−1	50.00
(Romania) Brașov	2	0	0	2	1	7	−6	0.00
(Hungary) Budapest Honvéd	2	0	1	1	1	2	−1	0.00
(Sweden) Helsingborg	2	0	1	1	1	3	−2	0.00
(Germany) Mainz 05	2	0	1	1	0	4	−4	0.00
(Hungary) MTK Budapest	2	1	0	1	2	2	+0	50.00
(North Macedonia) Rabotnički	2	0	1	1	0	1	−1	0.00
(Romania) Rapid București	2	1	0	1	1	3	−2	50.00
(Croatia) RNK Split	2	0	1	1	1	3	−2	0.00
(Montenegro) Rudar Pljevlja	2	0	1	1	1	2	−1	0.00
(Moldova) Tiraspol	2	0	2	0	2	2	+0	0.00
(Switzerland) Young Boys	2	0	0	2	1	4	−3	0.00
(Norway) Vålerenga	2	0	0	2	0	2	−2	0.00
