= 1996 UEFA European Under-21 Championship squads =

Football team member listings

This article displays the squads for the 1996 UEFA European Under-21 Championship. Only players born on or after 1 January 1973 were eligible to play. Players in bold have later been capped at full international level.

== Czech Republic ==
Head coach: Ivan Kopecký

No.	Pos.	Player	Date of birth (age)	Caps	Club
1	GK	**Radek Černý**	18 February 1974 (aged 22)		(Czech Republic) Hvězda Cheb
2	DF	**Petr Gabriel**	17 May 1973 (aged 22)		(Czech Republic) Viktoria Žižkov
3	DF	Martin Hyský	25 September 1975 (aged 20)		(Czech Republic) Slavia Prague
5	DF	**Tomáš Řepka**	22 September 1974 (aged 21)		(Czech Republic) Sparta Prague
4	DF	Jiří Skála	10 October 1973 (aged 22)		(Czech Republic) Viktoria Plzeň
15	MF	Milan Barteska	17 June 1973 (aged 22)		(Czech Republic) Jablonec
6	MF	**Martin Čížek**	9 June 1974 (aged 21)		(Czech Republic) Baník Ostrava
8	MF	**Tomáš Galásek**	15 January 1973 (aged 23)		(Czech Republic) Baník Ostrava
11	MF	Pavel Jirousek	3 June 1973 (aged 22)		(Czech Republic) Jablonec
12	MF	**Pavel Novotný**	14 September 1973 (aged 22)		(Czech Republic) Slavia Prague
7	MF	**Radek Slončík**	29 May 1973 (aged 22)		(Czech Republic) Baník Ostrava
13	MF	**Vladimír Šmicer**	24 May 1973 (aged 22)		(Czech Republic) Slavia Prague
17	MF	Jiří Vávra	6 March 1975 (aged 21)		(Czech Republic) Slavia Prague
14	FW	**Vratislav Lokvenc**	27 September 1973 (aged 22)		(Czech Republic) Sparta Prague
9	FW	**Robert Vágner**	12 May 1974 (aged 21)		(Czech Republic) Slavia Prague

== France ==
Head coach: Raymond Domenech

No.	Pos.	Player	Date of birth (age)	Caps	Club
1	GK	**Lionel Letizi**	28 May 1973 (aged 22)		(France) Nice
2	DF	**Martin Djetou**	15 December 1974 (aged 21)		(France) Strasbourg
3	DF	Jérôme Bonnissel	4 January 1973 (aged 23)		(France) Montpellier
4	DF	Florent Laville	7 August 1973 (aged 22)		(France) Lyon
5	DF	Patrick Moreau	3 November 1973 (aged 22)		(France) Bastia
6	MF	**Patrick Vieira**	23 June 1976 (aged 19)		(Italy) Milan
7	MF	**Claude Makélélé**	18 February 1973 (aged 23)		(France) Nantes
8	MF	**Vikash Dhorasoo**	10 October 1973 (aged 22)		(France) Le Havre
9	FW	**Florian Maurice**	20 May 1974 (aged 21)		(France) Lyon
10	MF	Charles-Edouard Coridon	9 April 1973 (aged 22)		(France) Guingamp
11	MF	**Robert Pires**	29 October 1973 (aged 22)		(France) Metz
12	DF	Yannick Rott	27 September 1974 (aged 21)		(France) Strasbourg
13	MF	**Vincent Candela**	24 October 1973 (aged 22)		(France) Guingamp
14	MF	**Olivier Dacourt**	25 September 1974 (aged 21)		(France) Strasbourg
15	FW	**Tony Vairelles**	10 April 1973 (aged 22)		(France) Lens
16	GK	Vincent Fernandez	31 January 1975 (aged 21)		(France) Châteauroux
17	FW	Pierre-Yves André	14 May 1974 (aged 21)		(France) Rennes
18	FW	**Sylvain Wiltord**	10 May 1974 (aged 21)		(France) Rennes

== Germany ==
Head coach: Hannes Löhr

No.	Pos.	Player	Date of birth (age)	Caps	Club
1	GK	Uwe Gospodarek	6 August 1973 (aged 22)		(Germany) VfL Bochum
2	DF	Uwe Ehlers	8 March 1975 (aged 21)		(Germany) Hansa Rostock
4	DF	Thomas Hengen	22 September 1974 (aged 21)		(Germany) 1. FC Kaiserslautern
3	DF	Stefan Müller	8 March 1974 (aged 22)		(Germany) SC Freiburg
14	DF	**Jens Nowotny**	11 January 1974 (aged 22)		(Germany) Karlsruher SC
6	DF	Oliver Schmidt	14 September 1973 (aged 22)		(Germany) Hertha BSC
19	DF	**René Schneider**	1 February 1973 (aged 23)		(Germany) Hansa Rostock
5	MF	René Beuchel	7 July 1973 (aged 22)		(Germany) Eintracht Frankfurt
11	MF	Matthias Hagner	15 August 1974 (aged 21)		(Germany) Eintracht Frankfurt
8	MF	**Christian Nerlinger**	21 March 1973 (aged 22)		(Germany) Bayern Munich
16	MF	Andreas Neuendorf	9 February 1975 (aged 21)		(Germany) Bayer Leverkusen
18	MF	**Carsten Ramelow**	20 March 1974 (aged 21)		(Germany) Bayer Leverkusen
14	MF	**Lars Ricken**	10 July 1976 (aged 19)		(Germany) Borussia Dortmund
20	MF	René Rydlewicz	18 July 1973 (aged 22)		(Germany) 1860 Munich
7	FW	Karsten Bäron	2 October 1973 (aged 22)		(Germany) Hamburger SV
9	FW	André Breitenreiter	24 April 1973 (aged 22)		(Germany) Hamburger SV
11	FW	Markus Feldhoff	29 August 1974 (aged 21)		(Germany) Bayer Leverkusen

== Hungary ==
Head coach: Antal Dunai

No.	Pos.	Player	Date of birth (age)	Caps	Club
1	GK	**Lajos Szűcs**	18 February 1974 (aged 22)		(Hungary) Újpest
2	DF	**János Mátyus**	20 December 1974 (aged 21)		(Hungary) Honvéd
3	DF	Zoltán Molnár	4 November 1973 (aged 22)		(Hungary) BVSC
4	DF	**Zoltán Petö**	19 September 1974 (aged 21)		(Hungary) Debrecen
14	DF	**Vilmos Sebők**	13 June 1973 (aged 22)		(Hungary) RAEC
16	DF	Csaba Szatmári	2 November 1973 (aged 22)		(Hungary) Debrecen
5	MF	**Pál Dárdai**	16 March 1976 (aged 19)		(Hungary) Pécsi
7	MF	**Tibor Dombi**	11 November 1973 (aged 22)		(Hungary) Debrecen
11	MF	**Gábor Egressy**	11 February 1974 (aged 22)		(Hungary) Újpest
13	MF	**János Hrutka**	26 October 1974 (aged 21)		(Hungary) MTK Budapest
8	MF	**Miklós Lendvai**	7 April 1975 (aged 20)		(Hungary) Zalaegerszegi
12	MF	**Krisztián Lisztes**	2 July 1976 (aged 19)		(Hungary) Ferencváros
10	MF	**Gábor Zavadszky**	10 September 1974 (aged 21)		(Hungary) Ferencváros
9	FW	**Sándor Preisinger**	11 December 1973 (aged 22)		(Hungary) Zalaegerszegi
15	FW	**Tamás Sándor**	20 June 1974 (aged 21)		(Hungary) Debrecen
17	FW	Károly Szanyó	10 November 1973 (aged 22)		(Hungary) Újpest

== Italy ==
Head coach: Cesare Maldini

No.	Pos.	Player	Date of birth (age)	Caps	Club
1	GK	Angelo Pagotto	21 November 1973 (aged 22)		(Italy) Sampdoria
2	DF	**Christian Panucci** (c)	12 April 1973 (aged 22)		(Italy) Milan
3	DF	Alessandro Pistone	27 July 1975 (aged 20)		(Italy) Internazionale
4	DF	**Fabio Cannavaro**	13 September 1973 (aged 22)		(Italy) Parma
5	DF	Fabio Galante	20 November 1973 (aged 22)		(Italy) Genoa
6	DF	Salvatore Fresi	16 January 1973 (aged 23)		(Italy) Internazionale
7	DF	**Luigi Sartor**	30 January 1975 (aged 21)		(Italy) Vicenza
8	DF	**Alessandro Nesta**	19 March 1976 (aged 19)		(Italy) Lazio
9	FW	Nicola Amoruso	29 August 1974 (aged 21)		(Italy) Padova
10	MF	Massimo Brambilla	4 March 1973 (aged 23)		(Italy) Parma
11	MF	Fabio Pecchia	24 August 1973 (aged 22)		(Italy) Napoli
12	GK	**Gianluigi Buffon**	28 January 1978 (aged 18)		(Italy) Parma
13	MF	Raffaele Ametrano	15 February 1973 (aged 23)		(Italy) Udinese
14	MF	**Damiano Tommasi**	17 May 1974 (aged 21)		(Italy) Verona
15	MF	**Alessio Tacchinardi**	23 July 1975 (aged 20)		(Italy) Juventus
16	FW	**Marco Delvecchio**	7 April 1973 (aged 22)		(Italy) Roma
17	FW	Domenico Morfeo	16 January 1976 (aged 20)		(Italy) Atalanta
18	FW	**Francesco Totti**	27 September 1976 (aged 19)		(Italy) Roma
19	FW	**Christian Vieri**	12 July 1973 (aged 22)		(Italy) Atalanta

== Portugal ==
Head coach: Nelo Vingada

No.	Pos.	Player	Date of birth (age)	Caps	Club
1	GK	Nuno Espírito Santo	25 January 1974 (aged 22)		(Portugal) Vitória Guimarães
12	GK	Paulo Costinha	22 September 1973 (aged 22)		(Portugal) Sporting CP
2	DF	Nuno Afonso	6 October 1974 (aged 21)		(Portugal) Campomaiorense
3	DF	**Beto**	3 May 1976 (aged 19)		(Portugal) Campomaiorense
4	DF	**Rui Jorge**	27 March 1973 (aged 22)		(Portugal) Porto
6	DF	Daniel Kenedy	18 February 1974 (aged 22)		(Portugal) Benfica
13	DF	**Litos**	25 February 1974 (aged 22)		(Portugal) Boavista
15	DF	Nandinho	13 October 1975 (aged 20)		(Portugal) Estrela de Vendas Novas
17	DF	**Emílio Peixe**	16 January 1973 (aged 23)		(Portugal) Sporting CP
19	DF	**João Pinto**	26 May 1973 (aged 22)		(Portugal) Porto
8	MF	Luís Andrade	30 September 1973 (aged 22)		(Portugal) Estrela da Amadora
5	MF	**Sérgio Conceição**	15 November 1974 (aged 21)		(Portugal) Felgueiras
7	MF	**José Dominguez**	16 February 1974 (aged 22)		(Portugal) Sporting CP
10	MF	Afonso Martins	11 April 1973 (aged 22)		(Portugal) Sporting CP
16	MF	**Hugo Porfírio**	28 September 1973 (aged 22)		(Portugal) União de Leiria
14	MF	**Luís Vidigal**	15 March 1973 (aged 22)		(Portugal) Sporting CP
9	FW	**Dani**	2 November 1976 (aged 19)		(England) West Ham United
11	FW	**Nuno Gomes**	5 July 1976 (aged 19)		(Portugal) Boavista

== Scotland ==
Head coach: Tommy Craig

No.	Pos.	Player	Date of birth (age)	Caps	Club
1	GK	Derek Stillie	3 December 1973 (aged 22)		(Scotland) Aberdeen
2	DF	Scott Marshall	1 May 1973 (aged 22)		(England) Arsenal
3	MF	**Jackie McNamara**	24 October 1973 (aged 22)		(Scotland) Celtic
4	DF	**Steven Pressley**	11 October 1973 (aged 22)		(Scotland) Dundee United
5	DF	**Christian Dailly**	23 October 1973 (aged 22)		(Scotland) Dundee United
6	MF	Jamie Fullarton	20 July 1974 (aged 21)		(Scotland) St Mirren
7	FW	**Stephen Crawford**	9 January 1974 (aged 22)		(Scotland) Raith Rovers
8	MF	**Charlie Miller**	18 March 1976 (aged 19)		(Scotland) Rangers
9	FW	Jim Hamilton	9 February 1976 (aged 20)		(Scotland) Dundee
10	FW	**Simon Donnelly**	1 December 1974 (aged 21)		(Scotland) Celtic
11	MF	**Allan Johnston**	14 December 1973 (aged 22)		(Scotland) Heart of Midlothian
12	GK	Colin Meldrum	26 November 1975 (aged 20)		(Scotland) Kilmarnock
13	DF	Stuart Gray	18 December 1973 (aged 22)		(Scotland) Celtic
14	DF	Martin Baker	8 June 1974 (aged 21)		(Scotland) St Mirren
15	DF	**Stephen Glass**	23 May 1976 (aged 19)		(Scotland) Aberdeen
16	MF	Neil Murray	21 February 1973 (aged 23)		(Scotland) Rangers
17	MF	Andy Liddell	28 June 1973 (aged 22)		(England) Barnsley
18	FW	Brian McLaughlin	14 May 1974 (aged 21)		(Scotland) Celtic

== Spain ==
Head coach: Javier Clemente

No.	Pos.	Player	Date of birth (age)	Caps	Club
1	GK	Juan Luis Mora	12 July 1973 (aged 22)		(Spain) Oviedo
2	MF	**Gaizka Mendieta**	27 March 1974 (aged 21)		(Spain) Valencia
3	DF	**Agustín Aranzábal**	15 March 1973 (aged 22)		(Spain) Real Sociedad
4	DF	**Javi Navarro**	6 February 1974 (aged 22)		(Spain) Valencia
5	DF	**Santi Denia**	9 March 1974 (aged 22)		(Spain) Atlético Madrid
6	MF	Óscar	26 April 1973 (aged 22)		(Spain) Barcelona
7	FW	**Raúl**	27 June 1977 (aged 18)		(Spain) Real Madrid
8	MF	Roberto Fresnedoso	15 January 1973 (aged 23)		(Spain) Atlético Madrid
9	DF	Sergio Corino	10 October 1974 (aged 21)		(Spain) Athletic Bilbao
10	MF	**José Ignacio**	28 September 1973 (aged 22)		(Spain) Valencia
11	MF	Iñigo Idiakez	8 November 1973 (aged 22)		(Spain) Real Sociedad
12	DF	**Aitor Karanka**	8 August 1973 (aged 22)		(Spain) Athletic Bilbao
13	GK	Jorge Aizkorreta	6 February 1974 (aged 22)		(Spain) Athletic Bilbao
14	FW	**Fernando Morientes**	5 April 1976 (aged 19)		(Spain) Zaragoza
15	MF	**Iván de la Peña**	6 May 1976 (aged 19)		(Spain) Barcelona
16	FW	**Jordi Lardín**	4 June 1973 (aged 22)		(Spain) Espanyol
17	DF	Sietes	18 February 1974 (aged 22)		(Spain) Valencia
18	FW	**Javier de Pedro**	4 August 1973 (aged 22)		(Spain) Real Sociedad
