= Ednei =

Ednei is a given name. It may refer to:

- Ednei (footballer, born 1985), Ednei Ferreira de Oliveira, Brazilian football right-back
- Ednei (footballer, born 1990), Ednei Barbosa de Souza, Brazilian football defender
