= 1990–91 RCD Mallorca season =

RCD Mallorca
1990–91 season
- President: Miquel Contestí
- Head coach: Lorenzo Serra Ferrer
- Stadium: Lluís Sitjar Stadium
- La Liga: 15th
- Copa del Rey: Runners-up
- Top goalscorer: League: Claudio Barragán (8); All: Claudio Barragán (12)

The 1990–91 season was the 75th season in the existence of RCD Mallorca and the club's second consecutive season in the top flight of Spanish football. In addition to the domestic league, Mallorca participated in this season's editions of the Copa del Rey.

== Competitions ==
=== Overall record ===
Competition	First match	Last match	Starting round	Final position	Record							
Competition	First match	Last match	Starting round	Final position	Pld	W	D	L	GF	GA	GD	Win %
La Liga	2 September 1990	8 June 1991	Matchday 1	15th	38	9	16	13	32	40	−8	23.68
Copa del Rey	13 December 1990	29 June 1991	Round of 64	Runners-up	11	7	1	3	19	8	+11	63.64
Total					49	16	17	16	51	48	+3	32.65

Source: BDFutbol

=== La Liga ===
==== League table ====
Pos	Team	Pld	W	D	L	GF	GA	GD	Pts	Qualification or relegation
13	Real Sociedad	38	11	14	13	39	45	−6	36	
14	Tenerife	38	14	7	17	37	53	−16	35	
15	Mallorca	38	9	16	13	32	40	−8	34	
16	Español	38	12	10	16	39	47	−8	34	
17	Zaragoza (O)	38	11	11	16	36	40	−4	33	Qualification for the relegation playoffs

Source: BDFútbol
Rules for classification: 1) Points; 2) Head-to-head results; 3) Goal difference; 4) Number of goals scored
(O) Play-off winners

==== Results summary ====
Overall								Home						Away					
Pld	W	D	L	GF	GA	GD	Pts	W	D	L	GF	GA	GD	W	D	L	GF	GA	GD
0	0	0	0	0	0	0	0	0	0	0	0	0	0	0	0	0	0	0	0

Source: BDFutbol

==== Results by round ====
Round	1	2	3	4	5	6	7	8	9	10	11	12	13	14	15	16	17	18	19	20	21	22	23	24	25	26	27	28	29	30	31	32	33	34	35	36	37	38
Ground	A	H	A	H	A	H	A	H	A	H	A	H	A	H	A	H	H	A	H	H	A	H	A	H	A	H	A	H	A	H	A	H	A	H	A	A	H	A
Result	W	D	L	W	L	W	L	L	L	D	D	W	L	D	L	D	W	L	W	W	L	D	L	L	D	D	L	D	L	D	W	D	W	D	D	D	D	D
Position	1	5	14	4	8	6	12	13	16	16	18	13	15	15	15	15	14	16	15	12	14	13	14	16	15	16	18	18	18	17	16	17	15	16	17	17	15	15

Source: BDFutbol
A = Away; H = Home; W = Win; D = Draw; L = Loss

==== Matches ====
2 September 1990 1	Logroñés	1–2	Mallorca	Logroño
CEST (UTC+2)

9 September 1990 2	Mallorca	1–1	Oviedo
CEST (UTC+2)

15 September 1990 3	Real Madrid	3–0	Mallorca	Madrid
CEST (UTC+2)

23 September 1990 4	Mallorca	4–0	Español
CEST (UTC+2)

29 September 1990 5	Valencia	1–0	Mallorca	Valencia
CEST (UTC+2)				Stadium: Estadio Luis Casanova

7 October 1990 6	Mallorca	1–0	Real Betis
CEST (UTC+2)

14 October 1990 7	Valladolid	5–1	Mallorca	Valladolid
CEST (UTC+2)

21 October 1990 8	Mallorca	0–1	Tenerife
CEST (UTC+2)

28 October 1990 9	Athletic Bilbao	2–0	Mallorca	Bilbao
CEST (UTC+2)

4 November 1990 10	Mallorca	1–1	Osasuna
CEST (UTC+2)

18 November 1990 11	Sporting Gijón	1–1	Mallorca	Gijón
CEST (UTC+2)

25 November 1990 12	Mallorca	1–0	Atlético Madrid
CEST (UTC+2)

2 December 1990 13	Barcelona	2–1	Mallorca	Barcelona
CEST (UTC+2)

9 December 1990 14	Mallorca	0–0	Castellón
CEST (UTC+2)

16 December 1990 15	Sevilla	1–0	Mallorca	Seville
CEST (UTC+2)

30 December 1990 16	Mallorca	0–0	Real Burgos
CEST (UTC+2)

6 January 1991 17	Mallorca	3–2	Zaragoza
CEST (UTC+2)

13 January 1991 18	Cádiz	1–0	Mallorca	Cádiz
CEST (UTC+2)

19 January 1991 19	Mallorca	2–1	Real Sociedad
CEST (UTC+2)

27 January 1991 20	Mallorca	2–0	Logroñés
CEST (UTC+2)

3 February 1991 21	Oviedo	1–0	Mallorca	Oviedo
CEST (UTC+2)

10 February 1991 22	Mallorca	1–1	Real Madrid
CEST (UTC+2)

24 February 1991 23	Español	3–0	Mallorca	Barcelona
CEST (UTC+2)

3 March 1991 24	Mallorca	0–1	Valencia
CEST (UTC+2)

10 March 1991 25	Real Betis	2–2	Mallorca	Seville
CEST (UTC+2)

17 March 1991 26	Mallorca	0–0	Valladolid
CEST (UTC+2)

24 March 1991 27	Tenerife	2–1	Mallorca	Santa Cruz de Tenerife
CEST (UTC+2)

31 March 1991 28	Mallorca	0–0	Athletic Bilbao
CEST (UTC+2)

7 April 1991 29	Osasuna	1–0	Mallorca	Pamplona
CEST (UTC+2)

14 April 1991 30	Mallorca	1–1	Sporting Gijón
CEST (UTC+2)

21 April 1991 31	Atlético Madrid	0–1	Mallorca	Madrid
CEST (UTC+2)

27 April 1991 32	Mallorca	1–1	Barcelona
CEST (UTC+2)

5 May 1991 33	Castellón	0–1	Mallorca	Castellón
CEST (UTC+2)

12 May 1991 34	Mallorca	1–1	Sevilla
CEST (UTC+2)

19 May 1991 35	Real Burgos	1–1	Mallorca	Burgos
CEST (UTC+2)

26 May 1991 36	Zaragoza	2–2	Mallorca	Zaragoza
CEST (UTC+2)

2 June 1991 37	Mallorca	0–0	Cádiz
CEST (UTC+2)

8 June 1991 38	Real Sociedad	0–0	Mallorca	San Sebastián
CEST (UTC+2)

=== Copa del Rey ===
==== Round of 64 ====
13 December 1990 First leg	Sabadell	0–3	Mallorca	Sabadell
CEST (UTC+2)				Stadium: Estadi de la Nova Creu Alta

19 December 1990 Second leg	Mallorca	4–1 (7–1 agg.)	Sabedell	Palma
CEST (UTC+2)				Stadium: Lluís Sitjar Stadium

==== Round of 32 ====
9 January 1991 First leg	Oviedo	1–1	Mallorca	Oviedo
CEST (UTC+2)				Stadium: Estadio Carlos Tartiere

23 January 1991 Second leg	Mallorca	2–0 (3–1 agg.)	Oviedo	Palma
CEST (UTC+2)				Stadium: Lluís Sitjar Stadium

==== Round of 16 ====
17 February 1991 First leg	Elche	2–1	Mallorca	Elche
CEST (UTC+2)				Stadium: Estadio Manuel Martínez Valero

27 February 1991 Second leg	Mallorca	3–1 (a.e.t.) (4–3 agg.)	Elche	Palma
CEST (UTC+2)				Stadium: Lluís Sitjar Stadium

==== Quarter-finals ====
12 June 1991 First leg	Valencia	1–0	Mallorca	Valencia
CEST (UTC+2)				Stadium: Estadio Luis Casanova

16 June 1991 Second leg	Mallorca	3–1 (3–2 agg.)	Valencia	Palma
CEST (UTC+2)				Stadium: Lluís Sitjar Stadium

==== Semi-finals ====
19 June 1991 First leg	Sporting Gijón	0–1	Mallorca	Gijón
CEST (UTC+2)				Stadium: El Molinón

23 June 1991 Second leg	Mallorca	1–0 (2–0 agg.)	Sporting Gijón	Palma
CEST (UTC+2)				Stadium: Lluís Sitjar Stadium

==== Final ====
29 June 1991 Final	Atlético Madrid	1–0 (a.e.t.)	Mallorca	Madrid
20:30 CEST (UTC+2)	Alfredo 111'			Stadium: Santiago Bernabéu Stadium; Attendance: 60,000; Referee: Joaquín Ramos Marco
