= RCD Mallorca =

Spanish professional football club

Mallorca
- Full name: Real Club Deportivo Mallorca, S.A.D.
- Nicknames: Los Piratas (The Pirates); Los Bermellones (The Vermilions); Els Barralets (The Barralet)
- Founded: 5 March 1916; 110 years ago as Alfonso XIII Foot-Ball Club
- Stadium: Estadi Mallorca Son Moix
- Capacity: 25,736
- Co-owner: Andy Kohlberg; Steve Nash; Steve Kerr
- President: Andy Kohlberg
- Head coach: Luis García
- League: Segunda División
- 2025–26: La Liga, 18th of 20 (relegated)
- Website: rcdmallorca.es
Home colours	Away colours	Third colours

Real Club Deportivo Mallorca, S.A.D. (Spanish: [reˈal ˈkluβ ðepoɾˈtiβo maˈʎoɾka], Catalan: Reial Club Deportiu Mallorca [rəˈjal ˈklub dəpuɾˈtiw məˈʎɔɾkə], Royal Sporting Club Mallorca), commonly known as Real Mallorca or RCD Mallorca, is a Spanish professional football club based in Palma on the island of Mallorca in the Balearic Islands. Founded on 5 March 1916, they currently compete in Segunda División, holding home games at the Estadi Mallorca Son Moix with a 25,736-seat capacity.

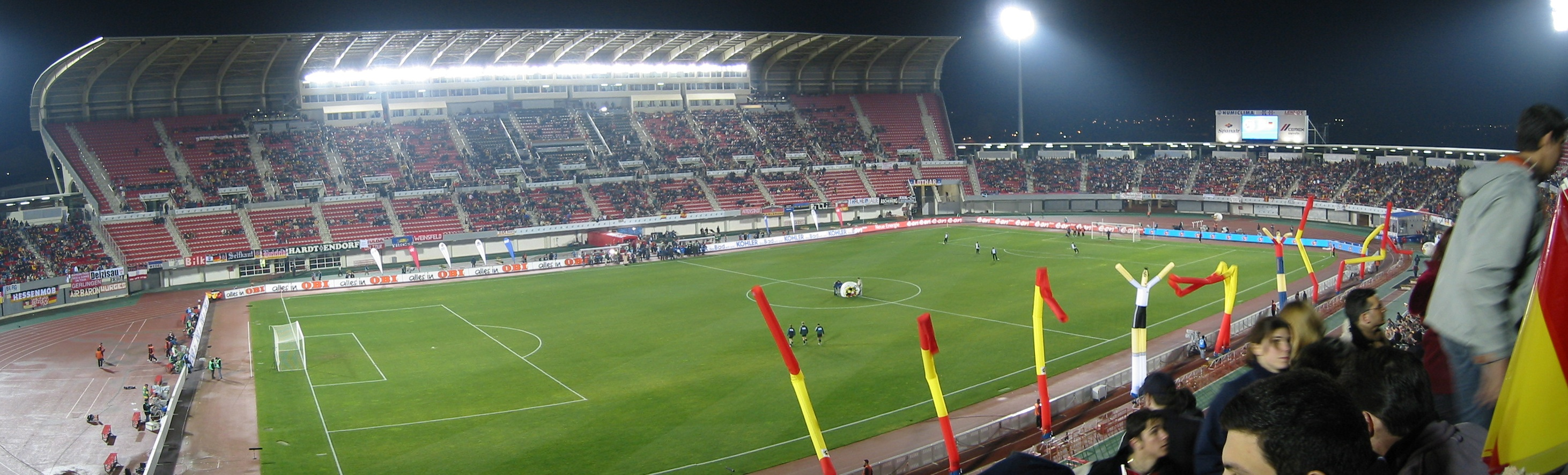
Panoramic of the Estadi Mallorca Son Moix Stadium.

The club had its peak in the late 1990s and early 2000s, reaching a best-ever third place in La Liga in 1999 and 2001 and winning the Copa del Rey in 2003 following final defeats in 1991, 1998 and 2024. Mallorca also won the 1998 Supercopa de España and reached the 1999 UEFA Cup Winners' Cup final.

Mallorca traditionally play in red shirts with black shorts and socks.

== History ==
=== The early years ===
Founded on 5 March 1916, what would later become RCD Mallorca was registered at the Spanish Football Federation under the name of Alfonso XIII Foot-Ball Club.

Weeks after its establishment, the club wasted little time forming the directors of Alfonso XIII FBC, headed by engineer Adolfo Vázquez Humasqué and eight other football fans.

Their first stadium, the Buenos Aires field, was inaugurated with a competitive fixture against FC Barcelona just 20 days after registering further fast-tracked development.

Despite the fixture ending in a disappointing 8–0 defeat, it was not long before King Alfonso XIII himself requested the royal adoption of ‘Real’ in the team's title, therefore becoming Real Sociedad Alfonso XIII Foot-Ball Club.

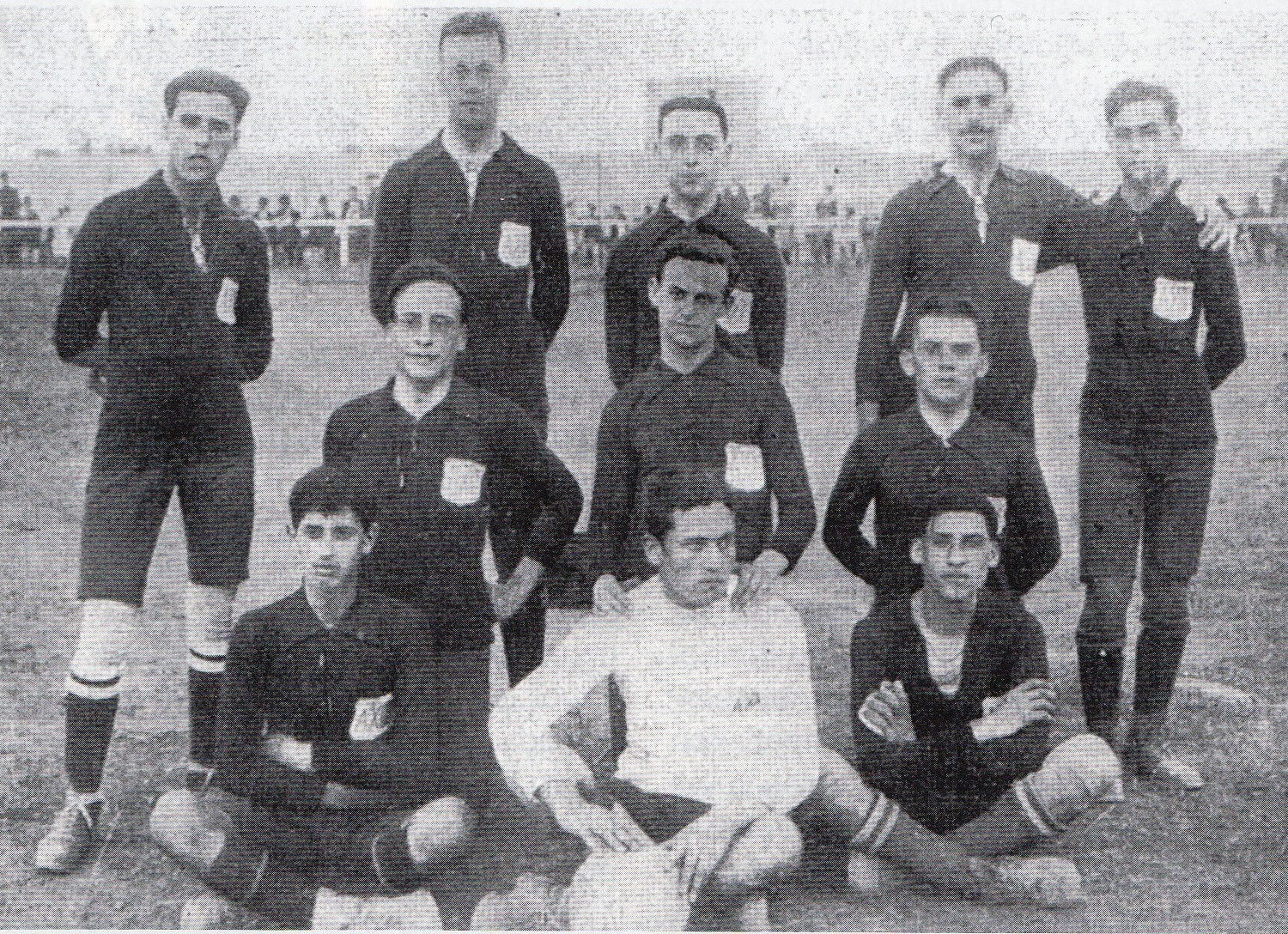
RCD Mallorca first match on 25 March 1916 against FC Barcelona reserve team.

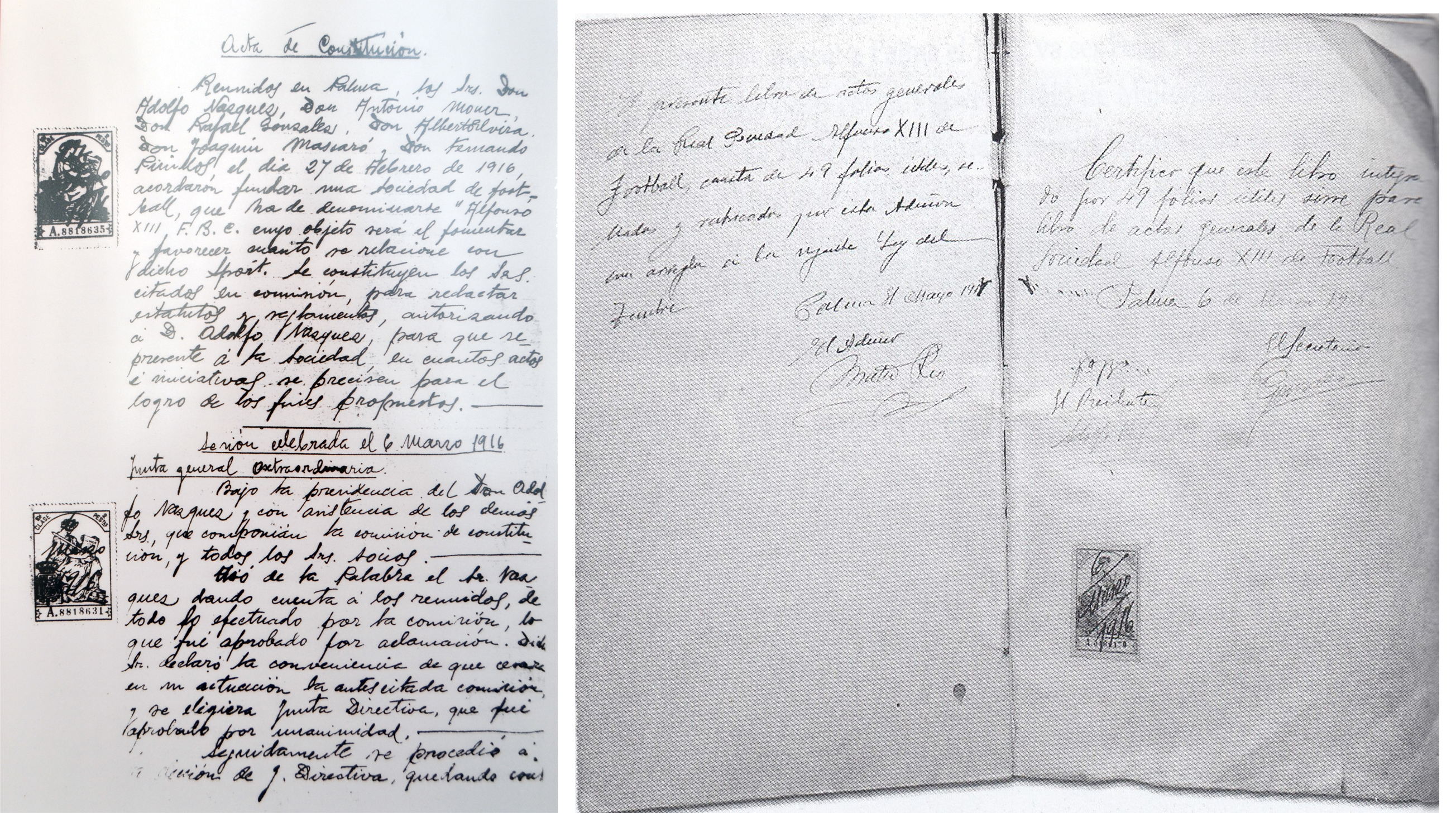
Founding charter of Alfonso XIII Football Club in 1916.

In 1917, the Catalan Federation granted Real Sociedad Alfonso XIII admission into the second-tier league championship as an unofficial champion of the Balearic Islands. Booking a place in the final, Los Bermellones went on to record their first title with a resounding 3–1 victory over Futbol Club Palafrugell, in Barcelona.

Until the 1930s, the board of directors managed to organise fixtures against peninsular clubs such as RCD Espanyol and Real Murcia, while also hosting rare exhibitions against foreign sides including: Ajax in 1923, Uruguay's national team in 1925, Chilean outfit Colo-Colo in 1927 and one of the Czech Republic's oldest teams, Prague Meteor, in 1930, the latter under coach Jack Greenwell, and with Antolín Arnau, Felipe Ferrer, and Pedro Pizá among its players.

In 1931, following the establishment of the Second Spanish Republic which prohibited any form of reference to monarchy, the club was renamed to Club Deportivo Mallorca.

Although major fixtures and competitions across Spain were soon interrupted by the outbreak of the Civil War in 1936, the squad enjoyed a highly successful spell by winning every possible championship they entered into, as football on the island remained resistant to the deferral experienced throughout the country.

When the war finally ended, matches with teams from the Peninsula were quick to resume and the Second Division was inaugurated, based on five groups of eight teams each.

It was during a period in the Second Division that, on 22 September 1945, the time had come to wave goodbye to Buenos Aires Field and up sticks to Es Fortí, a 16,000-maximum capacity stadium which would be called home for over half a century and undergo several expansions.

A line-up featuring forward Sebastián Pocoví, defender Saturnino Grech and goalkeeper Antoni Ramallets beat Jerez 3–0 on the opening game of the new campaign the following day, with Carlos Sanz scoring Es Fortí's first goal in front of packed-out terraces.

The title Es Fortí was short-lived however, with the board later changing the name of the stadium to Lluís Sitjar, in honour of the man who had driven the construction of the field.

During the 1949–1950 season, the Balearic club recovered their "Real" title, becoming Real Club Deportivo Mallorca

=== 1960–1990 ===
On 17 April 1960 Mallorca beat Levante 2-1 which confirmed promotion to La Liga for the first time in the clubs 44 year history.

In their first season in the Spanish First Division, the 1960/61 season, Mallorca finished 9th out of 16 teams, on 28 points just 2 points Oviedo in the relegation playoffs. They were knocked out of the Copa Del Rey in the round of 16 to Sevilla 4-3 across two legs.

Mallorca were then relegated back down to the Segunda Division after finishing 13th in the 1962/63 season, losing to Espanyol in the playoffs.

After finishing first in the 1964/65 Segunda Division season they were relegated again in the 1965/66 La Liga season after finishing a disappointing 15th, tied on points with Sabadell in 14th and Real Betis in 16th.

Mallorca would spend a few more seasons which saw them finish in the top 5 every season but were not promoted until the 1968/69 season which saw them finish 3rd, just 3 points off of first place Sevilla.

Despite this, Mallorca once again were relegated immediately, ending the 1969/70 La Liga season in 15th, only above Pontevedra who finished on just 13 points.

Mallorca would then sit in the lower half of the Segunda Division until the 1974/75 season which saw them finish a lowly 17th and ultimately being relegated to the Tercera División for the 1975/76 season, in which they finished 8th in their group.

Mallorca would then fall further down the Spanish football divisions being relegated to the 4th division for the 1978/79 season.

These tough times would not last however, as Mallorca would get back-to-back promotions, finishing first in the 1979/80 fourth division season and then again in the 1980/81 Tercera División.

Mallorca continued this streak of form with another promotion back to La Liga after finishing third in the 1982/83 Segunda Division.

These good times would end as Mallorca would end up relegated again after finishing the 1983/84 La Liga season in 17th on a mere 21 points.

Once again, Mallorca would come back after finishing the 1985/86 Segunda Division in 3rd, gaining promotion to La Liga for the 1986/87 season.

=== 1990s and 2000s: Peak ===
Chart of RCD Mallorca league performance 1929-present

In 1990–91, despite finishing the season 15th, Mallorca reached the Copa del Rey final for the first time, losing by one goal to Atlético Madrid.

Argentine Héctor Cúper was hired as manager in 1997. In his first season, the club reached the 1998 Copa del Rey Final, and lost on penalties to FC Barcelona after a 1–1 draw in Mestalla.

However, as Barcelona also won the league, Mallorca were their opponents in the 1998 Supercopa de España and won 3–1 on aggregate for their first major honour.

Barcelona's double also meant Mallorca entered the 1998–99 UEFA Cup Winners' Cup, the final staging of the tournament – they lost the final with a 2–1 score to Lazio at Villa Park.

In 1999, Mallorca also finished a best-ever 3rd and qualified for the first time to the UEFA Champions League, but were eliminated on the away goals rule by Molde FK of Norway before the group stage. Luis Aragonés matched 3rd place in 2001, before leaving for an Atlético Madrid still in the second tier.

Mallorca's 2001–02 season was turbulent, with the club going through three different coaches and finishing 16th in the table.

For the 2002–03 season, Gregorio Manzano was appointed as the club's manager. Mallorca finished ninth in the table with inconsistent form. That season Mallorca won their first Copa del Rey title; in their route to the final, they beat Real Madrid in the quarterfinals 4-0, and then eliminated defending champions Deportivo La Coruña.

In the final on 28 June 2003, Mallorca beat Recreativo de Huelva 3–0 in Elche with goals scored by Walter Pandiani and Samuel Eto'o. The Copa Del Rey title gave the club a berth in the UEFA Cup; they progressed through three rounds before being eliminated by Newcastle 7-1 on aggregate.

In the next few seasons the club comfortably finished mid-table; in the 2009–10 season the club had a great campaign and finished 5th while making the Copa del Rey quarter-finals. However, their Europa League spot was ceded to Villarreal due to Mallorca's economic difficulties.

=== 2010s: Decline and return ===
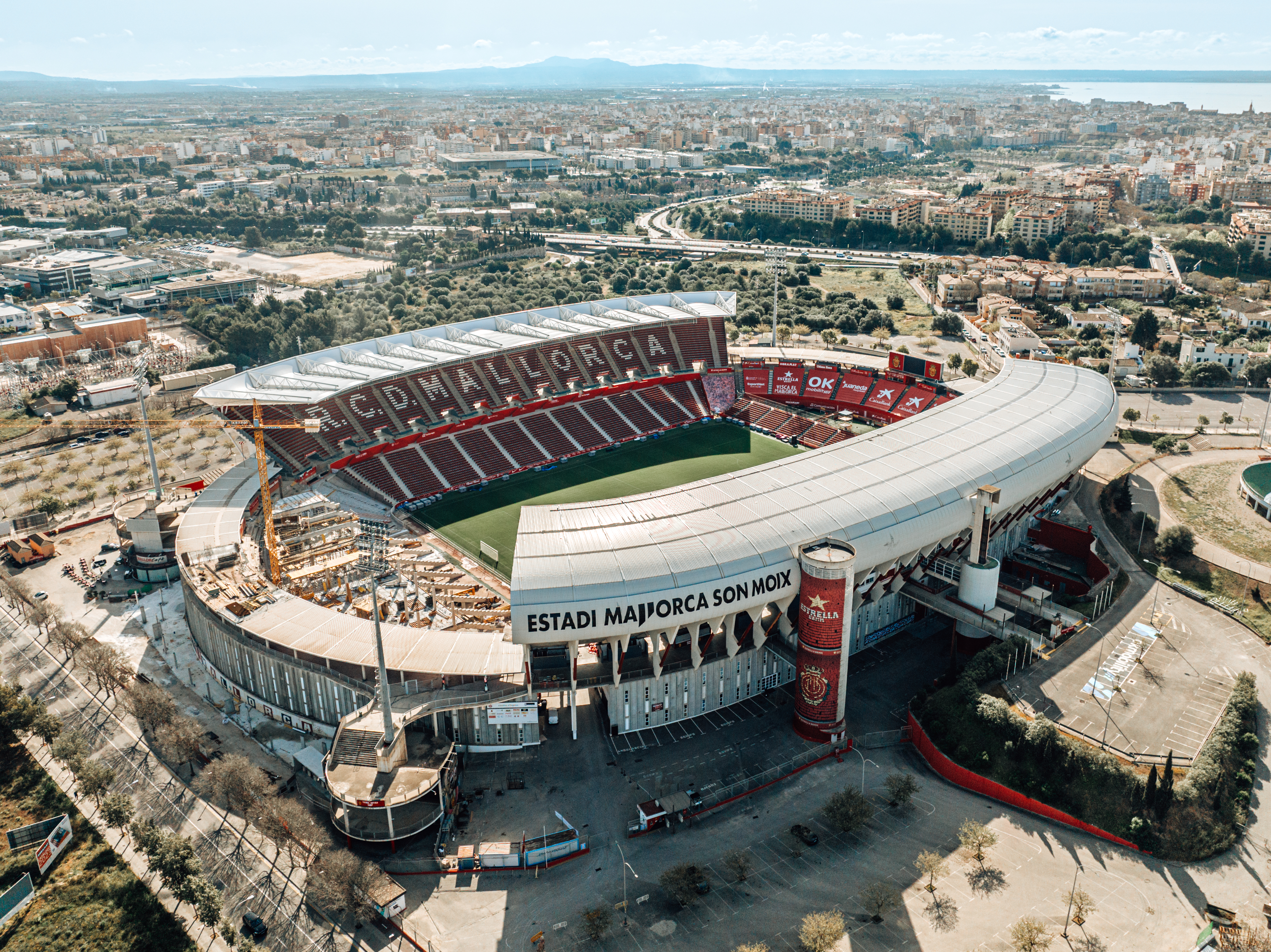
Estadi Mallorca Son Moix

Mallorca was relegated from La Liga on the last day of the 2012–13 season.

In January 2016, with the team at risk of relegation to the third tier, American investor Robert Sarver and former NBA player Steve Nash bought the club for just over €20 million.

On 4 June 2017, Mallorca fell into the third tier for the first time since 1981, with one game of the season still to play. A year later, they bounced back in the 2017–18 season after winning the group winners promotion play-off against Mirandés, under new manager Vicente Moreno.

In June 2019, Mallorca secured a second consecutive promotion to the 2019–20 La Liga, following a 3–2 win on aggregate over Deportivo de La Coruña in the 2019 Segunda División play-offs – having lost the first game 2–0. However, they were relegated a year later.

A year later, Mallorca bounced back to the top tier following an Almería defeat to Cartagena.

In 2024, Mallorca reached the Copa del Rey final for the first time since last winning the competition in 2003.

In May 2026, Mallorca were relegated to second division on the final match day of the 2025–26 season, after five seasons in the top tier.

== Season to season ==
Season	Tier	Division	Place	Copa del Rey
1931–32	3	3ª	4th	Round of 32
1932–33	4	Regional	2nd	Did not play
1933–34	4	Regional	4th	DNP
1934–35	4	Regional	3rd	DNP
1935–36	4	Regional	1st	Second round
1939–40	2	2ª	7th	DNP
1940–41	4	1ª Reg.	2nd	DNP
1941–42	4	1ª Reg.	1st	DNP
1942–43	4	1ª Reg.	1st	DNP
1943–44	3	3ª	1st	Round of 32
1944–45	2	2ª	11th	First round
1945–46	2	2ª	8th	First round
1946–47	2	2ª	5th	First round
1947–48	2	2ª	13th	Fifth round
1948–49	3	3ª	3rd	Fifth round
1949–50	2	2ª	11th	Round of 16
1950–51	2	2ª	12th	DNP
1951–52	2	2ª	6th	DNP
1952–53	2	2ª	8th	Second round
1953–54	2	2ª	16th	DNP

Season	Tier	Division	Place	Copa del Rey
1954–55	3	3ª	1st	DNP
1955–56	3	3ª	2nd	DNP
1956–57	3	3ª	1st	DNP
1957–58	3	3ª	1st	DNP
1958–59	3	3ª	1st	DNP
1959–60	2	2ª	1st	Quarter-finals
1960–61	1	1ª	9th	Round of 16
1961–62	1	1ª	11th	Round of 16
1962–63	1	1ª	13th	Round of 32
1963–64	2	2ª	3rd	Round of 32
1964–65	2	2ª	1st	Round of 16
1965–66	1	1ª	15th	Round of 16
1966–67	2	2ª	5th	Round of 32
1967–68	2	2ª	4th	First round
1968–69	2	2ª	3rd	DNP
1969–70	1	1ª	15th	Round of 32
1970–71	2	2ª	9th	Round of 32
1971–72	2	2ª	12th	Fourth round
1972–73	2	2ª	10th	Fourth round
1973–74	2	2ª	11th	Third round

Season	Tier	Division	Place	Copa del Rey
1974–75	2	2ª	17th	Round of 32
1975–76	3	3ª	9th	First round
1976–77	3	3ª	3rd	Second round
1977–78	3	2ª B	18th	First round
1978–79	4	3ª	13th	DNP
1979–80	4	3ª	1st	Third round
1980–81	3	2ª B	1st	Third round
1981–82	2	2ª	6th	Fourth round
1982–83	2	2ª	3rd	Fourth round
1983–84	1	1ª	17th	Third round
1984–85	2	2ª	7th	Round of 16
1985–86	2	2ª	3rd	Fourth round
1986–87	1	1ª	6th	Quarter-finals
1987–88	1	1ª	18th	Round of 32
1988–89	2	2ª	4th	Quarter-finals
1989–90	1	1ª	10th	First round
1990–91	1	1ª	15th	Runners-up
1991–92	1	1ª	20th	Fourth round
1992–93	2	2ª	4th	Round of 16
1993–94	2	2ª	5th	Third round

Season	Tier	Division	Place	Copa del Rey
1994–95	2	2ª	12th	Quarter-finals
1995–96	2	2ª	3rd	Second round
1996–97	2	2ª	3rd	Second round
1997–98	1	1ª	5th	Runners-up
1998–99	1	1ª	3rd	Quarter-finals
1999–2000	1	1ª	10th	Second round
2000–01	1	1ª	3rd	Quarter-finals
2001–02	1	1ª	16th	Round of 16
2002–03	1	1ª	9th	Winners
2003–04	1	1ª	11th	Round of 32
2004–05	1	1ª	17th	Round of 32
2005–06	1	1ª	13th	Third round
2006–07	1	1ª	12th	Round of 16
2007–08	1	1ª	7th	Quarter-finals
2008–09	1	1ª	9th	Semi-finals
2009–10	1	1ª	5th	Quarter-finals
2010–11	1	1ª	17th	Round of 16
2011–12	1	1ª	8th	Quarter-finals
2012–13	1	1ª	18th	Round of 16
2013–14	2	2ª	17th	Second round

Season	Tier	Division	Place	Copa del Rey
2014–15	2	2ª	16th	Second round
2015–16	2	2ª	17th	Second round
2016–17	2	2ª	20th	Third round
2017–18	3	2ª B	1st	Second round
2018–19	2	2ª	5th	Round of 32
2019–20	1	1ª	19th	Round of 32
2020–21	2	2ª	2nd	Second Round
2021–22	1	1ª	16th	Quarter-finals
2022–23	1	1ª	9th	Round of 16
2023–24	1	1ª	15th	Runners-up
2024–25	1	1ª	10th	Round of 32
2025–26	1	1ª	18th	Round of 32
2026–27	2	2ª		TBD

- 33 seasons in La Liga
- 38 seasons in Segunda División
- 3 seasons in Segunda División B
- 12 seasons in Tercera División
- 7 seasons in Divisiones Regionales

== Players ==
=== Current squad ===
As of 1 September 2026

Note: Flags indicate national team as defined under FIFA eligibility rules; some limited exceptions apply. Players may hold more than one non-FIFA nationality.

No.	Pos.	Nation	Player
1	GK	ESP	Arnau Tenas (on loan from Villarreal)
2	MF	ESP	Guille Fernández
3	DF	ESP	Toni Lato
4	DF	ESP	David López
5	DF	ESP	Alberto Moreno
6	MF	ESP	Antonio Sánchez
7	MF	ESP	Álex Sala (on loan from Lecce)
8	MF	ESP	Manu Morlanes
9	FW	ESP	Abdón Prats
10	MF	ESP	Sergi Darder
11	FW	ANG	Zito Luvumbo (on loan from Cagliari)
13	GK	FIN	Lucas Bergström
14	FW	COL	Daniel Luna
15	DF	ESP	John Chetauya (on loan from Elche)

No.	Pos.	Nation	Player
16	FW	POL	Adam Buksa (on loan from Udinese)
17	MF	ESP	Arnau Puigmal
18	FW	ESP	Adrián Fuentes
19	FW	ESP	Josep Cerdà
20	MF	ESP	Pablo Torre
21	DF	ESP	Antonio Raíllo (captain)
22	DF	FRA	Aboubaka Soumahoro (on loan from Hamburger SV)
23	FW	ESP	Antoniu Roca (on loan from Espanyol)
24	DF	SVK	Martin Valjent (vice-captain)
25	GK	ESP	Iván Cuéllar
28	MF	ESP	Jan Salas
30	FW	FRA	Justin Kalumba
33	FW	ESP	Adrián Liso (on loan from Zaragoza)

=== Reserve team ===
Note: Flags indicate national team as defined under FIFA eligibility rules; some limited exceptions apply. Players may hold more than one non-FIFA nationality.

No.	Pos.	Nation	Player
29	DF	ESP	Luis Orejuela
32	MF	GUI	Abdourahamane Diallo
34	DF	ESP	Miguel Calatayud
36	FW	ESP	Aimar Peña
37	GK	ESP	Toni Dols

No.	Pos.	Nation	Player
39	MF	ESP	Jandro García
40	MF	ESP	Alejandro Yerga
41	DF	GBS	Iago Mendes
42	DF	ESP	Oriol Tejada

=== Out on loan ===
Note: Flags indicate national team as defined under FIFA eligibility rules; some limited exceptions apply. Players may hold more than one non-FIFA nationality.

No.	Pos.	Nation	Player
—	DF	ESP	Javier Olaizola (at Eldense until 30 June 2027)
—	FW	ESP	Marc Domènech (at Atlético Madrileño until 30 June 2027)

== Management and staff ==
=== Technical staff ===
Position	Staff
Head coach	(Spain) Luis García
Assistant coach	(Spain) Mossa
Fitness coach	(Spain) Marc Giménez (Spain) Miguel Artigues
Goalkeeping coach	(Spain) Luisvi de Miguel
Analyst	(Spain) Jordi Benavent (Spain) Xim López
Team delegate	(Spain) Chando
Delegate	(Spain) Anabel Soto
Material team delegate	(Spain) Aitor Hernández (Spain) José Martín
Nutricionist	(Spain) Nuria Granados
Physiotherapist	(Spain) Magí Vicens (Spain) Julia Martínez (Spain) Dani Guiscafré (Spain) Ferran Rosselló
Readaptator	(Spain) Gabriel Tomás (Spain) Xavi Calvo

Last updated: 11 August 2026
Source: RCD Mallorca

=== Board of directors ===
Position	Staff
President	(United States) Andy Kohlberg
Board of directors	(United States) Sam Garvin
Board of directors	(United States) Glenn Carlson
Honorary secretary	(Spain) Rosemary Mafuz
Vice-secretary	(Spain) Alfonso Díaz

=== Sporting department ===
Position	Staff
Football CEO	(Spain) Pablo Ortells
Director of sports management	(Spain) Sergio Marty
Technical director	(Spain) Sergio Moya
Academy director	(Spain) Miquel Antoni Gelabert

=== Commercial department ===
Position	Staff
CEO of business	(Spain) Alfonso Díaz
Director of finance	(Spain) José Manuel Campos
Director of legality, compliance, operations and human resources	(Spain) Lidia Navarro
Ticketing	(Spain) Enrique García
Director of commercial	(Spain) Rubén Forcada
Director of communication and media	(Spain) Héctor Martín
Director of social area	(Spain) Román Albarrán
Director of marketing and strategic communications	(Spain) Vanessa Feo
Director of technology and innovation	(Spain) Roger Forns
Food & beverage (F&B)	(Spain) Gustavo Rueda
Director of RCD Mallorca studios	(Spain) Albert Salas
Events director	(Spain) Natalia Seoane
Training ground	(Spain) Rafael Navarro
Chief financial officer	(Spain) José Manuel Campos
Fundació Reial Mallorca	(Spain) Alberto Izquierdo

=== Presidents ===
Real Sociedad Alfonso XIII Football Club

- Adolfo Vázquez Humasqué (1916)
- Antoni Moner (1916–19)
- Josep Ramis d'Ayreflor (1919–24)
- Antoni Moner (1924–26)
- Lluís Sitjar (1926–27)
- Sebastià Sancho (1927)
- Manuel Villalonga (1927–29)
- Josep Ramis d'Ayreflor / Sebastià Sancho (1929–30)
- Antonio Parietti / Lluís Sitjar (1930–31)

Club Deportivo Mallorca

- Lluís Sitjar / Josep Sancho / Ramón Cavaller (1931–32)
- Miquel Seguí (1932–34)
- Llorenç Lladó / Andreu Homar (1934–35)
- Andreu Homar (1935–43)
- Lluís Sitjar (1943–46)
- Félix Pons Marqués (1946–47)

Real Club Deportivo Mallorca

- Joaquín Fuster / Andreu Homar / Joan de Vidal (1948–51)
- Antoni Buades / Josep Tous (1951)
- Antoni Buades / José María del Valle (1952)
- Llorenç Munar (1955)
- Jaume Rosselló (1956–61)
- Llorenç Munar (1961)
- Joan de Vidal (1964–66)
- Josep Barona (1966–67)
- Josep Barona / Pau Servera (1967–68)
- Pau Servera / Guillem Ginard (1969–70)
- Guillem Ginard / Josep Fandós (1970–71)
- Josep Fandós (1971–72)
- Joan de Vidal (1972–74)
- Joan de Vidal / Antoni Seguí (1974–75)
- Antonio Seguí / Joan Ferrer (1975–76)
- Guillem Ginard (1976-77)
- Guillem Ginard / Miquel Contestí (1977–78)
- Miquel Contestí (1978–92)
- Miquel Dalmau (1992–95)
- Bartomeu Beltrán (1995–98)
- Guillem Reynés (1998–00)
- Mateu Alemany (2000–05)
- Vicenç Grande (2005–08)
- Mateu Alemany (2008–09)
- Tomeu Vidal (2009–10)
- Josep Maria Pons (2010)
- Jaume Cladera (2010–12)

== Honours ==
=== Domestic competitions ===
- Copa del Rey
  - Winners (1): 2002–03
  - Runners-up (3): 1990–91, 1997–98, 2023–24
- Supercopa de España
  - Winners (1): 1998
  - Runners-up (1): 2003
- Segunda División
  - Winners (2): 1959–60, 1964–65
  - Play-off Winners (1): 2019
- Segunda División B
  - Winners (2): 1980–81, 2017–18

=== Continental competitions ===
- UEFA Cup Winners’ Cup
  - Runners-up (1): 1998–99

== League records ==
=== Team ===
- Best La Liga position: Third (1998–99, 2000–01)
- Record La Liga win: 7–1 v Recreativo de Huelva (h), 9 March 2008
- Record La Liga defeat: 7–0 v Atlético Madrid (a), 7 February 1988
- Fastest goal: 22 seconds - (Spain) Dani García v Real Oviedo, 21 February 1999.
- Most goals scored in a season: 69 (2007–08)

== Individual ==
=== Most appearances ===
As of 7 March 2026

#	Name	Matches
1°	(Spain) Paco Soler	419
2°	(Spain) Miguel Ángel Nadal	348
3°	(Spain) Javier Olaizola	333
4°	(Spain) Antonio Raíllo	312
5°	(Spain) Bernardo Sans	309
6°	(Spain) Dani Rodríguez	282
7°	(Spain) Doro	278
8°	(Spain) Ángel Pedraza	272
9°	(Spain) Abdón Prats	265
10°	(Portugal) José Nunes	258

=== Top scorers ===
As of 23 May 2026

#	Name	Goals
1°	(Spain) Joan Morro Albertí	94
2°	(Spain) Joan Forteza	87
3°	(Spain) Jofren	87
4°	(Spain) Sans	74
5°	(Serbia) Goran Milojević	71
6°	(Cameroon) Samuel Eto'o	70
7°	(Kosovo) Vedat Muriqi	58
8°	(Spain) Abdón Prats	57
9°	(Spain) Manolo	53
10°	(Spain) Ernesto Domínguez	53

- Pichichi Trophy
  - La Liga
    - (Spain) Daniel Güiza – 27 (2007–08)
- Ricardo Zamora Trophy
  - La Liga
    - (Argentina) Carlos Roa – 1998–99
  - Segunda División
    - (Morocco) Badou Zaki – 1988–89

=== World Cup players ===
The following players have been selected by their country in the World Cup Finals, while playing for Mallorca.

- (Socialist Federal Republic of Yugoslavia) Zoran Vulić (1990)
- (Spain) Iván Campo (1998)
- (Argentina) Carlos Roa (1998)
- (Spain) Albert Luque (2002)
- (Spain) Miguel Ángel Nadal (2002)
- (Cameroon) Samuel Eto'o (2002)
- (Cameroon) Pierre Webó (2010)
- (Algeria) Liassine Cadamuro-Bentaïba (2014)
- (South Korea) Lee Kang-in (2022)
- (Serbia) Predrag Rajković (2022)

== Club information ==
- Members: 12,107 (2020–21)
- Total Attendance in La Liga: 205,828 (2019–20) (Note: The attendance numbers are affected due to the COVID-19 pandemic)
- Average Attendance: 10,836 Spectators (2019–20)
- Official shirt manufacturer: Nike
- Official shirt sponsors: αGEL
- Other sponsors: Coca-Cola, CaixaBank, Estrella Damm, PayPal, Fibwi, juaneda, Air Europa, Specialized Bicycle Components, okmobility, Alua Hotels & Resorts

=== Stadium information ===
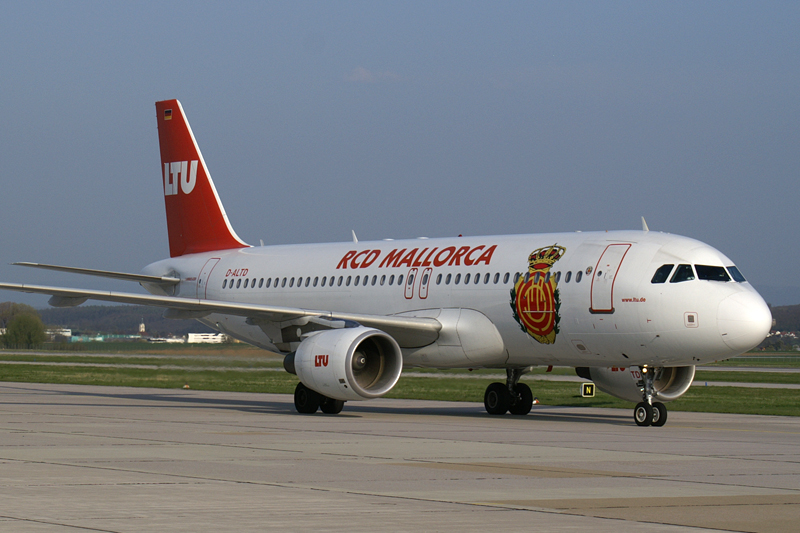
The team plane, needed due to the club's island location

- Name – Visit Mallorca Stadium
- City – Palma de Mallorca
- Capacity – 23,142
- Inauguration – June 1999
- Pitch size – 107 m x 69 m
- Other Facilities: – Antonio Asensio Sports Complex (aka "Son Bibiloni")
- Google Maps Location – Visit Mallorca Stadium

== Affiliated teams ==
- (Spain) RCD Mallorca B – Reserve team
