= Miguel Calatayud =

Spanish footballer

Personal information
- Full name: Miguel Calatayud García
- Date of birth: 26 April 2006 (age 20)
- Place of birth: Palma, Spain
- Position: Right-back

Team information
- Current team: Mallorca B
- Number: 2

Youth career
- 2015–2023: Mallorca
- 2023–2024: San Francisco
- 2024–2025: Mallorca

Senior career*
Years	Team	Apps	(Gls)
2025–	Mallorca B	37	(4)
2026–	Mallorca	12	(0)
- * Club domestic league appearances and goals as of 24 October 2026

Miguel Calatayud García (born 26 April 2006) is a Spanish professional footballer who plays as a right-back for RCD Mallorca B.

== Career ==
Born in Palma, Mallorca, Balearic Islands, Calatayud joined RCD Mallorca's youth categories in 2015, aged nine. He made his senior debut with the reserves on 6 April 2025, starting in a 1–0 Segunda Federación home loss to UE Olot.

On 12 March 2026, after establishing himself as a first-choice with the B-side, Calatayud renewed his contract with the Bermellones until 2030. He made his first team – and La Liga – debut on 10 May, coming on as a second-half substitute for Mateu Morey in a 1–1 home draw against Villarreal CF.

== Personal life ==
Calatayud's father Ramón was also a footballer. A midfielder, he never played in any higher than Tercera División, notably representing CD Atlético Baleares and CF Platges de Calvià.

== Career statistics ==
As of match played 24 October 2026

Appearances and goals by club, season and competition
Club	Season	League			Cup		Europe		Other		Total	
Club	Season	Division	Apps	Goals	Apps	Goals	Apps	Goals	Apps	Goals	Apps	Goals
Mallorca B	2024–25	Segunda Federación	5	0	—		—		—		5	0
Mallorca B	2025–26	Tercera Federación	32	4	—		—		—		32	4
Mallorca B	Total		37	4	—		—		—		37	4
Mallorca	2025–26	La Liga	2	0	—		—		—		2	0
Mallorca	2026–27	Segunda División	10	0	0	0	—		—		10	0
Mallorca	Total		12	0	0	0	—		—		12	0
Career total			49	4	0	0	0	0	0	0	49	4
