= Derek Coughlan =

Irish former footballer

Personal information
- Full name: Derek James Coughlan
- Position: Defender

Team information
- Current team: Cork City Women

Senior career*
Years	Team	Apps	(Gls)
1995–1996	Brighton & Hove Albion	1	(0)
1996–2002	Cork City	90	(11)
2002–2003	Bohemians	26	(4)
2003–2005	Cork City	31	(1)
Total		148	(16)

Managerial career
- 2025–2026: Cork City Women (under-17s manager)
- 2026–: Cork City Women
- * Club domestic league appearances and goals

Derek James Coughlan (born 2 January 1977) is an Irish former footballer who played as a defender. He is the manager of Cork City FC Women.

== Career ==
Coughlan played youth football in his native Cork for local teams Douglas Hall and Casement Celtic and also played minor Gaelic football for Cork GAA.

Coughlan joined his home town club Cork City in May 1996 from Brighton & Hove Albion, where he had made one Football League appearance. He scored his first goal for Cork on 28 December 1997 in a dramatic 4-4 draw against Shelbourne and entered Cork folklore by scoring the winning goal in the 1998 FAI Cup final replay at Dalymount Park.

This win gave Cork entry to the 1998–99 UEFA Cup Winners' Cup where Coughlan scored the winner against FC Arsenal Kyiv

In summer 2002, he joined Stephen Kenny's Bohemians, where he was dubbed 'The Brute' for his robust performances, and played a huge role in their title win that season. Midway through the 2003 season, he fell out of favour at the club and returned to Cork City when he earned another League winners medal in 2005.

Coughlan represented Ireland at Under-20 and Under-21 level.

== Coaching career ==
In January 2025, Coughlan was appointed manager of the newly former Under-17s side of Cork City Women.

In May 2026 he was appointed manager of Cork City Women's senior side

== Honours ==
- League of Ireland: 2
  - Bohemians - 2002/03
  - Cork City - 2005
- FAI Cup: 1
  - Cork City - 1998
- FAI League Cup: 1
  - Cork City - 1998/9
