= Felipe Ferrer =

Spanish footballer (1890 – 1986)

Personal information
- Full name: Felipe Ferrer Carreras
- Date of birth: 5 April 1910
- Place of birth: Palma de Mallorca, Spain
- Date of death: 1986 (aged 75-76)
- Place of death: Argentina
- Position: Forward

Senior career*
| Years | Team | Apps | (Gls) |
| 1928–1931 | Alfonso XIII | | |
| 1931–1933 | Mallorca | | |
| 1933–1935 | Levante | | |
| 1935–1936 | Real Oviedo | | |
| 1939–1940 | Valencia | | |
| 1940–1941 | Real Murcia | | |
| 1941–1942 | CD Málaga | | |
| 1942–1943 | Mallorca | | |
| 1943–1944 | Atlético Baleares | | |
- * Club domestic league appearances and goals

Felipe Ferrer Carreras (5 April 1910 – 1986) was a Spanish footballer who played as a forward for Mallorca, Levante, and Valencia.

== Playing career ==
Felipe Ferrer was born in Palma de Mallorca on 5 April 1910, but from the age of 8 to 16, he lived with his family in Argentina, so he trained as a footballer in the vacant lots of the city of Buenos Aires, popularly known as potreros. Upon his return to the Balearic Islands, he began playing as an inside left his the first player from Alfonso XIII, current RCD Mallorca, always appearing in the lineups of the late 1920s. He is the only player of Alfonso who went on to play in the First Division.

A player with great technique and a powerful shot, he became champion of Mallorca at only 18 years of age and played in a national championship within the Catalan Group. In the 1933–34 season, he signed with Levante, where he spent two seasons before going to play in Asturias with Real Oviedo, in the First Division, with whom he played five official matches and scored two goals. Oviedo, which finished third after Athletic Bilbao and Real Madrid, had a great team, with a forward line made up of Casuco, Gallart, Lángara, Herrerita and Emilín in which it was almost impossible to find a place, but Ferrer still managed to achieve it five times, but he lacked continuity and the arrival of the Spanish Civil War definitively cut his career short.

After the Civil War, he returned to the island to play for Mallorca, joining Valencia in 1939, where sometimes he was a part of the club's luxury forward line, which included Epi, Vicente Asensi, Mundo, and Gorostiza, but he did not enjoy real opportunities, since he only played one league game in two seasons. Valencia is the La Liga team that had the most players born in Mallorca throughout its history with six, with Ferrer being the first. He was then loaned to Murcia, but only for the Copa del Rey matches, and later signed with Málaga in the 1941–42 season. After it ended, the 30-year-old Ferrer returned home, playing one season with both Mallorca and Atlético Baleares before hanging up his boots in 1944, aged 34.

== Death ==
Ferrer died in Argentina in 1986, at the age of either 75 or 76.
