= Martin Ulrich Nielsen =

Danish footballer and manager (born 1973)

Martin Nielsen
Personal information
- Full name: Martin Ulrich Nielsen
- Date of birth: 24 July 1973 (age 53)
- Place of birth: Denmark
- Position: Midfielder

Youth career
- AIA/Tranbjerg

Senior career*
Years	Team	Apps	(Gls)
19??–1996	AGF Aarhus	?	(?)
1996–1998	F.C. Copenhagen	45	(1)
1998	→ Huddersfield Town (loan)	3	(0)
1999–2004	FC Midtjylland	85	(0)
2004–2007	Fremad Amager	41	(0)
2009–2011	BK Søllerød-Vedbæk	?	(?)

International career
1992–1994	Denmark u-21	9	(0)

Managerial career
- 2007–2009: Fremad Amager (assistant)
- 2009–2011: BK Søllerød-Vedbæk (assistant)
- 2011–2012: BGA (assistant)
- 2012–2013: BK Søllerød-Vedbæk (assistant)
- 2013: BK Søllerød-Vedbæk
- * Club domestic league appearances and goals as of 30 June 2011

Martin Ulrich Nielsen (born 24 July 1973) is a Danish footballer and manager, most recently in charge of BK Søllerød-Vedbæk in the Danish 2nd Division East. He has played nine games for the Danish under-21 national team.

He has previously played for F.C. Copenhagen, FC Midtjylland, AGF Aarhus, English side Huddersfield Town (on loan), Fremad Amager and BK Søllerød-Vedbæk. In December 1997 he had a trial at English club Sheffield Wednesday who were then in the Premier League, however this didn't lead to a transfer.
