= Martin Procházka (footballer) =

Czech footballer

Personal information
- Date of birth: 15 August 1969 (age 57)
- Position: Forward

Senior career*
Years	Team	Apps	(Gls)
1988–1991	Slavia Prague		
1991–?	Hradec Králové		
1995–2000	FK Jablonec		

International career
- Czechoslovakia U20
- * Club domestic league appearances and goals

Martin Procházka (born 15 August 1969) is a retired Czech football striker.

A youth international for Czechoslovakia, Procházka was a squad member at the 1989 FIFA World Youth Championship.
