= Felix Hakobyan =

Armenian footballer

Personal information
- Full name: Felix Hakobyan
- Date of birth: 11 March 1981 (age 45)
- Place of birth: Armenia
- Height: 1.95 m (6 ft 5 in)
- Position: Goalkeeper

Team information
- Current team: Mika Yerevan

Senior career*
Years	Team	Apps	(Gls)
2000	Dinamo-2000 Yerevan		
2001–2008	Mika Yerevan	68	(1)
2009	Damash Iranian F.C.		
2010	Impuls Dilijan		

International career^{‡}
2007	Armenia	1	(0)
- * Club domestic league appearances and goals as of June 2009 ‡ National team caps and goals as of 30 November 2009

Felix Hakobyan (Armenian: Ֆելիքս Հակոբյան, Russian: Феликс Валерьевич Акопян; born on 11 March 1981) is an Armenian footballer, currently with Armenian Premier League club Mika Yerevan. He has also been a member of the Armenia national team, has been capped 1 time since his debut in 2007.
