= Christos Germanos =

Cypriot footballer (born 1974)

Personal information
- Full name: Christos Germanos
- Date of birth: April 28, 1974 (age 52)
- Place of birth: Limassol, Cyprus
- Height: 1.78 m (5 ft 10 in)
- Position: Defender

Senior career*
Years	Team	Apps	(Gls)
1995–1997	Apollon Limassol	17	(0)
1997–1998	Evagoras	25	(1)
1998–2003	Apollon Limassol	90	(5)
2003–2004	APOEL	16	(0)
2004–2007	AEL Limassol	38	(1)
Total		186	(7)

International career^{‡}
2001–2004	Cyprus	9	(0)
- * Club domestic league appearances and goals as of 20 April 2008 ‡ National team caps and goals as of 20 April 2008

Christos Germanos (born April 28, 1974) is a former international Cypriot football defender.

He played in teams such as Evagoras, APOEL, AEL Limassol but his main career was in Apollon Limassol where he played seven years totally. After his retirement as a football player, he continued his journey in the fields as a professional coach. He made his first steps as an assistant coach in Karmiotissa Polemidia and later on, in Nea Salamina, followed by Apollon Limassol. He left Apollon to join Karmiotissa again and then he returned to Nea Salamina for a second time. When he left Nea Salamina, he joined PAEEK Keryneias. Right now he is the assistant coach of Cyprus national team U17 and U19.
