= Pedro López (footballer, born August 1983) =

Spanish footballer

Personal information
- Full name: Pedro Jesús López Pérez de Tudela
- Date of birth: 25 August 1983 (age 43)
- Place of birth: Cartagena, Spain
- Height: 1.84 m (6 ft 0 in)
- Position: Defender

Youth career
- El Algar
- Cartagonova
- 2001–2002: Real Madrid

Senior career*
Years	Team	Apps	(Gls)
2001	Cartagonova	9	(0)
2002–2004	Real Madrid C		
2002	Real Madrid B	1	(0)
2004–2005	Cartagena	15	(0)
2005–2008	Arezzo	22	(0)
2006–2007	→ Genoa (loan)	4	(0)
2008–2011	Mika	46	(0)
2011–2012	La Unión	29	(1)
2012–2013	Torrevieja	8	(0)
Total		134	(1)

International career
2001–2002	Spain U19	4	(0)
- * Club domestic league appearances and goals

Pedro Jesús López Pérez de Tudela (born 25 August 1983 in Cartagena, Region of Murcia) is a Spanish former footballer who played as a defender.
