= Tigran Hovhannisyan =

Armenian footballer

Personal information
- Date of birth: 5 December 1974 (age 51)
- Height: 1.75 m (5 ft 9 in)
- Position: Midfielder

Senior career*
Years	Team	Apps	(Gls)
1990–1992	Malatia	31	(6)
1993–2000	Tsement / Araks Ararat	154	(32)
1996	→ Homenmen Yerevan	6	(0)
2001–2002	Spartak Yerevan	37	(5)
2003	Lernagorts Kapan	9	(0)
2004	Mika Ashtarak	27	(0)
2005	Lernayin Artsakh	5	(0)
2006	Ararat Yerevan	15	(0)
2007	Gandzasar Kapan	10	(0)
2007–2008	Ulisses Yerevan	15	(1)

International career
1998–1999	Armenia	5	(0)
- * Club domestic league appearances and goals

Tigran Hovhannisyan (Armenian: Տիգրան Հովհաննիսյան; born 5 December 1974) is a retired Armenian football midfielder.
