= Pavel Jirousek =

Czech footballer and manager

Personal information
- Date of birth: 3 June 1973 (age 53)
- Place of birth: Czechoslovakia
- Position: Midfielder

Senior career*
Years	Team	Apps	(Gls)
1993–1995	Cheb		
1995–2002	Jablonec		
2002–2003	České Budějovice	23	(1)

International career
1994–1996	Czech Republic U21	9	(1)

Managerial career
- 2018–: Chrudim
- * Club domestic league appearances and goals

Pavel Jirousek (born 3 June 1973) is a retired Czech football midfielder and currently a manager. He made over 200 appearances in the Czech First League. Jirousek played international football at under-21 level for Czech Republic U21.

== Honours ==
=== Club ===
Jablonec

- Czech Cup: 1997–98
