= Karen Asatryan =

Armenian football player

Personal information
- Date of birth: 21 December 1974 (age 51)
- Height: 1.76 m (5 ft 9 1/2 in)
- Position: Midfielder

International career
Years	Team	Apps	(Gls)
1999–2000	Armenia	2	(0)

Karen Asatryan (born 21 December 1974) is an Armenian football player. He has played for Armenia national team.

== National team statistics ==
Armenia national team
Year	Apps	Goals
1999	1	0
2000	1	0
Total	2	0
