= Ednei (footballer, born 1985) =

Brazilian footballer

Personal information
- Full name: Ednei Ferreira de Oliveira
- Date of birth: 30 November 1985 (age 40)
- Place of birth: Brasília de Minas, Brazil
- Height: 1.80 m (5 ft 11 in)
- Position: Right-back

Youth career
- 2005: América Mineiro
- 2006: → Itumbiara (loan)

Senior career*
Years	Team	Apps	(Gls)
2007–2008	América Mineiro		
2008–2009	Trindade		
2009–2012	FC Mika	66	(19)
2013	Veranópolis	18	(1)
2013–2014	Internacional	11	(0)
2014	→ Chapecoense (loan)	28	(1)
2015	XV de Piracicaba	9	(0)
2015	ABC	20	(2)
2016	Atlético Goianiense	16	(2)
2016	Goiás	8	(1)
2017–2018	Brasil de Pelotas	16	(1)
2019	Novo Hamburgo	8	(0)
2019–2020	Brasil de Pelotas	32	(1)
2020	Ferroviária	0	(0)
2021	Caucaia	10	(3)
- * Club domestic league appearances and goals as of 19:12, 31 May 2022 (UTC)

Ednei Ferreira de Oliveira, commonly known as Ednei is a Brazilian footballer who plays as a right-back.

== Career ==
Ednei spent three seasons with Armenian Premier League side FC Mika early in his career.

He has represented Internacional in 2013 and Chapecoense in 2014 at the top level of Brazilian football, Campeonato Brasileiro Série A. Subsequently, he represented ABC, Atlético Goianiense and Goiás in Campeonato Brasileiro Série B in the 2015 and 2016 seasons.

Ednei arrived at Brasil de Pelotas in July 2017 and, after a spell with Novo Hamburgo for the first part of 2019, rejoined in April.
