= Milan Barteska =

Czech football midfielder

Personal information
- Date of birth: 17 June 1973 (age 53)
- Place of birth: Czechoslovakia
- Height: 1.79 m (5 ft 10 in)
- Position: Midfielder

Senior career*
Years	Team	Apps	(Gls)
1994–1997	Dynamo České Budějovice		
1998–2001	FK Jablonec	39	(4)
2002–2004	FC Viktoria Plzeň	27	(5)
2004–2005	1. FK Příbram	16	(2)
2005	FK Viktoria Žižkov		
2005–2006	FC Viktoria Plzeň	27	(2)
2006–2009	SFC Opava		
2009–2010	FK Sezimovo Ústí		

International career
1995–1996	Czech Republic U21	9	(1)
- * Club domestic league appearances and goals

Milan Barteska (born 17 June 1973) is a Czech football midfielder. He made over 250 appearances in the Czech First League. He also played international football at under-21 level for Czech Republic U21, scoring once in nine appearances.

Barteska announced his retirement from football in January 2011, having played 270 matches at the top level in the Czech Republic.
