= 1995–96 Real Zaragoza season =

Real Zaragoza S.A.D.
1995–96 season
- Owner: Solans Family (64%)
- President: Alfonso Solans
- Head coach: Víctor Fernández
- Stadium: La Romareda
- La Liga: 13th
- Copa del Rey: Quarter-finals
- UEFA Cup Winners' Cup: Quarter-finals
- UEFA Super Cup: Runners-up
- Top goalscorer: League: Fernando Morientes (13 goals); All: Morientes (18 goals)
Home colours	Away colours

The 1995–96 season was the 61st season in existence for Real Zaragoza. The club competed in La Liga for 18th consecutive year, Copa del Rey and UEFA Cup Winners' Cup.

== Summary ==
During summer Alfonso Solans in his 4th season as President, reinforced the squad with several players such as young forwards Fernando Morientes and Dani García whom arrived from Albacete Balompié and Real Madrid respectively the latter on loan. On the contrary striker Juan Eduardo Esnaider, Brazilian right-back Defender Cafu and Defensive midfielder Dario Franco left the club, another transfer in was midfielder Sergio Berti from River Plate and defender Paqui from Tenerife. Meanwhile in his 5th season as head coah Victor Fernández did not repeat the same good performances of past seasons, along the sale of Esnaider came the ageing of Pardeza and Higuera on the offensive line prompting a transition phase with Morientes and Dani.

The team collapsed in league to mid table spots during the entire campaign even with the arrivals of Gustavo Adrián López (the most expensive club transfer ever) and Sebastian Rambert on winter. Also in Copa del Rey the team was early eliminated by underdogs Espanyol in quarterfinals. In UEFA Cup Winners' Cup the incumbent champions reached the quarterfinals stage losing the series against Deportivo La Coruña. Finally, in 1995 UEFA Super Cup the team was defeated by AFC Ajax including a 0-4 result.

The season high mark for the squad were the decent performance of 20-yr-old striker Fernando Morientes scoring 18 goals during the season.

== Squad ==
Note: Flags indicate national team as defined under FIFA eligibility rules; some limited exceptions apply. Players may hold more than one non-FIFA nationality.

No.	Pos.	Nation	Player
1	GK	ESP	Andoni Cedrún
2	DF	ESP	Alberto Belsué
3	DF	ESP	Jesús Solana
4	DF	ARG	Fernando Caceres
5	MF	ESP	Jesús García Sanjuan
6	DF	ESP	Xavier Aguado
7	FW	ESP	Miguel Pardeza
8	MF	ESP	Santiago Aragon
9	FW	ESP	Fernando Morientes
10	FW	ESP	Francisco Higuera
11	MF	URU	Gustavo Poyet

No.	Pos.	Nation	Player
12	DF	ESP	Luis Cuartero
13	GK	ESP	José Belman
14	MF	ESP	Nayim
15	MF	ESP	Oscar
16	MF	ESP	Jose Aurelio Gay
17	DF	ESP	Paqui
18	MF	ARG	Sergio Berti
19	FW	ARG	Gustavo Adrián López
20	FW	ESP	Daniel García Lara
21	FW	ARG	Sebastián Rambert
22	GK	ESP	Juanmi
23	MF	ESP	Iñigo

=== Transfers ===
In
Pos.	Name	from	Type
FW	Fernando Morientes	Albacete Balompié	U$2,911 million
FW	Daniel García Lara	Real Madrid	on loan
MF	Sergio Berti	CA River Plate	
DF	Paqui	CD Tenerife	

Out
Pos.	Name	To	Type
FW	Juan Esnaider	Real Madrid	
DF	Cafu	Juventude	
DF	Geli	Celta de Vigo	
MF	Dario Franco	Atlas FC	
DF	José Luis Loreto	Logroñes CF	loan
DF	Lizarralde	Lleida Esportiu	
DF	Sergi	Gavá	

==== Winter ====
In
Pos.	Name	from	Type
FW	Sebastian Rambert	Internazionale	on loan
FW	Gustavo Lopez	CA Independiente	

Out
Pos.	Name	To	Type
DF	Fernando Caceres	Boca Juniors	on loan

== Competitions ==
=== La Liga ===
==== League table ====
Pos	Team	Pld	W	D	L	GF	GA	GD	Pts
11	Celta Vigo	42	12	16	14	49	51	−2	52
12	Sevilla	42	11	15	16	43	55	−12	48 (Note: SEV: 10 pts;ZAR: 8 pts; ROV: 6 pts → ROV 0–0 ATH; ATH: 6 pts → ATH 0–1 ROV)
13	Zaragoza	42	11	15	16	51	59	−8	48
14	Oviedo	42	12	12	18	48	67	−19	48
15	Athletic Bilbao	42	11	15	16	44	55	−11	48

Source: LFP
Rules for classification: 1) points; 2) head-to-head points; 3) head-to-head goal difference; 4) head-to-head goals scored; 5) goal difference; 6) number of goals scored.

==== Position by round ====
Round	1	2	3	4	5	6	7	8	9	10	11	12	13	14	15	16	17	18	19	20	21	22	23	24	25	26	27	28	29	30	31	32	33	34	35	36	37	38	39	40	41	42
Ground	H	A	H	A	H	A	H	A	H	A	H	A	H	A	H	A	H	A	A	H	A	A	H	A	H	A	H	A	H	A	H	A	H	A	H	A	H	A	A	H	A	H
Result	W	L	L	D	W	W	L	W	L	D	W	W	W	D	D	W	W	D	L	D	D	D	L	L	W	L	D	W	W	L	L	D	D	D	D	D	L	D	W	W	L	L
Position	8	13	17	16	10	9	12	8	11	10	13	15	17	17	16	13	11	11	12	12	13	14	14	14	12	13	13	12	11	11	13	13	14	14	15	14	16	17	13	12	12	13

Source: https://www.bdfutbol.com/en/t/t1992-9339.html?tab=partits
A = Away; H = Home; W = Win; D = Draw; L = Loss; = Leader, 1996–97 UEFA Champions League Group stage; = 1996–97 UEFA Cup First round; = 1996–97 Relegation playoff to 1996–97 Segunda Division; = 1996–97 Segunda Division; R = 1996–97 UEFA Cup Winners' Cup

==== Matches ====
3 September 1995 1	Real Zaragoza	1–0	Real Oviedo	Zaragoza
	Aguado 14'; (yellow card) Belsue; (yellow card) 84' (yellow-red card) Caceres; (yellow card) Paqui	Report	(yellow card) Armando; (yellow card) Andres; (yellow card) Sanz; (yellow card) Dubovsky; (yellow card) Carlos	Stadium: La Romareda; Referee: Nuñez Marquez

9 September 1995 2	Real Betis	3–1	Real Zaragoza	Seville
	1-0 Alfonso 17' 2-0 Pier 21' 3-1 Alfonso 57'	Report	2-1 Morientes 48' (yellow card) 55' (yellow-red card)	Stadium: Benito Villamarin; Referee: Ansuategui Roca

17 September 1995 3	Real Zaragoza	0–3	FC Barcelona	Zaragoza
	Prosinecki 8'	Report	0-1 Jordi Cruyff 51' 0-2 Kodro 70' 0-3 Figo 73'	Stadium: La Romareda; Referee: Fernández Marín

24 September 1995 4	Valencia CF	0–0	Real Zaragoza	Valencia
		Report		Stadium: Mestalla

1 October 1995 5	Real Zaragoza	1–0	Compostela	Zaragoza
		Report		Stadium: La Romareda

4 October 1995 6	Salamanca	0–1	Real Zaragoza	Villares de la Reina
		Report		Stadium: Helmántico Stadium

8 October 1995 7	Real Zaragoza	0–2	CD Tenerife	Zaragoza
		Report		Stadium: La Romareda

15 October 1995 8	Albacete Balompié	0–1	Real Zaragoza	Albacete
		Report

22 October 1995 9	Real Zaragoza	1–2	Real Sociedad	Zaragoza
		Report		Stadium: La Romareda

29 October 1995 10	Racing Santander	0–0	Real Zaragoza	Santander
		Report		Stadium: El Sardinero

18 November 1995 11	Real Zaragoza	0–1	Atlético Madrid	Zaragoza
		Report		Stadium: La Romareda

12 November 1995 12	Sporting de Gijón	4–1	Real Zaragoza	Gijón
		Report		Stadium: El Molinon

18 November 1995 13	Real Zaragoza	0–1	Sevilla CF	Zaragoza
		Report		Stadium: La Romareda

26 November 1995 14	RCD Espanyol	1–1	Real Zaragoza	Barcelona
		Report

3 December 1995 15	Real Zaragoza	0–0	Celta de Vigo	Zaragoza
		Report		Stadium: La Romareda

10 December 1995 16	Deportivo La Coruña	2–3	Real Zaragoza	A Coruña
		Report		Stadium: Riazor

17 December 1995 17	Real Zaragoza	5–3	Real Valladolid	Zaragoza
		Report		Stadium: La Romareda

20 December 1995 18	Mérida AD	1–1	Real Zaragoza	Mérida
		Report

3 January 1996 19	Athletic Bilbao	1–0	Real Zaragoza	Bilbao
		Report		Stadium: San Mamés

7 January 1996 20	Real Zaragoza	1–1	Rayo Vallecano	Zaragoza
		Report		Stadium: La Romareda

14 January 1996 21	Real Madrid	2–2	Real Zaragoza	Madrid
		Report		Stadium: Santiago Bernabeu

21 January 1996 22	Real Oviedo	1–1	Real Zaragoza	Oviedo
		Report		Stadium: Carlos Tartiere

24 January 1996 23	Real Zaragoza	1–2	Real Betis	Zaragoza
		Report		Stadium: La Romareda

28 January 1996 24	FC Barcelona	3–1	Real Zaragoza	Barcelona
		Report		Stadium: Camp Nou

3 February 1996 25	Real Zaragoza	4–1	Valencia CF	Zaragoza
		Report		Stadium: La Romareda

11 February 1996 26	Compostela	3–2	Real Zaragoza	Santiago de Compostela
		Report

17 February 1996 27	Real Zaragoza	1–1	Salamanca	Zaragoza
		Report		Stadium: La Romareda

25 February 1996 28	CD Tenerife	1–2	Real Zaragoza	Santa Cruz de Tenerife
		Report

3 March 1996 29	Real Zaragoza	3–1	Albacete Balompié	Zaragoza
		Report		Stadium: La Romareda

10 March 1996 30	Real Sociedad	3–1	Real Zaragoza	San Sebastián
		Report		Stadium: Anoeta

17 March 1996 31	Real Zaragoza	1–2	Racing Santander	Zaragoza
		Report		Stadium: La Romareda

24 March 1996 32	Atlético Madrid	1–1	Real Zaragoza	Madrid
		Report		Stadium: Vicente Calderon

27 March 1996 33	Real Zaragoza	1–1	Sporting de Gijón	Zaragoza
		Report		Stadium: La Romareda

31 March 1996 34	Sevilla CF	1–1	Real Zaragoza	Seville
		Report		Stadium: Sanchez Pizjuan

6 April 1996 35	Real Zaragoza	1–1	RCD Espanyol	Zaragoza
		Report		Stadium: La Romareda

14 April 1996 36	Celta de Vigo	1–1	Real Zaragoza	Vigo
		Report		Stadium: Balaidos

21 April 1996 37	Real Zaragoza	2–3	Deportivo La Coruña	Zaragoza
		Report		Stadium: La Romareda

28 April 1996 38	Real Valladolid	0–0	Real Zaragoza	Valladolid
		Report		Stadium: Jose Zorrilla

5 May 1996 39	Real Zaragoza	3–1	Mérida AD	Mérida
		Report

12 May 1996 40	Real Zaragoza	1–0	Athletic Bilbao	Zaragoza
		Report		Stadium: La Romareda

19 May 1996 41	Rayo Vallecano	4–3	Real Zaragoza	Madrid
		Report		Stadium: Vallecas

25 May 1996 42	Real Zaragoza	0–1	Real Madrid	Zaragoza
		Report		Stadium: La Romareda

=== Copa del Rey ===
==== Third round ====
bye as 1995-96 UEFA Cup Winners' Cup qualified team.

==== Fourth round ====
bye as 1995-96 UEFA Cup Winners' Cup qualified team.

==== Fifth round ====
bye as 1995-96 UEFA Cup Winners' Cup qualified team.

==== Eightfinals ====
10 January 1996	Athletic Bilbao	2–3	Zaragoza	Bilbao
20:15 CET	Guerrero 43'; Etxeberria 51'	Report (in Spanish)	Morientes 8', 28', 52'	Stadium: San Mamés; Attendance: 30,000; Referee: Rubio Valdivieso (Castile and León)

17 January 1996	Zaragoza	0–1	Athletic Bilbao	Zaragoza
20:30 CET		Report (in Spanish)	Etxeberria 83'	Stadium: La Romareda; Attendance: 18,000; Referee: Ansuátegui Roca (Valencian Community)

==== Quarter-finals ====
31 January 1996	Espanyol	0–0	Zaragoza	Barcelona
21:00 CET		Report (in Spanish)		Stadium: Sarrià; Attendance: 18,000; Referee: Esquinas Torres (Community of Madrid)

14 February 1996	Real Zaragoza	1–1	Espanyol	Zaragoza
20:00 CET	López 19'	Report (in Spanish)	Pacheta 7'	Stadium: La Romareda; Attendance: 15,000; Referee: Marín López (La Rioja)

=== UEFA Supercup ===
6 February 1996	Real Zaragoza (Spain)	1–1	(Netherlands) Ajax	La Romareda, Zaragoza
20:30 CET	Aguado 28'	Report	Kluivert 70'	Attendance: 23,000; Referee: Rémi Harrel (France)

28 February 1996	Ajax (Netherlands)	4–0	(Spain) Real Zaragoza	Olympic Stadium, Amsterdam
18:30 CET	Bogarde 43'; George 54'; Blind 65' (pen.), 69' (pen.)	Report		Attendance: 22,000; Referee: Leslie Mottram (Scotland)

=== UEFA Cup Winners' Cup ===
==== Quarterfinals ====
7 March 1996	Deportivo La Coruña (Spain)	1–0	(Spain) Real Zaragoza	A Coruña
21:30	Fernández 70'	Report		Stadium: Riazor; Attendance: 13,800; Referee: Gerd Grabher (Austria)

21 March 1996	Real Zaragoza (Spain)	1–1	(Spain) Deportivo La Coruña	La Romareda, Zaragoza
21:30	Morientes 37'	Report	Bebeto 64'	Attendance: 31,900; Referee: Guy Goethals (Belgium)

== Statistics ==
=== Players statistics ===
No.	Pos	Nat	Player	Total		La Liga		Copa del Rey		UEFA	
No.	Pos	Nat	Player	Apps	Goals	Apps	Goals	Apps	Goals	Apps	Goals
22	GK	(Spain) ESP	Juanmi	38	-46	31	-43	3	-3	4	0
2	DF	(Spain) ESP	Belsue	47	0	37	0	4	0	6	0
4	DF	(Argentina) ARG	Caceres	39	2	30	2	4	0	5	0
6	DF	(Spain) ESP	Aguado	44	2	36	2	4	0	4	0
3	DF	(Spain) ESP	Solana	30	0	26+1	0	3	0		
11	MF	(Uruguay) URU	Poyet	46	12	34+2	11	4	0	6	1
15	MF	(Spain) ESP	Oscar	40	2	26+6	1	3	0	3+2	1
14	MF	(Spain) ESP	Nayim	41	2	22+10	2	2+2	0	5	0
8	MF	(Spain) ESP	Aragon	46	5	37+1	4	3	0	4+1	1
20	FW	(Spain) ESP	Dani García	47	6	26+12	3	3	0	4+2	3
9	FW	(Spain) ESP	Morientes	37	18	28+1	13	3	3	5	2
13	GK	(Spain) ESP	Belman	14	-17	11	-16	1	-1	2	0
17	DF	(Spain) ESP	Paqui	32	0	20+6	0	1+2	0	2+1	0
21	FW	(Argentina) ARG	Rambert	24	5	17+3	5	3+1	0		
10	FW	(Spain) ESP	Higuera	37	3	16+13	2	2+1	0	5	1
5	MF	(Spain) ESP	Garcia Sanjuan	33	0	16+11	0	0+2	0	2+2	0
7	FW	(Spain) ESP	Pardeza	31	2	15+11	2	0	0	1+4	0
12	DF	(Spain) ESP	Cuartero	20	0	13+5	0	0	0	2	0
18	MF	(Argentina) ARG	Berti	20	0	12+4	0	0	0	3+1	0
19	FW	(Argentina) ARG	Gustavo Lopez	23	3	9+9	2	1+3	1	0+1	0
16	MF	(Spain) ESP	Gay	16	0	0+14	0	0	0	0+2	0
23	MF	(Spain) ESP	Iñigo	1	0	0+1	0				
1	GK	(Spain) ESP	Cedrún								

- Source: BDFutbol

== See also ==
- BDFutbol
