= 1994–95 Real Zaragoza season =

Real Zaragoza S.A.D.
1994–95 season
- Owner: Solans Family (64%)
- President: Alfonso Solans
- Head coach: Víctor Fernández
- Stadium: La Romareda
- La Liga: 7th
- Copa del Rey: Round of 16
- UEFA Cup Winners' Cup: Winners (in 1995–96 UEFA Cup Winners' Cup)
- Top goalscorer: League: Juan Esnaider (16 goals); All: Esnaider (25 goals)
Home colours	Away colours	Third colours

The 1994–95 season was the 60th season in existence for Real Zaragoza competed in La Liga for 17th consecutive year, Copa del Rey and UEFA Cup Winners' Cup for the first time since the 1986–87 edition.

== Summary ==
During Summer the club kept its core line-up delivering a decent performance in League with the team competing over European spots including a massive record of 18 months undefeated at La Romareda. During winter Presidente Solans reinforced the team with Brazilian Right-back Cafu a 1994 FIFA World Cup winner. In Copa del Rey as incumbent Champions the squad was early eliminated by underdogs Albacete Balompie in Eightfinals. However, the season is best remembered by the club participation in UEFA Cup Winners' Cup, after defeated Feyenoord in Quarterfinals, the team eliminated Chelsea F.C. in semifinals and reaching the 1995 UEFA Cup Winners' Cup Final for the first time ever.

Finally, the club won in Paris its first European trophy defeating incumbent Champions and heavy-favourites Arsenal F.C. with a last minute goal scored by former Tottenham Hotspur midfielder Nayim at Parc des Princes.

== Squad ==
Note: Flags indicate national team as defined under FIFA eligibility rules; some limited exceptions apply. Players may hold more than one non-FIFA nationality.

No.	Pos.	Nation	Player
—	GK	ESP	Andoni Cedrún
—	GK	ESP	Juanmi
—	GK	ESP	José Belman
—	DF	BRA	Cafu
—	DF	ESP	Alberto Belsué
—	DF	ESP	Jesús Solana
—	DF	ESP	Xavier Aguado
—	DF	ARG	Fernando Caceres
—	DF	ESP	Luis Cuartero
—	DF	ESP	Lizarralde
—	DF	ESP	Sergi Lopez Segu

No.	Pos.	Nation	Player
—	MF	URU	Gustavo Poyet
—	MF	ESP	Nayim
—	MF	ESP	Santiago Aragon
—	MF	ARG	Dario Franco
—	MF	ESP	Geli
—	MF	ESP	Garcia Sanjuan
—	MF	ESP	Oscar
—	MF	ESP	Jose Aurelio Gay
—	FW	ARG	Juan Esnaider
—	FW	ESP	Miguel Pardeza
—	FW	ESP	Francisco Higuera
—	FW	ESP	Loreto

=== Transfers ===
In
Pos.	Name	from	Type
GK	Juanmi	Real Madrid	
GK	José Belman	Real Zaragoza B	
DF	Luis Cuartero	Real Zaragoza B	
MF	Geli	Racing Santander	
MF	Oscar	Sporting Gijon	
FW	José Luis Loreto	Cordoba CF	

Out
Pos.	Name	To	Type
DF	Moises Garcia Leon	Osasuna	
DF	Javier Sanchez Broto	Villarreal CF	
DF	Esteban Gutiérrez	Racing Ferrol	
DF	Pedro Fuertes	Chaves	
DF	Jesus Seba	Osasuna	
DF	Narcis Julia		retired

==== Winter ====
In
Pos.	Name	from	Type
DF	Cafu	Sao Paulo FC	

Out
Pos.	Name	To	Type

== Competitions ==
=== Supercopa ===
27 August 1994 1	Real Zaragoza	0–2	Barcelona	Zaragoza
22:30 CET			Stoichkov 45'; Amor 64'	Stadium: La Romareda; Attendance: 15,000; Referee: Martín Navarrete

30 August 1994 2	Barcelona	4–5 (6-4 agg.)	Real Zaragoza	Barcelona
21:30 CET	Txiki 13', 87'; Stoichkov 50', 69'		Belsué 10'; Esnáider 32'; Higuera 33', 77', 89'	Stadium: Camp Nou; Attendance: 70,000; Referee: Antonio López Nieto

=== La Liga ===
==== League table ====
Pos	Team	Pld	W	D	L	GF	GA	GD	Pts	Qualification or relegation
5	Sevilla (Note: On July 31, 1995, Sevilla and Celta Vigo were relegated to Segunda División B for not providing documentation (an audit) nor making their payments to the Royal Spanish Football Federation within the time limit. The two best qualified teams to be relegated, Albacete and Valladolid were readmitted to La Liga. Later, Sevilla and Celta Vigo claimed that according to the law they had another 15 working days because they made allegations days before. Finally, the solution was to not relegate any involved team and expand the league to 22 teams for the next two seasons.)	38	16	11	11	55	41	+14	43 (Note: SEV: 7 pts; ESP: 3 pts; ZAR: 2 pts)	Qualification for the UEFA Cup first round
6	Espanyol (Note: RCD Español was renamed RCD Espanyol in February 1995.)	38	14	15	9	51	35	+16	43	
7	Zaragoza	38	18	7	13	56	51	+5	43	Qualification for the Cup Winners' Cup first round (Note: Zaragoza was qualified directly for the 1995–96 UEFA Cup Winners' Cup as defending champions.)
8	Athletic Bilbao	38	16	10	12	39	42	−3	42	
9	Oviedo	38	13	13	12	45	42	+3	39	

Source: LFP
Rules for classification: 1) points; 2) head-to-head points; 3) head-to-head goal difference; 4) head-to-head goals scored; 5) goal difference; 6) number of goals scored.

==== Position by round ====
Round	1	2	3	4	5	6	7	8	9	10	11	12	13	14	15	16	17	18	19	20	21	22	23	24	25	26	27	28	29	30	31	32	33	34	35	36	37	38
Ground	A	H	H	A	H	A	H	A	H	A	H	A	H	A	H	A	H	A	H	H	A	A	H	A	H	A	H	A	H	A	H	A	H	A	H	A	H	A
Result	D	W	W	L	W	D	W	W	W	D	W	L	W	W	W	L	L	W	L	L	D	L	W	L	W	D	W	L	W	W	L	W	D	L	W	L	L	D
Position	8	5	4	8	5	6	3	3	1	2	1	3	3	3	2	2	3	3	4	5	4	5	4	5	5	5	4	5	4	4	5	3	4	6	4	6	7	7

Source: Competitive matches
A = Away; H = Home; W = Win; D = Draw; L = Loss; = Leader, 1995–96 UEFA Champions League Group stage; = 1995–96 UEFA Cup First round; = 1994–95 Relegation playoff to 1995–96 Segunda Division; = 1995–96 Segunda Division; R = 1995–96 UEFA Cup Winners' Cup

==== Matches ====
4 September 1994 1	Real Zaragoza	2–2	Tenerife	Zaragoza
	Esnaider 3'; Paqui 69' (o.g.); Belsue (yellow card); Poyet (yellow card); Higuera (yellow card); Pardeza (yellow card); Esnaider (yellow card); Dario Franco (yellow card); Nayim (yellow card)	Report	Ramis 14'; Latorre 28'; Aguilera (yellow card); Latorre (yellow card)	Stadium: La Romareda; Referee: ansuategui roca

11 September 1994 2	Real Sociedad	1–2	Real Zaragoza	San Sebastián
	Kodro 89'; Imaz (yellow card)	Report	80'higuera 86'esnaider cedrun (yellow card) poyet (yellow card)	Stadium: Anoeta; Referee: Garcia Aranda

18 September 1994 3	Real Zaragoza	2–1	Real Oviedo	Zaragoza
	Esnaider 20'; Esnaider 27'; Aguado (yellow card); Solana (yellow card); Poyet (yellow card); Nayim (yellow card); Esnaider (yellow card); Higuera (red card)	Report	(penalty missed) 32' Carlos; 69' Carlos; (yellow card) Jerkan; (yellow card) Prosinecki; (yellow card) Maqueda	Stadium: La Romareda; Referee: Fernandez Marin

24 September 1994 4	Real Valladolid	2–0	Real Zaragoza	Valladolid
	Alberto 53'; Pablo 70'; Ramon (yellow card); Arquero (yellow card); Miguelo (yellow card)	Report	(yellow card) Nayim; (yellow card) Geli; (yellow card) Esnaider	Stadium: José Zorrilla; Referee: Brito Arceo

2 October 1994 5	Real Zaragoza	2-1	FC Barcelona	Zaragoza
	Esnáider 11'; Geli 22'; Caceres (yellow card)	Report	Koeman 75' (pen.); (yellow card) Ferrer; (yellow card) Abelardo; (yellow card) Guardiola	Stadium: La Romareda; Referee: Diaz Vega

9 October 1994 6	Deportivo La Coruña	3 – 3	Real Zaragoza	A Coruña
	Donato 17' (pen.); Barragán 78', 85' (yellow card); Canales (yellow card); Đukić (yellow card); Ribera (red card)	Report	21' Poyet; 37', 48' (pen.) Aragón; (yellow card) Belsué; (yellow card) (yellow-red card) Cáceres; (yellow card) (yellow-red card) Esnáider; (yellow card) Nayim	Stadium: Riazor; Referee: Juan Andújar Oliver

16 October 1994 7	Real Zaragoza	4 – 0	Celta Vigo	Zaragoza
	Poyet 7'; Franco 12'; Higuera 44'; Pardeza 59'; Aguado (yellow card); Loreto (yellow card)	Report	(yellow card) Patxi Salinas; (yellow card) Berges; (yellow card) Carlos Perez; (yellow card) Gudelj	Stadium: La Romareda; Referee: Gonzalo Panadero Martínez

23 October 1994 8	Real Betis	0–1	Real Zaragoza	Seville
	Ureña 6'; Alexis (yellow card); Cañas (yellow card)	Report	87'Higuera; (yellow card) Belsue; Esnaider (yellow card)	Stadium: Benito Villamarín; Referee: Marin Lopez

29 October 1994 9	Real Zaragoza	3–2	Real Madrid	Zaragoza
	Juan Esnáider 7', 52'; Gus Poyet 86'; Solana (yellow card); Poyet (yellow card); Geli (yellow card); Aragon (yellow card); Nayim (yellow card); Esnaider (yellow card)	Report	Zamorano 57'; Amavisca 78'; (yellow card) Quique Sanchez Flores; (yellow card) Míchel	Stadium: La Romareda; Referee: José Rubio Valdivieso

6 November 1994 10	CD Logroñés	0–0	Real Zaragoza	Logroño
	Villanova (yellow card); Herrero (yellow card); Victor Segura (yellow card)	Report	(yellow card) Aragon; (yellow card) Franco	Stadium: Las Gaunas; Referee: Fernandez Marin

20 November 1994 11	Real Zaragoza	1–0	Albacete Balompié	Zaragoza
	Poyet 68'; Aguado (yellow card) 61' (yellow-red card); Solana 16'; Poyet (yellow card); Aragon (yellow card); Nayim (yellow card)	Report	(yellow card) Santi Denia; (yellow card) Fradera; (yellow card) Coco; (yellow card) Zalazar	Stadium: La Romareda; Referee: Rodriguez Martel

27 November 1994 12	Athletic Bilbao	1–0	Real Zaragoza	Bilbao
	Julen Guerrero 51'; Goikoetxea (yellow card); (yellow card) Oskar Vales	Report	(yellow card) Belsué; (yellow card) 65' (yellow-red card) Caceres; (yellow card) Geli; (yellow card) Dario Franco; (yellow card) Esnaider	Stadium: San Mamés; Referee: Lopez Nieto

4 December 1994 13	Real Zaragoza	3–2	Sporting Gijon	Zaragoza
	Geli (penalty missed) 26'; Pardeza 47'; Pardeza 51'; Aragon 56' (pen.); Aragon (yellow card); Esnaider (yellow card)	Report	Pier 10'; Marcos Vales 61'; Muñiz (yellow card); Marcelino (yellow card); Caco Moran (yellow card); Castaño (yellow card)	Stadium: La Romareda; Referee: Barrenechea Montero

11 December 1994 14	Racing Santander	0–1	Real Zaragoza	Santander
	76' (o.g.)Merino; Geli (yellow card); Pardeza (yellow card); Oscar (yellow card)	Report	(yellow card) Ceballos; (yellow card) Quique Setien; (yellow card) 37'Popov; (yellow card) Billabona; (yellow card) Esteban Torre; (yellow card) Christiansen	Stadium: Estadio El Sardinero; Referee: Nuñez Manrique

21 December 1994 15	Real Zaragoza	1–0	RCD Español	Madrid
	Poyet 49'; Aguado (yellow card) 44' (yellow-red card); Nayim (yellow card); Dario Franco (yellow card)	Report	(yellow card) Torres Mestre; (yellow card) Francisco Lluis	Stadium: Estadio Santiago Bernabéu; Referee: García Aranda

8 January 1995 16	SD Compostela	3–2	Real Zaragoza	Compostela
	Christiansen 8'; Ohen 15'; Ohen 46'; Lekumberri (yellow card); Abadia (yellow card)	Report	32'Pardeza; 67' Pardeza; (yellow card) Belsue; (yellow card) Aragon; (yellow card) 62' (yellow-red card) Garcia Sanjuan	Stadium: San Lázaro

15 January 1995 17	Sevilla	2–1	Real Zaragoza	Seville
	Suker 9'; Cortijo 53'; Unzue (yellow card); Prieto (yellow card); Marcos (yellow card)	Report	89'Higuera; (yellow card) Poyet; (yellow card) Aragon; Geli (yellow card); Esnaider (yellow card)	Stadium: Ramón Sánchez Pizjuán; Referee: Ansuategui Roca

22 January 1995 18	Real Zaragoza	3–1	Atlético Madrid	Zaragoza
	Higuera 20' (pen.) (yellow card); Esnaider 41'; Pardeza 89'; Poyet (yellow card); Geli (yellow card); Esnaider (red card) 69'	Report	Kiko 67'; (yellow card) Diego; (yellow card) 83' (yellow-red card) Geli; (yellow card) Ferreira; (yellow card) 74' (yellow-red card) Pirri Mori; (yellow card) Simeone; (penalty missed) 90' Vizcaino; (yellow card) Ruano; (yellow card) Kosecki	Stadium: La Romareda; Referee: Francisco Santamaría Uzqueda

29 January 1995 19	Valencia CF	3-0	Real Zaragoza	Valencia
	Galvez 53'; Fernando 82'; Mijatovic 89' (yellow card); Giner (yellow card); Poyatos (red card) 34'	Report	(yellow card) Solana; (yellow card) Poyet	Stadium: Mestalla; Referee: Brito Arceo

5 February 1995 20	CD Tenerife	2–0	Real Zaragoza	Santa Cruz de Tenerife
	Felipe 6'; Pizzi 51' (yellow card)	Report	(yellow card) Cáceres	Stadium: Estadio Heliodoro Rodríguez; Referee: Marin Lopez

12 February 1995 21	Real Zaragoza	1–1	Real Sociedad	Zaragoza
	Poyet 51' caceres (yellow card) solana (yellow card)	Report	70'Meho Kodro; (yellow card) Aranzabal	Stadium: La Romareda

19 February 1995 22	Real Oviedo	2–1	Real Zaragoza	Oviedo
	Manel 49'; Prosinecki 89'; Berto (yellow card); Jokanovic (yellow card)	Report	Poyet 61'; Belsué (yellow card); Solana (yellow card); García Sanjuan (yellow card); Higuera (yellow card)	Stadium: Carlos Tartiere; Referee: Panadero Martínez

25 February 1995 23	Real Zaragoza	1–0	Real Valladolid	Zaragoza
	Poyet 24' (yellow card); Aragón (yellow card); García Sanjuan (yellow card); Esnaider (red card) 89'	Report	Ferreras (yellow card); Ramon Gracia (yellow card)	Stadium: La Romareda; Referee: López Nieto

4 March 1995 24	FC Barcelona	3-0	Real Zaragoza	Barcelona
	Koeman 15' (pen.); Begiristain 46'; Amor 89'; Eskurza (yellow card)	Report	(red card) 14' Cedrun; (yellow card) Cafú; (yellow card) Belsué; (yellow card) Aguado; (yellow card) Nayim; (yellow card) Aragón	Stadium: Camp Nou; Referee: Rubio Valdivieso

12 March 1995 25	Real Zaragoza	1 – 0	Deportivo La Coruña	Zaragoza
	Pardeza 27'; Aguado (yellow card) 89' (yellow-red card); Aragón (yellow card) 54' (yellow-red card); Poyet (yellow card)	Report	(red card) 80' Donato; (yellow card) Fran; (yellow card) Voro	Stadium: La Romareda; Referee: Juan Brito Arceo

19 March 1995 26	Celta Vigo	0 – 0	Real Zaragoza	Vigo
	(yellow card) Patxi; (yellow card) Salinas; (yellow card) Berges; (yellow card) Desio; (yellow card) Vicente	Report	Cafu (yellow card); Esnaider (yellow card)	Stadium: Balaídos; Referee: César Barrenechea Montero

1 April 1995 27	Real Zaragoza	3–0	Real Betis	Zaragoza
	Esnaider 30' (yellow card); Higuera 54'; Higuera 83'; Cafu (yellow card)	Report	(yellow card) Ureña; (yellow card) Cañas; (yellow card) Cuellar	Stadium: La Romareda; Referee: Garcia Aranda

8 April 1995 28	Real Madrid	3–0	Real Zaragoza	Madrid
	Raúl 19'; Zamorano 77'; Dubovski 79'; Quique Sanchez Flores34'	Report	(yellow card) Aguado; (yellow card) Cáceres; (yellow card) Poyet	Stadium: Santiago Bernabéu; Referee: Manuel Vega

15 April 1995 29	Real Zaragoza	3–0	Logroñés	Zaragoza
	Aguado 18'; Poyet 35'; Esnaider 77'; Higuera (yellow card)	Report	(yellow card) Javi Navarro; (yellow card) Javi Delgado	Stadium: La Romareda; Referee: Panadero Martinez

23 April 1995 30	Albacete	0–3	Real Zaragoza	Albacete
	Fradera (yellow card); Coco (yellow card); Manolo (yellow card)	Report	51' Esnaider; 65' Higuera; 88' Pardeza; (yellow card) 85' (yellow-red card) Alberto Belsué; (yellow card) Geli	Stadium: Carlos Belmonte; Referee: Marin Lopez

29 April 1995 31	Real Zaragoza	1–4	Athletic Bilbao	Zaragoza
	Pardeza 65'; Aragon (penalty missed) 45'; Geli (yellow card)	Report	39'Valverde; 52' (pen.)Larrazabal; 83'Valverde; 88'Julen Guerrero; (yellow card) Valencia; (yellow card) Oskar Vales; (yellow card) Tabuenka	Stadium: La Romareda; Referee: Antonio Martin Navarrete

6 May 1995 32	Sporting Gijon	1–3	Real Zaragoza	Gijón
	Pier 1' sabou (yellow card)	Summary	4'Poyet; 13'Pardeza; 89'Esnaider; 61' Juanmi; (yellow card) Lizarralde; (yellow card) Poyet; (yellow card) Aragon; (yellow card) Cedrun; (yellow card) Oscar	Stadium: El Molinón; Referee: Andradas Asurmendi

14 May 1995 33	Real Zaragoza	1–1	Racing Santander	Zaragoza
	Esnaider 76' (pen.); Solana (red card) 58'; Poyet (yellow card); Iñaki (yellow card)	Report	8' (yellow card) Quique Setien; (yellow card) Popov; (yellow card) Mutiu	Stadium: La Romareda; Referee: Nuñez Manrique

20 May 1995 34	RCD Espanyol	2–0	Real Zaragoza	Barcelona
	Roberto 10'; Ayucar 89'; Pacheta (yellow card)	Report	(yellow card) Belsué; (yellow card) Nayim	Stadium: Sarrià; Referee: Díaz Vega

28 May 1995 35	Real Zaragoza	5–3	Compostela	Zaragoza
	5'Poyet; 10'Garcia Sanjuan; 18'Pardeza; 58'Esnaider; 64'Esnaider; Poyet (yellow card); Cedrun (red card) 78'	Report	15'Fabiano; 36' Christensen; 87' Ohen; (yellow card) Toño Castro; (yellow card) Modesto	Stadium: La Romareda

4 June 1995 36	Real Zaragoza	0–1	Sevilla FC	Zaragoza
	(yellow card) 88' (yellow-red card) Nayim	Report	Moya 49'; Marcos (yellow card) 88' (yellow-red card); Suker (yellow card)	Stadium: La Romareda; Referee: Marin Lopez

11 June 1995 37	Atlético Madrid	2–0	Real Zaragoza	Madrid
	Geli 23' (pen.); Manolo 89'; Toni Muñoz (yellow card); Pirri Mori (yellow card); Simeone (yellow card)	Report	(yellow card) Juanmi; (yellow card) Aguado; (yellow card) 61' (yellow-red card) Geli	Stadium: Vicente Calderón Stadium; Referee: José Andradas Asurmendi

18 June 1995 38	Real Zaragoza	2-2	Valencia CF	Zaragoza
	Iñigo 48'; Esnaider 73' (pen.)	Report	53'Fernando; 59'Arroyo; (yellow card) Mendieta	Stadium: La Romareda; Referee: Contador Crespo

=== Copa del Rey ===
==== Eightfinals ====
8 February 1995	Albacete Balompié	2–1	Real Zaragoza	Albacete
21:00 CET	Morientes 60'; Fonseca 79'	Report (in Spanish)	Óscar 81'	Stadium: Carlos Belmonte; Attendance: — Referee: Esquinas Torres (Community of Madrid)

15 February 1995	Real Zaragoza	1–1	Albacete Balompié	Zaragoza
20:15 CET	Esnáider 86'	Report (in Spanish)	Morientes 50'	Stadium: La Romareda; Attendance: 20,000; Referee: Pajares Paz (Extremadura)

=== UEFA Cup Winners' Cup ===
==== Round of 32 ====
15 September 1994	Gloria Bistrița (Romania)	2–1	(Spain) Real Zaragoza	Bistrița
16:30	Răduță 51'; Lungu 52'	Report	Esnáider 44'	Stadium: Stadionul Gloria; Attendance: 7,000; Referee: Ahmet Çakar (Turkey)

29 September 1994	Real Zaragoza (Spain)	4–0	(Romania) Gloria Bistrița	Valencia
20:30	Pardeza 11'; Aguado 40'; Poyet 48', 56'	Report		Stadium: Mestalla; Attendance: 4,500; Referee: Andrew Waddell (Scotland)

==== Round of 16 ====
20 October 1994	Tatran Prešov (Slovakia)	0–4	(Spain) Real Zaragoza	Prešov
20:15		Report	Poyet 26'; Varga 44' (o.g.); Esnáider 50', 88'	Stadium: Štadión 1. FC Tatran Prešov; Attendance: 12,105; Referee: José Mendes Pratas (Portugal)

3 November 1994	Real Zaragoza (Spain)	2–1	(Slovakia) Tatran Prešov	Valencia
20:30	Esnáider 6'; Luis Celada 55'	Report	Kočiš 38'	Stadium: Mestalla; Attendance: 2,500; Referee: Dermot Gallagher (England)

==== Quarter-finals ====
2 March 1995	Feyenoord (Netherlands)	1–0	(Spain) Real Zaragoza	Rotterdam
20:00	Larsson 62'	Report		Stadium: De Kuip; Attendance: 41,920; Referee: Ilkka Koho (Finland)

16 March 1995	Real Zaragoza (Spain)	2–0	(Netherlands) Feyenoord	Zaragoza
20:30	Pardeza 59'; Esnáider 72'	Report		Stadium: La Romareda; Attendance: 25,000; Referee: Markus Merk (Germany)

==== Semi-finals ====
6 April 1995	Real Zaragoza (Spain)	3–0	(England) Chelsea	Zaragoza
21:15	Pardeza 8'; Esnáider 26', 57'	Report		Stadium: La Romareda; Attendance: 35,000; Referee: Leif Sundell (Sweden)

20 April 1995	Chelsea (England)	3–1 (3–4 agg.)	(Spain) Real Zaragoza	London
20:00	Furlong 31'; Sinclair 62'; Stein 86'	Report	Aragón 55'	Stadium: Stamford Bridge; Attendance: 26,456; Referee: Jorge Monteiro Coroado (Portugal)

==== Final ====
10 May 1995	Arsenal (England)	1–2	(Spain) Real Zaragoza	Paris
20:15 CEST	Hartson 75'	Report	Esnáider 67'; Nayim 119'	Stadium: Parc des Princes; Attendance: 42,424; Referee: Piero Ceccarini (Italy)

== Statistics ==
=== Players statistics ===
No.	Pos	Nat	Player	Total		La Liga		UEFA		Copa del Rey	
No.	Pos	Nat	Player	Apps	Goals	Apps	Goals	Apps	Goals	Apps	Goals
	GK	(Spain) ESP	Cedrún	34	-40	27+1	-34	5	-4	1	-2
	DF	(Spain) ESP	Belsue	46	0	36	0	8	0	2	0
	DF	(Spain) ESP	Aguado	43	2	33	1	8	1	2	0
	DF	(Argentina) ARG	Caceres	42	0	31	0	9	0	2	0
	DF	(Spain) ESP	Solana	36	0	28	0	6	0	2	0
	MF	(Uruguay) URU	Poyet	42	14	32+2	11	7	3	1	0
	MF	(Spain) ESP	Nayim	44	1	28+5	0	7+2	1	1+1	0
	MF	(Spain) ESP	Aragon	44	4	35	3	8	1	1	0
	FW	(Argentina) ARG	Esnaider	43	25	32	16	9	8	2	1
	FW	(Spain) ESP	Pardeza	43	14	27+7	11	6+1	3	1+1	0
	FW	(Spain) ESP	Higuera	36	8	25+1	8	8	0	2	0
	GK	(Spain) ESP	Juanmi	17	-21	11+1	-16	4	-4	1	-1
	MF	(Spain) ESP	Geli	40	1	22+8	1	4+4	0	1+1	0
	MF	(Spain) ESP	Garcia Sanjuan	32	1	19+6	1	3+3	0	1	0
	DF	(Brazil) BRA	Cafu	19	0	10+6	0	1	0	1+1	0
	MF	(Spain) ESP	Oscar	26	2	6+13	0	2+4	1	1	1
	MF	(Argentina) ARG	Franco	16	1	5+10	1	1	0		
	FW	(Spain) ESP	Loreto	15	0	1+11	0	1+2	0		
	DF	(Spain) ESP	Lizarralde	7	0	0+4	0	2+1	0		
	DF	(Spain) ESP	Sergi	2	0	0+2	0	0	0		
	MF	(Spain) ESP	Gay	6	0	2+4	0				
	GK	(Spain) ESP	Belman	1	-1	0+1	-1	0	0		
	DF	(Spain) ESP	Cuartero	1	0	0+1	0				
	FW	(Spain) ESP	Iñigo	1	1	0+1	1				

- Source: https://www.bdfutbol.com/en/t/t1994-9539.html

== See also ==
- BDFutbol
