= 1995 UEFA Super Cup =

Zaragoza	Ajax
(Spain)	(Netherlands)
1	5
- on aggregate

First leg
Zaragoza	Ajax
1	1
- Date: 6 February 1996
- Venue: La Romareda, Zaragoza
- Referee: Rémi Harrel (France)
- Attendance: 23,000

Second leg
Ajax	Zaragoza
4	0
- Date: 28 February 1996
- Venue: Olympic Stadium, Amsterdam
- Referee: Leslie Mottram (Scotland)
- Attendance: 22,000

The 1995 UEFA Super Cup was a two-legged match contested between the UEFA Cup Winners' Cup holders Zaragoza and the UEFA Champions League holders Ajax. The cup was played later than usual, the two legs taking place in February 1996. The first leg was drawn 1–1 at La Romareda in Zaragoza. The second leg was won 4–0 by Ajax at the Olympic Stadium in Amsterdam. Ajax won 5–1 on aggregate.

== Match details ==
=== First leg ===
6 February 1996
20:30 CET

Zaragoza (Spain)	1–1	(Netherlands) Ajax
Aguado 28'	Report	Kluivert 70'

La Romareda, Zaragoza
Attendance: 23,000
Referee: Rémi Harrel (France)

Zaragoza	Ajax

GK	1	(Spain) Juanmi
RB	2	(Spain) Alberto Belsué (c)
CB	4	(Spain) Luis Cuartero
CB	6	(Spain) Xavi Aguado
LB	3	(Spain) Jesús Solana	(yellow card) 88'
DM	5	(Spain) Óscar
CM	8	(Spain) Nayim	(yellow card) 39'
RW	10	(Spain) Francisco Higuera
LW	7	(Argentina) Gustavo López		(substituted off) 79'
SS	11	(Spain) Dani		(substituted off) 79'
CF	9	(Spain) Fernando Morientes
Substitutes:
GK	13	(Spain) Andoni Cedrún
DF	12	(Spain) Paqui
MF	14	(Spain) José Aurelio Gay
MF	15	(Argentina) Sergio Berti		(substituted on) 79'
FW	16	(Spain) Miguel Pardeza		(substituted on) 79'
Manager:
(Spain) Víctor Fernández

GK	1	(Netherlands) Edwin van der Sar
RB	2	(Netherlands) Michael Reiziger
CB	3	(Netherlands) Danny Blind (c)
CB	4	(Netherlands) Frank de Boer
LB	5	(Netherlands) Winston Bogarde
DM	6	(Netherlands) Arnold Scholten	(yellow card) 81'
CM	8	(Netherlands) Kiki Musampa		(substituted off) 53'
AM	10	(Finland) Jari Litmanen		(substituted off) 65'
RW	7	(Nigeria) Finidi George
LW	11	(Netherlands) Ronald de Boer	(yellow card) 36'
CF	9	(Netherlands) Patrick Kluivert
Substitutes:
GK	12	(Netherlands) Fred Grim
DF	13	(Netherlands) Sonny Silooy
MF	14	(Netherlands) Dave van den Bergh		(substituted on) 53'
FW	15	(Nigeria) Nwankwo Kanu
FW	16	(Netherlands) Nordin Wooter	(yellow card) 80'	(substituted on) 65'
Manager:
(Netherlands) Louis van Gaal

Assistant referees:
Alain Gourdet (France)
Jacques Poudevigne (France)
Fourth official:
Bernard Saules (France)

Match rules

- 90 minutes
- Five named substitutes
- Maximum of three substitutions

=== Second leg ===
28 February 1996
18:30 CET

Ajax (Netherlands)	4–0	(Spain) Zaragoza
Bogarde 43'; George 54'; Blind 65' (pen.), 69' (pen.)	Report

Olympic Stadium, Amsterdam
Attendance: 22,000
Referee: Leslie Mottram (Scotland)

Ajax	Zaragoza

GK	1	(Netherlands) Edwin van der Sar
RB	2	(Netherlands) Michael Reiziger
CB	3	(Netherlands) Danny Blind (c)
CB	4	(Netherlands) Frank de Boer	(yellow card) 26'
LB	5	(Netherlands) Winston Bogarde
DM	6	(Netherlands) Arnold Scholten		(substituted off) 78'
RM	7	(Nigeria) Finidi George		(substituted off) 70'
CM	8	(Netherlands) Edgar Davids
LM	11	(Netherlands) Sonny Silooy
SS	9	(Nigeria) Nwankwo Kanu
CF	10	(Netherlands) Patrick Kluivert		(substituted off) 70'
Substitutes:
GK	12	(Netherlands) Fred Grim
MF	13	(Netherlands) Robert Gehring		(substituted on) 70'
FW	14	(Netherlands) Kiki Musampa
FW	15	(Ukraine) Andriy Demchenko		(substituted on) 70'
FW	16	(Netherlands) Dave van den Bergh		(substituted on) 78'
Manager:
(Netherlands) Louis van Gaal

GK	1	(Spain) Andoni Cedrún	(red card) 64'
RB	2	(Spain) Alberto Belsué (c)
CB	6	(Spain) Xavi Aguado
CB	4	(Argentina) Fernando Cáceres
LB	5	(Spain) Óscar	(red card) 68'
RM	10	(Spain) Francisco Higuera		(substituted off) 63'
CM	3	(Spain) Jesús García Sanjuán
CM	8	(Spain) Santiago Aragón
LM	7	(Argentina) Gustavo López	(yellow card) 30'	(substituted off) 61'
CF	9	(Spain) Fernando Morientes		(substituted off) 80'
CF	11	(Spain) Dani García
Substitutes:
GK	13	(Spain) José Belman	(substituted on) 63'
DF	12	(Spain) Luis Cuartero	(substituted on) 80'
DF	14	(Spain) Paqui
MF	15	(Spain) José Aurelio Gay	(substituted on) 61'
MF	16	(Argentina) Sergio Berti
Manager:
(Spain) Víctor Fernández

Fourth official:
Hugh Dallas (Scotland)

Match rules

- 90 minutes
- 30 minutes of golden goal extra time if necessary
- Penalty shoot-out if scores still level
- Five named substitutes
- Maximum of three substitutions

== See also ==
- 1995–96 UEFA Champions League
- 1995–96 UEFA Cup Winners' Cup
- 1995–96 AFC Ajax season
- 1995–96 Real Zaragoza season
- AFC Ajax in international football
- Real Zaragoza in European football
