= 1995 UEFA Cup Winners' Cup final =

Football match between Arsenal and Zaragoza

- Match programme cover
- Event: 1994–95 UEFA Cup Winners' Cup
Arsenal	Zaragoza
(England)	(Spain)
1	2
- After extra time
- Date: 10 May 1995
- Venue: Parc des Princes, Paris
- Referee: Piero Ceccarini (Italy)
- Attendance: 42,424

The 1995 UEFA Cup Winners' Cup final was a football match on 10 May 1995 contested between cup holders Arsenal of England and Zaragoza of Aragon. The final was held at Parc des Princes in Paris. It was the final match of the 1994–95 UEFA Cup Winners' Cup, 35th UEFA Cup Winners' Cup final, and the first since the tournament changed name from the European Cup Winners' Cup. Zaragoza won the match 2–1 after extra time, preventing Arsenal from retaining the trophy that they had won in 1994.

The first half was goalless. In the second half, Zaragoza's Juan Esnáider opened the scoring, before John Hartson scored Arsenal's equaliser. The game went into extra time and looked to be heading to a penalty shoot-out. However, with seconds remaining, former Tottenham midfielder, Nayim, scored a last-minute goal with a 40-yard lob over Arsenal goalkeeper, David Seaman, securing the win for Zaragoza.

This match marked the debut of the electronic substitution board for fourth officials in UEFA competitions. The board was supplied by the Italian company AMB Elettronic.

== Route to the final ==
(England) Arsenal					(Spain) Zaragoza			
Opponent	Agg.	1st leg	2nd leg		Opponent	Agg.	1st leg	2nd leg
(Cyprus) Omonia	6–1	3–1 (A)	3–0 (H)	First round	(Romania) Gloria Bistrița	5–2	1–2 (A)	4–0 (H)
(Denmark) Brøndby	4–3	2–1 (A)	2–2 (H)	Second round	(Slovakia) Tatran Prešov	6–1	4–0 (A)	2–1 (H)
(France) Auxerre	2–1	1–1 (H)	1–0 (A)	Quarter-finals	(Netherlands) Feyenoord	2–1	0–1 (A)	2–0 (H)
(Italy) Sampdoria	5–5 (3–2 p)	3–2 (H)	2–3 (a.e.t.) (A)	Semi-finals	(England) Chelsea	4–3	3–0 (H)	1–3 (A)

== Match ==
=== Details ===
10 May 1995
20:15 CEST

Arsenal (England)	1–2 (a.e.t.)	(Spain) Zaragoza
Hartson 75'	Report	Esnáider 68'; Nayim 119'

Parc des Princes, Paris
Attendance: 42,424
Referee: Piero Ceccarini (Italy)

Arsenal	Zaragoza

GK	1	(England) David Seaman
CB	6	(England) Tony Adams (c)
CB	5	(England) Andy Linighan
CB	7	(England) Martin Keown		(substituted off) 46'
RM	2	(England) Lee Dixon
CM	11	(England) Ray Parlour
CM	4	(Sweden) Stefan Schwarz
LM	3	(England) Nigel Winterburn		(substituted off) 47'
AM	10	(England) Paul Merson	(yellow card) 32'
CF	9	(Wales) John Hartson	(yellow card) 2'
CF	8	(England) Ian Wright
Substitutes:
DF	12	(Northern Ireland) Steve Morrow		(substituted on) 47'
MF	13	(England) David Hillier		(substituted on) 46'
MF	14	(Republic of Ireland) Eddie McGoldrick
FW	15	(England) Chris Kiwomya
GK	16	(England) Vince Bartram
Manager:
(Scotland) Stewart Houston

GK	1	(Spain) Andoni Cedrún
RB	2	(Spain) Alberto Belsué	(yellow card) 66'
CB	6	(Spain) Xavi Aguado
CB	4	(Argentina) Fernando Cáceres
LB	3	(Spain) Jesús Solana
CM	5	(Spain) Nayim	(yellow card) 105'
CM	8	(Spain) Santiago Aragón	(yellow card) 85'
AM	11	(Uruguay) Gus Poyet
RF	10	(Spain) Francisco Higuera	(yellow card) 6'	(substituted off) 67'
CF	9	(Argentina) Juan Esnáider
LF	7	(Spain) Miguel Pardeza (c)
Substitutes:
MF	12	(Spain) Óscar
GK	13	(Spain) José Belman
MF	14	(Spain) Jesús García Sanjuán		(substituted on) 67'	(substituted off) 114'
MF	15	(Spain) Geli			(substituted on) 114'
FW	16	(Spain) José Luis Loreto
Manager:
(Spain) Víctor Fernández

Assistant referees:
Maurizio Padovan (Italy)
Enrico Preziosi (Italy)
Fourth official:
Marcello Nicchi (Italy)

Match rules

- 90 minutes
- 30 minutes of golden goal extra time if necessary
- Penalty shoot-out if scores still level
- Five named substitutes
- Maximum of two substitutions

=== Statistics ===
First half
	Arsenal	Zaragoza
Goals scored	0	0
Total shots	2	7
Shots on target	1	0
Ball possession	50%	50%
Corner kicks	1	2
Fouls committed	—N/a	—N/a
Offsides	2	3
Yellow cards	2	1
Red cards	0	0

Second half
	Arsenal	Zaragoza
Goals scored	1	1
Total shots	5	15
Shots on target	3	3
Ball possession	49%	51%
Corner kicks	1	2
Fouls committed	—N/a	—N/a
Offsides	5	8
Yellow cards	0	2
Red cards	0	0

Extra time
	Arsenal	Zaragoza
Goals scored	0	1
Total shots	6	22
Shots on target	3	6
Ball possession	50%	50%
Corner kicks	2	3
Fouls committed	—N/a	—N/a
Offsides	6	8
Yellow cards	0	1
Red cards	0	0

Overall
	Arsenal	Zaragoza
Goals scored	1	2
Total shots	13	44
Shots on target	7	9
Ball possession	—N/a	—N/a
Corner kicks	4	7
Fouls committed	—N/a	—N/a
Offsides	13	19
Yellow cards	2	4
Red cards	0	0

== See also ==
- 1994–95 UEFA Cup Winners' Cup
- 1995 UEFA Champions League Final
- 1995 UEFA Cup Final
- 1995 UEFA Super Cup
- Arsenal F.C. in European football
