= Fiorucci Trophy =

1993 Fiorucci Trophy
Tournament details
- Venue: White Hart Lane
- Dates: 27 April 1993
- Teams: 3

Final positions
- Champions: (Spain) Real Madrid (1st title)
- Runners-up: (Italy) Inter Milan
- Third place: (England) Tottenham Hotspur

Tournament statistics
- Matches played: 3
- Goals scored: 4 (1.33 per match)
- Attendance: 22,683 (7,561 per match)
- Top goal scorer(s): (Spain) Juan Esnáider (3 goals)

The Fiorucci Trophy was an invitational football tournament held at White Hart Lane, London. The only edition took place on 27 April 1993. It was a triangular round robin format contested by teams from Italy, Spain, and host nation England.

== Tournament ==
- Each match lasted 45 minutes each. Drawn matches were resolved by extra-time and then penalties.

=== Results ===
27 April 1993 Round 1	Tottenham Hotspur	0–1	Real Madrid	Tottenham
			Esnáider 25'	Stadium: White Hart Lane; Attendance: 7,651

27 April 1993 Round 2	Tottenham Hotspur	0–0 (5–6 p)	Inter Milan	Tottenham
				Stadium: White Hart Lane; Attendance: 7,651

27 April 1993 Round 3	Real Madrid	2–1	Inter Milan	Tottenham
	Zamorano 23'; Esnáider 37'		Fontolan 15'	Stadium: White Hart Lane; Attendance: 7,651

=== Final standings ===
Team	Pld	W	PW	PL	L	GF	GA	GD	Pts
(Spain) Real Madrid	2	2	0	0	0	3	1	+2	6
(Italy) Inter Milan	2	1	1	0	0	1	2	-1	2
(England) Tottenham Hotspur	2	0	0	1	1	0	2	−2	1
