= Real Zaragoza in European football =

Spanish club in European football

- Club: Real Zaragoza
- Seasons played: 18
- First entry: 1962–63 Inter-Cities Fairs Cup
- Latest entry: 2007–08 UEFA Cup

Titles
- Cup Winners' Cup: 1: 1995
- Inter-Cities Fairs Cup: 1: 1964

These are the matches that Real Zaragoza have played in European football competitions.

== UEFA-organised seasonal competitions ==
Real Zaragoza's score listed first.

=== European Cup Winners' Cup / UEFA Cup Winners' Cup ===
Season	Round	Opposing team	Home	Away	Aggregate
1964–65	First round	(Malta) Valletta	5–1	3–0	8–1
1964–65	Second round	(Scotland) Dundee	2–1	2–2	4–3
1964–65	Quarter-final	(Wales) Cardiff City	2–2	1–0	3–2
1964–65	Semi-final	(England) West Ham United	1–1	1–2	2–3
1966–67	First round	(Norway) Skeid Fotball	3–1	2–3	5–4
1966–67	Second round	(England) Everton	2–0	0–1	2–1
1966–67	Quarter-final	(Scotland) Rangers	2–0	0–2	2–2 (c)
1986–87	First round	(Italy) Roma	2–0	0–2	2–2 (3–4 p)
1986–87	Second round	(Wales) Wrexham	0–0	2–2 (a.e.t.)	2–2 (a)
1986–87	Quarter-final	(Bulgaria) Vitosha Sofia	2–0	2–0	4–0
1986–87	Semi-final	(Netherlands) Ajax	2–3	0–3	2–6
1994–95	First round	(Romania) Gloria Bistrița	4–0	1–2	5–2
1994–95	Second round	(Slovakia) Tatran Prešov	2–1	4–0	6–1
1994–95	Quarter-final	(Netherlands) Feyenoord	2–0	0–1	2–1
1994–95	Semi-final	(England) Chelsea	3–0	1–3	4–3
1994–95	Final	(England) Arsenal	2–1 (a.e.t.) (N)		
1995–96	First round	(Slovakia) Inter Bratislava	3–1	2–0	5–1
1995–96	Second round	(Belgium) Club Brugge	2–1	1–0	3–1
1995–96	Quarter-finals	(Spain) Deportivo La Coruña	1–1	0–1	1–2

=== UEFA Cup ===
Season	Round	Opposing team	Home	Away	Aggregate
1974–75	First round	(Portugal) Vitória de Setúbal	4–0	1–1	5–1
1974–75	Second round	(Switzerland) Grasshopper	5–0	1–2	6–2
1974–75	Third round	(West Germany) Borussia Mönchengladbach	2–4	0–5	2–9
1975–76	First round	(Czechoslovakia) Inter Bratislava	2–3	0–5	2–8
1989–90	First round	(Cyprus) Apollon Limassol	1–1	3–0	4–1
1989–90	Second round	(West Germany) Hamburg	1–0	0–2 (a.e.t.)	1–2
1992–93	First round	(France) Caen	2–0	2–3	4–3
1992–93	Second round	(Denmark) BK Frem	1–0	5–1	6–1
1992–93	Third round	(Germany) Borussia Dortmund	2–1	1–3	3–4
2000–01	First round	(Poland) Wisła Kraków	4–1	1–4 (a.e.t.)	5–5 (3–4 p)
2001–02	First round	(Denmark) Silkeborg	3–0	2–1	5–1
2001–02	Second round	(Switzerland) Servette	0–0	0–1	0–1
2004–05	First round	(Czech Republic) Sigma Olomouc	1–0	3–2	4–2
2004–05	Group C	(Netherlands) Utrecht	2–0	—	2nd
2004–05	Group C	Austria Wien	—	0–1	2nd
2004–05	Group C	(Ukraine) Dnipro Dnipropetrovsk	2–1	—	2nd
2004–05	Group C	(Belgium) Club Brugge	—	1–1	2nd
2004–05	Round of 32	(Turkey) Fenerbahçe	2–1	1–0	3–1
2004–05	Round of 16	Austria Wien	2–2	1–1	3–3 (a)
2007–08	First round	(Greece) Aris Thessaloniki	2–1	0–1	2–2 (a)

=== UEFA Super Cup ===
Season	Round	Opposing team	Home	Away	Aggregate
1995	Final	(Netherlands) Ajax	1–1	0–4	1–5

== UEFA-non organised seasonal competitions ==
=== Inter-Cities Fairs Cup ===
Season	Round	Opposing team	Home	Away	Neutral	Aggregate
1962–63	First round	(Northern Ireland) Glentoran	6–2	2–0	—	8–2
1962–63	Second round	(Italy) Roma	2–4	2–1	—	4–5
1963–64	First round	(Greece) Iraklis	6–1	3–0	—	9–1
1963–64	Second round	(Switzerland) Lausanne-Sport	3–0	2–1	—	5–1
1963–64	Quarter-final	(Italy) Juventus	3–2	0–0	—	3–2
1963–64	Semi-final	(Belgium) Liegeois	2–1	0–1	2–0	4–2
1963–64	Final	(Spain) Valencia	2–1 (N)			
1965–66	Second round	(Ireland) Shamrock Rovers	2–1	1–1	—	3–2
1965–66	Third round	(Scotland) Heart of Midlothian	2–2	3–3	1–0	6–5
1965–66	Quarter-final	(Scotland) Dunfermline Athletic	4–2	0–1	—	4–3
1965–66	Semi-final	(England) Leeds United	1–0	1–2	3–1	5–3
1965–66	Final	(Spain) Barcelona	2–4 (a.e.t.)	1–0	—	3–4
1967–68	First round	(Netherlands) Utrecht	3–1	2–3	—	5–4
1967–68	Second round	(Hungary) Ferencvárosi	2–1	0–3	—	2–4
1968–69	First round	(Bulgaria) Botev Plovdiv	2–0	1–3	—	3–3 (a)
1968–69	Second round	(Scotland) Aberdeen	3–0	1–2	—	4–2
1968–69	Third round	(England) Newcastle United	3–2	1–2	—	4–4 (a)

== Finals ==
Year	Competition	Opposing Team	Score	Venue
1964	Fairs Cup	(Spain) Valencia	2–1	(Spain) Camp Nou, Barcelona
1966	Fairs Cup	(Spain) Barcelona	3–4 on aggregate	Two-legged
1995	Cup Winners' Cup	(England) Arsenal	2–1	(France) Parc des Princes, Paris
1995	UEFA Super Cup	(Netherlands) Ajax	1–5 on aggregate	Two-legged

=== Overall record ===
As of 4 October 2007

Competition	Pld	W	D	L	GF	GA	GD
UEFA Cup	36	18	6	12	60	49	+11
Cup Winners' Cup	37	20	6	11	64	38	+26
Super Cup	2	0	1	1	1	5	-4
Fairs Cup	36	22	4	10	74	48	+26
Total	111	60	17	34	199	140	+59

== Honours ==
- UEFA Cup Winners' Cup

Winners: 1994–95
Semi-finals: 1964–65, 1986–87
Quarter-finals: 1967–68, 1995–96

- UEFA Super Cup

Runners-up: 1995

- Fairs Cup

Winners: 1963–64
Runners-up: 1965–66

== Succession Boxes ==
Preceded by (Spain) Valencia	Fairs Cup Champions; 1963–64; Runner up: (Spain) Valencia	Succeeded by (Hungary) Ferencvárosi
Preceded by (England) Arsenal	UEFA Cup Winners' Cup Champions; 1994–95; Runner up: (England) Arsenal	Succeeded by (France) Paris Saint-Germain
