= CD Comillas =

Spanish football club

Comillas
- Full name: Club Deportivo Comillas
- Founded: 1926
- Ground: Rubárcena, Comillas, Cantabria, Spain
- Capacity: 1,000
- President: Pedro Velarde
- Manager: Nacho Díaz
- League: Segunda Regional – Group A
- 2024–25: Segunda Regional – Group A, 6th of 18
Home colours	Away colours

Club Deportivo Comillas is a football team based in Comillas, in the autonomous community of Cantabria. Founded in 1926, the team plays in Segunda Regional – Group A. The club's home ground is Campo de Fútbol Rubárcena, which has a capacity of 1,000 spectators.

== Season to season ==
Season	Tier	Division	Place	Copa del Rey
1933–34	6	3ª Reg.	3rd	
1934–35	6	3ª Reg.	4th	
1935–36	6	3ª Reg.	1st	
1936–1956	DNP			
1956–57	5	2ª Reg.	4th	
1957–58	5	2ª Reg.	3rd	
1958–59	4	1ª Reg.	12th	
1959–60	4	1ª Reg.	14th	
1960–61	5	2ª Reg.	4th	
1961–62	4	1ª Reg.	10th	
1962–1977	DNP			
1977–78	7	2ª Reg.	8th	
1978–79	7	2ª Reg.	1st	
1979–80	6	1ª Reg.	9th	
1980–81	6	1ª Reg.	6th	
1981–82	6	1ª Reg.	7th	
1982–83	6	1ª Reg.	2nd	
1983–84	5	Reg. Pref.	16th	
1984–85	5	Reg. Pref.	20th	
1985–86	6	1ª Reg.	3rd	

Season	Tier	Division	Place	Copa del Rey
1986–87	5	Reg. Pref.	11th	
1987–88	5	Reg. Pref.	12th	
1988–89	5	Reg. Pref.	14th	
1989–90	5	Reg. Pref.	1st	
1990–91	4	3ª	10th	
1991–92	4	3ª	4th	
1992–93	4	3ª	6th	First round
1993–94	4	3ª	13th	Second round
1994–95	4	3ª	5th	
1995–96	4	3ª	7th	
1996–97	4	3ª	6th	
1997–98	4	3ª	14th	
1998–99	4	3ª	14th	
1999–2000	4	3ª	18th	
2000–01	5	Reg. Pref.	3rd	
2001–02	4	3ª	18th	
2002–03	5	Reg. Pref.	3rd	
2003–04	4	3ª	18th	
2004–05	5	Reg. Pref.	18th	
2005–06	6	1ª Reg.	11th	

Season	Tier	Division	Place	Copa del Rey
2006–07	6	1ª Reg.	4th	
2007–08	6	1ª Reg.	2nd	
2008–09	5	Reg. Pref.	14th	
2009–10	5	Reg. Pref.	7th	
2010–11	5	Reg. Pref.	10th	
2011–12	5	Reg. Pref.	12th	
2012–13	5	Reg. Pref.	17th	
2013–14	6	1ª Reg.	9th	
2014–15	6	1ª Reg.	15th	
2015–16	6	1ª Reg.	7th	
2016–17	6	1ª Reg.	18th	
2017–18	7	2ª Reg.	18th	
2018–19	7	2ª Reg.	8th	
2019–20	7	2ª Reg.	2nd	
2020–21	6	1ª Reg.	8th	
2021–22	8	2ª Reg.	8th	
2022–23	8	2ª Reg.	9th	
2023–24	8	2ª Reg.	13th	
2024–25	8	2ª Reg.	6th	
2025–26	8	2ª Reg.		

- 12 seasons in Tercera División
