= Emiliano Franco =

Argentine footballer (born 1994)

Personal information
- Full name: Emiliano Franco Pola
- Date of birth: 21 October 1994 (age 32)
- Place of birth: Zaragoza, Spain
- Height: 1.82 m (6 ft 0 in)
- Position: Attacking midfielder

Senior career*
Years	Team	Apps	(Gls)
2016–2017	Newell's Old Boys	2	(0)
2017–2018	Douglas Haig	20	(0)
2018–2019	Defensores de Belgrano	18	(0)
2019	Huracán Las Heras	2	(0)
2020	AD Oliveirense	4	(0)
2020–2021	Ibiza	15	(3)
2021	UE Sant Julià	6	(0)
2022	Tepatitlán	27	(1)
2023	Mitre	9	(0)
2024	San Telmo	34	(2)
2025–	Deportivo Morón	22	(2)
- * Club domestic league appearances and goals as of 17:33, 4 August 2025 (UTC)

Emiliano Franco Pola (born 21 October 1994) he is a Spanish-born Argentine football player. He plays as an attacking midfielder for Deportivo Morón.

== Career ==
Franco started his career with Newell's Old Boys. He made his professional debut with the club during the 2016 Argentine Primera División season, playing the final thirty-two minutes of a 2–0 defeat to Temperley on 15 May 2016. He made one further appearance a week later against Atlético Tucumán. On 27 August 2017, Franco joined Torneo Federal A side Douglas Haig. His first appearance arrived on 4 October versus Gimnasia y Esgrima. Ahead of the 2018–19 Torneo Federal A, Franco was signed by Defensores de Belgrano. After eighteen appearances, Franco then spent 2019–20 with Huracán Las Heras.

In 2020, Franco switched Argentina for Portugal after agreeing terms with AD Oliveirense. He made his debut in a Campeonato de Portugal defeat to Marítimo B on 9 February, which preceded three further appearances before the season's curtailment due to the COVID-19 pandemic. The succeeding September saw Franco move to Spain with Tercera División team Ibiza. He scored his first senior goal on debut against Manacor on 10 January. His next goal arrived on 21 March versus Felanitx.

== Personal life ==
He is the son of former Argentina international footballer Darío Franco. Franco became stranded in Portugal during the COVID-19 pandemic, having also not been paid since his arrival. He managed to return to his homeland in May after the Associação de Emergência Humanitária intervened.

== Career statistics ==
As of 21 March 2021.

Club statistics
Club	Season	League			Cup		League Cup		Continental		Other		Total	
Club	Season	Division	Apps	Goals	Apps	Goals	Apps	Goals	Apps	Goals	Apps	Goals	Apps	Goals
Newell's Old Boys	2016	Primera División	2	0	0	0	—		—		0	0	2	0
Newell's Old Boys	2016–17	Primera División	0	0	0	0	—		—		0	0	0	0
Newell's Old Boys	Total		2	0	0	0	—		—		0	0	2	0
Douglas Haig	2017–18	Torneo Federal A	20	0	4	0	—		—		0	0	24	0
Defensores de Belgrano	2018–19	Torneo Federal A	18	0	2	0	—		—		0	0	20	0
Huracán Las Heras	2019–20	Torneo Federal A	2	0	0	0	—		—		0	0	2	0
AD Oliveirense	2019–20	Campeonato de Portugal	4	0	0	0	—		—		0	0	4	0
Ibiza	2020–21	Tercera División	8	2	0	0	0	0	—		0	0	8	2
Career total			54	2	6	0	0	0	—		0	0	60	2
