= Darío Franco =

Argentine footballer and manager (born 1969)

Personal information
- Full name: Darío Javier Franco Gatti
- Date of birth: 17 January 1969 (age 57)
- Place of birth: Cruz Alta, Argentina
- Height: 1.89 m (6 ft 2 in)
- Position: Defensive midfielder

Team information
- Current team: Gimnasia Mendoza (manager)

Youth career
- Newell's Old Boys

Senior career*
Years	Team	Apps	(Gls)
1988–1991	Newell's Old Boys	100	(4)
1991–1995	Zaragoza	91	(7)
1995–1997	Club Atlas	85	(11)
1998–2004	Morelia	241	(19)

International career
1991–1994	Argentina	22	(6)

Managerial career
- 2006: Morelia
- 2006–2007: Tecos UAG
- 2008–2009: Club Atlas
- 2010–2011: San Martín de San Juan
- 2011–2012: Instituto
- 2013: Universidad de Chile
- 2013–2014: Aldosivi
- 2014–2015: Defensa y Justicia
- 2015–2016: Colón
- 2016–2017: Aldosivi
- 2017–2018: Instituto
- 2019: San Luis de Quillota
- 2020: Olmedo
- 2022–2023: Gimnasia Jujuy
- 2023: Binacional
- 2023: Almirante Brown
- 2024: Quilmes
- 2025: Arsenal Sarandí
- 2026–: Gimnasia Mendoza
Medal record
Men's football
Representing Argentina
Copa América
Winner	1991 Chile
Winner	1993 Ecuador
FIFA Confederations Cup
Winner	1992 Saudi Arabia
CONMEBOL–UEFA Cup of Champions
Winner	1993 Argentina
- * Club domestic league appearances and goals

Darío Javier Franco Gatti (born 17 January 1969) is an Argentine football manager and former player who played as a midfielder. He is the current manager of Gimnasia Mendoza.

== Playing career ==
=== Club ===
Franco made his football debut in his native country, briefly playing with Newell's Old Boys before joining Spain's Real Zaragoza winning the 1994 Copa del Rey Final and the following season the 1995 UEFA Cup Winners' Cup Final against incumbent Champions and heavy favourites Arsenal F.C. He arrived in Mexico in 1995 to play for Atlas. After three years with the club, he was transferred to Monarcas Morelia, where he won the 2000 championship.

=== International ===
He also played for Argentina's national team, and scored two goals in the 1991 Copa América, which Argentina won. In the 1993 edition, he was selected to replace the banned Claudio Caniggia, but was seriously injured in Argentina's first match.

== Managerial career ==
After his playing career ended, Franco became the manager of Tecos UAG. The president of the club fired him on Saturday, 18 August 2007, after Tecos lost 4–1 to Pachuca in their first game of the season and were then beaten 3–0 by Atlante F.C. in their third game. The only point he earned came from a 0–0 draw against Chivas de Guadalajara in the second game. In Clausura 2009, Franco managed Atlas. After their second game, a 4–0 defeat to Cruz Azul, Franco was fired and was replaced by Ricardo La Volpe.

Between 2010 and 2013, Franco managed San Martín de San Juan and Instituto. In 2013, Franco signed a contract with Universidad de Chile, but he was fired after six months. He managed Aldosivi in 2013 and Defensa y Justicia in 2014. He departed Defensa y Justicia in 2015 and subsequently became manager of Colón. In 2016, after leaving Colón, he returned to Aldosivi to become the club's manager for the second time. He rejoined Instituto de Córdoba on 1 November 2017.

== Honours ==
=== As Player ===
Newell's Old Boys

- Argentine Primera División: 1990-91
- Copa Libertadores runner-up: 1988

Real Zaragoza

- Copa del Rey: 1993-94
- UEFA Cup Winners' Cup: 1994-95

Monarcas Morelia

- Liga MX: 2000

Argentina

- Copa América: 1991, 1993
- CONMEBOL–UEFA Cup of Champions: 1993

=== As Manager ===
Universidad de Chile

- Copa Chile: 2012-13

== Personal life ==
He is the father of the footballers Emiliano, born in Spain, and David Franco, born in Mexico.
