= Geli (footballer) =

Spanish footballer

Personal information
- Full name: Ángel de Juana García
- Date of birth: 15 February 1968 (age 58)
- Place of birth: Santander, Spain
- Height: 1.78 m (5 ft 10 in)
- Position: Midfielder

Senior career*
Years	Team	Apps	(Gls)
1987–1989	Rayo Cantabria	20	(6)
1989–1994	Racing Santander	113	(13)
1994–1995	Zaragoza	30	(1)
1995–1998	Celta	61	(3)
1998–1999	Racing Santander	20	(0)
1999–2000	Extremadura	21	(1)
2000–2004	Gimnástica	55	(2)
Total		320	(26)

Managerial career
- 2014–2016: Celta (youth)
- 2016–2019: Tropezón
- * Club domestic league appearances and goals

Ángel de Juana García (born 15 February 1968), known as Geli, is a Spanish former professional footballer who played as a midfielder.

== Playing career ==
Aged already 25, Geli made his La Liga debut with his hometown club Racing de Santander, courtesy of manager Javier Irureta. He then played a sole season with Real Zaragoza after joining in summer 1994: regularly used in the league, where he scored in a 2–1 home win against FC Barcelona, he also featured the last six minutes of the Aragonese side's 2–1 UEFA Cup Winners' Cup final victory over Arsenal, appearing in a further seven games in the victorious campaign.

During his three seasons at RC Celta de Vigo Geli, who would again reunite with Irureta in his final year, played 61 top-flight matches but also struggled with injuries and loss of form; he did score the club's 1,500th goal in the main division, in a 3–0 away defeat of Real Betis on 3 January 1996. He then returned to Racing, finishing his career at the age of 36 after stints at CF Extremadura (Segunda División) and Gimnástica de Torrelavega (Segunda División B).

Geli later worked as a local commentator in Racing's matches.

== Coaching career ==
On 18 May 2016, Geli was appointed manager of Tercera División club CD Tropezón. In June 2019, he left his post.

== Honours ==
Zaragoza

- UEFA Cup Winners' Cup: 1994–95
