= Jesús García Sanjuán =

Spanish footballer

Personal information
- Full name: Jesús García Sanjuán
- Date of birth: 22 August 1971 (age 55)
- Place of birth: Zaragoza, Spain
- Height: 1.80 m (5 ft 11 in)
- Position: Midfielder

Youth career
- Zaragoza

Senior career*
Years	Team	Apps	(Gls)
1989–1991	Zaragoza B	31	(1)
1991–1998	Zaragoza	180	(5)
1997	→ Wolves (loan)	4	(0)
1998–1999	Villarreal	22	(0)
1999–2000	Córdoba	26	(0)
2000–2001	Airdrieonians	22	(5)
2001–2003	Kilmarnock	31	(0)
Total		316	(11)

International career
1989	Spain U18	5	(0)
1991	Spain U19	3	(0)
1992–1994	Spain U21	13	(0)
1991–1992	Spain U23	7	(1)
1998–2002	Aragon	2	(1)
Medal record
Men's football
Representing Spain
UEFA European Under-21 Championship
Bronze medal – third place	1994 France
- * Club domestic league appearances and goals

Jesús García Sanjuán (born 22 August 1971) is a Spanish former professional footballer who played mostly as a central midfielder.

Best known for his spell with Real Zaragoza, he helped it win the 1995 Cup Winners' Cup, then finished his professional career in Scotland where he represented two clubs.

== Club career ==
=== Zaragoza ===
A youth product of Real Zaragoza, Sanjuán was born in Zaragoza, and made his debut for the first team on 24 April 1991 in a 0–1 away loss against Sporting de Gijón. Almost never an undisputed starter for the Aragonese, he featured heavily during his seven-and-a-half professional seasons with the club, most notably amassing totals of 93 games and four goals in La Liga from 1991 to 1994.

The peak of Sanjuán's time with Zaragoza was winning the 1995 Cup Winners' Cup, in a 2–1 extra time win over Arsenal in Paris – he played 36 minutes in the final, as a substitute. The previous campaign, he had won the Copa del Rey with the side, beating Celta de Vigo on penalties and also featuring from the bench.

Sanjuán had a brief loan spell at English First Division team Wolverhampton Wanderers during autumn 1997, making four league appearances. He also featured three times in that season's Football League Cup, scoring the winning goal at Fulham.

Being definitely released by Zaragoza in June 1998, Sanjuán also played in Spain with Villarreal CF and Córdoba CF. With the former, he faced top level relegation after losing the play-offs to Sevilla FC.

=== Scotland ===
Sanjuán returned to the United Kingdom in 2000, with Scotland's Airdrieonians, as one of a series of Spanish players recruited by manager Steve Archibald. After eight months, amid spiralling financial problems, the club sold him to Kilmarnock where he played two Scottish Premier League seasons, now mostly in a sweeper position, before retiring in 2003; he scored his only goal for the latter in a 3–0 win over the former for the Scottish Cup, on 5 January 2002.

== Honours ==
Zaragoza

- Copa del Rey: 1993–94
- UEFA Cup Winners' Cup: 1994–95

Airdrieonians

- Scottish Challenge Cup: 2000–01

Spain U21

- UEFA European Under-21 Championship: Third Place 1994
