= Xavi Aguado =

Spanish footballer

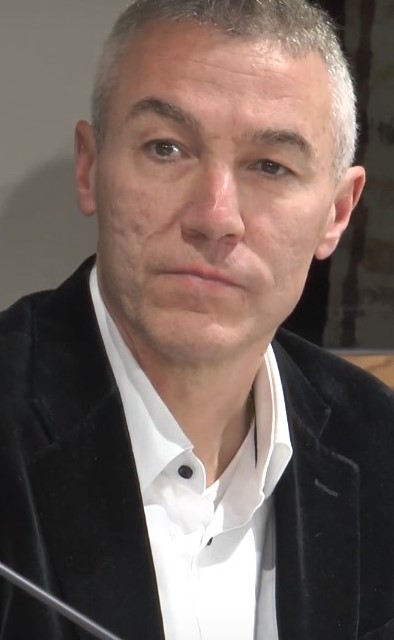
- Aguado in 2020

Personal information
- Full name: Xavier Aguado Companys
- Date of birth: 5 June 1968 (age 58)
- Place of birth: Badalona, Spain
- Height: 1.86 m (6 ft 1 in)
- Position: Centre-back

Youth career
- Badalona

Senior career*
Years	Team	Apps	(Gls)
1987–1988	Badalona		
1988–1990	Sabadell	50	(1)
1990–2003	Zaragoza	383	(22)
Total		433	(23)
- * Club domestic league appearances and goals

Xavier 'Xavi' Aguado Companys (born 5 June 1968) is a Spanish former professional footballer who played as a central defender. He is the father of footballer Marc Aguado.

He spent 13 years with Real Zaragoza – 12 in La Liga – appearing in nearly 500 official matches and winning three major titles.

== Club career ==
Born in Badalona, Barcelona, Catalonia, Aguado began playing as a senior with local club CF Badalona following a short spell in basketball. After two seasons at neighbours CE Sabadell FC in the Segunda División, he joined Real Zaragoza of La Liga for the 1990–91 campaign, quickly establishing as first choice whilst displaying aerial ability and leadership alike; he would be named captain early on.

Aguado was part of the Zaragoza team that beat Arsenal in the final of the 1994–95 UEFA Cup Winners' Cup. He was also on the winning side in the 2001 Copa del Rey Final, equalising an eventual 3–1 win over RC Celta de Vigo in Seville.

From 1997 to 1999, Aguado scored a total of nine league goals, including a brace in a 2–2 home draw against SD Compostela on 28 September 1997. However, during his 13-year career at the Aragonese, he also had a poor disciplinary record, collecting in the league alone 109 yellow cards and being sent off 18 times, the latter being an all-time worst in the competition until both he and Pablo Alfaro were surpassed by Sergio Ramos in 2017.

After Zaragoza's top-flight relegation in 2001–02, Aguado retired from professional football (he was still with the squad the following season, but made no appearances whatsoever) after 473 competitive games with the same club.

== Honours ==
Zaragoza

- Copa del Rey: 1993–94, 2000–01
- UEFA Cup Winners' Cup: 1994–95
