= Nayim =

Spanish footballer (born 1966)

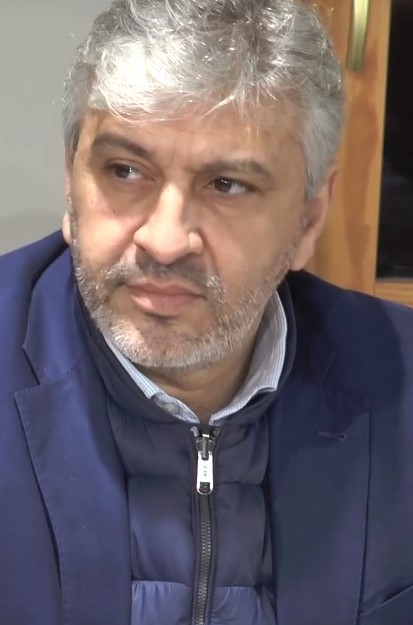
- Nayim in 2020

Personal information
- Full name: Mohamed Alí Amar
- Date of birth: 5 November 1966 (age 59)
- Place of birth: Ceuta, Spain
- Height: 1.77 m (5 ft 10 in)
- Position: Central midfielder

Youth career
- Ceuta
- 1979–1985: Barcelona

Senior career*
| Years | Team | Apps | (Gls) |
| 1984–1985 | Barcelona C | 27 | (9) |
| 1985–1987 | Barcelona B | 46 | (7) |
| 1987–1988 | Barcelona | 7 | (0) |
| 1988–1993 | Tottenham Hotspur | 112 | (11) |
| 1993–1997 | Zaragoza | 123 | (5) |
| 1997–2000 | Logroñés | 67 | (5) |
| Total | | 382 | (37) |

International career
| 1984–1985 | Spain U18 | 4 | (0) |
| 1985 | Spain U19 | 1 | (0) |
| 1985 | Spain U20 | 4 | (0) |
| 1987 | Spain U21 | 1 | (0) |

Managerial career
- 2006: Atlético Ceuta
- * Club domestic league appearances and goals

Mohamed Alí Amar (born 5 November 1966), known as Nayim, is a Spanish former professional footballer who played as a central midfielder.

He scored a last-minute goal for Real Zaragoza in the 1995 UEFA Cup Winners' Cup Final against Arsenal, with a lob from the half way line in the final minute of extra time. Over eight seasons in La Liga, he appeared in 130 matches and scored five goals.

He started his professional career with Barcelona and also represented Tottenham for five years, making over 100 league appearances.

== Club career ==
=== Barcelona and Tottenham ===
At the age of 12, Nayim left his hometown of Ceuta and joined FC Barcelona's youth academy La Masia. He broke into the first team under Terry Venables, but had very few opportunities due to 18 months of injuries. The same manager took him to Tottenham Hotspur in November 1988 originally on loan, making him the first Spaniard to play in English football since the Basque child refugee Emilio Aldecoa in 1947. Having initially spent several weeks waiting for a work permit, he signed the following year for £400,000 as part of the deal that took Gary Lineker in the same direction; his first goal for the club came in a 2–0 away win against Southampton, and he also found the net in Spurs' 3–0 home victory over West Ham United.

On 25 October 1989, Nayim scored a free kick in a 3–0 win away to Manchester United, which put pressure on their manager Alex Ferguson. He made a total of 23 appearances in 1989–90, helping Tottenham to a third-place finish. The League Cup offered him his first experience of English cup competition, playing four games en route to the quarter-finals and scoring three times.

The following season proved to be Nayim's most successful in English football. Although the team finished tenth, he appeared in 33 league matches and netted five times; his path to a Wembley final was again halted at the League Cup semi-final but, in the FA Cup, they overcame Nottingham Forest 2–1 in the final, with the player replacing injured Paul Gascoigne early in the game and setting up both goals to bring success to White Hart Lane. In a pre-match interview, he was praised by Bill Nicholson, Tottenham's double-winning manager of 1961.

Nayim took part in 31 league games in 1991–92, adding six in the League Cup campaign, including both legs of the semi-final loss to Nottingham Forest. The following season, he won the Goal of the Month competition for October with a volley against Liverpool; he added a hat-trick in the FA Cup quarter-final at Manchester City, helping his team to a 4–2 win. Spain national team manager Javier Clemente made a rare foreign trip to monitor him, but he never earned a cap.

During his time in England, Nayim was accused by the press of diving; a feign against Oxford United earned a rebuke from the usually reserved television commentator Trevor Brooking. He was dissuaded from continuing to simulate by Venables, who told him that the practice was reviled in England.

=== Zaragoza ===
In May 1993, Nayim signed for Real Zaragoza for £500,000. His most notable moment in football came in the final seconds of extra time in the 1995 UEFA Cup Winners' Cup Final by lobbing David Seaman from 45 yards to score a last-minute goal and win it 2–1 against Arsenal; nearly two decades later, he told UEFA's website that the strike was premeditated as his experience in England had taught him that the Gunners played a high defensive line.

=== Later years ===
Nayim retired in 2000, after a stint with Spanish Segunda División side CD Logroñés. He took up coaching afterwards, managing Atlético Ceuta and serving as assistant to AD Ceuta; in late 2009, he joined former Zaragoza teammate José Aurelio Gay's coaching staff, being named his assistant manager after Marcelino García Toral's sacking.

Nayim returned to his hometown in May 2016, to become sporting director at AD Ceuta FC.

== Personal life ==
Nayim is of Moroccan descent. He is also a practicing Muslim and was the only player of his faith to appear in the inaugural Premier League season. The eldest of his three children, Youssef, pursued a football career in the same position.

In 2006, the Aragonese village of Trasmoz named a street 'Gol de Nayim' ('Nayim's Goal').

== Honours ==
Tottenham

- FA Cup: 1990–91
- FA Charity Shield: 1991 (shared)

Zaragoza

- Copa del Rey: 1993–94
- UEFA Cup Winners' Cup: 1994–95

Spain U20

- FIFA World Youth Championship runner-up: 1985
