= 1993–94 Copa del Rey =

92nd Copa del Rey

Tournament details
- Country: Spain
- Teams: 160

Final positions
- Champions: Real Zaragoza
- Runners-up: Celta Vigo

Tournament statistics
- Matches played: 143
- Goals scored: 399 (2.79 per match)
- Top goal scorer(s): Vladimir Gudelj; Coca (7 each)

The 1993–94 Copa del Rey was the 92nd staging of the Copa del Rey.

The competition started on 15 August 1993 and concluded on 20 April 1994 with the final, held at the Vicente Calderón Stadium in Madrid.

== First round ==
First round
Home 1st leg	Agg.	Home 2nd leg	1st leg			2nd leg			Notes
Órdenes CF (Galicia (Spain))	0–1	(Galicia (Spain)) Racing de Ferrol	15 August 1993	0–1		22 August 1993	0–0		
Viveiro CF (Galicia (Spain))	1–2	(Galicia (Spain)) CD Lugo	15 August 1993	1–1		18 August 1993	1–0		
Juventud Cambados (Galicia (Spain))	0–5	(Galicia (Spain)) Arosa SC	15 August 1993	0–1		22 August 1993	4–0		
Sestao SC (Basque Country (autonomous community))	3–1	(Basque Country (autonomous community)) Bermeo CF	18 August 1993	1–1		22 August 1993	0–2		
CD Tudelano (Navarre)	1–3	(Navarre) CD Izarra	18 August 1993	0–2		22 August 1993	1–1		
SD Lemona (Basque Country (autonomous community))	2–2 (p)	(Basque Country (autonomous community)) CD Baskonia	18 August 1993	2–0		22 August 1993	2–0		Penalties: X–X for SD Lemona.
CD Carballiño (Galicia (Spain))	1–7	(Galicia (Spain)) CD Ourense	18 August 1993	0–3		22 August 1993	4–1		
CD Tropezón (Cantabria)	0–7	(Cantabria) Gimnástica de Torrelavega	18 August 1993	0–5		22 August 1993	2–0		
Polideportivo Ejido (Andalusia)	4–2	(Andalusia) CD Estepona	18 August 1993	1–1		22 August 1993	1–3		
CA Cortegana (Andalusia)	2–4	(Andalusia) Córdoba CF	18 August 1993	2–0		22 August 1993	4–0		
SD Hullera Vasco-Leonesa (Castile and León)	0–6	(Castile and León) UD Salamanca	18 August 1993	0–1		22 August 1993	5–0		
RCD Ribert (Castile and León)	1–6	(Castile and León) Real Ávila CF	18 August 1993	0–2		22 August 1993	4–1		
Lliria CF (Valencian Community)	0–2	(Valencian Community) Levante UD	18 August 1993	0–1		22 August 1993	1–0		
Deportivo Alavés (Basque Country (autonomous community))	5–0	(Basque Country (autonomous community)) Barakaldo CF	18 August 1993	3–0		22 August 1993	0–2		
CE Júpiter (Catalonia)	2–6	(Catalonia) AEC Manlleu	18 August 1993	0–1	Rep.	22 August 1993	5–2	Rep.	AEC Manlleu eliminated by improper alignment.
Girona FC (Catalonia)	1–3	FC Andorra	18 August 1993	1–1	Rep.	22 August 1993	2–0		
CE Sabadell FC (Catalonia)	1–2	(Catalonia) UE Figueres	18 August 1993	1–1	Rep.	22 August 1993	1–0		
CE Premià (Catalonia)	4–1	(Catalonia) Gimnàstic de Tarragona	18 August 1993	1–0	Rep.	22 August 1993	1–3	Rep.	
Villalonga FC (Galicia (Spain))	3–4	(Galicia (Spain)) Pontevedra CF	18 August 1993	1–2		22 August 1993	2–2		
CD Lealtad (Asturias)	3–2	(Asturias) Santiago de Aller CF	18 August 1993	1–0		22 August 1993	2–2		
Marina de Cudeyo CF (Cantabria)	0–1	(Cantabria) CD Comillas	18 August 1993	0–0		22 August 1993	1–0		
Club Hispano de Castrillón (Asturias)	2–3	(Asturias) Real Avilés Industrial	18 August 1993	1–0		22 August 1993	3–1		
Caudal Deportivo (Asturias)	3–4	(Asturias) UP Langreo	18 August 1993	2–1		22 August 1993	3–1		
Roldán AD (Region of Murcia)	3–2	(Region of Murcia) CD Beniel	18 August 1993	1–0		22 August 1993	2–2		
UDA Gramenet (Catalonia)	4–2	(Catalonia) UE Sant Andreu	18 August 1993	1–1	Rep.	22 August 1993	1–3	Rep.	
Real Aranjuez CF (Community of Madrid)	1–6	(Community of Madrid) Getafe CF	18 August 1993	0–2		22 August 1993	4–1		
Pinoso CF (Valencian Community)	2–2 (a)	(Valencian Community) Benidorm CD	18 August 1993	1–2		22 August 1993	0–1		Mistakenly played an extra time (1-1), that the RFEF declared invalid.
Crevillente Deportivo (Valencian Community)	10–2	(Valencian Community) UD Horadada	18 August 1993	6–0		22 August 1993	2–4		
CD San Fernando (Andalusia)	4–5	(Andalusia) Écija Balompié	18 August 1993	1–3		22 August 1993	2–3		
Atlético Malagueño (Andalusia)	2–4	(Andalusia) Almería CF	18 August 1993	2–0		22 August 1993	4–0		
CP Cacereño (Extremadura)	3–3 (a)	CF Extremadura	18 August 1993	0–1		22 August 1993	2–3		
Caravaca CF (Region of Murcia)	2–1	(Region of Murcia) CD Cieza	18 August 1993	2–0		22 August 1993	1–0		
CF Lorca Promesas (Region of Murcia)	1–6	(Region of Murcia) Yeclano CF	18 August 1993	0–4		22 August 1993	2–1		
Guadix CF (Andalusia)	2–4	(Andalusia) CD Mármol Macael	18 August 1993	2–0		22 August 1993	4–0		
Calpe CF (Valencian Community)	1–9	(Valencian Community) CD Alcoyano	18 August 1993	1–1		22 August 1993	8–0		
Zamora CF (Castile and León)	2–2 (p)	(Castile and León) SD Ponferradina	18 August 1993	2–0		22 August 1993	2–0		Penalties: X–X for SD Ponferrada.
SD Ibiza (Balearic Islands)	0–5	(Balearic Islands) Santa Eulàlia	18 August 1993	0–2		22 August 1993	3–0		
CF Gimnástico Alcázar (Castilla–La Mancha)	0–6	(Castilla–La Mancha) CA Tomelloso	18 August 1993	0–3		22 August 1993	3–0		
Real Balompédica Linense (Andalusia)	1–3	(Andalusia) CD San Roque	18 August 1993	1–2		22 August 1993	1–0		
UD Los Palacios (Andalusia)	3–5	(Andalusia) CD Mairena	18 August 1993	0–3		22 August 1993	2–3		
Real Jaén CF (Andalusia)	1–2	(Andalusia) Granada CF	18 August 1993	0–1		22 August 1993	1–1		
Atlético Sanluqueño CF (Andalusia)	3–8	(Andalusia) Xerez CD	18 August 1993	2–4		22 August 1993	4–1		
AD Mar Menor (Castilla–La Mancha)	2–1	(Castilla–La Mancha) Cartagena FC	18 August 1993	0–1		22 August 1993	0–2		
Endesa Andorra (Aragon)	6–5	(Castile and León) CD Numancia	18 August 1993	5–5		22 August 1993	0–1		
UD Telde (Canary Islands)	3–9	(Canary Islands) CD Corralejo	18 August 1993	1–3		23 August 1993	6–2		
Orihuela Deportiva CF (Valencian Community)	1–3	(Valencian Community) Elche CF	19 August 1993	1–0		22 August 1993	3–0		
Polideportivo Almería (Andalusia)	2–5	(Andalusia) UD Melilla	19 August 1993	1–3		23 August 1993	2–1		
Estrella CF (Canary Islands)	0–4	(Canary Islands) UD Las Palmas	20 August 1993	0–1		22 August 1993	3–0		
UD Orotava (Canary Islands)	4–6	(Canary Islands) UD Realejos	21 August 1993	3–4		23 August 1993	2–1		
Bye: SD Beasain; their opponents, CD Elgóibar, withdrew from the competition.
Bye: Manzanares CF; their opponents, CD Valdepeñas, sanctioned by the federation.
Bye by draw: CD Endesa As Pontes, UM Escobedo, Cultural Leonesa, CF Palencia, Recreativo de Huelva, Atlético Bembibre, CD Talavera, Club Siero, UE Rubí, CD Roquetas, CD Maspalomas, CD Mensajero.

== Second round ==
Second round
Home 1st leg	Agg.	Home 2nd leg	1st leg			2nd leg			Notes
CD Endesa As Pontes (Galicia (Spain))	0–4	(Galicia (Spain)) Racing de Ferrol	25 August 1993	0–4		29 August 1993	0–0		
Arosa SC (Galicia (Spain))	5–1	(Galicia (Spain)) Pontevedra CF	25 August 1993	4–1		29 August 1993	0–1		
CD Lugo (Galicia (Spain))	5–2	(Galicia (Spain)) CD Ourense	25 August 1993	2–1		29 August 1993	1–3		
CD Lealtad (Asturias)	2–3	(Asturias) Real Avilés Industrial	25 August 1993	2–1		3 September 1993	2–0		Match (1st leg) suspended due to heavy rain after 32 minutes.
UM Escobedo (Cantabria)	5–3	(Cantabria) CD Comillas	25 August 1993	4–1		29 August 1993	2–1		
SD Beasain (Basque Country (autonomous community))	0–1	(Basque Country (autonomous community)) SD Lemona	25 August 1993	0–0		29 August 1993	1–0		
Cultural Leonesa (Castile and León)	3–1	(Castile and León) CF Palencia	25 August 1993	1–0		29 August 1993	1–2		
Deportivo Alavés (Basque Country (autonomous community))	1–0	(Basque Country (autonomous community)) Sestao SC	25 August 1993	1–0		29 August 1993	0–0		
FC Andorra	3–5	(Catalonia) UE Figueres	25 August 1993	2–1	Rep.	29 August 1993	4–1	Rep.	
CD San Roque (Andalusia)	3–3 (p)	(Andalusia) Recreativo de Huelva	25 August 1993	2–1		29 August 1993	2–1		Penalties: X–X for Recreativo de Huelva
CD Mairena (Andalusia)	1–3	(Andalusia) Écija Balompié	25 August 1993	1–2		29 August 1993	1–0		
Córdoba CF (Andalusia)	2–0	(Andalusia) Xerez CD	25 August 1993	0–0		29 August 1993	0–2		
CE Premià (Catalonia)	1–3	(Catalonia) UDA Gramenet	25 August 1993	1–2	Rep.	29 August 1993	1–0	Rep.	
Benidorm CD (Valencian Community)	1–3	(Valencian Community) Levante UD	25 August 1993	1–2		29 August 1993	1–0		
Roldán AD (Region of Murcia)	0–7	(Region of Murcia) Yeclano CF	25 August 1993	0–4		29 August 1993	3–0		
AD Mar Menor (Region of Murcia)	2–3	(Region of Murcia) Caravaca CF	25 August 1993	2–1		29 August 1993	2–0		
CA Bembibre (Castile and León)	1–2	(Castile and León) SD Ponferradina	25 August 1993	1–2		29 August 1993	0–0		
Manzanares CF (Castilla–La Mancha)	1–3	(Castilla–La Mancha) CD Talavera	25 August 1993	1–1		29 August 1993	2–0		
Real Ávila CF (Castile and León)	0–5	(Castile and León) UD Salamanca	25 August 1993	0–1		29 August 1993	4–0		
UD Realejos (Canary Islands)	3–6	(Canary Islands) CD Mensajero	25 August 1993	2–1		29 August 1993	5–1		
Club Siero (Asturias)	5–7	(Asturias) UP Langreo	26 August 1993	4–2		30 August 1993	5–1	Rep.	
UD Melilla (Andalusia)	5–6	(Andalusia) CD Mármol Macael	26 August 1993	1–3		29 August 1993	3–4		
CE Júpiter (Catalonia)	3–4	(Catalonia) UE Rubí	26 August 1993	2–0	Rep.	29 August 1993	4–1	Rep.	
Crevillente Deportivo (Valencian Community)	0–2	(Valencian Community) CD Alcoyano	26 August 1993	0–1		29 August 1993	1–0		
CD Roquetas (Andalusia)	0–5	(Andalusia) Polideportivo Ejido	26 August 1993	0–2		29 August 1993	3–0		
Granada CF (Andalusia)	0–1	(Andalusia) Almería CF	26 August 1993	0–1		30 August 1993	0–0		
CD Maspalomas (Canary Islands)	2–10	(Canary Islands) UD Las Palmas	27 August 1993	0–7		29 August 1993	3–2		
Bye: CD Corralejo, CD Izarra, Getafe CF, Santa Eulàlia, CA Tomelloso, CP Cacereño, Elche CF, Gimnástica de Torrelavega, Endesa Andorra.

== Third round ==
Third round
Home 1st leg	Agg.	Home 2nd leg	1st leg			2nd leg			Notes
CD Izarra (Navarre)	2–8	(Aragon) Real Zaragoza	29 August 1993	2–1	Rep.	16 September 1993	7–0	Rep.	
CD Alcoyano (Valencian Community)	3–8	(Castilla–La Mancha) CD Toledo	1 September 1993	2–2		15 September 1993	6–1	Rep.	
Endesa Andorra (Aragon)	1–6	(La Rioja) CD Logroñés	1 September 1993	0–3	Rep.	15 September 1993	3–1	Rep.	
UD Las Palmas (Canary Islands)	3–4	(Basque Country (autonomous community)) Athletic Bilbao	1 September 1993	2–2	Rep.	15 September 1993	2–1	Rep.	
Córdoba CF (Andalusia)	3–5	(Valencian Community) Hércules CF	1 September 1993	1–2		16 September 1993	3–2		
Racing de Ferrol (Galicia (Spain))	1–3	(Region of Murcia) Yeclano CF	1 September 1993	0–1		22 September 1993	2–1	Rep.	
Gimnástica de Torrelavega (Cantabria)	1–5	(Basque Country (autonomous community)) SD Eibar	2 September 1993	1–4		16 September 1993	1–0		
UP Langreo (Asturias)	3–3 (a)	(Catalonia) Palamós CF	2 September 1993	2–2	Rep.	15 September 1993	1–1	Rep.	
Elche CF (Valencian Community)	4–4 (aet-a)	(Castile and León) Real Burgos CF	2 September 1993	2–1		16 September 1993	3–2	Rep.	
Santa Eulàlia (Balearic Islands)	0–10	(Extremadura) CD Badajoz	2 September 1993	0–3		8 September 1993	7–0	Rep.	
UDA Gramenet (Catalonia)	1–2 (aet)	(Galicia (Spain)) Celta de Vigo	2 September 1993	1–0	Rep.	16 September 1993	2–0	Rep.	
Deportivo Alavés (Basque Country (autonomous community))	0–5	(Region of Murcia) Real Murcia CF	2 September 1993	0–2	Rep.	16 September 1993	3–0	Rep.	
Polideportivo Ejido (Andalusia)	4–2	(Community of Madrid) CD Leganés	2 September 1993	2–1		16 September 1993	1–2		
UE Figueres (Catalonia)	1–5	(Basque Country (autonomous community)) Real Sociedad	2 September 1993	1–1	Rep.	15 September 1993	4–0	Rep.	
UM Escobedo (Cantabria)	0–3	(Catalonia) UE Lleida	2 September 1993	0–0	Rep.	15 September 1993	3–0	Rep.	
Caravaca CF (Region of Murcia)	0–6	(Catalonia) RCD Espanyol	2 September 1993	0–3	Rep.	16 September 1993	3–0	Rep.	
CA Tomelloso (Castilla–La Mancha)	0–1 (aet)	(Andalusia) Cádiz CF	2 September 1993	0–0		16 September 1993	1–0	Rep.	
CP Cacereño (Extremadura)	2–4	(Andalusia) Sevilla FC	2 September 1993	0–3		22 September 1993	1–2	Rep.	
Arosa SC (Galicia (Spain))	0–1	(Valencian Community) Villarreal CF	2 September 1993	0–1		16 September 1993	0–0	Rep.	
Recreativo de Huelva (Andalusia)	1–6	(Asturias) Real Oviedo CF	2 September 1993	1–2		14 September 1993	4–0	Rep.	
Levante UD (Valencian Community)	1–2	(Castile and León) Real Valladolid CF	7 September 1993	0–0	Rep.	22 September 1993	2–1	Rep.	
SD Ponferradina (Castile and León)	1–6	(Navarre) CA Osasuna	7 September 1993	1–2	Rep.	14 September 1993	4–0	Rep.	
CD Talavera (Castilla–La Mancha)	5–2	(Andalusia) CA Marbella	7 September 1993	3–1	Rep.	16 September 1993	1–2	Rep.	
Getafe CF (Community of Madrid)	4–1	(Asturias) Real Avilés Industrial	7 September 1993	2–1	Rep.	16 September 1993	0–2		
CD Mármol Macael (Andalusia)	3–6	(Cantabria) Racing de Santander	8 September 1993	2–2	Rep.	15 September 1993	4–1	Rep.	
Cultural Leonesa (Castile and León)	4–7	(Asturias) Sporting de Gijón	8 September 1993	3–2	Rep.	14 September 1993	5–1	Rep.	
UD Salamanca (Castile and León)	4–1	(Balearic Islands) RCD Mallorca	8 September 1993	3–1	Rep.	22 September 1993	0–1	Rep.	
SD Lemona (Basque Country (autonomous community))	1–3	(Andalusia) Almería CF	8 September 1993	1–0	Rep.	22 September 1993	3–0	Rep.	
CD Lugo (Galicia (Spain))	1–2	(Galicia (Spain)) SD Compostela	9 September 1993	1–0	Rep.	21 September 1993	2–0	Rep.	
Écija Balompié (Andalusia)	4–2	(Valencian Community) CD Castellón	9 September 1993	1–1	Rep.	15 September 1993	3–1	Rep.	
UE Rubí (Catalonia)	0–5	(Extremadura) CP Mérida	16 September 1993	0–2	Rep.	23 September 1993	3–0	Rep.	
CD Corralejo (Canary Islands)	3–7	(Community of Madrid) Rayo Vallecano	16 September 1993	3–3	Rep.	23 September 1993	4–0	Rep.	
CD Mensajero (Canary Islands)	2–3	(Andalusia) Real Betis	21 September 1993	0–0	Rep.	20 October 1993	3–2		
Bye: Albacete Balompié.

== Fourth round ==
Fourth round
Home 1st leg	Agg.	Home 2nd leg	1st leg			2nd leg			Notes
SD Compostela (Galicia (Spain))	2–6	(Catalonia) UE Lleida	10 October 1993	1–2	Rep.	2 November 1993	4–1	Rep.	
CP Mérida (Extremadura)	2–1	(Community of Madrid) Rayo Vallecano	12 October 1993	1–0		14 November 1993	1–1	Rep.	
Almería CF (Andalusia)	1–7	(Catalonia) RCD Espanyol	21 October 1993	0–2	Rep.	3 November 1993	5–1	Rep.	
Cádiz CF (Andalusia)	0–6	(Asturias) Real Oviedo CF	26 October 1993	0–2	Rep.	13 November 1993	4–0	Rep.	
Athletic Bilbao (Basque Country (autonomous community))	1–3	(Aragon) Real Zaragoza	27 October 1993	0–2	Rep.	4 November 1993	1–1	Rep.	
CD Talavera (Castilla–La Mancha)	4–3	(Cantabria) Racing de Santander	27 October 1993	2–0	Rep.	3 November 1993	3–2	Rep.	
Palamós CF (Catalonia)	0–1	(Castilla–La Mancha) CD Toledo	27 October 1993	0–0	Rep.	3 November 1993	1–0	Rep.	
Elche CF (Valencian Community)	2–6	(Andalusia) Real Betis	27 October 1993	2–1	Rep.	4 November 1993	5–0	Rep.	
Real Murcia CF (Region of Murcia)	1–6	(Castile and León) Real Valladolid CF	27 October 1993	0–3	Rep.	14 November 1993	3–1	Rep.	
Hércules CF (Valencian Community)	1–1 (a)	(Basque Country (autonomous community)) Real Sociedad	27 October 1993	1–1	Rep.	3 November 1993	0–0	Rep.	
Celta Vigo (Galicia (Spain))	5–4	(Castilla–La Mancha) Albacete	27 October 1993	4–0	Rep.	4 November 1993	4–1	Rep.	
Polideportivo Ejido (Andalusia)	4–4 (aet-a)	(Castile and León) Salamanca	27 October 1993	3–0		4 November 1993	4–1	Rep.	
Getafe (Community of Madrid)	1–3	(La Rioja) Logroñés	27 October 1993	0–1	Rep.	4 November 1993	2–1	Rep.	
Castellón (Valencian Community)	2–3 (aet)	(Andalusia) Sevilla	16 November 1993	2–0	Rep.	24 November 1993	3–0	Rep.	(*)
(*) Match (1st leg) suspended due to heavy rain.
Bye: Osasuna, Badajoz, Sporting de Gijón, Eibar, Villarreal, Yeclano.

== Fifth round ==
Fifth round
Home 1st leg	Agg.	Home 2nd leg	1st leg			2nd leg			Notes
Zaragoza (Aragon)	2–1	(Navarre) Osasuna	1 December 1993	1–0	Rep.	15 December 1993	1–1	Rep.	
Logroñés (La Rioja)	3–1	(Catalonia) Lleida	1 December 1993	3–1	Rep.	15 December 1993	0–0	Rep.	
Yeclano (Region of Murcia)	1–2 (aet)	(Extremadura) Badajoz	1 December 1993	1–0	Rep.	15 December 1993	2–0	Rep.	
Espanyol (Catalonia)	3–2	(Valencian Community) Villarreal	1 December 1993	2–0	Rep.	15 December 1993	2–1	Rep.	
Real Sociedad (Basque Country (autonomous community))	3–4	(Andalusia) Sevilla	2 December 1993	3–3	Rep.	15 December 1993	1–0	Rep.	
Sporting de Gijón (Asturias)	3–2	(Castile and León) Valladolid	8 December 1993	3–1	Rep.	22 December 1993	1–0	Rep.	
Toledo (Castilla–La Mancha)	2–3	(Asturias) Real Oviedo	8 December 1993	1–1	Rep.	15 December 1993	2–1	Rep.	
CD Talavera (Castilla–La Mancha)	1–2	(Galicia (Spain)) Celta Vigo	8 December 1993	1–2	Rep.	21 December 1993	0–0	Rep.	
Mérida (Extremadura)	1–0	(Basque Country (autonomous community)) Eibar	8 December 1993	0–0	Rep.	15 December 1993	0–1	Rep.	
Polideportivo Ejido (Andalusia)	2–5	(Andalusia) Betis	8 December 1993	1–3	Rep.	14 December 1993	2–1	Rep.	

== Bracket ==
First round
1	(Galicia (Spain)) Deportivo La Coruña	1	1	2
16	(Asturias) Real Oviedo	3	0	3
8	(La Rioja) Logroñés	1	0	1
9	(Galicia (Spain)) Celta Vigo (5–4 p)	0	1	1
5	(Canary Islands) Tenerife	3	2	5
12	(Valencian Community) Valencia	1	3	4
4	(Community of Madrid) Real Madrid	2	3	5
13	(Community of Madrid) Atlético Madrid	2	2	4
6	(Andalusia) Betis	3	1	4
11	(Extremadura) Mérida	1	1	2
3	(Asturias) Sporting de Gijón	0	1	1
14	(Catalonia) Barcelona	3	1	4
7	(Extremadura) Badajoz	1	0	1
10	(Aragon) Zaragoza	0	3	3
2	(Catalonia) Espanyol	0	2	2
15	(Andalusia) Sevilla	1	2	3

Quarter-finals
(Asturias) Real Oviedo	1	0	1
(Galicia (Spain)) Celta Vigo	0	5	5
(Canary Islands) Tenerife	2	3	5
(Community of Madrid) Real Madrid	1	0	1
(Andalusia) Betis	0	1	1
(Catalonia) Barcelona	0	0	0
(Aragon) Zaragoza	2	1	3
(Andalusia) Sevilla	1	1	2

Semi-finals
(Galicia (Spain)) Celta Vigo	3	2	5
(Canary Islands) Tenerife	0	2	2
(Andalusia) Betis	0	1	1
(Aragon) Zaragoza (aet)	1	3	4

Final
(Galicia (Spain)) Celta Vigo	0
(Aragon) Zaragoza (5–4 p)	0

== Round of 16 ==
Team 1	Agg.	Team 2	1st leg	2nd leg
Deportivo La Coruña (Galicia (Spain))	2–3	(Asturias) Real Oviedo	1–3	1-0
Logroñés (La Rioja)	1–1 (4–5 p)	(Galicia (Spain)) Celta de Vigo	1–0	0-1
Tenerife (Canary Islands)	5–4	(Valencian Community) Valencia	3–1	2-3
Real Madrid (Community of Madrid)	5–4	(Community of Madrid) Atlético Madrid	2–2	3-2
Betis (Andalusia)	4–2	(Extremadura) Mérida	3–1	1–1
Sporting de Gijón (Asturias)	1–4	(Catalonia) Barcelona	0–3	1–1
Badajoz (Extremadura)	1–3	(Aragon) Zaragoza	1–0	0-3
Espanyol (Catalonia)	2–3	(Andalusia) Sevilla	0–1	2–2

=== First leg ===
4 January 1994	Sporting de Gijón	0–3	Barcelona	Gijón
20:30 CET		Report (in Spanish)	Amor 2'; Sergi 8'; Julio Salinas 28'	Stadium: El Molinón; Attendance: 22,000; Referee: Brito Arceo (Canary Islands)

4 January 1994	Real Madrid	2–2	Atlético Madrid	Madrid
21:00 CET	Zamorano 10'; Míchel 82' (pen.)	Report (in Spanish)	Caminero 34', 53'	Stadium: Santiago Bernabéu; Attendance: 80,000; Referee: Fernández Marín (Valencian Community)

5 January 1994	Deportivo La Coruña	1–3	Real Oviedo	A Coruña
20:30 CET	Donato 90+1'	Report (in Spanish)	Armando 24'; Janković 26'; Rivas 42'	Stadium: Riazor; Attendance: 4,000; Referee: Urio Velázquez (Basque Country (autonomous community))

5 January 1994	Espanyol	0–1	Sevilla	Barcelona
20:45 CET		Report (in Spanish)	Simeone 65'	Stadium: Sarrià; Attendance: 12,000; Referee: Rubio Valdivieso (Castile and León)

5 January 1994	Logroñés	1–0	Celta Vigo	Logroño
21:00 CET	Paco 45'	Report (in Spanish)		Stadium: Las Gaunas; Attendance: — Referee: Rivas Fernández (Castile and León)

5 January 1994	Tenerife	3–1	Valencia	Santa Cruz de Tenerife
22:00 CET	Chano 20', 41'; Latorre 90+1'	Report (in Spanish)	Mijatović 45+1'	Stadium: Heliodoro Rodríguez López; Attendance: — Referee: Díaz Vega (Asturias)

6 January 1994	Real Betis	3–1	Mérida	Sevilla
17:00 CET	Cuéllar 24'; Olías 46'; Aquino 81'	Report (in Spanish)	José María 55'	Stadium: Benito Villamarín; Attendance: — Referee: Rodríguez Martel (Canary Islands)

6 January 1994	Badajoz	1–0	Real Zaragoza	Badajoz
17:00 CET	Altimira 38'	Report (in Spanish)		Stadium: El Vivero; Attendance: — Referee: Nuñez Manrique (Community of Madrid)

=== Second leg ===
12 January 1994	Real Oviedo	0–1	Deportivo La Coruña	Oviedo
20:15 CET		Report (in Spanish)	Pedro Riesco 42'	Stadium: Carlos Tartiere; Attendance: 10,000; Referee: García-Aranda (Community of Madrid)

12 January 1994	Barcelona	1–1	Sporting de Gijón	Barcelona
20:45 CET	Salinas 3'	Report (in Spanish)	Ablanedo I 11'	Stadium: Camp Nou; Attendance: 30,000; Referee: Merino González (Canary Islands)

12 January 1994	Real Zaragoza	3–0	Badajoz	Zaragoza
20:45 CET	Aragón 27' (pen.); Pardeza 34', 88'	Report (in Spanish)		Stadium: La Romareda; Attendance: — Referee: Gómez López (Region of Murcia)

12 January 1994	Valencia	3–2	Tenerife	Valencia
21:00 CET	Gálvez 6'; Penev 43'; Serer 85'	Report (in Spanish)	Chano 54', 88'	Stadium: Luis Casanova; Attendance: — Referee: Garcia de Loza (Galicia (Spain))

12 January 1994	Sevilla	2–2	Espanyol	Seville
21:00 CET	Šuker 26' (pen.); Simeone 47'	Report (in Spanish)	Francisco 15'; Fonseca 69'	Stadium: Ramón Sánchez Pizjuán; Attendance: 7,000; Referee: Pajares Paz (Extremadura)

12 January 1994	Mérida	1–1	Real Betis	Mérida
21:00 CET	Salguero 76'	Report (in Spanish)	Aquino 63'	Stadium: Romano José Fouto; Attendance: — Referee: Carcelén García (Community of Madrid)

12 January 1994	Celta Vigo	1–0 (a.e.t.) (4–3 p)	Logroñés	Vigo
21:00 CET	Gudelj 5'	Report (in Spanish)		Stadium: Balaídos; Attendance: — Referee: Esquinas Torres (Community of Madrid)
	Penalties
			Poyatos (penalty missed); Herrero (penalty missed)

13 January 1994	Atlético Madrid	2–3	Real Madrid	Madrid
21:30 CET	Juanito 42'; Pedro 80' (pen.)	Report (in Spanish)	Butragueño 40'; Luis Enrique 45+3'; Lasa 65'	Stadium: Vicente Calderón; Attendance: 50,000; Referee: López Nieto (Andalusia)

== Quarter-finals ==
Team 1	Agg.	Team 2	1st leg	2nd leg
Real Oviedo (Asturias)	1–5	(Galicia (Spain)) Celta de Vigo	1–0	0-5
CD Tenerife (Canary Islands)	5–1	(Community of Madrid) Real Madrid CF	2–1	3-0
Real Betis (Andalusia)	1–0	(Catalonia) FC Barcelona	0–0	1-0
Real Zaragoza (Aragon)	3–2	(Andalusia) Sevilla FC	2–1	1–1

=== First leg ===
25 January 1994	Tenerife	2–1	Real Madrid	Santa Cruz de Tenerife
22:00 CET	Latorre 29'; Dertycia 42'	Report (in Spanish)	Zamorano 55'	Stadium: Heliodoro Rodríguez López; Attendance: — Referee: Urio Velazquez (Basque Country (autonomous community))

26 January 1994	Real Oviedo	1–0	Celta Vigo	Oviedo
20:30 CET	Janković 30'	Report (in Spanish)		Stadium: Carlos Tartiere; Attendance: — Referee: Rubio Valdivieso (Castile and León)

26 January 1994	Real Zaragoza	2–1	Sevilla	Zaragoza
20:45 CET	Aragón 18' (pen.); Poyet 64'	Report (in Spanish)	Cortijo 87'	Stadium: La Romareda; Attendance: — Referee: Díaz Vega (Asturias)

26 January 1994	Real Betis	0–0	Barcelona	Sevilla
21:00 CET		Report (in Spanish)		Stadium: Benito Villamarín; Attendance: 25,000; Referee: García de Loza (Galicia (Spain))

=== Second leg ===
1 February 1994	Real Madrid	0–3	Tenerife	Madrid
21:00 CET		Report (in Spanish)	Aguilera 44'; Latorre 54', 79'	Stadium: Santiago Bernabéu; Attendance: 50,000; Referee: Martín Navarrete (Andalusia)

2 February 1994	Sevilla	1–1	Real Zaragoza	Sevilla
21:00 CET	Moya 35'	Report (in Spanish)	Poyet 85'	Stadium: Ramón Sánchez Pizjuán; Attendance: 35,000; Referee: García-Aranda (Community of Madrid)

2 February 1994	Celta Vigo	5–0	Real Oviedo	Vigo
21:00 CET	Salillas 1'; Salva 46'; Ratković 56'; Gudelj 78'; Carlos 87'	Report (in Spanish)		Stadium: Balaídos; Attendance: — Referee: Ansuátegui Roca (Valencian Community)

3 February 1994	Barcelona	0–1	Real Betis	Barcelona
21:00 CET		Report (in Spanish)	Juanito 29'	Stadium: Camp Nou; Attendance: 30,000; Referee: Brito Arceo (Canary Islands)

== Semi-finals ==
Team 1	Agg.	Team 2	1st leg	2nd leg
Celta de Vigo (Galicia (Spain))	5–2	(Canary Islands) CD Tenerife	3–0	2–2
Real Betis (Andalusia)	1–4 (aet)	(Aragon) Real Zaragoza	0–1	1–3

=== First leg ===
16 February 1994	Celta Vigo	3–0	Tenerife	Vigo
21:00 CET	Gudelj 17', 31'; Salillas 80'	Report (in Spanish)		Stadium: Balaídos; Attendance: — Referee: López Nieto (Andalusia)

17 February 1994	Real Betis	0–1	Real Zaragoza	Sevilla
21:30 CET		Report (in Spanish)	Aragón 32'	Stadium: Benito Villamarín; Attendance: — Referee: Ansuátegui Roca (Valencian Community)

=== Second leg ===
9 March 1994	Real Zaragoza	3–1 (a.e.t.)	Real Betis	Zaragoza
21:00 CET	Poyet 94'; Gay 97'; Moisés 110' (pen.)	Report (in Spanish)	Ríos 90+1'	Stadium: La Romareda; Attendance: 42,000; Referee: García-Aranda (Community of Madrid)

10 March 1994	Tenerife	2–2	Celta Vigo	Santa Cruz de Tenerife
22:00 CET	Aguilera 44'; Dertycia 61'	Report (in Spanish)	Gudelj 66', 73'	Stadium: Heliodoro Rodríguez López; Attendance: — Referee: Díaz Vega (Asturias)

== Final ==
20 April 1994
21:30 CET

Celta Vigo	0–0 (a.e.t.)	Real Zaragoza
	Report (in Spanish)	Aragón (yellow card) 90' (red card)
Penalties
Andrijašević (penalty scored); Gudelj (penalty scored); Dadíe (penalty scored); Losada (penalty scored); Alejo (penalty missed)	4–5	(penalty scored) Cáceres; (penalty scored) Nayim; (penalty scored) Franco; (penalty scored) Gay; (penalty scored) Higuera

Madrid
Stadium: Vicente Calderón
Attendance: 60,000
Referee: López Nieto (Andalusia)

Copa del Rey
1993–94 winners
Real Zaragoza
4th title

== Top goalscorers ==
Player	Goals	Team
(Spain) Coca	7	Corralejo
(Bosnia and Herzegovina) Vladimir Gudelj	7	Celta Vigo
(Spain) César Melo	6	Polideportivo Ejido
(Spain) Arturo	6	Las Palmas
(Spain) Luisito	6	Arosa
(Spain) Quico	6	Salamanca
