= Alberto Belsué =

Spanish footballer (born 1968)

Personal information
- Full name: Alberto Belsué Arias
- Date of birth: 2 March 1968 (age 58)
- Place of birth: Zaragoza, Spain
- Height: 1.71 m (5 ft 7 in)
- Position: Right-back

Youth career
- 1978–1986: Stadium Casablanca

Senior career*
Years	Team	Apps	(Gls)
1986–1988	Endesa Andorra	32	(1)
1988–1998	Zaragoza	277	(7)
1998–1999	Alavés	22	(0)
1999–2000	Numancia	20	(0)
2000–2001	Iraklis	7	(0)
Total		358	(8)

International career
1994–1996	Spain	17	(0)
- * Club domestic league appearances and goals

Alberto Belsué Arias (born 2 March 1968) is a Spanish former professional footballer who played as a right-back.

He amassed La Liga totals of 319 matches and seven goals over 12 seasons, representing in the competition Zaragoza, Alavés and Numancia and winning two titles with the first club.

== Club career ==
Belsué was born in Zaragoza, Aragon. After beginning with lowly Endesa de Andorra as a sweeper, he joined La Liga club Real Zaragoza, where he would make 345 competitive appearances, starting in the side's two major conquests in the decade: the 1994 Copa del Rey and the following year's UEFA Cup Winners' Cup.

Following stints with Deportivo Alavés and CD Numancia– in both cases barely avoiding top-flight relegation – Belsué retired after an abroad spell with Greece's Iraklis FC, aged 33.

== International career ==
A Spanish international for two years, Belsué made his debut on 16 November 1994 in a UEFA Euro 1996 qualifier 3–0 win against Denmark in Seville (90 minutes played). He appeared in two of the nation's four matches in the final stages in England, converting his attempt in the quarter-final penalty shootout loss to the hosts.

== Honours ==
Zaragoza

- Copa del Rey: 1993–94
- UEFA Cup Winners' Cup: 1994–95
