= Francisco Higuera =

Spanish former footballer (born 1965)

Personal information
- Full name: Francisco Higuera Fernández
- Date of birth: 30 January 1965 (age 61)
- Place of birth: Escurial, Spain
- Height: 1.72 m (5 ft 8 in)
- Position: Attacking midfielder

Youth career
- Mallorca

Senior career*
Years	Team	Apps	(Gls)
1982–1988	Mallorca	174	(27)
1988–1997	Zaragoza	276	(63)
1997–1998	Puebla	34	(7)
1998–2000	Xerez	53	(1)
Total		537	(98)

International career
1982	Spain U16	1	(0)
1983	Spain U18	3	(0)
1992–1995	Spain	6	(1)

Managerial career
- 2013–2014: Xerez
- * Club domestic league appearances and goals

Francisco Higuera Fernández (born 30 January 1965) is a Spanish former professional footballer who played mainly as an attacking midfielder and occasionally as a forward.

Nicknamed Paquete, he appeared in 367 La Liga games over 12 seasons (76 goals), in representation of Mallorca and Zaragoza.

== Club career ==
Higuera was born in Escurial, Province of Cáceres. After playing youth football with RCD Mallorca he made his senior debut at only 17, in a 3–0 Segunda División home win against Deportivo de La Coruña on 10 October 1982, and finished his first season with 16 matches and two goals as the Balearic Islands club promoted to La Liga. His first appearance in the top flight occurred on 24 September 1983 in a 3–0 loss at Atlético Madrid, and he went on to experience two relegations from that tier with the team.

In summer 1988, Higuera signed with Real Zaragoza, being ever-present for the Aragonese. In the 1993–94 campaign he scored a career-best 12 goals and converted the decisive penalty in the shootout victory over RC Celta de Vigo in the Copa del Rey final, later being instrumental in their 1995 conquest of the UEFA Cup Winners' Cup, often partnering Juan Esnáider, Miguel Pardeza and Gus Poyet in attack (they recorded, in 1994–95, an impressive 5–4 away defeat of FC Barcelona in the Supercopa de España).

Higuera decided to have an abroad experience in 1997 at the age of 32, and joined Mexico's Puebla FC, being accompanied by Pardeza in the adventure. He returned home after one season, signing with Xerez CD of Segunda División B and retiring in 2000.

After serving as general manager to the Andalusians for several seasons, Higuera switched to another modest club in 2009, Lorca Deportiva CF, also in that capacity.

== International career ==
Higuera earned six caps for Spain, the first arriving on 15 January 1992 in a friendly against Portugal where he replaced the injured Emilio Butragueño early into the 0–0 draw in Torres Novas.

=== International goal ===
Scores and results list Spain's goal tally first, score column indicates score after each Higuera goal.

List of international goals scored by Francisco Higuera
No.	Date	Venue	Opponent	Score	Result	Competition
1	7 September 1994	Tsirion Stadium, Limassol, Cyprus	Cyprus	1–0	2–1	Euro 1996 qualifying

== Honours ==
Zaragoza

- Copa del Rey: 1993–94
- UEFA Cup Winners' Cup: 1994–95
