= José Luis Loreto =

Spanish footballer and manager

Personal information
- Full name: José Luis Rodríguez Loreto
- Date of birth: 10 February 1971 (age 55)
- Place of birth: Seville, Spain
- Height: 1.78 m (5 ft 10 in)
- Position: Striker

Team information
- Current team: Cuarte (manager)

Youth career
- Betis

Senior career*
| Years | Team | Apps | (Gls) |
| 1989–1990 | Betis B | | |
| 1990–1994 | Betis | 58 | (7) |
| 1993–1994 | → Córdoba (loan) | 35 | (24) |
| 1994–1996 | Zaragoza | 12 | (0) |
| 1995–1996 | → Logroñés (loan) | 35 | (10) |
| 1996–1999 | Córdoba | 100 | (36) |
| 1999–2000 | Cádiz | 30 | (2) |
| 2000–2003 | Murcia | 106 | (34) |
| 2003–2004 | Cartagena | 39 | (4) |
| 2004–2005 | Orihuela | 19 | (5) |
| 2005–2006 | Molinense | 20 | (9) |
| Total | | 454 | (131) |

International career
| 1987 | Spain U16 | 1 | (0) |
| 1988 | Spain U18 | 3 | (0) |
| 1990–1991 | Spain U21 | 2 | (0) |
| 1991 | Spain U23 | 2 | (0) |

Managerial career
- 2006–2007: Molinense (youth)
- 2007–2012: Valdefierro (youth)
- 2012–2013: Ebro
- 2013–2014: Ejea
- 2014–2015: Ebro
- 2015–2017: Ejea
- 2017–2018: Brea
- 2018–2020: Zaragoza (assistant)
- 2021: Murcia
- 2022: Pulpileño
- 2023–: Cuarte
- * Club domestic league appearances and goals

José Luis Rodríguez Loreto (born 10 February 1971) is a Spanish retired footballer who played as a striker, currently manager of CD Cuarte.

Over six seasons, he amassed Segunda División figures of 176 games and 49 goals in representation of Betis, Logroñés and Murcia. In La Liga, he totalled 35 appearances for Betis and Zaragoza.

== Club career ==
Loreto was born in Seville, Andalusia. After making his professional debut with Real Betis, scoring two goals in 23 games for an eventual La Liga relegation in the 1990–91 season, he excelled at neighbours Córdoba CF in the Segunda División B, which prompted a return to the top flight as he signed for Real Zaragoza.

However, Loreto was grossly unsettled at the Aragonese, and played one season in the Segunda División, being crucial for CD Logroñés' promotion whilst on loan. At the end of the campaign, he was released and spent a further four years in the third tier with Córdoba and Cádiz CF.

Loreto's career revived the following years, with Real Murcia CF, being relatively important as the team returned to the top division in 2003 by netting four times in 26 matches. He was subsequently released, and ended his career in 2006 at the age of 35 following spells in the lower leagues.

== Honours ==
Zaragoza

- UEFA Cup Winners' Cup: 1994–95

Murcia

- Segunda División: 2002–03
