= Paqui =

Spanish footballer

Personal information
- Full name: Francisco Nicolás Veza Fragoso
- Date of birth: 6 December 1970 (age 55)
- Place of birth: Alicante, Spain
- Height: 1.79 m (5 ft 10 in)
- Position: Left-back

Youth career
- Hércules
- Barcelona

Senior career*
Years	Team	Apps	(Gls)
1988–1989	Barcelona C	34	(0)
1989–1990	Barcelona B	18	(1)
1990–1995	Tenerife	100	(0)
1995–1996	Zaragoza	26	(0)
1996–1997	Hércules	21	(0)
1997–2002	Las Palmas	170	(6)
2002–2003	Osasuna	5	(0)
2003–2004	Las Palmas	10	(0)
Total		384	(7)

International career
1988–1990	Spain U19	6	(0)
1989–1990	Spain U20	5	(0)
1990–1991	Spain U21	3	(0)
- * Club domestic league appearances and goals

Olympic medal record

Representing Spain

Men's Football
Gold medal – first place	1992 Barcelona	Team competition

Francisco Nicolás Veza Fragoso (born 6 December 1970), known as Paqui, is a Spanish former professional footballer who played as a left-back.

He represented six clubs in a 16-year senior career, mainly Tenerife and Las Palmas.

== Club career ==
Paqui was born in Alicante, Province of Valencia. A FC Barcelona youth graduate (he only played for the Catalans' C and B teams as a senior, however) he went on to represent CD Tenerife, Real Zaragoza, Hércules CF and UD Las Palmas; he was instrumental in the latter's 2000 return to La Liga, and also had an unassuming spell at fellow top-flight club CA Osasuna in the 2002–03 season.

Paqui retired in June 2004 aged 33, after Las Palmas' relegation to Segunda División B. He totalled 221 matches and two goals in the top tier.

== International career ==
Paqui was part of the Spain under-20 squad at the 1989 FIFA World Youth Championship in Saudi Arabia. He also helped the Olympic team to win the gold medal in 1992 in Barcelona.

== Honours ==
Las Palmas

- Segunda División: 1999–2000

Spain U23

- Summer Olympic Games: 1992
