= Juan Esnáider =

Argentine footballer and manager (born 1973)

Personal information
- Full name: Juan Eduardo Esnáider Belén
- Date of birth: 5 March 1973 (age 53)
- Place of birth: Mar del Plata, Argentina
- Height: 1.78 m (5 ft 10 in)
- Position: Striker

Youth career
- Ferro Carril Oeste

Senior career*
Years	Team	Apps	(Gls)
1990–1991	Ferro Carril Oeste	6	(0)
1991–1993	Real Madrid B	44	(18)
1991–1993	Real Madrid	10	(1)
1993–1995	Zaragoza	61	(29)
1995–1996	Real Madrid	20	(1)
1996–1997	Atlético Madrid	35	(16)
1997–1998	Espanyol	37	(15)
1999–2001	Juventus	16	(0)
2000–2001	→ Zaragoza (loan)	17	(11)
2001	Porto	3	(0)
2002	Cadetes San Martín		
2002	River Plate	9	(0)
2003	Ajaccio	4	(0)
2003–2004	Murcia	17	(1)
2005	Newell's Old Boys	10	(1)
Total		261	(83)

International career
1991	Argentina U20	7	(7)
1995–1997	Argentina	3	(3)

Managerial career
- 2009–2010: Getafe (assistant)
- 2011–2012: Zaragoza B
- 2013: Córdoba
- 2016: Getafe
- 2017–2019: JEF United Chiba
- 2023: Renofa Yamaguchi
- 2024: PSBS Biak
- * Club domestic league appearances and goals

Juan Eduardo Esnáider Belén (Spanish pronunciation: [ˈxwan esˈnajðeɾ]; born 5 March 1973) is an Argentine former professional footballer who played as a striker, currently a manager.

Having spent most of his career in Spain, he was known as a powerful player with an excellent aerial game. He started at Real Madrid in that country, having little impact with its first team and going on to represent another four clubs (mostly Real Zaragoza), amassing La Liga totals of 197 matches and 74 goals. Other than in his own country, he also competed in Italy (Juventus), Portugal and France.

In 2011, Esnáider started working as a coach.

== Club career ==
Born in Mar del Plata, Buenos Aires Province, Esnáider began his footballing career with Ferro Carril Oeste, and made his professional debut against Vélez Sarsfield on 2 September 1990. After only six games, he was bought by Real Madrid, and still managed two first-team appearances during the 1990–91 season, also going on to score nearly 20 goals for the reserves in the Segunda División.

However, Esnáider never really settled in the main squad, and moved on loan to Real Zaragoza for 1993–94 (with the latter having the option to buy at the end of the campaign). He quickly developed into one of European football's most in-form strikers and, already property of the Aragonese side, helped them to the 1994–95 UEFA Cup Winners' Cup, scoring in the final against Arsenal and being the tournament's second-best scorer behind Ian Wright (he also added 16 in La Liga).

Real Madrid paid Zaragoza more than double they had received in July 1995, but Esnáider only netted once during another disappointing season. Signed by Atlético Madrid for 1996–97 – immediately after an historic double – he again displayed his best football, with 21 goals in all competitions.

Esnáider joined Barcelona-based Espanyol after being released by Atlético, and produced another good individual season with 13 goals in the league. In January 1999, he was signed by Juventus for an estimated fee of £4,5 million, as an intended replacement for Alessandro Del Piero who had just been sidelined with a serious knee injury, but was unable to settle at the Turin-based team. In late December 2000 he returned to Zaragoza and, with 11 goals in just 17 matches, helped the side avoid relegation (that included two on 14 April 2001 in a 4–4 tie at Barcelona), adding his second Copa del Rey in the process.

Subsequently, Esnáider's career remained low-profile, with spells at Porto (arriving the season after countryman Juan Antonio Pizzi, who also left unsettled after a few months), Cadetes de San Martín, River Plate, Ajaccio and Real Murcia, before retiring at Newell's Old Boys in Argentina.

== International career ==
Esnáider represented Argentina on three occasions, his debut coming in 1995. Previously, he appeared with the under-20s at the 1991 FIFA World Youth Championship held in Portugal.

== Coaching career ==
Esnáider obtained his coaching degree in 2008 and, in April of the following year, became Getafe's assistant to former Real Madrid teammate Míchel, who was replacing Víctor Muñoz due to poor results. He occupied the position until December 2010.

On 8 April 2013, having spent one full season in the Segunda División B with Zaragoza's reserves, Esnáider was appointed at Córdoba until June after the sacking of Rafael Berges. He won only two of nine games during his spell, as the team ranked 14th in the second tier.

Esnáider returned to Getafe on 12 April 2016 but now as head coach, taking over from the dismissed Fran Escribá. His first match in the Spanish top flight – as a manager – took place four days later, in a 5–1 home loss to his former club Real Madrid.

On 26 November 2016, Esnáider became head coach of JEF United Chiba in the J2 League. In his first year, the side reached the playoffs but was eliminated by Nagoya Grampus in the semi-finals. In March 2019, he was sacked following poor results accumulated in the 2018 campaign and the first four games of the following one.

Esnáider remained in the Japanese second tier on 29 May 2023, on a deal at Renofa Yamaguchi. He stepped down on 13 November.

On 13 May 2024, Esnáider was appointed manager of PSBS Biak, recently promoted to the Super League (Indonesia). He was relieved of his duties on 10 September, after losing the first three fixtures.

== Temperament ==
During his first spell at Zaragoza and while at Atlético Madrid, Esnáider was considered by many as one of the most promising strikers in European football. However, this was often overshadowed by his misconduct and foul play in many matches:

After missing a penalty kick in Atlético's match against Ajax, in the 1996–97 edition of the UEFA Champions League, he made a ferocious two-footed tackle at Richard Witschge, but was lucky to receive only a yellow card. Minutes later, he was enraged when he was substituted by coach Radomir Antić, shouting out profanities; the next day, he was transferlisted by illusive chairman Jesús Gil.

In 2000–01's dying stages, as Zaragoza fought to retain their top-division status, Esnáider brutally assaulted a Celta de Vigo player with his elbow (with the consequent dismissal), allegedly after being told by the club he would be deemed surplus to requirements for the following season. The player denied, however, this as the main reason for the incident.

At the 1991 World Youth Championships, Esnáider was sent off for headbutting referee Guy Goethals and calling him a "son of a whore". He was banned from international football for a year, and Argentina were disqualified from the following edition of the tournament.

== Personal life ==
Esnáider was of Volga German and Spanish descent. His surname was a Spanish spelling of the German Schneider, meaning "tailor".

On Christmas Day 2012, Esnáider lost a 17-year-old son to illness. A son also named Juan, was also a footballer and a forward, and he too represented Zaragoza; another son, Facundo was born during his spell in Porto, and also played the sport.

== Career statistics ==
=== International ===
Scores and results list Argentina's goal tally first, score column indicates score after each Esnáider goal.

List of international goals scored by Juan Esnáider
No.	Date	Venue	Opponent	Score	Result	Competition
1	21 December 1995	Estadio Ciudad de Mendoza, Mendoza, Argentina	Venezuela	1–0	6–0	Friendly
2	21 December 1995	Estadio Ciudad de Mendoza, Mendoza, Argentina	Venezuela	5–0	6–0	Friendly
3	28 December 1996	Estadio José María Minella, Mar del Plata, Argentina	FR Yugoslavia	1–1	2–3	Friendly

== Managerial statistics ==
As of match played 23 August 2024

Managerial record by team and tenure
Team	From	To	Record							
Team	From	To	G	W	D	L	GF	GA	GD	Win %
Zaragoza B	1 July 2011	30 June 2012	40	13	11	16	50	60	−10	32.50
Córdoba	8 April 2013	11 June 2013	9	2	1	6	12	14	−2	22.22
Getafe	12 April 2016	26 September 2016	14	3	5	6	13	22	−9	21.43
JEF United Chiba	26 February 2017	17 March 2019	89	37	16	36	148	144	+4	41.57
Renofa Yamaguchi	8 June 2023	13 November 2023	23	6	7	10	20	33	−13	26.09
PSBS Biak	14 May 2024	10 September 2024	3	0	0	3	2	7	−5	0.00
Career total			178	61	40	77	245	280	−35	34.27

== Honours ==
Real Madrid

- Copa del Rey: 1992–93

Zaragoza

- Copa del Rey: 1993–94, 2000–01
- UEFA Cup Winners' Cup: 1994–95

Juventus

- UEFA Intertoto Cup: 1999

River Plate

- Argentine Primera División: 2002 Clausura
