= Fernando Cáceres =

Argentine footballer (born 1969)

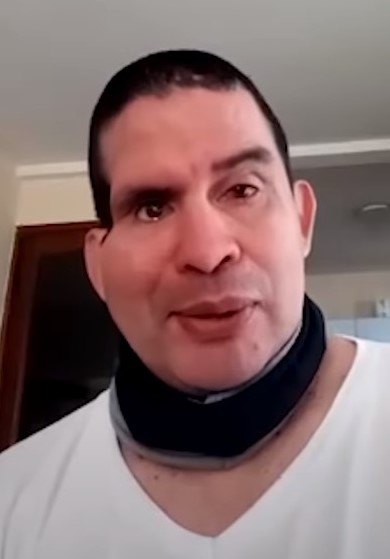
- Cáceres in 2020

Personal information
- Full name: Fernando Gabriel Cáceres
- Date of birth: 7 February 1969 (age 57)
- Place of birth: San Isidro, Argentina
- Height: 1.80 m (5 ft 11 in)
- Position: Centre-back

Youth career
- Argentinos Juniors

Senior career*
Years	Team	Apps	(Gls)
1986–1991	Argentinos Juniors	113	(5)
1991–1993	River Plate	71	(11)
1993–1996	Zaragoza	91	(3)
1996	Boca Juniors	15	(1)
1996–1998	Valencia	51	(0)
1998–2004	Celta	198	(3)
2004	Córdoba	11	(0)
2005–2006	Independiente	46	(0)
2006–2007	Argentinos Juniors	0	(0)
Total		596	(23)

International career
1992–1997	Argentina	24	(1)
- * Club domestic league appearances and goals

Fernando Gabriel Cáceres (born 7 February 1969) is an Argentine retired professional footballer who played as a central defender.

He played for several clubs in the Primera División and La Liga during his professional career, spending 11 years in the latter competition and appearing in 340 games.

Cáceres represented Argentina at the 1994 World Cup and two Copa América tournaments.

== Club career ==
Born in San Isidro, Buenos Aires, Cáceres began playing professional football at Argentinos Juniors. In 1991 he was transferred to Club Atlético River Plate where he won his first title, the 1991 Apertura.

Cáceres then moved to Spain to play for Real Zaragoza, where he won the Copa del Rey in 1994 and the UEFA Cup Winners' Cup the following year. An undisputed starter from the beginnings, he played 124 official games in three seasons.

Cáceres returned to Argentina for a brief spell at Boca Juniors, before moving back to Spain in late 1996 and sign for Valencia CF, where he stayed until the end of the 1997–98 campaign. He joined RC Celta de Vigo aged almost 29, helping to the Galicians' La Liga and European consolidation. In six seasons with the club he played 218 matches in all competitions, scoring five goals most notably contributing 33 appearances in 2002–03 as his team qualified for the UEFA Champions League for the first time ever.

In January 2005, after a four-month spell with Córdoba CF in the Segunda División, Cáceres returned to his country once again after signing with Club Atlético Independiente, joining a select group of players who played for River Plate, Boca Juniors and Independiente. In 2006 he rejoined Argentinos Juniors, the club where he began his career 20 years earlier, seeing out his career at 38.

== International career ==
Cáceres won the South American Under-17 Football Championship in 1985. At full international level, he earned 24 caps for the Argentina national team, and was also part of the squad that won the 1993 Copa América and the one that took part in the 1994 FIFA World Cup.

== Personal life ==
On 1 November 2009, Cáceres was shot in the head in an attempted robbery while driving his car in a Buenos Aires suburb. He was kept in a drug-induced coma for eight weeks and later recovered.

== Career statistics ==
=== International ===
Appearances and goals by national team and year
National team	Year	Apps	Goals
Argentina	1992	1	0
Argentina	1993	6	0
Argentina	1994	6	0
Argentina	1995	8	0
Argentina	1996	2	0
Argentina	1997	1	1
Total		24	1

Scores and results list Argentina's goal tally first, score column indicates score after each Cáceres goal.

List of international goals scored by Fernando Cáceres
No.	Date	Venue	Opponent	Score	Result	Competition	Ref.
1	16 November 1997	La Bombonera, Buenos Aires, Argentina	Colombia	1–1	1–1	1998 FIFA World Cup qualification	

== Honours ==
River Plate

- Argentine Primera División: Apertura 1991

Zaragoza

- Copa del Rey: 1993–94
- UEFA Cup Winners' Cup: 1994–95

Celta

- UEFA Intertoto Cup: 2000

Argentina

- Copa América: 1993
