= José Belman =

Spanish footballer and coach

Personal information
- Full name: José Francisco Belman González
- Date of birth: 16 June 1971 (age 55)
- Place of birth: Málaga, Spain
- Height: 1.82 m (5 ft 11 1/2 in)
- Position: Goalkeeper

Youth career
- 1988–1990: Málaga

Senior career*
Years	Team	Apps	(Gls)
1990–1992	Málaga	0	(0)
1991–1992	→ Fabril Deportivo (loan)	29	(0)
1992–1993	Linense	11	(0)
1993–1994	Zaragoza B		
1994–1997	Zaragoza	13	(0)
1997–1998	Valladolid	0	(0)
1998–2000	Hércules	68	(0)
2001–2008	Nacional	38	(0)
Total		159	(0)

International career
1987	Spain U17	1	(0)
1988	Spain U18	2	(0)
- * Club domestic league appearances and goals

José Francisco Belman González (born 16 June 1971) is a Spanish former professional footballer who played as a goalkeeper.

== Playing career ==
Belman was born in Málaga, Andalusia. After playing in his early years with former denominations of Málaga CF he went on to represent Real Balompédica Linense, Real Zaragoza (with a stint in its B team), Real Valladolid, Hércules CF and C.D. Nacional. He was mostly used as a backup; for example, 30 of his 38 games with his last club came in his first season, when he helped the Madeirans to promote to the Portuguese Primeira Liga.

Belman's best input in La Liga consisted of 11 appearances with Zaragoza in 1995–96, where he conceded 16 goals. He also featured in two UEFA Cup Winners' Cup matches in that campaign with the Aragonese, the 2–1 quarter-final aggregate loss against fellow Spaniards Deportivo de La Coruña.

== Coaching career ==
Shortly after retiring at the age of 37, Belman began working as a goalkeeper coach. After two years with Real Madrid's under-19 he returned to his main club Nacional in 2010, leaving abruptly in late 2012 to join Santos Laguna.

Belman signed with Scottish side Rangers in March 2017, to work under Pedro Caixinha in the same capacity. On 26 October of that year, both left Ibrox Stadium.

== Personal life ==
Belman's son, Javier, was also a footballer and a goalkeeper. He was developed at Real Madrid.
