= Miguel Pardeza =

Spanish footballer

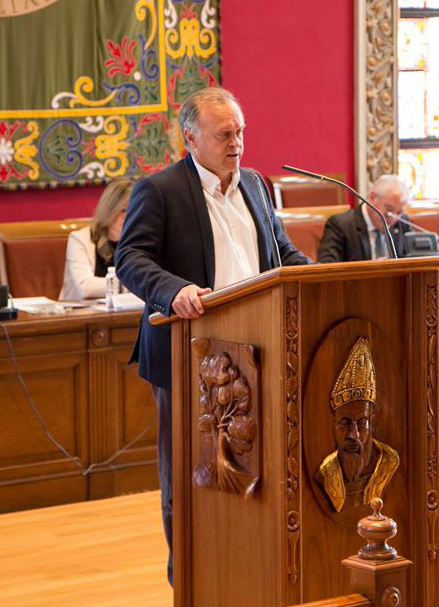
- Pardeza receiving an honorary award at the University of Zaragoza

Personal information
- Full name: Miguel Pardeza Pichardo
- Date of birth: 8 February 1965 (age 61)
- Place of birth: La Palma del Condado, Spain
- Height: 1.65 m (5 ft 5 in)
- Position: Forward

Youth career
- 1979–1982: Real Madrid

Senior career*
Years	Team	Apps	(Gls)
1982–1985	Castilla	69	(14)
1984–1987	Real Madrid	28	(5)
1985–1986	→ Zaragoza (loan)	26	(5)
1987–1997	Zaragoza	271	(71)
1997–1999	Puebla	36	(6)
Total		430	(101)

International career
1980–1981	Spain U16	3	(1)
1982–1983	Spain U18	13	(1)
1986	Spain U21	3	(0)
1987–1988	Spain U23	2	(0)
1989–1990	Spain	5	(0)
- * Club domestic league appearances and goals

Miguel Pardeza Pichardo (born 8 February 1965) is a Spanish former professional footballer who played as a forward.

He was part of Real Madrid's generation of footballers known as La Quinta del Buitre, but spent the better part of his career at Real Zaragoza. After retiring as a player, he returned to his first club in directorial capacities.

Having appeared in 325 La Liga matches over 13 seasons (81 goals scored), Pardeza was part of the Spain squad at the 1990 World Cup.

== Club career ==
Born in La Palma del Condado, Province of Huelva, Pardeza was a youth system graduate at Real Madrid, making his first-team debut during the 1983–84 season. After a loan at Real Zaragoza he returned to the Santiago Bernabéu Stadium, contributing 25 games and five goals to the club's victory in the 1986–87 national championship.

With the 1987–88 campaign already underway, Pardeza signed a permanent five-year contract with Zaragoza, going on to become one of the Aragonese team's most prominent members as an attacking player with skills, vision and scoring ability (he achieved double figures in four seasons). In 1994–95, he netted 11 La Liga goals while also helping them to that season's UEFA Cup Winners' Cup against Arsenal.

After a quick spell with Mexico's Puebla FC, where he rejoined former Zaragoza teammate Francisco Higuera, Pardeza retired in 1999 at age 34. In June 2002, he became technical director of his former side Zaragoza and, seven years later, rejoined his first club Real Madrid in the same capacity following Florentino Pérez's return as president.

== International career ==
After playing at youth and Olympic level, Pardeza earned five caps for Spain. He made his debut on 11 October 1989 in a 2–2 draw against Hungary in Budapest for the 1990 FIFA World Cup qualifiers, and his last appearance came in the finals in Italy on 21 June 1990, as he appeared two minutes in the 2–1 victory over Belgium.

== Outside football ==
After four years of law studies and Hispanic philology at the University of Zaragoza (1994–99), Pardeza prepared a thesis on César González-Ruano, a Spanish journalist/writer. He also collaborated with newspapers and radios, and was a speaker for the Association of Spanish Footballers from 1990, acting as its secretary-general since 1996.

== Honours ==
Real Madrid

- La Liga: 1986–87

Zaragoza

- Copa del Rey: 1985–86, 1993–94
- UEFA Cup Winners' Cup: 1994–95
