= 1988–89 Copa del Rey =

87th Copa del Rey

Tournament details
- Country: Spain

Final positions
- Champions: Real Madrid
- Runners-up: Valladolid

The 1988–89 Copa del Rey was the 87th staging of the Spanish Cup. The competition began on 31 August 1988 and concluded on 30 June 1989 with the final.

== Schedule ==
The schedule of the competition was as follows, some matches would be played on different dates.

Round	Date	Fixtures	Clubs
First round	31 August 1988	50	120 → 70
First round	15 September 1988	50	120 → 70
Second round	28 September 1988	25	70 → 45
Second round	19 October 1988	25	70 → 45
Third round	2 November 1988	13	45 → 32
Third round	8 December 1988	13	45 → 32
Round of 32	25 January 1989	16	32 → 16
Round of 32	1 February 1989	16	32 → 16
Round of 16	15 February 1989	8	16 → 8
Round of 16	22 February 1989	8	16 → 8
Quarter-finals	29 March 1989	4	8 → 4
Quarter-finals	12 April 1989	4	8 → 4
Semi-finals	7 June 1989	2	4 → 2
Semi-finals	21 June 1989	2	4 → 2
Final	30 June 1989	1	2 → 1

== First round ==
Team 1	Agg.	Team 2	1st leg	2nd leg
Olímpic	1–3	Alcoyano	1–1	0–2
Mestalla	0–1	Gandía	0–0	0–1
Cultural y Deportiva Leonesa	2–4	Lugo	2–1	0–3
Ourense	2–1	Pontevedra	0–1	2–0
Basconia	3–4	Lemona	1–1	2–3
Daimiel	1–3	Córdoba	1–1	0–2
Bergantiños	1–2	Endesa As Pontes	1–1	0–1
Teruel	1–2	Levante	1–1	0–1
Telde	0–5	Tenerife	0–0	0–5
Langreo	3–1	Caudal Deportivo	2–1	1–0
Barcelona C	3–4	FC Andorra	2–3	1–1
Real Ávila	2–2 (5–4 p)	Cacereño	0–0	2–2
Cieza	1–2	Eldense	1–1	0–1
Melilla	5–0	Ronda	5–0	0–0
Mollerussa	5–3	Gimnàstic de Tarragona	3–0	2–3
Real Betis B	2–0	Sevilla Atlético	1–0	1–0
Júpiter	0–4	L'Hospitalet	0–1	0–3
Laredo	1–5	Racing Santander	0–0	1–5
Eibar	3–0	Osasuna B	2–0	1–0
Albacete Balompié	1–3	Elche	0–1	1–2
Ceuta	3–1	Real Balompédica Linense	2–1	1–0
Linares	2–3	Granada	1–1	1–2
Fraga	1–2	Lleida	0–0	1–2
Villarreal	2–3	Castellón	1–1	1–2
Alzira	3–5	Sporting Mahonés	2–1	1–4
Almería	3–4	Lorca Deportiva	2–1	1–3
Benidorm	2–5	Hércules	2–1	0–4
Constància	1–3	Cala Millor	0–0	1–3
Ponferradina	1–3	Salamanca	0–1	1–2
Badajoz	0–6	Recreativo de Huelva	0–0	0–6
Girona	1–11	Figueres	1–6	0–5
Arnedo	3–6	San Sebastian	1–2	2–4
Real Avilés	1–3	Real Oviedo	1–2	0–1
Poblense	2–4	Atlético Baleares	0–1	2–3
Atlético Marbella	1–4	Málaga	1–1	0–3
Plasencia	2–4	Castilla	2–4	0–0
Arenteiro	2–5	Deportivo La Coruña	2–1	0–4
Las Palmas Atlético	0–3	Maspalomas	0–1	0–2
Rayo Cantabria	0–0 (?–? p)	Gimnastica de Torrelavega	0–0	0–0
Atlético Madrid B	2–2 (3–2 p)	Rayo Vallecano	1–0	1–2
Getafe	1–1 (?–? p)	Leganés	0–1	1–0
San Sebastián de los Reyes	1–5	Alcalá	1–1	0–4
Conquense	1–4	Parla	1–1	0–3
Atlético Sanluqueño	0–2	Xerez	0–0	0–2
Aragón	3–5	Real Burgos	0–1	3–4
Terrassa	1–2	Barcelona B	1–1	0–1
Mirandés	2–1	Endesa Andorra	2–0	0–1
Cultural de Durango	1–3	Sestao	0–2	1–1
Lalín	3–4	Arosa	2–3	1–1

== Second round ==
Team 1	Agg.	Team 2	1st leg	2nd leg
Real Betis B	1–7	Recreativo de Huelva	1–1	0–6
Endesa As Pontes	1–3	Deportivo La Coruña	1–1	0–2
Lemona	1–4	Sestao	0–1	1–3
Langreo	0–8	Real Oviedo	0–4	0–4
L'Hospitalet	1–2	Barcelona B	1–1	0–1
Andorra	3–5	Figueres	0–3	3–2
Ourense	2–3	Arosa	2–1	0–2
Córdoba	5–2	Granada	3–1	2–1
Gandía	2–3	Sporting Mahonés	1–1	1–2
Lorca Deportiva	0–2	Cartagena	0–1	0–1
Real Ávila	4–2	Castilla	4–2	0–0
Alcalá	4–2	Atlético Madrid B	1–0	3–2
Parla	0–2	Leganés	0–0	0–2
San Sebastián	3–1	Eibar	1–0	2–1
Mollerussa	1–3	Lleida	1–3	0–0
Levante	4–7	Castellón	2–1	2–6
Alcoyano	1–3	Hércules	1–1	0–2
Eldense	2–2 (3–5 p)	Elche	1–1	1–1
Melilla	3–4	Málaga	2–3	1–1
Maspalomas	2–3	CD Tenerife	2–2	0–1
Cala Millor	0–4	Atlético Baleares	0–1	0–3
Ceuta	1–3	Xerez	1–1	0–2
Lugo	3–2	Salamanca	2–0	1–2
Gimnastica de Torrelavega	0–6	Racing Santander	0–1	0–5
Mirandés	2–7	Real Burgos	1–2	1–5

== Third round ==
Team 1	Agg.	Team 2	1st leg	2nd leg
Alcalá	1–2	Cartagena	1–0	0–2
Arosa	3–0	Hércules	1–0	2–0
Atlético Baleares	0–4	Recreativo de Huelva	0–1	0–3
Real Ávila	2–4	Elche	1–1	1–3
Barcelona B	2–3	Racing Santander	1–2	1–1
Córdoba	1–2	Xerez	0–2	1–0
Figueres	2–4	Lleida	1–2	1–2
Leganés	1–7	Málaga	1–1	0–6
Lugo	2–3	Sestao	1–2	1–1
Sabadell	4–2	Real Oviedo	2–0	2–2
San Sebastián	6–7	Deportivo La Coruña	3–1	3–6
Sporting Mahonés	3–5	Real Burgos	3–1	0–4
Tenerife	3–2	Castellón	2–0	1–2

== Round of 32 ==
Team 1	Agg.	Team 2	1st leg	2nd leg
Arosa	0–2	Real Sociedad	0–1	0–1
Atlético Madrid	3–0	Las Palmas	1–0	2–0
Real Betis	5–1	Logroñés	5–1	0–0
Real Burgos	1–3	Mallorca	1–1	0–2
Cartagena	0–7	Barcelona	0–3	0–4
Deportivo La Coruña	3–2	Sabadell	3–1	0–1
Elche	2–3	Real Madrid	1–2	1–1
Xerez	3–6	Celta de Vigo	2–2	1–4
Lleida	3–5	Cádiz	1–3	2–2
Málaga	0–1	Espanyol	0–0	0–1
Osasuna	2–1	Sevilla	1–0	1–1
Racing Santander	3–2	Valencia	0–0	3–2
Recreativo Huelva	5–4	Real Murcia	3–1	2–3
Sestao	0–1	Athletic de Bilbao	0–0	0–1
Tenerife	3–6	Sporting Gijón	2–1	1–5
Real Zaragoza	1–2	Real Valladolid	0–1	1–1

== Round of 16 ==
Team 1	Agg.	Team 2	1st leg	2nd leg
Athletic Bilbao	2–4	Real Valladolid	1–1	1–3
Cádiz	2–2 (4–2 p)	Betis	0–0	2–2
Celta	1–1 (4–3 p)	Osasuna	1–0	0–1
Deportivo de La Coruña	1–1 (3–1 p)	Real Sociedad	0–0	1–1
Español	0–3	Atlético de Madrid	0–0	0–3
Racing Santander	2–4	Barcelona	0–1	2–3
Recreativo de Huelva	0–0 (3–5 p)	Mallorca	0–0	0–0
Sporting Gijón	7–10	Real Madrid	5–5	2–5

=== First leg ===
15 February 1989	Athletic Bilbao	1–1	Real Valladolid	Bilbao
	Ferreira 52'	Report (in Spanish)	Alberto 29'	Stadium: San Mamés Stadium; Attendance: 35,000; Referee: Sánchez Moreno (Community of Madrid)

15 February 1989	Cádiz CF	0–0	Real Betis	Cádiz
		Report (in Spanish)		Stadium: Estadio Ramón de Carranza; Attendance: 8,000; Referee: Emilio Soriano Aladrén (Community of Madrid)

15 February 1989	Recreativo Huelva	0–0	RCD Mallorca	Huelva
		Report (in Spanish)		Stadium: Estadio Colombino; Attendance: 10,000; Referee: Rubio Valdivieso (Castile and León)

15 February 1989	Celta Vigo	1–0	CA Osasuna	Vigo
	Zambrano 24'	Report (in Spanish)		Stadium: Estadio Balaídos; Attendance: 20,000; Referee: Calvo Córdoba (Castile and León)

15 February 1989	Deportivo La Coruña	0–0	Real Sociedad	A Coruña
		Report (in Spanish)		Stadium: Estadio Riazor; Attendance: 15,000; Referee: Pes Pérez (Aragon)

15 February 1989	RCD Español	0–0	Atlético Madrid	Barcelona
		Report (in Spanish)		Stadium: Sarrià; Attendance: 15,000; Referee: Urízar Azpitarte (Basque Country (autonomous community))

15 February 1989	Racing Santander	0–1	FC Barcelona	Santander
		Report (in Spanish)	Lineker 34'	Stadium: Campos de Sport de El Sardinero; Attendance: 15,000; Referee: Urío Velázquez (Basque Country (autonomous community))

15 February 1989	Sporting Gijón	5–5	Real Madrid	Gijón
	Joaquín 20' (pen.) 44' (pen.); Felipe 74'; Narciso 76'; Villa 80'	Report (in Spanish)	Esteban 6'; Losada 8', 57'; Schuster 65'; Sanchís 72'	Stadium: El Molinón; Attendance: 15,000; Referee: Sánchez Arminio (Cantabria)

=== Second leg ===
22 February 1989	Real Valladolid	3–1	Athletic Bilbao	Valladolid
	Fonseca 35'; Patricio Sánchez 74'; Alberto 84'	Report (in Spanish)	Mendiguren 10'	Stadium: Estadio Nuevo José Zorrilla; Attendance: 14,000; Referee: García de Loza (Galicia (Spain))

22 February 1989	Real Betis	2–2 (a.e.t.) (2–4 p)	Cádiz CF	Seville
	Rincón 27'; Hierro 107'	Report (in Spanish)	Mora 74', 97'	Stadium: Estadio Benito Villamarín; Attendance: 16,000; Referee: Soriano Aladrén (Castile and León)
	Penalties
	López Ufarte (penalty scored); Job (penalty scored); Hierro (penalty missed); Romo (penalty missed)		Villa (penalty scored); Mágico González (penalty missed); Mora (penalty scored); Onésimo (penalty scored); Carmelo (penalty scored)

22 February 1989	CA Osasuna	1–0 (a.e.t.) (3–4 p)	Celta Vigo	Vitoria-Gasteiz
	Roberto Elvira 85'	Report (in Spanish)		Stadium: Mendizorrotza Stadium; Attendance: 17,000; Referee: Andújar Oliver (Andalusia)
	Penalties
	Ziganda (penalty missed); Sola (penalty missed); Milinković (penalty scored); Pepín (penalty scored); Bustingorri (penalty scored); Roberto Elvira (penalty missed)		Amarildo (penalty scored); Julio Prieto (penalty scored); Camilo (penalty scored); Zambrano (penalty missed); Hagan (penalty missed); Espinosa (penalty scored)

22 February 1989	Real Sociedad	1–1	Deportivo La Coruña	San Sebastián
	Zamora 75'	Report (in Spanish)	Hidalgo 71'	Stadium: Atotxa Stadium; Attendance: 10,000; Referee: Albert Giménez (Catalonia)

22 February 1989	Atlético Madrid	3–0	RCD Español	Madrid
	Manolo 15'; Marina 58'; Tomás 89'	Report (in Spanish)		Stadium: Vicente Calderón Stadium; Attendance: 18,000; Referee: Urizar Azpitarte (Basque Country (autonomous community))

22 February 1989	FC Barcelona	3–2	Racing Santander	Barcelona
	Carrasco 34'; Valverde 48'; Roberto 77'	Report (in Spanish)	Julián 14', 82'	Stadium: Camp Nou; Attendance: 30,000; Referee: Taboada Soto (Galicia (Spain))

22 February 1989	RCD Mallorca	0–0	Recreativo Huelva	Palma de Mallorca
		Report (in Spanish)		Stadium: Lluís Sitjar Stadium; Attendance: 6,000; Referee: Pérez Gallego (Valencian Community)

22 February 1989	Real Madrid	5–2	Sporting Gijón	Madrid
	Schuster 44'; Hugo Sánchez 55', 66'; Losada 81'; Míchel 89'	Report (in Spanish)	Joaquín 38'; Gallego 73' (o.g.)	Stadium: Santiago Bernabéu Stadium; Attendance: 50,000; Referee: Sánchez Arminio (Cantabria)

== Quarter-finals ==
Team 1	Agg.	Team 2	1st leg	2nd leg
Barcelona	3–7	Atlético de Madrid	3–3	0–4
Deportivo de La Coruña	4–2	Mallorca	4–1	0–1
Real Madrid	4–2	Celta	4–1	0–1
Real Valladolid	2–2 (4–3 p)	Cádiz	2–1	0–1

=== First leg ===
19 March 1989	Real Valladolid	2–1	Cádiz CF	Valladolid
	Peña 77'; Alberto 84'	Report (in Spanish)	Mágico González 62'	Stadium: Estadio Nuevo José Zorrilla; Attendance: 15,000; Referee: Jiménez Muñoz de Morales

29 March 1989	FC Barcelona	3–3	Atlético Madrid	Barcelona
	Julio Alberto 30'; Roberto 53'; Julio Salinas 86'	Report (in Spanish)	Baltazar 36', 48' (pen.), 66'	Stadium: Camp Nou; Attendance: 32,000; Referee: Urío Velázquez (Basque Country (autonomous community))

29 March 1989	Deportivo La Coruña	4–1	RCD Mallorca	A Coruña
	Fontana 25'; Ramón 45' (pen.); Aspiazu 87'; Zaki 88' (o.g.)	Report (in Spanish)	Guillermo 71'	Stadium: Estadio Riazor; Attendance: 10,000; Referee: José María García Aranda (Community of Madrid)

29 March 1989	Real Madrid	4–1	Celta	Madrid
	Hugo Sánchez 40' (pen.), 43'; Aldana 49', 74'	Report (in Spanish)	Amarildo 56' (pen.)	Stadium: Santiago Bernabéu Stadium; Attendance: 40,000; Referee: Sánchez Molina

=== Second leg ===
12 April 1989	Atlético Madrid	4–0	FC Barcelona	Madrid
	Donato 6'; Baltazar 53' (pen.), 69'; Manolo 84'	Report (in Spanish)		Stadium: Vicente Calderón Stadium; Attendance: 45,000; Referee: Urío Velázquez (Basque Country (autonomous community))

12 April 1989	RCD Mallorca	1–0	Deportivo La Coruña	Palma de Mallorca
	Rivas 61'	Report (in Spanish)		Stadium: Lluís Sitjar Stadium; Attendance: 12,000; Referee: Hernández Velázquez (Castile and León)

22 April 1989	Cádiz CF	1–0 (a.e.t.) (3–4 p)	Real Valladolid	Cádiz
	Cortijo 16'	Report (in Spanish)		Stadium: Estadio Ramón de Carranza; Attendance: 20,000; Referee: Mazorra Freire (Catalonia)
	Penalties
	Montero (penalty scored); Cortijo (penalty scored); José (penalty scored); Villa (penalty missed); Carmelo (penalty missed)		Janković (penalty scored); Patri (penalty scored); Minguela (penalty missed); Albis (penalty scored); Gonzalo (penalty scored)

11 May 1989	Celta	1–0	Real Madrid	Vigo
	Zambrano 61'	Report (in Spanish)		Stadium: Estadio Balaídos; Attendance: 12,000; Referee: Sánchez Molina (Castilla–La Mancha)

== Semi-finals ==
Team 1	Agg.	Team 2	1st leg	2nd leg
Atlético Madrid	0–3	Real Madrid	0–2	0–1
Deportivo La Coruña	1–2 (aet)	Real Valladolid	1–0	0–2

=== First leg ===
6 June 1989	Deportivo La Coruña	1–0	Real Valladolid	A Coruña
	Raudnei 36'	Report (in Spanish)		Stadium: Estadio Riazor; Attendance: 15,000; Referee: Emilio Soriano Aladrén (Community of Madrid)

7 June 1989	Atlético Madrid	0–2	Real Madrid	Madrid
		Report (in Spanish)	Butragueño 54'; Schuster 73'	Stadium: Vicente Calderón Stadium; Attendance: 50,000; Referee: Raúl García de Loza (Galicia (Spain))

=== Second leg ===
14 June 1989	Real Valladolid	2–0 (a.e.t.)	Deportivo La Coruña	Valladolid
	Albis 82'; Peña 106'	Report (in Spanish)		Stadium: Nuevo José Zorrilla; Attendance: 27,000; Referee: Emilio Soriano Aladrén (Community of Madrid)

21 June 1989	Real Madrid	1–0	Atlético Madrid	Madrid
	Butragueño 68'	Report (in Spanish)		Stadium: Santiago Bernabéu Stadium; Attendance: 55,000; Referee: Raúl García de Loza (Galicia (Spain))

== Final ==
Team 1	Score	Team 2
Real Madrid CF	1–0	Real Valladolid

Copa del Rey
1988–89 winners
Real Madrid
