= 1989 Copa del Rey final =

Copa del Rey 1989 final
- Event: 1988–89 Copa del Rey
Real Madrid	Real Valladolid
1	0
- Date: 30 June 1989
- Venue: Vicente Calderón Stadium, Madrid
- Referee: Victoriano Sánchez Arminio
- Attendance: 30,000

The 1989 Copa del Rey final was the 87th final of the Copa del Rey. The final was played at Vicente Calderón Stadium in Madrid, on 30 June 1989, being won by Real Madrid, who beat Real Valladolid 1–0.

== Details ==
30 June 1989
21:00 CET

Real Madrid	1–0	Real Valladolid
Gordillo 5'	Report (in Spanish)

Vicente Calderón Stadium, Madrid
Attendance: 30,000
Referee: Victoriano Sánchez Arminio

Real Madrid

Valladolid

GK	1	(Spain) Francisco Buyo
RB	2	(Spain) Chendo
CB	10	(Spain) Ricardo Gallego (c)
CB	5	(Spain) Manuel Sanchís
LB	3	(Spain) Jesús Solana
RM	11	(Spain) Rafael Martín Vázquez		(substituted off) 70'
CM	4	(Spain) Míchel
CM	8	(West Germany) Bernd Schuster
LM	6	(Spain) Rafael Gordillo
FW	7	(Spain) Emilio Butragueño	(yellow card) 36'
FW	9	(Mexico) Hugo Sánchez
Substitutes:
DF	12	(Spain) Miguel Tendillo		(substituted on) 70'
GK	13	(Spain) Agustín
MF	14	(Spain) Adolfo Aldana
DF	15	(Spain) Esteban
FW	16	(Spain) Sebastián Losada
Manager:
(Netherlands) Leo Beenhakker

GK	1	(Socialist Federal Republic of Yugoslavia) Mauro Ravnić
DF	2	(Socialist Federal Republic of Yugoslavia) Branko Miljuš
DF	4	(Spain) Albert Albesa
DF	5	(Spain) Gonzalo
DF	3	(Spain) José Lemos
MF	10	(Spain) Luis Minguela (c)
MF	6	(Spain) Fernando Hierro	(yellow card) 50'
MF	8	(Argentina) Ricardo Albis		(substituted off) 77'
MF	11	(Spain) Luis Miguel Damián
FW	7	(Socialist Federal Republic of Yugoslavia) Janko Janković
FW	9	(Spain) Manolo Peña
Substitutes:
DF	12	(Spain) Enrique Moreno
GK	13	(Spain) Ángel Lozano
MF	14	(Spain) Francisco Javier Cuaresma
FW	15	(Spain) Gregorio Fonseca		(substituted on) 77'
FW	16	(Spain) Alberto
Manager:
(Argentina) Vicente Cantatore

MATCH RULES

- 90 minutes.
- 30 minutes of extra-time if necessary.
- Penalty shoot-out if scores still level.
- Five named substitutes.
- Maximum of two substitutions.
