= 1990–91 Copa del Rey =

89th Copa del Rey

Tournament details
- Country: Spain
- Teams: 86

Final positions
- Champions: Club Atlético de Madrid
- Runner-up: RCD Mallorca

Tournament statistics
- Matches played: 169
- Goals scored: 464 (2.75 per match)

The 1990–91 Copa del Rey was the 89th staging of the Spanish Cup. The competition began on 5 September 1990 and ended on 29 June 1991 with the final.

It was won by Club Atlético de Madrid.

== Fourth round ==
Team 1	Agg.	Team 2	1st leg	2nd leg
Águilas CF	2–4	Rayo Vallecano	0–2	2–2
RSD Alcalá	2–3	Palamós CF	2–0	0–3
FC Andorra	0–6	CD Málaga	0–1	0–5
Real Ávila CF	1–2	Real Oviedo	1–2	0–0
CD Badajoz	2–4	Real Betis	1–0	1–4
Atlético Baleares	0–1	Deportivo de La Coruña	0–0	0–1
Benidorm CD	1–8	Real Valladolid	1–1	0–7
CD Castellón	1–3	RCD Español	1–1	0–2
Cultural de Durango	1–3	Sporting Gijón	1–2	0–1
Getafe CF	3–4	UD Las Palmas	1–2	2–2
SD Huesca	1–1 (4–5 (p.)	Cádiz CF	0–0	1–1
Real Murcia	5–2	Real Burgos CF	3–2	2–0
SD Ponferradina	3–4	Real Zaragoza	1–2	2–2
Racing Santander	1–5	Athletic Bilbao	1–3	0–2
CE Sabadell FC	1–7	RCD Mallorca	0–3	1–4
UD Salamanca	2–3	Celta Vigo	2–2	0–1
CD San Roque	0–2	Orihuela Deportiva CF	0–1	0–1
UE Sant Andreu	2–3	CD Logroñés	2–2	0–1
CF Sporting Mahonés	2–4	Elche CF	1–2	1–2
CD Tenerife	4–2	CA Osasuna	3–0	1–2

== Fifth round ==
Team 1	Agg.	Team 2	1st leg	2nd leg
Cádiz CF	3–1	Athletic Bilbao	1–0	2–1
Deportivo de La Coruña	3–2	CD Málaga	3–2	0–0
Elche CF	2–1	Palamós CF	2–1	0–0
UD Las Palmas	4–1	Celta	2–0	2–1
Real Murcia	1–3	CD Logroñés	1–0	0–3
Orihuela Deportiva CF	2–3	RCD Español	0–0	2–3
Real Oviedo	1–3	RCD Mallorca	1–1	0–2
Rayo Vallecano	0–2	Real Betis	0–0	0–2
Real Valladolid	2–0	CD Tenerife	1–0	1–0
Real Zaragoza	1–2	Sporting Gijón	1–1	0–1

=== First leg ===
9 January 1991	Cádiz CF	1–0	Athletic Bilbao	Cádiz
	Husillos 88'	Report (in Spanish)		Stadium: Ramón de Carranza; Attendance: 11,000; Referee: Emilio Soriano Aladrén

9 January 1991	Deportivo La Coruña	3–2	CD Málaga	A Coruña
	Albístegui 22'; Albis 41'; Uralde 72' (pen.)	Report (in Spanish)	Toledano 1'; Quino 87'	Stadium: Riazor; Attendance: 10,000; Referee: Juan Sánchez Moreno

9 January 1991	Elche CF	2–0	Palamós CF	Elche
	Guina 19'; Crespín 64' (pen.)	Report (in Spanish)		Stadium: Estadio Manuel Martínez Valero; Attendance: 3,000; Referee: Teodosio Hernández Velázquez

9 January 1991	UD Las Palmas	2–0	Celta	Las Palmas
	Orlando 14'; Alexis 75'	Report (in Spanish)		Stadium: Insular; Referee: José Mauro Socorro González

9 January 1991	Real Murcia	1–0	CD Logroñés	Murcia
	Molina 75'	Report (in Spanish)		Stadium: La Condomina; Referee: Antonio Martín Navarrete

9 January 1991	Orihuela Deportiva CF	0–0	RCD Español	Orihuela
		Report (in Spanish)		Stadium: Los Arcos; Referee: Antonio Jesús López Nieto

9 January 1991	Real Oviedo	1–1	RCD Mallorca	Oviedo
	Fermín 59'	Report (in Spanish)	Hassan Nader 90'	Stadium: Carlos Tartiere; Referee: Joaquín Ramos Marcos

9 January 1991	Rayo Vallecano	0–0	Real Betis	Madrid
		Report (in Spanish)		Stadium: Vallecas; Referee: José Merino González

9 January 1991	Real Valladolid	1–0	CD Tenerife	Valladolid
	Fonseca 86'	Report (in Spanish)		Stadium: José Zorrilla; Attendance: 6,000; Referee: Raúl García de Loza

9 January 1991	Real Zaragoza	1–1	Sporting Gijón	Zaragoza
	Higuera 2'	Report (in Spanish)	Narciso 90'	Stadium: La Romareda; Referee: Ricardo Alfonso Álvarez

=== Second leg ===
23 January 1991	Athletic Bilbao	1–2	Cádiz CF	Bilbao
	Valverde 50'	Report (in Spanish)	Dertycia 38', 45'	Stadium: San Mamés; Attendance: 20,000; Referee: Miguel Ángel Marín López

23 January 1991	CD Málaga	0–0	Deportivo La Coruña	Málaga
		Report (in Spanish)		Stadium: La Rosaleda; Attendance: 5,000; Referee: Gonzalo Panadero Martínez

23 January 1991	Palamós CF	0–0	Elche CF	Palamós
		Report (in Spanish)		Stadium: Municipal; Attendance: 1,500; Referee: Antonio Taboada Soto

23 January 1991	Celta	1–2	UD Las Palmas	Vigo
	Mosquera 86'	Report (in Spanish)	Vidal 53', 88'	Stadium: Balaídos; Attendance: 20,000; Referee: Leonardo Esteban Díaz

23 January 1991	CD Logroñés	3–0	Real Murcia	Logroño
	Gilson 14'; Aguilá 26'; Rosagro 76'	Report (in Spanish)		Stadium: Las Gaunas; Referee: Joaquín Ramos Marcos

23 January 1991	RCD Español	3–2	Orihuela Deportiva CF	Barcelona
	Mágico Díaz 7'; Zubillaga 52'; Àlex Garcia 76'	Report (in Spanish)	Sigüenza 33'; García Pitarch 67'	Stadium: Sarrià; Attendance: 5,000; Referee: Joaquín Urío Velázquez

23 January 1991	RCD Mallorca	2–0	Real Oviedo	Palma de Mallorca
	Hassan Nader 83'; Vulić 89' (pen.)	Report (in Spanish)		Stadium: Luís Sitjar Stadium; Attendance: 2,000; Referee: José María Enríquez Negreira

23 January 1991	Real Betis	2–0	Rayo Vallecano	Seville
	Chano 79'; Bílek 89' (pen.)	Report (in Spanish)		Stadium: Benito Villamarín; Referee: Alfonso Pérez Cabeza

23 January 1991	CD Tenerife	0–1	Real Valladolid	Santa Cruz de Tenerife
		Report (in Spanish)	Fonseca 80' (pen.)	Stadium: Estadio Heliodoro Rodríguez López; Referee: Fernando Sosa Saavedra

23 January 1991	Sporting Gijón	1–0	Real Zaragoza	Gijón
	Luis Enrique 60'	Report (in Spanish)		Stadium: El Molinón; Attendance: 8,000; Referee: Ildefonso Urizar Azpitarte

== Round of 16 ==
Team 1	Agg.	Team 2	1st leg	2nd leg
Deportivo La Coruña	2–7	Valencia FC	2–3	0–4
Elche CF	3–4 (aet)	RCD Mallorca	2–1	1–3
RCD Español	2–3	Real Valladolid	2–1	0–2
UD Las Palmas	1–6	FC Barcelona	1–0	0–6
Real Madrid	1–2	Atlético Madrid	1–1	0–1
Real Sociedad	1–2	Sporting Gijón	1–1	0–1
Sevilla FC	6–0	Cádiz CF	3–0	3–0
CD Logroñés	2–0	Real Betis	0–0	2–0

=== First leg ===
6 February 1991	Deportivo La Coruña	2–3	Valencia CF	A Coruña
	Villa 62'; Antonio 71'	Report (in Spanish)	Toni 1'; Roberto 4'; Tomás 80'	Stadium: Riazor; Attendance: 15,000; Referee: Teodoro Valdés Sánchez

6 February 1991	RCD Español	2–1	Real Valladolid	Barcelona
	Wuttke 4' (pen.); Sirakov 40'	Report (in Spanish)	Onésimo 79'	Stadium: Sarrià; Attendance: 10,000; Referee: Abilio Caetano Bueno

6 February 1991	UD Las Palmas	1–0	FC Barcelona	Las Palmas
	Alexis 64'	Report (in Spanish)		Stadium: Insular; Attendance: 10,000; Referee: Ricardo Alfonso Álvarez

6 February 1991	Real Sociedad	1–1	Sporting Gijón	San Sebastián
	Abelardo 32' (o.g.)	Report (in Spanish)	Abelardo 89'	Stadium: Atocha; Attendance: 14,000; Referee: Ángel Calvo Córdova

6 February 1991	Sevilla FC	3–0	Cádiz CF	Seville
	Zamorano 38'; Polster 54'; Salguero 78'	Report (in Spanish)		Stadium: Ramón Sánchez Pizjuán; Referee: Juan Ansuátegui Roca

6 February 1991	CD Logroñés	0–0	Real Betis	Logroño
		Report (in Spanish)		Stadium: Las Gaunas; Attendance: 7,000; Referee: Rafael Díaz Agüero

7 February 1991	Real Madrid	1–1	Atlético Madrid	Madrid
	Hugo Sánchez 56'	Report (in Spanish)	Rodax 36'	Stadium: Santiago Bernabéu; Attendance: 60,000; Referee: Joaquín Ramos Marcos

17 February 1991	Elche CF	2–1	RCD Mallorca	Elche
	Jesús 4', 42'	Report (in Spanish)	Claudio 88'	Stadium: Estadio Manuel Martínez Valero; Attendance: 10,000; Referee: José Francisco Pérez Sánchez

=== Second leg ===
27 February 1991	Valencia CF	4–0	Deportivo La Coruña	Valencia
	Eloy 29', 64'; Penev 52', 85'	Report (in Spanish)		Stadium: Luis Casanova Stadium; Referee: José Manuel Andradas Asurmendi

27 February 1991	RCD Mallorca	3–1 (a.e.t.)	Elche CF	Palma de Mallorca
	Claudio 33', 72'; Vulić 115'	Report (in Spanish)	Gomis 90'	Stadium: Luís Sitjar; Attendance: 4,000; Referee: Manuel Vico Díaz

27 February 1991	Real Valladolid	2–0	RCD Español	Valladolid
	Ayarza 32'; Fonseca 68'	Report (in Spanish)		Stadium: José Zorrilla; Attendance: 5,000; Referee: José María García-Aranda

27 February 1991	FC Barcelona	6–0	UD Las Palmas	Barcelona
	Stoichkov 15' (pen.), 36'; Laudrup 21'; Salinas 32'; Eusebio 59'; Amor 75'	Report (in Spanish)		Stadium: Camp Nou; Attendance: 20,000; Referee: Juan Peraita Ibáñez

27 February 1991	Atlético Madrid	1–0	Real Madrid	Madrid
	Donato 55'	Report (in Spanish)		Stadium: Vicente Calderón; Attendance: 55,000; Referee: Juan Ansuátegui Roca

27 February 1991	Sporting Gijón	1–0	Real Sociedad	Gijón
	Luhový 63'	Report (in Spanish)		Stadium: El Molinón; Attendance: 13,000; Referee: Miguel Ángel Marín López

27 February 1991	Cádiz CF	0–3	Sevilla FC	Cádiz
		Report (in Spanish)	Miguelo 45'; Serrano 52'; Bengoechea 82' (pen.)	Stadium: Ramón de Carranza; Attendance: 10,000; Referee: Alfonso Pérez Cabeza

27 February 1991	Real Betis	0–2	CD Logroñés	Seville
		Report (in Spanish)	Salva 7'; Aguilá 76'	Stadium: Benito Villamarín; Referee: José Mauro Socorro González

== Quarter-finals ==
Team 1	Agg.	Team 2	1st leg	2nd leg
CD Logroñés	2–3 (aet)	Sporting Gijón	2–0	0–3
Sevilla FC	0–7	FC Barcelona	0–4	0–3
Valencia CF	2–3	RCD Mallorca	1–0	1–3
Real Valladolid	1–2	Atlético Madrid	0–2	1–0

=== First leg ===
12 June 1991	CD Logroñés	2–0	Sporting Gijón	Logroño
21:00	José María 56'; Aguilá 90'	Report (in Spanish)		Stadium: Las Gaunas; Attendance: 4,000; Referee: José María Enríquez Negreira (Catalonia)

12 June 1991	Sevilla FC	0–4	FC Barcelona	Seville
21:00		Report (in Spanish)	Bakero 6'; Laudrup 12'; Herrero (o.g.) 25'; Eusebio 81'	Stadium: Ramón Sánchez Pizjuán Stadium; Attendance: 20,000; Referee: Raúl García De Loza (Galicia (Spain))

12 June 1991	Valencia CF	1–0	RCD Mallorca	Valencia
21:00	Roberto 69'	Report (in Spanish)		Stadium: Luis Casanova Stadium; Attendance: 30,000; Referee: José Enrique Rubio Valdivieso (Castile and León)

13 June 1991	Real Valladolid	0–2	Atlético Madrid	Valladolid
20:30		Report (in Spanish)	Juanito 13'; Schuster 28'	Stadium: Estadio José Zorrilla; Attendance: 12,000; Referee: José Luis Pajares Paz (Extremadura)

=== Second leg ===
15 June 1991	FC Barcelona	3–0	Sevilla FC	Barcelona
21:00	Koeman 59'; Eusebio 78'; Salinas 87'	Report (in Spanish)		Stadium: Camp Nou; Attendance: 25,000; Referee: José María García-Aranda (Community of Madrid)

16 June 1991	Sporting Gijón	3–0 (a.e.t.)	CD Logroñés	Gijón
19:30	Luis Enrique 15', 118'; Alcázar 80'	Report (in Spanish)		Stadium: El Molinón; Attendance: 25,000; Referee: Joaquín Urío Velázquez (Basque Country (autonomous community))

16 June 1991	RCD Mallorca	3–1	Valencia CF	Palma de Mallorca
20:00	Claudio 15'; Nadal 43'; Del Campo 60'	Report (in Spanish)	Penev 37'	Stadium: Lluís Sitjar; Attendance: 20,000; Referee: Antonio Jesús López Nieto (Andalusia)

16 June 1991	Atlético Madrid	0–1	Real Valladolid	Madrid
21:00		Report (in Spanish)	Fonseca 81' (p.)	Stadium: Vicente Calderón; Attendance: 35,000; Referee: José Merino González (Canary Islands)

== Semi-finals ==
Team 1	Agg.	Team 2	1st leg	2nd leg
FC Barcelona	3–4	Atlético de Madrid	0–2	3–2
Sporting Gijón	0–2	RCD Mallorca	0–1	0–1

=== First leg ===
19 June 1991	Sporting Gijón	0–1	RCD Mallorca	Gijón
21:00		Report (in Spanish)	Hassan Nader 33'	Stadium: El Molinón; Attendance: 30,000; Referee: José Francisco Pérez Sánchez

20 June 1991	FC Barcelona	0–2	Atlético de Madrid	Barcelona
21:00		Report (in Spanish)	Futre 35'; Manolo 60'	Stadium: Camp Nou; Attendance: 55,000; Referee: Teodoro Valdés Sánchez

=== Second leg ===
23 June 1991	Atlético de Madrid	2–3	FC Barcelona	Madrid
	Patxi Ferreira 44'; Manolo 77'	Report (in Spanish)	Julio Salinas 19', 27'; Koeman 70'	Stadium: Vicente Calderón; Attendance: 30,000; Referee: Ansuátegui Roca (Valencian Community)

23 June 1991	RCD Mallorca	1–0	Sporting Gijón	Palma de Mallorca
	Álvaro 90'	Report (in Spanish)		Stadium: Luis Sitjar; Attendance: 25,000; Referee: Brito Arceo (Canary Islands)

== Final ==
Team 1	Score	Team 2
Club Atlético de Madrid	1–0 (aet)	RCD Mallorca

Copa del Rey

1990–91 winners

Club Atlético de Madrid
