= 1989–90 European Cup Winners' Cup =

Tournament details
- Dates: 16 August 1989 – 9 May 1990
- Teams: 32 (first round); 33 (qualifying)

Final positions
- Champions: (Italy) Sampdoria (1st title)
- Runners-up: (Belgium) Anderlecht

Tournament statistics
- Matches played: 63
- Goals scored: 165 (2.62 per match)
- Attendance: 1,006,432 (15,975 per match)
- Top scorer(s): Gianluca Vialli (Sampdoria); 7 goals

The 1989–90 season of the European Cup Winners' Cup was won for the only time by Sampdoria in the final against Anderlecht, 2–0 at Nya Ullevi in Gothenburg, on 9 May 1990. They went on to win 1990–91 Serie A, also being runners-up in the 1991–92 European Cup and in the 1988–89 European Cup Winners' Cup. English clubs were still banned from Europe following the Heysel Stadium disaster, meaning Liverpool missed out on a place, but would have a representative again the following season.

== Preliminary round ==
Team 1	Agg.	Team 2	1st leg	2nd leg
Chernomorets (Bulgaria)	3–5	(Albania) Dinamo Tirana	3–1	0–4

=== First leg ===
16 August 1989

Chernomorets (Bulgaria)	3–1	(Albania) Dinamo Tirana
Petkov 25'; V. Stoyanov 53'; Pumpalov 71' (pen.)	Report	Demollari 69'

Deveti Septemvri, Burgas
Attendance: 8,124
Referee: Roman Steindl (Austria)

=== Second leg ===
30 August 1989

Dinamo Tirana (Albania)	4–0	(Bulgaria) Chernomorets
Canaj 46'; Abazi 62'; Jançe 68'; Demollari 71'	Report

Qemal Stafa Stadium, Tirana
Attendance: 7,949
Referee: Sándor Puhl (Hungary)

Dinamo Tirana won 5–3 on aggregate.

== First round ==
Team 1	Agg.	Team 2	1st leg	2nd leg
Real Valladolid (Spain)	6–0	(Malta) Ħamrun Spartans	5–0	1–0
Union Luxembourg	0–5	(Sweden) Djurgården	0–0	0–5
Belenenses (Portugal)	1–4	(France) Monaco	1–1	0–3
Valur (Iceland)	2–4	(East Germany) BFC Dynamo	1–2	1–2
Beşiktaş (Turkey)	1–3	(West Germany) Borussia Dortmund	0–1	1–2
Brann (Norway)	0–3	(Italy) Sampdoria	0–2	0–1
Torpedo Moscow (Soviet Union)	6–0	(Republic of Ireland) Cork City	5–0	1–0
Slovan Bratislava (Czechoslovakia)	3–4	(Switzerland) Grasshopper	3–0	0–4 (aet)
Anderlecht (Belgium)	10–0	(Northern Ireland) Ballymena United	6–0	4–0
Barcelona (Spain)	2–1	(Poland) Legia Warsaw	1–1	1–0
Admira Wacker (Austria)	3–1	(Cyprus) AEL	3–0	0–1
Ferencváros (Hungary)	6–2	(Finland) Haka	5–1	1–1
Panathinaikos (Greece)	6–5	(Wales) Swansea City	3–2	3–3
Dinamo Tirana (Albania)	1–2	(Romania) Dinamo București	1–0	0–2
Groningen (Netherlands)	3–1	(Denmark) Ikast	1–0	2–1
Partizan (Socialist Federal Republic of Yugoslavia)	6–6 (a)	(Scotland) Celtic	2–1^{1}	4–5

- ^{1} The first leg of the Partizan—Celtic tie was played at Bijeli Brijeg Stadium in Mostar instead of FK Partizan's home ground in Belgrade due to the club being punished by UEFA as a result of crowd trouble during their 1988–89 UEFA Cup second round first leg match vs AS Roma. Part of the punishment for FK Partizan was playing home matches at least 300 km away from home.

=== First leg ===
12 September 1989

Real Valladolid (Spain)	5–0	(Malta) Ħamrun Spartans
Albis 22', 70'; Valverde 38', 46'; Ayarza 59'	Report

Estadio José Zorrilla, Valladolid
Attendance: 8,116
Referee: Vítor Fernandes Correia (Portugal)

12 September 1989

Union Luxembourg	0–0	(Sweden) Djurgården
	Report

Stade Achille Hammerel, Luxembourg
Attendance: 429
Referee: Jaap Uilenberg (Netherlands)

12 September 1989

Belenenses (Portugal)	1–1	(France) Monaco
Chiquinho Conde 55'	Report	Díaz 70'

Estádio do Restelo, Lisbon
Attendance: 6,200
Referee: Ignace van Swieten (Netherlands)

12 September 1989

Slovan Bratislava (Czechoslovakia)	3–0	(Switzerland) Grasshopper
Timko 35'; Vankovič 53' (pen.); Tittel 88' (pen.)	Report

Tehelné pole, Bratislava
Attendance: 12,817
Referee: Sadık Deda (Turkey)

12 September 1989

Ferencváros (Hungary)	5–1	(Finland) Haka
Kincses 1'; Limperger 10'; Szeibert 29', 64'; Dzurják 80'	Report	Paavola 4'

Üllői úti Stadion, Budapest
Attendance: 15,865
Referee: İhsan Türe (Turkey)

12 September 1989

Partizan (Socialist Federal Republic of Yugoslavia)	2–1	(Scotland) Celtic
Milojević 21'; Đurđević 55'	Report	Galloway 42'

Stadion pod Bijelim Brijegom, Mostar
Attendance: 8,716
Referee: Helmut Kohl (Austria)

13 September 1989

Valur (Iceland)	1–2	(East Germany) BFC Dynamo
Áskelsson 37'	Report	Bonan 70'; Thom 75'

Laugardalsvöllur, Reykjavík
Attendance: 510
Referee: John Purcell (Republic of Ireland)

13 September 1989

Beşiktaş (Turkey)	0–1	(West Germany) Borussia Dortmund
	Report	Mill 13'

İnönü Stadium, Istanbul
Attendance: 13,635
Referee: Kenny Hope (Scotland)

13 September 1989

Brann (Norway)	0–2	(Italy) Sampdoria
	Report	Vialli 40'; Mancini 55'

Brann Stadion, Bergen
Attendance: 16,789
Referee: Bill Crombie (Scotland)

13 September 1989

Torpedo Moscow (Soviet Union)	5–0	(Republic of Ireland) Cork City
Grechnyov 24', 40' (pen.); Y. Savichev 27'; Chugunov 34'; Afanasyev 72'	Report

Torpedo Stadium, Moscow
Attendance: 4,050
Referee: Ion Crăciunescu (Romania)

13 September 1989

Anderlecht (Belgium)	6–0	(Northern Ireland) Ballymena United
Ukkonen 11'; Nilis 16', 35'; Van Der Linden 47', 52'; Guðjohnsen 85'	Report

Constant Vanden Stock Stadium, Brussels
Attendance: 2,824
Referee: Thorodd Presberg (Norway)

13 September 1989

Barcelona (Spain)	1–1	(Poland) Legia Warsaw
Koeman 85' (pen.)	Report	Łatka 25'

Camp Nou, Barcelona
Attendance: 30,000
Referee: Rolf Blattmann (Switzerland)

13 September 1989

Admira Wacker (Austria)	3–0	(Cyprus) AEL
Schaub 80'; Walter Knaller 86'; Rodax 89'	Report

Bundesstadion Südstadt, Maria Enzersdorf
Attendance: 1,500
Referee: Adrian Porumboiu (Romania)

13 September 1989

Panathinaikos (Greece)	3–2	(Wales) Swansea City
Vlachos 4', 53'; Saravakos 38'	Report	Raynor 63'; Salako 80'

O.A.K.A., Athens
Attendance: 42,700
Referee: Lajos Németh (Hungary)

13 September 1989

Dinamo Tirana (Albania)	1–0	(Romania) Dinamo București
Canaj 52'	Report

Qemal Stafa Stadium, Tirana
Attendance: 13,000
Referee: Tadeusz Diakonowicz (Poland)

13 September 1989

Groningen (Netherlands)	1–0	(Denmark) Ikast
Koevermans 49'	Report

Stadion Oosterpark, Groningen
Attendance: 9,612
Referee: Oliver Donnelly (Northern Ireland)

=== Second leg ===
26 September 1989

Ħamrun Spartans (Malta)	0–1	(Spain) Real Valladolid
	Report	Hidalgo 37'

Ta' Qali, Attard
Attendance: 1,188
Referee: Pierluigi Magni (Italy)

Real Valladolid won 6–0 on aggregate.

26 September 1989

Monaco (France)	3–0	(Portugal) Belenenses
Weah 30', 35'; Mège 40'	Report

Stade Louis II, Monaco
Attendance: 7,480
Referee: Manfred Roßner (East Germany)

Monaco won 4–1 on aggregate.

26 September 1989

BFC Dynamo (East Germany)	2–1	(Iceland) Valur
Ernst 25'; Lenz 83'	Report	Kristjánsson 53'

Friedrich-Ludwig-Jahn-Sportpark, East Berlin
Attendance: 9,500
Referee: Jan Damgaard (Denmark)

BFC Dynamo won 4–2 on aggregate.

26 September 1989

Borussia Dortmund (West Germany)	2–1	(Turkey) Beşiktaş
Driller 11'; Wegmann 85'	Report	Ali 76'

Westfalenstadion, Dortmund
Attendance: 43,000
Referee: John Blankenstein (Netherlands)

Borussia Dortmund won 3–1 on aggregate.

26 September 1989

Sampdoria (Italy)	1–0	(Norway) Brann
Katanec 75'	Report

Stadio Luigi Ferraris, Genoa
Attendance: 9,460
Referee: Borislav Aleksandrov (Bulgaria)

Sampdoria won 3–0 on aggregate.

26 September 1989

Cork City (Republic of Ireland)	0–1	(Soviet Union) Torpedo Moscow
	Report	Y. Savichev 12'

Turners Cross, Cork
Attendance: 2,560
Referee: Jean-Marie Lartigot (France)

Torpedo Moscow won 6–0 on aggregate.

26 September 1989

Grasshopper (Switzerland)	4–0 (a.e.t.)	(Czechoslovakia) Slovan Bratislava
Gren 10', 115'; Egli 59' (pen.); Strudal 84'	Report

Hardturm, Zürich
Attendance: 3,100
Referee: Günther Habermann (East Germany)

Grasshopper won 4–3 on aggregate.

26 September 1989

Ballymena United (Northern Ireland)	0–4	(Belgium) Anderlecht
	Report	Vervoort 27', 87'; Degryse 54'; Guðjohnsen 83'

Ballymena Showgrounds, Ballymena
Attendance: 2,100
Referee: Eyjólfur Ólafsson (Iceland)

Anderlecht won 10–0 on aggregate.

26 September 1989

Legia Warsaw (Poland)	0–1	(Spain) Barcelona
	Report	Laudrup 11'

Stadion Wojska Polskiego, Warsaw
Attendance: 17,000
Referee: Heinz Holzmann (Austria)

Barcelona won 2–1 on aggregate.

26 September 1989

AEL (Cyprus)	1–0	(Austria) Admira Wacker
Sofokleous 43'	Report

Tsirio Stadium, Limassol
Attendance: 2,785
Referee: Mateo Beusan (Yugoslavia)

Admira Wacker won 3–1 on aggregate.

26 September 1989

Swansea City (Wales)	3–3	(Greece) Panathinaikos
James 31' (pen.); Melville 46', 66'	Report	Dimopoulos 50'; Saravakos 71' (pen.), 89'

Vetch Field, Swansea
Attendance: 8,276
Referee: Henning Lund-Sørensen (Denmark)

Panathinaikos won 6–5 on aggregate.

26 September 1989

Dinamo București (Romania)	2–0	(Albania) Dinamo Tirana
Mateuț 8'; Mihăescu 13'	Report

Stadionul Dinamo, Bucharest
Attendance: 17,000
Referee: Zoran Petrović (Yugoslavia)

Dinamo București won 2–1 on aggregate.

26 September 1989

Ikast (Denmark)	1–2	(Netherlands) Groningen
Kristensen 83' (pen.)	Report	Meijer 35'; Eijkelkamp 70'

Ikast Stadion, Ikast
Attendance: 3,639
Referee: Egil Nervik (Norway)

Groningen won 3–1 on aggregate.

27 September 1989

Djurgården (Sweden)	5–0	Union Luxembourg
Martinsson 54', 85'; Nilsson 60'; Galloway 80', 90'	Report

Råsunda, Solna
Attendance: 1,180
Referee: Timo Keltanen (Finland)

Djurgården won 5–0 on aggregate.

27 September 1989

Haka (Finland)	1–1	(Hungary) Ferencváros
Paavola 75'	Report	Keller 47'

Tehtaan kenttä, Valkeakoski
Attendance: 503
Referee: Bo Helén (Sweden)

Ferencváros won 6–2 on aggregate.

27 September 1989

Celtic (Scotland)	5–4	(Socialist Federal Republic of Yugoslavia) Partizan
Dziekanowski 25', 47', 55', 80'; Walker 65'	Report	Vujačić 8'; Đorđević 50'; Ǵurovski 61'; Šćepović 86'

Celtic Park, Glasgow
Attendance: 45,298
Referee: Klaus Peschel (East Germany)

6–6 on aggregate; Partizan won on away goals.

== Second round ==
Team 1	Agg.	Team 2	1st leg	2nd leg
Real Valladolid (Spain)	4–2	(Sweden) Djurgården	2–0	2–2
Monaco (France)	1–1 (a)	(East Germany) BFC Dynamo	0–0	1–1
Borussia Dortmund (West Germany)	1–3	(Italy) Sampdoria	1–1	0–2
Torpedo Moscow (Soviet Union)	1–4	(Switzerland) Grasshopper	1–1	0–3
Anderlecht (Belgium)	3–2	(Spain) Barcelona	2–0	1–2
Admira Wacker (Austria)	2–0	(Hungary) Ferencváros	1–0	1–0
Panathinaikos (Greece)	1–8	(Romania) Dinamo București	0–2	1–6
Groningen (Netherlands)	5–6	(Socialist Federal Republic of Yugoslavia) Partizan	4–3	1–3

=== First leg ===
17 October 1989

Monaco (France)	0–0	(East Germany) BFC Dynamo
	Report

Stade Louis II, Monaco
Attendance: 6,648
Referee: Hubert Forstinger (Austria)

17 October 1989

Borussia Dortmund (West Germany)	1–1	(Italy) Sampdoria
Wegmann 64'	Report	Mancini 88'

Westfalenstadion, Dortmund
Attendance: 45,560
Referee: Alexey Spirin (Soviet Union)

18 October 1989

Real Valladolid (Spain)	2–0	(Sweden) Djurgården
Kullberg 30' (o.g.); Moya 33'	Report

Estadio José Zorrilla, Valladolid
Attendance: 23,236
Referee: Bruno Galler (Switzerland)

18 October 1989

Torpedo Moscow (Soviet Union)	1–1	(Switzerland) Grasshopper
Y. Savichev 29'	Report	Strudal 88'

Torpedo Stadium, Moscow
Attendance: 4,900
Referee: Timo Keltanen (Finland)

18 October 1989

Anderlecht (Belgium)	2–0	(Spain) Barcelona
Janković 12'; Degryse 46'	Report

Constant Vanden Stock Stadium, Brussels
Attendance: 25,000
Referee: Erik Fredriksson (Sweden)

18 October 1989

Admira Wacker (Austria)	1–0	(Hungary) Ferencváros
Rodax 88'	Report

Bundesstadion Südstadt, Maria Enzersdorf
Attendance: 6,000
Referee: Ignace van Swieten (Netherlands)

18 October 1989

Panathinaikos (Greece)	0–2	(Romania) Dinamo București
	Report	Răducioiu 57'; Mateuț 66'

O.A.K.A., Athens
Attendance: 38,444
Referee: Dieter Pauly (West Germany)

18 October 1989

Groningen (Netherlands)	4–3	(Socialist Federal Republic of Yugoslavia) Partizan
Meijer 16' ten Caat 35'; Roossien 48'; Koevermans 74'	Report	Milorad Bajović 32'; Ǵurovski 45', 83'

Stadion Oosterpark, Groningen
Attendance: 10,115
Referee: Henning Lund-Sørensen (Denmark)

=== Second leg ===
1 November 1989

Djurgården (Sweden)	2–2	(Spain) Real Valladolid
Skoog 41'; Martinsson 55'	Report	Alberto 65', 72'

Råsunda, Solna
Attendance: 3,166
Referee: Manfred Roßner (East Germany)

Real Valladolid won 4–2 on aggregate.

1 November 1989

BFC Dynamo (East Germany)	1–1 (a.e.t.)	(France) Monaco
Küttner 110'	Report	Díaz 117'

Friedrich-Ludwig-Jahn-Sportpark, East Berlin
Attendance: 16,250
Referee: Guy Goethals (Belgium)

1–1 on aggregate; Monaco won on away goals.

1 November 1989

Sampdoria (Italy)	2–0	(West Germany) Borussia Dortmund
Vialli 74' (pen.), 88'	Report

Stadio Luigi Ferraris, Genoa
Attendance: 32,683
Referee: Marcel Van Langenhove (Belgium)

Sampdoria won 3–1 on aggregate.

1 November 1989

Grasshopper (Switzerland)	3–0	(Soviet Union) Torpedo Moscow
Egli 33'; Wiederkehr 35'; Gren 79'	Report

Hardturm, Zürich
Attendance: 12,000
Referee: Kenny Hope (Scotland)

Grasshopper won 4–1 on aggregate.

1 November 1989

Barcelona (Spain)	2–1 (a.e.t.)	(Belgium) Anderlecht
Salinas 50'; Begiristain 56'	Report	Van Der Linden 97'

Camp Nou, Barcelona
Attendance: 86,159
Referee: Luigi Agnolin (Italy)

Anderlecht won 3–2 on aggregate.

1 November 1989

Ferencváros (Hungary)	0–1	(Austria) Admira Wacker
	Report	Oberhofer 48'

Felső Tisza-parti Stadion, Szeged
Attendance: 17,000
Referee: Wolf-Günter Wiesel (West Germany)

Admira Wacker won 2–0 on aggregate.

1 November 1989

Dinamo București (Romania)	6–1	(Greece) Panathinaikos
Rednic 21'; Mateuț 31', 48'; Sabău 40', 50'; Klein 89'	Report	Samaras 34'

Stadionul Dinamo, Bucharest
Attendance: 16,000
Referee: Kurt Röthlisberger (Switzerland)

Dinamo București won 8–1 on aggregate.

1 November 1989

Partizan (Socialist Federal Republic of Yugoslavia)	3–1	(Netherlands) Groningen
Ǵurovski 16'; Milojević 83'; Đurđević 90'	Report	ten Caat 80'

Stadion JNA, Belgrade
Attendance: 42,517
Referee: Karl-Heinz Tritschler (West Germany)

Partizan won 6–5 on aggregate.

== Quarter-finals ==
Team 1	Agg.	Team 2	1st leg	2nd leg
Real Valladolid (Spain)	0–0 (1–3 p)	(France) Monaco	0–0	0–0 (aet)
Sampdoria (Italy)	4–1	(Switzerland) Grasshopper	2–0	2–1
Anderlecht (Belgium)	3–1	(Austria) Admira Wacker	2–0	1–1
Dinamo București (Romania)	4–1	(Socialist Federal Republic of Yugoslavia) Partizan	2–1	2–0^{1}

Notes

- 1: The return leg of the Dinamo București—Partizan tie was played at the Pod Goricom Stadium in Titograd instead of Partizan's home ground in Belgrade since UEFA barred Partizan again from playing home matches within a 300 km radius of their home ground after more crowd trouble in the previous round's home tie vs FC Groningen.

=== First leg ===
6 March 1990

Anderlecht (Belgium)	2–0	(Austria) Admira Wacker
Degryse 32', 37'	Report

Constant Vanden Stock Stadium, Brussels
Attendance: 12,000
Referee: Klaus Peschel (East Germany)

7 March 1990

Real Valladolid (Spain)	0–0	(France) Monaco
	Report

Estadio José Zorrilla, Valladolid
Attendance: 12,317
Referee: Pietro D'Elia (Italy)

7 March 1990

Sampdoria (Italy)	2–0	(Switzerland) Grasshopper
Vierchowod 13'; Meier 84' (o.g.)	Report

Stadio Luigi Ferraris, Genoa
Attendance: 31,323
Referee: Peter Mikkelsen (Denmark)

7 March 1990

Dinamo București (Romania)	2–1	(Socialist Federal Republic of Yugoslavia) Partizan
Răducioiu 18', 57'	Report	Spasić 68'

Stadionul Dinamo, Bucharest
Attendance: 18,000
Referee: Dušan Krchňák (Czechoslovakia)

=== Second leg ===
20 March 1990

Monaco (France)	0–0 (a.e.t.)	(Spain) Real Valladolid
	Report
Penalties
Díaz (penalty scored); Touré (penalty missed); Fofana (penalty scored); Petit (penalty scored)	3–1	(penalty missed) Janković; (penalty scored) Albis; (penalty missed) Moya; (penalty missed) Ayarza

Stade Louis II, Monaco
Attendance: 11,301
Referee: Wolf-Günter Wiesel (West Germany)

0–0 on aggregate; Monaco won 3–1 on penalties.

21 March 1990

Admira Wacker (Austria)	1–1	(Belgium) Anderlecht
Rodax 65'	Report	Nilis 57'

Bundesstadion Südstadt, Maria Enzersdorf
Attendance: 4,500
Referee: Alexey Spirin (Soviet Union)

Anderlecht won 3–1 on aggregate.

21 March 1990

Partizan (Socialist Federal Republic of Yugoslavia)	0–2	(Romania) Dinamo București
	Report	Lupescu 53'; Răducioiu 70'

Stadion pod Goricom, Titograd
Attendance: 9,000
Referee: José Rosa dos Santos (Portugal)

Dinamo București won 4–1 on aggregate.

22 March 1990

Grasshopper (Switzerland)	1–2	(Italy) Sampdoria
Wyss 67'	Report	Toninho Cerezo 43'; Lombardo 81'

Hardturm, Zürich
Attendance: 28,700
Referee: Zoran Petrović (Yugoslavia)

Sampdoria won 4–1 on aggregate.

== Semi-finals ==
Team 1	Agg.	Team 2	1st leg	2nd leg
Monaco (France)	2–4	(Italy) Sampdoria	2–2	0–2
Anderlecht (Belgium)	2–0	(Romania) Dinamo București	1–0	1–0

=== First leg ===
3 April 1990

Monaco (France)	2–2	(Italy) Sampdoria
Weah 44'; Díaz 81'	Report	Vialli 75' (pen.), 78'

Stade Louis II, Monaco
Attendance: 16,966
Referee: Siegfried Kirschen (East Germany)

4 April 1990

Anderlecht (Belgium)	1–0	(Romania) Dinamo București
Nilis 66'	Report

Constant Vanden Stock Stadium, Brussels
Attendance: 16,000
Referee: Aron Schmidhuber (West Germany)

=== Second leg ===
18 April 1990

Sampdoria (Italy)	2–0	(France) Monaco
Vierchowod 9'; Lombardo 12'	Report

Stadio Luigi Ferraris, Genoa
Attendance: 35,577
Referee: José Rosa dos Santos (Portugal)

Sampdoria won 4–2 on aggregate.

18 April 1990

Dinamo București (Romania)	0–1	(Belgium) Anderlecht
	Report	Van Der Linden 60'

Stadionul August 23, Bucharest
Attendance: 70,000
Referee: John Blankenstein (Netherlands)

Anderlecht won 2–0 on aggregate.

== Final ==
9 May 1990
20:15

Sampdoria (Italy)	2–0 (a.e.t.)	(Belgium) Anderlecht
Vialli 105', 107'	Report

Ullevi, Gothenburg
Attendance: 20,103
Referee: Bruno Galler (Switzerland)

== Top scorers ==
The top scorers from the 1989–90 UEFA Cup Winners' Cup are as follows:

Rank	Name	Team	Goals
1	(Italy) Gianluca Vialli	(Italy) Sampdoria	7
2	(Belgium) Marc Degryse	(Belgium) Anderlecht	4
2	(Socialist Federal Republic of Yugoslavia) Milko Đurovski	(Socialist Federal Republic of Yugoslavia) Partizan	4
2	(Belgium) Marc Van Der Linden	(Belgium) Anderlecht	4
2	(Romania) Dorin Mateuţ	(Romania) Dinamo București	4
2	(Belgium) Luc Nilis	(Belgium) Anderlecht	4
2	(Romania) Florin Răducioiu	(Romania) Dinamo București	4
2	(Poland) Dariusz Dziekanowski	(Scotland) Celtic	4
9	(Argentina) Ramón Díaz	(France) Monaco	3
9	(Sweden) Mats Gren	(Switzerland) Grasshopper	3
9	(Sweden) Mikael Martinsson	(Sweden) Djurgården	3
9	(Austria) Gerhard Rodax	(Austria) Admira Wacker	3
9	(Greece) Dimitris Saravakos	(Greece) Panathinaikos	3
9	(Soviet Union) Yuri Savichev	(Soviet Union) Torpedo Moscow	3
9	(Liberia) George Weah	(France) Monaco	3

== See also ==
- 1989–90 European Cup
- 1989–90 UEFA Cup
