= Alberto López (footballer, born 1967) =

Spanish footballer

Alberto
Personal information
- Full name: Alberto López Moreno
- Date of birth: 25 February 1967 (age 59)
- Place of birth: Madrid, Spain
- Height: 1.81 m (5 ft 11 in)
- Position: Forward

Senior career*
| Years | Team | Apps | (Gls) |
- Moscardó
| 1988–1995 | Valladolid | 175 | (44) |
| 1988 | → Burgos (loan) | 6 | (3) |
| 1995–1998 | Racing Santander | 85 | (18) |
| 1998–2001 | Valladolid | 81 | (10) |
| 2001–2002 | Numancia | 31 | (4) |
| 2002–2003 | Palencia | | |
| Total | | 378+ | (78+) |

International career
| 1989 | Spain U21 | 2 | (0) |
- * Club domestic league appearances and goals

Alberto López Moreno (born 25 February 1967), also known as Alberto while a player, is a Spanish former footballer who played as a forward.

He spent most of his career with Real Valladolid, playing 295 games over all competitions and scoring 72 goals. He totalled 311 games and 58 goals in La Liga, where he also represented Racing Santander.

A medical graduate, he returned to Real Valladolid as the club doctor after retiring from football.

== Club career ==
Born in Madrid, Alberto began his career at local CDC Moscardó. In December 1986, the forward, who idolised the direct play of Denmark international Preben Elkjær, signed for La Liga club Real Valladolid. He was loaned to Burgos CF in the Segunda División for 1987–88.

Alberto made his top-flight debut for Real Valladolid on 20 November 1988, as a 74th-minute substitute for Enrique Moreno in a 2–1 loss away to Real Murcia. Fifteen days later, in his third match, he scored the only goal of a home win over Athletic Bilbao, and the following weekend he scored twice in a 4–2 win at Sevilla FC. This brace was scored against Soviet international Rinat Dasayev, one of the most renowned goalkeepers of the era; Alberto said that manager Vicente Cantatore, who had built a squad of young players, convinced him not to fear the opponent.

In his first season at the first season at Valladolid, Alberto scored 10 goals, including 3 in a run to the Copa del Rey final. He was not chosen for the decisive game, a 1–0 loss to Real Madrid, and expressed in 2008 that he never understood why. He followed cup run with his sole European campaign, reaching the quarter-finals of the UEFA Cup Winners' Cup in 1989–90. He scored two late goals in a 2–2 draw away to Djurgårdens IF of Sweden on 1 November in the second leg of the last 16, making putting his team through 4–2 on aggregate.

In 1991–92, a Valladolid side that had already lost key player Fernando Hierro to Real Madrid and manager Vicente Cantatore to Sevilla FC suffered relegation and ended its longest La Liga streak of 12 seasons. Alberto scored 19 goals in the following season, including 14 in the league as Pucela won promotion.

In July 1995, Alberto moved to Racing Santander on a three-year deal, for an estimated fee of 65 million Spanish pesetas (around £340,000). He to Valladolid at its expiration. Aided by his experience despite with less pace than before, he remained at the club until 2001, closing out his career with two sides also in Castile and León: CD Numancia of the second tier and Palencia CF in the Tercera División.

== International career ==
López played two games for the Spain under-21 team in 1989. On 31 May he debuted in a 1–0 win over Cyprus in Mérida, and on 14 November he scored the only goal against Hungary in Benidorm, both in European qualifiers and the latter ensuring a ticket to the 1990 UEFA European Under-21 Championship.

== Personal life ==
As of July 2005 and May 2009, López was the secretary general of the Spanish Footballers' Association (AFE).

López began studying medicine while at Moscardó, and combined his studies with a professional career after signing for Real Valladolid. He qualifyied as a doctor after leaving the game, and returned to the as part of the medical staff. He served as part of the medical committee of FIFPro, the worldwide trade union of footballers, as well as UEFA's anti-doping panel.

In December 2023, Real Valladolid stated that López was taking leave due to illness. He returned five months later after recovering from hairy cell leukaemia.
