= Gonzalo Arguiñano =

Spanish footballer

Personal information
- Full name: Gonzalo Arguiñano Elezkano
- Date of birth: 12 August 1962 (age 64)
- Place of birth: Lemoa, Spain
- Height: 1.86 m (6 ft 1 in)
- Position: Centre back

Senior career*
Years	Team	Apps	(Gls)
1980–1984	Lemona	99	(14)
1984–1987	Sestao River	96	(2)
1987–1990	Valladolid	96	(3)
1990–1992	Real Burgos	20	(0)
1992–1995	Lleida	94	(3)
1995–1996	Hércules	33	(0)
1996–1997	Albacete	13	(0)
Total		451	(22)
- * Club domestic league appearances and goals

Gonzalo Arguiñano Elezkano (born 12 August 1962), known simply as Gonzalo, is a Spanish former footballer who played as a central defender.

He played 148 games and scored 4 goals in La Liga for Real Valladolid, Real Burgos and Lleida, and also featured in the Copa del Rey final for the first of those clubs in 1989. He added 185 games and 4 goals in Segunda División for Sestao River, Lleida, Hércules and Albacete, winning promotion as champions with the second and third of those clubs in the 1990s.

== Career ==
=== Early career ===
Born in Lemoa in the Basque Country, Gonzalo played for his hometown club SD Lemona in the Tercera División before joining Sestao River in 1984. The club won promotion to the Segunda División, and their division's Copa de la Liga, in his first season. In 1985–86, he played alongside the likes of José Luis Mendilibar and Ernesto Valverde as the club finished 10th in the second tier.

=== Real Valladolid ===
In July 1987, Gonzalo transferred to Real Valladolid for a fee of 10 million Spanish pesetas, signing a three-year deal with an annual salary of 6 million. He chose the club over fellow La Liga team Real Betis. He made his debut as the season began on 30 August, playing the final 23 minutes as a substitute for striker Gregorio Fonseca in a goalless draw away to Sporting de Gijón. He scored the decisive goal of a 2–1 home win over Valencia on 6 March 1988, and netted again three weeks later in a 2–0 victory against Mallorca at the Estadio José Zorrilla.

Gonzalo played regularly for La Pucela under manager Vicente Cantatore, with his colleagues in defence including brothers Fernando and Manolo Hierro. On 30 June 1989 he played the final of the Copa del Rey, losing 1–0 to Real Madrid. As the club from the capital city had already qualified for the European Cup as league winners, Valladolid entered the UEFA Cup Winners' Cup and reached the quarter-finals before a penalty shootout defeat to AS Monaco at the Stade Louis II.

=== Later career ===
In June 1990, Gonzalo remained in the top flight and in Castile and León, moving for free to newly promoted Real Burgos. After taking no part in the 1991–92 La Liga, he joined Lleida in the second tier. He helped the Catalan club to promotion as champions in his first season, and called his three-year spell one of the best of his career due to it reestablishing his form.

Gonzalo turned down a contract renewal and joined Hércules in July 1995. He again won promotion to the top flight as champion in his only season, being released in June 1996, and moving on to Albacete in the Segunda División.

== Personal life ==
After retiring as a player, Gonzalo worked as a sports agent. In 2003, he represented the interests of Betis player Joaquín. In 2024, he was employed by Real Ávila.
