= Arguiñano =

Arguiñano is a Basque language surname. Notable people with the surname include:

- Eva Arguiñano (born 1960), Spanish chef and television presenter
- Karlos Arguiñano (born 1948), Spanish chef and television presenter, brother of Eva
- Gonzalo Arguiñano (born 1962), Spanish footballer
- Zubiarraín (1945–1993), Spanish footballer, full name Jesús María Zubiarraín Arguiñano
