= José Lemos (footballer) =

Spanish footballer (1962–2023)

Personal information
- Full name: José Lemos Rodríguez
- Date of birth: 1 February 1962
- Place of birth: Salvaterra de Miño, Spain
- Date of death: 21 September 2023 (aged 61)
- Place of death: Vigo, Spain
- Height: 1.75 m (5 ft 9 in)
- Position: Right-back

Senior career*
Years	Team	Apps	(Gls)
- Gran Peña
1979–1986	Celta Vigo	181	(1)
1986–1992	Valladolid	165	(2)
Total		346+	(4+)
- * Club domestic league appearances and goals

José Lemos Rodríguez (1 February 1962 – 21 September 2023) was a Spanish footballer who played as a right-back.

He began his career at Celta Vigo, winning two consecutive promotions from the Segunda División B to La Liga, and played six top-flight seasons at Valladolid, where he was a Copa del Rey finalist in 1989. He totalled 215 La Liga games between the two teams.

== Career ==
=== Celta Vigo ===
Born in Salvaterra de Miño in the Province of Pontevedra, Lemos played for Gran Peña Celtista before joining Celta Vigo. He made his debut in the Segunda División on 14 October 1979 in a 1–0 loss at Castellón and totalled 22 appearances in a season that ended with relegation, scoring once on 4 November at the end of a 4–0 home win over Getafe Deportivo.

Under manager Milorad Pavić, Celta won the Segunda División B and the second tier in consecutive seasons to reach La Liga in 1982. Lemos played 28 games in his first season in the division, scoring once as consolation in a 4–1 loss at Osasuna on 10 April 1983, as his team were relegated. He was still at the club in 1985–86, when they returned to the top flight.

=== Real Valladolid ===
In June 1986, Lemos paid 3 million Spanish pesetas (roughly $20,000) to free himself from his contract at Celta and sign a three-year deal at fellow top-flight club Real Valladolid. His new salary was 3.5 million pesetas a year.

On 16 October 1988, Lemos was sent off in a home loss to Real Madrid for arguing with the referee after Emilio Butragueño won a penalty kick, scored by Hugo Sánchez for the only goal of the game. Lemos played the Copa del Rey final against the same team on 30 June, losing again by a single goal.

Lemos played 197 total games for Valladolid, scoring two goals. The first came on 26 November 1989 in a 3–1 win over Athletic Bilbao at the Estadio José Zorrilla. He left the relegated club in 1992, at the end of his contract.

== Personal life ==
Lemos was the uncle and godfather of Claudio Giráldez. Also a defender, he later managed Celta.

Lemos died aged 61, on 21 September 2023 at a hospital in Vigo, after a long illness.
