= Antonio Hierro =

Spanish footballer

Personal information
- Full name: Antonio Ruiz Hierro
- Date of birth: 5 July 1959 (age 67)
- Place of birth: Vélez-Málaga, Spain
- Height: 1.84 m (6 ft 1/2 in)
- Position: Defender

Youth career
- Málaga

Senior career*
Years	Team	Apps	(Gls)
1978–1980	Málaga B		
1980–1988	Málaga	139	(5)
1988–1990	Hércules	53	(3)
Total		192	(8)
- * Club domestic league appearances and goals

Antonio Ruiz Hierro (born 5 July 1959) is a Spanish former professional footballer who played as a defender.

== Club career ==
Born in Vélez-Málaga, Andalusia, Hierro played professionally for local Málaga, spending three seasons in La Liga and four in the Segunda División.

In the summer of 1988, after having contributed 22 matches as the club returned to the top tier, he moved to Hércules, retiring from the game at the age of 31 after a couple of Segunda División B seasons.

== Personal life ==
Hierro was the oldest of three siblings who were all footballers, and defenders. He partnered Manolo for six years at his main club whilst the youngest, Fernando, had a lengthy spell with both Real Madrid and the Spain national team, appearing on nearly 90 occasions for the latter.
