= Pere Gratacós =

Spanish footballer and coach

Personal information
- Full name: Pere Gratacós Boix
- Date of birth: 14 February 1958 (age 68)
- Place of birth: Besalú, Spain
- Height: 1.81 m (5 ft 11 1/2 in)
- Position: Centre-back

Youth career
- Besalú
- 1974–1976: Barcelona

Senior career*
Years	Team	Apps	(Gls)
1976–1978	Barcelona C		
1978–1983	Barcelona B	138	(3)
1979–1980	→ Valladolid (loan)	14	(1)
1983–1985	Osasuna	2	(0)
1985–1993	Figueres	244	(5)
Total		398	(9)

Managerial career
- 1995: Figueres (interim)
- 1995–1997: AE Roses
- 1997–1999: Girona
- 2001–2003: Figueres
- 2003–2005: Barcelona B
- 2005–2009: Catalonia
- * Club domestic league appearances and goals

Pere Gratacós Boix (born 14 February 1958) is a Spanish former professional football central defender and manager.

== Playing career ==
Born in Besalú, Girona, Catalonia, Gratacós arrived at FC Barcelona's youth system in 1974 at the age of 16, going to play for several of its youth teams. He made his professional debut with Real Valladolid in the 1979–80 season, on loan, helping to a Segunda División promotion and returning to spend a further three years with Barça's reserves, where he was awarded team captaincy.

Gratacós appeared in five official games with Barcelona's first team, but never in La Liga, leaving in 1983 and joining fellow top-division club CA Osasuna, only making two appearances in his first year in the top flight and none whatsoever in the second. In the 1985 off-season, he returned to his native region and signed for UE Figueres of Segunda División B, helping to an immediate promotion to the second tier.

Gratacós was first-choice for Figueres during his eight-year spell, when healthy – he started in all but seven of the league matches he appeared in. After suffering relegation in 1993, he retired from football aged 35.

== Coaching career ==
Gratacós started coaching one year after retiring, although he had already worked with Figueres in directorial capacities. After a brief spell as an interim manager, he was in charge of two amateur teams – also in Catalonia – for four and a half seasons, returning to his main club in 2001 and making history as it became the first in division three to reach the semi-finals of the Copa del Rey, eventually losing 2–1 on aggregate against Deportivo de La Coruña after previously ousting, amongst others, Barcelona and Osasuna.

Gratacós returned to Barcelona's reserves in 2003, leading them to two midtable finishes in the third tier. Subsequently, he coached the Catalonia national side in six friendlies.

In January 2010, Gratacós returned to Barcelona, being appointed director of its training ground and academy Ciutat Esportiva Joan Gamper. On 13 January 2017, he was sacked after he said of Lionel Messi: "Without Iniesta, Neymar and the others, he wouldn't be such a good player".
