= Jos Roossien =

Dutch footballer (born 1960)

Personal information
- Date of birth: 16 November 1960 (age 65)
- Place of birth: Groningen, Netherlands
- Position: Midfielder

Senior career*
Years	Team	Apps	(Gls)
1979–1983	SC Veendam		
1983–1994	FC Groningen	333	(53)
1994–2000	VV Roden		

International career
1984–1985	Netherlands U21	6	(0)
- * Club domestic league appearances and goals

Jos Roossien (born 16 November 1960) is a Dutch retired footballer who played as a midfielder. He was capped for the Netherlands U21 and spent most of his career in FC Groningen.

Roossien played 389 games for FC Groningen between 1983 and 1994, with 333 coming in the Eredivisie, 36 in the KNVB Cup, 18 in the UEFA Cup and 4 in the UEFA Cup Winners' Cup (of 1989–90, where he scored his only goal in European competition).
