= Juwensley Onstein =

Dutch footballer (born 2007)

Personal information
- Full name: Juwensley Onstein
- Date of birth: 7 October 2007 (age 19)
- Place of birth: Arnhem, Netherlands
- Height: 1.88 m (6 ft 2 in)
- Position: Centre-back

Team information
- Current team: Barcelona B
- Number: 22

Youth career
- –2018: ESA
- 2018–2019: Vitesse
- 2019–2023: Ajax
- 2026: Barcelona

Senior career*
| Years | Team | Apps | (Gls) |
| 2023–2025 | Jong Genk | 20 | (0) |
| 2026– | Barcelona B | 0 | (0) |

International career^{‡}
| 2023 | Netherlands U16 | 1 | (0) |
| 2024 | Netherlands U18 | 5 | (0) |
- * Club domestic league appearances and goals ‡ National team caps and goals as of 19 November 2024

Juwensley Onstein (born 7 October 2007) is a Dutch professional footballer who plays as a centre-back for Segunda Federación club Barcelona Atlètic.

== Early life ==
Onstein was born on 7 October 2007. Born in Arnhem, Netherlands, he is of Surinamese descent through his parents.

== Club career ==
As a youth player, Onstein joined the youth academy of Dutch side ESA. During the summer of 2018, he joined the youth academy of Dutch side Vitesse. Ahead of the 2019–20 season, he joined the youth academy of Dutch side Ajax.

Four years later, he signed for Belgian side Jong Genk, where he made twenty league appearances and scored zero goals. Following his stint there, he signed for Spanish side Barcelona B after receiving interest from Italian side Milan Futuro.

== International career ==
Onstein is a Netherlands youth international. On 7 September 2024, he debuted for the Netherlands national under-18 football team during a 2–0 away friendly win over the Italy national under-18 football team.

== Style of play ==
Onstein plays as a defender and is left-footed. Spanish news website SPORTARAGON.com wrote in 2026 that he "stands out for his tactical maturity , his ability to play the ball out from the back , and his left- footedness , a highly valued trait in modern football".
