= FC Barcelona Atlètic =

FC Barcelona's reserve football team

Barcelona Atlètic
- Full name: Futbol Club Barcelona Atlètic
- Nicknames: Barça Atlètic; Barça B
- Founded: 12 June 1970; 56 years ago (as Barcelona Atlètic)
- Stadium: Estadi Johan Cruyff
- Capacity: 6,000
- President: Jordi Casals
- Head coach: Juliano Belletti
- League: Segunda Federación – Group 2
- 2025–26: Segunda Federación – Group 3, 6th of 18
Home colours	Away colours

Futbol Club Barcelona Atlètic, commonly referred to as Barcelona B, Barça Atlètic or Barça B, is a football team based in Barcelona, Catalonia, Spain, that competes in Segunda Federación – Group 2, the fourth tier of the Spanish league system. Founded in 1970, it is the reserve team of FC Barcelona and it plays its home fixtures at Johan Cruyff Stadium.

Reserve teams in Spain play in the same league system as the senior team, rather than in a reserve team league. They must play at least one level below their main side, and they are not eligible to play in the Copa del Rey.

== History ==
=== Espanya Industrial ===
Founded on 1 August 1934 as Societat Esportiva Industrial Espanya, the club was originally the sports team of the factory with the same name, and its shirt featured blue and white vertical stripes. The company was owned by the family of Josep Antoni de Albert, who was briefly president of Barcelona in 1943; during Albert's presidency the club, now known as Club Deportivo Espanya Industrial, became Barcelona's reserve team and began to play home games at Camp de Les Corts.

Initially, Industrial played in the local regional leagues but, in 1950, it was promoted to Tercera División, reaching Segunda División two years later. In 1953 the club finished as runners-up in both the league and the promotion play-off but, being a nursery club of Barcelona, it was unable to move up a division.

=== Condal ===
After winning another promotion play-off in 1956, Espanya Industrial became independent of Barcelona and was renamed Club Deportivo Condal. The club wore blue shirts with two white diagonals stripes.

Condal competed once in La Liga, in the 1956–57 season, being relegated as 16th and last. In 1968, the club rejoined the Barcelona family as its reserve team, and adopted the blaugrana colours.

=== Barcelona Atlètic/Barcelona B ===
Barcelona Atlètic crest

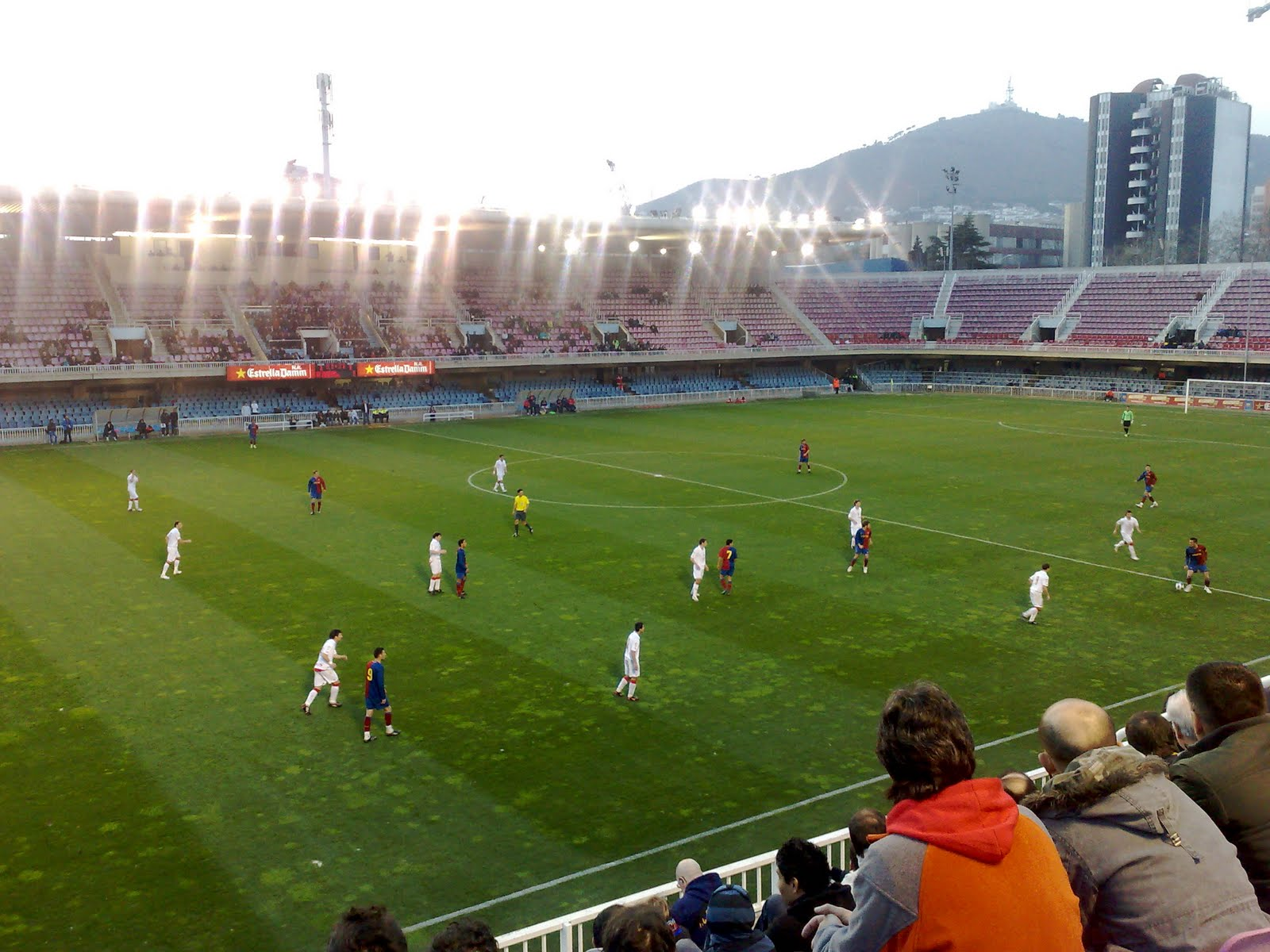
The Mini Estadi during a match

In 1970, Barcelona president Agustí Montal decided to merge Condal with another club, Atlètic Catalunya, and formed Barcelona Atlètic. Atlètic was founded in 1965 as a result of the merger of two other teams: Catalunya de Les Corts (founded in 1918 as Catalunya Sporting Club) and Fabra Coats (1926).

Under the new denomination the B-team played a total of ten seasons in the second level. At the end of 1988–89 the side returned to Segunda División B – the new third level created in 1977 – after ranking 17th.

In 1990, the team was renamed Barcelona B, but club president Joan Laporta changed the name back to Barcelona Atlètic in 2008. Two years later, his successor Sandro Rosell returned to the previous denomination, until Laporta changed again the name back to Barcelona Atlètic during his second presidential term in 2022.

Former club player Luis Enrique succeeded Pep Guardiola as team manager in the summer of 2008, as the latter was appointed main squad coach. In 2009–10 the team finished second in Group III and returned to the second tier after an absence of 11 years; this was followed by a third-place finish the following campaign, however the team was not eligible for promotion due to its status as a reserve side. They remained in Segunda División for 5 years until their relegation in the 2014–15 season. In 2016–17, Barça B achieved promotion and returned to Segunda División, however, the Catalan side was relegated back to the third division after only one season.

In 2020–21, the team finished as runner-ups in their group and reached the promotion play-offs. Despite an unsuccessful bid for promotion, the team achieved a place in the newly created third division of Spanish football, Primera División RFEF. In 2024–25, the club was relegated to the newly fourth division, Segunda Federación, after 18 years at between the second and third divisions.

== Season to season ==
Season	Tier	Division	Place	Copa del Rey
1970–71	3	3ª	4th	First round
1971–72	3	3ª	19th	Second round
1972–73	4	Reg. Pref.	1st	
1973–74	3	3ª	1st	Fourth round
1974–75	2	2ª	10th	Round of 16
1975–76	2	2ª	6th	First round
1976–77	2	2ª	20th	Second round
1977–78	3	2ª B	5th	First round
1978–79	3	2ª B	4th	
1979–80	3	2ª B	14th	Second round
1980–81	3	2ª B	3rd	
1981–82	3	2ª B	1st	Third round
1982–83	2	2ª	11th	Third round
1983–84	2	2ª	7th	Round of 16
1984–85	2	2ª	9th	Third round
1985–86	2	2ª	13th	First round
1986–87	2	2ª	13th	Third round
1987–88	2	2ª	8th	Round of 32
1988–89	2	2ª	17th	Third round
1989–90	3	2ª B	2nd	Second round

Season	Tier	Division	Place
1990–91	3	2ª B	1st
1991–92	2	2ª	6th
1992–93	2	2ª	8th
1993–94	2	2ª	8th
1994–95	2	2ª	6th
1995–96	2	2ª	14th
1996–97	2	2ª	19th
1997–98	3	2ª B	1st
1998–99	2	2ª	20th
1999–00	3	2ª B	11th
2000–01	3	2ª B	9th
2001–02	3	2ª B	1st
2002–03	3	2ª B	2nd
2003–04	3	2ª B	8th
2004–05	3	2ª B	11th
2005–06	3	2ª B	6th
2006–07	3	2ª B	19th
2007–08	4	3ª	1st
2008–09	3	2ª B	5th
2009–10	3	2ª B	2nd

Season	Tier	Division	Place
2010–11	2	2ª	3rd
2011–12	2	2ª	8th
2012–13	2	2ª	9th
2013–14	2	2ª	3rd
2014–15	2	2ª	22nd
2015–16	3	2ª B	10th
2016–17	3	2ª B	1st
2017–18	2	2ª	20th
2018–19	3	2ª B	8th
2019–20	3	2ª B	2nd
2020–21	3	2ª B	2nd
2021–22	3	1ª RFEF	9th
2022–23	3	1ª Fed.	4th
2023–24	3	1ª Fed.	3rd
2024–25	3	1ª Fed.	16th
2025–26	4	2ª Fed.	6th
2026–27	4	2ª Fed.	

- 23 seasons in Segunda División
- 4 seasons in Primera Federación/Primera División RFEF
- 23 seasons in Segunda División B
- 2 seasons in Segunda Federación
- 4 seasons in Tercera División

== Honours ==
- Segunda División B
  - Winners (5): 1981–82, 1990–91, 1997–98, 2001–02, 2016–17
- Tercera División
  - Winners (2): 1973–74, 2007–08
- Primera Catalana
  - Winners (1): 1972–73

== Players ==
=== Current squad ===
As of 26 October 2026

Note: Flags indicate national team as defined under FIFA eligibility rules; some limited exceptions apply. Players may hold more than one non-FIFA nationality.

No.	Pos.	Nation	Player
1	GK	ESP	Eder Aller (vice-captain)
2	DF	ESP	Landry Farré (captain)
3	DF	ESP	Javi Castro
4	DF	ESP	Álex Campos (4th captain)
5	DF	ECU	Josué Caicedo (on loan from LDU Quito)
6	MF	ESP	Pedro Villar
7	FW	GHA	Aziz Issah
8	MF	ESP	Pedro Rodríguez
10	MF	ESP	Ebrima Tunkara
11	FW	NED	Shane Kluivert
12	MF	GER	Mirza Catovic (on loan from VfB Stuttgart)
13	GK	ESP	Max Bonfill

No.	Pos.	Nation	Player
14	MF	ESP	Juan Ybarra
15	DF	ESP	Alex Walton
16	MF	ESP	Dani Ávila
17	FW	ESP	Álex González
18	DF	GHA	Hafiz Gariba
19	FW	EGY	Hamza Abdelkarim
20	FW	MLI	Ibrahim Diarra
21	DF	ESP	Guillem Víctor (3rd captain)
22	DF	NED	Juwensley Onstein
23	FW	ESP	Ignasi Quer
24	FW	BEL	Jesse Bisiwu
25	GK	ESP	Iker Rodríguez

=== Youth Academy ===
Note: Flags indicate national team as defined under FIFA eligibility rules; some limited exceptions apply. Players may hold more than one non-FIFA nationality.

No.	Pos.	Nation	Player
26	MF	ESP	Adam Argemí
27	FW	ESP	Joni Hernández
28	MF	ISR	Orian Goren
29	FW	ESP	Òscar Gistau
31	GK	ESP	Gerard Sala
33	DF	ESP	Nil Teixidor

No.	Pos.	Nation	Player
34	DF	ESP	Sergi Mayans
35	DF	ESP	Jordi Pesquer
37	FW	ESP	Nil Vicens
38	DF	ARG	Nicolás Marcipar
42	DF	ESP	Pol Bernabéu

=== Other players under contract ===
Note: Flags indicate national team as defined under FIFA eligibility rules; some limited exceptions apply. Players may hold more than one non-FIFA nationality.

No. / Pos. / Nation / Player; — / DF / URU / Patricio Pacífico (on loan from Defensor Sporting)	No. / Pos. / Nation / Player; — / MF / ESP / Juan Hernández

=== Out on loan ===
Note: Flags indicate national team as defined under FIFA eligibility rules; some limited exceptions apply. Players may hold more than one non-FIFA nationality.

No. / Pos. / Nation / Player; — / GK / USA / Diego Kochen (at Lyngby until 30 June 2027)	No. / Pos. / Nation / Player; — / GK / HUN / Áron Yaakobishvili (at Almería until 30 June 2027)

== Personnel ==
=== Current technical staff ===
Position	Staff
Head coach	(Brazil) Juliano Belletti
Assistant coach	(Spain) Sergio Busquets
Goalkeeping coach	(Spain) Unai Alba
Fitness coach	(Spain) Pablo Rivas (Spain) Ramiro Marín (Spain) Marc Guitart
Analyst	(Spain) Joan Vicente
Doctor	(Spain) Xavier Valle
Scout	(France) Jérôme Bigot
Physiotherapist	(Spain) Jon Álvarez (Spain) Chechu Pérez (Spain) Francesc Guilanyà
Kit man	(Spain) Carles Busquets
Juvenil A (U19 A) Head coach	(Spain) Pol Planas

Last updated: 26 July 2025
Source: FC Barcelona B

== Former coaches ==
- (Spain) Josep Seguer (1970–1972)
- (Spain) Luis Aloy (1972–1976)
- (Spain) Laureano Ruiz (1976–1978)
- (Spain) Antoni Torres (1978–1979, 1980–1983)
- (Spain) Joan Segarra (1979–1980)
- (Spain) Jaume Olivé (1980)
- (Spain) José Luis Romero (1983–1984)
- (Spain) Martínez Vilaseca (1984–1987)
- (Spain) Lluís Pujol (1987–1989)
- (Spain) Quique Costas (1989–1996, 2001–2003, 2005–2007)
- (Spain) Juande Ramos (1996–1997)
- (Spain) Josep Maria Gonzalvo (1997–2001)
- (Spain) Pere Gratacós (2003–2005)
- (Spain) Pep Guardiola (2007–2008)
- (Spain) Luis Enrique (2008–2011)
- (Spain) Eusebio Sacristán (2011–2015)
- (Spain) Jordi Vinyals (2015)
- (Spain) Gerard López (2015–2018)
- (Spain) García Pimienta (2018–2021)
- (Spain) Albert Capellas (interim) (2021)
- (Spain) Sergi Barjuán (2021–2022)
- (Mexico) Rafa Márquez (2022–2024)
- (Spain) Albert Sánchez (2024–2025)
- (Spain) Sergi Milà (2025)
- (Brazil) Juliano Belletti (2025–)

== Records ==
Players in bold are still active with club.

=== Most appearances ===
All competitions

Ranking	Nationality	Name	Years	Apps
1	Spain	Antonio Pérez Ayllón	1978–1985	192
2	Spain	Cándido Viana Valentín	1977–1983	176
3	Spain	Jesús Angoy	1988–1995	164
4	Spain	Albert Albesa	1983–1988	160
5	Spain	Pere Gratacós	1978–1983	150
6	Spain	Juan Carlos Rojo	1978–1988	146
7	Spain	Arnau Riera	2001–2006	143
8	Spain	Francesc Guitart Sáez	1979–1984	141
8	Spain	David García	1999–2004	141
10	Spain	Joaquim Ferrer Sala	1978–1983	137

League matches (2ª and 2ª B)

Ranking	Nationality	Name	Years	Apps
1	Spain	Antonio Pérez Ayllón	1978–1985	172
2	Spain	Cándido Viana Valentín	1977–1983	164
3	Spain	Jesús Angoy	1988–1995	158
4	Spain	Albert Albesa	1983–1988	141
5	Spain	Juan Carlos Rojo	1978–1988	139
5	Spain	Arnau Riera	2001–2006	139
7	Spain	Pere Gratacós	1978–1983	138
8	Cameroon	Jean Marie Dongou	2011–2016	132
9	Spain	David García	1999–2004	130
9	Nigeria	Haruna Babangida	1998–2004	130
9	Spain	Joan Verdú	2002–2006	130

=== Top scorers ===
All competitions

Ranking	Nationality	Name	Years	Goals	Apps
1	Spain	Jonathan Soriano	2009–2012	59	84
2	Nigeria	Haruna Babangida	1998–2004	47	136
3	Spain	Antonio Pinilla	1988–1992	39	102
3	Spain	Ramón Calderé	1977–1984	39	135
5	Spain	Sergio García	2002–2004	37	66
6	Spain	Luis Alonso Cebada	1981–1983	33	83
7	Spain	Roberto Trashorras	1999–2003	33	119
8	Spain	Mario Rosas	1997–2000	32	103
9	Spain	Paco Clos	1979–1983	31	110
9	Spain	Joan Verdú	2002–2006	31	134
9	Spain	Antonio Pérez Ayllón	1978–1985	31	192

League matches (2ª and 2ª B)

Ranking	Nationality	Name	Years	Goals	Apps
1	Spain	Jonathan Soriano	2009–2012	55	79
2	Nigeria	Haruna Babangida	1998–2004	46	130
3	Spain	Sergio García	2002–2004	34	60
3	Spain	Antonio Pinilla	1988–1992	34	90
5	Spain	Ramón Calderé	1977–1984	31	118
6	Spain	Mario Rosas	1997–2000	30	97
6	Spain	Joan Verdú	2002–2006	30	130
8	Spain	Nolito	2008–2011	29	101
8	Spain	Roberto Trashorras	1999–2003	29	107
8	Cameroon	Jean Marie Dongou	2011–2016	29	132
8	Spain	Antonio Pérez Ayllón	1978–1985	29	172

== Stadium ==
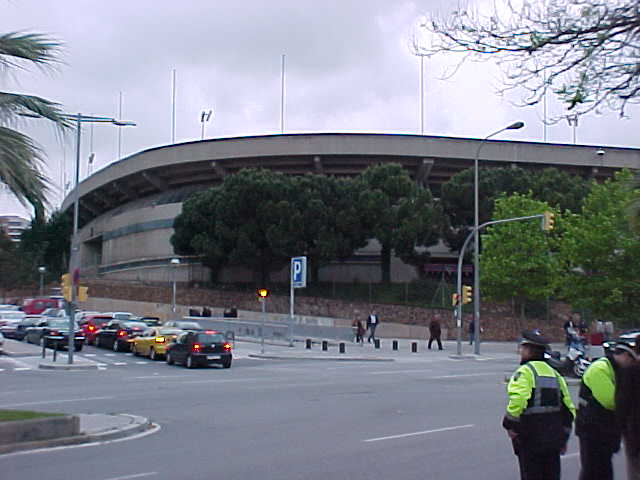
The Mini Estadi, home stadium until 2019

On 23 September 1982 the Mini Estadi was inaugurated by Barcelona president Josep Lluís Núñez. Next to the ground there are two training pitches, pitch 3 and 4, which have artificial turf – the latter has a regulation size of 100 x 70 metres and has seating for 1,000 spectators.

Mini Estadi has also hosted games for the Andorra national football team, and the Barcelona Dragons of American football.

As a part of the Espai Barça project, the Mini Estadi was demolished and the Estadi Johan Cruyff was opened to take its place starting in the 2019–20 season. Also, as part of this project the Camp Nou underwent renovation.

== La Masia ==
Inaugurated on 26 September 1966, La Masia is the name given to Barcelona's training facilities located near the Camp Nou in the Les Corts district of Barcelona. It is an ancient country residence built in 1702 and once Camp Nou was inaugurated in 1957, the building was remodelled and extended for use as the club's social headquarters.

In 1979, La Masia became the residence of young players from outside of the city. In the following decades the academy forged several players that would later appear for both the main squad and the Spain national team, Guillermo Amor, Albert Ferrer, Iván de la Peña, Josep Guardiola, Carles Puyol, Gerard López, Xavi, Víctor Valdés, and Andrés Iniesta being amongst the most prominent. Lionel Messi is also an alumnus of La Masia and is one of the most famous players to play for Barcelona as well as the Argentina national football team.

== Notable players ==
Note: This list includes players that have appeared in at least 100 top league games, have represented their countries in international level, or both.

- (Argentina) Lionel Messi
- (Albania) Iván Balliu
- (Albania) Rey Manaj
- (Andorra) Marc Bernaus
- (Argentina) Sergio Araujo
- (Argentina) José Raúl Iglesias
- (Bosnia and Herzegovina) Srđan Pecelj
- (Brazil) Marlon
- (Brazil) Rafinha
- (Cameroon) Macky Bagnack
- (Cameroon) Martin Hongla
- (Cameroon) Fabrice Ondoa
- (Cameroon) Patrick Suffo
- (Canada) Ballou Tabla
- (Republic of the Congo) Merveil Ndockyt
- (Croatia) Alen Halilović
- (Croatia) Goran Vučević
- (Cyprus) Urko Pardo
- (Ecuador) Diego Almeida
- (The Gambia) Alasana Manneh
- (Guinea) Ilaix Moriba
- (Guinea-Bissau) Edgar Ié
- (Honduras) Anthony Lozano
- (Hungary) Ottó Vincze
- (Israel) Gai Assulin
- (Italy) Thiago Motta
- (Japan) Hiroki Abe
- (Jordan) Tha'er Bawab
- (Mexico) Giovani dos Santos
- (Mexico) Jonathan dos Santos
- (Mexico) Santiago Fernández
- (Mexico) Efraín Juárez
- (Montenegro) Lazar Carević
- (Morocco) Ilias Akhomach
- (Morocco) Munir El Haddadi
- (Morocco) Moha El Yaagoubi
- (Morocco) Abde Ezzalzouli
- (Morocco) Chadi Riad
- (Netherlands) Jordi Cruyff
- (Nigeria) Haruna Babangida
- (Nigeria) Ezekiel Bassey
- (Nigeria) Samuel Okunowo
- (North Macedonia) David Babunski
- (Paraguay) Antonio Sanabria
- (Russia) Igor Korneev
- (Scotland) Steve Archibald
- (Senegal) Diawandou Diagne
- (Senegal) Moussa Wagué
- (Serbia) Goran Drulić
- (Sierra Leone) Alfi Conteh-Lacalle
- (South Korea) Lee Seung-woo
- (South Korea) Paik Seung-ho
- (Spain) Damià Abella
- (Spain) José Joaquín Albaladejo
- (Spain) Luis Alberto
- (Spain) Albert Albesa
- (Spain) Thiago Alcântara
- (Spain) Carles Aleñá
- (Spain) Quique Álvarez
- (Spain) Guillermo Amor
- (Spain) Francesc Arnau
- (Spain) Óscar Arpón
- (Spain) Esteban Areta
- (Spain) Mikel Arteta
- (Spain) Alejandro Balde
- (Spain) Sergi Barjuán
- (Spain) Marc Bartra
- (Spain) Marc Bernal
- (Spain) Alberto Botía
- (Spain) Sergio Busquets
- (Spain) Ramón Calderé
- (Spain) Lobo Carrasco
- (Spain) Lluís Carreras
- (Spain) Marc Casadó
- (Spain) Albert Celades
- (Spain) Luis Cembranos
- (Spain) Thomas Christiansen
- (Spain) Paco Clos
- (Spain) Miquel Corominas
- (Spain) Pau Cubarsí
- (Spain) Marc Cucurella
- (Spain) Iván de la Peña
- (Spain) Gerard Deulofeu
- (Spain) Martín Domínguez
- (Spain) Juan José Estella
- (Spain) Kiko Femenía
- (Spain) Albert Ferrer
- (Spain) Chico Flores
- (Spain) Andreu Fontàs
- (Spain) Paco Fortes
- (Spain) Esteve Fradera
- (Spain) Sergio García
- (Spain) Gabri García
- (Spain) Óscar García
- (Spain) Roger García
- (Spain) Luis García
- (Spain) Salva García
- (Spain) Sergio García
- (Spain) Gavi
- (Spain) Delfí Geli
- (Spain) José Gil
- (Spain) Jordi Gómez
- (Spain) Sergi Gómez
- (Spain) Nico González
- (Spain) Álex Grimaldo
- (Spain) Pep Guardiola
- (Spain) Dani Güiza
- (Spain) Gerard Gumbau
- (Spain) Xavi Hernández
- (Spain) Sebastián Herrera
- (Spain) Alejo Indias
- (Spain) Andrés Iniesta
- (Spain) Juan Luis Irazusta
- (Spain) Ferran Jutglà
- (Spain) Bojan Krkić
- (Spain) Fermín López
- (Spain) Gerard López
- (Spain) David Lombán
- (Spain) Miguel Ángel Lozano
- (Spain) Manolo
- (Spain) Quique Martín
- (Spain) Nacho Martín
- (Spain) Rubén Martínez
- (Spain) Paco Martínez
- (Spain) Josep Martínez
- (Spain) Jordi Masip
- (Spain) Luis Milla
- (Spain) Mingo
- (Spain) Óscar Mingueza
- (Spain) Juan Miranda
- (Spain) Martín Montoya
- (Spain) Josep Moratalla
- (Spain) Pepe Moré
- (Spain) Javi Moreno
- (Spain) Carlos Muñoz
- (Spain) Fernando Navarro
- (Spain) Nayim
- (Spain) Nolito
- (Spain) Antonio Olmo
- (Spain) Cristóbal Parralo
- (Spain) Patric
- (Spain) Ángel Pedraza
- (Spain) Pedro
- (Spain) Carles Pérez
- (Spain) Antonio Pinilla
- (Spain) Oleguer Presas
- (Spain) Riqui Puig
- (Spain) Carles Puyol
- (Spain) Sandro Ramírez
- (Spain) Pepe Reina
- (Spain) Oriol Riera
- (Spain) Sergi Roberto
- (Spain) Rubén Rochina
- (Spain) Juan Carlos Rojo
- (Spain) Oriol Romeu
- (Spain) Mikel Roteta
- (Spain) Francisco Rufete
- (Spain) Abel Ruiz
- (Spain) Ilie Sánchez
- (Spain) Tente Sánchez
- (Spain) Onésimo Sánchez
- (Spain) Víctor Sánchez
- (Spain) Pepe Serer
- (Spain) Adjutori Serrat
- (Spain) Jonathan Soriano
- (Spain) Denis Suárez
- (Spain) Cristian Tello
- (Spain) Xavi Torres
- (Spain) Adama Traoré
- (Spain) Roberto Trashorras
- (Spain) Víctor Valdés
- (Spain) Toni Velamazán
- (Spain) Joan Verdú
- (Spain) Paqui Veza
- (Spain) Javier Villena
- (Spain) Jordi Vinyals
- (Spain) Lamine Yamal
- (United States) Konrad de la Fuente
- (Uruguay) Ronald Araújo
- (Venezuela) Alejandro Marqués
- (Venezuela) Jeffrén Suárez
