= David García (footballer, born 1980) =

Spanish footballer

Personal information
- Full name: David García Haro
- Date of birth: 3 February 1980 (age 46)
- Place of birth: Valencia, Spain
- Height: 1.75 m (5 ft 9 in)
- Position: Defender

Youth career
- Levante
- 1996–1998: Barcelona

Senior career*
Years	Team	Apps	(Gls)
1998–2000	Barcelona C	46	(0)
2000–2004	Barcelona B	141	(2)
2004–2008	Gimnàstic	91	(2)
2008–2009	Cádiz	13	(0)
2010	Terrassa	13	(1)
2011–2012	Terrassa	32	(1)
2012–2013	Vilassar Mar	?	(0)
Total		336	(6)

International career
1998–1999	Spain U18	8	(1)
- * Club domestic league appearances and goals

David García Haro (born 3 February 1980) is a Spanish retired footballer who played as a defender.

== Club career ==
Born in Valencia, Valencian Community, Garcia signed for FC Barcelona at the age of 16 from local Levante UD, playing his first four senior seasons with the B-side in the third division and helping them to two top-two league finishes, with the reserves subsequently falling short in the promotion playoffs. He never appeared officially for the Catalans' first team, his only appearance being the second half of a friendly match with China on 22 April 2004, coming on as a substitute for Marc Overmars.

In the summer of 2004, García moved to Barça neighbours Gimnàstic de Tarragona, contributing to 28 league games in his second season as the club returned to La Liga after a 56-year absence. On 10 December 2006, he scored his only goal in the top division in a 2–1 home win against Levante, but Nàstic was immediately relegated back.

After one year with Cádiz CF, playing sparingly in another first division promotion, García resumed his career in the lower leagues.
