= Eulalio Mora =

Paraguayan footballer (born 1962)

Personal information
- Full name: Eulalio Alberto Mora Barreto
- Date of birth: 10 December 1962 (age 63)
- Place of birth: Asunción, Paraguay
- Position: Forward

Senior career*
Years	Team	Apps	(Gls)
1981–1986	Guaraní		
1987	Elche	6	(1)
1989	Cádiz	4	(0)
1990–1991	Guaraní		
1992	Cobresal		

International career
1979	Paraguay U20	3	(0)
1983–1985	Paraguay	7	(0)
- * Club domestic league appearances and goals

Eulalio Alberto Mora Barreto (born 10 December 1962) is a Paraguayan former professional footballer who played as a forward.

== Career ==
Mora joined the youth academy of Paraguayan side Guaraní at the age of thirteen. He started his senior career with the club. He suffered a fractured foot while playing for the club. He helped the club win the league. In 1987, he signed for Spanish side Elche. In 1989, he signed for Spanish side Cádiz. He befriended El Salvador international Mágico González while playing for the club. In 1990, he returned to Paraguayan side Guaraní. In 1992, he signed for Chilean side Cobresal.

Mora was a Paraguay international. He made seven appearances and scored zero goals while playing for the Paraguay national team. He mainly operated as a forward. He was known for his shooting ability.

== Personal life ==
Mora was born on 10 December 1962 in Paraguay. After retiring from professional football, he worked as a taxi driver. He has four children and five grandchildren. He is of indigenous descent.
