= Jon Aspiazu =

Spanish footballer (born 1962)

Personal information
- Full name: Jon Iñaki Aspiazu San Emeterio
- Date of birth: 5 November 1962 (age 63)
- Place of birth: Bilbao, Spain
- Height: 1.72 m (5 ft 8 in)
- Position: Midfielder

Team information
- Current team: Athletic Bilbao (assistant)

Youth career
- Athletic Bilbao

Senior career*
| Years | Team | Apps | (Gls) |
| 1979–1984 | Bilbao Athletic | 130 | (4) |
| 1983–1984 | Athletic Bilbao | 0 | (0) |
| 1984–1985 | Hércules | 6 | (0) |
| 1985–1987 | Sestao | 75 | (7) |
| 1987–1992 | Deportivo La Coruña | 134 | (8) |
| 1992–1994 | Sestao | 63 | (3) |
| 1994–1996 | Amurrio | 71 | (1) |
| Total | | 479 | (23) |

Managerial career
- 1997–1998: Amurrio
- 1998: Aurrerá Vitoria
- 2002–2003: Bilbao Athletic (assistant)
- 2003–2005: Athletic Bilbao (assistant)
- 2006–2008: Espanyol (assistant)
- 2008–2009: Olympiacos (assistant)
- 2009–2010: Villarreal (assistant)
- 2010–2012: Olympiacos (assistant)
- 2012–2013: Valencia (assistant)
- 2013–2017: Athletic Bilbao (assistant)
- 2017–2020: Barcelona (assistant)
- 2022–: Athletic Bilbao (assistant)
- * Club domestic league appearances and goals

Jon Iñaki Aspiazu San Emeterio (born 5 November 1962) is a Spanish retired footballer who played as a midfielder, and who is the assistant head coach of Athletic Bilbao.

== Playing career ==
Born in Bilbao, Biscay, Basque Country, Aspiazu was an Athletic Bilbao youth graduate. He made his senior debut with the reserves in the 1979–80 campaign, in Segunda División B.

Aspiazu made his first team debut on 19 May 1984, starting in a 1–3 home loss against Atlético Madrid, for the year's Copa de la Liga. In July, he moved to fellow La Liga team Hércules CF, but featured rarely; his debut in the category occurred on 18 November 1984, in a 1–1 home draw against Sporting de Gijón.

In 1985 Aspiazu joined Segunda División side Sestao Sport Club, being an undisputed starter during his two-year spell at the club. He subsequently signed for fellow league team Deportivo de La Coruña, achieving promotion to the top tier in 1991.

In 1992 Aspiazu returned to Sestao, but suffered relegation in his first season. In 1994 he joined third-tier side Amurrio Club, and retired in 1996 at the age of 34.

== Managerial career ==
In 1997, Aspiazu was appointed manager of his last club Amurrio, still in the third division. He was named in charge of CD Aurrerá de Vitoria in June of the following year, but was relieved from his duties in November.

In 2003, Aspiazu joined Ernesto Valverde's staff at his former club Bilbao Athletic, as an assistant. He remained in the role for the following years, being Valverde's second at Athletic, RCD Espanyol, Olympiacos, Villarreal CF, Valencia CF and FC Barcelona.

== Personal life ==
His son Iker was also a footballer and a midfielder who spent several years in the Athletic Bilbao youth system but did not break through to the professional level.
