= Herbert Oberhofer =

Austrian footballer

Personal information
- Date of birth: 16 November 1955
- Date of death: 23 November 2012 (aged 57)
- Position: Defender

Senior career*
Years	Team	Apps	(Gls)
1973–1990	Admira/Wacker	428	(33)

International career
1976–1977	Austria	6	(0)
- * Club domestic league appearances and goals

Herbert Oberhofer (16 November 1955 – 23 November 2012) was an Austrian international footballer.
