= Albert Albesa =

Spanish footballer (born 1965)

Personal information
- Full name: Albert Albesa Gasulla
- Date of birth: 6 March 1965 (age 61)
- Place of birth: Gavà, Spain
- Height: 1.87 m (6 ft 2 in)
- Position: Centre-back

Youth career
- Gavà
- –1983: Barcelona

Senior career*
Years	Team	Apps	(Gls)
1983–1988	Barcelona Atlètic	141	(3)
1988–1989	Real Valladolid	35	(1)
1989–1994	Español	127	(3)
1994–1995	Real Valladolid	17	(0)
1995–1996	Deportivo Alavés	25	(1)
1996–1999	Gavà	81	(6)
Total		426	(14)
- * Club domestic league appearances and goals

Albert Albesa Gasulla (born 6 March 1965) is a Spanish former professional footballer who played as a centre-back. He played in La Liga for Real Valladolid and Español, making a total of 123 top flight appearances. He also played over 100 matches for Barcelona's B team, Barcelona Atlètic.

== Club career ==
Born in Gavà, Barcelona, Catalonia, Albesa started his career in the youth teams of local clubs CF Gavà and FC Barcelona. He was promoted into the club's B team, Barcelona Atlètic, then in the Segunda División, for the 1983–84 season. He was given his senior debut by coach José Luis Romero in a 2–0 home win over Rayo Vallecano at the Mini Estadi on 1 October 1983.

Albesa spent five seasons with Atlètic, never being called up to the Barcelona first team, before moving into La Liga with Real Valladolid in 1988. After just one season, he returned to his home city and the Segunda División by joining Español ahead of the 1989–90 season.

Albesa remained at the Sarrià Stadium for five seasons, helping Español to promotion into La Liga on two occasions. In his first season, he wrote his name into the Español history books by scoring the decisive penalty in a promotion playoff against Málaga. Over the next three seasons in the top flight, Albesa formed a strong centre-back partnership with Mino, who joined the club in 1990 from Sevilla.

Español were relegated in 1992–93, but Albesa played a key role as they were promoted again at the first attempt the following season under José Antonio Camacho, this time as champions. Following this success, Albesa departed Español and rejoined Valladolid, As a mark of his impact on the club, a gate at Espanyol's new stadium was named after Albesa in 2015.

1994–95 was not a good season for Valladolid, who would have been relegated from the top flight but for the audit scandal involving Sevilla and Celta Vigo. At the end of the year, Albesa and teammate Pablo Gómez both left to join Deportivo Alavés in the Segunda División. After a single season with Alavés, Albesa returned to his hometown club Gavà in 1996, where he would stay for three seasons in Segunda División B, suffering relegation in the last of these. Albesa retired in 1999 at the age of 34.

== Honours ==
Español

- Segunda División: 1993–94
