= Mikael Martinsson =

Swedish footballer

Personal information
- Full name: Lars Erik Mikael Martinsson
- Date of birth: 29 March 1966 (age 60)
- Place of birth: Solna, Sweden
- Height: 1.85 m (6 ft 1 in)
- Position: Forward

Senior career*
Years	Team	Apps	(Gls)
1983–1987	Vasalund IF	102	(29)
1987–1988	CD Castellón	25	(2)
1988	Vasalund IF	25	(4)
1989–1992	Djurgårdens IF	87	(32)
1993–1998	IFK Göteborg	110	(31)
1998–2000	IF Elfsborg	49	(7)
2001	Vasalund IF		

International career
1991–1993	Sweden	6	(0)
- * Club domestic league appearances and goals

Lars Erik Mikael Martinsson (born 29 March 1966) is a Swedish former footballer who played as a forward. He played for Vasalund IF, CD Castellón, Djurgårdens IF, IFK Göteborg and IF Elfsborg. He made six appearances for the Sweden men's national football team

Individual

- Årets Ärkeängel: 1998
