= Orlando Suárez =

Spanish footballer (born 1972)

Personal information
- Full name: Orlando Suárez Azofra
- Date of birth: 21 November 1979 (age 46)
- Place of birth: Las Palmas, Spain
- Position: Striker

Youth career
- Las Palmas

Senior career*
| Years | Team | Apps | (Gls) |
| 1989–2003 | Las Palmas | 341 | (83) |
| 2003–2005 | Universidad de Las Palmas | 34 | (4) |

International career
- Canary Islands
- * Club domestic league appearances and goals

Orlando Suárez Azofra (born 21 November 1972) is a Spanish former footballer who played as a forward.

== Early life ==
As a youth player, Suárez joined the youth academy of Spanish side Las Palmas.

== Club career ==
Suárez debuted for Spanish side Las Palmas at the age of sixteen. At the age of seventeen, he became the club's youngest goalscorer. He was known for forming an attacking trio with Chili and Eloy Jiménez. He helped the club earn promotion from the Spanish third tier to the Spanish La Liga. He is regarded as one of the most important players in club history.

== International career ==
Suárez played for the Canary Islands autonomous football team. Previously, he represented Spain at youth international level.

== Post-playing career ==
After retiring from professional football, Suárez was involved in local politics.

== Style of play ==
Suárez mainly operated as a striker and was known for his speed.
