= La Seca =

La Seca, Spain
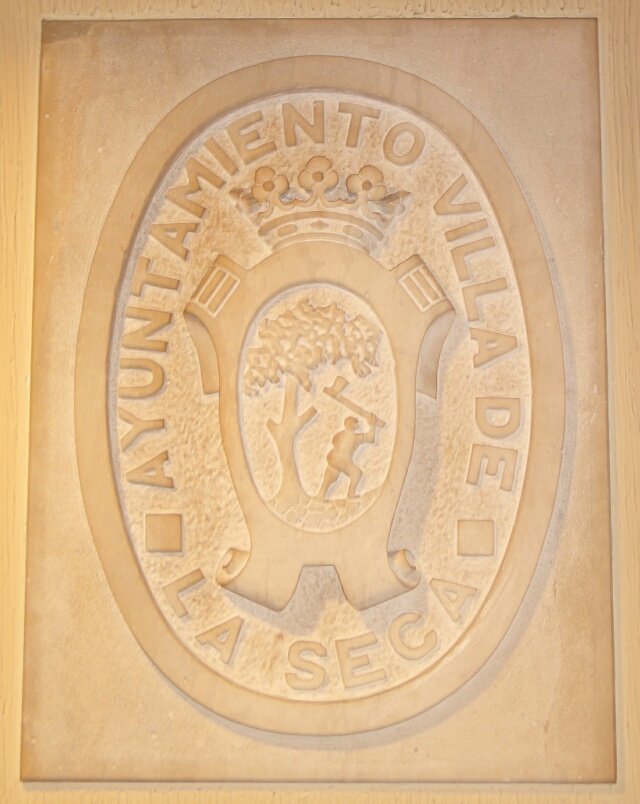
- Coat of arms

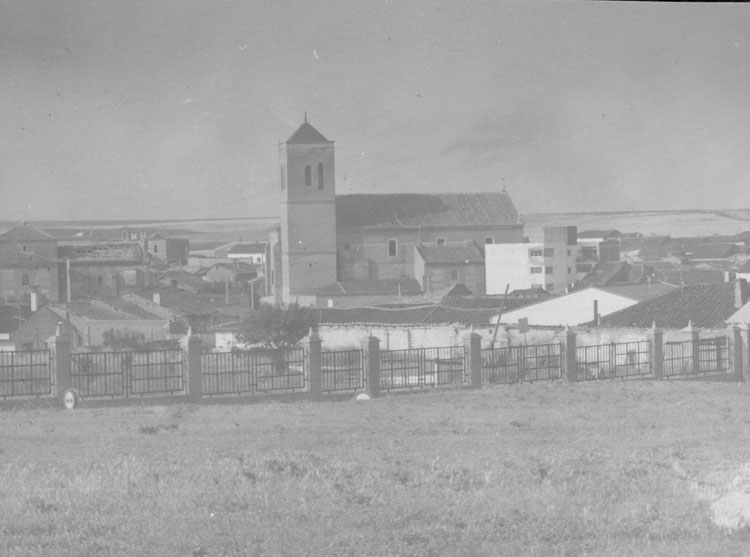
- Panoramic view.
- Coordinates: 41.4150°N 4.9069°W
- Country: Spain
- Autonomous community: Castile and León
- Province: Valladolid
- Municipality: La Seca

Area
  - Total: 65 km^{2} (25 sq mi)

Population (2025-01-01)
  - Total: 1,015
  - Density: 16/km^{2} (40/sq mi)
- Time zone: UTC+1 (CET)
  - Summer (DST): UTC+2 (CEST)

La Seca is a municipality located in the province of Valladolid, Castile and León, Spain. According to the 2016 census (INE), the municipality has a population of 1,105 inhabitants.

== See also ==
- Cuisine of the province of Valladolid
