= Manolo Hierro =

Spanish professional footballer (born 1962)

Personal information
- Full name: Manuel Ruiz Hierro
- Date of birth: 8 February 1962 (age 64)
- Place of birth: Vélez-Málaga, Spain
- Height: 1.82 m (5 ft 11 1/2 in)
- Position: Centre-back

Youth career
- Málaga

Senior career*
Years	Team	Apps	(Gls)
1980–1984	Málaga B		
1981–1986	Málaga	51	(4)
1986–1988	Valladolid	57	(4)
1988–1990	Barcelona	0	(0)
1988–1989	→ Betis (loan)	24	(1)
1989–1990	→ Tenerife (loan)	28	(0)
1990–1994	Tenerife	46	(2)
Total		206	(11)

International career
1988	Spain U21	1	(0)
1988	Spain U23	2	(0)

Managerial career
- 2006: Málaga
- 2007–2008: Puertollano
- * Club domestic league appearances and goals

Manuel "Manolo" Ruiz Hierro (born 8 February 1962) is a Spanish former professional footballer who played as a central defender.

He amassed La Liga totals of 175 matches and seven goals over ten seasons, representing mainly Tenerife (four years) and Málaga (three).

== Playing career ==
Born in Vélez-Málaga, Andalusia, Hierro started playing professionally with local CD Málaga, but only totalled 26 games for the first team in his first five seasons, also suffering La Liga relegation in the last one. After one more year in the Segunda División, he joined Real Valladolid of the top division.

After helping the Castile and León side finish eighth in his second season, with one of the best defensive records in the competition (38 matches, 34 goals), Hierro signed for Barcelona, but only lasted a few months in Catalonia, moving to Real Betis on loan. Suffering top-flight relegation with the Verdiblancos, he subsequently joined Tenerife– also in the top tier and on loan – and retired from football at 32, having amassed professional totals of 206 games and 11 goals.

== Post-retirement ==
After retiring as a player, Hierro served as director of football to his first team – now renamed Málaga CF – for several seasons. In early 2006, following the dismissal of Antonio Tapia, he was named head coach, as the club was eventually relegated from the first division and he was relieved of his duties as both director and manager.

== Personal life ==
Hierro was the second of three siblings who were all footballers, and defenders. His older brother, Antonio, played almost exclusively for Málaga, while the youngest, Fernando, represented mainly Real Madrid and scored more than 20 goals for the Spain national team.

From 1980 to 1986 Manuel and Antonio played together in Málaga, and Fernando was Manuel's teammate at Valladolid for one season.
