= Enrique Moreno (footballer) =

Spanish footballer

Personal information
- Full name: Enrique Moreno Bellver
- Date of birth: 6 September 1963
- Place of birth: Valencia, Spain
- Date of death: 8 February 2012 (aged 48)
- Place of death: Valencia, Spain
- Height: 1.83 m (6 ft 0 in)
- Position: Central defender

Youth career
- Valencia

Senior career*
Years	Team	Apps	(Gls)
1981–1982	Mestalla		
1981–1985	Valencia	17	(0)
1985–1986	Rayo Vallecano	31	(0)
1986–1992	Valladolid	122	(1)
Total		170	(1)

International career
1981–1982	Spain U18	5	(0)
- * Club domestic league appearances and goals

Enrique Moreno Bellver (6 September 1963 – 8 February 2012) was a Spanish professional footballer who played as a central defender.

== Career ==
Born in Valencia, Moreno played for Valencia, Rayo Vallecano and Valladolid.

== Death ==
Moreno died on 8 February 2012, at the age of 48.
