= Gregorio Fonseca =

Spanish footballer

Goyo Fonseca
Personal information
- Full name: Gregorio Fonseca Recio
- Date of birth: 26 November 1965 (age 60)
- Place of birth: La Seca, Spain
- Height: 1.80 m (5 ft 11 in)
- Position: Forward

Youth career
- Valladolid

Senior career*
| Years | Team | Apps | (Gls) |
| 1984–1985 | Valladolid B | | |
| 1984–1992 | Valladolid | 163 | (45) |
| 1986–1987 | → Málaga (loan) | 18 | (2) |
| 1992–1995 | Espanyol | 41 | (10) |
| 1995 | Albacete | 13 | (0) |
| 1995–1996 | Valladolid | 11 | (1) |
| Total | | 246 | (58) |

International career
| 1984 | Spain U18 | 1 | (1) |
| 1992 | Spain | 4 | (1) |
- * Club domestic league appearances and goals

Gregorio 'Goyo' Fonseca Recio (born 26 November 1965) is a Spanish former professional footballer who played as a forward.

== Club career ==
Born in La Seca, Province of Valladolid, Castile and León, Fonseca amassed La Liga totals of 209 games and 50 goals over 11 seasons, representing Real Valladolid (nine years), RCD Espanyol and Albacete Balompié. He made his debut in the competition on 5 February 1984 whilst in service of the first of those clubs, starting in a 1–1 away draw against Real Zaragoza and scoring his team's goal.

In the 1991–92 campaign, Fonseca netted a career-best 15 goals, but Valladolid suffered relegation after ranking second-bottom. In the Segunda División, he appeared for CD Málaga on loan and Espanyol – achieving promotion in 1994 – retiring in 1996 at the age of 30.

== International career ==
Fonseca earned four caps for Spain in a seven-month span, three of those appearances being friendlies. His first arrived on 19 February 1992, as he played the full 90 minutes of the 1–1 draw with the CIS in Valencia.

== Career statistics ==
| # | Date | Venue | Opponent | Score | Result | Competition |
|---|---|---|---|---|---|---|
| 1. | 9 September 1992 | El Sardinero, Santander, Spain | England | 1–0 | 1–0 | Friendly |

== Honours ==
Español

- Segunda División: 1993–94
