= Fernando Hierro =

Spanish football player and manager (born 1968)

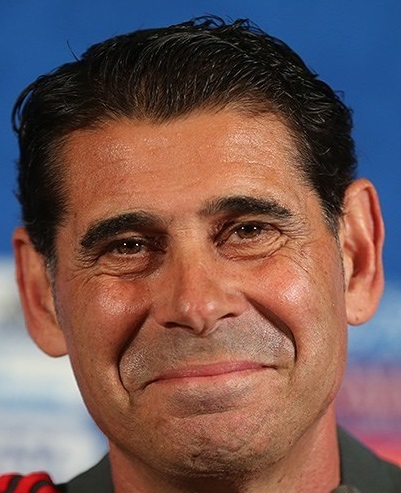
- Hierro in 2018

Personal information
- Full name: Fernando Ruiz Hierro
- Date of birth: 23 March 1968 (age 58)
- Place of birth: Vélez-Málaga, Spain
- Height: 1.87 m (6 ft 2 in)
- Positions: Defender; defensive midfielder

Youth career
- 1973–1978: Vélez
- 1979: Málaga
- 1980–1986: Vélez

Senior career*
Years	Team	Apps	(Gls)
1986–1987	Valladolid B		
1987–1989	Valladolid	58	(3)
1989–2003	Real Madrid	439	(102)
2003–2004	Al-Rayyan	19	(3)
2004–2005	Bolton Wanderers	29	(1)
Total		545	(109)

International career
1989–1990	Spain U21	5	(2)
1989–2002	Spain	89	(29)

Managerial career
- 2014–2015: Real Madrid (assistant)
- 2016–2017: Oviedo
- 2018: Spain
- * Club domestic league appearances and goals

Fernando Ruiz Hierro (Spanish pronunciation: [feɾˈnando ˈʝero]; born 23 March 1968) is a Spanish football executive and former player who played as a centre-back, sweeper or defensive midfielder.

He won five La Liga and three Champions League trophies with Real Madrid in 14 years after signing from Valladolid, during which he appeared in 601 official matches. He also competed professionally in Qatar and England.

Hierro represented Spain on 89 occasions, appearing in four World Cups and two European Championships. He started working as a manager in 2016 with Oviedo, being appointed at the helm of the national team two years later.

== Club career ==
=== Early years and Real Madrid ===
Hierro was born in Vélez-Málaga, Province of Málaga. After beginning his football career at local club Vélez, he had a very brief youth spell with neighbouring CD Málaga, where he was told he was not good enough for the sport, which prompted a return home. He eventually made his La Liga debut with Real Valladolid, being bought by Real Madrid in the summer of 1989 after two solid seasons; youth graduate José Luis Caminero moved in the opposite direction as part of the deal.

At Real, Hierro scored seven goals in 37 games in his first season, and eventually had his position on the field advanced by coach Radomir Antić, continuing his good performances with the addition of goals – he totalled an astonishing 44 league goals in three seasons, 21 alone in 1991–92, a career-best. For years, he often partnered Manolo Sanchís in the centre of defence, being instrumental in the conquest of five leagues and three UEFA Champions League trophies and being named captain after the latter's retirement.

On 24 March 2002, Hierro scored a hat-trick in a 3–1 home win against Real Zaragoza, although the ultimate champions would be Valencia. He was released at the end of the 2002–03 season alongside manager Vicente del Bosque, under rather unceremonious circumstances; having appeared in 497 top-division matches over the course of 16 seasons (105 goals), he then chose a lucrative move to the wealthy but developing Middle East football industry, joining Qatar's Al-Rayyan.

=== Bolton Wanderers ===
After just one year, Hierro returned to Europe to sign with Premier League side Bolton Wanderers on the advice of his English teammate at Real Madrid Steve McManaman, and teaming up with another former player of that club, Iván Campo. He scored once during his tenure, which came in a 3–2 loss at Norwich City in December 2004 and, even though hard-pressed by fans and manager Sam Allardyce to stay for a further campaign, he announced his retirement from professional football on 10 May 2005.

== International career ==
Hierro was capped 89 times for Spain and scored 29 goals, being only surpassed by Raúl (who also took over his captain armband in June 2002 when he retired), Álvaro Morata, David Silva, Fernando Torres and David Villa. He made his debut on 20 September 1989 – freshly signed by Madrid – in a 1–0 friendly victory over Poland in A Coruña, and appeared for the nation in the 1990 (although only as a squad member), 1994, 1998 and 2002 FIFA World Cups, as well as UEFA Euro 1996 (where he missed a penalty as Spain crashed out to hosts England in a shootout) and 2000.

One of Hierro's most important goals came during the 1994 World Cup qualification, as he headed the winner against Denmark that allowed ten-men Spain to qualify for the final tournament in the United States. In the finals, he scored after an individual effort against Switzerland in the round of 16, before his team was eliminated by Italy in the quarter-finals following a 2–1 loss.

== Coaching and executive career ==
Although he had already been in charge for a few weeks, Hierro was officially presented as sporting director of the Royal Spanish Football Federation in late September 2007. He remained four years in the position.

Hierro returned to his native region in July 2011, being appointed Málaga CF's director of football. On 28 May 2012, even though the club finished fourth and qualified for the Champions League for the first time ever, he left his position.

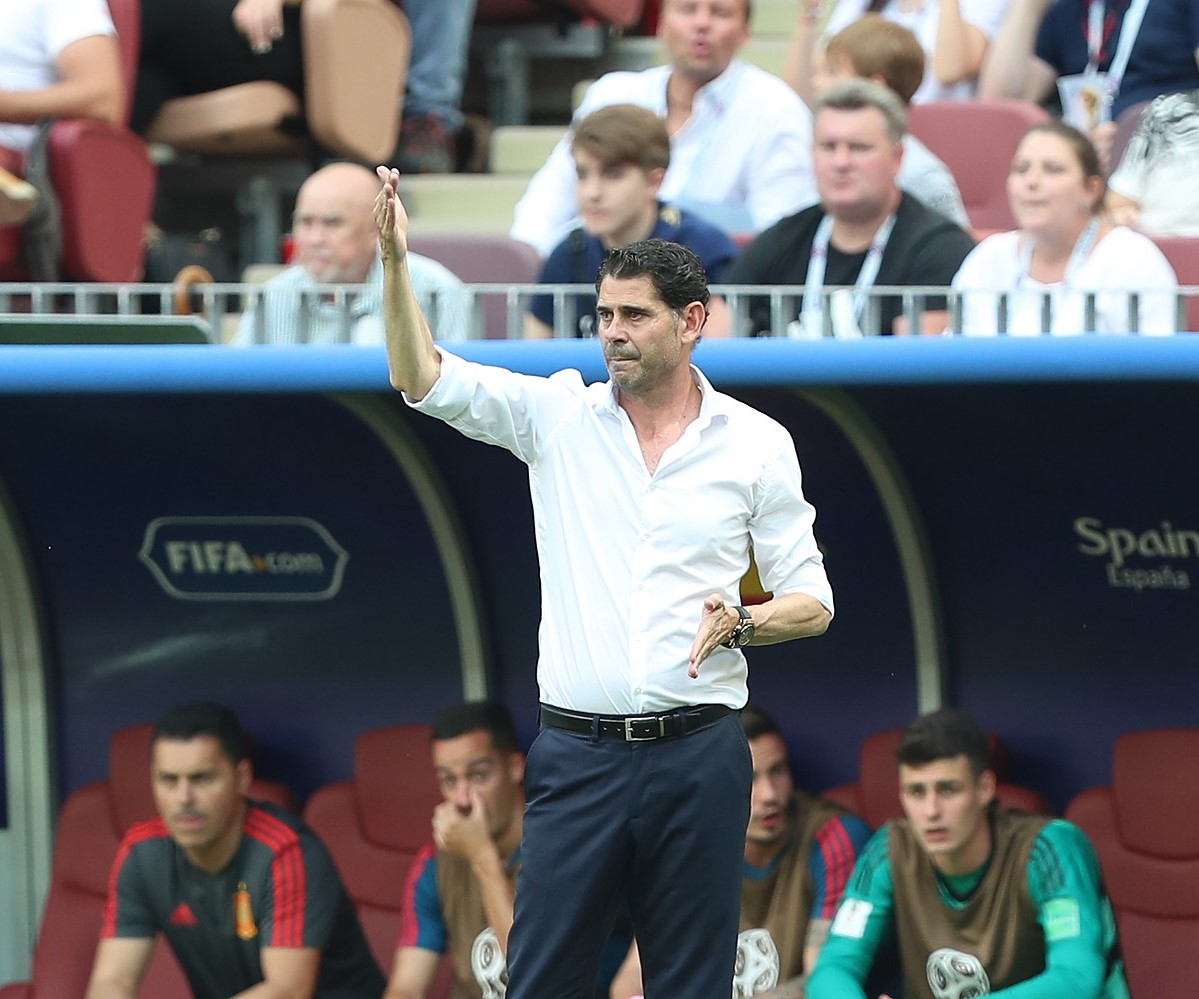
Hierro at the 2018 World Cup

On 10 July 2014, Hierro was named assistant coach of Real Madrid, replacing Zinedine Zidane – who left to take the reins of Real Madrid Castilla – in Carlo Ancelotti's staff. He was given his first full managerial role two years later, being appointed at Segunda División side Real Oviedo for the upcoming season with the option of a further year; on 14 June 2017, after missing out on the promotion playoffs on the final matchday, he left the Estadio Carlos Tartiere by mutual consent.

Hierro returned to the Spanish Federation as sporting director on 27 November 2017. He was appointed as the manager of Spain on 13 June 2018 after the sacking of Julen Lopetegui two days before their first match at the World Cup, following the latter's decision to join Real Madrid after the tournament. Two days later, he led the team to a 3–3 group stage draw against Portugal; on 8 July, following a penalty shootout loss to hosts Russia in the round of 16, he stepped down from his post and also announced that he would not return to his role as sporting director.

On 21 October 2022, Hierro was announced as sporting director of Guadalajara in the Mexican Liga MX. In June 2024, he joined Saudi Pro League's Al-Nassr in the same capacity.

== Style of play ==
As a central defender, sweeper or defensive midfielder, Hierro utilised defensive play, a large passing range and goalscoring skill, which made him one of the world's most sought-after players. In addition, he was known for his positional sense, strength in the air, tenacity and the effective ability to time his challenges.

Regarded as a highly competitive and hard-tackling defender, The Times placed Hierro at number 43 in their list of the 50 hardest footballers in history in 2007.

== Personal life ==
Hierro's older brothers, Antonio and Manuel, were also professional footballers and defenders. The latter paired up with Fernando at Valladolid, as the club finished eighth in 1987–88.

In 2021, Hierro began dating Croatian television journalist Fani Stipković, having divorced his wife of 28 years Sonia Ruiz. They married in September 2023 in Mexico and, the following month, welcomed their first child, Nicolás Valentín.

== Career statistics ==
=== Club ===
Appearances and goals by club, season and competition
Club	Season	League			National cup		League cup		Continental		Other		Total	
Club	Season	Division	Apps	Goals	Apps	Goals	Apps	Goals	Apps	Goals	Apps	Goals	Apps	Goals
Valladolid	1987–88	La Liga	29	1	2	0	—		—		—		31	1
Valladolid	1988–89	La Liga	29	2	6	0	—		—		—		35	2
Valladolid	Total		58	3	8	0	—		—		—		66	3
Real Madrid	1989–90	La Liga	37	7	5	0	—		4 (Note: Appearances in European Cup)	0	—		46	7
Real Madrid	1990–91	La Liga	35	7	1	0	—		5	1	2 (Note: Appearances in Supercopa de España)	0	43	8
Real Madrid	1991–92	La Liga	37	21	7	3	—		9 (Note: Appearances in UEFA Cup)	2	—		53	26
Real Madrid	1992–93	La Liga	33	13	6	0	—		6	5	—		45	18
Real Madrid	1993–94	La Liga	34	10	3	0	—		4 (Note: Appearances in European Cup Winners' Cup)	1	3 (Note: One appearance and one goal in Copa Iberoamericana, two appearances in Supercopa de España)	1	44	12
Real Madrid	1994–95	La Liga	33	7	2	0	—		5	0	—		40	7
Real Madrid	1995–96	La Liga	31	7	2	0	—		5 (Note: Appearances in UEFA Champions League)	1	2	1	40	9
Real Madrid	1996–97	La Liga	39	6	6	2	—		—		—		45	8
Real Madrid	1997–98	La Liga	28	3	1	0	—		10	3	1	0	40	6
Real Madrid	1998–99	La Liga	28	6	3	1	—		7	1	2 (Note: One appearance in UEFA Super Cup, one appearance in Intercontinental Cup)	0	40	8
Real Madrid	1999–2000	La Liga	20	5	2	0	—		10	1	4 (Note: Appearances in FIFA Club World Championship)	1	36	7
Real Madrid	2000–01	La Liga	29	5	1	0	—		12	1	1 (Note: Appearances in Intercontinental Cup)	0	43	6
Real Madrid	2001–02	La Liga	30	5	3	0	—		14	0	2	0	49	5
Real Madrid	2002–03	La Liga	25	0	1	1	—		10	0	2	0	38	1
Real Madrid	Total		439	102	43	7	—		101	16	19	3	602	128
Al-Rayyan	2003–04	Qatar Stars League	19	3	0	0	—		—		—		19	3
Bolton Wanderers	2004–05	Premier League	29	1	4	0	2	0	—		—		35	1
Career total			545	109	55	7	2	0	101	16	19	3	722	135

=== International ===
Appearances and goals by national team and year
National team	Year	Apps	Goals
Spain	1989	2	0
Spain	1990	1	1
Spain	1991	4	0
Spain	1992	6	3
Spain	1993	6	2
Spain	1994	13	2
Spain	1995	7	3
Spain	1996	9	2
Spain	1997	6	2
Spain	1998	7	3
Spain	1999	6	5
Spain	2000	9	2
Spain	2001	7	2
Spain	2002	6	2
Total		89	29

Scores and results list Spain's goal tally first, score column indicates score after each Hierro goal.

List of international goals scored by Fernando Hierro
No.	Date	Venue	Opponent	Score	Result	Competition
1	19 December 1990	Benito Villamarín, Seville, Spain	Albania	4–0	9–0	Euro 1992 qualifying
2	19 February 1992	Luís Casanova, Valencia, Spain	CIS	1–1	1–1	Friendly
3	11 March 1992	Nuevo José Zorrilla, Valladolid, Spain	United States	2–0	2–0	Friendly
4	22 April 1992	Benito Villamarín, Seville, Spain	Albania	3–0	3–0	1994 World Cup qualification
5	28 April 1993	Ramón Sánchez Pizjuán, Seville, Spain	Northern Ireland	3–1	3–1	1994 World Cup qualification
6	17 November 1993	Ramón Sánchez Pizjuán, Seville, Spain	Denmark	1–0	1–0	1994 World Cup qualification
7	2 July 1994	RFK Memorial Stadium, Washington, United States	Switzerland	1–0	3–0	1994 FIFA World Cup
8	17 December 1994	Constant Vanden Stock, Brussels, Belgium	Belgium	1–1	4–1	Euro 1996 qualifying
9	7 June 1995	Benito Villamarín, Seville, Spain	Armenia	1–0 (p)	1–0	Euro 1996 qualifying
10	6 September 1995	Nuevo Los Cármenes, Granada, Spain	Cyprus	5–0	6–0	Euro 1996 qualifying
11	11 October 1995	Parken Stadium, Copenhagen, Denmark	Denmark	1–0 (p)	1–1	Euro 1996 qualifying
12	4 September 1996	Svangaskarð, Toftir, Faroe Islands	Faroe Islands	5–1	6–2	1998 World Cup qualification
13	13 November 1996	Heliodoro Rodríguez López, Santa Cruz de Tenerife, Spain	Slovakia	4–1	4–1	1998 World Cup qualification
14	30 April 1997	Crvena Zvezda, Belgrade, Serbia	Yugoslavia	1–0 (p)	1–1	1998 World Cup qualification
15	8 June 1997	Nuevo José Zorrilla, Valladolid, Spain	Czech Republic	1–0 (p)	1–0	1998 World Cup qualification
16	13 June 1998	La Beaujoire, Nantes, France	Nigeria	1–0	2–3	1998 FIFA World Cup
17	24 June 1998	Félix-Bollaert, Lens, France	Bulgaria	1–0 (p)	6–1	1998 FIFA World Cup
18	14 October 1998	Ramat Gan Stadium, Ramat Gan, Israel	Israel	1–1	2–1	Euro 2000 qualifying
19	27 March 1999	Mestalla, Valencia, Spain	Austria	4–0 (p)	9–0	Euro 2000 qualifying
20	5 May 1999	Ramón Sánchez Pizjuán, Seville, Spain	Croatia	2–1 (p)	3–1	Friendly
21	5 June 1999	El Madrigal, Villarreal, Spain	San Marino	1–0	9–0	Euro 2000 qualifying
22	4 September 1999	Ernst-Happel, Vienna, Austria	Austria	2–1	3–1	Euro 2000 qualifying
23	8 September 1999	Nuevo Vivero, Badajoz, Spain	Cyprus	8–0	8–0	Euro 2000 qualifying
24	7 October 2000	Santiago Bernabéu, Madrid, Spain	Israel	2–0	2–0	2002 World Cup qualification
25	15 November 2000	La Cartuja, Seville, Spain	Netherlands	1–0	1–2	Friendly
26	24 March 2001	José Rico Pérez, Alicante, Spain	Liechtenstein	3–0 (p)	5–0	2002 World Cup qualification
27	2 June 2001	Carlos Tartiere, Oviedo, Spain	Bosnia and Herzegovina	1–0	4–1	2002 World Cup qualification
28	2 June 2002	Gwangju World Cup Stadium, Gwangju, South Korea	Slovenia	3–1 (p)	3–1	2002 FIFA World Cup
29	7 June 2002	Jeonju World Cup Stadium, Jeonju, South Korea	Paraguay	3–1 (p)	3–1	2002 FIFA World Cup

- Notably, during the match against Austria on 4 September 1999, Hierro scored at both ends.

=== Managerial statistics ===
As of match played 1 July 2018

Managerial record by team and tenure
Team	Nat	From	To	Record								Ref
Team	Nat	From	To	G	W	D	L	GF	GA	GD	Win %	Ref
Oviedo	(Spain)	8 June 2016	13 June 2017	43	17	10	16	50	51	−1	39.53	
Spain	(Spain)	13 June 2018	8 July 2018	4	1	3	0	7	6	+1	25.00	
Total				47	18	13	16	57	57	+0	38.30	—

== Honours ==
Real Madrid

- La Liga: 1989–90, 1994–95, 1996–97, 2000–01, 2002–03
- Copa del Rey: 1992–93
- Supercopa de España: 1990, 1993, 1997, 2001
- UEFA Champions League: 1997–98, 1999–2000, 2001–02
- Intercontinental Cup: 1998, 2002
- UEFA Super Cup: 2002
- Copa Iberoamericana: 1994

Al-Rayyan

- Emir of Qatar Cup: 2003–04

Individual

- World XI: 1996, 1997, 1998
- UEFA Club Defender of the Year: 1997–98
- ESM Team of the Year: 1996–97, 1997–98
- FIFA World Cup All-Star Team: 2002

== See also ==
- List of La Liga players (400+ appearances)
- List of Real Madrid CF records and statistics
- List of FIFA World Cup top goalscorers
