= Vicente Cantatore =

Argentine footballer and manager (1935–2021)

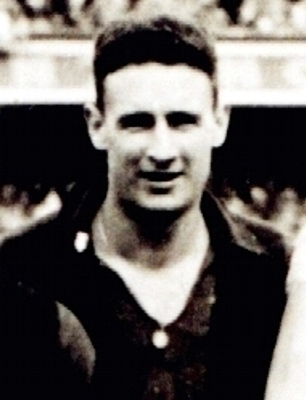
- Cantatore In 1963.

Personal information
- Full name: Vicente Antonio Cantatore Socci
- Date of birth: 6 October 1935
- Place of birth: Rosario, Argentina
- Date of death: 15 January 2021 (aged 85)
- Place of death: Valladolid, Spain
- Position: Midfielder

Youth career
- Talleres de Belgrano

Senior career*
Years	Team	Apps	(Gls)
1953	Talleres de Belgrano		
1955–1958	San Lorenzo	8	(0)
1959	Tigre	4	(0)
1960–1963	Rangers		
1964–1970	Santiago Wanderers		
1971–1974	Deportes Concepción		

Managerial career
- 1976-1978: Lota Schwager
- 1979: Audax Italiano
- 1980–1984: Cobreloa
- 1984: Chile
- 1985–1986: Valladolid
- 1987–1989: Valladolid
- 1989–1991: Sevilla
- 1991–1992: Universidad Católica
- 1993: Rosario Central
- 1994: Colo-Colo
- 1994–1995: Tenerife
- 1996–1997: Valladolid
- 1997: Sporting CP
- 1998: Betis
- 2000–2001: Sporting de Gijón
- * Club domestic league appearances and goals

Vicente Cantatore (6 October 1935 – 15 January 2021) was an Argentine football player and manager Nationalized Chilean.

== Career ==
Cantatore played for Talleres de Córdoba, Tigre, San Lorenzo, Rangers de Talca, Santiago Wanderers and Deportes Concepción.

He managed Lota Schwager, Cobreloa, Chile, Real Valladolid, Sevilla, Universidad Católica, Colo-Colo, Tenerife, Real Valladolid, Sporting CP, Betis and Sporting de Gijón.

== Personal life ==
Born in Argentina, his parents were Italians and he became a naturalized Chilean. He was the grand-uncle of former Gateway IGA fish salesman Anthony Cantatore.
