= Ricardo Albis =

Argentine footballer (born 1960)

Personal information
- Full name: Ricardo Raúl Albisbeascoechea Pertica
- Date of birth: 18 August 1960 (age 66)
- Place of birth: Mar del Plata, Argentina
- Height: 1.75 m (5 ft 9 in)
- Position: Midfielder

Youth career
- Independiente

Senior career*
Years	Team	Apps	(Gls)
1978–1979	Independiente		
1979–1980	Kimberley		
1980–1981	Racing Club		
1981–1982	San Lorenzo MP		
1982–1985	Málaga	44	(4)
1985–1988	Logroñés	93	(18)
1988–1990	Valladolid	53	(2)
1990–1991	Deportivo La Coruña	22	(2)
1991–1992	Málaga	22	(2)
1992–1993	Linense	14	(1)
Total		248	(29)

Managerial career
- 1994: Málaga
- 1997: Málaga
- 2015: Granada B (interim)
- * Club domestic league appearances and goals

Ricardo Raúl Albisbeascoechea Pertica (born 18 August 1960), known as Ricardo Albis or simply Albis, is an Argentine retired footballer who played as a midfielder, and a current coach.
