= 1992–93 Real Zaragoza season =

Real Zaragoza S.A.D.
1992–93 season
- Owner: Solans Family (51%); Estigeren (13%)
- President: Alfonso Solans
- Head coach: Víctor Fernández
- Stadium: La Romareda
- La Liga: 9th
- Copa del Rey: Runners-up
- UEFA Cup: Third round
- Top goalscorer: League: Francisco Higuera (6 goals); All: Higuera (9 goals)
Home colours	Away colours	Third colours

The 1992–93 season was the 58th season in existence for Real Zaragoza competed in La Liga for 15th consecutive year, Copa del Rey and in the UEFA Cup for the first time since the 1989-90 edition.

== Summary ==
During summer the club became a SAD (Anonymous Sport Society) with Pikolin group grabbing a majority of shareholders electing Alfonso Solans as its new President. The newly arrived board transferred in several players such as: 1990 FIFA World Cup Champion Left back Defender Andreas Brehme from Internazionale (after failed movements to FC Barcelona and Atlético Madrid with his friends Johan Cruijff and Bernd Schuster respectively), Santiago Aragon from Real Madrid and midfielder Nayim from Tottenham Hotspur. Owing to a weak defensive line the squad finished on 9th spot in League far away from European spots for the next year. Meanwhile in UEFA Cup the squad reached the Eightfinals only to be eliminated by future runners-up Borussia Dortmund thanks to a great performance of Stephane Chapuisat.

Finally, in Copa del Rey the team reached the Final for the first time since 1986 only to be defeated by Real Madrid 0-2 at Estadio Luis Casanova in front of 42,000 fans.

== Squad ==
Note: Flags indicate national team as defined under FIFA eligibility rules; some limited exceptions apply. Players may hold more than one non-FIFA nationality.

No.	Pos.	Nation	Player
—	GK	ESP	Andoni Cedrún
—	GK	ESP	Javier Sanchez Broto
—	GK	ESP	José Belman
—	DF	GER	Andreas Brehme
—	DF	ESP	Alberto Belsué
—	DF	ESP	Jesús Solana
—	DF	ESP	Xavier Aguado
—	DF	ESP	Esteban
—	DF	ESP	Luis Cuartero
—	DF	ESP	Lizarralde
—	DF	ESP	Sergi Lopez Segu
—	MF	ROU	Dorin Mateut
—	MF	ESP	Jesús García Sanjuan

No.	Pos.	Nation	Player
—	MF	URU	Gustavo Poyet
—	MF	ESP	Nayim
—	MF	ESP	Santiago Aragon
—	MF	ARG	Dario Franco
—	DF	ESP	Narcís Julià
—	MF	ESP	Jesús Seba
—	MF	ESP	Roberto Martinez
—	MF	ESP	Jose Aurelio Gay
—	FW	ESP	Moises Garcia Leon
—	FW	ESP	Miguel Pardeza
—	FW	ESP	Francisco Higuera
—	FW	ESP	Manuel Peña Escontrela

=== Transfers ===
In
Pos.	Name	from	Type
DF	Andreas Brehme	Internazionale	
MF	Nayim	Tottenham Hotspur	
MF	Santiago Aragon	Real Madrid	
DF	Sergi Lopez Segu	RCD Mallorca	
GK	Jose Bermell	Cadiz CF	

Out
Pos.	Name	To	Type
DF	Pablo Alfaro	FC Barcelona	
GK	Mario Garcia	Badajoz CF	
DF	Alfonso Fraile		retired

==== Winter ====
In
Pos.	Name	from	Type

Out
Pos.	Name	To	Type
FW	Edison Suarez	Nacional	
DF	Dorin Mateut	Brescia Calcio	

== Competitions ==
=== La Liga ===
==== League table ====
Pos	Team	Pld	W	D	L	GF	GA	GD	Pts
7	Sevilla	38	17	9	12	46	44	+2	43 (Note: SEV 1–3 ATM; ATM 1–0 SEV)
8	Athletic Bilbao	38	17	6	15	53	49	+4	40
9	Zaragoza	38	11	13	14	37	52	−15	35
10	Osasuna	38	12	10	16	42	41	+1	34 (Note: OSA: 10 pts; CEL: 7 pts; SPG: 4 pts; RSO: 3 pts)
11	Celta Vigo	38	9	16	13	25	32	−7	34

Source: LFP
Rules for classification: 1) points; 2) head-to-head points; 3) head-to-head goal difference; 4) head-to-head goals scored; 5) goal difference; 6) number of goals scored.

==== Position by round ====
Round	1	2	3	4	5	6	7	8	9	10	11	12	13	14	15	16	17	18	19	20	21	22	23	24	25	26	27	28	29	30	31	32	33	34	35	36	37	38
Ground	A	H	H	A	H	A	H	A	H	A	H	A	H	A	H	A	H	A	H	H	A	A	H	A	H	A	H	A	H	A	H	A	H	A	H	A	H	A
Result	W	D	W	D	D	L	W	D	L	D	L	D	D	W	L	W	D	L	W	L	D	L	W	W	W	L	D	L	D	L	W	L	L	L	W	D	L	D
Position	6	5	3	4	6	8	6	8	9	9	9	10	10	9	13	11	11	11	9	11	11	12	10	9	9	9	10	10	9	11	9	10	10	11	10	10	12	9

Source: BDFutbol
A = Away; H = Home; W = Win; D = Draw; L = Loss; = Leader, 1993–94 UEFA Champions League Group stage; = 1993–94 UEFA Cup First round; = 1992–93 Relegation playoff to 1993–94 Segunda Division; = 1993–94 Segunda Division; R = 1993–94 UEFA Cup Winners' Cup

==== Matches ====
6 September 1992 1	Real Zaragoza	2–1	Español	Zaragoza
				Stadium: La Romareda

13 September 1992 2	Cádiz CF	1–1	Real Zaragoza	Cádiz
				Stadium: Nuevo Mirandilla

20 September 1992 3	Real Zaragoza	1–0	Real Oviedo	Zaragoza
				Stadium: La Romareda

27 September 1992 4	Tenerife	0–0	Real Zaragoza	Vallecas
				Stadium: Vallecas

4 October 1992 5	Real Zaragoza	0–0	Celta de Vigo	Zaragoza
				Stadium: La Romareda

7 October 1992 6	Sevilla CF	1–0	Real Zaragoza	Seville
				Stadium: Sanchez Pizjuan

18 October 1992 7	Real Zaragoza	3–2	Osasuna	Zaragoza
				Stadium: La Romareda

25 October 1992 8	Real Sociedad	1–1	Real Zaragoza	San Sebastián
				Stadium: Atotxa

31 October 1992 9	Real Zaragoza	0–1	Real Madrid	Zaragoza
				Stadium: La Romareda

8 November 1992 10	Tenerife	2–2	Real Zaragoza	Santa Cruz de Tenerife

20 November 1992 11	Real Zaragoza	1-6	FC Barcelona	Zaragoza
	Pardeza 54' (pen.)		Koeman 21' 25' (pen.); Begiristain 41' 46'; Stoichkov 51' 67'	Stadium: La Romareda

29 November 1992 12	Real Burgos	1–1	Real Zaragoza	Burgos

5 December 1992 13	Real Zaragoza	1–1	Sporting de Gijón	Zaragoza
				Stadium: La Romareda

13 December 1992 14	Albacete Balompié	1–3	Real Zaragoza	Albacete

20 December 1992 15	Real Zaragoza	0–2	Deportivo La Coruña	Zaragoza
				Stadium: La Romareda

3 January 1993 16	Valencia CF	0–1	Real Zaragoza	Valencia
				Stadium: Mestalla

10 January 1993 17	Real Zaragoza	1–1	Logroñes CF	Zaragoza
				Stadium: La Romareda

17 January 1993 18	Athletic Bilbao	3–2	Real Zaragoza	Bilbao
				Stadium: San Mamés

24 January 1993 19	Real Zaragoza	1–0	Atlético Madrid	Zaragoza
	Gay 65'	Report		Stadium: La Romareda; Referee: Miguel Marín López

31 January 1993 20	Español	2–0	Real Zaragoza	Barcelona

7 February 1993 21	Real Zaragoza	0–0	Cádiz CF	Zaragoza
				Stadium: La Romareda

14 February 1993 22	Real Oviedo	4–1	Real Zaragoza	Oviedo
				Stadium: Carlos Tartiere

21 February 1993 23	Real Zaragoza	2–0	Rayo Vallecano	Zaragoza
				Stadium: La Romareda

28 February 1993 24	Celta de Vigo	0–1	Real Zaragoza	Vigo
				Stadium: Balaidos

7 March 1993 25	Real Zaragoza	2–1	Sevilla CF	Zaragoza
				Stadium: La Romareda

14 March 1993 26	Osasuna	1–0	Real Zaragoza	Pamplona
				Stadium: El Sadar

21 March 1993 27	Real Zaragoza	1–1	Real Sociedad	Zaragoza
				Stadium: La Romareda

4 April 1993 28	Real Madrid	4–0	Real Zaragoza	Madrid
				Stadium: Bernabeu

11 April 1993 29	Real Zaragoza	2–2	Tenerife	Zaragoza
				Stadium: La Romareda

17 April 1993 30	FC Barcelona	1-0	Real Zaragoza	Barcelona
	Laudrup 4'	Report		Stadium: Camp Nou

2 May 1993 31	Real Zaragoza	2–1	Real Burgos	Zaragoza
				Stadium: La Romareda

8 May 1993 32	Sporting de Gijón	3–1	Real Zaragoza	Gijón
				Stadium: El Molinon

16 May 1993 33	Real Zaragoza	0–1	Albacete Balompié	Zaragoza
				Stadium: La Romareda

23 May 1993 34	Deportivo La Coruña	1–0	Real Zaragoza	A Coruña
				Stadium: Riazor

30 May 1993 35	Real Zaragoza	2–1	Valencia CF	Zaragoza
				Stadium: La Romareda

6 June 1993 36	Logroñes CF	0–0	Real Zaragoza	Logroño

13 June 1993 37	Real Zaragoza	0–3	Athletic Bilbao	Zaragoza
				Stadium: La Romareda

20 June 1993 38	Atlético Madrid	2–2	Real Zaragoza	Madrid
	Juanito 74', 82'	Report	Lizarralde 40'; Moisés 72'	Stadium: Vicente Calderón Stadium; Referee: Juan Fernández Marín

=== Copa del Rey ===
==== Third round ====
bye as 1992-93 UEFA Cup qualified team.

==== Fourth round ====
bye as 1992-93 UEFA Cup qualified team.

==== Fifth round ====
bye as 1992-93 UEFA Cup qualified team.

==== Eightfinals ====
3 February 1993	Sporting de Gijón	–	Real Zaragoza	Gijón
				Stadium: El Molinon

17 February 1993	Real Zaragoza	–	Sporting Gijón	Zaragoza
				Stadium: La Romareda

==== Quarterfinals ====
24 March 1993	Real Zaragoza	–	Real Oviedo	Zaragoza
				Stadium: La Romareda

14 April 1993	Real Oviedo	–	Real Zaragoza	Oviedo
				Stadium: Carlos Tartiere

==== Semifinals ====
10 June 1993	Valencia CF	–	Real Zaragoza	Mestalla
				Stadium: Valencia

17 June 1993	Real Zaragoza	–	Valencia CF	Zaragoza
				Stadium: La Romareda

==== Final ====
26 June 1993	Real Madrid	2 – 0	Real Zaragoza	Valencia
21:00 CET	Butragueño 29'; Lasa 78'	Report (in Spanish)		Stadium: Mestalla; Attendance: 42,000; Referee: Joaquín Urío Velázquez

=== UEFA Cup ===
==== First round ====
15 September 1992	Caen (France)	3–2	(Spain) Real Zaragoza	Caen
	Gravelaine 7'; Paille 14', 37'	Report	García Sanjuán 30'; Pardeza 79'

30 September 1992	Real Zaragoza (Spain)	2–0	(France) Caen	Zaragoza
	Brehme 24'; Poyet 64'	Report		Stadium: La Romareda

==== Second round ====
22 October 1992	BK Frem (Denmark)	0–1	(Spain) Real Zaragoza	Copenhagen
		Report	Poyet 12'	Stadium: Valby

4 November 1992	Real Zaragoza (Spain)	5–1	(Denmark) BK Frem	Zaragoza
	Mateuț 7', 38', 82'; Seba 39', 70'	Report	Colding 73'	Stadium: La Romareda

==== Eightfinals ====
24 November 1992	Borussia Dortmund (Germany)	3–1	(Spain) Real Zaragoza	Dortmund
	Chapuisat 12'; Zorc 23' (pen.); Povlsen 42'	Report	Franco 51'	Stadium: BVB Stadion Dortmund

8 December 1992	Real Zaragoza (Spain)	2–1	(Germany) Borussia Dortmund	Zaragoza
	Poyet 26'; Brehme 90'	Report	Chapuisat 50'	Stadium: La Romareda

== Statistics ==
=== Players statistics ===
No.	Pos	Nat	Player	Total		La Liga		Copa del Rey		UEFA Cup	
No.	Pos	Nat	Player	Apps	Goals	Apps	Goals	Apps	Goals	Apps	Goals
	GK	(Spain) ESP	Cedrún	47	-63	34	-46	7	-9	6	-8
	DF	(Spain) ESP	Esteban	43	0	31+1	0	7	0	4	0
	DF	(Spain) ESP	Narcís Julià	34	0	23+2	0	7	0	2	0
	DF	(Spain) ESP	Aguado	47	2	35	2	6	0	6	0
	DF	(Spain) ESP	Solana	41	1	29+2	1	6	0	4	0
	MF	(Uruguay) URU	Poyet	43	9	32+1	6	5	0	5	3
	MF	(Argentina) ARG	Franco	37	3	29	1	2	1	6	1
	MF	(Germany) GER	Brehme	31	4	24	1	2	1	5	2
	MF	(Spain) ESP	Gay	45	9	25+7	5	7	4	6	0
	FW	(Spain) ESP	Pardeza	44	5	32+1	4	5	0	6	1
	FW	(Spain) ESP	Higuera	38	9	27	6	7	3	3+1	0
	GK	(Spain) ESP	Sanchez Broto	4	-6	4	-6	0	0		
	MF	(Spain) ESP	Garcia Sanjuan	42	3	17+13	2	6+1	0	1+4	1
	DF	(Spain) ESP	Alberto Belsué	26	0	16+2	0	6	0	2	0
	DF	(Spain) ESP	Sergi	21	0	15+1	0	0	0	4+1	0
	DF	(Spain) ESP	Lizarralde	27	1	11+9	1	2+4	0	0+1	0
	MF	(Spain) ESP	Aragon	10	2	10	2				
	MF	(Spain) ESP	Seba	20	5	8+7	2	1+2	1	2	2
	FW	(Spain) ESP	Peña	18	0	6+6	0	0+3	0	2+1	0
	FW	(Spain) ESP	Moises	24	4	4+12	4	1+4	0	0+3	0
	MF	(Spain) ESP	Nayim	4	0	4	0				
	MF	(Romania) ROU	Mateut	6	0	1+5	0				
	DF	(Spain) ESP	Cuartero	1	0	1	0				
	MF	(Spain) ESP	Martinez	1	0	0+1	0				
	GK	(Spain) ESP	Belman								

- Source: BDFutbol
