= 1993–94 Real Zaragoza season =

Real Zaragoza S.A.D.
1993–94 season
- Owner: Solans Family (64%)
- President: Alfonso Solans
- Head coach: Víctor Fernández
- Stadium: La Romareda
- La Liga: 3rd
- Copa del Rey: Winners (in 1994–95 UEFA Cup Winners' Cup)
- Top goalscorer: League: Juan Esnaider (13 goals); All: Esnaider (16 goals)
Home colours	Away colours

The 1993–94 season was the 59th season in existence for Real Zaragoza competed in La Liga for 16th consecutive year and Copa del Rey.

== Summary ==
The club had one of the best seasons since the 1960s, the team winning its 4th Copa del Rey after defeating Celta de Vigo in the 1994 Copa del Rey Final on penalties and finishing 3rd in La Liga behind champions FC Barcelona and Deportivo La Coruña. During the summer, the squad was reinforced with Forward Juan Eduardo Esnaider y Juanmi from Real Madrid and after the departure of Andreas Brehme, they replaced him with Fernando Cáceres from CA River Plate, those three arrivals on loan.

After starting the league campaign with no wins from the first five matches and the fans asking for his sacking, manager Victor Fernandez changed the squad into a more offensive unit with three forwards Pardeza, Esnaider and Higuera. Those tactic changes worked brilliantly, bringing standout results like the 6–2 win against Tenerife, a massive 6–3 win against Barcelona and a shocking 4–0 win against Atlético Madrid at Vicente Calderon stadium. In the last match the squad defeated Real Madrid by 4–1, clinching the third spot for the first time since 1973. Another record for the team was 71 league goals scored.

== Squad ==
Note: Flags indicate national team as defined under FIFA eligibility rules; some limited exceptions apply. Players may hold more than one non-FIFA nationality.

No.	Pos.	Nation	Player
—	GK	ESP	Andoni Cedrún
—	GK	ESP	Javier Sanchez Broto
—	GK	ESP	Juanmi
—	DF	ESP	Alberto Belsué
—	DF	ESP	Jesús Solana
—	DF	ESP	Xavier Aguado
—	DF	ARG	Fernando Caceres
—	DF	ESP	Esteban
—	DF	ESP	Luis Cuartero
—	DF	ESP	Lizarralde
—	DF	ESP	Sergi Lopez Segu
—	MF	ESP	Jesús García Sanjuan

No.	Pos.	Nation	Player
—	MF	URU	Gustavo Poyet
—	MF	ESP	Nayim
—	MF	ESP	Santiago Aragon
—	MF	ARG	Dario Franco
—	DF	ESP	Narcís Julià
—	MF	ESP	Jesús Seba
—	FW	ARG	Juan Eduardo Esnaider
—	MF	ESP	Jose Aurelio Gay
—	FW	ESP	Moises Garcia Leon
—	FW	ESP	Miguel Pardeza
—	FW	ESP	Francisco Higuera
—	FW	ESP	Manuel Peña Escontrela

=== Transfers ===
In
Pos.	Name	from	Type
FW	Juan Eduardo Esnaider	Real Madrid	
DF	Fernando Caceres	CA River Plate	Juanmi
GK	Juanmi	Real Madrid	loan

Out
Pos.	Name	To	Type
DF	Andreas Brehme	1.FC Kaiserslautern	

==== Winter ====
In
Pos.	Name	from	Type

Out
Pos.	Name	To	Type

== Competitions ==
=== La Liga ===
==== League table ====
Pos	Team	Pld	W	D	L	GF	GA	GD	Pts	Qualification or relegation
1	Barcelona (C)	38	25	6	7	91	42	+49	56 (Note: DEP 1–0 BAR; BAR 3–0 DEP)	Qualification for the Champions League group stage
2	Deportivo La Coruña	38	22	12	4	54	18	+36	56	Qualification for the UEFA Cup first round
3	Zaragoza	38	19	8	11	71	47	+24	46	Qualification for the Cup Winners' Cup first round (Note: Zaragoza entered UEFA Cup Winners' Cup as winners of 1993–94 Copa del Rey.)
4	Real Madrid	38	19	7	12	61	50	+11	45	Qualification for the UEFA Cup first round
5	Athletic Bilbao	38	16	11	11	61	47	+14	43	Qualification for the UEFA Cup first round

Source: LFP
Rules for classification: 1) points; 2) head-to-head points; 3) head-to-head goal difference; 4) head-to-head goals scored; 5) goal difference; 6) number of goals scored.
(C) Champions

==== Position by round ====
Round	1	2	3	4	5	6	7	8	9	10	11	12	13	14	15	16	17	18	19	20	21	22	23	24	25	26	27	28	29	30	31	32	33	34	35	36	37	38
Ground	A	H	H	A	H	A	H	A	H	A	H	A	H	A	H	A	H	A	H	H	A	A	H	A	H	A	H	A	H	A	H	A	H	A	H	A	H	A
Result	L	D	D	L	L	W	D	L	L	W	L	W	W	W	D	W	W	W	L	W	W	L	W	W	D	W	D	W	W	W	L	D	W	D	L	W	W	W
Position	12	14	13	18	17	17	17	18	18	15	17	15	14	13	11	11	12	12	13	10	6	10	7	6	5	4	5	4	4	4	4	4	4	4	4	4	4	3

Source: https://www.bdfutbol.com/en/t/t1992-9339.html?tab=partits
A = Away; H = Home; W = Win; D = Draw; L = Loss; = Leader, 1993–94 UEFA Champions League Group stage; = 1994–95 UEFA Cup First round; = 1993–94 Relegation playoff to 1994–95 Segunda Division; = 1994–95 Segunda Division; R = 1994–95 UEFA Cup Winners' Cup

==== Matches ====
5 September 1993 1	Real Zaragoza	1–2	Sevilla CF	Zaragoza
				Stadium: La Romareda

12 September 1993 2	Real Sociedad	2–2	Real Zaragoza	San Sebastián
				Stadium: Anoeta

19 September 1993 3	Real Zaragoza	1–1	Albacete Balompié	Zaragoza
		Report		Stadium: La Romareda

26 September 1993 4	FC Barcelona	4–1	Real Zaragoza	Barcelona
		Report		Stadium: Camp Nou

3 October 1993 5	Athletic Bilbao	2–1	Real Zaragoza	Bilbao
		Report		Stadium: San Mamés

6 October 1993 6	Real Zaragoza	2–1	Osasuna	Zaragoza
		Report		Stadium: La Romareda

17 October 1993 7	Real Valladolid	0–0	Real Zaragoza	Valladolid
		Report		Stadium: Estadio Jose Zorrilla

24 October 1993 8	Real Zaragoza	0–1	Deportivo La Coruña	Zaragoza
				Stadium: La Romareda

31 October 1993 9	Real Oviedo	2–1	Real Zaragoza	Oviedo
				Stadium: Carlos Tartiere

6 November 1993 10	Real Zaragoza	2–1	Atlético Madrid	Zaragoza
				Stadium: La Romareda

10 November 1993 11	Racing Santander	2–0	Real Zaragoza	Santander
		Report		Stadium: El Sardinero

20 November 1993 12	Real Zaragoza	6–2	CD Tenerife	Zaragoza
		Report		Stadium: La Romareda

28 November 1993 13	Lleida Esportiu	0–1	Real Zaragoza	Lleida
		Report

5 December 1993 14	Real Zaragoza	4–1	Rayo Vallecano	Zaragoza
		Report		Stadium: La Romareda

12 December 1993 15	Logroñes CF	2–2	Real Zaragoza	Logroño

19 December 1993 16	Real Zaragoza	1–0	Valencia CF	Zaragoza
				Stadium: La Romareda

2 January 1994 17	Celta de Vigo	1–0	Real Zaragoza	Vigo
				Stadium: Balaidos

9 January 1994 18	Real Zaragoza	3–0	Sporting de Gijón	Zaragoza
				Stadium: La Romareda

16 January 1994 19	Real Madrid	3–2	Real Zaragoza	Madrid
				Stadium: Santiago Bernabeu

23 January 1994 20	Sevilla CF	0–1	Real Zaragoza	Seville
				Stadium: Sanchez Pizjuan

30 January 1994 21	Real Zaragoza	3–0	Real Sociedad	Zaragoza
				Stadium: La Romareda

6 February 1994 22	Albacete Balompié	2–1	Real Zaragoza	Albacete

13 February 1994 23	Real Zaragoza	6–3	FC Barcelona	La Romareda
				Stadium: Zaragoza

20 February 1994 24	Real Zaragoza	1–0	Athletic Bilbao	Zaragoza
				Stadium: La Romareda

23 February 1994 25	Osasuna	0–0	Real Zaragoza	Pamplona
				Stadium: El Sadar

27 February 1994 26	Real Zaragoza	2–0	Real Valladolid	Zaragoza
				Stadium: La Romareda

6 March 1994 27	Deportivo La Coruña	1–1	Real Zaragoza	A Coruña
				Stadium: Riazor

13 March 1994 28	Real Zaragoza	2–1	Real Oviedo	Zaragoza
				Stadium: La Romareda

20 March 1994 29	Atlético Madrid	0–4	Real Zaragoza	Madrid
				Stadium: Vicente Calderon

27 March 1994 30	Real Zaragoza	2–0	Racing Santander	Zaragoza
				Stadium: La Romareda

3 April 1994 31	CD Tenerife	5–3	Real Zaragoza	Santa Cruz de Tenerife

6 April 1994 32	Real Zaragoza	1–1	Lleida Esportiu	Zaragoza
				Stadium: La Romareda

10 April 1994 33	Rayo Vallecano	1–2	Real Zaragoza	Vallecas
				Stadium: Campo Vallecas

16 April 1994 34	Real Zaragoza	1–1	Logroñes CF	Zaragoza
				Stadium: La Romareda

24 April 1994 35	Valencia CF	3–0	Real Zaragoza	Valencia
				Stadium: Mestalla

1 May 1994 36	Real Zaragoza	4–1	Celta de Vigo	Zaragoza
				Stadium: La Romareda

8 May 1994 37	Sporting de Gijón	0–3	Real Zaragoza	Gijón
				Stadium: El Molinon

15 May 1994 38	Real Zaragoza	4–1	Real Madrid	Zaragoza
				Stadium: La Romareda

=== Copa del Rey ===
==== Eightfinals ====
6 January 1994	Badajoz	1–0	Real Zaragoza	Badajoz
17:00 CET	Altimira 38'	Report (in Spanish)		Stadium: El Vivero; Attendance: — Referee: Nuñez Manrique (Community of Madrid)

12 January 1994	Real Zaragoza	3–0	Badajoz	Zaragoza
20:45 CET	Aragón 27' (pen.); Pardeza 34', 88'	Report (in Spanish)		Stadium: La Romareda; Attendance: — Referee: Gómez López (Region of Murcia)

==== Quarterfinals ====
26 January 1994	Real Zaragoza	2–1	Sevilla	Zaragoza
20:45 CET	Aragón 18' (pen.); Poyet 64'	Report (in Spanish)	Cortijo 87'	Stadium: La Romareda; Attendance: — Referee: Díaz Vega (Asturias)

2 February 1994	Sevilla	1–1	Real Zaragoza	Seville
21:00 CET	Moya 35'	Report (in Spanish)	Poyet 85'	Stadium: Ramón Sánchez Pizjuán; Attendance: 35,000; Referee: García-Aranda (Community of Madrid)

==== Semifinals ====
17 February 1994	Real Betis	0–1	Real Zaragoza	Seville
21:30 CET		Report (in Spanish)	Aragón 32'	Stadium: Benito Villamarín; Attendance: — Referee: Ansuátegui Roca (Valencian Community)

9 March 1994	Real Zaragoza	3–1 (a.e.t.)	Real Betis	Zaragoza
21:00 CET	Poyet 94'; Gay 97'; Moisés 110' (pen.)	Report (in Spanish)	Ríos 90+1'	Stadium: La Romareda; Attendance: 42,000; Referee: García-Aranda (Community of Madrid)

==== Final ====
20 April 1994	Celta de Vigo	0 – 0 (a.e.t.) (4−5 p)	Real Zaragoza	Madrid
21:30 CET		Report (in Spanish)		Stadium: Vicente Calderón Stadium; Attendance: 60,000; Referee: Antonio Jesús López Nieto
	Penalties
	Andrijašević (penalty scored); Gudelj (penalty scored); Dadíe (penalty scored); Losada (penalty scored); Alejo (penalty missed)		(penalty scored) Cáceres; (penalty scored) Nayim; (penalty scored) Franco; (penalty scored) Gay; (penalty scored) Higuera

== Statistics ==
=== Players statistics ===
No.	Pos	Nat	Player	Total		La Liga		Copa del Rey	
No.	Pos	Nat	Player	Apps	Goals	Apps	Goals	Apps	Goals
	GK	(Spain) ESP	Cedrún	31	-35	23	-29	8	-6
	DF	(Spain) ESP	Belsué	48	3	35	3	13	0
	DF	(Spain) ESP	Aguado	46	2	35	2	11	0
	DF	(Argentina) ARG	Caceres	40	1	30	1	10	0
	DF	(Spain) ESP	Solana	46	2	33	2	13	0
	MF	(Uruguay) URU	Poyet	46	9	32+2	4	12	5
	MF	(Spain) ESP	Garcia Sanjuan	47	3	25+10	1	8+4	2
	MF	(Spain) ESP	Aragon	47	11	33+1	7	13	4
	FW	(Spain) ESP	Higuera	47	14	34+1	12	12	2
	FW	(Argentina) ARG	Esnaider	40	16	29	13	11	3
	FW	(Spain) ESP	Pardeza	36	8	21+5	5	9+1	3
	GK	(Spain) ESP	Juanmi	20	-20	15	-18	5	-2
	MF	(Spain) ESP	Nayim	41	2	19+14	2	3+5	0
	MF	(Spain) ESP	Gay	40	9	20+8	7	10+2	2
	DF	(Spain) ESP	Lizarralde	32	0	14+9	0	3+6	0
	FW	(Spain) ESP	Moises	18	4	6+8	2	0+4	2
	MF	(Argentina) ARG	Franco	12	2	6+5	2	0+1	0
	DF	(Spain) ESP	Esteban	8	0	4+3	0	1	0
	MF	(Spain) ESP	Fuertes	6	0	1+4	0	0+1	0
	DF	(Spain) ESP	Sergi	7	0	3+2	0	1+1	0
	MF	(Spain) ESP	Seba	3	0	0+3	0		
	DF	(Spain) ESP	Narcís Julià						
	GK	(Spain) ESP	Sanchez Broto						
	FW	(Spain) ESP	Peña						
	DF	(Spain) ESP	Cuartero						
	GK	(Spain) ESP	Belman						

- Source: BDFutbol

== See also ==
- BDFutbol
