= 1993 Copa del Rey final =

Copa del Rey 1993 final
- Event: 1992–93 Copa del Rey
Real Madrid	Zaragoza
2	0
- Date: 26 June 1993
- Venue: Estadio de Mestalla, Valencia
- Referee: Joaquín Urío Velázquez
- Attendance: 42,000

The 1993 Copa del Rey final was the 91st final of the King's Cup. The final was played at Estadio de Mestalla in Valencia, on 26 June 1993, being won by Real Madrid, who beat Real Zaragoza 2–0.

== Details ==
26 June 1993
21:00 CET

Real Madrid	2–0	Real Zaragoza
Butragueño 29'; Lasa 78'	Report

Mestalla, Valencia
Attendance: 42,000
Referee: Joaquín Urío Velázquez

Real Madrid
Zaragoza

GK	1	(Spain) Francisco Buyo
RB	2	(Spain) Chendo		(substituted off) 75'
CB	4	(Spain) Nando	(yellow card) 8'
CB	5	(Spain) Manuel Sanchís (c)
LB	3	(Spain) Mikel Lasa	(yellow card) 84'
RM	8	(Spain) Míchel
CM	6	(Spain) Fernando Hierro
CM	10	(Spain) Luis Milla
LM	11	(Spain) Francisco Villarroya
RF	7	(Spain) Emilio Butragueño
LF	9	(Spain) Alfonso		(substituted off) 64'
Substitutes:
DF	12	(Spain) Luis Miguel Ramis		(substituted on) 75'
GK	13	(Spain) Pedro Luis Jaro
MF	14	(Croatia) Robert Prosinečki
MF	15	(Spain) Rafael Martín Vázquez
FW	16	(Argentina) Juan Esnáider		(substituted on) 64'
Manager:
(Spain) Benito Floro

GK	1	(Spain) Andoni Cedrún
DF	2	(Spain) Jesús Solana	(yellow card) 74'
DF	4	(Spain) Narcís Julià (c)		(substituted off) 62'
DF	6	(Spain) Xavier Aguado	(yellow card) 5'
DF	3	(Spain) Esteban
MF	5	(Spain) Alberto Belsué	(yellow card) 44'
MF	10	(Spain) José Aurelio Gay	(yellow card) 88'
MF	8	(Spain) Jesús García Sanjuán
MF	11	(Uruguay) Gustavo Poyet	(yellow card) 32'
FW	7	(Spain) Moisés		(substituted off) 72'
FW	9	(Spain) Francisco Higuera
Substitutes:
MF	12	(Spain) Iñigo Lizarralde		(substituted on) 62'
GK	13	(Spain) Javier Sánchez Broto
FW	14	(Spain) Miguel Pardeza
FW	15	(Spain) Jesús Seba		(substituted on) 72'
FW	16	(Spain) Manuel Peña
Manager:
(Spain) Víctor Fernández

MATCH RULES

- 90 minutes.
- 30 minutes of extra-time if necessary.
- Penalty shoot-out if scores still level.
- Five named substitutes.
- Maximum of two substitutions.
