= 1996–97 Real Zaragoza season =

Real Zaragoza S.A.D.
1996–97 season
- Owner: Solans Family (64%)
- President: Alfonso Solans
- Head coach: Víctor Fernández (until 7 November 1996); Nieves (until 10 November 1996); Víctor Espárrago (until 27 January 1997); Luis Costa
- Stadium: La Romareda
- La Liga: 14th
- Copa del Rey: Third round
- Top goalscorer: League: Fernando Morientes (15 goals); All: Morientes (16 goals)
| Home colours | Away colours |

The 1996–97 season was the 62nd season for Real Zaragoza in its history. The club competed in La Liga and Copa del Rey.

== Summary ==
During summer Alfonso Solans in his fifth season as president, reinforced the squad with several players such as midfielder Kily González and Brazilian centre back Gilmar whom were transferred in from Boca Juniors and Cruzeiro respectively. Also arrived midfielder Vladislav Radimov, Austrian Goalkeeper Otto Konrad, two defenders from Real Madrid left back Miquel Soler and right back Quique Sanchez Flores the latter discarded by Fabio Capello during pre-season. On the contrary striker Sebastian Rambert, midfielder Sergio Berti, centre back Paqui, Goalkeeper Andoni Cedrun (after 12 campaigns), José Aurelio Gay (after 5 years) and Defender Fernando Caceres (after three seasons) all of them left the club. However, in his 6th season as head coach Victor Fernández found a chaotic start of season and after 9 winless matches, left the club after six years on 7 November 1996. President Solans appointed Víctor Espárrago as new manager only to drive the club to relegation zone. Finally, Luis Costa returned after several years to Zaragoza and the squad avoided the Segunda Division on the final league rounds thanks to decent performances delivered by Gus Poyet, Fernando Morientes, Gustavo Adrián López and Kily González

Meanwhile, in Copa del Rey the club was early eliminated in Third round defeated by Racing Santander.

== Squad ==
Note: Flags indicate national team as defined under FIFA eligibility rules; some limited exceptions apply. Players may hold more than one non-FIFA nationality.

| No. | Pos. | Nation | Player |
|---|---|---|---|
| 1 | GK | ESP | Juanmi |
| 2 | DF | ESP | Alberto Belsué |
| 3 | DF | ESP | Jesús Solana |
| 4 | DF | ESP | Luis Cuartero |
| 5 | MF | ESP | Jesús García Sanjuan |
| 6 | DF | ESP | Xavier Aguado |
| 7 | FW | ESP | Miguel Pardeza |
| 8 | MF | ESP | Santiago Aragon |
| 9 | FW | ESP | Fernando Morientes |
| 10 | FW | ESP | Francisco Higuera |
| 11 | MF | URU | Gustavo Poyet |
| 12 | DF | BRA | Gilmar |

| No. | Pos. | Nation | Player |
|---|---|---|---|
| 13 | GK | ESP | José Belman |
| 14 | MF | ESP | Nayim |
| 15 | MF | ESP | Oscar |
| 16 | DF | ESP | Miquel Soler |
| 17 | MF | RUS | Vladislav Radimov |
| 18 | MF | ARG | Kily Gonzalez |
| 19 | FW | ARG | Gustavo Adrián López |
| 20 | FW | ESP | Daniel García Lara |
| 21 | MF | ESP | Ander Garitano |
| 22 | DF | ESP | Quique Sanchez Flores |
| 25 | GK | AUT | Otto Konrad |
| 26 | FW | ESP | Jesús Seba |

=== Transfers ===
In
| Pos. | Name | from | Type |
|---|---|---|---|
| MF | Kily Gonzalez | Boca Juniors | |
| DF | Gilmar | Cruzeiro | |
| MF | Ander Garitano | Athletic Bilbao | |
| DF | Miquel Soler | Real Madrid | |
| DF | Quique Sanchez Flores | Real Madrid | |
| MF | Vladislav Radimov | CSKA Moscow | |

Out
| Pos. | Name | To | Type |
|---|---|---|---|
| DF | Fernando Caceres | Valencia CF | |
| GK | Andoni Cedrun | Logroñes CF | |
| DF | Paqui | Hercules CF | |
| MF | Sergio Berti | CA River Plate | |
| FW | Sebastian Rambert | Boca Juniors | loan ended |
| MF | Jose Aurelio Gay | Real Oviedo | |

==== Winter ====
In
| Pos. | Name | from | Type |
|---|---|---|---|
| FW | Jesús Seba | Wigan Athletic | |
| GK | Otto Konrad | Austria Salzburg | |

Out
| Pos. | Name | To | Type |

== Competitions ==
=== La Liga ===
==== League table ====
| Pos | Team | Pld | W | D | L | GF | GA | GD | Pts |
|---|---|---|---|---|---|---|---|---|---|
| 12 | Espanyol | 42 | 14 | 9 | 19 | 51 | 57 | −6 | 51 |
| 13 | Racing Santander | 42 | 11 | 17 | 14 | 52 | 54 | −2 | 50 (Note: RAC: 9 pts; ZAR: 6 pts; SPG: 3 pts) |
| 14 | Zaragoza | 42 | 12 | 14 | 16 | 58 | 66 | −8 | 50 |
| 15 | Sporting Gijón | 42 | 13 | 11 | 18 | 45 | 63 | −18 | 50 |
| 16 | Celta Vigo | 42 | 12 | 13 | 17 | 51 | 54 | −3 | 49 |

Source: LFP
Rules for classification: 1) points; 2) head-to-head points; 3) head-to-head goal difference; 4) head-to-head goals scored; 5) goal difference; 6) number of goals scored.

==== Position by round ====
| Round | 1 | 2 | 3 | 4 | 5 | 6 | 7 | 8 | 9 | 10 | 11 | 12 | 13 | 14 | 15 | 16 | 17 | 18 | 19 | 20 | 21 | 22 | 23 | 24 | 25 | 26 | 27 | 28 | 29 | 30 | 31 | 32 | 33 | 34 | 35 | 36 | 37 | 38 | 39 | 40 | 41 | 42 |
|---|---|---|---|---|---|---|---|---|---|---|---|---|---|---|---|---|---|---|---|---|---|---|---|---|---|---|---|---|---|---|---|---|---|---|---|---|---|---|---|---|---|---|
| Ground | H | A | H | A | H | A | H | A | H | A | H | A | H | A | H | A | H | A | A | H | A | A | H | A | H | A | H | A | H | A | H | A | H | A | H | A | H | A | A | H | A | H |
| Result | D | W | D | L | L | D | D | L | L | D | L | D | D | D | W | L | L | L | L | D | L | W | W | D | W | L | W | D | W | L | D | L | W | D | W | L | W | W | W | L | D | L |
| Position | 10 | 7 | 9 | 13 | 18 | 19 | 18 | 18 | 19 | 19 | 20 | 20 | 20 | 20 | 18 | 19 | 19 | 19 | 21 | 21 | 22 | 20 | 18 | 18 | 18 | 18 | 17 | 17 | 14 | 16 | 16 | 18 | 16 | 18 | 14 | 16 | 14 | 12 | 11 | 13 | 12 | 14 |

Source: https://www.bdfutbol.com/en/t/t1997-9839.html?tab=partits
A = Away; H = Home; W = Win; D = Draw; L = Loss; = Leader, 1997–98 UEFA Champions League Group stage; = 1997–98 UEFA Champions League Second Qualifying round; = 1997–98 UEFA Cup First round; = 1997–98 Relegation playoff to 1997–98 Segunda Division; = 1997–98 Segunda Division; R = 1997–98 UEFA Cup Winners' Cup

==== Matches ====
| 1 September 1996 1 | Real Zaragoza | 2–2 | Logroñes CF | Zaragoza |
| | Gus Poyet 20'; Gus Poyet 49' | | 56' Manel; 85' Manel | Stadium: La Romareda; Attendance: 18,000 |

| 8 September 1996 2 | Sevilla CF | 1–2 | Real Zaragoza | Seville |
| | Mornar 90' | | 44' G. Lopez; 47' Morientes | Stadium: Sanchez Pizjuan; Attendance: 46,900 |

| 14 September 1996 3 | Real Zaragoza | 1–1 | Valencia CF | Zaragoza |
| | Aguado 9' | | 44' Moya | Stadium: La Romareda; Attendance: 18,000 |

| 22 September 1996 4 | Sporting Gijón | 2–0 | Real Zaragoza | Gijón |
| | Nikiforov 19'; Salinas 29' | | | Stadium: El Molinón; Attendance: 19350 |

| 29 September 1996 5 | Real Zaragoza | 3–5 | FC Barcelona | Zaragoza |
| | Gus Poyet 10'; G. Lopez 36'; G. Lopez 46' | | 21' Figo; 53' Ronaldo; 85' Ronaldo; 72' (pen.) Popescu; 81' Luis Enrique | Stadium: La Romareda; Attendance: 34,000 |

| 2 October 1996 6 | Real Valladolid | 1–1 | Real Zaragoza | Valladolid |
| | Peternac 10' | | 67' Gus Poyet | Stadium: Estadio Jose Zorrilla; Attendance: 16,000 |

| 12 October 1996 7 | Real Zaragoza | 1–1 | Athletic Bilbao | Zaragoza |
| | Higuera 46' | | 16' Ziganda | Stadium: La Romareda; Attendance: 30000 |

| 19 October 1996 8 | Extremadura CF | 2–1 | Real Zaragoza | Almendralejo |
| | Gluscevic 10'; Gluscevic 65' | | 90' G. Lopez | Stadium: Estadio Francisco de la Hera; Attendance: 8500 |

| 22 October 1996 9 | Real Zaragoza | 1–2 | Real Madrid | Zaragoza |
| | Gus Poyet 50' | | 16'Suker; 80' (pen.) Suker | Stadium: La Romareda; Attendance: 30000 |

| 27 October 1996 10 | Celta Vigo | 0–0 | Real Zaragoza | Vigo |
| | | | | Stadium: Balaidos; Attendance: 13000 |

| 3 November 1996 11 | Real Zaragoza | 1–2 | Deportivo La Coruña | Zaragoza |
| | Gus Poyet 29' | | 24' Beguiristain; 66' Martin Vazquez | Stadium: La Romareda; Attendance: 27000 |

| 10 November 1996 12 | Hercules CF | 1–1 | Real Zaragoza | Alicante |
| | Jankovic 66' | | 74' Dani | Stadium: Estadio José Rico Perez; Attendance: 17,000 |

| 17 November 1996 13 | Real Zaragoza | 2–2 | Real Betis | Zaragoza |
| | Dani 33'; Dani 81' | | 48' Alexis; 86' (pen.) Alexis | Stadium: La Romareda; Attendance: 20,000 |

| 24 November 1996 14 | Rayo Vallecano | 1–1 | Real Zaragoza | Madrid |
| | Andrijasevic 34' | | 54' Morientes | Stadium: Vallecas |

| 1 December 1996 15 | Real Zaragoza | 1–0 | Real Oviedo | Zaragoza |
| | Gus Poyet 34' | | | Stadium: La Romareda; Attendance: 22000 |

| 8 December 1996 16 | RCD Espanyol | 3–0 | Real Zaragoza | Barcelona |
| | Francisco 31'; Pochettino 45'; Ouedec 79' | | | Stadium: Sarrià; Attendance: 12000 |

| 22 December 1996 17 | Real Zaragoza | 0–2 | Racing Santander | Zaragoza |
| | | | 9' Schurrer; 76' Bestchastnykh | Stadium: La Romareda; Attendance: 18000 |

| 5 January 1997 18 | Real Sociedad | 1–0 | Real Zaragoza | San Sebastián |
| | Gracia 90' | | | Stadium: Anoeta Stadium; Attendance: 18000 |

| 12 January 1997 19 | Atletico Madrid | 5–1 | Real Zaragoza | Madrid |
| | Caminero 1'; Paunovic 38'; Kiko 45'; Kiko 54'; Esnaider 67' (pen.) | | 53' Higuera | Stadium: Vicente Calderón; Attendance: 35000 |

| 19 January 1997 20 | Real Zaragoza | 1–1 | CD Tenerife | Zaragoza |
| | Morientes 90' | | 69' Vivar Dorado | Stadium: La Romareda; Attendance: 30000 |

| 26 January 1997 21 | SD Compostela | 2–1 | Real Zaragoza | Santiago de Compostela |
| | Ohen 56'; Fabiano 76' | | 90' Morientes | Stadium: San Lázaro; Attendance: 12000 |

| 2 February 1997 22 | Logroñes CF | 1–2 | Real Zaragoza | Logroño |
| | Ruben Sosa 87' | | 51' Aragon; 90' Gus Poyet | Stadium: Las Gaunas; Attendance: 15000 |

| 9 February 1997 23 | Real Zaragoza | 2–1 | Sevilla CF | Zaragoza |
| | Higuera 25'; Kily González 76' | | 56' Ramis | Stadium: La Romareda |

| 15 February 1997 24 | Valencia CF | 1–1 | Real Zaragoza | Valencia |
| | Claudio Lopez 13' | | 81' Kily González | Stadium: Mestalla; Attendance: 45000 |

| 19 February 1997 25 | Real Zaragoza | 5–0 | Sporting Gijon | Zaragoza |
| | Aragon 33'; Morientes 40'; Morientes 43'; Morientes 49'; Radimov 81' | | | Stadium: La Romareda; Attendance: 35000 |

| 23 February 1997 26 | FC Barcelona | 4–1 | Real Zaragoza | Barcelona |
| | Abelardo 10'; Ronaldo 40' (pen.); Ronaldo 45'; Ronaldo 72' | | 81' (pen.) Garitano | Stadium: Camp Nou; Attendance: 90,000 |

| 2 March 1997 27 | Real Zaragoza | 1–0 | Real Valladolid | Zaragoza |
| | Morientes 64' | | | Stadium: La Romareda; Attendance: 35000 |

| 9 March 1997 27 | Athletic Bilbao | 2–2 | Real Zaragoza | Bilbao |
| | Etxeberria 21'; Karanka 32' | | 17' Poyet; 90' Poyet | Stadium: San Mamés; Attendance: 37000 |

| 16 March 1997 28 | Real Zaragoza | 3–1 | Extremadura CF | Zaragoza |
| | Dani García 1'; Morientes 52'; Morientes 79' | | 18' Silvani | Stadium: La Romareda; Attendance: 35000 |

| 23 March 1997 29 | Real Madrid | 2–0 | Real Zaragoza | Madrid |
| | Hierro 35'; Hierro 43' | | | Stadium: Santiago Bernabeu; Attendance: 90000 |

| 30 March 1997 30 | Real Zaragoza | 1–1 | Celta de Vigo | Zaragoza |
| | Morientes 10' | | 3' Moises | Stadium: La Romareda; Attendance: 28000 |

| 6 April 1997 31 | Deportivo La Coruña | 1–0 | Real Zaragoza | A Coruña |
| | Rivaldo 33' | | | Stadium: Riazor; Attendance: 22000 |

| 13 April 1997 33 | Real Zaragoza | 2–0 | Hercules CF | Zaragoza |
| | Kily González 22'; Radimov 82' | | | Stadium: La Romareda; Attendance: 35,000 |

| 16 April 1997 34 | Real Betis | 2–2 | Real Zaragoza | Seville |
| | Alfonso 4'; Alfonso 28' (pen.) | | 31' Nayim; 83' (pen.) Aragon | Stadium: Benito Villamarín |

| 20 April 1997 34 | Real Zaragoza | 3–2 | Rayo Vallecano | Zaragoza |
| | Gus Poyet 42'; Morientes 52'; Morientes 82' | | 3' Guilherme; 19' Guilherme | Stadium: La Romareda; Attendance: 25000 |

| 4 May 1997 35 | Real Oviedo | 1–0 | Real Zaragoza | Oviedo |
| | Oli 74' | | | Stadium: Carlos Tartiere; Attendance: 19000 |

| 11 May 1997 36 | Real Zaragoza | 1–0 | RCD Espanyol | Zaragoza |
| | Gus Poyet 76' | | | Stadium: La Romareda; Attendance: 32000 |

| 18 May 1997 37 | Racing Santander | 1–2 | Real Zaragoza | Santander |
| | Merino 64' | | 33' Garitano; 84' Gus Poyet | Stadium: El Sardinero; Attendance: 14000 |

| 25 May 1997 39 | Real Zaragoza | 3–0 | Real Sociedad | Zaragoza |
| | Garitano 52' (pen.); Gustavo Lopez 62'; Morientes 66' | | | Stadium: La Romareda; Attendance: 32000 |

| 2 June 1997 40 | Real Zaragoza | 2–3 | Atletico Madrid | Zaragoza |
| | Morientes 50'; Higuera 72' | | 20' Esnaider; 28' Pantic; 65' Caminero | Stadium: La Romareda; Attendance: 25000 |

| 15 June 1997 41 | CD Tenerife | 3–3 | Real Zaragoza | Santa Cruz de Tenerife |
| | Chano 14'; Neuville 57'; Neuville 81' | | 16' Dani García; 30' Gus Poyet; 90' Higuera | Stadium: Heliodoro Rodriguez; Attendance: 10000 |

| 22 June 1997 42 | Real Zaragoza | 1–3 | SD Compostela | Zaragoza |
| | Higuera 39' | | 56' Penev; 87' Penev; 79' Manuel | Stadium: La Romareda; Attendance: 28000 |

=== Copa del Rey ===
==== Second round ====
| 6 November 1996 | Real Unión | 1-6 | Real Zaragoza | Irun |
| | | | | Stadium: Gal |

| 27 November 1996 | Real Zaragoza | 2-1 | Real Unión | Zaragoza |
| | | | | Stadium: La Romareda |

==== Third round ====
| 8 January 1997 | Real Zaragoza | 1-1 | Racing Santander | Zaragoza |
| | | | | Stadium: La Romareda |

| 15 January 1997 | Racing Santander | 1-0 (2-1 agg.) | Real Zaragoza | Santander |
| | | | | Stadium: El Sardinero |

== Statistics ==
=== Players statistics ===
| No. | Pos | Nat | Player | Total | | La Liga | | Copa del Rey | |
| No. | Pos | Nat | Player | Apps | Goals | Apps | Goals | Apps | Goals |
|---|---|---|---|---|---|---|---|---|---|
| 1 | GK | (Spain) ESP | Juanmi | 28 | -40 | 23+4 | -40 | 1 | 0 |
| 2 | DF | (Spain) ESP | Belsue | 37 | 0 | 36 | 0 | 1 | 0 |
| 12 | DF | (Brazil) BRA | Gilmar | 23 | 0 | 22 | 0 | 1 | 0 |
| 6 | DF | (Spain) ESP | Aguado | 41 | 2 | 37 | 1 | 4 | 1 |
| 3 | DF | (Spain) ESP | Solana | 42 | 0 | 39 | 0 | 3 | 0 |
| 11 | MF | (Uruguay) URU | Poyet | 39 | 14 | 37+1 | 14 | 1 | 0 |
| 21 | MF | (Spain) ESP | Garitano | 40 | 3 | 32+5 | 3 | 1+2 | 0 |
| 8 | MF | (Spain) ESP | Aragon | 38 | 3 | 35+1 | 3 | 1+1 | 0 |
| 18 | MF | (Argentina) ARG | Kily Gonzalez | 34 | 4 | 27+3 | 3 | 3+1 | 1 |
| 9 | FW | (Spain) ESP | Morientes | 40 | 16 | 26+11 | 15 | 2+1 | 1 |
| 19 | FW | (Argentina) ARG | Lopez | 35 | 4 | 31+2 | 4 | 1+1 | 0 |
| 25 | GK | (Austria) AUT | Konrad | 19 | -26 | 18 | -25 | 1 | -1 |
| 20 | FW | (Spain) ESP | Dani Garcia | 36 | 6 | 21+12 | 5 | 3 | 1 |
| 10 | FW | (Spain) ESP | Higuera | 37 | 7 | 18+16 | 6 | 1+2 | 1 |
| 4 | DF | (Spain) ESP | Cuartero | 20 | 0 | 13+5 | 0 | 2 | 0 |
| 17 | MF | (Russia) RUS | Radimov | 27 | 2 | 12+13 | 2 | 2 | 0 |
| 16 | DF | (Spain) ESP | Soler | 17 | 0 | 10+5 | 0 | 2 | 0 |
| 22 | DF | (Spain) ESP | Sanchez Flores | 10 | 0 | 8+1 | 0 | 1 | 0 |
| 15 | MF | (Spain) ESP | Oscar | 12 | 0 | 6+3 | 0 | 2+1 | 0 |
| 14 | MF | (Spain) ESP | Nayim | 24 | 2 | 5+16 | 1 | 3 | 1 |
| 5 | MF | (Spain) ESP | Garcia Sanjuan | 15 | 0 | 4+8 | 0 | 2+1 | 0 |
| 7 | FW | (Spain) ESP | Pardeza | 11 | 1 | 1+7 | 0 | 3 | 1 |
| 13 | GK | (Spain) ESP | Belman | 3 | -5 | 1 | -3 | 2 | -2 |
| 26 | FW | (Spain) ESP | Seba | 1 | 0 | 0+1 | 0 | | |
| | DF | (Spain) ESP | Bosca | 1 | 0 | 0 | 0 | 1 | 0 |

- Source: BDFutbol

== See also ==
- BDFutbol
