= Cedrún =

Cedrún is a surname. Notable people with the surname include:

- Andoni Cedrún (born 1960), Spanish football goalkeeper
- Carmelo Cedrún (1930–2026), Spanish football goalkeeper and manager
- Markel Areitio Cedrún (born 1996), Spanish football goalkeeper
