= 2011 Copa del Rey final =

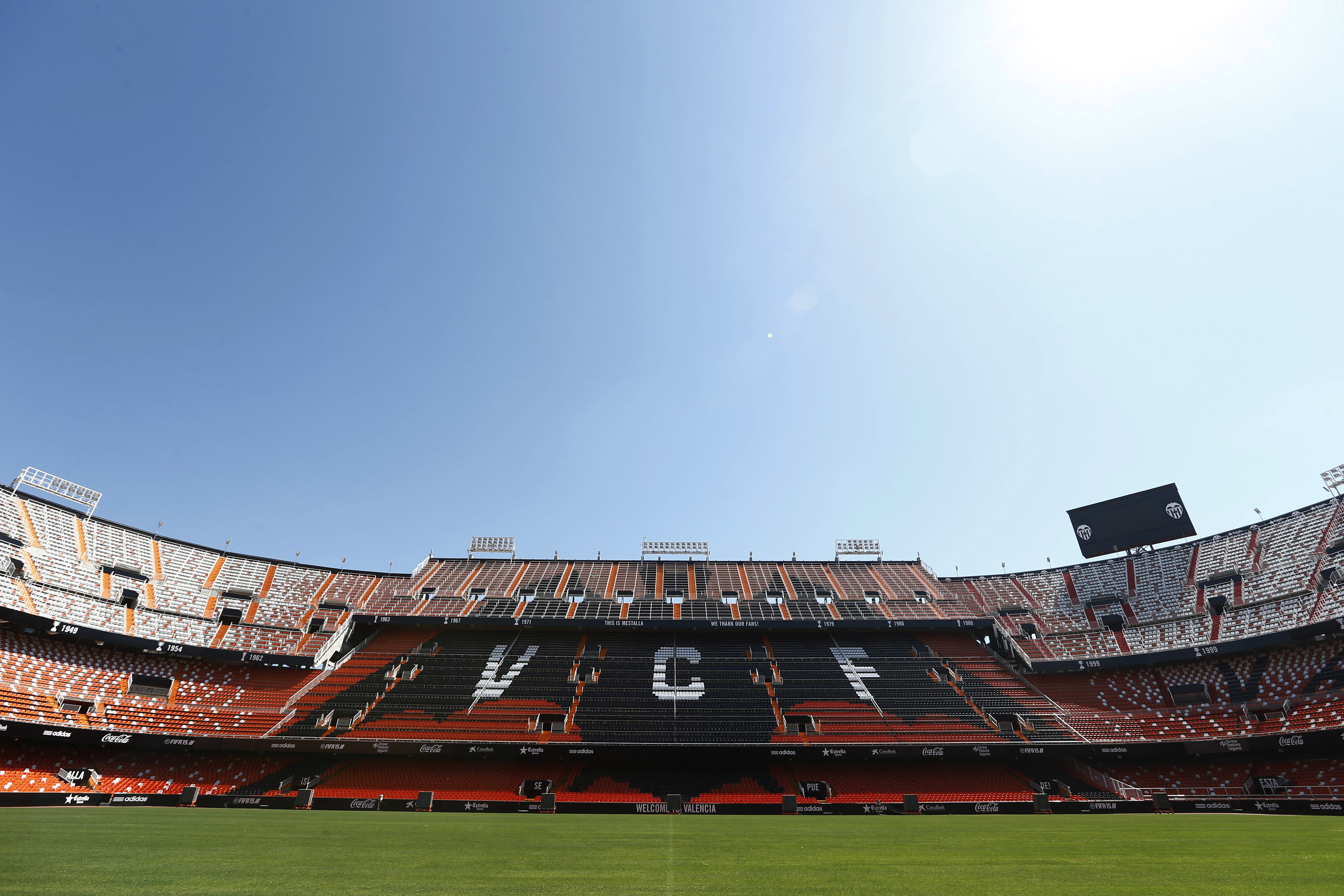
- Mestalla Stadium in Valencia hosted the final
- Event: 2010–11 Copa del Rey
Real Madrid	Barcelona
1	0
- After extra time
- Date: 20 April 2011
- Venue: Mestalla, Valencia
- Referee: Alberto Undiano Mallenco
- Attendance: 55,000
- Weather: Mostly cloudy 16 °C (61 °F)

The 2011 Copa del Rey final was the 109th final since the tournament's establishment (including two seasons where two rival editions were played). The match was a traditional 'El Clásico' rivalry between Barcelona and Real Madrid which took place on 20 April 2011 at the Mestalla Stadium in Valencia, making it the sixth such Copa del Rey final (the most recent in April 1990 at the same venue), just four days after the two teams played each other in La Liga and seven days before they met in the UEFA Champions League semi-final first leg.

Real Madrid lifted the trophy for the 18th time in their history with a 1–0 victory after extra time. It was Real Madrid's first win in 18 years, having last won the Copa del Rey in 1993 against Real Zaragoza.

== Road to the final ==
Barcelona			Round	Real Madrid
Opponent	Result	Legs		Opponent	Result	Legs
Ceuta	7–1	2–0 away; 5–1 home	Round of 32	Murcia	5–1	0–0 away; 5–1 home
Athletic Bilbao	1–1 (a)	0–0 home; 1–1 away	Round of 16	Levante	8–2	8–0 home; 0–2 away
Real Betis	6–3	5–0 home; 1–3 away	Quarter-finals	Atlético Madrid	4–1	3–1 home; 1–0 away
Almería	8–0	5–0 home; 3–0 away	Semi-finals	Sevilla	3–0	1–0 away; 2–0 home

== Match ==
The match was scoreless after 90 minutes but there had been numerous scoring chances on both sides. Cristiano Ronaldo was credited with having three good chances in the first half, the last of which was kept out with a one-handed save by Barcelona goalkeeper José Manuel Pinto. Barcelona did not have a shot on target in the first half, but in the second they dominated possession, with Andrés Iniesta and Pedro both forcing saves from Real Madrid goalkeeper Iker Casillas. The game was won in the first period of extra time by the game's only goal, a header from Cristiano Ronaldo from a cross from Ángel Di María.

The BBC gave credit to Real Madrid manager José Mourinho's defensive tactics for keeping Barcelona scoreless. When Barcelona's Xavi, Andrés Iniesta, Lionel Messi and David Villa got the ball, they were challenged by two Madrid players. There were many fouls in the match, with the referee issuing eight yellow cards. Real Madrid's Ángel Di María was sent off in the 120th minute after receiving his second booking.

=== Match details ===
20 April 2011
21:30 CEST

Barcelona	0–1 (a.e.t.)	Real Madrid
	Report (in Spanish)	Ronaldo 103'

Mestalla, Valencia
Attendance: 55,000
Referee: Alberto Undiano Mallenco (Navarre)

Barcelona	Real Madrid

GK	13	(Spain) José Manuel Pinto
RB	2	(Brazil) Dani Alves		(substituted off) 115'
CB	14	(Argentina) Javier Mascherano
CB	3	(Spain) Gerard Piqué
LB	21	(Brazil) Adriano	(yellow card) 117'
DM	16	(Spain) Sergio Busquets		(substituted off) 107'
CM	6	(Spain) Xavi (c)
CM	8	(Spain) Andrés Iniesta
RW	17	(Spain) Pedro	(yellow card) 34'
LW	7	(Spain) David Villa		(substituted off) 104'
CF	10	(Argentina) Lionel Messi	(yellow card) 65'
Substitutes:
GK	1	(Spain) Víctor Valdés
DF	5	(Spain) Carles Puyol
DF	18	(Argentina) Gabriel Milito
DF	19	(Brazil) Maxwell		(substituted on) 115'
MF	15	(Mali) Seydou Keita		(substituted on) 107'
MF	20	(Netherlands) Ibrahim Afellay		(substituted on) 104'
MF	30	(Spain) Thiago
Manager:
(Spain) Pep Guardiola

GK	1	(Spain) Iker Casillas (c)
RB	17	(Spain) Álvaro Arbeloa
CB	4	(Spain) Sergio Ramos
CB	2	(Portugal) Ricardo Carvalho		(substituted off) 119'
LB	12	(Brazil) Marcelo
DM	3	(Portugal) Pepe	(yellow card) 26'
CM	14	(Spain) Xabi Alonso	(yellow card) 60'
CM	24	(Germany) Sami Khedira		(substituted off) 104'
RW	23	(Germany) Mesut Özil		(substituted off) 69'
LW	22	(Argentina) Ángel Di María	(yellow card) 85' (yellow-red card) 120'
CF	7	(Portugal) Cristiano Ronaldo
Substitutes:
GK	25	(Poland) Jerzy Dudek
DF	19	(Argentina) Ezequiel Garay		(substituted on) 119'
MF	8	(Brazil) Kaká
MF	11	(Spain) Esteban Granero		(substituted on) 104'
FW	6	(Togo) Emmanuel Adebayor	(yellow card) 73'	(substituted on) 69'
FW	9	(France) Karim Benzema
FW	20	(Argentina) Gonzalo Higuaín
Manager:
(Portugal) José Mourinho

Assistant referees:
Fermín Martínez Ibáñez (Navarre)
Jesús Calvo Guadamuro (Andalusia)
Fourth official:
Fernando Teixeira Vitienes (Cantabria)

Match rules:

- 90 minutes
- 30 minutes of extra time if necessary
- Penalty shoot-out if scores still level
- Seven named substitutes
- Maximum of three substitutions

== Aftermath ==
Real Madrid players celebrated their victory that evening by riding a double-decker bus through Madrid where they were greeted by cheering crowds. While holding the trophy aloft, Real Madrid defender Sergio Ramos dropped the cup in front of the bus, where it was crushed. Ramos later joked that he had not dropped the cup, but that the cup jumped down to meet the fans. The cup was replaced immediately with a spare version and placed in the Real Madrid museum.

== See also ==
- El Clásico
