= 2002–03 Celtic F.C. season =

Celtic
2002–03 season
- Chairman: Brian Quinn
- Manager: Martin O'Neill
- Stadium: Celtic Park
- Scottish Premier League: 2nd
- Scottish Cup: Quarter-finals
- Scottish League Cup: Runners-up
- UEFA Champions League: Third qualifying round
- UEFA Cup: Runners-up
- Top goalscorer: League: Henrik Larsson (28); All: Henrik Larsson (44)
| Home colours | Away colours |

Celtic went into the 2002–03 season defending their Scottish Premier League title, which they won in 2001–02.

They also entered the UEFA Champions League at the qualifying stage, as well as taking part in the two domestic cup competitions, the Scottish Cup and the Scottish League Cup.

== Season overview ==
=== League campaign ===
Celtic lost out on the title on the last day of the season despite a 4–0 win at Kilmarnock, with a goal difference of 1 less than Rangers over the whole season.

=== European campaign ===
Celtic went into third qualifying stage of the Champions League but failed to beat Basel. They then dropped down into the UEFA Cup where they beat teams including Blackburn Rovers, Stuttgart and Liverpool to reach the final where they lost 2–3 after extra time to Porto.

=== Domestic cups ===
Celtic reached the final of the Scottish League Cup, but a late penalty miss by John Hartson meant the trophy went to Rangers. As the number of games to be played took its toll, an inexperienced Celtic side lost to Inverness CT in the Scottish Cup.

== Competitions ==
| Date | Venue | Opponents | Score | Competition | Celtic scorers | Match Report |
|---|---|---|---|---|---|---|
| 6 July 2002 | Tolka Park | Shelbourne | 4 – 1 | Friendly | Sutton, Agathe, Hartson (2) | |
| 7 July 2002 | Tolka Park | Shamrock Rovers | 1 – 1 | Friendly | Balde | |
| 10 July 2002 | Fratton Park | Portsmouth | 3 – 2 | Friendly | Sylla, Petta, Healy | |
| 13 July 2002 | Loftus Road | QPR | 7 – 3 | Friendly | Healy, Sutton, Hartson, Maloney, Sylla, Fernández (2) | |
| 17 July 2002 | | SF Liebnitz | 3 – 1 | Friendly | Maloney, Fernández (2) | |
| 19 July 2002 | | Werder Bremen | 2 – 6 | Friendly | Hartson, Fernández | |
| 24 July 2002 | Celtic Park | Ajax | 1 – 3 | Friendly | Sutton | |
| 27 July 2002 | Celtic Park | Parma | 2 – 1 | Friendly | Sutton, Sylla | |
| 3 August 2002 | Celtic Park | Dunfermline | 2 – 1 | SPL | Larsson (2) | BBC Sport |
| 7 August 2002 | White Hart Lane | Tottenham Hotspur | 1 – 1 | Friendly | Maloney | BBC Sport |
| 10 August 2002 | Pittodrie | Aberdeen | 4 – 0 | SPL | Mjällby, Sutton, Sylla, Lambert | BBC Sport |
| 14 August 2002 | Celtic Park | Basel | 3 – 1 | CLQ | Larsson (pen.), Sutton, Sylla | BBC Sport |
| 17 August 2002 | Celtic Park | Dundee United | 5 – 0 | SPL | McNamara, Sutton, Petrov, Hartson, Larsson | BBC Sport |
| 24 August 2002 | Firhill | Partick Thistle | 1 – 0 | SPL | Larsson | BBC Sport |
| 28 August 2002 | St. Jakob-Park | Basel | 0 – 2 | CLQ | | BBC Sport |
| 1 September 2002 | Celtic Park | Livingston | 2 – 0 | SPL | Larsson, Balde | BBC Sport |
| 11 September 2002 | Fir Park | Motherwell | 1 – 2 | SPL | Hartson | BBC Sport |
| 14 September 2002 | Celtic Park | Hibernian | 1 – 0 | SPL | Hartson | BBC Sport |
| 19 September 2002 | Celtic Park | FK Sūduva | 8 – 1 | UC | Larsson (3), Petrov, Sutton, Lambert, Hartson, Valgaeren | BBC Sport |
| 22 September 2002 | Dens Park | Dundee | 1 – 0 | SPL | Larsson | BBC Sport |
| 28 September 2002 | Celtic Park | Kilmarnock | 5 – 0 | SPL | Larsson (3), Sutton (2) | BBC Sport |
| 3 October 2002 | Sūduva stadium | FK Sūduva | 2 – 0 | UC | Fernández, Thompson | BBC Sport |
| 6 October 2002 | Celtic Park | Rangers | 3 – 3 | SPL | Sutton, Larsson (2) | BBC Sport |
| 8 October 2002 | Adams Park | Wycombe Wanderers | 4 – 0 | F | Larsson (2), Cousins (og), Sylla | |
| 20 October 2002 | Tynecastle | Heart of Midlothian | 4 – 1 | SPL | Sutton, Petrov, Larsson (2) | BBC Sport |
| 23 October 2002 | Celtic Park | Inverness CT | 4 – 2 | SLC | Maloney, Thompson, Hartson (2) | BBC Sport |
| 27 October 2002 | East End Park | Dunfermline | 4 – 1 | SPL | Larsson, Thompson, Petrov, Sutton | BBC Sport |
| 31 October 2002 | Celtic Park | Blackburn Rovers | 1 – 0 | UC | Larsson | BBC Sport |
| 3 November 2002 | Celtic Park | Aberdeen | 7 – 0 | SPL | Hartson (4), Larsson, Balde, Maloney | BBC Sport |
| 6 November 2002 | Celtic Park | Partick Thistle | 1 – 1 (5-4 after extra-time and penalties) | SLC | Thompson | BBC Sport |
| 10 November 2002 | Tannadice | Dundee United | 2 – 0 | SPL | Hartson, Sutton | BBC Sport |
| 14 November 2002 | Ewood Park | Blackburn Rovers | 2 – 0 | UC | Larsson, Sutton | BBC Sport |
| 17 November 2002 | Celtic Park | Partick Thistle | 4 – 0 | SPL | Sutton, Larsson, Petrov (2) | BBC Sport |
| 24 November 2002 | Almondvale Stadium | Livingston | 2 – 0 | SPL | Larsson (2) | BBC Sport |
| 28 November 2002 | Celtic Park | Celta Vigo | 1 – 0 | UC | Larsson | BBC Sport |
| 1 December 2002 | Celtic Park | Motherwell | 3 – 1 | SPL | Larsson, Leitch (OG), Valgaeren | BBC Sport |
| 4 December 2002 | Easter Road | Hibernian | 1 – 0 | SPL | Petrov | BBC Sport |
| 7 December 2002 | Ibrox | Rangers | 2 – 3 | SPL | Sutton, Hartson | BBC Sport |
| 12 December 2002 | Estadio Balaídos | Celta Vigo | 1 – 2 | UC | Hartson | BBC Sport |
| 15 December 2002 | Rugby Park | Kilmarnock | 1 – 1 | SPL | Valgaeren | BBC Sport |
| 21 December 2002 | Celtic Park | Dundee | 2 – 0 | SPL | Hartson, Larsson | BBC Sport |
| 26 December 2002 | Celtic Park | Heart of Midlothian | 4 – 2 | SPL | Hartson (3), Larsson | BBC Sport |
| 29 December 2002 | Celtic Park | Dunfermline | 1 – 0 | SPL | Larsson | BBC Sport |
| 2 January 2003 | Pittodrie | Aberdeen | 1 – 1 | SPL | Larsson | BBC Sport |
| 22 January 2003 | Celtic Park | Feyenoord | 2 – 3 | Friendly | Hartson, Sylla | |
| 25 January 2003 | Celtic Park | St Mirren | 3 – 0 | SC | Larsson, Sylla | BBC Sport |
| 29 January 2003 | Celtic Park | Dundee United | 2 – 0 | SPL | Hartson, Larsson | BBC Sport |
| 2 February 2003 | Firhill Stadium | Partick Thistle | 2 – 0 | SPL | Sutton (2) | BBC Sport |
| 6 February 2003 | Hampden | Dundee United | 3 – 0 | SLC | Balde (2), Larsson | BBC Sport |
| 9 February 2003 | Celtic Park | Livingston | 2 – 1 | SPL | Sylla, Sutton | BBC Sport |
| 20 February 2003 | Celtic Park | Stuttgart | 3 – 1 | UC | Lambert, Maloney, Petrov | BBC Sport |
| 23 February 2003 | Celtic Park | St Johnstone | 3 – 0 | SC | Hartson (2), Smith | BBC Sport |
| 27 February 2003 | Gottlieb-Daimler-Stadion | Stuttgart | 2 – 3 | UC | Thompson, Sutton | BBC Sport |
| 2 March 2003 | Celtic Park | Hibernian | 3 – 2 | SPL | Hartson (2), Mjällby | BBC Sport |
| 8 March 2003 | Celtic Park | Rangers | 1 – 0 | SPL | Hartson | BBC Sport |
| 13 March 2003 | Celtic Park | Liverpool | 1 – 1 | UC | Larsson | BBC Sport |
| 16 March 2003 | Hampden | Rangers | 1 – 2 | SLC | Larsson | BBC Sport |
| 20 March 2003 | Anfield | Liverpool | 2 – 0 | UC | Thompson, Hartson | BBC Sport |
| 23 March 2003 | Caledonian Stadium | Inverness CT | 0 – 1 | SC | | BBC Sport |
| 6 April 2003 | Dens Park | Dundee | 1 – 1 | SPL | Thompson | BBC Sport |
| 10 April 2003 | Celtic Park | Boavista | 1 – 1 | UC | Larsson | BBC Sport |
| 13 April 2003 | Celtic Park | Kilmarnock | 2 – 0 | SPL | Larsson, Petrov | BBC Sport |
| 19 April 2003 | Tynecastle | Heart of Midlothian | 1 – 2 | SPL | Thompson | BBC Sport |
| 24 April 2003 | Estádio do Bessa | Boavista | 1 – 0 | UC | Larsson | BBC Sport |
| 27 April 2003 | Ibrox | Rangers | 2 – 1 | SPL | Thompson (pen.), Hartson | BBC Sport |
| 3 May 2003 | East End Park | Dunfermline Athletic | 4 – 1 | SPL | Larsson, Petrov (2), Thompson (pen.) | BBC Sport |
| 7 May 2003 | Fir Park | Motherwell | 4 – 0 | SPL | Petrov (2), Lambert (2) | BBC Sport |
| 10 May 2003 | Celtic Park | Heart of Midlothian | 1 – 0 | SPL | Thompson (pen.) | BBC Sport |
| 14 May 2003 | Celtic Park | Dundee | 6 – 2 | SPL | Larsson, Thompson (2), Maloney (2), Mjällby | BBC Sport |
| 21 May 2003 | Estadio Olímpico de Sevilla | Porto | 2 – 3 | UC | Larsson (2) | BBC Sport |
| 25 May 2003 | Rugby Park | Kilmarnock | 4 – 0 | SPL | Sutton (2), Thompson (pen.), Petrov | BBC Sport |

== Player statistics ==
=== Appearances and goals ===
List of squad players, including number of appearances by competition

| No. | Pos | Nat | Player | Total | | Premier League | | Scottish Cup | | League Cup | | Europe | |
| No. | Pos | Nat | Player | Apps | Goals | Apps | Goals | Apps | Goals | Apps | Goals | Apps | Goals |
|---|---|---|---|---|---|---|---|---|---|---|---|---|---|
| 1 | GK | (Scotland) SCO | Jonathan Gould | 3 | 0 | 2 | 0 | 0 | 0 | 0 | 0 | 1 | 0 |
| 2 | DF | (Scotland) SCO | Tom Boyd | 2 | 0 | 0 | 0 | 0 | 0 | 2 | 0 | 0 | 0 |
| 3 | DF | (Guinea) GUI | Mohammed Sylla | 31 | 4 | 13+5 | 2 | 2 | 1 | 0+3 | 0 | 4+4 | 1 |
| 4 | DF | (Scotland) SCO | Jackie McNamara | 28 | 1 | 12+7 | 1 | 2 | 0 | 0 | 0 | 2+5 | 0 |
| 5 | DF | (Belgium) BEL | Joos Valgaeren | 53 | 3 | 35 | 2 | 2 | 0 | 2 | 0 | 14 | 1 |
| 6 | DF | (Guinea) GUI | Dianbobo Balde | 53 | 4 | 36 | 2 | 0 | 0 | 3 | 2 | 14 | 0 |
| 7 | FW | (Sweden) SWE | Henrik Larsson | 51 | 44 | 35 | 28 | 2 | 2 | 2 | 2 | 12 | 12 |
| 8 | MF | (England) ENG | Alan Thompson | 45 | 12 | 26+3 | 8 | 1 | 0 | 2+1 | 1 | 10+2 | 3 |
| 9 | FW | (England) ENG | Chris Sutton | 43 | 19 | 28 | 15 | 1 | 0 | 2 | 0 | 11+1 | 4 |
| 10 | FW | (Wales) WAL | John Hartson | 45 | 25 | 18+9 | 18 | 1+1 | 2 | 4 | 2 | 9+3 | 3 |
| 12 | FW | (Spain) ESP | David Fernández | 19 | 1 | 3+7 | 0 | 2+1 | 0 | 2+1 | 0 | 1+2 | 1 |
| 14 | MF | (Scotland) SCO | Paul Lambert | 48 | 6 | 27+4 | 3 | 1 | 0 | 3 | 1 | 10+3 | 2 |
| 15 | MF | (Netherlands) NED | Bobby Petta | 5 | 0 | 2 | 0 | 0 | 0 | 1 | 0 | 2 | 0 |
| 16 | DF | (Denmark) DEN | Ulrik Laursen | 36 | 0 | 22 | 0 | 3 | 0 | 2 | 0 | 7+2 | 0 |
| 17 | DF | (France) FRA | Didier Agathe | 40 | 0 | 24+3 | 0 | 0 | 0 | 2 | 0 | 10+1 | 0 |
| 18 | MF | (Northern Ireland) NIR | Neil Lennon | 46 | 0 | 28 | 0 | 1 | 0 | 3 | 0 | 14 | 0 |
| 19 | MF | (Bulgaria) BUL | Stiliyan Petrov | 50 | 14 | 33+1 | 12 | 0 | 0 | 0+2 | 0 | 14 | 2 |
| 20 | GK | (Scotland) SCO | Rab Douglas | 38 | 0 | 21 | 0 | 0 | 0 | 3 | 0 | 14 | 0 |
| 21 | GK | (Sweden) SWE | Magnus Hedman | 10 | 0 | 8 | 0 | 1 | 0 | 1 | 0 | 0 | 0 |
| 22 | GK | (Scotland) SCO | David Marshall | 1 | 0 | 0 | 0 | 0+1 | 0 | 0 | 0 | 0 | 0 |
| 23 | DF | (Slovakia) SVK | Stanislav Varga | 2 | 0 | 1 | 0 | 1 | 0 | 0 | 0 | 0 | 0 |
| 24 | MF | (Republic of Ireland) IRL | Colin Healy | 5 | 0 | 0+1 | 0 | 2 | 0 | 1 | 0 | 1 | 0 |
| 26 | GK | (Spain) ESP | Javier Broto | 10 | 0 | 7+1 | 0 | 2 | 0 | 0 | 0 | 0 | 0 |
| 29 | FW | (Scotland) SCO | Shaun Maloney | 30 | 5 | 5+15 | 3 | 1+2 | 0 | 2+1 | 1 | 2+2 | 1 |
| 30 | MF | (England) ENG | Steve Guppy | 25 | 0 | 12+5 | 0 | 2 | 0 | 0 | 0 | 3+3 | 0 |
| 32 | FW | (Scotland) SCO | Simon Lynch | 1 | 0 | 0 | 0 | 0 | 0 | 0 | 0 | 0+1 | 0 |
| 35 | DF | (Sweden) SWE | Johan Mjallby | 24 | 3 | 14 | 3 | 2 | 0 | 1 | 0 | 7 | 0 |
| 39 | MF | (Scotland) SCO | Jamie Smith | 25 | 1 | 3+10 | 0 | 3 | 1 | 4 | 0 | 1+4 | 0 |
| 40 | DF | (Scotland) SCO | Stephen Crainey | 19 | 0 | 3+10 | 0 | 1+1 | 0 | 2 | 0 | 1+1 | 0 |
| 41 | DF | (Scotland) SCO | John Kennedy | 2 | 0 | 0 | 0 | 0 | 0 | 0+1 | 0 | 1 | 0 |
| 43 | MF | (Republic of Ireland) IRL | Liam Miller | 2 | 0 | 0 | 0 | 0 | 0 | 0+1 | 0 | 0+1 | 0 |

== Team statistics ==
=== League table ===
| Pos | Team | Pld | W | D | L | GF | GA | GD | Pts | Qualification or relegation (Note: Teams played each other three times (33 matches), before the league split into two groups (the top six and the bottom six) for the last five matches.) |
|---|---|---|---|---|---|---|---|---|---|---|
| 1 | Rangers (C) | 38 | 31 | 4 | 3 | 101 | 28 | +73 | 97 | Qualification for the Champions League third qualifying round |
| 2 | Celtic | 38 | 31 | 4 | 3 | 98 | 26 | +72 | 97 | Qualification for the Champions League second qualifying round |
| 3 | Heart of Midlothian | 38 | 18 | 9 | 11 | 57 | 51 | +6 | 63 | Qualification for the UEFA Cup first round |
| 4 | Kilmarnock | 38 | 16 | 9 | 13 | 47 | 56 | −9 | 57 | |
| 5 | Dunfermline Athletic | 38 | 13 | 7 | 18 | 54 | 71 | −17 | 46 | |

Source: Scottish Professional Football League
Rules for classification: 1) Points; 2) Goal difference; 3) Goals scored
(C) Champions

== Transfers ==
=== In ===
| Date | Player | From | Fee |
|---|---|---|---|
| 31 May 2002 | (Spain) David Fernández | (Scotland) Livingston | £1,000,000 |
| 1 August 2002 | (Sweden) Magnus Hedman | (England) Coventry City | £1,500,000 |
| 1 August 2002 | (Denmark) Ulrik Laursen | (Scotland) Hibernian | £1,500,000 |
| 24 January 2003 | (Spain) Javier Sánchez Broto | (Scotland) Livingston | Free |
| 18 February 2003 | (Slovakia) Stanislav Varga | (England) Sunderland | Free |

=== Out ===
| Date | Player | To | Fee |
|---|---|---|---|
| 21 May 2002 | (Russia) Dmitri Kharine | (England) Hornchurch | Free |
| 21 May 2002 | (Republic of Ireland) Jim Goodwin | (England) Stockport County | Free |
| 1 June 2002 | (Slovakia) Ľubomír Moravčík | (Japan) JEF United Chiba | Free |
| 22 June 2002 | (Denmark) Morten Wieghorst | (Denmark) Brøndby IF | Free |
| 1 July 2002 | (Republic of Ireland) David van Zanten | (Scotland) St Mirren | Free |
| 7 January 2003 | (Scotland) Simon Lynch | (England) Preston North End | £130,000 |
| 9 January 2003 | (Scotland) Jonathan Gould | (England) Preston North End | Free |
| 4 February 2003 | (Scotland) Paul Shields | (Scotland) Clyde | Free |

- Expenditure: ▼£4,000,000
- Income: ▲£130,000
- Total loss/gain: ▼£3,870,000
