= Markel Areitio =

Spanish footballer

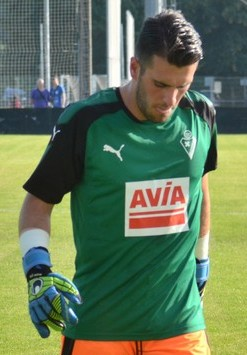
- Areitio with Eibar in 2017

Personal information
- Full name: Markel Areitio Cedrún
- Date of birth: 7 September 1996 (age 30)
- Place of birth: Iurreta, Spain
- Height: 1.80 m (5 ft 11 in)
- Position: Goalkeeper

Team information
- Current team: Durango

Youth career
- 2006–2010: Athletic Bilbao
- 2010–2012: Iurretako
- 2012–2015: Athletic Bilbao

Senior career*
| Years | Team | Apps | (Gls) |
| 2014–2015 | Basconia | 10 | (0) |
| 2015–2016 | Durango | 32 | (0) |
| 2016–2019 | Vitoria | 57 | (0) |
| 2016 | Eibar | 1 | (0) |
| 2020 | Izarra | 10 | (0) |
| 2021–2022 | Barakaldo | 3 | (0) |
| 2022–2023 | Lagun Onak | 17 | (0) |
| 2023– | Durango | 53 | (0) |
- * Club domestic league appearances and goals as of 19:12, 27 January 2026 (UTC)

Markel Areitio Cedrún (born 7 September 1996) is a Spanish footballer who plays as a goalkeeper for Tercera Federación club SCD Durango.

== Career ==
Born in Iurreta, Biscay, Areitio played youth football for Iurretako KT and Athletic Bilbao. He made his debut as a senior for the latter's farm team in 2014, in the Tercera División.

Areitio was released by Athletic on 8 June 2015, signing for SCD Durango the following month. In July 2016 he moved to fellow fourth-tier CD Vitoria, SD Eibar's reserves.

On 17 September 2016, Areitio was called up to the main squad for a La Liga match against Sevilla FC, as starter Asier Riesgo was suspended. Later that day, he came on as a second-half substitute for Bebé in a 1–1 draw at the Ipurua Municipal Stadium after Yoel was sent off.

After leaving Eibar in June 2019, a brief spell in the Segunda División B with CD Izarra notwithstanding, Areitio plied his trade at amateur clubs in his native Basque Country.

== Personal life ==
Areitio comes from a family of goalkeepers: his grandfather Serafin Cedrún played for Barakaldo, his great-uncle Carmelo Cedrún was a Spanish international, while his uncle Andoni Cedrún appeared in more than 300 league matches for Real Zaragoza. Another uncle, Carmelo Mardaras, also represented Barakaldo, although as an outfield player.
