= Carmelo Cedrún =

Spanish football player and manager (1930–2026)

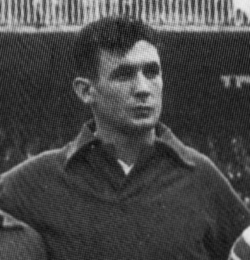
- Cedrún in 1958

Personal information
- Full name: Carmelo Cedrún Ochandátegui
- Date of birth: 6 December 1930
- Place of birth: Amorebieta-Etxano, Spain
- Date of death: 6 July 2026 (aged 95)
- Place of death: Spain
- Height: 1.82 m (6 ft 0 in)
- Position: Goalkeeper

Youth career
- Amorebieta

Senior career*
Years	Team	Apps	(Gls)
1949–1950	Amorebieta		
1950–1964	Athletic Bilbao	334	(0)
1964–1967	Español	82	(0)
1968	Baltimore Bays	23	(0)
Total		439	(0)

International career
1955–1956	Spain B	2	(0)
1954–1963	Spain	13	(0)

Managerial career
- 1969: Durango
- 1969–1972: Barakaldo
- 1972: Logroñés
- 1973–1975: Cultural Leonesa
- 1975–1977: Celta
- 1977–1979: Murcia
- 1979–1980: Celta
- 1980–1981: Barakaldo
- 1982–1983: Jaén
- 1985–1988: Linense
- 1989: Linense
- * Club domestic league appearances and goals

Carmelo Cedrún Ochandátegui (6 December 1930 – 6 July 2026) was a Spanish football player and manager.

He spent most of his 19-year career at Athletic Bilbao, making more than 400 competitive appearances for the club while winning the 1955–56 La Liga and three Copa del Generalísimo trophies. He then played four years with Español, and subsequently had a brief spell in the United States before retiring in 1968.

Cedrún represented Spain at the 1962 World Cup. After retiring, he worked as a coach, including at Celta but mostly at various lower-league Spanish teams.

== Club career ==
Born in Amorebieta-Etxano, Cedrún was a goalkeeper who started playing professionally with local giants Athletic Bilbao, making his first-team debut on 15 April 1951 in a 3–0 home win against Sevilla FC and quickly becoming first-choice. In the 1955–56 season, as the Basques won La Liga, he only conceded 31 goals while playing all 30 matches, and appeared in 402 official games during his 14-year spell.

Late into the 1963–64 campaign, having lost his place to another future club legend, José Ángel Iribar, Cedrún joined RCD Español also of the top division, again returning to starting duties. He retired at 38 in the United States, with the Baltimore Bays.

Shortly after retiring, Cedrún moved into coaching, starting in his region with SCD Durango and Barakaldo CF. Most of his career was spent in the lower leagues, his only top-flight experience coming in 1976–77 with RC Celta de Vigo, with the team ranking second-bottom.

== International career ==
Cedrún earned 13 caps for the Spain national team, his debut coming on 14 March 1954 as the nation battled with Turkey for a spot at the 1954 FIFA World Cup; Spain won 4–2 on aggregate (rule did not apply at the time) and, after a draw in the third match, lost after a drawing of lots.

He was then selected for the 1962 World Cup, playing two games out of three as the country exited in the group stage.

== Personal life and death ==
Cedrún's son, Andoni, was also a footballer – and a goalkeeper. He too represented Athletic but with little success, appearing mostly for Real Zaragoza in another lengthy career.

Additionally, Cedrún's younger brother and nephew both played for Barakaldo, and his great-nephew Markel Areitio was also a goalkeeper developed at Athletic.

Cedrún died on 6 July 2026, at the age of 95.

== Honours ==
Athletic Bilbao

- La Liga: 1955–56
- Copa del Generalísimo: 1955, 1956, 1958

== See also ==
- List of Athletic Bilbao players (+200 appearances)
- List of La Liga players (400+ appearances)
