= Iñigo Lizarralde =

Spanish footballer (born 1966)

Personal information
- Full name: Iñigo Lizarralde Lazkano
- Date of birth: 6 August 1966 (age 60)
- Place of birth: Bilbao, Spain
- Height: 1.78 m (5 ft 10 in)
- Positions: Midfielder; right back

Youth career
- Athletic Bilbao

Senior career*
Years	Team	Apps	(Gls)
1984–1990	Athletic Bilbao	65	(0)
1984–1987	Bilbao Athletic	81	(6)
1990–1995	Zaragoza	96	(1)
1995–1997	Lleida	46	(0)
1997–1998	Amurrio	17	(0)
Total		305	(7)

International career
1985	Spain U19	1	(0)
	Spain U20	5	(0)
	Spain U21	10	(0)
- * Club domestic league appearances and goals

Iñigo Lizarralde Lazkano (born 6 August 1966) is a Spanish former footballer who played as a midfielder or right-back. He played 161 La Liga games for Athletic Bilbao and Real Zaragoza, winning the Copa del Rey and the UEFA Cup Winners' Cup in consecutive seasons with the latter.

== Club career ==
Born in Bilbao in the Basque Country, Lizarralde came through the youth system of local Athletic Bilbao. On 9 September 1984, shortly after turning 18, he made his La Liga debut in a 3–0 loss away to Sevilla as a half-time substitute for Luis Fernando Fernández; both teams were playing their youths due to a professionals' strike.

In August 1990, Lizarralde transferred to Real Zaragoza on a three-year deal for a transfer fee of 25 million Spanish pesetas and an annual salary of 8 million. He arrived to replace Juan Vizcaíno, who had left for Atlético Madrid. In his first season, the club survived after winning a promotion/relegation playoff against Real Murcia. He scored his only top-flight goal on 20 June 1993, opening a 2–2 draw at Atlético Madrid in the last game of the season. Six days later he played the 1993 Copa del Rey final as a 61st-minute substitute for Narcís Julià, in a 2–0 loss to Real Madrid at the Mestalla Stadium.

Lizarralde played along the way as Zaragoza won the Copa del Rey in 1994 and the UEFA Cup Winners' Cup in 1995, but was unused in both finals. In July 1995 he joined Segunda División club Lleida on a two-year deal.

After retiring as a player, Lizarralde worked for Athletic Bilbao and its affiliates. In the 2010s, he was assistant manager to Cuco Ziganda and Gaizka Garitano at reserve team Bilbao Athletic. He moved to farm team Basconia in December 2021, helping Carlos Gurpegui. In 2023, he became a match analyst for the first team.

== International career ==
Lizarralde was part of the Spain under-20 team that finished runners-up to Brazil at the 1985 FIFA World Youth Championship in the Soviet Union.
