= Sergi López (footballer) =

Spanish footballer

- López (right) attending a match with his brother Gerard

Personal information
- Full name: Sergi López Segú
- Date of birth: 6 October 1967
- Place of birth: Granollers, Spain
- Date of death: 4 November 2006 (aged 39)
- Place of death: Granollers, Spain
- Height: 1.80 m (5 ft 11 in)
- Position: Centre-back

Youth career
- Barcelona

Senior career*
| Years | Team | Apps | (Gls) |
| 1986–1991 | Barcelona B | 34 | (5) |
| 1987–1991 | Barcelona | 17 | (0) |
| 1991–1992 | Mallorca | 22 | (2) |
| 1992–1995 | Zaragoza | 23 | (0) |
| 1995–1996 | Gavà | 6 | (1) |
| Total | | 102 | (8) |

International career
| 1987–1989 | Spain U21 | 3 | (0) |
- * Club domestic league appearances and goals

Sergi López Segú (6 October 1967 – 4 November 2006) was a Spanish footballer who played as a central defender.

He played professionally for three clubs during his career, mainly Barcelona. He appeared in 62 La Liga matches over eight seasons (two goals), also representing in the competition Mallorca and Zaragoza.

After some personal problems, López (the older brother of Barcelona and Valencia's Gerard López) died by suicide in 2006 at the age of 39.

== Club career ==
Born in Granollers, Barcelona, Catalonia, López was a promising talent in his early years, and both FC Barcelona and Real Madrid were interested in signing him for its youth squads. The former's scout, Oriol Tort, whom at that time also followed players like Sergi Barjuán and Pep Guardiola, convinced the López family to choose his club.

López started out in Barcelona's cantera, with younger brothers Juli and Gerard following later. He made his first-team debut on 6 November 1988, in a 0–0 away draw against Real Valladolid where he came on as a 46th-minute substitute for Gary Lineker. Including Copa del Rey and European matches, he eventually totalled less than 30 appearances, as Barça won one La Liga championship, two Spanish Cups and the 1988–89 edition of the UEFA Cup Winners' Cup to which he contributed one hour of play in a 0–0 home draw with Aarhus Gymnastikforening in the quarter-finals' second leg.

In summer 1991, López joined RCD Mallorca, but signed for fellow top-flight side Real Zaragoza after only one season. Although he never featured much, he still helped the Aragonese to a domestic cup, being discarded by manager Víctor Fernández for the final of the following Cup Winners' Cup.

After a short spell with modest CF Gavà in the Segunda División B, the 28-year-old López retired due to recurrent knee problems.

== Post-retirement and death ==
After his football career, López moved to Argentina where he married, and where his only child was born. The marriage failed eventually and this, in combination with the early end of his playing days, resulted in clinical depression. While still in Argentina he was taken to a psychiatric hospital, but was forced to return to Spain due to financial problems; he committed suicide by throwing himself under a train on 4 November 2006, at 39.

López's funeral, held on 6 November, was attended by many notable people from within the world of football. Former teammates Guillermo Amor, Txiki Begiristain, Guardiola and Sergi (Barcelona), Xavi Aguado and Santiago Aragón (Zaragoza) and Josep Serer (Mallorca) were all present, alongside Barcelona president Joan Laporta and player Samuel Eto'o, former Valencia CF president Pedro Cortés and the full squad and staff of AS Monaco FC (to support brother Gerard, who represented the Monegasque club).

== Honours ==
Barcelona

- UEFA Cup Winners' Cup: 1988–89
- Copa Catalunya: 1991

Zaragoza

- Copa del Rey: 1993–94
