= Gus Poyet =

Uruguayan footballer and manager (born 1967)

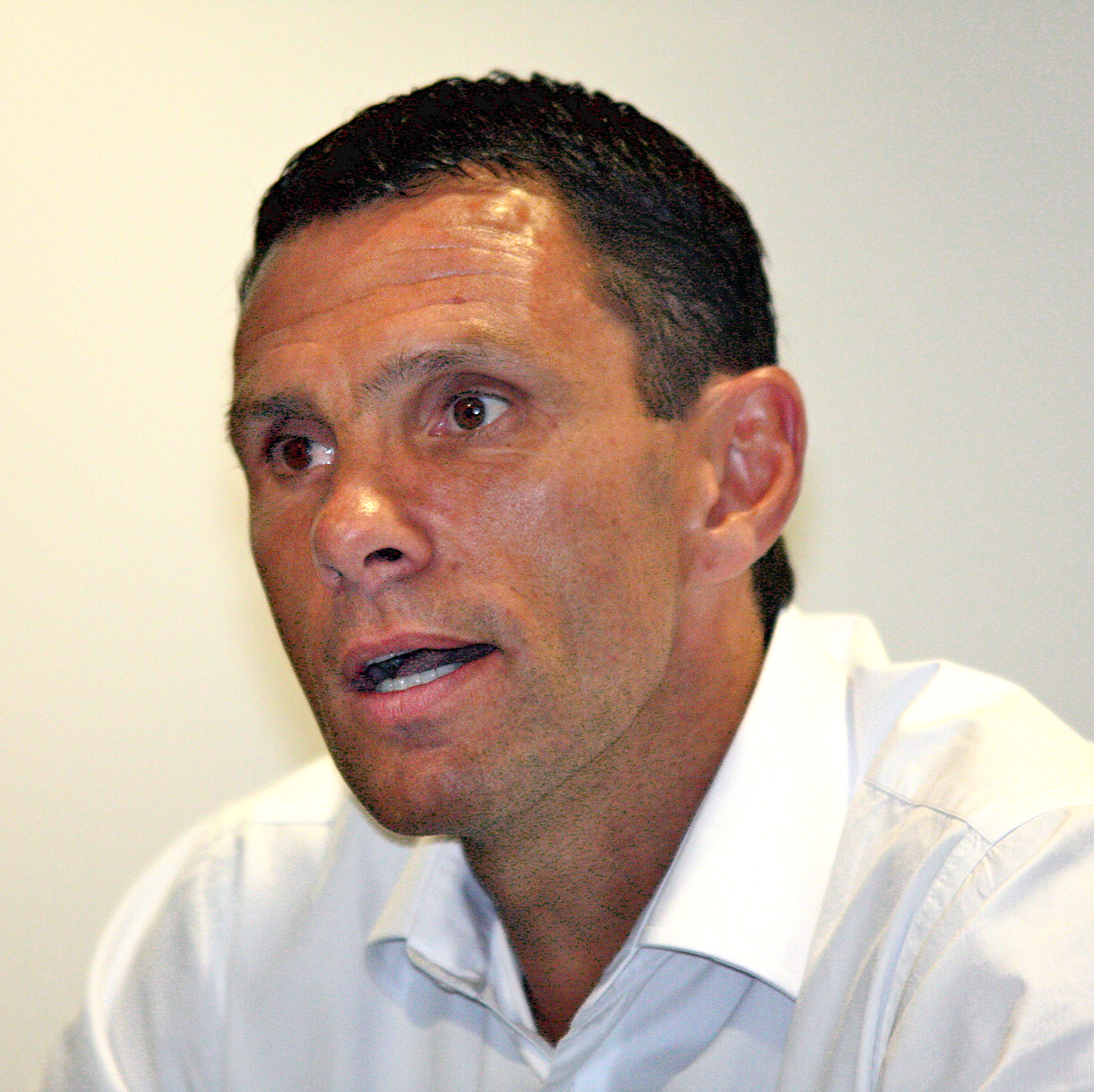
- Poyet in 2010

Personal information
- Full name: Gustavo Augusto Poyet Domínguez
- Date of birth: 15 November 1967 (age 59)
- Place of birth: Montevideo, Uruguay
- Height: 1.88 m (6 ft 2 in)
- Position: Midfielder

Youth career
- 1986–1988: River Plate (Montevideo)

Senior career*
Years	Team	Apps	(Gls)
1988–1989	Grenoble	37	(8)
1989–1990	River Plate (Montevideo)	78	(28)
1990	Club Atlético Bella Vista		
1990–1997	Zaragoza	239	(63)
1997–2001	Chelsea	105	(36)
2001–2004	Tottenham Hotspur	82	(18)
2006	Swindon Town	0	(0)
Total		463	(125)

International career
1993–2000	Uruguay	26	(3)

Managerial career
- 2009–2013: Brighton & Hove Albion
- 2013–2015: Sunderland
- 2015–2016: AEK Athens
- 2016: Real Betis
- 2016–2017: Shanghai Shenhua
- 2018: Bordeaux
- 2021: Universidad Católica
- 2022–2024: Greece
- 2024–2025: Jeonbuk Hyundai Motors
- 2026: Al-Khaleej
Medal record
Men's football
Representing Uruguay
Copa América
Winner	1995 Uruguay
- * Club domestic league appearances and goals

Gustavo Augusto Poyet Domínguez (Spanish pronunciation: [ˈɡus poˈʝet]; born 15 November 1967) is a Uruguayan professional football manager and former footballer. He last served as the head coach of Saudi Pro League club Al-Khaleej.

Poyet played as a midfielder and began his career with short spells at Grenoble and River Plate. He then spent seven years at Real Zaragoza, with whom he won the Copa del Rey and the UEFA Cup Winners' Cup. In 1997, Poyet moved to Chelsea on a free transfer and helped the club win the FA Cup and the UEFA Cup Winners' Cup. In 2001, he moved to Tottenham Hotspur, where he saw out the remainder of his career. He was also part of the Uruguay side which won the 1995 Copa América.

After his playing career ended, Poyet moved into coaching. He served as assistant manager to Dennis Wise at Swindon Town and Leeds United, and Juande Ramos at Tottenham Hotspur. In November 2009, Poyet was appointed manager of Brighton & Hove Albion and in his first full season led the club to promotion as League One Champions, for which he was named League One Manager of the Year by the LMA. In October 2013, he was hired by Premier League team Sunderland and guided them to the League Cup final in his first season, but was sacked in March 2015 after a poor run of results. He later had spells at Super League Greece side AEK Athens, La Liga club Real Betis, Chinese Super League team Shanghai Shenhua, Bordeaux of Ligue 1, Universidad Católica in Chile and Greece.

== Playing career ==
=== Club career ===
Born in Montevideo, a goalscoring midfielder, he began his career with spells at Grenoble and River Plate. Poyet moved to Club Atlético Bella Vista in early 1990 and won the 1990 Campeonato Uruguayo Primera División before moving to Real Zaragoza in June or July 1990; winning the Copa del Rey in 1994 and the Cup Winners' Cup a year later, beating Arsenal in the final. He became Zaragoza's longest-serving foreign player, and scored 60 goals in 240 games for the club.

Poyet joined Chelsea on a free transfer in June 1997. Not long into his first season at the London club, he suffered cruciate ligament damage, this meant he missed the victorious 1998 Football League Cup Final but recovered to play in the team's successful Cup Winners' Cup Final against VfB Stuttgart. The following year, he contributed 14 goals – making him the club's second highest scorer – to help Chelsea finish third in the Premiership, including a crucial headed goal in 1–0 win against Leeds United. He also scored the winner for Chelsea in the 1998 UEFA Super Cup against Real Madrid. In the 1999–2000 season, he scored 18 goals (which again made him Chelsea's second highest scorer), with a scissors-kick volley against Sunderland, a long range strike against Lazio, and both of Chelsea's goals in the FA Cup semi-final against Newcastle United, among the most memorable, as the team won the FA Cup and reached the UEFA Champions League quarter-finals.

With the arrival of new manager Claudio Ranieri in September 2000, Chelsea was a team in transition. With Ranieri seeking to reduce the average age of the squad, Poyet became surplus to requirements and requested a transfer.

In 145 appearances for Chelsea, Poyet scored 49 goals.

Poyet joined Tottenham Hotspur in May 2001 for around £2.2 million. He scored 14 goals in his debut season for Spurs and helped his team reach the League Cup final, but they lost 2–1 to Blackburn Rovers. His time at the club was blighted by injuries, and he again sustained cruciate ligament damage in August 2002, but still managed to score 23 goals in 98 games.

Although registered as a Swindon Town player in 2006 as emergency cover, Poyet mainly served as the assistant manager on the touchline and did not make a single appearance for the club.

=== International career ===
Poyet was a Uruguay international, making his international debut on 13 July 1993 in a friendly match against Peru (1–2). After 67 minutes, he was substituted by Carlos Aguilera.

Poyet helped his country win the Copa América in 1995. In doing so, he was voted as the best player in his position at the tournament.

He won 26 caps in total, scoring three goals.

== Managerial career ==
=== Early coaching ===
In July 2006, he became a player and assistant manager at Swindon Town alongside ex-Chelsea teammate, Dennis Wise. Both Poyet and Wise were given permission to talk about forming the new Leeds United management team on 23 October 2006 and looked set to take the place of caretaker manager, John Carver, until Swindon withdrew permission due to disagreements over compensation. On 24 October 2006, Poyet was confirmed as assistant manager of Leeds with Dennis Wise as the manager. On 29 October 2007, Poyet rejoined his former club Tottenham Hotspur to work alongside new head coach Juande Ramos as a first team coach with Marcos Álvarez as a fitness coach. During his first season as assistant manager at White Hart Lane, he won the 2007–08 League Cup, beating Chelsea 2–1 after extra time in the Final after a penalty from Dimitar Berbatov in normal time and a header early into extra time from Jonathan Woodgate.

On 25 October 2008, Poyet parted company with Tottenham Hotspur along with manager Juande Ramos, first team coach Marcos Álvarez and sporting director Damien Comolli.

=== Brighton & Hove Albion ===
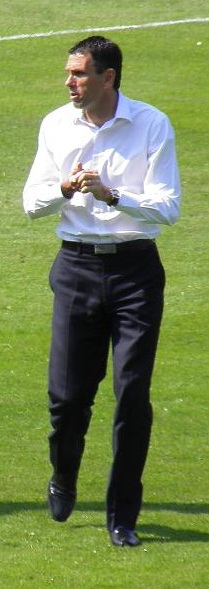
Poyet as Brighton manager in 2011

On 10 November 2009, Poyet was announced as the new manager of English League One side Brighton & Hove Albion on a one-and-a-half-year contract. Former Tottenham teammate Mauricio Taricco was also announced as Poyet's assistant manager. He steered the club to safety as he had a brilliant start to his career at Brighton by going to Southampton and winning 3–1. He started the 2010–11 season by making a number of signings including Gordon Greer, Radostin Kishishev, Liam Bridcutt, Matt Sparrow, Casper Ankergren and Ashley Barnes. He also signed a new four-year contract along with Taricco.

The season started with five wins from the first eight games putting Brighton top of the League One table. Brighton started the year 2011 with a 5–0 home win on New Year's Day against Leyton Orient. Most notable was a run of eight straight league victories in March, leaving the club 13 points clear at the top with games in hand over all of their closest rivals with the exception of Southampton. Brighton secured promotion to the Championship following a 4–3 home win over Dagenham & Redbridge, Ashley Barnes scoring the winner in the 63rd minute. The League One title was clinched on 16 April 2011, as Brighton beat Walsall 3–1, having been top without slipping since the eighth game of the season and with four games of the season still to play. On 23 May 2011, Poyet was voted LMA League One Manager of the Year for his achievements in the 2010–11 season – his first full season as a football manager.

During pre-season 2011, Poyet twice broke the club's record transfer-fee in signing Will Buckley and Craig Mackail-Smith, and also brought in former Spain and Valencia playmaker Vicente on a free transfer. After an unbeaten start to the 2011–12 season, Poyet was named as Championship manager of the month for August 2011. Poyet shortly after signed a new and improved five-year contract to remain at the club until 2016. In March 2012, Poyet won the Outstanding Managerial Achievement Award at the Football League Awards ceremony, beating Crystal Palace manager Dougie Freedman and former Huddersfield Town boss Lee Clark.

On 23 June 2013, Brighton released an official statement declaring that Poyet had been informed that "his employment has been terminated with immediate effect", following a disciplinary process. Poyet said that he was only made aware of his sacking when a member of the BBC production staff handed him a printout of the club statement, whilst working as a pundit for BBC Three's coverage of the Spain vs. Nigeria group game in the FIFA Confederations Cup.

=== Sunderland ===
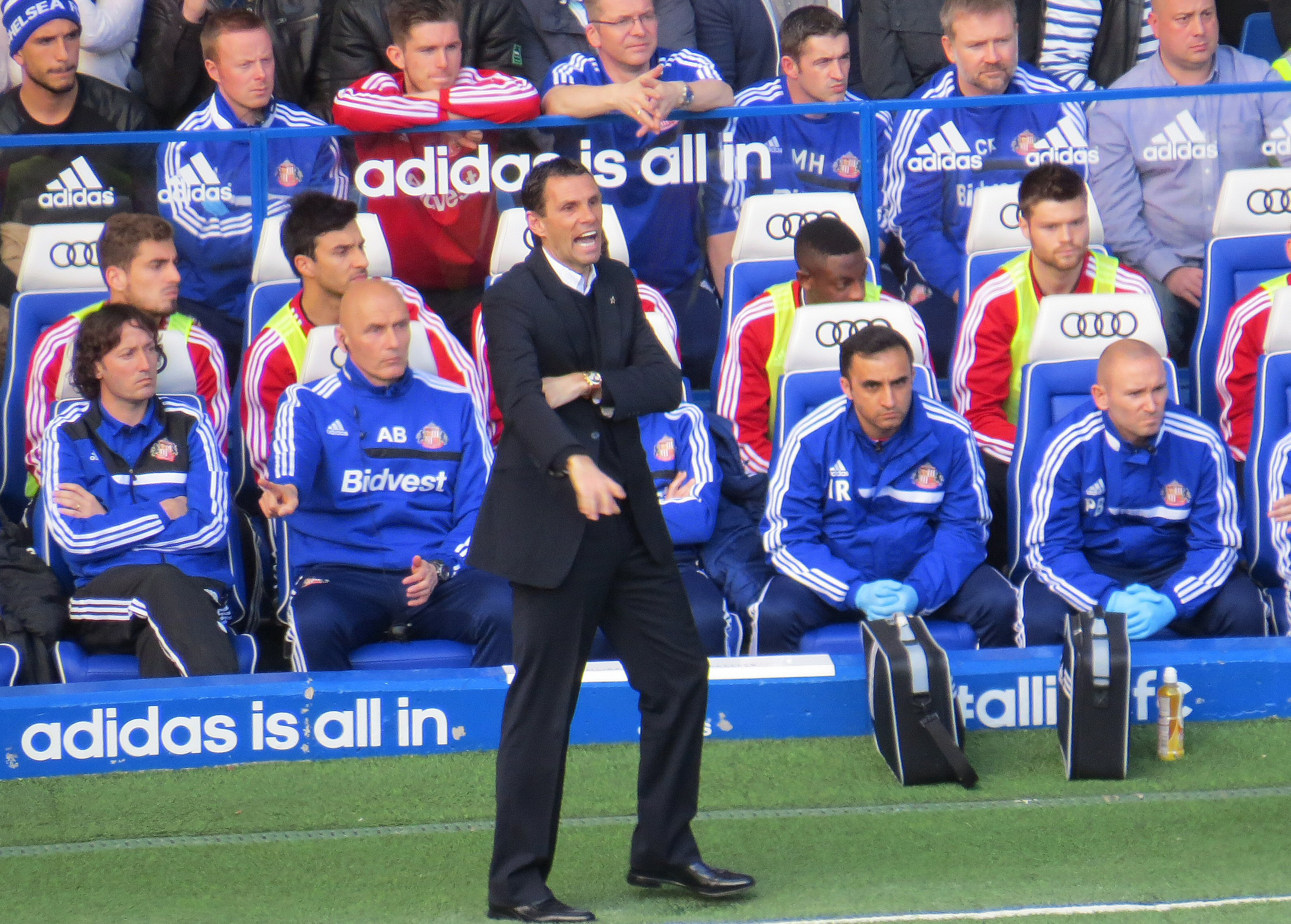
Poyet on the touchline as Sunderland manager away to Chelsea in April 2014

On 8 October 2013, it was announced that Poyet had been appointed as head coach at Sunderland on a two-year contract, becoming the first Uruguayan to manage in the Premier League. Eleven days later in his first match in charge, they lost 4–0 away to Swansea City. His second game in charge, and first at the Stadium of Light, resulted in a 2–1 win against local rivals Newcastle United on 27 October.

In his first season in charge, he took Sunderland to the League Cup Final after a penalty shootout win over Manchester United in the semi-finals. On 19 April 2014, Poyet defeated José Mourinho in his first-ever home league defeat in the Premier League as Chelsea manager, a 2–1 win to Sunderland at Stamford Bridge. Poyet led Sunderland to a 2–0 win at home to West Bromwich Albion on 7 May to guarantee Premier League safety with one game remaining, performing "a miracle" in his own words by arresting a decline that saw Sunderland seven points adrift of safety as late as 7 April, when they lost 5–1 to Tottenham Hotspur. Defeat to Everton in their following league game made avoiding relegation look like a near impossible task for the club, but Sunderland, under Poyet's stewardship, earned 13 points out of a possible 15 in their following five league games. Poyet signed a new two-year contract at Sunderland on 28 May 2014.

The club sacked Poyet on 16 March 2015. At the time of his sacking, they were in 17th place in the league, one point above the relegation places.

=== AEK Athens ===
On 29 October 2015, AEK Athens reported that Poyet had agreed in principle to be the club's manager until summer 2016. In February 2016, he guided his team to successive wins against neighbours Olympiacos and Panathinaikos. He was sacked on 19 April 2016 after the team finished third in the league and awaited a Greek Cup semi-final; the board had taken issue with him informing the press before them that he would leave at the end of the campaign.

=== Betis ===
On 9 May 2016, Poyet had signed a two-year deal with Real Betis. On 12 November 2016, he was sacked and replaced by Víctor Sánchez.

=== Shanghai Shenhua ===
On 29 November 2016, Poyet became the manager of Chinese Super League side Shanghai Shenhua. Despite being blamed by the public for poor performance in the league and resigning on 11 September, he was still appreciated by some fans for his contribution to the team's championship in 2017 Chinese FA Cup later in November, including a 1–0 home victory over classic rival Beijing Guoan in 4th round, and a 3–1 away victory over Shandong Luneng in quarter final.

=== Bordeaux ===
On 20 January 2018, Poyet became the manager of Ligue 1 side Bordeaux taking them in 4 months from 14th in the table to 6th and qualifying for European competitions. . In August, he was suspended by the club after criticising the sale of Gaëtan Laborde to Montpellier. He was fired and replaced by Ricardo Gomes on 5 September.

=== Universidad Católica ===
On 28 February 2021, Poyet became the manager of Chilean Primera División club Universidad Católica. He began his tenure by winning the delayed 2020 Supercopa de Chile against rivals Colo-Colo and made the last 16 of the 2021 Copa Libertadores, but left by mutual consent at the end of August with the worst campaign in the previous 10 years.

=== Greece ===
On 3 February 2022, Poyet became the manager of Greece. He guided the team to four victories from their four opening fixtures in League C of the 2022 UEFA Nations League, helping Greece earn promotion to League B for the following campaign. However, Greece then narrowly failed to qualify for UEFA Euro 2024, losing a playoff final on penalties to Georgia on 26 March 2024; Poyet's contract, which was set to expire five days later, was not renewed.

=== Jeonbuk Hyundai Motors ===
On 24 December 2024, Poyet became the manager of K League 1 club Jeonbuk Hyundai Motors. On December 8, 2025, after winning the double (Korea K League 1 Champions and Korea FA Cup Champions), he announced his intention to step down as manager at the end of this season.

=== Al-Khaleej ===
In April 2026, Poyet was appointed as head coach of Saudi Pro League side Al-Khaleej until the end of the season.

== Personal life ==
Poyet is married to Madelon González with whom he has two sons: Diego (born 1995) and Matias (born 1993). Diego is also a midfielder, making his professional debut in 2014 for Charlton Athletic before moving to West Ham United, and has represented England at youth international level.

Poyet's father was Olympic basketball player Washington Poyet, while his brother Marcelo also played the sport professionally in South America. Poyet introduced basketball to Sunderland academy training sessions, believing it to share many attributes with football, particularly marking.

== Career statistics ==
=== Club ===
Appearances and goals by club, season and competition
Club	Season	League			National cup (Note: Includes Copa del Rey, FA Cup)		League cup (Note: Includes Football League Cup)		Europe		Other		Total	
Club	Season	Division	Apps	Goals	Apps	Goals	Apps	Goals	Apps	Goals	Apps	Goals	Apps	Goals
Zaragoza	1990–91	La Liga	31	7	5	2	—		—		2 (Note: Appearances in La Liga play-offs)	2	38	11
Zaragoza	1991–92	La Liga	33	3	5	1	—		—		—		38	4
Zaragoza	1992–93	La Liga	33	6	5	0	—		5 (Note: Appearances in UEFA Cup)	3	—		43	9
Zaragoza	1993–94	La Liga	34	11	12	5	—		—		—		46	16
Zaragoza	1994–95	La Liga	34	11	1	0	—		7 (Note: Appearances in UEFA Cup Winners' Cup)	3	2 (Note: Appearances in Spanish Supercup)	0	44	14
Zaragoza	1995–96	La Liga	36	11	4	0	—		6	1	—		46	12
Zaragoza	1996–97	La Liga	38	14	1	0	—		—		—		39	14
Zaragoza	Total		239	63	33	8	—		18	7	4	2	294	80
Chelsea	1997–98	Premier League	14	4	0	0	0	0	4	1	1 (Note: Appearance in FA Charity Shield)	0	19	5
Chelsea	1998–99	Premier League	28	11	0	0	3	2	6	0	1 (Note: Appearance in UEFA Super Cup)	1	38	14
Chelsea	1999–2000	Premier League	33	10	6	6	0	0	14 (Note: Appearances in UEFA Champions League)	2	—		53	18
Chelsea	2000–01	Premier League	30	11	3	1	1	0	0	0	1	0	35	12
Chelsea	Total		105	36	9	7	4	2	24	3	3	1	145	49
Tottenham Hotspur	2001–02	Premier League	34	10	4	3	5	1	—		—		43	14
Tottenham Hotspur	2002–03	Premier League	28	5	1	0	1	1	—		—		30	6
Tottenham Hotspur	2003–04	Premier League	20	3	2	0	3	0	—		—		25	3
Tottenham Hotspur	Total		82	18	7	3	9	2	—		—		98	23
Career total			426	117	49	18	13	4	42	10	7	3	537	152

=== International ===
Appearances and goals by national team and year
National team	Year	Apps	Goals
Uruguay	1993	3	0
Uruguay	1994	0	0
Uruguay	1995	12	2
Uruguay	1996	5	1
Uruguay	1997	2	0
Uruguay	1998	0	0
Uruguay	1999	2	0
Uruguay	2000	2	0
Total		26	3

Scores and results list Uruguay's goal tally first, score column indicates score after each Poyet goal.

List of international goals scored by Gus Poyet
No.	Date	Venue	Opponent	Score	Result	Competition
1	25 March 1995	Cotton Bowl, Dallas, United States	United States	2–2	2–2	Friendly
2	5 July 1995	Estadio Centenario, Montevideo, Uruguay	Venezuela	4–1	4–1	1995 Copa América
3	24 April 1996	Brígido Iriarte Stadium, Caracas, Venezuela	Venezuela	2–0	2–0	1998 FIFA World Cup qualification

== Managerial statistics ==
As of match played 20 May 2026

Managerial record by team and tenure
Team	Nat.	From	To	Record								Ref.
Team	Nat.	From	To	G	W	D	L	GF	GA	GD	Win %	Ref.
Brighton & Hove Albion	(England)	10 November 2009	24 June 2013	194	86	59	49	282	206	+76	44.33	
Sunderland	(England)	8 October 2013	16 March 2015	75	23	22	30	82	105	−23	30.67	
AEK Athens	(Greece)	30 October 2015	19 April 2016	28	18	5	5	47	13	+34	64.29	
Real Betis	(Spain)	9 May 2016	12 November 2016	11	3	2	6	11	22	−11	27.27	
Shanghai Shenhua	(China)	29 November 2016	11 September 2017	29	10	7	12	45	46	−1	34.48	
Bordeaux	(France)	20 January 2018	17 August 2018 (Note: Poyet was suspended by Bordeaux on 17 August 2018 and took no further part in managerial duties; he formally left the club some time later.)	21	13	2	6	37	22	+15	61.90	
Universidad Católica	(Chile)	28 February 2021	30 August 2021	31	13	5	13	42	41	+1	41.94	
Greece	(Greece)	11 February 2022	31 March 2024	22	12	4	6	35	15	+20	54.55	
Jeonbuk Hyundai Motors	(South Korea)	24 December 2024	8 December 2025	48	30	11	7	83	42	+41	62.50	
Al-Khaleej	(Saudi Arabia)	21 April 2026	30 June 2026	7	2	0	5	8	16	−8	28.57	
Career Total				466	211	117	138	672	528	+144	45.28	

== Honours ==
=== Player ===
Club Atlético Bella Vista

- Campeonato Uruguayo Primera División: 1990

Real Zaragoza

- Copa del Rey: 1993–94; runner-up: 1992–93
- UEFA Cup Winners' Cup: 1994–95

Chelsea

- FA Cup: 1999–2000
- Football League Cup: 1997–98
- FA Charity Shield: 2000
- UEFA Cup Winners' Cup: 1997–98
- UEFA Super Cup: 1998

Tottenham Hotspur

- Football League Cup runner-up: 2001–02

Uruguay

- Copa América: 1995

=== Manager ===
Brighton & Hove Albion

- Football League One: 2010–11

Sunderland

- Football League Cup runner-up: 2013–14

Universidad Católica

- Supercopa de Chile: 2020

Jeonbuk Hyundai Motors

- K League 1: 2025
- Korea Cup: 2025

Individual

- LMA Football League One Manager of the Year: 2010–11
- Football League One Manager of the Month: September 2010, March 2011
- Football League Award for Outstanding Managerial Achievement: 2011
- K League 1 Manager of the Year: 2025
- K League Manager of the Month: May 2025, June 2025
- Korea Cup Best Manager: 2025
