= Javier Sánchez Broto =

Spanish footballer

Personal information
- Full name: Francisco Javier Sánchez Broto
- Date of birth: 25 August 1971 (age 55)
- Place of birth: Barcelona, Spain
- Height: 1.85 m (6 ft 1 in)
- Position: Goalkeeper

Youth career
- 1985–1990: Zaragoza

Senior career*
Years	Team	Apps	(Gls)
1990–1993	Zaragoza B	68	(0)
1993–1994	Zaragoza	4	(0)
1994–1997	Villarreal	33	(0)
1997–1998	Castellón	25	(0)
1998–2000	Málaga	4	(0)
2000–2001	Airdrieonians	23	(0)
2001–2003	Livingston	47	(0)
2003	Celtic	8	(0)
2003–2004	Murcia	9	(0)
2004–2005	Getafe	20	(0)
2005	Hércules	0	(0)
Total		241	(0)

International career
1993	Spain U21	2	(0)
- * Club domestic league appearances and goals

Francisco Javier Sánchez Broto (born 25 August 1971) is a Spanish retired footballer who played as a goalkeeper.

After eight years in his country where he appeared almost exclusively as a backup, playing for four clubs, he headed to Scotland, where he represented Airdrieonians, Livingston and Celtic.

== Club career ==
Born in Barcelona, Catalonia, Sánchez Broto joined the Real Zaragoza academy at 14, where his failure to make an impression as a forward led to his being used as a goalkeeper. In the 1992–93 edition of La Liga, he appeared in four games for the Aragonese's first team, and subsequently moved to the second division, playing for Villarreal CF and Málaga CF and winning a championship medal with the latter (he only played four league matches over two seasons, however).

In 2000, Sánchez Broto moved to Scottish club Airdrie on a Bosman transfer. During his first year, his team won the Scottish Challenge Cup after the player saved three penalties in the shootout against Livingston. When they ran into financial problems he joined Livingston in March 2001, being an important member of the Scottish First Division-winning side in 2001, while earning himself the SPFA Player of the Season Award. He was cup-tied for Livi's appearance in the semi-finals of the 2000–01 Scottish Cup.

In January 2003, Sánchez Broto joined Celtic, who required a goalkeeper following injuries to Rab Douglas and Magnus Hedman. Broto was cup-tied for Celtic's run to the 2003 UEFA Cup final. He left the club at the end of the campaign, citing a desire to return home, and signed with Real Murcia in the top division for the following season, appearing rarely in an eventual relegation.

Sánchez Broto signed with newly promoted Getafe – the club's first ever appearance in the top flight – in 2004–05. Not an undisputed starter for the Madrid side, he did appear in 20 league matches out of 38, his performances resulting in Marca rating him the third-best goalkeeper in Spain for that season; during his tenure, after losing a bet, he donated a pair of goalkeeper gloves to every goalkeeper in Spain's lower divisions.

After one sole season, 34-year-old Sánchez Broto signed with Hércules in the second level, but retired from professional football shortly after due to injuries. He expressed regret at having to retire so young, and despite his popularity throughout his career, remained self-effacing when looking back. In a 2006 interview given to Diario Equipo, he remarked that he had "enjoyed soccer as a little person of the game and would like to thank everyone who has made it all possible".

== Honours ==
Málaga

- Segunda División: 1998–99

Airdrie

- Scottish Challenge Cup: 2000–01

Livingston

- Scottish First Division: 2000–01
