= Santiago Aragón =

Spanish footballer

Personal information
- Full name: Santiago Aragón Martínez
- Date of birth: 3 April 1968 (age 58)
- Place of birth: Málaga, Spain
- Height: 1.78 m (5 ft 10 in)
- Position: Midfielder

Youth career
- Real Madrid

Senior career*
Years	Team	Apps	(Gls)
1985–1988	Real Madrid B	68	(6)
1988–1993	Real Madrid	18	(1)
1989	→ Español (loan)	8	(0)
1989–1990	→ Logroñés (loan)	21	(3)
1991–1992	→ Valladolid (loan)	18	(3)
1992–1993	→ Zaragoza (loan)	10	(2)
1993–2003	Zaragoza	292	(32)
Total		435	(47)

International career
1985	Spain U18	1	(0)
1989	Spain U21	1	(0)
- * Club domestic league appearances and goals

Santiago Aragón Martínez (born 3 April 1968) is a Spanish former professional footballer who played as a midfielder.

He was a technically evolved player who often assumed playmaker duties, and played mainly for Real Zaragoza, appearing in 362 official matches in 11 seasons – ten in La Liga – and winning three major titles.

== Club career ==
Aragón was born in Málaga, Andalusia. A Real Madrid youth graduate, he played one game for the 1988 league champions, a 0–0 away draw against RC Celta de Vigo on 16 April 1988, also spending two and a half seasons with the reserve team in the Segunda División; barred by Rafael Martín Vázquez first and Gheorghe Hagi afterwards, he was loaned successively to RCD Español and CD Logroñés, both in La Liga, where he only totalled 29 appearances.

Following another loan at Real Valladolid, with top-flight relegation, Aragón's career was threatened with fading into obscurity until he joined Real Zaragoza, first on loan. He would be the Aragonese side's dictator of play for several seasons – providing for the likes of Juan Esnáider, Miguel Pardeza and Gus Poyet – only missing nine matches in his first four seasons while scoring 17 goals himself.

Aragón was part of the side that won the 1995 edition of the UEFA Cup Winners' Cup, having conquered the Copa del Rey the previous campaign. Having contributed four goals to Zaragoza's return to the top division in 2003, he retired aged 35 with 524 competitive appearances to his credit.

In January 2008, Aragón had his first coaching experience, joining his former Zaragoza teammate Ander Garitano's coaching staff at the club. After only one week and two matches (one in the cup), the head manager cited personal reasons for leaving his post, and his assistant followed him.

== Honours ==
Real Madrid

- La Liga: 1987–88
- Supercopa de España: 1990

Zaragoza

- Copa del Rey: 1993–94, 2000–01
- UEFA Cup Winners' Cup: 1994–95
