= Manolo Peña =

Spanish footballer

Personal information
- Full name: Manuel Peña Escontrela
- Date of birth: 18 December 1965
- Place of birth: Lugo, Spain
- Date of death: 13 November 2012 (aged 46)
- Place of death: Ponferrada, Spain
- Position: Forward

Youth career
- Ponferradina

Senior career*
Years	Team	Apps	(Gls)
1982–1983	Ponferradina	21	(9)
1983–1990	Valladolid	148	(24)
1990–1993	Zaragoza	41	(3)
1993–1995	Cádiz	28	(3)
1995–1996	Talavera	24	(1)
1996–2000	Ponferradina		

International career
1983–1984	Spain U18	6	(0)
1985	Spain U19	1	(0)
1985	Spain U20	2	(0)
1985–1987	Spain U21	5	(1)
1988	Spain U23	1	(0)
- * Club domestic league appearances and goals

Manuel "Manolo" Peña Escontrela (18 December 1965 – 13 November 2012) was a Spanish professional footballer who played as a forward.

Over the course of ten seasons, he amassed La Liga totals of 189 games and 27 goals, with Valladolid and Zaragoza.

== Club career ==
Born in Lugo, Galicia, Peña signed at the age of 17 with Real Valladolid, going on to play seven consecutive La Liga seasons with the club, but only appearing in 30 league games his first three combined. His best output for the Castile and León side came in the 1987–88 campaign when he scored eight goals in 29 matches (all starts) to help them finish in eighth position; this included a hat-trick against FC Barcelona at the Camp Nou in a 4–2 win, and another in the home game against the Catalans (1–1 draw).

Still at the professional level, Peña played with Real Zaragoza (top level) and Cádiz CF (being relegated from Segunda División in 1993–94). He retired in June 2000 after six years in the lower leagues, mainly with SD Ponferradina where he started his career.

== International career ==
Peñan earned a total of 14 caps for four Spanish youth teams. He helped the under-20s finish second at the 1985 FIFA World Youth Championship in the Soviet Union, appearing in the group stage against Brazil (0–2 loss) and the Republic of Ireland (4–2 win).

== Later life and death ==
After retiring, Peña settled in Ponferrada and worked in the city council. He died on 13 November 2012 from cancer, at the age of 46.
