= Jesús Solana =

Spanish footballer and manager

Personal information
- Full name: Jesús Ángel Solana Bermejo
- Date of birth: 25 December 1964 (age 61)
- Place of birth: Arnedo, Spain
- Height: 1.79 m (5 ft 10 in)
- Position: Defender

Youth career
- 1980–1984: Real Madrid

Senior career*
Years	Team	Apps	(Gls)
1984–1985	Castilla	28	(3)
1986–1991	Real Madrid	128	(3)
1991–2000	Zaragoza	233	(4)
Total		389	(10)

International career
1980–1981	Spain U16	4	(0)
1983	Spain U18	1	(0)
1986	Spain U21	4	(0)
1987	Spain U23	1	(0)
1988	Spain	1	(0)

Managerial career
- 2003–2005: Zaragoza B
- 2013: Zaragoza B
- * Club domestic league appearances and goals

Jesús Ángel Solana Bermejo (born 25 December 1964) is a Spanish former professional footballer. A defender, he was equally at ease as a left-back or a central defender.

He played 361 La Liga games over the course of 15 seasons, representing Real Madrid (six years) and Zaragoza (nine).

== Club career ==
=== Real Madrid ===
Born in Arnedo, La Rioja, Solana was a product of Real Madrid's youth academy. He was used regularly in five of his six seasons with the capital club's first team, as they won five La Liga titles in a row.

Solana played the full 90 minutes in both legs of the 1986 UEFA Cup final, a 5–3 aggregate win against Germany's 1. FC Köln. He added 20 appearances in the European Cup.

=== Zaragoza ===
However, Solana would be most known for his spell at Real Zaragoza. There, he added one Copa del Rey to his trophy cabinet as well as the memorable 1994–95 edition of the UEFA Cup Winners' Cup against Arsenal, appearing in 290 official matches for the Aragonese.

Having retired in 2000 at age 35, Solana had a three-year coaching spell with the side's reserves, then returned late into the 2012–13 campaign to prevent relegation from Segunda División B, which eventually did not happen.

== International career ==
Solana won one cap for Spain, coming on as a substitute for Quique Sánchez Flores – who would later be his teammate at Zaragoza – in the 83rd minute of a 2–0 home victory over the Republic of Ireland in the 1990 FIFA World Cup qualifiers, on 16 November 1988.

== Honours ==
Real Madrid

- La Liga: 1985–86, 1986–87, 1987–88, 1988–89, 1989–90
- Copa del Rey: 1988–89
- Supercopa de España: 1988, 1989, 1990
- UEFA Cup: 1985–86

Zaragoza

- Copa del Rey: 1993–94
- UEFA Cup Winners' Cup: 1994–95

Spain U21

- UEFA European Under-21 Championship: 1986
