= Narcís Julià =

Spanish footballer and manager

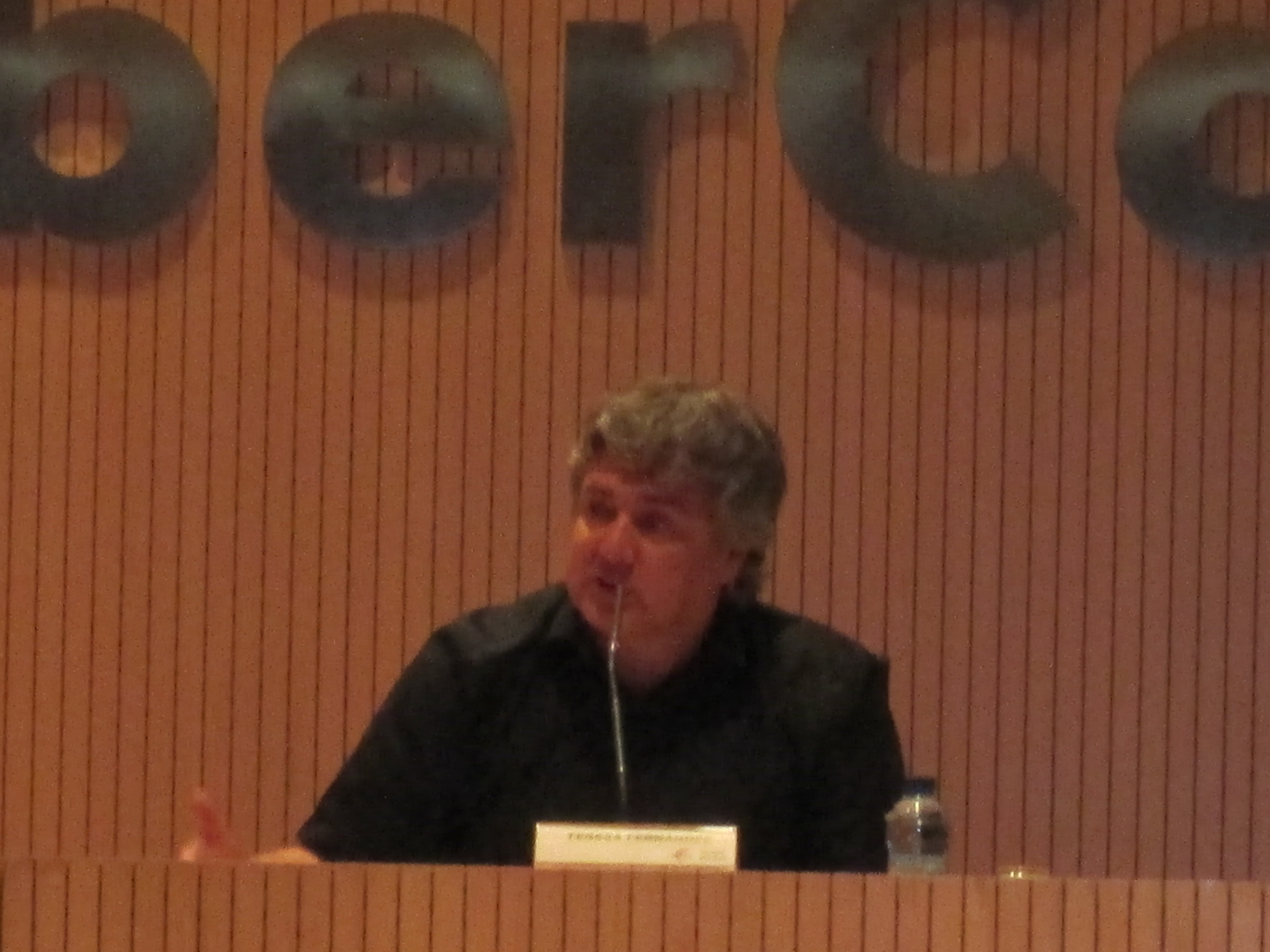
- Julià in 2013

Personal information
- Full name: Narcís Julià Fontané
- Date of birth: 24 May 1963 (age 63)
- Place of birth: Girona, Spain
- Height: 1.78 m (5 ft 10 in)
- Position: Defender

Team information
- Current team: Olympique de Marseille (recruteur)

Youth career
- 1971–1979: Girona

Senior career*
Years	Team	Apps	(Gls)
1979–1982	Girona		
1982–1985	Zaragoza B		
1983–1984	→ Racing Ferrol (loan)	23	(1)
1985–1993	Zaragoza	183	(3)

International career
1993	Catalonia	1	(0)

Managerial career
- 1994: Zaragoza (youth)
- 1994–1998: Zaragoza B (assistant)
- 1998–2000: Zaragoza (assistant)
- 2003: Girona
- 2004–2005: Porto (assistant)
- 2006–2008: Zaragoza (assistant)
- 2009–2010: Girona
- * Club domestic league appearances and goals

Narcís Julià Fontané (born 24 May 1963) is a Spanish retired footballer who played as a defender, and a current manager.

== Playing career ==
Born in Girona, Catalonia, Julià was a Girona FC youth graduate, and was promoted to the first team at the age of just 16. In 1982, he joined Real Zaragoza, being initially assigned to the reserves in Tercera División.

Julià experienced two consecutive promotions with the B-side, and made his first team – and La Liga – debut on 2 February 1986, coming on as a second-half substitute for Dragi Kaličanin in a 6–0 home routing of Celta de Vigo. In July of that year, he was definitely promoted to the main squad.

Julià scored his first goal in the main category of Spanish football on 13 September 1986, netting his team's only in a 1–3 away loss against Real Madrid. He went on to appear regularly for the Aragonese side during the following campaigns, and announced his retirement in November 1993 mainly due to a serious knee injury.

== Manager career ==
After retiring, Julià joined Zaragoza's staff; initially a manager of the youth sides, he was an assistant at both reserve and main squads. In 2001, he returned to Girona, being named director of football.

On 6 June 2003, however, Julià was named manager of the Albirrojos, with the side in Tercera División play-offs. After achieving promotion, he returned to his previous role.

In the 2004 summer Julià was appointed Víctor Fernández's assistant at F.C. Porto, and remained with the manager in his subsequent spell at Zaragoza. On 26 October 2009 he returned to Girona, taking over for sacked Cristóbal.

After narrowly avoiding relegation, Julià left the club and joined FC Barcelona's backroom staff.

== Honours ==
- Copa del Rey: 1985–86
