= José Aurelio Gay =

Spanish footballer & manager (born 1965)

Personal information
- Full name: José Aurelio Gay López
- Date of birth: 10 December 1965 (age 60)
- Place of birth: Madrid, Spain
- Height: 1.80 m (5 ft 11 in)
- Position: Midfielder

Youth career
- Real Madrid

Senior career*
Years	Team	Apps	(Gls)
1984–1988	Real Madrid B	109	(14)
1988–1991	Español	80	(12)
1991–1996	Zaragoza	114	(20)
1996–1997	Oviedo	13	(0)
1997–1999	Toledo	30	(2)
Total		346	(48)

International career
1983	Spain U18	1	(0)
1985	Spain U19	1	(0)
1985	Spain U20	6	(0)
1985	Spain U21	2	(1)

Managerial career
- 2001: Toledo
- 2001–2002: Real Madrid C
- 2002–2005: Pontevedra
- 2005–2006: Jaén
- 2006: Lorca Deportiva
- 2008: Fuenlabrada
- 2009: Pontevedra
- 2009: Zaragoza B
- 2009–2010: Zaragoza
- 2012–2013: Racing Santander
- 2013–2015: Real Madrid C
- 2016: Palencia
- 2019–2021: Espanyol B
- 2023: Vaca Díez
- 2023: Guabirá
- * Club domestic league appearances and goals

José Aurelio Gay López (born 10 December 1965) is a Spanish retired footballer who played as a midfielder, currently a manager.

He was associated with Zaragoza throughout his career, serving the club as both a player and manager. He amassed La Liga totals of 180 matches and 27 goals over eight seasons, starting out at Castilla.

After starting working in that capacity in 2001, Gay went on to coach a host of clubs in the Segunda División and Segunda División B.

== Playing career ==
Born in Madrid, Gay began playing football with Real Madrid, eventually progressing to the reserves, Castilla CF. While at the club he was a member of the Spain under-20 side that finished runners-up at the 1985 FIFA World Youth Championship, starting in five of six games and appearing as a substitute in the other.

After four seasons in the Segunda División, Gay moved up to La Liga with RCD Español in summer 1988. He scored twice in 17 matches in his debut season, in which the Catalans were relegated, but eventually established himself in the starting XI, spending one season in the second tier and another in the first; in 1990–91, his last year, he was the team's second-highest league scorer with five goals – only behind German Wolfram Wuttke – as he helped them to narrowly retain their top-flight status.

Gay signed for Real Zaragoza on 4 July 1991. In consecutive seasons he helped the Aragonese to the 1994 Copa del Rey and the following year's UEFA Cup Winners' Cup, although he was seriously injured during the latter campaign. He featured sparingly afterwards, and left the club in June 1996.

Gay's final three seasons were spent at Real Oviedo and CD Toledo, totalling only 43 league appearances for both clubs and retiring in 1999 at age 33.

== Coaching career ==
After his retirement, Gay managed numerous teams in both the second division and the Segunda División B, starting at his last club Toledo. Real Madrid C, Pontevedra CF, Real Jaén, Lorca Deportiva CF, CF Fuenlabrada and Deportivo Aragón followed; he took the reins of the latter's first team following the dismissal of Marcelino García Toral on 12 December 2009.

Gay's first game in charge of Zaragoza saw them lose 6–0 away against Real Madrid, a result that led to rumours that he would be replaced by Víctor Muñoz; the reports, however, proved to be unfounded and he was offered the job until June 2010. After bringing in several new players in the January transfer window, the side's fortunes began to turn as he led them out of the relegation zone by mid-February, eventually finishing in 14th position with 41 points.

In mid-November 2010, with Zaragoza ranking last in the league (eventually managing to avoid relegation), Gay was sacked. On 12 December 2012, after more than two years out of work, he replaced the fired Fabri at the helm of Racing de Santander, lasting until March in a season that saw the Cantabrians relegated to the third division.

Gay returned to Real Madrid C in November 2013. He led the team to a top-half finish, but they were relegated to Tercera División due to the fate of Castilla and disbanded in 2015.

In August 2016, Gay ran training sessions for CD Palencia Balompié but did not manage the club in an official match. He signed a one-year deal with the option of a second at third-tier RCD Espanyol B in June 2019.

Gay later worked in the Bolivian Primera División, with C.D. Vaca Díez (resigning shortly after being appointed due to his father's ill health) and Club Deportivo Guabirá.

== Managerial statistics ==
As of match played 22 December 2019

Managerial record by team and tenure
Team	Nat	From	To	Record					Ref.
Team	Nat	From	To	G	W	D	L	Win %	Ref.
Toledo	(Spain)	12 February 2001	26 June 2001	19	11	6	2	57.89	
Real Madrid C	(Spain)	26 June 2001	22 May 2002	40	16	8	16	40.00	
Pontevedra	(Spain)	23 September 2002	24 January 2005	110	47	29	34	42.73	
Jaén	(Spain)	21 November 2005	30 May 2006	25	10	6	9	40.00	
Lorca Deportiva	(Spain)	29 June 2006	18 December 2006	18	4	6	8	22.22	
Fuenlabrada	(Spain)	14 January 2008	19 May 2008	18	3	8	7	16.67	
Pontevedra	(Spain)	9 February 2009	12 May 2009	14	6	1	7	42.86	
Zaragoza B	(Spain)	1 July 2009	13 December 2009	15	13	1	1	86.67	
Zaragoza	(Spain)	13 December 2009	18 November 2010	37	9	12	16	24.32	
Racing Santander	(Spain)	12 December 2012	5 March 2013	11	4	1	6	36.36	
Real Madrid C	(Spain)	20 November 2013	29 May 2015	62	27	12	23	43.55	
Palencia	(Spain)	4 August 2016	10 August 2016	0	0	0	0	—	
Espanyol B	(Spain)	8 June 2019	Present	20	10	6	4	50.00	
Total				389	160	96	133	41.13	—

== Honours ==
=== Player ===
Zaragoza

- Copa del Rey: 1993–94

Spain U20

- FIFA U-20 World Cup runner-up: 1985

=== Manager ===
Pontevedra

- Segunda División B: 2003–04
