= Andoni Cedrún =

Spanish footballer (born 1960)

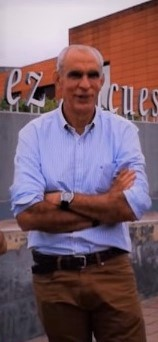
- Cedrún in 2019

Personal information
- Full name: Andoni Cedrún Ibarra
- Date of birth: 5 June 1960 (age 66)
- Place of birth: Durango, Spain
- Height: 1.98 m (6 ft 6 in)
- Position: Goalkeeper

Youth career
- Athletic Bilbao

Senior career*
Years	Team	Apps	(Gls)
1978–1980	Bilbao Athletic	50	(0)
1980–1983	Athletic Bilbao	21	(0)
1984	Cádiz	15	(0)
1984–1996	Zaragoza	301	(0)
1996–1997	Logroñés	14	(0)
Total		401	(0)

International career
1980	Spain U20	1	(0)
1981	Spain U21	1	(0)
1994–1996	Basque Country	3	(0)
- * Club domestic league appearances and goals

Andoni Cedrún Ibarra (born 5 June 1960) is a Spanish former professional footballer who played as a goalkeeper.

He appeared in 351 La Liga matches over 15 seasons, representing mostly Zaragoza with which he won three major titles, including the 1995 Cup Winners' Cup. He started his career with Athletic Bilbao.

== Club career ==
Born in Durango, Biscay, Cedrún was a youth product at Athletic Bilbao, and managed to appear in 21 first-team matches in his first professional season at only 20. This was prior to the promotion of another Lezama graduate, Andoni Zubizarreta, which then left him two years without any La Liga appearances.

Cedrún joined Real Zaragoza of the same league in summer 1984, following half a season at Cádiz CF (15 games, top-flight relegation). He proceeded to play 144 times in the league in his first four years, adding five matches in the team's victorious campaign in the UEFA Cup Winners' Cup in 1994–95.

For the 1988–89 campaign, the Aragonese signed Paraguayan José Luis Chilavert and Cedrún would be again second-choice for two seasons. However, he managed to bounce back at age 30, going on to start again the following three.

From 1993 onwards, Cedrún began facing some competition from Real Madrid youth graduate Juanmi and, after no league appearances to his credit in 1995–96, left for a single top-tier campaign at lowly CD Logroñés, retiring subsequently.

== Personal life ==
Cedrún's father, Carmelo, was also a footballer and a goalkeeper. He too represented Athletic but with more success, playing more than 400 competitive matches in the 50s/60s.

His nephew, Markel Areitio, is also a goalkeeper.

== Honours ==
Zaragoza

- Copa del Rey: 1985–86, 1993–94
- UEFA Cup Winners' Cup: 1994–95
