= 1994–95 UEFA Cup Winners' Cup =

Tournament details
- Dates: 11 August 1994 – 10 May 1995
- Teams: 44

Final positions
- Champions: (Spain) Zaragoza (1st title)
- Runners-up: (England) Arsenal

Tournament statistics
- Matches played: 85
- Goals scored: 261 (3.07 per match)
- Attendance: 1,196,492 (14,076 per match)
- Top scorer(s): Ian Wright (Arsenal); 9 goals

The 1994–95 season of the UEFA Cup Winners' Cup was won by Zaragoza in the final against defending champions Arsenal, the Spanish club winning thanks to a last-minute goal from midfielder Nayim with a shot from 40 yards. Moldova joined the competition for the first time. It was the first season under a new name as the tournament used to be known as the European Cup Winners' Cup.

== Qualifying round ==
Location of teams competing in the 1994–95 UEFA Cup Winners' Cup first round.
Yellow: Did not qualify from qualifying round; Red: Qualified for first round.

Team 1	Agg.	Team 2	1st leg	2nd leg
Bangor (Northern Ireland)	0–5	(Slovakia) Tatran Prešov	0–1	0–4
Barry Town (Wales)	0–7	(Lithuania) Žalgiris Vilnius	0–1	0–6
Bodø/Glimt (Norway)	6–0	(Latvia) Olimpija Rīga	6–0	0–0
Fandok Bobruisk (Belarus)	4–4 (a)	(Albania) SK Tirana	4–1	0–3
Ferencváros (Hungary)	12–2	(Luxembourg) F91 Dudelange	6–1	6–1
Floriana (Malta)	2–3	(Republic of Ireland) Sligo Rovers	2–2	0–1
Keflavík (Iceland)	2–6	(Israel) Maccabi Tel Aviv	1–2	1–4
Norma Tallinn (Estonia)	1–14	(Slovenia) Maribor	1–4	0–10
Pirin Blagoevgrad (Bulgaria)	4–0	(Liechtenstein) Schaan	3–0	1–0
B71 Sandoy (Faroe Islands)	0–7	(Finland) HJK	0–5	0–2
Tiligul Tiraspol (Moldova)	1–4	(Cyprus) Omonia	0–1	1–3
Viktoria Žižkov (Czech Republic)	4–3	(Sweden) IFK Norrköping	1–0	3–3

=== First leg ===
11 August 1994
18:30

Bangor (Northern Ireland)	0–1	(Slovakia) Tatran Prešov
	Report	Nenadić 71'

Clandeboye Park, Bangor
Attendance: 1,050
Referee: Gylfi Orrason (Iceland)

11 August 1994
19:30

Barry Town (Wales)	0–1	(Lithuania) Žalgiris Vilnius
	Report	Vencevičius 77'

Ninian Park, Cardiff
Attendance: 1,914
Referee: Roy Helge Olsen (Norway)

11 August 1994
18:00

Bodø/Glimt (Norway)	6–0	(Latvia) Olimpija Rīga
Berstad 6'; R. Berg 53', 89'; Bjørkan 70'; Johnsen 72', 82'	Report

Aspmyra Stadion, Bodø
Attendance: 2,290
Referee: Sten Johanzon (Sweden)

11 August 1994
19:00

Fandok Bobruisk (Belarus)	4–1	(Albania) SK Tirana
Yaromka 1', 5'; Khrypach 65'; Savostsikaw 72'	Report	Prenga 89'

Dinamo Stadium, Minsk
Attendance: 5,500
Referee: Nikolai Levnikov (Russia)

11 August 1994
19:30

Ferencváros (Hungary)	6–1	(Luxembourg) F91 Dudelange
Neagoe 2'; Szekeres 17', 75'; Páling 44'; Lipcsei 55'; Albert 76'	Report	Fanelli 82'

Üllői úti stadion, Budapest
Attendance: 13,825
Referee: Adrian Geamăn Moroianu (Romania)

11 August 1994
19:00

Floriana (Malta)	2–2	(Republic of Ireland) Sligo Rovers
Stefanović 52', 89'	Report	Moran 12'; M. Reid 31'

National Stadium, Ta' Qali
Attendance: 2,030
Referee: Celino Gracia Redondo (Spain)

11 August 1994
19:00

Keflavík (Iceland)	1–2	(Israel) Maccabi Tel Aviv
Tanasić 74'	Report	Klinger 38'; Nimni 82'

Keflavíkurvöllur, Keflavík
Attendance: 844
Referee: Richard O'Hanlon (Republic of Ireland)

11 August 1994
18:00

Norma Tallinn (Estonia)	1–4	(Slovenia) Maribor
Rõtškov 82'	Report	Galič 51'; Milevski 62'; Ǵurovski 69'; Šimundža 90'

Kadrioru staadion, Tallinn
Attendance: 1,000
Referee: Mika Peltola (Finland)

11 August 1994
18:00

Pirin Blagoevgrad (Bulgaria)	3–0	(Liechtenstein) Schaan
Orachev 18'; Yanev 29'; Petrov 59'	Report

Vasil Levski National Stadium, Sofia
Attendance: 1,744
Referee: Andreas Georgiou (Cyprus)

11 August 1994
19:00

B71 Sandoy (Faroe Islands)	0–5	(Finland) HJK
	Report	Vanhala 4', 85'; Lius 20', 68'; Heinola 81'

Inni í Dal, Sandur
Attendance: 462
Referee: Dermot Gallagher (England)

11 August 1994
19:00

Tiligul Tiraspol (Moldova)	0–1	(Cyprus) Omonia
	Report	Gogrichiani 16'

Stadionul Republican, Chișinău
Attendance: 4,000
Referee: Günter Benkö (Austria)

11 August 1994
16:30

Viktoria Žižkov (Czech Republic)	1–0	(Sweden) IFK Norrköping
Poborský 73'	Report

Stadion FK Viktoria Žižkov, Prague
Attendance: 1,905
Referee: László Vágner (Hungary)

=== Second leg ===
24 August 1994
18:00

Schaan (Liechtenstein)	0–1	(Bulgaria) Pirin Blagoevgrad
	Report	Yanev 2'

Sportanlage Rheinwiese, Schaan
Attendance: 1,150
Referee: Štefan Tivold (Slovenia)

Pirin Blagoevgrad won 4–0 on aggregate.

24 August 1994
18:00

HJK (Finland)	2–0	(Faroe Islands) B71 Sandoy
Kottila 1'; Suokonautio 80'	Report

Tapiolan urheilupuisto, Espoo
Attendance: 1,257
Referee: Algirdas Dubinskas (Lithuania)

HJK won 7–0 on aggregate.

25 August 1994
17:00

Tatran Prešov (Slovakia)	4–0	(Northern Ireland) Bangor
Kociš 13', 48'; Matta 40'; Höger 56'	Report

Štadión Tatran, Prešov
Attendance: 4,972
Referee: Mateo Beusan (Croatia)

Tatran Prešov won 5–0 on aggregate.

25 August 1994
18:30

Žalgiris Vilnius (Lithuania)	6–0	(Wales) Barry Town
Karvelis 17', 49'; Baltušnikas 39'; Poderis 48'; Maciulevičius 65'; Jankauskas 86'	Report

Žalgiris Stadium, Vilnius
Attendance: 2,900
Referee: Dick Jol (Netherlands)

Žalgiris Vilnius won 7–0 on aggregate.

25 August 1994
18:00

Olimpija Rīga (Latvia)	0–0	(Norway) Bodø/Glimt
	Report

Latvijas Universitātes stadions, Riga
Attendance: 500
Referee: Finn Lambek (Denmark)

Bodø/Glimt won 6–0 on aggregate.

25 August 1994
16:30

SK Tirana (Albania)	3–0	(Belarus) Fandok Bobruisk
Fortuzi 46', 77', 90'	Report

Qemal Stafa Stadium, Tirana
Attendance: 1,500
Referee: Hermann Albrecht (Germany)

4–4 on aggregate. SK Tirana won on away goals.

25 August 1994
18:30

F91 Dudelange (Luxembourg)	1–6	(Hungary) Ferencváros
Morgante 20'	Report	Lisztes 6'; Páling 17'; Lipcsei 38', 68'; Christiansen 55'; Zavadszky 88'

Stade Jos Nosbaum, Dudelange
Attendance: 1,162
Referee: Marc Batta (France)

Ferencváros won 12–2 on aggregate.

25 August 1994
19:30

Sligo Rovers (Republic of Ireland)	1–0	(Malta) Floriana
Brennan 70'	Report

Showgrounds, Sligo
Attendance: 3,058
Referee: António Almeida Marçal (Portugal)

Sligo Rovers won 3–2 on aggregate.

25 August 1994
19:00

Maccabi Tel Aviv (Israel)	4–1	(Iceland) Keflavík
Shoham 14'; G. Brumer 17'; Klinger 24'; Driks 69'	Report	Tanasić 38'

Ramat Gan Stadium, Ramat Gan
Attendance: 8,125
Referee: Roger Philippi (Luxembourg)

Maccabi Tel Aviv won 6–2 on aggregate.

25 August 1994
20:15

Maribor (Slovenia)	10–0	(Estonia) Norma Tallinn
Gjurovski 5', 9'; Gutalj 20', 45'; Bozgo 22', 24' (pen.), 42', 82'; Šimundža 39', 84'	Report

Ljudski vrt, Maribor
Attendance: 4,500
Referee: Ladislav Gádoši (Slovakia)

Maribor won 14–1 on aggregate.

25 August 1994
20:00

Omonia (Cyprus)	3–1	(Moldova) Tiligul Tiraspol
Andreou 6'; Tutić 45'; Savvidis 89'	Report	Belous 50'

Makario Stadium, Nicosia
Attendance: 12,500
Referee: Haim Lipkovitz (Israel)

Omonia won 4–1 on aggregate.

25 August 1994
19:00

IFK Norrköping (Sweden)	3–3	(Czech Republic) Viktoria Žižkov
Hansson 40', 70'; Vaattovaara 89' (pen.)	Report	Trval 52'; Kordule 58'; Vrabec 87' (pen.)

Idrottsparken, Norrköping
Attendance: 3,060
Referee: Zbigniew Przesmycki (Poland)

Viktoria Žižkov won 4–3 on aggregate.

== First round ==
For the 1994–95 season, England had two representatives in the tournament, neither of which was the domestic cup winners. The first was Arsenal, who were the Cup Winners' Cup holders, and the second was Chelsea, who had lost the 1994 FA Cup final to double winners Manchester United. Both teams were eliminated from competition by eventual winners Zaragoza of Spain.

Team 1	Agg.	Team 2	1st leg	2nd leg
Žalgiris Vilnius (Lithuania)	2–3	(Netherlands) Feyenoord	1–1	1–2
Maccabi Tel Aviv (Israel)	0–2	(Germany) Werder Bremen	0–0	0–2
Dundee United (Scotland)	4–5	(Slovakia) Tatran Prešov	3–2	1–3
Gloria Bistrița (Romania)	2–5	(Spain) Zaragoza	2–1	0–4
Sligo Rovers (Republic of Ireland)	2–5	(Belgium) Club Brugge	1–2	1–3
Pirin Blagoevgrad (Bulgaria)	1–8	(Greece) Panathinaikos	0–2	1–6
Chelsea (England)	4–2	(Czech Republic) Viktoria Žižkov	4–2	0–0
Maribor (Slovenia)	1–4	Austria Wien	1–1	0–3
Brøndby (Denmark)	4–0	(Albania) SK Tirana	3–0	1–0
Omonia (Cyprus)	1–6	(England) Arsenal	1–3	0–3
Beşiktaş (Turkey)	3–1	(Finland) HJK	2–0	1–1
Croatia Zagreb	3–4	(France) Auxerre	3–1	0–3
Bodø/Glimt (Norway)	3–4	(Italy) Sampdoria	3–2	0–2
Grasshopper (Switzerland)	3–1	(Ukraine) Chornomorets Odesa	3–0	0–1
Porto (Portugal)	3–0	(Poland) ŁKS Łódź	2–0	1–0
CSKA Moscow (Russia)	3–3 (6–7 p)	(Hungary) Ferencváros	2–1	1–2 (aet)

=== First leg ===
13 September 1994
16:00

Maccabi Tel Aviv (Israel)	0–0	(Germany) Werder Bremen
	Report

Ramat Gan Stadium, Ramat Gan
Attendance: 10,000
Referee: Daniel Roduit (Switzerland)

15 September 1994
19:00

Žalgiris Vilnius (Lithuania)	1–1	(Netherlands) Feyenoord
Tereškinas 87' (pen.)	Report	Larsson 9'

Žalgiris Stadium, Vilnius
Attendance: 9,000
Referee: Roy Helge Olsen (Norway)

15 September 1994
19:30

Dundee United (Scotland)	3–2	(Slovakia) Tatran Prešov
Petrić 16'; Nixon 66'; Hannah 70'	Report	Skalka 10'; Zvara 41' (pen.)

Tannadice Park, Dundee
Attendance: 9,454
Referee: Léon Schelings (Belgium)

15 September 1994
16:30

Gloria Bistrița (Romania)	2–1	(Spain) Zaragoza
Răduță 51'; Lungu 52'	Report	Esnáider 44'

Stadionul Municipal Gloria, Bistrița
Attendance: 7,000
Referee: Ahmet Çakar (Turkey)

15 September 1994
19:30

Sligo Rovers (Republic of Ireland)	1–2	(Belgium) Club Brugge
Kenny 44'	Report	Vermant 10'; G. Verheyen 62'

Showgrounds, Sligo
Attendance: 5,000
Referee: Robert Sedlacek (Austria)

15 September 1994
17:00

Pirin Blagoevgrad (Bulgaria)	0–2	(Greece) Panathinaikos
	Report	Nioplias 70'; Alexoudis 84'

Stadion Hristo Botev, Blagoevgrad
Attendance: 11,972
Referee: Yuri Chebotarev (Russia)

15 September 1994
19:45

Chelsea (England)	4–2	(Czech Republic) Viktoria Žižkov
Furlong 3'; Sinclair 4'; Rocastle 53'; Wise 68'	Report	Majoroš 35', 42'

Stamford Bridge, London
Attendance: 22,036
Referee: Christer Fällström (Sweden)

15 September 1994
18:00

Maribor (Slovenia)	1–1	Austria Wien
Bozgo 46' (pen.)	Report	Prosenik 23'

Ljudski vrt, Maribor
Attendance: 7,100
Referee: Syarhey Shmolik (Belarus)

15 September 1994
19:00

Brøndby (Denmark)	3–0	(Albania) SK Tirana
B. Jensen 20' (pen.); B. Hansen 57'; Malko 66' (o.g.)	Report

Brøndby Stadion, Brøndbyvester
Attendance: 6,035
Referee: Gylfi Orrason (Iceland)

15 September 1994
20:00

Omonia (Cyprus)	1–3	(England) Arsenal
Malekkos 73'	Report	Merson 37', 80'; Wright 49'

Makario Stadium, Nicosia
Attendance: 13,954
Referee: António Almeida Marçal (Portugal)

15 September 1994
20:00

Beşiktaş (Turkey)	2–0	(Finland) HJK
Oktay 27'; Ertuğrul 35' (pen.)	Report

BJK İnönü Stadium, Istanbul
Attendance: 23,256
Referee: Keith Burge (Wales)

15 September 1994
18:00

Croatia Zagreb	3–1	(France) Auxerre
Jeličić 1'; Soldo 40'; Pamić 65'	Report	Diomède 20'

Stadion Maksimir, Zagreb
Attendance: 20,000
Referee: Marcello Nicchi (Italy)

15 September 1994
20:30

Bodø/Glimt (Norway)	3–2	(Italy) Sampdoria
Staurvik 2'; Johnsen 32', 58'	Report	Bertarelli 47'; Platt 67'

Ullevaal Stadion, Oslo
Attendance: 2,015
Referee: Stephen Lodge (England)

15 September 1994
20:00

Grasshopper (Switzerland)	3–0	(Ukraine) Chornomorets Odesa
Bickel 41'; Koller 52'; Subiat 85'	Report

Hardturm, Zürich
Attendance: 3,600
Referee: Jiří Ulrich (Czech Republic)

15 September 1994
21:30

Porto (Portugal)	2–0	(Poland) ŁKS Łódź
Domingos 71'; Rui Barros 76'	Report

Estádio das Antas, Porto
Attendance: 17,000
Referee: Sándor Piller (Hungary)

15 September 1994
19:00

CSKA Moscow (Russia)	2–1	(Hungary) Ferencváros
Mamchur 50'; Sergeyev 74'	Report	Christiansen 60'

Central Dynamo Stadium, Moscow
Attendance: 6,000
Referee: Veselin Bogdanov (Bulgaria)

=== Second leg ===
29 September 1994
20:00

Feyenoord (Netherlands)	2–1	(Lithuania) Žalgiris Vilnius
Larsson 54'; Heus 65' (pen.)	Report	Vencevičius 89'

De Kuip, Rotterdam
Attendance: 18,428
Referee: István Vad (Hungary)

Feyenoord won 3–2 on aggregate.

29 September 1994
20:15

Werder Bremen (Germany)	2–0	(Israel) Maccabi Tel Aviv
Bode 55'; Basler 75'	Report

Weserstadion, Bremen
Attendance: 22,431
Referee: Juha Hirviniemi (Finland)

Werder Bremen won 2–0 on aggregate.

29 September 1994
17:00

Tatran Prešov (Slovakia)	3–1	(Scotland) Dundee United
Zvara 11', 77'; Kociš 20'	Report	Nixon 3'

Štadión Tatran, Prešov
Attendance: 8,184
Referee: Serdar Çakman (Turkey)

Tatran Prešov won 5–4 on aggregate.

29 September 1994
20:30

Zaragoza (Spain)	4–0	(Romania) Gloria Bistrița
Pardeza 12'; Aguado 42'; Poyet 49', 57'	Report

Mestalla, Valencia
Attendance: 4,500
Referee: Andrew Waddell (Scotland)

Zaragoza won 5–2 on aggregate.

29 September 1994
20:30

Club Brugge (Belgium)	3–1	(Republic of Ireland) Sligo Rovers
Staelens 3', 45' (pen.); Eijkelkamp 60'	Report	Rooney 8'

Olympiastadion, Bruges
Attendance: 6,281
Referee: Lars Gerner (Denmark)

Club Brugge won 5–2 on aggregate.

29 September 1994
20:00

Panathinaikos (Greece)	6–1	(Bulgaria) Pirin Blagoevgrad
Alexoudis 7', 17'; Warzycha 30', 87', 90'; Borrelli 65'	Report	Orachev 44'

O.A.K.A., Athens
Attendance: 22,230
Referee: Svend Erik Christensen (Denmark)

Panathinaikos won 8–1 on aggregate.

29 September 1994
15:00

Viktoria Žižkov (Czech Republic)	0–0	(England) Chelsea
	Report

Stadion Střelnice, Jablonec nad Nisou
Attendance: 5,176
Referee: Gianni Beschin (Italy)

Chelsea won 4–2 on aggregate.

29 September 1994
19:30

Austria Wien	3–0	(Slovenia) Maribor
Flögel 18'; Kubica 53', 56'	Report

Ernst-Happel-Stadion, Vienna
Attendance: 5,014
Referee: Loizos Loizou (Cyprus)

Austria Wien won 4–1 on aggregate.

29 September 1994
15:30

SK Tirana (Albania)	0–1	(Denmark) Brøndby
	Report	Strudal 29'

Qemal Stafa Stadium, Tirana
Attendance: 4,650
Referee: Marc Batta (France)

Brøndby won 4–0 on aggregate.

29 September 1994
20:00

Arsenal (England)	3–0	(Cyprus) Omonia
Wright 9', 70'; Schwarz 31'	Report

Highbury, London
Attendance: 24,165
Referee: Juan Ansuátegui Roca (Spain)

Arsenal won 6–1 on aggregate.

29 September 1994
18:00

HJK (Finland)	1–1	(Turkey) Beşiktaş
Rantanen 68'	Report	Oktay 88'

Olympiastadion, Helsinki
Attendance: 2,390
Referee: Hugh Dallas (Scotland)

Beşiktaş won 3–1 on aggregate.

29 September 1994
20:00

Auxerre (France)	3–0	Croatia Zagreb
Diomède 41'; Mahé 75'; Lamouchi 89'	Report

Stade de l'Abbé-Deschamps, Auxerre
Attendance: 13,874
Referee: Roelof Luinge (Netherlands)

Auxerre won 4–3 on aggregate.

29 September 1994
20:30

Sampdoria (Italy)	2–0	(Norway) Bodø/Glimt
Platt 13'; Lombardo 37'	Report

Stadio Luigi Ferraris, Genoa
Attendance: 28,656
Referee: Vladimír Hriňák (Slovakia)

Sampdoria won 4–3 on aggregate.

29 September 1994
19:00

Chornomorets Odesa (Ukraine)	1–0	(Switzerland) Grasshopper
Huseynov 10'	Report

Central Stadium Chornomorets, Odesa
Attendance: 5,913
Referee: Hermann Albrecht (Germany)

Grasshopper won 3–1 on aggregate.

29 September 1994
18:00

ŁKS Łódź (Poland)	0–1	(Portugal) Porto
	Report	Drulović 44'

Stadion Miejski ŁKS, Łódź
Attendance: 6,113
Referee: Martin Bodenham (England)

Porto won 3–0 on aggregate.

29 September 1994
19:00

Ferencváros (Hungary)	2–1 (a.e.t.)	(Russia) CSKA Moscow
Lipcsei 36'; Neagoe 44'	Report	Radimov 15'
Penalties
Gregor (penalty scored); Lisztes (penalty scored); Christiansen (penalty scored); Szekeres (penalty scored); Lipcsei (penalty scored); Zavadszky (penalty scored); Hrutka (penalty scored)	7–6	(penalty scored) Bystrov; (penalty scored) Bushmanov; (penalty scored) Demchenko; (penalty scored) Mamchur; (penalty scored) Minko; (penalty scored) Broshin; (penalty missed) Kolotovkin

Üllői úti stadion, Budapest
Attendance: 15,702
Referee: Wieland Ziller (Germany)

3–3 on aggregate. Ferencváros won 7–6 on penalties.

== Second round ==
Team 1	Agg.	Team 2	1st leg	2nd leg
Feyenoord (Netherlands)	5–3	(Germany) Werder Bremen	1–0	4–3
Tatran Prešov (Slovakia)	1–6	(Spain) Zaragoza	0–4	1–2
Club Brugge (Belgium)	1–0	(Greece) Panathinaikos	1–0	0–0
Chelsea (England)	1–1 (a)	Austria Wien	0–0	1–1
Brøndby (Denmark)	3–4	(England) Arsenal	1–2	2–2
Beşiktaş (Turkey)	2–4	(France) Auxerre	2–2	0–2
Sampdoria (Italy)	5–3	(Switzerland) Grasshopper	3–0	2–3
Porto (Portugal)	6–2	(Hungary) Ferencváros	6–0	0–2

=== First leg ===
20 October 1994
20:00

Feyenoord (Netherlands)	1–0	(Germany) Werder Bremen
Larsson 57'	Report

De Kuip, Rotterdam
Attendance: 35,624
Referee: Bo Karlsson (Sweden)

20 October 1994
20:15

Tatran Prešov (Slovakia)	0–4	(Spain) Zaragoza
	Report	Poyet 26'; Varga 43' (o.g.); Esnáider 50', 88'

Štadión Tatran, Prešov
Attendance: 12,105
Referee: José Pratas (Portugal)

20 October 1994
20:30

Club Brugge (Belgium)	1–0	(Greece) Panathinaikos
Staelens 5' (pen.)	Report

Olympiastadion, Bruges
Attendance: 14,760
Referee: Marc Batta (France)

20 October 1994
20:00

Chelsea (England)	0–0	Austria Wien
	Report

Stamford Bridge, London
Attendance: 22,560
Referee: Atanas Uzunov (Bulgaria)

20 October 1994
20:00

Brøndby (Denmark)	1–2	(England) Arsenal
Strudal 53'	Report	Wright 16'; Smith 18'

Brøndby Stadion, Brøndbyvester
Attendance: 13,406
Referee: Werner Müller (Switzerland)

20 October 1994
19:00

Beşiktaş (Turkey)	2–2	(France) Auxerre
Mehmet 40'; Ertuğrul 43'	Report	Saïb 54'; Martins 59'

BJK İnönü Stadium, Istanbul
Attendance: 20,936
Referee: Peter Mikkelsen (Denmark)

20 October 1994
20:30

Sampdoria (Italy)	3–0	(Switzerland) Grasshopper
Melli 45'; Mihajlović 76'; Maspero 83'	Report

Stadio Luigi Ferraris, Genoa
Attendance: 25,316
Referee: Ryszard Wójcik (Poland)

20 October 1994
21:30

Porto (Portugal)	6–0	(Hungary) Ferencváros
Jorge Costa 14'; Rui Barros 15'; Drulović 40', 58'; Domingos 85'; Aloísio 87'	Report

Estádio das Antas, Porto
Attendance: 15,880
Referee: Marnix Sandra (Belgium)

=== Second leg ===
3 November 1994
20:00

Werder Bremen (Germany)	3–4	(Netherlands) Feyenoord
Beschastnykh 12', 60'; Basler 90'	Report	Larsson 21', 34', 67' (pen.); Heus 55' (pen.)

Weserstadion, Bremen
Attendance: 31,118
Referee: Pierluigi Pairetto (Italy)

Feyenoord won 5–3 on aggregate.

3 November 1994
20:30

Zaragoza (Spain)	2–1	(Slovakia) Tatran Prešov
Esnáider 6'; Óscar 56'	Report	Kočiš 38'

Mestalla, Valencia
Attendance: 2,500
Referee: Dermot Gallagher (England)

Zaragoza won 6–1 on aggregate.

3 November 1994
21:30

Panathinaikos (Greece)	0–0	(Belgium) Club Brugge
	Report

O.A.K.A., Athens
Attendance: 67,133
Referee: Bernd Heynemann (Germany)

Club Brugge won 1–0 on aggregate.

3 November 1994
19:35

Austria Wien	1–1	(England) Chelsea
Narbekovas 73'	Report	Spencer 40'

Ernst-Happel-Stadion, Vienna
Attendance: 18,000
Referee: Frans Van Den Wijngaert (Belgium)

1–1 on aggregate. Chelsea won on away goals.

3 November 1994
20:00

Arsenal (England)	2–2	(Denmark) Brøndby
Wright 25' (pen.); Selley 46'	Report	B. Hansen 2'; Eggen 69'

Highbury, London
Attendance: 32,290
Referee: Sergei Khusainov (Russia)

Arsenal won 4–3 on aggregate.

3 November 1994
20:30

Auxerre (France)	2–0	(Turkey) Beşiktaş
Lamouchi 45', 49'	Report

Stade de l'Abbé-Deschamps, Auxerre
Attendance: 21,140
Referee: Manuel Díaz Vega (Spain)

Auxerre won 4–2 on aggregate.

3 November 1994
20:30

Grasshopper (Switzerland)	3–2	(Italy) Sampdoria
Willems 13'; Bickel 52'; Koller 55'	Report	Melli 17'; Lombardo 40'

Hardturm, Zürich
Attendance: 12,100
Referee: John Blankenstein (Netherlands)

Sampdoria won 5–3 on aggregate.

3 November 1994
19:00

Ferencváros (Hungary)	2–0	(Portugal) Porto
Zavadszky 27'; Neagoe 60'	Report

Üllői úti stadion, Budapest
Attendance: 9,385
Referee: Alfredo Trentalange (Italy)

Porto won 6–2 on aggregate.

== Quarter-finals ==
Team 1	Agg.	Team 2	1st leg	2nd leg
Feyenoord (Netherlands)	1–2	(Spain) Zaragoza	1–0	0–2
Club Brugge (Belgium)	1–2	(England) Chelsea	1–0	0–2
Arsenal (England)	2–1	(France) Auxerre	1–1	1–0
Sampdoria (Italy)	1–1 (5–3 p)	(Portugal) Porto	0–1	1–0 (aet)

=== First leg ===
28 February 1995
20:30

Club Brugge (Belgium)	1–0	(England) Chelsea
Gert Verheyen 82'	Report

Olympiastadion, Bruges
Attendance: 16,145
Referee: Serge Muhmenthaler (Switzerland)

2 March 1995
20:00

Feyenoord (Netherlands)	1–0	(Spain) Zaragoza
Larsson 61'	Report

De Kuip, Rotterdam
Attendance: 41,920
Referee: Ilkka Koho (Finland)

2 March 1995
20:00

Arsenal (England)	1–1	(France) Auxerre
Wright 59' (pen.)	Report	Verlaat 63'

Highbury, London
Attendance: 35,208
Referee: Leif Sundell (Sweden)

2 March 1995
20:45

Sampdoria (Italy)	0–1	(Portugal) Porto
	Report	Yuran 64'

Stadio Luigi Ferraris, Genoa
Attendance: 21,004
Referee: David Elleray (England)

=== Second leg ===
16 March 1995
20:30

Zaragoza (Spain)	2–0	(Netherlands) Feyenoord
Pardeza 58'; Esnáider 71'	Report

La Romareda, Zaragoza
Attendance: 25,000
Referee: Markus Merk (Germany)

Zaragoza won 2–1 on aggregate.

14 March 1995
20:05

Chelsea (England)	2–0	(Belgium) Club Brugge
Stein 16'; Furlong 38'	Report

Stamford Bridge, London
Attendance: 28,661
Referee: Pierluigi Pairetto (Italy)

Chelsea won 2–1 on aggregate.

16 March 1995
21:00

Auxerre (France)	0–1	(England) Arsenal
	Report	Wright 16'

Stade de l'Abbé-Deschamps, Auxerre
Attendance: 21,226
Referee: Vadim Zhuk (Belarus)

Arsenal won 2–1 on aggregate.

16 March 1995
21:30

Porto (Portugal)	0–1 (a.e.t.)	(Italy) Sampdoria
	Report	Mancini 50'
Penalties
Emerson (penalty scored); Latapy (penalty missed); Domingos (penalty scored); Folha (penalty scored)	3–5	(penalty scored) Mihajlović; (penalty scored) Jugović; (penalty scored) Maspero; (penalty scored) Salsano; (penalty scored) Lombardo

Estádio das Antas, Porto
Attendance: 35,076
Referee: Marc Batta (France)

1–1 on aggregate. Sampdoria won 5–3 on penalties.

== Semi-finals ==
Team 1	Agg.	Team 2	1st leg	2nd leg
Zaragoza (Spain)	4–3	(England) Chelsea	3–0	1–3
Arsenal (England)	5–5 (3–2 p)	(Italy) Sampdoria	3–2	2–3 (aet)

=== First leg ===
6 April 1995
21:15

Zaragoza (Spain)	3–0	(England) Chelsea
Pardeza 7'; Esnáider 25', 55'	Report

La Romareda, Zaragoza
Attendance: 35,000
Referee: Leif Sundell (Sweden)

6 April 1995
20:00

Arsenal (England)	3–2	(Italy) Sampdoria
Bould 34', 37'; Wright 69'	Report	Jugović 51', 78'

Highbury, London
Attendance: 38,089
Referee: Jaap Uilenberg (Netherlands)

=== Second leg ===
20 April 1995
20:00

Chelsea (England)	3–1	(Spain) Zaragoza
Furlong 30'; Sinclair 62'; Stein 86'	Report	Aragón 54'

Stamford Bridge, London
Attendance: 26,456
Referee: Jorge Coroado (Portugal)

Zaragoza won 4–3 on aggregate.

20 April 1995
20:30

Sampdoria (Italy)	3–2 (a.e.t.)	(England) Arsenal
Mancini 13'; Bellucci 85', 86'	Report	Wright 60'; Schwarz 89'
Penalties
Mihajlović (penalty missed); Jugović (penalty missed); Maspero (penalty scored); Mannini (penalty scored); Lombardo (penalty missed)	2–3	(penalty scored) Dixon; (penalty missed) McGoldrick; (penalty scored) Hartson; (penalty scored) Adams; (penalty missed) Merson

Stadio Luigi Ferraris, Genoa
Attendance: 34,353
Referee: Gerd Grabher (Austria)

5–5 on aggregate. Arsenal won 3–2 on penalties.

== Final ==
10 May 1995
20:15 CEST

Arsenal (England)	1–2 (a.e.t.)	(Spain) Zaragoza
Hartson 75'	Report	Esnáider 67'; Nayim 119'

Parc des Princes, Paris
Attendance: 42,424
Referee: Piero Ceccarini (Italy)

== Top goalscorers ==
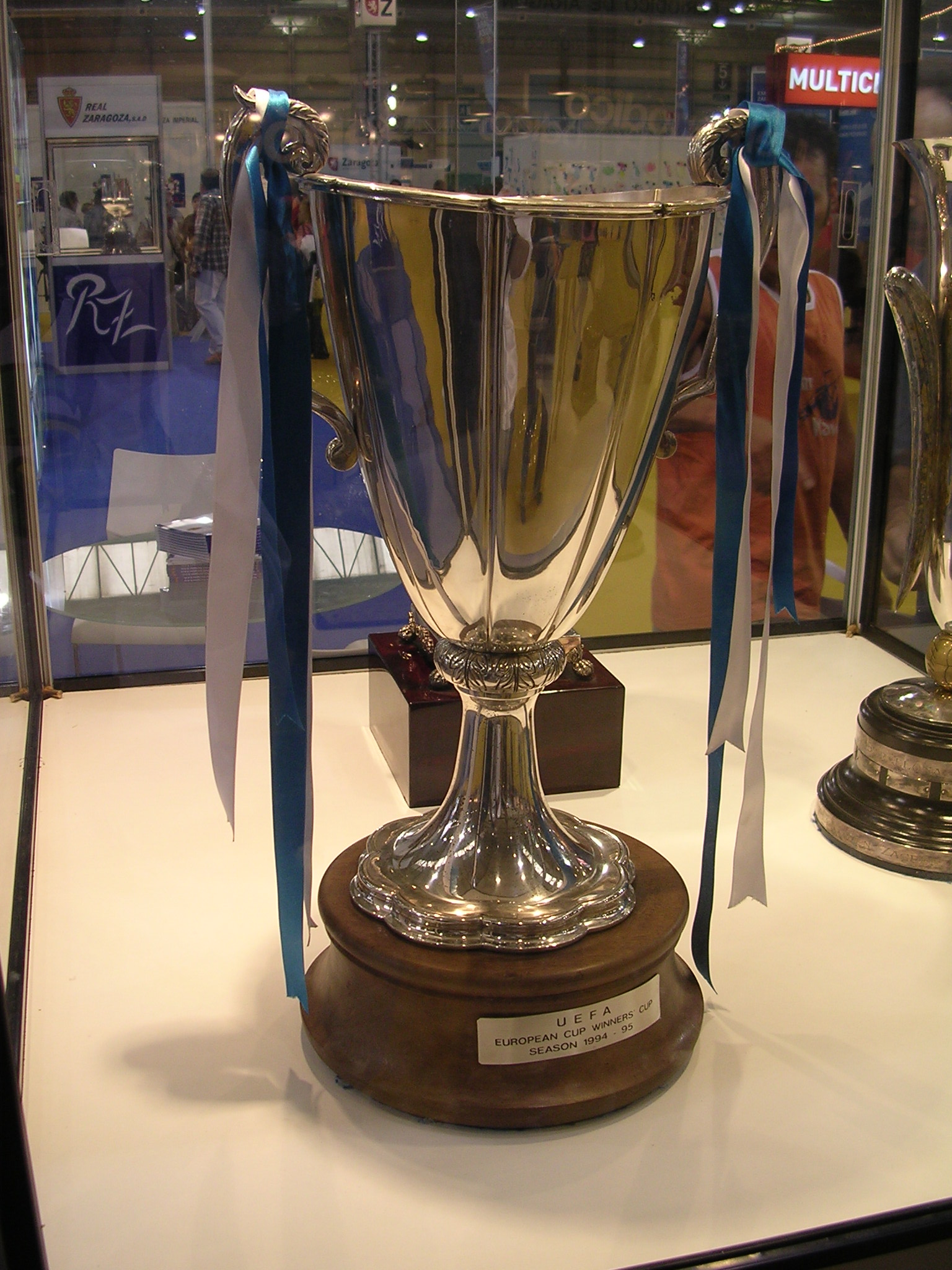
A replica of the UEFA Cup Winners' Cup trophy at the Zaragoza museum

Rank	Name	Team	Goals
1	(England) Ian Wright	(England) Arsenal	9
2	(Argentina) Juan Esnáider	(Spain) Zaragoza	8
3	(Sweden) Henrik Larsson	(Netherlands) Feyenoord	7
4	(Albania) Kliton Bozgo	(Slovenia) Maribor	5
5	(Hungary) Péter Lipcsei	(Hungary) Ferencváros	4
5	(Norway) Bent Inge Johnsen	(Norway) Bodø/Glimt	4
5	(Slovakia) Róbert Kociš	(Slovakia) Tatran Prešov	4
8	(Albania) Indrit Fortuzi	(Albania) KF Tirana	3
8	(Belgium) Lorenzo Staelens	(Belgium) Club Brugge	3
8	(England) Paul Furlong	(England) Chelsea	3
8	(France) Sabri Lamouchi	(France) Auxerre	3
8	(Greece) Alexis Alexoudis	(Greece) Panathinaikos	3
8	(North Macedonia) Milko Gjurovski	(Slovenia) Maribor	3
8	(Poland) Krzysztof Warzycha	(Greece) Panathinaikos	3
8	(Romania) Eugen Neagoe	(Hungary) Ferencváros	3
8	(Federal Republic of Yugoslavia) Ljubinko Drulović	(Portugal) Porto	3
8	(Slovakia) Vladislav Zvara	(Slovakia) Tatran Prešov	3
8	(Slovenia) Ante Šimundža	(Slovenia) Maribor	3
8	(Spain) Miguel Pardeza	(Spain) Zaragoza	3
8	(Uruguay) Gus Poyet	(Spain) Zaragoza	3

== See also ==
- 1994–95 UEFA Champions League
- 1994–95 UEFA Cup
