= 1993–94 Slovak Cup =

Tournament details
- Country: Slovakia
- Teams: 40

Final positions
- Champions: Slovan Bratislava
- Runners-up: Tatran Prešov

The 1993–94 Slovak Cup was the 25th season of Slovakia's annual knock-out cup competition and the first ever since the independence of Slovakia. It began on 4 August 1993 with the matches of first round and ended on 7 June 1994 with the final. The winners of the competition earned a place in the qualifying round of the UEFA Cup Winners' Cup. 1. FC Košice were the defending champions (the last winner of the cup in Czechoslovak era).

== First round ==
The fifteen games were played on 4 August 1993 and the match Spartak ZŤS Dubnica – MŠK Žilina was played on 8 August 1993.

Team 1	Score	Team 2
ŠM Gabčíkovo	3–2	STK Senec
SH Senica	8–0	ŠKP jun.
Tempo Partizánske	0–3	Baník Prievidza
BSC JAS Bardejov	3–0	Slavoj Trebišov
NCHZ - DAK Nováky	1–1 (0–3 p)	Slovmag Jelšava
Kinex Bytča	2–1	Texicom Ružomberok
Matador Púchov	3–3 (4–3 p)	Spartak Vráble
Slovan Bratislava B	0–2	Artmedia Petržalka
Bukóza Vranov nad Topľou	1–1 (2–4 p)	Lokomotíva Košice
Spartak Myjava	1–2	ŠKP Bratislava
Rimavská Sobota	1–1 (6–7 p)	Chemlon Humenné
Agrokombinát Budkovce	1–1 (5–3 p)	1. FC Košice B
Nové Zámky	2–1	Slovan Levice
Ozeta Dukla Trenčín	1–1 (3–2 p)	Slovan Duslo Šaľa
MFK Rožňava	1–0	Tesla Stropkov
Spartak ZŤS Dubnica	1–1 (10–11 p)	MŠK Žilina

== Second round ==
The games were played on 10 August 1993.

Team 1	Score	Team 2
Slovmag Jelšava	1–2	Matador Púchov
ŠKP Bratislava	5–1	Nové Zámky
Artmedia Petržalka	0–0 (3–4 p)	Ozeta Dukla Trenčín
MFK Rožňava	2–0	Agrokombinát Budkovce
Baník Prievidza	0–0 (3–4 p)	MŠK Žilina
Chemlon Humenné	1–1 (4–5 p)	Lokomotíva Košice
BSC JAS Bardejov	4–0	Kinex Bytča
SH Senica	1–1 (5–4 p)	ŠM Gabčíkovo

== Third round ==
The games were played on 24 and 25 August 1993.

Team 1	Score	Team 2
Dukla Banská Bystrica	4–0	ŠKP Bratislava
SH Senica	0–2	Slovan Bratislava
Ozeta Dukla Trenčín	0–3	Spartak Trnava
Tatran Prešov	1–1 (5–4 p)	MŠK Žilina
MFK Rožňava	0–7	Inter Bratislava
DAC Dunajská Streda	2–0	BSC JAS Bardejov
FC Nitra	0–0 (2–4 p)	Matador Púchov
1. FC Košice	4–0	Lokomotíva Košice

Sources: ,

== Quarter-finals ==
The games were played on 21 and 22 September 1993.

Team 1	Score	Team 2
Matador Púchov	0–1	Tatran Prešov
Spartak Trnava	1–2	DAC Dunajská Streda
Inter Bratislava	4–0	1. FC Košice
Slovan Bratislava	5–1	Dukla Banská Bystrica

== Semi-finals ==
The first legs were played on 5 and 13 October 1993. The second legs were played on 23 November 1993.

=== First legs ===
5 October 1993	Inter Bratislava	4–2	Tatran Prešov	Bratislava
	Solár 20' (pen.), 63', 85' (pen.); Moravec 74'	Report	Rusnák 1'; Zvara 48'	Stadium: Štadión Pasienky; Attendance: 1,349; Referee: Ladislav Gádoši

13 October 1993	Slovan Bratislava	2–0	DAC Dunajská Streda	Bratislava
	Gostič 75'; Végh 77' (o.g.)	Report		Stadium: Tehelné pole Attendance: 7,210; Referee: Miroslav Velický

=== Second legs ===
23 November 1993	Tatran Prešov	3–0 (5–4 agg.)	Inter Bratislava	Prešov
	Bajtoš 27'; Matta 30'; Gallakberov 85'	Report		Stadium: Štadión Tatranu; Attendance: 3,500; Referee: Karol Ihring

23 November 1993	DAC Dunajská Streda	0–1 (0–3 agg.)	Slovan Bratislava	Dunajská Streda
		Report	Chvíla 45'	Stadium: Mestský štadión Attendance: 1,500; Referee: Miroslav Velický

== Final ==
7 June 1994
17:00 CEST

Slovan Bratislava	2–1 (a.e.t.)	Tatran Prešov
Faktor 52' (pen.); Timko 95'	Report	Matta 11'

Mestský štadión Brezno, Brezno
Attendance: 5,620
Referee: Karol Ihring
