= 1994–95 UC Sampdoria season =

Sampdoria
1994–95 season
- President: Enrico Mantovani
- Manager: Sven-Göran Eriksson
- Stadium: Stadio Luigi Ferraris
- Serie A: 8th
- Coppa Italia: Round of 16
- UEFA Cup Winners' Cup: Semi-finals
- Supercoppa Italiana: Runners-up
- Top goalscorer: League: Ruud Gullit; Roberto Mancini (9 each); All: Roberto Mancini (11 goals)
Home colours	Away colours	Third colours

Unione Calcio Sampdoria spent the 1994–95 season mired in the midfield, since its remarkable offensive play from the 1993–94 season failed to occur. Despite this, it came close to another European final, but stumbled at Arsenal following penalties in the semi-finals. Following the end of the season, creative midfielders David Platt, Attilio Lombardo and Vladimir Jugović all left the club, bringing further uncertainty of the future direction of the club.

== Players ==
Note: Flags indicate national team as defined under FIFA eligibility rules; some limited exceptions apply. Players may hold more than one non-FIFA nationality.

Pos.	Nation	Player
GK	ITA	Walter Zenga
GK	ITA	Giulio Nucari
DF	ITA	Moreno Mannini
DF	ITA	Riccardo Ferri
DF	ITA	Pietro Vierchowod
DF	ITA	Stefano Sacchetti
DF	ITA	Michele Serena
DF	YUG	Siniša Mihajlović
DF	ITA	Marco Rossi
MF	ITA	Giovanni Invernizzi

Pos.	Nation	Player
MF	ITA	Attilio Lombardo
MF	YUG	Vladimir Jugović
MF	ENG	David Platt
MF	ITA	Riccardo Maspero
MF	ITA	Fausto Salsano
MF	ITA	Alberigo Evani
FW	ITA	Roberto Mancini
FW	NED	Ruud Gullit
FW	ITA	Alessandro Melli
FW	ITA	Claudio Bellucci
FW	ITA	Mauro Bertarelli
FW	ITA	Maurizio Sala

=== Transfers ===
In
Pos.	Name	from	Type
FW	Alessandro Melli	Parma F.C.	-
DF	Siniša Mihajlović	A.S. Roma	-
GK	Walter Zenga	Inter Milan	-
DF	Riccardo Ferri	Inter	-
MF	Riccardo Maspero	U.S. Cremonese	-

Out
Pos.	Name	To	Type
FW	Enrico Chiesa	U.S. Cremonese	loan
FW	Ruud Gullit	A.C. Milan	loan ended
MF	Srečko Katanec		released
GK	Gianluca Pagliuca	Inter	-
FW	Nicola Amoruso	Fidelis Andria	loan

=== Transfers ===
In
Pos.	Name	from	Type
FW	Ruud Gullit	A.C. Milan	loan

Out
Pos.	Name	To	Type
FW	Alessandro Melli	A.C. Milan	loan

== Competitions ==
=== Supercoppa Italiana ===
28 August 1994	Milan	1–1 (4–3 p)	Sampdoria	Milan
	Gullit 83'		Mihajlović 36'	Stadium: San Siro; Attendance: 26,767; Referee: Pierluigi Pairetto
	Penalties
	Albertini (penalty scored); Boban (penalty scored); Simone (penalty scored); Costacurta (penalty scored)		(penalty scored) Platt; (penalty scored) Vierchowod; (penalty missed) Evani; (penalty scored) Jugović; (penalty missed) Mihajlović

=== Serie A ===
==== League table ====
Pos	Team	Pld	W	D	L	GF	GA	GD	Pts	Qualification or relegation
6	Internazionale	34	14	10	10	39	34	+5	52	Qualification to UEFA Cup
7	Napoli	34	13	12	9	40	45	−5	51	
8	Sampdoria	34	13	11	10	51	37	+14	50	
9	Cagliari	34	13	10	11	40	39	+1	49	
10	Fiorentina	34	12	11	11	61	57	+4	47	

Source: Serie A, RSSSF.com, Soccerway
Rules for classification: 1) Points; 2) Head-to-head points; 3) Head-to-head goal difference; 4) Goal difference; 5) Goals scored; 6) Draw. (Note: Head-to-head record is used only after all the matches between the teams in question have been played).

==== Results summary ====
Overall								Home						Away					
Pld	W	D	L	GF	GA	GD	Pts	W	D	L	GF	GA	GD	W	D	L	GF	GA	GD
34	13	11	10	51	37	+14	50	9	6	2	35	18	+17	4	5	8	16	19	−3

Source: Worldfootball

==== Results by round ====
Round	1	2	3	4	5	6	7	8	9	10	11	12	13	14	15	16	17	18	19	20	21	22	23	24	25	26	27	28	29	30	31	32	33	34
Ground	H	A	H	A	A	H	A	H	A	H	A	H	A	H	H	A	H	A	H	A	H	H	A	H	A	H	A	H	A	H	A	A	H	A
Result	W	W	D	L	L	W	D	D	L	D	D	W	D	W	W	L	D	W	W	D	L	W	L	L	L	W	D	D	L	W	W	L	D	W
Position	1	1	2	4	9	6	7	8	8	9	9	7	7	7	6	7	7	5	4	5	6	6	6	7	9	9	9	9	10	9	7	9	9	8

Source: Competitive matches
A = Away; H = Home; W = Win; D = Draw; L = Loss; = 1995–96 UEFA Champions League; = 1995–96 UEFA Cup

==== Matches ====
4 September 1994 1	Sampdoria	5–0	Padova	Genoa
	R. Mancini 13'; Evani 42'; Platt 52'; Mihajlović 67'; Melli 80' (pen.)	Report		Stadium: Stadio Luigi Ferraris; Attendance: 21,000; Referee: Salvatore Racalbuto

11 September 1994 2	Reggiana	0–2	Sampdoria	Reggio Emilia
		Report	R. Mancini 85'; Lombardo 90'	Stadium: Stadio Giglio; Attendance: 16,000; Referee: Piero Ceccarini

18 September 1994 3	Sampdoria	1–1	Foggia	Genoa
	Bertarelli 43'	Report	Bianchini (red card) 81'; Di Biagio 86'; F. Mancini (red card) 88'	Stadium: Stadio Luigi Ferraris; Attendance: 20,000; Referee: Marcello Cardona

25 September 1994 4	Juventus	1–0	Sampdoria	Turin
	Di Livio 34'	Report		Stadium: Stadio Delle Alpi; Attendance: 51,000; Referee: Angelo Amendolia

2 October 1994 5	Roma	1–0	Sampdoria	Rome
	Balbo 56'	Report		Stadium: Stadio Olimpico; Referee: Pierluigi Pairetto

16 October 1994 6	Sampdoria	3–1	Parma	Genoa
	Maspero 75', 81'; R. Mancini 87' (pen.)	Report	Zola 43'; Di Chiara (red card) 86'	Stadium: Stadio Luigi Ferraris; Referee: Gianni Beschin

23 October 1994 7	Milan	0–0	Sampdoria	Milan
		Report		Stadium: San Siro; Referee: Robert Anthony Boggi

30 October 1994 8	Sampdoria	0–0	Napoli	Genoa
		Report		Stadium: Stadio Luigi Ferraris; Referee: Marcello Nicchi

6 November 1994 9	Cremonese	2–0	Sampdoria	Cremona
	Tentoni 43'; Florijančič 82'	Report	Mihajlović (red card) 45'	Stadium: Stadio Giovanni Zini; Referee: Emilio Pellegrino

20 November 1994 10	Sampdoria	1–1	Torino	Genoa
	Jugović 50'	Report	Osio 72'; Torrisi (red card) 74'	Stadium: Stadio Luigi Ferraris; Referee: Pasquale Rodomonti

27 November 1994 11	Fiorentina	2–2	Sampdoria	Florence
	Batistuta 60' (pen.); Luppi (red card) 71'; Vierchowod 73' (o.g.)	Report	Platt 39' (pen.); Gullit 88'	Stadium: Stadio Artemio Franchi; Referee: Roberto Bettin

4 December 1994 12	Sampdoria	3–2	Genoa	Genoa
	Vierchowod 15'; Lombardo 24'; Maspero 83'	Report	Miura 14'; Galante 87'	Stadium: Stadio Luigi Ferraris; Referee: Piero Ceccarini

11 December 1994 13	Brescia	0–0	Sampdoria	Brescia
		Report		Stadium: Stadio Mario Rigamonti; Referee: Giuseppe Rosica

18 December 1994 14	Sampdoria	5–0	Cagliari	Genoa
	Lombardo 8'; Gullit 14', 19'; R. Mancini 45'; Bellucci 67'	Report		Stadium: Stadio Luigi Ferraris; Referee: Stefano Braschi

8 January 1995 15	Sampdoria	3–1	Lazio	Genoa
	Mihajlović 8'; Platt 35' (pen.), 50'	Report	Signori 12', (penalty missed) 57'	Stadium: Stadio Luigi Ferraris; Referee: Angelo Amendolia

15 January 1995 16	Internazionale	2–0	Sampdoria	Milan
	Festa 57'; Fontolan 67'	Report	Vierchowod (red card) 55'	Stadium: San Siro; Referee: Virginio Quartuccio

22 January 1995 17	Sampdoria	1–1	Bari	Genoa
	Platt (penalty missed) 28'; Lombardo 79'	Report	Tovalieri 8'	Stadium: Stadio Luigi Ferraris; Referee: Fiorenzo Treossi

29 January 1995 18	Padova	1–4	Sampdoria	Padua
	Zattarin 88'	Report	Platt 14'; Maspero 48'; R. Mancini 69'; Jugović 75'	Stadium: Stadio Euganeo; Referee: Marcello Nicchi

12 February 1995 19	Sampdoria	2–1	Reggiana	Genoa
	Sgarbossa 45' (o.g.); Lombardo 89'	Report	Padovano 32' (pen.)	Stadium: Stadio Luigi Ferraris; Referee: Gennaro Borriello

19 February 1995 20	Foggia	1–1	Sampdoria	Foggia
	Bresciani 44'	Report	Gullit 64'	Stadium: Stadio Pino Zaccheria; Referee: Pierluigi Collina

26 February 1995 21	Sampdoria	0–1	Juventus	Genoa
		Report	Vialli 80'	Stadium: Stadio Luigi Ferraris; Referee: Robert Anthony Boggi

5 March 1995 22	Sampdoria	3–0	Roma	Genoa
	Rossi 26'; Gullit 47', 77'	Report	Moriero (red card) 37'	Stadium: Stadio Luigi Ferraris; Referee: Alfredo Trentalange

12 March 1995 23	Parma	3–2	Sampdoria	Parma
	Zola 19', 75', (penalty missed) 67'; Asprilla 22'	Report	Lombardo 55' (pen.); Gullit 64'; Mannini (red card) 77'	Stadium: Stadio Ennio Tardini; Referee: Livio Bazzoli

19 March 1995 24	Sampdoria	0–3	Milan	Genoa
	Mannini (red card) 52'	Report	Simone 11'; Albertini 71', 90'	Stadium: Stadio Luigi Ferraris; Attendance: 35,000; Referee: Roberto Bettin

2 April 1995 25	Napoli	2–0	Sampdoria	Naples
	Carbone 32'; Agostini 43'	Report		Stadium: Stadio San Paolo; Referee: Stefano Braschi

9 April 1995 26	Sampdoria	2–1	Cremonese	Genoa
	R. Mancini 13'; Jugović 87'	Report	Chiesa 55' (pen.)	Stadium: Stadio Luigi Ferraris; Referee: Angelo Amendolia

15 April 1995 27	Torino	0–0	Sampdoria	Turin
		Report		Stadium: Stadio Delle Alpi; Referee: Daniele Tombolini

23 April 1995 28	Sampdoria	2–2	Fiorentina	Genoa
	Gullit 9', 72'	Report	Batistuta 75'; Baiano 79'	Stadium: Stadio Luigi Ferraris; Referee: Cosimo Bolognino

30 April 1995 29	Genoa	2–1	Sampdoria	Genoa
	van 't Schip 68'; Skuhravý 76' (pen.)	Report	Platt 53'	Stadium: Stadio Luigi Ferraris; Referee: Piero Ceccarini

7 May 1995 30	Sampdoria	2–1	Brescia	Genoa
	Platt 86' (pen.), 90'	Report	Baronchelli 2'; Corini (penalty missed) 51'	Stadium: Stadio Luigi Ferraris; Referee: Massimo De Santis

14 May 1995 31	Cagliari	0–2	Sampdoria	Cagliari
	Herrera (red card) 70'; Oliveira (red card) 90'	Report	R. Mancini 62', 73'	Stadium: Stadio Sant'Elia; Referee: Roberto Bettin

21 May 1995 32	Lazio	1–0	Sampdoria	Rome
	Winter 81'	Report		Stadium: Stadio Olimpico; Referee: Salvatore Racalbuto

28 May 1995 33	Sampdoria	2–2	Internazionale	Genoa
	Vierchowod 25'; Platt (red card) 57'; Bellucci 66'	Report	Festa 5'; Bergkamp (penalty missed) 57'; Bianchi 86'	Stadium: Stadio Luigi Ferraris; Referee: Pierluigi Pairetto

4 June 1995 34	Bari	1–2	Sampdoria	Bari
	Amoruso 69'	Report	Mihajlović 28'; R. Mancini 43'	Stadium: Stadio San Nicola; Referee: Loris Stafoggia

=== Coppa Italia ===
==== Second round ====
31 August 1994 First leg	Sampdoria	5–1	Vicenza	Genoa
20:30 CEST (UTC+02:00)	R. Mancini 10'; Lopez 23', 77' (o.g.); Lombardo 55'; Bertarelli 89'		Briaschi 49'	Stadium: Stadio Luigi Ferraris; Attendance: 2,500; Referee: Cosimo Bolognino

21 September 1994 Second leg	Vicenza	2–1 (3–6 agg.)	Sampdoria	Vicenza
	Capecchi 26'; Beghetto 76'		Lombardo 52'	Stadium: Stadio Romeo Menti; Attendance: 1,123; Referee: Massimo De Santis

==== Round of 16 ====
12 October 1994 First leg	Fiorentina	2–1	Sampdoria	Florence
	Robbiati 72'; Batistuta 87'		Melli 4'; Invernizzi (red card) 89'	Stadium: Stadio Artemio Franchi; Referee: Giuseppe Rosica

26 October 1994 Second leg	Sampdoria	1–1 (2–3 agg.)	Fiorentina	Genoa
	Melli 77' (pen.)		Batistuta 54'	Stadium: Stadio Luigi Ferraris; Referee: Alfredo Trentalange

=== UEFA Cup Winners' Cup ===
==== First round ====
15 September 1994 1	Bodø/Glimt (Norway)	3–2	(Italy) Sampdoria	Oslo, Norway
20:30 CEST (UTC+02:00)	Staurvik 2'; Johnsen 32', 58'	Report	Bertarelli 47'; Platt 67'	Stadium: Ullevaal Stadion; Attendance: 2,015; Referee: Stephen Lodge (England)

29 September 1994 2	Sampdoria (Italy)	2–0 (4–3 agg.)	(Norway) Bodø/Glimt	Genoa, Italy
20:30 CEST (UTC+01:00)	Platt 13'; Lombardo 37'	Report		Stadium: Stadio Luigi Ferraris; Attendance: 28,656; Referee: Vladimir Hrinak (Slovakia)

==== Second round ====
20 October 1994 1	Sampdoria (Italy)	3–0	(Switzerland) Grasshopper	Genoa, Italy
20:30 CEST (UTC+01:00)	Melli 45'; Mihajlović 76'; Maspero 83'	Report		Stadium: Stadio Luigi Ferraris; Attendance: 25,316; Referee: Ryszard Wójcik (Poland)

3 November 1994 2	Grasshopper (Switzerland)	3–2 (5–3 agg.)	(Italy) Sampdoria	Zurich, Switzerland
20:30 CEST (UTC+01:00)	Willems 13'; Bickel 52'; Koller 55'	Report	Melli 17'; Lombardo 40'	Stadium: Hardturm; Attendance: 12,100; Referee: John Blankenstein (Netherlands)

==== Quarter-finals ====
2 March 1995 1	Sampdoria (Italy)	0–1	(Portugal) Porto	Genoa, Italy
20:45 CEST (UTC+01:00)		Report	Yuran 65'	Stadium: Stadio Luigi Ferraris; Attendance: 21,004; Referee: David Elleray (England)

16 March 1995 2	Porto (Portugal)	0–1 (1–1 agg.) (3–5 p)	(Italy) Sampdoria	Porto, Portugal
21:00 CEST (UTC+01:00)		Report	R. Mancini 48'; Platt (red card) 117'	Stadium: Estádio das Antas; Attendance: 35,076; Referee: Marc Batta (France)
	Penalties
	Emerson (penalty scored); Latapy (penalty missed); Domingos (penalty scored); Folha (penalty scored)		(penalty scored) Mihajlović; (penalty scored) Jugović; (penalty scored) Maspero; (penalty scored) Salsano; (penalty scored) Lombardo

==== Semi-final ====
6 April 1995 1	Arsenal (England)	3–2	(Italy) Sampdoria	London, England
21:00 CEST (UTC+02:00)	Bould 34', 37'; Wright 69'	Report	Jugović 51', 78'	Stadium: Highbury; Attendance: 38,100; Referee: Jaap Uilenberg (Netherlands)

20 April 1995 2	Sampdoria (Italy)	3–2 (5–5 agg.) (2–3 p)	(England) Arsenal	Genoa, Italy
20:30 CEST (UTC+02:00)	R. Mancini 14'; Bellucci 85', 86'	Report	Wright 60'; Schwarz 89'	Stadium: Stadio Luigi Ferraris; Attendance: 35,000; Referee: Gerd Grabher (Austria)
	Penalties
	Mihajlović (penalty missed); Jugović (penalty missed); Maspero (penalty scored); Mannini (penalty scored); Lombardo (penalty missed)		(penalty scored) Dixon; (penalty missed) McGoldrick; (penalty scored) Hartson; (penalty scored) Adams; (penalty missed) Merson

== Statistics ==
=== Players statistics ===
No.	Pos	Nat	Player	Total		Serie A		Coppa		UCWC	
No.	Pos	Nat	Player	Apps	Goals	Apps	Goals	Apps	Goals	Apps	Goals
	GK	(Italy) ITA	Zenga	46	-55	34	-37	4	-6	8	-12
	DF	(Italy) ITA	Mannini	36	0	28	0	2	0	6	0
	DF	(Italy) ITA	Vierchowod	40	2	31	2	4	0	5	0
	DF	(Federal Republic of Yugoslavia) YUG	Mihajlovic	33	4	25	3	2	0	6	1
	DF	(Italy) ITA	Serena	38	0	25+2	0	3	0	8	0
	MF	(Italy) ITA	Lombardo	45	10	33	6	4	2	8	2
	MF	(Italy) ITA	Evani	35	1	20+3	1	4	0	8	0
	MF	(England) ENG	Platt	33	10	26	8	2	0	5	2
	MF	(Federal Republic of Yugoslavia) YUG	Jugovic	31	5	21	3	4	0	6	2
	FW	(Netherlands) NED	Gullit	22	9	21+1	9				
	FW	(Italy) ITA	Mancini	37	12	31	9	2	1	4	2
	GK	(Italy) ITA	Nuciari	0	0	0	0	0	0	0	0
	DF	(Italy) ITA	Ferri	28	0	19+1	0	3	0	5	0
	MF	(Italy) ITA	Invernizzi	30	0	14+8	0	2	0	6	0
	MF	(Italy) ITA	Maspero	28	5	10+11	4	1	0	6	1
	FW	(Italy) ITA	Bellucci	24	4	9+12	2	1	0	2	2
	FW	(Italy) ITA	Melli	14	5	8	1	3	2	3	2
	MF	(Italy) ITA	Salsano	29	0	6+14	0	3	0	6	0
	DF	(Italy) ITA	Rossi	15	1	6+3	1	1	0	5	0
	DF	(Italy) ITA	Sacchetti	17	0	4+6	0	4	0	3	0
	FW	(Italy) ITA	Bertarelli	6	3	1+1	1	2	1	2	1
	FW	(Italy) ITA	Sala	2	0	0+1	0	1	0		

- Source: http://calcio-seriea.net/formazioni/1994/1084/
