= 1993–94 Slovak Superliga =

1. Liga
- Season: 1993–94
- Dates: 14 August 1993 – 15 June 1994
- Champions: ŠK Slovan Bratislava
- Relegated: FC Nitra
- UEFA Cup: ŠK Slovan Bratislava; 1. FC Tatran Prešov; Inter Bratislava
- Matches: 192
- Goals: 512 (2.67 per match)
- Top goalscorer: Pavol Diňa (19 goals)
- Biggest home win: Inter 7:1 Lokomotíva
- Biggest away win: Trnava 0:4 B.Bystrica
- Highest scoring: Inter 7:1 Lokomotíva; Prešov 4:4 D.Streda
- Average attendance: 3,474

The 1993–94 Slovak First Football League season was the first edition of top flight Slovak First Football League annual football competition in Slovak football following the dissolution of Czechoslovakia on 1 January 1993. The season started on 14 August 1993 and ended on 15 June 1994.

== Overview ==
The 1993–94 Slovak Superliga was formed based on the six teams that competed in the 1992–93 Czechoslovak First League (Slovan Bratislava, DAC 1904 Dunajsk Streda, Inter Bratislava, Tatran Prešov, FC Nitra, Spartak Trnava) and the six best teams of the 1992–93 Slovak National Football League (the Czechoslovak second-tier competition) (1. FC Košice, Dukla Banská Bystrica, ŠK Žilina, Baník Prievidza, Chemlon Humenné, Lokomotíva Košice). These 12 teams contested home-and-away regular league matches totalling 22 games. The top six clubs then formed a promotion/championship group and the bottom six a relegation group, each group playing 10 more games.

It was a historic season for Slovak football as it was the first season to take place since the breakup of the former Czechoslovakia. Three Slovak teams qualified for European club competitions: Slovan Bratislava and DAC Dunajská Streda (both in the UEFA Cup), as well as 1.FC Košice (Cup Winners Cup). Of these only Košice (a second-tier team that had to take part in the qualifying round) managed to get past their first hurdle (Košice would ultimately be eliminated in the first round proper by Besiktas from Turkey).

At the end of the season two teams were entitled to enter the newly added qualifying round of the UEFA Cup, and one team would take part in the qualifying round of the Cup Winners Cup. These European places would go on to Tatran Presov (Cup Winners Cup), and two clubs from the capital Bratislava: Slovan (denied a place in the revamped Champions League due to insufficient coefficient) and Inter (who actually would have entered the Champions League qualifying round had they become champion).

== Teams ==
=== Stadiums and locations ===
Location of teams in 1993–94 1. Liga

Team	Home city	Stadium	Capacity
1. FC Košice	Košice	Všešportový areál	30,312
Chemlon Humenné	Humenné	Chemlon Stadion	10,000
Dukla Banská Bystrica	Banská Bystrica	SNP Stadium	10,000
DAC 1904 Dunajská Streda	Dunajská Streda	Mestský štadión - DAC Dunajská Streda	16,410
Inter Slovnaft Bratislava	Bratislava	Štadión Pasienky	12,000
Lokomotíva Košice	Košice	Lokomotíva Stadium	9,000
FC Nitra	Nitra	Štadión pod Zoborom	11,384
MFK Petrimex Prievidza	Prievidza	Futbalový štadión Prievidza	6,000
MŠK Žilina	Žilina	Štadión pod Dubňom	11,181
Slovan Bratislava	Bratislava	Tehelné pole	30,085
Spartak Trnava	Trnava	Štadión Antona Malatinského	18,448
Tatran Prešov	Prešov	Tatran Štadión	14,000

== Regular season ==
=== League table ===
Pos	Team	Pld	W	D	L	GF	GA	GD	Pts	Qualification
1	Slovan Bratislava	22	17	3	2	45	15	+30	37	Qualification for championship group
2	Inter Bratislava	22	14	2	6	49	28	+21	30	Qualification for championship group
3	DAC Dunajská Streda	22	11	4	7	38	26	+12	26	Qualification for championship group
4	Žilina	22	9	6	7	32	22	+10	24	Qualification for championship group
5	1. FC Košice	22	7	8	7	25	31	−6	22	Qualification for championship group
6	Tatran Prešov	22	6	9	7	24	28	−4	21	Qualification for championship group
7	Dukla Banská Bystrica	22	8	5	9	23	29	−6	21	Qualification for relegation group
8	Spartak Trnava	22	5	8	9	19	26	−7	18	Qualification for relegation group
9	Lokomotíva Košice	22	4	9	9	21	40	−19	17	Qualification for relegation group
10	Chemlon Humenné	22	5	7	10	22	34	−12	17	Qualification for relegation group
11	Nitra	22	7	2	13	24	30	−6	16	Qualification for relegation group
12	Baník Prievidza	22	5	5	12	21	34	−13	15	Qualification for relegation group

Source: ClaudioNicoletti.eu
Rules for classification: 1) points; 2) goal difference; 3) number of goals scored.

=== Results ===
Home \ Away	BB	DAC	HUM	INT	KOŠ	LOK	NIT	PRE	PRI	SLO	TRN	ŽIL
Dukla Banská Bystrica		4–1	1–0	1–3	0–1	0–0	1–0	1–0	4–0	1–2	0–0	0–2
DAC Dunajská Streda	4–0		1–0	2–2	0–0	4–0	1–0	2–0	4–1	4–3	1–0	2–0
Chemlon Humenné	1–1	2–0		3–1	1–0	1–1	4–2	0–0	1–0	0–2	0–0	3–3
Inter Bratislava	4–0	2–1	3–2		5–0	7–1	2–1	4–0	2–1	1–0	0–2	1–2
1. FC Košice	0–0	2–1	4–2	2–0		0–1	2–1	2–2	3–1	1–1	1–1	0–0
Lokomotíva Košice	1–1	2–1	3–0	1–2	2–2		1–4	1–1	1–1	0–1	1–1	1–0
Nitra	0–2	1–3	0–0	2–4	2–0	1–0		4–1	0–1	0–1	2–1	1–0
Prešov	3–0	2–2	3–1	0–0	1–0	1–1	3–1		2–0	1–2	1–1	0–0
Baník Prievidza	1–2	3–1	0–0	1–3	1–1	3–1	1–0	2–3		0–1	3–0	0–0
Slovan Bratislava	3–0	2–0	1–0	1–0	6–1	5–1	0–0	2–0	4–1		3–1	2–1
Spartak Trnava	0–4	0–0	2–0	2–3	2–0	1–1	2–0	2–0	0–0	0–1		1–2
Žilina	3–0	0–3	6–1	3–0	1–3	3–0	0–2	0–0	1–0	2–2	3–0	

Source: EU-Football.info
Legend: Blue = home team win; Yellow = draw; Red = away team win.

== Championship group ==
=== League table ===
Pos	Team	Pld	W	D	L	GF	GA	GD	Pts	Qualification
1	Slovan Bratislava (C)	32	20	10	2	63	28	+35	50	Qualification for UEFA Cup preliminary round
2	Inter Bratislava	32	18	4	10	65	45	+20	40	Qualification for UEFA Cup preliminary round
3	DAC Dunajská Streda	32	13	10	9	62	47	+15	36	
4	Tatran Prešov	32	10	14	8	47	43	+4	34	Qualification for Cup Winners' Cup qualifying round (Note: Tatran Prešov qualify for 1994–95 UEFA Cup Winners' Cup as runner-up of 1993–94 Slovak Cup.)
5	Žilina	32	11	11	10	50	42	+8	33	
6	1. FC Košice	32	8	11	13	35	54	−19	27	

Source: ClaudioNicoletti.eu
Rules for classification: 1) points; 2) goal difference; 3) number of goals scored.
(C) Champions

=== Results ===
Home \ Away	DAC	INT	KOŠ	PRE	SLO	ŽIL
DAC Dunajská Streda		4–1	4–1	1–1	1–1	2–2
Inter Bratislava	3–1		3–1	2–0	2–3	2–4
1. FC Košice	2–2	1–1		1–3	1–1	3–0
Prešov	4–4	2–0	2–0		1–1	5–1
Slovan Bratislava	4–3	1–1	3–0	2–2		1–1
Žilina	2–2	0–1	4–0	3–3	1–1	

Source: EU-Football.info
Legend: Blue = home team win; Yellow = draw; Red = away team win.

== Relegation group ==
=== League table ===
Pos	Team	Pld	W	D	L	GF	GA	GD	Pts	Relegation
7	Spartak Trnava	32	8	12	12	25	32	−7	28	
8	Lokomotíva Košice	32	7	14	11	30	47	−17	28	
9	Dukla Banská Bystrica	32	9	9	14	31	43	−12	27	
10	Chemlon Humenné	32	7	13	12	31	43	−12	27	
11	Baník Prievidza	32	9	9	14	34	42	−8	27	
12	Nitra (R)	32	12	3	17	39	46	−7	27	Relegation to 2. Liga

Source: ClaudioNicoletti.eu
Rules for classification: 1) points; 2) goal difference; 3) number of goals scored.
(R) Relegated

=== Results ===
Home \ Away	BB	HUM	NIT	PRI	LOK	TRN
Dukla Banská Bystrica		2–2	0–1	1–2	1–2	0–0
Chemlon Humenné	0–1		3–1	2–2	0–0	1–1
Nitra	3–1	2–0		1–0	1–1	2–1
Baník Prievidza	3–1	0–1	4–1		1–1	1–0
Lokomotíva Košice	1–1	0–0	4–2	0–1		1–0
Spartak Trnava	0–0	0–0	2–1	1–0	1–0	

Source: EU-Football.info
Legend: Blue = home team win; Yellow = draw; Red = away team win.

== Season statistics ==
=== Top scorers ===
Rank	Player	Club	Goals
1	(Slovakia) Pavol Diňa	DAC Dunajska Streda	19
2	(Slovakia) Martin Obšitník	Inter Bratislava	14
2	(Slovakia) Mikuláš Radványi	DAC Dunajska Streda	14
4	(Slovakia) Ľubomír Zuziak	ŠK Žilina	13
4	(Slovakia) Ivan Šefčík	ŠK Žilina	13

== See also ==
- 1993–94 Slovak Cup
- 1993–94 2. Liga (Slovakia)
