= Juraj Szikora =

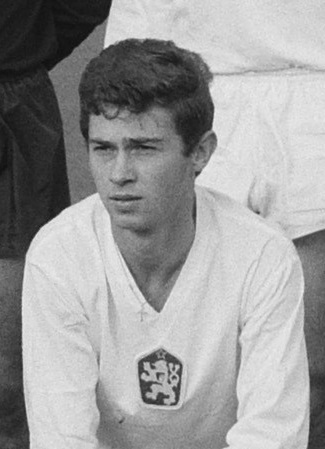
- Szikora in 1966

Personal information
- Date of birth: 2 March 1947
- Place of birth: Tvrdošovce, Czechoslovakia
- Date of death: 12 December 2005 (aged 58)
- Place of death: Bratislava, Slovakia
- Positions: Midfielder; striker

Senior career*
Years	Team	Apps	(Gls)
1963–1964	Spartak Komárno		
1964–1977	Inter Bratislava	203	(56)
1977–1978	Vagónka Poprad		
1979–1980	DAC Dunajská Streda		
1980–1982	Slovan Wien		

International career
1966–1971	Czechoslovakia	21	(2)

Managerial career
- 1982–1984: DAC Dunajská Streda
- 1990–1991: DAC Dunajská Streda
- 1995–1996: DAC Dunajská Streda
- FK Poprad
- ŠKP Bratislava
- Slovan Duslo Šaľa
- Partizán Bardejov
- Rapid Bratislava
- ZŤS Petržalka
- Lokomotíva Košice
- 1997: MŠK Rimavská Sobota
- 1999: FC Nitra
- ZŤS Martin
- KOBA Senec
- FK Nové Zámky
- Dukla Trenčín
- ŠKP Devín
- 2001–2002: DAC Dunajská Streda
- 2003: DAC Dunajská Streda
- * Club domestic league appearances and goals

Juraj Szikora (Hungarian: Szikora György; 2 March 1947 – 12 December 2005) was a Czechoslovak footballer who played as a midfielder or striker. Known for his exceptional technical skill and vision, he earned the nickname "biely Pelé" (White Pelé) from Brazilian journalists during a 1966 tour of Brazil. He represented Czechoslovakia 21 times between 1966 and 1971.

== Club career ==
Szikora was born in Tvrdošovce, a village near Nové Zámky, into a family of Hungarian heritage. He began his career at Spartak Komárno before moving to Inter Bratislava in 1964, where he would spend the majority of his playing career. He made his first-team debut for Inter at age 17 in a Czechoslovak Cup derby match against Slovan Bratislava.

Szikora was noted for his elegant style of play, exceptional ball control, and unselfish approach to the game, often setting up goals for teammates rather than scoring himself. During his time at Inter, he played alongside notable players in what became one of the club's most celebrated forward lines. He made over 200 Czechoslovak First League appearances for Inter Bratislava, scoring 56 goals.

One of his most memorable derby moments came in 1970, when a league match against Slovan Bratislava was moved to Tehelné pole due to high demand, attracting 46,000 spectators. Inter won 2–1, with Szikora scoring the second goal. However, he also experienced heartbreak in the Bratislava derby; in 1972, with Inter fighting relegation, they needed a win against Slovan to survive. Leading 1–0 with the match in stoppage time, Slovan's Ivan Pekárik equalised in the 92nd minute, condemning Inter to relegation.

After leaving Inter in 1977, Szikora played for Vagónka Poprad, DAC Dunajská Streda, and Slovan Wien in Austria, before retiring from professional football in 1982.

== International career ==
Szikora earned 21 caps for Czechoslovakia between 1966 and 1971, scoring two goals. He was named among the best footballers in Czechoslovakia in three consecutive years: 1966, 1967, and 1968.

=== 1966 Brazil tour ===
In June 1966, Szikora was part of the Czechoslovak squad that toured Brazil and played two friendly matches at the Maracanã Stadium against the reigning World Cup champions. On 12 June, Czechoslovakia lost 2–1 before 88,000 spectators. Three days later, on 15 June, the teams drew 2–2, with Szikora scoring one of Czechoslovakia's goals. His performance, particularly his ball control and juggling skills, so impressed Brazilian journalists that they nicknamed him the "biely Pelé" (White Pelé). Szikora later recalled that playing against Pelé was his greatest footballing experience, saying he sometimes found himself watching Pelé rather than following the play.

=== World Cup and European Championship qualification ===
Szikora played nearly all of Czechoslovakia's qualifying matches for UEFA Euro 1968, scoring in a 2–0 away victory against Ireland in Dublin. However, he broke his fibula during the return match in Prague, which Czechoslovakia lost 2–1 in the final minutes, failing to qualify for the tournament.

He also played all of Czechoslovakia's 1970 FIFA World Cup qualifying matches. During this campaign, a 3–3 draw with Hungary in Prague led to controversy: some teammates and journalists accused Szikora of revealing Czechoslovak tactics to the Hungarian coach, whom he knew personally, due to his Hungarian background. The accusations were considered unjust. Czechoslovakia ultimately qualified for the 1970 FIFA World Cup after defeating Hungary 4–1 in a play-off in Marseille.

== Managerial career ==
After retiring as a player, Szikora became a manager and worked with numerous Slovak clubs throughout the 1980s, 1990s, and 2000s. He developed a reputation as a "rescue" manager, often being called upon when teams needed to avoid relegation. His clubs included Lokomotíva Košice, FC Nitra, KOBA Senec, MŠK Rimavská Sobota, ZŤS Martin, FK Nové Zámky, Dukla Trenčín, ŠKP Devín, and multiple stints with DAC Dunajská Streda.

== Death and legacy ==
Szikora died suddenly on 12 December 2005 in Bratislava at the age of 58. The Slovak Football Association announced his death, remembering him as an exceptional player and coach.

In a 2000 poll conducted by the newspaper Pravda to determine the best Slovak footballer of the 20th century, Szikora was ranked 42nd. Following his death, Pelé was reportedly informed of the news by Joe Borbély, European manager of the Brazilian football legends team, and expressed his sorrow at the loss of his "white brother".

== Career statistics ==
=== International ===
National team	Period	Apps	Goals
Czechoslovakia	1966–1971	21	2
