= Robert Klauß =

German football manager and former player

Personal information
- Date of birth: 1 December 1984 (age 41)
- Place of birth: Eberswalde, East Germany
- Height: 1.83 m (6 ft 0 in)
- Position: Forward

Youth career
- –2002: FV Motor Eberswalde

Senior career*
| Years | Team | Apps | (Gls) |
| 2005–2006 | Strausberg | | |
| 2006–2009 | Markranstädt | 42 | (13) |
| 2009–2010 | RB Leipzig | 1 | (0) |
| 2010–2011 | SG Taucha 99 (de) | | |
| 2011–2012 | RB Leipzig II | 18 | (4) |
| 2012–2013 | SG Taucha 99 (de) | | |
| 2013–2016 | Markranstädt II | | |
| 2013–2014 | Markranstädt | 5 | (2) |
| 2021 | Markranstädt | 1 | (0) |

Managerial career
- 2016–2017: RB Leipzig II
- 2020–2022: 1. FC Nürnberg
- 2023–2025: SK Rapid
- 2026–: DAC 1904 Dunajská Streda
- * Club domestic league appearances and goals

Robert Klauß (born 1 December 1984) is a German football manager and former player, who is the manager of Slovak club DAC 1904 Dunajská Streda.

== Manager career ==
On 20 November 2023, Klauß was appointed SK Rapid manager on a 3 year contract until 2026.

On 24 April 2025, Klauß was dismissed from his position as head coach following three consecutive losses amid a season of poor league results.

== Managerial statistics ==
As of match played 27 April 2025

Managerial record by team and tenure
| Team | From | To | Record | | | | | | | |
| Team | From | To | G | W | D | L | GF | GA | GD | Win % |
|---|---|---|---|---|---|---|---|---|---|---|
| RB Leipzig II | 1 July 2016 | 30 June 2017 | 34 | 17 | 9 | 8 | 67 | 42 | +25 | 50.00 |
| 1. FC Nürnberg | 30 July 2020 | 3 October 2022 | 82 | 30 | 22 | 30 | 108 | 122 | −14 | 36.59 |
| SK Rapid | 20 November 2023 | 24 April 2025 | 68 | 31 | 17 | 20 | 99 | 77 | +22 | 45.59 |
| Total | | | 184 | 78 | 48 | 58 | 274 | 241 | +33 | 42.39 |
