= Oszkár Világi =

Slovak businessman

Oszkár Világi (born 17 April 1963) is a Slovak businessman who is the owner of FC DAC 1904 Dunajská Streda and Győri ETO.

== Career ==
In 2014, he became owner of Slovak side FC DAC 1904 Dunajská Streda.
