= Pavol Diňa =

Slovak footballer and coach

Personal information
- Full name: Pavol Diňa
- Date of birth: 11 July 1963 (age 63)
- Place of birth: Snina, Czechoslovakia
- Position: Striker

Youth career
- MFK Snina

Senior career*
Years	Team	Apps	(Gls)
1981–1983	Chemlon Humenné	24	(2)
1983–1990	Dukla Banská Bystrica	184	(59)
1990–1994	DAC Dunajská Streda	122	(49)
1994–1996	1 F.C. Košice	47	(16)
1996	Lokomotíva Košice	13	(2)
1996–1997	Chemlon Humenné	24	(2)
1997–1999	Zemplín Michalovce		
Total		414	(131)

International career
1994	Slovakia	3	(0)

Managerial career
- 2005–: MFK Snina
- * Club domestic league appearances and goals

Pavol Diňa (born 11 July 1963 in Snina) is a Slovak football coach and former striker. He became the Slovak Superliga 1993-94 top goalscorer, netting 19 goals. Diňa scored 90 goals in the Czechoslovak League and 41 goals in the Slovak League.

== Honors ==
- Slovak Super Liga Top Scorer: 1993–94
