= Ladislav Škorpil =

Czech football manager (born 1945)

- Škorpil in 2009

Personal information
- Date of birth: 6 June 1945 (age 81)
- Place of birth: Hradec Králové, Czechoslovakia

Senior career*
Years	Team	Apps	(Gls)
1955–1964	RH Hradec Králové		
1964–1966	Dukla Žamberk		
1966–1968	RH Hradec Králové		

Managerial career
- 1969–1970: Spartak Hradec Králové (C/D Youth Team)
- 1971–1991: Spartak Hradec Králové (A/B Youth Team)
- 1982–1991: Czechoslovakia U-16, U-17, U-18
- 1991–1993: Spartak Hradec Králové
- 1993–1994: DAC Dunajská Streda
- 1994–1995: Spartak Hradec Králové (A Youth Team)
- 1995–1997: FK Dukla Prague
- 1997–1998: DAC Dunajská Streda
- 1998: Hradec Králové
- 1998–2004: Slovan Liberec
- 2004–2007: Czech Republic U-21
- 2007–2009: Slovan Liberec
- * Club domestic league appearances and goals

Ladislav Škorpil (born 6 June 1945, in Hradec Králové) is a former Czech football player and former manager of the Czech club Slovan Liberec. Škorpil is also a member of the Civic Democratic Party in his hometown of Hradec Králové.

== Coaching career ==
Ladislav Škorpil ended his playing career early and, at the age of 23, began the 1969/70 season as a C- and D-youth coach at Spartak Hradec Králové. During the 1970s, he worked for the A and B youth teams. In 1981, he won the Czechoslovak youth cup.

From 1982 to 1990, Škorpil worked as a youth coach in the Czechoslovakia national team. In 1986, he won a youth championship with Spartak Hradec Králové. In the final of the championship the team beat the Slovak team, Tatran Prešov.

Although he once said "I never want to work with adults", he took over the first team of Hradec Králové as a head coach in the 1990–91 season. In 1993, he went to Slovakia to work in a small club, DAC Dunajska Streda. During 1994–95, he again trained the youngsters of the Hradec Králové; between 1995 and 1997 he worked at FK Dukla Prague. In the autumn of 1997, Škorpil returned to DAC Dunajska Streda for one season. During the 1998–99 season, he again coached SK Hradec Králové until the ninth match-day.

During the season, he was contacted by Slovan Liberec, where, as a head coach, he unexpectedly won the Czech Cup in 2000, and two years later celebrated the first league title in Liberec. In January 2004, he agreed the termination of his contract with Slovan and took over the Czech U21 national team. In October 2007, he returned to his former club Slovan Liberec as a successor of sacked coach, Michal Zach.

== Honours ==
Slovan Liberec

- Czech Cup: 2000
- Czech First League: 2001–02
