= Róbert Kociš =

Slovak footballer

Personal information
- Date of birth: 27 December 1973 (age 52)
- Place of birth: Trebišov, Czechoslovakia
- Height: 1.90 m (6 ft 3 in)
- Position: Forward

Senior career*
| Years | Team | Apps | (Gls) |
| 1993–1996 | 1. FC Tatran Prešov | | |
| 1996–1997 | Fortuna Düsseldorf | | |
| 1997 | → FK Austria Wien | | |
| 1998 | FC Carl Zeiss Jena | | |
| 1998–1999 | AC Omonia | | |
| 1999–2000 | Anagennisi Deryneia FC | | |
| 2000–2003 | 1. FC Tatran Prešov | | |
| 2002 | → FK Mesto Prievidza (loan) | | |
| 2003 | → ŠK Vegum Dolné Vestenice (loan) | | |
| 2003–2005 | ŠK Vegum Dolné Vestenice | | |
| 2005–2006 | SV Bad Ischl | | |
| 2006–2011 | FC Gossau | | |
| 2011–2012 | TJ Slovan Nitrianske Sučany | | |
- * Club domestic league appearances and goals

Róbert Kociš (born 27 December 1973) is a retired Slovak football striker.

After his career he began to work in Nováky Power Plant. He is father of two sons Adrián and Tomáš. He also manages amateur football sides in Prievidza District and surrounding regions, as he holds UEFA B licence.
