= Rudolf Matta =

Slovak footballer

Personal information
- Date of birth: 20 July 1968 (age 58)
- Place of birth: Prešov, Czechoslovakia
- Position: Defender

Senior career*
Years	Team	Apps	(Gls)
1985–1989	1. FC Tatran Prešov		
1989–1992	Sparta Prague		
1992–1993	Dukla Prague		
1993–1995	1. FC Tatran Prešov		
1998–2001	DAC Dunajská Streda		
2001–2003	KuPS		

International career
- Czechoslovakia U21
- * Club domestic league appearances and goals

Rudolf Matta (born 20 July 1968) is a retired Slovak football defender.
