= Noam Shoham =

Israeli footballer and manager

Noam Shoham נועם שוהם
Personal information
- Full name: Noam Shoham
- Date of birth: April 4, 1970 (age 56)
- Place of birth: Israel
- Position: Midfielder

Youth career
- 1976–1987: Maccabi Tel Aviv

Senior career*
Years	Team	Apps	(Gls)
1987–1998	Maccabi Tel Aviv	179	(7)
1988–1989	→ Maccabi Ramat Amidar (loan)		
1990–1991	→ Hapoel Ashkelon (loan)		
1998	Hapoel Ironi Rishon LeZion		
1998–2000	Maccabi Netanya		
2000	Hapoel Be'er Sheva		
2000–2001	Hapoel Kfar Saba		
2001–2002	Hapoel Tzafririrm Holon		
2002–2003	Maccabi Kafr Kanna		
2004–2005	Hapoel Marmorek		
2005	A.S. Eilat		
2005–2007	Hapoel Maxim Lod		
2007–2008	Hapoel Herzliya	22	(2)
2008	Maccabi Be'er Ya'akov	7	(1)
2008	→ Ironi Ramla (loan)	4	(0)
2009	Hapoel Herzliya	10	(0)
2010	Ortodoxim Lod	6	(0)

International career
1992	Israel	1	(0)

Managerial career
- 2010–2013: Hapoel Herzliya (assistant manager)
- 2013–2015: Hapoel Hod HaSharon
- 2015: Hapoel Herzliya
- 2015–2017: Hapoel Bik'at HaYarden
- 2017–2018: Beitar Kfar Saba
- 2018: F.C. Dimona
- 2018: Hapoel Ramat HaSharon
- 2018–2019: Hapoel Bik'at HaYarden
- 2019: Hapoel Ramat HaSharon
- 2020: Hapoel Umm al-Fahm
- 2021–2022: F.C. Tira
- 2022–2025: Hapoel Kfar Shalem
- 2025–: Maccabi Petah Tikva
- * Club domestic league appearances and goals

Noam Shoham (Hebrew: נועם שוהם) is a former Israeli international footballer and the manager of Hapoel Kfar Shalem.

== Honours ==
- Israeli Premier League (2):
  - 1991–92, 1994–95, 1995–96
- Israel State Cup (2):
  - 1994, 1996
- Toto Cup (1):
  - 1992–93
