= Miloslav Kordule =

Czech footballer

Personal information
- Date of birth: 23 June 1968 (age 58)
- Place of birth: Czechoslovakia
- Height: 1.83 m (6 ft 0 in)
- Position: Defender

Senior career*
Years	Team	Apps	(Gls)
1993–1998	Viktoria Žižkov	142	(16)
1999–2001	Jablonec	62	(2)
2001–2002	Hradec Králové	8	(0)
Total		212	(18)
- * Club domestic league appearances and goals

Miloslav Kordule (born 23 June 1968) is a Czech former football player. He made 212 appearances in the Gambrinus liga, scoring 18 goals.

== Honours ==
=== Club ===
FK Viktoria Žižkov

- Czech Cup: 1994
