= Richard Höger =

Slovak footballer and coach

Personal information
- Date of birth: 17 August 1972 (age 54)
- Place of birth: Prešov, Czechoslovakia
- Height: 1.82 m (6 ft 0 in)
- Position: Midfielder

Team information
- Current team: Zemplín Michalovce (assistant manager)

Senior career*
Years	Team	Apps	(Gls)
1991–1992	Tatran Prešov		
1992	Baník Prievidza		
1993–1996	Tatran Prešov	80	(8)
1996–1997	Slovan Bratislava	15	(2)
1997–1998	Bardejov	13	(2)
1998–1999	Slovan Bratislava	8	(1)
1999	Lokomotiv Nizhny Novgorod	7	(1)
2002–2003	Steel Trans Ličartovce		

Managerial career
- 2012–2014: Dukla Banská Bystrica (assistant)
- 2015–2016: Spartak Myjava (assistant)
- 2016–2018: Ružomberok (assistant)
- 2018–2019: Karviná (assistant)
- 2019–2020: AS Trenčín (assistant)
- 2020: Spartak Trnava (assistant)
- 2022–: Zemplín Michalovce (assistant)
- * Club domestic league appearances and goals

Richard Höger (born 17 August 1972) is a Slovak former footballer and coach. He is an assistant coach with Zemplín Michalovce.

== Honours ==
Slovan Bratislava

- Slovak Super Liga: 1998–99
- Slovak Cup: 1996–97, 1998–99
