= FC DAC 1904 Dunajská Streda =

Slovak football club

DAC 1904
- Full name: FK DAC 1904
- Founded: 1904; 122 years ago as Dunaszerdahelyi Atlétikai Club
- Ground: MOL Aréna; Dunajská Streda
- Capacity: 12,700
- Owner(s): Oszkár Világi 90% city of Dunajská Streda 10%
- President: Tibor Végh
- Manager: Robert Klauß
- League: Slovak First Football League
- 2025–26: Slovak First Football League, 2nd of 12
- Website: fcdac.sk//sk/
Home colours	Away colours

FC DAC 1904 is a Slovak professional football club based in Dunajská Streda which competes in the Slovak First Football League. In the 2007–08 season, they were the west group champions of the Slovak Third League. In the 2008–09 season, after merging with FC Senec, they entered the top division. The club is strongly associated with and supported by the Hungarian minority in Slovakia.

== History ==
DAC logo until 2021

The first organized sports club in Dunajská Streda (then Dunaszerdahely, Hungary), the Dunaszerdahelyi Atlétikai Club (Dunajská Streda Athletic Club (DAC)), was founded in 1904. At the time, football was a popular sport. The club survived both world wars and continued to 1953 when the team won the Bratislava district one A grade premiership. In 1968 and 1969, the team advanced in the Western Division of the third league before returning to the regional competition. In the 1977 to 1978 season, the team again entered the third league coming sixth. In the 1978 to 1979 competition, the team came seventh. In the 1979 to 1980 season, the team won their division and was promoted to the Slovak National League (SNL 1 – second level). DAC finally promoted to Czechoslovak First League in 1984–85 season. DAC was 3rd at this league in 1987–88 season and 4th in 1990–91 and 1992–93 seasons. They finished Slovak Superliga as 3rd in 1993–94 season. But, their form was lowered after this season and relegated to second level in 1997–98 season. They immediately returned to top level but relegated again in 1999–00 season. They relegated to 3rd level in 2006–07 season. They immediately returned to 2nd level but relegated again in 2008–09 season. They made successively two promotions and returned to top level in 2013. Since 2013, DAC has been affiliated with ŠK Senec. In 1987, DAC were the Slovak Cup (Slovenský Pohár) and Czechoslovak Cup (Československý Pohár) winners.

In 2025, UEFA did not let the club compete in the 2025–26 UEFA Conference League since one owner can have only one club in the competition. Világi, the club owner in 2025, had two clubs in the competition due to Győr's qualification in the 2024–25 Nemzeti Bajnokság I. On 1 July 2025, Világi said that the UEFA's decision is not righteous, therefore the club will turn to Court of Arbitration for Sport CAS.

=== Previous names ===
- 1908: DSE (Dunaszerdahelyi Sport Egylet)
- 1920: DAC (Dunaszerdahelyi Atlétikai Club)
- 1933: DTC (Dunaszerdahelyi Torna Club)
- 1942: DLE (Dunaszerdahelyi Labdarúgó Egyesület)
- 1948: Sokol
- 1953: Slavoj
- 1965: Jednota
- 1974: DAC
- 1993: FC DAC
- 1994: Marat – DAC
- 1994: 1.FC DAC – Gemer
- 1996: 1.FC DAC
- 2000: FK DAC 1904
- 2014: FC DAC 1904

=== 1980s ===
In the 1980–81 season, the team came eleventh. In the 1981–82 season, 26,089 attended games. The team won 15 games, lost 11 games and drew in 4 games. In the 1982–83 season, the team's star player Juraj Szikora could not participate in the competition. The team came second, four points behind the premier team, Banská Bystrica. In the 1983–84 season, the team came second, four points behind Petržalka. 8,136 patrons attended a home game where the team beat Petržalka three points to zero. Ladislav Tóth scored twenty-two points becoming the highest goal scorer of the League for that season. In the 1984–85 season, Karol Pecze coached the team. 10,000 patrons attended the last home gain against Nitra. Ladislav Tóth again scored twenty-two points and won the golden shoe. In the 1985–86 season, the team made its debut in the Czechoslovak First League. The team reaches the quarter-finals and comes eleventh. In the 1986–87 season, the team came fourth in the Slovak League. They won both the Slovak and the Czechoslovak cups. In the 1987 to 1988 season, the team entered the European Cup. In the preliminary round, DAC had two wins against AEL Limassol (Cyprus),1–0 and 5–1. The team's campaign ended in the first round with a defeat to Young Boys Bern (2–1 and 1–3). In the Slovak national league, the team came third. In the 1988–89 season, the team had a 6–0 victory over Öster of Sweden in the first round of the UEFA Cup. In the second round, the team played Bayern Munich. 15,572 patrons attended that game. The team came sixth in the Slovak league. In the 1989–90 season, Anton Dragúň led the team to fourteenth place.

=== 1990s ===
In the 1990–91 season, Juraj Szikora coached the team and they came fourth. In the 1991–92 season, the team won the Intertoto Cup in group eight. After twelve days, Szikora was replaced by Vladimír Hrivnák. The team came ninth. In the 1992–93 season, the last year of the Slovak national league, the team was coached by Dušan Radolský. In the 1993–94 season, the first year of the Slovak League, the team, coached by Ladislav Škorpil scores 62 times and comes third. Pavol Diňa is the top scorer with 19 goals. In the UEFA Cup, DAC played Casino Salzburg who defeat them twice with a score zero to two in the first round. In the 1994–95 season, with coach Jozef Valovič, the team comes fourth. In the 1995–96 season, four coaches: Jozef Valovič, Anton Grajcár, Juraj Szikora, and Jozef Adamec, led the team to tenth place from a field of twelve. In the 1996–97 season, the team, coached by Jozef Adamec came fourteenth out of sixteen. In the 1997–98 season, after thirteen years, DAC fell from the Slovak League. Ladislav Škorpil and Dušan Liba coached the team which won five games of thirty and came last out of sixteen teams. In the 1998–99 season, Vladimír Rusnák coached the team and they won the second league. In the 1990–00 season, the first league was reorganized. DAC cam fourteenth in the first league and was relegated to the second league again. The coaches in this season were Viliam Ilko, Anton Grajcár, and Ladislav Kuna.

=== 2000s ===
In the 2000–01 season, DAC was coached by Ladislav Kuna and came fifth in the second league. In 2001–02, the coach, Ladislav Hudec, was replaced after nine rounds by Juraj Szikora. The team came ninth in the second league. In the 2002–03 season, Tibor Szaban coached the team. After half the rounds, the team was three points from dropping to a lower league. Szaban was then replaced by Milan Albrecht. DAC won the next ten games and came eighth. In 2003–04, Juraj Szikora and Dušan Liba were the coaches. The team won nine of fifteen games. At this point, the team was engaged by Iranian sponsors. Robert Pflug became the coach and the team won thirty points. The 2004–05 season begins with Štefan Horný. After fifteen rounds he is replaced by Peter Fieber who was once a player in the team. DAC came eighth. The best game was against Slovan in front of 2,890 fans where DAC won two points to zero. In 2005–06, the Slovak League was again reorganized and DAC dropped from the second league. A series of five coaches (Ladislav Kuna, Peter Fieber, Anton Grajcár, Štefan Zaťko, and Tibor Mičinec) allowed the team twelfth place in their competition. In the 2006–07 season, the first Slovak League was renamed the Corgoň Liga and the second league became the first league in which DAC played the season. Milan Albrecht coaches for rounds one to six and then is replaced by Robert Pflug. In 2007–08, DAC won the second league competition (2. liga) but this was not a nationwide competition. The coaches were Tibor Meszlényi, Peter Fieber and assistant Július Šimon.

== Supporters and rivalries ==
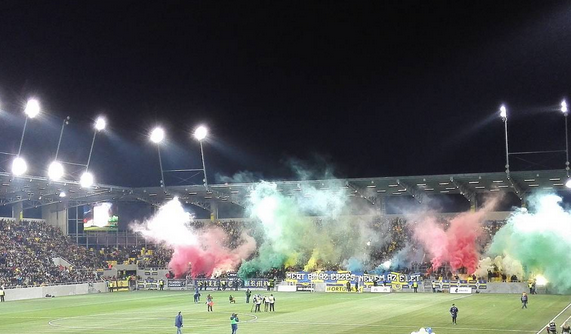
DAC fans in match against AS Trenčín, on 19 November 2016

FC DAC 1904 Dunajská Streda is a football club based in southern Slovakia near the Hungarian border, in a town with a historically large ethnic Hungarian population. The club’s supporters, known as YBS (Yellow Blue Supporters), are closely associated with this Hungarian identity. They typically display banners stating "Dunaszerdahely," the Hungarian name of the town, and sing in Hungarian, including the Hungarian national anthem, Himnusz, or the song Nélküled, often performed before kick-off. The Hungarian tricolour is regularly displayed in the stands of the MOL Aréna. YBS exclude Slovak members and have maintained friendly relations with fans of Ferencváros TC, while their main domestic rivals are Slovan Bratislava and Spartak Trnava.

These cultural expressions have occasionally led to clashes with other Slovak clubs and attracted the attention of nationalist politicians. In 2019, Slovak National Party MP Dušan Tittel promoted legislation making it an offence to sing foreign national anthems, explicitly referencing DAC fans' singing of the Hungarian anthem. Club president Oszkár Világi and spokesman Krisztián Nagy affirmed that the club would continue to support these customs, even if fines were imposed. During a 12 April 2025 match against DAC, Slovan Bratislava fans displayed overtly nationalist and anti-Hungarian behaviour. They unfurled a banner depicting a balaclava-clad Slovan ultra "teaching a lesson" to children wearing DAC and Ferencvárosi TC kits, accompanied by a blackboard and inscriptions mocking Hungary and asserting Slovak dominance. Anti-Hungarian chants were a constant feature, and the timing of the match coincided with a historic date commemorating the deportation of ethnic Hungarians from Slovakia in 1947. After the match, DAC released a trilingual statement condemning the Slovan fans' tifo as inappropriate, offensive, and divisive, noting that it targeted ethnic, cultural, and national identities. The club affirmed that while rivalry is part of football, mocking identity or ethnicity is unacceptable. DAC announced it would file an official complaint with the Slovak Football Association and urged all stakeholders to consider the values promoted in Slovak football, emphasising that exclusion has no place in the modern game. The statement included the hashtag #HungarianNotForeign, a hashtag supporting the position of ethnic Hungarians as a part of Slovak society.

The club has benefited from financial backing linked to Hungary, including infrastructural support and strategic partnerships with Hungarian companies, most prominently MOL. Owner Oszkár Világi, a local businessman with close ties to the Hungarian government and Viktor Orbán, has overseen the development of the club’s facilities, including the MOL Arena and a modern youth academy, while maintaining a trilingual and internationally diverse playing and technical staff.

== Affiliated club ==
The following club is affiliated with DAC:

- (Slovakia) ŠTK 1914 Šamorín (2019–)

== Honours ==
=== Domestic ===
Slovakia

- Slovak Super Liga (1993–)
  - Runners-up (5): 2018–19, 2020–21, 2022–23, 2023–24, 2025–26
- Slovak Cup (1961–)
  - Winners (1): 1987
  - Runners-up (2): 1992–93, 1994–95
- Slovak Second Division (1993–)
  - Winners (2): 1998–99, 2012–13

Czechoslovakia

- Czechoslovak Cup (1961–93)
  - Winners (1): 1987
- 1.SNL (1st Slovak National League) (1969–93)
  - Winners (1): 1984–85

== Transfers ==
DAC have produced numerous players who have gone on to represent the Slovak national football team. Over the last periods there has been a steady increase of young players leaving Dunajská Streda after a few years of first team football and moving on to play football in leagues of a higher standard, with the German Bundesliga (András Schäfer to Union Berlin in 2022), Czech First League (Tibor Jančula to Žižkov in 1993, Léonard Kweuke to Sparta in 2010, Dzon Delarge to Liberec in 2012, Erik Pačinda to Plzeň in 2019), Danish Superliga (Pavol Šafranko to Aalborg in 2017, Marko Divković to Brøndby IF in 2022), Austrian Bundesliga (Ján Novota to Rapid Wien in 2011), Polish Ekstraklasa (Tomáš Huk (2019) and Kristopher Vida (2020) to Piast Gliwice, Ľubomír Šatka to Lech Poznań in 2019), American Major League Soccer (Matej Oravec to Philadelphia Union in 2020), Scottish Premiership (Vakoun Issouf Bayo to Celtic F.C. in 2019). The top transfer was agreed in 2023 when forward Nikola Krstović joined Italian US Lecce for a fee of €4.5 million. + additional €3.6million from his next transfer to Atalanta BC in 2025.

=== Record departures ===
Rank	Player	To	Fee	Year
1.	(Hungary) Damir Redzic	(Austria) RB Salzburg	€5 million	2026
2.	(Montenegro) Nikola Krstović	(Italy) US Lecce	€4.5 million*	2023
3.	(The Gambia) Mahmudu Bajo	(Serbia) Red Star Belgrade	€3.5 million	2025
4.	(Ivory Coast) Vakoun Issouf Bayo	(Scotland) Celtic Glasgow	€2.2 million	2019
5.	(Venezuela) Eric Ramírez	(Ukraine) FC Dynamo Kyiv	€1.8 million	2021
6.	(Slovakia) Matej Oravec	(United States) Philadelphia Union	€1 million	2020
6.	(Hungary) András Schäfer	(Germany) Union Berlin	€1 million*	2022
6.	(Croatia) Marko Divković	(Denmark) Brøndby IF	€1 million	2022
7.	(Hungary) Levente Bősze	(Italy) Como 1907	€0.9 million	2026
8.	(Slovakia) Ľubomír Šatka	(Poland) Lech Poznań	€0.75 million	2019
9.	(Cameroon) Léonard Kweuke	(Czech Republic) Sparta Prague	€0.7 million	2010
9.	(Hungary) Kristopher Vida	(Poland) Piast Gliwice	€0.7 million*	2020

=== Record arrivals ===
Rank	Player	From	Fee	Year
1.	(Ivory Coast) Julien Bationo	(Armenia) FC Alashkert	€600,000	2025
2.	(Venezuela) Eric Ramírez	(Czech Republic) MFK Karviná	€500,000*	2019
2.	(Slovakia) Dominik Kružliak	(Slovakia) MFK Ružomberok	€500,000	2019
2.	(Slovenia) Žan Trontelj	(Ukraine) FC Zorya Luhansk	€500,000	2026
3.	(Montenegro) Nikola Krstović	(Serbia) Red Star	€400,000	2021
3.	(Serbia) Uroš Kabić	(Serbia) OFK Beograd	€400,000	2026
4.	(Croatia) Andrija Balić	(Italy) Udinese Calcio	€350,000*	2020
4.	(The Gambia) Mahmudu Bajo	(Slovakia) Podbrezová	€350,000	2024
5.	(Croatia) Ivan Dolček	(Croatia) HNK Hajduk Split	€325,000	2024
6.	(Ghana) Prince Owusu	(Azerbaijan) Qabala İK	€250,000	2026
7.	(Serbia) Aleksandar Popović	(Serbia) FK Partizan	€210,000	2023

*-unofficial fee

== Sponsorship ==
Period	Kit manufacturer	Shirt sponsor
????–83	none	none
1983–85	none	DAC
1985–91	Adidas	none
1991–92	Adidas	SPECTRUM
1992–93	Adidas	none
1993–94	Adidas	Saturn
1994–95	Puma	Sulák
1995–96	Adidas	gemer
1996–97	Adidas	DAC
1997–98	Adidas	none
1998–99	Adidas	Kabát
1999–06	NIKE	none
2006–07	Erreà	THERMAL PARK
2007–08	hummel	My City DUBAI
2008–10	Adidas	Abu Dhabi
2010–11	Adidas	Regin
2011–12	Adidas	NEGIN
2012–14	Adidas	none
2014–2017	Adidas	Kukkonia
2017–	macron	Kukkonia

=== Club partners ===
- Kukkonia
- MOL
- ENARGO
- St. Nicolaus
- Tatra Billing
- OTP Bank
- FCC Environment
- SAM
- Strabag

== Results ==
=== League and Cup history ===
Slovak League only (1993–present)

Season	Division (Name)	Pos./Teams	Pl.	W	D	L	GS	GA	P	Slovak Cup	Europe		Top Scorer (Goals)
1993–94	1st (Mars Superliga)	3/(12)	32	13	10	9	62	47	36	Semi-finals	UC	1.R ( (Austria) Casino Salzburg)	(Slovakia) Pavol Diňa (19)
1994–95	1st (Mars Superliga)	4/(12)	32	13	7	12	41	42	46	Runners-up			(Slovakia) Jozef Ürge (4) (Slovakia) Vladimír Weiss (4) (Slovakia) Tibor Zsákovics (4) (Slovakia) Zsolt Kianek (4)
1995–96	1st (Mars Superliga)	10/(12)	32	10	3	19	41	76	33	2nd round			(Slovakia) Eugen Bari (8)
1996–97	1st (Mars Superliga)	14/(16)	30	9	7	14	29	45	34	Quarter-finals			(Slovakia) Milan Rimanovský (9)
1997–98	1st (Mars Superliga)	16/(16)	30	5	6	19	26	51	21	1st round			(Czech Republic) Jaroslav Mašek (4)
1998–99	2nd (1. Liga)	1/(16)	34	21	6	7	62	29	69	2nd round			(Slovakia) Mikuláš Radványi (20)
1999–00	1st (Mars Superliga)	14/(16)	30	6	9	15	24	42	27	Quarter-finals			(Slovakia) Mikuláš Radványi (6) (Slovakia) Július Šimon (6)
2000–01	2nd (1. Liga)	5/(18)	34	16	7	11	43	41	55	1st round			(Slovakia) Ladislav Suchánek (14)
2001–02	2nd (1. Liga)	8/(16)	30	11	10	9	42	38	43	1st round			(Slovakia) Vladimír Veselý (7)
2002–03	2nd (1. Liga)	8/(16)	30	11	8	11	39	40	41	1st round			(Slovakia) Miroslav Kozák (9)
2003–04	2nd (1. Liga)	11/(16)	30	11	6	13	36	44	39	1st round			(Slovakia) Peter Bognár (9)
2004–05	2nd (1. Liga)	6/(16)	30	12	6	12	33	45	42	1st round			(Slovakia) Peter Bognár (5)
2005–06	2nd (1. Liga)	12/(16)	30	7	6	17	27	51	27	1st round			(Slovakia) Lukáš Rohovský (4)
2006–07	2nd (1. Liga)	9/(12)	36	9	12	15	32	46	39	1st round			(Niger) Siradji Sani (6)
2007–08	3rd (2.Liga)	1/(16)	30	18	3	8	54	29	57	3rd round			(Slovakia) Ladislav Belkovics (11)
2008–09	1st (Corgoň Liga)	9/(12)	33	9	9	15	32	59	36	Quarter-finals			(Cameroon) Leonard Kweuke (11)
2009–10	1st (Corgoň Liga)	10/(12)	33	7	12	14	28	47	33	Semi-finals			(Netherlands) Samuel Koejoe (7)
2010–11	1st (Corgoň Liga)	9/(12)	33	9	9	15	24	39	36	2nd round			(Slovakia) Zoltán Harsányi (4)
2011–12	1st (Corgoň Liga)	12/(12)	33	5	1	27	21	63	16	2nd round			(Republic of the Congo) John Delarge (8)
2012–13	2nd (2. Liga)	1/(12)	33	19	8	6	41	26	65	2nd round			(Slovakia) Stanislav Velický (9)
2013–14	1st (Corgoň Liga)	11/(12)	33	8	8	17	29	57	26^{1}	3rd round			(Slovakia) Ákos Szarka (4)
2014–15	1st (Fortuna Liga)	8/(12)	33	9	12	12	32	44	39	Semi-finals			(Slovakia) Ákos Szarka (5)
2015–16	1st (Fortuna Liga)	7/(12)	33	12	7	14	38	42	43	Quarter-finals			(Slovakia) Erik Pačinda (10)
2016–17	1st (Fortuna Liga)	7/(12)	30	10	12	8	37	34	42	Quarter-finals			(Slovakia) Erik Pačinda (8)
2017–18	1st (Fortuna Liga)	3/(12)	32	16	9	7	46	32	57	Quarter-finals			(Slovakia) Erik Pačinda (10)
2018–19	1st (Fortuna Liga)	2/(12)	32	19	6	7	63	37	63	1/8 finals	EL	2.QR ( (Belarus) Dinamo Minsk)	(Hungary) Kristopher Vida (11)
2019–20	1st (Fortuna Liga)	3/(12)	27	15	5	7	42	28	50	Semi-Finals	EL	2.QR ( (Greece) Atromitos)	(Hungary) Zsolt Kalmár (9)
2020–21	1st (Fortuna Liga)	2/(12)	32	19	8	5	66	38	65	Quarter-finals	EL	3.QR ( (Austria) LASK)	(Venezuela) Eric Ramírez (16)
2021–22	1st (Fortuna Liga)	4/(12)	32	12	10	10	39	37	46	3rd Round	ECL	2.QR ( (Serbia) FK Partizan)	(Montenegro) Nikola Krstović (7)
2022–23	1st (Fortuna Liga)	2/(12)	32	20	7	5	54	29	67	4th Round	ECL	3.QR ( (Romania) FCSB)	(Montenegro) Nikola Krstović (18)
2023–24	1st (Niké Liga)	2/(12)	32	16	10	6	49	32	58	Quarter-finals	ECL	1.QR ( (Georgia (country)) Dila Gori)	(Slovakia) Matej Trusa (12)
2024–25	1st (Niké Liga)	4/(12)	32	13	12	7	48	34	51	Round of 16	ECL	1.QR ( (Armenia) Zira FK)	(Syria) Ammar Ramadan (11)
2025–26	1st (Niké Liga)	2/(12)	32	17	7	8	55	34	58	Quarter-finals	ECL	Disqualified	(Syria) Ammar Ramadan (11)

^{1} Deducted six points at the end of the season due to match-fixing.

=== European competition history ===
==== UEFA-administered ====
Season	Competition	Round	Country	Club	Home	Away	Agg.
1987–88	Cup Winners' Cup	Q	(Cyprus)	AEL Limassol	1–0	5–1	6–1
1987–88	Cup Winners' Cup	1.R	(Switzerland)	Young Boys	2–1	1–3	3–4
1988–89	UEFA Cup	1.R	(Sweden)	Östers IF	0–2	6–0	6–2
1988–89	UEFA Cup	2.R	(Germany)	Bayern Munich	1–3	0–2	1–5
1993–94	UEFA Cup	1.R	(Austria)	Casino Salzburg	0–2	0–2	0–4
2018–19	UEFA Europa League	1QR	(Georgia (country))	Dinamo Tbilisi	1–1	2–1	3–2
2018–19	UEFA Europa League	2QR	(Belarus)	Dinamo Minsk	1–3	1–4	2–7
2019–20	UEFA Europa League	1QR	(Poland)	Cracovia	1–1	2–2 (a.e.t)	3–3 (a)
2019–20	UEFA Europa League	2QR	(Greece)	Atromitos	1–2	2–3	3–5
2020–21	UEFA Europa League	1QR	(Iceland)	FH	—N/a	2–0	—N/a
2020–21	UEFA Europa League	2QR	(Czech Republic)	Jablonec	5–3 (a.e.t)	—N/a	—N/a
2020–21	UEFA Europa League	3QR	(Austria)	LASK	—N/a	0–7	—N/a
2021–22	UEFA Europa Conference League	2QR	(Serbia)	Partizan	0–2	0–1	0–3
2022–23	UEFA Europa Conference League	1QR	(Northern Ireland)	Cliftonville	2–1	3–0	5–1
2022–23	UEFA Europa Conference League	2QR	(Faroe Islands)	Víkingur Gøta	2–0	2–0	4–0
2022–23	UEFA Europa Conference League	3QR	(Romania)	FCSB	0–1	0–1	0–2
2023–24	UEFA Europa Conference League	1QR	(Georgia (country))	Dila Gori	2–1	0–2	2–3
2024–25	UEFA Conference League	2QR	(Azerbaijan)	Zira	1–2	0–4	1–6
2026–27	UEFA Conference League	2QR	(Bosnia and Herzegovina)	Velež Mostar	1–0	3-0	4-0
2026–27	UEFA Conference League	3QR	(Netherlands)	FC Twente	3–3	0-6	3-9

==== Not UEFA-administered ====
Season	Competition	Round	Country	Club	Home	Away
1987	Intertoto Cup	Group 4	(Hungary)	FC Tatabánya	0–1	1–6
1987	Intertoto Cup	Group 4	(Switzerland)	AC Bellinzona	4–0	0–2
1987	Intertoto Cup	Group 4	(Denmark)	Næstved	2–2	2–3
1988	Intertoto Cup	Group 5	(Sweden)	IFK Norrköping	5–1	0–1
1988	Intertoto Cup	Group 5	(Switzerland)	Young Boys	3–1	1–5
1988	Intertoto Cup	Group 5	(Hungary)	Szombathelyi Haladás	3–0	0–0
1991	Intertoto Cup	Group 8	(Romania)	FC Rapid București	3–0	0–1
1991	Intertoto Cup	Group 8	(Bulgaria)	Botev Plovdiv	4–1	3–1
1992	Mitropa Cup	1.R	(Hungary)	BVSC Budapest		0–0 (5–6)(p)
1993	Intertoto Cup	Group 4	(Sweden)	Malmö FF	0–0	
1993	Intertoto Cup	Group 4	(Germany)	Bayer Uerdingen		2–0
1993	Intertoto Cup	Group 4	(Denmark)	OB Odense	0–3	
1993	Intertoto Cup	Group 4	(Hungary)	Videoton		1–7
1994	Intertoto Cup	Group 7	(Sweden)	Trelleborg	2–0	
1994	Intertoto Cup	Group 7	(Switzerland)	Grasshoppers		0–3
1994	Intertoto Cup	Group 7	(Germany)	MSV Duisburg	0–1	
1994	Intertoto Cup	Group 7	(Denmark)	Aalborg BK		1–3

== Current squad ==
As of 17 September 2026

Note: Flags indicate national team as defined under FIFA eligibility rules; some limited exceptions apply. Players may hold more than one non-FIFA nationality.

No.	Pos.	Nation	Player
1	GK	BRA	Filipe
7	FW	SRB	Uroš Kabić
9	FW	AUT	Andreas Gruber
10	FW	SYR	Ammar Ramadan
11	FW	SEN	Abdoulaye Gueye
15	DF	PAN	Joseph Pacheco
16	FW	SVK	Pavol Šafranko
17	MF	CIV	Julien Eymard Bationo
18	DF	NOR	Simen Juklerød
19	FW	SEN	Alioune Sylla
21	GK	AUT	Phillip Živanović
22	DF	GEO	Tsotne Kapanadze
23	DF	SLO	Žan Trontelj
26	DF	SVK	Filip Blažek (vice-captain)
27	MF	SEN	Fallou Diongue

No.	Pos.	Nation	Player
29	FW	GEO	Giorgi Gagua
30	FW	GHA	Prince Owusu
31	GK	SLO	Aljaž Ivačič
33	DF	UKR	Taras Kacharaba (captain)
36	MF	SVK	Nathan Udvaros
38	MF	SVK	Martin Jenčuš
39	MF	SVK	Adam Lábo
40	DF	SVK	Bálint Csóka
44	MF	TOG	Samsondin Ouro
46	FW	SVK	Matej Trusa
49	DF	BRA	Rhyan Modesto
68	MF	HUN	Máté Tuboly
81	DF	SLO	Klemen Nemanič
90	GK	SVK	Attila Németh

For recent transfers, see List of Slovak football transfers summer 2026

=== Retired numbers ===
12 – The 12th man (reserved for the club supporters)

=== Out on loan ===
Note: Flags indicate national team as defined under FIFA eligibility rules; some limited exceptions apply. Players may hold more than one non-FIFA nationality.

No.	Pos.	Nation	Player
5	MF	SVK	Karol Blaško (on loan at Šamorín)
14	FW	GAM	Pa Assan Corr (on loan at Dukla Prague)

No.	Pos.	Nation	Player
20	DF	BFA	Rachid Barro (on loan at Šamorín)
99	FW	SLO	Nino Kukovec (on loan at Csíkszereda)

== Staff ==
=== Technical staff ===
Position	Staff
Manager	(Germany) Robert Klauß
Assistant Manager	(Germany) Thomas Kraus
Coach	(Slovakia) Ladislav Kubalík
Head of Performance	(Netherlands) Björn Rekelhof
Fitness Coach	(Uruguay) Cristian Machín
Fitness Coach	(Uruguay) Facundo Arriola
Goalkeeper Coach	(Slovakia) Pavol Hrnčiarik
Physiotherapist	(Slovakia) Márton Domsitz
Physiotherapist	(Slovakia) Ladislav Puha
Physiotherapist	(Slovakia) Adam Báčkai
Video Analyst	(Slovakia) Dominik Schmitt

=== Management ===
Position	Staff
Owner	(Slovakia) (Hungary) Oszkár Világi
Director	(Belgium) Jan van Daele
Vice-President	(Slovakia) Barnabáš Antal
Team Manager	(Slovakia) Dušan Chytil
Sport Director	(Belgium) Jan-Pieter Martens
Head Scout	(Slovakia) (Hungary) Roland Kovács

== Player records ==
=== Most goals ===
#	Nat.	Name	Goals
1	(Czechoslovakia)	Ladislav Tóth	74
2	(Slovakia)	Mikuláš Radványi	60
3	(Slovakia)	Pavol Diňa	49
4	(Hungary)	Zsolt Kalmár	43
5	(Syria)	**Ammar Ramadan**	35
6	(Slovakia)	Erik Pačinda	32
7	(Hungary)	Kristopher Vida	29
7	(Montenegro)	Nikola Krstović	29
7	(Slovakia)	**Matej Trusa**	29
8	(Czechoslovakia)	Tibor Mičinec	27
9	(Slovakia)	Július Šimon	26
10	(Croatia)	Marko Divković	25

Players whose name is listed in bold are still active.

==== Slovak League Top Goalscorer ====
Slovak League Top scorer since 1993–94

Year	Winner	G
1994–95	(Slovakia) Pavol Diňa	19
2022–23	(Montenegro) Nikola Krstović	18

^{1}Shared award

== Notable players ==
Had international caps for their respective countries. Players whose name is listed in bold represented their countries while playing for DAC.

Past (and present) players who are the subjects of Wikipedia articles can be found here.

- (Slovakia) Ladislav Almási
- (Republic of the Congo) **Yhoan Andzouana**
- (Iran) Farzad Ashoubi
- (North Macedonia) Aleksandar Bajevski
- (The Gambia) **Mahmudu Bajo**
- (Hungary) Norbert Balogh
- (Slovakia) Kristián Bari
- (Ivory Coast) **Vakoun Issouf Bayo**
- (Slovakia) László Bénes
- (Lithuania) **Ričardas Beniušis**
- (Panama) **César Blackman**
- (Slovakia) Balázs Borbély
- (Latvia) **Andrejs Ciganiks**
- (Gabon) Arsène Copa
- (Hungary) **Márk Csinger**
- (Czechoslovakia) Jaroslav Červeňan
- (Panama) **Erick Davis**
- (Republic of the Congo) Dzon Delarge
- (Senegal) Pape Cheikh Diop
- (Slovakia) **Pavol Diňa**
- (Montenegro) **Viktor Đukanović**
- (Slovakia) Ján Ďurica
- (Cameroon) Jacques Elong Elong
- (Czechoslovakia) (Slovakia) **Peter Fieber**
- (Slovakia) Michal Filo
- (Slovakia) Branislav Fodrek
- (North Macedonia) Enis Fazlagić
- (Serbia) Željko Gavrić
- (Slovakia) Roman Gergel
- (Czechoslovakia) Koloman Gögh
- (Slovakia) Marián Had
- (Hungary) **János Hahn**
- (North Macedonia) Ilami Halimi
- (Djibouti) **Ismail Hassan**
- (Slovakia) Christián Herc
- (Slovakia) **Tomáš Huk**
- (Slovakia) Tibor Jančula
- (Czechoslovakia) Ladislav Józsa
- (Estonia) Oliver Jürgens
- (Slovakia) Miroslav Káčer
- (Hungary) **Zsolt Kalmár**
- (Czechoslovakia) **Ján Kapko**
- (Ukraine) Ihor Kharatin
- (Slovakia) Rastislav Kostka
- (Slovakia) Pavel Kováč
- (Montenegro) **Nikola Krstović**
- (Slovakia) Dominik Kružliak
- (Cameroon) Léonard Kweuke
- (Cameroon) Didier Lamkel Zé
- (Austria) Rolf Landerl
- (Slovakia) Peter Lérant
- (Slovakia) Štefan Maixner
- (Lithuania) Egidijus Majus
- (Slovakia) Tomáš Malec
- (Slovakia) Ľubomír Michalík
- (Czechoslovakia) Tibor Mičinec
- (Bosnia and Herzegovina) Nikola Mikelini
- (Slovakia) Krisztián Németh
- (Hungary) Krisztián Németh
- (Moldova) **Ion Nicolaescu**
- (The Gambia) **Sainey Njie**
- (Bosnia and Herzegovina) Staniša Nikolić
- (Slovakia) Sebastian Nebyla
- (Slovakia) Ján Novota
- (Slovakia) Branislav Obžera
- (Slovakia) **Erik Pačinda**
- (Philippines) Stephan Palla
- (Republic of the Congo) **Yves Pambou**
- (Iran) Mohammad Parvin
- (Slovakia) Attila Pinte
- (Hungary) Attila Pintér
- (Slovakia) Jozef Pisár
- (Slovakia) Martin Polaček
- (Serbia) Aleksandar Popović
- (Bosnia and Herzegovina) Ilija Prodanović
- (Venezuela) **Eric Ramírez**
- (Syria) **Ammar Ramadan**
- (Hungary) **Damir Redzic**
- (Hungary) Csaba Regedei
- (Greece) Spyros Risvanis
- (Venezuela) Andrés Romero
- (Latvia) **Valērijs Šabala**
- (Slovakia) (Hungary) Zoltán Harsányi
- (Slovakia) Pavol Šafranko
- (Slovakia) Kornel Saláta
- (Niger) Siradji Sani
- (Austria) Yüksel Sariyar
- (Hungary) **András Schäfer**
- (Slovakia) Pavol Sedlák
- (Bosnia and Herzegovina) Ivan Sesar
- (Slovakia) **Ľubomír Šatka**
- (Slovakia) Július Šimon
- (Panama) **Alfredo Stephens**
- (Slovakia) **Otto Szabó**
- (Poland) Grzegorz Szamotulski
- (Czechoslovakia) Juraj Szikora
- (Ukraine) Taras Kacharaba
- (North Macedonia) Darko Tofiloski
- (Hungary) **Máté Vida**
- (Slovakia) (Czechoslovakia) Vladimír Weiss

== Former head coaches ==
- (Czechoslovakia) Vojtech Gödölle (1977–78)
- (Czechoslovakia) Vladimír Hrivnák (1978–81)
- (Czechoslovakia) Štefan Jačiansky (1981)
- (Czechoslovakia) Anton Richtárik (1982)
- (Czechoslovakia) Juraj Szikora (1982–84)
- (Czechoslovakia) Karol Pecze (1984–89)
- (Czechoslovakia) Anton Dragúň (1989–90)
- (Czechoslovakia) Juraj Szikora (1990–91)
- (Czechoslovakia) Vladimír Hrivnák (1991–92)
- (Slovakia) Dusan Radolsky (1 Jul 1992 – 30 Jun 1993)
- (Czech Republic) Ladislav Škorpil (1993–94)
- (Slovakia) Jozef Valovič (1994–95)
- (Slovakia) Anton Grajcár (caretaker) (1995)
- (Slovakia) Juraj Szikora (1995–96)
- (Slovakia) Jozef Adamec (1996–97)
- (Czech Republic) Ladislav Škorpil (1997–98)
- (Slovakia) Dušan Liba (1998)
- (Slovakia) Vladimír Rusnák (1998–99)
- (Slovakia) Viliam Ilko (1999)
- (Slovakia) Anton Grajcár (caretaker) (1999)
- (Slovakia) Ladislav Kuna (1999 – 30 Nov 2000)
- (Slovakia) Ladislav Hudec (2001)
- (Slovakia) Juraj Szikora (2001–02)
- (Slovakia) Tibor Szaban (2002)
- (Slovakia) Milan Albrecht (2003)
- (Slovakia) Juraj Szikora (2003)
- (Slovakia) Dušan Liba (2003)
- (Austria) Robert Pflug (1 Jan 2004 – 31 May 2004)
- (Slovakia) Stefan Horny (2004–05)
- (Slovakia) Ladislav Kuna (2005)
- (Slovakia) Peter Fieber (2005)
- (Slovakia) Štefan Zaťko (2005–06)
- (Slovakia) Tibor Mičinec (2006)
- (Slovakia) Milan Albrecht (2006)
- (Austria) Robert Pflug (2006–07)
- (Iran) Asghar Sharafi (1 Jul 2007 – 12 May 2008)
- (Slovakia) Peter Fieber (2008)
- (Croatia) Milan Đuričić (1 Jul 2008 – 17 Aug 2008)
- (Slovakia) Michal Kuruc (14 Aug 2008 – 24 Aug 2008) (car)
- (Germany) Werner Lorant (29 Aug 2008 – 22 Apr 2009)
- (Croatia) Zlatko Kranjčar (22 Apr 2009 – 30 Jun 2009)
- (Austria) Kurt Garger (4 Jul 2009 – 10 May 2010)
- (Slovakia) Mikuláš Radványi (10 May 2010 – 30 Jun 2011)
- (Slovakia) Štefan Horný (1 Jul 2011 – 6 Aug 2011)
- (Slovakia) Krisztián Németh (8 Aug 2011 – 25 Mar 2012)
- (Germany) Werner Lorant (26 Mar 2012 – 7 Apr 2012)
- (Slovakia) Mikuláš Radványi (1 Jun 2012 – 17 Jan 2015)
- (Croatia) Tomislav Marić (17 Jan 2015 – 30 Jun 2016)
- (Slovakia) Krisztián Németh (23 May 2016 – 20 Oct 2016)
- (Romania) Csaba László (20 Oct 2016 – 6 Jun 2017)
- (Italy) Marco Rossi (11 Jun 2017 – 20 Jun 2018)
- (Germany) Peter Hyballa (16 Jul 2018 – 3 Jan 2020)
- (Portugal) Hélder (5 Jan 2020 – 31 May 2020)
- (Germany) Bernd Storck (1 Jun 2020 – 21 Apr 2021)
- (Hungary) Antal Németh (22 Apr 2021 – 10 Nov 2021)
- (Portugal) João Janeiro (11 Nov 2021 – 31 May 2022)
- (Slovakia) Adrián Guľa (15 June 2022 – 18 Nov 2023)
- (Spain) Xisco Muñoz (18 Nov 2023 – 27 Nov 2024)
- (Slovakia) Branislav Fodrek (27 Nov 2024 – 3 June 2026)
- (Germany) Robert Klauß (5 June 2026 – present)
