= Riccardo Maspero =

Italian former footballer (born 1970)

Personal information
- Date of birth: 19 February 1970 (age 56)
- Place of birth: Lodi, Italy
- Height: 1.75 m (5 ft 9 in)
- Position: Midfielder

Youth career
- Fanfulla

Senior career*
Years	Team	Apps	(Gls)
1985–1987	Varese	39	(0)
1988–1994	Cremonese	157	(15)
1994–1995	Sampdoria	21	(4)
1995–1997	Cremonese	70	(14)
1997	→ Lecce (loan)	6	(0)
1997–1998	Vicenza	7	(0)
1998–1999	Perugia	10	(1)
1999	→ Reggiana (loan)	14	(0)
1999–2000	Lecce	1	(0)
2000–2003	Torino	62	(10)
2003–2004	Fiorentina	26	(0)
2005–2007	Fanfulla	74	(17)
Total		487	(61)

International career
1989–1990	Italy U-21	2	(0)

Managerial career
- 2013–2014: Ciliverghe di Mazzano
- 2014–2015: Pavia
- 2015: Mantova
- 2018: Pro Piacenza
- 2019: Giana Erminio
- 2021–2022: Franciacorta
- * Club domestic league appearances and goals

Riccardo Maspero (born 19 February 1970) is an Italian former footballer who played as an attacking midfielder, and now a head coach.

== Club career ==
Maspero's career came to prominence most notably with his time at then-Serie A club Cremonese, with whom he started playing professionally and played in two one-year spells in the Italian top flight. He came into his own during the promotion season of 1992–93 and impressed greatly in a side coached by Luigi Simoni which finished 10th in Serie A during the 1993–94 season. He established a reputation as a gifted playmaker.

A move to Sampdoria followed, but he failed to make his mark and returned to Cremonese after one season. Despite outstanding form and a healthy return of goals from midfield, he was unable to prevent successive relegations.

His career declined after a move to Lecce in 1997, where he found opportunities limited; the club were relegated to Serie B at the end of the season. He was loaned to Vicenza and Perugia, playing limited first-team football over the next three seasons before joining Torino for the 2000–01 Serie B season.

Maspero's career was rejuvenated with the Granata, and he played a role in the team's return to Serie A. In the 2001–02 Serie A season, he earned hero status among the club's fans with a late equaliser in a 3–3 draw with cross-town rivals and eventual Serie A champions Juventus in the Derby della mole; Torino had initially been trailing 3–0. He also helped Torino to win an UEFA Intertoto Cup spot that season. After Torino suffered relegation to Serie B in 2003, he moved on to Fiorentina before playing in the amateur leagues, where he ended his career.

== Coaching career ==
After retirement, Maspero took a coaching job at Eccellenza amateurs Ciliverghe Mazzano, guiding them to a historical promotion to Serie D for the first time ever. This won him interest from Lega Pro professionals Pavia, who appointed him as new head coach for the 2014–15 season thereafter.

On 13 November 2018, he was hired by Pro Piacenza as head coach. As Pro Piacenza experienced financial difficulties, he left the club in early 2019.

On 25 February 2019, he signed with Giana Erminio. He was dismissed by Giana Erminio on 27 September 2019 after the team only gained 2 points in the preceding 6 games.

In July 2021, after two years of inactivity, Maspero was hired as the new head coach of Serie D amateurs Franciacorta.
