= Vladislav Zvara =

Slovak footballer

Personal information
- Full name: Vladislav Zvara
- Date of birth: 11 December 1971 (age 54)
- Place of birth: Spišská Nová Ves, Czechoslovakia
- Height: 1.73 m (5 ft 8 in)
- Position: Midfielder

Youth career
- FK Spišská Nová Ves

Senior career*
Years	Team	Apps	(Gls)
1991	Tatran Prešov	17	(0)
1992	Spartak Trnava	3	(0)
1992–1996	Tatran Prešov	88	(21)
1996–2002	1. FC Košice	182	(39)
2001	→ MFK Ružomberok (loan)	4	(0)
2003–2005	Artmedia Petržalka	25	(2)
2005–2007	HFC Humenné		

International career
1994–2000	Slovakia	29	(0)
- * Club domestic league appearances and goals

Vladislav Zvara (born 11 December 1971) is a Slovak former footballer who played for Tatran Prešov, 1. FC Košice, Artmedia Petržalka and he ended career in HFC Humenné. Zvara played 29 times for Slovakia.
