= 1999–2000 Villarreal CF season =

Villarreal
1999–2000 season
- President: Fernando Roig
- Head coach: Joaquín Caparrós (until 3 October); Paquito (from 9 October)
- Stadium: El Madrigal
- Segunda División: 3rd (promoted)
- Copa del Rey: Round of 16
- Top goalscorer: League: Moisés (17); All: Moisés (19)
- Biggest win: Recreativo 0–4 Villarreal
- Biggest defeat: Villarreal 1–5 Eibar

The 1999–2000 season was Villarreal Club de Fútbol's 77th season in existence and the club's first season back in the second division of Spanish football following relegation at the end of the 1998–99 La Liga season. In addition to the domestic league, Villarreal participated in this season's edition of the Copa del Rey. The season covered the period from 1 July 1999 to 30 June 2000.

== Competitions ==
=== Overall record ===
Competition	First match	Last match	Starting round	Final position	Record							
Competition	First match	Last match	Starting round	Final position	Pld	W	D	L	GF	GA	GD	Win %
Segunda División	21 August 1999	4 June 2000	Matchday 1	3rd	42	18	12	12	61	46	+15	42.86
Copa del Rey	10 November 1999	1 February 2000	First round	Round of 16	6	3	1	2	7	4	+3	50.00
Total					48	21	13	14	68	50	+18	43.75

Source: BDFutbol

=== Segunda División ===
==== League table ====
Pos	Team	Pld	W	D	L	GF	GA	GD	Pts	Promotion or relegation
1	Las Palmas (C, P)	42	20	12	10	60	41	+19	72	Promotion to La Liga
2	Osasuna (P)	42	20	7	15	50	36	+14	67	Promotion to La Liga
3	Villarreal (P)	42	18	12	12	61	46	+15	66	Promotion to La Liga
4	Salamanca	42	18	12	12	54	43	+11	66	
5	Lleida	42	18	9	15	66	52	+14	63	

Source: BDFutbol; RSSSF
Rules for classification: 1st points; 2nd head-to-head points; 3rd head-to-head goal difference; 4th head-to-head goals scored; 5th goal difference; 6th number of goals scored; 7th Fair-play points
(C) Champions; (P) Promoted

==== Results summary ====
Overall								Home						Away					
Pld	W	D	L	GF	GA	GD	Pts	W	D	L	GF	GA	GD	W	D	L	GF	GA	GD
42	18	12	12	61	46	+15	66	10	7	4	28	19	+9	8	5	8	33	27	+6

==== Results by round ====
Round	1	2	3	4	5	6	7	8	9	10	11	12	13	14	15	16	17	18	19	20	21	22	23	24	25	26	27	28	29	30	31	32	33	34	35	36	37	38	39	40	41	42
Ground	A	H	A	H	A	H	A	H	H	A	H	A	H	A	H	A	H	A	H	A	H	H	A	H	A	H	A	H	A	A	H	A	H	A	H	A	H	A	H	A	H	A
Result	D	D	W	D	W	L	L	W	D	L	L	W	W	D	L	L	W	D	W	L	W	L	W	W	D	W	L	W	L	D	D	W	D	W	W	W	W	L	D	W	D	L
Position	12	14	10	11	6	12	13	8	7	12	16	12	9	8	11	14	12	11	8	10	8	10	9	7	6	5	6	7	8	9	9	9	6	5	3	2	2	2	2	2	2	3

A = Away; H = Home; W = Win; D = Draw; L = Loss

==== Matches ====
21 August 1999 1	Lleida	2–2	Villarreal	Lleida
				Stadium: Camp d'Esports

29 August 1999 2	Villarreal	0–0	Salamanca	Villarreal
				Stadium: El Madrigal

5 September 1999 3	Albacete	0–2	Villarreal	Albacete
				Stadium: Carlos Belmonte

12 September 1999 4	Villarreal	0–0	Badajoz	Villarreal
				Stadium: El Madrigal

19 September 1999 5	Getafe	0–2	Villarreal	Getafe
				Stadium: Coliseum Alfonso Pérez

26 September 1999 6	Villarreal	1–5	Eibar	Villarreal
				Stadium: El Madrigal

3 October 1999 7	Elche	1–0	Villarreal	Elche
				Stadium: Manuel Martínez Valero

9 October 1999 8	Villarreal	3–0	Extremadura	Villarreal
				Stadium: El Madrigal

12 October 1999 9	Villarreal	1–1	Levante	Villarreal
				Stadium: El Madrigal

17 October 1999 10	Tenerife	3–1	Villarreal	Santa Cruz de Tenerife
				Stadium: Heliodoro Rodríguez López

24 October 1999 11	Villarreal	1–2	Sporting Gijón	Villarreal
				Stadium: El Madrigal

31 October 1999 12	Recreativo	0–4	Villarreal	Huelva
				Stadium: Nuevo Colombino

7 November 1999 13	Villarreal	4–1	Toledo	Villarreal
				Stadium: El Madrigal

14 November 1999 14	Mérida	1–1	Villarreal	Mérida
				Stadium: Romano

21 November 1999 15	Villarreal	1–2	Atlético Madrid B	Villarreal
				Stadium: El Madrigal

28 November 1999 16	Leganés	1–0	Villarreal	Leganés
				Stadium: Butarque

5 December 1999 17	Villarreal	1–0	Osasuna	Villarreal
				Stadium: El Madrigal

11 December 1999 18	Compostela	1–1	Villarreal	Santiago de Compostela
				Stadium: Multiusos de San Lázaro

19 December 1999 19	Villarreal	2–1	Córdoba	Villarreal
				Stadium: El Madrigal

4 January 2000 20	Las Palmas	2–1	Villarreal	Las Palmas
				Stadium: Insular

8 January 2000 21	Villarreal	1–0	Logroñés	Villarreal
				Stadium: El Madrigal

16 January 2000 22	Villarreal	2–3	Lleida	Villarreal
				Stadium: El Madrigal

23 January 2000 23	Salamanca	0–2	Villarreal	Villares de la Reina
				Stadium: Helmántico

29 January 2000 24	Villarreal	2–0	Albacete	Villarreal
				Stadium: El Madrigal

6 February 2000 25	Badajoz	1–1	Villarreal	Badajoz
				Stadium: Nuevo Vivero

13 February 2000 26	Villarreal	2–1	Getafe	Villarreal
				Stadium: El Madrigal

20 February 2000 27	Eibar	2–1	Villarreal	Eibar
				Stadium: Ipurua

27 February 2000 28	Villarreal	1–0	Elche	Villarreal
				Stadium: El Madrigal

5 March 2000 29	Extremadura	4–1	Villarreal	Almendralejo
				Stadium: Francisco de la Hera

12 March 2000 30	Levante	0–0	Villarreal	Valencia
				Stadium: Ciutat de València

19 March 2000 31	Villarreal	0–0	Tenerife	Villarreal
				Stadium: El Madrigal

26 March 2000 32	Sporting Gijón	1–2	Villarreal	Gijón
				Stadium: El Molinón

2 April 2000 33	Villarreal	1–1	Recreativo	Villarreal
				Stadium: El Madrigal

9 April 2000 34	Toledo	1–3	Villarreal	Toledo
				Stadium: Salto del Caballo

16 April 2000 35	Villarreal	1–0	Mérida	Villarreal
				Stadium: El Madrigal

23 April 2000 36	Atlético Madrid B	1–4	Villarreal	Majadahonda
				Stadium: Cerro del Espino

30 April 2000 37	Villarreal	2–0	Leganés	Villarreal
				Stadium: El Madrigal

7 May 2000 38	Osasuna	3–1	Villarreal	Pamplona
	Palacios 19'; Ángel Luis 44'; Rosado 59'		Calleja 74'	Stadium: El Sadar; Referee: Rafael Ramírez Domínguez

13 May 2000 39	Villarreal	1–1	Compostela	Villarreal
				Stadium: El Madrigal

20 May 2000 40	Córdoba	2–4	Villarreal	Córdoba

28 May 2000 41	Villarreal	1–1	Las Palmas	Villarreal
				Stadium: El Madrigal

4 June 2000 42	Logroñés	1–0	Villarreal	Logroño
				Stadium: Las Gaunas

=== Copa del Rey ===
==== First round ====
10 November 1999 First leg	Villarreal	0–1	Leganés	Villarreal
				Stadium: El Madrigal

1 December 1999 Second leg	Leganés	0–3 (a.e.t.) (1–3 agg.)	Villarreal	Leganés
				Stadium: Butarque

==== Second round ====
15 December 1999 First leg	Barakaldo	0–0	Villarreal	Barakaldo
				Stadium: Lasesarre

11 January 2000 Second leg	Villarreal	1–0 (1–0 agg.)	Barakaldo	Villarreal
				Stadium: El Madrigal

==== Round of 16 ====
19 January 2000 First leg	Compostela	3–0	Villarreal	Santiago de Compostela
				Stadium: Multiusos de San Lázaro

1 February 2000 Second leg	Villarreal	3–0 (a.e.t.) (3–3 agg.) (2–4 p)	Compostela	Villarreal
				Stadium: El Madrigal
