= 1999–2000 CP Mérida season =

CP Mérida
1999–2000 season
- Head coach: Paco Herrera (until 21 November); Juan Señor (from 21 November)
- Stadium: Estadio Francisco de la Hera
- Segunda División: 6th
- Copa del Rey: Quarter-finals

The 1999–2000 season was the 88th season in the existence of CP Mérida and the club's second consecutive season in the second division of Spanish football.

== Competitions ==
=== Overall record ===
Competition	First match	Last match	Starting round	Final position	Record							
Competition	First match	Last match	Starting round	Final position	Pld	W	D	L	GF	GA	GD	Win %
Segunda División	21 August 1999	4 June 2000	Matchday 1	6th	42	16	15	11	41	34	+7	38.10
Copa del Rey	10 November 1999	17 February 2000	First round	Quarter-finals	8	5	1	2	8	3	+5	62.50
Total					50	21	16	13	49	37	+12	42.00

Source: BDFutbol

=== Segunda División ===
==== League table ====
Pos	Team	Pld	W	D	L	GF	GA	GD	Pts	Promotion or relegation
4	Salamanca	42	18	12	12	54	43	+11	66	
5	Lleida	42	18	9	15	66	52	+14	63	
6	Mérida (R)	42	16	15	11	41	34	+7	63	Relegation to Segunda División B (Note: CP Mérida was relegated to Segunda División B for not paying its players. Then, Recreativo de Huelva was readmitted in Segunda División.)
7	Levante	42	16	13	13	55	52	+3	61	
8	Extremadura	42	16	13	13	49	47	+2	61	

Rules for classification: 1st points; 2nd head-to-head points; 3rd head-to-head goal difference; 4th head-to-head goals scored; 5th goal difference; 6th number of goals scored; 7th Fair-play points
(R) Relegated

==== Results summary ====
Overall								Home						Away					
Pld	W	D	L	GF	GA	GD	Pts	W	D	L	GF	GA	GD	W	D	L	GF	GA	GD
0	0	0	0	0	0	0	0	0	0	0	0	0	0	0	0	0	0	0	0

==== Results by round ====
Round	1
Ground	
Result	
Position	

A = Away; H = Home; W = Win; D = Draw; L = Loss

==== Matches ====
21 August 1999 1	Leganés	1–1	Mérida

29 August 1999 2	Mérida	2–0	Osasuna

4 September 1999 3	Compostela	1–2	Mérida

12 September 1999 4	Mérida	0–0	Córdoba

18 September 1999 5	Las Palmas	2–0	Mérida

26 September 1999 6	Mérida	2–2	Logroñés

3 October 1999 7	Lleida	0–0	Mérida

10 October 1999 8	Mérida	1–2	Salamanca

13 October 1999 9	Albacete	0–2	Mérida

17 October 1999 10	Mérida	0–0	Badajoz

24 October 1999 11	Getafe	1–0	Mérida

31 October 1999 12	Mérida	3–1	Eibar

7 November 1999 13	Elche	2–1	Mérida

14 November 1999 14	Mérida	1–1	Villarreal

21 November 1999 15	Levante	3–1	Mérida

28 November 1999 16	Mérida	2–0	Tenerife

5 December 1999 17	Sporting Gijón	1–2	Mérida

12 December 1999 18	Mérida	2–0	Recreativo

19 December 1999 19	Toledo	3–0	Mérida

4 January 2000 20	Extremadura	0–0	Mérida

9 January 2000 21	Mérida	0–1	Atlético Madrid B

16 January 2000 22	Mérida	0–4	Leganés

23 January 2000 23	Osasuna	0–0	Mérida

29 January 2000 24	Mérida	0–1	Compostela

6 February 2000 25	Córdoba	3–0	Mérida

13 February 2000 26	Mérida	3–0	Las Palmas

20 February 2000 27	Logroñés	1–2	Mérida

27 February 2000 28	Mérida	0–0	Lleida

5 March 2000 29	Salamanca	0–0	Mérida

11 March 2000 30	Mérida	1–1	Albacete

19 March 2000 31	Badajoz	0–3	Mérida

26 March 2000 32	Mérida	1–0	Getafe

2 April 2000 33	Eibar	0–0	Mérida

9 April 2000 34	Mérida	1–1	Elche

16 April 2000 35	Villarreal	1–0	Mérida

22 April 2000 36	Mérida	1–0	Levante

30 April 2000 37	Tenerife	0–1	Mérida

7 May 2000 38	Mérida	1–0	Sporting Gijón	Mérida

14 May 2000 39	Recreativo	0–3	Mérida	Huelva

21 May 2000 40	Mérida	1–1	Toledo	Mérida

28 May 2000 41	Mérida	1–0	Extremadura	Mérida

4 June 2000 42	Atlético Madrid B	0–0	Mérida	Madrid

=== Copa del Rey ===
==== First round ====
10 November 1999 First leg	Talavera	1–0	Mérida	Talavera de la Reina
				Referee: Pedro Tristante Oliva

1 December 1999 Second leg	Mérida	3–0 (3–1 agg.)	Talavera	Mérida
				Stadium: Estadio Romano

==== Second round ====
15 December 1999 First leg	Mérida	1–0	Real Betis	Mérida
				Stadium: Estadio Romano

12 January 2000 Second leg	Real Betis	0–1 (0–2 agg.)	Mérida	Seville
				Stadium: Benito Villamarín

==== Round of 16 ====
19 January 2000 First leg	Mérida	1–0	Oviedo	Mérida
				Stadium: Estadio Romano

2 February 2000 Second leg	Oviedo	0–0 (0–1 agg.)	Mérida	Oviedo
				Stadium: Carlos Tartiere

==== Quarter-finals ====
9 February 2000 First leg	Real Madrid	1–0	Mérida	Madrid
				Stadium: Santiago Bernabéu; Attendance: 15,000; Referee: Juan Antonio Fernández Marín

17 February 2000 Second leg	Mérida	2–1 (2–2 (a) agg.)	Real Madrid	Mérida
				Stadium: Estadio Romano
