= 1999–2000 CF Extremadura season =

CF Extremadura
1999–2000 season
- Head coach: Josu Ortuondo
- Stadium: Estadio Francisco de la Hera
- Segunda División: 8th
- Copa del Rey: First round

The 1999–2000 season was the 76th season in the existence of CF Extremadura and the club's first season back in the second division of Spanish football. The season covered the period from 1 July 1999 to 30 June 2000.

== Competitions ==
=== La Liga ===
==== League table ====
Pos	Team	Pld	W	D	L	GF	GA	GD	Pts	Promotion or relegation
6	Mérida (R)	42	16	15	11	41	34	+7	63	Relegation to Segunda División B (Note: CP Mérida was relegated to Segunda División B for not paying its players. Then, Recreativo de Huelva was readmitted in Segunda División.)
7	Levante	42	16	13	13	55	52	+3	61	
8	Extremadura	42	16	13	13	49	47	+2	61	
9	Sporting Gijón	42	17	9	16	54	48	+6	60	
10	Albacete	42	15	14	13	51	53	−2	59	

Rules for classification: 1st points; 2nd head-to-head points; 3rd head-to-head goal difference; 4th head-to-head goals scored; 5th goal difference; 6th number of goals scored; 7th Fair-play points
(R) Relegated

==== Results summary ====
Overall								Home						Away					
Pld	W	D	L	GF	GA	GD	Pts	W	D	L	GF	GA	GD	W	D	L	GF	GA	GD
0	0	0	0	0	0	0	0	0	0	0	0	0	0	0	0	0	0	0	0

==== Results by round ====
Round	1	2	3	4	5	6	7	8	9	10	11	12	13	14	15	16	17
Ground																	
Result	W	W	W	W	W	D	W	L	D	D	W	L	W	L	D	D	W
Position																	

A = Away; H = Home; W = Win; D = Draw; L = Loss

==== Matches ====
22 August 1999 1	Extremadura	1–0	Atlético Madrid B	Extremadura

28 August 1999 2	Getafe	1–2	Extremadura	Getafe

4 September 1999 3	Extremadura	2–0	Leganés	Extremadura

11 September 1999 4	Eibar	0–1	Extremadura	Eibar

19 September 1999 5	Extremadura	1–0	Osasuna	Extremadura

26 September 1999 6	Elche	1–1	Extremadura	Elche

3 October 1999 7	Extremadura	3–1	Compostela

9 October 1999 8	Villarreal	3–0	Extremadura

12 October 1999 9	Extremadura	0–0	Córdoba

17 October 1999 10	Levante	1–1	Extremadura

23 October 1999 11	Extremadura	2–1	Las Palmas

31 October 1999 12	Tenerife	3–0	Extremadura

7 November 1999 13	Extremadura	3–1	Logroñés

14 November 1999 14	Sporting Gijón	1–0	Extremadura

21 November 1999 15	Extremadura	1–1	Lleida

28 November 1999 16	Recreativo	1–1	Extremadura

5 December 1999 17	Extremadura	1–0	Salamanca

12 December 1999 18	Toledo	2–0	Extremadura

18 December 1999 19	Extremadura	3–0	Albacete

4 January 2000 20	Extremadura	0–0	Mérida

9 January 2000 21	Badajoz	2–0	Extremadura

15 January 2000 22	Atlético Madrid B	4–2	Extremadura

23 January 2000 23	Extremadura	1–0	Getafe

30 January 2000 24	Leganés	0–0	Extremadura

6 February 2000 25	Extremadura	3–0	Eibar

13 February 2000 26	Osasuna	2–0	Extremadura

20 February 2000 27	Extremadura	1–1	Elche

27 February 2000 28	Compostela	2–0	Extremadura

5 March 2000 29	Extremadura	4–1	Villarreal

11 March 2000 30	Córdoba	2–1	Extremadura

19 March 2000 31	Extremadura	1–1	Levante

26 March 2000 32	Las Palmas	0–1	Extremadura

2 April 2000 33	Extremadura	0–0	Tenerife

8 April 2000 34	Logroñés	1–1	Extremadura

16 April 2000 35	Extremadura	2–2	Sporting Gijón

23 April 2000 36	Lleida	2–3	Extremadura

29 April 2000 37	Extremadura	1–0	Recreativo

7 May 2000 38	Salamanca	2–1	Extremadura

14 May 2000 39	Extremadura	1–2	Toledo

21 May 2000 40	Albacete	3–1	Extremadura

28 May 2000 41	Mérida	1–0	Extremadura

4 June 2000 42	Extremadura	2–2	Badajoz

=== Copa del Rey ===
==== First round ====
10 November 1999 First leg	Extremadura	1–1	Alavés	Extremadura

1 December 1999 Second leg	Alavés	1–0 (2–1 agg.)	Extremadura	Vitoria-Gasteiz
				Stadium: Mendizorrotza; Referee: Juan Manuel Brito Arceo
