= 1999–2000 CD Toledo season =

CD Toledo
1999–2000 season
- President: Eduardo Herrera
- Head coach: Luis Sánchez Duque
- Stadium: Estadio Salto del Caballo
- Segunda División: 22nd (relegated)
- Copa del Rey: First round

The 1999–2000 season was the 61st season in the existence of CD Toledo and the club's seventh consecutive season in the second division of Spanish football.

== Pre-season and friendlies ==
Win Draw Loss

22 September 1999 Friendly	Toledo (Spain)	1–1	(Spain) Real Madrid	Toledo, Spain
CEST (UTC+02:00)	F. Alvárez		Baljić ?' (pen.)	Stadium: Salto del Caballo; Referee: Rubio Iniesta

== Competitions ==
=== Segunda División ===
==== League table ====
Pos	Team	Pld	W	D	L	GF	GA	GD	Pts	Promotion or relegation
18	Compostela	42	10	19	13	50	53	−3	49	
19	Getafe	42	13	9	20	39	51	−12	48	
20	Logroñés (R)	42	11	13	18	52	56	−4	46	Relegation to Segunda División B (Note: CD Logroñés was relegated to Tercera División for not paying its players.)
21	Recreativo	42	12	9	21	40	54	−14	45	Re-admitted (Note: CP Mérida was relegated to Segunda División B for not paying its players. Then, Recreativo de Huelva was readmitted in Segunda División.)
22	Toledo (R)	42	10	10	22	34	55	−21	40	Relegation to Segunda División B

Rules for classification: 1st points; 2nd head-to-head points; 3rd head-to-head goal difference; 4th head-to-head goals scored; 5th goal difference; 6th number of goals scored; 7th Fair-play points
(R) Relegated

==== Results summary ====
Overall								Home						Away					
Pld	W	D	L	GF	GA	GD	Pts	W	D	L	GF	GA	GD	W	D	L	GF	GA	GD
0	0	0	0	0	0	0	0	0	0	0	0	0	0	0	0	0	0	0	0

Source: BDFutbol

==== Results by round ====
Round	1
Ground	
Result	
Position	

Source: BDFutbol
A = Away; H = Home; W = Win; D = Draw; L = Loss

==== Matches ====
22 August 1999 1	Osasuna	3–0	Toledo	Pamplona

29 August 1999 2	Toledo	0–1	Compostela	Toledo

5 September 1999 3	Córdoba	0–2	Toledo	Córdoba

11 September 1999 4	Toledo	1–3	Las Palmas	Toledo

19 September 1999 5	Logroñés	2–1	Toledo	Logroño

26 September 1999 6	Toledo	0–3	Lleida	Toledo

3 October 1999 7	Salamanca	0–0	Toledo	Salamanca

9 October 1999 8	Toledo	0–2	Albacete	Toledo

12 October 1999 9	Badajoz	1–1	Toledo	Badajoz

17 October 1999 10	Toledo	0–0	Getafe	Toledo

24 October 1999 11	Eibar	2–1	Toledo	Eibar

31 October 1999 12	Toledo	2–0	Elche	Toledo

7 November 1999 13	Villarreal	4–1	Toledo	Villarreal

14 November 1999 14	Toledo	0–1	Levante	Toledo

21 November 1999 15	Tenerife	3–0	Toledo	Santa Cruz de Tenerife

28 November 1999 16	Toledo	0–0	Sporting Gijón	Toledo

5 December 1999 17	Recreativo	3–0	Toledo	Huelva

12 December 1999 18	Toledo	2–0	Extremadura	Toledo

19 December 1999 19	Toledo	3–0	Mérida	Toledo

5 January 2000 20	Atlético Madrid B	2–1	Toledo	Madrid

8 January 2000 21	Toledo	1–1	Leganés	Toledo

16 January 2000 22	Toledo	0–1	Osasuna	Toledo

23 January 2000 23	Compostela	0–0	Toledo	Santiago de Compostela

30 January 2000 24	Toledo	0–3	Córdoba	Toledo

5 February 2000 25	Las Palmas	0–0	Toledo	Las Palmas

13 February 2000 26	Toledo	2–1	Logroñés	Toledo

20 February 2000 27	Lleida	1–0	Toledo	Lleida

27 February 2000 28	Toledo	3–0	Salamanca	Toledo

5 March 2000 29	Albacete	2–1	Toledo	Albacete

12 March 2000 30	Toledo	2–0	Badajoz	Toledo

19 March 2000 31	Getafe	2–0	Toledo	Getafe

26 March 2000 32	Toledo	1–2	Eibar	Toledo

1 April 2000 33	Elche	1–0	Toledo	Elche

9 April 2000 34	Toledo	1–3	Villarreal	Toledo

16 April 2000 35	Levante	1–0	Toledo	Valencia

22 April 2000 36	Toledo	1–1	Tenerife	Toledo

30 April 2000 37	Sporting Gijón	0–1	Toledo	Gijón

7 May 2000 38	Toledo	0–2	Recreativo	Toledo

14 May 2000 39	Extremadura	1–2	Toledo	Almendralejo

21 May 2000 40	Mérida	1–1	Toledo	Mérida

28 May 2000 41	Toledo	1–1	Atlético Madrid B	Toledo

3 June 2000 42	Leganés	1–2	Toledo	Leganés

=== Copa del Rey ===
==== First round ====
10 November 1999 First leg	Eibar	1–0	Toledo	Eibar

1 December 1999 Second leg	Toledo	0–0 (0–1 agg.)	Eibar	Toledo
