= 1999–2000 Levante UD season =

Levante UD
1999–2000 season
- Head coach: Pepe Balaguer
- Stadium: Estadio Francisco de la Hera
- Segunda División: 7th
- Copa del Rey: Preliminary round
- Biggest defeat: Sporting Gijón 4–0 Levante

The 1999–2000 season was the 91st season in the existence of Levante UD and the club's first season back in the second division of Spanish football.

== Competitions ==
=== Overall record ===
Competition	First match	Last match	Starting round	Final position	Record							
Competition	First match	Last match	Starting round	Final position	Pld	W	D	L	GF	GA	GD	Win %
Segunda División	22 August 1999	4 June 2000	Matchday 1	7th	42	16	13	13	55	52	+3	38.10
Copa del Rey	1 September 1999		Preliminary round	Preliminary round	1	0	0	1	0	2	−2	0.00
Total					43	16	13	14	55	54	+1	37.21

Source: BDFutbol

=== Segunda División ===
==== League table ====
Pos	Team	Pld	W	D	L	GF	GA	GD	Pts	Promotion or relegation
5	Lleida	42	18	9	15	66	52	+14	63	
6	Mérida (R)	42	16	15	11	41	34	+7	63	Relegation to Segunda División B (Note: CP Mérida was relegated to Segunda División B for not paying its players. Then, Recreativo de Huelva was readmitted in Segunda División.)
7	Levante	42	16	13	13	55	52	+3	61	
8	Extremadura	42	16	13	13	49	47	+2	61	
9	Sporting Gijón	42	17	9	16	54	48	+6	60	

Rules for classification: 1st points; 2nd head-to-head points; 3rd head-to-head goal difference; 4th head-to-head goals scored; 5th goal difference; 6th number of goals scored; 7th Fair-play points
(R) Relegated

==== Results summary ====
Overall								Home						Away					
Pld	W	D	L	GF	GA	GD	Pts	W	D	L	GF	GA	GD	W	D	L	GF	GA	GD
0	0	0	0	0	0	0	0	0	0	0	0	0	0	0	0	0	0	0	0

==== Results by round ====
Round	1
Ground	
Result	
Position	

A = Away; H = Home; W = Win; D = Draw; L = Loss

==== Matches ====
22 August 1999 1	Logroñés	3–3	Levante

28 August 1999 2	Levante	3–0	Lleida

5 September 1999 3	Salamanca	3–0	Levante

12 September 1999 4	Levante	2–0	Albacete

19 September 1999 5	Badajoz	1–1	Levante

25 September 1999 6	Levante	2–0	Getafe

3 October 1999 7	Eibar	4–2	Levante

9 October 1999 8	Levante	2–1	Elche

12 October 1999 9	Villarreal	1–1	Levante

17 October 1999 10	Levante	1–1	Extremadura

24 October 1999 11	Levante	2–1	Tenerife

31 October 1999 12	Sporting Gijón	4–0	Levante

7 November 1999 13	Levante	2–0	Recreativo

14 November 1999 14	Toledo	0–1	Levante

21 November 1999 15	Levante	3–1	Mérida

28 November 1999 16	Atlético Madrid B	2–4	Levante

5 December 1999 17	Levante	5–2	Leganés

11 December 1999 18	Osasuna	2–0	Levante

19 December 1999 19	Levante	0–0	Compostela

4 January 2000 20	Córdoba	1–1	Levante

9 January 2000 21	Levante	1–1	Las Palmas

16 January 2000 22	Levante	1–0	Logroñés

22 January 2000 23	Lleida	2–0	Levante

30 January 2000 24	Levante	2–3	Salamanca

6 February 2000 25	Albacete	2–0	Levante

12 February 2000 26	Levante	1–1	Badajoz

19 February 2000 27	Getafe	0–1	Levante

27 February 2000 28	Levante	0–0	Eibar

4 March 2000 29	Elche	1–1	Levante

12 March 2000 30	Levante	0–0	Villarreal

19 March 2000 31	Extremadura	1–1	Levante

26 March 2000 32	Tenerife	1–1	Levante

2 April 2000 33	Levante	0–2	Sporting Gijón

9 April 2000 34	Recreativo	1–0	Levante

16 April 2000 35	Levante	1–0	Toledo

22 April 2000 36	Mérida	1–0	Levante

29 April 2000 37	Levante	3–0	Atlético Madrid B

7 May 2000 38	Leganés	2–0	Levante

14 May 2000 39	Levante	2–1	Osasuna

21 May 2000 40	Compostela	4–1	Levante

28 May 2000 41	Levante	3–0	Córdoba

4 June 2000 42	Las Palmas	2–1	Levante

=== Copa del Rey ===
==== Preliminary round ====
1 September 1999 Preliminary round	Premià	2–0	Levante
