= 1999–2000 CA Osasuna season =

CA Osasuna
1999–2000 season
- President: Javier Miranda Martinez
- Head coach: Miguel Ángel Lotina
- Stadium: El Sadar
- Segunda División: 2nd (promoted)
- Copa del Rey: Quarter-finals
- Top goalscorer: League: Iván Rosado (11); All: Iván Rosado (11)
- Biggest win: Osasuna 5–0 Tenerife
- Biggest defeat: Osasuna 0–4 Barcelona

The 1999–2000 season was the 80th season in the existence of CA Osasuna and the club's sixth consecutive season in the second division of Spanish football. The season covered the period from 1 July 1999 to 30 June 2000.

== Competitions ==
=== Overall record ===
Competition	First match	Last match	Starting round	Final position	Record							
Competition	First match	Last match	Starting round	Final position	Pld	W	D	L	GF	GA	GD	Win %
Segunda División	22 August 1999	4 June 2000	Matchday 1	2nd	42	20	7	15	50	36	+14	47.62
Copa del Rey	10 November 1999	16 February 2000	First round	Quarter-finals	8	4	1	3	7	9	−2	50.00
Total					50	24	8	18	57	45	+12	48.00

Source: BDFutbol

=== Segunda División ===
==== League table ====
Pos	Team	Pld	W	D	L	GF	GA	GD	Pts	Promotion or relegation
1	Las Palmas (C, P)	42	20	12	10	60	41	+19	72	Promotion to La Liga
2	Osasuna (P)	42	20	7	15	50	36	+14	67	Promotion to La Liga
3	Villarreal (P)	42	18	12	12	61	46	+15	66	Promotion to La Liga
4	Salamanca	42	18	12	12	54	43	+11	66	
5	Lleida	42	18	9	15	66	52	+14	63	

Source: BDFutbol; RSSSF
Rules for classification: 1st points; 2nd head-to-head points; 3rd head-to-head goal difference; 4th head-to-head goals scored; 5th goal difference; 6th number of goals scored; 7th Fair-play points
(C) Champions; (P) Promoted

==== Results summary ====
Overall								Home						Away					
Pld	W	D	L	GF	GA	GD	Pts	W	D	L	GF	GA	GD	W	D	L	GF	GA	GD
42	20	7	15	50	36	+14	67	13	3	5	31	12	+19	7	4	10	19	24	−5

==== Results by round ====
Round	1	2	3	4	5	6	7	8	9	10	11	12	13	14	15	16	17	18	19	20	21	22	23	24	25	26	27	28	29	30	31	32	33	34	35	36	37	38	39	40	41	42
Ground																																										
Result	W	L	W	W	L	D	L	W	L																																	
Position	2	9	6	4	7	6	9	7	10																																	

A = Away; H = Home; W = Win; D = Draw; L = Loss

==== Matches ====
22 August 1999 1	Osasuna	3–0	Toledo	Pamplona
				Stadium: El Sadar

29 August 1999 2	Mérida	2–0	Osasuna

4 September 1999 3	Osasuna	1–0	Atlético Madrid B	Pamplona
				Stadium: El Sadar

12 September 1999 4	Leganés	0–1	Osasuna

19 September 1999 5	Extremadura	1–0	Osasuna

26 September 1999 6	Osasuna	2–2	Compostela	Pamplona
				Stadium: El Sadar

2 October 1999 7	Córdoba	2–1	Osasuna

9 October 1999 8	Osasuna	1–0	Las Palmas	Pamplona
				Stadium: El Sadar

12 October 1999 9	Logroñés	3–1	Osasuna

17 October 1999 10	Osasuna	3–1	Lleida	Pamplona
				Stadium: El Sadar

24 October 1999 11	Salamanca	1–0	Osasuna

31 October 1999 12	Osasuna	0–1	Albacete	Pamplona
				Stadium: El Sadar

7 November 1999 13	Badajoz	0–1	Osasuna

14 November 1999 14	Osasuna	0–1	Getafe	Pamplona
				Stadium: El Sadar

21 November 1999 15	Eibar	4–1	Osasuna

28 November 1999 16	Osasuna	0–1	Elche	Pamplona
				Stadium: El Sadar

5 December 1999 17	Villarreal	1–0	Osasuna

11 December 1999 18	Osasuna	2–0	Levante	Pamplona
				Stadium: El Sadar

19 December 1999 19	Tenerife	1–1	Osasuna

4 January 2000 20	Osasuna	1–0	Sporting Gijón	Pamplona
				Stadium: El Sadar

8 January 2000 21	Recreativo	0–1	Osasuna

16 January 2000 22	Toledo	0–1	Osasuna

23 January 2000 23	Osasuna	0–0	Mérida	Pamplona
				Stadium: El Sadar

30 January 2000 24	Atlético Madrid B	1–1	Osasuna

6 February 2000 25	Osasuna	1–2	Leganés	Pamplona
				Stadium: El Sadar

13 February 2000 26	Osasuna	2–0	Extremadura	Pamplona
				Stadium: El Sadar

20 February 2000 27	Compostela	1–2	Osasuna

27 February 2000 28	Osasuna	0–2	Córdoba	Pamplona
				Stadium: El Sadar

5 March 2000 29	Las Palmas	0–2	Osasuna	Las Palmas

11 March 2000 30	Osasuna	2–0	Logroñés	Pamplona
				Stadium: El Sadar

19 March 2000 31	Lleida	1–0	Osasuna	Lleida

26 March 2000 32	Osasuna	1–0	Salamanca	Pamplona
				Stadium: El Sadar

2 April 2000 33	Albacete	2–1	Osasuna	Albacete
				Stadium: Carlos Belmonte

9 April 2000 34	Osasuna	0–0	Badajoz	Pamplona
				Stadium: El Sadar

16 April 2000 35	Getafe	0–0	Osasuna	Getafe
				Stadium: Coliseum Alfonso Pérez

22 April 2000 36	Osasuna	2–0	Eibar	Pamplona
				Stadium: El Sadar

30 April 2000 37	Elche	1–3	Osasuna	Elche
				Stadium: Estadio Manuel Martínez Valero

7 May 2000 38	Osasuna	3–1	Villarreal	Pamplona
	Palacios 19'; Ángel Luis 44'; Rosado 59'		Calleja 74'	Stadium: El Sadar; Referee: Rafael Ramírez Domínguez

14 May 2000 39	Levante	2–1	Osasuna	Valencia

20 May 2000 40	Osasuna	5–0	Tenerife	Pamplona
				Stadium: El Sadar

28 May 2000 41	Sporting Gijón	1–1	Osasuna	Gijón

4 June 2000 42	Osasuna	2–1	Recreativo	Pamplona
				Stadium: El Sadar

=== Copa del Rey ===
==== First round ====
10 November 1999 First leg	Osasuna	1–0	Sevilla	Pamplona
				Stadium: El Sadar

1 December 1999 Second leg	Sevilla	1–1 (1–2 agg.)	Osasuna	Seville

==== Second round ====
15 December 1999 First leg	Osasuna	3–0	Valencia	Pamplona
				Stadium: El Sadar

12 January 2000 Second leg	Valencia	2–0 (2–3 agg.)	Osasuna	Valencia
				Stadium: Mestalla

==== Round of 16 ====
19 January 2000 First leg	Osasuna	1–0	Deportivo La Coruña	Pamplona
				Stadium: El Sadar

2 February 2000 Second leg	Deportivo La Coruña	0–1 (0–2 agg.)	Osasuna	A Coruña
				Stadium: Estadio Riazor

==== Quarter-finals ====
10 February 2000 First leg	Osasuna	0–4	Barcelona	Pamplona
				Stadium: El Sadar

16 February 2000 Second leg	Barcelona	2–0 (6–0 agg.)	Osasuna	Barcelona
				Stadium: Camp Nou
