= 1999–2000 Albacete Balompié season =

Albacete Balompié
1999–2000 season
- Segunda División: 10th
- Copa del Rey: Second round

The 1999–2000 season was the 60th season in the existence of Albacete Balompié and the club's fourth consecutive season in the second division of Spanish football.

== Competitions ==
=== La Liga ===
==== League table ====
Pos	Team	Pld	W	D	L	GF	GA	GD	Pts
8	Extremadura	42	16	13	13	49	47	+2	61
9	Sporting Gijón	42	17	9	16	54	48	+6	60
10	Albacete	42	15	14	13	51	53	−2	59
11	Eibar	42	14	15	13	48	49	−1	57
12	Córdoba	42	15	12	15	46	49	−3	57

Rules for classification: 1st points; 2nd head-to-head points; 3rd head-to-head goal difference; 4th head-to-head goals scored; 5th goal difference; 6th number of goals scored; 7th Fair-play points

==== Results summary ====
Overall								Home						Away					
Pld	W	D	L	GF	GA	GD	Pts	W	D	L	GF	GA	GD	W	D	L	GF	GA	GD
0	0	0	0	0	0	0	0	0	0	0	0	0	0	0	0	0	0	0	0

==== Results by round ====
Round	1	2	3	4	5	6	7	8	9	10	11	12	13	14	15
Ground															
Result	W	D	L	L	W	W	D	W	L	W	D	W	D	L	D
Position															

A = Away; H = Home; W = Win; D = Draw; L = Loss

==== Matches ====
22 August 1999 1	Albacete	3–1	Eibar

29 August 1999 2	Elche	1–1	Albacete

5 September 1999 3	Albacete	0–2	Villarreal

12 September 1999 4	Levante	2–0	Albacete

18 September 1999 5	Albacete	1–0	Tenerife

26 September 1999 6	Sporting Gijón	1–2	Albacete

3 October 1999 7	Albacete	1–1	Recreativo

9 October 1999 8	Toledo	0–2	Albacete

13 October 1999 9	Albacete	0–2	Mérida

17 October 1999 10	Atlético Madrid B	0–1	Albacete

24 October 1999 11	Albacete	0–0	Leganés

31 October 1999 12	Osasuna	0–1	Albacete

7 November 1999 13	Albacete	2–2	Compostela

14 November 1999 14	Córdoba	3–2	Albacete

20 November 1999 15	Albacete	1–1	Las Palmas

28 November 1999 16	Logroñés	4–1	Albacete

4 December 1999 17	Albacete	2–2	Lleida

11 December 1999 18	Salamanca	2–1	Albacete

18 December 1999 19	Extremadura	3–0	Albacete

5 January 2000 20	Albacete	0–1	Badajoz

9 January 2000 21	Getafe	1–1	Albacete

16 January 2000 22	Eibar	0–1	Albacete

23 January 2000 23	Albacete	1–1	Elche

29 January 2000 24	Villarreal	2–0	Albacete

6 February 2000 25	Albacete	2–0	Levante

13 February 2000 26	Tenerife	2–2	Albacete

20 February 2000 27	Albacete	1–2	Sporting Gijón

27 February 2000 28	Recreativo	3–3	Albacete

5 March 2000 29	Albacete	2–1	Toledo

11 March 2000 30	Mérida	1–1	Albacete

19 March 2000 31	Albacete	1–0	Atlético Madrid B

26 March 2000 32	Leganés	1–0	Albacete

2 April 2000 33	Albacete	2–1	Osasuna

9 April 2000 34	Compostela	1–1	Albacete

16 April 2000 35	Albacete	1–0	Córdoba

22 April 2000 36	Las Palmas	2–1	Albacete

30 April 2000 37	Albacete	2–2	Logroñés

6 May 2000 38	Lleida	2–2	Albacete

13 May 2000 39	Albacete	1–0	Salamanca

21 May 2000 40	Albacete	3–1	Extremadura

27 May 2000 41	Badajoz	1–2	Albacete

4 June 2000 42	Albacete	0–1	Getafe

=== Copa del Rey ===
==== First round ====
10 November 1999 First leg	Ponferradina	1–1	Albacete

1 December 1999 Second leg	Albacete	3–1 (a.e.t.) (4–2 agg.)	Ponferradina

==== Second round ====
15 December 1999 First leg	Albacete	0–0	Espanyol

12 January 2000 Second leg	Espanyol	2–0 (2–0 agg.)	Albacete
