= 1999–2000 Elche CF season =

Elche CF
1999–2000 season
- President: Diego Quiles Navarro
- Head coach: Tolo Plaza (1–21); Casimiro Torres Ibáñez (22–23); Jorge D'Alessandro (24–42)
- Stadium: Estadio Manuel Martínez Valero
- Segunda División: 15th
- Copa del Rey: Preliminary round

The 1999–2000 season was the 77th season in the existence of Elche CF and the club's first season back in the second division of Spanish football. The season covered the period from 1 July 1999 to 30 June 2000.

== Pre-season and friendlies ==
Win Draw Loss

19 January 2000 Friendly	Elche (Spain)	2–2	(Germany) Bayern Munich	Elche
--:-- CET (UTC+1)			Sergio; Tarnat	Stadium: Martínez Valero

== Competitions ==
=== La Liga ===
==== League table ====
Pos	Team	Pld	W	D	L	GF	GA	GD	Pts	Promotion or relegation
13	Leganés	42	14	14	14	39	47	−8	56	
14	Tenerife	42	14	13	15	50	48	+2	55	
15	Elche	42	12	17	13	48	58	−10	53	
16	Badajoz	42	9	24	9	38	39	−1	51	
17	Atlético Madrid B (R)	42	13	11	18	43	57	−14	50	Relegation to Segunda División B (Note: Atlético de Madrid B was relegated for being reserve team of Atlético de Madrid, relegated from Primera División.)

Rules for classification: 1st points; 2nd head-to-head points; 3rd head-to-head goal difference; 4th head-to-head goals scored; 5th goal difference; 6th number of goals scored; 7th Fair-play points
(R) Relegated

==== Results summary ====
Overall								Home						Away					
Pld	W	D	L	GF	GA	GD	Pts	W	D	L	GF	GA	GD	W	D	L	GF	GA	GD
42	12	17	13	48	58	−10	53	8	9	4	27	26	+1	4	8	9	21	32	−11

==== Results by round ====
Round	1	2	3	4	5	6	7	8	9	10	11	12	13	14	15	16	17	18	19	20	21	22	23	24	25	26	27	28	29	30	31	32	33	34	35	36	37	38	39	40	41	42
Ground	A	H	A	H	A	H	H	A	H	A	H	A	H	A	H	A	H	A	H	A	H	H	A	H	A	H	A	A	H	A	H	A	H	A	H	A	H	A	H	A	H	A
Result	L	D	D	D	D	D	W	L	L	W	W	L	W	L	D	W	D	L	L	D	L	D	D	D	W	W	D	L	D	L	W	W	W	D	D	D	L	D	W	L	W	L
Position																																										

A = Away; H = Home; W = Win; D = Draw; L = Loss

==== Matches ====
22 August 1999 1	Salamanca	2–1	Elche	Salamanca

29 August 1999 2	Elche	1–1	Albacete	Elche
				Stadium: Estadio Manuel Martínez Valero

4 September 1999 3	Badajoz	1–1	Elche	Badajoz

11 September 1999 4	Elche	1–1	Getafe	Elche
				Stadium: Estadio Manuel Martínez Valero

18 September 1999 5	Eibar	1–1	Elche	Eibar

26 September 1999 6	Elche	1–1	Extremadura	Elche
				Stadium: Estadio Manuel Martínez Valero

3 October 1999 7	Elche	1–0	Villarreal	Elche
				Stadium: Estadio Manuel Martínez Valero

9 October 1999 8	Levante	2–1	Elche	Valencia

12 October 1999 9	Elche	1–3	Tenerife	Elche
				Stadium: Estadio Manuel Martínez Valero

17 October 1999 10	Sporting Gijón	0–2	Elche	Gijón

24 October 1999 11	Elche	3–1	Recreativo	Elche
				Stadium: Estadio Manuel Martínez Valero

31 October 1999 12	Toledo	2–0	Elche	Toledo

7 November 1999 13	Elche	2–1	Mérida	Elche
				Stadium: Estadio Manuel Martínez Valero

14 November 1999 14	Atlético Madrid B	3–0	Elche	Madrid

21 November 1999 15	Elche	1–1	Leganés	Elche
				Stadium: Estadio Manuel Martínez Valero

28 November 1999 16	Osasuna	0–1	Elche	Pamplona

5 December 1999 17	Elche	1–1	Compostela	Elche
				Stadium: Estadio Manuel Martínez Valero

12 December 1999 18	Córdoba	2–1	Elche	Córdoba

19 December 1999 19	Elche	0–3	Las Palmas	Elche
				Stadium: Estadio Manuel Martínez Valero

4 January 2000 20	Logroñés	2–2	Elche

8 January 2000 21	Elche	1–3	Lleida	Elche
				Stadium: Estadio Manuel Martínez Valero

16 January 2000 22	Elche	2–2	Salamanca	Elche
				Stadium: Estadio Manuel Martínez Valero

23 January 2000 23	Albacete	1–1	Elche	Albacete
				Stadium: Estadio Carlos Belmonte

30 January 2000 24	Elche	0–0	Badajoz	Elche
				Stadium: Estadio Manuel Martínez Valero

5 February 2000 25	Getafe	1–2	Elche	Getafe
				Stadium: Coliseum Alfonso Pérez

13 February 2000 26	Elche	2–0	Eibar	Elche
				Stadium: Estadio Manuel Martínez Valero

20 February 2000 27	Extremadura	1–1	Elche	Extremadura

27 February 2000 28	Villarreal	1–0	Elche	Villarreal

4 March 2000 29	Elche	1–1	Levante	Elche
				Stadium: Estadio Manuel Martínez Valero

11 March 2000 30	Tenerife	1–0	Elche	Santa Cruz de Tenerife

19 March 2000 31	Elche	2–1	Sporting Gijón	Elche
				Stadium: Estadio Manuel Martínez Valero

26 March 2000 32	Recreativo	1–2	Elche	Huelva

1 April 2000 33	Elche	1–0	Toledo	Elche
				Stadium: Estadio Manuel Martínez Valero

9 April 2000 34	Mérida	1–1	Elche	Mérida

16 April 2000 35	Elche	1–1	Atlético Madrid B	Elche
				Stadium: Estadio Manuel Martínez Valero

22 April 2000 36	Leganés	0–0	Elche	Leganés

30 April 2000 37	Elche	1–3	Osasuna	Elche
				Stadium: Estadio Manuel Martínez Valero

7 May 2000 38	Compostela	1–1	Elche	Santiago de Compostela

13 May 2000 39	Elche	2–1	Córdoba	Elche
				Stadium: Estadio Manuel Martínez Valero

21 May 2000 40	Las Palmas	4–1	Elche	Las Palmas

28 May 2000 41	Elche	2–1	Logroñés	Elche
				Stadium: Estadio Manuel Martínez Valero

3 June 2000 42	Lleida	5–2	Elche	Lleida

=== Copa del Rey ===
==== Preliminary round ====
1 September 1999 Preliminary round	Novelda	2–1	Elche
