= 1999–2000 CD Leganés season =

CD Leganés
1999–2000 season
- Manager: José Antonio Fernández González (until 2 October); Cortijo (caretaker, 2 to 10 October); Enrique Martín (from 11 October)
- Segunda División: 13th
- Copa del Rey: First round
- Top goalscorer: League: Sergio Pachón (12); All: Sergio Pachón (12)

The 1999–2000 season was the 72nd season in the existence of CD Leganés and the club's seventh consecutive season in the second division of Spanish football. The season covered the period from 1 July 1999 to 30 June 2000.

== Competitions ==
=== Overall record ===
Competition	First match	Last match	Starting round	Final position	Record							
Competition	First match	Last match	Starting round	Final position	Pld	W	D	L	GF	GA	GD	Win %
Segunda División	21 August 1999	3 June 2000	Matchday 1	13th	42	14	14	14	39	47	−8	33.33
Copa del Rey	10 November 1999	1 December 1999	First round	First round	2	1	0	1	1	3	−2	50.00
Total					44	15	14	15	40	50	−10	34.09

Source: BDFutbol

=== La Liga ===
==== League table ====
Pos	Team	Pld	W	D	L	GF	GA	GD	Pts
11	Eibar	42	14	15	13	48	49	−1	57
12	Córdoba	42	15	12	15	46	49	−3	57
13	Leganés	42	14	14	14	39	47	−8	56
14	Tenerife	42	14	13	15	50	48	+2	55
15	Elche	42	12	17	13	48	58	−10	53

Rules for classification: 1st points; 2nd head-to-head points; 3rd head-to-head goal difference; 4th head-to-head goals scored; 5th goal difference; 6th number of goals scored; 7th Fair-play points

==== Results summary ====
Overall								Home						Away					
Pld	W	D	L	GF	GA	GD	Pts	W	D	L	GF	GA	GD	W	D	L	GF	GA	GD
42	14	14	14	39	47	−8	56	9	7	5	20	15	+5	5	7	9	19	32	−13

Source: BDFutbol

==== Results by round ====
Round	1	2	3	4	5	6	7	8	9	10	11	12	13	14	15	16	17	18	19	20	21	22	23	24	25	26	27	28	29	30	31	32	33	34	35	36	37	38	39	40	41	42
Ground	H	A	A	H	A	H	A	H	A	H	A	H	A	H	A	H	A	H	A	H	A	A	H	H	A	H	A	H	A	H	A	H	A	H	A	H	A	H	A	H	A	H
Result	D	L	L	L	D	D	L	D	L	L	D	W	W	W	D	W	L	L	L	W	D	W	L	D	W	W	L	D	W	W	W	W	D	D	D	D	L	W	D	W	L	L
Position	14	15	20	20	21	20	22	20	22	22	22	22	20	20	20	18	20	20	21	20	20	18	20	20	20	18	17	18	15	13	11	11	11	11	11	11	12	12	12	10	12	13

Source: BDFutbol
A = Away; H = Home; W = Win; D = Draw; L = Loss

==== Matches ====
21 August 1999 1	Leganés	1–1	Mérida	Leganés

29 August 1999 2	Atlético Madrid B	4–3	Leganés	Madrid

4 September 1999 3	Extremadura	2–0	Leganés	Extremadura

12 September 1999 4	Leganés	0–1	Osasuna	Leganés

19 September 1999 5	Compostela	0–0	Leganés

26 September 1999 6	Leganés	1–1	Córdoba	Leganés

2 October 1999 7	Las Palmas	7–1	Leganés	Las Palmas

10 October 1999 8	Leganés	0–0	Logroñés	Leganés

13 October 1999 9	Lleida	2–0	Leganés	Lleida

16 October 1999 10	Leganés	1–2	Salamanca

24 October 1999 11	Albacete	0–0	Leganés

31 October 1999 12	Leganés	1–0	Badajoz

6 November 1999 13	Getafe	0–1	Leganés

13 November 1999 14	Leganés	3–1	Eibar

21 November 1999 15	Elche	1–1	Leganés

28 November 1999 16	Leganés	1–0	Villarreal

5 December 1999 17	Levante	5–2	Leganés

12 December 1999 18	Leganés	0–4	Tenerife

19 December 1999 19	Sporting Gijón	3–0	Leganés

5 January 2000 20	Leganés	2–0	Recreativo

8 January 2000 21	Toledo	1–1	Leganés

16 January 2000 22	Mérida	0–4	Leganés

22 January 2000 23	Leganés	0–1	Atlético Madrid B

30 January 2000 24	Leganés	0–0	Extremadura

6 February 2000 25	Osasuna	1–2	Leganés

13 February 2000 26	Leganés	3–1	Compostela

20 February 2000 27	Córdoba	2–1	Leganés

27 February 2000 28	Leganés	0–0	Las Palmas

5 March 2000 29	Logroñés	0–1	Leganés

12 March 2000 30	Leganés	1–0	Lleida

19 March 2000 31	Salamanca	0–1	Leganés

26 March 2000 32	Leganés	1–0	Albacete

2 April 2000 33	Badajoz	1–1	Leganés

8 April 2000 34	Leganés	0–0	Getafe

15 April 2000 35	Eibar	0–0	Leganés

22 April 2000 36	Leganés	0–0	Elche

30 April 2000 37	Villarreal	2–0	Leganés

7 May 2000 38	Leganés	2–0	Levante

14 May 2000 39	Tenerife	0–0	Leganés

21 May 2000 40	Leganés	2–1	Sporting Gijón

28 May 2000 41	Recreativo	1–0	Leganés

3 June 2000 42	Leganés	1–2	Toledo

=== Copa del Rey ===
==== First round ====
10 November 1999 First leg	Villarreal	0–1	Leganés

1 December 1999 Second leg	Leganés	0–3 (a.e.t.) (1–3 agg.)	Villarreal
