= 1999–2000 CD Logroñés season =

CD Logroñés
1999–2000 season
- Head coach: Marco Antonio Boronat
- Segunda División: 20th (relegated)
- Copa del Rey: Second round

The 1999–2000 season was the 60th season in the existence of CD Logroñés and the club's third consecutive season in the second division of Spanish football.

== Competitions ==
=== Overall record ===
Competition	First match	Last match	Starting round	Final position	Record							
Competition	First match	Last match	Starting round	Final position	Pld	W	D	L	GF	GA	GD	Win %
Segunda División	22 August 1999	4 June 2000	Matchday 1	20th	42	11	13	18	55	52	+3	26.19
Copa del Rey	10 December 1999		First round	Second round	4	3	0	1	7	5	+2	75.00
Total					46	14	13	19	62	57	+5	30.43

Source: BDFutbol

=== Segunda División ===
==== League table ====
Pos	Team	Pld	W	D	L	GF	GA	GD	Pts	Promotion or relegation
18	Compostela	42	10	19	13	50	53	−3	49	
19	Getafe	42	13	9	20	39	51	−12	48	
20	Logroñés (R)	42	11	13	18	52	56	−4	46	Relegation to Segunda División B (Note: CD Logroñés was relegated to Tercera División for not paying its players.)
21	Recreativo	42	12	9	21	40	54	−14	45	Re-admitted (Note: CP Mérida was relegated to Segunda División B for not paying its players. Then, Recreativo de Huelva was readmitted in Segunda División.)
22	Toledo (R)	42	10	10	22	34	55	−21	40	Relegation to Segunda División B

Rules for classification: 1st points; 2nd head-to-head points; 3rd head-to-head goal difference; 4th head-to-head goals scored; 5th goal difference; 6th number of goals scored; 7th Fair-play points
(R) Relegated

==== Results summary ====
Overall								Home						Away					
Pld	W	D	L	GF	GA	GD	Pts	W	D	L	GF	GA	GD	W	D	L	GF	GA	GD
0	0	0	0	0	0	0	0	0	0	0	0	0	0	0	0	0	0	0	0

==== Results by round ====
Round	1
Ground	
Result	
Position	

A = Away; H = Home; W = Win; D = Draw; L = Loss

==== Matches ====
22 August 1999 1	Logroñés	3–3	Levante

28 August 1999 2	Tenerife	2–1	Logroñés

5 September 1999 3	Logroñés	2–3	Sporting Gijón

12 September 1999 4	Recreativo	1–1	Logroñés

19 September 1999 5	Logroñés	2–1	Toledo

26 September 1999 6	Mérida	2–2	Logroñés

3 October 1999 7	Logroñés	1–1	Atlético Madrid B

10 October 1999 8	Leganés	0–0	Logroñés

12 October 1999 9	Logroñés	3–1	Osasuna

17 October 1999 10	Compostela	1–0	Logroñés

24 October 1999 11	Logroñés	2–2	Córdoba

30 October 1999 12	Las Palmas	1–0	Logroñés

7 November 1999 13	Extremadura	3–1	Logroñés

13 November 1999 14	Logroñés	1–0	Lleida

21 November 1999 15	Salamanca	3–0	Logroñés

28 November 1999 16	Logroñés	4–1	Albacete

5 December 1999 17	Badajoz	2–1	Logroñés

11 December 1999 18	Logroñés	1–0	Getafe

18 December 1999 19	Eibar	2–5	Logroñés

4 January 2000 20	Logroñés	2–2	Elche

8 January 2000 21	Villarreal	1–0	Logroñés

16 January 2000 22	Levante	1–0	Logroñés

23 January 2000 23	Logroñés	0–0	Tenerife

30 January 2000 24	Sporting Gijón	1–4	Logroñés

6 February 2000 25	Logroñés	0–3	Recreativo

13 February 2000 26	Toledo	2–1	Logroñés

20 February 2000 27	Logroñés	1–2	Mérida

27 February 2000 28	Atlético Madrid B	0–1	Logroñés

5 March 2000 29	Logroñés	0–1	Leganés

11 March 2000 30	Osasuna	2–0	Logroñés

19 March 2000 31	Logroñés	3–1	Compostela

25 March 2000 32	Córdoba	1–0	Logroñés

1 April 2000 33	Logroñés	1–1	Las Palmas

8 April 2000 34	Logroñés	1–1	Extremadura

15 April 2000 35	Lleida	1–0	Logroñés

23 April 2000 36	Logroñés	0–0	Salamanca

30 April 2000 37	Albacete	2–2	Logroñés

7 May 2000 38	Logroñés	2–0	Badajoz

14 May 2000 39	Getafe	2–2	Logroñés

21 May 2000 40	Logroñés	0–1	Eibar

28 May 2000 41	Elche	2–1	Logroñés

4 June 2000 42	Logroñés	1–0	Villarreal

=== Copa del Rey ===
==== First round ====
10 November 1999 First leg	Logroñés	2–1	Real Sociedad

1 December 1999 Second leg	Real Sociedad	0–1 (1–4 agg.)	Logroñés

==== Second round ====
15 December 1999 First leg	Logroñés	3–2	Oviedo

12 January 2000 Second leg	Oviedo	2–1 (4–4 (a) agg.)	Logroñés
