= 1999–2000 CD Tenerife season =

CD Tenerife
1999–2000 season
- Stadium: Estadio Heliodoro Rodríguez López
- Segunda División: 14th
- Copa del Rey: Second round

The 1999–2000 season was the 88th season in the existence of CD Tenerife and the club's first season back in the second division of Spanish football.

== Competitions ==
=== La Liga ===
==== League table ====
| Pos | Team | Pld | W | D | L | GF | GA | GD | Pts |
|---|---|---|---|---|---|---|---|---|---|
| 12 | Córdoba | 42 | 15 | 12 | 15 | 46 | 49 | −3 | 57 |
| 13 | Leganés | 42 | 14 | 14 | 14 | 39 | 47 | −8 | 56 |
| 14 | Tenerife | 42 | 14 | 13 | 15 | 50 | 48 | +2 | 55 |
| 15 | Elche | 42 | 12 | 17 | 13 | 48 | 58 | −10 | 53 |
| 16 | Badajoz | 42 | 9 | 24 | 9 | 38 | 39 | −1 | 51 |

Rules for classification: 1st points; 2nd head-to-head points; 3rd head-to-head goal difference; 4th head-to-head goals scored; 5th goal difference; 6th number of goals scored; 7th Fair-play points

==== Results summary ====
| Overall | | | | | | | | Home | | | | | | Away | | | | | |
| Pld | W | D | L | GF | GA | GD | Pts | W | D | L | GF | GA | GD | W | D | L | GF | GA | GD |
|---|---|---|---|---|---|---|---|---|---|---|---|---|---|---|---|---|---|---|---|
| 0 | 0 | 0 | 0 | 0 | 0 | 0 | 0 | 0 | 0 | 0 | 0 | 0 | 0 | 0 | 0 | 0 | 0 | 0 | 0 |

==== Results by round ====
| Round | 1 |
|---|---|
| Ground | |
| Result | |
| Position | |

A = Away; H = Home; W = Win; D = Draw; L = Loss

==== Matches ====
| 21 August 1999 1 | Las Palmas | 2–0 | Tenerife | Las Palmas |

| 28 August 1999 2 | Tenerife | 2–1 | Logroñés | Santa Cruz de Tenerife |
| | | | | Stadium: Estadio Heliodoro Rodríguez López |

| 5 September 1999 3 | Lleida | 1–2 | Tenerife | Lleida |

| 12 September 1999 4 | Tenerife | 1–1 | Salamanca | Santa Cruz de Tenerife |
| | | | | Stadium: Estadio Heliodoro Rodríguez López |

| 18 September 1999 5 | Albacete | 1–0 | Tenerife | Albacete |

| 26 September 1999 6 | Tenerife | 0–1 | Badajoz | Santa Cruz de Tenerife |
| | | | | Stadium: Estadio Heliodoro Rodríguez López |

| 2 October 1999 7 | Getafe | 2–2 | Tenerife | Getafe |

| 9 October 1999 8 | Tenerife | 1–1 | Eibar | Santa Cruz de Tenerife |
| | | | | Stadium: Estadio Heliodoro Rodríguez López |

| 12 October 1999 9 | Elche | 1–3 | Tenerife | Elche |

| 17 October 1999 10 | Tenerife | 3–1 | Villarreal | Santa Cruz de Tenerife |
| | | | | Stadium: Estadio Heliodoro Rodríguez López |

| 24 October 1999 11 | Levante | 2–1 | Tenerife | Valencia |

| 31 October 1999 12 | Tenerife | 3–0 | Extremadura | Santa Cruz de Tenerife |
| | | | | Stadium: Estadio Heliodoro Rodríguez López |

| 7 November 1999 13 | Tenerife | 2–1 | Sporting Gijón | Santa Cruz de Tenerife |
| | | | | Stadium: Estadio Heliodoro Rodríguez López |

| 13 November 1999 14 | Recreativo | 2–0 | Tenerife | Huelva |

| 21 November 1999 15 | Tenerife | 3–0 | Toledo | Santa Cruz de Tenerife |
| | | | | Stadium: Estadio Heliodoro Rodríguez López |

| 28 November 1999 16 | Mérida | 2–0 | Tenerife |

| 4 December 1999 17 | Tenerife | 2–1 | Atlético Madrid B |

| 12 December 1999 18 | Leganés | 0–4 | Tenerife |

| 19 December 1999 19 | Tenerife | 1–1 | Osasuna |

| 5 January 2000 20 | Compostela | 2–1 | Tenerife |

| 9 January 2000 21 | Tenerife | 1–1 | Córdoba |

| 16 January 2000 22 | Tenerife | 1–2 | Las Palmas |

| 23 January 2000 23 | Logroñés | 0–0 | Tenerife |

| 30 January 2000 24 | Tenerife | 2–1 | Lleida |

| 6 February 2000 25 | Salamanca | 3–0 | Tenerife |

| 13 February 2000 26 | Tenerife | 2–2 | Albacete |

| 20 February 2000 27 | Badajoz | 0–2 | Tenerife |

| 27 February 2000 28 | Tenerife | 4–0 | Getafe |

| 4 March 2000 29 | Eibar | 0–1 | Tenerife |

| 11 March 2000 30 | Tenerife | 1–0 | Elche |

| 19 March 2000 31 | Villarreal | 0–0 | Tenerife |

| 26 March 2000 32 | Tenerife | 1–1 | Levante |

| 2 April 2000 33 | Extremadura | 0–0 | Tenerife |

| 8 April 2000 34 | Sporting Gijón | 2–0 | Tenerife |

| 16 April 2000 35 | Tenerife | 1–2 | Recreativo |

| 22 April 2000 36 | Toledo | 1–1 | Tenerife |

| 30 April 2000 37 | Tenerife | 0–1 | Mérida |

| 6 May 2000 38 | Atlético Madrid B | 2–1 | Tenerife |

| 14 May 2000 39 | Tenerife | 0–0 | Leganés | Santa Cruz de Tenerife |

| 20 May 2000 40 | Osasuna | 5–0 | Tenerife | Pamplona |

| 28 May 2000 41 | Tenerife | 0–0 | Compostela | Santa Cruz de Tenerife |

| 4 June 2000 42 | Córdoba | 2–1 | Tenerife | Córdoba |

=== Copa del Rey ===
==== First round ====
| 10 November 1999 First leg | Zamora | 2–2 | Tenerife | Zamora |

| 1 December 1999 Second leg | Tenerife | 4–0 (6–2 agg.) | Zamora | Santa Cruz de Tenerife |

==== Second round ====
| 15 December 1999 First leg | Tenerife | 2–2 | Compostela | Santa Cruz de Tenerife |

| 11 January 2000 Second leg | Compostela | 2–0 (4–2 agg.) | Tenerife | Santiago de Compostela |
