= 1999–2000 SD Eibar season =

SD Eibar
1999–2000 season
- Segunda División: 11th
- Copa del Rey: Second round

The 1999–2000 season was the 60th season in the existence of SD Eibar and the club's 12th consecutive season in the second division of Spanish football. The season covered the period from 1 July 1999 to 30 June 2000.

== Competitions ==
=== La Liga ===
==== League table ====
Pos	Team	Pld	W	D	L	GF	GA	GD	Pts
9	Sporting Gijón	42	17	9	16	54	48	+6	60
10	Albacete	42	15	14	13	51	53	−2	59
11	Eibar	42	14	15	13	48	49	−1	57
12	Córdoba	42	15	12	15	46	49	−3	57
13	Leganés	42	14	14	14	39	47	−8	56

Rules for classification: 1st points; 2nd head-to-head points; 3rd head-to-head goal difference; 4th head-to-head goals scored; 5th goal difference; 6th number of goals scored; 7th Fair-play points

==== Results summary ====
Overall								Home						Away					
Pld	W	D	L	GF	GA	GD	Pts	W	D	L	GF	GA	GD	W	D	L	GF	GA	GD
0	0	0	0	0	0	0	0	0	0	0	0	0	0	0	0	0	0	0	0

==== Results by round ====
Round	1
Ground	
Result	
Position	

A = Away; H = Home; W = Win; D = Draw; L = Loss

==== Matches ====
22 August 1999 1	Albacete	3–1	Eibar	Albacete

29 August 1999 2	Eibar	0–0	Badajoz	Eibar

5 September 1999 3	Getafe	1–1	Eibar	Getafe

11 September 1999 4	Eibar	0–1	Extremadura	Eibar

18 September 1999 5	Eibar	1–1	Elche	Eibar

26 September 1999 6	Villarreal	1–5	Eibar	Villarreal

3 October 1999 7	Eibar	4–2	Levante	Eibar

9 October 1999 8	Tenerife	1–1	Eibar	Santa Cruz de Tenerife

13 October 1999 9	Eibar	1–1	Sporting Gijón	Eibar

16 October 1999 10	Recreativo	0–1	Eibar	Huelva

24 October 1999 11	Eibar	2–1	Toledo	Eibar

31 October 1999 12	Mérida	3–1	Eibar

7 November 1999 13	Eibar	2–0	Atlético Madrid B	Eibar

13 November 1999 14	Leganés	3–1	Eibar

21 November 1999 15	Eibar	4–1	Osasuna	Eibar

27 November 1999 16	Compostela	4–1	Eibar

5 December 1999 17	Eibar	1–1	Córdoba

11 December 1999 18	Las Palmas	1–1	Eibar

18 December 1999 19	Eibar	2–5	Logroñés

4 January 2000 20	Lleida	1–1	Eibar

8 January 2000 21	Eibar	1–0	Salamanca

16 January 2000 22	Eibar	0–1	Albacete

23 January 2000 23	Badajoz	0–1	Eibar

30 January 2000 24	Eibar	1–0	Getafe

6 February 2000 25	Extremadura	3–0	Eibar

13 February 2000 26	Elche	2–0	Eibar

20 February 2000 27	Eibar	2–1	Villarreal

27 February 2000 28	Levante	0–0	Eibar

4 March 2000 29	Eibar	0–1	Tenerife

12 March 2000 30	Sporting Gijón	1–1	Eibar

19 March 2000 31	Eibar	0–0	Recreativo

26 March 2000 32	Toledo	1–2	Eibar

2 April 2000 33	Eibar	0–0	Mérida

9 April 2000 34	Atlético Madrid B	2–0	Eibar

15 April 2000 35	Eibar	0–0	Leganés

22 April 2000 36	Osasuna	2–0	Eibar

30 April 2000 37	Eibar	0–0	Compostela

6 May 2000 38	Córdoba	1–1	Eibar

13 May 2000 39	Eibar	4–1	Las Palmas	Eibar

21 May 2000 40	Logroñés	0–1	Eibar	Logroño

28 May 2000 41	Eibar	2–0	Lleida	Eibar

4 June 2000 42	Salamanca	2–1	Eibar	Salamanca

=== Copa del Rey ===
==== First round ====
10 November 1999 First leg	Eibar	1–0	Toledo

1 December 1999 Second leg	Toledo	0–0 (0–1 agg.)	Eibar

==== Second round ====
15 December 1999 First leg	Lleida	0–0	Eibar

12 January 2000 Second leg	Eibar	1–1 (1–1 (a) agg.)	Lleida
