= 1999–2000 SD Compostela season =

SD Compostela
1999–2000 season
- Segunda División: 18th
- Copa del Rey: Quarter-finals

The 1999–2000 season was the 72nd season in the existence of SD Compostela and the club's second consecutive season in the second division of Spanish football.

== Competitions ==
=== Segunda División ===
==== League table ====
Pos	Team	Pld	W	D	L	GF	GA	GD	Pts	Promotion or relegation
16	Badajoz	42	9	24	9	38	39	−1	51	
17	Atlético Madrid B (R)	42	13	11	18	43	57	−14	50	Relegation to Segunda División B (Note: Atlético de Madrid B was relegated for being the reserve team of Atlético de Madrid, who were relegated from Primera División.)
18	Compostela	42	10	19	13	50	53	−3	49	
19	Getafe	42	13	9	20	39	51	−12	48	
20	Logroñés (R)	42	11	13	18	52	56	−4	46	Relegation to Segunda División B (Note: CD Logroñés was relegated to Tercera División for not paying its players.)

Rules for classification: 1st points; 2nd head-to-head points; 3rd head-to-head goal difference; 4th head-to-head goals scored; 5th goal difference; 6th number of goals scored; 7th Fair-play points
(R) Relegated

==== Results summary ====
Overall								Home						Away					
Pld	W	D	L	GF	GA	GD	Pts	W	D	L	GF	GA	GD	W	D	L	GF	GA	GD
0	0	0	0	0	0	0	0	0	0	0	0	0	0	0	0	0	0	0	0

==== Results by round ====
Round	1
Ground	
Result	
Position	

A = Away; H = Home; W = Win; D = Draw; L = Loss

==== Matches ====
22 August 1999 1	Compostela	3–0	Recreativo

29 August 1999 2	Toledo	0–1	Compostela

4 September 1999 3	Compostela	1–2	Mérida

11 September 1999 4	Atlético Madrid B	1–3	Compostela

19 September 1999 5	Compostela	0–0	Leganés

26 September 1999 6	Osasuna	2–2	Compostela

3 October 1999 7	Extremadura	3–1	Compostela

9 October 1999 8	Compostela	0–2	Córdoba

13 October 1999 9	Las Palmas	2–1	Compostela

17 October 1999 10	Compostela	1–0	Logroñés

24 October 1999 11	Lleida	3–1	Compostela

31 October 1999 12	Compostela	2–2	Salamanca

7 November 1999 13	Albacete	2–2	Compostela

14 November 1999 14	Compostela	1–2	Badajoz

21 November 1999 15	Getafe	4–1	Compostela

27 November 1999 16	Compostela	4–1	Eibar

5 December 1999 17	Elche	1–1	Compostela

11 December 1999 18	Compostela	1–1	Villarreal

19 December 1999 19	Levante	0–0	Compostela

5 January 2000 20	Compostela	2–1	Tenerife

9 January 2000 21	Sporting Gijón	1–1	Compostela

16 January 2000 22	Recreativo	0–0	Compostela

23 January 2000 23	Compostela	0–0	Toledo

29 January 2000 24	Mérida	0–1	Compostela

6 February 2000 25	Compostela	1–1	Atlético Madrid B

13 February 2000 26	Leganés	3–1	Compostela

20 February 2000 27	Compostela	1–2	Osasuna

27 February 2000 28	Compostela	2–0	Extremadura

5 March 2000 29	Córdoba	1–0	Compostela

11 March 2000 30	Compostela	0–2	Las Palmas

19 March 2000 31	Logroñés	3–1	Compostela

26 March 2000 32	Compostela	1–2	Lleida

2 April 2000 33	Salamanca	0–0	Compostela

9 April 2000 34	Compostela	1–1	Albacete

16 April 2000 35	Badajoz	2–2	Compostela

23 April 2000 36	Compostela	3–2	Getafe

30 April 2000 37	Eibar	0–0	Compostela

7 May 2000 38	Compostela	1–1	Elche

13 May 2000 39	Villarreal	1–1	Compostela

21 May 2000 40	Compostela	4–1	Levante

28 May 2000 41	Tenerife	0–0	Compostela

4 June 2000 42	Compostela	1–1	Sporting Gijón

=== Copa del Rey ===
==== First round ====
10 November 1999 First leg	Compostela	4–2	Numancia	Santiago de Compostela

1 December 1999 Second leg	Numancia	3–2 (5–6 agg.)	Compostela	Soria

==== Second round ====
15 December 1999 First leg	Tenerife	2–2	Compostela	Santa Cruz de Tenerife

11 January 2000 Second leg	Compostela	2–0 (4–2 agg.)	Tenerife	Santiago de Compostela

==== Round of 16 ====
19 January 2000 First leg	Compostela	3–0	Villarreal	Santiago de Compostela

1 February 2000 Second leg	Villarreal	3–0 (a.e.t.) (3–3 agg.) (2–4 p)	Compostela	Villarreal

==== Quarter-finals ====
9 February 2000 First leg	Espanyol	5–1	Compostela	Barcelona

16 February 2000 Second leg	Compostela	1–0 (2–5 agg.)	Espanyol	Santiago de Compostela
