= 1999–2000 Recreativo de Huelva season =

Recreativo de Huelva
1999–2000 season
- Segunda División: 21st
- Copa del Rey: First round

The 1999–2000 season was the 111th season in the existence of Recreativo de Huelva and the club's second consecutive season in the second division of Spanish football.

== Competitions ==
=== Segunda División ===
==== League table ====
Pos	Team	Pld	W	D	L	GF	GA	GD	Pts	Promotion or relegation
18	Compostela	42	10	19	13	50	53	−3	49	
19	Getafe	42	13	9	20	39	51	−12	48	
20	Logroñés (R)	42	11	13	18	52	56	−4	46	Relegation to Segunda División B (Note: CD Logroñés was relegated to Tercera División for not paying its players.)
21	Recreativo	42	12	9	21	40	54	−14	45	Re-admitted (Note: CP Mérida was relegated to Segunda División B for not paying its players. Then, Recreativo de Huelva was readmitted in Segunda División.)
22	Toledo (R)	42	10	10	22	34	55	−21	40	Relegation to Segunda División B

Rules for classification: 1st points; 2nd head-to-head points; 3rd head-to-head goal difference; 4th head-to-head goals scored; 5th goal difference; 6th number of goals scored; 7th Fair-play points
(R) Relegated

==== Results summary ====
Overall								Home						Away					
Pld	W	D	L	GF	GA	GD	Pts	W	D	L	GF	GA	GD	W	D	L	GF	GA	GD
0	0	0	0	0	0	0	0	0	0	0	0	0	0	0	0	0	0	0	0

==== Results by round ====
Round	1
Ground	
Result	
Position	

A = Away; H = Home; W = Win; D = Draw; L = Loss

==== Matches ====
22 August 1999 1	Compostela	3–0	Recreativo

28 August 1999 2	Recreativo	1–0	Córdoba

5 September 1999 3	Las Palmas	1–2	Recreativo

12 September 1999 4	Recreativo	1–1	Logroñés

18 September 1999 5	Lleida	0–1	Recreativo

26 September 1999 6	Recreativo	0–1	Salamanca

3 October 1999 7	Albacete	1–1	Recreativo

9 October 1999 8	Recreativo	2–2	Badajoz

12 October 1999 9	Getafe	1–0	Recreativo

16 October 1999 10	Recreativo	0–1	Eibar

24 October 1999 11	Elche	3–1	Recreativo

31 October 1999 12	Recreativo	0–4	Villarreal

7 November 1999 13	Levante	2–0	Recreativo

13 November 1999 14	Recreativo	2–0	Tenerife

21 November 1999 15	Sporting Gijón	3–1	Recreativo

28 November 1999 16	Recreativo	1–1	Extremadura

5 December 1999 17	Recreativo	3–0	Toledo

12 December 1999 18	Mérida	2–0	Recreativo

19 December 1999 19	Recreativo	1–2	Atlético Madrid B

5 January 2000 20	Leganés	2–0	Recreativo

8 January 2000 21	Recreativo	0–1	Osasuna

16 January 2000 22	Recreativo	0–0	Compostela

22 January 2000 23	Córdoba	2–1	Recreativo

29 January 2000 24	Recreativo	0–2	Las Palmas

6 February 2000 25	Logroñés	0–3	Recreativo

13 February 2000 26	Recreativo	4–0	Lleida

20 February 2000 27	Salamanca	0–1	Recreativo

27 February 2000 28	Recreativo	3–3	Albacete

4 March 2000 29	Badajoz	0–0	Recreativo

11 March 2000 30	Recreativo	2–4	Getafe

19 March 2000 31	Eibar	0–0	Recreativo

26 March 2000 32	Recreativo	1–2	Elche

2 April 2000 33	Villarreal	1–1	Recreativo

9 April 2000 34	Recreativo	1–0	Levante

16 April 2000 35	Tenerife	1–2	Recreativo

23 April 2000 36	Recreativo	0–1	Sporting Gijón

29 April 2000 37	Extremadura	1–0	Recreativo

7 May 2000 38	Toledo	0–2	Recreativo

14 May 2000 39	Recreativo	0–3	Mérida

21 May 2000 40	Atlético Madrid B	1–0	Recreativo

28 May 2000 41	Recreativo	1–0	Leganés

4 June 2000 42	Osasuna	2–1	Recreativo

=== Copa del Rey ===
==== First round ====
10 November 1999 First leg	Recreativo	0–0	Zaragoza

1 December 1999 Second leg	Zaragoza	4–0 (4–0 agg.)	Recreativo
