= 1999–2000 CD Badajoz season =

CD Badajoz
1999–2000 season
- Segunda División: 16th
- Copa del Rey: First round

The 1999–2000 season was the 95th season in the existence of CD Badajoz and the club's eighth consecutive season in the second division of Spanish football.

== Competitions ==
=== La Liga ===
==== League table ====
Pos	Team	Pld	W	D	L	GF	GA	GD	Pts	Promotion or relegation
14	Tenerife	42	14	13	15	50	48	+2	55	
15	Elche	42	12	17	13	48	58	−10	53	
16	Badajoz	42	9	24	9	38	39	−1	51	
17	Atlético Madrid B (R)	42	13	11	18	43	57	−14	50	Relegation to Segunda División B (Note: Atlético de Madrid B was relegated for being reserve team of Atlético de Madrid, relegated from Primera División.)
18	Compostela	42	10	19	13	50	53	−3	49	

Rules for classification: 1st points; 2nd head-to-head points; 3rd head-to-head goal difference; 4th head-to-head goals scored; 5th goal difference; 6th number of goals scored; 7th Fair-play points
(R) Relegated

==== Results summary ====
Overall								Home						Away					
Pld	W	D	L	GF	GA	GD	Pts	W	D	L	GF	GA	GD	W	D	L	GF	GA	GD
42	9	24	9	38	39	−1	51	4	11	6	19	24	−5	5	13	3	19	15	+4

==== Results by round ====
Round	1
Ground	
Result	
Position	

A = Away; H = Home; W = Win; D = Draw; L = Loss

==== Matches ====
22 August 1999 1	Badajoz	2–1	Getafe

29 August 1999 2	Eibar	0–0	Badajoz

4 September 1999 3	Badajoz	1–1	Elche

12 September 1999 4	Villarreal	0–0	Badajoz

19 September 1999 5	Badajoz	1–1	Levante

26 September 1999 6	Tenerife	0–1	Badajoz

3 October 1999 7	Badajoz	2–1	Sporting Gijón

9 October 1999 8	Recreativo	2–2	Badajoz

12 October 1999 9	Badajoz	1–1	Toledo

17 October 1999 10	Mérida	0–0	Badajoz

24 October 1999 11	Badajoz	1–1	Atlético Madrid B

31 October 1999 12	Leganés	1–0	Badajoz

7 November 1999 13	Badajoz	0–1	Osasuna

14 November 1999 14	Compostela	1–2	Badajoz

21 November 1999 15	Badajoz	0–0	Córdoba

27 November 1999 16	Las Palmas	0–0	Badajoz

5 December 1999 17	Badajoz	2–1	Logroñés

12 December 1999 18	Lleida	2–2	Badajoz

18 December 1999 19	Badajoz	2–2	Salamanca

5 January 2000 20	Albacete	0–1	Badajoz

9 January 2000 21	Badajoz	2–0	Extremadura

16 January 2000 22	Getafe	0–2	Badajoz

23 January 2000 23	Badajoz	0–1	Eibar

30 January 2000 24	Elche	0–0	Badajoz

6 February 2000 25	Badajoz	1–1	Villarreal

12 February 2000 26	Levante	1–1	Badajoz

20 February 2000 27	Badajoz	0–2	Tenerife

26 February 2000 28	Sporting Gijón	0–0	Badajoz

4 March 2000 29	Badajoz	0–0	Recreativo

12 March 2000 30	Toledo	2–0	Badajoz

19 March 2000 31	Badajoz	0–3	Mérida

26 March 2000 32	Atlético Madrid B	0–0	Badajoz

2 April 2000 33	Badajoz	1–1	Leganés

9 April 2000 34	Osasuna	0–0	Badajoz

16 April 2000 35	Badajoz	2–2	Compostela

22 April 2000 36	Córdoba	0–4	Badajoz

29 April 2000 37	Badajoz	0–2	Las Palmas

7 May 2000 38	Logroñés	2–0	Badajoz

14 May 2000 39	Badajoz	0–0	Lleida

21 May 2000 40	Salamanca	2–2	Badajoz

27 May 2000 41	Badajoz	1–2	Albacete

4 June 2000 42	Extremadura	2–2	Badajoz

=== Copa del Rey ===
==== First round ====
10 November 1999 First leg	Badajoz	1–1	Las Palmas

1 December 1999 Second leg	Las Palmas	1–0 (2–1 agg.)	Badajoz
