= 1999–2000 Córdoba CF season =

Córdoba CF
1999–2000 season
- Manager: José Tomás Escalante
- Stadium: Estadio Nuevo Arcángel
- Segunda División: 12th
- Copa del Rey: First round

The 1999–2000 season was the 49th season in the existence of Córdoba CF and the club's first season back in the second division of Spanish football since 1983.

== Competitions ==
=== La Liga ===
==== League table ====
Pos	Team	Pld	W	D	L	GF	GA	GD	Pts
10	Albacete	42	15	14	13	51	53	−2	59
11	Eibar	42	14	15	13	48	49	−1	57
12	Córdoba	42	15	12	15	46	49	−3	57
13	Leganés	42	14	14	14	39	47	−8	56
14	Tenerife	42	14	13	15	50	48	+2	55

Rules for classification: 1st points; 2nd head-to-head points; 3rd head-to-head goal difference; 4th head-to-head goals scored; 5th goal difference; 6th number of goals scored; 7th Fair-play points

==== Results summary ====
Overall								Home						Away					
Pld	W	D	L	GF	GA	GD	Pts	W	D	L	GF	GA	GD	W	D	L	GF	GA	GD
0	0	0	0	0	0	0	0	0	0	0	0	0	0	0	0	0	0	0	0

==== Results by round ====
Round	1
Ground	
Result	
Position	

A = Away; H = Home; W = Win; D = Draw; L = Loss

==== Matches ====
22 August 1999 1	Córdoba	0–1	Sporting Gijón	Córdoba
				Stadium: Estadio Nuevo Arcángel

28 August 1999 2	Recreativo	1–0	Córdoba	Huelva

5 September 1999 3	Córdoba	0–2	Toledo	Córdoba
				Stadium: Estadio Nuevo Arcángel

12 September 1999 4	Mérida	0–0	Córdoba

19 September 1999 5	Córdoba	3–0	Atlético Madrid B	Córdoba
				Stadium: Estadio Nuevo Arcángel

26 September 1999 6	Leganés	1–1	Córdoba

2 October 1999 7	Córdoba	2–1	Osasuna	Córdoba
				Stadium: Estadio Nuevo Arcángel

9 October 1999 8	Compostela	0–2	Córdoba

12 October 1999 9	Extremadura	0–0	Córdoba

17 October 1999 10	Córdoba	1–2	Las Palmas	Córdoba
				Stadium: Estadio Nuevo Arcángel

24 October 1999 11	Logroñés	2–2	Córdoba

30 October 1999 12	Córdoba	1–4	Lleida	Córdoba
				Stadium: Estadio Nuevo Arcángel

6 November 1999 13	Salamanca	4–1	Córdoba

14 November 1999 14	Córdoba	3–2	Albacete	Córdoba
				Stadium: Estadio Nuevo Arcángel

21 November 1999 15	Badajoz	0–0	Córdoba

28 November 1999 16	Córdoba	0–1	Getafe	Córdoba
				Stadium: Estadio Nuevo Arcángel

5 December 1999 17	Eibar	1–1	Córdoba

12 December 1999 18	Córdoba	2–1	Elche

19 December 1999 19	Villarreal	2–1	Córdoba

4 January 2000 20	Córdoba	1–1	Levante

9 January 2000 21	Tenerife	1–1	Córdoba

16 January 2000 22	Sporting Gijón	1–0	Córdoba

22 January 2000 23	Córdoba	2–1	Recreativo

30 January 2000 24	Toledo	0–3	Córdoba

6 February 2000 25	Córdoba	3–0	Mérida

13 February 2000 26	Atlético Madrid B	0–0	Córdoba

20 February 2000 27	Córdoba	2–1	Leganés

27 February 2000 28	Osasuna	0–2	Córdoba

5 March 2000 29	Córdoba	1–0	Compostela

11 March 2000 30	Córdoba	2–1	Extremadura

18 March 2000 31	Las Palmas	1–1	Córdoba

25 March 2000 32	Córdoba	1–0	Logroñés

2 April 2000 33	Lleida	1–0	Córdoba

9 April 2000 34	Córdoba	0–0	Salamanca

16 April 2000 35	Albacete	1–0	Córdoba

22 April 2000 36	Córdoba	0–4	Badajoz

30 April 2000 37	Getafe	0–1	Córdoba

6 May 2000 38	Córdoba	1–1	Eibar	Córdoba
				Stadium: Estadio Nuevo Arcángel

13 May 2000 39	Elche	2–1	Córdoba	Elche

20 May 2000 40	Córdoba	2–4	Villarreal	Córdoba
				Stadium: Estadio Nuevo Arcángel

28 May 2000 41	Levante	3–0	Córdoba	Valencia

4 June 2000 42	Córdoba	2–1	Tenerife	Córdoba
				Stadium: Estadio Nuevo Arcángel

=== Copa del Rey ===
==== Preliminary round ====
1 September 1999 Preliminary round	Dos Hermanas	1–3	Córdoba

==== First round ====
10 November 1999 First leg	Córdoba	1–1	Espanyol	Córdoba
				Stadium: Estadio Nuevo Arcángel

1 December 1999 Second leg	Espanyol	2–0 (3–1 agg.)	Córdoba	Barcelona
