= 1999–2000 UE Lleida season =

UE Lleida
1999–2000 season
- President: Antoni Gausí
- Head coach: Víctor Muñoz
- Stadium: Camp d'Esports
- Segunda División: 5th
- Copa del Rey: Round of 16
- Biggest defeat: Recreativo 4–0 Lleida

The 1999–2000 season was the 61st season in the existence of UE Lleida and the club's sixth consecutive season in the second division of Spanish football.

== Competitions ==
=== Overall record ===
Competition	First match	Last match	Starting round	Final position	Record							
Competition	First match	Last match	Starting round	Final position	Pld	W	D	L	GF	GA	GD	Win %
Segunda División	21 August 1999	4 June 2000	Matchday 1	5th	42	18	9	15	66	52	+14	42.86
Copa del Rey	10 November 1999	2 February 2000	First round	Round of 16	6	1	3	2	9	10	−1	16.67
Total					48	19	12	17	75	62	+13	39.58

Source: BDFutbol

=== Segunda División ===
==== League table ====
Pos	Team	Pld	W	D	L	GF	GA	GD	Pts	Promotion or relegation
3	Villarreal (P)	42	18	12	12	61	46	+15	66	Promotion to La Liga
4	Salamanca	42	18	12	12	54	43	+11	66	
5	Lleida	42	18	9	15	66	52	+14	63	
6	Mérida (R)	42	16	15	11	41	34	+7	63	Relegation to Segunda División B (Note: CP Mérida was relegated to Segunda División B for not paying its players. Then, Recreativo de Huelva was readmitted in Segunda División.)
7	Levante	42	16	13	13	55	52	+3	61	

Source: BDFutbol; RSSSF
Rules for classification: 1st points; 2nd head-to-head points; 3rd head-to-head goal difference; 4th head-to-head goals scored; 5th goal difference; 6th number of goals scored; 7th Fair-play points
(P) Promoted; (R) Relegated

==== Results summary ====
Overall								Home						Away					
Pld	W	D	L	GF	GA	GD	Pts	W	D	L	GF	GA	GD	W	D	L	GF	GA	GD
0	0	0	0	0	0	0	0	0	0	0	0	0	0	0	0	0	0	0	0

==== Results by round ====
Round	1
Ground	
Result	
Position	

A = Away; H = Home; W = Win; D = Draw; L = Loss

==== Matches ====
21 August 1999 1	Lleida	2–2	Villarreal

28 August 1999 2	Levante	3–0	Lleida

5 September 1999 3	Lleida	1–2	Tenerife

12 September 1999 4	Sporting Gijón	2–1	Lleida

18 September 1999 5	Lleida	0–1	Recreativo

26 September 1999 6	Toledo	0–3	Lleida

3 October 1999 7	Lleida	0–0	Mérida

9 October 1999 8	Atlético Madrid B	1–2	Lleida

13 October 1999 9	Lleida	2–0	Leganés

17 October 1999 10	Osasuna	3–1	Lleida

24 October 1999 11	Lleida	3–1	Compostela

30 October 1999 12	Córdoba	1–4	Lleida

7 November 1999 13	Lleida	4–1	Las Palmas

13 November 1999 14	Logroñés	1–0	Lleida

21 November 1999 15	Extremadura	1–1	Lleida

27 November 1999 16	Lleida	1–2	Salamanca

4 December 1999 17	Albacete	2–2	Lleida

12 December 1999 18	Lleida	2–2	Badajoz

19 December 1999 19	Getafe	2–1	Lleida

4 January 2000 20	Lleida	1–1	Eibar

8 January 2000 21	Elche	1–3	Lleida

16 January 2000 22	Villarreal	2–3	Lleida

22 January 2000 23	Lleida	2–0	Levante

30 January 2000 24	Tenerife	2–1	Lleida

6 February 2000 25	Lleida	4–1	Sporting Gijón

13 February 2000 26	Recreativo	4–0	Lleida

20 February 2000 27	Lleida	1–0	Toledo

27 February 2000 28	Mérida	0–0	Lleida

5 March 2000 29	Lleida	3–0	Atlético Madrid B

12 March 2000 30	Leganés	1–0	Lleida

19 March 2000 31	Lleida	1–0	Osasuna

26 March 2000 32	Compostela	1–2	Lleida

2 April 2000 33	Lleida	1–0	Córdoba

8 April 2000 34	Las Palmas	1–0	Lleida

15 April 2000 35	Lleida	1–0	Logroñés

23 April 2000 36	Lleida	2–3	Extremadura

30 April 2000 37	Salamanca	2–1	Lleida

6 May 2000 38	Lleida	2–2	Albacete

14 May 2000 39	Badajoz	0–0	Lleida

21 May 2000 40	Lleida	3–0	Getafe

28 May 2000 41	Eibar	2–0	Lleida

3 June 2000 42	Lleida	5–2	Elche

=== Copa del Rey ===
==== First round ====
10 November 1999 First leg	Coria	2–4	Lleida

1 December 1999 Second leg	Lleida	1–1 (5–3 agg.)	Coria

==== Second round ====
15 December 1999 First leg	Lleida	0–0	Eibar

12 January 2000 Second leg	Eibar	1–1 (1–1 (a) agg.)	Lleida

==== Round of 16 ====
19 January 1999 First leg	Lleida	2–3	Rayo Vallecano	Lleida
20:30				Attendance: 4,000; Referee: Javier Turienzo Álvarez

2 February 2000 Second leg	Rayo Vallecano	3–1 (6–3 agg.)	Lleida	Madrid
21:00				Referee: Juan Brito Arceo
