= 1999–2000 Getafe CF season =

Getafe CF
1999–2000 season
- Manager: Santiago Martín Prado
- Segunda División: 19th
- Copa del Rey: Second round
- Biggest win: Getafe 4–1 Compostela
- Biggest defeat: Tenerife 4–0 Getafe

The 1999–2000 season was the 17th season in the existence of Getafe CF and the club's first season back in the second division of Spanish football. The season covered the period from 1 July 1999 to 30 June 2000.

== Competitions ==
=== Segunda División ===
==== League table ====
Pos	Team	Pld	W	D	L	GF	GA	GD	Pts	Promotion or relegation
17	Atlético Madrid B (R)	42	13	11	18	43	57	−14	50	Relegation to Segunda División B (Note: Atlético de Madrid B was relegated for being the reserve team of Atlético de Madrid, who were relegated from Primera División.)
18	Compostela	42	10	19	13	50	53	−3	49	
19	Getafe	42	13	9	20	39	51	−12	48	
20	Logroñés (R)	42	11	13	18	52	56	−4	46	Relegation to Segunda División B (Note: CD Logroñés was relegated to Tercera División for not paying its players.)
21	Recreativo	42	12	9	21	40	54	−14	45	Re-admitted (Note: CP Mérida was relegated to Segunda División B for not paying its players. Then, Recreativo de Huelva was readmitted in Segunda División.)

Rules for classification: 1st points; 2nd head-to-head points; 3rd head-to-head goal difference; 4th head-to-head goals scored; 5th goal difference; 6th number of goals scored; 7th Fair-play points
(R) Relegated

==== Results summary ====
Overall								Home						Away					
Pld	W	D	L	GF	GA	GD	Pts	W	D	L	GF	GA	GD	W	D	L	GF	GA	GD
0	0	0	0	0	0	0	0	0	0	0	0	0	0	0	0	0	0	0	0

==== Results by round ====
Round	1	2	3	4	5	6	7	8	9	10	11	12	13	14	15
Ground															
Result	L	L	D	D	L	L	D	L	W	D	W	W	L	W	W
Position															

A = Away; H = Home; W = Win; D = Draw; L = Loss

==== Matches ====
22 August 1999 1	Badajoz	2–1	Getafe

28 August 1999 2	Getafe	1–2	Extremadura

5 September 1999 3	Getafe	1–1	Eibar

11 September 1999 4	Elche	1–1	Getafe

19 September 1999 5	Getafe	0–2	Villarreal

25 September 1999 6	Levante	2–0	Getafe

2 October 1999 7	Getafe	2–2	Tenerife

9 October 1999 8	Sporting Gijón	1–0	Getafe

12 October 1999 9	Getafe	1–0	Recreativo

17 October 1999 10	Toledo	0–0	Getafe

24 October 1999 11	Getafe	1–0	Mérida

1 November 1999 12	Atlético Madrid B	1–2	Getafe

6 November 1999 13	Getafe	0–1	Leganés

14 November 1999 14	Osasuna	0–1	Getafe

21 November 1999 15	Getafe	4–1	Compostela

28 November 1999 16	Córdoba	0–1	Getafe

5 December 1999 17	Getafe	2–1	Las Palmas

11 December 1999 18	Logroñés	1–0	Getafe

19 December 1999 19	Getafe	2–1	Lleida

4 January 2000 20	Salamanca	1–1	Getafe

9 January 2000 21	Getafe	1–1	Albacete

16 January 2000 22	Getafe	0–2	Badajoz

23 January 2000 23	Extremadura	1–0	Getafe

30 January 2000 24	Eibar	1–0	Getafe

5 February 2000 25	Getafe	1–2	Elche

13 February 2000 26	Villarreal	2–1	Getafe

19 February 2000 27	Getafe	0–1	Levante

27 February 2000 28	Tenerife	4–0	Getafe

5 March 2000 29	Getafe	1–0	Sporting Gijón

11 March 2000 30	Recreativo	2–4	Getafe

19 March 2000 31	Getafe	2–0	Toledo

26 March 2000 32	Mérida	1–0	Getafe

1 April 2000 33	Getafe	2–0	Atlético Madrid B

8 April 2000 34	Leganés	0–0	Getafe

16 April 2000 35	Getafe	0–0	Osasuna

23 April 2000 36	Compostela	3–2	Getafe

30 April 2000 37	Getafe	0–1	Córdoba

6 May 2000 38	Las Palmas	2–0	Getafe

14 May 2000 39	Getafe	2–2	Logroñés

21 May 2000 40	Lleida	3–0	Getafe

28 May 2000 41	Getafe	1–3	Salamanca

4 June 2000 42	Albacete	0–1	Getafe

=== Copa del Rey ===
==== Preliminary round ====
1 September 1999 Preliminary round	Lanzarote	1–1 (a.e.t.) (4–5 p)	Getafe	Lanzarote
				Stadium: Ciudad Deportiva de Lanzarote

==== First round ====
10 November 1999 First leg	Ourense	1–0	Getafe	Ourense
				Stadium: Estadio de O Couto

1 December 1999 Second leg	Getafe	1–2 (1–3 agg.)	Ourense	Getafe
				Stadium: Coliseum Alfonso Pérez
