= 1999–2000 Atlético Madrid B season =

Atlético de Madrid B
1999–2000 season
- President: Jesús Gil
- Head coach: Fernando Zambrano
- Segunda División: 17th
- Biggest win: Atlético Madrid B 3–0 Elche

The 1999–2000 season was the 37th season in the existence of Atlético de Madrid B and the club's fourth consecutive season in the second division of Spanish football. The season covered the period from 1 July 1999 to 30 June 2000.

== Competitions ==
=== Segunda División ===
==== League table ====
Pos	Team	Pld	W	D	L	GF	GA	GD	Pts	Promotion or relegation
15	Elche	42	12	17	13	48	58	−10	53	
16	Badajoz	42	9	24	9	38	39	−1	51	
17	Atlético Madrid B (R)	42	13	11	18	43	57	−14	50	Relegation to Segunda División B (Note: Atlético de Madrid B was relegated for being reserve team of Atlético de Madrid, relegated from Primera División.)
18	Compostela	42	10	19	13	50	53	−3	49	
19	Getafe	42	13	9	20	39	51	−12	48	

Rules for classification: 1st points; 2nd head-to-head points; 3rd head-to-head goal difference; 4th head-to-head goals scored; 5th goal difference; 6th number of goals scored; 7th Fair-play points
(R) Relegated

==== Results summary ====
Overall								Home						Away					
Pld	W	D	L	GF	GA	GD	Pts	W	D	L	GF	GA	GD	W	D	L	GF	GA	GD
42	13	11	18	43	57	−14	50	8	5	8	27	27	0	5	6	10	16	30	−14

==== Results by round ====
Round	1	2	3	4	5	6	7	8	9	10	11	12	13	14	15
Ground															
Result	L	W	L	L	L	D	D	L	W	L	D	L	L	W	W
Position															

A = Away; H = Home; W = Win; D = Draw; L = Loss

==== Matches ====
22 August 1999 1	Extremadura	1–0	Atlético Madrid B	Extremadura

29 August 1999 2	Atlético Madrid B	4–3	Leganés	Madrid

4 September 1999 3	Osasuna	1–0	Atlético Madrid B	Pamplona

11 September 1999 4	Atlético Madrid B	1–3	Compostela	Madrid

19 September 1999 5	Córdoba	3–0	Atlético Madrid B

25 September 1999 6	Atlético Madrid B	0–0	Las Palmas	Madrid

3 October 1999 7	Logroñés	1–1	Atlético Madrid B

9 October 1999 8	Atlético Madrid B	1–2	Lleida	Madrid

12 October 1999 9	Salamanca	1–2	Atlético Madrid B	Salamanca

17 October 1999 10	Atlético Madrid B	0–1	Albacete

24 October 1999 11	Badajoz	1–1	Atlético Madrid B

1 November 1999 12	Atlético Madrid B	1–2	Getafe

7 November 1999 13	Eibar	2–0	Atlético Madrid B

14 November 1999 14	Atlético Madrid B	3–0	Elche

21 November 1999 15	Villarreal	1–2	Atlético Madrid B

28 November 1999 16	Atlético Madrid B	2–4	Levante

4 December 1999 17	Tenerife	2–1	Atlético Madrid B

11 December 1999 18	Atlético Madrid B	0–1	Sporting Gijón

19 December 1999 19	Recreativo	1–2	Atlético Madrid B

5 January 2000 20	Atlético Madrid B	2–1	Toledo

9 January 2000 21	Mérida	0–1	Atlético Madrid B

15 January 2000 22	Atlético Madrid B	4–2	Extremadura

22 January 2000 23	Leganés	0–1	Atlético Madrid B

30 January 2000 24	Atlético Madrid B	1–1	Osasuna

6 February 2000 25	Compostela	1–1	Atlético Madrid B

13 February 2000 26	Atlético Madrid B	0–0	Córdoba

19 February 2000 27	Las Palmas	1–1	Atlético Madrid B

27 February 2000 28	Atlético Madrid B	0–1	Logroñés

5 March 2000 29	Lleida	3–0	Atlético Madrid B

11 March 2000 30	Atlético Madrid B	2–1	Salamanca

19 March 2000 31	Albacete	1–0	Atlético Madrid B

26 March 2000 32	Atlético Madrid B	0–0	Badajoz

1 April 2000 33	Getafe	2–0	Atlético Madrid B

9 April 2000 34	Atlético Madrid B	2–0	Eibar

16 April 2000 35	Elche	1–1	Atlético Madrid B

23 April 2000 36	Atlético Madrid B	1–4	Villarreal

29 April 2000 37	Levante	3–0	Atlético Madrid B

6 May 2000 38	Atlético Madrid B	2–1	Tenerife

14 May 2000 39	Sporting Gijón	3–1	Atlético Madrid B

21 May 2000 40	Atlético Madrid B	1–0	Recreativo

28 May 2000 41	Toledo	1–1	Atlético Madrid B

4 June 2000 42	Atlético Madrid B	0–0	Mérida
