= Pedro José Lorenzo =

Spanish footballer

Pedro José
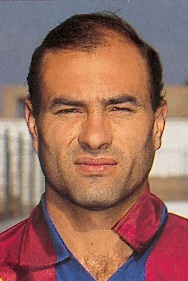

Personal information
- Full name: Pedro José Lorenzo Galán
- Date of birth: 19 November 1967 (age 58)
- Place of birth: Torremejía, Spain
- Height: 1.80 m (5 ft 11 in)
- Position: Defensive midfielder

Youth career
- Pizarro

Senior career*
Years	Team	Apps	(Gls)
1985–2004	Extremadura	502	(62)
2004–2005	Mérida	33	(1)
2005–2010	Imperio Mérida		

Managerial career
- 2010–2011: Extremadura (assistant)
- 2011–2014: Arroyo (assistant)
- 2014–2019: Extremadura (assistant)
- * Club domestic league appearances and goals

Pedro José Lorenzo Galán (born 19 November 1967), known as Pedro José, is a Spanish former professional footballer who played as a defensive midfielder.

He played 169 matches in the Segunda División with Extremadura over six seasons (nine goals), adding 68 games and two goals in La Liga with the same club, which he represented for 19 years.

== Club career ==
Born in Torremejía, Province of Badajoz, Pedro José's career was closely associated with CF Extremadura, and he only played with teams from his native region in 25 years as a senior. He represented his main club in all four major levels of Spanish football, helping it to promote twice to La Liga, in 1996 and in 1998, and appearing in more than 600 competitive matches during his spell (72 goals).

Pedro José made his debut in the top flight on 1 September 1996 aged 28 years and 10 months, playing the full 90 minutes in a 2–1 away loss against Hércules CF. He scored the first of his two goals in the competition on 6 April of the following year, helping to a 3–0 home win over CD Logroñés, but Extremadura were ultimately relegated at the end of the season, as would be the case two years later.

Pedro José left the side in 2004 at the age of 36, and played a further six years in amateur football, with Mérida UD and Imperio de Mérida CP. Subsequently, he returned to the renamed Extremadura UD as assistant coach.
