= Imperio de Mérida CP =

Imperio de Mérida
- Full name: Imperio de Mérida; Club Polideportivo
- Nickname(s): Imperialistas
- Founded: 1955
- Ground: Estadio Romano, Mérida, Extremadura, Spain
- Capacity: 15,000
- 2010–11: 3ª – Group 14, 20th of 20
Home colours	Away colours

Imperio de Mérida Club Polideportivo is a Spanish football club based in Mérida, in the autonomous community of Extremadura. Founded in 1955, it held home games at Estadio Romano, with a capacity for 15,000 spectators.

In 2011, after seven consecutive seasons in Tercera División, the club ceased to compete in organized football, and later only featured in youth football.

== Season to season ==
Season	Tier	Division	Place	Copa del Rey
1958–59	4	1ª Reg.	5th	
1959–60	4	1ª Reg.	3rd	
1960–61	4	1ª Reg.	9th	
1961–62	4	1ª Reg.	10th	
1962–63	4	1ª Reg.	10th	
1963–64	5	2ª Reg.		
1964–65	5	2ª Reg.		
1965–66	5	2ª Reg.		
1966–67	4	1ª Reg.	1st	
1967–68	3	3ª	18th	
1968–69	4	1ª Reg.	3rd	
1969–70	4	1ª Reg.	3rd	
1970–71	4	1ª Reg.	4th	
1971–72	4	1ª Reg.	5th	
1972–73	4	1ª Reg.	13th	
1973–74	4	1ª Reg.	17th	
1974–75	4	Reg. Pref.	9th	
1975–76	4	Reg. Pref.	14th	

Season	Tier	Division	Place	Copa del Rey
1976–77	4	Reg. Pref.	13th	
1977–78	5	Reg. Pref.	11th	
1978–79	5	Reg. Pref.	15th	
1979–80	5	Reg. Pref.	20th	
1980–1998	DNP			
1998–99	6	1ª Reg.	1st	
1999–2000	5	Reg. Pref.	7th	
2000–01	5	Reg. Pref.	1st	
2001–02	4	3ª	18th	
2002–03	5	Reg. Pref.	2nd	
2003–04	5	Reg. Pref.	1st	
2004–05	4	3ª	5th	
2005–06	4	3ª	7th	
2006–07	4	3ª	3rd	
2007–08	4	3ª	11th	
2008–09	4	3ª	10th	
2009–10	4	3ª	10th	
2010–11	4	3ª	20th	

- 9 seasons in Tercera División
