= Iván Rosado =

Spanish footballer

Personal information
- Full name: Juan Manuel Rosado Mojarro
- Date of birth: 24 April 1974 (age 52)
- Place of birth: Huelva, Spain
- Height: 1.74 m (5 ft 8 1/2 in)
- Position: Striker

Youth career
- 1990–1991: San Juan
- 1991–1992: Ayamonte

Senior career*
Years	Team	Apps	(Gls)
1992–1997	Recreativo	129	(69)
1997–1999	Rayo Vallecano	51	(11)
1999–2006	Osasuna	143	(37)
2005–2006	→ Xerez (loan)	20	(2)
2007–2008	Málaga	25	(4)
Total		368	(123)

Managerial career
- 2018–2019: Recreativo B
- * Club domestic league appearances and goals

Juan Manuel Rosado Mojarro (born 24 April 1974), commonly known as Iván Rosado, is a Spanish former professional footballer who played as a striker.

Over five seasons, he achieved La Liga totals of 122 matches and 26 goals with Osasuna (six years in total). He represented four other teams during a 16-year career, starting in 1992 with Recreativo.

== Club career ==
Rosado was born in Huelva, Andalusia. After starting playing for local Recreativo de Huelva in the Segunda División B he signed for two seasons with Rayo Vallecano of Segunda División, promoting in his first year but scoring only twice in 20 league games in the process.

Rosado's most steady and fruitful period came with Pamplona's CA Osasuna: after being the team's top scorer in his first season with 11 goals, as they returned to La Liga after six years– whilst Recreativo were relegated – he repeated the feat the following campaign (at 14), helping the Navarrese barely avoid relegation and taking his tally in his first three top-flight seasons to 25 goals, in 100 appearances.

After an uneventful loan at Xerez CD, Rosado was released by Osasuna in September 2006. After nearly one year out of football, he moved to Málaga CF. He featured scarcely during his one-and-a-half season spell, as the club returned to the top tier in 2008.

Rosado had a trial at UD Melilla in August 2008, but nothing came of it and he eventually retired from the game aged 34. In 11 years in the two major levels, he amassed totals of 239 matches and 54 goals.
