= Estadio Salto del Caballo =

Multi-use stadium in Spain

Coordinates: 39.8690°N 4.0181°W

Salto del Caballo
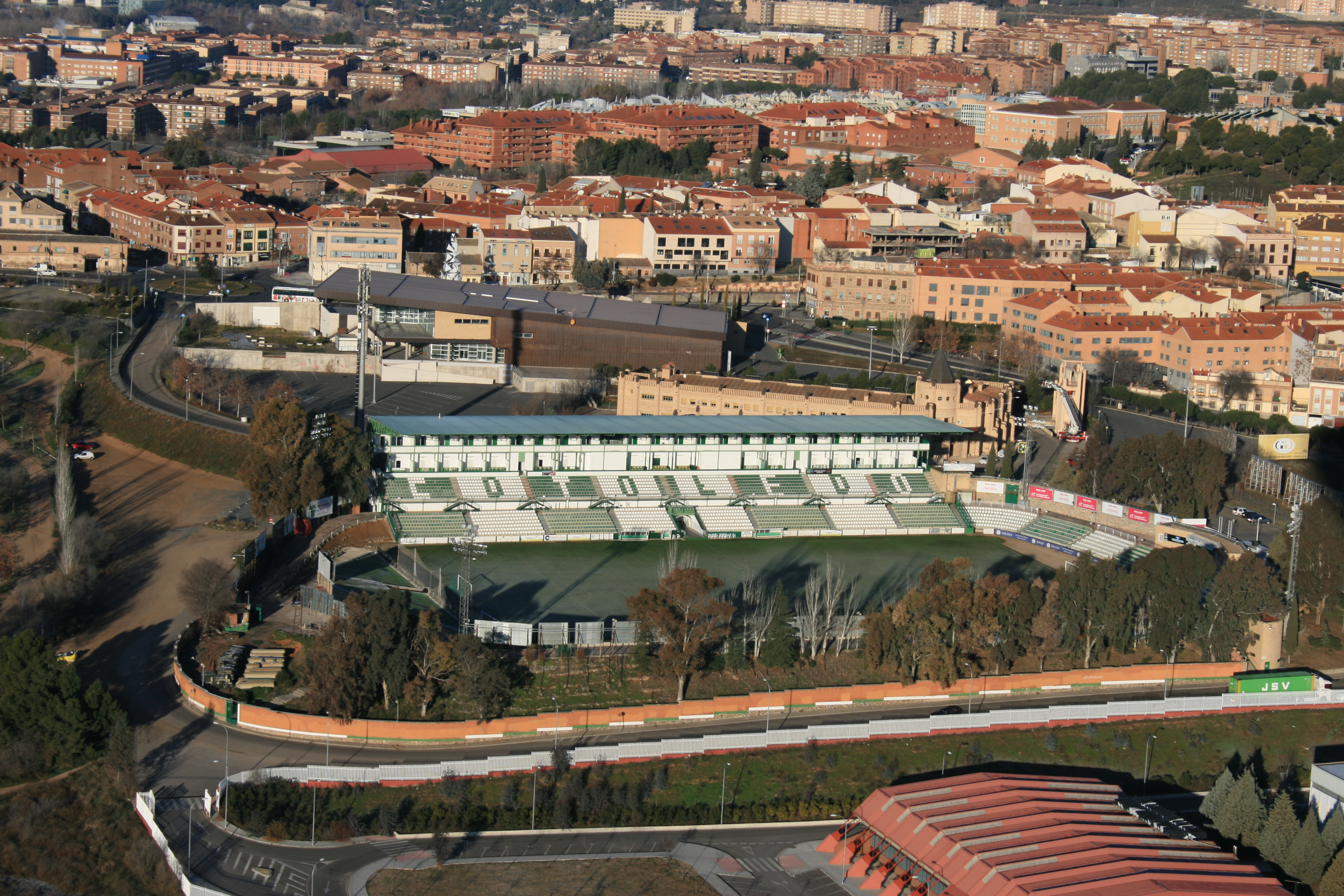
- Interactive map of Salto del Caballo
- Full name: Estadio Municipal Salto del Caballo
- Location: Toledo, Spain
- Capacity: 5,500
- Surface: Grass
- Field size: 105 m × 75 m (344 ft × 246 ft)

Construction
- Opened: 1973

Tenant
- CD Toledo

The Estadio Salto del Caballo is a multi-use stadium located in Toledo, Castile-La Mancha, Spain. It is currently used for football matches and is the home stadium of CD Toledo.
