= Estadio Romano =

Stadium in Spain

Coordinates: 38°54′50.16″N 6°20′11.06″W

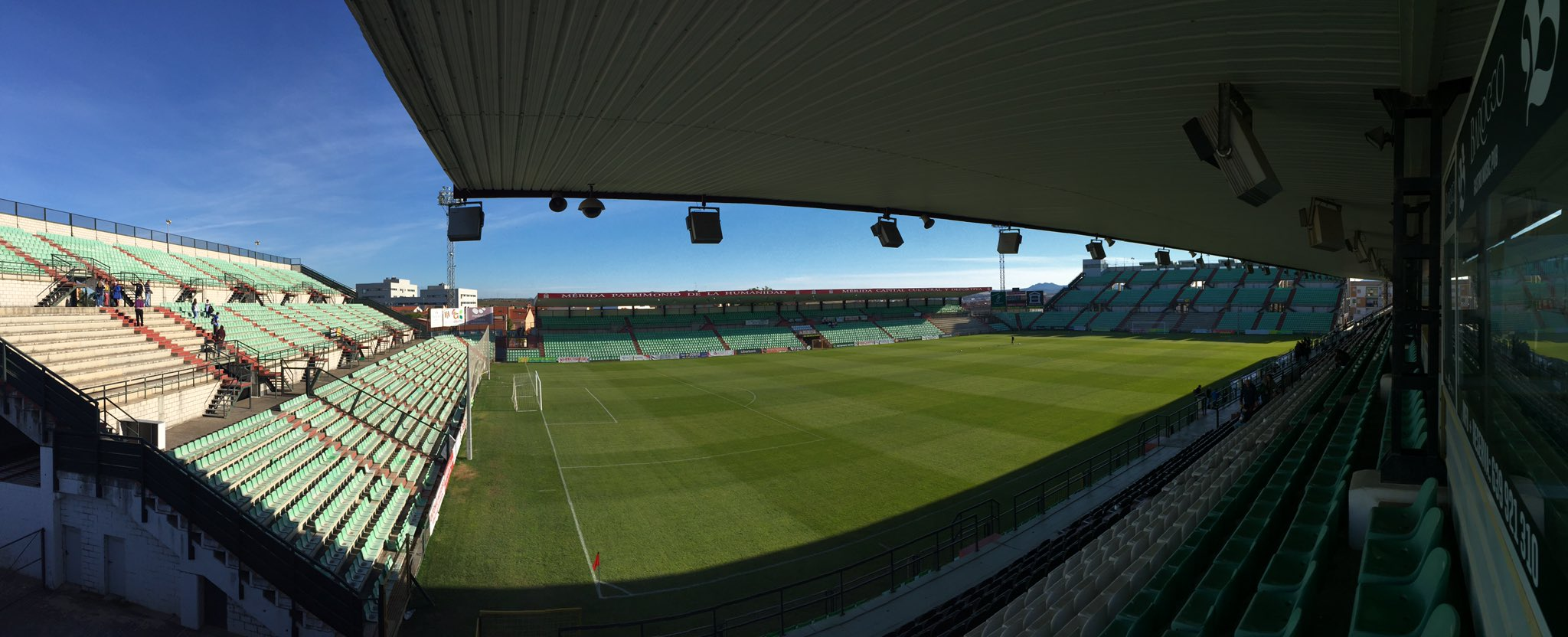
- Interactive map of Estadio Romano
- Full name: Estadio Romano
- Former names: Estadio Romano José Fouto
- Location: Mérida, Spain
- Owner: Ayuntamiento de Mérida
- Operator: AD Mérida
- Capacity: 14,600
- Surface: Grass
- Field size: 106 x 70 m

Construction
- Opened: 1954

Tenants
- AD Mérida (2013–present); Mérida UD (1990–2013); CP Mérida (1954–2000); Spain national football team (selected matches)

Estadio Romano (English: Roman Stadium) is a multi-use stadium in Mérida, Spain. It is currently used for football matches and is the home ground of Mérida AD. The stadium holds 14,600 people and opened in 1954.

On 9 September 2009, the stadium hosted the Spain national team as they defeated Estonia 3-0 to qualify for the 2010 FIFA World Cup, which they went on to win. Mayor of Mérida Ángel Calle said "We want to use the Estonia match to promote Mérida and Extremadura, we will welcome the players as if they were 21st-century gladiators."

The Spain national under-21 team played two games at this stadium, against Cyprus in 1989 and against Czechoslovakia in 1991.
