= Estadio Francisco de la Hera =

Football stadium in Almendralejo, Spain

- Interactive map of Estadio Francisco de la Hera
- Former names: Estadio Francisco de la Hera
- Location: Almendralejo, Spain
- Coordinates: 38°41′03.88″N 6°24′52.58″W
- Owner: Municipality of Almendralejo
- Capacity: 11,580
- Surface: grass
- Field size: 105 x 69 m

Construction
- Opened: Old - October 12, 1951; New - September 9, 1996

Tenants
- CD Extremadura (2022–); Extremadura UD (2007–2022); CF Extremadura (1996–2010)

Estadio Francisco de la Hera is a football stadium in Almendralejo, Spain. It is the home ground of CD Extremadura 1924.

CF Extremadura’s first permanent ground was called Campo de Santa Aurora which was on Camino Alange. This was used from 1928 to 1935 when they moved the short distance to Campo Santa Elvira. In 1950, the idea of building a municipal stadium was formed. They played at a site adjacent to the proposed stadium called Los Cañizos for just over one season played. The inaugural match was on 12 October 1951; CF Extremadura played against Sevilla FC at Estadio Francisco de la Hera.

The stadium remained relatively unchanged until its demolition in 1996 to construct a new stadium. The 1996 Estadio Francisco de la Hera has a seating capacity of 11,580.

In July 2019, Extremadura UD and the city council of Almendralejo announced the rebranding of the stadium to Estadio Ciudad de Almendralejo. There were opinions against the change, the club held a referendum between its members.

== Return to professional football ==
Extremadura UD's promotion returned professional football to the region after fifteen years without it. The club had been created in 2007 as the heir to CF Extremadura, which had spent two seasons in Primera División, in 1996-97 and 1998-99. Extremadura UD achieved promotion to Segunda División on 24 June 2018 by drawing 0-0 away at Cartagena, which was enough after a 1-0 first-leg win at the Francisco de la Hera in Almendralejo.
