= 1999–2000 Segunda División =

69th season of the second-tier football league in Spain

Segunda División
- Season: 1999–2000
- Champions: UD Las Palmas
- Promoted: UD Las Palmas; CA Osasuna; Villarreal CF
- Relegated: CP Mérida; Atlético Madrid B CD Logroñés; CD Toledo
- Matches: 462
- Goals: 1,058 (2.29 per match)
- Top goalscorer: (Spain) Paco Salillas

The 1999–2000 Segunda División was the 69th edition since the establishment of the competition. 22 teams participated in the league. UD Las Palmas won the league.

The teams that promoted to La Liga were UD Las Palmas, Osasuna and Villarreal CF. The teams that relegated to Segunda División B were CP Mérida, Atlético de Madrid B, CD Logroñés and CD Toledo.

== Teams ==
Location of teams in Segunda División 1999-2000
Canary Islands

Team	Home city	Stadium	Capacity
Albacete	Albacete	Carlos Belmonte	18,000
Atlético Madrid B	Madrid	Cerro del Espino	3,900
Badajoz	Badajoz	Nuevo Vivero	15,198
Compostela	Santiago de Compostela	San Lázaro	12,000
Córdoba	Córdoba	Nuevo Arcángel	21,822
Eibar	Eibar	Ipurua	5,000
Elche	Elche	Martínez Valero	36,017
Extremadura	Almendralejo	Francisco de la Hera	11,580
Getafe	Getafe	Coliseum Alfonso Pérez	17,393
Las Palmas	Las Palmas	Insular	22,000
Leganés	Leganés	Butarque	8,138
Levante	Valencia	Ciutat de València	26,354
Lleida	Lleida	Camp d'Esports	13,500
Logroñés	Logroño	Las Gaunas	14,895
Mérida	Mérida	Romano	14,600
Osasuna	Pamplona	El Sadar	19,800
Recreativo de Huelva	Huelva	Colombino	13,000
Salamanca	Villares de la Reina	Helmántico	17,341
Sporting de Gijón	Gijón	El Molinón	25,885
Tenerife	Santa Cruz de Tenerife	Heliodoro Rodríguez López	20,000
Toledo	Toledo	Salto del Caballo	5,300
Villarreal	Villarreal	El Madrigal	22,000

=== Teams by Autonomous Community ===
	Autonomous community	Number of teams	Teams
1	Extremadura	3	Badajoz, Extremadura, Mérida
1	Madrid	3	Atlético Madrid B, Leganés, Getafe
1	Valencia	3	Elche, Levante, Villarreal
4	Andalusia	2	Córdoba, Recreativo
4	Canary Islands	2	Las Palmas, Tenerife
4	Castile-La Mancha	2	Albacete, Toledo
7	Asturias	1	Sporting
7	Basque Country	1	Eibar
7	Castile and León	1	Salamanca
7	Catalonia	1	Lleida
7	Galicia	1	Compostela
7	La Rioja	1	Logroñés
7	Navarre	1	Osasuna

== Final table ==
Pos	Team	Pld	W	D	L	GF	GA	GD	Pts	Promotion or relegation
1	Las Palmas (C, P)	42	20	12	10	60	41	+19	72	Promotion to La Liga
2	Osasuna (P)	42	20	7	15	50	36	+14	67	Promotion to La Liga
3	Villarreal (P)	42	18	12	12	61	46	+15	66	Promotion to La Liga
4	Salamanca	42	18	12	12	54	43	+11	66	
5	Lleida	42	18	9	15	66	52	+14	63	
6	Mérida (R)	42	16	15	11	41	34	+7	63	Relegation to Segunda División B (Note: CP Mérida was relegated to Segunda División B for not paying its players. Then, Recreativo de Huelva was readmitted in Segunda División.)
7	Levante	42	16	13	13	55	52	+3	61	
8	Extremadura	42	16	13	13	49	47	+2	61	
9	Sporting Gijón	42	17	9	16	54	48	+6	60	
10	Albacete	42	15	14	13	51	53	−2	59	
11	Eibar	42	14	15	13	48	49	−1	57	
12	Córdoba	42	15	12	15	46	49	−3	57	
13	Leganés	42	14	14	14	39	47	−8	56	
14	Tenerife	42	14	13	15	50	48	+2	55	
15	Elche	42	12	17	13	48	58	−10	53	
16	Badajoz	42	9	24	9	38	39	−1	51	
17	Atlético Madrid B (R)	42	13	11	18	43	57	−14	50	Relegation to Segunda División B (Note: Atlético de Madrid B was relegated for being the reserve team of Atlético de Madrid, who were relegated from Primera División.)
18	Compostela	42	10	19	13	50	53	−3	49	
19	Getafe	42	13	9	20	39	51	−12	48	
20	Logroñés (R)	42	11	13	18	52	56	−4	46	Relegation to Segunda División B (Note: CD Logroñés was relegated to Tercera División for not paying its players.)
21	Recreativo	42	12	9	21	40	54	−14	45	Re-admitted
22	Toledo (R)	42	10	10	22	34	55	−21	40	Relegation to Segunda División B

Source: BDFutbol; RSSSF
Rules for classification: 1st points; 2nd head-to-head points; 3rd head-to-head goal difference; 4th head-to-head goals scored; 5th goal difference; 6th number of goals scored; 7th Fair-play points
(C) Champions; (P) Promoted; (R) Relegated

== Results ==
Home \ Away	ALB	ATM	BAD	COM	CÓR	EIB	ELC	EXT	GET	LPA	LEG	LEV	LLE	LOG	MÉR	OSA	REC	SAL	SPG	TEN	TOL	VIL
Albacete	—	1–0	0–1	2–2	1–0	3–1	1–1	3–1	0–1	1–1	0–0	2–0	2–2	2–2	0–2	2–1	1–1	1–0	1–2	1–0	2–1	0–2
Atlético B	0–1	—	0–0	1–3	0–0	2–0	3–0	4–2	1–2	0–0	4–3	2–4	1–2	0–1	0–0	1–1	1–0	2–1	0–1	2–1	2–1	1–4
Badajoz	1–2	1–1	—	2–2	0–0	0–1	1–1	2–0	2–1	0–2	1–1	1–1	0–0	2–1	0–3	0–1	0–0	2–2	2–1	0–2	1–1	1–1
Compostela	1–1	1–1	1–2	—	0–2	4–1	1–1	2–0	3–2	0–2	0–0	4–1	1–2	1–0	1–2	1–2	3–0	2–2	1–1	2–1	0–0	1–1
Córdoba	3–2	3–0	0–4	1–0	—	1–1	2–1	2–1	0–1	1–2	2–1	1–1	1–4	1–0	3–0	2–1	2–1	0–0	0–1	2–1	0–2	2–4
Eibar	0–1	2–0	0–0	0–0	1–1	—	1–1	0–1	1–0	4–1	0–0	4–2	2–0	2–5	0–0	4–1	0–0	1–0	1–1	0–1	2–1	2–1
Elche	1–1	1–1	0–0	1–1	2–1	2–0	—	1–1	1–1	0–3	1–1	1–1	1–3	2–1	2–1	1–3	3–1	2–2	2–1	1–3	1–0	1–0
Extremadura	3–0	1–0	2–2	3–1	0–0	3–0	1–1	—	1–0	2–1	2–0	1–1	1–1	3–1	0–0	1–0	1–0	1–0	2–2	0–0	1–2	4–1
Getafe	1–1	2–0	0–2	4–1	0–1	1–1	1–2	1–2	—	2–1	0–1	0–1	2–1	2–2	1–0	0–0	1–0	1–3	1–0	2–2	2–0	0–2
Las Palmas	2–1	1–1	0–0	2–1	1–1	1–1	4–1	0–1	2–0	—	7–1	2–1	1–0	1–0	2–0	0–2	1–2	0–2	1–1	2–0	0–0	2–1
Leganés	1–0	0–1	1–0	3–1	1–1	3–1	0–0	0–0	0–0	0–0	—	2–0	1–0	0–0	1–1	0–1	2–0	1–2	2–1	0–4	1–2	1–0
Levante	2–0	3–0	1–1	0–0	3–0	0–0	2–1	1–1	2–0	1–1	5–2	—	3–0	1–0	3–1	2–1	2–0	2–3	0–2	2–1	1–0	0–0
Lleida	2–2	3–0	2–2	3–1	1–0	1–1	5–2	2–3	3–0	4–1	2–0	2–0	—	1–0	0–0	1–0	0–1	1–2	4–1	1–2	1–0	2–2
Logroñés	4–1	1–1	2–0	3–1	2–2	0–1	2–2	1–1	1–0	1–1	0–1	3–3	1–0	—	1–2	3–1	0–3	0–0	2–3	0–0	2–1	1–0
Mérida	1–1	0–1	0–0	0–1	0–0	3–1	1–1	1–0	1–0	3–0	0–4	1–0	0–0	2–2	—	2–0	2–0	1–2	1–0	2–0	1–1	1–1
Osasuna	0–1	1–0	0–0	2–2	0–2	2–0	0–1	2–0	0–1	1–0	1–2	2–0	3–1	2–0	0–0	—	2–1	1–0	1–0	5–0	3–0	3–1
Recreativo	3–3	1–2	2–2	0–0	1–0	0–1	1–2	1–1	2–4	0–2	1–0	1–0	4–0	1–1	0–3	0–1	—	0–1	0–1	2–0	3–0	0–4
Salamanca	2–1	1–2	2–2	0–0	4–1	2–1	2–1	2–1	1–1	0–2	0–1	3–0	2–1	3–0	0–0	1–0	0–1	—	3–2	3–0	0–0	0–2
Sporting	1–2	3–1	0–0	1–1	1–0	1–1	0–2	1–0	1–0	1–2	3–0	4–0	2–1	1–4	1–2	1–1	3–1	2–0	—	2–0	0–1	1–2
Tenerife	2–2	2–1	0–1	0–0	1–1	1–1	1–0	3–0	4–0	1–2	0–0	1–1	2–1	2–1	0–1	1–1	1–2	1–1	2–1	—	3–0	3–1
Toledo	0–2	1–1	2–0	0–1	0–3	1–2	2–0	2–0	0–0	1–3	1–1	0–1	0–3	2–1	3–0	0–1	0–2	3–0	0–0	1–1	—	1–3
Villarreal CF	2–0	1–2	0–0	1–1	2–1	1–5	1–0	3–0	2–1	1–1	2–0	1–1	2–3	1–0	1–0	1–0	1–1	0–0	1–2	0–0	4–1	—

Source: BDFutbol; RSSSF
Legend: Blue = home team win; Yellow = draw; Red = away team win.

=== Positions by round ===
Team ╲ Round	1	2	3	4	5	6	7	8	9	10	11	12	13	14	15	16	17	18	19	20	21	22	23	24	25	26	27	28	29	30	31	32	33	34	35	36	37	38	39	40	41	42
Albacete	3	5	13	13	13	8	7	6	6																																	
Atlético B	18	10	14	15	19	19	19	19	19																																	
Badajoz	5	8	11	12	11	7	4	5	5																																	
Compostela	1	1	4	2	4	4	5	12	16																																	
Córdoba	17	21	22	21	16	17	15	11	11																																	
Eibar	19	18	17	19	17	14	11	13	14																																	
Elche	15	17	16	14	15	16	14	17	18																																	
Extremadura	8	3	1	1	1	1	1	1	1																																	
Getafe	16	20	19	18	20	22	21	22	20																																	
Las Palmas	4	2	5	3	2	3	2	3	2																																	
Leganés	14	15	20	20	21	20	22	20	22																																	
Levante	10	4	12	8	9	5	6	4	4																																	
Lleida	11	19	21	22	22	18	18	18	17																																	
Logroñés	9	16	18	17	14	15	17	16	15																																	
Mérida	13	6	3	7	10	10	10	14	8																																	
Osasuna	2	9	6	4	7	6	9	7	10																																	
Recreativo	22	13	9	10	5	9	8	10	13																																	
Salamanca	6	7	2	6	3	2	3	2	3																																	
Sporting Gijón	7	11	7	5	8	11	12	9	9																																	
Tenerife	20	12	8	9	12	13	16	15	12																																	
Toledo	21	22	15	16	18	21	20	21	21																																	
Villarreal	12	14	10	11	6	12	13	8	7																																	

Promotion to La Liga
Relegation to Segunda División B

Source: BDFútbol
