= 1999–2000 Copa del Rey =

98th Copa del Rey

Tournament details
- Country: Spain
- Teams: 55

Final positions
- Champions: Espanyol
- Runners-up: Atlético de Madrid

Tournament statistics
- Matches played: 106
- Goals scored: 234 (2.21 per match)
- Top goal scorer(s): (Spain) Arenaza (Brazil) Barata (Spain) Luis Cembranos (Romania) Gâlcă (Netherlands) Hasselbaink (Spain) Míchel (Spain) Yordi (4 goals)

The 1999–2000 Copa del Rey was the 98th staging of the Copa del Rey.

The competition started on 1 September 1999 and concluded on 27 May 2000 with the Final, held at the Estadio Mestalla in Valencia.

== Preliminary round ==
| Home team | Score | Away team |
|---|---|---|
| Ponferradina | 4–3 | Cultural Leonesa |
| Real Ávila | 2–2 (p) | Talavera |
| Gimnástica Segoviana | 1–0 | Universidad de Las Palmas |
| Premià | 2–0 | Levante |
| Novelda | 2–1 | Elche |
| Izarra | 0–2 | Barakaldo |
| Zamora | 2–1 | Racing Ferrol |
| Real Unión | 1–0 | Burgos |
| Lanzarote | 1–1 (p) | Getafe |
| Figueruelas | 1–2 | Bermeo |
| Guadix | 0–0 (p) | Polideportivo Almería |
| Alzira | (p) 1–1 | Real Murcia |
| Dos Hermanas | 1–3 | Córdoba |
| Coria | 1–0 | Cádiz |
| Linense | 1–2 | Melilla |
| Lorca | 1–0 | Cartagena |

== First round ==
| Team 1 | Agg. | Team 2 | 1st leg | 2nd leg |
|---|---|---|---|---|
| Alzira | 0–2 | Málaga | 0–0 | 0–2 |
| Badajoz | 1–2 | Las Palmas | 1–1 | 0–1 |
| Barakaldo | 3–2 | Premià | 1–0 | 2–2 |
| Bermeo | 0–2 | Real Betis | 0–0 | 0–2 |
| Compostela | 6–5 | Numancia | 4–2 | 2–3 |
| Córdoba | 1–3 | Espanyol | 1–1 | 0–2 |
| Coria | 3–5 | Lleida | 2–4 | 1–1 |
| Eibar | 1–0 | Toledo | 1–0 | 0–0 |
| Extremadura | 1–2 | Alavés | 1–1 | 0–1 |
| Gimnástica Segoviana | 1–2 | Sporting Gijón | 0–0 | 1–2 |
| Hércules | 0–3 | Racing Santander | 0–0 | 0–3 |
| Logroñés | 3–1 | Real Sociedad | 2–1 | 1–0 |
| Lorca | 0–3 | Real Oviedo | 0–1 | 0–2 |
| Melilla | 4–5 | Athletic Bilbao | 2–2 | 2–3 |
| Novelda | 0–1 | Polideportivo Almería | 0–1 | 0–0 |
| Osasuna | 2–1 | Sevilla | 1–0 | 1–1 |
| Ourense | 3–1 | Getafe | 1–0 | 2–1 |
| Ponferradina | 2–4 (a.e.t.) | Albacete | 1–1 | 1–3 |
| Recreativo | 0–4 | Real Zaragoza | 0–0 | 0–4 |
| Real Unión | 2–1 | Real Valladolid | 1–1 | 1–0 |
| Salamanca | 4–6 | Rayo Vallecano | 2–2 | 2–4 |
| Talavera | 1–3 | Mérida | 1–0 | 0–3 |
| Villarreal | 3–1 (a.e.t.) | Leganés | 0–1 | 3–0 |
| Zamora | 2–6 | CD Tenerife | 2–2 | 0–4 |

== Second round ==
| Team 1 | Agg. | Team 2 | 1st leg | 2nd leg |
|---|---|---|---|---|
| Sporting Gijón | 2–7 | Celta | 0–3 | 2–4 |
| Polideportivo Almería | 0–2 | Barcelona | 0–0 | 0–2 |
| Deportivo La Coruña | 2–2 | Málaga | 1–0 | 1–2 |
| Las Palmas | 2–3 | Atlético Madrid | 2–2 | 0–1 |
| Ourense | 4–3 | Mallorca | 2–2 | 2–1 |
| Osasuna | 3–2 | Valencia | 3–0 | 0–2 |
| Real Zaragoza | 6–2 | Racing Santander | 2–1 | 4–1 |
| Athletic Bilbao | 0–1 | Rayo Vallecano | 0–1 | 0–0 |
| Logroñés | 4–4 | Real Oviedo | 3–2 | 1–2 |
| Albacete | 0–2 | Espanyol | 0–0 | 0–2 |
| CP Merida | 2–0 | Real Betis | 1–0 | 1–0 |
| Real Unión | 2–2 | Alavés | 1–0 | 1–2 |
| Lleida | 1–1 | Eibar | 0–0 | 1–1 |
| Barakaldo | 0–1 | Villarreal | 0–0 | 0–1 |
| CD Tenerife | 2–4 | Compostela | 2–2 | 0–2 |
Bye: Real Madrid CF

== Bracket ==
Round of 16
1 | (Basque Country (autonomous community)) Real Unión | 0 | 0 | 0
16 | (Community of Madrid) Atlético Madrid | 3 | 2 | 5
8 | (Catalonia) Lleida | 2 | 1 | 3
9 | (Community of Madrid) Rayo Vallecano | 3 | 3 | 6
5 | (Navarre) Osasuna | 1 | 1 | 2
12 | (Galicia (Spain)) Deportivo de A Coruña | 0 | 0 | 0
4 | (Galicia (Spain)) Ourense | 1 | 0 | 1
13 | (Catalonia) Barcelona | 2 | 0 | 2
6 | (Aragon) Real Zaragoza | 0 | 0 | 0
11 | (Community of Madrid) Real Madrid | 0 | 2 | 2
3 | (Extremadura) Mérida | 1 | 0 | 1
14 | (Asturias) Real Oviedo | 0 | 0 | 0
7 | (Catalonia) Espanyol | 2 | 1 | 3
10 | (Galicia (Spain)) Celta Vigo | 1 | 0 | 1
2 | (Galicia (Spain)) Compostela (p) | 3 | 0 | 3 (4)
15 | (Valencian Community) Villarreal | 0 | 3 | 3 (2)

Quarter-finals
(Community of Madrid) Atlético Madrid (a) | 0 | 2 | 2
(Community of Madrid) Rayo Vallecano | 0 | 2 | 2
(Navarre) Osasuna | 0 | 0 | 0
(Catalonia) Barcelona | 4 | 2 | 6
(Community of Madrid) Real Madrid (a) | 1 | 1 | 2
(Extremadura) Mérida | 0 | 2 | 2
(Catalonia) Espanyol | 5 | 0 | 5
(Galicia (Spain)) Compostela | 1 | 1 | 2

Semi-finals
(Community of Madrid) Atlético Madrid | 3 | 3 | 6
(Catalonia) Barcelona | 0 | 0 | 0
(Community of Madrid) Real Madrid | 0 | 1 | 1
(Catalonia) Espanyol | 0 | 2 | 2

Final
(Community of Madrid) Atlético Madrid | 1
(Catalonia) Espanyol | 2

== Round of 16 ==
| Team 1 | Agg. | Team 2 | 1st leg | 2nd leg |
|---|---|---|---|---|
| Zaragoza | 0–2 | Real Madrid | 0–0 | 0–2 |
| Mérida | 1–0 | Oviedo | 1–0 | 0–0 |
| Espanyol | 3–1 | Celta | 2–1 | 1–0 |
| Compostela | (p) 3–3 | Villarreal | 3–0 | 0–3 |
| Osasuna | 2–0 | Deportivo de La Coruña | 1–0 | 1–0 |
| Orense | 1–2 | Barcelona | 1–2 | 0–0 |
| Real Unión | 0–5 | Atlético de Madrid | 0–3 | 0–2 |
| Lleida | 3–6 | Rayo Vallecano | 2–3 | 1–3 |

== Quarter-finals ==
| Team 1 | Agg. | Team 2 | 1st leg | 2nd leg |
|---|---|---|---|---|
| Osasuna | 0–6 | Barcelona | 0–4 | 0–2 |
| Espanyol | 5–2 | Compostela | 5–1 | 0–1 |
| Atlético de Madrid | (a) 2–2 | Rayo Vallecano | 0–0 | 2–2 |
| Real Madrid | (a) 2–2 | Mérida | 1–0 | 1–2 |

== Semi-finals ==
| Team 1 | Agg. | Team 2 | 1st leg | 2nd leg |
|---|---|---|---|---|
| Real Madrid | 0–1 | RCD Espanyol | 0–0 | 0–1 |
| Atlético de Madrid | 6–0 | FC Barcelona | 3–0 | 3–0† |

Note: Barcelona failed to play the second leg due to a fixture clash with UEFA international matches, which left Barcelona with only eleven eligible players, including the three permitted players promoted from the reserve team. The players refused to take to the field as a protest against the Spanish FA (RFEF), and were disqualified from the competition.

== Final ==
27 May 2000
21:00 CEST

| Atlético Madrid | 1–2 | Espanyol |
|---|---|---|
| Hasselbaink 90' | Report | Tamudo 2'; Sergio 84' |

Mestalla, Valencia
Attendance: 55,000
Referee: Antonio López Nieto

== Top goalscorers ==
| Goalscorers | Goals | Team |
|---|---|---|
| (Spain) Luis Cembranos | 4 | Rayo Vallecano |
| (Spain) Yordi | 4 | Zaragoza |
| (Romania) Constantin Gâlcă | 4 | Espanyol |
| (Spain) Míchel | 4 | Rayo Vallecano |
| (Brazil) Barata | 4 | Tenerife |
| (Spain) Igor Arenaza | 4 | Logroñés |
| (Netherlands) Jimmy Floyd Hasselbaink | 4 | Atlético Madrid |
| (Brazil) Mauricio | 3 | Compostela |
| (Spain) Manel | 3 | Logroñés |
| (Spain) Luis Enrique | 3 | Barcelona |
