= CP Mérida =

Association football club

Mérida
- Full name: Club Polideportivo Mérida
- Nicknames: Romanos; Pecholatas
- Founded: 28 December 1912 (as Sportiva Emeritense)
- Dissolved: 11 September 2000
- Stadium: Estadio Romano
- Capacity: 14,600
- 1999–2000: Segunda División, 6th
Home colours	Away colours

Club Polideportivo Mérida was a Spanish football team based in Mérida, in the autonomous community of Extremadura.

Having played twice in La Liga (1995–96 and 1997–98), the club was dissolved in 2000, due to serious economic debts. Its successor was renamed Mérida UD.

== History ==
The team founded in 1912 under the name Sportiva Emeritense. It became one of the first teams from Extremadura to play professional football. The club first began playing football in 1943, when it was admitted to Tercera Division. They spent four years there, after which the team was relegated to regional leagues for two years. Merida returned to Tercera division in 1949. Following 12 years in the third tier, Merida was again demoted to the fourth tier in 1961, but only for one year. Until 1980, the team kept bouncing between the third and fourth tiers.

In 1980, Merida first promoted to the newly created Spanish third tier – the Segunda Division B. They returned to Segunda B in 1989, where they stayed for two seasons. The period from 1990 is generally considered the "golden age" in Merida's history.

The team was promoted to Segunda Division for the first time ever in 1991, when they finished fourth in Segunda B. Three strong seasons were followed by another, even better, when the team managed to win Segunda Division and promote to La Liga for the first time in 1995. The 1995-96 La Liga season was difficult and ended in relegation for Merida. They, however returned to the elite one season later, for the 1997-98 La Liga season. However, the team could not avoid relegation again, and were demoted to Segunda once more.

Following two decent seasons in Segunda, the owners of Merida declared bankruptcy and the team folded in 2000. A successor club, named Merida UD. This was mainly done by fans of the original club, who wanted to preserve the legacy and traditions of the old club, since the city was left without a professional club.

As of 2023, CP Merida and CF Extremadura are the only two teams from Extremadura to have played football in La Liga.

== Club background ==
- Sportiva Emeritense — (1912–1920)
- Club Catalanes — Club MZA — (1920–1921)
- Club Emerita — (1921–1936)
- Spanish Civil War – No team — (1936–1939)
- SD Emeritense — (1939–1966)
- Mérida Industrial CF — (1966–1985)
- CP Mérida — (1985–2000)
- Mérida UD — (1990–2013)
- Mérida AD — (2013–present)

== Honours ==
- Extremadura Championship
  - Runners-up (1): 1930–31

== Seasons ==
Season	Tier	Division	Place	Copa del Rey
1942–43	3	1ª Reg.	4th	
1943–44	3	3ª	4th	
1944–45	3	3ª	8th	
1945–46	3	3ª	10th	
1946–47	3	3ª	7th	
1947–48	4	1ª Reg.		
1948–49	4	1ª Reg.		
1949–50	3	3ª	16th	
1950–51	3	3ª	9th	
1951–52	3	3ª	4th	
1952–53	3	3ª	9th	
1953–54	3	3ª	4th	
1954–55	3	3ª	2nd	
1955–56	3	3ª	3rd	
1956–57	3	3ª	1st	
1957–58	3	3ª	4th	
1958–59	3	3ª	11th	
1959–60	3	3ª	4th	
1960–61	3	3ª	15th	
1961–62	4	1ª Reg.	1st	

Season	Tier	Division	Place	Copa del Rey
1962–63	3	3ª	9th	
1963–64	3	3ª	11th	
1964–65	3	3ª	9th	
1965–66	3	3ª	9th	
1966–67	3	3ª	6th	
1967–68	3	3ª	4th	
1968–69	3	3ª	10th	
1969–70	3	3ª	7th	
1970–71	3	3ª	17th	
1971–72	4	1ª Reg.	2nd	
1972–73	4	1ª Reg.	3rd	
1973–74	4	1ª Reg.	6th	
1974–75	4	Reg. Pref.	3rd	
1975–76	4	Reg. Pref.	1st	
1976–77	3	3ª	15th	
1977–78	4	3ª	8th	
1978–79	4	3ª	4th	
1979–80	4	3ª	1st	
1980–81	3	2ª B	18th	
1981–82	4	3ª	2nd	

Season	Tier	Division	Place	Copa del Rey
1982–83	4	3ª	6th	
1983–84	4	3ª	6th	
1984–85	4	3ª	4th	
1985–86	4	3ª	7th	
1986–87	4	3ª	12th	
1987–88	4	3ª	2nd	
1988–89	4	3ª	1st	
1989–90	3	2ª B	8th	
1990–91	3	2ª B	4th	

Season	Tier	Division	Place	Copa del Rey
1991–92	2	2ª	7th	
1992–93	2	2ª	9th	
1993–94	2	2ª	9th	
1994–95	2	2ª	1st	
1995–96	1	1ª	21st	Third round
1996–97	2	2ª	1st	
1997–98	1	1ª	19th	Quarter-finals
1998–99	2	2ª	10th	
1999–2000	2	2ª	6th	Quarter-finals

- 2 seasons in La Liga
- 7 seasons in Segunda División
- 3 seasons in Segunda División B
- 37 seasons in Tercera División
