= CF Extremadura =

Spanish football team

Extremadura
- Full name: Club de Fútbol Extremadura
- Founded: 1924
- Dissolved: 2010
- Ground: Francisco de la Hera; Almendralejo, Extremadura, Spain
- Capacity: 11,580
- 2009–10: Regional Preferente, 19th
Home colours	Away colours

Club de Fútbol Extremadura was a Spanish football team based in Almendralejo, in the autonomous community of Extremadura. Founded in 1924, it played two seasons in La Liga, and held home games at Estadio Francisco de la Hera, with a capacity of 11,580 seats. The club folded in 2010 following several years of financial problems.

== History ==
Extremadura was founded in 1924, and spent the first 30 years of its existence in the regional leagues, promoting to the second division after winning the regional championship in the third.

The club lasted seven seasons in the category, finishing in fifth position in the 1958–59 season. Subsequently, the following 29 years were spent in the third level – in 1977 it became the fourth, after the creation of Segunda División B – with the addition of three relegations to the regional championships.

In 1990, after finishing first, Extremadura promoted to division three. Four years later, after winning its group, it returned to the second after an absence of 34 years; during that period of time, football in the region of Extremadura experienced a rise, with CD Badajoz and CP Mérida also competing in that level in the mid-1990s.

Extremadura finished in fifth position in the 1995–96 campaign. However, Real Madrid Castilla was ineligible for the playoffs, and Extremadura took its place, achieving promotion to La Liga for the first time ever after disposing of Albacete Balompié 2–0 on aggregate – Iosu Ortoundo was the manager.

The first season in the top flight was difficult as expected: the team lost its first nine matches and only won one of the first 19, but eventually recovered, finishing only one point from the safety zone. In the following year, with a young Rafael Benítez in charge, immediate promotion back was easily attained, as runner-up.

In the 1998–99 season Extremadura finished in 17th position, and the second top flight campaign also ended in relegation, after losing in the playoffs against Rayo Vallecano. The club's financial situation was precarious, and it dropped another division in 2002; in the first season in level three, a fifth position meant a narrow miss in the subsequent promotion playoffs, and the following four years were also spent in the division, with the club never finishing higher than tenth.

After the regular season in 2006–07, Extremadura faced UD Pájara Playas de Jandía from the island of Fuerteventura in the relegation playoffs: after a 0–3 away loss, a 1–1 home draw returned the club to the fourth division, after 17 years. Shortly afterwards it emerged that the club could not settle its economic problems, with players being due several months in wages. After confirmation by the Royal Spanish Football Federation on 1 August 2008, the club was relegated a further category.

Extremadura's sporting and financial troubles continued in the following years, with the club never ranking higher than 16th. In August 2010 it folded, being dissolved by its major shareholder, the Almendralejo City Hall; that fate had already befallen Mérida, with Badajoz being saved in the last minute, replaced by another team in the city and being dropped to level four.

== Season to season ==
Season	Tier	Division	Place	Copa del Rey
1950–51	4	1ª Reg.	3rd	
1951–52	4	1ª Reg.	1st	
1952–53	3	3ª	3rd	
1953–54	3	3ª	1st	
1954–55	2	2ª	11th	
1955–56	2	2ª	7th	
1956–57	2	2ª	9th	
1957–58	2	2ª	9th	
1958–59	2	2ª	5th	Round of 32
1959–60	2	2ª	12th	First round
1960–61	2	2ª	15th	First round
1961–62	3	3ª	4th	
1962–63	3	3ª	6th	
1963–64	3	3ª	2nd	
1964–65	3	3ª	8th	
1965–66	3	3ª	1st	
1966–67	3	3ª	3rd	
1967–68	3	3ª	6th	
1968–69	3	3ª	15th	
1969–70	3	3ª	15th	

Season	Tier	Division	Place	Copa del Rey
1970–71	4	1ª Reg.	2nd	
1971–72	4	1ª Reg.	1st	
1972–73	3	3ª	18th	
1973–74	4	1ª Reg.	1st	
1974–75	3	3ª	19th	
1975–76	4	Reg. Pref.	2nd	
1976–77	4	Reg. Pref.	1st	
1977–78	4	3ª	6th	
1978–79	4	3ª	16th	
1979–80	4	3ª	13th	
1980–81	4	3ª	11th	
1981–82	4	3ª	13th	
1982–83	4	3ª	13th	
1983–84	4	3ª	4th	
1984–85	4	3ª	2nd	
1985–86	4	3ª	5th	
1986–87	4	3ª	4th	
1987–88	4	3ª	3rd	
1988–89	4	3ª	2nd	
1989–90	4	3ª	1st	

Season	Tier	Division	Place	Copa del Rey
1990–91	3	2ª B	14th	
1991–92	3	2ª B	3rd	
1992–93	3	2ª B	6th	Third round
1993–94	3	2ª B	1st	
1994–95	2	2ª	15th	
1995–96	2	2ª	5th	
1996–97	1	1ª	19th	Round of 16
1997–98	2	2ª	2nd	Round of 16
1998–99	1	1ª	17th	Third round
1999–2000	2	2ª	8th	First round

Season	Tier	Division	Place	Copa del Rey
2000–01	2	2ª	11th	Round of 16
2001–02	2	2ª	21st	Round of 64
2002–03	3	2ª B	5th	Round of 64
2003–04	3	2ª B	13th	First round
2004–05	3	2ª B	10th	
2005–06	3	2ª B	11th	
2006–07	3	2ª B	16th	
2007–08	5	Reg. Pref.	17th	
2008–09	5	Reg. Pref.	17th	
2009–10	5	Reg. Pref.	19th	

- 2 seasons in La Liga
- 13 seasons in Segunda División
- 9 seasons in Segunda División B
- 26 seasons in Tercera División (13 on 3rd tier)

== Honours ==
- Extremadura Championship
  - Runners-up (2): 1927–28, 1939–40

== Stadium ==
CF Extremadura's first permanent ground was called Campo de Santa Aurora, which was located on Camino Alange. It was used from 1928 to 1935, when the club moved to nearby Campo Santa Elvira.

In 1950, the idea of building a municipal stadium was formed, and the club moved to a plot of land adjacent to the proposed stadium. For just over one season, it played at the site, called Los Cañizos. On 12 October 1951, Extremadura played Sevilla FC in the inaugural match at the new grounds, Estadio Francisco de la Hera. The stadium remained relatively unchanged until 1996, when it was demolished to make way for a revamped one, with and a seated capacity of 11,580.

== Famous players ==
Note: this list includes players that have played at least 100 league games and/or have reached international status.

- (Argentina) José Basualdo
- (Argentina) Fernando D'Amico
- (Argentina) Carlos Duré
- (Belgium) Ronny Gaspercic
- (Brazil) Renaldo
- (Cameroon) Raymond Kalla
- (Colombia) Carlos Navarro Montoya
- (Ivory Coast) Ahmed Ouattara
- (Equatorial Guinea) (Spain) Iván Zarandona
- (Paraguay) Virgilio Ferreira
- (Spain) Quique Estebaranz
- (Spain) Ito
- (Spain) Juanito
- (Spain) Kiko
- (Spain) Óscar Montiel
- (Spain) Pedro José
- (Spain) (Italy) Pier
- (Spain) Poli
- (Switzerland) Antonio Esposito
- (Uruguay) Víctor López

== Famous coaches ==
- (Spain) Rafael Benítez
- (Spain) Josu Ortuondo

== See also ==
- CF Extremadura B, reserve team
