= 1994–95 RC Celta de Vigo season =

Celta Vigo
1994–95 season
- President: José Luis Núñez Gallego
- Head coach: Carlos Aimar
- Stadium: Balaídos
- La Liga: 13th
- Copa del Rey: Fourth round
- Top goalscorer: League: Vladimir Gudelj (17); All: Vladimir Gudelj (20)
Home colours	Away colours	Third colours

Celta Vigo contested La Liga and the Copa del Rey in the 1994–95 season. They placed 13th in La Liga, an improvement of two places on the previous season. They couldn't match their runner-up performance from the previous year's Copa del Rey, as they were eliminated in the fourth round by Real Mallorca.

== Squad ==
Note: Flags indicate national team as defined under FIFA eligibility rules; some limited exceptions apply. Players may hold more than one non-FIFA nationality.

No.	Pos.	Nation	Player
—	GK	ESP	Carlos Cano
—	GK	ESP	Patxi Villanueva
—	DF	ESP	Borja Agirretxu
—	DF	ESP	Alejo
—	DF	ESP	Mikel Antía
—	DF	ESP	Rafael Berges
—	DF	ESP	Mariano
—	DF	ESP	Míchel Salgado
—	DF	ESP	Patxi Salinas
—	DF	ESP	José Manuel Tárraga
—	MF	YUG	Srđan Bajčetić
—	MF	ARG	Hermes Desio

No.	Pos.	Nation	Player
—	MF	ESP	José Gil
—	MF	ESP	Ángel Merino
—	MF	ESP	Carlos Pérez
—	MF	BIH	Milorad Ratković
—	MF	ESP	Alberto Toril
—	MF	ESP	Vicente (captain)
—	MF	ESP	Tito Vilanova
—	FW	BIH	Vladimir Gudelj
—	FW	ESP	Sebastián Losada
—	FW	ESP	Juan Sánchez
—	FW	ESP	Silvio
—	FW	ESP	José Ángel Uribarrena

=== Left club during season ===
Note: Flags indicate national team as defined under FIFA eligibility rules; some limited exceptions apply. Players may hold more than one non-FIFA nationality.

No.	Pos.	Nation	Player
—	DF	HUN	Zsolt Limperger (to Real Mallorca)

== Squad stats ==
Last updated on 27 February 2021.

No.	Pos	Nat	Player	Total		La Liga		Copa del Rey	
No.	Pos	Nat	Player	Apps	Goals	Apps	Goals	Apps	Goals
	GK	(Spain) ESP	Carlos Cano	12	0	11	0	1	0
	GK	(Spain) ESP	Patxi Villanueva	30	0	27	0	3	0
	DF	(Spain) ESP	Borja Agirretxu	22	1	13+8	1	1	0
	DF	(Spain) ESP	Alejo	38	1	35	1	3	0
	DF	(Spain) ESP	Mikel Antía	0	0	0	0	0	0
	DF	(Spain) ESP	Rafael Berges	39	0	35	0	4	0
	DF	(Spain) ESP	Mariano	40	1	36	1	4	0
	DF	(Spain) ESP	Míchel Salgado	15	0	6+8	0	1	0
	DF	(Spain) ESP	Patxi Salinas	39	1	36	1	3	0
	DF	(Spain) ESP	José Manuel Tárraga	11	0	6+3	0	2	0
	MF	(Federal Republic of Yugoslavia) YUG	Srđan Bajčetić	2	0	0+2	0	0	0
	MF	(Argentina) ARG	Hermes Desio	38	0	35	0	3	0
	MF	(Spain) ESP	José Gil	40	2	29+8	2	2+1	0
	MF	(Spain) ESP	Ángel Merino	37	2	30+3	2	4	0
	MF	(Spain) ESP	Carlos Pérez	22	1	11+8	0	2+1	1
	MF	(Bosnia and Herzegovina) BIH	Milorad Ratković	18	2	12+4	2	2	0
	MF	(Spain) ESP	Alberto Toril	9	0	5+4	0	0	0
	MF	(Spain) ESP	Vicente	12	0	8+2	0	0+2	0
	MF	(Spain) ESP	Tito Vilanova	6	1	0+6	1	0	0
	FW	(Bosnia and Herzegovina) BIH	Vladimir Gudelj	37	20	33+1	17	3	3
	FW	(Spain) ESP	Sebastián Losada	22	7	14+6	4	2	3
	FW	(Spain) ESP	Juan Sánchez	26	2	16+7	2	2+1	0
	FW	(Spain) ESP	Silvio	1	0	0	0	0+1	0
	FW	(Spain) ESP	José Ángel Uribarrena	28	1	20+5	1	2+1	0
Players who have left the club after the start of the season:
	DF	(Hungary) HUN	Zsolt Limperger	1	0	0	0	0+1	0

== Results ==
=== La Liga ===
==== League table ====
Pos	Team	Pld	W	D	L	GF	GA	GD	Pts
11	Real Sociedad	38	12	14	12	56	44	+12	38 (Note: RSO 0–2 VAL; VAL 4–2 RSO)
12	Racing Santander	38	13	10	15	42	47	−5	36 (Note: CEL 2–1 RAC; RAC 2–0 CEL)
13	Celta Vigo (Note: On July 31, 1995, Sevilla and Celta Vigo were relegated to Segunda División B for not providing documentation (an audit) nor making their payments to the Royal Spanish Football Federation within the time limit. The two best qualified teams to be relegated, Albacete and Valladolid were readmitted to La Liga. Later, Sevilla and Celta Vigo claimed that according to the law they had another 15 working days because they made allegations days before. Finally, the solution was to not relegate any involved team and expand the league to 22 teams for the next two seasons.)	38	11	14	13	36	48	−12	36
14	Atlético Madrid	38	13	9	16	56	54	+2	35 (Note: TEN 1–0 ATM; ATM 3–1 TEN)
15	Tenerife	38	13	9	16	57	57	0	35

Source: LFP
Rules for classification: 1) points; 2) head-to-head points; 3) head-to-head goal difference; 4) head-to-head goals scored; 5) goal difference; 6) number of goals scored.

==== Matches ====
4 September 1994 1	Albacete Balompié	1 – 1	Celta Vigo	Albacete, Spain
	Zalazar 65' (pen.)	Report	42' Uribarrena	Stadium: Estadio Carlos Belmonte; Referee: José Pajares Paz

10 September 1994 2	Celta Vigo	1 – 1	Athletic Bilbao	Vigo, Spain
	Ratković 34'	Report	36' Guerrero	Stadium: Balaídos; Referee: Antonio López Nieto

18 September 1994 3	Sporting de Gijón	0 – 0	Celta Vigo	Gijón, Spain
		Report		Stadium: El Molinón; Referee: Luis Contador Crespo

25 September 1994 4	Celta Vigo	2 – 1	Racing Santander	Vigo, Spain
	Ratković 82'; Gudelj 85'	Report	88' Popov	Stadium: Balaídos; Referee: César Barrenechea Montero

2 October 1994 5	Español	0 – 0	Celta Vigo	Barcelona, Spain
		Report		Stadium: Estadi de Sarrià; Referee: Miguel Marín López

9 October 1994 6	Celta Vigo	1 – 2	Compostela	Vigo, Spain
	Gudelj 44'	Report	67' Lucas; 70' Ohen	Stadium: Balaídos; Referee: Juan Brito Arceo

16 October 1994 7	Real Zaragoza	4 – 0	Celta Vigo	Zaragoza, Spain
	Poyet 7'; Franco 12'; Higuera 44'; Pardeza 59'	Report		Stadium: La Romareda; Referee: Gonzalo Panadero Martínez

22 October 1994 8	Celta Vigo	1 – 0	Atlético Madrid	Vigo, Spain
	Losada 14'	Report		Stadium: Balaídos; Referee: Francisco Santamaría Uzqueda

29 October 1994 9	Valencia	1 – 0	Celta Vigo	Valencia, Spain
	Mijatović 60'	Report		Stadium: Mestalla Stadium; Referee: Carmelo Rodríguez Martel

6 November 1994 10	Celta Vigo	3 – 2	Tenerife	Vigo, Spain
	Gil 31'; Alejo 79'; Salinas 84'	Report	30' Víctor; 64' Juanele	Stadium: Balaídos; Referee: José Manuel Andradas Asurmendi

20 November 1994 11	Real Sociedad	2 – 3	Celta Vigo	San Sebastián, Spain
	Lumbreras 5'; Kodro 47'	Report	30', 79' (pen.), 86' Gudelj	Stadium: Anoeta; Referee: Juan Andújar Oliver

27 November 1994 12	Celta Vigo	0 – 0	Real Oviedo	Vigo, Spain
		Report		Stadium: Balaídos; Referee: José Pajares Paz

4 December 1994 13	Real Valladolid	1 – 1	Celta Vigo	Valladolid, Spain
	Nílson 84' (pen.)	Report	48' Losada	Stadium: José Zorrilla; Referee: José Núñez Manrique

11 December 1994 14	Celta Vigo	2 – 4	Barcelona	Vigo, Spain
	Losada 86'; Gudelj 89'	Report	12' Stoichkov; 54' Romário; 80' (pen.) Koeman; 87' Hagi	Stadium: Balaídos; Referee: Arturo Daudén Ibáñez

21 December 1994 15	Deportivo La Coruña	1 – 2	Celta Vigo	A Coruña, Spain
	Bebeto 77'	Report	2' Gudelj; 52' Losada	Stadium: Estadio Riazor; Referee: Manuel Díaz Vega

8 January 1995 16	Celta Vigo	0 – 0	Sevilla	Vigo, Spain
		Report		Stadium: Balaídos; Referee: Alonso Gómez López

15 January 1995 17	Celta Vigo	0 – 2	Real Betis	Vigo, Spain
		Report	36', 55' Cuéllar	Stadium: Balaídos; Referee: César Barrenechea Montero

22 January 1995 18	Real Madrid	4 – 0	Celta Vigo	Madrid, Spain
	Raúl 21', 51'; Hierro 26', 70'	Report		Stadium: Santiago Bernabéu Stadium; Referee: Gonzalo Panadero Martínez

29 January 1995 19	Celta Vigo	0 – 1	Logroñés	Vigo, Spain
		Report	41' Juanjo Rodríguez	Stadium: Balaídos; Referee: Carmelo Rodríguez Martel

5 February 1995 20	Celta Vigo	0 – 0	Albacete Balompié	Vigo, Spain
		Report		Stadium: Balaídos; Referee: Francisco Santamaría Uzqueda

12 February 1995 21	Athletic Bilbao	1 – 1	Celta Vigo	Bilbao, Spain
	Suances 44'	Report	46' (pen.) Gudelj	Stadium: San Mamés; Referee: José María García-Aranda

19 February 1995 22	Celta Vigo	2 – 0	Sporting de Gijón	Vigo, Spain
	Gudelj 64', 66'	Report		Stadium: Balaídos; Referee: Antonio Martin Navarrete

26 February 1995 23	Racing Santander	2 – 0	Celta Vigo	Santander, Spain
	Torre 33'; Radchenko 38'	Report		Stadium: El Sardinero; Referee: Luis Contador Crespo

5 March 1995 24	Celta Vigo	1 – 2	Espanyol	Vigo, Spain
	Sánchez 27'	Report	57' Răducioiu; 77' Lluís González	Stadium: Balaídos; Referee: Juan Ansuátegui Roca

12 March 1995 25	Compostela	2 – 0	Celta Vigo	Santiago de Compostela, Spain
	Ohen 6', 89'	Report		Stadium: Estadio Multiusos de San Lázaro; Referee: Juan Andújar Oliver

19 March 1995 26	Celta Vigo	0 – 0	Real Zaragoza	Vigo, Spain
		Report		Stadium: Balaídos; Referee: César Barrenechea Montero

2 April 1995 27	Atlético Madrid	0 – 2	Celta Vigo	Madrid, Spain
		Report	30' Mariano; 89' Gudelj	Stadium: Estadio Vicente Calderón; Referee: Alonso Gómez López

9 April 1995 28	Celta Vigo	0 – 0	Valencia	Vigo, Spain
		Report		Stadium: Balaídos; Referee: José Pajares Paz

16 April 1995 29	Tenerife	3 – 0	Celta Vigo	Santa Cruz de Tenerife, Spain
	Ramis 44'; Pizzi 66'; Conte 75'	Report		Stadium: Heliodoro Rodríguez López; Referee: José Núñez Manrique

23 April 1995 30	Celta Vigo	2 – 1	Real Sociedad	Vigo, Spain
	Merino 36'; Sánchez 50'	Report	43' Pikabea	Stadium: Balaídos; Referee: Manuel Díaz Vega

30 April 1995 31	Real Oviedo	2 – 2	Celta Vigo	Oviedo, Spain
	Rivas 56'; Maqueda 80'	Report	36' Gil; 87' Vilanova	Stadium: Estadio Carlos Tartiere; Referee: José Manuel Andradas Asurmendi

7 May 1995 32	Celta Vigo	1 – 0	Real Valladolid	Vigo, Spain
	Agirretxu 40'	Report		Stadium: Balaídos; Referee: José María García-Aranda

14 May 1995 33	Barcelona	1 – 1	Celta Vigo	Barcelona, Spain
	Cruyff 65'	Report	77' Gudelj	Stadium: Camp Nou; Referee: Carmelo Rodríguez Martel

21 May 1995 34	Celta Vigo	0 – 2	Deportivo La Coruña	Vigo, Spain
		Report	15' Manjarín; 67' Alfredo Santaelena	Stadium: Balaídos; Referee: Victor José Esquinas Torres

28 May 1995 35	Sevilla	2 – 3	Celta Vigo	Seville, Spain
	Šuker 9'; Marcos 87'	Report	34' Merino; 41', 88' Gudelj	Stadium: Ramón Sánchez Pizjuán; Referee: Manuel Díaz Vega

4 June 1995 36	Real Betis	1 – 1	Celta Vigo	Seville, Spain
	Márquez 27'	Report	2' (o.g.) Jaime	Stadium: Benito Villamarín; Referee: Juan Brito Arceo

10 June 1995 37	Celta Vigo	0 – 2	Real Madrid	Vigo, Spain
		Report	83' Raúl; 87' Rivera	Stadium: Balaídos; Referee: Celino Gracia Redondo

18 June 1995 38	Logroñés	0 – 3	Celta Vigo	Logroño, Spain
		Report	34', 76' (pen.), 89' Gudelj	Stadium: Estadio Las Gaunas; Referee: José María García-Aranda

=== Copa del Rey ===
==== Third round ====
4 January 1995 First leg	Lugo	2 – 1	Celta Vigo	Lugo, Spain
	Borge 71'; Coméndez 74'	Report	46' Losada	Stadium: Anxo Carro; Referee: José Rubio Valdivieso

11 January 1995 Second leg	Celta Vigo	5 – 0	Lugo	Vigo, Spain
	Pérez 9'; Gudelj 28', 49'; Losada 68', 87'	Report		Stadium: Balaídos; Referee: José María García-Aranda

Celta Vigo won 6–2 on aggregate

==== Fourth round ====
25 January 1995 First leg	Real Mallorca	2 – 1	Celta Vigo	Palma de Mallorca, Spain
	Ronda 33'; Luis 82'	Report	59' Gudelj	Stadium: Lluís Sitjar; Referee: José Núñez Manrique

1 February 1995 Second leg	Celta Vigo	0 – 0	Real Mallorca	Vigo, Spain
		Report		Stadium: Balaídos; Referee: Juan Andújar Oliver

Real Mallorca won 2–1 on aggregate
