= 1992–93 RC Celta de Vigo season =

Celta Vigo
1992–93 season
- President: José Luis Núñez Gallego
- Head coach: Txetxu Rojo
- Stadium: Balaídos
- La Liga: 11th
- Copa del Rey: Third round
- Top goalscorer: League: Vladimir Gudelj (7); All: Vladimir Gudelj (7)
Home colours

Celta Vigo contested La Liga and the Copa del Rey in the 1992–93 season. This was their first season back in La Liga after two years away, having been promoted as 1991–92 Segunda División champions. They placed a credible 11th, their best top flight result since 1988–89. They matched their Copa del Rey result from the previous year, being eliminated by Segunda División B side Benidorm in the third round.

== Squad ==
Note: Flags indicate national team as defined under FIFA eligibility rules; some limited exceptions apply. Players may hold more than one non-FIFA nationality.

No.	Pos.	Nation	Player
—	GK	ESP	Santiago Cañizares
—	GK	ESP	Emilio López
—	GK	ESP	Javier Maté
—	GK	ESP	Patxi Villanueva
—	DF	ESP	Borja Agirretxu
—	DF	ESP	Alejo
—	DF	ESP	Atilano
—	DF	ESP	Luis Dadíe
—	DF	CRO	Goran Jurić
—	DF	ESP	Juan Carlos Mandiá
—	DF	ESP	Patxi Salinas
—	MF	ESP	Vicente Engonga
—	MF	ESP	José Gil

No.	Pos.	Nation	Player
—	MF	ESP	Manel
—	MF	ESP	José Luis Mosquera
—	MF	ESP	Jorge Otero
—	MF	ESP	Carlos Pérez
—	MF	SRB	Milorad Ratković
—	MF	ESP	Juan Carlos Sanromán
—	MF	ESP	Vicente (captain)
—	MF	ESP	Tito Vilanova
—	FW	YUG	Miloš Bursać
—	FW	SRB	Vladimir Gudelj
—	FW	ESP	Paco Salillas
—	FW	ESP	Salva
—	FW	ESP	Ismael Urzaiz (on loan from Real Madrid)

== Squad stats ==
Last updated on 2 March 2021.

No.	Pos	Nat	Player	Total		La Liga		Copa del Rey	
No.	Pos	Nat	Player	Apps	Goals	Apps	Goals	Apps	Goals
	GK	(Spain) ESP	Santiago Cañizares	37	0	36	0	1	0
	GK	(Spain) ESP	Emilio López	0	0	0	0	0	0
	GK	(Spain) ESP	Javier Maté	0	0	0	0	0	0
	GK	(Spain) ESP	Patxi Villanueva	3	0	2	0	1	0
	DF	(Spain) ESP	Borja Agirretxu	34	0	30+3	0	0+1	0
	DF	(Spain) ESP	Alejo	21	0	21	0	0	0
	DF	(Spain) ESP	Atilano	18	0	17	0	1	0
	DF	(Spain) ESP	Luis Dadíe	12	1	6+4	1	2	0
	DF	(Croatia) CRO	Goran Jurić	32	0	32	0	0	0
	DF	(Spain) ESP	Juan Carlos Mandiá	4	0	2	0	2	0
	DF	(Spain) ESP	Patxi Salinas	33	0	32	0	1	0
	MF	(Spain) ESP	Vicente Engonga	37	0	36	0	1	0
	MF	(Spain) ESP	José Gil	36	1	30+6	1	0	0
	MF	(Spain) ESP	Manel	0	0	0	0	0	0
	MF	(Spain) ESP	José Luis Mosquera	11	2	2+7	1	1+1	1
	MF	(Spain) ESP	Jorge Otero	38	1	36	1	2	0
	MF	(Spain) ESP	Carlos Pérez	6	0	1+3	0	2	0
	MF	(Serbia) SRB	Milorad Ratković	28	5	25+2	4	1	1
	MF	(Spain) ESP	Juan Carlos Sanromán	2	0	0+1	0	0+1	0
	MF	(Spain) ESP	Vicente	36	2	36	2	0	0
	MF	(Spain) ESP	Tito Vilanova	21	0	6+13	0	2	0
	FW	(Federal Republic of Yugoslavia) YUG	Miloš Bursać	16	2	8+6	2	2	0
	FW	(Serbia) SRB	Vladimir Gudelj	28	7	28	7	0	0
	FW	(Spain) ESP	Paco Salillas	26	3	11+13	3	2	0
	FW	(Spain) ESP	Salva	34	2	17+15	1	1+1	1
	FW	(Spain) ESP	Ismael Urzaiz	6	1	4+2	1	0	0

== Results ==
=== La Liga ===
==== League table ====
Pos	Team	Pld	W	D	L	GF	GA	GD	Pts
9	Zaragoza	38	11	13	14	37	52	−15	35
10	Osasuna	38	12	10	16	42	41	+1	34 (Note: OSA: 10 pts; CEL: 7 pts; SPG: 4 pts; RSO: 3 pts)
11	Celta Vigo	38	9	16	13	25	32	−7	34
12	Sporting Gijón	38	11	12	15	38	57	−19	34
13	Real Sociedad	38	13	8	17	46	59	−13	34

Source: LFP
Rules for classification: 1) points; 2) head-to-head points; 3) head-to-head goal difference; 4) head-to-head goals scored; 5) goal difference; 6) number of goals scored.

==== Matches ====
6 September 1992 1	Deportivo La Coruña	2 – 0	Celta Vigo	A Coruña, Spain
	Bebeto 30' (pen.); Barragán 35'	Report		Stadium: Estadio Riazor; Referee: José María García-Aranda

13 September 1992 2	Celta Vigo	0 – 0	Valencia	Vigo, Spain
		Report		Stadium: Balaídos; Referee: Joaquín Ramos Marcos

19 September 1992 3	Logroñés	0 – 1	Celta Vigo	Logroño, Spain
		Report	20' Ratković	Stadium: Estadio Las Gaunas; Referee: Francesc Casajuana Rifà

27 September 1992 4	Celta Vigo	1 – 0	Athletic Bilbao	Vigo, Spain
	Gudelj 33' (pen.)	Report		Stadium: Balaídos; Referee: José Pérez Sánchez

4 October 1992 5	Real Zaragoza	0 – 0	Celta Vigo	Zaragoza, Spain
		Report		Stadium: La Romareda; Referee: José Núñez Manrique

7 October 1992 6	Celta Vigo	0 – 1	Español	Vigo, Spain
		Report	79' Fonseca	Stadium: Balaídos; Referee: Juan Brito Arceo

18 October 1992 7	Cádiz CF	1 – 1	Celta Vigo	Cádiz, Spain
	Kiko 38'	Report	64' Salillas	Stadium: Ramón de Carranza; Referee: Juan Sánchez Moreno

25 October 1992 8	Celta Vigo	0 – 0	Real Oviedo	Vigo, Spain
		Report		Stadium: Balaídos; Referee: Tomás Jiménez Moreno

1 November 1992 9	Rayo Vallecano	0 – 1	Celta Vigo	Madrid, Spain
		Report	13' (pen.) Dadíe	Stadium: Nuevo Estadio de Vallecas; Referee: Carmelo Rodríguez Martel

8 November 1992 10	Celta Vigo	0 – 2	Atlético Madrid	Vigo, Spain
		Report	66' Alfaro; 89' Futre	Stadium: Balaídos; Referee: Francisco Santamaría Uzqueda

22 November 1992 11	Celta Vigo	1 – 2	Sevilla	Vigo, Spain
	Gudelj 3'	Report	6' Maradona; 9' Bango	Stadium: Balaídos; Referee: Manuel Díaz Vega

29 November 1992 12	Osasuna	3 – 0	Celta Vigo	Pamplona, Spain
	Larrainzar 45'; Kosecki 59'; Aguilà 89'	Report		Stadium: El Sadar; Referee: Miguel Marín López

6 December 1992 13	Celta Vigo	2 – 1	Real Sociedad	Vigo, Spain
	Bursać 12', 68'	Report	31' Oceano	Stadium: Balaídos; Referee: Ángel Calvo Córdova

13 December 1992 14	Real Madrid	1 – 0	Celta Vigo	Madrid, Spain
	Zamorano 83'	Report		Stadium: Santiago Bernabéu Stadium; Referee: Francesc Casajuana Rifà

20 December 1992 15	Celta Vigo	0 – 1	Tenerife	Vigo, Spain
		Report	48' Pizzi	Stadium: Balaídos; Referee: José María García-Aranda

3 January 1993 16	Barcelona	2 – 0	Celta Vigo	Barcelona, Spain
	Nadal 36'; Witschge 43'	Report		Stadium: Camp Nou; Referee: Victor José Esquinas Torres

10 January 1993 17	Celta Vigo	1 – 1	Real Burgos	Vigo, Spain
	Salillas 65'	Report	77' Limperger	Stadium: Balaídos; Referee: Juan Fernández Marín

17 January 1993 18	Sporting de Gijón	0 – 3	Celta Vigo	Gijón, Spain
		Report	47' Ratković; 49' (pen.) Gudelj; 60' Otero	Stadium: El Molinón; Referee: Antonio López Nieto

24 January 1993 19	Celta Vigo	1 – 1	Albacete Balompié	Vigo, Spain
	Salillas 77'	Report	51' Pinilla	Stadium: Balaídos; Referee: Severo Javier González Lecue

31 January 1993 20	Celta Vigo	0 – 0	Deportivo La Coruña	Vigo, Spain
		Report		Stadium: Balaídos; Referee: Antonio Martin Navarrete

7 February 1993 21	Valencia	1 – 1	Celta Vigo	Valencia, Spain
	Cervera 32'	Report	72' Ratković	Stadium: Estadio Luis Casanova; Referee: José Núñez Manrique

14 February 1993 22	Celta Vigo	2 – 0	Logroñés	Vigo, Spain
	Gudelj 49'; Vicente 89'	Report		Stadium: Balaídos; Referee: Ángel Calvo Córdova

21 February 1993 23	Athletic Bilbao	0 – 1	Celta Vigo	Bilbao, Spain
		Report	9' Gudelj	Stadium: San Mamés; Referee: Clemente Rivas Fernández

28 February 1993 24	Celta Vigo	0 – 1	Real Zaragoza	Vigo, Spain
		Report	81' Solana	Stadium: Balaídos; Referee: Carmelo Rodríguez Martel

7 March 1993 25	Español	0 – 0	Celta Vigo	Barcelona, Spain
		Report		Stadium: Estadi de Sarrià; Referee: Juan Sánchez Moreno

14 March 1993 26	Celta Vigo	1 – 0	Cádiz CF	Vigo, Spain
	Ratković 79'	Report		Stadium: Balaídos; Referee: Victor José Esquinas Torres

21 March 1993 27	Real Oviedo	3 – 1	Celta Vigo	Oviedo, Spain
	Janković 2'; Rivas 66'; Armando Álvarez 83'	Report	86' (pen.) Gudelj	Stadium: Estadio Carlos Tartiere; Referee: Alonso Gómez López

4 April 1993 28	Celta Vigo	0 – 0	Rayo Vallecano	Vigo, Spain
		Report		Stadium: Celta Vigo; Referee: José Pajares Paz

11 April 1993 29	Atlético Madrid	1 – 1	Celta Vigo	Madrid, Spain
	Lukić 6'	Report	12' Gil	Stadium: Estadio Vicente Calderón; Referee: Juan Fernández Marín

18 April 1993 30	Sevilla	1 – 0	Celta Vigo	Seville, Spain
	Monchu 56'	Report		Stadium: Ramón Sánchez Pizjuán; Referee: Joaquín Urío Velázquez

2 May 1993 31	Celta Vigo	0 – 0	Osasuna	Vigo, Spain
		Report		Stadium: Balaídos; Referee: Juan Brito Arceo

9 May 1993 32	Real Sociedad	1 – 1	Celta Vigo	San Sebastián, Spain
	Alkiza 58'	Report	43' Mosquera	Stadium: Atotxa Stadium; Referee: Ángel Calvo Córdova

15 May 1993 33	Celta Vigo	1 – 1	Real Madrid	Vigo, Spain
	Gudelj 47'	Report	12' (pen.) Míchel	Stadium: Balaídos; Referee: Severo Javier González Lecue

23 May 1993 34	Tenerife	1 – 0	Celta Vigo	Santa Cruz de Tenerife, Spain
	Gómez 85'	Report		Stadium: Heliodoro Rodríguez López; Referee: Antonio López Nieto

30 May 1993 35	Celta Vigo	3 – 2	Barcelona	Vigo, Spain
	Vicente 5'; Ferrer 9' (o.g.); Salva 77'	Report	27' Laudrup; 85' Begiristain	Stadium: Balaídos; Referee: Juan Ansuátegui Roca

6 June 1993 36	Real Burgos	1 – 1	Celta Vigo	Burgos, Spain
	Herrera 57'	Report	29' Urzaiz	Stadium: Estadio El Plantío; Referee: José Carcelén García

13 June 1993 37	Celta Vigo	0 – 0	Sporting de Gijón	Vigo, Spain
		Report		Stadium: Balaídos; Referee: Juan Sánchez Moreno

20 June 1993 38	Albacete Balompié	1 – 0	Celta Vigo	Albacete, Spain
	Antonio 49'	Report		Stadium: Estadio Carlos Belmonte; Referee: Juan Andújar Oliver

=== Copa del Rey ===
==== Third round ====
15 October 1992 First leg	Benidorm	0 – 0	Celta Vigo	Benidorm, Spain
		Report		Stadium: Municipal de Foietes; Referee: Celino Gracia Redondo

12 November 1992 Second leg	Celta Vigo	3 – 4	Benidorm	Vigo, Spain
	Ratković 37'; Mosquera 79'; Salva 86'	Report	4' Villaescusa; 16' Andrés; 58', 81' Matías	Stadium: Balaídos; Referee: Clemente Rivas Fernández

Benidorm won 4–3 on aggregate
