= 1995–96 RC Celta de Vigo season =

Celta Vigo
1995–96 season
- President: Horacio Gómez
- Head coach: Carlos Aimar (until 17 October); Fernando Castro Santos (from 22 October)
- Stadium: Balaídos
- La Liga: 11th
- Copa del Rey: Round of 16
- Top goalscorer: League: Vladimir Gudelj (15); All: Vladimir Gudelj (16)
| Home colours | Away colours |

Celta Vigo contested La Liga and the Copa del Rey in the 1995–96 season. They placed 11th in La Liga, matching their best result since earning promotion in 1992. They were eliminated at the round of 16 stage in the Copa del Rey, losing 4–1 on aggregate to Valencia.

== Squad ==
Note: Flags indicate national team as defined under FIFA eligibility rules; some limited exceptions apply. Players may hold more than one non-FIFA nationality.

| No. | Pos. | Nation | Player |
|---|---|---|---|
| 1 | GK | ESP | Patxi Villanueva |
| 2 | DF | ESP | Alejo |
| 3 | DF | ESP | Mariano |
| 4 | DF | ESP | Patxi Salinas |
| 5 | MF | ARG | Hermes Desio |
| 6 | MF | ESP | Vicente (captain) |
| 7 | MF | BIH | Milorad Ratković |
| 8 | MF | ESP | Ángel Merino |
| 9 | MF | YUG | Goran Milojević |
| 10 | FW | BIH | Vladimir Gudelj |
| 11 | MF | ESP | José Gil |
| 12 | DF | ESP | Andoni Lakabeg |
| 13 | GK | ESP | Toni Prats |
| 14 | DF | ESP | Míchel Salgado |

| No. | Pos. | Nation | Player |
|---|---|---|---|
| 15 | MF | ESP | Eusebio |
| 16 | DF | ESP | Borja Agirretxu |
| 17 | DF | ESP | Rafael Berges |
| 18 | FW | ESP | Juan Sánchez |
| 19 | MF | YUG | Srđan Bajčetić |
| 20 | MF | ESP | Carlos Pérez |
| 21 | DF | ESP | José Manuel Tárraga |
| 22 | MF | ESP | Geli |
| 23 | GK | ESP | Sergio Aragoneses |
| — | DF | VEN | Javi González |
| — | DF | ESP | Rober |
| — | MF | ESP | Dani Vidal |
| — | FW | ESP | Fonsi |

== Squad stats ==
Last updated on 23 February 2021.

| No. | Pos | Nat | Player | Total | | La Liga | | Copa del Rey | |
| No. | Pos | Nat | Player | Apps | Goals | Apps | Goals | Apps | Goals |
|---|---|---|---|---|---|---|---|---|---|
| 13 | GK | (Spain) ESP | Toni Prats | 43 | 0 | 41 | 0 | 2 | 0 |
| 3 | DF | (Spain) ESP | Mariano | 27 | 0 | 24+3 | 0 | 0 | 0 |
| 2 | DF | (Spain) ESP | Alejo | 45 | 3 | 39+1 | 2 | 5 | 1 |
| 4 | DF | (Spain) ESP | Patxi Salinas | 44 | 0 | 40 | 0 | 4 | 0 |
| 17 | DF | (Spain) ESP | Rafael Berges | 33 | 1 | 29+1 | 0 | 3 | 1 |
| 5 | MF | (Argentina) ARG | Hermes Desio | 30 | 0 | 24+4 | 0 | 1+1 | 0 |
| 7 | MF | (Bosnia and Herzegovina) BIH | Milorad Ratković | 42 | 5 | 31+5 | 5 | 4+2 | 0 |
| 8 | MF | (Spain) ESP | Ángel Merino | 39 | 4 | 32+1 | 4 | 6 | 0 |
| 15 | MF | (Spain) ESP | Eusebio | 38 | 1 | 31+4 | 1 | 3 | 0 |
| 10 | FW | (Bosnia and Herzegovina) BIH | Vladimir Gudelj | 42 | 16 | 32+5 | 15 | 3+2 | 1 |
| 18 | FW | (Spain) ESP | Juan Sánchez | 43 | 12 | 31+6 | 10 | 3+3 | 2 |
| 1 | GK | (Spain) ESP | Patxi Villanueva | 5 | 0 | 1 | 0 | 4 | 0 |
| 11 | MF | (Spain) ESP | José Gil | 30 | 1 | 22+7 | 1 | 1 | 0 |
| 16 | DF | (Spain) ESP | Borja Agirretxu | 32 | 0 | 24+3 | 0 | 4+1 | 0 |
| 6 | MF | (Spain) ESP | Vicente | 23 | 0 | 6+14 | 0 | 0+3 | 0 |
| 9 | MF | (Federal Republic of Yugoslavia) YUG | Goran Milojević | 31 | 11 | 10+15 | 6 | 5+1 | 5 |
| 12 | DF | (Spain) ESP | Andoni Lakabeg | 9 | 0 | 4+5 | 0 | 0 | 0 |
| 14 | DF | (Spain) ESP | Míchel Salgado | 23 | 0 | 2+16 | 0 | 5 | 0 |
| 19 | MF | (Federal Republic of Yugoslavia) YUG | Srđan Bajčetić | 18 | 2 | 11+4 | 2 | 2+1 | 0 |
| 20 | MF | (Spain) ESP | Carlos Pérez | 15 | 2 | 4+8 | 2 | 3 | 0 |
| 21 | DF | (Spain) ESP | José Manuel Tárraga | 26 | 0 | 17+5 | 0 | 4 | 0 |
| 22 | MF | (Spain) ESP | Geli | 27 | 1 | 7+15 | 1 | 3+2 | 0 |
| 23 | GK | (Spain) ESP | Sergio Aragoneses | 0 | 0 | 0 | 0 | 0 | 0 |
| | DF | (Venezuela) VEN | Javi González | 1 | 0 | 0 | 0 | 0+1 | 0 |
| | DF | (Spain) ESP | Rober | 1 | 0 | 0 | 0 | 0+1 | 0 |
| | MF | (Spain) ESP | Dani Vidal | 0 | 0 | 0 | 0 | 0 | 0 |
| | FW | (Spain) ESP | Fonsi | 1 | 0 | 0 | 0 | 1 | 0 |

== Results ==
=== La Liga ===
==== League table ====
| Pos | Team | Pld | W | D | L | GF | GA | GD | Pts |
|---|---|---|---|---|---|---|---|---|---|
| 9 | Deportivo La Coruña | 42 | 16 | 13 | 13 | 63 | 44 | +19 | 61 |
| 10 | Compostela | 42 | 17 | 8 | 17 | 47 | 54 | −7 | 59 |
| 11 | Celta Vigo | 42 | 12 | 16 | 14 | 49 | 51 | −2 | 52 |
| 12 | Sevilla | 42 | 11 | 15 | 16 | 43 | 55 | −12 | 48 (Note: SEV: 10 pts;ZAR: 8 pts; ROV: 6 pts → ROV 0–0 ATH; ATH: 6 pts → ATH 0–1 ROV) |
| 13 | Zaragoza | 42 | 11 | 15 | 16 | 51 | 59 | −8 | 48 |

Source: LFP
Rules for classification: 1) points; 2) head-to-head points; 3) head-to-head goal difference; 4) head-to-head goals scored; 5) goal difference; 6) number of goals scored.

==== Matches ====
| 3 September 1995 1 | Celta Vigo | 0 – 1 | Compostela | Vigo, Spain |
| | | Report | 75' Bellido | Stadium: Balaídos; Referee: Fernando Carmona Méndez |

| 10 September 1995 2 | Salamanca | 0 – 1 | Celta Vigo | Villares de la Reina, Spain |
| | | Report | 65' Milojević | Stadium: Estadio Helmántico; Referee: Manuel Díaz Vega |

| 17 September 1995 3 | Celta Vigo | 2 – 2 | Tenerife | Vigo, Spain |
| | Sánchez 9'; Bajčetić 37' | Report | 27' Pizzi; 44' (o.g.) Berges | Stadium: Balaídos; Referee: José Japón Sevilla |

| 24 September 1995 4 | Albacete Balompié | 4 – 0 | Celta Vigo | Albacete, Spain |
| | Zalazar 50', 80' (pen.); Sánchez 54'; Coco 63' | Report | | Stadium: Estadio Carlos Belmonte; Referee: José Núñez Manrique |

| 1 October 1995 5 | Celta Vigo | 1 – 1 | Real Sociedad | Vigo, Spain |
| | Gil 44' | Report | 36' Pürk | Stadium: Balaídos; Referee: Manuel Mejuto González |

| 4 October 1995 6 | Racing Santander | 2 – 1 | Celta Vigo | Santander, Spain |
| | Popov 33'; Adepoju 72' | Report | 24' Sánchez | Stadium: El Sardinero; Referee: Juan Brito Arceo |

| 8 October 1995 7 | Celta Vigo | 0 – 3 | Atlético Madrid | Vigo, Spain |
| | | Report | Simeone 34'; Kiko 58', 67' | Stadium: Balaídos; Referee: Juan Fernández Marín |

| 15 October 1995 8 | Sporting de Gijón | 1 – 0 | Celta Vigo | Gijón, Spain |
| | Sabou 46' | Report | | Stadium: El Molinón; Referee: Juan Ansuátegui Roca |

| 22 October 1995 9 | Celta Vigo | 4 – 0 | Sevilla | Vigo, Spain |
| | Gudelj 21', 85', 89'; Pérez 82' | Report | | Stadium: Balaídos; Referee: Arturo Daudén Ibáñez |

| 29 October 1995 10 | Espanyol | 2 – 2 | Celta Vigo | Barcelona, Spain |
| | Lardín 19', 60' | Report | 74' (pen.) Gudelj; 79' Sánchez | Stadium: Estadi de Sarrià; Referee: Carlos Megía Dávila |

| 5 November 1995 11 | Athletic Bilbao | 3 – 0 | Celta Vigo | Bilbao, Spain |
| | Alejo 26' (o.g.); Andrinúa 28'; García 55' | Report | | Stadium: San Mamés; Referee: Fernando Carmona Méndez |

| 11 November 1995 12 | Celta Vigo | 0 – 0 | Deportivo La Coruña | Vigo, Spain |
| | | Report | | Stadium: Balaídos; Referee: Antonio López Nieto |

| 19 November 1995 13 | Real Valladolid | 1 – 1 | Celta Vigo | Valladolid, Spain |
| | Peternac 60' (pen.) | Report | 71' (pen.) Gudelj | Stadium: José Zorrilla; Referee: José María García-Aranda |

| 26 November 1995 14 | Celta Vigo | 2 – 0 | Mérida | Vigo, Spain |
| | Ratković 44'; Bajčetić 64' | Report | | Stadium: Balaídos; Referee: Celino Gracia Redondo |

| 3 December 1995 15 | Real Zaragoza | 0 – 0 | Celta Vigo | Zaragoza, Spain |
| | | Report | | Stadium: La Romareda; Referee: César Barrenechea Montero |

| 10 December 1995 16 | Celta Vigo | 2 – 0 | Rayo Vallecano | Vigo, Spain |
| | Sánchez 12'; Milojević 88' | Report | | Stadium: Balaídos; Referee: Juan Ansuátegui Roca |

| 17 December 1995 17 | Real Madrid | 1 – 0 | Celta Vigo | Madrid, Spain |
| | Benito 29' | Report | | Stadium: Santiago Bernabéu Stadium; Referee: Arturo Daudén Ibáñez |

| 20 December 1995 18 | Celta Vigo | 1 – 0 | Real Oviedo | Vigo, Spain |
| | Gudelj 89' | Report | | Stadium: Balaídos; Referee: José Prados García |

| 3 January 1996 19 | Real Betis | 0 – 3 | Celta Vigo | Seville, Spain |
| | | Report | 54' Merino; 64' Gudelj; 72' Geli | Stadium: Benito Villamarín; Referee: Carlos Megía Dávila |

| 7 January 1996 20 | Celta Vigo | 1 – 0 | Barcelona | Vigo, Spain |
| | Sánchez 57' | Report | | Stadium: Balaídos; Referee: José María García-Aranda |

| 14 January 1996 21 | Valencia | 3 – 0 | Celta Vigo | Valencia, Spain |
| | Romero 18'; Arroyo 53'; Poyatos 89' | Report | | Stadium: Mestalla Stadium; Referee: Manuel Díaz Vega |

| 21 January 1996 22 | Compostela | 1 – 1 | Celta Vigo | Santiago de Compostela, Spain |
| | Christensen 15' | Report | 28' Sánchez | Stadium: Estadio Multiusos de San Lázaro; Referee: Eduardo Iturralde González |

| 24 January 1996 23 | Celta Vigo | 2 – 1 | Salamanca | Vigo, Spain |
| | Eusebio 22'; Ratković 30' | Report | 38' Barragán | Stadium: Balaídos; Referee: Celino Gracia Redondo |

| 28 January 1996 24 | Tenerife | 1 – 0 | Celta Vigo | Santa Cruz de Tenerife, Spain |
| | Mata 28' | Report | | Stadium: Helidoro Rodríguez López; Referee: Juan Fernández Marín |

| 4 February 1996 25 | Celta Vigo | 2 – 2 | Albacete Balompié | Vigo, Spain |
| | Gudelj 36' (pen.); Milojević 73' | Report | 47' (pen.), 81' Zalazar | Stadium: Balaídos; Referee: Antonio López Nieto |

| 11 February 1996 26 | Real Sociedad | 3 – 1 | Celta Vigo | San Sebastián, Spain |
| | Craioveanu 22', 74'; Alejo 85' (o.g.) | Report | 89' Milojević | Stadium: Anoeta; Referee: José Prados García |

| 18 February 1996 27 | Celta Vigo | 0 – 0 | Racing Santander | Vigo, Spain |
| | | Report | | Stadium: Balaídos; Referee: Arturo Daudén Ibáñez |

| 25 February 1996 28 | Atlético Madrid | 3 – 2 | Celta Vigo | Madrid, Spain |
| | Juan Carlos 15'; Simeone 21'; Caminero 72' | Report | 7', 44' Gudelj | Stadium: Estadio Vicente Calderón; Referee: Carmelo Rodríguez Martel |

| 3 March 1996 29 | Celta Vigo | 0 – 0 | Sporting de Gijón | Vigo, Spain |
| | | Report | | Stadium: Balaídos; Referee: José Rubio Valdivieso |

| 10 March 1996 30 | Sevilla | 0 – 0 | Celta Vigo | Seville, Spain |
| | | Report | | Stadium: Ramón Sánchez Pizjuán; Referee: Carlos Megía Dávila |

| 17 March 1996 31 | Celta Vigo | 4 – 2 | Espanyol | Vigo, Spain |
| | Gudelj 7' (pen.), 37'; Ratković 10'; Merino 20' | Report | 48', 59' Lardín | Stadium: Balaídos; Referee: José Núñez Manrique |

| 24 March 1996 32 | Celta Vigo | 3 – 1 | Athletic Bilbao | Vigo, Spain |
| | Ratković 26'; Sánchez 39'; Merino 47' | Report | 44' Bolo | Stadium: Balaídos; Referee: Manuel Mejuto González |

| 27 March 1996 33 | Deportivo La Coruña | 2 – 1 | Celta Vigo | A Coruña, Spain |
| | Manjarín 19'; Bebeto 83' | Report | 89' Sánchez | Stadium: Estadio Riazor; Referee: Juan Ansuátegui Roca |

| 31 March 1996 34 | Celta Vigo | 1 – 1 | Real Valladolid | Vigo, Spain |
| | Merino 44' | Report | 79' Gutiérrez | Stadium: Balaídos; Referee: Victor José Esquinas Torres |

| 7 April 1996 35 | Mérida | 2 – 0 | Celta Vigo | Mérida, Spain |
| | Prieto 20', 89' | Report | | Stadium: Estadio Romano; Referee: Alonso Gómez López |

| 14 April 1996 36 | Celta Vigo | 1 – 1 | Real Zaragoza | Vigo, Spain |
| | Ratković 9' | Report | 67' (pen.) Aragón | Stadium: Balaídos; Referee: César Barrenechea Montero |

| 21 April 1996 37 | Rayo Vallecano | 1 – 3 | Celta Vigo | Madrid, Spain |
| | Aquino 42' (pen.) | Report | 1' Sánchez; 8' Milojević; 16' Alejo | Stadium: Estadio Teresa Rivero; Referee: Carmelo Rodríguez Martel |

| 28 April 1996 38 | Celta Vigo | 1 – 1 | Real Madrid | Vigo, Spain |
| | Sánchez 12' | Report | 11' Zamorano | Stadium: Balaídos; Referee: Juan Ansuátegui Roca |

| 5 May 1996 39 | Real Oviedo | 1 – 1 | Celta Vigo | Oviedo, Spain |
| | Christiansen 72' (pen.) | Report | 9' Gudelj | Stadium: Estadio Carlos Tartiere; Referee: José Rubio Valdivieso |

| 12 May 1996 40 | Celta Vigo | 2 – 0 | Real Betis | Vigo, Spain |
| | Gudelj 47'; Pérez 89' | Report | | Stadium: Balaídos; Referee: José María García-Aranda |

| 19 May 1996 41 | Barcelona | 3 – 2 | Celta Vigo | Barcelona, Spain |
| | Cuéllar 71'; Óscar García 77', 88' | Report | 44' Alejo; 52' Gudelj | Stadium: Camp Nou; Referee: Juan Brito Arceo |

| 25 May 1996 42 | Celta Vigo | 1 – 1 | Valencia | Vigo, Spain |
| | Milojević 89' | Report | 43' Mijatović | Stadium: Balaídos; Referee: Antonio López Nieto |

=== Copa del Rey ===
==== Second round ====
| 25 October 1995 First leg | Endesa As Pontes | 0 – 0 | Celta Vigo | As Pontes de García Rodríguez, Spain |
| | | Report | | Stadium: O Poboado; Referee: César Barrenechea Montero |

| 7 November 1995 Second leg | Celta Vigo | 2 – 1 | Endesa As Pontes | Vigo, Spain |
| | Gudelj 33'; Berges 78' | Report | 65' (pen.) Ramiro | Stadium: Balaídos; Referee: Eduardo Iturralde González |

Celta Vigo won 2–1 on aggregate

==== Third round ====
| 29 November 1995 First leg | Andorra | 0 – 5 | Celta Vigo | Andorra la Vella, Andorra |
| | | Report | Alejo 1'; Milojević 10', 20', 66'; Sánchez 44' | Stadium: Estadi Comunal d'Andorra la Vella; Attendance: 1,100; Referee: José Manuel Andradas Asurmendi |

| 13 December 1995 Second leg | Celta Vigo | 2 – 0 | Andorra | Vigo, Spain |
| | Milojević 26', 65' | Report | | Stadium: Balaídos; Attendance: 7,000; Referee: Alonso Gómez López |

Celta Vigo won 7–0 on aggregate

==== Round of 16 ====
| 10 January 1996 First leg | Celta Vigo | 1 – 1 | Valencia | Vigo, Spain |
| 21:00 CET | Sánchez 63' | Report | 12' Fernando | Stadium: Balaídos; Referee: Victor José Esquinas Torres (substituted off) 77'; Referee: Ignacio Iglesias (substituted in) 77' |

| 17 January 1996 Second leg | Valencia | 3 – 0 | Celta Vigo | Valencia, Spain |
| 21:00 CET | Mijatović 21' (pen.); Arroyo 36'; Gálvez 56' | Report | | Stadium: Mestalla Stadium; Attendance: 45,000; Referee: José Japón Sevilla |

Valencia won 4–1 on aggregate
