= José Gil (footballer) =

Spanish footballer (born 1960)

Personal information
- Full name: José Gil Gordillo
- Date of birth: 9 October 1960 (age 66)
- Place of birth: Sanlúcar de Barrameda, Spain
- Height: 1.74 m (5 ft 9 in)
- Position: Winger

Senior career*
Years	Team	Apps	(Gls)
1979–1980	Cádiz CF		
1980–1985	Barcelona Atlètic	104	(5)
1985–1991	Deportivo La Coruña	205	(30)
1991–1996	Celta Vigo	174	(8)
1996–1997	Racing de Ferrol	15	(0)
Total		498	(43)
- * Club domestic league appearances and goals

José Gil Gordillo (born 9 October 1960), sometimes known as Flaco Gil, is a retired Spanish football player who played as a winger. He made 137 appearances in La Liga for Celta Vigo in the 1990s, scoring five goals.

== Career ==
Gil was born in Sanlúcar de Barrameda in Cádiz province, part of the autonomous community of Andalusia, and began his career with local side Cádiz CF. He left to join Barcelona in 1980, playing exclusively for their B team, Barcelona Atlètic, over the next five seasons. He signed for Atlètic's Segunda División rivals Deportivo La Coruña in 1985, and was a key part of the team for six years, during which time he amassed 235 appearances and 33 goals. During a home match against Recreativo de Huelva at Estadio Riazor on 11 December 1988, he was forced to play in goal for the last few minutes after goalkeeper Jorge García was sent off. His first task was to face the resulting penalty, which was fired off target by Melenas. Gil kept a clean sheet throughout stoppage time as Depor held on for a 2–1 victory.

Gil helped Deportivo to fourth place in 1989–90, qualifying them for a promotion playoff. They faced Tenerife, and were defeated thanks to a single goal in the second leg at Estadio Riazor, and thus remained in the second tier. The following season was even better, with Depor finishing as runners-up, just a point behind champions Albacete Balompié, and earning promotion to La Liga for the first time since 1972–73.

However, Gil would not join the club in the top flight, as he left to join local rivals Celta Vigo that summer. Celta, under coach Txetxu Rojo, followed Deportivo's lead by earning promotion to La Liga in Gil's first season, and the man from Cádiz played a key part. Used in partnership with fellow midfielders Vicente or Fabiano, Gil regularly provided assists for Vladimir Gudelj, who finished the season as the division's top scorer. Los Celestes went one better than Depor had the previous year by also becoming Segunda División champions. This time he did manage to make his top division debut, which curiously came in the Galician derby against his former club Deportivo. The match, held at Estadio Riazor, ended in a 2–0 defeat for Celta.

Gil continued to be an indispensable part of the team that season, playing 36 matches. He also netted his first top flight goal on 11 April, scoring in a 1–1 away draw with Atlético Madrid at Vicente Calderón Stadium. Celta finished the season in a creditable 11th place. In 1993–94, Gil had his busiest season at the club, making 41 appearances, including helping Los Celestes reach the final of the Copa del Rey. Gil replaced Milorad Ratković after an hour in the final, held at Vicente Calderón Stadium, which ultimately ended with Celta's defeat on penalties by Real Zaragoza after a 0–0 draw.

Gil also played 40 times during the following season, before his appearances started to diminish due to injury problems during the 1995–96 season. He made his last appearance for Los Celestes in the final match of that season, a 1–1 home draw with Valencia at Balaídos on 25 May, as did his long-time midfield partner Vicente. He left Celta after 186 appearances and eight goals in five successful seasons. He rounded out his career with a single season at Racing de Ferrol in Segunda División B, before retiring in 1997 as he approached his 37th birthday.

== Honours ==
Deportivo La Coruña

- Segunda División runners-up: 1990–91

Celta Vigo

- Segunda División: 1991–92
- Copa del Rey runners-up: 1993–94

== Career statistics ==
As of 27 February 2021

Club	Season	League			Cup		Other		Total	
Club	Season	Division	Apps	Goals	Apps	Goals	Apps	Goals	Apps	Goals
Barcelona Atlètic	1980–81	Segunda División B	33	1	0	0	–		33	1
Barcelona Atlètic	1982–83	Segunda División	24	1	5	0	2	0	31	1
Barcelona Atlètic	1983–84	Segunda División	14	2	5	0	0	0	19	2
Barcelona Atlètic	1984–85	Segunda División	33	1	5	0	0	0	38	1
Barcelona Atlètic	Total		104	5	15	0	2	0	121	5
Deportivo La Coruña	1985–86	Segunda División	36	4	5	0	0	0	41	4
Deportivo La Coruña	1986–87	Segunda División	32	3	1	0	–		33	3
Deportivo La Coruña	1987–88	Segunda División	31	2	1	0	–		32	2
Deportivo La Coruña	1988–89	Segunda División	36	6	13	2	–		49	8
Deportivo La Coruña	1989–90	Segunda División	32	7	2	1	1	0	35	8
Deportivo La Coruña	1990–91	Segunda División	38	8	7	0	–		45	8
Deportivo La Coruña	Total		205	30	29	3	1	0	235	33
Celta Vigo	1991–92	Segunda División	37	3	2	0	–		39	3
Celta Vigo	1992–93	La Liga	36	1	0	0	–		36	1
Celta Vigo	1993–94	La Liga	35	1	6	0	–		41	1
Celta Vigo	1994–95	La Liga	37	2	3	0	–		40	2
Celta Vigo	1995–96	La Liga	29	1	1	0	–		30	1
Celta Vigo	Total		174	8	12	0	0	0	186	8
Racing de Ferrol	1996–97	Segunda División B	15	0	4	0	–		19	0
Career total			498	43	60	3	3	0	561	46

1. Appearances in the 1983 Copa de la Liga Segunda División
2. Appearance in the 1989–90 Segunda División promotion playoff
