= José Ángel Uribarrena =

Spanish footballer (born 1969)

Personal information
- Full name: José Ángel Uribarrena Díez
- Date of birth: 8 January 1969 (age 57)
- Place of birth: Portugalete, Spain
- Height: 1.78 m (5 ft 10 in)
- Position: Forward

Youth career
- Athletic Bilbao

Senior career*
Years	Team	Apps	(Gls)
1987–1991	Bilbao Athletic	119	(36)
1989–1994	Athletic Bilbao	22	(1)
1991–1992	→ Logroñés (loan)	22	(2)
1992–1993	→ Logroñés (loan)	23	(1)
1994–1995	Celta Vigo	25	(1)
1995–1997	Almería	19	(0)
1997–2000	Aurrerá de Vitoria	65	(8)
2000–2001	GD Chaves		
Total		295	(49)
- * Club domestic league appearances and goals

José Ángel Uribarrena Díez (born 8 January 1969), sometimes known as Jon Uribarrena, is a Spanish former professional footballer who played as a forward.

He spent the majority of his career with Athletic Bilbao, and amassed 92 La Liga appearances and five goals during his time with Athletic, two loan spells at Logroñés, and a season playing for Celta Vigo.

== Career ==
Uribarrena was born in Portugalete, close to Bilbao in the province of Biscay, in the autonomous community of the Basque Country, and began his career in the youth teams of Athletic Bilbao. He made his debut for their B team, Bilbao Athletic, aged just 17, in a home Segunda División match against Recreativo de Huelva on 4 January 1987. Coach Txetxu Rojo brought him on for the second half at Lezama in place of Julen del Val, during which they equalised through Ricardo Mendiguren and held on for a 1–1 draw.

He began to take a major role with the B team during the following season, in which they were relegated. In 1988–89, however, he was the team's top scorer as they won their Segunda División B group to earn promotion back to the second tier at the first attempt. First team coach Howard Kendall gave him his La Liga debut on 29 October 1989, in a 3–0 win over Málaga, and during that season and 1990–91 he combined occasional first team appearances with regular B team starts.

Uribarrena spent the 1991–92 season on loan at Logroñés, where he scored his first top flight goal in a 2–2 home draw with Barcelona at Estadio Las Gaunas. After just one Copa del Rey appearance for Athletic at the start of the following season, he returned for a second loan spell at Logroñés in November 1992. He played 45 first division matches across his two spells in Logroño.

1993–94 was Uribarrena's best season for Athletic, as he made 19 appearances and scored his only goal for the first team, in a 1–1 home draw with Sevilla at San Mamés on 24 April. He finally left Bilbao for good on 29 August 1994, signing for Celta Vigo and bringing an end to eight years at San Mamés which saw him make a total of 31 first team appearances.

The summer of 1994 was one of great upheaval for Celta, with key players including Santiago Cañizares, Stjepan Andrijašević, Jorge Otero and Vicente Engonga departing. They were replaced by an influx of lesser-known players, such as José Manuel Tárraga, Ángel Merino, Hermes Desio and Uribarrena, who signed for two years with an option of a third, and earned Athletic a fee of 30 million pesetas. That summer also saw coach Txetxu Rojo, who had coached Uribarrena at Bilbao Athletic, depart for Osasuna, and be replaced by Carlos Aimar, who had done likewise at Logroñés. Uribarrena made his debut for Los Celestes on 4 September in an away game against Albacete Balompié at Estadio Carlos Belmonte, and marked the occasion with a goal, nodding home a free kick after 42 minutes to give his side the lead. The match ended 1–1.

Celta finished the season in mid-table, and although Uribarrena played 25 matches, he failed to add to his goal tally. He had failed to win over either Celta's coaching staff or their fans, and he was transfer listed that summer, despite having a year left on his contract. He left the club in July 1995, signing for Almería in the Segunda División. He made 22 appearances during his first season, failing to score, but didn't play at all in 1996–97. In 1997 he signed for Aurrerá de Vitoria in the third tier, where he spent the next three seasons. He then moved to Portugal, spending the 2000–01 season with GD Chaves in the Segunda Liga before retiring at the age of 32.

== Career statistics ==
Appearances and goals by club, season and competition
Club	Season	League			Cup		Total	
Club	Season	Division	Apps	Goals	Apps	Goals	Apps	Goals
Bilbao Athletic	1986–87	Segunda División	1	0	0	0	1	0
Bilbao Athletic	1987–88	Segunda División	23	5	0	0	23	5
Bilbao Athletic	1988–89	Segunda División B	36	20	–		36	20
Bilbao Athletic	1989–90	Segunda División	30	5	0	0	30	5
Bilbao Athletic	1990–91	Segunda División	29	6	–		29	6
Bilbao Athletic	Total		119	36	0	0	119	36
Athletic Bilbao	1989–90	La Liga	2	0	0	0	2	0
Athletic Bilbao	1990–91	La Liga	5	0	4	0	9	0
Athletic Bilbao	1992–93	La Liga	0	0	1	0	1	0
Athletic Bilbao	1993–94	La Liga	15	1	4	0	19	1
Athletic Bilbao	Total		22	1	9	0	31	1
Logroñés	1991–92	La Liga	22	2	8	2	30	4
Logroñés	1992–93	La Liga	23	1	0	0	23	1
Logroñés	Total		45	3	8	2	53	5
Celta Vigo	1994–95	La Liga	25	1	3	0	28	1
Almería	1995–96	Segunda División	19	0	3	0	22	0
Almería	1996–97	Segunda División	0	0	0	0	0	0
Almería	Total		19	0	3	0	22	0
Aurrerá de Vitoria	1997–98	Segunda División B	32	8	0	0	32	8
Aurrerá de Vitoria	1998–99	Segunda División B	30	0	–		30	0
Aurrerá de Vitoria	1999–2000	Segunda División B	3	0	0	0	3	0
Aurrerá de Vitoria	Total		65	8	0	0	65	8
Career total			295	49	23	2	318	51

== Honours ==
Bilbao Athletic

- Segunda División B: 1988–89
