= 1994 Copa del Rey final =

Copa del Rey 1994 final
- Event: 1993–94 Copa del Rey
Celta Vigo	Zaragoza
0	0
- After extra time Zaragoza won 5–4 on penalties
- Date: 20 April 1994
- Venue: Vicente Calderón Stadium, Madrid
- Referee: Antonio Jesús López Nieto
- Attendance: 60,000

The 1994 Copa del Rey final was the 92nd final of the Spanish cup competition, the Copa del Rey. The final was played at Vicente Calderón Stadium in Madrid on 20 April 1994. The match was won by Real Zaragoza, who beat Celta de Vigo in penalty shoot-out.

== Match details ==
20 April 1994
21:30 CET

Celta de Vigo	0–0 (a.e.t.)	Real Zaragoza
	Report (in Spanish)
Penalties
Andrijašević (penalty scored); Gudelj (penalty scored); Dadíe (penalty scored); Losada (penalty scored); Alejo (penalty missed)	4−5	(penalty scored) Cáceres; (penalty scored) Nayim; (penalty scored) Franco; (penalty scored) Gay; (penalty scored) Higuera

Vicente Calderón Stadium, Madrid
Attendance: 60,000
Referee: Antonio Jesús López Nieto

Celta de Vigo

Real Zaragoza

GK	1	(Spain) Santiago Cañizares
DF	5	(Spain) Luis Dadíe
DF	2	(Spain) Alejo	(yellow card) 60'
DF	4	(Spain) Patxi Salinas
DF	3	(Spain) Jorge Otero	(yellow card) 96'
MF	11	(Spain) Salva		(substituted off) 95'
MF	9	(Croatia) Stjepan Andrijašević	(yellow card) 15'
MF	8	(Spain) Vicente Engonga
MF	6	(Spain) Vicente (c)
MF	7	(Socialist Federal Republic of Yugoslavia) Milorad Ratković	(yellow card) 4'	(substituted off) 59'
FW	10	(Bosnia and Herzegovina) Vladimir Gudelj
Substitutes:
DF	12	(Spain) Borja Agirretxu
GK	13	(Spain) Patxi Villanueva
MF	14	(Spain) José Gil		(substituted on) 59'
FW	15	(Spain) Sebastián Losada		(substituted on) 95'
FW	16	(Spain) Carlos
Manager:
(Spain) Txetxu Rojo

GK	1	(Spain) Andoni Cedrún
DF	2	(Spain) Alberto Belsué
DF	4	(Argentina) Fernando Cáceres
DF	6	(Spain) Xavier Aguado
DF	3	(Spain) Jesús Solana
MF	9	(Spain) Nayim
MF	5	(Spain) José Aurelio Gay
MF	8	(Spain) Santiago Aragón	(yellow card) 45' (red card) 90'
MF	11	(Uruguay) Gustavo Poyet		(substituted off) 72'
FW	10	(Spain) Francisco Higuera
FW	7	(Spain) Miguel Pardeza (c)		(substituted off) 90+1'
Substitutes:
DF	12	(Spain) Iñigo Lizarralde
GK	13	(Spain) Juanmi
MF	14	(Argentina) Darío Franco		(substituted on) 90+1'
MF	15	(Spain) Jesús García Sanjuán		(substituted on) 72'
FW	16	(Spain) Moisés
Manager:
(Spain) Víctor Fernández

MATCH RULES

- 90 minutes.
- 30 minutes of extra-time if necessary.
- Penalty shoot-out if scores still level.
- Five named substitutes.
- Maximum of two substitutions.
