= Borja Agirretxu =

Spanish association football player

Personal information
- Full name: Francisco de Borja Agirretxu Barreiro
- Date of birth: 25 August 1968 (age 58)
- Place of birth: Getxo, Spain
- Height: 1.75 m (5 ft 9 in)
- Position: Left back

Youth career
- –1986: Athletic Bilbao

Senior career*
Years	Team	Apps	(Gls)
1986–1990	Athletic Bilbao B	95	(3)
1990–1992	Athletic Bilbao	17	(0)
1990–1991	→ Real Valladolid (loan)	2	(0)
1991–1992	→ Celta Vigo (loan)	34	(0)
1992–1997	Celta Vigo	118	(1)
1997–1999	Compostela	43	(0)
2005–2007	Leioa	33	(0)
Total		342	(4)
- * Club domestic league appearances and goals

Francisco de Borja Agirretxu Barreiro (born 11 November 1971), known as Borja Agirretxu in Basque or Borja Aguirrechu in Spanish, is a Spanish retired footballer who played as a left back.

He began his career with Athletic Bilbao, and also had spells with Real Valladolid, Celta Vigo, and Compostela, amassing a total of 148 La Liga appearances, scoring once. Six years after leaving Compostela, he resurrected his career with two seasons at Leioa.

== Career ==
=== Athletic Bilbao ===
Agirretxu was born in Getxo in Biscay, in the autonomous community of the Basque Country, and began his career in the youth teams of Basque giants Athletic Bilbao. He made his debut for Athletic Bilbao B during the 1986–87 Segunda División season, and was part of the team that was relegated the following season. However, he played a key role as they won their Segunda División B group in 1988–89 to earn promotion back to the second tier at the first attempt. Agirretxu was a fixture in the starting line-up in both the relegation and promotion seasons, as well as the first half of the following campaign, before his form earned him a call-up to the first team in early 1990.

Coach Txetxu Rojo deemed him ready to join the first team, and he made his La Liga debut in the Basque derby against Real Sociedad at Atotxa Stadium on 21 January 1990, aged 21. Agirretxu helped the visitors keep a clean sheet in a 0–0 draw, and this performance convinced Rojo he should remain a member of the first team for the rest of the season, during which time he made 17 appearances. However, Rojo was sacked at the end of the season, and new coach Javier Clemente was unconvinced by Agirretxu's potential, so he was sent out on loan to Real Valladolid for the duration of the 1990–91 season. This proved to be something of a waste of time, as he was used just four times in all competitions during his loan spell.

=== Celta Vigo ===
Agirretxu was loaned out again in the summer of 1991, this time joining Celta Vigo in the Segunda División, once again coming under the leadership of Txetxu Rojo. Rojo again showed faith in Agirretxu, who played 34 times that season as Celta won the league and earned promotion to La Liga. Following this success, Agirretxu's loan deal was converted into a permanent transfer ahead of the 1992–93 campaign. It was to be another strong season for both player and club, as Agirretxu appeared 33 times, and Celta easily retained their top flight status. The following year, Agirretxu only played 17 matches, but he did help Celta to the final of the Copa del Rey, which they lost on penalties to Real Zaragoza.

Over the next three seasons, Agirretxu was not an undisputed starter, but did appear at least 20 times each year. He scored the only La Liga goal of his career on 5 May 1995, which turned out to be the only goal of the game as Celta earned a 1–0 home victory over Real Valladolid at Balaídos. However, another game against Valladolid on the same ground two seasons later would bring an undignified end to his Celta career. Following the match on 4 January 1997, which Celta lost 2–0, he tested positive for nandrolone, a banned anabolic steroid. He was immediately dropped by Celta, and at the end of the season was banned until the following December, meaning that he went almost a full year without playing.

Agirretxu always strongly denied intentionally taking nandrolone, blaming the positive test initially on hair loss pills, and latterly on a mistake by the Celta medical team. Nonetheless, his Celta career was over, and he left the club having made 171 appearances in six seasons, scoring once.

=== Later career ===
With his ban still in place, Agirretxu joined Compostela ahead of the 1997–98 season. When the ban finally expired, he made his debut for the club in a 1–1 away draw with Real Oviedo at Estadio Carlos Tartiere on 4 January 1998, the anniversary of his offence. He started the match on the bench, being introduced as a substitute in place of Fabiano. He played 11 times that year, but couldn't prevent Compostela being relegated from La Liga.

The following season, Compostela were keen to bounce straight back to the top flight, but they fell well short. Agirretxu was a regular starter, playing 35 games in all competitions, but he made the decision to retire in the summer of 1999, shortly before his 31st birthday.

However, he came out of retirement six years later, joining minnows Leioa, of his native province, in the División de Honor de Vizcaya. He spent two seasons with the club before retiring for good in 2007 at the age of 38.

== Honours ==
Athletic Bilbao B

- Segunda División B: 1988–89

Celta Vigo

- Segunda División: 1991–92
- Copa del Rey runners-up: 1993–94

== Career statistics ==
As of 18 January 2021

Club	Season	League			Cup		Total	
Club	Season	Division	Apps	Goals	Apps	Goals	Apps	Goals
Athletic Bilbao B	1986–87	Segunda División	5	0	1	0	6	0
Athletic Bilbao B	1987–88	Segunda División	35	2	4	0	39	2
Athletic Bilbao B	1988–89	Segunda División B	36	1	–		36	1
Athletic Bilbao B	1989–90	Segunda División	19	0	0	0	19	0
Athletic Bilbao B	Total		95	3	5	0	100	3
Athletic Bilbao	1989–90	La Liga	17	0	0	0	17	0
Real Valladolid	1990–91	La Liga	2	0	0	0	2	0
Celta Vigo	1991–92	Segunda División	34	0	1	0	35	0
Celta Vigo	1992–93	La Liga	33	0	1	0	34	0
Celta Vigo	1993–94	La Liga	17	0	9	0	26	0
Celta Vigo	1994–95	La Liga	21	1	1	0	22	1
Celta Vigo	1995–96	La Liga	27	0	5	0	32	0
Celta Vigo	1996–97	La Liga	20	0	2	0	22	0
Celta Vigo	Total		152	1	19	0	171	1
Compostela	1997–98	La Liga	11	0	0	0	11	0
Compostela	1998–99	Segunda División	32	0	3	0	35	0
Compostela	Total		43	0	3	0	46	0
Leioa	2005–06	División de Honor de Vizcaya	?	?	–		?	?
Leioa	2006–07	División de Honor de Vizcaya	33	0	–		33	0
Leioa	Total		33	0	0	0	33	0
Career total			342	4	27	0	369	4
