= Alejo Indias =

Spanish footballer

Alejo
Personal information
- Full name: Alejo Indias Álvarez
- Date of birth: 14 October 1966 (age 60)
- Place of birth: Don Benito, Spain
- Height: 1.82 m (6 ft 0 in)
- Position: Centre back

Youth career
- –1984: Barcelona

Senior career*
Years	Team	Apps	(Gls)
1984–1989	Barcelona Atlètic	86	(8)
1985–1986	Barcelona Amateur	26	(2)
1989–1992	Figueres	118	(16)
1992–1997	Celta Vigo	158	(7)
1997–2001	Elche	100	(4)
- Sant Andreu de la Barca
Total		488	(37)

International career
- Catalonia

Managerial career
- Sant Andreu de la Barca
- * Club domestic league appearances and goals

Alejo Indias Álvarez (born 14 October 1966), known simply as Alejo, is a Spanish former footballer who played as a centre back.

Alejo began his career with Barcelona, but never made an appearance for the first team. He then became a member of the legendary Figueres team that almost earned promotion to La Liga in 1991–92, playing alongside players such as Toni, Luis Cembranos, Pere Gratacós, Tab Ramos and Tintín Márquez. He joined Celta Vigo in late 1992, and made 158 top flight appearances during four and a half seasons with the club, scoring seven goals. He also contested the 1994 Copa del Rey Final with Celta, which they lost to Real Zaragoza on penalties, with Alejo missing the crucial spot kick. Alejo saw out his career with four years at Elche in the second and third tiers.

== Club career ==
=== Early career ===
Alejo was born in Don Benito in the province of Badajoz, Extremadura, but his family soon relocated to Catalonia. He began his career in the lower categories of Catalan giants Barcelona, making his debut with the B team, Barcelona Atlètic, during the 1984–85 Segunda División season. He began to play more regularly the following season, featuring heavily for the C team, Barcelona Amateur, as they were relegated from Segunda División B. He spent the next three seasons in the second tier with Atlètic, but they were relegated at the end of 1988–89. He left Barcelona that summer without having made any appearances for the first team.

Alejo joined another Catalan club, Atlètic's erstwhile Segunda División rivals Figueres, ahead of the 1989–90 season. He made his Figueres debut in a 4–2 home win over Elche on 3 September 1989, and marked the occasion with a goal. He was a key part of the team for the next three seasons, and was part of the Figueres's greatest ever team in 1991–92. They finished the season in 3rd place, only one point short of automatic promotion to La Liga, and qualified for a promotion playoff.

They faced Cádiz in the playoff, but were defeated 3–1 on aggregate, the closest they have ever come to the top flight. Alejo continued to feature the following season, which ultimately ended in relegation, but he departed in December 1992. He left Figueres after 129 appearances and 18 goals in three and a half seasons.

=== Celta Vigo ===
He moved into the top flight by signing for Celta Vigo in December 1992. He made his La Liga debut on 20 December as Celta suffered a 1–0 home loss to Tenerife at Balaídos. He failed to score during his first season with Los Celestes, finally netting for the first time on 10 April 1994 in a 3–2 win over Real Sociedad at Balaídos. He made 40 appearances in his first full season, and was a key part of the side that reached the 1994 Copa del Rey Final. He is most remembered amongst Celta fans for the unfortunate part he played in the events of that final.

Celta faced Real Zaragoza in the final, which was held at Vicente Calderón Stadium in Madrid on 20 April 1994. After 120 minutes, the match was still goalless, and so penalties were required to separate the teams. The first four penalties for each side were successful, with Alejo taking Celta's fifth. He scuffed his kick, and the ball rolled tamely into the hands of Zaragoza goalkeeper Andoni Cedrún. Francisco Higuera then stepped up for Zaragoza and scored his penalty past Santiago Cañizares to bring an end to Celta's dreams. Alejo's plight drew sympathy from King Juan Carlos I when he met Celta coach Txetxu Rojo after the match.

The penalty incident didn't damage Alejo's Celta career, and he continued to be a crucial part of the side for the next three seasons. He eventually departed Celta in 1997 after 176 appearances and eight goals in four and a half years with Los Celestes.

=== Elche ===
Alejo joined Elche in the Segunda División in the summer of 1997. He made his debut for his new club on 3 September in a 0–0 home draw with Villarreal at Estadio Manuel Martínez Valero in the first round of the Copa del Rey. His first goal came on 12 November in a league fixture against the same opponents, which ended 1–1 at El Madrigal. Elche were relegated at the end of his first season, but were promoted again at the first attempt. Alejo made 114 appearances and scored four goals in four seasons with Elche, before retiring from professional football in 2001 at the age of 34.

== International career ==
Alejo played several friendly matches with the representative side of his adopted autonomous community, Catalonia.

== Coaching career ==
After retiring from the professional game, Alejo played at an amateur level for Sant Andreu de la Barca in the Regional Preferente de Catalonia. He later became the club's coach, and then worked as their youth coach.

== Personal life ==
Alejo's son Iago Indias, born in 1996, is a centre back for Castellón in the Segunda División, having begun his career with Espanyol. He made over 100 appearances for Espanyol B, but never played for the first team.

== Honours ==
Celta Vigo

- Copa del Rey runners-up: 1993–94

== Career statistics ==
As of 21 February 2021

Club	Season	League			Cup		Other		Total	
Club	Season	Division	Apps	Goals	Apps	Goals	Apps	Goals	Apps	Goals
Barcelona Atlètic	1984–85	Segunda División	1	0	0	0	0	0	1	0
Barcelona Atlètic	1986–87	Segunda División	14	2	0	0	–		14	2
Barcelona Atlètic	1987–88	Segunda División	37	5	6	0	–		43	5
Barcelona Atlètic	1988–89	Segunda División	34	1	6	0	–		40	1
Barcelona Atlètic	Total		86	8	12	0	0	0	98	8
Barcelona Amateur	1985–86	Segunda División B	26	2	–		–		26	2
Figueres	1989–90	Segunda División	34	7	2	1	–		36	8
Figueres	1990–91	Segunda División	37	4	2	0	–		39	4
Figueres	1991–92	Segunda División	34	3	3	0	2	0	39	3
Figueres	1992–93	Segunda División	13	2	2	1	–		15	3
Figueres	Total		118	16	9	2	2	0	129	18
Celta Vigo	1992–93	La Liga	21	0	0	0	–		21	0
Celta Vigo	1993–94	La Liga	34	2	6	0	–		40	2
Celta Vigo	1994–95	La Liga	35	1	3	0	–		38	1
Celta Vigo	1995–96	La Liga	40	2	5	1	–		45	3
Celta Vigo	1996–97	La Liga	28	2	4	0	–		32	2
Celta Vigo	Total		158	7	18	1	0	0	176	8
Elche	1997–98	Segunda División	34	2	4	0	–		38	2
Elche	1998–99	Segunda División B	33	1	4	0	6	0	43	1
Elche	1999–2000	Segunda División	27	1	0	0	–		27	1
Elche	2000–01	Segunda División	6	0	0	0	–		6	0
Elche	Total		100	4	8	0	6	0	114	4
Career total			488	37	47	3	8	0	543	40

1. Appearances in the 1991–92 Segunda División promotion playoff
2. Appearances in the 1999 Segunda División B playoffs
