= Vicente Álvarez (footballer, born 1960) =

Spanish footballer

Personal information
- Full name: Vicente Álvarez Núñez
- Date of birth: 30 April 1960 (age 66)
- Place of birth: Ourense, Spain
- Height: 1.78 m (5 ft 10 in)
- Position: Central midfielder

Youth career
- –1979: Ourense

Senior career*
Years	Team	Apps	(Gls)
1979–1980	Ourense	12	(1)
1980–1996	Celta Vigo	309	(13)
1982–1983	→ Racing de Ferrol (loan)	32	(1)
Total		353	(15)
- * Club domestic league appearances and goals

Vicente Álvarez Núñez (born 30 April 1960), sometimes known simply as Vicente, is a retired Spanish football player who played as a central midfielder. He spent almost his entire career with Celta Vigo, becoming club captain and an iconic figure during sixteen seasons at Balaídos. Eight of these seasons were in La Liga, during which Vicente amassed 194 top flight appearances and eight goals.

== Career ==
Álvarez was born in Ourense, capital of the province of the same name, in the autonomous community of Galicia, and began his career in the youth teams of CD Ourense. He was promoted to the first team for the 1979–80 Segunda División B campaign, and quickly drew the attention of scouts from Galician giants Celta Vigo. Not yet 20 years old, he joined Celta in February 1980. Segunda División regulations at the time required teams to start each match with two players aged 20 or younger, who could be substituted after 15 minutes. Álvarez was one of the players to benefit from this rule, which led to him starting 14 matches that season, but not playing the full 90 minutes in any of them. It was a disastrous season for Los Celestes, who were relegated to the third tier.

Álvarez didn't feature in either of the next two seasons, in part due to completing his military service in October 1981. He spent the 1982–83 season on loan at Racing de Ferrol in Segunda División B, before finally making his return to the Celta first team the following year. He played 21 matches that season, and 22 in 1984–85 as Los Celestes earned promotion to La Liga. He made his top flight debut on 6 October 1985 at Balaídos, coming on as a second half substitute for Nino Lema as Celta suffered a 2–1 home defeat at the hands of Real Zaragoza. He then went on to score his first top division goal on 19 October, after replacing Fernando Arteaga at half time in a home match against Osasuna. He picked up the rebound after Baltazar's free kick hit the post, and scored Celta's second in a 2–0 victory.

Celta were relegated at the end of that season, a fate they suffered again in 1989–90, but there were also good times, with promotion straight back to the top flight in 1986–87, and as Segunda División champions in 1991–92. During this period, Álvarez established himself as a legend of the club, able to excel in any area of the pitch. His versatility led to comparisons with another giant of the club's history, Quique Costas. However, he also suffered with a series of injuries, in particular missing almost all of the 1990–91 season.

By the time Celta started an extended period in the top flight in 1992, Álvarez was established as club captain. Having experienced some of the club's darkest days, including relegation to Segunda División B, he also got to be there for one of its brightest, captaining the team in the 1994 Copa del Rey Final. Celta held Real Zaragoza at bay for 120 minutes, but were denied a fairytale victory when Alejo's penalty was saved by Andoni Cedrún, handing Zaragoza the trophy.

Álvarez continued to play for Celta for another two seasons, although his appearances were limited by injury. His swansong came on 25 May 1996, in the final match of the 1995–96 season. He replaced Ángel Merino in the second half against Valencia at Balaídos, in a match which ended 1–1. Álvarez, along with José Gil who was also departing after a long and successful time at Celta, received a standing ovation from the appreciative crowd. The following year, Celta played a testimonial for Álvarez against Tenerife at Balaídos, where he was honoured by club president Horacio Gómez.

== Honours ==
Celta Vigo

- Segunda División: 1991–92
- Copa del Rey runners-up: 1993–94

== Career statistics ==
As of 6 March 2021

Club	Season	League			Cup		Other		Total	
Club	Season	Division	Apps	Goals	Apps	Goals	Apps	Goals	Apps	Goals
Ourense	1979–80	Segunda División B	12	1	3	0	–		15	1
Celta Vigo	1979–80	Segunda División	14	0	0	0	–		14	0
Celta Vigo	1983–84	Segunda División	19	0	0	0	2	0	21	0
Celta Vigo	1984–85	Segunda División	16	0	5	1	1	0	22	1
Celta Vigo	1985–86	La Liga	23	2	8	0	2	0	33	2
Celta Vigo	1986–87	Segunda División	38	3	3	0	–		41	3
Celta Vigo	1987–88	La Liga	33	1	6	0	–		39	1
Celta Vigo	1988–89	La Liga	33	3	5	0	–		38	3
Celta Vigo	1989–90	La Liga	28	0	4	0	–		32	0
Celta Vigo	1990–91	Segunda División	3	0	0	0	–		3	0
Celta Vigo	1991–92	Segunda División	25	2	0	0	–		25	2
Celta Vigo	1992–93	La Liga	36	2	0	0	–		36	2
Celta Vigo	1993–94	La Liga	11	0	1	0	–		12	0
Celta Vigo	1994–95	La Liga	10	0	2	0	–		12	0
Celta Vigo	1995–96	La Liga	20	0	3	0	–		23	0
Celta Vigo	Total		309	13	37	1	5	0	351	14
Racing de Ferrol	1982–83	Segunda División B	32	1	–		2	0	34	1
Career total			353	15	40	1	7	0	400	16

1. Appearances in the 1984 Copa de la Liga Segunda División
2. Appearance in the 1985 Copa de la Liga Segunda División
3. Appearances in the 1986 Copa de la Liga
4. Appearances in the 1983 Copa de la Liga Segunda División B
