= Sestao Sport Club =

Sestao Sport
- Full name: Sestao Sport Club
- Founded: 1916; 110 years ago
- Dissolved: 1996; 30 years ago
- Ground: Las Llanas, Sestao, Basque Country, Spain
- Capacity: 4,367
- 1995–96: Segunda División, 17th of 20
Home colours	Away colours

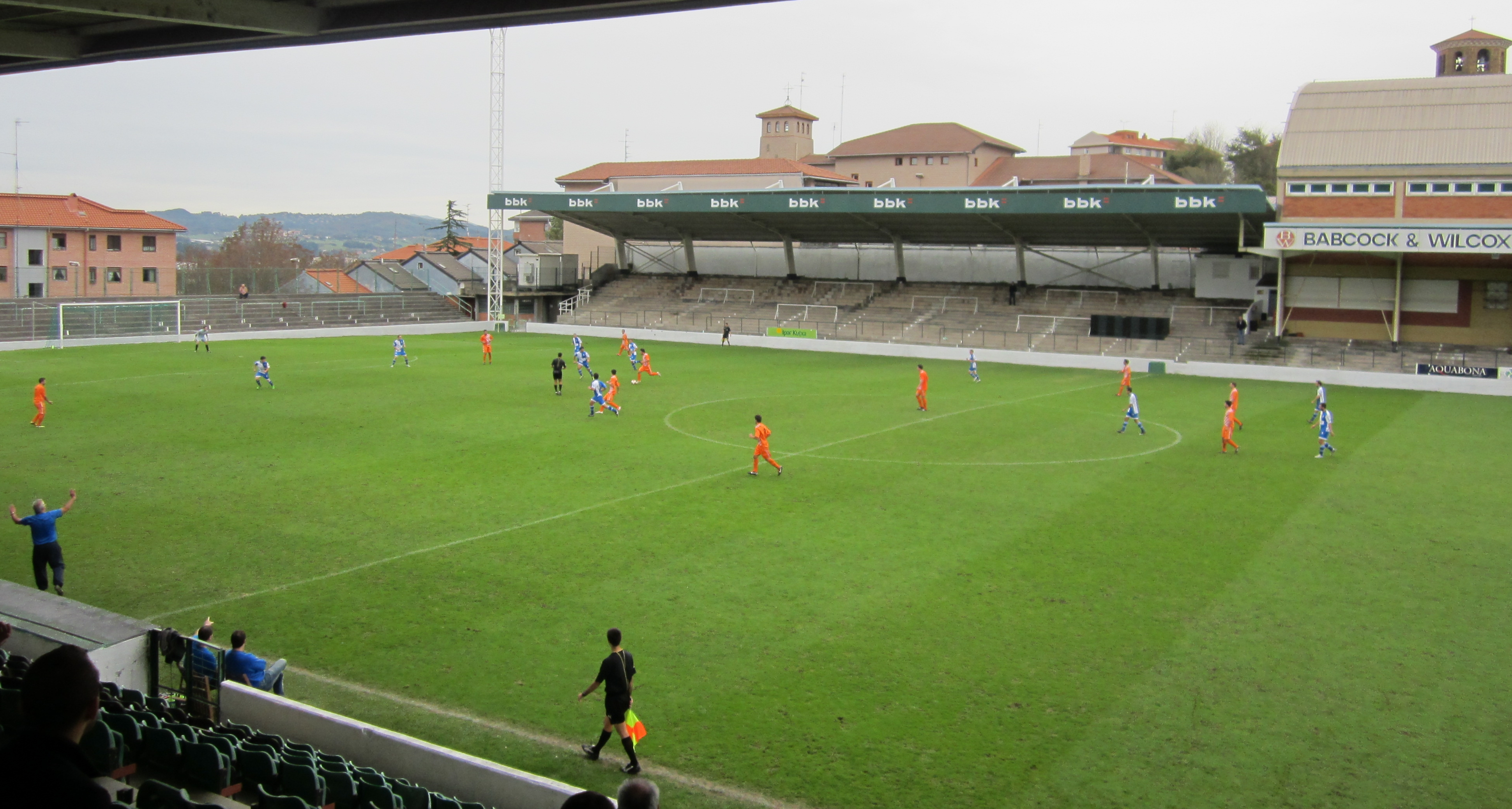
Las Llanas, the former stadium of the club.

Sestao Sport Club was a Spanish football club based in Sestao, in the autonomous community of Basque Country. Founded in 1916 it held home matches at Campo Municipal de las Llanas, with a capacity of 8,900 seats.

== History ==
Sestao managed to play 17 seasons in Segunda División, first staying seven seasons from 1954 but before the creation of Segunda División B, then from 1985 to 1993.

After the 1995–96 campaign, its final in level two, Sestao, which had been relegated through play, suffered another drop off, and folded due to unsurmountable economic problems. Following its demise, Sestao River Club was founded.

== Season to season ==
Season	Tier	Division	Place	Copa del Rey
1928–29	5	2ª Reg. P.	1st	
1929–30	3	3ª	5th	
1930–31	3	3ª	5th	
1931–32	5	2ª Reg. P.	1st	
1932–33	5	2ª Reg. P.	5th	
1933–34	5	2ª Reg. P.	1st	
1934–35	4	1ª Reg.	3rd	
1935–36	4	1ª Reg.	4th	
1939–40	2	2ª	5th	
1940–41	3	3ª	2nd	
1941–42	3	1ª Reg. A	3rd	
1942–43	3	1ª Reg. A	1st	
1943–44	3	3ª	5th	Third round
1944–45	3	3ª	6th	
1945–46	3	3ª	2nd	
1946–47	3	3ª	9th	
1947–48	3	3ª	6th	Second round
1948–49	3	3ª	7th	First round
1949–50	3	3ª	7th	
1950–51	3	3ª	9th	

Season	Tier	Division	Place	Copa del Rey
1951–52	3	3ª	10th	
1952–53	3	3ª	2nd	
1953–54	3	3ª	1st	
1954–55	2	2ª	14th	
1955–56	2	2ª	15th	
1956–57	2	2ª	14th	
1957–58	2	2ª	10th	
1958–59	2	2ª	8th	First round
1959–60	2	2ª	14th	First round
1960–61	2	2ª	14th	Round of 32
1961–62	3	3ª	5th	
1962–63	3	3ª	5th	
1963–64	3	3ª	6th	
1964–65	3	3ª	2nd	
1965–66	3	3ª	4th	
1966–67	3	3ª	2nd	
1967–68	3	3ª	5th	
1968–69	3	3ª	6th	
1969–70	3	3ª	3rd	Fourth round
1970–71	3	3ª	3rd	Second round

Season	Tier	Division	Place	Copa del Rey
1971–72	3	3ª	2nd	Fourth round
1972–73	3	3ª	6th	Third round
1973–74	3	3ª	6th	First round
1974–75	3	3ª	6th	First round
1975–76	3	3ª	3rd	First round
1976–77	3	3ª	5th	Second round
1977–78	3	2ª B	17th	First round
1978–79	3	2ª B	12th	Second round
1979–80	3	2ª B	7th	First round
1980–81	3	2ª B	10th	Second round
1981–82	3	2ª B	4th	First round
1982–83	3	2ª B	4th	Second round
1983–84	3	2ª B	6th	First round

Season	Tier	Division	Place	Copa del Rey
1984–85	3	2ª B	1st	Fourth round
1985–86	2	2ª	10th	First round
1986–87	2	2ª	6th	Second round
1987–88	2	2ª	10th	Round of 32
1988–89	2	2ª	8th	Round of 32
1989–90	2	2ª	11th	Second round
1990–91	2	2ª	8th	Third round
1991–92	2	2ª	17th	Fourth round
1992–93	2	2ª	19th	Third round
1993–94	3	2ª B	2nd	Second round
1994–95	3	2ª B	3rd	Fourth round
1995–96	2	2ª	17th	First round

- 17 seasons in Segunda División
- 10 seasons in Segunda División B
- 30 seasons in Tercera División
