= Emilio López (Spanish footballer) =

Spanish footballer

Personal information
- Full name: Emilio Manuel López Fernández
- Date of birth: 9 July 1965 (age 61)
- Place of birth: Vigo, Spain
- Height: 1.77 m (5 ft 9 1/2 in)

Youth career
- Celta

Senior career*
Years	Team	Apps	(Gls)
1987–1989	Gran Peña		
1988–1989	→ Arosa (loan)		
1989–1993	Celta	0	(0)
1993–1994	Figueres	37	(0)
1994–1995	Badajoz	15	(0)
1995–1996	Leganés	38	(0)
1996–1999	Badajoz	117	(0)
1999–2000	Osasuna	19	(0)
2000–2001	Jaén	28	(0)
2001–2003	Hércules	30	(0)
Total		247	(0)
- * Club domestic league appearances and goals

Emilio Manuel López Fernández (born 9 July 1965), simply known as Emilio López, is a Spanish retired footballer who played as a goalkeeper, and a current coach.

== Playing career ==
Born in Vigo, Galicia, Emilio was a Celta de Vigo youth graduate. After representing Gran Peña FC (the reserve team) and Arosa SC, he was promoted to the former's main squad in La Liga in 1989.

Emilio was subsequently third-choice during his four seasons at the club, and signed for UE Figueres in 1993 without making a single appearance. After appearing regularly he moved to Segunda División's CD Badajoz in the 1994 summer, and made his debut in the competition on 27 November 1994 by starting in a 1–0 home win against RCD Mallorca.

In 1995 Emilio joined CD Leganés, also in the second level. After being an everpresent fixture in his first and only campaign he returned to Badajoz, winning the Ricardo Zamora Trophy in 1997.

In June 1999, Emilio moved to CA Osasuna. After achieving promotion to the top division he signed with Real Jaén, also in the second division.

Emilio retired with Hércules CF in 2003, aged 37.

== Post-playing career ==
Shortly after his retirement Emilio returned to his first club Celta, being appointed goalkeeper coach. In 2012, he joined Getafe CF B in the same role, and was promoted to the main squad in March 2014 after the arrival of Cosmin Contra.
