= Mikel Antía =

Spanish footballer

Personal information
- Full name: Mikel Antía Mendiaraz
- Date of birth: 13 February 1973 (age 53)
- Place of birth: San Sebastián, Spain
- Height: 1.88 m (6 ft 2 in)
- Position: Centre back

Youth career
- Real Madrid

Senior career*
Years	Team	Apps	(Gls)
1992–1994	Real Madrid B	73	(0)
1994–1995	Celta	0	(0)
1995–1997	Valladolid	56	(0)
1997–2001	Real Sociedad	46	(2)
2001	Numancia	19	(0)
2001–2002	Elche	13	(0)
2002–2003	Braga	16	(1)
2003–2004	Ponferradina	34	(2)
2004–2006	Real Unión	54	(1)
Total		311	(6)

Managerial career
- 2011: Almería (assistant)
- 2011–2012: Real Unión (assistant)
- 2012–2016: Aspire Academy
- 2016–2018: Newcastle United (assistant)
- 2018–2020: Dalian Pro (assistant)
- 2022: Charlotte FC (assistant)
- 2023: Leeds United (assistant)
- * Club domestic league appearances and goals

Mikel Antía Mendiaraz (born 13 February 1973) is a Spanish football coach and former player who played as a central defender.

He played 121 La Liga games for Real Valladolid, Real Sociedad and Numancia, and also spent one season in Portugal's Primeira Liga for Braga. He was later assistant manager for several clubs.

== Playing career ==
Born in San Sebastián, Antía was a youth and reserve team player at Real Madrid. He played his only match for the first team on 25 May 1994 in the second leg of the Copa Iberoamericana away to Boca Juniors at La Bombonera, a 2–1 loss but 4–3 aggregate win.

Antía played the second half of the 2000–01 season at Numancia, who were relegated from La Liga. After a trial in England at Preston North End, he signed for Elche in the Segunda División. After a year in Portugal's Primeira Liga with Braga, he signed in July 2003 for Ponferradina in the Segunda División B.

== Coaching career ==
Antía began his coaching career in April 2011 as assistant to former Real Sociedad teammate Roberto Olabe at UD Almería, who ended the season relegated from La Liga. Two months later, they joined Real Unión in their native Gipuzkoa and the third-tier Segunda División B.

For four years from 2012, Antía coached at the Aspire Academy in Qatar. In June 2016, he was hired as Rafael Benítez's assistant at Newcastle United in the EFL Championship; Benítez had coached him in Real Madrid's academy. In 2019, he followed Benítez to Dalian Professional in China.

In July 2021, Antía was signed as assistant to Christian Lattanzio at Charlotte FC in Major League Soccer. He joined on a three-year deal. He departed in February 2023 to join Leeds United as assistant to compatriot Javi Gracia. Gracia and his entire staff were sacked in May with four games remaining of the Premier League season.
