= Sebastián Losada =

Spanish footballer

Personal information
- Full name: Sebastián Losada Bestard
- Date of birth: 3 September 1967 (age 59)
- Place of birth: Madrid, Spain
- Height: 1.83 m (6 ft 0 in)
- Position: Striker

Youth career
- 1980–1985: Real Madrid

Senior career*
Years	Team	Apps	(Gls)
1984–1987	Real Madrid B	64	(18)
1984–1991	Real Madrid	38	(13)
1987–1988	→ Español (loan)	28	(8)
1991–1992	Atlético Madrid	9	(1)
1992–1993	Sevilla	3	(0)
1993–1995	Celta	53	(12)
Total		195	(52)

International career
1983	Spain U16	5	(3)
1984–1986	Spain U18	10	(5)
1985	Spain U19	1	(0)
1985	Spain U20	5	(3)
1988–1990	Spain U21	7	(1)
1995	Spain	1	(0)
- * Club domestic league appearances and goals

Sebastián Losada Bestard (born 3 September 1967) is a Spanish former professional footballer who played as a striker.

He amassed La Liga totals of 131 matches and 34 goals over nine seasons in representation of five teams, starting his career with Real Madrid.

== Club career ==
A Real Madrid youth graduate, Madrid-born Losada made his first-team debut on 9 September 1984 in a 1–1 away draw against Sporting de Gijón, but would not have a successful period with the capital side. He did, however, score eight La Liga goals in just 16 appearances in the 1989–90 season as Real were crowned champions, adding the club's goal number 400 in the European Cup in a 2–2 draw at FC Swarovski Tirol on 7 November 1990.

In 1987–88, Losada served a loan stint with RCD Español and netted eight top-division goals during the campaign, also helping the team to reach the UEFA Cup final: he scored twice in the first leg for the Catalans (3–0), but missed his penalty shootout attempt in the eventual loss against Bayer 04 Leverkusen.

Subsequently, Losada played for Atlético Madrid (frequently feuding with club president Jesús Gil), Sevilla FC – where he coincided with Diego Maradona– and RC Celta de Vigo.

== International career ==
Losada earned his only cap for the Spain national team on 18 January 1995, playing the second half of a 2–2 friendly draw with Uruguay in A Coruña. He also appeared for the under-20s at the 1985 FIFA World Youth Championship, scoring three goals in five matches for the runners-up.

== Post-retirement ==
Losada became a lawyer after retiring at only 27. In 2004, he unsuccessfully ran for president of the Royal Spanish Football Federation.

== Honours ==
Real Madrid

- La Liga: 1988–89, 1989–90
- Copa del Rey: 1988–89
- Supercopa de España: 1990

Español

- UEFA Cup runner-up: 1987–88

Spain U20

- FIFA U-20 World Cup runner-up: 1985

Individual

- FIFA U-20 World Cup Golden Shoe: 1985
