= José María García-Aranda =

Spanish football referee

- Full name: José María García-Aranda Encinar
- Born: 3 March 1956 (age 70); Madrid, Spain
- Other occupation: Physical education teacher

Domestic
Years	League	Role
1989–2001	La Liga	Referee

International
Years	League	Role
1993–2001	FIFA-listed	Referee

José María García-Aranda Encinar (born 3 March 1956) is a Spanish retired football referee, who officiated in three matches during the 1998 FIFA World Cup in France. He also refereed two matches at UEFA Euro 2000 in Belgium and the Netherlands.

He lives in Switzerland, where he works for the FIFA, the International Football Association, as the Head of Refereeing.
