= Milorad Ratković =

Bosnian-Herzegovinian footballer

Personal information
- Full name: Milorad Ratković
- Date of birth: October 15, 1964 (age 62)
- Place of birth: Zenica, SFR Yugoslavia
- Height: 1.83 m (6 ft 0 in)
- Position: Left midfielder

Senior career*
Years	Team	Apps	(Gls)
1983–1990	Čelik Zenica	112	(6)
1990–1992	Red Star Belgrade	27	(4)
1991	→ Borac Banja Luka (loan)	17	(8)
1992–1998	Celta de Vigo	134	(15)
1998–1999	Sevilla	11	(0)
- * Club domestic league appearances and goals

Milorad Ratković (Serbian Cyrillic: Милорад Paткoвић; born 15 October 1964 in Zenica) is a Bosnian-Herzegovinian former football player who played as a Left midfielder.

== Club career ==
During his successful playing career he played for the Yugoslav clubs NK Čelik Zenica, Red Star Belgrade, FK Borac Banja Luka and Spanish sides Celta de Vigo and Sevilla FC. He played 134 games in six years with Celta and won a runner-up medal in the 1994 Copa del Rey when he played alongside compatriot Vladimir Gudelj and Spanish international goalkeeper Santiago Cañizares.

== Post-playing career ==
As of 2020, he works as a scout for Celta.
