= 1987–88 Segunda División =

57th season of the second-tier football league in Spain

Segunda División
- Season: 1987–88
- Champions: CD Málaga
- Promoted: CD Málaga; Elche CF; Real Oviedo
- Relegated: Bilbao Athletic; Hércules CF; Granada CF; Cartagena FC
- Matches: 380
- Goals: 952 (2.51 per match)
- Top goalscorer: (Spain) Carlos

The 1987–88 Segunda División season saw 20 teams participate in the second flight Spanish league. CD Málaga won the league.

CD Málaga, Elche CF and Real Oviedo were promoted to Primera División. Bilbao Athletic, Hércules CF, Granada CF and Cartagena FC were relegated to Segunda División B.

This season, the league was expanded to 20 teams and the promotion playoff (promoción) returned.

== Teams ==
Location of teams in Segunda División 1987-88
Canary Islands

Team	Home city	Stadium
Barcelona Atlètic	Barcelona	Mini Estadi
Bilbao Athletic	Bilbao	San Mamés
Real Burgos CF	Burgos	El Plantío
Cartagena FC	Cartagena	El Almarjal
CD Castellón	Castellón de la Plana	Castàlia
Castilla CF	Madrid	Ciudad Deportiva
Deportivo La Coruña	A Coruña	Riazor
Elche CF	Elche	Nuevo Estadio
UE Figueres	Figueres	Vilatenim
Granada CF	Granada	Los Cármenes
Hércules CF	Alicante	José Rico Pérez
UE Lleida	Lleida	Camp d'Esports
CD Málaga	Málaga	La Rosaleda
Real Oviedo	Oviedo	Carlos Tartiere
Racing de Santander	Santander	El Sardinero
Rayo Vallecano	Madrid	Vallecas
Recreativo de Huelva	Huelva	Colombino
Sestao Sport	Sestao	Las Llanas
CD Tenerife	Santa Cruz de Tenerife	Heliodoro Rodríguez López
Xerez CD	Jerez de la Frontera	Domecq

== Final table ==
Pos	Team	Pld	W	D	L	GF	GA	GD	Pts	Promotion or relegation
1	CD Málaga	38	22	10	6	74	39	+35	54	Promoted to Primera División
2	Elche CF	38	21	8	9	62	34	+28	50	Promoted to Primera División
3	Castilla CF (Note: Castilla CF was ineligible for promotion for being reserve team of Real Madrid.)	38	18	12	8	58	42	+16	48	
4	Real Oviedo	38	19	7	12	58	37	+21	45	Promotion playoff
5	Rayo Vallecano	38	18	9	11	58	47	+11	45	Promotion playoff
6	UE Lleida	38	15	12	11	53	37	+16	42	
7	UE Figueres	38	14	14	10	44	36	+8	42	
8	Barcelona Atlètic	38	14	13	11	52	47	+5	41	
9	Xerez CD	38	17	7	14	49	37	+12	41	
10	Sestao	38	15	7	16	42	45	−3	37	
11	CD Castellón	38	12	13	13	34	45	−11	37	
12	CD Tenerife	38	13	10	15	48	57	−9	36	
13	Real Burgos	38	11	12	15	34	50	−16	34	
14	Racing de Santander	38	11	11	16	35	47	−12	33	
15	Recreativo de Huelva	38	12	9	17	55	71	−16	33	
16	Deportivo de La Coruña	38	8	15	15	35	47	−12	31	
17	Bilbao Athletic	38	11	9	18	44	53	−9	31	Relegated to Segunda División B
18	Hércules CF	38	10	9	19	46	56	−10	29	Relegated to Segunda División B
19	Granada CF	38	8	11	19	36	46	−10	27	Relegated to Segunda División B
20	Cartagena FC	38	8	8	22	35	79	−44	24	Relegated to Segunda División B

Source: BDFutbol

== Results ==
Home \ Away	BAR	BIL	BUR	CAR	CAS	CST	DEP	ELC	FIG	GRA	HÉR	LLE	MGA	OVI	RAC	RAY	REC	SES	TEN	XER
Barcelona At.	—	2–1	2–2	3–0	2–0	2–3	2–2	1–3	1–0	1–1	1–1	0–1	1–1	1–0	3–1	1–0	4–2	4–1	1–1	2–2
Bilbao Ath.	1–2	—	2–0	3–0	0–0	1–2	1–1	1–2	1–1	0–1	2–1	2–1	1–1	2–0	5–0	0–1	2–1	2–2	3–0	1–2
Real Burgos	1–1	1–2	—	1–1	1–0	3–2	1–1	0–0	1–1	1–0	1–0	1–1	0–1	0–1	1–1	0–0	3–1	0–1	2–1	1–0
Cartagena	0–0	0–1	0–0	—	4–0	3–3	0–1	2–1	0–1	3–1	3–3	1–1	0–3	1–0	4–1	1–2	1–0	2–3	0–1	2–1
Castellón	1–1	2–1	0–1	5–0	—	0–0	2–1	2–2	3–1	1–1	1–0	2–1	0–0	1–0	0–0	1–0	2–0	1–0	1–1	0–2
Castilla	1–2	1–0	2–2	1–1	4–0	—	2–1	1–2	0–0	2–1	2–1	1–0	1–3	0–0	0–1	1–2	5–1	1–0	4–2	0–0
Deportivo	1–0	1–0	0–1	1–1	0–1	0–0	—	1–1	2–1	0–0	1–0	1–1	2–2	2–2	1–0	1–0	1–2	0–1	3–0	0–0
Elche	3–0	2–0	4–1	3–0	2–0	1–0	0–0	—	1–1	1–0	3–1	0–1	0–1	1–0	1–1	5–1	2–0	1–0	1–0	3–0
Figueres	0–0	1–0	2–1	6–2	0–0	1–1	2–1	1–1	—	1–0	3–0	1–2	1–0	2–2	2–0	1–1	1–0	3–0	2–1	1–1
Granada	2–0	1–1	0–1	0–2	0–0	1–2	5–0	0–1	0–2	—	0–0	0–1	1–1	2–4	3–0	0–1	2–3	2–0	1–0	1–0
Hércules	2–0	5–1	3–1	2–0	1–2	1–3	1–0	4–1	4–2	1–1	—	1–0	0–1	1–0	3–0	1–1	1–3	1–2	0–0	0–2
Lleida	1–0	2–0	4–0	7–0	4–0	1–2	2–2	0–2	3–0	1–1	2–2	—	1–2	1–0	0–0	1–1	2–0	3–1	2–0	0–0
Málaga	4–1	5–1	5–0	4–0	4–3	1–2	3–1	3–1	1–0	1–0	3–0	1–1	—	2–2	3–1	1–3	1–2	3–1	1–2	1–0
R. Oviedo	1–3	2–2	1–0	3–0	2–0	0–1	1–1	1–0	1–0	3–1	4–0	3–0	3–3	—	1–0	3–0	5–2	0–1	3–0	1–0
Racing	2–0	2–0	1–2	2–0	1–1	0–1	1–0	1–1	0–0	0–0	2–0	1–1	0–2	4–1	—	3–1	2–2	2–0	1–0	0–2
Rayo	2–1	0–0	2–1	3–1	1–1	3–3	2–1	3–2	3–1	1–2	2–1	1–0	4–1	1–2	1–0	—	5–1	1–1	2–2	4–1
Recreativo	2–2	2–2	1–1	3–0	1–1	1–4	4–1	1–4	1–0	3–2	1–0	1–1	1–1	1–0	1–1	2–0	—	2–3	2–3	3–1
Sestao Sport	1–1	1–2	2–0	4–0	4–0	0–0	1–0	2–0	0–0	1–0	0–0	3–1	0–0	0–2	0–1	2–0	2–1	—	1–2	0–1
Tenerife	0–2	3–0	2–1	2–0	1–0	0–0	2–2	1–4	1–1	3–3	2–2	3–0	1–2	1–3	2–1	1–0	3–1	2–1	—	1–1
Xerez	0–2	2–0	2–0	3–0	4–0	1–0	2–1	2–0	0–1	3–0	3–2	1–2	1–2	0–1	2–1	0–3	0–0	4–0	3–1	—

Source: BDFutbol
Legend: Blue = home team win; Yellow = draw; Red = away team win.

== Promotion playoff ==
Team 1	Agg.	Team 2	1st leg	2nd leg
Real Oviedo	2–1	RCD Mallorca	2–1	0–0
Real Murcia	4–1	Rayo Vallecano	3–0	1–1

=== First leg ===
29 May 1988	Real Oviedo	2–1	RCD Mallorca	Oviedo
	Julià 78'; Carlos 90+'	Report (in Spanish)	García Cortés 89' (pen.)	Stadium: Carlos Tartiere; Attendance: 22,000; Referee: José María Enríquez Negreira (Catalonia)

29 May 1988	Real Murcia	3–0	Rayo Vallecano	Murcia
	Mejías 20'; Juanjo 59'; Manolo 86'	Report (in Spanish)		Stadium: La Condomina; Attendance: 16,500; Referee: José Donato Pes Pérez (Aragon)

=== Second leg ===
4 June 1988	RCD Mallorca	0–0 (1–2 agg.)	Real Oviedo	Palma de Mallorca
20:00		Report (in Spanish)		Stadium: Lluis Sitjar; Attendance: 25,000; Referee: Victoriano Sánchez Arminio (Cantabria)

5 June 1988	Rayo Vallecano	1–1 (1–4 agg.)	Real Murcia	Madrid
	Brown 55' (o.g.)	Report (in Spanish)	Cordero 90'	Stadium: Vallecas; Attendance: 15,000; Referee: Ildefonso Urizar Azpitarte (Basque Country (autonomous community))

== Pichichi Trophy for Top Goalscorers ==
Goalscorers	Goals	Team
(Spain) Carlos Muñoz	25	Real Oviedo
(Spain) Paquito Sánchez	22	CD Málaga
(Spain) Sixto Casabona	20	Elche CF
