= Txetxu Rojo =

Spanish footballer and coach (1947–2022)

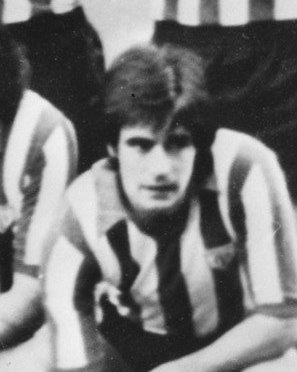
- Rojo in 1977

Personal information
- Full name: José Francisco Rojo Arroitia
- Date of birth: 28 January 1947
- Place of birth: Bilbao, Spain
- Date of death: 23 December 2022 (aged 75)
- Place of death: Leioa, Spain
- Height: 1.76 m (5 ft 9 in)
- Position: Forward

Youth career
- Athletic Bilbao

Senior career*
Years	Team	Apps	(Gls)
1965	Bilbao Athletic	3	(5)
1965–1982	Athletic Bilbao	414	(47)
Total		417	(52)

International career
1965	Spain U18	1	(1)
1969–1970	Spain U23	3	(0)
1969–1978	Spain	18	(3)

Managerial career
- 1986–1989: Bilbao Athletic
- 1989–1990: Athletic Bilbao
- 1990–1994: Celta
- 1994: Osasuna
- 1995–1997: Lleida
- 1997–1998: Salamanca
- 1998–2000: Zaragoza
- 2000–2001: Athletic Bilbao
- 2001–2002: Zaragoza
- 2004: Rayo Vallecano
- * Club domestic league appearances and goals

José Francisco 'Txetxu' Rojo Arroitia (28 January 1947 – 23 December 2022), also known as Rojo I, was a Spanish football player and manager.

During his career, the forward played solely for Athletic Bilbao, in a professional spell which spanned nearly 20 years. He was one of the club's most iconic players, and later also worked as a coach with the team.

Rojo won 18 caps for Spain.

== Club career ==
Born in Bilbao, Biscay, Rojo joined local giants Athletic Bilbao's youth academy at an early age. In 1965, he started playing for the reserves but, after only three appearances, was promoted to the first team, and stayed there until his professional retirement 17 years later.

Rojo made his La Liga debut on 26 September 1965 in a 1–0 away loss against Córdoba, and helped Athletic to win Copa del Rey trophies in 1969 and 1973. He totalled 414 games in the Spanish top flight, becoming the player with the second-most appearances in the Basque club's history, only behind José Ángel Iribar. The total was eventually surpassed by Iker Muniain in 2023 and Óscar de Marcos a year later, though both played far fewer minutes than Rojo overall.

For several seasons, Rojo shared teams with his younger brother José Ángel, with the pair being thus referred to as 'Rojo I' and 'Rojo II'.

== International career ==
Rojo played 18 times for Spain, his debut coming on 26 March 1969 in a friendly against Switzerland held in Valencia. He scored three goals in his nine years with the national team, but never took part in any major international tournament; he and his brother José Ángel appeared together in an exhibition game with Turkey on 17 October 1973, in the latter's sole cap.

== Coaching career ==
In 1982, aged 35, Rojo retired as a footballer and began a coaching career – a testimonial match was held in his honour, with Athletic Bilbao hosting the England national team. His first managerial experience would be with the former's reserves, and he was promoted to first-team duties early into the 1989–90 campaign, being dismissed at its conclusion.

After a four-year spell at Celta de Vigo, achieving promotion to the top flight in his second season as champions, and also leading the side to the domestic cup final in 1994, Rojo returned to Segunda División and stayed there the next three seasons, in charge of Osasuna and Lleida. For 1997–98 he was appointed at Salamanca, helping the modest club to retain its first-division status, and the following season he joined Real Zaragoza, leading them to fourth position in 2000 but failing to qualify for the UEFA Champions League because of a controversial decision to instead award their place to Real Madrid, winners of the continental tournament.

Rojo returned to the San Mamés Stadium for 2000–01, but moved back to Zaragoza the following campaign, being replaced by Luis Costa on 22 January 2002 after a 4–2 away loss against Sevilla, and ultimately being relegated from the top tier. He then took a sabbatical year, subsequently joining Rayo Vallecano in division two and again dropping down a league.

== Personal life and death ==
Rojo died on 23 December 2022 at the age of 75, in Leioa. Athletic Bilbao released the following statement upon his death:

"There are not enough words in the world to describe Txetxu Rojo and what he means for our Club. Those who enjoyed his unique style on the left wing for 17 seasons will remember the amazing runs, the surgical and unexpected passes, exquisite controls, beautiful goals, but, above all, the aura of an inimitable footballer, an artist, a creator of beauty, perhaps lacking in the brawn of other Athletic legends, but nonetheless possessing the enormous heart of a Lion. Although Txetxu's heart has stopped beating in his mortal body, it will continue to beat forever in the hearts of our fans."

Rojo was given the nickname the "Mozart of football" by composer Carmelo Bernaola.

== Career statistics ==
Scores and results list Spain's goal tally first, score column indicates score after each Rojo goal.

List of international goals scored by Txetxu Rojo
No.	Date	Venue	Opponent	Score	Result	Competition
1	22 April 1970	La Pontaise, Lausanne, Switzerland	Switzerland	1–0	1–0	Friendly
2	24 November 1971	Los Cármenes, Granada, Spain	Cyprus	7–0	7–0	Euro 1972 qualifying
3	16 February 1972	Boothferry Park, Hull, England	Northern Ireland	1–0	1–1	Euro 1972 qualifying

== Honours ==
=== Player ===
Athletic Bilbao

- Copa del Generalísimo: 1969, 1972–73; runner-up: 1965–66, 1966–67, 1976–77
- UEFA Cup: runner-up 1976–77

=== Manager ===
Celta

- Segunda División: 1991–92
- Copa del Rey runner-up: 1993–94

== See also ==
- List of Athletic Bilbao players (+200 appearances)
- List of La Liga players (400+ appearances)
- List of one-club men in association football
