= 1989–90 Segunda División =

59th season of the second-tier football league in Spain

Segunda División
- Season: 1989–90
- Champions: Real Burgos CF
- Promoted: Real Burgos CF; Real Betis; RCD Español
- Relegated: Racing de Santander; Castilla CF; Recreativo de Huelva; Atlético Madrileño
- Matches: 380
- Goals: 770 (2.03 per match)
- Top goalscorer: (Spain) Pepe Mel

The 1989–90 Segunda División season saw 20 teams participate in the second flight Spanish league. Real Burgos CF won the league.

Real Burgos, Real Betis and RCD Español were promoted to Primera División. Racing de Santander, Castilla CF, Recreativo de Huelva and Atlético Madrileño were relegated to Segunda División B.

== Teams ==
Location of teams in Segunda División 1989-90
Canary Islands

Team	Home city	Stadium
Atlético Madrileño	Madrid	Vicente Calderón
Betis	Seville	Benito Villamarín
Bilbao Athletic	Bilbao	San Mamés
Real Burgos	Burgos	El Plantío
Castilla	Madrid	Ciudad Deportiva
Deportivo La Coruña	A Coruña	Riazor
Eibar	Eibar	Ipurua
Elche	Elche	Manuel Martínez Valero
Español	Barcelona	Sarrià
Figueres	Figueres	Vilatenim
Las Palmas	Las Palmas	Insular
Levante	Valencia	Nou Estadi
Murcia	Murcia	La Condomina
Palamós	Palamós	Nou Municipal
Racing de Santander	Santander	El Sardinero
Recreativo de Huelva	Huelva	Colombino
Sabadell	Sabadell	Nova Creu Alta
Salamanca	Villares de la Reina	Helmántico
Sestao Sport	Sestao	Las Llanas
Xerez	Jerez de la Frontera	Chapín

== Final table ==
Pos	Team	Pld	W	D	L	GF	GA	GD	Pts	Promotion or relegation
1	Real Burgos	38	18	14	6	53	24	+29	50	Promoted to Primera División
2	Real Betis	38	16	15	7	44	29	+15	47	Promoted to Primera División
3	Bilbao Athletic (Note: Bilbao Athletic was ineligible for promotion for being reserve team of Athletic de Bilbao.)	38	15	15	8	50	36	+14	45	
4	Deportivo de La Coruña	38	19	6	13	45	38	+7	44	Promotion playoff
5	RCD Español	38	15	12	11	50	33	+17	42	Promotion playoff
6	UD Las Palmas	38	15	10	13	42	37	+5	40	
7	CE Sabadell FC	38	13	14	11	40	39	+1	40	
8	Palamós CF	38	13	14	11	29	39	−10	40	
9	Real Murcia	38	13	12	13	38	39	−1	38	
10	Xerez CD	38	11	16	11	26	31	−5	38	
11	Sestao	38	13	10	15	33	32	+1	36	
12	UE Figueres	38	12	12	14	37	46	−9	36	
13	UD Salamanca	38	14	8	16	35	33	+2	36	
14	Elche CF	38	12	12	14	39	41	−2	36	
15	Levante UD	38	9	18	11	34	43	−9	36	
16	SD Eibar	38	11	12	15	35	42	−7	34	
17	Racing de Santander	38	11	11	16	32	36	−4	33	Relegated to Segunda División B
18	Castilla CF	38	11	9	18	36	44	−8	31	Relegated to Segunda División B
19	Recreativo de Huelva	38	12	5	21	39	56	−17	29	Relegated to Segunda División B
20	Atlético Madrileño	38	8	13	17	33	52	−19	29	Relegated to Segunda División B

Source: BDFutbol

== Results ==
Home \ Away	ATM	BET	BIL	BUR	CST	DEP	EIB	ELC	ESP	FIG	LPA	LEV	MUR	PAL	RAC	REC	SAB	SAL	SES	XER
At. Madrileño	—	2–1	0–1	1–1	1–0	1–3	2–0	0–1	2–1	1–1	2–0	1–1	4–1	2–2	1–3	2–2	2–2	2–0	1–1	0–0
Real Betis	1–0	—	2–3	0–0	1–0	1–0	1–1	2–0	1–0	2–0	1–0	0–0	1–1	1–0	0–0	3–1	1–1	1–0	1–1	0–0
Bilbao Ath.	1–1	0–0	—	1–1	0–0	1–0	2–0	2–2	1–0	4–0	3–1	1–0	3–1	1–2	3–3	3–1	1–1	0–0	0–1	3–0
Real Burgos	4–0	1–0	0–0	—	3–0	3–0	0–0	2–1	4–1	5–0	3–0	0–1	2–1	6–0	0–2	1–0	2–1	1–0	2–0	1–0
Castilla	4–0	3–1	0–1	0–0	—	0–0	1–2	2–1	1–0	0–0	0–0	3–1	3–1	1–1	1–2	3–2	1–1	0–1	0–1	1–0
Deportivo	2–0	2–0	0–0	1–1	0–1	—	0–1	1–0	2–3	1–1	2–1	1–0	1–0	2–0	1–0	4–3	1–0	3–0	1–0	2–1
Eibar	2–1	1–3	1–1	0–0	2–0	0–1	—	0–0	0–0	2–1	1–2	4–2	0–2	1–1	0–2	2–0	3–1	3–2	1–0	1–1
Elche	0–0	2–2	3–1	1–1	2–3	3–1	0–0	—	0–1	0–0	2–0	2–0	0–0	2–3	0–0	2–0	1–1	2–1	2–1	1–0
Español	1–0	2–2	2–1	4–1	1–1	2–0	2–3	2–0	—	0–1	2–1	6–0	1–1	2–0	1–0	4–0	3–0	0–1	1–0	0–0
Figueres	2–1	1–1	2–0	1–0	3–1	1–1	1–1	4–2	1–0	—	1–1	1–1	0–2	3–0	1–0	0–1	1–3	1–0	2–1	1–2
Las Palmas	2–0	1–0	3–1	0–0	4–1	1–3	3–0	1–1	2–1	1–1	—	1–1	1–0	0–0	1–0	2–1	1–0	3–1	0–1	0–1
Levante	1–1	1–1	0–0	1–3	1–0	1–0	0–0	1–1	0–0	2–0	0–0	—	2–0	1–0	3–0	1–1	1–0	1–2	2–0	1–4
Murcia	1–0	0–1	2–2	2–0	1–0	0–2	1–0	1–0	1–2	1–4	0–1	2–2	—	1–2	1–0	1–0	1–1	0–0	1–0	2–0
Palamós	2–0	0–0	0–1	1–1	1–0	0–1	1–0	2–0	0–0	1–0	0–4	1–1	1–1	—	1–0	1–3	1–0	0–0	1–0	0–0
Racing	0–1	1–3	1–2	0–0	2–1	0–3	1–0	0–1	1–0	0–0	1–1	1–1	0–0	0–0	—	1–2	4–0	1–0	0–1	3–0
Recreativo	2–1	2–1	1–0	1–2	3–1	1–0	2–2	0–2	1–1	1–0	1–0	1–1	0–1	0–1	1–2	—	2–0	1–2	2–1	0–1
Sabadell	2–0	0–2	2–1	0–0	0–0	4–0	1–0	0–2	1–1	2–1	2–1	3–1	2–2	2–0	1–1	3–0	—	0–0	1–0	0–0
Salamanca	4–0	1–1	0–2	2–0	1–3	2–0	1–0	1–0	1–1	2–0	3–0	1–0	0–0	1–1	3–0	2–0	0–1	—	0–1	0–2
Sestao Sport	0–0	0–2	2–2	0–1	2–0	2–2	2–1	3–0	2–2	4–0	0–0	1–1	1–1	0–1	1–0	1–0	0–1	1–0	—	0–0
Xerez	0–0	1–3	1–1	1–1	1–0	3–1	1–0	2–0	0–0	0–0	0–2	0–0	0–4	1–1	0–0	1–0	1–1	1–0	0–1	—

Source: BDFutbol
Legend: Blue = home team win; Yellow = draw; Red = away team win.

== Promotion playoff ==
Team 1	Agg.	Team 2	1st leg	2nd leg
CD Tenerife	1–0	Deportivo La Coruña	0–0	1–0
RCD Español	1–1 (6-5 (p.))	CD Málaga	1–0	0–1

=== First leg ===
2 June 1990	CD Tenerife	0–0	Deportivo La Coruña	Santa Cruz de Tenerife
18:00		Report (in Spanish)		Stadium: Heliodoro Rodríguez López; Attendance: 22,000; Referee: Joaquín Ramos Marco (Castile and León)

2 June 1990	RCD Español	1–0	CD Málaga	Barcelona
20:00	Gabino 76'	Report (in Spanish)		Stadium: Sarrià; Attendance: 37,000; Referee: Raúl García de Loza (Galicia (Spain))

=== Second leg ===
10 June 1990	Deportivo La Coruña	0–1 (0–1 agg.)	CD Tenerife	A Coruña
19:00		Report (in Spanish)	Eduardo 13'	Stadium: Riazor; Attendance: 35,000; Referee: José María Enríquez Negreira (Catalonia)

10 June 1990	CD Málaga	1–0 (a.e.t.) (1–1 agg.) (5–6 p)	RCD Español	Málaga
19:00	Rivas 47'	Report & Report (in Spanish)		Stadium: La Rosaleda; Attendance: 45,000; Referee: Joaquín Urío Velázquez (Basque Country (autonomous community))
	Penalties
	Antonio Mata (penalty scored); Usuriaga (penalty scored); Rivas (penalty missed); Paquito (penalty scored); Jaro (penalty missed); Matosas (penalty scored); Merino (penalty scored); Villa (penalty missed)		(penalty missed) Zubillaga; (penalty scored) Gay; (penalty scored) Escaich; (penalty missed) Andrés; (penalty scored) Wuttke; (penalty scored) Maestre; (penalty scored) Martín; (penalty scored) Albesa

== Pichichi Trophy for Top Goalscorers ==
Last updated June 21, 2009

Goalscorers	Goals	Team
(Spain) Pepe Mel	22	Real Betis
(Spain) Manolo Peña	16	Real Burgos
(Argentina) Daniel Aquino	15	Real Murcia
