= 1986–87 Segunda División =

56th season of the second-tier football league in Spain

Segunda División
- Season: 1986–87
- Champions: Valencia
- Promoted: Valencia CF; Celta; Logroñés
- Relegated: none
- Matches: 374
- Goals: 968 (2.59 per match)
- Top goalscorer: (Brazil) Baltazar

The 1986–87 Segunda División season saw 18 teams participate in the second flight Spanish league. Valencia CF won the league.

It was the longest season ever in Spanish football. The league was reduced to 18 teams and had two phases. In the first one all 18 teams played each other twice (home and away). At the end of the first phase, the first twelve teams qualified for promotion groups (Group A1 for teams that finished in an odd position and Group A2 for teams that finished in an even position) and the last six qualified for the relegation group (Group B). In the second phase, teams played only against teams of the same group twice (home and away) and carried their first phase record. Champions of promotion groups (Valencia CF and Celta de Vigo) and the best second placed team (CD Logroñés) were promoted to Primera División. The last three in the relegation group should have been relegated at the end of the season, but in the middle of the season it was decided that Primera División and Segunda División would be expanded to 20 teams. Finally, there were no relegations to Segunda División B.

== Teams ==
Location of teams in Segunda División 1986-87

Team	Home city	Stadium
Barcelona Atlètic	Barcelona	Mini Estadi
Bilbao Athletic	Bilbao	San Mamés
Cartagena FC	Cartagena	El Almarjal
CD Castellón	Castellón de la Plana	Castalia
Castilla CF	Madrid	Ciudad Deportiva
RC Celta de Vigo	Vigo	Balaídos
Deportivo La Coruña	A Coruña	Riazor
Elche CF	Elche	Nuevo Estadio
UE Figueres	Figueres	Vilatenim
Hércules CF	Alicante	José Rico Pérez
CD Logroñés	Logroño	Las Gaunas
CD Málaga	Málaga	La Rosaleda
Real Oviedo	Oviedo	Carlos Tartiere
Rayo Vallecano	Madrid	Vallecas
Recreativo de Huelva	Huelva	Colombino
Sestao Sport	Sestao	Las Llanas
Valencia CF	Valencia	Luis Casanova
Xerez CD	Jerez de la Frontera	Domecq

== First phase ==
Pos	Team	Pld	W	D	L	GF	GA	GD	Pts	Qualification
1	Valencia CF	34	19	8	7	53	26	+27	46	Group A1 (Promotion)
2	Deportivo de La Coruña	34	16	11	7	46	33	+13	43	Group A2 (Promotion)
3	CD Logroñés	34	16	9	9	46	33	+13	41	Group A1 (Promotion)
4	Celta de Vigo	34	17	6	11	56	35	+21	40	Group A2 (Promotion)
5	Recreativo de Huelva	34	18	3	13	53	44	+9	39	Group A1 (Promotion)
6	Sestao	34	13	12	9	38	23	+15	38	Group A2 (Promotion)
7	Elche CF	34	12	12	10	31	28	+3	36	Group A1 (Promotion)
8	Rayo Vallecano	34	10	15	9	28	28	0	35	Group A2 (Promotion)
9	Bilbao Athletic	34	12	11	11	51	54	−3	35	Group A1 (Promotion)
10	CD Castellón	34	13	8	13	38	42	−4	34	Group A2 (Promotion)
11	Hércules CF	34	12	8	14	38	43	−5	32	Group A1 (Promotion)
12	CD Málaga	34	10	12	12	43	39	+4	32	Group A2 (Promotion)
13	Barcelona Atlètic	34	11	10	13	42	46	−4	32	Group B (Relegation)
14	Real Oviedo	34	9	12	13	33	46	−13	30	Group B (Relegation)
15	UE Figueres	34	9	11	14	39	40	−1	29	Group B (Relegation)
16	Cartagena FC	34	7	13	14	34	51	−17	27	Group B (Relegation)
17	Castilla CF	34	7	10	17	30	51	−21	24	Group B (Relegation)
18	Xerez CD	34	4	11	19	21	58	−37	19	Group B (Relegation)

Source: BDFutbol

=== Results ===
Home \ Away	BAR	BIL	CAR	CAS	CST	CEL	DEP	ELC	FIG	HÉR	LOG	MGA	OVI	RAY	REC	SES	VAL	XER
Barcelona At.	—	6–2	1–1	3–2	1–0	0–0	1–2	2–1	3–1	2–0	0–2	2–3	1–1	4–0	3–1	0–0	2–2	4–0
Bilbao Ath.	1–1	—	1–1	1–1	3–3	2–3	2–0	2–0	2–1	1–0	2–3	1–1	2–2	1–3	1–1	0–0	3–1	2–0
Cartagena	2–0	2–4	—	4–1	0–0	3–1	0–0	1–0	2–4	1–1	1–1	0–0	3–3	0–0	2–1	1–0	0–1	1–1
Castellón	2–0	1–0	2–1	—	0–1	1–1	1–0	2–0	1–0	1–0	3–0	1–1	1–1	1–0	1–2	2–2	1–0	2–1
Castilla	2–2	1–2	3–1	1–2	—	0–1	0–1	0–3	1–1	3–2	1–2	0–0	1–0	1–0	0–2	2–0	1–2	1–0
Celta	5–0	1–2	3–0	3–1	1–1	—	2–0	4–0	2–0	3–0	2–1	3–2	3–1	2–1	1–2	2–0	2–1	4–0
Deportivo	1–1	1–0	1–0	2–0	4–1	3–0	—	1–1	2–2	3–1	1–0	2–1	1–1	3–1	1–0	2–1	1–1	2–0
Elche	1–0	2–0	2–0	2–2	1–1	1–0	0–2	—	1–1	1–1	0–0	0–0	2–0	1–0	0–1	0–0	1–1	5–0
Figueres	0–0	1–1	1–1	5–1	3–1	0–2	1–1	1–1	—	2–1	1–2	1–1	3–1	0–0	0–2	3–0	0–1	3–0
Hércules	2–1	1–3	1–2	0–1	2–1	0–0	1–0	0–0	2–0	—	3–0	1–1	4–0	0–0	4–3	0–0	0–0	3–1
Logroñés	3–0	1–3	1–0	0–0	0–0	2–0	2–2	4–1	1–0	3–0	—	0–0	2–0	1–0	3–0	1–0	2–0	2–0
Málaga	1–0	3–1	3–0	2–1	6–2	2–0	2–2	0–1	0–1	1–2	2–2	—	2–3	1–1	2–0	0–0	0–1	2–1
R. Oviedo	0–1	0–0	4–0	2–1	1–1	1–0	3–1	0–0	1–0	0–1	2–1	1–0	—	1–1	2–1	0–3	0–2	1–1
Rayo	1–0	5–1	0–0	2–1	1–0	0–0	1–1	1–0	1–2	2–1	1–1	1–0	0–0	—	1–0	0–0	0–0	2–2
Recreativo	2–0	4–1	3–0	1–0	3–0	3–2	2–0	0–1	1–1	1–2	3–1	4–1	2–0	3–1	—	1–0	1–1	2–1
Sestao Sport	5–0	3–1	3–1	1–1	3–0	1–0	0–0	1–0	2–0	2–0	0–0	2–1	1–0	0–0	4–0	—	0–3	3–0
Valencia	0–1	0–2	2–1	2–0	1–0	3–2	3–1	0–1	1–0	4–1	1–0	1–0	4–1	0–0	5–1	1–0	—	6–0
Xerez	0–0	1–1	2–2	1–0	0–0	1–1	1–2	0–1	1–0	0–1	2–1	1–2	0–0	0–1	2–0	1–1	0–0	—

Source: BDFutbol
Legend: Blue = home team win; Yellow = draw; Red = away team win.

== Second phase ==
=== Group A1 (Promotion) ===
Pos	Team	Pld	W	D	L	GF	GA	GD	Pts	Promotion
1	Valencia CF	44	24	9	11	67	36	+31	57 (Note: Valencia CF was declared champion of Segunda División for having a better record than Celta de Vigo.)	Promoted to Primera División
2	CD Logroñés	44	22	10	12	59	43	+16	54 (Note: CD Logroñés was promoted to Primera División for having a better record than Sestao.)	Promoted to Primera División
3	Recreativo de Huelva	44	23	4	17	66	56	+10	50	
4	Elche CF	44	17	14	13	45	43	+2	48	
5	Hércules CF	44	16	9	19	55	56	−1	41	
6	Bilbao Athletic	44	14	11	19	61	75	−14	39	

Source: BDFutbol

==== Results ====
Home \ Away	BIL	ELC	HÉR	LOG	REC	VAL
Bilbao Ath.	—	1–2	1–3	1–2	3–1	3–2
Elche	2–1	—	3–0	0–0	1–1	2–1
Hércules	4–0	0–1	—	4–1	3–1	1–1
Logroñés	2–0	4–1	2–1	—	1–0	1–0
Recreativo	2–0	2–1	2–1	2–0	—	2–0
Valencia	1–0	5–1	1–0	1–0	2–0	—

Source: BDFutbol
Legend: Blue = home team win; Yellow = draw; Red = away team win.

=== Group A2 (Promotion) ===
Pos	Team	Pld	W	D	L	GF	GA	GD	Pts	Promotion
1	Celta de Vigo	44	23	8	13	71	41	+30	54 (Note: Valencia CF was declared champion of Segunda División for having a better record than Celta de Vigo.)	Promoted to Primera División
2	Sestao	44	19	14	11	47	27	+20	52 (Note: CD Logroñés was promoted to Primera División for having a better record than Sestao.)	
3	Deportivo de La Coruña	44	19	13	12	58	47	+11	51	
4	CD Castellón	44	16	12	16	44	52	−8	44	
5	Rayo Vallecano	44	12	17	15	40	44	−4	41	
6	CD Málaga	44	12	16	16	57	57	0	40	

Source: BDFutbol

==== Results ====
Home \ Away	CAS	CEL	DEP	MGA	RAY	SES
Castellón	—	0–0	0–0	1–1	0–0	1–0
Celta	4–0	—	3–0	4–1	1–0	1–0
Deportivo	0–2	0–1	—	3–0	3–2	1–2
Málaga	4–1	1–0	2–2	—	2–2	1–1
Rayo	0–1	4–1	1–3	3–2	—	0–2
Sestao	1–0	0–0	1–0	1–0	1–0	—

Source: BDFutbol
Legend: Blue = home team win; Yellow = draw; Red = away team win.

=== Group B (Relegation) ===
Since Primera and Segunda División would be expanded to 20 teams, no teams were relegated to Segunda División B.

Pos	Team	Pld	W	D	L	GF	GA	GD	Pts
1	Barcelona Atlètic	44	16	10	18	56	58	−2	42
2	UE Figueres	44	15	12	17	59	53	+6	42
3	Cartagena FC	44	14	14	16	52	67	−15	42
4	Real Oviedo	44	13	14	17	50	64	−14	40
5	Castilla CF	44	11	11	22	49	71	−22	33
6	Xerez CD	44	5	12	27	32	78	−46	22

Source: BDFutbol

==== Results ====
Home \ Away	BAR	CAR	CST	FIG	OVI	XER
Barcelona At.	—	3–2	2–3	3–0	2–0	2–1
Cartagena	1–0	—	2–1	2–1	1–0	2–0
Castilla	2–0	1–2	—	1–2	2–5	3–0
Figueres	1–0	6–1	1–1	—	3–0	3–1
R. Oviedo	2–1	4–4	3–1	0–2	—	2–1
Xerez	0–1	0–1	3–4	4–1	1–1	—

Source: BDFutbol
Legend: Blue = home team win; Yellow = draw; Red = away team win.

== Pichichi Trophy for top goalscorers ==
Last updated June 21, 2009

Goalscorers	Goals	Team
(Brazil) Baltazar	34	Celta de Vigo
(Uruguay) Noel Alzugaray	24	Recreativo de Huelva
(Spain) Vicente Celeiro	22	Deportivo de La Coruña
