= Vladimir Gudelj =

Bosnian footballer (born 1966)

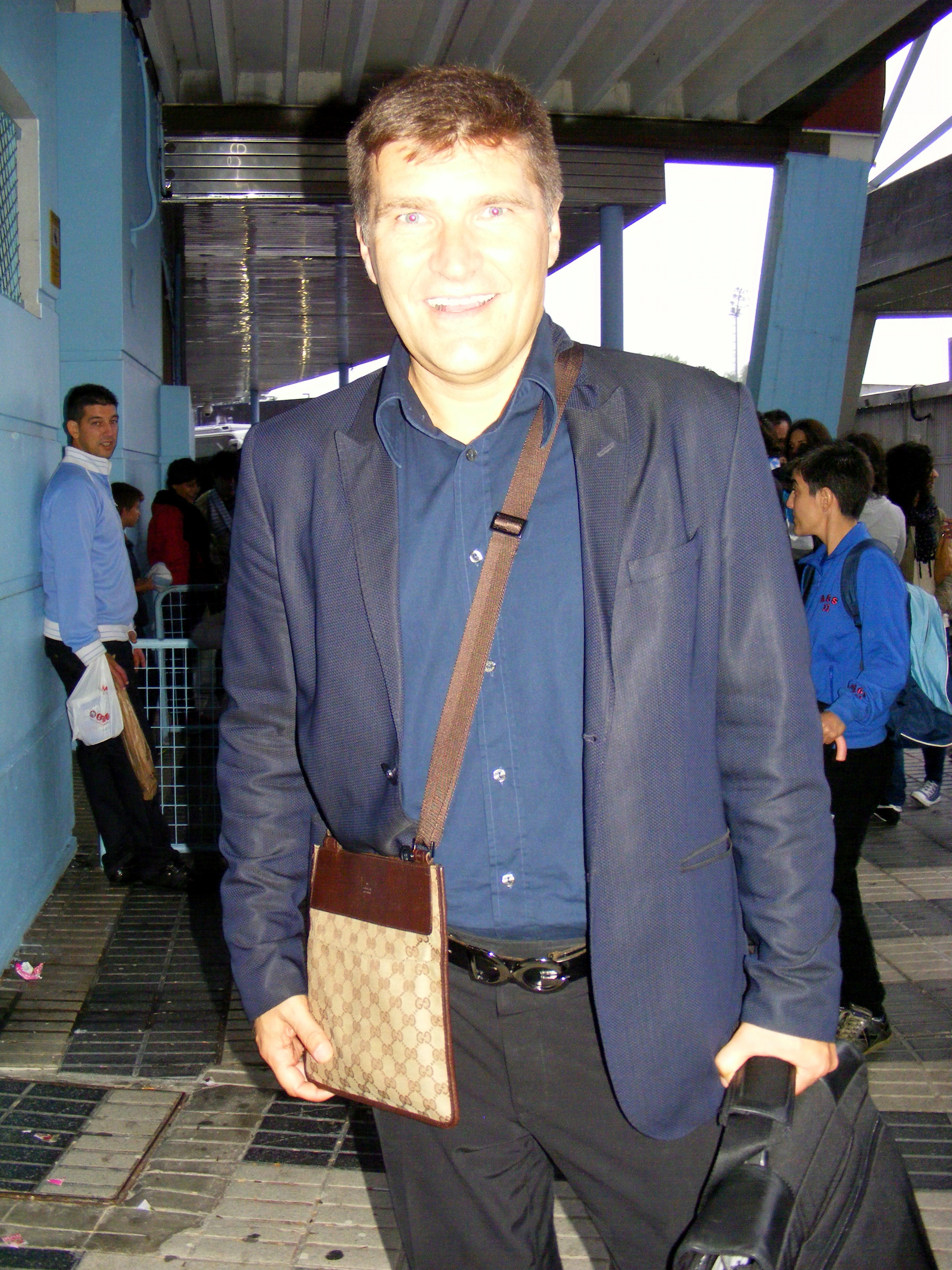
- Gudelj in 2013

Personal information
- Date of birth: 27 December 1966 (age 59)
- Place of birth: Trebinje, SFR Yugoslavia
- Height: 1.85 m (6 ft 1 in)
- Position: Striker

Senior career*
Years	Team	Apps	(Gls)
1985–1991	Velež Mostar	146	(55)
1991–1999	Celta	231	(95)
1999–2001	Compostela	55	(19)
Total		432	(169)
- * Club domestic league appearances and goals

Vladimir Gudelj (born 27 December 1966) is a Bosnian former professional footballer who played as a striker.

An excellent penalty taker, he was best known for his eight-year spell with Spain's Celta.

== Career ==
Gudelj was born in Trebinje, Socialist Federal Republic of Yugoslavia. After making his professional debuts with FK Velež Mostar he moved to Spain, signing with RC Celta de Vigo in the second division. He scored 27 league goals in his debut season, the Galicians promoted to La Liga and the player continued to lead the scoring charts for his club the following five years.

Gudelj left Celta in 1999 as the player with most goals in its history, with almost 100 (68 in the top flight alone). He then joined neighbours SD Compostela, returning to the second level and being the best scorer of the team in both campaigns.

In the summer of 2001 Gudelj returned to Celta, going on to work in the public relations department.

== Honours ==
Celta Vigo

- Segunda División: 1991–92

Velež Mostar'

- Kup Maršala Tita: 1985–86

Individual

- Pichichi Trophy (Segunda División): 1991–92
