= 1991–92 Segunda División =

61st season of the second-tier football league in Spain

Segunda División
- Season: 1991–92
- Champions: Celta de Vigo
- Promoted: Celta de Vigo; Rayo Vallecano
- Relegated: Real Murcia; CD Málaga; Real Avilés Industrial; UD Las Palmas
- Matches: 380
- Goals: 821 (2.16 per match)
- Top goalscorer: (Socialist Federal Republic of Yugoslavia) Vladimir Gudelj

The 1991–92 Segunda División season saw 20 teams participate in the second flight Spanish league. Celta de Vigo won the league.

Celta and Rayo Vallecano were promoted to Primera División. Real Murcia, CD Málaga, Real Avilés and UD Las Palmas were relegated to Segunda División B.

== Teams ==
Location of teams in Segunda División 1991-92
Canary Islands

| Team | Home city | Stadium |
|---|---|---|
| Athletic Bilbao B | Bilbao | San Mamés |
| Real Avilés | Avilés | Juan Muro de Zaro |
| Barcelona B | Barcelona | Mini Estadi |
| Real Betis | Seville | Benito Villamarín |
| Castellón | Castellón de la Plana | Nou Castàlia |
| Celta | Vigo | Balaídos |
| Compostela | Santiago de Compostela | Santa Isabel |
| Eibar | Eibar | Ipurua |
| Figueres | Figueres | Vilatenim |
| Las Palmas | Las Palmas | Insular |
| Lleida | Lleida | Camp d'Esports |
| Málaga | Málaga | La Rosaleda |
| Mérida | Mérida | Municipal de Mérida |
| Murcia | Murcia | La Condomina |
| Palamós | Palamós | Nou Municipal |
| Real Madrid B | Madrid | Ciudad Deportiva |
| Racing de Santander | Santander | El Sardinero |
| Rayo Vallecano | Madrid | Vallecas |
| Sabadell | Sabadell | Nova Creu Alta |
| Sestao Sport | Sestao | Las Llanas |

== Final table ==
| Pos | Team | Pld | W | D | L | GF | GA | GD | Pts | Promotion or relegation |
|---|---|---|---|---|---|---|---|---|---|---|
| 1 | Celta de Vigo | 38 | 22 | 9 | 7 | 61 | 26 | +35 | 53 | Promoted to Primera División |
| 2 | Rayo Vallecano | 38 | 20 | 8 | 10 | 52 | 27 | +25 | 48 | Promoted to Primera División |
| 3 | UE Figueres | 38 | 16 | 15 | 7 | 43 | 27 | +16 | 47 | Promotion playoff |
| 4 | Real Betis | 38 | 18 | 10 | 10 | 54 | 43 | +11 | 46 | Promotion playoff |
| 5 | UE Lleida | 38 | 17 | 9 | 12 | 52 | 36 | +16 | 43 | |
| 6 | Barcelona B | 38 | 17 | 7 | 14 | 59 | 53 | +6 | 41 | |
| 7 | CP Mérida | 38 | 16 | 9 | 13 | 58 | 48 | +10 | 41 | |
| 8 | SD Compostela | 38 | 15 | 11 | 12 | 36 | 32 | +4 | 41 | |
| 9 | CE Sabadell FC | 38 | 16 | 6 | 16 | 34 | 35 | −1 | 38 | |
| 10 | Racing de Santander | 38 | 15 | 7 | 16 | 39 | 44 | −5 | 37 | |
| 11 | Real Murcia (Note: Real Murcia was relegated to Segunda División B for not becoming public limited company. Then, Sestao was readmitted in Segunda División.) | 38 | 11 | 14 | 13 | 32 | 36 | −4 | 36 | Relegated to Segunda División B |
| 12 | SD Eibar | 38 | 11 | 14 | 13 | 19 | 22 | −3 | 36 | |
| 13 | Bilbao Athletic | 38 | 12 | 11 | 15 | 36 | 40 | −4 | 35 | |
| 14 | Palamós CF | 38 | 13 | 9 | 16 | 39 | 46 | −7 | 35 | |
| 15 | CD Castellón | 38 | 13 | 9 | 16 | 42 | 48 | −6 | 35 | |
| 16 | Real Madrid B | 38 | 11 | 12 | 15 | 44 | 55 | −11 | 34 | |
| 17 | Sestao | 38 | 11 | 10 | 17 | 26 | 44 | −18 | 32 | |
| 18 | CD Málaga (Note: CD Málaga disappeared at the end of the season.) | 38 | 10 | 10 | 18 | 25 | 45 | −20 | 30 | Relegated to Segunda División B |
| 19 | Real Avilés | 38 | 9 | 9 | 20 | 31 | 56 | −25 | 27 | Relegated to Segunda División B |
| 20 | UD Las Palmas | 38 | 8 | 9 | 21 | 39 | 58 | −19 | 25 | Relegated to Segunda División B |

Source: BDFutbol

== Results ==
| Home \ Away | ATH | AVI | BAR | BET | CAS | CEL | COM | EIB | FIG | LPA | LLE | MGA | MÉR | MUR | PAL | RAC | RAY | RMA | SAB | SES |
|---|---|---|---|---|---|---|---|---|---|---|---|---|---|---|---|---|---|---|---|---|
| Athletic B | — | 2–0 | 1–0 | 3–3 | 2–1 | 0–0 | 0–0 | 1–0 | 2–0 | 2–5 | 1–0 | 1–0 | 1–2 | 0–1 | 1–0 | 1–1 | 0–1 | 0–0 | 1–2 | 3–0 |
| Real Avilés | 1–1 | — | 1–1 | 2–2 | 2–1 | 2–3 | 0–0 | 0–0 | 1–1 | 1–2 | 0–1 | 3–2 | 4–2 | 3–2 | 1–0 | 1–0 | 0–2 | 3–0 | 0–1 | 0–0 |
| Barcelona B | 2–0 | 5–2 | — | 1–0 | 3–2 | 4–1 | 1–0 | 1–0 | 0–0 | 2–1 | 4–1 | 2–0 | 5–3 | 2–2 | 1–2 | 0–1 | 0–3 | 3–3 | 3–0 | 2–1 |
| Betis | 0–0 | 2–0 | 1–0 | — | 1–1 | 1–0 | 3–1 | 2–1 | 3–0 | 3–0 | 3–3 | 2–1 | 3–1 | 2–1 | 1–0 | 3–0 | 4–2 | 1–0 | 2–0 | 4–1 |
| Castellón | 3–1 | 1–0 | 1–1 | 1–1 | — | 0–2 | 0–1 | 1–0 | 1–3 | 0–0 | 2–0 | 1–1 | 0–2 | 1–0 | 1–2 | 2–0 | 2–1 | 4–1 | 2–0 | 2–0 |
| Celta | 1–0 | 2–0 | 2–0 | 3–0 | 1–1 | — | 4–1 | 1–1 | 2–0 | 3–0 | 3–0 | 3–0 | 2–2 | 1–1 | 3–0 | 5–0 | 1–0 | 2–1 | 2–0 | 4–0 |
| Compostela | 0–3 | 5–1 | 1–1 | 0–0 | 0–2 | 2–0 | — | 1–0 | 0–0 | 2–0 | 3–2 | 1–0 | 0–1 | 3–1 | 1–0 | 0–1 | 1–0 | 2–0 | 0–1 | 1–2 |
| Eibar | 1–1 | 0–0 | 2–1 | 0–0 | 1–0 | 0–1 | 0–0 | — | 2–0 | 1–0 | 0–0 | 1–0 | 0–0 | 0–0 | 2–0 | 0–1 | 0–0 | 1–0 | 0–0 | 1–0 |
| Figueres | 3–2 | 1–0 | 3–0 | 0–0 | 0–0 | 2–0 | 0–0 | 0–0 | — | 1–1 | 1–3 | 0–1 | 2–0 | 0–0 | 2–0 | 0–0 | 1–2 | 2–0 | 2–1 | 2–0 |
| Las Palmas | 0–0 | 2–0 | 3–1 | 1–0 | 1–2 | 1–2 | 0–0 | 0–1 | 1–2 | — | 1–2 | 1–2 | 0–2 | 1–1 | 1–2 | 1–1 | 3–0 | 1–2 | 1–0 | 0–0 |
| Lleida | 4–1 | 2–0 | 1–1 | 6–2 | 4–1 | 2–0 | 2–0 | 2–0 | 1–1 | 2–2 | — | 0–1 | 2–2 | 2–0 | 2–0 | 0–1 | 1–0 | 1–0 | 0–1 | 1–0 |
| Málaga | 1–0 | 1–0 | 0–1 | 0–0 | 0–0 | 0–2 | 0–1 | 0–0 | 0–5 | 2–1 | 0–1 | — | 1–1 | 1–0 | 1–1 | 2–1 | 0–1 | 2–1 | 0–0 | 0–0 |
| Mérida | 0–0 | 6–0 | 3–2 | 3–2 | 1–1 | 2–1 | 0–1 | 1–0 | 1–2 | 3–2 | 0–0 | 3–0 | — | 3–0 | 2–1 | 1–1 | 0–1 | 2–2 | 0–1 | 0–1 |
| Murcia | 1–0 | 0–1 | 2–1 | 1–0 | 3–0 | 2–1 | 0–0 | 1–0 | 0–0 | 2–1 | 0–0 | 2–1 | 0–1 | — | 2–1 | 2–0 | 1–1 | 0–1 | 0–1 | 0–0 |
| Palamós | 1–1 | 0–1 | 0–1 | 1–0 | 3–1 | 0–0 | 0–3 | 3–0 | 0–0 | 1–2 | 1–0 | 1–0 | 3–2 | 2–2 | — | 1–0 | 0–0 | 2–2 | 1–1 | 3–1 |
| Racing | 3–0 | 1–0 | 3–0 | 0–1 | 2–0 | 1–1 | 0–2 | 0–2 | 1–2 | 3–0 | 0–4 | 5–2 | 0–1 | 3–1 | 0–3 | — | 0–0 | 2–0 | 1–0 | 4–0 |
| Rayo | 1–0 | 2–0 | 1–4 | 3–0 | 4–1 | 0–0 | 1–0 | 2–0 | 1–1 | 3–0 | 1–0 | 0–0 | 1–2 | 0–0 | 4–0 | 1–0 | — | 4–0 | 2–0 | 4–0 |
| R. Madrid B | 0–3 | 2–1 | 1–0 | 3–1 | 3–1 | 0–1 | 2–2 | 1–1 | 1–1 | 3–3 | 1–0 | 1–1 | 3–2 | 1–1 | 0–0 | 4–0 | 3–1 | — | 2–1 | 0–2 |
| Sabadell | 2–0 | 0–0 | 1–2 | 3–0 | 0–2 | 0–1 | 3–0 | 1–0 | 0–2 | 2–0 | 2–0 | 1–2 | 1–0 | 1–0 | 3–2 | 0–0 | 1–2 | 1–0 | — | 1–1 |
| Sestao Sport | 0–1 | 1–0 | 4–1 | 0–1 | 1–0 | 0–0 | 1–1 | 0–1 | 0–1 | 2–0 | 0–0 | 1–0 | 2–1 | 0–0 | 1–2 | 1–2 | 1–0 | 0–0 | 2–1 | — |

Source: BDFutbol
Legend: Blue = home team win; Yellow = draw; Red = away team win.

== Promotion playoff ==
| Team 1 | Agg. | Team 2 | 1st leg | 2nd leg |
|---|---|---|---|---|
| Deportivo La Coruña | 2–1 | Real Betis | 2–1 | 0–0 |
| Cádiz CF | 3–1 | UE Figueres | 2–0 | 1–1 |

=== First leg ===
| 10 June 1992 | Deportivo La Coruña | 2–1 | Real Betis | A Coruña |
| 21:00 | Albístegui 25' (pen.); Kiryakov 59' | Report (in Spanish) | Loreto 46' | Stadium: Riazor; Attendance: 25,000; Referee: Joaquín Urio Velázquez (Basque Country (autonomous community)) |

| 14 June 1992 | Cádiz CF | 2–0 | UE Figueres | Cádiz |
| 20:00 | Tilico 42'; Fali 79' | Report (in Spanish) | | Stadium: Ramón de Carranza; Attendance: 15,000; Referee: Manuel Díaz Vega (Asturias) |

=== Second leg ===
| 17 June 1992 | Real Betis | 0–0 (1–2 agg.) | Deportivo La Coruña | Seville |
| 21:30 | | Report (in Spanish) | | Stadium: Benito Villamarín; Attendance: 55,000; Referee: Juan Ansuátegui Roca (Valencian Community) |

| 21 June 1992 | UE Figueres | 1–1 (1–3 agg.) | Cádiz CF | Figueres |
| 20:00 | Altimira 86' | Report (in Spanish) | Quevedo 75' | Stadium: Vilatenim; Attendance: 9,400; Referee: Raúl García de Loza (Galicia (Spain)) |
