= 1996–97 SD Compostela season =

Compostela
1996–97 season
- President: José María Caneda
- Head coach: Fernando Vázquez
- Stadium: Estadio Multiusos de San Lázaro
- La Liga: 11th
- Copa del Rey: Round of 16
- Top goalscorer: League: Christopher Ohen (17); All: Lyuboslav Penev (20)

1996–97 was the 35th season in the history of SD Compostela, and their third in La Liga.

== Season summary ==
Fernando Vázquez's second season as Compostela coach was almost as successful as his first, as the club finished 11th in La Liga, only one place lower than the previous year. They once again reached the last 16 of the Copa del Rey, being eliminated 5–2 on aggregate at that stage by Atlético Madrid.

== Squad ==
Note: Flags indicate national team as defined under FIFA eligibility rules; some limited exceptions apply. Players may hold more than one non-FIFA nationality.

No.	Pos.	Nation	Player
1	GK	ESP	Javier Falagán
2	DF	ESP	Javier Villena
3	DF	ESP	Nacho
4	DF	YUG	Goran Šaula
5	DF	ESP	Javier Bellido (captain)
6	MF	FRA	Franck Passi
7	FW	DEN	Bent Christensen
8	MF	BRA	Fabiano
9	FW	NGA	Christopher Ohen
10	MF	RUS	Dmitri Popov
11	MF	ESP	Ángel Lekumberri
12	GK	ESP	Rafa Gómez
12	DF	BRA	William

No.	Pos.	Nation	Player
13	GK	ESP	Fernando
14	MF	ESP	José Ramón
15	MF	ESP	Pirri
16	MF	ESP	Paco Llorente
17	MF	ESP	Carlos Sastre
18	FW	ESP	Manuel
19	MF	ESP	Iñaki Eraña
20	FW	BRA	Maurício Leandro
21	DF	ESP	José Manuel Galdames
22	MF	ESP	Mauro García
23	DF	NED	Juan Viedma
24	MF	MAR	Saïd Chiba
25	FW	BUL	Lyuboslav Penev

=== Left club during season ===
Note: Flags indicate national team as defined under FIFA eligibility rules; some limited exceptions apply. Players may hold more than one non-FIFA nationality.

No.	Pos.	Nation	Player
20	MF	ESP	Toni (to Racing de Ferrol)

== Squad stats ==
Last updated on 10 March 2021.

No.	Pos	Nat	Player	Total		La Liga		Copa del Rey	
No.	Pos	Nat	Player	Apps	Goals	Apps	Goals	Apps	Goals
1	GK	(Spain) ESP	Javier Falagán	21	0	19	0	1+1	0
2	DF	(Spain) ESP	Javier Villena	26	0	22+1	0	2+1	0
3	DF	(Spain) ESP	Nacho	35	2	33	2	2	0
4	DF	(Federal Republic of Yugoslavia) YUG	Goran Šaula	15	0	10+3	0	2	0
5	DF	(Spain) ESP	Javier Bellido	40	1	28+6	1	5+1	0
6	MF	(France) FRA	Franck Passi	42	1	38	1	3+1	0
7	FW	(Denmark) DEN	Bent Christensen	6	1	0+4	1	1+1	0
8	MF	(Brazil) BRA	Fabiano	42	6	39	6	2+1	0
9	FW	(Nigeria) NGA	Christopher Ohen	34	17	25+8	17	1	0
10	MF	(Russia) RUS	Dmitri Popov	32	1	15+12	1	4+1	0
11	MF	(Spain) ESP	Ángel Lekumberri	41	0	36+2	0	3	0
12	GK	(Spain) ESP	Rafa Gómez	18	0	16	0	2	0
12	DF	(Brazil) BRA	William	21	1	18+2	1	1	0
13	GK	(Spain) ESP	Fernando	10	0	7	0	3	0
14	MF	(Spain) ESP	José Ramón	23	0	13+8	0	2	0
15	MF	(Spain) ESP	Pirri	15	0	7+5	0	2+1	0
16	MF	(Spain) ESP	Paco Llorente	23	0	11+7	0	4+1	0
17	MF	(Spain) ESP	Carlos Sastre	6	0	2+2	0	1+1	0
18	FW	(Spain) ESP	Manuel	42	4	15+22	2	4+1	2
19	MF	(Spain) ESP	Iñaki Eraña	19	0	5+10	0	4	0
20	FW	(Brazil) BRA	Maurício Leandro	6	0	0+3	0	1+2	0
21	DF	(Spain) ESP	José Manuel Galdames	29	0	23+1	0	5	0
22	MF	(Spain) ESP	Mauro García	40	2	36+2	1	2	1
23	DF	(Netherlands) NED	Juan Viedma	21	1	8+8	1	4+1	0
24	MF	(Morocco) MAR	Saïd Chiba	19	2	5+10	2	2+2	0
25	FW	(Bulgaria) BUL	Lyuboslav Penev	37	20	31+4	16	2	4
Players who have left the club after the start of the season:
20	MF	(Spain) ESP	Toni	1	0	0	0	1	0

== La Liga ==
Pos	Team	Pld	W	D	L	GF	GA	GD	Pts
9	Tenerife	42	15	11	16	69	57	+12	56 (Note: VAL 2–1 TEN; TEN 2–1 VAL)
10	Valencia	42	15	11	16	63	59	+4	56
11	Compostela	42	13	14	15	52	65	−13	53
12	Espanyol	42	14	9	19	51	57	−6	51
13	Racing Santander	42	11	17	14	52	54	−2	50 (Note: RAC: 9 pts; ZAR: 6 pts; SPG: 3 pts)

Source: LFP
Rules for classification: 1) points; 2) head-to-head points; 3) head-to-head goal difference; 4) head-to-head goals scored; 5) goal difference; 6) number of goals scored.

== See also ==
- SD Compostela
- 1996–97 La Liga
- 1996–97 Copa del Rey
