= 1995–96 SD Compostela season =

Compostela
1995–96 season
- President: José María Caneda
- Head coach: Fernando Vázquez
- Stadium: Estadio Multiusos de San Lázaro
- La Liga: 10th
- Copa del Rey: Round of 16
- Top goalscorer: League: Bent Christensen (12); All: Bent Christensen (14)

1995–96 was the 34th season in the history of SD Compostela, and their second in La Liga.

== Season summary ==
Compostela began their second season in the top flight by searching for a new manager, as Fernando Castro Santos, who had been with the club since their Tercera División days, left to join fellow Galician club Celta Vigo. He was replaced by Lugo manager Fernando Vázquez, who led Compos to the best league result in their history in his first season: they finished the season in a highly respectable 10th place. They also reached the last 16 of the Copa del Rey before being beaten 3–1 on aggregate by Sevilla, which was also their best performance in that competition up to that point. They would eventually better in by reaching the quarter-finals in 1999–2000.

== Squad ==
Note: Flags indicate national team as defined under FIFA eligibility rules; some limited exceptions apply. Players may hold more than one non-FIFA nationality.

No.	Pos.	Nation	Player
1	GK	ESP	Javier Falagán
2	DF	ESP	Javier Villena
3	DF	ESP	Nacho
4	DF	ESP	Fernando Tocornal
5	DF	ESP	Javier Bellido
6	MF	FRA	Franck Passi
7	FW	DEN	Bent Christensen
8	MF	BRA	Fabiano
9	FW	NGA	Christopher Ohen
10	FW	ESP	Juan Carlos Paniagua
11	MF	ESP	Ángel Lekumberri

No.	Pos.	Nation	Player
12	DF	ESP	Toño Castro
13	GK	ESP	Fernando
14	MF	ESP	José Ramón
15	FW	NGA	Festus Agu
16	MF	ESP	Paco Llorente
17	DF	ESP	Jesús Dulce (on loan from Logroñés)
18	DF	ESP	Virgilio Hernández
19	MF	ESP	Iñaki Eraña
20	MF	ESP	Toni
21	MF	ESP	Agustín Abadía
22	MF	ESP	Mauro García

=== Left club during season ===
Note: Flags indicate national team as defined under FIFA eligibility rules; some limited exceptions apply. Players may hold more than one non-FIFA nationality.

No.	Pos.	Nation	Player
15	MF	CRO	Dragan Skočić (to Rijeka)

== Squad stats ==
Last updated on 10 March 2021.

No.	Pos	Nat	Player	Total		La Liga		Copa del Rey	
No.	Pos	Nat	Player	Apps	Goals	Apps	Goals	Apps	Goals
1	GK	(Spain) ESP	Javier Falagán	42	0	42	0	0	0
2	DF	(Spain) ESP	Javier Villena	45	3	38+1	3	5+1	0
3	DF	(Spain) ESP	Nacho	44	0	39	0	5	0
4	DF	(Spain) ESP	Fernando Tocornal	35	1	26+5	0	4	1
5	DF	(Spain) ESP	Javier Bellido	44	2	37+1	2	6	0
6	MF	(France) FRA	Franck Passi	41	0	35	0	6	0
7	FW	(Denmark) DEN	Bent Christensen	43	14	27+11	12	4+1	2
8	MF	(Brazil) BRA	Fabiano	40	5	35	5	4+1	0
9	FW	(Nigeria) NGA	Christopher Ohen	38	12	34	11	3+1	1
10	FW	(Spain) ESP	Juan Carlos Paniagua	19	2	1+14	2	1+3	0
11	MF	(Spain) ESP	Ángel Lekumberri	43	4	37	3	5+1	1
12	DF	(Spain) ESP	Toño Castro	9	1	4+4	1	1	0
13	GK	(Spain) ESP	Fernando	6	0	0	0	6	0
14	MF	(Spain) ESP	José Ramón	44	6	39+1	6	4	0
15	FW	(Nigeria) NGA	Festus Agu	9	0	0+8	0	0+1	0
16	MF	(Spain) ESP	Paco Llorente	11	0	4+7	0	0	0
17	DF	(Spain) ESP	Jesús Dulce	12	0	5+5	0	2	0
18	DF	(Spain) ESP	Virgilio Hernández	18	1	3+14	1	1	0
19	MF	(Spain) ESP	Iñaki Eraña	42	0	24+14	0	2+2	0
20	MF	(Spain) ESP	Toni	5	0	1+3	0	1	0
21	MF	(Spain) ESP	Agustín Abadía	17	0	3+11	0	2+1	0
22	MF	(Spain) ESP	Mauro García	44	1	28+10	1	3+3	0
Players who have left the club after the start of the season:
20	MF	(Croatia) CRO	Dragan Skočić	3	0	0+1	0	1+1	0

== La Liga ==
Pos	Team	Pld	W	D	L	GF	GA	GD	Pts
8	Real Betis	42	16	14	12	61	54	+7	62
9	Deportivo La Coruña	42	16	13	13	63	44	+19	61
10	Compostela	42	17	8	17	47	54	−7	59
11	Celta Vigo	42	12	16	14	49	51	−2	52
12	Sevilla	42	11	15	16	43	55	−12	48 (Note: SEV: 10 pts;ZAR: 8 pts; ROV: 6 pts → ROV 0–0 ATH; ATH: 6 pts → ATH 0–1 ROV)

Source: LFP
Rules for classification: 1) points; 2) head-to-head points; 3) head-to-head goal difference; 4) head-to-head goals scored; 5) goal difference; 6) number of goals scored.

== See also ==
- SD Compostela
- 1995–96 La Liga
- 1995–96 Copa del Rey
