= 1994–95 SD Compostela season =

Compostela
1994–95 season
- President: José María Caneda
- Head coach: Fernando Castro Santos
- Stadium: Estadio Multiusos de San Lázaro
- La Liga: 16th
- Copa del Rey: Fourth round
- Top goalscorer: League: Christopher Ohen (14); All: Christopher Ohen (14)

1994–95 was the 33rd season in the history of SD Compostela, and their first in La Liga.

== Season summary ==
Compostela completed their rise from the Tercera División under Fernando Castro Santos by winning promotion via the Segunda División playoffs in 1994. They drew 1–1 on aggregate with Rayo Vallecano, before winning a tiebreak match in Oviedo. The first La Liga season in their history was a moderate success, as they ended in 16th place, avoiding the relegation playoffs thanks to their superior head-to-head record against Albacete Balompié. Compostela were eliminated in the fourth round of the Copa del Rey by Segunda División side Lleida.

Castro Santos left his post at the end of the season to take over at fellow Galician club Celta Vigo, and was replaced by Lugo manager Fernando Vázquez.

== Squad ==
Note: Flags indicate national team as defined under FIFA eligibility rules; some limited exceptions apply. Players may hold more than one non-FIFA nationality.

No.	Pos.	Nation	Player
—	GK	ESP	Ramón Docobo
—	GK	ESP	Javier Falagán
—	GK	ESP	Aitor Iru
—	DF	ESP	Javier Bellido
—	DF	ESP	Toño Castro
—	DF	ESP	José Manuel Galdames (on loan from Athletic Bilbao)
—	DF	ESP	Goio
—	DF	ESP	Modesto
—	DF	ESP	Nacho
—	DF	ESP	Fernando Tocornal
—	DF	ESP	Javier Villena
—	MF	ESP	Agustín Abadía
—	MF	ESP	Óscar Arias

No.	Pos.	Nation	Player
—	MF	BRA	Fabiano
—	MF	ESP	Ángel Lekumberri
—	MF	ESP	Paco Llorente
—	MF	FRA	Franck Passi
—	MF	CRO	Dragan Skočić
—	MF	ESP	Toni
—	MF	ESP	Víctor Manuel
—	FW	DEN	Bent Christensen
—	FW	ESP	José
—	FW	ESP	Jesús Moure
—	FW	ESP	Pichi Lucas
—	FW	NGA	Christopher Ohen
—	FW	ESP	Juan Carlos Paniagua

=== Left club during season ===
Note: Flags indicate national team as defined under FIFA eligibility rules; some limited exceptions apply. Players may hold more than one non-FIFA nationality.

No.	Pos.	Nation	Player
—	MF	ESP	Alberto Bodelón (to Racing de Ferrol)

== Squad stats ==
Last updated on 12 March 2021.

No.	Pos	Nat	Player	Total		La Liga		Copa del Rey	
No.	Pos	Nat	Player	Apps	Goals	Apps	Goals	Apps	Goals
	GK	(Spain) ESP	Ramón Docobo	2	0	1+1	0	0	0
	GK	(Spain) ESP	Javier Falagán	0	0	0	0	0	0
	GK	(Spain) ESP	Aitor Iru	41	0	37	0	4	0
	DF	(Spain) ESP	Javier Bellido	36	2	35	2	1	0
	DF	(Spain) ESP	Toño Castro	14	0	8+3	0	2+1	0
	DF	(Spain) ESP	José Manuel Galdames	13	0	13	0	0	0
	DF	(Spain) ESP	Goio	11	0	7+1	0	3	0
	DF	(Spain) ESP	Modesto	24	0	19+2	0	2+1	0
	DF	(Spain) ESP	Nacho	25	0	21	0	4	0
	DF	(Spain) ESP	Fernando Tocornal	34	1	31	1	3	0
	DF	(Spain) ESP	Javier Villena	31	1	24+3	1	3+1	0
	MF	(Spain) ESP	Agustín Abadía	40	3	33+3	2	3+1	1
	MF	(Spain) ESP	Óscar Arias	1	0	0+1	0	0	0
	MF	(Brazil) BRA	Fabiano	38	4	35	2	3	2
	MF	(Spain) ESP	Ángel Lekumberri	40	1	36	1	4	0
	MF	(Spain) ESP	Paco Llorente	18	1	9+7	1	1+1	0
	MF	(France) FRA	Franck Passi	37	2	33+1	2	3	0
	MF	(Croatia) CRO	Dragan Skočić	2	0	0+2	0	0	0
	MF	(Spain) ESP	Toni	0	0	0	0	0	0
	MF	(Spain) ESP	Víctor Manuel	15	0	7+6	0	1+1	0
	FW	(Denmark) DEN	Bent Christensen	38	11	32+2	11	4	0
	FW	(Spain) ESP	José	5	0	1+4	0	0	0
	FW	(Spain) ESP	Jesús Moure	19	2	2+16	2	0+1	0
	FW	(Spain) ESP	Pichi Lucas	15	4	1+13	4	0+1	0
	FW	(Nigeria) NGA	Christopher Ohen	33	14	28+3	14	2	0
	FW	(Spain) ESP	Juan Carlos Paniagua	13	1	3+9	0	1	1
Players who have left the club after the start of the season:
	MF	(Spain) ESP	Alberto Bodelón	2	0	2	0	0	0

== La Liga ==
Pos	Team	Pld	W	D	L	GF	GA	GD	Pts	Qualification or relegation
14	Atlético Madrid	38	13	9	16	56	54	+2	35 (Note: TEN 1–0 ATM; ATM 3–1 TEN)	
15	Tenerife	38	13	9	16	57	57	0	35	
16	Compostela	38	11	12	15	44	56	−12	34 (Note: ALB 1–3 COM; COM 0–0 ALB)	
17	Albacete (Note: On July 31, 1995, Sevilla and Celta Vigo were relegated to Segunda División B for not providing documentation (an audit) nor making their payments to the Royal Spanish Football Federation within the time limit. The two best qualified teams to be relegated, Albacete and Valladolid were readmitted to La Liga. Later, Sevilla and Celta Vigo claimed that according to the law they had another 15 working days because they made allegations days before. Finally, the solution was to not relegate any involved team and expand the league to 22 teams for the next two seasons.)	38	10	14	14	44	61	−17	34	Qualification for the relegation playoffs
18	Sporting Gijón (O)	38	8	12	18	42	67	−25	28	Qualification for the relegation playoffs

Source: LFP
Rules for classification: 1) points; 2) head-to-head points; 3) head-to-head goal difference; 4) head-to-head goals scored; 5) goal difference; 6) number of goals scored.
(O) Play-off winners

== See also ==
- SD Compostela
- 1994–95 La Liga
- 1994–95 Copa del Rey
