= Rafa Gómez (footballer, born 1974) =

Spanish retired footballer

Personal information
- Full name: Rafael Gómez Company
- Date of birth: 5 January 1974 (age 52)
- Place of birth: Moncada, Spain
- Height: 1.86 m (6 ft 1 in)
- Position: Goalkeeper

Senior career*
Years	Team	Apps	(Gls)
1994–1996	Valencia Mestalla	30	(0)
1995–1996	Valencia	0	(0)
1996	Racing de Ferrol	16	(0)
1997–2002	Compostela	125	(0)
2002–2003	Levante	44	(0)
2003–2004	Lorca Deportiva	39	(0)
Total		254	(0)
- * Club domestic league appearances and goals

Rafael "Rafa" Gómez Company (born 5 January 1974 in Moncada, Horta Nord, Valencia) is a Spanish retired footballer who played as a goalkeeper.

== Career ==
Gómez began his career with local giants Valencia, playing for their B team, Valencia Mestalla, during the 1994–95 Segunda División B season. He was part of the first team squad that finished as La Liga runners-up the following year, but didn't play any matches. He left to join Racing de Ferrol ahead of the 1996–97 season, but stayed only six months before joining top flight side SD Compostela in the January transfer window. He spent a little over five years with Compostela, enduring relegation to the Segunda División in 1997–98, and again to the third tier in 2000–01.

Gómez played a key role in the first part of the following season, which ended with Compostela earning promotion directly back to the second division, but he left the club in March 2002 to join Levante. After a year and a half with Levante in the Segunda División, he dropped down a level with Lorca Deportiva in 2003. He played in every match bar one in his first season with Lorca, helping them to the runners-up spot in their Segunda División B group, although they failed to win promotion via the play-offs. After two matches of the 2004–05 season, which did end in promotion for Lorca, Gómez suffered an injury to his thumb, and was forced into retirement at the age of 30.

== Honours ==
Valencia

- La Liga runners-up: 1995–96

Lorca Deportiva

- Segunda División B runners-up: 2003–04

== Career statistics ==
As of 10 March 2021

Club	Season	League			Cup		Other		Total	
Club	Season	Division	Apps	Goals	Apps	Goals	Apps	Goals	Apps	Goals
Valencia Mestalla	1994–95	Segunda División B	30	0	–		2	0	32	0
Valencia Mestalla	1995–96	Segunda División B	0	0	–		–		0	0
Valencia Mestalla	Total		30	0	0	0	2	0	32	0
Valencia	1995–96	La Liga	0	0	0	0	–		0	0
Racing de Ferrol	1996–97	Segunda División B	16	0	1	0	–		17	0
Compostela	1996–97	La Liga	16	0	2	0	–		18	0
Compostela	1997–98	La Liga	18	0	0	0	2	0	20	0
Compostela	1998–99	Segunda División	18	0	0	0	–		18	0
Compostela	1999–2000	Segunda División	18	0	0	0	–		18	0
Compostela	2000–01	Segunda División	28	0	0	0	–		28	0
Compostela	2001–02	Segunda División B	27	0	1	0	–		28	0
Compostela	Total		125	0	3	0	2	0	130	0
Levante	2001–02	Segunda División	10	0	0	0	–		10	0
Levante	2002–03	Segunda División	34	0	0	0	–		34	0
Levante	Total		44	0	0	0	0	0	44	0
Lorca Deportiva	2003–04	Segunda División B	37	0	1	0	6	0	44	0
Lorca Deportiva	2004–05	Segunda División B	2	0	0	0	–		2	0
Lorca Deportiva	Total		39	0	1	0	6	0	46	0
Career total			254	0	5	0	10	0	269	0

1. Appearances in the 1995 Segunda División B play-offs
2. Appearances in the 1997–98 La Liga relegation play-off
3. Appearances in the 2004 Segunda División B play-offs
