= Mauro García =

Spanish association football player

Personal information
- Full name: Mauro García Juncal
- Date of birth: 21 May 1971 (age 55)
- Place of birth: Moaña, Spain
- Height: 1.77 m (5 ft 9 1/2 in)
- Positions: Right back; midfielder

Senior career*
Years	Team	Apps	(Gls)
1989–1995	Pontevedra	194	(23)
1995–2000	Compostela	170	(7)
2000–2003	Rayo Vallecano	38	(2)
2003–2006	Pontevedra	61	(1)
Total		463	(33)
- * Club domestic league appearances and goals

Mauro García Juncal (born 21 May 1971) in a Spanish retired footballer who could play as a right back or midfielder.

== Career ==
Mauro García was born in Moaña, in the province of Pontevedra in Galicia, and began his career with Pontevedra CF. He played for Pontevedra in Segunda División B for six years, from 1989 to 1995, before taking the step up to La Liga with Compostela. He spent three seasons in the top flight with Compostela, until they were relegated after losing a playoff at the end of the 1997–98 season. He continued to represent Compostela for the following two seasons in the Segunda División, before returning to the top division with Rayo Vallecano in 2000. He participated in the sole European campaign in Rayo's history during his first season, making his European debut in a 1–0 away win over Molde of Norway in the UEFA Cup first round on 14 September.

Rayo were relegated in 2002–03, and Mauro left the club that summer to rejoin his first club, Pontevedra. Pontevedra were promoted via the playoffs after winning their Segunda División B group in 2003–04, but were relegated again after just one season in the second tier. Mauro retired at the end of the 2005–06 season, having just passed his 35th birthday.

== Honours ==
Pontevedra

- Segunda División B: 2003–04

== Career statistics ==
As of 9 March 2021

Club	Season	League			Cup		Europe		Other		Total	
Club	Season	Division	Apps	Goals	Apps	Goals	Apps	Goals	Apps	Goals	Apps	Goals
Pontevedra	1989–90	Segunda División B	29	3	–		–		–		29	3
Pontevedra	1990–91	Segunda División B	35	4	1	0	–		–		36	4
Pontevedra	1991–92	Segunda División B	28	3	1	0	–		–		29	3
Pontevedra	1992–93	Segunda División B	34	2	2	0	–		–		36	2
Pontevedra	1993–94	Segunda División B	35	3	4	0	–		–		39	3
Pontevedra	1994–95	Segunda División B	33	8	–		–		6	0	39	8
Pontevedra	Total		194	23	8	0	0	0	6	0	208	23
Compostela	1995–96	La Liga	38	1	6	0	–		–		44	1
Compostela	1996–97	La Liga	38	1	2	1	–		–		40	2
Compostela	1997–98	La Liga	26	0	2	1	–		2	0	30	1
Compostela	1998–99	Segunda División	32	2	2	0	–		–		34	2
Compostela	1999–2000	Segunda División	36	3	6	0	–		–		42	3
Compostela	Total		170	7	18	2	0	0	2	0	190	9
Rayo Vallecano	2000–01	La Liga	25	2	3	0	5	0	–		33	2
Rayo Vallecano	2001–02	La Liga	1	0	2	0	–		–		3	0
Rayo Vallecano	2002–03	La Liga	12	0	0	0	–		–		12	0
Rayo Vallecano	Total		38	2	5	0	5	0	0	0	48	2
Pontevedra	2003–04	Segunda División B	31	0	2	0	–		6	0	39	0
Pontevedra	2004–05	Segunda División	21	1	2	0	–		–		23	1
Pontevedra	2005–06	Segunda División B	9	0	1	0	–		–		10	0
Pontevedra	Total		61	1	5	0	0	0	6	0	72	1
Pontevedra total			255	24	13	0	0	0	12	0	280	24
Career total			463	33	36	2	5	0	14	0	518	35

1. Appearances in the 1995 Segunda División B playoffs
2. Appearances in the 1997–98 La Liga relegation playoff
3. Appearances in the 2000–01 UEFA Cup
4. Appearances in the 2004 Segunda División B playoffs
