= Juan Viedma =

Juan Viedma may refer to:

- Juan Viedma (footballer) (born 1974), Spanish-Dutch retired footballer
- Juan Viedma (athlete), Paralympic athlete from Spain
