= Javier Villena =

Spanish footballer

Personal information
- Full name: Francisco Javier Mulero Villena
- Date of birth: 17 August 1966 (age 60)
- Place of birth: Barcelona, Spain
- Height: 1.78 m (5 ft 10 in)
- Position: Centre back

Senior career*
Years	Team	Apps	(Gls)
1985–1988	Barcelona Amateur	76	(9)
1987–1990	Barcelona Atlètic	70	(14)
1990–1991	Real Burgos	36	(0)
1991–1994	Real Mallorca	84	(4)
1994–2000	Compostela	129	(5)
2000–2001	Gimnàstic de Tarragona	22	(1)
Total		417	(33)
- * Club domestic league appearances and goals

Francisco Javier Mulero Villena (born 17 August 1966) is a Spanish retired footballer who played as a centre back. He began his career with Barcelona, but never played for the first team. He went on to make 156 appearances in La Liga over six seasons for Real Burgos, Real Mallorca and Compostela, scoring four goals.

== Career ==
Villena was born in Barcelona, capital of the autonomous community of Catalonia, and began his career with local giants FC Barcelona. He made his first appearances for the C team, Barcelona Amateur, during the 1985–86 season, in which they were relegated from Segunda División B. However, he was a key part of the side that won promotion at the first attempt the following year as winners of their Tercera División group. In 1987–88 he began playing for the B team, Barcelona Atlètic, in the Segunda División, with whom he also suffered relegation in 1988–89. He was never included in the first team squad, and left Barcelona in 1990 to join newly promoted La Liga side Real Burgos.

Villena made his top flight debut on 2 September in the first match of the season, as Burgos hosted Cádiz at Estadio El Plantío. He played the full 90 minutes as the hosts ran out 1–0 winners. After just one season with Burgos, he joined top division rivals Real Mallorca ahead of the 1991–92, at the end of which they were relegated. He continued to play with Mallorca for a further two seasons in the Segunda División, before returning to La Liga with newly promoted Compostela in 1994. He played for Compostela throughout their four-year stay in the top flight, before they were relegated in 1997–98 after losing a playoff.

Villena stayed with Compostela in the second tier for another two seasons, and then joined Gimnàstic de Tarragona in Segunda División B in 2000. He helped Nàstic earn promotion in what turned out to be his only season at the club, before retiring in 2001 as he approached his 35th birthday.

== Honours ==
Barcelona Amateur

- Tercera División: 1986–87

== Career statistics ==
As of 10 March 2021

Club	Season	League			Cup		Other		Total	
Club	Season	Division	Apps	Goals	Apps	Goals	Apps	Goals	Apps	Goals
Barcelona Amateur	1985–86	Segunda División B	7	0	–		–		7	0
Barcelona Amateur	1986–87	Tercera División	36	3	–		–		36	3
Barcelona Amateur	1987–88	Segunda División B	33	6	4	1	–		37	7
Barcelona Amateur	Total		76	9	4	1	0	0	80	10
Barcelona Atlètic	1987–88	Segunda División	2	0	0	0	–		2	0
Barcelona Atlètic	1988–89	Segunda División	34	3	5	0	–		39	3
Barcelona Atlètic	1989–90	Segunda División B	34	11	4	0	–		38	11
Barcelona Atlètic	Total		70	14	9	0	0	0	79	14
Real Burgos	1990–91	La Liga	36	0	4	0	–		40	0
Real Mallorca	1991–92	La Liga	21	0	2	0	–		23	0
Real Mallorca	1992–93	Segunda División	27	4	7	0	1	0	35	4
Real Mallorca	1993–94	Segunda División	36	0	2	0	–		38	0
Real Mallorca	Total		84	4	11	0	1	0	96	4
Compostela	1994–95	La Liga	27	1	4	0	–		31	1
Compostela	1995–96	La Liga	39	3	6	0	–		45	3
Compostela	1996–97	La Liga	23	0	3	0	–		26	0
Compostela	1997–98	La Liga	10	0	1	0	2	0	13	0
Compostela	1998–99	Segunda División	5	0	3	0	–		8	0
Compostela	1999–2000	Segunda División	25	1	6	0	–		31	1
Compostela	Total		129	5	23	0	2	0	154	5
Gimnàstic de Tarragona	2000–01	Segunda División B	22	1	–		–		22	1
Career total			417	33	51	1	3	0	471	34

1. Appearance in the 1992–93 Segunda División promotion playoff
2. Appearances in the 1997–98 La Liga relegation playoff
