= Festus Agu =

Nigerian footballer (born 1975)

Personal information
- Date of birth: 13 March 1975 (age 51)
- Place of birth: Enugu, Nigeria
- Height: 1.85 m (6 ft 1 in)
- Position: Forward

Youth career
- 1988–1989: NITEL Vasco Gama
- 1989–1990: African Continental Bank

Senior career*
Years	Team	Apps	(Gls)
1990–1991	Bendel United	19	(11)
1991–1992	Enugu Rangers	5	(1)
1992–1993	Bendel Insurance	5	(3)
1993–1994	Enugu Rangers	21	(13)
1994–1995	Club Bolívar	5	(1)
1995–1997	Compostela	8	(0)
1996–1997	→ Ourense (loan)	9	(0)
1997–1998	Optik Rathenow	22	(14)
1998–1999	Fortuna Köln	7	(0)
1999	FC Gütersloh		
2000–2001	Schweinfurt 05	22	(11)
2001–2002	VfR Aalen	21	(14)
2002–2003	Wacker Burghausen	11	(2)
2003–2005	FC St. Pauli	38	(8)
2005–2006	Enugu Rangers		
- * Club domestic league appearances and goals

Festus Agu // (born 13 March 1975) is a Nigerian former professional footballer who played as a forward.

== Football career ==
=== Beginnings ===
Agu was born in Enugu, and began his career in his country with Nitel Vasco Dagama FC Enugu, African Continental Bank FC Lagos, Bendel United, Enugu Rangers and Bendel Insurance FC. During his development years, he was considered to be the most promising footballer in the nation.

At the age of 19, Agu moved abroad joining Club Bolívar in Bolivia, having no impact whatsoever in one season.

=== Spain ===
Agu ventured to Spain in 1995, joining La Liga side SD Compostela. The club's chairman José María Caneda described him as "...a mix between Ronaldo and Bent Christensen" (the latter a player in the team). During his stint, he shared teams with countryman Christopher Ohen but played only eight times in the season, going scoreless in the process.

In the following campaign, Agu was loaned to Galician neighbours CD Ourense in Segunda División, where he met exactly the same individual fate.

=== Germany ===
Agu played the following eight years in Germany, starting with FSV Optik Rathenow in the NOFV-Oberliga. In his only season he scored a career-high 14 league goals, and his performances resulted in a move to SC Fortuna Köln in the 2. Bundesliga. In the following campaign, after failing to find the net, he signed with fellow league side FC Gütersloh; his spell would be short-lived, however, due to the club temporarily dissolving because of debt.

In 2000, Agu joined 1. FC Schweinfurt 05 in the Regionalliga Süd, scoring 11 goals in his first year as the club promoted to the second level. He was not re-signed however, and subsequently stayed in the category to play for VfR Aalen, netting 14 times as the Baden-Württemberg team finished in fourth place, three points shy of promotion.

In the summer of 2002, Agu returned to the second division signing for SV Wacker Burghausen. However, he failed to replicate his previous goalscoring record and was ultimately released at the end of the season. Afterwards, he played with FC St. Pauli in the Regionalliga Nord, scoring six goals in his first year but only two in the following.

=== Retirement ===
At the age of 30, Agu retired following series of injuries and relocated to the United Kingdom to start a new career in law. Agu is now a qualified and practicing solicitor in England and Wales].
