= Modesto López =

Spanish former football player

Modesto
Personal information
- Full name: Modesto López Novoa
- Date of birth: 21 January 1965 (age 61)
- Place of birth: Ourense, Spain
- Height: 1.80 m (5 ft 11 in)
- Position: Centre back

Senior career*
Years	Team	Apps	(Gls)
1983–1986	Ourense	34	(1)
1986–1990	Deportivo La Coruña	58	(2)
1991–1995	Compostela	123	(0)
1995–1999	Ourense	116	(2)
Total		331	(5)
- * Club domestic league appearances and goals

Modesto López Novoa (born 21 January 1965), known simply as Modesto, is a Spanish former professional footballer who played as a centre back.

== Career ==
Modesto was born in Ourense, capital of the province of the same name, in the autonomous community of Galicia, and began his career with CD Ourense. He made his debut in 1983, and was part of the team that earned promotion from the Tercera División in 1984–85. He left the club in 1986, joining fellow Galicians Deportivo La Coruña in the Segunda División. He stayed with Depor for four and a half seasons, leaving in the January transfer window of the 1990–91 season, at the end of which Deportivo were promoted. He then signed for a third Galician club, Compostela, who were then in Segunda División B. In Modesto's first season, they earned promotion via the play-offs.

Modesto was still an important part of the Compostela side when they won a second promotion, again via a play-off, in 1993–94, reaching La Liga for the first time in their history. Modesto made his top flight debut in the exalted surroundings of Santiago Bernabéu Stadium against giants Real Madrid on 23 October 1994, and helped Compostela earn an unexpected 1–1 draw. He ultimately played 21 matches in the top division that season, but left at the end of the year to rejoin Ourense. His second stint at his hometown club lasted four seasons, during which time he experienced the highs of promotion to the Segunda División in 1995–96, and relegation back again in 1998–99. He retired in 1999 at the age of 34.

== Honours ==
Deportivo la Coruña

- Segunda División runners-up: 1990–91

== Career statistics ==
As of 11 March 2021

Club	Season	League			Cup		Other		Total	
Club	Season	Division	Apps	Goals	Apps	Goals	Apps	Goals	Apps	Goals
CD Ourense	1983–84	Tercera División	?	?	3	0	–		3	0
CD Ourense	1984–85	Tercera División	?	?	3	0	–		3	0
CD Ourense	1985–86	Segunda División B	34	1	3	0	–		37	1
CD Ourense	Total		34	1	9	0	0	0	43	1
Deportivo La Coruña	1986–87	Segunda División	19	0	2	0	–		21	0
Deportivo La Coruña	1987–88	Segunda División	27	2	2	0	–		29	2
Deportivo La Coruña	1988–89	Segunda División	11	0	6	0	–		17	0
Deportivo La Coruña	1989–90	Segunda División	1	0	0	0	–		1	0
Deportivo La Coruña	1990–91	Segunda División	0	0	0	0	–		0	0
Deportivo La Coruña	Total		58	2	10	0	0	0	68	2
Compostela	1990–91	Segunda División B	20	0	0	0	6	0	26	0
Compostela	1991–92	Segunda División	33	0	5	0	–		38	0
Compostela	1992–93	Segunda División	29	0	4	0	–		33	0
Compostela	1993–94	Segunda División	20	0	4	0	3	0	27	0
Compostela	1994–95	La Liga	21	0	3	0	–		24	0
Compostela	Total		123	0	16	0	9	0	148	0
Ourense	1995–96	Segunda División B	30	1	0	0	6	0	36	1
Ourense	1996–97	Segunda División	34	0	0	0	–		34	0
Ourense	1997–98	Segunda División	40	0	3	0	–		43	0
Ourense	1998–99	Segunda División	12	1	0	0	–		12	1
Ourense	Total		116	2	3	0	6	0	125	2
Ourense total			150	3	12	0	6	0	168	3
Career total			331	5	38	0	15	0	384	5

1. Appearances in the 1991 Segunda División B play-offs
2. Appearance in the 1993–94 Segunda División promotion play-off
3. Appearances in the 1996 Segunda División B play-offs
