= Fernando Peralta =

Spanish footballer (born 1961)

Fernando
Personal information
- Full name: Fernando Peralta Carrasco
- Date of birth: 15 August 1961 (age 65)
- Place of birth: Ronda, Spain
- Height: 1.79 m (5 ft 10 in)
- Position: Goalkeeper

Youth career
- Málaga

Senior career*
Years	Team	Apps	(Gls)
1980–1986	Málaga	131	(0)
1986–1990	Sevilla	80	(0)
1990–1992	Málaga	66	(0)
1992–1995	Castellón	109	(0)
1995–1997	Compostela	7	(0)
Total		393	(0)

International career
1981	Spain U19	4	(0)
1981	Spain U20	4	(0)
1981–1983	Spain U21	3	(0)
- * Club domestic league appearances and goals

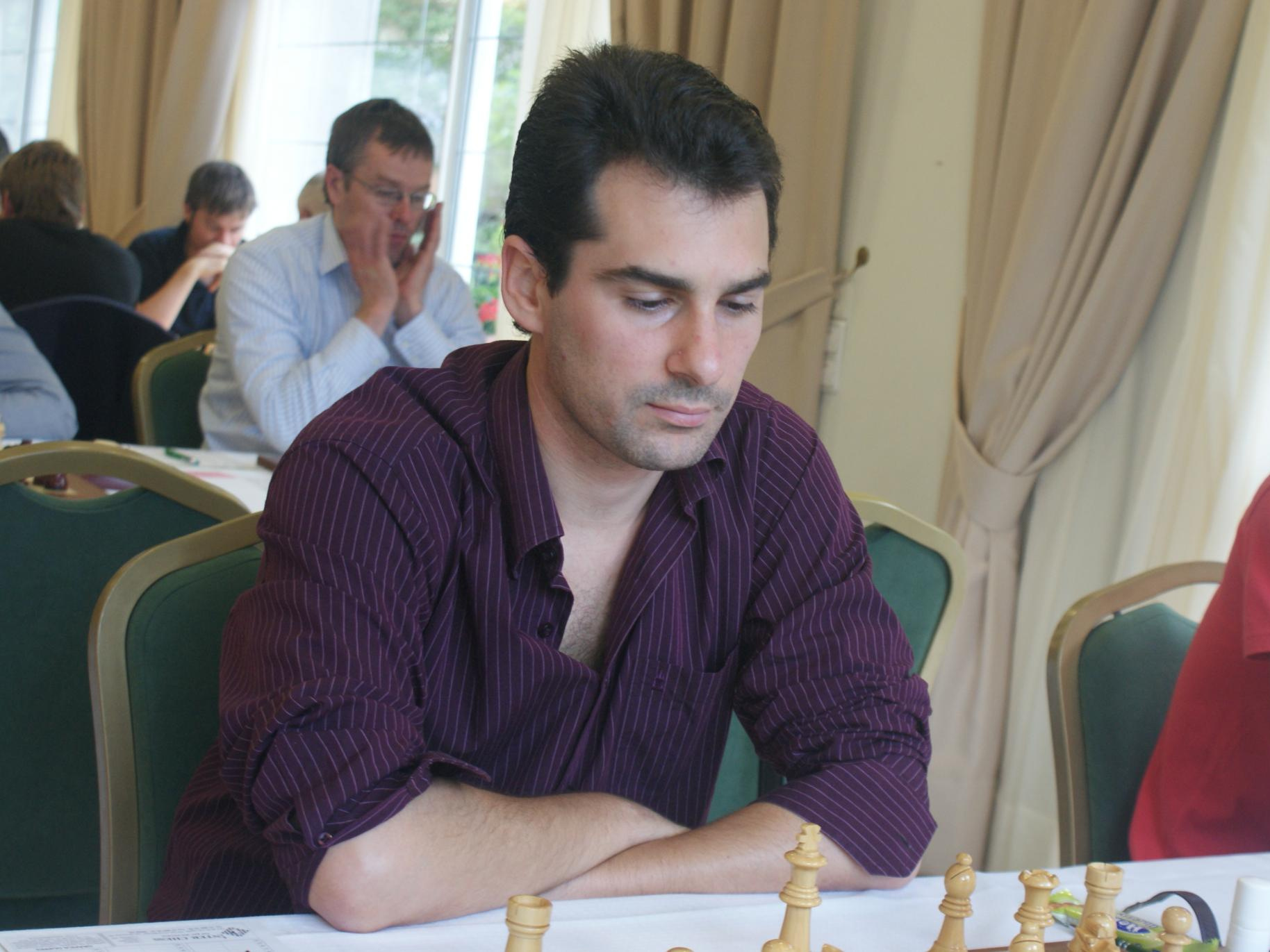
Fernando Peralta, 2013

Fernando Peralta Carrasco (born 15 August 1961), known simply as Fernando, is a Spanish former professional footballer who played as a goalkeeper.

His career was mostly spent with Málaga and Sevilla, totalling 203 official games across two spells with the former. In all, he played 162 La Liga matches, also representing Compostela in the division.

== Club career ==
Born in Ronda, Andalusia, Fernando began his career at nearby CD Málaga. He made his professional debut on 14 December 1980, coming on as a 53rd-minute substitute for the injured José Luis Burgueña in a 2–1 Segunda División home win against neighbours Recreativo de Huelva. The following 8 February, he made his first start in a 1–0 away victory over Palencia CF; he totalled 17 appearances over the season whilst conceding 19 goals, adding two the following campaign as the club won promotion.

Fernando made his La Liga debut on 4 September 1982, in a 1–1 home draw against Sporting de Gijón. He played all of the first seven games of the season, but only one more in its remainder; he then became an undisputed starter, missing only two league matches over the next three years and being relegated in 1985.

In July 1986, Fernando returned to the top flight, signing for neighbours Sevilla FC. He played 38 games in his first season at the Ramón Sánchez-Pizjuán Stadium to help to a final 12th place, being sent off towards the end of a 1–0 away loss to Real Valladolid on 2 November 1986; after the acquisition of Soviet Rinat Dasayev, he became a backup.

Fernando returned to Málaga in the 1990 offseason, being a starter during his two-year spell in the second tier. On 31 March 1991, he received a red card in a 3–0 defeat at UD Las Palmas; he contributed 28 appearances in 1991–92, but the side finished third from the bottom and folded soon after.

On 11 July 1992, Fernando left his native region for the first time, joining fellow top-division CD Castellón on a two-year contract. He played consistently over three seasons, suffering another relegation in the second.

Fernando returned to the top division in summer 1995, at SD Compostela. All of his league appearances for the Galicians came during the 1996–97 campaign, and he was sent off late into his second in a 0–3 home loss against Valencia CF. On 12 October, in a 1–5 defeat to FC Barcelona also at the Estadio Multiusos de San Lázaro, he conceded a famous goal from Ronaldo who had run from his own half; the Brazilian described it as the most beautiful of his career.

== International career ==
All age groups comprised, Fernando won 11 caps for Spain at youth level. He represented the under-20 team at the 1981 FIFA World Youth Championship, starting in an eventual group stage exit.

Fernando made his debut for the under-21s on 6 June 1981, in a 0–0 draw against Colombia in the Toulon Tournament.

== Post-retirement ==
After retiring, Fernando worked in coaching children around Málaga, in addition to work as a football analyst for Canal Sur and Diario Sur in the region.

== Personal life ==
Fernando was the sixth of ten siblings, nine of them male. His younger brother, Luis, spent his career as a defender in the lower leagues.

== Honours ==
Spain Under-21

- UEFA Under-21 European Championship runner-up: 1984
