= Ángel Lekumberri =

Spanish former football player

Personal information
- Full name: Ángel M. Lekumberri García
- Date of birth: 21 January 1970 (age 56)
- Place of birth: Pamplona, Spain
- Height: 1.83 m (6 ft 0 in)
- Position: Midfielder

Senior career*
Years	Team	Apps	(Gls)
1988–1991	Langreo	50	(2)
1991–1994	Athletic Bilbao B	111	(8)
1994–2000	Compostela	199	(12)
2000–2002	Osasuna	59	(0)
2003–2004	Levante	11	(0)
2004–2006	Langreo		
2006–2007	Cudillero		
Total		430	(22)

International career
2000	Basque Country	1	(0)
- * Club domestic league appearances and goals

Ángel M. Lekumberri García (born 21 January 1970), also spelled Ángel Lekunberri, is a Spanish former footballer who played as a midfielder. In a career spanning almost two decades, he played with a variety of clubs in all of Spain's top four divisions, and made 199 appearances in La Liga during spells with Compostela and Osasuna, scoring six goals.

== Club career ==
Lekumberri was born in Pamplona, the capital of the autonomous community of Navarre, but began his career with Asturian club Langreo. He made his debut in Segunda División B towards the end of the 1987–88 season, becoming a regular member of the team the following year. Langreo were relegated at the end of 1990–91, but Lekumberri left to join Athletic Bilbao. He spent three seasons with Bilbao, playing exclusively with their B team in the Segunda División. His strong performances earned him a move in the summer of 1994 to newly promoted La Liga side Compostela, and he made his top flight debut on 11 September in a 2–2 away draw with Real Oviedo at Estadio Carlos Tartiere.

He was a key part of the Compostela team for the whole of their four-year stay in the top division, before they were relegated after losing a playoff at the end of the 1997–98 season. He continued to represent the side for two seasons in the second tier, before returning to La Liga with his hometown club Osasuna in 2000. He enjoyed two strong seasons, but played only three times in the first half of 2002–03, so he left to join Levante in the January transfer window. Levante were promoted as Segunda División champions in 2003–04, but Lekumberri didn't make a single appearance in the league that year, and left the club at the end of the season.

After leaving Levante, Lekumberri returned to his first club, Langreo, who were now playing in the Tercera División. He spent two years with Langreo, and one with fellow Tercera División club Cudillero, before retiring in 2007 at the age of 37.

== International career ==
Despite being born in Navarre, Lekumberri appeared once for the Basque Country representative side, in a 3–2 win over Morocco in 2000.

== Personal life ==
Lekumberri's brother Francisco, younger by four years, was also a footballer. He played as a defender, and represented Siero in Segunda División B during the 2000–01 season.

== Career statistics ==
Appearances and goals by club, season and competition
Club	Season	League			Cup		Other		Total	
Club	Season	Division	Apps	Goals	Apps	Goals	Apps	Goals	Apps	Goals
Langreo	1987–88	Segunda División B	1	0	0	0	–		1	0
Langreo	1988–89	Segunda División B	21	1	1	0	–		22	1
Langreo	1990–91	Segunda División B	28	1	0	0	–		28	1
Langreo	Total		50	2	1	0	0	0	51	2
Athletic Bilbao B	1991–92	Segunda División	37	2	–		–		37	2
Athletic Bilbao B	1992–93	Segunda División	38	3	–		–		38	3
Athletic Bilbao B	1993–94	Segunda División	36	3	–		–		36	3
Athletic Bilbao B	Total		111	8	0	0	0	0	111	8
Compostela	1994–95	La Liga	36	1	4	0	–		40	1
Compostela	1995–96	La Liga	37	3	6	1	–		43	4
Compostela	1996–97	La Liga	38	0	3	0	–		41	0
Compostela	1997–98	La Liga	29	2	4	0	2 (Note: Appearances in the 1997–98 La Liga relegation playoff)	0	35	2
Compostela	1998–99	Segunda División	21	1	3	0	–		24	1
Compostela	1999–2000	Segunda División	38	5	6	1	–		44	6
Compostela	Total		199	12	26	2	2	0	227	14
Osasuna	2000–01	La Liga	32	0	0	0	–		32	0
Osasuna	2001–02	La Liga	26	0	2	0	–		28	0
Osasuna	2002–03	La Liga	1	0	2	0	–		3	0
Osasuna	Total		59	0	4	0	0	0	63	0
Levante	2002–03	Segunda División	11	0	0	0	–		11	0
Levante	2003–04	Segunda División	0	0	4	0	–		4	0
Levante	Total		11	0	4	0	0	0	15	0
Career total			430	22	35	2	2	0	467	24

== Honours ==
Levante

- Segunda División: 2003–04
