= Gran Peña FC =

Spanish football club

Gran Peña
- Full name: Gran Peña Fútbol Club
- Founded: 1926; 100 years ago
- Ground: Barreiro, Vigo, Galicia, Spain
- Capacity: 4,500
- Manager: Martín Blanco
- League: Tercera Federación – Group 1
- 2025–26: Tercera Federación – Group 1, 6th of 18
- Website: granpenha.com
Home colours	Away colours

Gran Peña Fútbol Club is a Spanish football club based in the parish of Lavadores, Vigo, in the autonomous community of Galicia. Founded in 1926 it currently plays in Tercera Federación – Group 1, holding home games at Municipal de Barreiro, with a 4,500-seat capacity.

== History ==
In 2021 the club signed an agreement with Celta de Vigo, turning Gran Peña into Celta's 2nd reserve team, under the name Celta C - Gran Peña.

=== Club background ===
- Club Gran Peña (1926–71)
- Club Gran Peña Celtista (1971–88)
- Gran Peña Fútbol Club (1988–2021; 2024–)
- Real Club Celta de Vigo "C" - Gran Peña (2021–2024)

== Season to season ==
Season	Tier	Division	Place	Copa del Rey
1944–45	4	Serie A	3rd	
1945–46	4	Serie A	5th	
1946–47	4	Serie A	7th	
1947–48	4	Serie A	3rd	
1948–49	4	Serie A	10th	
1949–50	4	Serie A	8th	
1950–51	4	Serie A	3rd	
1951–52	4	Serie A	4th	
1952–53	4	Serie A	5th	
1953–54	4	Serie A	7th	
1954–55	4	Serie A	2nd	
1955–56	4	Serie A	1st	
1956–57	3	3ª	9th	
1957–58	3	3ª	3rd	
1958–59	3	3ª	6th	
1959–60	3	3ª	9th	
1960–61	3	3ª	10th	
1961–62	3	3ª	13th	
1962–63	3	3ª	11th	
1963–64	3	3ª	13th	

Season	Tier	Division	Place	Copa del Rey
1964–65	3	3ª	5th	
1965–66	3	3ª	14th	
1966–67	3	3ª	8th	
1967–68	3	3ª	5th	
1968–69	3	3ª	10th	
1969–70	3	3ª	13th	
1970–71	4	Serie A	3rd	
1971–72	4	Serie A	1st	
1972–73	3	3ª	17th	
1973–74	4	Serie A	1st	
1974–75	3	3ª	17th	
1975–76	4	Serie A	2nd	
1976–77	3	3ª	19th	
1977–78	4	3ª	5th	
1978–79	4	3ª	5th	
1979–80	4	3ª	18th	
1980–81	4	3ª	3rd	
1981–82	4	3ª	5th	
1982–83	4	3ª	5th	
1983–84	4	3ª	5th	

Season	Tier	Division	Place	Copa del Rey
1984–85	4	3ª	7th	
1985–86	4	3ª	4th	
1986–87	4	3ª	8th	
1987–88	4	3ª	11th	
1988–89	4	3ª	8th	
1989–90	4	3ª	7th	
1990–91	4	3ª	9th	
1991–92	4	3ª	12th	
1992–93	4	3ª	19th	
1993–94	5	Reg. Pref.	2nd	
1994–95	4	3ª	15th	
1995–96	4	3ª	14th	
1996–97	4	3ª	7th	
1997–98	4	3ª	11th	
1998–99	4	3ª	18th	
1999–2000	5	Reg. Pref.	19th	
2000–01	6	1ª Reg.	1st	
2001–02	5	Reg. Pref.	6th	
2002–03	5	Reg. Pref.	10th	
2003–04	5	Reg. Pref.	6th	

Season	Tier	Division	Place	Copa del Rey
2004–05	5	Reg. Pref.	7th	
2005–06	5	Reg. Pref.	8th	
2006–07	5	Pref. Aut.	3rd	
2007–08	5	Pref. Aut.	1st	
2008–09	4	3ª	20th	
2009–10	5	Pref. Aut.	12th	
2010–11	5	Pref. Aut.	10th	
2011–12	5	Pref. Aut.	16th	
2012–13	6	1ª Aut.	6th	
2013–14	6	1ª Aut.	11th	
2014–15	6	1ª Aut.	11th	
2015–16	6	1ª Aut.	7th	
2016–17	6	1ª Gal.	9th	
2017–18	6	1ª Gal.	6th	
2018–19	6	1ª Gal.	6th	
2019–20	5	Pref.	18th	
2020–21	5	Pref.	1st	
2021–22	6	Pref.	1st	N/A (Note: Second reserve team of Celta.)
2022–23	5	3ª Fed.	10th	N/A
2023–24	5	3ª Fed.	2nd	N/A

Season	Tier	Division	Place	Copa del Rey
2024–25	5	3ª Fed.	11th	
2025–26	5	3ª Fed.	6th	
2026–27	5	3ª Fed.		

- 39 seasons in Tercera División
- 5 seasons in Tercera Federación

== Famous players ==
- (Spain) Javier Falagán
- (Spain) Fer López
- (Spain) Nacho (youth)
- (Spain) Borja Oubiña (youth)
- (Spain) Roberto Lago (youth)
