= Agustín Abadía =

Spanish footballer

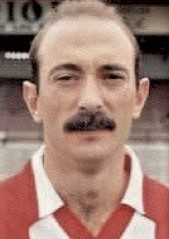
- Abadía with Atlético Madrid

Personal information
- Full name: Agustín Abadía Plana
- Date of birth: 15 April 1962 (age 64)
- Place of birth: Binéfar, Spain
- Height: 1.74 m (5 ft 9 in)
- Position: Midfielder

Youth career
- Binéfar

Senior career*
Years	Team	Apps	(Gls)
1980–1985	Binéfar	136	(11)
1982–1983	→ Conquense (loan)	23	(1)
1985–1989	CD Logroñés	114	(8)
1989–1990	Atlético Madrid	15	(0)
1990–1993	CD Logroñés	94	(7)
1993–1996	Compostela	87	(4)
1996–1997	Binéfar	17	(2)
1997	CD Logroñés	22	(1)
1997–1999	Binéfar	67	(6)
Total		575	(40)

Managerial career
- 1999: Binéfar (youth)
- 1999–2001: Binéfar
- 2002: CD Logroñés
- 2002–2003: CD Logroñés (youth)
- 2003: CD Logroñés
- 2003–2004: Girona
- 2008: CD Logroñés
- 2008–2009: Calahorra
- 2011–2014: SD Logroñés
- * Club domestic league appearances and goals

Agustín Abadía Plana (Spanish pronunciation: [aɣusˈtin aβaˈði.a ˈplana]; born 15 April 1962) is a Spanish former professional football left midfielder and manager.

His 19-year having been based in hard work, he totalled 244 La Liga matches and 14 goals over nine seasons. He was closely associated with CD Logroñés, serving the club in several capacities and in two of its denominations.

In 1999, Abadía started working as a manager.

== Playing career ==
Born in Binéfar, Province of Huesca, Aragon, Tato Abadía made his senior debut with local CD Binéfar. After two consecutive Tercera División championships, he helped the side be promoted to Segunda División B for the first time in its history, in 1983.

Two years later, Abadía signed for CD Logroñés in the Segunda División, scoring three goals in 33 matches in 1986–87 as the Riojans reached La Liga for the first time, and helped them retain their league status the following two years, being an important first-team member. In the summer of 1989 he joined Atlético Madrid, but returned to his previous club after only one season.

Abadía helped modest Logroñés consecutively remain in the top flight from 1990 to 1993, netting a career-best – both in the league and as a professional – five goals in the 1992–93 campaign, two of those coming on 14 March 1993 as the team came from behind 2–0 at the Santiago Bernabéu Stadium to draw 2–2 against Real Madrid. He moved to SD Compostela aged 31, and achieved another first-ever promotion in his career in his first year, with the Galician side reaching the top tier after finishing third and promoting in the playoffs against Rayo Vallecano, with the player taking part in all 270 minutes in the tie (two games and a third after the teams drew 1–1 on aggregate).

Having appeared only in 14 league games in 1995–96 (three starts), the 34-year-old Abadía returned to Logroñés, but this time could not help prevent his main club's top-division relegation. He closed out his career with Binéfar in 1999.

== Coaching career ==
Abadía started coaching with his last club, first at youth level, then successfully leading the team into safety in two consecutive third-tier seasons. He started 2002–03 with Logroñés' juniors, but was promoted to the main squad for the second division promotion playoffs, eventually falling short.

Abadía then managed Girona FC in division three, being dismissed after the seventh round of the 2004–05 campaign, which ended in relegation. Subsequently, he returned to Logroñés, and in the following years acted as both manager (youth and seniors) and director of football.

In late January 2011, after one year with CD Calahorra in the fourth division – fourth position, no playoff promotion– Abadía signed for another team in that league, SD Logroñés (Club Deportivo had already folded due to severe economical problems).
