= Teka =

German manufacturer of home appliances

Teka Group
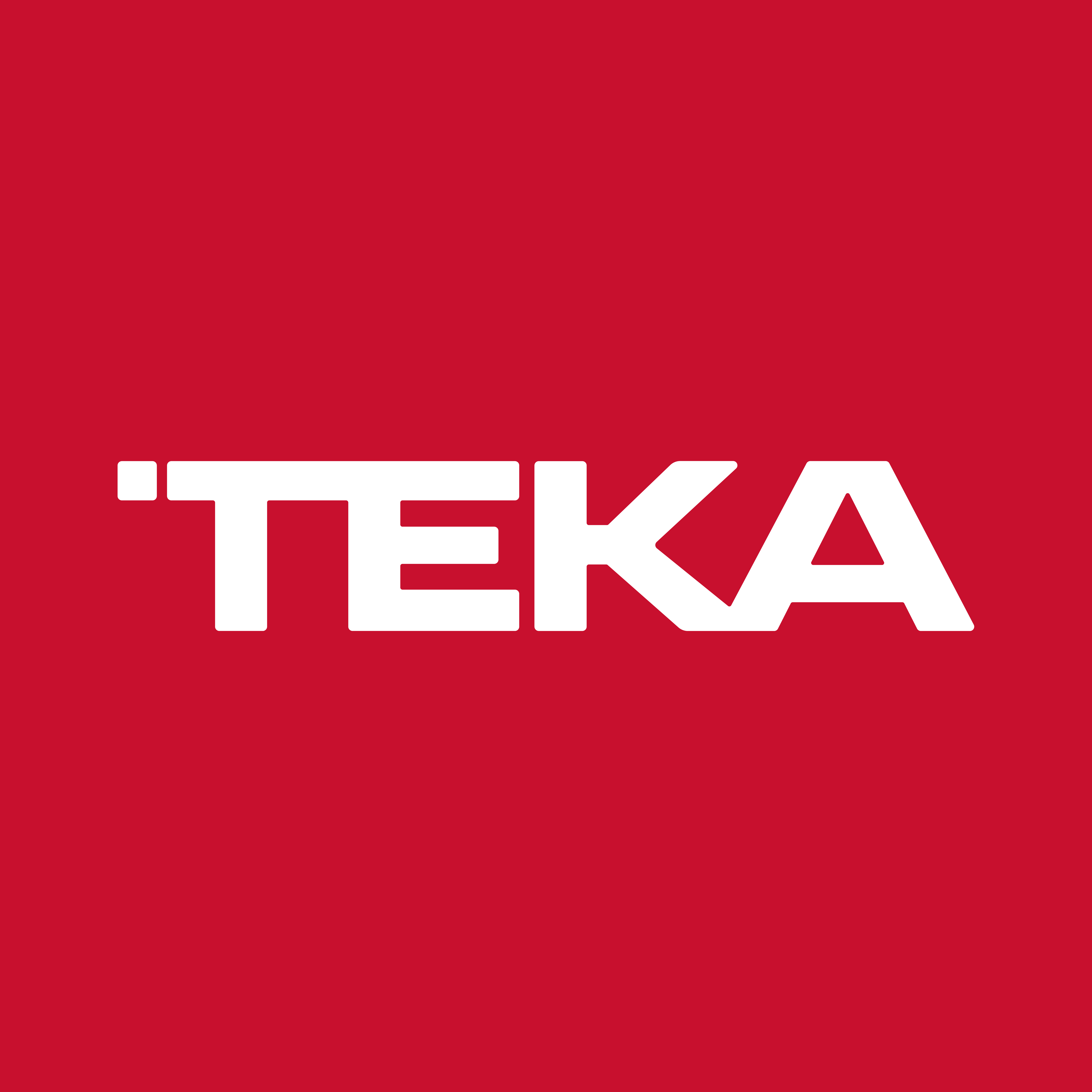
- Type: Subsidiary
- Industry: Home appliances
- Founded: 1924; Gelsenkirchen, Germany
- Founder: Karl Thielmann
- Headquarters: Santander, Spain; Zug, Switzerland
- Number of locations: 56 worldwide
- Area served: Worldwide
- Key people: Arturo Baldasano, Chairman of Teka Industrial, S.A. Mauro Correia, CEO of Teka Appliances Group
- Products: Ovens, microwaves, hoods, gas cooktops, induction and glass-ceramic hobs. Refrigerators, freezers, washing machines, dryers, sinks, dishwashers, wine coolers, kitchen taps and kitchen accessories.
- Number of employees: 4,700
- Parent: Midea Group (100%)
- Divisions: Kitchen
- Website: www.teka.com

The Teka Group is a multinational company founded in Germany in 1924 and engaged in the manufacture and commercialisation of kitchen products. It specializes in sinks, exhaust hoods, hobs (also known as stovetops or cooktops) and ovens. The group has 14 factories in Europe, the Americas and Asia and commercializes its products in 116 countries. The company has a workforce of 4,700 employees worldwide. Its products range from sinks and taps to ovens, induction hobs, extractor hoods and washing machines, among other electrical appliances.

Teka Group was acquired and is wholly owned by the Chinese company Midea Group. The terms of the acquisition were not disclosed to the public and the russian subsidiary, Teka Rus LLC, was excluded from the deal.

Arturo Baldasano is the Chairman of Teka Industrial, S.A. Mauro Correia is the CEO of Teka Appliances Group.

== Expansion ==
Since Teka set up in Spain in 1964, the group has expanded from Europe to the five continents. At the end of 2013, Peru became the 33rd country to have its own Teka offices. Years earlier, it began making inroads in China where it now has a presence in several cities such as Kaiping, Weihai, and Shanghai. The Teka Group is growing rapidly in Asia through its subsidiaries in Thailand, Indonesia, Malaysia, Singapore, China and Vietnam; in the Middle East, from its base in the Arab Emirates; Turkey and South America. It has launched a development plan in Africa, which includes both Maghreb and the south of the continent. In 2016 the Teka brand was relaunched in Australia and New Zealand through a partnership with local distributor Residentia Group.

The group's sales in Europe account for 80% of its turnover, followed by the Americas and the Asia-Pacific region.

== Activities ==
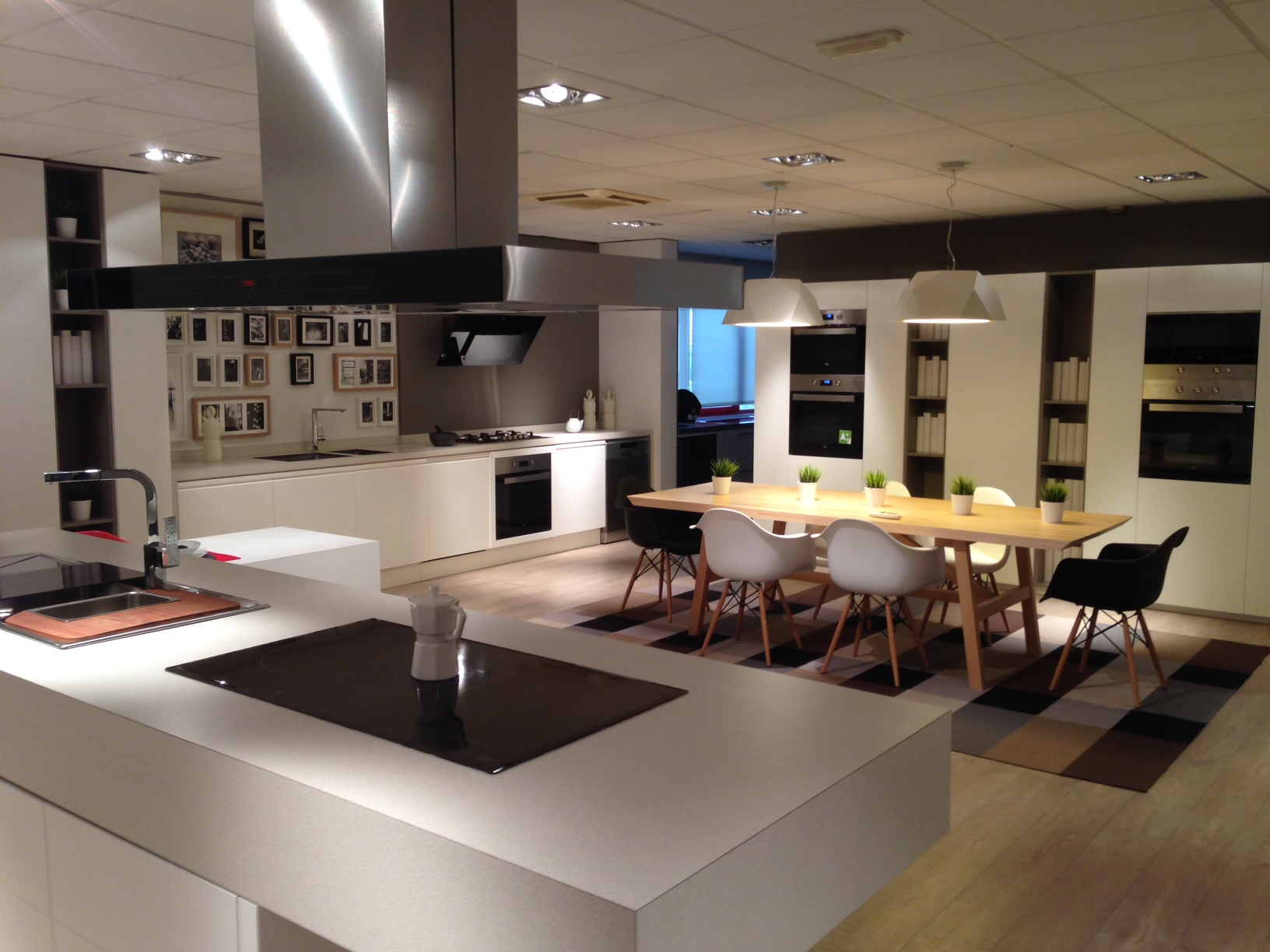
Teka showroom

Teka Group activity is mainly based on kitchen and bath areas.

The company manufactures induction cooktops, glass-ceramic hobs, gas cooktops, ovens, microwaves and extractor hoods. It also produces and distributes kitchen and bathroom taps and bathroom fittings for public facilities and homes. The Teka Group commercializes its products under the brands Teka, Küppersbusch, Mofém, Thor and Vitrogar.

== Main companies ==
Teka Group is the multinational's largest company. Since its early stages, its production has focused mainly on the manufacture of stainless steel sinks, kitchens, ovens and extractor hoods. One of Teka's most important business areas is in the "White Goods Line", which refers to kitchen-related electrical appliances such as washing machines, refrigerators, freezers and dishwashers, among others. Since the outset, Teka has committed to integrating electrical appliances into kitchen furniture, a practice known as built-in or fitted kitchens. It has factories in Germany, Spain, Gafanha da Encarnação (Portugal), Italy, Scandinavia, Hungary, Mexico, Venezuela, Turkey, Indonesia and China.

Through its Vitrogar brand name, it enamel-coats both ovens and glass ceramic hobs, and is a noted supplier of ceramic glazed parts for cooling thermal power plants. It has factories in Weihai, China.

The company's Intra division is of Scandinavian origin, and manufactures sinks, sanitary components and stainless steel accessories for kitchens and bathrooms. It was founded in 1870. The company started designing and manufacturing washing sinks in stainless steel, and changed its name to Intra in the 1970s. The company expanded to kitchen products as well as other bathroom products, and hired industrial designers. In the 1980s it moved to Storsand in Malvik. The owners also bought a Swedish and a Danish company, creating the Intra Group. Intra's products are characterized by their unique design and are sold worldwide, though its main markets are in Norway, Sweden and Denmark.

Küppersbusch is a kitchen brand founded in 1875 by Friedrich Küppersbusch. It manufactures and sells electrical appliances for domestic kitchens. Its main service area is central Europe.

Strohm, founded in 2018, is an important provider of high-quality, design-oriented fittings for bathrooms. The company, spun off from the TEKA Group beginning of 2020, employs more than 500 employees worldwide. The diverse product range is manufactured in the two Strohm production facilities in Hungary and China and sold in over 50 countries on 4 continents.

== Sports sponsorship ==
The Teka Group sponsors Racing de Santander, the first Spanish football team to have advertising on their uniforms. The company sponsored Real Madrid for eight years, during which time the team won two UEFA Champions Leagues and one Intercontinental Cup. It also sponsored the CB Cantabria handball team, the Teka Cycling Sports Group and in the Teka Suzuki Motocross Team. For several years, it also sponsored the World MX1 Motocross Championship.

In 2010, it was a sponsor in the second edition of the Barcelona World Race with a yacht that came second in a non-stop regatta for two crew members worldwide. The company also sponsors polo and motor racing (2013 Dakar Rally), both in Chile. It was a sponsor at the 2014 Winter Olympics in Sochi supporting the Hungarian two-time medal winner Imre Pulai in the luge event.

=== Real Madrid Basket ===
Teka restarted its support of Real Madrid on 1 July 2014 by signing a sponsorship deal with Real Madrid Baloncesto for the following three seasons. Teka, who had been previously connected to the club having won major titles such as Euroleague 1995, 3 Spanish leagues, 1 Copa del Rey and 1 European cup, added to its previous wins the Endesa Super Cup 2014, when Real beat FC Barcelona Basquet 99-78.

== Artistic sponsorships ==
Since 2020, Teka sponsors the tour Gastronomy at the Thyssen-Bornemisza Museum in Madrid, composed of 17 works ranging from the 15th to the 20th century and representing gastronomy as a source of pleasure and emotions. In addition, Teka is present as a sponsor in one of the main museums of Modern Art in Latin America (the MAMBA). During 2019 and 2020, Teka has sponsored different modern art exhibitions, by artists such as Sergio De Loof, Alberto Greco or Lea Lublin.

Since 2019, Teka is the main sponsor of the European Museum of Modern Art, located in the heart of the Born district of Barcelona, where it carries out an active cultural dissemination through activities such as art exhibitions, shows or concerts.
