= Nacho (footballer, born 1967) =

Spanish footballer (born 1967)

Personal information
- Full name: José Ignacio Fernández Palacios
- Date of birth: 3 February 1967 (age 59)
- Place of birth: Foz, Spain
- Height: 1.75 m (5 ft 9 in)
- Position: Left-back

Youth career
- 1984–1986: Gran Peña

Senior career*
Years	Team	Apps	(Gls)
1986–1992	Celta	127	(1)
1992–2001	Compostela	199	(4)
Total		326	(5)

International career
2005	Galicia	1	(0)

Managerial career
- 2010–2011: Cerceda
- 2011–2015: Órdenes
- 2017: Alondras
- 2017–2018: Negreira
- 2022–2023: Estradense
- * Club domestic league appearances and goals

José Ignacio Fernández Palacios (born 3 February 1967), known as Nacho, is a Spanish former professional footballer who played as a left-back.

His entire career was associated to Celta and Compostela. He appeared in 198 La Liga matches over eight seasons, scoring four goals.

== Club career ==
Born in Foz, Province of Lugo, Nacho spent his entire career in his native Galicia. He signed in 1986 with RC Celta de Vigo from amateurs Gran Peña FC, making his first-team debut in the Segunda División and contributing 20 games (15 starts) as the club promoted to La Liga.

Nacho played his first match in the top flight on 6 September 1987, featuring ten minutes in a 3–3 home draw against Valencia CF and finishing the season with 18 appearances in an eventual seventh-place finish. He continued to be regularly used the following years, being relegated in 1990 but winning promotion in 1992, even though he was only a fringe player in the latter campaign.

In the summer of 1992, Nacho joined SD Compostela of the second tier, playing 20 games in his second year in a first-ever promotion to the top division. From 1995 to 1998 he made an average of 35 league appearances, with the team being relegated at the end of 1997–98.

Nacho spent three more seasons with Compostela, totalling only 23 matches and suffering relegation in 2001, although he made no appearances in his last year. He retired in June 2001, at the age of 34.

== International career ==
In 1995, Spain manager Javier Clemente thought of Nacho as Sergi Barjuán's backup for the UEFA Euro 1996 tournament, and told the media that he would be called-up for the national team's next game. In an interview to El País, the player stated he had no desire to be selected, saying he did not "relate" to the cause. Since such an action was punishable with a one-year ban, the manager decided not to pick him after phoning him to make sure of his position, and his place would be eventually occupied by former Celta teammate and fellow Galician Jorge Otero.

Nacho finally represented Galicia in 2005, appearing against Uruguay at the Estadio Multiusos de San Lázaro.
