= Javier Falagán =

Spanish footballer and coach

Personal information
- Full name: Francisco Javier Falagán Hernández
- Date of birth: 4 October 1969 (age 57)
- Place of birth: Valladolid, Spain
- Height: 1.81 m (5 ft 11 1/2 in)
- Position: Goalkeeper

Youth career
- 1983–1986: Valladolid
- 1986–1987: Celta

Senior career*
Years	Team	Apps	(Gls)
1986–1988	Gran Peña		
1986–1987	→ Coruxo (loan)		
1988–1991	Sevilla B	1	(0)
1988–1989	→ Getafe (loan)	2	(0)
1990–1991	→ Fuengirola (loan)	30	(0)
1991–1993	Hércules	64	(0)
1993–1994	Valencia	0	(0)
1993–1994	→ Hércules (loan)	36	(0)
1994–1997	Compostela	61	(0)
1997–1998	Hércules	37	(0)
1998–2000	Mérida	9	(0)
Total		240	(0)

Managerial career
- 2018: Boiro
- * Club domestic league appearances and goals

Francisco Javier Falagán Hernández (born 4 October 1969) is a Spanish retired footballer who played as a goalkeeper, and is the goalkeeping coach of Extremadura UD.

== Football career ==
Born in Valladolid, Castile and León, Falagán played in the lower leagues until 1993, when he represented Hércules CF in Segunda División loaned by neighbouring Valencia CF. Whilst with the former club, he had already won promotion to that tier in 1993.

In 1995–96, Falagán played all 42 matches in La Liga with SD Compostela, his solid performances earning him a place in Javier Clemente's shortlist for UEFA Euro 1996 as one of the five goalkeepers. In the following season he appeared significantly less, but still managed to be the most used player in his position as the Galicians again retained their league status.

Falagán played three more seasons in the second level, with Hércules and CP Mérida. He retired at the end of the 1999–2000 campaign at the age of only 30, due to injury.

Falagán later worked as a goalkeeper coach, with Porriño CF, CD Casablanca, Gran Peña FC, Coruxo FC and Extremadura UD. He then continued coaching goalkeepers at Chinese club Guangzhou Evergrande.
