= Juan Viedma (footballer) =

Dutch footballer

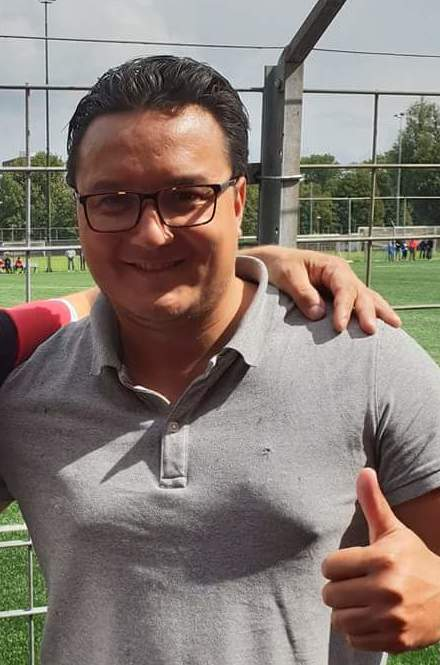
- Viedma in 2018

Personal information
- Full name: Juan José Viedma Schenkhuizen
- Date of birth: 27 October 1974 (age 52)
- Place of birth: Heemskerk, Netherlands
- Height: 1.87 m (6 ft 1 1/2 in)
- Positions: Defensive midfielder; centre back

Youth career
- Telstar
- Ajax

Senior career*
Years	Team	Apps	(Gls)
1994–1996	NEC	31	(1)
1996–2001	Compostela	92	(5)
2001–2005	RBC	64	(1)
2005–2007	Omniworld	45	(2)
Total		232	(9)
- * Club domestic league appearances and goals

Juan José Viedma Schenkhuizen (born 27 October 1974), known as Viedma, is a Dutch former footballer who played as a defensive midfielder or a central defender.

== Club career ==
Viedma was born in Heemskerk, North Holland. During his career, the son of a Spanish immigrant represented in his country NEC Nijmegen, RBC Roosendaal (promoting to the Eredivisie in his debut season) and FC Omniworld, still playing afterwards with VV Katwijk and FC Uitgeest at amateur level; both major divisions combined, he appeared in 140 matches and scored four times.

During five years, Viedma competed in his ancestor's homeland with SD Compostela, amassing La Liga totals of 41 games and two goals in his first two seasons. The rest was spent in the second tier, being used almost exclusively as a backup.
