= Paco Llorente =

Spanish footballer

Personal information
- Full name: Francisco Llorente Gento
- Date of birth: 21 May 1965 (age 61)
- Place of birth: Valladolid, Spain
- Height: 1.80 m (5 ft 11 in)
- Position: Winger

Youth career
- 1982: Urbis
- 1983: Real Madrid
- 1984–1985: Móstoles

Senior career*
Years	Team	Apps	(Gls)
1985–1986	Atlético Madrileño	31	(5)
1986–1987	Atlético Madrid	29	(3)
1987–1994	Real Madrid	105	(6)
1995–1998	Compostela	72	(2)
Total		237	(16)

International career
1986	Spain U21	5	(0)
1986–1987	Spain U23	3	(0)
1987	Spain	1	(1)
- * Club domestic league appearances and goals

Francisco "Paco" Llorente Gento (born 21 May 1965) is a Spanish former professional footballer who played mostly as a right winger.

He amassed La Liga totals of 206 games and 11 goals over the course of 13 seasons, with Atlético Madrid, Real Madrid and Compostela.

== Club career ==
Llorente was born in Valladolid, Castile and León. Following a brief youth spell at Real Madrid he signed with neighbours Atlético Madrid, being fairly used over two seasons. In summer 1987, he re-joined Real.

Also being able to appear as a forward, Llorente found it difficult to break into the starting XI, with Míchel preferred in his natural position and Hugo Sánchez and Emilio Butragueño up front. His moment of glory came during the second leg of the second round of the 1987–88 European Cup with Madrid facing elimination at FC Porto, as he appeared from the bench to provide two assists for Míchel after powerful flank runs which evoked memories of his uncle Francisco Gento, star winger of the 1950s and 60s.

In 1989–90, after the arrival of John Toshack as coach, Llorente found his playing time drastically cut; in his later years with the club, with Benito Floro at the helm, he even saw some time as right-back. He retired in 1998 after four top-flight seasons with lowly SD Compostela, aged 33.

== International career ==
Llorente played once for Spain, against Albania for the UEFA Euro 1988 qualifiers on 18 November 1987, scoring once in a 5–0 win in Seville. He did not make the cut for the final stages in West Germany, however.

== Personal life ==
Llorente hailed from a sporting family. Other than his uncle, his three brothers were also professionals: José Luis (1959) and Antonio "Toñín" (1963) played top-level basketball for well more than one decade (including at Real Madrid), while the youngest, Julio, made nearly 400 overall official appearances during his career as a defender, coinciding with Paco at Real from 1988 to 1990.

The nephew of legendary Real Madrid footballer Gento, his son Marcos also played for the club. His father-in-law Ramón Grosso did the same.

== Honours ==
Real Madrid

- La Liga: 1987–88, 1988–89, 1989–90
- Copa del Rey: 1989–90, 1992–93
- Supercopa de España: 1988, 1993
