= Javier Bellido =

Spanish footballer

Personal information
- Full name: Javier Bellido Plaza
- Date of birth: 9 March 1966 (age 60)
- Place of birth: Bilbao, Spain
- Height: 1.78 m (5 ft 10 in)
- Position: Centre-back

Youth career
- Padura
- 1984–1985: Athletic Bilbao

Senior career*
Years	Team	Apps	(Gls)
1985–1988	Bilbao Athletic	64	(4)
1985–1986	→ Amorebieta (loan)		
1988–1989	Eibar	28	(4)
1989–1991	Elche	61	(3)
1991–2001	Compostela	337	(25)
Total		490	(36)
- * Club domestic league appearances and goals

Javier Bellido Plaza (born 9 March 1966) is a Spanish former professional footballer who played as a central defender.

He played 353 matches in the Segunda División over 11 seasons (24 goals) in representation of four teams, also appearing for Compostela in La Liga.

== Club career ==
Bellido was born in Bilbao, Biscay. A product of Athletic Bilbao's famous Lezama youth academy, he spent the majority of his career at SD Compostela, where he earned the nickname 'The wall of San Lázaro'. Previously, he played five seasons in the Segunda División with Bilbao Athletic (two years), SD Eibar and Elche CF (two), and started his ten-year spell with the Galicians in the same league.

In the 1997–98 campaign, in spite of Compos' relegation from La Liga after four years up, Bellido scored seven league goals, second-best in the squad. He retired in July 2001 at the age of 35, as the team had been relegated to Segunda División B.

Subsequently, Bellido worked as youth system coordinator at his main club. He left his post on 16 June 2017.
