= 2004 Segunda División B play-offs =

Spanish football league play-offs

The 2004 Segunda División B play-offs (Playoffs de Ascenso or Promoción de Ascenso) were the final playoffs for promotion from 2003–04 Segunda División B to the 2004–05 Segunda División. The four first placed teams in each of the four Segunda División B groups played the Playoffs de Ascenso and the four last placed teams in Segunda División were relegated to Segunda División B.

The teams play a league of four teams, divided into 4 groups. The champion of each group is promoted to Segunda División.

== Group A ==
=== League table ===
Pos	Team	Pld	W	D	L	GF	GA	GD	Pts	Promotion or relegation
1	UE Lleida (P)	6	3	3	0	7	2	+5	12	Promotion to Segunda División
2	Cultural Leonesa	6	3	2	1	17	9	+8	11	
3	Celta Vigo B	6	1	3	2	9	13	−4	6	
4	Pájara Playas de Jandía	6	0	2	4	5	14	−9	2	

Source: arquero-arba
Rules for classification: 1st points; 2nd head-to-head points; 3rd head-to-head goal difference; 4th head-to-head goals scored; 5th goal difference; 6th number of goals scored
(P) Promoted

=== Results ===
Home \ Away	LLE	CLE	CEL	PAJ
UE Lleida		1–0	3–0	0–0
Cultural Leonesa	1–1		3–0	6–1
Celta Vigo B	1–1	4–4		1–1
Pájara Playas de Jandía	0–1	2–3	1–3	

Source: arquero-arba
Legend: Blue = home team win; Yellow = draw; Red = away team win.

== Group B ==
=== League table ===
Pos	Team	Pld	W	D	L	GF	GA	GD	Pts	Promotion or relegation
1	Pontevedra (P)	6	3	2	1	9	4	+5	11	Promotion to Segunda División
2	CD Mirandés	6	2	2	2	6	8	−2	8	
3	CD Badajoz	6	2	1	3	7	6	+1	7	
4	Lorca Deportiva	6	2	1	3	5	9	−4	7	

Source: arquero-arba
Rules for classification: 1st points; 2nd head-to-head points; 3rd head-to-head goal difference; 4th head-to-head goals scored; 5th goal difference; 6th number of goals scored
(P) Promoted

=== Results ===
Home \ Away	PON	MIR	BAD	LOR
Pontevedra		2–2	0–0	3–0
CD Mirandés	0–1		2–1	0–0
CD Badajoz	0–2	3–0		3–1
Lorca Deportiva	2–1	1–2	1–0	

Source: arquero-arba
Legend: Blue = home team win; Yellow = draw; Red = away team win.

== Group C ==
=== League table ===
Pos	Team	Pld	W	D	L	GF	GA	GD	Pts	Promotion or relegation
1	Racing Ferrol (P)	6	3	0	3	6	4	+2	9	Promotion to Segunda División
2	Sevilla FC B	6	2	2	2	6	5	+1	8	
3	CD Castellón	6	2	2	2	6	8	−2	8	
4	Atlético de Madrid B	6	1	4	1	3	4	−1	7	

Source: arquero-arba
Rules for classification: 1st points; 2nd head-to-head points; 3rd head-to-head goal difference; 4th head-to-head goals scored; 5th goal difference; 6th number of goals scored
(P) Promoted

=== Results ===
Home \ Away	RFE	SEV	CAS	AtmB
Racing Ferrol		0–1	3–1	2–0
Sevilla FC B	0–1		3–1	0–0
CD Castellón	1–0	2–1		1–1
Atlético de Madrid B	1–0	1–1	0–0	

Source: arquero-arba
Legend: Blue = home team win; Yellow = draw; Red = away team win.

== Group D ==
=== League table ===
Pos	Team	Pld	W	D	L	GF	GA	GD	Pts	Promotion or relegation
1	Gimnàstic de Tarragona (P)	6	3	2	1	7	7	0	11	Promotion to Segunda División
2	Real Madrid B	6	3	1	2	15	8	+7	10	
3	CD Ourense	6	2	1	3	9	13	−4	7	
4	UD Lanzarote	6	1	2	3	7	10	−3	5	

Source: arquero-arba
Rules for classification: 1st points; 2nd head-to-head points; 3rd head-to-head goal difference; 4th head-to-head goals scored; 5th goal difference; 6th number of goals scored
(P) Promoted

=== Results ===
Home \ Away	GTA	RMA	OUR	LAN
Gimnàstic de Tarragona		1–0	2–0	1–0
Real Madrid B	4–0		1–2	2–2
CD Ourense	2–2	2–5		2–1
UD Lanzarote	1–1	1–3	2–1	

Source: arquero-arba
Legend: Blue = home team win; Yellow = draw; Red = away team win.
