= 2000–01 Segunda División =

70th season of the second-tier football league in Spain

Segunda División
- Season: 2000–01
- Champions: Sevilla FC
- Promoted: Sevilla; Real Betis; CD Tenerife
- Relegated: SD Compostela; Universidad de Las Palmas CF; Getafe CF; UE Lleida
- Matches: 462
- Goals: 1,016 (2.2 per match)
- Top goalscorer: (Spain) Salva Ballesta

The 2000–01 Segunda División season saw 22 teams participate in the second flight Spanish league.

The teams that promoted to La Liga (top division) were Sevilla FC, Real Betis and CD Tenerife. The teams that relegated to Segunda División B were SD Compostela, Universidad de Las Palmas CF, Getafe CF and UE Lleida.

== Teams ==
Location of teams in Segunda División 2000-01
Canary Islands

Team	Home city	Stadium	Capacity
Albacete	Albacete	Carlos Belmonte	18,000
Atlético de Madrid	Madrid	Vicente Calderón	54,907
Badajoz	Badajoz	Nuevo Vivero	15,198
Real Betis	Seville	Manuel Ruíz de Lopera	52,132
Compostela	Santiago de Compostela	San Lázaro	12,000
Córdoba	Córdoba	Nuevo Arcángel	21,822
Eibar	Eibar	Ipurua	5,000
Elche	Elche	Martínez Valero	36,017
Extremadura	Almendralejo	Francisco de la Hera	11,580
Getafe	Getafe	Coliseum Alfonso Pérez	17,393
Leganés	Leganés	Butarque	8,138
Levante	Valencia	Ciutat de València	26,354
Lleida	Lleida	Camp d'Esports	13,500
Real Jaén	Jaén	La Victoria	11,500
Real Murcia	Murcia	La Condomina	16,000
Racing Ferrol	Ferrol	A Malata	12,024
Recreativo de Huelva	Huelva	Colombino	13,000
Salamanca	Villares de la Reina	Helmántico	17,341
Sevilla	Seville	Ramón Sánchez Pizjuán	45,500
Sporting de Gijón	Gijón	El Molinón	25,885
Tenerife	Santa Cruz de Tenerife	Heliodoro Rodríguez López	20,000
Universidad de Las Palmas	Las Palmas	Municipal de Maspalomas	6,000

=== Teams by Autonomous Community ===
	Autonomous community	Number of teams	Teams
1	Andalusia	5	Betis, Córdoba, Real Jaén, Recreativo, Sevilla
2	Madrid	3	Atlético Madrid, Getafe, Leganés
3	Canary Islands	2	Tenerife, Universidad de Las Palmas
3	Extremadura	2	Badajoz, Extremadura
3	Galicia	2	Compostela, Racing de Ferrol
3	Valencia	2	Elche, Levante
7	Asturias	1	Sporting
7	Basque Country	1	Eibar
7	Castile-La Mancha	1	Albacete
7	Castile and León	1	Salamanca
7	Catalonia	1	Lleida
7	Murcia	1	Murcia

== Final table ==
Pos	Team	Pld	W	D	L	GF	GA	GD	Pts	Promotion or relegation
1	Sevilla (C, P)	42	23	11	8	66	39	+27	80	Promotion to La Liga
2	Betis (P)	42	21	12	9	49	32	+17	75	Promotion to La Liga
3	Tenerife (P)	42	21	11	10	58	32	+26	74	Promotion to La Liga
4	Atlético Madrid	42	21	11	10	59	39	+20	74	
5	Albacete	42	18	12	12	46	40	+6	66	
6	Recreativo	42	15	20	7	45	29	+16	65	
7	Sporting Gijón	42	17	12	13	55	49	+6	63	
8	Levante	42	13	21	8	58	50	+8	60	
9	Salamanca	42	17	8	17	51	48	+3	59	
10	Real Jaén	42	15	14	13	37	40	−3	59	
11	Extremadura	42	16	10	16	42	46	−4	58	
12	Córdoba	42	14	14	14	40	43	−3	56	
13	Murcia	42	13	13	16	53	54	−1	52	
14	Badajoz	42	10	21	11	34	38	−4	51	
15	Eibar	42	11	17	14	30	32	−2	50	
16	Ferrol	42	12	14	16	46	50	−4	50	
17	Leganés	42	9	20	13	45	41	+4	47	
18	Elche	42	10	16	16	45	56	−11	46	
19	Compostela (R)	42	11	12	19	41	65	−24	45	Relegation to Segunda División B
20	Universidad de Las Palmas (R)	42	8	15	19	34	63	−29	39	Relegation to Segunda División B
21	Getafe (R)	42	8	11	23	42	65	−23	35	Relegation to Segunda División B
22	Lleida (R)	42	5	13	24	40	65	−25	28	Relegation to Segunda División B

Rules for classification: 1st points; 2nd head-to-head points; 3rd head-to-head goal difference; 4th head-to-head goals scored; 5th goal difference; 6th number of goals scored; 7th Fair-play points
(C) Champions; (P) Promoted; (R) Relegated

== Results ==
Home \ Away	ALB	ATM	BAD	BET	COM	CÓR	EIB	ELC	EXT	GET	LEG	LEV	LLE	RJA	MUR	RFE	REC	SAL	SEV	SPG	TEN	ULP
Albacete	—	0–1	1–1	0–0	2–0	0–0	1–3	2–0	2–1	2–1	0–0	1–1	2–1	2–1	2–1	1–0	0–2	1–0	2–1	3–1	1–0	2–3
Atlético	0–0	—	2–0	2–1	2–0	1–1	1–1	2–0	2–0	2–1	1–0	1–1	3–2	5–0	0–3	1–1	0–1	3–0	2–0	1–0	1–2	2–0
Badajoz	0–0	0–0	—	0–0	2–1	0–0	1–0	1–1	1–1	2–2	1–0	1–1	1–0	0–1	1–1	1–0	1–1	0–1	2–0	2–0	1–2	3–1
Real Betis	1–2	1–1	1–1	—	2–0	1–1	1–0	1–2	1–0	1–0	2–1	1–0	4–1	1–0	2–1	2–1	1–0	2–1	1–3	1–0	0–2	2–0
Compostela	0–2	2–3	0–1	0–0	—	0–1	2–1	1–1	3–2	1–1	1–1	1–1	2–1	0–0	2–0	0–5	2–0	2–1	0–2	1–2	0–2	0–0
Córdoba	1–4	1–1	2–0	1–0	0–0	—	2–0	0–1	2–0	4–1	1–1	1–1	3–0	1–0	1–3	0–1	1–3	1–1	0–1	2–0	1–0	2–1
Eibar	0–0	2–1	0–1	0–0	0–0	3–0	—	2–1	0–0	0–0	0–1	0–0	2–0	1–0	0–1	1–1	2–1	1–3	1–0	0–0	2–2	3–0
Elche	0–1	2–1	0–0	1–1	2–2	1–2	2–0	—	3–1	1–4	1–1	1–1	2–1	0–0	1–1	2–0	0–1	2–0	1–2	2–2	0–2	0–1
Extremadura	1–1	0–1	1–0	1–0	3–2	1–0	2–0	1–2	—	1–0	0–3	2–1	0–0	2–0	2–0	1–0	1–1	0–1	1–1	1–2	1–0	2–1
Getafe	1–1	0–1	2–1	0–2	0–3	0–0	0–0	1–1	0–1	—	0–1	1–2	2–1	0–1	4–0	1–2	0–1	1–2	0–1	3–1	0–5	0–0
Leganés	0–0	1–2	0–0	1–1	3–0	4–0	1–1	2–0	1–1	2–3	—	1–0	0–0	0–0	3–2	1–1	1–1	0–1	1–1	0–1	0–1	1–1
Levante	0–0	4–1	2–1	3–2	0–2	2–1	0–0	3–3	1–0	3–3	0–2	—	3–2	2–2	2–3	0–0	1–1	2–0	2–0	1–1	2–0	2–0
Lleida	1–2	1–1	1–1	0–1	1–2	2–0	0–0	1–1	2–2	1–2	1–0	3–3	—	5–2	0–1	0–1	0–0	0–3	0–1	0–1	1–1	4–2
Real Jaén	3–0	1–0	0–0	0–2	1–1	0–0	1–0	3–1	0–0	3–1	0–0	0–1	2–1	—	2–1	1–0	3–1	2–1	2–1	0–2	0–0	1–0
Murcia	2–0	1–1	0–0	1–3	2–0	0–0	1–0	0–1	1–3	2–1	2–2	2–0	0–0	2–2	—	1–1	2–0	1–2	1–1	5–0	0–1	1–1
Racing Ferrol	3–2	0–2	2–2	0–1	1–3	0–2	0–1	2–1	1–1	2–1	1–0	1–1	3–1	1–1	1–1	—	1–0	0–1	1–1	2–3	1–2	1–2
Recreativo	1–0	1–1	0–0	1–1	2–0	1–0	3–0	0–0	3–1	0–0	1–1	1–1	1–1	2–0	4–1	1–2	—	0–0	1–1	1–1	0–0	4–1
Salamanca	1–2	1–3	1–1	1–0	1–2	1–1	0–2	2–0	1–2	4–2	1–1	1–1	2–0	1–0	1–2	1–1	0–1	—	0–1	2–1	3–1	4–0
Sevilla	1–0	3–1	5–2	1–1	4–0	2–0	2–1	1–1	3–0	1–1	4–2	3–2	2–0	0–1	2–1	3–0	0–0	2–0	—	1–1	1–0	2–2
Sporting	4–2	1–0	1–0	1–2	5–2	2–2	0–0	2–1	2–0	3–1	2–2	1–2	1–2	1–0	2–2	1–1	0–1	2–0	3–0	—	0–0	0–0
Tenerife	1–0	1–2	3–0	0–1	4–0	3–0	0–0	3–1	0–2	3–0	3–2	1–1	3–2	1–1	1–0	1–1	1–1	1–1	1–2	1–0	—	2–0
Universidad LP	1–0	2–1	1–1	1–1	1–1	0–2	0–0	2–2	1–0	0–1	2–1	2–2	0–0	0–0	2–1	1–3	0–0	1–3	1–3	0–2	0–1	—

Source: BDFutbol
Legend: Blue = home team win; Yellow = draw; Red = away team win.
