= Franck Passi =

French footballer (born 1966)

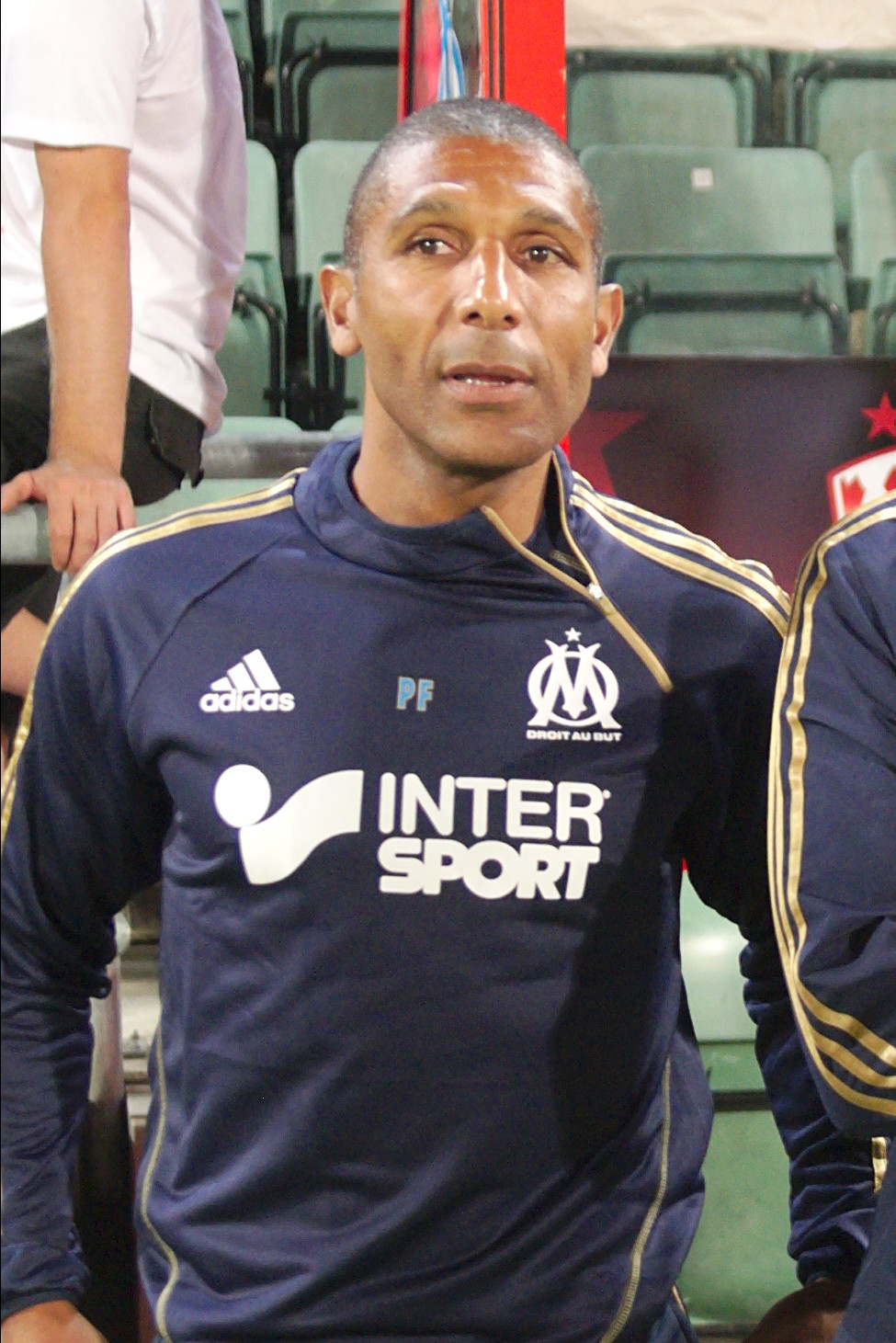
- Passi with Marseille in 2013

Personal information
- Date of birth: 28 March 1966 (age 60)
- Place of birth: Bergerac, France
- Position: Midfielder

Youth career
- 1980–1982: AS Béziers
- 1982–1983: Montpellier

Senior career*
Years	Team	Apps	(Gls)
1983–1986	Montpellier	87	(1)
1986–1988	Marseille	61	(3)
1988–1990	Toulouse	74	(2)
1990–1993	Toulon	84	(3)
1993–1994	Monaco	19	(0)
1994–1999	Compostela	179	(6)
1999–2001	Bolton Wanderers	38	(0)
Total		542	(15)

International career
1988	France U21		

Managerial career
- 2004: Compostela (caretaker)
- 2012–2016: Marseille (assistant)
- 2015: Marseille (caretaker)
- 2016: Marseille (caretaker)
- 2017: Lille (interim)
- 2018–2019: Monaco (assistant)
- 2019: Monaco (caretaker)
- 2020: Niort
- 2020–2022: Al-Rayyan (assistant)
- 2022–2024: Lyon (assistant)
- 2024–2025: Al-Ittihad (assistant)
- * Club domestic league appearances and goals

Franck Passi (born 28 March 1966) is a French football coach and former player.

== Coaching career ==
Passi worked in a player recruitment role for one of his old clubs, Marseille, between 2007 and 2010 before becoming reserve team coach at the club in May 2010. In 2012, he was promoted again, this time as assistant coach to Elie Baup. After the departure of Baup in December 2013, Passi continued his duties as assistant coach under José Anigo, as well as under Argentine coach Marcelo Bielsa.

In August 2015, after Bielsa left following defeat in the opening game of the season, Passi was appointed caretaker boss. In the one game of his tenure, his Ligue 1 debut away to Reims, the team lost 1–0.

On 19 April 2016, Bielsa's successor Míchel was sacked on the day before the Coupe de France semi-final against Sochaux, and Passi took temporary charge for the second time in the season. He won the game 1–0 through Florian Thauvin's goal. In the 2016 Coupe de France Final, the team lost 4–2 to Le Classique rivals Paris Saint-Germain. Passi saved Marseille from relegation and led the club for exactly six months until October 2016, when Rudi Garcia was hired as Míchel's replacement following the club's takeover by Frank McCourt.

In February 2017, Passi was named caretaker boss of fourth-from-bottom Lille, to pave the way for Bielsa's arrival in the summer. On 24 January 2019, Passi was named caretaker coach of Monaco, following the suspension of Thierry Henry. He oversaw the team for just one match, a 2–0 defeat to Dijon, before Leonardo Jardim was installed as permanent coach.

In January 2020, Passi was appointed as manager of Ligue 2 club Niort until the end of the season, following the departure of Pascal Plancque. He left at the end of the season, saying that he was preparing to be an assistant at Laurent Blanc's new project. In December 2020, he became Blanc's assistant manager at Al-Rayyan.

== Personal life ==
Passi comes from a family of footballers. His father, Camille Passi, was a Congolese footballer, and coach in his later career. His son, Bryan Passi, is a professional footballer who also played for Montpellier. His brother, Gérald Passi, was also a professional footballer who played for the France national football team.

== Managerial statistics ==
As of 20 May 2017

Managerial record by team and tenure
Team	Nat	From	To	Record							
Team	Nat	From	To	G	W	D	L	GF	GA	GD	Win %
Compostela (caretaker)	Spain	6 January 2004	12 January 2004	1	0	0	1	1	2	−1	0.00
Marseille (caretaker)	France	10 August 2015	18 August 2015	1	0	0	1	0	1	−1	0.00
Marseille (caretaker)	France	19 April 2016	19 October 2016	15	6	5	4	18	16	+2	40.00
Lille (interim)	France	14 February 2017	24 May 2017	15	7	2	6	20	18	+2	46.67
Monaco (caretaker)	France	24 January 2019	27 January 2019	1	0	0	1	0	2	–2	0.00
Total				33	13	7	13	39	39	+0	39.39
