= 1996–97 La Liga =

66th season of La Liga

La Liga
- Season: 1996–97
- Dates: 31 August 1996 – 23 June 1997
- Champions: Real Madrid; 27th title
- Relegated: Rayo Vallecano (relegation playoff); Extremadura; Sevilla; Hércules; Logroñes
- Champions League: Real Madrid; Barcelona
- Cup Winners' Cup: Real Betis (as Copa del Rey runners-up)
- UEFA Cup: Deportivo La Coruña; Atlético Madrid; Athletic Bilbao; Valladolid
- Matches: 462
- Goals: 1,271 (2.75 per match)
- Top goalscorer: Ronaldo (34 goals)
- Biggest home win: Barcelona 8–0 Logroñés (20 October 1996)
- Biggest away win: Rayo Vallecano 0–4 Real Betis (16 March 1997)
- Highest scoring: Barcelona 8–0 Logroñés (20 October 1996) Zaragoza 3–5 Barcelona (29 August 1996)

The 1996–97 La Liga season was the 66th since its establishment. It began on 31 August 1996, and concluded on 23 June 1997. Five clubs were relegated to the Segunda División at the end of the season, as the number of La Liga clubs was reduced to 20 starting from the following season. This was thus the last La Liga season played with 22 teams.

== Promotion and relegation ==
Teams promoted from 1995–96 Segunda División

- Hércules
- Logroñés
- Extremadura

Teams relegated to 1996–97 Segunda División

- Albacete
- Mérida
- Salamanca

== Team information ==
=== Clubs and locations ===
1996–97 season was composed of the following clubs:

Location of teams in La Liga 1996–97
Canary Islands

Team	Stadium	Capacity
Barcelona	Camp Nou	98,772
Real Madrid	Santiago Bernabéu	80,354
Atlético Madrid	Vicente Calderón	55,005
Valencia	Mestalla	55,000
Real Betis	Benito Villamarín	52,132
Sevilla	Ramón Sánchez Pizjuán	45,500
Espanyol	Sarrià	44,000
Athletic Bilbao	San Mamés	39,750
Deportivo de La Coruña	Riazor	34,600
Real Zaragoza	La Romareda	34,596
Celta de Vigo	Balaídos	32,500
Real Sociedad	Anoeta	32,200
Hércules	José Rico Pérez	29,500
Valladolid	José Zorrilla	27,846
Sporting de Gijón	El Molinón	25,885
Real Oviedo	Carlos Tartiere	23,500
Tenerife	Heliodoro Rodríguez López	22,824
Racing de Santander	El Sardinero	22,222
Logroñés	Las Gaunas	16,000
Rayo Vallecano	Vallecas	14,708
Compostela	San Lázaro	12,000
Extremadura	Francisco de la Hera	11,580

- It was the last season with 22 teams in La Liga. To reduce the number of teams in the league, the last four teams, CF Extremadura, Sevilla FC, Hércules CF and CD Logroñés, were relegated and the fifth-to-last team, Rayo Vallecano, played a relegation playoff and was also relegated.

=== Personnel and sponsoring ===
Team	Head coach	Captain	Kit manufacturer	Shirt sponsor
Athletic Bilbao	(France) Luis Fernández	(Spain) Genar Andrinúa	Kappa	None
Atlético Madrid	(Federal Republic of Yugoslavia) Radomir Antić	(Spain) Roberto Solozábal	Puma	Bandai/Tamagotchi
Barcelona	(England) Bobby Robson	(Romania) Gheorghe Popescu	Kappa	None
Betis	(Spain) Lorenzo Serra Ferrer	(Spain) Alexis Trujillo	Kappa	Ocaroil
Celta Vigo	(Spain) Fernando Castro Santos	(Spain) Patxi Salinas	Umbro	Citroën
Compostela	(Spain) Fernando Vázquez	(Spain) Javier Bellido	Zico	Escuris
Deportivo	(Brazil) Carlos Alberto Silva	(Spain) Francisco Javier González Pérez	Umbro	Feiraco
Espanyol	(Spain) Paco Flores	(Spain) Francisco Javier López Alfaro	Puma	Dani
Extremadura	(Spain) Iosu Ortoundo	(Spain) Juan Francisco Rodríguez Herrera	Kelme	Expo '98 Lisboa
Hércules	(Spain) Quique Hernández	(Spain) Francisco Gabriel Escudero Martínez	Rasán	Jijona
Logroñés	(Spain) Carlos Aimar	(Spain) Agustín Abadía	Rasán	La Rioja
Racing Santander	(Spain) Marcos Alonso Peña	(Spain) Jesús Merino Landaluce	Austral	Caja Cantabria
Rayo Vallecano	(Spain) Francisco García Gómez	(Spain) Jesús Diego Cota	Joma	Estepona
Oviedo	(Spain) José Antonio Novo	(Spain) Alberto Martínez Díaz	Joluvi	Cajastur
Real Madrid	(Italy) Fabio Capello	(Spain) Manolo Sanchís	Kelme	Teka
Real Sociedad	(Spain) Javier Irureta	(Spain) Lorenzo Juarros García	Astore	Krafft
Sevilla	(Spain) Vicente Miera	(Spain) Manuel Jiménez Jiménez	Umbro	None
Sporting de Gijón	(Spain) Benito Floro	(Spain) Juan Carlos Ablanedo	Joma	Cajastur
Tenerife	(Germany) Jupp Heynckes	(Spain) Felipe Miñambres	Puma	Canarias
Valencia	(Argentina) Jorge Valdano	(Spain) Andoni Zubizarreta	Luanvi	Ford
Valladolid	(Argentina) Vicente Cantatore	(Spain) Juan Carlos Rodríguez Moreno	Kelme	Caja España
Zaragoza	(Uruguay) Víctor Espárrago	(Spain) Alberto Belsué	Adidas	Pikolin

== League table ==
Pos	Team	Pld	W	D	L	GF	GA	GD	Pts	Qualification or relegation
1	Real Madrid (C)	42	27	11	4	85	36	+49	92	Qualification for the Champions League group stage
2	Barcelona	42	28	6	8	102	48	+54	90	Qualification for the Champions League second qualifying round
3	Deportivo La Coruña	42	21	14	7	57	30	+27	77 (Note: BET 1–2 DEP; DEP 3–0 BET)	Qualification for the UEFA Cup first round
4	Real Betis	42	21	14	7	81	46	+35	77	Qualification for the Cup Winners' Cup first round (Note: Since Barcelona, winners of 1996–97 Copa del Rey, was qualified for the 1997–98 UEFA Champions League, losing cup finalists Real Betis earned a spot in the first round of the 1997–98 UEFA Cup Winners' Cup.)
5	Atlético Madrid	42	20	11	11	76	64	+12	71	Qualification for the UEFA Cup first round
6	Athletic Bilbao	42	16	16	10	72	57	+15	64 (Note: VLD 0–0 ATH; ATH 0–0 VLD)	Qualification for the UEFA Cup first round
7	Valladolid	42	18	10	14	57	46	+11	64	Qualification for the UEFA Cup first round
8	Real Sociedad	42	18	9	15	50	47	+3	63	
9	Tenerife	42	15	11	16	69	57	+12	56 (Note: VAL 2–1 TEN; TEN 2–1 VAL)	
10	Valencia	42	15	11	16	63	59	+4	56	
11	Compostela	42	13	14	15	52	65	−13	53	
12	Espanyol	42	14	9	19	51	57	−6	51	
13	Racing Santander	42	11	17	14	52	54	−2	50 (Note: RAC: 9 pts; ZAR: 6 pts; SPG: 3 pts)	
14	Zaragoza	42	12	14	16	58	66	−8	50	
15	Sporting Gijón	42	13	11	18	45	63	−18	50	
16	Celta Vigo	42	12	13	17	51	54	−3	49	
17	Oviedo	42	12	12	18	49	65	−16	48	
18	Rayo Vallecano (R)	42	13	6	23	43	62	−19	45	Qualification for the relegation playoffs
19	Extremadura (R)	42	11	11	20	35	64	−29	44	Relegation to the Segunda División
20	Sevilla (R)	42	12	7	23	50	69	−19	43	Relegation to the Segunda División
21	Hércules (R)	42	12	5	25	40	77	−37	41	Relegation to the Segunda División
22	Logroñés (R)	42	9	6	27	33	85	−52	33	Relegation to the Segunda División

Source: LFP
Rules for classification: 1) points; 2) head-to-head points; 3) head-to-head goal difference; 4) head-to-head goals scored; 5) goal difference; 6) number of goals scored.
(C) Champions; (R) Relegated

== Results ==
Home \ Away	ATH	ATM	BAR	BET	CEL	COM	DEP	ESP	EXT	HÉR	LOG	RAC	RVA	RMA	ROV	RSO	SEV	SPG	TEN	VAL	VLD	ZAR
Athletic Bilbao		1–1	2–1	0–3	2–2	2–2	1–0	2–2	0–0	5–0	6–0	2–2	3–2	1–0	3–2	1–3	0–0	4–0	2–0	2–0	0–0	2–2
Atlético Madrid	2–1		2–5	2–2	2–0	4–1	0–2	2–1	1–1	3–0	2–0	1–0	1–3	1–4	3–0	2–2	3–2	2–1	0–3	1–4	3–1	5–1
FC Barcelona	2–0	3–3		3–0	1–0	3–0	1–0	2–1	3–0	2–3	8–0	1–0	6–0	1–0	2–2	3–2	4–0	4–0	1–1	3–2	6–1	4–1
Betis	3–0	3–2	2–4		1–1	0–0	1–2	1–2	3–1	2–1	5–1	2–2	3–0	1–1	4–0	2–1	3–3	0–1	3–1	1–1	2–0	2–2
Celta de Vigo	0–2	1–1	1–3	0–2		1–2	1–1	2–2	0–1	3–0	4–0	1–1	2–0	4–0	3–1	1–1	4–2	2–1	3–1	1–1	0–2	0–0
SD Compostela	1–1	3–1	1–5	0–2	2–1		0–0	3–1	4–0	2–2	1–2	1–1	2–1	1–2	0–2	1–2	2–0	2–1	1–1	0–3	1–1	2–1
Deportivo de La Coruña	2–2	0–0	0–1	3–0	2–2	1–0		2–0	1–0	4–0	4–1	2–1	1–1	1–1	3–0	1–0	3–0	0–0	0–0	1–0	0–2	1–0
RCD Espanyol	0–2	0–0	2–0	0–0	0–0	0–2	0–1		5–1	2–1	5–1	0–0	0–0	0–2	2–0	3–0	1–0	2–3	1–0	3–2	1–0	3–0
CF Extremadura	1–2	2–4	1–3	0–3	2–0	1–1	1–0	3–0		0–0	3–0	1–2	1–0	0–0	0–2	1–0	0–1	1–2	2–0	1–0	1–1	2–1
Hércules CF	3–2	0–2	2–1	0–1	0–2	1–0	1–3	1–2	2–1		1–0	0–1	1–0	2–3	1–1	2–1	3–0	1–1	3–1	0–2	1–0	1–1
CD Logroñés	1–4	0–3	0–1	2–1	0–3	1–1	1–2	1–0	0–0	3–2		1–1	0–2	0–2	1–1	1–0	2–0	0–2	0–1	2–1	0–1	1–2
Racing de Santander	1–2	1–1	1–1	1–1	1–0	2–2	1–1	1–1	2–3	1–2	2–1		1–2	2–2	1–0	1–2	1–4	2–0	1–2	3–2	2–0	1–2
Rayo Vallecano	1–1	1–2	1–2	0–4	3–0	0–1	1–2	0–1	3–0	2–1	1–0	0–0		1–0	2–2	1–0	2–0	0–1	1–2	3–1	1–2	1–1
Real Madrid	1–0	3–1	2–0	2–2	4–0	0–0	3–2	2–0	5–0	3–0	0–0	2–1	1–0		6–1	6–1	4–2	3–1	0–0	4–2	1–0	2–0
Real Oviedo	2–0	4–1	2–4	1–1	2–1	2–2	0–1	3–1	0–0	2–0	2–1	1–5	0–2	2–3		0–0	1–0	0–0	1–3	3–0	1–1	1–0
Real Sociedad	0–0	1–1	2–0	0–1	1–2	4–1	1–1	1–0	3–0	2–1	2–1	2–0	3–1	1–2	1–0		1–0	1–1	3–0	0–1	0–0	1–0
Sevilla FC	4–2	0–0	0–1	0–3	2–0	0–1	0–1	3–1	0–0	5–0	1–4	0–0	2–0	1–3	2–1	2–3		2–1	2–1	0–2	2–2	1–2
Sporting de Gijón	2–4	0–1	0–0	2–4	2–1	1–1	1–1	4–3	1–1	2–0	2–0	0–1	3–0	0–1	0–0	0–0	1–1		2–1	2–1	1–2	2–0
CD Tenerife	3–3	2–3	4–0	0–1	0–0	6–0	2–1	5–1	2–1	3–1	2–0	2–2	1–2	1–1	2–2	0–1	0–2	6–0		2–1	1–3	3–3
Valencia CF	5–2	3–1	1–1	1–1	2–0	2–1	1–1	1–1	0–0	3–0	0–1	1–1	1–0	1–1	2–1	0–1	4–2	2–1	2–1		2–4	1–1
Valladolid	0–0	0–3	3–1	1–3	0–1	3–1	1–1	2–1	4–0	1–0	2–1	3–0	4–0	1–1	0–1	3–0	0–1	1–0	0–2	4–1		1–1
Zaragoza	1–1	2–3	3–5	2–2	1–1	1–3	1–2	1–0	3–1	2–0	2–2	0–2	3–2	1–2	1–0	3–0	2–1	5–0	1–1	1–1	1–0	

Updated to match(es) played on unknown. Source:
Legend: Blue = home team win; Yellow = draw; Red = away team win.

== Relegation playoff ==
Team 1	Agg.	Team 2	1st leg	2nd leg
RCD Mallorca	(a) 2–2	Rayo Vallecano	1–0	1–2

=== First leg ===
25 June 1997	RCD Mallorca	1–0	Rayo Vallecano	Palma de Mallorca
22:00	Barbero 17'	Report (in Spanish)		Stadium: Lluís Sitjar; Attendance: 25,000; Referee: Juan Manuel Brito Arceo (Canary Islands)

=== Second leg ===
29 June 1997	Rayo Vallecano	2–1 (2–2 agg.)	RCD Mallorca	Madrid
21:30	Klimowicz 38' (pen.); Cortijo 86'	Report (in Spanish)	Carlitos 58'	Stadium: Vallecas; Attendance: 14,000; Referee: Celino Gracia Redondo (Aragon)

== Top goalscorers ==
Rank	Player	Club	Goals
1	(Brazil) Ronaldo	Barcelona	34
2	(Spain) Alfonso	Real Betis	25
3	(Croatia) Davor Šuker	Real Madrid	24
4	(Spain) Raúl	Real Madrid	21
4	(Brazil) Rivaldo	Deportivo La Coruña	21
6	(Spain) Oli	Oviedo	19
7	(Spain) Luis Enrique	Barcelona	17
7	(Nigeria) Ohen	Compostela	17
7	(Spain) José Ángel Ziganda	Athletic Bilbao	17
10	(Spain) Víctor Fernández	Valladolid	16
10	(Bulgaria) Lyuboslav Penev	Compostela	16
10	(Spain) Ismael Urzaiz	Athletic Bilbao	16

== Attendances ==
#	Club	Avg. attendance	Highest
1	FC Barcelona	86,429	115,000
2	Real Madrid	85,429	110,000
3	Sevilla FC	44,436	71,114
4	Valencia CF	42,624	50,000
5	Real Betis	40,786	47,500
6	Athletic Club	38,743	44,000
7	Atlético de Madrid	32,238	52,000
8	Real Zaragoza	28,000	35,000
9	Deportivo de La Coruña	23,571	33,000
10	RCD Espanyol	22,343	40,000
11	Real Sociedad	20,810	28,300
12	Real Sporting de Gijón	19,157	30,000
13	Real Valladolid	18,729	26,000
14	Celta de Vigo	17,595	30,000
15	Racing de Santander	17,000	21,000
16	Hércules CF	16,470	28,207
17	CD Tenerife	15,143	22,500
18	Real Oviedo	14,483	23,500
19	CD Logroñés	12,500	18,000
20	Extremadura CF	10,380	15,000
21	SD Compostela	9,714	14,000
22	Rayo Vallecano	8,738	13,000
