= 1998–99 Segunda División =

68th season of the second-tier football league in Spain

Segunda División
- Season: 1998-99
- Champions: Málaga CF
- Promoted: Málaga CF; CD Numancia; Sevilla CF; Rayo Vallecano
- Relegated: RCD Mallorca B Barcelona B Hércules CF; CD Orense
- Matches: 462
- Goals: 1,120 (2.42 per match)
- Top goalscorer: (Brazil) Catanha

The 1998–99 Segunda División season saw 22 teams participate in the second flight Spanish league. Málaga CF won the league.

Málaga CF, CD Numancia, Sevilla FC and Rayo Vallecano were promoted to Primera División. RCD Mallorca B, Barcelona B, Hércules CF and CD Ourense were relegated to Segunda División B.

== Teams ==
Location of teams in Segunda División 1998-99
Canary Islands

Team	Home city	Stadium
Albacete	Albacete	Carlos Belmonte
Atlético Madrid B	Madrid	Cerro del Espino
Badajoz	Badajoz	Nuevo Vivero
Barcelona B	Barcelona	Mini Estadi
Compostela	Santiago de Compostela	San Lázaro
Eibar	Eibar	Ipurua
Hércules	Alicante	José Rico Pérez
Las Palmas	Las Palmas	Insular
Leganés	Leganés	Butarque
Lleida	Lleida	Camp d'Esports
Logroñés	Logroño	Las Gaunas
Málaga	Málaga	La Rosaleda
Mallorca B	Palma de Mallorca	Lluís Sitjar
Mérida	Mérida	Romano
Numancia	Soria	Los Pajaritos
Osasuna	Pamplona	El Sadar
Ourense	Ourense	O Couto
Rayo Vallecano	Madrid	Vallecas
Recreativo de Huelva	Huelva	Colombino
Sevilla	Seville	Ramón Sánchez Pizjuán
Sporting de Gijón	Gijón	El Molinón
Toledo	Toledo	Salto del Caballo

=== Teams by Autonomous Community ===
	Autonomous community	Number of teams	Teams
1	Andalusia	3	Málaga, Recreativo, Sevilla
1	Madrid	3	Atlético Madrid B, Leganés, Rayo Vallecano
3	Castile-La Mancha	2	Albacete, Toledo
3	Catalonia	2	Barcelona B, Lleida
3	Extremadura	2	Badajoz, Mérida
3	Galicia	2	Compostela, Ourense
7	Asturias	1	Sporting
7	Balearic Islands	1	Mallorca B
7	Basque Country	1	Eibar
7	Canary Islands	1	Las Palmas
7	Castile and León	1	Numancia
7	La Rioja	1	Logroñés
7	Navarre	1	Osasuna
7	Valencia	1	Hércules

== Final table ==
Pos	Team	Pld	W	D	L	GF	GA	GD	Pts	Promotion, qualification or relegation
1	Málaga (C, P)	42	22	13	7	72	47	+25	79	Promotion to La Liga
2	Atlético Madrid B	42	21	11	10	73	51	+22	74	Declined from promotion (Note: Atlético de Madrid B was ineligible for promotion for being reserve team of Atlético de Madrid)
3	Numancia (P)	42	21	10	11	68	40	+28	73	Promotion to La Liga
4	Sevilla (O, P)	42	20	11	11	66	50	+16	71	Qualification to promotion play-offs
5	Rayo Vallecano (O, P)	42	19	14	9	64	49	+15	71	Qualification to promotion play-offs
6	Las Palmas	42	17	17	8	57	38	+19	68	
7	Toledo	42	18	11	13	54	49	+5	65	
8	Compostela	42	16	13	13	60	53	+7	61	
9	Sporting de Gijón	42	16	11	15	47	47	0	59	
10	Mérida	42	15	14	13	48	41	+7	59	
11	Lleida	42	15	14	13	52	50	+2	59	
12	Recreativo	42	14	16	12	40	35	+5	58	
13	Osasuna	42	15	12	15	44	51	−7	57	
14	Badajoz	42	12	15	15	35	39	−4	51	
15	Albacete	42	12	14	16	38	43	−5	50	
16	Logroñés	42	12	12	18	48	57	−9	48	
17	Leganés	42	10	17	15	36	44	−8	47	
18	Eibar	42	13	8	21	42	56	−14	47	
19	Mallorca B (R)	42	12	10	20	52	64	−12	46	Relegation to Segunda División B
20	Barcelona B (R)	42	13	5	24	51	68	−17	44	Relegation to Segunda División B
21	Hércules (R)	42	10	10	22	38	66	−28	40	Relegation to Segunda División B
22	Ourense (R)	42	7	6	29	35	82	−47	27	Relegation to Segunda División B

Rules for classification: 1st points; 2nd head-to-head points; 3rd head-to-head goal difference; 4th head-to-head goals scored; 5th goal difference; 6th number of goals scored; 7th Fair-play points
(C) Champions; (O) Play-off winners; (P) Promoted; (R) Relegated

== Results ==
Home \ Away	ALB	ATM	BAD	BAR	COM	EIB	HÉR	LPA	LEG	LLE	LOG	MAL	MLL	MÉR	NUM	OSA	OUR	RAY	REC	SEV	SPG	TOL
Albacete	—	0–0	0–1	3–0	1–0	0–1	3–1	1–0	0–0	0–1	2–0	2–2	0–2	0–2	1–1	2–0	2–1	2–2	0–0	3–1	0–0	0–2
Atlético B	0–0	—	1–1	2–0	0–0	2–1	2–3	2–1	1–1	2–2	3–2	5–3	2–1	0–1	3–1	4–0	2–1	1–2	3–1	0–1	1–0	2–1
Badajoz	0–0	1–2	—	1–0	2–2	1–1	1–1	0–0	1–0	1–2	2–1	2–0	0–1	0–0	2–1	0–1	2–0	2–2	0–3	1–0	2–0	0–1
Barcelona B	0–1	1–1	0–1	—	1–0	0–0	4–1	1–2	0–2	1–2	1–2	1–1	1–2	3–1	0–4	4–0	5–0	1–0	1–2	2–2	4–0	0–3
Compostela	3–1	0–3	1–0	2–1	—	1–0	3–1	0–1	4–1	1–1	3–1	3–3	2–0	0–0	0–1	0–2	3–0	1–3	0–0	1–0	2–2	1–1
Eibar	0–1	3–1	0–1	2–0	1–3	—	1–0	0–1	0–0	1–1	2–2	0–0	0–1	1–0	1–2	2–0	2–1	1–2	0–0	1–3	2–1	3–0
Hércules	2–1	1–3	2–0	1–2	3–2	1–3	—	0–2	0–1	0–3	1–1	0–3	2–1	0–0	0–0	1–1	0–2	1–1	0–0	0–0	1–0	1–0
Las Palmas	2–1	0–1	1–1	4–1	1–1	3–0	4–2	—	1–1	0–0	2–1	1–1	4–2	1–0	0–2	1–0	6–0	3–0	0–0	2–2	3–0	0–0
Leganés	0–0	1–1	1–0	2–0	2–2	2–0	2–2	0–0	—	1–0	1–1	0–2	0–0	1–1	0–5	3–1	3–0	0–2	1–0	0–1	0–1	1–2
Lleida	0–0	3–0	0–0	2–3	2–3	3–2	1–0	1–1	1–4	—	2–1	0–2	1–0	2–3	2–1	1–0	2–1	0–0	0–2	3–0	0–1	3–1
Logroñés	0–1	2–3	1–0	0–1	0–3	1–1	2–1	1–1	0–0	1–1	—	1–1	0–1	2–1	1–0	0–0	2–2	1–0	4–1	0–1	0–2	1–0
Málaga	3–2	0–3	1–2	2–0	2–1	2–1	2–1	0–0	3–0	0–0	3–2	—	2–1	4–3	2–1	3–0	1–1	1–3	3–1	0–1	1–1	3–0
Mallorca B	0–0	3–4	3–3	4–1	1–1	0–1	1–3	2–0	2–1	1–1	1–1	0–1	—	0–0	0–3	1–1	2–0	4–4	2–1	0–0	2–0	0–1
Mérida	3–0	1–1	1–0	4–2	0–1	0–2	3–1	1–1	2–0	1–0	2–1	1–4	3–0	—	2–0	1–0	1–1	4–2	0–0	3–3	0–1	1–1
Numancia	1–1	2–1	2–1	0–2	1–0	2–1	2–0	0–0	1–1	2–2	2–3	0–0	4–1	2–1	—	3–0	4–0	2–1	3–0	3–2	1–1	0–2
Osasuna	1–0	2–2	2–0	1–2	2–1	3–0	0–0	4–0	1–0	2–0	1–1	1–0	3–2	0–0	0–1	—	2–1	1–1	0–0	2–1	0–4	0–1
Ourense	2–2	0–4	1–1	2–0	0–2	4–2	1–2	4–1	1–0	1–1	1–0	0–1	1–2	0–1	0–2	1–4	—	1–2	1–0	2–3	1–2	0–1
Rayo	2–0	3–0	1–1	0–0	1–2	3–0	3–0	2–2	1–0	4–1	2–1	0–2	2–1	1–0	1–1	1–1	2–0	—	2–1	1–4	2–1	1–1
Recreativo	1–0	1–0	1–0	5–0	1–1	2–0	1–0	0–0	0–0	2–1	1–2	2–2	3–2	0–0	3–2	0–0	2–0	0–0	—	0–1	0–0	2–2
Sevilla	2–1	2–2	0–0	0–3	5–1	2–0	1–0	1–3	1–0	2–2	0–3	2–3	3–1	0–0	1–0	4–0	3–0	4–1	1–0	—	2–0	2–2
Sporting	4–2	0–3	1–0	2–1	3–1	3–1	2–0	0–2	0–1	0–1	0–1	1–1	3–2	2–0	0–2	1–1	1–0	0–0	0–1	2–2	—	0–0
Toledo	0–2	2–0	1–1	2–1	2–2	1–2	1–2	2–0	3–3	2–1	4–1	1–2	1–0	1–0	1–1	1–4	2–0	0–1	1–0	2–0	2–5	—

Source: BDFutbol
Legend: Blue = home team win; Yellow = draw; Red = away team win.

== Promotion playoff ==
Team 1	Agg.	Team 2	1st leg	2nd leg
CF Extremadura	0–4	Rayo Vallecano	0–2	0–2
Villarreal CF	0–3	Sevilla FC	0–2	0–1

=== First leg ===
27 June 1999	CF Extremadura	0–2	Rayo Vallecano	Almendralejo
21:00		Report (in Spanish)	Luis Cembranos 7'; Llorens 86' (pen.)	Stadium: Francisco de la Hera; Attendance: 9,100; Referee: Eduardo Iturralde González (Basque Country (autonomous community))

27 June 1999	Villarreal CF	0–2	Sevilla FC	Villarreal
21:00		Report (in Spanish)	Tsiartas 2', 45'	Stadium: El Madrigal; Attendance: 17,000; Referee: Víctor Esquinas Torres (Community of Madrid)

=== Second leg ===
30 June 1999	Rayo Vallecano	2–0 (4–0 agg.)	CF Extremadura	Madrid
21:30	Tiago 52'; Bolo 55'	Report (in Spanish)		Stadium: Vallecas; Attendance: 15,600; Referee: Antonio Jesús López Nieto (Andalusia)

30 June 1999	Sevilla FC	1–0 (3–0 agg.)	Villarreal CF	Seville
21:45	Quevedo 50'	Report (in Spanish)		Stadium: Ramón Sánchez Pizjuán; Attendance: 48,000; Referee: Manuel Mejuto González (Asturias)
