= Christopher Ohen =

Nigerian footballer (born 1970)

Personal information
- Full name: Christopher Nusa Ohenhen
- Date of birth: 14 October 1970 (age 56)
- Place of birth: Benin City, Nigeria
- Height: 1.82 m (6 ft 0 in)
- Position: Striker

Youth career
- Julius Berger

Senior career*
Years	Team	Apps	(Gls)
1988–1989	Julius Berger		
1989–1991	Real Madrid B	26	(9)
1991–2001	Compostela	196	(70)
1998–1999	→ Besiktas (loan)	17	(10)
2001–2002	Leganés	3	(0)
2002	Julius Berger		

International career
1989	Nigeria U20	6	(3)
1997	Nigeria	1	(0)
- * Club domestic league appearances and goals

Christopher Nusa Ohenhen (born 14 October 1970), known as Ohen, is a Nigerian former professional footballer who played as a striker.

He spent the vast majority of his professional career in Spain, with Compostela.

== Career ==
Born in Benin City, Ohen began his career at Julius Berger FC, then left at the age of 18 for Spain, where he would spend the following decade. He had participated at the 1989 FIFA World Youth Championship, where his three goals for Nigeria U20 attracted the attention of Real Madrid.

After two years playing solely with the reserve team, Ohen signed with SD Compostela, where he scored at an impressive rate. In his third year he netted 13 goals as the Galicians achieved a first-ever La Liga promotion, then scored a combined 42 times the following three; he was called up to a preliminary Nigeria national team squad for the 1998 FIFA World Cup, but did not make the final cut.

After a loan to Turkey's Besiktas, Ohen's final years were highly irregular, and he also dealt with injury problems. After an unassuming spell with CD Leganés, he saw out his career with his first club Julius Berger.
