= Estadio Verónica Boquete de San Lázaro =

Football stadium in Santiago de Compostela, Spain

Verónica Boquete de San Lázaro
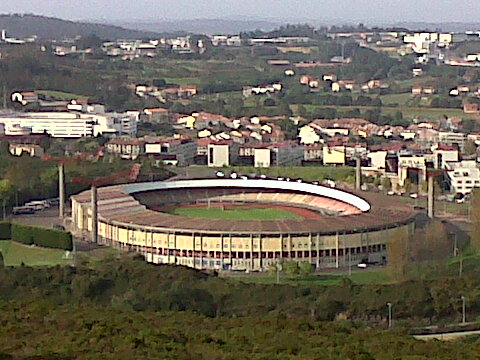
- Interactive map of Verónica Boquete de San Lázaro
- Full name: Estadio Municipal Verónica Boquete de San Lázaro
- Location: Santiago de Compostela, Spain
- Coordinates: 42°52′57.96″N 8°30′57.65″W
- Owner: Concello de Santiago
- Operator: Concello de Santiago
- Capacity: 16,666
- Surface: Grass
- Field size: 105 m × 68 m (344 ft × 223 ft)

Construction
- Groundbreaking: 1991
- Opened: 24 June 1993
- Cost: 3,000,000,000 Ptas (1993)
- Architect: Andrés Fernández-Albalat Lois
- General contractor: Entrecanales

Tenants
- SD Compostela (1993–present); SD Ciudad de Santiago (2006–2009)

Estadio Municipal Verónica Boquete de San Lázaro, formerly called Estadio Multiusos de San Lázaro, is a multipurpose stadium in Santiago de Compostela, Spain. It is used mostly for football matches and is the home ground of SD Compostela. It has a capacity of 16,666 and the pitch dimensions are 105 by 68 metres (344 ft × 223 ft).

== Facilities ==
Situated in the eastern suburb of San Lázaro, the stadium is a multipurpose arena, used primarily for the football matches. The stadium is oval and has a terracotta-coloured roof that rises on the west side to incorporate the director's seating and press facilities on a second tier. The pitch is surrounded by a 400 m athletics track, which is relatively uncommon in Spanish stadiums. The majority of the 16,666 seats are incorporated on a single, covered tier.

== History ==
The inaugural match took place on 24 June 1993, when a four-way tournament was staged, featuring Deportivo de La Coruña, CD Tenerife, CA River Plate and São Paulo FC. Deportivo and River Plate played in the first match and Bebeto had the honour of scoring the first goal.

On 8 November 2018, the stadium was renamed to pay homage to Verónica Boquete, a Spanish footballer who is widely regarded as one of the greatest Spanish footballers of all time and one of the best footballers of her generation.
