= SD Compostela =

Association football club in Spain

- Full name: Sociedade Deportiva Compostela
- Nicknames: Compos; La Esedé (The S-D)
- Short name: Compostela; Compos
- Founded: 16 May 1928; 98 years ago; re-organised on 26 June 1962; 64 years ago and on 1 June 2004; 22 years ago
- Stadium: San Lázaro, Santiago de Compostela, Galicia
- Capacity: 16,666
- Owner: Antonio Agrasar Cascallar
- President: Antonio Agrasar Cascallar
- Head coach: Carlos de Lerma
- League: Segunda Federación – Group 1
- 2025–26: Tercera Federación – Group 1, 2nd of 18 (promoted via play-offs)
- Website: http://www.sdcompostela.com
Home colours	Away colours

Sociedade Deportiva Compostela is a Spanish professional football team based in Santiago de Compostela, Galicia. The club was founded in 1928 and enjoyed a spell in La Liga during the mid-1990s.

The club currently competes in Segunda Federación – Group 1, the fourth tier of Spanish football league system.

The club plays their home games at San Lázaro.

== History ==
A team called Compostela Foot-ball Club was founded in 1928, ceasing to exist in 1946. On 26 June 1962 a new team was created called Sociedad Recreativa Compostela, and on 28 October 1962 the newly-formed SR Compostela merged with another team, Club Arenal, changing names to Sociedad Deportiva Compostela. The 1970s saw the club change levels. The team played in the Tercera División, in the Regional category and in the new Segunda División B. Its first promotion to a semi-national stage occurred in 1977, with a promotion to Segunda División B (Group 1), which lasted just one season; Compos promoted again in 1980, this time lasting six years.

Relegation in 1986 was compounded by off-field controversy surrounding the actions of then president Francisco Steppe. He resigned amid allegations of receipt of payments to throw a game against Pontevedra CF, which would assure the opposition avoided relegation. The late 1980s saw a significant restructuring of the club both at board and management levels and, in 1990, Compostela regained third-level status.

The following campaign was to prove the club's most successful to date. On 23 June 1991, a capacity crowd of 8,000 at the Estadio Municipal Santa Isabel, saw goals from Juanito and Ochoa (two) clinch a 3–1 victory in the final play-off match against CD Badajoz, for a first-ever Segunda División visit.

The move to Estadio Multiusos de San Lázaro coincided with the continuing rise in the team's fortunes and, at the end of 1993–94, following a 3–1 play-off victory against Rayo Vallecano, Compostela reached La Liga. Compostela did remarkably well, and reached a best finish of 10th in 1995–96, mainly courtesy of strikers Christopher Ohen and Bent Christensen, who totalled 23 league goals.

After four seasons at the top, Compostela was relegated after losing a relegation play-off match to Villarreal CF on the away goals rule, despite playing overall attractive football. The club was also about to start a downward spiral; after a relegation to the third level in 2001 the team returned the following year but, in the following campaign, played to a backdrop of off-field distractions, with the players and staff going unpaid for months – a final ninth place was not enough to prevent another relegation, as the club failed to meet the 31 July deadline to settle all wage debts.

=== Off-field problems ===
In the 2001–02 season economic problems arose. However, the squad with Luis Ángel Duque as coach managed to achieve promotion to the Segunda División. Off-field problems continued in 2003–04, with the pinnacle being the players, who had not been paid in several months, refusing to appear for a fixture at UB Conquense, with the subsequent loss of three points. At the season's close, after the actual relegation, Compostela dropped further to the Galician Regional Preferente (north) after failing again to meet the financial deadline. They played there for two seasons, and folded after the 2005–06 season, when a judge dissolved the institution in the summer of 2006, and auctioned all the club's properties, including the brand name, the trophies and the team's spot in the league. Finally, 26 January 2011, after everything was sold out, the court published the legal liquidation of the entity.

=== Re-organisation ===
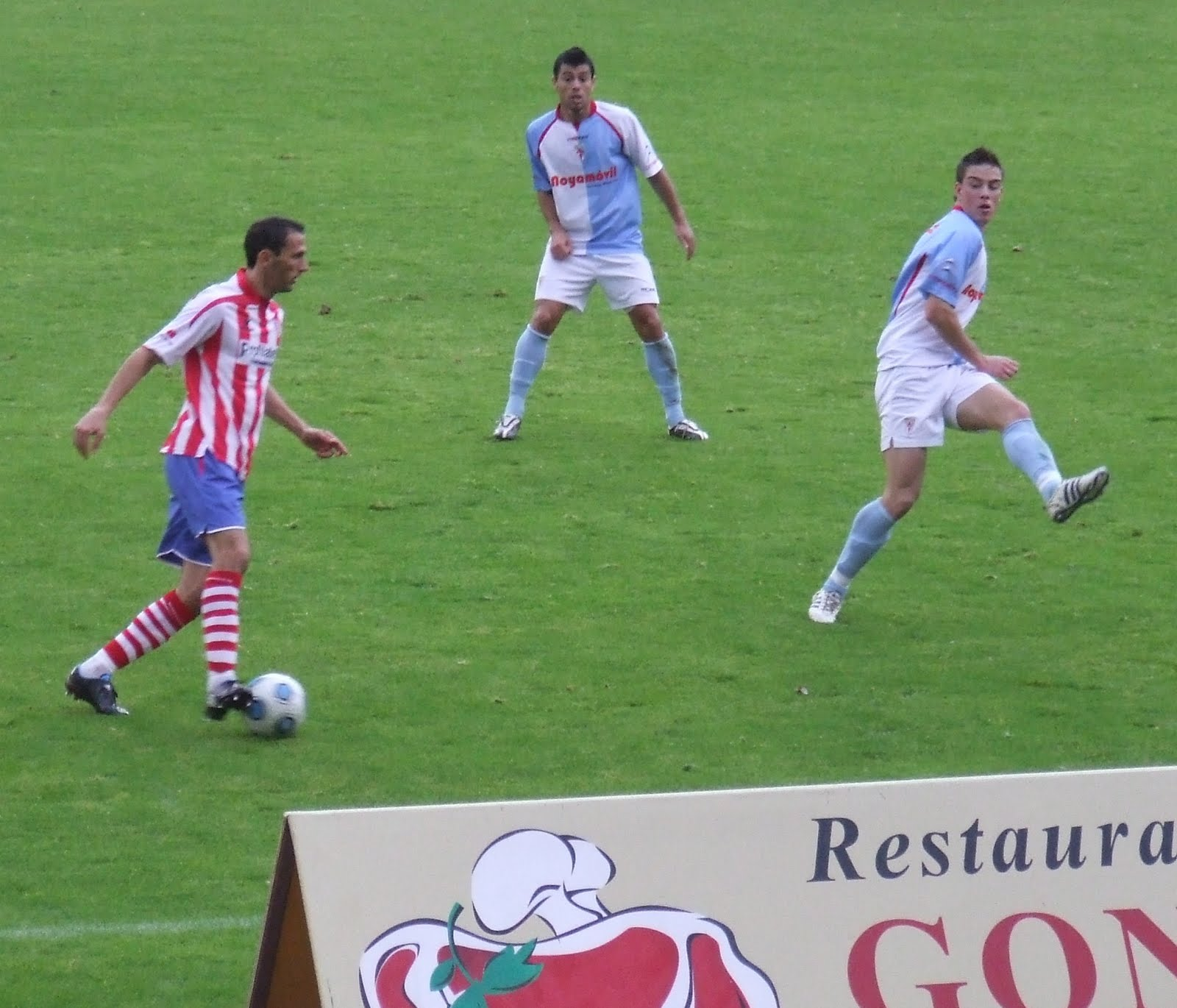
Compostela playing against Lugo on 22 November 2009.

Previously to SD Compostela's liquidation in 2006, a new club was created on 1 June 2004 with the name SD Campus Stellae, with José Luís Balboa as president. They entered competition in the 2005–06 season at the group 11 of the Galicia Terceira Autonómica league, where he finishes in 11th position (out of 18 teams). The following season, 2006–07, they played in group 12 of the same division, and finished third out of 14 teams.

In 2006, a former president of the dissolved SD Compostela, José María Caneda, bought the commercial name Sociedad Deportiva Compostela, and became president of the SD Campus Stellae, changing the team's name at the beginning of the 2007–08 season to the former club's brand.

In the 2007–08 season, the new club won its Preferente league and returned to Tercera. In the following campaign, after finishing first in its group, the team beat Atlético Monzón with a 4–2 aggregate (3–0, 1–2) and won a second consecutive promotion. However, this would be a short-lived return, with relegation befalling at the season's end, immediately followed by another one due to overwhelming financial problems. Longtime president José María Caneda left the club.

== Season-by-season records ==
- SD Compostela SAD (1962–2007)

Season	Tier	Division	Place	Copa del Rey
1962–63	4	Serie A	1st	
1963–64	3	3ª	1st	—
1964–65	3	3ª	2nd	—
1965–66	3	3ª	4th	—
1966–67	3	3ª	3rd	—
1967–68	3	3ª	2nd	—
1968–69	3	3ª	3rd	—
1969–70	3	3ª	10th	Second round
1970–71	4	Serie A	1st	
1971–72	3	3ª	11th	First round
1972–73	3	3ª	18th	Second round
1973–74	4	Serie A	2nd	
1974–75	4	Serie A	2nd	
1975–76	4	Serie A	1st	
1976–77	3	3ª	9th	Second round
1977–78	3	2ª B	18th	First round
1978–79	4	3ª	12th	First round
1979–80	4	3ª	1st	Third round
1980–81	3	2ª B	7th	Second round
1981–82	3	2ª B	15th	Second round

Season	Tier	Division	Place	Copa del Rey
1982–83	3	2ª B	11th	—
1983–84	3	2ª B	14th	First round
1984–85	3	2ª B	15th	—
1985–86	3	2ª B	18th	—
1986–87	4	3ª	6th	—
1987–88	4	3ª	4th	First round
1988–89	4	3ª	3rd	—
1989–90	4	3ª	1st	—
1990–91	3	2ª B	3rd	Third round
1991–92	2	2ª	8th	Fifth round
1992–93	2	2ª	12th	Fifth round
1993–94	2	2ª	3rd	Fourth round
1994–95	1	1ª	16th	Fourth round
1995–96	1	1ª	10th	Round of 16
1996–97	1	1ª	11th	Round of 16
1997–98	1	1ª	17th	Third round
1998–99	2	2ª	8th	Second round
1999–2000	2	2ª	18th	Quarter-finals
2000–01	2	2ª	19th	Third round
2001–02	3	2ª B	3rd	First round

Season	Tier	Division	Place	Copa del Rey
2002–03	2	2ª	9th	First round
2003–04	3	2ª B	19th	Second round
2004–05	5	Reg. Pref.	16th	
2005–06	5	Reg. Pref.	14th	
2006–07	5	Pref. Aut.	3rd	

- 4 seasons in La Liga
- 7 seasons in Segunda División
- 10 seasons in Segunda División B
- 16 seasons in Tercera División (10 as third tier, 6 as fourth tier)

- SD Compostela (2005–)

Season	Tier	Division	Place	Copa del Rey
2005–06	8	3ª Aut.	11th	
2006–07	8	3ª Aut.	3rd	
2007–08	5	Pref. Aut.	1st	
2008–09	4	3ª	1st	
2009–10	3	2ª B	20th	First round
2010–11	5	Pref. Aut.	8th	
2011–12	5	Pref. Aut.	1st	
2012–13	4	3ª	3rd	
2013–14	3	2ª B	13th	
2014–15	3	2ª B	6th	
2015–16	3	2ª B	19th	First round
2016–17	4	3ª	7th	
2017–18	4	3ª	1st	
2018–19	4	3ª	3rd	Second round
2019–20	4	3ª	1st	Second round
2020–21	3	2ª B	6th / 5th	First round
2021–22	4	2ª RFEF	8th	
2022–23	4	2ª Fed.	4th	
2023–24	4	2ª Fed.	7th	First round
2024–25	4	2ª Fed.	14th	First round
2025–26	5	3ª Fed.	2nd	
2026–27	4	2ª Fed.		TBD

- 5 seasons in Segunda División B
- 5 seasons in Segunda Federación/Segunda División RFEF
- 6 seasons in Tercera División
- 1 season in Tercera Federación

== Honours ==
- Tercera División: 2008–09, 2017–18, 2019–20

== Current squad ==
As of 1 March 2026

Note: Flags indicate national team as defined under FIFA eligibility rules; some limited exceptions apply. Players may hold more than one non-FIFA nationality.

No.	Pos.	Nation	Player
1	GK	ESP	Álex Cobo
2	DF	ESP	Jorge Valín
3	DF	ESP	Aaron Martinez
4	MF	ESP	Unai Peón
5	DF	ESP	Pablo Crespo
6	DF	ESP	Damián Noya
7	FW	ESP	Adrián Armental
8	FW	ESP	Jorge Maceira
9	FW	ESP	Carlos López
10	FW	ESP	Juan Parapar
11	FW	ESP	Antón Guisande

No.	Pos.	Nation	Player
13	GK	ESP	Roi Graumann
14	MF	ESP	Samu (captain)
15	DF	CRO	Stipe Zubanovic
16	MF	ESP	Joaquín Goris
17	DF	ESP	Kiko González
19	DF	ESP	Diego Rodríguez
20	FW	ESP	Jesús Cañizares
21	MF	ESP	David Rosón
22	MF	ESP	Diego Uzal
24	DF	ESP	Riki Mangana

== Famous players ==
Note: this list includes players that have appeared in at least 100 league games and/or have reached international status.

- (Brazil) Adriano
- (Brazil) Fabiano
- (Brazil) William
- (Bulgaria) Luboslav Penev
- (Denmark) Bent Christensen
- (France) Franck Passi
- (France) Stéphane Pignol
- (Morocco) Saïd Chiba
- (Netherlands) Peter Hoekstra
- (Netherlands) Juan Viedma
- (Nigeria) Christopher Ohen
- (Russia) Dmitri Popov
- (Russia) Dmitri Radchenko
- (Serbia) Zoran Marić
- (Serbia) Goran Šaula
- (Spain) Javier Bellido
- (Spain) Manuel Castiñeiras
- (Spain) Pichi Lucas
- (Spain) Nacho
- (Spain) Nando
- (Spain) Pablo Pinillos
- (Spain) Tomás Reñones
- (Spain) José Luis Veloso
- (Uruguay) Óscar Ferro

== Famous managers ==
- (Spain) Fernando Castro Santos
- (Spain) Fernando Vázquez
- (Brazil) Fabiano Soares

== Stadium ==
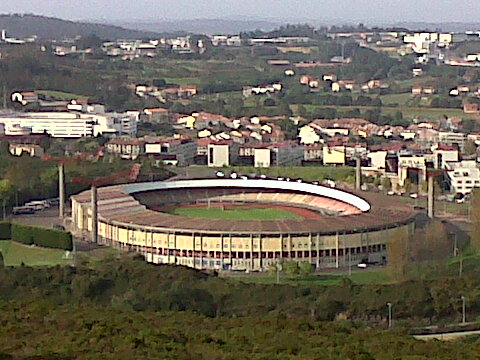
View of Estadio Multiusos de San Lázaro.

Compostela play at the Estadio Multiusos de San Lázaro, which has a capacity of 16,666. Pitch dimensions are 105 x 68 metres.

Compostela played their first season at Estadio da Residencia da Universidade de Santiago de Compostela, whilst work was completed on their first permanent ground, Estadio Municipal de Santa Isabel; on 22 September 1963, it played the first match at the new stadium. It was a basic enclosure and lacked a covered stand until 1969, when a tribune was erected and floodlights installed at a cost of 1 million pesetas. Compostela continued to use the ground for first team fixtures until the end of the 1993 season. The reserve team, Compostela B, played on at Santa Isabel until early 2003, when the ground was finally demolished and replaced with a municipal sports centre that bore the same name.

Work started on the Multiusos de San Lázaro in 1991. Situated in the eastern suburb of San Lázaro, it was a multi-purpose arena, used primarily for the football matches of its two resident clubs, Compostela and SD Ciudad de Santiago. Oval in shape and with a terracotta-coloured roof on the west side to incorporate the directors' seating and press facilities on a second tier, the pitch was surrounded by a 400m athletics track, relatively uncommon in Spanish stadiums.

The inaugural match took place on 24 June 1993, when a four-way tournament was staged, featuring Deportivo de La Coruña, CD Tenerife, Club Atlético River Plate and São Paulo FC. Deportivo and River played in the first match, and Bebeto had the honour of scoring the first goal.

== See also ==
- 1995–96 La Liga, best season in the history of the club.
