= 1996–97 RC Celta de Vigo season =

Celta Vigo
1996–97 season
- President: Horacio Gómez
- Head coach: Fernando Castro Santos
- Stadium: Balaídos
- La Liga: 16th
- Copa del Rey: Semi-finals
- Top goalscorer: League: Vladimir Gudelj (13); All: Vladimir Gudelj (14)
Home colours	Away colours

Celta Vigo contested La Liga and the Copa del Rey in the 1996–97 season. They placed 16th in La Liga, their worst result since earning promotion in 1992. They were more successful in the Copa del Rey, reaching the semi-finals for the second time in four seasons before being eliminated by eventual runners-up Real Betis.

== Squad ==
Note: Flags indicate national team as defined under FIFA eligibility rules; some limited exceptions apply. Players may hold more than one non-FIFA nationality.

No.	Pos.	Nation	Player
1	GK	ESP	Patxi Villanueva
2	DF	ESP	Alejo
3	DF	ESP	Rafael Berges
4	DF	ESP	Patxi Salinas (captain)
5	MF	PER	José del Solar
6	MF	BRA	Mazinho
7	MF	BIH	Milorad Ratković
8	MF	ESP	Ángel Merino
9	MF	ISR	Haim Revivo
10	FW	BIH	Vladimir Gudelj
11	MF	ESP	Geli
12	DF	ESP	Andoni Lakabeg
13	GK	FRA	Richard Dutruel
14	DF	BRA	Adriano Teixeira

No.	Pos.	Nation	Player
15	MF	ESP	Eusebio
16	DF	ESP	Borja Agirretxu
17	MF	FRA	Daniel Dutuel
18	FW	ESP	Juan Sánchez
19	MF	YUG	Srđan Bajčetić
20	FW	ESP	Juan Manuel Prieto
21	DF	ESP	José Manuel Tárraga
22	DF	ESP	Josema
23	FW	ESP	Moisés
24	MF	RUS	Aleksandr Mostovoi
25	GK	ESP	José Luis Diezma
26	DF	ESP	José Ramón Dacosta
27	MF	ESP	Javi González
—	FW	ESP	Pablo Couñago

=== Transfers ===
In
Pos.	Name	from	Type
GK	Richard Dutruel	Paris Saint-Germain	
MF	Mazinho	Valencia CF	
MF	Aleksandr Mostovoi	RC Strasbourg	
MF	José del Solar	UD Salamanca	
MF	Daniel Dutuel	Girondins Bordeaux	
MF	Haim Revivo	Maccabi Haifa	
GK	José Luis Diezma	Real Betis	
DF	Adriano Teixeira	Sport	

Out
Pos.	Name	To	Type
GK	Toni Prats	Real Betis	
DF	Gil	Racing Ferrol	
FW	Goran Milojevic	CP Merida	
DF	Mariano Hoyas	CP Merida	
DF	Michel Salgado	UD Salamanca	loan
MF	Hermes Desio	UD Salamanca	
MF	Carlos Perez	UD Almeria	
MF	Vicente		

=== Left club during season ===
Note: Flags indicate national team as defined under FIFA eligibility rules; some limited exceptions apply. Players may hold more than one non-FIFA nationality.

No. / Pos. / Nation / Player; 23 / MF / ESP / Carlos Pérez (on loan to Almería)	No. / Pos. / Nation / Player; 26 / MF / ESP / David Belenguer (on loan to Lleida)

== Squad stats ==
Last updated on 16 February 2021.

No.	Pos	Nat	Player	Total		La Liga		Copa del Rey	
No.	Pos	Nat	Player	Apps	Goals	Apps	Goals	Apps	Goals
13	GK	(France) FRA	Richard Dutruel	41	0	36	0	5	0
2	DF	(Spain) ESP	Alejo	32	2	23+5	2	4	0
4	DF	(Spain) ESP	Patxi Salinas	36	0	31+1	0	4	0
3	DF	(Spain) ESP	Rafael Berges	26	1	19	1	7	0
17	MF	(France) FRA	Daniel Dutuel	39	1	24+8	1	6+1	0
5	MF	(Peru) PER	José del Solar	34	1	25+4	1	5	0
6	MF	(Brazil) BRA	Mazinho	47	3	40	3	7	0
7	MF	(Bosnia and Herzegovina) BIH	Milorad Ratković	35	5	25+3	3	3+4	2
8	MF	(Spain) ESP	Ángel Merino	45	3	37	3	8	0
24	MF	(Russia) RUS	Aleksandr Mostovoi	37	6	29+2	5	4+2	1
18	FW	(Spain) ESP	Juan Sánchez	40	5	24+8	4	5+3	1
25	GK	(Spain) ESP	José Luis Diezma	10	0	6	0	4	0
9	MF	(Israel) ISR	Haim Revivo	43	8	21+14	5	6+2	3
10	FW	(Bosnia and Herzegovina) BIH	Vladimir Gudelj	30	14	18+11	13	1	1
11	MF	(Spain) ESP	Geli	25	3	12+5	2	8	1
14	DF	(Brazil) BRA	Adriano Teixeira	30	0	16+4	0	10	0
27	MF	(Spain) ESP	Javi González	29	1	14+10	1	2+3	0
15	MF	(Spain) ESP	Eusebio	39	0	12+20	0	5+2	0
16	DF	(Spain) ESP	Borja Agirretxu	22	0	19+1	0	1+1	0
22	DF	(Spain) ESP	Josema	22	0	15+2	0	3+2	0
23	FW	(Spain) ESP	Moisés	11	2	6+2	2	1+2	0
19	MF	(Federal Republic of Yugoslavia) YUG	Srđan Bajčetić	17	1	5+6	1	3+3	0
21	DF	(Spain) ESP	José Manuel Tárraga	11	0	5+2	0	4	0
1	GK	(Spain) ESP	Patxi Villanueva	2	0	0+1	0	1	0
12	DF	(Spain) ESP	Andoni Lakabeg	2	0	0	0	1+1	0
20	FW	(Spain) ESP	Juan Manuel Prieto	15	3	0+12	1	2+1	2
26	DF	(Spain) ESP	José Ramón Dacosta	1	0	0+1	0	0	0
	FW	(Spain) ESP	Pablo Couñago	1	1	0	0	0+1	1
Players who have left the club after the start of the season:
23	MF	(Spain) ESP	Carlos Pérez	0	0	0	0	0	0
26	MF	(Spain) ESP	David Belenguer	1	0	0	0	0+1	0

== Results ==
=== La Liga ===
==== League table ====
Pos	Team	Pld	W	D	L	GF	GA	GD	Pts	Qualification or relegation
14	Zaragoza	42	12	14	16	58	66	−8	50 (Note: RAC: 9 pts; ZAR: 6 pts; SPG: 3 pts)	
15	Sporting Gijón	42	13	11	18	45	63	−18	50	
16	Celta Vigo	42	12	13	17	51	54	−3	49	
17	Oviedo	42	12	12	18	49	65	−16	48	
18	Rayo Vallecano (R)	42	13	6	23	43	62	−19	45	Qualification for the relegation playoffs

Source: LFP
Rules for classification: 1) points; 2) head-to-head points; 3) head-to-head goal difference; 4) head-to-head goals scored; 5) goal difference; 6) number of goals scored.
(R) Relegated

==== Position by round ====
Round	1	2	3	4	5	6	7	8	9	10	11	12	13	14	15	16	17	18	19	20	21	22	23	24	25	26	27	28	29	30	31	32	33	34	35	36	37	38	39	40	41	42
Ground	A	H	A	H	A	H	A	H	A	H	A	H	A	H	A	H	A	H	A	H	A	H	A	H	A	H	A	H	A	H	A	H	A	H	A	H	A	H	A	H	A	H
Result	L	D	W	L	L	W	D	D	W	D	D	L	W	W	L	W	L	L	D	L	L	D	D	W	D	W	L	D	L	D	D	W	L	W	L	D	L	L	W	L	L	W
Position	20	17	12	16	19	16	16	16	11	14	14	16	12	10	12	9	13	13	13	14	14	14	15	12	12	12	12	12	13	12	12	12	13	12	12	12	13	15	14	16	17	16

Source: Competitive matches
A = Away; H = Home; W = Win; D = Draw; L = Loss; = Leader, 1997–98 UEFA Champions League Group stage; = 1997–98 UEFA Cup First round; = 1996–97 La Liga#Relegation playoff; = 1997–98 Segunda Division; R = 1997–98 UEFA Cup Winners' Cup

==== Matches ====
1 September 1996 1	Atlético Madrid	2 – 0	Celta Vigo	Madrid, Spain
	Esnáider 46'; Kiko 49'	Report		Stadium: Estadio Vicente Calderón; Referee: José Manuel Andradas Asurmendi

8 September 1996 2	Celta Vigo	1 – 1	Deportivo La Coruña	Vigo, Spain
	Sánchez 85'	Report	17' (o.g.) Tárraga	Stadium: Balaídos; Referee: Celino Gracia Redondo

15 September 1996 3	Hércules	0 – 2	Celta Vigo	Alicante, Spain
		Report	5' Merino; 20' (pen.) Ratković	Stadium: Estadio José Rico Pérez; Referee: Arturo Daudén Ibáñez

22 September 1996 4	Celta Vigo	0 – 2	Real Betis	Vigo, Spain
		Report	46' Alexis Trujillo; 89' Olías	Stadium: Balaídos; Referee: Antonio Llonch Andreu

29 September 1996 5	Rayo Vallecano	3 – 0	Celta Vigo	Madrid, Spain
	Radchenko 18'; Guilherme 79'; Klimowicz 85'	Report		Stadium: Estadio Teresa Rivero; Referee: José Prados García

2 October 1996 6	Celta Vigo	3 – 1	Real Oviedo	Vigo, Spain
	Gudelj 16', 27' del Solar 63'	Report	47' Oli	Stadium: Balaídos; Referee: José Japón Sevilla

12 October 1996 7	Espanyol	0 – 0	Celta Vigo	Barcelona, Spain
		Report		Stadium: Estadi de Sarrià; Referee: César Barrenechea Montero

20 October 1996 8	Celta Vigo	1 – 1	Racing Santander	Vigo, Spain
	Cervera 60' (o.g.)	Report	73' Villabona	Stadium: Balaídos; Referee: Manuel Díaz Vega

23 October 1996 9	Real Sociedad	1 – 2	Celta Vigo	San Sebastián, Spain
	de Pedro 25' (pen.)	Report	66' (o.g.) Loren; 72' Prieto	Stadium: Anoeta; Referee: Juan Fernández Marín

27 October 1996 10	Celta Vigo	0 – 0	Real Zaragoza	Vigo, Spain
		Report		Stadium: Balaídos; Referee: José Losantos Omar

3 November 1996 11	Tenerife	0 – 0	Celta Vigo	Santa Cruz de Tenerife, Spain
		Report		Stadium: Helidoro Rodríguez López; Referee: Carlos Megía Dávila

10 November 1996 12	Celta Vigo	1 – 2	Compostela	Vigo, Spain
	Gudelj 40'	Report	12' Passi; 66' (pen.) Penev	Stadium: Balaídos; Referee: Manuel Mejuto González

17 November 1996 13	Logroñés	0 – 3	Celta Vigo	Logroño, Spain
		Report	56', 75' Gudelj; 68' Geli	Stadium: Estadio Las Gaunas; Referee: Carmelo Rodríguez Martel

24 November 1996 14	Celta Vigo	4 – 2	Sevilla	Vigo, Spain
	Ratković 9', 56'; Sánchez 12'; Gudelj 74'	Report	59' Tevenet; 82' Mornar	Stadium: Balaídos; Referee: José María García-Aranda

30 November 1996 15	Valencia	2 – 0	Celta Vigo	Valencia, Spain
	Karpin 21'; Hurtado 89'	Report		Stadium: Mestalla Stadium; Referee: Antonio Llonch Andreu

8 December 1996 16	Celta Vigo	2 – 1	Sporting de Gijón	Vigo, Spain
	Revivo 24'; González 89'	Report	20' Bango	Stadium: Balaídos; Referee: Fernando Carmona Méndez

22 December 1996 17	Barcelona	1 – 0	Celta Vigo	Barcelona, Spain
	Nadal 42'	Report		Stadium: Camp Nou; Referee: Celino Gracia Redondo

4 January 1997 18	Celta Vigo	0 – 2	Real Valladolid	Vigo, Spain
		Report	57' (pen.) Lozano; 89' Quevedo	Stadium: Balaídos; Referee: Victor José Esquinas Torres

12 January 1997 19	Athletic Bilbao	2 – 2	Celta Vigo	Bilbao, Spain
	Ziganda 7'; Alkiza 55'	Report	51' Gudelj; 76' Berges	Stadium: San Mamés; Referee: Manuel Díaz Vega

19 January 1997 20	Celta Vigo	0 – 1	Extremadura	Vigo, Spain
		Report	41' Silvani	Stadium: Balaídos; Referee: Carlos Megía Dávila

26 January 1997 21	Real Madrid	4 – 0	Celta Vigo	Madrid, Spain
	Carlos 20'; Redondo 54'; Raúl 69'; Šuker 74'	Report		Stadium: Santiago Bernabéu Stadium; Referee: Juan Ansuátegui Roca

1 February 1997 22	Celta Vigo	1 – 1	Atlético Madrid	Vigo, Spain
	Geli 59' (o.g.)	Report	83' Prodan	Stadium: Balaídos; Referee: Arturo Daudén Ibáñez

9 February 1997 23	Deportivo La Coruña	2 – 2	Celta Vigo	A Coruña, Spain
	Rivaldo 41'; Renaldo 54'	Report	20' Sánchez; 64' Mostovoi	Stadium: Estadio Riazor; Referee: José Manuel Andradas Asurmendi

16 February 1997 24	Celta Vigo	3 – 0	Hércules	Vigo, Spain
	Alejo 19'; Mostovoi 28'; Revivo 82'	Report		Stadium: Balaídos; Referee: César Barrenechea Montero

19 February 1997 25	Real Betis	1 – 1	Celta Vigo	Seville, Spain
	Alfonso Pérez 59'	Report	78' Mazinho	Stadium: Benito Villamarín; Referee: Antonio Llonch Andreu

23 February 1997 26	Celta Vigo	2 – 0	Rayo Vallecano	Vigo, Spain
	Gudelj 44'; Revivo 50'	Report		Stadium: Balaídos; Referee: José Prados García

2 March 1997 27	Real Oviedo	2 – 1	Celta Vigo	Oviedo, Spain
	Oli 49'; Maqueda 53'	Report	2' Mostovoi	Stadium: Estadio Carlos Tartiere; Referee: Antonio López Nieto

9 March 1997 28	Celta Vigo	2 – 2	Espanyol	Vigo, Spain
	Mostovoi 39'; Alejo 62'	Report	25' (o.g.) del Solar; 60' Lardín	Stadium: Balaídos; Referee: José María García-Aranda

16 March 1997 29	Racing Santander	1 – 0	Celta Vigo	Santander, Spain
	Txema Alonso 89'	Report		Stadium: El Sardinero; Referee: Juan Ansuátegui Roca

22 March 1997 30	Celta Vigo	1 – 1	Real Sociedad	Vigo, Spain
	Merino 31'	Report	14' Idiakez	Stadium: Balaídos; Referee: Manuel Mejuto González

30 March 1997 31	Real Zaragoza	1 – 1	Celta Vigo	Zaragoza, Spain
	Morientes 10'	Report	3' Moisés	Stadium: La Romareda; Referee: Carmelo Rodríguez Martel

5 April 1997 32	Celta Vigo	3 – 1	Tenerife	Vigo, Spain
	Merino 6'; Mostovoi 46'; Mazinho 69'	Report	31' Pinilla	Stadium: Balaídos; Referee: Celino Gracia Redondo

13 April 1997 33	Compostela	2 – 1	Celta Vigo	Santiago de Compostela, Spain
	Penev 38'; Ohen 60'	Report	33' Bajčetić	Stadium: Estadio Multiusos de San Lázaro; Referee: César Barrenechea Montero

16 April 1997 34	Celta Vigo	4 – 0	Logroñés	Vigo, Spain
	Dutuel 40'; Revivo 44'; Mazinho 80'; Geli 89'	Report		Stadium: Balaídos; Referee: José Núñez Manrique

20 April 1997 35	Sevilla	2 – 0	Celta de Vigo	Seville, Spain
	Oulida 29'; Prosinečki 72'	Report		Stadium: Ramón Sánchez Pizjuán; Referee: Victor José Esquinas Torres

4 May 1997 36	Celta Vigo	1 – 1	Valencia	Vigo, Spain
	Gudelj 2'	Report	48' Machado	Stadium: Balaídos; Referee: José Manuel Andradas Asurmendi

11 May 1997 37	Sporting de Gijón	2 – 1	Celta Vigo	Gijón, Spain
	Bango 50', 78'	Report	54' Gudelj	Stadium: El Molinón; Referee: Eduardo Iturralde González

19 May 1997 38	Celta Vigo	1 – 3	Barcelona	Vigo, Spain
	Revivo 58'	Report	29', 38' Óscar García; 64' Ronaldo	Stadium: Balaídos; Referee: Juan Ansuátegui Roca

25 May 1997 39	Real Valladolid	0 – 1	Celta Vigo	Valladolid, Spain
		Report	21' Moisés	Stadium: José Zorrilla; Referee: Juan Fernández Marín

1 June 1997 40	Celta Vigo	0 – 2	Athletic Bilbao	Vigo, Spain
		Report	65' Ziganda; 75' Etxeberria	Stadium: Balaídos; Referee: Fernando Carmona Méndez

15 June 1997 41	Extremadura	2 – 0	Celta Vigo	Almendralejo, Spain
	Pineda 51'; Silvani 86'	Report		Stadium: Estadio Francisco de la Hera; Referee: José Prados García

22 June 1997 42	Celta Vigo	4 – 0	Real Madrid	Vigo, Spain
	Gudelj 8', 10', 89'; Sánchez 48'	Report		Stadium: Balaídos; Referee: Juan Brito Arceo

=== Copa del Rey ===
==== Second round ====
6 November 1996 First leg	Racing de Ferrol	1 – 3	Celta Vigo	Ferrol, Spain
	Fran 41'	Report	6' Geli; 7' Gudelj; 69' Sánchez	Stadium: A Malata; Referee: José Núñez Manrique

26 November 1996 Second leg	Celta Vigo	1 – 1	Racing de Ferrol	Vigo, Spain
	Couñago 88'	Report	78' Prendes	Stadium: Balaídos; Referee: Antonio López Nieto

Celta Vigo won 4–2 on aggregate

==== Third round ====
8 January 1997 First leg	Celta Vigo	2 – 0	Logroñés	Vigo, Spain
	Prieto 50'; Sotero López 84' (o.g.)	Report		Stadium: Balaídos; Referee: José Prados García

15 January 1997 Second leg	Logroñés	2 – 2	Celta Vigo	Logroño, Spain
	Tejera 65'; Morales 88'	Report	2', 63' Revivo	Stadium: Estadio Las Gaunas; Referee: José Japón Sevilla

Celta Vigo won 4–2 on aggregate

==== Round of 16 ====
29 January 1997 First leg	Lleida	1 – 1	Celta Vigo	Lleida, Spain
21:00 CET	Julio Rodríguez 33'	Report	88' Prieto	Stadium: Camp d'Esports; Attendance: 3,500; Referee: Manuel Mejuto González

5 February 1997 Second leg	Celta Vigo	0 – 0	Lleida	Vigo, Spain
21:00 CET		Report		Stadium: Balaídos; Attendance: 9,000; Referee: Eduardo Iturralde González

1–1 on aggregate. Celta Vigo won on away goals

==== Quarter-finals ====
27 February 1997 First leg	Racing Santander	1 – 2	Celta Vigo	Santander, Spain
21:30 CET	Javi López 66'	Report	44' Mostovoi; 74' Revivo	Stadium: El Sardinero; Attendance: 18,000; Referee: Manuel Díaz Vega

13 March 1997 Second leg	Celta Vigo	1 – 0	Racing Santander	Vigo, Spain
20:00 CET	Ratković 80'	Report		Stadium: Balaídos; Attendance: 20,000; Referee: Juan Fernández Marín

Celta Vigo won 3–1 on aggregate

==== Semi-finals ====
25 March 1997 First leg	Real Betis	1 – 0	Celta Vigo	Seville, Spain
21:30 CET	Bjelica 71'	Report		Stadium: Benito Villamarín; Attendance: 28,000; Referee: José María García-Aranda

2 April 1997 Second leg	Celta Vigo	1 – 1	Real Betis	Vigo, Spain
21:30 CET	Ratković 33'	Report	87' Alexis Trujillo	Stadium: Balaídos; Attendance: 33,000; Referee: Victor José Esquinas Torres

Real Betis won 2–1 on aggregate
