= 1997–98 RC Celta de Vigo season =

Celta Vigo
1997–98 season
- President: Horacio Gómez
- Head coach: Javier Irureta
- Stadium: Balaídos
- La Liga: 6th (In 1998–99 UEFA Cup)
- Copa del Rey: Round of 16
- Top goalscorer: League: Juan Sánchez (9); All: Juan Sánchez (11)
Home colours	Away colours	Third colours

Celta Vigo contested La Liga and the Copa del Rey in the 1997–98 season. They placed 6th in La Liga, their best result since 1970–71. This qualified them for the 1998–99 UEFA Cup, which would be their first European participation for 27 years. They were eliminated in the Copa del Rey round of 16 by Real Mallorca.

== Squad ==
Note: Flags indicate national team as defined under FIFA eligibility rules; some limited exceptions apply. Players may hold more than one non-FIFA nationality.

No.	Pos.	Nation	Player
1	GK	FRA	Richard Dutruel
2	DF	ESP	Míchel Salgado
3	DF	ESP	Rafael Berges
4	DF	ESP	Patxi Salinas (captain)
5	DF	ESP	Óscar Vales
6	MF	BRA	Mazinho
7	MF	BIH	Milorad Ratković
8	MF	RUS	Valeri Karpin
9	MF	ISR	Haim Revivo
10	FW	BIH	Vladimir Gudelj
11	MF	ESP	Geli
15	MF	ESP	Ito

No.	Pos.	Nation	Player
16	DF	NOR	Dan Eggen
17	MF	FRA	Daniel Dutuel
18	FW	ESP	Juan Sánchez
19	DF	YUG	Goran Đorović
20	MF	RUS	Aleksandr Mostovoi
21	FW	POR	Jorge Cadete
22	DF	ESP	Josema
23	FW	ESP	Moisés
24	MF	POR	Bruno Caires
25	GK	ESP	José Luis Diezma
—	MF	ESP	Carlos Pérez

=== Transfers ===
In
Pos.	Name	from	Type
FW	Jorge Cadete	Celtic Glasgow	
MF	Dan Eggen	Brondby	
DF	Michel Salgado	UD Salamanca	loan ended
DF	Oscar Vales	Athletic Bilbao	
DF	Goran Djorovic	Crvena Zvezda	
MF	Valery Karpin	Valencia CF	
MF	Ito	Extremadura	
MF	Bruno Caires	Benfica	

Out
Pos.	Name	To	Type
MF	Jose del Solar	Valencia CF	
MF	Eusebio	Real Valladolid	
DF	Alejo	Elche	
MF	Angel Merino	UD Las Palmas	
DF	Borja Agirretxu	SD Compostela	
GK	Patxi Villanueva	Levante UD	
MF	Javi Gonzalez	Athletic Bilbao	
DF	Adriano Teixeira	Fluminense	loan

=== Left club during season ===
Note: Flags indicate national team as defined under FIFA eligibility rules; some limited exceptions apply. Players may hold more than one non-FIFA nationality.

No.	Pos.	Nation	Player
12	DF	ESP	Andoni Lakabeg (to Villarreal)
14	MF	YUG	Zoran Đorović (de-registered)

No.	Pos.	Nation	Player
26	DF	ESP	Francisco Noguerol (on loan to Pontevedra)

== Squad stats ==
Last updated on 16 February 2021.

No.	Pos	Nat	Player	Total		La Liga		Copa del Rey	
No.	Pos	Nat	Player	Apps	Goals	Apps	Goals	Apps	Goals
1	GK	(France) FRA	Richard Dutruel	40	0	36	0	4	0
2	DF	(Spain) ESP	Míchel Salgado	30	0	24+1	0	4+1	0
5	DF	(Spain) ESP	Óscar Vales	38	0	33+1	0	4	0
19	DF	(Federal Republic of Yugoslavia) YUG	Goran Đorović	30	1	26+1	1	3	0
3	DF	(Spain) ESP	Rafael Berges	30	3	28	3	2	0
8	MF	(Russia) RUS	Valeri Karpin	42	5	37	4	2+3	1
6	MF	(Brazil) BRA	Mazinho	41	2	37	1	1+3	1
9	MF	(Israel) ISR	Haim Revivo	38	7	36	7	2	0
15	MF	(Spain) ESP	Ito	37	1	28+6	1	1+2	0
20	MF	(Russia) RUS	Aleksandr Mostovoi	37	9	34	8	2+1	1
21	FW	(Portugal) POR	Jorge Cadete	30	7	24+5	7	0+1	0
25	GK	(Spain) ESP	José Luis Diezma	4	0	2	0	2	0
18	FW	(Spain) ESP	Juan Sánchez	37	11	18+13	9	5+1	2
4	DF	(Spain) ESP	Patxi Salinas	29	2	14+10	2	5	0
16	DF	(Norway) NOR	Dan Eggen	25	2	18+5	2	2	0
22	DF	(Spain) ESP	Josema	17	0	8+5	0	3+1	0
23	FW	(Spain) ESP	Moisés	20	7	4+11	5	5	2
11	MF	(Spain) ESP	Geli	25	0	4+18	0	3	0
17	MF	(France) FRA	Daniel Dutuel	15	0	4+8	0	3	0
24	MF	(Portugal) POR	Bruno Caires	9	0	1+3	0	5	0
10	FW	(Bosnia and Herzegovina) BIH	Vladimir Gudelj	23	6	2+17	2	4	4
7	MF	(Bosnia and Herzegovina) BIH	Milorad Ratković	9	0	0+5	0	4	0
	MF	(Spain) ESP	Carlos Pérez	0	0	0	0	0	0
Players who have left the club after the start of the season:
12	DF	(Spain) ESP	Andoni Lakabeg	3	0	0	0	0+3	0
14	MF	(Federal Republic of Yugoslavia) YUG	Zoran Đorović	0	0	0	0	0	0
26	DF	(Spain) ESP	Francisco Noguerol	0	0	0	0	0	0

== Results ==
=== La Liga ===
==== League table ====
Pos	Team	Pld	W	D	L	GF	GA	GD	Pts	Qualification or relegation
4	Real Madrid	38	17	12	9	63	45	+18	63 (Note: RMA 2–0 RSO; RSO 4–2 RMA)	Qualification for the Champions League group stage (Note: Real Madrid was qualified directly for the 1998–99 UEFA Champions League as holders.)
5	Mallorca	38	16	12	10	55	39	+16	60 (Note: MLL: 9 pts; CEL: 5 pts; ATM: 2 pts)	Qualification for the Cup Winners' Cup first round (Note: Since Barcelona, winners of 1997–98 Copa del Rey, was qualified for the 1998–99 UEFA Champions League, losing cup finalists RCD Mallorca earned a spot in the first round of the 1998–99 UEFA Cup Winners' Cup.)
6	Celta Vigo	38	17	9	12	54	47	+7	60	Qualification for the UEFA Cup first round
7	Atlético Madrid	38	16	12	10	79	56	+23	60	Qualification for the UEFA Cup first round
8	Real Betis	38	17	8	13	49	50	−1	59	Qualification for the UEFA Cup first round

Source: LFP
Rules for classification: 1) points; 2) head-to-head points; 3) head-to-head goal difference; 4) head-to-head goals scored; 5) goal difference; 6) number of goals scored.

==== Position by round ====
Round	1	2	3	4	5	6	7	8	9	10	11	12	13	14	15	16	17	18	19	20	21	22	23	24	25	26	27	28	29	30	31	32	33	34	35	36	37	38
Ground	H	A	H	A	H	A	H	A	H	A	H	A	H	A	H	A	A	H	A	A	H	A	H	A	H	A	H	A	H	A	H	A	H	A	H	H	A	H
Result	W	D	W	D	W	L	W	D	W	W	W	L	L	L	W	L	D	W	L	L	W	L	D	W	W	L	W	W	D	L	W	L	W	D	D	D	L	W
Position	7	10	4	4	3	5	5	6	4	3	3	3	5	6	6	6	6	4	7	7	6	6	7	7	5	6	5	3	3	4	4	5	5	6	6	7	8	6

Source: Competitive matches
A = Away; H = Home; W = Win; D = Draw; L = Loss; = Leader, 1998–99 UEFA Champions League Group stage; = 1998–99 UEFA Champions League Qualifying round; = 1998–99 UEFA Cup First round; = 1998 UEFA Intertoto Cup; = 1998–99 Segunda División

==== Matches ====
31 August 1997 1	Celta Vigo	2 – 1	Real Zaragoza	Vigo, Spain
	Karpin 76'; Salinas 87'	Report	55' González	Stadium: Balaídos; Referee: Victor José Esquinas Torres

7 September 1997 2	Espanyol	1 – 1	Celta Vigo	Barcelona, Spain
	Berges 83' (o.g.)	Report	55' Berges	Stadium: Estadi Olímpic de Montjuïc; Referee: Manuel Mejuto González

14 September 1997 3	Celta Vigo	2 – 0	Real Betis	Vigo, Spain
	Karpin 33'; Sánchez 89'	Report		Stadium: Balaídos; Referee: Carlos Megía Dávila

27 September 1997 4	Atlético Madrid	3 – 3	Celta Vigo	Madrid, Spain
	Vieri 75', 81' (pen.); Mari 77'	Report	2' Revivo; 56' Cadete; 89' Berges	Stadium: Estadio Vicente Calderón; Referee: José Manuel Andradas Asurmendi

5 October 1997 5	Celta Vigo	4 – 1	Salamanca	Vigo, Spain
	Cadete 4'; Mostovoi 22', 35'; Sánchez 86'	Report	62' Taira	Stadium: Balaídos; Referee: Celino Gracia Redondo

15 October 1997 6	Real Sociedad	2 – 1	Celta Vigo	San Sebastián, Spain
	G. Đorović 60' (o.g.); Kovačević 89' (pen.)	Report	44' (o.g.) Loren	Stadium: Anoeta; Referee: Fernando Carmona Méndez

19 October 1997 7	Celta Vigo	1 – 0	Valencia	Vigo, Spain
	Mostovoi 11' (pen.)	Report		Stadium: Balaídos; Referee: Arturo Daudén Ibáñez

25 October 1997 8	Deportivo La Coruña	1 – 1	Celta Vigo	A Coruña, Spain
	Luizão 31'	Report	37' Salinas	Stadium: Estadio Riazor; Referee: Juan Brito Arceo

2 November 1997 9	Celta Vigo	1 – 0	Sporting de Gijón	Vigo, Spain
	Cadete 56'	Report		Stadium: Balaídos; Referee: Miguel Pérez Lasa

9 November 1997 10	Tenerife	1 – 3	Celta Vigo	Santa Cruz de Tenerife, Spain
	Makaay 88'	Report	12', 71' Revivo; 89' Sánchez	Stadium: Heliodoro Rodríguez López; Referee: José Losantos Omar

12 November 1997 11	Celta Vigo	1 – 0	Real Mallorca	Vigo, Spain
	Eggen 74'	Report		Stadium: Balaídos; Referee: José María García-Aranda

16 November 1997 12	Barcelona	3 – 2	Celta Vigo	Barcelona, Spain
	Eggen 10' (o.g.); Rivaldo 60'; Pizzi 66'	Report	37' Cadete; 84' Sánchez	Stadium: Camp Nou; Referee: Antonio López Nieto

23 November 1997 13	Celta Vigo	1 – 2	Racing Santander	Vigo, Spain
	Mostovoi 41'	Report	51' Txema Alonso; 86' Beschastnykh	Stadium: Balaídos; Referee: Juan Ansuátegui Roca

30 November 1997 14	Real Madrid	3 – 1	Celta Vigo	Madrid, Spain
	Mijatović 44'; Raúl 66'; Seedorf 71'	Report	88' Gudelj	Stadium: Santiago Bernabéu Stadium; Referee: Miguel López López

7 December 1997 15	Celta Vigo	2 – 0	Real Valladolid	Vigo, Spain
	Cadete 8'; Karpin 40'	Report		Stadium: Balaídos; Referee: Manuel Mejuto González

13 December 1997 16	Athletic Bilbao	2 – 1	Celta Vigo	Bilbao, Spain
	Alkorta 88'; Ríos 89'	Report	44' Revivo	Stadium: San Mamés; Referee: Manuel Díaz Vega

17 December 1997 17	Compostela	0 – 0	Celta Vigo	Santiago de Compostela, Spain
		Report		Stadium: Estadio Multiusos de San Lázaro; Referee: Carlos Megía Dávila

21 December 1997 18	Celta Vigo	3 – 0	Real Oviedo	Vigo, Spain
	Cadete 64'; Revivo 83'; Karpin 89'	Report		Stadium: Balaídos; Referee: José Prados García

4 January 1998 19	Mérida	4 – 0	Celta Vigo	Mérida, Spain
	Marcos 8'; Ruano 23'; Sabas 79'; Correa 88'	Report		Stadium: Estadio Romano; Referee: Alfonso Pérez

11 January 1998 20	Real Zaragoza	1 – 0	Celta Vigo	Zaragoza, Spain
	Acuña 58'	Report		Stadium: La Romareda; Referee: Carmelo Rodríguez Martel

17 January 1998 21	Celta Vigo	1 – 0	Espanyol	Vigo, Spain
	Sánchez 29'	Report		Stadium: Balaídos; Referee: Juan Fernández Marín

25 January 1998 22	Real Betis	2 – 0	Celta Vigo	Seville, Spain
	Jarni 31'; Alexis Trujillo 57'	Report		Stadium: Estadio Manuel Ruiz de Lopera; Referee: José María García-Aranda

1 February 1998 23	Celta Vigo	1 – 1	Atlético Madrid	Vigo, Spain
	Ito 29'	Report	25' (pen.) Juninho	Stadium: Balaídos; Referee: Celino Gracia Redondo

8 February 1998 24	Salamanca	0 – 1	Celta Vigo	Villares de la Reina, Spain
		Report	24' Sánchez	Stadium: Estadio Helmántico; Referee: Manuel Mejuto González

15 February 1998 25	Celta Vigo	2 – 1	Real Sociedad	Vigo, Spain
	G. Đorović 42'; Revivo 87'	Report	15' Gracia	Stadium: Balaídos; Referee: Antonio López Nieto

22 February 1998 26	Valencia	2 – 1	Celta Vigo	Valencia, Spain
	Farinós 42'; Mendieta 52'	Report	65' Cadete	Stadium: Mestalla Stadium; Referee: José Manuel Andradas Asurmendi

1 March 1998 27	Celta Vigo	2 – 1	Deportivo La Coruña	Vigo, Spain
	Mostovoi 70'; Ramis 72' (o.g.)	Report	6' Ramis	Stadium: Balaídos; Referee: Manuel Díaz Vega

8 March 1998 28	Sporting de Gijón	0 – 1	Celta Vigo	Gijón, Spain
		Report	72' Moisés	Stadium: El Molinón; Referee: Alfonso Pérez

15 March 1998 29	Celta Vigo	0 – 0	Tenerife	Vigo, Spain
		Report		Stadium: Balaídos; Referee: Miguel Pérez Lasa

22 March 1998 30	Real Mallorca	4 – 2	Celta Vigo	Palma de Mallorca, Spain
	Ezquerro 20'; Mena 44' (pen.); Amato 75'; Stanković 85'	Report	53' Eggen; 56' Sánchez	Stadium: Lluís Sitjar; Referee: José Japón Sevilla

29 March 1998 31	Celta Vigo	3 – 1	Barcelona	Vigo, Spain
	Revivo 21'; Mostovoi 32'; Mazinho 70'	Report	27' Enrique	Stadium: Balaídos; Referee: José Prados García

5 April 1998 32	Racing Santander	2 – 1	Celta Vigo	Santander, Spain
	Correa 69'; Beschastnykh 74'	Report	52' Sánchez	Stadium: El Sardinero; Referee: Celino Gracia Redondo

11 April 1998 33	Celta Vigo	2 – 1	Real Madrid	Vigo, Spain
	Mostovoi 37', 56' (pen.)	Report	44' (pen.) Hierro	Stadium: Balaídos; Referee: Eduardo Iturralde González

19 April 1998 34	Real Valladolid	0 – 0	Celta Vigo	Valladolid, Spain
		Report		Stadium: José Zorrilla; Referee: Carlos Megía Dávila

26 April 1998 35	Celta Vigo	1 – 1	Athletic Bilbao	Vigo, Spain
	Moisés 60'	Report	5' J. Etxeberria	Stadium: Balaídos; Referee: Carmelo Rodríguez Martel

3 May 1998 36	Celta Vigo	3 – 3	Compostela	Vigo, Spain
	Berges 9'; Sánchez 61'; Moisés 89' (pen.)	Report	27' Chiba; 37' Lekumberri; 80' Sion	Stadium: Balaídos; Referee: Arturo Daudén Ibáñez

10 May 1998 37	Real Oviedo	3 – 1	Celta Vigo	Oviedo, Spain
	Salinas 8' (o.g.); Iglesias 56'; Losada 89'	Report	87' Moisés	Stadium: Estadio Carlos Tartiere; Referee: Victor José Esquinas Torres

15 May 1998 38	Celta Vigo	2 – 0	Mérida	Vigo, Spain
	Moisés 12'; Gudelj 58'	Report		Stadium: Balaídos; Referee: José María García-Aranda

=== Copa del Rey ===
==== Second round ====
8 October 1997 First leg	Ourense	0 – 1	Celta Vigo	Ourense, Spain
		Report	76' Mazinho	Stadium: O Couto; Referee: Juan Fernández Marín

28 October 1997 Second leg	Celta Vigo	2 – 1 (a.e.t.)	Ourense	Vigo, Spain
	Gudelj 106', 111'	Report	11' (o.g.) Eggen	Stadium: Balaídos; Referee: José Japón Sevilla

Celta Vigo won 3–1 on aggregate

==== Third round ====
3 December 1997 First leg	Recreativo de Huelva	0 – 1	Celta Vigo	Huelva, Spain
		Report	78' (pen.) Gudelj	Stadium: Estadio Colombino; Referee: Victor José Esquinas Torres

7 January 1998 Second leg	Celta Vigo	5 – 2	Recreativo de Huelva	Vigo, Spain
	Gudelj 19'; Sánchez 43', 59'; Moisés 53'; Karpin 87'	Report	57' Raúl; 89' Pastor	Stadium: Balaídos; Referee: Fernando Carmona Méndez

Celta Vigo won 6–2 on aggregate

==== Round of 16 ====
14 January 1998 First leg	Real Mallorca	1 – 0	Celta Vigo	Palma de Mallorca, Spain
21:15 CET	Marcelino 84'	Report		Stadium: Lluís Sitjar; Attendance: 10,357; Referee: Eduardo Iturralde González

21 January 1998 Second leg	Celta Vigo	2 – 1	Real Mallorca	Vigo, Spain
21:00 CET	Mostovoi 42'; Moisés 52' (pen.)	Report	77' Ezquerro	Stadium: Balaídos; Attendance: 23,000; Referee: Juan Brito Arceo

2–2 on aggregate. Real Mallorca won on away goals
