= 1998–99 Celta de Vigo season =

Celta Vigo
1998–99 season
- Chairman: Horacio Gomez
- Manager: Víctor Fernández
- La Liga: 5th
- Copa del Rey: Round of 16
- UEFA Cup: Quarter-final
- Top goalscorer: League: Lyuboslav Penev (14); All: Lyuboslav Penev (18)
Home colours	Away colours	Third colours

Celta Vigo contested La Liga, Copa del Rey and the UEFA Cup in the 1998–99 season, which saw the club reach the quarter-finals of the UEFA Cup and narrowly missing out on qualification for the Champions League.

== Squad ==
Note: Flags indicate national team as defined under FIFA eligibility rules; some limited exceptions apply. Players may hold more than one non-FIFA nationality.

No.	Pos.	Nation	Player
1	GK	FRA	Richard Dutruel
2	DF	ESP	Míchel Salgado
3	DF	ESP	Rafael Berges
4	DF	ARG	Fernando Cáceres
5	DF	ESP	Óscar Vales
6	MF	BRA	Mazinho
7	MF	ESP	Tomás
8	MF	RUS	Valery Karpin
9	MF	ISR	Haim Revivo
10	FW	BIH	Vladimir Gudelj
11	FW	NED	Jordi Cruyff

No.	Pos.	Nation	Player
13	GK	ESP	José Manuel Pinto
14	FW	BUL	Lyuboslav Penev
15	DF	ESP	Fran Cainzos
16	DF	NOR	Dan Eggen
18	FW	ESP	Juan Sánchez
19	DF	YUG	Goran Đorović
20	MF	RUS	Alexandr Mostovoi
22	DF	ESP	Josema
23	MF	FRA	Claude Makélélé
24	MF	POR	Bruno Caires
26	GK	ESP	Roberto

=== Transfers ===
In
Pos.	Name	from	Type
MF	Claude Makélélé	Olympique Marseille	
DF	Fernando Cáceres	Valencia CF	
FW	Lyuboslav Penev	SD Compostela	
GK	José Manuel Pinto	Real Betis	
MF	Tomás	Sporting Gijon	

Out
Pos.	Name	To	Type
MF	Ito	Real Betis	
GK	José Luis Diezma	CD Numancia	
DF	Patxi Salinas		retired
MF	Geli	Racing Santander	
MF	Daniel Dutuel	Real Valladolid	
FW	Moisés	Villarreal FC	
MF	Milorad Ratković	Sevilla CF	

==== Winter ====
In
Pos.	Name	from	Type
FW	Jordi Cruyff	Manchester United	loan

Out
Pos.	Name	To	Type
MF	Zoran Đorović		released
FW	Jorge Cadete	Benfica	

== Competition ==
=== La Liga ===
==== League table ====
Pos	Team	Pld	W	D	L	GF	GA	GD	Pts	Qualification or relegation
3	Mallorca	38	20	6	12	48	31	+17	66	Qualification for the Champions League third qualifying round
4	Valencia	38	19	8	11	63	39	+24	65	Qualification for the Champions League third qualifying round
5	Celta Vigo	38	17	13	8	69	41	+28	64	Qualification for the UEFA Cup first round
6	Deportivo La Coruña	38	17	12	9	55	43	+12	63	Qualification for the UEFA Cup first round
7	Espanyol	38	16	13	9	49	38	+11	61	Qualification for the Intertoto Cup third round

Source: LFP
Rules for classification: 1) points; 2) head-to-head points; 3) head-to-head goal difference; 4) head-to-head goals scored; 5) goal difference; 6) number of goals scored.

==== Results by round ====
Round	1	2	3	4	5	6	7	8	9	10	11	12	13	14	15	16	17	18	19	20	21	22	23	24	25	26	27	28	29	30	31	32	33	34	35	36	37	38
Ground	A	H	A	H	A	H	A	H	A	H	A	H	A	H	A	H	H	A	H	H	A	H	A	H	A	H	A	H	A	H	A	H	A	H	A	A	H	A
Result	D	D	D	D	W	W	W	D	W	W	L	D	D	W	L	W	W	W	L	L	W	L	D	D	W	W	W	D	W	D	D	W	L	D	W	W	L	L
Position	7	12	14	12	7	5	3	4	3	1	2	2	3	2	2	2	2	1	2	4	2	3	3	4	3	3	2	3	2	2	2	2	4	4	4	3	4	5

Source: https://www.worldfootball.net/competition/ro11027/md38/results-and-standings/
A = Away; H = Home; W = Win; D = Draw; L = Loss; = Leader, 1999–2000 UEFA Champions League group stage; = 1999–2000 UEFA Champions League group stage; = 1999–2000 UEFA Champions League qualifying round; = 1999–2000 UEFA Cup; = 1999 UEFA Intertoto Cup; = 1999–2000 Segunda División

=== Matches ===
30 August 1998 1	Celta	0–0	Deportivo La Coruña	Vigo
				Stadium: Balaidos

12 September 1998 2	Villarreal	1–1	Celta	Vilareal
	Craioveanu 9'		32' Penev	Stadium: Estadio de la Ceramica

19 September 1998 3	Celta	0–0	Real Valladolid	Vigo
				Stadium: Balaidos

26 September 1998 4	FC Barcelona	2–2	Celta	Barcelona
	Kluivert 38, 57'		43' Salgado; 90' Mostovoi	Stadium: Camp Nou

4 October 1998 5	Celta	3–2	Athletic Bilbao	Vigo
	Cáceres 17'; Penev 31', 63' (pen.)		Guerrero 55'; Urzaiz 90'	Stadium: Balaidos

17 October 1998 6	Real Betis	0–3	Celta	Sevilla
			51' Makélélé; 66' Sánchez; 85' Cadete	Stadium: Benito Villamarin

24 October 1998 7	Celta	2–0	Real Zaragoza	Vigo
	Juan Sánchez 43, 69'			Stadium: Balaidos

31 October 1998 8	Racing Santander	2–2	Celta	Santander
	Víctor 53', 86' (pen.)		45' Sánchez; 76' Berges	Stadium: El Sardinero

8 November 1998 9	Celta	5–1	Extremadura	Vigo
	Mostovoi 47, 66'; Sánchez 57'; Tomás 83'		Manuel 68'	Stadium: Balaidos

14 November 1998 10	Real Madrid	1–2	Celta	Madrid
	R. Carlos 62'		Penev 21' (pen.); Makélélé 54'	Stadium: Santiago Bernabeu

21 November 1998 11	Deportivo Alavés	2–0	Celta	Alaves
	Gerard 28'; Sivori 69'

29 November 1998 12	Celta	2–2	Valencia	Vigo
	Mostovoi 34'; Sánchez 56'		Popescu 23'; Ilie 66'	Stadium: Balaidos

5 December 1998 13	Salamanca	1–1	Celta	Villares de la Reina
	Cardetti 86'		Mazinho 5'	Stadium: Helmantico

13 December 1998 14	Celta	2–0	Espanyol	Vigo
	Penev 4'; Salgado 13'			Stadium: Balaidos

20 December 1998 15	Real Sociedad	2–0	Celta	San Sebastian
	Kovačević 36, 87'			Stadium: Anoeta

3 January 1999 16	Celta	6–2	Real Oviedo	Vigo
	Revivo 25, 84'; Karpin 32'; Penev 39, 75'; Sánchez 63'		scorer unknown Møller 90'	Stadium: Balaidos

10 January 1999 17	Tenerife	0–2	Celta	Santa Cruz
			Karpin 65'; Mazinho 83'	Stadium: Heliodoro Rodriguez

16 January 1999 18	Celta	4–2	Mallorca	Vigo
	Karpin 22, 56'; Đorović 86'; Revivo 90'		A. López 22'; Biagini 51'	Stadium: Balaidos

24 January 1999 19	Atlético Madrid	2–1	Celta	Madrid
	Serena 14'; Correa 62'		Penev 86' (pen.)	Stadium: Vicente Calderon

31 January 1999 20	Deportivo La Coruña	2–1	Celta	La Coruña
	Pauleta 9'; Turu Flores 44'		80' Juan Sánchez	Stadium: Riazor

7 February 1999 21	Celta	4–1	Villarreal	Vigo
	Sánchez 42'; Salgado 81'; Penev 87' (pen.); Revivo 90'		Moisés 27'	Stadium: Balaidos

14 February 1999 22	Real Valladolid	2–1	Celta	Valladolid
	Caminero 27'; Alberto 78'		Revivo 60'	Stadium: Jose Zorrilla

20 February 1999 23	Celta	0–0	Barcelona	Vigo
				Stadium: Balaidos

27 February 1999 24	Athletic Bilbao	0–0	Celta	Bilbao
				Stadium: San Mamés

7 March 1999 25	Celta	4–0	Real Betis	Vigo
	Gudelj 1, 80'; Tomás 6'; Revivo 70'			Stadium: Balaidos

13 March 1999 26	Real Zaragoza	0–1	Celta	Zaragoza
			Revivo 20'	Stadium: La Romareda

21 March 1999 27	Celta	3–0	Racing Santander	Vigo
	Mazinho 36'; Sánchez 61'; Mostovoi 81'			Stadium: Balaidos

4 April 1999 28	Extremadura	1–1	Celta	Almendralejo
	Velamazán 59'		Sánchez 65' (pen.)	Stadium: Francisco de la Hera

11 April 1999 29	Celta	5–1	Real Madrid	Vigo
	Penev 7, 15, 61'; Mazinho 11'; Mostovoi 33'		Morientes 32'	Stadium: Balaidos

18 April 1999 30	Celta	1–1	Deportivo Alavés	Vigo
	Sánchez 55'		Pablo 53'	Stadium: Balaidos

24 April 1999 31	Valencia	2–2	Celta	Valencia
	Vlaović 12'; Farinós 90 +'		Sánchez 41'; Karpin 90'	Stadium: Mestalla

2 May 1999 32	Celta	1–0	Salamanca	Vigo
	Revivo 62'			Stadium: Balaidos

9 May 1999 33	RCD Espanyol	3–0	Celta	Barcelona
	de Lucas 59'; Gălcă 74'; Tamudo 77' (pen.)			Stadium: Olímpic

16 May 1999 34	Celta	2–2	Real Sociedad	Vigo
	Karpin 35'; Tomás 69'		Kovačević 10'; Idiakez 16'	Stadium: Balaidos

23 May 1999 35	Real Oviedo	1–3	Celta	Oviedo
	Dubovský 50'		Penev 34', 67' (pen.); Cruyff 87'	Stadium: Carlos Tartiere

30 May 1999 36	Celta	2–0	Tenerife	Vigo
	Revivo 43'; Karpin 66'			Stadium: Balaidos

13 June 1999 37	Mallorca	2–0	Celta	Palma de Mallorca
	Ibagaza 34'; Stanković 90'			Stadium: Llius Sitjar

19 June 1999 38	Celta	0–1	Atlético Madrid	Vigo
			9' Solari	Stadium: Balaidos

=== Copa del Rey ===
==== Eightfinals ====
20 January 1999	Celta Vigo	0-1	Deportivo	Vigo
		Report		Stadium: Balaídos

3 February 1999	Deportivo	1-1	Celta Vigo	La Coruña
		Report		Stadium: Riazor

=== UEFA Cup ===
==== First round ====
15 September 1998	Argeş Pitești (Greece)	0–1	(Spain) Celta
			Sánchez 25'

29 September 1998	Celta (Spain)	7–0	(Greece) Argeş Pitești
	Penev 6, 13, 26'; Mazinho 16'; Sánchez 82'; Tomás 87, 90'

==== Second round ====
20 October 1998	Celta (Spain)	0–1	(England) Aston Villa
			Joachim 15'

3 November 1998	Aston Villa (England)	1–3	(Spain) Celta
	Collymore 30' (pen.)		Sánchez 26'; Mostovoi 34'; Penev 48'

==== Eightfinals ====
24 November 1998	Celta (Spain)	3–1	(England) Liverpool
	Mostovoi 49'; Karpin 56'; Gudelj 90'		Owen 35'

8 December 1998	Liverpool (England)	0–1	(Spain) Celta
			Revivo 57'

==== Quarter-finals ====
2 March 1999	Marseille (France)	2–1	(Spain) Celta
	Maurice 33, 68'		Mostovoi 54'

16 March 1999	Celta (Spain)	0–0	(France) Marseille

== Statistics ==
=== Players statistics ===
No.	Pos	Nat	Player	Total		La Liga		Copa del Rey		UEFA Cup	
No.	Pos	Nat	Player	Apps	Goals	Apps	Goals	Apps	Goals	Apps	Goals
1	GK	(France) FRA	Dutruel	47	-46	37	-39	2	-2	8	-5
2	DF	(Spain) ESP	Salgado	44	3	35	3	2	0	7	0
4	DF	(Argentina) ARG	Caceres	46	2	36	1	2	1	8	0
19	DF	(Federal Republic of Yugoslavia) YUG	Djorovic	39	1	31	1	1	0	7	0
5	DF	(Spain) ESP	Vales	28	0	16+8	0	1	0	3	0
8	MF	(Russia) RUS	Karpin	42	9	34	8	1	0	7	1
23	MF	(France) FRA	Makelele	44	2	34+2	2	1	0	7	0
6	MF	(Brazil) BRA	Mazinho	40	5	31	4	1	0	8	1
20	MF	(Russia) RUS	Mostovoi	41	9	30+3	6	1	0	7	3
14	FW	(Bulgaria) BUL	Penev	41	18	30+2	14	1+1	0	7	4
18	FW	(Spain) ESP	Sánchez	46	16	24+12	13	2	0	5+3	3
13	GK	(Spain) ESP	Pinto	1	-2	1	-2	0	0	0	0
7	MF	(Spain) ESP	Tomás	45	5	17+18	3	1+1	0	2+6	2
9	MF	(Israel) ISR	Revivo	33	10	20+6	9	2	0	5	1
3	DF	(Spain) ESP	Berges	21	1	16+2	1	1	0	2	0
22	DF	(Spain) ESP	Josema	24	0	14+4	0	0+1	0	4+1	0
16	DF	(Norway) NOR	Eggen	20	0	7+9	0	1	0	1+2	0
10	FW	(Bosnia and Herzegovina) BIH	Gudelj	17	3	3+11	2	0	0	0+3	1
11	FW	(Netherlands) NED	Cruijff	10	1	1+7	1	0+2	0		
15	DF	(Spain) ESP	Cainzos	3	0	0+2	0	0	0	0+1	0
24	MF	(Portugal) POR	Caires	15	0	1+10	0	1	0	0+3	0
26	GK	(Spain) ESP	Roberto								
11	FW	(Portugal) POR	Cadete	11	1	0+7	1	0	0	0+4	0
17	DF	(Brazil) BRA	Adriano	1	1	0+1	1				
21	MF	(Federal Republic of Yugoslavia) YUG	Djorovic	0	0	0	0				

- Source: https://www.bdfutbol.com/en/t/t1998-9911.html
