= Pablo Couñago =

Spanish footballer

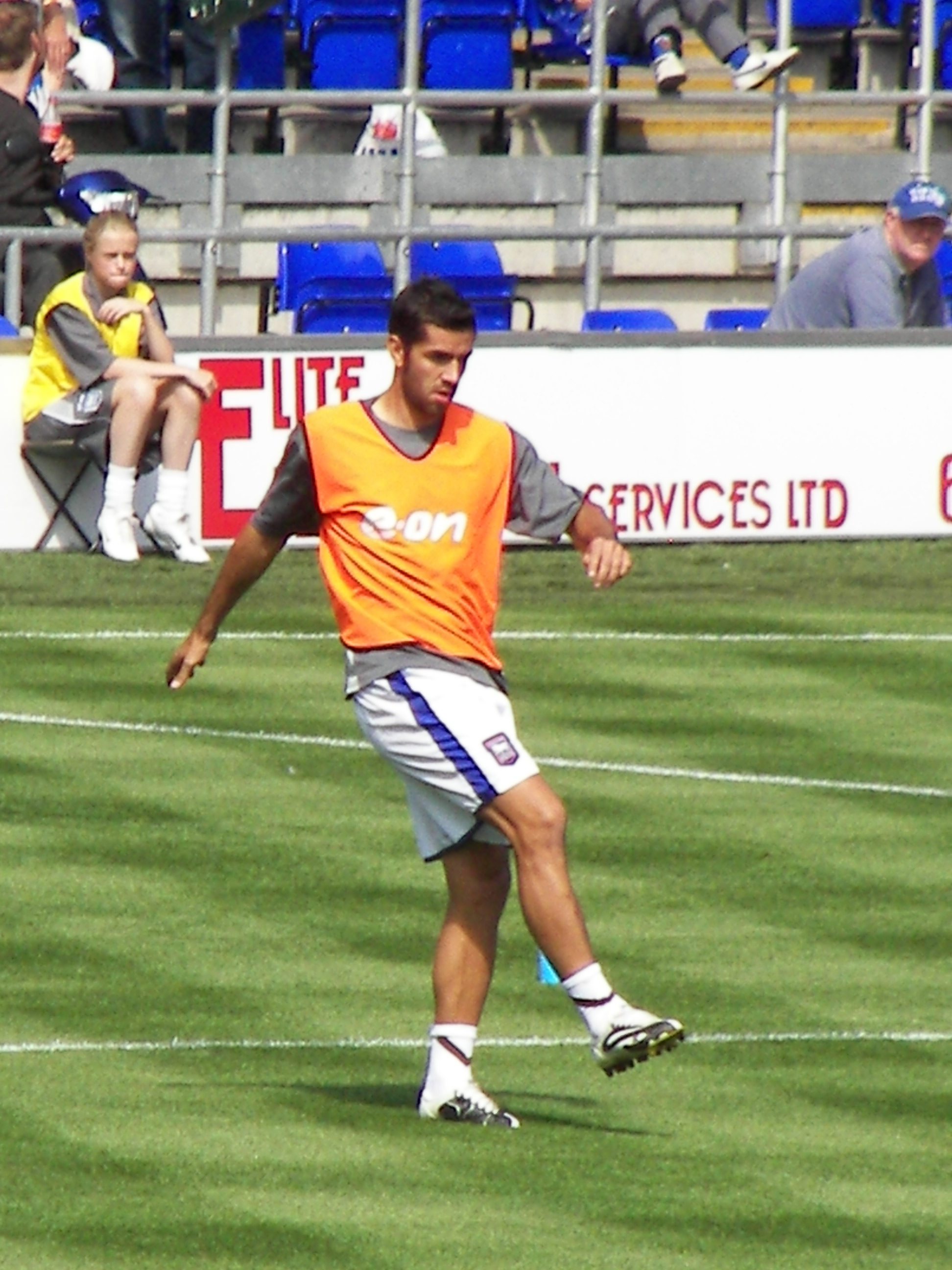
- Couñago with Ipswich Town in 2007

Personal information
- Full name: Pablo González Couñago
- Date of birth: 9 August 1979 (age 47)
- Place of birth: Redondela, Spain
- Height: 1.80 m (5 ft 11 in)
- Position: Striker

Youth career
- 1987–1994: Casa Paco
- 1994–1996: Celta

Senior career*
Years	Team	Apps	(Gls)
1996–1998	Celta B	63	(28)
1996–2001	Celta	8	(0)
1998	→ Numancia (loan)	13	(1)
1999–2000	→ Recreativo (loan)	26	(4)
2001–2005	Ipswich Town	100	(31)
2005–2007	Málaga	54	(10)
2007–2011	Ipswich Town	114	(23)
2010–2011	→ Crystal Palace (loan)	30	(2)
2012	Đồng Tâm Long An	9	(5)
2012–2013	Kitchee	13	(7)
2013–2014	Choco	17	(15)
2014	Honka	8	(5)
2015–2016	PK-35	34	(17)
2016–2017	Alondras	21	(11)
2017–2018	Choco	22	(3)
Total		532	(162)

International career
1995–1996	Spain U16	6	(2)
1997	Spain U17	5	(1)
1997–1998	Spain U18	10	(6)
1998–1999	Spain U20	13	(6)
1999–2001	Spain U21	15	(9)
2006	Galicia	1	(0)
Medal record
Men's football
Representing Spain
FIFA U-20 World Cup
Winner	1999 Nigeria
- * Club domestic league appearances and goals

Pablo González Couñago (born 9 August 1979) is a Spanish former professional footballer who played as a striker.

After appearing in 35 La Liga matches for Celta and Málaga, scoring three goals, he spent the bulk of his career in England with Ipswich Town, where he managed 62 competitive goals in two spells. He also played in Vietnam, Hong Kong and Finland.

Couñago represented Spain in the 1999 World Youth Championship, winning the tournament.

== Club career ==
=== Celta ===
Born in Redondela, Province of Pontevedra, Galicia, and a product of local Celta de Vigo's youth academy, Couñago made his professional debut in the Segunda División, loaned to Numancia. He returned in January 1999 to his first club, failing to appear in La Liga in his first spell. He scored on his competitive debut on 26 November 1996 when he was just 17, equalising a 1–1 home draw against neighbours Racing de Ferrol in the second round of the Copa del Rey.

In the 1999–2000 season, Couñago returned to the second tier yet on loan, now with Recreativo de Huelva, after which he returned to Celta still with no impact. He made 18 official appearances for the latter, 12 from the bench and two being in the 2000–01 UEFA Cup where he totalled 63 minutes.

=== Ipswich Town ===
After impressing in a Spain under-21 4–0 win over England at Birmingham City's ground, Couñago was signed by Ipswich Town in May 2001, as manager George Burley had been in the stands watching his performance; the player, who was out of contract, agreed to a four-year deal. He failed to find the net in his debut campaign while totalling 19 games, being relegated from the Premier League.

Couñago scored a career-best 21 times in all competitions in 2002–03. Highlights included braces in victories against Leicester City (6–1 at home), Sheffield Wednesday (2–1, home), Walsall (3–2, home), Gillingham (3–1 away) and Coventry City (4–2, away); he added a hat-trick in the 8–1 home thrashing of Avenir Beggen in the qualifying round of the UEFA Cup (his team had been relegated, but still qualified for Europe via the fair play award), being voted Players' Player of the Year.

On 14 October 2003, Couñago netted twice in a 6–1 win over Burnley at Portman Road. He repeated the feat on 26 December to help to defeat hosts West Ham United 2–1, scoring 12 times overall as the Blues reached the playoffs after a fifth-place finish.

Couñago did not feature as regularly during the 2004–05 season due to the form of Darren Bent and Shefki Kuqi. He scored three goals in four league starts and 15 substitute appearances, with Ipswich again losing out in the play-off semi-finals to West Ham.

=== Málaga ===
Couñago joined Málaga ahead of 2005–06, making his debut on 28 August as a late replacement in a 2–0 away loss against his former employers Celta. He scored three times in 27 matches, as the Andalusians finished bottom of the table.

Couñago produced more the following campaign, but the club failed to regain its top-flight status.

=== Return to Ipswich ===
After being released by Málaga, Couñago re-signed for Ipswich on a two-year deal on 13 July 2007, extendable to three in case of promotion. He scored a return debut goal in the 4–1 home win against Sheffield Wednesday, and added two the following month to help dispose of Coventry City with the same result and at the same venue. He totalled 12 from 45 matches in the first season in his second spell; an audacious backheel in a 3–1 defeat to Charlton Athletic on 8 December 2007 was voted goal of the season at Town's awards night.

Couñago started his 192nd league game for the club on 21 February 2009, and scored his 50th league goal in a 3–1 victory at promotion rivals Queen Park Rangers. In the summer of 2009, he turned down the chance to join Swansea City following the arrival of Roy Keane as manager, and saw his playing time significantly decrease under the latter, who claimed the Spaniard was "dead lazy" during their time together.

On 20 August 2010, Couñago joined Championship side Crystal Palace on a season-long loan, reuniting with former Ipswich boss Burley. He scored his first goal on 6 November, in a 2–1 loss away to Middlesbrough.

In June 2011, aged 31, Couñago was released by Ipswich Town. Over two spells, he recorded 243 appearances and scored 62 goals.

=== Later career ===
Subsequently, Couñago spent five months with Đồng Tâm Long An in Vietnam, helping the club promote to the V-League. On 2 October 2012, he joined Hong Kong First Division League's Kitchee for an undisclosed fee; he made his debut for his new team five days later, coming on at the hour mark of a 4–1 victory over Yokohama Hong Kong where his compatriot Yago González scored twice.

Couñago scored ten times from 27 competitive games in his only season, and his 30-yard shot against Sun Pegasus helped his team to win the Hong Kong FA Cup, while he also played a part in their quarter-final run in the AFC Cup. In May 2014, after one year with Choco in the Tercera División, he signed for Honka of the Finnish Veikkausliiga.

Couñago announced his retirement in June 2018 at age 38, following one-year stints in the Spanish fourth tier with Alondras and Choco.

== International career ==
Couñago was joint-top scorer at the 1999 FIFA World Youth Championship with five goals, as the Spain under-20 team won the tournament in Nigeria. In the following two years, he appeared and scored regularly for the under-21 side.

In December 2006, Couñago played for the Galicia unofficial team in a friendly against Ecuador.

== Personal life ==
Couñago's son, Iago, was born in April 2008.

== Career statistics ==
Appearances and goals by club, season and competition
Club	Season	League			Cup		Other		Total	
Club	Season	Division	Apps	Goals	Apps	Goals	Apps	Goals	Apps	Goals
Celta	1996–97	La Liga	0	0	1	1	—		1	1
Celta	1997–98	La Liga	0	0	0	0	—		0	0
Celta	1998–99	La Liga	0	0	0	0	0	0	0	0
Celta	1999–00	La Liga	0	0	0	0	0	0	0	0
Celta	2000–01	La Liga	8	0	2	0	7 (Note: Appearances in UEFA Intertoto Cup and UEFA Cup)	1	17	1
Celta	Total		8	0	3	1	7	1	18	2
Numancia (loan)	1998–99	Segunda División	13	1	6	2	—		19	3
Recreativo (loan)	1999–2000	Segunda División	26	4	2	0	—		28	4
Ipswich Town	2001–02	Premier League	13	0	2	0	4 (Note: Appearances in UEFA Cup)	0	19	0
Ipswich Town	2002–03	First Division	39	17	4	1	5	3	48	21
Ipswich Town	2003–04	First Division	29	11	4	1	—		33	12
Ipswich Town	2004–05	Championship	19	3	3	0	—		22	3
Ipswich Town	Total		100	31	13	2	9	3	122	36
Málaga	2005–06	La Liga	27	3	1	0	—		28	3
Málaga	2006–07	Segunda División	27	7	3	0	—		30	7
Málaga	Total		54	10	4	0	0	0	58	10
Ipswich Town	2007–08	Championship	43	12	2	0	—		45	12
Ipswich Town	2008–09	Championship	44	9	3	2	—		47	11
Ipswich Town	2009–10	Championship	27	2	2	1	—		29	3
Ipswich Town	2010–11	Championship	0	0	0	0	—		0	0
Ipswich Town	Total		114	23	7	3	0	0	121	26
Crystal Palace (loan)	2010–11	Championship	30	2	2	0	—		32	2
Đồng Tâm Long An	2012	V.League 2	9	5			—		9	5
Kitchee	2012–13	First Division League	13	7	7	1	7 (Note: Appearances in AFC Cup)	2	27	10
Honka	2014	Veikkausliiga	8	5	0	0	—		8	5
PK-35	2015	Ykkönen	25	17	1	2 (Note: Appearances in Veikkausliiga promotion play-offs)	2	1	28	20
Career total			400	105	45	11	25	7	470	123

== Honours ==
Celta

- UEFA Intertoto Cup: 2000
- Copa del Rey runner-up: 2000–01

Đồng Tâm Long An

- V.League 2: 2012

Kitchee

- Hong Kong FA Cup: 2012–13

Spain U20

- FIFA U-20 World Cup: 1999

Individual

- FIFA U-20 World Cup Golden Shoe: 1999
- Ipswich Town top scorer: 2002–03 (21 goals)
- Ipswich Town Players' Player of the Year: 2002–03
- Ipswich Town Goal of the Season: 2007–08
