= Patxi Villanueva =

Spanish footballer and goalkeeping coach

Personal information
- Full name: Francisco Villanueva Medina
- Date of birth: 27 July 1965 (age 61)
- Place of birth: Marcilla, Spain
- Height: 1.83 m (6 ft 0 in)
- Position: Goalkeeper

Youth career
- –1983: Celta Vigo

Senior career*
Years	Team	Apps	(Gls)
1981–1997	Celta Vigo	71	(0)
1997–1998	Levante	36	(0)
1998–2000	Gondomar		
2000–2001	Peña Sport	21	(0)
Total		128	(0)

Managerial career
- 2010–2014: Celta Vigo (goalkeeping coach)
- * Club domestic league appearances and goals

Francisco Villanueva Medina (born 27 July 1965), known as Patxi Villanueva, is a Spanish retired footballer who played as a goalkeeper, and later worked as a goalkeeping coach. He spent the vast majority of his career at Celta Vigo, which included making 32 La Liga appearances for the club.

== Playing career ==
Villanueva was born in Marcilla in the province and autonomous community of Navarre, but began his career in the youth department of Galician club Celta Vigo, where he would spend the best of part two decades. He became the second youngest player in Celta's history when he made his debut on 24 May 1981 at the age of 15 years, 9 months and 28 days. Villanueva played the first 45 minutes against Logroñés at Estadio Las Gaunas, being replaced by Joan Capó at half time with Celta 2–0 down. The visitors recovered in the second half to draw 3–3, in what was the last game of a Segunda División B campaign in which they topped their group and earned promotion to the Segunda División. The only younger player to make a first team appearance for Celta is Sansón, who was 15 years, 8 months and 11 days old when he made his debut in a 4–1 away win against Sevilla at Estadio de Nervión on New Year's Eve 1939.

This would prove to be a one off appearance, and Villanueva returned to the youth team for the next two seasons. He didn't play for the club again until the 1984–85 season, and not in the league until 1988. He made his La Liga debut on 21 May 1988 in an away fixture against Sevilla at Ramón Sánchez Pizjuán Stadium, with Celta running out 3–0 victors. However, his appearances would continue to be sporadic, and he went without a league appearance for the next three seasons, acting as backup to the ever-present Javier Maté. The 1991–92 Segunda División campaign was to be the one in which he finally established himself, seizing the first choice position from the again Maté.

He made his third league appearance for Celta, over a decade after his first, in the opening match of the season, a 3–0 home win over Lleida at Balaídos, and played every minute of the season as Los Celestes won the league and earned promotion back to La Liga. However, Celta signed promising young goalkeeper Santiago Cañizares from Real Madrid in the summer of 1992, and Villanueva was once again relegated to backup. He played just twice in the two seasons that Cañizares represented the club. Cañizares returned to Real in 1994, and Villanueva returned to the limelight, playing 27 games in the 1994–95 season. He made just one league appearance in each of the following two seasons, however, as first Toni Prats and then Richard Dutruel established themselves as first choice.

Villanueva's final appearance for Los Celestes came on 25 May 1997, as Dutruel conceded a penalty and was sent off just 22 minutes into a match with Real Valladolid at Estadio José Zorrilla. Villanueva came on, saved the penalty, and kept a clean sheet for the remainder of the game, helping Celta to a 1–0 victory thanks to Moisés's goal. These three points were crucial in helping the club escape relegation at the end of the season. This brought a glorious end to Villanueva's time at Celta, and he departed the club after making just 94 appearances in more than sixteen years.

Villanueva joined Levante ahead of the 1997–98 Segunda División season, and made his debut in their first match of the season, a 1–0 home loss to Toledo at Nou Estadi del Llevant on 30 August. He played 38 matches in all competitions, but could not prevent Levante being relegated. He spent the next two seasons Gondomar in the Tercera División, before joining Peña Sport for their 2000–01 Segunda División B campaign. He had to wait until 6 December to make his debut in a 2–0 home loss to Real Zaragoza B, but featured heavily for the rest of the campaign. He made 21 appearances, before retiring at the end of the season as he approached his 36th birthday.

== Coaching career ==
Villanueva returned to Celta Vigo in 2010, becoming their goalkeeping coach, a role he held until 2014.

== Honours ==
Celta Vigo

- Segunda División B: 1980–81
- Segunda División: 1991–92
- Copa del Rey runners-up: 1993–94

== Career statistics ==
As of 21 February 2021

Club	Season	League			Cup		Other		Total	
Club	Season	Division	Apps	Goals	Apps	Goals	Apps	Goals	Apps	Goals
Celta Vigo	1980–81	Segunda División B	1	0	0	0	–		1	0
Celta Vigo	1983–84	Segunda División	0	0	0	0	1	0	1	0
Celta Vigo	1984–85	Segunda División	0	0	3	0	0	0	3	0
Celta Vigo	1985–86	La Liga	0	0	0	0	0	0	0	0
Celta Vigo	1986–87	Segunda División	0	0	0	0	–		0	0
Celta Vigo	1987–88	La Liga	1	0	2	0	–		3	0
Celta Vigo	1988–89	La Liga	0	0	1	0	–		1	0
Celta Vigo	1989–90	La Liga	0	0	0	0	–		0	0
Celta Vigo	1990–91	Segunda División	0	0	1	0	–		1	0
Celta Vigo	1991–92	Segunda División	38	0	0	0	–		38	0
Celta Vigo	1992–93	La Liga	2	0	1	0	–		3	0
Celta Vigo	1993–94	La Liga	0	0	6	0	–		6	0
Celta Vigo	1994–95	La Liga	27	0	3	0	–		30	0
Celta Vigo	1995–96	La Liga	1	0	4	0	–		5	0
Celta Vigo	1996–97	La Liga	1	0	1	0	–		2	0
Celta Vigo	Total		71	0	22	0	1	0	94	0
Levante	1997–98	Segunda División	36	0	2	0	–		38	0
Peña Sport	2000–01	Segunda División B	21	0	0	0	–		21	0
Career total			128	0	24	0	1	0	153	0

1. Appearance in the 1984 Copa de la Liga Segunda División
