= José Manuel Tárraga =

Spanish footballer

Personal information
- Full name: José Manuel Tárraga Valero
- Date of birth: 15 April 1971 (age 55)
- Place of birth: Valencia, Spain
- Height: 1.84 m (6 ft 1/2 in)
- Position: Defender

Senior career*
Years	Team	Apps	(Gls)
1992–1994	Valencia Mestalla	50	(1)
1992–1994	Valencia	5	(0)
1994–1997	Celta Vigo	38	(0)
1997–1998	Lleida	29	(0)
1998–1999	Real Murcia	36	(1)
1999–2000	Yeclano	13	(1)
2000–2001	Cartagonova		
2001–2002	Pego		
Total		171	(3)
- * Club domestic league appearances and goals

José Manuel Tárraga Valero (born 15 April 1971) is a Spanish former footballer who played as a defender. He began his career with Valencia, and made a total of 43 La Liga appearances for that club and Celta Vigo during the 1990s.

== Career ==
Tárraga was born in Valencia, the capital of the autonomous community of the same name, and began his career with local club Valencia CF. He was on the bench for both legs of Valencia's 6–1 aggregate defeat by Napoli of Italy in the first round of the 1992–93 UEFA Cup, but didn't play in either. He spent the remainder of that season and the majority of the following one playing for the reserve side, Valencia Mestalla, in Segunda División B.

He made his La Liga debut for Valencia on 20 November 1993, in a 1–0 away win over Sevilla at Ramón Sánchez Pizjuán Stadium, and made a total of five appearances for the first team that season alongside his Mestalla commitments. However, seeking regular top flight football, he left Valencia at the end of the season to join Celta Vigo.

He made his debut for Celta in a 1–1 home draw with Athletic Bilbao at Balaídos on 10 September 1994, but was not first choice for the majority of the season, playing just 11 matches in all competitions. 1995–96 was his best season in the top division, as he made 26 appearances for Los Celestes, but he was out of favour again the following year, playing 11 times. He left the club in 1997 after three unspectacular seasons, with a total of 48 appearances.

Tárraga dropped down a division to join Lleida, making his debut on 30 August. This came at the same venue as his Valencia debut, away to Sevilla, but the result was very different, as Lleida lost 5–1. He was a regular starter that season, playing 32 matches in all competitions, but he dropped another tier in 1998–99, signing for Real Murcia.

His first match for Murcia was a 2–0 home win over Levante at Estadio de La Condomina on 30 August, and he played a total of 39 games in a successful season. Murcia ended up fourth in their group, qualifying for the promotion play-offs. However, three losses in their six play-off games left them third in their group, missing out on promotion to Getafe.

The following season, Tárraga joined Murcia's Segunda División B group rivals Yeclano. He was not initially a key part of the team, and had to wait until 6 February 2000 to make his debut, in a 0–0 home draw with his former club Murcia. He went on to make 13 appearances before the end of the season, scoring once in a 3–0 away victory over Premià on 2 April.

After leaving Yeclano in the summer of 2000, Tárraga saw out his career with one season each at Cartagonova and Pego. He retired in 2002 at the age of 31.

== Career statistics ==
As of 26 February 2021

Club	Season	League			Cup		Other		Total	
Club	Season	Division	Apps	Goals	Apps	Goals	Apps	Goals	Apps	Goals
Valencia	1991–92	La Liga	0	0	0	0	–		0	0
Valencia	1992–93	La Liga	0	0	1	0	0	0	1	0
Valencia	1993–94	La Liga	5	0	0	0	0	0	5	0
Valencia	Total		5	0	1	0	0	0	6	0
Valencia Mestalla	1992–93	Segunda División B	22	0	–		–		22	0
Valencia Mestalla	1993–94	Segunda División B	28	1	–		–		28	1
Valencia Mestalla	Total		50	1	0	0	0	0	50	1
Celta Vigo	1994–95	La Liga	9	0	2	0	–		11	0
Celta Vigo	1995–96	La Liga	22	0	4	0	–		26	0
Celta Vigo	1996–97	La Liga	7	0	4	0	–		11	0
Celta Vigo	Total		38	0	10	0	0	0	48	0
Lleida	1997–98	Segunda División	29	0	3	0	–		32	0
Real Murcia	1998–99	Segunda División B	36	1	–		3	0	39	1
Yeclano	1999–2000	Segunda División B	13	1	–		–		13	1
Career total			171	3	14	0	3	0	188	3

1. Appearances in the 1999 Segunda División B play-offs
