= Jorge Cadete =

Portuguese footballer (born 1968)

Personal information
- Full name: Jorge Paulo Cadete Santos Reis
- Date of birth: 27 August 1968 (age 58)
- Place of birth: Pemba, Mozambique
- Height: 1.75 m (5 ft 9 in)
- Position: Striker

Youth career
- 1983–1984: Académica Santarém
- 1984–1987: Sporting CP

Senior career*
Years	Team	Apps	(Gls)
1987–1995	Sporting CP	164	(62)
1988–1989	→ Vitória Setúbal (loan)	29	(8)
1994–1995	→ Brescia (loan)	13	(1)
1996–1997	Celtic	37	(30)
1997–1998	Celta	36	(8)
1999–2003	Benfica	19	(3)
2000	→ Bradford City (loan)	7	(0)
2000–2001	→ Estrela Amadora (loan)	28	(2)
2004	Partick Thistle	5	(0)
2004–2005	Pinhalnovense	4	(0)
2005–2007	São Marcos		
Total		342	(114)

International career
1989	Portugal U21	2	(0)
1990–1998	Portugal	33	(5)
- * Club domestic league appearances and goals

Jorge Paulo Cadete Santos Reis (born 27 August 1968), known as Cadete, is a Portuguese former professional footballer who played as a striker.

Born to Portuguese parents in Mozambique, he came up through Sporting CP's prolific youth system, and later was noted while at Celtic as he led the scoring charts in 1996–97.

Cadete amassed Primeira Liga totals of 233 matches and 73 goals over 12 seasons. A Portugal international throughout the 90s, he represented the nation at Euro 1996.

== Club career ==
=== Early career and Sporting CP ===
Born in Pemba (then called Porto Amélia), Portuguese Mozambique, Cadete began his footballing career with Associação Académica de Santarém at age 15, scoring an impressive 43 goals in just 18 games. His exploits alerted Primeira Liga giants Sporting CP and Benfica, with the former winning the race to sign the promising youngster.

Cadete broke into the senior team in 1987–88, starting in four of his six appearances and subsequently being sent on loan to fellow top-division club Vitória de Setúbal for the following season, helping his side to fifth place. He thus returned to Lisbon, where he remained the next five years, and in the 1992–93 campaign he was the national championship's top scorer with 18 goals.

Towards the end of his time at Sporting, Cadete was loaned out again in November 1994, this time to Italy's Brescia. He only managed one Serie A goal during his stint, returning subsequently to the Estádio José Alvalade and featuring in the first leg of the Supertaça Cândido de Oliveira against Porto in August 1995.

By early 1996, especially after the sacking of manager Bobby Robson and the arrival of Carlos Queiroz, Cadete was completely out of favour at Sporting and made no more appearances for them. He amassed competitive totals for the club of 203 games and 81 goals.

=== Celtic ===
On 24 February 1996, Cadete was introduced at Celtic Park, Glasgow to supporters before Celtic's league match against Partick Thistle. However, due to lengthy negotiations between Celtic and Sporting and issues with registering the player, his transfer was not finalised until April, and turned out to be controversial: despite being signed prior to the transfer deadline, the Scottish Football Association delayed processing his registration in time for the Scottish Cup semi-finals against Rangers at Hampden Park, and following a complaint from Celtic chairman Fergus McCann, SFA chief Jim Farry was eventually relieved of his duties after being found guilty of deliberately holding back the player's registration. His eventual debut came at home against Aberdeen as he came off the bench to score his team's fifth goal in a 5–0 win, thus becoming an instant hit; the loud roar generated by the fans celebrating his goal blew out BBC Radio 5's microphones, who had been covering the game UK wide on radio, and they went off air for a short time until it was repaired.

Cadete's only full season in Scotland was arguably the greatest of his career, with the player finishing the year as the country's top scorer with 38 goals in 49 appearances in all competitions, without the aid of penalty kicks. Despite this, his team lost the league championship to arch-rivals Rangers, and he played his last match against Dundee United, bowing to the fans before kissing the turf.

Along with Pierre van Hooijdonk and Paolo Di Canio, Cadete became embroiled in contractual disputes with the club, and was labelled as one of the "Three Amigos" by McCann. He remained a Celtic player over the summer, but fled back to Portugal citing mental health issues and a failure to adjust to life in Scotland without his family; his requests for a transfer were eventually granted.

=== To Spain and beyond ===
After failing to show for pre-season training, Cadete was transferred to Celta of La Liga for a fee of around £3,500,000. He spent one season with the Galicians, and scored on his debut on 27 September 1997 in a 3–3 draw away to Atlético Madrid. He moved to Benfica alongside former Celtic teammate van Hooijdonk in January 1999, and a year later he returned to the United Kingdom, joining newly promoted Premier League side Bradford City on loan until the end of the campaign; he made his debut as a substitute in a 1–1 draw with Aston Villa at Valley Parade, and was described as having an "instant impact" in that game.

For 2000–01, Cadete was loaned to the Lisbon-based Estrela da Amadora. As newly promoted Scots St Mirren looked for a striker to bolster their chances of top-flight survival, he almost made a return to the country, but the proposed January switch fell through and he remained in Estrela, subsequently seeing out his Benfica contract after claiming unpaid wages.

=== Retirement, return to football and Scotland ===
Following his release from Benfica, Cadete found himself unemployed. After failing to find a new team he announced his retirement, going on to make an appearance on the celebrity version of the Big Brother reality TV show.

At the start of 2003–04 season, aged 35, Cadete decided to return to football. He returned to Scotland to make a guest appearance on Tam Cowan's Scottish football show Offside, where he spoke of his love for Celtic and how he regretted leaving; he also invited manager Martin O'Neill to give him a trial at his former club.

Cadete's return to the public eye in Scotland prompted rookie co-managers Gerry Britton and Derek Whyte to take a gamble on the striker. He signed a short-term contract for top-tier relegation battlers Partick Thistle in late January 2004, ending his 18-month exile from the game; the move was controversial however, as he had already agreed to join Raith Rovers, even being photographed in the team shirt by the media.

Cadete made his debut for the Jags on 22 February against Celtic, and received a mixed reception, with jeers from some opposing fans as he came off the bench due to the manner of his departure six years earlier. Shortly after, he returned to old ways when he reported back for training 24 hours late, and was subsequently disciplined by the club; he did not manage to score for Thistle in four months, and was not offered an extension.

=== Later years ===
Cadete returned to his country in the 2004–05 campaign, agreeing to a deal at third division's Pinhalnovense. He cited the major factor in signing for the club was working with coach Paco Fortes.

The following two years, Cadete played amateur football in the Beja region, with FC São Marcos in São Marcos da Ataboeira, Castro Verde, being rejoined by some former professionals in the country, including Benfica and Farense's Hassan Nader. After retiring, he faced severe economic problems.

On 23 July 2015, Cadete was appointed director of football of União de Almeirim in Santarém.

== International career ==
Cadete won 33 caps for the Portugal national team scoring five goals, 22 while at Sporting, nine while at Celtic and two as a Celta player. His first game came on 29 August 1990, in a 1–1 friendly draw with Germany.

Cadete was chosen for the UEFA Euro 1996 finals by António Oliveira, after playing the decisive last match in the qualifying rounds against Republic of Ireland and netting the last in a 3–0 win as a substitute. His final appearance was a 3–0 defeat to England on 22 April 1998, in another exhibition game.

== Career statistics ==
=== Club ===
Appearances and goals by club, season and competition
Club	Season	League			National cup (Note: Includes Taça de Portugal, Scottish Cup, Copa del Rey)		League cup (Note: Includes Scottish League Cup)		Europe		Other		Total	
Club	Season	Division	Apps	Goals	Apps	Goals	Apps	Goals	Apps	Goals	Apps	Goals	Apps	Goals
Sporting CP	1987–88	Primeira Divisão	6	0	1	0	—		1	0	0	0	8	0
Sporting CP	1989–90	Primeira Divisão	29	7	1	0	—		0	0	—		33	4
Sporting CP	1990–91	Primeira Divisão	30	3	3	1	—		10 (Note: Appearance(s) in UEFA Cup)	6	—		43	10
Sporting CP	1991–92	Primeira Divisão	34	25	2	1	—		2	0	—		38	26
Sporting CP	1992–93	Primeira Divisão	34	18	5	4	—		2	1	—		41	22
Sporting CP	1993–94	Primeira Divisão	26	10	4	1	—		6	4	—		36	15
Sporting CP	1994–95	Primeira Divisão	2	0	0	0	—		1	0	—		3	0
Sporting CP	1995–96	Primeira Divisão	3	0	0	0	—		0	0	1 (Note: Appearance in Supertaça Cândido de Oliveira)	0	4	0
Sporting CP	Total		164	62	16	7	0	0	22	11	1	0	203	80
Vitória Setúbal (loan)	1988–89	Primeira Divisão	29	8	1	0	—		—		—		30	8
Brescia (loan)	1994–95	Serie A	13	1	—		—		—		—		13	1
Celtic	1995–96	Scottish Premier Division	6	5	—		—		—		—		6	5
Celtic	1996–97	Scottish Premier Division	31	25	5	2	3	5	4 (Note: Appearances in UEFA Champions League)	1	—		43	33
Celtic	Total		37	30	5	2	3	5	4	1	0	0	49	38
Celta	1997–98	La Liga	29	7	1	0	—		—		—		30	7
Celta	1998–99	La Liga	7	1			—		4	0	—		11	1
Celta	Total		36	8	1	0	0	0	4	0	0	0	41	8
Benfica	1998–99	Primeira Divisão	16	3	1	0	—		—		—		17	3
Benfica	1999–2000	Primeira Liga	3	0	1	0	—		1	0	—		5	0
Benfica	2002–03	Primeira Liga	0	0	0	0	—		—		—		0	0
Benfica	Total		19	3	2	0	0	0	1	0	0	0	22	3
Bradford City (loan)	1999–2000	Premier League	7	0	—		—		—		—		7	0
Estrela Amadora (loan)	2000–01	Primeira Liga	21	0	1	0	—		—		—		22	0
Estrela Amadora (loan)	2001–02	Segunda Liga	7	2	0	0	—		—		—		7	2
Estrela Amadora (loan)	Total		28	2	1	0	0	0	0	0	0	0	29	2
Partick Thistle	2003–04	Scottish Premier League	5	0					—		—		5	0
Pinhalnovense	2004–05	Segunda Divisão B	4	0	1	2	—		—		—		5	2
São Marcos	2005–06						—		—		—			
São Marcos	2006–07						—		—		—			
São Marcos	Total						0	0	0	0	0	0		
Career total			342	114	26	11	3	5	31	12	1	0	403	142

=== International ===
Jorge Cadete: International goals
No.	Date	Venue	Opponent	Score	Result	Competition
1	20 February 1991	Estádio das Antas, Porto, Portugal	Malta	5–0	5–0	Euro 1992 qualifying
2	28 April 1993	Estádio da Luz (1954), Lisbon, Portugal	Scotland	2–0	5–0	1994 World Cup qualification
3	28 April 1993	Estádio da Luz (1954), Lisbon, Portugal	Scotland	5–0	5–0	1994 World Cup qualification
4	19 June 1993	Estádio do Bessa, Porto, Portugal	Malta	4–0	4–0	1994 World Cup qualification
5	15 November 1995	Estádio da Luz (1954), Lisbon, Portugal	Republic of Ireland	3–0	3–0	Euro 1996 qualifying

== Honours ==
Sporting CP

- Supertaça Cândido de Oliveira: 1995

Individual

- Bola de Prata: 1992–93
- Scottish Premier League top scorer: 1996–97
- Taça de Portugal top scorer: 1992–93
