= Juan Manuel Prieto =

Spanish footballer (born 1971)

Personal information
- Full name: Juan Manuel Prieto Velasco
- Date of birth: 30 June 1971 (age 55)
- Place of birth: Madrid, Spain
- Height: 1.87 m (6 ft 2 in)
- Position: Forward

Senior career*
Years	Team	Apps	(Gls)
1989–1991	Parla		
1991–1992	Leganés	36	(9)
1992–1996	Mérida	66	(25)
1992–1993	→ Cacereño (loan)	37	(22)
1994	→ Levante (loan)	10	(2)
1996–1998	Celta Vigo	12	(1)
1997–1998	→ Rayo Vallecano (loan)	29	(11)
1998	→ Real Madrid B (loan)	0	(0)
1998–1999	Compostela	25	(8)
1999–2000	Mérida	34	(11)
2000–2001	Universidad Las Palmas	20	(2)
2001–2002	Elche	0	(0)
Total		269+	(91+)
- * Club domestic league appearances and goals

Juan Manuel Prieto Velasco (born 30 June 1971) is a Spanish former footballer who played as a forward.

In a journeyman career, he played 51 La Liga games and scored 16 goals for Mérida and Celta Vigo but spent most of his career in the Segunda División, achieving totals of 135 games and 42 goals for five clubs including two spells at Mérida.

== Career ==
Born in Madrid and raised in nearby Leganés, Prieto played in the youth ranks of local Patronato de Leganés up to the age of 15 before trialling at Atlético Madrid and Parla. He played two seasons in the Tercera División with the latter, finishing as top scorer in the second.

Prieto then played at CD Leganés in the Segunda División B before signing for Mérida, where he was also loaned to Cacereño and Levante. In 1994–95, he was the team's top scorer with 10 goals in 26 games as they won the Segunda División and became the first Extremaduran club in the history of La Liga; this included a hat-trick on 2 April in a 4–0 home win over Hércules. He was not favoured by manager Sergije Krešić in the first half of the season and wished to return to Leganés, but broke into the team after scoring two goals against Atlético Marbella on 12 December.

In 1995–96, Prieto made the top 10 of goalscorers with 15 strikes though his team were relegated. This included braces in 2–0 wins over Tenerife and Celta Vigo at the Estadio Romano, with the former ending a three-month stint without a home win.

Prieto remained in the top flight, signing a five-year deal at Celta. His only league goal for the Galician club came as a 2–1 winner away to Real Sociedad on 23 October 1996 after replacing Milorad Ratković at half time; he added two more in the Copa del Rey against Logroñés and Lleida.

After loans to Rayo Vallecano and Real Madrid Castilla, Prieto left Celta in August 1998 when he was exchanged with 300 million Spanish pesetas (€325,000) for Lyuboslav Penev of neighbours Compostela. A year later, he was back at Mérida, still in the second tier, intending to retire at the club. The Romanos finished the 1999–2000 Segunda División season three points off promotion to La Liga, but were dissolved for financial reasons.

In September 2000, Prieto signed for newly promoted second division club Universidad de Las Palmas. He conceded in 2024 that he had chosen the Canary Islands-based club solely for money, and said that what he perceived to be the "amateur" quality of the club made him lose interest in football.

Prieto signed for Elche in 2001. Persistent knee injuries meant that he took no part in his final season as a player.

== Personal life ==
From 2004 to 2009, Prieto was the majority shareholder and manager of a chain of clothing shops. When his business crashed during the Spanish financial crisis, he became a taxi driver. Extremaduran newspaper Hoy described him in 2015 as self-employed in the transport sector in Madrid since November 2009.

The mayor of Mérida, Pedro Acedo Penco, included Prieto on his People's Party list for the 2015 Spanish local elections. Third on the list, he was elected but declined to take office due to work commitments.

As of 2015, Prieto was married and had two children.
