= Ito (footballer, born 1975) =

Spanish footballer and manager

Personal information
- Full name: Antonio Álvarez Pérez
- Date of birth: 21 January 1975 (age 51)
- Place of birth: Almendralejo, Spain
- Height: 1.76 m (5 ft 9 1/2 in)
- Position: Defensive midfielder

Youth career
- Extremadura

Senior career*
| Years | Team | Apps | (Gls) |
| 1991–1997 | Extremadura | 145 | (9) |
| 1997–1998 | Celta | 34 | (1) |
| 1998–2004 | Betis | 160 | (5) |
| 2004–2007 | Espanyol | 66 | (0) |
| 2007–2009 | Córdoba | 65 | (2) |
| 2009–2010 | Cacereño | 22 | (2) |
| Total | | 492 | (19) |

International career
| 1993 | Spain U18 | 10 | (0) |
| 1997–1998 | Spain U21 | 6 | (0) |
| 1998 | Spain | 1 | (0) |

Managerial career
- 2011–2012: Villafranca
- 2013–2015: Díter Zafra
- 2017–2018: Azuaga
- * Club domestic league appearances and goals

Antonio Álvarez Pérez (born 21 January 1975), known as Ito, is a Spanish former professional footballer who played as a defensive midfielder.

He amassed La Liga totals of 282 matches and seven goals over ten seasons, mainly with Betis (five years) and Espanyol (three).

Ito appeared once for the Spain national team. After retiring, he worked as a manager.

== Club career ==
Born in Almendralejo, Extremadura, Ito started playing professionally with local CF Extremadura, helping it rise from the Segunda División B to La Liga and making his top-flight debut on 9 September 1996 in a game against Real Betis. Even though the club was finally relegated, he was a key midfield element (39 matches, one goal) and attracted interest from RC Celta de Vigo, which he helped qualify for the UEFA Cup in his sole season.

Subsequently, Ito spent six years with Betis, being relegated in his second season but being always an important first-team member, on occasion wearing the captain's armband. Released in 2004, he joined Barcelona's RCD Espanyol.

With Espanyol, Ito won the 2006 edition of the Copa del Rey and, although a reserve in the Catalan team's 2006–07 league campaign – eight appearances – he played ten UEFA Cup games as they lost the final on penalties to Sevilla FC.

In July 2007, Ito signed with Segunda División side Córdoba CF, being released at the age of 34 after two seasons, following which he dropped down a tier and joined CP Cacereño in his native region. After retiring, he acted as manager in the Tercera División with SP Villafranca, CD Díter Zafra and CD Azuaga.

== International career ==
After a fine individual campaign with Celta which led to a transfer to Betis, Ito earned his sole cap for Spain on 23 September 1998, featuring the last two minutes of a 1–0 friendly win over Russia in Granada.

Previously, he helped the under-21s to win the 1998 UEFA European Championships, playing the final against Greece.

== Honours ==
Espanyol

- Copa del Rey: 2005–06
- UEFA Cup runner-up: 2006–07

Spain U21

- UEFA European Under-21 Championship: 1998
