= Ángel Merino =

Spanish footballer and manager (born 1966)

Personal information
- Full name: Ángel Miguel Merino Torres
- Date of birth: 2 October 1966 (age 60)
- Place of birth: Madrid, Spain
- Height: 1.82 m (6 ft 0 in)
- Position: Midfielder

Youth career
- AV La Chimenea
- 1983–1985: Moscardó
- 1985–1986: Leganés

Senior career*
| Years | Team | Apps | (Gls) |
| 1986–1988 | Leganés | 24 | (5) |
| 1988–1994 | Osasuna | 190 | (17) |
| 1994–1997 | Celta | 103 | (9) |
| 1997–1999 | Las Palmas | 47 | (4) |
| 1999–2001 | Leganés | 72 | (8) |
| 2001–2002 | Burgos | 40 | (4) |
| 2002–2003 | Ceuta | 21 | (2) |
| Total | | 497 | (49) |

Managerial career
- 2004–2008: Osasuna (youth)
- 2008–2013: Osasuna B
- 2013–2014: Peña Sport
- * Club domestic league appearances and goals

Ángel Miguel Merino Torres (born 2 October 1966) is a Spanish former professional footballer who played as a central midfielder. He was also a manager.

He amassed La Liga totals of 293 games and 26 goals over nine seasons, with Osasuna and Celta. He added 158 matches and 16 goals in the Segunda División, in representation of three clubs.

Merino started working as a manager in 2004, spending several years at Osasuna in various capacities.

== Playing career ==
Born in Madrid, Merino started playing football with local club CD Leganés, with whom he appeared in two Segunda División B seasons. In 1988, he moved straight into La Liga after signing with CA Osasuna, making his debut in the competition on 4 September in an away match against Real Madrid and scoring the last goal in a 2–2 draw.

In 1992–93, Merino scored a career-best six goals (in 35 matches), helping the Navarrese to finish in tenth position. After the team's relegation the following campaign, he joined RC Celta de Vigo also in the top flight, being first choice during his three-year tenure.

From 1997 to 2002, Merino competed in the Segunda División, netting a total of 16 goals for UD Las Palmas, Leganés and Burgos CF and suffering administrative relegation with the latter team. He retired at the age of 36, after one season in the third tier with AD Ceuta.

== Coaching career ==
One year after retiring, Merino returned to Osasuna and started working with its youth sides. In March 2008 he was appointed at the reserves who competed in division three, his first game in charge being a 1–0 away win over CF Palencia late into the month.

After being relegated from the third tier in 2013, Merino cut ties with the club and joined neighbouring Peña Sport FC in the same capacity. After meeting the same fate, he was relieved of his duties.

== Personal life ==
Merino's elder brother Julián was also a footballer, playing as a defender for Leganés in the third and fourth levels (they were teammates between the 1985–86 and 1987–88 seasons).

His son, Mikel, is a footballer and a midfielder. At UEFA Euro 2024, he scored a late winning goal for Spain in Stuttgart, with his celebration of running around the corner flag mirroring that of his father after he had done so for Osasuna in a UEFA Cup fixture at the same stadium in 1991.

== See also ==
- List of Spanish association football families
