= 1995–96 La Liga =

65th season of La Liga

La Liga
- Season: 1995–96
- Dates: 2 September 1995 – 26 May 1996
- Champions: Atlético Madrid; 9th title
- Relegated: Albacete; Mérida; Salamanca
- Champions League: Atlético Madrid
- UEFA Cup: Valencia; Espanyol; Tenerife
- Cup Winners' Cup: Barcelona
- Matches: 462
- Goals: 1,246 (2.7 per match)
- Top goalscorer: Juan Antonio Pizzi (31 goals)

The 1995–96 La Liga season was the 65th since its establishment. It began on 2 September 1995, and concluded on 26 May 1996.

== Team information ==
=== Personnel and kits ===
(End of season)

| Team | Chairman | Manager |
|---|---|---|
| Albacete | (Spain) José Ramón Remiro Brotóns | (Spain) Iñaki Sáez |
| Athletic Bilbao | (Spain) José María Arrate | (Spain) José María Amorrortu (c) |
| Atlético Madrid | (Spain) Jesús Gil | (Federal Republic of Yugoslavia) Radomir Antić |
| Barcelona | (Spain) Josep Lluís Núñez | (Spain) Carles Rexach |
| Betis | (Spain) | (Spain) Lorenzo Serra Ferrer |
| Celta Vigo | (Spain) Horacio Gómez Araujo | (Spain) Fernando Castro Santos |
| Compostela | (Spain) José María Caneda | (Spain) Fernando Vázquez |
| Deportivo La Coruña | (Spain) Augusto César Lendoiro | (Wales) John Toshack |
| Espanyol | (Spain) Francisco Perelló | (Spain) José Antonio Camacho |
| Mérida | (Spain) | (Croatia) Sergije Krešić |
| Oviedo | (Spain) | (Federal Republic of Yugoslavia) Ivan Brzić |
| Racing Santander | (Spain) | (Spain) Nando Yosu |
| Rayo Vallecano | (Spain) | (Spain) Fernando Zambrano |
| Real Madrid | (Spain) Lorenzo Sanz | (Spain) Arsenio Iglesias |
| Real Sociedad | (Spain) | (Spain) Javier Irureta |
| Sporting Gijón | (Spain) José Fernández | (Spain) Novoa |
| Salamanca | (Spain) | (Argentina) Jorge D'Alessandro |
| Sevilla | (Spain) | (Uruguay) Víctor Espárrago |
| Tenerife | (Spain) Javier Perez Perez | (Germany) Jupp Heynckes |
| Valencia | (Spain) | (Spain) Luis Aragonés |
| Valladolid | (Spain) | (Argentina) Vicente Cantatore |
| Zaragoza | (Spain) Alfonso Soláns | (Spain) Víctor Fernández |

=== Clubs and locations ===
Location of teams in La Liga 1995–96
Canary Islands

| Team | Stadium | Capacity |
|---|---|---|
| Barcelona | Camp Nou | 98,772 |
| Real Madrid | Santiago Bernabéu | 80,354 |
| Atlético Madrid | Vicente Calderón | 55,005 |
| Valencia | Mestalla | 55,000 |
| Real Betis | Benito Villamarín | 47,500 |
| Sevilla | Ramón Sánchez Pizjuán | 42,714 |
| Espanyol | Sarrià | 44,000 |
| Athletic Bilbao | San Mamés | 39,750 |
| Deportivo de La Coruña | Riazor | 34,600 |
| Real Zaragoza | La Romareda | 34,596 |
| Celta de Vigo | Balaídos | 32,500 |
| Real Sociedad | Anoeta | 32,200 |
| Valladolid | José Zorrilla | 27,846 |
| Sporting de Gijón | El Molinón | 25,885 |
| Real Oviedo | Carlos Tartiere | 23,500 |
| Tenerife | Heliodoro Rodríguez López | 22,824 |
| Racing de Santander | El Sardinero | 22,222 |
| Albacete | Carlos Belmonte | 18,000 |
| Salamanca | Helmántico | 17,341 |
| Rayo Vallecano | Vallecas | 14,708 |
| Mérida | Estadio Romano | 14,600 |
| Compostela | San Lázaro | 12,000 |

=== Notes ===
- With Mérida's promotion every Spanish autonomous community (though not every province) has been represented in Primera División.
- Initially, only 20 teams would play this season in Primera División, but Sevilla FC and Celta de Vigo were relegated to Segunda División B for not making their payments to the Royal Spanish Football Federation. Then, Albacete and Real Valladolid, initially relegated, were readmitted in Primera División. Later, Sevilla FC and Celta de Vigo were also readmitted and the league was expanded to 22 teams for two seasons.
- From this season on, wins were awarded 3 points instead of 2 (similar to other domestic leagues that had 3-1-0 team scoring point format).

== League table ==
| Pos | Team | Pld | W | D | L | GF | GA | GD | Pts | Qualification or relegation |
|---|---|---|---|---|---|---|---|---|---|---|
| 1 | Atlético Madrid (C) | 42 | 26 | 9 | 7 | 75 | 32 | +43 | 87 | Qualification for the Champions League group stage |
| 2 | Valencia | 42 | 26 | 5 | 11 | 77 | 51 | +26 | 83 | Qualification for the UEFA Cup first round |
| 3 | Barcelona | 42 | 22 | 14 | 6 | 72 | 39 | +33 | 80 | Qualification for the Cup Winners' Cup first round (Note: Since Atlético Madrid, winners of 1995–96 Copa del Rey, was qualified for the 1996–97 UEFA Champions League, losing cup finalists Barcelona earned a spot in the first round of the 1996–97 UEFA Cup Winners' Cup.) |
| 4 | Espanyol | 42 | 20 | 14 | 8 | 63 | 36 | +27 | 74 | Qualification for the UEFA Cup first round |
| 5 | Tenerife | 42 | 20 | 12 | 10 | 69 | 54 | +15 | 72 | Qualification for the UEFA Cup first round |
| 6 | Real Madrid | 42 | 20 | 10 | 12 | 75 | 51 | +24 | 70 | |
| 7 | Real Sociedad | 42 | 17 | 12 | 13 | 62 | 53 | +9 | 63 | |
| 8 | Real Betis | 42 | 16 | 14 | 12 | 61 | 54 | +7 | 62 | |
| 9 | Deportivo La Coruña | 42 | 16 | 13 | 13 | 63 | 44 | +19 | 61 | |
| 10 | Compostela | 42 | 17 | 8 | 17 | 47 | 54 | −7 | 59 | |
| 11 | Celta Vigo | 42 | 12 | 16 | 14 | 49 | 51 | −2 | 52 | |
| 12 | Sevilla | 42 | 11 | 15 | 16 | 43 | 55 | −12 | 48 (Note: SEV: 10 pts;ZAR: 8 pts; ROV: 6 pts → ROV 0–0 ATH; ATH: 6 pts → ATH 0–1 ROV) | |
| 13 | Zaragoza | 42 | 11 | 15 | 16 | 51 | 59 | −8 | 48 | |
| 14 | Oviedo | 42 | 12 | 12 | 18 | 48 | 67 | −19 | 48 | |
| 15 | Athletic Bilbao | 42 | 11 | 15 | 16 | 44 | 55 | −11 | 48 | |
| 16 | Valladolid | 42 | 11 | 14 | 17 | 57 | 62 | −5 | 47 (Note: RAC 0–0 VLD; VLD 3–1 RAC) | |
| 17 | Racing Santander | 42 | 11 | 14 | 17 | 47 | 69 | −22 | 47 | |
| 18 | Sporting Gijón | 42 | 13 | 7 | 22 | 51 | 60 | −9 | 46 | |
| 19 | Rayo Vallecano (O) | 42 | 12 | 8 | 22 | 47 | 75 | −28 | 44 | Qualification for the relegation playoffs |
| 20 | Albacete (R) | 42 | 10 | 12 | 20 | 55 | 81 | −26 | 42 (Note: MÉR 1–1 ALB; ALB 2–0 MÉR) | Qualification for the relegation playoffs |
| 21 | Mérida (R) | 42 | 10 | 12 | 20 | 37 | 62 | −25 | 42 | Relegation to the Segunda División |
| 22 | Salamanca (R) | 42 | 8 | 9 | 25 | 53 | 82 | −29 | 33 | Relegation to the Segunda División |

Source: LFP
Rules for classification: 1) points; 2) head-to-head points; 3) head-to-head goal difference; 4) head-to-head goals scored; 5) goal difference; 6) number of goals scored.
(C) Champions; (O) Play-off winners; (R) Relegated

== Results ==
| Home \ Away | ALB | ATH | ATM | BAR | BET | CEL | COM | DEP | ESP | MÉR | RAC | RAY | RMA | ROV | RSO | SAL | SEV | SPG | TEN | VAL | VLD | ZAR |
|---|---|---|---|---|---|---|---|---|---|---|---|---|---|---|---|---|---|---|---|---|---|---|
| Albacete Balompié | | 2–0 | 1–1 | 0–1 | 0–0 | 4–0 | 2–1 | 1–0 | 0–0 | 2–0 | 2–2 | 1–2 | 1–1 | 0–1 | 3–5 | 3–3 | 3–2 | 1–3 | 0–0 | 1–3 | 4–2 | 0–1 |
| Athletic Bilbao | 2–2 | | 0–2 | 0–0 | 0–1 | 3–0 | 0–0 | 1–0 | 0–0 | 1–1 | 4–0 | 3–1 | 0–5 | 0–1 | 0–0 | 3–1 | 1–1 | 2–1 | 2–0 | 0–1 | 2–1 | 1–0 |
| Atlético Madrid | 2–0 | 4–1 | | 3–1 | 1–1 | 3–2 | 3–0 | 1–0 | 2–1 | 1–1 | 2–0 | 0–0 | 1–2 | 3–0 | 4–1 | 2–1 | 0–1 | 2–0 | 3–1 | 2–3 | 0–2 | 1–1 |
| FC Barcelona | 3–0 | 4–1 | 1–3 | | 1–0 | 3–2 | 1–0 | 1–1 | 2–1 | 2–2 | 1–1 | 2–0 | 3–0 | 4–1 | 1–0 | 4–1 | 1–1 | 1–0 | 2–2 | 1–0 | 1–0 | 3–1 |
| Betis | 2–3 | 0–0 | 2–1 | 1–5 | | 0–3 | 5–0 | 1–0 | 2–3 | 0–1 | 2–2 | 0–0 | 0–0 | 2–1 | 3–1 | 4–0 | 1–1 | 2–5 | 3–3 | 3–0 | 3–0 | 3–1 |
| Celta de Vigo | 2–2 | 3–1 | 0–3 | 1–0 | 2–0 | | 0–1 | 0–0 | 4–2 | 2–0 | 0–0 | 2–0 | 1–1 | 1–0 | 1–1 | 2–1 | 4–0 | 0–0 | 2–2 | 1–1 | 1–1 | 1–1 |
| SD Compostela | 3–1 | 2–1 | 1–3 | 2–1 | 1–2 | 1–1 | | 4–0 | 2–1 | 1–0 | 2–0 | 1–0 | 3–3 | 4–1 | 2–0 | 0–0 | 0–0 | 1–0 | 0–2 | 0–4 | 1–3 | 3–2 |
| Deportivo de La Coruña | 5–0 | 0–0 | 2–2 | 2–2 | 0–0 | 2–1 | 2–0 | | 0–1 | 2–1 | 2–3 | 1–0 | 3–0 | 0–4 | 1–1 | 2–0 | 3–2 | 1–0 | 1–1 | 3–0 | 3–1 | 2–3 |
| RCD Espanyol | 1–0 | 3–0 | 0–2 | 1–1 | 1–1 | 2–2 | 0–0 | 0–0 | | 3–0 | 1–0 | 4–2 | 3–1 | 5–0 | 0–0 | 3–1 | 0–1 | 0–0 | 2–1 | 2–0 | 2–0 | 1–1 |
| CP Mérida | 1–1 | 1–0 | 0–1 | 0–0 | 1–1 | 2–0 | 0–2 | 0–2 | 0–1 | | 3–1 | 0–1 | 2–2 | 3–1 | 1–2 | 0–0 | 3–2 | 1–0 | 2–0 | 0–2 | 1–0 | 1–1 |
| Racing de Santander | 5–5 | 1–1 | 0–4 | 1–1 | 0–0 | 2–1 | 1–0 | 2–1 | 1–1 | 2–0 | | 1–2 | 2–0 | 0–0 | 2–3 | 2–1 | 1–1 | 1–1 | 1–2 | 0–3 | 0–0 | 0–0 |
| Rayo Vallecano | 2–0 | 2–2 | 0–3 | 1–1 | 1–2 | 1–3 | 0–1 | 0–6 | 1–0 | 4–1 | 1–2 | | 1–5 | 1–2 | 2–0 | 1–4 | 0–0 | 2–0 | 2–4 | 3–2 | 0–2 | 4–3 |
| Real Madrid | 2–0 | 1–2 | 1–0 | 1–1 | 4–2 | 1–0 | 2–1 | 1–0 | 1–2 | 4–0 | 1–2 | 1–2 | | 2–3 | 3–2 | 5–0 | 4–1 | 0–1 | 2–0 | 0–0 | 4–1 | 2–2 |
| Real Oviedo | 1–0 | 0–0 | 1–1 | 1–2 | 0–1 | 1–1 | 3–1 | 0–2 | 1–2 | 0–0 | 2–1 | 2–0 | 1–2 | | 0–0 | 2–2 | 2–3 | 1–0 | 1–3 | 0–1 | 3–8 | 1–1 |
| Real Sociedad | 8–1 | 2–2 | 1–0 | 1–1 | 1–1 | 3–1 | 0–1 | 2–1 | 0–1 | 1–2 | 2–1 | 2–1 | 1–1 | 1–1 | | 1–0 | 1–0 | 2–0 | 0–1 | 5–2 | 1–0 | 3–1 |
| UD Salamanca | 2–4 | 2–1 | 1–3 | 1–3 | 2–1 | 0–1 | 1–0 | 0–5 | 2–2 | 2–2 | 5–0 | 1–2 | 0–2 | 0–1 | 3–3 | | 4–1 | 3–0 | 1–2 | 4–0 | 0–0 | 0–1 |
| Sevilla FC | 1–1 | 1–1 | 0–0 | 1–0 | 1–0 | 0–0 | 0–1 | 0–0 | 0–3 | 3–0 | 0–1 | 1–0 | 0–1 | 1–1 | 2–1 | 3–1 | | 2–0 | 0–1 | 1–2 | 1–1 | 1–1 |
| Sporting de Gijón | 3–0 | 1–2 | 1–2 | 0–3 | 2–3 | 1–0 | 2–1 | 1–1 | 2–3 | 3–1 | 4–2 | 3–1 | 0–0 | 0–1 | 1–1 | 3–2 | 3–1 | | 0–2 | 1–3 | 4–2 | 4–1 |
| Tenerife | 1–3 | 3–2 | 1–1 | 1–1 | 1–2 | 1–0 | 1–1 | 1–1 | 1–4 | 1–0 | 2–0 | 2–2 | 3–0 | 3–3 | 1–0 | 4–0 | 4–2 | 3–0 | | 2–1 | 1–0 | 1–2 |
| Valencia CF | 1–0 | 3–1 | 0–1 | 4–1 | 1–1 | 3–0 | 5–2 | 2–1 | 1–0 | 4–1 | 2–1 | 3–0 | 4–3 | 3–1 | 0–1 | 2–0 | 1–0 | 1–0 | 2–2 | | 1–0 | 0–0 |
| Valladolid | 3–0 | 1–1 | 0–1 | 0–2 | 3–1 | 1–1 | 0–0 | 2–2 | 0–0 | 1–1 | 3–1 | 1–1 | 0–3 | 2–2 | 3–0 | 1–0 | 3–3 | 1–0 | 3–0 | 2–5 | | 0–0 |
| Zaragoza | 3–1 | 1–0 | 0–1 | 0–3 | 1–2 | 0–0 | 1–0 | 2–3 | 1–1 | 3–1 | 1–2 | 1–1 | 0–1 | 1–0 | 1–2 | 1–1 | 0–1 | 1–1 | 0–2 | 4–1 | 5–3 | |

Updated to match(es) played on unknown. Source:
Legend: Blue = home team win; Yellow = draw; Red = away team win.

== Relegation playoff ==
| Team 1 | Agg. | Team 2 | 1st leg | 2nd leg |
|---|---|---|---|---|
| RCD Mallorca | 1–2 | Rayo Vallecano | 1–0 | 0–2 |
| CF Extremadura | 2–0 | Albacete Balompié | 1–0 | 1–0 |

=== First leg ===
| 29 May 1996 | RCD Mallorca | 1–0 | Rayo Vallecano | Palma de Mallorca |
| 21:30 | Morales 30' | Report (in Spanish) | | Stadium: Lluís Sitjar; Attendance: 17,000; Referee: Celino Gracia Redondo (Aragon) |

| 30 May 1996 | CF Extremadura | 1–0 | Albacete Balompié | Almendralejo |
| 21:30 | Manuel 54' | Report (in Spanish) | | Stadium: Francisco de la Hera; Attendance: 11,000; Referee: José María García-Aranda (Community of Madrid) |

=== Second leg ===
| 1 June 1996 | Rayo Vallecano | 2–0 (2–1 agg.) | RCD Mallorca | Madrid |
| 20:30 | Guilherme 13'; Onésimo 81' | Report (in Spanish) | | Stadium: Vallecas; Attendance: 14,000; Referee: Antonio Jesús López Nieto (Andalusia) |

| 2 June 1996 | Albacete Balompié | 0–1 (0–2 agg.) | CF Extremadura | Albacete |
| 21:30 | | Report (in Spanish) | Tirado 90' | Stadium: Carlos Belmonte; Attendance: 17,000; Referee: Víctor Esquinas Torres (Andalusia) |

== Top goalscorers ==
| Rank | Player | Club | Goals |
|---|---|---|---|
| 1 | (Argentina) Juan Antonio Pizzi | Tenerife | 31 |
| 2 | (Federal Republic of Yugoslavia) Predrag Mijatović | Valencia | 28 |
| 3 | (Brazil) Bebeto | Deportivo La Coruña | 25 |
| 4 | (Croatia) Alen Peternac | Valladolid | 23 |
| 5 | (Spain) Raúl | Real Madrid | 20 |
| 6 | (Spain) Julio Salinas | Sporting Gijón | 18 |
| 7 | (Spain) Jordi Lardín | Espanyol | 17 |
| 8 | (Bulgaria) Lyuboslav Penev | Atlético Madrid | 16 |
| 8 | (Croatia) Davor Šuker | Sevilla | 16 |
| 10 | (Bosnia and Herzegovina) Vladimir Gudelj | Celta Vigo | 15 |
| 10 | (Spain) Juan Manuel Prieto | Mérida | 15 |

== Attendances ==
| # | Club | Avg. attendance | Highest |
|---|---|---|---|
| 1 | FC Barcelona | 81,190 | 115,000 |
| 2 | Real Madrid | 67,714 | 100,000 |
| 3 | Valencia CF | 47,286 | 50,000 |
| 4 | Atlético de Madrid | 45,476 | 60,000 |
| 5 | Sevilla FC | 40,224 | 62,000 |
| 6 | Real Betis | 39,333 | 46,000 |
| 7 | Athletic Club | 35,714 | 43,000 |
| 8 | RCD Espanyol | 27,721 | 38,000 |
| 9 | Deportivo de La Coruña | 25,643 | 30,000 |
| 10 | Real Zaragoza | 24,571 | 35,000 |
| 11 | Real Sporting de Gijón | 21,838 | 32,000 |
| 12 | Real Sociedad | 21,465 | 30,000 |
| 13 | Celta de Vigo | 20,857 | 30,000 |
| 14 | Real Valladolid | 18,667 | 30,000 |
| 15 | UD Salamanca | 16,733 | 28,000 |
| 16 | CD Tenerife | 16,405 | 25,000 |
| 17 | Real Racing Club | 16,300 | 22,000 |
| 18 | Real Oviedo | 16,289 | 24,500 |
| 19 | Albacete Balompié | 13,252 | 16,000 |
| 20 | Mérida UD | 13,048 | 18,000 |
| 21 | Rayo Vallecano | 10,310 | 20,000 |
| 22 | SD Compostela | 10,048 | 15,000 |
