= Carlos Pérez (footballer, born 1971) =

Spanish footballer (1971–2006)

Personal information
- Full name: Carlos Pérez Álvarez
- Date of birth: 1 November 1971
- Place of birth: Vigo, Spain
- Date of death: 5 July 2006 (aged 34)
- Place of death: Nigrán, Spain
- Height: 1.77 m (5 ft 10 in)
- Position: Central midfielder

Youth career
- 1987–1989: Celta

Senior career*
Years	Team	Apps	(Gls)
1989–1993	Celta B		
1992–1998	Celta	47	(3)
1996–1997	→ Almería (loan)	21	(2)
1998–1999	Chaves	27	(4)
1999–2001	Vitória Guimarães	39	(0)
2001–2004	Nacional	71	(7)
2004–2005	Ourense	26	(0)
Total		231	(16)

International career
1993	Spain U21	1	(0)
- * Club domestic league appearances and goals

Carlos Pérez Álvarez (1 November 1971 – 5 July 2006) was a Spanish professional footballer who played as a central midfielder.

The most important part of his career was spent in Portugal, although the majority of his career was spent playing in his hometown Celta.

== Club career ==
Born in Vigo, Province of Pontevedra, Pérez started his professional career in the hometown club RC Celta de Vigo. His stay, however, would not be a productive one, as he only totalled 16 first-team appearances over his first three seasons.

From 1994 to 1996, Pérez appeared slightly more, but never established himself as an important member of the main squad, being subsequently loaned to UD Almería from Segunda División; he played the most he had in years there, but suffered relegation. Upon his return to Celta, he made no La Liga appearances whatsoever and was released.

Pérez then took his game to Iberian Peninsula neighbours Portugal, first with G.D. Chaves. After one Primeira Liga campaign where he scored a career-best four goals (albeit with relegation), he joined another club in the north, Vitória de Guimarães.

In the summer of 2001, Pérez signed with second level team C.D. Nacional, helping them promote in his debut campaign (19 matches, two goals). He continued to feature regularly in the following two seasons, after which he returned home, joining CD Ourense, also in his native region.

== Death ==
Settling in Pontevedra, Nigrán, after his retirement, Pérez died on 5 July 2006 after parts of his house collapsed over his body, as he was lying in a hammock. Aged only 34, he left two young children.
