= José Luis Diezma =

Spanish footballer and manager

Personal information
- Full name: José Luis Diezma Izquierdo
- Date of birth: 22 September 1968 (age 58)
- Place of birth: Madrid, Spain
- Height: 1.92 m (6 ft 4 in)
- Position: Goalkeeper

Youth career
- 1986–1988: Real Madrid

Senior career*
Years	Team	Apps	(Gls)
1988–1990	Real Madrid B	3	(0)
1988–1989	→ Extremadura (loan)		
1990–1992	Extremadura	66	(0)
1992–1996	Betis	76	(0)
1996–1998	Celta	8	(0)
1998–2000	Numancia	30	(0)
2000	Recreativo	23	(0)
2000–2001	Murcia	21	(0)
2001–2002	Elche	4	(0)
2002–2003	Orihuela	33	(0)
2003–2004	Cartagena	37	(0)
2004–2005	Mérida	36	(0)
Total		337	(0)

Managerial career
- 2006–2010: Real Madrid (youth)
- 2010–2011: Cerro Reyes
- 2011–2013: Ávila
- 2013: Extremadura
- * Club domestic league appearances and goals

José Luis Diezma Izquierdo (born 22 September 1968) is a Spanish retired footballer who played as a goalkeeper, and is a manager.

== Playing career ==
Born in Madrid, Diezma graduated from Real Madrid's youth setup. After making his senior debut while on loan at Tercera División side CF Extremadura in the 1988–89 season, he returned to his parent club and was assigned to the reserves in Segunda División.

Diezma made his professional debut on 17 March 1990, starting in a 3–1 home win against Levante UD. A backup to Santiago Cañizares, he only featured in three matches before returning to Extremadura, now in Segunda División B.

In 1992, after two years as an undisputed starter, Diezma joined Real Betis in the second division, playing a key part in their promotion to La Liga in 1994. However, after the arrival of Pedro Jaro, he was demoted to second-choice, only making his debut in the category on 19 May 1996, in a 1–0 home defeat of Deportivo de La Coruña.

In 1996, Diezma moved to fellow top-tier club Celta de Vigo, acting as a backup option to Richard Dutruel. A move to CD Numancia followed, and he featured regularly during his first season as his side achieved promotion to the top tier.

Completely ostracized by new manager Andoni Goikoetxea, Diezma did not feature in a single match for Numancia during the 1999–2000 campaign, being released in December. He subsequently represented second division sides Recreativo de Huelva, Real Murcia and Elche CF before joining Orihuela CF in the third level in July 2002.

In 2003, Diezma signed for FC Cartagena still in the third division. In July of the following year, he agreed to a contract with Mérida UD in the fourth tier, and retired with the club at the end of the season.

== Managerial career ==
Immediately after retiring Diezma took up coaching, working as a goalkeeping coach in Míchel's staff at Rayo Vallecano. In 2006 he returned to his first club Real Madrid, being in charge of the club's youth categories for four full seasons.

On 28 July 2010, Diezma was appointed manager of AD Cerro de Reyes in the third division, but was dismissed in December. The following July, he was presented as manager of fourth tier club Real Ávila.

On 6 June 2013, Diezma left Ávila after not agreeing to a contract renewal. On 7 July he was appointed at the helm of Extremadura UD, but was relieved from his duties on 9 September.

Diezma subsequently moved abroad, working at football schools in China and Saudi Arabia.
