= Bruno Caires =

Portuguese footballer

Personal information
- Full name: Bruno Ricardo Mendonça de Caires
- Date of birth: 2 April 1976 (age 50)
- Place of birth: Lisbon, Portugal
- Height: 1.84 m (6 ft 0 in)
- Position: Defensive midfielder

Youth career
- 1991–1994: Benfica

Senior career*
Years	Team	Apps	(Gls)
1994–1997	Benfica	35	(2)
1994–1995	→ Belenenses (loan)	15	(0)
1997–1999	Celta	17	(0)
1999–2000	→ Tenerife (loan)	12	(0)
2000–2004	Sporting CP	0	(0)
2001–2004	Sporting B	42	(3)
2002–2003	→ Maia (loan)	26	(1)
2003	→ Covilhã (loan)	13	(0)
2004–2005	Louletano	34	(1)
Total		194	(7)

International career
1991–1992	Portugal U16	12	(0)
1992	Portugal U17	3	(0)
1992–1993	Portugal U18	12	(0)
1994–1995	Portugal U20	13	(1)
1995–1997	Portugal U21	8	(1)
Medal record
Men's football
Representing Portugal
FIFA U-20 World Cup
Third place	1995 Qatar
- * Club domestic league appearances and goals

Bruno Ricardo Mendonça de Caires (born 2 April 1976) is a Portuguese retired footballer who played as a defensive midfielder.

== Club career ==
A product of S.L. Benfica's youth system, Lisbon-born Caires was initially loaned to C.F. Os Belenenses in his first year as senior, where he made his Primeira Liga debut. He returned in the 1995 summer, playing 24 competitive games during the season to help his team finish in second position.

In the 1997 summer, Caires signed for Celta de Vigo, who paid €3.5 million for his services. He made his La Liga debut on 9 November by coming on as a late substitute in a 3–1 away win against CD Tenerife, but his spell in Spain was plagued by injury problems, and he was also loaned to precisely Tenerife in January 2000.

Subsequently, Caires returned to Lisbon, signing for Sporting Clube de Portugal. He mainly played for its B-side in competitive matches, his only first-team appearances being against Real Madrid in the UEFA Champions League and F.C. Famalicão in the Portuguese Cup. He retired in 2005 at the age of only 29 after spells with F.C. Maia, S.C. Covilhã and Louletano DC, the latter two clubs competing in the third tier.

== International career ==
Caires participated with the Portugal under-20 team at the 1995 FIFA World Youth Championship, contributing with six games to an eventual third-place finish in Qatar. All youth categories comprised, he gained 52 caps and scored two goals.

== Personal life ==
He is the son of Eurico Caires, a footballer who represented clubs in Portugal, Canada and the United States.

== Honours ==
Benfica

- Taça de Portugal: 1995–96
