= Rafael Berges =

Spanish footballer and manager

Personal information
- Full name: Rafael Berges Martín
- Date of birth: 21 January 1971 (age 55)
- Place of birth: Córdoba, Spain
- Height: 1.82 m (5 ft 11 1/2 in)
- Position: Left-back

Team information
- Current team: Lynx (head coach)

Youth career
- Córdoba

Senior career*
Years	Team	Apps	(Gls)
1989–1991	Córdoba	70	(2)
1991–1993	Tenerife	42	(1)
1993–2001	Celta	159	(7)
2001–2002	Córdoba	3	(0)
Total		274	(10)

International career
1991	Spain U21	1	(0)
1991–1992	Spain U23	8	(2)

Managerial career
- 2005–2006: Córdoba B
- 2006: Lucena
- 2007: Almería B
- 2008: Séneca (youth)
- 2008: Linares
- 2010–2011: Pozoblanco
- 2012: Córdoba B
- 2012–2013: Córdoba
- 2015: Jaén
- 2016–2017: Logroñés
- 2018: Mitra Kukar
- 2019: Mitra Kukar
- 2020: Badak Lampung
- 2021–2022: Mitra Kukar
- 2025–: Lynx
Medal record
Representing Spain
Men's Football
Gold medal – first place	1992 Barcelona	Team competition
- * Club domestic league appearances and goals

Rafael Berges Martín (born 21 January 1971) is a Spanish former professional footballer who played as a left-back. He is currently manager of Gibraltar Football League club Lynx.

== Club career ==
Born in Córdoba, Andalusia, Berges started playing for local Córdoba CF in the lower leagues. In the 1991–92 campaign he joined CD Tenerife, going on to spend two years in La Liga at the Estadio Heliodoro Rodríguez López.

Signing with RC Celta de Vigo in 1993, Berges went on to make nearly 200 overall appearances and score seven league goals for the Galicians. He took part in no games in his final two seasons, however, due to recurrent injuries.

At the end of 2001–02, aged 31, Berges retired with his first club Córdoba, now in the Segunda División. His second spell was cut short, again due to several physical problems.

== International career ==
Berges was first-choice for Spain at the 1992 Summer Olympics, as the nation won the gold medal on home soil. He scored twice, including in the 2–0 semi-final win over Ghana.

== Coaching career ==
Berges took up coaching in 2005, starting with Córdoba CF B. Among other lowly sides, he would also manage UD Almería's reserves.

On 14 June 2012, Berges was named Córdoba's main squad head coach, replacing Rayo Vallecano-bound Paco Jémez. He was relieved of his duties on 7 April of the following year, with the team ranking ninth in the second division.

In the 2014–15 and 2016–17 campaigns, Berges was in charge of third-tier clubs Real Jaén and UD Logroñés, respectively. He went on to work in Liga 1 (Indonesia), with PS Mitra Kukar and Badak Lampung FC.

Berges returned to Europe in November 2025, being appointed head coach of Gibraltar Football League side Lynx FC.

== Honours ==
Spain U23

- Summer Olympic Games: 1992
