= Haim Revivo =

Israeli footballer and businessman

Haim Revivo חיים רביבו
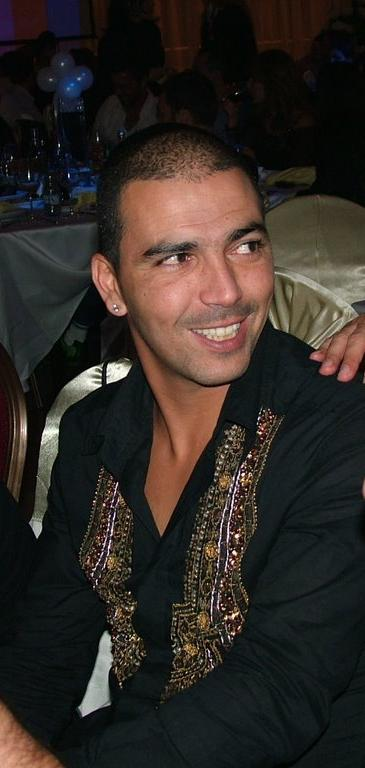

Personal information
- Full name: Haim Michael Revivo
- Date of birth: 22 February 1972 (age 54)
- Place of birth: Ashdod, Israel
- Height: 1.77 m (5 ft 10 in)
- Positions: Attacking midfielder; winger

Youth career
- 1984–1988: Hapoel Ashdod
- 1988–1990: Gadna Tel Aviv Yehuda

Senior career*
Years	Team	Apps	(Gls)
1990–1993	Bnei Yehuda	76	(20)
1993–1994	Hapoel Tel Aviv	36	(12)
1994–1996	Maccabi Haifa	57	(45)
1996–2000	Celta Vigo	124	(23)
2000–2002	Fenerbahçe	68	(30)
2002–2003	Galatasaray	12	(3)
2003–2004	Ashdod	13	(3)
Total		383	(138)

International career
1990	Israel U18	1	(0)
1992–1993	Israel U21	9	(5)
1992–2004	Israel	67	(15)
- * Club domestic league appearances and goals

Haim Michael Revivo (Hebrew: חיים מיכאל רביבו; born 22 February 1972) is an Israeli former professional footballer, who played as an attacking midfielder or winger, and a businessman.

== Early and personal life ==
Revivo is Jewish and was born to a traditional Moroccan Jewish family in Ashdod, Israel.

His son Roy is also a footballer.

== Club career ==
Revivo played football at Hapoel Ashdod until the age of 16 when he transferred to the youth club of Gadna Tel Aviv Yehuda. Revivo liked that the club had no senior team and he would be a free agent once he reached 18. When he turned 19, Giora Spiegel brought him to Bnei Yehuda after both Hapoel Kfar Saba and Maccabi Petah Tikva turned him down. Revivo spent three seasons at Bnei Yehuda before transferring to city rivals, Hapoel.

When Reuven Atar requested to leave Maccabi Haifa for Hapoel Haifa, Ya'akov Shahar was quick to sign a replacement. He brought in Revivo, who was happy to join Haifa since he believed that from there he could get to a European club. In his first season with Haifa, Revivo led the league (along with Amir Turgeman) with 17 goals. In his second season, he wanted to move from the left side of the midfield to the center of the pitch. Then club manager, Giora Spiegel, was reluctant but in order to avoid a fight with his star, he released Alon Mizrahi. Revivo paid off dividends and was once again the league leading goal scorer. Haifa was quick to sell their star to Spanish club, Celta de Vigo.

Revivo enjoyed a revival and became a starter at Celta Vigo. In October 1996, shortly after Revivo joined the club, he made headlines because of the club's league clash on Yom Kippur. Revivo desperately wanted to avoid the match that fell on the Jewish holiday. The club was able to move the match fixture ahead by a couple of hours and Revivo played for as long he could before being brought off in the second half to hurry home for the holiday. He played in Spain a few successful years, and was very popular in Spain. He was named co-winner of the 1998 Israel Sports Figure of the Year Award.

His first two years with Fenerbahçe were a success, and he led the team to the 2001 Turkish championship, but then he lost the attention of the club's management after other famous foreign players were brought in. He decided to leave, and caused much controversy with his move to Istanbul rivals Galatasaray. His spell at Galatasaray only lasted a year before he left Turkey.

After his return to Israel, he signed for Israel's F.C. Ashdod, but after 13 games he retired from football. He is now a successful businessman and one of the former owners of F.C. Ashdod.

== International career ==
Revivo made his first appearance for a national side on 18 December 1990, playing with the Israel national under-18 football team against their Portuguese counterparts at the Estádio da Luz in Lisbon. Revivo played in the midfield along with Avi Nimni and Eyal Berkovic who he would end up playing with most of his national team career.

A year and a half later, Revivo debuted with the Israel national under-21 football team on 13 May 1992 in a friendly against their Turkish counterparts at Herzliya Municipal Stadium in Israel. He scored on his debut and added another four goals in nine appearances, including a brace in a 1994 UEFA European Under-21 Football Championship qualifier against Austria.

Six months after making his under-21 debut, he represented the full side in a 1994 FIFA World Cup qualifier at Ramat Gan Stadium against Sweden. Revivo became a fixture in the national team lineup under Shlomo Scharf and competed for Israel in three FIFA World Cup qualifying campaigns and UEFA European Football Championship qualifying campaigns in addition to 26 friendly matches.

== Honours ==
Bnei Yehuda Tel Aviv

- Toto Cup: 1991–92

Maccabi Haifa

- State Cup: 1994–95

Fenerbahçe

- Süper Lig: 2000–01

Galatasaray

- Süper Lig: runner-up 2002–03

Individual

- Israeli Premier League top scorer: 1994–95, 1995–96
- Israeli Footballer of the Year: 1994–95, 1995–96
- Member of the Israeli Football Hall of Fame
