= Mazinho =

Brazilian footballer and manager (born 1966)

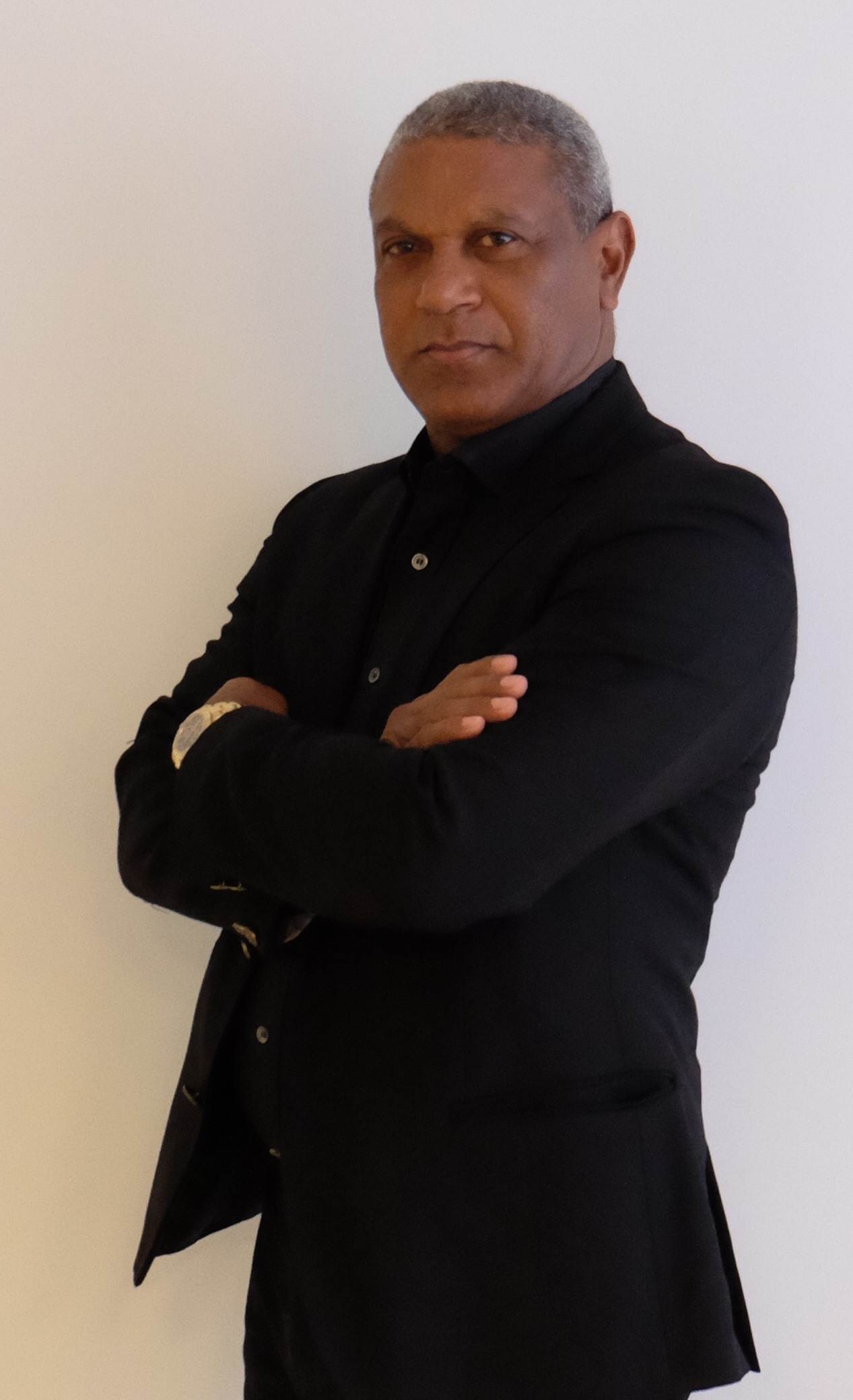
- Mazinho in 2019

Personal information
- Full name: Iomar do Nascimento
- Date of birth: 8 April 1966 (age 60)
- Place of birth: Santa Rita, Paraíba, Brazil
- Height: 1.76 m (5 ft 9 in)
- Positions: Midfielder; full-back

Senior career*
Years	Team	Apps	(Gls)
1985–1990	Vasco da Gama	232	(16)
1990–1991	Lecce	34	(2)
1991–1992	Fiorentina	21	(0)
1992–1994	Palmeiras	127	(2)
1994–1996	Valencia	71	(0)
1996–2000	Celta Vigo	114	(8)
2000–2001	Elche	17	(0)
2001	Vitória	15	(0)
Total		631	(28)

International career
1989–1994	Brazil	35	(0)

Managerial career
- 2009: Aris
Medal record
Men's Football
Representing Brazil
FIFA World Cup
Winner	1994 USA
Copa América
Winner	1989 Brazil
Runner-up	1991 Chile
Olympic Games
Silver medal – second place	1988 Seoul	Team
- * Club domestic league appearances and goals

Iomar do Nascimento (born 8 April 1966), known as Mazinho, is a Brazilian former professional footballer and manager. A versatile player, he operated as a defensive midfielder and a full-back, having begun his career in the latter position before moving into midfield. Following his retirement, he managed Greek club Aris from January to November 2009.

At senior international level, Mazinho earned 35 caps for the Brazil national team. He won the 1989 Copa América and the 1994 FIFA World Cup, and was part of the team that earned the silver medal at the 1988 Summer Olympics. He was also included in Brazil's squad for the 1990 FIFA World Cup and represented the country at the 1991 Copa América.

== Club career ==
Mazinho played with Vasco da Gama, Palmeiras and Vitória in his homeland, with Lecce and Fiorentina in Italy, and with Valencia, Celta de Vigo and Elche in Spain. Starting his career as left back, he moved to the midfield in the early 1990s.

Mazinho was a three-time winner of the Campeonato Brasileiro (Brazilian championship) with Vasco da Gama and Palmeiras. He received the Brazilian Silver Ball award in 1987 and 1988.

== International career ==
Mazinho earned 35 caps with the Brazil national team, the first coming in May 1989 in a friendly against Peru and the last during the 1994 FIFA World Cup. At the 1994 World Cup, a tournament Brazil went on to win, he was the third member of the "three men and a baby" celebration with Bebeto and Romário in the quarter-final win against the Netherlands. Mazinho was also a Copa América winner in 1989, at which point he was playing as a full-back.

Another player nicknamed "Mazinho" – Waldemar Aureliano de Oliveira Filho – played for Brazil at the 1991 Copa América, and was known as "Mazinho Oliveira" or "Mazinho II" to avoid confusion between the two men.

== Managing career ==
In January 2009, Mazinho was appointed head coach of Greek side Aris, replacing Spanish Quique Hernández. Mazinho, however, was later replaced with former Valencia coach Héctor Cúper in November 2009.

=== Statistics ===
Team	Nat	From	To	Record				
Team	Nat	From	To	G	W	D	L	Win %
Aris Thessaloniki	(Greece)	21 January 2009	2 November 2009	23	11	7	5	47.83
Total				23	11	7	5	47.83

== Personal life ==
Mazinho is the father of football players Thiago and Rafinha. His wife, Valéria Alcântara, was a former volleyball player.

== Honours ==
Vasco da Gama

- Campeonato Carioca: 1987, 1988
- Campeonato Brasileiro Série A: 1989
- Troféu Ramón de Carranza: 1987, 1988, 1989
- Taça Guanabara: 1986, 1987, 1990
- Taça Rio: 1988

Palmeiras

- Campeonato Brasileiro Série A: 1993, 1994
- Campeonato Paulista: 1993, 1994
- Torneio Rio–São Paulo: 1993

Brazil

- FIFA World Cup: 1994
- Copa América: 1989

Individual

- Placar Bola de Prata: 1987, 1988, 1989
- South American Footballer of the Year Silver Ball: 1989
- South American Team of the Year: 1989
