= Adriano Teixeira =

Brazilian footballer and manager (born 1973)

Personal information
- Full name: Adriano Félix Teixeira
- Date of birth: 7 April 1973 (age 53)
- Place of birth: Fortaleza, Brazil
- Height: 1.82 m (5 ft 11 1/2 in)
- Position: Centre back

Youth career
- 1991: Ferroviário

Senior career*
Years	Team	Apps	(Gls)
1992	Ferroviário		
1993–1996	Sport	46	(0)
1996–2000	Celta	23	(0)
1997–1998	→ Fluminense (loan)	30	(1)
2000–2003	Compostela	116	(10)
2003–2004	Cultural Leonesa	29	(7)
2005	Vasco da Gama	2	(0)
2005–2007	Santa Cruz	66	(2)
Total		312	(20)

International career
1995	Brazil U20		
1995	Brazil	1	(0)

Managerial career
- 2014–2018: Santa Cruz (assistant)
- 2014: Santa Cruz (interim)
- 2016: Santa Cruz (interim)
- 2016: Santa Cruz (interim)
- 2017: Santa Cruz (interim)
- 2017: Santa Cruz (interim)
- 2018: Santa Cruz (interim)
- * Club domestic league appearances and goals

Adriano Félix Teixeira (born 7 April 1973) is a Brazilian retired footballer who played as a central defender, and is a manager. He made one appearance for the Brazil national team in 1995.

== Club career ==
Adriano was born in Fortaleza, Ceará, and made his debut as a senior with Ferroviário in 1992, in Série C. The following year he moved to neighbouring Sport, spending three full seasons in Série A.

Adriano moved abroad in the 1996 summer, signing for La Liga club Celta de Vigo. He made his debut in the competition on 8 December, coming on as a first half substitute in a 2–1 home win against Racing de Ferrol.

Despite appearing in 20 matches during his first year, Adriano returned to his homeland in 1997 after agreeing to a one-year loan deal at Fluminense. He returned to the Galicians in the following year, and appeared rarely before moving to Segunda División club SD Compostela in January 2000.

At Compos Adriano established himself as a regular starter, scoring a career-best seven goals in 2001–02 as his side achieved promotion from Segunda División B. In 2003, after suffering relegation (his second at the club), he joined third-tier club Cultural y Deportiva Leonesa.

Adriano returned to Brazil in 2005, and subsequently represented Vasco da Gama and Santa Cruz, retiring with the latter in 2007 at the age of 34. In 2014, he returned to the latter, being appointed assistant manager.

In 2016 Adriano was in charge of the first team during three times, all of them as an interim, following the dismissals of Marcelo Martelotte, Milton Mendes and Doriva.

== Honours ==
=== Club ===
Sport

- Campeonato Pernambucano: 1994, 1996
- Copa do Nordeste: 1994

=== International ===
Brazil U20

- Toulon Tournament: 1995
