= Moisés García (footballer, born 1971) =

Spanish footballer

Moisés
Personal information
- Full name: Moisés García León
- Date of birth: 10 July 1971 (age 55)
- Place of birth: Seville, Spain
- Height: 1.85 m (6 ft 1 in)
- Position: Centre-forward

Youth career
- AD Loyola
- Zaragoza

Senior career*
Years	Team	Apps	(Gls)
1988–1991	Zaragoza B	76	(33)
1988–1994	Zaragoza	42	(8)
1994–1996	Osasuna	50	(11)
1996	Leganés	16	(13)
1997–1998	Celta	23	(7)
1998–2001	Villarreal	93	(28)
2001–2002	Sevilla	43	(14)
2003	Córdoba	23	(5)
2003–2005	Elche	74	(27)
2005–2007	Hércules	70	(22)
2007	Poli Ejido	4	(0)
2008–2009	Gimnàstic	53	(12)
2009–2010	Huesca	33	(4)
2010–2011	La Muela	28	(3)
Total		628	(187)

International career
1988–1989	Spain U19	4	(2)
1989	Spain U20	3	(1)

Managerial career
- 2011–2012: Huesca (assistant)
- 2012–2013: Hércules (assistant)
- 2013–2014: Zaragoza (assistant)
- * Club domestic league appearances and goals

Moisés García León (born 10 July 1971), known simply as Moisés, is a Spanish former professional footballer who played as a centre-forward.

He played for 13 teams in a 23-year career – including Zaragoza, Celta, Villarreal and Sevilla in La Liga – while totalling 524 games and 151 goals, 163 matches and 40 goals being in the top flight.

== Playing career ==
A product of Real Zaragoza's youth system, Moisés was born in Seville, Andalusia, and raised in La Rioja. He was only 17 when he made his debut with the first team on 6 November 1988 in a 2–1 home win against Real Murcia CF, being the youngest player to ever appear in La Liga for the club; however, he could never break into the starting XI.

After two and a half seasons in the Segunda División, with CA Osasuna and CD Leganés, Moisés returned to the top flight when he joined RC Celta de Vigo in January 1997, but featured irregularly during his spell in Galicia. In 1999–2000, he was instrumental in helping Villarreal CF return to the latter competition as he scored 17 goals, joint-second best in the competition.

Moisés managed to stay in the Spanish top flight until December 2002, receiving relative playing time with both Villarreal and Sevilla FC. From there onwards, he resumed his career solely in the second tier, continuing to excel at scoring (in 2007–08, his goals proved crucial in the campaign's final stretch as Gimnàstic de Tarragona finally escaped the relegation zone).

Aged 39, Moisés signed with amateurs CD La Muela, promoted to the Segunda División B for the first time ever, thus returning to his native region after a two-decade absence. Following their relegation, he retired.

== Coaching career ==
Subsequently, Moisés returned to his former club SD Huesca, joining Quique Hernández's coaching staff early into the 2011–12 season as the pair helped the team finally retain their second division status.

On 22 October 2012, in the same capacity and league, he joined Hércules CF and reunited with Hernández, who had been appointed following the dismissal of Juan Carlos Mandiá.

== Personal life ==
Moisés' brothers, Eduardo, Gerardo and Manuel, were also professional footballers. The second, a defender, represented most notably Málaga CF.

== Honours ==
Zaragoza

- Copa del Rey: 1993–94
