= Richard Dutruel =

French footballer (born 1972)

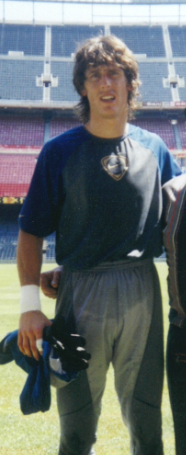

Personal information
- Full name: Richard Philippe Dutruel
- Date of birth: 24 December 1972 (age 53)
- Place of birth: Thonon-les-Bains, Haute-Savoie, France
- Height: 1.92 m (6 ft 4 in)
- Position: Goalkeeper

Youth career
- CS Thonon
- Clairefontaine
- Paris Saint-Germain

Senior career*
| Years | Team | Apps | (Gls) |
| 1991–1996 | Paris Saint-Germain | 10 | (0) |
| 1993–1995 | → Caen (loan) | 68 | (0) |
| 1996–2000 | Celta | 128 | (0) |
| 2000–2002 | Barcelona | 15 | (0) |
| 2002–2003 | Alavés | 33 | (0) |
| 2003–2005 | Strasbourg | 24 | (0) |
| Total | | 278 | (0) |

International career
| 2000 | France | 1 | (0) |
- * Club domestic league appearances and goals

Richard Philippe Dutruel (born 24 December 1972) is a French retired professional footballer who played as a goalkeeper.

== Early life and club career ==
Dutruel was born in Thonon-les-Bains, Haute-Savoie. During his career he represented Paris Saint-Germain FC, Stade Malherbe Caen, RC Celta de Vigo (his most successful period, also appearing in the UEFA Cup), FC Barcelona – during his two seasons he played backup to youngster Pepe Reina in his first year, only being third-choice afterwards– Deportivo Alavés and RC Strasbourg, retiring in June 2005 at nearly 33.

== International career ==
Dutruel won his sole cap for France on 4 October 2000, coming on as a substitute in a 1–1 friendly match against Cameroon.
