= 1992–93 Deportivo de La Coruña season =

Real Club Deportivo de La Coruña
1992–93 season
- President: Augusto César Lendoiro
- Manager: Arsenio Iglesias
- Stadium: Estadio Riazor
- La Liga: 3rd
- Copa del Rey: Fourth round
- Top goalscorer: League: Bebeto (29); All: Bebeto (29)
Home colours

Real Club Deportivo de La Coruña 1992-1993 season included its 28th season in La Liga, where it finished in 3rd place. The club also competed in the Copa del Rey.

== Summary ==
Having only survived their first season back in La Liga thanks to a relegation playoff victory over Real Betis, Deportivo's 1992–93 season represented a vast improvement. Coach Arsenio Iglesias, the architect of their promotion in 1990–91, had returned to the club to begin his fourth spell as manager in the middle of the previous season, following the sacking of Marco Antonio Boronat, and guided Depor to third place in the league, only four points behind champions Barcelona. This was their best finish in the top flight since finishing as runners-up in 1949–50. Brazilian striker Bebeto, signed that summer from Vasco da Gama, scored 29 goals in the league, which was enough to become the first Deportivo player in history to win the Pichichi Trophy. They had less success in the Copa del Rey, where they were eliminated on penalties in the fourth round by Segunda División side Mérida.

== Players ==
=== Squad ===
Note: Flags indicate national team as defined under FIFA eligibility rules; some limited exceptions apply. Players may hold more than one non-FIFA nationality.

No.	Pos.	Nation	Player
—	GK	ESP	Juan Canales
—	GK	ESP	Josu
—	GK	ESP	Francisco Liaño
—	DF	ESP	Alberto Albístegui
—	DF	ESP	Sabin Bilbao
—	DF	ESP	Antonio Doncel
—	DF	YUG	Miroslav Đukić
—	DF	ESP	Mariano Hoyas
—	DF	ESP	Luis López Rekarte
—	DF	ESP	Nando
—	DF	ESP	José Luis Ribera
—	DF	ESP	Ricardo Jesús Serna
—	DF	BUL	Georgi Slavchev (on loan from Levski Sofia)

No.	Pos.	Nation	Player
—	MF	ESP	Adolfo Aldana
—	MF	ESP	Fran
—	MF	BUL	Iliyan Kiryakov
—	MF	ESP	Juan María Mújica
—	MF	ESP	José Ramón
—	MF	BRA	Mauro Silva
—	MF	ESP	Marcos Vales
—	FW	BRA	Bebeto
—	FW	ESP	Claudio Barragán
—	FW	ESP	Juanito
—	FW	BUL	Atanas Kirov
—	FW	ESP	Ramón
—	FW	ESP	Joaquín Villa

==== Left club during season ====
Note: Flags indicate national team as defined under FIFA eligibility rules; some limited exceptions apply. Players may hold more than one non-FIFA nationality.

No.	Pos.	Nation	Player
—	FW	ESP	Arturo (to Lugo)

=== Transfers ===
==== In ====
Pos	Player	From	Notes
Summer
DF	(Spain) Nando	(Spain) Valencia	Free
MF	(Spain) Adolfo Aldana	(Spain) Real Madrid	Free
MF	(Brazil) Mauro Silva	(Brazil) Bragantino	250 million Pta (€1.6 million)
FW	(Brazil) Bebeto	(Brazil) Vasco da Gama	
FW	(Spain) Juanito	(Spain) Compostela	
FW	(Bulgaria) Atanas Kirov	(Spain) Málaga	
FW	(Spain) Ramón	(Spain) Sevilla	Free
Winter
DF	(Spain) Ricardo Jesús Serna	(Spain) Barcelona	
DF	(Bulgaria) Georgi Slavchev	(Bulgaria) Levski Sofia	Loan

==== Out ====
Pos	Player	To	Notes
Summer
MF	(Spain) Jon Aspiazu	(Spain) Sestao Sport	
MF	(Brazil) Dinho	(Brazil) São Paulo	
FW	(Spain) Arturo	(Spain) Lugo	
FW	(Federal Republic of Yugoslavia) Zoran Stojadinović	(Spain) Figueres	

== Competitions ==
=== La Liga ===
==== League table ====
Pos	Team	Pld	W	D	L	GF	GA	GD	Pts	Qualification or relegation
1	Barcelona (C)	38	25	8	5	87	34	+53	58	Qualification for the Champions League first round
2	Real Madrid	38	24	9	5	75	28	+47	57	Qualification for the Cup Winners' Cup first round (Note: Real Madrid entered European Cup Winners' Cup as winners of 1992–93 Copa del Rey.)
3	Deportivo La Coruña	38	22	10	6	67	33	+34	54	Qualification for the UEFA Cup first round
4	Valencia	38	19	10	9	60	33	+27	48	Qualification for the UEFA Cup first round
5	Tenerife	38	15	14	9	59	47	+12	44	Qualification for the UEFA Cup first round

Source: LFP
Rules for classification: 1) points; 2) head-to-head points; 3) head-to-head goal difference; 4) head-to-head goals scored; 5) goal difference; 6) number of goals scored.
(C) Champions

==== Positions by round ====
Team ╲ Round	1	2	3	4	5	6	7	8	9	10	11	12	13	14	15	16	17	18	19	20	21	22	23	24	25	26	27	28	29	30	31	32	33	34	35	36	37	38
Deportivo La Coruña	2	1	1	1	1	1	1	1	1	1	4	4	2	2	2	2	2	2	2	1	1	1	1	3	3	3	3	3	3	3	3	3	3	3	3	3	3	3

Leader, Champions League first round
UEFA Cup first round

==== Matches ====
6 September 1992 1	Deportivo La Coruña	2 – 0	Celta Vigo	A Coruña, Spain
	Bebeto 30' (pen.); Barragán 35'	Report		Stadium: Estadio Riazor; Referee: José María García-Aranda

13 September 1992 2	Sevilla	1 – 3	Deportivo La Coruña	Seville, Spain
	Conte 53'	Report	24' Barragán; 27' Fran; 75' Bebeto	Stadium: Ramón Sánchez Pizjuán; Referee: Carmelo Rodríguez Martel

20 September 1992 3	Deportivo La Coruña	2 – 1	Osasuna	A Coruña, Spain
	Bebeto 37'; Nando 64'	Report	86' Cholo	Stadium: Estadio Riazor; Referee: Ángel Calvo Córdova

26 September 1992 4	Real Sociedad	0 – 2	Deportivo La Coruña	San Sebastián, Spain
		Report	46' Barragán; 85' Aldana	Stadium: Atotxa Stadium; Referee: Juan Sánchez Moreno

3 October 1992 5	Deportivo La Coruña	3 – 2	Real Madrid	A Coruña, Spain
	Bebeto 35', 65'; Rocha 80' (o.g.)	Report	21' Hierro; 25' Zamorano	Stadium: Estadio Riazor; Referee: Miguel Marín López

7 October 1992 6	Tenerife	3 – 1	Deportivo La Coruña	Santa Cruz de Tenerife, Spain
	Chano 24'; Felipe Miñambres 27'; Redondo 60'	Report	3' Aldana	Stadium: Heliodoro Rodríguez López; Referee: José Rubio Valdivieso

17 October 1992 7	Deportivo La Coruña	1 – 0	Barcelona	A Coruña, Spain
	Bebeto 63'	Report		Stadium: Estadio Riazor; Referee: Manuel Díaz Vega

25 October 1992 8	Real Burgos	0 – 0	Deportivo La Coruña	Burgos, Spain
		Report		Stadium: Estadio El Plantío; Referee: Antonio López Nieto

1 November 1992 9	Deportivo La Coruña	2 – 1	Sporting de Gijón	A Coruña, Spain
	Fran 6'; Bebeto 80'	Report	87' Scotto	Stadium: Estadio Riazor; Referee: José Carcelén García

8 November 1992 10	Albacete Balompié	1 – 1	Deportivo La Coruña	Albacete, Spain
	Geli 52'	Report	80' Barragán	Stadium: Estadio Carlos Belmonte; Referee: Juan Ansuátegui Roca

22 November 1992 11	Atlético Madrid	2 – 1	Deportivo La Coruña	Madrid, Spain
	Juanito 26', 50'	Report	82' Bebeto	Stadium: Vicente Calderón Stadium; Referee: José Pajares Paz

29 November 1992 12	Deportivo La Coruña	0 – 0	Valencia	A Coruña, Spain
		Report		Stadium: Estadio Riazor; Referee: Joaquín Urío Velázquez

6 December 1992 13	Logroñés	0 – 3	Deportivo La Coruña	Logroño, Spain
		Report	55', 89' Barragán; 75' Bebeto	Stadium: Estadio Las Gaunas; Referee: Francisco Santamaría Uzqueda

13 December 1992 14	Deportivo La Coruña	3 – 0	Athletic Bilbao	A Coruña, Spain
	Aldana 6'; Bebeto 17', 46'	Report		Stadium: Estadio Riazor; Referee: Juan Fernández Marín

20 December 1992 15	Real Zaragoza	0 – 2	Deportivo La Coruña	Zaragoza, Spain
		Report	7' Barragán; 24' (pen.) Bebeto	Stadium: La Romareda; Referee: Clemente Rivas Fernández

3 January 1993 16	Deportivo La Coruña	3 – 0	Español	A Coruña, Spain
	Bebeto 1' (pen.), 64', 80'	Report		Stadium: Estadio Riazor; Referee: Carmelo Rodríguez Martel

10 January 1993 17	Cádiz	0 – 3	Deportivo La Coruña	Cádiz, Spain
		Report	28', 64' Bebeto; 71' Fran	Stadium: Ramón de Carranza; Referee: Francesc Casajuana Rifà

17 January 1993 18	Deportivo La Coruña	2 – 1	Real Oviedo	A Coruña, Spain
	Bebeto 43' (pen.); Barragán 49'	Report	89' Janković	Stadium: Estadio Riazor; Referee: José Núñez Manrique

23 January 1993 19	Rayo Vallecano	1 – 1	Deportivo La Coruña	Madrid, Spain
	Riesco 9'	Report	89' Bebeto	Stadium: Nuevo Estadio de Vallecas; Referee: Juan Andújar Oliver

31 January 1993 20	Celta Vigo	0 – 0	Deportivo La Coruña	Vigo, Spain
		Report		Stadium: Balaídos; Referee: Antonio Martin Navarrete

6 February 1993 21	Deportivo La Coruña	2 – 0	Sevilla	A Coruña, Spain
	Fran 57'; Aldana 85'	Report		Stadium: Estadio Riazor; Referee: Bartolomé Riera Morro

14 February 1993 22	Osasuna	1 – 1	Deportivo La Coruña	Pamplona, Spain
	Kosecki 29'	Report	48' Fran	Stadium: El Sadar; Referee: Juan Ansuátegui Roca

21 February 1993 23	Deportivo La Coruña	5 – 1	Real Sociedad	A Coruña, Spain
	Aldana 11', 64'; López Rekarte 15'; Bebeto 34'; Fran 74'	Report	44' Imanol Alguacil	Stadium: Estadio Riazor; Referee: Juan Brito Arceo

27 February 1993 24	Real Madrid	2 – 1	Deportivo La Coruña	Madrid, Spain
	Zamorano 55'; Míchel 84'	Report	33' Barragán	Stadium: Santiago Bernabéu Stadium; Referee: Antonio López Nieto

7 March 1993 25	Deportivo La Coruña	2 – 2	Tenerife	A Coruña, Spain
	Fran 14'; Bebeto 76'	Report	88' Dertycia; 89' Castillo	Stadium: Estadio Riazor; Referee: Severo Javier González Lecue

13 March 1993 26	Barcelona	3 – 0	Deportivo La Coruña	Barcelona, Spain
	Goikoetxea 26'; Amor 43'; Koeman 57' (pen.)	Report		Stadium: Camp Nou; Referee: Antonio Martin Navarrete

21 March 1993 27	Deportivo La Coruña	5 – 0	Real Burgos	A Coruña, Spain
	Ribera 3'; Barragán 10', 83'; Bebeto 39', 70'	Report		Stadium: Estadio Riazor; Referee: Joaquín Urío Velázquez

4 April 1993 28	Sporting de Gijón	0 – 1	Deportivo La Coruña	Gijón, Spain
		Report	89' Albístegui	Stadium: El Molinón; Referee: Juan Sánchez Moreno

11 April 1993 29	Deportivo La Coruña	3 – 2	Albacete Balompié	A Coruña, Spain
	Barragán 1'; Aldana 42'; Bebeto 48'	Report	10' Fernández; 77' Zalazar	Stadium: Estadio Riazor; Referee: Manuel Díaz Vega

17 April 1993 30	Deportivo La Coruña	1 – 1	Atlético Madrid	A Coruña, Spain
	Bebeto 14' (pen.)	Report	70' (pen.) Vizcaíno	Stadium: Estadio Riazor; Referee: José Pérez Sánchez

1 May 1993 31	Valencia	3 – 0	Deportivo La Coruña	Valencia, Spain
	Penev 24', 29', 46'	Report		Stadium: Estadio Luis Casanova; Referee: Celino Gracia Redondo

9 May 1993 32	Deportivo La Coruña	0 – 1	Logroñés	A Coruña, Spain
		Report	64' Salenko	Stadium: Estadio Riazor; Referee: Ricardo Alfonso Álvarez

16 May 1993 33	Athletic Bilbao	0 – 1	Deportivo La Coruña	Bilbao, Spain
		Report	72' Barragán	Stadium: San Mamés; Referee: Juan Ansuátegui Roca

23 May 1993 34	Deportivo La Coruña	1 – 0	Real Zaragoza	A Coruña, Spain
	Vales 58'	Report		Stadium: Estadio Riazor; Referee: Carmelo Rodríguez Martel

30 May 1993 35	Español	0 – 2	Deportivo La Coruña	Barcelona, Spain
		Report	3' (o.g.) Mokh; 53' Bebeto	Stadium: Sarrià Stadium; Referee: Juan Andújar Oliver

5 June 1993 36	Deportivo La Coruña	3 – 0	Cádiz	A Coruña, Spain
	Ribera 49'; Bebeto 68' (pen.); Đukić 89'	Report		Stadium: Estadio Riazor; Referee: José Núñez Manrique

13 June 1993 37	Real Oviedo	3 – 3	Deportivo La Coruña	Oviedo, Spain
	Carlos 15', 71'; Vinyals 60'	Report	27' (o.g.) Gorriarán; 41', 72' Bebeto	Stadium: Estadio Carlos Tartiere; Referee: Juan Brito Arceo

19 June 1993 38	Deportivo La Coruña	1 – 1	Rayo Vallecano	A Coruña, Spain
	Nando 4'	Report	67' García Cortés	Stadium: Estadio Riazor; Referee: Francesc Casajuana Rifà

== Statistics ==
=== Players statistics ===
Last updated on 1 May 2021.

No.	Pos	Nat	Player	Total		La Liga		Copa del Rey	
No.	Pos	Nat	Player	Apps	Goals	Apps	Goals	Apps	Goals
	GK	(Spain) ESP	Francisco Liaño	37	0	37	0	0	0
	DF	(Spain) ESP	Luis López Rekarte	37	1	36	1	0+1	0
	DF	(Spain) ESP	Alberto Albístegui	37	1	33	1	4	0
	DF	(Federal Republic of Yugoslavia) YUG	Miroslav Đukić	41	1	38	1	3	0
	DF	(Spain) ESP	José Luis Ribera	38	2	35	2	3	0
	DF	(Spain) ESP	Nando	37	2	35	2	1+1	0
	MF	(Spain) ESP	Adolfo Aldana	34	8	28+2	7	3+1	1
	MF	(Spain) ESP	Fran	41	7	38	7	0+3	0
	MF	(Brazil) BRA	Mauro Silva	38	0	37	0	1	0
	FW	(Brazil) BRA	Bebeto	38	29	37	29	0+1	0
	FW	(Spain) ESP	Claudio Barragán	36	16	34	13	2	3
	GK	(Spain) ESP	Josu	5	0	1	0	4	0
	DF	(Spain) ESP	Mariano Hoyas	24	1	9+11	0	4	1
	DF	(Spain) ESP	Antonio Doncel	14	0	9+1	0	4	0
	MF	(Spain) ESP	José Ramón	18	0	8+10	0	0	0
	DF	(Spain) ESP	Sabin Bilbao	5	0	2+1	0	2	0
	FW	(Spain) ESP	Joaquín Villa	10	0	1+5	0	4	0
	MF	(Spain) ESP	Juan María Mújica	13	2	0+10	0	3	2
	MF	(Spain) ESP	Marcos Vales	8	1	0+8	1	0	0
	MF	(Bulgaria) BUL	Iliyan Kiryakov	6	0	0+3	0	3	0
	FW	(Spain) ESP	Juanito	1	0	0+1	0	0	0
	DF	(Spain) ESP	Ricardo Jesús Serna	1	0	0+1	0	0	0
	GK	(Spain) ESP	Juan Canales	0	0	0	0	0	0
	DF	(Bulgaria) BUL	Georgi Slavchev	0	0	0	0	0	0
	FW	(Bulgaria) BUL	Atanas Kirov	0	0	0	0	0	0
	FW	(Spain) ESP	Ramón	0	0	0	0	0	0
Players who have left the club after the start of the season:
	FW	(Spain) ESP	Arturo	1	4	0	0	0+1	4
