= 1995–96 Deportivo de La Coruña season =

Deportivo de La Coruña
1995–96 season
- President: Augusto César Lendoiro
- Manager: John Toshack
- Stadium: Estadio Riazor
- La Liga: 9th
- Copa del Rey: Round of 16
- UEFA Cup Winners' Cup: Semi-finals
- Supercopa de España: Winners
- Top goalscorer: League: Bebeto (25); All: Bebeto (32)
Home colours	Away colours

Deportivo La Coruña's 1995–96 season included its 31st appearance in La Liga, where it ranked in 9th place. The club also competed in the Copa del Rey, the UEFA Cup Winners' Cup and the Supercopa de España.

== Summary ==
1994–95 had been a great season for Deportivo, as they finished as La Liga runners-up for the second consecutive season and won the Copa del Rey for the first time in their history. However, coach Arsenio Iglesias retired at the end of the season, and was replaced ahead of the new campaign by Welshman John Toshack, formerly of Real Sociedad.

Depor's Copa del Rey win qualified them for the 1995 Supercopa de España, and Toshack's reign got off to a great start in the two legged final against Real Madrid. After a goalless first half at Estadio Riazor, Real goalkeeper Francisco Buyo was sent off shortly after the interval, and Donato scored the resulting penalty to give Deportivo the lead. The hosts scored twice more in the next ten minutes, through Fran and Bebeto, to take a commanding lead, and received a late bonus as Mikel Lasa became the second Madrid player to be dismissed. In the second leg at Santiago Bernabéu Stadium, Real captain Fernando Hierro gave them a lifeline in the first half, but Depor struck twice in the last ten minutes via substitutes Javier Manjarín and Txiki Begiristain to earn an emphatic 5–1 aggregate victory.

Another reward for their cup victory the previous year was entry into the 1995–96 UEFA Cup Winners' Cup, and their debut in the competition was a strong one. After beating compatriots and defending champions Real Zaragoza in the quarter-finals, Deportivo faced French side Paris Saint-Germain in the semi-finals. However, a goal in each leg from PSG saw Depor eliminated by the eventual champions.

The season was more troubling domestically. Having finished in the top three in La Liga in each of the previous seasons, Deportivo slipped to ninth in Toshack's first campaign in charge. Their defense of the Copa del Rey crown also ended in the worst possible fashion, as they were eliminated at the first hurdle by Tenerife after a 3–2 aggregate defeat.

== Players ==
=== Squad ===
Note: Flags indicate national team as defined under FIFA eligibility rules; some limited exceptions apply. Players may hold more than one non-FIFA nationality.

No.	Pos.	Nation	Player
1	GK	ESP	Francisco Liaño
2	DF	ESP	Voro
3	DF	ESP	Luis López Rekarte
4	DF	ESP	José Luis Ribera
5	DF	YUG	Miroslav Đukić
6	DF	ESP	Paco Jémez
7	DF	ESP	Nando
8	MF	ESP	Alfredo Santaelena
9	FW	RUS	Dmitri Radchenko
10	MF	ESP	Fran (captain)
11	FW	BRA	Bebeto
12	MF	ESP	Donato
13	GK	ESP	Agustín Elduayen
14	MF	ESP	Txiki Begiristain

No.	Pos.	Nation	Player
15	MF	BRA	Mauro Silva
16	FW	ESP	Javier Manjarín
17	DF	ESP	Francisco Villarroya
18	MF	ESP	Rafael Martín Vázquez
19	MF	ESP	Adolfo Aldana
21	MF	YUG	Branko Milovanović
22	GK	ESP	Juan Canales
23	FW	ESP	David Fernández
24	MF	ESP	Emilio Viqueira
25	FW	ESP	Braulio
30	FW	ESP	Maikel
31	DF	ESP	José Manuel Aira
—	MF	ESP	Juan Luis Cascallar

==== Left club during season ====
Note: Flags indicate national team as defined under FIFA eligibility rules; some limited exceptions apply. Players may hold more than one non-FIFA nationality.

No.	Pos.	Nation	Player
20	FW	ESP	Pedro Riesco (on loan to Albacete Balompié)

=== Transfers ===
==== In ====
#	Pos	Player	From	Notes
Summer
9	FW	(Russia) Dmitri Radchenko	(Spain) Racing Santander	
14	MF	(Spain) Txiki Begiristain	(Spain) Barcelona	
18	MF	(Spain) Rafael Martín Vázquez	(Spain) Real Madrid	
20	FW	(Spain) Pedro Riesco	(Spain) Real Valladolid	Loan return
21	MF	(Federal Republic of Yugoslavia) Branko Milovanović	(Federal Republic of Yugoslavia) OFK Beograd	

==== Out ====
#	Pos	Player	To	Notes
Summer
	MF	(Spain) José Ramón	(Spain) Compostela	
	FW	(Spain) Claudio Barragán	(Spain) Salamanca	
	FW	(Spain) Julio Salinas	(Spain) Sporting de Gijón	
Winter
20	FW	(Spain) Pedro Riesco	(Spain) Albacete Balompié	Loan

=== Statistics ===
Last updated on 17 April 2021.

No.	Pos	Nat	Player	Total		La Liga		Copa del Rey		Cup Winners' Cup	
No.	Pos	Nat	Player	Apps	Goals	Apps	Goals	Apps	Goals	Apps	Goals
1	GK	(Spain) ESP	Liaño	43	0	35	0	2	0	6	0
3	DF	(Spain) ESP	Lopez Rekarte	31	2	21+6	2	1	0	2+1	0
2	DF	(Spain) ESP	Voro	39	0	29+1	0	1	0	8	0
6	DF	(Spain) ESP	Paco Jémez	45	1	34+2	1	2	0	7	0
5	DF	(Federal Republic of Yugoslavia) YUG	Djukic	44	0	35	0	2	0	7	0
17	DF	(Spain) ESP	Villarroya	30	0	21+4	0	0	0	5	0
12	MF	(Brazil) BRA	Donato	48	10	33+6	5	2	2	6+1	3
10	MF	(Spain) ESP	Fran	41	3	29+4	3	2	0	6	0
8	MF	(Spain) ESP	Alfredo	36	1	24+4	1	1+1	0	4+2	0
16	FW	(Spain) ESP	Manjarin	48	8	34+4	8	1+1	0	7+1	0
11	FW	(Brazil) BRA	Bebeto	41	31	34	25	2	0	5	6
22	GK	(Spain) ESP	Juan Canales	9	0	7	0	0	0	2	0
19	MF	(Spain) ESP	Aldana	43	7	20+13	6	0+2	0	4+4	1
14	MF	(Spain) ESP	Begiristain	42	3	20+13	2	2	0	4+3	1
7	DF	(Spain) ESP	Nando	30	0	18+6	0	2	0	3+1	0
15	MF	(Brazil) BRA	Mauro Silva	26	0	18+4	0	2	0	2	0
4	DF	(Spain) ESP	Ribera	17	0	14+1	0	0	0	2	0
9	FW	(Russia) RUS	Radchenko	34	7	13+15	5	0+1	0	5	2
24	MF	(Spain) ESP	Viqueira	25	0	12+7	0	0	0	2+4	0
23	FW	(Spain) ESP	David Fernández	26	4	4+18	3	0+1	0	0+3	1
21	MF	(Federal Republic of Yugoslavia) YUG	Milovanovic	13	0	4+8	0	0	0	0+1	0
18	MF	(Spain) ESP	Martin Vazquez	6	0	2+3	0	0	0	0+1	0
31	DF	(Spain) ESP	Aira	1	0	1	0	0	0	0	0
25	FW	(Spain) ESP	Braulio	2	0	0+2	0	0	0	0	0
30	FW	(Spain) ESP	Maikel	1	0	0+1	0	0	0	0	0
	MF	(Spain) ESP	Juan Luis Cascallar	1	0	0	0	0	0	1	0
13	GK	(Spain) ESP	Elduayen	0	0	0	0	0	0	0	0
Players who have left the club after the start of the season:
20	FW	(Spain) ESP	Riesco	1	0	0	0	0	0	0+1	0

== Competitions ==
=== La Liga ===
==== League table ====
Pos	Team	Pld	W	D	L	GF	GA	GD	Pts
7	Real Sociedad	42	17	12	13	62	53	+9	63
8	Real Betis	42	16	14	12	61	54	+7	62
9	Deportivo La Coruña	42	16	13	13	63	44	+19	61
10	Compostela	42	17	8	17	47	54	−7	59
11	Celta Vigo	42	12	16	14	49	51	−2	52

Source: LFP
Rules for classification: 1) points; 2) head-to-head points; 3) head-to-head goal difference; 4) head-to-head goals scored; 5) goal difference; 6) number of goals scored.

==== Positions by round ====
Team ╲ Round	1	2	3	4	5	6	7	8	9	10	11	12	13	14	15	16	17	18	19	20	21	22	23	24	25	26	27	28	29	30	31	32	33	34	35	36	37	38	39	40	41	42
Deportivo La Coruña	4	11	9	8	5	7	9	12	8	9	10	10	13	10	9	10	8	8	7	7	8	9	8	7	7	9	9	10	10	10	10	10	10	10	9	9	7	6	7	7	9	9

1996–97 UEFA Cup first round

Source: LFP 1–4 5–8 9–12 13–16 17–20 21–22

==== Matches ====
2 September 1995 1	Deportivo La Coruña	3 – 0	Valencia	A Coruña, Spain
	Manjarín 30'; Bebeto 36', 59'; Canales (yellow card)	Report	(yellow card) José Ignacio; (yellow card) Otero; (yellow card) Sietes	Stadium: Estadio Riazor; Referee: Celino Gracia Redondo

10 September 1995 2	Compostela	4 – 0	Deportivo La Coruña	Santiago de Compostela, Spain
	Fabiano 20', 46'; Ramón 36'; Ohen 50'; Lekumberri (yellow card)	Report		Stadium: Estadio Multiusos de San Lázaro; Referee: José Victor Esquinas Torres

17 September 1995 3	Deportivo La Coruña	2 – 0	Salamanca	A Coruña, Spain
	Donato 35'; Fran 55'	Report	(yellow card) Barragán	Stadium: Estadio Riazor; Referee: José Manuel Andradas Asurmendi

24 September 1995 4	Tenerife	1 – 1	Deportivo La Coruña	Santa Cruz de Tenerife, Spain
	Pizzi 73' (yellow card); Felipe Miñambres (yellow card); Ramis (yellow card)	Report	88' Bebeto; (yellow card) Donato	Stadium: Heliodoro Rodríguez López; Referee: Eduardo Iturralde González

1 October 1995 5	Deportivo La Coruña	5 – 0	Albacete Balompié	A Coruña, Spain
	Bebeto 2', 83', 84', 86', 89'; Jémez (yellow card)	Report	(yellow card) Bjelica; (yellow card) Coco; (yellow card) Manolo Salvador	Stadium: Estadio Riazor; Referee: Juan Fernández Marín

4 October 1995 6	Real Sociedad	2 – 1	Deportivo La Coruña	San Sebastián, Spain
	de Pedro 39'; Pürk 53' (yellow card)	Report	38' Radchenko; (yellow card) (yellow-red card) Aldana	Stadium: Anoeta; Referee: César Barrenechea Montero

8 October 1995 7	Deportivo La Coruña	2 – 3	Racing Santander	A Coruña, Spain
	Bebeto 67'; Merino 89' (o.g.); Nando (yellow card)	Report	25' Adepoju; 51' Fayzulin; 57' Fernández; (yellow card) Alfaro; (yellow card) Iñaki Bollaín; (yellow card) Setién	Stadium: Estadio Riazor; Referee: Fernando Carmona Méndez

14 October 1995 8	Atlético Madrid	1 – 0	Deportivo La Coruña	Madrid, Spain
	Simeone 44'; Muñoz (yellow card)	Report	(yellow card) Donato; (yellow card) Ribera; (yellow card) Voro	Stadium: Vicente Calderón Stadium; Referee: Miguel Marín López

22 October 1995 9	Deportivo La Coruña	1 – 0	Sporting de Gijón	A Coruña, Spain
	Radchenko 25'; Donato (yellow card); Jémez (red card); Viqueira (yellow card); Voro (yellow card)	Report	(yellow card) Giner; (yellow card) Lediakhov	Stadium: Estadio Riazor; Referee: Carlos Megía Dávila

28 October 1995 10	Sevilla	0 – 0	Deportivo La Coruña	Seville, Spain
	Carlitos (yellow card); Jiménez (yellow card); Prieto (yellow card)	Report	(yellow card) Voro	Stadium: Ramón Sánchez Pizjuán; Referee: Juan Ansuátegui Roca

5 November 1995 11	Deportivo La Coruña	0 – 1	Espanyol	A Coruña, Spain
	Fran (yellow card)	Report	47' (yellow card) Brnović; (yellow card) Arteaga; (yellow card) Pacheta; (yellow card) Urzaiz	Stadium: Estadio Riazor; Referee: José Núñez Manrique

11 November 1995 12	Celta Vigo	0 – 0	Deportivo La Coruña	Vigo, Spain
	Alejo (yellow card); Gil (yellow card); Hoyas (yellow card)	Report	(yellow card) Alfredo Santaelena; (yellow card) Donato	Stadium: Balaídos; Referee: Antonio López Nieto

19 November 1995 13	Athletic Bilbao	1 – 0	Deportivo La Coruña	Bilbao, Spain
	Tabuenka 89'; Etxeberria (yellow card); Larrazábal (yellow card); Vales (yellow card)	Report	(yellow card) (yellow-red card) Aldana; (yellow card) Voro	Stadium: San Mamés; Referee: Arturo Daudén Ibáñez

26 November 1995 14	Deportivo La Coruña	3 – 1	Real Valladolid	A Coruña, Spain
	Antía 2' (o.g.); Bebeto 77', 88'	Report	75' Turiel	Stadium: Estadio Riazor; Referee: José Japón Sevilla

3 December 1995 15	Mérida	0 – 2	Deportivo La Coruña	Mérida, Spain
	José María (yellow card); Sinval (yellow card); Vučević (yellow card)	Report	7' Aldana; 51' Manjarín; (yellow card) Nando; (yellow card) Silva	Stadium: Estadio Romano; Referee: Carlos Megía Dávila

10 December 1995 16	Deportivo La Coruña	2 – 3	Real Zaragoza	A Coruña, Spain
	Bebeto 23' (pen.); Manjarín 82'; Alfredo Santaelena (yellow card); Đukić (yellow card)	Report	6' (yellow card) Pardeza; 19' Morientes; 72' Dani García; (red card) Belsué; (yellow card) (yellow-red card) Cuartero; (yellow card) Solana	Stadium: Estadio Riazor; Referee: Eduardo Iturralde González

17 December 1995 17	Rayo Vallecano	0 – 6	Deportivo La Coruña	Madrid, Spain
	Alcázar (yellow card) de Quintana (yellow card)	Report	15' Donato; 17' Aldana; 24' Alfredo Santaelena; 47' Bebeto; 67' Manjarín; 87' López Rekarte; (yellow card) Ribera	Stadium: Estadio Teresa Rivero; Referee: César Barrenechea Montero

21 December 1995 18	Deportivo La Coruña	3 – 0	Real Madrid	A Coruña, Spain
	Bebeto 13', 41', 43'; Nando (yellow card)	Report	(yellow card) Amavisca; (yellow card) Lasa; (yellow card) Milla	Stadium: Estadio Riazor; Referee: José Rubio Valdivieso

3 January 1996 19	Real Oviedo	0 – 2	Deportivo La Coruña	Oviedo, Spain
	Armando Álvarez (yellow card); Jerkan (yellow card); Oli (yellow card); Šćepanović (yellow card); Suárez (yellow card)	Report	75' Begiristain; 89' Fran; (yellow card) Alfredo Santaelena; (yellow card) (yellow-red card) Nando; (yellow card) Voro	Stadium: Estadio Carlos Tartiere; Referee: José Japón Sevilla

7 January 1996 20	Deportivo La Coruña	0 – 0	Real Betis	A Coruña, Spain
	Đukić (yellow card)	Report	(yellow card) Jaro; (yellow card) Josete	Stadium: Estadio Riazor; Referee: Manuel Mejuto González

14 January 1996 21	Barcelona	1 – 1	Deportivo La Coruña	Barcelona, Spain
	Abelardo Fernández 58'; Bakero (yellow card); Óscar García (yellow card)	Report	39' Radchenko; (yellow card) Donato; (yellow card) Jémez	Stadium: Camp Nou; Referee: Juan Fernández Marín

20 January 1996 22	Valencia	2 – 1	Deportivo La Coruña	Valencia, Spain
	Mijatović 66', 88' (pen.); Mazinho (yellow card); Otero (yellow card) (yellow-red card)	Report	15' (yellow card) Aldana; (yellow card) Bebeto; (yellow card) López Rekarte; (yellow card) Ribera; (yellow card) Silva	Stadium: Mestalla Stadium; Referee: José Núñez Manrique

24 January 1996 23	Deportivo La Coruña	2 – 0	Compostela	A Coruña, Spain
	Aldana 42'; Bebeto 55'; Alfredo Santaelena (yellow card); Manjarín (yellow card)	Report	(yellow card) Passi; (yellow card) Ramón; (yellow card) Tocornal	Stadium: Estadio Riazor; Referee: Juan Brito Arceo

27 January 1996 24	Salamanca	0 – 5	Deportivo La Coruña	Villares de la Reina, Spain
		Report	15', 36' Aldana; 38', 81' Bebeto; 60' Manjarín	Stadium: Helmántico Stadium; Referee: Miguel Marín López

4 February 1996 25	Deportivo La Coruña	1 – 1	Tenerife	A Coruña, Spain
	Manjarín 64'; López Rekarte (yellow card)	Report	25' Aguilera; (yellow card) Conte; (yellow card) Robaina	Stadium: Estadio Riazor; Referee: Celino Gracia Redondo

11 February 1996 26	Albacete Balompié	1 – 0	Deportivo La Coruña	Albacete, Spain
	Zalazar 32' (pen.); Coco (yellow card); Josico (yellow card); Muñoz (yellow card); Ortega (yellow card)	Report	(yellow card) Alfredo Santaelena; (yellow card) Silva	Stadium: Estadio Carlos Belmonte; Referee: José María García-Aranda

18 February 1996 27	Deportivo La Coruña	1 – 1	Real Sociedad	A Coruña, Spain
	Fernández 66'; Milovanović (yellow card); Ribera (yellow card)	Report	31' Pérez; (yellow card) Albístegui; (yellow card) Idiakez; (yellow card) Imaz; (yellow card) Karpin	Stadium: Estadio Riazor; Referee: José Rubio Valdivieso

24 February 1996 28	Racing Santander	2 – 1	Deportivo La Coruña	Santander, Spain
	Popov 32'; Merino 82'; Cervera (yellow card); Txema Alonso (yellow card)	Report	52' (pen.) Begiristain; (yellow card) Đukić; (yellow card) Voro	Stadium: El Sardinero; Referee: Manuel Díaz Vega

3 March 1996 29	Deportivo La Coruña	2 – 2	Atlético Madrid	A Coruña, Spain
	Fernández 48'; Radchenko 84' (yellow card); Alfredo Santaelena (yellow card); Donato (yellow card); Đukić (red card); Fran (yellow card); Manjarín (yellow card)	Report	40' Penev; 59' (pen.) Pantić; (yellow card) Caminero; (yellow card) Kiko; (yellow card) Vizcaíno	Stadium: Estadio Riazor; Referee: Arturo Daudén Ibáñez

10 March 1996 30	Sporting de Gijón	1 – 1	Deportivo La Coruña	Gijón, Spain
	Eloy 31'; Salinas (yellow card); Velasco (yellow card)	Report	51' López Rekarte; (yellow card) Begiristain; (yellow card) Voro	Stadium: El Molinón; Referee: José Victor Esquinas Torres

17 March 1996 31	Deportivo La Coruña	3 – 2	Sevilla	A Coruña, Spain
	Fran 30'; Jémez 37' (yellow card); Bebeto 55'	Report	40' Šuker; 87' Monchu; (yellow card) Jiménez; (yellow card) Marcos Martín; (yellow card) Prieto	Stadium: Estadio Riazor; Referee: Eduardo Iturralde González

24 March 1996 32	Espanyol	0 – 0	Deportivo La Coruña	Barcelona, Spain
	Lardín (yellow card); Pacheta (yellow card); Torres Mestre (yellow card)	Report	(yellow card) Đukić	Stadium: Sarrià Stadium; Referee: Carmelo Rodríguez Martel

27 March 1996 33	Deportivo La Coruña	2 – 1	Celta Vigo	A Coruña, Spain
	Manjarín 19'; Bebeto 83'; Fernández (yellow card)	Report	89' (yellow card) Sánchez; (yellow card) Desio; (yellow card) Ratković; (yellow card) Tárraga	Stadium: Estadio Riazor; Referee: Juan Ansuátegui Roca

31 March 1996 34	Deportivo La Coruña	0 – 0	Athletic Bilbao	A Coruña, Spain
	Alfredo Santaelena (yellow card); Voro (yellow card)	Report	(yellow card) Alkiza; (yellow card) Goikoetxea; (yellow card) Larrazábal; (yellow card) Ziganda	Stadium: Estadio Riazor; Referee: Juan Fernández Marín

7 April 1996 35	Real Valladolid	2 – 2	Deportivo La Coruña	Valladolid, Spain
	Quevedo 14' (yellow card); Peternac 30' (yellow card); Gutiérrez (yellow card); Peña (yellow card); Ramón (yellow card); Torres Gómez (red card); Vara (red card)	Report	40' (pen.), 56' (pen.) Donato; (yellow card) Fernández; (yellow card) Ribera; (yellow card) Voro	Stadium: José Zorrilla; Referee: Juan Brito Arceo

14 April 1996 36	Deportivo La Coruña	2 – 1	Mérida	A Coruña, Spain
	Bebeto 53', 67' (pen.); Fernández (yellow card)	Report	75' Sinval	Stadium: Estadio Riazor; Referee: José Japón Sevilla

21 April 1996 37	Real Zaragoza	2 – 3	Deportivo La Coruña	Zaragoza, Spain
	Morientes 44'; Aragón 57' (pen.); Aguado (yellow card); Belman (yellow card); Berti (yellow card); Pardeza (yellow card)	Report	25' (pen.) Donato; 34' Fernández; 73' Manjarín; (yellow card) Voro	Stadium: La Romareda; Referee: José Rubio Valdivieso

28 April 1996 38	Deportivo La Coruña	1 – 0	Rayo Vallecano	A Coruña, Spain
	Radchenko 89'; Donato (yellow card)	Report	(yellow card) Castillo; (yellow card) Cortijo; (yellow card) González	Stadium: Estadio Riazor; Referee: César Barrenechea Montero

5 May 1996 39	Real Madrid	1 – 0	Deportivo La Coruña	Madrid, Spain
	Enrique 61'; Raúl (yellow card); Sánchez Flores (yellow card)	Report	(yellow card) Donato; (yellow card) Voro	Stadium: Santiago Bernabéu Stadium; Referee: José Prados García

12 May 1996 40	Deportivo La Coruña	0 – 4	Real Oviedo	A Coruña, Spain
	Begiristain (yellow card); Radchenko (yellow card)	Report	14', 71' (yellow card) Carlos; 68' (yellow card) Jerkan; 84' Ania; (yellow card) Manel; (yellow card) Oli; (yellow card) Suárez	Stadium: Estadio Riazor; Referee: Carmelo Rodríguez Martel

19 May 1996 41	Real Betis	1 – 0	Deportivo La Coruña	Seville, Spain
	Stošić 31'; Alfonso Pérez (yellow card); Arpón (yellow card); Cañas (yellow card) (yellow-red card); Jarni (yellow card); Olías (yellow card)	Report	(yellow card) Alfredo Santaelena; (yellow card) Đukić; (yellow card) Jémez; (yellow card) Voro	Stadium: Benito Villamarín; Referee: Carlos Megía Dávila

26 May 1996 42	Deportivo La Coruña	2 – 2	Barcelona	A Coruña, Spain
	Bebeto 37', 57'; Donato (yellow card); Fernández (yellow card)	Report	74' Guardiola; 87' Amor; (yellow card) Roca	Stadium: Estadio Riazor; Referee: Miguel Marín López

=== Copa del Rey ===
Win Draw Loss

Round	Opponent	Aggregate	First leg			Second leg		
Round	Opponent	Aggregate	Venue	Result	Ref	Venue	Result	Ref
Round of 16	Tenerife	2–3	H	1–1		A	1–2	

=== UEFA Cup Winners' Cup ===
==== First round ====
14 September 1995 First leg	APOEL (Cyprus)	0 – 0	(Spain) Deportivo La Coruña	Nicosia, Cyprus
20:15	Ioannou (yellow card) 13'	Report	(yellow card) 69' Silva; (yellow card) 77' Fernández	Stadium: Makario Stadium; Attendance: 10,200; Referee: Marcello Nicchi (Italy)

28 September 1995 Second leg	Deportivo La Coruña (Spain)	8 – 0	(Cyprus) APOEL	A Coruña, Spain
20:00	Bebeto 17', 22', 45'; Radchenko 26', 68'; Begiristain 43'; Donato 61'; Aldana 80'	Report	(yellow card) 19' Timotheou; (yellow card) 29' Pounas; (yellow card) 82' Fasouliotis	Stadium: Estadio Riazor; Attendance: 10,650; Referee: Alfred Micallef (Malta)

Deportivo La Coruña won 8–0 on aggregate

==== Second round ====
19 October 1995 First leg	Trabzonspor (Turkey)	0 – 1	(Spain) Deportivo La Coruña	Trabzon, Turkey
20:00	Özköylü (yellow card) 59'; Temizkanoğlu (yellow card) 63'; Kafkas (yellow card) 72'	Report	61' Donato; (yellow card) 63' Radchenko	Stadium: Hüseyin Avni Aker Stadium; Attendance: 9,101; Referee: Frans van den Wijngaert (Belgium)

2 November 1995 Second leg	Deportivo La Coruña (Spain)	3 – 0	(Turkey) Trabzonspor	A Coruña, Spain
22:00	Donato 22'; Bebeto 38', 80'	Report	(yellow card) 27' Atila; (yellow card) 54' Tümkaya; (yellow card) 55' Özköylü	Stadium: Estadio Riazor; Attendance: 27,500; Referee: Gheorghe Constantin (Romania)

Deportivo La Coruña won 4–0 on aggregate

==== Quarter-finals ====
7 March 1996 First leg	Deportivo La Coruña (Spain)	1 – 0	(Spain) Real Zaragoza	A Coruña, Spain
21:30	Fernández 70'; Voro (yellow card) 16'	Report	(yellow card) 46' Sanjuán; (yellow card) 76' Aguado; (yellow card) 90' López	Stadium: Estadio Riazor; Attendance: 13,800; Referee: Gerd Grabher (Austria)

21 March 1996 Second leg	Real Zaragoza (Spain)	1 – 1	(Spain) Deportivo La Coruña	Zaragoza, Spain
21:30	Morientes 37'; Francisco Higuera (yellow card) 65'	Report	64' Bebeto; (yellow card) 72' Jémez	Stadium: La Romareda; Attendance: 31,900; Referee: Guy Goethals (Belgium)

Deportivo La Coruña won 2–1 on aggregate

==== Semi-finals ====
4 April 1996 First leg	Deportivo La Coruña (Spain)	0 – 1	(France) Paris Saint-Germain	A Coruña, Spain
21:00	Manjarín (yellow card) 61'; Fernández (yellow card) 65'	Report	90' Djorkaeff; (yellow card) 25' Le Guen; (yellow card) 29' Bravo	Stadium: Estadio Riazor; Attendance: 21,100; Referee: Markus Merk (Germany)

18 April 1996 Second leg	Paris Saint-Germain (France)	1 – 0	(Spain) Deportivo La Coruña	Paris, France
21:00	Loko 58'; Roche (yellow card) 68'	Report	(yellow card) 39' Santaelena; (yellow card) 55' Aldana	Stadium: Parc des Princes; Attendance: 41,508; Referee: Alfredo Trentalange (Italy)

Paris Saint-Germain won 2–0 on aggregate

=== Supercopa de España ===
Win Draw Loss

Round	Opponent	Aggregate	First leg			Second leg		
Round	Opponent	Aggregate	Venue	Result	Ref	Venue	Result	Ref
Final	Real Madrid	5–1	H	3–0		A	2–1	
