= Alberto Albístegui =

Spanish footballer (born 1964)

Personal information
- Full name: Alberto Albístegui Zamacola
- Date of birth: 24 September 1964 (age 62)
- Place of birth: Eibar, Spain
- Height: 1.84 m (6 ft 1/2 in)
- Positions: Centre back; libero; midfielder

Youth career
- –1982: Real Sociedad

Senior career*
Years	Team	Apps	(Gls)
1982–1986	San Sebastián	114	(4)
1984–1986	Real Sociedad	2	(0)
1986–1988	Sestao Sport	77	(6)
1988–1990	Mallorca	25	(1)
1990–1993	Deportivo La Coruña	91	(6)
1993–1997	Real Sociedad	113	(6)
1997–1999	Deportivo Alavés	38	(0)
Total		460	(23)
- * Club domestic league appearances and goals

Alberto Albístegui Zamacola (born 24 September 1964) is a Spanish retired footballer who could play as a centre back, libero or midfielder. His career was most associated with Real Sociedad, for whom he played 115 La Liga matches in six and a half seasons across two spells, scoring six goals. Zamacola also earned promotion to the top flight on three occasions: with Mallorca in 1988–89, Deportivo La Coruña in 1990–91, and Deportivo Alavés in 1997–98. He made a further 84 first division appearances in a combined four seasons with these three clubs, during which he scored three goals.

== Career ==
Albístegui was born in Eibar, in the province of Gipuzkoa in the Basque Country. He began his career in the youth teams of Basque club Real Sociedad, and made his debut for their B team, San Sebastián, in 1982. An AFE strike in September 1984 allowed Albístegui, two weeks shy of his 20th birthday, to make his La Liga debut for Sociedad in a home fixture against Málaga at Atotxa Stadium. The hosts lost 1–0, and Albístegui was substituted immediately after the visitors scored. He continued to play predominantly for the reserves, and made only one further first team appearance, in a 6–0 win over Hércules the following season.

With no prospect of a regular first team spot at Real Sociedad, Albístegui joined Segunda División side Sestao Sport in the summer of 1986. He was a favourite with coach Javier Irureta, and played 77 matches in two seasons at the club. He signed for Mallorca ahead of the 1988–89 Segunda División season, and made 17 appearances as Mallorca earned promotion to the top flight after a promotion playoff victory over Español. He remained in the squad for the following season, but was mostly not used by coach Lorenzo Serra Ferrer. He played only eight matches that year, although one of those was a substitute appearance in a famous 1–0 win over Barcelona on 1 October.

Albístegui returned to the second tier with Deportivo La Coruña, and once again achieved promotion in his first season. He played 34 matches, with highlights including scoring both goals in a 2–1 home win over Figueres at Estadio Riazor on 17 March, and playing the full 90 minutes of the 2–0 home win over direct rivals Real Murcia that sealed promotion on the last day of the season. He again played an important part in the 1991–92 campaign, making 24 appearances, scoring a crucial brace in a 2–2 draw with a Toni Polster-inspired Logroñés, and helping Depor retain their La Liga status in a relegation playoff victory of Real Betis, in which he scored a penalty in the first leg.

In his first two seasons with Depor, Albístegui had operated as a libero or midfielder, but the signing of Brazilian defensive midfielder Mauro Silva from Bragantino in the summer of 1992 saw him convert to an orthodox centre back role. Silva and fellow Brazilian Bebeto, who joined from Vasco da Gama, were key signings that heralded the birth of Súper Dépor, as the club emerged as surprise championship challengers in 1992–93. Albístegui was part of a defensive line alongside José Luis Ribera (who had made his La Liga in the same match as Albístegui back in 1984), Yugoslavian Miroslav Đukić, Luis López Rekarte and Nando which helped goalkeeper Francisco Liaño become the first Deportivo winner of the Ricardo Zamora Trophy in almost forty years. Meanwhile, Bebeto won the Pichichi Trophy, the first Depor player ever to do so, and Albístegui's former Mallorca teammate Claudio Barragán also contributed plenty of goals, and the club ultimately finished in third place.

Albístegui again contributed an important goal, scoring in a 1–0 win over Sporting de Gijón at El Molinón in April. However, his disciplinary record was poor, as he was booked nine times, and sent off in a 2–1 loss to Real Madrid at Santiago Bernabéu Stadium on 27 February. This may have contributed to Deportivo's decision to sign Voro from Valencia and Paco Jémez from Rayo Vallecano, and allow Albístegui to leave that summer. He returned to his roots by rejoining Real Sociedad, coinciding with their move from the old Atotxa Stadium to the new Anoeta.

Albístegui played 30 matches in his first season back at the club, but a serious injury kept him out for half of the 1994–95 campaign. He was a regular in the starting eleven for the following two years, but the arrival of German coach Bernd Krauss ahead of the 1997–98 campaign saw a change of fortunes, and he didn't feature at all in the first part of that season. He dropped back to the Segunda División in November, signing with Deportivo Alavés, In his first season with Alavés, he secured promotion to the top flight for the third time in his career, secured with an emphatic 3–0 home win over Rayo Vallecano at Mendizorrotza, and also helped eliminate his former club Deportivo La Coruña in the quarterfinals of the Copa del Rey.

1998–99 was to be Albístegui's last, and fittingly his last appearance came on the final day of the season against Real Sociedad. Alavés marked the occasion with a 2–1 win, which secured their La Liga status for another season. Albístegui retired at the age of almost 35 after 199 top flight appearances, and nine goals, over the course of his seventeen year career.

== Retirement ==
After his retirement, Albístegui ran several businesses in his hometown of Eibar. At the 2015 Spanish local elections, he was an Eibar municipal council candidate for the Socialist Party of the Basque Country–Basque Country Left. He was elected, and held several posts in the municipal government between 2015 and 2019.

== Personal life ==
Albístegui's father, also called Alberto, was also a footballer, representing both Real Sociedad and Osasuna in La Liga in the 1950s. Alberto Sr. died in 2015. Alberto Jr.'s brother Germán, older by four years, was a goalkeeper who briefly represented Eibar in the mid-1980s. Germán ran unsuccessfully for the presidency of SD Eibar in 2017. Germán's son Alex is also a professional footballer, having represented a number of clubs, including one Segunda División appearance for Real Sociedad. Since 2019, he plays for Burgos in Segunda División B.

== Honours ==
Deportivo La Coruña

- Segunda División runners-up: 1990–91

Deportivo Alavés

- Segunda División: 1997–98

== Career statistics ==
As of 4 May 2021

Club	Season	League			Cup		Other		Total	
Club	Season	Division	Apps	Goals	Apps	Goals	Apps	Goals	Apps	Goals
San Sebastián	1982–83	Segunda División B	16	0	–		0	0	16	0
San Sebastián	1983–84	Segunda División B	35	1	–		0	0	35	1
San Sebastián	1984–85	Segunda División B	36	2	–		0	0	36	2
San Sebastián	1985–86	Segunda División B	27	1	–		0	0	27	1
San Sebastián	Total		114	4	0	0	0	0	114	4
Real Sociedad	1984–85	La Liga	1	0	0	0	0	0	1	0
Real Sociedad	1985–86	La Liga	1	0	0	0	0	0	1	0
Real Sociedad	Total		2	0	0	0	0	0	2	0
Sestao Sport	1986–87	Segunda División	40	3	2	1	–		42	4
Sestao Sport	1987–88	Segunda División	37	3	4	0	–		41	3
Sestao Sport	Total		77	6	6	1	0	0	83	7
Mallorca	1988–89	Segunda División	17	1	0	0	0	0	17	1
Mallorca	1989–90	La Liga	8	0	0	0	–		8	0
Mallorca	Total		25	1	0	0	0	0	25	1
Deportivo La Coruña	1990–91	Segunda División	34	3	8	1	–		42	4
Deportivo La Coruña	1991–92	La Liga	24	2	9	1	2	1	35	4
Deportivo La Coruña	1992–93	La Liga	33	1	4	0	–		37	1
Deportivo La Coruña	Total		91	6	21	2	2	1	114	9
Real Sociedad	1993–94	La Liga	30	1	5	0	–		35	1
Real Sociedad	1994–95	La Liga	19	1	3	0	–		22	1
Real Sociedad	1995–96	La Liga	29	3	1	0	–		30	3
Real Sociedad	1996–97	La Liga	35	1	1	0	–		36	1
Real Sociedad	1997–98	La Liga	0	0	1	0	–		1	0
Real Sociedad	Total		113	6	11	0	0	0	124	6
Real Sociedad total			115	6	11	0	0	0	126	6
Deportivo Alavés	1997–98	Segunda División	19	0	4	0	–		23	0
Deportivo Alavés	1998–99	La Liga	19	0	0	0	–		19	0
Deportivo Alavés	Total		38	0	4	0	0	0	42	0
Career total			460	23	42	3	2	1	504	27

1. Appearances in the 1991–92 La Liga relegation playoff
