= 1994 UEFA European Under-21 Championship qualification =

Football tournament qualification stage

The 1994 UEFA European Under-21 Championship qualification began in 1992 and finished in early 1994. The final tournament was held in March and April 1994 in France.

The 32 national teams were divided into six groups (four groups of 5 + two groups of 6). The group winners and the two best runners-up played off against each other on a two-legged home-and-away basis to determine the final four, one of whom would host the last four matches.

The team from Serbia and Montenegro, then known as the Federal Republic of Yugoslavia (founded in April 1992) were excluded from the tournament for political reasons. They had been drawn in group five. In the first competition since the dissolution of the Soviet Union, Russia competed. Wales also competed for the first time.

Albeit had been dissolved in 1992, Czechoslovakia still competed for this time.

== Qualifying group stage ==
=== Draw ===
The allocation of teams into qualifying groups was based on that of 1994 FIFA World Cup qualification with several changes, reflecting the absence of some nations:

- Group 1 did not include Estonia
- Groups 2 and 6 featured the same nations
- Group 3 did not include Northern Ireland, Lithuania and Latvia, but included Germany (who did not participate in World Cup qualification)
- Group 4 did not include Faroe Islands
- Group 5 featured the same nations. As in the World Cup qualifiers, Yugoslavia was excluded from the group after the draw

=== Group 1 ===
Team	Pld	W	D	L	GF	GA	GD	Pts
Italy	8	7	0	1	16	6	+10	21
Portugal	8	5	2	1	18	4	+14	17
Switzerland	8	3	2	3	11	8	+3	11
Scotland	8	2	2	4	8	11	−3	8
Malta	8	0	0	8	1	25	−24	0

8 September 1992

Switzerland	2–0	Scotland

13 October 1992

Scotland	0–0	Portugal
	(Report)

McDiarmid Park, Perth
Referee: Finn Lambek (Denmark)

15 October 1992

Italy	1–0	Switzerland

17 November 1992

Switzerland	1–0	Malta

18 November 1992

Scotland	1–2	Italy

16 December 1992

Malta	0–1	Italy

23 January 1993

Malta	0–2	Portugal
	(Report)	Bruno 57', 83'

Hibernians Ground, Paola
Referee: Andreas Georghiou (Cyprus)

16 February 1993

Scotland	3–0	Malta

23 February 1993

Portugal	2–0	Italy
J. Costa 55'; Toni 62'	(Report)

Estádio Primeiro de Maio, Braga
Referee: Roger Philippi (Luxembourg)

25 March 1993

Italy	3–0	Malta

30 March 1993

Switzerland	1–1	Portugal
	(Report)	Bruno 18'

Stade Municipal, Yverdon-les-Bains
Referee: Atanas Ouzounov (Bulgaria)

16 April 1993

Malta	1–4	Switzerland

27 April 1993

Portugal	2–1	Scotland
Gil 8'; Bruno 78'	(Report)

Estádio Municipal Dr. Alves Vieira, Torres Novas
Referee: Markus Merk (Germany)

25 March 1993

Switzerland	0–2	Italy

18 June 1993

Portugal	7–0	Malta
Toni 13', 76', 91'; Torres 20'; Bruno 51', 61', 75'	(Report)

Estádio Primeiro de Maio, Braga
Referee: Frank Mcdonald (Northern Ireland)

18 June 1993

Portugal	3–0	Switzerland
Toni 3', 45'; Torres 27'	(Report)

Estádio Professor Doutor José Vieira de Carvalho, Maia
Referee: Keith Cooper (Wales)

7 September 1993

Scotland	0–0	Switzerland

13 October 1993

Italy	5–2	Scotland

16 November 1993

Malta	0–1	Scotland

18 November 1993

Italy	2–1	Portugal
	(Report)	Toni 33'

Stadio Silvio Appiani, Padua
Referee: Werner Kasimir (Germany)

=== Group 2 ===
Qualifying Group 2		P	W	D	L	F	A	Pts
1	Poland	10	7	0	3	26	10	21
2	Turkey	10	6	2	2	15	10	20
3	Norway	10	6	1	3	20	13	19
4	England	10	4	3	3	20	8	15
5	Netherlands	10	3	2	5	11	14	11
6	San Marino	10	0	0	10	3	40	0

- Norway 3–2 San Marino
- Poland 3–0 Turkey
- Norway 1–0 Netherlands
- San Marino 0–3 Norway
- England 0–2 Norway
- Netherlands 1–3 Poland
- Turkey 4–0 San Marino
- England 0–1 Turkey
- Turkey 1–1 Netherlands
- England 6–0 San Marino
- Netherlands 0–1 Turkey
- San Marino 0–2 Turkey
- Netherlands 3–0 San Marino
- Turkey 0–0 England
- Poland 7–0 San Marino
- Norway 5–2 Turkey
- England 3–0 Netherlands
- San Marino 0–5 Poland
- Poland 1–4 England
- Norway 1–1 England
- Netherlands 2–1 Norway
- England 1–2 Poland
- Norway 3–1 Poland
- San Marino 1–3 Netherlands
- Poland 2–0 Norway
- Netherlands 1–1 England
- Turkey 1–0 Poland
- Turkey 3–1 Norway
- Poland 2–0 Netherlands
- San Marino 0–4 England

Poland qualify as group winners

=== Group 3 ===
Qualifying Group 3		P	W	D	L	F	A	Pts
1	Spain	8	7	1	0	15	4	22
2	Germany	8	5	0	3	20	8	15
3	Denmark	8	4	0	4	12	9	12
4	Albania	8	1	2	5	5	18	5
5	Republic of Ireland	8	1	1	6	7	20	4

- Spain 1–1 Albania
- Ireland 3–1 Albania
- Denmark 3–2 Ireland
- Albania 0–1 Germany
- Spain 2–1 Ireland
- Germany 1–2 Spain
- Germany 4–1 Albania
- Ireland 0–1 Germany
- Germany 8–0 Ireland
- Denmark 0–1 Spain
- Denmark 1–4 Germany
- Ireland 0–2 Denmark
- Albania 1–1 Ireland
- Denmark 5–0 Albania
- Albania 1–0 Denmark
- Albania 0–3 Spain
- Germany 0–1 Denmark
- Ireland 0–2 Spain
- Spain 1–0 Denmark
- Spain 3–1 Germany

Spain qualify as group winners

=== Group 4 ===
Qualifying Group 4		P	W	D	L	F	A	Pts
1	Czechoslovakia	8	6	1	1	16	4	19
2	Romania	8	5	0	3	13	10	15
3	Belgium	8	4	1	3	9	7	13
4	Wales	8	3	2	3	16	16	11
5	Cyprus	8	0	0	8	4	21	0

- Belgium 3–0 Cyprus
- Romania 2–3 Wales
- Czechoslovakia 1–0 Belgium
- Cyprus 2–4 Wales
- Belgium 1–0 Romania
- Romania 1–0 Czechoslovakia
- Belgium 3–1 Wales
- Cyprus 0–2 Romania
- Cyprus 0–1 Belgium
- Cyprus 0–2 Czechoslovakia
- Wales 0–0 Belgium
- Romania 1–0 Cyprus
- Czechoslovakia 1–1 Wales
- Czechoslovakia 4–2 Romania
- Wales 0–4 Czechoslovakia
- Romania 3–1 Belgium
- Wales 6–2 Cyprus
- Czechoslovakia 2–0 Cyprus
- Wales 1–2 Romania
- Belgium 0–2 Czechoslovakia

Czechoslovakia qualify as group winners

=== Group 5 ===
FR Yugoslavia was excluded due to Yugoslav war.

Qualifying Group 5		P	W	D	L	F	A	Pts
1	Russia	8	6	2	0	25	4	20
2	Greece	8	6	2	0	23	6	20
3	Iceland	8	3	0	5	11	17	9
4	Hungary	8	2	1	5	8	16	7
5	Luxembourg	8	0	1	7	2	26	1

- Greece 3–0 Iceland
- Hungary 3–2 Iceland
- Luxembourg 0–0 Hungary
- Iceland 1–3 Greece
- Russia 5–0 Iceland
- Russia 2–1 Luxembourg
- Greece 2–1 Hungary
- Greece 6–0 Luxembourg
- Hungary 1–2 Greece
- Luxembourg 0–6 Russia
- Russia 2–0 Hungary
- Luxembourg 1–3 Iceland
- Russia 1–1 Greece
- Iceland 0–1 Russia
- Iceland 2–1 Hungary
- Hungary 0–6 Russia
- Iceland 3–0 Luxembourg
- Luxembourg 0–4 Greece
- Hungary 2–0 Luxembourg
- Greece 2–2 Russia

Russia qualify as group winners
Greece qualify as a "best runner-up"

=== Group 6 ===
Qualifying Group 6		P	W	D	L	F	A	Pts
1	France	10	8	1	1	20	6	25
2	Sweden	10	4	4	2	21	8	16
3	Finland	10	4	2	4	10	13	14
4	Bulgaria	10	4	2	4	9	13	14
5	Israel	10	3	1	6	17	16	10
6	Austria	10	1	2	7	8	29	5

- Finland 0–0 Bulgaria
- Finland 1–0 Sweden
- Bulgaria 0–1 France
- Sweden 6–0 Bulgaria
- France 6–1 Austria
- Austria 1–5 Israel
- Israel 1–1 Sweden
- France 1–2 Finland
- Israel 1–2 Bulgaria
- Israel 1–2 France
- Austria 0–1 France
- Austria 2–0 Bulgaria
- Bulgaria 3–1 Finland
- France 2–1 Sweden
- Bulgaria 1–0 Israel
- Finland 2–0 Austria
- Sweden 1–1 Austria
- Sweden 4–1 Israel
- Finland 1–0 Israel
- Sweden 1–1 France
- Austria 2–2 Finland
- Finland 0–1 France
- Bulgaria 0–0 Sweden
- Bulgaria 3–0 Austria
- Sweden 4–0 Finland
- France 3–0 Israel
- Israel 6–0 Austria
- Israel 2–1 Finland
- Austria 1–3 Sweden
- France 2–0 Bulgaria

France qualify as group winners

=== Ranking of second-placed teams ===
Because groups contained different number or teams (six and five), matches against the fifth- and sixth-placed teams in each group are not included in the ranking. As a result, six matches played by each team counted for the purposes of the second-placed table. The top seven advanced to the play-off.

Grp	Team	Pld	W	D	L	GF	GA	GD	Pts
5	Greece	6	4	2	0	13	6	+7	14
1	Portugal	6	3	2	1	14	4	+10	11
2	Turkey	6	3	1	2	7	9	−2	10
3	Germany	6	3	0	3	11	8	+3	9
4	Romania	6	3	0	3	10	10	0	9
6	Sweden	6	2	2	2	12	4	+8	8

== See also ==
- 1994 UEFA European Under-21 Championship
