= Alex Albistegi =

Spanish footballer

Personal information
- Full name: Alexander Albistegi Revilla
- Date of birth: 1 July 1987 (age 39)
- Place of birth: Eibar, Spain
- Height: 1.87 m (6 ft 1 1/2 in)
- Position: Midfielder

Team information
- Current team: Athletic Bilbao (assistant)

Youth career
- Eibar

Senior career*
Years	Team	Apps	(Gls)
2004–2007	Eibar B		
2007	Eibar	1	(0)
2007–2010	Real Sociedad B	39	(9)
2010–2011	Real Sociedad	1	(0)
2010–2011	→ Eibar (loan)	35	(4)
2011–2012	Logroñés	27	(0)
2012–2013	Real Unión	36	(2)
2013–2014	Toledo	38	(7)
2014–2016	Lleida Esportiu	70	(7)
2016–2017	Reus	13	(0)
2017	Mirandés	10	(0)
2018–2019	Lleida Esportiu	50	(1)
2019–2020	Burgos	8	(0)
2020	→ Unionistas (loan)	5	(1)
2020	Burgos Promesas	7	(0)
2021	Sestao	9	(0)
Total		349	(31)

Managerial career
- 2022–2026: Burgos B
- 2026–: Athletic Bilbao
- * Club domestic league appearances and goals

Alexander "Alex" Albistegi Revilla (born 1 July 1987) is a Spanish former professional footballer who played as a central midfielder. He is the current assistant manager of Athletic Bilbao.

He all but spent his 17-year senior career in the Segunda División B, in service of nine clubs. His Segunda División input consisted of 14 matches, one with Real Sociedad and 13 with Reus.

== Club career ==
=== Real Sociedad ===
Born in Eibar, Gipuzkoa, Basque Country, Albistegi finished his youth career with local SD Eibar, making his senior debut with their reserves in the 2004–05 season, in the Tercera División. After appearing with the first team in the Segunda División B he joined Real Sociedad in 2007, being initially assigned to the B side also of the third division.

On 19 June 2010, Albistegi made his professional debut with the Txuri-urdin, playing the last 24 minutes of a 4–1 Segunda División away loss against Elche CF. He returned to the third tier only two months later, signing on loan with former club Eibar.

=== Later career ===
Albistegi terminated his contract with Real Sociedad in August 2011, joining UD Logroñés the same month. He continued to compete in division three the following years, representing Real Unión, CD Toledo and Lleida Esportiu.

On 14 July 2016, Albistegi signed for CF Reus Deportiu, newly-promoted to the second division. The following 28 June, he agreed to a two-year contract with CD Mirandés one level below.

Albistegi remained in the third and fourth tiers until his retirement at the age of 34, with spells at Lleida, Burgos CF, Unionistas de Salamanca CF, Burgos CF Promesas and Sestao River Club. In October 2022, he was named manager at the fourth of those clubs.

== Personal life ==
Three of Albistegi's family members were also professional footballers: his grandfather Alberto featured in the top flight for Real Sociedad and CA Osasuna, his father Germán had links to Eibar and his paternal uncle, also named Alberto, played for Sociedad and Deportivo Alavés among others.

== Honours ==
Eibar

- Segunda División B: 2006–07

Real Sociedad B

- Tercera División: 2009–10

Real Sociedad

- Segunda División: 2009–10
