= 1994 UEFA European Under-21 Championship =

Tournament details
- Host country: France
- Dates: 9 March – 20 April
- Teams: 8 (from 1 confederation)
- Venue: 2 (in 2 host cities)

Final positions
- Champions: Italy (2nd title)
- Runners-up: Portugal
- Third place: Spain
- Fourth place: France

Tournament statistics
- Matches played: 12
- Goals scored: 25 (2.08 per match)
- Attendance: 94,670 (7,889 per match)
- Top scorer: (Portugal) João Pinto (3 goals)
- Best player: (Portugal) Luís Figo

The 1994 UEFA European Under-21 Championship was the ninth UEFA European Under-21 Championship. The final tournament was hosted in France between 15 and 20 April 1994.

The qualification stage spanned two years from 1992 to 1994. The qualification process consisted of 32 entrants. After the two-legged quarter-final stage, France was chosen as the first hosts of the final stage, which consisted of four matches in total. The finals included for the first time a third-place play-off.

Italy won the competition for the second consecutive time. Luís Figo won the UEFA European Under-21 Championship Golden player award.

== Qualification ==
The draw for the 1994 UEFA European Under-21 Championship qualifying round saw Czechoslovakia, France, Italy, Poland, Russia and Spain win their respective groups. Greece and Portugal qualified for the tournament as the two best runners-up. France, Italy, Portugal and Spain qualified for the 1996 Summer Olympics in the United States.

This was the last performance of Czechoslovakia, as the nation actually have split.

=== List of qualified teams ===
Country	Qualified as	Previous appearances in tournament^{1} ^{2}
Italy	Group 1 winner	8 (1978, 1980, 1982, 1984, 1986, 1988, 1990, **1992**)
Poland	Group 2 winner	4 (1982, 1984, 1986, 1992)
Spain	Group 3 winner	5 (1982, 1984, **1986**, 1988, 1990)
Czechoslovakia	Group 4 winner	5 (1978, 1980, 1988, 1990, 1992)
Russia	Group 5 winner	0 (debut)
France	Group 6 winner	4 (1982, 1984, 1986, **1988**)
Greece	Best runner-up	1 (1988)
Portugal	Second best runner-up	0 (debut)

^{1} Bold indicates champion for that year

== Squads ==
Only players born on or after 1 January 1971 were eligible to play in the tournament.

== Results ==
=== Quarter-finals ===
The first legs were played on 9 March, and the second legs were played on 23 March 1994.

Team 1	Agg.	Team 2	1st leg	2nd leg
France	3–0	Russia	2–0	1–0
Italy	3–1	Czechoslovakia	3–0	0–1
Poland	1–5	Portugal	1–3	0–2
Spain	4–2	Greece	0–0	4–2

==== First leg ====
8 March 1994

France	2–0	Russia
Llacer 23'; Ouédec 82'	Report

La Mosson, Montpellier
Attendance: 11,670
Referee: Jorge Coroado (Portugal)

9 March 1994

Italy	3–0	Czechoslovakia
Vieri 7'; Panucci 9'; Negro 79'	Report

Stadio Arechi, Salerno
Attendance: 10,000
Referee: László Vágner (Hungary)

9 March 1994

Poland	1–3	Portugal
Dąbrowski 40'	Report	J. Pinto 70', 79'; Rui Costa 85'

Stadion Miejski, Szczecin
Attendance: 7,355
Referee: Rémi Harrel (France)

9 March 1994

Spain	0–0	Greece
	Report

Estadio Municipal Juan Rojas, Almería
Attendance: 14,000
Referee: Keith Burge (Wales)

==== Second leg ====
23 March 1994

Russia	0–1	France
	Report	Dugarry 31'

Torpedo Stadium, Moscow
Attendance: 1,100
Referee: Rune Pedersen (Norway)

23 March 1994

Czechoslovakia	1–0	Italy
Svoboda 89'	Report

Stadion Střelecký ostrov, České Budějovice
Attendance: 3,800
Referee: Manuel Díaz Vega (Spain)

23 March 1994

Portugal	2–0	Poland
Toni 50'; Torres 90'	Report

Estádio Municipal de Coimbra, Coimbra
Attendance: 15,600
Referee: Markus Merk (Germany)

23 March 1994

Greece	2–4	Spain
Georgatos 7'; Prieto 85' (o.g.)	Report	Christiansen 46', 51'; Guerrero 68'; Gálvez 79'

Nikos Goumas Stadium, Athens
Attendance: 4,593
Referee: Graziano Cesari (Italy)

=== Semi-finals ===
15 April 1994

France	0–0 (a.e.t.)	Italy
	Report
Penalties
Carotti (penalty scored); Ouédec (penalty scored); Makélélé (penalty missed); Zidane (penalty scored)	3–5	(penalty scored) Panucci; (penalty scored) Vieri; (penalty scored) Berretta; (penalty scored) Marcolin; (penalty scored) Carbone

Stade des Costières, Nîmes, France
Attendance: 12,000
Referee: Keith Burge (Wales)

15 April 1994

Portugal	2–0	Spain
Rui Costa 48'; João Pinto 82'	Report

Stade de la Mosson, Montpellier, France
Attendance: 3,000
Referee: Hans-Jürgen Weber (Germany)

=== Third-place play-off ===
20 April 1994

France	1–2	Spain
Nouma 45'	Report	Óscar 53', 75'

Stade des Costières, Nîmes, France
Attendance: 5,289
Referee: Ahmet Çakar (Turkey)

=== Final ===
20 April 1994

Italy	1–0 (a.e.t.)	Portugal
Orlandini 97'	Report

Stade de la Mosson, Montpellier, France
Attendance: 6,263
Referee: Serge Muhmenthaler (Switzerland)

== Goalscorers ==
3 goals

- (Portugal) João Vieira Pinto

2 goals

- (Portugal) Rui Costa
- (Spain) Óscar
- (Spain) Thomas Christiansen

1 goal

- (Czechoslovakia) Zdeněk Svoboda
- (France) Christophe Dugarry
- (France) Francis Llacer
- (France) Nicolas Ouédec
- (France) Pascal Nouma
- (Greece) Grigoris Georgatos
- (Italy) Christian Panucci
- (Italy) Christian Vieri
- (Italy) Paolo Negro
- (Italy) Pierluigi Orlandini
- (Poland) Roman Dąbrowski
- (Portugal) Paulo Torres
- (Portugal) Nélson Gama
- (Portugal) João Oliveira Pinto
- (Spain) José Gálvez
- (Spain) Julen Guerrero

Own goal

- (Spain) José Miguel Prieto (playing against Greece)

== Final ranking ==
Rank	Team	Pld	W	D	L	GF	GA	GD	Pts
1	Italy	4	2	1	1	4	1	+3	7
2	Portugal	4	3	0	1	7	1	+6	9
3	Spain	4	2	1	1	6	5	+1	7
4	France	4	2	1	1	4	2	+2	7
5	Greece	2	1	1	0	2	4	−2	4
6	Czechoslovakia	2	1	0	1	1	3	−3	3
7	Poland	2	0	0	2	1	5	−4	0
8	Russia	2	0	0	2	0	3	−3	0
