= Josu Anuzita =

Spanish footballer and manager

Personal information
- Full name: Josu Anuzita Alegría
- Date of birth: 13 January 1964 (age 62)
- Place of birth: Getxo, Spain
- Height: 1.79 m (5 ft 10 in)
- Position: Goalkeeper

Team information
- Current team: Eibar (goalkeeper coach)

Youth career
- –1984: Arenas Club

Senior career*
Years	Team	Apps	(Gls)
1984–1990	Sestao Sport	82	(0)
1990–1993	Deportivo La Coruña	50	(0)
1993–1994	Cádiz	29	(0)
1994–1995	Atlético Marbella	29	(0)
1995–1996	Salamanca	2	(0)
1996–1997	Málaga	31	(0)
1998–2001	Barakaldo	26	(0)
Total		249	(0)

Managerial career
- 2007–2008: Arenas Club
- 2015–: Eibar (goalkeeper)
- * Club domestic league appearances and goals

Josu Anuzita Alegría (born 13 January 1964), sometimes known simply as Josu or Yosu, is a Spanish professional football coach and former player who is the goalkeeper coach of Spanish club Eibar. As a player, he was a goalkeeper.

== Playing career ==
Josu began his career with local club Arenas Club, and was named the best goalkeeper at the 1984 Trofeo La Galleta de Urduliz. This earned him a move to Segunda División B side Sestao Sport, and played three matches as they earned promotion at the end of the 1984–85 season. By 1987, he was Sestao's first choice keeper, a position he held until 1990, when he joined fellow Segunda División side Deportivo La Coruña. He played in every match bar one as Depor finished the 1990–91 season as runners-up, earning promotion to La Liga. Francisco Liaño, who had replaced Josu at Sestao, joined Deportivo in the summer of 1991, and Josu fell behind both Liaño and Juan Canales, who signed from Logroñés, in the pecking order.

Josu made his top flight debut on 2 February 1992 in a home fixture against Valencia at Estadio Riazor. He replaced the injured Liaño after 28 minutes, and conceded the only goal of the game to Fernando Giner three minutes later. However, the predominance of Liaño meant that Josu made only 13 appearances in two La Liga campaigns before leaving the club in 1993. He spent the following season as first choice at Segunda División side Cádiz, who suffered a second consecutive relegation, and 1994–95 with fellow second tier team Atlético Marbella.

Josu returned to La Liga with Salamanca ahead of the 1995–96 campaign, but played only two matches, with Iñaki Aizpurua preferred as first choice keeper. Josu then dropped into the third tier with Málaga, playing 31 times in his sole season with the club. He rounded out his career with three seasons at Barakaldo in Segunda División B, amassing 26 appearances, before retiring in 2001 at the age of 37.

== Coaching career ==
Following his retirement, Josu returned to his hometown and first club, Arenas Club, becoming their manager for the 2007–08 Tercera División campaign, which they finished in 12th place. He later spent some time working at Lezama, the training ground of Athletic Bilbao, and since 2015 has been the goalkeeping coach at Eibar.

== Honours ==
Sestao Sport

- Segunda División B: 1984–85
- Copa de la Liga Segunda División B: 1985

Deportivo La Coruña

- Segunda División runners-up: 1990–91

== Career statistics ==
=== Club ===
As of 3 May 2021

Club	Season	League			Cup		Other		Total	
Club	Season	Division	Apps	Goals	Apps	Goals	Apps	Goals	Apps	Goals
Sestao Sport	1984–85	Segunda División B	3	0	0	0	0	0	3	0
Sestao Sport	1985–86	Segunda División	0	0	0	0	0	0	0	0
Sestao Sport	1986–87	Segunda División	0	0	0	0	–		0	0
Sestao Sport	1987–88	Segunda División	21	0	2	0	–		23	0
Sestao Sport	1988–89	Segunda División	35	0	7	0	–		42	0
Sestao Sport	1989–90	Segunda División	23	0	3	0	–		26	0
Sestao Sport	Total		82	0	12	0	0	0	94	0
Deportivo La Coruña	1990–91	Segunda División	37	0	0	0	–		37	0
Deportivo La Coruña	1991–92	La Liga	12	0	3	0	–		15	0
Deportivo La Coruña	1992–93	La Liga	1	0	4	0	–		5	0
Deportivo La Coruña	Total		50	0	7	0	0	0	57	0
Cádiz	1993–94	Segunda División	29	0	1	0	–		30	0
Atlético Marbella	1994–95	Segunda División	29	0	1	0	–		30	0
Salamanca	1995–96	La Liga	2	0	4	0	–		6	0
Málaga	1996–97	Segunda División B	31	0	3	0	–		34	0
Barakaldo	1998–99	Segunda División B	12	0	0	0	6	0	18	0
Barakaldo	1999–2000	Segunda División B	8	0	4	0	6	0	18	0
Barakaldo	2000–01	Segunda División B	6	0	2	0	–		8	0
Barakaldo	Total		26	0	6	0	12	0	44	0
Career total			249	0	34	0	12	0	295	0

1. Appearances in the 1999 Segunda División B play-offs
2. Appearances in the 2000 Segunda División B play-offs
