= João Oliveira Pinto =

Portuguese footballer (1971–2024)

Personal information
- Full name: João Manuel de Oliveira Pinto
- Date of birth: 3 August 1971
- Place of birth: Lisbon, Portugal
- Date of death: 8 February 2024 (aged 52)
- Place of death: Portugal
- Height: 1.68 m (5 ft 6 in)
- Position: Attacking midfielder

Youth career
- 1984–1990: Sporting CP

Senior career*
Years	Team	Apps	(Gls)
1990–1992	Sporting CP	0	(0)
1991–1992	→ Atlético (loan)	31	(6)
1992–1993	Vitória Guimarães	13	(0)
1993–1994	Estoril	30	(1)
1994–1996	Gil Vicente	33	(0)
1996–1998	Braga	29	(1)
1998–1999	Farense	29	(2)
1999–2001	Marítimo	21	(2)
2001–2002	Académica	14	(0)
2002–2003	Imortal	33	(1)
2003–2004	Amora	29	(2)
2004–2008	Sesimbra		
2008–2010	Alfarim		

International career
1990–1991	Portugal U20	9	(1)
1991–1994	Portugal U21	12	(4)
Medal record
Men's football
Representing Portugal
FIFA U-20 World Cup
Winner	1991 Portugal
UEFA European Under-21 Championship
Runner-up	1994 France
UEFA European Under-17 Championship
Runner-up	1988 Spain
- * Club domestic league appearances and goals

João Manuel de Oliveira Pinto (3 August 1971 – 8 February 2024) was a Portuguese professional footballer who played as an attacking midfielder.

== Club career ==
Pinto was born in Lisbon. Having been brought up at Sporting CP, where he however never appeared for the first team, he achieved Primeira Liga totals of 155 games and six goals over nine seasons, with Vitória de Guimarães, G.D. Estoril Praia, Gil Vicente FC, S.C. Braga, S.C. Farense and C.S. Marítimo.

In summer 2001, aged 30, Pinto signed for Segunda Liga club Académica de Coimbra, helping to win promotion in his only season. He then moved to the lower leagues, seeing out his career in 2010 following spells with G.D. Sesimbra and G.D. Alfarim.

== International career ==
Pinto earned 61 caps for Portugal at youth level, scoring 12 times. He was part of the under-20 squad that won the 1991 FIFA World Youth Championship in Portugal, contributing three appearances to this feat; additionally, he finished second in the 1994 edition of the UEFA European Under-21 Championship.

After retiring, Pinto worked with the Portuguese Football Federation in directorial capacities.

== Death ==
Pinto died from leukemia on 8 February 2024, aged 52.
