= Fran (footballer, born 1969) =

Spanish footballer

Personal information
- Full name: Francisco Javier González Pérez
- Date of birth: 14 July 1969 (age 57)
- Place of birth: Carreira, Spain
- Height: 1.79 m (5 ft 10 in)
- Position: Midfielder

Youth career
- Carreira
- Deportivo La Coruña

Senior career*
Years	Team	Apps	(Gls)
1987–1988	Fabril		
1988–2005	Deportivo La Coruña	550	(56)

International career
1993–2000	Spain	16	(2)

Managerial career
- 2016–2024: Galicia
- * Club domestic league appearances and goals

Francisco Javier González Pérez (Spanish pronunciation: [fɾanˈθisko xaˈβjeɾ ɣonˈθaleθ ˈpeɾeθ]; born 14 July 1969), known as Fran, is a Spanish former professional footballer.

He spent his entire career with Deportivo as a skilled left midfielder with passing ability, helping the club win the first La Liga title in its history.

Fran represented Spain at Euro 2000.

== Club career ==
Fran, one of the most notable players in Deportivo de La Coruña's history, was born in Carreira, Santa Uxía de Ribeira, Galicia, and was promoted to the first team in 1988, making his La Liga debut on 31 August 1991 in a 2–1 away loss against Valencia. Quickly established, he only missed eight league games in his first five seasons – also scoring on 24 occasions – while already being captain.

In the 1995–96 off-season, Real Madrid almost signed Fran (previously, in early 1992 and unbeknownst to him, he had agreed to a pre-contract with that club after having already put pen to paper to a new deal at Deportivo), but he regretted leaving and returned quickly. In 1999–2000, as Depor claimed their first national championship, injuries limited him to only 22 matches, and he added a goal in a 2–0 home win over Valencia on 12 March 2000.

Fran retired from football at the end of the 2004–05 campaign after 17 years at the Estadio Riazor, 14 in the first division, at the same time as Mauro Silva, with both playing their last game on 22 May 2005 in a 3–0 home defeat to Mallorca. He made 700 competitive appearances.

In 2008, Fran returned to Deportivo, joining its indoor soccer team alongside former teammates Djalminha, Donato, Noureddine Naybet and Jacques Songo'o.

== International career ==
Fran made his Spain national team debut on 27 January 1993, in a friendly 1–1 draw against Mexico in Las Palmas. He earned 16 caps in total, participating at UEFA Euro 2000 where he played his last international, a 4–3 group stage victory over Yugoslavia.

In April 2016, Fran was appointed Galicia's manager alongside Míchel Salgado. He left the role eight years later.

== Personal life ==
Fran's older brother, José Ramón, was also a footballer (and a midfielder). He too spent several seasons with Deportivo, but with much less individual impact.

His son Nicolás is also involved in the sport. Having been brought up at Barcelona, he later played for Porto and Manchester City.

== Career statistics ==
Scores and results list Spain's goal tally first, score column indicates score after each Fran goal.

List of international goals scored by Fran
No.	Date	Venue	Opponent	Score	Result	Competition
1	27 March 1999	Mestalla, Valencia, Spain	Austria	9–0	9–0	Euro 2000 qualifying
2	31 March 1999	Olimpico, Serravalle, San Marino	San Marino	1–0	6–0	Euro 2000 qualifying

== Honours ==
- La Liga: 1999–2000
- Copa del Rey: 1994–95, 2001–02
- Supercopa de España: 1995, 2000, 2002

== See also ==
- List of La Liga players (400+ appearances)
- List of one-club men in association football
