= José Miguel Prieto =

Spanish footballer (born 1971)

Personal information
- Full name: José Miguel Prieto Castillo
- Date of birth: 22 November 1971 (age 54)
- Place of birth: Albacete, Spain
- Height: 1.83 m (6 ft 0 in)
- Position: Centre-back

Youth career
- Albacete

Senior career*
Years	Team	Apps	(Gls)
1988–1989	Albacete	18	(0)
1989–1990	Sevilla B	19	(0)
1990–2003	Sevilla	251	(2)
Total		288	(2)

International career
1989–1990	Spain U18	15	(0)
1991	Spain U19	3	(0)
1992–1994	Spain U21	14	(0)
Medal record
Men's football
Representing Spain
UEFA European Under-21 Championship
Bronze medal – third place	1994 France
- * Club domestic league appearances and goals

José Miguel Prieto Castillo (born 22 November 1971) is a Spanish former professional footballer who played as a central defender.

Nicknamed Shark due to his fierce character, he appeared in 285 competitive games for Sevilla in a 15-year senior career.

== Club career ==
Born in Albacete, Castilla–La Mancha, Prieto started out as a senior with local Albacete Balompié in the Segunda División B. In the summer of 1989 the 17-year-old signed for Sevilla FC, being assigned to the reserve side who competed in the same level.

Prieto made his La Liga debut on 21 January 1990, playing the full 90 minutes in a 2–1 away win against CD Tenerife. He totalled just 16 first-team appearances in his first two full seasons, however.

Prieto scored his only top-flight goal on 9 April 1994, the only at Sporting de Gijón. From 1996 to 2001 he experienced two promotions and as many relegations with his main club, partnering mainly Juan Martagón in the centre of the defence.

Prieto retired in June 2003 at the age of 31, after several knee problems.

== International career ==
Prieto earned 32 caps for Spain at youth level, including 14 for the under-21 team. He was sent off on his debut on 14 January 1992, a 0–0 friendly draw in Portugal.

== Honours ==
Sevilla

- Segunda División: 2000–01

Spain U21

- UEFA European Under-21 Championship third place: 1994
