= Toni (footballer, born 1972) =

Portuguese/Bissau-Guinean footballer

Personal information
- Full name: Nélson António Soares da Gama
- Date of birth: 2 August 1972 (age 54)
- Place of birth: Bissau, Guinea
- Height: 1.78 m (5 ft 10 in)
- Position: Striker

Youth career
- 1988–1991: Porto

Senior career*
Years	Team	Apps	(Gls)
1991–1995	Porto	25	(2)
1994	→ Braga (loan)	19	(4)
1994–1995	→ Beira-Mar (loan)	17	(3)
1995–1998	Salgueiros	72	(14)
1998–2000	Marítimo	15	(3)
2000	Burgos	8	(3)
2000–2001	Leça	6	(0)
2001–2003	Vilanovense	55	(6)
2003–2005	Hamm Benfica		
2008–2012	Union 05		
Total		217	(35)

International career
1990–1991	Portugal U20	11	(2)
1992–1994	Portugal U21	20	(12)
Medal record
Men's football
Representing Portugal
FIFA U-20 World Cup
Winner	1991 Portugal
UEFA European Under-21 Championship
Runner-up	1994 France
- * Club domestic league appearances and goals

Nélson António Soares da Gama (born 2 August 1972 in Bissau, Portuguese Guinea), commonly known as Toni, is a Portuguese former professional footballer who played as a striker.
