= Bebeto =

Brazilian footballer and politician (born 1964)

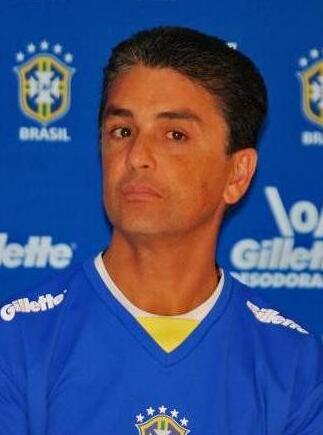
- Bebeto in 2010

Member of the Legislative Assembly of Rio de Janeiro
- In office 1 February 2011 – 31 January 2023

Personal details
- Born: José Roberto Gama de Oliveira; 16 February 1964 (age 62) Salvador, Bahia, Brazil
- Party: PODE (2017–present)
- Other political affiliations: PDT (2009–13; 2016–17); SD (2013–16)
- Height: 1.74 m (5 ft 9 in)
- Spouse: Denise de Oliveira (m. 1988)
- Children: 3, including Mattheus
- Profession: Former football player and coach
Association football career
- Position: Forward
Youth career
- 1981: Bahia
- 1981–1982: Vitória
Senior career*
Years	Team	Apps	(Gls)
1982	Vitória	1	(1)
1983–1989	Flamengo	286	(144)
1989–1992	Vasco da Gama	115	(59)
1992–1996	Deportivo La Coruña	154	(104)
1996	Flamengo	21	(7)
1996–1997	Sevilla	6	(0)
1997	Vitória	20	(18)
1997	Cruzeiro	1	(0)
1998–1999	Botafogo	58	(27)
1999	Toros Neza	8	(2)
2000	Kashima Antlers	8	(1)
2000	Vitória	3	(0)
2001	Vasco da Gama	8	(2)
2002	Al-Ittihad	5	(1)
Total		694	(366)
International career
1987–1996	Brazil Olympic (O.P.)	6	(6)
1985–1998	Brazil	75	(39)
Managerial career
- 2009–2010: America (RJ)
Medal record
Men's Football
Representing Brazil
FIFA World Cup
Winner	1994 United States
Runner-up	1998 France
FIFA Confederations Cup
Winner	1997 Saudi Arabia
Copa América
Winner	1989 Brazil
Olympic Games
Silver medal – second place	1988 Seoul	Team
Bronze medal – third place	1996 Atlanta	Team
FIFA U–20 World Cup
Winner	1983 Mexico
South American U-20 Championship
Winner	1983 Bolivia
- * Club domestic league appearances and goals

José Roberto Gama de Oliveira (born 16 February 1964), known as Bebeto (Brazilian Portuguese: [beˈbɛtu]), is a Brazilian politician and former football coach and player who played as a forward. He entered politics in the 2010 Brazilian general elections and was elected to the Legislative Assembly of Rio de Janeiro representing the Democratic Labour Party.

With 39 goals in 75 appearances for Brazil, Bebeto is the sixth highest goalscorer for his national team. He was the top scorer for Brazil at the 1989 Copa América when they won the tournament. At the 1994 FIFA World Cup, he formed a formidable strike partnership with Romário to lead Brazil to a record fourth World Cup title. He was also a member of the Brazilian team that won the 1997 FIFA Confederations Cup, while he won Olympic silver and bronze medals with Brazil at the 1988 and 1996 Summer Olympic Games respectively. In 1989, Bebeto was named South American Footballer of the Year.

In January 2013 and August 2014, Bebeto was named as one of the six Ambassadors of the 2014 FIFA World Cup and Rio 2016 in Brazil, others being Ronaldo, Amarildo, Marta, Carlos Alberto Torres, Mário Zagallo.

== Early career ==
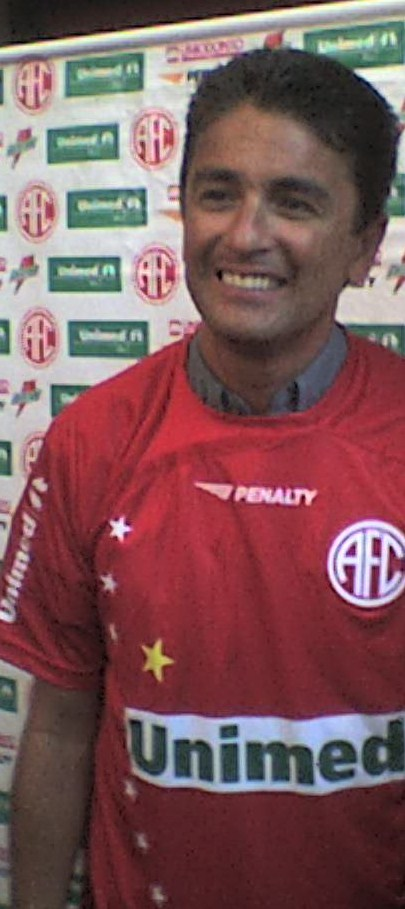
Bebeto in 2009

Bebeto, who was born in Salvador, Bahia, started his career in 1983 with Vitória.

== Club career ==
He played for Flamengo, Vasco da Gama, Cruzeiro and Botafogo in Brazil, Deportivo La Coruña and Sevilla in Spain, Toros Neza in Mexico, Kashima Antlers in Japan, and Al Ittihad in Saudi Arabia, finally retiring in 2002.

=== Deportivo La Coruña ===
Bebeto spent four years in Spain at Deportivo La Coruña, scoring an impressive 86 goals in 131 games. Bebeto became the top scorer in La Liga in his first season at Deportivo, scoring 29 goals in the 1992–93 season. In the next season, 1993–94 season, Deportivo had the chance to win their first ever La Liga title by beating Valencia in the last match of the season. In a very evenly matched contest Deportivo had a golden opportunity to seal the victory and thus the league title. They were given a penalty kick just minutes from the end. The official penalty taker all season had been Bebeto (after Donato, who wasn't in the field), who this time, refused to take the penalty. Eventually, Miroslav Đukić took the penalty and failed to score; hence, the match ended with a 0–0 draw, effectively handing Barcelona the title.

=== Later career ===
In 1996 Bebeto returned to play for native club Flamengo, but after just 15 games, Bebeto returned to Spain to play for Sevilla, for whom he never scored. In 1997, Bebeto joined Cruzeiro for just one match, the 1997 Intercontinental Cup final against Borussia Dortmund. Despite his presence, the Belo Horizonte side lost the match 2–0. Bebeto returned to goalscoring form at native clubs Vitória in late 1997 and Botafogo in early 1998, which saw him being picked for Brazil's World Cup defence in 1998.

In 2001, he was rejected by Scottish side St Mirren, who were willing to pay his wages but had reservations about his fitness. On 5 September 2002, he joined his final club at the age of 38, Al-Ittihad of Saudi Arabia, after pledging to join Vasco da Gama on 28 August.

== International career ==
For Brazil, Bebeto scored 39 goals in 75 caps after making his debut in 1985. He played in three World Cups: 1990, 1994, and 1998. In 1994, he was one of the best players of the tournament, scoring three goals and providing two assists for the eventual champions, and then repeated the feat four years later as Brazil finished second to hosts France.

During the 1994 World Cup, Bebeto formed a formidable partnership with Romário, after they succeeded in putting their personal differences aside. Bebeto and Romário were fierce rivals in the Spanish League. Bebeto led the Spanish first division with 29 goals in 1992–93 and Romário led it with 30 goals in 1993–94. It was Romário who gave Bebeto the nickname Chorao, or Crybaby, for his habit of pouting to referees. It was also Romário who called a news conference before the World Cup to announce that he would not sit next to Bebeto on the team's flight to the United States. Today, however, Bebeto and Romario are friends, with Bebeto claiming that they talk often. In an interview in 2018, Bebeto praised his partnership with Romario: "I played with Romario only in the national team. We played only one game together at Flamengo before he left for Europe. Do you know that Brazil have never lost a game when Bebeto and Romario played together? Not a single game! Besides, every time we played together at least one of us scored."

Bebeto became a household name for his goal celebration in the 1994 World Cup in the United States. His wife had delivered their third child two days before a quarter-final match against the Netherlands in the scorching heat of Dallas. After scoring, Bebeto ran to the sideline, brought his arms together and began rocking an imaginary baby. Teammates Romário and Mazinho quickly joined in. That child, a boy who was named Mattheus, started his football career with the youth side of Brazilian club Flamengo.

He won a silver medal for Brazil in the 1988 Summer Olympics. He was later chosen to be an over-23 player at the 1996 Summer Olympics, scoring a hat-trick in the Bronze medal match against Portugal.

On 8 December 2012 a friendly match was played by Brazil Masters vs IFA All Stars at Salt Lake Stadium, Kolkata, India. Bebeto scored a goal for Brazil Masters as they defeated All Stars by 3–1.

== Style of play ==
Regarded one of Brazil's greatest strikers, Bebeto was a prolific goalscorer and an excellent finisher, who was known for his consistency and determination throughout his career, although he was also injury-prone and was criticised for his character. Despite not being imposing physically due to his lack of height and slender physique, he was a fast and opportunistic player, who used his agility, offensive movement, and intelligence to lose his markers in tight spaces. Due to his vision, outstanding technical skills, close control on the ball, and his ability to play off other strikers and provide them with assists, he was often employed as a playmaking attacking midfielder or as a supporting striker early on in his career, drawing influence from Zico's playing style. He was later deployed as a striker or as a centre-forward, however, where he excelled, due to his eye for goal, and remained in this position for the rest of his career.

== Coaching career ==
Bebeto was hired on 16 December 2009 as América's head coach. After an average performance at the Taça Guanabara, he was sacked on 13 February 2010. He had a record of three wins, one draw and four losses.

== Personal life ==
Bebeto is married to Denise Oliveira, who played volleyball for Flamengo in 1988, with whom he has two sons and one daughter, Stéphannie who is married to Carlos Eduardo. His son, Mattheus, is a professional footballer. Bebeto's brother-in-law, Luiz Fernando Petra, was murdered in 2002, during a federal deputy election in Rio de Janeiro.

== Media ==
Bebeto features in EA Sports' FIFA video game series; he was on the cover of certain editions of FIFA 97.

== Career statistics ==
=== Club ===
Appearances and goals by club, season and competition
Club	Season	League			State league		National cup (Note: Includes Copa do Brasil, Copa del Rey, Copa MX, Emperor's Cup, King Cup)		Continental		Other		Total	
Club	Season	Division	Apps	Goals	Apps	Goals	Apps	Goals	Apps	Goals	Apps	Goals	Apps	Goals
Flamengo	1983	Série A	2	0									2	0
Flamengo	1984	Série A	11	5					7 (Note: Appearances in Copa Libertadores)	4			18	9
Flamengo	1985	Série A	22	9									22	9
Flamengo	1986	Série A	17	5									17	5
Flamengo	1987	Série A	14	6									14	6
Flamengo	1988	Série A	14	9									14	9
Flamengo	Total		80	34					7	4			87	38
Vasco da Gama	1989	Série A	12	6									12	6
Vasco da Gama	1990	Série A	8	1					5	1			13	2
Vasco da Gama	1991	Série A	8	3									8	3
Vasco da Gama	1992	Série A	25	18									25	18
Vasco da Gama	Total		53	28					5	1			58	29
Deportivo La Coruña	1992–93	La Liga	37	29	–		1	0	–		–		38	29
Deportivo La Coruña	1993–94	La Liga	34	16	–		1	0	4 (Note: Appearances in UEFA Cup)	3	–		39	19
Deportivo La Coruña	1994–95	La Liga	26	16	–		1	0	3	4	–		33	20
Deportivo La Coruña	1995–96	La Liga	34	25	–		2	0	5 (Note: Appearances in UEFA Cup Winners' Cup)	6	2 (Note: Appearances in Supercopa de España)	1	43	32
Deportivo La Coruña	Total		131	86	–		5	0	12	13	2	1	150	100
Flamengo	1996	Série A	15	7									15	7
Sevilla	1996–97	La Liga	5	0	–		0	0	–		–		5	0
Vitória	1997	Série A	8	8									8	8
Botafogo	1998	Série A	17	9									17	9
Botafogo	1999	Série A	–											
Botafogo	Total		17	9									17	9
Toros Neza	1998–99	Primera División	8	2	–				–		–		8	2
Kashima Antlers	2000	J1 League	8	1	–				–				8	1
Vitória	2000	Série A	3	0									3	0
Vasco da Gama	2001	Série A	8	2									8	2
Vasco da Gama	2002	Série A	–											
Vasco da Gama	Total		8	2									8	2
Al-Ittihad	2002–03	Saudi Premier League	5	1	–								5	1
Career total			341	178			5	0	24	18	2	1	372	197

=== International ===
Appearances and goals by national team and year
National team	Year	Apps	Goals
Brazil	1985	6	0
Brazil	1986	0	0
Brazil	1987	0	0
Brazil	1988	0	0
Brazil	1989	18	10
Brazil	1990	3	0
Brazil	1991	5	0
Brazil	1992	8	7
Brazil	1993	9	6
Brazil	1994	11	8
Brazil	1995	2	2
Brazil	1996	1	1
Brazil	1997	3	1
Brazil	1998	9	3
Total		75	38

Scores and results list Brazil's goal tally first, score column indicates score after each Bebeto goal.

List of international goals scored by Bebeto
No.	Date	Venue	Opponent	Score	Result	Competition
1	10 May 1989	Fortaleza, Brazil	Peru	2–0	4–1	Friendly
2	8 June 1989	Rio de Janeiro, Brazil	Portugal	1–0	4–0	Friendly
3	1 July 1989	Salvador, Brazil	Venezuela	1–0	3–1	1989 Copa América
4	9 July 1989	Recife, Brazil	Paraguay	1–0	2–0	1989 Copa América
5	9 July 1989	Recife, Brazil	Paraguay	2–0	2–0	1989 Copa América
6	12 July 1989	Rio de Janeiro, Brazil	Argentina	1–0	2–0	1989 Copa América
7	14 July 1989	Rio de Janeiro, Brazil	Paraguay	1–0	3–0	1989 Copa América
8	14 July 1989	Rio de Janeiro, Brazil	Paraguay	2–0	3–0	1989 Copa América
9	30 July 1989	Caracas, Venezuela	Venezuela	3–0	4–0	1990 FIFA World Cup qualification
10	30 July 1989	Caracas, Venezuela	Venezuela	4–0	4–0	1990 FIFA World Cup qualification
11	15 April 1992	Cuiabá, Brazil	Finland	1–1	3–1	Friendly
12	15 April 1992	Cuiabá, Brazil	Finland	2–1	3–1	Friendly
13	17 May 1992	London, England	England	1–0	1–1	Friendly
14	31 July 1992	Los Angeles, United States	Mexico	1–0	5–0	1992 Friendly Cup
15	31 July 1992	Los Angeles, United States	Mexico	3–0	5–0	1992 Friendly Cup
16	2 August 1992	Los Angeles, United States	United States	1–0	1–0	1992 Friendly Cup
17	16 December 1992	Porto Alegre, Brazil	Germany	2–0	3–1	Friendly
18	14 July 1993	Rio de Janeiro, Brazil	Paraguay	2–0	2–0	Friendly
19	1 August 1993	Pueblo Nuevo, Brazil	Venezuela	2–0	5–1	1994 FIFA World Cup qualification
20	1 August 1993	Pueblo Nuevo, Brazil	Venezuela	4–0	5–1	1994 FIFA World Cup qualification
21	22 August 1993	São Paulo, Brazil	Ecuador	1–0	2–0	1994 FIFA World Cup qualification
22	29 August 1993	Recife, Brazil	Bolivia	3–0	6–0	1994 FIFA World Cup qualification
23	29 August 1993	Recife, Brazil	Bolivia	6–0	6–0	1994 FIFA World Cup qualification
24	23 March 1994	Recife, Brazil	Argentina	1–0	2–0	Friendly
25	23 March 1994	Recife, Brazil	Argentina	2–0	2–0	Friendly
26	8 June 1994	San Diego, United States	Honduras	3–0	8–2	Friendly
27	8 June 1994	San Diego, United States	Honduras	4–1	8–2	Friendly
28	12 June 1994	Fresno, United States	El Salvador	2–0	4–0	Friendly
29	24 June 1994	Palo Alto, United States	Cameroon	3–0	3–0	1994 FIFA World Cup
30	4 July 1994	Palo Alto, United States	United States	1–0	1–0	1994 FIFA World Cup
31	9 July 1994	Dallas, United States	Netherlands	2–0	3–2	1994 FIFA World Cup
32	22 February 1995	Fortaleza, Brazil	Slovakia	2–0	5–0	Friendly
33	22 February 1995	Fortaleza, Brazil	Slovakia	5–0	5–0	Friendly
34	24 April 1996	Johannesburg, South Africa	South Africa	3–2	3–2	Friendly
35	6 December 1997	Johannesburg, South Africa	South Africa	2–0	2–1	Friendly
36	16 June 1998	Nantes, France	Morocco	3–0	3–0	1998 FIFA World Cup
37	23 June 1998	Marseille, France	Norway	1–0	1–2	1998 FIFA World Cup
38	3 July 1998	Nantes, France	Denmark	1–1	3–2	1998 FIFA World Cup

== Honours ==
Flamengo

- Campeonato Brasileiro Série A: 1983, 1987
- Campeonato Carioca: 1986
- Taça Guanabara: 1984, 1988, 1989

Vasco da Gama

- Campeonato Brasileiro Série A: 1989
- Taça Guanabara: 1990

Deportivo La Coruña

- Copa del Rey: 1994–95
- Supercopa de España: 1995

Botafogo

- Torneio Rio-São Paulo: 1998

Kashima Antlers

- J League: 2000
- Emperor's Cup: 2000
- J.League Cup: 2000

Brazil U20

- FIFA U-20 World Cup: 1983

Brazil U23

- Pan American Games: 1987
- Olympic Games Silver medal: 1988; Bronze medal: 1996

Brazil

- FIFA World Cup: 1994
- Copa América: 1989
- FIFA Confederations Cup: 1997

Individual

- Campeonato Carioca top scorer: 1988, 1989
- Copa América top scorer: 1989
- South American Footballer of the Year: 1989
- South American Team of the Year: 1989
- Bola de Prata: 1992
- World Soccer World XI: 1992
- Campeonato Brasileiro Série A top scorer: 1992
- Pichichi Trophy: 1992–93
- La Liga Team of The Year: 1993
- Olympic Games top scorer: 1996
- Torneio Rio-São Paulo top scorer: 1999
- World Soccer: The 100 Greatest Footballers of All Time
- Brazilian Football Museum Hall of Fame

== See also ==
- List of FIFA World Cup top goalscorers
