= José Ramón (footballer, born 1968) =

Spanish footballer and manager

Personal information
- Full name: José Ramón González Pérez
- Date of birth: 20 May 1968 (age 58)
- Place of birth: Carreira, Spain
- Height: 1.74 m (5 ft 9 in)
- Position: Midfielder

Team information
- Current team: Deportivo La Coruña (youth)

Youth career
- Carreira
- Deportivo La Coruña

Senior career*
Years	Team	Apps	(Gls)
1986–1987	Fabril		
1987–1995	Deportivo La Coruña	194	(21)
1995–1998	Compostela	84	(6)
1998–2000	Deportivo La Coruña	1	(0)
2000–2001	Ourense	11	(0)
Total		290	(27)

Managerial career
- 2003–2004: Atlético Arteixo
- 2009–2010: Montañeros
- 2011–2012: Montañeros
- 2014–: Deportivo La Coruña (youth)
- * Club domestic league appearances and goals

José Ramón González Pérez (born 20 May 1968), known as José Ramón, is a Spanish former professional footballer who played as a midfielder.

== Career ==
Born in Carreira, Santa Uxía de Ribeira, José Ramón played ten seasons with Deportivo de La Coruña in two separate spells, but featured sparingly when the team competed in La Liga. He also represented Galician neighbours Compostela in the top division, where he amassed totals of 159 games and 13 goals.

José Ramón retired in 2001 at the age of 33, and subsequently worked as a manager, almost exclusively with Montañeros of Segunda División B. On 18 July 2014, he returned to his main club as a youth coach.

== Personal life ==
Ramón's younger brother, Fran, was a legend at Depor, and was also a Spanish international. His nephew, Nicolás, is also involved in the sport.

== Honours ==
Deportivo

- Copa del Rey: 1994–95
