= Ezequiel Castillo (footballer) =

Argentine footballer

Personal information
- Full name: Ezequiel Marcelo Castillo Montes
- Date of birth: 13 June 1967 (age 59)
- Place of birth: Buenos Aires, Argentina
- Height: 1.76 m (5 ft 9 in)
- Position: Midfielder

Senior career*
Years	Team	Apps	(Gls)
1987–1988	Argentinos Juniors		
1989–1992	Español	56	(2)
1992–1995	Tenerife	96	(8)
1995–1998	Rayo Vallecano	107	(9)
1998–2000	Badajoz	62	(4)
2007	Sportivo Patria		
Total		321	(23)
- * Club domestic league appearances and goals

Ezequiel Marcelo Castillo Montes (born 13 June 1967 in Buenos Aires) is an Argentine retired footballer who played as a midfielder.

== Football career ==
After starting professionally with Argentinos Juniors, Castillo moved in Spain in January 1989, going on to spend the following 11 years in the country, with RCD Español, CD Tenerife, Rayo Vallecano and CD Badajoz – the latter in the second division – always as an important first-team member. He amassed totals of 224 games and 15 goals in La Liga.

In 2007, seven years after retiring, Castillo returned to active, with lowly Sportivo Patria in his native country (he had already been awarded Spanish citizenship).
