= Carreira (Ribeira) =

Parish in Galicia, Spain

Coordinates: 42°32′23″N 9°00′40″W

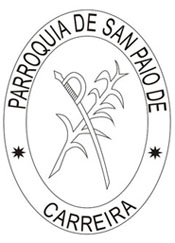
Parochial seal of San Paio de Carreira

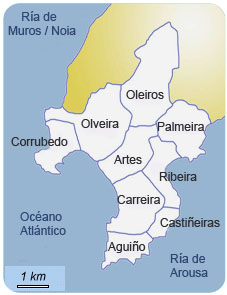
Municipality of Santa Uxía de Ribeira showing its constituent parishes

Carreira (officially, San Paio de Carreira) is one of the nine parishes (along with Aguiño, Artes, Castiñeiras, Corrubedo, Oleiros, Olveira, Palmeira, and Ribeira) of the municipality of Santa Uxía de Ribeira, Galicia, Spain.

The parish includes the settlements of Agro da Cuña, A Aldea Vella, As Bouzas, Os Buxos, Campos de Abaixo, Campos de Arriba, A Capela, Carreiriña, As Cartas, Casalnovo, Castro, Covelo, O Cruce, A Estrada, A Fieiteira, A Filgueira, Frións, A Graña, A Granxa, Laxes, Liboi, A Mámoa, Montevixán, O Outeiro, Parte ó Río, Pé do Corniño, As Pedriñas, A Pedrosa, O Quinteiro, A Revolta, O Rueiro, Sabartán, Sampaio, Sobreira, O Vilar, and Vixán.

In the early 1990s school-age children in Carreira were educated at the unitary parish school until grade three and continued their education in Zas.

== Images of the Parish of Carreira ==
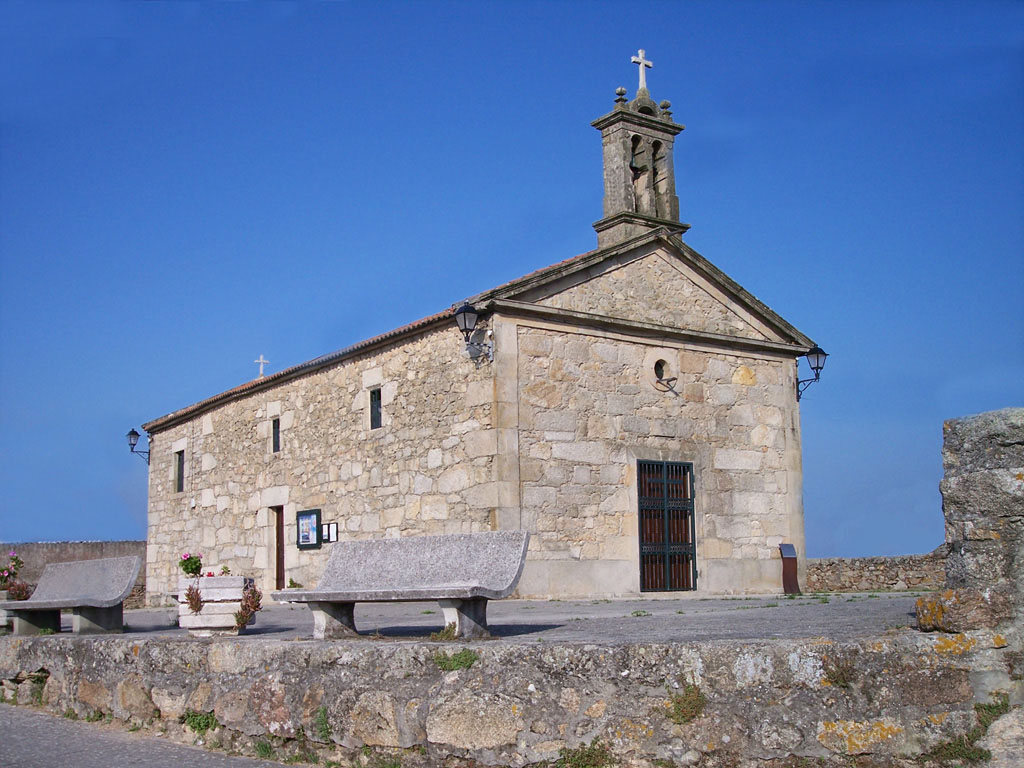
Chapel of Nosa Señora da Guía

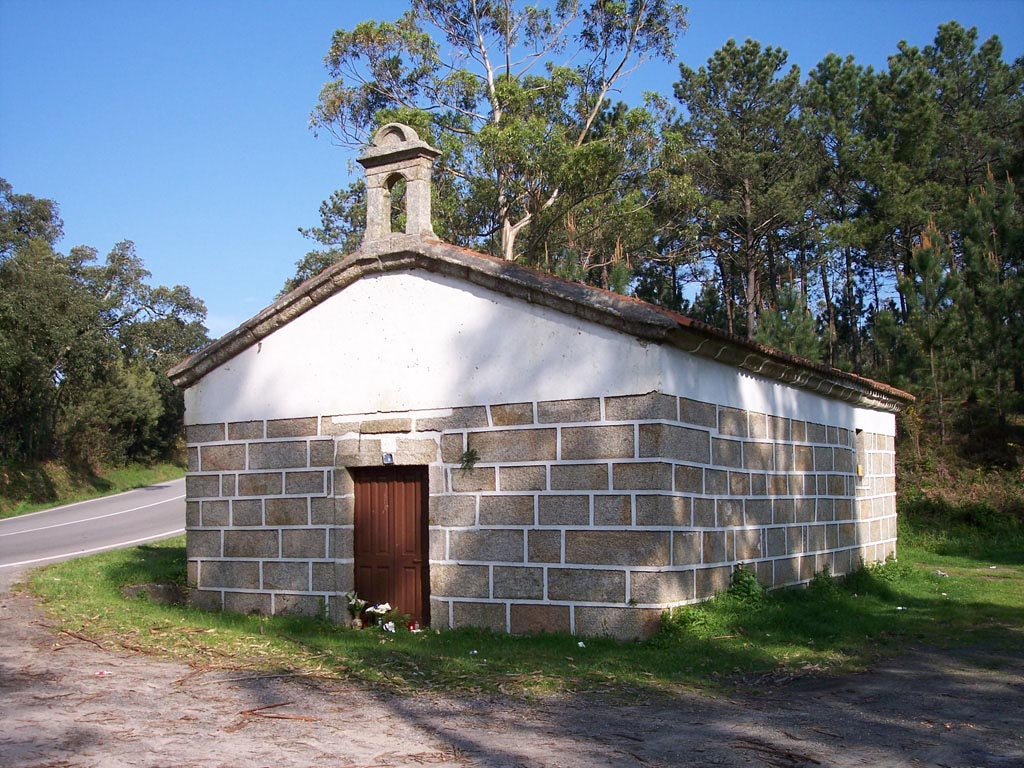
Chapel of San Roque da Granxa

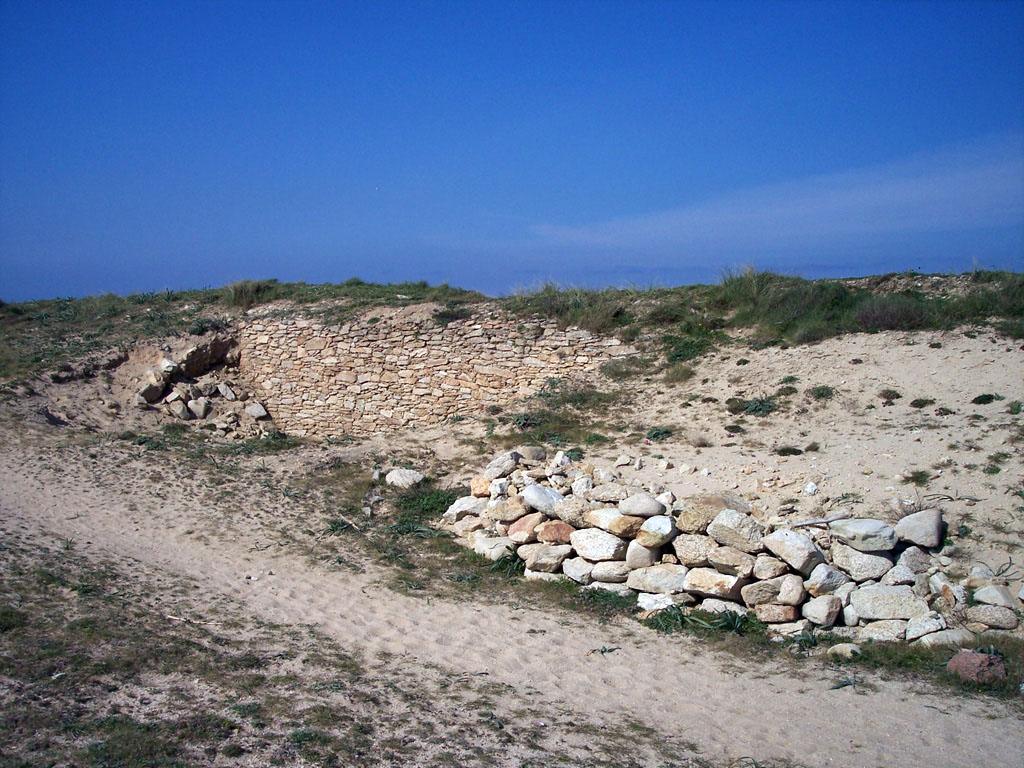
Celtic Hill-fort of Porto de Baixo

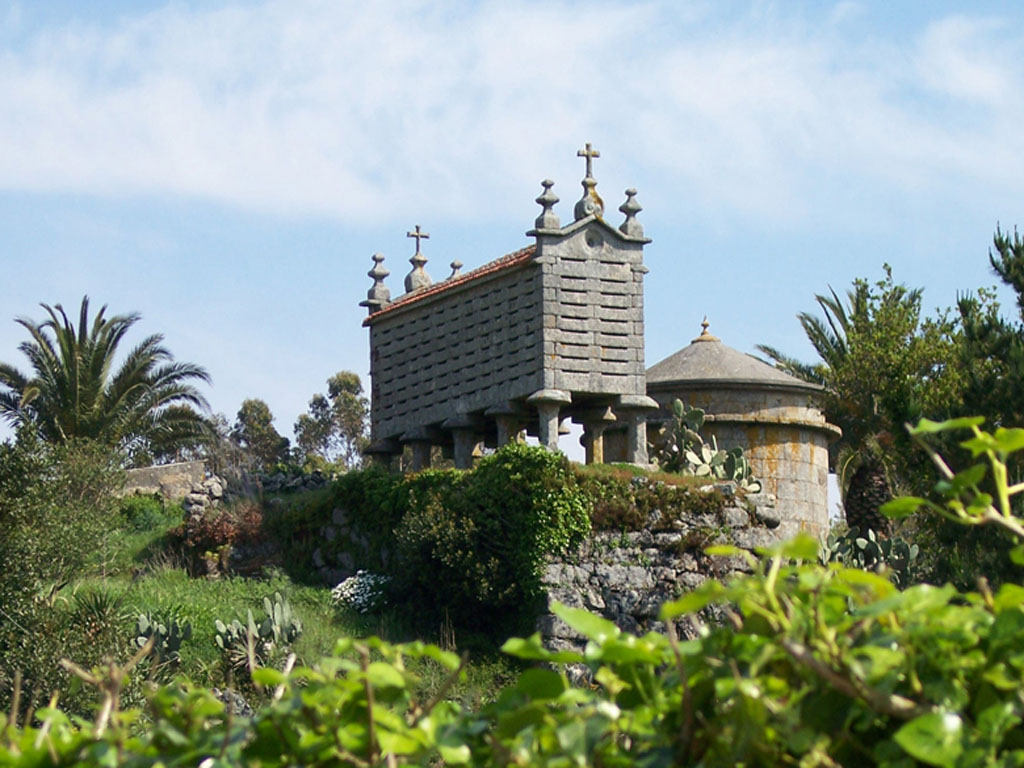
Hórreo in Sampaio

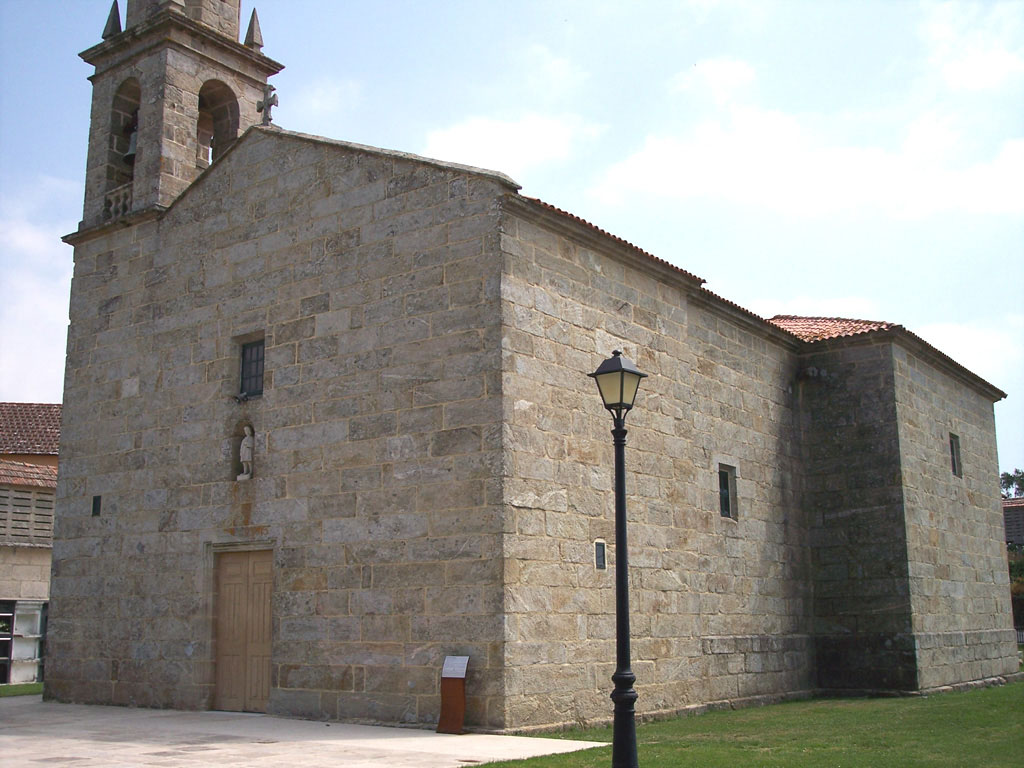
Sampaio church

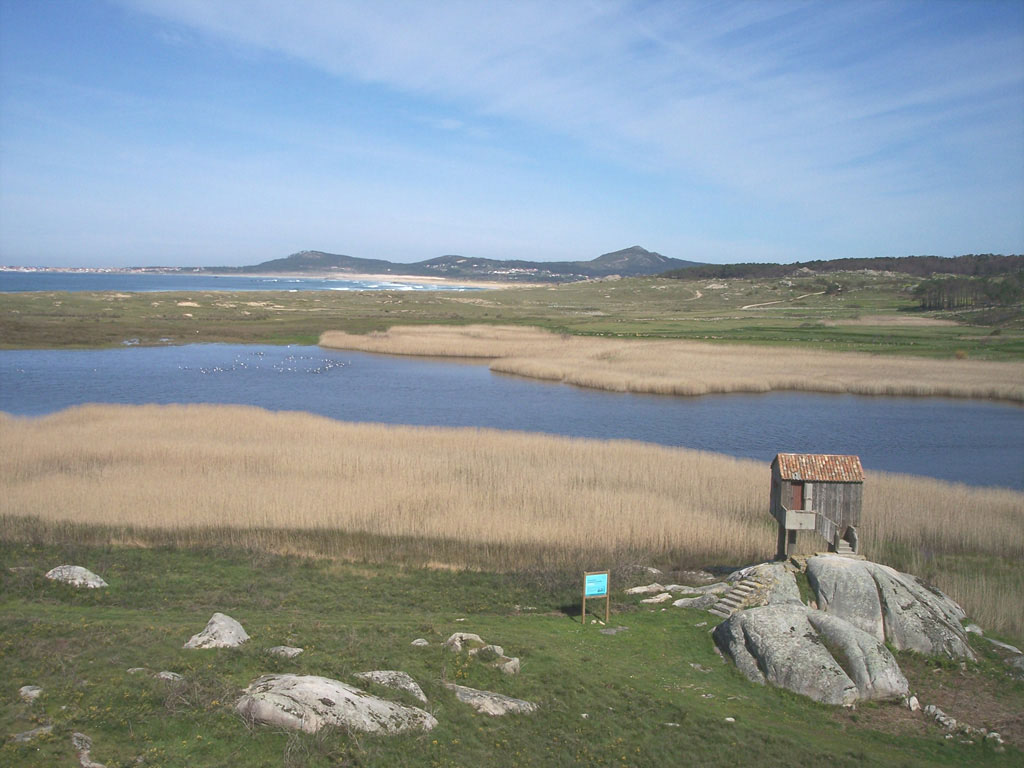
Vixán lagoon

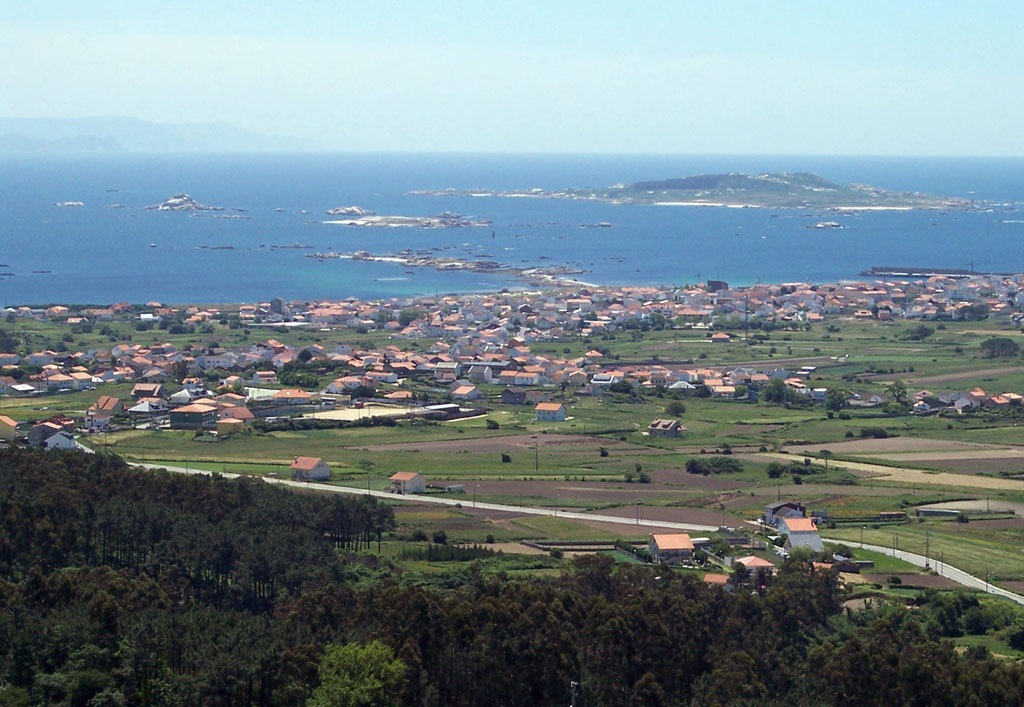
View from Mount A Cidá

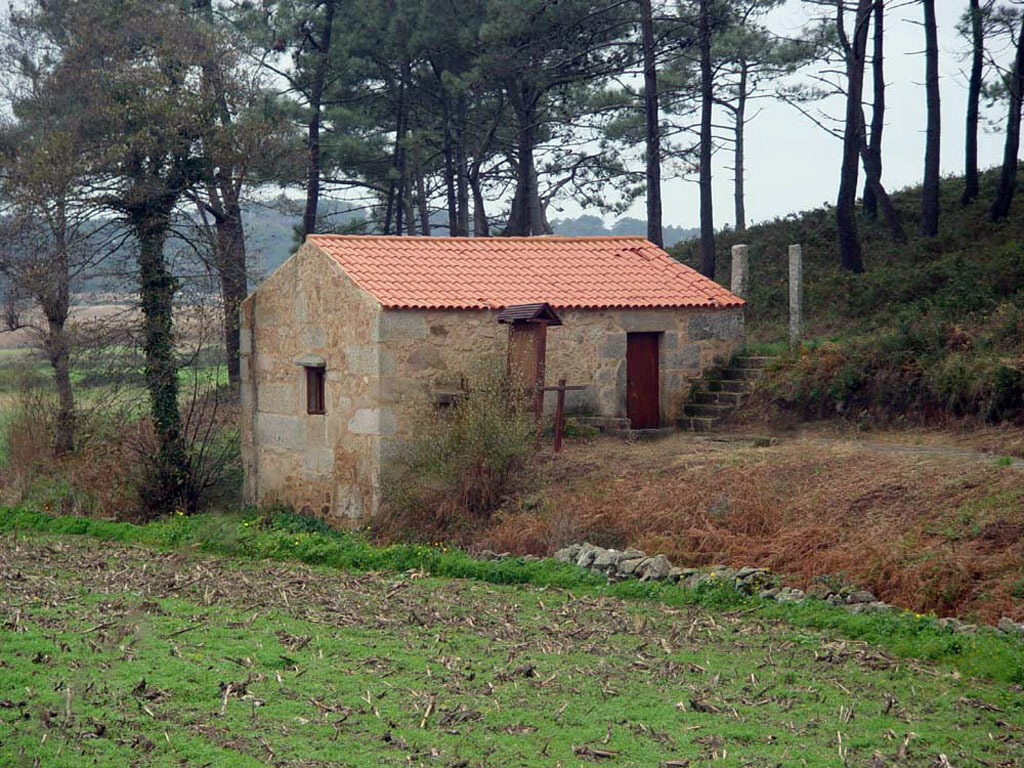
Old watermill

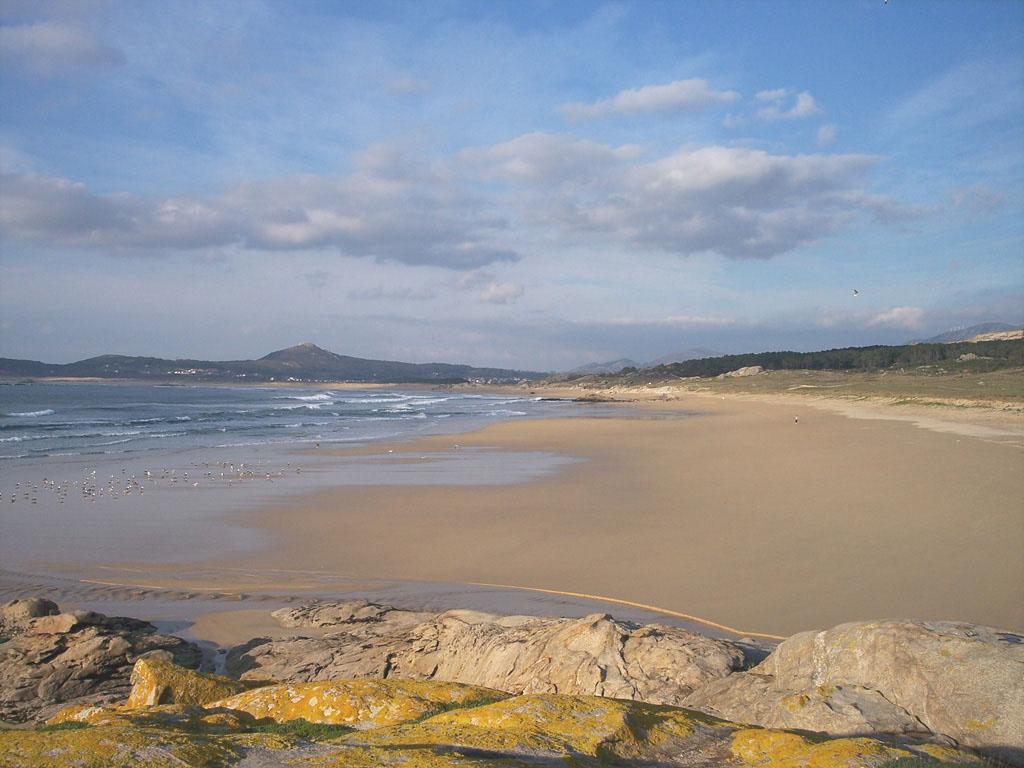
Anquieiro beach

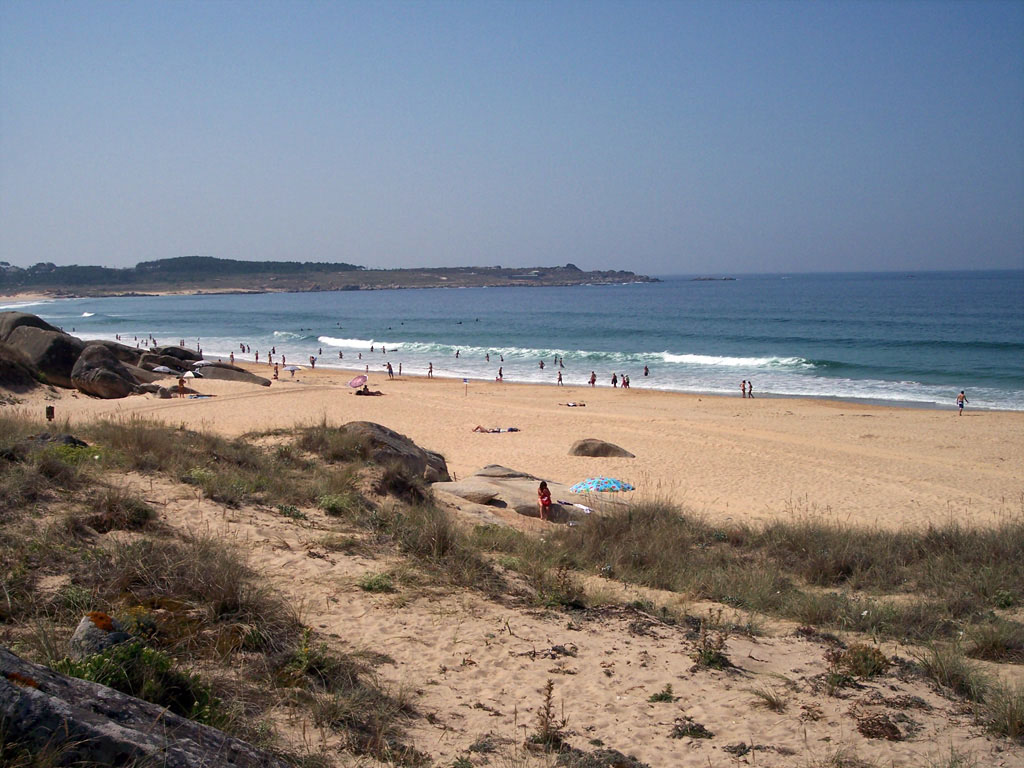
O Vilar beach

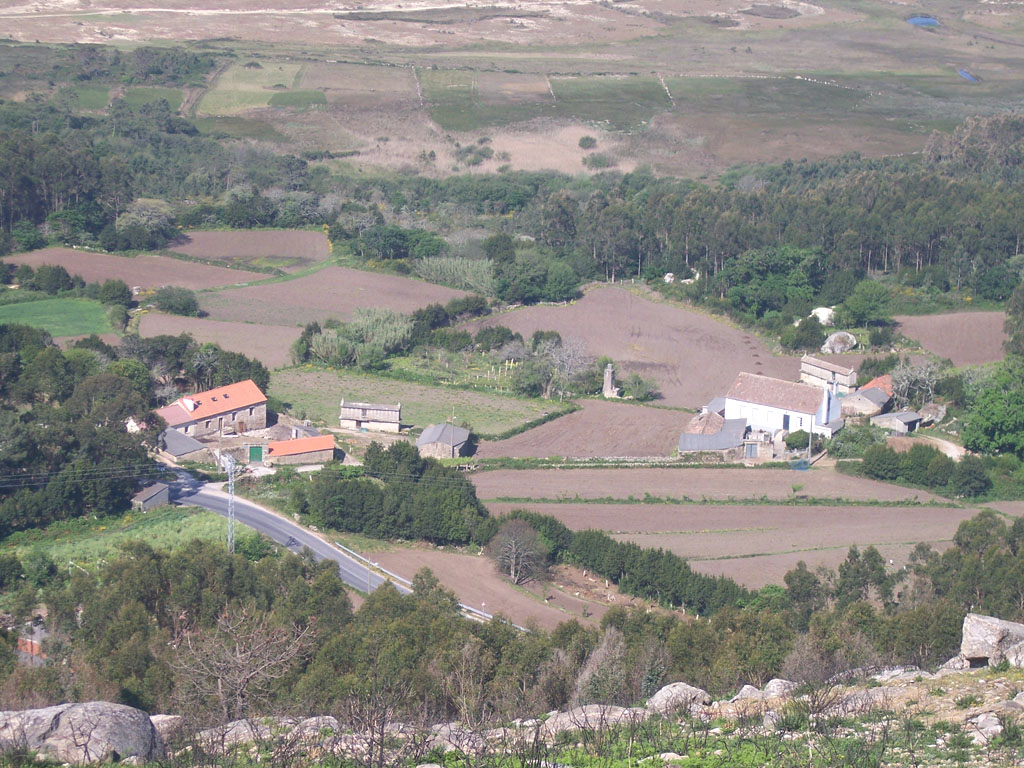
Casalnovo

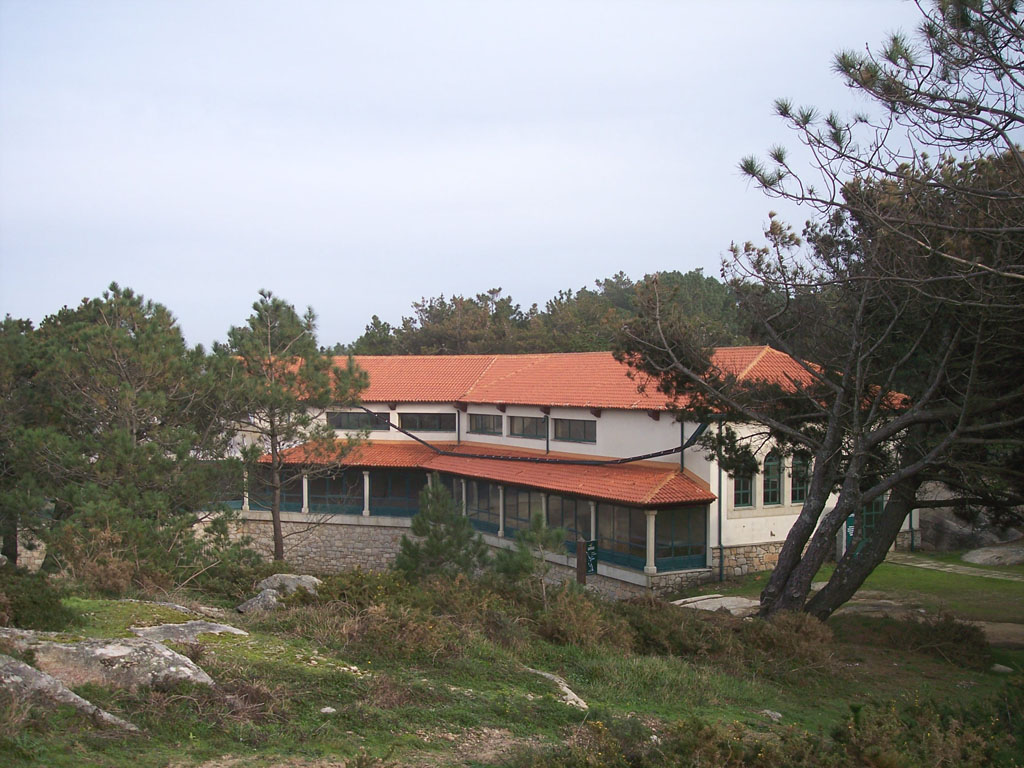
C.I.E.L.G.A. Natural Park
