= Luis López Rekarte =

Spanish footballer (born 1962)

Personal information
- Full name: Luis María López Rekarte
- Date of birth: 26 March 1962 (age 64)
- Place of birth: Mondragón, Spain
- Height: 1.75 m (5 ft 9 in)
- Position: Right-back

Youth career
- Aretxabaleta
- Alavés

Senior career*
Years	Team	Apps	(Gls)
1980–1985	Alavés	114	(9)
1985–1988	Real Sociedad	92	(2)
1988–1991	Barcelona	59	(0)
1991–1996	Deportivo La Coruña	149	(5)
1996–1997	Mallorca	11	(0)
Total		425	(16)

International career
1988	Spain U23	1	(0)
1988	Spain	4	(0)
1993–1994	Basque Country	2	(0)
- * Club domestic league appearances and goals

Luis María López Rekarte (born 26 March 1962) is a Spanish former professional footballer who played mainly as a right-back.

He amassed La Liga totals of 300 games and seven goals over 11 seasons, representing in the competition Deportivo (five years), Real Sociedad and Barcelona (three apiece) and winning six major titles.

== Club career ==
Born in Mondragón, Basque Country, López Rekarte's first sport was track and field (with a personal best of 10.05 in the 100 metres). He made his professional debut in football with Alavés amidst the massive financial difficulties the club endured, culminating with the relegation to the Segunda División B in 1983. Two years later, he signed with neighbouring Real Sociedad.

Forming a defensive quarter with legendary Alberto Górriz, Agustín Gajate and Juan Antonio Larrañaga, López Rekarte started for a side that won the Copa del Rey in 1987. The following year, they emerged runners-up in both domestic competitions.

López Rekarte joined Barcelona after losing the 1988 Spanish cup final to the La Liga giants, alongside teammates José Mari Bakero and Txiki Begiristain. Relatively utilised in his first two seasons, he featured rarely in Barça's 1991 league conquest, all but one of his 13 appearances being as a used substitute; his greatest moment with the Catalans came in the final of the 1988–89 Cup Winners' Cup, where he was brought from the bench to close the 2–0 victory.

Being a crucial member of a rising Deportivo de La Coruña side soon dubbed Super Depor – he never played less than 25 matches during his spell at the Estadio Riazor – López Rekarte retired in 1997 at the age of 35 after another stint in the Segunda División, now with Mallorca.

== International career ==
López Rekarte had four caps for Spain in 1988, the first coming in a friendly against East Germany on 27 January, in Valencia (0–0).

== Personal life ==
López Rekarte was the older brother of another professional footballer, Aitor, who also played for Real Sociedad, also being a right-back and an international. His niece, Maitane López, was also involved in the sport.

After retiring, he worked as Aitor's agent. He later engaged in mountaineering.

== Honours ==
Real Sociedad

- Copa del Rey: 1986–87

Barcelona

- La Liga: 1990–91
- Copa del Rey: 1989–90
- UEFA Cup Winners' Cup: 1988–89

Deportivo

- Copa del Rey: 1994–95
- Supercopa de España: 1995
