= Juan Canales =

Spanish footballer & manager (born 1966)

Personal information
- Full name: Juan Garrido Canales
- Date of birth: 22 November 1966 (age 59)
- Place of birth: Ossa de Montiel, Spain
- Height: 1.80 m (5 ft 11 in)
- Position: Goalkeeper

Team information
- Current team: Eldense (goalkeeping coach)

Youth career
- –1983: Eldense

Senior career*
Years	Team	Apps	(Gls)
1983–1989	Castilla	72	(0)
1984–1985	Real Madrid	1	(0)
1985–1986	Real Madrid Aficionados	33	(0)
1989–1990	Xerez	2	(0)
1990–1991	Logroñés	30	(0)
1991–1996	Deportivo La Coruña	31	(0)
1996–1999	Las Palmas	14	(0)
1999–2000	Universidad LP	0	(0)
2000–2004	Eldense		
Total		183	(0)
- * Club domestic league appearances and goals

Juan Garrido Canales (born 22 November 1966 in Ossa de Montiel, Albacete, Castilla–La Mancha) is a Spanish former professional football goalkeeper and current goalkeeping coach of CD Eldense.

== Playing career ==
Canales's family moved to Elda in the province of Alicante when he was a child, and he began his career in the youth teams of local side Eldense. He joined Castilla, the reserve side of giants Real Madrid, in 1983, and made his La Liga debut for the first team aged just seventeen the following year due to a players' strike. What would prove to be his only appearance for the Real first team came on 9 September, in a 1–1 draw with Sporting de Gijón at El Molinón.

Canales spent the 1985–86 season with the C team, Real Madrid Aficionados, in the Tercera División, making 33 appearances. For the next three years, he continued to play with Castilla, being first choice goalkeeper in the latter two of these. However, by 1989, he found himself well down the pecking order for a place with the first team, behind established first choice Paco Buyo, the experienced Agustín, and the emerging youngster Santiago Cañizares. He therefore decided to join Segunda División side Xerez that summer, but only played twice that season. He moved again the following year, signing for Logroñés in the top flight. He was immediately the first choice of coach David Vidal, and he played 30 La Liga matches during the 1990–91 season.

His fine form earned him a move to the ambitious and newly promoted Deportivo La Coruña in the summer of 1991. He was intended to be Depor's first choice, but an unfortunate injury that summer prompted the signing of Francisco Liaño from Sestao Sport, who would go on to be first choice for the majority of the next five years. He played just eleven games in his first season, and none at all in the following two thanks to an injury sustained in an incident with a truck. 1994–95 was much better, as he made 12 appearances, and when John Toshack was appointed as manager to replace the retiring Arsenio Iglesias in the summer of 1995, he declared that Canales would be his number one goalkeeper for the ensuing season. However, he reverted to Liaño after just seven matches.

In the summer of 1996, Deportivo signed Czech keeper Petr Kouba from Sparta Prague and Cameroonian Jacques Songo'o from Metz, and the arrival of these two internationals heralded the end of Canales's career at the club. He joined second tier side Las Palmas in December, and was first choice until the end of that season. However, the arrival of Yugoslavian Željko Cicović from Rad in 1997 saw him relegated to the bench once more, and he played just once over the following two seasons before leaving the club in 1999. He stayed in the same city for one more year, signing for Universidad Las Palmas for the 1999–2000 Segunda División B season, although he didn't play any matches. He then returned to his roots by rejoining Eldense, with whom he spent four years in the Tercera División before retiring in 2004 at the age of 37.

== Coaching career ==
After his retirement, Canales stayed on at Eldense as goalkeeping coach. He later coached at two Alicante based clubs, Hércules and Alicante CF, before returning to Real Madrid in 2008 as goalkeeping coach to the Castilla and Juvenil A sides. In June 2013, newly appointed manager Carlo Ancelotti promoted him to the same duties with the first team, making him coach to legendary Real and Spain international keeper Iker Casillas. Since 2016, he has been the goalkeeping coach of UCAM Murcia.

== Honours ==
Real Madrid

- UEFA Cup: 1984–85
- Copa de la Liga: 1985

Deportivo La Coruña

- Copa del Rey: 1994–95
- Supercopa de España: 1995

Universidad Las Palmas

- Segunda División B: 1999–2000

== Career statistics ==
As of 27 April 2021

Club	Season	League			Cup		Europe		Other		Total	
Club	Season	Division	Apps	Goals	Apps	Goals	Apps	Goals	Apps	Goals	Apps	Goals
Real Madrid	1984–85	La Liga	1	0	0	0	0	0	0	0	1	0
Real Madrid Aficionados	1985–86	Tercera División	33	0	0	0	–		0	0	33	0
Castilla	1986–87	Segunda División	13	0	1	0	–		–		14	0
Castilla	1987–88	Segunda División	25	0	8	0	–		–		33	0
Castilla	1988–89	Segunda División	34	0	4	0	–		–		38	0
Castilla	Total		72	0	13	0	0	0	0	0	85	0
Xerez	1989–90	Segunda División	2	0	2	0	–		–		4	0
Logroñés	1990–91	La Liga	30	0	7	0	–		–		37	0
Deportivo La Coruña	1991–92	La Liga	11	0	2	0	–		2	0	15	0
Deportivo La Coruña	1992–93	La Liga	0	0	0	0	–		–		0	0
Deportivo La Coruña	1993–94	La Liga	0	0	1	0	0	0	–		1	0
Deportivo La Coruña	1994–95	La Liga	12	0	1	0	4	0	–		17	0
Deportivo La Coruña	1995–96	La Liga	7	0	0	0	2	0	2	0	11	0
Deportivo La Coruña	1996–97	La Liga	1	0	0	0	–		–		1	0
Deportivo La Coruña	Total		31	0	4	0	6	0	4	0	45	0
Las Palmas	1996–97	Segunda División	13	0	2	0	–		–		15	0
Las Palmas	1997–98	Segunda División	1	0	3	0	–		–		4	0
Las Palmas	1998–99	Segunda División	0	0	4	0	–		–		4	0
Las Palmas	Total		14	0	9	0	0	0	0	0	23	0
Universidad Las Palmas	1999–2000	Segunda División B	0	0	1	0	–		–		1	0
Career total			183	0	36	0	6	0	4	0	229	0

1. Appearances in the 1991–92 La Liga relegation playoff
2. Appearances in the 1994–95 UEFA Cup
3. Appearances in the 1995–96 UEFA Cup Winners' Cup
4. Appearances in the 1995 Supercopa de España
