= Francisco Liaño =

Spanish footballer (born 1964)

Personal information
- Full name: Francisco Liaño Fernández
- Date of birth: 16 November 1964 (age 61)
- Place of birth: Santander, Spain
- Height: 1.86 m (6 ft 1 in)
- Position: Goalkeeper

Senior career*
Years	Team	Apps	(Gls)
1983–1990	Racing Santander	23	(0)
1990–1991	Sestao	38	(0)
1991–1996	Deportivo La Coruña	154	(0)
1996–1998	Sporting Gijón	2	(0)
Total		217	(0)
- * Club domestic league appearances and goals

Francisco Liaño Fernández (born 16 November 1964) is a Spanish retired footballer who played as a goalkeeper.

Although he represented four clubs during 15 years as a senior, his professional career was closely associated to Deportivo, during their rise to Super Depor in the early 1990s. He also won two Zamora Trophy awards.

== Club career ==
=== Racing ===
Born in Santander, Cantabria, Liaño began his football career at hometown's Racing de Santander, where he made his first-team – and La Liga – debut on 9 September 1984. He spent six seasons at the club, successively backing up two fellow youth products, Pedro Alba and José María Ceballos.

In his last season with Racing, 1989–90, with the side now in the second division, Liaño only played once in the league, also being relegated. He then transferred to another club in the third level, Sestao Sport Club, where he won his first Ricardo Zamora Trophy, conceding only 28 goals in 38 games as the team finished in eighth position.

=== Deportivo ===
Liaño signed for Deportivo de La Coruña in the summer of 1991. Initially he was a backup to Juan Canales, but the latter suffered an injury prior to the start of the season and Liaño played the opening ten matches of the campaign. Both went down with injury later in the season, which prompted third-choice Yosu's promotion to starting duties for 11 contests.

Although Canales returned to finish the campaign as number one, he again suffered an injury prior to 1992–93, which gave Liaño another chance in the first team. Now, the team's performances were such that he never lost his status again, winning two consecutive Zamora as Deportivo qualified for the UEFA Cup for the first time in its history, after finishing third. In the following year, he set a first division record by conceding only 18 goals in 38 games – the lowest goals-to-games ratio in the league's history (along with Jan Oblak in 2015–16 season) – and won his second individual trophy, but the Galicians finished second behind free-scoring FC Barcelona on goal difference. In this season, he also became the most goalkeeper to achieve a clean sheet in one season in the history of La Liga, with 26 clean sheets (alongside Marc-André ter Stegen in 2022–23 season).

Liaño missed three months of the 1994–95 season through injury, but he was able to help Deportivo win the Copa del Rey, the first trophy in the club's history. John Toshack was named as Deportivo's new manager for 1995–96, and he named Canales as his first-choice; after he conceded ten goals in the first seven matches, the Welsh coach decided to reinstate Liaño, who finished the campaign as Depor ranked ninth.

=== Later years ===
Following the arrivals of Petr Kouba and Jacques Songo'o in the summer of 1996, 31-year-old Liaño joined Sporting de Gijón on a free transfer. He spent two seasons with the Asturias club before retiring, but he made only two league appearances, being barred by legendary Juan Carlos Ablanedo.
