= 1997–98 Deportivo de La Coruña season =

Deportivo de La Coruña
1997–98 season
- President: Augusto César Lendoiro
- Manager: Carlos Alberto Silva (until 15 October); José Manuel Corral (from 18 October)
- Stadium: Estadio Riazor
- La Liga: 12th
- Copa del Rey: Quarter-finals
- UEFA Cup: First round
- Top goalscorer: League: Djalminha (8); All: Djalminha (10)
Home colours	Away colours	Third colours

Deportivo La Coruña's 1997–98 season included its 33rd appearance in La Liga, where it ranked in 12th place. The club also competed in the Copa del Rey and the UEFA Cup.

== Summary ==
1997–98 was to be the first full season in charge for Brazilian coach Carlos Alberto Silva, who had taken over from John Toshack following the Welshman's resignation in February. Silva had a strong start, guiding Deportivo to 3rd in La Liga by the end of the season, and earning them a return to European competition after a year away by qualifying for the 1997–98 UEFA Cup. Their first round opponents were Auxerre, but a 2–1 defeat at Estadio Riazor followed by a goalless draw in France saw Depor eliminated before the end of September.

Deportivo were also far from convincing in La Liga, and a 3–1 home defeat by Real Valladolid on 15 October left them 15th in the table, with just one win from their first six matches. Silva was sacked, and replaced by José Manuel Corral until the end of the season. Corral improved the club's league form slightly, but they were only able to finish the season a disappointing 12th, their lowest placing since 1991–92. They did reach the quarter-finals of the Copa del Rey, but were defeated 3–1 on aggregate by Segunda División side Alavés.

Corral made way at the end of the season for Javier Irureta, paving the way for the most successful period of the club's history. Irureta would lead them to their first top flight title only two seasons later.

== Players ==
=== Squad ===
Note: Flags indicate national team as defined under FIFA eligibility rules; some limited exceptions apply. Players may hold more than one non-FIFA nationality.

No.	Pos.	Nation	Player
2	DF	ESP	Armando Álvarez
3	DF	POR	Hélder
4	DF	MAR	Noureddine Naybet
5	MF	BRA	Djalminha
6	MF	BRA	Mauro Silva
7	FW	ESP	Javier Manjarín
8	MF	MAR	Mustapha Hadji
10	MF	ESP	Fran (captain)
11	FW	URU	Sergio Martínez
12	MF	ARG	Lionel Scaloni
13	GK	CMR	Jacques Songo'o
14	DF	ESP	Paco Jémez
16	MF	BRA	Flávio Conceição
18	FW	MAR	Salaheddine Bassir
19	DF	ESP	Luis Miguel Ramis

No.	Pos.	Nation	Player
20	MF	ESP	Donato
21	DF	FRA	Jérôme Bonnissel
23	FW	URU	Sebastián Abreu
25	GK	NGA	Peter Rufai
28	GK	ESP	Dani Mallo
29	DF	ESP	José Manuel Aira
30	FW	ESP	Deus
31	MF	ESP	Carlos Padín
32	FW	ESP	Maikel
33	DF	ESP	Pablo Pinillos
34	MF	ESP	Diego Pérez Míguez
35	DF	ESP	Toni
1	GK	POR	Nuno Espírito Santo
24	FW	VEN	Carlos García

==== Left club during season ====
Note: Flags indicate national team as defined under FIFA eligibility rules; some limited exceptions apply. Players may hold more than one non-FIFA nationality.

No.	Pos.	Nation	Player
8	MF	FRA	Corentin Martins (to Strasbourg)
9	FW	BRA	Luizão (to Vasco da Gama)
15	MF	ESP	Alfredo Santaelena (to Sevilla)

No.	Pos.	Nation	Player
17	DF	ESP	Nando (to Sevilla)
22	FW	FRA	Mickaël Madar (to Everton)
26	FW	ESP	David Fernández (on loan to Sevilla)

==== Out on loan for the full season ====
Note: Flags indicate national team as defined under FIFA eligibility rules; some limited exceptions apply. Players may hold more than one non-FIFA nationality.

No. / Pos. / Nation / Player; 27 / MF / ESP / Emilio Viqueira (on loan at Campomaiorense)	No. / Pos. / Nation / Player; — / FW / BRA / Renaldo (on loan at Corinthians)

=== Transfers ===
==== In ====
#	Pos	Player	From	Notes
Summer
5	MF	(Brazil) Djalminha	(Brazil) Palmeiras	
9	FW	(Brazil) Luizão	(Brazil) Palmeiras	
18	FW	(Morocco) Salaheddine Bassir	(Saudi Arabia) Al Hilal	
19	DF	(Spain) Luis Miguel Ramis	(Spain) Sevilla	
25	GK	(Nigeria) Peter Rufai	(Spain) Hércules	
Winter
8	MF	(Morocco) Mustapha Hadji	(Portugal) Sporting CP	
11	FW	(Uruguay) Sergio Martínez	(Argentina) Boca Juniors	
12	MF	(Argentina) Lionel Scaloni	(Argentina) Estudiantes	405 million Pta
23	FW	(Uruguay) Sebastián Abreu	(Argentina) San Lorenzo	
26	FW	(Spain) David Fernández	(Spain) Sevilla	Loan return

==== Out ====
#	Pos	Player	To	Notes
Summer
1	GK	(Czech Republic) Petr Kouba	(Germany) 1. FC Kaiserslautern	
5	DF	(Federal Republic of Yugoslavia) Miroslav Đukić	(Spain) Valencia	Free
11	FW	(Brazil) Rivaldo	(Spain) Barcelona	4 billion Pta ($26 million)
18	FW	(Spain) Txiki Begiristain	(Japan) Urawa Red Diamonds	
19	DF	(Spain) José Luis Ribera	(Spain) Rayo Vallecano	
21	MF	(Spain) Rafael Martín Vázquez	(Mexico) Atlético Celaya	
22	FW	(Brazil) Renaldo	(Brazil) Corinthians	Loan
26	FW	(Spain) David Fernández	(Spain) Sevilla	Loan
27	MF	(Spain) Emilio Viqueira	(Portugal) Campomaiorense	Loan
Winter
8	MF	(France) Corentin Martins	(France) Strasbourg	
9	FW	(Brazil) Luizão	(Brazil) Vasco da Gama	
15	MF	(Spain) Alfredo Santaelena	(Spain) Sevilla	
17	DF	(Spain) Nando	(Spain) Sevilla	
22	FW	(France) Mickaël Madar	(England) Everton	Free

=== Statistics ===
Last updated on 14 April 2021.

No.	Pos	Nat	Player	Total		La Liga		Copa del Rey		UEFA Cup	
No.	Pos	Nat	Player	Apps	Goals	Apps	Goals	Apps	Goals	Apps	Goals
13	GK	(Cameroon) CMR	Jacques Songo'o	36	0	31	0	3	0	2	0
2	DF	(Spain) ESP	Armando Álvarez	36	2	31+1	2	2	0	2	0
4	DF	(Morocco) MAR	Noureddine Naybet	33	4	31	4	0	0	2	0
14	DF	(Spain) ESP	Paco Jémez	34	0	28+1	0	4	0	1	0
21	DF	(France) FRA	Jérôme Bonnissel	33	0	26+1	0	4	0	2	0
10	MF	(Spain) ESP	Fran	40	4	35	4	3	0	2	0
6	MF	(Brazil) BRA	Mauro Silva	34	0	30+1	0	1	0	2	0
16	MF	(Brazil) BRA	Flávio Conceição	31	3	26+1	3	2	0	2	0
20	MF	(Spain) ESP	Donato	33	2	22+8	1	3	1	0	0
5	MF	(Brazil) BRA	Djalminha	31	10	26	8	3	1	2	1
18	FW	(Morocco) MAR	Salaheddine Bassir	24	6	13+8	5	2	1	1	0
25	GK	(Nigeria) NGA	Peter Rufai	9	0	6+2	0	1	0	0	0
12	MF	(Argentina) ARG	Lionel Scaloni	22	2	18	2	3+1	0	0	0
3	DF	(Portugal) POR	Hélder	19	1	13+2	1	3	0	1	0
23	FW	(Uruguay) URU	Sebastián Abreu	18	4	12+3	3	3	1	0	0
19	DF	(Spain) ESP	Luis Miguel Ramis	22	1	11+7	1	4	0	0	0
8	MF	(Morocco) MAR	Mustapha Hadji	10	0	8+2	0	0	0	0	0
7	FW	(Spain) ESP	Javier Manjarín	8	0	7+1	0	0	0	0	0
33	DF	(Spain) ESP	Pablo Pinillos	9	0	4+3	0	0+2	0	0	0
32	FW	(Spain) ESP	Maikel	10	1	3+7	1	0	0	0	0
11	FW	(Uruguay) URU	Sergio Martínez	6	0	1+2	0	3	0	0	0
28	GK	(Spain) ESP	Dani Mallo	0	0	0	0	0	0	0	0
29	DF	(Spain) ESP	José Manuel Aira	1	0	1	0	0	0	0	0
30	FW	(Spain) ESP	Deus	8	0	0+5	0	0+1	0	0+2	0
31	MF	(Spain) ESP	Carlos Padín	2	0	1+1	0	0	0	0	0
34	MF	(Spain) ESP	Diego Pérez Míguez	0	0	0	0	0	0	0	0
35	DF	(Spain) ESP	Toni	1	0	0+1	0	0	0	0	0
1	GK	(Portugal) POR	Nuno Espírito Santo	1	0	1	0	0	0	0	0
24	FW	(Venezuela) VEN	Carlos García	7	1	1+6	1	0	0	0	0
Players who have left the club after the start of the season:
8	MF	(France) FRA	Corentin Martins	4	0	3	0	0	0	1	0
9	FW	(Brazil) BRA	Luizão	15	4	13	4	0	0	2	0
15	MF	(Spain) ESP	Alfredo Santaelena	10	0	3+7	0	0	0	0	0
17	DF	(Spain) ESP	Nando	9	0	6+3	0	0	0	0	0
22	FW	(France) FRA	Mickaël Madar	7	3	3+4	3	0	0	0	0
26	FW	(Spain) ESP	David Fernández	13	0	4+7	0	0+2	0	0	0

== Competitions ==
=== La Liga ===
==== League table ====
Pos	Team	Pld	W	D	L	GF	GA	GD	Pts	Qualification or relegation
10	Espanyol	38	12	17	9	44	31	+13	53	Qualification for the Intertoto Cup second round
11	Valladolid	38	13	11	14	36	47	−11	50	
12	Deportivo La Coruña	38	12	13	13	44	46	−2	49	
13	Zaragoza	38	12	12	14	45	53	−8	48	
14	Racing Santander	38	12	9	17	46	55	−9	45 (Note: RAC: 8 pts; SAL: 4 pts → SAL 2-0 TEN; TEN: 4 pts → TEN 2-0 SAL)	

Source: LFP
Rules for classification: 1) points; 2) head-to-head points; 3) head-to-head goal difference; 4) head-to-head goals scored; 5) goal difference; 6) number of goals scored.

==== Positions by round ====
Team ╲ Round	1	2	3	4	5	6	7	8	9	10	11	12	13	14	15	16	17	18	19	20	21	22	23	24	25	26	27	28	29	30	31	32	33	34	35	36	37	38
Deportivo La Coruña	12	13	16	11	11	15	14	14	15	16	12	13	15	14	14	15	17	17	17	14	14	14	11	12	13	12	14	13	14	11	13	12	12	11	12	13	13	12

Play-off relegation to 1998–99 Segunda División

Source: LFP 1-4 5-8 9-12 13-16 17-20

==== Matches ====
31 August 1997 1	Tenerife	0 – 0	Deportivo La Coruña	Santa Cruz de Tenerife, Spain
	Felipe Miñambres (yellow card); Jokanović (yellow card); Juanele (yellow card); Makaay (yellow card); Robaina (yellow card)	Report	(yellow card) Conceição; (yellow card) Nando	Stadium: Heliodoro Rodríguez López; Referee: Celino Gracia Redondo

7 September 1997 2	Deportivo La Coruña	1 – 1	Mallorca	A Coruña, Spain
	Campo 44' (o.g.); Nando (yellow card); Naybet (yellow card); Ramis (yellow card)	Report	43' Moya; (yellow card) Campo; (yellow card) Olaizola; (yellow card) Stanković	Stadium: Estadio Riazor; Referee: Alfonso Pérez

13 September 1997 3	Barcelona	2 – 1	Deportivo La Coruña	Barcelona, Spain
	Enrique 23'; Anderson 87'; Nadal (yellow card); Sergi (yellow card)	Report	89' Luizão; (yellow card) Fran	Stadium: Camp Nou; Referee: Arturo Daudén Ibáñez

27 September 1997 4	Deportivo La Coruña	4 – 1	Racing Santander	A Coruña, Spain
	Luizão 31', 67' (pen.) (yellow card); Djalminha 43' (pen.) (red card); Conceição 87'; Silva (yellow card)	Report	17' Beschastnykh; (yellow card) Ceballos; (yellow card) Merino; (yellow card) Sánchez Jara	Stadium: Estadio Riazor; Referee: Manuel Mejuto González

5 October 1997 5	Real Madrid	0 – 0	Deportivo La Coruña	Madrid, Spain
	Carlos (yellow card); Karanka (yellow card); Seedorf (yellow card)	Report	(yellow card) Jémez; (yellow card) Luizão; (yellow card) Naybet; (yellow card) Songo'o	Stadium: Santiago Bernabéu; Referee: Manuel Díaz Vega

15 October 1997 6	Deportivo La Coruña	1 – 3	Real Valladolid	A Coruña, Spain
	Hélder 3'; Luizão (yellow card); Naybet (yellow card)	Report	14' (pen.), 28' Peternac; 33' Víctor; (yellow card) Carlos; (yellow card) Gutiérrez; (yellow card) Manga; (yellow card) Quevedo	Stadium: Estadio Riazor; Referee: José Victor Esquinas Torres

18 October 1997 7	Athletic Bilbao	1 – 1	Deportivo La Coruña	Bilbao, Spain
	González 54'; Ríos (yellow card)	Report	69' Naybet; (yellow card) Djalminha; (yellow card) Luizão	Stadium: San Mamés; Referee: Juan Ansuátegui Roca

25 October 1997 8	Deportivo La Coruña	1 – 1	Celta Vigo	A Coruña, Spain
	Luizão 31' (yellow card); Armando Álvarez (yellow card); Fran (yellow card); Naybet (yellow card); Silva (yellow card)	Report	37' (yellow card) Salinas; (yellow card) Mostovoi; (yellow card) Revivo	Stadium: Estadio Riazor; Referee: Juan Brito Arceo

2 November 1997 9	Real Oviedo	1 – 1	Deportivo La Coruña	Oviedo, Spain
	Rivas 53' (yellow card); Berto (yellow card); Onopko (yellow card)	Report	89' Madar; (yellow card) Conceição; (yellow card) Hélder	Stadium: Estadio Carlos Tartiere; Referee: José Luis Prados García

9 November 1997 10	Deportivo La Coruña	0 – 1	Mérida	A Coruña, Spain
	Bonnissel (yellow card); Fran (yellow card); Jémez (yellow card); Naybet (yellow card) (yellow-red card)	Report	84' Gabrich; (yellow card) Momparlet	Stadium: Estadio Riazor; Referee: Juan Fernández Marín

12 November 1997 11	Real Zaragoza	1 – 2	Deportivo La Coruña	Zaragoza, Spain
	Yordi 51'; Gilmar (yellow card)	Report	17' Djalminha; 89' Fran; (yellow card) Bonnissel; (yellow card) Manjarín	Stadium: La Romareda; Referee: Eduardo Iturralde González

16 November 1997 12	Deportivo La Coruña	1 – 1	Espanyol	A Coruña, Spain
	Donato 13' (yellow card); Armando Álvarez (yellow card); Hélder (yellow card); Maikel (yellow card); Naybet (yellow card)	Report	5' Arteaga; (yellow card) (yellow-red card) Gâlcă; (yellow card) Pacheta; (yellow card) Pochettino	Stadium: Estadio Riazor; Referee: Carlos Megía Dávila

23 November 1997 13	Real Betis	1 – 0	Deportivo La Coruña	Seville, Spain
	Alexis Trujillo 72' (pen.); Jaime (yellow card); Olías (yellow card); Vidaković (yellow card)	Report	(yellow card) Armando Álvarez; (yellow card) (yellow-red card) Djalminha; (yellow card) Jémez	Stadium: Estadio Manuel Ruiz de Lopera; Referee: José Manuel Andradas Asurmendi

30 November 1997 14	Deportivo La Coruña	2 – 2	Atlético Madrid	A Coruña, Spain
	Madar 39'; Naybet 85'; Armando Álvarez (yellow card); Donato (yellow card)	Report	8' Lardín; 80' (yellow card) Andrei Frascarelli; (yellow card) Aguilera; (yellow card) Bejbl; (yellow card) Prodan	Stadium: Estadio Riazor; Referee: Luis Ruiz Campo

7 December 1997 15	Salamanca	4 – 1	Deportivo La Coruña	Villares de la Reina, Spain
	Pauleta 65', 70', 89'; Brito 79'	Report	16' Madar; (yellow card) Armando Álvarez; (red card) Hélder	Stadium: Helmántico Stadium; Referee: Fernando Carmona Méndez

14 December 1997 16	Deportivo La Coruña	1 – 1	Real Sociedad	A Coruña, Spain
	Fran 8'; Luizão (yellow card)	Report	42' (yellow card) Gracia; (yellow card) Adepoju; (yellow card) de Pedro; (yellow card) Gómez; (yellow card) Imaz	Stadium: Estadio Riazor; Referee: Celino Gracia Redondo

18 December 1997 17	Valencia	1 – 0	Deportivo La Coruña	Valencia, Spain
	Vlaović 54'; Farinós (yellow card); Ortega (yellow card)	Report	(yellow card) Naybet; (yellow card) Ramis; (yellow card) Silva	Stadium: Mestalla; Referee: Manuel Mejuto González

21 December 1997 18	Compostela	0 – 0	Deportivo La Coruña	Santiago de Compostela, Spain
	Chiba (yellow card); Passi (yellow card)	Report	(yellow card) Bassir; (yellow card) Bonnissel; (yellow card) Jémez; (yellow card) Madar	Stadium: Estadio Multiusos de San Lázaro; Referee: José Losantos Omar

4 January 1998 19	Deportivo La Coruña	2 – 1	Sporting de Gijón	A Coruña, Spain
	Naybet 70' (yellow card); Abreu 85'; Fran (yellow card); Silva (yellow card); Songo'o (red card)	Report	24' Fernández; (yellow card) Mingo; (yellow card) Nikiforov; (yellow card) Tomás Hervás; (yellow card) Trotta; (yellow card) Villarroya	Stadium: Estadio Riazor; Referee: Arturo Daudén Ibáñez

11 January 1998 20	Deportivo La Coruña	1 – 0	Tenerife	A Coruña, Spain
	Djalminha 87'; Silva (yellow card)	Report	(yellow card) Paz; (yellow card) Slovák	Stadium: Estadio Riazor; Referee: Manuel Mejuto González

18 January 1998 21	Mallorca	0 – 0	Deportivo La Coruña	Palma de Mallorca, Spain
	Campo (yellow card)	Report	(yellow card) Conceição; (yellow card) Pinillos	Stadium: Lluís Sitjar; Referee: Juan Ansuátegui Roca

25 January 1998 22	Deportivo La Coruña	3 – 1	Barcelona	A Coruña, Spain
	Fran 3' (yellow card) (yellow-red card); Abreu 75'; Djalminha 84' (yellow card)	Report	85' (o.g.) Donato; (yellow card) Sergi	Stadium: Estadio Riazor; Referee: José Manuel Andradas Asurmendi

1 February 1998 23	Racing Santander	0 – 1	Deportivo La Coruña	Santander, Spain
	Abeijón (yellow card); López (yellow card); Sietes (yellow card)	Report	55' (yellow card) Scaloni; (yellow card) Abreu; (yellow card) Armando Álvarez; (yellow card) Conceição; (yellow card) Naybet	Stadium: El Sardinero; Referee: Juan Fernández Marín

8 February 1998 24	Deportivo La Coruña	2 – 2	Real Madrid	A Coruña, Spain
	Fran 10'; Djalminha 21' (yellow card); Armando Álvarez (yellow card); Jémez (yellow card); Ramis (red card); Scaloni (yellow card)	Report	19' Víctor Sánchez; 78' (yellow card) Morientes; (yellow card) Jaime	Stadium: Estadio Riazor; Referee: Juan Brito Arceo

14 February 1998 25	Real Valladolid	1 – 0	Deportivo La Coruña	Valladolid, Spain
	Peternac 52'; Klimowicz (yellow card); Lozano (yellow card); Peña (yellow card); Santamaría (yellow card)	Report	(yellow card) Armando Álvarez; (yellow card) Fernández; (yellow card) Pinillos	Stadium: José Zorrilla; Referee: Miguel Pérez Lasa

22 February 1998 26	Deportivo La Coruña	3 – 0	Athletic Bilbao	A Coruña, Spain
	Armando Álvarez 56' (yellow card); Maikel 59'; García 85'; Conceição (yellow card)	Report	(yellow card) Nagore	Stadium: Estadio Riazor; Referee: Celino Gracia Redondo

1 March 1998 27	Celta Vigo	2 – 1	Deportivo La Coruña	Vigo, Spain
	Mostovoi 70' (yellow card); Ramis 72' (o.g.); Ito (yellow card); Mazinho (yellow card); Sánchez (yellow card); Vales (yellow card)	Report	6' Ramis; (yellow card) Abreu; (yellow card) Naybet	Stadium: Balaídos; Referee: Manuel Díaz Vega

8 March 1998 28	Deportivo La Coruña	2 – 1	Real Oviedo	A Coruña, Spain
	Abreu 31'; Djalminha 83'	Report	65' González; (yellow card) Bento; (yellow card) Dely Valdés; (yellow card) Gamboa; (yellow card) Manel; (yellow card) Pompei	Stadium: Estadio Riazor; Referee: José Japón Sevilla

15 March 1998 29	Mérida	1 – 0	Deportivo La Coruña	Mérida, Spain
	Cléber Arado 31' (yellow card); Hoyas (yellow card); Molina (yellow card); Ruano (yellow card); Sabas (yellow card); Sierra (yellow card)	Report	(yellow card) Abreu; (yellow card) Armando Álvarez; (yellow card) Conceição; (yellow card) Pinillos; (red card) Songo'o	Stadium: Estadio Romano; Referee: José Victor Esquinas Torres

22 March 1998 30	Deportivo La Coruña	2 – 1	Real Zaragoza	A Coruña, Spain
	Conceição 8'; Bassir 66' (yellow card); Abreu (yellow card)	Report	80' Aguado; (yellow card) Sundgren	Stadium: Estadio Riazor; Referee: Juan Ansuátegui Roca

29 March 1998 31	Espanyol	2 – 0	Deportivo La Coruña	Barcelona, Spain
	Esnáider 17' (pen.); Pralija 62'; Cobos (yellow card); Gâlcă (yellow card); Pochettino (yellow card)	Report	(yellow card) Naybet	Stadium: Estadi Olímpic de Montjuïc; Referee: Carmelo Rodríguez Martel

4 April 1998 32	Deportivo La Coruña	2 – 0	Real Betis	A Coruña, Spain
	Djalminha 52' (yellow card); Bassir 80' (yellow card); Conceição (yellow card)	Report	(yellow card) Cuéllar; (yellow card) (yellow-red card) Olías	Stadium: Estadio Riazor; Referee: Carlos Megía Dávila

11 April 1998 33	Atlético Madrid	3 – 0	Deportivo La Coruña	Madrid, Spain
	Mari 2'; Jémez 20' (o.g.); Santi 44' (pen.) (yellow card); Andrei Frascarelli (yellow card); Pantić (yellow card); Ramón (yellow card)	Report	(yellow card) Abreu; (yellow card) Armando Álvarez; (yellow card) Ramis; (yellow card) Scaloni	Stadium: Vicente Calderón; Referee: José Luis Prados García

19 April 1998 34	Deportivo La Coruña	1 – 0	Salamanca	A Coruña, Spain
	Bassir 58'; Scaloni (yellow card)	Report	(yellow card) Pavličić	Stadium: Estadio Riazor; Referee: Miguel Pérez Lasa

27 April 1998 35	Real Sociedad	1 – 1	Deportivo La Coruña	San Sebastián, Spain
	Cvitanović 50' de Paula (yellow card); Mild (yellow card)	Report	24' Armando Álvarez; (yellow card) Bonnissel; (yellow card) Djalminha	Stadium: Anoeta; Referee: Antonio López Nieto

2 May 1998 36	Deportivo La Coruña	1 – 2	Valencia	A Coruña, Spain
	Scaloni 81'; Bassir (yellow card); Silva (yellow card)	Report	65' (pen.), 89' Mendieta; (yellow card) Carboni	Stadium: Estadio Riazor; Referee: José María García-Aranda

10 May 1998 37	Deportivo La Coruña	2 – 6	Compostela	A Coruña, Spain
	Naybet 36' (yellow card); Djalminha 39' (pen.); Abreu (yellow card); Fran (yellow card); Scaloni (yellow card)	Report	16', 50', 55' Sion; 32' Bellido; 52' Fabiano; 73' Juan Viedma; (yellow card) Nacho	Stadium: Estadio Riazor; Referee: Eduardo Iturralde González

16 May 1998 38	Sporting de Gijón	0 – 3	Deportivo La Coruña	Gijón, Spain
	Kaiku (yellow card); Mingo (yellow card); Otero (yellow card)	Report	5', 55' Bassir; 89' Conceição; (yellow card) Donato; (yellow card) (yellow-red card) Naybet	Stadium: El Molinón; Referee: Fernando Carmona Méndez

=== Copa del Rey ===
Win Draw Loss

Round	Opponent	Aggregate	First leg			Second leg		
Round	Opponent	Aggregate	Venue	Result	Ref	Venue	Result	Ref
Round of 16	Osasuna	3–1	A	1–0		H	2–1	
Quarter-finals	Alavés	1–3	A	1–3		H	0–0	

=== UEFA Cup ===
==== First round ====
16 September 1997 First leg	Deportivo La Coruña (Spain)	1 – 2	(France) Auxerre	A Coruña, Spain
21:00	Djalminha 87'; Luizão (yellow card) 26'; Armando Álvarez (yellow card) 64'; Silva (yellow card) 87'	Report 1 Report 2	72' Diomède; 84' Guivarc'h; (yellow card) 24' Goma; (yellow card) 40' Lamouchi; (yellow card) 60' Sibierski	Stadium: Estadio Riazor; Attendance: 24,000; Referee: Georg Dardenne (Germany)

30 September 1997 Second leg	Auxerre (France)	0 – 0	(Spain) Deportivo La Coruña	Auxerre, France
20:00	Ciechelski (yellow card) 30'; Silvestre (yellow card) 88'	Report 1 Report 2	(yellow card) 24' Conceição; (yellow card) 57' Armando Álvarez; (yellow card) 68' Jémez	Stadium: Stade Abbé-Deschamps; Attendance: 18,000; Referee: Nikolai Levnikov (Russia)

Auxerre won 2–1 on aggregate
