= 1998–99 Deportivo de La Coruña season =

Deportivo de La Coruña
1998–99 season
- President: Cesar Lendoiro
- Manager: Javier Irureta
- Stadium: Estadio Riazor
- La Liga: 6th
- Copa del Rey: Semifinals
Home colours	Away colours	Third colours

During the 1998–99 season, Deportivo de La Coruña competed in La Liga and Copa del Rey.

== Summary ==
Deportivo La Coruña's 1998–99 season included its 29th appearance in La Liga, where it ranked sixth. In the Copa del Rey the team reached the semifinals for the first time since its 1995 title. On the other hand, the team didn't appear in European competitions, for the last time until the 2006–07 season. It was the first season under manager Javier Irureta, who would lead the club highly successfully until 2005.

== Squad ==
Source: BdFútbol
Note: Flags indicate national team as defined under FIFA eligibility rules; some limited exceptions apply. Players may hold more than one non-FIFA nationality.

No.	Pos.	Nation	Player
1	GK	CMR	Jacques Songo'o
2	DF	ESP	Armando Álvarez
3	DF	ESP	Enrique Romero
4	DF	MAR	Noureddine Naybet
5	DF	ARG	Gabriel Schürrer
6	MF	BRA	Mauro Silva
7	DF	ESP	Javier Manjarín
8	MF	BRA	Djalminha
9	FW	POR	Pauleta
10	DF	ESP	Fran González
11	FW	ARG	José Óscar Flores
12	DF	ARG	Lionel Scaloni
13	GK	CZE	Petr Kouba
14	FW	MAR	Salaheddine Bassir

No.	Pos.	Nation	Player
15	MF	MAR	Mustapha Hadji
16	MF	BRA	Flávio Conceição
17	DF	ESP	Manuel Pablo García
18	MF	FRA	Stéphane Ziani
19	DF	ESP	Luis Miguel Ramis
20	MF	ESP	Donato
21	DF	FRA	Jérôme Bonnissel
22	DF	POR	Hélder Cristóvão
23	MF	ESP	José Ramón González
24	DF	ESP	Javi López
25	GK	NGA	Peter Rufai
26	MF	SUI	Gerardo Seoane
27	DF	ESP	José Manuel Aira

=== Transfers ===
In
Pos.	Name	from	Type
DF	Enrique Romero	Mallorca	-
DF	Gabriel Schürrer	Racing Santander	-
MF	Stéphane Ziani	Lens	
FW	Turu Flores	Las Palmas	-
FW	Pedro Pauleta	Salamanca	
GK	Petr Kouba	1.FC Kaiserslautern	-
FW	Helder	Benfica	-
DF	Manuel Pablo	Las Palmas	-
MF	José Ramón	Compostela	-
FW	Dmitri Radchenko	Mérida	-
MF	Gerardo Seoane	Sion	-

Out
Pos.	Name	To	Type
DF	Paco Jémez	Real Zaragoza	-
FW	Sebastián Abreu	Gremio	loan
GK	Dani Mallo	Deportivo La Coruña B	-
FW	Deus	Hércules	-
MF	Carlos Padín	Deportivo La Coruña B	-
FW	Maikel	Toledo	-
DF	Pablo Pinillos	Deportivo La Coruña B	-
DF	Toni	Benidorm	-
GK	Nuno Espírito Santo	Mérida	-
FW	Carlos García	Deportivo La Coruña B	-
MF	Corentin Martins	Strasbourg	-
FW	Luizão	Vasco da Gama	-
MF	Alfredo Santaelena	Sevilla	-
DF	Nando	Sevilla	-
FW	Mickaël Madar	Paris Saint-Germain	-
FW	David Fernández	Deportivo La Coruña B	-
FW	Dmitri Radchenko	Compostela	-

=== Unsuccessful attempts ===
- Deportivo was close to signing Barcelona's Juan Antonio Pizzi, but the player decided to return to the Argentine Primera División after River Plate rose its initial offer to match Deportivo's, as explained by Pizzi's agent Ricardo Schliepper on June 30.

== Competitions ==
=== La Liga ===
==== League table ====
Pos	Team	Pld	W	D	L	GF	GA	GD	Pts	Qualification or relegation
4	Valencia	38	19	8	11	63	39	+24	65	Qualification for the Champions League third qualifying round
5	Celta Vigo	38	17	13	8	69	41	+28	64	Qualification for the UEFA Cup first round
6	Deportivo La Coruña	38	17	12	9	55	43	+12	63	Qualification for the UEFA Cup first round
7	Espanyol	38	16	13	9	49	38	+11	61	Qualification for the Intertoto Cup third round
8	Athletic Bilbao (Note: Despite being qualified and registered, Athletic Bilbao refused to play Intertoto)	38	17	9	12	53	47	+6	60	

Source: LFP
Rules for classification: 1) points; 2) head-to-head points; 3) head-to-head goal difference; 4) head-to-head goals scored; 5) goal difference; 6) number of goals scored.

==== Results by round ====
Round	1	2	3	4	5	6	7	8	9	10	11	12	13	14	15	16	17	18	19	20	21	22	23	24	25	26	27	28	29	30	31	32	33	34	35	36	37	38
Ground	A	H	A	H	A	H	A	H	A	H	A	H	A	H	A	H	H	A	H	H	A	H	A	H	A	H	A	H	A	H	A	H	A	H	A	A	H	A
Result	D	W	L	W	L	W	D	D	D	D	W	W	W	L	D	L	L	W	W	W	D	W	D	L	W	W	W	D	L	W	W	L	D	W	W	D	D	L
Position	15	6	12	6	9	7	6	7	8	11	7	5	2	5	5	8	12	9	7	6	6	6	4	5	5	5	4	5	6	5	4	6	6	6	5	6	5	6

Source: https://www.worldfootball.net/competition/ro11027/md38/results-and-standings/
A = Away; H = Home; W = Win; D = Draw; L = Loss; = Leader, 1999–2000 UEFA Champions League group stage; = 1999–2000 UEFA Champions League group stage; = 1999–2000 UEFA Champions League qualifying round; = 1999–2000 UEFA Cup; = 1999–2000 Segunda División

==== Matches ====
30 August 1998 1	Celta Vigo	0-0	Deportivo

12 September 1998 2	Deportivo	1-0	Valencia	La Coruña
				Stadium: Riazor

20 September 1998 3	Salamanca	3-1	Deportivo

27 September 1998 4	Deportivo	1-0	Espanyol	La Coruña
				Stadium: Riazor

4 October 1998 5	Real Sociedad	2-0	Deportivo

18 October 1998 6	Deportivo	4-0	Real Oviedo	La Coruña
				Stadium: Riazor

25 October 1998 7	Tenerife	1-1	Deportivo

1 November 1998 8	Deportivo	1-1	Mallorca	La Coruña
				Stadium: Riazor

8 November 1998 9	Atlético Madrid	1-1	Deportivo

15 November 1998 10	Deportivo	2-2	Alavés	La Coruña
				Stadium: Riazor

22 November 1998 11	Deportivo	2-1	Villarreal	La Coruña
				Stadium: Riazor

29 November 1998 12	Real Valladolid	0-1	Deportivo

5 December 1998 13	Deportivo	2-1	Barcelona	La Coruña
				Stadium: Riazor

13 December 1998 14	Athletic Bilbao	2-1	Deportivo
		Report

19 December 1998 15	Deportivo	2-2	Real Betis	La Coruña
				Stadium: Riazor

3 January 1999 16	Real Zaragoza	3-1	Deportivo

10 January 1999 17	Deportivo	1-2	Racing Santander	La Coruña
				Stadium: Riazor

17 January 1999 18	Extremadura	1-2	Deportivo

24 January 1999 19	Deportivo	4-0	Real Madrid	La Coruña
		Report		Stadium: Riazor

31 January 1999 20	Deportivo	2-1	Celta Vigo	La Coruña
				Stadium: Riazor

6 February 1999 21	Valencia	0-0	Deportivo

13 February 1999 22	Deportivo	1-0	Salamanca	La Coruña
				Stadium: Riazor

21 February 1999 23	Espanyol	2-2	Deportivo

28 February 1999 24	Deportivo	0-1	Real Sociedad	La Coruña
		Report		Stadium: Riazor

6 March 1999 25	Real Oviedo	1-2	Deportivo

14 March 1999 26	Deportivo	2-0	Tenerife	La Coruña
		Report		Stadium: Riazor

21 March 1999 27	Mallorca	1-2	Deportivo
		Report

3 March 1999 28	Deportivo	1-1	Atlético Madrid	La Coruña
		Report		Stadium: Riazor

11 April 1999 29	Alavés	2-1	Deportivo
		Report

18 April 1999 30	Villarreal	1-2	Deportivo
		Report

25 April 1999 31	Deportivo	3-0	Real Valladolid	La Coruña
		Report		Stadium: Riazor

2 May 1999 32	Barcelona	2-1	Deportivo

9 May 1999 33	Deportivo	1-1	Athletic Bilbao	La Coruña
		Report		Stadium: Riazor

16 May 1999 34	Real Betis	0-3	Deportivo	Sevilla
		Report		Stadium: Benito Villamarin

23 May 1999 35	Deportivo	2-1	Real Zaragoza	La Coruña
		Report		Stadium: Riazor

30 May 1999 36	Racing Santander	1-1	Deportivo	Santander
		Report		Stadium: El Sardinero

6 June 1999 37	Deportivo	1-1	Extremadura	La Coruña
		Report		Stadium: Riazor

13 June 1999 38	Real Madrid	3-1	Deportivo	Madrid
		Report		Stadium: Santiago Bernabéu

=== Copa del Rey ===
==== Third round ====
28 October 1998	Jerez	1-3	Deportivo	Jerez

10 November 1998	Deportivo	3-1	Jerez	La Coruña
		Report		Stadium: Riazor

==== Fourth round ====
16 December 1998	Deportivo	1-1	Sporting Gijón	La Coruña
				Stadium: Riazor

13 January 1999	Sporting Gijón	0-1	Deportivo	Gijón
		Report		Stadium: El Molinon

==== Eight-finals ====
20 January 1999	Celta Vigo	0-1	Deportivo	Vigo
		Report		Stadium: Balaídos

3 February 1999	Deportivo	1-1	Celta Vigo	La Coruña
		Report		Stadium: Riazor

==== Quarter-finals ====
17 February 1999	Mallorca	1-1	Deportivo	Palma
		Report		Stadium: Son Moix

24 February 1999	Deportivo	1-0	Mallorca	La Coruña
		Report		Stadium: Riazor

==== Semi-finals ====
8 June 1999	Atlético Madrid	0-0	Deportivo	Madrid
		Report		Stadium: Vicente Calderón

15 June 1999	Deportivo	0-1	Atlético Madrid	La Coruña
		Report		Stadium: Riazor

== Statistics ==
=== Players statistics ===
No.	Pos	Nat	Player	Total		La Liga		Copa del Rey	
No.	Pos	Nat	Player	Apps	Goals	Apps	Goals	Apps	Goals
1	GK	(Cameroon) CMR	Songo'o	46	-46	37	-41	9	-5
4	DF	(Morocco) MAR	Naybet	35	1	29+1	1	5	0
5	DF	(Argentina) ARG	Schürrer	37	3	25+3	3	9	0
3	DF	(Spain) ESP	Romero	40	0	32+2	0	5+1	0
18	MF	(France) FRA	Ziani	42	6	33+3	6	5+1	0
6	MF	(Brazil) BRA	Mauro Silva	43	0	36	0	7	0
10	MF	(Spain) ESP	Fran	37	6	32	6	5	0
16	MF	(Brazil) BRA	Flávio Conceição	36	1	31	1	5	0
8	MF	(Brazil) BRA	Djalminha	35	9	26+4	8	5	1
11	FW	(Argentina) ARG	Turu Flores	44	17	30+6	14	6+2	3
9	FW	(Portugal) POR	Pauleta	37	11	22+6	10	3+6	1
25	GK	(Nigeria) NGA	Rufai	2	-3	1	-2	1	-1
2	DF	(Spain) ESP	Armando	29	0	22+5	0	1+1	0
20	MF	(Brazil) BRA	Donato	40	4	17+14	1	7+2	3
15	MF	(Morocco) MAR	Hadji	29	4	11+10	2	7+1	2
12	DF	(Argentina) ARG	Scaloni	30	0	8+13	0	8+1	0
17	DF	(Spain) ESP	Manuel Pablo	19	0	10+4	0	5	0
21	DF	(France) FRA	Bonnissel	22	0	5+11	0	5+1	0
19	DF	(Spain) ESP	Ramis	11	0	9+1	0	1	0
14	FW	(Morocco) MAR	Bassir	19	2	1+14	0	4	2
7	DF	(Spain) ESP	Manjarin	18	0	0+10	0	2+6	0
23	MF	(Spain) ESP	José Ramón	5	0	1	0	1+3	0
24	DF	(Spain) ESP	Javi López	3	0	0+1	0	2	0
13	GK	(Czech Republic) CZE	Kouba						
22	DF	(Portugal) POR	Helder						
26	MF	(Switzerland) SUI	Seoane	2	0	0	0	1+1	0
27	DF	(Spain) ESP	Aira	3	0	0	0	1+2	0

- Source: https://www.bdfutbol.com/en/t/t1998-9913.html?t=altas
