= 1996–97 Deportivo de La Coruña season =

Deportivo La Coruña
1996–97 season
- President: Augusto César Lendoiro
- Manager: John Toshack (until 10 February 1997); Carlos Alberto Silva
- Stadium: Estadio Riazor
- Primera División: 3rd (in UEFA Cup)
- Copa del Rey: Round of 16
- Top goalscorer: League: All: Rivaldo (21)
Home colours	Away colours

Deportivo La Coruña's 1996–97 season included its 32nd appearance in La Liga, where it ranked third place. Welsh manager John Toshack was replaced after 23 rounds by Brazilian head coach Carlos Alberto Silva.

== Summary ==
Deportivo placed third overall in La Liga finishing only below champions Real Madrid and runners-up Barcelona. Former Deportivo President Augusto César Lendoiro reached an agreement with Palmeiras for $7 million to acquire Rivaldo before the 1996 Olympic Games, instead of buying midfielder Amaral. On 10 February 1997 after the team was eliminated in Copa del Rey round of 16, Lendoiro fired John Toshack due to his interactions with club officials, players and fans. The Welsh manager was replaced by the Palmeiras coach Carlos Alberto Silva. On 9 September 1996, Deportivo signed Brazilian midfielder Flávio Conceição from Palmeiras.

== Squad ==
Source: BdFútbol
Note: Flags indicate national team as defined under FIFA eligibility rules; some limited exceptions apply. Players may hold more than one non-FIFA nationality.

No.	Pos.	Nation	Player
1	GK	CZE	Petr Kouba
2	DF	ESP	Armando Álvarez
3	DF	FRA	Jérôme Bonnissel
4	DF	MAR	Noureddine Naybet
5	DF	YUG	Miroslav Đukić
6	MF	BRA	Mauro Silva
7	FW	ESP	Javier Manjarín
8	MF	FRA	Corentin Martins
9	FW	FRA	Mickaël Madar
10	MF	ESP	Fran
11	FW	BRA	Rivaldo
13	GK	CMR	Jacques Songo'o
14	DF	ESP	Paco Jémez
15	MF	ESP	Alfredo Santaelena

No.	Pos.	Nation	Player
16	MF	BRA	Flávio Conceição
17	DF	ESP	Nando
18	FW	ESP	Aitor Begiristain
20	MF	BRA	Donato
21	MF	ESP	Martín Vázquez
22	FW	BRA	Renaldo
22	FW	POR	Hélder Cristóvão
24	GK	POR	Nuno
25	GK	ESP	Juan Canales
26	FW	ESP	David
27	MF	ESP	Emilio Viqueira
28	FW	ESP	José Luis Deus
30	FW	ESP	Maikel

=== Transfers ===
In
Pos.	Name	from	Type
FW	Rivaldo	Palmeiras	€12.0 million
GK	Jacques Songo'o	Metz	-
DF	Noureddine Naybet	Sporting CP	
FW	Corentin Martins	Auxerre	-
FW	Renaldo Lopes da Cruz	Atlético Mineiro	
GK	Petr Kouba	Sparta Prague	-
FW	Helder	Benfica	-
DF	Jérôme Bonnissel	Montpellier	-
FW	Mickaël Madar	Monaco	-
MF	Flávio Conceição	Palmeiras	-

Out
Pos.	Name	To	Type
FW	Bebeto	Flamengo	-
FW	Dmitri Radchenko	Sporting Gijón	-
GK	Francisco Liaño	Sporting Gijón	-
FW	Lopez Rekarte	Mallorca	-
DF	Villarroya	Sporting Gijón	-
GK	Agustin Elduayen	Real Valladolid	-

== Competitions ==
=== La Liga ===
==== League table ====
Pos	Team	Pld	W	D	L	GF	GA	GD	Pts	Qualification or relegation
1	Real Madrid (C)	42	27	11	4	85	36	+49	92	Qualification for the Champions League group stage
2	Barcelona	42	28	6	8	102	48	+54	90	Qualification for the Champions League second qualifying round
3	Deportivo La Coruña	42	21	14	7	57	30	+27	77 (Note: BET 1–2 DEP; DEP 3–0 BET)	Qualification for the UEFA Cup first round
4	Real Betis	42	21	14	7	81	46	+35	77	Qualification for the Cup Winners' Cup first round (Note: Since Barcelona, winners of 1996–97 Copa del Rey, was qualified for the 1997–98 UEFA Champions League, losing cup finalists Real Betis earned a spot in the first round of the 1997–98 UEFA Cup Winners' Cup.)
5	Atlético Madrid	42	20	11	11	76	64	+12	71	Qualification for the UEFA Cup first round

Source: LFP
Rules for classification: 1) points; 2) head-to-head points; 3) head-to-head goal difference; 4) head-to-head goals scored; 5) goal difference; 6) number of goals scored.
(C) Champions

==== Results by round ====
Round	1	2	3	4	5	6	7	8	9	10	11	12	13	14	15	16	17	18	19	20	21	22	23	24	25	26	27	28	29	30	31	32	33	34	35	36	37	38	39	40	41	42
Ground	A	H	A	H	A	H	A	H	A	H	A	H	H	A	H	A	H	A	H	A	H	H	A	H	A	H	A	H	A	H	A	H	A	A	H	A	H	A	H	A	H	A
Result	D	D	W	W	W	D	W	W	D	W	W	D	D	W	W	W	D	L	D	D	L	L	D	D	W	W	W	W	W	W	D	W	L	W	W	W	D	D	L	L	L	W
Position	13	15	8	4	2	4	2	3	3	3	3	3	3	3	3	2	3	3	4	4	4	5	5	5	5	5	5	4	4	4	4	4	4	4	4	4	3	3	4	4	4	3

Source: Competitive matches
A = Away; H = Home; W = Win; D = Draw; L = Loss; = Leader, 1997–98 UEFA Champions League Group stage; = 1997–98 UEFA Champions League Qualifying round; = 1997–98 UEFA Cup First round; = 1996–97 La Liga#Relegation playoff; = 1997–98 Segunda División; R = 1997–98 UEFA Cup Winners' Cup

==== Matches ====
31 August 1996 1	Deportivo La Coruña	1–1	Real Madrid	A Coruña
	Martins 22'; Armando (yellow card) 74' (yellow-red card); Donato (yellow card) 89' (yellow-red card); Djukic (yellow card)	Report	Roberto Carlos 78'; Milla (yellow card) 52' (yellow-red card)	Stadium: Estadio Riazor; Referee: Dauden Ibañez

8 September 1996 2	Celta Vigo	1 – 1	Deportivo La Coruña	Vigo
	Sánchez 85'	Report	17' (o.g.) Tárraga	Stadium: Balaídos; Referee: Celino Gracia Redondo

14 September 1996 3	Atlético Madrid	0-2	Deportivo La Coruña	Madrid
			53'Rivaldo; 74'Martins	Stadium: Vicente Calderón; Attendance: 30 000

22 September 1996 4	Deportivo	4-0	Hércules	A Coruña
	Rivaldo 5' (pen.); Rivaldo 44'; Martins 18'; Martín Vázquez 54'			Stadium: Riazor; Attendance: 25 000

28 September 1996 5	Real Betis	1–2	Deportivo La Coruña	Sevilla
	Jarni 2'		70' Rivaldo; 79' Madar	Stadium: Benito Villamarin; Attendance: 45 000

2 October 1996 6	Deportivo	1-1	Rayo Vallecano	A Coruña
	Manjarin 74'		65' Guilherme	Stadium: Riazor; Attendance: 22,000

13 October 1996 7	Real Oviedo	0-1	Deportivo	Oviedo
			89' Donato	Stadium: Carlos Tartiere; Attendance: 18,724

19 October 1996 8	Deportivo	2-0	Espanyol	A Coruña
	Rivaldo 48'; Madar 67'			Stadium: Riazor; Attendance: 25 000

23 October 1996 9	Racing Santander	1-1	Deportivo	Santander
	Correa 78'		50' Madar	Stadium: El Sardinero; Attendance: 16,000

27 October 1996 10	Deportivo	1-0	Real Sociedad	A Coruña
	Donato 19'			Stadium: Riazor; Attendance: 28,000

3 November 1996 11	Real Zaragoza	1-2	Deportivo	Zaragoza
	Poyet 29'		24' Beguiristain; 66' Martin Vazquez	Stadium: La Romareda; Attendance: 27,000

10 November 1996 12	Deportivo	0-0	Tenerife	A Coruña
				Stadium: Riazor; Attendance: 18,000

16 November 1996 13	Compostela	0-0	Deportivo	Santiago de Compostela
				Stadium: San Lázaro; Attendance: 9,000

24 November 1996 14	Deportivo	4–1	Logroñes	A Coruña
	Manjarin 29'; Rivaldo 32'; Martins 52'; Armando 79'		Castaño 40'	Stadium: Riazor

1 December 1996 15	Sevilla	0-1	Deportivo	Sevilla
			49' Martins	Stadium: Sanchez Pizjuan; Attendance: 42,800

8 December 1996 16	Deportivo	1-0	Valencia	A Coruña
	Martins 6'			Stadium: Riazor; Attendance: 22,000

22 December 1996 17	Sporting Gijón	1–1	Deportivo	Gijón
	Julio Salinas 22'		Rivaldo 9'	Stadium: El Molinon

4 January 1997 18	Deportivo La Coruña	0–1	Barcelona	A Coruña
	Nando (red card); Naybet (yellow card); Renaldo (yellow card)	Report	Pizzi 88'; Popescu (yellow card); Ferrer (yellow card); Amunike (yellow card)	Stadium: Estadio Riazor

12 January 1997 19	Real Valladolid	1–1	Deportivo	Valladolid
	Victor 10'		9'Rivaldo	Stadium: Estadio José Zorrilla

19 January 1996 20	Deportivo	2-2	Athletic Bilbao	A Coruña
	Donato 4' (pen.); Martins 44'		26' Ziganda; 87' Guerrero	Stadium: Riazor; Attendance: 22,000

25 January 1997 21	Extremadura	1-0	Deportivo	Almendralejo
	Silvani 61			Stadium: Francisco de la Hera; Attendance: 11,350

1 February 1997 22	Real Madrid	3–2	Deportivo La Coruña	Madrid
	Panucci 19'; Hierro 52'; Suker 65'	Report	15' Flavio Conceicao; 50' Martins	Stadium: Santiago Bernabéu

9 February 1997 23	Deportivo La Coruña	2 – 2	Celta Vigo	A Coruña
	Rivaldo 41'; Renaldo 54'	Report	20' Sánchez; 64' Mostovoi	Stadium: Estadio Riazor; Referee: José Manuel Andradas Asurmendi

15 February 1997 24	Deportivo La Coruña	0-0	Atlético Madrid	A Coruña
				Stadium: Riazor

19 February 1997 25	Hércules	1-3	Deportivo	Alicante
	Alfaro 19' (pen.)		28' Corentin Martins; 45' Rivaldo; 70' Martins	Stadium: Rico Pérez; Attendance: 15 000

23 February 1997 26	Deportivo	3–0	Real Betis	A Coruña
	Rivaldo 36'; Nando 39'; Rivaldo 59'	Report		Stadium: Estadio Riazor; Attendance: 22,000

1 March 1997 27	Rayo Vallecano	1-2	Deportivo	Madrid
	Klimowicz 79'		20' Rivaldo; 51' Martins	Stadium: Vallecas; Attendance: 15 000

9 March 1997 28	Deportivo	3-0	Real Oviedo	A Coruña
	Renaldo; Martins			Stadium: Riazor; Attendance: 28,000

15 March 1997 29	Espanyol	0–1	Deportivo	Barcelona
			37' Naybet	Attendance: 18,000

23 March 1997 30	Deportivo	2–1	Racing Santander	A Coruña
	Martins 30'; Renaldo 57'		44' Txema	Stadium: Riazor; Attendance: 22,000

29 March 1997 31	Real Sociedad	1–1	Deportivo	San Sebastián
	Aranzabal 25'		65' Rivaldo	Stadium: Nuevo Anoeta; Attendance: 20 000

6 April 1997 32	Deportivo	1–0	Real Zaragoza	A Coruña
	Rivaldo 33'			Stadium: Riazor; Attendance: 22 000

12 April 1997 33	Tenerife	2–1	Deportivo	Santa Cruz de Tenerife
	Vivar Dorado 9'; Alexis 86'		Rivaldo 84'	Attendance: 16 000

16 April 1997 34	Deportivo	1–0	Compostela	A Coruña
	Rivaldo 48'			Stadium: Riazor

20 April 1997 35	Logroñes	1–2	Deportivo	Logroño
	Ruben Sosa 74'		11' (pen.) Rivaldo; 68' Rivaldo	Stadium: Las Gaunas; Attendance: 14 000

3 May 1997 36	Deportivo	3–0	Sevilla	A Coruña
	Rivaldo 19'; Rivaldo 78' (pen.); Manjarin 81'			Stadium: Riazor; Attendance: 26 000

12 May 1997 37	Valencia	1–1	Deportivo	Valencia
	Ortega 30' (pen.)		17' Renaldo	Stadium: Mestalla

18 May 1997 38	Deportivo	0–0	Sporting Gijon	A Coruña
				Stadium: Estadio Riazor; Attendance: 22,000

24 May 1997 39	Barcelona	1–0	Deportivo La Coruña	Barcelona
	Ronaldo 89'; Abelardo (yellow card); Óscar (yellow card); Couto (yellow card)	Report	Hélder (yellow card) 87' (yellow-red card); Manjarin (yellow card)	Stadium: Camp Nou

1 June 1997 40	Deportivo	0–2	Valladolid	A Coruña
			3' Benjamin; 53' Soto	Stadium: Riazor; Attendance: 25,000

16 June 1997 41	Athletic Bilbao	1–0	Deportivo	Bilbao
	Guerrero 63'			Stadium: San Mamés; Attendance: 40,000

22 June 1997 42	Deportivo	1–0	Extremadura	A Coruña
	Begiristain 64'			Stadium: Riazor; Attendance: 28,000

=== Copa del Rey ===
==== Eightfinals ====
28 January 1997 1	Deportivo	2–2	Espanyol	La Coruña
				Stadium: Riazor

5 February 1997 2	Espanyol	0–0 (2a–2 agg.)	Deportivo	Barcelona

== Statistics ==
=== Players Statistics ===
No.	Pos	Nat	Player	Total		La Liga	
No.	Pos	Nat	Player	Apps	Goals	Apps	Goals
13	GK	(Cameroon) CMR	Jacques Songo'o	37	-28	36+1	-28
2	DF	(Spain) ESP	Armando Álvarez	38	1	38	1
4	DF	(Morocco) MAR	Noureddine Naybet	34	1	34	1
5	DF	(Federal Republic of Yugoslavia) YUG	Miroslav Đukić	29	0	27+2	0
17	DF	(Spain) ESP	Nando	38	1	34+4	1
20	MF	(Brazil) BRA	Donato	39	3	33+6	3
8	MF	(France) FRA	Martins	33	13	33	13
6	MF	(Brazil) BRA	Mauro Silva	32	0	32	0
11	FW	(Brazil) BRA	Rivaldo	41	21	41	21
22	FW	(Brazil) BRA	Renaldo	23	5	22+1	5
7	FW	(Spain) ESP	Javier Manjarín	33	3	20+13	3
1	GK	(Czech Republic) CZE	Petr Kouba	4	-2	4	-2
10	MF	(Spain) ESP	Fran	25	0	18+7	0
22	FW	(Portugal) POR	Hélder Cristóvão	22	0	17+5	0
3	DF	(France) FRA	Jérôme Bonnissel	20	0	16+4	0
14	DF	(Spain) ESP	Paco Jémez	19	0	17+2	0
25	GK	(Spain) ESP	Canales	1	0	1	0
9	FW	(France) FRA	Mickaël Madar	17	3	14+3	3
15	MF	(Spain) ESP	Alfredo	19	0	4+15	0
16	MF	(Brazil) BRA	Flávio Conceição	12	1	8+4	1
18	FW	(Spain) ESP	Aitor Begiristain	10	2	4+6	2
21	MF	(Spain) ESP	Martín Vázquez	12	2	1+11	2
26	FW	(Spain) ESP	David	9	0	2+7	0
27	MF	(Spain) ESP	Viqueira	7	0	1+6	0
28	FW	(Spain) ESP	Deus	7	0	1+6	0
30	FW	(Spain) ESP	Maikel	6	0	1+5	0
16	DF	(Spain) ESP	Voro	3	0	2+1	0
24	GK	(Portugal) POR	Nuno	1	0	0+1	0
