= Daniel Chabrera =

Spanish football coach

Personal information
- Full name: Daniel 'Dani' Chabrera Ríos
- Date of birth: 17 February 1992 (age 34)
- Place of birth: Burriana (Castellón), Spain

Senior career*
Years	Team	Apps	(Gls)
2001 - 2013	Villarreal		

Managerial career
- 2008–2018: Villarreal
- 2018: India U21 National Team
- 2018–2019: Al Nassr
- 2019: Ettifaq
- 2019–2020: Real Madrid
- 2020–2021: Lokomotiv Tashkent
- * Club domestic league appearances and goals

Daniel Chabrera Ríos (17 February 1992 – 2021) more commonly known as Dani, was a professional Spanish footballer turned coach who played and coached as a goalkeeper.

His death was reported in December 2021.

== Playing career ==
Dani was scouted as a goalkeeper at the young age of 11 by Spanish side Villarreal CF. It would be with this team that Dani dedicated 18 years of his professional career. Dani progressed through the academy with Villarreal CF as a player between 2001 and 2013. Along with teammate Marcos Senna, Dani was awarded 'The Yellow Submarine' (a symbol of Villarreal CF), a prestigious award given to players marking 10 years with the club.

== Coaching career ==
In 2013, Dani decided to turn his talent into coaching and became goalkeeper coach for Villarreal CF. Again, showing his talent for coaching, Dani was promoted to coordinator and coached the C, B and eventually First Team. During the summer of 2018, Dani was asked to coach the India national U-21 football team during the International Football Tournament COTIF.

In 2018, Dani's talent was noticed by Portuguese football coach Hélder Cristóvão, who met with Dani and asked him to join him and a team of four other coaching staff in Saudi Arabia to be goalkeeper coach and coordinator for Al-Nassr FC. After a successful season and winning both the Saudi Professional League and U-21s League, fellow Saudi club Ettifaq FC requested Dani and his coaching staff to coach their final few remaining matches of the season to avoid relegation; the change saved the team from relegation.

In October 2019, Dani began working for Real Madrid C.F International Department as goalkeeper coach until he moved back to foreign football. Dani coached P.F.C Lokomotiv first team and was the coordinator of the academy.

Additionally, Dani organised and coached annual International Football Camps and lectures football coaching seminars across Spain.
