= José Corral =

José Corral may refer to:

- José Manuel Corral (politician), Argentinian politician
- José Manuel Corral (footballer), Spanish footballer and manager
- José Andrés Corral Arredondo, Roman Catholic bishop in Mexico
