= Peter Rufai =

Nigerian footballer (1963–2025)

- Rufai with Nigeria in 1998

Personal information
- Date of birth: 24 August 1963
- Place of birth: Lagos, Nigeria
- Date of death: 3 July 2025 (aged 61)
- Place of death: Lagos, Nigeria
- Height: 1.87 m (6 ft 2 in)
- Position: Goalkeeper

Senior career*
| Years | Team | Apps | (Gls) |
| 1980–1984 | Stationery Stores | | |
| 1985 | Femo Scorpions | | |
| 1986–1987 | Dragons de l'Ouémé | | |
| 1987–1991 | Lokeren | 206 | (0) |
| 1991–1993 | Beveren | | |
| 1993–1994 | Go Ahead Eagles | 12 | (0) |
| 1994–1997 | Farense | 62 | (0) |
| 1997 | Hércules | 10 | (0) |
| 1997–1999 | Deportivo La Coruña | 9 | (0) |
| 1999–2000 | Gil Vicente | 1 | (0) |
| Total | | +300 | (0) |

International career
| 1983–1998 | Nigeria | 65 | (1) |
- * Club domestic league appearances and goals

Peter Rufai (24 August 1963 – 3 July 2025) was a Nigerian professional footballer who played as a goalkeeper. Having begun his career with Stationery Stores, he competed professionally abroad in Belgium, the Netherlands, Portugal and Spain in a senior career that lasted 20 years.

Rufai represented Nigeria in two World Cups and as many Africa Cup of Nations tournaments.

== Club career ==
Born in Lagos, Rufai started his career in his country, playing with Stationery Stores and Femo Scorpions. He moved to Benin in 1986, with Dragons de l'Ouémé.

At a more professional level Rufai spent six years in Belgium, with Sporting Lokeren and K.S.K. Beveren, although he appeared sparingly. In the 1993–94 season he played 12 matches for Dutch neighbours Go Ahead Eagles, which finished 12th in the Eredivisie.

In 1994, Rufai started a Portuguese adventure with Farense. In his first year, he was instrumental as the Algarve side only conceded 38 goals in 34 matches, qualifying to the UEFA Cup for the first time ever. His solid performances earned him a transfer to La Liga, but he struggled to start for lowly Hércules during his stay, in an eventual relegation.

However, Rufai signed with established Deportivo La Coruña the ensuing summer, backing up another African, Jacques Songo'o, for two seasons – this included keeping a clean sheet in a January 1998 home win against Tenerife (1–0) as the Cameroonian was suspended. He then returned to Portugal for one final year, with modest Gil Vicente, also being second-choice.

Rufai returned to Spain in 2003, settling in the country and opening a goalkeeper's school.

== International career ==
Rufai earned 65 caps for Nigeria featuring at three AFCON while emerging victorious in the three semi-final penalty shootouts. and represented the nation at two FIFA World Cups in 1994 and 1998 as their first-choice goalkeeper and also helped the Super Eagles win the 1994 African Cup of Nations in Tunisia.

On 24 July 1993, during a CAN qualifying match against Ethiopia, Rufai scored a penalty in a 6–0 home win.

== Personal life and death ==
Rufai was the son of a tribal king in the region of Idimu. In early 1998, as his father died, he was allowed by his club (Deportivo) to return to Nigeria to discuss the succession, but turned down the status for himself.

He was married to Stella Rufai and had three children: A son, Tunde, and two daughters, Tutu and Abiodun. Rufai also had other children outside his marriage; one of them, Senbaty, played as a midfielder, having tried for Sunshine Stars F.C. in the Nigeria Premier League.

Rufai died following a prolonged illness, on July, the 3rd, 2025, at the age of 61.

== Career statistics ==
| No. | Date | Venue | Opponent | Score | Result | Competition |
|---|---|---|---|---|---|---|
| 1 | 24 July 1993 | Surulere Stadium, Lagos, Nigeria | Ethiopia | 6–0 | 6–0 | 1994 African Cup of Nations qualification |
