= Rivaldo =

Brazilian footballer (born 1972)

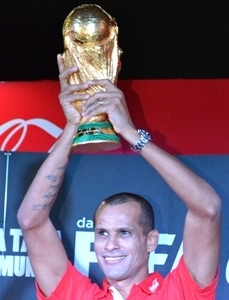
- Rivaldo with the 2002 FIFA World Cup trophy

Personal information
- Full name: Rivaldo Vítor Borba Ferreira
- Date of birth: 19 April 1972 (age 54)
- Place of birth: Recife, Brazil
- Height: 1.87 m (6 ft 2 in)
- Positions: Attacking midfielder; left winger; forward

Team information
- Current team: Farul Constanța (minority shareholder)

Youth career
- 1983–1989: Santa Cruz
- 1989: Paulistano
- 1989–1992: Santa Cruz

Senior career*
Years	Team	Apps	(Gls)
1988–1992	Santa Cruz	27	(9)
1992–1994	Mogi Mirim	27	(9)
1993–1994	→ Corinthians (loan)	22	(11)
1994–1996	Palmeiras	112	(67)
1996–1997	Deportivo La Coruña	41	(21)
1997–2002	Barcelona	157	(86)
2002–2003	AC Milan	22	(5)
2004	Cruzeiro	7	(2)
2004–2007	Olympiacos	70	(36)
2007–2008	AEK Athens	35	(12)
2008–2011	Bunyodkor	53	(33)
2011	→ São Paulo (loan)	39	(6)
2012	Kabuscorp	21	(11)
2013	São Caetano	17	(2)
2014–2015	Mogi Mirim	12	(1)
Total		626	(299)

International career
1992–1993	Brazil U20	9	(1)
1996	Brazil Olympic (O.P.)	7	(1)
1993–2003	Brazil	74	(35)
Medal record
Men's football
Representing Brazil
FIFA World Cup
Winner	2002 Korea/Japan
Runner-up	1998 France
FIFA Confederations Cup
Winner	1997 Saudi Arabia
Copa América
Winner	1999 Paraguay
Olympic Games
Third place	1996 Atlanta	Team
- * Club domestic league appearances and goals

Rivaldo Vítor Borba Ferreira (Brazilian Portuguese: [ʁiˈvawdu ˈvitoʁ ˈbɔʁbɐ feˈʁe(j)ɾɐ]; born 19 April 1972), known simply as Rivaldo, is a Brazilian former professional footballer who played primarily as an attacking midfielder or second striker, while also operating as a left winger. Known for his skill and creativity, Rivaldo was renowned for his bending free kicks, bicycle kicks, feints, powerful ball striking from distance, and ability to both score and create goals. In 1999, he won the Ballon d'Or and was named FIFA World Player of the Year. In 2004, he was named by Pelé in the FIFA 100 list of the world's greatest living players. With success at club and international level, he is one of eleven players to have won the FIFA World Cup, the UEFA Champions League and the Ballon d'Or, and is widely regarded as one of the greatest players of all time. In addition, he is also one of a select number of players who have amassed over 1,050 career appearances.

Rivaldo started his career in 1991 with Brazilian club Santa Cruz, going on to have spells at Mogi Mirim, a loan spell at Corinthians, and Palmeiras. In 1996, he moved to Europe with Spanish side Deportivo La Coruña, where his performances in his only season there led him to sign for Barcelona in 1997. At Barcelona, he formed a successful partnership with Dutch international Patrick Kluivert, and won consecutive La Liga titles in 1998 and 1999, as well as the 1998 Copa del Rey. Rivaldo notably scored a hattrick against Valencia in June 2001 which qualified Barcelona for the 2001–02 UEFA Champions League; the last goal was a last minute 20-yard bicycle kick winner and the hattrick itself is often ranked as the greatest ever. During his five-year tenure there, he scored 130 goals, ranking him among Barcelona's highest goalscorers of all time. In 2002, Rivaldo signed for Italian club AC Milan, winning the Coppa Italia and the UEFA Champions League in his only season there, however, his performances were underwhelming and he cancelled his contract with Milan in late 2003. He went on to play for Cruzeiro, Olympiacos, AEK Athens, Bunyodkor, a loan spell at São Paulo, Kabuscorp and São Caetano. In March 2014, Rivaldo announced his retirement from professional football, however since June 2015 he made appearances for Mogi Mirim, before retiring again in August 2015.

From 1993 to 2003, Rivaldo played 74 matches and scored 35 goals for Brazil and is the seventh highest goalscorer for the country. He helped Brazil reach the final of the 1998 FIFA World Cup and won the 1999 Copa América where he was named player of the tournament. Rivaldo starred in an attacking trio with Ronaldo and Ronaldinho in the 2002 FIFA World Cup winning team. Scoring in five of Brazil's seven games at the tournament, Rivaldo was named in the FIFA World Cup All-Star Team in 2002 having also previously been selected in 1998. He is an inductee to the Brazilian Football Museum Hall of Fame.

He is a minority shareholder of Romanian Liga I club Farul Constanța.

== Early life ==
Born in Recife, Brazil, Rivaldo had a poor upbringing in the favelas of the city. His physical appearance still marks the poverty he experienced in his childhood: malnourishment-caused bowleggedness and the loss of several teeth. Predominantly left footed, Rivaldo began his professional career at the age of 16, when he signed with Paulistano in 1989, despite the Paulistano coaches believing him too physically weak to succeed. Rivaldo's father Romildo was killed in a road accident in 1989, but Rivaldo signed his first professional contract later that year.

== Club career ==
=== Santa Cruz, Mogi Mirim and Corinthians ===
He went on to play for Santa Cruz in 1991. In 1992, he moved south to the state of São Paulo where he played for Mogi Mirim in the second tier of Brazilian football. In 1993, he moved to the state capital to play for Corinthians in the first division, on loan.

=== Palmeiras ===
In the next year, he switched local allegiances and moved to Palmeiras. His transfer was announced on 11 August 1994, with a fee of US$ 2.5 million (R$ 2.27 million), as confirmed by Mogi Mirim's vice-president, Helcio Luis Adorno. Rivaldo helped Palmeiras successfully defend its league championship in 1994 and win Campeonato Paulista in 1996. In both 1993 and 1994, he was honoured by the authoritative publication Placar Magazine with the Bola de Ouro for the best player in his position.

=== Deportivo ===
Before the 1996 Olympics, Parma announced that they had signed Rivaldo and his teammate Amaral from Palmeiras. After the Olympics, there was a dispute, and rather than Italy, Rivaldo moved to Spain as he joined Deportivo La Coruña in La Liga. He only stayed for one season, but nonetheless it proved to be a successful one for both him and the club. Rivaldo was the joint-fourth top goalscorer of the season, with 21 goals from 41 matches, as Deportivo finished third in the league.

=== Barcelona ===
Rivaldo switched to Barcelona in 1997 in a transfer deal securing Deportivo a 4 billion pesetas (around $26 million) transfer fee, with Sir Bobby Robson convincing Barcelona to sign Rivaldo ahead of Steve McManaman by saying that Rivaldo would guarantee the team many goals.

Rivaldooo...that's magnificent. Ohh wonderful. You just could not envisage such a finish to the season. The Brazilian completes a hat-trick, a minute from time with the most delightful of goals you will ever see. A goal in a million, to earn many many millions next season.

— Sky Sports commentary on Rivaldo's last minute overhead bicycle kick match winner against Valencia in La Liga on 17 June 2001 to qualify Barcelona for next season's UEFA Champions League.

In his first season at Barcelona, Rivaldo was the second top goalscorer with 19 goals in 34 matches, as Barcelona won The Double of La Liga and Copa del Rey. In 1999, he won another La Liga title with Barcelona, and once again was the league's second highest scorer with 24 goals. In 1999, Rivaldo was named FIFA World Player of the Year and he also received the Ballon d'Or. After Barcelona's unsuccessful Champions League campaign, Rivaldo was linked with a move away from the Camp Nou. Then Manchester United captain Roy Keane was reported stating Rivaldo was the player he most wanted United to sign.

At times around the turn of the century he was impossible to play against, and never more so than here. The quality of the goals was outstanding, but the context made his performance legendary. After just 18 months and 17 days, the book on the greatest hat-trick of the 21st century was already closed.

— Rob Smyth of The Guardian on Rivaldo's hat-trick against Valencia in June 2001.

In his third season at Barcelona, Rivaldo fell out with manager Louis van Gaal, when he insisted playing as a playmaker rather than on the left wing. Even though he had a strained relationship with Van Gaal, Rivaldo went on to score 10 goals in the season's Champions League as the club reached the semi-finals. Van Gaal was fired in June 2000.

In the following 2000–01 season, Rivaldo was once again the second highest goalscorer of the league, with 23 goals. In the decisive last game of the season, against Champions League finalist Valencia, Rivaldo scored a hat-trick to win the game 3–2, pushing Barcelona ahead of Valencia to secure a place in the 2001–02 Champions League. Frequently ranked the greatest hat-trick ever, his first goal was a trademark bending free kick that curled into the bottom right corner, the second saw him send the Valencia player the wrong way with a feint before a strike with little back-lift from 25 yards swerved into the bottom left corner of the net, and his match-winning third occurred after Rivaldo controlled the ball with the chest from the edge of the 18-yard box and executed an overhead bicycle kick in the 89th minute, which he regards as the best goal of his career. An ecstatic Rivaldo ripped off his jersey and started swinging it over his head during his goal celebrations, while Barcelona club president Joan Gaspart broke with convention in the stadium's VIP box by punching the air with both fists and yelling his delight next to the opposition delegation. After the game Rivaldo stated; "What happened tonight has been incredible. I dedicate the winning goal to all the players who have fought so hard all season and all the supporters who have suffered so much. I'm delighted to have made them happy with my goals." He scored a total of 36 goals that season. During his five-year tenure at Barcelona, Rivaldo scored 130 goals, ranking him among the club's highest goalscorers of all time.

=== Milan ===
Rivaldo signed a three-year deal with the Italian Serie A club A.C. Milan in 2002. With Milan, he won the Coppa Italia and the Champions League in the 2002–03 season. In August 2003, he also won the UEFA Super Cup before cancelling his contract with Milan in November that year. After leaving Milan, he briefly returned to Brazil, playing for Cruzeiro in Belo Horizonte. He came close to signing for Bolton Wanderers in 2004, though Bolton eventually pulled out of the deal. as well as turning down a trial with Celtic during the summer of that year as he felt the offer of a trial was an insult. Due to his poor performances throughout the season, he won the Bidone d'Oro Award in 2003, which is given to the worst Serie A player during a particular season.

=== Cruzeiro ===
Rivaldo decided to return to Brazil in early 2004, by appointment of coach Vanderlei Luxemburgo who convinced him to play for the club, becoming Cruzeiro's major signing for the Copa Libertadores. However, his time with the team was very short, only eleven games and two goals. As reported by CNN, Rivaldo left the club after just two months due to the firing of Luxemburgo, Rivaldo's mentor earlier in his career. Rivaldo stated: "When he left, I preferred to leave as well. It was my decision because I consider Luxemburgo to be a special person."

=== Olympiacos ===
On 22 July 2004, Rivaldo joined Olympiacos of Super League Greece. During the 2004–05 season he scored some stand out goals, one of them coming in his first derby against Panathinaikos that arguably turned out to be his most famous in an Olympiacos shirt: a bending free kick to send Olympiacos to victory over their eternal rivals. Another notable goal by Rivaldo came the following week in Olympiacos's matchday 6 UEFA Champions League group game in England against eventual champions Liverpool where he scored a deft free-kick in front of the Kop and put the Greek giants ahead. However Olympiacos were eliminated after Liverpool talisman Steven Gerrard scored with a 25-yard half volley 3 minutes from full-time. In the last game of Rivaldo's first season at Olympiacos, the club needed a victory in order to win the Alpha Ethniki championship, with Panathinaikos just one point behind. Olympiacos went on to beat Iraklis 0–1 in an away match in Thessaloniki, thanks to Rivaldo's goal, and secured the championship.

Rivaldo renewed his contract with Olympiacos for a third year, despite now being 34 years old. In July 2006, Rivaldo announced that the 2006–07 season with Olympiacos would be his last in Europe, before returning to Brazil. However, he quickly changed his decision and decided to stay for another year. The 2006–2007 season saw him score 17 goals in 27 Super League matches. Rivaldo scored 43 goals in 81 games for Olympiacos.

=== AEK Athens ===
Rivaldo was released by Olympiacos after a dispute with the chairman of the club, Sokratis Kokkalis, who had differences about the contract. Later that summer, he signed for Super League club AEK Athens on 29 May 2007. His first Super League goal with the Athens' club came through a penalty in their 3–0 win against Panionios. Rivaldo had another great season and the team. After the winning match against Olympiacos with 4–0, Rivaldo showed his four fingers to the camera.

Rivaldo had stated his intention to leave Greece if the ruling went in favour of Olympiakos and AEK Athens were not declared champions. He stated: "A team that was not good enough to win the title on the pitch does not deserve the trophy."

=== Bunyodkor ===
Rivaldo announced on 25 August 2008 to a Greek Sport Radio Station that he agreed to continue his career at Bunyodkor in Uzbekistan, effective immediately, after what he described as an "extremely tempting contract offer".

Rivaldo signed a two-year contract worth €10.2 million and later signed an extension to extend the contract to 2011. On his debut for Bunyodkor, Rivaldo scored both goals in a 2–0 win. In 2009, Rivaldo became the first player in the world to score one, then two, then three, then four goals in four consecutive matches. He scored one goal in the first match and two goals in the second match against Navbahor. In the third match on 25 June 2009, Rivaldo scored a hat trick in a 4–0 win against Metallurg. In the fourth match, Bunyodkor beat Sogdiana Jizzakh 5–0 and Rivaldo scored four in 17 minutes. After the end of the 2009 season, Rivaldo won UFF Topscorer award, having scored 20 league goals, and was runner up for UFF Player of the Year award. He scored 33 goals for the club in total. Rivaldo announced on 11 August 2010 on Twitter that he had cancelled his contract with Bunyodkor.

=== Return to Mogi Mirim ===
On 18 November 2010, he announced he would be returning to Mogi Mirim, the club that he had started his career in the early 1990s, through his Social Networking site, saying: "After sorting out a lot of things outside of the country, I have decided to play the Paulista 2011 for Mogi Mirim, of whom I am President." However, he joined São Paulo in January 2011.

=== São Paulo ===
On 23 January 2011, Rivaldo joined São Paulo. He scored on his debut for them in the First Division against Linense with a wonderful goal. The ball was sent over from the left hand side of the pitch, before Rivaldo controlled the ball and took it over a defender using his left knee, and finished at the near post. He spent most part of March 2011 tending injury, but came back for following fixtures such as a 1–1 draw with Palmeiras and a 2–1 win over Corinthians.

Rivaldo stated on his Twitter account that he would leave São Paulo by the end of the season: "I just want to inform everybody that on Saturday, it's going to be my last training session at São Paulo. I've been told by the club's official that this is going to be my last season here." He added: "I'm not saying goodbye to football yet. I still have a lot to accomplish. I just wish I could hang up my boots at the end of 2012."

=== Kabuscorp ===
Rivaldo joined Angolan club Kabuscorp in January 2012. On 18 March, Rivaldo scored a hat-trick against Recreativo Caala. Rivaldo left Kabuscorp in November 2012 after the expiration of his contract.

=== São Caetano ===
In January 2013, Rivaldo joined São Caetano of Brazil's Serie B, signing a deal that ran to December. He scored his first goal for his new club in his debut against Corinthians on 9 February. During the following match against Bragantino Rivaldo once again scored, although his team lost 2–1. In November 2013, he left the club due to knee problems.

=== Second return to Mogi Mirim ===
In December 2013, Rivaldo joined Mogi Mirim, signing a deal that ran until 2015. His son Rivaldinho played for the club. Rivaldo had only made one league appearance for the club when he retired in July 2015.

=== Retirement ===
In March 2014, the Brazilian icon officially retired from football after a career which spanned more than 20 years, and he decided to remain as the president of Mogi Mirim to help run the club and to look after his son, Rivaldinho. In a released statement, Rivaldo commented: "My history as a player has come to the end. With tears in my eyes today I would like to thank God, my family and all the support, the affection that I received during those 24 years as a player." However, he returned to the team in June 2015. On 14 July 2015, Rivaldo and Rivaldinho scored goals in the same match for the first time as Mogi Mirim beat Macaé 3–1.

On 18 January 2019, SCC Mohammédia announced Rivaldo as their new technical director and coach for the following season. The player denied that a deal was made, as he signed a pre-contract in which the club must achieve promotion from National (third tier in the Moroccan league).

== International career ==
In 1993, he debuted for the Brazil national football team, scoring the only goal in a friendly match against Mexico. He was selected to represent Brazil at the 1996 Summer Olympics. The Brazilian team won the bronze medal, but Rivaldo was not selected for the third place playoff.

Rivaldo returned to the Brazil national team for the 1998 FIFA World Cup, where he scored three goals en route to the final, including two in the 3–2 quarter-final win against Denmark. Brazil were defeated 3–0 by hosts France in final, failing to defend their 1994 title. Rivaldo had not been a part of the victorious Brazilian team at the 1997 Copa América tournament, but was part of the successful defence of that title at the 1999 Copa América. Rivaldo finished the tournament as the top scorer, with five goals; one being an equaliser from a free-kick in a 2–1 win over Argentina in the quarter-finals, and two in the 3–0 victory over Uruguay in the final. He was named the Most Valuable Player of the tournament.

Rivaldo had been the centre of criticism when Brazil did not win tournaments, ever since the 1996 Olympics. In the 1–0 win against Colombia in November 2000, Rivaldo was booed so heavily that he threatened to retire from playing for his country.

It was a great joy and honour to play alongside Ronaldo and Ronaldinho in the 2002 World Cup. Our teamwork was great and it showed through the results.

— Rivaldo on the "three R's".

The zenith and nadir of Rivaldo's national team career came at the 2002 FIFA World Cup, hosted in South Korea and Japan, where he was able to erase the disappointment of the previous World Cup Final defeat, helping Brazil win their fifth World Cup. Featuring in an attacking trio with Ronaldo and Ronaldinho, dubbed "the three R's", Rivaldo scored in the first five games while Ronaldo scored in four matches. Despite a successful tournament, Rivaldo was involved in a controversial incident against Turkey. Near the end of the match, with the ball out of play, Turkish defender Hakan Ünsal kicked a ball towards Rivaldo, who was waiting at the corner flag. The ball struck his thigh, but Rivaldo fell to the ground clutching his face. The referee sent the Turkish player off with a second yellow card. After a video review, Rivaldo was fined 11,670 Swiss francs by FIFA.

On the eve of the final, Ronaldo, Rivaldo and Ronaldinho warmed up in the Yokohama Stadium by merrily trying to out-wizard each other in the Japanese drizzle.

— Amy Lawrence of The Guardian on the bond of the "three Rs".

Rivaldo's goal against Belgium in the second round prompted Belgian coach Robert Waseige to name him as the deciding factor. Ronaldinho assisted Rivaldo to score the equaliser against England in the quarter-finals before Ronaldinho scored the winning goal in a 2–1 victory. Brazil met Germany in the final, and went on to win the tournament with a 2–0 victory, courtesy of two goals by Ronaldo with Rivaldo involved in both goals. The first came after Rivaldo's shot was saved by German goalkeeper Oliver Kahn with Ronaldo scoring the rebound, and the second saw Rivaldo fool the German defence with a dummy as the ball ran on to Ronaldo who finished. Rivaldo was named by Brazil coach Luiz Felipe Scolari as the best player of the tournament. Rivaldo along with Ronaldo and Ronaldinho were named in the FIFA World Cup All-Star Team.

Rivaldo's last cap was on 19 November 2003 in Curitiba in a 3–3 draw with Uruguay. He played 79 minutes before being substituted for Luís Fabiano. He had scored his last goal just three days earlier from the penalty spot in a 1–1 draw with Peru. In his time with the national side, Rivaldo won 74 caps, and scored 35 goals.

== Style of play ==
Regarded as one of the best players of his generation, Rivaldo was praised for his dribbling ability, use of feints, balance, and close ball control. Despite his height, he was also thought to be extremely agile. A dead-ball specialist, Rivaldo was lauded for his bending free kicks and penalty taking, as well as his ability to score from distance. Left footed and considered highly creative, he was also known for his ball striking from volleys, and for scoring from bicycle kicks.

Apart from a right foot, Rivaldo had everything. His wiry strength allowed him to bounce off defenders, he was an outstanding dribbler, and he had a left foot that was both educated and thuggish, subtle and a sledgehammer. Brazil's bandy-legged genius was the most unstoppable footballer since Maradona.

— Rob Smyth writing for The Guardian on Rivaldo's style of play in 2008.

Although he was not an out-and-out striker, Rivaldo was a prolific goalscorer who could play in several attacking roles, most notably as a left winger or an attacking midfielder. During his first two seasons at Barcelona under Louis van Gaal, and throughout much of the period that culminated in his 1999 Ballon d'Or and FIFA World Player of the Year awards, he was generally deployed on the left side of a 4–1–2–3 formation, from where he frequently cut infield, rather than operating centrally as a classic number 10. Despite his success in this role, Rivaldo considered the centre to be his best position and sought to play there as a number 10. Following a dispute with Van Gaal over his positioning during the 1999–2000 season, he agreed to return to the left wing, although he was subsequently also used centrally at times. At international level, his role varied according to Brazil's tactical system. At the 1998 FIFA World Cup, he operated as the right-sided attacking midfielder in Mário Zagallo's 4–2–2–2 formation, drifting into central areas and cutting inside onto his stronger left foot. At the 2002 FIFA World Cup, he played in a more advanced role alongside Ronaldinho behind Ronaldo in Luiz Felipe Scolari's 3–4–2–1 formation. Predominantly left-footed, he was noted for his dribbling and his ability to contribute both goals and assists while operating from the left.

In 2002, John Carlin of The Guardian noted that Rivaldo "combines to dazzling effect the two essential qualities of the ideal footballer: artistry and efficiency". His colleague, Rob Smyth, echoed his views in 2008, commenting: "if you could marry British will with continental skill, you would have the perfect footballer. Such a mixed recipe was thrillingly in evidence in Diego Maradona. Since then, however, perhaps only Rivaldo has fused the two qualities", noting that like the Argentinian, the Brazilian had "bronca" (the word used repeatedly in Maradona's autobiography to refer to "anger, fury, hatred, resentment, bitter discontent"). Former Dutch international Ruud Gullit believed that Rivaldo's ability and qualities were often overlooked, as "he played in the same era as Brazilian counterparts Ronaldo and Ronaldinho."

== Personal life ==
Rivaldo is a devout Evangelical Christian.

His son Rivaldinho is also a professional footballer, who currently plays for Thai League club Bangkok United.

Rivaldo supported Jair Bolsonaro for the 2018 Brazilian general election.

== Career statistics ==
=== Club ===
Appearances and goals by club, season and competition
Club	Season	League			National cup (Note: Includes Copa do Brasil, Copa del Rey, Coppa Italia, Greek Cup, Uzbek Cup)		Continental		State league (Note: Includes Campeonato Pernambucano, Campeonato Paulista, Campeonato Mineiro)		Other		Total	
Club	Season	Division	Apps	Goals	Apps	Goals	Apps	Goals	Apps	Goals	Apps	Goals	Apps	Goals
Santa Cruz	1991	Série B	—						18	8	—		18	8
Santa Cruz	1992	Série B	9	1	—						—		9	1
Santa Cruz	Total		9	1	—				18	8	—		27	9
Mogi Mirim	1992	—							27	9	4	4	31	13
Corinthians	1993	Série A	8	2	—				14	9	—		22	11
Corinthians	1994	Série A	—		1	0	—				1	1	2	1
Corinthians	Total		8	2	1	0	—		14	9	1	1	24	12
Palmeiras	1994	Série A	29	14	—		—				—		29	14
Palmeiras	1995	Série A	16	7	—		9 (Note: Appearances in Copa Libertadores)	5	24	19	—		49	31
Palmeiras	1996	Série A	—		2	0	—		32	22	—		34	22
Palmeiras	Total		45	21	2	0	9	5	56	41	—		112	67
Deportivo La Coruña	1996–97	La Liga	41	21	5	1	—						46	22
Barcelona	1997–98	La Liga	34	19	7	8	6 (Note: Appearances in UEFA Champions League)	0	—		4 (Note: Two appearances in Supercopa de España, two appearances and one goal in UEFA Super Cup)	1	51	28
Barcelona	1998–99	La Liga	37	24	3	2	6	3	—		2 (Note: Appearances in Supercopa de España)	0	48	29
Barcelona	1999–00	La Liga	31	12	5	1	14	10	—		—		50	23
Barcelona	2000–01	La Liga	35	23	5	2	13 (Note: Six appearances and six goals in UEFA Champions League, seven appearances and five goals in UEFA Cup)	11	—		—		53	36
Barcelona	2001–02	La Liga	20	8	—		13	6	—		—		33	14
Barcelona	Total		157	86	20	13	52	30	—		6	1	235	130
Milan	2002–03	Serie A	22	5	3	1	13	2	—		—		38	8
Milan	2003–04	Serie A	—				1	0	—		1 (Note: Appearance in UEFA Super Cup)	0	2	0
Milan	Total		22	5	3	1	14	2	—		1	0	40	8
Cruzeiro	2004	Série A	—				3	0	7	2	—		10	2
Olympiacos	2004–05	Alpha Ethniki	23	12	2	2	9 (Note: Six appearances and one goal in UEFA Champions League, three appearances in UEFA Cup)	1	—		—		34	15
Olympiacos	2005–06	Alpha Ethniki	22	7	2	2	6	2	—		—		30	11
Olympiacos	2006–07	Super League Greece	25	17	—		6	0	—		—		31	17
Olympiacos	Total		70	36	4	4	21	3	—				95	43
AEK Athens	2007–08	Super League Greece	35	12	—		8 (Note: Two appearances and one goal in UEFA Champions League, six appearances and two goals in UEFA Cup)	3	—				43	15
AEK Athens	2008–09	Super League Greece	—		—		1 (Note: Appearance in UEFA Cup)	0	—				1	0
AEK Athens	Total		35	12	—		9	3	—				44	15
Bunyodkor	2008	Uzbek League	12	7	1	0	4 (Note: Appearances in AFC Champions League)	2	—				17	9
Bunyodkor	2009	Uzbek League	30	20	1	1	9	1	—				40	22
Bunyodkor	2010	Uzbek League	11	6	3	3	5	2	—				19	11
Bunyodkor	Total		53	33	5	4	18	5	—				76	42
São Paulo	2011	Série A	30	5	4	0	3 (Note: Appearances in Copa Sudamericana)	1	9	1	—		46	7
Kabuscorp	2012	Girabola	21	11	—		—		—		—		21	11
São Caetano	2013	Série B	7	0	2	0	—		10	2	—		19	2
Mogi Mirim	2014	Série C	4	0	—		—		4	0	—		8	0
Mogi Mirim	2015	Série B	4	1	—		—		—		—		4	1
Mogi Mirim	Total		8	1	—		—		4	0	—		12	1
Career total			481	227	46	23	129	49	145	72	12	6	813	384

=== International ===
Appearances and goals by national team and year
National team	Year	Apps	Goals
Brazil	1993	1	1
Brazil	1994	1	0
Brazil	1995	5	1
Brazil	1996	2	2
Brazil	1997	4	1
Brazil	1998	12	5
Brazil	1999	13	8
Brazil	2000	11	8
Brazil	2001	8	3
Brazil	2002	10	5
Brazil	2003	7	1
Total		74	35

Scores and results list Brazil's goal tally first, score column indicates score after each Rivaldo goal.

List of international goals scored by Rivaldo
No.	Date	Venue	Opponent	Score	Result	Competition
1	16 December 1993	Estadio Jalisco, Guadalajara, Mexico	Mexico	1–0	1–0	Friendly
2	18 May 1995	Ramat Gan Stadium, Ramat Gan, Israel	Israel	2–0	2–1	Friendly
3	27 March 1996	Teixeirão, São José do Rio Preto, Brazil	Ghana	6–1	8–2	Friendly
5	11 November 1997	Brasília, Brazil	Wales	2–0	3–0	Friendly
7	16 June 1998	Stade de la Beaujoire, Nantes, France	Morocco	2–0	3–0	1998 FIFA World Cup
8	3 July 1998	Stade de la Beaujoire, Nantes, France	Denmark	2–1	3–2	1998 FIFA World Cup
9	3 July 1998	Stade de la Beaujoire, Nantes, France	Denmark	3–2	3–2	1998 FIFA World Cup
10	18 November 1998	Castelão (Ceará), Fortaleza, Brazil	Russia	3–0	5–1	Friendly
11	30 June 1999	Estadio Antonio Oddone Sarubbi, Ciudad del Este, Paraguay	Venezuela	7–0	7–0	1999 Copa América
12	11 July 1999	Estadio Antonio Oddone Sarubbi, Ciudad del Este, Paraguay	Argentina	2–1	2–1	1999 Copa América
13	14 July 1999	Estadio Antonio Oddone Sarubbi, Ciudad del Este, Paraguay	Mexico	2–0	2–0	1999 Copa América
14	18 July 1999	Estadio Defensores del Chaco, Asunción, Paraguay	Uruguay	1–0	3–0	1999 Copa América
15	18 July 1999	Estadio Defensores del Chaco, Asunción, Paraguay	Uruguay	2–0	3–0	1999 Copa América
16	7 September 1999	Estádio Beira-Rio, Porto Alegre, Brazil	Argentina	1–0	4–2	Friendly
17	7 September 1999	Estádio Beira-Rio, Porto Alegre, Brazil	Argentina	2–0	4–2	Friendly
18	7 September 1999	Estádio Beira-Rio, Porto Alegre, Brazil	Argentina	3–1	4–2	Friendly
19	23 February 2000	Rajamangala Stadium, Bangkok, Thailand	Thailand	1–0	7–0	2000 King's Cup
20	23 February 2000	Rajamangala Stadium, Bangkok, Thailand	Thailand	2–0	7–0	2000 King's Cup
21	26 April 2000	Estádio do Morumbi, São Paulo, Brazil	Ecuador	1–1	3–2	2002 FIFA World Cup qualification
22	26 April 2000	Estádio do Morumbi, São Paulo, Brazil	Ecuador	3–1	3–2	2002 FIFA World Cup qualification
23	23 May 2000	Millennium Stadium, Cardiff, Wales	Wales	3–0	3–0	Friendly
24	28 June 2000	Estádio do Maracanã, Rio de Janeiro, Brazil	Uruguay	1–1	1–1	2002 FIFA World Cup qualification
25	18 July 2000	Estadio Defensores del Chaco, Asunción, Paraguay	Paraguay	1–1	1–2	2002 FIFA World Cup qualification
26	3 September 2000	Estádio do Maracanã, Rio de Janeiro, Brazil	Bolivia	2–0	5–0	2002 FIFA World Cup qualification
27	15 August 2001	Estádio Olímpico Monumental, Porto Alegre, Brazil	Paraguay	2–0	2–0	2002 FIFA World Cup qualification
28	7 October 2001	Estádio Couto Pereira, Curitiba, Brazil	Chile	2–0	2–0	2002 FIFA World Cup qualification
29	14 November 2001	Castelão (Maranhão), São Luís, Brazil	Venezuela	3–0	3–0	2002 FIFA World Cup qualification
30	3 June 2002	Munsu Cup Stadium, Ulsan, South Korea	Turkey	2–1	2–1	2002 FIFA World Cup
31	8 June 2002	Jeju World Cup Stadium, Jeju, South Korea	China	2–0	4–0	2002 FIFA World Cup
32	13 June 2002	Suwon World Cup Stadium, Suwon, South Korea	Costa Rica	4–2	5–2	2002 FIFA World Cup
33	17 June 2002	Kobe Wing Stadium, Kobe, Japan	Belgium	1–0	2–0	2002 FIFA World Cup
34	21 June 2002	Shizuoka Stadium, Fukuroi, Japan	England	1–1	2–1	2002 FIFA World Cup
35	16 November 2003	Estadio Monumental "U", Lima, Peru	Peru	1–0	1–1	2006 FIFA World Cup qualification

== Honours ==
Santa Cruz

- Campeonato Pernambucano: 1990

Palmeiras

- Brazilian Série A: 1994
- Campeonato Paulista: 1996
- Copa do Brasil runner-up: 1996

Barcelona

- La Liga: 1997–98, 1998–99
- Copa del Rey: 1997–98
- UEFA Super Cup: 1997

Milan

- Coppa Italia: 2002–03
- UEFA Champions League: 2002–03
- UEFA Super Cup: 2003

Cruzeiro

- Campeonato Mineiro: 2004

Olympiacos

- Alpha Ethniki/Super League Greece: 2004–05, 2005–06, 2006–07
- Greek Cup: 2004–05, 2005–06

Bunyodkor

- Uzbek League: 2008, 2009, 2010
- Uzbekistan Cup: 2008, 2010

Brazil U23

- Summer Olympics bronze medal: 1996

Brazil

- FIFA World Cup: 2002; runner-up: 1998
- Copa América: 1999
- FIFA Confederations Cup: 1997

Individual

- Bola de Prata: 1993, 1994
- La Liga Best Foreign Player: 1997–98
- Copa del Rey top scorer: 1997–98
- FIFA World Cup All-Star Team: 1998, 2002
- ESM Team of the Year: 1998–99, 1999–2000
- Ballon d'Or: 1999
- FIFA World Player of the Year: 1999; bronze award: 2000
- World Soccer Player of the Year: 1999
- Onze d'Or: 1999
- Copa América Golden Boot: 1999
- Copa América Golden Ball: 1999
- Trofeo EFE: 1999
- RSSSF Player of the Year: 1999
- UEFA Champions League top scorer: 1999–2000
- IFFHS World's Top Goal Scorer: 2000
- La Liga top assist provider: 2000–01
- FIFA World Cup Silver Shoe: 2002
- World XI: 2002
- FIFA 100
- Alpha Ethniki Best Foreign Player: 2005–06, 2006–07
- Super League Greece top assist provider: 2007–08
- Uzbek League top scorer: 2009
- Uzbek League top assist provider: 2009
- Brazilian Football Museum Hall of Fame

== See also ==
- List of men's footballers with the most official appearances
- List of association football families
- List of FIFA World Cup top goalscorers
