= Carlos Padín =

Galician association football player

Personal information
- Full name: Carlos Padín Busto
- Date of birth: 15 October 1974 (age 52)
- Place of birth: Catoira, Galicia
- Height: 1.75 m (5 ft 9 in)
- Position: Midfielder

Senior career*
| Years | Team | Apps | (Gls) |
| 1993–1994 | Arosa | 32 | (5) |
| 1995–1996 | Pontevedra | 32 | (8) |
| 1996–1999 | Deportivo de La Coruña B | 61 | (10) |
| 1997–1998 | Deportivo de La Coruña | 2 | (0) |
| 1999–2000 | Racing de Ferrol | 36 | (8) |
| 2000–2001 | Lleida | 18 | (0) |
| 2001–2002 | Logroñés | 29 | (6) |
| 2002–2005 | Pontevedra | 75 | (15) |
| 2005–2007 | Ourense | 68 | (11) |
| 2009–2011 | Pontevedra | 24 | (0) |
- * Club domestic league appearances and goals

Carlos Padín (born 15 October 1974) is a Galician former footballer who played as a midfielder. He played for several clubs including Deportivo de La Coruña, Pontevedra and Ourense. He has made over 400 appearances in his career, mostly in the Segunda División B.

== Early life ==
Padín was born in Catoira, Galicia. He trained in the youth system with SD Catoira in his hometown.

== Club career ==
=== 1993–1999 ===
In 1993, Padín joined Arosa and debuted in Segunda División B for the 1993–94 season.

He signed with Pontevedra for the 1995–96 season in Segunda División B, scoring 8 goals in 34 games in the league and the Copa del Rey.

In 1996, he signed with Deportivo La Coruña. playing 61 matches and scoring 10 goals for the reserve team, Deportivo Fabril, for three seasons. He also made 2 appearances in the La Liga for the primary team – his debut on 14 February 1998, under coach José Manuel Corral, in a 1–0 defeat against Real Valladolid at the Estadio José Zorrilla stadium, and a 3–0 home victory against Athletic Club in Riazor, in which he appeared as a substitute.

He left Deportivo La Coruña for Racing de Ferrol in 1999. In the one season he played for the club, he made 38 appearances and scored 9 goals, helping the club gain promotion to the Segunda División.

=== 2000–2009 ===
In the 2000–01 season, Padín played for UE Lleida, making 18 appearances in the Segunda División and 1 in the Copa del Rey. Later, he joined CD Logroñés, for whom he scored 6 goals in 29 matches in the Segunda División B.

In 2002, he returned to Pontevedra, becoming a regular starter and scoring 10 goals in the 2002–03 season of Segunda División B under José Aurelio Gay as his head coach, finishing the season as the team's second-top scorer. In his second season, he helped the club to gain promotion to Segunda División after nearly three decades of the club not participating in the league. Padín was named the captain for the 2004–05 season, in which he played 15 games, and wore the number 10 jersey.

Between 2005 and 2007, he played for CD Ourense, scoring 13 goals in 76 matches. Following that, he returned to Arosa in the Tercera División for two seasons, 12 years after leaving the club. He was one of the top scorers for the club in his first season, scoring 10 goals. He later joined SD Órdenes for the 2008–09 season, finishing at 13th place and avoiding relegation by six points.

=== 2010–2019 ===
He rejoined Pontevedra again for the third time in March 2010, playing 29 matches before leaving the club in January 2011. He played a total of 154 games and scored 25 goals during his time at Pontevedra. Later, he returned to Órdenes in the Tercera División, where he played until 2013, accumulating 116 appearances.

In 2013, he joined CD Lalín in the same division and helped the club to reach the promotion play-offs to Segunda División B. He played another season with the club, making 68 appearances and scoring 11 goals.

Post-2015, he played for several lower-level clubs, before returning to SD Catoira, in 2019, at the age of 45.

== Career statistics ==
=== Club ===
| Club | Season | League | | | Copa del Rey | | Copa Federación de España | | Total | |
| Club | Season | Division (Note: Appearances and goals in the Tercera División are not included.) | Apps | Goals | Apps | Goals | Apps | Goals | Apps | Goals |
|---|---|---|---|---|---|---|---|---|---|---|
| Arosa | 1993–94 | Segunda División B | 32 | 5 | 6 | 0 | 0 | 0 | 38 | 5 |
| Pontevedra | 1995–96 | Segunda División B | 32 | 8 | 2 | 0 | 0 | 0 | 34 | 8 |
| Pontevedra | 2002–03 | Segunda División B | 31 | 10 | 1 | 1 | 3 | 0 | 35 | 11 |
| Pontevedra | 2003–04 | Segunda División B | 29 | 5 | 2 | 0 | 0 | 0 | 31 | 5 |
| Pontevedra | 2004–05 | Segunda División | 15 | 0 | 2 | 0 | 0 | 0 | 17 | 0 |
| Pontevedra | 2009–10 | Segunda División B | 7 | 0 | 0 | 0 | 0 | 0 | 7 | 0 |
| Pontevedra | 2010–11 | Segunda División B | 17 | 0 | 1 | 0 | 0 | 0 | 18 | 0 |
| Pontevedra | Total | | 131 | 23 | 8 | 1 | 3 | 0 | 142 | 24 |
| Deportivo de La Coruña B | 1996–97 | Segunda División B | 14 | 3 | 0 | 0 | 0 | 0 | 14 | 3 |
| Deportivo de La Coruña B | 1997–98 | Segunda División B | 28 | 6 | 0 | 0 | 0 | 0 | 28 | 6 |
| Deportivo de La Coruña B | 1998–99 | Segunda División B | 19 | 1 | 0 | 0 | 0 | 0 | 19 | 1 |
| Deportivo de La Coruña B | Total | | 61 | 10 | 0 | 0 | 0 | 0 | 61 | 10 |
| Deportivo de La Coruña | 1997–98 | La Liga | 2 | 0 | 0 | 0 | 0 | 0 | 2 | 0 |
| Racing de Ferrol | 1999–00 | Segunda División B | 36 | 8 | 1 | 0 | 1 | 1 | 38 | 9 |
| Lleida | 2000–01 | Segunda División | 18 | 0 | 1 | 0 | 0 | 0 | 19 | 0 |
| Logroñés | 2001–02 | Segunda División B | 29 | 6 | 1 | 0 | 0 | 0 | 30 | 6 |
| Ourense | 2005–06 | Segunda División B | 34 | 5 | 2 | 1 | 6 | 1 | 42 | 7 |
| Ourense | 2006–07 | Segunda División B | 34 | 6 | 0 | 0 | 0 | 0 | 34 | 6 |
| Ourense | Total | | 68 | 11 | 2 | 1 | 6 | 1 | 76 | 13 |
| Career total | | | 377 | 63 | 19 | 2 | 10 | 2 | 406 | 67 |
