= Pablo Pinillos =

Spanish former footballer (born 1974)

Personal information
- Full name: Pablo Pinillos Caro
- Date of birth: 9 July 1974 (age 52)
- Place of birth: Murillo de Río Leza, Spain
- Height: 1.73 m (5 ft 8 in)
- Position: Right-back

Senior career*
Years	Team	Apps	(Gls)
1995–1996	Calahorra	35	(5)
1996–1997	Pontevedra	34	(0)
1997–1999	Deportivo B	65	(1)
1997–1998	Deportivo La Coruña	7	(0)
1999–2000	Toledo	40	(0)
2000–2003	Compostela	110	(2)
2003–2005	Levante	65	(0)
2005–2011	Racing Santander	172	(3)
Total		528	(11)
- * Club domestic league appearances and goals

Pablo Pinillos Caro (born 9 July 1974) is a Spanish former professional footballer who played as a right-back.

In a 16-year career, he appeared in 213 La Liga games over the course of eight seasons (three goals), mainly representing Racing de Santander.

== Club career ==
=== Early years ===
Born in Murillo de Río Leza, La Rioja, Pinillos played professionally for modest clubs in his early years, working as a bricklayer before arriving at Segunda División B team Pontevedra CF in 1996, eight hours a day.

After an uneventful two-year stint with Deportivo de La Coruña, he moved to Segunda División sides CD Toledo, SD Compostela and Levante UD, achieving La Liga promotion at the end of the 2003–04 season with the latter.

=== Racing Santander ===
Upon Levante's 2005 relegation, Pinillos joined Cantabria's Racing de Santander, where he coincided with former Levante coach Manuel Preciado. There, he was an undisputed defensive starter and one of the team's captains, being instrumental in their 2007–08 historic qualification to the UEFA Cup – 32 matches, 2,716 minutes.

In the following campaign, the 34-year-old Pinillos played 29 league games plus three in the continental competition, as Racing finished in 12th position. He scored his first goal in the top flight on 26 April 2009, but in a 2–1 away loss against Athletic Bilbao.

In early July 2011, after 191 official appearances with Racing (and 20 during the season as they again retained their division status), Pinillos retired from football at the age of 37, having taken part in 354 matches both major levels of Spanish football combined. He immediately joined the club's coaching staff.

After the dismissal of manager Juanjo González on 7 March 2012, Pinillos was promoted to caretaker manager alongside Fede Castaños until the end of the campaign. Shortly after, however, Álvaro Cervera was appointed as the new coach.

== Honours ==
Calahorra

- Tercera División: 1995–96

Levante

- Segunda División: 2003–04
