= José Manuel Corral (footballer) =

Spanish footballer and manager

Personal information
- Full name: José Manuel Corral García
- Date of birth: 8 December 1952 (age 73)
- Place of birth: A Coruña, Spain
- Height: 1.71 m (5 ft 7 1/2 in)
- Position: Midfielder

Senior career*
Years	Team	Apps	(Gls)
1971–1972	Barcelona Atlètic		
1972–1973	San Andrés	12	(0)
1973–1979	Racing de Ferrol	80	(5)
1979–1981	Almería	23	(1)
Total		115	(6)

Managerial career
- 1997: Deportivo La Coruña (caretaker)
- 1997–1998: Deportivo La Coruña
- * Club domestic league appearances and goals

José Manuel Corral García (born 8 December 1952) is a Spanish former football player and manager.

Corral's playing career as a midfielder included 23 appearances and one goal during two La Liga seasons with Almería. He had a brief spell as manager of Deportivo La Coruña in the top flight during the 1997–98 season.

== Playing career ==
Corral was born in A Coruña in Galicia, but began his career with Spanish giants Barcelona. He played with their B team, Barcelona Atlètic, in the Tercera División in 1971–72, but left at the end of that season without appearing for the first team. He joined Segunda División side San Andrés, spending an uneventful season before dropping back to the Tercera División with Racing de Ferrol in 1973. Ferrol were promoted to Segunda División B in 1976–77, and followed this up by winning their group and earning a second consecutive promotion the following season. 1978–79 proved to be their only season in the second tier, as they were relegated at the first attempt, and Corral left the club that summer.

Corral then joined newly promoted La Liga side Almería, and made 23 top flight appearances over the next two seasons. Almería were relegated in 1980–81, and Corral left professional football at the age of just 28.

== Coaching career ==
After his retirement, Corral returned to his home town, becoming a coach at Deportivo La Coruña. By the mid-1990s, he was assistant to first team coach John Toshack, and after Toshack's resignation in February 1997, Corral was appointed caretaker manager. He was in charge for one match, which was a goalless draw against Atlético Madrid on 16 February, before the arrival of new head coach Carlos Alberto Silva.

Silva too was sacked in October the same year, following poor results in La Liga and elimination from the UEFA Cup at the hands of French side Auxerre. Corral was again put in charge, this time in a more permanent capacity until the end of the season. Depor won just thirteen of Corral's 36 matches in charge, and finished the season in 12th place, their lowest finish since 1991–92. He was replaced by Javier Irureta ahead of the following season, heralding the start of the most successful period in the club's history.

== Honours ==
=== Player ===
Racing de Ferrol

- Segunda División B: 1977–78

== Career statistics ==
=== As a player ===
As of 22 March 2021

Club	Season	League			Cup		Total	
Club	Season	Division	Apps	Goals	Apps	Goals	Apps	Goals
Barcelona Atlètic	1971–72	Tercera División	?	?	1	0	1	0
San Andrés	1972–73	Segunda División	12	0	2	0	14	0
Racing de Ferrol	1975–76	Tercera División	21	2	0	0	21	2
Racing de Ferrol	1976–77	Tercera División	?	?	1	0	1	0
Racing de Ferrol	1977–78	Segunda División B	28	1	3	1	31	2
Racing de Ferrol	1978–79	Segunda División	31	2	4	0	35	2
Racing de Ferrol	Total		80	5	8	1	88	6
Almería	1979–80	La Liga	19	1	4	0	23	1
Almería	1980–81	La Liga	4	0	1	0	5	0
Almería	Total		23	1	5	0	28	1
Career total			115	6	16	1	131	7

=== As a manager ===
As of 22 March 2021

Managerial record by team and tenure
Team	Nat	From	To	Record								Ref
Team	Nat	From	To	G	W	D	L	GF	GA	GD	Win %	Ref
Deportivo La Coruña	(Spain)	16 February 1997	16 February 1997	1	0	1	0	0	0	+0	0.00	
Deportivo La Coruña	(Spain)	18 October 1997	16 May 1998	36	13	11	12	41	43	−2	36.11	
Career Total				37	13	12	12	41	43	−2	35.14	—
