= Emilio Viqueira =

Spanish retired footballer (born 1974)

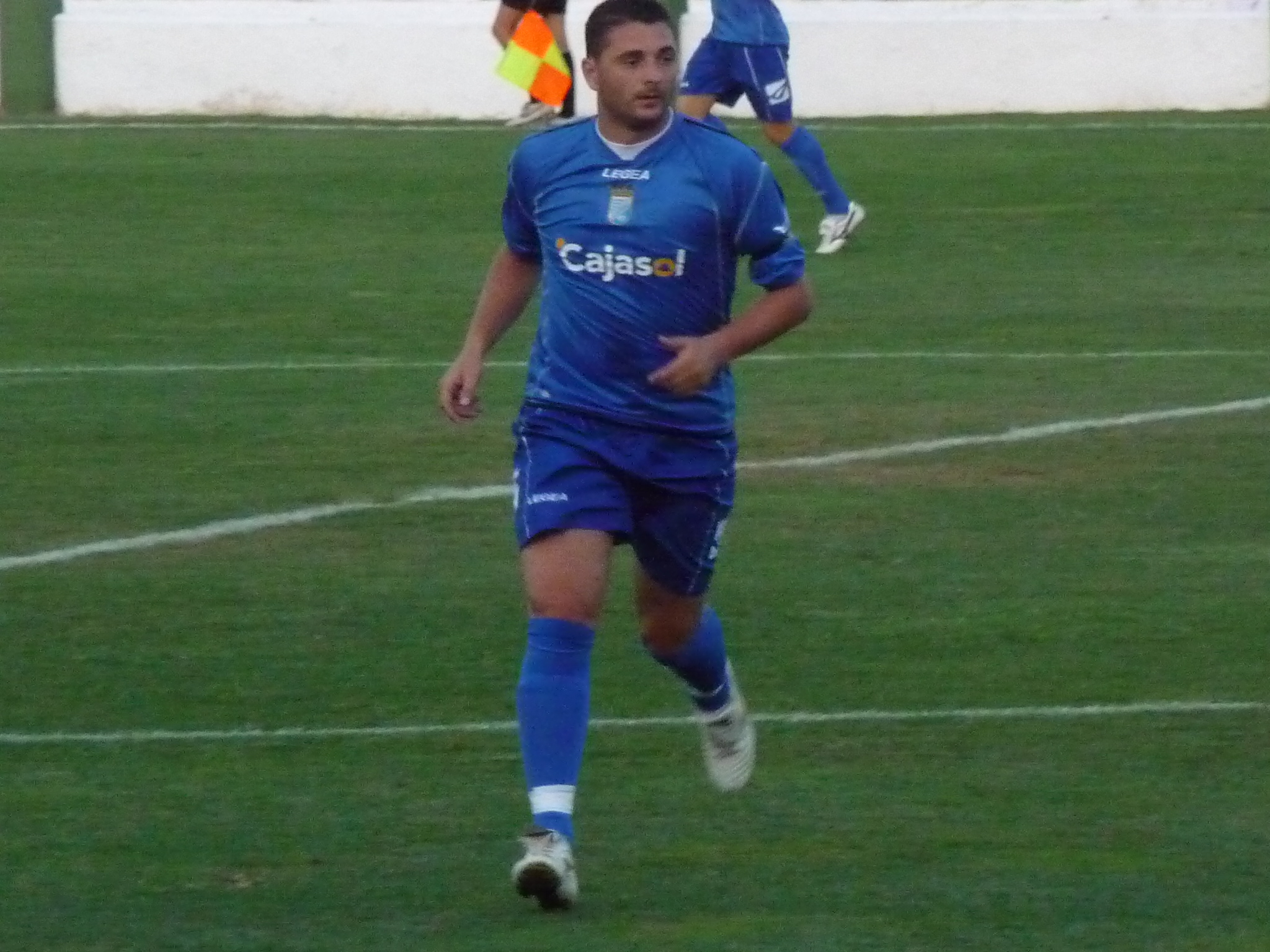
- Viqueira in 2009

Personal information
- Full name: Emilio José Viqueira Moure
- Date of birth: 20 September 1974 (age 52)
- Place of birth: Compostela, Spain
- Height: 1.83 m (6 ft 0 in)
- Position: Midfielder

Youth career
- Deportivo La Coruña

Senior career*
Years	Team	Apps	(Gls)
1993–1999	Deportivo B	158	(31)
1995–1998	Deportivo La Coruña	26	(0)
1997–1998	→ Campomaiorense (loan)	18	(3)
1999–2002	Xerez	94	(8)
2002–2007	Recreativo	159	(12)
2007–2008	Levante	9	(1)
2008	→ Xerez (loan)	20	(3)
2008–2010	Xerez	50	(0)
Total		534	(58)

International career
1990	Spain U16	2	(0)
1992	Spain U18	1	(0)
- * Club domestic league appearances and goals

Emilio José Viqueira Moure (born 20 September 1974) is a Spanish former professional footballer who played as a central midfielder.

His early career was connected with Deportivo – albeit mostly with its B team – and he also represented three other clubs in his country in a 17-year senior career, mainly Recreativo.

Over six seasons, Viqueira amassed La Liga totals of 108 games and five goals. He added 186 matches and 13 goals in the Segunda División.

== Club career ==
A skilled playmaker, Viqueira was born in Santiago de Compostela, Galicia, and he made his professional debut with local Deportivo de La Coruña, appearing in 26 matches across two seasons (19 in 1995–96, as they finished ninth). Following an abroad stint with lowly Portuguese Primeira Liga side S.C. Campomaiorense he returned to A Coruña, spending another year with the reserves.

After two seasons with Xerez CD, winning promotion to the Segunda División in 2001, Viqueira switched to neighbours Recreativo de Huelva, where he would experience his most steady and fruitful period. Playing 32 La Liga games in the 2002–03 campaign, with relegation, he made 40 appearances three years later – with three goals – as his team returned to the top division.

Viqueira joined Levante UD in July 2007 but, as many other players, would leave the club in the following January transfer window due to the Valencians' severe financial crisis, joining his former employers Xerez on loan until the rest of the second-tier season. The move was made permanent subsequently.

Viqueira was greatly hampered by injuries in 2009–10, Xerez's first ever campaign in the top flight, appearing in only 17 matches and completing just two. After the Andalusians were immediately relegated the player, aged almost 36, decided to retire, being appointed his last club's director of football shortly after; in June 2012, he stepped down from his post.

In May 2013, Viqueira became sporting director at Gimnàstic de Tarragona. He left the position five years later and, subsequently, worked in the same capacity with CD Lugo.
