= Flávio Conceição =

Brazilian footballer (born 1974)

Personal information
- Full name: Flávio da Conceição
- Date of birth: 12 June 1974 (age 52)
- Place of birth: Santa Maria da Serra, Brazil
- Height: 1.77 m (5 ft 10 in)
- Position: Midfielder

Senior career*
Years	Team	Apps	(Gls)
1992–1993	Rio Branco-SP	22	(2)
1993–1996	Palmeiras	52	(5)
1996–2000	Deportivo La Coruña	97	(9)
2000–2004	Real Madrid	45	(1)
2003–2004	→ Borussia Dortmund (loan)	14	(1)
2004–2005	Galatasaray	27	(2)
2005–2006	Panathinaikos	14	(1)
Total		271	(21)

International career
1995–2000	Brazil	45	(4)
Medal record
Representing Brazil
Men's Football
Bronze medal – third place	1996 Atlanta	Team competition
- * Club domestic league appearances and goals

Flávio da Conceição (born 12 June 1974) is a Brazilian former professional footballer who played as a defensive midfielder.

Conceição enjoyed a successful career in Spain, where he played for two clubs—including Real Madrid with whom he won six major titles—and also represented Brazil on more than 40 occasions.

== Club career ==
Born in Santa Maria da Serra, São Paulo, Conceição began his career with Rio Branco in 1992. He then joined Palmeiras a year later, and racked up over 100 first-team appearances during his spell. This caught the attention of Spanish club Deportivo La Coruña, who paid €5.2 million for him after the 1996 Summer Olympics.

Playing alongside compatriot Mauro Silva in central midfield, Conceição gradually developed into a key force in the Galicians' rise in Spanish football, as he scored four goals in 27 games in the team's 1999–2000 league conquest. This led to a 2000 move to fellow La Liga side Real Madrid, worth €26 million.

Although he appeared sparingly, Conceição did win two league titles and the 2001–02 edition of the UEFA Champions League – in that competition, he set up Steve McManaman for the closing 2–0 semi-final win against Barcelona at the Camp Nou. He spent the 2003–04 campaign on loan to Borussia Dortmund, where he was also irregularly played.

In the summer of 2004, Conceição moved to Turkey's Galatasaray. In his first and only season, he won the Turkish Cup but failed to make the Champions League, thus activating a clause in his contract which allowed him to leave, and he signed for Panathinaikos of Greece.

Afflicted with injuries and loss of form, Conceição was released and retired at the age of 32.

== International career ==
Conceição earned 45 caps for Brazil and scored four goals, and was part of the nation's 1997 and 1999 Copa América-winning sides. He was also picked for two FIFA Confederations Cup tournaments, making four appearances in the 1997 edition for the eventual champions.

In addition, Conceição won a bronze medal at the 1996 Olympics in Atlanta, but was never summoned for any FIFA World Cup.

== Career statistics ==
=== International ===
Appearances and goals by national team and year
National team	Year	Apps	Goals
Brazil	1995	2	0
Brazil	1996	8	1
Brazil	1997	14	3
Brazil	1998	7	0
Brazil	1999	12	0
Brazil	2000	2	0
Total		45	4

Scores and results list Brazil's goal tally first, score column indicates score after each Conceição goal.

List of international goals scored by Flávio Conceição
No.	Date	Venue	Opponent	Score	Result	Competition	Ref.
1	24 April 1996	FNB Stadium, Johannesburg, South Africa	South Africa	1–2	3–2	Friendly	
2	26 June 1997	Estadio Ramón Tahuichi Aguilera, Santa Cruz, Bolivia	Peru	2–0	7–0	1997 Copa América	
3	13 August 1997	Nagai Stadium, Osaka, Japan	Japan	1–0	3–0	Friendly	
4	13 August 1997	Nagai Stadium, Osaka, Japan	Japan	2–0	3–0	Friendly	

== Honours ==
Palmeiras

- Campeonato Brasileiro Série A: 1993, 1994

Deportivo de La Coruña

- La Liga: 1999–2000

Real Madrid

- La Liga: 2000–01, 2002–03
- Supercopa de España: 2001
- UEFA Champions League: 2001–02
- UEFA Super Cup: 2002
- Intercontinental Cup: 2002

Galatasaray

- Turkish Cup: 2004–05

Brazil U23

- Summer Olympic bronze medalist: 1996

Brazil

- FIFA Confederations Cup: 1997
- Copa América: 1997, 1999
- CONCACAF Gold Cup runner-up: 1996
