= Corentin Martins =

French footballer and manager (born 1969)

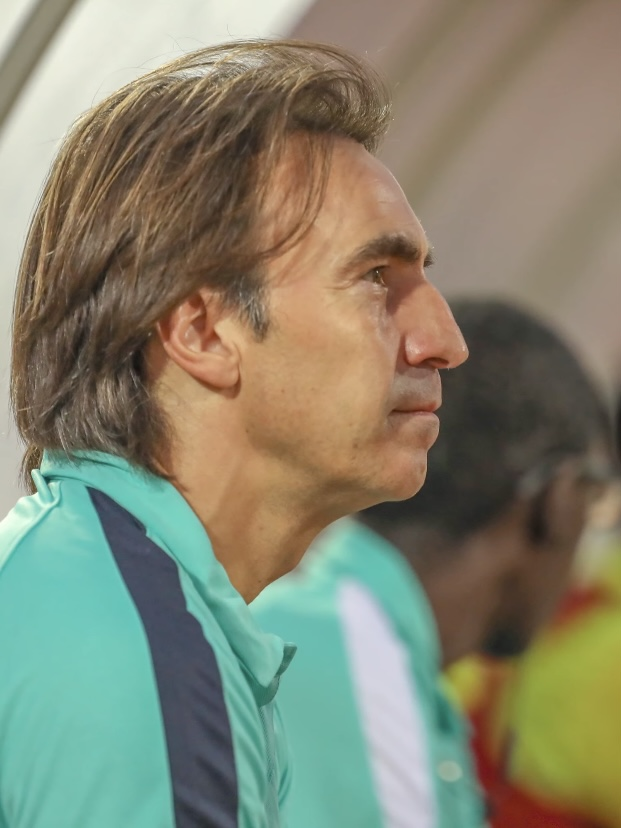
- Martins as manager of Libya

Personal information
- Full name: Corentin da Silva Martins
- Date of birth: 11 July 1969 (age 57)
- Place of birth: Brest, France
- Height: 1.70 m (5 ft 7 in)
- Position: Attacking midfielder

Team information
- Current team: Madagascar (manager)

Youth career
- Patronage Bergot
- AS Brestoise

Senior career*
Years	Team	Apps	(Gls)
1987–1991	Brest	85	(4)
1991–1996	Auxerre	187	(42)
1996–1997	Deportivo La Coruña	36	(13)
1998–2004	Strasbourg	170	(21)
1999–2000	→ Bordeaux (loan)	30	(0)
2004	Clermont	2	(0)
Total		520	(80)

International career
1993–1996	France	14	(1)
1988	Brittany indoor		

Managerial career
- 2006–2007: Quimpérois
- 2008: Brest (caretaker)
- 2008–2013: Brest (assistant)
- 2012: Brest (caretaker)
- 2013: Brest (caretaker)
- 2014–2021: Mauritania
- 2022–2023: Libya
- 2023–2024: Paradou AC
- 2024: CR Belouizdad
- 2025–: Madagascar
- * Club domestic league appearances and goals

Corentin da Silva Martins (born 11 July 1969) is a French former professional footballer who played as an attacking midfielder, currently manager of the Madagascar national team.

== Club career ==
Martins was born in Brest, Brittany of Portuguese descent. He started his professional career with hometown club Stade Brestois 29, moving to AJ Auxerre in 1991 and being part of the emergent side led by legendary Guy Roux that in 1992–93 reached the UEFA Cup semi-finals and, three years later, achieved an historic double.

On 30 May 1996, Martins signed with Deportivo de La Coruña in Spain. After an impressive first season in La Liga, he lost his place in the squad due to injuries. He returned to France and its Ligue 1 in January 1998 by joining RC Strasbourg Alsace, captaining the side against Amiens SC in the 2001 final of the Coupe de France which was won on penalties.

After a loan spell at FC Girondins de Bordeaux, Martins returned to Strasbourg and remained there until 2004, finishing his career the same year after a few months with Clermont Foot.

== International career ==
Martins earned his first cap for France on 27 March 1993, in a 1–0 win against Austria. He represented the nation at UEFA Euro 1996 and made a total of 14 appearances, but his international career was eclipsed by the emergence of Zinedine Zidane.

== Coaching career ==
Martins started his managerial career in 2006 with lowly Quimper Cornouaille FC. In the following year, he was named his first club's director of football, but had a brief spell as interim coach at the beginning of the 2008–09 campaign. He subsequently stayed on as an assistant for the Ligue 2 team.

Martins returned twice more as caretaker manager for Brest: during 2011–12, after Alex Dupont was dismissed, and again the following top-flight season when Landry Chauvin was shown the door. He managed to avert relegation on the first occasion, but failed decisively on the second, when he lost all of his eight matches in charge and suffered relegation to the second tier as last.

On 8 October 2014, Martins was appointed manager of Mauritania. In January 2019, he extended his contract until 2021.

Martins qualified the Lions of Chinguetti to the 2019 and 2021 Africa Cup of Nations, the former being a first-ever participation for the country. However, after a poor start to the 2022 FIFA World Cup qualification campaign, he was relieved of his duties.

On 11 April 2022, Martins replaced Javier Clemente at the helm of another African nation, Libya. He returned to club duties in September 2023, signing with Paradou AC of the Algerian Ligue Professionnelle 1 and leaving on 31 March 2024 by mutual agreement.

On 30 January 2025, following a brief stint in the Algerian top division with CR Belouizdad, Martins was appointed at the Madagascar national side.
