= Maikel Hermann =

Spanish footballer (born 1976)

Maikel
Personal information
- Full name: Maikel Hermann Naujoks García
- Date of birth: 18 March 1976 (age 50)
- Place of birth: Iserlohn, West Germany
- Height: 1.89 m (6 ft 2 in)
- Position: Striker

Youth career
- Arosa
- 1993–1995: Deportivo La Coruña

Senior career*
Years	Team	Apps	(Gls)
1995–1998	Deportivo B	77	(38)
1996–1998	Deportivo La Coruña	17	(1)
1998–1999	Toledo	27	(3)
1999–2000	Xerez	24	(9)
2000–2001	Getafe	32	(12)
2001	Xerez	0	(0)
2002–2003	Compostela	49	(28)
2003–2005	Terrassa	58	(20)
2005–2006	Tenerife	27	(9)
2006–2007	Lorca Deportiva	21	(2)
2007–2008	Benidorm	28	(4)
2008–2009	Ciudad Santiago	32	(11)
2009–2010	Lugo	26	(9)
2010–2011	Montañeros	23	(5)
2011–2012	Pontevedra	14	(1)
2012	Compostela		
Total		455	(152)
- * Club domestic league appearances and goals

Maikel Hermann Naujoks García (born 18 March 1976), known simply as Maikel, is a Spanish former professional footballer who played as a striker. He also held German citizenship.

== Club career ==
Born in Iserlohn, West Germany to a German father and a Spanish mother from Galicia, Maikel spent most of his career in the second (CD Toledo, Getafe CF, SD Compostela, Terrassa FC, CD Tenerife and Lorca Deportiva CF, suffering four relegations) and third divisions of Spanish football. He did appear 17 times for La Liga club Deportivo de La Coruña over three seasons.

Maikel played his first game in the top flight on 26 May 1996, coming on as a 62nd-minute substitute in a 2–2 home draw against FC Barcelona, and scored his only goal on 22 February 1998 to help the hosts to defeat Athletic Bilbao 3–0. His best input at the professional level consisted of 19 goals in 36 matches for Compostela in the 2002–03 campaign, with his team finishing in ninth position in the second tier but being relegated due to financial irregularities.
