= Jérôme Bonnissel =

French footballer (born 1973)

Personal information
- Date of birth: 16 April 1973 (age 53)
- Place of birth: Montpellier, France
- Height: 1.74 m (5 ft 8 1/2 in)
- Position: Left-back

Senior career*
Years	Team	Apps	(Gls)
1992–1996	Montpellier	119	(1)
1996–1999	Deportivo La Coruña	63	(0)
1999–2003	Bordeaux	82	(0)
2003	Rangers	3	(0)
2003–2005	Fulham	16	(0)
2006	Marseille	5	(0)
Total		288	(1)
- * Club domestic league appearances and goals

Jérôme Bonnissel (born 16 April 1973) is a French former professional footballer who played as a left-back.

== Career ==
Born in Montpellier, Bonnissel started his career with hometown club Montpellier, and proceeded to spend three seasons with La Liga club Deportivo de La Coruña.

He returned to his homeland to join Bordeaux in 1999 and stayed until he joined Rangers during the 2003 January transfer window, on a contract until the end of the season. The highlight of his time at Rangers was a start in the 2003 Scottish League Cup Final win over Celtic at Hampden Park.

In the summer of 2003 he joined Fulham on a free transfer, going on to play in their memorable 3–1 win over Manchester United at Old Trafford. On Boxing Day 2003 he was injured in a league game against Southampton and never played for Fulham again before leaving the club in 2005.

After a short six-month spell at Marseille, Bonnissel retired in 2006.

== Career statistics ==
Club performance			League		Cup		League Cup		Continental		Total	
Season	Club	League	Apps	Goals	Apps	Goals	Apps	Goals	Apps	Goals	Apps	Goals
France			League		Coupe de France		Coupe de la Ligue		Europe		Total	
1992–93	Montpellier	Division 1	18	0								
1993–94	Montpellier	Division 1	32	1								
1994–95	Montpellier	Division 1	37	0								
1995–96	Montpellier	Division 1	32	0								
Spain			League		Copa del Rey		Supercopa de España		Europe		Total	
1996–97	Deportivo La Coruña	La Liga	20	0								
1997–98	Deportivo La Coruña	La Liga	27	0								
1998–99	Deportivo La Coruña	La Liga	16	0								
France			League		Coupe de France		Coupe de la Ligue		Europe		Total	
1999–00	Girondins Bordeaux	Division 1	26	0								
2000–01	Girondins Bordeaux	Division 1	31	0								
2001–02	Girondins Bordeaux	Division 1	13	0								
2002–03	Girondins Bordeaux	Ligue 1	12	0								
Scotland			League		Scottish Cup		League Cup		Europe		Total	
2002–03	Rangers	Premier League	3	0			1	0			4	0
England			League		FA Cup		League Cup		Europe		Total	
2003–04	Fulham	Premier League	16	0								
2004–05	Fulham	Premier League	0	0								
France			League		Coupe de France		Coupe de la Ligue		Europe		Total	
2005–06	Olympique Marseille	Ligue 1	5	0								
Total	France		206	1								
Total	Spain		63	0								
Total	Scotland		2	0			1	0			3	0
Total	England		16	0								
Career total			288	1								

== Honours ==
- Rangers F.C.:
  - Scottish League Cup: 2003
