= Carlos Alberto Silva =

Brazilian football manager (1939–2017)

Personal information
- Date of birth: 14 August 1939
- Place of birth: Bom Jardim de Minas
- Date of death: 20 January 2017 (aged 77)
- Place of death: Belo Horizonte

Managerial career
- Years: Team
- 1978–1979: Guarani
- 1980–1981: São Paulo
- 1981–1982: Atlético Mineiro
- 1983–1984: Santa Cruz
- 1985–1986: Sport Recife
- 1986–1987: Cruzeiro
- 1987–1988: Brazil
- 1989–1990: São Paulo
- 1990–1991: Yomiuri FC
- 1991–1993: Porto
- 1993–1994: Cruzeiro
- 1994–1995: Corinthians
- 1995–1996: Palmeiras
- 1996: Vasco da Gama
- 1996–1997: Deportivo La Coruña
- 1997–1998: Goiás
- 1998–1999: Guarani
- 1999–2000: Santos
- 2000–2002: Guarani
- 2002–2003: Santa Clara
- 2004: América Mineiro
- 2005: Atlético Mineiro

Carlos Alberto Silva (14 August 1939 – 20 January 2017) was a Brazilian football manager.

Graduate in physical education by Universidade Federal de Minas Gerais, Silva became famous managing Guarani in its 1978 Brazilian Championship title.

Between 1987 and 1988, he managed the Brazil national team.

== Honours ==
Guarani

- Campeonato Brasileiro: 1978

São Paulo

- Campeonato Paulista: 1980, 1989

Atlético Mineiro

- Campeonato Mineiro: 1981
- Tournoi de Paris: 1982

Yomiuri FC

- Japan Soccer League: 1991

Porto

- Portuguese Liga: 1992, 1993
- Portuguese SuperCup: 1991

== Sources ==
- Enciclopédia do Futebol Brasileiro, Volume 2 – Lance, Rio de Janeiro: Aretê Editorial S/A, 2001.
