= Armando Álvarez (footballer) =

Spanish footballer (born 1970)

Personal information
- Full name: Armando Álvarez Álvarez
- Date of birth: 18 July 1970 (age 56)
- Place of birth: Colmar, France
- Height: 1.73 m (5 ft 8 in)
- Position: Right-back

Youth career
- Fortuna León

Senior career*
Years	Team	Apps	(Gls)
1988–1989	Hispano	22	(3)
1989–1992	Oviedo B	81	(14)
1992–1996	Oviedo	149	(5)
1996–1999	Deportivo La Coruña	97	(3)
1999–2001	Mallorca	31	(1)
2001–2003	Atlético Madrid	35	(0)
Total		415	(26)

International career
1996–1997	Spain	2	(0)
- * Club domestic league appearances and goals

Armando Álvarez Álvarez (born 18 July 1970) is a Spanish former professional footballer who played as a right-back.

== Honours ==
Atlético Madrid

- Segunda División: 2001–02

== See also ==
- List of Spain international footballers born outside Spain
