= Hélder (footballer, born 1971) =

Portuguese footballer and manager

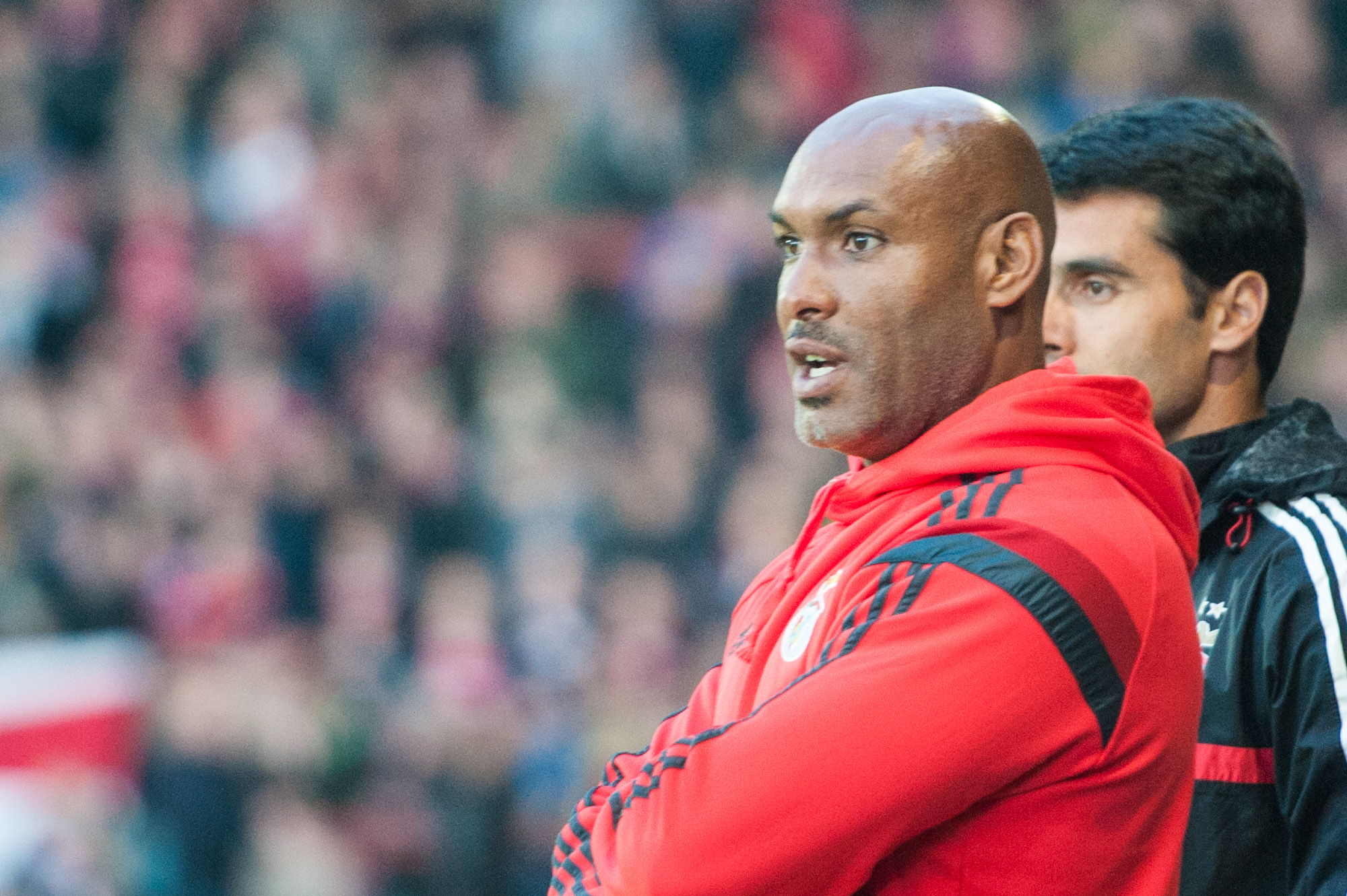
- Hélder as a coach of Benfica B in 2015

Personal information
- Full name: Hélder Marino Rodrigues Cristóvão
- Date of birth: 21 March 1971 (age 55)
- Place of birth: Luanda, Angola
- Height: 1.81 m (5 ft 11 in)
- Position: Centre-back

Youth career
- 1984–1987: Desportivo Monte Real
- 1987–1988: Tires
- 1988–1989: Estoril

Senior career*
Years	Team	Apps	(Gls)
1989–1992	Estoril	79	(5)
1992–1996	Benfica	125	(12)
1997–2002	Deportivo La Coruña	67	(1)
1999–2000	→ Newcastle United (loan)	8	(1)
2002–2004	Benfica	39	(2)
2004–2005	Paris Saint-Germain	16	(1)
2005–2006	AEL	9	(0)
Total		343	(22)

International career
1991–1992	Portugal U21	10	(2)
1992–2001	Portugal	35	(3)

Managerial career
- 2009: Estoril
- 2011: Portimonense (assistant)
- 2013–2018: Benfica B
- 2018–2019: Al Nassr (assistant)
- 2018–2019: Al Nassr (caretaker)
- 2019: Al-Ettifaq
- 2020: Dunajská Streda
- 2021: Al-Hazem
- 2023–2025: Penafiel
- * Club domestic league appearances and goals

Hélder Marino Rodrigues Cristóvão (born 21 March 1971), known simply as Hélder as a player, is a former professional footballer who played as a central defender, currently a manager.

He amassed Primeira Liga totals of 197 matches and 16 goals over eight seasons, mostly with Benfica. He also played in Spain, England, France and Greece, representing mainly Deportivo.

Born in Angola, Hélder appeared for Portugal at Euro 1996. In 2009, he started working as a manager, going on to spend several years with Benfica's reserves.

== Playing career ==
=== Club ===
Born in Luanda, Portuguese Angola, Hélder first attracted attention as a Estoril player, moving to Benfica for the 1992–93 season where he would stay the following four and a half years, mainly as a starter. In December 1996, he signed for Deportivo de La Coruña, playing 22 La Liga matches in only six months as the club finished in third position.

In November 1999, Hélder joined Newcastle United of the Premier League on loan for a fee of £500,000, making 12 official appearances and scoring in a 2–2 away draw against Sunderland in the Tyne–Wear derby the following 6 February. In that season, the Spaniards went on to conquer their first league title, with the player failing to contribute in that competition; he subsequently returned to Depor, appearing very rarely in his last year, which ended in conquest of the Copa del Rey.

For the 2002–03 campaign, aged 31, Hélder returned to Benfica, playing there two more years (winning the Taça de Portugal in 2004) and joining Paris Saint-Germain the following season, where he teamed up with compatriot Pauleta. He spent his last year at AEL in 2005–06, appearing rarely in the Super League Greece and retiring subsequently.

=== International ===
Hélder earned 35 caps for the Portugal national team, scoring three goals. His first was on 12 February 1992 in a 2–0 win over the Netherlands in an exhibition game, and his last a 4–0 loss to France in Paris on 25 April 2001, in another friendly.

Hélder represented the nation at UEFA Euro 1996, appearing in all four matches for the quarter-finalists as he started alongside Fernando Couto.

== Coaching career ==
Cristóvão began working as a manager in the summer of 2009, precisely with his first club Estoril (in the Segunda Liga). On 28 September, merely two months after being appointed, he was fired.

On 3 July 2013, Cristóvão returned to Benfica as manager of the reserve team, replacing Luís Norton de Matos. In the 2014–15 season, he led them to their second-best position in the second tier, a sixth place (fifth in 2013–14), as the highest scoring team with 81 goals.

Benfica B only managed to stave off relegation in the 2015–16 campaign in the last matchday, defeating Freamunde 5–0 at home and also benefitting from a 1–1 draw between Mafra and Aves. Cristóvão's team collected more losses (21) than wins (15), conceding 64 times whilst scoring 59; additionally, on 15 March 2016, he was suspended for 30 days after being sent off against Covilhã, which ended with a 2–2 home draw.

On 5 April 2018, Cristóvão announced he would leave Benfica at the end of the season. In August that year, he was hired as director of football and academy director at Al Nassr in the Saudi Pro League. He became caretaker manager in November after the exit of José Daniel Carreño, and relinquished that role when compatriot Rui Vitória was appointed the following January. Three months later, he was given a new job in the same league at Al-Ettifaq who had two games remaining to avoid relegation, which was finally achieved.

Cristóvão was named manager of Dunajská Streda on 6 January 2020, taking charge of the third-placed team of the Slovak Super Liga on a deal until 31 May. On 15 May, however, the club decided not to renew his contract.

On 7 June 2021, Cristóvão was appointed at newly promoted Al-Hazem in the Saudi top division. He was removed from the bottom-placed side on 27 November and replaced by Constantin Gâlcă.

Cristóvão was hired by Ismaily, placed last in the Egyptian Premier League, on 13 September 2022. His contract was terminated hours later, allegedly due to misinformation presented on his curriculum vitae by his agent.

On 30 January 2023, Hélder returned to his country's second tier, replacing Filó at 12th-placed Penafiel. Having finished the season in the same position, he signed for another year.

== Personal life ==
Cristóvão's son, Flávio, also became a professional footballer in the same position.

== Managerial statistics ==
As of match played 15 May 2025

Team	From	To	Record							
Team	From	To	G	W	D	L	GF	GA	GD	Win %
Estoril	July 2009	28 September 2009	8	1	5	2	9	12	−3	12.50
Benfica B	3 July 2013	30 June 2018	224	93	49	82	340	309	+31	41.52
Al Nassr (caretaker)	10 November 2018	10 January 2019	8	4	3	1	14	8	+6	50.00
Al-Ettifaq	19 April 2019	17 May 2019	2	0	0	2	0	6	−6	0.00
Dunajská Streda	6 January 2020	15 May 2020	5	1	3	1	4	3	+1	20.00
Al-Hazem	7 June 2021	27 November 2021	13	2	5	6	9	16	−7	15.38
Penafiel	31 January 2023	30 June 2025	89	30	21	38	107	118	−11	33.71
Total			349	131	86	132	483	472	+11	37.54

== Honours ==
Benfica

- Primeira Liga: 1993–94
- Taça de Portugal: 1992–93, 1995–96, 2003–04

Deportivo

- Copa del Rey: 2001–02
- Supercopa de España: 2000
