= Jacques Songo'o =

Cameroonian footballer (born 1964)

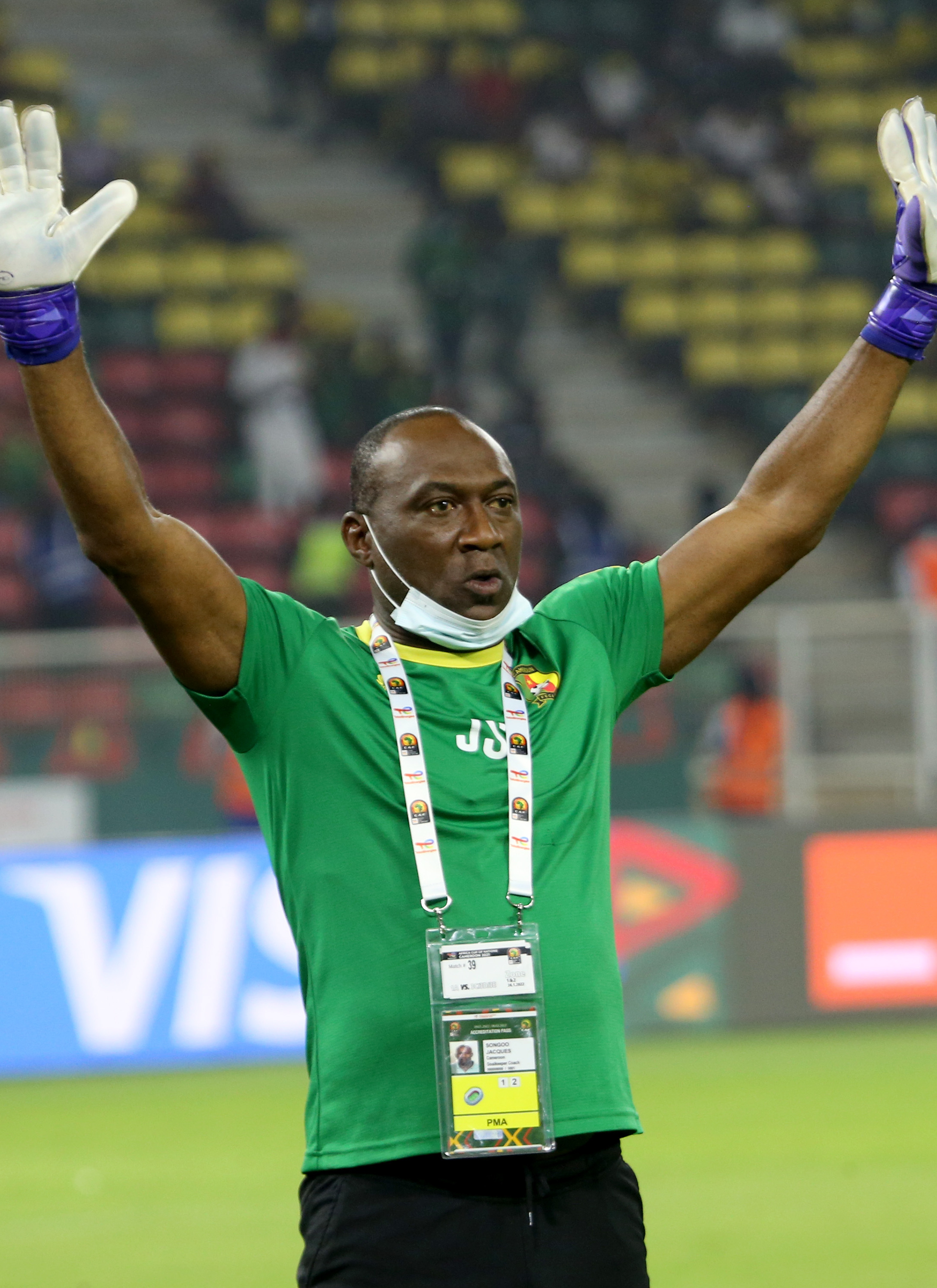
- Songo'o in 2022

Personal information
- Full name: Jacques Celestin Songo'o
- Date of birth: 17 March 1964 (age 62)
- Place of birth: Sackbayeme, Cameroon
- Height: 1.88 m (6 ft 2 in)
- Position: Goalkeeper

Youth career
- Canon Yaoundé

Senior career*
Years	Team	Apps	(Gls)
1984–1989	Canon Yaoundé		
1989–1993	Toulon	22	(0)
1992–1993	→ Le Mans (loan)	22	(0)
1993–1996	Metz	101	(0)
1996–2001	Deportivo La Coruña	150	(0)
2001–2003	Metz	26	(0)
2003–2004	Deportivo La Coruña	1	(0)
Total		322	(0)

International career
1984–2002	Cameroon	98	(0)

Managerial career
- 2010: Cameroon (caretaker)
Medal record
Men's football
Representing Cameroon
Africa Cup of Nations
Winner	1984 Ivory Coast
Winner	1988 Morocco
Winner	2002 Mali
Runner-up	1986 Egypt
Afro-Asian Cup of Nations
Winner	1985 Cameroon
- * Club domestic league appearances and goals

Jacques Celestin Songo'o (born 17 March 1964) is a Cameroonian former professional footballer who played as a goalkeeper. He most recently worked as the goalkeeping coach of the Cameroon national team.

He spent the vast majority of his professional career in France and Spain, most notably with Deportivo de La Coruña, appearing in more than 200 official games over the course of six seasons and winning the 1999–2000 La Liga.

Songo'o represented the Cameroon national team at four World Cups, being first-choice in 1998.

== Club career ==
Songo'o was born in Sackbayeme, in the Yaoundé suburbs. After first establishing himself as a professional in France, with Ligue 1 club FC Metz, he was voted Best African Goalkeeper in 1996, then arguably lived his most successful period at Spain's Deportivo de La Coruña.

With the Galicians, Songo'o won the 1996–97 edition of the Ricardo Zamora Trophy (awarded to the best goalkeeper of the season), and was his side's undisputed starter in his first four years, which ended with a first-ever title in La Liga. When Depor bought José Francisco Molina in 2000, he soon lost his place and was eventually transferred to old team Metz; on 13 February of that year, from a corner kick, he was supposed to have scored his first career goal, but it was wrongfully disallowed in a 1–0 away loss against CD Numancia.

After two seasons, Songo'o returned to Deportivo and A Coruña, again in a free transfer. He settled there after having retired from football, aged 40.

== International career ==
Songo'o featured for Cameroon in every FIFA World Cup from 1990 to 2002, although only as first-choice in 1998. For much of his career he was in competition with Thomas N’Kono and Joseph-Antoine Bell. He was also a member of the squad that competed at the 1984 Summer Olympics in Los Angeles.

After retiring in 2004, Songo'o was hired as the national team's goalkeeper coach. He left the position in 2006, returning four years later as a replacement for Thomas N'Kono.

In the 2010 World Cup in South Africa, Songo'o was part of Paul Le Guen's coaching staff. After the tournament, which ended in the group stage, he led Cameroon to a 3–0 victory over Poland on an interim basis, the nation's first win in ten games.

Songo'o returned for a third spell in the same capacity in September 2019, now under newly hired manager Toni Conceição.

== Personal life ==
Songo'o also held French citizenship. Both of his sons, Franck and Yann, were also professional footballers.

== Honours ==
Canon

- Elite One: 1984–85, 1985–86
- Cameroonian Cup: 1985–86

Metz

- Coupe de la Ligue: 1995–96

Deportivo

- La Liga: 1999–2000
- Supercopa de España: 2000

Cameroon

- African Cup of Nations: 1984, 1988, 2002; runner-up, 1986
- Afro-Asian Cup of Nations: 1985

Individual

- Ricardo Zamora Trophy: 1996–97
