= 1994–95 Deportivo de La Coruña season =

Deportivo de La Coruña
1994–95 season
- President: Augusto César Lendoiro
- Manager: Arsenio Iglesias
- Stadium: Estadio Riazor
- La Liga: Runners-up
- Copa del Rey: Winners (in UEFA Cup Winners' Cup)
- UEFA Cup: Third round
- Top goalscorer: League: Bebeto (16); All: Bebeto (22)
Home colours	Away colours

Deportivo La Coruña's 1994–95 season included its 30th appearance in La Liga, where it finished as runner-up. The club also competed in the Copa del Rey and the UEFA Cup.

== Summary ==
Arsenio Iglesias guided Deportivo to the most successful season in their history, up to that point, in 1994–95. They matched their performance from the previous season in both La Liga, where they finished as runners-up four points behind champions Real Madrid, and the UEFA Cup, where they were eliminated after extra time in the third round by German side Borussia Dortmund. However, their greatest success came in the Copa del Rey. The first cup final in their history saw them face Valencia at the Santiago Bernabéu in Madrid on 24 June, and the first half went well as Javier Manjarín gave Depor the lead after 35 minutes. Valencia equalised through Predrag Mijatović with twenty minutes to play, but nine minutes later the match was suspended due to heavy rain and hail.

The remaining eleven minutes were played three days later, and Deportivo retook the lead just two minutes after the restart through Alfredo Santaelena. They held on to win 2–1 and claim their first major trophy in the most unusual of circumstances. Iglesias retired from coaching at the end of the season, therefore, he was replaced by Welshman John Toshack- who had previously been manager of Real Sociedad- and ending the "Super Depor" era (1992–95).

== Players ==
=== Squad ===
Note: Flags indicate national team as defined under FIFA eligibility rules; some limited exceptions apply. Players may hold more than one non-FIFA nationality.

No.	Pos.	Nation	Player
—	GK	ESP	Juan Canales
—	GK	ESP	Agustín Elduayen
—	GK	ESP	Francisco Liaño
—	DF	YUG	Miroslav Đukić
—	DF	ESP	Paco Jémez
—	DF	ESP	Luis López Rekarte
—	DF	ESP	Nando
—	DF	ESP	José Luis Ribera
—	DF	ESP	Francisco Villarroya
—	DF	ESP	Voro
—	MF	ESP	Adolfo Aldana

No.	Pos.	Nation	Player
—	MF	ESP	Alfredo Santaelena
—	MF	ESP	Donato
—	MF	ESP	Fran (captain)
—	MF	ESP	Javier Manjarín
—	MF	ESP	José Ramón
—	MF	BRA	Mauro Silva
—	MF	ESP	Emilio Viqueira
—	FW	BRA	Bebeto
—	FW	ESP	Claudio Barragán
—	FW	ESP	Julio Salinas

==== Left club during season ====
Note: Flags indicate national team as defined under FIFA eligibility rules; some limited exceptions apply. Players may hold more than one non-FIFA nationality.

No. / Pos. / Nation / Player; — / FW / BUL / Emil Kostadinov (to Bayern Munich)	No. / Pos. / Nation / Player; — / FW / ESP / Pedro Riesco (on loan to Real Valladolid)

=== Transfers ===
==== In ====
Pos	Player	From	Notes
Summer
DF	(Spain) Francisco Villarroya	(Spain) Real Madrid	
FW	(Bulgaria) Emil Kostadinov	(Portugal) Porto	
FW	(Spain) Julio Salinas	(Spain) Barcelona	

==== Out ====
Pos	Player	To	Notes
Summer
DF	(Spain) Mariano Hoyas	(Spain) Celta Vigo	
DF	(Spain) Ricardo Serna	(Spain) Mallorca	
MF	(Spain) Marcos Vales	(Spain) Sporting de Gijón	Free
Winter
FW	(Bulgaria) Emil Kostadinov	(Germany) Bayern Munich	
FW	(Spain) Pedro Riesco	(Spain) Real Valladolid	Loan

== Competitions ==
=== La Liga ===
==== League table ====
Pos	Team	Pld	W	D	L	GF	GA	GD	Pts	Qualification or relegation
1	Real Madrid (C)	38	23	9	6	76	29	+47	55	Qualification for the Champions League group stage
2	Deportivo La Coruña	38	20	11	7	68	32	+36	51	Qualification for the Cup Winners' Cup first round (Note: Deportivo entered UEFA Cup Winners' Cup as winners of 1994–95 Copa del Rey.)
3	Real Betis	38	15	16	7	46	25	+21	46 (Note: BAR 1–1 BET; BET 1–1 BAR)	Qualification for the UEFA Cup first round
4	Barcelona	38	18	10	10	60	45	+15	46	Qualification for the UEFA Cup first round
5	Sevilla (Note: On July 31, 1995, Sevilla and Celta Vigo were relegated to Segunda División B for not providing documentation (an audit) nor making their payments to the Royal Spanish Football Federation within the time limit. The two best qualified teams to be relegated, Albacete and Valladolid were readmitted to La Liga. Later, Sevilla and Celta Vigo claimed that according to the law they had another 15 working days because they made allegations days before. Finally, the solution was to not relegate any involved team and expand the league to 22 teams for the next two seasons.)	38	16	11	11	55	41	+14	43 (Note: SEV: 7 pts; ESP: 3 pts; ZAR: 2 pts)	Qualification for the UEFA Cup first round

Source: LFP
Rules for classification: 1) points; 2) head-to-head points; 3) head-to-head goal difference; 4) head-to-head goals scored; 5) goal difference; 6) number of goals scored.
(C) Champions

==== Positions by round ====
Team ╲ Round	1	2	3	4	5	6	7	8	9	10	11	12	13	14	15	16	17	18	19	20	21	22	23	24	25	26	27	28	29	30	31	32	33	34	35	36	37	38
Deportivo La Coruña	5	3	1	2	1	1	2	1	2	1	4	2	2	2	3	3	2	2	2	2	2	2	3	3	3	4	2	2	2	2	2	2	2	2	2	2	2	2

Leader, Champions League group stage
UEFA Cup first round

==== Matches ====
4 September 1994 1	Athletic Bilbao	0–2	Deportivo La Coruña	Bilbao, Spain
	Mendiguren (yellow card)	Report	71' Ramón; 82' Donato; (yellow card) Voro	Stadium: San Mamés; Referee: Juan Andújar Oliver

10 September 1994 2	Deportivo La Coruña	2–1	Sporting Gijón	A Coruña, Spain
	Ramón 15'; Donato 20'; Manjarín (yellow card)	Report	53' García; (yellow card) Castaño; (yellow card) Vales	Stadium: Estadio Riazor; Referee: Antonio Martin Navarrete

18 September 1994 3	Racing Santander	1–2	Deportivo La Coruña	Santander, Spain
	Villabona 23'; Merino (yellow card)	Report	44' Salinas; 86' Manjarín	Stadium: El Sardinero; Referee: Manuel Díaz Vega

24 September 1994 4	Deportivo La Coruña	1–1	Español	A Coruña, Spain
	Bebeto 59'; Fran (yellow card); Nando (yellow card)	Report	44' Arteaga; (yellow card) Francisco López; (yellow card) Herrera; (yellow card) Roberto	Stadium: Estadio Riazor; Referee: Francisco Santamaría Uzqueda

1 October 1994 5	Compostela	0–1	Deportivo La Coruña	Santiago de Compostela, Spain
	Fabiano (yellow card); Villena (red card)	Report	65' Bebeto; (yellow card) Đukić; (yellow card) Fran	Stadium: Estadio Multiusos de San Lázaro; Referee: José Manuel Andradas Asurmendi

9 October 1994 6	Deportivo La Coruña	3–3	Real Zaragoza	A Coruña, Spain
	Donato 17' (pen.); Barragán 78', 85' (yellow card); Canales (yellow card); Đukić (yellow card); Ribera (red card)	Report	21' Poyet; 37', 48' (pen.) Aragón; (yellow card) Belsué; (yellow card) (yellow-red card) Cáceres; (yellow card) (yellow-red card) Esnáider; (yellow card) Nayim	Stadium: Estadio Riazor; Referee: Juan Andújar Oliver

15 October 1994 7	Atlético Madrid	1–1	Deportivo La Coruña	Madrid, Spain
	Valencia 44' de la Sagra (yellow card); Rocha (yellow card); Solozábal (yellow card); Tomás Reñones (yellow card)	Report	53' Kostadinov; (yellow card) Nando	Stadium: Vicente Calderón Stadium; Referee: José Pajares Paz

23 October 1994 8	Deportivo La Coruña	3–1	Valencia	A Coruña, Spain
	Donato 18' (pen.); Bebeto 50', 64'; Fran (yellow card); Kostadinov (yellow card)	Report	55' Robert Fernández; (yellow card) Mijatović	Stadium: Estadio Riazor; Referee: José Rubio Valdivieso

29 October 1994 9	Tenerife	1–1	Deportivo La Coruña	Santa Cruz de Tenerife, Spain
	Pizzi 47' (yellow card); Gómez (yellow card)	Report	32' Aldana; (yellow card) Đukić; (yellow card) Ribera	Stadium: Heliodoro Rodríguez López; Referee: José María García-Aranda

6 November 1994 10	Deportivo La Coruña	3–1	Real Sociedad	A Coruña, Spain
	Fran 41'; Kostadinov 65'; Aldana 88'; Voro (yellow card)	Report	85' (yellow card) Kodro	Stadium: Estadio Riazor; Referee: Juan Brito Arceo

19 November 1994 11	Real Oviedo	2–0	Deportivo La Coruña	Oviedo, Spain
	Cristóbal 3'; Rivas 89'; Armando Álvarez (yellow card); Berto (yellow card); Carlos (yellow card); Janković (yellow card); Jokanović (yellow card); Sietes (yellow card)	Report	(red card) Kostadinov; (yellow card) Nando; (yellow card) Ribera; (yellow card) Salinas	Stadium: Estadio Carlos Tartiere; Referee: Juan Ansuátegui Roca

27 November 1994 12	Deportivo La Coruña	4–0	Real Valladolid	A Coruña, Spain
	Barragán 10'; Manjarín 22'; Salinas 64', 67'; Donato (yellow card)	Report	(yellow card) Ferreras; (yellow card) Gracia; (yellow card) Matosas	Stadium: Estadio Riazor; Referee: Alonso Gómez López

3 December 1994 13	Barcelona	1–1	Deportivo La Coruña	Barcelona, Spain
	Koeman 33'; Abelardo Fernández (yellow card); Bakero (yellow card); Sánchez Jara (yellow card)	Report	89' Salinas; (yellow card) Đukić; (yellow card) Voro	Stadium: Camp Nou; Referee: José María García-Aranda

11 December 1994 14	Deportivo La Coruña	5–1	Sevilla	A Coruña, Spain
	Salinas 4', 44'; Aldana 37'; Fran 38', 86'	Report	88' Šuker; (yellow card) (yellow-red card) Moya; (yellow card) Prieto	Stadium: Estadio Riazor; Referee: José Pajares Paz

21 December 1994 15	Deportivo La Coruña	1–2	Celta Vigo	A Coruña, Spain
	Bebeto 77'; Đukić (yellow card); Kostadinov (yellow card)	Report	2' (yellow card) Gudelj; 52' Losada; (yellow card) Hoyas; (yellow card) Merino; (yellow card) Ratković	Stadium: Estadio Riazor; Referee: Manuel Díaz Vega

8 January 1995 16	Real Betis	0–0	Deportivo La Coruña	Seville, Spain
		Report		Stadium: Benito Villamarín; Referee: Celino Gracia Redondo

14 January 1995 17	Deportivo La Coruña	0–0	Real Madrid	A Coruña, Spain
	Nando (yellow card); Silva (yellow card)	Report	(yellow card) Hierro; (yellow card) Milla	Stadium: Estadio Riazor; Referee: Antonio López Nieto

21 January 1995 18	Logroñés	0–1	Deportivo La Coruña	Logroño, Spain
	Navarro (yellow card)	Report	8' Bebeto; (yellow card) Ribera; (yellow card) Voro	Stadium: Estadio Las Gaunas; Referee: Arturo Daudén Ibáñez

29 January 1995 19	Deportivo La Coruña	2–1	Albacete	A Coruña, Spain
	Nando 1'; Bebeto 34' (yellow card); Fran (red card); Manjarín (yellow card); Ribera (yellow card); Villarroya (yellow card)	Report	69' (pen.) Zalazar; (yellow card) Dertycia; (yellow card) Óscar García; (yellow card) Santi; (yellow card) (yellow-red card) Tomàs	Stadium: Estadio Riazor; Referee: José María García-Aranda

4 February 1995 20	Deportivo La Coruña	0–0	Athletic Bilbao	A Coruña, Spain
	Barragán (yellow card); Nando (yellow card); Voro (yellow card)	Report	(yellow card) Garitano; (yellow card) (yellow-red card) Goikoetxea; (yellow card) Urrutia	Stadium: Estadio Riazor; Referee: José Núñez Manrique

12 February 1995 21	Sporting Gijón	3–1	Deportivo La Coruña	Gijón, Spain
	Pier 19'; Morales 59', 66'; Castaño (yellow card); Pérez (yellow card) (yellow-red card); Raúl (yellow card)	Report	32' Donato; (yellow card) Bebeto; (yellow card) Manjarín	Stadium: El Molinón; Referee: Juan Andújar Oliver

19 February 1995 22	Deportivo La Coruña	3–0	Racing Santander	A Coruña, Spain
	Voro 21' (yellow card); Donato 55' (pen.); Bebeto 62'	Report	(yellow card) Alfaro; (yellow card) Carreras	Stadium: Estadio Riazor; Referee: Celino Gracia Redondo

26 February 1995 23	Español	1–0	Deportivo La Coruña	Barcelona, Spain
	Lluis 84'; Răducioiu (yellow card)	Report	(yellow card) López Rekarte	Stadium: Sarrià Stadium; Referee: Manuel Díaz Vega

5 March 1995 24	Deportivo La Coruña	1–0	Compostela	A Coruña, Spain
	Salinas 23'; Alfredo Santaelena (yellow card)	Report	(yellow card) Abadía; (yellow card) Bellido; (yellow card) Fabiano; (yellow card) Goio	Stadium: Estadio Riazor; Referee: Antonio Martin Navarrete

12 March 1995 25	Real Zaragoza	1–0	Deportivo La Coruña	Zaragoza, Spain
	Pardeza 27'; Aguado (yellow card) (yellow-red card); Aragón (yellow card) (yellow-red card); Poyet (yellow card)	Report	(red card) Donato; (yellow card) Fran; (yellow card) Voro	Stadium: La Romareda; Referee: Juan Brito Arceo

18 March 1995 26	Deportivo La Coruña	0–1	Atlético Madrid	A Coruña, Spain
	Manjarín (yellow card); Nando (yellow card); Voro (yellow card)	Report	68' Manolo; (yellow card) Geli; (yellow card) (yellow-red card) Muñoz; (yellow card) Rocha; (yellow card) Tomás Reñones	Stadium: Estadio Riazor; Referee: Juan Ansuátegui Roca

1 April 1995 27	Valencia	1–2	Deportivo La Coruña	Valencia, Spain
	Penev 89'	Report	38' Aldana; 48' (o.g.) Otero; (yellow card) Bebeto; (yellow card) Donato; (yellow card) Salinas	Stadium: Mestalla; Referee: José Manuel Andradas Asurmendi

9 April 1995 28	Deportivo La Coruña	4–1	Tenerife	A Coruña, Spain
	Bebeto 6', 32', 75'; Fran 78'; Donato (yellow card); Đukić (yellow card)	Report	51' (yellow card) Juanele; (yellow card) del Solar; (yellow card) Paqui	Stadium: Estadio Riazor; Referee: César Barrenechea Montero

16 April 1995 29	Real Sociedad	1–3	Deportivo La Coruña	San Sebastián, Spain
	Imanol Alguacil 48'; Imaz (yellow card)	Report	30', 54' Fran; 81' (yellow card) Bebeto; (yellow card) Ribera; (yellow card) Voro	Stadium: Anoeta; Referee: Francisco Santamaría Uzqueda

23 April 1995 30	Deportivo La Coruña	2–2	Real Oviedo	A Coruña, Spain
	Salinas 35'; Bebeto 39'; Fran (yellow card)	Report	47' (yellow card) Oli; 85' Prosinečki; (yellow card) (yellow-red card) Armando Álvarez; (yellow card) Cristóbal; (yellow card) Rivas	Stadium: Estadio Riazor; Referee: Alonso Gómez López

30 April 1995 31	Real Valladolid	0–0	Deportivo La Coruña	Valladolid, Spain
		Report	(yellow card) Đukić; (yellow card) Ribera	Stadium: José Zorrilla; Referee: Miguel Marín López

6 May 1995 32	Deportivo La Coruña	1–0	Barcelona	A Coruña, Spain
	Donato 4' (pen.); Fran (yellow card); Đukić (yellow card); Manjarín (yellow card); Voro (yellow card)	Report	(yellow card) Bakero; (yellow card) Lopetegui; (yellow card) Sergi	Stadium: Estadio Riazor; Referee: Arturo Daudén Ibáñez

13 May 1995 33	Sevilla	0–0	Deportivo La Coruña	Seville, Spain
		Report		Stadium: Ramón Sánchez Pizjuán; Referee: Juan Brito Arceo

21 May 1995 34	Celta Vigo	0–2	Deportivo La Coruña	Vigo, Spain
	Hoyas (yellow card); Merino (yellow card)	Report	15' Manjarín; 67' Alfredo Santaelena; (yellow card) Aldana; (yellow card) Nando	Stadium: Balaídos; Referee: José Victor Esquinas Torres

27 May 1995 35	Deportivo La Coruña	2–0	Real Betis	A Coruña, Spain
	Aldana 44', 67'	Report	(yellow card) Jaime Quesada	Stadium: Estadio Riazor; Referee: José Manuel Andradas Asurmendi

3 June 1995 36	Real Madrid	2–1	Deportivo La Coruña	Madrid, Spain
	Amavisca 38'; Zamorano 85' (yellow card); Enrique (yellow card); Hierro (yellow card); Redondo (yellow card); Sánchez Flores (yellow card)	Report	68' Bebeto; (yellow card) Nando; (yellow card) Ramón; (yellow card) Ribera	Stadium: Santiago Bernabéu; Referee: Antonio López Nieto

10 June 1995 37	Deportivo La Coruña	5–0	Logroñés	A Coruña, Spain
	Đukić 6'; Bebeto 21', 41'; Fran 35'; Salinas 39'	Report		Stadium: Estadio Riazor; Referee: Alonso Gómez López

18 June 1995 38	Albacete Balompié	2–8	Deportivo La Coruña	Albacete, Spain
	Andonov 17'; Zalazar 56'; Dertycia (yellow card); Fradera (yellow card); Santi (yellow card); Tomàs (yellow card) (yellow-red card)	Report	7' Đukić; 42', 74' Manjarín; 52', 76', 89' Salinas; 70' Ramón; 73' Donato; (yellow card) Nando; (yellow card) Ribera	Stadium: Estadio Carlos Belmonte; Referee: José Núñez Manrique

=== UEFA Cup ===
==== First round ====
13 September 1994 First leg	Rosenborg (Norway)	1–0	(Spain) Deportivo La Coruña	Trondheim, Norway
	Løken 52'	Report	(yellow card) Donato; (yellow card) Manjarín; (yellow card) Ribera	Stadium: Lerkendal; Referee: Sergei Khusainov (Russia)

27 September 1994 Second leg	Deportivo La Coruña (Spain)	4–1 (a.e.t.)	(Norway) Rosenborg	A Coruña, Spain
	Bebeto 81', 98', 114'; Donato 106' (pen.); Nando (yellow card); Voro (yellow card)	Report	107' Brattbakk; (yellow card) Hoftun; (yellow card) Kvarme; (yellow card) Rise; (yellow card) Skammelsrud	Stadium: Estadio Riazor; Referee: Alfred Wieser (Austria)

Deportivo La Coruña won 4–2 on aggregate

==== Second round ====
18 October 1994 First leg	Tirol Innsbruck (Austria)	2–0	(Spain) Deportivo La Coruña	Innsbruck, Austria
	Sané 30'; Stöger 56'; Kirchler (yellow card); Silberberger (yellow card)	Report	(yellow card) Barragán; (yellow card) Fran	Stadium: Tivoli; Referee: Graziano Cesari (Italy)

1 November 1994 Second leg	Deportivo La Coruña (Spain)	4–0	(Austria) Tirol Innsbruck	A Coruña, Spain
	Barragán 35', 38' (yellow card); Donato 39' (pen.); Manjarín 71'; Nando (yellow card)	Report	(red card) 55' Mählich; (yellow card) Baur; (yellow card) Cerny; (yellow card) Poiger	Stadium: Estadio Riazor; Referee: Dick Jol (Netherlands)

Deportivo La Coruña won 4–2 on aggregate

==== Third round ====
22 November 1994 First leg	Deportivo La Coruña (Spain)	1–0	(Germany) Borussia Dortmund	A Coruña, Spain
	Bebeto 23'; Manjarín (yellow card); Ribera (yellow card)	Report	(yellow card) Reuter; (yellow card) Zorc	Stadium: Estadio Riazor; Referee: Serge Muhmenthaler (Switzerland)

6 December 1994 Second leg	Borussia Dortmund (Germany)	3–1 (a.e.t.)	(Spain) Deportivo La Coruña	Dortmund, Germany
	Zorc 50'; Riedle 116'; Ricken 119'; Möller (yellow card)	Report	102' (yellow card) Alfredo Santaelena; (yellow card) Aldana; (yellow card) Barragán; (yellow card) Donato; (yellow card) Fran	Stadium: Westfalenstadion; Attendance: 35,400; Referee: Joël Quiniou (France)

Borussia Dortmund won 3–2 on aggregate

=== Copa del Rey ===
==== Eight-finals ====
8 February 1995 1	Lleida	0–3	Deportivo	Lleida
21:00 CET		Report (in Spanish)	Claudio 20'; Donato 54' (pen.); Bebeto 90'	Stadium: Camp d'Esports; Attendance: 10,000; Referee: Ansuátegui Roca (Valencian Community)

15 February 1995 2	Deportivo	4–1	Lleida	A Coruña
21:00 CET	Julio Salinas 13', 34', 63'; Đukić 73'	Report (in Spanish)	Pineda 28'	Stadium: Riazor; Attendance: — Referee: Brito Arceo (Canary Islands)

==== Quarter-finals ====
9 March 1995 1	Deportivo	3–0	Athletic Bilbao	A Coruña
21:30 CET	Bebeto 31'; Donato 62'; Manjarín 89'	Report (in Spanish)		Stadium: Riazor; Attendance: 15,000; Referee: Fernández Marín (Valencian Community)

21 March 1995 2	Athletic Bilbao	0–0	Deportivo	Bilbao
21:30 CET		Report (in Spanish)		Stadium: San Mamés; Attendance: — Referee: Antonio Jesús López Nieto (Andalusia)

==== Semifinals ====
30 May 1995 1	Sporting Gijon	0–2	Deportivo	Gijón
		Report	20' Manjarín; 54' Julio Salinas	Stadium: El Molinón; Referee: Fernández Marín

14 June 1995 2	Deportivo La Coruña	0–1 (2–1 agg.)	Sporting Gijon	A Coruña
		Report	10' Lediakhov	Stadium: Riazor; Referee: Gracia Redondo

==== Final ====
24 June 1995	Deportivo La Coruña	1–1 (suspended)	Valencia	Madrid
21:00 CEST	Manjarín 35'	Report	70' Mijatović	Stadium: Santiago Bernabéu; Attendance: 95,000; Referee: José María García-Aranda
Note: Match suspended at 79' due to heavy rain condition.

===== Rematch =====
27 June 1995	Deportivo La Coruña	2–1	Valencia	Madrid
20:30 CEST	35' Manjarín; 81' Alfredo		70' Mijatović	Stadium: Santiago Bernabéu; Attendance: 81,000; Referee: José María García-Aranda
Note: Match rescheduled from 24 June 1995, both teams disputed just the 11 minutes pending to play.

== Statistics ==
=== Players statistics ===
Last updated on 27 April 2021.

No.	Pos	Nat	Player	Total		La Liga		Copa del Rey		UEFA Cup	
No.	Pos	Nat	Player	Apps	Goals	Apps	Goals	Apps	Goals	Apps	Goals
	GK	(Spain) ESP	Francisco Liaño	34	0	26+1	0	5	0	2	0
	DF	(Spain) ESP	Nando	42	1	30+1	1	6	0	5	0
	DF	(Federal Republic of Yugoslavia) YUG	Miroslav Đukić	49	3	36	2	7	1	6	0
	DF	(Spain) ESP	Luis López Rekarte	42	0	31	0	6	0	5	0
	DF	(Spain) ESP	Voro	45	1	33	1	7	0	5	0
	DF	(Spain) ESP	José Luis Ribera	42	0	33	0	7	0	2	0
	MF	(Spain) ESP	Adolfo Aldana	44	6	26+7	6	5+1	0	4+1	0
	MF	(Brazil) BRA	Donato	49	12	36+1	8	6	2	6	2
	MF	(Spain) ESP	Fran	48	7	35+1	7	5+1	0	6	0
	MF	(Spain) ESP	Javier Manjarín	48	9	24+13	5	4+2	3	3+2	1
	FW	(Brazil) BRA	Bebeto	34	22	25+1	16	5	2	3	4
	GK	(Spain) ESP	Juan Canales	17	0	10+2	0	1	0	4	0
	FW	(Spain) ESP	Julio Salinas	32	16	18+6	12	3+1	4	4	0
	DF	(Spain) ESP	Francisco Villarroya	25	0	16+1	0	3+1	0	4	0
	MF	(Spain) ESP	José Ramón	28	3	9+14	3	2+2	0	1	0
	FW	(Spain) ESP	Claudio Barragán	24	6	6+9	3	2+2	1	2+3	2
	DF	(Spain) ESP	Paco Jémez	11	0	6	0	0	0	4+1	0
	MF	(Brazil) BRA	Mauro Silva	7	0	6	0	0+1	0	0	0
	MF	(Spain) ESP	Alfredo Santaelena	30	3	3+18	1	2+3	1	0+4	1
	GK	(Spain) ESP	Agustín Elduayen	4	0	2+1	0	1	0	0	0
	MF	(Spain) ESP	Emilio Viqueira	0	0	0	0	0	0	0	0
Players who have left the club after the start of the season:
	FW	(Bulgaria) BUL	Emil Kostadinov	9	2	7+2	2	0	0	0	0
	FW	(Spain) ESP	Pedro Riesco	0	0	0	0	0	0	0	0
