= 1993–94 Deportivo de La Coruña season =

Real Club Deportivo de La Coruña
1993–94 season
- President: Cesar Lendoiro
- Manager: Arsenio Iglesias
- Stadium: Riazor
- Primera División: 2º (in UEFA Cup)
- Copa del Rey: Eightfinals
- UEFA Cup: Eightfinals
- Top goalscorer: League: All: Bebeto (16)
Home colours	Away colours

In the 1993–94 season Real Club Deportivo de La Coruña competed in Primera División, Copa del Rey and UEFA Cup.

== Summary ==
During championship "Súper Depor" was a serious contender for the title along with FC Barcelona: on round 14 the team was +3 above blaugrana, remained at the top of the table even a defeat on round 26 against the same FC Barcelona, became the last negative result of the squad in the campaign. Deportivo closed the final rounds of the season with results included several draws in extremis. Then on the final round, the squad reached a draw 0:0 against Valencia CF with a penalty-kick missed by Miroslav Djukić at the end of the match: with a better head-to-head goal average, the Blaugrana surpassed Depor in classification, who finished the season as runners-up.

In 1993–94 Copa del Rey the squad lost 3-1 the first leg eliminated by Real Oviedo in Eightfinals. In UEFA Cup, Deportivo lost the first match 1–0 against Aalborg, won the series in the second leg 5–0. The club defeated Aston Villa in the Round of 32, in Eightfinals the team lost both legs with a score 1–0 against German side Eintracht Frankfurt, being eliminated of the tournament.

Goalkeeper Francisco Liaño repeated as winner of Zamora Trophy this time with an all-time record average of 0,47 as a result of only conceded 18 goals against in 38 matches. In addition to setting a record as the most clean sheet in one season, with 26 times.

== Squad ==
Note: Flags indicate national team as defined under FIFA eligibility rules; some limited exceptions apply. Players may hold more than one non-FIFA nationality.

No.	Pos.	Nation	Player
—	GK	ESP	Agustín de Carlos
—	GK	ESP	Juan Garrido
—	GK	ESP	Francisco Liaño
—	DF	YUG	Miroslav Đukić
—	DF	ESP	Mariano Hoyas
—	DF	ESP	Paco Jémez
—	DF	ESP	Nando
—	DF	ESP	López Rekarte
—	DF	ESP	José Luis Ribera
—	DF	ESP	Ricardo Jesús Serna
—	DF	ESP	Voro
—	MF	ESP	Adolfo Aldana
—	MF	ESP	Alfredo
—	MF	BRA	Donato

No.	Pos.	Nation	Player
—	MF	ESP	Fran
—	MF	ESP	José Ramón
—	MF	BRA	Mauro Silva
—	MF	ESP	Míchel
—	MF	ESP	Marcos Vales
—	MF	ESP	Emilio José Viqueira
—	FW	ESP	Claudio Barragán
—	FW	BRA	Bebeto
—	FW	ESP	Braulio
—	FW	ESP	Juanito
—	FW	BUL	Atanas Kirov
—	FW	ESP	Javier Manjarín
—	FW	ESP	Pedro Riesco

=== Transfers ===
In
Pos.	Name	from	Type
MF	Donato	Atlético Madrid	-
DF	Voro	Valencia CF	-
FW	Javier Manjarin	Sporting Gijón	-
MF	Alfredo Santaelena	Atlético Madrid	-
FW	Pedro Riesco	Rayo Vallecano	-
DF	Paco Jemez	Rayo Vallecano	-
GK	Agustin Elduayen	Real Burgos	-

Out
Pos.	Name	To	Type
MF	Ilian Kiriakov	Mérida	-
DF	Albistegui	Real Sociedad	-
FW	Antonio Doncel	Real Burgos	-
FW	Mujika	Alaves	-
FW	Joaquin Villa	Castellon	-
DF	Sabin Bilbao	Granada	-
FW	Ramón	Albacete Balompié	-
DF	Arturo	Las Palmas	-

== Competitions ==
=== La Liga ===
==== League table ====
Pos	Team	Pld	W	D	L	GF	GA	GD	Pts	Qualification or relegation
1	Barcelona (C)	38	25	6	7	91	42	+49	56 (Note: DEP 1–0 BAR; BAR 3–0 DEP)	Qualification for the Champions League group stage
2	Deportivo La Coruña	38	22	12	4	54	18	+36	56	Qualification for the UEFA Cup first round
3	Zaragoza	38	19	8	11	71	47	+24	46	Qualification for the Cup Winners' Cup first round (Note: Zaragoza entered UEFA Cup Winners' Cup as winners of 1993–94 Copa del Rey.)
4	Real Madrid	38	19	7	12	61	50	+11	45	Qualification for the UEFA Cup first round
5	Athletic Bilbao	38	16	11	11	61	47	+14	43	Qualification for the UEFA Cup first round

Source: LFP
Rules for classification: 1) points; 2) head-to-head points; 3) head-to-head goal difference; 4) head-to-head goals scored; 5) goal difference; 6) number of goals scored.
(C) Champions

==== Results by round ====
Round	1	2	3	4	5	6	7	8	9	10	11	12	13	14	15	16	17	18	19	20	21	22	23	24	25	26	27	28	29	30	31	32	33	34	35	36	37	38
Ground	H	A	H	A	H	A	H	A	H	A	A	H	A	H	A	H	A	H	A	A	H	A	H	A	H	A	H	A	H	H	A	H	A	H	A	H	A	H
Result	D	W	W	D	L	D	W	W	W	D	L	W	W	W	W	W	D	W	W	D	W	L	W	W	W	L	D	D	D	W	W	W	W	W	D	D	W	D
Position	10	5	1	4	8	6	4	5	3	3	5	2	2	1	1	1	1	1	1	1	1	1	1	1	1	1	1	1	1	1	1	1	1	1	1	1	1	2

Source: https://www.bdfutbol.com/en/t/t1992-9339.html?tab=partits
A = Away; H = Home; W = Win; D = Draw; L = Loss; = Leader, 1994–95 UEFA Champions League Group stage; = 1994–95 UEFA Cup First round; = 1993–94 Relegation playoff to 1994–95 Segunda Division; = 1994–95 Segunda Division; R = 1994–95 UEFA Cup Winners' Cup

==== Matches ====
5 September 1993 1	Deportivo La Coruña	0-0	Celta de Vigo	A Coruña
	Ribera (yellow card) 43' (yellow-red card); Nando (yellow card)	Report	Berges (yellow card); Engonga (yellow card); Ratkovic (yellow card)	Stadium: Riazor; Referee: Ansuategui Roca

11 September 1993 2	Sporting de Gijón	0-2	Deportivo La Coruña	Gijón
	Abelardo (yellow card); Avelino (yellow card); Escaich (yellow card)	Report	Nando 79'; Manjarín 82' (yellow card); Fran (yellow card); Mauro Silva (yellow card); Claudio (yellow card)	Stadium: Estadio El Molinón; Referee: García Aranda

18 September 1993 3	Deportivo La Coruña	4-0	Real Madrid	A Coruña
	Claudio 32'; Claudio 57'; Manjarín 83'; Fran 89'; Nando (yellow card); Donato (yellow card)	Report	Hierro (yellow card); Alkorta (yellow card); Martín Vázquez (yellow card); Milla (yellow card); Luis Enrique (yellow card)	Stadium: Riazor; Referee: Diaz Vega

25 September 1993 4	Sevilla CF	0-0	Deportivo La Coruña	Sevilla
	Unzúe (red card) 57'; Ferreira (yellow card); Simeone (yellow card); Monchu (yellow card)	Report	Djukic (yellow card); Ribera (yellow card); Nando (yellow card); Donato (yellow card)	Stadium: Estadio Sanchez Pizjuan; Referee: Valdivieso

3 October 1993 5	Deportivo La Coruña	0-1	Real Sociedad	A Coruña
	Voro (yellow card)	Report	Alkiza 58'; Larrañaga (yellow card); Alaba (yellow card); Fuentes (yellow card)	Stadium: Riazor; Referee: Navarrete

6 October 1993 6	Albacete Balompié	0-0	Deportivo La Coruña	Albacete
	Alejandro (yellow card)		Lopez Rekarte (yellow card); Ribera (yellow card); Voro (yellow card); Fran (yellow card); Claudio (yellow card)	Stadium: Carlos Belmonte; Referee: Nuñez Manrique

16 October 1993 7	Deportivo La Coruña	1-0	FC Barcelona	A Coruña
	Bebeto 52'; Hoyas (yellow card)	Report	Goikoetxea (yellow card)	Stadium: Riazor; Referee: Urio Velazquez

24 October 1993 8	Real Zaragoza	0-1	Deportivo La Coruña	Zaragoza
	Poyet (yellow card); Aragon (yellow card); Nayim (yellow card)	Report	Solana 67' (own goal); Bebeto (yellow card)	Stadium: La Romareda; Referee: Santamaría Uzqueda

30 October 1993 9	Deportivo La Coruña	3-1	Osasuna	A Coruña
	Bebeto 44'; Fran 56' (yellow card); Donato 87'	Report	Martín Domínguez 61'; Edu Martinez (yellow card)	Stadium: Riazor; Referee: Merino Gonzalez

7 November 1993 10	Real Valladolid	0-0	Deportivo La Coruña	Valladolid
	Ferreras (yellow card); Damián (yellow card)	Report	Djukic (yellow card); Voro (yellow card); Donato (yellow card)	Stadium: Estadio José Zorrilla; Referee: Gracia Redondo

10 November 1993 11	Athletic Bilbao	3-1	Deportivo La Coruña	Bilbao
	Julen Guerrero 34' (yellow card); Eskurza 64'; Valverde 89' (yellow card); Valencia (yellow card); Garitano (yellow card)	Report	Donato 30' (pen.); Ribera (yellow card); Manjarín (yellow card); Pedro Riesco (yellow card)	Stadium: San Mamés; Referee: Lopez Nieto

20 November 1993 12	Deportivo La Coruña	4-0	Real Oviedo	A Coruña
	Fran 2'; Donato 9' (pen.); Bebeto 23'; Fran 37'; Bebeto (penalty missed) 45'; Djukic (yellow card)	Report	Cristobal (yellow card); Jerkan (yellow card)	Stadium: Riazor; Referee: Fernandez Marin

27 November 1993 13	Atlético Madrid	0-1	Deportivo La Coruña	Madrid
	Tomas (yellow card); Caminero (yellow card); Manolo (yellow card); Kosecki 69	Report	Djukic 64'; Nando (yellow card)	Stadium: Estadio Vicente Calderón; Referee: Ansuategui Roca

4 December 1993 14	Deportivo La Coruña	1-0	Racing Santander	A Coruña
	Bebeto 89'	Report	Pablo Alfaro (yellow card) 89' (yellow-red card); Geli (yellow card)	Stadium: Riazor; Referee: Rubio Valdivieso

12 December 1993 15	CD Tenerife	0-1	Deportivo La Coruña	Santa Cruz de Tenerife
	Redondo (yellow card)	Report	Alfredo 66'; Lopez Rekarte (yellow card); Mauro Silva (yellow card) 60' (yellow-red card)	Stadium: Estadio Heliodoro Rodriguez; Referee: Marin Lopez

19 December 1993 16	Deportivo La Coruña	2-0	UE Lleida	A Coruña
	Donato 11' (pen.); Bebeto 71'	Report	Herrera (yellow card); Aguila (yellow card)	Stadium: Riazor; Referee: Perez Sanchez

1 January 1994 17	Rayo Vallecano	0-0	Deportivo La Coruña	Madrid
	Ayarza (yellow card); Alex (yellow card); Calderon (yellow card); Visnjic (yellow card); Hugo Sánchez (yellow card)	Report	Voro (yellow card); Nando (yellow card)	Stadium: Vallecas; Referee: Martin Navarrete

9 January 1994 18	Deportivo La Coruña	3-0	Logroñes	A Coruña
	Claudio 41'; Claudio 43'; Donato 46'; Mauro Silva (yellow card); Manjarin (yellow card)	Report	Martin (red card) 77'	Stadium: Riazor; Referee: Pajares Paz

15 January 1994 19	Valencia CF	1-3	Deportivo La Coruña	Valencia
	Gálvez 51'; Camarasa (red card) 60'; Fernando (yellow card)	Report	Mauro Silva 53'; Bebeto 75'; Claudio 86'; Donato (yellow card)	Stadium: Estadio Mestalla; Referee: Andújar Oliver

23 January 1994 20	Celta de Vigo	0-0	Deportivo La Coruña	Vigo
	Otero (yellow card); Patxi Salinas (yellow card); Berges (yellow card); Limperger 15'	Report	Nando (yellow card); Fran (yellow card)	Stadium: Estadio Balaídos; Referee: Gracia Redondo

30 January 1994 21	Deportivo La Coruña	2-1	Sporting Gijón	A Coruña
	Donato 42' (pen.); Bebeto 87'	Report	Juanele 89' (pen.)	Stadium: Riazor; Referee: Rubio Valdivieso

5 February 1994 22	Real Madrid	2-0	Deportivo La Coruña	Madrid
	Morales 56'; Míchel 71'; Chendo (yellow card); Sanchis (yellow card)	Report	Hoyas (yellow card); Djukic (yellow card)	Stadium: Estadio Santiago Bernabéu

12 January 1994 23	Deportivo La Coruña	2-0	Sevilla CF	A Coruña
	Bebeto 44'; Fran 46'; Djukic (yellow card)	Report	Šuker (penalty missed) 45' (yellow card); Prieto (yellow card); Simeone (yellow card)	Stadium: Riazor; Referee: Santamaría Uzqueda

20 February 1994 24	Real Sociedad	0-1	Deportivo La Coruña	San Sebastián
	Oceano (yellow card) 85' (yellow-red card)	Report	Ribera 72'; Lopez Rekarte (yellow card); Nando (yellow card); Alfredo (yellow card)	Stadium: Estadio Anoeta; Referee: Marin Lopez

23 February 1994 25	Deportivo La Coruña	5-1	Albacete Balompié	A Coruña
	Bebeto 16'; Bebeto 29'; López Rekarte 58'; Claudio 63'; Bebeto 73'	Report	Zalazar 54'; Geli (yellow card) 72' (yellow-red card)	Stadium: Riazor; Referee: Ansuategui Roca

26 February 1994 26	FC Barcelona	3-0	Deportivo La Coruña	Barcelona
	Stoichkov 26'; Romário 30'; Laudrup 78'; Bakero (yellow card); Amor (yellow card)	Report	Nando (yellow card); Claudio (yellow card)	Stadium: Camp Nou; Referee: Diaz Vega

6 March 1994 27	Deportivo La Coruña	1-1	Real Zaragoza	A Coruña
	Bebeto 44'; Lopez Rekarte (yellow card); Djukic (yellow card); Alfredo (yellow card)	Report	Poyet 46' (yellow card); Higuera (yellow card); Esnáider (yellow card); Nayim (yellow card)	Stadium: Riazor; Referee: Fernandez Marin

13 March 1994 28	Osasuna	0-0	Deportivo La Coruña	Pamplona
	Larrainzar (yellow card); Gonzalez (yellow card); Luke (yellow card); Arozarena (yellow card)	Report	Ribera (yellow card); Donato (penalty missed) 45'	Stadium: Estadio El Sadar; Referee: Merino Gonzalez

20 March 1994 29	Deportivo La Coruña	0-0	Real Valladolid	A Coruña
	Mauro Silva (yellow card)	Report	Ivan Rocha (red card) 89'; Ramon (yellow card); Cuaresma (yellow card); Correa (yellow card)	Stadium: Riazor; Referee: Gracia Redondo

27 March 1994 30	Deportivo La Coruña	4-1	Athletic Bilbao	A Coruña
	Bebeto 7'; Donato 17'; Bebeto 51'; Pedro Riesco 70'	Report	Ziganda 48'	Stadium: Riazor; Referee: Rubio Valdivieso

3 April 1994 31	Real Oviedo	2-5	Deportivo La Coruña	Oviedo
	Carlos 12'; Janković 55'	Report	Nando 27'; Bebeto 45'; Nando 47'; Bebeto 74'; Claudio 83'	Stadium: Carlos Tartiere; Referee: Lopez Nieto

7 April 1994 32	Deportivo La Coruña	2-1	Atlético Madrid	A Coruña
	Donato 43'; Nando 74'	Report	Kosecki 59'	Stadium: Riazor; Referee: Urio Velazquez

10 April 1994 33	Racing Santander	0-1	Deportivo La Coruña	Santander
		Report	Donato 54' (pen.)	Stadium: Estadio El Sardinero; Referee: Perez Sanchez

17 April 1994 34	Deportivo La Coruña	2-0	CD Tenerife	A Coruña
	Claudio 68'; Claudio 73'	Report		Stadium: Riazor; Referee: Diaz Vega

23 April 1994 35	UE Lleida	0-0	Deportivo La Coruña	Lleida
		Report		Stadium: Camp d'Esports; Referee: Fernande Marin

30 April 1994 36	Deportivo La Coruña	0-0	Rayo Vallecano	A Coruña
		Report		Stadium: Riazor; Referee: Gracia Redondo

8 May 1994 37	Logroñés	0-2	Deportivo La Coruña	Logroño
		Report	Donato 57'; Manjarín 68'	Stadium: Las Gaunas; Referee: Garcia Aranda

14 May 1994 38	Deportivo La Coruña	0-0	Valencia CF	A Coruña
	Djukic (penalty missed) 89'; Voro (yellow card); Donato (yellow card)	Report	Mendieta (yellow card); Cervera (yellow card) 87' (yellow-red card)	Stadium: Riazor

== Statistics ==
=== Players statistics ===
No.	Pos	Nat	Player	Total		1993–94 La Liga		1993–94 Copa del Rey		1993–94 UEFA Cup	
No.	Pos	Nat	Player	Apps	Goals	Apps	Goals	Apps	Goals	Apps	Goals
	GK	(Spain) ESP	Francisco Liaño	38	-18	38	-18				
	DF	(Spain) ESP	López Rekarte	30	1	30	1				
	DF	(Federal Republic of Yugoslavia) YUG	Miroslav Đukić	36	1	35+1	1				
	DF	(Spain) ESP	Voro	36	0	34+2	0				
	DF	(Spain) ESP	José Luis Ribera	33	1	33	1				
	DF	(Spain) ESP	Nando	36	4	36	4				
	MF	(Brazil) BRA	Donato	36	10	34+2	10				
	MF	(Spain) ESP	Fran	37	5	37	5				
	MF	(Brazil) BRA	Mauro Silva	35	1	35	1				
	FW	(Spain) ESP	Claudio Barragán	31	9	27+4	9				
	FW	(Brazil) BRA	Bebeto	34	16	34	16				
	GK	(Spain) ESP	Agustín Elduayen	0	0	0	0				
	FW	(Spain) ESP	Javier Manjarín	27	3	16+11	3				
	MF	(Spain) ESP	Alfredo	26	1	12+14	1				
	DF	(Spain) ESP	Mariano Hoyas	10	0	8+2	0				
	FW	(Spain) ESP	Pedro Riesco	18	1	4+14	1				
	DF	(Spain) ESP	Paco Jémez	4	0	4	0				
	MF	(Spain) ESP	José Ramón	7	0	1+6	0				
	MF	(Spain) ESP	Marcos Vales	11	0	0+11	0				
	GK	(Spain) ESP	Juan Garrido								
	DF	(Spain) ESP	Ricardo Jesús Serna								
	MF	(Spain) ESP	Adolfo Aldana								
	MF	(Spain) ESP	Míchel								
	MF	(Spain) ESP	Emilio José Viqueira								
	FW	(Spain) ESP	Braulio								
	FW	(Spain) ESP	Juanito								
	FW	(Bulgaria) BUL	Atanas Kirov								

- Source: https://www.bdfutbol.com/en/t/t1993-9413.html
