= Pedro Riesco =

Spanish former professional footballer

Personal information
- Full name: Pedro Riesco Herrera
- Date of birth: 25 October 1969 (age 57)
- Place of birth: Madrid, Spain
- Height: 1.70 m (5 ft 7 in)
- Position: Forward

Senior career*
Years	Team	Apps	(Gls)
1989–1990	Getafe	11	(3)
1990–1993	Rayo Vallecano	85	(14)
1993–1996	Deportivo La Coruña	18	(1)
1995	→ Real Valladolid (loan)	15	(1)
1995–1996	→ Albacete Balompié (loan)	25	(4)
1996–1998	Deportivo Alavés	64	(5)
1998–1999	Ourense	18	(4)
1999–2003	Terrassa	77	(12)
Total		313	(44)
- * Club domestic league appearances and goals

Pedro Riesco Herrera (born 25 October 1969) is a Spanish former professional footballer who played as a forward. After retirement, he worked as a youth coach and an agent, as well as having success in amateur seven-a-side football.

He amassed La Liga totals of 93 games and 12 goals during four seasons with Rayo Vallecano, Deportivo La Coruña, Real Valladolid and Albacete Balompié. He also played in the second and third tiers of Spanish football in the course of a 14-year professional career.

== Playing career ==
=== Getafe ===
Riesco was born in the Spanish capital, Madrid, and began his professional career with Madrilenian side Getafe. He made his way into the team in the latter stages of the 1989–90 Segunda División B campaign, making his debut in a 2–2 draw at home to Juventud Cambados on 11 March. He scored his first goal on 29 April, netting after just four minutes away to Cultural Leonesa at Estadio Antonio Amilivia, in a match which Getafe ultimately won 2–1. He followed this up with a second goal a week later in a 3–1 home win over Real Ávila, and added a third before the end of the season, in the 2–1 home win over Arosa on 20 May. A week later, he played in a 2–1 away defeat at the hands of Pontevedra at Estadio Municipal de Pasarón, which marked his 11th appearance of the season.

Despite this defeat in the final match, Getafe ended the season as runners-up. Riesco's good form was attracting attention, and he moved on at the end of the season.

=== Rayo Vallecano ===
Staying in Madrid, Riesco joined newly relegated Segunda División side Rayo Vallecano in 1990. He made his debut on 9 September at home to Deportivo La Coruña, coming on as a 68th-minute substitute for Rafael García Cortés. Rayo ultimately lost the match at Vallecas 3–0. His full debut came a week later in a 1–1 away draw against Real Avilés Industrial, and he kept his place for the home fixture against Figueres on 23 September, which ended in the same scoreline.

He made 14 appearances that season, but it was in 1991–92 that he would really make his name. He played 39 times in all competitions, and his eight goals were a major factor in Rayo securing the runners-up spot in the league and earning a return to La Liga after two seasons away. He made his top flight debut on 5 September 1992, against Valencia at Mestalla Stadium, in a match which Rayo lost 1–0. Their first home game was eight days later against Logroñés, which ended 2–1 in the hosts' favour. On 1 October, Riesco scored a brace in the 4–1 Copa del Rey third round first leg victory over Tudelano at Estadio Ciudad de Tudela; Rayo went on to win the tie 10–2.

Riesco opened his league account on 8 November with a goal just after half time against Sevilla at Ramón Sánchez Pizjuán Stadium, although he couldn't prevent the hosts taking a 3–2 victory. Ultimately, that season was his best in the top flight, as he scored eight goals in 39 appearances in all competitions. Unsurprisingly, this form led to interest from bigger clubs, including Real Madrid and Atlético Madrid, and by the end of the season it was known that he was moving on. His final match for Rayo was a 2–2 home draw with Albacete Balompié on 13 June 1993.

=== Deportivo La Coruña ===
Despite interest from Madrid's two giant teams, it was confirmed in May 1993 that Riesco would join Deportivo La Coruña, with a fee of 100 million Pta and a three-year contract. Head coach Arsenio Iglesias was in the process of building his legendary Super Depor side, which featured the attacking talents of Brazil international Bebeto alongside Claudio Barragán and Javier Manjarín, both of whom would earn call-ups to the Spain national team thanks to their exploits with the club. Despite this competition, Riesco started the first game of the season on 5 September, a 0–0 home draw with Celta Vigo at Estadio Riazor, although his opportunities in the league would be limited.

On 28 September, Riesco made his European debut in the home second leg of the UEFA Cup first round tie against Aalborg BK of Denmark. He came on as a substitute for Bebeto, who had already scored a hat trick, with 13 minutes to play, and Depor ultimately won 5–0 to overturn a 1–0 deficit from the first leg and progress to the second round. Their opponents there were England's Aston Villa, and again Riesco started on the bench for the home first leg. Again, he was brought on with 13 minutes left, this time for Manjarín, with the scores at 0–0. Two minutes later, Dean Saunders gave Villa the lead, but Riesco scored his first Deportivo goal 3 minutes from time to ensure the match ended as a draw. The second leg at Villa Park, in which Riesco also made a late substitute appearance in place of Manjarín, ended 1–0 to the visitors and saw Depor progress once more.

Riesco scored again on 12 January, netting the only goal of the Copa del Rey round of 16 second leg against Real Oviedo at Estadio Carlos Tartiere, although as the first leg had ended 3–1 to Oviedo, Depor were still eliminated. He finally opened his league account on 27 March, scoring just seconds after being introduced in place of Bebeto with 20 minutes to play at home to Athletic Bilbao, a match which ended 4–1 to the hosts. He ended the season with three goals in 25 appearances, although 18 of those were from the bench, helping the club to the runners-up spot in the league.

Before the start of the 1994–95 season, Deportivo signed Spanish international forward Julio Salinas from Barcelona, pushing Riesco further down the pecking order. A prospective move to Racing Santander fell through due to Depor insisting on a prohibitively high price. By November, it had been announced that Bulgarian Emil Kostadinov would also join from Porto in January, and Riesco told the Mundo Deportivo newspaper of his desire to leave the club. Among others, Santander (again), Real Betis, Español and Albacete Balompié were all reported to be interested in signing him.

He sat on the bench for the second leg of Depor's UEFA Cup third round tie against Borussia Dortmund of Germany at Westfalenstadion on 6 December, but didn't play a single minute in that or any other competition. During the Christmas break, another move, this time to Compostela on loan, fell through at the last minute in bizarre fashion. Compostela president José María Caneda had already announced the signing, and Riesco cut short his Christmas holiday to travel from his home in Madrid to formalise the deal. However, just hours before he was due to be presented to the press, Riesco was told they had changed their minds, and didn't want him after all. It was later explained that the fee demanded by Deportivo was once again the issue.

At the third time of asking, a deal was finally agreed, and Riesco joined Real Valladolid on loan during the January transfer window. He made his Valladolid debut away to Logroñés on 8 January 1995, coming on for Mami Quevedo with 19 minutes to play in the 0–0 draw at Estadio Las Gaunas.

His home debut followed two days later in the second leg of Valladolid's Copa del Rey third round tie against Extremadura at Estadio José Zorrilla. He marked the occasion with a goal, which helped his team to a 2–1 victory and progress to the next round. His first league start came in the 2–0 home win over Sporting de Gijón on 29 January, and three days later he scored in another cup match at home to Toledo which ended in the same scoreline, although Valladolid were eliminated 3–2 on aggregate. He scored his only league goal for Valladolid came in a 2–0 home win over his potential employers, Compostela, on 19 February, and he ended the season with three goals in his 18 appearances.

Riesco returned to his parent club ahead of the 1995–96 season, and did make one final appearance for Depor. This came on 14 September, when he came on in place of Manjarín for the last seven minutes of their UEFA Cup Winners' Cup first round first leg match against APOEL of Cyprus at Makario Stadium, which ended 0–0. Riesco was not involved as Deportivo won a stunning return leg 8–0.

With opportunities still severely limited at Deportivo, Riesco went out on loan again in October, this time to Albacete Balompié until the end of the season. He had to wait until 17 December to make his Albacete debut, which came in a 3–1 away win over Tenerife at Estadio Heliodoro Rodríguez López. From then on, though, he was a fixture in the team, and made his home debut a week later in a 2–0 win over Athletic Bilbao at Estadio Carlos Belmonte. He netted his first goal for the club in a 2–0 home win over Mérida on 25 February, and ended the season with four goals from his 27 matches. At the end of the season, Albacete found themselves in a relegation playoff against CF Extremadura, and Riesco played in both legs as they lost 2–0 on aggregate and were relegated.

=== Deportivo Alavés ===
After only 26 matches in three seasons, Riesco finally left Deportivo for good in the summer of 1996, signing for Deportivo Alavés in the Segunda División. He made his Alavés debut in a 1–0 Copa del Rey first round win over Cultural Leonesa at Estadio Antonio Amilivia on 4 September, and also featured in the second leg at Mendizorrotza Stadium two weeks later, which Alavés won 2–0. His league debut came against Real Mallorca on 22 September, coming off the bench for Bruno Alicarte after 66 minutes of the 3–1 defeat at Lluís Sitjar Stadium.

Riesco had to wait until 20 October to make his first start in the league, in the 1–0 loss to Eibar at Ipurua Municipal Stadium. Six days later, he started in front of Alavés's home supporters in the league for the first time, as they beat Lleida 3–1. He finally netted his first goal for the club in a 4–0 home win over Écija Balompié on 22 December, and ended the season with four goals in 34 appearances. 1997–98 was to be even more successful for both club and player: Riesco played 45 times, and contributed three goals, while Alavés enjoyed one of the most successful seasons in their history, winning the Segunda División title and earning a return to the top flight for the first time since 1955–56. They also enjoyed an excellent run in the Copa del Rey, reaching the semi-finals for the first time in their history.

This cup run included a famous victory over Real Madrid in the round of 16. Going into the second leg at Santiago Bernabéu Stadium on 21 January, Alavés held a slim 1–0 advantage thanks to Manuel Serrano's goal in the first leg. With just ten minutes gone in the second leg, Riesco doubled their advantage, which would prove to be crucial. Despite Real goals from Roberto Carlos and Davor Šuker, Riesco's goal sent Alavés through the quarter-finals thanks to the away goals rule.

Alavés went on to beat Riesco's former club, Deportivo La Coruña, in the quarter-finals, before finally being eliminated by Real Mallorca in the semi-finals. Despite this success, and Riesco's key part in it, his contract was not renewed at the end of the season. His final match for Alavés was a 3–0 home win over Toledo on 16 May, in which he played the last 15 minutes after coming on for Sívori.

=== Ourense ===
With his former club heading for La Liga, Riesco remained in the Segunda División by joining their erstwhile rivals Ourense in July 1998. He made his debut in the first match of the season, coming on as a substitute for Víctor Arias in the 3–0 away defeat by Sevilla at Ramón Sánchez Pizjuán Stadium on 30 August. From then on, he was a fixture in the starting line-up, making his home debut six days later in a 1–0 defeat at the hands of Málaga.

In the next league match on 13 September, at home to Recreativo de Huelva, he scored his first goal for Ourense from the penalty spot, which proved to be the only goal of the game. He ultimately scored four goals in 21 games, but once again did not have his contract renewed by the club at the end of the season. His final Ourense game for the club came on 30 May, playing for the last half hour of the 1–0 home win over Logroñés after coming on in place of Gaúcho. This victory wasn't enough to prevent Ourense's relegation, as they ended the season bottom of the table, a massive 20 points from safety.

=== Terrassa ===
Like Ourense, Riesco descended to Segunda División B in 1999–2000, joining Terrassa. He made his debut in the first match of the season, a 0–0 away draw with Cartagonova at their eponymous stadium on 29 August. Eight days later, he marked his home debut with a goal in the 3–0 victory over Lorca at Estadi Olímpic de Terrassa. This was one of three goals he scored in his 27 appearances during his first season with Terrassa.

The following season was his most prolific with the club, scoring six goals in 30 games. 2001–02 was to bring more success, as he scored three times in 21 appearances and helped Terrassa to a place in the promotion playoffs. He featured in five of the six playoff matches, against Barakaldo, Ceuta and Hércules, as Terrassa won all six and secured promotion to the Segunda División for the first time since 1978–79.

Riesco was now approaching his 33rd birthday, and struggled with injuries during the ensuing second tier campaign. He played just six times that year, just twice in the starting line-up. His final appearance was a one-minute cameo on 23 February 2003, being brought on in place of Juan Carlos Sanz at the end of a 2–1 win over Salamanca at Helmántico Stadium. Riesco retired at the end of the season after over 350 professional appearances in a 14-year career.

== Retirement ==
After his retirement, Riesco quickly moved into coaching, becoming the head of Terrassa's grassroots operation. He left the position in October 2004, being replaced by Carles Guardia. Later, he became an agent, working with, among others, Óscar Rico. He negotiated Rico's signing by Riesco's former club, Deportivo Alavés, in 2009. Like many other former players, including Dani García, Toni Muñoz, Óscar Mena and Kiko, Riesco has also enjoyed success in amateur seven-a-side football. He won the national "Soccer 7" championship with his team, Desperdicios Majadahonda.

== Honours ==
Getafe

- Segunda División B runners-up: 1989–90

Rayo Vallecano

- Segunda División runners-up: 1991–92 (earning promotion to La Liga)

Deportivo La Coruña

- Copa del Rey: 1994–95
- Supercopa de España: 1995
- La Liga runners-up: 1993–94, 1994–95
- Teresa Herrera Trophy: 1995
- Teresa Herrera Trophy runners-up: 1994

Deportivo Alavés

- Segunda División: 1997–98

Terrassa

- Segunda División B fifth place: 2001–02 (earning promotion to Segunda División)
- Copa Catalunya: 2001–02, 2002–03

== Career statistics ==
As of 20 January 2021

Club	Season	League			Cup		Europe		Other		Total	
Club	Season	Division	Apps	Goals	Apps	Goals	Apps	Goals	Apps	Goals	Apps	Goals
Getafe	1989–90	Segunda División B	11	3	–	–	–	–	–	–	11	3
Rayo Vallecano	1990–91	Segunda División	14	0	0	0	–	–	–	–	14	0
Rayo Vallecano	1991–92	Segunda División	36	8	3	0	–	–	–	–	39	8
Rayo Vallecano	1992–93	La Liga	35	6	4	2	–	–	–	–	39	8
Rayo Vallecano	Total		85	14	7	2	0	0	0	0	92	16
Deportivo La Coruña	1993–94	La Liga	18	1	2	1	5	1	–	–	25	3
Deportivo La Coruña	1994–95	La Liga	0	0	0	0	0	0	–	–	0	0
Deportivo La Coruña	1995–96	La Liga	0	0	0	0	1	0	–	–	1	0
Deportivo La Coruña	Total		18	1	2	1	6	1	0	0	26	3
Real Valladolid	1994–95	La Liga	15	1	3	2	–	–	–	–	18	3
Albacete Balompié	1995–96	La Liga	25	4	0	0	–	–	2	0	27	4
Deportivo Alavés	1996–97	Segunda División	30	4	4	0	–	–	–	–	34	4
Deportivo Alavés	1997–98	Segunda División	34	1	11	2	–	–	–	–	45	3
Deportivo Alavés	Total		64	5	15	2	0	0	0	0	79	7
Ourense	1998–99	Segunda División	18	4	3	0	–	–	–	–	21	4
Terrassa	1999–2000	Segunda División B	27	3	–	–	–	–	–	–	27	3
Terrassa	2000–01	Segunda División B	30	6	–	–	–	–	–	–	30	6
Terrassa	2001–02	Segunda División B	16	3	–	–	–	–	5	0	21	3
Terrassa	2002–03	Segunda División	4	0	2	0	–	–	–	–	6	0
Terrassa	Total		77	12	2	0	0	0	5	0	84	12
Career total			313	44	32	7	6	1	7	0	358	52

1. Appearances in the 1993–94 UEFA Cup
2. Appearance in the 1995–96 UEFA Cup Winners' Cup
3. Appearances in the 1995–96 La Liga relegation playoff
4. Appearances in the 2002 Segunda División B playoffs
