= Nando (footballer, born May 1967) =

Spanish footballer

Personal information
- Full name: Fernando Martínez Perales
- Date of birth: 21 May 1967 (age 59)
- Place of birth: Valencia, Spain
- Height: 1.72 m (5 ft 8 in)
- Position: Left-back

Senior career*
Years	Team	Apps	(Gls)
1984–1986	Levante	52	(4)
1986–1987	Valencia B		
1987–1992	Valencia	140	(7)
1992–1997	Deportivo La Coruña	173	(8)
1998–2000	Sevilla	68	(0)
2000–2001	Compostela	32	(1)
2001–2003	Atlético Arteixo	60	(0)
Total		525	(20)

International career
1988	Spain U21	2	(0)
1988–1993	Spain	2	(0)

Managerial career
- 2009–2011: Somozas
- 2011–2012: Cerceda
- 2013: Pontevedra
- 2015–2016: Banants (assistant)
- 2019: Laracha
- 2023: Socuéllamos
- * Club domestic league appearances and goals

Fernando Martínez Perales (born 21 May 1967), commonly known as Nando, is a Spanish former professional footballer who played as a left-back. He was also a manager.

In his career, the majority of which was spent at Valencia and Deportivo, he totalled 413 games across the two top tiers of Spanish football over 14 seasons. Of those, 343 were in La Liga (15 goals).

== Club career ==
Born in Valencia, Nando began his career with local club Levante UD, but moved across town to La Liga's Valencia CF after securing promotion from Tercera División in 1987. An attacking-minded full-back who started out as a midfielder, he spent five seasons at the latter, but started less frequently in his final two years following the arrival of Brazilian Leonardo.

Nando joined Deportivo de La Coruña on a free transfer in the summer of 1992, which also saw Adolfo Aldana, Bebeto and Mauro Silva arrive at the Estadio Riazor. During his spell, the Galician side began rising to Super Depor fame, winning their first two trophies – the Copa del Rey and the Supercopa de España, both in 1995 – which were the player's only honours.

Following the arrival of John Toshack as Deportivo manager in 1995, Nando once again found himself increasingly on the sidelines. Although he regained first-choice status for the 1996–97 season he lost his place to Frenchman Jérôme Bonnissel in the next, and signed with Segunda División team Sevilla FC in January 1998 after five and a half years and 202 competitive appearances.

Nando helped the Andalusians to promote to the top flight in his first full season, but suffered immediate relegation in a campaign in which he played 30 league matches, and met the same fate the following year with second-tier SD Compostela, after which he retired from professional football aged 34, going on to compete at amateur level with Atlético Arteixo.

== International career ==
Nando made his debut for Spain on 14 September 1988 in a 2–1 friendly loss to Yugoslavia, in Oviedo. His second and final appearance was a 1–1 draw against Mexico four years later, another exhibition game held in Las Palmas.

== Honours ==
Deportivo

- Copa del Rey: 1994–95
- Supercopa de España: 1995
