= 1995 Supercopa de España =

Deportivo La Coruña	Real Madrid
5	1
- on aggregate

First leg
Deportivo La Coruña	Real Madrid
3	0
- Date: 24 August 1995
- Venue: Riazor, A Coruña
- Referee: Juan Ansuátegui Roca
- Attendance: 25,000

Second leg
Real Madrid	Deportivo La Coruña
1	2
- Date: 27 August 1995
- Venue: Santiago Bernabéu, Madrid
- Referee: Antonio López Nieto
- Attendance: 25,000

The 1995 Supercopa de España was a two-legged Spanish football match played on 24 August and 27 August 1995. It was contested by Deportivo La Coruña, who were Spanish Cup winners in 1994–95, and Real Madrid, who won the 1994–95 Spanish League. Deportivo won 5–1 on aggregate.

== Match details ==
=== First leg ===
24 August 1995
22:00 CET

Deportivo La Coruña	3–0	Real Madrid
Donato 55' (pen.); Fran 60'; Bebeto 65'

Riazor, A Coruña
Attendance: 25,000
Referee: Ansuátegui Roca

Deportivo	Real Madrid

GK	13	(Spain) Juan Canales
RB	2	(Spain) Voro	(yellow card) 71'
CB	4	(Spain) José Luis Ribera
CB	5	(Federal Republic of Yugoslavia) Miroslav Đukić
LB	7	(Spain) Nando	(yellow card) 35'
CM	12	(Spain) Donato
CM	8	(Spain) Alfredo
RW	16	(Spain) Javier Manjarín		(substituted off) 64'
AM	10	(Spain) Fran (c)		(substituted off) 67'
LW	14	(Spain) Txiki Begiristain		(substituted off) 46'
CF	11	(Brazil) Bebeto
Substitutes:
DF	3	(Spain) Luis López Rekarte		(substituted on) 46'
FW	9	(Russia) Dmitri Radchenko		(substituted on) 64'
MF	19	(Spain) Adolfo Aldana		(substituted on) 67'
Manager:
(Wales) John Toshack

GK	1	(Spain) Francisco Buyo	(red card) 54'
RB	2	(Spain) Quique Sánchez Flores
CB	4	(Spain) Fernando Hierro
CB	5	(Spain) Manolo Sanchís (c)
LB	3	(Spain) Mikel Lasa	(yellow card) 48' (yellow-red card) 84'
DM	6	(Argentina) Fernando Redondo
RM	8	(Spain) Luis Enrique
LM	11	(Spain) José Amavisca		(substituted off) 75'
AM	10	(Colombia) Freddy Rincón		(substituted off) 54'
CF	7	(Spain) Raúl
CF	9	(Chile) Iván Zamorano
Substitutes:
GK	13	(Spain) Santiago Cañizares		(substituted on) 54'
MF	15	(Spain) Míchel		(substituted on) 75'
Manager:
(Argentina) Jorge Valdano

=== Second leg ===
27 August 1995
22:00 CET

Real Madrid	1–2	Deportivo La Coruña
Hierro 30'		Manjarín 81'; Begiristain 87'

Santiago Bernabéu, Madrid
Attendance: 25,000
Referee: López Nieto

Real Madrid	Deportivo

GK	1	(Spain) Santiago Cañizares
RB	2	(Spain) Quique Sánchez Flores
CB	4	(Spain) Fernando Hierro (c)
CB	6	(Spain) Rafael Alkorta	(yellow card) 75'	(substituted off) 77'
LB	3	(Spain) Miquel Soler
DM	5	(Spain) Luis Milla
RM	8	(Colombia) Freddy Rincón		(substituted off) 46'
LM	7	(Spain) Luis Enrique	(yellow card) 6'
AM	10	(Denmark) Michael Laudrup
SS	11	(Spain) José Amavisca		(substituted off) 46'
CF	9	(Chile) Iván Zamorano
Substitutes:
MF	16	(Spain) Míchel		(substituted on) 46'
FW	14	(Spain) Raúl		(substituted on) 46'
DF	15	(Spain) Nando		(substituted on) 77'
Manager:
(Argentina) Jorge Valdano

GK	13	(Spain) Juan Canales
RB	3	(Spain) Luis López Rekarte
CB	2	(Spain) Voro
CB	4	(Spain) José Luis Ribera
CB	5	(Federal Republic of Yugoslavia) Miroslav Đukić
LB	7	(Spain) Nando		(substituted off) 72'
CM	12	(Spain) Donato	(yellow card) 38'
CM	8	(Spain) Alfredo		(substituted off) 27'
AM	10	(Spain) Fran (c)
CF	9	(Russia) Dmitri Radchenko		(substituted off) 36'
CF	11	(Brazil) Bebeto
Substitutes:
FW	16	(Spain) Javier Manjarín		(substituted on) 27'
FW	14	(Spain) Txiki Begiristain		(substituted on) 36'
DF	6	(Spain) Paco Jémez		(substituted on) 72'
Manager:
(Wales) John Toshack

== See also ==
- 1995–96 La Liga
- 1995–96 Copa del Rey
- 1995–96 Deportivo de La Coruña season
- 1995–96 Real Madrid CF season
