= Adolfo Aldana =

Spanish footballer (born 1966)

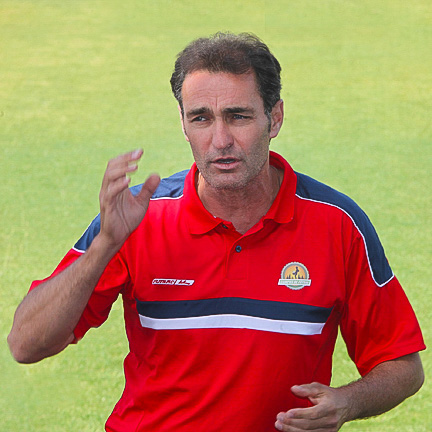
- Aldana in 2013

Personal information
- Full name: Adolfo Aldana Torres
- Date of birth: 5 January 1966 (age 60)
- Place of birth: San Roque, Spain
- Height: 1.88 m (6 ft 2 in)
- Position: Midfielder

Team information
- Current team: Andalusia (coach)

Youth career
- Linense
- 1984–1985: Real Madrid

Senior career*
Years	Team	Apps	(Gls)
1985–1988	Real Madrid B	73	(21)
1988–1992	Real Madrid	73	(12)
1992–1996	Deportivo La Coruña	96	(19)
1996–1998	Espanyol	10	(0)
1998–1999	Mérida	25	(2)
Total		277	(54)

International career
1988	Spain U21	2	(0)
1993–1994	Spain	4	(1)

Managerial career
- 2007–: Andalusia
- * Club domestic league appearances and goals

Adolfo Aldana Torres (born 5 January 1966) is a Spanish former professional footballer who played as a right midfielder.

Over 11 seasons, he amassed La Liga totals of 179 matches and 31 goals, mainly with Real Madrid and Deportivo with which he won a total of nine major titles.

== Club career ==
Aldana was born in San Roque, Province of Cádiz, Andalusia. Brought through the ranks of La Liga powerhouse Real Madrid, he found opportunities hard to come by as he was mainly barred in the starting XI by legendary Míchel. However, he still managed to produce with limited playing time at the club – for instance, in the 1989–90 season, in a final league title, he scored five goals in only 13 matches – and left Real with 97 official appearances, a departure which coincided with the signing of Sporting de Gijón's Luis Enrique.

Aldana signed with up-and-coming Deportivo de La Coruña in 1992, and reached international status at the Galicians while an instrumental figure in the side's lineups, partnering Fran and Mauro Silva in midfield. A serious knee injury would also leave him out of action for the entirety of his second year.

Aldana closed out his career following two years at RCD Espanyol (which included another campaign away from the pitches due to physical problems) and one with CP Mérida (Segunda División), retiring at the age of 33.

== International career ==
Aldana earned four caps for Spain over a one-year span. His debut came on 24 February 1993 in a 1994 FIFA World Cup qualifier against Lithuania, at Seville: brought from the bench, he scored the last goal in the 5–0 win, but his injury at Deportivo eventually prevented a selection for the final stages.

After obtaining his coaching degree, Aldana eventually became manager of the Andalusia autonomous team. His first match in charge was on 27 December 2007, in a 4–1 friendly victory over Zambia at the Estadio Municipal de Chapín.

=== International goal ===
Score and result list Spain's goal tally first, score column indicates score after Aldana goal.

International goal scored by Adolfo Aldana
No.	Date	Venue	Opponent	Score	Result	Competition
1	24 February 1993	Benito Villamarín, Seville, Spain	Lithuania	5–0	5–0	1994 World Cup qualification

== Honours ==
Real Madrid

- La Liga: 1987–88, 1988–89, 1989–90
- Copa del Rey: 1988–89
- Supercopa de España: 1990

Deportivo

- Copa del Rey: 1994–95
- Supercopa de España: 1995
