= Voro (footballer) =

Spanish footballer

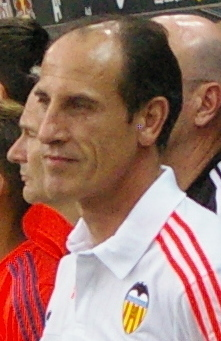
- Voro with Valencia in 2015

Personal information
- Full name: Salvador González Marco
- Date of birth: 9 October 1963 (age 63)
- Place of birth: L'Alcúdia, Spain
- Height: 1.82 m (6 ft 0 in)
- Position: Centre-back

Youth career
- Valencia

Senior career*
Years	Team	Apps	(Gls)
1982–1984	Valencia B		
1984–1993	Valencia	245	(10)
1984–1985	→ Tenerife (loan)	43	(2)
1993–1996	Deportivo La Coruña	102	(1)
1996–1999	Logroñés	45	(1)
Total		435	(14)

International career
1993–1995	Spain	9	(0)

Managerial career
- 2002–2004: Valencia B
- 2008: Valencia (interim)
- 2012: Valencia (caretaker)
- 2015: Valencia (caretaker)
- 2016: Valencia (caretaker)
- 2016–2017: Valencia
- 2017–2020: Valencia (assistant)
- 2020: Valencia (interim)
- 2020–2021: Valencia (assistant)
- 2021: Valencia (interim)
- 2023: Valencia (interim)
- * Club domestic league appearances and goals

Salvador González Marco (born 9 October 1963), known as Voro, is a Spanish former professional footballer who played as a central defender.

During his career, he played mostly for Valencia and Deportivo (a total of 11 La Liga seasons, 318 matches), also coaching the former club on several occasions.

Voro represented Spain at the 1994 World Cup. After retiring, he had several stints as manager of Valencia.

== Club career ==
Born in L'Alcúdia, Valencian Community, Voro graduated from hometown Valencia's youth academy, going on to represent their reserves in his first two years as a senior. A one-and-a-half-year loan with Tenerife in the Segunda División notwithstanding as he was performing his conscription in the city, he played eight seasons – seven in La Liga – with the Che's first team, which included 37 games with two goals in 1989–90 as they finished second.

Subsequently, Voro joined Deportivo de La Coruña, being an instrumental part in the rise of Super Depor during the early to mid-1990s. Having started the 1996–97 campaign with the Galicians he finished it with Logroñés, retiring in the second tier in 1999.

== International career ==
Voro earned nine caps for the Spain national team in two years, and was part of the squad at the 1994 FIFA World Cup. His debut came on 13 October 1993, in a decisive World Cup qualifier against the Republic of Ireland in Lansdowne Road, Dublin (90 minutes played, 3–1 win).

== Managerial career ==
On 21 April 2008, after several years working with Valencia as match delegate, Voro became manager of his former club following the sacking of Ronald Koeman. After saving the team from relegation with four wins in five matches, he was replaced by Unai Emery for 2008–09 and reinstated in his previous post.

Voro was appointed interim manager of Valencia on 30 November 2015 following the departure of Nuno Espírito Santo, before the position was filled by Gary Neville two days later. He led the side to a 1–1 draw against Barcelona at the Mestalla Stadium, in his only game in charge.

On 20 September 2016, Voro took the interim post for a fourth time after the dismissal of Pako Ayestarán. The same befell him on the penultimate day of the year, following Cesare Prandelli's resignation.

Voro was confirmed as manager 10 January 2017, until the end of the season. He returned for a sixth interim spell on 29 June 2020, when Albert Celades was fired with six matches to go. Only 11 months later, he was back in charge following the dismissal of Javi Gracia.

On 30 January 2023, Voro replaced Gennaro Gattuso as Valencia stood 14th in the table, again on an interim basis. After three losses in as many matches, he was replaced by former club player Rubén Baraja.

== Managerial statistics ==
As of 11 February 2023

Managerial record by team and tenure
Team	Nat	From	To	Record								Ref.
Team	Nat	From	To	G	W	D	L	GF	GA	GD	Win %	Ref.
Valencia B	(Spain)	1 July 2002	16 February 2004	63	23	13	27	80	91	−11	36.51	
Valencia (interim)	(Spain)	21 April 2008	22 May 2008	5	4	0	1	12	8	+4	80.00	
Valencia (caretaker)	(Spain)	1 December 2012	6 December 2012	1	1	0	0	1	0	+1	100.00	
Valencia (caretaker)	(Spain)	30 November 2015	6 December 2015	2	1	1	0	4	2	+2	50.00	
Valencia (caretaker)	(Spain)	20 September 2016	3 October 2016	3	2	0	1	4	4	+0	66.67	
Valencia	(Spain)	30 December 2016	21 May 2017	25	10	4	11	37	42	−5	40.00	
Valencia (interim)	(Spain)	29 June 2020	19 July 2020	6	2	1	3	5	7	−2	33.33	
Valencia (interim)	(Spain)	3 May 2021	22 May 2021	4	2	1	1	7	2	+5	50.00	
Valencia (interim)	(Spain)	30 January 2023	14 February 2023	3	0	0	3	1	5	−4	0.00	
Career total				112	45	20	47	151	161	−10	40.18	—

== Honours ==
Valencia

- Segunda División: 1986–87

Deportivo

- Copa del Rey: 1994–95
- Supercopa de España: 1995
