= José Luis Ribera =

Spanish footballer and manager

Personal information
- Full name: José Luis Ribera Uranga
- Date of birth: 1 June 1965 (age 61)
- Place of birth: Azkoitia, Spain
- Height: 1.82 m (5 ft 11 1/2 in)
- Position: Centre-back

Youth career
- Real Sociedad

Senior career*
Years	Team	Apps	(Gls)
1984–1986	San Sebastián		
1984	Real Sociedad	1	(0)
1986–1987	Eibar	37	(1)
1987–1989	Sestao Sport	59	(3)
1989–1991	Real Burgos	69	(1)
1991–1996	Deportivo La Coruña	129	(3)
1997–1998	Rayo Vallecano	16	(0)
Total		311	(8)

International career
1993–1994	Basque Country	2	(0)

Managerial career
- 1999–2000: Antiguoko (youth)
- 2000–2002: Lagun Onak (youth)
- 2003–2004: Eibar (assistant)
- 2004: Eibar
- 2005–2006: Real Sociedad (youth)
- 2006–2007: Real Sociedad (assistant)
- 2007–2011: Deportivo La Coruña (assistant)
- 2012: Villarreal (assistant)
- 2012–2013: Sestao River
- 2017–2018: Real Unión
- 2018–2021: Beasain
- * Club domestic league appearances and goals

José Luis Ribera Uranga (born 1 June 1965) is a Spanish former professional footballer who played as a central defender. He also worked as a manager.

== Honours ==
=== Player ===
Real Burgos

- Segunda División: 1989–90

Deportivo

- Copa del Rey: 1994–95
- Supercopa de España: 1995
