= Donato (footballer) =

Spanish footballer and manager (born 1962)

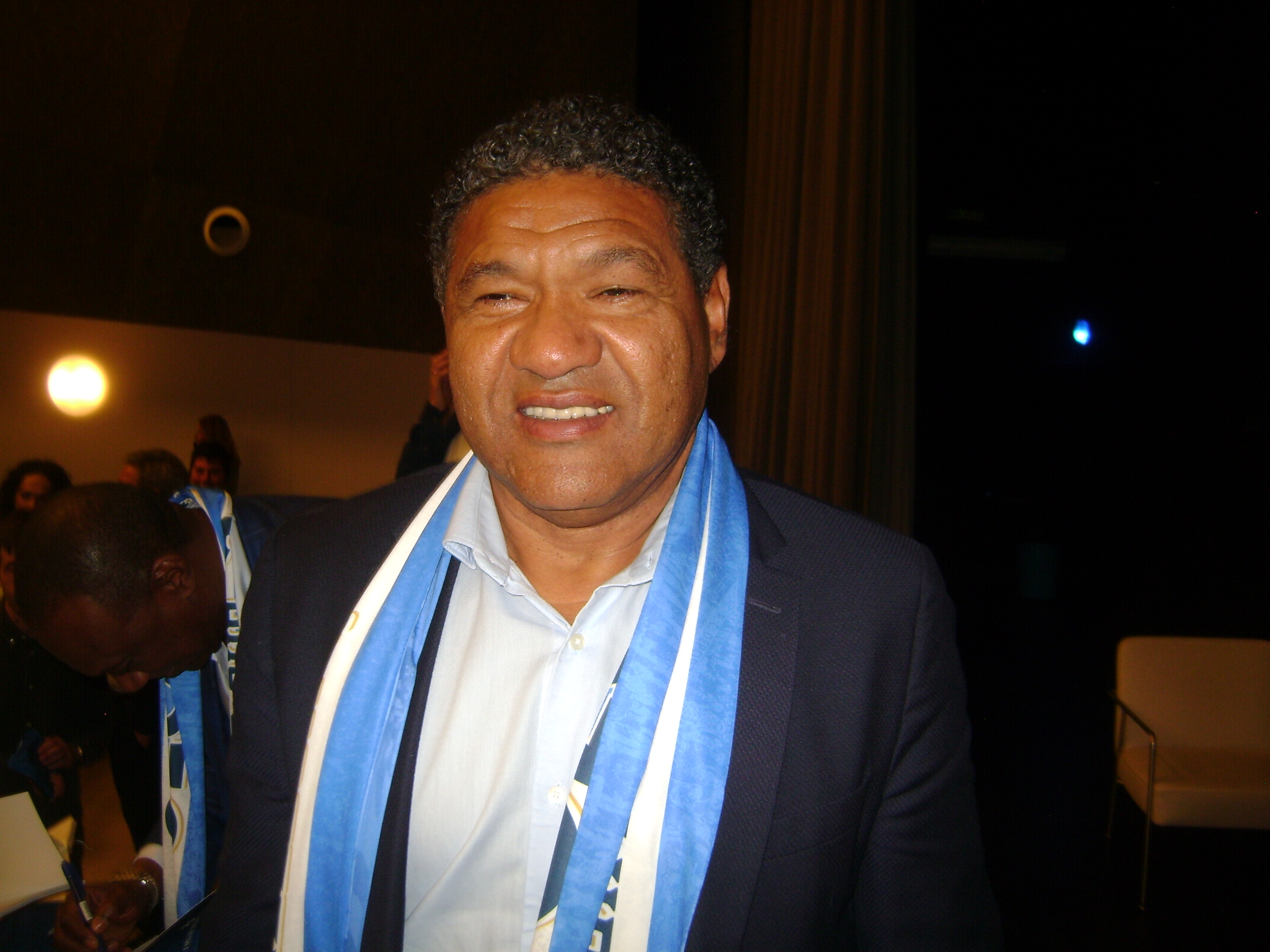
- Donato in 2025

Personal information
- Full name: Donato Gama da Silva
- Date of birth: 30 December 1962 (age 63)
- Place of birth: Rio de Janeiro, Brazil
- Height: 1.78 m (5 ft 10 in)
- Positions: Centre-back; midfielder

Senior career*
Years	Team	Apps	(Gls)
1981–1982	America (RJ)	36	(1)
1983–1988	Vasco da Gama	49	(0)
1988–1993	Atlético Madrid	163	(11)
1993–2003	Deportivo La Coruña	303	(38)
Total		551	(50)

International career
1994–1996	Spain	12	(3)

Managerial career
- 2015–2016: Viveiro
- * Club domestic league appearances and goals

Donato Gama da Silva (born 30 December 1962), known simply as Donato, is a former professional footballer. Having begun as a central midfielder, he was later deployed as a central defender.

He spent most of his 22-year senior career in Spain – 589 competitive games and 68 goals – most notably with Deportivo de La Coruña, being part of the Super Depor squads that won several titles, including the 1999–2000 La Liga. He also held the record for most appearances in the competition by a player born outside of Spain, with 466.

Born in Brazil, Donato represented Spain at Euro 1996.

== Club career ==
Born in Rio de Janeiro, Donato began his career with America in his hometown, switching to neighbours Vasco da Gama in 1984 and remaining there the following four years, after which he joined Spain's Atlético Madrid as one of the first signings of elusive chairman Jesús Gil. With the Colchoneros, he won back-to-back Copa del Rey trophies and totalled 197 appearances.

Donato moved to Deportivo de La Coruña in summer 1993. alongside players like Bebeto, Mauro Silva, Miroslav Đukić and Fran, he was crucial to the team's firm establishment in both La Liga and European competitions, as he scored an impressive 18 league goals over his first two seasons, often from free kicks, one of his main assets. He continued to feature heavily for the Galicians subsequently, helping the club win two domestic cups and the historic 1999–2000 national championship (netting three times in 29 games); during his spell at the Estadio Riazor, he appeared in 393 matches and added 54 goals.

On 19 January 2003, Donato scored a 50th-minute header in a 2–1 league win over Athletic Bilbao; in the process, at the age of 40 years and 20 days, he became the first-ever player to do so after his 40th birthday, thus becoming the oldest scorer in Spain's top-flight history by breaking a 43-year-old record held by Barcelona's César Rodríguez, who had achieved this with Elche in the 1959–60 season aged 39 years and 277 days. He extended this record four months later, when he equalised an eventual 2–1 loss against Valencia on 17 May.

Donato began his coaching career in Greece, as assistant at Aris Thessaloniki. In 2008, he was appointed youth team manager of lowly Montañeros in the A Coruña region.

On 4 November 2015, it was announced that Donato would take over as head coach of Viveiro in the Galician regional championships.

== International career ==
After becoming a citizen of Spain in 1990, Donato was called to the national team, and earned 12 caps in a two-year span. His debut arrived on 16 November 1994, starting and scoring in a 3–0 UEFA Euro 1996 qualifier win against Denmark at the Ramón Sánchez-Pizjuán Stadium.

Subsequently, Donato was called up for the squad at the final stages in England, making a substitute appearance in their opening draw with Bulgaria at Elland Road.

== Style of play ==
Donato was a strong but technical player, who was able both to destroy the opposition's attacks and to help generate his own team's. He was also a reliable set-piece taker.

== Career statistics ==
Scores and results list Spain's goal tally first, score column indicates score after each Donato goal.

List of international goals scored by Donato
No.	Date	Venue	Opponent	Score	Result	Competition
1	16 November 1994	Ramón Sánchez-Pizjuán Stadium, Seville, Spain	Denmark	2–0	3–0	Euro 1996 qualifying
2	17 December 1994	Constant Vanden Stock Stadium, Brussels, Belgium	Belgium	2–1	4–1	Euro 1996 qualifying
3	18 January 1995	Estadio Riazor, A Coruña, Spain	Uruguay	2–2	2–2	Friendly

== Honours ==
Atlético Madrid

- Copa del Rey: 1990–91, 1991–92

Deportivo

- La Liga: 1999–2000
- Copa del Rey: 1994–95, 2001–02
- Supercopa de España: 1995, 2000

== See also ==
- List of Atlético Madrid players (+100)
- List of La Liga players (400+ appearances)
- List of Spain international footballers born outside Spain
