= Claudio Barragán =

Spanish footballer and manager

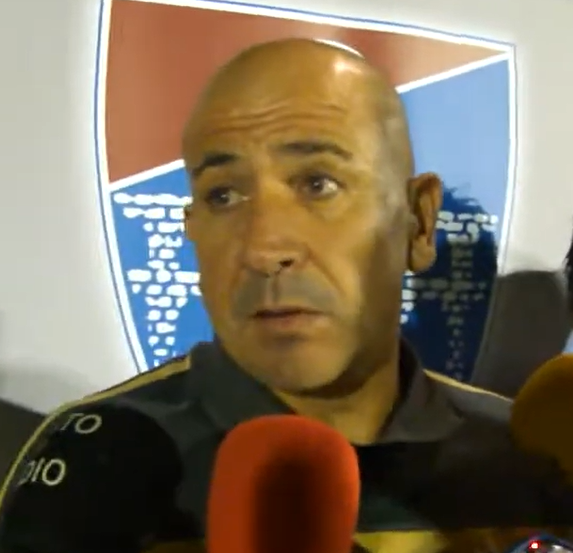
- Barragán in 2011

Personal information
- Full name: Claudio Barragán Escobar
- Date of birth: 10 April 1964 (age 62)
- Place of birth: Manises, Spain
- Height: 1.77 m (5 ft 10 in)
- Position: Striker

Youth career
- Levante

Senior career*
Years	Team	Apps	(Gls)
1980–1984	Levante	40	(3)
1982–1983	→ Ceuta (loan)		
1984–1989	Elche	150	(33)
1989–1991	Mallorca	57	(11)
1991–1995	Deportivo La Coruña	114	(35)
1995–1996	Salamanca	42	(12)
1996–2000	Elche	103	(19)
2002–2004	Alone		
Total		506	(113)

International career
1992–1993	Spain	6	(0)

Managerial career
- 2004–2008: Elche (assistant)
- 2008–2009: Elche
- 2011–2014: Ponferradina
- 2014–2016: Cádiz
- 2016–2017: Mirandés
- 2017–2018: Hércules
- 2020–2021: Recreativo
- 2025: Eldense B
- 2025–2026: Eldense
- * Club domestic league appearances and goals

Claudio Barragán Escobar (born 10 April 1964) is a Spanish former professional footballer who played as a striker. He is currently a manager.

His career was closely associated to Elche as both a player and manager, but he was also an important part of the Deportivo de La Coruña teams of the 90s. He amassed La Liga totals of 259 games and 66 goals over nine seasons, also representing in the competition Mallorca and Salamanca, and added 181 matches and 32 goals in the Segunda División.

Barragán appeared for Spain in 1992 and 1993. He started working as a coach in 2008.

== Club career ==
Known as Claudio in his playing days, he was born in Manises, Province of Valencia, and made his senior debut at only 16 with local Levante. He scored three goals over two full Segunda División seasons – being relegated in 1982 – and was also loaned to lowly Ceuta.

In summer 1984, Claudio signed for neighbouring Elche, making his La Liga debut on 18 November 1984 in a 1–0 away loss against Español and finishing his first season with 18 games and two goals, including one in a 6–1 defeat at Real Madrid as the team were eventually relegated; he would achieve another promotion with the club in 1988, followed by immediate relegation.

After two top-flight seasons in Mallorca, reaching the Copa del Rey final in 1990–91, Claudio joined Deportivo de La Coruña in the 1991 off-season. He netted ten times in 34 matches in his first year as the Galicians narrowly avoided relegation, beating Real Betis in the promotion/relegation playoffs.

In the following summer, however, the club bought Brazilians Bebeto and Mauro Silva, amongst others, and Super Depor came to fruition, achieving two top-two and one top-three finishes. Claudio formed an extremely efficient attacking partnership with the former, with the pair combining for 67 league goals from 1992 to 1994; he won the only trophy of his career in 1995, the Spanish Cup against Valencia, and also scored four goals in nine games in the UEFA Cup over two seasons.

Claudio lost his importance at Deportivo in the 1994–95 campaign after the emergence of younger Javier Manjarín and the summer signings of Emil Kostadinov and Julio Salinas; he left the team prior to the start of the following season when new manager John Toshack was appointed. Aged 31, he signed with Salamanca, scoring 11 goals in his first year but being relegated from the top tier.

In December 1996, after suffering an injury and losing his starting place with the Castile and León side, Claudio returned to Elche, helping the club to two promotions from Segunda División B before retiring professionally at the age of 36. After two years out of football, he played a couple of seasons with amateurs Alone from Guardamar del Segura, in Alicante.

== International career ==
During his spell with Deportivo, Claudio earned six caps for Spain. His debut came on 14 October 1992 in a 1994 FIFA World Cup qualifier against Northern Ireland (0–0 in Belfast).

== Coaching career ==
Barragán joined Elche's coaching staff shortly after retiring, going on to work as an assistant with the club. Just seven games into 2008–09, he replaced fired David Vidal at the helm of the first team, finally leading them to the 12th position; he himself was sacked in early October 2009, after roughly one year in charge.

On 14 January 2011, Barragán was appointed at Ponferradina also in the second division, eventually not being able to prevent relegation. He won immediate promotion with a play-off win over Tenerife, and remained at the club until his contract expired in June 2014.

Barragán replaced the dismissed Antonio Calderón as manager of Cádiz in the third tier on 24 November 2014. In his first season, the side won their group and dispatched Hércules in the play-off semi-finals before losing the final 3–1 on aggregate to Athletic Bilbao B; he was relieved of his duties on 18 April 2016, when a run of one point in four matches put the Andalusians in fourth place.

For 42 days at the end of 2016 and the start of the new year, Barragán managed second-division Mirandés, winning once and losing three of his four games in charge. In October 2017, he succeeded Gustavo Siviero at Hércules one league below. He was fired the following February, with them seven points off the play-offs and having not won in 2018.

On 11 February 2020, Barragán succeeded Alberto Monteagudo at 13th-placed Recreativo de Huelva; he signed for the rest of the campaign, with the option of one more if the team qualified for the national cup. He was dismissed on 24 January 2021 as the club eventually suffered a double relegation to the fifth tier.

On 4 March 2025, after more than four years of inactivity, Barragán joined Eldense as head coach of their reserves in the Lliga Comunitat. On 19 October, he took over the first team on a temporary basis following Javier Cabello's sacking, being confirmed on the role on 14 November. He achieved second-division promotion at the end of the season, but was fired on 6 September 2026.

== Managerial statistics ==
As of 13 September 2026

Managerial record by team and tenure
Team	Nat	From	To	Record								Ref
Team	Nat	From	To	G	W	D	L	GF	GA	GD	Win %	Ref
Elche	(Spain)	13 October 2008	4 October 2009	44	14	13	17	56	57	−1	31.82	
Ponferradina	(Spain)	14 January 2011	12 June 2014	160	63	43	54	207	179	+28	39.38	
Cádiz	(Spain)	24 November 2014	18 April 2016	72	38	16	18	109	58	+51	52.78	
Mirandés	(Spain)	7 December 2016	17 January 2017	4	1	0	3	2	11	−9	25.00	
Hércules	(Spain)	17 October 2017	12 February 2018	16	4	10	2	14	12	+2	25.00	
Recreativo	(Spain)	11 February 2020	25 January 2021	15	5	2	8	17	14	+3	33.33	
Eldense B	(Spain)	4 March 2025	20 October 2025	14	9	3	2	27	11	+16	64.29	
Eldense	(Spain)	20 October 2025	6 September 2026	38	20	10	8	59	40	+19	52.63	
Total				363	154	97	112	491	382	+109	42.42	–

== Honours ==
Deportivo

- Copa del Rey: 1994–95
