= Mariano Hoyas =

Spanish footballer (born 1970)

Personal information
- Full name: Mariano Hoyas de la Cruz
- Date of birth: 19 September 1970 (age 56)
- Place of birth: Plasencia, Spain
- Height: 1.70 m (5 ft 7 in)
- Position: Right back

Youth career
- Plasencia

Senior career*
Years	Team	Apps	(Gls)
1989–1990	Plasencia		
1990–1991	Deportivo B		
1991–1994	Deportivo La Coruña	56	(0)
1994–1996	Celta	63	(1)
1996–2000	Mérida	121	(0)
2000–2002	Recreativo	5	(0)
2002–2003	Cartagonova	34	(0)
Total		279	(1)

International career
1991	Spain U23	3	(0)
- * Club domestic league appearances and goals

Mariano Hoyas de la Cruz (born 19 September 1970 in Plasencia, Extremadura) is a Spanish retired footballer who played as a right back.
