= Paco Jémez =

Spanish footballer and manager

- Jémez in 2023

Personal information
- Full name: Francisco Jémez Martín
- Date of birth: 18 April 1970 (age 56)
- Place of birth: Las Palmas, Spain
- Height: 1.80 m (5 ft 11 in)
- Position: Centre-back

Team information
- Current team: Raja CA (manager)

Youth career
- Córdoba

Senior career*
Years	Team	Apps	(Gls)
1988–1991	Córdoba	81	(4)
1991–1992	Murcia	35	(0)
1992–1993	Rayo Vallecano	38	(0)
1993–1998	Deportivo La Coruña	94	(1)
1998–2004	Zaragoza	168	(1)
2004	Rayo Vallecano	17	(0)
2005	Lugo	0	(0)
Total		433	(6)

International career
1998–2001	Spain	21	(0)

Managerial career
- 2007: Alcalá
- 2007–2008: Córdoba
- 2009: Cartagena
- 2010–2011: Las Palmas
- 2011–2012: Córdoba
- 2012–2016: Rayo Vallecano
- 2016: Granada
- 2016–2017: Cruz Azul
- 2017–2018: Las Palmas
- 2019–2020: Rayo Vallecano
- 2021–2022: Ibiza
- 2022–2024: Tractor
- 2024–2025: Ibiza
- 2026: West Ham United (assistant)
- 2026: Raja CA
- * Club domestic league appearances and goals

Francisco "Paco" Jémez Martín (born 18 April 1970) is a Spanish football manager and former player who played as a central defender. He is the head coach of Botola Pro club Raja CA and Caracas FC in Venezuela.

Over 11 seasons, he played 269 La Liga matches in representation of three teams, mainly Deportivo and Zaragoza. He appeared for Spain at Euro 2000.

Jémez started working as a manager in 2007, going on to work with several clubs.

== Club career ==
Jémez was born in Las Palmas, Canary Islands. During his career, he played for Córdoba, Real Murcia, Rayo Vallecano (first appearing in La Liga and playing all 38 matches of the season), Deportivo de La Coruña (only totalling ten games in his first two seasons as the club achieved two consecutive runner-up spots, being more used afterwards) and Real Zaragoza, which he helped to victory in the 2000–01 edition of the Copa del Rey. In January 2004 he returned to Rayo, now in the Segunda División.

After one year out of football, Jémez returned with Lugo – Tercera División – before retiring at the age of 35.

== International career ==
Over almost three years, Jémez played 21 times for the Spain national team. His debut was on 23 September 1998 in a friendly against Russia in Granada, and he was a participant at UEFA Euro 2000, taking part in three matches in an eventual quarter-final exit.

== Coaching career ==
=== Spain ===
Jémez took up coaching in 2007, first with lowly Alcalá. He moved to the second division the following campaign, with Córdoba, being sacked with eleven matches to go.

In early 2009, Jémez signed with Cartagena, ultimately being the coach that earned the Murcia club a first ever promotion to the second tier. He left in July.

On 12 April 2010, following Sergije Krešić's dismissal, Jémez was appointed coach at struggling Las Palmas in division two. He eventually led his hometown side safe from the relegation zone in a 17th-place finish, being fired on 27 February 2011.

After taking Córdoba to the first round in the second-division promotion playoffs, Jémez joined his former club Rayo on 22 June 2012. After leading the team to their best-ever ranking in the top flight, eighth, he renewed his contract until June 2015.

On 26 May 2016, after Rayo's top-tier relegation, Jémez failed to agree new terms and became manager of Granada on 20 June. However, on 28 September, he was dismissed after only six games in charge, no wins and a club-worst start to a season in more than 70 years.

=== Mexico ===
On 28 November 2016, Jémez was named head coach of Cruz Azul in the Mexican Liga MX. He led the team to their first playoff appearance in three years but, in November 2017, decided not to renew his contract and left.

=== Back to Spain ===
Jémez returned to Las Palmas on 21 December 2017, becoming the third permanent manager in charge of the club during the campaign. He rejoined Rayo Vallecano in late March 2019, replacing Míchel who had been dismissed two days earlier after losing seven league games in a row, which left the team at risk of top-flight relegation, and agreeing to a deal until June 2020; they eventually went down in last place.

On 26 December 2021, after more than a year of inactivity, Jémez took over second-division newcomers Ibiza until the end of the season. He managed to avoid relegation, but still left as his contract expired on 31 May.

=== Iran and return to Ibiza ===
In December 2022, Jémez went back abroad, being appointed at Tractor in the Persian Gulf Pro League. He returned to both Spain and Ibiza on 12 November 2024, with the team now in the Primera Federación.

Jémez was sacked by Ibiza on 21 October 2025, after a poor start to the season.

=== West Ham United ===
On 15 January 2026, Jémez joined Premier League club West Ham United as first-team coach under his former Deportivo teammate Nuno Espírito Santo. Following relegation, he left.

=== Raja CA ===
On 1 September 2026, Jémez became head coach of Raja CA in the Moroccan Botola Pro.

== Personal life ==
Jémez's father, Francisco Crespo Aguilar (known professionally as Lucas de Écija (1929–2018)), was a flamenco singer who released two records. He himself nearly embraced the sport of golf, having a 1.4 handicap.

== Managerial statistics ==
As of 26 October 2025

Managerial record by team and tenure
Team	From	To	Record								Ref.
Team	From	To	G	W	D	L	GF	GA	GD	Win %	Ref.
Alcalá	25 March 2007	28 June 2007	12	5	4	3	21	11	+10	41.67	
Córdoba	28 June 2007	31 March 2008	32	7	15	10	40	46	−6	21.88	
Cartagena	3 February 2009	1 July 2009	19	9	7	3	33	16	+17	47.37	
Las Palmas	12 April 2010	27 February 2011	37	9	13	15	52	69	−17	24.32	
Córdoba	8 June 2011	13 June 2012	50	23	13	14	60	54	+6	46.00	
Rayo Vallecano	22 June 2012	26 May 2016	164	55	29	80	206	303	−97	33.54	
Granada	20 June 2016	28 September 2016	6	0	2	4	7	15	−8	0.00	
Cruz Azul	28 November 2016	27 November 2017	48	17	18	13	56	52	+4	35.42	
Las Palmas	21 December 2017	25 May 2018	23	2	6	15	12	41	−29	8.70	
Rayo Vallecano	20 March 2019	31 July 2020	56	17	25	14	76	73	+3	30.36	
Ibiza	26 December 2021	31 May 2022	21	7	6	8	34	36	−2	33.33	
Tractor	6 December 2022	15 April 2024	45	24	8	13	65	45	+20	53.33	
Ibiza	12 November 2024	21 October 2025	36	17	7	12	51	38	+13	47.22	
Total			549	192	153	204	713	799	−86	34.97	—

== Honours ==
=== Player ===
Deportivo

- Supercopa de España: 1995

Zaragoza

- Copa del Rey: 2000–01

=== Manager ===
Cartagena

- Segunda División B: 2008–09
