= Miroslav Đukić =

Serbian footballer (born 1966)

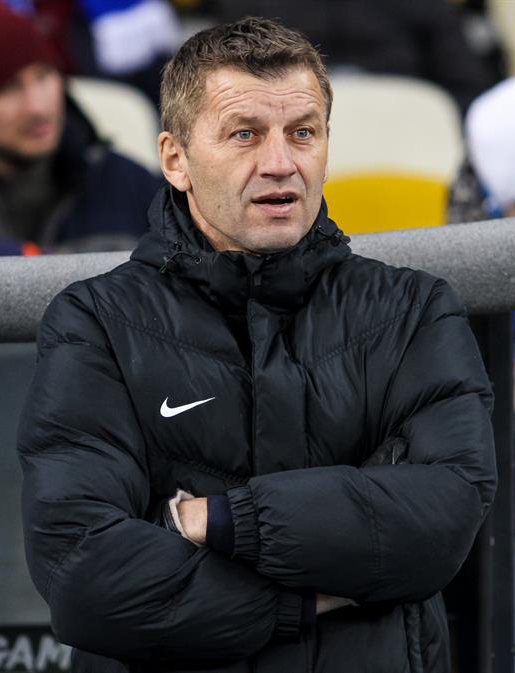
- Đukić as Partizan manager in 2017

Personal information
- Date of birth: 19 February 1966 (age 60)
- Place of birth: Šabac, SR Serbia, Yugoslavia
- Height: 1.85 m (6 ft 1 in)
- Position: Sweeper

Senior career*
Years	Team	Apps	(Gls)
1987–1989	Mačva Šabac	62	(3)
1989–1991	Rad	60	(2)
1991–1997	Deportivo La Coruña	217	(7)
1997–2003	Valencia	156	(4)
2003–2004	Tenerife	27	(0)
Total		522	(16)

International career
1991–2001	FR Yugoslavia (Note: Including 2 caps for SFR Yugoslavia.)	48	(2)

Managerial career
- 2006–2007: Serbia U21
- 2007: Partizan
- 2007–2008: Serbia
- 2009: Mouscron
- 2011: Hércules
- 2011–2013: Valladolid
- 2013: Valencia
- 2014–2015: Córdoba
- 2017: Al Shabab
- 2017–2018: Partizan
- 2019–2020: Sporting Gijón
Medal record
Representing Yugoslavia
Silver medal – second place	UEFA U-21 Euro	1990
- * Club domestic league appearances and goals

Miroslav Đukić (Serbian Cyrillic: Мирослав Ђукић, pronounced [mǐroslaʋ dʑǔkitɕ]; born 19 February 1966) is a Serbian football manager and former player who played as a sweeper.

He spent fourteen years of his professional career in Spain, notably at the service of Deportivo de La Coruña and Valencia, amassing La Liga totals of 368 games and 11 goals and winning a combined six major titles for the two teams.

Đukić represented FR Yugoslavia in one World Cup and one European Championship. After retiring, he embarked in a managerial career at both club and international level.

== Playing career ==
=== Club ===
Born in Šabac and living in a small town near Šabac called Štitar in the Socialist Republic of Serbia, Socialist Federal Republic of Yugoslavia, Đukić began his playing career with FK Mačva Šabac, moving in 1989 to Belgrade with FK Rad after reported interest from both national giants FK Partizan and Red Star Belgrade.

In spring 1991, Đukić signed for Deportivo de La Coruña in Spain, who purchased him for 40 million pesetas. He only appeared in five league games for the Galicians until the end of his first season, which ended in La Liga promotion, but, from there onwards, became an undisputed starter, never totalling less than 35 matches and 3,000 minutes of action in five consecutive campaigns, as Super Depor was coming to fruition.

On 15 May 1994, in the league's last round, at home against Valencia CF, Đukić missed a penalty kick in the game's last minute (eventual 0–0 draw), as habitual taker Donato had already been replaced and second option Bebeto refused the responsibility since he failed to score one the previous match. As a result, FC Barcelona were crowned champions instead, and the elegant defender left A Coruña at the end of 1996–97 at the age of 31 as his contract was not renewed.

Subsequently, Đukić joined Valencia, starting in all of the league games he took part in his first three seasons and helping the Che to two consecutive UEFA Champions League finals, both lost. Already as a backup, he made 16 appearances as the club won the first national championship in 31 years in 2002.

Đukić returned to Segunda División after 12 years for the last season of his career, playing for CD Tenerife and retiring at the age of 38, having appeared in exactly 400 matches in the Spanish league (both major levels combined).

=== International ===
Đukić made his debut for Yugoslavia on 27 February 1991, in a 1–1 friendly draw against Turkey in İzmir. He went on to win 48 caps scoring twice, and represented the newly formed FR Yugoslavia at UEFA Euro 2000 (all the games and minutes for the quarter-finalists).

Đukić was also a member of the squad that competed at the 1998 FIFA World Cup, but did not play due to injury. His final international was a September 2001 World Cup qualification match against Slovenia.

== Coaching career ==
=== Serbia U-21 national team and Partizan ===
Đukić earned his coaching license in Spain, and started his new career in July 2006 with Serbia's under-21 team with which he qualified in dramatic fashion for the 2007 UEFA European Championship (3–0 home loss against Sweden, followed by a 5–0 away win).

On 23 January 2007, Đukić was simultaneously named head coach of Partizan, being eventually voted Manager of the Year.

Đukić led the Serbia under-21 team to the final of the 2007 UEFA European Championship, losing against hosts Netherlands. He stepped down shortly thereafter.

On 19 December 2007, Đukić decided not to extend his expired contract with Partizan and was appointed head coach of Serbia. He was replaced at the helm of Partizan by Slaviša Jokanović.

=== Serbia national team ===
On 25 December 2007, Đukić was officially presented as the new head coach of the Serbia national team. He made his debut as head coach against Macedonia in Skopje, on 6 February 2008. The match ended with a score of 1-1. In the next four friendly matches, Đukić recorded defeats against Ukraine (2-0), Russia (2-1) and Germany (2-1) and a draw with the Republic of Ireland (1-1).

Đukić also led Serbia at the 2008 Summer Olympics in Beijing. Before the tournament, Đukić had a brief public row with Partizan and several other European clubs who did not wish to let their players go to Beijing. At the Olympic tournament, Serbia was eliminated in the group stage with only one point won (playing Australia 1-1, Ivory Coast 2-4 and Argentina 0-2).

On 19 August 2008, the Executive Board of the Football Association of Serbia announced that Miroslav Đukić is no longer the manager of Serbia and that Radomir Antić will be appointed in his place, reasoning that Đukić was replaced due to "bad results in friendly matches of the senior national team this year, as well as failure at the Olympic Games in Beijing". Đukić was Serbia manager for only eight months, and he was replaced without ever leading the national team in a competitive match.

=== Belgium, Spain and UAE ===
On 11 June 2009 he signed for R.E. Mouscron in Belgium, replacing Enzo Scifo and being joined at the Pro League team by former Valencia teammates Amedeo Carboni and Juan Sánchez, who acted as sporting director and technical director, respectively; all left shortly after, as the club folded due to severe economical problems.

In late March 2011, Đukić became Hércules CF manager after Esteban Vigo was sacked. His first match in charge was a 3–1 away win against Real Sociedad, but the Valencians ultimately suffered top-flight relegation.

On 6 July 2011, Đukić was appointed at another second division side, agreeing to a three-year contract with Real Valladolid. In early June 2013, after leading them to promotion in his first season – via the playoffs – and the 14th position in the second, he replaced Ernesto Valverde at the helm of former club Valencia.

Đukić was relieved of his duties on 16 December 2013, following the team's eighth loss of the season, 3–0 at Atlético Madrid which left it in ninth place. He was revealed as the new Córdoba CF manager on 20 October 2014, succeeding Albert Ferrer.

On 23 January 2017, Đukić became the head coach of Al Shabab, but was forced out after the club merged with Al Ahli to form Shabab Al Ahli.

=== Return to Partizan ===
At the beginning of June 2017, Đukić was appointed head coach of Partizan for the second time in his coaching career. He signed a two-year contract, replacing Marko Nikolić, who previously resigned. Đukić made his comeback debut on the Partizan bench in the 2nd round of Champions League qualification against Budućnost Podgorica. With Đukić on the bench, Partizan managed to eliminate Budućnost in two matches, but was then eliminated by Olympiacos in the 3rd round of qualification. After that, Partizan managed to win a place in the group stage of the Europa League after eliminating Videoton. Under the leadership of Đukić, Partizan managed to pass the group stage of the Europa League in competition with Dynamo Kyiv, Young Boys and Skënderbeu, thus securing a "European spring" after thirteen years. In the round of 16 of the Europa League, Partizan was eliminated by Viktoria Plzeň.

Although he had success in Europe, Đukić failed to defend the title of Serbian champion with Partizan. In March 2018, the usually calm Đukić made headlines after he used profanities at a press conference, saying that he "was born in fucking Štitar and not sunny Valencia" and that he was "a bum like all of you here." He finished the 2017–18 competitive season in the Serbian Superliga in second place, 17 points behind first-place Red Star. He managed to defend the trophy in the Serbian Cup, after defeating Mladost Lučani in the final (2–1). In May, Đukić arose minor controversy when he said "if Marko Janković manages to overcome the Montenegrin in him, he will be a great player."

Đukić also started the 2018–19 season on the bench of Partizan. He led the club in the first two rounds of the 2018–19 competition in the Serbian Superliga, where in the first round they were defeated by Radnik Surdulica and then in the second round they defeated Dinamo Vranje. He also led the black and whites in the qualification for the Europa League, where first Rudar Pljevlja and then Lithuanian FK Trakai were eliminated. He again arose controversy before the latter match-up for referring to Trakai as "not being some Indians with feathers." Despite the fact that he led Partizan to the 3rd round of qualification for the Europa League, Đukić was dismissed on 3 August 2018 and replaced by Zoran Mirković.

=== Sporting Gijón ===
Đukić came back to the Spanish second tier on 22 December 2019, taking the helm of Sporting de Gijón. Following a 13th-place finish, he was replaced by David Gallego the following July.

== Career statistics ==
=== Club ===
Appearances and goals by club, season and competition
Club	Season	League			Cup		Continental		Other		Total	
Club	Season	Division	Apps	Goals	Apps	Goals	Apps	Goals	Apps	Goals	Apps	Goals
Mačva Šabac	1987–88	Yugoslav Second League	28	1	—		—		—		28	1
Mačva Šabac	1988–89	Yugoslav Second League	34	2			—		—		34	2
Mačva Šabac	Total		62	3			—		—		62	3
Rad	1989–90	Yugoslav First League	31	1			2	0	—		33	1
Rad	1990–91	Yugoslav First League	29	1			—		—		29	1
Rad	Total		60	2			2	0	—		62	2
Deportivo La Coruña	1990–91	Segunda División	5	0	0	0	—		—		5	0
Deportivo La Coruña	1991–92	La Liga	38	3	12	2	—		1 (Note: Appearances in La Liga play-offs)	0	51	5
Deportivo La Coruña	1992–93	La Liga	38	1	4	1	—		—		42	2
Deportivo La Coruña	1993–94	La Liga	36	1	2	0	6	0	—		44	1
Deportivo La Coruña	1994–95	La Liga	36	2	7	1	6	0	—		49	3
Deportivo La Coruña	1995–96	La Liga	35	0	2	0	7	0	2 (Note: Appearances in Supercopa de España)	0	46	0
Deportivo La Coruña	1996–97	La Liga	29	0	5	1	—		—		34	1
Deportivo La Coruña	Total		217	7	32	5	19	0	3	0	271	12
Valencia	1997–98	La Liga	33	3	3	0	—		—		36	3
Valencia	1998–99	La Liga	32	1	5	0	4	0	—		41	1
Valencia	1999–2000	La Liga	33	0	2	0	16	1	2	0	53	1
Valencia	2000–01	La Liga	34	0	1	0	12	0	—		47	0
Valencia	2001–02	La Liga	16	0	1	0	9	1	—		26	1
Valencia	2002–03	La Liga	8	0	1	0	1	0	—		10	0
Valencia	Total		156	4	13	0	42	2	2	0	213	6
Tenerife	2003–04	Segunda División	27	0	1	0	—		—		28	0
Career total			522	16	46	5	63	2	5	0	636	23

=== International ===
Appearances and goals by national team and year
National team	Year	Apps	Goals
SFR Yugoslavia	1991	2	0
SFR Yugoslavia	1992	0	0
FR Yugoslavia	1993	— (Note: FR Yugoslavia was banned from international football due to UN sanctions.)	
FR Yugoslavia	1994	2	0
FR Yugoslavia	1995	1	0
FR Yugoslavia	1996	5	0
FR Yugoslavia	1997	11	1
FR Yugoslavia	1998	6	0
FR Yugoslavia	1999	7	0
FR Yugoslavia	2000	7	0
FR Yugoslavia	2001	7	1
Total		48	2

== Managerial statistics ==
As of match played 20 July 2020

Managerial record by team and tenure
Team	From	To	Record								Ref
Team	From	To	G	W	D	L	GF	GA	GD	Win %	Ref
Serbia U21	1 July 2006	30 June 2007	12	7	1	4	18	12	+6	58.33	
Partizan	9 January 2007	19 December 2007	39	27	5	7	86	32	+54	69.23	
Serbia	19 December 2007	19 August 2008	5	0	2	3	4	8	−4	0.00	
Mouscron	11 June 2009	31 October 2009	14	2	5	7	14	22	−8	14.29	
Hércules	24 March 2011	23 June 2011	9	2	3	4	11	13	−2	22.22	
Valladolid	6 July 2011	5 June 2013	88	38	25	25	131	103	+28	43.18	
Valencia	5 June 2013	16 December 2013	23	10	4	9	33	33	+0	43.48	
Córdoba	20 October 2014	16 March 2015	21	3	6	12	15	32	−17	14.29	
Al Shabab	23 January 2017	16 May 2017	12	7	2	3	21	17	+4	58.33	
Partizan	5 June 2017	3 August 2018	63	36	15	12	112	57	+55	57.14	
Sporting Gijón	22 December 2019	21 July 2020	21	8	5	8	20	17	+3	38.10	
Total			307	140	73	94	465	346	+119	45.60	—

== Honours ==
=== Player ===
Deportivo

- Copa del Rey: 1994–95
- Supercopa de España: 1995

Valencia

- La Liga: 2001–02
- Copa del Rey: 1998–99
- Supercopa de España: 1999
- UEFA Intertoto Cup: 1998
- UEFA Champions League runner-up: 1999–2000, 2000–01

=== Manager ===
Serbia U21

- UEFA European Under-21 Championship runner-up: 2007

Valladolid

- Segunda División play-offs: 2012

Partizan

- Serbian Cup: 2017–18

Individual

- Serbian Coach of the Year: 2007
