= Mauro Silva =

Brazilian footballer

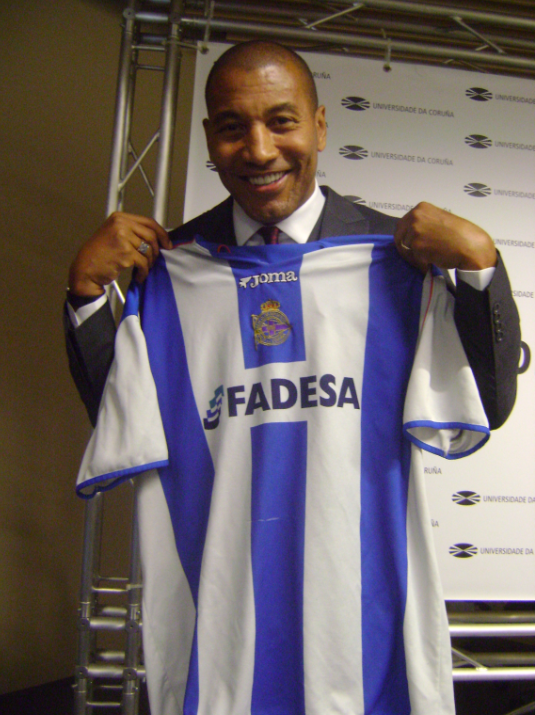
- Silva in 2022

Personal information
- Full name: Mauro da Silva Gomes
- Date of birth: 12 January 1968 (age 58)
- Place of birth: São Bernardo do Campo, Brazil
- Height: 1.77 m (5 ft 10 in)
- Position: Defensive midfielder

Senior career*
Years	Team	Apps	(Gls)
1987–1989	Guarani	1	(0)
1990–1992	Bragantino	61	(0)
1992–2005	Deportivo La Coruña	369	(1)
Total		431	(1)

International career
1991–2001	Brazil	59	(0)
Medal record
Men's Football
Representing Brazil
FIFA World Cup
Winner	1994
Copa América
Winner	1997 Bolivia
Runner-up	1991 Chile
CONCACAF Gold Cup
Third place	1998 USA
- * Club domestic league appearances and goals

Mauro da Silva Gomes (Brazilian Portuguese: [ˈmawɾu ˈsiwvɐ]; born 12 January 1968), known as Mauro Silva, is a Brazilian former professional footballer who played as a defensive midfielder. Regarded as one of the foremost players in his position during the 1990s, he was known for his stamina, physical strength, tackling, positional awareness and leadership, as well as his ability to regain possession and provide balance for more attack-minded teammates.

Silva spent the majority of his career with Deportivo, joining the Spanish club in 1992 and becoming a central figure in the side commonly known as Super Dépor. During his 13 seasons in La Liga, he helped establish Deportivo among the leading clubs in Spanish football, making 458 competitive appearances and scoring one goal. He won six major honours with the club, including the 1999–2000 La Liga title, and retired there in 2005.

At international level, Silva earned 59 caps for the Brazil national team. He formed a strong defensive midfield partnership with Dunga during Brazil's victorious 1994 FIFA World Cup campaign, providing the tactical balance behind the team's more creative attacking players. He also appeared in two editions of the Copa América, winning the tournament in 1997.

== Club career ==
Silva was born in São Bernardo do Campo, São Paulo. After starting playing with Guarani he moved to Bragantino in 1990, where he spent the following two seasons. Subsequently, he was acquired by Spain's Deportivo La Coruña, for 250 million pesetas (approximately €1.6 million), arriving at the same time as countryman Bebeto.

Silva was an everpresent fixture with the Galicians, only suspensions and injuries preventing him from being cast into the starting XI – in the 1994–95 campaign he only appeared in six La Liga matches and, already 36, was limited to 20 in his final year – as he helped them to one league, two cups and three supercups, adding to this the team's five participations in the UEFA Champions League, reaching the semi-finals in 2003–04: after a 0–0 away draw against Porto he missed the second leg due to suspension, and Depor lost 1–0.

On 22 May 2005, after 13 years with Deportivo, Silva was replaced by longtime understudy Aldo Duscher during a 3–0 home loss against Mallorca, bidding farewell to the Estadio Riazor and football in the same match as another club legend, Fran.

== International career ==
With Brazil, Silva collected 59 caps over ten years, making his debut in 1991; that same year, he was part of the team that finished in second place behind rivals Argentina at the 1991 Copa América in Chile. He played in every match and minute (except for the second half of the group stage match against Sweden) in his nation's victorious campaign at the 1994 FIFA World Cup; in the same year, he was named by FIFA as the ninth best player in the world. According to the organisation, the lack of attacking play in the final of the tournament against Italy was in part down to strong holding midfield play by Dino Baggio for Italy, and Dunga and Mauro Silva for Brazil; following a 0–0 draw after extra-time, Brazil won the match in a penalty shoot-out. He was also a member of the team that won the 1997 Copa América, making a substitute appearance in Brazil's 3–1 victory over hosts Bolivia in the final.

== Style of play ==
A consistent, disciplined and hard-working central or defensive midfielder, Mauro Silva was known particularly for his stamina, ability to regain possession, intercept passes and distribute the ball accurately to his teammates, rather than for his flair or creativity. His positional awareness, tactical intelligence, tackling, physical strength and effective use of his body enabled him to shield the ball, win contested challenges and break up opposing attacks. Although he was not a specialist playmaker, he generally kept possession moving through simple and efficient passing. He also provided balance for his more attack-minded teammates, most notably by forming a strong defensive midfield partnership with Dunga during Brazil's victorious 1994 FIFA World Cup campaign.

Silva received considerable recognition for his leadership throughout his career, and was regarded by pundits as one of the foremost defensive midfielders of his era. Brazilian newspaper Folha de S.Paulo described him as one of the most important defensive midfielders of his generation, while El País characterised him as a "global midfielder" capable of combining the best qualities of the Brazilian and European schools of football. Diario AS similarly called him a historic reference in the defensive midfield position. Spanish football journalist Julio Maldonado regarded Silva as the most complete holding midfielder he had watched, highlighting his positioning, tactical awareness and power. Santiago Segurola also placed him within a small group of exceptional ball-winners alongside Sergio Busquets, Claude Makélélé and Franco Baresi. In November 2016, ahead of Deportivo's 110th anniversary, Silva received the most votes in a club-organised fan poll to select the most emblematic players in its history.

== Career statistics ==
=== Club ===
Appearances and goals by club, season and competition
Club	Season	League		
Club	Season	Division	Apps	Goals
Guarani	1987	Série A	0	0
Guarani	1988	Série A	1	0
Guarani	1989	Série A	0	0
Guarani	Total		1	0
Bragantino	1990	Série A	18	0
Bragantino	1991	Série A	21	0
Bragantino	1992	Série A	22	0
Bragantino	Total		61	0
Deportivo	1992–93	La Liga	37	0
Deportivo	1993–94	La Liga	35	1
Deportivo	1994–95	La Liga	6	0
Deportivo	1995–96	La Liga	22	0
Deportivo	1996–97	La Liga	32	0
Deportivo	1997–98	La Liga	31	0
Deportivo	1998–99	La Liga	36	0
Deportivo	1999–2000	La Liga	33	0
Deportivo	2000–01	La Liga	31	0
Deportivo	2001–02	La Liga	27	0
Deportivo	2002–03	La Liga	32	0
Deportivo	2003–04	La Liga	27	0
Deportivo	2004–05	La Liga	20	0
Deportivo	Total		369	1
Career total			431	1

=== International ===
Appearances and goals by national team and year
National team	Year	Apps	Goals
Brazil	1991	13	0
Brazil	1992	7	0
Brazil	1993	11	0
Brazil	1994	11	0
Brazil	1995	1	0
Brazil	1996	1	0
Brazil	1997	10	0
Brazil	1998	4	0
Brazil	1999	0	0
Brazil	2000	0	0
Brazil	2001	1	0
Total		59	0

== Honours ==
Bragantino

- Campeonato Paulista: 1990

Deportivo

- La Liga: 1999–2000
- Copa del Rey: 1994–95, 2001–02
- Supercopa de España: 1995, 2000, 2002

Brazil

- FIFA World Cup: 1994
- Copa América: 1997; runner-up 1991
- CONCACAF Gold Cup: third place 1998

Individual

- Bola de Ouro: 1991
- Bola de Prata: 1991, 1992
- World Soccer World XI: 1992
- La Liga Team of The Year: 1993
