= Javier Manjarín =

Spanish footballer (born 1969)

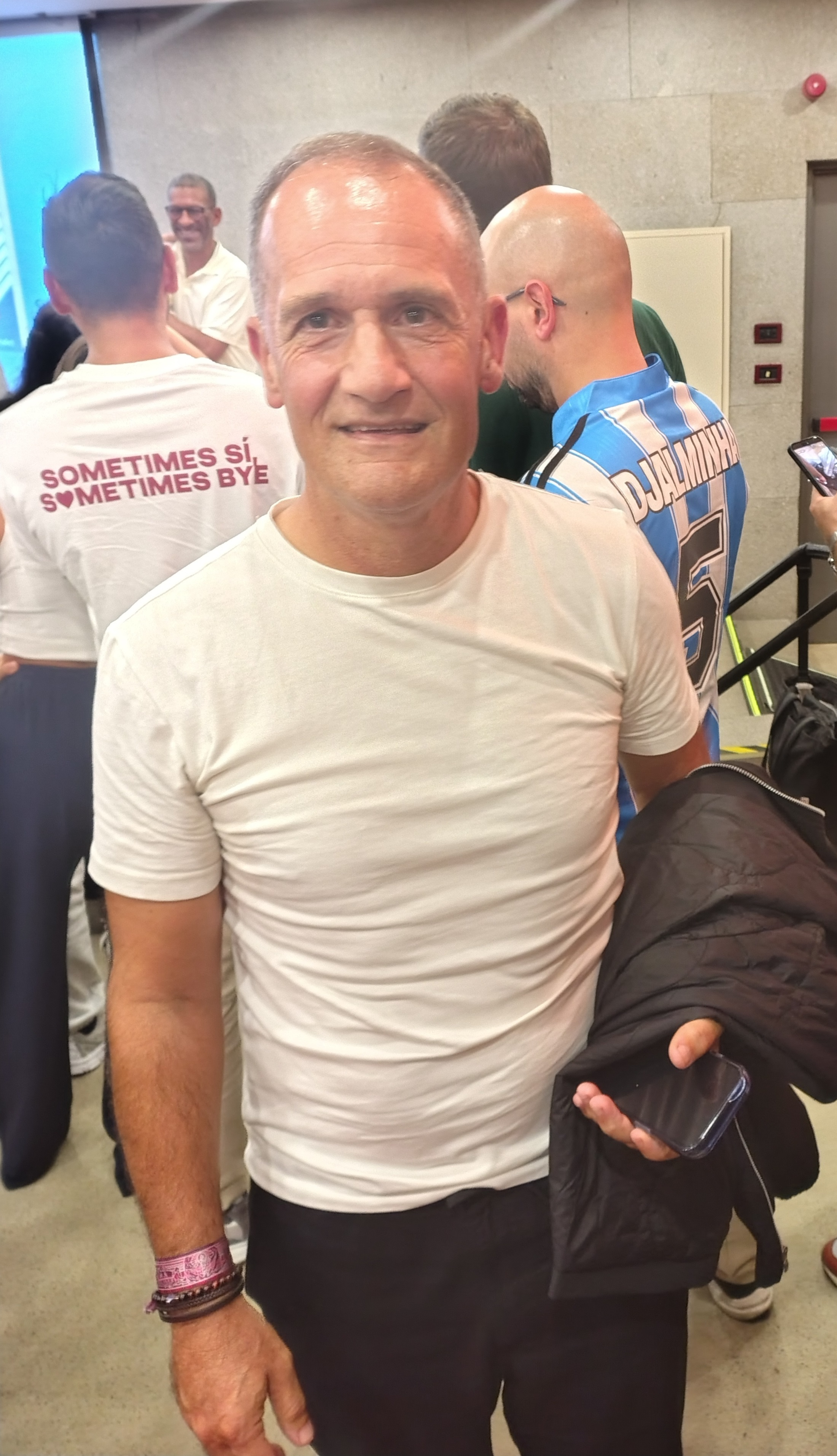
- Manjarín in 2016

Personal information
- Full name: Javier Manjarín Pereda
- Date of birth: 31 December 1969 (age 56)
- Place of birth: Gijón, Spain
- Height: 1.73 m (5 ft 8 in)
- Position: Forward

Youth career
- 1978–1984: Colegio Inmaculada
- 1984–1988: Sporting Gijón

Senior career*
Years	Team	Apps	(Gls)
1987–1989	Sporting Gijón B	67	(20)
1989–1993	Sporting Gijón	115	(16)
1993–1999	Deportivo La Coruña	153	(19)
1999–2001	Racing Santander	61	(3)
2001–2002	Celaya	32	(3)
2002–2003	Santos Laguna	30	(3)
2004–2005	Atlético Arteixo	15	(0)
Total		473	(64)

International career
1990	Spain U20	1	(0)
1990–1992	Spain U21	5	(3)
1991–1992	Spain U23	4	(0)
1995–1997	Spain	13	(2)
2000	Asturias	1	(0)

Managerial career
- 2016–2017: Deportivo B (assistant)
- 2017–2018: Deportivo La Coruña (assistant)
- 2018–2019: Alcorcón (assistant)
- 2019–2020: Racing Santander (assistant)
- 2021–2025: Racing Ferrol (assistant)
- 2025–2026: Gimnàstic (assistant)
- * Club domestic league appearances and goals

Olympic medal record

Representing Spain

Men's Football
Gold medal – first place	1992 Barcelona	Team competition

Javier Manjarín Pereda (born 31 December 1969) is a Spanish former professional footballer who played as a forward.

In a 17-year senior career, with speed as his main attribute, he played mainly for Sporting de Gijón (four seasons) and Deportivo de La Coruña (six), also competing in Mexico in his later years.

A Spain international in the mid-to-late 90s, Manjarín represented the country at Euro 1996.

== Club career ==
Born in Gijón, Asturias, Manjarín began playing professionally for local Sporting de Gijón, first appearing with his hometown squad during the 1989–90 campaign (29 games and four goals). He made a name for himself in La Liga with Deportivo de La Coruña after signing in summer 1993 for 215 million pesetas, being a key attacking unit in two runner-up and one third league places in his first four seasons while scoring 19 times.

On 3 November 1993, Manjarín scored in a 1–0 away win against Aston Villa in the second round of the UEFA Cup, qualifying his team 2–1 on aggregate. On 27 August 1995, he equalised an eventual 2–1 victory at Real Madrid in the second leg of the Supercopa de España (5–1 in total).

Heavily utilised by managers Arsenio Iglesias and John Toshack, Manjarín featured rarely under Carlos Alberto Silva and Javier Irureta, and this prompted a move to Racing de Santander where he somehow resurfaced, even though he suffered relegation to Segunda División at the end of 2000–01. Two years later, he went to Mexico to compete in the Liga MX with Celaya FC; the following season, he remained in the country with Club Santos Laguna.

Manjarín retired in 2005 at the age of 35, after one year in the Spanish Segunda División B with Atlético Arteixo. In the country's top division alone, he totalled 329 matches and 38 goals.

Subsequently, Manjarín was assistant manager to Cristóbal Parralo at Deportivo, AD Alcorcón, Santander and Racing de Ferrol.

== International career ==
Manjarín earned 13 caps for Spain in two years, netting twice and participating at UEFA Euro 1996. His debut came on 6 September 1995, as the national side crushed Cyprus 6–0 in Granada in that competition's qualifying stage; in the final tournament in England, he opened a 2–1 win over Romania in the last group fixture. In the quarter-finals, he missed an open chance to beat England's David Seaman early on, in an eventual penalty shoot-out loss.

Previously, Manjarín appeared with the under-23s at the 1992 Summer Olympics, winning gold. He did not play one single minute, however, having contracted an injury shortly before the start of the competition.

=== International goals ===
Scores and results list Spain's goal tally first, score column indicates score after each Manjarín goal.

List of international goals scored by Javier Manjarín
No.	Date	Venue	Opponent	Score	Result	Competition
1	15 November 1995	Martínez Valero, Elche, Spain	North Macedonia	2–0	3–0	Euro 1996 qualifying
2	18 June 1996	Elland Road, Leeds, England	Romania	1–0	2–1	Euro 1996

== Honours ==
Deportivo

- Copa del Rey: 1994–95
- Supercopa de España: 1995

Spain U23

- Summer Olympic Games: 1992
