= 1994–95 Copa del Rey =

93rd Copa del Rey

Tournament details
- Country: Spain
- Teams: 113

Final positions
- Champions: Deportivo de La Coruña
- Runner-up: Valencia CF

Tournament statistics
- Matches played: 149
- Goals scored: 390 (2.62 per match)
- Top goal scorer(s): Luboslav Penev (7)

The 1994–95 Copa del Rey was the 93rd staging of the Copa del Rey.

The competition started on 28 September 1994 and concluded on 27 June 1995 with the Final, held at the Estadio Santiago Bernabéu in Madrid.

== Fourth round ==
Fourth round
Home 1st leg	Agg.	Home 2nd leg	1st leg			2nd leg			Notes
UD Las Palmas	0–2	Atlético de Madrid	25 January 1995	0–0	Rep.	1 February 1995	2–0	Rep.	
CD Leganés	1–3	CD Badajoz	25 January 1995	0–2	Rep.	1 February 1995	1–1	Rep.	
UE Lleida	3–1	SD Compostela	25 January 1995	2–0	Rep.	1 February 1995	1–1	Rep.	
RCD Mallorca	2–1	Celta de Vigo	25 January 1995	2–1	Rep.	1 February 1995	0–0	Rep.	
Palamós CF	2–1	Villarreal CF	25 January 1995	2–1	Rep.	1 February 1995	0–0	Rep.	
Rayo Vallecano	2–2 (a)	Racing de Santander	25 January 1995	0–1	Rep.	1 February 1995	1–2	Rep.	
UD Salamanca	2–4	Valencia CF	25 January 1995	2–1	Rep.	1 February 1995	3–0	Rep.	
Sestao SC	1–3	Albacete Balompié	25 January 1995	1–2	Rep.	1 February 1995	1–0	Rep.	
Sevilla FC	3–4	Sporting de Gijón	25 January 1995	2–1	Rep.	1 February 1995	3–1	Rep.	
CD Toledo	3–2	Real Valladolid CF	25 January 1995	3–0	Rep.	1 February 1995	2–0	Rep.	
Real Sociedad	1–4	Real Betis	26 January 1995	0–1	Rep.	2 February 1995	3–1	Rep.	

== Bracket ==
First round
1	(Asturias) Sporting de Gijón	1	3	4
16	(Extremadura) CD Badajoz	1	0	1
8	(Catalonia) Palamós CF	0	1	1
9	(Community of Madrid) Rayo Vallecano	1	1	2
5	(Catalonia) UE Lleida	0	1	1
12	(Galicia (Spain)) Deportivo de La Coruña	3	4	7
4	(Basque Country (autonomous community)) Athletic Bilbao	4	0	4
13	(Andalusia) Real Betis	0	1	1
6	(Castilla–La Mancha) CD Toledo	1	0	1
11	(Balearic Islands) RCD Mallorca	1	2	3
3	(Community of Madrid) Real Madrid CF	1	1	2
14	(Valencian Community) Valencia CF	2	2	4
7	(Catalonia) FC Barcelona	1	3	4
10	(Community of Madrid) Atlético de Madrid	4	1	5
2	(Castilla–La Mancha) Albacete Balompié	2	1	3
15	(Aragon) Real Zaragoza	1	1	2

Quarter-finals
(Asturias) Sporting de Gijón	1	1	2
(Community of Madrid) Rayo Vallecano	1	0	1
(Galicia (Spain)) Deportivo de La Coruña	3	0	3
(Basque Country (autonomous community)) Athletic Bilbao	0	0	0
(Balearic Islands) RCD Mallorca	1	0	1
(Valencian Community) Valencia CF	0	4	4
(Community of Madrid) Atlético de Madrid	1	0	1
(Castilla–La Mancha) Albacete Balompié	1	1	2

Semi-finals
(Asturias) Sporting de Gijón	0	1	1
(Galicia (Spain)) Deportivo de La Coruña	2	0	2
(Valencian Community) Valencia CF	1	2	3
(Castilla–La Mancha) Albacete Balompié	1	1	2

Final
(Galicia (Spain)) Deportivo de La Coruña	2
(Valencian Community) Valencia CF	1

== Round of 16 ==
Team 1	Agg.	Team 2	1st leg	2nd leg
Sporting de Gijón (Asturias)	4–1	(Extremadura) CD Badajoz	1–1	3-0
Palamós CF (Catalonia)	1–2	(Community of Madrid) Rayo Vallecano	0–1	1–1
UE Lleida (Catalonia)	1–7	(Galicia (Spain)) Deportivo de La Coruña	0–3	1-4
Athletic Bilbao (Basque Country (autonomous community))	4–1	(Andalusia) Real Betis	4–0	0-1
CD Toledo (Castilla–La Mancha)	1–3	(Aragon) RCD Mallorca	1–1	0-2
Real Madrid CF (Community of Madrid)	2–4	(Valencian Community) Valencia CF	1–2	1-2
FC Barcelona (Catalonia)	4–5	(Community of Madrid) Atlético de Madrid	1–4	3-1
Albacete Balompié (Castilla–La Mancha)	3–2	(Aragon) Real Zaragoza	2–1	1–1

=== First leg ===
7 February 1995	FC Barcelona	1–4	Atlético de Madrid	Barcelona
21:30 CET	Abelardo 1'	Report (in Spanish)	Simeone 15' (pen.); Valencia 53', 89'; Pirri Mori 68'	Stadium: Camp Nou; Attendance: 60,000; Referee: Díaz Vega (Asturias)

8 February 1995	Athletic Bilbao	4–0	Real Betis	Bilbao
20:15 CET	Guerrero 23'; Ziganda 25', 34', 63'	Report (in Spanish)		Stadium: San Mamés; Attendance: 40,000; Referee: Daudén Ibáñez (Aragon)

8 February 1995	Sporting de Gijón	1–1	CD Badajoz	Gijón
20:30 CET	Raúl 27'	Report (in Spanish)	Altimira 28'	Stadium: El Molinón; Attendance: 9,200; Referee: Andradas Asurmendi (Navarre)

8 February 1995	Palamós CF	0–1	Rayo Vallecano	Palamós
20:45 CET		Report (in Spanish)	Michel 16'	Stadium: Nou Municipal de Palamós; Attendance: 1,500; Referee: López de la Fuente (Galicia (Spain))

8 February 1995	Albacete Balompié	2–1	Real Zaragoza	Albacete
21:00 CET	Morientes 60'; Fonseca 79'	Report (in Spanish)	Óscar 81'	Stadium: Carlos Belmonte; Attendance: — Referee: Esquinas Torres (Community of Madrid)

8 February 1995	UE Lleida	0–3	Deportivo de La Coruña	Lleida
21:00 CET		Report (in Spanish)	Claudio 20'; Donato 54' (pen.); Bebeto 90'	Stadium: Camp d'Esports; Attendance: 10,000; Referee: Ansuátegui Roca (Valencian Community)

8 February 1995	CD Toledo	1–1	RCD Mallorca	Toledo
21:00 CET	De Diego 70'	Report (in Spanish)	Limperger 68'	Stadium: El Salto del Caballo; Attendance: 5,800; Referee: Mejuto González (Asturias)

9 February 1995	Real Madrid CF	1–2	Valencia CF	Madrid
21:30 CET	Raúl 11'	Report (in Spanish)	Salenko 27', 55'	Stadium: Santiago Bernabéu; Attendance: 70,000; Referee: Martin Navarrete (Andalusia)

=== Second leg ===
14 February 1995	Atlético de Madrid	1–3	FC Barcelona	Madrid
21:30 CET	Caminero 45'	Report (in Spanish)	Hagi 8'; Stoichkov 49' (pen.), 57' (pen.)	Stadium: Vicente Calderón; Attendance: 55,000; Referee: Daudén Ibáñez (Aragon)

15 February 1995	Real Zaragoza	1–1	Albacete Balompié	Zaragoza
20:15 CET	Esnáider 86'	Report (in Spanish)	Morientes 50'	Stadium: La Romareda; Attendance: 20,000; Referee: Pajares Paz (Extremadura)

15 February 1995	Rayo Vallecano	1–1	Palamós CF	Vallecas, Madrid
21:00 CET	Višnjić 1'	Report (in Spanish)	Alex García 76'	Stadium: Teresa Rivero; Attendance: — Referee: Puentes Leira (Galicia (Spain))

15 February 1995	Deportivo de La Coruña	4–1	UE Lleida	A Coruña
21:00 CET	Julio Salinas 13', 34', 63'; Đukić 73'	Report (in Spanish)	Pineda 28'	Stadium: Riazor; Attendance: — Referee: Brito Arceo (Canary Islands)

15 February 1995	RCD Mallorca	2–0	CD Toledo	Palma de Mallorca
21:00 CET	Soler 84'; Ángel Luis 87' (pen.)	Report (in Spanish)		Stadium: Lluís Sitjar; Attendance: 5,338; Referee: Japón Sevilla (Andalusia)

15 February 1995	CD Badajoz	0–3	Sporting de Gijón	Badajoz
21:00 CET		Report (in Spanish)	Pier 73', 90+1'; Lediakhov 80'	Stadium: El Vivero; Attendance: — Referee: Fernández Marín (Valencian Community)

15 February 1995	Real Betis	1–0	Athletic Bilbao	Sevilla
21:15 CET	Kowalczyk 46'	Report (in Spanish)		Stadium: Benito Villamarín; Attendance: 20,000; Referee: Panadero Martinez (Castile and León)

16 February 1995	Valencia CF	2–1	Real Madrid CF	Valencia
21:30 CET	Mijatović 87'; Fernando 90+3'	Report (in Spanish)	Laudrup 10'	Stadium: Mestalla; Attendance: — Referee: López Nieto (Andalusia)

== Quarter-finals ==
Team 1	Agg.	Team 2	1st leg	2nd leg
Sporting de Gijón (Asturias)	2–1	(Community of Madrid) Rayo Vallecano	1–1	1-0
Deportivo de La Coruña (Galicia (Spain))	3–0	(Basque Country (autonomous community)) Athletic Bilbao	3–0	0–0
RCD Mallorca (Balearic Islands)	1–4	(Valencian Community) Valencia CF	1–0	0-4
Atlético de Madrid (Community of Madrid)	1–2	(Castilla–La Mancha) Albacete Balompié	1–1	0-1

=== First leg ===
7 March 1995	Atlético de Madrid	1–1	Albacete Balompié	Madrid
21:30 CET	Rocha 19'	Report (in Spanish)	Antonio 75'	Stadium: Vicente Calderón; Attendance: 20,000; Referee: Barrenechea Montero (Castile and León)

8 March 1995	Sporting de Gijón	1–1	Rayo Vallecano	Gijón
20:30 CET	Morales 4'	Report (in Spanish)	Gustavo 33'	Stadium: El Molinón; Attendance: 12,000; Referee: Rubio Valdivieso (Castile and León)

8 March 1995	RCD Mallorca	1–0	Valencia CF	Palma de Mallorca
21:15 CET	Milojevic 65'	Report (in Spanish)		Stadium: Lluís Sitjar; Attendance: 21,800; Referee: José María García-Aranda (Community of Madrid)

9 March 1995	Deportivo de La Coruña	3–0	Athletic Bilbao	A Coruña
21:30 CET	Bebeto 31'; Donato 62'; Manjarín 89'	Report (in Spanish)		Stadium: Riazor; Attendance: 15,000; Referee: Fernández Marín (Valencian Community)

=== Second leg ===
21 March 1995	Athletic Bilbao	0–0	Deportivo de La Coruña	Bilbao
21:30 CET		Report (in Spanish)		Stadium: San Mamés; Attendance: — Referee: Antonio Jesús López Nieto (Andalusia)

22 March 1995	Rayo Vallecano	0–1	Sporting de Gijón	Vallecas, Madrid
21:00 CET		Report (in Spanish)	Raúl 68'	Stadium: Teresa Rivero; Attendance: — Referee: Ansuátegui Roca (Valencian Community)

22 March 1995	Valencia CF	4–0	RCD Mallorca	Valencia
21:15 CET	Mijatović 4'; Penev 40', 86'; Fernando 55'	Report (in Spanish)		Stadium: Mestalla; Attendance: 44,000; Referee: Arturo Daudén Ibáñez (Aragon)

23 March 1995	Albacete Balompié	1–0	Atlético de Madrid	Albacete
21:30 CET	Bjelica 87'	Report (in Spanish)		Stadium: Carlos Belmonte; Attendance: — Referee: Brito Arceo (Canary Islands)

== Semi-finals ==
Team 1	Agg.	Team 2	1st leg	2nd leg
Sporting de Gijón (Asturias)	1–2	(Galicia (Spain)) Deportivo de La Coruña	0–2	1-0
Valencia CF (Valencian Community)	3–2	(Castilla–La Mancha) Albacete Balompié	1–1	2-1

=== First leg ===
30 May 1995	Sporting de Gijón	0–2	Deportivo de La Coruña	Gijón
21:30 CET		Report (in Spanish)	Manjarín 20'; Julio Salinas 54'	Stadium: El Molinón; Attendance: — Referee: Fernández Marín (Valencian Community)

31 May 1995	Valencia CF	1–1	Albacete Balompié	Valencia
21:30 CET	Penev 46' (pen.)	Report (in Spanish)	Sala 24'	Stadium: Mestalla; Attendance: 41,000; Referee: Rubio Valdivieso (Castile and León)

=== Second leg ===
13 June 1995	Albacete Balompié	1–2	Valencia CF	Albacete
21:30 CET	Dertycia 79'	Report (in Spanish)	Roberto 28'; Penev 72'	Stadium: Carlos Belmonte; Attendance: 17,100; Referee: Díaz Vega (Asturias)

14 June 1995	Deportivo de La Coruña	0–1	Sporting de Gijón	A Coruña
21:30 CET		Report (in Spanish)	Lediakhov 11'	Stadium: Riazor; Attendance: — Referee: Gracia Redondo (Aragon)

== Final ==
24 June 1995
21:00 CET

Deportivo de La Coruña	1–1 (suspended)	Valencia CF
Manjarín 35'	Report (in Spanish)	Mijatović 70'

Madrid
Stadium: Santigo Bernabéu
Attendance: 95,000
Referee: García-Aranda (Community of Madrid)
Suspended due to heavy rain and hail after 79 minutes

Resumed

27 June 1995
20:30 CET

Deportivo de La Coruña	2–1	Valencia CF
Manjarín 35'; Alfredo 81'	Report (in Spanish)	Mijatović 70'

Madrid
Stadium: Santigo Bernabéu
Attendance: 81,000
Referee: García-Aranda (Community of Madrid)

Copa del Rey
1994–95 winners
Deportivo de La Coruña
1st title

== Top goalscorers ==
Player	Goals	Team
(Bulgaria) Lyuboslav Penev	7	Valencia CF
(Spain) Enric Cuxart	6	Cartagena FC
(Spain) Vicente Borge	6	CD Lugo
(Spain) Antonio Puche	5	Palamós CF
(Russia) Igor Lediakhov	5	Sporting de Gijón
(Spain) Aureli Altimira	5	CD Badajoz
(Spain) Joseba Irazusta	5	SD Beasain
(Spain) Fernando Gómez	4	Valencia CF
(Spain) Manolo Peña	4	CF Extremadura
(Spain) Miguel Ángel	4	CD Leganés
