= History of Deportivo de A Coruña =

History of Spanish association football team

Deportivo de A Coruña is a Spanish association football team.

== History ==
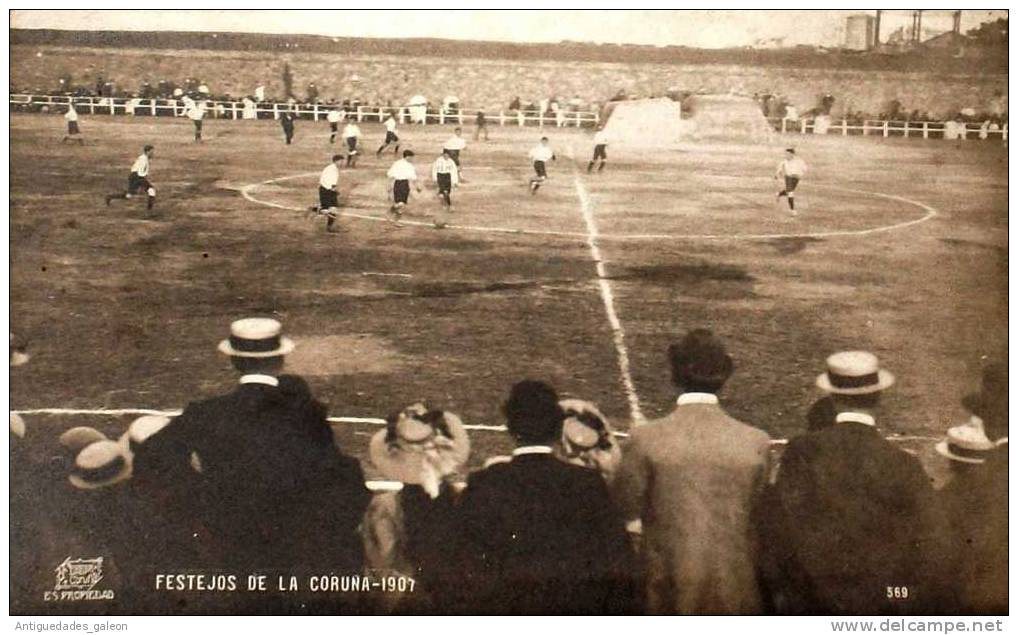
Football match in the old Corralón da gaiteira

Unlike what happened in most of the Iberian Peninsula, football did not reach the city of A Coruña through the English, instead, it was introduced by José María Abalo, a youngster who had returned to his hometown after studying in England. The game gained rapid popularity and several teams were formed on an informal basis. Abalo settled in Coruña, where he tried to make football known as a sport among the young people of the city, teaching football to the youth and organizing the first football matches in the region, most of which were between locals.

The sport began to take root in the city and kept growing to the point that in 1903, some young people from the Sala de armas Calvet, a gym that was then directed by the fencing champion Federico Calvet, began deserting it to follow Abalo in football practice.

Later that same year, Abalo's team changed its name to Foot-ball Corunna Club, which played on two sides and was distinguished by the color of the belt, white or red, on an entirely white uniform. The club later adopted a different one: a yellow and black striped shirt and white pants, with which the team appeared on 20 March 1904 at the albero of the Herculina Bullring in the Plaza de Toros in a match against a team known as Diligent, which was made up of members of the officers of two British steamships.

This was the first serious and proper football match in the city and it was surprisingly won 3–0 by the locals who, buoyed by their success, both sporting and social, continued to play meetings against the officers of the ships that docked at the Port of A Coruña. The popularity of football in La Coruña kept growing to the point that the Bullring soon became too small for this group of football pioneers, so they moved to the grounds of the so-called Corralón de la Gaiteira ("Piper's Yard") were soon enabled as a permanent football field, the first of such in La Coruña.

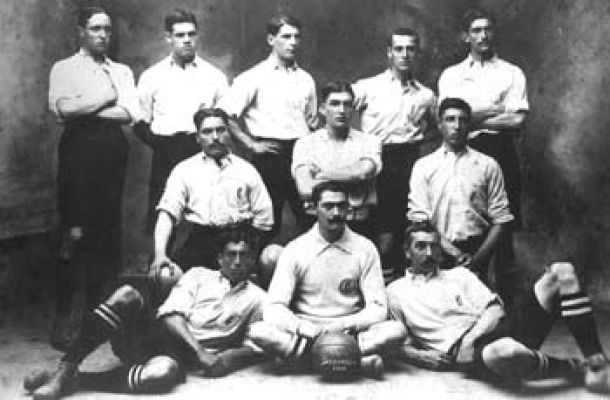
Deportivo Sala Calvet in 1908

The members of the Sala Calvet who had participated in the constitution of Corunna FC and the recently created Club Naútico followed Abalo's example and recruited a large group of players for the Calvet's gym, and thus Deportivo de la Sala Calvet was founded in 1906. Not without effort, since getting it started required a dispute between the rowing section and the football section to know which of the two was the most complete sport. It was settled in a match between the two at the Corralón de la Gaiteira and, as night fell without a goal having been scored, they decided to continue the match the next day, on 1 March 1906, which was won 1–0 by the Deportivistas. In December 1906, members of Sala Calvet gymnasium formed Deportivo de La Coruña, naming Luis Cornide as the first president. Records indicate that the team consisted of Salvador Fojón, Venancio Deus, Juan Long, Ángel Rodríguez, Manuel Álvarez, Daniel Aler, Paco Martínez, Félix de Paz, Virgilio Rodríguez, Juan Manuel López, and Martínez Urioste.

On 11 May 1907, civil governor Luis Moyano passed the proper statute and regulations on the formation of the club. One and a half years later, King Alfonso XIII of Spain conceded the mark of royalty to the club while he also accepted the role of honorary president of the now-called Real Club Deportivo de La Coruña. At the same time, Deportivo's first home pitch at Corralón de la Gaiteira would become obsolete, and they moved to a stadium now called Viejo Riazor.

=== The first decades ===
Because of the success of the Spain national team at the 1920 Antwerp Summer Olympics, football exploded throughout Spain. This eventually led to the establishment of a national tournament which would end the regional championships. This form had existed throughout the country's numerous provinces.

With football becoming part of the city, Deportivo began to take part in many friendly exhibitions within and out of Galicia until 1928, when the "Liga" was born. However, Depor failed to qualify for the Primera División season 1928/1929. Instead they started playing in the Segunda División, where they eventually finished eighth in a division consisting of ten clubs. The other nine were Alavés, Sevilla, Celta, Valencia, Betis, Iberia, Oviedo, Gijón, and Rácing de Madrid.

In 1932, while still playing in the second division, Deportivo managed to eliminate Real Madrid from the Copa del Rey tournament. This was a big achievement because the club from the capital became Liga champions that season. For Deportivo this was only a hint of better things to come.

=== 1941-1945: First period in the Primera División ===
In a year when the Second World War was going on in the rest of Europe and the world, and Francisco Franco was dictator in Spain, Deportivo finally managed to achieve promotion to the Primera División for the first time in its history. It took place after the season 1940/1941 when Murcia was defeated 2–1 in a match for promotion. The legendary Deportivo team of that day consisted of Acuña, Novo, Pedrito, Muntané, Molaza, Reboredo, Breijo, Guimerans, Elícegui, Chacho, and Chao.

They were led by coach Hilario Marrero and each player earned 2,000 pesetas (not even €20) each for this achievement. This amount even had to be collected through public donations or other subscriptions because of the weak economic state of the club at that time.

The team finished fourth in the first year at the highest level (1941/1942), and there was a decision to build a new home. 1944 was the year of the inauguration of the new Riazor, but the team encountered problems playing football at the highest level. This led to the first ever relegation from the Primera División in 1945.

=== 1950: Close to first title ===
The team went up, down, and up again until they reached their best achievement in the first 44 years of existence: second place in the season 1949/1950. Back then Chaver Gómez was president of the club and Scopelli was coach. Deportivo lost the Spanish title to Atlético de Madrid after the Galicians only were able to take one point from Atlético de Bilbao in the San Mamés Stadium on the final day of the season.

In those years the club was expanding to an "overseas" level as the team incorporated two Argentine players: Corcuera and Oswaldo. They would become part of an attacking line consisting of them and Franco, Moll, and Tino; four South American players and one "Coruñés" and they became known as the Orquesta Canaro.

This attacking force achieved that Deportivo started their "Golden Decade" and stayed in the highest division until 1957. For the club this was a significant period, and personnel such as Argentine coach Helenio Herrera, Pahíño, and Spain's future European Footballer of the Year, Luis Suárez, were featured at the club in this decade.

=== 1962-1973: Ups and downs ===
Ups and Downs. Hopes and disillusionment. After their "Golden Decade", the club came into an uncertain period, despite the presence of some great players. From the forward line Orquesta Canaro to the quick-fleeing stay of Luis Suárez, Amancio, Reija, Veloso, and Jaime Blanco. All of whom were products of Deportivo's youth system at that time.

But the poor financial health of the club had as its consequence that they could not keep these jewels and most of them left to economically more powerful clubs. It caused the notorious period of "ups and downs" for the Galician club as they experienced relegation in 1963, 1965, 1967, 1970 and 1973. It was a time of being too good for the lower leagues but not capable of surviving in the Primera División. It was a good time though compared to what came after it.

=== 1973-1991: Troubles in the lower leagues ===
Deportivo encountered the most problematic years of its existence after the relegation in 1973. The club found itself trapped between the Segunda B División and even the Tercera División and the relegation from the highest level left a tremendous mark on the social and sporting reputation of the club. This was stressed even more due to the constant rise in debt of the already economically troubled club. Not even Luis Suárez, as coach of Deportivo during the season 1978/1979, could turn the tide.

The 1980s were a prolongation of the uncertainties and despair within La Coruña, and the everlasting obsession of returning to the Primera División grew each year. But after one disappointment after the other, the frustration grew as Deportivo saw themselves locked in the Segunda División.

They were even close to dropping one level when in May, 1988 a goal of Vicente in extra time in the last match of the season against Racing de Santander saved Deportivo from yet another step backwards and a possible end of the club, because of the economic difficulties. It had been a narrow escape, but Deportivo had just survived...

It was worth the pain and waiting as slowly the succession of dreadful events came to a halt. The administration of the club was completely restructured with the objective of healing it economically while finding a sense of sportive stability. In 1988, a historic assembly took place at the Colegio de Los Salesianos, where Augusto César Lendoiro was elected president of the club. Fans, players and the directing staff all came together to place Deportivo back to where it belonged: A club for all coruñeses.

But the situation of the club was not very encouraging back then. The debt had grown until 600 million pesetas (about €4 million) while the social "implantation" of the club was very weak. Simply put: there was no proper future installed nor prepared for the sportive aspect of the club. The number one priority of the directors was to remove the debts and to find economical assurance. There was a popular theme to this called "walk or explode", which later would be referred to as a "miracle" once the club was able to support itself again.

The season 1988/1989, the first under Lendoiro, began with local coach Arsenio Iglesias on the bench and with practically the same squad which barely had escaped relegation during the previous season. But the team, with the addition of Brazilian Raudnei, managed to complete a great Copa del Rey campaign yet once again failed to gain promotion to the Primera División. Nevertheless, for the first time in many years the club was able to deal with its financial difficulties and actually to reach a surplus in their balance.

With few new signings, and still wary of any possible monetary dangers to the club, the 1989/1990 season was somewhat of a turning point. The team was more motivated than ever and with the debut of players like Martin Lasarte and Sabín Bilbao, and with the eastern-bloc players Sredojevic, Batrovic and Stojanov, the Galician club managed to reach a preliminary two-leg encounter with Tenerife for a place at the highest level. But despite a draw in the first leg on the Canary Islands, the fans of Deportivo faced another disappointment as in the return leg in Riazor the island club obtained the ticket to the Primera División.

However, Deportivo president Lendoiro insisted that with everyone's support the club would finally ascend to the highest level. The financial management was in safe hands, a surplus in gains still existed and the number of club members (socios) continued to grow to 17,500. This was how the season 1990/1991 was approached. Josu, Albístegui, Stojadinovic, Kanatlarovski, Mújika, Villa, Albis, Uralde and later Djukic were some of the names added to the squad and the target was clear: reaching the Primera División.

Once again the dying seconds of the season would decide the fate of Deportivo. But after having missed 18 years of football in the Primera División, Deportivo defeated Murcia in play-off matches and finally achieved promotion. All of La Coruña and Galicia were soaked in joy and the blanquiazul world would then start to move beyond its borders, as fans all across the nation were to join the Deportivo cause.

=== 1991-1993: The Birth of 'Superdepor' ===
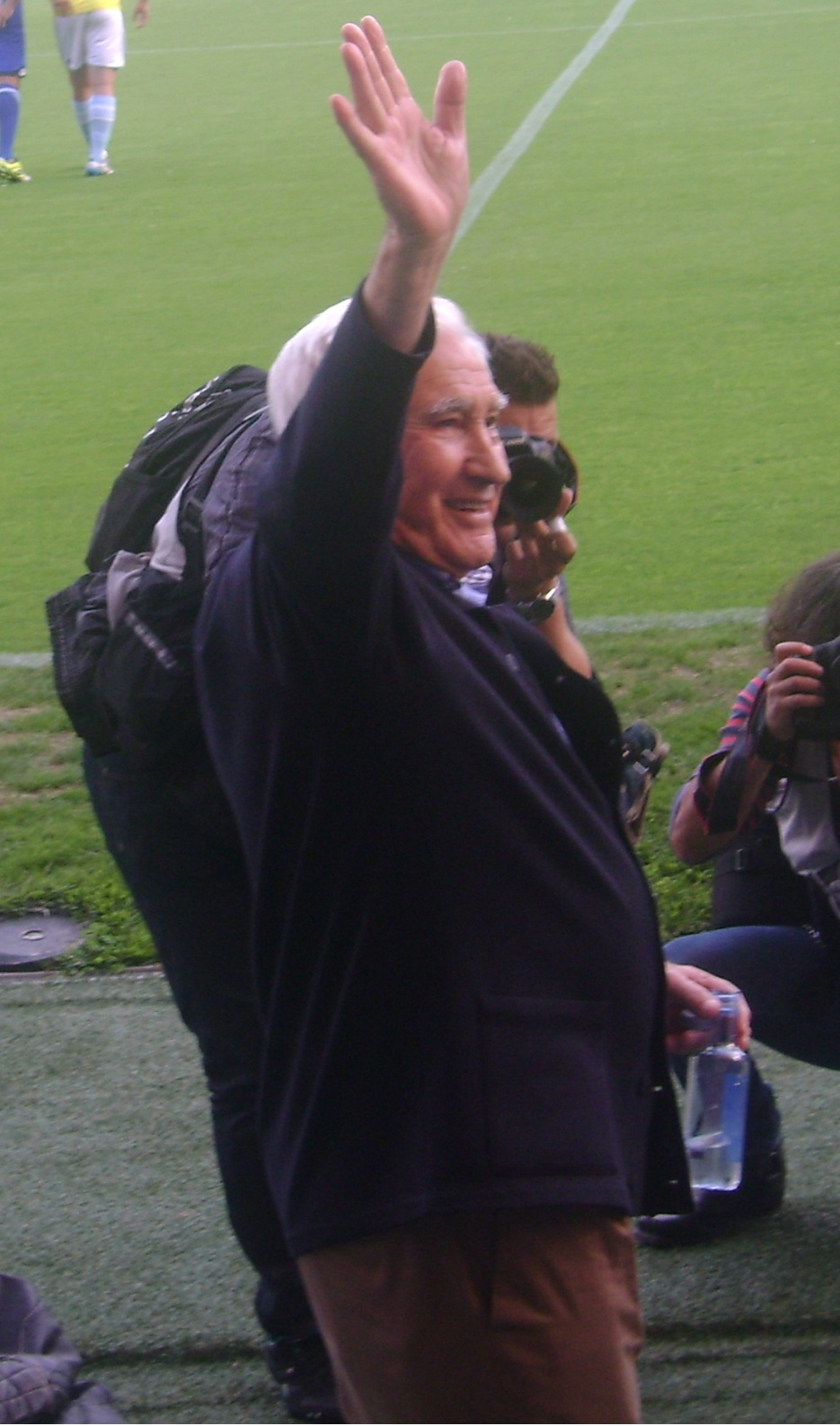
Arsenio Iglesias was the Súper Dépor coach.

==== 1991/1992: Survival at the final moment ====
The 1991/1992 season is often considered as one of transition. A mix of veterans and younger players with the likes of Claudio, Ribera, López-Rekarte, Canales, Liaño, Kirov and Kiriakov formed the team guided by coach Marco Antonio Boronat, and Deportivo looked on their way to safety after an impressive 5–2 win in March, 1992 against Sporting de Gijón with three goals by Uralde.

However, after a disappointing 2–2 home draw in April against Burgos after leading 2–0 at Riazor, relegation had come so close that Boronat was replaced by Arsenio Iglesias. In the end Deportivo were one point short of reaching a safe place and finishing as number seventeen in the Liga caused going through play-off matches for the third time in a row. In 1990 the club had missed promotion in these matches but in 1991 they finally achieved it. In 1992 the status of Primera División team was secured against Betis and this was celebrated by the fans of Deportivo as if the team had won the Liga.

The lineup most frequently used during that campaign was: Liaño - Sabin Bilbao, Albístegui, Djukic, Lasarte, López-Rekarte/Mariano Hoyas - Fran, Kanatlarovski, Kiriakov, José Ramón - Claudio.

==== 1992/1993: Deportivo surprise Spain ====
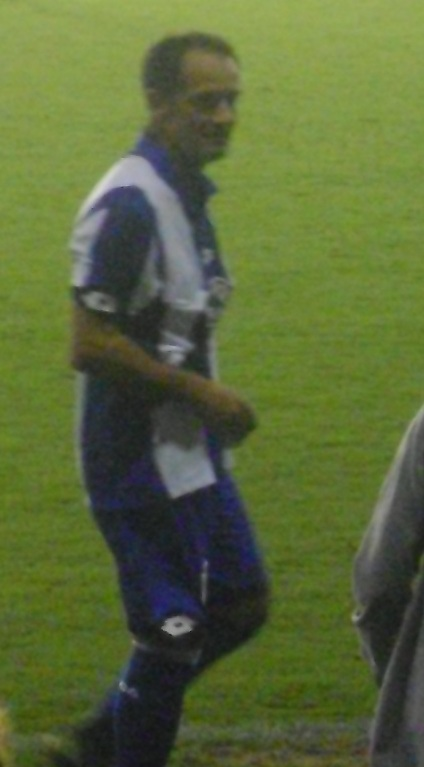
Javier Manjarín

When the 1992/1993 season started, Deportivo had become an "Anonymous Society" (Limited Company) (S.A.D.). This is a common factor for clubs in Spain, as each club is their own independent institution. Fans and shareholders got to own a part of the club and have their own say. This was truly a showing of the message: "a club for all coruñeses".

The consolidation of the team had as its consequence new important signings, as 1992 was the year when internationally recognized figures were introduced to Deportivo. Brazilian internationals Mauro Silva (24) and Bebeto (28) were the first to arrive. They were joined by Spanish players Aldana, Juanito, Nando, José Ramón and Serna. Lendoiro and his staff made it clear: Avoiding relegation was not the objective anymore. Deportivo were after more.

About 30,000 fans showed up at Riazor to witness the presentation for the new season, a campaign that would become historic. The foundations of SuperDepor were put in place and the echoes of "Madrid, Barcelona, here we are!" (words spoken by president Lendoiro after the promotion in 1991) were shouted by all deportivistas. The team won its first five matches, including a sensational 3–2 win against Real Madrid after trailing 0–2. Bebeto scored two goals in this match and continued scoring all season long. He finished the season with 29 goals scored, becoming the 1992-93 Pichichi Trophy winner.

The season 1993/1994 will for always be underlined in the history of the club. Not only for the first ever presence in a European tournament, but also for the dramatic loss of the Liga during the final seconds of the season.

The squad was reinforced with well recognized footballers like Donato, Manjarín, Paco, Elduayen, Voro, Pedro Riesco and Alfredo and everybody was just hoping that the previous campaign would be continued. This happened because early December the team conquered the first place in the Liga, had beaten Real Madrid 4–0, and were playing the third round of the UEFA Cup against Eintracht Frankfurt. The Germans proved to be too strong though after Deportivo had beaten Danish club Aalborg and taken their first scalp of a reputated club by eliminating Aston Villa F.C.

With Arsenio Iglesias still at the helm, the team now had the chance to focus on the Liga. And from 4 December on the team stayed on top of the Primera División. The goals of Bebeto and Claudio that season brought Deportivo to the final matchday as a serious title contender. A win at home against Valencia would have been enough, no matter what rivals Barcelona would do.

At half-time the score in Riazor was still 0-0 but Sevilla were leading 1–2 in Barcelona. The season would finish dramatically though as with twenty minutes to go, Barcelona striker Romario shot his club in front and now Deportivo were obliged to win themselves. In injury-time the team were rewarded a penalty-kick after defender Nando had been fouled. As Bebeto had missed one in the previous weeks and Donato had been taken off, defender Djukic stepped forward but missed the opportunity. Barcelona snatched the title away from Deportivo based on a superior goal average as both clubs were drawn on points.

Liaño won his second Trofeo Zamora that campaign as he only leaked 18 goals during the season. There were no serious rivals for him because the defences of Barcelona, Sevilla and Racing were closest with 42 goals. In fact, the seriousness of Deportivo at the back had been an important factor in their conquest with players like Nando, Djukic, Ribera, Voro and López-Rekarte. In 27 of the 38 Liga matches that campaign a clean sheet was held including the final six.

The players most frequently used that campaign were: Liaño - Nando, Voro, Djukic, Ribera, López-Rekarte - Fran, Mauro Silva, Donato - Bebeto, Claudio

=== 1994/1995: First ever trophy ===
The campaign after it, 1994/1995, would in fact become known for its consistency. In December 1994 the team occupied the second place in the Liga and only lost their first match on day eleven. In the UEFA Cup the team had kicked out Rosenborg (Norway) and Tirol Innsbruk (Austria) and now had to challenge Borussia Dortmund. A 1–0 home win, thanks to a Bebeto goal, was not enough though as a dramatic extra-time in Germany indicated the end of Deportivo in the tournament.

For the second time in a row the team could focus on the domestic competitions, including the Copa del Rey. But in March 1995 the team dropped down to fourth position in the Liga after a 0–1 home loss against Atlético de Madrid. Still, the team bounced back and stayed unbeaten in the next nine matches and approached leaders Real Madrid when the match between both teams arrived in the Bernabéu. Deportivo did well and a goal of Bebeto caused a 1–1 score near the end, but a final strike of Zamorano was enough to give the home team the title.

Deportivo achieved an honourable end to the season by scoring 13 goals in the final two matches (including a 2–8 win at Albacete) and finishing second. For the third time in their history the club qualified for European football and the Galicians had finished among the best three for a third consecutive time.

But it was time for a prize. The team had been close to winning two Ligas, and did well in Europe, but finally were crowned on 27 June 1995. It was the final of the Copa del Rey, which had to be postponed three days earlier because of heavy rain. On that day Manjarín had given Deportivo a 0–1 lead while Mijatovic had equalized the match. Seconds after the restart it was Alfredo who scored the 2-1 for Deportivo and the team hung on to this lead to win their first ever trophy.

The players most frequently used that campaign were: Liaño - Nando, Ribera, Djukic, Voro, López-Rekarte - Fran, Donato, Aldana - Manjarín, Bebeto

== 1995-1998: More difficult times ==
The team had given coach Arsenio Iglesias a fine goodbye from Riazor when on 10 June 1995 it scored five goals against Logroñés (5–0). O zorro de Arteixo (“The Fox from Arteixo”) left the club of his life, after giving them their first ever trophy in 19, and was replaced by Welshman John Benjamin Toshack.

The expectations were now higher than ever because the club had been performing well for three Liga campaigns in a row, won a Copa del Rey and played six rounds of UEFA Cup football. A very experienced Deportivo squad, with most players around their thirties, had to finish the job.

=== 1995–1996 ===
Deportivo were among the title favourites because of playmaker Fran, World Champions Mauro Silva and Bebeto, Zamora-winning goalkeeper Liaño, talented Manjarín and Paco, veterans Djukic and Donato at the back and World Cup participant Voro accompanying them in the Galician squad. Besides, new coach John Toshack had won a Copa with Real Sociedad, the Liga with Real Madrid and was known for his capability to do most with limited means. Winning the Teresa Herrera tournament that summer of 1995, after the last victory had been in 1969, also indicated that the club had grown. The qualities of the squad were immediately shown when in August 1995 the team won the Supercopa 1995 5–1 on aggregate against Real Madrid. The second prize won was a fact. The 3–0 home win in Riazor against the giants was marvelous, but winning 1–2 in Madrid did not completely satisfy Toshack. He made a remarkable comment by saying that “my players should feel ashamed about this title because of the way we played here”. A difficult relationship with the club and its players was born.

But the season 1995–1996 did not go as expected. Veterans like Beguiristain (31), a personal addition by Toshack but criticized by the supporters, and Martín-Vázquez (29) were added to the squad while two youngsters were signed in Radchenko (24) and Milovanovic (22). Deportivo confirmed their status as title favorites by winning 3–0 against Valencia in the first match of the season. But then things became more complicated. The team suffered a humiliating defeat at Compostela (4–0), later at home against Racing de Santander (2–3) and away to Real Sociedad (2–1) and Atlético de Madrid (1–0). These three defeats in a row was the worst series of the club for many years. In October 1995 the team were 12th in the domestic league but still showed glimpses of their class: in the Cup Winners’ Cup, Apoel Nicosia was crushed 8–0 in Riazor with three goals by Bebeto. And the Brazilian magician incredibly scored all five goals in the home win against Albacete (5–0). But it was exactly Bebeto who was not amused when Toshack took him off during a hard-fought victory against Sporting Gijón (1–0). Bebeto insulted Toshack's mother, and another row was born. Later Bebeto threatened by leaving Deportivo if he was substituted again.

The atmosphere did not change much when Deportivo stumbled towards December. A match in Bilbao was lost 1–0 in the final minutes and Deportivo had not scored a Liga goal for more than 4.5 matches. Toshack said that “my squad is quite old and needs to be changed a lot to be able to think about the future”. The only positive aspect of these weeks was the 4–0 on aggregate elimination of Trabzonspor in the Cup Winners’ Cup. Neither did much change during the remainder of the season. On occasions, the team was inspired, like surrounding the change of year when three matches were won in a row: 6–0 at Rayo Vallecano, followed by a 3–0 home win against Real Madrid (all goals scored by Bebeto) and a 2–0 victory at Real Oviedo. Deportivo climbed five positions in the table. In January for the first time in many years a point was taken away from Barcelona (1-1) and another remarkable away win was achieved, this time at Salamanca (5–0). According to Toshack, “Deportivo have been the best Spanish team in January. Some may have equaled us, but certainly haven’t done better”. But that month also saw the exit of the Copa del Rey-holders at Tenerife and giving away a 0–1 lead at Valencia (2–1 loss). Deportivo finished the month as eighth in Spain.

In February, Toshack's team only took two points out of a possible twelve and were tenth at the end of March 1996. What sparkled some light on that campaign were the performances in Europe as in March 1996 Spanish neighbours, and winners of the year before, Zaragoza were kicked out by Deportivo. Youngster David Fernández gave the Galicians a 1–0 home win while a goal of Bebeto in the away match proved to be enough to secure the pass (1-1). That month, Toshack accused his squad of having “a lack of ambition, not being hungry enough. This team lacks some bastards”. In April, a late and undeserved home defeat against Paris-Saint Germain (0–1) spoiled the European campaign and the team could not fix it in Paris (1–0 defeat). The team was not prepared yet for European success. But three wins and one draw in the Liga that April seemed to save Depor's season. Since the home win against Albacete, on 1 October 1995, the best qualification would be a sixth place on 29 April 1996. It was not to be though, because the Galicians only took one point out of the final twelve and suffered a terrible 0–4 home defeat against Real Oviedo.

The crowd was fed up with Toshack. "Depor sí, Toshack no" was heard in Riazor. Half a year later, Toshack said about this season's squad that "it was the worst group of players I’ve seen in 20 years. I couldn’t identify myself with the identity of those people. They were settled, burned out and there wasn’t a future nor youth. I needed all my 18 years of experience as a coach to survive."

The players most frequently used that campaign were: Liaño - Nando/Villarroya, Paco, Djukic, Voro, López-Rekarte - Fran, Donato, Aldana/Alfredo - Manjarín, Bebeto

=== 1996/1997: Rivaldo's year ===
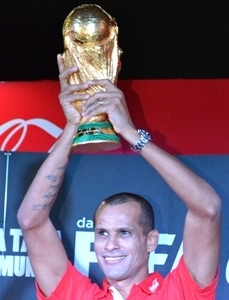
Rivaldo

The performances of the campaign before indicated that the season 1996/1997 would be decisive for the way Deportivo would go. Striker Bebeto (32) announced in 1996 that his time at Deportivo was over and he returned to Brazil after four impressive seasons at the Galician club. As the end of the generation was near of the players who had brought Deportivo to the top of Spain, there were doubts what the near future would bring.

Good news came from a 7-year television contract which Deportivo signed with Canal+ and earned the club around €135 million. The new age of financing a club through television, merchandising and other publicity acts was beginning to make a serious mark on Deportivo too. Many Spanish clubs signed lucrative deals and some began to call the Primera División the Liga de las Estrellas because the arrival of players like Ronaldo (FC Barcelona) and Roberto Carlos (Real Madrid).

Deportivo president Lendoiro had understood well from the last campaign that the squad needed changes. And during the summer of 1996, Toshack got the squad change he wished. Deportivo invested wisely in players like Songo'o, Kouba, Naybet, Armando, Bonnissel, Martins and Madar while veterans like Aldana, Liaño, Bebeto, López-Rekarte and Villarroya left the club. The fact that Deportivo were growing, also financially, resulted in the biggest signing ever the club made that summer by acquiring Brazilian midfielder Rivaldo (24). He was supposed to replace star player Bebeto and cost the club about €7,4 million. So, Deportivo had bought their first ‘star’ and this had a big influence on its confidence. But had the relationship between Toshack and his squad never been a good one, his partnership with president Lendoiro got more difficult and the Riazor crowd never were very fond of the Welsh coach. When the club decided that the 1996 pre-season would be held outside of La Coruña, Toshack said that “instead of signing players for so much money, Lendoiro should have constructed training facilities”.

Without having qualified for European football, all eyes were set on the Liga where Deportivo would have their best start of a season ever. At the end of the year 1996, Deportivo were still unbeaten and, together with FC Barcelona, at just two points of leaders Real Madrid. Only during the first three matchdays were situated out of the first five. The new defence was like in old times and only leaked eight goals in seventeen matches, while playmakers Martins (six goals) and Rivaldo (seven goals) made the difference. Not that the team was playing spectacular football. It was effective. Seven victories were obtained with one goal difference and seven matches were drawn. Toshack received a financial punishment by the Spanish FA for remarks he made about the referee of the match against Real Madrid. The Welsh coach also criticized his own club in an interview with Don Balón. He called Deportivo “a club without a solid base, something like a castle in the air. To reach the level of the big clubs, there’s still a mountain of work to do. Deportivo is under construction and it’s important that this is made clear”. At the end of the year, Toshack had a row with midfielder Martín-Vázquez after he took the player off minutes after bringing him on at Sevilla. About Depor's supporters, Toshack said: “They always seem to have devaluated my work. But now things are changing, thanks to our good Liga position”. Deportivo had been unbeaten for seventeen consecutive Liga matches, a record by far in its history.

The expectations were high when on 4 January 1997 FC Barcelona visited Riazor. In the weeks before, Lendoiro took the total investment for that season to €31 million by signing goalkeeper Nuno, Benfica's Hélder, midfielder Flávio Conceição (by beating Real Madrid on the transfer market) and striker Renaldo. But the magic had disappeared. Pizzi's late goal earned Barcelona three points (0–1) and on the day after Toshack announced that, at the end of the season, he would not continue at Deportivo. This declaration might have been influenced by some paintings which were visible at the stadium, like “Toshack Go Home” and “Toshack, bastard”.

That month Deportivo threw away their title chances by taking just three points out of a possible fifteen. A Copa exit against Sevilla was avoided on penalties. The match at Real Madrid could have been a turn-around with Deportivo leading twice, but losing in the end (3–2). Depor's Copa exit at Espanyol and the 2–2 home draw against arch-rivals Celta were too much. The gap with Real Madrid had grown to fifteen points in less than two months and the Galicians were threatened by Real Sociedad and Atlético de Madrid for the European places. Toshack himself was openly flirting with Newcastle United. With the results not covering him anymore, his bad relationship with the squad (Flávio Conceição also had a row with him) and his almost catastrophic cooperation with Lendoiro, Toshack resigned. His relationship with the Riazor crowd was terrible. Two weeks after he had announced his departure, he had infuriated them during the home match against Athletic Bilbao. When Martins scored Depor's second goal (2–1) just before the break, he turned towards the crowd and shouted: “Now you will be applauding, hijos de puta…”. But that was not all, as Naybet made an obscene gesture and Rivaldo looked like wanting to throw his shirt at him. After the Copa match against Sevilla there was another such an incident. Earlier, Toshack was asked if there was a divorce between him and the crowd. “A divorce? To be divorced one first has to be married. And that never existed between me and the crowd. For a part of them, I’m responsible for all. But a moment arrives when I consider it to be enough”.

Assistant coach José Manuel Corral was in charge when the team drew 0–0 against Atlético and did not win for a seventh consecutive time. This match was the only one of Deportivo since its promotion to the Primera División in 1991 that was played outside of Riazor, but in Santiago de Compostela. After an earlier home draw with Tenerife (0-0, with Madar receiving a red card), referee Japón Sevilla was hit with a coin coming from the Riazor crowd. The Comité de Competición of the Spanish FA (RFEF) punished Deportivo with the closure of Riazor for one match, which was confirmed by the Comité de Apelación of the RFEF and the Comité Español de Disciplina Deportiva of the Consejo Superior de Deportes. But Deportivo did not accept and went to ordinary justice: the Tribunal Superior de Justicia de Madrid. This is against FIFA rules and the club was threatened with punishment (like suspension from international football) if it would continue. In the end, Deportivo retreated.

After the departure of Toshack, the arrival of Brazilian coach Carlos Alberto Silva brought new life into the team and Deportivo stayed unbeaten for eighth matches including six consecutive victories. It were the months of Rivaldo as he scored 12 goals between 19 February 1997 and 3 May 1997. These goals were not enough though to put Deportivo back into the fight for the title because too much points had been wasted in the previous months while Real Madrid and Barcelona did not fail.

The team experienced a low in their performances when it won just one out of the final six matches, just enough to secure the third place. But the good thing was that it earned them a ticket for the next UEFA Cup tournament and restored some pride in the team. Rivaldo had scored 21 goals that campaign while another new signing, Songo'o, won the Trofeo Zamora.

The players most frequently used that campaign were: Songo'o - Nando, Djukic/Hélder, Naybet, Armando - Rivaldo, Mauro Silva, Martins, Donato - Manjarín, Renaldo

=== 1997/1998: Disastrous season despite investments ===
So Deportivo signed players like Rivaldo and Flávio Conceição, and the experiences had been excellent. This caused the club to spend about €14 million for the season 1997/1998 on two new Brazilian players: Djalminha (26) and Luizão (21). Other new signings were Moroccan striker Bassir, Spanish defender Ramis and Nigerian goalkeeper Rufai. Now the team could line-up an impressive line consisting of Mauro Silva, Flávio Conceição, Rivaldo, Djalminha and Luizão and other teams noticed it too.

The Galicians impressed during the pre-season and after the fine previous campaign once again started to look like serious title contenders. What nobody expected though was that Barcelona reached deep in their pockets to take away star player Rivaldo from them. Hours before the transfer dead-line would pass, Barcelona paid the buy-out clause of more than €25 million and snatched away the most important player of the team.

Together with the departure of Miroslav Djukic, who had been the defensive chief for seven years, the team missed vital players and never proved to be in balance. Added to this fact that the squad became called the "United Nations" because it would include 15 foreign players that campaign.

All combined this did not work out. On 15 October 1997 the home match against Valladolid was lost (1–3) while two weeks earlier Auxerre had proved to be too strong in the first round of the UEFA Cup tournament. Coach Silva was sacked and once again José Manuel Corral took over. This did not help much as the team experienced the Liga like a wounded boxer and never passed place number eleven.

In fact, after a 1–0 defeat at Valencia the relegation places came dangerously close and Lendoiro decided to act. He signed two strikers from South-America in Abreu and 'Manteca' Martínez as these two men should lift Deportivo in the standings. Abreu scored the winning goal on his debut against Sporting de Gijón (2–1) and scored a total of three goals in three weeks. After winning 3–1 against Barcelona and a 0–1 win at Racing de Santander the team had climbed six places in the table. But that proved to be it for this campaign as Abreu appeared to be lacking discipline while 'Manteca' Martínez did not score a single goal.

The team moved between places eleven and fourteen, suffered an embarrassing 2–6 home defeat against neighbours Compostela, and eventually finished on position number twelve. Djalminha had been doing fine that season although the rest of the squad could not keep up. Winning the Trofeo Zamora was out of the question as the team even scored less (44 goals) than it had leaked (46 goals). In fact, the team suffered a helpless exit from the Copa del Rey tournament against Segunda División club Alavés and were lucky to escape more relegation problems. But despite these problems Deportivo remained strong on the financial front.

The players most frequently used that campaign were: Songo'o - Bonnissel, Naybet, Paco, Armando - Fran, Flávio Conceiçao, Mauro Silva, Hadji, Djalminha - Bassir/Abreu

== 1998-2000: Irureta builds Liga winning team ==
After having played two disappointing seasons out of the last three, president Lendoiro was looking for the final piece of the puzzle. The Riazor stadium had experienced new improvements and the squad consisted of quality players like Martins, Flávio Conceição, Djalminha, Donato, Fran, Mauro Silva and Naybet.

Nevertheless, the disappointing performances proved that something was wrong and Lendoiro looked to neighbours Celta de Vigo for a solution. Their coach, Javier Irureta, had achieved excellent performances with them and only near the end of the season dropped from the first three spots by finishing sixth. Lendoiro convinced Irureta of the possibilities at Deportivo and the Basque coach agreed to step in. A new era at the club was born.

=== 1998/1999: New confidence ===
New signings were made for the season 1998/1999 in taking Romero, Manuel Pablo, Schürrer, Ziani, Pauleta and 'Turu' Flores and the team impressed during the Teresa Herrera tournament by defeating Atlético de Madrid and Lazio Roma. But the new project needed time and fortunately Irureta was given it. Under severe criticism the team occupied Liga place number twelve after losing 1–2 at home against Racing de Santander on 10 January 1999 and were close to a Copa exit against Segunda División club Sporting de Gijón.

But as Rivaldo had been the saviour two years earlier when the team struggled, now 'Turu' Flores appeared as the new star. The Argentine forward had produced just three Liga goals until Deportivo started an impressive series of matches. The team survived the Copa round against Sporting de Gijón, kicked out favourites Celta (after an heroic display in Vigo (0–1) with a long list of injured players) and Mallorca from the tournament and in the Liga lost just one match out of the next eleven. There were wins against Real Madrid (4–0) and Celta de Vigo (2–1) and 'Turu' Flores produced 13 goals between 17 January 1999 and 25 April 1999.

After a 1–2 win at Mallorca the team even occupied the third position in the Liga and looked to be heading towards Champions League qualification. But in the end Deportivo came two points short of finishing fourth and had to settle for position number six. Five days earlier it had let escape a perfect opportunity to play the Copa del Rey final, but Atlético de Madrid proved to be too strong. Nevertheless, Deportivo were back in Europe and had found another quality striker in 'Turu' Flores.

The players most frequently used that campaign were: Songo'o - Romero, Naybet, Schürrer, Armando - Fran, Flávio Conceiçao, Mauro Silva, Hadji, Djalminha - 'Turu' Flores

=== 1999/2000: Depor win Liga ===
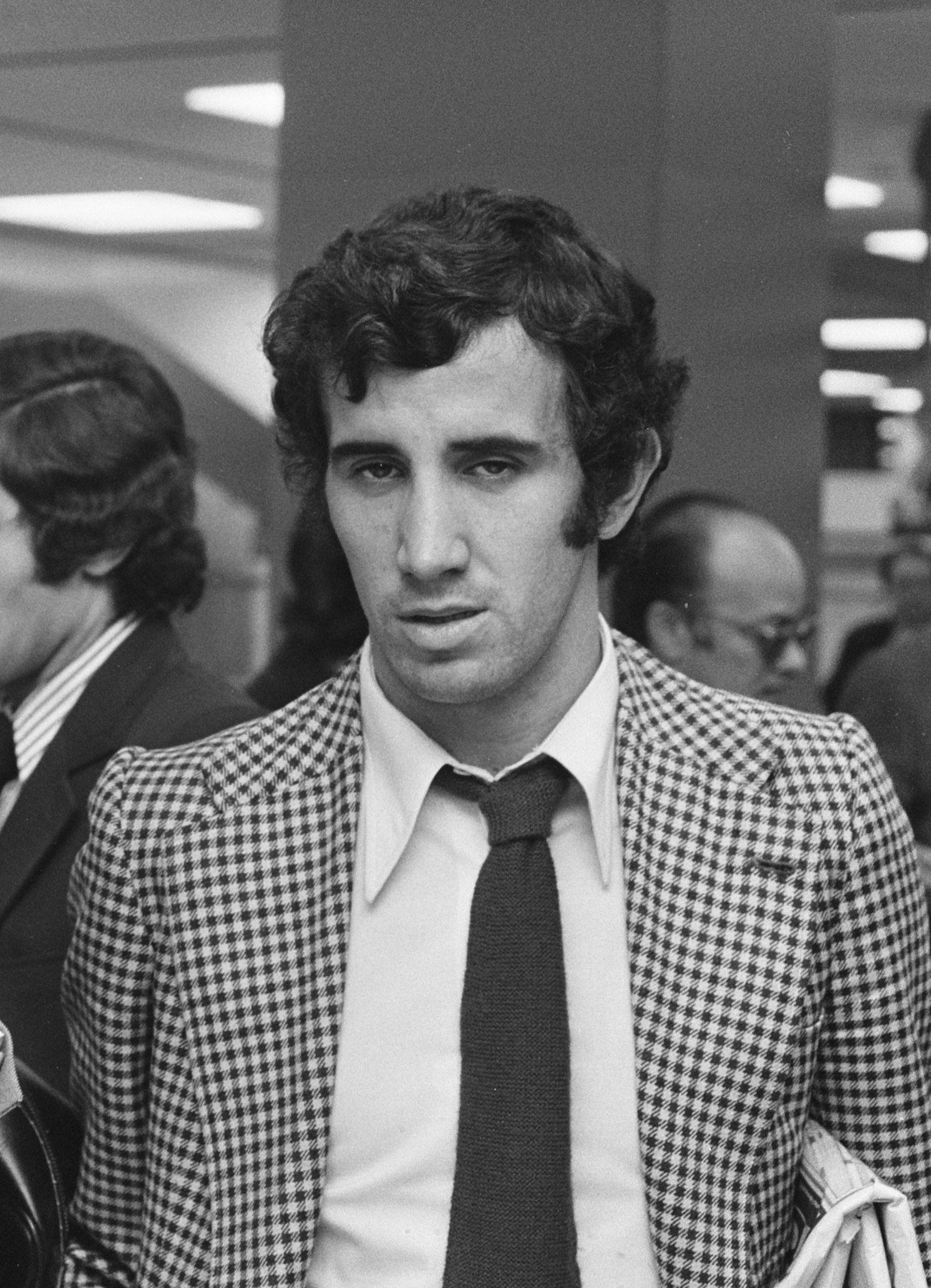
Javier Irureta

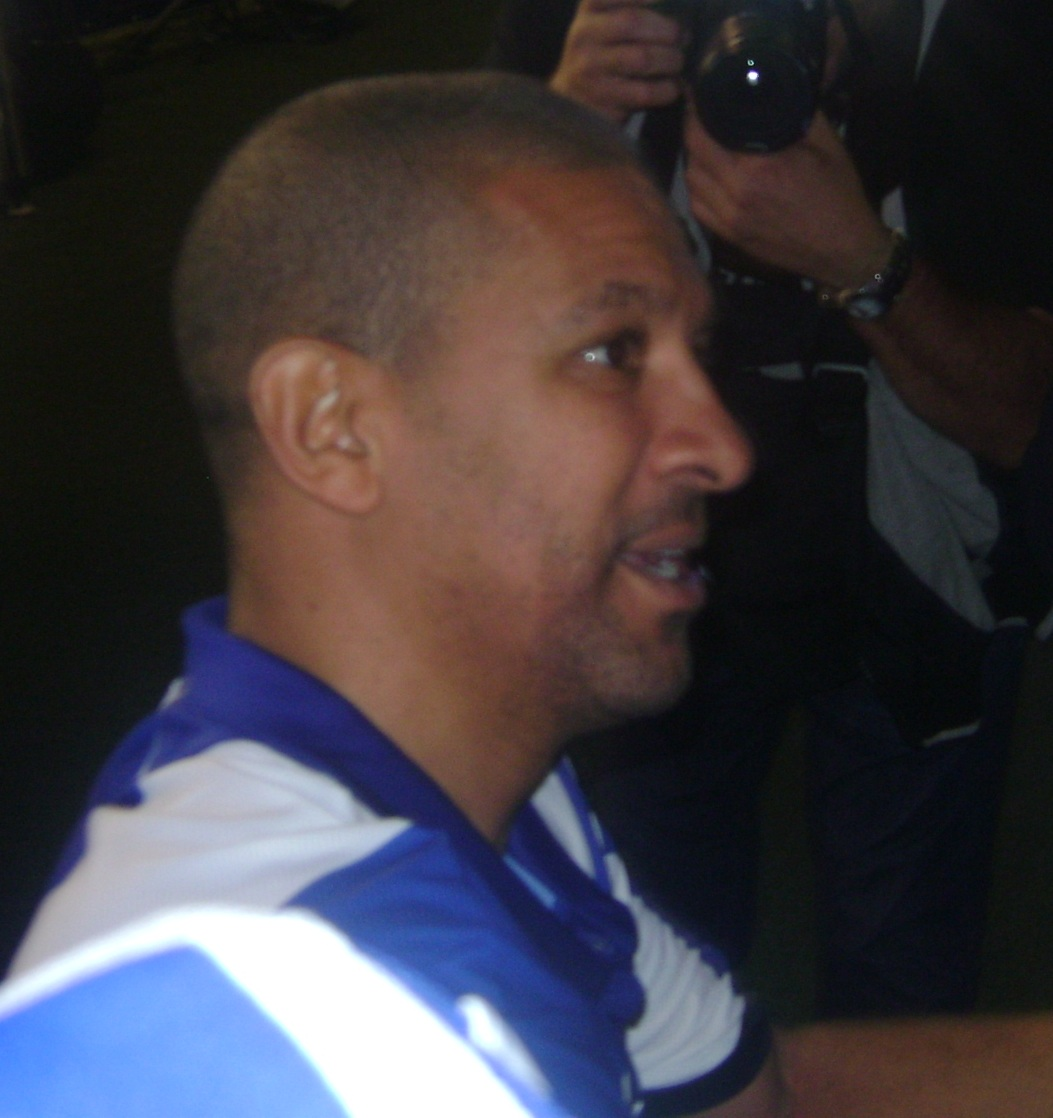
Djalminha

Despite the good performances of the previous campaign, nobody at Deportivo would have experienced in a dream like the season 1999/2000 evolved. In 1998 the club had just avoided relegation and already were delighted with the sixth place one year later. Their biggest signing in the summer of 1999 proved to be Roy Makaay as Deportivo spent about €8,6 million on him. Also César Martín, Víctor Sánchez and Jokanovic joined Deportivo that period. Together with experienced players like Songo’o, Naybet, Donato, Fran and Mauro Silva they would form a remarkable consistent team.

The team started the season well with a 4–1 victory against Alavés, with a hat-trick of Makaay, but found themselves on place number seven after a disappointing home defeat against Numancia (0–2) on 26 September 1999. Four days later the team narrowly escaped a UEFA Cup exit against little Stabaek but then an excellent period arrived. The team won seven Liga matches in a row, among which against Barcelona (2–1), Atlético de Madrid (1–3) and Celta de Vigo (1–0). On 21 November 1999 it earned them the first Liga spot after an impressive 5–2 home victory against Sevilla. Deportivo would stretch their lead to eighth points, survived a Copa round against Málaga and eliminated Montpellier and Panathinaikos from the UEFA Cup tournament. Deportivo were back at the top.

But it seemed the team could not handle the pressure really well as only one point was taken out of the next twelve including a dramatic 0–3 home defeat against Racing de Santander. The gap with Zaragoza was narrowed to just two points and favourites Barcelona were at four. Besides, the team suffered a Copa exit against Segunda División club Osasuna Pamplona. Nevertheless, the next weeks would produce just enough points to secure the first position. There was a fantastic 5–2 home win against Real Madrid although Arsenal proved to be too strong in the UEFA Cup tournament. On matchday 29 the team suffered a 2–1 defeat in the Nou Camp and Barcelona were now at just two points. The victory of Deportivo at Sevilla (1–3) in the next away match might have been crucial as it prevented Barcelona from taking over the first spot.

The final seven Liga matches were like a thriller. Every week there was the doubt whether the team could hung on to its small lead in the Liga. But 8 goals of Makaay in the final months brought his total to 22 Liga goals and were decisive for the title challenge. The team took just two points out of a possible nine before the final matchday of the season arrived. Espanyol were the opponent and this time Deportivo did not let escape a golden opportunity to win the Liga title. During this match the team never bothered about the score in the Nou Camp and soon were 2–0 up against the smaller Catalan team thanks to goals of Donato and Makaay.

Therefore, on 19 May 2000 the first Liga title was won in the 94-year history of the club. Deportivo also qualified, for the first time in its existence, for Champions League football. La Coruña exploded with joy and over 200,000 Galicians raced on to the streets. A massive celebration that lasted for infinite hours. The competition had been tight and fascinating this year, with Valencia and Real Madrid disputing an all-Spanish Champions League final, a modest Alavés becoming the revelation of the season and with the relegation of three giants: Sevilla, Atlético de Madrid and Betis Sevilla.

The players most frequently used that campaign were: Songo'o - Romero, Naybet, Donato, Manuel Pablo - Fran, Mauro Silva, Flávio Conceiçao, Víctor Sánchez, Djalminha - Makaay

== 2000-2004: 'Eurodepor' joins European 'Big Boys' ==
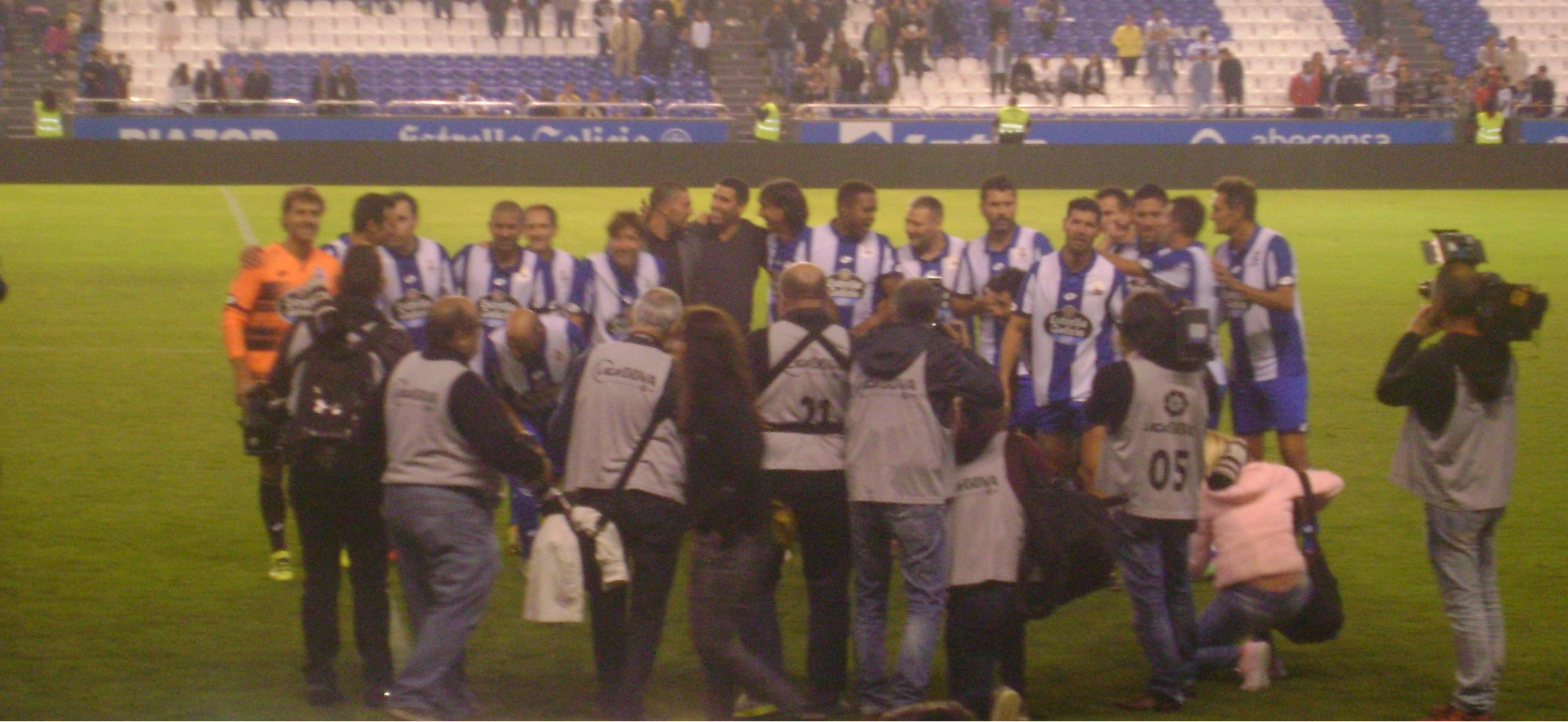
Euro Dépor players like Scaloni, Djalminha, Manuel Pablo, Diego Tristán, Noureddine Naybet, Amavisca, Jorge Andrade and Albert Luque after a veterans match

The year 2000 resembled 1995 as in both years Deportivo won a trophy. Also, in both years the Supercopa was won as in 2000 Deportivo conquered it against Copa del Rey winners Espanyol. The Galicians could add a fourth trophy to its cabinet but were after more.

There was movement in the squad because the departure of midfielder Flávio Conceicão to Real Madrid (for more than €26 million) and Pauleta (more than €5 million) allowed the team to sign the Atlético trio of Molina, Capdevila and Valerón, midfielders Duscher, Emerson and César Sampaio and strikers Pandiani and Tristán. The fact that six of them still are in the Deportivo squad today indicate that the team did some good business that summer. President Lendoiro knew that for winning matches (and money) in the Champions League the team needed a quality boost.

=== 2000/2001: Depor impress Europe ===
Winning the Teresa Herrera tournament in 1998 might have broken the curse that the team always plays awful seasons after winning it. But Deportivo beat Lazio during the final and started the season 2000/2001 exceptionally well. Until November 4, 2000, just one match was lost (3–0 at Real Madrid) and Deportivo took their first ever point in the Champions League (and their first goal scored by Naybet) by drawing 1–1 at Panathinaikos. This was followed by their first win against Hamburger SV (2–1) and an indication that the team was capable to get results at the highest level: a 0–0 draw in Delle Alpi against Juventus.

The team encountered no problems surviving their first Champions League group and finished first while they achieved their first ever away win after an impressive 1–3 victory at Paris-Saint Germain in the second group phase. On 2 December 2000 the team also conquered the first Liga spot after beating Espanyol (0–2). But after it the first serious setbacks of the campaign arrived. Deportivo lost 0–1 at home against AC Milan, were kicked out of the Copa del Rey by Segunda División club Tenerife and took just four out of a possible twelve Liga points.

Fortunately things changed round again and on 27 February 2001 the team achieved a 2–3 in Nou Camp for the first time in its history while one week later it completely outplayed Real Madrid in Riazor. Deportivo wasted numerous chances to score in this match though while the visitors were presented a penalty gift by the referee, meaning the match only finished 2-2. It was a decisive blow for the Liga options of Deportivo as the team would stay at the second position until the end of the campaign.

In Europe things had become complicated after a 1–0 loss at Galatasaray. It obliged Deportivo to win both their home matches against the Turkish team and Paris-Saint Germain, and the Galicians overcame their first hurdle by winning 2–0 against Galatasaray. But Paris-Saint Germain took a shocking 0–3 lead just after the break of their match until Deportivo started an amazing come-back. Substitute Pandiani scored three goals while Tristán added one, culminating in a sensational 4–3 victory. On 13 March 2001 the team finished off AC Milan in their own stadium through an amazing penalty kick of Djalminha. For the first time in its history Deportivo were among the final eighth in the most important European tournament.

The Deportivo squad exited in the quarter-final round after suffering a defeat by a score of 3–0 despite a win at their stadium of 2–0 against the Leeds United side. Domestically, the Deportivo ended up second in the Spanish Primera Division. Diego Tristán, a striker who had joined the squad that season, netted 19 times in league football.

The players most frequently used that campaign were: Molina - Romero, Naybet, Donato, Manuel Pablo - Fran, Mauro Silva, Emerson, Víctor Sánchez, Valerón - Tristán/Makaay

=== 2001/2002: Copa win at the Bernabeu ===
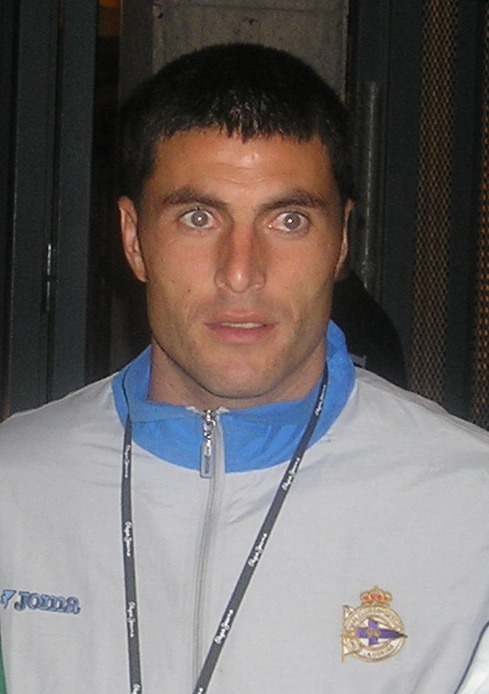
Diego Tristán scored a goal in Copa final.

During the season 2001/2002 the team simply continued its impressive performances of the previous two campaigns. The squad had experienced radical changes during the previous summers and Spanish players started covering most places. In 2001 the only spectacular transfer was the one of midfielder Sergio who cost the club a small fortune (almost €18 million). Other additions, like Djorovic, Amavisca and Héctor, only indicated that the squad already was competent enough to approach the new campaign.

This season showed Europe that the previous European performances of the team were not just lucky ones. On 25 September 2001 the team won their first ever match against a big European club as Manchester United were beaten 2–1 in Riazor thanks to late goals of Pandiani and Naybet. The participation of Deportivo in Europe had been in danger after the 0–1 score and the previous 2–2 home draw against Olympiakos Piraeus. On 17 October 2001 the team repeated its trick by winning 2–3 at Old Trafford thanks to two goals of Tristán and one from Sergio. It allowed the team during matchday five to qualify for the next round and to stay unbeaten in the tournament in the final match.

In the Liga things went smooth too as Deportivo occupied the first position from 13 October 2001 until 1 December 2001. Deportivo would finish the year 2001 as Liga leaders after a 2–0 home win against Betis and added another English scalp to its total after beating Arsenal 2–0 in Riazor. However, a 3–0 beating at Bayer Leverkusen indicated that a pass from the second group was all but secured yet.

As usual, the Liga performances at the start of the new year crumbled down and Deportivo even dropped to the seventh place after losing 3–0 at Valladolid. They again occupied this place on 16 February 2002 after losing 3–2 at Barcelona. But the thing this season was that the Liga was more equal than ever. After matchday 26 Liga leaders Valencia had 44 points while eighth placed Alavés had 39. In between were placed Real Madrid, Barcelona, Celta de Vigo, Betis Sevilla and Athletic Bilbao.

Luckily, Deportivo regained their form and showed class against Italian Champions League participants Juventus. Molina saved the team from defeat in the group away match by stopping a penalty kick of Del Piero. But the Italians had no chance in Riazor and were beaten 2–0.

Best day that season proved to be 6 March 2002. Without making much noise Deportivo had reached the final of the Copa del Rey tournament after beating clubs like Marino, Leonesa, Valladolid and Figueres. It earned them a place in the final against highly motivated Real Madrid, to be played on their exact 100th birthday in the Bernabéu stadium.

But despite all indicated to a Real Madrid home win, the Galicians stayed calm, took a shocking early lead through Sergio and added a second one just before the break thanks to Diego Tristán. The team could have finished it off in the second half but saw Real Madrid desperately fighting itself back into the match. In the end this did not prove to be enough and Deportivo added their second Copa del Rey to its cabinet (1–2).

Winning the cup tournament already made the season a successful one, but the team wanted more. Six days later Arsenal encountered Spanish fury in their own stadium and had absolutely no chance (0–2). It earned Deportivo much respect in Europe and qualification for the Quarter Finals for a second time in a row.

But the Quarter Finals once again proved to be the end station. And for the second time it was an English club eliminating Deportivo. The team had no options at all during the Riazor encounter with Manchester United (0–2) and miracles stayed away in the return leg (3–2). It left the team frustrated because it was capable of doing more.

The good thing was that all focus could be aimed at the Liga and the team approached the top match against Valencia on matchday 35 being placed just two points behind them and one after Real Madrid. The options were over though after a Duscher own goal gave the home team the advantage and the boost to win the Liga title. Fortunately, Deportivo secured the second Liga position on the final day of the season after a 3–0 win against Real Madrid. Diego Tristán finished as Pichichi of the Liga with 21 goals while Valerón had found his place in the team. Once again the future looked bright.

The players most frequently used that campaign were: Molina - Romero, Naybet, Donato/César Martín, Lionel Scaloni - Fran/Amavisca, Mauro Silva, Sergio, Valerón, Víctor Sánchez - Tristán/Makaay

=== 2002/2003: Makaay's final season ===
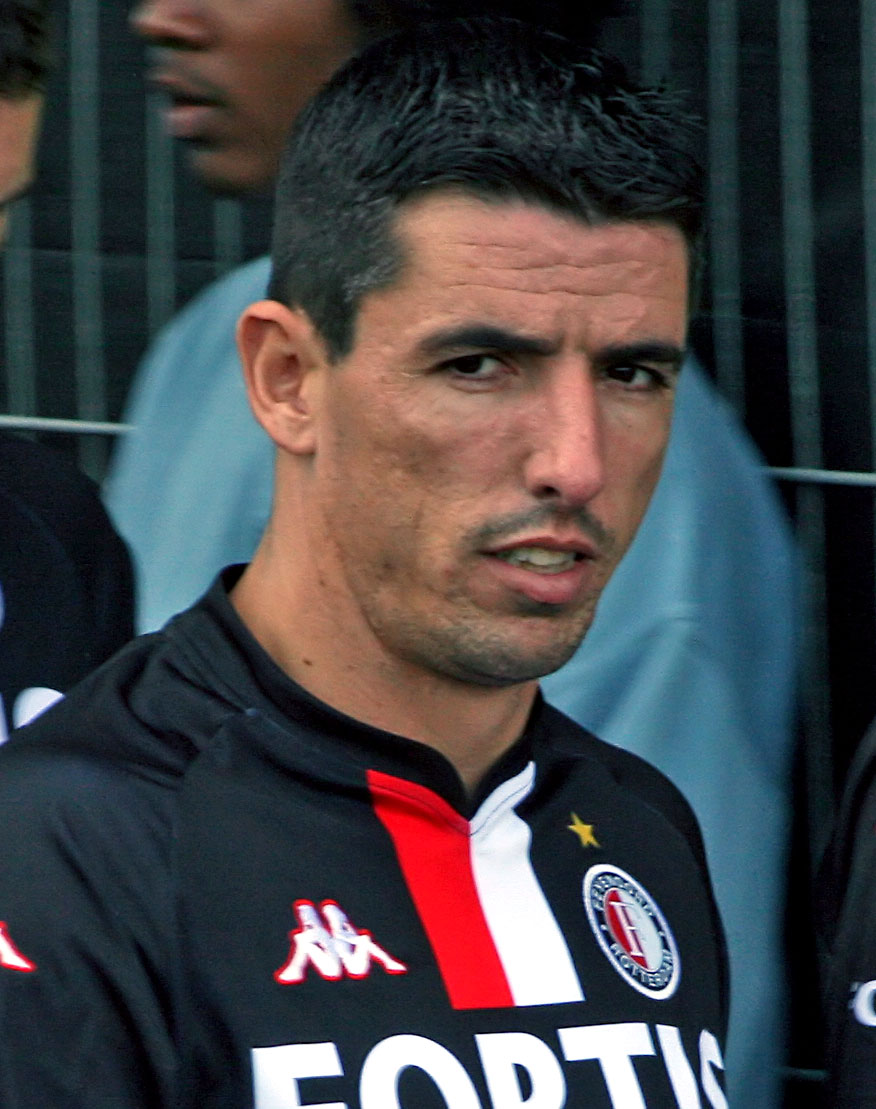
Roy Makaay

In 2002 the club made three big signings in getting Jorge Andrade (24), Albert Luque (24) and 'Toro' Acuña (30). It cost the club €38 million, the sale of 'Turu' Flores and a loan out of Walter Pandiani to Mallorca but indicated that the club wanted to grow even more. And the fairy tale just continued during the season 2002/2003. A third Supercopa was added to the growing list of prizes after beating champions Valencia twice in August 2002 (3-0 and 0–1). Although the Liga started with a disappointing 2–4 home defeat against Betis Sevilla, and a serious injury of Jorge Andrade, soon another historic chapter would be written. It was on 18 September 2002 when a hat-trick of Roy Makaay earned Deportivo a 2–3 win at Bayern Munich. The first ever Spanish win in Munich and no European team had produced three goals in the Olympic stadium in the years before.

But three days later influential midfielder Valerón, who had been vital in the conquest of Munich, was seriously injured after a nasty challenge of Valladolid defender Peña. Suddenly the team had lost its reference and wandered helplessly against Milan in Riazor (0–4). It would be a difficult period as Liga matches against Racing de Santander (0–2) and Villarreal (3–1) were lost while a 3–1 home win against Lens was equalized by the French club in their own stadium.

Deportivo had dropped to ninth place in the domestic league but were relieved by two strikes of Makaay at Rayo Vallecano (1–2). The Dutch striker produced twelve goals including these in the first two months of the season and three days later added another one in a crucial match. On 29 October 2002 the team desperately needed a victory at home against Bayern Munich and achieved one thanks to a late goal of Makaay. Two weeks later a narrow 1–2 away win against already qualified AC Milan was enough to earn Deportivo another place in the second round of the Champions League. But it had been a narrow escape.

The team was plagued with injuries and suspensions and Irureta never could use the players he wanted. On 7 December 2002 the team occupied a disappointing eighth position after a 1–1 draw at lowly Recreativo de Huelva. In the Liga this was to be the turning point, but in Europe things got very complicated. The team gave away a 2–0 home lead against Juventus (2-2) and were helpless at Manchester United (2–0 loss). Not until the end of February would there come an option to fix this, and until then the team could concentrate on the Liga and Copa.

The next three Liga matches were won against Málaga (1–0), Valencia (0–1) and Celta de Vigo (3–0) and it permitted the team to occupy the third position on 4 January 2003 at still seven points of surprising leaders Real Sociedad. When the next Champions League match against Basel arrived on 19 February, the team had taken ten out of a possible eighteen Liga points and survived Copa rounds against Alicante and Murcia. But Mallorca had beaten Deportivo 2–3 in Riazor in the Semifinal of this tournament while Basel added salt to their wounds by inflicting a shocking 1–0 defeat in Switzerland.

Now Deportivo were wounded, but not dead. In Europe it revived by a narrow 1–0 home win against Basel although it could not hang on to a 1–2 lead at Juventus. The Italians scored a dramatic injury-time winner and it was the end of Deportivo in Europe. For the first time in three campaigns the team did not survive the second group phase. But once again the team could aim its focus on the domestic Liga.

Seven days before the European exit at Juventus the team was eliminated from the Copa del Rey tournament at Mallorca (1-1). But in the Liga the return of Valerón and Molina, who had been out with cancer, provided a much needed boost. The team achieved seven wins in eight Liga matches, among which victories against Alavés (6–0), Real Sociedad (2–1) and Barcelona (2–4). The win against the Basque team lifted Deportivo to the second place at just three points of Liga leaders Real Madrid. Although the team was slaughtered 3–0 at Mallorca, victories against Recreativo (5–0, with the Liga debut of Dani Mallo) and Málaga (0–2) gave the team the first Liga spot on 10 May 2003. Real Sociedad had equal points while Real Madrid followed at just one point.

One will never know what happened then, but Deportivo failed to take this unique opportunity. It lost its next match at home to Valencia (1–2) while one week later neighbours Celta de Vigo inflicted final damage by winning (3–0). As had been the case during the whole of the season, the team proved to be too irregular in its performances. Losing 3–0, twice, in the final weeks of the Liga and being defeated at home is something that cannot be afforded. But it happened and in the end the team finished third, behind Real Sociedad and at six points of champions Real Madrid.

A look back to this season reveals that, once again, Deportivo finished among the top clubs in Spain. Winning a tournament might be influenced by luck and specific moments, but over 38 matches it's time for regular performances. Since 2000 the team has finished among the first three clubs in Spain and in 2003 the third place was a good achievement after a difficult season. Roy Makaay was crowned European topscorer after having produced 29 Liga goals, 9 in the Champions League and 1 in the Copa del Rey. In August 2003 it earned him a much discussed €19 million transfer to Bayern Munich.

The fact that there had been so many injuries means it's not possible to indicate a team consisting of the most frequently used players.

After the departure of topscorer Roy Makaay many assumed this was the beginning of the end for Deportivo, also because the summer of 2003 was the least active one considering new signings since the return to the Primera División in 1991. The goalkeeping section was reinforced with the return of Jacques Songo'o and the €2.5 million signing of Munúa. But the only fieldplayer to arrive those months was Pedro Munitis, who came on a free transfer from Real Madrid.

=== 2003/2004: Final four in Europe ===
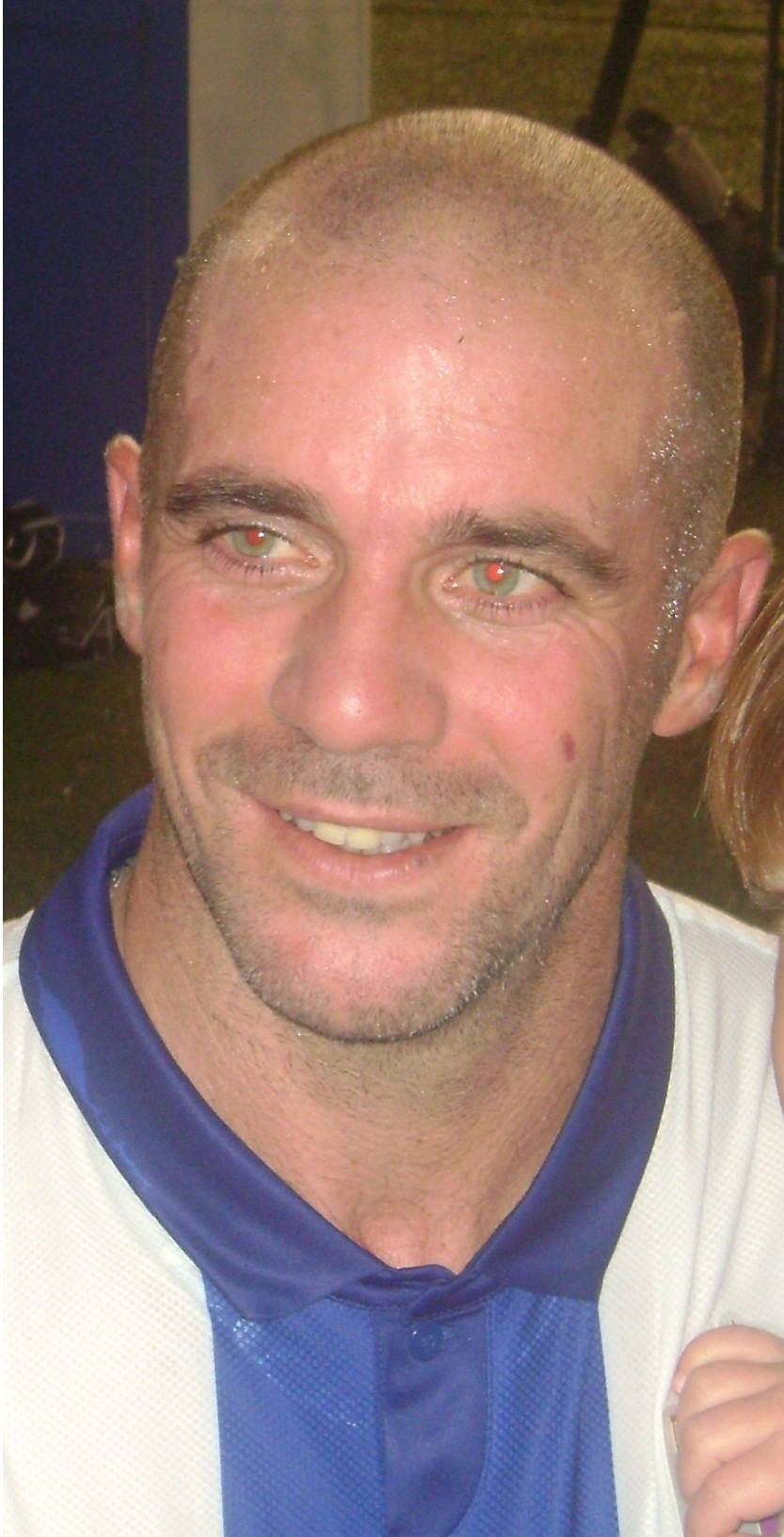
Walter Pandiani

At the start of the 2003/2004 season Deportivo were obligated to play pre-round European matches for the first time in their history. The club had to cope with a competitive Champions League pre-round draw as Rosenborg were attached to the Galicians. After 180 minutes of football only one goal had been scored between the two sides, by Albert Luque in Riazor (1–0) after a 0–0 draw in Norway. For the fifth time in a row Deportivo had qualified for the Champions League.

But before the first European match was to be played there were three matches in the Primera División. The start of the team was perfect as all of them were won, including two difficult away matches. The first match of the season was broken up near its end when Walter Pandiani scored the only goal at newly promoted Real Zaragoza (0–1). The midweek home match against Athletic Bilbao was a simple prey (2–0) and ten days later another important victory was achieved at Sevilla (1–2). So Deportivo had a perfect score after three matches and led the standings with two points over Real Madrid, Barcelona and Valencia. Besides, Walter Pandiani had scored three goals in three matches and promised to become important this season while the defence looked tight.

The scoring drift of Pandiani, who had returned from a loan spell at Mallorca, was amazing as he scored eight matches in a row. After his three goals during the start of the Spanish season he earned Deportivo a point in Greece against AEK Athens (1-1) during the first match of the Champions League group. He scored another (from the spot) against PSV Eindhoven during a 2-0 European home victory and scored two more (against Albacete and Osasuna Pamplona). But while the home match against little Albacete did not cause problems (3–0), Deportivo lost its first match of the season at Osasuna (3–2) after a 3–0 score. Valencia took over the lead in the Primera División and the Galicians took a step back to earth.

But October proved to be an excellent month as three out of four Liga matches were won, Deportivo survived in the Copa del Rey and achieved its second European victory. The Liga wins obtained in Riazor were against Atlético de Madrid (5–1) and Valencia (2–1) while a serious team achieved a brilliant 0–2 victory at the Nou Camp. It was the third win of Deportivo in this stadium out of the last four encounters and the poor Catalans suffered. After the win against Valencia the Galicians led the Primera División again and the team looked stable. A line-up filled with many reserves achieved a late Copa victory at regional rivals Compostela, but this match was overshadowed by the violent death of Deportivo supporter Manuel Ríos Suárez.

In Europe the team remained unbeaten as an important victory was achieved at home against AS Monaco (1–0). A goal of Diego Tristán was enough to give the Galicians seven points after three matches although this time luck was on Deportivo's side. The team suffered against the French side and were fortunate to keep the points at home, something which did not happen against Mallorca on 29 October. Deportivo lost its first home match that season (0–2) and saw the gap being narrowed to just one point.

November did not prove to be as successful as October as the team lost its steam. The four Liga matches that month only delivered five points and Deportivo dropped to the third place behind Valencia and Real Madrid. There were 0-0 draws at Murcia and Betis Sevilla while the team even lost its home match against Villarreal (0–1). The only domestical highlight that month was a 2–1 victory against Real Sociedad after being 0–1 down. This match was played just three days after Deportivo suffered the worst humiliation in their history: an 8–3 defeat at AS Monaco. Despite a great goal of Diego Tristán, which even was crowned Eurosports's Goal of the Year, the team looked completely lost. During the break Molina was left behind sick in the dressing room and within minutes his replacement, Munúa, leaked several goals. Fortunately this mistake was made up during the 3–0 home win against AEK Athens that same months.

The end of 2004 saw Deportivo achieving 'normal' results. The best what happened that month was the qualification for the next round of the Champions League. The final match of the group was played at PSV Eindhoven and Deportivo looked out with the score being 2–0. But Albert Luque scored a vital goal after which the Dutch side needed to score at least two more. This task was not fulfilled and the match finished 3–2, enough to qualify on goaldifference. Deportivo also survived in another tournament as little Gimnàstic de Tarragona were beaten 1–2.

But the Liga title slipped away that month, also because some crucial decisions during the match at Real Madrid (2–1). A goal of Albert Luque was falsely cancelled because of offside while moments later Ronaldo scored 1-0 when clearly having advantage of an offside position. A brave Deportivo side kept on pressing and scored the equalizer through Pandiani, before Raúl scored the winner near the end. In the other three matches that month the team stayed unbeaten (home wins against Málaga and Espanyol and a 1–1 draw at Valladolid), meaning that Deportivo entered 2005 as third in the Liga and alive in Europe.

Because the Champions League only was to restart at the end of February, the focus in the first weeks lay on the domestic competitions. Things went wrong in the Copa del Rey when Atlético scored a crucial away goal in Riazor (1-1) after a goalless draw in Madrid. But the Liga brought a lot of good news as Deportivo took none less than eighteen points out of a possible twenty-four those weeks. The 0–5 win at Celta de Vigo, with a hat-trick of Víctor Sánchez, already has become a classical one while Real Zaragoza were slaughtered in Riazor (4–1). Valuable were the points taken at Albacete (0–2) and Atlético de Madrid (0-0) while Deportivo secured six points in Riazor against Sevilla (1–0) and Osasuna (2–0). Only Racing de Santander (1-1) spoiled the party those weeks in La Coruña while the match at Athletic Bilbao was lost (1–0).

In Europe the restart of Deportivo was magnificent as Juventus were completely outplayed in Riazor. But only Albert Luque found the net (1–0) and this promised the return to become tense. But before this match in Turin was played the team threw away its options in the Liga. First there was a 2–3 loss at home against Barcelona, after a 0–3 score, and one week later the defeat at Valencia was heavy but unnecessary (3–0). Fortunately the team survived in Europe as an early goal of Walter Pandiani gave Deportivo their first ever victory at Juventus (0–1). After the elimination of the losing finalist of 2003 the winner of that edition was drawn to the club: AC Milan.

The focus on the European matches caused Deportivo to lose another domestic match, the second that season against Mallorca (4–2). With all eyes set on the visit to the San Siro the home match against Murcia was just narrowly won (1–0). But the focus seemed to pay off as the start against the Italians was magnificent thanks to an early goal of Walter Pandiani. However, surrounding the break the match was thrown away with four goals leaked in the space of barely ten minutes (4–1). But again Real Sociedad proved to be the ideal partner to recover as 1-2 was achieved in the Liga although one week later two points were wasted at home against Betis Sevilla (2-2).

The match of 7 April 2004 against AC Milan will forever be written in the history books as Riazor almost exploded out of joy when the Italians were sent home with a 4–0 defeat. Pandiani, Valerón and Albert Luque gave the Galicians three goals before the break they only could have dreamed of and substitute Fran finished the job. For the first time in the history of the Champions League a team bounced back from a three-goal difference in the first leg and Deportivo secured their first ever place in the Semifinals of the Champions League.

However, those matches became a major deception for the team. On 21 April the match at FC Porto finished 0–0 with a ridiculous red card for ex-Porto defender Jorge Andrade. Two weeks later his replacement, César Martín, caused a penalty kick and that goal could not be matched by a helpless Deportivo (0–1). Mourinho's Porto went on to win the Champions League that year, and Deportivo only had the Liga left to end the season in a successful way.

The only motivation remaining was to finish third as the fourth place was already assured. Deportivo had taken eight points out of a possible twelve in the weeks before the Porto match and eliminated Real Madrid from the title race after a 2–0 win in Riazor. But the European exit against Porto was difficult to handle and Deportivo threw away their match at Espanyol (2–0). Nevertheless, for the fifth season in a row the team finished among the first three in Spain after beating Celta (3–0) and Racing de Santander (0–1). The team finished six points behind champions Valencia but ended just one point away from Barcelona. However, Real Madrid dropped down to fourth place and overall the domestic campaign had been successful for the Galicians. Meanwhile, the European achievements had been incredible.

The players most frequently used that campaign were: Molina - Capdevila, Naybet, Jorge Andrade, Manuel Pablo - Luque, Mauro Silva, Sergio, Valerón, Víctor Sánchez - Tristán/Pandiani

== 2004 - 2006: Stepping out of the elite ==
=== 2004/2005: Final season of Irureta, Fran and Mauro Silva ===
Depor's future looked promising when the summer of 2004 arrived. The European season had shown the team's enormous possibilities and Deportivo finished reasonably close to Liga champions Valencia. Despite the departure of Donato and Makaay one year earlier, the ageing of several squad players, and the financial difficulties, all surrounding Deportivo were hopeful. At the start of May coach Irureta and president Lendoiro agreed on another contract for the Basque coach. It would be his seventh season at the Galician club. Not many will have foreseen it would be his last.

New signings had been called for by manager Javier Irureta in an effort to bolster up the side. However, the club brought in very few new faces. While Rubén and Momo were signed from Las Palmas, both these players were then loaned out to Albacete. Instead, president of the club, Augusto César Lendoiro decided to try and better the financial state of the team by freeing up some players in order to bring down the cost of wages. Such players included Naybet and Djalminha who had spent eight and seven years at the club respectively, along with Djorovic the defender.

New players did not arrive, despite a summer full of rumours about Maniche, D’Alessandro, Caneira, Pablo Ibáñez, Mascherano, Eto’o and Saviola. Deportivo started the pre-round Champions League matches early at Shelbourne (0-0) without new additions. Luque's appearance in this match ended speculations about his possible Barcelona move. But something definitely had changed. Looking back it was too difficult for the squad to be fully motivated. They knew a unique chance to write history had been lost because of the elimination by Porto months earlier. Combined with the absence of fresh blood and diminishing authority of Irureta, the season would become a disaster. Added was the complaint filled by Fran against the club because of financial differences. One of the few good news topics those weeks were the Teresa Herrera wins against Sporting Lisbon and Atlético de Madrid.

After an hour in the return match against Shelbourne (3–0), Víctor Sánchez finally scored a Galician goal and Depor secured their place in the tournament. Four days later Walter Pandiani earned Deportivo a late Liga point in the first domestic match of the season at Espanyol (1-1). But then the situation went downhill. First there was the humiliation of August 31 when Deportivo could not even add unknown Murcia midfielder Acciari to the squad because of financial problems. Some days later there was a nasty training incident when Pandiani and Luque had a row. The Uruguayan striker scored his second goal of the season at home against Osasuna, but the Basques added three and shocked Riazor (1–3).

Three days later the team dominated the Champions League home match against Olympiakos Piraeus but could not score (0-0). A come-back from 1–0 down at Athletic Bilbao was achieved by goals from Pandiani and Luque (in injury-time). But both matches could not hide the mounting problems. These culminated in a humiliating 1–5 defeat against Valencia on 22 September, a late draw in Riazor against Betis (1-1) and a European defeat without options at AS Monaco (2–0).

After this disastrous start of the season, the worst under Irureta, in October the team restored some pride. After 49 years the team achieved a 0–1 win at the Santiago Bernabéu against Real Madrid, the highlight of the season. Luque's fantastic goal that night was followed by a 2–1 win at home against Getafe. Deportivo were now placed eighth in the Liga and the situation looked to change. But scoring goals remained a problem. The team survived a siege at Liverpool (0-0) and earned a late point at Málaga (1-1). Against little Cerceda (0–2) a place in the next round of the Copa del Rey was secured, but the team was out of ammunition in the next matches. The draw in Riazor against Albacete (0-0) was a poor result, but the defeat against Liverpool (0–1) was the end of the European dreams.

With Mauro Silva being out injured during many weeks of his final season, it was veteran Fran who tried to lift injury-plagued Deportivo with a goal at Barcelona. Days before he had announced his retirement at the end of the season. But it was an effort in vain because the match at the Nou Camp was lost (2–1) and three days later Elche eliminated Deportivo from the Copa del Rey (1–0). The team bounced back with wins against Levante (1–0) and a stunning one at shining Villarreal (0–2). The team had with that moved up to fifth place in the Spanish league due to the head-to-head rule, but never during this season would the team be placed higher. The end of the Champions League was humiliating with a 1–0 defeat at Olympiakos Piraeus and a 0–5 score against Monaco in Riazor. Deportivo became the first team in the history of the Champions League not to have scored a single goal in the first group phase. The first newspaper reports appeared about ‘the end of a cycle’ and the board announced no signings would be made this season after the European exit.

The surrounding three Liga matches all finished 2-2: the team threw away a 2–0 lead against Real Sociedad, earned a late draw at Racing de Santander and saw how Baptista earned Sevilla a late point in Riazor. The year ended with more drama after defeats at Atlético (1–0) and at home against Real Zaragoza (2–3). After seventeen Liga matches Deportivo were now situated at place thirteen at twenty points of leaders FC Barcelona. How things can change in just six months.

The year 2005 started with rumours about Del Bosque or Caparrós replacing Irureta at the end of the season. Deportivo threw away a lead twice at Mallorca (2-2) and did the same in Riazor against bottom-placed Numancia (1-1). Then Walter Pandiani rebelled. The Uruguayan striker called Deportivo “a sinking ship” and accused coach Javier Irureta of “washing his hands in innocence”. The team responded by defeating Espanyol 4-1 and earning a hard-fought point at Osasuna (1-1). But Pandiani had played his final minutes at the club. He was loaned out to Birmingham City for the remainder of the season and the Galicians added Fabrizio Coloccini to the squad, followed by a deal with Julián de Guzmán some days later. The Hannover midfielder would join Deportivo on a free transfer that summer.

In the Liga, the only competition left, the Galicians worked on their restoration. Deportivo had a narrow escape at home against Athlétic (1-1) but achieved an important win at 2004 champions Valencia (1–2); a sweet revenge for the humiliating September defeat in Riazor. But the ninth place of this moment would not be improved until the final day of the season. After some fresh bullets from Pandiani out of England, who kept on criticizing Irureta, the 2–0 defeat at Betis Sevilla was a setback. But this was quickly overcome with a home win against Real Madrid (2–0).

In March the Galicians earned a point at Getafe (1-1) and won their matches against Málaga (1–0) and Albacete (0–1). At just one point of a UEFA cup spot, confidence seemed to be back when FC Barcelona visited Riazor on March 19. Although the Catalans played almost the entire second half with ten men after Márquez was sent off, Giuly's early goal sealed Depor's faith (0–1). These points were retaken with a 0–1 win at Levante. But the home match against Champions League contenders Villarreal on 10 April proved to be fatal. Deportivo wasted a lead when Arzo scored the equalizer with only some minutes remaining, after full Galician domination. Deportivo remained at ninth position, at five points of a Champions League spot.

All hopes of reaching the Champions League now were gone, and a UEFA Cup spot did not seem to be the best motivation. The only positive note from the 1–0 defeat at Real Sociedad was the debut of young striker Xisco. On 24 April even these European hopes were over after a shocking 1–4 home defeat against Racing de Santander, and the possibility of playing Intertoto Cup became Depor's only realistic way to play European football. It led to an article in Depor's official newspaper stating that Irureta would not be in charge of Deportivo during the next season. Sevilla inflicted Depor's third consecutive defeat (2–0).

Some pride was restored with a 2–0 home win against Atlético, with Pedro Munitis being very lively and Xisco starting his first Liga match. It was Xisco who scored two goals at Zaragoza (2-2) one week later, but the team threw away the lead. The final match of Mauro Silva and Fran in Riazor, and wearing the shirt of Deportivo, ended in another poor result: a 0–3 home defeat against relegation-troubled Mallorca. It led to accusations of Levante of ‘Depor throwing away the match’, with the accusations specifically aimed at defender Romero. But these words were taken back quickly after the realisation set in that Deportivo simply were not motivated anymore during the final weeks of the season.

On 29 May 2005 the nightmare season ended with a 1–1 draw at already relegated Numancia. Their defender Juanpa scored Depor's goal, just enough to see the Galicians finish eighth and to qualify for Intertoto football. Deportivo finished the season with just 51 points; 20 points less compared to the previous season. It was the worst season under Irureta and the team just avoided doing worse than during the season 1997/1998. That season, the worst of the team since 1992, Deportivo ended with 49 points.

The players most frequently used that campaign were: Molina/Munúa - Romero, Jorge Andrade, César Martín/Coloccini, Manuel Pablo - Luque, Valerón, Sergio, Lionel Scaloni/Duscher, Munitis/Víctor Sánchez - Tristán/Pandiani

=== 2005/2006: Caparrós and the 'Transition Year' ===
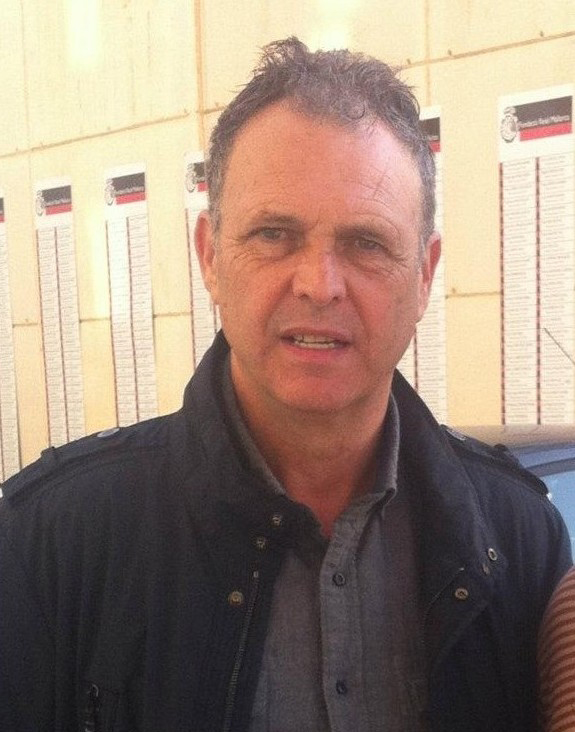
Joaquín Caparrós

In the summer of 2005, much had changed compared to the year before. Depor had missed out on European football for the first time since 1998 and two other pillars (after players like Naybet, Djalminha, Donato and Makaay in the two years before) of the period since 1992 left the club: Mauro Silva and Fran. Combined with the arrival in early June 2005 of new coach Joaquín Caparrós (from Sevilla), who is known for his capacity to work with youngsters, the biggest reconstruction since 1998 took place. Other coaches who were named as possible successors were Javier Aguirre, Ernesto Valverde, Víctor Muñoz, Vicente Del Bosque, Jose Antonio Camacho, Luis Fernández, Bernd Schuster and Marcelo Bielsa.

Deportivo had experienced some difficult seasons since 1992, like the ones of 1995/1996 and 1997/1998, but never two in a row until 2005. Besides, in those other seasons it always had qualified for European football and only in 1999 did not finish among the first three. So, Caparrós was going to fight against history, and maybe too much expectations. It's not known what kind of agreements Caparrós made with Lendoiro about the squad composition or transfer policy. But like Irureta, the Andalucian coach would have to do with limited means. Not only Mauro Silva and Fran had left Deportivo; other established names like Walter Pandiani (early August) and Albert Luque (at the end of August) would follow. Pandiani was rejected by Caparrós and Luque was sold for much-needed income. As usual, many names were related to the Galician club that summer although not the bigger ones as before; Nakamura, Javi Fuego, Tomasson, Dorashoo, Fernando Baiano, Saha, Uche, Riki, Fatih Tekke, Viduka, Carlton Cole and Marcus Bent were some of the mentioned players. But in the end, only midfielder Julián de Guzmán and defender Juanma arrived on free transfers while near the end of the transfer season unknown striker Taborda was added to the squad.

Again, the squad of Deportivo was considered to have lost qualities. But Caparrós took up the challenge and aimed at taking the maximum out of the players available. That included getting experienced ones like Tristán (who was aiming at the World Cup 2006), Víctor Sánchez and Coloccini, for example, back to their level of previous years. His plans also included to get the team hungry again and to have some talented players in the first squad. Precisely his ability to get youngsters at Primera level was one of the main reasons why Caparrós was signed by Deportivo. The financial problems of the club left it with little choice other than to start using younger players. Lendoiro explained it like this: “With some bargains and one or two good signings we built Superdepor of Arsenio (Iglesias). Later we made a big (financial) effort signing good players and we created the successful team of Irureta. Now it's time for the third part: to continue playing among the elite with players coming from Deportivo B”.

The season started quite early as for the first time Intertoto matches were on the schedule, a sideway to qualification for the UEFA Cup tournament. In the first two rounds, clubs like Buducnost (4–2 on aggregate) and Slaven (4–0 on aggregate) were beaten. Impressive were two wins against Newcastle United: both matches finished 2–1. Just one more scalp now was needed to achieve qualification: the one of Olympique Marseille. After a 2–0 win in Riazor the teams were level 1–1 in France with just 25 minutes remaining. When Marseille scored their second goal and Capdevila was sent off, the team broke down and eventually surrendered with just two minutes remaining. This match finished 5–1, although during the whole of the tournament Deportivo have given a positive impression. Striker Rubén scored four goals, defender Jorge Andrade three while youngsters Xisco and Iván Carril also found the net. Although midfielder Duscher was discarded initially by Caparrós, his fine performances during the pre-season made him an important player again. The optimistic mood was confirmed by Deportivo winning their sixth consecutive Teresa Herrera tournament (with Nacional and Peñarol as other contenders) on 15 August 2005. Rumours were spreading that Deportivo could already offer Caparrós an extension to his contract which was running for just one year until 30 June 2006.

The optimistic mood and early preparations were repaid during the month of September, when the team stayed unbeaten in five Liga minutes and were fifth at three points of surprising leaders Celta de Vigo. Depor started by winning at Mallorca (0–1), an opponent which always had been so difficult in the Irureta-years. Caparrós’ plans of using younger players were immediately revealed with the starting places of Rubén Castro (24) and Ivan Carril (21) combined with the second half entries of Senel (21) and Momo (23). Capdevila's injury-time strike earned the Galicians three points in their home match with Atlético de Madrid (1–0). In a tense match at Valencia (2-2), Depor showed to have a mature team capable of achieving a result at a difficult stadium. The draw against Betis in Riazor (1-1) might have been somewhat disappointing, but the team finished the start of the season without a defeat after the third away match. Like against Betis, the team came back from behind against Zaragoza (1-1). Tristán's header at La Romareda was already his third Liga goal of the season (after his penalty against Betis and his cool finish at Valencia). Remarkable in these matches was the important part one Argentine played (Duscher) and the absence of another, even captain of the squad: Lionel Scaloni.

October started very difficult to Caparrós’ men. On 2 October the home match against Osasuna was lost (0–1), but included the Liga debut of young playmaker Iago, and thirteen days later the team was 1–3 down at home against strong FC Barcelona just after the break. Goals of Munitis and Rubén Castro still earned the Galicians a deserved draw after an intensive fight, but the team could not repeat this when on 23 October it was 2–0 down at Real Sociedad after just twenty-four minutes. These results left Deportivo being twelfth, closer to the relegation spots (at four points) as to the first spot surprisingly occupied by Getafe (at seven points). Jorge Andrade limped off injured in the Barcelona match and would be out for a month. To the contrary, Scaloni had returned to the team in the match at Anoeta and also started the next four when Deportivo turned things around again. At home against Real Madrid (third in the table, but without Zidane, Ronaldo and Baptista) the unbeaten run against them since 1991 continued because of goals by the new signings: two by defender Juanma and one from De Guzmán. Four days later another team from the Spanish capital, second-placed Getafe, were beaten 1-0 thanks to a Tristán goal. The match at Málaga finished 1-1 because of a great equalizer of Valerón. Fourteen days after it another away match, at Racing de Santander, resulted in a 3–0 win and Deportivo occupying sixth place.

Still, after the good results at on-third of the season, there were some unhappy faces in Depor's squad. Duscher and Scaloni remained having a somewhat difficult relationship with Caparrós. Duscher kept being related to foreign clubs. Scaloni openly defended the players whose contracts were going to run out in 2006 or 2007 and asked for negotiations. César and Juanma supported him. Lendoiro responded by saying that he did not expect players to concern themselves with “managerial aspects of the club”. Meanwhile, Tristán's game kept being unconvincing after the difficulties he had in the final seasons under Irureta. He scored four goals in the first twelve Liga matches, including one penalty, but on the pitch still was not the leader Caparrós wanted him to be. In the Cádiz match several weeks later, he was criticized by the Riazor crowd from the first minute even after having scored the only goal of the match. Finally, the smooth game of the earlier years had disappeared. Deportivo now more aimed at a physical game and scored a lot of their goals out of standard plays.

On 27 November 2005 the classy team of Villarreal had outplayed Deportivo in Riazor (0–2). But the home stadium of Deportivo had lost to be the fortress it was once. For the first time in many years, Deportivo were more self-convinced playing away from home than in La Coruña itself. This probably had to do with the style it was handling: waiting for opponents to make mistakes instead of being more creative themselves. That tactic proved to be a success in the next three matches: away to Sevilla and Celta and home to newly promoted Cádiz. In Sevilla, the referee booked a total of twelve players and gave red cards to two Sevilla players. Effective Deportivo took advantage of by scoring two goals (0–2). One week later, the team again did not play impressive but secured three important points at home against Cádiz (1–0) thanks to, as mentioned earlier, a goal of Diego Tristán.

When the Christmas break approached, there was overall satisfaction though about the way Deportivo was evolving. One of the highlights of the season will have been the away match with Celta de Vigo (seventh placed) on 17 December 2005. In the days before, Caparrós extended his contract for two more years to 2008 and Deportivo signed talented striker Javier Arizmendi from Atlético de Madrid (taking Momo's place). It became an excellent week when during the Galician derby Deportivo quickly took control. After initial pressure from the home side, Celta's goalkeeper Pinto was sent off and Diego Tristán converted the following penalty kick. Goals of Valerón and Capdevila before the break clinically finished off Celta to make the final score 0–3. Deportivo now shared third Liga spot with Real Madrid, Villarreal and Valencia. It seemed as the glory days of the Irureta-era were returning. Considering the loss of many important players in the previous two-and-a-half years, that meant an enormous achievement.

But it was not supposed to be like that. Still in 2005, Deportivo lost another home match, this time against Espanyol (1–2) who played almost all of the second half with ten men. At least Tristán's late goal gave him a total of eight and made him the best Spanish striker after Valencia's David Villa, which could mean a boost to the striker. Besides, young striker Xisco was used for the first time by Caparrós. Depor's Copa del Rey home match against Osasuna (3–0), who were second placed in the Liga, was impressive, but one has to keep in mind that the team from Navarra missed many several key players, rotated others and had their share of chances. In the Liga there was another away victory for the effective Galicians: 1–2 at Athletic Bilbao. It was now 7 January 2006, with Deportivo higher placed in the Liga than Real Madrid, Villarreal and Sevilla and very well alive in the Copa del Rey. The pass to the next round was sealed after a minimal defeat in Pamplona (1–2). The next opponent would be arch-rivals Valencia and in the Liga there was a good opportunity to take points in Riazor from relegation-troubled Alavés and Mallorca. The future looked good.

However, in January the season became more difficult. With Capdevila, Jorge Andrade and Munitis suspended, and Valerón rested, Alavés took three points from Riazor by winning 0–2, including a goal of their striker Bodoipo (who would join Deportivo after this season). The team did not needed much motivation when Valencia played in Riazor for the Copa del Rey, and a late penalty kick of Sergio decided the match in Depor's favour (1–0). It confirmed Depor's image as a tough, result-orientated team, which was at its best when opponents were assumed to be superior. But the other side of the mirror was confirmed once more in the Liga home match against troubled Mallorca. The score sheet during the break, with Valerón and Tristán on it, reminded of the old days. But just ten minutes after the restart, Mallorca were level again and took a point away from Riazor (2-2). The Galicians had only been able to win four out of eleven matches in Riazor, and again their game was unconvincing. What might have decided the rest of the season was the major knee injury playmaker Valerón suffered near the end of this match. He would be out for the rest of the season 2005/2006 and this eliminated even more creative qualities of the team.

The slip of Deportivo in the Liga table towards sixth spot was followed by the always tense (Copa) match at Mestalla against Valencia where the Galicians defended their 1–0 win from the first match. The start of the match resembled much the Supercopa confrontation between the two sides in August 2002 when Deportivo defended a 3–0 lead and a hyper-motivated saw Ayala being sent-off in the initial phase after elbowing Depor's striker Makaay. This time Marchena found Arizmendi as his target and the home side were down to ten men. Their players and supporters got even more heated up, but still Valencia scored the first goal of the match near the break. However, quickly after it one of the referee's assistants was hit with a coin coming from the crowd and the match was suspended for that night. Another chapter in the rivalry between Deportivo and Valencia, dating back to 1994, had opened. The RFEF, the Spanish, rather quickly decided that the match had to be continued, in an empty Mestalla, where it had stopped. But Deportivo president Lendoiro appealed to that decision at the Consejo Superior de Deportes (CSD).

That same week strong rumours appeared about a move of Víctor Sánchez, who had not finished a Liga match until then, to Liverpool FC. It was a choice for Deportivo to still get some money now, because Víctor's contract was going to run out a few months later (like the contracts of Molina and César Martín), or to use the winger for the final part of the season. In the Liga itself, a win at Atlético was Depor's aim to make it five in a row in away matches (which would mean a record in Depor's history). Until then it had been a weird season with Deportivo only taking fifteen points out of eleven home matches but eighteen points out of nine away matches. However, one way or the other, the Galicians were heading towards qualification for European football and had a good chance of reaching the next phase in the Copa del Rey.

At Atlético, the team came back from behind twice after a terrible first half, but ten minutes before the end of the match still capitulated (3–2). That week, Víctor Sánchez even already had his personal terms agreed with Liverpool when near the transfer market deadline the deal was off. Shocking news was the loan out of Lionel Scaloni, at the club since January 1998, to English side West Ham United. He was replaced with a loan deal concerning Sevilla winger Francisco Gallardo. In court, the CSD rejected Depor's appeal and so did an ordinary justice court, meaning that the match would be continued on 1 February 2006. Again, this reminded on an earlier match against Valencia as in 1995 the final of the Copa del Rey had to be continued several days later after heavy rain. But in the end all worked out well when in this restarted match, youngster Senel was pushed to the ground with twenty minutes remaining and Victór Sánchez, who almost had worn the red and white of Liverpool, sentenced the Copa round from the spot (1-1).

Valencia had their revenge three days later when Deportivo suffered their second Liga defeat in a row and their fifth in total in Riazor (0–1). Villa's goal gave Valencia the lead when history of the days before seemed to repeat itself: Víctor Sánchez had a chance from the penalty shot to equalize. The winger missed though, and also missed the retry which the referee had ordered, meaning that Deportivo slipped away to eighth spot in the Liga. From the transfer market it was rumoured that Deportivo already had agreed terms with Málaga midfielder Juan Rodríguez and defender Lopo (Espanyol). They would join Deportivo on a free transfer in June. Precisely the Catalans were Depor's opponents in the next Copa round, starting at the Montjuic. After four minutes Rubén's penalty kick gave Depor the lead and the team seemed to be heading towards the final of the Copa del Rey. But after the break Espanyol equalized from the spot and suddenly the Galicians were down to ten men when Coloccini was sent off. The team hung on the draw when near the end it was Walter Pandiani, back in Spain after his spell at Birmingham City, gave the home side the victory (2–1).

Now the season of Deportivo was becoming more difficult and the team had to react at Betis Sevilla. Although the home side dominated that match, Rubén's goal near the end earned Depor three valuable points. Despite this result, there remained unrest in the squad and striker Diego Tristán had a row with Caparrós. He had scored just one goal in the past eleven matches (Copa included) and still had failed to impress. Caparrós had been making many changes in his line-ups until that moment, and the team had even more troubles being creative with the absence of Valerón; many goals kept coming out of standard plays. Usually, good results are always the best medicine for a team facing difficulties. But again the team could not win at home: this time against Zaragoza (1-1), thanks to fine saves of Molina, with another sending-off of Coloccini. On 26 February 2006, the team was eight again in the Liga and had to travel to Pamplona to meet fourth-placed Osasuna. The team were 1–0 down when during the break Diego Tristán entered the match. After the break, it was Sergio who equalized and the Andalucian striker earned Deportivo another away win (2–1).

But it remained a season of ups and downs, of highlights and drama; of optimism and pessimism, of losing ‘easy’ matches and winning unexpectedly. For example, Deportivo did pretty well at the Nou Camp and were leading with two goals against one after half an hour. Another away victory, this time against the mighty Liga leaders and with it a return to the European spots, looked possible. However, after ninety minutes the score-board reflected a 3–2 loss and defender Jorge Andrade was diagnosed to be out for the rest of the season, including the World Cup 2006. One week later, seventeenth-placed Real Sociedad looked to be the ideal candidate for Deportivo to achieve their first home win of the year 2006 against. But again there was only frustration after ninety minutes: 0–1. Three days later the balsam of the season, the Copa del Rey, was restarted again with the Semifinal second leg against Espanyol. It was the final blow to Depor's aspirations as once again the team lacked being creative enough upfront against Lotina's men: 0-0. It was 15 March 2007: the team now was out of the Copa del Rey, ninth in the Liga and had to finish the season without Valerón and Jorge Andrade.

The season existed of small episodes of positive and negative results. After the next four Liga matches there would be some renewed optimism, although the team performance kept being unconvincing. Getafe had the best of their home match against Deportivo, but the Galicians left their stadium with three points (1–2). Against relegation-troubled Málaga at home, the team were down until Víctor Sánchez scored two goals out of free-kicks (2–1). After these two hard-fought wins, Deportivo were back in the race for European football at sixth spot. At the Bernabéu it's no shame for a team as Deportivo to lose, but the Galicians were disastrous and left the pitch with a hopeless 4–0 final score; the biggest loss at the Bernabéu since Depor's return to the elite. However, Deportivo kept bouncing way and back and secured their second consecutive home win against Racing de Santander (2–0). The team was still knocking on the door of European football and kept all options intact.

It was not to be though. First, news reports appeared about Caparrós having arguments with club president Lendoiro with the coach threatening to leave in June. Caparrós was still unhappy that when the season started he still had to work with an overcrowded squad, leaving not much space for youngsters in this season. Also, the fact that he did not was consulted on Scaloni's loan move had hurt the coach. More important, it looked likely that Molina and Víctor Sánchez were going to leave Deportivo within three months (both were out of contract) because of their high salaries. The same was said about Duscher (only one year of contract left) and Jorge Andrade. Also, Caparrós was not completely happy with the way daily business was run at Depor's training centre at Abegondo concerning the youth teams. Finally, Caparrós had been expecting creative winger Mark González of Liverpool but in the end this deal collapsed because of minimal financial differences. Now, with Deportivo being unimpressive and troubled in the Liga, the bubble started to burst. It led to a press conference where the full board of Deportivo responded to the situation. After it winger Víctor Sánchez gave his version of his possible contract renewal and blamed the club.

It cannot be made clear what influence all this had on the performances of the team. But within the space of five weeks, the final part of the season, it threw away all options of European football by winning just one match. A point at Villarreal (1-1) is always useful (although the Galicians threw away a lead). At home against Sevilla, the 0–0 draw was reasonable because Deportivo had half their squad out injured or sick. Both concerned direct rivals though: Sevilla, Deportivo and Villarreal now occupied places six to eight with last two mentioned teams being subscribed for Intertoto football (Spain had only one place available). In Cádiz two vital points were lost when the home side scored a late equalizer against nine players of Deportivo (De Guzmán and Manuel Pablo were sent off).

On 30 April 2006 it was going to be all or nothing against Celta de Vigo. The regional rivals occupied the first UEFA Cup spot, at five points of Deportivo, and sixth-placed Sevilla were at just one point. History gave the home side courage because Celta had not won in Riazor for twelve years. But it became a very painful night in La Coruña. The home side needed the three points, and after Celta's goal after thirty-four minutes knew that scoring two goals had been very difficult this season. Frustration is the word best used for the final part of the match when Deportivo simply did not seem capable of turning the match around. First, Coloccini was sent off once more. After it, Celta scored their second goal and in the end celebrated their win in front of faces full of disbelief. UEFA Cup football now was four points away, but at least Intertoto rival Villarreal was two points below Deportivo.

Four days later nothing changed in the table after Deportivo defeated Espanyol at the Montjuic (1–2). It was close call though because the relegation-troubled home side were 1–0 up with fifteen minutes remaining, when substitute Iván Carril first equalized himself and near the end provided Tristán a perfect cross to sentence the match. It was Depor's ninth away win in a season, a record. With two matches against other relegation-troubled clubs remaining, at least Intertoto football now seemed secured. Especially after Deportivo were leading 1–0 against Athletic Bilbao with twenty minutes remaining. But at the end of this match, Athletic was celebrating like Celta had done one week earlier (1–2). It was a painful final home match of the season which reflected the poor home record of the team.

Now there was another bomb burst. Disappointed about this result, Caparrós said on local radio: "I don't know if I have the drive to lead a new project at Deportivo." A phrase that has been understood as his desire for leaving the club. But on the next day he changed his declarations. The Sevillan coach assured that he still has “the illusion to direct the club" and also mentioned that he sees himself “directing Deportivo during the pre-season". Osasuna, who knew that their coach Javier Aguirre was going to Atlético de Madrid, openly flirted with the coach, but at a press conference president Lendoiro warned them to stay away.

It looked like the season was already over, but the team still had to defend their lead (reduced to one point) over Villarreal for Spain's Intertoto spot at Alavés, who themselves desperately needed to win to avoid relegation. So it became another interesting night. But after an hour, Deportivo were in trouble because Villarreal we’re leading 2–0 at home against Racing de Santander meaning that the Galicians needed to win their match. That task became impossible when with twelve minutes remaining, Alavés’ striker Bodipo scored his second goal against Depor that season and at that moment kept his side in the Primera División (1–0). After it, Deportivo were powerless and knew that the season were over. But Alavés too ended with a deception, when Espanyol saved themselves in injury-time against Real Sociedad and Alavés still were relegated.

The season had been a long and suffering one, when on 14 May 2006 it was over. Like in 1994, Deportivo finished disappointingly. But compared to twelve years before, when a last-minute penalty-miss of Djukic made Deportivo losing the Liga title but still sharing first place, the future now looked more difficult. It's debatable whether the season was a success or a failure. Probably it was something between. On the bright side: Deportivo had equalled the year before but with less qualities. Away from home the team achieved marvellous results. A handful of younger players had entered the team. A player liked Pedro Munitis was excellent and so was Duscher, who did not seem to count anymore one year before. A positive surprise also was Juanma; he started twenty-two Liga matches and even scored four goals.

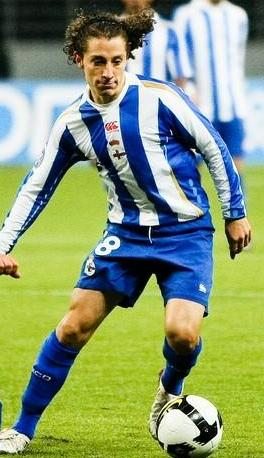
Andrés Guardado played for Deportivo between 2007 and 2012.

== 2006 onwards: Deterioration and relegation ==
During the second half of the decade the squad weakened and Deportivo became a mid-table team. In 2011 Deportivo was relegated to the second division, just to immediately obtain promotion in 2012. However, on the last matchday of the 2012-13 the club was once again relegated. In December 2012 it was announced Deportivo was about to declare state of insolvency. In December 2013 Lendoiro announced he would not seek reelection thus ending an uninterrupted 25-year reign. In 2014 Deportivo earned promotion on the 41st matchday.
