= José María Abalo =

Spanish football pioneer

Personal information
- Full name: José María Abalo Abad
- Date of birth: 1884
- Place of birth: Vilagarcía de Arousa, Pontevedra, Spain
- Date of death: 1 September 1954 (aged 69–70)
- Position: Forward

Senior career*
Years	Team	Apps	(Gls)
1901–1903	Club Alfonso XII		
1903–1906	Coruña FC		
1906–1907	Vigo Sporting		
- * Club domestic league appearances and goals

José María Abalo Abad (1884 – 1 September 1954), was a Spanish footballer who played as a forward for Sporting de Vigo and later worked as a referee. He was one of the most important figures in the amateur beginnings of football in Galicia, being noted for his prominent role in promoting football in the city and for founding the first football clubs in the region, such as Football Corunna Club.

== Early life and education ==
Abalo was born in 1884 in Vilagarcía de Arousa, Pontevedra, and as the son of a wealthy industrialist from Vilagarcía, he was sent to London to complete his studies, doing so in an English boarding school. During his years in Britain, he developed a deep interest in football, and when he returned to Galicia in 1901, he did so not only with a university degree in commerce, but also with a ball in his suitcase.

Abalo took the ball with him when he went to the School of Commerce in Coruña, and he quickly spread his passion to his classmates since every day, in the intermediate hours from class to class, they ran around the Estrada field, kicking the ball. In 1901, in one of their gatherings, at the Café Universal, they decided to establish a club, which they named Club Alfonso XII, which was the very first football society in A Coruña and Galicia. The new club adopted the regulations of the British Football Association and began training at El Relleno, a landfill area near the sea.

== Football career ==
=== Founding Coruña FC ===
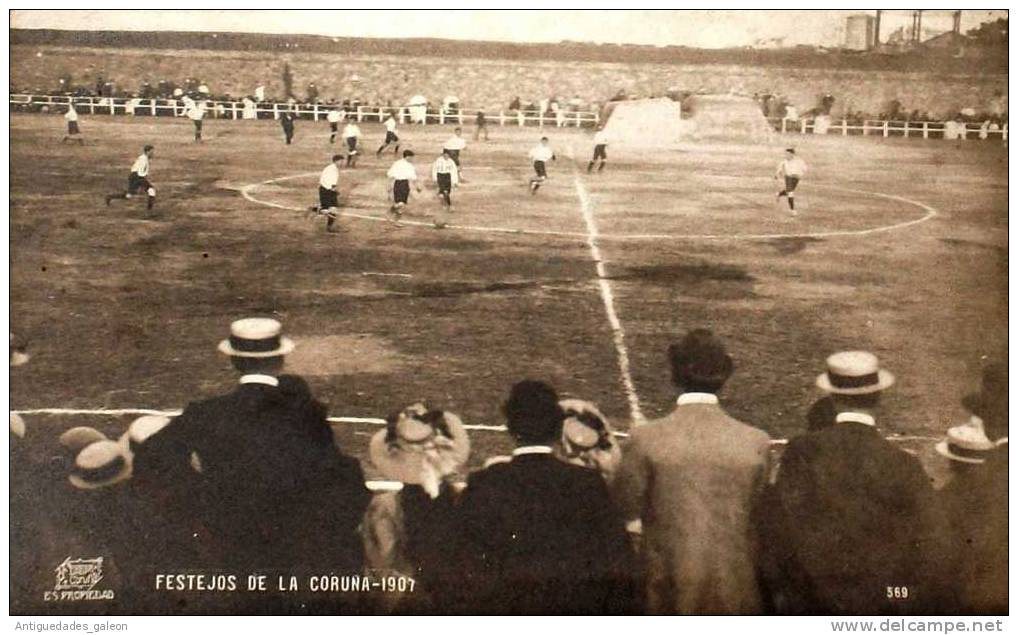
A football match in Corralón da Gaiteira in 1907

Abalo settled in Coruña, where he tried to make football known as a sport among the young people of the city, teaching football to the youth and organizing the first football matches in the region, most of which between locals. The sport began to take root in the city and kept growing to the point that in 1903, some young people from the Sala de armas Calvet, a gym that was then directed by the fencing champion Federico Calvet, began deserting it to follow Abalo in football practice. Later that same year, this group of football pioneers led by Abalo founded the Foot-ball Corunna Club, the first club in the region. Initially, the club played in white or red, and sometimes on an entirely white uniform, but it later adopted a yellow and black striped shirt and white pants, with which the team appeared on 20 March 1904 at the albero of the Herculina Bullring in the Plaza de Toros in a match against a team known as Diligent, which was made up of members of the officers of two British steamships. This was the first serious and proper football match in the city and it was surprisingly won 3–0 by the locals who, buoyed by their success, both sporting and social, continued to play meetings against the officers of the ships that docked at the Port of A Coruña. The popularity of football in La Coruña kept growing to the point that the Bullring soon became too small for this group of football pioneers, so they moved to the grounds of the so-called Corralón da Gaiteira ("Piper's Yard") were soon enabled as a permanent football field, the first of such in La Coruña.

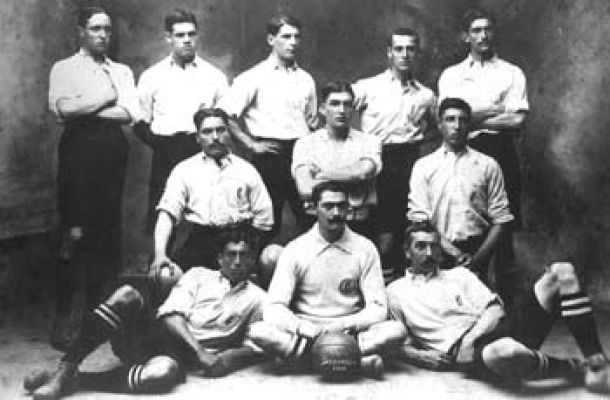
Deportivo Sala Calvet in 1908

The members of the Sala Calvet who had participated in the constitution of Corunna FC and the recently created Club Naútico followed Abalo's example and recruited a large group of players for the Calvet's gym, and thus the Sala Calvet Sports Club was born. Not without effort, since getting it started required a dispute between the rowing section and the football section to know which of the two was the most complete sport. It was settled in a match between the two at the Corralón de la Gaiteira and, as night fell without a goal having been scored, they decided to continue the match the next day, on 1 March 1906, which was won 1–0 by the Deportivistas. In December 1906, members of Sala Calvet gymnasium formed Deportivo de La Coruña, naming Luis Cornide as the first president.

=== Playing career ===
In the 1906–07 season, Abalo played as a forward in Sporting de Vigo, scoring twice in the 1907 Copa del Rey, including a late winner against the eventual runner-ups Club Bizcaya. Back in Vilagarcía, Abalo continued his efforts in favor of this sport until he achieved the formation of Villagarcia FC in 1907, which in the same year of its constitution was invited by Madrid FC to "take part in a training match".

=== Refereeing career ===
After retiring, Abalo became a football referee, and although he had a short-lived career as such, he oversaw one Copa del Rey final, the most important match in Spanish football at the time, of the 1908 edition between Madrid FC and his former team Vigo Sporting, which ended in a 1–2 loss to Vigo.

== Later life and death ==
In the following years, Abalo continued practicing this new sport, even alternating between football and rugby in the fields of Santa Rita and A Lomba, "witnessed by a large audience". Abalo died on 1 September 1954, at the age of either 69 or 70.
