= Port of A Coruña =

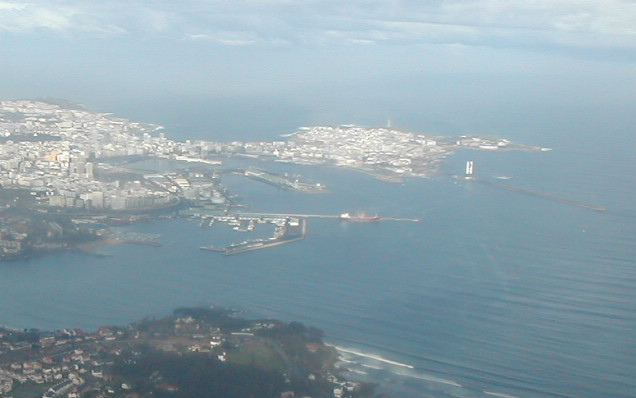
- Boats at the port
- Interactive map of Port of A Coruña

Location
- Country: Spain
- Location: A Coruña
- Coordinates: 43°21′31″N 08°23′30″W
- UN/LOCODE: ESLCG

Details
- Land area: 8.456 metres
- Draft depth: 16.5 metres (54 ft)

Statistics
- Website www.puertocoruna.com

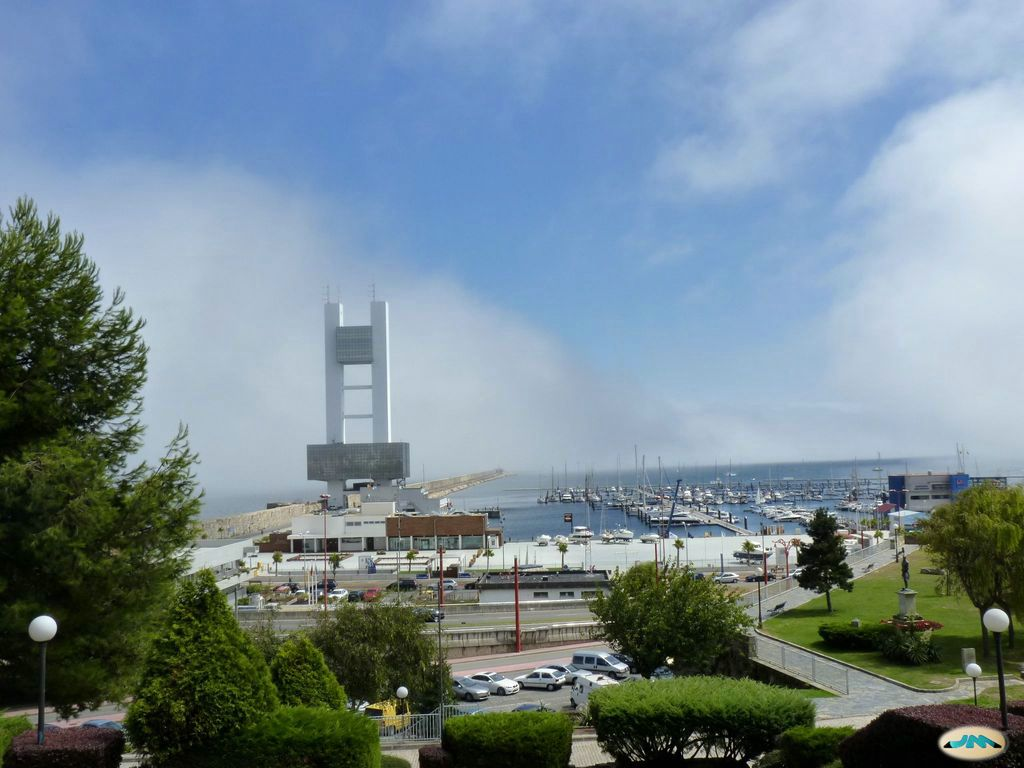
Maritime traffic control tower

The Port of A Coruña is a port in A Coruña, Spain, on the Atlantic Ocean. The port complex occupies 1.15 km² of land and 9.94 km^{2} of water along 7 km of waterfront.

== Docks ==
The Port of A Coruña has 8,458 metres (27,749 ft)² for the different services:

- 4,230 metres (13,880 ft) in the commercial docks
- 2,954 metres (9,692 ft) in the fishing basins
- 1,274 metres (4,180 ft) in the Marina and Antedársena basins.
