= Luis Cornide =

Spanish businessman, politician, and sports leader

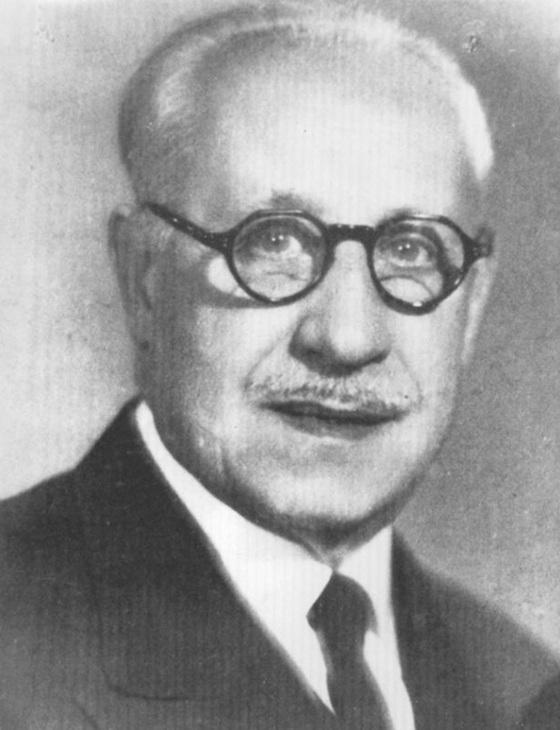
- Born: Luis Cornide Quiroga; 1884; Monforte de Lemos, Galicia, Spain
- Died: 4 November 2002 (aged 117–118); Madrid, Spain
- Citizenship: Spanish
- Occupations: Lawyer: Academic; Businessman; Politician; Sports leader
- Known for: 1st President of Deportivo de La Coruña

1st President of Deportivo de La Coruña
- In office 2 March 1906 – 28 March 1908
- Succeeded by: Laureano Martínez

Luis Cornide Quiroga (1884 – 6 November 1946) was a Spanish lawyer, academic, businessman, politician, and sports leader who served as the 1st president of Deportivo de La Coruña between 1906 and 1908. He was a Deputy of Spain for A Coruña on two occasions in the 1930s, and was later persecuted by the Franco regime, being sentenced to 12 years in prison.

== Early life and education ==
Born in 1884 in Monforte de Lemos, Galicia, Cornide first studied at the Escolapios school, but after his father died, the family moved to A Coruña, thanks to the help of a relative who was a magistrate.

He completed his high school studies at the Eusebio da Guarda Institute, and then graduated in Law from the University of Santiago de Compostela, which allowed him to become a lawyer in Coruña, entering the Corps of court and judicial clerks, where he served as a secretary of the Regional Court in 1906. Initially, however, this position was contested by his rival and fellow lawyer, Alejandro Pardo Laborde, who went as far as to issue a claim to the Contentious Court, which was ultimately rejected, and while Pardo's lawsuit was being resolved, the local press agreed with the court's decision.

In 1900, the 16-year-old Cornide became president of the Tunas de Santiago, coinciding with the time that Casa de la Troya was typed by Alejandro Pérez Lugín, who described Cornide as "a slave to books and constant discourse", and as having "as much heart as head".

== Sporting career ==
In 1903, the 19-year-old Cornide became the secretary of the League of Friends of La Coruña, which organized boat races between its members and those of the Sala Calvet, a gymnasium for the practice of various exercises, such as rowing, fencing, tennis, weightlifting, and football. On 2 March 1906, Cornide, together with members of the Sala Calvet gymnasium, founded the forerunner of Deportivo de La Coruña, being then named as the club's first president, a position that he held for two years, until 1908, when he was replaced by Laureano Martínez Brañas. On 11 March 1907, the statutes and regulations of Deportivo were approved by the civil governor, and in the following year, in late 1908, King Alfonso XIII accepted the club's honorary presidency and granted it the title of Real ("Royal"). Under his leadership, the club moved to Estadio Riazor, a sports ground with 18,000 square meters and a capacity of 6,000 fans.

== Business career ==
A prominent businessman in the electrical sector, Cornide was a director of the General Galician Society of Electricity, and a president of both the Fábricas Coruñesas de Gas y Electricidad and the Compañía Madrileña de Alumbrado y Calefacción por Gas.

In the early 1910s, Cornide established a law firm in Hercules, where he quickly earned a strong reputation. On 19 April 1918, Cornide, together with several prominent figures of Coruña, created the Patronage of Charity, an institution with the aim of putting an end to street begging in Hercules. He also collaborated with the newspaper La Voz de Galicia and in 1927, he was president of El Eco Choral Society.

== Academic career ==
Cornide was also a member of the Royal Galician Academy, and in 1934, he underwent lectures of the Economical National Union of Madrid, at the end of which he wrote La economía gallega y la solidaridad económica nacional ("The Galician economy and national economic solidarity").

== Political career ==
Politically active, Cornide was part of the Grupo de Acción Republicana and won a seat in the Cortes as an independent liberal during the general elections of June 1931. As a member of the Finance Committee, he played a key role in the discussions about the banking regulation bill. During this Republican period, he formed close ties with several influential figures, particularly the socialist leader Indalecio Prieto. During the Second Spanish Republic, Cornide was one of five politicians who had presided a football club, the others being Sevilla's Manuel Blasco, Real Madrid's Rafael Sánchez Guerra, FC Barcelona's Josep Sunyol, and RCD Mallorca's Ángel Vázquez Humasqué.

In February 1934, after winning the corresponding competition, Cornide was appointed vice-secretary of the Supreme Court, and a few months later, he became its secretary. During the build-up for the 1936 Spanish general election, Cornide was stabbed in the streets of A Coruña by Communist Party members, but he survived and went on to be re-elected as a member of the Cortes for A Coruña, once again as an independent. When the Spanish Civil War broke out on 18 July 1936, he was in Madrid, where he faced ongoing harassment from communist and anarchist groups, but eventually, Prieto secured him a safe-conduct pass that allowed him to leave the country, spending some time in exile before returning to his homeland in July 1938.

Soon after, however, Cornide was accused of the crime of "aiding rebellion", being arrested and tried by a court-martial, but thanks to his high rank, the trial, which took place on 12 August, was conducted by senior military officers, and its proceedings, which were held in the courtroom of the Infantry Regiment, were presided over by the local military governor, while his defense was led by Infantry Commander Ángel Lloveres. He was sentenced to 12 years in prison, but he was released after only a year in the Dueso Prison in Santoña, being reinstated in his professional career, and then relocated to Madrid.

== Death ==
At the time of his death on 6 November 1946, Cornide was serving as the secretary of government of the Supreme Court. He was also the uncle of Enrique Cornide Ferrant, a renowned Coruña-based lawyer and writer.
