= Federico Calvet =

Spanish athlete and gymnastics educator

- Born: Federico Fernández-Amor Calvet; 1871; A Coruña, Galicia, Spain
- Died: 5 September 1933 (aged 61–62); A Coruña, Galicia, Spain
- Citizenship: Spanish
- Occupations: Athlete; Gymnastics educator
- Known for: Founder of Deportivo de La Coruña

Federico Fernández-Amor Calvet (1871 – 5 September 1933) was a Spanish athlete and gymnastics educator who founded his gymnasium, Sala Calvet, in the 1880s, where he went on to found Deportivo de La Coruña in 1906.

== Sporting career ==
=== Multi-athlete ===
Federico Calvet was born in 1871 in A Coruña, and began practicing fencing in his youth, being a student of the Florentine professor Attilio Pontinari (master among others of Valle-Inclán), who had settled in A Coruña and created a school for talented gymnasts, the sport to which he would end up dedicating his entire life. Calvet was also part of the Circle of Artisans, participating in some of their shows.

On 3 January 1902, the 31-year-old Calvet inaugurated Sala Calvet, a gymnasium located in Galera da Coruña Street, and it immediately achieved prestige and popularity, becoming an alternative to the select Sporting Club or the Club Náutico due to being more affordable for the people of A Coruña. There, he began giving classes in fencing, gymnastics, and weightlifting, but having a good eye for business, Calvet soon expanded the program to more disciplines, such as rowing and trawler regattas, as well as tennis and cycling, plus Swedish gymnastics classes at home for ladies. His success in all disciplines was such that there was no competition in which his athletes were not present. Furthermore, he gave free gymnastics classes to the city's municipal fire department and instructed the army in the use of the sword, being decorated with the Military Merit First Class Cross with white badge.

In an advertising paper dating to 4 August 1907, it is stated that "the students who attend them will receive the hygienic gymnastics classes applied to combat a countless number of diseases and illnesses that only by this procedure are cured, and also the various sports classes, which are practiced, under the direction of its owner Mr. Federico Fernández A. Calvet, professor of Gymnastics and Fencing".

=== Deportivo da Coruña ===
Football began taking root in the city in the 1890s, and soon it gained followers among members belonging to the Sala Calvet, where Calvet was introduced to football by his younger students. As a lover of sport and physical culture, he also began practicing this new sport at the Corralón da gaiteira, after its owner, Eduardo del Río y Santos-Lartaud, gave his approval so that the Sala Calvet athletes could train and play matches there. In 1906, his students recruited a large group of players for the fencing master's gym, where they, together with Calvet, founded the Sports Club of Sala Calvet, which would later be called Real Club Deportivo da Coruña. Its first president was Luis Cornide, when he was only 24 years old. This club participated in numerous sports competitions during its first years, such as fencing, traîñeiras, tennis, and cycling, but it stood out especially for its football section.

When Corralón da gaiteira became too small due to the increase of fans, they turned to Calvet, who financed the construction of the Campo de Riazor, inaugurated in 1909, where Deportivo played until 1944.

== Personal life ==
Calvet married Marcelina Sar Varela and the couple had three children, Federico, Doroteo, and Carolina Fernández Sar, the latter deceased in 1905 at the age of just 10. His firstborn became one of the most emblematic characters of life in A Coruña in the 40s and 50s, holding several positions in the social, sporting, and commercial fields.

== Death and legacy ==
Calvet committed suicide on 5 September 1933, at the age of 62, shooting himself in the chest with a shotgun.

On 9 June 2016, the Honors and Distinctions Commission of the City Council of A Coruña agreed on a total of 22 names to be incorporated into the A Coruña street map, among which Calvet was included.
