= 1994–95 FC Barcelona season =

96th season in existence of FC Barcelona

FC Barcelona
1994–95 season
- President: Josep Lluís Núñez
- Head Coach: Johan Cruyff
- Stadium: Camp Nou
- La Liga: 4th (in 1995-96 UEFA Cup)
- Copa del Rey: Round of 16
- UEFA Champions League: Quarter-finals
- Supercopa de España: Winners
- Top goalscorer: League: Jordi Cruyff; Hristo Stoichkov, Ronald Koeman (9); All: Hristo Stoichkov (17)
Home colours	Away colours	Third colours

The club played in the 1994-95 season in La Liga, Copa del Rey and UEFA Champions League.

== Summary ==
During summer Johan Cruyff asked for the transfers out of several players such as: Goalkeeper Andoni Zubizarreta, Forwards Julio Salinas and Jon Andoni Goikoetxea. Meanwhile Michael Laudrup left the team and signed with archrivals Real Madrid. Also, Cruyff made a bid on Benfica midfielder Rui Costa without enough support by the club and failed to buy the portuguese youngstar who was transferred out to Fiorentina. The failed transfer opened the arrival of midfielder Gheorghe Hagi to replace the spot left by Laudrup. Central-back Abelardo Fernández arrived from Sporting Gijon to reinforce the defensive line.

FC Barcelona did not repeat its successful season in 1993–94, and fell back to fourth in La Liga, as well as knocked out of the Champions League in the quarter-finals by Paris Saint-Germain.

Barcelona did not perform well in the mid season and lost the league title to Real Madrid by 10 points behind included an humiliating defeat by 0–5 in Madrid, despite this Johan Cruyff was not let go by the club, taking over to the 1995–96 season.

The side won the Supercopa by defeating 1994 Copa del Rey winners Real Zaragoza.

Romário left the club in January transferred out to Flamengo. At the end of the season Hristo Stoichkov was transferred out to Parma and Ronald Koeman left the club after 5 seasons.

== Squad ==
Correct as of 23 October 2009. Note: Flags indicate national team as defined under FIFA eligibility rules; some limited exceptions apply. Players may hold more than one non-FIFA nationality.

No.	Pos.	Nation	Player
—	GK	ESP	Carles Busquets
—	GK	ESP	Jesús Angoy
—	GK	ESP	Julen Lopetegui
—	DF	ESP	Albert Ferrer
—	DF	ESP	Abelardo Fernández
—	DF	NED	Ronald Koeman
—	DF	ESP	Miguel Ángel Nadal
—	DF	ESP	Sergi Barjuán
—	DF	ESP	Francisco Javier Sánchez Jara
—	DF	ESP	Gonzalo Sanchez Moreno
—	MF	ESP	Albert Celades
—	MF	ESP	Óscar Arpón
—	MF	ESP	Cembranos
—	MF	ESP	Eusebio Sacristan

No.	Pos.	Nation	Player
—	MF	ESP	Guillermo Amor (vice-Captain)
—	MF	ESP	Pep Guardiola (vice-Captain)
—	MF	ESP	José Mari Bakero (Captain)
—	MF	ESP	Iván Iglesias
—	MF	ROU	Gheorghe Hagi
—	MF	ESP	Xabier Eskurza
—	MF	ESP	José Mari
—	MF	ESP	Roger García
—	FW	ESP	Aitor Begiristain
—	FW	BUL	Hristo Stoichkov
—	FW	NED	Jordi Cruyff
—	FW	BRA	Romário
—	FW	RUS	Igor Korneev
—	FW	ESP	Xavier Escaich

=== Transfers ===
In
Pos.	Name	from	Type
MF	Gheorghe Hagi	Brescia Calcio	
DF	Abelardo	Sporting Gijon	
FW	Jordi Cruijff		
GK	Julen Lopetegui	Logroñes CF	
DF	Xabier Eskurza	Athletic Bilbao	
MF	José Mari	Osasuna	
FW	Xavier Escaich	Sporting Gijon	
DF	Sanchez Jara	Osasuna	
FW	Igor Korneev		
FW	Roger García		
MF	Luis Cembranos		
MF	Óscar Arpón		
DF	Gonzalo Sanchez Moreno		

Out
Pos.	Name	To	Type
GK	Andoni Zubizarreta	Valencia CF	-
FW	Michael Laudrup	Real Madrid	-
FW	Julio Salinas	Deportivo	-
FW	Jon Goikoetxea	Athletic Bilbao	-
FW	Goran Vučević	Hadjuk Split	loan
FW	Oscar	Albacete	loan
FW	Quique Estebaranz	Sevilla CF	-
MF	Ronnie Ekelund	Southampton FC	loan
DF	Juan Carlos	Valencia CF	-

==== Winter ====
In
Pos.	Name	from	Type

Out
Pos.	Name	To	Type
FW	Romário	CR Flamengo	loan

== Competitions ==
=== La Liga ===
==== League table ====
Pos	Team	Pld	W	D	L	GF	GA	GD	Pts	Qualification or relegation
2	Deportivo La Coruña	38	20	11	7	68	32	+36	51	Qualification for the Cup Winners' Cup first round (Note: Deportivo entered UEFA Cup Winners' Cup as winners of 1994–95 Copa del Rey.)
3	Real Betis	38	15	16	7	46	25	+21	46 (Note: BAR 1–1 BET; BET 1–1 BAR)	Qualification for the UEFA Cup first round
4	Barcelona	38	18	10	10	60	45	+15	46	Qualification for the UEFA Cup first round
5	Sevilla (Note: On July 31, 1995, Sevilla and Celta Vigo were relegated to Segunda División B for not providing documentation (an audit) nor making their payments to the Royal Spanish Football Federation within the time limit. The two best qualified teams to be relegated, Albacete and Valladolid were readmitted to La Liga. Later, Sevilla and Celta Vigo claimed that according to the law they had another 15 working days because they made allegations days before. Finally, the solution was to not relegate any involved team and expand the league to 22 teams for the next two seasons.)	38	16	11	11	55	41	+14	43 (Note: SEV: 7 pts; ESP: 3 pts; ZAR: 2 pts)	Qualification for the UEFA Cup first round
6	Espanyol (Note: RCD Español was renamed RCD Espanyol in February 1995.)	38	14	15	9	51	35	+16	43	

Source: LFP
Rules for classification: 1) points; 2) head-to-head points; 3) head-to-head goal difference; 4) head-to-head goals scored; 5) goal difference; 6) number of goals scored.

==== Results by round ====
Round	1	2	3	4	5	6	7	8	9	10	11	12	13	14	15	16	17	18	19	20	21	22	23	24	25	26	27	28	29	30	31	32	33	34	35	36	37	38
Ground	A	H	A	H	A	H	A	H	A	H	A	H	H	A	H	A	H	A	H	H	A	H	A	H	A	H	A	H	A	H	A	A	H	A	H	A	H	A
Result	L	W	D	W	L	W	W	W	D	W	W	L	D	W	D	L	W	D	W	W	L	W	W	W	L	D	L	D	D	W	L	L	D	D	W	W	L	W
Position	15	9	9	6	9	7	5	4	4	4	3	4	4	4	4	4	4	4	3	3	3	3	2	2	2	2	3	3	3	3	3	5	5	5	3	3	4	4

Source: Competitive matches
A = Away; H = Home; W = Win; D = Draw; L = Loss; = Leader, 1995–96 UEFA Champions League Group stage; = 1995–96 UEFA Cup First round; = 1994–95 Relegation playoff to 1995–96 Segunda Division; = 1995–96 Segunda Division; R = 1995–96 UEFA Cup Winners' Cup

==== Matches ====
4 September 1994 1	Sporting de Gijón	2–1	FC Barcelona	Gijón
	Pier 15'; Ledyakhov 42'	Report	Koeman 31'	Stadium: El Molinón

9 September 1994 2	FC Barcelona	2–1	Racing de Santander	Barcelona
	Cruyff 7'; Koeman 28' (pen.)	Report	Popov 6'	Stadium: Camp Nou

16 September 1994 3	RCD Español	0–0	FC Barcelona	Barcelona
		Report		Stadium: Sarrià

23 September 1994 4	FC Barcelona	4–0	SD Compostela	Barcelona
	Stoichkov 21' 58'; Hagi 76' 86'	Report		Stadium: Camp Nou

2 October 1994 5	Real Zaragoza	2–1	FC Barcelona	Zaragoza
	Esnáider 11'; Geli 22'	Report	Koeman 75' (pen.)	Stadium: La Romareda

8 October 1994 6	FC Barcelona	4–3	Atlético de Madrid	Barcelona
	Romario 10' 77'; Guardiola 33'; Stoichkov 40'	Report	Pirri Mori 25'; Kiko 80'; Valencia 86'	Stadium: Camp Nou

15 October 1994 7	Valencia CF	1–2	FC Barcelona	Valencia
	Mijatović 12'	Report	Koeman 51' (pen.); Stoichkov 89'	Stadium: Mestalla

23 October 1994 8	FC Barcelona	1–0	CD Tenerife	Barcelona
	Bakero 5'	Report		Stadium: Camp Nou

28 October 1994 9	Real Sociedad	1–1	FC Barcelona	San Sebastián
	Kodro 78'	Report	Romario 34'	Stadium: Anoeta

5 November 1994 10	FC Barcelona	1–0	Real Oviedo	Barcelona
	Stoichkov 35'	Report		Stadium: Camp Nou

18 November 1994 11	Real Valladolid	1–3	FC Barcelona	Valladolid
	Matosas 88'	Report	Koeman 58' (pen.); Stoichkov 68'; Bakero 85'	Stadium: José Zorrilla

26 November 1994 12	FC Barcelona	0–1	Sevilla FC	Barcelona
		Report	Šuker 6'	Stadium: Camp Nou

2 December 1994 13	FC Barcelona	1–1	Deportivo La Coruña	Barcelona
	Koeman 33'	Report	Salinas 89'	Stadium: Camp Nou

10 December 1994 14	Celta de Vigo	2–4	FC Barcelona	Vigo
	Losada 86'; Gudelj 89'	Report	Stoichkov 12'; Romario 54'; Koeman 80' (pen.); Hagi 87'	Stadium: Balaídos

20 December 1994 15	FC Barcelona	1–1	Real Betis	Barcelona
	Abelardo 88'	Report	Alexis 64' (pen.)	Stadium: Camp Nou

6 January 1995 16	Real Madrid	5–0	FC Barcelona	Madrid
	Zamorano 5' 21' 39'; Luis Enrique 68'; Amavisca 70'	Report		Stadium: Santiago Bernabéu; Referee: Francisco Santamaria Uzqueda

14 January 1995 17	FC Barcelona	3–0	CD Logroñés	Barcelona
	Bakero 30'; Abelardo 55'; Cruyff 81'	Report		Stadium: Camp Nou

21 January 1995 18	Albacete Balompié	2–2	FC Barcelona	Albacete
	Derycia 1'; Bjelica 32'	Report	Amor 19'; Abelardo 84'	Stadium: Carlos Belmonte

27 January 1995 19	FC Barcelona	1–0	Athletic de Bilbao	Barcelona
	Bakero 83'	Report		Stadium: Camp Nou

4 February 1995 20	FC Barcelona	3–1	Sporting de Gijón	Barcelona
	Hagi 18'; Escaich 73'; Iglesias 85'	Report	Morales 9'	Stadium: Camp Nou

10 February 1995 21	Racing de Santander	5–0	FC Barcelona	Santander
	Esteban Torre 44'; Quique Setien 52'; Merino 68'; Radchenko 73' 89' (pen.)	Report		Stadium: El Sardinero

17 February 1995 22	FC Barcelona	3–0	RCD Espanyol	Barcelona
	Stoichkov 2'; Begiristain 22'; Barjuán 28'	Report		Stadium: Camp Nou

24 February 1995 23	SD Compostela	1–2	FC Barcelona	Santiago de Compostela
	Llorente 75'	Report	Cruyff 11'; Begiristain 55'	Stadium: San Lázaro

4 March 1995 24	FC Barcelona	3–0	Real Zaragoza	Barcelona
	Koeman 15' (pen.); Begiristain 46'; Amor 89'	Report		Stadium: Camp Nou

10 March 1995 25	Atlético de Madrid	2–0	FC Barcelona	Madrid
	Rocha 44' (pen.) 51'	Report		Stadium: Vicente Calderón

18 March 1995 26	FC Barcelona	0–0	Valencia CF	Barcelona
		Report		Stadium: Camp Nou

1 April 1995 27	CD Tenerife	2–1	FC Barcelona	Santa Cruz de Tenerife
	Ramis 71'; Llorente 85'	Report	Amor 61'	Stadium: Heliodoro Rodríguez López

8 April 1995 28	FC Barcelona	1–1	Real Sociedad	Barcelona
	Stoichkov 61'	Report	Imaz 89'	Stadium: Camp Nou

15 April 1995 29	Real Oviedo	0–0	FC Barcelona	Oviedo
		Report		Stadium: Carlos Tartiere

22 April 1995 30	FC Barcelona	4–1	Real Valladolid	Barcelona
	Cruyff 8' 57'; Begiristain 39'; Amor 83'	Report	Alberto 88'	Stadium: Camp Nou

29 April 1995 31	Sevilla FC	4–2	FC Barcelona	Seville
	Barjuán 22' (o.g.); Monchu 40' 61'; Soler 82'	Report	Koeman 12' (pen.); Abelardo 73'	Stadium: Sánchez Pizjuán

5 May 1995 32	Deportivo La Coruña	1–0	FC Barcelona	A Coruña
	Donato 4' (pen.)	Report		Stadium: Riazor

13 May 1995 33	FC Barcelona	1–1	Celta de vigo	Barcelona
	Cruyff 65'	Report	Gudelj 77'	Stadium: Camp Nou

20 May 1995 34	Real Betis	1–1	FC Barcelona	Seville
	Stošić 30'	Report	Nadal 29'	Stadium: Benito Villamarín

26 May 1995 35	FC Barcelona	1–0	Real Madrid	Barcelona
	Nadal 62'	Report		Stadium: Camp Nou

3 June 1995 36	CD Logroñés	1–4	FC Barcelona	Logroño
	Sílvio 33'	Report	Begiristain 12'; Cruyff 44' 75'; Guardiola 46'	Stadium: Las Gaunas

9 June 1995 37	FC Barcelona	0–1	Albacete Balompié	Barcelona
		Report	Bjelica 30'	Stadium: Camp Nou

17 June 1995 38	Athletic de Bilbao	0–2	FC Barcelona	Bilbao
		Report	Begiristain 37'; Cruyff 77'	Stadium: San Mamés

=== Copa del Rey ===
Round of 16

4 January 1994	Barcelona	1–4	Atlético de Madrid	Barcelona
20:30	Abelardo 1'	Report	Simeone 15' (pen.); Valencia 53', 89'; Pirri Mori 68'	Stadium: Camp Nou; Attendance: 60,000

14 February 1994	Atlético de Madrid	1–3	Barcelona	Madrid
20:30	Caminero 45'	Report	Hagi 8'; Stoichkov 49' (pen.), 57' (pen.)	Stadium: Estadio Vicente Calderón; Attendance: 55,000

=== Supercopa de España ===
26 August 1994	Real Zaragoza	0–2	Barcelona	Zaragoza
		Report	Stoichkov 45'; Amor 64'	Stadium: La Romareda; Attendance: 15,000

29 August 1994	Barcelona	4–5	Real Zaragoza	Barcelona
	Txiki 13', 87'; Stoichkov 50', 69'	Report	Belsué 10'; Esnáider 32'; Higuera 33', 77', 89'	Stadium: Camp Nou; Attendance: 70,000

=== UEFA Champions League ===
==== Group stage ====
Pos	Team	Pld	W	D	L	GF	GA	GD	Pts	Qualification	GOT	BAR	MUN	GAL
1	(Sweden) IFK Göteborg	6	4	1	1	10	7	+3	9	Advance to knockout stage	—	2–1	3–1	1–0
2	(Spain) Barcelona	6	2	2	2	11	8	+3	6	Advance to knockout stage	1–1	—	4–0	2–1
3	(England) Manchester United	6	2	2	2	11	11	0	6		4–2	2–2	—	4–0
4	(Turkey) Galatasaray	6	1	1	4	3	9	−6	3		0–1	2–1	0–0	—

Source: UEFA

14 September 1994	Barcelona (Spain)	2–1	(Turkey) Galatasaray	Barcelona
20:30	Koeman 30'; Amor 50'	Report	Türkyilmaz 14'	Stadium: Camp Nou; Attendance: 70,000; Referee: Piero Ceccarini (Italy)

28 September 1994	IFK Göteborg (Sweden)	2–1	(Spain) Barcelona	Ullevi, Gothenburg
20:30	Erlingmark 74'; Blomqvist 89'	Report	Stoichkov 10'	Attendance: 32,215; Referee: Bernd Heynemann (Germany)

19 October 1994	Manchester United (England)	2–2	(Spain) Barcelona	Manchester
19:30	Hughes 19'; Sharpe 80'	Report	Romário 34'; Bakero 49'	Stadium: Old Trafford; Attendance: 40,064; Referee: Ion Crăciunescu (Romania)

2 November 1994	Barcelona (Spain)	4–0	(England) Manchester United	Barcelona
20:30	Stoichkov 9', 52'; Romário 45'; Ferrer 88'	Report		Stadium: Camp Nou; Attendance: 114,273; Referee: Joël Quiniou (France)

23 November 1994	Galatasaray (Turkey)	2–1	(Spain) Barcelona	Istanbul
21:30	Şükür 71' (pen.); Busquets 87' (o.g.)	Report	Romário 15'	Stadium: Ali Sami Yen Stadium; Attendance: 18,375; Referee: Vadim Zhuk (Belarus)

7 December 1994	Barcelona (Spain)	1–1	(Sweden) IFK Göteborg	Barcelona
20:30	Bakero 81'	Report	Rehn 88'	Stadium: Camp Nou; Attendance: 75,000; Referee: Frans van den Wijngaert (Belgium)

==== Quarterfinals ====
1 March 1995	Barcelona (Spain)	1–1	(France) Paris Saint-Germain	Camp Nou, Barcelona
21:00	Korneev 48'	Report	Weah 54'	Attendance: 115,000; Referee: Vaclav Krondl (Czech Republic)

15 March 1995	Paris Saint-Germain (France)	2–1	(Spain) Barcelona	Parc des Princes, Paris
21:15	Raí 72'; Guérin 83'	Report	Bakero 49'	Attendance: 45,604; Referee: Gerd Grabher (Austria)

=== Friendlies ===
GAMES 1994–1995

2-8-1994 FRIENDLY GRONINGEN-BARCELONA 5–5

3-8-1994 FRIENDLY DE GRAAFSCHAP-BARCELONA 1–4

4-8-1994 FRIENDLY BAYER LEVERKUSEN-BARCELONA 1–0

6-8-1994 FRIENDLY PSV EINDHOVEN-BARCELONA 0–1

8-8-1994 FRIENDLY UTRECHT-BARCELONA 2–2

10-8-1994 FRIENDLY BAYERN MUNICH-BARCELONA 3–0

11-8-1994 FRIENDLY PSV EINDHOVEN-BARCELONA 3–1

14-8-1994 CITY OF SALAMANCA TROPHY ATLÉTICO DE MADRID-BARCELONA 1–2

14-8-1994 CITY OF SALAMANCA TROPHY UD SALAMANCA-BARCELONA 1–2

15-8-1994 CITY OF OVIEDO TROPHY REAL OVIEDO-BARCELONA 1–1/5–3/ PENALTY

18-8-1994 ORANGE TROPHY VALLADOLID-BARCELONA 0–1

19-8-1994 ORANGE TROPHY VALENCIA-BARCELONA 1–0

23-8-1994 Joan Gamper Trophy BARCELONA-BRESCIA 4–0

24-8-1994 Joan Gamper Trophy BARCELONA-VALENCIA 1–4

4-10-1994 FRIENDLY ROMA-BARCELONA 3–3

12-10-1994 FRIENDLY PREMIÀ-BARCELONA 1–4

8-11-1994 FRIENDLY BLACKBURN ROVERS-BARCELONA 3–1

15-11-1994 COPA CATALUNYA FIGUERES-BARCELONA 2–2/5–4/ PENALTY

16-5-1995 FRIENDLY LLEIDA-BARCELONA 2–2

21-6-1995 FRIENDLY FIGUERES-BARCELONA 3–6

25-11-1995 FRIENDLY SELECCIÓ CATALUNYA-BARCELONA 5–2

== Statistics ==
=== Players statistics ===
No.	Pos	Nat	Player	Total		La Liga		Copa del Rey		Champions League	
No.	Pos	Nat	Player	Apps	Goals	Apps	Goals	Apps	Goals	Apps	Goals
	GK	(Spain) ESP	Busquets	40	-47	32	-36	0	0	8	-11
	DF	(Spain) ESP	Ferrer	37	1	30+1	0	0+1	0	5	1
	DF	(Spain) ESP	Abelardo	39	5	27+3	4	2	1	4+3	0
	DF	(Netherlands) NED	Koeman	41	10	26+6	9	1	0	8	1
	DF	(Spain) ESP	Nadal	34	2	24+5	2	0	0	5	0
	DF	(Spain) ESP	Sergi	44	1	34	1	2	0	8	0
	MF	(Spain) ESP	Amor	41	5	21+13	4	0+1	0	4+2	1
	MF	(Spain) ESP	Guardiola	32	2	22+2	2	2	0	6	0
	MF	(Spain) ESP	Bakero	41	7	31+3	4	0	0	7	3
	FW	(Spain) ESP	Begiristain	31	6	22+2	6	1	0	5+1	0
	FW	(Bulgaria) BUL	Stoichkov	37	14	27	9	2	2	8	3
	GK	(Spain) ESP	Angoy	6	-6	3+2	-3	0+1	-3	0	0
	FW	(Netherlands) NED	Cruyff	35	9	21+7	9	1+1	0	2+3	0
	MF	(Spain) ESP	Iglesias	31	1	19+5	1	2	0	3+2	0
	MF	(Romania) ROU	Hagi	21	5	14+3	4	2	1	2	0
	MF	(Spain) ESP	Eusebio	21	0	12+4	0	0	0	4+1	0
	FW	(Brazil) BRA	Romário	18	7	12+1	4	0	0	5	3
	MF	(Spain) ESP	Eskurza	18	0	11+4	0	2	0	0+1	0
	FW	(Russia) RUS	Korneev	13	1	8+4	0	0	0	1	1
	MF	(Spain) ESP	José Mari	15	0	7+5	0	1	0	1+1	0
	MF	(Spain) ESP	Roger	5	0	5	0	0	0	0	0
	DF	(Spain) ESP	Sánchez Jara	8	0	3+3	0	1	0	0+1	0
	GK	(Spain) ESP	Lopetegui	5	-8	3	-6	2	-2	0	0
	MF	(Spain) ESP	Cembranos	6	0	2+1	0	0	0	2+1	0
	MF	(Spain) ESP	Arpon	3	0	1+2	0	0	0	0	0
	FW	(Spain) ESP	Escaich	3	1	1+2	1	0	0	0	0
	DF	(Spain) ESP	Sánchez Moreno	0	0	0	0	0	0	0	0
	DF	(Spain) ESP	Celades	0	0	0	0	0	0	0	0

- Source: https://www.bdfutbol.com/en/t/t1994-951.html

== See also ==
- FC Barcelona
- 1993–94 La Liga
- Copa del Rey
- Spanish Super Cup
