= 1993–94 FC Barcelona season =

95th season in existence of FC Barcelona

FC Barcelona
1993–94 season
- President: Josep Lluís Núñez
- Head Coach: Johan Cruyff
- Stadium: Camp Nou
- La Liga: 1st
- Copa del Rey: Quarter-finals
- UEFA Champions League: Runners-up
- Supercopa de España: Runners-up
- Top goalscorer: League: Romário (30); All: Romário (32)
Home colours	Away colours

FC Barcelona had one of its most successful seasons in the club's history, retaining the domestic league supremacy and reaching the final of the UEFA Champions League; however they collapsed 0–4 against A.C. Milan (goals from Daniele Massaro, Dejan Savićević and Marcel Desailly). Their progress to the final in Athens had been virtually flawless. Indeed, on their way the Catalans had won four group games and drawn two to reach the semifinals, where they defeated FC Porto in a single-game tie at Camp Nou.

Romário and Hristo Stoichkov and Ronald Koeman were the main reasons for Barcelona' success. Rather than relying on the tight defence of the previous season, Barcelona had four of the league's top scorers.

== Squad ==
Correct as of 23 October 2009. Note: Flags indicate national team as defined under FIFA eligibility rules; some limited exceptions apply. Players may hold more than one non-FIFA nationality.

No.	Pos.	Nation	Player
—	GK	(Spain) ESP	Jesús Angoy
—	GK	(Spain) ESP	Carles Busquets
—	GK	(Spain) ESP	Andoni Zubizarreta
—	DF	(Spain) ESP	Albert Ferrer
—	DF	(Spain) ESP	Juan Carlos
—	DF	(Netherlands) NED	Ronald Koeman
—	DF	(Spain) ESP	Miguel Ángel Nadal
—	DF	(Spain) ESP	Sergi
—	MF	(Spain) ESP	Guillermo Amor
—	MF	(Spain) ESP	José Mari Bakero (captain)
—	MF	(Spain) ESP	Eusebio
—	MF	(Spain) ESP	Pep Guardiola

No.	Pos.	Nation	Player
—	MF	(Spain) ESP	Iván Iglesias
—	MF	(Croatia) CRO	Goran Vučević
—	FW	(Spain) ESP	Txiki Begiristain
—	FW	(Denmark) DEN	Ronnie Ekelund
—	FW	(Spain) ESP	Quique Estebaranz
—	FW	(Spain) ESP	Andoni Goikoetxea
—	FW	(Spain) ESP	Julio Salinas
—	FW	(Denmark) DEN	Michael Laudrup
—	FW	(Spain) ESP	Óscar
—	FW	(Brazil) BRA	Romário
—	FW	(Bulgaria) BUL	Hristo Stoichkov

=== Transfers ===
In
Pos.	Name	from	Type
FW	Romário	PSV Eindhoven	
FW	Quique Estebaranz	CD Tenerife	
MF	Iván Iglesias	Sporting Gijon	
FW	Ronnie Ekelund		
GK	Guzman		

Out
Pos.	Name	To	Type
MF	Richard Witschge	Girondins Bordeaux	-
DF	Pablo Alfaro	Racing Santander	
DF	Alexanko		retired
DF	Miquel Soler	Sevilla CF	
MF	Ricardo Serna	Deportivo La Coruña	
FW	Thomas Christiansen	Sporting Gijon	loan
FW	Pablo Maqueda	Real Oviedo	
DF	Lluís Carreras	Real Oviedo	loan

==== Winter ====
In
Pos.	Name	from	Type

Out
Pos.	Name	To	Type

== Friendlies ==
GAMES
24-5-1994 Copa Catalunya SANT ANDREU-BARCELONA 0–2

30-5-1994 Copa Catalunya BARCELONA-ANDORRA 1–2

28-7-1993 FRIENDLY VV BUITEMPOST-BARCELONA 0–13

29-7-1993 FRIENDLY TWENTE-BARCELONA 1–0

31-7-1993 FRIENDLY FEYENOORD-BARCELONA 4–2

2-8-1993 FRIENDLY SC HEERENVEEN-BARCELONA 5–4

4-8-1993 FRIENDLY AJAX-BARCELONA 2–4

6-8-1993 Trofeo Ciudad de Oviedo OVIEDO-BARCELONA 0-1 /3-5/ PENALS

8-8-1993 Trofeo Ciudad de Oviedo MILAN-BARCELONA 3–0

12-8-1993 Teresa Herrera Trophy DEPORTIVO-BARCELONA 0–1

14-8-1993 Teresa Herrera Trophy SAO PAULO-BARCELONA 0–1

16-8-1993 TROFEO FORTA-Antena3 TV SEVILLA-BARCELONA 1–2

16-8-1993 TROFEO FORTA-Antena3 TV ATLETICO MADRID-BARCELONA 0–2

18-8-1993 FRIENDLY BENFICA – BARCELONA 2–1

24-8-1993 Joan Gamper Trophy BARCELONA-HAJDUK SPLIT 4–0

25-8-1993 Joan Gamper Trophy BARCELONA-TENERIFE 1–3

28-8-1993 ISLA DE TENERIFE BOCA JUNIORS-BARCELONA 1-0 /6-5/ PENALS

28-8-1993 ISLA DE TENERIFE TENERIFE-BARCELONA 1–5

31-8-1993 Trofeo Olímpico SEVILLA-BARCELONA 1–5

31-8-1993 Trofeo Olímpico PARMA-BARCELONA 0–0

26-10-1993 FRIENDLY COPENHAGEN-BARCELONA 2–3

8-2-1994 FRIENDLY BARCELONA-BORUSSIA DORTMUND 3–0

8-3-1994 FRIENDLY BARCELONA-BAYERN MUNICH 1–0

21-5-1994 TROFEO DE LAS TELEVISIONES AUTONÓMICAS ATHLETIC DE BILBAO-BARCELONA 2–1

25-5-1994 TROFEO DE LAS TELEVISIONES AUTONÓMICAS CELTA – BARCELONA 3–0

1-6-1994 TROFEO DE LAS TELEVISIONES AUTONÓMICAS BARCELONA – ATHLETIC 1–0

4-6-1994 TROFEO DE LAS TELEVISIONES AUTONÓMICAS BARCELONA – CELTA DE VIGO 2–1

== Competitions ==
=== La Liga ===
==== League table ====
Pos	Team	Pld	W	D	L	GF	GA	GD	Pts	Qualification or relegation
1	Barcelona (C)	38	25	6	7	91	42	+49	56 (Note: DEP 1–0 BAR; BAR 3–0 DEP)	Qualification for the Champions League group stage
2	Deportivo La Coruña	38	22	12	4	54	18	+36	56	Qualification for the UEFA Cup first round
3	Zaragoza	38	19	8	11	71	47	+24	46	Qualification for the Cup Winners' Cup first round (Note: Zaragoza entered UEFA Cup Winners' Cup as winners of 1993–94 Copa del Rey.)
4	Real Madrid	38	19	7	12	61	50	+11	45	Qualification for the UEFA Cup first round
5	Athletic Bilbao	38	16	11	11	61	47	+14	43	Qualification for the UEFA Cup first round

Source: LFP
Rules for classification: 1) points; 2) head-to-head points; 3) head-to-head goal difference; 4) head-to-head goals scored; 5) goal difference; 6) number of goals scored.
(C) Champions

==== Results by round ====
Round	1	2	3	4	5	6	7	8	9	10	11	12	13	14	15	16	17	18	19	20	21	22	23	24	25	26	27	28	29	30	31	32	33	34	35	36	37	38
Ground	H	A	A	H	A	H	A	H	A	H	A	H	A	H	A	H	A	H	A	A	H	H	A	H	A	H	A	H	A	H	A	H	A	H	A	H	A	H
Result	W	D	D	W	W	W	L	W	L	W	W	L	W	D	W	W	L	W	D	L	W	L	L	W	W	W	W	W	D	W	W	W	D	W	W	W	W	W
Position	4	4	5	3	2	1	1	1	4	2	2	3	1	2	2	2	2	2	2	2	2	2	3	3	3	2	2	2	2	2	2	2	2	2	2	2	2	1

Source: https://www.bdfutbol.com/en/t/t1992-9339.html?tab=partits
A = Away; H = Home; W = Win; D = Draw; L = Loss; = Leader, 1993–94 UEFA Champions League Group stage; = 1994–95 UEFA Cup First round; = 1993–94 Relegation playoff to 1994–95 Segunda Division; = 1994–95 Segunda Division; R = 1994–95 UEFA Cup Winners' Cup

==== Matches ====
5 September 1993 1	FC Barcelona	3-0	Real Sociedad	Barcelona
	Romário 15' 65' 88'	Report		Stadium: Camp Nou

11 September 1993 2	Albacete Balompié	0-0	FC Barcelona	Albacete
		Report		Stadium: Carlos Belmonte

19 September 1993 3	Athletic de Bilbao	0-0	FC Barcelona	Bilbao
		Report		Stadium: San Mamés

26 September 1993 4	FC Barcelona	4-1	Real Zaragoza	Barcelona
	Begiristain 9' 12' 45'; Estebaranz 52'	Report	Higuera 9'	Stadium: Camp Nou

3 October 1993 5	Osasuna	2-3	FC Barcelona	Pamplona
	Merino 65'; Ziober 89'	Report	Romário 33' 39'; Stoichkov 82'	Stadium: El Sadar

6 October 1993 6	FC Barcelona	3-0	Real Valladolid	Barcelona
	Begiristain 5' 9'; Romário 70'	Report		Stadium: Camp Nou

16 October 1993 7	Deportivo La Coruña	1-0	FC Barcelona	A Coruña
	Bebeto 52'	Report		Stadium: Riazor

24 October 1993 8	FC Barcelona	1-0	Real Oviedo	Barcelona
	Bakero 45'	Report		Stadium: Camp Nou

30 October 1993 9	Atlético de Madrid	4-3	FC Barcelona	Madrid
	Kosecki 47' 73'; Pedro 55'; Caminero 89'	Report	Romário 14' 24' 34'	Stadium: Vicente Calderón

7 November 1993 10	FC Barcelona	2-1	Racing de Santander	Barcelona
	Stoichkov 6'; Romário 26'	Report	Geli 47'	Stadium: Camp Nou

10 November 1993 11	CD Tenerife	2-3	FC Barcelona	Santa Cruz de Tenerife
	Conte 48'; Felipe 77'	Report	Romário 6' 60'; Stoichkov 39'	Stadium: Heliodoro Rodríguez López

20 November 1993 12	FC Barcelona	0-1	UE Lleida	Barcelona
		Report	Jaime 87'	Stadium: Camp Nou

28 November 1993 13	Rayo Vallecano	2-4	FC Barcelona	Madrid
	Sánchez 30' (pen.) 82' (pen.)	Report	Amor 20' 76'; Koeman 37' (pen.) 58'	Stadium: Vallecas

4 December 1993 14	FC Barcelona	2-2	CD Logroñés	Barcelona
	Romário 23'; Koeman 49' (pen.)	Report	Salenko 24'; Eraña 36'	Stadium: Camp Nou

11 December 1993 15	Valencia CF	0-4	FC Barcelona	Valencia
		Report	Stoichkov 30'; Bakero 34' 74'; Koeman 85' (pen.)	Stadium: Mestalla

19 December 1993 16	FC Barcelona	1-0	Celta de Vigo	Barcelona
	Laudrup 16'	Report		Stadium: Camp Nou

2 January 1994 17	Sporting de Gijón	2-0	FC Barcelona	Gijón
	Abelardo 34'; Miner 75'	Report		Stadium: El Molinón

8 January 1994 18	FC Barcelona	5-0	Real Madrid	Barcelona
	Romario 24' 56' 81'; Koeman 47'; Iván Iglesias 86'	Report		Stadium: Camp Nou; Referee: Joaquin Urio Velazquez

16 January 1994 19	Sevilla CF	0-0	FC Barcelona	Seville
		Report		Stadium: Sánchez Pizjuán

22 January 1994 20	Real Sociedad	2-1	FC Barcelona	San Sebastián
	Kodro 1' 54'	Report	Laudrup 8'	Stadium: Anoeta

30 January 1994 21	FC Barcelona	2-1	Albacete Balompié	Barcelona
	Salinas 71' 80'	Report	Zalazar 89' (pen.)	Stadium: Camp Nou

6 February 1994 22	FC Barcelona	2-3	Athletic de Bilbao	Barcelona
	Stoichkov 4'; Bakero 72'	Report	Valverde 2'; Ziganda 21'; Guerrero 50'	Stadium: Camp Nou

13 February 1994 23	Real Zaragoza	6-3	FC Barcelona	Zaragoza
	Cáceres 5'; Gay 15'; Esnáider 39' 44'; Higuera 65'; Poyet 74'	Report	Romario 31' 76'; Laudrup 47'	Stadium: La Romareda

19 February 1994 24	FC Barcelona	8-1	Osasuna	Barcelona
	Koeman 15' (pen.) 44' (pen.); Amor 41'; Romario 54' 60' 81'; Estebaranz 78'; Stoichkov 87' (pen.)	Report	Luque 47'	Stadium: Camp Nou

22 February 1994 25	Real Valladolid	1-3	FC Barcelona	Valladolid
	Amavisca 59'	Report	Koeman 53' 72' (pen.); Romario 88'	Stadium: José Zorrilla

27 February 1994 26	FC Barcelona	3-0	Deportivo La Coruña	Barcelona
	Stoichkov 26'; Romario 30'; Laudrup 78'	Report		Stadium: Camp Nou

6 March 1994 27	Real Oviedo	1-3	FC Barcelona	Oviedo
	Janković 57'	Report	Koeman 10'; Stoichkov 48'; Iván Iglesias 85'	Stadium: Carlos Tartiere

12 March 1994 28	FC Barcelona	5-3	Atlético de Madrid	Barcelona
	Romario 12' 65' 74'; Stoichkov 40' 80'	Report	Pedro 21' (pen.); Manolo 35'; Caminero 45'	Stadium: Camp Nou

19 March 1994 29	Racing de Santander	1-1	FC Barcelona	Santander
	Radchenko 4'	Report	Amor 83'	Stadium: El Sardinero

26 March 1994 30	FC Barcelona	2-1	CD Tenerife	Barcelona
	Koeman 11'; Romario 67'	Report	Dertycia 49'	Stadium: Camp Nou

2 April 1994 31	UE Lleida	1-2	FC Barcelona	Lleida
	Urbano 6'	Report	Iván Iglesias 77'; Amor 84'	Stadium: Camp d'Esports

6 April 1994 32	FC Barcelona	1-0	Rayo Vallecano	Barcelona
	Iván Iglesias 82'	Report		Stadium: Camp Nou

9 April 1994 33	CD Logroñés	0-0	FC Barcelona	Logroño
		Report		Stadium: Las Gaunas

16 April 1994 34	FC Barcelona	3-1	Valencia CF	Barcelona
	Begiristain 7' 28'; Stoichkov 83'	Report	Gómez 59'	Stadium: Camp Nou

23 April 1994 35	Celta de Vigo	0-4	FC Barcelona	Vigo
		Report	Stoichkov 1' 54'; Amor 55'; Estebaranz 89'	Stadium: Balaídos

1 May 1994 36	FC Barcelona	4-0	Sporting de Gijón	Barcelona
	Amor 42'; Romario 79' 89'; Stoichkov 87'	Report		Stadium: Camp Nou

7 May 1994 37	Real Madrid	0-1	FC Barcelona	Madrid
		Report	Amor 77'	Stadium: Santiago Bernabéu

14 May 1994 38	FC Barcelona	5-2	Sevilla CF	Barcelona
	Stoichkov 20' 50'; Romario 70'; Laudrup 75'; Bakero 87'	Report	Simeone 12'; Šuker 44'	Stadium: Camp Nou

=== Copa del Rey ===
==== Round of 16 ====
4 January 1994 First Leg	Sporting de Gijón	0–3	Barcelona	El Molinón, Gijón
20:30			Amor 2'; Sergi 8'; Salinas 28'	Attendance: 22,000; Referee: Brito Arceo

12 January 1994 Second Leg	Barcelona	1–1	Sporting de Gijón	Camp Nou, Barcelona
20:45	Salinas 3'		Ablanedo 11'	Attendance: 30,000; Referee: Merino González

=== Quarter-finals ===
26 January 1994 First Leg	Real Betis	0–0	Barcelona	Estadio Benito Villamarín, Sevilla
21:00				Attendance: 25,000; Referee: Raúl García de Loza

3 February 1994 Second Leg	Barcelona	0–1	Real Betis	Camp Nou, Barcelona
21:00			Juanito 29'	Attendance: 30,000; Referee: Juan Manuel Brito Arceo

=== Supercopa de España ===
2 December 1993	Real Madrid	3–1	Barcelona	Santiago Bernabéu Stadium, Madrid
21:00	Alfonso 35', 89'; Zamorano 55'		Stoichkov 17'	Attendance: 45,000; Referee: Ansuátegui Roca

16 December 1993	Barcelona	1–1	Real Madrid	Camp Nou, Barcelona
21:15	Bakero 65'		Zamorano 21'	Attendance: 65,000; Referee: Manuel Díaz Vega

== European Cup ==
=== First round ===
15 September 1993 First Leg	Dynamo Kyiv (Ukraine)	3–1	(Spain) Barcelona	Republikan, Kyiv
19:00	Shkapenko 5'; Leonenko 45' (pen.), 56'	Report	Koeman 28' (pen.)	Attendance: 60,000; Referee: Philip Don (England)

29 September 1993 Second Leg	Barcelona (Spain)	4–1	(Ukraine) Dynamo Kyiv	Camp Nou, Barcelona
21:00	Laudrup 9'; Bakero 17', 47'; Koeman 67'	Report	Rebrov 28'	Attendance: 88,600; Referee: Angelo Amendolia (Italy)

=== Second round ===
20 October 1993 First Leg	Barcelona (Spain)	3–0	Austria Wien	Camp Nou, Barcelona
21:00	Koeman 37' (pen.), 73'; Estebaranz 89'	Report		Attendance: 70,000; Referee: Hellmut Krug (Germany)

3 November 1993 Second Leg	Austria Wien	1–2	(Spain) Barcelona	Ernst-Happel-Stadion, Vienna
19:35	Ogris 39'	Report	Stoichkov 5', 77'	Attendance: 25,000; Referee: Jim McCluskey (Scotland)

=== UEFA Champions League ===
==== Group stage ====
Pos	Team	Pld	W	D	L	GF	GA	GD	Pts	Qualification
1	(Spain) Barcelona	6	4	2	0	13	3	+10	10	Advance to knockout stage
2	(France) Monaco	6	3	1	2	9	4	+5	7	Advance to knockout stage
3	(Russia) Spartak Moscow	6	1	3	2	6	12	−6	5	
4	(Turkey) Galatasaray	6	0	2	4	1	10	−9	2	

Source: UEFA

24 November 1993 1	Galatasaray (Turkey)	0–0	(Spain) Barcelona	Ali Sami Yen Stadium, Istanbul
21:30		Report		Attendance: 30,000; Referee: Frans van den Wijngaert (Belgium)

8 December 1993 2	Barcelona (Spain)	2–0	(France) AS Monaco	Camp Nou, Barcelona
20:30	Beguiristain 15', 26'	Report		Attendance: 89,000; Referee: Kim Milton Nielsen (Denmark)

2 March 1994 3	Spartak Moscow (Russia)	2–2	(Spain) Barcelona	Luzhniki Stadium, Moscow
20:00	Rodionov 77'; Karpin 88'	Report	Stoichkov 11'; Romário 67'	Attendance: 61,000; Referee: Sándor Puhl (Hungary)

16 March 1994 4	Barcelona (Spain)	5–1	(Russia) Spartak Moscow	Camp Nou, Barcelona
20:30	Stoichkov 33'; Amor 75'; Koeman 77', 80'; Romário 86' (pen.)	Report	Karpin 3'	Attendance: 80,000; Referee: Serge Muhmenthaler (Switzerland)

30 March 1994 5	Barcelona (Spain)	3–0	(Turkey) Galatasaray	Camp Nou, Barcelona
20:30	Amor 21'; Koeman 70' (pen.); Eusebio 77'	Report		Attendance: 85,000; Referee: Les Mottram (Scotland)

13 April 1994 6	AS Monaco (France)	0–1	(Spain) Barcelona	Stade Louis II, Monaco
20:30		Report	Stoichkov 13'	Attendance: 20,000; Referee: Ion Crăciunescu (Romania)

==== Semi-final ====
27 April 1994	Barcelona (Spain)	3–0	(Portugal) Porto	Camp Nou, Barcelona
20:30	Stoichkov 10', 35'; Koeman 72'	Report		Attendance: 98,000; Referee: Vadim Zhuk (Belarus)

=== Final ===
18 May 1994	Milan (Italy)	4–0	(Spain) Barcelona	Athens, Greece
21:15 EEST	Massaro 22', 45+2', (yellow card) 45'; Tassotti (yellow card) 35'; Savićević 47'; Albertini (yellow card) 53'; Desailly 58'; Panucci (yellow card) 88'	Report	Stoichkov (yellow card) 24'; Bakero (yellow card) 48'; Nadal (yellow card) 54'; Sergi (yellow card) 55'; Ferrer (yellow card) 58'	Stadium: Olympic Stadium; Attendance: 70,000; Referee: Philip Don (England)

== Chronology ==
- Thursday, July 1 — PSV Eindhoven accepts a 400 million transfer for Romário, mostly financed with Witschge's 360 million transfer to Girondins.

== Statistics ==
=== Players statistics ===
No.	Pos	Nat	Player	Total		La Liga		Copa del Rey		Champions League	
No.	Pos	Nat	Player	Apps	Goals	Apps	Goals	Apps	Goals	Apps	Goals
	GK	(Spain) ESP	Zubizarreta	46	-49	34	-37	0	0	12	-12
	DF	(Spain) ESP	Ferrer	50	0	33+1	0	4	0	12	0
	DF	(Netherlands) NED	Koeman	49	19	27+8	11	2	0	12	8
	DF	(Spain) ESP	Nadal	49	0	27+6	0	4	0	11+1	0
	DF	(Spain) ESP	Sergi	33	1	22+1	0	2	1	8	0
	MF	(Spain) ESP	Amor	51	11	31+6	8	2	1	9+3	2
	MF	(Spain) ESP	Guardiola	46	0	33+1	0	1+2	0	9	0
	MF	(Spain) ESP	Bakero	44	7	34	5	1	0	9	2
	FW	(Bulgaria) BUL	Stoichkov	46	23	30+4	16	4	0	8	7
	FW	(Brazil) BRA	Romário	45	32	31+2	30	1+1	0	10	2
	FW	(Spain) ESP	Begiristain	33	9	17+3	7	2+1	0	8+2	2
	GK	(Spain) ESP	Busquets	9	-7	4+1	-5	4	-2	0	0
	MF	(Denmark) DEN	Laudrup	38	6	25+6	5	1	0	6	1
	FW	(Spain) ESP	Goikoetxea	40	0	20+8	0	3	0	5+4	0
	MF	(Spain) ESP	Iglesias	37	4	19+6	4	4	0	5+3	0
	MF	(Spain) ESP	Eusebio	31	1	15+5	0	4	0	2+5	1
	FW	(Spain) ESP	Estebaranz	23	4	8+6	3	2+1	0	3+3	1
	DF	(Spain) ESP	Juan Carlos	12	0	7+2	0	0	0	1+2	0
	FW	(Spain) ESP	Salinas	13	4	0+7	2	4	2	1+1	0
	FW	(Spain) ESP	Óscar	4	0	1+1	0	0+1	0	1	0
	FW	(Denmark) DEN	Ekelund	2	0	0+1	0	0+1	0	0	0
	GK	(Spain) ESP	Angoy	0	0	0	0	0	0	0	0
	MF	(Croatia) CRO	Vucevic	0	0	0	0	0	0	0	0

== See also ==
- FC Barcelona
- 1993–94 La Liga
- Copa del Rey
- Spanish Super Cup
