= 1992–93 FC Barcelona season =

94th season in existence of FC Barcelona

FC Barcelona
1992–93 season
- President: Josep Lluís Núñez
- Head Coach: Johan Cruyff
- Stadium: Camp Nou
- La Liga: 1st
- Copa del Rey: Semi-finals
- Supercopa de España: Winners
- UEFA Champions League: Second round
- UEFA Super Cup: Winners
- Intercontinental Cup: Runner-up
- Top goalscorer: League: Hristo Stoichkov (20); All: Hristo Stoichkov (23)
Home colours	Away colours

The 1992–93 season was the 94th season for FC Barcelona. In La Liga, there was an eerie sense of deja vu in the season as it came down to the final match day with Barcelona trailing Real Madrid by a solitary point. It seemed as though Real Madrid were poised to lift the title, playing their final game, ironically against Tenerife, who denied them the title on the final day of the previous season. Much to the shock of everyone, Tenerife beat Los Blancos 2–0, and with FC Barcelona beating Real Zaragoza 1–0, they won the third consecutive championship in a similar fashion to the previous season.

Surprisingly the side was defeated in early rounds of UEFA Champions League and lost the 1992 Intercontinental Cup against Brazilian team São Paulo.

== Squad ==
Note: Flags indicate national team as defined under FIFA eligibility rules; some limited exceptions apply. Players may hold more than one non-FIFA nationality.

No.	Pos.	Nation	Player
—	GK	ESP	Andoni Zubizarreta (captain)
—	GK	ESP	Carles Busquets
—	DF	ESP	Albert Ferrer
—	DF	ESP	José Ramón Alexanko
—	DF	ESP	Juan Carlos
—	DF	NED	Ronald Koeman
—	DF	ESP	Miguel Ángel Nadal
—	DF	ESP	Sergi
—	DF	ESP	Pablo Alfaro
—	DF	ESP	Miquel Soler
—	DF	ESP	Lluís Carreras
—	MF	ESP	Guillermo Amor
—	MF	ESP	José Mari Bakero (vice-captain)

No.	Pos.	Nation	Player
—	MF	ESP	Eusebio
—	MF	ESP	Pep Guardiola
—	MF	CRO	Goran Vučević
—	MF	NED	Richard Witschge
—	FW	ESP	Txiki Begiristain
—	FW	ESP	Ion Andoni Goikoetxea
—	FW	ESP	Julio Salinas
—	FW	ESP	Pablo Maqueda
—	FW	DEN	Michael Laudrup
—	FW	ESP	Óscar
—	FW	ESP	Thomas Christiansen
—	FW	BUL	Hristo Stoichkov

=== Transfers ===
In
Pos.	Name	from	Type
DF	Sergi		
DF	Pablo Alfaro	Real Zaragoza	
DF	Miquel Soler	Atletico Madrid	

Out
Pos.	Name	To	Type
DF	Nando	Real Madrid	-
DF	Cristobal	Real Oviedo	-

==== Winter ====
In
Pos.	Name	from	Type
FW	Goran Vucevic	Hajduk Split	

Out
Pos.	Name	To	Type

=== Friendlies ===
GAMES
1-8-1992 FRIENDLY MVV WINSCHOTEN-BARCELONA 0–5

3-8-1992 FRIENDLY DRACHSTER-BARCELONA 0–9

5-8-1992 FRIENDLY BV EMMEN-BARCELONA 0–5

6-8-1992 FRIENDLY SELECT SMILDE-BARCELONA 1–20

8-8-1992 FRIENDLY FEYENOORD – BARCELONA 1–5

13-8-1992 Teresa Herrera Trophy DEPORTIVO-BARCELONA 1–2

15-8-1992 Teresa Herrera Trophy SAO PAULO-BARCELONA 4–1

18-8-1992 Trofeo Ciudad de Sevilla BETIS-BARCELONA 0–0 /2–5/ PENALTY

19-8-1992 Trofeo Ciudad de Sevilla VASCO DA GAMA-BARCELONA 3–1

25-8-1992 Joan Gamper Trophy BARCELONA-CSKA SOFIA 7–1

26-8-1992 Joan Gamper Trophy BARCELONA-FEYENOORD 2–0

29-8-1992 Trofeo Ciudad de Palma MALLORCA-BARCELONA 5–0

31-8-1992 Trofeo Ciudad de Zaragoza ZARAGOZA-BARCELONA 3–1

13-10-1992 FRIENDLY SABADELL – BARCELONA 2–2

30-3-1993 COPA GENERALITAT LLEIDA-BARCELONA 0–1

22-4-1993 COPA GENERALITAT SABADELL-BARCELONA 1–3

20-5-1993 COPA GENERALITAT ESPANYOL-BARCELONA 3–4

25-5-1993 FRIENDLY BARCELONA-SELECT LA LIGA ESPANOLA 4–5

== Competitions ==
=== La Liga ===
==== League table ====
Pos	Team	Pld	W	D	L	GF	GA	GD	Pts	Qualification or relegation
1	Barcelona (C)	38	25	8	5	87	34	+53	58	Qualification for the Champions League first round
2	Real Madrid	38	24	9	5	75	28	+47	57	Qualification for the Cup Winners' Cup first round (Note: Real Madrid entered European Cup Winners' Cup as winners of 1992–93 Copa del Rey.)
3	Deportivo La Coruña	38	22	10	6	67	33	+34	54	Qualification for the UEFA Cup first round
4	Valencia	38	19	10	9	60	33	+27	48	Qualification for the UEFA Cup first round
5	Tenerife	38	15	14	9	59	47	+12	44	Qualification for the UEFA Cup first round

Source: LFP
Rules for classification: 1) points; 2) head-to-head points; 3) head-to-head goal difference; 4) head-to-head goals scored; 5) goal difference; 6) number of goals scored.
(C) Champions

==== Results by round ====
Round	1	2	3	4	5	6	7	8	9	10	11	12	13	14	15	16	17	18	19	20	21	22	23	24	25	26	27	28	29	30	31	32	33	34	35	36	37	38
Ground	H	A	A	H	A	H	A	H	A	H	A	H	A	H	A	H	A	H	A	A	H	H	A	H	A	H	A	H	A	H	A	H	A	H	A	H	A	H
Result	W	D	W	W	D	D	L	W	W	W	W	W	W	W	D	W	D	W	D	L	D	D	W	W	W	W	W	W	L	W	W	W	L	W	L	W	W	W
Position	7	4	2	2	2	2	5	3	3	3	1	1	1	1	1	1	1	1	1	2	2	2	2	1	1	1	1	1	1	1	1	1	1	1	2	2	2	1

Source: Competitive matches
A = Away; H = Home; W = Win; D = Draw; L = Loss; = Leader, 1993–94 UEFA Champions League; = 1993–94 UEFA Cup; = 1993–94 UEFA Cup; = 1993–94 UEFA Cup

==== Matches ====
4 September 1992 1	FC Barcelona	2–1	Real Madrid	Barcelona
	Bakero 4'; Stoichkov 87'	Report	Míchel 71' (pen.)	Stadium: Camp Nou

11 September 1992 2	CD Tenerife	1–1	FC Barcelona	Santa Cruz de Tenerife
	Pier 83'	Report	Begiristain 10'	Stadium: Heliodoro Rodríguez López

18 September 1992 3	Atlético de Madrid	1–4	FC Barcelona	Madrid
	Futre 29'	Report	Stoichkov 4' 8' 47'; Amor 89'	Stadium: Vicente Calderón

26 September 1992 4	FC Barcelona	4–1	Real Burgos	Barcelona
	Begiristain 3'; Laudrup 12'; Bakero 25'; Stoichkov 53'	Report	Balint 44' (pen.)	Stadium: Camp Nou

4 October 1992 5	Sporting de Gijón	1–1	FC Barcelona	Gijón
	Iordanov 78'	Report	Begiristain 1'	Stadium: El Molinón

7 October 1992 6	FC Barcelona	3–3	Albacete Balompié	Barcelona
	Laudrup 9'; Stoichkov 11'; Begiristain 12'	Report	Pinilla 36'; Antônio Carlos Zago 78'; José Zalazar 87'	Stadium: Camp Nou

17 October 1992 7	Deportivo La Coruña	1–0	FC Barcelona	A Coruña
	Bebeto 63'	Report		Stadium: Riazor

25 October 1992 8	FC Barcelona	3–0	Valencia CF	Barcelona
	Stoichkov 34' 48'; Laudrup 62'	Report		Stadium: Camp Nou

30 October 1992 9	CD Logroñés	1–2	FC Barcelona	Logroño
	Cléber 26'		Amor 17'; Stoichkov 45'	Stadium: Las Gaunas

6 November 1992 10	FC Barcelona	2–1	Athletic de Bilbao	Barcelona
	Bakero 29'; Stoichkov 61'		Juan Carlos 51' (o.g.)	Stadium: Camp Nou

20 November 1992 11	Real Zaragoza	1–6	FC Barcelona	Zaragoza
	Pardeza 54' (pen.)		Koeman 21' 25' (pen.); Begiristain 41' 46'; Stoichkov 51' 67'	Stadium: La Romareda

28 November 1992 12	FC Barcelona	5–0	RCD Espanyol	Barcelona
	Stoichkov 30'; Nadal 38'; Koeman 57' (pen.); Witschge 72'; Begiristain 77'	Report		Stadium: Camp Nou

5 December 1992 13	Cádiz CF	0–4	FC Barcelona	Cádiz
		Report	Stoichkov 12' 39'; Goikoetxea 78'; Laudrup 81'	Stadium: Ramón de Carranza

19 December 1992 15	Rayo Vallecano	3–3	FC Barcelona	Madrid
	Polster 3' 19' 69' (pen.)	Report	Koeman 40' (pen.); Bakero 80'; Salinas 85'	Stadium: Vallecas

2 January 1993 16	FC Barcelona	2–0	Celta de Vigo	Barcelona
	Nadal 36'; Witschge 43'	Report		Stadium: Camp Nou

9 January 1993 17	Sevilla CF	0–0	FC Barcelona	Seville
		Report		Stadium: Ramón Sánchez Pizjuán

16 January 1993 18	FC Barcelona	2–1	Osasuna	Barcelona
	Bakero 61'; Goikoetxea 79'	Report	Kosecki 72' (pen.)	Stadium: Camp Nou

23 January 1993 19	Real Sociedad	2–2	FC Barcelona	San Sebastián
	Kodro 53' (pen.) 88'	Report	Koeman 42' (pen.); Stoichkov 62'	Stadium: Atotxa

29 January 1993 20	Real Madrid	2–1	FC Barcelona	Madrid
	Zamorano 9'; Míchel 41' (pen.)	Report	Amor 15'	Stadium: Santiago Bernabéu

6 February 1993 21	FC Barcelona	1–1	CD Tenerife	Barcelona
	Alfaro 57'	Report	Oscar Dertycia 11'	Stadium: Camp Nou

12 February 1993 22	FC Barcelona	1–1	Atlético de Madrid	Barcelona
	Koeman 13' (pen.)	Report	Postigo 58' (pen.)	Stadium: Camp Nou

20 February 1993 23	Real Burgos	0–1	FC Barcelona	Burgos
		Report	Begiristain 27'	Stadium: El Plantío

27 February 1993 24	FC Barcelona	7–2	Sporting de Gijón	Barcelona
	Laudrup 6' 41' (pen.); Begiristain 12'; Salinas 70' 83'; Stoichkov 78' 89' (pen.)	Report	Scotto 71'; Emilio 88' (pen.)	Stadium: Camp Nou

3 March 1993 14	FC Barcelona	2–0	Real Oviedo	Barcelona
	Eusebio 12'; Amor 76'	Report		Stadium: Camp Nou

6 March 1993 25	Albacete Balompié	0–2	FC Barcelona	Albacete
		Report	Begiristain 8' 23'	Stadium: Carlos Belmonte

12 March 1993 26	FC Barcelona	3–0	Deportivo La Coruña	Barcelona
	Goikoetxea 26'; Amor 43'; Koeman 57' (pen.)	Report		Stadium: Camp Nou

19 March 1993 27	Valencia CF	3–4	FC Barcelona	Valencia
	Penev 35' (pen.); Gómez 47'; Cervera 75'	Report	Nadal 2'; Begiristain 53'; Laudrup 64'; Bakero 87'	Stadium: Mestalla

3 April 1993 28	FC Barcelona	3–0	CD Logroñés	Barcelona
	Salinas 18'; Begiristain 47'; Bakero 63'	Report		Stadium: Camp Nou

9 April 1993 29	Athletic de Bilbao	1–0	FC Barcelona	Bilbao
	Mendiguren 60'	Report		Stadium: San Mamés

17 April 1993 30	FC Barcelona	1–0	Real Zaragoza	Barcelona
	Laudrup 4'	Report		Stadium: Camp Nou

1 May 1993 31	RCD Espanyol	0–1	FC Barcelona	Barcelona
		Report	Koeman 67' (pen.)	Stadium: Sarrià

8 May 1993 32	FC Barcelona	4–1	Cádiz CF	Barcelona
	Stoichkov 23'; Begiristain 45'; Bakero 60'; Koeman 86' (pen.)	Report	Fali 89'	Stadium: Camp Nou

14 May 1993 33	Real Oviedo	1–0	FC Barcelona	Oviedo
	Carlos 38' (pen.)	Report		Stadium: Carlos Tartiere

22 May 1993 34	FC Barcelona	4–0	Rayo Vallecano	Barcelona
	Salinas 7'; Bakero 22'; Koeman 60' 83' (pen.)	Report		Stadium: Camp Nou

29 May 1993 35	Celta de Vigo	3–2	FC Barcelona	Vigo
	Álvarez 5'; Ferrer 9' (o.g.); Salva 77'	Report	Laudrup 27'; Begiristain 85'	Stadium: Balaídos

4 June 1993 36	FC Barcelona	2–1	Sevilla CF	Barcelona
	Laudrup 46'; Nadal 47'	Report	Šuker 15'	Stadium: Camp Nou

12 June 1993 37	Osasuna	0–1	FC Barcelona	Pamplona
		Report	Pepin 58' (o.g.)	Stadium: El Sadar

19 June 1993 38	FC Barcelona	1–0	Real Sociedad	Barcelona
	Stoichkov 13'	Report		Stadium: Camp Nou

=== Copa del Rey ===
==== Round of 16 ====
4 February 1993 1	Atlético de Madrid	0–5	FC Barcelona	Vicente Calderón, Madrid

17 February 1993 2	FC Barcelona	6-0	Atlético de Madrid	Camp Nou, Barcelona

==== Quarter-finals ====
24 March 1993 1	Real Valladolid	1–3	FC Barcelona	José Zorrilla, Valladolid

13 April 1993 2	FC Barcelona	3-0	Real Valladolid	Camp Nou, Barcelona

==== Semi-finals ====
9 June 1993 1	Real Madrid	1–1	FC Barcelona	Santiago Bernabéu, Madrid

16 June 1993 2	FC Barcelona	1-2	Real Madrid	Camp Nou, Barcelona

=== Supercopa de España ===
28 October 1992	FC Barcelona	3–1	Atlético Madrid	Camp Nou, Barcelona
21:00	Salinas 64'; Begiristain 73', 85'		Ferreira 16'	Attendance: 32,000; Referee: Ansuátegui Roca

11 November 1992	Atlético Madrid	1–2	FC Barcelona	Vicente Calderón, Madrid
21:00	Manolo 30'		Begiristain 21'; Stoichkov 57'	Attendance: 15,000; Referee: Marín López

=== UEFA Champions League ===
==== First round ====
16 September 1992 1	FC Barcelona (Spain)	1–0	(Norway) Viking FK	Barcelona
	Amor 86'	Report		Stadium: Camp Nou; Attendance: 35,000

30 September 1992 2	Viking FK (Norway)	0–0	(Spain) FC Barcelona	Stavanger
		Report		Stadium: Stavanger Stadion; Attendance: 12,401

==== Second round ====
21 October 1992 1	CSKA Moscow (Russia)	1–1	(Spain) FC Barcelona	Moscow
	Grishin 18'	Report	Begiristain 59'	Stadium: Luzhniki Stadium; Attendance: 20,000; Referee: Kurt Röthlisberger (Switzerland)

4 November 1992 2	FC Barcelona (Spain)	2–3	(Russia) CSKA Moscow	Barcelona
	Nadal 12'; Begiristain 31'	report	Bushmanov 44'; Mashkarin 57'; Karsakov 61'	Stadium: Camp Nou; Attendance: 65,000; Referee: Bernd Heynemann (Germany)

=== UEFA Supercup ===
10 February 1993 1	SV Werder Bremen (Germany)	1–1	(Spain) FC Barcelona	Bremen
	Allofs 88'	Report	Salinas 38'	Stadium: Weserstadion; Attendance: 22,098; Referee: Kim Milton Nielsen (Denmark)

10 March 1993 2	FC Barcelona (Spain)	2–1 (3–2 agg.)	(Germany) SV Werder Bremen	Barcelona
	Stoichkov 32'; Goikoetxea 48'	Report	Rufer 41' (pen.)	Stadium: Camp Nou; Attendance: 75,000; Referee: Bo Karlsson (Sweden)

=== Intercontinental Cup ===
13 December 1992	FC Barcelona (Spain)	1–2	(Brazil) São Paulo	Tokyo
12:00 (UTC+09:00)	Stoichkov 12'	Report	Raí 27', 78'	Stadium: National Stadium; Attendance: 60,000; Referee: Juan Carlos Loustau (Argentina)

== Statistics ==
=== Players statistics ===
No.	Pos	Nat	Player	Total		La Liga		Copa del Rey		Champions League	
No.	Pos	Nat	Player	Apps	Goals	Apps	Goals	Apps	Goals	Apps	Goals
	GK	(Spain) ESP	Zubizarreta	48	-42	38	-34	6	-4	4	-4
	DF	(Spain) ESP	Ferrer	41	1	30+1	0	6	1	4	0
	DF	(Netherlands) NED	Koeman	39	11	33	11	3	0	3	0
	DF	(Spain) ESP	Nadal	45	5	31+5	4	5	0	4	1
	MF	(Spain) ESP	Amor	42	6	30+3	5	5	0	3+1	1
	MF	(Spain) ESP	Bakero	43	10	35+2	9	3	1	3	0
	MF	(Spain) ESP	Guardiola	35	1	27+1	0	3	1	4	0
	MF	(Spain) ESP	Eusebio	40	1	26+6	1	4+1	0	2+1	0
	FW	(Denmark) DEN	Laudrup	45	14	37	10	4	4	4	0
	FW	(Bulgaria) BUL	Stoichkov	41	20	34	20	4	0	3	0
	FW	(Spain) ESP	Begiristain	46	19	35+2	15	4+1	2	4	2
	GK	(Spain) ESP	Busquets	0	0	0	0	0	0	0	0
	FW	(Spain) ESP	Goikoetxea	38	3	24+5	3	5	0	3+1	0
	DF	(Spain) ESP	Juan Carlos	30	0	12+12	0	3+1	0	1+1	0
	FW	(Spain) ESP	Salinas	26	10	9+9	5	3+2	5	0+3	0
	MF	(Netherlands) NED	Witschge	22	3	6+11	2	3+1	1	1	0
	DF	(Spain) ESP	Alexanko	9	0	0+7	0	0+2	0	0	0
	DF	(Spain) ESP	Sergi	0	0	0	0	0	0	0	0
	DF	(Spain) ESP	Alfaro	9	1	2+5	1	1+1	0	0	0
	DF	(Spain) ESP	Soler	7	0	3+2	0	1	0	0+1	0
	DF	(Spain) ESP	Carreras	2	1	0+1	0	0+1	1	0	0
	MF	(Croatia) CRO	Vucevic	5	2	1+1	0	1+1	2	1	0
	FW	(Spain) ESP	Maqueda	3	0	2	0	1	0	0	0
	FW	(Spain) ESP	Óscar	4	1	3	0	0+1	1	0	0
	FW	(Spain) ESP	Christiansen	1	0	0	0	1	0	0	0
