= Sánchez Jara =

Spanish footballer

Personal information
- Full name: Francisco Javier Sánchez Ferrer
- Date of birth: 16 September 1969 (age 57)
- Place of birth: Almacelles, Spain
- Height: 1.70 m (5 ft 7 in)
- Position: Right back

Youth career
- –1988: Barcelona

Senior career*
Years	Team	Apps	(Gls)
1988–1989	Barcelona Amateur	34	(2)
1989–1992	Barcelona B	63	(4)
1990–1995	Barcelona	6	(0)
1992–1994	→ Osasuna (loan)	41	(3)
1995–1996	Real Betis	12	(1)
1996–1999	Racing Santander	34	(0)
1999–2001	Sporting de Gijón	43	(1)
2001–2003	Balaguer		
- EFAC Almacelles
Total		233	(11)

Managerial career
- 2014: Córdoba (assistant)
- 2015: Real Mallorca (assistant)
- 2021–: Panama (assistant)
- * Club domestic league appearances and goals

Francisco Javier Sánchez Jara (born 16 September 1969), known simply as Sánchez Jara, is a Spanish retired footballer who played as a right back, and a current coach.

He began his career with Barcelona, but barely played for the first team. He racked up 93 La Liga appearances and four goals across seven seasons with Osasuna, Barcelona, Real Betis and Racing Santander. He began a coaching career in 2014, working as Albert Ferrer's assistant, first at Córdoba, and then Real Mallorca. He is currently the assistant manager of the Panama national team.

== Playing career ==
Sánchez Jara was born in Almacelles, in the comarca of Segrià in Catalonia, and began his career in the youth teams of Catalan giants Barcelona. He played for the C team, Barcelona Amateur, in the 1988–89 Segunda División B season, and was promoted to the B team the following year. He was part of the Barcelona B team that won their Segunda División B group in 1990–91, and earned promotion to the Segunda División. He made his second tier debut with the team in the ensuing campaign, playing 32 matches and scoring twice. He was named as a substitute for the first team several times between 1990 and 1992, but didn't play.

To continue his development, Sánchez Jara was sent on loan to Osasuna for two seasons. He made his La Liga debut with the Pamplona side in 1992–93, and scored six times in his 48 appearances for the club before they suffered relegation at the end of his second season. He then returned to Barcelona, where he played his first games for Johan Cruyff's first team during the 1994–95 season. He played in both legs of the 1994 Supercopa de España, in which Barcelona secured an entertaining 6–5 aggregate victory over Real Zaragoza. He also appeared briefly in Barcelona's UEFA Champions League campaign that season, replacing José Mari Bakero for the last 14 minutes of the 4–0 group stage win over Manchester United.

Sánchez Jara left Barcelona permanently at the end of the season, having played just 10 times for the first team. He joined La Liga rivals Real Betis, with whom he made 15 appearances during the 1995–96 season, including appearing in UEFA Cup matches against Kaiserslautern and Bordeaux. He scored a single goal, in the 3–1 loss to Real Valladolid on the last day of the season. He spent the next three seasons with Racing Santander in the top division, playing 20 times in his first season.

He gradually fell out of favour after that, making 12 appearances in 1997–98 and just eight in his last season at El Sardinero. After failing to score during his time with Los Racinguistas, he decided to drop to the second tier to join Sporting de Gijón for the 1999–2000 campaign. He played 46 times in two years as a Rojiblanco, and scored once, in a 3–0 win over Sevilla on 15 October 2000. Departing El Molinón in the summer of 2001, Sánchez Jara saw out his professional career with two seasons at Balaguer in the Tercera División. Since retiring in 2003, he has appeared on occasion for amateur side EFAC Almacelles in his home town.

== Coaching career ==
When Albert Ferrer was appointed manager of Córdoba in February 2014, he appointed his former Barcelona teammate Sánchez Jara as his assistant. That summer, the pair guided Córdoba to promotion to La Liga for the first time in 42 years after a play-off victory over Las Palmas, but Ferrer was fired just eight matches into the following season.

Sánchez Jara reunited with Ferrer in June 2015, when the latter became manager of Real Mallorca. This was another short tenure, as Ferrer was dismissed in November after just three wins from 15 matches. In 2021, Sánchez Jara joined up with another teammate from his Barcelona days, Thomas Christiansen, becoming assistant manager of the Panama national team.

== Honours ==
Barcelona B

- Segunda División B: 1990–91

Barcelona

- Supercopa de España: 1994

Real Betis

- Trofeo Colombino: 1995

== Career statistics ==
As of 11 February 2021

Club	Season	League			Cup		Europe		Other		Total	
Club	Season	Division	Apps	Goals	Apps	Goals	Apps	Goals	Apps	Goals	Apps	Goals
Barcelona Amateur	1988–89	Segunda División B	34	2	1	0	–		–		35	2
Barcelona B	1989–90	Segunda División B	8	0	1	0	–		–		9	0
Barcelona B	1990–91	Segunda División B	23	2	–		–		5	0	28	2
Barcelona B	1991–92	Segunda División	32	2	–		–		–		32	2
Barcelona B	Total		63	4	1	0	0	0	5	0	69	4
Barcelona	1990–91	La Liga	0	0	0	0	0	0	0	0	0	0
Barcelona	1991–92	La Liga	0	0	0	0	0	0	0	0	0	0
Barcelona	1994–95	La Liga	6	0	1	0	1	0	2	0	10	0
Barcelona	Total		6	0	1	0	1	0	2	0	10	0
Osasuna	1992–93	La Liga	14	1	4	3	–		–		18	4
Osasuna	1993–94	La Liga	27	2	3	0	–		–		30	2
Osasuna	Total		41	3	7	3	0	0	0	0	48	6
Real Betis	1995–96	La Liga	12	1	1	0	2	0	–		15	1
Racing Santander	1996–97	La Liga	18	0	2	0	–		–		20	0
Racing Santander	1997–98	La Liga	11	0	1	0	–		–		12	0
Racing Santander	1998–99	La Liga	5	0	3	0	–		–		8	0
Racing Santander	Total		34	0	6	0	0	0	0	0	40	0
Sporting de Gijón	1999–2000	Segunda División	27	0	3	0	–		–		30	0
Sporting de Gijón	2000–01	Segunda División	16	1	0	0	–		–		16	1
Sporting de Gijón	Total		43	1	3	0	0	0	0	0	46	1
Career total			233	11	20	3	3	0	7	0	263	14

1. Appearances in the 1991 Segunda División B play-offs
2. Appearance in the 1994–95 UEFA Champions League
3. Appearances in the 1994 Supercopa de España
4. Appearances in the 1995–96 UEFA Cup
