= José Mari Bakero =

Spanish footballer and manager

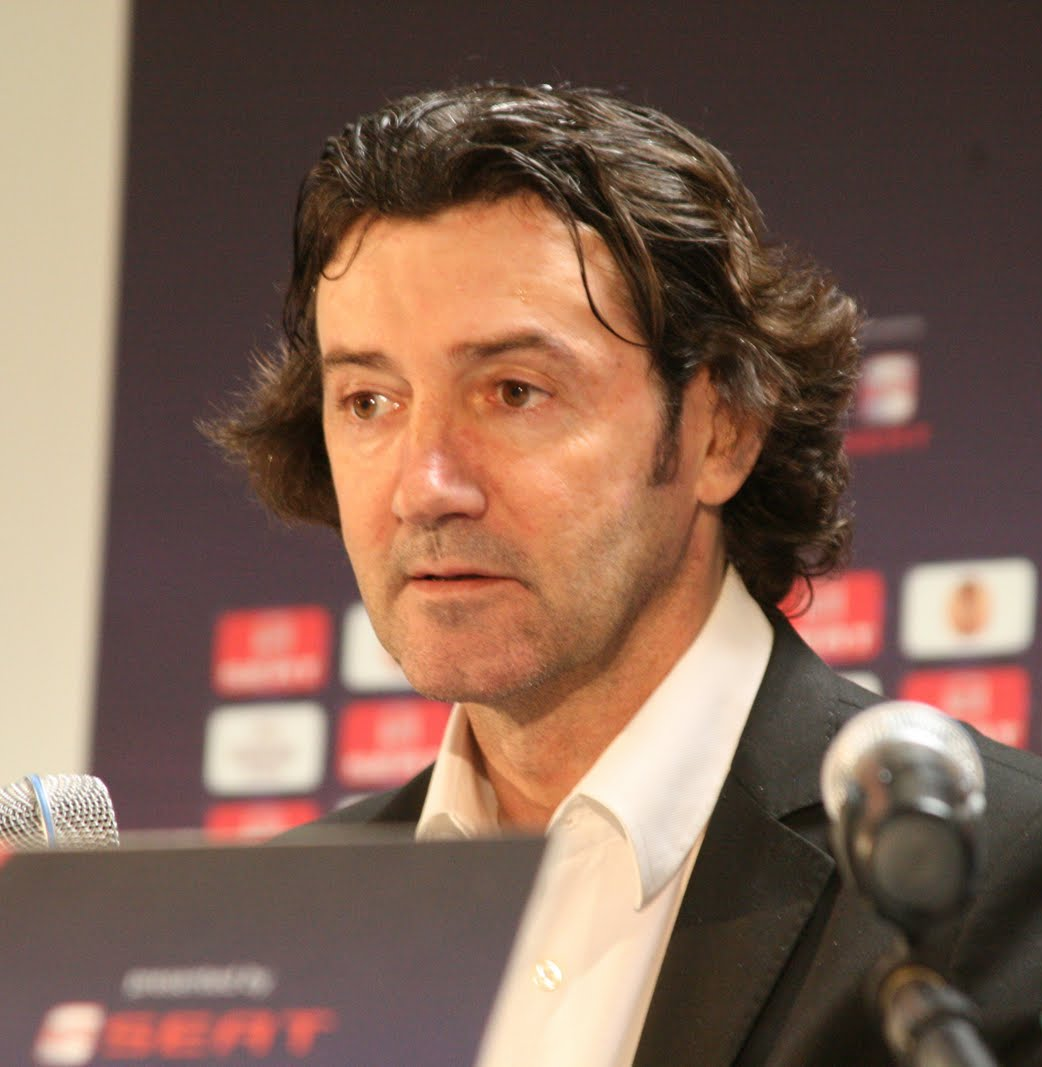
- Bakero in 2010

Personal information
- Full name: José María Bakero Escudero
- Date of birth: 11 February 1963 (age 63)
- Place of birth: Goizueta, Spain
- Height: 1.69 m (5 ft 7 in)
- Position: Attacking midfielder

Youth career
- Real Sociedad

Senior career*
Years	Team	Apps	(Gls)
1980–1988	Real Sociedad	223	(67)
1988–1996	Barcelona	260	(72)
1997	Veracruz	17	(3)
Total		500	(142)

International career
1980	Spain U16	3	(1)
1980–1981	Spain U18	9	(2)
1982–1986	Spain U21	5	(1)
1986	Spain U23	1	(0)
1987–1994	Spain	30	(7)

Managerial career
- 1999: Puebla
- 2005: Málaga B
- 2006: Real Sociedad
- 2009–2010: Polonia Warsaw
- 2010–2012: Lech Poznań
- 2013: Juan Aurich
- 2023: Slavia Sofia
- * Club domestic league appearances and goals

José María Bakero Escudero (born 11 February 1963) is a Spanish former professional footballer who played mainly as an attacking midfielder, currently a manager.

In a 17-year career, spent mainly with Real Sociedad and Barcelona, he amassed La Liga totals of 483 games and 139 goals, winning a total of 17 titles. A Spain international for seven years, he represented the nation in two World Cups and Euro 1988.

Bakero began working as a manager in 1999.

== Club career ==
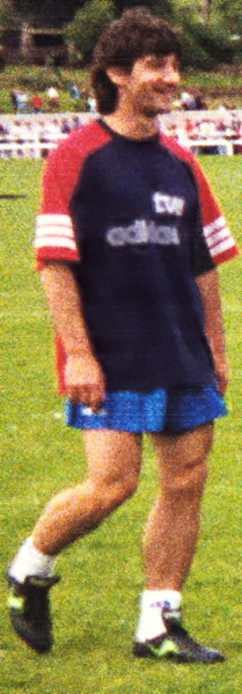
Bakero training with Spain in 1994

Born in Goizueta, Navarre, Bakero made his senior debut with Real Sociedad on 6 September 1980 when only 17, coming from the bench in a 3–2 away loss against Valencia, and finished his debut season with 27 scoreless appearances. Featuring only in two games in 1981–82 due to a serious injury, he was however part of the Basque sides that won back-to-back La Liga titles, his teammates including Luis Arconada, Jesús María Satrústegui and Jesús María Zamora.

Bakero then signed for Barcelona, where he was joined by several other Real and Basque players: Txiki Begiristain, Luis López Rekarte, with Julio Salinas coming from Atlético Madrid but having also played with Athletic Bilbao, as another Real player, Jon Andoni Goikoetxea, joined two years later – they would form the backbone of the legendary Dream Team. He (who scored 47 league goals in his first four years) played 347 competitive matches for the Catalans during his spell, being instrumental in their league conquests from 1990 to 1994 and also appearing in the historic 1992 European Cup final; in the latter tournament, as his team was trailing 3–0 at 1. FC Kaiserslautern in the second round after a 2–0 home win, his 90th-minute header secured qualification.

Having appeared scarcely during 1996–97, his last game coming on 18 November 1996 in a 6–1 home thrashing of Real Valladolid in which he scored, Bakero retired later that campaign after a small abroad stint with Mexico's Veracruz. He also had unsuccessful trials with Middlesbrough and Norwich City.

== International career ==
Bakero earned 30 caps for Spain, netting on seven occasions. His debut came on 14 October 1987 during an UEFA Euro 1988 qualifier against Austria, replacing future Barcelona teammate Francisco Carrasco in a 2–0 home win.

Bakero would subsequently represent the nation at Euro 1988, as well as in two FIFA World Cup editions, 1990 and 1994.

== Player profile ==
Bakero began his career as a forward, not being a prolific scorer, but was converted into an attacking midfielder. He possessed passing and scoring ability (with both his right foot and his head, the second despite his short stature) and great leadership skills.

== Coaching career ==
Bakero moved into management after retiring in 1997, first as an assistant under both Lorenzo Serra Ferrer and Louis van Gaal. He also worked as a sports adviser with the Generalitat de Catalunya and, in 2004–05, had his second head coaching experience, joining Málaga's B side in January 2005 and helping them narrowly escape relegation from Segunda División.

In August 2005, Bakero was appointed director of football at Real Sociedad, and would be promoted to coach towards the end of 2005–06. Seven games into the following season, he was sacked.

In October 2007, Bakero joined Ronald Koeman's (another Barcelona teammate) coaching staff at Valencia, being dismissed in late April 2008. On 10 November 2009, more than a year after his last job, he signed with Polonia Warsaw, again as head coach. While the team was last in the league at that point, not only did he manage to prevent relegation but also led them to a win against city neighbours Legia Warsaw, the first in ten years. He was relieved of his duties on 13 September 2010, after suffering the first loss of the campaign.

Bakero signed with another club in the Ekstraklasa on 3 November 2010, now Lech Poznań. In his official debut, he led the side to a 3–1 victory over Manchester City in the group stage of the UEFA Europa League.

On 25 February 2012, following a 3–0 away loss to Ruch Chorzów, Bakero was fired. In 2013, he moved to South America to coach Juan Aurich from Peru, being dismissed in September of that year due to poor results.

In 2015, Venezuelan club Deportivo La Guaira hired Bakero as interim technical director, to help the new coaching staff by running training sessions. He returned to Barcelona on 10 July 2017, as head of the youth academy alongside former teammate Guillermo Amor.

On 19 June 2023, Bakero became manager of Slavia Sofia in the First Professional Football League (Bulgaria). In September, having collected six losses and one draw in seven matches, he was fired.

== Personal life ==
Bakero was the third of 11 children. His brothers Santiago and Jon were also footballers, and both forwards. After he joined Polonia as a coach he was accompanied, at his request, by Jon as an assistant.

Bakero's sister, Itziar, was also a footballer, who played at international level. His son, Jon, played college soccer in the United States for Wake Forest University, winning the Hermann Trophy in 2017.

== Career statistics ==
=== Club ===
Appearances and goals by club, season and competition
Club	Season	League			Copa del Rey (Note: Includes Copa del Rey)		League cup (Note: Includes Copa de la Liga)		Continental		Other		Total	
Club	Season	Division	Apps	Goals	Apps	Goals	Apps	Goals	Apps	Goals	Apps	Goals	Apps	Goals
Real Sociedad	1980–81	La Liga	27	0	2	0	—		2 (Note: Appearances in UEFA Cup)	0	—		31	0
Real Sociedad	1981–82	La Liga	2	0	0	0	—		2 (Note: Appearances in European Cup/UEFA Champions League)	0	—		4	0
Real Sociedad	1982–83	La Liga	33	4	5	1	—		6	1	2 (Note: Appearances in Supercopa de España)	0	46	6
Real Sociedad	1983–84	La Liga	31	10	8	2	4	1	—		—		43	13
Real Sociedad	1984–85	La Liga	30	9	8	4	2	0	—		—		40	13
Real Sociedad	1985–86	La Liga	29	16	4	3	—		—		—		33	19
Real Sociedad	1986–87	La Liga	39	11	8	4	—		—		—		47	15
Real Sociedad	1987–88	La Liga	32	17	8	7	—		4 (Note: Appearances in European Cup Winners' Cup)	0	—		44	24
Real Sociedad	Total		223	67	43	21	6	1	14	1	2	0	288	90
Barcelona	1988–89	La Liga	22	10	0	0	—		6	2	2	2	30	14
Barcelona	1989–90	La Liga	30	13	7	1	—		2	0	2 (Note: Appearances in European Supercup)	0	41	14
Barcelona	1990–91	La Liga	34	13	4	1	—		6	1	0	0	44	15
Barcelona	1991–92	La Liga	33	11	1	0	—		9	3	1	1	44	15
Barcelona	1992–93	La Liga	37	9	3	1	—		3	0	5 (Note: Two appearances in European Supercup, one appearance in Intercontinental Cup, two appearances in Supercopa de España)	0	48	10
Barcelona	1993–94	La Liga	34	5	1	0	—		9	2	2	1	46	8
Barcelona	1994–95	La Liga	34	4	0	0	—		7	3	1	0	42	7
Barcelona	1995–96	La Liga	32	6	4	1	—		10	3	—		46	10
Barcelona	1996–97	La Liga	4	1	0	0	—		1	0	1	0	6	1
Barcelona	Total		260	72	20	4	—		53	14	14	4	347	94
Career total			483	139	63	25	6	1	67	15	16	4	635	184

=== International ===
Scores and results list Spain's goal tally first, score column indicates score after each Bakero goal.

List of international goals scored by José Mari Bakero
No.	Date	Venue	Opponent	Score	Result	Competition
1	18 November 1987	Benito Villamarín, Seville, Spain	Albania	1–0	5–0	Euro 1988 qualifying
2	18 November 1987	Benito Villamarín, Seville, Spain	Albania	2–0	5–0	Euro 1988 qualifying
3	18 November 1987	Benito Villamarín, Seville, Spain	Albania	5–0	5–0	Euro 1988 qualifying
4	19 December 1990	Sánchez Pizjuán, Seville, Spain	Albania	9–0	9–0	Euro 1992 qualifying
5	20 February 1991	Parc des Princes, Paris, France	France	1–0	1–3	Euro 1992 qualifying
6	16 December 1992	Sánchez Pizjuán, Seville, Spain	Latvia	1–0	5–0	1994 World Cup qualification
7	24 February 1993	Benito Villamarín, Seville, Spain	Lithuania	2–0	5–0	1994 World Cup qualification

== Managerial statistics ==
As of 8 September 2013

Team	From	To	Competition	Record							
Team	From	To	Competition	G	W	D	L	Win %	GF	GA	GD
Puebla	July 1999	September 1999	Liga MX	8	1	3	4	12.50	6	11	–5
Puebla	July 1999	September 1999	Total	8	1	3	4	12.50	6	11	–5
Málaga B	January 2005	August 2005	Segunda División	22	6	6	10	27.27	13	25	–12
Málaga B	January 2005	August 2005	Total	22	6	6	10	27.27	13	25	–12
Real Sociedad	23 March 2006	26 October 2006	La Liga	16	3	5	8	18.75	18	24	–6
Real Sociedad	23 March 2006	26 October 2006	Copa del Rey	1	0	0	1	0.00	1	4	–3
Real Sociedad	23 March 2006	26 October 2006	Total	17	3	5	9	17.65	19	28	–9
Polonia Warsaw	10 November 2009	13 September 2010	Ekstraklasa	22	9	6	7	40.91	23	20	+3
Polonia Warsaw	10 November 2009	13 September 2010	Total	22	9	6	7	40.91	23	20	+3
Lech Poznań	3 November 2010	25 February 2012	Ekstraklasa	39	18	8	13	46.15	53	27	+26
Lech Poznań	3 November 2010	25 February 2012	Polish Cup	7	4	2	1	57.14	13	7	+6
Lech Poznań	3 November 2010	25 February 2012	Europe	5	3	1	1	60.00	6	4	+2
Lech Poznań	3 November 2010	25 February 2012	Total	51	25	11	15	49.02	72	38	+34
Juan Aurich	5 January 2013	7 September 2013	Peruvian Primera División	31	8	9	14	25.81	38	39	–1
Juan Aurich	5 January 2013	7 September 2013	Copa Sudamericana	2	0	0	2	0.00	2	6	–4
Juan Aurich	5 January 2013	7 September 2013	Total	33	8	9	16	24.24	40	45	–5
Career totals			League	138	45	37	56	32.61	151	146	+5
Career totals			Cup	8	4	2	2	50.00	14	11	+3
Career totals			Europe	5	3	1	1	60.00	6	4	+2
Career totals			South America	2	0	0	2	0.00	2	6	–4
Career totals			Total	153	52	40	61	33.99	173	167	+6

== Honours ==
Real Sociedad

- La Liga: 1980–81, 1981–82
- Copa del Rey: 1986–87
- Supercopa de España: 1982

Barcelona

- La Liga: 1990–91, 1991–92, 1992–93, 1993–94
- Copa del Rey: 1989–90
- Supercopa de España: 1991, 1992, 1994, 1996
- European Cup: 1991–92
- UEFA Cup Winners' Cup: 1988–89, 1996–97
- UEFA Super Cup: 1992

== See also ==
- List of FC Barcelona players (100+ appearances)
- List of La Liga players (400+ appearances)
