= Miguel Ángel Nadal =

Spanish footballer

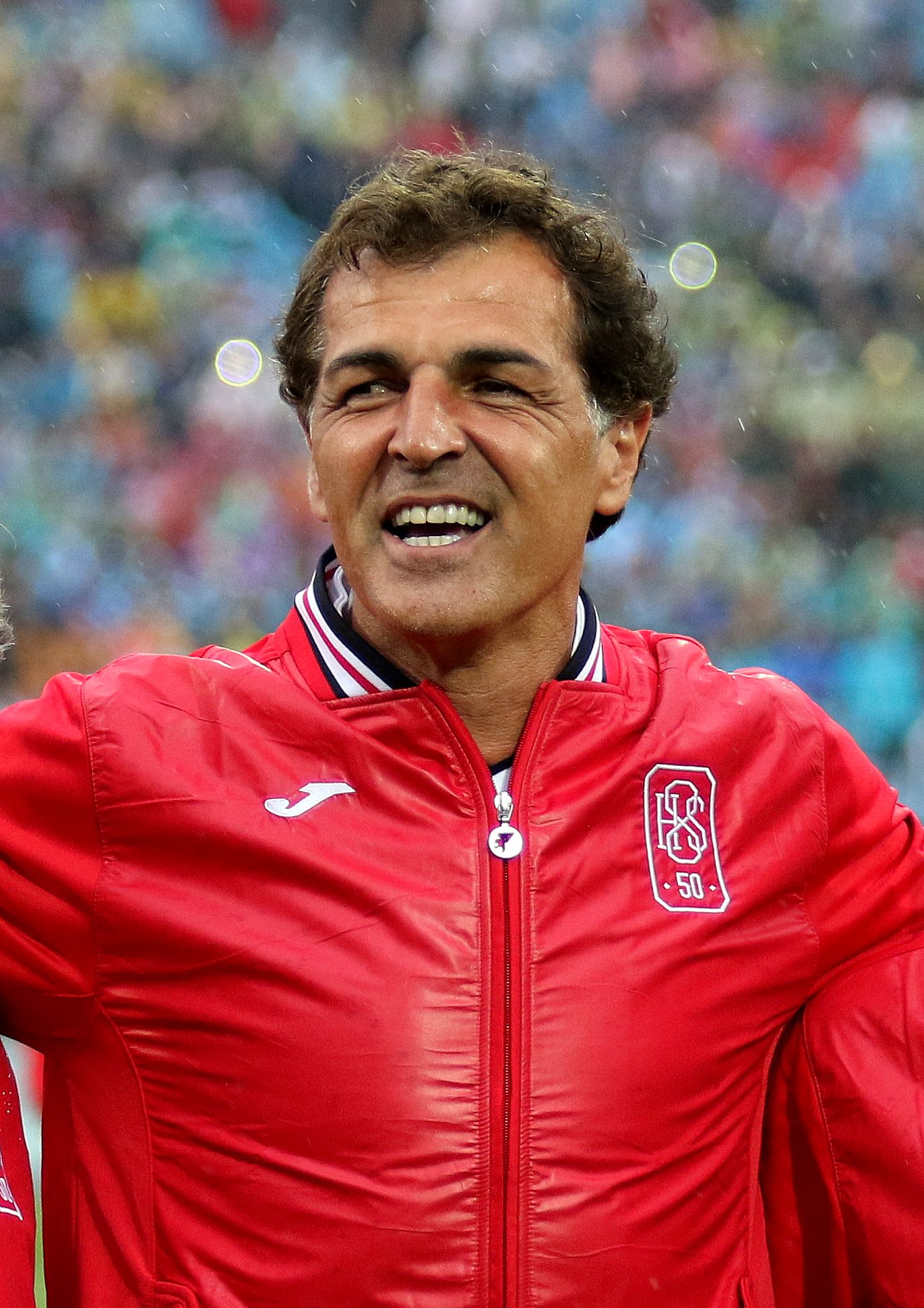
- Nadal in 2016

Personal information
- Full name: Miguel Ángel Nadal Homar
- Date of birth: 28 July 1966 (age 60)
- Place of birth: Manacor, Spain
- Height: 1.87 m (6 ft 2 in)
- Positions: Defender; midfielder

Youth career
- 1980–1983: Manacor

Senior career*
Years	Team	Apps	(Gls)
1983–1986	Manacor	61	(13)
1986–1987	Mallorca B	20	(1)
1987–1991	Mallorca	130	(22)
1991–1999	Barcelona	208	(13)
1999–2005	Mallorca	155	(6)
Total		574	(55)

International career
1991–2002	Spain	62	(3)
2002	Balearic Islands	1	(0)

Managerial career
- 2010–2011: Mallorca (assistant)
- 2011: Mallorca (caretaker)
- * Club domestic league appearances and goals

Miguel Ángel Nadal Homar (Spanish pronunciation: [miˈɣel ˈaŋxel naˈðal oˈmaɾ], Catalan: Miquel Àngel Nadal Homar; born 28 July 1966) is a Spanish former professional footballer who played as a versatile defender and midfielder.

He began and ended his career with Mallorca, but his greatest achievements came whilst at Barcelona during the so-called Dream Team era, winning numerous domestic and continental titles. Over 19 seasons, he played 493 matches (463 of those in La Liga).

A part of the Spain national team's setup during the 1990s and early 2000s, Nadal represented the nation in three World Cups and Euro 1996.

== Club career ==
Born in Manacor, Mallorca, Balearic Islands, Nadal made his debut in La Liga with local RCD Mallorca, first appearing on 19 April 1987 against FC Barcelona at the Camp Nou. In his final two seasons, after helping in a 1989 promotion from Segunda División, he scored 12 goals from 72 league appearances, thus being signed by the Catalonia club for the 1991–92 campaign.

With Barça, under Johan Cruyff, Nadal was a very important part as they won five leagues, two Copa del Rey and the 1992 European Cup, playing 297 overall games and occupying several defensive positions in both the back-four and in midfield. In his last year, however, ostracised by another Dutch coach, Louis van Gaal, he only totalled five matches; in 1996 and 1997 he was linked with a transfer to Manchester United, but the move to the Premier League never materialised.

Nadal returned to Mallorca subsequently, starting most of the time and also winning the 2003 Spanish Cup after beating Recreativo de Huelva. He retired aged 38, with 645 competitive appearances to his credit.

In July 2010, five years after his retirement, Nadal returned to Mallorca, joining the coaching staff under Michael Laudrup, his Barcelona teammate for three seasons. As the Dane left the club in late September 2011 following a run-in with director Lorenzo Serra Ferrer, Nadal was in charge for one game, a 2–2 away draw against CA Osasuna, but he too left the following week.

== International career ==
Nadal earned 62 caps for Spain, his debut coming on 13 November 1991 in a UEFA Euro 1992 qualifier dead rubber against Czechoslovakia (the national team had virtually no chances of reaching the finals in Sweden). He went on to represent the country in three FIFA World Cups.

Additionally, Nadal missed a penalty at Wembley Stadium against England, in a Euro 1996 shootout loss. After appearing in four complete matches at the 2002 World Cup, at almost 36, he retired from the international scene.

Nadal also featured once for the Balearic Islands regional team, in a friendly with Malta held at Son Moix.

== Style of play ==
A versatile player, Nadal was capable of playing either as a defender or midfielder; nicknamed The Beast, he based his game on physical display. He was also known for his strong aerial game and tactical sense.

In 2007, The Times placed Nadal at number 47 in their list of the 50 hardest footballers in history.

== Personal life ==
Nadal is the paternal uncle of professional tennis player Rafael Nadal, whilst his brother Toni was Rafael's coach.

== Career statistics ==
Scores and results list Spain's goal tally first, score column indicates score after each Nadal goal.

List of international goals scored by Miguel Ángel Nadal
No.	Date	Venue	Opponent	Score	Result	Competition
1	16 November 1994	Ramón Sánchez-Pizjuán Stadium, Seville, Spain	Denmark	1–0	3–0	UEFA Euro 1996 qualifying
2	30 November 1994	Estadio La Rosaleda, Málaga, Spain	Finland	1–0	2–0	Friendly
3	5 September 2001	Rheinpark Stadion, Vaduz, Liechtenstein	Liechtenstein	2–0	2–0	2002 FIFA World Cup qualification

== Honours ==
Barcelona

- La Liga: 1991–92, 1992–93, 1993–94, 1997–98, 1998–99
- Copa del Rey: 1996–97, 1997–98
- Supercopa de España: 1991, 1992, 1994, 1996
- European Cup: 1991–92
- UEFA Cup Winners' Cup: 1996–97
- UEFA Super Cup: 1992, 1997

Mallorca

- Copa del Rey: 2002–03

== See also ==
- List of FC Barcelona players (100+ appearances)
- List of La Liga players (400+ appearances)
