= Carles Busquets =

Spanish footballer (born 1967)

Personal information
- Full name: Carles Busquets Barroso
- Date of birth: 19 July 1967 (age 59)
- Place of birth: Barcelona, Spain
- Height: 1.81 m (5 ft 11 in)
- Position: Goalkeeper

Youth career
- 1981–1983: Ciutat Badia
- 1983–1985: Barcelona

Senior career*
Years	Team	Apps	(Gls)
1985–1988	Barcelona C	31	(0)
1988–1992	Barcelona B	55	(0)
1990–1999	Barcelona	79	(0)
1999–2002	Lleida	108	(0)
Total		273	(0)

International career
1983	Spain U16	3	(0)
- * Club domestic league appearances and goals

Carles Busquets Barroso (Catalan: [busˈkɛts]; born 19 July 1967) is a Spanish former professional footballer who played as a goalkeeper, mostly for Barcelona.

== Club career ==
Born in Barcelona, Catalonia, Busquets was a Barcelona graduate who joined from neighbouring Ciutat Badia and possessed very good technical skills for a player in his position. He made his La Liga debut for the first team on 7 November 1993 in a 2–1 home win against Racing de Santander, going on to appear in the following two games. However, he was mostly back-up for Spanish international Andoni Zubizarreta during his first years; he did manage to feature in the final of the 1990–91 European Cup Winners' Cup, a 2–1 loss to Manchester United with two goals from Mark Hughes.

Busquets totalled 69 league matches over two seasons after Zubizarreta left for Valencia, and was also on goal in the 4–0 victory over Manchester United in the group stage of 1994–95's UEFA Champions League, but during this period Barça failed to win any silverware. The following campaigns he was again second choice, first to Portugal's Vítor Baía then Dutchman Ruud Hesp, and also clashed with new manager Louis van Gaal.

Until his retirement in October 2002, Busquets played a further four seasons with neighbouring Lleida, spending two apiece in the Segunda División and Segunda División B. He joined Barcelona's coaching staff afterwards, and worked with the goalkeepers.

== Playing style ==
Originally a forward at the start of his career until he had to replace an injured goalkeeper, Busquets notably excelled in footplay. Branded by French newspaper L'Équipe as "the goalkeeper with no hands", he has been considered a forefather of this type of play. His style was dismissed by some as less suitable for football than for handball.

Busquets' reputation of being nearly unbeatable in these situations tended to be overshadowed by his occasional baffling blunders. However, he was able to keep the number of goals he conceded below the number of games he played in 1995–96, his final season as Barcelona's first choice, and retrospectively Johan Cruyff considered him one of the club's most secure goalkeepers in the modern era.

Busquets wore tracksuit trousers instead of shorts while playing, even during hot weather. This piqued the attention of the public to the extent that some fans speculated that he was trying to hide a scar, burn or tattoo. He explained that after getting used to wearing them in training he decided to use them in matches as well, as he felt safer from knee injuries that way.

== Personal life ==
Busquets' son, Sergio, was also a product of Barcelona's youth system and played as a defensive midfielder.

== Honours ==
Barcelona

- La Liga: 1993–94, 1997–98
- Copa del Rey: 1996–97
- Supercopa de España: 1991, 1992, 1994, 1996
- European Cup: 1991–92; runner-up: 1993–94
- UEFA Cup Winners' Cup: 1996–97; runner-up: 1990–91
- UEFA Super Cup: 1992, 1997
