= Richard Witschge =

Dutch footballer (born 1969)

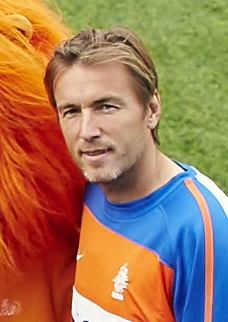
- Witschge in 2013

Personal information
- Full name: Richard Peter Witschge
- Date of birth: 20 September 1969 (age 57)
- Place of birth: Amsterdam, Netherlands
- Height: 1.82 m (6 ft 0 in)
- Position: Midfielder

Youth career
- SDW
- Ajax

Senior career*
Years	Team	Apps	(Gls)
1986–1991	Ajax	87	(3)
1991–1993	Barcelona	40	(2)
1993–1996	Bordeaux	77	(9)
1995	→ Blackburn Rovers (loan)	1	(0)
1996–2003	Ajax	139	(12)
2001–2002	→ Alavés (loan)	26	(1)
2003	ADO '20		
2004	Oita Trinita	9	(0)
Total		379	(27)

International career
1990–2000	Netherlands	31	(1)
- * Club domestic league appearances and goals

Richard Peter Witschge (born 20 September 1969) is a Dutch former professional footballer who played as a midfielder. He was known for his technique and passing ability.

In an 18-year professional career he played mainly for Ajax, but also represented, amongst other clubs, Barcelona. In 11 seasons in the Eredivisie, he amassed totals of 226 matches and 15 goals.

Witschge represented the Netherlands in the 1990 World Cup and Euro 1996.

== Club career ==
=== Ajax ===
Witschge was born in Amsterdam, North Holland. A product of local club Ajax's prolific youth ranks under Johan Cruyff, he first appeared in the Eredivisie on 26 October 1986 at the age of 17, and scored his first league goal approximately a year later. His older brother Rob was already playing for the club.

=== Barcelona ===
After becoming established in the first team, Witschge signed for Cruyff's Barcelona in 1991. The manager later admitted to deliberately overpaying for him, as a favour to Ajax's incoming board of directors headed by his associate Michael van Praag.

Witschge featured sparingly during his tenure, as the Catalans won back-to-back La Liga championships. He made his debut in the competition on 14 September 1991, playing the full 90 minutes in a 3–1 home win against Real Zaragoza. He faced intense competition for playing time as the three allotted slots for foreign players were usually taken up by Michael Laudrup, Hristo Stoichkov and his compatriot Ronald Koeman, and an injury ruled him out of the 1992 European Cup Final.

=== Bordeaux ===
Witschge's frustration with this state of affairs at the Camp Nou led him to take a substantial pay cut in joining Bordeaux for 18 million francs in 1993. Initially, the move was unsuccessful, as he was unhappy with his accommodation and clashed with his coaches over their tactics. Amidst ineffectual performances, he was booed by his own supporters, and eventually dropped from the squad.

Witschge moved to Blackburn Rovers on loan just ahead of the transfer deadline in March 1995, featuring against West Ham United, as his team won the Premier League title. He had been intended as a replacement for injured left winger Jason Wilcox, but manager Kenny Dalglish preferred the more conservative option of pushing left-back Graeme Le Saux forward, bringing Jeff Kenna into the defence. An unimpressed Witschge later made an outspoken attack on Blackburn, branding the Lancashire town and its inhabitants "poor and ugly".

Upon his return to Bordeaux, Witschge found conditions under new coach Slavoljub Muslin much more congenial, resulting in a sharp upturn in his form. He scored seven league goals and figured prominently in the team which reached the final of the UEFA Cup, after qualifying for the competition through the 1995 UEFA Intertoto Cup.

=== Later years ===
In May 1996, Witschge agreed a return to Ajax, who wanted his experience to bolster the team which had begun to break up in the aftermath of their 1995 European Cup win. In his second spell he played more than 150 matches, helping the club win two leagues and consecutive domestic cups. After falling into dispute with veteran coach Co Adriaanse, who preferred the younger Rafael van der Vaart in his role, he was loaned to Spanish top-flight side Alavés for the 2001–02 season.

After leaving Ajax for a second time in 2003, Witschge had short spells with amateurs ADO '20 in Heemskerk and Oita Trinita in Japan. After a failed trial at Rangers, he retired in June 2004, at nearly 35 years of age.

Witschge returned to the Amsterdam Arena as a youth coach in 2013.

== International career ==
Witschge earned 31 caps for the Netherlands, in which he scored one goal. He made his debut on 21 February 1990 in a 0–0 friendly draw against Italy, and was picked for the 1990 FIFA World Cup under manager Leo Beenhakker.

An injury sustained with Barcelona ruled him out of UEFA Euro 1992 and he did not make another major tournament until Euro 1996, held in England. During this time, his place in the national team was taken by his older brother.

Witschge's initial spell in the national team yielded 19 appearances and one goal, between February 1990 and March 1992. As he subsequently dropped out of contention there was a perception that he had failed to fulfill his early talent, with Beenhakker attributing laziness and immaturity when he bracketed the player alongside contemporaries including Bryan Roy in the Patatgeneratie (English: French Fries Generation), the implication being that they ate junk food instead of focusing on improvement.

After an upturn in his fortunes at club level, Witschge was called back in September 1995 during the nation's faltering Euro 1996 qualifying campaign. He attended the play-off tie against the Republic of Ireland in Liverpool, but was not ultimately selected. In the finals, Witschge was preferred over Edgar Davids by Guus Hiddink, contributing to his teammate's frustration and eventual expulsion from the squad.

In September 2000, Witschge returned to the national team after a three-year absence due to an injury crisis. He won his final cap in a 2–2 home draw with the Republic of Ireland, which dented the Netherlands' qualification prospects for the 2002 World Cup.

== Personal life ==
Witschge's older brother, Rob, was also a footballer and a midfielder.

Richard is related to Dutch actor Cor Witschge (1925-1991); Richard's grandfather was a cousin of Cor.

== Career statistics ==
=== Club ===
Appearances and goals by club, season and competition
Club	Season	League		
Club	Season	Division	Apps	Goals
Ajax	1986–87	Eredivisie	2	0
Ajax	1987–88	Eredivisie	10	1
Ajax	1988–89	Eredivisie	14	0
Ajax	1989–90	Eredivisie	28	2
Ajax	1990–91	Eredivisie	33	0
Ajax	Total		87	3
Barcelona	1991–92	La Liga	23	0
Barcelona	1992–93	La Liga	17	2
Barcelona	Total		40	2
Bordeaux	1993–94	Ligue 1	27	1
Bordeaux	1994–95	Ligue 1	17	1
Bordeaux	1995–96	Ligue 1	33	7
Bordeaux	Total		77	9
Blackburn Rovers (loan)	1994–95	Premier League	1	0
Ajax	1996–97	Eredivisie	21	3
Ajax	1997–98	Eredivisie	29	2
Ajax	1998–99	Eredivisie	32	2
Ajax	1999–2000	Eredivisie	20	2
Ajax	2000–01	Eredivisie	15	2
Ajax	2002–03	Eredivisie	22	1
Ajax	Total		139	12
Alavés (loan)	2001–02	La Liga	26	1
ADO '20	2003–04	Topklasse		
Oita Trinita	2004	J1 League	9	0
Career total			379	27

=== International ===
Appearances and goals by national team and year
National team	Year	Apps	Goals
Netherlands	1990	11	0
Netherlands	1991	6	1
Netherlands	1992	2	0
Netherlands	1993	0	0
Netherlands	1994	0	0
Netherlands	1995	3	0
Netherlands	1996	7	0
Netherlands	1997	1	0
Netherlands	1998	0	0
Netherlands	1999	0	0
Netherlands	2000	1	0
Total		31	1

Scores and results list Netherlands' goal tally first, score column indicates score after each Witschge goal.

List of international goals scored by Richard Witschge
No.	Date	Venue	Opponent	Score	Result	Competition
1	16 October 1991	De Kuip, Rotterdam, Netherlands	Portugal	1–0	1–0	UEFA Euro 1992 qualifying

== Honours ==
Barcelona

- La Liga: 1991–92, 1992–93
- European Cup: 1991–92
- European Super Cup: 1992

Bordeaux

- UEFA Intertoto Cup: 1995

Ajax

- Eredivisie: 1997–98
- KNVB Cup: 1997–98, 1998–99

Blackburn Rovers

- Premier League: 1994-1995
