= Sergi Barjuán =

Spanish association football manager (born 1971)

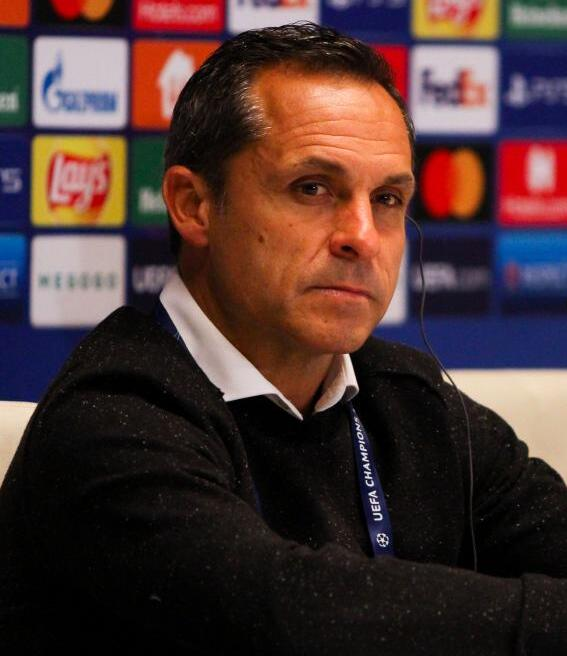
- Barjuán in 2021

Personal information
- Full name: Sergi Barjuán Esclusa
- Date of birth: 28 December 1971 (age 54)
- Place of birth: Les Franqueses, Spain
- Height: 1.72 m (5 ft 8 in)
- Position: Left-back

Youth career
- 1978–1988: Granollers
- 1988–1990: Barcelona

Senior career*
Years	Team	Apps	(Gls)
1990–1992	Barcelona C	33	(4)
1992–1993	Barcelona B	42	(4)
1993–2002	Barcelona	267	(6)
2002–2005	Atlético Madrid	86	(0)
Total		428	(14)

International career
1990	Spain U18	1	(0)
1993–1994	Spain U21	5	(0)
1994–2002	Spain	56	(1)
1998–2004	Catalonia	4	(0)

Managerial career
- 2009–2011: Barcelona (youth)
- 2012–2014: Recreativo
- 2015: Almería
- 2017: Mallorca
- 2017–2019: Zhejiang Greentown
- 2021–2022: Barcelona B
- 2021: Barcelona (interim)
Medal record
Men's football
Representing Spain
UEFA European Under-21 Championship
Bronze medal – third place	1994 France
- * Club domestic league appearances and goals

Sergi Barjuán Esclusa (born 28 December 1971), known simply as Sergi as a player, is a Spanish former professional footballer who played as a left-back, currently a manager.

Best known for his Barcelona stint, he played for the first team for nine seasons and made a major contribution to the winning of nine major titles. Having reached the Spain national team shortly after making his professional club debut, he appeared in two World Cups and as many European Championships.

In 2009, Barjuán embarked on a managerial career, leading Recreativo, Almería and Mallorca. He also had brief La Liga spells at the second of those clubs, and in interim charge of Barcelona.

== Club career ==
Born in Les Franqueses del Vallès, Barcelona, Catalonia, Sergi was a youth product of giants FC Barcelona. He had not yet appeared in La Liga when he was summoned by first-team manager Johan Cruyff to a UEFA Champions League group stage game away against Galatasaray S.K. (0–0, on 24 November 1993), and from then on became the side's undisputed first choice, never playing less than 31 matches until 1999; with Barça he won three leagues, two Copa del Rey and two Supercopa de España, adding the 1997 edition of the UEFA Cup Winners' Cup and the subsequent UEFA Super Cup, partnered in the other defensive wing by another youth graduate, Albert Ferrer.

After being deemed surplus to requirements by coach Louis van Gaal, Sergi joined Atlético Madrid, where he still posted three respectable seasons although he collected 34 yellow cards and one red.

== International career ==
Shortly after having been promoted into Barcelona's main squad, Sergi made his debut for Spain on 9 February 1994, in a friendly with Poland in Santa Cruz de Tenerife in which he scored his only international goal. He went on to represent the nation at the 1994 FIFA World Cup, UEFA Euro 1996, the 1998 World Cup and Euro 2000, for a total of 56 caps.

== Coaching career ==
=== Barcelona (youth) ===
In July 2009, after several years working in marketing and running football camps for youngsters, Barjuán returned to Barcelona, being named its Juvenil B manager. During his spell he coached Gerard Deulofeu, Patric and Rafinha, whom eventually starred for the senior team.

=== Recreativo ===
Barjuán was handed his first job in the professionals on 22 May 2012, signing for three years with Recreativo de Huelva in the Segunda División. On his debut on 18 August, he lost 2–0 at Xerez CD.

In his second year at El Decano, Barjuán missed out on a play-off place on the final day. He then cancelled his contract in June 2014 and was replaced by José Luis Oltra.

=== Almería ===
Barjuán was appointed manager of UD Almería on 6 April 2015, taking over from Juan Ignacio Martínez who had been fired. His first game in charge occurred two days later, a 4–0 away loss to former club Barcelona.

On 3 October 2015, with the Andalusians back in the second tier, Barjuán was dismissed after a 2–2 home draw against CD Tenerife.

=== Mallorca ===
Barjuán resumed his career in April 2017, at RCD Mallorca. He left when his contract expired at the end of the season, with the Balearic side relegated to Segunda División B for the first time in 36 years.

=== Zhejiang Greentown ===
On 26 November 2017, the 45-year-old Barjuán moved abroad for the first time in his career, taking the helm at China League One club Zhejiang Greentown F.C. for the next two seasons. He lost his job on 4 July 2019 after a run of two wins from ten left the team in sixth place.

=== Barcelona B ===
In June 2021, Barjuán was appointed at FC Barcelona Atlètic on a two-year deal, replacing Francisco Javier García Pimienta. On 28 October, after the dismissal of Ronald Koeman, he was put in interim charge of the main squad. Two days later, on his debut, he oversaw a 1–1 home draw with Deportivo Alavés. In his second game, he won 1–0 at FC Dynamo Kyiv in the Champions League group stage.

After missing out on a playoff place for the 2021–22 season, Barjuán was dismissed. He remained at Barcelona and was put in charge of their global academies in October.

== Career statistics ==
=== Club ===
Appearances and goals by club, season and competition
Club	Season	League			National cup		Europe		Total	
Club	Season	Division	Apps	Goals	Apps	Goals	Apps	Goals	Apps	Goals
Barcelona	1993–94	La Liga	23	0	4	1	8	0	35	1
Barcelona	1994–95	La Liga	34	1	3	0	8	0	45	1
Barcelona	1995–96	La Liga	40	0	6	0	7	2	53	2
Barcelona	1996–97	La Liga	34	1	8	0	7	0	49	1
Barcelona	1997–98	La Liga	31	2	8	1	8	0	47	3
Barcelona	1998–99	La Liga	35	0	5	1	5	0	45	1
Barcelona	1999–2000	La Liga	19	1	6	0	6	0	31	1
Barcelona	2000–01	La Liga	33	1	6	0	13	0	52	1
Barcelona	2001–02	La Liga	18	0	0	0	7	0	25	0
Barcelona	Total		267	6	46	3	69	2	382	11
Atlético Madrid	2002–03	La Liga	26	0	4	0	–		30	0
Atlético Madrid	2003–04	La Liga	32	0	5	0	–		37	0
Atlético Madrid	2004–05	La Liga	27	0	1	0	3	0	31	0
Atlético Madrid	Total		85	0	10	0	3	0	98	0
Career total			352	6	56	3	72	2	480	11

=== International ===
Appearances and goals by national team and year
National team	Year	Apps	Goals
Spain	1994	11	1
Spain	1995	6	0
Spain	1996	9	0
Spain	1997	4	0
Spain	1998	9	0
Spain	1999	5	0
Spain	2000	7	0
Spain	2001	4	0
Spain	2002	1	0
Total		56	1

Scores and results list Spain's goal tally first, score column indicates score after each Barjuán goal.

List of international goals scored by Sergi Barjuán
No.	Date	Venue	Opponent	Score	Result	Competition
1	9 February 1994	Estadio Heliodoro Rodríguez López, Santa Cruz de Tenerife, Spain	Poland	1–0	1–1	Friendly

== Managerial statistics ==
As of 9 April 2022

Managerial record by team and tenure
Team	Nat	From	To	Record								Ref
Team	Nat	From	To	G	W	D	L	GF	GA	GD	Win %	Ref
Recreativo	(Spain)	22 May 2012	30 June 2014	89	34	22	33	104	118	−14	38.20	
Almería	(Spain)	6 April 2015	3 October 2015	17	5	2	10	24	35	−11	29.41	
Mallorca	(Spain)	4 April 2017	12 June 2017	10	3	5	2	12	11	+1	30.00	
Hangzhou Greentown	(China)	26 November 2017	3 July 2019	48	21	15	12	82	62	+20	43.75	
Barcelona B	(Spain)	17 June 2021	28 June 2022	36	14	9	13	54	49	+5	38.89	
Barcelona (interim)	(Spain)	28 October 2021	6 November 2021	3	1	2	0	5	4	+1	33.33	
Total				197	73	56	68	253	269	−16	37.06	—

== Honours ==
Barcelona

- La Liga: 1993–94, 1997–98, 1998–99
- Copa del Rey: 1996–97, 1997–98
- Supercopa de España: 1994, 1996
- UEFA Cup Winners' Cup: 1996–97
- UEFA Super Cup: 1997
- UEFA Champions League runner-up: 1993–94

Spain U21

- UEFA European Under-21 Championship third place: 1994
