= Albert Ferrer =

Spanish footballer (born 1970)

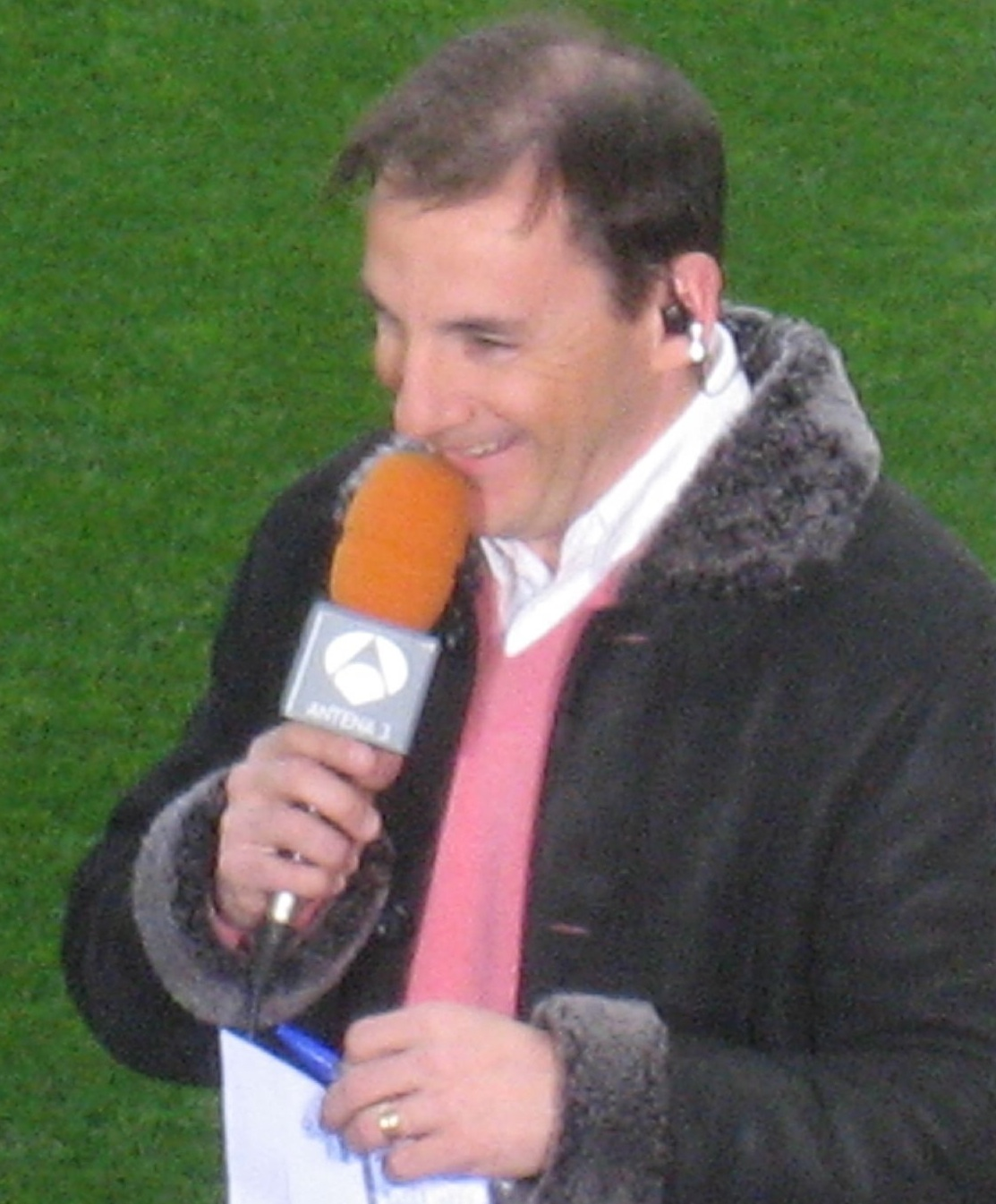
- Ferrer in 2008

Personal information
- Full name: Albert Ferrer Llopis
- Date of birth: 6 June 1970 (age 56)
- Place of birth: Barcelona, Spain
- Height: 1.70 m (5 ft 7 in)
- Position: Right-back

Youth career
- Maristas de Rubí
- 1983–1987: Barcelona

Senior career*
Years	Team	Apps	(Gls)
1987–1988	Barcelona C	32	(0)
1988–1990	Barcelona B	48	(2)
1990	→ Tenerife (loan)	17	(0)
1990–1998	Barcelona	204	(1)
1998–2003	Chelsea	76	(0)
Total		377	(3)

International career
1988	Spain U18	7	(1)
1988–1989	Spain U19	3	(0)
1989–1990	Spain U20	5	(0)
1990–1991	Spain U21	2	(0)
1991–1992	Spain U23	6	(0)
1991–1999	Spain	36	(0)

Managerial career
- 2010–2011: Vitesse
- 2014: Córdoba
- 2015: Mallorca
Medal record
Men's Football
Representing Spain
Olympic Games
Gold medal – first place	1992 Barcelona	Team competition
- * Club domestic league appearances and goals

Albert Ferrer Llopis (Catalan pronunciation: [əlˈβɛɾ(t) fəˈre]; born 6 June 1970) is a Spanish former professional footballer who played as a right-back.

Having represented Barcelona for almost a decade, he went on to appear for England's Chelsea until his retirement. During his spell in his home country he was nicknamed Chapi, and appeared in a total of 221 La Liga matches over nine seasons.

A Spain international on more than 30 occasions, Ferrer represented the nation in two World Cups and at the 1992 Olympic Games, winning the latter tournament. He started working as a manager in 2010, with Vitesse.

== Club career ==
=== Barcelona ===
Born in Barcelona, Catalonia, Ferrer was a pacy and tough-tackling defender. He began his senior career with Barcelona B, then served a loan with Tenerife in the 1989–90 season, with whom he made his La Liga debut at the age of 19.

Ferrer returned to the first team the following summer and became first choice right-back, remaining as such the following eight years and scoring once in the league. He often partnered another youth graduate, Sergi Barjuán, in the defensive wings.

Ferrer was a key member of the famous Dream Team and, during his time with the Blaugrana, won five leagues, a European Cup, a UEFA Cup Winners' Cup, two domestic cups, four Supercups and two UEFA Super Cups. As the Dutch dominance at the Camp Nou in terms of players was still an important one (the club was coached by Louis van Gaal), he left in June 1998 amongst other greats as Guillermo Amor.

=== Chelsea ===
In June 1998, Ferrer signed with Chelsea for £2.2 million. He quickly established himself in the side, helping them to qualify for their first ever Champions League in his debut campaign; his new club won the FA Cup the following year (but he missed the final through injury) and reached the quarter-finals of the Champions League; during the run in the latter, he played in 14 of 16 games, and scored his only goal in a 2–0 win over Hertha BSC.

A combination of injuries and manager Gianluca Vialli's squad rotation policy reduced Ferrer's opportunities in 2000–01, and he made only 14 league appearances. Chelsea reached another Cup final in 2002 – which he again missed, though this time through not being selected, despite playing in the semi-final against Fulham. Out of favour and facing strong competition from younger teammates, he played just seven times in his final two years, and left in May 2003 upon the expiry of his contract, totalling 113 overall matches for the Londoners and retiring shortly after at 33.

== International career ==
Ferrer earned 36 caps for Spain. His debut came on 4 September 1991 in a friendly win over Uruguay in Oviedo, as La Roja eventually did not qualify for UEFA Euro 1992.

Subsequently, Ferrer was a regular in the national side, starting at the 1994 FIFA World Cup and playing once in the 1998 edition, the 3–2 group stage loss against Nigeria, missing Euro 1996 and 2000 through injury (with Barcelona teammate Sergi on the other flank in all these tournaments).

In 1992, Ferrer was first-choice for the Olympic team that won the gold medal at the Summer Olympics, held in his hometown.

== Coaching career ==
After retiring, Ferrer worked as a color commentator for a number of Spanish broadcasters. In late October 2010, he was announced as new head coach of Vitesse in the Eredivisie; his staff also including his compatriot Albert Capellas (formerly a youth coach at Barcelona) and former Dutch goalkeeper Stanley Menzo, who left his post at Cambuur in order to join the Spaniards.

Ferrer led the side to 15th position, in a narrow escape from relegation. He was subsequently relieved of his duties, being replaced by John van den Brom.

On 17 February 2014, Ferrer was appointed at Segunda División club Córdoba. After finishing the season in the seventh place, they defeated Las Palmas in the play-off final to return to the top flight for the first time in 42 years.

Ferrer was fired on 20 October 2014, as Córdoba were last with only four points in eight matches. On 20 June of the following year, he was named Mallorca manager, signing a one-year deal; after three wins from 15 second-tier games, he was dismissed on 30 November.

On 29 August 2017, Ferrer returned to Barcelona as the coach of its legends team.

== Managerial statistics ==
As of 28 November 2015

Team	Nat	From	To	Record							
Team	Nat	From	To	G	W	D	L	GF	GA	GD	Win %
Vitesse	(Netherlands)	27 October 2010	30 June 2011	25	8	6	11	35	42	−7	32.00
Córdoba	(Spain)	17 February 2014	20 October 2014	28	8	13	7	26	27	−1	28.57
Mallorca	(Spain)	20 June 2015	30 November 2015	16	3	6	7	9	16	−7	18.75
Total				69	19	25	25	70	85	−15	27.54

== Honours ==
Barcelona

- La Liga: 1990–91, 1991–92, 1992–93, 1993–94, 1997–98
- Copa del Rey: 1996–97, 1997–98
- Supercopa de España: 1991, 1992, 1994, 1996
- European Cup: 1991–92
- UEFA Cup Winners' Cup: 1996–97
- UEFA Super Cup: 1992, 1997

Chelsea

- FA Cup: 1999–2000
- FA Community Shield: 2000
- UEFA Super Cup: 1998

Spain

- Summer Olympic Games: 1992
