= Guillermo Amor =

Spanish footballer (born 1967)

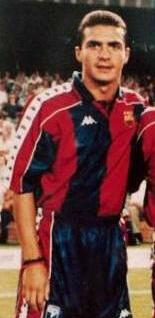
- Amor with Barcelona in 1994

Personal information
- Full name: Guillermo Amor Martínez
- Date of birth: 4 December 1967 (age 58)
- Place of birth: Benidorm, Spain
- Height: 1.74 m (5 ft 9 in)
- Position: Midfielder

Youth career
- 1979–1980: Benidorm
- 1980–1985: Barcelona

Senior career*
Years	Team	Apps	(Gls)
1984–1988	Barcelona B	49	(10)
1985–1986	Barcelona C	8	(0)
1988–1998	Barcelona	310	(47)
1998–2000	Fiorentina	24	(0)
2000–2002	Villarreal	64	(1)
2003	Livingston	3	(0)
Total		458	(58)

International career
1986	Spain U18	1	(0)
1989–1990	Spain U21	6	(0)
1990–1998	Spain	37	(4)

Managerial career
- 2015–2017: Adelaide United
- * Club domestic league appearances and goals

Guillermo Amor Martínez (Spanish pronunciation: [ɡiˈʎeɾmo aˈmoɾ maɾˈtineθ]; born 4 December 1967) is a Spanish former professional footballer who played as a versatile midfielder.

After spending most of his career with Barcelona, winning several accolades in a ten-year tenure, he ended it in Scotland with Livingston. Over 12 seasons, he amassed La Liga totals of 374 matches and 48 goals.

Amor won nearly 40 caps for Spain during the 1990s, representing the nation in one World Cup and one European Championship. After retiring, he worked as a manager in the A-League with Adelaide United, leading the club to a double in the first of his two seasons in charge.

== Playing career ==
=== Club ===
Born in Benidorm, Alicante, Valencian Community, Amor was a product of Barcelona's youth academy, and made his first-team debut in the 1988–89 season under Johan Cruyff, going on to become one of the Catalan team's most influential players as they achieved four consecutive La Liga titles and the 1991–92 European Cup (he did not play in the final against Sampdoria, however, after being booked in the last group stage match with Benfica). In 1993–94, as the club conquered the last of a successive four leagues, he appeared in all games except one, scoring a career-best eight goals. Additionally, on 5 April 1990, he opened the scoring in the Copa del Rey final against Real Madrid, helping to a 2–0 win at the Mestalla Stadium.

Amor left Barça at the end of the 1997–98 campaign, with another national championship won, deemed surplus to requirements by new manager Louis van Gaal as longtime teammate Albert Ferrer, having played 421 matches overall only behind club greats Xavi, Migueli and Carles Rexach. He subsequently had his first abroad experience, appearing sparingly for Serie A side Fiorentina over two years and then returning to Spain with Villarreal as the latter had just returned to the top division.

Amor retired from football after a short spell with Scotland's Livingston, for which he signed in January 2003, making his debut on the 28th in a 3–1 away victory over Partick Thistle. The Livi Lions eventually narrowly avoided relegation from the Premier League.

=== International ===
Amor represented Spain on 37 occasions, scoring four goals. His debut came in an UEFA Euro 1992 qualifier 2–3 loss in Czechoslovakia on 14 November 1990, and he went on to appear for the nation at both the Euro 1996 and the 1998 FIFA World Cup. In the former competition, on 18 June, he scored against Romania in a 2–1 win, netting in the 84th minute and helping the team to the quarter-finals in England.

Amor's last cap was a sour one, as Spain were downed by lowly Cyprus on 5 September 1998 in a Euro 2000 qualifier (3–2).

== Coaching career ==
After retiring, Amor served a four-year spell at former club Barcelona, being responsible for the youth categories after Joan Laporta was named president in 2003. He left after the board of directors decided not to renew his contract, but returned in July 2010 as technical director of football training.

In late August 2014, Amor was invited to Australia by one of his former colleagues and friend, former Barcelona youth academy coach and manager of Adelaide United, Josep Gombau. He spent a month observing and consulting the latter with Adelaide's training, after which he signed a one-year contract to become the technical director.

On 24 July 2015, following the resignation of Gombau due to family reasons, Amor was appointed as head coach prior to the start of the season. He only achieved his first win on the ninth matchday, in a 1–0 win against Perth Glory, but went on to lead the team to a club-record 13 clean sheets, including being unbeaten in the last ten home games and winning the last four away.

Amor led Adelaide to the double on 1 May 2016, after a 3–1 defeat of Western Sydney Wanderers in the Grand Final. On 10 May of the following year he left the Hindmarsh Stadium, returning to Barcelona as head of youth football alongside former teammate José Mari Bakero.

== Personal life ==
On 16 December 2007, Amor was involved in a serious traffic collision while travelling from Valencia. Released from hospital after only a week, he later fully recovered.

Amor's son, also called Guillermo (born 2001), played youth football in England with Leeds United.

== Career statistics ==
=== Club ===
Appearances and goals by club, season and competition
Club	Season	League			Cup (Note: Includes Copa del Rey, Coppa Italia, Scottish Cup.)		Continental		Total		Total	
Club	Season	Division	Apps	Goals	Apps	Goals	Apps	Goals	Apps	Goals	Apps	Goals
Barcelona B	1984–85	Segunda División	1	0	–		–		–		1	0
Barcelona B	1986–87	Segunda División	3	0	–		–		–		3	0
Barcelona B	1987–88	Segunda División	38	8	5	4	–		–		43	12
Barcelona B	1988–89	Segunda División	7	2	–		–		–		7	2
Barcelona B	Total		49	10	5	4	0	0	0	0	54	14
Barcelona C	1985–86	Segunda División B	8	0	–		–		–		8	0
Barcelona	1988–89	La Liga	27	8	6	3	5	2	–		38	13
Barcelona	1989–90	La Liga	33	6	6	1	2	0	1 (Note: Appearance in European Supercup)	1	42	8
Barcelona	1990–91	La Liga	34	4	1	1	8	2	2 (Note: Appearances in Supercopa de España)	0	45	7
Barcelona	1991–92	La Liga	36	6	2	0	3	1	2	1	43	8
Barcelona	1992–93	La Liga	33	5	5	0	4	1	5 (Note: One appearance in Intercontinental Cup, two appearances in European Supercup, two appearances in Supercopa de España)	0	47	6
Barcelona	1993–94	La Liga	37	8	2	1	12	2	2	0	53	11
Barcelona	1994–95	La Liga	34	4	1	0	6	1	2	1	43	6
Barcelona	1995–96	La Liga	28	6	6	2	6	1	–		40	9
Barcelona	1996–97	La Liga	26	0	3	0	6	0	2	0	37	0
Barcelona	1997–98	La Liga	22	0	4	0	4	0	3 (Note: One appearance in European Supercup, two appearances in Supercopa de España)	0	33	0
Barcelona	Total		310	47	36	8	56	10	19	3	421	68
Fiorentina	1998–99	Serie A	16	0	7	0	3	0	–		26	0
Fiorentina	1999–2000	Serie A	8	0	1	0	2	0	–		11	0
Fiorentina	Total		24	0	8	0	5	0	0	0	37	0
Villarreal	2000–01	La Liga	35	0	0	0	–		–		35	0
Villarreal	2001–02	La Liga	29	1	5	0	–		–		34	1
Villarreal	Total		64	1	5	0	0	0	0	0	69	1
Livingston	2002–03	Scottish Premier League	3	0	0	0	0	0	–		3	0
Career total			458	58	54	12	61	10	19	3	592	83

=== International ===
Scores and results list Spain's goal tally first, score column indicates score after each Amor goal.

List of international goals scored by Guillermo Amor
No.	Date	Venue	Opponent	Score	Result	Competition
1	19 December 1990	Sánchez Pizjuán, Seville, Spain	Albania	1–0	9–0	UEFA Euro 1992 qualifying
2	18 June 1996	Elland Road, Leeds, England	Romania	2–1	2–1	UEFA Euro 1996
3	13 November 1996	Heliodoro Rodríguez, Santa Cruz de Tenerife, Spain	Slovakia	2–1	4–1	1998 FIFA World Cup qualification
4	24 September 1997	Tehelné pole, Bratislava, Slovakia	Slovakia	2–1	2–1	1998 FIFA World Cup qualification

== Honours ==
=== Player ===
Barcelona

- La Liga: 1990–91, 1991–92, 1992–93, 1993–94, 1997–98
- Copa del Rey: 1989–90, 1996–97, 1997–98
- Supercopa de España: 1991, 1992, 1994, 1996
- European Cup: 1991–92
- UEFA Cup Winners' Cup: 1988–89, 1996–97
- UEFA Super Cup: 1992, 1997

=== Manager ===
Adelaide United

- A-League Premiership: 2015–16
- A-League Championship: 2016

Individual

- A-League Coach of the Year: 2015–16
- PFA Manager of the Year: 2015–16

== Managerial statistics ==
Team	From	To	Record				
Team	From	To	G	W	D	L	Win %
Adelaide United	24 July 2015	10 May 2017	67	24	17	26	35.82
Total			67	24	17	26	35.82
