= Gonzalo Sánchez Moreno =

Spanish footballer and coach

Personal information
- Full name: Gonzalo Sánchez Moreno
- Date of birth: 6 May 1972 (age 54)
- Place of birth: Barcelona, Spain
- Height: 5 ft 9 in (1.75 m)
- Position: Full-back

Youth career
- Barcelona

Senior career*
Years	Team	Apps	(Gls)
1990–1992	Barcelona C	37	(5)
1992–1995	Barcelona B	56	(2)
1995–1997	Almería	42	(1)
1997–1998	Barcelona B	5	(0)
Total		140	(8)

Managerial career
- 2015–2016: Bangladesh U23
- 2016: Bangladesh
- * Club domestic league appearances and goals

Gonzalo Sanchez Moreno is a former football player and was the head coach of the Bangladesh national football team.

== Career ==
Moreno was born in Barcelona in 1972. He played as a right-back for FC Barcelona for 17 years for all categories. He was part of the first team FC Barcelona under Johan Cruyff during the 1994 UEFA Champions League Final. From 1995 to 1996 he signed for UD Almería. He rejoined FC Barcelona in 1997. He retired a year later due to a knee injury.

== Coaching ==
In 2014, Moreno coached Madagascar's youth teams. He also won the 2014 Champion Clubs' Cup Indian Ocean with CNaPS Sports club from Madagascar. In 2016, he coached the Bangladesh national football team. Former Bangladeshi player and Bangladesh Football Federation president Kazi Salahuddin said he was impressed with his long career in FC Barcelona since the age of eight. He was taught by former Dutch legend Johan Cruyff and played with stars like Luís Figo and Pep Guardiola. Moreno also coached the Bangladesh's under-23 team. He achieved a bronze medal for Bangladesh at the 2016 South Asian Games.

He holds the UEFA A-license and is currently coaching for FC Barcelona Academy PRO, New York, US.

=== 2018 FIFA World Cup qualification ===
Moreno's Bangladeshi team lost against the Jordan under Harry Redknapp. However, the Bangladeshi team had ten players sanctioned, so he had to take a team full of substitutes.

== Managerial statistics ==
Team	Nat.	From	To	P	W	D	L	GS	GA	%W
Bangladesh U23	(Bangladesh)	28 December 2015	18 February 2016	4	2	1	1	6	11	50.00
Bangladesh	(Bangladesh)	19 February 2016	24 March 2016	2	0	0	2	1	14	0.00

P – Total of played matches W – Won matches D – Drawn matches L – Lost matches GS – Goal scored GA – Goals against
%W – Percentage of matches won

== Honours ==
- Football at the Indian Ocean Island Games

Champion 2014 with CNaPS Sports

- South Asian Games

Bronze medal (1): 2016
