= 1994 Supercopa de España =

Zaragoza	Barcelona
5	6
- on aggregate

First leg
Zaragoza	Barcelona
0	2
- Date: 27 August 1994
- Venue: La Romareda, Zaragoza
- Referee: Martín Navarrete

Second leg
Barcelona	Zaragoza
4	5
- Date: 30 August 1994
- Venue: Camp Nou, Barcelona
- Referee: Antonio López Nieto

The 1994 Supercopa de España was a two-legged Spanish football match played on 27 August and 30 August 1994. It was contested by Barcelona, who won the 1993–94 Spanish League, and Zaragoza, who were Spanish Cup winners in 1993–94. Barcelona won 6–5 on aggregate.

== Match details ==
=== First leg ===
27 August 1994
22:30 CET

Zaragoza	0–2	Barcelona
		Stoichkov 45'; Amor 64'

La Romareda, Zaragoza
Attendance: 15,000
Referee: Martín Navarrete

=== Second leg ===
30 August 1994
21:30 CET

Barcelona	4–5	Zaragoza
Txiki 13', 87'; Stoichkov 50', 69'		Belsué 10'; Esnáider 32'; Higuera 33', 77', 89'

Camp Nou, Barcelona
Attendance: 70,000
Referee: Antonio López Nieto

== See also ==
- 1994–95 La Liga
- 1994–95 Copa del Rey
- 1994–95 FC Barcelona season
- 1994–95 Real Zaragoza season
