= 1992 Supercopa de España =

Barcelona	Atlético Madrid
5	2
- on aggregate

First leg
Barcelona	Atlético Madrid
3	1
- Date: 28 October 1992
- Venue: Camp Nou, Barcelona
- Referee: Ansuátegui Roca

Second leg
Atlético Madrid	Barcelona
1	2
- Date: 11 November 1992
- Venue: Vicente Calderón, Madrid
- Referee: Marín López

The 1992 Supercopa de España was two-leg Spanish football matches played on 28 October and 11 November 1992. It contested by Atlético Madrid, who were Spanish Cup winners in 1991–92, and Barcelona, who won the 1991–92 Spanish League. Barcelona won 5–2 on aggregate.

== Match details ==
=== First leg ===
28 October 1992
21:00 CET

Barcelona	3–1	Atlético Madrid
Salinas 64'; Begiristain 73', 85'		Ferreira 16'

Camp Nou, Barcelona
Attendance: 32,000
Referee: Ansuátegui Roca

=== Second leg ===
11 November 1992
21:00 CET

Atlético Madrid	1–2	Barcelona
Manolo 30'		Begiristain 21'; Stoichkov 57'

Vicente Calderón, Madrid
Attendance: 15,000
Referee: Marín López

== See also ==
- 1992–93 La Liga
- 1992–93 Copa del Rey
- 1992–93 Atlético Madrid season
- 1992–93 FC Barcelona season
