= 1993–94 La Liga =

63rd season of La Liga

La Liga
- Season: 1993–94
- Dates: 4 September 1993 – 15 May 1994
- Champions: Barcelona; 14th title
- Relegated: Rayo Vallecano; Lleida; Osasuna
- Champions League: Barcelona
- UEFA Cup: Deportivo La Coruña; Real Madrid; Athletic Bilbao
- Cup Winners' Cup: Zaragoza
- Matches: 380
- Goals: 989 (2.6 per match)
- Top goalscorer: Romário (30 goals)

The 1993–94 La Liga season was the 63rd since its establishment. It began on 4 September 1993, and concluded on 15 May 1994. The league was won by Barcelona for the fourth consecutive season, and the fourteenth time overall.

== Team information ==
=== Clubs and locations ===
Location of teams in La Liga 1993–94
Canary Islands

Team	Stadium	Capacity
Barcelona	Camp Nou	98,772
Real Madrid	Santiago Bernabéu	80,354
Atlético Madrid	Vicente Calderón	55,005
Valencia	Mestalla	55,000
Sevilla	Ramón Sánchez Pizjuán	45,500
Athletic Bilbao	San Mamés	39,750
Deportivo de La Coruña	Riazor	34,600
Real Zaragoza	La Romareda	34,596
Celta de Vigo	Estadio Balaídos	32,500
Real Sociedad	Anoeta	32,200
Real Oviedo	Carlos Tartiere	30,500
Valladolid	José Zorrilla	27,846
Sporting de Gijón	El Molinón	25,885
Tenerife	Heliodoro Rodríguez López	22,824
Racing de Santander	El Sardinero	22,222
Osasuna	El Sadar	19,800
Albacete	Carlos Belmonte	18,000
Rayo Vallecano	Vallecas	14,708
Lleida	Camp d'Esports	13,500
Logroñés	Las Gaunas	9,552

== League table ==
Pos	Team	Pld	W	D	L	GF	GA	GD	Pts	Qualification or relegation
1	Barcelona (C)	38	25	6	7	91	42	+49	56 (Note: DEP 1–0 BAR; BAR 3–0 DEP)	Qualification for the Champions League group stage
2	Deportivo La Coruña	38	22	12	4	54	18	+36	56	Qualification for the UEFA Cup first round
3	Zaragoza	38	19	8	11	71	47	+24	46	Qualification for the Cup Winners' Cup first round (Note: Zaragoza entered UEFA Cup Winners' Cup as winners of 1993–94 Copa del Rey.)
4	Real Madrid	38	19	7	12	61	50	+11	45	Qualification for the UEFA Cup first round
5	Athletic Bilbao	38	16	11	11	61	47	+14	43	Qualification for the UEFA Cup first round
6	Sevilla	38	15	12	11	56	42	+14	42	
7	Valencia	38	14	12	12	55	50	+5	40	
8	Racing Santander	38	15	8	15	44	42	+2	38	
9	Oviedo	38	12	13	13	43	49	−6	37	
10	Tenerife	38	15	6	17	50	57	−7	36 (Note: TEN 2–1 RSO; RSO 2–1 TEN)	
11	Real Sociedad	38	12	12	14	39	47	−8	36	
12	Atlético Madrid	38	13	9	16	54	54	0	35 (Note: ATM: 5 pts; ALB: 4 pts; SPG: 3 pts)	
13	Albacete	38	10	15	13	49	58	−9	35	
14	Sporting Gijón	38	15	5	18	42	57	−15	35	
15	Celta Vigo	38	11	11	16	41	51	−10	33 (Note: CEL 2–0 LOG; LOG 1–1 CEL)	
16	Logroñés	38	9	15	14	47	58	−11	33	
17	Rayo Vallecano (R)	38	9	13	16	40	58	−18	31	Qualification for the relegation playoffs
18	Valladolid (O)	38	8	14	16	28	51	−23	30	Qualification for the relegation playoffs
19	Lleida (R)	38	7	13	18	29	48	−19	27	Relegation to the Segunda División
20	Osasuna (R)	38	8	10	20	34	63	−29	26	Relegation to the Segunda División

Source: LFP
Rules for classification: 1) points; 2) head-to-head points; 3) head-to-head goal difference; 4) head-to-head goals scored; 5) goal difference; 6) number of goals scored.
(C) Champions; (O) Play-off winners; (R) Relegated

== Results ==
Home \ Away	ALB	ATH	ATM	FCB	CEL	RCD	LLE	LOG	OSA	RAC	RVA	RMA	ROV	RSO	SFC	RSG	TEN	VCF	VLD	ZAR
Albacete		1–0	2–2	0–0	0–4	0–0	2–1	2–2	2–1	3–0	1–1	1–4	5–0	1–1	2–2	3–1	2–3	3–1	1–1	2–1
Athletic Bilbao	4–1		3–2	0–0	2–1	3–1	4–0	0–0	1–2	1–2	0–0	2–1	1–1	0–0	1–1	7–0	3–2	2–1	3–0	2–1
Atlético Madrid	0–0	4–2		4–3	3–2	0–1	0–0	1–0	3–0	4–0	2–0	0–0	0–3	1–2	2–4	2–0	2–0	2–0	2–0	0–4
Barcelona	2–1	2–3	5–3		1–0	3–0	0–1	2–2	8–1	2–1	1–0	5–0	1–0	3–0	5–2	4–0	2–1	3–1	3–0	4–1
Celta de Vigo	1–4	1–1	3–2	0–4		0–0	1–0	2–0	4–0	0–0	0–0	3–2	1–1	3–2	2–1	0–2	1–0	1–2	1–2	1–0
Deportivo La Coruña	5–1	4–1	2–1	1–0	0–0		2–0	3–0	3–1	1–0	0–0	4–0	4–0	0–1	2–0	2–1	2–0	0–0	0–0	1–1
Lleida	0–1	1–2	0–1	1–2	0–0	0–0		1–1	1–2	0–0	0–1	2–1	1–1	1–0	0–3	1–1	1–1	1–1	1–0	0–1
Logroñés	2–2	4–2	1–0	0–0	1–1	0–2	2–1		3–2	0–1	1–1	3–4	2–2	2–0	1–1	1–2	1–2	2–0	0–0	2–2
Osasuna	3–1	0–0	0–1	2–3	0–1	0–0	1–0	1–3		0–0	1–1	1–4	2–0	0–2	0–0	3–0	1–0	3–3	2–0	0–0
Racing Santander	1–1	2–2	2–0	1–1	2–1	0–1	2–1	0–0	3–1		1–0	1–3	1–2	4–1	1–0	2–0	1–0	0–1	5–1	2–0
Rayo Vallecano	0–0	1–2	2–1	2–4	1–1	0–0	1–2	3–1	1–0	1–1		0–2	0–0	4–1	2–1	2–1	4–3	1–1	0–1	1–2
Real Madrid	2–0	2–1	1–0	0–1	2–1	2–0	5–0	2–1	0–0	2–1	5–2		0–1	0–2	0–0	2–2	1–1	3–2	1–3	3–2
Oviedo	1–1	3–0	1–1	1–3	1–0	2–5	0–0	1–2	1–0	3–0	5–0	0–1		2–1	0–2	0–1	1–0	0–3	1–0	2–1
Real Sociedad	1–1	0–0	2–1	2–1	2–1	0–1	1–3	2–2	1–0	2–0	1–1	2–0	2–2		0–0	0–1	2–1	0–0	1–0	2–2
Sevilla	2–0	1–3	2–1	0–0	4–1	0–0	2–1	4–1	1–1	2–1	3–1	0–1	2–0	1–0		1–2	4–0	0–1	3–3	0–1
Sporting Gijón	1–0	0–1	1–1	2–0	2–1	0–2	1–1	1–2	7–1	0–2	2–0	2–1	0–0	3–2	0–1		1–2	2–0	2–0	0–3
Tenerife	2–1	2–1	1–1	2–3	0–0	0–1	1–0	2–0	1–0	1–0	3–1	0–0	2–2	2–1	2–1	3–0		1–0	0–2	5–3
Valencia	4–0	1–0	2–2	0–4	3–0	1–3	3–3	3–1	0–0	2–1	3–1	0–3	2–2	0–0	1–1	1–0	3–2		5–1	3–0
Valladolid	1–0	1–1	1–1	1–3	0–0	0–0	0–2	2–0	2–1	0–3	1–3	0–0	0–0	0–0	2–2	0–1	2–0	1–1		0–0
Zaragoza	1–1	1–0	2–1	6–3	4–1	0–1	1–1	1–1	2–1	2–0	4–1	4–1	2–1	3–0	1–2	3–0	6–2	1–0	2–0	

Updated to match(es) played on unknown. Source: LFP (in Spanish)
Legend: Blue = home team win; Yellow = draw; Red = away team win.

== Relegation playoff ==
Team 1	Agg.	Team 2	1st leg	2nd leg
Rayo Vallecano	1–1	SD Compostela	1–1	0–0
CD Toledo	1–4	Real Valladolid	1–0	0–4

- Tiebreak

Team 1	Score	Team 2
Rayo Vallecano	1–3	SD Compostela

=== First leg ===
22 May 1994	Rayo Vallecano	1–1	SD Compostela	Madrid
12:00	Urzaiz 44'	Report (in Spanish)	Ohen 31'	Stadium: Vallecas; Attendance: 14,000; Referee: Juan Ansuátegui Roca (Valencian Community)

22 May 1994	CD Toledo	1–0	Real Valladolid	Toledo
20:00	Paniagua 64'	Report (in Spanish)		Stadium: Salto del Caballo; Attendance: 5,000; Referee: José María García-Aranda (Community of Madrid)

=== Second leg ===
28 May 1994	SD Compostela	0–0 (1–1 agg.)	Rayo Vallecano	Santiago de Compostela
20:30		Report (in Spanish)		Stadium: San Lázaro; Attendance: 12,000; Referee: José Enrique Rubio Valdivieso (Castile and León)

29 May 1994	Real Valladolid	4–0 (4–1 agg.)	CD Toledo	Valladolid
19:00	Chuchi Macón 3'; Juli 45'; Amavisca 80', 85'	Report (in Spanish)		Stadium: José Zorrilla; Attendance: 26,000; Referee: Juan Manuel Brito Arceo (Canary Islands)

=== Tiebreak ===
1 June 1994	SD Compostela	3–1	Rayo Vallecano	Oviedo
21:00	Ohen 16', 53'; José 88'	Report (in Spanish)	Višnjić 56'	Stadium: Carlos Tartiere; Attendance: 13,000; Referee: Manuel Díaz Vega (Asturias)

== Top goalscorers ==
Rank	Player	Club	Goals
1	(Brazil) Romário	Barcelona	30
2	(Croatia) Davor Šuker	Sevilla	24
3	(Bosnia and Herzegovina) Meho Kodro	Real Sociedad	23
4	(Spain) Carlos	Oviedo	20
5	(Spain) Julen Guerrero	Athletic Bilbao	18
6	(Spain) José Ángel Ziganda	Athletic Bilbao	17
7	(Brazil) Bebeto	Deportivo La Coruña	16
7	(Federal Republic of Yugoslavia) Predrag Mijatović	Valencia	16
7	(Russia) Oleg Salenko	Logroñés	16
7	(Mexico) Hugo Sánchez	Rayo Vallecano	16
7	(Bulgaria) Hristo Stoichkov	Barcelona	16

== Attendances ==
#	Club	Avg. attendance	Highest
1	FC Barcelona	79,789	100,000
2	Real Madrid	75,737	100,000
3	Valencia CF	38,842	45,000
4	Athletic Club	35,447	45,000
5	Sevilla FC	30,421	45,000
6	Atlético de Madrid	28,105	42,000
7	Deportivo de La Coruña	22,895	30,000
8	Real Sociedad	19,932	30,000
9	Celta de Vigo	19,579	30,000
10	Real Racing Club	17,633	27,700
11	CD Tenerife	17,474	22,000
12	Real Sporting	17,418	30,000
13	Real Zaragoza	17,316	40,000
14	Real Oviedo	15,831	23,200
15	Real Valladolid	15,316	30,000
16	CA Osasuna	13,673	22,000
17	Albacete Balompié	11,974	20,000
18	UE Lleida	10,216	13,000
19	Rayo Vallecano	10,211	16,000
20	CD Logroñés	9,947	17,000
