= 1992–93 Sporting de Gijón season =

Real Sporting
1992–93 season
- Chairman: Eloy Calvo
- Manager: Mariano García Remón
- Stadium: El Molinón
- La Liga: 12th
- Copa del Rey: Fifth round
- Top goalscorer: Juanele (7)
- Average home league attendance: 16,202

The 1992–93 Sporting de Gijón season was the 31st season of the club in La Liga, the 17th consecutive after its last promotion.

== Overview ==
Bert Jacobs resigned after the round 29. Carlos García Cuervo replaced him until the end of the season.

== Squad ==
Note: Flags indicate national team as defined under FIFA eligibility rules; some limited exceptions apply. Players may hold more than one non-FIFA nationality.

| No. | Pos. | Nation | Player |
|---|---|---|---|
| — | GK | ESP | Ablanedo II |
| — | GK | ESP | Rodri |
| — | DF | ESP | Ángel Alcázar |
| — | DF | ESP | Arturo |
| — | DF | ESP | Guti |
| — | DF | ESP | Tati |
| — | DF | ESP | Pablo |
| — | DF | ESP | Raúl |
| — | DF | ESP | Abelardo |
| — | DF | ESP | Muñiz |
| — | DF | ESP | Ablanedo I |
| — | DF | ESP | Luis Sierra |
| — | MF | BUL | Georgi Yordanov |

| No. | Pos. | Nation | Player |
|---|---|---|---|
| — | MF | ESP | Iván Iglesias |
| — | MF | ESP | Emilio |
| — | MF | ESP | Ovidio |
| — | MF | ESP | Óscar |
| — | MF | ESP | Tomás |
| — | MF | ESP | Avelino |
| — | MF | SWE | Joakim Nilsson |
| — | FW | ESP | Javier Manjarín |
| — | FW | ESP | Juanele |
| — | FW | ESP | Dani Díaz |
| — | FW | ARG | Darío Scotto |
| — | FW | ESP | Thomas Christiansen |
| — | FW | ESP | José María Cela |

== Competitions ==
=== La Liga ===
==== Results by round ====
| Round | 1 | 2 | 3 | 4 | 5 | 6 | 7 | 8 | 9 | 10 | 11 | 12 | 13 | 14 | 15 | 16 | 17 | 18 | 19 | 20 | 21 | 22 | 23 | 24 | 25 | 26 | 27 | 28 | 29 | 30 | 31 | 32 | 33 | 34 | 35 | 36 | 37 | 38 |
|---|---|---|---|---|---|---|---|---|---|---|---|---|---|---|---|---|---|---|---|---|---|---|---|---|---|---|---|---|---|---|---|---|---|---|---|---|---|---|
| Ground | H | A | H | A | H | A | A | H | A | H | A | H | A | H | A | H | A | H | A | A | H | A | H | A | H | H | A | H | A | H | A | H | A | H | A | H | A | H |
| Result | D | W | D | W | D | L | D | W | L | W | W | L | D | D | W | L | D | L | L | L | L | D | L | L | D | W | L | L | L | D | D | W | W | W | L | W | D | L |
| Position | 11 | 6 | 5 | 3 | 3 | 7 | 9 | 7 | 8 | 6 | 6 | 8 | 8 | 8 | 7 | 9 | 9 | 9 | 12 | 13 | 13 | 14 | 14 | 15 | 15 | 15 | 15 | 16 | 16 | 16 | 15 | 15 | 15 | 12 | 15 | 12 | 13 | 12 |

Source: BDFutbol
A = Away; H = Home; W = Win; D = Draw; L = Loss

==== League table ====
| Pos | Team | Pld | W | D | L | GF | GA | GD | Pts |
|---|---|---|---|---|---|---|---|---|---|
| 10 | Osasuna | 38 | 12 | 10 | 16 | 42 | 41 | +1 | 34 (Note: OSA: 10 pts; CEL: 7 pts; SPG: 4 pts; RSO: 3 pts) |
| 11 | Celta Vigo | 38 | 9 | 16 | 13 | 25 | 32 | −7 | 34 |
| 12 | Sporting Gijón | 38 | 11 | 12 | 15 | 38 | 57 | −19 | 34 |
| 13 | Real Sociedad | 38 | 13 | 8 | 17 | 46 | 59 | −13 | 34 |
| 14 | Rayo Vallecano | 38 | 8 | 17 | 13 | 40 | 49 | −9 | 33 (Note: RVA 2–1 LOG; LOG 0–0 RVA) |

Source: LFP
Rules for classification: 1) points; 2) head-to-head points; 3) head-to-head goal difference; 4) head-to-head goals scored; 5) goal difference; 6) number of goals scored.

==== Matches ====
| 6 September 1992 1 | Real Sporting | 0–0 | Osasuna | Gijón |
| | | Summary | | Stadium: El Molinón; Referee: García de Loza |

| 12 September 1992 2 | Real Sociedad | 1–2 | Real Sporting | San Sebastián |
| | Oceano 61' (pen.) | Summary | Scotto 3'; Emilio 57' | Stadium: Atotxa; Referee: Marín López |

| 20 September 1992 3 | Real Sporting | 0–0 | Real Madrid | Gijón |
| | | Summary | | Stadium: El Molinón; Referee: Ansuategui Roca |

| 27 September 1992 4 | Tenerife | 0–2 | Real Sporting | Santa Cruz de Tenerife |
| | | Summary | Muñiz 51'; Iván Iglesias 67' | Stadium: Heliodoro Rodríguez López; Referee: López Nieto |

| 4 October 1992 5 | Real Sporting | 1–1 | Barcelona | Gijón |
| | Yordanov 78' | Report | Begiristain 1'; Stoichkov (yellow card) (yellow-red card) 89' | Stadium: El Molinón; Referee: Jiménez Moreno |

| 7 October 1992 6 | Real Burgos | 2–1 | Real Sporting | Burgos |
| | Limperger 72'; Balint 89' (pen.) | Summary | Cela (yellow card) (yellow-red card) 42'; Juanele 88' (pen.) | Stadium: El Plantío; Referee: Esquinas Torres |

| 18 October 1992 7 | Atlético Madrid | 1–1 | Real Sporting | Madrid |
| | Manolo (yellow card) (yellow-red card) 23'; Luis García 44' | Summary | Abelardo 84' | Stadium: Vicente Calderón; Referee: Fernández Marín |

| 25 October 1992 8 | Real Sporting | 1–0 | Albacete | Gijón |
| | Emilio 76' | Summary | | Stadium: El Molinón; Referee: Gómez Barril |

| 1 November 1992 9 | Deportivo La Coruña | 2–1 | Real Sporting | A Coruña |
| | Fran 6'; Bebeto 80' | Report | Scotto 87' | Stadium: Riazor; Referee: Carcelén García |

| 8 November 1992 10 | Real Sporting | 1–0 | Valencia | Gijón |
| | Manjarín 66' | Report | | Stadium: El Molinón; Referee: González Lecue |

| 22 November 1992 11 | Logroñés | 1–2 | Real Sporting | Logroño |
| | Abadía 50' (pen.) | Report | Cela 5', 17' | Stadium: Las Gaunas; Referee: García Aranda |

| 29 November 1992 12 | Real Sporting | 0–4 | Athletic Bilbao | Gijón |
| | | Summary | Valverde 12'; Garitano 33'; Ziganda 43'; Guerrero 63' | Stadium: El Molinón; Referee: Rivas Fernández |

| 5 December 1992 13 | Zaragoza | 1–1 | Real Sporting | Zaragoza |
| | Poyet 34' | Report | Manjarín 89' | Stadium: La Romareda; Referee: Rodríguez Martel |

| 13 December 1992 14 | Real Sporting | 1–1 | Español | Gijón |
| | Juanele 21' (pen.) | Report | Korneev 35' | Stadium: El Molinón; Referee: Martín Navarrete |

| 20 December 1992 15 | Cádiz | 2–3 | Real Sporting | Cádiz |
| | Barla 49'; Arteaga 75' | Summary | Manjarín 10'; Juanele 82'; Yordanov 89' | Stadium: Ramón de Carranza; Referee: Gómez López |

| 3 January 1993 16 | Real Sporting | 0–1 | Oviedo | Gijón |
| | | Summary | Lăcătuș 9' | Stadium: El Molinón; Referee: Gracia Redondo |

| 10 January 1993 17 | Rayo Vallecano | 2–2 | Real Sporting | Madrid |
| | Polster 17', 53' | Summary | Manjarín 19'; Juanele 65'; Iván Iglesias (yellow card) (yellow-red card) 85' | Stadium: Vallecas; Referee: Pajares Paz |

| 17 January 1993 18 | Real Sporting | 0–3 | Celta | Gijón |
| | Abelardo (red card) 49' | Report | Ratković 47'; Gudelj 49' (pen.); Otero 60' | Stadium: El Molinón; Referee: López Nieto |

| 24 January 1993 19 | Sevilla | 1–0 | Real Sporting | Seville |
| | Maradona 2' | Report | | Stadium: Ramón Sánchez Pizjuán; Referee: Calvo Córdova |

| 31 January 1993 20 | Osasuna | 3–0 | Real Sporting | Pamplona |
| | Aguilà 9'; Urban 26'; Martín González 76' | Summary | | Stadium: El Sadar; Referee: Brito Arceo |

| 7 February 1993 21 | Real Sporting | 2–4 | Real Sociedad | Gijón |
| | Juanele 36'; Abelardo 61' | Summary | Luis Pérez 29', 67'; Uría 37', 52' | Stadium: El Molinón; Referee: García de Loza |

| 14 February 1993 22 | Real Madrid | 0–0 | Real Sporting | Madrid |
| | | Summary | Yordanov (yellow card) (yellow-red card) 69' | Stadium: Santiago Bernabéu; Referee: González Lecue |

| 20 February 1993 23 | Sporting de Gijón | 1–2 | Tenerife | Gijón |
| | Yordanov 42'; Juanele (red card) 44' | Summary | Quique Estebaranz 45'; Felipe 67' | Stadium: El Molinón; Referee: Fernández Marín |

| 28 February 1993 24 | Barcelona | 7–2 | Real Sporting | Barcelona |
| | Laudrup 6', 41' (pen.); Begiristain 12'; Julio Salinas 70', 83'; Stoichkov 78', 89' (pen.); Nadal (red card) 89' | Summary | Scotto 71'; Emilio 89' (pen.) | Stadium: Camp Nou; Referee: Pérez Sánchez |

| 7 March 1993 25 | Real Sporting | 0–0 | Real Burgos | Gijón |
| | | Summary | | Stadium: El Molinón; Referee: Merino González |

| 14 March 1993 26 | Real Sporting | 2–1 | Atlético Madrid | Gijón |
| | Juanele 66'; Christiansen 86' | Summary | Lukić 84' | Stadium: El Molinón; Referee: Casajuana Rifà |

| 21 March 1993 27 | Albacete | 6–2 | Real Sporting | Albacete |
| | Dos Santos 10', 20', 63'; Menéndez 37'; Julio Soler 67'; Rommel 83' | Summary | Christiansen 1'; Manjarín 25' | Stadium: Carlos Belmonte; Referee: García Aranda |

| 4 April 1993 28 | Real Sporting | 0–1 | Deportivo La Coruña | Gijón |
| | | Summary | Albístegi 89' | Stadium: El Molinón; Referee: Sánchez Moreno |

| 11 April 1993 29 | Valencia | 2–0 | Real Sporting | Valencia |
| | Fernando 37'; Arroyo 66' | Summary | | Stadium: Luis Casanova; Referee: Rivas Fernández |

| 18 April 1993 30 | Real Sporting | 1–1 | Logroñés | Gijón |
| | Ablanedo I 84' | Summary | Salenko 46' | Stadium: El Molinón; Referee: Núñez Manrique |

| 2 May 1993 31 | Athletic Bilbao | 0–0 | Real Sporting | Bilbao |
| | | Summary | Abelardo (red card) 73' | Stadium: San Mamés; Referee: Carcelén García |

| 8 May 1993 32 | Real Sporting | 3–1 | Zaragoza | Gijón |
| | Manjarín 9'; Christiansen 61' (pen.), 74' | Summary | Solana (yellow card) (yellow-red card) 67'; Moisés 89' (pen.) | Stadium: El Molinón; Referee: Gómez López |

| 16 May 1993 33 | Español | 1–2 | Real Sporting | Barcelona |
| | Lluís 86' | Summary | Eloy Pérez 57' (o.g.); Iván Iglesias 76' | Stadium: Sarrià; Referee: Jiménez Moreno |

| 23 May 1993 34 | Real Sporting | 1–0 | Cádiz | Gijón |
| | Juanele 67' | Summary | | Stadium: El Molinón; Referee: Gómez Barril |

| 29 May 1993 35 | Oviedo | 2–1 | Real Sporting | Oviedo |
| | Carlos 47', 53' | Summary | Abelardo 16' | Stadium: Carlos Tartiere; Referee: García de Loza |

| 6 June 1993 36 | Real Sporting | 1–0 | Rayo Vallecano | Gijón |
| | Iván Iglesias 60' | Summary | | Stadium: El Molinón; Referee: Calvo Córdova |

| 13 June 1993 37 | Celta | 0–0 | Real Sporting | Vigo |
| | | Summary | Manjarín (yellow card) (yellow-red card) 74' | Stadium: Balaídos; Referee: Sánchez Moreno |

| 20 June 1993 38 | Real Sporting | 1–3 | Sevilla | Gijón |
| | Manjarín (yellow card) (yellow-red card) 39'; Iván Iglesias 81' (pen.) | Summary | Monchu 21'; Conte 62', 73' | Stadium: El Molinón; Referee: Rubio Valdivieso |

=== Copa del Rey ===
==== Matches ====
| 22 October 1992 Third round First leg | Alavés | 3–1 | Real Sporting | Vitoria-Gasteiz |
| | Iñigo 8'; Berastegui 36'; Núñez 49' (pen.) | Report | Iván Iglesias 69' | Stadium: Mendizorrotza; Referee: Bello Blanco |

| 12 November 1992 Third round Second leg | Real Sporting | 3–0 (4–3 agg.) | Alavés | Gijón |
| | Manjarín 29', 84'; Cela 89' | Report | | Stadium: El Molinón; Referee: Núñez Manrique |

| 9 December 1992 Fourth round First leg | Rayo Vallecano | 1–0 | Real Sporting | Madrid |
| | Pizo Gómez 2' | Report | | Stadium: Vallecas; Referee: Ramos Marcos |

| 6 January 1993 Fourth round Second leg | Real Sporting | 4–1 (a.e.t.) (4–2 agg.) | Rayo Vallecano | Gijón |
| | Emilio 10'; Juanele 54'; Scotto 110', 120' | Report | Višnjić 28' | Stadium: El Molinón; Referee: Urío Velázquez |

| 13 January 1993 Fifth round First leg | Real Sporting | 4–1 | Osasuna | Gijón |
| | Manjarín 18', 47'; Juanele 51'; Iván Iglesias 90+3' | Report | Urban 64' (pen.) | Stadium: El Molinón; Referee: Merino González |

| 20 January 1993 Fifth round Second leg | Osasuna | 2–0 (3–4 agg.) | Real Sporting | Pamplona |
| | Urban 7', 80' | Report | | Stadium: El Sadar; Referee: Sánchez Moreno |

| 3 February 1993 Round of 16; First leg | Real Sporting | 1–0 | Zaragoza | Gijón |
| | Scotto 13' | Report | | Stadium: El Molinón; Referee: Bello Blanco |

| 17 February 1993 Round of 16; Second leg | Zaragoza | 3–1 (3–2 agg.) | Real Sporting | Zaragoza |
| | Higuera 18'; Gay 23'; Brehme 42' (pen.) | Report | Luis Sierra 90' | Stadium: La Romareda; Referee: Riera Morro |

== Squad statistics ==
=== Appearances and goals ===
| No. | Pos | Nat | Player | Total | | La Liga | | Copa del Rey | |
| No. | Pos | Nat | Player | Apps | Goals | Apps | Goals | Apps | Goals |
|---|---|---|---|---|---|---|---|---|---|
| | GK | (Spain) ESP | Ablanedo II | 33 | 0 | 29+0 | 0 | 4+0 | 0 |
| | GK | (Spain) ESP | Rodri | 14 | 0 | 9+0 | 0 | 4+1 | 0 |
| | DF | (Spain) ESP | Ángel Alcázar | 39 | 0 | 26+6 | 0 | 7+0 | 0 |
| | DF | (Spain) ESP | Arturo | 32 | 0 | 23+2 | 0 | 6+1 | 0 |
| | DF | (Spain) ESP | Guti | 1 | 0 | 0+1 | 0 | 0+0 | 0 |
| | DF | (Spain) ESP | Tati | 3 | 0 | 3+0 | 0 | 0+0 | 0 |
| | DF | (Spain) ESP | Pablo | 39 | 0 | 30+3 | 0 | 5+1 | 0 |
| | DF | (Spain) ESP | Raúl | 10 | 0 | 5+2 | 0 | 2+1 | 0 |
| | DF | (Spain) ESP | Abelardo | 44 | 3 | 37+0 | 3 | 7+0 | 0 |
| | DF | (Spain) ESP | Muñiz | 39 | 1 | 32+0 | 1 | 7+0 | 0 |
| | DF | (Spain) ESP | Ablanedo I | 12 | 1 | 10+1 | 1 | 1+0 | 0 |
| | DF | (Spain) ESP | Luis Sierra | 18 | 1 | 16+0 | 0 | 1+1 | 1 |
| | MF | (Bulgaria) BUL | Georgi Yordanov | 30 | 3 | 21+2 | 3 | 5+2 | 0 |
| | MF | (Spain) ESP | Iván Iglesias | 42 | 6 | 34+1 | 4 | 7+0 | 2 |
| | MF | (Spain) ESP | Emilio | 39 | 4 | 31+0 | 3 | 8+0 | 1 |
| | MF | (Spain) ESP | Ovidio | 1 | 0 | 0+0 | 0 | 0+1 | 0 |
| | MF | (Spain) ESP | Óscar | 23 | 0 | 18+1 | 0 | 4+0 | 0 |
| | MF | (Spain) ESP | Tomás | 13 | 0 | 7+6 | 0 | 0+0 | 0 |
| | MF | (Spain) ESP | Avelino | 6 | 0 | 1+5 | 0 | 0+0 | 0 |
| | MF | (Sweden) SWE | Joakim Nilsson | 2 | 0 | 1+0 | 0 | 1+0 | 0 |
| | FW | (Spain) ESP | Javier Manjarín | 44 | 10 | 34+2 | 6 | 7+1 | 4 |
| | FW | (Spain) ESP | Juanele | 39 | 9 | 19+13 | 7 | 6+1 | 2 |
| | MF | (Spain) ESP | Dani Díaz | 1 | 0 | 0+1 | 0 | 0+0 | 0 |
| | FW | (Argentina) ARG | Darío Scotto | 24 | 6 | 9+10 | 3 | 4+1 | 3 |
| | FW | (Spain) ESP | Thomas Christiansen | 10 | 4 | 9+1 | 4 | 0+0 | 0 |
| | FW | (Spain) ESP | José María Cela | 30 | 3 | 14+12 | 2 | 2+2 | 1 |
