= 1991–92 Sporting de Gijón season =

Real Sporting
1991–92 season
- Chairman: Plácido Rodríguez
- Manager: Ciriaco Cano
- Stadium: El Molinón
- La Liga: 8th
- Copa del Rey: Semifinals
- UEFA Cup: Round of 32
- Top goalscorer: Monchu (11)
- Average home league attendance: 17,699

The 1991–92 Sporting de Gijón season was the 30th season of the club in La Liga, the 16th consecutive after its last promotion.

== Overview ==
Real Sporting was eliminated in the round of 32 of the UEFA Cup. Previously, it eliminated Partizan after a penalty shoot-out in Istanbul.

Joaquín Alonso retired from football at the end of the season, after spending all his career at the club and playing 479 matches at La Liga, establishing a new record.

This was the last season of the club before its conversion into a Sociedad Anónima Deportiva.

== Squad ==
Note: Flags indicate national team as defined under FIFA eligibility rules; some limited exceptions apply. Players may hold more than one non-FIFA nationality.

No.	Pos.	Nation	Player
—	GK	ESP	Emilio Isierte
—	GK	ESP	Rodri
—	GK	ESP	Ablanedo II
—	DF	ESP	Arturo
—	DF	ESP	Ángel Alcázar
—	DF	ESP	Tati
—	DF	ESP	Ablanedo I
—	DF	ESP	David Miner
—	DF	ESP	Abelardo
—	DF	ESP	Luis Sierra
—	DF	ESP	Juan Ramón López Muñiz
—	DF	ESP	Pablo
—	DF	ESP	José Díez Calleja
—	DF	ESP	Joaquín
—	MF	BUL	Georgi Yordanov

No.	Pos.	Nation	Player
—	MF	ESP	Óscar
—	MF	ESP	Alberto Bodelón
—	MF	SWE	Joakim Nilsson
—	MF	TCH	Milan Luhový
—	MF	ESP	Juanma
—	MF	ESP	Emilio
—	MF	ESP	Ovidio
—	MF	ESP	Iván Iglesias
—	MF	ESP	Tomás
—	MF	ESP	Juan Carlos
—	MF	ESP	Avelino
—	FW	ESP	Juanele
—	FW	ESP	Monchu
—	FW	ESP	Javier Manjarín

== Competitions ==
=== La Liga ===
==== Results by round ====
Round	1	2	3	4	5	6	7	8	9	10	11	12	13	14	15	16	17	18	19	20	21	22	23	24	25	26	27	28	29	30	31	32	33	34	35	36	37	38
Ground	A	H	A	H	H	A	H	A	H	A	H	A	H	A	H	A	H	A	H	H	A	H	A	A	H	A	H	A	H	A	H	A	H	A	H	A	H	A
Result	W	W	L	W	L	D	W	W	D	W	W	D	L	L	L	W	L	D	W	W	L	W	D	L	D	L	L	W	W	L	L	L	W	L	W	L	D	D
Position	8	3	6	4	7	6	4	4	4	3	3	3	4	6	8	7	9	8	8	7	7	7	6	7	7	9	10	8	7	8	9	10	8	9	9	9	8	8

Source: BDFutbol
A = Away; H = Home; W = Win; D = Draw; L = Loss

==== League table ====
Pos	Team	Pld	W	D	L	GF	GA	GD	Pts	Qualification or relegation
6	Zaragoza	38	17	7	14	40	41	−1	41	Qualification for the UEFA Cup first round
7	Albacete	38	16	8	14	45	47	−2	40	
8	Sporting Gijón	38	15	8	15	37	43	−6	38	
9	Real Burgos	38	12	13	13	40	43	−3	37	
10	Logroñés	38	13	10	15	36	51	−15	36	

Source: BDFútbol
Rules for classification: 1) Points; 2) Head-to-head results; 3) Goal difference; 4) Number of goals scored

==== Matches ====
1 September 1991 1	Valladolid	0–1	Real Sporting	Valladolid
		Summary	Luhový	Stadium: José Zorrilla; Referee: Casajuana Rifà

8 September 1991 2	Real Sporting	3–2	Athletic Bilbao	Gijón
	Monchu 38', 60'; Pablo 47'	Summary	Óscar Tabuenka 56', 78'	Stadium: El Molinón; Referee: Soriano Aladrén

15 September 1991 3	Sevilla	2–1	Real Sporting	Seville
	Diego 31'; Bengoechea 46'	Summary	Monchu 67'	Stadium: Ramón Sánchez Pizjuán; Referee: Panadero Martínez

28 September 1991 4	Real Sporting	2–1	Barcelona	Gijón
	Abelardo 15'; Monchu 68'	Summary	Nando (red card) 65'; Laudrup 78'	Stadium: El Molinón; Referee: Gómez Barril

6 October 1991 5	Real Sporting	1–4	Real Madrid	Gijón
	Luhový 67' (pen.)	Report	Butragueño 16', 24'; Míchel 70'; Hierro 83'	Stadium: El Molinón; Referee: González Lecue

20 October 1991 6	Logroñés	0–0	Real Sporting	Logroño
		Summary		Stadium: Las Gaunas; Referee: Brito Arceo

27 October 1991 7	Real Sporting	1–0	Deportivo La Coruña	Gijón
	Alcázar 84'	Summary		Stadium: El Molinón; Referee: Sánchez Calvo

3 November 1991 8	Albacete	0–2	Real Sporting	Albacete
	Zalazar (red card)	Summary	Joaquín 52', 60'	Stadium: Carlos Belmonte; Referee: Riera Morro

10 November 1991 9	Real Sporting	0–0	Real Burgos	Gijón
		Report		Stadium: El Molinón; Referee: Urío Velázquez

17 November 1991 10	Mallorca	0–1	Real Sporting	Palma
		Report	Avelino 89'	Stadium: Lluís Sitjar; Referee: García Prieto

24 November 1991 11	Real Sporting	3–0	Español	Gijón
	Juanele 47'; Monchu 72', 89'	Summary		Stadium: El Molinón; Referee: Paz García

1 December 1991 12	Real Sociedad	0–0	Real Sporting	San Sebastián
		Report		Stadium: Atotxa; Referee: Hernández Velázquez

8 December 1991 13	Real Sporting	1–2	Zaragoza	Gijón
	Yordanov 60' (pen.)	Report	Pardeza 68'; Gay 86'	Stadium: El Molinón; Referee: Caetano Bueno

15 December 1991 14	Oviedo	1–0	Real Sporting	Oviedo
	Bango 25' (pen.)	Report		Stadium: Carlos Tartiere; Referee: Pérez Sánchez

22 December 1991 15	Real Sporting	0–1	Atlético Madrid	Gijón
		Summary	Juanito 8'; Ferreira (red card) 89'	Stadium: El Molinón; Referee: Calvo Córdova

5 January 1992 16	Osasuna	0–2	Real Sporting	Pamplona
		Summary	Monchu 13'; Juanele 67' (pen.)	Stadium: El Sadar; Referee: Pino Casado

12 January 1992 17	Real Sporting	0–3	Valencia	Gijón
		Report	Tomás 24'; Penev 60', 62'	Stadium: El Molinón; Referee: Brito Arceo

19 January 1992 18	Tenerife	0–0	Real Sporting	Santa Cruz de Tenerife
		Summary	Luis Sierra (red card) 57'	Stadium: Heliodoro Rodríguez López; Referee: Ramos Marcos

26 January 1992 19	Real Sporting	2–1	Cádiz	Gijón
	Óscar 1'; Luhový 82'; Manjarín (red card) 82'	Summary	Kiko 56'	Stadium: El Molinón; Referee: Barrenechea Montero

2 February 1992 20	Real Sporting	1–0	Valladolid	Gijón
	Luhový 55'	Summary		Stadium: El Molinón; Referee: Soriano Aladrén

9 February 1992 21	Athletic Bilbao	2–0	Real Sporting	Bilbao
	Ayarza 15'; Urrutia 41'	Report		Stadium: San Mamés; Referee: Marín López

16 February 1992 22	Sporting de Gijón	2–1	Sevilla	Gijón
	Luhový 3'; Yordanov 53'	Summary	Salguero (red card); Marcos 78'	Stadium: El Molinón; Referee: Esquinas Torres

23 February 1992 23	Barcelona	1–1	Real Sporting	Barcelona
	Laudrup 12'	Summary	Juanele 13'	Stadium: Camp Nou; Referee: Rodríguez Martel

29 February 1992 23	Real Madrid	1–0	Real Sporting	Madrid
	Butragueño 43'	Summary		Stadium: Santiago Bernabéu; Referee: Jiménez Moreno

8 March 1992 25	Real Sporting	1–1	Logroñés	Gijón
	Monchu 78'	Summary	Cléber 86'	Stadium: El Molinón; Referee: Riera Morro

15 March 1992 26	Deportivo La Coruña	5–2	Real Sporting	A Coruña
	Claudio 4', 53'; Uralde 42', 78', 89'	Summary	Abelardo 25'; Muñiz (red card) 73'	Stadium: Riazor; Referee: Andradas Asurmendi

22 March 1992 27	Real Sporting	0–2	Albacete	Gijón
		Summary	Zalazar 24'; Antonio 83'	Stadium: El Molinón; Referee: Martínez de la Fuente

29 March 1992 28	Real Burgos	0–1	Real Sporting	Burgos
		Summary	Monchu 18'	Stadium: El Plantío; Referee: Martín Navarrete

5 April 1992 29	Real Sporting	2–0	Mallorca	Gijón
	Luhový 86', 89'	Summary		Stadium: El Molinón; Referee: Santamaría Uzqueda

12 April 1992 30	Español	2–0	Real Sporting	Barcelona
	Mokh (red card) 31'; Lluís 72'; Francisco 83'	Summary	Monchu (red card) 26'	Stadium: Sarrià; Referee: Alfonso Álvarez

19 April 1992 31	Real Sporting	0–1	Real Sociedad	Gijón
	Joaquín (red card) 41'	Summary	Alkiza 21'	Stadium: El Molinón; Referee: Yuste González

26 April 1992 32	Zaragoza	3–1	Real Sporting	Zaragoza
	Poyet 30'; Moisés 40'; Franco 78'	Summary	Yordanov 11'	Stadium: La Romareda; Referee: Enríquez Negreira

26 April 1992 33	Real Sporting	1–0	Oviedo	Gijón
	Monchu 3'; Óscar (red card) 71'	Summary		Stadium: El Molinón; Referee: Bello Blanco

10 May 1992 34	Atlético Madrid	2–1	Real Sporting	Madrid
	Sabas 58'; Manolo 65' (pen.); Donato 80'	Summary	Joaquín 20'; Tati (red card) 69'	Stadium: Vicente Calderón; Referee: Barrenechea Montero

17 May 1992 35	Real Sporting	1–0	Osasuna	Gijón
	Joaquín 34' (pen.); Alcázar (red card) 72'	Summary		Stadium: El Molinón; Referee: Sánchez Calvo

23 May 1992 36	Valencia	3–1	Real Sporting	Valencia
	Fernando 23'; Eloy 42', 86'	Summary	Joaquín 5' (pen.)	Stadium: Luis Casanova; Referee: Merino González

31 May 1992 37	Real Sporting	1–1	Tenerife	Gijón
	Emilio 15'	Summary	Quique Estebaranz 1'; Toni (red card) 77'	Stadium: El Molinón; Referee: Miró Pastor

7 June 1992 38	Cádiz	1–1	Real Sporting	Cádiz
	Tilico 42'	Summary	Monchu 57'	Stadium: Ramón de Carranza; Referee: Soriano Aladrén

=== UEFA Cup ===
18 September 1991 Round of 64; First leg	Real Sporting	2–0	(Socialist Federal Republic of Yugoslavia) Partizan	Gijón
20:45	Monchu 64'; Luhový 79'	Report		Stadium: El Molinón; Referee: John Blankenstein (NED)

2 October 1991 Round of 64; Second leg	Partizan (Socialist Federal Republic of Yugoslavia)	2–0 (a.e.t.) (2–2 agg.) (2–3 p)	Real Sporting	Istanbul (Note: Partizan played their home match at Istanbul, Turkey due to the ban to play games in the SFR Yugoslavia.)
18:00	Mijatović 85'; Zahovič 88'	Report		Stadium: BJK İnönü Stadium; Attendance: 1,189; Referee: Tullio Lanese (ITA)
	Penalties
	Mijatović (penalty missed); Krčmarević (penalty scored); Zahovič (penalty scored); Gudelj (penalty missed); Novak (penalty missed)		Avelino (penalty scored); Joaquín (penalty scored); Arturo (penalty scored); Luhový (penalty missed)

24 October 1991 Round of 32; First leg	Real Sporting	2–2	(Romania) Steaua București	Gijón
20:30	Luhový 45'; Abelardo 90'	Report	Popa 27'; Dumitrescu 59'	Stadium: El Molinón; Referee: Günther Habermann (GER)

6 November 1991 Round of 32; Second leg	Steaua București (Romania)	1–0 (3–2 agg.)	Real Sporting	Bucharest
19:00	Popa 60'	Report		Stadium: Stadionul Steaua; Referee: Joël Quiniou (FRA)

=== Copa del Rey ===
==== Matches ====
8 January 1992 Round of 16; First leg	Benidorm	1–1	Real Sporting	Benidorm
21:00 CET	Arturo 47' (o.g.)	Report	Óscar 87'	Stadium: Foietes; Referee: Casajuana Rifà

22 January 1992 Round of 16; Second leg	Real Sporting	2–0 (a.e.t.) (3–1 agg.)	Benidorm	Gijón
20:45 CET	Luhový 97' (pen.); Juanma 100'	Report		Stadium: El Molinón; Attendance: 10,000; Referee: Antoñana Moraza

5 February 1992 Quarterfinals; First leg	Real Sporting	2–0	Logroñés	Gijón
	Juanele 17' (pen.), 22'	Report		Stadium: El Molinón; Attendance: 10,000; Referee: Juan Andújar Oliver

26 February 1992 Quarterfinals; Second leg	Logroñés	1–0 (1–2 agg.)	Real Sporting	Logroño
20:45 CET	Uribarrena 6'	Report		Stadium: Las Gaunas; Attendance: 9,000; Referee: Calvo Córdova

13 June 1992 Semifinals; First leg	Real Sporting	1–2	Real Madrid	Gijón
20:00 CET	Yordanov 11'	Report	Butragueño 22'; Míchel 27'	Stadium: El Molinón; Attendance: 17,000; Referee: Andújar Oliver

20 June 1992 Semifinals; Second leg	Real Madrid	5–2 (7–3 agg.)	Real Sporting	Madrid
21:00 CET	Míchel 23'; Hierro 36', 90'; Hagi 50'; Sanchís 52'	Report (in Spanish)	Monchu 60'; Juanele 67'	Stadium: Santiago Bernabéu; Attendance: 15,000; Referee: Marín López

== Squad statistics ==
=== Appearances and goals ===
No.	Pos	Nat	Player	Total		La Liga		Copa del Rey		UEFA Cup	
No.	Pos	Nat	Player	Apps	Goals	Apps	Goals	Apps	Goals	Apps	Goals
	GK	(Spain) ESP	Emilio Isierte	45	0	38+0	0	3+0	0	4+0	0
	GK	(Spain) ESP	Rodri	0	0	0+0	0	0+0	0	0+0	0
	GK	(Spain) ESP	Ablanedo II	4	0	0+0	0	4+0	0	0+0	0
	DF	(Spain) ESP	Arturo	46	0	33+2	0	7+0	0	4+0	0
	DF	(Spain) ESP	Ángel Alcázar	42	1	33+1	1	4+0	0	4+0	0
	DF	(Spain) ESP	Tati	33	0	22+3	0	6+0	0	2+0	0
	DF	(Spain) ESP	Ablanedo I	0	0	0+0	0	0+0	0	0+0	0
	DF	(Spain) ESP	David Miner	2	0	1+0	0	1+0	0	0+0	0
	DF	(Spain) ESP	Abelardo	41	2	35+0	2	2+0	0	4+0	0
	DF	(Spain) ESP	Luis Sierra	33	0	25+1	0	3+1	0	3+0	0
	DF	(Spain) ESP	Juan Ramón López Muñiz	29	0	22+0	0	7+0	0	0+0	0
	DF	(Spain) ESP	Pablo	13	1	7+1	1	1+1	0	3+0	0
	DF	(Spain) ESP	José Díez Calleja	0	0	0+0	0	0+0	0	0+0	0
	MF	(Spain) ESP	Joaquín	31	5	26+0	5	3+0	0	2+0	0
	MF	(Bulgaria) BUL	Georgi Yordanov	35	4	24+4	3	5+0	1	1+1	0
	MF	(Spain) ESP	Óscar	35	2	22+4	1	5+0	1	3+1	0
	MF	(Spain) ESP	Alberto Bodelón	2	0	0+0	0	0+2	0	0+0	0
	MF	(Sweden) SWE	Joakim Nilsson	32	0	18+7	0	4+0	0	1+2	0
	MF	(Czechoslovakia) TCH	Milan Luhový	27	11	17+3	7	4+0	2	3+0	2
	MF	(Spain) ESP	Juanma	20	2	8+6	0	3+1	2	2+0	0
	MF	(Spain) ESP	Emilio	14	1	5+6	1	2+0	0	1+0	0
	MF	(Spain) ESP	Ovidio	11	0	4+6	0	1+0	0	0+0	0
	MF	(Spain) ESP	Iván Iglesias	12	0	0+8	0	0+3	0	1+0	0
	MF	(Spain) ESP	Tomás	2	0	2+0	0	0+0	0	0+0	0
	MF	(Spain) ESP	Juan Carlos	0	0	0+0	0	0+0	0	0+0	0
	MF	(Spain) ESP	Avelino	29	1	15+10	1	1+0	0	1+2	0
	FW	(Spain) ESP	Juanele	33	6	20+4	3	5+2	3	1+1	0
	FW	(Spain) ESP	Monchu	40	13	24+7	11	3+2	1	4+0	1
	FW	(Spain) ESP	Javier Manjarín	24	1	17+2	1	3+2	0	0+0	0
