= 1993–94 Sporting de Gijón season =

Real Sporting
1993–94 season
- Chairman: Eloy Calvo
- Manager: Mariano García Remón
- Stadium: El Molinón
- La Liga: 14th
- Copa del Rey: Round of 16
- Top goalscorer: Xavier Esciach (11); Juanele (11)
- Average home league attendance: 17,171

The 1993–94 Sporting de Gijón season was the 32nd season of the club in La Liga, the 18th consecutive after its last promotion.

== Overview ==
On 16 January 1994, in a rainy evening, Real Sporting defeated Osasuna by 7–1, becoming its largest win in La Liga ever. Xavier Escaich scored four goals.

== Squad ==
Note: Flags indicate national team as defined under FIFA eligibility rules; some limited exceptions apply. Players may hold more than one non-FIFA nationality.

No.	Pos.	Nation	Player
—	GK	ESP	Emilio Isierte
—	GK	ESP	Ramón
—	GK	ESP	Ablanedo II
—	GK	ESP	Rodri
—	DF	ESP	Arturo
—	DF	ESP	Tino
—	DF	ESP	Raúl
—	DF	ESP	Pablo
—	DF	ESP	Ablanedo I
—	DF	ESP	Luis Sierra
—	DF	ESP	Marcelino
—	DF	ESP	Juan Ramón López Muñiz
—	DF	ESP	Abelardo
—	MF	CRO	Daniel Šarić

No.	Pos.	Nation	Player
—	MF	ROU	Marcel Sabou
—	MF	ESP	Óscar
—	MF	ESP	José Manuel
—	MF	ESP	Mario
—	MF	ESP	Francisco Javier Castaño
—	MF	ESP	Tomás
—	MF	ESP	Avelino
—	MF	ESP	Emilio
—	MF	ESP	Miner
—	FW	ESP	Dani Díaz
—	FW	ESP	Juanele
—	FW	CRO	Mario Stanić
—	FW	ESP	José María Cela
—	FW	ESP	Xavier Escaich

== Competitions ==
=== La Liga ===
==== Results by round ====
Round	1	2	3	4	5	6	7	8	9	10	11	12	13	14	15	16	17	18	19	20	21	22	23	24	25	26	27	28	29	30	31	32	33	34	35	36	37	38
Ground	A	H	A	H	A	H	A	H	A	H	A	H	H	A	H	A	H	A	H	H	A	H	A	H	A	H	A	H	A	H	A	A	H	A	H	A	H	A
Result	W	L	W	D	L	L	D	W	W	W	W	L	W	W	W	L	W	L	W	W	L	D	L	L	L	D	L	L	L	W	L	D	L	W	W	L	L	L
Position	8	13	10	9	12	15	16	11	10	7	7	7	7	4	3	4	3	4	3	3	3	3	5	5	7	7	10	10	12	9	11	11	12	12	9	10	11	14

Source: BDFutbol
A = Away; H = Home; W = Win; D = Draw; L = Loss

==== League table ====
Pos	Team	Pld	W	D	L	GF	GA	GD	Pts
12	Atlético Madrid	38	13	9	16	54	54	0	35 (Note: ATM: 5 pts; ALB: 4 pts; SPG: 3 pts)
13	Albacete	38	10	15	13	49	58	−9	35
14	Sporting Gijón	38	15	5	18	42	57	−15	35
15	Celta Vigo	38	11	11	16	41	51	−10	33 (Note: CEL 2–0 LOG; LOG 1–1 CEL)
16	Logroñés	38	9	15	14	47	58	−11	33

Source: LFP
Rules for classification: 1) points; 2) head-to-head points; 3) head-to-head goal difference; 4) head-to-head goals scored; 5) goal difference; 6) number of goals scored.

==== Matches ====
5 September 1993 1	Valladolid	0–1	Real Sporting	Valladolid
		Summary	Juanele 68'	Stadium: José Zorrilla; Referee: Urío Velázquez

11 September 1993 2	Real Sporting	0–2	Deportivo La Coruña	Gijón
		Summary	Nando 79'; Manjarín 82'	Stadium: El Molinón; Referee: García Aranda

19 September 1993 3	Oviedo	0–1	Real Sporting	Oviedo
		Summary	Juanele 78'	Stadium: Carlos Tartiere; Referee: Martín Navarrete

25 September 1993 4	Real Sporting	1–1	Atlético Madrid	Gijón
	Abelardo 27'	Summary	Manolo 45'; Luis García (red card) 65'	Stadium: El Molinón; Referee: Pérez Sánchez

3 October 1993 5	Racing Santander	2–0	Real Sporting	Santander
	Mutiu 34'; Merino 81'	Summary		Stadium: El Sardinero; Referee: García Aranda

6 October 1993 6	Real Sporting	1–2	Tenerife	Gijón
	Juanele 1'	Report	Pier 18'; Chano 50'	Stadium: El Molinón; Referee: Santamaría Uzqueda

17 October 1993 7	Lleida	1–1	Real Sporting	Lleida
	Virgilio 59'	Summary	Tomás 55'	Stadium: Camp d'Esports; Referee: Esquinas Torres

24 October 1993 8	Real Sporting	2–0	Rayo Vallecano	Gijón
	Muñiz 32' (pen.); Stanić 88'	Summary		Stadium: El Molinón; Referee: Gómez López

31 October 1993 9	Logroñés	1–2	Real Sporting	Logroño
	Salenko 22'; Poyatos (red card) 79'	Report	Escaich 41', 54'	Stadium: Las Gaunas; Referee: Ansuategui Roca

7 November 1993 10	Real Sporting	2–0	Valencia	Gijón
	Escaich 38'; Juanele 89'	Report	Eloy (yellow card) (yellow-red card) 89'	Stadium: El Molinón; Referee: Brito Arceo

10 November 1993 11	Celta	0–2	Real Sporting	Vigo
		Report	Muñiz 44' (pen.); Stanić 89'	Stadium: Balaídos; Referee: Pajares Paz

21 November 1993 12	Real Sporting	0–1	Athletic Bilbao	Gijón
		Summary	Ziganda 29'	Stadium: El Molinón; Referee: Gracia Redondo

28 November 1993 13	Real Sporting	2–1	Real Madrid	Gijón
	Óscar 62'; Juanele 83' (pen.)	Report	Prosinečki 56'	Stadium: El Molinón; Referee: Andújar Oliver

5 December 1993 14	Sevilla	1–2	Real Sporting	Seville
	Ferreira (yellow card) (yellow-red card) 44'; Abelardo 74' (o.g.)	Report	Óscar 14'; Miner 57'	Stadium: Ramón Sánchez Pizjuán; Referee: García Aranda

12 December 1993 15	Real Sporting	3–2	Real Sociedad	Gijón
	Stanić 44'; Juanele 62'; Óscar 64'	Summary	Kodro 26', 81' (pen.)	Stadium: El Molinón; Referee: García de Loza

19 December 1993 16	Albacete	3–1	Real Sporting	Albacete
	Zalazar 20' (pen.); Nílson 66'; Menéndez 88'	Summary	Juanele 5'	Stadium: Carlos Belmonte; Referee: Gómez López

2 January 1994 17	Real Sporting	2–0	Barcelona	Gijón
	Abelardo 34'; Miner 75'	Report		Stadium: El Molinón; Referee: López Nieto

9 January 1994 18	Zaragoza	3–0	Real Sporting	Zaragoza
	Aragón 34' (pen.); Belsué 61'; Gay 66'	Summary	Juanele (red card) 33'; Luis Sierra (yellow card) (yellow-red card) 33'	Stadium: La Romareda; Referee: Esquinas Torres

16 January 1994 19	Real Sporting	7–1	Osasuna	Gijón
	Escaich 6', 44', 58', 75'; Abelardo 11'; Stanić 37', 39'	Report	Ziober 47'; Martín González (red card) 67'	Stadium: El Molinón; Referee: Núñez Manrique

23 January 1994 20	Real Sporting	2–0	Valladolid	Gijón
	Stanić 34'; Šarić 89'	Summary	Iván Rocha (red card) 74'	Stadium: El Molinón; Referee: Ansuategui Roca

30 January 1994 21	Deportivo La Coruña	2–1	Real Sporting	A Coruña
	Donato 42' (pen.); Bebeto 87'	Summary	Juanele 89' (pen.)	Stadium: Riazor; Referee: Rubio Valdivieso

6 February 1994 22	Sporting de Gijón	0–0	Oviedo	Gijón
		Summary		Stadium: El Molinón; Referee: Fernández Marín

5 March 1994 23	Atlético Madrid	2–0	Real Sporting	Madrid
	Kiko 5'; Luis García 60' (pen.)	Summary		Stadium: Vicente Calderón; Referee: Urío Velázquez

20 February 1994 24	Real Sporting	0–2	Racing Santander	Gijón
	Óscar (yellow card) (yellow-red card) 82'	Summary	Radchenko 22'; Popov 89'	Stadium: El Molinón; Referee: Rivas Fernández

23 February 1994 25	Tenerife	3–0	Real Sporting	Santa Cruz de Tenerife
	Pablo 6' (o.g.); Latorre 20'; Dertycia 89' (pen.)	Summary		Stadium: Heliodoro Rodríguez López; Referee: Esquinas Torres

27 February 1994 26	Real Sporting	1–1	Lleida	Gijón
	Abelardo 60'	Summary	Parés 25'	Stadium: El Molinón; Referee: Santamaría Uzqueda

6 March 1994 27	Rayo Vallecano	2–1	Real Sporting	Madrid
	Calderón 55'; Hugo Sánchez 88'	Summary	Sabou 34'	Stadium: Vallecas; Referee: Gracia Redondo

13 March 1994 28	Real Sporting	1–2	Logroñés	Gijón
	Escaich 49'	Summary	Abelardo 54' (o.g.); Salenko 81'	Stadium: El Molinón; Referee: Brito Arceo

20 March 1994 29	Valencia	1–0	Real Sporting	Valencia
	Mijatović 87'	Summary		Stadium: Luis Casanova; Referee: García de Loza

27 March 1994 30	Real Sporting	2–1	Celta	Gijón
	Luis Sierra 55'; Castaño 73'	Summary	Gudelj 48'	Stadium: El Molinón; Referee: Núñez Manrique

3 April 1994 31	Athletic Bilbao	7–0	Real Sporting	Bilbao
	Guerrero 1', 47', 80', 89' (pen.); Larrazábal 4'; Ziganda 36', 41'	Summary	Luis Sierra (red card) 3'; Castaño (red card) 89'	Stadium: San Mamés; Referee: Merino González

14 May 1994 32	Real Madrid	2–2	Real Sporting	Madrid
	Prosinečki 7'; Míchel 63' (pen.); Hierro (red card) 81'	Summary	Šarić 25'; Abelardo 76'	Stadium: Santiago Bernabéu; Referee: Pajares Paz

9 April 1994 33	Real Sporting	0–1	Sevilla	Gijón
		Summary	Prieto 39'	Stadium: El Molinón; Referee: Gracia Redondo

17 April 1994 34	Real Sociedad	0–1	Real Sporting	San Sebastián
		Summary	Muñiz 41'	Stadium: Anoeta; Referee: Núñez Manrique

24 April 1994 35	Real Sporting	1–0	Albacete	Gijón
	Stanić 41'	Summary		Stadium: El Molinón; Referee: Gómez López

1 May 1994 36	Barcelona	4–0	Real Sporting	Barcelona
	Amor 42'; Romário 79', 89'; Stoichkov 87'	Summary		Stadium: Camp Nou; Referee: Ansuategui Roca

8 May 1994 37	Real Sporting	0–3	Zaragoza	Gijón
	Luis Sierra (red card) 53'	Summary	Aragón 53' (pen.); Belsué 65'; Franco 88'	Stadium: El Molinón; Referee: Santamaría Uzqueda

15 May 1994 38	Osasuna	3–0	Real Sporting	Pamplona
	Ziober 47'; Sànchez Jara 49'; Larrainzar 54'	Summary		Stadium: El Sadar; Referee: Gómez López

=== Copa del Rey ===
==== Matches ====
8 September 1993 Third round First leg	Cultural Leonesa	3–2	Real Sporting	León
	Narciso 16'; Juan Manuel 36', 57'	Report	Ablanedo I 32'; Stanić 63'	Stadium: Antonio Amilivia; Referee: García de Loza

14 September 1993 Third round Second leg	Real Sporting	5–1 (7–4 agg.)	Cultural Leonesa	Gijón
	Juanele 12', 78'; Abelardo 33'; Muñiz 49' (pen.); Stanić 64'	Report	Villafañe 2'	Stadium: El Molinón; Referee: Bello Blanco

8 December 1993 Fifth round First leg	Real Sporting	3–1	Valladolid	Gijón
	Juanele 65' (pen.); Stanić 73'; Abelardo 89'	Report	Amavisca 1'; Cuaresma (yellow card) (yellow-red card) 64'	Stadium: El Molinón; Referee: Martín Navarrete

22 December 1993 Fifth round Second leg	Valladolid	1–0 (2–3 agg.)	Real Sporting	Valladolid
	Alberto 54'	Report		Stadium: José Zorrilla; Referee: Pérez Sánchez

4 January 1994 Round of 16; First leg	Real Sporting	0–3	Barcelona	Gijón
		Report	Amor 2'; Sergi 8'; Julio Salinas 28'	Stadium: El Molinón; Referee: Brito Arceo

12 January 1995 Round of 16; Second leg	Barcelona	1–1 (4–1 agg.)	Real Sporting	Barcelona
	Julio Salinas 24'	Report	Ablanedo I 11'	Stadium: Camp Nou; Referee: Merino González

== Squad statistics ==
=== Appearances and goals ===
No.	Pos	Nat	Player	Total		La Liga		Copa del Rey	
No.	Pos	Nat	Player	Apps	Goals	Apps	Goals	Apps	Goals
	GK	(Spain) ESP	Emilio Isierte	25	0	19+1	0	5+0	0
	GK	(Spain) ESP	Ablanedo II	2	0	1+0	0	1+0	0
	GK	(Spain) ESP	Ramón	18	0	18+0	0	0+0	0
	GK	(Spain) ESP	Rodri	0	0	0+0	0	0+0	0
	DF	(Spain) ESP	Arturo	24	0	12+7	0	2+3	0
	DF	(Spain) ESP	Tino	0	0	0+0	0	0+0	0
	DF	(Spain) ESP	Raúl	4	0	2+1	0	1+0	0
	DF	(Spain) ESP	Pablo	44	0	38+0	0	6+0	0
	DF	(Spain) ESP	Ablanedo I	17	2	7+6	0	2+2	2
	DF	(Spain) ESP	Marcelino Elena	4	0	1+1	0	1+1	0
	DF	(Spain) ESP	Juan Ramón López Muñiz	40	4	35+0	3	5+0	1
	DF	(Spain) ESP	Luis Sierra	37	1	32+0	1	4+1	0
	DF	(Spain) ESP	Abelardo	41	7	36+0	5	5+0	2
	MF	(Croatia) CRO	Daniel Šarić	23	2	15+7	2	1+0	0
	MF	(Romania) ROU	Marcel Sabou	35	1	29+2	1	3+1	0
	MF	(Spain) ESP	Óscar	30	3	26+0	3	4+0	0
	MF	(Spain) ESP	José Manuel	1	0	0+1	0	0+0	0
	MF	(Spain) ESP	Mario	3	0	0+1	0	1+1	0
	MF	(Spain) ESP	Francisco Javier Castaño	35	1	17+12	1	6+0	0
	MF	(Spain) ESP	Tomás	22	1	16+4	1	1+1	0
	MF	(Spain) ESP	Avelino	3	0	2+0	0	1+0	0
	MF	(Spain) ESP	Emilio	9	0	6+1	0	2+0	0
	MF	(Spain) ESP	Miner	41	2	33+5	2	3+0	0
	MF	(Spain) ESP	Dani Díaz	4	0	2+1	0	1+0	0
	FW	(Spain) ESP	Juanele	38	11	30+5	8	2+1	3
	FW	(Croatia) CRO	Mario Stanić	38	10	24+10	7	4+0	3
	FW	(Spain) ESP	José María Cela	6	0	2+2	0	2+0	0
	FW	(Spain) ESP	Xavier Escaich	26	8	15+8	8	3+0	0
