= 1992–93 RCD Español season =

RCD Español
1992–93 season
- President: Julio Pardo
- Head coach: Novoa (to 30 May); Juanjo Díaz (from 31 May)
- Stadium: Sarrià Stadium
- La Liga: 18th (relegated via playoff)
- Copa del Rey: Fourth round
- Top goalscorer: League: Xavier Escaich (12); All: Xavier Escaich (12)

The 1992–93 season was the 58th season in the existence of RCD Español and the club's third consecutive season in the top flight of Spanish football. In addition to the domestic league, Español participated in this season's edition of the Copa del Rey.

== Players ==
=== First-team squad ===
Note: Flags indicate national team as defined under FIFA eligibility rules; some limited exceptions apply. Players may hold more than one non-FIFA nationality.

No.	Pos.	Nation	Player
—	GK	ESP	Vicente Biurrun
—	GK	ESP	Emilio Isierte
—	DF	ESP	Albert Albesa
—	DF	ESP	Santi Cuesta
—	DF	RUS	Dmitri Galiamin
—	DF	ESP	César Mendiondo
—	DF	ESP	Mino
—	DF	RUS	Andrei Mokh
—	DF	ESP	Sergio Morgado
—	DF	ESP	Eloy Pérez
—	MF	ESP	Ángel Luis
—	MF	ESP	Enrique Ayúcar
—	MF	ESP	Juan José Elgezabal

No.	Pos.	Nation	Player
—	MF	ESP	Francisco
—	MF	ESP	Jaume
—	MF	RUS	Igor Korneev
—	MF	RUS	Dmitri Kuznetsov
—	MF	ESP	Roberto
—	MF	ESP	Urbano
—	MF	ESP	Vicente
—	FW	ESP	Enric Cuxart
—	FW	ESP	Xavier Escaich
—	FW	ESP	Gregorio Fonseca
—	FW	ESP	Jordi Lardín
—	FW	ESP	Lluís

== Competitions ==
=== Overall record ===
Competition	First match	Last match	Starting round	Final position	Record							
Competition	First match	Last match	Starting round	Final position	Pld	W	D	L	GF	GA	GD	Win %
La Liga	6 September 1992	20 June 1993	Matchday 1	18th	38	9	11	18	40	56	−16	23.68
Relegation playoff	23 June 1993	29 June 1993	Playoff	Relegated	2	0	1	1	0	1	−1	0.00
Copa del Rey	1 October 1992	30 December 1992	Third round	Fourth round	4	2	1	1	5	7	−2	50.00
Total					44	11	13	20	45	64	−19	25.00

=== La Liga ===
==== League table ====
Pos	Team	Pld	W	D	L	GF	GA	GD	Pts	Qualification or relegation
16	Oviedo	38	11	10	17	42	52	−10	32	
17	Albacete (O)	38	11	9	18	54	59	−5	31	Qualification for the relegation playoffs
18	Español (R)	38	9	11	18	40	56	−16	29	Qualification for the relegation playoffs
19	Cádiz (R)	38	5	12	21	30	70	−40	22 (Note: RBU 0–2 CÁD; CÁD 3–2 RBU)	Relegation to the Segunda División
20	Real Burgos (R)	38	4	14	20	29	69	−40	22	Relegation to the Segunda División

Source: LFP
Rules for classification: 1) points; 2) head-to-head points; 3) head-to-head goal difference; 4) head-to-head goals scored; 5) goal difference; 6) number of goals scored.
(O) Play-off winners; (R) Relegated

==== Results summary ====
Overall								Home						Away					
Pld	W	D	L	GF	GA	GD	Pts	W	D	L	GF	GA	GD	W	D	L	GF	GA	GD
38	9	11	18	40	56	−16	38	7	5	7	25	21	+4	2	6	11	15	35	−20

==== Matches ====
Date	Venue	Opponent	Score
6 September	A	Real Zaragoza	1–2
13 September	H	Atlético Madrid	1–3
20 September	H	Cádiz	1–3
27 September	A	Real Oviedo	2–2
4 October	H	Rayo Vallecano	2–2
7 October	A	Celta de Vigo	1–0
18 October	H	Sevilla	1–1
25 October	A	Osasuna	3–1
1 November	H	Real Sociedad	4–1
8 November	A	Real Madrid	1–3
22 November	H	Tenerife	0–0
29 November	A	Barcelona	0–5
6 December	H	Real Burgos	3–1
13 December	A	Sporting de Gijón	1–1
20 December	H	Albacete	2–0
3 January	A	Deportivo de La Coruña	0–3
9 January	H	Valencia	1–1
17 January	A	Logroñés	0–0
24 January	H	Athletic Bilbao	2–0

Date	Venue	Opponent	Score
31 January	H	Real Zaragoza	2–0
7 February	A	Atlético Madrid	1–2
14 February	A	Cádiz	0–1
21 February	H	Real Oviedo	2–0
28 February	A	Rayo Vallecano	1–1
7 March	H	Celta de Vigo	0–0
14 March	A	Sevilla	1–1
21 March	H	Osasuna	2–1
4 April	A	Real Sociedad	1–4
11 April	H	Real Madrid	1–3
18 April	A	Tenerife	1–2
2 May	H	Barcelona	0–1
9 May	A	Real Burgos	1–1
16 May	H	Sporting de Gijón	1–2
23 May	A	Albacete	0–2
30 May	H	Deportivo de La Coruña	0–2
6 June	A	Valencia	0–2
13 June	H	Logroñés	0–1
20 June	A	Athletic Bilbao	0–2

==== Relegation playoff ====
23 June 1993 First leg	Español	0–1	Racing de Santander	Barcelona
20:30		Report	Pineda 48'	Stadium: Sarrià Stadium; Attendance: 15,000; Referee: Manuel Díaz Vega

29 June 1993 Second leg	Racing de Santander	0–0	Español	Santander
21:15		Report		Stadium: El Sardinero; Attendance: 33,000; Referee: Antonio Jesús López Nieto

Racing de Santander won 1–0 on aggregate.

=== Copa del Rey ===
Round	Opponent	Aggregate	First leg			Second leg		
Round	Opponent	Aggregate	Date	Venue	Score	Date	Venue	Score
Third round	Manlleu	2–1	1 October	A	1–1	12 November	H	1–0
Fourth round	Villarreal	3–6	2 December	A	2–1	30 December	H	1–5

== Goalscorers ==
Rank	Player	La Liga	Copa del Rey	Total
1	(Spain) Xavier Escaich	12	0	12
2	(Russia) Igor Korneev	7	1	8
3	(Spain) Francisco	5	1	6
3	(Spain) Lluís	6	0	6
5	(Spain) Gregorio Fonseca	4	1	5
6	(Spain) Urbano	3	0	3
7	(Spain) Enrique Ayúcar	2	0	2
8	(Spain) Enric Cuxart	0	1	1
8	(Russia) Dmitri Kuznetsov	0	1	1
8	(Spain) Mino	1	0	1
Total		40	5	45
