= Juan Muñiz =

Juan Muñiz can refer to:

- Juan Muñiz (footballer, born 1992), Spanish footballer
- Juan Ramón López Muñiz, Spanish football manager
