= 2011–12 La Liga =

81st season of La Liga

La Liga
- Season: 2011–12
- Dates: 27 August 2011 – 13 May 2012
- Champions: Real Madrid; 32nd title
- Relegated: Villarreal; Sporting Gijón; Racing Santander
- Champions League: Real Madrid; Barcelona; Valencia; Málaga
- Europa League: Athletic Bilbao; Atlético Madrid; Levante
- Matches: 380
- Goals: 1,050 (2.76 per match)
- Top goalscorer: Lionel Messi (50 goals)
- Best goalkeeper: Víctor Valdés (0.8 goals/match)
- Biggest home win: Barcelona 8–0 Osasuna (17 September 2011)
- Biggest away win: Rayo Vallecano 0–7 Barcelona (29 April 2012)
- Highest scoring: Barcelona 8–0 Osasuna (17 September 2011); Real Madrid 6–2 Rayo Vallecano (24 September 2011); Real Madrid 7–1 Osasuna (6 November 2011); Sevilla 2–6 Real Madrid (17 December 2011); Levante 3–5 Rayo Vallecano (19 February 2012); Barcelona 5–3 Granada (20 March 2012)
- Longest winning run: 11 matches Barcelona; Real Madrid
- Longest unbeaten run: 23 matches Real Madrid
- Longest winless run: 20 matches Racing Santander
- Longest losing run: 6 matches Rayo Vallecano; Real Betis; Zaragoza
- Highest attendance: 99,252; Barcelona 1–2 Real Madrid (21 April 2012)
- Lowest attendance: 6,000; Getafe 1–0 Real Sociedad (17 March 2012)
- Total attendance: 11,504,567
- Average attendance: 28,265

The 2011–12 La Liga season (known as the Liga BBVA for sponsorship reasons) was the 81st season of the top level Spanish association football competition. The campaign began on 27 August 2011, and concluded on 13 May 2012. Real Madrid won a record 32nd title following victory over Athletic Bilbao on 2 May 2012.

Real Madrid broke a number of league records, including most points in a single season (100), most goals scored (121), best goal difference (+89), most away wins (16), and most overall wins (32). This season also saw Lionel Messi score a record 50 league goals in 37 games. Behind Messi was Real Madrid's Cristiano Ronaldo, who scored 46 goals; the pair's combined tally of 96 goals was the most ever by two players playing in the same major European league in the same season.

== Teams ==
Deportivo de La Coruña, Hércules CF from Alicante and UD Almería were relegated to the 2011–12 Segunda División after finishing in the bottom three spots of the table at the end of the 2010–11 season. Deportivo were relegated to the Segunda División after 20 seasons of continuous membership in the top football league of Spain, while Almería ended a four-year tenure in La Liga and Hércules made their immediate return to the second level.

The three relegated teams were replaced by three 2010–11 Segunda División sides. Champions Betis, who terminated their second-level status after two years, runners-up Rayo Vallecano, who returned to the top flight after eight seasons at lower levels, earned direct promotion.

The third promoted team was decided in the promotion play-offs where Granada CF returned to the league for the first time in 35 years, having spent 26 of them in Segunda División B and Tercera División.

=== Stadiums and locations ===
Location of teams in La Liga 2011–12

Team	Club home city	Stadium	Stadium capacity
Athletic Bilbao	Bilbao	San Mamés	39,750
Atlético Madrid	Madrid	Vicente Calderón	54,851
Barcelona	Barcelona	Camp Nou	99,354
Betis	Seville	Benito Villamarín	52,745
Espanyol	Barcelona	Cornellà-El Prat	40,500
Getafe	Getafe	Coliseum Alfonso Pérez	17,700
Granada	Granada	Nuevo Los Cármenes	22,524
Levante	Valencia	Ciutat de València	25,534
Málaga	Málaga	La Rosaleda	28,963
Mallorca	Palma	Iberostar Stadium	23,142
Osasuna	Pamplona	El Sadar	19,553
Racing Santander	Santander	El Sardinero	22,271
Rayo Vallecano	Madrid	Campo de Vallecas	15,489
Real Madrid	Madrid	Santiago Bernabéu	85,454
Real Sociedad	San Sebastián	Anoeta	32,076
Sevilla	Seville	Ramón Sánchez Pizjuán	45,500
Sporting de Gijón	Gijón	El Molinón	29,800
Valencia	Valencia	Mestalla	55,000
Villarreal	Vila-real	El Madrigal	25,000
Zaragoza	Zaragoza	La Romareda	34,596

=== Personnel and sponsorship ===
As in the previous years, Nike provided the official ball for all matches, with a new T90 Seitiro model which was used throughout the season.

Team	Head coach	Captain	Kitmaker	Shirt sponsor
Athletic Bilbao	(Argentina) Marcelo Bielsa	(Spain) Carlos Gurpegui	Umbro	Petronor
Atlético Madrid	(Argentina) Diego Simeone	(Spain) Antonio López	Nike	Rixos Hotels^{1}, Huawei^{2}, and Kyocera^{3}
Barcelona	(Spain) Pep Guardiola	(Spain) Carles Puyol	Nike	Qatar Foundation, UNICEF^{3} ^{4} and TV3^{5}
Espanyol	(Argentina) Mauricio Pochettino	(Argentina) Cristian Álvarez	Li-Ning	Cancún
Getafe	(Spain) Luis García	(Spain) Javier Casquero	Joma	Burger King and Confremar^{3}
Granada	(Spain) Abel Resino	(Spain) Manuel Lucena	Legea	Caja Granada
Levante	(Spain) Juan Ignacio Martínez	(Spain) Sergio Ballesteros	Luanvi	Comunitat Valenciana
Málaga	(Chile) Manuel Pellegrini	(Spain) Jesús Gámez	Nike	UNESCO^{7}
Mallorca	(Spain) Joaquín Caparrós	(Portugal) José Nunes	Macron	bet-at-home.com
Osasuna	(Spain) José Luis Mendilibar	(Spain) Francisco Puñal	Astore	CAN^{8}
Racing Santander	(Spain) Álvaro Cervera	(Spain) Pedro Munitis	Slam	Palacios
Rayo Vallecano	(Spain) José Ramón Sandoval	(Spain) Míchel	Erreà	Los Vengadores
Real Betis	(Spain) Pepe Mel	(Brazil) Iriney	RBb^{6}	Cirsa
Real Madrid	(Portugal) José Mourinho	(Spain) Iker Casillas	Adidas	Bwin
Real Sociedad	(France) Philippe Montanier	(Spain) Mikel Aranburu	Nike	Gipuzkoa Euskararekin Bat
Sevilla	(Spain) Míchel	(Spain) Andrés Palop	Li Ning	Pont Grup / Interwetten
Sporting de Gijón	(Spain) Javier Clemente	(Spain) David Barral	Kappa	Gijón^{9}, Asturias^{5} ^{9} and Doyen Group^{3}
Valencia	(Spain) Unai Emery	(Spain) David Albelda	Joma	JinKO Solar^{9}, Herbalife^{10} and MSC Cruceros^{11}
Villarreal	(Spain) Miguel Ángel Lotina	(Spain) Marcos Senna	Xtep	Comunitat Valenciana^{1}
Zaragoza	(Spain) Manolo Jiménez	(Spain) Javier Paredes	Adidas	Proniño

1. For 8 matches in round 20, 31–32, 34–38.
2. Only against Real Madrid in round 33.
3. On the back of shirt.
4. Barcelona makes a donation to UNICEF in order to display the charity's logo on the club's kit.
5. On the left sleeve.
6. Club's own brand.
7. Málaga makes a donation to UNESCO in order to display the charity's logo on the club's kit.
8. On the shoulders.
9. Since 31 January 2012.
10. On the shorts.
11. On the left sleeve.

=== Managerial changes ===
Team	Outgoing manager	Manner of departure	Date of vacancy	Replaced by	Date of appointment	Position in table
Atlético Madrid	(Spain) Quique Sánchez Flores	End of contract	24 May 2011	(Spain) Gregorio Manzano	8 June 2011	7th (2010–11)
Real Sociedad	(Uruguay) Martín Lasarte	Sacked	24 May 2011	(France) Philippe Montanier	4 June 2011	15th (2010–11)
Sevilla	(Spain) Gregorio Manzano	End of contract	25 May 2011	(Spain) Marcelino	3 June 2011	5th (2010–11)
Getafe	(Spain) Míchel	End of contract	30 May 2011	(Spain) Luis García	4 June 2011	16th (2010–11)
Racing Santander	(Spain) Marcelino	Mutual consent	3 June 2011	(Argentina) Héctor Cúper	29 June 2011	12th (2010–11)
Levante	(Spain) Luis García	Mutual consent	3 June 2011	(Spain) Juan Ignacio Martínez	9 June 2011	14th (2010–11)
Athletic Bilbao	(Spain) Joaquín Caparrós	End of contract	7 July 2011	(Argentina) Marcelo Bielsa	7 July 2011	6th (2010–11)
Mallorca	(Denmark) Michael Laudrup	Resigned	27 September 2011	(Spain) Miguel Ángel Nadal (as caretaker)	28 September 2011	11th
Mallorca	(Spain) Miguel Ángel Nadal	End of tenure as caretaker	3 October 2011	(Spain) Joaquín Caparrós	3 October 2011	11th
Racing Santander	(Argentina) Héctor Cúper	Mutual consent	29 November 2011	(Spain) Juanjo González	30 November 2011	20th
Villarreal	(Spain) Juan Carlos Garrido	Sacked	22 December 2011	(Spain) José Molina	22 December 2011	17th
Atlético Madrid	(Spain) Gregorio Manzano	Sacked	22 December 2011	(Argentina) Diego Simeone	23 December 2011	10th
Zaragoza	(Mexico) Javier Aguirre	Sacked	30 December 2011	(Spain) Manolo Jiménez	31 December 2011	20th
Granada	(Spain) Fabri	Sacked	22 January 2012	(Spain) Abel Resino	23 January 2012	18th
Sporting de Gijón	(Spain) Manolo Preciado	Sacked	31 January 2012	(Spain) Iñaki Tejada (as caretaker)	31 January 2012	19th
Sevilla	(Spain) Marcelino	Sacked	6 February 2012	(Spain) Míchel	7 February 2012	11th
Sporting de Gijón	(Spain) Iñaki Tejada	End of tenure as caretaker	13 February 2012	(Spain) Javier Clemente	13 February 2012	19th
Racing Santander	(Spain) Juanjo González	Sacked	7 March 2012	(Spain) Álvaro Cervera	9 March 2012	18th
Villarreal	(Spain) José Molina	Sacked	18 March 2012	(Spain) Miguel Ángel Lotina	19 March 2012	17th

== League table ==
Pos	Team	Pld	W	D	L	GF	GA	GD	Pts	Qualification or relegation
1	Real Madrid (C)	38	32	4	2	121	32	+89	100	Qualification for the Champions League group stage
2	Barcelona	38	28	7	3	114	29	+85	91	Qualification for the Champions League group stage
3	Valencia	38	17	10	11	59	44	+15	61	Qualification for the Champions League group stage
4	Málaga	38	17	7	14	54	53	+1	58	Qualification for the Champions League play-off round
5	Atlético Madrid	38	15	11	12	53	46	+7	56	Qualification for the Europa League group stage (Note: Atlético Madrid won the 2011–12 UEFA Europa League and thus secured the title holder spot in the group stage of the 2012–13 UEFA Europa League.)
6	Levante	38	16	7	15	54	50	+4	55	Qualification for the Europa League play-off round (Note: Athletic Bilbao qualified for the third qualifying round of the 2012–13 UEFA Europa League as runners-up of the 2011–12 Copa del Rey to Barcelona, who have qualified for the 2012–13 UEFA Champions League. Consequently, Levante entered the play-off round.)
7	Osasuna	38	13	15	10	44	61	−17	54	
8	Mallorca	38	14	10	14	42	46	−4	52	
9	Sevilla	38	13	11	14	48	47	+1	50	
10	Athletic Bilbao	38	12	13	13	49	52	−3	49	Qualification for the Europa League third qualifying round
11	Getafe	38	12	11	15	40	51	−11	47 (Note: GET: 8 pts; RSO: 5 pts; BET: 2 pts)	
12	Real Sociedad	38	12	11	15	46	52	−6	47	
13	Real Betis	38	13	8	17	47	56	−9	47	
14	Espanyol	38	12	10	16	46	56	−10	46	
15	Rayo Vallecano	38	13	4	21	53	73	−20	43 (Note: RVA 0–0 ZAR; ZAR 1–2 RVA)	
16	Zaragoza	38	12	7	19	36	61	−25	43	
17	Granada	38	12	6	20	35	56	−21	42	
18	Villarreal (R)	38	9	14	15	39	53	−14	41	Relegation to the Segunda División
19	Sporting Gijón (R)	38	10	7	21	42	69	−27	37	Relegation to the Segunda División
20	Racing Santander (R)	38	4	15	19	28	63	−35	27	Relegation to the Segunda División

Source: ESPN
Rules for classification: 1st points; 2nd head-to-head points; 3rd head-to-head goal difference; 4th head-to-head goals scored; 5th goal difference; 6th number of goals scored; 7th Fair-play points
(C) Champions; (R) Relegated

== Results ==
Home \ Away	ATH	ATM	FCB	BET	ESP	GET	GCF	LEV	MCF	MLL	OSA	RAC	RVA	RMA	RSO	SFC	RSG	VCF	VIL	ZAR
Athletic Bilbao		3–0	2–2	2–3	3–3	0–0	0–1	3–0	3–0	1–0	3–1	1–1	1–1	0–3	2–0	1–0	1–1	0–3	1–1	2–1
Atlético Madrid	2–1		1–2	0–2	3–1	3–0	2–0	3–2	2–1	1–1	0–0	4–0	3–1	1–4	1–1	0–0	4–0	0–0	3–0	3–1
Barcelona	2–0	5–0		4–2	4–0	4–0	5–3	5–0	4–1	5–0	8–0	3–0	4–0	1–2	2–1	0–0	3–1	5–1	5–0	4–0
Betis	2–1	2–2	2–2		1–1	1–1	1–2	0–1	0–0	1–0	1–0	1–1	0–2	2–3	2–3	1–1	2–0	2–1	3–1	4–3
Espanyol	2–1	4–2	1–1	1–0		1–0	3–0	1–2	1–2	1–0	1–2	3–1	5–1	0–4	2–2	1–1	0–3	4–0	0–0	0–2
Getafe	0–0	3–2	1–0	1–0	1–1		1–0	1–1	1–3	1–3	2–2	1–1	0–1	0–1	1–0	5–1	2–0	3–1	0–0	0–2
Granada	2–2	0–0	0–1	0–1	2–1	1–0		2–1	2–1	2–2	1–1	0–0	1–2	1–2	4–1	0–3	2–1	0–1	1–0	1–0
Levante	3–0	2–0	1–2	3–1	3–1	1–2	3–1		3–0	0–0	0–2	1–1	3–5	1–0	3–2	1–0	4–0	0–2	1–0	0–0
Málaga	1–0	0–0	1–4	0–2	2–1	3–2	4–0	1–0		3–1	1–1	3–0	4–2	0–4	1–1	2–1	1–0	1–0	2–1	5–1
Mallorca	1–1	2–1	0–2	1–0	1–0	1–2	0–0	1–0	0–1		1–1	2–1	1–0	1–2	2–1	0–0	1–2	1–1	4–0	1–0
Osasuna	2–1	0–1	3–2	2–1	2–0	0–0	2–1	2–0	1–1	2–2		0–2	0–0	1–5	1–0	0–0	2–1	1–1	2–1	3–0
Racing Santander	0–1	0–0	0–2	1–0	0–1	1–2	0–1	0–0	1–3	0–3	2–4		1–1	0–0	0–0	0–3	1–1	2–2	1–0	1–0
Rayo Vallecano	2–3	0–1	0–7	3–0	0–1	2–0	1–0	1–2	2–0	0–1	6–0	4–2		0–1	4–0	2–1	1–3	1–2	0–2	0–0
Real Madrid	4–1	4–1	1–3	4–1	5–0	4–2	5–1	4–2	1–1	4–1	7–1	4–0	6–2		5–1	3–0	3–1	0–0	3–0	3–1
Real Sociedad	1–2	0–4	2–2	1–1	0–0	0–0	1–0	1–3	3–2	1–0	0–0	3–0	4–0	0–1		2–0	5–1	1–0	1–1	3–0
Sevilla	1–2	1–1	0–2	1–2	0–0	3–0	1–2	1–1	2–1	3–1	2–0	2–2	5–2	2–6	1–0		2–1	1–0	1–2	3–0
Sporting Gijón	1–1	1–1	0–1	2–1	1–2	2–1	2–0	3–2	2–1	2–3	1–1	0–0	2–1	0–3	1–2	1–0		0–1	2–3	1–2
Valencia	1–1	1–0	2–2	4–0	2–1	3–1	1–0	1–1	2–0	2–2	4–0	4–3	4–1	2–3	0–1	1–2	4–0		1–0	1–2
Villarreal	2–2	0–1	0–0	1–0	0–0	1–2	3–1	0–3	2–1	2–0	1–1	1–1	2–0	1–1	1–1	2–2	3–0	2–2		2–2
Zaragoza	2–0	1–0	1–4	0–2	2–1	1–1	1–0	1–0	0–0	0–1	1–1	2–1	1–2	0–6	2–0	0–1	2–2	0–1	2–1	

Source: LFP, Sportec
Legend: Blue = home team win; Yellow = draw; Red = away team win.

== Awards ==
=== La Liga Awards ===
La Liga's governing body, the Liga Nacional de Fútbol Profesional, honoured the competition's best players and coach with the La Liga Awards.

Award	Recipient
Best Player	(Argentina) Lionel Messi (Barcelona)
Best Coach	(Spain) Pep Guardiola (Barcelona)
Best Goalkeeper	(Spain) Iker Casillas (Real Madrid)
Best Defender	(Spain) Sergio Ramos (Real Madrid)
Best Midfielder(s)	(Spain) Xabi Alonso (Real Madrid) (Spain) Andrés Iniesta (Barcelona)
Best Forward	(Argentina) Lionel Messi (Barcelona)

==== Team of the Year ====

Team of the Year
Goalkeeper	(Spain) Víctor Valdés (Barcelona)			
Defenders	(Spain) Carles Puyol (Barcelona)		(Spain) Sergio Ramos (Real Madrid)	(Spain) Jordi Alba (Valencia)
Midfielders	(Spain) Santi Cazorla (Málaga)	(Spain) Óscar de Marcos (Athletic Bilbao)	(Spain) Xabi Alonso (Real Madrid)	(Germany) Mesut Özil (Real Madrid)
Forwards	(Argentina) Lionel Messi (Barcelona)		(Portugal) Cristiano Ronaldo (Real Madrid)	(Colombia) Radamel Falcao (Atlético Madrid)

=== Top goalscorers ===
The Pichichi Trophy is awarded by the newspaper Marca to the player who scores the most goals in a season.

Rank	Player	Club	Goals
1	(Argentina) Lionel Messi	Barcelona	50
2	(Portugal) Cristiano Ronaldo	Real Madrid	46
3	(Colombia) Radamel Falcao	Atlético Madrid	24
4	(Argentina) Gonzalo Higuaín	Real Madrid	22
5	(France) Karim Benzema	Real Madrid	21
6	(Spain) Fernando Llorente	Athletic Bilbao	17
6	(Spain) Roberto Soldado	Valencia	17
8	(Spain) Rubén Castro	Real Betis	16
9	(Ivory Coast) Arouna Koné	Levante	15
9	(Spain) Michu	Rayo Vallecano	15

Source: Liga BBVA

=== Top assists ===
Rank	Player	Club	Assists
1	(Germany) Mesut Özil	Real Madrid	17
2	(Argentina) Ángel Di María	Real Madrid	16
2	(Argentina) Lionel Messi	Barcelona	16
4	(Spain) Jesús Navas	Sevilla	12
4	(Portugal) Cristiano Ronaldo	Real Madrid	12
6	(Brazil) Dani Alves	Barcelona	11
7	(Spain) Xabi Alonso	Real Madrid	9
7	(Uruguay) Chory Castro	Mallorca	9
7	(Spain) Andrés Iniesta	Barcelona	9

- Source: LFP

=== Zamora Trophy ===
The Ricardo Zamora Trophy is awarded by newspaper Marca to the goalkeeper with the lowest ratio of goals conceded to matches played. A goalkeeper had to play at least 28 matches of 60 or more minutes to be eligible for the trophy.

Rank	Player	Club	Goals against	Matches	Average
1	(Spain) Víctor Valdés	Barcelona	28	35	0.80
2	(Spain) Iker Casillas	Real Madrid	31	37	0.84
3	(Belgium) Thibaut Courtois	Atlético Madrid	41	36	1.14
4	(Israel) Dudu Aouate	Mallorca	46	36	1.28
5	(Spain) Miguel Ángel Moyà	Getafe	48	36	1.33

=== Fair Play award ===
This award was given annually since 1999 to the team with the best fair play during the season. This ranking takes into account aspects such as cards, suspension of matches, audience behaviour and other penalties. This section not only aims to determine the best fair play, but also serves to break the tie in teams that are tied in all the other rules: points, head-to-head, goal difference and goals scored.

Rank	Club	Matches	Yellow card	Double Yellow Card/Ejection	Direct Red Card	Games of Suspension (Player, only when +3)	Games of Suspension (Club's Personnel)	Audience Behaviour		Total Points
1	Barcelona	38	79	2	1	–	1^{9}	–	–	91
1	Málaga	38	70	2	4	–	–	1 Mild^{29}	–	91
3	Villarreal	38	86	4	2	–	3^{8,13,21}	–	–	115
4	Real Sociedad	38	73	6	3	–	2^{24,29}	3 Milds^{7,9,27}	–	119
5	Athletic Bilbao	38	101	6	1	–	1^{6}	1 Mild^{20}	–	126
6	Real Madrid	38	91	3	2	–	4^{15,25,29,29}	1 Mild^{28}	–	128
7	Levante	38	120	5	0	–	–	1 Mild^{35}	–	135
8	Racing Santander	38	117	3	3	–	1^{2}	–	–	137
9	Osasuna	38	98	4	2	–	4^{20,27,31,34}	1 Serious^{27}	–	138
10	Sporting Gijón	38	117	5	0	–	1^{20}	2 Milds^{15,20}	–	142
11	Rayo Vallecano	38	125	1	2	–	1^{11}	1 Mild^{5}	–	143
12	Mallorca	38	118	2	4	–	1^{19}	1 Mild^{30}	–	144
13	Atlético Madrid	38	131	2	2	–	–	1 Mild^{33}	–	146
14	Real Betis	38	104	3	4	–	1^{35}	5 Milds^{1,5,14,18,36}	–	152
14	Valencia	38	127	1	6	–	1^{28}	–	–	152
16	Getafe	38	120	4	4	–	3^{3,15,23}	–	–	155
17	Sevilla	38	112	6	3	–	–	5 Milds^{8,13,19,20,35}	–	158
18	Espanyol	38	130	4	2	–	2^{6, 17}	1 Mild^{18}	–	159
19	Zaragoza	38	126	5	3	–	2^{26,32}	1 Mild^{20}	–	160
20	Granada	38	107	4	5	18^{37}	2^{37}	1 Very Serious^{13}	–	165

Source: 2011–12 Fair Play Rankings Season

Sources of cards and penalties: Referee's reports, Competition Committee's Sanctions, Appeal Committee Resolutions and RFEF's Directory about Fair Play Rankings

Legend:

Icon	Term	Points of sanction	Description
	Yellow Card	1 point/yellow card	
	Double Yellow Card/Ejection	2 points/double yellow card	
	Direct Red Card	3 points/red card	
	Games of Suspension (Player)	As many as banned games	When a player is banned for play more than 3 future games. This punishment overrides the possible red card which caused this sanction
	Games of Suspension (Club's Personnel)	5 points/banned game	When some person of the club (not player) is banned for x future games. This punishment overrides the possible red card which caused this sanction
	Audience Behaviour	Mild (5 points); Serious (6 points); Very Serious (7 points)	When the audience makes some altercations such as explosions, flares, throwing objects to the ground, racist chanting, etc.
	Closure of Stadium	10 points/match with closured stadium	When serious incidents happen which are punished by the closure of the stadium
It also accounts cards to non-players
The number in superscript is the corresponding round to the sanction
Important note: This table is not a count of cards and sanctions resulting from the matches, this table takes into account the removal or application of some cards and sanctions by the competent bodies (Competition Committee, Appeal Committee and Spanish Sports Disciplinary Committee)

=== Pedro Zaballa award ===
Comité Técnico de Árbitros de Fútbol de Las Palmas

=== Scoring ===
- First goal of the season:
  (Spain) Imanol Agirretxe for Real Sociedad against Sporting de Gijón (27 August 2011)
- Last goal of the season:
  (Brazil) Rovérsio for Osasuna against Racing Santander (13 May 2012)

=== Hat-tricks ===
Player	For	Against	Result	Date	Reference
(Spain) Roberto Soldado	Valencia	Racing Santander	4–3 (H)	27 August 2011	
(Portugal) Cristiano Ronaldo	Real Madrid	Zaragoza	6–0 (A)	28 August 2011	
(Argentina) Lionel Messi	Barcelona	Osasuna	8–0 (H)	17 September 2011	
(Colombia) Radamel Falcao	Atlético Madrid	Racing Santander	4–0 (H)	18 September 2011	
(Portugal) Cristiano Ronaldo	Real Madrid	Rayo Vallecano	6–2 (H)	24 September 2011	
(Argentina) Lionel Messi	Barcelona	Atlético Madrid	5–0 (H)	24 September 2011	
(Argentina) Gonzalo Higuaín	Real Madrid	Espanyol	4–0 (A)	2 October 2011	
(Argentina) Gonzalo Higuaín	Real Madrid	Real Betis	4–1 (H)	15 October 2011	
(Portugal) Cristiano Ronaldo	Real Madrid	Málaga	4–0 (A)	22 October 2011	
(Argentina) Lionel Messi	Barcelona	Mallorca	5–0 (H)	29 October 2011	
(Portugal) Cristiano Ronaldo	Real Madrid	Osasuna	7–1 (H)	6 November 2011	
(Portugal) Cristiano Ronaldo	Real Madrid	Sevilla	6–2 (A)	17 December 2011	
(Colombia) Radamel Falcao	Atlético Madrid	Real Sociedad	4–0 (A)	21 January 2012	
(Argentina) Lionel Messi	Barcelona	Málaga	4–1 (A)	22 January 2012	
(Spain) Fernando Llorente	Athletic Bilbao	Rayo Vallecano	3–2 (A)	28 January 2012	
(Portugal) Cristiano Ronaldo	Real Madrid	Levante	4–2 (H)	12 February 2012	
(Argentina) Lionel Messi^{4}	Barcelona	Valencia	5–1 (H)	19 February 2012	
(Nigeria) Kalu Uche	Espanyol	Rayo Vallecano	5–1 (H)	11 March 2012	
(Spain) Roberto Soldado	Valencia	Athletic Bilbao	3–0 (A)	18 March 2012	
(Argentina) Lionel Messi	Barcelona	Granada	5–3 (H)	20 March 2012	
(Portugal) Cristiano Ronaldo	Real Madrid	Atlético Madrid	4–1 (A)	11 April 2012	
(Argentina) Lionel Messi	Barcelona	Málaga	4–1 (H)	2 May 2012	
(Argentina) Lionel Messi^{4}	Barcelona	Espanyol	4–0 (H)	5 May 2012	

^{4} Player scored four goals
(H) – Home; (A) – Away

== Attendances ==
#	Football club	Home games	Average attendance
1	FC Barcelona	19	78,340
2	Real Madrid	19	74,258
3	Atlético de Madrid	19	40,526
4	Valencia CF	19	38,921
5	Sevilla FC	19	36,047
6	Real Betis	19	35,820
7	Athletic Club	19	33,974
8	Málaga CF	19	26,599
9	RCD Espanyol	19	23,499
10	Real Sociedad	19	23,135
11	Real Zaragoza	19	23,114
12	Sporting de Gijón	19	21,838
13	Granada CF	19	20,526
14	Villarreal CF	19	17,053
15	CA Osasuna	19	15,674
16	RCD Mallorca	19	13,526
17	Racing de Santander	19	13,387
18	Levante UD	19	12,662
19	Rayo Vallecano	19	10,900
20	Getafe CF	19	9,447

== See also ==
- List of Spanish football transfers summer 2011
- List of Spanish football transfers winter 2011–12
- 2011–12 Segunda División
