= 1997–98 UE Lleida season =

UE Lleida
1997–98 season
- President: Màrius Durán
- Manager: Juande Ramos
- Grounds: Camp d'Esports
- Segunda División: 5th
- Copa del Rey: Second Round
- Copa Catalunya: Group Stage
- Ciutat de Lleida Trophy: 2nd Place
- Top goalscorer: League: Óscar Arias; Vicente Fernández; All: Óscar Arias; Vicente Fernández; Antonio Calderón

This is a complete list of appearances by members of the professional playing squad of UE Lleida during the 1997–98 season.

No.		Player	Pos	Lge Apps	Lge Gls	Cup Apps	Cup Gls	Tot Apps	Tot Gls	Date signed	Previous club
Goalkeepers
1	(Spain)	Emilio Isierte	GK	7	-	1	-	8	-	1994	Sporting
25	(Spain)	Raúl Ojeda	GK	35	-	3	-	38	-	1996	Gavà
Defenders
2	(Nigeria)	Michael Emenalo	DF	22	1	-	-	22	1	1997	San José
4	(Spain)	Andrés de la Rosa	DF	8 (3)	-	2	-	10 (3)	-	1996	Real Oviedo
5	(Spain)	Javier Espejo	DF	37	1	3	-	40	1	1997	Las Palmas
6	(Spain)	José Manuel Tárraga	DF	26 (3)	-	2 (1)	-	28 (4)	-	1997	Celta
11	(Spain)	Javier Oliete	DF	17 (4)	1	1 (1)	-	18 (5)	1	1997	Sporting
15	(Spain)	Miguel Hernández	DF	14 (8)	-	2	-	16 (8)	-	1997	Salamanca
19	(Spain)	Francesc Navarro	DF	41	-	3 (1)	-	44 (1)	-	1997	Logroñés
Midfielders
8	(Spain)	Antonio Roa	MF	24 (13)	5	2 (2)	1	26 (15)	6	1994	Mérida
10	(Spain)	Antonio Calderón	MF	35 (2)	7	2	1	37 (2)	8	1996	Rayo Vallecano
14	(Spain)	Tito Vilanova	MF	11 (10)	3	2	-	13 (10)	3	1997	Mallorca
17	(Spain)	José Carlos Rodríguez	MF	0 (12)	-	1 (1)	-	1 (13)	-	1997	Real Murcia
18	(Spain)	Óscar Arias	MF	36	8	2 (1)	-	38 (1)	8	1996	Alavés
20	(Spain)	Josep Setvalls	MF	41	4	2	-	43	4	1997	Barça Atlètic
21	(Spain)	Vicente Fernández	MF	31 (5)	8	3	-	34 (5)	8	1994	Espanyol B
22	(Spain)	Vicente Simeón	MF	7 (11)	1	2	2	9 (11)	3	1997	Villarreal
24	(Spain)	Marc Carballo	MF	0 (2)	-	1	-	1 (2)	-	1997	Barça C
26	(Spain)	Jordi Esteve	MF	0 (2)	-	-	-	0 (2)	-	1997	Academy
Forwards
3	(Federal Republic of Yugoslavia)	Rahim Beširović	CF	2 (4)	1	2 (2)	-	4 (6)	1	1996	Partizan
7	(Spain)	Gerard Escoda	CF	37 (4)	3	3 (1)	1	40 (5)	4	1996	Nàstic
9	(Croatia)	Elvis Scoria	CF	13 (5)	1	2	1	15 (5)	2	1997	Zagreb
12	(Brazil)	Helcinho Conegudes	CF	1 (9)	-	1	-	2 (9)	-	1997	Farense
16	(Spain)	Gorka Bidaurrázaga	CF	1 (5)	-	-	-	1 (5)	-	1997	Badajoz
23	(Japan)	Soutaro Yasunaga	CF	16 (18)	4	2	2	18 (18)	6	1997	Marinos
