= Iñaki Tejada =

Spanish footballer and manager

Personal information
- Full name: Iñaki Tejada Fernández
- Date of birth: 19 November 1965 (age 60)
- Place of birth: Bilbao, Spain
- Position: Midfielder

Youth career
- Iturrigorri
- 1979–1985: Athletic Bilbao

Senior career*
Years	Team	Apps	(Gls)
1985–1988	Bilbao Athletic	13	(0)
1987	→ Sestao (loan)	0	(0)
1987–1988	→ Lemona (loan)		
1988–1989	Marbella		
1989–1990	Hospitalet		
1990–1991	Gandía		
1991–1992	Lugo	17	(0)
Total		30	(0)

Managerial career
- 1996–1998: Sporting Gijón (youth)
- 1998–2003: Sporting B (assistant)
- 2003–2012: Sporting Gijón (assistant)
- 2012: Sporting Gijón
- 2012–2014: Sporting B (assistant)
- 2014–2017: Sporting Gijón (assistant)
- 2017–2019: Alavés (assistant)
- 2020: Espanyol (analyst)
- * Club domestic league appearances and goals

Iñaki Tejada Fernández (born 19 November 1965) is a Spanish retired footballer who played as a midfielder.

== Career ==
Born in Bilbao, Biscay, Basque Country, Tejada joined Athletic Bilbao's youth setup in 1979, aged 13, after starting it out at SD Iturrigorri. Promoted to the reserves in 1985, he made his professional debut on 27 April of the following year, coming on as a second-half substitute for Roberto Martínez in a 1–6 Segunda División home loss against CD Málaga.

After appearing sparingly, Tejada served loans at Sestao River Club and SD Lemona, suffering a severe knee injury while at the latter. He would subsequently represent CA Marbella, CE L'Hospitalet, CF Gandía and CD Lugo, the latter in Segunda División B.

After retiring at the age of just 27 due to injuries, Tejada joined Sporting de Gijón's youth setup as a coach. In 1998, he was appointed Marcelino García Toral's assistant at the club's reserve team, being also with the manager in the main squad.

Tejada remained at Mareo after Marcelino's departure, being an assistant of both Ciriaco Cano and Manolo Preciado. On 31 January 2012, after Preciado's dismissal, he was appointed manager of the first team.

Tejada was in charge of the Asturians for two matches (a 1–1 draw against CA Osasuna and a 0–4 defeat against Valencia CF) before being replaced by Javier Clemente.

Tejada was appointed Abelardo Fernández's assistant at Sporting B for the 2012–13 campaign. On 5 May 2014, after the manager's promotion to the first team, he remained as his second fiddle.

From 2017 to 2019, he accompanied Abelardo Fernández once again, this time at Alavés. At the end of December 2019, he was appointed analyst under Abelardo at Espanyol. They left the club in June 2020.
