= Eloy Pérez (footballer) =

Spanish footballer

Personal information
- Full name: Eloy Pérez García
- Date of birth: 25 March 1965 (age 61)
- Place of birth: Barcelona, Spain
- Height: 1.70 m (5 ft 7 in)
- Position: Right-back

Senior career*
Years	Team	Apps	(Gls)
1986–1987	L'Hospitalet	67	(0)
1987–1994	Español	159	(1)
1994–1995	Palamós	15	(0)
1995–1996	Deportivo Alavés	32	(0)
1996–1998	Palamós	64	(1)
Total		337	(2)
- * Club domestic league appearances and goals

Eloy Pérez García (born 25 March 1965) is a Spanish former professional footballer who played as a right-back. He played in La Liga for Español, making a total of 123 top flight appearances.

== Club career ==
Born in Barcelona, Catalonia, Pérez started his career with L'Hospitalet in 1986. He joined Español in 1987, and over the next seven years played 181 matches for the club. He experienced La Liga relegation with Español twice, in 1988–89 and 1992–93, but also helped the club to promotion at the first attempt on both occasions, including as Segunda División champions in 1993–94. By this time, he was captain of the Español team.

Following this triumph, Pérez did not join Español back in the top flight, instead remaining in the second tier with Palamós. His new club suffered relegation at the end of the 1994–95 season, and Pérez then moved on again, spending one more year in the Segunda División with Deportivo Alavés before rejoining Palamós, now in the Tercera División, in 1996. He played a key part as Palamós won their Tercera División group in 1996–97. Pérez retired in 1998, aged 33.

== Retirement ==
Pérez later went on to become the sporting director of former club Espanyol.

== Honours ==
Español

- Segunda División: 1993–94
- UEFA Cup: Runners-up 1987–88

Palamós

- Tercera División: 1996–97
