= Luis Pérez (footballer, born 1971) =

Spanish footballer

Personal information
- Full name: Luis Pérez Pascual
- Date of birth: 9 February 1971 (age 55)
- Place of birth: San Sebastián, Spain
- Height: 1.79 m (5 ft 10 1/2 in)
- Position: Forward

Youth career
- Hernani
- Real Sociedad

Senior career*
Years	Team	Apps	(Gls)
1989–1991	Real Sociedad B	40	(10)
1990–1999	Real Sociedad	185	(24)
1999–2000	Osasuna	5	(0)
2000–2001	Real Unión	28	(4)
Total		258	(38)

International career
1991	Spain U23	1	(0)
1997	Basque Country	1	(0)
- * Club domestic league appearances and goals

Luis Pérez Pascual (born 9 February 1971 in San Sebastián, Basque Country) is a Spanish former professional footballer who played as a forward.
