= Roberto Martínez (footballer, born 1966) =

Spanish footballer

Personal information
- Full name: Roberto Martínez Celigueta
- Date of birth: 21 February 1966 (age 60)
- Place of birth: Pamplona, Spain
- Height: 1.76 m (5 ft 9 1/2 in)
- Position: Forward

Senior career*
Years	Team	Apps	(Gls)
1983–1987	Bilbao Athletic	85	(11)
1986–1989	Athletic Bilbao	18	(2)
1989–1991	UD Salamanca	66	(21)
1991–1993	Real Valladolid	23	(3)
1993–1994	Palamos CF	36	(18)
1994–1995	Mérida UD	23	(8)
1995–1996	UD Almería	35	(8)
1996–1998	Granada CF	29	(4)

International career
1983	Spain U18	1	(1)
- * Club domestic league appearances and goals

Roberto Martínez Celigueta (born 21 February 1966) is a former Spanish footballer.

He is the brother of Daniel Martínez Celigueta, also a footballer.
