= Enric Cuxart =

Spanish footballer

Personal information
- Full name: Enric Cuxart Vaquer
- Date of birth: 27 March 1967 (age 59)
- Place of birth: Cornellà de Llobregat, Spain
- Height: 1.95 m (6 ft 5 in)
- Position: Forward

Youth career
- Cornellà

Senior career*
Years	Team	Apps	(Gls)
- Cornellà
1987–1989	Mestalla		
1989–1991	Valencia	28	(9)
1991–1993	Espanyol	13	(3)
1993	Las Palmas	14	(5)
1993–1994	Córdoba	35	(11)
1994–1995	Cartagena	13	(11)
1995–1997	Elche	84	(42)
1997–1998	CD Badajoz	22	(3)
1998–2000	Real Murcia	57	(20)
- * Club domestic league appearances and goals

Enric Cuxart Vaquer (born 27 March 1967) is a former Spanish footballer who played as a forward.

== Career ==
Born in Cornellà de Llobregat, Catalonia, Cuxart began his career with hometown club Cornellà. In 1987, Cuxart signed for Valencia's reserve team, Mestalla. On 6 May 1990, Cuxart scored a 14-minute hat-trick on his second appearance for Valencia, in a 4–0 win against Logroñés. In 1991, Cuxart signed for Espanyol. After 13 appearances and three goals, Cuxart signed for Segunda División B side Las Palmas in 1993. After a short stint at Las Palmas, Cuxart signed for Córdoba, before signing for Cartagena in 1994. In early 1995, Cuxart signed for Elche. Cuxart scored 42 league goals in 84 games for Elche, before signing for CD Badajoz in 1997. In 1998, Cuxart joined Real Murcia, playing for the club for two seasons before his retirement.
