= 1988–89 Segunda División =

58th season of the second-tier football league in Spain

Segunda División
- Season: 1988–89
- Champions: CD Castellón
- Promoted: CD Castellón; Rayo Vallecano; CD Tenerife; RCD Mallorca
- Relegated: Barcelona Atlètic; UD Alzira; UE Lleida; CFJ Mollerussa
- Matches: 380
- Goals: 859 (2.26 per match)
- Top goalscorer: (Spain) Quique Estebaranz

The 1988–89 Segunda División season saw 20 teams participate in the second flight Spanish league. CD Castellón won the league.

CD Castellón, Rayo Vallecano, CD Tenerife and RCD Mallorca were promoted to Primera División. Barcelona Atlètic, UD Alzira, UE Lleida and CFJ Mollerussa were relegated to Segunda División B.

== Teams ==
Location of teams in Segunda División 1988-89
Canary Islands

Team	Home city	Stadium
Alzira	Alzira	Luis Suñer Picó
Barcelona Atlètic	Barcelona	Mini Estadi
Real Burgos	Burgos	El Plantío
Castellón	Castellón de la Plana	Castàlia
Castilla	Madrid	Ciudad Deportiva
Deportivo La Coruña	A Coruña	Riazor
Eibar	Eibar	Ipurua
Figueres	Figueres	Vilatenim
Las Palmas	Las Palmas	Insular
Lleida	Lleida	Camp d'Esports
Mallorca	Palma de Mallorca	Lluís Sitjar
CFJ Mollerussa	Mollerussa	Camp Municipal
Racing de Santander	Santander	El Sardinero
Rayo Vallecano	Madrid	Vallecas
Recreativo de Huelva	Huelva	Colombino
Sabadell	Sabadell	Nova Creu Alta
Salamanca	Villares de la Reina	Helmántico
Sestao Sport	Sestao	Las Llanas
Tenerife	Santa Cruz de Tenerife	Heliodoro Rodríguez López
Xerez	Jerez de la Frontera	Chapín

== Final table ==
Pos	Team	Pld	W	D	L	GF	GA	GD	Pts	Promotion or relegation
1	CD Castellón	38	21	9	8	49	29	+20	51	Promoted to Primera División
2	Rayo Vallecano	38	19	11	8	61	36	+25	49	Promoted to Primera División
3	CD Tenerife	38	20	8	10	54	36	+18	48	Promotion playoff
4	RCD Mallorca	38	21	6	11	51	26	+25	48	Promotion playoff
5	Recreativo de Huelva	38	16	10	12	46	36	+10	42	
6	Racing de Santander	38	17	8	13	56	43	+13	42	
7	UD Salamanca	38	14	14	10	35	33	+2	42	
8	Sestao	38	14	13	11	39	32	+7	41	
9	UE Figueres	38	16	9	13	52	50	+2	41	
10	Deportivo de La Coruña	38	16	8	14	43	35	+8	40	
11	UD Las Palmas	38	15	10	13	52	53	−1	40	
12	Xerez CD	38	13	14	11	40	38	+2	40	
13	CE Sabadell FC	38	15	9	14	49	43	+6	39	
14	Real Burgos	38	9	18	11	27	34	−7	36	
15	Castilla CF	38	13	10	15	50	59	−9	36	
16	SD Eibar	38	8	18	12	36	42	−6	34	
17	Barcelona Atlètic	38	8	12	18	42	58	−16	28	Relegated to Segunda División B
18	UD Alzira	38	9	8	21	29	58	−29	26	Relegated to Segunda División B
19	UE Lleida	38	8	10	20	29	43	−14	26	Relegated to Segunda División B
20	CFJ Mollerussa	38	3	5	30	19	75	−56	11	Relegated to Segunda División B

Source: BDFutbol

== Results ==
Home \ Away	ALZ	BAR	BUR	CAS	CST	DEP	EIB	FIG	LPA	LLE	MLL	MOL	RAC	RAY	REC	SAB	SAL	SES	TEN	XER
Alzira	—	0–0	1–0	1–5	0–1	2–1	1–1	2–3	2–1	1–0	0–1	2–0	3–2	1–2	1–1	1–4	0–0	2–1	1–2	1–2
Barcelona At.	2–0	—	2–2	0–1	2–2	1–0	1–1	1–2	4–1	1–1	0–1	2–0	2–3	0–2	1–0	3–3	0–2	3–0	0–3	1–1
Real Burgos	0–0	1–1	—	0–0	2–0	1–0	0–0	2–5	1–2	1–1	2–1	3–0	1–0	1–1	1–2	1–0	0–1	0–0	1–1	1–1
Castellón	2–1	1–0	1–0	—	6–0	1–1	0–0	1–2	1–0	4–2	0–0	3–1	2–1	1–0	1–0	1–0	0–0	1–0	1–0	1–1
Castilla	3–1	3–2	2–0	2–1	—	1–2	3–1	1–0	0–4	3–0	0–0	3–0	2–1	0–2	0–0	2–3	2–1	1–1	1–2	0–1
Deportivo	0–0	1–1	3–0	1–1	2–1	—	1–0	0–2	4–0	0–0	0–1	4–0	1–2	1–2	2–1	2–0	0–1	1–0	1–3	0–0
Eibar	3–0	1–1	0–0	2–0	1–1	1–1	—	3–3	1–0	0–0	0–1	2–1	2–2	2–0	1–0	2–2	0–0	0–0	2–2	0–0
Figueres	3–1	2–4	0–0	0–1	4–2	1–2	3–1	—	2–2	1–0	2–1	5–3	1–0	0–1	0–1	2–0	0–0	0–2	1–0	1–1
Las Palmas	2–1	0–0	0–1	1–0	4–1	4–0	2–0	0–1	—	1–0	1–3	2–1	1–3	0–6	0–0	2–0	0–2	1–0	2–2	0–0
Lleida	0–0	1–0	3–0	0–1	1–1	0–1	1–2	1–1	3–0	—	0–1	1–2	1–1	2–4	0–1	0–0	3–0	2–0	0–2	2–1
Mallorca	3–0	1–0	2–0	0–1	0–1	1–0	1–0	0–0	2–3	3–0	—	2–0	2–0	2–0	3–0	1–1	2–1	5–0	1–2	1–2
Mollerussa	0–0	1–0	0–1	0–3	1–1	0–2	1–1	0–1	0–4	1–2	1–2	—	1–2	2–2	0–2	0–4	0–1	0–4	0–1	0–1
Racing	2–0	7–0	1–1	4–0	2–0	1–2	1–0	3–1	1–1	1–1	1–0	1–0	—	1–2	1–1	1–2	0–0	2–1	1–0	2–1
Rayo	3–0	0–0	0–0	1–3	1–2	2–1	5–1	0–0	4–4	1–0	1–1	2–0	1–2	—	2–2	1–0	2–0	1–1	1–0	4–1
Recreativo	1–2	3–2	0–0	1–1	1–1	0–0	1–0	4–0	0–1	2–0	1–3	3–0	1–0	1–2	—	2–1	3–1	1–0	1–1	4–1
Sabadell	0–1	1–0	2–1	1–0	3–2	3–0	2–1	1–0	2–2	0–1	0–1	2–1	0–0	1–1	3–1	—	3–1	0–0	1–1	1–0
Salamanca	1–0	2–1	0–0	0–1	2–2	0–2	1–0	2–0	1–1	2–0	1–1	1–2	2–3	1–0	1–0	2–1	—	1–1	1–1	0–0
Sestao Sport	1–0	4–0	1–1	2–0	2–1	1–0	1–2	1–1	1–1	1–0	2–1	0–0	1–0	2–1	2–0	2–1	0–0	—	3–0	1–1
Tenerife	2–0	3–0	0–1	2–0	1–0	0–3	2–1	4–2	3–1	1–0	2–0	2–0	2–0	0–0	1–2	3–1	1–2	0–0	—	2–0
Xerez	3–0	1–4	0–0	2–2	2–2	0–1	1–1	2–0	0–1	1–0	1–0	1–0	4–1	0–1	0–2	1–0	1–1	1–0	4–0	—

Source: BDFutbol
Legend: Blue = home team win; Yellow = draw; Red = away team win.

== Promotion playoff ==
Team 1	Agg.	Team 2	1st leg	2nd leg
RCD Español	1–2 (a.e.t.)	RCD Mallorca	1–0	0–2
CD Tenerife	4–1	Real Betis	4–0	0–1

=== First leg ===
28 June 1989	RCD Español	1–0	RCD Mallorca	Barcelona
	Golobart 58'	Report (in Spanish)		Stadium: Sarrià; Attendance: 37,000; Referee: Victoriano Sánchez Arminio (Cantabria)

28 June 1989	CD Tenerife	4–0	Real Betis	Santa Cruz de Tenerife
	Rommel Fernández 29', 45'; Julio 77' (o.g.); El Ghareff 79'	Report (in Spanish)		Stadium: Heliodoro Rodríguez López; Attendance: 20,000; Referee: José María Enriquez Negreira (Catalonia)

=== Second leg ===
2 July 1989	RCD Mallorca	2–0 (a.e.t.) (2–1 agg.)	RCD Español	Palma de Mallorca
	Nadal 12'; Vidal 93'	Report & Report(in Spanish)		Stadium: Lluís Sitjar; Attendance: 16,500; Referee: Joaquín Urío Velázquez (Basque Country (autonomous community))

2 July 1989	Real Betis	1–0 (1–4 agg.)	CD Tenerife	Seville
	Chano 80'	Report (in Spanish)		Stadium: Benito Villamarín; Attendance: 47,000; Referee: Joaquín Ramos Marco (Castile and León)

== Pichichi Trophy for Top Goalscorers ==
Last updated June 21, 2009

Goalscorers	Goals	Team
(Spain) Quique Estebaranz	23	Racing de Santander
(Spain) Pepe Mel	21	CD Castellón
(Spain) Jesús Rosagro	20	Castilla CF
