= Quique Estebaranz =

Spanish footballer (born 1965)

Personal information
- Full name: Juan Enrique Estebaranz López
- Date of birth: 6 October 1965 (age 61)
- Place of birth: Madrid, Spain
- Height: 1.74 m (5 ft 9 in)
- Position: Forward

Youth career
- 1983–1984: Atlético Madrid

Senior career*
Years	Team	Apps	(Gls)
1984–1988	Atlético Madrid B	79	(11)
1988–1989	Racing Santander	32	(23)
1989–1993	Tenerife	137	(31)
1993–1994	Barcelona	14	(3)
1994–1996	Sevilla	26	(1)
1996–1997	Extremadura	37	(1)
1997–1999	Ourense	42	(6)
1999–2000	Gimnástica Segoviana	25	(1)
Total		392	(77)

International career
1993	Spain	3	(0)

Managerial career
- 2005: Leganés
- * Club domestic league appearances and goals

Juan Enrique 'Quique' Estebaranz López (born 6 October 1965) is a Spanish former professional footballer who played as a forward.

He made 387 appearances during his 16-year career, where he represented eight clubs. This notably included La Liga spells with Tenerife and Barcelona.

Estebaranz was a Spanish international in the early 1990s.

== Club career ==
Born in Madrid, Estebaranz started his football career with Atlético Madrid, although he only played for the reserve team. In the 1988–89 season, he made his professional debut and scored 23 goals for Racing Santander, although the Cantabrians were not ultimately promoted from the Segunda División.

Afterwards, Estebaranz signed with Tenerife in La Liga, and he scored ten goals from 33 games in his first year, his career-best in the top division. However, the Canary Islands club finished in 18th position, only avoiding relegation by victory in the playoffs; he also played a part in Tenerife's denying of two league titles to Real Madrid in the last round, for the direct benefit of Barcelona, including in the 1992–93 campaign where he scored.

Estebaranz transferred to Barcelona for 1993–94, appearing rarely as the Catalans won their fourth league title in a row. The side also reached the final of the UEFA Champions League, with the player featuring the last 20 minutes of the 4–0 loss against AC Milan.

Estebaranz signed for Sevilla after only one season with Barcelona, but appeared very little in his two-year spell in Andalusia. He subsequently became an important top-flight player with Extremadura– who had just been promoted for the first time in its history to the competition – but suffered relegation, with the player scoring one goal, against Logroñés on 6 April 1997; he closed out his career at nearly 35, after spells with Ourense in the second division and amateurs Gimnástica Segoviana.

In 2001, Estebaranz returned to his first club Atlético Madrid, being charged with running its youth teams. Four years later, he had his first head coaching experience, with another club from the Community of Madrid, lowly Leganés, being in charge for six months. The following year he re-joined the Colchoneros, after being named director of their football academy.

== International career ==
Estebaranz played on three occasions for Spain, all in 1993. His debut came on 2 June against Lithuania, and his last cap came on 22 September against Albania, both matches for the 1994 FIFA World Cup qualification stages (2–0 and 5–1 away wins).

Estebaranz's second appearance was a friendly with Chile on 8 September, as he played the second half of the 2–0 victory in Alicante.

== Honours ==
Barcelona

- La Liga: 1993–94
- UEFA Champions League runner-up: 1993–94

Individual

- Pichichi Trophy (Segunda División): 1988–89
