= Ángel Martín González =

Spanish former footballer (born 1964)

Personal information
- Full name: Ángel Martín González
- Date of birth: 28 April 1964 (age 62)
- Place of birth: Madrid, Spain
- Height: 1.73 m (5 ft 8 in)
- Position: Defensive midfielder

Youth career
- 1980–1982: Real Madrid

Senior career*
Years	Team	Apps	(Gls)
1982–1986	Castilla	114	(3)
1986	→ Osasuna (loan)	5	(0)
1986–1995	Osasuna	237	(3)
1995–1997	Rayo Vallecano	52	(0)
Total		408	(6)

International career
1981–1982	Spain U18	14	(0)
1985	Spain U21	1	(0)

Managerial career
- 1997–2003: Osasuna (assistant)
- * Club domestic league appearances and goals

Ángel Martín González (born 28 April 1964) is a Spanish former professional footballer who played mostly as a defensive midfielder.

== Playing career ==
Born in Madrid, Martín González was brought up in the Real Madrid youth system, and would subsequently represent Spain at two youth levels. Having been almost exclusively associated with the club's reserves during his spell, he was loaned to fellow La Liga side CA Osasuna in January 1986. He only appeared in five matches in his first season in Navarre but was instrumental in helping the team to avoid relegation in the last round at the expense of Valencia CF, following a 1–1 home draw against Atlético Madrid.

Martín González became an undisputed starter from the 1988–89 campaign onwards. Alongside namesake Martín Domínguez, he helped to a fourth-place finish in 1990–91 – playing all but one of the games – with the subsequent qualification for the UEFA Cup.

After a final season with Osasuna, filled with injuries and spent in the Segunda División, Martín González returned to the capital in summer 1995 with lowly Rayo Vallecano, for a further two top-flight years, being relegated in his second. He retired in June 1997, at age 33.

== Post-retirement ==
Immediately after retiring, Martín González returned to Osasuna as an assistant coach and director of football (accumulating in some seasons). He was briefly fired in October 2003 but later returned, now in only the latter capacity; he occupied that position for several years, leaving the El Sadar Stadium in August 2013.

Martín González was appointed at Real Zaragoza of the second tier on 30 July 2014, still as a sporting director. In December 2015, he left the club.

In the following years, in the same role, Martín González worked with Real Oviedo, Getafe CF and SD Huesca.

== Honours ==
Castilla

- Segunda División: 1983–84
