= Tomás Hervás =

Spanish footballer and manager

Personal information
- Full name: Tomás Alberto Hervás Girón
- Date of birth: 25 November 1970 (age 55)
- Place of birth: Ponferrada, Spain
- Height: 1.84 m (6 ft 1/2 in)
- Position: Midfielder

Team information
- Current team: Sporting Gijón (assistant)

Youth career
- Sporting Gijón

Senior career*
| Years | Team | Apps | (Gls) |
| 1987–1992 | Sporting Gijón B | 100 | (12) |
| 1991–1998 | Sporting Gijón | 161 | (13) |
| 1998–2001 | Celta | 67 | (5) |
| 2001–2003 | Sevilla | 22 | (1) |
| 2003–2005 | Las Palmas | 71 | (2) |
| 2005–2007 | Universidad Oviedo | 57 | (11) |
| 2008 | Universidad Oviedo | 16 | (10) |
| Total | | 494 | (54) |

International career
| 1991 | Spain U21 | 1 | (0) |

Managerial career
- 2014–2016: Sporting Gijón B
- 2019–2020: Espanyol (assistant)
- 2021: Alavés (assistant)
- 2022–: Sporting Gijón (assistant)
- * Club domestic league appearances and goals

Tomás Alberto Hervás Girón (born 25 November 1970), known simply as Tomás as a player, is a Spanish former professional footballer who played as a midfielder, currently assistant manager of Sporting de Gijón.

== Playing career ==
Born in Ponferrada, Region of León, Tomás graduated from Sporting de Gijón's youth academy, and made his senior debut with the reserves, playing several seasons with them in the Segunda División B. On 1 September 1991, he appeared in his first competitive match with the main squad – and in La Liga – starting a 1–0 away win against Real Valladolid.

Tomás signed for RC Celta de Vigo in summer 1998, remaining in the top division. He appeared regularly for the Galicians, and won the UEFA Intertoto Cup in 2000.

After one and a half seasons at Sevilla FC with 24 total games, Tomás joined Segunda División club UD Las Palmas in March 2003. He suffered relegation with the Canarians in his second year, and left at the end of the 2004–05 campaign.

Tomás moved to AD Universidad de Oviedo in the 2005 off-season, being promoted to the third tier at the first attempt. He was relegated in the following season and announced his retirement, but returned to the team in January 2008.

== Coaching career ==
In July 2009, Hervás was appointed Abelardo Fernández's assistant manager at Sporting de Gijón B. He occupied that role in the first team for one year, then coached the reserves in the last match of 2013–14, against Burgos CF.

On 16 June 2014, Hervás signed a permanent one-year contract at the helm of the B side. He was dismissed on 6 April 2016.

Hervás again reunited with Abelardo in December 2019, being named his assistant at RCD Espanyol.

== Personal life ==
Hervás' younger brother Aitor (born 1982) was also a footballer and a midfielder. He spent his entire career in the lower leagues, and they were teammates at Universidad Oviedo.

== Managerial statistics ==
As of 3 April 2016

| Team | Nat | From | To | Record | | | | | | | |
| Team | Nat | From | To | G | W | D | L | GF | GA | GD | Win % |
|---|---|---|---|---|---|---|---|---|---|---|---|
| Sporting Gijón B | (Spain) | 9 May 2014 | 6 April 2016 | 71 | 24 | 15 | 32 | 79 | 99 | −20 | 33.80 |
| Total | | | | 71 | 24 | 15 | 32 | 79 | 99 | −20 | 33.80 |

== Honours ==
Celta

- UEFA Intertoto Cup: 2000
