= Xavier Escaich =

Spanish footballer

Personal information
- Full name: Xavier Escaich Ferrer
- Date of birth: 6 September 1968 (age 58)
- Place of birth: Castelldefels, Spain
- Height: 1.73 m (5 ft 8 in)
- Position: Forward

Youth career
- UE Castelldefels
- CF Gavà
- CF Blanca Subur

Senior career*
Years	Team	Apps	(Gls)
1987–1988	Gimnàstic	36	(25)
1988	Hospitalet	20	(10)
1988–1993	Espanyol	118	(34)
1993–1994	Sporting Gijón	23	(8)
1994–1995	Barcelona	3	(1)
1995–1997	Albacete	41	(4)
1997–1998	Real Murcia	31	(9)
Total		272	(91)

International career
1990–1993	Catalonia	2	(1)
- * Club domestic league appearances and goals

Xavier Escaich Ferrer (born 6 September 1968) is a former Spanish footballer who played as a forward.

== Club career ==
Escaich began playing youth football for hometown club UE Castelldefels, before moving to CF Gavà and CF Blanca Subur.

In 1987, Escaich began his senior career with Gimnàstic in the Segunda División B, scoring 25 goals in 36 games. A year later, Escaich joined Hospitalet, before signing for Primera División club Espanyol. Escaich stayed at Espanyol for five seasons, joining Primera División club Sporting Gijón in 1993. In 1994, Escaich joined Barcelona as a replacement for departing forward Julio Salinas. Escaich found opportunities at Barcelona limited under manager Johan Cruyff, playing just three league games, and despite featuring for the club in pre-season the following season, Escaich was sold to Albacete following the signing of Meho Kodro. Escaich played for Albacete for two seasons, before signing for Real Murcia, retiring at the club due to an ankle injury.

== International career ==
Escaich represented Catalonia twice, scoring once.
