= Georgi Yordanov =

Bulgarian footballer

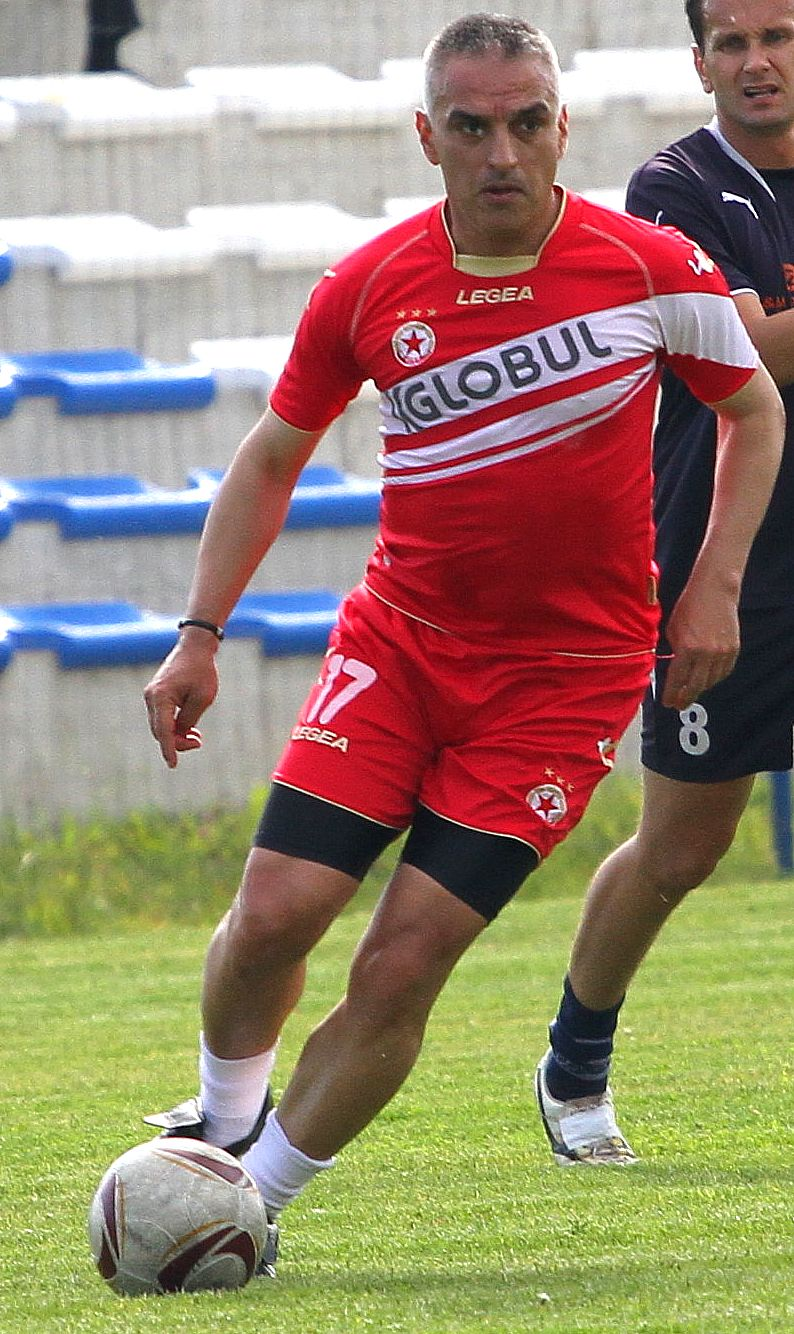
- Georgi Yordanov in 2013

Personal information
- Date of birth: 21 July 1963 (age 63)
- Place of birth: Plovdiv, Bulgaria
- Height: 1.80 m (5 ft 11 in)
- Position: Midfielder

Senior career*
Years	Team	Apps	(Gls)
1980–1981	Lokomotiv Plovdiv	30	(5)
1981–1983	Sliven	46	(7)
1985–1990	Levski Sofia	132	(39)
1990–1993	Sporting Gijón	77	(7)
1993–1994	CA Marbella	21	(1)
1994–1996	Septemvri Sofia	?	(?)
1997–1999	CSKA Sofia	48	(5)
1999–2000	Spartak Pleven	18	(1)
2000–2001	Chernomorets Burgas	10	(0)
Total		381	(65)

International career
1983–1992	Bulgaria	40	(3)
- * Club domestic league appearances and goals

Georgi Yordanov (Bulgarian: Георги Йорданов; born 21 July 1963) is a Bulgarian former professional footballer who played as a midfielder.

== Honours ==
Levski Sofia

- Bulgarian League: 1987–88
- Bulgarian Cup: 1985–86
- Cup of the Soviet Army: 1986–87, 1987–88

CSKA Sofia

- Bulgarian League: 1996–97
- Bulgarian Cup: 1996–97
