= José María Cela =

Spanish footballer and research fellow (born 1969)

Personal information
- Full name: José María Cela Ranilla
- Date of birth: 17 December 1969 (age 56)
- Place of birth: Zamora, Spain
- Height: 1.77 m (5 ft 10 in)
- Position: Forward

Youth career
- Valladolid

Senior career*
Years	Team	Apps	(Gls)
1988–1989	Medinense	31	(11)
1989–1990	Valladolid B		
1990–1992	Real Madrid B	18	(0)
1991–1992	→ Numancia (loan)	36	(4)
1992–1994	Sporting Gijón	30	(2)
1994–1995	Barcelona B	27	(7)
1995–1996	Lleida	22	(3)
1996–1997	Numancia	22	(3)
1997–1999	RKC Waalwijk		

International career
1990	Spain U19	3	(0)
1990	Spain U20	1	(0)
- * Club domestic league appearances and goals

José María Cela Ranilla (born 17 December 1969) is a Spanish retired footballer who played as a forward, and current research fellow at Rovira i Virgili University.

== Club career ==
Born in Zamora, Castile and León, Cela started his football career at Real Valladolid's youth team and was eventually noticed by Real Madrid who signed him for their reserve team. He made his La Liga debut with Sporting Gijón.

After two seasons in Gijón, he found himself jumping from club to club each season, including a spell in FC Barcelona's reserve team, until he eventually settled at Dutch side RKC Waalwijk where he ended his career in 1999 after two seasons.

== Personal life ==
Once Cela retired from football, he completely disconnected himself from the industry and went on to work in the field of educational research at Catalan university Rovira i Virgili where he has participated in several projects of both national and international research.
