= Iván Iglesias =

Spanish footballer

Personal information
- Full name: Iván Iglesias Corteguera
- Date of birth: 16 December 1971 (age 54)
- Place of birth: Gijón, Spain
- Height: 1.76 m (5 ft 9 in)
- Position: Midfielder

Youth career
- 1980–1990: Sporting Gijón

Senior career*
Years	Team	Apps	(Gls)
1990–1992	Sporting Gijón B	55	(4)
1991–1993	Sporting Gijón	43	(4)
1993–1996	Barcelona	49	(5)
1995–1996	→ Sporting Gijón (loan)	18	(0)
1996–2000	Oviedo	94	(11)
2000–2002	Rayo Vallecano	26	(1)
2002–2003	Cartagonova	20	(0)
2003–2004	Oviedo ACF		
Total		305	(25)

International career
1991	Spain U21	1	(0)
2000	Asturias	1	(0)
- * Club domestic league appearances and goals

Iván Iglesias Corteguera (born 16 December 1971) is a Spanish former professional footballer who played as a midfielder.

== Club career ==
Born in Gijón, Asturias, Iglesias started playing professionally with local Sporting de Gijón. After just two seasons – and only appearing regularly in 1992–93 – he was signed by La Liga club FC Barcelona in summer 1993, after agreeing to a five-year contract.

Never an undisputed starter at the Camp Nou, Iglesias did make 71 competitive appearances in his two-year spell. On 8 January 1994, he closed the scoring for Johan Cruyff's side against Real Madrid in a 5–0 home rout; Barcelona eventually clinched the league title.

Shortly after suffering an anterior cruciate ligament injury, Iglesias returned to Sporting for the 1995–96 campaign (on loan), after which he switched to neighbouring Real Oviedo where he would stay for four years, always in the top flight. He retired in June 2002 aged 30 while at Rayo Vallecano in the same league, totalling 230 games and 21 goals over 11 seasons.

Iglesias later opened a football school with his former Sporting teammate Juanele.

== Honours ==
Barcelona

- La Liga: 1993–94
- Supercopa de España: 1994
- UEFA Champions League runner-up: 1993–94
