= Emilio Isierte =

Spanish footballer

Personal information
- Full name: Emili Josep Isierte Aguilar
- Date of birth: 13 November 1963 (age 62)
- Place of birth: Amposta, Spain
- Height: 1.84 m (6 ft 1/2 in)
- Position: Goalkeeper

Youth career
- Rapitenca
- 1980–1982: Castellón

Senior career*
| Years | Team | Apps | (Gls) |
| 1982–1991 | Castellón | 113 | (0) |
| 1987–1988 | → Burriana (loan) | | |
| 1991–1994 | Sporting Gijón | 58 | (0) |
| 1992–1993 | → Español (loan) | 33 | (0) |
| 1994–1998 | Lleida | 104 | (0) |
| 1998–2000 | Castellón | 47 | (0) |
| Total | | 355 | (0) |

International career
| 1993 | Catalonia | 1 | (0) |
- * Club domestic league appearances and goals

Emili Josep Isierte Aguilar (born 13 November 1963) is a Spanish former professional footballer who played as a goalkeeper.

== Playing career ==
Born in Amposta, Province of Tarragona, Catalonia, Isierte started and finished his 15-year senior career with CD Castellón. He helped them to achieve La Liga promotion in the 1988–89 season, as Segunda División champions.

Isierte appeared in all 38 games in 1991–92's top flight for Sporting de Gijón, who had lost longtime incumbent Juan Carlos Ablanedo to an anterior cruciate ligament injury; that campaign, he went seven matches without conceding a goal, a club record that stood for several years. In the UEFA Cup, he played a key role in the first round win against FK Partizan on penalties, with the second leg taking place in Istanbul due to the Yugoslav Wars.

Ablanedo subsequently returned to fitness, and Isierte was sent to fellow top-tier side RCD Español on loan. Having made 70 total appearances for Sporting, he then spent four seasons in the second division with UE Lleida.

== Coaching career ==
After retiring, Isierte worked under José Luis Oltra at several teams. He also had two spells as goalkeeper coach of Castellón.

== Personal life ==
Isierte's son, David, was also a footballer. A defender, he too was brought up at Castellón.

== Honours ==
Castellón

- Segunda División: 1988–89
