= Pablo Díaz (footballer, born 1971) =

Footballer (born 1971)

Personal information
- Full name: Pablo Javier Díaz Stalla
- Date of birth: 5 August 1971 (age 55)
- Place of birth: Buenos Aires, Argentina
- Height: 1.78 m (5 ft 10 in)
- Position: Right-back

Youth career
- 1988–1990: Sporting Gijón

Senior career*
Years	Team	Apps	(Gls)
1990	Sporting Gijón B	7	(0)
1990–1998	Sporting Gijón	214	(4)
1998–2004	Zaragoza	122	(2)
Total		343	(6)

International career
1991	Spain U19	3	(0)
1991–1993	Spain U21	4	(0)
1991	Spain U23	2	(0)
- * Club domestic league appearances and goals

Pablo Javier Díaz Stalla (born 5 August 1971) is a Spanish former professional footballer who played as a right-back.

He appeared for Sporting de Gijón and Zaragoza in a 14-year senior career. Born in Argentina, he represented Spain internationally at youth levels.

== Club career ==
Born in Buenos Aires, Argentina to a Spanish father who moved to the country in search of work, and an Argentine mother, Díaz played professionally in Spain, amassing La Liga totals of 330 games and six goals over the course of 13 seasons for Sporting de Gijón and Real Zaragoza. He made his debut in the competition with the former on 23 September 1990, coming on as a late substitute in a 3–1 home win against Athletic Bilbao, and scored his first league goal in the following campaign, against the same rivals and also at the El Molinón (3–2 victory).

In the summer of 1998, after the Asturians' top-flight relegation, Díaz signed for Zaragoza, remaining with the club until his retirement at the age of 32.

== Honours ==
Zaragoza

- Copa del Rey: 2000–01, 2003–04
