= Juanele =

Spanish footballer (born 1971)

Personal information
- Full name: Juan Castaño Quirós
- Date of birth: 10 April 1971 (age 55)
- Place of birth: Gijón, Spain
- Height: 1.75 m (5 ft 9 in)
- Position: Forward

Youth career
- Veriña

Senior career*
Years	Team	Apps	(Gls)
1989–1991	Sporting Gijón B	65	(14)
1991–1994	Sporting Gijón	91	(18)
1994–1999	Tenerife	151	(27)
1999–2004	Zaragoza	130	(19)
2004–2005	Terrassa	16	(1)
2005–2006	Avilés	2	(0)
2006–2007	Camocha		
2007	Roces	11	(0)
Total		466	(79)

International career
1992	Spain U23	2	(0)
1994	Spain	5	(2)
2000–2001	Asturias	2	(3)
- * Club domestic league appearances and goals

Juan Castaño Quirós (born 10 April 1971), known as Juanele, is a Spanish former professional footballer who played as a forward.

He achieved La Liga totals of 346 games and 61 goals in representation of Sporting de Gijón, Tenerife and Zaragoza, and won the Copa del Rey twice with the last of those clubs.

Juanele earned five caps for Spain, all in 1994, and appeared at the World Cup that year.

== Club career ==
Born in Gijón, Asturias, Juanele started playing professionally for hometown club Sporting de Gijón, making his first-team – and La Liga – debut at the age of 20 and finishing his first season with three goals in 24 games. He became an undisputed starter the following years.

In June 1994, Juanele signed a five-year contract with CD Tenerife, being an essential attacking unit as the Canary Islands side reached the semi-finals in the 1996–97 UEFA Cup, scoring twice against SS Lazio (5–3 home win, 5–4 on aggregate) and at Feyenoord (4–2 victory, 4–2 on aggregate). In addition, he netted 15 league goals in 60 matches as they achieved back-to-back top-ten finishes, which included the fifth place in 1996 that led to the European exploits.

Juanele joined Real Zaragoza after Tenerife's 1999 relegation, helping the Aragonese to two Copa del Rey trophies in the early 2000s, even though he was already a fringe player in the second conquest. He left in 2004 to Terrassa FC of the Segunda División, joining lowly Real Avilés Industrial CF at the end of the season.

In 2006–07, Juanele had brief amateur stints with SD Atlético Camocha and TSK Roces, both in the Asturian regional leagues, retiring from football aged 36.

== International career ==
Juanele earned five caps for the Spain national team in 1994, scoring twice (in his debut on 19 January, a 2–2 home draw against Portugal, and his last match five months later, a 2–0 away defeat of Canada). He was subsequently named in the 1994 FIFA World Cup squad, but did not play in the tournament.

Juanele also appeared twice for the Asturias autonomous team. His debut came in a friendly with Macedonia on 23 December 2000, in which he scored the only goal of their first game in 64 years.

=== International goals ===
Scores and results list Spain's goal tally first, score column indicates score after each Juanele goal.

List of international goals scored by Juanele
No.	Date	Venue	Opponent	Score	Result	Competition
1	19 January 1994	Balaídos, Vigo, Spain	Portugal	2–1	2–2	Friendly
2	10 June 1994	Claude Robillard, Montreal, Canada	Canada	2–0	2–0	Friendly

== Personal life ==
After some episodes of depression and a battle to overcome an addiction to prescription drugs, Juanele was admitted in early 2008 to a Gijón hospital due to an excessive intake. He later recovered, eventually opening a football school with former Sporting teammate Iván Iglesias.

On 13 June 2015, Juanele was sentenced to five months in prison for hitting his former partner with a baseball bat, which was to be complemented with an obligatory medical treatment. In 2011, he had already been incarcerated for violation of a restraining order.

Juanele was again admitted to hospital in July 2020, due to food poisoning. Shortly after leaving prison having seen out his sentence, he said in an interview to El Comercio that he had been forced to retire due to his bipolar disorder.

== Honours ==
Zaragoza

- Copa del Rey: 2000–01, 2003–04
