= Emilio Gutiérrez (footballer) =

Spanish footballer

Personal information
- Full name: Emilio José Gutiérrez González
- Date of birth: 4 January 1971 (age 55)
- Place of birth: Avilés, Spain
- Height: 1.77 m (5 ft 9 1/2 in)
- Position: Midfielder

Youth career
- Avilés
- 1987–1989: Barcelona

Senior career*
Years	Team	Apps	(Gls)
1987	Avilés	3	(0)
1989–1991	Barcelona B	69	(12)
1991–1992	Barcelona	0	(0)
1991–1992	→ Sporting Gijón (loan)	10	(1)
1992–1995	Sporting Gijón	47	(3)
1995	Albacete	1	(0)
1995–1996	Marbella	13	(2)
1996	Beira-Mar		
1996–1997	Málaga	16	(0)
1997–2000	Cultural Leonesa	27	(0)
2000	Sabadell	10	(0)
2000	Terrassa	4	(1)
2000–2001	Langreo	22	(1)
Total		222	(20)

International career
1987	Spain U16	5	(0)
1988	Spain U18	3	(2)
1989	Spain U19	2	(0)
1989–1990	Spain U20	5	(0)
1991	Spain U21	4	(0)
1991	Spain U23	4	(1)
- * Club domestic league appearances and goals

Emilio José Gutiérrez González (born 4 January 1971 in Avilés, Asturias), sometimes known as just Emilio, is a Spanish retired footballer who played as a midfielder.
