= Juan Ramón López Muñiz =

Spanish footballer and manager (born 1968)

Juan Muñiz
Personal information
- Full name: Juan Ramón López Muñiz
- Date of birth: 2 November 1968 (age 57)
- Place of birth: Gijón, Spain
- Height: 1.85 m (6 ft 1 in)
- Position: Centre-back

Youth career
- Sporting Gijón

Senior career*
Years	Team	Apps	(Gls)
1986–1991	Sporting Gijón B	84	(7)
1988–1989	→ Izarra (loan)		
1991–1996	Sporting Gijón	150	(6)
1996–1999	Rayo Vallecano	107	(4)
1999–2002	Numancia	75	(0)
Total		416	(17)

International career
2000–2002	Asturias	1	(0)

Managerial career
- 2003–2004: Málaga (assistant)
- 2006: Marbella
- 2006–2008: Málaga
- 2008–2009: Racing Santander
- 2009–2010: Málaga
- 2010–2014: Dnipro (assistant)
- 2015–2016: Alcorcón
- 2016–2018: Levante
- 2018–2019: Málaga
- 2020: Alavés
- * Club domestic league appearances and goals

Juan Ramón López Muñiz (born 2 November 1968) is a Spanish former professional footballer who played as a central defender. He also worked as a manager.

== Playing career ==
Muñiz was born in Gijón, Asturias. During his playing days, he represented hometown club Sporting de Gijón (making his first-team debut in the 1991–92 season, at already 23), Rayo Vallecano – scoring four goals from 40 appearances during 1998–99, which granted the Madrid side La Liga promotion via the playoffs even though they finished fifth – and Numancia.

Muñiz retired at the end of the 2001–02 campaign at the age of 33, as the team from Soria could only finish in 17th position in the Segunda División. In 11 years as a professional, he appeared in 332 games and scored ten times (234 matches and six goals in the top flight).

== Coaching career ==
Muñiz started as an assistant manager at Málaga in 2003, under Juande Ramos. His first head coach experience arrived in early 2006 with lowly Marbella, and he subsequently returned to Málaga as the main manager for two seasons, achieving a runner-up place in 2008 and thus promoting the Andalusians to the top tier after a two-year hiatus.

In July 2008, Muñiz switched to Racing de Santander in the same league. At the season's end, he was released from contract and promptly returned to Málaga, replacing Antonio Tapia who took over relegated neighbours Real Betis.

In late June 2010, having led Málaga to the 17th position, last above the relegation zone, Muñiz was sacked. Shortly after, he rejoined Ramos at Dnipro Dnipropetrovsk.

Muñiz was appointed Alcorcón manager on 8 June 2015, after four years in Ukraine. Roughly one year later, he signed with fellow division two club Levante, achieving promotion at the first attempt as champions.

On 20 June 2018, Muñiz returned to Málaga for a third spell by agreeing to a two-year contract. He was dismissed the following 14 April, following a 1–2 home loss against Extremadura.

On 5 July 2020, after more than a year without a club, Muñiz took charge of Alavés in the top division until the end of the campaign.

== Managerial statistics ==
As of 19 July 2020

Managerial record by team and tenure
Team	Nat	From	To	Record								Ref
Team	Nat	From	To	G	W	D	L	GF	GA	GD	Win %	Ref
Marbella	(Spain)	7 April 2006	31 October 2006	18	8	7	3	17	14	+3	44.44	
Málaga	(Spain)	31 October 2006	30 June 2008	81	33	25	23	102	88	+14	40.74	
Racing Santander	(Spain)	1 July 2008	20 June 2009	48	16	13	19	62	59	+3	33.33	
Málaga	(Spain)	25 June 2009	16 June 2010	42	8	18	16	46	55	−9	19.05	
Alcorcón	(Spain)	8 June 2015	14 June 2016	43	18	10	15	48	45	+3	41.86	
Levante	(Spain)	14 June 2016	4 March 2018	74	30	23	21	85	79	+6	40.54	
Málaga	(Spain)	20 June 2018	14 April 2019	35	15	10	10	35	28	+7	42.86	
Alavés	(Spain)	5 July 2020	21 July 2020	4	1	1	2	2	8	−6	25.00	
Career total				345	129	107	109	397	376	+21	37.39	—

== Honours ==
Levante

- Segunda División: 2016–17

Individual

- Miguel Muñoz Trophy (Segunda División): 2016–17
