= Abelardo Fernández =

Spanish footballer

Abelardo
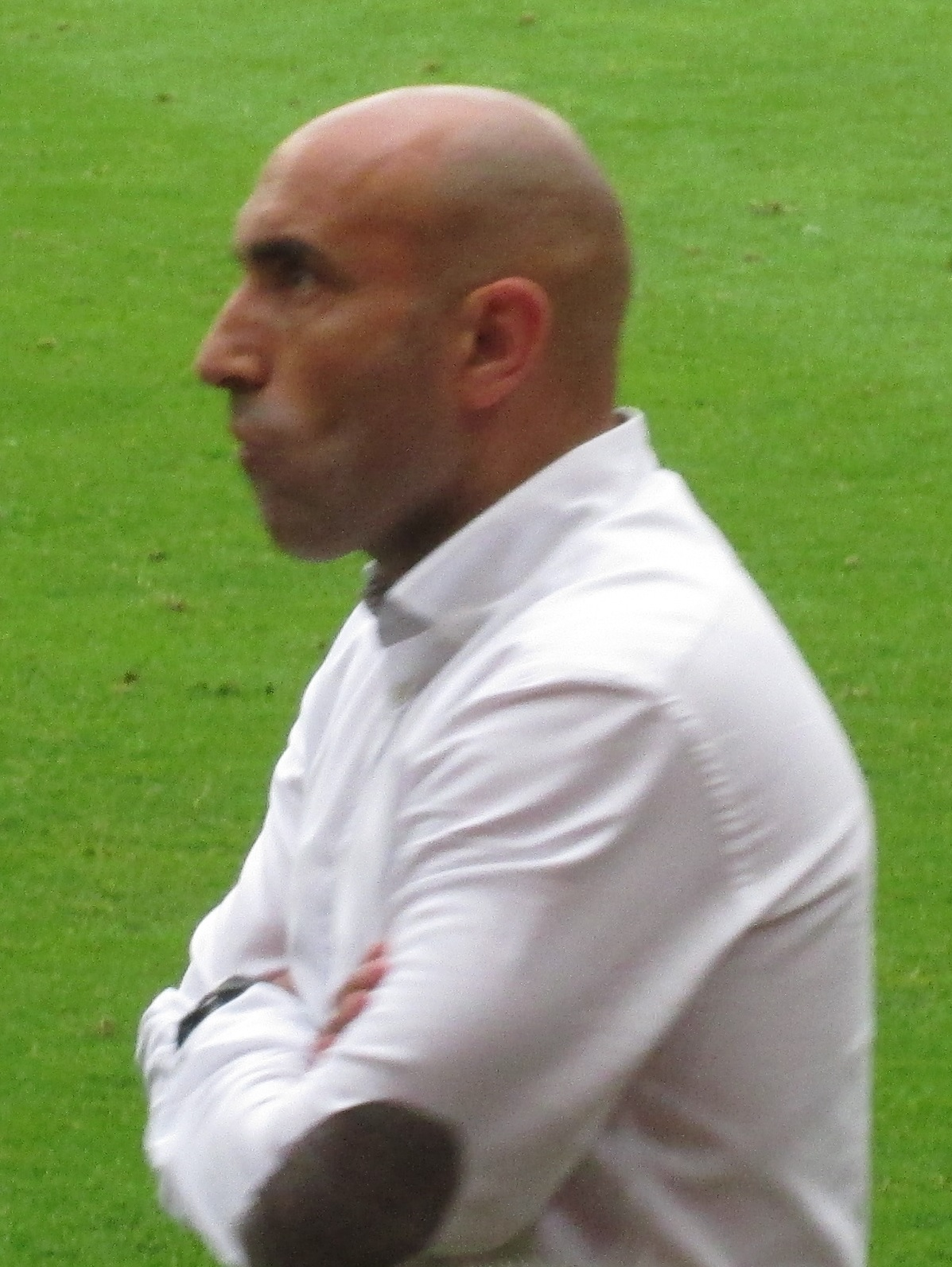
- Abelardo with Sporting Gijón in 2014

Personal information
- Full name: Abelardo Fernández Antuña
- Date of birth: 19 April 1970 (age 56)
- Place of birth: Gijón, Spain
- Height: 1.80 m (5 ft 11 in)
- Position: Centre-back

Youth career
- 1985–1986: La Braña
- 1986–1988: Estudiantes Somió
- 1988–1989: Sporting Gijón

Senior career*
Years	Team	Apps	(Gls)
1989	Sporting Gijón B	4	(2)
1989–1994	Sporting Gijón	179	(13)
1994–2002	Barcelona	178	(11)
2002–2003	Alavés	28	(0)
Total		389	(26)

International career
1990	Spain U20	1	(0)
1990–1991	Spain U21	6	(1)
1991–1992	Spain U23	12	(5)
1991–2001	Spain	54	(3)
2002	Asturias	1	(1)

Managerial career
- 2008–2010: Sporting Gijón B
- 2010–2011: Candás
- 2011–2012: Tuilla
- 2012–2014: Sporting Gijón B
- 2014–2017: Sporting Gijón
- 2017–2019: Alavés
- 2019–2020: Espanyol
- 2021: Alavés
- 2022–2023: Sporting Gijón
- 2024: Cartagena
Medal record
Men's Football
Representing Spain
Olympic Games
Gold medal – first place	1992 Barcelona	Team competition
- * Club domestic league appearances and goals

Abelardo Fernández Antuña (Spanish pronunciation: [aβeˈlaɾðo feɾˈnandeθ anˈtuɲa]; born 19 April 1970), known simply as Abelardo as a player, is a Spanish former footballer who played as a central defender, currently a manager.

A player with good heading and marking ability, he was also known for a distinctive bald head, a style which he adopted from a relatively young age. During his career he was almost exclusively associated with Sporting de Gijón and Barcelona, having amassed La Liga totals of 385 matches and 24 goals over 14 seasons, and also managed the former club for three years.

Having won more than 50 caps for Spain in one decade, Abelardo represented the nation in two World Cups and as many European Championships.

== Club career ==
Born in Gijón, Asturias, Abelardo started his professional career with local Sporting de Gijón, with which he made his La Liga debut. Signing for FC Barcelona ahead of the 1994–95 season in a 275 million pesetas deal, he was always an important first-team element, helping the Catalans to two leagues, Copa del Rey and Supercopa de España, adding another two European trophies. However, he was greatly hampered by injuries in his final years at the Camp Nou.

Aged 32, Abelardo joined Deportivo Alavés, initially signing a two-year deal but retiring after just one season due to a recurrent knee injury that had already bothered him at Barcelona.

== International career ==
Abelardo made his debut for the Spain national team on 4 September 1991, in a friendly against Uruguay in Oviedo. He went on to appear in a further 53 games and score three goals, being a participant at the 1994 and 1998 FIFA World Cups and UEFA Euro 1996 and 2000.

Abelardo was also an essential member of the squad that won the gold medal at the 1992 Summer Olympics in Barcelona, netting in both the semi-finals (2–0, Ghana) and the final (3–2 over Poland). On 28 December 2002, he played for the Asturias regional team in a friendly against Honduras in Avilés, and scored the opening goal of a 5–3 win.

=== International goals ===
#	Date	Venue	Opponent	Score	Result	Competition
1.	12 October 1991	Estadio Benito Villamarín, Seville, Spain	France	1–2	1–2	UEFA Euro 1992 qualifying
2.	13 November 1991	Ramón Sánchez-Pizjuán Stadium, Seville, Spain	Czechoslovakia	1–0	2–1	UEFA Euro 1992 qualifying
3.	29 March 2000	Estadi de Montjuïc, Barcelona, Spain	Italy	2–0	2–0	Friendly

== Coaching career ==
Subsequently, Fernández took up coaching, starting with his first club's B side in 2008. Midway through his second year he was fired, with the team managing to retain their Segunda División B status nonetheless. In May 2010, he moved to neighbouring amateurs Candás CF.

Fernández signed for CD Tuilla for the 2011–12 campaign – also in Asturias and the Tercera División– winning the Copa Federación de España (Asturias tournament). On 10 February 2012, Sporting Gijón hired him as an assistant coach after Iñaki Tejada was appointed following the departure of Manuel Preciado.

Fernández returned to head coach duties and Sporting B for 2012–13. Late into the following season, he led them to a 4–1 away win over neighbouring Real Oviedo and, one week later, replaced the sacked José Ramón Sandoval at the helm of the main squad. Amidst severe financial problems, he led them to promotion back to the top flight in his first full season, and quit his post in January 2017 due to irreconcilable differences.

On 1 December 2017, Fernández was hired as manager of Alavés, which were placed in the last position in the top division at the date of his arrival. His first game in charge took place three days later, and he led the visitors to a 3–2 away win over Girona FC after they trailed 2–0 with 20 minutes left. In 2018–19, his team started well and were in contention for a Champions League place before fading in the second half to finish 11th, and he resigned at its conclusion.

Fernández returned to the city of Barcelona on 27 December 2019, becoming RCD Espanyol's third coach of the campaign as the side was in last place. Six months later, he was dismissed as the side were eight points from safety with seven games remaining.

On 12 January 2021, Fernández returned to Alavés in place of the sacked Pablo Machín. He went back to Sporting in May 2022, being relieved of his duties the following 15 January.

On 6 June 2024, after more than a year of inactivity, Abelardo was named as the new manager of Segunda División side FC Cartagena on a contract for the upcoming season. He was dismissed after six matches.

== Personal life ==
Abelardo first met Luis Enrique at the age of 6, and the pair played together for the same junior team, Sporting, Barcelona and Spain.

== Managerial statistics ==
As of match played 22 September 2024

Managerial record by team and tenure
Team	Nat	From	To	Record								Ref
Team	Nat	From	To	G	W	D	L	GF	GA	GD	Win %	Ref
Sporting Gijón B	(Spain)	10 July 2008	4 January 2010	69	23	10	36	81	101	−20	33.33	
Candás	(Spain)	19 May 2010	14 June 2011	47	24	15	8	76	49	+27	51.06	
Tuilla	(Spain)	14 June 2011	10 February 2012	32	16	6	10	45	34	+11	50.00	
Sporting Gijón B	(Spain)	22 May 2012	4 May 2014	86	29	28	29	111	108	+3	33.72	
Sporting Gijón	(Spain)	4 May 2014	17 January 2017	110	37	34	39	130	144	−14	33.64	
Alavés	(Spain)	1 December 2017	20 May 2019	69	29	14	26	83	86	−3	42.03	
Espanyol	(Spain)	27 December 2019	27 June 2020	17	5	5	7	19	24	−5	29.41	
Alavés	(Spain)	12 January 2021	5 April 2021	12	1	2	9	8	29	−21	8.33	
Sporting Gijón	(Spain)	3 May 2022	15 January 2023	30	10	12	8	34	30	+4	33.33	
Cartagena	(Spain)	6 June 2024	25 September 2024	6	1	0	5	5	10	−5	16.67	
Career total				478	175	126	177	592	615	−23	36.61	—

== Honours ==
=== Player ===
Barcelona

- La Liga: 1997–98, 1998–99
- Copa del Rey: 1996–97, 1997–98
- Supercopa de España: 1994, 1996
- UEFA Cup Winners' Cup: 1996–97
- UEFA Super Cup: 1997

Spain U23

- Summer Olympic Games: 1992

=== Manager ===
Candás

- Copa Federación de España (Asturias tournament): 2010

Tuilla

- Copa Federación de España (Asturias tournament): 2011
