= List of FC Barcelona managers =

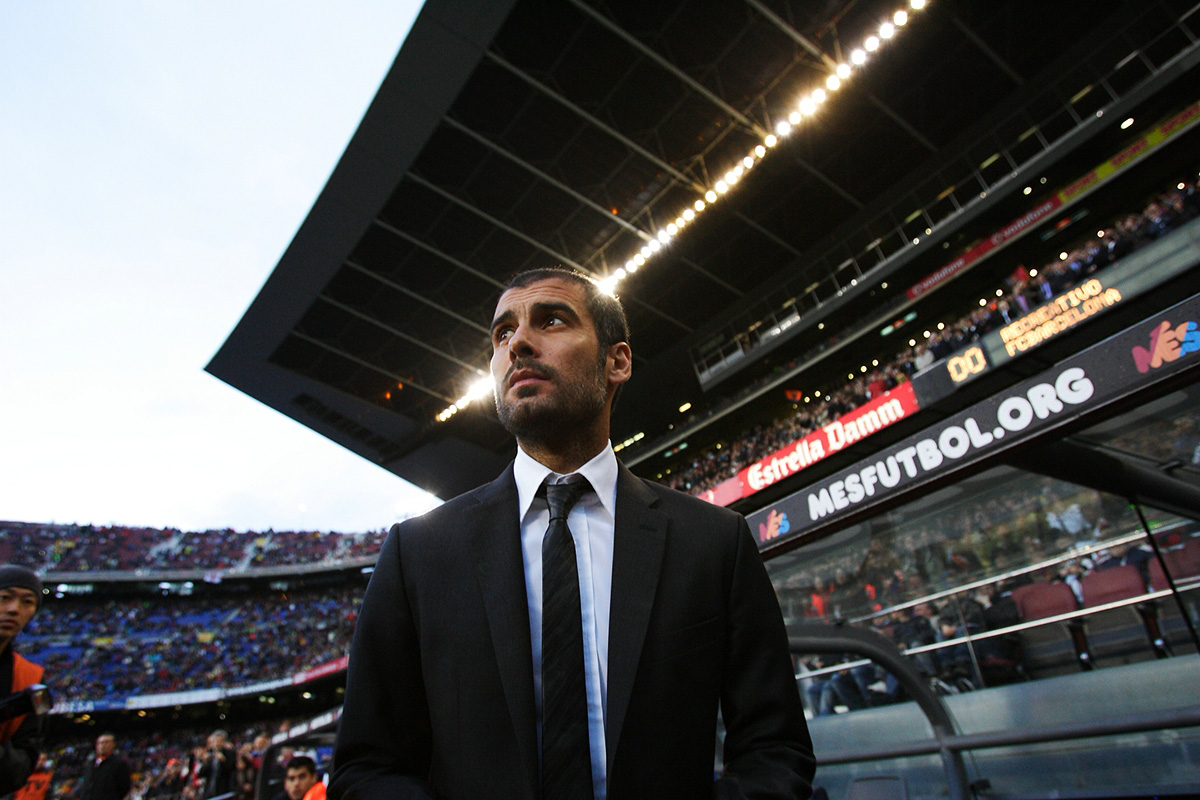
Pep Guardiola is the most successful Barcelona manager (14 titles in 4 seasons).

Futbol Club Barcelona is a professional association football club based in Barcelona, Catalonia, Spain. The first full-time manager of Barcelona was Miles Barron.

In 2009, Guardiola's first full year in charge, Barcelona became the first Spanish club to win the continental treble of La Liga, the Copa del Rey and the Champions League. Later that year, they became the first football team to achieve the sextuple, comprising the aforementioned treble, the Supercopa de España, the UEFA Super Cup and the FIFA Club World Cup.

The second most successful Barcelona manager in terms of trophies won is Johan Cruyff, who won four La Liga titles, one Copa del Rey, three Supercopa de España, one UEFA Cup Winners' Cup, one European Cup and one European Super Cup in his 8-year reign as manager.

== List of managers ==
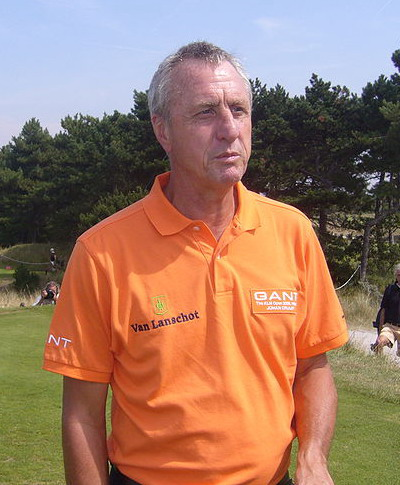
Johan Cruyff won La Liga four consecutive times as manager.

During the first 29 years of Barcelona's existence, from 1899 to 1928, Spain did not have a just football league. So Barcelona competed in the championship of the Catalonia region, the winners of which qualified for the Copa del Rey along with the other regional champions.

In February 1929, Spain's first national football league was formed, with Barcelona among the founding members. The club also competed in the Campionat de Catalunya (Catalan Championship) until it was abandoned in 1940. The Copa del Rey continued alongside La Liga. Clubs continued to qualify for it based on their placings in the regional championships until 1940, when it became open to all teams in the top two divisions of La Liga and selected other teams.

Name	From	To	Honours	No. of honours	Refs
Billy Lambe	1 January 1912	31 August 1912	1 Copa del Rey; 1 Pyrenees Cup	2	
Miles Barron	1 September 1912	29 December 1912		0	
Jack Alderson	30 December 1912	15 January 1913		0	
Jack Greenwell	15 January 1913	31 August 1923	3 Copa del Rey; 5 Campionat de Catalunya; 1 Pyrenees Cup	9	
Jesza Poszony	1 September 1923	11 October 1923		0	
Alf Spouncer	12 October 1923	20 June 1924	1 Campionat de Catalunya	1	
Ralph Kirby	December 1924	February 1926	1 Copa del Rey; 1 Campionat de Catalunya	2	
Richard Kohn	February 1926	December 1926	1 Campionat de Catalunya; 1 Copa del Rey	2	
Romà Forns	December 1926	March 1929	1 Campionat de Catalunya; 1 Copa del Rey	2	
James Bellamy	March 1929	July 1931	1 La Liga; 2 Campionat de Catalunya	3	
Jack Greenwell	July 1931	July 1933	1 Campionat de Catalunya	1	
Richard Kohn	July 1933	February 1934		0	
Ramón Zabalo	February 1934	July 1934		0	
Franz Platko	July 1934	July 1935	1 Campionat de Catalunya	1	
Patrick O'Connell	July 1935	March 1940	2 Campionat de Catalunya	2	
Josep Planas	March 1940	July 1941		0	
Ramón Guzmán	July 1941	January 1942		0	
Joan Josep Nogués	January 1942	June 1944	1 Copa del Rey	1	
Josep Samitier	June 1944	July 1947	1 La Liga; 1 Copa Eva Duarte	2	
Enrique Fernández	July 1947	May 1950	2 La Liga; 1 Copa Eva Duarte; 1 Latin Cup	4	
Ramón Llorens	May 1950	June 1950			
Ferdinand Daučík	June 1950	July 1954	2 La Liga; 3 Copa del Rey; 2 Copa Eva Duarte; 1 Latin Cup	8	
Sandro Puppo	July 1954	June 1955		0	
Franz Platko	June 1955	June 1956		0	
Domingo Balmanya	June 1956	April 1958	1 Copa del Rey; 1 Small Club World Cup	2	
Helenio Herrera	April 1958	May 1960	2 La Liga; 1 Copa del Rey; 1 Fairs Cup	4	
Enric Rabassa	May 1960	June 1960	1 Fairs Cup	1	
Ljubiša Broćić	June 1960	January 1961		0	
Enrique Orizaola	January 1961	June 1961		0	
Luis Miró	June 1961	November 1961		0	
Ladislao Kubala	November 1961	January 1963		0	
Josep Gonzalvo	January 1963	July 1963	1 Copa del Rey	1	
César Rodríguez	July 1963	October 1964		0	
Vicente Sasot	October 1964	June 1965		0	
Roque Olsen	June 1965	June 1967	1 Fairs Cup	1	
Salvador Artigas	June 1967	October 1969	1 Copa del Rey	1	
Josep Seguer	October 1969	December 1969		0	
Vic Buckingham	December 1969	July 1971	1 Copa del Rey	1	
Rinus Michels	July 1971	May 1975	1 La Liga	1	
Hennes Weisweiler	May 1975	April 1976		0	
Laureano Ruiz	April 1976	May 1976		0	
Rinus Michels	May 1976	May 1978	1 Copa del Rey	1	
Lucien Muller	May 1978	April 1979		0	
Joaquim Rifé	April 1979	March 1980	1 Cup Winners' Cup	1	
Helenio Herrera	March 1980	May 1980		0	
Ladislao Kubala	May 1980	November 1980		0	
Helenio Herrera	November 1980	June 1981	1 Copa del Rey	1	
Udo Lattek	June 1981	March 1983	1 Cup Winners' Cup	1	
José Luis Romero	March 1983	March 1983		0	
César Luis Menotti	March 1983	June 1984	1 Copa del Rey; 1 Copa de la Liga; 1 Supercopa de España	3	
Terry Venables	June 1984	September 1987	1 La Liga; 1 Copa de la Liga	2	
Luis Aragonés	September 1987	May 1988	1 Copa del Rey	1	
Carles Rexach	June 1988	June 1988		0	
Johan Cruyff	May 1988	May 1996	4 La Liga; 1 Copa del Rey; 3 Supercopa de España; 1 European Cup; 1 Cup Winners' Cup; 1 European Super Cup	11	
Carles Rexach	May 1996	June 1996		0	
Bobby Robson	July 1996	June 1997	1 Copa del Rey; 1 Supercopa de España; 1 Cup Winners' Cup	3	
Louis van Gaal	June 1997	May 2000	2 La Liga; 1 Copa del Rey; 1 UEFA Super Cup	4	
Lorenzo Serra Ferrer	May 2000	April 2001		0	
Carles Rexach	April 2001	May 2002		0	
Louis van Gaal	May 2002	January 2003		0	
Antonio de la Cruz	January 2003	February 2003		0	
Radomir Antić	February 2003	June 2003		0	
Frank Rijkaard	June 2003	June 2008	2 La Liga; 2 Supercopa de España; 1 UEFA Champions League	5	
Pep Guardiola	June 2008	June 2012	3 La Liga; 2 Copa del Rey; 3 Supercopa de España; 2 UEFA Champions League; 2 UEFA Super Cup; 2 FIFA Club World Cup	14	
Tito Vilanova	July 2012	July 2013	1 La Liga	1	
Gerardo Martino	July 2013	May 2014	1 Supercopa de España	1	
Luis Enrique	May 2014	May 2017	2 La Liga; 3 Copa del Rey; 1 Supercopa de España; 1 UEFA Champions League; 1 UEFA Super Cup; 1 FIFA Club World Cup	9	
Ernesto Valverde	May 2017	January 2020	2 La Liga; 1 Copa del Rey; 1 Supercopa de España	4	
Quique Setién	January 2020	August 2020		0	
Ronald Koeman	August 2020	October 2021	1 Copa del Rey	1	
Sergi Barjuán	October 2021	November 2021		0	
Xavi	November 2021	May 2024	1 La Liga; 1 Supercopa de España	2	
Hansi Flick	May 2024		2 La Liga; 1 Copa del Rey; 2 Supercopa de España	5	
