= Pep Guardiola =

Catalan football manager and player from Spain (born 1971)

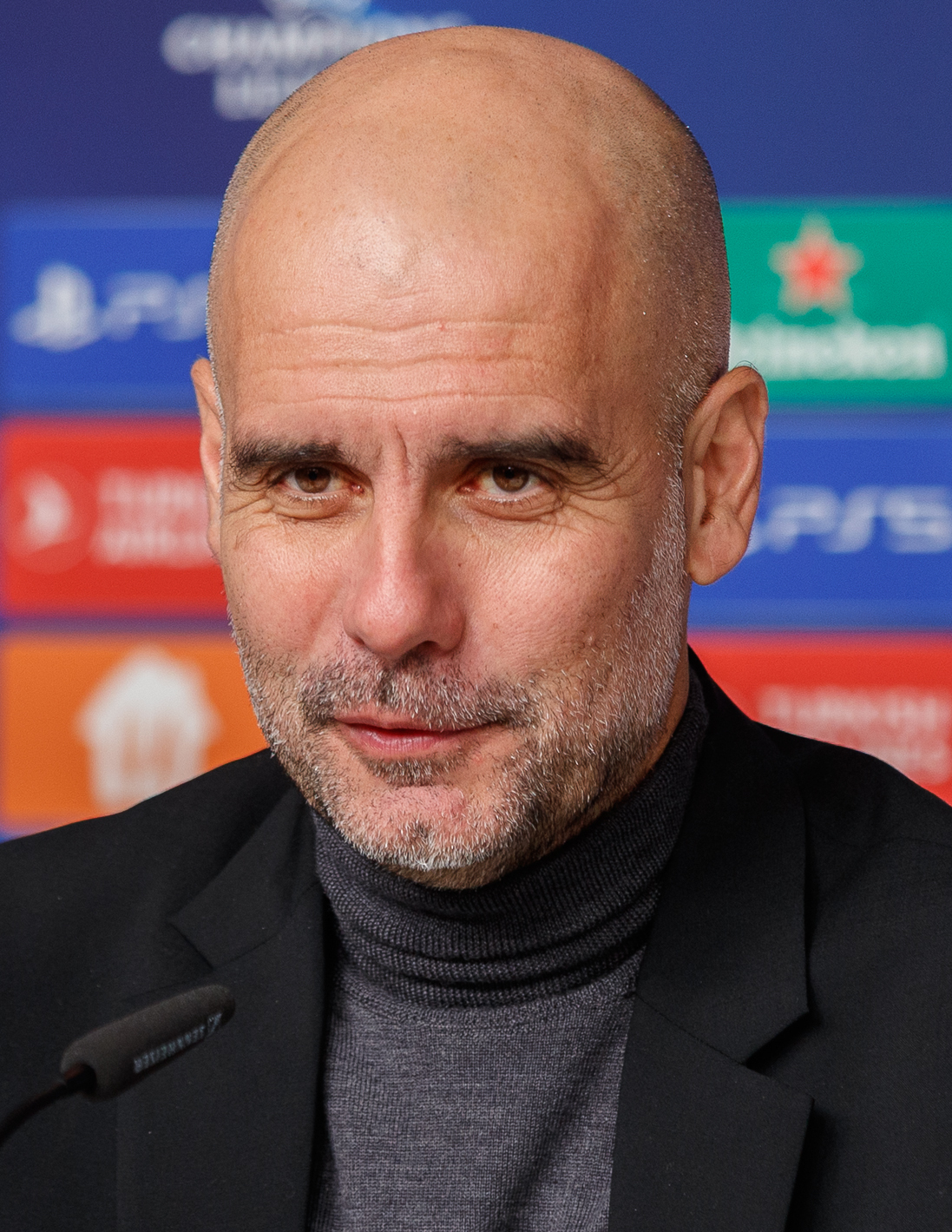
- Guardiola in 2023

Personal information
- Full name: Josep Guardiola Sala
- Date of birth: 18 January 1971 (age 55)
- Place of birth: Santpedor, Catalonia, Spain
- Height: 1.80 m (5 ft 11 in)
- Position: Defensive midfielder

Youth career
- 1981–1984: Gimnàstic Manresa
- 1984–1990: Barcelona

Senior career*
Years	Team	Apps	(Gls)
1988–1989	Barcelona C	8	(1)
1990–1992	Barcelona B	53	(5)
1990–2001	Barcelona	263	(6)
2001–2002	Brescia	11	(2)
2002–2003	Roma	4	(0)
2003	Brescia	13	(1)
2003–2005	Al-Ahli	36	(5)
2005–2006	Dorados	10	(1)
Total		398	(21)

International career
1991	Spain U21	2	(0)
1991–1992	Spain U23	12	(2)
1992–2001	Spain	47	(5)
1995–2005	Catalonia	7	(0)

Managerial career
- 2007–2008: Barcelona B
- 2008–2012: Barcelona
- 2013–2016: Bayern Munich
- 2016–2026: Manchester City
Medal record
Men's football
Representing Spain
Olympic Games
Gold medal – first place	1992 Barcelona	Team
- * Club domestic league appearances and goals

Josep "Pep" Guardiola Sala (Catalan: [ˈpɛb‿ɡwəɾðiˈɔlə]; born 18 January 1971) is a Catalan football manager and former player from Spain. He is the global ambassador of the City Football Group and was most recently manager of Premier League club Manchester City. Widely regarded as one of the greatest football managers in history, Guardiola is one of only two managers to have won the continental treble twice, and holds the record for the most consecutive league matches won in La Liga, Bundesliga, and the Premier League. (Note: Barcelona (16 matches, 2010–11), Bayern Munich (19 matches, 2013–14), and Manchester City (18 matches, 2017–18).)

A defensive midfielder who played in a deep-lying playmaker's role, Guardiola spent most of his career with Barcelona, forming part of Johan Cruyff's Dream Team that won the club's first European Cup in 1992, and four successive Spanish league titles from 1991 to 1994. He captained the team from 1997 until his departure from Barcelona in 2001. Guardiola then had stints with Brescia and Roma in Italy, Al-Ahli in Qatar and Dorados in Mexico. He was capped 47 times for the Spanish national team and appeared at the 1994 FIFA World Cup, as well as UEFA Euro 2000. He also played friendly matches for Catalonia.

Guardiola briefly managed Barcelona B and won the Tercera División title before taking charge of the first team in 2008. In his first season, he led Barcelona to the continental treble of La Liga, the Copa del Rey and the UEFA Champions League, becoming the youngest manager to win the latter competition. He was named the FIFA World Coach of the Year in 2011 after leading the club to another La Liga and Champions League double in the 2010–11 season. Guardiola left Barcelona in 2012 after four years in charge having won 14 honours, a club record.

Guardiola joined Bayern Munich in 2013 and won the Bundesliga in each of his three seasons, also leading the club to two domestic doubles. In 2016, he left the club for Manchester City and won 20 major trophies in his ten-year tenure, including six Premier League titles: his first title set numerous domestic records, including becoming the first team to attain 100 points in a season. He also won a domestic treble in 2018–19, the Champions League as part of his second continental treble in 2022–23, and led the club to four successive league titles, the only manager to do in English top flight history. He left the club after the 2025–26 season and currently holds the record for the club's longest serving manager by matches managed. Guardiola's tenure partially overlapped with the period in which Manchester City were found to have breached Premier League financial rules.

== Club career ==
=== 1988–2001: Barcelona ===
Born in Santpedor, Catalonia, Spain, Guardiola joined La Masia at age 13 from Gimnàstic Manresa and rose through the ranks of Barcelona's youth academy for six years, making his debut in 1990 against Cádiz. As Phil Ball writes in Morbo,

In his first week at the club, Johan Cruyff turned up unannounced at the Mini Estadi, a venue just down the road from Camp Nou used by Barcelona B. Just before half-time he wandered into the dug-out and asked Charly Rexach, the youth team manager at the time, the name of the young lad playing on the right side of midfield. "Guardiola – good lad," came the reply. Cruyff ignored the comment and told Rexach to move him into the middle for the second half, to play as pivot. It was a difficult position to adapt to and one not used by many teams in Spain at the time. Guardiola adjusted immediately, as Cruyff had suspected he would, and when he moved to the first-team in 1990, he became the pivot of the Dream Team.

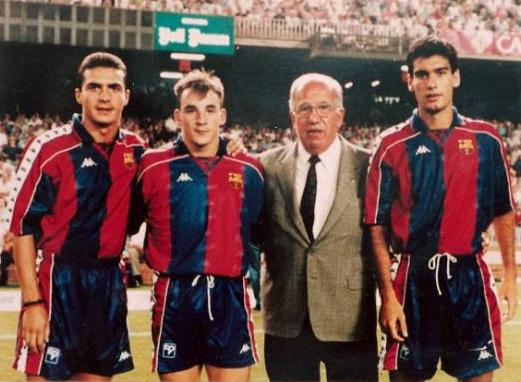
21-year-old Guardiola (right), pictured with FC Barcelona teammates Guillermo Amor, Albert Ferrer, and club vice-president Josep Mussons, in 1992

Guardiola became a first-team regular in the 1991–92 season, and at only 20 years old was a key component of a side that won La Liga and the European Cup. The Italian magazine Guerin Sportivo heralded Guardiola as the finest player in the world under the age of 21. Cruyff's "Dream Team" went on to retain La Liga title in the 1992–93 and 1993–94 seasons. The side again reached the 1994 UEFA Champions League final, but were beaten 4–0 by Fabio Capello's AC Milan side in Athens. Cruyff left in 1996, with Barcelona finishing fourth in the 1994–95 season and third in the 1995–96 season, but Guardiola retained his position at the centre of Barcelona's midfield.

In the 1996–97 season, Barcelona, this time led by Bobby Robson, won three cups: the Copa del Rey, the Supercopa de España, and the European Cup Winners' Cup. In 1997, Guardiola was named as Barcelona captain under new manager Louis van Gaal, but a calf muscle injury ruled Guardiola out of most of the 1997–98 season, in which Barcelona won a league and cup double. At the end of the season, Barcelona rejected offers from Roma and Parma (of around 300 million pesetas) for Guardiola. After prolonged and complicated contract talks, he signed a new contract with Barcelona that extended his stay until 2001.

Guardiola returned to action the following season and Barcelona once again won La Liga. On 8 June 1998, Guardiola underwent surgery to try to resolve his lingering calf injury, which had caused him to miss the 1998 FIFA World Cup for Spain. A largely disappointing 1999–2000 season again ended in surgery, with Guardiola missing the last three months of the season with a serious ankle injury.

On 11 April 2001, Barcelona's captain announced his intention to leave the club after 17 years of service. He stated that it was a personal decision and, in part, a response to what he perceived as football heading in a new, more physical, direction. On 24 June 2001, Guardiola played his last match with Barcelona in the final game of the season against Celta Vigo. Guardiola played 479 games in 12 seasons for the first team, winning 16 trophies. At the press conference after the Celta game, he said: "It's been a long journey. I'm happy, proud, happy with the way people treated me and I have made many friends. I cannot ask for more. I have had many years in the elite. I did not come to make history but to make my own history." A number of future Barcelona midfielders, including Xavi, Andrés Iniesta and Cesc Fàbregas, have hailed Guardiola as their role model and hero.

=== 2001–2006: Later career ===
After leaving Barcelona in 2001 at age 30, Guardiola joined Serie A side Brescia as Andrea Pirlo's replacement in the deep-lying playmaker role, where he played alongside Roberto Baggio under manager Carlo Mazzone. Following his stint at Brescia, Guardiola transferred to Roma. His time in Italy, however, was unsuccessful and included a four-month ban for testing positive for nandrolone (for which he was later cleared of all charges after a protracted legal process in 2009).

After his career with Brescia and Roma, in 2003, Guardiola played in Qatar with Al-Ahli from Doha in the Qatar Stars League. In 2005–06, he turned down offers from a number of European clubs, as he felt his playing career was coming to a close.

In 2006, Juan Manuel Lillo was appointed the manager of Mexican club Dorados. Lillo recruited Guardiola to play for the club while he was in managing school in Axocopán, Atlixco, Puebla. Guardiola played with Dorados for six months, but was limited to ten appearances due to injuries, before retiring. He scored one goal for the club.

== International career ==
=== Spain ===
On 14 October 1992, Guardiola debuted for the Spain national football team in a friendly match against Northern Ireland. The same year, he served as Spain when they won a gold medal at the Barcelona Olympic Games. That same year he won the Bravo Award, which recognises the world's best player under the age of 21.

Guardiola was a member of the Spanish team during the 1994 FIFA World Cup, where they reached the quarter-finals, losing 2–1 to Italy. Due to disagreements, he fell out of favour with Spain coach Javier Clemente and missed out on UEFA Euro 1996. Guardiola suffered a career-threatening injury in 1998 which kept him out of the year's World Cup, but later played at Euro 2000, where Spain reached another quarter-final, this time losing to France, 2–1. He continued to play in the Spanish midfield until his final appearance on 14 November 2001, in a 1–0 victory in a friendly match against Mexico. Guardiola scored his last international goal against Sweden in a 1–1 friendly draw during his 45th appearance.

=== Catalonia ===
Guardiola has played for and advocated on behalf of the Catalonia football team. Between 1995 and 2005, he played seven friendly matches for Catalonia.

== Player profile ==
=== Style of play ===
Guardiola was a highly creative, hard-working, nimble, and elegant player with good anticipation, tactical awareness, and an ability to read the game. Throughout his career, he was usually deployed as either a central or defensive midfielder in front of his team's back-line, although he was also capable of playing in more attacking midfield roles. Although he was competent defensively and able to press opponents to break up play and win the ball effectively through his team-work and defensive positioning, he also had a tendency to give away many fouls; as such, and also in part due to his slender physical build, he usually functioned as a deep-lying playmaker in front of the defence, where he excelled courtesy of his technical ability and intelligent, efficient, precise passing game. He would also occasionally drop deeper to act as an additional centre-back in Cruyff's fluid 3–4–3 formation at Barcelona. Despite his lack of notable pace, dribbling ability, aerial prowess, or strong physical or athletic attributes, Guardiola was highly regarded throughout his career for his vision, close control, passing range, positional sense, and calm composure on the ball, as well as his speed of thought, which enabled him to retain possession under pressure and either set the tempo of his team's play in midfield with quick and intricate short first-time exchanges, or switch the play or create chances with longer passes. His role has also been likened to that of a metodista ("centre-half", in Italian football jargon), due to his ability to dictate play in midfield as well as assist his team defensively.

Guardiola was capable of being an offensive threat, due to his ability to make attacking runs or strike accurately from distance; he was also effective at creating chances or shooting on goal from set-pieces. Having served as captain of both Barcelona and the Spanish national side, he also stood out for his leadership throughout his career. He was also known to be injury prone throughout his career.

=== Reception ===
Guardiola's playing style, which relied on creativity, technique and ball movement, rather than physicality and pace, inspired several future diminutive Spanish playmaking midfielders, such as Xavi, Andrés Iniesta, and Cesc Fàbregas, with the latter describing him as his "idol". Pirlo instead described Guardiola as the "model" for the position which he himself occupied deep in midfield. Former Barcelona president Joan Laporta once described Guardiola as "the best central midfielder in our history." Johan Cruyff considered him to be one of the best midfielders of his generation, a view echoed by Richard Jolly of FourFourTwo and Marco Frattino, the latter of whom stated in 2018: "Twenty years ago, [...] Pep Guardiola was one of the best midfielders in the world." In 2001, his agent Josè Maria Orobitg described him as the best in the world at dictating the tempo and rhythm of his team's play.

Miguel Val of Marca considered Guardiola to be one of the greatest Spanish players of all time, describing him as the "brains of Barcelona's Dream Team under Johan Cruyff" in 2020. Federico Aquè described him as one of the best deep-lying playmakers in European football in his prime, while Lee Bushe of 90min.com even included him in his list of "The Best Deep-Lying Playmakers of All Time" in 2020.

== Managerial career ==
=== Barcelona ===
==== B team ====
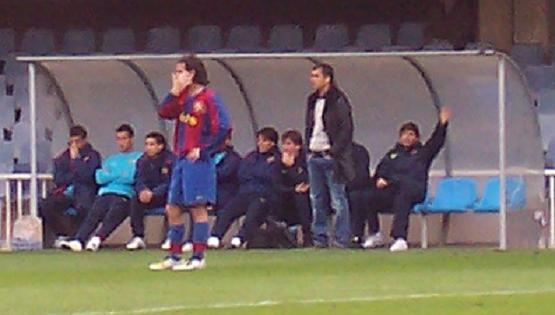
Guardiola coaching Barcelona B in 2008

Guardiola, after he turned down the offer to be a director, assumed managerial duties of Barcelona B on 21 June 2007, with Tito Vilanova as his assistant. Under his guidance, the team subsequently won their Tercera División group and qualified for the 2008 Segunda División B playoffs, which the team won, thereby achieving promotion. Barcelona President Joan Laporta announced in May 2008 that Guardiola would be appointed manager of the senior Barcelona squad to replace Frank Rijkaard at the end of the 2007–08 season.

==== 2008–09: First season with first team and historic treble ====
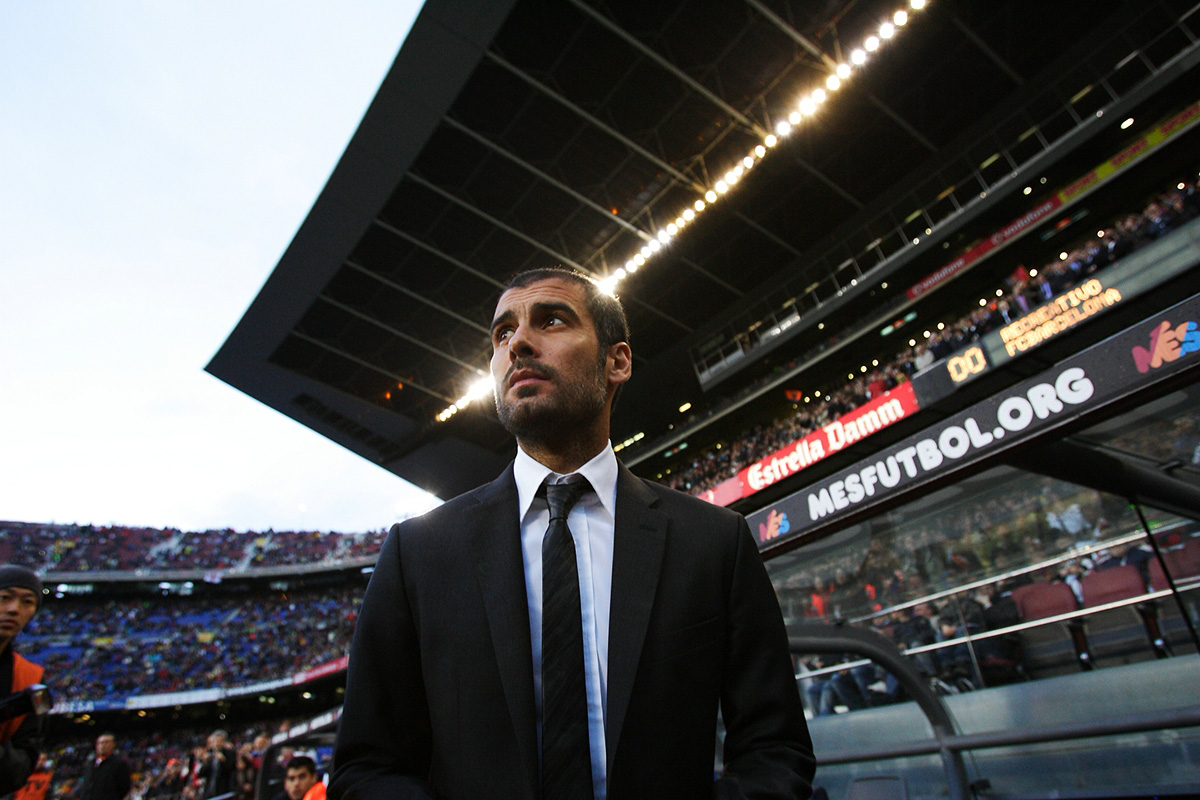
Guardiola managing Barcelona in 2009

Upon being appointed, Guardiola made headlines by announcing that stars such as Ronaldinho, Deco and Samuel Eto'o were not part of his plans for the coming season, though Eto'o was, in the end, allowed to remain.

In association with Barcelona Director of Sport Txiki Begiristain, several new signings were made by Guardiola – Dani Alves and Seydou Keita arrived from Sevilla; Martín Cáceres from Villarreal by way of Recreativo; Gerard Piqué returned from Manchester United; and Alexander Hleb was signed from Arsenal. Along with the new signings, Guardiola promoted canteranos Sergio Busquets, Pedro and Jeffrén to the first-team squad. In interviews with the press, Guardiola stressed a harder work ethic than before, but also a more personal approach during training and a closer relationship with his players.

Guardiola's first competitive game as manager was in the third qualifying round of the Champions League, in which Barcelona comfortably beat Polish club Wisła Kraków 4–0 in the first leg at home. They then lost 1–0 in the second leg, but progressed with a 4–1 aggregate victory. Promoted Numancia also defeated Barcelona in the opening matchday of the 2008–09 La Liga, but the team then went on an undefeated streak for over 20 matches to move to the top of the league. Barcelona maintained their spot atop La Liga's table, securing their first league title since 2006 when rivals Real Madrid lost at Villarreal on 16 May 2009. The most important match, however, was on 2 May when they defeated Real Madrid 6–2 at the Santiago Bernabéu. The league title was the second piece of silverware in Guardiola's first season at the club. Earlier, on 13 May, Barcelona won the 2008–09 Copa del Rey, beating Athletic Bilbao 4–1 in the 2009 Copa del Rey final.

In the final of the Champions League, Barcelona beat Manchester United 2–0. In doing so, they became the first Spanish club to win the domestic cup, the league, and the European club titles (the treble) in the same season. Guardiola became the youngest man to manage a Champions League winning team, at age 37. The treble-winning season is regarded as one of the club's finest in its history.

==== 2009–10: Six trophies in a calendar year ====
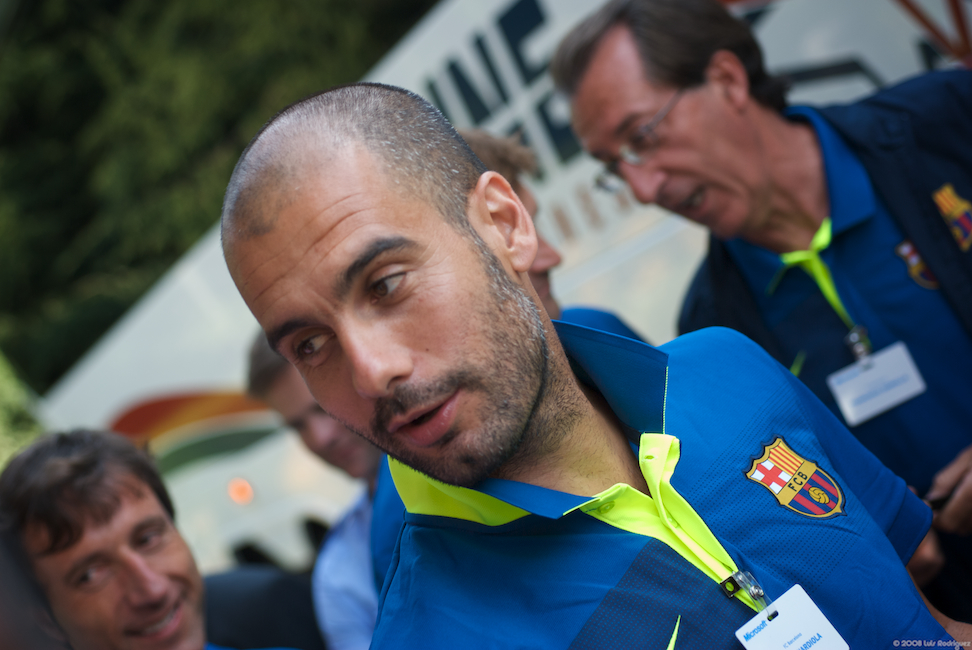
Guardiola in 2010

Guardiola's second season as manager began with defeats of Athletic Bilbao in the Supercopa de España and Shakhtar Donetsk in the UEFA Super Cup. On 25 September 2009, Barcelona gave him his 50th professional victory, away against Málaga and on 19 December, they were crowned FIFA Club World Cup champions for the first time in their history.

Guardiola finished the calendar year with a record six trophies, the Spanish League, Copa del Rey, Champions League, Spanish Super Cup, European Super Cup and Club World Cup, becoming the first manager in history to do so. In January 2010, he became Barcelona's longest serving Spanish manager, overtaking the record previously held by Josep Samitier. He agreed to a one-year contract extension to keep him with Barcelona until the end of the 2010–11 season.

In February 2010, Guardiola managed his 100th match for Barcelona's first team. His record stood at 71 wins, 19 draws and 10 losses, with 242 goals for and 76 against. On 10 April 2010, he became the first manager in Barcelona's history to beat Real Madrid four times in a row in El Clásico. Barcelona reached the semi-finals of the 2009–10 Champions League, but lost 3–2 on aggregate to José Mourinho's Inter Milan. Despite this, they managed to win their 20th La Liga title with 99 points by beating Real Valladolid 4–0 at home. At the time, this was the highest points total ever gained amongst any of Europe's major leagues. The La Liga title was Guardiola's seventh trophy as manager of the club, tying Ferdinand Daučík for second behind Johan Cruyff and his 11 trophies.

==== 2010–11: Second Champions League title ====
On 21 August, Barcelona beat Sevilla 5–3 on aggregate to win the 2010 Supercopa de España, his second in a row. On 29 November 2010, Barcelona beat Real Madrid 5–0, giving Guardiola five straight wins in El Clásico. On 8 February 2011, Guardiola accepted the club's offer for a one-year deal extension, signing a contract until June 2012.

On 11 May 2011, Barcelona won the La Liga title and the club's third in a row after a 1–1 draw with Levante. On 28 May, Barcelona beat Manchester United 3–1 at Wembley in the 2011 Champions League final.

==== 2011–12: Final season ====
The season started with a 5–4 aggregate win over Real Madrid for the Supercopa de España.

Barcelona won their second trophy of the season on 26 August, beating Porto 2–0 in the 2011 UEFA Super Cup. With the trophy won against Porto, he became all-time record holder of most titles won as a manager at Barcelona, with 12 trophies in only three years. November of the same year saw Guardiola manage his 200th match for Barcelona's first team. His record stood at 144 wins, 39 draws and 17 losses with 500 goals for and 143 against.

Barcelona ended the 2011 calendar year winning the Club World Cup, beating Brazilian club Santos 4–0 in the final, the widest margin in an Intercontinental Cup/Club World Cup final since changing to a single match format. This was Guardiola's 13th title of only 16 tournaments played. On 9 January 2012, he was named FIFA World Coach of the Year. On his 41st birthday, he led his side to a 2–1 victory over arch-rivals Real Madrid in El Clásico, ensuring that he remained unbeaten against Real Madrid in regular time as a manager. On 21 April, Guardiola conceded the league title to leaders Real Madrid after they beat Barcelona 2–1 and extended their lead in the table to seven points with four matches remaining.

On 24 April, a 2–2 draw at home against Chelsea in the second leg of the Champions League semi-final knocked Barcelona out of the competition on a 2–3 aggregate score. That effectively left the team with only the Copa del Rey to play for. Guardiola had faced criticism over his recent tactics and squad selections. On 27 April 2012, he announced he would step down as Barcelona's manager at the end of the 2011–12 season. He had been on a rolling contract that was renewed annually during his tenure as manager. Citing tiredness as the main reason for his decision, he also commented that four years at a club like Barcelona felt like an eternity.

Guardiola continued to lead Barcelona to wins in the remaining La Liga games of the season, followed by a 3–0 win in the Copa del Rey final. His record of 14 trophies in four seasons has made him the most successful manager in Barcelona's history. Barcelona announced that he would be succeeded by Tito Vilanova, who would begin leading the first team at the start of the 2012–13 season.

==== Sabbatical ====
After his time at Barcelona came to an end, Guardiola took a year's sabbatical in New York City. On 7 January 2013, he came in third place for the 2012 FIFA World Coach of the Year, behind the winner Vicente del Bosque and runner-up José Mourinho. While at a news conference at the 2012 FIFA Ballon d'Or gala in Zürich, Guardiola said: "I have taken a decision to return to coaching but beyond that no decision has been taken. I don't have a team to go to but I would like to go back to coaching."

=== Bayern Munich ===
==== 2013–2015: Consecutive Bundesliga titles ====
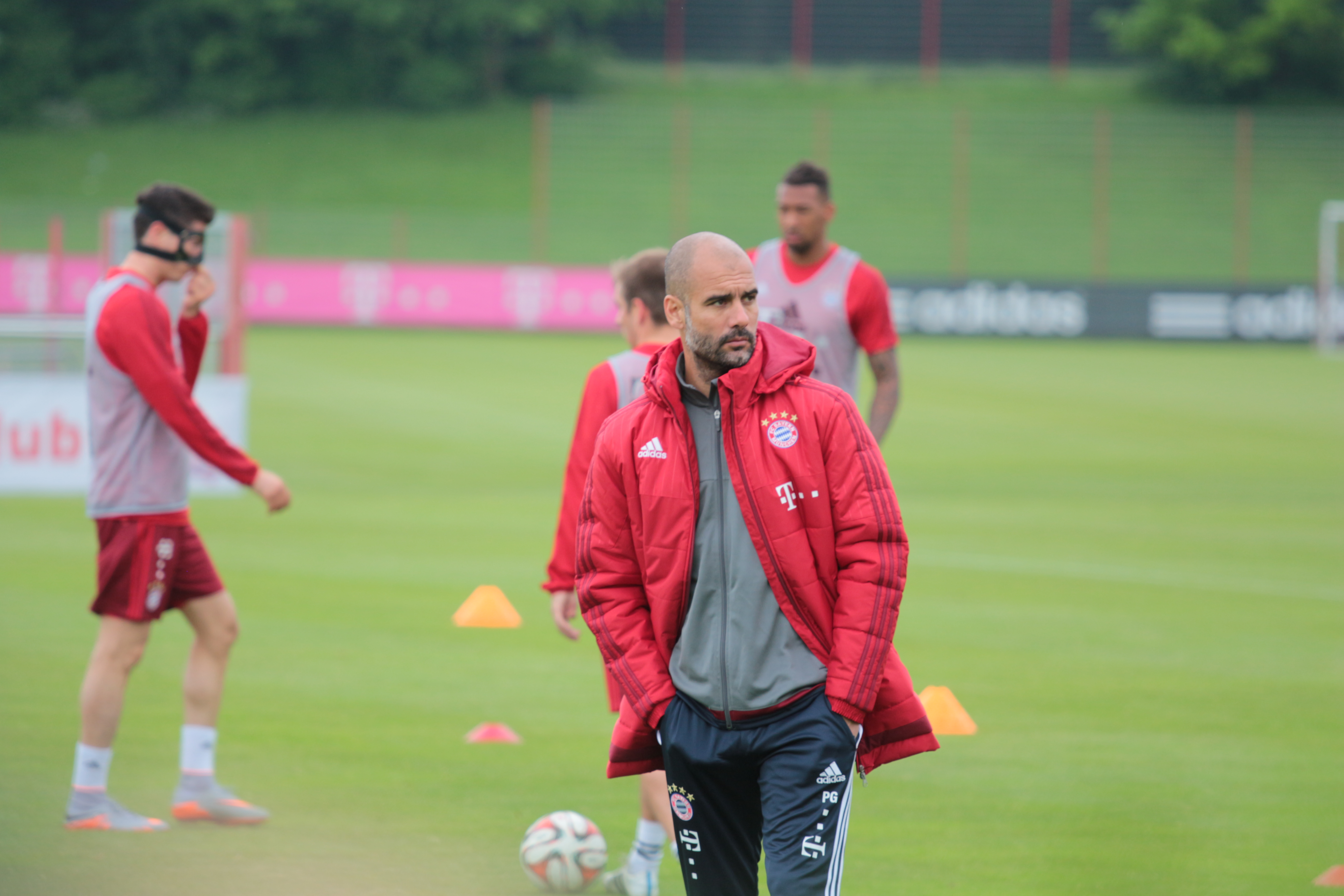
Guardiola managing Bayern Munich in 2013

On 16 January 2013, it was announced that Guardiola would take over as manager of Bundesliga club Bayern Munich after the 2012–13 season, replacing Jupp Heynckes for the following season. He addressed his first press conference at Bayern, on 24 June 2013, in German, and had his first training session two days later. His first official match was the German Super Cup against Borussia Dortmund, with Bayern losing 4–2. His first trophy with Bayern was the 2013 UEFA Super Cup, defeating longtime adversary José Mourinho, who had just returned to manage at Chelsea. Bayern beat ten-man Chelsea in a shoot-out after Manuel Neuer saved Romelu Lukaku's kick.

In December 2013, Guardiola won his third Club World Cup after beating Raja Casablanca in Morocco. On 25 March 2014, he led Bayern to their 23rd Bundesliga title by beating Hertha Berlin 3–1 at the Olympiastadion in Berlin. With seven matches remaining in the season, it was the earliest the championship had been won in Bundesliga history, breaking the record Heynckes' Bayern had set in the previous season. Guardiola broke Karl-Heinz Feldkamp's record for the longest winning streak to start his tenure at a Bundesliga club. The streak ended at 28 when Augsburg defeated Bayern 1–0 on matchday 29. The streak also ended Bayern's 53–match undefeated streak.

Bayern were drawn against Real Madrid in the semi–finals of Champions League. Bayern lost the first leg 1–0 and the second leg 4–0. The first leg was also Guardiola's first defeat at the Santiago Bernabéu. He finished the 2013–14 season by winning the DFB-Pokal 2–0 in extra–time.

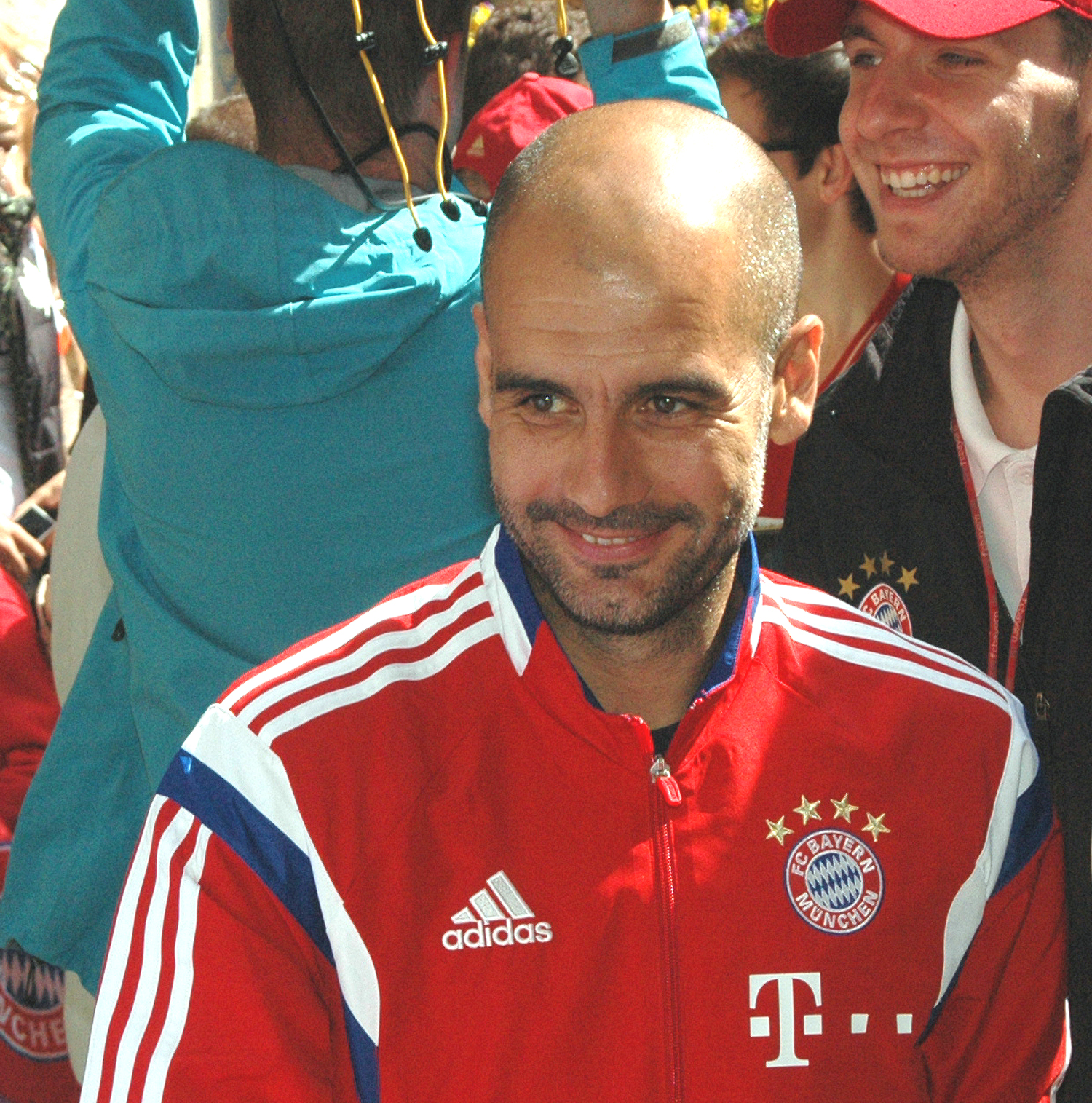
Guardiola in 2014

In the 2014–15 season, Bayern lost the German Super Cup 2–0 to Borussia Dortmund. On 11 March 2015, Bayern defeated Shakhtar Donetsk 7–0, tying their largest win in Champions League history. In Guardiola's 100th match as manager, Bayern defeated Porto 6–1. With the win, Bayern reached their fourth-straight Champions League semi-final. On 28 April 2015, Bayern were knocked out of the German Cup in a penalty shoot-out. Bayern had missed all four of their shots. In his first competitive match against Barcelona, Bayern lost 3–0. Bayern failed to get a shot on target in the match. For the first time in his career, he lost four in a row (including the shoot-out loss).

==== 2015–16: Second domestic double and final season ====
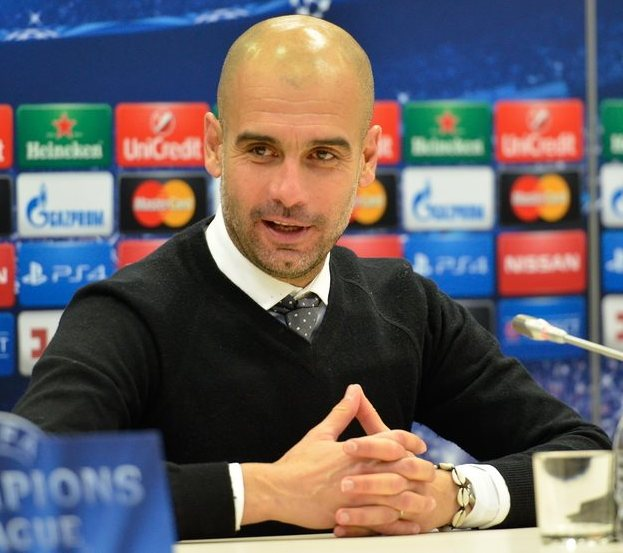
Guardiola during a press conference in 2015

The 2015–16 season started on 1 August 2015 when Bayern lost in a shoot-out to Wolfsburg in the German Super Cup. In the league, Bayern won their first ten matches. The first time they dropped points in the league was on 30 October 2015 in a 0–0 scoreline against Eintracht Frankfurt and their first loss in the league was on 5 December 2015 in a 3–1 scoreline to Borussia Mönchengladbach. In the Champions League group stage, Bayern won Group F, winning five out of the six matches. Bayern's only loss in the Champions League group stage was against Arsenal on 20 October. This was Bayern's first loss in all competitions during the 2015–16 season.

On 20 December, Bayern confirmed that Guardiola was leaving the club after his contract expired at the end of the season, with Carlo Ancelotti his replacement for the 2016–17 season.

On 3 May 2016, Guardiola's Bayern Munich lost to Atlético Madrid in the Champions League semi-finals stage, thereby ending his final chance of winning a Champions League title with the Bavarian club. Guardiola's final match was on 21 May 2016, with Bayern defeating Borussia Dortmund in a shootout. He finished with a record of 82 wins, eleven draws and nine losses in the Bundesliga; a record of 14 wins, three draws and no losses in the DFB-Pokal; a record of 23 wins, five draws and eight losses in the UEFA Champions League. He also went a combined two wins, two draws, and two losses in the FIFA Club World Cup, UEFA Super Cup, and the German Super Cup. In non–official competitions, he went a combined six wins, one draw, and one loss.

=== Manchester City ===
==== 2016–17: Adjustment to England and first season ====
On 1 February 2016, Manchester City signed Guardiola to a three-year contract for the start of the 2016–17 season. Guardiola brought in several significant players in the summer, including midfielders İlkay Gündoğan from Borussia Dortmund and Nolito from Celta Vigo, winger Leroy Sané from Schalke 04 and defender John Stones from Everton. He also controversially replaced long-serving City starting goalkeeper Joe Hart with Claudio Bravo from his former club Barcelona; Hart would never make another appearance for the club.

On 13 August 2016, Guardiola earned victory in his first match of the Premier League season, as City defeated Sunderland 2–1. On 11 September, Guardiola won his first Manchester derby as a manager in a 2–1 City victory at Old Trafford; this was also his sixth win against his "rival" manager José Mourinho.

City were leaders going into the international break, but their form declined thereafter. Manchester City lost to Everton 0–4 on 15 January 2017; this was Guardiola's biggest-ever managerial defeat in a domestic competition. In Europe, City were eliminated in the Champions League round of 16 by Monaco on away goals after a 6–6 aggregate draw. The second leg of the tie was Guardiola's 100th game as a manager in European competition, and he arrived at that mark with the best record of any manager, having earned 61 wins and 23 draws (one draw better than the previous record holder, Guardiola's former manager at Barcelona, Louis van Gaal). Following a loss to Arsenal in the FA Cup semi-finals, Guardiola finished the season without a trophy for the first time in his managerial career.

==== 2017–18: "Centurions" and first Premier League title ====
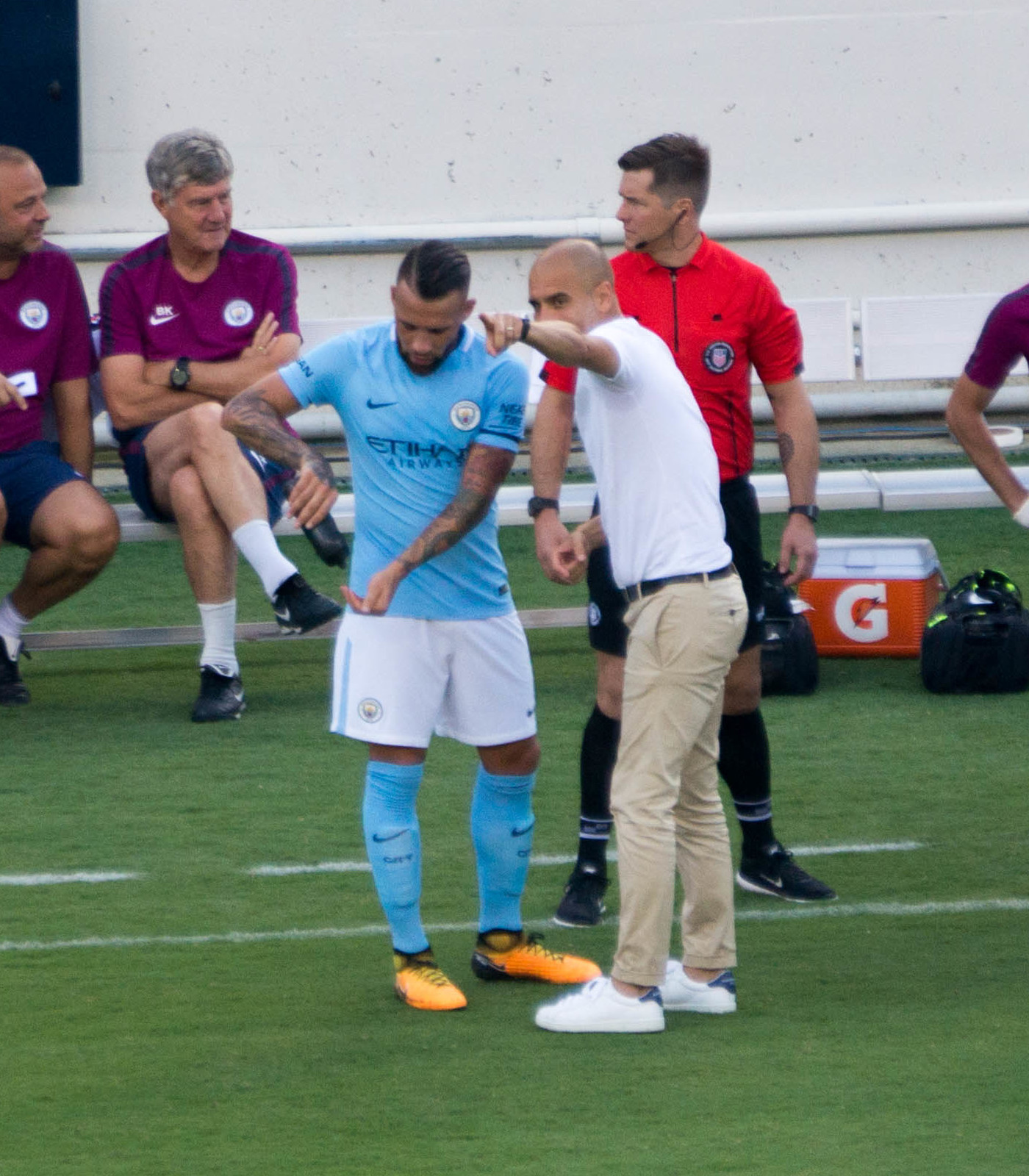
Guardiola giving instructions to Nicolás Otamendi during a friendly match against Tottenham Hotspur in the 2017 International Champions Cup

Guardiola identified the defensive areas which required improvement for Manchester City in the summer transfer window to challenge for the league title, particularly in the goalkeeper and full-back positions. Due to Bravo's struggles the previous season, Ederson was brought in as the new first-choice goalkeeper. Wing-backs Benjamin Mendy and Kyle Walker were also signed, while dispensing of all the previous senior full-backs at the club in Aleksandar Kolarov, Gaël Clichy, Bacary Sagna and Pablo Zabaleta. Additionally, Bernardo Silva and Danilo were also acquired from Monaco and Real Madrid, respectively.

On 25 February 2018, City won the 2017–18 EFL Cup after beating Arsenal 3–0 in the final, which was Guardiola's first trophy with the club. On 15 April, City were confirmed as 2017–18 Premier League champions following Manchester United's 1–0 home defeat to West Bromwich Albion. After finishing the league season with a record-breaking 100 points, Guardiola signed a new contract with City until 2021.

==== 2018–2020: Domestic treble and Champions League disappointment ====
During Guardiola's third season as manager, Manchester City signed Riyad Mahrez from Leicester City for a fee of £60 million. On 5 August 2018, City kicked off the season with a 2–0 victory over FA Cup holders Chelsea in the 2018 FA Community Shield.

On 24 February 2019, Guardiola's side played Chelsea in the EFL Cup final held at Wembley. The match ended 0–0 after extra time, and Manchester City won 4–3 on penalties to retain the trophy for the second year in a row. On 9 April, City faced Tottenham Hotspur in the first leg of their Champions League quarter-finals, held at Tottenham's new stadium. The game ended in a 0–1 defeat for City. The second leg was held at the Etihad Stadium on 17 April, where Guardiola's side beat Tottenham 4–3, with City's last-minute fifth goal having been controversially disallowed. Due to the aggregate score being a 4–4 draw, Tottenham went through to the semi-finals on away goals. On 12 May, Guardiola secured a second consecutive Premier League title. His side finished on 98 points, one point above Liverpool, after a 4–1 victory at Brighton & Hove Albion in the final match of the season. On 18 May, City beat Watford 6–0 in the final of the FA Cup, becoming the first ever men's team in England to win a domestic treble.

Guardiola made two major acquisitions during the summer transfer window of 2019 in defender João Cancelo from Juventus for £27.4m plus Danilo and midfielder Rodri from Atlético Madrid for a fee of £62.8 million, a club record. These signings meant that the value of the City squad had exceeded €1 billion, becoming the first football club in the world to assemble a squad with this value. On 4 August 2019, City began the season with a penalty shoot-out victory against Liverpool in the Community Shield, claiming the trophy for the second straight year. During the match, Guardiola also became the first Premier League manager to receive a yellow card from the referee. On 1 March, Manchester City beat Aston Villa 2–1 in the 2020 EFL Cup final, winning the competition for a third successive season. City finished second in the 2019–20 Premier League after a spring hiatus due to the COVID-19 pandemic. After defeating Real Madrid in the 2019–20 Champions League round of 16, Guardiola's side faced Lyon in the single-elimination quarter-finals on 15 August 2020. City lost the match 1–3 and was eliminated at the quarter-final stage for the third season in a row.

==== 2020–2024: Premier League four-peat, Champions League win and continental treble ====
The 2020–21 season saw City's defence greatly improve compared to the last campaign, conceding just one goal in twelve matches played. On 19 November 2020, Guardiola signed a new two-year contract with Manchester City until summer 2023. He won his 500th game as manager after City beat Sheffield United 1–0 at home in the Premier League on 31 January 2021; it was the ninth game City had won in January, becoming the team with the most wins in a single month in the top four tiers of English football since the Football League began in 1888. Following a 3–1 victory over Swansea City in the FA Cup on 10 February, Guardiola's side broke the record for the longest winning run in English top-flight football history, with fifteen straight victories for City in all competitions.

Guardiola won his third Premier League title on 11 May after Manchester United's home defeat to Leicester City, two weeks after beating Tottenham Hotspur 1–0 in the 2021 EFL Cup final to claim that trophy for the fourth successive time. On 29 May, Manchester City played in the Champions League final for the first time in their history, losing to Chelsea 0–1. Following the match, Guardiola was criticised for his team selection and not starting a defensive midfielder. Chelsea manager Thomas Tuchel also admitted that he was surprised not to see midfielder Fernandinho in the City starting line-up.

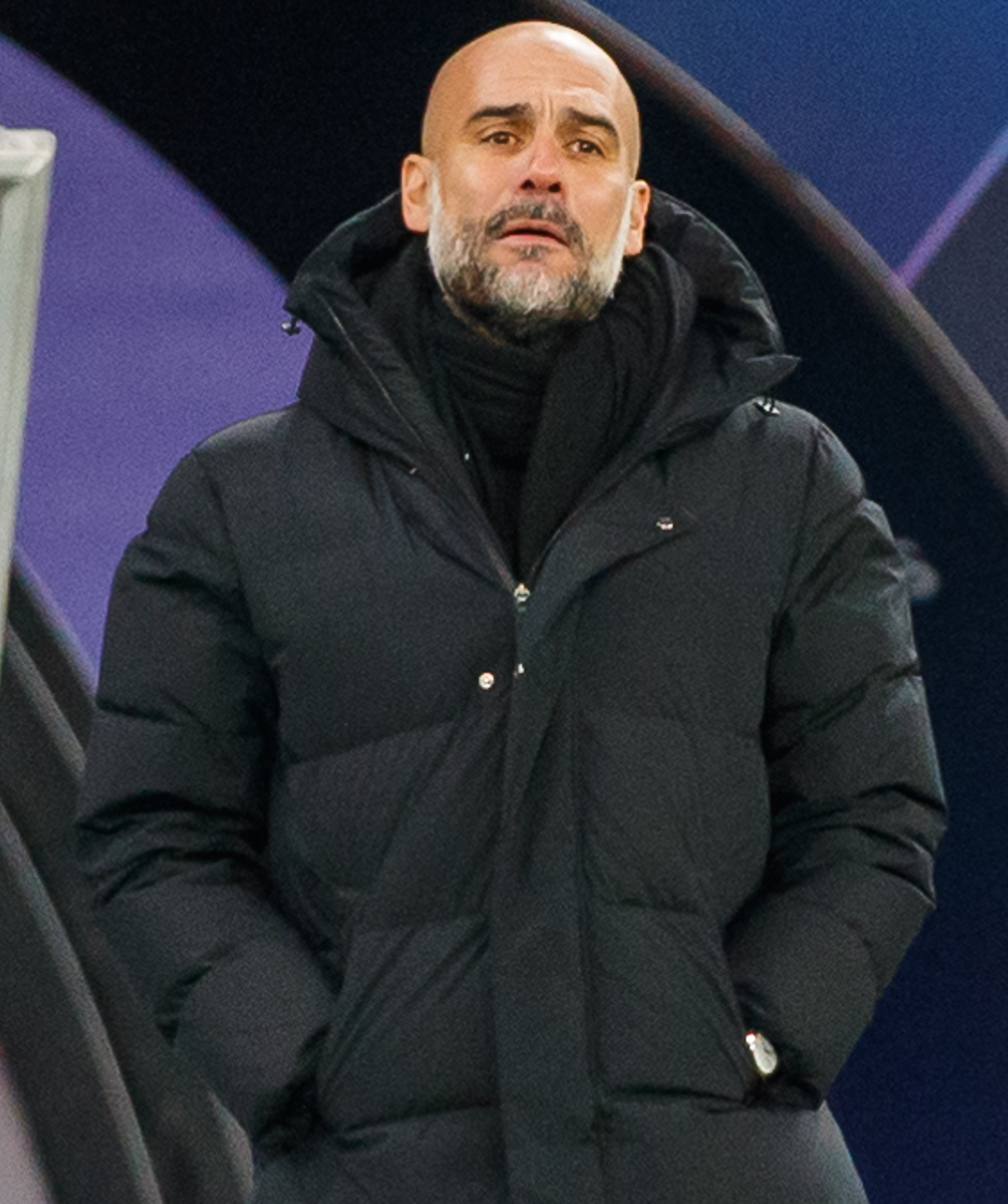
Guardiola as manager of Manchester City in 2021

During the summer transfer window of 2021, Manchester City broke the British transfer record by signing Aston Villa midfielder Jack Grealish for £100m. On 25 September, he surpassed Les McDowall as the manager with the most wins in Manchester City history following their 1–0 away victory over Chelsea in the Premier League. On 22 May 2022, Manchester City won the Premier League with a 3–2 victory over Aston Villa. This was Guardiola's fourth title at the club, placing him second on the list of managers with the most Premier League titles.

During the 2022–23 season, Manchester City won their third consecutive Premier League title, their fifth under Guardiola. On 23 November 2022, Guardiola signed a new two-year contract with Manchester City until summer 2025. On 3 June 2023, the club won their second FA Cup under Guardiola after a 2–1 victory over rivals Manchester United in the final to achieve another domestic double. On 10 June 2023, he led the club to their first Champions League title, and his personal third, after a 1–0 win against Inter Milan in the final, which completed their continental treble.

On 16 August 2023, Guardiola won a record-equalling fourth UEFA Super Cup title, also becoming the first-ever manager to win the trophy with three clubs, as the Mancunian side defeated Sevilla 5–4 on penalties following a 1–1 draw. On 22 December, Guardiola guided City to their first FIFA Club World Cup trophy, as they beat Fluminense 4–0 in the final, and became the first English club to win five titles in a calendar year. With this achievement, Guardiola became the first manager in history to win four FIFA Club World Cup titles. Following the match, Guardiola stated that he "had the feeling [...] would close the chapter, we won all the titles, there's nothing else to win. I had a feeling the job was done, it was over".

Man City's Champions League defence was ended in the quarter finals following a 4–3 loss on penalties after a 4—4 aggregate draw to Real Madrid who Man City beat 5–1 in the semi finals of the previous Champions League which ended Man City's hope of consecutive continental trebles.

On 19 May 2024, Man City beat West Ham United 3–1 on the final day of the season to win their fourth straight Premier League title with 91 points, two points ahead of Arsenal, becoming the first English club to win four top flight league titles in a row. A week later, Man City lost the FA Cup Final to Manchester United 2–1 which ended their chance of a consecutive domestic double.

==== 2024–2026: Cup successes, final seasons and departure ====
Under Pep Guardiola, Manchester City's 2024–25 season initially mirrored the success of the previous campaign, winning the Community Shield for the first time since 2019 and for the third time in the Guardiola era and beginning the league season with an unbeaten run of nine games. However, the team's fortunes took a downturn following a 1–2 defeat to Tottenham Hotspur in the fourth round of the EFL Cup. This loss marked the beginning of a difficult period for the club, as they won only one of their next thirteen matches across all competitions.

On 9 November 2024, Manchester City were beaten 2–1 by Brighton & Hove Albion, meaning that for the first time in his managerial career, Guardiola had suffered four losses in a row in regulation time. On 22 November 2024, Guardiola signed a two-year contract extension with the club which will keep him at the Etihad until 2027, despite earlier widespread speculation that he might not renew his contract and could leave the club at the end of the 2024–25 Premier League season. However, a day later, Guardiola suffered his heaviest ever home defeat as Manchester City manager in a 4–0 defeat to Tottenham Hotspur.

On 19 February 2025, Manchester City was eliminated from the 2024–25 Champions League after a 3–6 aggregate loss to Real Madrid, marking their first failure to reach the round of sixteen since the 2012–13 season. Guardiola, reflecting on the team's struggles, openly criticized his own performance and suggested that he would not remain at the club if he were found to be the source of the problem.

With Manchester City only having the FA Cup to play for, they would make the FA Cup final for the third season in a row after beating Nottingham Forest 2–0 in the semi finals but they lost the final 1–0 to Crystal Palace marking Manchester City's second FA Cup final defeat in a row and the first time Guardiola had lost two finals in a row in the same competition in his managerial career. The loss also meant Manchester City would finish a season without a major trophy for the first time since the 2016–17 season. After a 2–0 win over Fulham on the final day of the season, Manchester City finished third in the Premier League with 71 points ensuring Champions League qualification for the 15th consecutive season but the third place finish also marked Manchester City's worst finish in the league since the 2016–17 season.

On 5 October 2025, he secured his 250th Premier League victory with a 1–0 away win over Brentford, achieving the milestone in just 349 matches and surpassing Alex Ferguson's previous record of 404 matches. A month later, on 9 November, he took charge of his 1,000th match, leading his team to a 3–0 win over Liverpool and maintaining a 71.6% overall win rate. On 28 January 2026, he recorded his 400th win with the club in 569 matches in a 2–0 win over Galatasaray in the Champions League, becoming the fastest manager in England to reach this milestone, breaking Arsène Wenger's previous record of 696 matches. Later that year, on 16 May, he won his 20th title with the club following a 1–0 victory over Chelsea in the 2026 FA Cup final. Shortly after the FA Cup final, it was widely reported that Guardiola would leave his role as Manchester City manager at the end of the 2025–26 season. On 22 May 2026, City confirmed that Guardiola would leave the club following the final match of the Premier League season. From the official Manchester City article, he mentioned that "Don't ask me the reasons I'm leaving. There is no reason."

== Ambassadorial roles ==
Following his departure from Manchester City in May 2026, Guardiola immediately accepted a role as global ambassador for City Football Group, remaining part of Sheikh Mansour's organisation.

== Manager profile ==
=== Tactics ===
Although much emphasis is placed on retaining possession of the ball and dictating play, with the intent to have the opposing side's defence chase the ball for extended periods of play, Guardiola's teams are recognised for pressing off the ball. Players press and harry the opposition collectively in an attempt to win back possession of the ball. This collective press is only conducted in the starting third of the opposition's pitch where less space exists and defence or midfield might not be well organized. Committing fouls is a key tactic to avoid getting caught on counter attacks.

As high pressing became prominent, Guardiola sought to counteract it with goalkeepers and defenders comfortable with controlling the ball and both long and short ball distribution, with goalkeepers such as Victor Valdés and Manuel Neuer also acting as sweeper-keepers at Barcelona and Bayern Munich, rushing off their line to prevent counter-attacks, and playing out from the back. At Manchester City, Ederson routinely played accurate long balls up-field when City were pressed high, at times taking the entire opposition out-of-play and creating 1-on-1 situations for City forwards. To avoid getting caught by long-range passing from City's defensive-third, the opposition defence would cautiously drop deep despite the forward line's high-press, hence creating space in the middle of the pitch.

Guardiola has stated he tries to constantly evolve his tactics. After learning the style analogous with Total Football under Johan Cruyff, Guardiola was particularly influenced by his time as a player in Mexico under his friend and manager at Dorados, Juan Manuel Lillo. Guardiola also sought help of Marcelo Bielsa to learn from him. His editorials for El Pais during the 2006 World Cup in praise of Luis Aragonés' Spanish side and Ricardo La Volpe's Mexican side reveal the extent of his reverence for possession-based, attacking football, with defenders along with the goal-keeper playing it out from the back, which Guardiola later cited as a major inspiration on multiple occasions. In one of his editorials, he called Zinedine Zidane France's best defender, pointing out how recycling possession in itself is a key defensive tactic, something that Guardiola teams would later become synonymous with. Philipp Lahm, who played for Guardiola at Bayern Munich, pointed out that Guardiola's tactics were majorly "an offensive Sacchi", modelled after the Arrigo Sacchi's Milan team of the late 1980s, emphasising fluid movement, quick recoveries, and keeping possession of the ball, which was in sharp contrast to the strictly-defensive Catenaccio–inspired style employed effectively by José Mourinho and later by Diego Simeone; and that Guardiola has evolved his approach that seemingly was now a mix of both those styles. Domènec Torrent, assistant to Guardiola for a decade, posited that Guardiola's philosophy of retaining possession of the ball for as long as possible had 3 key components: Play the ball out from the back, pass & move around opponents to attack, and press high to win the ball quickly. Paco Seirul-Lo, fitness coach at Barcelona from 1978 until 2022, said Guardiola was also influenced by tactics employed in handball by Valero Rivera López.

Tactics employed by Guardiola have been likened to Gegenpressing invented by Ralf Rangnick and used to great effect by Jürgen Klopp. His tactics have influenced approaches of managers such as Maurizio Sarri, Thomas Tuchel, Graham Potter, Xabi Alonso, Zinedine Zidane, and Luis Enrique; as well as those of other sports such as rugby. Guardiola admitted that he had to adapt his style to German and English leagues, but his "football education comes from [Catalunya]" which is possession-based, and distinct from Gegenpressing. While several pundits have often linked Guardiola's Barcelona to the tiki-taka style employed by the Spanish national side under Aragonés at Euro 2008, Guardiola himself has critically refuted this claim.

Guardiola has been praised by pundits for his flexibility as a coach, and has used several formations throughout his career, and even changing several formations within a game. At Barcelona, he often used a 4–3–3 formation with inverted wingers and attacking full-backs who would overlap and provide width to the team, as well as a 3–4–3 formation on occasion; he also later used these formations at Bayern Munich and Manchester City. In the 3–4–3 formation, defensive midfielders Sergio Busquets at Barcelona and Xabi Alonso at Bayern Münich would occasionally drop back into the back-line to act as an additional defender; this role was similar to the one Guardiola himself played under Cruyff at Barcelona. At Bayern Münich, he also used full-backs Phillip Lahm and Joshua Kimmich in midfield. Guardiola also began to use a false 9 during his time at Barcelona, fielding Lionel Messi in the centre of the team's attacking line, who would drop deep into midfield to give the team a numerical advantage in the middle of the pitch. At Manchester City, after experimenting with several formations, he used a modern version of the 3–2–2–3 formation during the 2022–23 treble–winning season, which was likened to the past WM formation. He deployed centre-back John Stones in a hybrid defensive and creative role in midfield, which Jonathan Wilson of The Guardian likened to both the libero and wing-half roles in 2023. Guardiola also used inverted full-backs who moved inside to occupy central areas of the pitch, while he also played in a more physical and direct style than in previous seasons, utilising Erling Haaland as a traditional striker.

=== Reception ===
Considered by pundits to be one of the greatest managers of all time, Guardiola is often linked with the successes of the Spanish and German national teams in 2010s, both of whom had many first-team players that were coached by him.

Jürgen Klopp credits Guardiola with building the toughest teams he has ever faced, stating: "I could say City are the toughest opponent I've ever had but it wasn't much easier when I faced Pep's Bayern [..] We push each other to insane levels."

In 2017, Italian defender Giorgio Chiellini was critical of Guardiola's philosophy, however, and expressed his belief that the popularisation of possession-based playing styles, associated with Barcelona under Guardiola, and the increasing focus on developing defenders who are comfortable with the ball at their feet from a young age in Italy, had in fact had a negative impact on their overall defensive quality. He commented: "Guardiolismo [a term he coined for "the Guardiola way"] has ruined a generation of Italian defenders a bit – now everyone is looking to push up, defenders know how to set the tone of play and they can spread the ball, but they don't know how to mark."

Several of Guardiola's former players, teammates, and coaching staff members, such as Xabi Alonso, Xavi, Luis Enrique, Erik ten Hag, and Mikel Arteta, have pursued coaching careers, and have cited Guardiola as an inspiration.

== Personal life ==
Guardiola was born to Dolors and Valentí. He has two older sisters and a younger brother, Pere Guardiola, a football agent. He is an atheist. Guardiola met his wife Cristina Serra when he was 18. They married on 29 May 2014. They have three children named Maria, Màrius and Valentina. Serra and Guardiola split in 2025. He is a distant relative to Spanish politician Anna Balletbò.

Following his tenure as Barcelona's manager, he stated that he would move to the United States to live in Manhattan, New York, for a year, until he had decided on his future. To prepare for his position as the manager of Bayern Munich, Guardiola studied German for four to five hours each day.

Guardiola supports the political independence of Catalonia. In 2015, he confirmed that he would participate in the pro-independence coalition, Junts pel Sí, in that year's regional parliamentary election. He has spoken in support of the people of Palestine and condemned the civilian loss of life in the Gaza War, referring to the situation as a genocide against Palestinians.

On 24 May 2023, Guardiola made a cameo appearance in Ted Lasso, in which Ted Lasso's (played by Jason Sudeikis) team, A.F.C. Richmond, play against Manchester City and win. Guardiola gives Lasso a handshake following City's defeat and gives Lasso a word of advice, to which Lasso responds positively. Guardiola reportedly is a fan of the show and enjoys watching it with his wife and daughter.

Guardiola was one of the 13 sports personalities named in the Pandora Papers published by the International Consortium of Investigative Journalists (ICIJ). He had an account open in the principality of Andorra until 2012, exploiting the tax amnesty that Mariano Rajoy's conservative government had enacted in Spain to regularise his fiscal situation. Until that point, he had not declared the funds held in that account to the Spanish Tax Agency.

== Career statistics ==
=== Club ===
Appearances and goals by club, season and competition
Club	Season	League			National cup (Note: Includes Copa del Rey, Coppa Italia, Qatar Emir Cup)		Continental		Other		Total	
Club	Season	Division	Apps	Goals	Apps	Goals	Apps	Goals	Apps	Goals	Apps	Goals
Barcelona C	1988–89	Segunda División B	8	1	0	0	—		—		8	1
Barcelona B	1989–90	Segunda División B	11	0	0	0	—		—		11	0
Barcelona B	1990–91	Segunda División B	33	3	—		—		6 (Note: Appearances in Segunda División B promotion playoffs)	0	39	3
Barcelona B	1991–92	Segunda División	9	2	—		—		—		9	2
Barcelona B	Total		53	5	0	0	—		6	0	59	5
Barcelona	1990–91	La Liga	4	0	0	0	—		—		4	0
Barcelona	1991–92	La Liga	26	0	0	0	11 (Note: Appearances in European Cup)	0	2 (Note: Appearances in Supercopa de España)	0	39	0
Barcelona	1992–93	La Liga	28	0	3	1	5 (Note: Four appearances in UEFA Champions League, one appearance in European Super Cup)	0	3 (Note: Two appearances in Supercopa de España, one appearance in Intercontinental Cup)	0	39	1
Barcelona	1993–94	La Liga	34	0	3	0	9 (Note: Appearance(s) in UEFA Champions League)	0	2	0	48	0
Barcelona	1994–95	La Liga	24	2	2	0	6	0	2	0	34	2
Barcelona	1995–96	La Liga	32	1	7	0	8 (Note: Appearances in UEFA Cup)	1	—		47	2
Barcelona	1996–97	La Liga	38	0	6	0	7 (Note: Appearances in UEFA Cup Winners' Cup)	1	2	0	53	1
Barcelona	1997–98	La Liga	6	0	1	0	5	0	2	0	14	0
Barcelona	1998–99	La Liga	22	1	3	0	1	0	0	0	26	1
Barcelona	1999–2000	La Liga	25	0	2	0	12	1	2	0	41	1
Barcelona	2000–01	La Liga	24	2	6	1	7	0	—		37	3
Barcelona	Total		263	6	33	2	71	3	15	0	382	11
Brescia	2001–02	Serie A	11	2	0	0	—		—		11	2
Roma	2002–03	Serie A	4	0	0	0	1	0	—		5	0
Brescia	2002–03	Serie A	13	1	0	0	—		—		13	1
Al-Ahli	2003–04	Qatar Stars League	18	2	?	0	—		?	?	18+	2
Al-Ahli	2004–05	Qatar Stars League	18	3	?	1	? (Note: Appearance(s) in Arab Champions League)	1	?	?	18+	5
Al-Ahli	Total		36	5	?	1	?	1	?	?	36+	7
Dorados	2005–06	Mexican Primera División	10	1	?	?	—		—		10+	1+
Career total			398	21	33+	3+	72+	4	21+	0	524+	28+

=== International ===
Appearances and goals by national team and year
National team	Year	Apps	Goals
Spain	1992	2	1
Spain	1993	5	0
Spain	1994	7	1
Spain	1995	0	0
Spain	1996	5	1
Spain	1997	4	1
Spain	1998	0	0
Spain	1999	9	0
Spain	2000	8	1
Spain	2001	7	0
Total		47	5

Scores and results list Spain's goal tally first, score column indicates score after each Guardiola goal

List of international goals scored by Pep Guardiola
No.	Date	Venue	Cap	Opponent	Score	Result	Competition
1	16 December 1992	Ramón Sánchez Pizjuán, Seville, Spain	2	Latvia	2–0	5–0	1994 FIFA World Cup qualification
2	27 June 1994	Soldier Field, Chicago, United States	12	Bolivia	1–0	3–1	1994 FIFA World Cup
3	14 December 1996	Mestalla, Valencia, Spain	18	FR Yugoslavia	1–0	2–0	1998 FIFA World Cup qualification
4	12 February 1997	José Rico Pérez, Alicante, Spain	20	Malta	1–0	4–0	1998 FIFA World Cup qualification
5	3 June 2000	Ullevi, Gothenburg, Sweden	35	Sweden	1–0	1–1	Friendly

=== Managerial ===
As of match played 24 May 2026

Managerial record by team and tenure
Team	From	To	Record					Ref.
Team	From	To	P	W	D	L	Win %	Ref.
Barcelona B	21 June 2007	30 June 2008	42	28	9	5	66.7	
Barcelona	1 July 2008	30 June 2012	247	179	47	21	72.5	
Bayern Munich	26 June 2013	30 June 2016	161	121	21	19	75.2	
Manchester City	1 July 2016	24 May 2026	593	416	87	90	70.2	
Total			1,043	744	164	135	71.3	

== Honours ==
=== Player ===
Barcelona B

- Segunda División B: 1990–91

Barcelona

- La Liga: 1990–91, 1991–92, 1992–93, 1993–94, 1997–98, 1998–99
- Copa del Rey: 1996–97, 1997–98
- Supercopa de España: 1991, 1992, 1994, 1996
- European Cup: 1991–92
- UEFA Cup Winners' Cup: 1996–97
- European Super Cup: 1992

Spain U23

- Olympic Games gold medal: 1992

Individual

- Bravo Award: 1992
- Olympics – Spain Best Player: 1992
- UEFA European Championship Team of the Tournament: 2000

=== Manager ===
Barcelona B

- Tercera División: 2007–08

Barcelona

- La Liga: 2008–09, 2009–10, 2010–11
- Copa del Rey: 2008–09, 2011–12; runner-up: 2010–11
- Supercopa de España: 2009, 2010, 2011
- UEFA Champions League: 2008–09, 2010–11
- UEFA Super Cup: 2009, 2011
- FIFA Club World Cup: 2009, 2011

Bayern Munich

- Bundesliga: 2013–14, 2014–15, 2015–16
- DFB-Pokal: 2013–14, 2015–16
- UEFA Super Cup: 2013
- FIFA Club World Cup: 2013

Manchester City

- Premier League: 2017–18, 2018–19, 2020–21, 2021–22, 2022–23, 2023–24
- FA Cup: 2018–19, 2022–23, 2025–26; runner-up: 2023–24, 2024–25
- EFL Cup: 2017–18, 2018–19, 2019–20, 2020–21, 2025–26
- FA Community Shield: 2018, 2019, 2024
- UEFA Champions League: 2022–23; runner-up: 2020–21
- UEFA Super Cup: 2023
- FIFA Club World Cup: 2023

Individual

- Don Balón Award: 2009, 2010
- Miguel Muñoz Trophy: 2008–09, 2009–10
- Onze d'Or Coach of the Year: 2009, 2011, 2012
- World Soccer magazine World Manager of the Year: 2009, 2011
- IFFHS World's Best Club Coach: 2009, 2011, 2023
- UEFA Team of the Year Best Coach: 2008–09, 2010–11
- La Liga Coach of the Year: 2009, 2010, 2011, 2012
- FIFA World Coach of the Year: 2011
- Globe Soccer Awards Coach Career Award: 2013
- Globe Soccer Awards Coach of the Century: 2020
- Premier League Manager of the Month: February 2017, September 2017, October 2017, November 2017, December 2017, February 2019, April 2019, January 2021, February 2021, November 2021, December 2021, February 2026, April 2026
- Premier League Manager of the Season: 2017–18, 2018–19, 2020–21, 2022–23, 2023–24
- LMA Manager of the Year: 2017–18, 2020–21, 2022–23
- LMA Premier League Manager of the Year: 2017–18, 2020–21, 2022–23, 2023–24
- League Managers Association (LMA) Hall of Fame
- UEFA Men's Coach of the Year: 2022–23
- The Best FIFA Football Coach: 2022–23

=== Decorations ===
- Gold Medal Royal Order of Sports Merit: 2010
- Catalan of the Year Award: 2009

== See also ==
- List of European Cup and UEFA Champions League winning managers
- List of English football championship-winning managers
- List of football managers with the most matches
- List of UEFA Super Cup winning managers
- List of Bundesliga winning managers
- List of FA Cup winning managers
- List of La Liga winning managers
