= List of Manchester City F.C. managers =

Details of the managers of Manchester City F.C

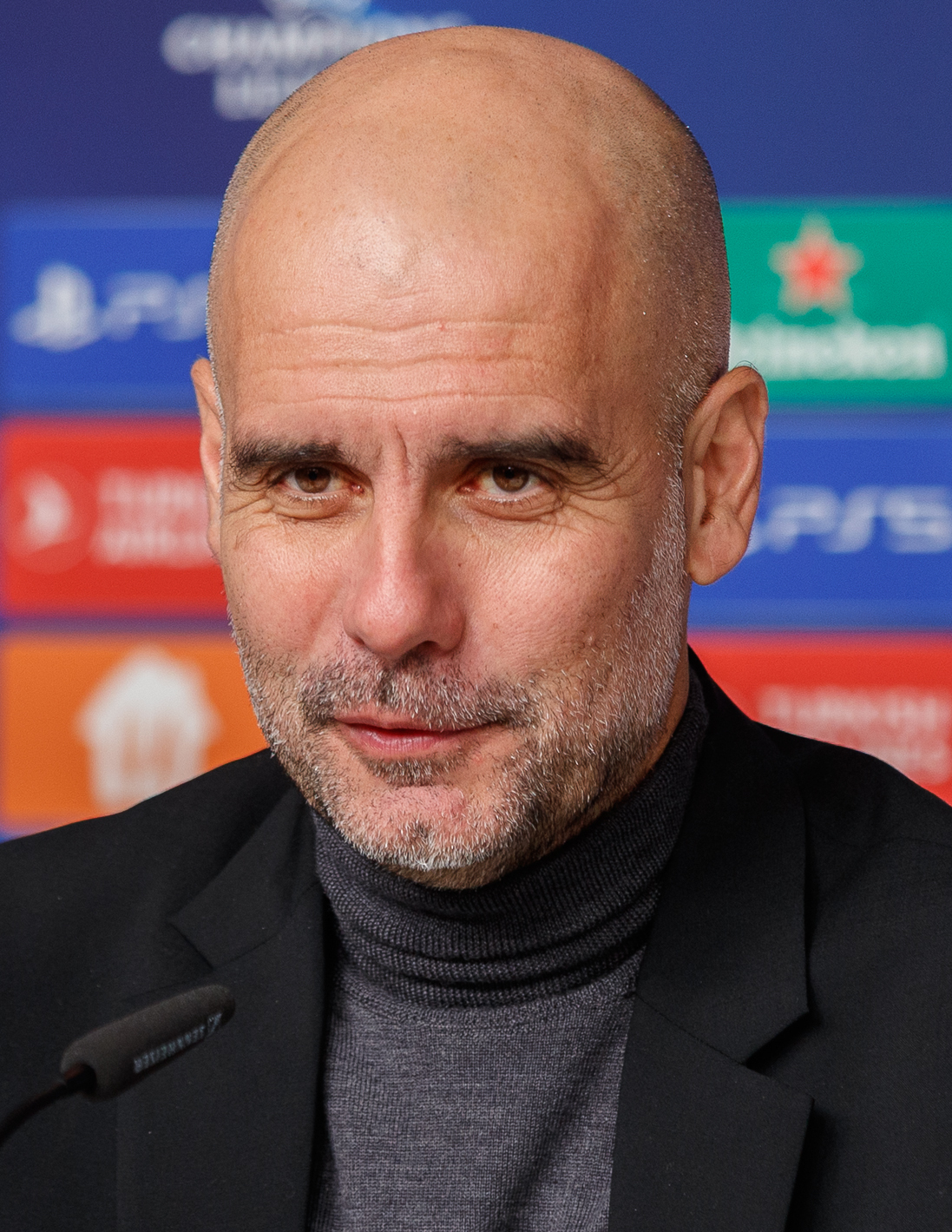
Pep Guardiola is the most successful manager in the club's history with 20 trophies won between 2016 and 2026 and most matches managed (593).

This is a chronological list of Manchester City managers, comprising all those who have held the position of manager for the first team and its predecessors West Gorton (St. Marks) and Ardwick. In the Football League era the club has appointed 47 managers; including pre-league managers and temporary caretakers more than 40 men have held responsibility for team selection. Nine of them have won major silverware.

The longest serving manager was Wilf Wild, who was in charge from 1932 to 1946, for a total length of 14 years and 9 months. However, as Wild's tenure covered the entire length of the Second World War, in which no competitive football was played, he is not the man with the most competitive seasons served as manager. Les McDowall, who was in charge from 1950 to 1963, a period of 13 years, managed the club for the most competitive seasons.

The most successful manager of Manchester City and the manager who took charge of most games was Pep Guardiola, who managed 593 games, and won 20 trophies in his ten years in charge between 2016 and 2026. He is also the leading manager in terms of games won and % of games won.

== History ==
=== Early years (1880s–1950s) ===
Les McDowall was City manager from 1950 to 1963; his tenure of thirteen years makes him the longest-serving manager in Manchester City's history.

In the era before league football, the position of manager involved many secretarial duties, arranging fixtures and the upkeep of the club's ground. Few accounts of the club's off-field affairs in the 1880s survive, and it is unclear who managed the club (then known as West Gorton (St. Marks)) between 1882 and 1884. The club's earliest managers were also players; the first three known managers (Frederick Hopkinson, Edward Kitchen and Walter Chew) all played in West Gorton's first recorded match in 1880. By 1889 the club had moved to Hyde Road and renamed itself Ardwick A.F.C. Under the management of Lawrence Furniss, the club joined the Football League in 1892 as founder members of the Second Division. Furniss became chairman a year later, and he and his successor as secretary-manager Joshua Parlby were responsible for Ardwick reforming as Manchester City F.C. in 1894.

Under Sam Omerod the club achieved promotion to the First Division for the first time, and five years later Tom Maley became the first Manchester City manager to win a major trophy, the 1904 FA Cup. A financial scandal resulted in the Football Association suspending Maley and seventeen players in 1906, leaving Harry Newbould with the task of assembling a makeshift side at short notice. In 1912 Ernest Mangnall joined City from local rivals Manchester United, but was unable to replicate the success he had enjoyed with the Reds. Upon Mangnall's departure in 1924 the roles of secretary and manager were separated, with David Ashworth appointed manager and Wilf Wild as secretary. This arrangement continued during Peter Hodge's time as manager, though the roles merged again when Wild became manager in 1932. Wild became the club's longest serving manager, winning the FA Cup and League Championship during his fourteen-year tenure. By the time Sam Cowan replaced Wild the roles of secretary and manager were separated permanently. Cowan lasted only one season, and was replaced by Jock Thomson. He gained promotion, but did not make a lasting impact at the top level.

=== 1960 to 2000 ===
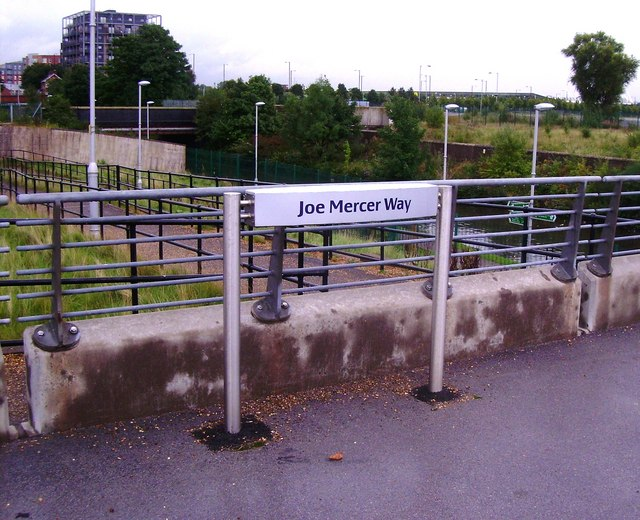
Joe Mercer Way Pathway close to the Etihad Stadium, dedicated to City's then-most successful manager.

Les McDowall became manager in 1950, and managed the Blues for more league seasons than any other manager. Known for his tactical awareness, McDowall's implementation of a system known as the Revie Plan resulted in two FA Cup final appearances, a defeat in 1955 and a victory in 1956. McDowall resigned following relegation in 1963, and his assistant George Poyser became manager. Poyser proved unsuited to the manager's role, and was sacked in 1965. Joe Mercer was appointed, and the club's golden era began. Mercer became the club's most successful manager in terms of trophies won, winning the League Championship, the FA Cup, the League Cup and the European Cup Winners' Cup in his six years at the helm. Over time Mercer's assistant Malcolm Allison sought a progressively larger say in non-coaching matters, and in October 1971 he took sole control of the first team, with Mercer becoming "general manager".

During Peter Swales' time as Manchester City chairman the tenure of managers was frequently brief, as between 1973 and 1994 eleven managers were appointed. The first of these was Ron Saunders, after ill health had forced Johnny Hart to leave the post. Saunders was sacked after only six months, and club stalwart Tony Book took over. Book managed the club for five years, winning the League Cup in 1976. Malcolm Allison, who had rejoined the coaching staff in January 1979, made an ill-fated return to the manager's role later that year, a spell noted more for financial excess than on-pitch success. A further six managers (John Bond, John Benson, Billy McNeill, Jimmy Frizzell, Mel Machin and Howard Kendall) were appointed in the 1980s, with none lasting more than three years amid a series of promotions and relegations. An upturn in results occurred during Peter Reid's management, the club achieving consecutive fifth-place finishes, but a deterioration in Reid's relationship with the board signalled the end of his spell at the club. Brian Horton arrived from Oxford to sceptical newspaper headlines of "Brian Who?", but developed a reputation for attractive football. Swales was replaced as chairman by former City striker Francis Lee. Lee wanted to bring in his own man, and in the 1995 close season he replaced Horton with Alan Ball, whose sole full season resulted in relegation.

In the 1996–97 season, even the turnover rate of the Swales years was surpassed, with five managers (three permanent appointments and two caretakers) taking charge of first team affairs during the course of the season. The third of these was Steve Coppell, the shortest serving manager in the club's history, who resigned on ill health grounds after 32 days as manager. The final of the five, Frank Clark, saw out the season but did not last much longer, losing his job in February 1998 with the club on the brink of relegation to the third tier of English football. Joe Royle was unable to prevent relegation, but subsequently achieved successive promotions to restore top flight status, though relegation a year later resulted in his sacking.

=== 2000–2016, the Thaksin era and the Abu Dhabi era – domestic success ===
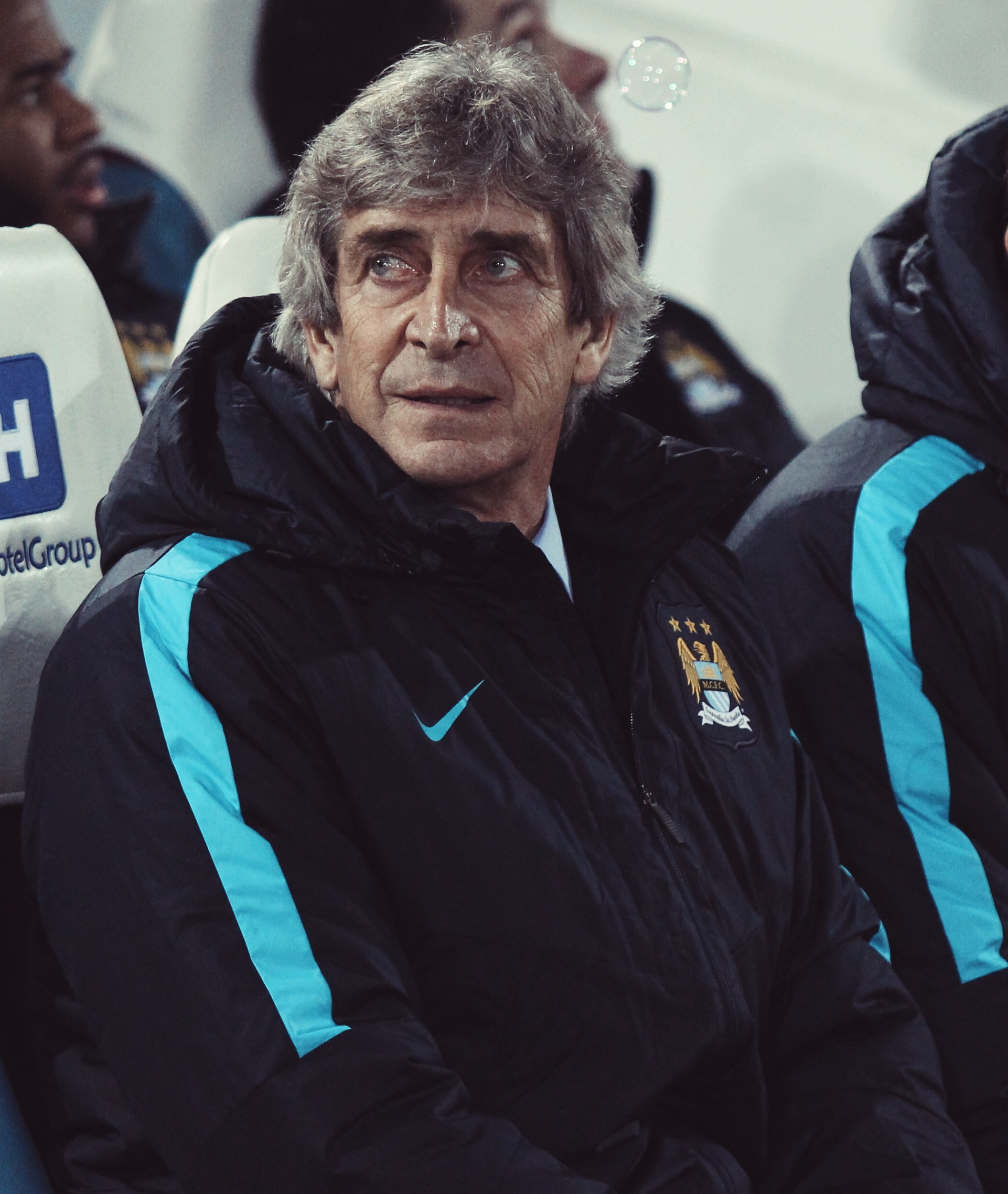
Manuel Pellegrini led City to the semi-finals of the UEFA Champions League for the first time in 2016.

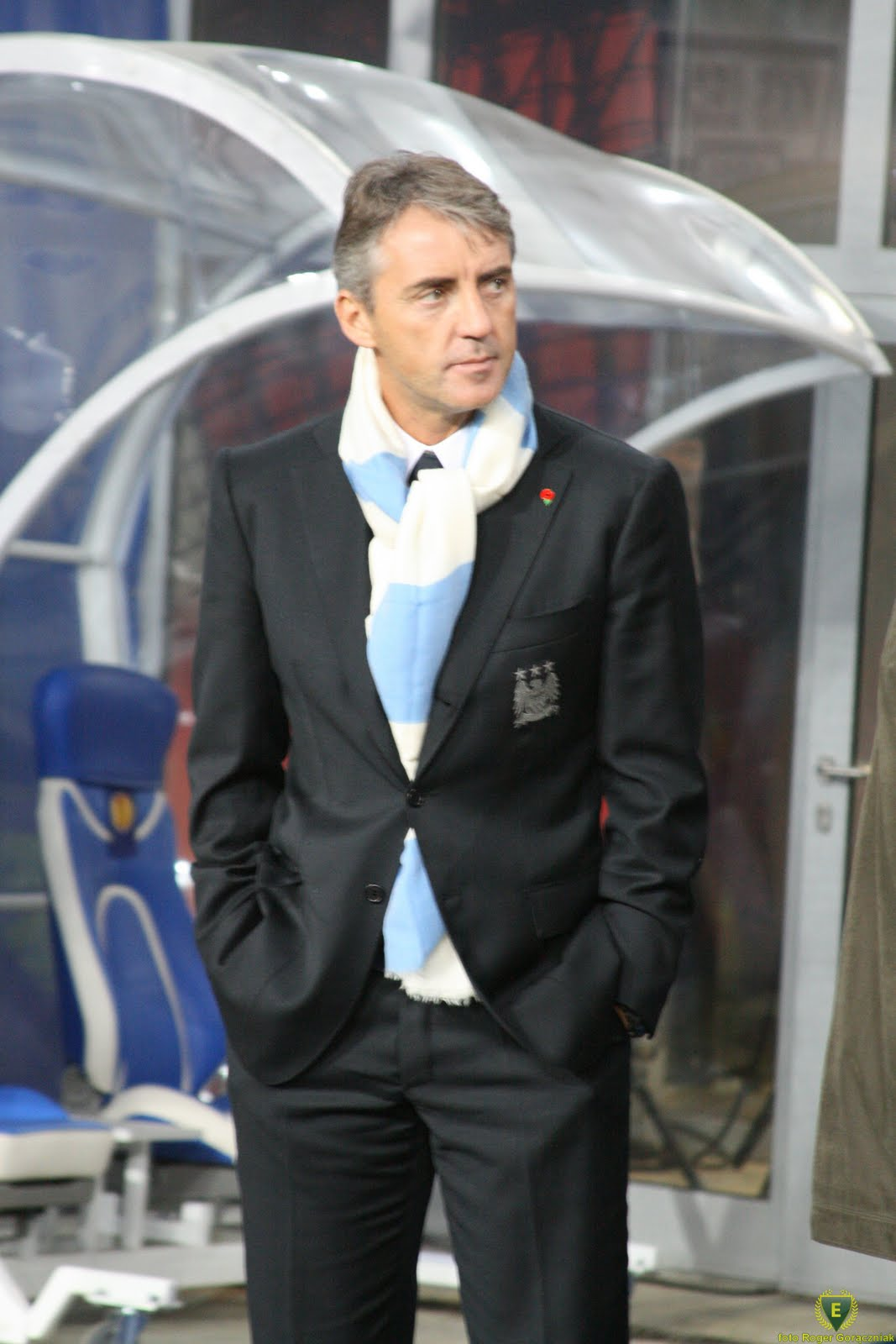
Roberto Mancini led City to league success for the first time in 44 years in 2012.

Under Royle's replacement Kevin Keegan the club changed division for a fifth successive season, setting club records for the number of points gained and goals scored in a season. Keegan remained manager for the club's move to the City of Manchester Stadium and beyond, making him the longest serving manager since Tony Book.

On 6 July 2007, Sven-Göran Eriksson became the first non-British Manchester City manager, replacing the sacked Stuart Pearce, who had served for two years following an initial spell as caretaker. After just one season with the club, Eriksson was replaced by Mark Hughes in June 2008. On 19 December 2009, Mark Hughes was sacked and replaced by Italian Roberto Mancini.

Mancini subsequently became one of the most successful managers of the club in the modern era, and the first to win major domestic trophies since the 1970s. However, after 3 1/2 seasons in charge, Mancini was sacked on 13 May 2013 following defeat in the FA Cup Final versus Wigan Athletic.

On 14 June 2013, Manuel Pellegrini was confirmed as the new manager of the club after signing a 3-year contract and was the third manager, after Roberto Mancini and Brian Kidd (the latter as caretaker), to take charge of City under the ownership of ADUG.

On 1 February 2016, Pellegrini announced that, despite signing a contract extension at the beginning of the 2015–16 season, he would be leaving upon the conclusion of his third season as manager, with his contract ending as originally planned upon his arrival in 2013. He would depart having won the 2013–14 Premier League & two League Cups, in 2013–14 & 2015–16, and also guiding City to its first-ever Champions League semi-final in 2016.

=== 2016–2026, Guardiola era ===
On the same day that Pellegrini announced his planned departure, City confirmed that Pep Guardiola had agreed to succeed him as manager, with his tenure beginning on 1 July 2016. Despite a trophy-less first season in 2016–17, Guardiola would lead City to unprecedented success in the following ten seasons. In 2017–18, City won the Premier League with 100 points, setting countless records along the way whilst also winning the 2017–18 EFL Cup. The following season, the club became the first in the history of English football to complete the domestic treble by winning the Premier League, FA Cup & League Cup. Having won the Community Shield at the start of the season, City became the first team to clinch all four major English domestic honours in one season and to hold all four simultaneously.

In 2022–23, City became only the fifth club to win three successive top-flight titles in England, following Huddersfield Town (1924–26), Arsenal (1933–35), Liverpool (1982–84) and Manchester United, who did it twice under Sir Alex Ferguson (1999-2001 and 2007–09). It was also the third occasion Guardiola had managed to win three league titles in a row, having done so in La Liga with Barcelona from 2009 to 2011 and in the Bundesliga from 2014 to 2016 with Bayern Munich.

On the European stage, Guardiola's first few seasons ended in disappointment with three consecutive quarter-final exits in (2018, 2019, 2020) and the round of 16 elimination in 2017. He then took City to a first Champions League final in 2021, but lost to Chelsea. In 2022, City were dramatically eliminated in the semi-final by Real Madrid, conceding two late goals to lose a 5–3 advantage. Perseverance finally paid off in 2023, as City won their first Champions League title, convincingly beating Real Madrid in the semi-final 5–1 on aggregate and defeating Inter Milan in the final to become only the second English team to complete the continental treble.

Guardiola became Manchester City's most successful manager in the club's history and the manager of most games played, winning 20 major English, continental and worldwide titles. He won more than 400 games and maintained a win percentage in excess of 70%, at least 10% higher than any preceding manager. He announced his resignation from the club at the end of the 2025-26 season.

== Managers ==
As of match played 21 November 2026. Statistics include competitive matches only, pre-Football League and wartime matches are excluded. Cup losses or wins in a penalty shoot-out are counted as draws. Caretakers are shown in italics.

Manager	Nationality	From	To	M	W	D	L	GF	GA	Win %	Honours
Frederick Hopkinson	England	1880	1882	–	–	–	–	–	–	–	–
Jack McGee	Ireland	1882	1884	–	–	–	–	–	–	–	–
Edward Kitchen	England	1884	1887	–	–	–	–	–	–	–	–
Walter Chew	England	1887	1889	–	–	–	–	–	–	–	–
Lawrence Furniss	England	August 1889	May 1893	26	10	4	12	59	46	38.46	–
Joshua Parlby	England	August 1893	May 1895	59	22	5	32	129	146	37.29	–
Sam Ormerod	England	August 1895	July 1902	240	111	50	79	433	354	46.25	1 Second Division title
Tom Maley	Scotland	July 1902	July 1906	150	89	22	39	322	179	59.33	1 Second Division title 1 FA Cup
Harry Newbould	England	July 1906	July 1912	245	93	61	91	390	376	37.96	1 Second Division title
Committee		July 1912	September 1912	2	2	0	0	2	0	100.00	–
Ernest Mangnall	England	9 September 1912	June 1924	350	151	117	82	500	457	43.14	–
David Ashworth	England	July 1924	14 November 1925	59	20	13	26	113	121	33.90	–
Albert Alexander / Committee	England	16 November 1925	26 April 1926	31	13	8	10	80	56	41.94	–
Peter Hodge	Scotland	26 April 1926	12 March 1932	261	122	59	80	579	447	46.74	1 Second Division title
Wilf Wild	England	14 March 1932	1 December 1946	352	158	71	123	703	562	44.89	1 First Division title 1 FA Cup; 1 Charity Shield
Sam Cowan	England	2 December 1946	30 June 1947	30	20	6	4	53	27	66.67	1 Second Division title
Wilf Wild	England	August 1947	November 1947	16	5	5	6	20	18	31.25	–
Jock Thomson	Scotland	November 1947	February 1950	115	35	35	45	122	156	30.43	–
Les McDowall	Scotland	June 1950	May 1963	592	220	127	245	1,049	1,134	37.16	1 FA Cup
George Poyser	England	12 July 1963	April 1965	89	38	17	34	159	137	42.70	–
Committee		April 1965	May 1965	5	1	3	1	4	5	20.00	–
Joe Mercer	England	13 July 1965	7 October 1971	340	149	94	97	518	358	43.82	1 First Division title 1 Second Division title 1 FA Cup; 1 League Cup; 1 Charity Shield; 1 Cup Winners' Cup
Malcolm Allison	England	7 October 1971	30 March 1973	78	32	21	25	119	106	41.03	1 Charity Shield
Johnny Hart	England	30 March 1973	22 October 1973	22	11	5	6	26	22	50.00	–
Tony Book	England	23 October 1973	22 November 1973	7	2	3	2	7	3	28.57	–
Ron Saunders	England	22 November 1973	12 April 1974	29	10	9	10	38	33	34.48	–
Tony Book	England	12 April 1974	July 1979	269	114	75	80	405	309	42.38	1 League Cup
Malcolm Allison	England	16 July 1979	8 October 1980	60	15	20	25	63	95	25.00	–
Tony Book	England	9 October 1980	16 October 1980	1	0	0	1	1	3	0.00	–
John Bond	England	17 October 1980	3 February 1983	123	51	32	40	171	152	41.46	–
John Benson	Scotland	3 February 1983	7 June 1983	17	3	2	12	13	32	17.65	
Billy McNeill	Scotland	30 June 1983	20 September 1986	156	63	42	51	223	183	40.38	–
Jimmy Frizzell	Scotland	21 September 1986	May 1987	42	10	12	20	40	61	23.81	–
Mel Machin	England	May 1987	29 November 1989	130	59	27	44	225	179	45.38	–
Tony Book	England	29 November 1989	5 December 1989	3	0	0	3	4	9	0.00	–
Howard Kendall	England	6 December 1989	5 November 1990	38	13	18	7	46	37	34.21	–
Peter Reid	England	11 November 1990	26 August 1993	136	59	31	46	199	166	43.38	–
Tony Book	England	27 August 1993	27 August 1993	1	0	1	0	1	1	0.00	–
Brian Horton	England	28 August 1993	16 May 1995	96	29	33	34	118	130	30.21	–
Alan Ball	England	30 June 1995	26 August 1996	49	13	14	22	49	70	26.53	–
Asa Hartford	Scotland	26 August 1996	7 October 1996	8	3	0	5	8	13	37.50	–
Steve Coppell	England	7 October 1996	8 November 1996	6	2	1	3	7	10	33.33	–
Phil Neal	England	9 November 1996	28 December 1996	10	2	1	7	11	19	20.00	–
Frank Clark	England	29 December 1996	17 February 1998	59	20	17	22	73	60	33.90	–
Joe Royle	England	18 February 1998	21 May 2001	171	74	46	51	261	192	43.27	1 Second Division play-off
Kevin Keegan	England	24 May 2001	11 March 2005	176	77	39	60	299	223	43.75	1 First Division title
Stuart Pearce	England	21 March 2005	14 May 2007	96	34	19	43	103	111	35.42	–
Sven-Göran Eriksson	Sweden	6 July 2007	2 June 2008	45	19	11	15	51	58	42.22	–
Mark Hughes	Wales	4 June 2008	19 December 2009	77	36	15	26	129	101	46.75	–
Roberto Mancini	Italy	19 December 2009	13 May 2013	191	113	38	40	360	173	59.16	1 Premier League title 1 FA Cup; 1 Community Shield
Brian Kidd	England	13 May 2013	14 June 2013	2	1	0	1	4	3	50.00	–
Manuel Pellegrini	Chile	14 June 2013	30 June 2016	167	100	28	39	373	177	59.88	1 Premier League title 2 League Cups
Pep Guardiola	Spain	1 July 2016	24 May 2026	593	416	87	90	1,423	522	70.15	6 Premier League titles 3 FA Cups; 5 League Cups; 3 Community Shields; 1 UEFA Champions League title 1 UEFA Super Cup; 1 FIFA Club World Cup
Enzo Maresca	Italy	29 June 2026	present	18	11	2	5	41	26	61.11	–

== Most trophies won ==
As of 16 May 2026

Name	FD/PL	FAC	LC	CS	UEFA/FIFA	Total
(Spain) Pep Guardiola	6	3	5	3	3	20
(England) Joe Mercer	1	1	1	1	1	5
(Chile) Manuel Pellegrini	1	0	2	0	0	3
(Italy) Roberto Mancini	1	1	0	1	0	3
(England) Wilf Wild	1	1	0	1	0	3
(Scotland) Les McDowall	0	1	0	0	0	1
(Scotland) Tom Maley	0	1	0	0	0	1
(England) Tony Book	0	0	1	0	0	1
(England) Malcolm Allison	0	0	0	1	0	1
Total	10	8	9	7	4	38
