= El Mirador de Montserrat =

el Mirador de Montserrat
- Singular population entity
- Location within Spain Location within Catalonia Location within Province of Barcelona
- Coordinates: 41°47′16.6″N 1°49′35.6″E
- Country: Spain
- A. community: Catalunya
- Province: Barcelona
- Municipality: Santpedor

Population (January 1, 2024)
  - Total: 528
- Time zone: UTC+01:00
- Postal code: 08251
- MCN: 08192000200

el Mirador de Montserrat is a singular population entity in the municipality of Santpedor, in Catalonia, Spain.

As of 2024, it has a population of 528 people.
