= Anna Balletbò =

Spanish academic and politician (1943–2025)

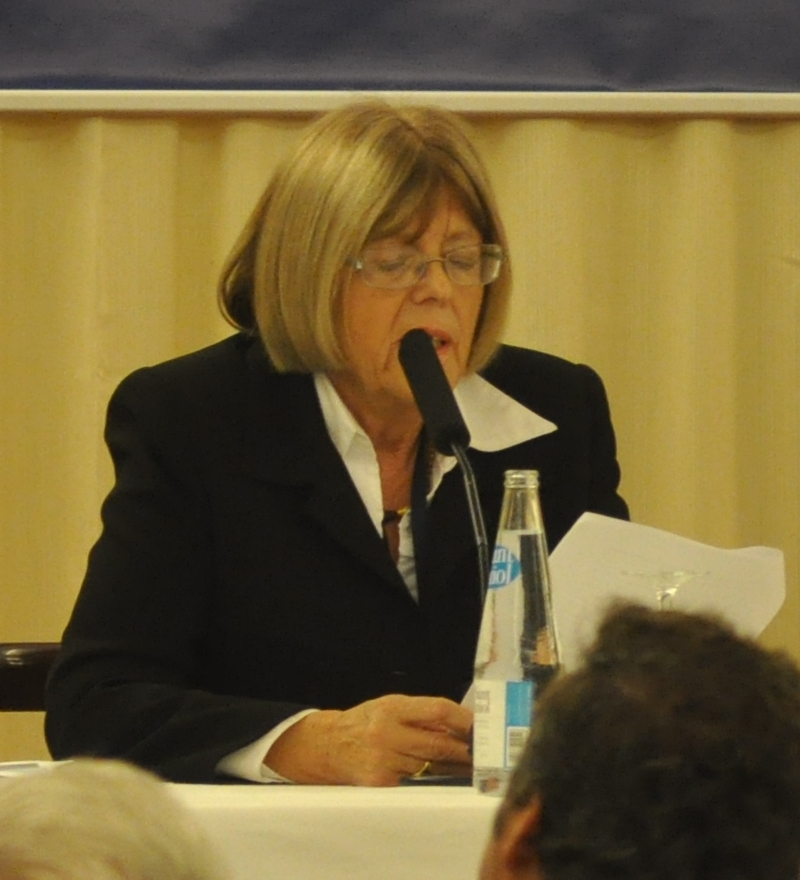
- Balletbò in 2011

Member of the Congress of Deputies
- In office 1979–2000
- Constituency: Barcelona

Personal details
- Born: 15 December 1943 Santpedor, Catalonia, Spain
- Died: 24 October 2025 (aged 81)
- Party: Socialist Party of Catalonia
- Education: University of Barcelona; Autonomous University of Barcelona
- Profession: Academic

Anna Balletbò i Puig (15 December 1943 – 24 October 2025) was a Spanish academic, journalist and politician. She was a member of the Socialist Party of Catalonia. Balletbò was the first person released after the kidnapping of the Congress of Deputies during the 1981 Spanish coup attempt, and the first civilian to speak directly to King Juan Carlos I about what was happening inside the parliament building that day.

== Early life and education ==
Balletbò was born in Santpedor, Catalonia, on 15 December 1943. Her aunt was the grandmother of football manager Pep Guardiola.

Balletbò attended a boarding school in England where she studied the English language. She attended a journalism institute in Spain. She graduated from the University of Barcelona with a degree in educational sciences. She also obtained a degree in modern history and communication sciences from the Autonomous University of Barcelona.

== Career ==
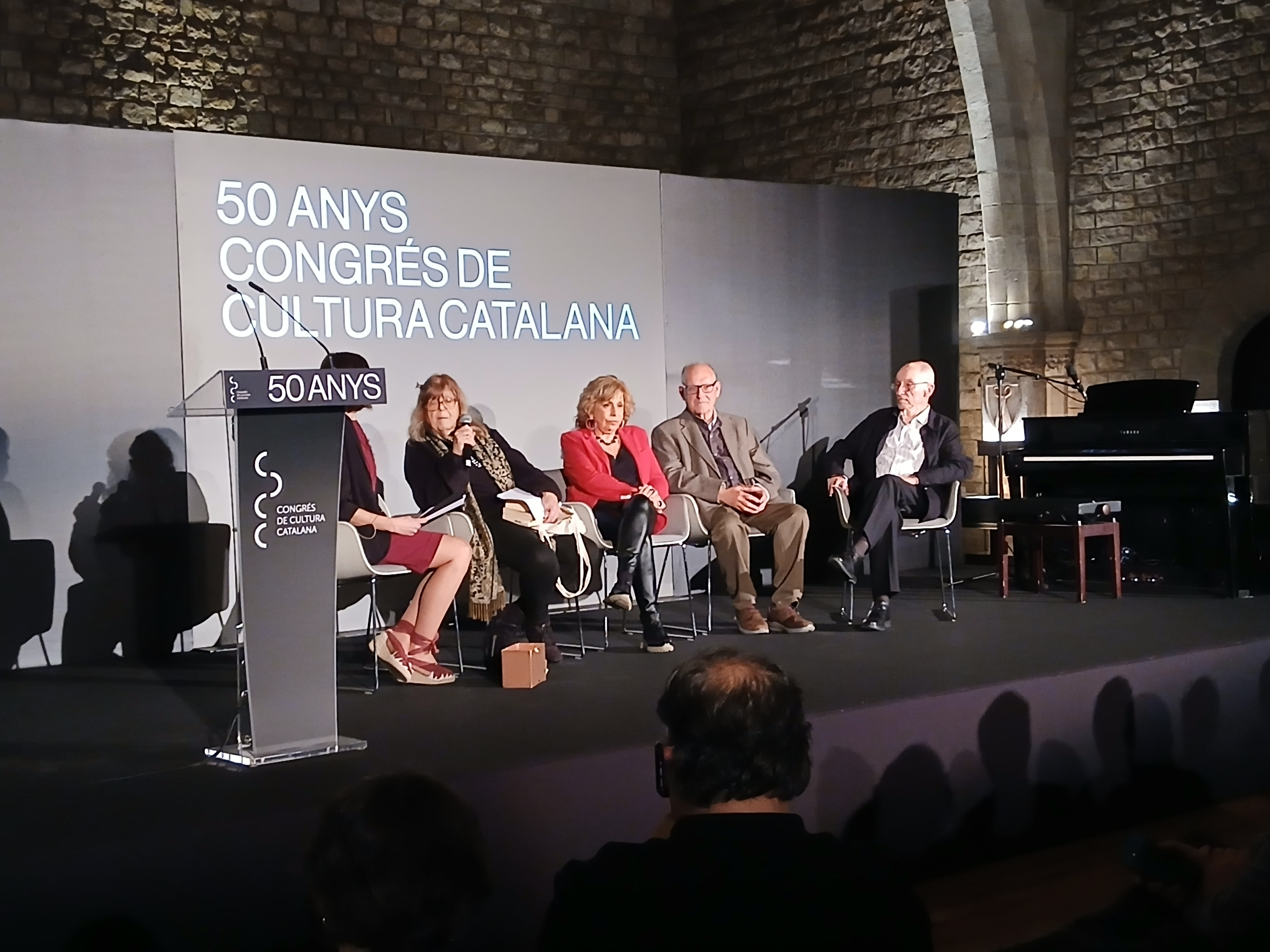
Balletbò (fourth from right) in March 2025

Following her graduation, Balletbò worked as a pre-school teacher for seven years. Then she started her journalistic career as a regular contributor to the newspaper El Correo Catalán. She subsequently worked for the BBC.

Balletbò joined the Socialist Convergence of Catalonia in the 1970s and became one of the founders of the Socialist Party of Catalonia (PSC). In 1976, she took part in the first PSC rally at Palau Blaugrana.

In 1979 Balletbò was elected as a deputy from the Barcelona constituency. Her tenure at the Congress of Deputies ended in 2000.

On 23 February 1981, 200 armed Civil Guards led by Antonio Tejero stormed the Congress of Deputies during the investiture debate of Leopoldo Calvo-Sotelo. After 40 minutes, the soldiers saw her, pregnant with twins at the time, and agreed to release her. The first thing she did after her release was call her family and the President of the Generalitat of Catalonia, Jordi Pujol, to ask for King Juan Carlos I's telephone number. The king asked her how many assailants there were and what their ranks were, and she informed him that Tejero was possibly responsible, as another deputy, Julio Busquets, had told her while they were crouching down. Balletbò acknowledged years later that, when the attackers began shooting at the ceiling, she thought they were "killing (the lawmakers and the government) in rows".

Balletbò worked as a faculty member at the Autonomous University of Barcelona from 1975 and became a professor at the Faculty of Information Sciences. She was part of the Woodrow Wilson International Center for Scholars. She was also a co-founder of the Olof Palme International Foundation which was established in Barcelona in 1989. Balletbò was the head of the organization until her death in 2025.

Balletbò published various books and articles.

Between 2000 and 2007, she was a member of the board of RTVE and of the Corporació Catalana de Mitjans Audiovisuals between 2008 and 2012.

== Death ==
Balletbò died on 24 October 2025, at the age of 81. President of Catalonia Salvador Illa, also from the PSC, expressed his "shock" at the death of "a great, brave public servant and defender of socialist values when it was most difficult and necessary".

== Awards ==
- Order of the Polar Star (Sweden, 1985)
- Creu de Sant Jordi (Catalonia, 2006)
- Golden Medal for Civil Merit, posthumous (City Council of Barcelona, 2025)
