= Santpedor =

- Municipality
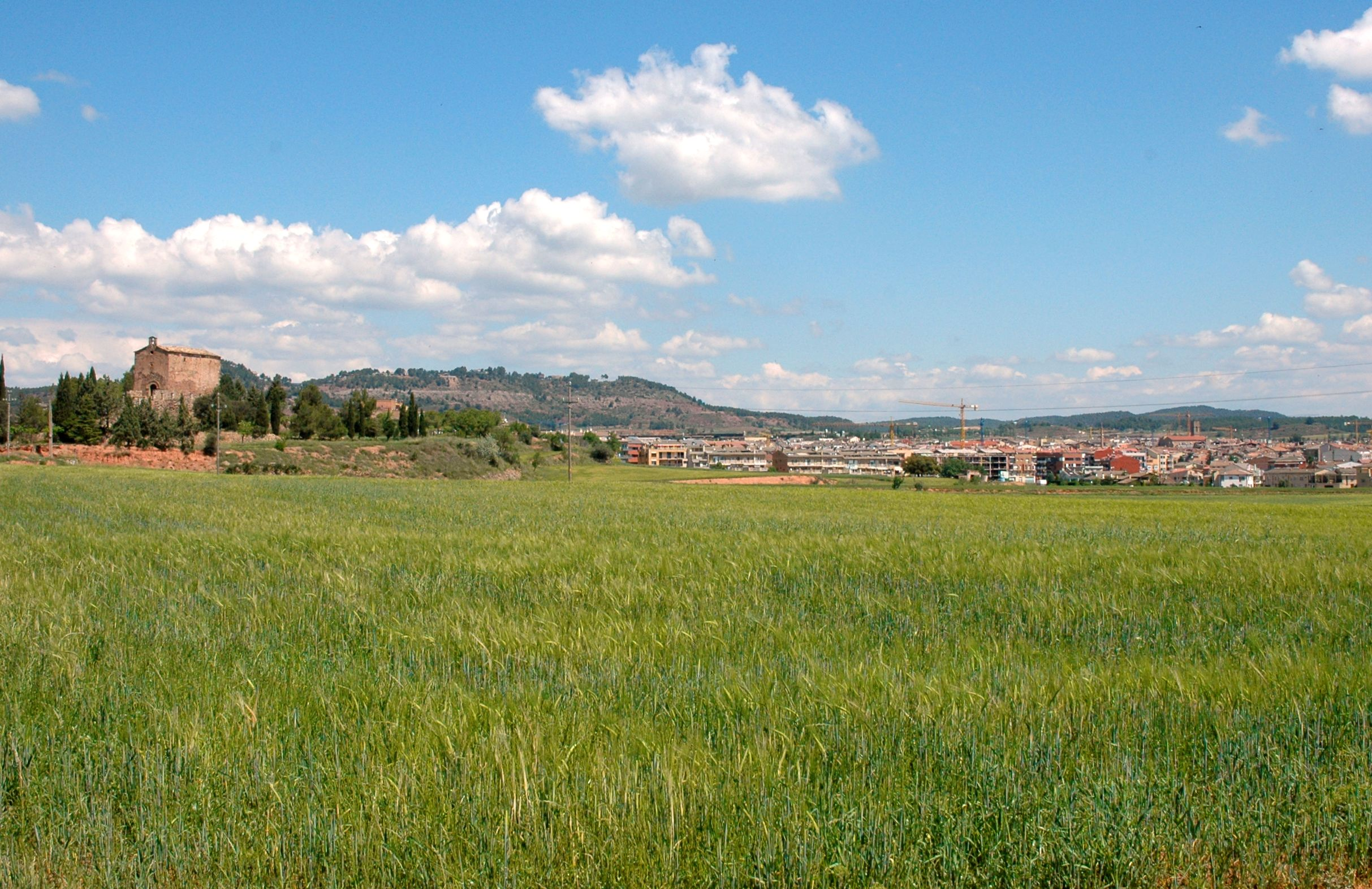
- View of Santpedor, with the Hermitage of St. Francis on the left.

- Flag Coat of arms

- Location in Catalonia Santpedor (Catalonia) Santpedor (Spain)
- Coordinates: 41°47′1″N 1°50′21″E
- Country: Spain
- Community: Catalonia
- Province: Barcelona
- Comarca: Bages

Government
  - Mayor: Xavier Codina Casas (2015) (ERC)

Area
  - Total: 16.6 km^{2} (6.4 sq mi)
- Elevation: 336 m (1,102 ft)

Population (2025-01-01)
  - Total: 7,744
  - Density: 467/km^{2} (1,210/sq mi)
- Demonym: Santpedorenc
- Postal code: 08192
- Website: santpedor.cat

Santpedor (Catalan pronunciation: [ˌsampəˈðo]) is a municipality and town in the comarca of Bages, Catalonia. It is located north of Manresa, the flattest sector of Bages. Sights include the Romanesque-Gothic church of St. Peter, and the Hermitage of St. Francis. It is the birthplace of football manager Pep Guardiola and politician Anna Balletbò.

In addition to the main namesake population center, the municipality also contains the population entity of El Mirador de Montserrat.
