= The World Cup: A Captain's Tale =

- Genre: Sports Drama
- Written by: Neville Smith
- Directed by: Tom Clegg
- Starring: Dennis Waterman; Andrew Keir; Marjorie Bland; Nigel Hawthorne; Tim Healy
- Country of origin: United Kingdom
- Original language: English

Production
- Producer: Laurie Greenwood
- Running time: 90 minutes
- Production company: Tyne Tees Television

Original release
- Network: ITV
- Release: 14 June 1982

The World Cup: A Captain's Tale is a 1982 British television sports film directed by Tom Clegg and starring Dennis Waterman, Andrew Keir, Marjorie Bland, Nigel Hawthorne and Tim Healy. The film depicts the story of West Auckland F.C. a team of part-time players who represented England in the Sir Thomas Lipton Trophy, sometimes described as the "First World Cup", in 1909 and 1911. Some of the process behind filming is mentioned in a Dennis Waterman tribute issued by The Minder Podcast in 2022.

== Cast ==
- Andrew Keir as Sir Thomas Lipton
- Richard Griffiths as Sidney Barron
- Dennis Waterman as Bob Jones
- Nigel Hawthorne as John Westwood
- Marjorie Bland as Edie Jones
- Jeremy Bulloch as Ben Tillet Whittingham
- Dai Bradley as Ticer Thomas
- Tim Healy as Charlie Hogg
- Ken Hutchison as Jimmy Dickenson
- Rod Culbertson as Rob Gill
- Struan Rodger as Jack Greenwell
- Lloyd McGuire as Tom Gill
- Jimmy Yuill (uncredited)
