= Joshua Parlby =

English football manager (1855–?)

Joshua Parlby (1855 in Longton, Staffordshire – ?) was an English football manager who managed Manchester City in the 1890s.

Details of Parlby's life before he moved to Manchester are unclear, though some sources indicate he played for Stoke in the pre-professional era. Parlby moved to Manchester to run a public house. His links with the brewing trade led to a role on the committee of Ardwick Association Football Club, who used a public house, the Hyde Road Hotel, as their headquarters. Parlby advocated employing a full-time secretary-manager, and in 1893 became the club's first paid secretary. A larger than life character, Parlby had a reputation for wrangling the club out of financial trouble by whatever means possible. Contemporary accounts tell of him sneaking players onto trains when the club struggled to afford travel expenses for away matches

At the end of Parlby's first season as manager Ardwick finished thirteenth in the Second Division, and were required to seek re-election to the league. Believing the club needed to establish an identity capable of appealing to all Mancunians, Parlby was an influential figure in the reformation of Ardwick as Manchester City in 1894, and the subsequent success in achieving re-election to the league.

Parlby managed the club for one more season, in which they finished ninth. He returned to the pub trade in 1895, but retained a role on the club committee for several years.
