= Miles Barron =

English football manager

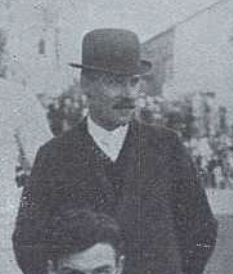
- Barron with the West Auckland team in Barcelona in 1912

Personal information
- Date of birth: 1871
- Place of birth: Waterhouses, County Durham, England
- Date of death: 9 September 1924 (aged 52–53)

Managerial career
- Years: Team
- West Auckland
- 1912: Barcelona

Miles Coverdale Stocks (Note: also possibly Slater or Sidney) Barron (1871 – 9 September 1924) was an English football administrator and manager.

== Personal life ==
Miles Barron was born in 1871 in Waterhouses, a borough located to the west of the city of Durham. The exact date of birth is not known, but he was registered in the civil registry of Durham between July and September of that year. Barron, the eldest of four children, was born to John Barron (1840–1915), a colliery manager from Durham, and Grace Stocks (1841–1913).

As a young man, Barron was an employee of Pease and Partners Ltd, the same company for which his father worked. Barron married Mary Ann Bird in 1893, and they initially settled in the town of Lynesack and later in St Helen Auckland, both near West Auckland. They had five children. Barron was a freemason member of the United Grand Lodge of England from 1905.

== Career ==
A surveyor by trade, Barron, who never played senior football, served as club secretary for several football clubs in the North East of his native England, notably organizing trips to face European opposition. Most notable of these European trips was with West Auckland Football Club, an amateur team made up of coalminers from County Durham, who defeated Swiss opposition FC Winterthur in 1909 to claim the inaugural Sir Thomas Lipton Trophy. These events were later dramatized in the 1982 television movie, The World Cup: A Captain's Tale, with Barron being portrayed by Richard Griffiths. However, despite beating Italian side Juventus two years later to win the competition again, the club met with financial hardship and were forced to disband.

These exploits in Europe caught the eye of Barcelona president Joan Gamper, who invited Barron to become head coach of Barcelona in 1912. Barron accepted and was therefore appointed as manager upon his arrival. Between September and December 1912, Barron managed Barcelona in twelve friendly matches, and also refereed two of them. After having coached the team in local matches for several months, he was tasked with assembling a squad of British players for Barcelona to test its strength in their Christmas friendlies. The British team he brought over, known as the West Auckland Wanderers, was composed of numerous members of the West Auckland side that had won two Sir Thomas Lipton Trophy titles under Barron.

The sides faced off three times at the Camp de la Indústria, with the results being one win for each and one draw. They played their first game on Christmas Day of 1912: a 3–3 draw, in which Barcelona's goals were scored by two British players, Alex Steel and Frank Allack. The second game resulted in a 4–0 loss for Barcelona, but in the final fixture, played on 29 December, Steel scored two goals in a 2–0 victory for the Catalan club. Following this, Gamper attempted to persuade Barron to continue as head coach, an offer which Barron declined in order to return to his family; he resumed his previous career as a surveyor.

Despite leaving Barcelona, his impact was longer-lasting: the visiting West Auckland squad included goalkeeper Jack Alderson, who replaced Barron as coach. Former West Auckland player, and friend of Barron, Jack Greenwell, who had joined Barcelona as a player at the same time as Barron's arrival, also decided to stay in Barcelona after those friendlies and went on to replace Alderson and manage the side for two separate spells.

In Spanish newspapers, Barron's name was rendered incorrectly more often than not, with various different spellings, though football historians have identified them as him. Incorrectly named "B. Barren" on Barcelona's official website (and earlier as "John Barrow"), he is listed as the club's second official coach, after Billy Lambe, who had served as player-manager earlier in 1912, although Barren was the first one to be specifically contracted by Barça as a full-time manager.

== Later life and death ==
Barron would not remain in football, and with the onset of the First World War in 1914, he and his son Percy were commissioned into the Royal Engineers, serving in the Salonika campaign, where he contracted malaria. The disease affected most of his later life, and he eventually succumbed to it, dying on 9 September 1924, at the age of 52.
