= Billy Lambe =

English footballer (1877–1951)

Personal information
- Full name: William Charles Lambe
- Date of birth: 2 January 1877
- Place of birth: London, England
- Date of death: 24 August 1951 (aged 74)
- Place of death: St. Leonards-on-Sea, England
- Position: Midfielder

Senior career*
Years	Team	Apps	(Gls)
- Swanscome Tigers
1906–1908	Hastings & St Leonards United		
- Woolwich Arsenal
1910–1911	Brighton & Hove Albion		
1911–1912	Tunbridge Wells Rangers		
1912	Barcelona	4	(0)

Managerial career
- 1912: Barcelona (player-coach)
- * Club domestic league appearances and goals

William Charles Lambe (2 January 1877 – 24 August 1951) was an English footballer who played as a midfielder.

Before joining Barcelona in early 1912, Lambe had previously played for Swanscome Tigers, Hastings & St Leonards United, Woolwich Arsenal, Brighton & Hove Albion and Tunbridge Wells Rangers. At Barcelona, he became the first foreigner to be paid a wage at the club, due to his role as a player-coach. He made fourteen appearances for the club (with four of them in official matches), and also won the Copa del Rey and the Pyrenees Cup. However, his time as player-coach was short-lived, as club president Joan Gamper preferred to appoint a full-time manager and administrator to run the team's affairs off the pitch, rather than entrusting duties to a player. He was succeeded by Miles Barron, who is considered the club's first official manager. In August 1939, Lambe was appointed as the manager of Hastings & St Leonards, then of the Southern Amateur League, initially on a month's trial. His record with the club is not known due to the outbreak of World War II, which led to the league being suspended and allowing the club to rejoin the Sussex County League.
