= Josep Mussons =

Spanish businessman and sports executive (1925–2021)

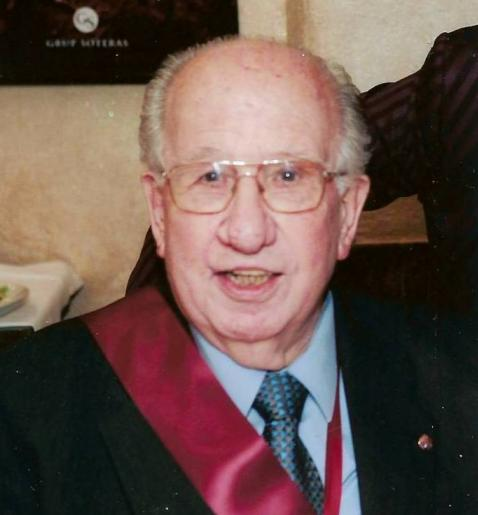
- Born: Josep Mussons i Mata; 15 July 1925; Igualada, Spain
- Died: 17 April 2021 (aged 95); Barcelona, Spain
- Education: ESADE
- Occupation: businessman

Josep Mussons i Mata (15 July 1925 – 17 April 2021) was a Spanish businessman and sports executive, vice-president of FC Barcelona between 1978 and 2000 and one of the fathers of La Masia.

== Biography and career ==
He was born in Igualada, Spain. Mussons was a member of the board of directors of Fútbol Club Barcelona from 1978 to 2000. He was President of the Sports Sections from 1978 to 1979. He was one of the main managers of La Masia. He retired in 1995 and became Honorary President of FC Barcelona in 2000.

== Death ==
Mussons died on 17 April 2021, at the age of 95 after suffering from COVID-19.
