= History of FC Barcelona =

Spanish football club history

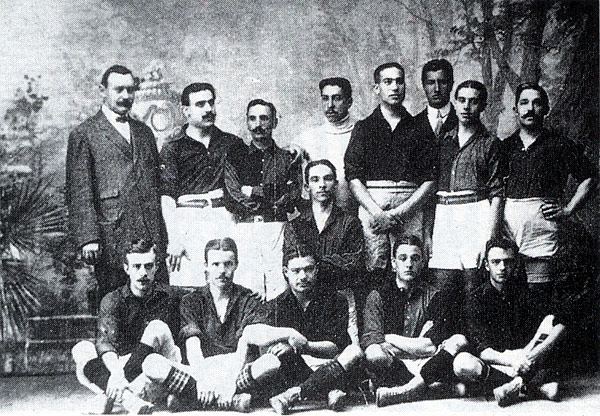
Barcelona team that won their first Copa del Rey in 1910.

The history of Futbol Club Barcelona begins from the football club's founding in 1899 up until the present day. FC Barcelona, also known simply as Barcelona and familiarly as Barça, is based in Barcelona, Catalonia, Spain. The club was founded in 1899 by a group of Swiss, Catalan, German, and English footballers led by Joan Gamper. The club played amateur football until 1910 in various regional competitions. In 1910, the club participated in their first of many European competitions, and has since amassed fourteen UEFA trophies and a sextuple. In 1928, Barcelona co-founded La Liga, the top-tier in Spanish football, along with a string of other clubs. As of 2026, Barcelona has never been relegated from La Liga, a record they share with Athletic Bilbao and arch-rival Real Madrid.

The history of Barcelona has often been political. Though it was a club created and run by foreigners, Barcelona gradually became a club associated with Catalan values. In Spain's transition to autocracy in 1925, Catalonia became increasingly hostile towards the central government in Madrid. The hostility enhanced Barcelona's image as a focal point for Catalonism, and when Francisco Franco banned the use of the Catalan language, the stadium of Barcelona became one of the few places the people could express their dissatisfaction. The Spanish transition to democracy in 1978 has not dampened the club's image of Catalan pride. In the 2000s and 2010s – a period of sporting success in the club and an increased focus on Catalan players – club officials have been openly faithful to historic club commitment to the defense of the country, democracy, freedom of expression and the right to decide, and have condemned any action that may impede the full exercise of these rights.

== Beginnings of Football Club Barcelona (1899–1922) ==
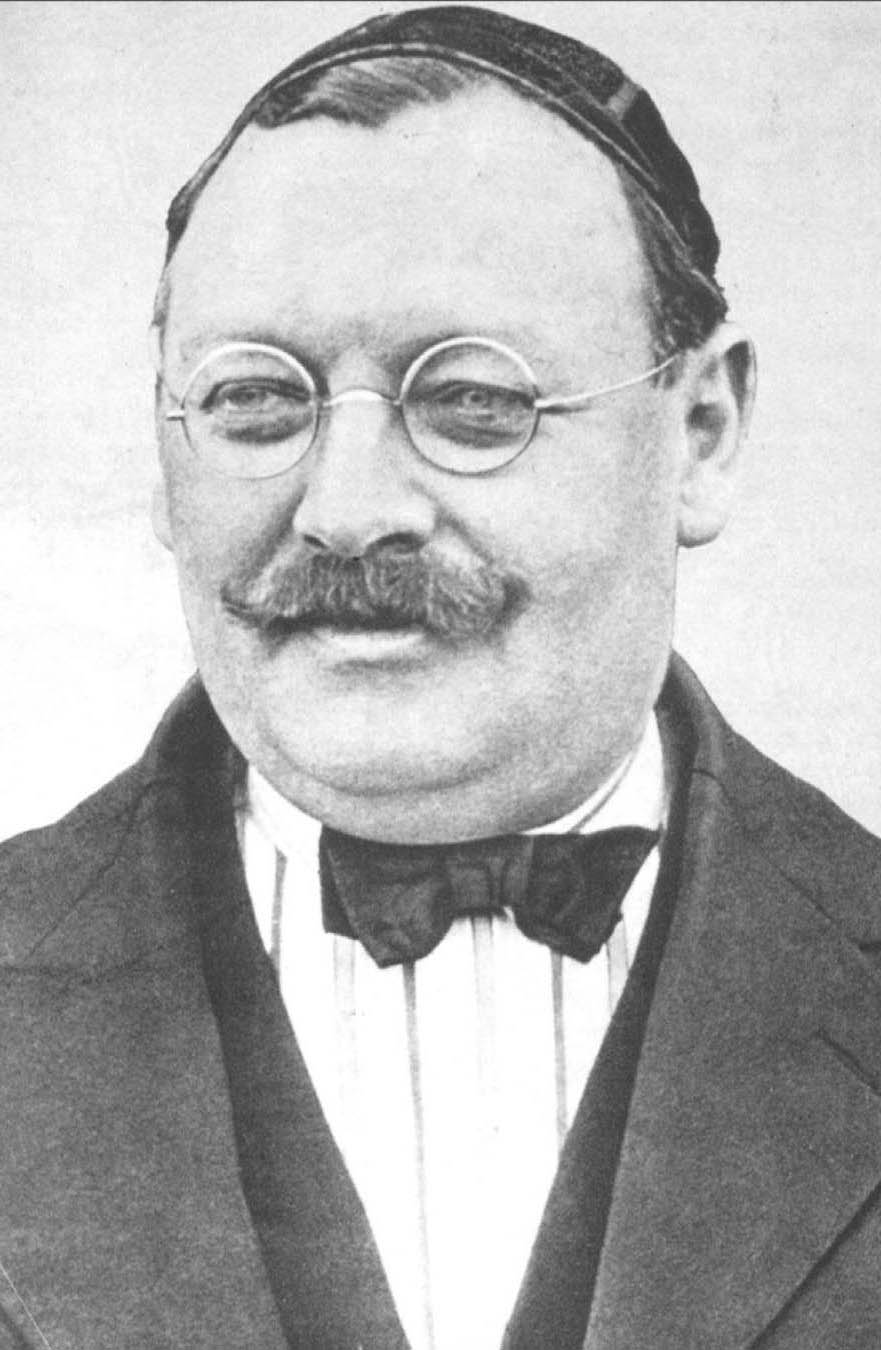
Joan Gamper laid the foundation of FC Barcelona.

On 22 October 1899, the Swiss Joan Gamper placed an advertisement in Los Deportes declaring his wish to form a football club; a positive response resulted in a meeting at the Gimnasio Solé on 29 November 1899. Eleven players attended: Walter Wild (the first president of the club), Luis de Ossó, Bartomeu Terradas, Otto Kunzle, Otto Maier, Enric Ducal, Pere Cabot, Josep Llobet, John Parsons, and William Parsons. As a result, Football Club Barcelona was born. The blue and red colours of the shirt were first worn in a match against Hispania in 1900. The prevailing Catalonia theory, endorsed by the club, is that the colours were taken from the rugby team of Merchant Taylors' Boys' School, Crosby. The school was attended by brothers Arthur Witty and Ernest Witty, two Anglo-Spanish players heavily involved in Barça's formative years.

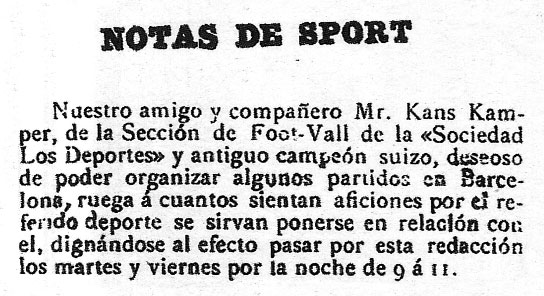
Gamper's advertisement in Los Deportes, requesting players for the team that later became the Futbol Club Barcelona.

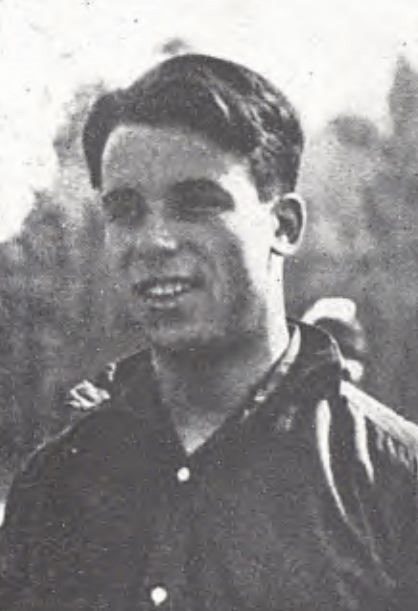
Josep Samitier, one of the earliest and biggest Barça legends, played for the club from 1919 to 1932.

FC Barcelona quickly emerged as one of the leading clubs in Spain, competing in the Campeonat de Cataluña and the Copa del Rey. In 1902, the club won its first trophy, the Copa Macaya in 1901–02, and also played in the first Copa del Rey final, losing 2–1 to Bizcaya.

In 1906, Juli Marial became the 6th President of FC Barcelona and had to steer the club through difficult times in both social and sporting terms, as the club lost a third of its members during his presidency, as well as a large part of its more veteran players who had retired, most of which being the founding members such as Gamper, Witty, Ossó and Parsons, who had been the pillars of the team since its foundation. However, his period in charge of the club also coincided with a major restructuring of the team, and during his tenure, several footballers arrived at the club who would later form the first great team of Barcelona, such as Paco Bru, Charles Wallace and Enrique Peris from FC Internacional in 1906, and the Massana brothers (Santiago and Alfredo), José Irízar and José Berdié from X Sporting Club in 1908. When Marial left, the club was in decline, and it looked like its days were numbered.

In 1908, Joan Gamper took over the presidency because the club was on the verge of bankruptcy, in part because the club had not won anything since the Campeonat de Cataluña in 1905, thus causing their financial trouble. One of his main achievements was to help Barcelona acquire its own stadium and thus achieve a stable income.

On 14 March 1909, the team moved into the Camp de la Indústria, a stadium with a capacity of 8,000. To celebrate their new surroundings, a logo contest was held the following year. Carles Comamala won the contest, and his suggestion became the crest that the club still wears as of 2022, with some minor changes.

The stadium is regarded as the main element that helped the club grow in the 1910s and become a dominant team, winning three successive Campionats de Catalunya between 1909 and 1911, three Copa del del Rey in four years between 1910 and 1913, and four successive Pyrenees Cup between the inaugural year in 1910 and 1913, which was one of the earliest international club cups in Europe since it consisted of the best teams of Languedoc, Midi and Aquitaine (Southern France), the Basque Country and Catalonia; all were former members of the Marca Hispanica region. The contest was the most prestigious in that era. As well as the aforementioned players acquired in the Marial presidency, Barça's first great team also had the likes of Amechazurra, Romà Forns, Pepe Rodríguez, Carles Comamala, and Jack Greenwell. The latter became the club's first full-time coach in 1917.

During the same period, the club changed its official language from Castilian to Catalan and gradually evolved into an important symbol of Catalan identity. For many fans, participating in the club had less to do with the game itself and more with being a part of the club's collective identity. On 1 January 1913, under the presidency of Gamper, the club admitted its first-ever female as a member, the 28-year-old Edelmira Calvetó, thus becoming the first club in Spain to open its doors to women, seven years ahead of RCD Espanyol taking the same step in 1920 and of Real Madrid and Sporting de Gijón in 1924. On 4 February 1917, the club held its first testimonial match to honour Ramón Torralba who played from 1913 to 1928. The match was against local side Terrassa, which Barcelona won 6–2.

Gamper simultaneously launched a campaign to recruit more club-members, and, by 1922, the club had more than 20,000, who helped finance a new stadium. The club then moved to the new Les Cortes, which they inaugurated the same year. Les Cortes had an initial capacity of 22,000, and was later expanded to 60,000.

Gamper recruited Jack Greenwell as the first full-time manager in Barcelona's history. After he was hired, the club's fortunes began to improve on the field. During the Gamper-led era, Barcelona won eleven Campeonat de Cataluña, six Copa del Rey and four Pyrenees Cups and enjoyed its first "golden age".

== Rivera, Republic and Civil War (1923–1957) ==
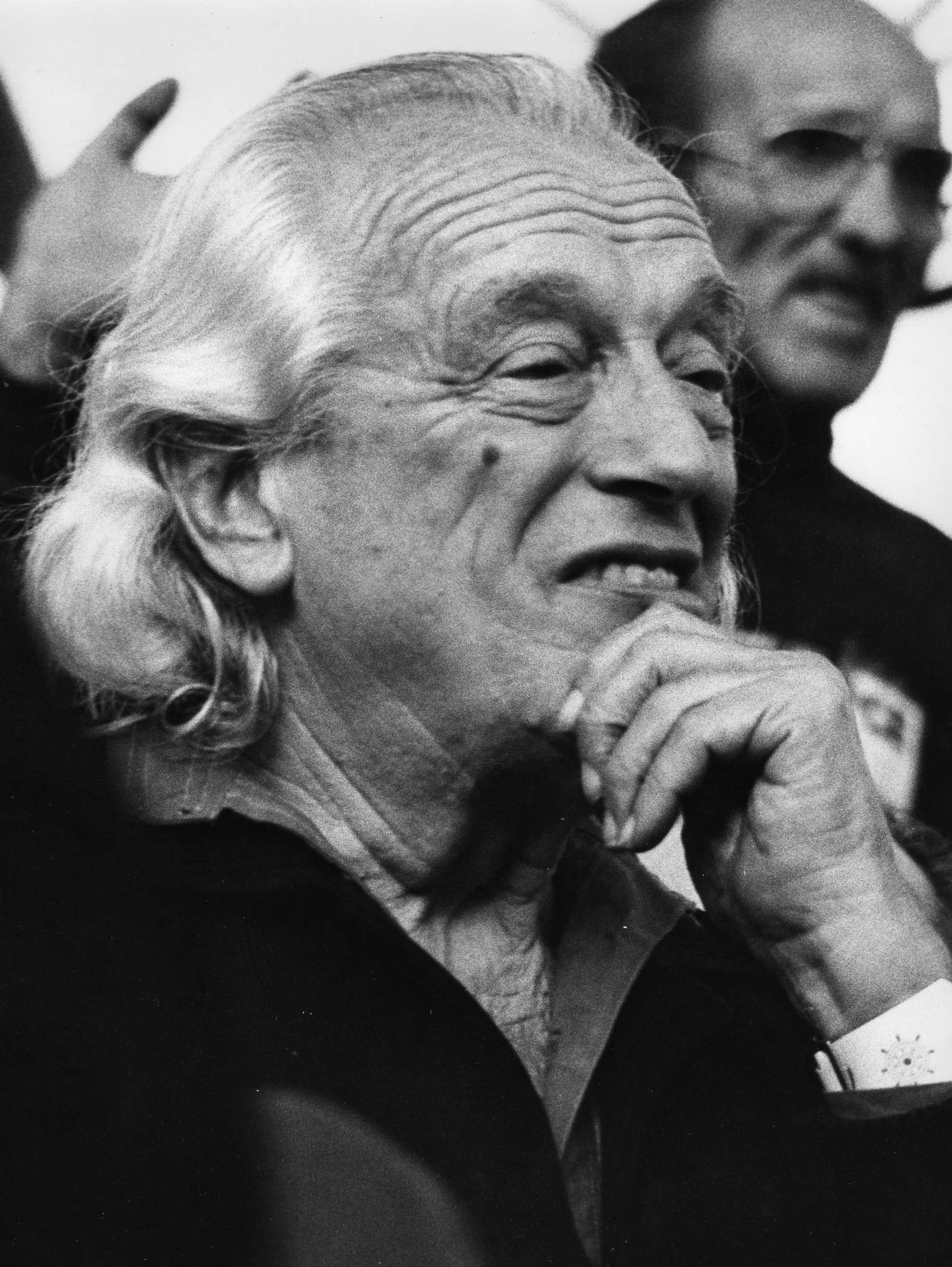
Poet Rafael Alberti wrote a poem hailing the Barcelona goalkeeper Franz Platko.

On 14 June 1925, in a spontaneous reaction against Primo de Rivera's dictatorship, the crowd in the stadium jeered the Royal March. As a reprisal, the ground was closed for six months and Gamper was forced to relinquish the presidency of the club. This coincided with the transition to professional football, and, in 1926, the directors of Barcelona publicly claimed, for the first time, to operate a professional football club. On 3 July 1927, the club held a second testimonial match for Paulino Alcántara, against the Spain national team. To kick off the match, local journalist and pilot Josep Canudas dropped the ball onto the pitch from his airplane. In 1928, victory in the Spanish Cup was celebrated with a poem titled "Oda a Platko", which was written by a member of the Generation of '27, Rafael Alberti, inspired by the heroic performance of the Barcelona goalkeeper, Franz Platko. Barcelona also won the inaugural La Liga title the following year. On 30 July 1930, Gamper committed suicide after a period of depression brought on by personal and financial problems.

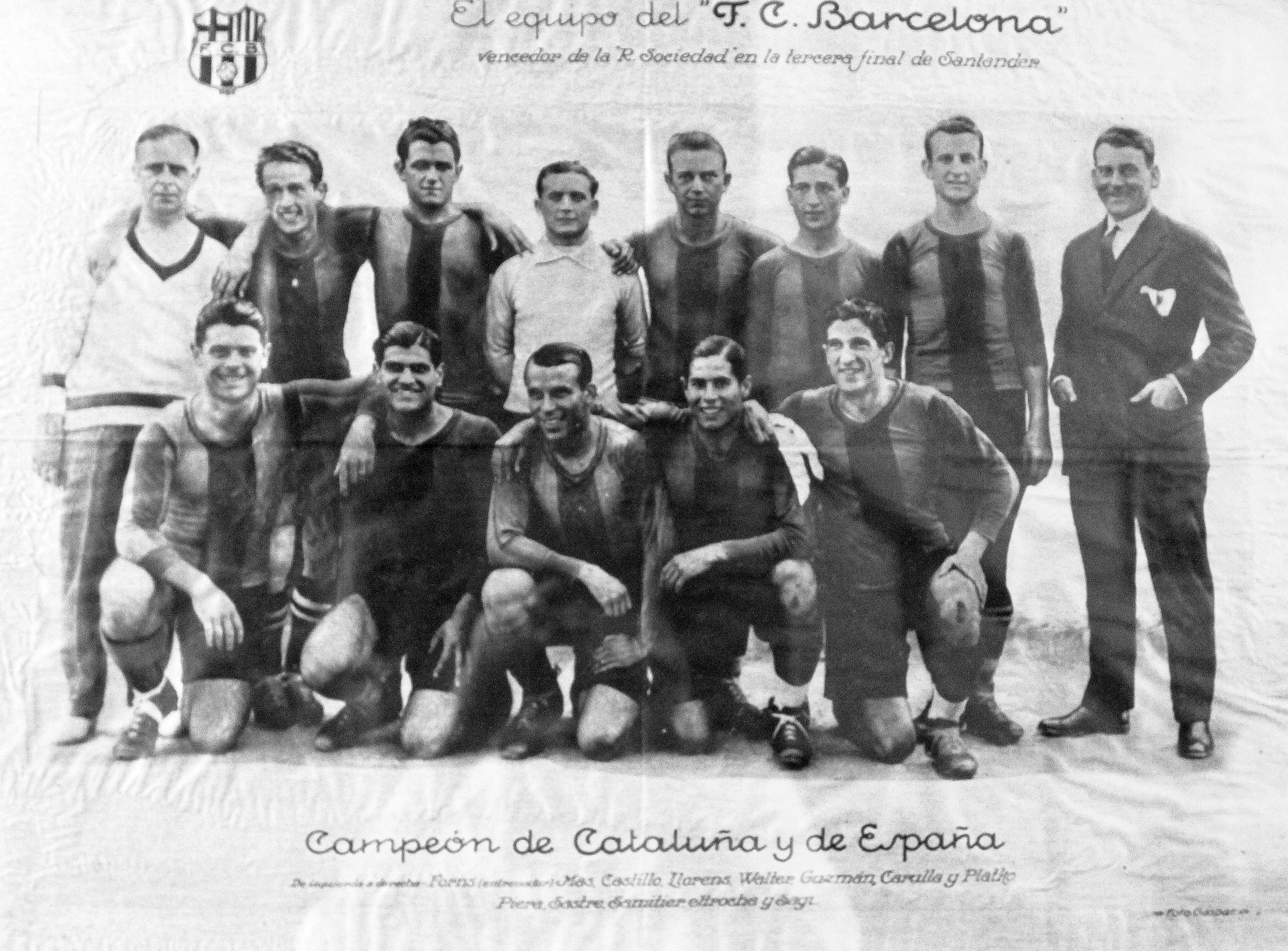
Barcelona's Copa del Rey-winning squad of 1928.

Although they continued to have players of the standing of Josep Escolà, the club now entered a period of decline, in which political conflict overshadowed sports throughout society. Attendance at matches dropped as the citizens of Barcelona were occupied with discussing political matters. Although the team won the Campionat de Catalunya in 1930, 1931, 1932, 1934, 1936 and 1938, success at a national level (with the exception of the 1937 disputed title) evaded them.

A month after the Spanish Civil War began in 1936, several players from Barcelona enlisted in the ranks of those who fought against the military uprising, along with players from Athletic Bilbao. On 6 August, Falangist soldiers near Guadarrama murdered club president Josep Sunyol, a representative of the pro-independence political party. He was dubbed the martyr of barcelonisme, and his murder was a defining moment in the history of FC Barcelona and Catalan identity. In the summer of 1937, the squad was on tour in Mexico and the United States, where it was received as an ambassador of the Second Spanish Republic. The tour led to the financial security of the club, but also resulted in half of the team seeking asylum in Mexico and France, making it harder for the remaining team to contest for trophies.

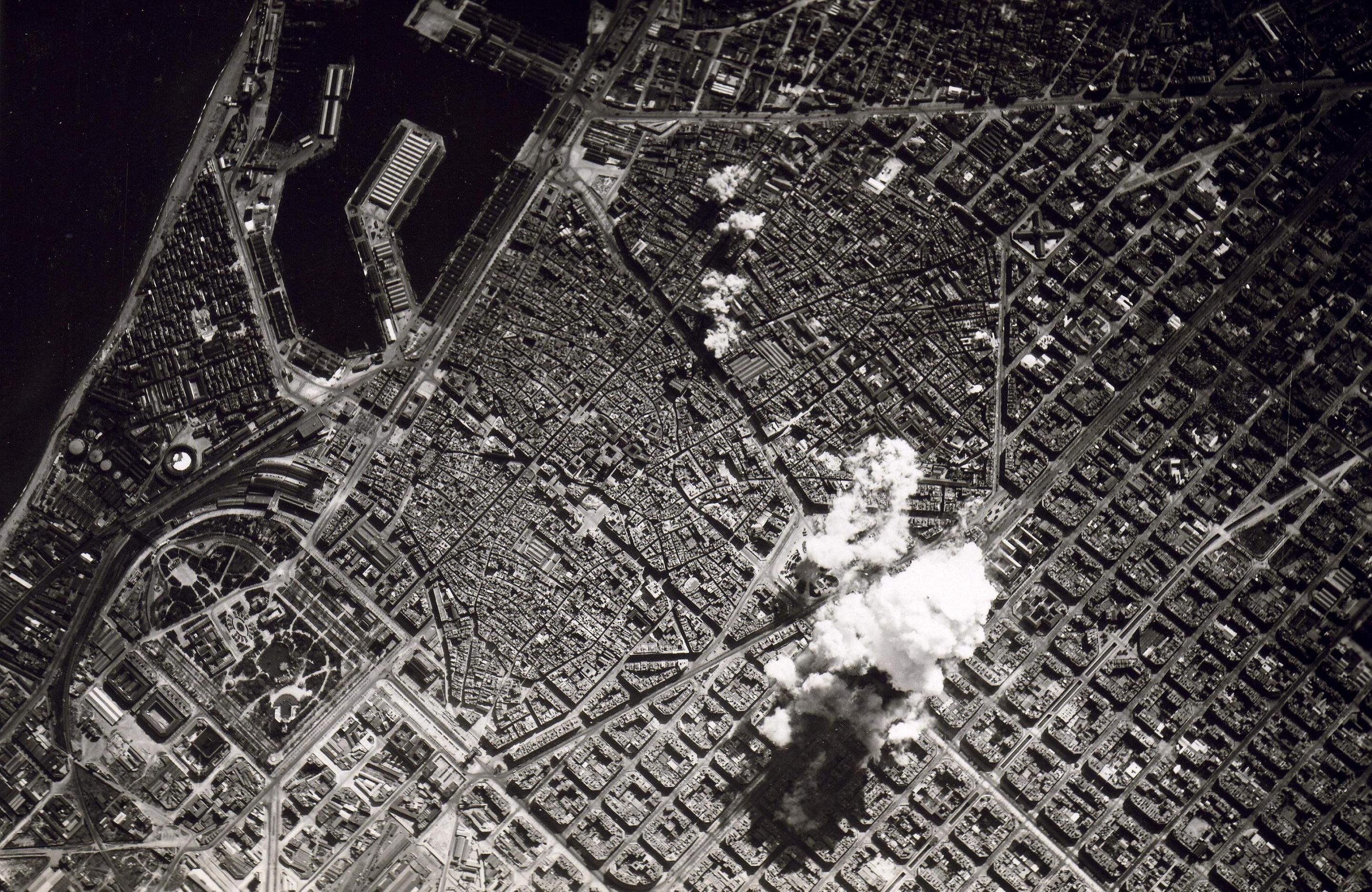
The aerial bombardment of Barcelona seen from one of the bombers

On 16 March 1938, Barcelona came under aerial bombardment from the Italian Air Force, causing more than 3,000 deaths, with one of the bombs hitting the club's offices. A few months later, Catalonia came under occupation and as a symbol of the "undisciplined" Catalanism, the club, now down to just 3,486 members, and faced a number of restrictions. All signs of regional nationalism, including language, flag and other signs of separatism were banned throughout Spain. The Catalan flag was banned and the club were prohibited from using non-Spanish names. These measures forced the club to change its name to Club de Fútbol Barcelona and to remove the Catalan flag from its crest.

In 1943, Barcelona faced rivals Real Madrid in the semi-finals of Copa del Generalísimo. The first match at Les Corts was won by Barcelona 3–0. Before the second leg, Franco's director of state security visited Barcelona's players in the changing room. He reminded them that they were only playing due to the "generosity of the regime". Real Madrid comfortably won the match, beating Barcelona 11–1.

Despite the difficult political situation, CF Barcelona enjoyed considerable success during the 1940s and 1950s. In 1945, with Josep Samitier as coach and players like César, Ramallets and Velasco, they won La Liga for the first time since 1929. They added two more titles in 1948 and 1949. In 1949, they also won the first Copa Latina. In June 1950, Barcelona signed Ladislao Kubala, who was to be an important figure at the club.

On a rainy Sunday of 1951, the crowd left Les Corts stadium after a 2–1 win against Santander by foot, refusing to catch any trams, and surprising the Francoist authorities. The reason was simple: at the same time, a tram strike was taking place in Barcelona, receiving the support of blaugrana fans. Events like this made CF Barcelona represent much more than just Catalonia and many progressive Spaniards saw the club as a staunch defender of rights and freedoms.

Coach Fernando Daučík and player László Kubala, regarded by many as the club's best, inspired the team to several trophies in 1952, including La Liga, the Copa del Generalísimo, the Copa Latina, the Copa Eva Duarte and the Copa Martini Rossi. In 1953, they helped the club win La Liga and the Copa del Generalísimo again.

== Club de Fútbol Barcelona (1957–1978) ==
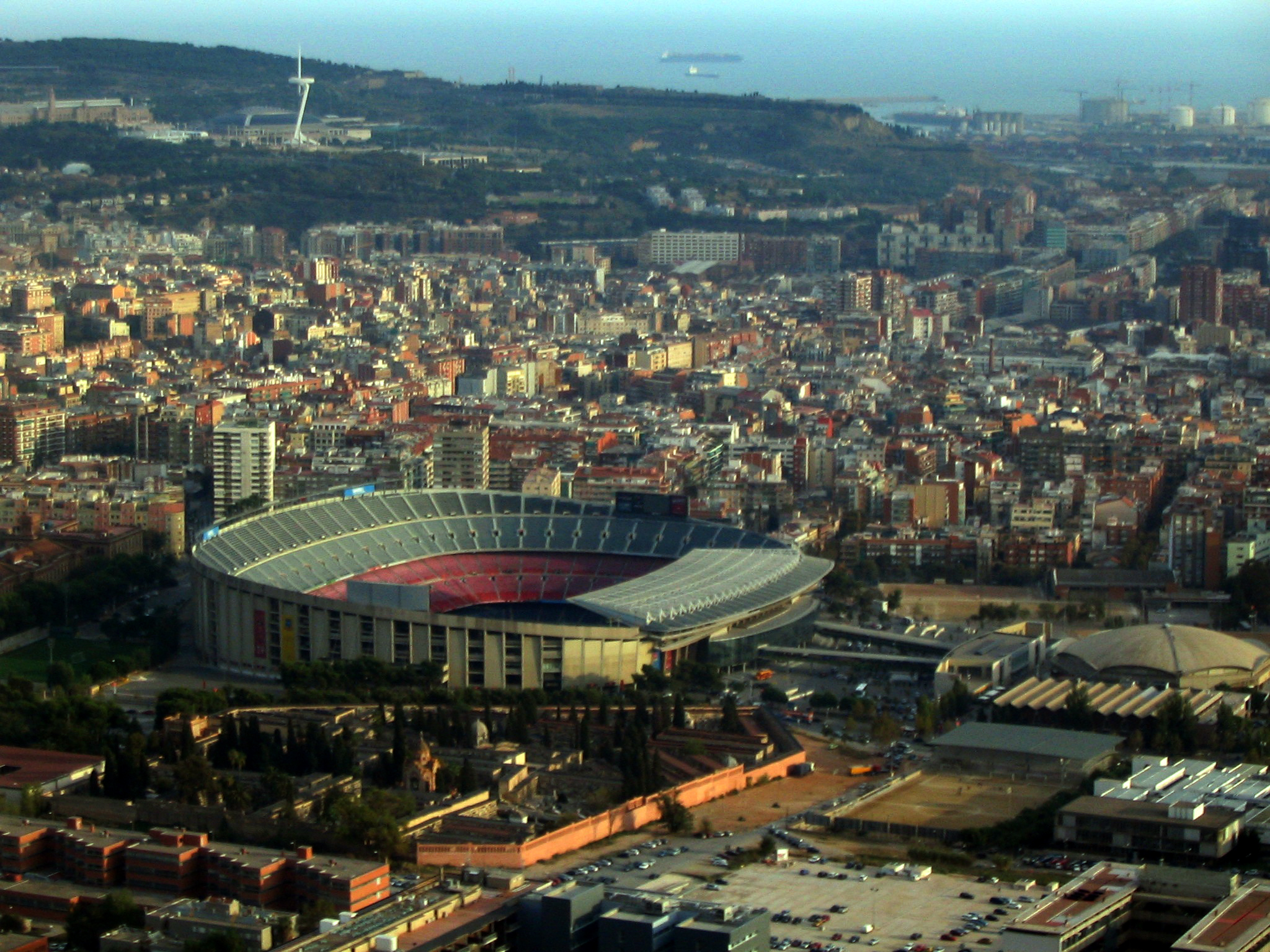
The Camp Nou as seen above, was finished in 1957.

With Helenio Herrera as coach, a young Luis Suárez, the European Footballer of the Year in 1960, and two influential Hungarians recommended by László Kubala, Sándor Kocsis and Zoltán Czibor, the team won another national double in 1959 and a La Liga and Fairs Cup double in 1960. In 1961, they became the first club to beat Real Madrid in a European Cup play-off. However, they lost 2–3 to Benfica in the final.

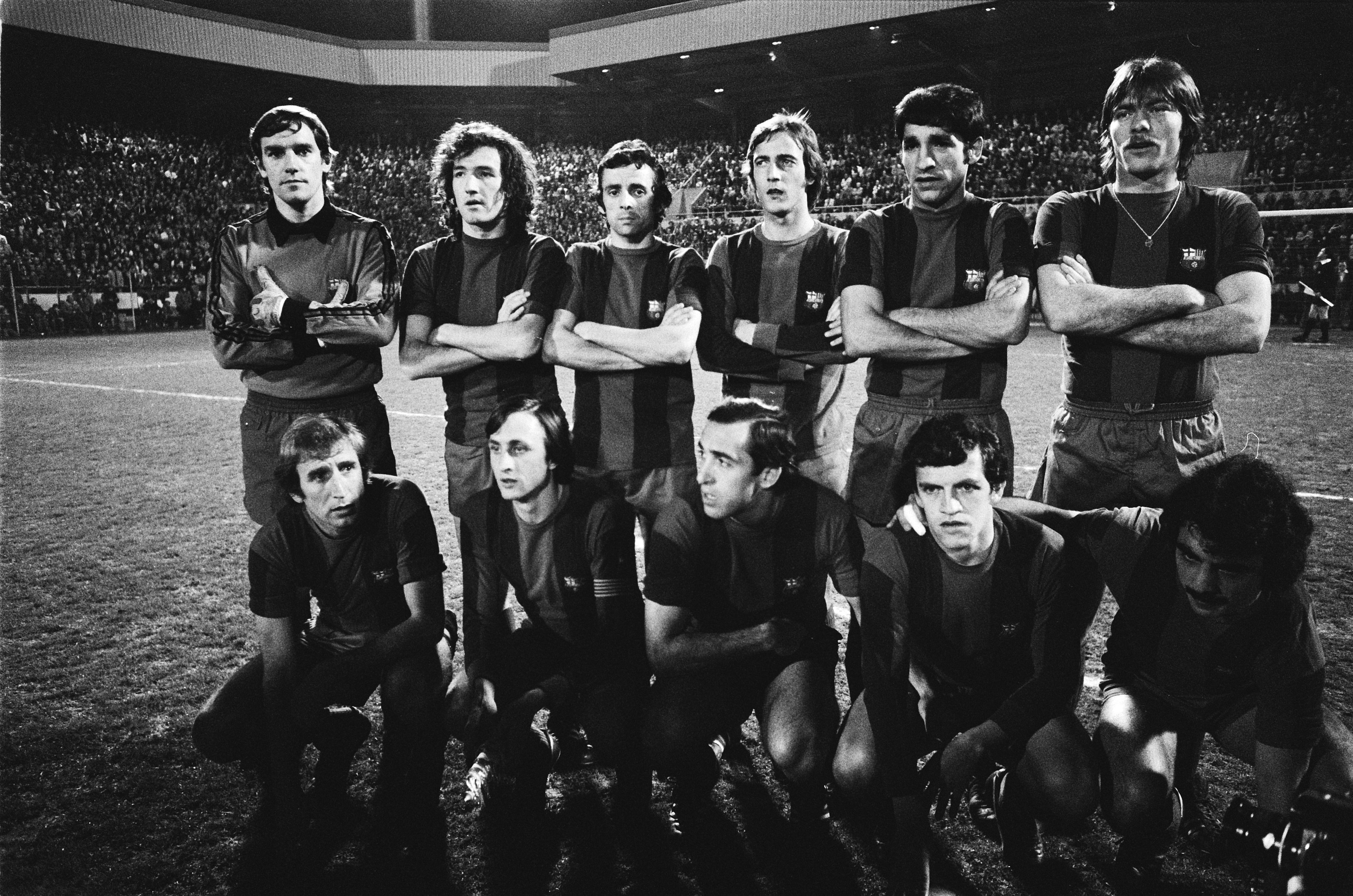
Barcelona face PSV in the 1977–78 UEFA Cup semi-finals. They also finished the season as Copa del Rey winners.

The 1960s were less successful for the club, with Real Madrid monopolising La Liga. The completion of the Camp Nou, finished in 1957, meant the club had little money to spend on new players. The 1960s saw the emergence of Josep Maria Fusté and Carles Rexach, and the club won the Copa del Generalísimo in 1963 and the Fairs Cup in 1966. Barcelona restored some pride by beating Real Madrid 1–0 in the 1968 Copa del Generalísimo final at the Santiago Bernabéu – in front of Francisco Franco – with their coach Salvador Artigas, a former republican pilot in the civil war. With the end of Franco's dictatorship in 1975, the club changed its official name back to Futbol Club Barcelona and reverted the crest to its original design, including the original letters once again.

The 1973–74 season saw the arrival of a new player in Johan Cruyff, who was bought for a world record £920,000 from Ajax. Already an established player with Ajax, Cruyff quickly won over the Barcelona fans when he told the European press that he chose Barcelona over Real Madrid because he could not play for a club associated with Franco. He further endeared himself when he named his son Jordi, after the local Catalan Saint George. Next to champions like Juan Manuel Asensi, Carles Rexach and Hugo Sotil, he helped the club win the 1973–74 season for the first time since 1960, defeating Real Madrid 5–0 at the Santiago Bernabéu along the way. He was crowned European Footballer of the Year in 1973 during his first season with Barcelona (his second Ballon d'Or win; he won his first while playing for Ajax in 1971). Cruyff received this prestigious award a third time (the first player to do so) in 1974, while he was still with Barcelona.

== Núñez and the stabilization years (1978–2000) ==
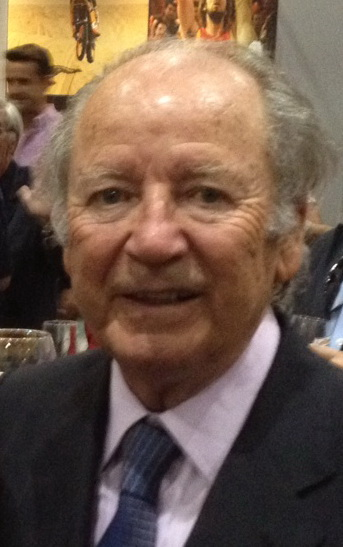
Josep Lluís Núñez i Clemente was the longest-serving president in Barça's history.

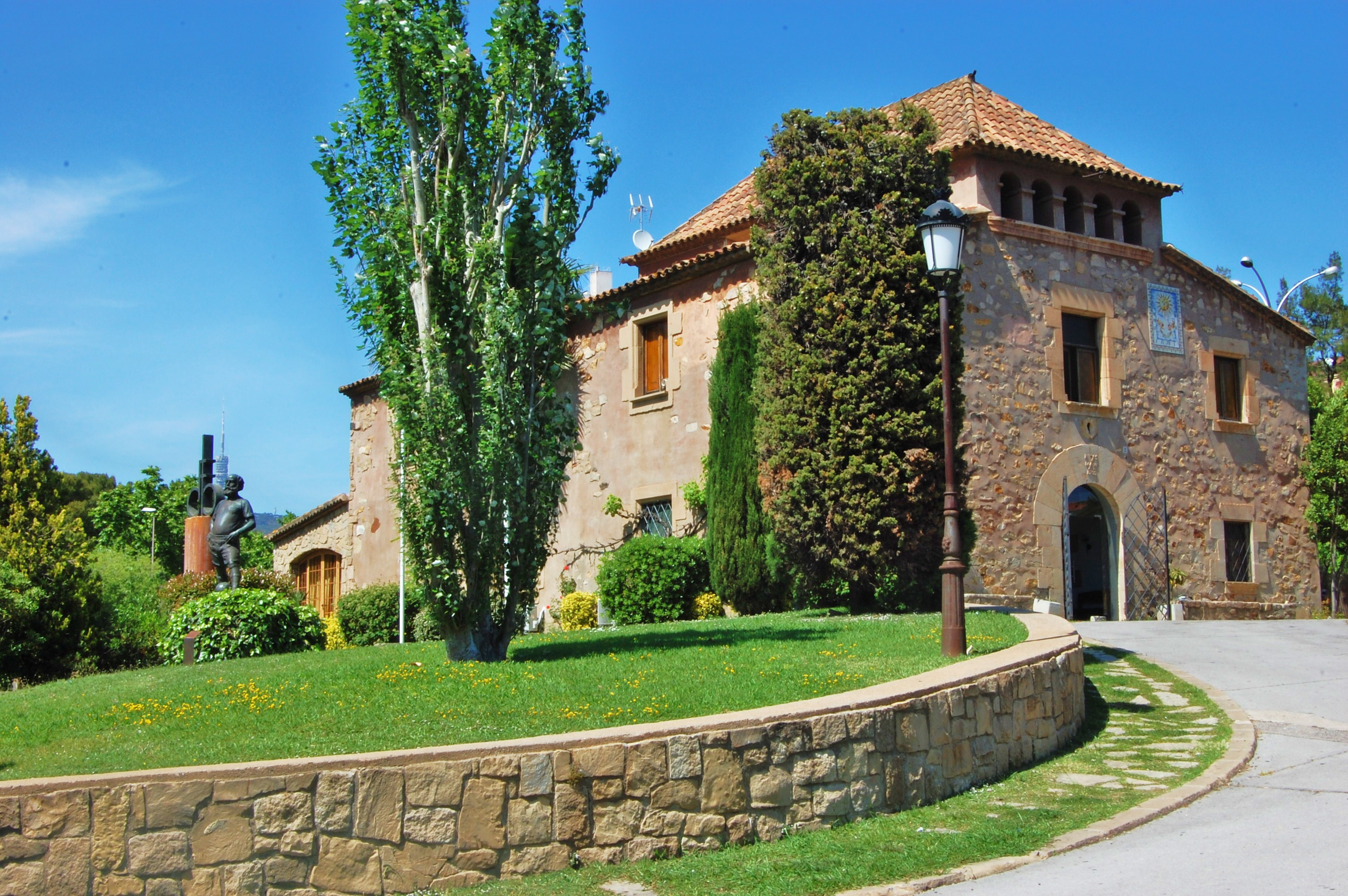
The original La Masia building was the symbolic home of Barça's youth academy.

In 1978, Josep Lluís Núñez became the first elected president of FC Barcelona, and, since then, the members of Barcelona have elected the club president. The process of electing a president of Barcelona was closely tied to Spain's transition to democracy in 1975 and the end of Franco's dictatorship. The new president's main objective was to develop Barcelona into a world-class club by giving it stability both on and off the pitch. His presidency was to last for 22 years, and it deeply affected the image of Barcelona, as Núñez held to a strict policy regarding wages and discipline, letting go of such world-class players as Diego Maradona, Romário and Ronaldo rather than meeting their demands.

On 16 May 1979, the club won its first UEFA Cup Winners' Cup by beating Fortuna Düsseldorf 4–3 in Basel in a final watched by more than 30,000 travelling blaugrana fans. The same year, Núñez began to invest in the club's youth program by converting La Masia to a dormitory for young academy players from abroad. The name of the dormitory would later become synonymous with the youth program of Barcelona.

In June 1982, Diego Maradona was signed for a world record fee of £5 million from Boca Juniors. In the following season, under coach César Luis Menotti, Barcelona won the Copa del Rey, beating Real Madrid. Maradona's time with Barcelona, however, was short-lived and he soon left for Napoli. At the start of the 1984–85 season, Terry Venables was hired as manager and he won La Liga with noteworthy displays by German midfielder Bernd Schuster. The next season, he took the team to their second European Cup final, only to lose on penalties to Steaua București after a 0–0 draw in Seville.

Around this time, tensions began to arise between what was perceived as president Núñez's dictatorial rule and the nationalist support group, Boixos Nois. The group, identified with left-wing separatism, repeatedly demanded the resignation of Núñez and openly defied him through chants and banners at matches. At the same time, Barcelona experienced an eruption in skinheads, who often identified with right-wing separatism. The skinheads slowly transferred the Boixos Nois' ideology from liberalism to fascism, which caused division within the group and a sudden support for Núñez's presidency. Inspired by British hooligans, the remaining Boixos Nois became violent, causing havoc leading to large-scale arrests.

After the 1986 FIFA World Cup, Barcelona signed the English top-scorer Gary Lineker, along with goalkeeper Andoni Zubizarreta, but the team could not achieve success, as Schuster was excluded from the team. Terry Venables was subsequently fired at the beginning of the 1987–88 season and replaced with Luis Aragonés. The season finished with the players rebelling against president Núñez, in an event known as the Hesperia Mutiny (El motí de l'Hespèria/El motín del Hesperia), and a 1–0 victory at the Copa del Rey final against Real Sociedad.

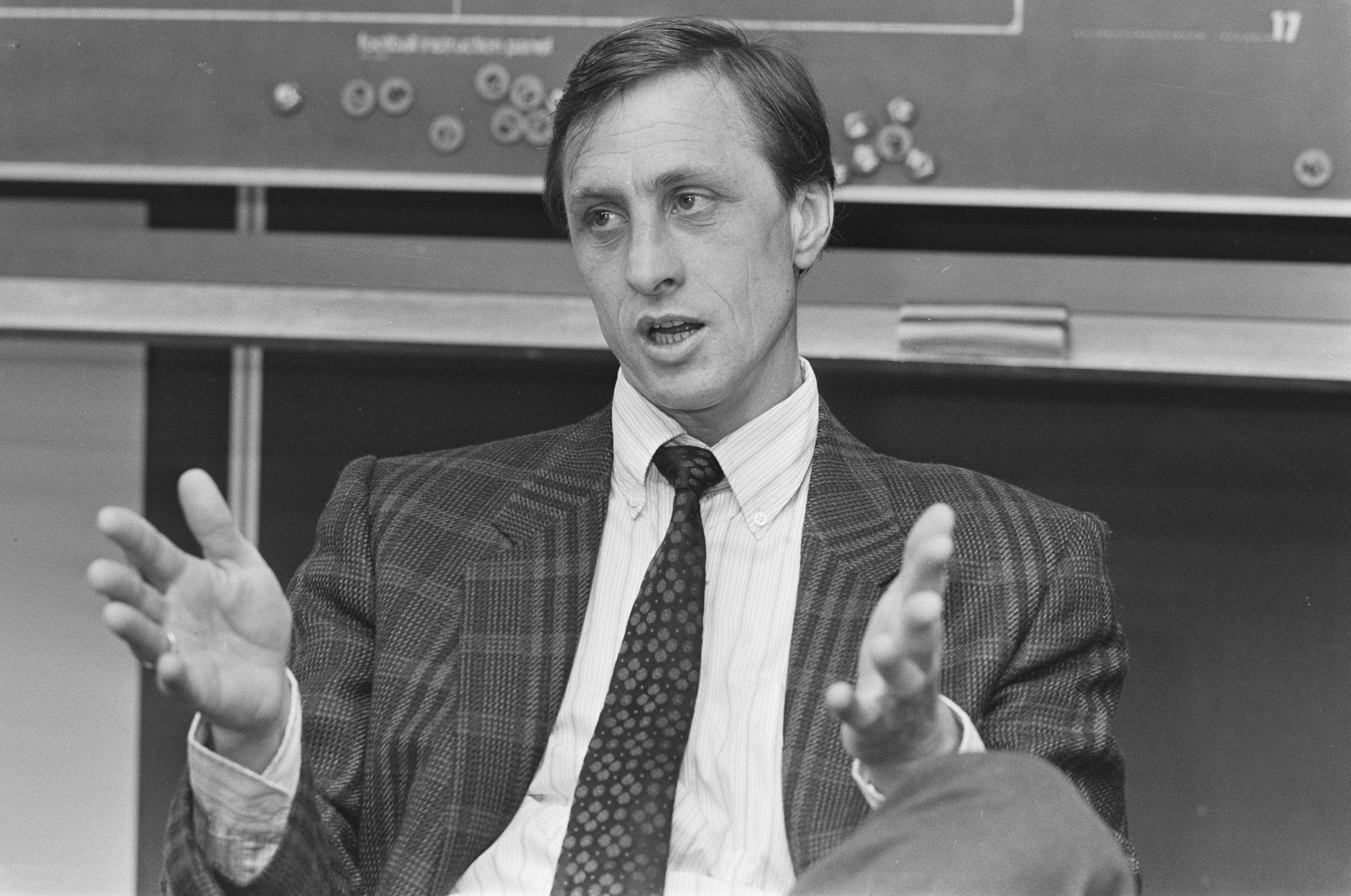
As Barça's longest consecutive serving professional manager and the principal builder of the "Dream Team", Cruyff won four consecutive La Liga titles and led the club to their first European Cup success.

In 1988, Johan Cruyff returned to the club as manager and he assembled a "Dream Team". He used a mix of Spanish players like Pep Guardiola, José Mari Bakero and Txiki Begiristain while signing international players such as Ronald Koeman, Michael Laudrup, Romário and Hristo Stoichkov.

It was ten years after the inception of the youth program, La Masia, when the young players began to graduate and play for their first team. One of the first graduates who would later earn international acclaim was Pep Guardiola. Under Cruyff's guidance, Barcelona won four consecutive La Liga titles from 1991 to 1994. They beat Sampdoria in both the 1989 UEFA Cup Winners' Cup final and the 1992 European Cup final at Wembley Stadium, with a free-kick goal from Dutch international Ronald Koeman. They also won a Copa del Rey in 1990, the European Super Cup in 1992 and three Supercopa de España. With 11 trophies, Cruyff became the then club's most successful manager. He also became the club's longest consecutive serving manager, serving eight years. Cruyff's fortune was to change, however, and in his final two seasons, after he failed to win any trophies, he fell out with president Núñez, resulting in his departure.

Reacting to Cruyff's departure, an independent protest group was organised by Armand Caraben, Joan Laporta and Alfons Godall. The objective of the group, called L'Elefant Blau was to oppose the presidency of Núñez, which they regarded as a corruption of the club's traditional values. Laporta would later take over the presidency of Barcelona in 2003.

Cruyff was briefly replaced by Bobby Robson, who took charge of the club for a single season in 1996–97. He recruited Ronaldo from his previous club, PSV and delivered a cup treble, winning the Copa del Rey, UEFA Cup Winners Cup and the Supercopa de España. Despite his success, Robson was only ever seen as a short-term solution while the club waited for Louis van Gaal to become available.

Like Maradona, Ronaldo only stayed a short time before he left for Internazionale. New stars emerged, however, such as Luís Figo, Patrick Kluivert, Luis Enrique and Rivaldo, and the team won a Copa del Rey and La Liga double in 1998. In 1999, the club celebrated its centenari, winning the La Liga title and where Rivaldo became the fourth Barcelona player to be awarded European Footballer of the Year. Despite this domestic success, the failure to emulate Real Madrid in the Champions League led to van Gaal and Núñez resigning in 2000.

== The Gaspart Era (2000–2003) ==
The departures of Núñez and Louis van Gaal were hardly noticed by the fans when compared to that of Luís Figo, then club vice-captain. Figo had become a cult hero and was considered by Catalans to be one of their own. Barcelona fans, however, were distraught by Figo's decision to join arch-rivals Real Madrid, and, during subsequent visits to the Camp Nou with Madrid, Figo was given an extremely hostile reception. Upon his first return, a piglet's head and a full bottle of whiskey were thrown at him from the crowd. The next three years saw the club in decline, and managers came and went. Van Gaal was replaced by Llorenç Serra Ferrer who, despite an extensive investment in players in the summer of 2000, presided over a mediocre league campaign and a humiliating first-round Champions League exit, and was eventually dismissed late in the season.

Long-serving coach Carles Rexach was appointed as his replacement, initially on a temporary basis, and managed to at least steer the club to the last Champions League spot on the final day of the season. Despite better form in La Liga and a good run to the semi-finals of the Champions League, Rexach was never viewed as a long-term solution and that summer Van Gaal returned to the club for a second spell as manager. What followed, despite another decent Champions League performance, was one of the worst La Liga campaigns in the club's history, with the team as low as 15th in February 2003. This led to Van Gaal's resignation and replacement for the rest of the campaign by Radomir Antić, though a sixth-place finish was the best that he could manage. At the end of the season, Antić's short-term contract was not renewed, and club president Joan Gaspart resigned, his position having been made completely untenable by such a disastrous season on top of the club's overall decline in fortunes since he became president three years prior.

== The Laporta Era (2003–2010) ==
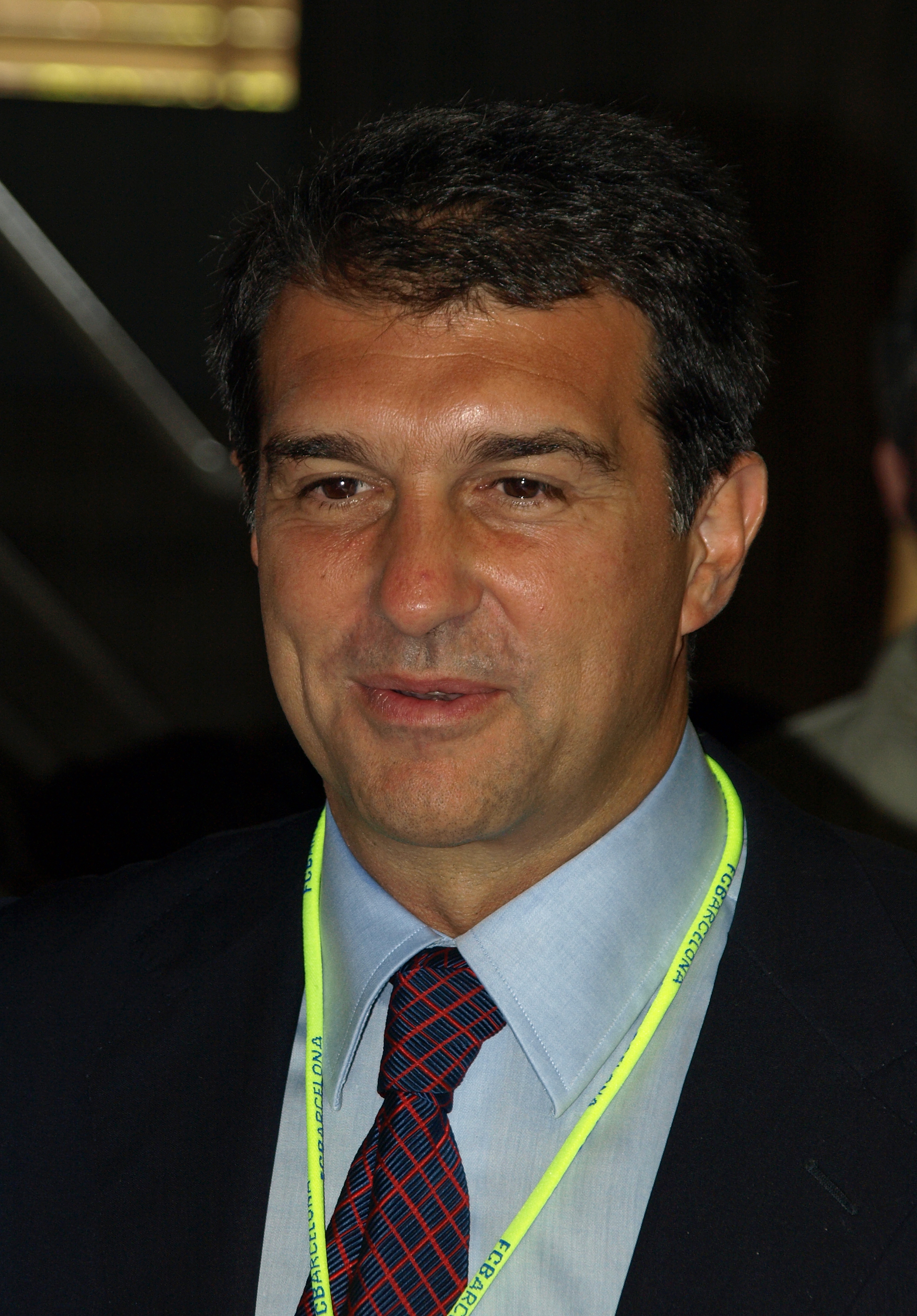
Joan Laporta has been one of the most successful presidents in the club's history.

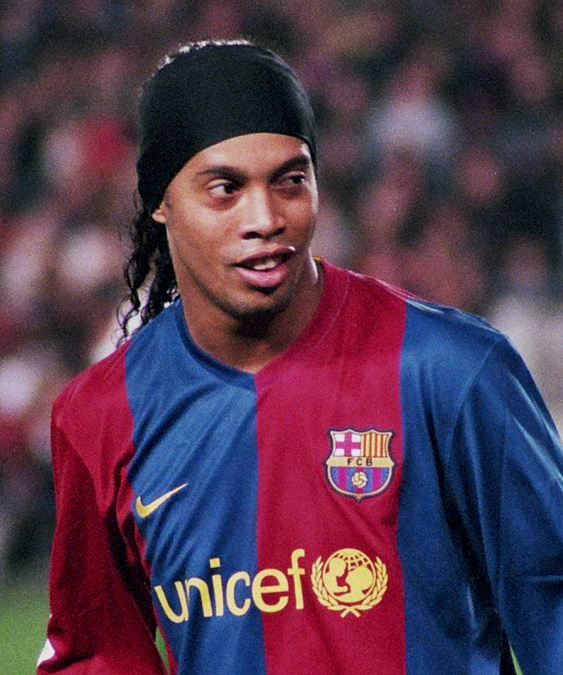
Ronaldinho's arrival in 2003 helped Barcelona "get their smile back".

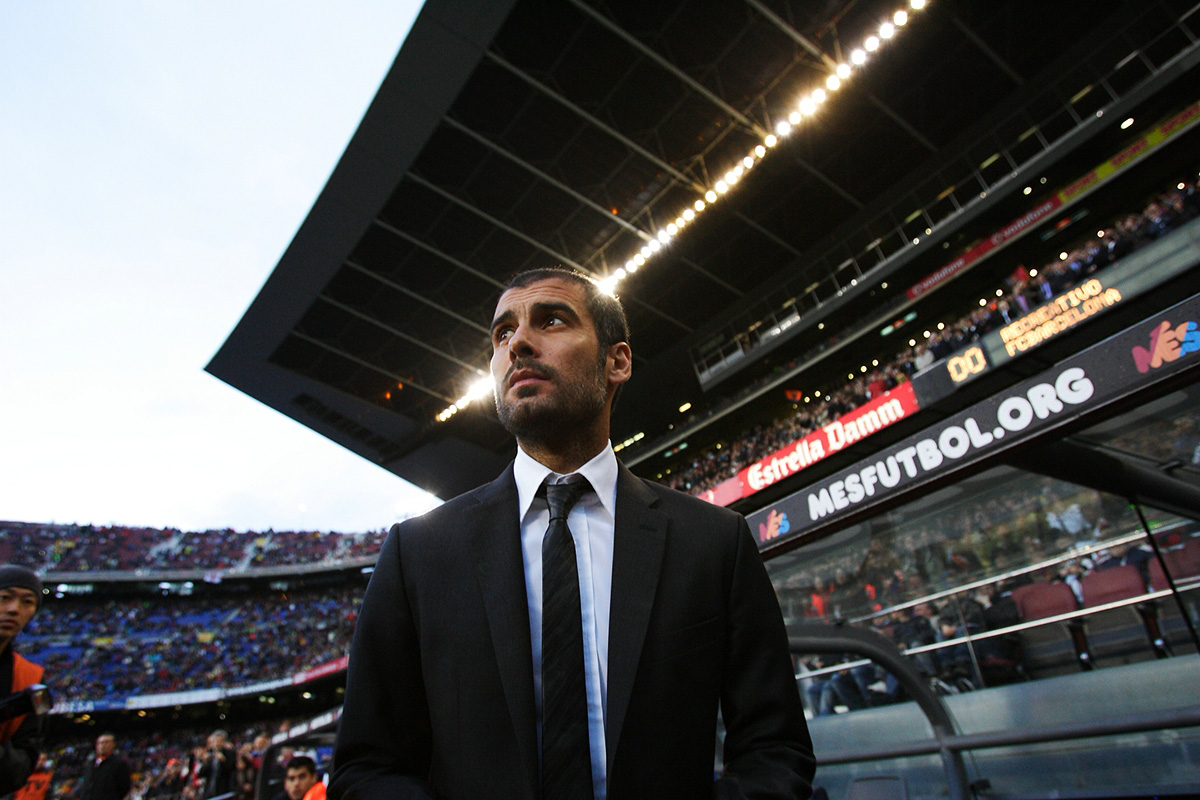
Pep Guardiola's reign at Barcelona (2008–2012) marked one of the most successful eras in the history of the club and its youth academy.

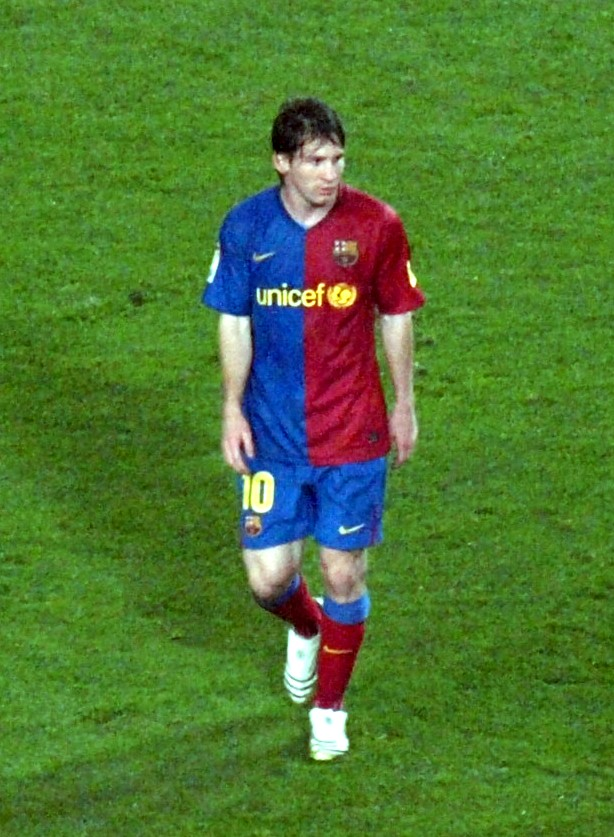
Lionel Messi in 2008

=== Rijkaard's Barça side (2003–2008) ===
After the disappointment of the Gaspart era, the combination of a new young president, Joan Laporta, and a young new manager, former Dutch and Milan star Frank Rijkaard, saw the club bounce back. On the field, an influx of international players, including Ronaldinho, Deco, Henrik Larsson, Ludovic Giuly, Samuel Eto'o and Rafael Márquez, combined with homegrown Spanish players Carles Puyol, Andrés Iniesta, Xavi and Víctor Valdés, led to the club's return to success. Barcelona won La Liga and the Supercopa de España in 2004–05, and Ronaldinho and Eto'o were voted first and third, respectively, in the FIFA World Player of the Year awards.

==== 2005–06 season ====

2006 Champions League final starting lineup

In the 2005–06 season, Barcelona repeated their Liga and Supercopa successes. The pinnacle of the league season arrived at the Santiago Bernabéu Stadium in a 3–0 win over Real Madrid. It was Rijkaard's second victory at the Bernabéu, making him the first Barcelona manager to win there twice. Ronaldinho's performance was so impressive that after his second goal, which was Barcelona's third, some Real Madrid fans gave him a standing ovation. In the Champions League, Barcelona beat Arsenal 2–1 in the final. Trailing 1–0 to a ten-man Arsenal and with less than 15 minutes remaining, they came back to win 2–1, with substitute Henrik Larsson, in his final appearance for the club, setting up goals for Samuel Eto'o and fellow substitute Juliano Belletti, for the club's first European Cup victory in 14 years.

==== 2006–07 season ====
Despite being the favourites and starting strongly, Barcelona finished the 2006–07 season without any trophies won. A pre-season United States tour was later blamed for a string of injuries to key players, including leading scorer Samuel Eto'o and rising star Lionel Messi. There was open feuding as Eto'o publicly criticized coach Rijkaard and Ronaldinho. Ronaldinho also admitted that a lack of fitness affected his form. In La Liga, Barcelona were in first place for much of the season, but inconsistency in the New Year saw Real Madrid overtake them to become champions. Barcelona advanced to the semi-finals of the Copa del Rey, winning the first leg against Getafe 5–2, with a goal from Messi bringing comparison to Diego Maradona's goal of the century, but then lost the second leg 4–0. They took part in the 2006 FIFA Club World Cup, but were beaten by a late goal in the final against Brazilian side Internacional. In the Champions League, Barcelona were knocked out of the competition in the last 16 by eventual runners-up Liverpool on the away goals rule.

==== 2007–08 season ====
Barcelona finished the 2007–08 season third in La Liga and reached the semi-finals of the Champions League and Copa del Rey, both times losing to the eventual champions, Manchester United and Valencia, respectively. The day after a 4–1 defeat to Real Madrid, Joan Laporta announced that Barcelona B coach Pep Guardiola would take over Rijkaard's duties on 30 June 2008.

=== Guardiola's Barça side (2008–2012) ===
==== 2008–09 season ====
In the pre-season of 2008–09, a motion of no confidence was raised against club president Joan Laporta. This motion received 60 percent support, just short of the 66 percent required to oust him, prompting eight of the directors to resign. Continuing as president, Laporta made large changes to the playing staff, spending nearly €90 million rebuilding the squad.

For the second time that season, Barcelona played Real Madrid in El Clásico, this time at the Santiago Bernabéu. Barcelona won the historic match 2–6, which was the largest margin of victory by which Barcelona had won in Madrid since the 1970s, when Johan Cruyff led Barcelona to win 0–5. On 6 May 2009, Barcelona played against Chelsea in the second leg of the Champions League semi-finals. Following a goalless first leg, Chelsea led the second leg at Stamford Bridge 1–0, from the eighth minute until injury time, when Andrés Iniesta scored an equaliser in the 93rd minute from the edge of the penalty area, sending Barcelona through to the final on the away goals rule. On 13 May, Barcelona beat Athletic Bilbao 4–1 to win the Copa del Rey for a record 25th time. Three days later, Real Madrid lost a league match and Barcelona was crowned La Liga champions for the 2008–09 season.

With a largely homegrown squad, in which seven players of the starting 11 were products of their youth academy, La Masia, Barcelona defeated the defending champions Manchester United 2–0 at the Stadio Olimpico in Rome on 27 May 2009, to earn their third Champions League title. This completed the first ever treble won by a Spanish side, having already won La Liga and the Copa del Rey in that season.

==== 2009–10 season ====
Barcelona went on to win the 2009 Supercopa de España against Athletic Bilbao, and the 2009 UEFA Super Cup against Shakhtar Donetsk, becoming the first European club to win both domestic and European Super Cups following a treble. In December 2009, Barcelona won the 2009 Club World Cup, thus becoming the first team ever to accomplish the sextuple. In May 2010, Barcelona won La Liga for the second consecutive time with a record Spanish league tally of 99 points out of 114 possible.

== The Rosell Era (2010–2014) ==
=== 2010–11 season ===
On 13 June, Rosell was elected president of Barcelona with more than 60% of the vote of club members. Barcelona begin start off the season with the traditional curtain raiser, the Supercopa de España, against Sevilla, losing the first leg 3–1 at the Ramón Sánchez Pizjuán Stadium. In the return leg at the Camp Nou, however, the team would win 4–0, thus claiming the Supercopa 5–3 on aggregate. In the 2010–11 season, Barcelona would endure a slow start to the campaign, despite a victory over Racing de Santander (3–0) on the opening day of the season; they would go on to be defeated 2–0 at the Camp Nou by newly promoted minnows Hércules. Nevertheless, Barça would recover and go on to magnificent 5–0 win over Real Madrid at home. In the Champions League semi-finals against Madrid at the Santiago Bernabéu, Lionel Messi scored two goals to ensure a 0–2 win for Barcelona, with the second leg at home ending in a 1–1 draw, sending Barça through to the Final to take on Manchester United. In the Copa del Rey Final at the Mestalla Stadium against Real Madrid, Cristiano Ronaldo would convert a header on the 100th minute to win the Copa for Madrid, 1–0. Barça, however, would end up beating Manchester United 3–1 with goals from Pedro, Messi and David Villa to win them the Champions League for the fourth time in club history. Barcelona would also claim La Liga with 96 points to Real Madrid's 92 for the third time in a row to round off a very successful season.

=== 2011–12 season ===
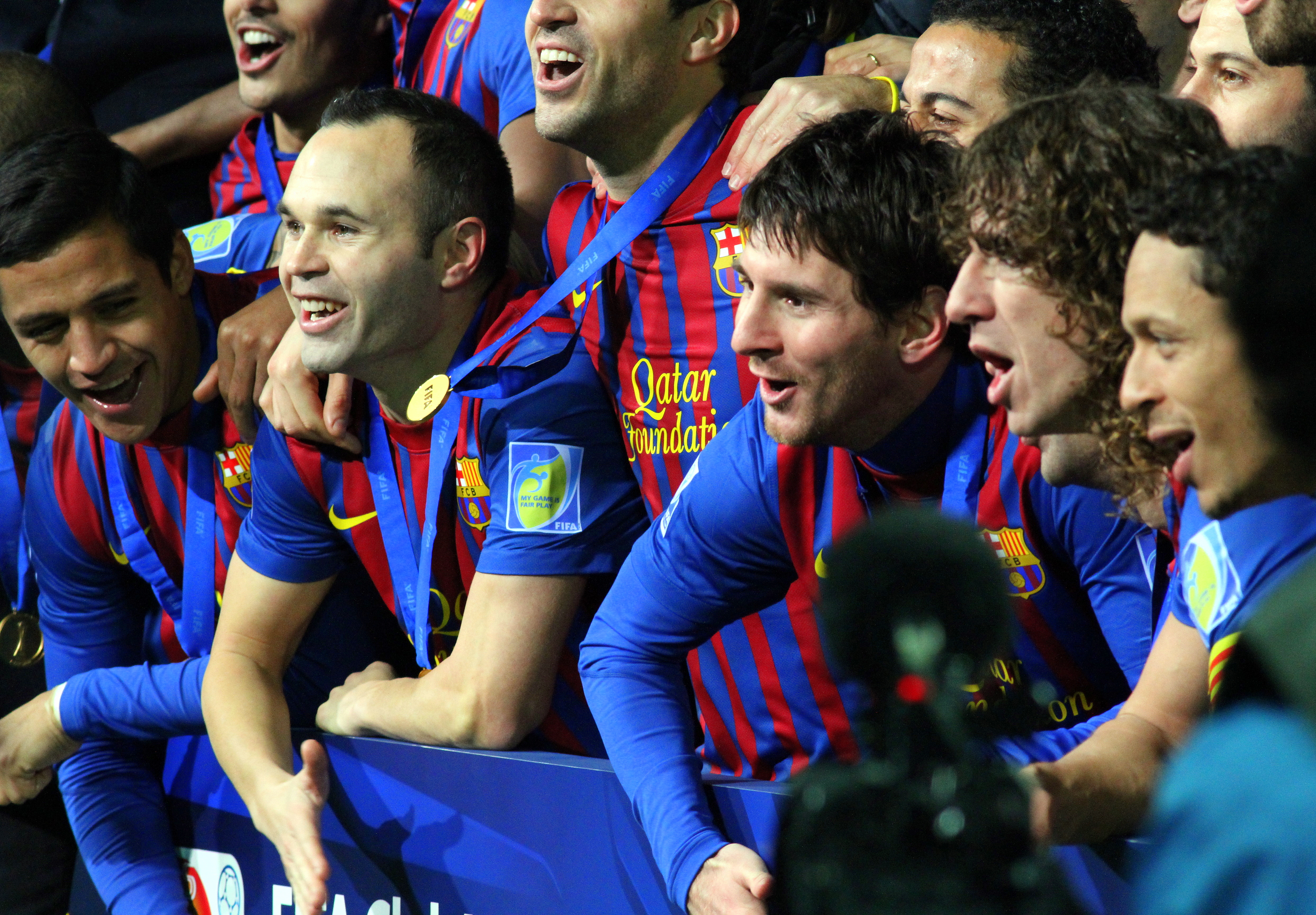
Barcelona celebrating their 2011 FIFA Club World Cup win against Santos FC.

The 2011–12 season would kick off with the Supercopa de España, this time against reigning Copa del Rey champions Real Madrid. In Madrid, Barcelona would play to a 2–2 draw, but would seal the Supercup with a 3–2 win at the Camp Nou. The first kick of a ball in La Liga for Barça would be at the Camp Nou against Villarreal, with the Catalans easily winning 5–0. In the first Liga Clásico of the season, Barcelona would win 1–3 in Madrid to level on points with Madrid heading into the Christmas break. Nevertheless, Barcelona would drop two points away to Espanyol, which ended 1–1, to go two points behind their archrivals Madrid. In the Copa del Rey semi-finals, in the first leg against Real Madrid, the Blaugrana would win 1–2 in Madrid, later sealing their place in the semi-finals after a 2–2 draw at the Camp Nou. In the Round of 16 of the UEFA Champions League, the then-defending champions would defeat Bayer Leverkusen 1–3 in Germany and rout them 7–1 at the Camp Nou. The quarter-finals against Milan would begin slowly for the Catalan club, playing to a 0–0 draw in Milan, only to sweep the Italian club aside 3–1 at the Camp Nou with two strikes from Lionel Messi. In the semi-finals against Chelsea, Barcelona would be defeated 1–0 in London after a Didier Drogba strike in the 45th minute. The second leg, meanwhile, at the Nou Camp finished 2–2, thus eliminating Barcelona from European contention. In the penultimate game of the season at home to Real Madrid, perhaps the most important game of the Catalan club's season, Barça would collapse 1–2 to Real Madrid with a strike each from Sami Khedira and Cristiano Ronaldo, winning Los Blancos the match. On 27 April, coach Pep Guardiola announced in a tearful press conference in Barcelona that he would be stepping down as coach of the Catalan club at the end of the season, citing that he needed a break from football; he was to be replaced by Tito Vilanova. In Barcelona's final game of the season, the Copa del Rey finals against Athletic Bilbao, Barça would win 3–0 with a brace from Pedro and a strike from Messi, winning the club the trophy. That season, Barça also won the 2011 UEFA Super Cup, 2–0 against Porto and the 2011 FIFA Club World Cup, 4–0 against Santos.

=== 2012–13 season ===
Barça's 2012–13 season yet again began with a Supercopa contention, this time another incarnation of El Clásico. Barcelona would win the first leg at home 3–2 with goals from Messi, Pedro and Xavi, but in the second leg, despite a wonderfully-struck free kick from Messi from 35 yards out, Barcelona would succumb 2–1 to their fiercest foes with goals from Ronaldo and Gonzalo Higuaín. In La Liga, Barcelona would shoot straight up to the top of the league table with a 5–1 win over Real Sociedad. In the most-hyped game of the season so far, Barcelona and Real Madrid would play out what many regard as the best Clásico in recent memory, ending in a 2–2 draw at the Camp Nou with both Messi and Ronaldo netting twice for their respective clubs. Barça would also kick off their Copa del Rey defence with a 3–0 win over Alavés. In the Champions League on 7 November 2012, Barcelona would fall 2–1 to Celtic, with Messi grabbing his third Champions League goal of the 2012–13 season in the 90th minute in Glasgow. Barcelona were eliminated from Europe 0–7 on aggregate in the semi-finals against eventual champions Bayern Munich, the worst-ever aggregate loss in any European competition for the club.

== The Bartomeu Era (2014–2020) ==
=== 2013–14 season ===
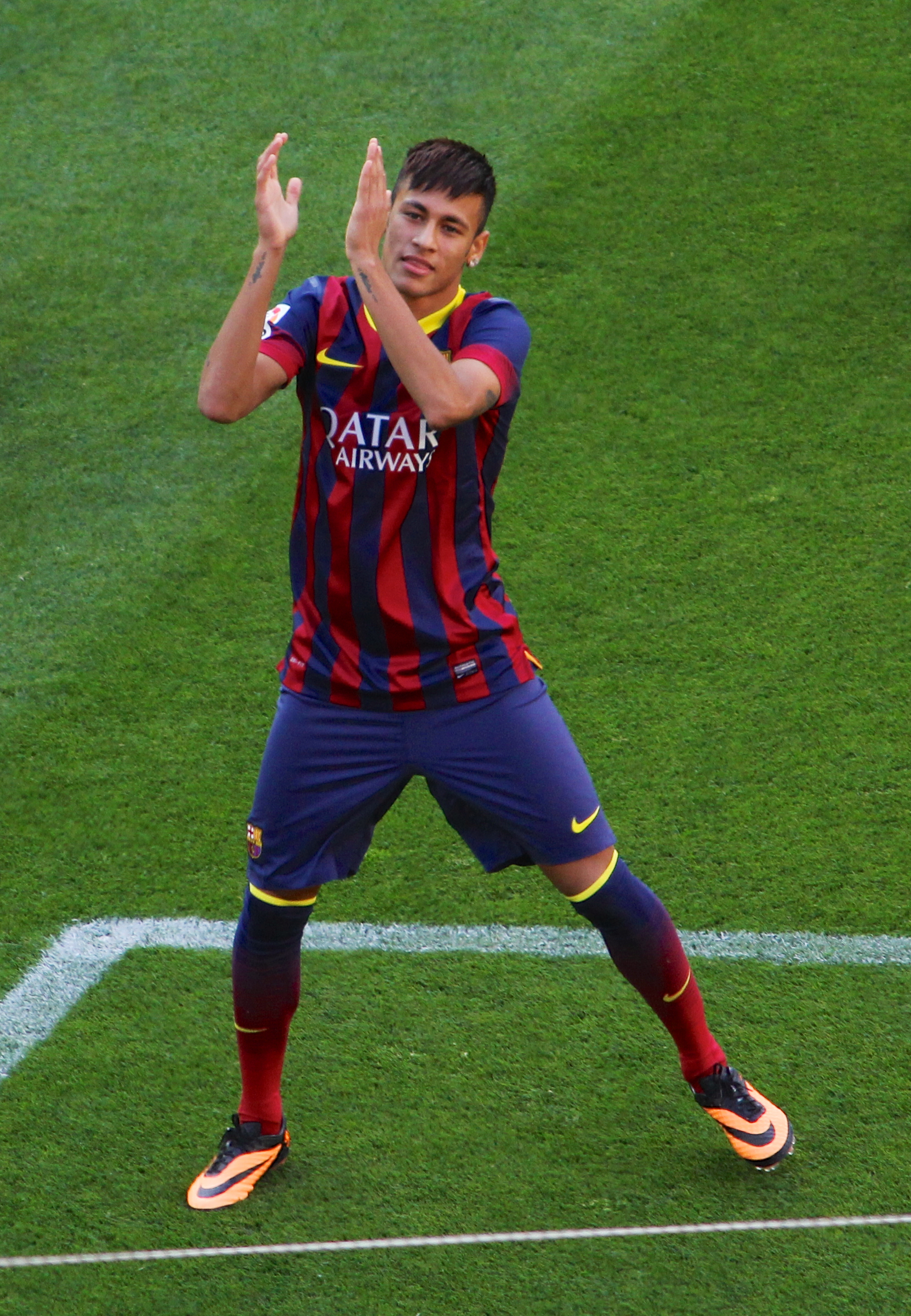
Neymar during his unveiling at Barcelona in June 2013.

On 22 July 2013, Gerardo Martino was confirmed as manager of Barcelona for the 2013–14 season. Barcelona's first official games under Martino were the home and away legs of the 2013 Supercopa de España, which Barça won 1–1 on away goals.

On 23 January 2014, Sandro Rosell resigned as president by the admissibility of the complaint for alleged misappropriation following the transfer of Neymar. Josep Maria Bartomeu replaced him to finish the term in 2016.

In April 2014, FIFA banned the club from buying players for the next two transfer windows following the violation of the FIFA's rules about the transfer of footballers aged under 18. A statement on FIFA's website read, "With regard to the case in question, FC Barcelona has been found to be in breach of art. 19 of the Regulations in the case of ten minor players and to have committed several other concurrent infringements in the context of other players, including under Annexe 2 of the Regulations. The Disciplinary Committee regarded the infringements as serious and decided to sanction the club with a transfer ban at both national and international level for two complete and consecutive transfer periods, together with a fine of CHF 450,000. Additionally, the club was granted a period of 90 days in which to regularise the situation of all minor players concerned." FIFA rejected an appeal in August but the pending appeal to the Court of Arbitration for Sport (CAS) allowed Barcelona to sign players during the summer of 2014.

On 17 May, they played their final game of the season against Atlético Madrid at the Camp Nou, needing a win in order to win the La Liga championship, while Atletico needed at least a draw in order to win their first league title since the 1995–96 season and their 10th overall. Barcelona were leading 1–0 at the 33rd minute after Alexis Sánchez opened the scoreline, however Diego Godín headed an equaliser for Altetico in the 49th minute, drawing the game 1–1, and giving Atletico Madrid their 10th La Liga title.

=== 2014–15 season ===
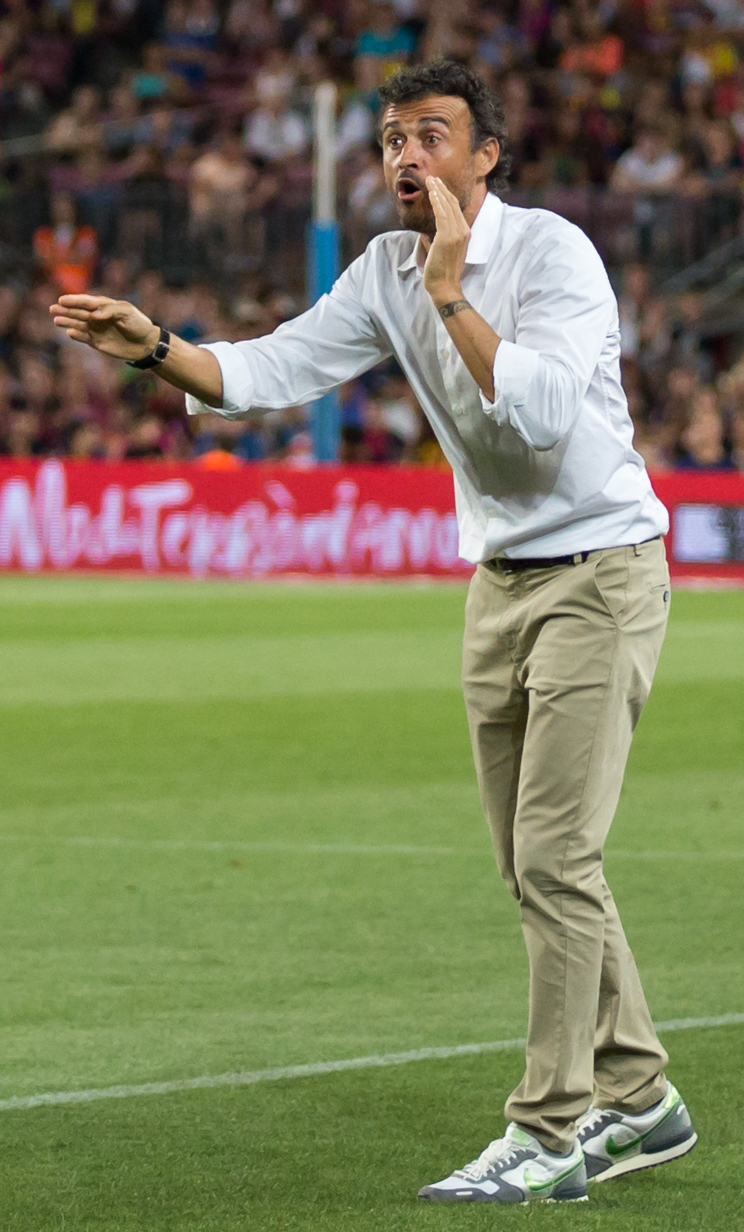
Luis Enrique managing Barça in 2014.

On 19 May 2014, it was announced that Luis Enrique would return to Barcelona as head coach after he agreed to a two-year deal. He was recommended by sporting director Andoni Zubizarreta, his former Spain national teammate. Following Luis Enrique's arrival, Barcelona broke their transfer record when they paid Liverpool between €81 and €94 million for striker Luis Suárez, who at the time was serving a four-month ban from all football-related activity imposed by the FIFA Disciplinary Committee after biting Italian defender Giorgio Chiellini during his appearance for Uruguay in a World Cup group stage match.

In late December 2014, Barcelona's appeal to the CAS was unsuccessful and the original transfer ban was reinstated, leaving the club unable to utilise the 2015 winter and summer transfer windows. On 5 January 2015, Zubizareta was sacked by the board after 4 years as director of football. On 12 February 2015, Barcelona announced the formation of a new Football Area Technical Commission, made up of vice-president Jordi Mestre, board member Javier Bordas, Carles Rexach and Ariedo Braida.

Barcelona won the treble in the 2014–15 season, winning La Liga, Copa del Rey and the UEFA Champions League, and became the first European team to have won the treble twice. On 17 May, the club clinched their 23rd La Liga title after defeating Atlético Madrid. This was Barcelona's seventh La Liga title in the last ten years. On 30 May, the club defeated Athletic Bilbao in the Copa del Rey final at Camp Nou. On 6 June, Barcelona won the Champions League final with a 3–1 win against Juventus, which completed the treble, the club's second in six years.

=== 2015–16 season ===
Barcelona started their 2015–16 season with a 5–4 win against 2014–15 UEFA Europa League winners, Sevilla, during the 2015 UEFA Super Cup. Spanish winger, Pedro, scored the winning goal for Barça after extra time during the 115th minute. Barcelona's performance in the 2015 Supercopa de España, however, was not as exciting. In the first leg against Athletic Bilbao in San Mamés Stadium, Bilbao, Barcelona lost 4–0 to Ernesto Valverde's Athletic side, with Aritz Aduriz scoring 3 goals in 15 minutes for the Basque outfit. Three days later, during the second leg at the Camp Nou, Barcelona and Bilbao held a 1–1 draw, meaning Athletic Bilbao won 5–1 on aggregate.

Despite the departures of Pedro and Xavi, each of whom went to English club, Chelsea, and Qatari side, Al Sadd, respectively, Barcelona were able to defend their league title, with a 3–0 win over Granada at the final day of season. Uruguayan striker, Luis Suárez, scored all 3 goals of the match, as the win put them one point above their El Clásico rivals, securing the title. Barcelona also won the 2015–16 Copa del Rey with a 2–0 win against Sevilla in the final. Barcelona also won the 2015 FIFA Club World Cup, with a 3–0 win against Argentine club, River Plate, in the final.

In the UEFA Champions League, Barcelona finished at the top of their group stage, without losing once. During the knockout rounds, Barcelona started with a 5–1 aggregate win over English side, Arsenal in the Round of 16. During the quarter-finals, however, they were knocked out by Atlético Madrid, after a 0–2 loss at the Vicente Calderón Stadium, making them lose 2–3 on aggregate.

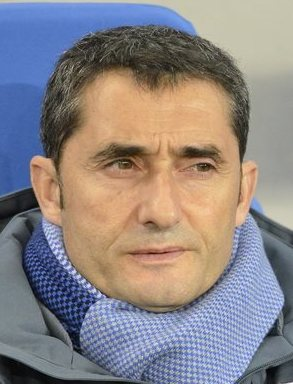
Ernesto Valverde was the manager of Athletic Bilbao during the 2015 Supercopa de España. He would eventually manage Barcelona following Luis Enrique's departure.

=== 2016–17 season ===
On 27 June 2016, Brazilian right-back, Dani Alves left Barcelona for Juventus on a free transfer, and on 25 August 2016, Manchester City announced that they had signed Chilean goalkeeper, Claudio Bravo. Bravo also played as goalkeeper during all 180 minutes of their 5–0 aggregate victory in the 2016 Supercopa de España against Sevilla. During the summer transfer window, Barcelona notably signed Samuel Umtiti from Lyon, and Paco Alcácer from Valencia. They also signed Dutch goalie, Jasper Cillessen from Ajax, as a back-up goalkeeper to Marc-André ter Stegen.

Barcelona were able to win the 2016–17 Copa del Rey, after they defeated Deportivo Alavés 3–1 in the final. They weren't able to defend their league, however, as they finished 3 points behind Real Madrid. Their last loss during that league season was a 0–2 away defeat to Málaga.

Barcelona's campaign in Europe was a different story. Their first game in the 2016–17 UEFA Champions League was a 7–0 thrashing of Celtic in the group stage; three of those goals came from Lionel Messi. Barcelona finished at the top of the group with 15 points, and their only loss in the group stage was a 1–3 loss to Pep Guardiola's Manchester City at the Etihad Stadium. In the round of 16, Barcelona was drawn against French club, Paris-Saint Germain. In the first leg, they shocking lost 4–0 at the Parc des Princes in France. More shocking, in the second leg, Barcelona won 6–1 against the French outfit, meaning the Catalan club won 6–5 on aggregate and progressed to the quarterfinals. The match was dubbed by the Spanish media and FC Barcelona fans as "La Remontada" (Spanish for "The Comeback"). Despite this, Barcelona were knocked out in the quarter-finals by Juventus, losing 0–3 on aggregate following a 0–0 draw at the Camp Nou.

=== 2017–18 season ===
On 1 March 2017, Luis Enrique announced that he would be leaving Barcelona at the end of that season following their 6–1 win against Sporting Gijón. On 29 May 2017, FC Barcelona announced that Ernesto Valverde would be the new manager of the club. Luis Enrique wasn't the only significant person to leave Barcelona during the summer of 2017. Brazilian star, Neymar, who scored 2 goals against Paris Saint-Germain during their 6–1 "remontada", left for the French side for a world record €222 million fee. As a replacement, Barcelona signed French striker, Ousmane Dembélé from Borussia Dortmund for €105 million. During the 2017–18 winter transfer window, Barcelona signed Philippe Coutinho from Liverpool, and sold Javier Mascherano to Chinese Super League outfit, Hebei China Fortune.

Barcelona's first game of the 2017–18 season was a 1–3 loss to Real Madrid in the first leg of the 2017 Supercopa de España at the Camp Nou. Three days later, they would lose 0–2 at the Bernabéu, meaning that they would ironically lose 5–1 on aggregate. Despite this, Barcelona won the Double and won both La Liga and the Copa del Rey. During the league season, they almost went unbeaten, losing only once in La Liga during their penultimate game of the season against Levante at the Estadi Ciutat de València. They won the 2018 Copa del Rey Final at the Wanda Metropolitano with a 5–0 victory over Sevilla. Barcelona were also knocked out in the 2017–18 UEFA Champions League during the quarter-finals by Roma, following a 3–0 loss at the Stadio Olimpico, meaning the two-legged tie was tied 4–4, but Roma won on away goals.

The 2017–18 was Andrés Iniesta's last season at FC Barcelona, as he decided to leave the club for J.League side Vissel Kobe. As a replacement, Barcelona signed Chilean midfielder, Arturo Vidal from Bayern Munich.

=== 2018–19 season ===
Barcelona won their first game of the 2018–19 season, the 2018 Supercopa de España against Sevilla, at the Stade Ibn Batouta in Morocco. It was the first Supercopa de España to be held outside of Spain. Barcelona also secured their 26th La Liga title during the 2018–19 season, following a 1–0 win against Levante at the Camp Nou, with three games remaining in the season. However, they were knocked out of the 2018–19 UEFA Champions League in the semi-finals by Liverpool. For the second consecutive year, Barcelona was eliminated with a three-goal first-leg lead. They won the first leg 3–0 at the Camp Nou, but Liverpool overturned the deficit with a 4–0 second leg victory at Anfield, meaning that Liverpool won 4–3 on aggregate and progressed to the final, which they won. Barcelona also lost the 2019 Copa del Rey Final, with a 1–2 defeat to Valencia at the Estadio Benito Villamarín in Seville.

=== 2019–20 season ===
On 13 January 2020, following the loss to Atlético Madrid in the Spanish Supercup, former Real Betis coach Quique Setién replaced Ernesto Valverde as the new head coach of Barcelona. Barcelona were leading the league when the COVID-19 pandemic halted the competition, and their performance subsequently fell off after a lockdown, with Barça ultimately losing the league title to Real Madrid on 16 July, with just one game to spare.

In the Champions League, Barcelona suffered one of their worst defeats in history, losing 2–8 against Bayern Munich in the one-legged quarter-final tie. The club finished the season trophyless for first time in 12 years.

== The return of Laporta and post-Messi era (2021–present) ==
=== 2020–21 season ===
On 17 August, the club confirmed that Setién had been removed from his position as manager, with director of football Eric Abidal also dismissed from his position. Two days later, Ronald Koeman was appointed as the new head coach of Barcelona.

Rising dissatisfaction among supporters due to worsening finances and decline on the pitch in the previous seasons led to Josep Maria Bartomeu announcing his resignation as president on 27 October 2020 to avoid facing a vote of no confidence from the club members.

On 7 March 2021, Joan Laporta was elected president of Barcelona with 54.28% of the vote. In the Champions League, Barcelona were knocked out by Paris Saint-Germain in the round of 16, breaking the streak of 13 successive appearances in the quarter-finals. Barcelona won a record-extending 31st Copa del Rey, their only trophy under Koeman, after defeating Athletic Bilbao 4–0 in the final. Barcelona finished the 2020–21 season third in La Liga, their lowest league position since the 2007–08 season.

=== 2021–22 season ===
In August 2021 Barcelona found themselves unable to comply with La Liga's Financial Fair Play requirements, and revealed Barca's debt of €1.35bn and a wage bill accounting for 103% of total income. Negotiations with Lionel Messi, now in the final year of his contract, had been ongoing for some time. However, on 5 August 2021, Barcelona announced that they would be unable to re-sign Messi to an extension due to La Liga regulations. This was despite the fact that the club and Messi had reached an agreement over the details of a new contract. Messi departed the club after 21 years as a Barça player and the club's all-time leading goalscorer, and signed on a free transfer with French champions Paris Saint-Germain. The financial implications also restricted Barcelona in the transfer market and as a result most of the incoming players were either free transfers or loans and they had to reduce players' wages to register the incoming players.

Poor performances in La Liga and the Champions League led to the sacking of Ronald Koeman on 28 October, with a club legend Xavi replacing him. Xavi could not reverse the fortunes in the Champions League, and Barcelona dropped down to the Europa League for the first time since 2003–04, subsequently exiting in the quarter-finals. In the domestic league, Xavi massively improved Barça's form and guided them from ninth to second, guaranteeing a Champions League spot next season - including a 4–0 win over Real in Madrid - first win over Real since 2019. However, this also meant Barcelona finished trophyless after earlier Supercopa and Copa del Rey exits.

=== 2022–23 season ===
On 1 July 2022, the stadium was officially renamed as "Spotify Camp Nou". It was the first time in club history to reach a deal with a partner who acquires the naming rights to the stadium.

On 15 January 2023, Xavi guided Barcelona to their first trophy since the 2021 Copa del Rey, as the Catalans defeated Real Madrid 3–1 in the Supercopa de España final. On 14 May 2023, Barcelona mathematically clinched their 27th league title with four games to spare, the first in the post-Messi era.
