= 2013–14 La Liga =

Spanish football league season

La Liga
- Season: 2013–14
- Dates: 17 August 2013 – 18 May 2014
- Champions: Atlético Madrid; 10th title
- Relegated: Osasuna; Valladolid; Real Betis
- Champions League: Atlético Madrid; Barcelona; Real Madrid; Athletic Bilbao
- Europa League: Sevilla; Villarreal; Real Sociedad
- Matches: 380
- Goals: 1,045 (2.75 per match)
- Top goalscorer: Cristiano Ronaldo (31 goals)
- Biggest home win: Barcelona 7–0 Levante (18 August 2013); Atlético Madrid 7–0 Getafe (23 November 2013); Barcelona 7–0 Osasuna (16 March 2014)
- Biggest away win: Real Betis 0–5 Real Madrid (19 January 2014); Almería 0–5 Real Madrid (23 November 2013); Málaga 0–5 Celta Vigo (27 October 2013)
- Highest scoring: Real Madrid 7–3 Sevilla (30 October 2013)
- Longest winning run: 9 matches Atlético Madrid
- Longest unbeaten run: 18 matches Real Madrid
- Longest winless run: 14 matches Real Betis
- Longest losing run: 6 matches Rayo Vallecano
- Highest attendance: 98,761; Barcelona 2–1 Real Madrid (26 October 2013)
- Lowest attendance: 500; Getafe 2–2 Real Sociedad (19 January 2014)
- Average attendance: 26,702

The 2013–14 La Liga season (known as the Liga BBVA for sponsorship reasons) was the 83rd since its establishment. Matchdays were drawn on 9 July 2013. The season began on 17 August 2013 and concluded on 18 May 2014; all top-flight European leagues ended earlier than the previous season due to the upcoming 2014 FIFA World Cup. Elche, Villarreal and Almería competed in La Liga this season after being promoted from the second tier.

Atlético Madrid, Real Madrid and Barcelona traded the lead several times throughout the season. Entering the final weekend of play, Atlético Madrid were three points ahead of 2013 champions Barcelona. However, with the two teams facing off, Barcelona could claim the title with a win. The game ended in a draw, giving the Colchoneros their first league title in eighteen years, and their tenth overall. It was the first time since the 2003–04 season that a club other than Barcelona or Real Madrid, who finished second and third respectively, had won the title. Osasuna, Valladolid and Real Betis finished in the bottom three and were relegated.

Cristiano Ronaldo won the La Liga Award for Best Player for the first time. As the top scorer with 31 goals, Ronaldo also won the Pichichi Trophy, along with sharing the European Golden Shoe. Ángel Di María had the most assists, with 17. Thibaut Courtois won the Zamora Trophy for best goalkeeper.

== Teams ==
=== Promotion and relegation (pre-season) ===
A total of twenty teams contested the league, including seventeen sides from the 2012–13 season and three promoted from the 2012–13 Segunda División. This included the top two ranked teams from the Segunda División, and the victorious team of the play-offs.

Mallorca, Deportivo La Coruña and Zaragoza were relegated to the 2013–14 Segunda División at the end of the previous season; Mallorca were relegated after sixteen years in La Liga, the longest period in the club's history, Zaragoza returned to the Segunda División after a four-year tenure in La Liga, and Deportivo made an immediate return to the second tier after being promoted the previous year. All three teams were relegated on the final matchday.

The three relegated teams were replaced by three 2012–13 Segunda División sides: Elche returned to the top level as Segunda División champions, after 24 years of absence and having spent the last fourteen consecutive seasons in the Segunda División. Second-placed Villarreal were also promoted to La Liga, making an immediate return to the top flight after a win over Almería in a decisive match near the end of the season which would see the winners directly promoted to La Liga. Almería themselves also eventually achieved promotion; the club returned to the Spanish top flight after spending two years in the Segunda by defeating Girona in the final of the promotion play-offs.

This was the first season since the 1988–89 campaign without any teams from the archipelagos of Spain (teams located on the Balearic Islands and Canary Islands) in the top flight, as Mallorca were relegated and Las Palmas failed to return to La Liga after losing in the semi-finals of the promotion play-offs.

=== Stadium and locations ===
Location of teams in 2013–14 La Liga

Team	Location of stadium	Stadium	Capacity
Almería	Almería	Juegos Mediterráneos	22,000
Athletic Bilbao	Bilbao	San Mamés	53,332
Atlético Madrid	Madrid	Vicente Calderón	54,851
Barcelona	Barcelona	Camp Nou	99,354
Celta Vigo	Vigo	Balaídos	31,800
Elche	Elche	Martínez Valero	36,017
Espanyol	Barcelona	Estadi Cornellà-El Prat	40,500
Getafe	Getafe	Coliseum Alfonso Pérez	17,700
Granada	Granada	Nuevo Los Cármenes	22,524
Levante	Valencia	Ciutat de València	25,534
Málaga	Málaga	La Rosaleda	30,044
Osasuna	Pamplona	El Sadar	19,553
Rayo Vallecano	Madrid	Campo de Vallecas	15,489
Real Betis	Seville	Benito Villamarín	52,500
Real Madrid	Madrid	Santiago Bernabéu	85,454
Real Sociedad	San Sebastián	Anoeta	32,076
Sevilla	Seville	Ramón Sánchez Pizjuán	45,500
Valencia	Valencia	Mestalla	55,000
Valladolid	Valladolid	José Zorrilla	26,512
Villarreal	Villarreal	El Madrigal	24,890

=== Personnel and sponsorship ===
Team	Head coach	Captain	Kit manufacturer	Shirt sponsor
Almería	(Spain) Francisco Rodríguez	(Spain) Corona	Nike	Urcisol.com
Athletic Bilbao	(Spain) Ernesto Valverde	(Spain) Carlos Gurpegui	Nike	Petronor
Atlético Madrid	(Argentina) Diego Simeone	(Spain) Gabi	Nike	SOCAR and Kyocera^{2}
Barcelona	(Argentina) Gerardo Martino	(Spain) Carles Puyol	Nike	Qatar Airways and UNICEF^{2} ^{3}
Celta Vigo	(Spain) Luis Enrique	(Spain) Borja Oubiña	Adidas	Citroën^{4}, Estrella Galicia^{2} ^{4} and Grupo Recalvi^{2}
Elche	(Spain) Fran Escribá	(Spain) Sergio Mantecón	Acerbis	Gioseppo
Espanyol	(Mexico) Javier Aguirre	(Spain) Sergio García	Puma	Cancún
Getafe	(Romania) Cosmin Contra	(Spain) Jaime Gavilán	Joma	Confremar and IG Markets^{4}
Granada	(Spain) Lucas Alcaraz	(Spain) Diego Mainz	Luanvi	Caja Granada
Levante	(Spain) Joaquín Caparrós	(Spain) Juanfran	Kelme	Comunitat Valenciana
Málaga	(Germany) Bernd Schuster	(Portugal) Duda	Nike	UNESCO^{5} and BlueBay resorts^{2}
Osasuna	(Spain) Javi Gracia	(Spain) Patxi Puñal	Adidas	Lacturale and Nevir^{2}
Rayo Vallecano	(Spain) Paco Jémez	(Spain) Roberto Trashorras	Erreà	Adquisiciones Empresariales and Nevir^{2}
Real Betis	(Argentina) Gabriel Calderón	(Spain) Nacho	Macron	Cirsa and Andalucía^{4}
Real Madrid	(Italy) Carlo Ancelotti	(Spain) Iker Casillas	Adidas	Fly Emirates
Real Sociedad	(Spain) Jagoba Arrasate	(Spain) Xabi Prieto	Nike	Canal+ and Kutxa^{2}
Sevilla	(Spain) Unai Emery	(Argentina) Federico Fazio	Warrior	Interwetten
Valencia	(Spain) Juan Antonio Pizzi	(Portugal) Ricardo Costa	Joma	JinKO Solar
Valladolid	(Spain) Juan Ignacio Martínez	(Spain) Javier Baraja	Hummel	El Norte de Castilla^{4}
Villarreal	(Spain) Marcelino	(Spain) Bruno	Xtep	Pamesa Cerámica

2. On the back of shirt.
3. Barcelona made a donation to UNICEF in order to display the charity's logo on the back of the club's kit.
4. On the shorts.
5. Málaga made a donation to UNESCO in order to display the charity's logo on the club's kit.

As in the previous years, Nike provided the official ball for all matches, with a new Nike Incyte Liga BBVA model being used throughout the season for all matches.

=== Managerial changes ===
Team	Outgoing manager	Manner of departure	Date of vacancy	Position in table	Replaced by	Date of appointment
Málaga	(Chile) Manuel Pellegrini	Mutual consent	2 June 2013	Pre-season	(Germany) Bernd Schuster	12 June 2013
Valladolid	(Serbia) Miroslav Đukić	Mutual consent	2 June 2013	Pre-season	(Spain) Juan Ignacio Martínez	17 June 2013
Real Madrid	(Portugal) José Mourinho	Mutual consent	2 June 2013	Pre-season	(Italy) Carlo Ancelotti	25 June 2013
Celta Vigo	(Spain) Abel Resino	Mutual consent	8 June 2013	Pre-season	(Spain) Luis Enrique	8 June 2013
Almería	(Spain) Javi Gracia	Mutual consent	28 June 2013	Pre-season	(Spain) Francisco	29 June 2013
Valencia	(Spain) Ernesto Valverde	End of contract	30 June 2013	Pre-season	(Serbia) Miroslav Đukić	4 June 2013^{1}
Real Sociedad	(France) Philippe Montanier	End of contract	30 June 2013	Pre-season	(Spain) Jagoba Arrasate	8 June 2013^{1}
Levante	(Spain) Juan Ignacio Martínez	End of contract	30 June 2013	Pre-season	(Spain) Joaquín Caparrós	10 June 2013^{1}
Athletic Bilbao	(Argentina) Marcelo Bielsa	End of contract	30 June 2013	Pre-season	(Spain) Ernesto Valverde	21 June 2013^{1}
Barcelona	(Spain) Tito Vilanova	Resigned	19 July 2013	Pre-season	(Argentina) Gerardo Martino	23 July 2013
Osasuna	(Spain) José Luis Mendilibar	Sacked	3 September 2013	20th	(Spain) Javi Gracia	4 September 2013
Real Betis	(Spain) Pepe Mel	Sacked	2 December 2013	20th	(Spain) Juan Carlos Garrido	2 December 2013
Valencia	(Serbia) Miroslav Đukić	Sacked	16 December 2013	9th	(Spain) Juan Antonio Pizzi	26 December 2013
Real Betis	(Spain) Juan Carlos Garrido	Sacked	19 January 2014	20th	(Argentina) Gabriel Calderón	19 January 2014
Getafe	(Spain) Luis García Plaza	Sacked	10 March 2014	15th	(Romania) Cosmin Contra	10 March 2014

Notes

1. Announcement date. The appointment was made effective since 1 July 2013.

== Season summary ==
The 2013–14 La Liga season was the 83rd since its establishment. Match days were drawn on 9 July 2013. The season began on 17 August 2013 and ended on 18 May 2014.

For the first time since 1951 and just the third time in league history, the La Liga title came down to a head-to-head match on the final weekend of play. Atlético Madrid were three points ahead of 2013 champion Barcelona, but had its final game on the road in Barcelona. Barcelona took a 1–0 lead into the half and Atlético lost two starters to injury in the half. A second half header, however, secured a 1–1 draw, earning the Colchoneros their first league title in 18 years, and their 10th overall. It was the first time since the 2003–04 La Liga that a club other than Barcelona or Real Madrid, which finished tied for second, won the title. It was also the first time in the 67-year history of the Camp Nou stadium that a visiting team had clinched the title in the stadium.

The emergence of Diego Costa and Koke was a large part of Atlético Madrid's success. Costa scored 36 goals on the season (27 in league play), including the winner in Atlético's first victory over Real Madrid since 1999. Koke had 18 assists on the year (13 in league play), to go with seven goals.

Earlier in the season, Lionel Messi scored a hat-trick as Barcelona ended a 31-match unbeaten streak for Real Madrid. The same day, Atlético beat Real Betis to claim the league lead. A loss against Levante and draw against Málaga left Atlético vulnerable heading into their final match.

Cristiano Ronaldo won the league scoring title with 31 goals. Messi was second and Costa third. Ángel Di María had most assists with 17. Thibaut Courtois won the Ricardo Zamora Trophy for best goalkeeper. Barcelona was the least penalised team.

== League table ==
Pos	Team	Pld	W	D	L	GF	GA	GD	Pts	Qualification or relegation
1	Atlético Madrid (C)	38	28	6	4	77	26	+51	90	Qualification for the Champions League group stage
2	Barcelona	38	27	6	5	100	33	+67	87 (Note: Barcelona finished ahead of Real Madrid on head-to-head points: Barcelona 2–1 Real Madrid, Real Madrid 3–4 Barcelona.)	Qualification for the Champions League group stage
3	Real Madrid	38	27	6	5	104	38	+66	87	Qualification for the Champions League group stage
4	Athletic Bilbao	38	20	10	8	66	39	+27	70	Qualification for the Champions League play-off round
5	Sevilla	38	18	9	11	69	52	+17	63	Qualification for the Europa League group stage (Note: Sevilla automatically qualified for the 2014–15 UEFA Europa League group stage as the defending champions; the berth through their league position was vacated.)
6	Villarreal	38	17	8	13	60	44	+16	59 (Note: Villarreal finished ahead of Real Sociedad on head-to-head points: Villarreal 5–1 Real Sociedad, Real Sociedad 1–2 Villarreal.)	Qualification for the Europa League play-off round (Note: Since both the 2013–14 Copa del Rey champions (Real Madrid) and runners-up (Barcelona) qualified for the 2014–15 UEFA Champions League, the 5th, 6th and 7th placed teams qualified for the group stage, play-off round and third qualifying round of the 2014–15 UEFA Europa League respectively.)
7	Real Sociedad	38	16	11	11	62	55	+7	59	Qualification for the Europa League third qualifying round
8	Valencia	38	13	10	15	51	53	−2	49	
9	Celta Vigo	38	14	7	17	49	54	−5	49	
10	Levante	38	12	12	14	35	43	−8	48	
11	Málaga	38	12	9	17	39	46	−7	45	
12	Rayo Vallecano	38	13	4	21	46	80	−34	43	
13	Getafe	38	11	9	18	35	54	−19	42	
14	Espanyol	38	11	9	18	41	51	−10	42	
15	Granada	38	12	5	21	32	56	−24	41	
16	Elche	38	9	13	16	30	50	−20	40 (Note: Elche finished ahead of Almería on head-to-head points: Elche 1–0 Almería, Almería 2–2 Elche.)	
17	Almería	38	11	7	20	43	71	−28	40	
18	Osasuna (R)	38	10	9	19	32	62	−30	39	Relegation to Segunda División
19	Valladolid (R)	38	7	15	16	38	60	−22	36	Relegation to Segunda División
20	Real Betis (R)	38	6	7	25	36	78	−42	25	Relegation to Segunda División

Source: La Liga, ESPN
Rules for classification: 1st points; 2nd head-to-head points;
(C) Champions; (R) Relegated

== Results ==
Home \ Away	ALM	ATH	ATM	FCB	CEL	ELC	ESP	GET	GCF	LEV	MCF	OSA	RVA	BET	RMA	RSO	SFC	VCF	VLD	VIL
Almería		0–0	2–0	0–2	2–4	2–2	0–0	1–0	3–0	2–2	0–0	1–2	0–1	3–2	0–5	4–3	1–3	2–2	1–0	2–3
Athletic Bilbao	6–1		1–2	1–0	3–2	2–2	1–2	1–0	4–0	2–1	3–0	2–0	2–1	2–1	1–1	1–1	3–1	1–1	4–2	2–0
Atlético Madrid	4–2	2–0		0–0	2–1	2–0	1–0	7–0	1–0	3–2	1–1	2–1	5–0	5–0	2–2	4–0	1–1	3–0	3–0	1–0
Barcelona	4–1	2–1	1–1		3–0	4–0	1–0	2–2	4–0	7–0	3–0	7–0	6–0	3–1	2–1	4–1	3–2	2–3	4–1	2–1
Celta Vigo	3–1	0–0	0–2	0–3		0–1	2–2	1–1	1–1	0–1	0–2	1–1	0–2	4–2	2–0	2–2	1–0	2–1	4–1	0–0
Elche	1–0	0–0	0–2	0–0	1–0		2–1	1–0	0–1	1–1	0–1	0–0	2–0	0–0	1–2	1–1	1–1	2–1	0–0	0–1
Espanyol	1–2	3–2	1–0	0–1	1–0	3–1		0–2	1–0	0–0	0–0	1–1	2–2	0–0	0–1	1–2	1–3	3–1	4–2	1–2
Getafe	2–2	0–1	0–2	2–5	2–0	1–1	0–0		3–3	1–0	1–0	2–1	0–1	3–1	0–3	2–2	1–0	0–1	0–0	0–1
Granada	0–2	2–0	1–2	1–0	1–2	1–0	0–1	0–2		0–2	3–1	0–0	0–3	1–0	0–1	1–3	1–2	0–1	4–0	2–0
Levante	1–0	1–2	2–0	1–1	0–1	2–1	3–0	0–0	0–1		1–0	2–0	0–0	1–3	2–3	0–0	0–0	2–0	1–1	0–3
Málaga	2–0	1–2	0–1	0–1	0–5	0–1	1–2	1–0	4–1	1–0		0–1	5–0	3–2	0–1	0–1	3–2	0–0	1–1	2–0
Osasuna	0–1	1–5	3–0	0–0	0–2	2–1	1–0	2–0	1–2	0–1	0–2		3–1	2–1	2–2	1–1	1–2	1–1	0–0	0–3
Rayo Vallecano	3–1	0–3	2–4	0–4	3–0	3–0	1–4	1–2	0–2	1–2	4–1	1–0		3–1	2–3	1–0	0–1	1–0	0–3	2–5
Real Betis	0–1	0–2	0–2	1–4	1–2	1–2	2–0	2–0	0–0	0–0	1–2	1–2	2–2		0–5	0–1	0–2	3–1	4–3	1–0
Real Madrid	4–0	3–1	0–1	3–4	3–0	3–0	3–1	4–1	2–0	3–0	2–0	4–0	5–0	2–1		5–1	7–3	2–2	4–0	4–2
Real Sociedad	3–0	2–0	1–2	3–1	4–3	4–0	2–1	2–0	1–1	0–0	0–0	5–0	2–3	5–1	0–4		1–1	1–0	1–0	1–2
Sevilla	2–1	1–1	1–3	1–4	0–1	3–1	4–1	3–0	4–0	2–3	2–2	2–1	4–1	4–0	2–1	1–0		0–0	4–1	0–0
Valencia	1–2	1–1	0–1	2–3	2–1	2–1	2–2	1–3	2–1	2–0	1–0	3–0	1–0	5–0	2–3	1–2	3–1		2–2	2–1
Valladolid	1–0	1–2	0–2	1–0	3–0	2–2	1–0	1–0	0–1	1–1	2–2	0–1	1–1	0–0	1–1	2–2	2–2	0–0		1–0
Villarreal	2–0	1–1	1–1	2–3	0–2	1–1	2–1	0–2	3–0	1–0	1–1	3–1	4–0	1–1	2–2	5–1	1–2	4–1	2–1	

Source: LFP
Legend: Blue = home team win; Yellow = draw; Red = away team win.

== Season statistics ==
=== Top goalscorers ===
The Pichichi Trophy is awarded by newspaper Marca to the player who scores the most goals in a season.

Rank	Player	Club	Goals
1	(Portugal) Cristiano Ronaldo	Real Madrid	31
2	(Argentina) Lionel Messi	Barcelona	28
3	(Spain) Diego Costa	Atlético Madrid	27
4	(Chile) Alexis Sánchez	Barcelona	19
5	(France) Karim Benzema	Real Madrid	17
6	(Spain) Aritz Aduriz	Athletic Bilbao	16
6	(France) Antoine Griezmann	Real Sociedad	16
6	(Mexico) Carlos Vela	Real Sociedad	16
9	(Wales) Gareth Bale	Real Madrid	15
9	(France) Kevin Gameiro	Sevilla	15
9	(Spain) Javi Guerra	Valladolid	15
9	(Spain) Pedro	Barcelona	15

=== Top assists ===
Rank	Player	Club	Assists
1	(Argentina) Ángel Di María	Real Madrid	17
2	(Spain) Cesc Fàbregas	Barcelona	14
2	(Spain) Koke	Atlético Madrid	14
4	(Wales) Gareth Bale	Real Madrid	13
5	(Spain) Markel Susaeta	Athletic Bilbao	12
5	(Mexico) Carlos Vela	Real Sociedad	12
7	(Argentina) Lionel Messi	Barcelona	11
8	(Croatia) Ivan Rakitić	Sevilla	10
8	(Chile) Alexis Sánchez	Barcelona	10
10	(France) Karim Benzema	Real Madrid	9
10	(Portugal) Cristiano Ronaldo	Real Madrid	9

=== Zamora Trophy ===
The Ricardo Zamora Trophy is awarded by newspaper Marca to the goalkeeper with the lowest ratio of goals conceded to matches played. A goalkeeper had to play at least 28 matches of 60 or more minutes to be eligible for the trophy.

Rank	Player	Club	Goals against	Matches	Average
1	(Belgium) Thibaut Courtois	Atlético Madrid	24	37	0.65
2	(Spain) Gorka Iraizoz	Athletic Bilbao	32	33	0.97
3	(Spain) Diego López	Real Madrid	36	36	1
4	(Costa Rica) Keylor Navas	Levante	39	36	1.08
5	(Spain) Sergio Asenjo	Villarreal	41	35	1.17

=== Hat-tricks ===
Player	For	Against	Result	Date
(Argentina) Lionel Messi	Barcelona	Valencia	3–2 (A)	1 September 2013
(Morocco) Mounir El Hamdaoui	Málaga	Rayo Vallecano	5–0 (H)	15 September 2013
(Spain) Pedro	Barcelona	Rayo Vallecano	4–0 (A)	21 September 2013
(Portugal) Cristiano Ronaldo	Real Madrid	Sevilla	7–3 (H)	30 October 2013
(Morocco) Youssef El-Arabi	Granada	Málaga	3–1 (H)	8 November 2013
(Portugal) Cristiano Ronaldo	Real Madrid	Real Sociedad	5–1 (H)	9 November 2013
(Mexico) Carlos Vela^{4}	Real Sociedad	Celta Vigo	4–3 (H)	23 November 2013
(Spain) Sergio García	Espanyol	Rayo Vallecano	4–1 (A)	24 November 2013
(Wales) Gareth Bale	Real Madrid	Valladolid	4–0 (H)	30 November 2013
(Brazil) Jonas	Valencia	Osasuna	3–0 (H)	1 December 2013
(Spain) Javi Guerra	Valladolid	Celta Vigo	3–0 (H)	16 December 2013
(Spain) Pedro	Barcelona	Getafe	5–2 (A)	22 December 2013
(Chile) Alexis Sánchez	Barcelona	Elche	4–0 (H)	5 January 2014
(Nigeria) Ikechukwu Uche	Villarreal	Rayo Vallecano	5–2 (A)	6 January 2014
(Spain) Aritz Aduriz	Athletic Bilbao	Granada	4–0 (H)	28 February 2014
(Argentina) Lionel Messi	Barcelona	Osasuna	7–0 (H)	16 March 2014
(Argentina) Lionel Messi	Barcelona	Real Madrid	4–3 (A)	23 March 2014

^{4} Player scored four goals
^{5} Player scored five goals
(H) – Home; (A) – Away

=== Discipline ===
- Most yellow cards (club): 102
  - Málaga
- Most yellow cards (player): 15
  - Alberto Botía (Elche)
- Most red cards (club): 8
  - Real Betis
  - Rayo Vallecano
  - Osasuna
- Most red cards (player): 2
  - 6 players

== Attendances ==
Pos	Team	Total	High	Low	Average	Change
1	Barcelona	1,366,658	98,761	56,455	71,929	−4.8%
2	Real Madrid	1,356,434	85,454	51,653	71,391	+2.4%
3	Atlético Madrid	881,149	55,000	30,000	46,376	+6.5%
4	Valencia	667,663	45,000	25,860	35,140	+2.0%
5	Athletic Bilbao	638,316	36,550	16,000	33,596	+3.6%^{2}
6	Sevilla	583,115	45,000	23,483	30,690	−5.1%
7	Real Betis	574,610	42,421	12,958	30,243	−19.5%
8	Elche	476,063	33,069	19,124	25,056	+71.6%^{1}
9	Real Sociedad	442,275	30,485	10,492	23,278	+2.8%
10	Málaga	426,762	30,377	15,102	22,461	−6.1%
11	Celta Vigo	399,849	29,457	14,636	21,045	+21.0%
12	Espanyol	373,223	32,131	12,650	19,643	−6.1%
13	Villarreal	309,317	23,852	8,000	16,280	+52.0%^{1}
14	Valladolid	293,983	25,133	6,594	15,473	−6.7%
15	Granada	291,738	20,445	11,536	15,355	−24.4%
16	Levante	290,664	24,102	10,115	15,298	−0.7%
17	Osasuna	282,379	19,714	11,109	14,862	−1.0%
18	Almería	194,111	13,605	8,692	10,216	+32.4%^{1}
19	Rayo Vallecano	193,113	13,874	6,395	10,164	−2.7%
20	Getafe	129,640	16,000	500	6,823	−32.2%
	League total	10,171,062	98,761	500	26,766	−9.1%

Source: Official websites and other Spanish media
Notes:
Attendance numbers without playoff matches.
1: Team played last season in Segunda División
2: Athletic Bilbao played game 1 in Anoeta, with an attendance of 16,000.

== Awards ==
=== Seasonal ===
La Liga's governing body, the Liga Nacional de Fútbol Profesional, honoured the competition's best players and coach with the La Liga Awards.

Award	Recipient
Best Player	(Portugal) Cristiano Ronaldo (Real Madrid)
Best Coach	(Argentina) Diego Simeone (Atlético Madrid)
Best Goalkeeper	(Costa Rica) Keylor Navas (Levante)
Best Defender	(Spain) Sergio Ramos (Real Madrid)
Best Midfielders	(Croatia) Luka Modrić (Real Madrid) (Spain) Andrés Iniesta (Barcelona)
Best Forward	(Portugal) Cristiano Ronaldo (Real Madrid)

=== Team of the Year ===

Team of the Year
Goalkeeper	(Belgium) Thibaut Courtois (Atlético Madrid)			
Defence	(Spain) Juanfran (Atlético Madrid)	(France) Aymeric Laporte (Athletic Bilbao)	(Uruguay) Diego Godín (Atlético Madrid)	(Brazil) Filipe Luís (Atlético Madrid)
Midfield	(Spain) Ander Iturraspe (Athletic Bilbao)		(Spain) Gabi (Atlético Madrid)	(Spain) Koke (Atlético Madrid)
Attack	(Croatia) Ivan Rakitić (Sevilla)		(Spain) Diego Costa (Atlético Madrid)	(Portugal) Cristiano Ronaldo (Real Madrid)

=== Monthly ===
Month	Manager of the Month		Player of the Month		Ref.
Month	Manager	Club	Player	Club	Ref.
September	(Spain) Marcelino	Villarreal	(Spain) Diego Costa	Atlético Madrid	
October	(Argentina) Diego Simeone	Atlético Madrid	(Spain) Koke	Atlético Madrid	
November	(Spain) Francisco	Almería	(Portugal) Cristiano Ronaldo	Real Madrid	
December	(Spain) Jagoba Arrasate	Real Sociedad	(Mexico) Carlos Vela	Real Sociedad	
January	(Spain) Ernesto Valverde	Athletic Bilbao	(Croatia) Ivan Rakitić	Sevilla	
February	(Spain) Juan Antonio Pizzi	Valencia	(Brazil) Rafinha	Celta Vigo	
March	(Spain) Unai Emery	Sevilla	(Costa Rica) Keylor Navas	Levante	
April	(Spain) Paco Jémez	Rayo Vallecano	(Uruguay) Diego Godín	Atlético Madrid	
May	(Spain) Francisco	Almería	(Uruguay) Diego Godín	Atlético Madrid	

== See also ==
- List of Spanish football transfers summer 2013
- 2013–14 Segunda División
- 2013–14 Copa del Rey
