= 1993–94 Albacete Balompié season =

Albacete Balompié
1993–94 season
- President: José Vicente García Palazón
- Manager: Víctor Espárrago
- Stadium: Carlos Belmonte
- La Liga: 13th
- Copa del Rey: Fourth round
- Top goalscorer: League: José María Menéndez (12); All: José María Menéndez (13)

The 1993–94 season was the 53rd season in Albacete Balompié's history.

== Squad ==
Retrieved on 1 February 2021

Note: Flags indicate national team as defined under FIFA eligibility rules; some limited exceptions apply. Players may hold more than one non-FIFA nationality.

No.	Pos.	Nation	Player
—	GK	ESP	Juan Carlos Balaguer
—	GK	CRC	Luis Conejo
—	DF	ESP	Coco
—	DF	YUG	Vladan Dimitrijević
—	DF	ESP	Esteve Fradera
—	DF	ESP	Delfí Geli
—	DF	ESP	Juan Ángel Madrigal
—	DF	ESP	Magín
—	DF	ESP	Sócrates Parri
—	DF	ESP	Alejandro Rodríguez
—	DF	ESP	Santi
—	DF	ESP	Sotero López
—	MF	CRO	Nenad Bjelica

No.	Pos.	Nation	Player
—	MF	ESP	Juan Antonio Chesa
—	MF	ESP	Pedro Cordero
—	MF	ESP	José María Menéndez
—	MF	ESP	Alberto Monteagudo
—	MF	ESP	Josep Sala
—	MF	URU	José Luis Zalazar
—	FW	ESP	Antonio
—	FW	URU	Raúl Dos Santos
—	FW	ESP	José González
—	FW	ESP	Fernando Morientes
—	FW	BRA	Nílson
—	FW	ESP	Ramón

=== Out on loan ===
Note: Flags indicate national team as defined under FIFA eligibility rules; some limited exceptions apply. Players may hold more than one non-FIFA nationality.

No.	Pos.	Nation	Player
—	GK	ESP	Fernando Marcos (on loan at Cartagena FC)
—	DF	ESP	Javier Oliete (on loan at Celta Vigo)

No.	Pos.	Nation	Player
—	MF	ESP	Ángel Brau (on loan at Hellín Deportivo)

=== Transfers ===
==== In ====
Pos	Player	From	Notes
Summer
DF	(Federal Republic of Yugoslavia) Vladan Dimitrijević	(Spain) Figueres	
DF	(Spain) Esteve Fradera	(Spain) Real Mallorca	
DF	(Spain) Magín	(Spain) Cartagena FC	
DF	(Spain) Alejandro Rodríguez	(Spain) Real Burgos	
MF	(Spain) Josep Sala	(Spain) Real Mallorca	
FW	(Spain) José González	(Spain) Real Mallorca	
FW	(Brazil) Nílson	(Brazil) Fluminense	
FW	(Spain) Ramón	(Spain) Deportivo La Coruña	

==== Out ====
Pos	Player	To	Notes
Summer
GK	(Spain) Fernando Marcos	(Spain) Cartagena FC	Loan
GK	(Spain) Jesús Unanua	(Spain) Osasuna	Loan return
DF	(Spain) Javier Oliete	(Spain) Celta Vigo	Loan
DF	(Spain) Armando Tejera	(Spain) Granada CF	
MF	(Spain) Catali	(Spain) Toledo	
MF	(Spain) Manolo Salvador	(Spain) Atlético Marbella	
MF	(Spain) Julio Soler	(Spain) Real Betis	
FW	(Spain) Pedro Corbalán	(Spain) Real Murcia	
FW	(Spain) Antonio Pinilla	(Spain) Barcelona	Loan return

== Squad stats ==
Last updated on 1 February 2021.

No.	Pos	Nat	Player	Total		La Liga		Copa del Rey	
No.	Pos	Nat	Player	Apps	Goals	Apps	Goals	Apps	Goals
	GK	(Spain) ESP	Juan Carlos Balaguer	28	0	26	0	2	0
	GK	(Costa Rica) CRC	Luis Conejo	12	0	12	0	0	0
	DF	(Spain) ESP	Coco	37	1	35	1	2	0
	DF	(Federal Republic of Yugoslavia) YUG	Vladan Dimitrijević	2	0	1+1	0	0	0
	DF	(Spain) ESP	Esteve Fradera	39	0	37	0	2	0
	DF	(Spain) ESP	Delfí Geli	37	5	36	5	0+1	0
	DF	(Spain) ESP	Juan Ángel Madrigal	1	0	0	0	1	0
	DF	(Spain) ESP	Magín	9	0	2+7	0	0	0
	DF	(Spain) ESP	Sócrates Parri	0	0	0	0	0	0
	DF	(Spain) ESP	Alejandro Rodríguez	34	1	31+2	1	1	0
	DF	(Spain) ESP	Santi	34	0	32+2	0	0	0
	DF	(Spain) ESP	Sotero López	7	0	4+1	0	2	0
	MF	(Croatia) CRO	Nenad Bjelica	3	0	1	0	1+1	0
	MF	(Spain) ESP	Juan Antonio Chesa	24	0	10+12	0	2	0
	MF	(Spain) ESP	Pedro Cordero	26	1	20+5	1	1	0
	MF	(Spain) ESP	José María Menéndez	36	13	32+3	12	1	1
	MF	(Spain) ESP	Alberto Monteagudo	0	0	0	0	0	0
	MF	(Spain) ESP	Josep Sala	38	2	37	2	1	0
	MF	(Uruguay) URU	José Luis Zalazar	33	8	28+3	8	2	0
	FW	(Spain) ESP	Antonio	29	1	16+13	1	0	0
	FW	(Uruguay) URU	Raúl Dos Santos	31	12	29+1	10	1	2
	FW	(Spain) ESP	José González	11	0	5+5	0	1	0
	FW	(Spain) ESP	Fernando Morientes	4	1	0+2	0	0+2	1
	FW	(Brazil) BRA	Nílson	25	8	24+1	8	0	0
	FW	(Spain) ESP	Ramón	19	0	0+17	0	2	0

== Competitions ==
=== Overall ===
Competition	Final position
La Liga	13th
Copa del Rey	Fourth round

=== La Liga ===
==== League table ====
Pos	Team	Pld	W	D	L	GF	GA	GD	Pts
11	Real Sociedad	38	12	12	14	39	47	−8	36 (Note: TEN 2–1 RSO; RSO 2–1 TEN)
12	Atlético Madrid	38	13	9	16	54	54	0	35 (Note: ATM: 5 pts; ALB: 4 pts; SPG: 3 pts)
13	Albacete	38	10	15	13	49	58	−9	35
14	Sporting Gijón	38	15	5	18	42	57	−15	35
15	Celta Vigo	38	11	11	16	41	51	−10	33 (Note: CEL 2–0 LOG; LOG 1–1 CEL)

Source: LFP
Rules for classification: 1) points; 2) head-to-head points; 3) head-to-head goal difference; 4) head-to-head goals scored; 5) goal difference; 6) number of goals scored.

==== Matches ====
Win Draw Loss

Match	Opponent	Venue	Result
1	Athletic Bilbao	A	1–4
2	Barcelona	H	0–0
3	Real Zaragoza	A	1–1
4	Osasuna	H	2–1
5	Real Valladolid	A	0–1
6	Deportivo La Coruña	H	0–0
7	Real Oviedo	A	1–1
8	Atlético Madrid	H	2–2
9	Racing Santander	A	1–1
10	Tenerife	H	2–3
11	Lleida	A	1–0
12	Rayo Vallecano	H	1–1
13	Logroñés	A	2–2
14	Valencia	H	3–1
15	Celta Vigo	A	4–1
16	Sporting de Gijón	H	3–1
17	Real Madrid	A	0–2
18	Sevilla	H	2–2
19	Real Sociedad	A	1–1

Match	Opponent	Venue	Result
20	Athletic Bilbao	H	1–0
21	Barcelona	A	1–2
22	Real Zaragoza	H	2–1
23	Osasuna	A	1–3
24	Real Valladolid	H	1–1
25	Deportivo La Coruña	A	1–5
26	Real Oviedo	H	5–0
27	Atlético Madrid	A	0–0
28	Racing Santander	H	3–0
29	Tenerife	A	1–2
30	Lleida	H	2–1
31	Rayo Vallecano	A	0–0
32	Logroñés	H	2–2
33	Valencia	A	0–4
34	Celta Vigo	H	0–4
35	Sporting de Gijón	A	0–1
36	Real Madrid	H	1–4
37	Sevilla	A	0–2
38	Real Sociedad	H	1–1

=== Copa del Rey ===
Win Draw Loss

Round	Opponent	Aggregate	Venue	First Leg	Venue	Second Leg
Fourth round	Celta Vigo	4–5	A	0–4	H	4–1
