= 1994–95 Albacete Balompié season =

Albacete Balompié
1994–95 season
- President: José Vicente García Palazón
- Manager: Luis Suárez (to 4 September); Ginés Meléndez (caretaker, 11 September); Benito Floro (from 18 September)
- Stadium: Carlos Belmonte
- La Liga: 17th (qualified for play-offs)
- Copa del Rey: Semi-finals
- Top goalscorer: League: José Luis Zalazar (13); All: José Luis Zalazar (16)

The 1994–95 season was the 54th season in Albacete Balompié's history.

== Squad ==
Retrieved on 21 January 2021

Note: Flags indicate national team as defined under FIFA eligibility rules; some limited exceptions apply. Players may hold more than one non-FIFA nationality.

No.	Pos.	Nation	Player
—	GK	ESP	Alejandro
—	GK	ESP	Juan Carlos Balaguer
—	GK	ESP	Fernando Marcos
—	GK	ESP	José Francisco Molina
—	DF	ESP	Coco
—	DF	ESP	Santi
—	DF	ESP	Esteve Fradera
—	DF	ESP	Magín
—	DF	ESP	Javier Oliete
—	DF	ESP	Alejandro Rodríguez
—	DF	ESP	Mario Romero
—	DF	ESP	Sotero López
—	DF	ESP	Albert Tomàs
—	MF	CRO	Nenad Bjelica

No.	Pos.	Nation	Player
—	MF	ESP	Ángel Brau
—	MF	ESP	Pedro Cordero
—	MF	ESP	Óscar García (on loan from Barcelona)
—	MF	ESP	Manolo Salvador
—	MF	ESP	Alberto Monteagudo
—	MF	ESP	Josep Sala
—	MF	URU	José Luis Zalazar
—	FW	BUL	Ivaylo Andonov
—	FW	ESP	Antonio
—	FW	ARG	Oscar Dertycia
—	FW	URU	Raúl Dos Santos
—	FW	ESP	Gregorio Fonseca
—	FW	ESP	Fernando Morientes

=== Transfers ===
==== In ====
Pos	Player	From	Notes
Summer
GK	(Spain) Fernando Marcos	(Spain) Cartagena FC	Loan return
GK	(Spain) José Francisco Molina	(Spain) Valencia	
DF	(Spain) Javier Oliete	(Spain) Celta Vigo	Loan return
DF	(Spain) Albert Tomàs	(Spain) Lleida	
MF	(Spain) Óscar García	(Spain) Barcelona	Loan
FW	(Bulgaria) Ivaylo Andonov	(Bulgaria) PFC CSKA Sofia	
FW	(Argentina) Oscar Dertycia	(Spain) Tenerife	
Winter
MF	(Spain) Manolo Salvador	(Spain) Atlético Marbella	
FW	(Spain) Gregorio Fonseca	(Spain) Español	

==== Out ====
Pos	Player	To	Notes
Summer
DF	(Federal Republic of Yugoslavia) Vladan Dimitrijević	(Spain) Extremadura	
DF	(Spain) Delfí Geli	(Spain) Atlético Madrid	
DF	(Spain) Sócrates Parri	(Spain) Levante	
MF	(Spain) Juan Antonio Chesa	(Spain) Rayo Vallecano	
MF	(Spain) José María Menéndez	(Spain) Real Betis	Free transfer
FW	(Spain) José González	(Spain) Rayo Vallecano	
FW	(Brazil) Nílson	(Spain) Real Valladolid	
Winter
FW	(Uruguay) Raúl Dos Santos	(Spain) Villarreal	

== Squad stats ==
Last updated on 29 December 2020.

No.	Pos	Nat	Player	Total		La Liga		La Liga play-offs		Copa del Rey	
No.	Pos	Nat	Player	Apps	Goals	Apps	Goals	Apps	Goals	Apps	Goals
	GK	(Spain) ESP	Alejandro	1	0	0+1	0	0	0	0	0
	GK	(Spain) ESP	Juan Carlos Balaguer	5	0	5	0	0	0	0	0
	GK	(Spain) ESP	Fernando Marcos	11	0	10	0	0	0	1	0
	GK	(Spain) ESP	José Francisco Molina	34	0	23	0	2	0	9	0
	DF	(Spain) ESP	Coco	40	0	32	0	1	0	7	0
	DF	(Spain) ESP	Santi	43	2	33	2	2	0	8	0
	DF	(Spain) ESP	Esteve Fradera	44	1	35	1	2	0	6+1	0
	DF	(Spain) ESP	Magín	0	0	0	0	0	0	0	0
	DF	(Spain) ESP	Javier Oliete	16	0	9+4	0	0	0	2+1	0
	DF	(Spain) ESP	Alejandro Rodríguez	14	0	11+1	0	0	0	2	0
	DF	(Spain) ESP	Mario Romero	16	0	10	0	0	0	6	0
	DF	(Spain) ESP	Sotero López	46	0	36	0	2	0	8	0
	DF	(Spain) ESP	Albert Tomàs	23	0	13	0	1	0	8+1	0
	MF	(Croatia) CRO	Nenad Bjelica	43	9	27+4	6	2	1	10	2
	MF	(Spain) ESP	Ángel Brau	0	0	0	0	0	0	0	0
	MF	(Spain) ESP	Pedro Cordero	28	3	9+10	2	2	0	2+5	1
	MF	(Spain) ESP	Óscar García	33	2	27+2	2	0	0	3+1	0
	MF	(Spain) ESP	Manolo Salvador	25	0	17+1	0	2	0	5	0
	MF	(Spain) ESP	Alberto Monteagudo	5	0	3+2	0	0	0	0	0
	MF	(Spain) ESP	Josep Sala	34	1	22+2	0	2	0	8	1
	MF	(Uruguay) URU	José Luis Zalazar	49	16	37	13	2	1	10	2
	FW	(Bulgaria) BUL	Ivaylo Andonov	29	4	19+5	4	1	0	4	0
	FW	(Spain) ESP	Antonio	31	3	12+11	2	0+2	0	2+4	1
	FW	(Argentina) ARG	Oscar Dertycia	32	8	13+13	6	1+1	0	2+2	2
	FW	(Spain) ESP	Gregorio Fonseca	19	2	5+8	0	0	0	1+5	2
	FW	(Spain) ESP	Fernando Morientes	27	7	9+11	5	0+1	0	6	2
Players who have left the club after the start of the season:
	FW	(Uruguay) URU	Raúl Dos Santos	2	1	1+1	1	0	0	0	0

== Competitions ==
=== Overall ===
Competition	Final position
La Liga	17th (lost in play-offs)
Copa del Rey	Semi-finals

1. Despite losing in the La Liga relegation play-offs, Albacete were not relegated due to the administration scandal involving Sevilla and Celta Vigo.

=== La Liga ===
==== League table ====
Pos	Team	Pld	W	D	L	GF	GA	GD	Pts	Qualification or relegation
15	Tenerife	38	13	9	16	57	57	0	35 (Note: TEN 1–0 ATM; ATM 3–1 TEN)	
16	Compostela	38	11	12	15	44	56	−12	34 (Note: ALB 1–3 COM; COM 0–0 ALB)	
17	Albacete (Note: On July 31, 1995, Sevilla and Celta Vigo were relegated to Segunda División B for not providing documentation (an audit) nor making their payments to the Royal Spanish Football Federation within the time limit. The two best qualified teams to be relegated, Albacete and Valladolid were readmitted to La Liga. Later, Sevilla and Celta Vigo claimed that according to the law they had another 15 working days because they made allegations days before. Finally, the solution was to not relegate any involved team and expand the league to 22 teams for the next two seasons.)	38	10	14	14	44	61	−17	34	Qualification for the relegation playoffs
18	Sporting Gijón (O)	38	8	12	18	42	67	−25	28	Qualification for the relegation playoffs
19	Valladolid	38	8	9	21	25	63	−38	25	

Source: LFP
Rules for classification: 1) points; 2) head-to-head points; 3) head-to-head goal difference; 4) head-to-head goals scored; 5) goal difference; 6) number of goals scored.
(O) Play-off winners

==== Matches ====
Win Draw Loss

Match	Opponent	Venue	Result
1	Celta Vigo	H	1–1
2	Real Betis	A	1–4
3	Real Madrid	H	1–1
4	Logroñés	A	1–1
5	Sevilla	A	2–0
6	Athletic Bilbao	H	1–2
7	Sporting de Gijón	A	2–3
8	Racing Santander	H	2–0
9	Español	A	1–5
10	Compostela	H	1–3
11	Real Zaragoza	A	0–1
12	Atlético Madrid	H	2–2
13	Valencia	A	3–3
14	Tenerife	H	2–1
15	Real Sociedad	A	0–2
16	Real Oviedo	H	1–0
17	Real Valladolid	A	1–1
18	Barcelona	H	2–2
19	Deportivo La Coruña	A	1–2

Match	Opponent	Venue	Result
20	Celta Vigo	A	0–0
21	Real Betis	H	3–1
22	Real Madrid	A	0–0
23	Logroñés	H	0–0
24	Sevilla	H	1–1
25	Athletic Bilbao	A	2–1
26	Sporting de Gijón	H	1–2
27	Racing Santander	A	1–2
28	Espanyol	H	1–1
29	Compostela	A	0–0
30	Real Zaragoza	H	0–3
31	Atlético Madrid	A	0–4
32	Valencia	H	1–0
33	Tenerife	A	2–2
34	Real Sociedad	H	0–1
35	Real Oviedo	A	3–1
36	Real Valladolid	H	1–0
37	Barcelona	A	1–0
38	Deportivo La Coruña	H	2–8

==== Relegation play-offs ====
Win Draw Loss

Opponent	Aggregate	Venue	First Leg	Venue	Second Leg
Salamanca	2–5	A	2–0	H	0–5 (a.e.t.)

1. Despite losing in the La Liga relegation play-offs, Albacete were not relegated due to the administration scandal involving Sevilla and Celta Vigo.

=== Copa del Rey ===
Win Draw Loss

Round	Opponent	Aggregate	Venue	First Leg	Venue	Second Leg
Third round	Beasain	3–3 (a)	A	2–3	H	1–0
Fourth round	Sestao Sport	3–1	A	2–1	H	1–0
Round of 16	Real Zaragoza	3–2	H	2–1	A	1–1
Quarter-finals	Atlético Madrid	2–1	A	1–1	H	1–0
Semi-finals	Valencia	2–3	A	1–1	H	1–2
