= 1992–93 Albacete Balompié season =

Albacete Balompié
1992–93 season
- President: Rafael Candel
- Manager: Julián Rubio (to 13 December); Hernán and Ginés Meléndez (joint caretakers, 20 December); Víctor Espárrago (from 3 January)
- Stadium: Carlos Belmonte
- La Liga: 17th (won in playoff)
- Copa del Rey: Round of 16
- Top goalscorer: League: José Luis Zalazar (12); All: Antonio; Antonio Pinilla; José Luis Zalazar (13 each)

The 1992–93 season was the 52nd season in Albacete Balompié's history.

== Squad ==
Retrieved on 3 February 2021

Note: Flags indicate national team as defined under FIFA eligibility rules; some limited exceptions apply. Players may hold more than one non-FIFA nationality.

No.	Pos.	Nation	Player
—	GK	ESP	Juan Carlos Balaguer
—	GK	CRC	Luis Conejo
—	GK	ESP	Fernando Marcos
—	GK	ESP	Óscar
—	GK	ESP	Jesús Unanua (on loan from Osasuna)
—	DF	BRA	Antônio Carlos
—	DF	ESP	Coco
—	DF	ESP	Criubaldo
—	DF	ESP	Delfí Geli
—	DF	ESP	Javier Oliete
—	DF	ESP	Sócrates Parri
—	DF	ESP	Santi
—	DF	ESP	Sotero López
—	DF	ESP	Armando Tejera
—	MF	CRO	Nenad Bjelica

No.	Pos.	Nation	Player
—	MF	URU	Miguel Bossio
—	MF	ESP	Catali (captain)
—	MF	ESP	Juan Antonio Chesa
—	MF	ESP	Pedro Cordero
—	MF	ESP	Manolo Salvador
—	MF	ESP	Alberto Monteagudo
—	MF	ESP	José María Menéndez
—	MF	ESP	Julio Soler
—	MF	URU	José Luis Zalazar
—	FW	ESP	José Aguilera
—	FW	ESP	Antonio
—	FW	ESP	Pedro Corbalán
—	FW	URU	Raúl Dos Santos
—	FW	PAN	Rommel Fernández (on loan from Valencia)
—	FW	ESP	Antonio Pinilla (on loan from Barcelona)

=== Transfers ===
==== In ====
Pos	Player	From	Notes
Summer
GK	(Spain) Jesús Unanua	(Spain) Osasuna	Loan
DF	(Brazil) Antônio Carlos	(Brazil) São Paulo	
DF	(Spain) Armando Tejera	(Spain) Las Palmas	
FW	(Uruguay) Raúl Dos Santos	(Uruguay) Defensor Sporting	
FW	(Panama) Rommel Fernández	(Spain) Valencia	Loan
FW	(Spain) Antonio Pinilla	(Spain) Barcelona	Loan
Winter
MF	(Croatia) Nenad Bjelica	(Croatia) Osijek	
MF	(Spain) Pedro Cordero	(Spain) Cartagena FC	

==== Out ====
Pos	Player	To	Notes
Summer
DF	(Spain) Juan José Juárez	(Spain) Real Murcia	
MF	(Spain) José Luis Cabrero	(Spain) Salamanca	
MF	(Bolivia) Marco Etcheverry	(Chile) Colo-Colo	
MF	(Spain) Pedro Parada	(Spain) Mérida	
FW	(Argentina) Daniel Aquino	(Spain) Mérida	
FW	(Spain) Antonio Camilo	(Spain) Compostela	
FW	(Spain) Ismael Urzaiz	(Spain) Real Madrid	Loan return
Winter
DF	(Brazil) Antônio Carlos	(Brazil) Palmeiras	

== Squad stats ==
Last updated on 4 February 2021.

No.	Pos	Nat	Player	Total		La Liga		La Liga playoff		Copa del Rey	
No.	Pos	Nat	Player	Apps	Goals	Apps	Goals	Apps	Goals	Apps	Goals
	GK	(Spain) ESP	Juan Carlos Balaguer	32	0	25	0	2	0	5	0
	GK	(Costa Rica) CRC	Luis Conejo	0	0	0	0	0	0	0	0
	GK	(Spain) ESP	Fernando Marcos	0	0	0	0	0	0	0	0
	GK	(Spain) ESP	Óscar	0	0	0	0	0	0	0	0
	GK	(Spain) ESP	Jesús Unanua	16	0	13	0	0	0	3	0
	DF	(Spain) ESP	Coco	37	1	30	0	2	0	5	1
	DF	(Spain) ESP	Criubaldo	1	0	0	0	0	0	1	0
	DF	(Spain) ESP	Delfí Geli	43	4	33+2	4	2	0	6	0
	DF	(Spain) ESP	Javier Oliete	14	0	9	0	0	0	5	0
	DF	(Spain) ESP	Sócrates Parri	23	1	18	0	0+1	0	4	1
	DF	(Spain) ESP	Santi	40	0	30+1	0	2	0	6+1	0
	DF	(Spain) ESP	Sotero López	18	0	14+1	0	0	0	2+1	0
	DF	(Spain) ESP	Armando Tejera	18	0	12+1	0	0	0	5	0
	MF	(Croatia) CRO	Nenad Bjelica	10	1	1+6	0	0	0	2+1	1
	MF	(Uruguay) URU	Miguel Bossio	11	0	8+2	0	1	0	0	0
	MF	(Spain) ESP	Catali	20	0	14+2	0	1+1	0	1+1	0
	MF	(Spain) ESP	Juan Antonio Chesa	41	4	29+3	4	2	0	7	0
	MF	(Spain) ESP	Pedro Cordero	10	2	6+2	2	2	0	0	0
	MF	(Spain) ESP	Manolo Salvador	27	0	8+11	0	0+1	0	2+5	0
	MF	(Spain) ESP	José María Menéndez	44	3	34+2	1	2	1	5+1	1
	MF	(Spain) ESP	Alberto Monteagudo	1	0	0	0	0	0	0+1	0
	MF	(Spain) ESP	Julio Soler	26	3	11+9	2	0	0	5+1	1
	MF	(Uruguay) URU	José Luis Zalazar	44	13	36	12	2	0	6	1
	FW	(Spain) ESP	José Aguilera	0	0	0	0	0	0	0	0
	FW	(Spain) ESP	Antonio	38	13	26+5	8	2	2	5	3
	FW	(Spain) ESP	Pedro Corbalán	8	1	1+2	0	0	0	3+2	1
	FW	(Uruguay) URU	Raúl Dos Santos	14	4	8+6	4	0	0	0	0
	FW	(Panama) PAN	Rommel Fernández	20	9	16+2	7	0	0	2	2
	FW	(Spain) ESP	Antonio Pinilla	45	13	26+10	8	2	1	6+1	4
Players who have left the club after the start of the season:
	DF	(Brazil) BRA	Antônio Carlos	14	1	10+2	1	0	0	2	0

== Competitions ==
=== Overall ===
Competition	Final position
La Liga	17th (won in playoff)
Copa del Rey	Round of 16

=== La Liga ===
==== League table ====
Pos	Team	Pld	W	D	L	GF	GA	GD	Pts	Qualification or relegation
15	Logroñés	38	11	11	16	32	48	−16	33 (Note: RVA 2–1 LOG; LOG 0–0 RVA)	
16	Oviedo	38	11	10	17	42	52	−10	32	
17	Albacete (O)	38	11	9	18	54	59	−5	31	Qualification for the relegation playoffs
18	Español (R)	38	9	11	18	40	56	−16	29	Qualification for the relegation playoffs
19	Cádiz (R)	38	5	12	21	30	70	−40	22 (Note: RBU 0–2 CÁD; CÁD 3–2 RBU)	Relegation to the Segunda División

Source: LFP
Rules for classification: 1) points; 2) head-to-head points; 3) head-to-head goal difference; 4) head-to-head goals scored; 5) goal difference; 6) number of goals scored.
(O) Play-off winners; (R) Relegated

==== Matches ====
Win Draw Loss

Match	Opponent	Venue	Result
1	Sevilla	H	3–4
2	Osasuna	A	0–3
3	Real Sociedad	H	1–2
4	Real Madrid	A	0–3
5	Tenerife	H	1–0
6	Barcelona	A	3–3
7	Real Burgos	H	4–0
8	Sporting de Gijón	A	0–1
9	Atlético Madrid	A	2–3
10	Deportivo La Coruña	H	1–1
11	Valencia	A	0–2
12	Logroñés	H	3–1
13	Athletic Bilbao	A	1–3
14	Real Zaragoza	H	1–3
15	Español	A	0–2
16	Cádiz	H	5–0
17	Real Oviedo	A	0–0
18	Rayo Vallecano	H	1–0
19	Celta Vigo	A	1–1

Match	Opponent	Venue	Result
20	Sevilla	A	1–2
21	Osasuna	H	0–0
22	Real Sociedad	A	1–2
23	Real Madrid	H	0–3
24	Tenerife	A	2–2
25	Barcelona	H	0–2
26	Real Burgos	A	0–0
27	Sporting de Gijón	H	6–2
28	Atlético Madrid	H	2–1
29	Deportivo La Coruña	A	2–3
30	Valencia	H	0–1
31	Logroñés	A	0–1
32	Real Zaragoza	A	1–0
33	Español	H	2–0
34	Athletic Bilbao	H	4–5
35	Cádiz	A	1–1
36	Real Oviedo	H	2–0
37	Rayo Vallecano	A	2–2
38	Celta Vigo	H	1–0

==== Relegation playoff ====
Win Draw Loss

Opponent	Aggregate	Venue	First Leg	Venue	Second Leg
Real Mallorca	4–3	A	3–1	H	1–2

=== Copa del Rey ===
Win Draw Loss

Round	Opponent	Aggregate	Venue	First Leg	Venue	Second Leg
Third round	Utebo	6–1	A	1–0	H	5–1
Fourth round	Realejos	5–1	A	3–1	H	2–0
Fifth round	Lugo	3–0	A	3–0	H	0–0
Round of 16	Real Valladolid	2–2 (3–4 p)	A	0–1	H	2–1
