= Mariano Hernán =

Spanish footballer

Hernán
Personal information
- Full name: Mariano Hernán López
- Date of birth: 23 November 1957 (age 68)
- Place of birth: Talarrubias, Spain
- Height: 5 ft 9 in (1.75 m)
- Position: Midfielder

Youth career
- 1970–1977: Real Madrid

Senior career*
Years	Team	Apps	(Gls)
1977–1979	Real Carabanchel		
1979–1980	Díter Zafra	30	(5)
1980–1990	Albacete Balompié	301	(57)
1990–1991	Yeclano	10	(1)
Total		341	(63)

Managerial career
- 1992: Albacete Balompié (caretaker)
- * Club domestic league appearances and goals

Mariano Hernán López (born 23 November 1957), known during his playing career simply as Hernán, is a Spanish retired footballer who played as a midfielder, and later held several non-playing positions at Albacete Balompié.

== Playing career ==
=== Early career ===
Hernán was born in Talarrubias in the province of Badajoz in Extremadura, and spent seven years in the Real Madrid youth teams. He began his senior career in 1977 with Real Carabanchel in the Tercera División, and spent two seasons there before taking a step up with Díter Zafra in 1979.

He made his Segunda División B debut with Díter Zafra on 23 September, coming on at half time in a 2–1 away loss to Lleida at Camp d'Esports. His first appearance had come 11 days prior, in a 5–0 away loss to Atlético Valdemoro in the Copa del Rey. In the next match on 30 September, he made his home debut, once again coming on at half time as Díter Zafra beat Vall de Uxó at Nuevo Estadio de Zafra. In his third match, away to Ceuta at Estadio Alfonso Murube on 7 October, he also came off the bench for the second half, and scored his first goal for the club with 13 minutes remaining. This would prove to be only a consolation, as Ceuta won 3–1.

On 31 October, he started a match for the first time in the return leg of the Valdemoro Copa del Rey tie. Zafra won 2–1, but were eliminated on aggregate. After nine substitute appearances, he finally made his full league debut at home to Racing Portuense on 16 December, a match which Portuense won 1–0. He made a total of 32 appearances that season, scoring five times, but began to fall out of favour towards the end of the campaign, and a substitute appearance in the 4–1 home win over Ontinyent on 25 May would prove to be his last for the club.

=== Albacete Balompié ===
Ahead of the 1980–81 season, Hernán dropped back to the Tercera División with Albacete Balompié. He was an immediate fixture in the starting lineup, making his debut in Albacete's first match of the season, a 2–0 away win over Horadada on 7 September. His home debut came a week later, against Torrevieja at Estadio Carlos Belmonte, with Hernán scoring his first Albacete goal in another 2–0 victory.

He played 33 times that season, scoring a healthy 11 goals. This included two braces: in a 6–1 home win over Ilicitano on 7 December, and a stunning 7–0 away win over Hellín on 8 March. Albacete's good form saw them finish the season in 2nd place, although they lost in the promotion playoffs to Binéfar. The following season saw Hernán make 37 appearances, and contribute 9 goals, as Albacete topped their group. This time they did achieve promotion, beating Aurrerá Ondarroa and Talavera in the playoffs.

Hernán continued to be an integral part of the team after promotion, appearing in every game bar one in both 1982–83 and 1984–85. While he never bettered his goal tally from his debut season, he did score at least eight times in each of Albacete's first three seasons in Segunda División B. In the third season, he helped Albacete to 2nd place and promotion to the Segunda División for the first time since 1961–62.

He made his Segunda División debut in the first match of the season, a 0–0 home draw with Logroñés, playing the first 78 minutes. Although he played 26 times during the campaign, this would be his only season with Albacete in which he failed to score. The team were relegated straight back to Segunda División B at the end of the season, finishing just two points short of safety.

On the club's return to the third tier, Hernán continued to be an important part of the team, but his number of appearances would decline steadily over the following four seasons. In 1989–90, he made just seven appearances, scoring twice, as Albacete won their group and secured promotion once again. However, Hernán would not join them in the Segunda División, as he left the club at the end of the season. A 1–0 home win over Tomelloso, in which he came off the bench in the second half, would prove to be his last for the club. He left Albacete after ten seasons, with 343 appearances and 65 goals in all competitions.

=== Yeclano ===
Hernán stayed in Segunda División B in 1990–91, joining Yeclano, who had just secured promotion after winning their group in the 1989–90 Tercera División. He was not first choice at his new club, and had to wait until 30 September to make his debut, coming on for the last 26 minutes of a 2–0 away loss to Manlleu. His next appearance, and home debut, didn't come until 4 November, as he played the last 11 minutes of Yeclano's 3–1 win over Olímpic de Xàtiva.

He finally made his way into the starting line-up for the 2–1 away win against Cartagena FC at the Cartagonova on 3 March, and kept his place for the home win a week later over Sant Andreu, by the same score line. Ultimately, he made eleven appearances that season in all competitions, scoring just once: in the 5–2 win away at Torrent on 14 April, which was also the only match in which he played the full 90 minutes. He retired from playing at the end of the season, aged 33.

== Coaching career and other roles ==
After retirement, Hernán returned to Albacete as a coach. Having secured a second consecutive promotion in 1990–91, his old club were now enjoying life in La Liga. They placed an excellent 7th in their first top flight campaign, but following a 3–1 home defeat at the hands of Real Zaragoza on 13 December 1992, they slipped into the relegation zone. Head coach Julián Rubio was sacked, and Hernán and Ginés Meléndez were appointed joint caretaker managers.

The pair's only match in charge was away to Espanyol at the Estadi de Sarrià on 20 December, which Albacete lost 2–0. The new permanent coach was Víctor Espárrago, who eventually guided Albacete clear of relegation in 17th place.

Later, Hernán was appointed as Albacete's technical secretary, a post which he left after the 1996–97 season, following the club's relegation from La Liga the previous year. He returned for a second spell as technical secretary ahead of the 2007–08 season.

== Honours ==
Albacete Balompié

- Tercera División: 1981–82
- Segunda División B runners-up: 1984–85 (earning promotion to Segunda División)
- Segunda División B: 1989–90

== Career statistics ==
=== As a player ===
As of 27 December 2020

Club	Season	League			Cup		Other		Total	
Club	Season	Division	Apps	Goals	Apps	Goals	Apps	Goals	Apps	Goals
Real Carabanchel	1977–78	Tercera División	?	?	4	0	–	–	4	0
Real Carabanchel	1978–79	Tercera División	?	?	4	0	–	–	4	0
Real Carabanchel	Total		?	?	8	0	0	0	8	0
Díter Zafra	1979–80	Segunda División B	30	5	2	0	–	–	32	5
Albacete Balompié	1980–81	Tercera División	33	11	4	1	–	–	37	12
Albacete Balompié	1981–82	Tercera División	37	9	2	0	–	–	39	9
Albacete Balompié	1982–83	Segunda División B	37	9	2	0	6	1	45	10
Albacete Balompié	1983–84	Segunda División B	31	8	4	1	2	0	37	9
Albacete Balompié	1984–85	Segunda División B	37	8	4	2	6	0	47	10
Albacete Balompié	1985–86	Segunda División	26	0	2	1	2	0	30	1
Albacete Balompié	1986–87	Segunda División B	35	4	3	1	–	–	38	5
Albacete Balompié	1987–88	Segunda División B	32	5	4	1	–	–	36	6
Albacete Balompié	1988–89	Segunda División B	26	1	1	0	–	–	27	1
Albacete Balompié	1989–90	Segunda División B	7	2	0	0	–	–	7	2
Albacete Balompié	Total		301	57	26	7	16	1	343	65
Yeclano	1990–91	Segunda División B	10	1	1	0	–	–	11	1
Career total			341	63	37	7	16	1	394	71

1. Appearances in the 1983 Copa de la Liga Segunda División B
2. Appearances in the 1984 Copa de la Liga Segunda División B
3. Appearances in the 1985 Copa de la Liga Segunda División B
4. Appearances in the 1986 Copa de la Liga

=== As a manager ===
As of 27 December 2020

Managerial record by team and tenure
Team	Nat	From	To	Record							
Team	Nat	From	To	G	W	D	L	GF	GA	GD	Win %
Albacete Balompié	(Spain)	20 December 1992	20 December 1992	1	0	0	1	0	2	−2	0.00
