= Javier López Vallejo =

Spanish footballer

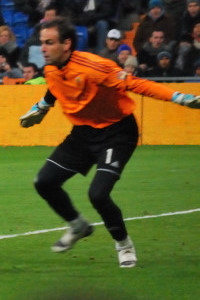
- López Vallejo with Zaragoza in 2009

Personal information
- Date of birth: 22 September 1975 (age 51)
- Place of birth: Pamplona, Spain
- Height: 1.86 m (6 ft 1 in)
- Position: Goalkeeper

Youth career
- Osasuna

Senior career*
Years	Team	Apps	(Gls)
1992–1995	Osasuna B	79	(0)
1994–1999	Osasuna	150	(0)
1999–2007	Villarreal	120	(0)
2006–2007	→ Recreativo (loan)	30	(0)
2007–2010	Zaragoza	38	(0)
2010	Levadiakos	10	(0)
2010–2011	Kavala	3	(0)
Total		430	(0)

International career
1990–1992	Spain U16	17	(0)
1991	Spain U17	6	(0)
1991–1994	Spain U18	21	(0)
1995	Spain U19	2	(0)
1995	Spain U20	5	(0)
1993–1998	Spain U21	4	(0)
1997	Spain U23	2	(0)
2003–2005	Navarre	3	(0)
2006	Basque Country	1	(0)
Medal record
Men's football
Representing Spain
FIFA World U-17
Runner-up	1991 Italy
UEFA Euro U-16
Winner	1991 Switzerland
- * Club domestic league appearances and goals

Javier López Vallejo (born 22 September 1975) is a Spanish former professional footballer who played as a goalkeeper.

== Club career ==
Born in Pamplona, López Vallejo began his career at hometown's CA Osasuna, making his first appearance for the main squad not yet 19 in a 3–0 home win over Sporting de Gijón on 15 May 1994, although the Navarrese had already been relegated from La Liga. He became an undisputed starter from the 1995–96 season onwards.

López Vallejo signed for Villarreal CF in 1999 alongside teammate Jesús Unanua (also a goalkeeper), appearing in all the games during the 1999–2000 campaign as the club returned to the top flight after a one-year absence. He retained first-choice status the following two years.

With the signing of Pepe Reina in 2002 and the subsequent arrival of imports Sebastián Viera and Mariano Barbosa, however, López Vallejo was consecutively demoted to backup and third-choice. In order to search more playing opportunities he joined Recreativo de Huelva in the same league on loan for the 2006–07 season, where he played the majority of the Andalusians' matches.

In 2007–08, López Vallejo signed for Real Zaragoza on a free transfer, where he backed up former Real Madrid player César (two games). As the latter moved to Tottenham Hotspur in August 2008 he became the starter, with the side now in the Segunda División, and was instrumental as they immediately returned to the top tier.

López Vallejo started the 2009–10 season on the bench, then became first-choice over Juan Pablo Carrizo. However, he lost his position in January 2010 with the arrival of new coach José Aurelio Gay and, later that month, was released by mutual consent; he immediately found a new team, joining Levadiakos F.C. in Greece alongside his compatriot Kike Sola, from former club Osasuna.

== International career ==
In 1991, López Vallejo helped the Spain under-17s to win the UEFA European Championship in Switzerland (then named under-16). Later that year, in the FIFA World Cup equivalent, he was the starter in a final runner-up position in Italy.

López Vallejo also won caps for the unofficial Navarre and Basque Country regional sides.

== Career statistics ==
Appearances and goals by club, season and competition
Club	Season	League			Cup		Europe		Total	
Club	Season	Division	Apps	Goals	Apps	Goals	Apps	Goals	Apps	Goals
Osasuna B	1992–93	Segunda División B	35	0	—		—		35	0
Osasuna B	1993–94	Segunda División B	12	0	—		—		12	0
Osasuna B	1994–95	Segunda División B	32	0	—		—		32	0
Osasuna B	Total		79	0	—		—		79	0
Osasuna	1993–94	La Liga	1	0	1	0	—		2	0
Osasuna	1994–95	Segunda División	2	0	2	0	—		4	0
Osasuna	1995–96	Segunda División	33	0	2	0	—		35	0
Osasuna	1996–97	Segunda División	33	0	5	0	—		38	0
Osasuna	1997–98	Segunda División	40	0	7	0	—		47	0
Osasuna	1998–99	Segunda División	41	0	0	0	—		41	0
Osasuna	Total		150	0	17	0	—		167	0
Villarreal	1999–2000	Segunda División	42	0	0	0	—		42	0
Villarreal	2000–01	La Liga	36	0	1	0	—		38	0
Villarreal	2001–02	La Liga	38	0	5	0	—		38	0
Villarreal	2002–03	La Liga	4	0	1	0	4	0	9	0
Villarreal	2003–04	La Liga	0	0	3	0	4	0	7	0
Villarreal	2004–05	La Liga	0	0	1	0	2	0	3	0
Villarreal	2005–06	La Liga	0	0	2	0	0	0	2	0
Villarreal	Total		120	0	13	0	10	0	143	0
Recreativo (loan)	2006–07	La Liga	30	0	0	0	—		30	0
Zaragoza	2007–08	La Liga	2	0	3	0	1	0	6	0
Zaragoza	2008–09	Segunda División	29	0	1	0	—		30	0
Zaragoza	2009–10	La Liga	7	0	1	0	—		8	0
Zaragoza	Total		38	0	5	0	1	0	44	0
Levadiakos	2010–11	Super League Greece	10	0	0	0	—		10	0
Kavala	2011–12	Super League Greece	3	0	0	0	—		3	0
Career total			430	0	35	0	11	0	476	0

== Honours ==
Villarreal

- UEFA Intertoto Cup: 2003, 2004

Spain U16

- UEFA European Under-16 Championship: 1991

Spain U17

- FIFA U-17 World Cup runner-up: 1991
