= Josep Maria Sala =

Spanish footballer (born 1963)

Personal information
- Full name: Josep Maria Sala Boix
- Date of birth: 24 April 1964 (age 62)
- Place of birth: Sant Hipòlit de Voltregà, Spain
- Height: 1.75 m (5 ft 9 in)
- Position: Midfielder

Youth career
- 1982: Sabadell

Senior career*
Years	Team	Apps	(Gls)
1982–1988	Sabadell	106	(5)
1988–1993	Real Mallorca	155	(2)
1993–1995	Albacete Balompié	61	(2)
1995–1998	Badajoz	105	(2)
1998–2000	Albacete Balompié	69	(2)
2000–2003	Sabadell	84	(15)
Total		580	(28)
- * Club domestic league appearances and goals

Josep Maria Sala Boix (born 27 November 1963 in Sant Hipòlit de Voltregà, Osona, Catalonia), also written José María Sala Boix, is a Spanish retired footballer who played as a midfielder. In a career spanning over two decades, he played 217 matches in La Liga with Sabadell, Real Mallorca and Albacete Balompié in the 1980s and 90s.

== Career ==
=== Sabadell ===
Sala began his career with local Catalan club Sabadell, joining their youth team in 1982. He graduated to the senior team the same year, and made his debut in the Copa del Rey on 29 September. This came in the home second leg of Sabadell's first round tie against Júpiter at Estadi de la Nova Creu Alta. Sala came on as a substitute as Sabadell won 4–0, securing a 5–0 aggregate victory. His first start, and first match in the Segunda División, was the 0–0 away draw with Linares on 24 October, and a week later he made his home league debut when coming on for Paquito with two minutes to play in a 1–0 win over Deportivo Alavés.

Sala had to wait until 6 January to make his first start at home, which came in a 1–1 draw with Rayo Vallecano. He ultimately made 16 appearances that season, but an 18th place finish meant that Sabadell were relegated to Segunda División B. In 1983–84, he played 24 matches, initially often as a substitute. In a home fixture against Barakaldo on 2 October, Sala came on in place of Joan Golobart and scored his first goal to round out a 5–0 victory for Sabadell.

He scored twice more that year, both coming very early in matches: a Copa del Rey second round match away at Andorra on 19 October, in which Sabadell progressed on penalties despite losing 2–1 on the day, and a 5–0 home league win over Huesca on 25 March. It was also a good year for the club, who topped their group and earned promotion straight back to the Segunda División. Sabadell spent another two seasons in the second tier, before finishing as runners-up in 1985–86 and earning promotion to La Liga for the first time since 1971–72.

Sala's top flight debut came in Sabadell's first match of the season, a 1–0 loss to Real Betis at Estadio Benito Villamarín on 31 August, and he also started their first home match, a 2–2 draw with Real Sociedad, a week later. He scored his first La Liga goal against Cádiz at Estadio Ramón de Carranza on 5 October, a goal which turned out to be a mere consolation as Sabadell lost 3–1. This was his only goal in 23 appearances that season. In 1987–88 he was a crucial part of Sabadell's team, playing 41 matches and scoring once more, in a fabulous 3–2 home win over Real Madrid in the first leg of their Copa del Rey quarter-final. Despite these heroics, Real ultimately progressed after a 2–0 extra time win in the second leg.

The success of Sabadell's cup run was not to be repeated in the league, and following a 2–0 loss to Athletic Bilbao at San Mamés on the final day of the season they found themselves in 19th place and were relegated. This turned out to be Sala's last match for the club, as he departed at the end of the season.

=== Real Mallorca ===
Sala signed for Real Mallorca in the summer of 1988; the islanders, like his former club, had just been relegated to the Segunda División. He was an immediate fixture in his new club's starting eleven, making his debut in the first match of the season, a 2–0 home win over Real Burgos at Lluís Sitjar Stadium on 4 September. He managed 40 appearances that year, and helped Mallorca to 4th place in the league, which earned them a promotion playoff spot.

Sala played in both legs of the playoff against Español as Mallorca overturned a 1–0 deficit from the first leg at Sarrià Stadium to win 2–1 on aggregate and earn an immediate return to La Liga. 1989–90 saw him maintain his key role in the side, as he played 36 matches in all competitions, but the following season was to be an even better one for both player and club. Sala made a huge 46 appearances, while Mallorca maintained their top flight status once again with a 15th place finish, and also reached the Copa del Rey final for the first time in their history.

However, Sala missed the final, held at Real Madrid's Santiago Bernabéu Stadium on 29 June, as Mallorca were defeated by Atlético Madrid thanks to an extra time goal from Alfredo. In 1991–92, Sala continued to play an important part, playing 32 matches. He also scored his first Mallorca goal, which came in a 7–0 home demolition of Binéfar in the third round of the Copa del Rey on 19 September.

He was forced to go in goal for the last ten minutes of the home fixture against Real Burgos on 10 May, after Bogdan Stelea was sent off with the scores at 1–1. Sala conceded the resulting penalty, from Stelea's Romania international teammate Gavril Balint, but otherwise kept a clean sheet for the rest of the game. A late goal from Esteve Fradera allowed Mallorca to salvage a 2–2 draw. Come the end of the season, Mallorca found themselves bottom of the table, and Sala suffered La Liga relegation for the second time in his career.

Back in the second tier the following year, Sala made 33 appearances and scored twice. It was a good season for Mallorca, who ended up fourth in the table and earned a promotion playoff place. Sala played in both legs of a closely fought tie against Albacete Balompié, but the Manchegans prevailed to retain their top flight status, and condemn Mallorca to another year in the Segunda División. These were Sala's last matches for Mallorca, as, keen to return to the top division, he left the club at the end of the season.

=== Albacete Balompié ===
Albacete, not content with beating Mallorca in the playoff, were also after their players. Sala, along with teammate Esteve Fradera, joined Albacete ahead of the 1993–94 season. Sala made his Albacete debut in the first match of the season, away at Athletic Bilbao on 5 September. He marked his debut at San Mamés with a goal from the penalty spot, which turned out to be a consolation prize as Albacete lost 4–1. His first home match at Estadio Carlos Belmonte followed six days later, and the result was more positive, as they drew 0–0 with the mighty Barcelona. In all, he played 38 times that season, and scored a second goal, also a penalty, in a 1–1 draw with Real Oviedo at Estadio Carlos Tartiere.

The following year, Sala made 34 appearances, but Albacete ended the season in 17th place, and therefore faced a relegation playoff. Sala played in both legs as Albacete lost 5–2 on aggregate to Salamance. This should've meant their relegation, but they earned a reprieve following the administration scandal involving Sevilla and Celta Vigo.

=== Badajoz ===
Despite Albacete's surprise survival, Sala did descend to the Segunda División, joining Badajoz in 1995. He was immediately a key part of the side, making his debut in the first match of the season, a 2–1 away loss against UE Lleida at Camp d'Esports on 3 September. His home debut came a week later in a 2–0 win over Atlético Marbella. He scored his first goal for the club on 22 October, netting a late penalty to earn Badajoz a 1–1 home draw with Logroñés. He ended up playing 36 matches that year, and scored a second goal in the 5–1 away victory over Barcelona B at Mini Estadi on 20 April.

In 1996–97, Sala made 31 appearances, but his third season with Badajoz would be his busiest. He played 44 times, but departed the club at the end of the season. His final match for Badajoz was a 2–0 home win over Ourense on 16 May 1998.

=== Return to Albacete ===
After three years at Badajoz, Sala returned to his previous employers, Albacete Balompié, ahead of the 1998–99 season. Albacete was by now in the Segunda División, following relegation in 1996, and Sala made 40 appearances and scored one goal in his first season back with the club. Albacete were facing difficulties both on and off the pitch, and could only manage 15th place in the league. The following season was similarly difficult, although it brought a slightly better return of 10th. Sala played 33 matches, and again scored a single goal, a penalty in a 2–1 win over Sporting de Gijón at El Molinón on 26 September. However, come the summer, Sala left the club, for good this time. His last Albacete match was a 1–0 home loss to Getafe on 4 June 2000.

=== Return to Sabadell ===
In the summer of 2000, Sala signed for another of his former clubs, rejoining Sabadell after twelve years away. Like Albacete, Sabadell had fallen on somewhat harder times since he last played for them, and were now in Segunda División B. In 2000–01, Sala made 42 appearances and got his career highest goal return, scoring six times. Sabadell ended the year third in the table, and earned themselves a place in the playoffs. Sala played in all six playoff matches, even scoring in the first against Burgos at Estadio El Plantío, but Sabadell placed third in the group, and it was Burgos that earned promotion.

Sala's appearances tailed off slightly over the next two years, although he remained an important part of the team. He played 29 matches in 2001–02, and 21 the following year, after which he finally retired. His final professional appearance was a nine-minute cameo in a 1–0 home loss against Burgos on 11 May 2003, coming on as a substitute for Manuel Cabezas. This brought down the curtain on a 21 year professional career in which Sala made over 650 appearances.

== Honours ==
Sabadell

- Segunda División B: 1983–84
- Segunda División runners-up: 1985–86 (earning promotion to La Liga)
- Copa del Rey quarter-finalists: 1985–86, 1987–88

Real Mallorca

- Segunda División fourth place: 1988–89 (earning promotion to La Liga)
- Copa del Rey runners-up: 1990–91
- Copa del Rey quarter-finalists: 1988–89

Albacete Balompié

- Copa del Rey semi-finalists: 1994–95

== Career statistics ==
As of 29 January 2021

Club	Season	League			Cup		Other		Total	
Club	Season	Division	Apps	Goals	Apps	Goals	Apps	Goals	Apps	Goals
Sabadell	1982–83	Segunda División	13	0	2	0	1	0	16	0
Sabadell	1983–84	Segunda División B	19	2	5	1	0	0	24	3
Sabadell	1985–86	Segunda División	18	2	4	0	0	0	22	2
Sabadell	1986–87	La Liga	20	1	3	0	–	–	23	1
Sabadell	1987–88	La Liga	36	0	5	1	–	–	41	1
Sabadell	Total		106	5	19	2	1	0	126	7
Real Mallorca	1988–89	Segunda División	32	0	6	0	2	0	40	0
Real Mallorca	1989–90	La Liga	34	0	2	0	–	–	36	0
Real Mallorca	1990–91	La Liga	36	0	10	0	–	–	46	0
Real Mallorca	1991–92	La Liga	30	0	2	1	–	–	32	1
Real Mallorca	1992–93	Segunda División	23	2	8	0	2	0	33	2
Real Mallorca	Total		155	2	28	1	4	0	187	3
Albacete Balompié	1993–94	La Liga	37	2	1	0	–	–	38	2
Albacete Balompié	1994–95	La Liga	24	0	8	1	2	0	34	1
Albacete Balompié	Total		61	2	9	1	2	0	72	3
Badajoz	1995–96	Segunda División	34	2	2	0	–	–	36	2
Badajoz	1996–97	Segunda División	30	0	1	0	–	–	31	0
Badajoz	1997–98	Segunda División	41	0	3	0	–	–	44	0
Badajoz	Total		105	2	6	0	0	0	111	2
Albacete Balompié	1998–99	Segunda División	37	1	3	0	–	–	40	1
Albacete Balompié	1999–2000	Segunda División	32	1	1	0	–	–	33	1
Albacete Balompié	Total		69	2	4	0	0	0	73	2
Albacete Balompié total			130	4	13	1	2	0	145	5
Sabadell	2000–01	Segunda División B	36	5	–	–	6	1	42	6
Sabadell	2001–02	Segunda División B	27	5	2	0	–	–	29	5
Sabadell	2002–03	Segunda División B	21	5	–	–	–	–	21	5
Sabadell	Total		84	15	2	0	6	1	92	16
Sabadell total			190	20	21	2	7	1	218	23
Career total			580	28	68	4	13	1	661	33

1. Appearance in the 1983 Copa de la Liga Segunda División
2. Appearances in the 1988–89 Segunda División promotion playoff
3. Appearances in the 1992–93 Segunda División promotion playoff
4. Appearances in the 1994–95 La Liga relegation playoff
5. Appearances in the 2001 Segunda División B playoffs
