= Esteve Fradera =

Spanish footballer

Personal information
- Full name: Esteve Fradera Serrat
- Date of birth: 7 May 1963 (age 63)
- Place of birth: Santa Coloma de Farners, Spain
- Height: 1.79 m (5 ft 10 in)
- Position: Defender

Youth career
- 1979–1981: Barcelona

Senior career*
Years	Team	Apps	(Gls)
1981–1982	Barcelona Amateur		
1982–1985	Barcelona Atlètic	82	(2)
1985–1987	Barcelona	17	(0)
1987–1989	Sabadell	64	(3)
1989–1993	Real Mallorca	142	(5)
1993–1995	Albacete Balompié	72	(1)
1995–1996	Real Mallorca	2	(0)
Total		379	(11)
- * Club domestic league appearances and goals as of 25 January 2021

Esteve Fradera Serrat (born 7 May 1963) is a Spanish former footballer who played as a defender and later worked as a coach.

He was a product of Barcelona's famous La Masia academy, and played a total of 225 matches in La Liga with Barcelona, Sabadell, Real Mallorca and Albacete Balompié.

== Playing career ==
=== Barcelona ===
Fradera was born in Santa Coloma de Farners, capital of the comarca of the Selva in Catalonia. He joined the youth teams of Catalan giants Barcelona in 1979, as one of the first cohort to attend the famous La Masia academy. There, he was a contemporary of players such as Ángel Pedraza, who was the first La Masia player to appear for the Barca first team. He played with Barcelona Amateur, the C team, in the 1981–82 Tercera División, before being promoted to the B team, Barcelona Atlètic, for the 1982–83 Segunda División season.

He made his Atlètic debut in a 5–0 home win over CF Igualada in the first round of the Copa del Rey on 15 September 1982, coming on for the last 20 minutes in place of Pere Gratacós. His full debut came in the second leg a fortnight later, where a 2–1 loss didn't stop Atlètic progressing on aggregate. His first home start followed in the next round on 3 November, in the second leg against CF Badalona, in which a 2–0 victory repeated the first leg score and sent Atlètic through once again.

Four days later, he made his league debut in a 2–2 away draw with Córdoba, and he kept his place for the 1–1 home draw with Cartagena FC a week after that. In all, he made 36 appearances that season, and scored his first goal for the club just after half time in the home second leg of their Copa de la Liga first round tie against Castellón on 2 June. Nine minutes later, he added a second to help Atlètic to a 2–0 win, although they could not overturn the 3–0 deficit from the first leg. In the first game of the following season, at home to Deportivo La Coruña, Fradera scored his first league goal, and once again added a second in the same game as the hosts ran out 3–1 winners. These would be his only goals in 29 appearances that season.

1984–85 brought 33 further appearances, but Fradera began 1985–86 still playing with the B team. However, a first team call-up was not far away, and it arrived with the home second leg of the 1985 Supercopa de España at Camp Nou on 30 October. Barca needed to overturn a 3–1 deficit from the first leg against Atlético Madrid, and were 1–0 up when Fradera came on for goalscorer José Ramón Alexanko at half time. However, there was no further change to the scoreline and Atleti won the cup.

His next appearance came on 6 November in the second leg of Barca's European Cup second round tie against Porto at Estádio das Antas. Barcelona travelled to Portugal with a 2–0 advantage from the first leg, but two goals from Juary had levelled things up by the time Fradera came on for Ramón Calderé with 15 minutes to play. A goal from Steve Archibald restored Barca's lead, and even though Juary completed his hattrick in the dying moments, Barcelona progressed thanks to the away goals rule.

Just three days after this European debut, Fradera made his La Liga debut, coming on in place of Víctor Muñoz for the last six minutes of El Clásico against Real Madrid, with Barca's 2–0 home victory already secure. His first start for the first team came on 5 February, as a 0–0 home draw with Lleida was enough to send Barca through to the Copa del Rey quarter-finals after a 1–0 win in the first leg.

On 1 March, Fradera made his first start in La Liga, in a 4–0 home win over Real Valladolid. In the first leg of Barcelona's European Cup semi-final against Göteborg on 2 April, their Swedish hosts were already 3–0 up by the time Fradera came on for Esteban Vigo with 26 minutes to play. However, a contracture ensured he didn't play as Barca famously recovered through a Pichi Alonso hattrick and a penalty shoot-out in the second leg to reach the final, and was also absent in Seville when more penalties denied the Catalans and gave the cup to Steaua București of Romania.

Barcelona enjoyed more success in the Copa de la Liga, and Fradera played a key part. Six of his 18 appearances that season were in the competition, and he played in both legs of the final against Real Betis as Barca overturned a 1–0 deficit from the match at Estadio Benito Villamarín to win the cup 2–1 on aggregate. 1986–87 was Fradera's first full season with the Barcelona first team, but he made only 14 appearances in all competitions, including what would turn out to be his last match for the club: a 2–1 defeat by Real Zaragoza at La Romareda on 17 May. He was named in Barca's 1987–88 UEFA Cup squad, but it was clear he would have to look elsewhere for regular playing time, and he departed before the end of the summer.

=== Sabadell ===
Fradera's destination in the summer of 1987 was Sabadell, who were embarking on the second top flight season of their current spell, having escaped relegation the previous season only on goal difference. His Sabadell debut came on 25 October, in a 2–0 away loss to Real Murcia at Estadio de La Condomina, and he kept his place for the home fixture against Real Sociedad at Estadi de la Nova Creu Alta a week later, which also ended in a 2–0 defeat.

These early defeats set the tone for Sabadell's season, as the finished 1987–88 in 19th place and were relegated. It was a good season for Fradera, though, who found the regular first team action he was looking for when he left Barcelona. He made 36 appearances, and netted his first La Liga goal in a 1–1 draw with Español at Sarrià Stadium on 8 May. Back in the Segunda División the following season, he continued to be a key part of the team, playing 38 matches.

However, when Fradera was offered the opportunity to return to the top division in the summer of 1989, it was inevitable he would take it. His last match for Sabadell was a 2–1 win over Racing Santander at El Sardinero, which he marked in style by scoring his third goal of the season.

=== Real Mallorca ===
Real Mallorca earned and immediate return to La Liga in 1989 after an extra time victory over Español in the Segunda División promotion playoff, and Fradera joined the club that summer. He made his debut in Mallorca's first match of the season, a 1–0 away loss to Osasuna at Estadio El Sadar on 3 September. A week later he made his first appearance at Mallorca's Lluís Sitjar Stadium, in a 1–1 draw with Real Oviedo. In the next match, against Castellón at Nou Estadi Castàlia on 17 September, he scored his first Mallorca goal, which proved to be crucial as the ran out 2–1 winners.

He made 36 appearances in all competitions that season, scoring twice, and 1990–91 was even busier. Fradera racked up a massive 47 matches as Mallorca once again avoided relegation, and also reached the final of the Copa del Rey for the first time in their history. Fradera started in the final, which was held on 29 June at Real Madrid's Santiago Bernabéu Stadium. Mallorca took on six-time winners Atlético Madrid, and held the Madrilenian side at 0–0 for 90 minutes. After more than 20 minutes of extra time, Alfredo finally broke the deadlock, giving Atleti the cup.

In the following season, Fradera made 40 appearances and scored a career high four goals. However, just a year after the highs of the cup final, Mallorca suffered a very different experience as they finished bottom of the league and were relegated back to the Segunda División. He was heavily involved in the resulting second tier campaign in 1992–93, playing 43 matches and helping Mallorca to fourth place in the league. This earned them a promotion playoff against Albacete Balompié, and Fradera played in both legs. However, a 2–1 win at Estadio Carlos Belmonte in the second leg wasn't enough to overturn the 3–1 deficit from the first leg, and the Manchegans maintained their La Liga place while condemning Mallorca to another year in the second tier.

=== Albacete Balompié ===
The playoff result acted as a catalyst in Fradera's career. Desperate to return to La Liga action, he joined the very team that had denied Mallorca's promotion. He signed for Albacete Balompié ahead of the 1993–94 season, leaving Mallorca having missed just ten league games in four years. He made his Albacete debut in the first match of the season, a 4–1 away loss to Athletic Bilbao at San Mamés on 5 September, and his home debut followed six days later in a fine 0–0 draw with his old club, Barcelona, at Estadio Carlos Belmonte. He was almost ever-present in his first season, making 39 appearances in all competitions.

The following season brought 44 appearances, including being a key part in Albacete's run to the Copa del Rey semi-finals. Fradera also scored his only Albacete goal, in a 1–1 draw with Logroñés at Estadio Las Gaunas on 24 September. However, Albacete ended the season 17th, and so faced a relegation playoff against Salamanca. Fradera played in both legs as, despite a 2–0 win at Helmántico Stadium in the first leg, Albacete were overwhelmed 5–2 on aggregate. Albacete were later handed a reprieve thanks to the administration scandal involving Sevilla and Celta Vigo, but Fradera was placed on the transfer list by manager Benito Floro.

=== Return to Mallorca ===
Fradera returned to Real Mallorca, after two years away, as they prepared for the 1995–96 Segunda División campaign. He struggled to break back into the team, and his only appearances early in the season were in the Copa del Rey first round tie against Manlleu, which Mallorca won 3–1 on aggregate. He managed just two appearances in the league - a 3–1 win over Villarreal at Estadio El Madrigal on 15 October, and a 2–1 home loss to Extremadura on 19 November - before suffering a serious Achilles tendon injury. He underwent an operation at the end of November, with famous orthopedic surgeon Ramon Cugat, and was initially expected to be out for several months.

The severity of the injury led to Mallorca deregistering him in December, although by the following July a possible return was still being discussed. It was not to be, however, and in October 1996, after almost a year on the sidelines, Fradera retired at the age of 33.

== Coaching career ==
In retirement, Fradera became a youth coach with Vilobí CF, not far from his birthplace of Santa Coloma de Farners.

== Honours ==
Barcelona

- Copa de la Liga: 1986
- Supercopa de España runners-up: 1985
- European Cup runners-up: 1985–86

Real Mallorca

- Copa del Rey runners-up: 1990–91

== Career statistics ==
As of 20 January 2021

Club	Season	League			Cup		Europe		Other		Total	
Club	Season	Division	Apps	Goals	Apps	Goals	Apps	Goals	Apps	Goals	Apps	Goals
Barcelona Amateur	1981–82	Tercera División	?	?	6	0	–	–	–	–	6	0
Barcelona Atlètic	1982–83	Segunda División	28	0	6	0	–	–	2	2	36	2
Barcelona Atlètic	1983–84	Segunda División	23	2	6	0	–	–	0	0	29	2
Barcelona Atlètic	1984–85	Segunda División	30	0	3	0	–	–	0	0	33	0
Barcelona Atlètic	1985–86	Segunda División	1	0	0	0	–	–	0	0	1	0
Barcelona Atlètic	Total		82	2	15	0	0	0	2	2	99	4
Barcelona	1985–86	La Liga	6	0	1	0	3	0	7	0	17	0
Barcelona	1986–87	La Liga	11	0	2	0	1	0	–	–	14	0
Barcelona	1987–88	La Liga	0	0	0	0	0	0	–	–	0	0
Barcelona	Total		17	0	3	0	4	0	7	0	31	0
Sabadell	1987–88	La Liga	30	1	6	0	–	–	–	–	36	1
Sabadell	1988–89	Segunda División	34	2	4	1	–	–	–	–	38	3
Sabadell	Total		64	3	10	1	0	0	0	0	74	4
Real Mallorca	1989–90	La Liga	35	2	2	0	–	–	–	–	37	2
Real Mallorca	1990–91	La Liga	35	0	12	0	–	–	–	–	47	0
Real Mallorca	1991–92	La Liga	36	3	4	1	–	–	–	–	40	4
Real Mallorca	1992–93	Segunda División	36	0	5	0	–	–	2	0	43	0
Real Mallorca	Total		142	5	23	1	0	0	2	0	167	6
Albacete Balompié	1993–94	La Liga	37	0	2	0	–	–	–	–	39	0
Albacete Balompié	1994–95	La Liga	35	1	7	0	–	–	2	0	44	1
Albacete Balompié	Total		72	1	9	0	0	0	2	0	83	1
Real Mallorca	1995–96	Segunda División	2	0	2	0	–	–	–	–	4	0
Real Mallorca total			144	5	25	1	0	0	2	0	171	6
Career total			379	11	68	2	4	0	13	2	464	15

1. Appearances in the 1983 Copa de la Liga Segunda División B
2. Appearances in the 1985–86 European Cup
3. 1 appearance in the 1985 Supercopa de España and 6 appearances in the 1986 Copa de la Liga
4. Appearance in the 1986–87 UEFA Cup
5. Appearances in the 1992–93 Segunda División promotion playoff
6. Appearances in the 1994–95 La Liga relegation playoff
