= Catali (footballer) =

Spanish footballer

Personal information
- Full name: Francisco Javier Mármol Rodríguez
- Date of birth: 21 July 1961 (age 65)
- Place of birth: Albacete, Spain
- Height: 1.75 m (5 ft 9 in)
- Position: Midfielder

Youth career
- –1983: Albacete Balompié
- → Hellín Deportivo (loan)
- → Villarrobledo (loan)

Senior career*
Years	Team	Apps	(Gls)
1983–1993	Albacete Balompié	286	(28)
1993–1994	Toledo	25	(0)
1994–2002	Quintanar del Rey		
Total		311	(28)
- * Club domestic league appearances and goals

Francisco Javier Mármol Rodríguez (born 21 July 1961), known as Catali, is a Spanish former footballer who played as a midfielder. His career is most closely associated with Albacete Balompié, with whom he played for 10 seasons, and made 53 appearances in La Liga in the early 1990s.

== Career ==
=== Albacete Balompié ===
Catali was born in Albacete in the autonomous community of Castilla–La Mancha, and was brought up in the youth teams of local club Albacete Balompié, including spells at nearby clubs Hellín Deportivo and Villarrobledo. He was promoted to the first team during the 1983–84 season, and made his debut on New Year's Day 1984 in a 1–1 home draw with Antequerano at Estadio Carlos Belmonte. He replaced José Antonio Álvarez for the last ten minutes of the game.

He played only once more that season, also as a substitute, but the following season was to be a great one for both player and club. He made his first start in the first match of the season, a 1–0 win over Rayo Vallecano at Vallecas on 2 September, and also started at home to Linares three weeks later in another 1–0 victory. He scored his first goal on 10 October as Albacete drew 1–1 at home with Cartagena FC in the first round of the Copa del Rey to secure a 4–1 aggregate victory. He scored twice more in his 47 appearances that year, both in the Copa de la Liga, a competition which Albacete won by beating Badajoz 3–1 on aggregate in the final.

Even better for Albacete, they ended the year as runners-up in their Segunda División B group, earning promotion to the second tier.

== Personal life ==
After retirement, Catali ran a cafeteria in Poligono Campollano in Albacete.

== Honours ==
Albacete Balompie

- Segunda División B runners-up: 1984–85 (earning promotion to Segunda División)
- Segunda División B: 1989–90
- Segunda División: 1990–91 Segunda División
- Copa de la Liga Segunda División B: 1985

Quintanar del Rey

- Segunda División Autonómica de Castilla-La Mancha: 1996–97
- Primera División Autonómica de Castilla-La Mancha runners-up: 1998–99 (earning promotion to Tercera División)
- Tercera División: 2000–01

== Career statistics ==
As of 5 February 2021

Club	Season	League			Cup		Other		Total	
Club	Season	Division	Apps	Goals	Apps	Goals	Apps	Goals	Apps	Goals
Cartagena FC	1983–84	Segunda División B	2	0	0	0	0	0	2	0
Cartagena FC	1984–85	Segunda División B	37	0	4	1	6	2	47	3
Cartagena FC	1985–86	Segunda División	32	0	1	0	0	0	33	0
Cartagena FC	1986–87	Segunda División B	23	4	2	1	–		25	5
Cartagena FC	1987–88	Segunda División B	32	7	3	0	–		35	7
Cartagena FC	1988–89	Segunda División B	34	6	2	0	–		36	6
Cartagena FC	1989–90	Segunda División B	36	5	–		–		36	5
Cartagena FC	1990–91	Segunda División	37	1	0	0	–		37	1
Cartagena FC	1991–92	La Liga	37	4	1	0	–		38	4
Cartagena FC	1992–93	La Liga	16	1	2	0	2	0	20	1
Cartagena FC	Total		286	28	15	2	8	2	309	32
Toledo	1993–94	Segunda División	25	0	4	0	1	0	30	0
Quintanar del Rey	2001–02	Tercera División	?	?	2	0	–		2	0
Career total			311	28	21	2	9	2	341	32

1. Appearances in the 1985 Copa de la Liga Segunda División B
2. Appearances in the 1992–93 La Liga relegation playoff
3. Appearances in the 1993–94 Segunda División promotion playoff
