= Samartín de Podes =

- Parish
- Location within Spain
- Coordinates: 43.616667°N 5.883333°W
- Country: Spain
- Autonomous community: Asturias
- Province: Asturias
- Municipality: Gozón

Samartín de Podes is one of thirteen parishes (administrative divisions) in the Gozón municipality, within the province and autonomous community of Asturias, in northern Spain.

== Population entities ==
- El Campo
- La Xenra
- La Granda
- Lloreda
- Montoril

=== Other minor locations ===
- Armayor
- Carbayal
- Cirvión
- El Caleyón
- El Carbeyu
- El Cellero
- El Puirtu
- El Regarín
- El Teleférico
- Fresno
- Güía
- L'Otero
- La Cai
- La Campa
- La Corona
- La Cuesta
- La Furcada
- La Guarida
- La Pasada
- La Raba
- La Reguera
- La Torre
- La Varota
- Los Valles
- Valpire
- Xagón
