= Antonio López (footballer, born 1965) =

Spanish footballer

Personal information
- Full name: Antonio López Alfaro
- Date of birth: 20 May 1965 (age 61)
- Place of birth: Iniesta, Spain
- Height: 1.80 m (5 ft 11 in)
- Position: Centre forward

Senior career*
Years	Team	Apps	(Gls)
1982–1995	Albacete Balompié	299	(84)
1995–1997	Extremadura	43	(6)
Total		342	(90)
- * Club domestic league appearances and goals

Antonio López Alfaro (born 20 May 1965 in Iniesta, Cuenca, Castile-La Mancha) is a Spanish former professional footballer who played as a centre forward.

He spent thirteen season with Albacete Balompié, becoming their all-time top scorer, and being a key part of the legendary side which achieved consecutive promotions to reach La Liga for the first time in the club's history in 1991. He played 108 matches in the top flight for Albacete, before joining Extremadura, where he added 11 appearances in one further La Liga season.

== Career ==
=== Albacete Balompié ===
López began his career with Albacete Balompié, in his home region of Castile-La Mancha. He made his debut for the club, then in Segunda División B, on 20 February 1983, in a 2–1 home win over Fuengirola at Estadio Carlos Belmonte, one of three matches he played in the second half of 1982–83. The following season he played just once, in a 1–0 home loss to Parla on 5 February, but 1984–85 was a great season for both player and club.

López made 17 appearances in all competitions, and scored his first professional goal, one of three that season, in a 2–2 home draw with Alcoyano 23 December. He also played in both legs of the 3–1 aggregate victory over Badajoz in the Copa de la Liga Segunda División B final, coming on as a substitute for Julio Cabello in the first leg and Juan Lisón in the second.

Even better for the club, they finished as runners-up in their Segunda División B group, and were promoted to the Segunda División, beating Algeciras and Linense on goal difference. This paved the way for López to make his second tier debut, which he did in a 1–1 home draw with Cartagena FC 27 October. He wasn't used as frequently that season, but did manage to score twice in his 13 matches: in a 3–2 home victory over Atlético Madrileño on 13 April, and a 4–3 home win against Real Valladolid in the Copa de la Liga on 8 May.

At the end of the season, Albacete found themselves 17th in the table, and were relegated straight back to Segunda División B. Back in the third tier, López's career really came alive. He made at more than 30 appearances in each of the next three seasons, and scored in double figures each year. In 1989–90 he played 29 matches, but managed a career-high 18 goals. It was a great season for the club, too, who topped their group and were promoted back to the Segunda División. Even better was to follow. The ensuing second tier campaign saw López score 10 goals in 36 appearances, while Albacete won the title at the first attempt, and earned promotion to La Liga for the first time in their history.

López made his top flight debut on 10 November, in a 2–1 defeat at the hands of Real Madrid at Santiago Bernabéu Stadium. He scored his first goal at that level just after half time in a home fixture against Español on 22 December, and followed it up with a second 12 minutes later as Albacete won 3–2. He ultimately scored five times in 25 matches that season. 1992–93 was his best in La Liga on a personal level, as he scored 13 goals in 38 appearances, including a hattrick in 5–1 win at home to Utebo in the third round of the Copa del Rey. However, it was a difficult one for the team, which finished the season in 17th place, and therefore faced a relegation playoff. López scored a goal in each leg as Albacete beat Real Mallorca 4–3 on aggregate to retain their top flight status for another year.

Over the next two seasons, López was increasingly used as a substitute, and his goal scoring figures declined accordingly: he scored only once during 1993–94, and three times the following year. In the latter season, Albacete again placed 17th in the league, and again faced a relegation playoff, this time against Salamanca. López came on in place of Cordero in the first leg at Helmántico Stadium, and Albacete put themselves in a good position with a 2–0 win. However, they suffered the reverse scoreline in the home leg, and López came on for Nenad Bjelica as the game headed to extra time. With the sending off of Manolo Salvador, Albacete slumped to a humiliating 5–0 defeat.

This would normally have meant relegation for Albacete, but they were reprieved following an administration scandal involving Sevilla and Celta Vigo. However, the playoffs would prove to be López's last games for the club, as he departed after 327 appearances across 13 seasons. His total of 94 goals means he remains Albacete's all-time top scorer.

=== Extremadura ===
López joined Extremadura in the Segunda División ahead of the 1995–96 season. He made his debut in the first match of the season, playing the last half hour of a 1–0 away win over Sestao Sport. He made his first start five days later, in a 2–0 home win over Badajoz in the first round of the Copa del Rey at Estadio Francisco de la Hera, and marked the occasion with a goal. He also started in the 0–0 home draw with Toledo in the league on 10 September, and grabbed his first league goal on 8 October as Extremadura secured a 3–2 home win over Logroñés. He scored seven goals in his 36 matches that season, playing a key role as Extremadura qualified for the promotion playoff.

There, they met López's previous club, Albacete. López played in the home first leg, which Extremadura won 1–0, but missed the second, which ended in the same score line. Extremadura were promoted to La Liga for the first time in their history, relegating Antonio's former employers in the process. He wasn't used as heavily in the top flight campaign that followed, although he added two more goals in 13 appearances. The season ended with Extremadura being relegated in 19th place, and Antonio retired at the age of 32.

López's final match was a nine-minute cameo in Extremadura's last match of the season, a 1–0 loss to Deportivo La Coruña at Estadio Riazor on 22 June 1997, in which he came on for Carlos Duré. He ended his career with 119 appearances and 18 goals in the top division, both of which remain a record for a player from the Province of Cuenca.

== After retirement ==
López returned to Albacete in his retirement, acting as their sporting director from 2002 to 2007. On 26 August 2016, his home town of Iniesta inaugurated their new football field, which was named in his honour. He returned to Albacete once again on 19 March 2018, being appointed as a club ambassador alongside Juan Ignacio Rodríguez.

== Honours ==
Albacete Balompié

- Segunda División B runners-up: 1984–85 (earning promotion to Segunda División)
- Segunda División B: 1989–90
- Segunda División: 1990–91
- Copa de la Liga Segunda División B: 1983, 1985

Extremadura

- Segunda División promotion to La Liga: 1995–96

== Career statistics ==
As of 5 February 2021

Club	Season	League			Cup		Other		Total	
Club	Season	Division	Apps	Goals	Apps	Goals	Apps	Goals	Apps	Goals
Albacete Balompié	1982–83	Segunda División B	3	0	0	0	0	0	3	0
Albacete Balompié	1983–84	Segunda División B	1	0	0	0	0	0	1	0
Albacete Balompié	1984–85	Segunda División B	15	3	0	0	2	0	17	3
Albacete Balompié	1985–86	Segunda División	9	1	2	0	2	1	13	2
Albacete Balompié	1986–87	Segunda División B	34	11	2	1	–		36	12
Albacete Balompié	1987–88	Segunda División B	34	10	2	1	–		36	11
Albacete Balompié	1988–89	Segunda División B	32	16	1	0	–		33	16
Albacete Balompié	1989–90	Segunda División B	29	18	–		–		29	18
Albacete Balompié	1990–91	Segunda División	34	9	2	1	–		36	10
Albacete Balompié	1991–92	La Liga	25	5	0	0	–		25	5
Albacete Balompié	1992–93	La Liga	31	8	5	3	2	2	38	13
Albacete Balompié	1993–94	La Liga	29	1	0	0	–		29	1
Albacete Balompié	1994–95	La Liga	23	2	6	1	2	0	31	3
Albacete Balompié	Total		299	84	20	7	8	3	327	94
Extremadura	1995–96	Segunda División	32	4	3	3	1	0	36	7
Extremadura	1996–97	La Liga	11	2	2	0	–		13	2
Extremadura	Total		43	6	5	3	1	0	49	9
Career total			342	90	25	10	9	3	376	103

1. Appearances in the 1985 Copa de la Liga Segunda División B
2. Appearances in the 1986 Copa de la Liga
3. Appearances in the 1992–93 La Liga relegation playoff
4. Appearances in the 1994–95 La Liga relegation playoff
5. Appearance in the 1995–96 Segunda División promotion playoff
