= Albert Tomàs =

Spanish footballer

Albert Tomas
Personal information
- Full name: Albert Tomàs Sobrepera
- Date of birth: December 19, 1970 (age 55)
- Place of birth: Barcelona, Spain
- Height: 1.80 m (5 ft 11 in)
- Position: Defender

Senior career*
Years	Team	Apps	(Gls)
1988–1989	Barcelona C	7	(0)
1990–1993	Barcelona B	70	(1)
1993–1994	UE Lleida	22	(0)
1994–1997	Albacete	40	(0)
1997–1999	CD Toledo	45	(3)
1998	→ Vissel Kobe (loan)	17	(1)
1999–2001	Levante	61	(7)
2001–2002	Gimnàstic de Tarragona	23	(1)
2002–2004	Sabadell	18	(1)
- * Club domestic league appearances and goals

Albert Tomàs Sobrepera (born December 19, 1970) is a Spanish former football player.

== Club statistics ==
Club performance			League		Cup		League Cup		Total	
Season	Club	League	Apps	Goals	Apps	Goals	Apps	Goals	Apps	Goals
Japan			League		Emperor's Cup		J.League Cup		Total	
1998	Vissel Kobe	J1 League	17	1	2	0	3	1	22	2
Total			17	1	2	0	3	1	22	2
