= Alejandro Rodríguez (footballer, born 1964) =

Spanish footballer

Alejandro Rodríguez López (born 17 June 1964) is a retired Spanish footballer who played as a right-back.

== Football career ==
Born in Albacete, Castile-La Mancha, he began his career at hometown club Albacete Balompié. He made his debut on the opening day of the 1985–86 Segunda División season on 1 September, playing the entirety of a goalless draw with CD Logroñés, and played nine more games as the campaign ended with relegation.

In 1988, he joined CD Castellón also of the second tier, and played 32 games as they won the division, scoring to conclude a 5–1 win at UD Alzira on 4 June 1989. After playing the 1989–90 season in La Liga for the Valencians, he transferred to another top-flight team, Real Burgos CF, playing regularly over three campaigns.

After Burgos' relegation in 1993, Alejandro returned to Albacete, now also in the highest division. He played the next two seasons for them, scoring on 9 January 1994 as they came from behind to earn a 2–2 draw at home to Sevilla FC. He retired in 1996, after being used sparingly in a season at Gimnàstic de Tarragona in Segunda División B.
