= Sotero López =

Spanish association football player

Personal information
- Full name: Sotero López Clemente
- Date of birth: 12 August 1972 (age 54)
- Place of birth: Albacete, Spain
- Height: 1.81 m (5 ft 11 in)
- Positions: Left back; centre back

Senior career*
Years	Team	Apps	(Gls)
1990–1996	Albacete Balompié	83	(0)
1991	→ Ibiza (loan)		
1996–1998	Logroñés	23	(0)
1999–2001	Yeclano		
2001–2002	Algeciras CF	24	(0)
2002–2004	Palamós	51	(1)
2004–2005	Mérida UD		
2005–2006	Puertollano		
2006–2007	Motril		
2007–2008	Quintanar del Rey		
Total		181	(1)

International career
1993	Spain U21	1	(0)
- * Club domestic league appearances and goals

Sotero López Clemente (born 12 August 1972) is a Spanish former footballer who could play as a left back or centre back.

He began his career with Albacete Balompié, and played 104 La Liga matches for that club and Logroñés during the 1990s. He made one appearance in the Spain Under-21 national side in 1993.

== Club career ==
=== Albacete Balompié ===
Sotero was born in Albacete in the autonomous community of Castilla–La Mancha, and began his career with local club Albacete Balompié. He made his debut in the third round of the 1990–91 Copa del Rey, in a 3–3 away draw with Águilas on 8 November, which was his only appearance of that season. He wasn't involved as Albacete won the Segunda División, and earned promotion to La Liga for the first time in their history. He spent the first part of the following season on loan at Ibiza, who ultimately won their group in that year's Tercera División. His spell at Ibiza included a stunning 11–0 home win over Cala d'Or in the first round of the Copa del Rey on 25 August.

On his return to Albacete, he made his La Liga debut in a 3–1 away loss to Real Burgos at Estadio El Plantío on 26 April. He kept his place for his home debut a week later, in a 1–0 win over Real Mallorca at Estadio Carlos Belmonte. He ultimately played six matches for Albacete that season. He continued to be used as a fringe player over the next two seasons, making 18 appearances in all competitions in 1992–93, as Albacete escaped relegation thanks only to a playoff victory over Real Mallorca, and just seven the following year.

1994–95 would be Sotero's best season for the club. He played 46 matches in all competitions in what was a rather mixed year for Albacete. They reached the semi-finals of the Copa del Rey before eventually losing to Valencia, but 17th in the league meant they once again faced a relegation playoff. Sotero played in both legs of the 5–2 aggregate defeat by Salamanca, although an administration scandal involving Sevilla and Celta Vigo ultimately earned them a reprieve from relegation.

He was used somewhat more sparingly the following season, making 23 appearances. In Albacete's last league match of the year, against Atlético Madrid at Vicente Calderón Stadium, Sotero was sent off with eight minutes to play, and Albacete lost 2–0. The loss meant that they faced yet another relegation playoff, but the red card meant Sotero would miss it. Albacete lost 1–0 in both legs, and with no repeat of the previous year's reprieve were relegated. Sotero left the club at the end of the season after 101 matches in six years, meaning his Atlético sending off was his last act for the club.

=== Logroñés ===
Seeking to remain in La Liga, Sotero joined newly-promoted Logroñés ahead of the 1996–97 season. He made his debut in a 2–1 away win over Compostela at Estadio Multiusos de San Lázaro on 15 September, and made his home debut at Estadio Las Gaunas six days later in a 3–0 defeat by Atlético Madrid. He made 23 appearances in all competitions that year, but Logroñés finished bottom of the table in 22nd place, a massive twelve points from safety, and Sotero suffered a second consecutive relegation as the club returned to the Segunda División after a single year in the top fight.

Sotero fell dramatically out of favour the following year, playing just three times in all competitions, and not at all after a 5–0 defeat by Elche at Estadio Manuel Martínez Valero on 20 September. This proved to be his last appearance for the club.

=== Yeclano and Algeciras CF ===
After leaving Logroñés, Sotero joined Yeclano, before signing for Algeciras CF in 2001. His debut for the Segunda División B club came on the opening day of the season in a 1–0 home loss against Ceuta at Estadio Nuevo Mirador on 2 September, and he made a total of 24 appearances in what turned out to be his only season with the club. Once again, he marked his final match for the club, a 2–1 home win over Real Betis B on 7 April, with a red card; his third of the season.

=== Palamós ===
Sotero joined another Segunda División B club, Palamós, for the 2002–03 season. His debut for the Catalonian side, newly promoted from the Tercera División, came in the first match of the season, a 1–1 home draw with L'Hospitalet at Nou Estadi de Palamós on 1 September. He played 30 matches that year, and even scored an exceptionally rare goal, in a 2–2 draw with Castellón at Nou Estadi Castàlia on 6 December. The following season brought 24 appearances, but following a 4–0 defeat by Hércules at Estadio José Rico Pérez on the final day of the season, Palamós found themselves bottom of the table, and were relegated back to the Tercera División. Sotero left the club that summer.

=== Later career ===
After leaving Palamós, Sotero played one season each with Mérida UD and Puertollano, winning Tercera División group titles with both clubs. He was also part of the Puertollano team that won the 2005–06 Copa Federación de España. He saw out his career with a season apiece at Motril and Quintanar del Rey, before retiring in 2008.

== International career ==
Sotero played in the Spain Under-21 national team in a 2–0 friendly win over Greece at Estadio Colombino in Huelva on 23 February 1993. This was his only appearance for the Under-21s, and he was never called up to the Spain senior side.

== Honours ==
Albacete Balompié

- Segunda División: 1990–91

Ibiza

- Tercera División: 1991–92

Mérida UD

- Tercera División: 2004–05

Puertollano

- Tercera División: 2005–06
- Copa Federación de España: 2005–06

== Career statistics ==
=== Club ===
As of 25 January 2021

Club	Season	League			Cup		Other		Total	
Club	Season	Division	Apps	Goals	Apps	Goals	Apps	Goals	Apps	Goals
Albacete Balompié	1990–91	Segunda División	0	0	1	0	–	–	1	0
Albacete Balompié	1991–92	La Liga	6	0	0	0	–	–	6	0
Albacete Balompié	1992–93	La Liga	15	0	3	0	0	0	18	0
Albacete Balompié	1993–94	La Liga	5	0	2	0	–	–	7	0
Albacete Balompié	1994–95	La Liga	36	0	8	0	2	0	46	0
Albacete Balompié	1995–96	La Liga	21	0	2	0	0	0	23	0
Albacete Balompié	Total		83	0	16	0	2	0	101	0
Ibiza	1991–92	Tercera División	?	?	5	0	–	–	5	0
Logroñés	1996–97	La Liga	21	0	2	0	–	–	23	0
Logroñés	1997–98	Segunda División	2	0	1	0	–	–	3	0
Logroñés	Total		23	0	3	0	0	0	26	0
Algeciras CF	2001–02	Segunda División B	24	0	–	–	–	–	24	0
Palamós	2002–03	Segunda División B	27	1	3	0	–	–	30	1
Palamós	2003–04	Segunda División B	24	0	–	–	–	–	24	0
Palamós	Total		51	1	3	0	0	0	54	1
Career total			181	1	27	0	2	0	210	1

1. Appearances in the 1994–95 La Liga relegation play-offs

=== International ===
Appearances and goals by national team and year
National team	Year	Apps	Goals
Spain Under-21	1993	1	0
