= Fernando Marcos =

Spanish footballer

Personal information
- Full name: Fernando Marcos Santiago
- Date of birth: 4 December 1968 (age 57)
- Place of birth: Felanitx, Spain
- Height: 1.79 m (5 ft 10 in)
- Position: Goalkeeper

Youth career
- Oberena

Senior career*
| Years | Team | Apps | (Gls) |
| 1988–1990 | Real Mallorca | 2 | (0) |
| 1989–1990 | → Mallorca Atlético (loan) | 26 | (0) |
| 1990–1991 | Orihuela Deportiva | 17 | (0) |
| 1991–1996 | Albacete Balompié | 35 | (0) |
| 1993–1994 | → Cartagena FC (loan) | 30 | (0) |
| 1996–1999 | Racing Santander | 12 | (0) |
| 1999–2000 | Motril | 18 | (0) |
| 2000–2004 | Polideportivo Ejido | 46 | (0) |
| Total | | 186 | (0) |
- * Club domestic league appearances and goals

Fernando Marcos Santiago (born 4 December 1968) is a Spanish former footballer who played as a goalkeeper.

He played professionally in all of Spain's top three divisions, which included 47 appearances in La Liga with Albacete Balompié and Racing Santander.

== Career ==
=== Real Mallorca ===
Marcos was born in Felanitx, in the southeast of Majorca in the Spanish autonomous community of the Balearic Islands. He began his career with local side Real Mallorca, making his debut on 19 February 1989 in a Segunda División match away at Figueres. First choice goalkeeper Molondro was injured after half an hour, and Marcos was brought on to finish the game, conceding twice as Figueres won the game 2–1.

With Molondro still out of action, Marcos made his first start in the Copa del Rey round of 16 second leg match at home to Recreativo de Huelva three days later. With everything to play for following the 0–0 first leg, Marcos kept a clean sheet for the full 120 minutes at Lluís Sitjar Stadium, including 30 minutes extra time, to send the tie to penalties. Marcos won the shootout, saving a penalty from Melenas to send Mallorca into the quarterfinals. His final appearance as Molondro's deputy came in the next league match, at home to Salamanca, which Mallorca won 2–1.

Mallorca were promoted that season to La Liga via a playoff with Español. Marcos's three appearances that year proved to be his only first team action with Mallorca, and for 1989–90 he was sent to the farm team Mallorca Atlético in Segunda División B. He was instantly first choice, making his debut on 3 September in the opening match of the season at home to Manlleu, which the visitors won 2–1. He started 26 consecutive league matches, but following a 1–0 home win over Gimnàstic de Tarragona on 4 March he was dropped in favour of Molondro, and didn't play for the club again. He left Mallorca altogether at the end of the season.

=== Orihuela Deportiva ===
While Mallorca Atlético finished the 1989–90 season in 14th, only four points clear of relegation, their rivals Orihuela Deportiva topped the group and were promoted to the Segunda División. The Valencian club would be Marcos's next destination, as he joined in the summer of 1990. He wasn't immediately first choice for his new club, with Juan Espín preferred at the start of the season, but made his debut on 7 October in an away match against Elche at Estadio Manuel Martínez Valero. He kept a clean sheet as Orihuela won 1–0, and kept his place for the next match, at home to Rayo Vallecano a week later. This match, at Estadio Municipal Los Arcos, was somewhat less successful, with the visitors triumphing 4–2.

He ultimately made 17 appearances that season, with a 3–2 home win over Xerez on 26 May being the last. Orihuela's first season in the Segunda División for over 35 years was very successful, as they placed 5th and only missed out on the promotion playoff by three points. However, they were found to have failed to pay their players, and were punished with administrative relegation to Segunda División B. Marcos left at the end of the season.

=== Albacete Balompié ===
Following Orihuela's relegation, Marcos joined their erstwhile Segunda División rivals Albacete Balompié. Albacete had had a very successful season in 1990–91, topping the table and being promoted to La Liga for the first time in their history. However, Marcos would face a long wait to make his top flight debut. Experienced Costa Rican Luis Conejo was first choice in 1991–92, with Juan Carlos Balaguer also ahead of Marcos in the pecking order. The following season, Balaguer became the number one, with Jesús Unanua brought in on loan from Osasuna to act as his understudy. The result was that Marcos didn't make a single appearance during his first two years at Albacete.

For the 1993–94 season, Marcos was sent out on loan to Cartagena FC in Segunda División B. He made his first competitive appearance in over two years as he started both legs of Cartagena's Copa del Rey first round tie against Mar Menor. They won the first leg, away from home, 1–0, but suffered a humiliating 2–0 defeat in the return fixture at Estadio Cartagonova, and were eliminated by their Tercera División opponents. Marcos also started the first two league matches of the year, away at Gramenet and at home to Alcoyano, which resulted in a 1–0 loss and a 1–1 draw respectively. Cartagena's last match of the season, a 2–1 away win over Manacor on 1 May, was Marcos's 32nd appearance in a successful season, and he returned to Albacete that summer.

His long-awaited Albacete and La Liga debut arrived on 18 September 1994, after more than three years at the club, as he started in the home fixture against Real Madrid at Estadio Carlos Belmonte. Albacete secured a remarkable 1–1 draw against the giants, who would ultimately secure their 26th La Liga crown that season. He played 10 more times that year, establishing himself as a reliable back-up to future Spanish international José Francisco Molina, who had joined from Valencia that summer. The only low point was conceding 5 against Español at Sarrià Stadium on 30 October.

Albacete finished the season in 17th, behind Compostela only thanks to their head-to-head record, which meant they had to play in the Relegation play-offs. They lost on aggregate to Salamanca, but earned a reprieve after an administration scandal involving Sevilla and Celta Vigo. In the off-season, Molina departed for Atlético Madrid, allowing Marcos to start 1995–96 as first choice.

He played 25 league matches that season, but it was another difficult season for Albacete. They placed 20th, and were obliged to play another playoff. Marcos played in both matches, as they lost 1–0 to Extremadura at Estadio Francisco de la Hera on 30 May, and then by the same scoreline in the return leg three days later. This time, there was to be no reprieve: Albacete were relegated, and Marcos left the club that summer.

=== Racing Santander ===
Wanting to stay in the top flight, Marcos joined Racing Santander ahead of the 1996–97 season. He acted as back-up to Santander legend José María Ceballos, although he did feature more prominently in the run to the Copa del Rey quarter-finals. He made his debut in that competition on 6 November, in the away first leg of Santander's second round tie against SD Eibar. The match at Ipurua Municipal Stadium ended 1–1, with Óscar Arpón scoring the away goal that would ultimately send Santander through to the third round.

Having also played in the away leg in that round, another 1–1 draw with Real Zaragoza at La Romareda, he finally made his home debut in the return fixture on 15 January. He kept a clean sheet at El Sardinero as Santander won 1–0 and progressed to the round of 16. His had to wait until 6 April for his league debut, which came in a 2–2 draw with Real Betis at Estadio Benito Villamarín. He also featured in the next match at home to Rayo Vallecano: Ceballos was sent off with nine minutes remaining, and Marcos was brought on in place of Fernando Correa to see out the game. At that time, Santander were leading 1–0 thanks to Alberto's 12th-minute goal. However, Marcos's first responsibility was to face the penalty conceded by Ceballos, which Diego Klimowicz duly converted. Five minutes later, he also failed to keep out Guilherme, who gave Rayo a 2–1 win.

With Ceballos suspended, Marcos also played in the next match, a 5–1 win over Real Oviedo at Estadio Carlos Tartiere, for a total of seven that season. He was used similarly sparingly the following season, making three appearances each in the league and the Copa del Rey. 1998–99 was his busiest season with Santander, with 11 appearances in all competitions. Ceballos was injured in the second half of a 3–0 win over Extremadura at Estadio Francisco de la Hera on 7 March, and Marcos came off the bench to replace him.

He played in the next five matches while Ceballos recovered, but the first choice keeper returned after the 2–0 home loss to Espanyol on 18 April. This would turn out to be Marcos's last match in the top division, as he left Santander at the end of the season.

=== Motril ===
In search of regular first team football, Marcos joined Motril in Segunda División B in the summer of 1999. He began the season as second choice to Carlos Gómez, and had to wait until 14 January to make his debut. This came in a 1–1 home draw with Dos Hermanas at Estadio Escribano Castilla, and from then on he played 18 consecutive matches until the end of the season. Despite this run in the team, he left the club following their 2–1 home loss to Polideportivo Almería on the last day of the season.

=== Polideportivo Ejido ===
In 2000, 31 year old Marcos joined Polideportivo Ejido, and proceeded to have one of the best seasons of his career. His Ejido debut came against the same team as that for Motril, Dos Hermanas, in the preliminary round of the Copa del Rey. Ejido drew this away match 2–2, and ultimately won the tie 4–3 on aggregate. In between the two legs, Marcos made his league debut in a 3–2 home win over Linense on 3 September, and went on to appear in every league match except one that season. Ejido finished the year as group runners-up, and qualified for the promotion play-offs. Marcos appeared in all six play-off games against Atlético Madrid B, Calahorra and Espanyol B, including keeping three crucial clean sheets, as Ejido earned promotion to the Segunda División for the first time in their history.

In 2001–02, he started the season as first choice, but was gradually supplanted by Sergio Segura over the course of the year. A 2–1 loss on 5 January at El Sardinero against his former side, Racing Santander, proved to be his last match as a professional. He didn't feature at all for Ejido over the next two seasons, and finally retired in 2004 at the age of 35.

== Honours ==
Real Mallorca

- Segunda División fourth place: 1988–89 (earning promotion to La Liga)

Polideportivo Ejido

- Segunda División B runners-up: 2000–01 (earning promotion to Segunda División)

== Career statistics ==
As of 14 January 2021

| Club | Season | League | | | Cup | | Other | | Total | |
| Club | Season | Division | Apps | Goals | Apps | Goals | Apps | Goals | Apps | Goals |
|---|---|---|---|---|---|---|---|---|---|---|
| Real Mallorca | 1988–89 | Segunda División | 2 | 0 | 1 | 0 | 0 | 0 | 3 | 0 |
| Mallorca Atlético | 1989–90 | Segunda División B | 26 | 0 | – | – | – | – | 26 | 0 |
| Orihuela Deportiva | 1990–91 | Segunda División | 17 | 0 | 0 | 0 | – | – | 17 | 0 |
| Albacete Balompié | 1991–92 | La Liga | 0 | 0 | – | – | – | – | 0 | 0 |
| Albacete Balompié | 1992–93 | La Liga | 0 | 0 | 0 | 0 | – | – | 0 | 0 |
| Albacete Balompié | 1994–95 | La Liga | 10 | 0 | 1 | 0 | 0 | 0 | 11 | 0 |
| Albacete Balompié | 1995–96 | La Liga | 25 | 0 | 0 | 0 | 2 | 0 | 27 | 0 |
| Albacete Balompié | Total | | 35 | 0 | 1 | 0 | 2 | 0 | 38 | 0 |
| Cartagena FC | 1993–94 | Segunda División B | 30 | 0 | 2 | 0 | – | – | 32 | 0 |
| Racing Santander | 1996–97 | La Liga | 3 | 0 | 4 | 0 | – | – | 7 | 0 |
| Racing Santander | 1997–98 | La Liga | 3 | 0 | 3 | 0 | – | – | 6 | 0 |
| Racing Santander | 1998–99 | La Liga | 6 | 0 | 5 | 0 | – | – | 11 | 0 |
| Racing Santander | Total | | 12 | 0 | 12 | 0 | 0 | 0 | 24 | 0 |
| Motril | 1999–2000 | Segunda División B | 18 | 0 | – | – | – | – | 18 | 0 |
| Polideportivo Ejido | 2000–01 | Segunda División B | 35 | 0 | 2 | 0 | 6 | 0 | 43 | 0 |
| Polideportivo Ejido | 2001–02 | Segunda División | 11 | 0 | 1 | 0 | – | – | 12 | 0 |
| Polideportivo Ejido | 2002–03 | Segunda División | 0 | 0 | 0 | 0 | – | – | 0 | 0 |
| Polideportivo Ejido | 2003–04 | Segunda División | 0 | 0 | 0 | 0 | – | – | 0 | 0 |
| Polideportivo Ejido | Total | | 46 | 0 | 3 | 0 | 6 | 0 | 55 | 0 |
| Career total | | | 186 | 0 | 19 | 0 | 8 | 0 | 213 | 0 |

1. Appearances in the 1995–96 La Liga relegation playoff
2. Appearances in the 2001 Segunda División B play-offs
