= Sócrates Parri =

Spanish footballer (born 1966)

Personal information
- Full name: Sócrates Parri Romero
- Date of birth: 16 December 1966 (age 59)
- Place of birth: Burjassot, Spain
- Height: 1.80 m (5 ft 11 in)
- Position: Defender

Senior career*
Years	Team	Apps	(Gls)
1986–1989	Mestalla	33	(3)
1989–1991	Valencia	0	(0)
1991–1994	Albacete Balompié	40	(0)
1994–1995	Levante	9	(1)
Total		82	(4)
- * Club domestic league appearances and goals as of 4 February 2021

Sócrates Parri Romero (born 16 December 1966) is a Spanish former footballer who played as a defender. He began his career with Valencia, and later played 40 matches in La Liga with Albacete Balompié.

== Career ==
=== Early career ===
Parri was born in Burjassot in the comarca of Horta Nord in the Valencian Community, and began his career with Mestalla, the reserve team of local giants Valencia. In 1986–87, he helped Mestalla earn promotion from the Tercera División, and played 37 matches in the ensuing Segunda División B season. However, Mestalla were relegated straight back to the Tercera División after just one season. He was promoted to the Valencia first team squad for the 1989–90 season, but didn't make any appearances that year, or in the following season.

At the start of the 1991–92 season, Parri made what would turn out to be his only appearance for the Valencia first team. In the away first leg of their Copa del Rey third round tie against Arnedo on 11 September, he came on for Fernando for the last 15 minutes, with Valencia already 5–0 up. They won the game 6–0 after Leonardo completed his hattrick.

=== Albacete Balompié ===
Keen for an opportunity to play first team football, Parri left Valencia to join Albacete Balompié in January 1992. Albacete were enjoying their first ever season in La Liga, and Parri made his top flight debut for the club in a 1–0 away win over Real Sociedad at Atotxa Stadium on 5 January. He made his home debut a week later as Albacete drew 1–1 with Real Zaragoza at Estadio Carlos Belmonte. He missed only one league match before the end of the season, playing 22 times. The following season, Parri made 23 appearances, and scored his only goal for the club in a 2–0 home win over Realejos in the fourth round of the Copa del Rey.

However, Albacete ended the season 17th in the league, and were forced to play a relegation playoff against Real Mallorca. Parri came on as a substitute for José María Menéndez in the home second leg, which Albacete lost 2–1, but that was still sufficient to secure and aggregate victory and maintain their La Liga status for another year. This proved to be his last match for Albacete, as he fell dramatically out of favour and didn't play at all in 1993–94, before departing at the end of the season.

=== Levante ===
Parri returned to the city of Valencia to join Levante in Segunda División B in 1994. He was never a regular starter, and had to wait until 4 February to make his debut, which came in a 1–1 home draw with Ontinyent at Nou Estadi del Llevant. He scored a single goal in his ten matches that season, in stoppage time of a 3–1 away win over Manlleu on 14 May. At the end of the season, Levante topped their group and qualified for the promotion playoffs, although they fell short of promotion by finishing third in a group topped by Écija Balompié.

Parri featured only once in the playoffs, in the opening 0–0 draw with Pontevedra at Estadio Municipal de Pasarón on 27 May, and this would prove to be his last match as a professional, as he quit football at the end of the season aged just 28.

== Personal life ==
Parri's younger brother Líbero was also a professional footballer, playing as an attacking midfielder. Fifteen years younger than Sócrates, Líbero's career had many similarities: like his brother, he began his career with Valencia, failed to break into the first team, later had spells with both Albacete and Levante, and retired aged 28. He now works as an agent.

== Honours ==
Mestalla

- Tercera División: promotion to Segunda División B 1986–87

Valencia

- La Liga runners-up: 1989–90

Levante

- Segunda División B: 1994–95

== Career statistics ==
As of 5 February 2021

Club	Season	League			Cup		Other		Total	
Club	Season	Division	Apps	Goals	Apps	Goals	Apps	Goals	Apps	Goals
Valencia CF Mestalla	1986–87	Tercera División	?	?	1	0	–		1	0
Valencia CF Mestalla	1987–88	Segunda División B	33	3	4	0	–		37	3
Valencia CF Mestalla	1988–89	Tercera División	?	?	1	0	–		1	0
Valencia CF Mestalla	Total		33	3	6	0	0	0	39	3
Valencia	1989–90	La Liga	0	0	0	0	0	0	0	0
Valencia	1990–91	La Liga	0	0	0	0	0	0	0	0
Valencia	1991–92	La Liga	0	0	1	0	–		1	0
Valencia	Total		0	0	1	0	0	0	1	0
Albacete Balompié	1991–92	La Liga	22	0	0	0	–		22	0
Albacete Balompié	1992–93	La Liga	18	0	4	1	1	0	23	1
Albacete Balompié	1993–94	La Liga	0	0	0	0	–		0	0
Albacete Balompié	Total		40	0	4	1	1	0	45	1
Levante	1994–95	Segunda División B	9	1	0	0	1	0	10	1
Career total			82	4	11	1	2	0	95	5

1. Appearance in the 1992–93 La Liga relegation playoff
2. Appearance in the 1994–95 Segunda División B playoffs
