= Coco (footballer) =

Spanish footballer (born 1969)

Personal information
- Full name: Rafael Collado García
- Date of birth: 1 July 1969 (age 57)
- Place of birth: Albacete, Spain
- Height: 1.83 m (6 ft 0 in)
- Positions: Right-back; centre-back

Youth career
- –1988: Albacete Balompié

Senior career*
Years	Team	Apps	(Gls)
1988–1996	Albacete Balompié	227	(4)
1996–1998	Osasuna	10	(0)
1998–2000	Yeclano	12	(1)
1999	→ Calahorra (loan)	14	(0)
1999–2000	→ Linares (loan)		
2000–2001	Linares	19	(0)
2001	Quintanar del Rey		
2002	Mejoreño		
2002–2004	Logroñés		
Total		282	(5)
- * Club domestic league appearances and goals as of 17 January 2021

Rafael Collado García (born 1 July 1969), known as Coco, is a Spanish former footballer who played initially as a right-back, and later in his career as a centre-back.

He began his career with Albacete Balompié, and played with them for the most successful period of his career. He helped them to La Liga promotion in 1990–91, and played 160 top flight matches over the next five years. He left the club as they were relegated in 1995–96, and saw out his career with a succession of lower league clubs.

== Career ==
=== Albacete Balompié ===
Coco was born in Albacete in the autonomous community of Castilla–La Mancha, and began his career with local club Albacete Balompié. He made his debut for Albacete, then in Segunda División B, on 12 March 1989 in a 1–1 away draw against Alcoyano. It was an inauspicious debut, as he was sent off with three minutes remaining at Estadio El Collao. Nonetheless, he was able to make his home debut two weeks later, as Albacete beat Lorca Deportiva 2–0 at Estadio Carlos Belmonte. He ultimately made 12 appearances that season.

In 1989–90, Coco played a crucial part as Albacete topped their group and earned promotion to the Segunda División. He played 25 times, and also scored his first Albacete goal, which came right at the death in an excellent 5–1 away win over Maspalomas on 4 November.

His Segunda División debut came on the opening day of the following season, as Albacete got off to a winning start with a 2–0 win at home to Palamós. A week later he scored an own goal just five minutes into the match against Lleida at Camp d'Esports, which proved to be the only goal of the game. Despite this, Coco had another successful season, with 30 appearances. It was also a miraculous season for the club, who won the Segunda División at the first attempt to secure a second successive promotion, and reach La Liga for the first time in their history.

Albacete began their inaugural top flight season in 1991–92 against Osasuna on 1 September, and Coco played the full 90 minutes as they lost 2–0 at El Sadar Stadium. Better was to come a week later, with a superb 1–0 home win over Valencia, which was to set the tone for another brilliant season, in which Coco played 30 times in all competitions. His club ended the year 7th in the league, only missing out on qualification for the 1992–93 UEFA Cup by a single point. The following season he played an even bigger role, with 37 appearances, despite being sent off twice: away to Valencia on 22 November, and to Sevilla on 31 January. The year was a greater struggle for the club, though, who were forced to play a relegation playoff after finishing 17th. Coco played in both legs as they beat Real Mallorca to retain their La Liga place.

1993–94 again brought 37 appearances, and a maiden La Liga goal, which came late in a 4–1 win over Celta Vigo at Balaídos on 12 December. The following season was the busiest of his Albacete career, with 40 appearances in all competitions, although another 17th-place finish meant another playoff. Coco featured in the first leg against Salamanca, which Albacete won 2–0 at Helmántico Stadium, but was absent for the embarrassing 5–0 reversal in the home leg, which should have ensured their relegation. However, the administration scandal involving Sevilla and Celta Vigo saw them handed a reprieve.

In 1995–96, Coco played 38 matches, scoring twice: in a 4–0 home win over Celta Vigo on 24 September, and in a remarkable 5–5 draw with Racing Santander at El Sardinero on 7 January. A 20th-place finish meant yet another playoff for Albacete, and after losing this time there would be no reprieve. The 1–0 losses both home and away against Extremadura would prove to be Coco's last for the club; he left at the end of the season after 250 appearances and five goals in eight years.

=== Osasuna ===
Coco joined Osasuna ahead of the 1996–97 Segunda División season. His debut for his new club came in the away first leg of their Copa del Rey first round tie against Gimnástica de Torrelavega on 5 September. The match at El Malecón ended 1–0 to the visitors, and Coco also played as they followed this up with a 2–0 win at El Sadar Stadium twelve days later. However, he had to wait until 13 October to make his league debut, which came in a home match against his former club, Albacete, which finished 1–1. He struggled to establish himself at Osasuna, and managed a total of 15 appearances in his first season with the Pamplona club.

The following year, however, he played just once, in a 1–0 away loss to Segunda División B side Barakaldo in the first round of the Copa del Rey on 3 September. Seeking more playing opportunities, he left the club at the end of the season.

=== Yeclano ===
For 1998–99, Coco dropped down a division, joining Yeclano in Segunda División B. He was immediately in the starting lineup, making his debut in the first match of the season away to Elche on 29 August. His new club lost the match at the Estadio Manuel Martínez Valero 2–0, and they also lost nine days later as he made his home debut against Sabadell. He played in 12 of Yeclano's first 13 matches, including scoring what would turn out to be his only goal for the club in the 2–0 home win over Espanyol B on 8 November. However, he fell out of favour after this, and joined Calahorra on loan in January.

He made his Calahorra debut in a 1–0 away win over Gernika on 24 January, and followed it up with his home debut a week later. This came against Osasuna B, who won the match 1–0. He played 14 times for Calahorra, with the lowpoint coming as he was sent off in stoppage time of a 2–0 home victory over Burgos on 14 March.

=== Linares ===
Coco joined Linares in 1999, and helped them earn promotion from the Tercera División in his first season. 2000–01 saw him make 19 appearances, including a 17-minute cameo in a 2–1 away loss to Don Benito on 6 May which would prove to be his last in Spain's top three divisions. Linares finished the season in 18th, and were relegated immediately back to the Tercera División.

=== Later career ===
Coco briefly joined Quintanar del Rey in 2001, before an equally short spell with fellow Tercera División side Mejoreño. He finished his career with two years at Logroñés, retiring in 2004.

== Honours ==
Albacete Balompie

- Segunda División B: 1989–90
- Segunda División: 1990–91

Linares

- Tercera División runners-up: 1999–2000 (earning promotion to Segunda División B)

== Career statistics ==
Appearances and goals by club, season and competition
Club	Season	League			Cup		Other		Total	
Club	Season	Division	Apps	Goals	Apps	Goals	Apps	Goals	Apps	Goals
Albacete Balompié	1988–89	Segunda División B	12	0	0	0	–	–	12	0
Albacete Balompié	1989–90	Segunda División B	25	1	–	–	–	–	25	1
Albacete Balompié	1990–91	Segunda División	30	0	0	0	–	–	30	0
Albacete Balompié	1991–92	La Liga	29	0	2	0	–	–	31	0
Albacete Balompié	1992–93	La Liga	30	0	5	1	2 (Note: Appearances in the 1992–93 La Liga relegation playoff)	0	37	1
Albacete Balompié	1993–94	La Liga	35	1	2	0	–	–	37	1
Albacete Balompié	1994–95	La Liga	32	0	7	0	1 (Note: Appearance in the 1994–95 La Liga relegation playoff)	0	40	0
Albacete Balompié	1995–96	La Liga	34	2	2	0	2 (Note: Appearances in the 1995–96 La Liga relegation playoff)	0	38	2
Albacete Balompié	Total		227	4	18	1	5	0	250	5
Osasuna	1996–97	Segunda División	10	0	5	0	–	–	15	0
Osasuna	1997–98	Segunda División	0	0	1	0	–	–	1	0
Osasuna	Total		10	0	6	0	0	0	16	0
Yeclano	1998–99	Segunda División B	12	1	–	–	–	–	12	1
Calahorra (loan)	1998–99	Segunda División B	14	0	0	0	–	–	14	0
Linares (loan)	2000–01	Segunda División B	19	0	–	–	–	–	19	0
Quintanar del Rey	2001–02	Tercera División	?	?	1	0	–	–	1	0
Career total			282	5	25	1	5	0	312	6
