= José María Menéndez =

Spanish footballer

Personal information
- Full name: José María Cabrera Menéndez
- Date of birth: 29 December 1963 (age 62)
- Place of birth: Samartín de Podes, Spain
- Height: 1.77 m (5 ft 10 in)
- Positions: Left midfielder; inside left

Youth career
- –1982: Sporting de Gijón

Senior career*
Years	Team	Apps	(Gls)
1982–1983	Real Avilés	32	(0)
1983–1984	San Martín	30	(4)
1984–1986	Langreo	73	(24)
1986–1987	Lugo	38	(6)
1987–1988	Lorca Deportiva	37	(5)
1988–1989	Real Avilés Industrial	36	(7)
1989–1994	Albacete Balompié	182	(20)
1994–1996	Real Betis	50	(2)
1996–1998	Albacete Balompié	64	(11)
Total		542	(79)
- * Club domestic league appearances and goals

José María Cabrera Menéndez (born 29 December 1963) is a Spanish former footballer who played as a left midfielder or inside left.

Menéndez played for a number of clubs in his native Spain, being most closely associated with Albacete Balompié. He played 108 times in La Liga for Albacete, scoring 15 goals, and later added another 50 appearances and two goals with Real Betis.

== Career ==
=== Early career ===
Menéndez was born in Samartín de Podes in the Gozón municipality, within the province and autonomous community of Asturias, and began his career in the youth setup of Asturian club Sporting de Gijón. He left the club in 1982 to begin his senior career with Real Avilés. He spent one season each in the Tercera División with Avilés and San Martín, and then two with Langreo. In his second season with Langreo, he helped them win their Tercera División group.

=== Lugo ===
Menéndez took a step up by joining Lugo in Segunda División B ahead of the 1986–87 season. He made his debut for the club, who were newly promoted from the Tercera División, in the first match of the season, a 0–0 home draw with Pontevedra at Estadio Anxo Carro on 31 August. He scored his first Lugo goal on 28 September, in a 2–2 home draw with Atlético Madrileño, one of six he would score in his 40 matches that year. However, he left the club at the end of the season, and his final match was the 2–1 home defeat by Eibar on 31 May.

=== Lorca Deportiva ===
Menéndez's next club, also in Segunda División B, was Lorca Deportiva, who he joined in 1987. He was an immediate fixture in the starting eleven, making his debut in their first match of the season, a 1–0 home loss to Polideportivo Almería on 30 August. He had to wait until 7 February to net his first Lorca goal, which came in a 2–2 home draw with Mestalla, but ended the season with five in his 41 appearances, including a brace in the 6–0 home win over Conquense on 24 April. Again, he moved on after just one season, and his last game for the club was a 1–0 home win over Ceuta on 22 May 1988.

=== Return to Avilés ===
Ahead of the 1988–89 season, Menéndez returned to the club who had given him his start in the professional game. In his absence, the club had been renamed Real Avilés Industrial, and earned promotion to Segunda División B. He played 38 matches that year, scoring seven times, but the summer of 1989 was the fourth in succession in which he changed clubs. His last appearance before leaving Avilés for good was a 2–0 home win over Ponferradina at Estadio Román Suárez Puerta on 25 June.

=== Albacete Balompié ===
Menéndez's fifth club in as many years was to be Albacete Balompié, whom he joined in 1989, thus beginning the most successful chapter of his career. He quickly became in indispensable part of Albacete's team, and started their first match of the 1989–90 Segunda División B campaign, a 1–0 away win over Mérida at Estadio Romano on 3 September. He made his home debut at Estadio Carlos Belmonte a week later, as Albacete beat Telde 2–0. In his third match, at home to Real Jaén on 17 September, he scored from the penalty spot as Albacete once again won 2–0. He ultimately scored five goals in 38 appearances that season. These early victories set the tone for Albacete's season, as they won their group and earned promotion to the Segunda División.

Menéndez made his debut at second tier level on 2 September, as Albacete got off to a winning start with a 2–0 home victory over Palamós. This set the scene for another successful season for both player and club: Menéndez played 36 matches, while Albacete won the Segunda División title and earned promotion to La Liga for the first time in their history. His role in the double promotion secured his legendary status at Albacete, where he was revered for his runs up the left wing, the power of his shots, and the precision of his long passes.

This allowed Menéndez to make his top flight debut in 1991–92, which he duly did in the first match of the season, a 2–0 loss to Osasuna at Estadio El Sadar. He scored his first La Liga goal, and his first for Albacete in over a year, when they beat Atlético Madrid 3–1 at home on 26 January. Menéndez got on the scoresheet once more in his 39 appearances that year, a consolation in a 3–1 loss to Real Burgos at Estadio El Plantío on 26 April. The following season was the busiest of his professional career, playing 44 matches and scoring three times.

However, the season was more of a struggle for the club, who found themselves 17th in the table and facing a relegation playoff. In the first leg against Real Mallorca at Lluís Sitjar Stadium, Menéndez scored the opening goal as Albacete won 3–1. Despite a 2–1 loss in the return leg, the aggregate score was sufficient for Albacete to retain their top flight status for another year.

In 1993–94, Menéndez found the best goal scoring form of his career, netting 13 times in 36 appearances and becoming Albacete's top scorer. However, his contract expired at the end of the season, and despite a desire to resign, he and the club couldn't reach an agreement, either in terms of remuneration or duration.

=== Real Betis ===
By this time he had established a reputation as one of the most effective attacking players in the top flight. His finishing, as well as his ability to assist other goalscorers, drew admirers, and newly promoted Real Betis had no hesitation in signing him in 1994. He made his debut for Los Verdiblancos in their first match of the season, a 0–0 away draw with Logroñés at Estadio Las Gaunas on 4 September. A week later, he appeared in front of the home fans at Estadio Benito Villamarín as Betis took on his old club, Albacete, and emerged as 4–1 winners. He scored his first Betis goal, his only one in his 42 matches that season, in a 1–1 draw with Sporting de Gijón at El Molinón on 25 February.

His opportunities were more limited in 1995–96, for two reason. The first was silly injury to his little finger, incurred while making the bed. The second was the signing of Croatian international left winger Robert Jarni, who established himself above Menéndez in the pecking order. The result was that Menéndez made only 22 appearances that season, mostly as a substitute, and scored just once, in a 1–0 victory over Real Oviedo at Estadio Carlos Tartiere on 1 October. On a more positive note, Betis's excellent 3rd-place finish in their first La Liga campaign had qualified them for the 1995–96 UEFA Cup. Menéndez made his European debut in the first leg of their first round tie against Fenerbahçe of Turkey, held on 12 September at Şükrü Saracoğlu Stadium. He came on for Jarni with three minutes remaining as Betis won 2–1.

He was again used as a substitute in the second leg, replacing the injured Jarni after less than half an hour and helping Betis to a 2–0 win and comfortable progress to the next round. He played in every match, always as a substitute, as Betis reached the third round before being eliminated by Bordeaux of France. He slipped even further in the pecking order in 1996, as Betis signed another Croatian, his former teammate Nenad Bjelica, from Albacete, and he was released from his contract at the end of the season. His final match for Betis was a 3–1 defeat by Real Valladolid at Estadio José Zorrilla on 25 May.

=== Return to Albacete ===
Swapping places with Bjelica, Menéndez returned to Albacete ahead of the 1996–97 season. The club had suffered relegation at the end of the previous season, thanks to a playoff loss against Extremadura, and were now playing in the Segunda División. He played 34 matches in the first season of his return, and 35 in 1997–98, scoring six goals in each, before retiring in 1998 at the age of 34. His final match was a 1–1 home draw with Atlético Madrid B on 10 May 1998.

== Career statistics ==
As of 1 February 2021

Club	Season	League			Cup		Europe		Other		Total	
Club	Season	Division	Apps	Goals	Apps	Goals	Apps	Goals	Apps	Goals	Apps	Goals
Real Avilés	1982–83	Tercera División	32	0	—		—		—		32	0
San Martín	1983–84	Tercera División	30	4	—		—		—		30	4
Langreo	1984–85	Tercera División	35	10	2	0	—		—		37	10
Langreo	1985–86	Tercera División	38	14	3	0	—		—		41	14
Langreo	Total		73	24	5	0	0	0	0	0	78	24
Lugo	1986–87	Segunda División B	38	6	2	0	—		—		40	6
Lorca Deportiva	1987–88	Segunda División B	37	5	4	0	—		—		41	5
Real Avilés Industrial	1988–89	Segunda División B	36	7	2	0	—		—		38	7
Albacete Balompié	1989–90	Segunda División B	38	5	—		—		—		38	5
Albacete Balompié	1990–91	Segunda División	36	0	0	0	—		—		36	0
Albacete Balompié	1991–92	La Liga	37	2	2	0	—		—		39	2
Albacete Balompié	1992–93	La Liga	36	1	6	1	—		2	1	44	3
Albacete Balompié	1993–94	La Liga	35	12	1	1	—		—		36	13
Albacete Balompié	Total		182	20	9	2	0	0	2	1	193	23
Real Betis	1994–95	La Liga	36	1	6	0	—		—		42	1
Real Betis	1995–96	La Liga	14	1	2	0	6	0	—		22	1
Real Betis	Total		50	1	8	0	6	0	0	0	64	2
Albacete Balompié	1996–97	Segunda División	31	6	3	0	—		—		34	6
Albacete Balompié	1997–98	Segunda División	33	5	2	1	—		—		35	6
Albacete Balompié	Total		64	11	5	1	0	0	0	0	69	12
Career total			542	79	35	3	6	0	2	1	585	83

1. Appearances in the 1992–93 La Liga relegation playoff
2. Appearances in the 1995–96 UEFA Cup

== Honours ==
Langreo

- Tercera División: 1985–86

Albacete Balompié

- Segunda División B: 1989–90
- Segunda División: 1990–91
