= Jesús Unanua =

Spanish footballer (born 1969)

Personal information
- Full name: Jesús Unanua Becerril
- Date of birth: 23 June 1969 (age 57)
- Place of birth: Pamplona, Spain
- Height: 1.80 m (5 ft 11 in)
- Position: Goalkeeper

Youth career
- Osasuna

Senior career*
Years	Team	Apps	(Gls)
1988–1990	Osasuna B	54	(0)
1990–1996	Osasuna	47	(0)
1992–1993	→ Albacete (loan)	13	(0)
1996–1999	Leganés	76	(0)
1999–2003	Villarreal	3	(0)
2003–2004	Xerez	38	(0)
2004–2006	Elche	55	(0)
2006–2009	Alicante	98	(0)
Total		384	(0)

International career
1986	Spain U18	2	(0)
- * Club domestic league appearances and goals

Jesús Unanua Becerril (born 23 June 1969) is a Spanish former professional footballer who played as a goalkeeper.

He played 204 Segunda División matches over ten seasons, in representation of six teams. He was almost exclusively a backup in La Liga, appearing in the competition with Osasuna, Albacete and Villarreal.

== Club career ==
Born in Pamplona, Navarre, Unanua began his professional career with hometown side CA Osasuna, playing 13 La Liga games in the 1989–90 season. However, he never managed to become first-choice during his early years, and, after a loan spell at Albacete Balompié (also as backup), he returned to his first club, being once again barred, now by youngster Javier López Vallejo, another youth graduate.

After three seasons at Segunda División team CD Leganés, Unanua moved to Villarreal CF, achieving top-flight promotion in his first year although he appeared in no matches, being once again cast aside by Vallejo whom signed at the same time – both players lost importance in the 2002–03 campaign, after the arrival of FC Barcelona's Pepe Reina.

Unanua featured the most he had in years in 2003–04, as he helped Xerez CD to a ninth place. He continued his career also in the second division, with Elche CF.

In 2006, Unanua dropped down to the Segunda División B but stayed in the Valencian Community, joining Alicante CF. In his first year he helped to a return to the second tier after 52 years, and won the Ricardo Zamora Trophy for the season in the competition with only 19 goals conceded in 35 games.

On 17 June 2009, shortly after having been relegated to the bench by manager José Carlos Granero, Unanua announced his retirement from professional football. He played his last match on the 20th between already relegated teams Alicante and Sevilla Atlético (3–3), three days shy of his 40th birthday.

Subsequently, Unanua worked as goalkeeper coach at Villarreal and Real Oviedo.
