= Raúl Dos Santos =

Uruguayan footballer (1967–2024)

Personal information
- Full name: Raúl Ricardo dos Santos González
- Date of birth: 19 April 1967
- Place of birth: Montevideo, Uruguay
- Date of death: 4 July 2024 (aged 57)
- Height: 1.70 m (5 ft 7 in)
- Position: Forward

Senior career*
Years	Team	Apps	(Gls)
1987–1990	Basáñez		
1991–1992	Defensor Sporting		
1992–1994	Albacete	46	(15)
1994–1996	Villarreal	36	(12)
1996	Defensor Sporting		
1997	Bolivar		
1998	Progreso		
1999	Cerro		

International career
1992–1993	Uruguay	2	(0)
- * Club domestic league appearances and goals

Raúl Ricardo dos Santos González (19 April 1967 – 4 July 2024) was a Uruguayan footballer who played as a forward.

== Club career ==
Dos Santos began his career in his native Uruguay, playing for Basáñez. In 1991, Dos Santos signed for Defensor Sporting, playing for the club for a year. In 1992, Dos Santos moved to Spain, signing for Albacete. During his time with the La Liga team, Dos Santos scored 15 league goals in 46 games. In 1994, Dos Santos signed for Segunda División club Villarreal. During his two seasons with Villarreal, Dos Santos played 36 league games, scoring twelve times. In 1996, returned to Uruguay, re-signing for former club Defensor Sporting. In 1997, Dos Santos moved to Bolivia, signing for Bolivar. After a season with Bolivar, Dos Santos returned to Uruguay, signing for Progreso. In 1999, Dos Santos played for Cerro before his retirement.

== International career ==
Dos Santos represented Uruguay twice, making his debut against Poland on 29 November 1992.

== Death ==
Dos Santos died from pancreatic cancer in Uruguay on 4 July 2024, at the age of 57.
