= José Zalazar =

Uruguayan footballer (born 1963)

José Luis Zalazar
Personal information
- Full name: José Luis Zalazar Rodríguez
- Date of birth: 26 October 1963 (age 63)
- Place of birth: Montevideo, Uruguay
- Height: 1.82 m (6 ft 0 in)
- Position: Attacking midfielder

Senior career*
Years	Team	Apps	(Gls)
1982–1986	Peñarol	98	(41)
1986–1987	Tecos UAG	20	(11)
1987–1988	Cádiz	33	(6)
1988–1990	Espanyol	16	(1)
1990–1996	Albacete	218	(72)
1996–1997	Racing Santander	39	(4)
1997	Nacional	17	(3)
1997	Bella Vista	13	(3)
1998–1999	Albacete	12	(0)
Total		466	(141)

International career
1984–1993	Uruguay	29	(4)
- * Club domestic league appearances and goals

José Luis Zalazar Rodríguez (born 26 October 1963) is a Uruguayan retired professional footballer who played mostly as an attacking midfielder.

Nicknamed El Oso (Bear), he played most of his career in Spain, especially with Albacete, being part of the club's most long tenure in La Liga. He was also notable for his strong and accurate right-foot shot, as demonstrated with several goals from long distance, particularly from free kicks.

An Uruguay international for nearly one decade, Zalazar represented the country at the 1986 World Cup.

== Club career ==
Born in Montevideo, Zalazar started his career at local club Peñarol in 1982. After the 1986 FIFA World Cup he joined Mexican club Universidad Autónoma de Guadalajara where, in his first year, he was the highest goalscorer of the tournament with 23 goals overall. He then moved to Spain, where he played with Cádiz one season before returning to Mexico for 1988–89, again with the Tecos.

Zalazar returned to Spain in 1989, playing one year in its second division with Español. He then joined Albacete, where he would have his most successful period, playing six seasons and being part of the squad known as Queso Mecánico ("Clockwork Cheese"). He started his spell at the Castilla–La Mancha team in the second level, scoring 15 times in all 38 matches in an eventual promotion – including two crucial ones against Salamanca.

During 1991–92's La Liga, Zalazar again played in all the games, adding 13 goals and helping Albacete finish in seventh place, the highest position ever reached by the club in the top division. His performances earned him the EFE Trophy by Spanish news agency EFE, awarded to the best Ibero-American player in the competition every year. During his career at Albacete, he also became the club's all-time leader in top level appearances, with 180 matches, and goals, with 57.

After Albacete was relegated back to division two at the end of 1995–96, Zalazar left for Racing Santander for one single campaign. The following year, he returned to Uruguay, playing in the 1997 Apertura tournament for hometown's Nacional and in the Clausura for Bella Vista. After a brief retirement, the 35-year-old rejoined Albacete, still in the second tier, leaving the game for good at the end of the season.

== International career ==
Zalazar obtained a total of 29 caps for the Uruguay national team. Having made his official debut on 13 June 1984 against England in a 2–0 win, he was part of the squad at the 1986 FIFA World Cup, making his only appearance of the tournament during the second half of a group stage 1–6 loss to Denmark.

Zalazar also played six matches during the 1994 World Cup qualification process, his last representing Uruguay, which did not qualify.

== Personal life ==
Zalazar has three sons and all of them are footballers. His eldest son Kuki Zalazar is a former Spanish youth international and currently plays as forward for Ceuta. Rodrigo Zalazar is a Uruguayan international and currently plays as a midfielder for Portuguese club Sporting CP, while his youngest son Mauro Zalazar also plays as a midfielder for German club Schalke 04.
