= Yeclano CF =

Yeclano
- Full name: Yeclano Club de Fútbol
- Founded: 1950
- Dissolved: 2004
- Ground: La Constitución, Yecla, Murcia, Spain
- Capacity: 4,000
Home colours	Away colours

Yeclano Club de Fútbol was a Spanish football club based in Yecla, in the Region of Murcia. Founded in 1950 under the name of Club Deportivo Hispania de Yecla, it was dissolved in 2004.

After Yeclano's dissolution, another club in the city named Yeclano Deportivo was created.

== Season to season ==
- As CD Hispania de Yecla

Season	Tier	Division	Place	Copa del Rey
1950–51	5	2ª Reg.	—	
1951–52	DNP			
1952–53	DNP			
1953–54	DNP			
1954–55	5	2ª Reg.	3rd	
1955–56	DNP			
1956–57	DNP			
1957–58	DNP			
1958–59	5	2ª Reg.	2nd	
1959–60	4	1ª Reg.	13th	

- As Yeclano CF

Season	Tier	Division	Place	Copa del Rey
1960–61	4	1ª Reg.	14th	
1961–62	4	1ª Reg.	11th	
1962–63	4	1ª Reg.	16th	
1963–64	4	1ª Reg.	2nd	
1964–65	4	1ª Reg.	8th	
1965–66	4	1ª Reg.	2nd	
1966–67	3	3ª	12th	
1967–68	3	3ª	13th	
1968–69	4	1ª Reg.	4th	
1969–70	4	1ª Reg.	2nd	
1970–71	4	1ª Reg.	9th	
1971–72	4	Reg. Pref.	10th	
1972–73	4	Reg. Pref.	9th	
1973–74	4	Reg. Pref.	1st	
1974–75	3	3ª	17th	Second round
1975–76	4	Reg. Pref.	1st	
1976–77	3	3ª	14th	First round
1977–78	4	3ª	20th	First round
1978–79	5	Reg. Pref.	4th	
1979–80	5	Reg. Pref.	6th	
1980–81	4	3ª	3rd	
1981–82	4	3ª	11th	First round

Season	Tier	Division	Place	Copa del Rey
1982–83	4	3ª	12th	
1983–84	4	3ª	4th	
1984–85	4	3ª	3rd	First round
1985–86	4	3ª	9th	First round
1986–87	4	3ª	11th	
1987–88	4	3ª	7th	
1988–89	4	3ª	2nd	
1989–90	4	3ª	1st	
1990–91	3	2ª B	15th	Second round
1991–92	3	2ª B	3rd	Third round
1992–93	3	2ª B	6th	Third round
1993–94	3	2ª B	10th	Fifth round
1994–95	3	2ª B	6th	Second round
1995–96	3	2ª B	13th	First round
1996–97	3	2ª B	10th	
1997–98	3	2ª B	13th	
1998–99	3	2ª B	13th	
1999–2000	3	2ª B	18th	
2000–01	4	3ª	3rd	
2001–02	4	3ª	2nd	
2002–03	4	3ª	2nd	
2003–04	3	2ª B	18th	

- 11 seasons in Segunda División B
- 18 seasons in Tercera División
