= Juan Carlos Balaguer =

Spanish footballer

Personal information
- Full name: Juan Carlos Balaguer Zamora
- Date of birth: 6 May 1966 (age 60)
- Place of birth: Valencia, Spain
- Height: 1.84 m (6 ft 1/2 in)
- Position: Goalkeeper

Youth career
- Valencia
- Don Bosco

Senior career*
| Years | Team | Apps | (Gls) |
| 1984–1990 | Valencia B | | |
| 1990–1996 | Albacete | 80 | (0) |
| 1996–1997 | Mérida | 14 | (0) |
| 1997–1998 | Levante | 7 | (0) |
| 1998–1999 | Murcia | 24 | (0) |
| 1999–2000 | Talavera | 1 | (0) |
| Total | | 126 | (0) |
- * Club domestic league appearances and goals

Juan Carlos Balaguer Zamora (born 6 May 1966) is a Spanish retired footballer who played as a goalkeeper.

== Club career ==
Born in Valencia, Balaguer emerged through local Valencia's youth system, but only appeared for its B-team as a senior. In 1990, he signed for Albacete, contributing with two games in his first season as the club got promoted to La Liga for the first time ever.

Balaguer made his debut in the top division on 22 March 1992, in a 2–0 away win against Sporting Gijón. He eventually became the starter over Costa Rican Luis Gabelo Conejo, but returned to the substitutes bench after the arrival of José Francisco Molina in the summer of 1994.

From 1996 until his retirement, four years later, Balaguer competed in Segunda División and Segunda División B, representing Mérida, Levante, Murcia and Talavera. He later worked as a goalkeeping coach, with Albacete, Castellón, Villarreal and Hércules.
