= 1985–86 Segunda División =

55th season of the second-tier football league in Spain

Segunda División
- Season: 1985–86
- Champions: Real Murcia
- Promoted: Real Murcia; CE Sabadell CF; RCD Mallorca
- Relegated: Albacete Balompié; Deportivo Aragón; CD Tenerife; At Madrileño
- Matches: 380
- Goals: 937 (2.47 per match)
- Top goalscorer: (Spain) Alcañiz

The 1985–86 Segunda División season saw 20 teams participate in the second flight Spanish league. Real Murcia won the league.

Real Murcia, CE Sabadell FC and RCD Mallorca were promoted to Primera División. Albacete Bp., Deportivo Aragón, CD Tenerife and Atlético Madrileño were relegated to Segunda División B.

== Teams ==
Location of teams in Segunda División 1985-86
Canary Islands

Team	Home city	Stadium
Albacete Balompié	Albacete	Carlos Belmonte
Deportivo Aragón	Zaragoza	La Romareda
Atlético Madrileño	Madrid	Vicente Calderón
Barcelona Atlètic	Barcelona	Mini Estadi
Bilbao Athletic	Bilbao	San Mamés
Cartagena FC	Cartagena	El Almarjal
CD Castellón	Castellón de la Plana	Castalia
Castilla CF	Madrid	Ciudad Deportiva
Deportivo La Coruña	A Coruña	Riazor
Elche CF	Elche	Nuevo Estadio
CD Logroñés	Logroño	Las Gaunas
CD Málaga	Málaga	La Rosaleda
RCD Mallorca	Mallorca	Lluís Sitjar
Real Murcia	Murcia	La Condomina
Real Oviedo	Oviedo	Carlos Tartiere
Rayo Vallecano	Madrid	Vallecas
Recreativo de Huelva	Huelva	Colombino
CE Sabadell	Sabadell	Nova Creu Alta
Sestao SC	Sestao	Las Llanas
CD Tenerife	Santa Cruz de Tenerife	Heliodoro Rodríguez López

== Final table ==
Pos	Team	Pld	W	D	L	GF	GA	GD	Pts	Promotion or relegation
1	Real Murcia	38	22	8	8	66	30	+36	52	Promoted to Primera División
2	CE Sabadell FC	38	15	16	7	49	30	+19	46	Promoted to Primera División
3	RCD Mallorca	38	18	10	10	54	37	+17	46	Promoted to Primera División
4	Elche CF	38	19	7	12	44	36	+8	45	
5	CD Castellón	38	18	9	11	61	42	+19	45	
6	Deportivo de La Coruña	38	17	11	10	52	38	+14	45	
7	Bilbao Athletic	38	18	8	12	53	51	+2	44	
8	Real Oviedo	38	17	10	11	45	36	+9	44	
9	Recreativo de Huelva	38	17	8	13	63	55	+8	42	
10	Sestao	38	16	7	15	49	45	+4	39	
11	CD Málaga	38	13	11	14	46	47	−1	37	
12	Castilla CF	38	14	6	18	45	61	−16	34	
13	Barcelona Atlètic	38	13	8	17	41	48	−7	34	
14	Cartagena FC	38	10	14	14	37	41	−4	34	
15	Rayo Vallecano	38	12	9	17	46	54	−8	33	
16	CD Logroñés	38	10	13	15	46	44	+2	33	
17	Albacete Bp.	38	12	7	19	35	62	−27	31	Relegated to Segunda División B
18	Deportivo Aragón	38	9	10	19	35	55	−20	28	Relegated to Segunda División B
19	CD Tenerife	38	8	10	20	43	59	−16	26	Relegated to Segunda División B
20	Atlético Madrileño	38	8	6	24	27	66	−39	22	Relegated to Segunda División B

Source: BDFutbol

== Results ==
Home \ Away	ALB	ARA	ATM	BAR	BIL	CAR	CAS	CST	DEP	ELC	LOG	MGA	MLL	MUR	OVI	RAY	REC	SAB	SES	TEN
Albacete	—	4–1	3–2	2–1	1–0	1–1	0–0	0–2	1–0	1–2	0–0	0–1	2–0	0–2	0–0	4–1	2–1	2–2	2–1	1–0
Dep. Aragón	1–0	—	1–2	0–0	1–2	1–1	1–2	0–1	2–1	3–2	0–1	2–3	3–2	1–0	1–0	2–2	1–0	0–3	1–1	3–1
At. Madrileño	2–1	0–1	—	1–3	0–1	0–1	1–4	2–0	1–0	0–1	1–0	1–1	0–1	0–3	0–3	2–1	0–0	0–0	1–3	0–0
Barcelona At.	1–2	2–1	1–3	—	0–1	1–1	3–1	4–0	1–0	1–1	2–1	2–2	4–1	1–1	1–0	1–0	2–1	0–1	0–2	1–0
Bilbao Ath.	2–0	1–1	5–0	6–2	—	4–0	2–1	3–1	2–0	2–0	2–0	0–1	2–1	1–0	2–1	1–3	3–2	0–0	2–0	2–1
Cartagena	4–0	0–0	0–1	0–2	1–1	—	1–1	0–1	1–1	2–1	0–0	1–1	0–0	1–2	0–0	2–0	1–0	1–1	3–0	2–0
Castellón	5–1	2–2	4–0	0–1	0–0	1–0	—	4–0	3–2	0–0	3–2	2–1	0–0	1–1	2–0	4–2	5–1	0–3	4–0	3–1
Castilla	5–0	1–0	2–1	1–0	1–0	2–1	1–0	—	1–1	2–3	3–1	2–0	1–1	0–3	2–3	1–0	3–4	1–1	3–2	1–3
Deportivo	3–0	3–0	2–1	1–0	4–0	2–1	1–1	1–0	—	2–0	1–1	3–0	1–1	2–1	2–2	2–1	2–1	1–1	0–0	2–1
Elche	1–0	2–0	3–0	2–0	2–1	2–1	2–0	2–1	2–0	—	1–0	0–0	1–0	0–0	0–0	3–1	0–2	0–0	2–1	1–2
Logroñés	0–1	1–0	2–2	0–0	6–0	1–1	0–1	3–1	3–0	2–1	—	2–2	1–2	1–2	2–0	0–1	3–0	1–0	1–1	4–2
Málaga	0–0	1–0	3–0	0–0	6–1	1–3	3–0	1–0	1–3	1–2	0–0	—	0–0	0–1	1–1	2–1	2–0	1–1	2–3	2–1
Mallorca	3–1	4–1	3–0	1–0	2–0	0–0	4–1	1–0	1–2	1–0	2–1	3–2	—	2–0	2–0	1–0	2–3	0–0	4–1	1–0
Murcia	3–0	2–1	1–0	2–0	2–2	3–1	2–0	6–1	1–1	3–1	3–1	1–2	2–1	—	5–0	0–0	2–0	0–2	1–0	2–0
Oviedo	5–1	1–0	1–0	3–1	1–1	2–0	0–1	3–0	1–0	3–0	2–1	1–0	1–2	1–1	—	2–1	1–1	0–0	1–0	2–1
Rayo	3–0	2–2	3–1	2–1	2–0	2–1	0–2	1–1	1–2	0–0	1–1	0–2	1–1	0–0	3–0	—	2–1	3–2	1–0	2–0
Recreativo	1–1	0–0	3–0	3–1	6–1	1–0	2–1	1–1	1–1	2–1	3–3	3–0	2–1	2–0	1–0	3–2	—	2–1	3–1	4–1
Sabadell	1–0	2–0	2–0	3–1	0–0	2–3	1–1	2–1	0–0	0–1	0–0	1–0	2–1	2–1	0–1	3–0	4–2	—	1–1	3–1
Sestao	2–0	2–0	1–0	2–0	0–0	0–1	1–0	2–0	3–1	1–0	3–0	3–0	0–0	1–4	0–2	4–1	1–1	2–0	—	3–1
Tenerife	3–1	1–1	2–2	0–0	2–0	3–0	0–1	1–1	0–2	1–2	0–0	3–1	2–2	1–3	1–1	0–0	3–0	2–2	2–1	—

Source: BDFutbol
Legend: Blue = home team win; Yellow = draw; Red = away team win.
