= Estadio Las Gaunas (1923) =

Former football stadium in Logroño, Spain

- Interactive map of Estadio Las Gaunas
- Full name: Estadio Las Gaunas
- Location: Logroño, Spain
- Owner: CD Logroñés
- Operator: CD Logroñés
- Capacity: 14,895

Construction
- Opened: 1923
- Closed: 2002

Tenant
- CD Logroñés

Estadio Las Gaunas was a multi-use stadium in Logroño, Spain. It was initially used as the stadium of CD Logroñés matches. It was replaced by the current Estadio Las Gaunas in 2002. The capacity of the stadium was 14,895 spectators.
