= Cartagena FC =

Association football club in Spain

- Full name: Cartagena Fútbol Club UCAM
- Nicknames: Efesé; La Cebra (The Zebras)
- Founded: 25 February 1940; 86 years ago as Unión Deportiva Cartagenera
- Ground: El Almarjal; Cartagena, Spain
- Capacity: 12,000
- Chairman: José Gómez Meseguer
- Manager: Juanjo Tomás
- 2021–22: 3ª RFEF – Group 13, 15th of 18
Home colours	Third colours

Cartagena Fútbol Club is a Spanish football team based in Cartagena, in the autonomous community of Murcia. They were formerly called UD Cartagenera. Founded in 1940, they are focused on youth football, and hold home games at Ciudad Deportiva Gómez Meseguer, with a capacity of 3,500 seats.

The club was a reserve team of FC Cartagena, during 2002–2009 and 2011–2014. In 2022, after suffering relegation from the Tercera División RFEF, the club closed their senior football department, only keeping their youth sides.

== History ==
In the 1983–84 season Cartagena was nearly relegated to Segunda División B. The club finished 16th, just one point more than Linares and Algeciras, which moved one division down.

=== Club names ===
- Unión Deportiva Cartagenera – (1940–61)
- Club Deportivo Cartagena – (1961–74)
- Cartagena Fútbol Club – (1974–)

== Honours ==
- Segunda División B
  - Champions (1): 1991–92
- Tercera División
  - Champions (1): 1979–80

== Season to season ==
- As an independent club

Season	Tier	Division	Place	Copa del Rey
1940–41	4	1ª Reg.	3rd	
1941–42	3	1ª Reg.	5th	
1942–43	3	1ª Reg.	10th	
1943–44	4	1ª Reg.	3rd	
1944–45	5	2ª Reg.		
1945–46	4	1ª Reg.	9th	
1946–47	4	1ª Reg.	2nd	
1947–48	5	2ª Reg.		
1948–49	4	1ª Reg.	6th	
1949–50	5	2ª Reg.		
1950–51	5	2ª Reg.		
1951–52	5	2ª Reg.		
1952–53	4	1ª Reg.	9th	
1953–54	3	3ª	16th	
1954–55	3	3ª	4th	
1955–56	3	3ª	2nd	
1956–57	3	3ª	4th	
1957–58	3	3ª	2nd	
1958–59	3	3ª	3rd	
1959–60	3	3ª	5th	

Season	Tier	Division	Place	Copa del Rey
1960–61	3	3ª	2nd	
1961–62	2	2ª	11th	
1962–63	2	2ª	13th	
1963–64	3	3ª	2nd	
1964–65	3	3ª	2nd	
1965–66	3	3ª	2nd	
1966–67	3	3ª	4th	
1967–68	3	3ª	3rd	
1968–69	3	3ª	2nd	
1969–70	3	3ª	4th	
1970–71	3	3ª	2nd	
1971–72	3	3ª	2nd	
1972–73	3	3ª	2nd	
1973–74	3	3ª	3rd	
1974–75	3	3ª	17th	
1975–76	4	Reg. Pref.	4th	
1976–77	4	Reg. Pref.	1st	
1977–78	4	3ª	2nd	
1978–79	4	3ª	5th	
1979–80	4	3ª	1st	

Season	Tier	Division	Place	Copa del Rey
1980–81	3	2ª B	5th	
1981–82	3	2ª B	2nd	
1982–83	2	2ª	16th	
1983–84	2	2ª	16th	
1984–85	2	2ª	8th	
1985–86	2	2ª	14th	
1986–87	2	2ª	16th	
1987–88	2	2ª	20th	
1988–89	3	2ª B	7th	

Season	Tier	Division	Place	Copa del Rey
1989–90	3	2ª B	11th	
1990–91	3	2ª B	2nd	
1991–92	3	2ª B	1st	
1992–93	3	2ª B	5th	
1993–94	3	2ª B	5th	
1994–95	3	2ª B	16th	
1995–96	4	3ª	2nd	
1996–97	4	3ª	(R)	
1997–2002	DNP			

- As a reserve team

Season	Tier	Division	Place
2002–03	6	1ª Reg.	13th
2003–04	6	1ª Reg.	4th
2004–05	5	Reg. Pref.	8th
2005–06	5	Reg. Pref.	7th
2006–07	5	Reg. Pref.	9th
2007–08	5	Reg. Pref.	11th
2008–09	5	Reg. Pref.	3rd

- As an independent club

Season	Tier	Division	Place	Copa del Rey
2009–10	4	3ª	13th	
2010–11	4	3ª	14th	

- As a reserve team

Season	Tier	Division	Place
2011–12	4	3ª	16th
2012–13	5	Pref. Aut.	3rd
2013–14	4	3ª	13th

- As an independent club

Season	Tier	Division	Place	Copa del Rey
2014–15	4	3ª	16th	
2015–16	5	Pref. Aut.	10th	
2016–17	5	Pref. Aut.	10th	
2017–18	5	Pref. Aut.	13th	
2018–19	5	Pref. Aut.	2nd	
2019–20	4	3ª	17th	
2020–21	4	3ª	5th / 2nd	
2021–22	5	3ª RFEF	15th	

- 8 seasons in Segunda División
- 9 seasons in Segunda División B
- 31 seasons in Tercera División
- 1 season in Tercera División RFEF
UD Cartagenera uniform

CD Cartagena logo

CD Cartagena uniform

== Selected former players ==
- (Andorra) Jesús Lucendo
- (Argentina) Juan Cantarutti
- (Argentina) Pedro Chazarreta
- (Argentina) Fernando Rodríguez Ferrer
- (Argentina) Armando Husillos
- (Argentina) Américo Brizzola
- (Chile) Fernando Santis
- (El Salvador) Norberto Huezo
- (Hungary) Sándor Kiss
- (Spain) Tatono
- (Spain) Alejandro Sagarduy
- (Spain) Fernando Arteaga
- (Spain) Francisco Valle
- (Spain) Martín Roales
- (Spain) José Luis Arjol
- (Spain) Alberto Vallina
- (Spain) Andrés Fernández
- (Spain) Manuel Requena
- (Spain) Pedro Cordero
- (Spain) Paco Sánchez
- (Spain) Cecilio Zunzunegui
- (Spain) José Parra Martínez
- (Spain) Quini
- (Spain) José Sigüenza
- (Spain) Carlos Llorens
- (Spain) José Zapatera
- (Spain) José Antonio Ramos
- (Spain) Asier Garitano
- (Spain) Fernando Marcos
- (Spain) César Gálvez
- (Spain) Mikel Roteta
- (Spain) Narciso Rodríguez
- (Spain) Enric Cuxart
- (Paraguay) Felipe Nery
- (Uruguay) José Carlos Trasante
- (Uruguay) Daniel Fernández
- (Uruguay) Roberto Álvarez
