= 1992–93 Cádiz CF season =

Cádiz CF
1992–93 season
- Chairman: Manuel Irigoyen
- Manager: José Luis Romero (until 17 January); Ramón Blanco (from 24 January)
- Stadium: Carranza
- La Liga: 19th (relegated)
- Copa del Rey: Fourth round
- Top goalscorer: League: Arteaga (5); All: Quino Cabrera (6)

The 1992–93 season was the 83rd season in Cádiz CF’s history.

== Squad ==
As of 14 March 2021

Note: Flags indicate national team as defined under FIFA eligibility rules; some limited exceptions apply. Players may hold more than one non-FIFA nationality.

No.	Pos.	Nation	Player
—	GK	ARG	Tubo Fernández
—	GK	ESP	Mayé
—	GK	CRO	Zoran Varvodić
—	GK	ESP	José Miguel Vega
—	DF	ESP	Francis Abascal
—	DF	ESP	Feliciano
—	DF	ESP	José Manuel Fernández
—	DF	ESP	Chico Linares
—	DF	ESP	José Antonio Mateos
—	DF	ESP	Carmelo Navarro (captain)
—	DF	ESP	Ángel Oliva
—	DF	ESP	Raúl Procopio
—	DF	CRO	Igor Štimac

No.	Pos.	Nation	Player
—	MF	ESP	Arteaga
—	MF	ESP	José Manuel Barla
—	MF	ESP	Bernardo
—	MF	ESP	Quino Cabrera
—	MF	ESP	Javi Germán
—	MF	CRO	Goran Milanko
—	MF	ESP	Poli
—	MF	ESP	Mami Quevedo
—	FW	ARG	Juan Crespín
—	FW	ESP	Fali
—	FW	ESP	Kiko
—	FW	ESP	Luina
—	FW	BRA	Macedo

=== Left club during season ===
Note: Flags indicate national team as defined under FIFA eligibility rules; some limited exceptions apply. Players may hold more than one non-FIFA nationality.

No.	Pos.	Nation	Player
—	FW	ESP	Francisco Aragón (on loan to Granada CF)

== Squad stats ==
Last updated on 14 March 2021.

No.	Pos	Nat	Player	Total		La Liga		Copa del Rey	
No.	Pos	Nat	Player	Apps	Goals	Apps	Goals	Apps	Goals
	GK	(Argentina) ARG	Tubo Fernández	26	0	23	0	3	0
	GK	(Spain) ESP	Mayé	0	0	0	0	0	0
	GK	(Croatia) CRO	Zoran Varvodić	16	0	15	0	1	0
	GK	(Spain) ESP	José Miguel Vega	0	0	0	0	0	0
	DF	(Spain) ESP	Francis Abascal	26	1	22+1	1	3	0
	DF	(Spain) ESP	Feliciano	14	0	10+1	0	3	0
	DF	(Spain) ESP	José Manuel Fernández	0	0	0	0	0	0
	DF	(Spain) ESP	Chico Linares	9	0	2+5	0	1+1	0
	DF	(Spain) ESP	José Antonio Mateos	27	0	25	0	2	0
	DF	(Spain) ESP	Carmelo Navarro	41	2	37	1	4	1
	DF	(Spain) ESP	Ángel Oliva	36	4	35	4	1	0
	DF	(Spain) ESP	Raúl Procopio	23	0	17+3	0	3	0
	DF	(Croatia) CRO	Igor Štimac	35	0	29+3	0	3	0
	MF	(Spain) ESP	Arteaga	35	5	33	5	2	0
	MF	(Spain) ESP	José Manuel Barla	41	2	37	2	3+1	0
	MF	(Spain) ESP	Bernardo	13	0	5+5	0	2+1	0
	MF	(Spain) ESP	Quino Cabrera	19	6	7+8	1	4	5
	MF	(Spain) ESP	Javi Germán	28	2	26+1	2	0+1	0
	MF	(Croatia) CRO	Goran Milanko	16	2	4+8	1	3+1	1
	MF	(Spain) ESP	Poli	2	0	0+2	0	0	0
	MF	(Spain) ESP	Mami Quevedo	32	3	30	3	2	0
	FW	(Argentina) ARG	Juan Crespín	7	0	6+1	0	0	0
	FW	(Spain) ESP	Fali	35	4	15+18	4	2	0
	FW	(Spain) ESP	Kiko	34	3	34	3	0	0
	FW	(Spain) ESP	Luina	1	0	0	0	0+1	0
	FW	(Brazil) BRA	Macedo	7	2	6+1	2	0	0
Players who have left the club after the start of the season:
	FW	(Spain) ESP	Francisco Aragón	6	0	0+3	0	2+1	0

== Competitions ==
=== Overall ===
Competition	Final position
La Liga	19th (relegated)
Copa del Rey	Fourth round

=== La Liga ===
Pos	Team	Pld	W	D	L	GF	GA	GD	Pts	Qualification or relegation
16	Oviedo	38	11	10	17	42	52	−10	32	
17	Albacete (O)	38	11	9	18	54	59	−5	31	Qualification for the relegation playoffs
18	Español (R)	38	9	11	18	40	56	−16	29	Qualification for the relegation playoffs
19	Cádiz (R)	38	5	12	21	30	70	−40	22 (Note: RBU 0–2 CÁD; CÁD 3–2 RBU)	Relegation to the Segunda División
20	Real Burgos (R)	38	4	14	20	29	69	−40	22	Relegation to the Segunda División

Source: LFP
Rules for classification: 1) points; 2) head-to-head points; 3) head-to-head goal difference; 4) head-to-head goals scored; 5) goal difference; 6) number of goals scored.
(O) Play-off winners; (R) Relegated

=== Copa del Rey ===
Win Draw Loss

Round	Opponent	Aggregate	Venue	First Leg	Venue	Second Leg
Third round	Polideportivo Ejido	6–0	A	3–0	H	3–0
Fourth round	Extremadura	1–6	A	1–5	H	0–1
