= José Manuel Barla =

Spanish football manager and retired player

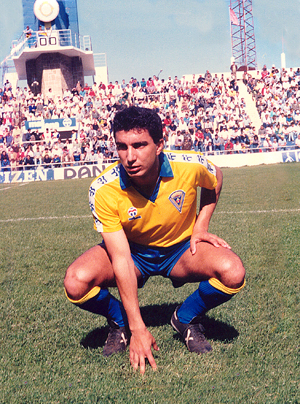

Personal information
- Full name: José Manuel Barla García
- Date of birth: 1 January 1967 (age 59)
- Place of birth: Cádiz, Spain
- Height: 1.76 m (5 ft 9 in)
- Position: Left midfielder

Youth career
- –1984: Cádiz

Senior career*
Years	Team	Apps	(Gls)
1984–1986	Cádiz B		
1984–1994	Cádiz	213	(5)
1994–1997	Rayo Vallecano	100	(9)
1997–2000	Cádiz	86	(3)
Total		399	(17)

Managerial career
- 2007–2008: Cádiz (assistant)
- 2015: Real Avilés
- 2016–2017: Real Jaén (assistant)
- 2017: Real Jaén
- * Club domestic league appearances and goals

José Manuel Barla García (born 1 January 1967) is a Spanish retired footballer who played as a left midfielder, and later worked as a manager.

== Playing career ==
Barla was born in Cádiz, capital of the province of the same name in the autonomous community of Andalusia, and began his career in the youth teams of Cádiz CF. He began playing for the B team, under the coaching of former defender David Vidal, in 1984, and was handed his first team debut in the Copa de la Liga Segunda División the following year. He continued to play predominantly for the reserves until the 1986–87 season, when first team manager Manolo Cardo gave him his La Liga debut in a 2–0 victory over Sporting de Gijón on 23 November. Cádiz found themselves in the relegation playoffs that season, and Barla played a crucial role in their survival. He scored the equaliser in their 1–1 away draw with Racing Santander at Estadio El Sardinero, which ultimately helped Cádiz stay in the top flight at Santander's expense.

Barla was not favoured by new coach Víctor Espárrago, who arrived before the following season, nor by Helmut Senekowitsch, who took over in 1988. It wasn't until Vidal, Barla's old coach in the B team, took over as first team coach ahead of the 1988–89 season, that the midfielder was able to reestablish himself in the side. His return was a spectacular one, as he provided assists for both goals in a 2–0 away victory over an Español side coached by Javier Clemente at Sarrià Stadium. The next few years were some of the best in Cádiz's history, as they consistently flirted with, but evaded, relegation under a succession of coaches, including Colin Addison, Héctor Veira and Ramón Blanco. Barla played alongside such talents as José González, Antonio Calderón, Raúl Procopio, Pepe Mejías, Mágico González, Carmelo Navarro and Ángel Oliva in a team considered to be one of the finest ever assembled at Cádiz.

During his time with Cádiz, Barla was part of some of the club's most famous moments. He played in the legendary 4–0 home victory over the Barcelona "Dream Team" coached by Johan Cruyff at Estadio Ramón de Carranza on 11 May 1991. At the end of that season, he helped Cádiz survive another relegation playoff as they beat Málaga on penalties.

In 1991–92, Cádiz found themselves in a relegation playoff yet again, and Barla helped them stay up for a third time in his career, securing a 3–1 victory over Figueres. They finally were relegated the following season, and unthinkably suffered a second consecutive relegation in 1993–94. Following this disappointment, the legendary Cádiz squad was dismantled, and Barla joined Segunda División side Rayo Vallecano. His move to Rayo marked his third link-up with coach David Vidal, and he was also playing alongside several former Cádiz teammates, including José González, Antonio Calderón and Onésimo Sánchez.

Paquito took over from Vidal as coach in late 1994, and Rayo earned promotion to the top flight in Barla's first season. They were involved in a relegation playoff the following year, and Barla helped them prevail over Real Mallorca. 1996–97 ended in a rematch, the fifth relegation playoff of Barla's career, but this team Mallorca prevailed, winning on away goals.

Following Rayo's relegation, Barla returned to Cádiz, with the goal of helping them escape Segunda División B. The club, once again under the coaching of Ramón Blanco, almost achieved this in the first season of Barla's return, as they qualified for the playoffs. However, they were drawn in a very tough group that included both Barcelona B and Real Madrid B, as well as Cultural Leonesa, with Barcelona securing the promotion spot. After two further unspectacular seasons, Barla retired in 2000 at the age of 33.

== Coaching career ==
Following his retirement, Barla became a qualified coach, and worked with the Cádiz youth teams. He was assistant coach of the first team during the 2007–08 Segunda División season, in which Cádiz were relegated, working initially under Mariano García Remón, and then former Cádiz teammates Antonio Calderón and Raúl Procopio. After that season, he became the club's sporting director. In April 2015, Ismael Díaz was fired after just four games in charge of Segunda División B side Real Avilés, and Barla was appointed as manager until the end of the season. He ultimately couldn't save them, and they were relegated to the Tercera División via the playoffs.

In January 2016, he was appointed assistant manager of another third tier side, Real Jaén, working under Gonzalo Arconada. He remained as assistant when Ramón Tejada replaced Arconada ahead of the 2016–17 season, and when Tejada resigned in March, Barla became manager until the end of the season. Similar to Avilés, Barla was unable to turn the season around, and Jaén were relegated that summer.

== Career statistics ==
=== As a player ===
As of 21 March 2021

Club	Season	League			Cup		Other		Total	
Club	Season	Division	Apps	Goals	Apps	Goals	Apps	Goals	Apps	Goals
Cádiz	1984–85	Segunda División	0	0	0	0	1	0	1	0
Cádiz	1985–96	La Liga	0	0	1	0	0	0	1	0
Cádiz	1986–87	La Liga	14	0	0	0	2	1	16	1
Cádiz	1987–88	La Liga	4	0	2	0	–		6	0
Cádiz	1988–89	La Liga	25	0	6	1	–		31	1
Cádiz	1989–90	La Liga	36	2	8	1	–		44	3
Cádiz	1990–91	La Liga	37	0	5	0	2	0	44	0
Cádiz	1991–92	La Liga	26	1	1	0	0	0	27	1
Cádiz	1992–93	La Liga	37	2	4	0	–		41	2
Cádiz	1993–94	Segunda División	34	0	3	0	–		37	0
Cádiz	Total		213	5	30	2	5	1	248	8
Rayo Vallecano	1994–95	Segunda División	35	7	6	1	–		41	8
Rayo Vallecano	1995–96	La Liga	37	2	2	1	2	0	41	3
Rayo Vallecano	1996–97	La Liga	28	0	5	0	0	0	33	0
Rayo Vallecano	Total		100	9	13	2	2	0	115	11
Cádiz	1997–98	Segunda División B	36	2	–		6	1	42	3
Cádiz	1998–99	Segunda División B	30	1	2	0	–		32	1
Cádiz	1999–2000	Segunda División B	20	0	1	0	–		21	0
Cádiz	Total		86	3	3	0	6	1	95	4
Cádiz total			299	8	33	2	11	2	343	12
Career total			399	17	46	4	13	2	458	23

1. Appearance in the 1985 Copa de la Liga Segunda División
2. Appearances in the 1986–87 La Liga relegation playoff
3. Appearances in the 1990–91 La Liga relegation playoff
4. Appearances in the 1995–96 La Liga relegation playoff
2. Appearances in the 1998 Segunda División playoffs

=== As a manager ===
As of 21 March 2021

Managerial record by team and tenure
Team	Nat	From	To	Record								Ref
Team	Nat	From	To	G	W	D	L	GF	GA	GD	Win %	Ref
Real Avilés	(Spain)	12 April 2015	31 May 2015	8	3	0	5	12	21	−9	37.50	
Real Jaén	(Spain)	19 March 2017	13 May 2017	9	2	2	5	9	11	−2	22.22	
Career Total				17	5	2	10	21	32	−11	29.41	—
