= 1990–91 Segunda División =

60th season of the second-tier football league in Spain

Segunda División
- Season: 1990–91
- Champions: Albacete Balompié
- Promoted: Albacete Balompié; Deportivo La Coruña
- Relegated: Orihuela Deportiva CF; Elche CF; UD Salamanca; Levante UD; Xerez CD
- Matches: 380
- Goals: 808 (2.13 per match)
- Top goalscorer: (Argentina) Juan Ramón Comas

The 1990–91 Segunda División season saw 20 teams participate in the second flight Spanish league. Albacete Balompié won the league.

Albacete and Deportivo de La Coruña were promoted to Primera División. Orihuela Deportiva, Elche CF, UD Salamanca, Levante UD and Xerez CD were relegated to Segunda División B.

== Teams ==
Location of teams in Segunda División 1990-91
Canary Islands

Team	Home city	Stadium
Albacete	Albacete	Carlos Belmonte
Real Avilés	Avilés	Juan Muro de Zaro
Bilbao Athletic	Bilbao	San Mamés
Celta de Vigo	Vigo	Balaídos
Deportivo La Coruña	A Coruña	Riazor
Eibar	Eibar	Ipurua
Elche	Elche	Manuel Martínez Valero
Figueres	Figueres	Vilatenim
Las Palmas	Las Palmas	Insular
Levante	Valencia	Nou Estadi
Lleida	Lleida	Camp d'Esports
Málaga	Málaga	La Rosaleda
Murcia	Murcia	La Condomina
Orihuela	Orihuela	Los Arcos
Palamós	Palamós	Nou Municipal
Rayo Vallecano	Madrid	Vallecas
Sabadell	Sabadell	Nova Creu Alta
Salamanca	Villares de la Reina	Helmántico
Sestao Sport	Sestao	Las Llanas
Xerez	Jerez de la Frontera	Chapín

== Final table ==
Pos	Team	Pld	W	D	L	GF	GA	GD	Pts	Promotion or relegation
1	Albacete Bp.	38	18	13	7	56	31	+25	49	Promoted to Primera División
2	Deportivo de La Coruña	38	20	8	10	60	32	+28	48	Promoted to Primera División
3	Real Murcia	38	18	12	8	56	36	+20	48	Promotion playoff
4	CD Málaga	38	16	14	8	52	35	+17	46	Promotion playoff
5	Orihuela Deportiva (Note: Orihuela Deportiva was relegated to Segunda División B for not paying its players and replaced by Barcelona Atlètic.)	38	12	19	7	46	39	+7	43	
6	UE Lleida	38	16	11	11	41	36	+5	43	
7	UE Figueres	38	14	11	13	44	42	+2	39	
8	Sestao	38	9	20	9	29	27	+2	38	
9	Real Avilés	38	10	18	10	35	37	−2	38	
10	SD Eibar	38	9	19	10	35	34	+1	37	
11	Rayo Vallecano	38	8	20	10	44	50	−6	36	
12	CE Sabadell FC	38	11	14	13	32	45	−13	36	
13	Bilbao Athletic	38	11	14	13	35	43	−8	36	
14	Celta de Vigo	38	8	20	10	31	38	−7	36	
15	UD Las Palmas	38	10	16	12	38	43	−5	36	
16	Palamós CF	38	9	17	12	33	46	−13	35	
17	Elche CF	38	12	10	16	39	45	−6	34	Relegated to Segunda División B
18	UD Salamanca	38	9	13	16	41	40	+1	31	Relegated to Segunda División B
19	Levante UD	38	6	15	17	27	51	−24	27	Relegated to Segunda División B
20	Xerez CD	38	6	12	20	37	61	−24	24	Relegated to Segunda División B

Source: BDFutbol

== Results ==
Home \ Away	ALB	ATH	AVI	CEL	DEP	EIB	ELC	FIG	LPA	LEV	LLE	MGA	MUR	ORI	PAL	RAY	SAB	SAL	SES	XER
Albacete	—	1–1	0–0	2–0	2–1	3–1	2–1	5–1	4–1	3–1	2–0	2–2	2–2	0–0	2–0	1–1	0–0	2–0	0–0	0–0
Athletic B	2–0	—	2–0	1–1	3–1	1–1	3–0	2–0	2–1	0–1	1–0	1–2	2–1	1–1	2–0	1–1	1–0	1–1	0–2	0–0
Real Avilés	1–2	0–0	—	0–0	1–1	2–1	3–2	0–0	2–0	1–1	1–0	3–3	0–0	1–1	3–3	1–1	1–0	1–1	1–1	5–0
Celta	0–2	1–1	0–0	—	0–0	2–1	1–1	2–0	1–0	2–1	1–1	0–0	0–2	2–0	1–2	2–2	0–0	1–0	1–1	1–0
Deportivo	2–1	2–1	1–0	3–0	—	2–3	2–0	2–1	0–0	5–0	5–0	1–0	2–0	1–0	3–0	3–0	4–2	2–1	1–0	2–0
Eibar	0–3	0–1	0–0	0–0	2–2	—	1–1	0–0	2–2	3–1	3–0	1–0	1–0	1–1	1–0	1–1	3–0	2–0	0–1	1–1
Elche	2–0	6–0	2–0	0–1	0–0	0–0	—	2–1	0–0	0–0	0–0	0–1	3–2	0–1	1–4	1–3	2–0	0–0	1–1	1–0
Figueres	3–1	5–1	0–2	1–0	1–0	1–1	0–1	—	1–1	2–1	0–2	0–1	2–1	1–1	0–0	2–0	3–0	3–2	2–0	3–1
Las Palmas	0–1	1–1	2–0	1–1	2–1	1–0	0–1	0–2	—	1–0	2–0	3–0	2–0	0–0	1–1	2–2	0–0	2–0	0–1	3–1
Levante	0–2	1–1	0–0	1–1	0–2	0–0	3–1	0–1	2–3	—	2–0	1–3	1–1	0–0	0–0	0–0	0–0	1–0	1–0	2–3
Lleida	1–0	1–0	3–0	2–1	2–1	2–0	2–0	1–1	1–1	2–1	—	2–0	1–1	2–2	0–0	1–0	0–1	1–0	1–1	3–1
Málaga	3–2	1–0	1–0	1–1	1–2	0–0	2–0	0–0	1–1	4–1	0–1	—	1–1	2–2	5–0	1–0	4–2	1–0	1–0	3–0
Murcia	2–0	1–0	1–1	1–1	3–2	1–0	2–1	3–0	2–1	2–0	1–0	1–1	—	3–0	1–1	6–1	4–0	2–1	3–1	0–0
Orihuela	0–0	3–1	4–0	1–1	0–0	1–0	3–0	1–1	2–2	3–0	1–0	1–1	1–2	—	1–0	2–4	1–1	2–0	1–0	3–2
Palamós	1–1	0–0	0–1	3–2	1–1	1–1	1–0	3–2	2–0	0–0	1–0	0–0	0–1	4–1	—	1–1	0–0	0–3	1–1	3–2
Rayo	1–1	0–0	0–2	2–1	0–3	0–0	1–2	1–1	4–0	2–2	1–4	1–1	2–0	0–0	0–0	—	0–0	2–0	2–0	1–0
Sabadell	0–4	2–0	1–0	3–0	1–0	1–2	0–2	2–1	0–0	1–1	2–3	1–0	1–2	1–1	0–0	2–2	—	1–0	1–1	3–2
Salamanca	0–1	3–0	0–0	1–1	1–0	2–2	2–2	2–0	4–1	0–0	1–1	1–1	3–0	0–2	4–0	2–2	0–1	—	1–0	3–0
Sestao Sport	0–0	1–1	2–0	0–0	0–0	0–0	2–1	0–0	1–1	0–1	1–1	2–0	0–0	1–1	1–0	2–1	0–0	1–1	—	4–1
Xerez	1–2	1–0	1–2	1–1	3–0	0–0	1–2	0–2	0–0	2–0	0–0	1–4	1–1	4–1	3–0	1–2	1–2	1–1	0–0	—

Source: BDFutbol
Legend: Blue = home team win; Yellow = draw; Red = away team win.

== Promotion playoff ==
Team 1	Agg.	Team 2	1st leg	2nd leg
Real Murcia	2–5	Real Zaragoza	0–0	2–5
CD Málaga	1–1 (4-5 (p.))	Cádiz CF	1–0	0–1

=== First leg ===
12 June 1991	Real Murcia	0–0	Real Zaragoza	Murcia
21:30		Report (in Spanish)		Stadium: La Condomina; Attendance: 16,500; Referee: Manuel Díaz Vega (Asturias)

12 June 1991	CD Málaga	1–0	Cádiz CF	Málaga
21:30	Esteban 61'	Report (in Spanish)		Stadium: La Rosaleda; Attendance: 30,000; Referee: Joaquín Ramos Marcos (Castile and León)

=== Second leg ===
19 June 1991	Real Zaragoza	5–2 (5–2 agg.)	Real Murcia	Zaragoza
21:30	Poyet 8', 31'; Pardeza 41', 86'; Higuera 78'	Report (in Spanish)	Eraña 40'; Juanito 84'	Stadium: La Romareda; Attendance: 34,000; Referee: Antonio Martín Navarrete (Andalusia)

19 June 1991	Cádiz CF	1–0 (a.e.t.) (1–1 agg.) (5-4 p)	CD Málaga	Cádiz
21:30	José 57'	Report (in Spanish)		Stadium: Ramón de Carranza; Attendance: 20,000; Referee: Ildefonso Urizar Azpitarte (Basque Country (autonomous community))
	Penalties
	Oliva (penalty scored); Raúl (penalty missed); Poli (penalty scored); José (penalty scored); Carmelo (penalty scored); Juan José (penalty scored)		(penalty scored) Quino; (penalty scored) Txirri; (penalty scored) Esteban; (penalty scored) Álvarez; (penalty missed) Antonio Mata; (penalty missed) Emilio
