= Francis Abascal =

Spanish former footballer

Personal information
- Full name: Francisco José Abascal Alonso
- Date of birth: 10 October 1966 (age 60)
- Place of birth: Noriega, Spain
- Height: 1.91 m (6 ft 3 in)
- Position: Centre back

Senior career*
Years	Team	Apps	(Gls)
1984–1988	Real Oviedo Aficionados		
1988–1991	Real Burgos	52	(4)
1991–1994	Cádiz	66	(1)
1994–1995	San Fernando	30	(0)
1995–1997	Langreo	69	(1)
1997–2000	Ponferradina	28	(0)
Total		245	(6)

Managerial career
- 2009–2010: Balón de Cádiz
- 2010–2011: Domingo Savio Juvenil
- 2015–2016: Conil CF
- * Club domestic league appearances and goals as of 13 March 2021

Francisco José Abascal Alonso (born 10 October 1966), known as Francis Abascal, is a Spanish former professional footballer who played as a centre back.

== Career ==
Abascal was born in Noriega in Ribadedeva, within the province and autonomous community of Asturias, and began his career with Asturian side Real Oviedo. He first appeared for the B team, Real Oviedo Aficionados, in 1984, and helped them to promotion as Tercera División group winners in 1987–88. However, he never played for the first team, and moved on in 1988 to join Real Burgos. He won the Segunda División title with Burgos in 1989–90, but played just once in the ensuing top flight campaign. He left the club in 1991 after 59 appearances and five goals in all competitions, joining La Liga rivals Cádiz.

In Abascal's first season, Cádiz avoided relegation thanks to a playoff victory over Figueres, but they were not so lucky in 1992–93. The following year they suffered a second consecutive relegation, and Abascal departed with two goals in his 75 matches for the club in all competitions. His next destination was San Fernando, where he made 33 appearances in 1994–95, but couldn't prevent them being relegated from Segunda División B. He spent the next two seasons with Langreo in the third tier, scoring once in 69 matches.

Abascal signed for Tercera División side Ponferradina in 1997. He helped them to promotion in 1998–99, and made 29 appearances in the Segunda División B season that followed. He retired in 2000 at the age of 33.

== Honours ==
Real Oviedo Aficionados

- Tercera División: 1987–88

Real Burgos

- Segunda División: 1989–90

== Career statistics ==
As of 15 March 2021

Club	Season	League			Cup		Other		Total	
Club	Season	Division	Apps	Goals	Apps	Goals	Apps	Goals	Apps	Goals
Real Burgos	1988–89	Segunda División	24	1	5	1	–		29	2
Real Burgos	1989–90	Segunda División	27	3	2	0	–		29	3
Real Burgos	1990–91	La Liga	1	0	0	0	–		1	0
Real Burgos	Total		52	4	7	1	0	0	59	5
Cádiz	1991–92	La Liga	29	0	2	1	2	0	33	1
Cádiz	1992–93	La Liga	23	1	3	0	–		26	1
Cádiz	1993–94	Segunda División	14	0	2	0	–		16	0
Cádiz	Total		66	1	7	1	2	0	75	2
San Fernando	1994–95	Segunda División B	30	0	3	0	–		33	0
Langreo	1995–96	Segunda División B	33	0	–		–		33	0
Langreo	1996–97	Segunda División B	36	1	–		–		36	1
Langreo	Total		69	1	0	0	0	0	69	1
Ponferradina	1999–2000	Segunda División B	28	0	1	0	–		29	0
Career total			245	6	18	2	2	0	265	8

1. Appearances in the 1991–92 La Liga relegation playoff
