= José Antonio Mateos =

Spanish retired footballer

Personal information
- Full name: José Antonio Mateos García
- Date of birth: 27 February 1971 (age 55)
- Place of birth: San Fernando, Spain
- Height: 1.74 m (5 ft 8 1/2 in)
- Position: Left back

Senior career*
Years	Team	Apps	(Gls)
1990–1991	Cádiz B		
1991–1998	Cádiz	179	(1)
1998–1999	Algeciras CF	29	(0)
1999–2001	San Fernando	34	(1)
2001–2002	Benidorm	26	(0)
2002–2003	Motril	11	(0)
2003–2004	Jerez Industrial CF		
2004–2005	Chiclana CF		
Total		279	(2)
- * Club domestic league appearances and goals

José Antonio Mateos García (born 27 February 1971) is a Spanish retired footballer who played as a left back.

== Career ==
Mateos was born in San Fernando in the province of Cádiz, and began his career with Cádiz CF. He played with the B team during the 1990–91 season, helping them win their Tercera División group. He was promoted to the first team the following year, and helped them avoid La Liga relegation by winning a playoff against Figueres.

Cádiz actually were relegated in 1992–93, and found themselves in Segunda División B after a second successive relegation the following year. Mateos stayed with the club until 1998, when he joined group rivals Algeciras CF. Algeciras suffered relegation via the play-offs in his only season, and he signed for Tercera División side San Fernando, based in his hometown, in 1999. San Fernando were promoted in his first season, and avoided relegation in 2000–01. Mateos was not to be so lucky over the next two seasons, enduring Segunda División B relegation with Benidorm in 2001–02 and Motril in 2002–03.

Mateos saw out his career in the Tercera División, spending one season each with Jerez Industrial CF and Chiclana CF, before retiring in 2005 at the age of 34.

== Honours ==
Cádiz B

- Tercera División: 1990–91

== Career statistics ==
As of 15 March 2021

Club	Season	League			Cup		Other		Total	
Club	Season	Division	Apps	Goals	Apps	Goals	Apps	Goals	Apps	Goals
Cádiz	1991–92	La Liga	34	0	0	0	2	0	36	0
Cádiz	1992–93	La Liga	25	0	2	0	–		27	0
Cádiz	1993–94	Segunda División	12	0	3	0	–		15	0
Cádiz	1994–95	Segunda División B	28	0	2	0	–		30	0
Cádiz	1995–96	Segunda División B	30	1	–		–		30	1
Cádiz	1996–97	Segunda División B	30	0	–		–		30	0
Cádiz	1997–98	Segunda División B	20	0	–		4	0	24	0
Cádiz	Total		179	1	7	0	6	0	192	1
Algeciras CF	1998–99	Segunda División B	29	0	2	0	3	0	34	0
San Fernando	2000–01	Segunda División B	34	1	–		–		34	1
Benidorm	2001–02	Segunda División B	26	0	–		–		26	0
Motril	2002–03	Segunda División B	11	0	1	0	–		12	0
Career total			279	2	10	0	9	0	298	2

1. Appearances in the 1991–92 La Liga relegation playoff
2. Appearances in the 1998 Segunda División B play-offs
3. Appearances in the 1999 Segunda División B relegation play-offs
