= Javier Germán =

Spanish retired footballer

Javi Germán
Personal information
- Full name: Javier Germán Cruz
- Date of birth: 15 June 1971 (age 55)
- Place of birth: Cádiz, Spain
- Height: 1.72 m (5 ft 8 in)
- Position: Midfielder

Senior career*
Years	Team	Apps	(Gls)
1990–1999	Cádiz	210	(7)
2000	Ponferradina	18	(3)
2000–2001	Motril	36	(1)
2001–2002	Benidorm	17	(1)
Total		281	(12)
- * Club domestic league appearances and goals

Javier Germán Cruz (born 15 June 1971), known as Javi Germán, is a Spanish retired footballer who played as a midfielder. He spent the majority of his career with his hometown club Cádiz, making 226 appearances and scoring seven goals, including two goals in 38 La Liga matches.

== Career ==
Germán was born in Cádiz, capital of the province of the same name in the autonomous community in Andalusia, and began his career with Cádiz CF. He made his La Liga debut on 2 March 1991, as Cádiz hosted Real Madrid at Estadio Ramón de Carranza. He replaced Poli for the last minute of the game as Cádiz held on for an excellent 1–0 victory. This was his only minute of football that season, but he played a bigger part in 1991–92, and helped keep Cádiz in the top flight as they beat Figueres in the relegation playoff.

The following year, Cádiz actually were relegated, and they suffered a second consecutive demotion in 1993–94. Germán stayed with the club in Segunda División B for another five and a half seasons, ultimately making over 200 appearances. The best season in this period for both player and club was 1997–98, in which they had a chance to be promoted via the playoffs, missing out to Barcelona B. He left the club in January 2000, joining fellow third tier side Ponferradina. He spent only half a season with Ponferradina before seeing out his career with one year each at Segunda División B sides Motril and Benidorm. He was relegated with Benidorm in 2001–02, and retired at the end of that season as he reached his 31st birthday.

== Career statistics ==
As of 19 March 2021

Club	Season	League			Cup		Other		Total	
Club	Season	Division	Apps	Goals	Apps	Goals	Apps	Goals	Apps	Goals
Cádiz	1990–91	La Liga	1	0	0	0	0	0	1	0
Cádiz	1991–92	La Liga	10	0	1	0	2	0	13	0
Cádiz	1992–93	La Liga	27	2	1	0	–		28	2
Cádiz	1993–94	Segunda División	19	0	0	0	–		19	0
Cádiz	1994–95	Segunda División B	29	0	4	0	–		33	0
Cádiz	1995–96	Segunda División B	28	1	–		–		28	1
Cádiz	1996–97	Segunda División B	26	2	–		–		26	2
Cádiz	1997–98	Segunda División B	31	1	–		5	0	36	1
Cádiz	1998–99	Segunda División B	29	1	2	0	–		31	1
Cádiz	1999–2000	Segunda División B	10	0	1	0	–		11	0
Cádiz	Total		210	7	9	0	7	0	226	7
Ponferradina	1999–2000	Segunda División B	18	3	0	0	–		18	3
Motril	2000–01	Segunda División B	36	1	–		–		36	1
Benidorm	2001–02	Segunda División B	17	1	–		–		17	1
Career total			281	12	9	0	7	0	297	12

1. Appearances in the 1991–92 La Liga relegation playoff
2. Appearances in the 1998 Segunda División playoffs
