= Abascal =

Abascal is a Spanish surname, derived from the village of Abascal de Lemos in the municipality of Arredondo in Cantabria, Spain. The name of the village, in turn, has Basque roots and is composed of two words meaning "priest" (abas) and "street" (kale). Notable people with the surname include:

- Adriana Abascal (born 1970), Mexican model
- Alejandro Abascal (born 1952), Spanish sailor
- Amelia Abascal (1923-?), Mexican painter, sculptor and ceramist
- Carlos Abascal (1949–2008), Mexican politician
- Francis Abascal (born 1966), Spanish footballer
- Gonzalo Abascal (born 1990), Chilean footballer
- Graciela Abascal (1939–2020), Mexican artist
- Guille Abascal (born 1989), Spanish footballer and manager
- José Fernando de Abascal y Sousa (1743–1821), Spanish viceroy of Peru
- José Manuel Abascal (born 1958), Spanish runner
- Mar Abascal (born 1980), Spanish actress
- Marco Abascal (born 1960), Chilean footballer
- Naty Abascal (born 1943), Spanish model
- Ricardo Gutiérrez Abascal (1888–1963), Spanish art critic
- Rodrigo Abascal (born 1994), Uruguayan footballer
- Salvador Abascal (1910–2000), Mexican politician
- Santiago Abascal (born 1976), Spanish sociologist and politician
- Santiago Abascal Escuza (1949–2017), Spanish politician, father of the above
- Silvia Abascal (born 1979), Spanish actress
