= Ramón Blanco (footballer) =

Spanish footballer and manager

Personal information
- Full name: Ramón Blanco Rodríguez
- Date of birth: 20 February 1952
- Place of birth: Vimianzo, Spain
- Date of death: 9 May 2013 (aged 61)
- Place of death: Cádiz, Spain
- Height: 1.73 m (5 ft 8 in)
- Position: Defensive midfielder

Youth career
- 1965–1969: Sportivo Italiano

Senior career*
Years	Team	Apps	(Gls)
1969–1971	Sportivo Italiano		
1972–1974	Mallorca	34	(0)
1974–1976	Betis	14	(0)
1976–1980	Cádiz	98	(16)
1980–1981	Recreativo	21	(0)
1981–1984	Portuense	87	(7)
1984–1985	Chiclana		
1985–1986	Sanluqueño		
1986–1987	CD Moguer		
Total		254	(23)

Managerial career
- 1990: Cádiz
- 1991–1992: Cádiz
- 1993: Cádiz
- 1993–1995: Marbella
- 1996–1998: Cádiz
- 1998–1999: Almería
- 1999–2000: San Fernando
- 2001–2002: Granada
- 2002–2003: Torredonjimeno
- 2003–2004: San Fernando
- 2012: Cádiz
- * Club domestic league appearances and goals

Ramón Blanco Rodríguez (20 February 1952 – 9 May 2013) was a Spanish football defensive midfielder and manager.

His professional career was closely associated to Cádiz, as both a player and manager.

== Playing career ==
Born in Vimianzo, Province of A Coruña, Blanco moved to Argentina at an early age, as his parents were in search of better working opportunities. He joined Sportivo Italiano at the age of 13, making his senior debut with the first team in Primera B Nacional only four years later.

Again in his country of birth, Blanco signed for RCD Mallorca in Segunda División, moving to La Liga with Real Betis in 1974. He saw out his two-year contract with the latter, in spite of limited playing opportunities. He made his debut in the Spanish top flight on 5 January 1975, coming on as a late substitute in a 3–0 home win against Hércules CF.

Blanco joined Andalusia neighbours Cádiz CF in summer 1976, achieving promotion in his first year and being part of the squad that reached the top division for the first time ever. Under manager Enrique Mateos, other than in his natural position, he played also as a right winger and a centre forward.

On 29 January 1978, Blanco scored his first and only goal in the top tier, in a 1–2 home loss to Valencia CF. The season ended in immediate relegation and, after a further two years with the club in division two, he left after a contract dispute to Recreativo de Huelva.

Blanco retired in 1987 at the age of 35, after several spells in lower league and amateur football, mainly with Racing Club Portuense as he wanted to remain close to Cádiz.

== Coaching career ==
Blanco started working as a coach immediately after retiring, beginning with Cádiz's youth teams and occasionally aiding first-team manager Víctor Espárrago. After being in charge of the reserves and also assisting several coaches, he was appointed at the helm of the main squad late into the 1990–91 campaign, and managed to save the side from top-flight relegation in the playoffs, with a penalty shootout win over CD Málaga. The feat was repeated again the following year, after disposing of UE Figueres 3–1 on aggregate.

After the Gaditanos eventually suffered relegation in 1993, Blanco left and signed with CA Marbella of the second division, being sacked early into the 1995–96 season. He returned to Cádiz the following campaign, with the team now in Segunda División B. He left in June 1998 after not being able to help them promote, going on to work in the same league with UD Almería, CD San Fernando (two spells), Granada CF and Torredonjimeno CF.

After an extended period away from football, and also working as a sports commentator, Blanco returned to his beloved Cádiz 14 years later, with the club still in the third tier. He left after only three games in charge, however, for medical reasons.

== Death ==
Blanco died on 9 May 2013 in Cádiz at the age of 61, after not being able to overcome a stroke.
