= Arteaga (footballer, born 1969) =

Spanish footballer and manager

Personal information
- Full name: Moisés García Fernández
- Date of birth: 1 June 1969 (age 57)
- Place of birth: Cádiz, Spain
- Height: 1.84 m (6 ft 0 in)
- Position: Midfielder

Youth career
- Cádiz

Senior career*
| Years | Team | Apps | (Gls) |
| 1988–1991 | Cádiz B | 94 | (17) |
| 1989–1993 | Cádiz | 69 | (8) |
| 1993–2003 | Espanyol | 266 | (30) |
| 2001–2002 | → Rayo Vallecano (loan) | 23 | (3) |
| 2003–2007 | Chiclana | 60 | (8) |
| Total | | 512 | (66) |

Managerial career
- 2011–2012: Badajoz (assistant)
- 2012: Badajoz
- 2022–2023: Europa
- * Club domestic league appearances and goals

Moisés García Fernández (born 1 June 1969), known as Arteaga, is a Spanish former professional footballer who played as a left midfielder.

== Playing career ==
Born in Cádiz, Arteaga made his professional debut with hometown club Cádiz CF, becoming firmly established as a first-team member in 1991–92. In the following season, the Andalusians were relegated from La Liga and he also moved down a division to play for RCD Espanyol.

In his first two seasons with the Catalans, Arteaga was instrumental in helping them return to the top flight and immediately finish sixth the following campaign, totalling ten goals in 66 games. He continued appearing regularly for the side until 2000–01, winning the Copa del Rey in 2000.

After a year on loan at Rayo Vallecano, Arteaga returned to Espanyol, retiring from professional football at the end of the 2002–03 season with top-division totals of 330 matches and 37 goals. Until 2007, he played for amateurs Chiclana CF in his native region.

== Coaching career ==
Arteaga started working as a manager with CD Badajoz, first as assistant. In late December 2011, he replaced Víctor Torres Mestre at the helm of the Segunda División B club.

On 29 March 2022, Artega was appointed at Europa in the Gibraltar National League.

== Personal life ==
Arteaga was born in the same place and on the same day as fellow Cádiz youth graduate José María Quevedo. He earned his nickname because of his father, Manuel García Arteaga (1935–2023), who also played for the club.

== Honours ==
Espanyol

- Copa del Rey: 1999–2000
- Segunda División: 1993–94
