= Tubo Fernández =

Argentinian association football player

Personal information
- Full name: Jorge Luis Fernández Pérez
- Date of birth: 8 March 1959 (age 67)
- Place of birth: Buenos Aires, Argentina
- Height: 1.86 m (6 ft 1 in)
- Position: Goalkeeper

Senior career*
| Years | Team | Apps | (Gls) |
| 1978–1983 | Deportivo Español | | |
| 1984–1989 | Vélez Sarsfield | 5 | (0) |
| 1986–1987 | → Club Cipolletti (loan) | | |
| 1987–1988 | → Ferro Carril Oeste (loan) | 0 | (0) |
| 1989 | Banfield | | |
| 1989–1990 | Albacete Balompié | | |
| 1990–1991 | Real Murcia | 38 | (0) |
| 1991–1992 | Lleida | 38 | (5) |
| 1992–1994 | Cádiz | 32 | (0) |
| 1994–1995 | Águilas | | |
| 1995–1996 | Cartagonova | 27 | (0) |
| 1996–1997 | Olímpico de Totana | | |
| Total | | 140 | (5) |

International career
| 1979 | Argentina Under-20 | | |

Managerial career
- 1998–2001: Albacete Balompié (goalkeeping coach)
- 2001–2003: Ciudad de Murcia (goalkeeping coach)
- 2003–2006: Real Murcia (goalkeeping coach)
- 2009: Atlético Ciudad (goalkeeping coach)
- * Club domestic league appearances and goals

Jorge Luis Fernández Pérez (born 8 March 1959), known as Tubo Fernández, is an Argentine retired footballer who played as a goalkeeper, and later worked as a coach. He played in the Argentine Primera División for Vélez Sarsfield and Ferro Carril Oeste, before moving to Spain in 1989. He played for a number of Spanish clubs, including making 23 La Liga appearances for Cádiz during the 1992–93 season.

== Club career ==
Fernández was born in the Argentine capital Buenos Aires, and began his career with local side Deportivo Español in 1978. Español won the Primera C Metropolitana title in 1979, and Fernández stayed until joining Primera División side Vélez Sarsfield, under legendary coach Alfio Basile, in 1984. He also had loan spells with Club Cipolletti and Ferro Carril Oeste before signing for Banfield in 1989.

Later in 1989, Fernández made the move to Spain, joining Albacete Balompié. He helped Albacete win their 1989–90 Segunda División B group, before moving on to join Real Murcia in 1990. Murcia qualified for the Segunda División promotion playoff in his first season, but were defeated 5–2 on aggregate by Real Zaragoza. Fernández signed for second tier rivals Lleida in 1991, playing every game during his only season with the club. Unusually for a goalkeeper, he took penalties during his time at Lleida, and scored from the spot five times, including a brace in a 4–1 home win over Athletic Bilbao B at Camp d'Esports on 19 April 1992.

That summer, he took the step up to La Liga with newly promoted Cádiz, and was first choice for most of the season as they suffered immediate relegation. He lost his starting place to Yosu during 1993–94, as Cádiz endured a second consecutive relegation. Fernández had an agreement in place to join Badajoz that summer, but the deal fell through as he was contracted hepatitis. Instead, finished off his career in the fourth and fifth tiers with one season each at Águilas, Cartagonova and Olímpico de Totana. He retired in 1997 at the age of 38.

== International career ==
During 1979, Fernández played for the Argentine national under-20 team, coming under the management of 1978 FIFA World Cup winning head coach César Luis Menotti. He was teammates with many future stars of the national team, including Ramón Díaz and Juan Simón.

== Coaching career ==
After his retirement, Fernández worked as a goalkeeping coach in Spain. He returned to his first Spanish club, Albacete Balompié, in 1998, and was their goalkeeping coach until 2001, when he moved to Ciudad de Murcia. After two seasons with Ciudad, he joined Real Murcia as goalkeeping coach, staying until 2006. He made a brief return to coaching in 2009 with Atlético Ciudad, which had replaced Ciudad de Murcia after the latter's relocation to Granada in 2007.

== Honours ==
Deportivo Español

- Primera C Metropolitana: 1979

Albacete Balompié

- Segunda División B: 1989–90

UE Lleida

- Copa Catalunya runners-up: 1991–92

Águilas

- Tercera División runners-up: 1994–95

Cartagonova

- Preferente Autonómica de la Región de Murcia runners-up: 1995–96

== Career statistics ==
As of 15 March 2021

| Club | Season | League | | | Cup | | Other | | Total | |
| Club | Season | Division | Apps | Goals | Apps | Goals | Apps | Goals | Apps | Goals |
Argentina
| Ferro Carril Oeste | 1987–88 | Primera División | 0 | 0 | – | | – | | 0 | 0 |
| Vélez Sarsfield | 1988–89 | Primera División | 5 | 0 | – | | – | | 5 | 0 |
Spain
| Real Murcia | 1990–91 | Segunda División | 38 | 0 | 6 | 0 | 2 | 0 | 46 | 0 |
| Lleida | 1991–92 | Segunda División | 38 | 5 | 0 | 0 | – | | 38 | 5 |
| Cádiz | 1992–93 | La Liga | 23 | 0 | 3 | 0 | – | | 26 | 0 |
| Cádiz | 1993–94 | Segunda División | 9 | 0 | 2 | 0 | – | | 11 | 0 |
| Cádiz | Total | | 32 | 0 | 5 | 0 | 0 | 0 | 37 | 0 |
| Cartagonova | 1995–96 | Preferente Autonómica | 27 | 0 | – | | – | | 27 | 0 |
| Career total | | | 140 | 5 | 11 | 0 | 2 | 0 | 153 | 5 |

1. Appearances in the 1990–91 Segunda División promotion playoff
