= Carmelo Navarro =

Spanish footballer

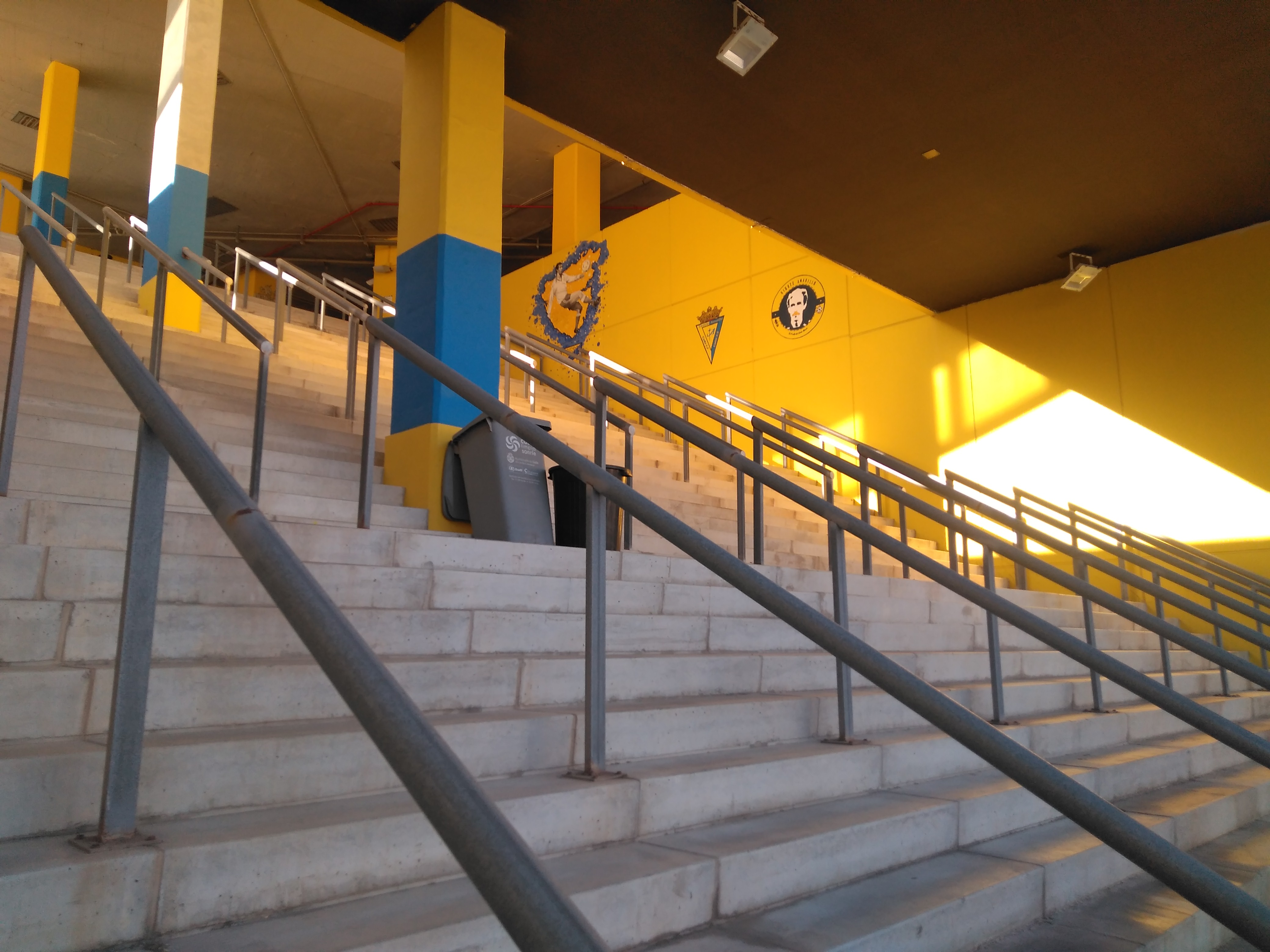
- The tribute to Carmelo at Cádiz's Ramón de Carranza ground

Personal information
- Full name: Carmelo José Navarro Careaga
- Date of birth: 25 March 1959 (age 67)
- Place of birth: Murcia, Spain
- Height: 1.82 m (6 ft 0 in)
- Position: Centre back

Youth career
- Ural
- –1977: Safa San Luis

Senior career*
Years	Team	Apps	(Gls)
1977–1979	Racing Portuense	63	(10)
1979–1981	Salamanca	11	(0)
1981–1986	Real Betis	44	(1)
1983–1984	→ Recreativo de Huelva	38	(2)
1985–1986	→ Recreativo de Huelva	6	(1)
1986–1987	Recreativo de Huelva	26	(1)
1987–1994	Cádiz	240	(2)
Total		428	(17)
- * Club domestic league appearances and goals as of 18 March 2021

Carmelo José Navarro Careaga (born 25 March 1959) is a Spanish former professional footballer who played as a centre back.

== Playing career ==
Navarro was born in Murcia, capital of the autonomous community of the Region of Murcia, but his family moved twice in his early years, first to A Coruña in Galica, and then to El Puerto de Santa María in the province of Cádiz, Andalusia. He played for the Ural youth team in A Coruña, and joined Safa San Luis when relocating to El Puerto. He was noticed by scouts of El Puerto-based Racing Portuense, and joined the Segunda División B side in 1977, aged just 18.

Navarro spent two seasons with Portuense, making 66 appearances in all competitions, and scoring ten goals. This earned him a move to La Liga side Salamanca in 1979, where he scored twice in 24 matches over the next two seasons. Salamanca were relegated at the end of the 1980–81 season, in which Navarro's appearances were limited due to serving his military service in Cartagena, Ferrol and Madrid. He moved on again that summer, joining Real Betis. Betis finished an excellent sixth in his first season, and therefore qualified for the 1982–83 UEFA Cup. Navarro made his European debut on 15 September 1982, in the away first leg of Betis's first round tie against Portugal's Benfica at Estádio da Luz. Betis lost 2–1, and were eliminated after suffering an identical loss in the second leg.

For 1983–84, Navarro was sent out on loan to Recreativo de Huelva in the Segunda División. He returned to Betis the following season, but broke his right knee in late 1984, and missed the rest of the season. On his recovery, he was loaned to Recreativo again in the 1985–86 season, but he played just seven matches before injuring his left knee while playing away at Elche in November 1985. Once again, he missed the rest of the season, and Betis released him from his contract, considering his career to be over after the two injuries. He had amassed a total of 61 appearances for Betis, scoring once. However, he didn't want to retire, and Recre allowed him to train with them during his recovery. At the start of the 1986–87 season, coach Víctor Espárrago offered him a permanent contract, and he returned to football.

He had a great season, which brought his total appearances in three seasons in Huelva to 77, with five goals. This earned him an offer to move back to the top flight with Cádiz, and the chance to play in his home province proved too good to resist. He joined Cádiz in 1987, and went on to play for the club for seven seasons. His first season saw Cádiz achieve the highest league placing in their history, as they finished 12th. After that, they were constantly flirting with relegation, but survived until finally being relegated in 1992–93. This spell included facing relegation playoffs twice, triumphing on each occasion: Navarro scored in the shoot-out as they beat Málaga on penalties in 1990–91, and they also saw off Figueres the following year.

His last season with the club was the 1993–94 Segunda División campaign, which saw them suffer a second consecutive relegation, before he retired in 1994 at the age of 35. He left Cádiz after 260 appearances and four goals. He is a legendary figure in the club's history, having served as club captain during one of their most successful periods. His reputation in Cádiz is rivalled only by Salvadoran forward Mágico González, who played alongside Navarro in the late 1980s. His excellent performances as a centre back drew comparisons to 1974 FIFA World Cup winning captain, Franz Beckenbauer, with his similarity to the German earning him the nickname el Beckenbauer de la Bahía, which translates as the Beckenbauer of the Bay.

== Retirement ==
After retiring, Navarro worked as a commentator for Canal Sur and Canal+, commentating on Segunda División matches. He also set up a company producing wine and vinegar. He became a councillor in El Puerto de Santa María, representing the People's Party. He resigned in 2019, choosing to dedicate more time to his business. He was part of a group of councillors being investigated for potentially perverting the course of justice, although he maintained his innocence.

== Career statistics ==
As of 18 March 2021

Club	Season	League			Cup		Europe		Other		Total	
Club	Season	Division	Apps	Goals	Apps	Goals	Apps	Goals	Apps	Goals	Apps	Goals
Racing Portuense	1977–78	Segunda División B	25	0	1	0	–		–		26	0
Racing Portuense	1978–79	Segunda División B	38	10	2	0	–		–		40	10
Racing Portuense	Total		63	10	3	0	0	0	0	0	66	10
Salamanca	1979–80	La Liga	9	0	7	1	–		–		16	1
Salamanca	1980–81	La Liga	2	0	6	1	–		–		8	1
Salamanca	Total		11	0	13	2	0	0	0	0	24	2
Real Betis	1981–82	La Liga	6	0	3	0	–		–		9	0
Real Betis	1982–83	La Liga	23	0	5	0	2	0	1	0	31	0
Real Betis	1984–85	La Liga	15	1	6	0	–		0	0	21	1
Real Betis	1985–86	La Liga	0	0	0	0	–		0	0	0	0
Real Betis	Total		44	1	14	0	2	0	1	0	61	1
Recreativo de Huelva	1983–84	Segunda División	38	2	5	1	–		0	0	43	3
Recreativo de Huelva	1985–86	Segunda División	6	1	1	0	–		0	0	7	1
Recreativo de Huelva	1986–87	Segunda División	26	1	1	0	–		–		27	1
Recreativo de Huelva	Total		70	4	7	1	0	0	0	0	77	5
Cádiz	1987–88	La Liga	36	1	4	1	–		–		40	2
Cádiz	1988–89	La Liga	37	0	6	0	–		–		43	0
Cádiz	1989–90	La Liga	38	0	9	0	–		–		47	0
Cádiz	1990–91	La Liga	38	0	8	0	–		2	0	48	0
Cádiz	1991–92	La Liga	37	0	2	0	–		2	0	41	0
Cádiz	1992–93	La Liga	37	1	4	1	–		–		41	2
Cádiz	1993–94	Segunda División	17	0	3	0	–		–		20	0
Cádiz	Total		240	2	36	2	0	0	4	0	280	4
Career total			428	17	73	5	2	0	5	0	508	22

1. Appearances in the 1982–83 UEFA Cup
2. Appearance in the 1983 Copa de la Liga
3. Appearances in the 1990–91 La Liga relegation playoff
4. Appearances in the 1991–92 La Liga relegation playoff
