= Fernando Quintanilla =

Spanish footballer

Txirri
Personal information
- Full name: Fernando Quintanilla Barañano
- Date of birth: 13 November 1964 (age 61)
- Place of birth: Barakaldo, Spain
- Height: 1.84 m (6 ft 0 in)
- Position: Central defender

Youth career
- Athletic Bilbao

Senior career*
Years	Team	Apps	(Gls)
1983–1988	Bilbao Athletic	82	(12)
1985–1990	Athletic Bilbao	47	(6)
1990–1992	CD Málaga	26	(2)
1992–1993	Atlético Marbella	25	(0)
1993–1994	Real Betis	15	(0)
1994–1996	Elche	43	(1)
1996–1997	Zamudio	32	(7)
Total		270	(28)
- * Club domestic league appearances and goals

Fernando Quintanilla Barañano (born 13 November 1964), also known by the nickname Txirri, (sometimes spelled Chirri) is a Spanish former professional footballer who played as a central defender. He featured in La Liga for Athletic Bilbao but spent most of his playing career in the second and third divisions, including spells with CD Málaga and Real Betis.

In later years he spent time as a technical staff member for clubs including Athletic Bilbao and Real Sociedad.

== Playing career ==
=== Athletic Bilbao ===
Born in Barakaldo, Biscay, Basque Country, Quintanilla was a graduate of Athletic Bilbao's youth system. He made his senior debut as a 19-year-old with the reserve team, Bilbao Athletic, in the Segunda División in October 1983 against Deportivo La Coruña, scoring his first goal in the same match.

He remained with the reserves for six seasons, enduring some major injuries and experiencing a relegation followed by a promotion, while also making occasional appearances for the first team; his La Liga debut came against CA Osasuna at the age of 21 in August 1985, having been an important figure for the reserves the previous year (34 league starts, which would prove to be the highest return in his career).

Txirri was fully integrated into the Athletic senior squad in 1989–90. The previous season he had played in the UEFA Cup against Juventus, and he featured in 26 league games following his promotion; however, he was unable to secure a regular place in the team ahead of contemporaries Genar Andrinúa and Patxi Salinas and the younger Rafael Alkorta and Patxi Ferreira – all were Spanish internationals – and he was allowed to move on, joining CD Málaga of the second tier in summer 1990.

=== Later years ===
Quintanilla's first season on the Costa del Sol was fairly successful, playing 26 times as Málaga reached the promotion playoffs despite economic difficulties; Txirri scored his penalty in the shootout against local rivals Cádiz, but the tie ended in defeat. He missed all of 1991–92 (which ended with Málaga's relegation and dissolution) due to an injury sustained on the first matchday, and then transferred to Atlético Marbella, newly-promoted to the same level.

After one year playing regularly with Marbella, prior to the 1993–94 season he moved on to a third Andalusian club in the second tier, Real Betis, following his former coach Sergije Krešić who also brought Tomás Olías and Juan Ramón Comas to Seville from Marbella. Txirri was part of the Betis team which eliminated FC Barcelona from the Copa del Rey and achieved promotion, but his involvement was curtailed due to injury, and after that single season he was allowed to leave by Krešić's replacement as manager, Lorenzo Serra Ferrer.

Quintanilla's last three campaigns were spent in the regionalised third tier, firstly with Elche for two years. In his final season as a professional, 1996–97, he returned to his home region of Biscay to play for the amateur club SD Zamudio, making their debut at that level of competition. Txirri posted his best appearance figures for a decade (32 league starts, plus seven goals) but his input could not prevent the club's immediate relegation, and he decided to retire from playing aged 33.

== Post-playing career ==
After his playing days ended, Quintanilla remained in football, embarking on a career as a support staff member. He was involved in scouting with Athletic Bilbao for several years, including acting as a liaison for local affiliated clubs. In 2015 he was removed from his position, eventually winning a case of unfair dismissal against Athletic in court, meanwhile working with the youth teams of SD Leioa. When the dispute with his former employers was resolved in 2017, he took on a similar role with their neighbours Real Sociedad, as the club from San Sebastián sought to expand their recruitment knowledge in Biscay province.

== Personal life ==
Quintanilla's son Alex is also a footballer. He too plays as a defender and was trained in the ranks of Athletic Bilbao, although he never made an appearance for the senior side.
