= Ángel Oliva =

Spanish football manager and retired player

Personal information
- Full name: Ángel Oliva Beltrán
- Date of birth: 8 August 1961 (age 65)
- Place of birth: Zaragoza, Spain
- Height: 1.84 m (6 ft 1/2 in)
- Position: Defender

Senior career*
Years	Team	Apps	(Gls)
1980–1981	Andorra	29	(1)
1981–1987	Lleida	190	(12)
1987–1994	Cádiz	209	(8)
1994–1995	San Fernando	24	(0)
Total		452	(21)

Managerial career
- 1997–1998: Cádiz B
- 2001–2002: Cádiz B
- 2005–2008: Arcos
- 2008–2009: Ronda
- 2009–2010: Cádiz B
- 2011–2012: Arcos
- 2013–2015: Ronda
- 2017–2018: Sariñena
- * Club domestic league appearances and goals

Ángel Oliva Beltrán (born 8 August 1961) is a Spanish retired footballer who played as a defender, and later worked as a manager.

== Playing career ==
Oliva was born in Zaragoza, capital of the province of the same name and of the autonomous community of Aragon, but began his career in 1980 with FC Andorra. Despite its name, and location in the principality of the same name, Andorra play in the Spanish league system, and were in Segunda División B during Oliva's sole season with the club. He joined fellow third tier side Lleida in 1981, and spent the next six seasons with the Catalan club. They won promotion to the Segunda División in 1986–87, and Oliva's part in this success earned him a move to La Liga side Cádiz. He left Lleida after 216 appearances and twelve goals in all competitions.

Cádiz flirted with relegation throughout Oliva's time with the club, needing a playoff to stay up on two occasions. Oliva scored in the shoot-out as they beat Málaga on penalties in 1990–91, and also helped them triumph over Figueres the following year. They finally were relegated in 1992–93, and Oliva stayed for one season in the second tier, in which they suffered a second consecutive relegation.

He left Cádiz in 1994 with 243 appearances and nine goals in all competitions, including seven goals in 194 top flight matches. His final club was San Fernando, with whom he spent one season in Segunda División B, before retiring in 1995 as he approached his 34th birthday.

== Coaching career ==
After his retirement, Oliva returned to Cádiz as head coach of their B team during the 1997–98 Tercera División season, at the end of which they were relegated. He returned for a somewhat more successful second season in charge of Cádiz B in 2001–02, leading them to the Primera Regional de Andalusia title. In 2005, he was appointed as head coach of Arcos in the Tercera División, a post he held for three years. He left the club after they were relegated in 2007–08. For 2008–09, he joined newly promoted Ronda, and lead them to a 12th-place finish, which was good enough to keep their place in the Tercera División. In the 2009–10 season, Oliva had a third spell at Cádiz B, guiding them to 10th in the Tercera División.

After a year away from management, Oliva returned for a second spell with Arcos, who had just returned to the Tercera División, in 2011. Under his guidance, they avoided relegation in 15th place. He revisited another former club by rejoining Ronda in 2013, guiding them to Tercera División safety in the next two seasons. In the summer of 2017, Oliva was appointed as head coach of Tercera División side Sariñena. He was dismissed in February 2018 with the club ninth in the table, twelve points shy of the promotion play-off places.

== Honours ==
=== Manager ===
Cádiz B

- Primera Regional de Andalusia: 2001–02

== Career statistics ==
=== As a player ===
As of 15 March 2021

Club	Season	League			Cup		Other		Total	
Club	Season	Division	Apps	Goals	Apps	Goals	Apps	Goals	Apps	Goals
Andorra	1980–81	Segunda División B	29	1	1	0	–		30	1
Lleida	1981–82	Segunda División B	26	2	0	0	–		26	2
Lleida	1982–83	Segunda División B	34	1	–		2	0	36	1
Lleida	1983–84	Segunda División B	24	1	2	0	6	0	32	1
Lleida	1984–85	Segunda División B	35	4	4	0	4	0	43	4
Lleida	1985–86	Segunda División B	34	1	8	0	0	0	42	1
Lleida	1986–87	Segunda División B	37	3	0	0	–		37	3
Lleida	Total		190	12	14	0	12	0	216	12
Cádiz	1987–88	La Liga	25	2	4	0	–		29	2
Cádiz	1988–89	La Liga	28	0	6	0	–		34	0
Cádiz	1989–90	La Liga	34	0	7	0	–		41	0
Cádiz	1990–91	La Liga	36	1	8	1	2	0	46	2
Cádiz	1991–92	La Liga	36	0	1	0	1	0	38	0
Cádiz	1992–93	La Liga	35	4	1	0	–		36	4
Cádiz	1993–94	Segunda División	15	1	4	0	–		19	1
Cádiz	Total		209	8	31	1	3	0	243	9
San Fernando	1994–95	Segunda División B	24	0	3	0	–		27	0
Career total			452	21	49	1	15	0	516	22

1. Appearances in the 1983 Copa de la Liga Segunda División B
2. Appearances in the 1984 Copa de la Liga Segunda División B
3. Appearances in the 1985 Copa de la Liga Segunda División B
4. Appearances in the 1990–91 La Liga relegation playoff
5. Appearance in the 1991–92 La Liga relegation playoff
