= José González (footballer, born 1966) =

Spanish footballer and manager

Personal information
- Full name: José Manuel González López
- Date of birth: 14 October 1966 (age 60)
- Place of birth: Cádiz, Spain
- Height: 1.86 m (6 ft 1 in)
- Position: Forward

Youth career
- Cádiz

Senior career*
Years	Team	Apps	(Gls)
1984–1986	Cádiz B		
1984–1991	Cádiz	94	(16)
1991–1993	Mallorca	26	(3)
1993–1994	Albacete	10	(0)
1994–1995	Rayo Vallecano	8	(0)
1996	Málaga	12	(1)
1997	Tianjin TEDA	8	(1)
Total		158	(21)

Managerial career
- 2001–2002: Cádiz (youth)
- 2002–2004: Cádiz
- 2004–2005: Albacete
- 2006–2007: Cádiz
- 2008: Córdoba
- 2009–2010: Murcia
- 2010–2012: Cádiz
- 2014–2016: Beijing Guoan (assistant)
- 2016: Granada
- 2016–2017: Beijing Guoan
- 2018: Málaga
- 2020: Wuhan Zall
- 2021–2022: Dalian Professional
- * Club domestic league appearances and goals

José Manuel González López (Spanish pronunciation: [xoˈse maˈnwel ɣonˈθaleθ ˈlopeθ]; (Note: In isolation, González is pronounced [ɡonˈθaleθ].) born 14 October 1966) is a Spanish former professional footballer who played as a forward, currently a manager.

== Playing career ==
Born in Cádiz, Andalusia, he was known simply as José during his playing days. He finished his youth career with Cádiz CF, making his senior debut with the reserves in the Tercera División. On 9 September 1984 he played his first match as a professional, starting in a 2–0 home win over RC Celta de Vigo in the Segunda División.

José was definitely promoted to the first team in summer 1986, and made his La Liga debut on 2 November of that year by coming on as a late substitute in a 1–0 away loss against RCD Español. He scored his first professional goal on 20 March 1988, his side's third in a 4–1 home defeat of Real Betis.

On 17 August 1991, after scoring a career-best seven goals to help his team avoid relegation in the play-offs, José signed a three-year deal with fellow top-tier club RCD Mallorca, for 75 million pesetas. He appeared in only five matches in his first season, which ended in relegation.

After featuring more regularly the following campaign, José joined Albacete Balompié in a return to the top flight. He subsequently represented Rayo Vallecano, Málaga CF and China's Tianjin TEDA FC, retiring with the latter in 1997 at the age of 30.

== Coaching career ==
González returned to Cádiz in 2001, being named manager of the youth setup. On 24 May 2002, he was appointed at the helm of the first team.

González won promotion from Segunda División B in his first season, and led the side to a seventh-place finish in the second. On 2 June 2004 he signed with another club he had already represented as a player, Albacete. In February of the following year, he was sacked.

On 5 November 2006, González returned to the Estadio Ramón de Carranza, taking the place of Oli. He left at the end of the campaign, and on 1 April 2008 joined Córdoba CF who were seriously threatened with relegation.

González was dismissed on 8 December 2008, and moved to Real Murcia CF (still in the second tier) on 2 November of the following year. He re-joined Cádiz after suffering relegation, leaving his post in 2012.

González was named Gregorio Manzano's assistant at Beijing Guoan F.C. from the Chinese Super League on 13 February 2014, moving alongside former Cádiz teammate José María Quevedo. On 22 February 2016, he was appointed manager at Spanish top-division Granada CF as a replacement for José Ramón Sandoval.

On 23 November 2016, González returned to Beijing Guoan, now as a head coach. He was dismissed six months later, following a poor run of results.

González moved back to his country in January 2018, taking over from the fired Míchel at Málaga. After only two wins in 19 matches, the side was relegated from the top flight as last.

On 4 January 2020, González returned to China and became the manager of Wuhan Zall FC. The city was in the midst of the coronavirus pandemic, but he pledged to stay with the club. He was relieved of his duties in September, due to a poor run of results.

González was appointed at Dalian Professional F.C. in April 2021. He was dismissed at the end of the season.

== Managerial statistics ==
As of 23 February 2022

Managerial record by team and tenure
Team	Nat	From	To	Record								Ref
Team	Nat	From	To	G	W	D	L	GF	GA	GD	Win %	Ref
Cádiz	(Spain)	24 May 2002	2 June 2004	88	40	23	25	119	87	+32	45.45	
Albacete	(Spain)	2 June 2004	20 February 2005	26	6	8	12	23	34	−11	23.08	
Cádiz	(Spain)	5 November 2006	30 June 2007	31	11	14	6	39	28	+11	35.48	
Córdoba	(Spain)	1 April 2008	8 December 2008	27	8	6	13	28	35	−7	29.63	
Murcia	(Spain)	2 November 2009	30 June 2010	33	11	11	11	39	38	+1	33.33	
Cádiz	(Spain)	16 November 2010	30 June 2012	75	39	21	15	114	66	+48	52.00	
Granada	(Spain)	22 February 2016	20 June 2016	13	5	4	4	20	18	+2	38.46	
Beijing Guoan	(China)	23 November 2016	2 June 2017	13	5	3	5	21	21	+0	38.46	
Málaga	(Spain)	13 January 2018	20 June 2018	19	2	3	14	11	28	−17	10.53	
Wuhan Zall	(China)	4 January 2020	24 September 2020	20	6	5	9	21	22	−1	30.00	
Dalian Professional	(China)	7 April 2021	12 March 2022	27	8	3	16	26	43	−17	29.63	
Career Total				371	141	101	129	460	418	+42	38.01	—
