= Gonzalo Abascal =

Chilean footballer (born 1990)

Personal information
- Date of birth: 27 December 1990 (age 35)
- Place of birth: Santiago, Chile
- Height: 1.79 m (5 ft 10 in)
- Position: Defender

Youth career
- Universidad Católica

Senior career*
| Years | Team | Apps | (Gls) |
| 2010–2011 | Universidad Católica | 0 | (0) |
| 2010–2011 | → Magallanes (loan) | 71 | (3) |
| 2012 | Rangers | 3 | (0) |
| 2012 | Rangers B | 8 | (0) |
| 2012 | Barnechea | 0 | (0) |
| 2013–2015 | Magallanes | 41 | (2) |
| 2016–2019 | Pascoe Vale | 83 | (3) |
| 2024–2025 | Unión Glorias Navales | – | (–) |
| Total | | 206 | (8) |
- * Club domestic league appearances and goals

Gonzalo Ignacio Abascal Muñoz (born 27 December 1990) is a Chilean former professional footballer who played as a defender.

== Career ==
A product of Universidad Católica youth system, Abascal started his career with Chilean second-tier side Magallanes, helping them reach the 2011 Copa Chile final. and winning the league title of the Tercera A in 2010. Before the 2012 season, Abascal signed for Rangers (Talca) in the Chilean top flight, where he made three league appearances and scored 0 goals. On 25 February 2012, he debuted for Rangers (Talca) during a 3–0 loss to Cobreloa. In 2013, Abascal returned to Chilean second-tier club Magallanes. After playing for Magallanes, he had decided to retire from football, until he signed for Pascoe Vale in the Australian second tier.

In 2024, Abascal represented Unión Glorias Navales in the Copa Chile.

== Honours ==
Magallanes

- Tercera A de Chile: 2010
