= Amelia Abascal =

Mexican sculptor (born 1920)

Amelia Abascal Gómez
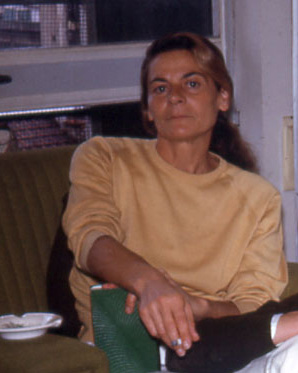
- Amelia Abascal Gómez in Valladolid, Spain, 1969.
- Born: 1920; Madrid, Spain
- Occupations: Painter, sculptor

Amelia Abascal Gómez (born 1920) was a Spanish-born Mexican painter, sculptor, and ceramist.

== Life and career ==
Abascal was born in Madrid, Spain in 1920. She was primarily a self-taught artist. After arriving in Mexico in 1940 at the age of 20, she took classes in chemistry, and applied it to her plastic arts, painting, ceramics, and designing. She was one of four artists to represent Mexico in 1968 at an exhibition in Argentina of Latin American painting. Following the Exhibition in Argentina, Abascal won acclaim with a solo exhibition at the Misrachi Art Gallery in Mexico City, Mexico in 1968.

Abascal's work involves treating bronze and copper sheets with acid to create an eroded texture. She specializes in relief sculpture, but has also produced murals.

== Works ==
Abascal's acid-treated copper plates were shown at the 1967 Galería de Arte Mexicano which was held in Mexico City, Mexico during the months of January and February. The plates were described by a critic as "abstracted vigor on to copper plates."

At the 1967 Galería de Arte Mexicano alongside Abascal's acid-treated copper plates were pieces from Carlos Merida who is credited as being one of the first Latin artists to combine European and Latin styles in painting.
