= Noriega (Ribadedeva) =

Coordinates: 43.366667°N 4.566667°W

Noriega is one of three parishes (administrative divisions) in Ribadedeva, a municipality within the province and autonomous community of Asturias, in northern Spain.

The population is 313 (INE 2011).

== Villages ==
- Bojes
- Boquerizo
- Noriega
