= Quino Cabrera =

Spanish footballer

Personal information
- Full name: Francisco Cabrera Guinovart
- Date of birth: 5 March 1971 (age 55)
- Place of birth: Málaga, Spain
- Height: 1.77 m (5 ft 9 1/2 in)
- Position: Midfielder

Senior career*
Years	Team	Apps	(Gls)
1988–1989	Atlético Malagueño		
1989–1992	CD Málaga	72	(12)
1992–1995	Cádiz	66	(4)
1995–1996	Gavà	36	(20)
1996–1999	Málaga CF	63	(6)
1999–2000	Recreativo	25	(1)
2000–2001	Badajoz	33	(1)
2001–2004	Livingston	83	(9)
2004–2010	Gavà	147	(17)
2010–2011	Begues	30	(9)
Total		555	(79)
- * Club domestic league appearances and goals

Francisco "Quino" Cabrera Guinovart (born 5 March 1971) is a Spanish former professional footballer who played as an attacking midfielder.

== Club career ==
Cabrera was born in Málaga. He played two seasons in La Liga in his country, with hometown's CD Málaga in 1989–90 and Andalusia neighbours Cádiz CF in 1992–93, with both spells ending in relegation. With the latter side, he dropped down another tier the following campaign.

Cabrera then resumed his career in Segunda División and Segunda División B. In the summer of 2001 he signed with Livingston, from CD Badajoz. He scored on his debut in a 2–1 home win against Heart of Midlothian, helping the team to the third place in the Scottish Premier League in his first year and going on to appear in 99 competitive games for the Livi Lions, scoring ten goals.

In February 2004, Cabrera returned to Spain and joined former club CF Gavà, eventually retiring after the 2009–10 season at the age of 39, with the Catalans being relegated to the Tercera División.
