= 1990–91 La Liga =

60th season of La Liga

La Liga
- Season: 1990–91
- Dates: 1 September 1990 – 9 June 1991
- Champions: Barcelona; 11th title
- Relegated: Castellón; Real Betis
- European Cup: Barcelona
- Cup Winners' Cup: Atlético Madrid
- UEFA Cup: Real Madrid; Osasuna; Sporting Gijón; Real Oviedo
- Matches: 380
- Goals: 822 (2.16 per match)
- Top goalscorer: Emilio Butragueño (19 goals)

The 1990–91 La Liga season was the 60th since its establishment. It began on 1 September 1990, and concluded on 9 June 1991. Barcelona ended Real Madrid's five-year run as champions to seal the title.

== Team information ==
=== Clubs and locations ===
Location of teams in La Liga 1990–91
Canary Islands

Team	Home city	Stadium
Athletic Bilbao	Bilbao	San Mamés
Atlético Madrid	Madrid	Vicente Calderón
Barcelona	Barcelona	Nou Camp
Cádiz	Cádiz	Ramón de Carranza
Castellón	Castellón de la Plana	Castalia
Español	Barcelona	Sarrià
Logroñés	Logroño	Las Gaunas
Mallorca	Palma	Lluís Sitjar
Osasuna	Pamplona	El Sadar
Oviedo	Oviedo	Carlos Tartiere
Real Betis	Seville	Benito Villamarín
Real Burgos	Burgos	El Plantío
Real Madrid	Madrid	Santiago Bernabéu
Real Sociedad	San Sebastián	Atocha
Sevilla	Seville	Ramón Sánchez Pizjuán
Sporting Gijón	Gijón	El Molinón
Tenerife	Santa Cruz de Tenerife	Heliodoro Rodríguez López
Valencia	Valencia	Luis Casanova
Valladolid	Valladolid	José Zorrilla
Zaragoza	Zaragoza	La Romareda

== League table ==
Pos	Team	Pld	W	D	L	GF	GA	GD	Pts	Qualification or relegation
1	Barcelona (C)	38	25	7	6	74	33	+41	57	Qualification for the European Cup first round
2	Atlético Madrid	38	17	13	8	52	28	+24	47	Qualification for the Cup Winners' Cup first round (Note: Atlético Madrid qualified for the European Cup Winners' Cup as champions of the Copa del Rey.)
3	Real Madrid	38	20	6	12	63	37	+26	46	Qualification for the UEFA Cup first round
4	Osasuna	38	15	15	8	43	34	+9	45	Qualification for the UEFA Cup first round
5	Sporting Gijón	38	16	12	10	50	37	+13	44	Qualification for the UEFA Cup first round
6	Oviedo	38	13	16	9	36	35	+1	42	Qualification for the UEFA Cup first round
7	Valencia	38	15	10	13	44	40	+4	40	
8	Sevilla	38	15	8	15	45	47	−2	38	
9	Valladolid	38	12	13	13	38	40	−2	37	
10	Logroñés	38	13	11	14	28	35	−7	37	
11	Real Burgos	38	10	17	11	32	27	+5	37	
12	Athletic Bilbao	38	15	6	17	41	50	−9	36	
13	Real Sociedad	38	11	14	13	39	45	−6	36	
14	Tenerife	38	14	7	17	37	53	−16	35	
15	Mallorca	38	9	16	13	32	40	−8	34	
16	Español	38	12	10	16	39	47	−8	34	
17	Zaragoza (O)	38	11	11	16	36	40	−4	33	Qualification for the relegation playoffs
18	Cádiz (O)	38	7	15	16	29	41	−12	29	Qualification for the relegation playoffs
19	Castellón (R)	38	8	12	18	27	48	−21	28	Relegation to the Segunda División
20	Real Betis (R)	38	6	13	19	37	65	−28	25	Relegation to the Segunda División

Source: BDFútbol
Rules for classification: 1) Points; 2) Head-to-head results; 3) Goal difference; 4) Number of goals scored
(C) Champions; (O) Play-off winners; (R) Relegated

== Promotion playoff ==
Team 1	Agg.	Team 2	1st leg	2nd leg
Murcia	2–5	Zaragoza	0–0	2–5
Málaga	1–1 (4–5 p)	Cádiz	1–0	0–1

=== First leg ===
12 June 1991	Murcia	0–0	Zaragoza	Murcia
21:30		Report (in Spanish)		Stadium: La Condomina; Attendance: 16,500; Referee: Manuel Díaz Vega (Asturias)

12 June 1991	Málaga	1–0	Cádiz	Málaga
21:30	Esteban 61'	Report (in Spanish)		Stadium: La Rosaleda; Attendance: 30,000; Referee: Joaquín Ramos Marcos (Castile and León)

=== Second leg ===
19 June 1991	Zaragoza	5–2 (5–2 agg.)	Murcia	Zaragoza
21:30	Poyet 8', 31'; Pardeza 41', 86'; Higuera 78'	Report (in Spanish)	Eraña 40'; Juanito 84'	Stadium: La Romareda; Attendance: 34,000; Referee: Antonio Martín Navarrete (Andalusia)

19 June 1991	Cádiz	1–0 (a.e.t.) (1–1 agg.) (5–4 p)	Málaga	Cádiz
21:30	José 57'	Report (in Spanish)		Stadium: Ramón de Carranza; Attendance: 20,000; Referee: Ildefonso Urizar Azpitarte (Basque Country (autonomous community))
	Penalties
	Oliva (penalty scored); Raúl (penalty missed); Poli (penalty scored); José (penalty scored); Carmelo (penalty scored); Juan José (penalty scored)		(penalty scored) Quino; (penalty scored) Txirri; (penalty scored) Esteban; (penalty scored) Álvarez; (penalty missed) Antonio Mata; (penalty missed) Emilio

== Results ==
Home \ Away	ATH	ATM	FCB	BET	CÁD	CAS	ESP	LOG	MLL	OSA	RBU	RMA	ROV	RSO	SFC	RSG	TEN	VCF	VLD	ZAR
Athletic Bilbao		2–1	0–6	4–0	1–0	1–1	1–1	1–1	2–0	2–0	2–1	1–0	2–1	2–1	2–0	1–2	2–0	0–2	0–1	2–0
Atlético Madrid	2–0		2–1	2–1	0–0	3–1	4–0	3–0	0–1	2–2	0–0	0–3	0–0	4–0	1–0	3–1	1–1	2–0	2–0	4–0
Barcelona	4–1	1–1		4–2	2–0	6–0	5–2	2–1	2–1	2–0	0–0	2–1	0–0	1–3	3–0	3–2	1–0	3–1	1–0	2–1
Betis	1–0	0–0	2–3		3–0	1–0	1–2	3–2	2–2	0–1	0–0	1–3	1–1	1–1	0–3	2–2	1–1	2–2	0–0	1–1
Cádiz	2–3	0–1	4–0	1–2		0–0	0–0	2–0	1–0	1–1	0–0	1–0	2–1	1–1	2–1	1–1	1–2	0–0	0–0	2–1
Castellón	2–0	0–0	0–1	3–1	2–0		1–1	0–0	0–1	1–0	0–0	0–3	1–0	1–1	0–0	3–2	5–1	0–2	4–2	0–0
Espanyol	1–2	3–1	0–1	2–2	2–1	1–0		0–1	3–0	0–1	1–0	3–1	5–0	1–0	4–0	0–2	1–0	0–0	2–0	0–0
Logroñés	1–1	0–1	0–2	1–0	1–1	2–1	1–0		1–2	2–0	0–0	1–0	1–0	0–0	2–1	1–2	1–0	1–0	1–2	1–1
Mallorca	0–0	1–0	1–1	1–0	0–0	0–0	4–0	2–0		1–1	0–0	1–1	1–1	2–1	1–1	1–1	0–1	0–1	0–0	3–2
Osasuna	1–0	0–3	0–0	3–0	1–1	2–0	1–0	1–1	1–0		1–0	3–3	0–0	3–1	1–0	2–1	3–1	0–2	2–1	1–0
Real Burgos	2–1	1–1	1–3	1–2	1–0	4–0	0–0	1–2	1–1	1–1		2–1	4–0	2–0	1–1	1–1	2–0	0–0	0–1	0–1
Real Madrid	4–1	0–3	1–0	3–0	2–1	1–0	2–1	0–0	3–0	0–4	0–1		1–1	2–3	7–0	2–1	3–0	4–0	1–0	2–0
Oviedo	1–1	3–0	1–0	1–0	1–1	3–0	4–1	0–0	1–0	0–0	1–1	0–0		2–1	0–0	0–0	3–1	2–1	1–0	2–1
Real Sociedad	0–1	2–1	1–1	1–0	0–0	1–1	0–0	2–0	0–0	1–1	3–1	1–1	3–1		1–1	1–0	1–3	1–0	1–1	1–0
Sevilla	3–0	1–1	0–1	3–2	2–1	3–0	1–1	1–0	1–0	2–1	1–2	2–0	3–0	1–0		1–0	2–2	2–1	1–0	1–2
Sporting Gijón	3–1	1–2	1–0	4–0	3–1	1–0	3–0	1–0	1–1	1–1	0–0	0–2	0–0	2–1	2–0		2–1	1–1	4–0	1–0
Tenerife	1–0	0–0	0–1	1–1	1–0	1–0	2–0	2–0	2–1	2–1	1–0	0–1	1–2	2–0	0–4	0–0		1–1	1–0	0–2
Valencia	2–1	1–1	2–2	3–1	2–1	1–0	2–0	0–1	1–0	1–1	0–1	2–1	1–1	0–1	2–1	0–1	4–2		2–0	2–0
Valladolid	1–0	0–0	1–5	1–1	0–0	0–0	2–0	0–0	5–1	1–1	1–0	0–1	1–0	4–2	2–1	0–0	6–2	3–1		0–0
Zaragoza	1–0	1–0	0–2	2–0	3–0	2–0	1–1	0–1	2–2	0–0	0–0	1–3	0–1	1–1	2–0	4–0	0–1	2–1	2–2	

Updated to match(es) played on unknown. Source: LFP (in Spanish)
Legend: Blue = home team win; Yellow = draw; Red = away team win.

== Top goalscorers ==
Rank	Player	Club	Goals
1	(Spain) Emilio Butragueño	Real Madrid	19
2	(Republic of Ireland) John Aldridge	Real Sociedad	17
3	(Czechoslovakia) Milan Luhový	Sporting Gijón	16
3	(Spain) Manolo	Atlético Madrid	16
5	(Spain) Luis Enrique	Sporting Gijón	14
5	(Spain) Gregorio Fonseca	Valladolid	14
5	(Spain) Pepe Mel	Real Betis	14
5	(Bulgaria) Hristo Stoichkov	Barcelona	14
5	(Poland) Jan Urban	Osasuna	14
5	(Spain) Ernesto Valverde	Athletic Bilbao	14
