= José María Quevedo =

Spanish footballer

Mami Quevedo
Personal information
- Full name: José María Quevedo García
- Date of birth: 1 June 1969 (age 57)
- Place of birth: Cádiz, Spain
- Height: 1.82 m (5 ft 11 1/2 in)
- Position: Midfielder

Youth career
- Cádiz

Senior career*
Years	Team	Apps	(Gls)
1988–1993	Cádiz	95	(11)
1993–1994	Atlético Madrid	13	(2)
1994–1998	Valladolid	114	(25)
1998–2000	Sevilla	59	(6)
2000–2003	Rayo Vallecano	78	(7)
2003–2004	Cádiz	15	(0)
Total		374	(51)

Managerial career
- 2014–2015: Beijing Guoan (assistant)
- 2016: Shanghai Shenhua (assistant)
- * Club domestic league appearances and goals

José María "Mami" Quevedo García (born 1 June 1969) is a Spanish former professional footballer who played mostly as a central midfielder.

== Club career ==
Born in Cádiz, Quevedo's professional career began with local Cádiz CF, making his La Liga debut in 1989–90 (11 matches played). Alongside another club youth graduate, Kiko, he would be instrumental as the Andalusians managed to avoid relegation to Segunda División three seasons in a row.

After Cádiz went down in 1993, Quevedo moved with Kiko to Atlético Madrid, but failed to settle unlike the centre-forward, signing for Real Valladolid after just one season. In his second year he scored a career-best 13 goals, helping the team to barely avoid top-flight relegation, and added ten the following campaign; on 19 May 1996, he and his teammate Alen Peternac accounted for all of their side's goals in a 8–3 away win against Real Oviedo, where referee José Japón Sevilla awarded a league-record six penalties.

Quevedo then joined Cádiz neighbours Sevilla FC – one promotion and one relegation – and Rayo Vallecano, helping the Madrilenians to remain three consecutive years in the top tier. He retired in July 2004 at the age of 35 with his first club, in division two.

In the 2010s, Quevedo worked as assistant to his compatriot Gregorio Manzano at Beijing Guoan F.C. and Shanghai Shenhua F.C. from the Chinese Super League.

== Personal life ==
Quevedo shared birthplace and date with Arteaga, also a Cádiz youth graduate. On 26 December 1999, he married television presenter Cristina Tàrrega.
