= Real Burgos CF =

Association football club in Spain

Real Burgos
- Full name: Real Burgos Club de Fútbol, S.A.D.
- Nickname: Rojipardillos
- Founded: 4 August 1983
- Dissolved: 2022
- 2020–21: 3ª – Group 8 (B), 10th of 12; 3ª – Group 8 (E), 11th of 11 (relegated)
| Home colours | Away colours |

Real Burgos Club de Fútbol was a Spanish football team based in Burgos, in the autonomous community of Castile and León. Founded in 1983, it ceased to compete in 1996 and returned in 2011, holding home games at Complejo Deportivo San Amaro, with a capacity of 1,000 spectators. It was dissolved in 2022, after a liquidation process.

The team's greatest success in its short history came in 1990, when they managed to promote to La Liga for the first time. Their spell in the top tier lasted three seasons, ending with relegation in 1993.

== History ==
Burgos CF was founded in 1936, also known as Gimnástica Burgalesa Club de Fútbol. In 1983, the club disappeared due to serious economic problems and the reserve team, Burgos Promesas, was renamed Real Burgos Club de Fútbol.

1990 proved to be a historic year for Real Burgos. In the 1989–90 Segunda Division season, Real Burgos managed to finish in first place and promote to La Liga for the first time, just seven years after its foundation as a professional club. In its first season in the top tier, Real Burgos surprised many by finishing in the 11th place, with 37 points and a positive goal difference of +5. The team even managed to steal points from the best in the league, by beating Real Madrid at home 2–1, and drawing against Barcelona away 0-0. The following season was even more successful for Real Burgos, as they managed to finish in the ninth place, with 37 points again. Burgos again showed skills against Barcelona, managing two draws against the eventual champions. This was the golden era of the club, as it received the nickname of Matagigantes (Killers of giants), as the club defeated Real Madrid and earned points away against Barcelona and Atlético Madrid. The third season in La Liga, however, was a failure as Real Burgos eventually finished last, with only four wins in the entire season, and collecting only 22 points.

In 1994, Real Burgos was relegated to the fourth tier due to the debts owed to its players. It did not enter any competition for the 1994–95 season, being readmitted in the league for the 1995–96 season. After this season, the club definitively ceased in activity until 2011, when Real Burgos returned to competition, taking part in the Provincial League of Burgos.

Six years later, in April 2017, the club was promoted to Tercera División where it played 21 years after the last time. However, the club could not avoid relegation in its comeback season.

In 2018, Real Burgos sued the Castile and León Football Federation, claiming a place in Tercera División alleging irregularities in the announcement of the fixtures during the last rounds of the 2017–18 season. Finally, the place was not given and Real Burgos did not enter any competition as they were later expelled from the Regional Preferente. In May 2019, the judge of a court in Majadahonda ordered the club's reinstatement in the Tercera División.

In December 2022, after withdrawing from the Primera Regional in the 2021–22 season, Real Burgos went into a liquidation process.

=== Background ===
- Burgos Promesas CF - (1970–1983) (reserve team of Burgos CF (I))
- Real Burgos CF - (1983–present)

== Season to season ==
| Season | Tier | Division | Place | Copa del Rey |
|---|---|---|---|---|
| 1983–84 | 4 | 3ª | 1st | |
| 1984–85 | 4 | 3ª | 1st | Third round |
| 1985–86 | 3 | 2ª B | 2nd | Round of 16 |
| 1986–87 | 3 | 2ª B | 4th | Second round |
| 1987–88 | 2 | 2ª | 13th | Fourth round |
| 1988–89 | 2 | 2ª | 14th | Round of 32 |
| 1989–90 | 2 | 2ª | 1st | First round |
| 1990–91 | 1 | 1ª | 11th | Fourth round |
| 1991–92 | 1 | 1ª | 9th | Round of 16 |
| 1992–93 | 1 | 1ª | 20th | Fourth round |
| 1993–94 | 2 | 2ª | 19th | Third round |
| 1994–95 | DNP | | | |
| 1995–96 | 4 | 3ª | 10th | |

| Season | Tier | Division | Place | Copa del Rey |
|---|---|---|---|---|
| 1996–2011 | DNP | | | |
| 2011–12 | 6 | 1ª Prov. | 5th | |
| 2012–13 | 6 | 1ª Prov. | 2nd | |
| 2013–14 | 5 | 1ª Reg. | 9th | |
| 2014–15 | 5 | 1ª Reg. | 11th | |
| 2015–16 | 5 | 1ª Reg. | 7th | |
| 2016–17 | 5 | 1ª Reg. | 1st | |
| 2017–18 | 4 | 3ª | 18th | |
| 2018–19 | DNP | | | |
| 2019–20 | 4 | 3ª | 11th | |
| 2020–21 | 4 | 3ª | 10th / 11th | |
| 2021–22 | 6 | 1ª Reg. | DQ | |

- 3 seasons in La Liga
- 4 seasons in Segunda División
- 2 seasons in Segunda División B
- 6 seasons in Tercera División

=== Detailed list of seasons ===
| Season | League | | | | | | | | | | | Cup |
| Season | Tier | Division | Gr | Pos | Pld | W | D | L | GF | GA | Pts | Cup |
|---|---|---|---|---|---|---|---|---|---|---|---|---|
| 1983–84 | 4 | 3ª División | 8 | 1st | 38 | 28 | 6 | 4 | 111 | 21 | 62 | |
| 1983–84 | 4 | 3ª División | PO | | 2 | 1 | 0 | 1 | 1 | 4 | | |
| 1984–85 | 4 | 3ª División | 8 | 1st | 38 | 28 | 8 | 2 | 97 | 13 | 64 | R3 |
| 1984–85 | 4 | 3ª División | PO | | 4 | 2 | 2 | 0 | 3 | 0 | | R3 |
| 1985–86 | 3 | 2ª División B | 1 | 2nd | 38 | 18 | 12 | 8 | 47 | 32 | 48 | R16 |
| 1986–87 | 3 | 2ª División B | | 4th | 42 | 19 | 16 | 7 | 45 | 20 | 54 | R2 |
| 1987–88 | 2 | 2ª División | | 13th | 38 | 11 | 12 | 15 | 34 | 50 | 34 | R4 |
| 1988–89 | 2 | 2ª División | | 14th | 38 | 9 | 18 | 11 | 27 | 34 | 36 | R32 |
| 1989–90 | 2 | 2ª División | | 1st | 38 | 18 | 14 | 6 | 53 | 24 | 50 | R1 |
| 1990–91 | 1 | La Liga | | 11th | 38 | 10 | 17 | 11 | 32 | 27 | 37 | R4 |
| 1991–92 | 1 | La Liga | | 9th | 38 | 12 | 13 | 13 | 40 | 43 | 37 | R16 |
| 1992–93 | 1 | La Liga | | 20th | 38 | 4 | 14 | 20 | 29 | 69 | 22 | R4 |
| 1993–94 | 2 | 2ª División | | 19th | 38 | 10 | 6 | 22 | 38 | 68 | 26 | R3 |
| 1994–95 | did not enter any competition | | | | | | | | | | | |
| 1995–96 | 4 | 3ª División | 8 | 10th | 38 | 13 | 15 | 12 | 50 | 51 | 54 | |
| 1996–2011 | did not enter any competition | | | | | | | | | | | |
| 2011–12 | 6 | 1ª Provincial | S | 5th | 20 | 8 | 5 | 7 | 31 | 33 | 29 | |
| 2012–13 | 6 | 1ª Provincial | S | 1st | 18 | 14 | 4 | 0 | 54 | 15 | 46 | |
| 2012–13 | 6 | 1ª Provincial | GP | 2nd | 14 | 7 | 4 | 1 | 26 | 6 | 25 | |
| 2013–14 | 5 | 1ª Regional | 1 | 9th | 32 | 13 | 7 | 12 | 55 | 57 | 43 | |
| 2014–15 | 5 | 1ª Regional | 1 | 11th | 31 | 10 | 8 | 13 | 52 | 57 | 38 | |
| 2015–16 | 5 | 1ª Regional | 1 | 7th | 33 | 14 | 8 | 11 | 41 | 42 | 50 | |
| 2016–17 | 5 | 1ª Regional | 1 | 1st | 34 | 26 | 7 | 1 | 86 | 22 | 85 | |
| 2017–18 | 4 | 3ª División | 8 | 18th | 38 | 8 | 8 | 22 | 31 | 82 | 32 | |
| 2018–19 | did not enter any competition | | | | | | | | | | | |
| 2019–20 | 4 | 3ª División | 8 | 11th | 29 | 10 | 6 | 13 | 36 | 39 | 36 | |
| 2020–21 | 4 | 3ª División | 8B | 10th | 22 | 4 | 7 | 11 | 18 | 37 | 19 | |
| 2020–21 | 4 | 3ª División | 8E | 11th | 32 | 5 | 7 | 20 | 25 | 59 | 22 | |
| 2021–22 | 6 | 1ª Regional | 1 | DQ | 0 | 0 | 0 | 0 | 0 | 0 | 0 | |

== Selected former players ==
- (Romania) Gavril Balint
- (Croatia) Ivica Barbarić
- (Bosnia and Herzegovina) Predrag Jurić
- (Hungary) Zsolt Limperger
- (Spain) Agustín Elduayen
- (Spain) Loren
- (Spain) Javier Olaizola
