= 1998 Segunda División B play-offs =

Spanish football league play-offs

The 1998 Segunda División B play-offs (Playoffs de Ascenso or Promoción de Ascenso) were the final playoffs for promotion from 1997–98 Segunda División B to the 1998–99 Segunda División. The four first placed teams in each of the four Segunda División B groups played the Playoffs de Ascenso and the four last placed teams in Segunda División were relegated to Segunda División B.

The teams play a league of four teams, divided into 4 groups. The champion of each group is promoted to Segunda División.

== Group A ==
=== League table ===
Pos	Team	Pld	W	D	L	GF	GA	GD	Pts	Promotion or relegation
1	Málaga CF (P)	6	3	1	2	12	8	+4	10	Promotion to Segunda División
2	Terrassa	6	3	1	2	9	8	+1	10	
3	Talavera CF	6	2	3	1	8	7	+1	9	
4	SD Beasaín	6	0	3	3	6	12	−6	3	

Source: arquero-arba
Rules for classification: 1st points; 2nd head-to-head points; 3rd head-to-head goal difference; 4th head-to-head goals scored; 5th goal difference; 6th number of goals scored
(P) Promoted

=== Results ===
Home \ Away	MAL	TER	TAL	BEA
Málaga CF		4–1	1–1	4–0
Terrassa	3–0		0–2	2–1
Talavera CF	2–1	0–2		2–2
SD Beasaín	1–2	1–1	1–1	

Source: arquero-arba
Legend: Blue = home team win; Yellow = draw; Red = away team win.

== Group B ==
=== League table ===
Pos	Team	Pld	W	D	L	GF	GA	GD	Pts	Promotion or relegation
1	RCD Mallorca B (P)	6	5	0	1	12	8	+4	15	Promotion to Segunda División
2	Granada CF	6	3	0	3	9	7	+2	9	
3	Athletic Club B	6	2	1	3	7	9	−2	7	
4	CP Cacereño	6	1	1	4	6	10	−4	4	

Source: arquero-arba
Rules for classification: 1st points; 2nd head-to-head points; 3rd head-to-head goal difference; 4th head-to-head goals scored; 5th goal difference; 6th number of goals scored
(P) Promoted

=== Results ===
Home \ Away	MAL	GCF	ATH	CAC
RCD Mallorca B		4–3	2–1	2–0
Granada CF	2–0		2–0	1–2
Athletic Club B	1–2	1–0		3–2
CP Cacereño	1–2	0–1	1–1	

Source: arquero-arba
Legend: Blue = home team win; Yellow = draw; Red = away team win.

== Group C ==
=== League table ===
Pos	Team	Pld	W	D	L	GF	GA	GD	Pts	Promotion or relegation
1	FC Barcelona B (P)	6	4	1	1	14	5	+9	13	Promotion to Segunda División
2	Real Madrid B	6	2	2	2	6	10	−4	8	
3	Cádiz CF	6	2	2	2	10	8	+2	8	
4	Cultural Leonesa	6	0	3	3	7	14	−7	3	

Source: arquero-arba
Rules for classification: 1st points; 2nd head-to-head points; 3rd head-to-head goal difference; 4th head-to-head goals scored; 5th goal difference; 6th number of goals scored
(P) Promoted

=== Results ===
Home \ Away	BAR	RMA	CAD	CLE
FC Barcelona B		5–0	0–0	5–2
Real Madrid B	0–2		2–1	1–1
Cádiz CF	3–1	0–2		4–1
Cultural Leonesa	0–1	1–1	2–2	

Source: arquero-arba
Legend: Blue = home team win; Yellow = draw; Red = away team win.

== Group D ==
=== League table ===
Pos	Team	Pld	W	D	L	GF	GA	GD	Pts	Promotion or relegation
1	Recreativo de Huelva (P)	6	5	0	1	7	3	+4	15	Promotion to Segunda División
2	Barakaldo CF	6	2	2	2	8	8	0	8	
3	RCD Espanyol B	6	2	1	3	10	6	+4	7	
4	Deportivo de La Coruña B	6	1	1	4	6	14	−8	4	

Source: arquero-arba
Rules for classification: 1st points; 2nd head-to-head points; 3rd head-to-head goal difference; 4th head-to-head goals scored; 5th goal difference; 6th number of goals scored
(P) Promoted

=== Results ===
Home \ Away	RHU	BAR	ESP	DCO
Recreativo de Huelva		0–1	2–1	1–0
Barakaldo CF	1–2		1–1	1–2
RCD Espanyol B	0–1	0–1		3–0
Deportivo de La Coruña B	0–1	3–3	1–5	

Source: arquero-arba
Legend: Blue = home team win; Yellow = draw; Red = away team win.
