= Chiclana CF =

Spanish football club

Chiclana
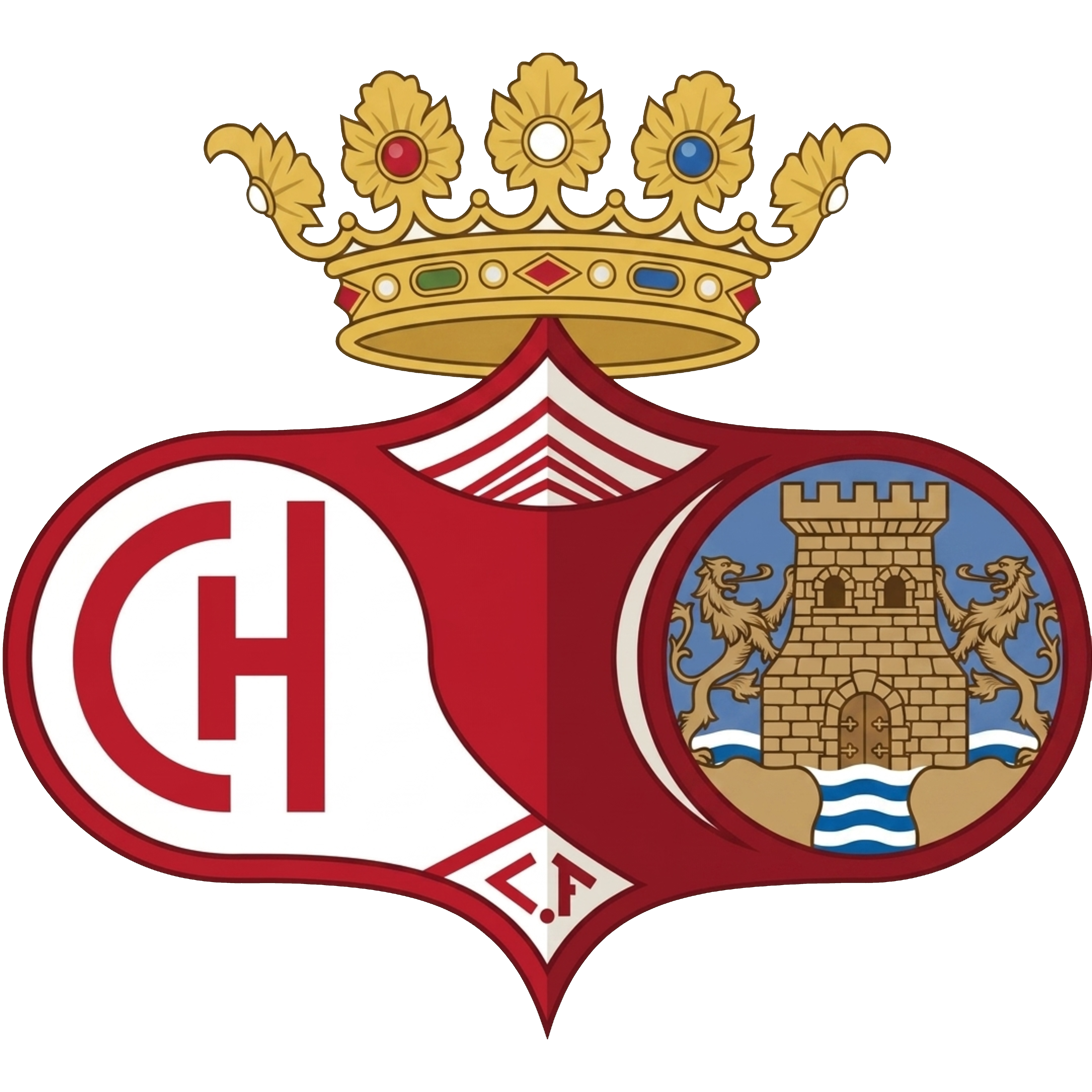
- Full name: Chiclana Club de Fútbol
- Founded: 1948; 1957; 69 years ago (refounded)
- Ground: Estadio Municipal, Chiclana, Andalusia, Spain
- Capacity: 4,000
- President: Rafael Sánchez Colchón
- Head coach: José Mari Suazo
- League: Tercera Federación – Group 10
- 2025–26: Tercera Federación – Group 10, 12th of 18
Home colours	Away colours

Chiclana Club de Fútbol is a Spanish football team based in Chiclana de la Frontera, Province of Cádiz, in the autonomous community of Andalusia. Founded in 1948, it plays in Tercera Federación – Group 10, holding home games at Estadio Municipal de Chiclana, with a 4,000-seat capacity.

== Season to season ==
Season	Tier	Division	Place	Copa del Rey
1948–1954	—	Regional	—	
1954–55	3	3ª	10th	
1955–56	3	3ª	11th	
1956–57	3	3ª	16th	
1957–58	4	1ª Reg.		
1958–59	4	1ª Reg.	7th	
1959–60	4	1ª Reg.	4th	
1960–61	4	1ª Reg.	1st	
1961–62	4	1ª Reg.		
1962–63	4	1ª Reg.		
1963–64	3	3ª	10th	
1964–65	3	3ª	15th	
1965–66	3	3ª	16th	
1966–67	4	1ª Reg.		
1967–68	4	1ª Reg.		
1968–69	4	1ª Reg.	4th	
1969–70	4	1ª Reg.	3rd	
1970–71	4	1ª Reg.	5th	
1971–72	4	1ª Reg.	14th	
1972–73	4	1ª Reg.	17th	

Season	Tier	Division	Place	Copa del Rey
1973–74	4	1ª Reg.	12th	
1974–75	4	1ª Reg.	3rd	
1975–76	4	Reg. Pref.	21st	
1976–77	5	1ª Reg.	12th	
1977–78	6	1ª Reg.	9th	
1978–79	6	1ª Reg.	3rd	
1979–80	6	1ª Reg.	4th	
1980–81	5	Reg. Pref.	10th	
1981–82	5	Reg. Pref.	11th	
1982–83	5	Reg. Pref.	5th	
1983–84	4	3ª	16th	
1984–85	4	3ª	17th	
1985–86	4	3ª	18th	
1986–87	5	Reg. Pref.	8th	
1987–88	5	Reg. Pref.	2nd	
1988–89	4	3ª	10th	
1989–90	4	3ª	12th	
1990–91	4	3ª	8th	
1991–92	4	3ª	15th	
1992–93	4	3ª	20th	

Season	Tier	Division	Place	Copa del Rey
1993–94	5	Reg. Pref.	2nd	
1994–95	4	3ª	3rd	
1995–96	4	3ª	4th	
1996–97	4	3ª	18th	
1997–98	4	3ª	7th	
1998–99	4	3ª	7th	
1999–2000	4	3ª	17th	
2000–01	4	3ª	18th	
2001–02	5	Reg. Pref.	8th	
2002–03	5	Reg. Pref.	2nd	
2003–04	4	3ª	10th	
2004–05	4	3ª	11th	
2005–06	4	3ª	11th	
2006–07	4	3ª	20th	
2007–08	5	1ª And.	2nd	
2008–09	4	3ª	18th	
2009–10	5	1ª And.	7th	
2010–11	5	1ª And.	4th	
2011–12	5	1ª And.	5th	
2012–13	5	1ª And.	14th	

Season	Tier	Division	Place	Copa del Rey
2013–14	5	1ª And.	6th	
2014–15	5	1ª And.	4th	
2015–16	5	1ª And.	7th	
2016–17	5	Div. Hon.	15th	
2017–18	6	1ª And.	6th	
2018–19	6	1ª And.	1st	
2019–20	5	Div. Hon.	5th	
2020–21	5	Div. Hon.	2nd	
2021–22	6	Div. Hon.	11th	
2022–23	6	Div. Hon.	4th	
2023–24	6	Div. Hon.	4th	First round
2024–25	6	Div. Hon.	1st	First round
2025–26	5	3ª Fed.	12th	
2026–27	5	3ª Fed.		

- 26 seasons in Tercera División
- 1 season in Tercera Federación

== Notable former players ==
- (Spain) Arteaga
