= Raúl Procopio =

Spanish footballer

Personal information
- Full name: Raúl Procopio Baizán
- Date of birth: 10 July 1968 (age 58)
- Place of birth: Cádiz, Spain
- Height: 1.78 m (5 ft 10 in)
- Position: Right back

Team information
- Current team: St Joseph's (coach)

Youth career
- Cádiz

Senior career*
Years	Team	Apps	(Gls)
- Cádiz B
1989–1996	Cádiz	167	(5)
1996–1997	Manchego	13	(0)
1997–1998	Yeclano	14	(1)
1998–2001	Linense		
2001–2002	San Fernando	17	(0)
2002	Puerto Real		
2002–2004	Chiclana		

Managerial career
- 2004–2005: Chiclana Industrial (youth)
- 2005–2006: Chiclana Industrial
- 2006–2007: Linense
- 2007–2008: Cádiz B
- 2008: Cádiz
- 2008–2010: Estepona
- 2010: Extremadura
- 2011: Poli Ejido
- 2014–2016: Lincoln Red Imps
- 2016: Chiclana
- 2016–: St Joseph's
- * Club domestic league appearances and goals

Raúl Procopio Baizán (born 10 July 1968), simply known as Raúl, is a Spanish retired footballer who played as a right back, and is the manager of Gibraltarian club St Joseph's FC.

== Playing career ==
Raúl was born in Cádiz, Andalusia, and represented Cádiz CF as a youth. He made his first team – and La Liga – debut on 11 January 1989, coming on as a late substitute for Mágico González in a 1–0 away win against Real Zaragoza.

Raúl scored his first professional goal on 14 October 1989, netting the opener in a 1–1 draw at Sevilla FC. He featured regularly for the club in the following campaigns, suffering two consecutive relegations.

Raúl subsequently resumed his career in the lower leagues, never appearing in any higher than Segunda División B. He represented CD Manchego, Yeclano CF, Real Balompédica Linense, CD San Fernando, Puerto Real CF and Chiclana CF, retiring with the latter in 2004.

== Managerial career ==
Immediately after retiring Raúl took up coaching, being in charge of Chiclana Industrial CF's youth setup. In 2005, he was named manager of the main squad before taking over Tercera División side Linense in the following year.

On 26 November 2007, Raúl was named manager of former side Cádiz's B-team. The following 7 April, following the dismissal of Antonio Calderón, he took over the first team, but was himself dismissed on 27 May.

In July 2008, Raúl was appointed manager of Unión Estepona CF in the fourth division, achieving immediate promotion before departing in June 2010. On 1 March 2011, he was named in charge of third division strugglers Extremadura UD, but failed to avoid relegation at the end of the season.

In July 2011, Raúl was presented at Polideportivo Ejido, being sacked on 12 October due to poor results. On 23 July 2014, after more than two years without a club, he was announced as new manager of Gibraltar Premier Division side Lincoln Red Imps FC.

Raúl opted to leave Lincoln in June 2016, and was appointed manager of Chiclana CF on 28 October. On 20 December, however, he accepted an offer from St Joseph's FC and left the club.
