= 1991–92 La Liga =

61st season of La Liga

La Liga
- Season: 1991–92
- Dates: 31 August 1991 – 7 June 1992
- Champions: Barcelona; 12th title
- Relegated: Valladolid; Mallorca
- Champions League: Barcelona
- Cup Winners' Cup: Atlético Madrid
- UEFA Cup: Real Madrid; Valencia; Real Sociedad; Zaragoza
- Matches: 380
- Goals: 913 (2.4 per match)
- Top goalscorer: Manolo (27 goals)

The 1991–92 La Liga season was the 61st since its establishment. It began on 31 August 1991, and concluded on 7 June 1992. After the penultimate game, Real Madrid led by 1 point and needed to win away to Tenerife, managed by their former player Jorge Valdano, to seal the title. Despite taking a 2–0 lead, Madrid lost 3–2. The result meant that Barcelona – which also won the European Cup for the first time in club history – finished the season as champions for the second season running.

== Team information ==
=== Clubs and locations ===
Location of teams in La Liga 1991–92
Canary Islands

Team	Home city	Stadium
Albacete	Albacete	Carlos Belmonte
Athletic Bilbao	Bilbao	San Mamés
Atlético Madrid	Madrid	Vicente Calderón
Barcelona	Barcelona	Nou Camp
Cádiz	Cádiz	Ramón de Carranza
Deportivo La Coruña	A Coruña	Riazor
Español	Barcelona	Sarrià
Logroñés	Logroño	Las Gaunas
Mallorca	Palma	Lluís Sitjar
Osasuna	Pamplona	El Sadar
Oviedo	Oviedo	Carlos Tartiere
Real Burgos	Burgos	El Plantío
Real Madrid	Madrid	Santiago Bernabéu
Real Sociedad	San Sebastián	Atocha
Sevilla	Seville	Ramón Sánchez Pizjuán
Sporting Gijón	Gijón	El Molinón
Tenerife	Santa Cruz de Tenerife	Heliodoro Rodríguez López
Valencia	Valencia	Luis Casanova
Valladolid	Valladolid	José Zorrilla
Zaragoza	Zaragoza	La Romareda

== League table ==
Pos	Team	Pld	W	D	L	GF	GA	GD	Pts	Qualification or relegation
1	Barcelona (C)	38	23	9	6	87	37	+50	55	Qualification for the Champions League first round
2	Real Madrid	38	23	8	7	78	32	+46	54	Qualification for the UEFA Cup first round
3	Atlético Madrid	38	24	5	9	67	35	+32	53	Qualification for the Cup Winners' Cup first round (Note: Atlético Madrid qualified for the European Cup Winners' Cup as champions of the Copa del Rey.)
4	Valencia	38	20	7	11	63	42	+21	47	Qualification for the UEFA Cup first round
5	Real Sociedad	38	16	12	10	44	38	+6	44	Qualification for the UEFA Cup first round
6	Zaragoza	38	17	7	14	40	41	−1	41	Qualification for the UEFA Cup first round
7	Albacete	38	16	8	14	45	47	−2	40	
8	Sporting Gijón	38	15	8	15	37	43	−6	38	
9	Real Burgos	38	12	13	13	40	43	−3	37	
10	Logroñés	38	13	10	15	36	51	−15	36	
11	Oviedo	38	14	8	16	41	46	−5	36	
12	Sevilla	38	13	8	17	48	45	+3	34	
13	Tenerife	38	12	10	16	46	50	−4	34	
14	Athletic Bilbao	38	13	7	18	38	58	−20	33	
15	Osasuna	38	10	13	15	30	40	−10	33	
16	Español	38	12	8	18	43	60	−17	32	
17	Deportivo La Coruña (O)	38	8	15	15	37	48	−11	31	Qualification for the relegation playoffs
18	Cádiz (O)	38	7	14	17	32	55	−23	28	Qualification for the relegation playoffs
19	Valladolid (R)	38	7	13	18	31	53	−22	27	Relegation to the Segunda División
20	Mallorca (R)	38	10	7	21	30	49	−19	27	Relegation to the Segunda División

Source: BDFútbol
Rules for classification: 1) Points; 2) Head-to-head results; 3) Goal difference; 4) Number of goals scored
(C) Champions; (O) Play-off winners; (R) Relegated

== Relegation playoff ==
Team 1	Agg.	Team 2	1st leg	2nd leg
Deportivo La Coruña	2–1	Real Betis	2–1	0–0
Cádiz	3–1	Figueres	2–0	1–1

=== First leg ===
10 June 1992	Deportivo La Coruña	2–1	Real Betis	A Coruña
21:00	Albístegui 25' (pen.); Kiryakov 59'	Report (in Spanish)	Loreto 46'	Stadium: Riazor; Attendance: 25,000; Referee: Joaquín Urio Velázquez (Basque Country (autonomous community))

14 June 1992	Cádiz	2–0	Figueres	Cádiz
20:00	Tilico 42'; Fali 79'	Report (in Spanish)		Stadium: Ramón de Carranza; Attendance: 15,000; Referee: Manuel Díaz Vega (Asturias)

=== Second leg ===
17 June 1992	Real Betis	0–0 (1–2 agg.)	Deportivo La Coruña	Seville
21:30		Report (in Spanish)		Stadium: Benito Villamarín; Attendance: 55,000; Referee: Juan Ansuátegui Roca (Valencian Community)

21 June 1992	Figueres	1–1 (1–3 agg.)	Cádiz	Figueres
20:00	Altimira 86'	Report (in Spanish)	Quevedo 75'	Stadium: Vilatenim; Attendance: 9,400; Referee: Raúl García de Loza (Galicia (Spain))

== Results table ==
Home \ Away	ALB	ATH	ATM	FCB	CÁD	RCD	ESP	LOG	MLL	OSA	RBU	RMA	ROV	RSO	SFC	RSG	TEN	VCF	VLD	ZAR
Albacete		4–0	3–1	1–1	0–1	3–0	3–2	2–0	1–0	1–0	1–0	1–3	2–0	0–1	0–0	0–2	1–1	1–0	3–1	1–1
Athletic Bilbao	1–0		3–2	0–2	3–1	0–0	0–2	1–2	2–0	2–1	0–0	1–4	0–0	2–1	0–2	2–0	3–1	2–3	2–0	1–0
Atlético Madrid	4–1	3–1		2–2	5–1	1–2	3–0	2–1	3–0	1–0	2–0	2–0	3–1	5–1	0–3	2–1	1–0	1–0	5–1	2–1
Barcelona	7–1	2–0	1–0		4–1	4–1	4–3	1–0	3–0	2–0	1–1	1–1	1–2	2–0	1–0	1–1	5–3	3–1	2–1	3–1
Cádiz	1–1	1–0	1–1	0–2		1–0	2–1	2–0	1–3	2–2	0–2	0–1	3–1	0–0	1–1	1–1	0–0	2–0	0–0	0–0
Deportivo La Coruña	2–2	0–0	1–1	0–4	1–1		2–2	2–2	1–0	0–0	2–2	0–3	0–0	0–0	3–1	5–2	1–1	0–1	1–0	3–0
Espanyol	2–0	2–0	1–2	0–4	3–1	0–3		3–0	3–2	3–2	0–0	1–5	0–1	2–0	1–1	2–0	2–2	0–0	0–2	1–0
Logroñés	1–1	0–1	1–0	2–2	2–1	2–1	2–1		2–1	0–0	1–2	1–0	2–0	1–1	1–0	0–0	2–0	0–0	0–0	0–2
Mallorca	0–1	1–2	0–2	1–2	1–0	4–2	1–0	2–1		1–1	2–2	0–0	2–1	2–1	1–0	0–1	0–2	0–1	1–1	0–1
Osasuna	2–0	1–1	1–1	0–0	1–0	0–1	0–1	3–0	1–0		1–1	1–1	1–0	1–0	1–0	0–2	2–0	0–1	1–1	1–0
Real Burgos	3–1	2–0	1–1	2–2	1–1	0–0	2–1	2–0	0–0	4–0		0–2	1–0	0–1	1–0	0–1	3–1	2–1	1–0	0–1
Real Madrid	2–1	5–0	3–2	1–1	1–1	1–0	7–0	3–0	2–0	5–2	2–0		0–0	4–1	3–1	1–0	2–1	2–1	1–0	2–0
Oviedo	0–1	1–1	0–1	0–2	2–1	2–1	1–0	2–3	0–0	3–1	3–1	1–0		2–0	1–0	1–0	2–0	2–2	2–1	2–1
Real Sociedad	0–1	2–0	0–2	2–1	1–0	1–1	1–1	4–0	1–0	0–0	4–0	2–2	2–1		2–1	0–0	1–0	3–1	1–0	0–0
Sevilla	3–0	1–2	0–1	4–2	0–0	0–0	2–1	0–1	2–0	1–0	3–2	1–0	1–1	2–2		2–1	4–1	2–3	2–1	3–0
Sporting Gijón	0–2	3–2	0–1	2–1	2–1	1–0	3–0	1–1	2–0	1–0	0–0	1–4	1–0	0–1	2–1		1–1	0–3	1–0	1–2
Tenerife	2–3	4–1	0–1	2–1	3–1	1–0	0–1	3–0	0–1	0–0	4–1	3–2	1–0	0–0	4–1	0–0		2–1	0–0	1–0
Valencia	1–1	3–1	2–0	1–0	4–0	2–1	1–0	1–1	1–1	1–2	1–1	2–1	6–3	1–2	3–2	3–1	1–0		3–1	0–1
Valladolid	1–0	1–1	0–1	0–6	2–2	2–0	0–0	1–2	2–1	1–1	2–0	2–1	1–1	2–2	1–0	0–1	2–2	1–4		0–0
Zaragoza	1–0	1–0	1–0	0–4	3–0	1–0	1–1	3–2	1–2	2–0	1–0	1–1	3–2	1–3	1–1	3–1	3–0	0–3	2–0	

Updated to match(es) played on unknown. Source: LFP (in Spanish)
Legend: Blue = home team win; Yellow = draw; Red = away team win.

== Top goalscorers ==
Rank	Player	Club	Goals
1	(Spain) Manolo	Atlético Madrid	27
2	(Spain) Fernando Hierro	Real Madrid	21
3	(Bulgaria) Hristo Stoichkov	Barcelona	17
4	(Netherlands) Ronald Koeman	Barcelona	16
5	(Spain) Gregorio Fonseca	Valladolid	15
5	(Argentina) Juan Antonio Pizzi	Tenerife	15
7	(Spain) Emilio Butragueño	Real Madrid	14
7	(Austria) Anton Polster	Logroñés	14
9	(Socialist Federal Republic of Yugoslavia) (Bosnia and Herzegovina) Meho Kodro	Real Sociedad	13
9	(Bulgaria) Luboslav Penev	Valencia	13
9	(Uruguay) José Zalazar	Albacete	13
