= 1992–93 La Liga =

62nd season of La Liga

La Liga
- Season: 1992–93
- Dates: 5 September 1992 – 20 June 1993
- Champions: Barcelona; 13th title
- Relegated: Español; Cádiz; Real Burgos
- Champions League: Barcelona
- UEFA Cup: Deportivo La Coruña; Valencia; Tenerife; Atlético Madrid
- Cup Winners' Cup: Real Madrid
- Matches: 380
- Goals: 954 (2.51 per match)
- Top goalscorer: Bebeto (29 goals)

The 1992–93 La Liga season was the 62nd since its establishment. It began on 5 September 1992, and concluded on 20 June 1993. The previous season, after the penultimate game, Real Madrid had led by 1 point but lost the title to Barcelona after losing at Tenerife. History repeated, with Real Madrid leading by 1 point before the final game but losing 2-0 at Tenerife, which allowed Barcelona to win the title for a third successive season.

== Team information ==
=== Clubs and locations ===
Location of teams in La Liga 1992–93
Canary Islands

Team	Stadium	Capacity
Barcelona	Camp Nou	98,772
Real Madrid	Santiago Bernabéu	80,354
Atlético Madrid	Vicente Calderón	55,005
Valencia	Mestalla	55,000
Sevilla	Ramón Sánchez Pizjuán	45,500
Espanyol	Sarrià	41,000
Athletic Bilbao	San Mamés	39,750
Deportivo de La Coruña	Riazor	34,600
Real Zaragoza	La Romareda	34,596
Celta de Vigo	Estadio Balaídos	32,500
Real Sociedad	Atotxa	17,200
Real Oviedo	Carlos Tartiere	23,500
Sporting de Gijón	El Molinón	25,885
Cádiz	Ramón de Carranza	23,000
Tenerife	Heliodoro Rodríguez López	22,824
Osasuna	El Sadar	19,800
Albacete	Carlos Belmonte	18,000
Rayo Vallecano	Vallecas	14,708
Real Burgos	El Plantío	12,200
Logroñés	Las Gaunas	9,552

== League table ==
Pos	Team	Pld	W	D	L	GF	GA	GD	Pts	Qualification or relegation
1	Barcelona (C)	38	25	8	5	87	34	+53	58	Qualification for the Champions League first round
2	Real Madrid	38	24	9	5	75	28	+47	57	Qualification for the Cup Winners' Cup first round (Note: Real Madrid entered European Cup Winners' Cup as winners of 1992–93 Copa del Rey.)
3	Deportivo La Coruña	38	22	10	6	67	33	+34	54	Qualification for the UEFA Cup first round
4	Valencia	38	19	10	9	60	33	+27	48	Qualification for the UEFA Cup first round
5	Tenerife	38	15	14	9	59	47	+12	44	Qualification for the UEFA Cup first round
6	Atlético Madrid	38	16	11	11	52	42	+10	43 (Note: SEV 1–3 ATM; ATM 1–0 SEV)	Qualification for the UEFA Cup first round
7	Sevilla	38	17	9	12	46	44	+2	43	
8	Athletic Bilbao	38	17	6	15	53	49	+4	40	
9	Zaragoza	38	11	13	14	37	52	−15	35	
10	Osasuna	38	12	10	16	42	41	+1	34 (Note: OSA: 10 pts; CEL: 7 pts; SPG: 4 pts; RSO: 3 pts)	
11	Celta Vigo	38	9	16	13	25	32	−7	34	
12	Sporting Gijón	38	11	12	15	38	57	−19	34	
13	Real Sociedad	38	13	8	17	46	59	−13	34	
14	Rayo Vallecano	38	8	17	13	40	49	−9	33 (Note: RVA 2–1 LOG; LOG 0–0 RVA)	
15	Logroñés	38	11	11	16	32	48	−16	33	
16	Oviedo	38	11	10	17	42	52	−10	32	
17	Albacete (O)	38	11	9	18	54	59	−5	31	Qualification for the relegation playoffs
18	Español (R)	38	9	11	18	40	56	−16	29	Qualification for the relegation playoffs
19	Cádiz (R)	38	5	12	21	30	70	−40	22 (Note: RBU 0–2 CÁD; CÁD 3–2 RBU)	Relegation to the Segunda División
20	Real Burgos (R)	38	4	14	20	29	69	−40	22	Relegation to the Segunda División

Source: LFP
Rules for classification: 1) points; 2) head-to-head points; 3) head-to-head goal difference; 4) head-to-head goals scored; 5) goal difference; 6) number of goals scored.
(C) Champions; (O) Play-off winners; (R) Relegated

== Results ==
Home \ Away	ALB	ATH	ATM	FCB	CÁD	CEL	RCD	ESP	LOG	OSA	RVA	RBU	RMA	ROV	RSO	SFC	RSG	TEN	VCF	ZAR
Albacete		4–5	2–1	0–2	5–0	1–0	1–1	2–0	3–1	0–0	1–0	4–0	0–3	2–0	1–2	3–4	6–2	1–0	0–1	1–3
Athletic Bilbao	3–1		1–2	1–0	2–1	0–1	0–1	2–0	2–0	1–0	4–2	1–1	1–1	1–0	2–0	2–1	0–0	2–2	1–4	3–2
Atlético Madrid	3–2	1–1		1–4	2–0	1–1	2–1	2–1	0–1	2–1	1–0	2–0	1–1	2–1	0–0	1–0	1–1	3–2	1–1	2–2
Barcelona	3–3	2–1	1–1		4–1	2–0	3–0	5–0	3–0	2–1	4–0	4–1	2–1	2–0	1–0	2–1	7–2	1–1	3–0	1–0
Cádiz	1–1	2–3	1–1	0–4		1–1	0–3	1–0	2–2	0–2	1–1	3–2	1–1	0–2	2–1	0–0	2–3	1–3	0–2	1–1
Celta de Vigo	1–1	1–0	0–2	3–2	1–0		0–0	0–1	2–0	0–0	0–0	1–1	1–1	0–0	2–1	1–2	0–0	0–1	0–0	0–1
Deportivo La Coruña	3–2	3–0	1–1	1–0	3–0	2–0		3–0	0–1	2–1	1–1	5–0	3–2	2–1	5–1	2–0	2–1	2–2	0–0	1–0
Espanyol	2–0	2–0	1–3	0–1	1–2	0–0	0–2		0–1	2–1	2–2	3–1	1–3	2–0	4–1	1–1	1–2	0–0	1–1	2–0
Logroñés	1–0	0–1	2–1	1–2	1–0	0–1	0–3	0–0		1–1	0–0	0–1	0–3	1–0	0–1	2–0	1–2	2–0	3–2	0–0
Osasuna	3–0	1–2	1–0	0–1	1–1	3–0	1–1	1–3	1–2		1–0	1–0	0–0	2–1	2–0	0–1	3–0	1–2	2–2	1–0
Rayo Vallecano	2–2	1–0	2–0	3–3	1–1	0–1	1–1	1–1	2–1	1–0		2–1	2–0	2–2	1–1	0–1	2–2	2–2	0–1	0–0
Real Burgos	0–0	1–1	0–2	0–1	0–2	1–1	0–0	1–1	2–2	1–0	0–3		1–2	1–1	4–0	0–2	2–1	0–3	1–1	1–1
Real Madrid	3–0	2–0	1–0	2–1	3–1	1–0	2–1	3–1	2–2	3–0	1–1	3–0		3–2	2–0	5–0	0–0	3–0	2–0	4–0
Oviedo	0–0	1–0	1–4	1–0	2–1	3–1	3–3	2–2	0–0	1–2	1–1	3–0	0–4		2–2	1–1	2–1	1–2	0–1	4–1
Real Sociedad	2–1	1–0	1–0	2–2	3–0	1–1	0–2	4–1	3–0	1–3	1–2	2–2	1–5	1–0		1–0	1–2	3–1	1–0	1–1
Sevilla	2–1	3–1	1–3	0–0	1–0	1–0	1–3	1–1	3–0	0–0	3–2	1–1	2–0	0–1	3–1		1–0	1–0	2–2	1–0
Sporting Gijón	1–0	0–4	2–1	1–1	1–0	0–3	0–1	1–1	1–1	0–0	1–0	0–0	0–0	0–1	2–4	1–3		1–2	1–0	3–1
Tenerife	2–2	2–1	2–2	1–1	1–1	1–0	3–1	2–1	1–1	2–2	4–0	3–1	2–0	1–2	1–0	3–0	0–2		0–0	2–2
Valencia	2–0	3–1	1–0	3–4	5–0	1–1	3–0	2–0	2–1	3–1	1–0	5–0	1–2	3–0	1–0	1–1	2–0	2–1		0–1
Zaragoza	0–1	0–3	1–0	1–6	0–0	0–0	0–2	2–1	1–1	3–2	2–0	2–1	0–1	1–0	1–1	2–1	1–1	2–2	2–1	

Updated to match(es) played on unknown. Source: LFP (in Spanish)
Legend: Blue = home team win; Yellow = draw; Red = away team win.

== Relegation playoff ==
Team 1	Agg.	Team 2	1st leg	2nd leg
RCD Español	0–1	Racing de Santander	0–1	0–0
RCD Mallorca	3–4	Albacete Balompié	1–3	2–1

=== First leg ===
23 June 1993	RCD Español	0–1	Racing de Santander	Barcelona
20:30		Report (in Spanish)	Pineda 48'	Stadium: Sarrià; Attendance: 15,000; Referee: Manuel Díaz Vega (Asturias)

23 June 1993	RCD Mallorca	1–3	Albacete Balompié	Palma de Mallorca
21:30	Milojević 61'	Report (in Spanish)	Menéndez 28'; Pinilla 44'; Antonio 59'	Stadium: Lluís Sitjar; Attendance: 28,000; Referee: José María García-Aranda (Community of Madrid)

=== Second leg ===
29 June 1993	Racing de Santander	0–0 (1–0 agg.)	RCD Español	Santander
21:15		Report (in Spanish)		Stadium: El Sardinero; Attendance: 33,000; Referee: Antonio Jesús López Nieto (Andalusia)

30 June 1993	Albacete Balompié	1–2 (4–3 agg.)	RCD Mallorca	Albacete
21:15	Antonio 45'	Report (in Spanish)	Luis Delgado 14'; Bogdanović 21'	Stadium: Carlos Belmonte; Attendance: 17,000; Referee: Juan Manuel Brito Arceo (Canary Islands)

== Controversy ==
In the 1992–93 La Liga season, the late Rayo Vallecano goalkeeper Wilfred Agbonavbare was target of racist abuse from Real Madrid fans, such as chants as Negro, cabrón, recoge el algodón! ("Nigger, motherfucker, go to pick some cotton!") and a middle-aged man from Madrid saying on live TV that "that fucking nigger from Rayo" and the referee Juan Andújar Oliver were to blame for Real Madrid's defeat, much to the amusement of the teenage fans who shouted "Ku Klux Klan". In the same live TV report, a 13-year old Real Madrid fan took furiously the microphone and spat, making a verbal threat to the Nigerian goalkeeper saying "Sunday we'll go to beat to death the nigger, that son of a bitch, in Vallecas". When asked about the abuse suffered, Wilfred stated "That's normal, I am dark-skinned and having made many saves, I expected people to shout at me. But i am a footballer and this is nothing, i am very focused on [playing] my match". The Bukaneros, a far-left ultras group from Rayo Vallecano, dedicated to Wilfred a graffiti with the dedication "For your defense of the Sash against racism, we will not forget you".

== Top goalscorers ==
Rank	Player	Club	Goals
1	(Brazil) Bebeto	Deportivo La Coruña	29
2	(Chile) Iván Zamorano	Real Madrid	26
3	(Bulgaria) Lyuboslav Penev	Valencia	20
3	(Bulgaria) Hristo Stoichkov	Barcelona	20
5	(Mexico) Luis García	Atlético Madrid	17
5	(Spain) José Ángel Ziganda	Athletic Bilbao	17
7	(Spain) Txiki Begiristain	Barcelona	15
7	(Spain) Carlos	Oviedo	15
7	(Argentina) Juan Antonio Pizzi	Tenerife	15
10	(Austria) Toni Polster	Rayo Vallecano	14

== Attendances ==
#	Club	Avg. attendance	Highest
1	FC Barcelona	79,895	105,000
2	Real Madrid	72,789	100,000
3	Valencia CF	40,263	47,000
4	Sevilla FC	39,368	65,000
5	Athletic Club	36,000	47,000
6	RCD Espanyol	26,779	43,800
7	Atlético de Madrid	25,000	55,000
8	Deportivo de La Coruña	23,895	30,000
9	Celta de Vigo	21,842	30,000
10	CD Tenerife	21,684	30,000
11	Real Zaragoza	21,632	30,000
12	Real Sporting	16,486	30,000
13	Real Oviedo	16,466	21,200
14	Real Sociedad	14,745	25,000
15	CA Osasuna	14,659	28,000
16	Albacete Balompié	12,158	17,000
17	Cádiz CF	11,632	24,000
18	Rayo Vallecano	10,947	20,000
19	CD Logroñés	8,763	15,000
20	Burgos CF	8,658	12,000
