= 1993–94 Segunda División =

63rd season of the second-tier football league in Spain

Segunda División
- Season: 1993–94
- Champions: RCD Espanyol
- Promoted: RCD Espanyol; Real Betis; SD Compostela
- Relegated: CD Castellón; Real Murcia; Real Burgos CF; Cádiz CF
- Matches: 380
- Goals: 920 (2.42 per match)
- Top goalscorer: (Argentina) Daniel Aquino

The 1993–94 Segunda División season saw 20 teams participate in the second flight Spanish league. RCD Espanyol won the league.

Espanyol, Real Betis and SD Compostela were promoted to the Primera División. CD Castellón, Real Murcia, Real Burgos and Cádiz CF were relegated to Segunda División B.

== Teams ==
Location of teams in Segunda División 1993-94

Team	Home city	Stadium
Athletic Bilbao B	Bilbao	San Mamés
Badajoz	Badajoz	El Vivero
Barcelona B	Barcelona	Mini Estadi
Real Betis	Seville	Benito Villamarín
Real Burgos	Burgos	El Plantío
Cádiz	Cádiz	Ramón de Carranza
Castellón	Castellón de la Plana	Nou Castàlia
Compostela	Santiago de Compostela	San Lázaro
Eibar	Eibar	Ipurua
Español	Barcelona	Sarrià
Hércules	Alicante	José Rico Pérez
Leganés	Leganés	Luis Rodríguez de Miguel
Mallorca	Mallorca	Lluís Sitjar
Atlético Marbella	Marbella	Municipal de Marbella
Mérida	Mérida	Municipal de Mérida
Murcia	Murcia	La Condomina
Palamós	Palamós	Nou Municipal
Real Madrid B	Madrid	Ciudad Deportiva
Toledo	Toledo	Salto del Caballo
Villarreal	Villarreal	El Madrigal

=== Teams by Autonomous Community ===
	Autonomous community	Number of teams	Teams
1	Catalonia	3	Barcelona B, Palamós, Español
2	Andalusia	3	Marbella, Betis, Cádiz
2	Valencia	3	Hércules, Villarreal, Castellón
4	(Basque Country (autonomous community)) Basque Country	2	Athletic Bilbao B, Eibar
4	Extremadura	2	Badajoz, Extremadura, Mérida
4	Madrid	2	Leganés, Real Madrid B
7	Balearic Islands	1	Mallorca
7	Castile and León	1	Real Burgos
7	Castile-La Mancha	1	Toledo
7	Galicia	1	Compostela

== Final table ==
Pos	Team	Pld	W	D	L	GF	GA	GD	Pts	Promotion or relegation
1	RCD Español	38	20	12	6	59	25	+34	52	Promoted to Primera División
2	Real Betis	38	22	7	9	66	38	+28	51	Promoted to Primera División
3	SD Compostela	38	21	7	10	56	36	+20	49	Promotion playoff
4	CD Toledo	38	18	11	9	50	32	+18	47	Promotion playoff
5	RCD Mallorca	38	20	7	11	66	39	+27	47	
6	Real Madrid B	38	19	8	11	57	41	+16	46	
7	Hércules CF	38	16	12	10	41	35	+6	44	
8	Barcelona B	38	11	17	10	59	51	+8	39	
9	CP Mérida	38	12	13	13	47	41	+6	37	
10	SD Eibar	38	10	15	13	30	40	−10	35	
11	CD Badajoz	38	12	11	15	45	46	−1	35	
12	Atlético Marbella	38	10	15	13	40	41	−1	35	
13	Palamós CF	38	11	12	15	40	49	−9	34	
14	Athletic de Bilbao B	38	10	14	14	46	52	−6	34	
15	CD Leganés	38	11	12	15	53	59	−6	34	
16	Villarreal CF	38	14	6	18	29	48	−19	34	
17	CD Castellón	38	9	14	15	30	48	−18	32	Relegated to Segunda División B
18	Real Murcia	38	10	11	17	40	64	−24	31	Relegated to Segunda División B
19	Real Burgos (Note: Real Burgos was relegated to Tercera División for not paying its players, but was not allowed to compete.)	38	10	6	22	38	68	−30	26	Relegated to Segunda División B
20	Cádiz CF	38	4	10	24	28	67	−39	18	Relegated to Segunda División B

Source: BDFutbol

== Results ==
Home \ Away	ATH	BAD	BAR	BET	BUR	CÁD	CAS	COM	EIB	ESP	HÉR	LEG	MLL	MAR	MÉR	MUR	PAL	RMC	TOL	VIL
Athletic B	—	0–1	4–2	2–0	2–1	1–1	0–1	1–0	1–1	1–2	0–1	4–1	0–1	0–0	1–1	1–1	2–2	0–1	1–1	4–0
Badajoz	0–1	—	0–2	0–1	5–1	2–2	2–2	0–1	0–1	1–1	1–1	1–5	1–2	2–0	2–0	2–0	3–2	2–1	2–0	2–0
Barcelona B	4–0	1–1	—	2–2	3–0	6–0	2–2	0–0	2–2	1–2	0–0	1–0	0–2	0–0	2–2	3–1	1–0	1–1	0–1	1–0
Betis	2–1	4–1	4–0	—	1–0	3–0	2–0	3–2	3–0	2–1	2–1	2–0	3–1	5–2	2–0	4–1	1–2	3–0	1–1	1–0
Burgos	3–1	2–0	1–4	0–2	—	2–1	1–0	3–1	5–0	1–1	2–0	1–1	1–2	2–1	1–2	2–0	1–0	1–3	1–2	0–1
Cádiz	1–1	0–2	1–1	0–2	2–1	—	4–0	0–2	0–0	0–0	1–2	1–2	1–2	2–1	2–4	0–1	0–1	1–1	0–0	0–1
Castellón	1–1	0–0	1–2	1–1	0–0	4–0	—	1–2	1–0	0–5	2–1	0–2	1–1	0–2	0–0	0–0	0–3	3–1	1–2	0–2
Compostela	1–3	1–0	2–2	0–0	3–0	0–0	2–0	—	2–1	3–0	1–1	2–1	3–1	1–0	1–0	4–0	2–1	2–0	3–2	2–0
Eibar	1–1	2–0	1–1	0–0	3–0	2–1	3–1	0–1	—	0–1	1–1	2–2	2–1	1–0	0–1	1–0	2–0	0–0	1–0	0–0
Español	0–1	2–1	2–2	4–2	3–0	4–0	0–0	2–0	0–0	—	1–1	3–0	0–0	1–0	3–0	2–0	1–1	1–2	3–0	1–0
Hércules	1–1	2–0	2–1	2–0	3–0	3–2	0–0	2–0	0–0	2–1	—	0–2	0–4	1–1	1–1	2–0	1–0	1–0	0–1	4–0
Leganés	2–1	2–6	2–2	1–2	3–0	1–0	1–1	0–2	2–0	2–1	2–0	—	1–1	1–1	1–1	1–2	0–2	2–2	2–2	1–1
Mallorca	2–3	3–0	2–2	2–0	1–0	4–0	0–1	3–2	4–0	1–1	3–0	1–1	—	1–1	2–1	4–0	2–0	3–1	2–3	2–0
Marbella	2–0	0–0	3–0	2–2	2–0	0–2	1–1	2–2	1–1	0–1	0–1	2–1	2–0	—	1–1	1–1	1–0	3–3	1–0	2–0
Mérida	2–2	1–1	2–0	3–1	5–0	4–0	0–2	1–2	2–0	0–1	1–0	1–1	1–0	1–2	—	2–0	1–0	2–2	1–2	0–1
Murcia	1–1	2–2	2–5	1–0	3–1	2–1	3–0	2–1	1–1	1–1	0–0	3–2	3–4	1–1	1–1	—	3–2	0–1	0–1	3–1
Palamós	2–1	0–2	1–1	1–1	3–3	1–1	0–0	0–0	1–0	0–0	0–0	3–2	0–2	1–0	0–0	1–1	—	1–0	1–0	5–2
R. Madrid B	4–1	1–0	3–1	0–1	4–1	2–1	0–2	0–1	0–0	0–3	3–1	2–0	2–0	3–1	2–1	2–0	4–0	—	2–0	3–1
Toledo	4–0	0–0	0–0	2–0	0–0	1–0	2–0	1–0	2–1	0–1	1–2	3–1	1–0	1–1	1–1	5–0	5–2	0–0	—	3–1
Villarreal	1–1	0–0	2–1	2–1	0–0	1–0	0–1	3–2	2–0	0–3	0–1	0–2	1–0	1–0	1–0	1–0	3–1	0–1	0–0	—

Source: BDFutbol
Legend: Blue = home team win; Yellow = draw; Red = away team win.

== Promotion playoff ==
Team 1	Agg.	Team 2	1st leg	2nd leg
Rayo Vallecano	1–1	SD Compostela	1–1	0–0
CD Toledo	1–4	Real Valladolid	1–0	0–4

- Tiebreak

Team 1	Score	Team 2
Rayo Vallecano	1–3	SD Compostela

=== First leg ===
22 May 1994	Rayo Vallecano	1–1	SD Compostela	Madrid
12:00	Urzaiz 44'	Report (in Spanish)	Ohen 31'	Stadium: Vallecas; Attendance: 14,000; Referee: Juan Ansuátegui Roca (Valencian Community)

22 May 1994	CD Toledo	1–0	Real Valladolid	Toledo
20:00	Paniagua 64'	Report (in Spanish)		Stadium: Salto del Caballo; Attendance: 5,000; Referee: José María García-Aranda (Community of Madrid)

=== Second leg ===
28 May 1994	SD Compostela	0–0 (1–1 agg.)	Rayo Vallecano	Santiago de Compostela
20:30		Report (in Spanish)		Stadium: San Lázaro; Attendance: 12,000; Referee: José Enrique Rubio Valdivieso (Castile and León)

29 May 1994	Real Valladolid	4–0 (4–1 agg.)	CD Toledo	Valladolid
19:00	Chuchi Macón 3'; Juli 45'; Amavisca 80', 85'	Report (in Spanish)		Stadium: José Zorrilla; Attendance: 26,000; Referee: Juan Manuel Brito Arceo (Canary Islands)

=== Tiebreak ===
1 June 1994	SD Compostela	3–1	Rayo Vallecano	Oviedo
21:00	Ohen 16', 53'; José 88'	Report (in Spanish)	Višnjić 56'	Stadium: Carlos Tartiere; Attendance: 13,000; Referee: Manuel Díaz Vega (Asturias)
