= 1986–87 Segunda División B =

Season of third division football in Spain

Segunda División B
- Season: 1986–87
- Champions: Tenerife
- Promoted: Granada; Lleida; Real Burgos; Tenerife
- Relegated: Mallorca Atlético
- Matches: 462
- Goals: 1,068 (2.31 per match)
- Top goalscorer: Manolo Muñoz (30 goals)
- Best goalkeeper: Miguel Bastón (0.48 goals/match)
- Biggest home win: Real Burgos 7–0 Ceuta (5 October 1986); Salamanca 8–1 Alzira (31 May 1987)
- Biggest away win: Mallorca Atlético 0–5 Lleida (24 May 1987)
- Highest scoring: Salamanca 8–1 Alzira (31 May 1987)

The 1986–87 Segunda División B season was the 10th since its establishment. The first matches of the season were played on 30 August 1986, and the season ended on 14 June 1987.

Unlike the previous seasons, the division consisted of a single group instead of two geographically-defined groups. CD Tenerife were the champions.

== Overview before the season ==
22 teams joined the league, including four relegated from the 1985–86 Segunda División and 6 promoted from the 1985–86 Tercera División.

Relegated from Segunda División

- Albacete
- Deportivo Aragón
- Tenerife
- Atlético Madrid B

Promoted from Tercera División

- Lugo
- Mallorca Atlético
- Polideportivo Almería
- Gandía
- Alzira
- Eibar

== Teams ==
Location of teams in Segunda División B 1986–87
Canary Islands

Team	Founded	Home city	Stadium
Albacete	1940	Albacete, Castilla–La Mancha	Carlos Belmonte
Alcoyano	1928	Alcoy, Valencian Community	El Collao
Polideportivo Almería	1983	Almería, Andalusia	Municipal
Alzira	1946	Alzira, Valencian Community	Luis Suñer Picó
Atlético Madrileño	1969	Madrid, Madrid	Vicente Calderón
Real Burgos	1983	Burgos	El Plantío
Ceuta	1970	Ceuta	Alfonso Murube
Córdoba	1954	Córdoba, Andalusia	El Arcángel
Deportivo Aragón	1958	Zaragoza, Aragon	Ciudad Deportiva del Real Zaragoza
Eibar	1940	Eibar, Basque Country	Ipurua
Gandía	1947	Gandia, Valencian Community	Guillermo Olagüe
Granada	1931	Granada	Los Cármenes
Lleida	1939	Lleida	Camp d'Esports
Linense	1912	La Línea de la Concepción, Andalusia	Municipal La Línea de la Concepción
Lugo	1953	Lugo, Galicia	Anxo Carro
Mallorca Atlético	1967	Palma, Balearic Islands	Lluís Sitjar
Orense	1952	Ourense, Galicia	O Couto
Poblense	1935	Sa Pobla, Balearic Islands	Nou Camp Sa Pobla
Pontevedra	1941	Pontevedra, Galicia	Pasarón
Salamanca	1923	Salamanca, Castile and León	Helmántico
San Sebastián	1951	San Sebastián, Basque Country	Atotxa
Tenerife	1912	Santa Cruz de Tenerife, Canary Islands	Heliodoro Rodríguez López

== League table ==
Pos	Team	Pld	W	D	L	GF	GA	GD	Pts	Qualification or relegation
1	Tenerife	42	21	17	4	70	33	+37	59	Promotion to Segunda División
2	Lleida	42	23	11	8	71	32	+39	57	Promotion to Segunda División
3	Granada	42	22	12	8	55	39	+16	56	Promotion to Segunda División
4	Real Burgos	42	19	16	7	45	20	+25	54	Promotion to Segunda División
5	Salamanca	42	17	19	6	60	34	+26	53	
6	Pontevedra	42	19	9	14	44	38	+6	47 (Note: Pontevedra finished ahead of Eibar on head-to-head points: Eibar–Pontevedra 1–1, Pontevedra–Eibar 2–0)	
7	Eibar	42	18	11	13	55	33	+22	47	
8	Linense	42	19	6	17	43	36	+7	44	
9	Córdoba	42	15	12	15	53	59	−6	42	
10	Alzira	42	13	15	14	41	56	−15	41	
11	Lugo	42	14	12	16	44	51	−7	40 (Note: Lugo finished ahead of Alcoyano and Ourense on head-to-head points: Lugo 8 pts, Alcoyano 4 pts, Ourense 0 pts)	
12	Alcoyano	42	16	8	18	56	65	−9	40	
13	Ourense	42	14	12	16	44	42	+2	40	
14	Atlético Madrileño	42	11	17	14	50	47	+3	39	
15	San Sebastián	42	12	14	16	60	63	−3	38 (Note: Real Sociedad B finished ahead of Gandía on head-to-head points: Gandía–Real Sociedad B 1–1, Real Sociedad B–Gandía 3–2)	
16	Gandía	42	12	14	16	49	51	−2	38	
17	Albacete	42	13	11	18	41	45	−4	37	
18	Deportivo Aragón	42	14	8	20	35	50	−15	36	
19	Ceuta	42	11	12	19	42	60	−18	34	
20	Polideportivo Almería	42	9	13	20	38	60	−22	31	
21	Mallorca Atlético (Note: Mallorca B renounced to stay on Segunda División B at the end of the season)	42	7	12	23	35	70	−35	26	Relegation to Tercera División
22	Poblense	42	8	9	25	37	84	−47	25	

Source: BDFútbol
Rules for classification: 1) points; 2) head-to-head points; 3) head-to-head goal difference; 4) goal difference; 5) number of goals scored

== Results ==
Home \ Away	ALB	ALC	ALM	ALZ	ATM	BUR	CEU	COR	DAR	EIB	GAN	GRA	LLE	LNS	LUG	MAL	ORE	POB	PNT	SAL	SSE	TEN
Albacete	—	3–1	1–0	1–1	1–0	0–1	1–1	1–0	1–2	1–0	0–1	2–2	2–2	1–0	2–1	1–1	1–0	3–1	1–0	0–0	4–0	0–1
Alcoyano	2–1	—	2–2	2–3	2–1	0–1	5–0	4–2	2–0	0–0	1–1	2–3	2–1	1–0	0–1	2–1	2–1	2–1	0–0	2–3	2–0	0–0
Poli Almería	1–1	3–3	—	1–1	2–1	1–0	0–2	0–3	1–0	0–0	2–4	1–0	0–2	1–0	1–0	1–1	1–1	0–2	1–1	0–0	2–1	1–1
Alzira	1–0	3–1	0–1	—	1–1	0–0	1–0	1–2	0–0	1–2	1–0	2–3	0–0	1–0	1–1	2–0	1–0	1–1	0–0	0–1	0–1	2–2
At. Madrileño	0–0	4–0	0–0	1–1	—	1–0	2–2	3–0	1–1	1–4	1–0	5–2	3–2	3–1	1–1	3–0	0–0	3–1	0–1	0–0	2–2	0–0
Real Burgos	1–0	3–0	1–0	0–0	1–1	—	7–0	0–0	0–0	0–0	2–0	0–1	2–1	2–0	2–0	3–0	0–0	2–0	1–0	0–0	0–1	1–1
Ceuta	2–1	2–3	0–1	0–1	0–0	3–0	—	1–1	2–0	2–1	4–1	0–1	0–0	1–0	3–0	1–1	1–0	2–2	4–1	1–2	0–3	1–1
Córdoba	3–2	2–0	4–4	2–2	1–1	1–1	1–0	—	1–2	1–0	1–1	1–1	3–2	0–1	3–2	3–1	2–1	1–1	4–2	0–2	2–1	3–1
Dep. Aragón	1–1	0–1	2–0	0–1	0–0	0–1	0–1	0–1	—	2–0	2–0	0–2	1–3	1–2	2–0	3–2	1–0	1–0	2–1	1–1	0–2	2–2
Eibar	3–0	1–0	0–0	5–1	2–0	0–1	2–0	2–0	4–0	—	1–0	2–0	0–1	2–0	3–0	2–0	0–1	4–0	1–1	1–2	3–3	1–1
Gandía	0–1	1–1	1–0	2–0	1–0	1–1	0–0	3–2	3–1	0–0	—	3–0	1–0	2–2	0–1	1–1	2–2	2–1	0–1	0–0	1–1	1–1
Granada	2–0	3–1	2–0	0–1	1–0	1–1	0–0	1–0	3–1	2–0	0–0	—	1–0	1–0	2–0	3–2	2–1	1–1	1–0	0–0	1–1	1–0
Lleida	2–0	4–1	2–0	3–3	1–2	2–1	4–1	5–0	2–1	4–1	1–1	2–0	—	1–0	2–1	3–0	0–0	3–0	1–0	0–0	2–1	2–1
Linense	2–1	1–0	3–1	2–0	1–0	00	2–0	0–0	0–1	1–0	2–1	0–0	0–1	—	1–0	2–1	3–1	3–1	1–0	3–1	1–0	0–1
Lugo	2–1	1–0	2–1	3–1	2–2	2–1	2–2	0–0	1–2	1–2	3–2	0–0	0–0	2–1	—	0–0	2–1	4–2	0–0	1–0	2–2	0–1
Mallorca At.	0–0	3–0	1–0	1–2	0–2	0–1	1–0	0–0	1–0	0–1	2–1	2–3	0–5	1–2	0–0	—	1–1	1–2	1–3	1–2	1–0	1–1
Orense	1–1	1–2	3–1	2–0	3–1	0–1	2–1	1–0	1–0	0–2	3–0	1–1	1–0	0–3	0–1	0–0	—	4–0	1–0	2–1	1–0	1–1
Poblense	0–2	3–2	2–1	1–0	1–0	0–2	1–0	0–2	0–1	0–0	2–6	1–3	1–2	0–0	1–1	2–4	0–2	—	0–1	0–2	2–1	2–2
Pontevedra	2–1	1–2	2–1	1–3	1–0	1–1	1–0	2–0	0–0	2–0	0–2	3–1	1–1	1–0	1–0	1–0	1–0	3–0	—	2–0	2–1	3–1
Salamanca	2–1	1–1	3–2	8–1	2–2	1–2	1–1	3–0	3–0	1–1	2–1	0–2	0–0	1–1	2–0	1–1	0–0	4–0	3–1	—	3–1	0–0
San Sebastián	1–0	1–2	3–2	0–0	3–1	0–0	4–1	3–1	0–1	2–2	3–2	1–1	0–2	3–2	1–3	5–0	3–3	2–2	0–0	1–1	—	1–1
Tenerife	2–0	2–0	2–1	5–0	3–1	1–1	3–0	1–0	3–1	1–0	2–0	2–1	0–0	1–0	2–1	5–1	3–1	4–0	2–0	1–1	5–1	—

Source: BDFútbol
Legend: Blue = home team win; Yellow = draw; Red = away team win.

== Top goalscorers ==
Goalscorers	Goals	Team
(Spain) Manolo Muñoz	30	Granada
(Spain) Jon Igoa	20	Real Sociedad B
(Spain) Julio Suárez	17	Tenerife
(Spain) Víctor Brito	17	Tenerife
(Spain) Mariano Mansilla	16	Córdoba

== Top goalkeepers ==
Goalkeeper	Goals	Matches	Average	Team
(Spain) Miguel Bastón	20	42	0.48	Real Burgos
(Spain) Rafael Arumí	20	28	0.71	Lleida
(Spain) Peio Aguirreoa	33	42	0.79	Tenerife
(Spain) José Garmendia	33	42	0.79	Eibar
(Spain) Ángel Lozano	34	42	0.81	Salamanca
