= Rubio =

Rubio (Spanish for blond) may refer to:

== People ==
- Rubio (surname)
  - Marco Rubio, 72nd U.S. Secretary of State (2025–present)
- Rubio (footballer, born 1976), Spanish football player and manager
- Rubio (footballer, born 1981), Spanish football midfielder
- Rubio (footballer, born 1995), Spanish football forward

== Places ==
- Rubio, Iowa, American unincorporated community
- Rubio, Venezuela, Venezuelan town
- El Rubio, Seville, Spain, Spanish town

== Other uses ==
- Rubio (horse), a racehorse

== See also ==
- Álex Rubio
