= Antonio David =

Antonio David may refer to:

- Antonio David (footballer, born 2004), Romanian football defender
- Antonio David (footballer, born 2005), Spanish football midfielder
- Antonio David (painter), Italian painter
