= Alberto Morientes =

Spanish footballer (born 2006)

Personal information
- Full name: Alberto Morientes Palencia
- Date of birth: 14 November 2006 (age 19)
- Place of birth: Sonseca, Spain
- Height: 1.78 m (5 ft 10 in)
- Position: Attacking midfielder

Team information
- Current team: Albacete B
- Number: 22

Youth career
- Sonseca
- 2022–2024: Albacete

Senior career*
Years	Team	Apps	(Gls)
2025–	Albacete B	32	(5)
2025–	Albacete	1	(0)
- * Club domestic league appearances and goals as of 10 May 2026

Alberto Morientes Palencia (born 14 November 2006) is a Spanish footballer who plays as an attacking midfielder for Atlético Albacete.

== Career ==
Born in Sonseca, Toledo, Castilla–La Mancha, Morientes joined Albacete Balompié's youth sides in 2022, from hometown club CD Sonseca. After scoring in a regular basis for the youth categories, he was promoted to the reserves ahead of the 2025–26 season, in Tercera Federación, and made his senior debut on 6 September by coming on as a second-half substitute in a 3–1 away win over Calvo Sotelo Puertollano CF.

Morientes scored his first senior goal on 12 October 2025, netting the B's opener in a 2–1 home win over CD Marchamalo. He made his first team debut on 21 November, replacing Dani Escriche late into a 2–1 Segunda División away loss to UD Las Palmas; by doing so, he repeated the feat of his uncle 32 years later.

== Personal life ==
Morientes' uncle Fernando was also a footballer. Also a striker, he too was part of the youth academy at Albacete.
