= José Luis Manzanedo =

Spanish footballer (born 1956)

Personal information
- Full name: José Luis Fernández Manzanedo
- Date of birth: 20 February 1956 (age 70)
- Place of birth: Burgos, Spain
- Height: 1.83 m (6 ft 0 in)
- Position: Goalkeeper

Senior career*
| Years | Team | Apps | (Gls) |
| 1973–1977 | Burgos | 60 | (0) |
| 1977–1984 | Valencia | 80 | (0) |
| 1985–1986 | Valladolid | 0 | (0) |
| 1986–1989 | Sabadell | 76 | (0) |
| 1989–1992 | Cultural Leonesa | 114 | (0) |
| Total | | 330 | (0) |

International career
| 1977 | Spain U21 | 2 | (0) |
| 1979 | Spain U23 | 2 | (0) |
| 1977 | Spain | 1 | (0) |

Managerial career
- 1993: Real Burgos (caretaker)
- 1994: Real Burgos (caretaker)
- 1995–1996: Palencia
- * Club domestic league appearances and goals

José Luis Fernández Manzanedo (born 20 February 1956) is a Spanish former professional footballer who played as a goalkeeper.

He made 161 La Liga appearances for Burgos, Valencia and Sabadell, over 12 years. With the second club, he won the Copa del Rey and UEFA Cup Winners' Cup in consecutive seasons, as well as the Ricardo Zamora Trophy for best goalkeeper in 1978–79. Having gone with the under-23 team to the 1976 Olympics, he played one game for Spain in 1977.

Manzanedo had brief stints as manager of Real Burgos in La Liga and the Segunda División in the early 1990s.

== Club career ==
=== Burgos ===
Born in Burgos in Castile and León, Manzanedo began his career at local Burgos CF. He made his professional debut aged 17 on 2 September 1973, as the Segunda División season began with a 2–0 loss at Rayo Vallecano. He became the regular goalkeeper in 1975–76, as the team won promotion to La Liga under manager Marcel Domingo and avoided relegation the following year.

=== Valencia ===
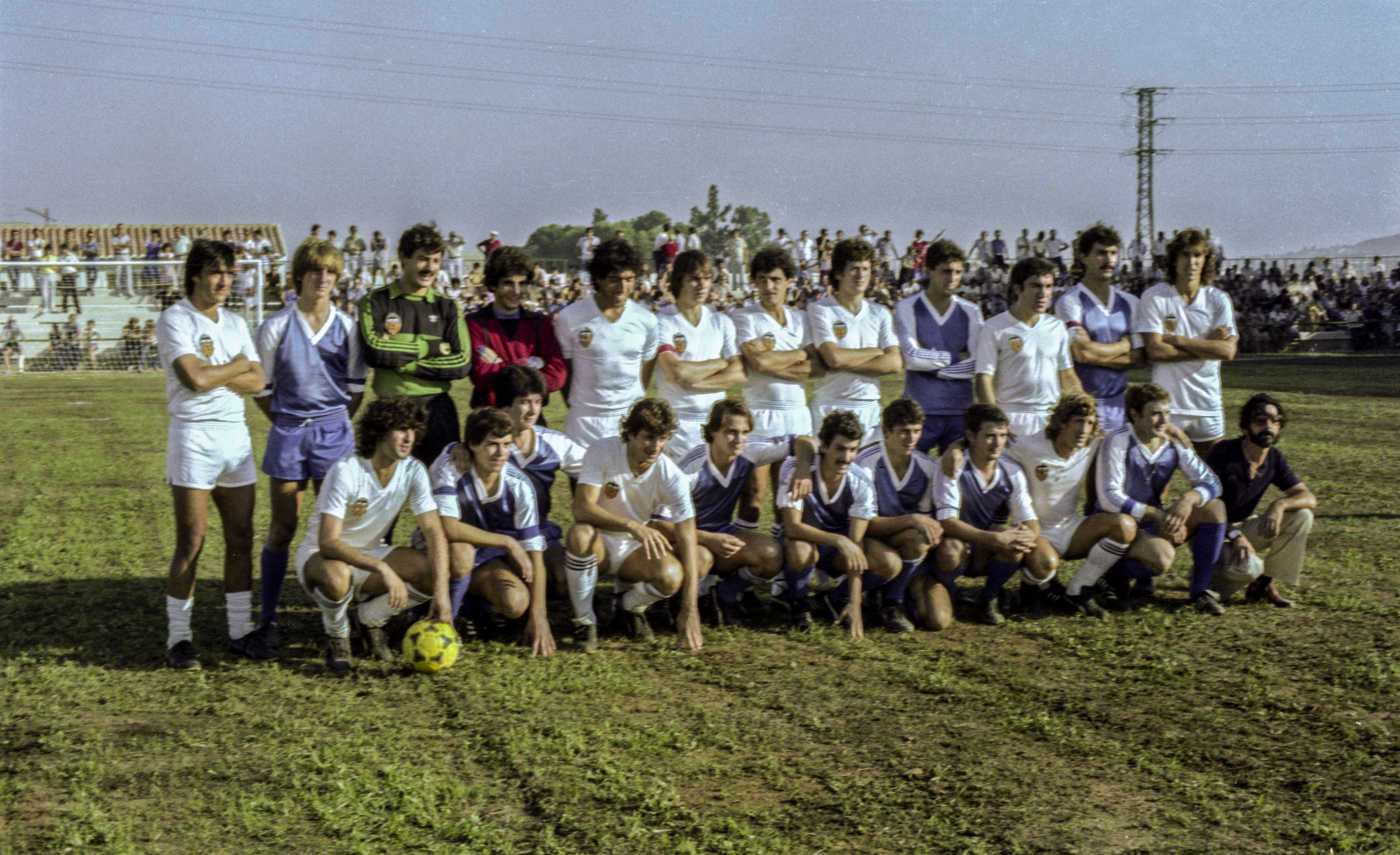
Manzanedo (back row, third from left, in black kit with green details) lining up for Valencia in August 1980.

In June 1977, Manzanedo was one of three players who followed Domingo to Valencia, having been tracked by Barcelona beforehand. He won the Ricardo Zamora Trophy for best goals conceded average in 1978–79. In the same season, he played six games and conceded once as Valencia won the Copa del Rey, beating Real Madrid 2–0 in the final.

Valencia won the UEFA Cup Winners' Cup in 1979–80, though Carlos Santiago Pereira was preferred in goal, with Manzanedo only playing a 3–1 win at Rangers in the last 16 second leg, and a 4–3 extra time win over Barcelona at the end of the next round.

=== Later career ===
Manzanedo was released from Valencia in 1984, alleging that he was waivered because the ownership wanted a squad of players from the Valencian Community. He did not register with a team for the following season, while he trained with Real Burgos, and in June 1985 he signed a one-year deal with Real Valladolid. He could not take the starting place from Argentine veteran Carlos Fenoy or the backup role from youngster Rodri, and played only once in a first-round cup game away to neighbours Cultural Leonesa on 16 September (5–0 win).

In July 1986, Manzanedo was in advanced talks with Rayo Vallecano before signing a one-year deal at Sabadell. He played there for three years, the last of which in the second division, before signing for Cultural where he ended his career in Segunda División B.

== International career ==
Manzanedo played for Spain at under-21 and under-23 level. With the latter, he was chosen for the 1976 Olympic event in Canada.

Manzanedo earned his only cap for the senior team on 21 September 1977. With the team losing 1–0 at half time in a friendly in Bern against Switzerland, he replaced Luis Arconada in a 2–1 win.

== Managerial career ==
Real Burgos manager Monchu resigned in March 1993. Manzanedo led the team in a 2–0 home loss on 25 March to an Atlético Madrid side led by another temporary manager, Iselín Santos Ovejero. On 4 April, Manzanedo was in charge for a 1–1 draw with Valencia also at Estadio El Plantío, before the appointment of Miguel Sánchez.

Sánchez resigned in February 1994 from Real Burgos, now in the Segunda División, and Manzanedo replaced him. He lost all four of his games before the appointment of Luis María Astorga in another relegation season.

Manzanedo's only experience as a permanent manager was in Segunda División B with Palencia (1995–96).
