= Ginés Meléndez =

Spanish footballer and manager

Personal information
- Full name: Ginés Meléndez Sotos
- Date of birth: 22 March 1950 (age 76)
- Place of birth: Los Chospes, Robledo, Spain

Youth career
- Albacete

Senior career*
Years	Team	Apps	(Gls)
1967–1969	Albacete		
1969–1970	Almansa		
1970–1971	Quintanar del Rey		

Managerial career
- 19??–19??: Albacete (youth)
- 19??–19??: La Gineta
- 19??–19??: Albacete (youth)
- 19??–19??: Atlético Albacete
- 1992: Albacete (caretaker)
- 1993–1998: Albacete (assistant)
- 1994: Albacete (caretaker)
- 1998: Albacete
- 200?–200?: Castile-La Mancha
- 2003: Spain U20
- 2007: Spain U20
- 2004–2012: Spain U19
Medal record
Men's football
Representing Spain (as manager)
FIFA U-17 World Cup
Bronze medal – third place	2009
- * Club domestic league appearances and goals

Ginés Meléndez Sotos (born 22 March 1950) is a retired Spanish footballer and football manager.

== Football career ==
Ginés, stopped playing football with 21. He then studied as a coach, and began training the ranks at Albacete Balompié. He was for many years coordinator of Albacete in the youth system, as he combined with that of municipal councilor in Albacete. He was also a physical education teacher at a school in Albacete. In 1992 and 1994 coached a game in La Liga as caretaker manager. After years as coach and trainer of Albacete Balompié, in the 1997–98 season led the first team the last 5 round, getting the salvation of category.

After many years in Albacete Balompié got the call from Iñaki Sáez to join the technical staff of the youth ranks of the Spanish team. He has won numerous international competitions with the U17 and U19.
