= Francisco Leal =

Francisco Leal may refer to:

- Francisco Leal (canoeist) (born 1968), Spanish canoeist
- Francisco Leal (footballer) (born 1964), Spanish footballer
