= Rubio (surname) =

Rubio is a Spanish surname. Notable people with the surname include:

- Álvaro Rubio (born 1979), Spanish footballer
- Angel Rubio (American football) (born 1975), American professional football player
- Ángel Rubio (composer) (1846–1907), Spanish composer
- Ángel Rubio (physicist) (born 1965), Spanish theoretical physicist* Antoni Rubió i Lluch (1856–1937), Spanish-Catalan historian
- Antonio Rubio (born 1949), Spanish boxer
- Bobby Farlice-Rubio, Vermont politician
- Chris Rubio, American football trainer
- David Rubio (1934–2000), English instrument maker
- Diego Morcillo Rubio de Auñón (1642–1730), Spanish bishop
- Eduardo Rubio (born 1983), Chilean footballer
- Einer Rubio (born 1998), Colombian cyclist
- Eurípides Rubio (1938–1966), American officer
- Fanny Rubio (born 1949), Spanish academic
- Francisco Rubio (born 1953), French footballer
- Francisco Rubio (astronaut) (born 1975), American astronaut
- Francisco Rubio Llorente (1930–2016), Spanish jurist
- Gabriel Rubio (born 2003), American football player
- Gonzalo Rubio Orbe (1909–1994), Ecuadorian scholar
- Gwyn Hyman Rubio (born 1949), American author
- Hugo Eduardo Rubio (born 1960), Chilean footballer
- Ingrid Rubio (born 1975), Spanish actress
- Israel José Rubio (born 1981), Venezuelan weightlifter
- Javier Gómez Cifuentes Rubio (born 1981), Spanish footballer
- Jeanette Dousdebes Rubio, wife of Marco Rubio
- Jesús González Rubio (died 1874), Mexican music professor
- Joan Rubió (1870–1952), Spanish architect
- Joaquín Rubio y Muñoz (1788–1874), Spanish lawyer
- Jorge Rubio (baseball) (1945–2020), Mexican baseball player
- Jorge Rubio (boxing trainer), Cuban boxing trainer
- José González Rubio (1804–1875), Spanish-American friar
- José López Rubio (1903–1996), Spanish filmmaker
- José María Rubio (1864–1929), Spanish Jesuit
- Juan José León Rubio, Mexican politician
- Julio E. Rubio, Mexican researcher
- Kevin Rubio (born 1967), American filmmaker
- Luigi Rubio (died 1882), Italian painter
- Lydia Rubio Ferrer (born 1946), Cuban artist
- Marco Antonio Rubio (born 1980), Mexican boxer
- Marco Rubio (born 1971), American politician
- Mariano Rubio (1931–1999), Spanish economist
- Mario Martínez Rubio (born 1985), Spanish footballer
- Mariano Navarro Rubio (1913–2001), Spanish politician
- Matías Rubio (born 1988), Chilean footballer
- Michael Rubio (born 1977), American politician
- Miguel Ángel Rubio Buedo (born 1961), Spanish footballer
- Óscar Rubio Fauria (born 1984), Spanish footballer
- Óscar Rubio Ramos (born 1976), Spanish footballer
- Pascual Ortiz Rubio (1877–1963), Mexican politician
- Paulina Rubio (born 1971), Mexican singer
- Pilar Rubio (born 1978), Spanish TV presenter
- Rafaela Crespín Rubio (born 1976), Spanish politician
- Ricky Rubio (born 1990), Spanish basketball player
- Simón de Roxas Clemente y Rubio (1777–1827), Spanish botanist
- Waldo Rubio (born 1995), Spanish footballer

== See also ==
- Rubio (disambiguation)
