= Álex Rubio =

Álex Rubio may refer to:

- Álex Rubio (footballer, born 1993), Spanish footballer
- Álex Rubio (footballer, born 2002), Spanish footballer
- Alex Rubio (artist) (born 1968), American muralist, painter, and printmaker
