= Monchu (football manager) =

Spanish football manager (1941–2011)

Personal information
- Full name: José Ramón Pérez Rodríguez
- Date of birth: 24 May 1941
- Place of birth: Oviedo, Spain
- Date of death: 2 May 2011 (aged 69)
- Place of death: Oviedo, Spain

Managerial career
- Years: Team
- 1975–1976: Turón
- 1976–1979: Ibiza
- 1979–1980: Cacereño
- 1980–1982: San Fernando
- 1982–1983: Ibiza
- 1983–1984: Alcoyano
- 1984–1986: Xerez
- 1987–1988: Alcoyano
- 1988–1989: AD Ceuta FC
- 1989–1990: Hércules
- 1990–1991: Melilla
- 1992–1993: Real Burgos
- 1994–1995: Avilés Industrial
- 1997–1998: AD Ceuta

José Ramón Pérez Rodríguez (24 May 1941 – 2 May 2011), known as Monchu, was a Spanish football manager. His career was spent mostly at the lower levels, apart from a spell in the Segunda División with Xerez after winning the Segunda División B in 1986, and a brief spell at Real Burgos in La Liga in 1992–93.

== Career ==
Born in Oviedo in Asturias, Monchu began managing local Turón before moving to SD Ibiza, where he won promotion from the Tercera División in 1977–78. In 1985–86, he led Xerez to promotion to the Segunda División.

Monchu arrived at Real Burgos in 1991 as an assistant to José Manuel Novoa, and became secretary when the latter moved to Espanyol. He was assistant manager at the club in La Liga, when he succeeded the sacked Theo Vonk in December 1992. His debut on 20 December was a 3–0 loss away to his hometown club Real Oviedo. Having achieved only four draws in 12 games, he resigned in late March to be succeeded by his assistant José Luis Manzanedo.

Having previously managed the team in the late 1980s, Monchu returned to AD Ceuta from 1996 to 1998. He was then assistant to director of football Novoa at Sporting de Gijón in his native region, as well as their scout in South America.

== Death ==
Monchu was the founder and president of the club Juventud Asturiana, stepping down in 2010 due to illness. He died in his home city on 2 May 2011, aged 69. He had a wife and two sons.
