= Ricardo Zamora Trophy =

Spanish football award for goalkeepers

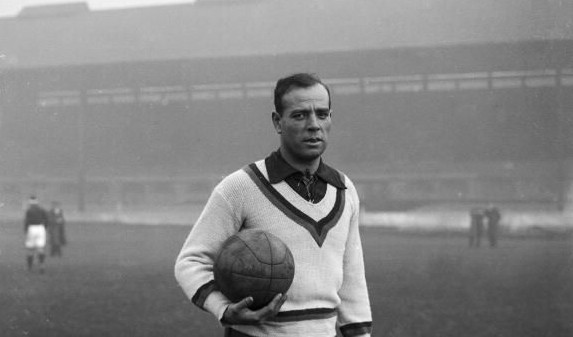
Spanish goalkeeper Ricardo Zamora is the trophy's namesake.

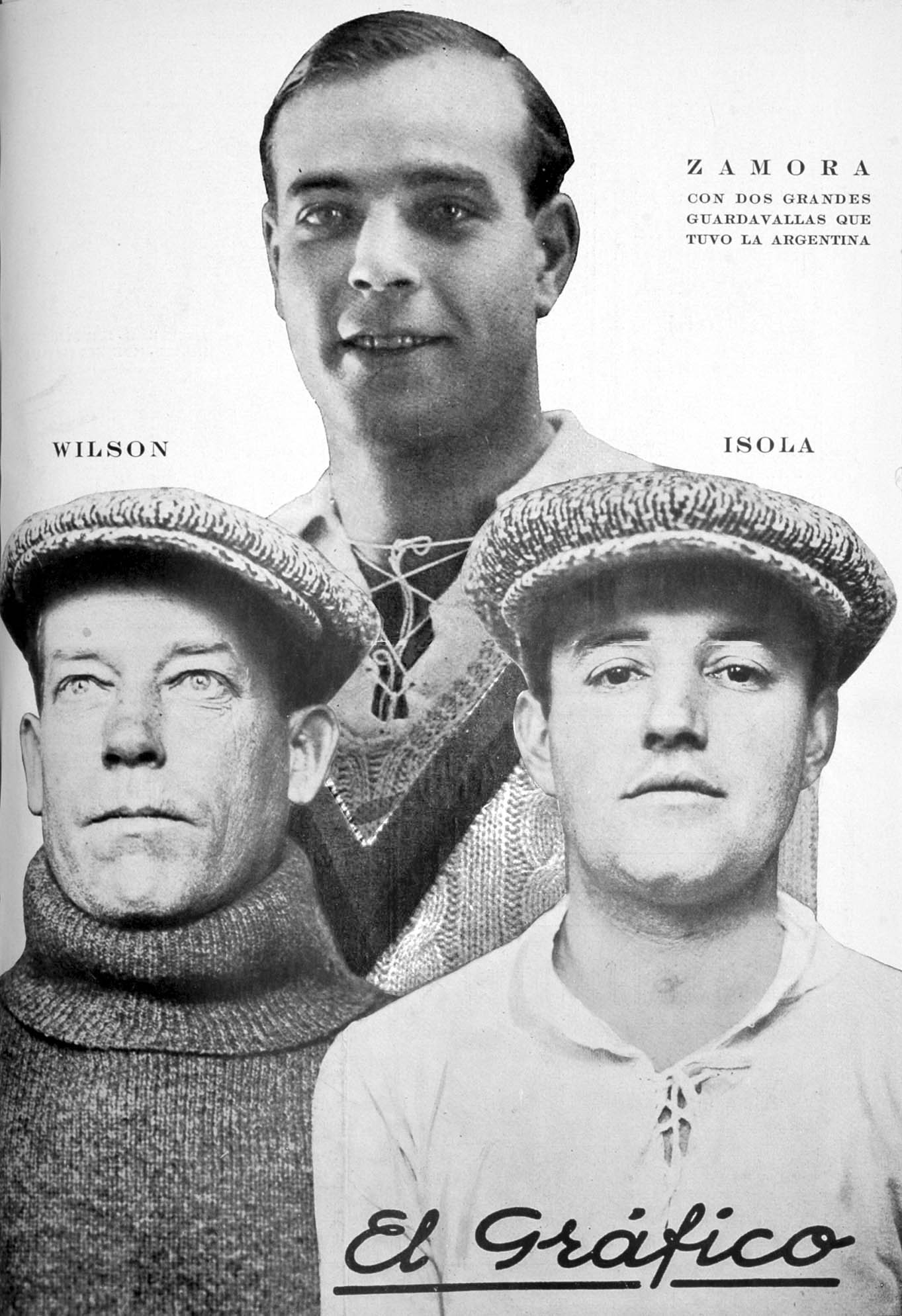
Ricardo Zamora, with two Argentine goalkeepers on the cover of El Gráfico in 1926

The Zamora Trophy (Spanish: Trofeo Ricardo Zamora) is a football award, established by Spanish newspaper Marca in 1958. The award goes to the goalkeeper who has the lowest "goals-to-games" ratio.

In the inaugural year of the award, the winning goalkeeper had to play at least 15 league matches in the current season. In 1964, the limit for matches a goalkeeper had to play was raised to 22. In 1983, it was raised to 28 matches, including the rule that the goalkeeper had to play at least 60 minutes in match for it to count.

In the last couple of years the list of goalkeepers who would have won the trophy prior to 1958 has been published. For these seasons, a limit of matches that the goalkeeper had to play has been applied. For the leagues with only 10 teams the limit of matches was 14, for those of 12 teams it was 17 and for those of 14 the limit was 20 matches. For those leagues of 16 teams it is 22 – as originally established for the trophy from 1964 to 1983.

== Rules ==
- For a goalkeeper to be eligible for the trophy he should play at least 28 matches, considered calculable, during the league season. For a match to be considered calculable the goalkeeper should play, at least, 60 minutes of said match.
- The winner shall be the goalkeeper who has the lowest coefficient, worked out to the second decimal place (hundredths). This is calculated by dividing all goals conceded in the league (including those matches which aren't calculable i.e. those in which the goalkeeper has played less than 60 minutes) by the total number of calculable matches.
- The trophy can be won by more than one goalkeeper if they have the same coefficient. In which case each goalkeeper shall be awarded a trophy.
- Each week MARCA shall publish a provisional league table. Until one or more goalkeepers reach the 28 calculable matches the league table shall reward those goalkeepers who have played the most calculable matches, and within those, the one who has the lowest coefficient.

== Primera División ==
=== Winners ===
Season	Player	Club	Matches played	Goals conceded	Coefficient
1929	(Spain) Ricardo Zamora	Espanyol	15	24	1.60
1929–30	(Spain) Gregorio Blasco	Athletic Bilbao	15	20	1.33
1930–31	(Spain) Tomás Zarraonaindia	Arenas Getxo	14	27	1.92
1931–32	(Second Spanish Republic) Ricardo Zamora	Real Madrid	17	15	0.88
1932–33	(Second Spanish Republic) Ricardo Zamora	Real Madrid	18	17	0.94
1933–34	(Second Spanish Republic) Gregorio Blasco	Athletic Bilbao	14	21	1.50
1934–35	(Second Spanish Republic) Joaquín Urquiaga	Real Betis	21	19	0.90
1935–36	(Second Spanish Republic) Gregorio Blasco	Athletic Bilbao	21	30	1.47
From 1936 to 1939 no league matches were played due to the Spanish Civil War.
1939–40	(Francoist Spain) Fernando Tabales	Atlético Madrid	21	29	1.38
1940–41	(Francoist Spain) José María Echevarría	Athletic Bilbao	18	21	1.16
1941–42	(Francoist Spain) Juan Acuña	Deportivo La Coruña	26	37	1.42
1942–43	(Francoist Spain) Juan Acuña	Deportivo La Coruña	25	31	1.24
1943–44	(Francoist Spain) Ignacio Eizaguirre	Valencia	26	32	1.23
1944–45	(Francoist Spain) Ignacio Eizaguirre	Valencia	22	28	1.27
1945–46	(Francoist Spain) José Bañón	Real Madrid	25	29	1.16
1946–47	(Francoist Spain) Raimundo Lezama	Athletic Bilbao	23	29	1.26
1947–48	(Francoist Spain) Juan Velasco	Barcelona	26	31	1.19
1948–49	(France) Marcel Domingo	Atlético Madrid	24	28	1.16
1949–50	(Francoist Spain) Juan Acuña	Deportivo La Coruña	22	29	1.31
1950–51	(Francoist Spain) Juan Acuña	Deportivo La Coruña	26	36	1.38
1951–52	(Francoist Spain) Antoni Ramallets	Barcelona	28	40	1.42
1952–53	(France) Marcel Domingo	Espanyol	27	34	1.25
1953–54	(Francoist Spain) Luis Menéndez Sánchez	Atlético Madrid	22	24	1.09
1954–55	(Francoist Spain) Juan Alonso	Real Madrid	24	24	1.00
1955–56	(Francoist Spain) Antoni Ramallets	Barcelona	29	24	0.82
1956–57	(Francoist Spain) Antoni Ramallets	Barcelona	29	35	1.20
1957–58	(Francoist Spain) Gregorio Vergel	Valencia	28	28	1.00
1958–59	(Francoist Spain) Antoni Ramallets	Barcelona	28	23	0.82
1959–60	(Francoist Spain) Antoni Ramallets	Barcelona	27	24	0.88
1960–61	(Francoist Spain) José Vicente Train	Real Madrid	30	25	0.83
1961–62	(Francoist Spain) José Araquistáin	Real Madrid	25	19	0.76
1962–63	(Francoist Spain) José Vicente Train	Real Madrid	27	26	0.96
1963–64	(Francoist Spain) José Vicente Train	Real Madrid	15	10	0.66
1964–65	(Francoist Spain) Antonio Betancort	Real Madrid	24	15	0.62
1965–66	(Francoist Spain) José Manuel Pesudo	Barcelona	22	15	0.68
1966–67	(Francoist Spain) Antonio Betancort	Real Madrid	22	15	0.68
1967–68	(Francoist Spain) Antonio Betancort	Real Madrid	22	19	0.86
1968–69	(Francoist Spain) Salvador Sadurní	Barcelona	30	18	0.60
1969–70	(Francoist Spain) José Ángel Iribar	Athletic Bilbao	30	20	0.66
1970–71	(Francoist Spain) Abelardo González	Valencia	30	19	0.63
1970–71	(Francoist Spain) Roberto Rodríguez Aguirre	Atlético Madrid	28	17	0.60
1971–72	(Francoist Spain) Juan Antonio Deusto	Málaga	28	23	0.82
1972–73	(Francoist Spain) Mariano García Remón	Real Madrid	27	20	0.74
1972–73	(Francoist Spain) Miguel Reina	Barcelona	34	21	0.66
1973–74	(Francoist Spain) Salvador Sadurni	Barcelona	30	22	0.73
1974–75 (Note: Due to an error in the application of the rules, the Argentine goalkeeper Jorge D'Alessandro — who was the rightful winner of the trophy — did not receive this award at the time. It was finally officially awarded to him in 2019.)	(Francoist Spain) Salvador Sadurni	Barcelona	24	19	0.79
1974–75	(Argentina) Jorge D'Alessandro	Salamanca	34	29	0.85
1975–76	(Francoist Spain) Miguel Ángel González	Real Madrid	32	23	0.71
1976–77	(Francoist Spain) Miguel Reina	Atlético Madrid	30	29	0.96
1976–77	(Argentina) Jorge D'Alessandro	Salamanca	31	30	0.97
1977–78	(Francoist Spain) Pedro María Artola	Barcelona	28	23	0.82
1978–79	(Francoist Spain) José Luis Manzanedo	Valencia	25	26	1.04
1979–80	(Francoist Spain) Luis Arconada	Real Sociedad	34	20	0.59
1980–81	(Francoist Spain) Luis Arconada	Real Sociedad	34	29	0.85
1981–82	(Francoist Spain) Luis Arconada	Real Sociedad	34	33	0.97
1982–83	(Spain) Agustín Rodríguez	Real Madrid	29	22	0.75
1983–84	(Spain) Javier Urruticoechea	Barcelona	33	26	0.78
1984–85	(Spain) Juan Carlos Ablanedo	Sporting Gijón	33	22	0.66
1985–86	(Spain) Juan Carlos Ablanedo	Sporting Gijón	34	27	0.79
1986–87	(Spain) Andoni Zubizarreta	Barcelona	43	29	0.67
1987–88	(Spain) Francisco Buyo	Real Madrid	35	23	0.65
1988–89	(Spain) José Manuel Ochotorena	Valencia	37	25	0.67
1989–90	(Spain) Juan Carlos Ablanedo	Sporting Gijón	31	25	0.80
1990–91	(Spain) Abel Resino	Atlético Madrid	33	17	0.51
1991–92	(Spain) Francisco Buyo	Real Madrid	35	27	0.77
1992–93	(Spain) Francisco Liaño	Deportivo La Coruña	37	31	0.83
1992–93	(Spain) Santiago Cañizares	Celta Vigo	36	30	0.83
1993–94	(Spain) Francisco Liaño	Deportivo La Coruña	38	18	0.47
1994–95	(Spain) Pedro Jaro	Real Betis	38	25	0.65
1995–96	(Spain) José Francisco Molina	Atlético Madrid	42	32	0.76
1996–97	(Cameroon) Jacques Songo'o	Deportivo La Coruña	37	28	0.76
1997–98	(Spain) Toni Jiménez	Espanyol	37	31	0.84
1998–99	(Argentina) Carlos Roa	Mallorca	35	29	0.83
1999–2000	(Argentina) Martín Herrera	Alavés	38	37	0.97
2000–01	(Spain) Santiago Cañizares	Valencia	37	34	0.92
2001–02	(Spain) Santiago Cañizares	Valencia	31	23	0.74
2002–03	(Argentina) Pablo Cavallero	Celta Vigo	34	27	0.79
2003–04	(Spain) Santiago Cañizares	Valencia	37	25	0.68
2004–05	(Spain) Víctor Valdés	Barcelona	35	25	0.71
2005–06	(Spain) José Manuel Pinto	Celta Vigo	36	28	0.78
2006–07	(Argentina) Roberto Abbondanzieri	Getafe	37	30	0.81
2007–08	(Spain) Iker Casillas	Real Madrid	36	32	0.89
2008–09	(Spain) Víctor Valdés	Barcelona	35	31	0.89
2009–10	(Spain) Víctor Valdés	Barcelona	38	24	0.63
2010–11	(Spain) Víctor Valdés	Barcelona	32	16	0.50
2011–12	(Spain) Víctor Valdés	Barcelona	35	28	0.80
2012–13	(Belgium) Thibaut Courtois	Atlético Madrid	37	29	0.78
2013–14	(Belgium) Thibaut Courtois	Atlético Madrid	37	24	0.65
2014–15	(Chile) Claudio Bravo	Barcelona	37	19	0.51
2015–16	(Slovenia) Jan Oblak	Atlético Madrid	38	18	0.47
2016–17	(Slovenia) Jan Oblak	Atlético Madrid	29	21	0.72
2017–18	(Slovenia) Jan Oblak	Atlético Madrid	37	22	0.59
2018–19	(Slovenia) Jan Oblak	Atlético Madrid	37	27	0.73
2019–20	(Belgium) Thibaut Courtois	Real Madrid	34	20	0.59
2020–21	(Slovenia) Jan Oblak	Atlético Madrid	38	25	0.66
2021–22	(Morocco) Yassine Bounou	Sevilla	31	24	0.77
2022–23	(Germany) Marc-André ter Stegen	Barcelona	38	20	0.52
2023–24	(Spain) Unai Simón	Athletic Bilbao	36	33	0.92
2024–25	(Slovenia) Jan Oblak	Atlético Madrid	36	30	0.83
2025–26	(Spain) Joan Garcia	Barcelona	30	21	0.69

=== Statistics ===
==== Multiple winners ====
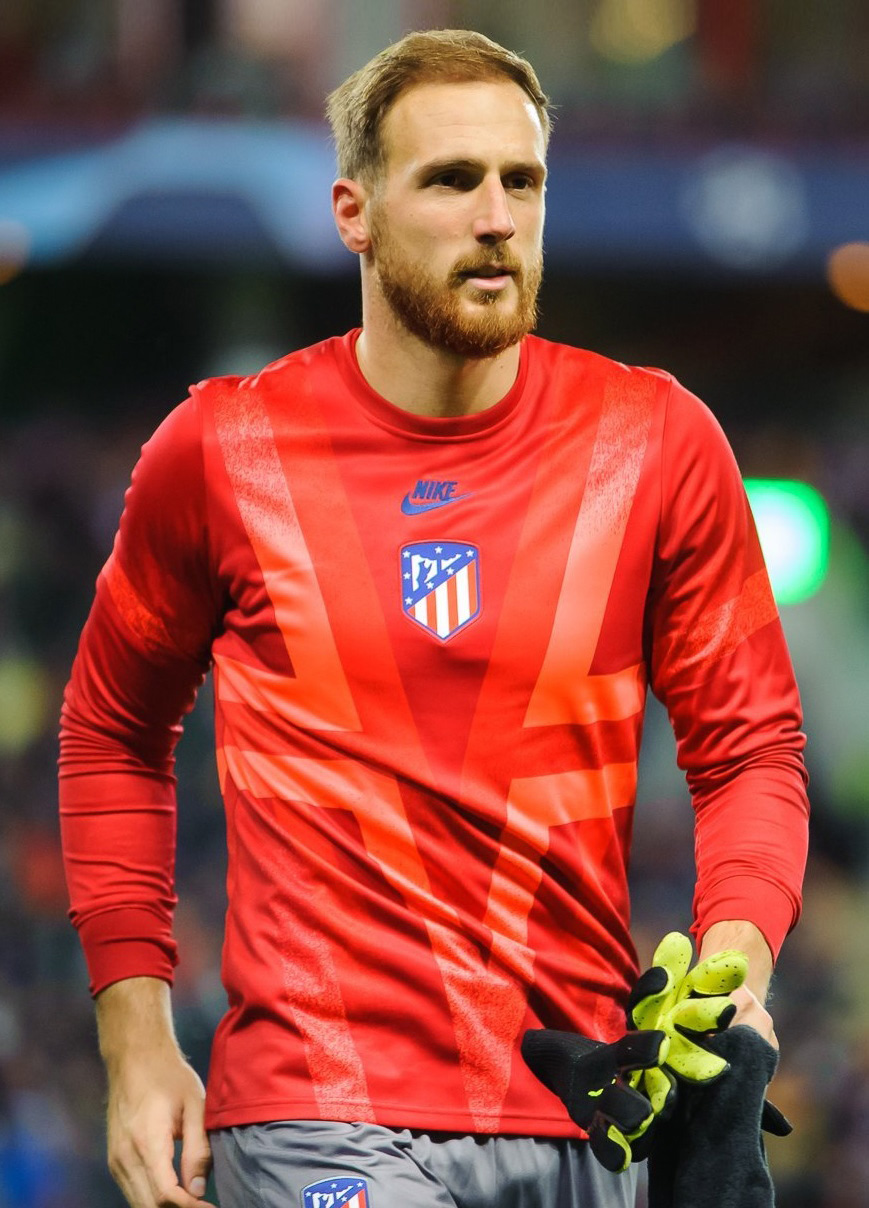
Jan Oblak is the record holder with six awards, and won the trophy four consecutive times from 2016 to 2019.

Player	Titles	Seasons
(Slovenia) Jan Oblak	6	2015–16, 2016–17, 2017–18, 2018–19, 2020–21, 2024–25
(Spain) Antoni Ramallets	5	1951–52, 1955–56, 1956–57, 1958–59, 1959–60
(Spain) Victor Valdés	5	2004–05, 2008–09, 2009–10, 2010–11, 2011–12
(Spain) Juan Acuña	4	1941–42, 1942–43, 1949–50, 1950–51
(Spain) Santiago Cañizares	4	1992–93, 2000–01, 2001–02, 2003–04
(Spain) Ricardo Zamora	3	1929, 1931–32, 1932–33
(Spain) Gregorio Blasco	3	1929–30, 1933–34, 1935–36
(Spain) José Vicente Train	3	1960–61, 1962–63, 1963–64
(Spain) Salvador Sadurní	3	1968–69, 1973–74, 1974–75
(Spain) Luis Arconada	3	1979–80, 1980–81, 1981–82
(Spain) Juan Carlos Ablanedo	3	1984–85, 1985–86, 1989–90
(Belgium) Thibaut Courtois	3	2012–13, 2013–14, 2019–20
(Spain) Ignacio Eizaguirre	2	1943–44, 1944–45
(France) Marcel Domingo	2	1948–49, 1952–53
(Spain) Antonio Betancort	2	1964–65, 1966–67
(Argentina) Jorge D'Alessandro	2	1974–75, 1976–77
(Spain) Francisco Buyo	2	1987–88, 1991–92
(Spain) Miguel Reina	2	1972–73, 1976–77

==== Wins by club ====
Club	Players	Total
Barcelona	12	22
Real Madrid	12	18
Atlético Madrid	9	15
Valencia	6	9
Deportivo La Coruña	3	7
Athletic Bilbao	5	7
Real Sociedad	1	3
Sporting Gijón	1	3
Celta Vigo	3	3
Espanyol	3	3
Salamanca	1	2
Real Betis	2	2
Arenas Getxo	1	1
Alavés	1	1
Getafe	1	1
Málaga	1	1
Mallorca	1	1
Sevilla	1	1

=== Wins by country ===
Country	Players	Total
Spain	48	79
Argentina	5	6
Slovenia	1	6
Belgium	1	3
France	1	2
Cameroon	1	1
Chile	1	1
Germany	1	1
Morocco	1	1

== Segunda División ==
=== Winners ===
Season	Player	Club	Matches played	Goals conceded	Coefficient
1985–86	(Spain) Joaquín Ferrer	Murcia	37	30	0.81
1986–87	(Spain) Javier Echevarría	Sestao	43	27	0.62
1986–87	(Spain) José Antonio Gallardo (Note: Gallardo was the provisional winner and the award was given after his death.)	Málaga	18	13	0.92
1987–88	(Spain) Joaquín Ferrer	Figueres	30	23	0.76
1988–89	(Morocco) Ezzaki Badou	Mallorca	28	15	0.53
1989–90	(Spain) Miguel Bastón	Burgos	38	24	0.63
1990–91	(Spain) Francisco Liaño	Sestao	38	27	0.71
1991–92	(Spain) José Ignacio Garmendia	Eibar	38	22	0.58
1992–93	(Croatia) Mauro Ravnić	Lleida	38	19	0.50
1993–94	(Spain) Toni Jiménez	Espanyol	38	25	0.66
1994–95	(Spain) Francisco Leal	Mérida	38	19	0.50
1995–96	(Spain) José Ignacio Garmendia	Eibar	36	30	0.83
1996–97	(Spain) Emilio López	Badajoz	37	22	0.61
1997–98	(Spain) Francisco Leal	Alavés	39	22	0.56
1998–99	(Federal Republic of Yugoslavia) Željko Cicović	Las Palmas	34	25	0.73
1999–2000	(Portugal) Nuno Espírito Santo	Mérida	41	31	0.75
2000–01	(Spain) César Quesada	Recreativo	38	23	0.61
2001–02	(Spain) Manuel Almunia	Eibar	35	19	0.56
2002–03	(Germany) Andreas Reinke	Murcia	40	21	0.53
2003–04	(Spain) Toño	Recreativo	28	19	0.68
2004–05	(Spain) Armando Ribeiro	Cádiz	40	26	0.65
2005–06	(Spain) Roberto Fernández	Sporting Gijón	38	31	0.82
2006–07	(Spain) Alberto López	Valladolid	35	28	0.80
2007–08	(Spain) Carlos Sánchez	Castellón	33	27	0.82
2008–09	(Spain) David Cobeño	Rayo Vallecano	40	35	0.88
2008–09	(Chile) Claudio Bravo	Real Sociedad	32	28	0.88
2009–10	(Spain) Vicente Guaita	Recreativo	30	24	0.80
2010–11	(Spain) Andrés Fernández	Huesca	31	26	0.84
2011–12	(Spain) Jaime Jiménez	Valladolid	40	36	0.90
2012–13	(Spain) Manu Herrera	Elche	39	25	0.64
2013–14	(Spain) Xabi Irureta	Eibar	40	27	0.67
2014–15	(Spain) Iván Cuéllar	Sporting Gijón	36	21	0.58
2015–16	(Spain) Isaac Becerra	Girona	42	28	0.67
2016–17	(Spain) Raúl Fernández	Levante	33	22	0.67
2017–18	(Spain) Alberto Cifuentes	Cádiz	42	29	0.69
2018–19	(Portugal) Rui Silva	Granada	40	27	0.68
2019–20	(Morocco) Munir	Málaga	38	29	0.76
2020–21	(Spain) Diego López	Espanyol	40	25	0.63
2021–22	(Spain) Fernando Martínez	Almería	41	33	0.80
2022–23	(Spain) Raúl Fernández	Granada	29	19	0.66
2023–24	(Spain) Diego Conde	Leganés	39	26	0.67
2024–25	(Argentina) Matías Dituro	Elche	38	33	0.87
2025–26	(Spain) Ander Cantero	Burgos	42	33	0.79

=== Statistics ===
==== Wins by player ====
Player	Titles	Seasons
(Spain) Raúl Fernández	2	2016–17, 2022–23
(Spain) Joaquín Ferrer	2	1985–86, 1987–88
(Spain) José Ignacio Garmendia	2	1991–92, 1995–96
(Spain) Francisco Leal	2	1994–95, 1997–98

==== Wins by club ====
Club	Players	Total
Eibar	3	4
Recreativo	3	3
Burgos	2	2
Cádiz	2	2
Elche	2	2
Espanyol	2	2
Granada	2	2
Málaga	2	2
Mérida	2	2
Murcia	2	2
Sestao	2	2
Sporting Gijón	2	2
Valladolid	2	2
Alavés	1	1
Almería	1	1
Badajoz	1	1
Castellón	1	1
Figueres	1	1
Girona	1	1
Huesca	1	1
Las Palmas	1	1
Levante	1	1
Lleida	1	1
Mallorca	1	1
Rayo Vallecano	1	1
Real Sociedad	1	1

=== Wins by country ===
Country	Players	Total
Spain	29	33
Morocco	2	2
Portugal	2	2
Argentina	1	1
Chile	1	1
Croatia	1	1
Germany	1	1
Serbia and Montenegro	1	1

== Liga F ==
=== Winners ===
Season	Player	Club	Matches played	Goals conceded	Coefficient
2015–16	(Spain) Sandra Paños	Barcelona	18	11	0.61
2016–17	(Chile) Christiane Endler	Valencia	23	9	0.39
2017–18	(Spain) Sandra Paños	Barcelona	26	12	0.46
2018–19	(Spain) Sandra Paños	Barcelona	27	11	0.40
2019–20	(Spain) Sandra Paños	Barcelona	19	5	0.26
2020–21	(Spain) Misa Rodríguez	Real Madrid	32	30	0.93
2021–22	(Spain) Elene Lete	Real Sociedad	22	12	0.54
2022–23	(Spain) Misa Rodríguez	Real Madrid	26	23	0.88
2023–24	(Spain) Lola Gallardo	Atlético Madrid	27	21	0.77
2024–25	(Spain) Cata Coll	Barcelona	22	11	0.5

=== Statistics ===
==== Wins by player ====
Player	Titles	Seasons
(Spain) Sandra Paños	4	2015–16, 2017–18, 2018–19, 2019–20
(Spain) Misa Rodríguez	2	2020–21, 2022–23

==== Wins by club ====
Club	Players	Total
Barcelona	2	5
Real Madrid	1	2
Atlético Madrid	1	1
Real Sociedad	1	1
Valencia	1	1

=== Wins by country ===
Country	Players	Total
Spain	5	9
Chile	1	1

== See also ==
- Don Balón Award
- Pichichi Trophy
- Zarra Trophy
- Trofeo Alfredo Di Stéfano
- Miguel Muñoz Trophy
- Ballon d'Or
