= Fabio García-Moreno =

Spanish footballer (born 2008)

Personal information
- Full name: Fabio García-Moreno Rodríguez
- Date of birth: 30 January 2008 (age 18)
- Place of birth: Madridejos, Spain
- Position: Forward

Team information
- Current team: Albacete B
- Number: 25

Youth career
- Odelot Toletum
- 2022–2026: Albacete

Senior career*
Years	Team	Apps	(Gls)
2026–	Albacete B	1	(0)
2026–	Albacete	2	(0)
- * Club domestic league appearances and goals as of 31 May 2026

Fabio García-Moreno Rodríguez (born 30 January 2008) is a Spanish footballer who plays as a forward for Atlético Albacete.

== Career ==
Born in Madridejos, Toledo, Castilla–La Mancha, García-Moreno joined Albacete Balompié's youth sides in 2022, from EF Odelot Toletum. He made his senior debut with the reserves on 10 May 2026, coming on as a second-half substitute in a 2–0 Tercera Federación away win over AD San Clemente.

García-Moreno made his first team debut on 24 May 2026, replacing Carlos Neva in a 3–1 home win over Real Sociedad B for the Segunda División championship.
