= Rubio (footballer, born 1981) =

Spanish footballer

Personal information
- Full name: Javier Gómez Cifuentes
- Date of birth: 29 July 1981 (age 45)
- Place of birth: Albacete, Spain
- Height: 1.76 m (5 ft 9 1/2 in)
- Position: Midfielder

Youth career
- Albacete

Senior career*
Years	Team	Apps	(Gls)
1999–2002	Albacete B		
2000–2001	→ Deportivo B (loan)	28	(2)
2001–2003	Albacete	16	(0)
2003	→ Ciudad Murcia (loan)	11	(1)
2003–2004	Zamora	19	(1)
2004–2005	Mazarrón	34	(3)
2005–2006	Almansa	36	(1)
2006–2007	Baza	35	(1)
2007–2008	Las Palas	35	(6)
2008–2009	Villarrobledo	30	(0)
2009–2011	Hellín	68	(5)
2011–2012	La Gineta	26	(6)
2012–2013	Madridejos	23	(1)
2014–2015	Los Yébenes	20	(1)

International career
1999	Spain U17	3	(1)
1999	Spain U18	2	(1)
2001	Spain U20	1	(0)
- * Club domestic league appearances and goals

Javier Gómez Cifuentes (born 29 July 1981), commonly known as Rubio, is a Spanish former footballer who played as a midfielder.
