= Dani Bernabéu =

Spanish footballer (born 2007)

Personal information
- Full name: Daniel Bernabéu García
- Date of birth: 15 January 2007 (age 19)
- Place of birth: Cartagena, Spain
- Height: 1.75 m (5 ft 9 in)
- Position: Left-back

Team information
- Current team: Albacete
- Number: 27

Youth career
- Santa Ana
- 2018–2024: Cartagena
- 2024–2025: Albacete

Senior career*
Years	Team	Apps	(Gls)
2024	Cartagena B	1	(0)
2025–	Albacete B	13	(0)
2025–	Albacete	11	(0)
- * Club domestic league appearances and goals as of 29 August 2026

Daniel "Dani" Bernabéu García (born 15 January 2007) is a Spanish footballer who plays as a left-back for Albacete Balompié.

== Career ==
Born in Cartagena, Region of Murcia, Bernabéu represented hometown sides EF Santa Ana and FC Cartagena, making his senior debut with the latter's reserves on 7 April 2024 by coming on as a late substitute in a 4–0 Segunda Federación home loss to CD Manchego Ciudad Real. In July of that year, he moved to Albacete Balompié and returned to the youth setup.

On 15 May 2025, after already making his debut with Alba's B-team in Tercera Federación, Bernabéu renewed his contract with the club until 2028. He spent the 2025 pre-season with the main squad, and made his professional debut on 31 August of that year, coming on as a late substitute for Fran Gámez in a 2–1 Segunda División away loss to Cádiz CF.
