= Tomás Inglés =

Spanish footballer (born 2004)

Personal information
- Full name: Tomás Inglés Navarro
- Date of birth: 7 April 2004 (age 22)
- Place of birth: Lorca, Spain
- Height: 1.78 m (5 ft 10 in)
- Position: Forward

Team information
- Current team: Albacete B
- Number: 9

Youth career
- 2014–2016: Lorca CFB
- 2016–2022: Valencia
- 2021–2022: → Alzira (loan)
- 2022–2023: Málaga

Senior career*
Years	Team	Apps	(Gls)
2022	Valencia B	0	(0)
2022	→ Alzira (loan)	2	(0)
2023–2024	Málaga B	0	(0)
2023–2024	→ UCAM Murcia B (loan)	34	(7)
2024–2025	Águilas B	20	(9)
2024–2025	Águilas	13	(0)
2025–2026	Lorca Deportiva	7	(0)
2026–	Albacete B	15	(2)
2026–	Albacete	1	(0)
- * Club domestic league appearances and goals as of 16 August 2026

Tomás Inglés Navarro (born 7 April 2004) is a Spanish footballer who plays as a forward for Atlético Albacete.

== Career ==
Born in Lorca, Region of Murcia, Inglés joined Valencia CF's youth categories in 2016, from hometown side Lorca CFB. He was loaned to UD Alzira in 2021, and made his senior debut in the Segunda División RFEF with the club despite being mainly a part of the Juvenil squad.

In May 2022, Inglés moved to Málaga CF and returned to youth football. On 30 August 2023, he was loaned to Tercera Federación side UCAM Murcia CF B, where he featured regularly.

On 29 July 2024, Inglés signed for Águilas FC, being initially a member of the reserves also in the fifth division. After also featuring with the main squad in the fourth tier, he returned to his hometown with CF Lorca Deportiva of the same category on 10 June 2025.

On 16 January 2026, after featuring rarely, Inglés was transferred to Albacete Balompié and was assigned to the B-team in division five. After helping the B's in their first-ever promotion to the fourth division, he made his professional debut on 16 August, coming on as a second-half substitute for injured Samuel Obeng in a 2–1 Segunda División away loss to UD Las Palmas.
