= José Antonio Gallardo =

Spanish footballer (1961–1987)

Personal information
- Full name: José Antonio Gallardo Marín
- Date of birth: 31 December 1961
- Place of birth: Torremolinos, Spain
- Date of death: 15 January 1987 (aged 25)
- Place of death: Málaga, Spain
- Height: 1.82 m (6 ft 0 in)
- Position: Goalkeeper

Senior career*
Years	Team	Apps	(Gls)
1979–1984	Atlético Malagueño		
1984–1987	Málaga	21	(0)
Total		21	(0)
- * Club domestic league appearances and goals

José Antonio Gallardo Marín (31 December 1961 – 15 January 1987) was a Spanish footballer who played as a goalkeeper.

He played 25 professional matches for Málaga, dying aged 25 from complications after a collision during a game.

== Club career ==
Born in Torremolinos, Province of Málaga, Gallardo began his career at local Atlético Malagueño in 1979. He graduated to CD Málaga five years later, making his professional debut on 9 September 1984 and keeping a clean sheet in a 1–0 La Liga away win against Real Sociedad; it was his only appearance of a season that ended in relegation.

In April 1985, Gallardo played both legs of a 3–2 aggregate win over CA Osasuna in the first round of the Copa de la Liga. The following month, he did the same in a 2–4 aggregate loss to Athletic Bilbao in the next round.

As Fernando dominated in goal, Gallardo played only once in 1985–86, a 1–1 draw at Cartagena FC in the last Segunda División match on 18 May. After the former was sold to Sevilla FC in the summer of 1986, the latter became first-choice and conceded 14 goals in 19 matches during the first part of the campaign.

== Accident and death ==
On 21 December 1986, in a 3–2 loss to RC Celta de Vigo at Balaídos, Gallardo suffered a head injury after a collision with opposing striker Baltazar. He recovered after three hours of critical medical treatment in the Galician city and, despite facial paralysis and memory loss, he was making progress. However, on 7 January, he fell acutely ill after lunch, and his family took him to the local medical centre, where he was transferred to Málaga's Carlos Haya hospital.

Gallardo, already in a coma, had a cerebral haemorrhage that had begun in his left temporal lobe and had spilt over three quarters of his brain. He died eight days later, aged 25, and was buried in Arroyo de la Miel.

As Gallardo had the best goals-against average at that point of the season, newspaper Marca posthumously awarded him the Ricardo Zamora Trophy for best goalkeeping in the division.

== Honours ==
- Ricardo Zamora Trophy (Segunda División): 1986–87
