= Capi (footballer, born 2006) =

Spanish footballer (born 2006)

Personal information
- Full name: Hugo Martínez González
- Date of birth: 23 August 2006 (age 20)
- Place of birth: Albacete, Spain
- Height: 1.78 m (5 ft 10 in)
- Position: Midfielder

Team information
- Current team: Albacete B
- Number: 10

Youth career
- 2011–2024: Albacete

Senior career*
Years	Team	Apps	(Gls)
2023–	Albacete B	36	(0)
2025–	Albacete	1	(0)

International career
2023	Spain U17	10	(0)
- * Club domestic league appearances and goals as of 19 October 2025

Hugo Martínez González (born 23 August 2006), commonly known as Capi, is a Spanish footballer who plays as a midfielder for Atlético Albacete.

== Club career ==
Born in Albacete, Castilla–La Mancha, Capi joined Albacete Balompié's youth sides in 2011, aged five. He made his senior debut with the reserves on 12 November 2023, playing the last 13 minutes in a 3–1 Tercera Federación home win over CD Villacañas.

On 27 December 2023, Capi renewed his contract with Alba until 2027. After being regularly used with the B's in the 2024–25 season as the side narrowly missed out promotion, he made his first team debut on 19 October 2025, coming on as a second-half substitute for José Carlos Lazo in a 1–0 Segunda División away win over CD Castellón.

== International career ==
On 5 December 2022, Capi was called up to the Spain national under-17 team. He managed to feature in ten matches for the side during the year of 2023, playing with the likes of Lamine Yamal and Pau Cubarsí.
