= Jota (footballer, born 2006) =

Spanish footballer (born 2006)

Personal information
- Full name: Joaquín Domingo Ponce
- Date of birth: 14 May 2006 (age 20)
- Place of birth: Iniesta, Spain
- Position: Right-back

Team information
- Current team: Albacete B
- Number: 12

Youth career
- 2015–2024: Albacete

Senior career*
Years	Team	Apps	(Gls)
2023–	Albacete B	29	(0)
2025–	Albacete	1	(0)
- * Club domestic league appearances and goals as of 1 June 2025

Joaquín Domingo Ponce (born 14 May 2006), commonly known as Jota, is a Spanish footballer who plays as a right-back for Atlético Albacete.

== Career ==
Born in Iniesta, Cuenca, Castilla–La Mancha, Jota joined Albacete Balompié's youth sides in 2015, aged nine. He made his senior debut with the reserves on 12 March 2023, coming on as a late substitute in a 1–0 Primera Autonómica Preferente away win over AD Campillo.

Jota only started to feature regularly for the B-team during the 2024–25 season, in Tercera Federación, and renewed his contract until 2027 on 15 May 2025. He made his first team debut on 1 June, replacing goalscorer Javier Martón in a 1–1 Segunda División away draw against Córdoba CF.
