= Željko Cicović =

Serbian footballer

Personal information
- Full name: Željko Cicović
- Date of birth: 2 September 1970 (age 56)
- Place of birth: Belgrade, SR Serbia, SFR Yugoslavia
- Height: 1.92 m (6 ft 4 in)
- Position: Goalkeeper

Youth career
- Rad

Senior career*
Years	Team	Apps	(Gls)
1989–1997	Rad	150	(0)
1997–2005	Las Palmas	158	(0)
Total		308	(0)

International career
1990–1991	Yugoslavia U21	4	(0)
2000	FR Yugoslavia	6	(0)
- * Club domestic league appearances and goals

Željko Cicović (Serbian Cyrillic: Жељко Цицовић; born 2 September 1970) is a Serbian former professional footballer who played as a goalkeeper.

== Club career ==
During his 16-year-long career, Cicović played for Rad (1989–1997) and Las Palmas (1997–2005). He won the Ricardo Zamora Trophy in the 1998–99 Segunda División.

== International career ==
At international level, Cicović made his debut for Serbia and Montenegro in a March 2000 friendly match away against Macedonia and was capped six times in total. He was part of the team at UEFA Euro 2000, remaining an unused substitute throughout the tournament.

== Honours ==
Las Palmas

- Segunda División: 1999–2000

Individual

- Ricardo Zamora Trophy: 1998–99 Segunda División
- Toulon Tournament Best Goalkeeper: 1992
