= Máximo Hernández =

Spanish footballer (1945–2020)

Personal information
- Full name: Máximo Hernández Sánchez
- Date of birth: 11 August 1945
- Place of birth: Madrid, Spain
- Date of death: 22 March 2020 (aged 74)
- Place of death: Madrid, Spain
- Height: 1.78 m (5 ft 10 in)
- Position: Centre back

Youth career
- Real Madrid

Senior career*
Years	Team	Apps	(Gls)
1965–1968	Rayo Vallecano	77	(0)
1968–1970	Celta	23	(0)
1970–1972	Sporting Gijón	42	(0)
1972–1974	Rayo Vallecano	75	(1)
1974–1975	Eldense		
Total		236	(1)

Managerial career
- 1975–1976: Carabanchel
- 1976–1978: Atlético Madrid B
- 1978–1979: Ceuta
- 1979–1980: Albacete
- 1981–1982: Getafe Deportivo
- 1983: Rayo Vallecano
- 1986–1990: Moscardó
- 1994–1995: SS Reyes
- 1995–1996: Aranjuez
- 1997: Rayo Vallecano
- 1998: Rayo Vallecano
- 1998–1999: Talavera
- 2001: Xerez
- 2002–2003: Numancia
- 2004–2005: Numancia
- 2008: Albacete
- 2009: Albacete
- * Club domestic league appearances and goals

Máximo Hernández Sánchez (11 August 1945 – 22 March 2020) was a Spanish footballer who played as a central defender, and a coach.

== Playing career ==
Born in Madrid, Hernández graduated with Real Madrid's youth setup, and moved to neighbouring Rayo Vallecano in the 1965 summer. He made his professional debut on 5 September of that year, playing the full 90 minutes in a 3–0 Segunda División home win against CD Badajoz.

In 1968 Hernández joined Celta de Vigo, also in the second level. He contributed with 19 matches during his first season, as his side was promoted to La Liga, and made his debut in the category on 14 September 1969, in a 1–2 away loss against Real Sociedad.

In 1970 Hernández moved to fellow league team Sporting de Gijón. After appearing regularly over the course of two full seasons, he returned to his first senior club Rayo, being an undisputed starter for the side.

Hernández signed for CD Eldense in 1974, and retired with the club in the following year at the age of 29.

== Post-playing career ==
Immediately after retiring Hernández took up coaching, starting with RCD Carabanchel. After stints at Atlético Madrid B, AD Ceuta and Albacete Balompié, he was appointed manager of Getafe Deportivo in the second level on 5 July 1981.

In the 1983 summer Hernández was named Rayo Vallecano manager, but was dismissed after only eight matches in charge. He subsequently managed CDC Moscardó, taking the side from the regional leagues to Segunda División B.

On 19 March 1997 Hernández returned to Rayo, with his side seriously threatened with relegation. After failing to save the club from the drop, he stepped down in June, but was again appointed manager in March of the following year.

After managing Talavera CF and Xerez CD, Hernández was appointed director of football at CD Numancia. He was named manager of the latter in December 2002, replacing fired Manuel Sarabia, and was replaced by Quique Hernández after the end of the campaign, returning to his previous duties.

On 8 November 2004 Hernández was again appointed at the helm of the Rojillos, now in the main category, after the dismissal of Francisco. He failed to retain its division status, and in 2007 moved to Albacete also as a director of football.

Hernández was also a manager of Alba during two stints, both in the second level.

He died on 22 March 2020.
