= David Vidal =

Spanish footballer & manager (born 1950)

Personal information
- Full name: David Vidal Tomé
- Date of birth: 2 August 1950 (age 76)
- Place of birth: Porto do Son, Spain
- Position: Centre-back

Senior career*
Years	Team	Apps	(Gls)
1969–1972	Fabril	45	(4)
1972–1973	Lleida	33	(4)
1973–1974	Deportivo La Coruña	9	(2)
1974–1975	Cádiz	6	(0)
1975–1976	Villarreal	27	(3)
1976–1977	Jerez	32	(0)
1977–1978	Gimnàstico Melilla	27	(0)
1978–1979	Cartagena	14	(0)
1979–1980	Logroñés	18	(0)
1980–1981	Jerez Industrial	34	(3)
1981–1982	AgD Ceuta	1	(0)
Total		246	(16)

Managerial career
- 1986: Cádiz
- 1987: Cádiz
- 1988–1990: Cádiz
- 1990–1993: Logroñés
- 1994: Rayo Vallecano
- 1995–1996: Villarreal
- 1997–1998: Hércules
- 1999–2000: Compostela
- 2002–2003: Murcia
- 2003–2004: Las Palmas
- 2005–2006: Lleida
- 2007–2008: Elche
- 2010: Albacete
- 2011: Albacete
- 2013: Xerez
- 2016: Guadalajara
- 2017: Lorca
- 2019–2020: Racing Murcia
- * Club domestic league appearances and goals

David Vidal Tomé (born 2 August 1950) is a Spanish football manager and former player who played as a centre-back.

== Career ==
Vidal was born in Porto do Son, A Coruña, Galicia. After an unassuming career (the central defender never played in La Liga and appeared in only 15 Segunda División games) he took up coaching in 1982, first with Cádiz CF in his adopted city.

Vidal began with the Andalusians' youth sides, then moved to assistant manager, being finally appointed head coach for the 1988–89 season after a brief interim spell in 1987. It was during that time he managed arguably the club's best ever player, Mágico González, of whom he once said: "Technically he was better than Maradona".

After two and a half additional years in the top flight with modest CD Logroñés, who always retained their status, Vidal resumed his career mainly in the second tier. On 12 January 2007, he was appointed manager of Elche CF following the sacking of Luis García. On 12 October 2008, as a draw at RC Celta de Vigo meant Elche only managed two points from seven matches, the manager was dismissed after a meeting with the board of directors; his assistant, former Spain and Deportivo de La Coruña player Claudio Barragán, was temporarily placed in charge of the team.

On 17 March 2010, Albacete Balompié announced that Vidal would replace Julián Rubio as manager until the end of the campaign. Having helped the Castilla–La Mancha side to avoid relegation from division two, as 15th, he was released.

Vidal returned to Albacete midway through the 2010–11 season, replacing the fired Antonio Calderón. He was also relieved of his duties after only one and a half months in charge, as the team was eventually relegated to the Segunda División B after 21 years.

After two years out of football, Vidal was appointed at Tercera División club Xerez CD on 13 July 2013. As it was in the midst of severe economic problems, he left less than one month later, and continued to work in the lower leagues.

In May 2017, Vidal achieved promotion to the second division with Lorca FC after arriving the previous month. On 5 June, however, his contract was not extended.

On 20 June 2019, Vidal was appointed manager of Racing Murcia FC in the regional leagues. In October 2020, he left for personal reasons and was replaced by Antonio Pedreño.

== Honours ==
=== Manager ===
Murcia

- Segunda División: 2002–03
