= Miguel Bastón =

Spanish footballer

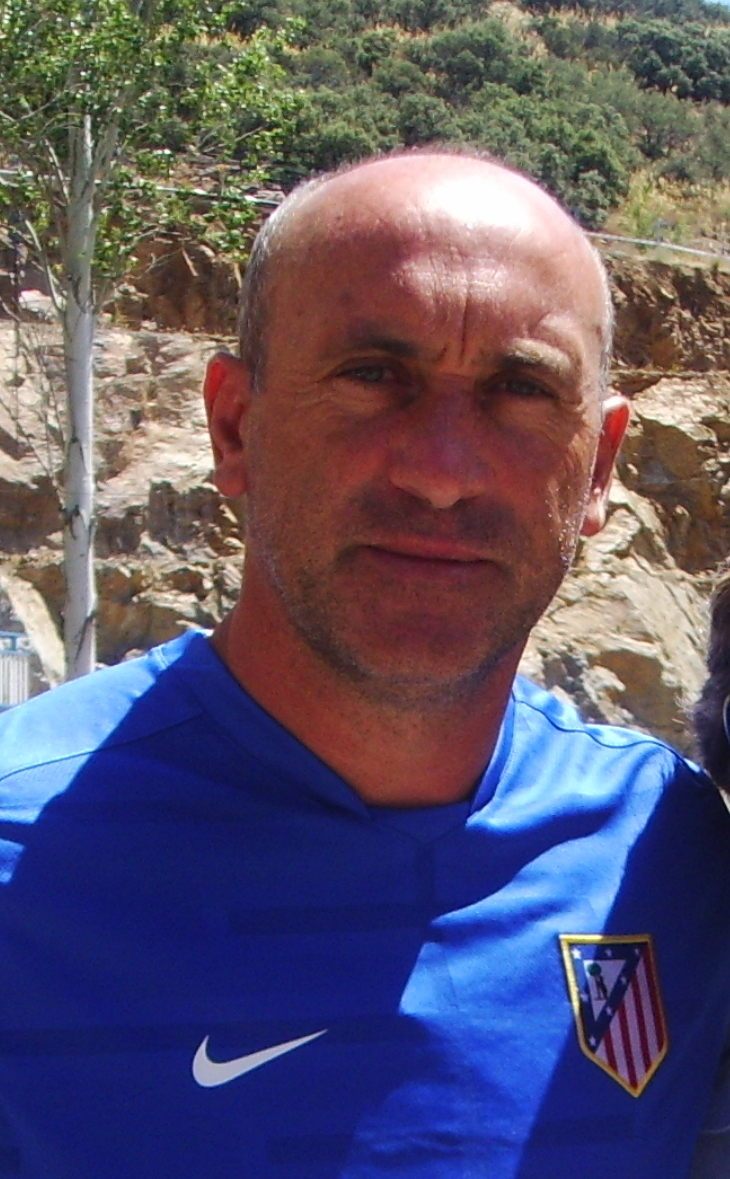
- Bastón as Atlético Madrid B goalkeeper coach

Personal information
- Full name: Miguel González Bastón
- Date of birth: 29 June 1961 (age 65)
- Place of birth: Marín, Spain
- Height: 1.84 m (6 ft 0 in)
- Position: Goalkeeper

Senior career*
Years	Team	Apps	(Gls)
1980–1984	Atlético Madrid B	11	(0)
1984–1994	Burgos	203	(0)
1994–1995	Chaves	19	(0)
Total		233	(0)
- * Club domestic league appearances and goals

Miguel González Bastón (born 29 June 1961) is a Spanish former footballer who played as a goalkeeper.

== Playing career ==
Born in Marín, Pontevedra, Galicia, Bastón began his career with Atlético Madrid, appearing for their reserve side in the Segunda División. His opportunities were limited due to the presence of Eduardo Belza, Ángel Mejías and Abel Resino, and he signed with Real Burgos in 1984, where in the 1989–90 season he won the Ricardo Zamora Trophy and helped his team to gain promotion to La Liga as champions.

Bastón played the first of his ten games in the Spanish top flight on 2 September 1990, in a 1–0 home win against Cádiz. In the summer of 1994, after the club dropped two levels in just two years, subsequently folding, the 33-year-old joined Chaves of the Portuguese Primeira Liga, retiring at the end of the 1994–95 campaign.

== Coaching career ==
On 20 January 2011, Bastón returned to Atlético B as well as the C team as goalkeeping coach, when his former teammate Mejías left for Beşiktaş.

== Personal life ==
Bastón's son, Borja, was also a footballer. A striker, he too came through Atlético's youth system; although not one of his legal surnames, Borja was also known as Bastón.

== Honours ==
Burgos

- Segunda División: 1989–90
- Tercera División: 1984–85

Individual

- Ricardo Zamora Trophy (Segunda División): 1989–90
