= Francisco Leal (footballer) =

Spanish footballer (born 1964)

Personal information
- Full name: Francisco Leal Rodríguez
- Date of birth: 23 July 1964 (age 62)
- Place of birth: Osuna, Spain
- Height: 1.92 m (6 ft 4 in)
- Position: Goalkeeper

Youth career
- 1980–1983: Sevilla

Senior career*
Years	Team	Apps	(Gls)
1983–1985	Sevilla Atlético		
1985–1986	Recreativo Huelva	0	(0)
1986–1987	Lorca Deportiva		
1987–1988	Melilla	12	(0)
1987–1993	Atlético Marbella	139+	(0)
1993–1997	Mérida	124	(0)
1997–1998	Alavés	39	(0)
1998–1999	Sevilla	24	(0)
Total		308+	(0)
- * Club domestic league appearances and goals

Francisco Leal Rodríguez (born 23 July 1964) is a Spanish former footballer who played as a goalkeeper.

He started and ended his career at Sevilla, and played 181 Segunda División games for that club, Atlético Marbella, Mérida and Alavés. He won that league's title twice with Mérida and once with Alavés, as well as winning the Ricardo Zamora Trophy for best goalkeeper once with each of those clubs. His one La Liga season was 1995–96 for Mérida, playing every minute.

== Career ==
Born in Osuna in the Province of Seville, Leal was a youth player at local Sevilla FC. Aged 16, he made the reserve team, Sevilla Atlético, in the Tercera División. Sensing that his opportunities in the first team were low, he moved to Recreativo de Huelva and then Lorca Deportiva. He helped the latter to promotion from the fourth tier in 1986–87 and earned a trial at Barcelona, which did not result in a transfer due to the demands of the selling club's president.

Leal instead spent 1987–88 at Melilla before heading to Atlético Marbella, where he achieved two consecutive promotions to reach the Segunda División by 1993. Due to the Costa del Sol team's high outlay, he then moved to Mérida, where he won the Ricardo Zamora Trophy for best goalkeeper (19 goals conceded in 38 games) as they won the second tier in 1994–95.

Leal and Mérida both debuted in La Liga on the same day. Their season ended with relegation, though he played the entire 3,780 minutes of 42 games, a figure only matched by his Atlético Madrid counterpart José Francisco Molina. The team won promotion back as champions immediately, but Leal had faced stiffer competition from Juan Carlos Balaguer and decided to leave for Alavés.

In 1997–98, his only season for the club from Vitoria-Gasteiz, Leal was second-tier champion and received the Zamora Trophy again, making him the only person to win it with different clubs in the Segunda División. He conceded 22 goals in 39 games. He also helped his team to the semi-finals of the Copa del Rey, where they lost to Mallorca.

Leal returned to Sevilla at age 34 in 1998. He helped the team to promotion to the top flight, his third in succession; he had played the majority of games over the campaign, but was replaced by Monchi from February. The latter, as director of football, named him goalkeeper coach, a position he resigned from in October 2010.
