= José Ignacio Garmendia =

Spanish footballer

Personal information
- Full name: José Ignacio Garmendia Mendizábal
- Date of birth: 4 April 1960 (age 66)
- Place of birth: Villabona, Spain
- Height: 1.77 m (5 ft 9 1/2 in)
- Position: Goalkeeper

Youth career
- Danena Zirzurkil
- Hernani
- 1978–1979: Eibar

Senior career*
Years	Team	Apps	(Gls)
1979–1998	Eibar	636	(1)
- * Club domestic league appearances and goals

José Ignacio Garmendia Mendizábal (born 4 April 1960) is a Spanish former professional footballer who played as a goalkeeper.

== Club career ==
Garmendia was born in Villabona, Gipuzkoa. He played solely for Basque club SD Eibar, in a career that lasted 19 years. He stayed with the team as they competed consecutively in the nation's fourth, third and second divisions, making 322 appearances in the latter.

On 17 April 1988, in a third-tier match against Pontevedra CF, Garmendia scored from his goal, and Eibar would also promote at the end of the campaign. He retired ten years later at the age of 38, only having been second choice precisely in his last season (three games) and with the side always retaining their league status; he collected two Ricardo Zamora Trophy awards in the process.

== Personal life ==
Still during his career, and after retiring, Garmendia ran a butcher shop in his hometown.

== See also ==
- List of one-club men
