= Marcel Domingo =

French footballer (1924–2010)

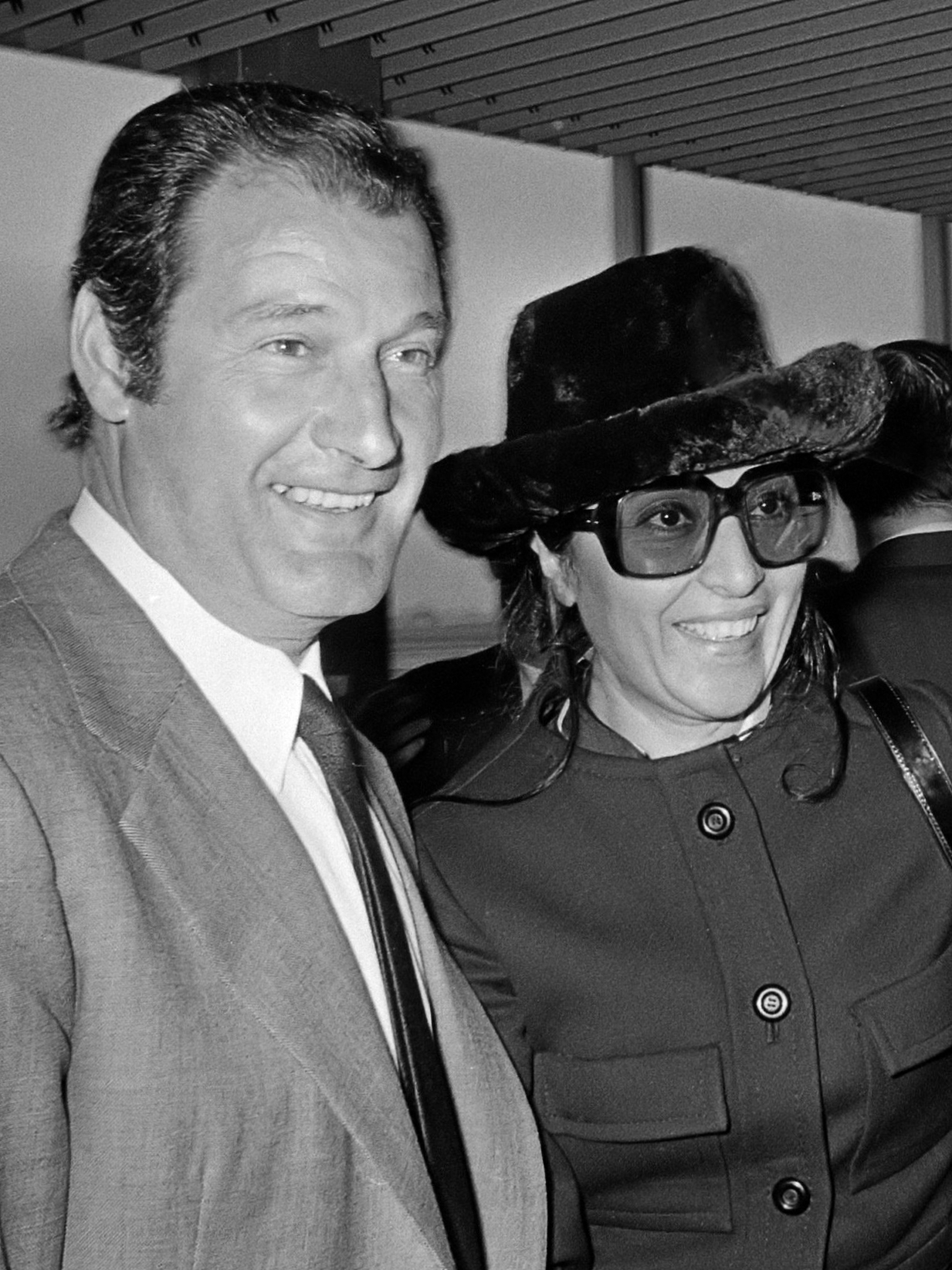
- Domingo with his wife in 1971

Personal information
- Date of birth: 15 January 1924
- Place of birth: Salin-de-Giraud, France
- Date of death: 10 December 2010 (aged 86)
- Place of death: Arles, France
- Position: Goalkeeper

Youth career
- –1944: Arles

Senior career*
Years	Team	Apps	(Gls)
1944–1945	Nice		
1945–1948	Stade Français	75	(0)
1948–1951	Atlético Madrid	75	(0)
1951–1952	Nice	33	(0)
1952–1956	Espanyol	77	(0)
1956–1958	Marseille	46	(0)

International career
1948	France	1	(0)
1955	Catalonia	1	(0)

Managerial career
- 1958–1959: Espanyol
- 1959–1960: Las Palmas
- 1962–1963: Lleida
- 1964–1965: Pontevedra
- 1966–1968: Córdoba
- 1968–1969: Granada
- 1969–1972: Atlético Madrid
- 1972–1975: Málaga
- 1975–1976: Elche
- 1976–1977: Burgos
- 1977–1979: Valencia
- 1979: Recreativo
- 1979–1980: Atlético Madrid
- 1981–1982: Nice
- 1982–1983: Betis
- 1983–1984: Mallorca
- 1984–1986: Nîmes Olympique
- Arles
- 1989: Hércules
- * Club domestic league appearances and goals

Marcel Domingo Algara (15 January 1924 – 10 December 2010) was a French football goalkeeper and manager of Spanish origin.

== Career ==
He spent part of his career in Spain. Domingo coached RCD Espanyol, UD Las Palmas, UE Lleida, Pontevedra CF, Córdoba CF, Granada CF, Atlético de Madrid, CD Málaga, Elche CF, Burgos CF, Valencia CF, OGC Nice, Real Betis, RCD Mallorca, Nîmes Olympique, AC Arles and Hércules CF.

== Death ==
In 2010, Domingo died aged 86.

== Honours ==
=== Player ===
Nice

- Division 1: 1952
- Coupe de France: 1952

Atlético Madrid

- Spanish League: 1949–50, 1950–51

Individual

- Ricardo Zamora Trophy: 1949, 1953

=== Manager ===
Pontevedra

- Segunda División: 1964–65

Atlético Madrid

- Spanish League: 1969–70
- Copa del Generalísimo: 1971–72

Valencia

- Copa del Rey: 1978–79
