= Antonio David (footballer, born 2005) =

Spanish footballer (born 2005)

Personal information
- Full name: Antonio David Moreno Moreno
- Date of birth: 11 October 2005 (age 21)
- Place of birth: Arcos de la Frontera, Spain
- Height: 1.80 m (5 ft 11 in)
- Position: Midfielder

Team information
- Current team: Albacete B
- Number: 14

Youth career
- 2011–2017: Arcos
- 2017–2019: Málaga
- 2019–2020: San Félix
- 2020–2024: Real Madrid

Senior career*
Years	Team	Apps	(Gls)
2023–2025	Real Madrid B	28	(0)
2023–2024	Real Madrid C	9	(1)
2025–	Albacete	1	(0)
2025–2026	→ Murcia (loan)	14	(1)
2026–	Albacete B	0	(0)

International career
2021–2022	Spain U17	14	(0)
2022	Spain U18	4	(0)
- * Club domestic league appearances and goals as of 6 September 2026

Antonio David Moreno Moreno (born 11 October 2005), known as Antonio David, is a Spanish footballer who plays as a midfielder for Atlético Albacete.

== Club career ==
Born in Arcos de la Frontera, Cádiz, Andalusia, Antonio David began his career with hometown side Arcos CF, and played for the youth categories of Málaga CF before signing for Real Madrid in June 2020. He made his senior debut with the reserves on 16 September 2023, coming on as a late substitute for Manuel Ángel in a 2–2 Primera Federación home draw against Atlético Madrid B, and scored from the midfield for the C-team the following day, in a 3–0 home win over CF Trival Valderas.

Antonio David played for the Juvenil and C-team squads for the remainder of the season, before being promoted to Castilla in July 2024. On 7 August 2025, he signed a three-year contract with Segunda División side Albacete Balompié, being immediately loaned to Real Murcia CF in the third division.

Back to Alba in July 2026, Antonio David was initially assigned to the B-side in Segunda Federación, but made his professional debut on 6 September, replacing Sergio Ortuño in a 2–0 away loss to CD Castellón.

== International career ==
In May 2021, Antonio David was called up to the Spain under-16 football team for a period of trainings.
