= Álex Rubio (footballer, born 2002) =

Spanish footballer (born 2002)

Personal information
- Full name: Álex Rubio Roldán
- Date of birth: 25 July 2002 (age 24)
- Place of birth: Colmenar de Oreja, Spain
- Height: 1.75 m (5 ft 9 in)
- Position: Forward

Team information
- Current team: Albacete
- Number: 19

Youth career
- 2019–2020: Colmenar Oreja
- 2020–2021: Fuenlabrada
- 2021: Real Aranjuez

Senior career*
Years	Team	Apps	(Gls)
2021–2022	Real Aranjuez	32	(12)
2022–2023	Muleño	27	(18)
2023–2024	Murcia	21	(3)
2024–2025	Antequera	27	(7)
2025–2026	Villarreal B	18	(8)
2026–	Albacete	17	(4)
- * Club domestic league appearances and goals as of 9 June 2026

Álex Rubio Roldán (born 25 July 2002) is a Spanish footballer who plays for Albacete Balompié. Mainly a forward, he can also play as a winger.

== Career ==
Born in Colmenar de Oreja, Community of Madrid, Rubio began his career with hometown side CD Colmenar de Oreja before joining CF Fuenlabrada in 2020. In February of the following year, he moved to Tercera División side Real Aranjuez CF; initially a member of the Juvenil squad, he made his senior debut in a 0–0 draw against CA Pinto on 14 March, which his side later lost for fielding him an ineligible player, as he was registered outside the transfer window.

On 21 July 2021, Rubio was definitely promoted to the main squad of Aranjuez, now in the Preferente de Madrid. The following 15 July, after scoring 12 goals, he left the club after refusing a renewal offer, and subsequently signed for Muleño CF in Tercera Federación.

On 6 July 2023, after scoring a career-best 18 goals and being the top scorer of their group, Rubio joined Primera Federación club Real Murcia CF. On 26 August 2024, he was transferred to fellow league team Antequera CF.

On 11 June 2025, Rubio renewed his contract with the Verdiblancos for a further year, but moved to Villarreal CF's reserves on 1 September, after the club activated his € 300,000 release clause. At the latter side, he scored eight goals in just 18 matches, including a hat-trick in a 4–1 home routing of Betis Deportivo.

On 2 February 2026, Rubio signed for Segunda División side Albacete Balompié on a four-and-a-half-year deal, with the transfer fee being reported as around € 1 million. He made his professional debut six days later, coming on as a second-half substitute for Javi Villar in a 2–1 away loss to Deportivo de La Coruña.
