= Albacete Balompié =

Association football club in Spain

- Full name: Albacete Balompié, S.A.D.
- Nickname: Queso Mecánico (Clockwork Cheese)
- Short name: Alba
- Founded: 1 June 1939; 87 years ago (as Albacete Foot-ball Association)
- Stadium: Estadio Carlos Belmonte
- Capacity: 17,524
- Owner: Skyline International
- President: Georges Kabchi
- Head coach: Joseba Etxeberria
- League: Segunda División
- 2025–26: Segunda División, 12th of 22
- Website: albacetebalompie.es
| Home colours | Away colours |

Albacete Balompié is a Spanish football team based in Albacete, in the autonomous community of Castile–La Mancha. Founded on 1 June 1939, it currently plays in Segunda División, the second tier of Spanish football, holding home matches at Estadio Carlos Belmonte, with a capacity of 17,524.

== History ==
Chart of Albacete Balompié league performance 1929–present

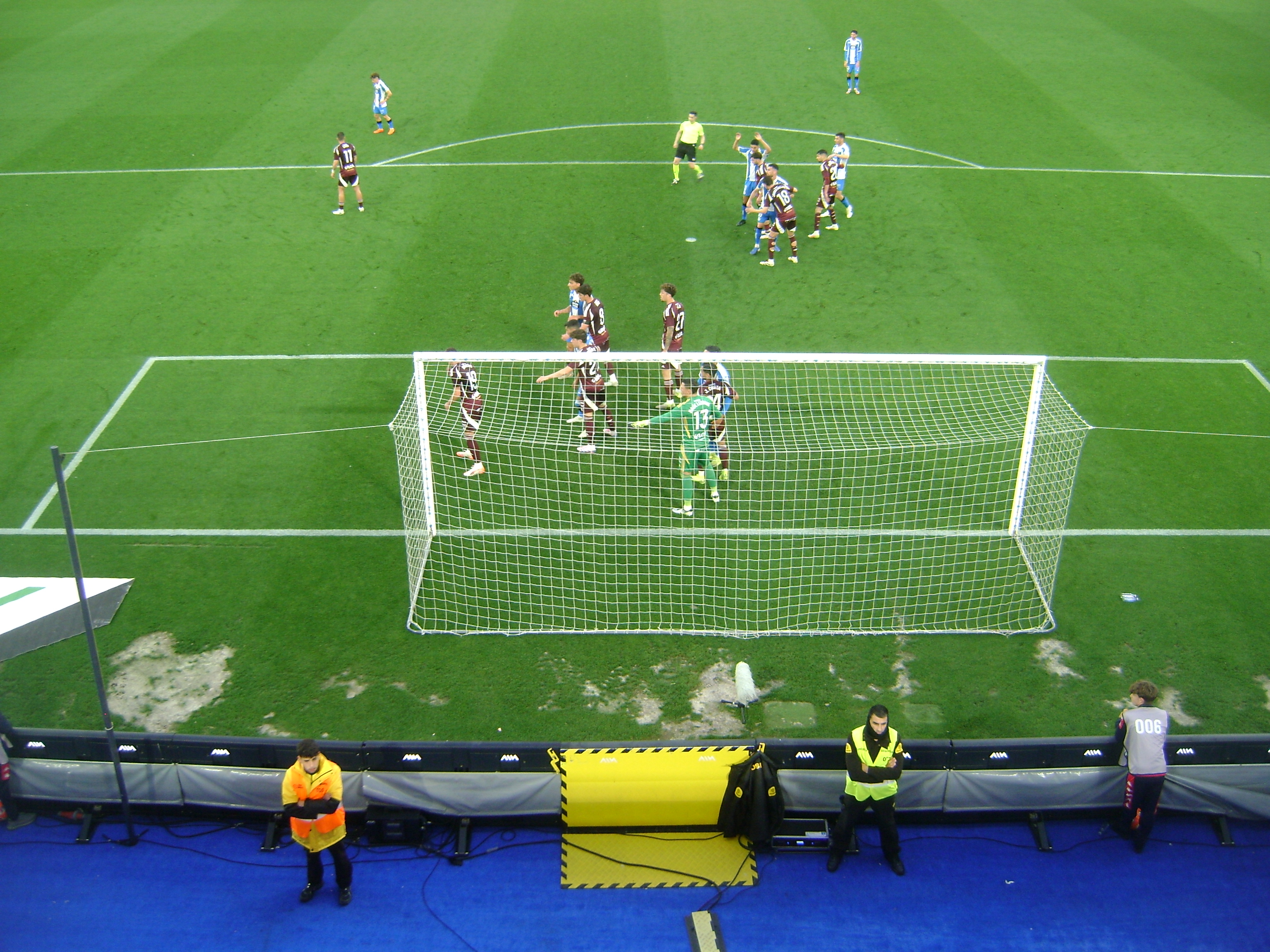
Deportivo de La Coruña vs. Albacete Balompié.

=== Predecessor teams ===
There are records of the simultaneous foundation of two clubs, La Normal and La Liga, two entities that began to promote the practice of this sport in the city at the beginning of the 20th century. Throughout 1917, thanks to Franklin Albricias Goetz, a teacher and pastor of the evangelical church in the Castilian-Manchegan capital, both teams merged into the first football club in the city of Albacete, Club Deportivo Albacete, which would form part of the foundation for what later became Albacete Balompié.

=== Foundation and early years (1939–1989) ===
After years of amateur and regional development of football, it would not appear formally until the end of the Spanish Civil War, due to the merger of 'Club Deportivo Nacional' and 'Albacete Foot-Ball Club'. The club was founded in 1939 under the name Sociedad Deportiva Albacete Foot-ball Association, being later changed due to the forced castellanization of all football names imposed by Francoist Spain in 1941. Albacete debuted in Segunda División in 1949, being relegated due to economic problems, but returning ten years later.

=== Promotions to La Liga (1989–2005) ===
In 1989, Benito Floro consecutively promoted the club from the third division to La Liga, overachieving for a seventh place in the first season in the top level. Floro would later coach Real Madrid, returning to Alba two seasons later as the club was relegated in 1995–96.

After years in the second division facing serious economic and sporting difficulties, Albacete returned to the top flight in the 2002–03 campaign, led by César Ferrando (later of Atlético Madrid). However, Albacete dropped in 2004–05 after posting just 6 wins from 38 matches, going on to stabilize in the subsequent seasons in the second level.

=== Financial struggles and Iniesta's rescue (2010–2013) ===
The 2010–11 season brought two coaching changes, with both Antonio Calderón and David Vidal (who returned to the club only a few months after leaving) being fired, as Albacete returned to the third division after 21 years. That season the club finished last in Segunda División with only 32 points in 42 matches. On 6 December 2011, Andrés Iniesta – who played for the club in his youth before joining Barcelona – became the club's major shareholder, donating €420,000 to the cash-strapped club. The club managed to reach the round of 16 of the 2011–12 Copa del Rey, notably beating Atlético Madrid 3–1 on aggregate.

In March 2013, Agustín Lázaro, chief executive officer (CEO) of Andrés Iniesta's winery enterprise, was appointed as Albacete's chairman. In June, Iniesta loaned the club a further €240,000 to cover unpaid wages, thus preventing its administrative relegation to the fourth tier.

=== Recent years: Instability and Copa del Rey success (2014–present) ===
In 2014, Albacete returned to the Segunda División, but was relegated two seasons later after finishing the season in the 21st position. The club again returned to the Segunda División in the 2016–17 season after winning against Valencia Mestalla in the last round of the promotion play-offs. Albacete finished the 2018–19 season in 4th position of the Segunda División, but then lost to RCD Mallorca in the La Liga play-offs and remained in Segunda División for the 2019–20 season. On next season, Albacete finished last in second division and were relegated to the third division. Thus ending their four-years stay in the second division.

Albacete were promoted to Segunda in the 2021–22 Primera RFEF season playoffs, after defeating Deportivo de La Coruña at the Estadio Riazor. The team came back from a 1–0 deficit, winning 2-1 with a goal in extra time.

On 14 January 2026, Albacete reached the Copa del Rey quarter-finals for the first time since they reached the semi-finals in the 1994–95 season; they won 3–2 against La Liga club Real Madrid (who were runners-up in 2024–25) in the 2025–26 round of 16.

== Seasons ==
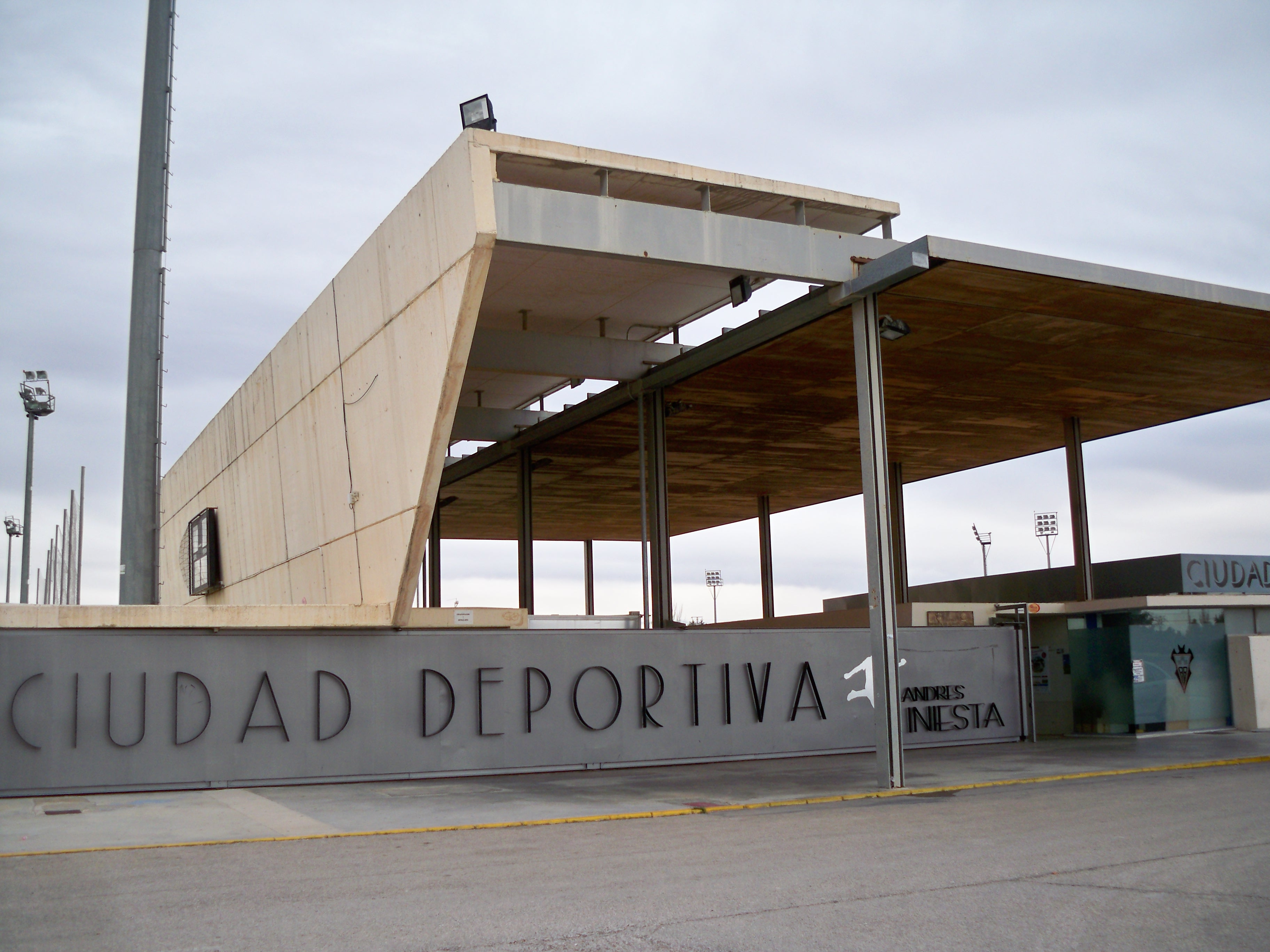
Albacete Balompié "Andrés Iniesta" sports city.

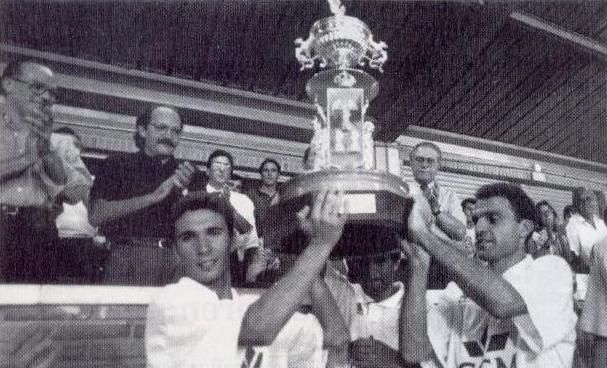
Ciudad de Albacete trophy 1994.

=== Season to season ===
| Season | Tier | Division | Place | Copa del Rey |
|---|---|---|---|---|
| 1940–41 | 4 | 1ª Reg. | 3rd | |
| 1941–42 | 3 | 1ª Reg. | 4th | |
| 1942–43 | 3 | 1ª Reg. | 2nd | |
| 1943–44 | 3 | 3ª | 2nd | |
| 1944–45 | 3 | 3ª | 3rd | |
| 1945–46 | 3 | 3ª | 1st | |
| 1946–47 | 3 | 3ª | 1st | |
| 1947–48 | 3 | 3ª | 3rd | |
| 1948–49 | 3 | 3ª | 1st | |
| 1949–50 | 2 | 2ª | 7th | |
| 1950–51 | 2 | 2ª | 15th | |
| 1951–52 | DNP | | | |
| 1952–53 | 3 | 3ª | 3rd | |
| 1953–54 | 3 | 3ª | 13th | |
| 1954–55 | 3 | 3ª | 7th | |
| 1955–56 | 3 | 3ª | 9th | |
| 1956–57 | 3 | 3ª | 5th | |
| 1957–58 | 3 | 3ª | 5th | |
| 1958–59 | 3 | 3ª | 1st | |
| 1959–60 | 3 | 3ª | 4th | |

| Season | Tier | Division | Place | Copa del Rey |
|---|---|---|---|---|
| 1960–61 | 3 | 3ª | 1st | |
| 1961–62 | 2 | 2ª | 13th | |
| 1962–63 | 3 | 3ª | 4th | |
| 1963–64 | 3 | 3ª | 1st | |
| 1964–65 | 3 | 3ª | 1st | |
| 1965–66 | 3 | 3ª | 3rd | |
| 1966–67 | 3 | 3ª | 2nd | |
| 1967–68 | 3 | 3ª | 4th | |
| 1968–69 | 3 | 3ª | 8th | |
| 1969–70 | 3 | 3ª | 14th | |
| 1970–71 | 4 | 1ª Reg. | 7th | |
| 1971–72 | 4 | Reg. Pref. | 6th | |
| 1972–73 | 4 | Reg. Pref. | 14th | |
| 1973–74 | 4 | Reg. Pref. | 7th | |
| 1974–75 | 4 | Reg. Pref. | 1st | |
| 1975–76 | 3 | 3ª | 17th | First round |
| 1976–77 | 4 | Reg. Pref. | 2nd | |
| 1977–78 | 4 | 3ª | 2nd | First round |
| 1978–79 | 4 | 3ª | 2nd | Second round |
| 1979–80 | 4 | 3ª | 2nd | Second round |

| Season | Tier | Division | Place | Copa del Rey |
|---|---|---|---|---|
| 1980–81 | 4 | 3ª | 2nd | Second round |
| 1981–82 | 4 | 3ª | 1st | First round |
| 1982–83 | 3 | 2ª B | 3rd | First round |
| 1983–84 | 3 | 2ª B | 5th | Second round |
| 1984–85 | 3 | 2ª B | 2nd | Second round |
| 1985–86 | 2 | 2ª | 17th | Second round |
| 1986–87 | 3 | 2ª B | 17th | Fourth round |
| 1987–88 | 3 | 2ª B | 3rd | Third round |
| 1988–89 | 3 | 2ª B | 12th | First round |
| 1989–90 | 3 | 2ª B | 1st | |
| 1990–91 | 2 | 2ª | 1st | Third round |
| 1991–92 | 1 | 1ª | 7th | Third round |
| 1992–93 | 1 | 1ª | 17th | Round of 16 |
| 1993–94 | 1 | 1ª | 13th | Fourth round |
| 1994–95 | 1 | 1ª | 17th | Semi-finals |
| 1995–96 | 1 | 1ª | 20th | First round |
| 1996–97 | 2 | 2ª | 4th | Second round |
| 1997–98 | 2 | 2ª | 14th | Second round |
| 1998–99 | 2 | 2ª | 15th | Second round |
| 1999–2000 | 2 | 2ª | 10th | Second round |

| Season | Tier | Division | Place | Copa del Rey |
|---|---|---|---|---|
| 2000–01 | 2 | 2ª | 5th | Round of 64 |
| 2001–02 | 2 | 2ª | 10th | Round of 32 |
| 2002–03 | 2 | 2ª | 3rd | Round of 64 |
| 2003–04 | 1 | 1ª | 14th | Round of 64 |
| 2004–05 | 1 | 1ª | 20th | Round of 32 |
| 2005–06 | 2 | 2ª | 13th | Third round |
| 2006–07 | 2 | 2ª | 6th | Second round |
| 2007–08 | 2 | 2ª | 12th | Third round |
| 2008–09 | 2 | 2ª | 15th | Third round |
| 2009–10 | 2 | 2ª | 15th | Second round |
| 2010–11 | 2 | 2ª | 22nd | Second round |
| 2011–12 | 3 | 2ª B | 4th | Round of 16 |
| 2012–13 | 3 | 2ª B | 3rd | Second round |
| 2013–14 | 3 | 2ª B | 1st | Second round |
| 2014–15 | 2 | 2ª | 14th | Round of 32 |
| 2015–16 | 2 | 2ª | 21st | Second round |
| 2016–17 | 3 | 2ª B | 1st | Third round |
| 2017–18 | 2 | 2ª | 17th | Second round |
| 2018–19 | 2 | 2ª | 4th | Second round |
| 2019–20 | 2 | 2ª | 17th | Second round |

| Season | Tier | Division | Place | Copa del Rey |
|---|---|---|---|---|
| 2020–21 | 2 | 2ª | 22nd | First round |
| 2021–22 | 3 | 1ª RFEF | 3rd | Second round |
| 2022–23 | 2 | 2ª | 6th | Second round |
| 2023–24 | 2 | 2ª | 13th | First round |
| 2024–25 | 2 | 2ª | 10th | First round |
| 2025–26 | 2 | 2ª | 12th | Quarter-finals |
| 2026–27 | 2 | 2ª | | TBD |

- 7 seasons in La Liga
- 29 seasons in Segunda División
- 1 season in Primera División RFEF
- 11 seasons in Segunda División B
- 29 seasons in Tercera División
- 9 seasons in Categorías Regionales

== Current squad ==
As of 7 September 2026

Note: Flags indicate national team as defined under FIFA eligibility rules; some limited exceptions apply. Players may hold more than one non-FIFA nationality.

| No. | Pos. | Nation | Player |
|---|---|---|---|
| 1 | GK | ESP | Carlos Marín |
| 2 | DF | ESP | Lorenzo Aguado |
| 4 | MF | ESP | Agus Medina (3rd captain) |
| 5 | DF | ESP | Javi Moreno |
| 6 | MF | ESP | Antonio Pacheco |
| 7 | FW | ESP | Antonio Puertas |
| 8 | MF | ESP | Javi Villar |
| 9 | FW | ESP | Mario Soberón |
| 10 | MF | ESP | Rober González |
| 11 | FW | ESP | Víctor Valverde |
| 12 | FW | ESP | Higinio Marín (captain) |
| 13 | GK | ESP | Diego Mariño |
| 14 | MF | ESP | Víctor San Bartolomé |

| No. | Pos. | Nation | Player |
|---|---|---|---|
| 15 | DF | ESP | Fran Gámez |
| 16 | FW | MAR | Munir El Haddadi |
| 17 | MF | ESP | José Corpas |
| 18 | MF | ESP | Sergio Ortuño |
| 19 | FW | ESP | Álex Rubio |
| 20 | FW | GHA | Samuel Obeng |
| 21 | DF | ESP | Carlos Neva (vice-captain) |
| 22 | DF | ESP | Lluís López (4th captain) |
| 23 | DF | ESP | Pepe Sánchez (5th captain) |
| 24 | DF | ESP | Jesús Vallejo |
| 27 | DF | ESP | Dani Bernabéu |
| 32 | FW | URU | Agustín Albarracín (on loan from Cagliari) |

=== Reserve team ===
Note: Flags indicate national team as defined under FIFA eligibility rules; some limited exceptions apply. Players may hold more than one non-FIFA nationality.

| No. | Pos. | Nation | Player |
|---|---|---|---|
| 26 | MF | ESP | Capi |
| 28 | DF | ESP | Toni Velilla |
| 33 | FW | ESP | Tomás Inglés |
| 34 | DF | ESP | Vicente Vidal |
| 35 | FW | ESP | Miguel Scott |

| No. | Pos. | Nation | Player |
|---|---|---|---|
| 38 | MF | ESP | Diego Rodríguez |
| 39 | FW | ESP | Fabio García-Moreno |
| 40 | DF | ESP | Jota Domingo |
| 44 | MF | ESP | Antonio David |

=== Out on loan ===
Note: Flags indicate national team as defined under FIFA eligibility rules; some limited exceptions apply. Players may hold more than one non-FIFA nationality.

| No. | Pos. | Nation | Player |
|---|---|---|---|
| — | FW | VEN | Jovanny Bolívar (at Kalamata until 30 June 2027) |
| — | FW | ECU | Kavier Ortiz (at Metropolitanos until 31 December 2026) |

=== Current technical staff ===
| Position | Staff |
|---|---|
| Head coach | (Spain) Alberto González |
| Assistant coach | (Spain) Enrique González |
| Goalkeeping coach | (Spain) Carlos Cano |
| Analyst | (Spain) Fran Noguerol |
| Fitness coach | (Spain) Juanjo Rico (Spain) Javier Suárez |
| Team delegate | (Spain) José Manuel León |
| Field delegate | (Spain) José Manuel Fernández Miranda |
| Equipment manager | (Spain) Cristian Martínez (Spain) Alberto Rodenas |
| Director of medical services | (Spain) Juan Pérez Martínez |
| Rehab fitness coach | (Spain) José Luis Ibáñez Mancebo |
| Physiotherapist | (Spain) Juanfer Pardo (Spain) Daniel Serrano (Spain) Gabriel García |
| Nutritionist | (Spain) Ángel Moreno |

Last updated: 18 August 2025
Source: Albacete Balompié (in Spanish)

== Honours ==
- Segunda División: (1) 1990–91
- Segunda División B: (2) 1989–90, 2013–14, 2016–17
- Tercera División: (8) 1945–46, 1946–47, 1948–49, 1958–59, 1960–61, 1963–64, 1964–65, 1981–82
- La Liga promotion: (2) 1990–91, 2002–03
- Segunda División promotion: (2) 1984–85, 1989–90
- Copa de la Liga winners: (2) 1982–83 Segunda División B – Group II, 1984–85 Segunda División B – Group II

== Stadium ==
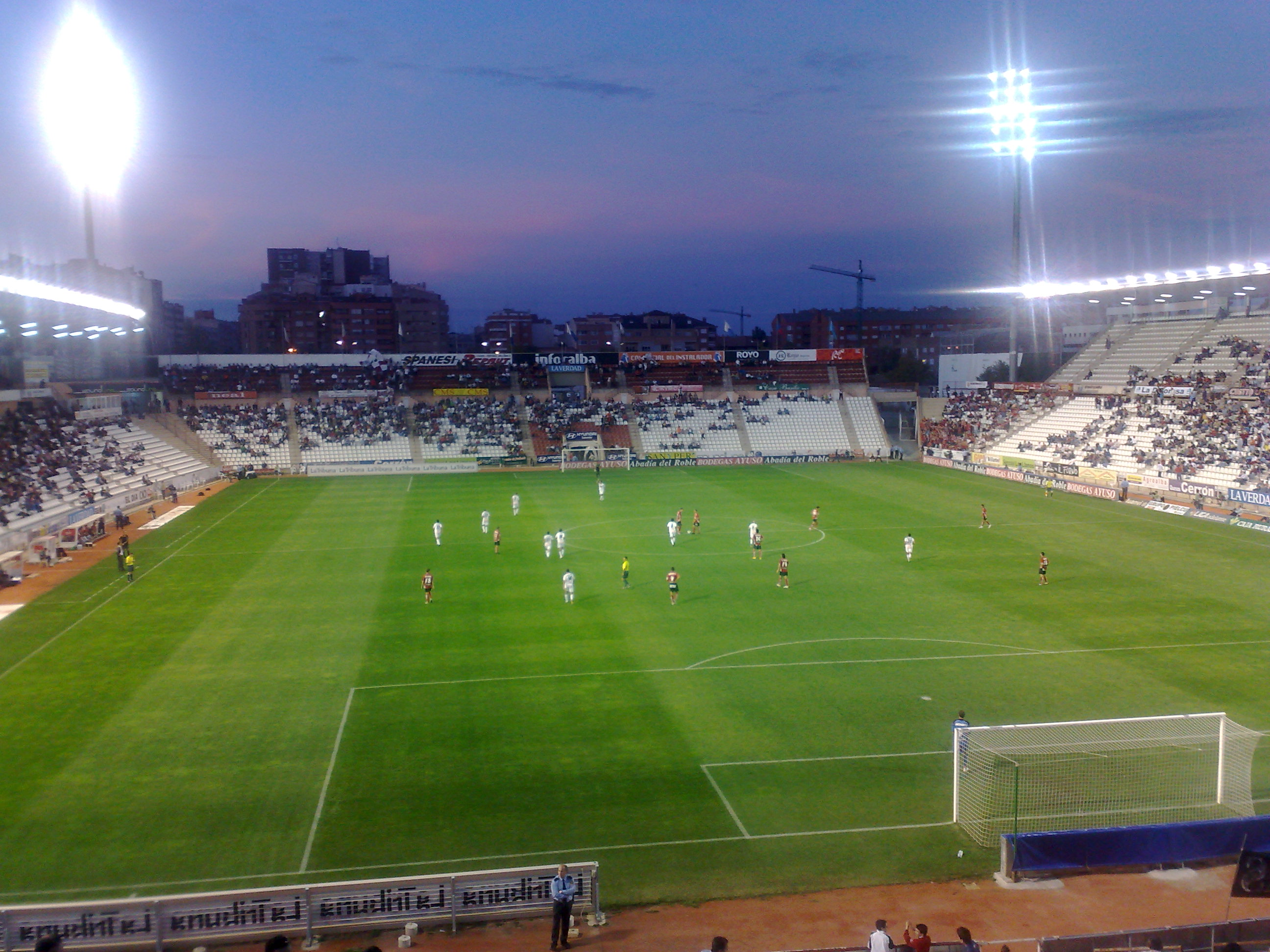
Estadio Carlos Belmonte

The club plays its home matches at the Estadio Carlos Belmonte, which has an all-seated capacity of 17,524. Originally built in 1960, the stadium underwent two major redevelopments, the last being in 1998.

== International players ==
- (Argentina) Óscar Dertycia
- (Argentina) Carlos Roa
- (Australia) Andy Bernal
- (Azerbaijan) Vali Gasimov
- (Belgium) Ronny Gaspercic
- (Bolivia) Marco Etcheverry
- (Brazil) Zago
- (Bulgaria) Ivaylo Andonov
- (Cameroon) Albert Meyong
- (Cameroon) Christian Kofane
- (Chile) Mark González
- (Costa Rica) Danny Carvajal
- (Costa Rica) Luis Conejo
- (Costa Rica) Keylor Navas
- (Croatia) Nenad Bjelica
- (Croatia) Ivan Jurić
- (Democratic Republic of the Congo) Trésor Kandol
- (Equatorial Guinea) Javier Balboa
- (Morocco) Rachid Rokki
- (Niger) Moussa Yahaya
- (Nigeria) Abass Lawal
- (Panama) Rommel Fernández
- (Paraguay) Nelson Cuevas
- (Spain) Andrés Iniesta
- (Spain) Fernando Morientes
- (Romania) Cătălin Munteanu
- (Ukraine) Roman Zozulya
- (Uruguay) Joe Bizera
- (Uruguay) Darío Delgado
- (Uruguay) Nicolás Olivera
- (Uruguay) Antonio Pacheco
- (Uruguay) Horacio Peralta
- (Uruguay) José Luis Zalazar

== Coaches ==
- (Uruguay) Dagoberto Moll (1960–61)
- (Spain) Enrique Orizaola (1976–78)
- (Spain) Máximo Hernández (1979–80)
- (Uruguay) Ignacio Bergara (1981–84)
- (Spain) Julián Rubio (1984–85)
- (Spain) Pachín (1985–86)
- (Spain) Pepe Carcelén (1988–89)
- (Spain) Julián Rubio (1989)
- (Spain) Benito Floro (1989–92)
- (Spain) Julián Rubio (1992)
- (Spain) Ginés Meléndez (interim) (1992)
- (Uruguay) Víctor Espárrago (1992–94)
- (Spain) Luis Suárez (1994)
- (Spain) Ginés Meléndez (interim) (1994)
- (Spain) Benito Floro (1994–96)
- (Spain) Iñaki Sáez (1996)
- (Spain) Manolo Jiménez (1996)
- (Spain) Mariano García Remón (1996–97)
- (Spain) Luis Sánchez Duque (1997)
- (Spain) Ginés Meléndez (1998)
- (Italy) Luigi Maifredi (1998–99)
- (Spain) Julián Rubio (1999–01)
- (Spain) Paco Herrera (2001–02)
- (Philippines) César Ferrando (2002–04)
- (Spain) José González (2004–05)
- (Spain) César Ferrando (2005–07)
- (Spain) Quique Hernández (2007–08)
- (Spain) Máximo Hernández (2008)
- (Spain) Juan Ignacio Martínez (2008–09)
- (Spain) Máximo Hernández (2009)
- (Spain) José Murcia (2009)
- (Spain) Julián Rubio (2009–10)
- (Spain) David Vidal (2010)
- (Spain) Antonio Calderón (2010–11)
- (Spain) David Vidal (2011)
- (Spain) Mario Simón (2011)
- (Spain) Antonio Gómez (2011–13)
- (Spain) Luis César (2013–16)
- (Spain) César Ferrando (2016)
- (Spain) José Manuel Aira (2016–17)
- (Spain) Enrique Martín Monreal (2017–18)
- (Spain) Luis Miguel Ramis (2018–20)
- (Spain) Lucas Alcaraz (2020)
- (Spain) Aritz López Garai (2020–)

== See also ==
- Atlético Albacete, Albacete Balompié's reserve team
- Fundación Albacete, Albacete Balompié's women's team.
- Albacete FS, a futsal club from the same city.
