= Atlético Albacete =

Association football club in Spain

- Full name: Club Atlético Albacete
- Nicknames: Queso Mecánico (The clockwork cheese)
- Founded: 1962; 64 years ago
- Ground: Ciudad Deportiva Andrés Iniesta
- Capacity: 3,000
- President: Georges Kabchi
- Head coach: Ricardo Fajardo
- League: Segunda Federación – Group 5
- 2025–26: Tercera Federación – Group 18, 4th of 18 (promoted via play-offs)
Home colours	Away colours

Club Atlético Albacete is a Spanish football team based in Albacete, in the autonomous community of Castile-La Mancha. Founded in 1962, they are the reserve team of Albacete Balompié and currently play in Segunda Federación – Group 5, holding home games at Ciudad Deportiva Andrés Iniesta, with a capacity of 3,000 seats.

== History ==
Founded in 1962 as Botas Iñiguez CF, the club started an affiliation with Albacete Balompié in 1974, being their farm team and then playing with the name of Atlético Albacete. From 1998 to 2018, it played with the name of Albacete "B" before returning to their previous name.

On 10 October 2019, Atlético Albacete appointed Mario Simón, a manager who had already coached the first team, as their new head coach.

== Season to season ==
- As an independent club, Botas Iñiguez CF

Season	Tier	Division	Place	Copa del Rey
1972–73	6	2ª Reg.	5th	
1973–74	6	2ª Reg.	3rd	

- As an independent club, Club Atlético de Albacete

Season	Tier	Division	Place	Copa del Rey
1974–75	5	1ª Reg.	1st	
1975–76	4	Reg. Pref.	20th	
1976–77	4	Reg. Pref.	17th	
1977–78	5	Reg. Pref.	15th	
1978–79	5	Reg. Pref.	18th	
1979–80	5	Reg. Pref.	20th	
1980–81	5	Reg. Pref.	7th	
1981–82	5	Reg. Pref.	14th	
1982–83	5	Reg. Pref.	3rd	

Season	Tier	Division	Place	Copa del Rey
1983–84	4	3ª	16th	
1984–85	4	3ª	16th	
1985–86	4	3ª	12th	
1986–87	4	3ª	20th	
1987–88	5	Reg. Pref.	11th	
1988–89	5	Reg. Pref.	5th	
1989–90	5	Reg. Pref.	2nd	
1990–91	4	3ª	7th	N/A

- As the reserve team of Albacete Balompié

Season	Tier	Division	Place
1991–92	4	3ª	7th
1992–93	4	3ª	9th
1993–94	4	3ª	8th
1994–95	DNP		
1995–96	DNP		
1996–97	5	1ª Aut.	1st
1997–98	5	1ª Aut.	1st
1998–99	4	3ª	4th
1999–2000	4	3ª	2nd
2000–01	4	3ª	6th
2001–02	4	3ª	2nd
2002–03	4	3ª	11th
2003–04	4	3ª	9th
2004–05	4	3ª	2nd
2005–06	4	3ª	5th
2006–07	4	3ª	12th
2007–08	4	3ª	6th
2008–09	4	3ª	15th
2009–10	4	3ª	5th
2010–11	4	3ª	2nd

Season	Tier	Division	Place
2011–12	4	3ª	4th
2012–13	4	3ª	10th
2013–14	4	3ª	13th
2014–15	4	3ª	14th
2015–16	4	3ª	14th
2016–17	4	3ª	15th
2017–18	4	3ª	5th
2018–19	4	3ª	5th
2019–20	4	3ª	9th
2020–21	4	3ª	1st / 4th
2021–22	5	3ª RFEF	12th
2022–23	6	Aut. Pref.	1st
2023–24	5	3ª Fed.	9th
2024–25	5	3ª Fed.	2nd
2025–26	5	3ª Fed.	4th
2026–27	4	2ª Fed.	

- 1 season in Segunda Federación
- 31 seasons in Tercera División
- 4 seasons in Tercera Federación/Tercera División RFEF

== Current squad ==
As of 7 September 2026

Note: Flags indicate national team as defined under FIFA eligibility rules; some limited exceptions apply. Players may hold more than one non-FIFA nationality.

No.	Pos.	Nation	Player
1	GK	ESP	Mario Ramos
2	DF	ESP	Jota Domingo
3	DF	ESP	Dani Bernabéu
4	DF	ESP	Vicente Vidal
5	DF	ESP	Toni Velilla
6	MF	ESP	Diego Rodríguez
7	FW	ESP	Fran Parra
8	MF	ESP	Alonso Chillerón
9	FW	ESP	Tomás Inglés
10	MF	ESP	Capi
11	FW	ESP	Adrián Rosell
12	DF	ESP	Sergi Juan

No.	Pos.	Nation	Player
13	GK	ESP	Brais Suárez
14	MF	ESP	Antonio David
16	DF	ESP	Diego García
17	FW	ESP	Rubén Martínez
18	DF	ESP	Pedro Luque
19	FW	ESP	Pablo Trigo
20	FW	ESP	Alberto Morientes
21	FW	ESP	Marc Torra
22	DF	ESP	David Jerez
23	MF	ESP	Hugo Busto
24	MF	ESP	Javi Navarro

=== From Youth Academy ===
Note: Flags indicate national team as defined under FIFA eligibility rules; some limited exceptions apply. Players may hold more than one non-FIFA nationality.

No.	Pos.	Nation	Player
27	FW	ESP	Fabio García-Moreno
29	FW	ESP	Miguel Scott

No.	Pos.	Nation	Player
30	DF	ESP	Luis López
