= Pablo Arana =

Spanish footballer (born 2006)

Personal information
- Full name: Pablo Arana Gómez
- Date of birth: 11 February 2006 (age 20)
- Place of birth: Jerez de la Frontera, Spain
- Position: Winger

Team information
- Current team: Antoniano

Youth career
- 2012–2016: Xerez Distrito Norte
- 2016–2018: Veteranos Xerez
- 2018–2020: Cádiz
- 2020–2022: Fundación Cádiz
- 2022: Balón de Cádiz
- 2022–2024: Sanluqueño
- 2024: → Cádiz (loan)
- 2024–2025: Cádiz

Senior career*
Years	Team	Apps	(Gls)
2023–2024	Sanluqueño	5	(0)
2024–2025	Cádiz C	4	(3)
2025–2026	Cádiz B	24	(0)
2026	Cádiz	1	(0)
2026–	Antoniano	0	(0)

International career
2023	Spain U18	1	(0)
- * Club domestic league appearances and goals as of 31 May 2026

Pablo Arana Gómez (born 11 February 2006) is a Spanish footballer who plays as a left winger for CA Antoniano.

== Club career ==
Born in Jerez de la Frontera, Cádiz, Andalusia, Arana began his career with CD Xerez Distrito Norte, and represented Veteranos Xerez CD before joining Cádiz CF in 2018. In 2022, he moved to Atlético Sanluqueño CF, and made his first team debut on 27 August 2023, playing the last 14 minutes in a 3–1 Primera Federación away loss to CD Alcoyano.

On 4 September 2023, Arana renewed his contract with Sanluqueño for a further four seasons. The following 29 January, however, he returned to Cádiz on loan, initially for the Juvenil squad.

In the following years, Arana appeared for Cádiz's C and B-teams before making his professional debut on 31 May 2026, coming on as a late substitute for fellow youth graduate José Antonio de la Rosa in a 4–1 Segunda División away loss to Racing de Santander. On 6 August, he was transferred to Segunda Federación side CA Antoniano.

== International career ==
In October 2023, Arana was called up to the Spain national under-18 team.
