= Alejandro Viedma =

Spanish footballer

Personal information
- Full name: Alejandro Viedma Vega
- Date of birth: 16 April 1999 (age 27)
- Place of birth: Jaén, Spain
- Height: 1.75 m (5 ft 9 in)
- Position: Midfielder

Team information
- Current team: Atlético Sanluqueño
- Number: 16

Youth career
- Atlético Jaén
- Jaén
- 2010–2011: Sevilla
- 2011–2016: Barcelona
- 2016–2018: Sevilla

Senior career*
Years	Team	Apps	(Gls)
2017–2019	Sevilla B	13	(0)
2019–2020	Granada B	22	(1)
2020	Cádiz B	3	(0)
2020–2021	Ponferradina	5	(0)
2021–2022	Córdoba	19	(0)
2022–2023	Ciudad Lucena	11	(0)
2023	Ugento		
2024	Huétor Tájar	11	(0)
2024	Ugento		
2025	Atlético Onubense	8	(2)
2025–2026	Recreativo	3	(0)
2026–	Atlético Sanluqueño	11	(0)
- * Club domestic league appearances and goals as of 10 June 2026

Alejandro Viedma Vega (born 16 April 1999) is a Spanish professional footballer who plays for Primera Federación club Atlético Sanluqueño as a central midfielder.

== Club career ==
Born in Jaén, Andalusia, Viedma joined FC Barcelona's youth setup in 2011, after representing Sevilla FC, Real Jaén and Atlético Jaén FC. On 13 July 2016 he returned to Sevilla, after agreeing to a two-year deal, and was assigned to the Juvenil A squad.

On 21 December 2017, Viedma made his professional debut with the reserves by coming on as a late substitute for José Alonso Lara in a 0–3 Segunda División away loss against CD Numancia. On 30 January 2019, he moved to another reserve team, Club Recreativo Granada in Segunda División B.

Viedma scored his first senior goal on 23 February 2019, netting his team's only in a 1–2 home loss against his former side Sevilla Atlético. The following 31 January, he signed for Cádiz CF and was assigned to the B-team also in division three.

On 10 September 2020, Viedma was transferred to SD Ponferradina; Cádiz retained a percentage over a future sale. The following 2 July, after featuring rarely, he moved to Segunda División RFEF side Córdoba CF on a one-year deal.

== Personal life ==
Viedma's father Juan Antonio was also a footballer and a midfielder. He never appeared in any higher than the third tier.
