= Agustín Juárez =

Agustín Juárez may refer to:

- Agustín Juárez (cyclist) (1943–2024), Mexican cyclist
- Agustín Juárez (footballer) (born 2005), Argentine footballer

== See also ==
- Agustín Suárez (born 1997), Argentine footballer
