= Rafał Jędrszczyk =

Polish football manager

Personal information
- Date of birth: 26 October 1978 (age 48)
- Place of birth: Kraków, Poland
- Height: 1.83 m (6 ft 0 in)
- Position: Defender

Team information
- Current team: Wieczysta Kraków II; Wieczysta Kraków (assistant)

Youth career
- 1996–1998: Wisła Kraków

Senior career*
Years	Team	Apps	(Gls)
1998–1999	Wisła Kraków II		
1999–2000	Górnik Wieliczka		
2000–2004	Proszowianka Proszowice		
2004–2008	Kmita Zabierzów		
2008–2010	Sandecja Nowy Sącz	38	(0)
2010–2011	Kolejarz Stróże	4	(0)
2011	Szreniawa Nowy Wiśnicz		
2011–2012	AP 2011 Zabierzów		

Managerial career
- 2011–2013: AP 2011 Zabierzów
- 2013–2017: Skawinka Skawina
- 2018–2019: Wiślanka Grabie
- 2021: Wieczysta Kraków (interim)
- 2022: Wieczysta Kraków (caretaker)
- 2025: Wieczysta Kraków (caretaker)
- 2025: Wieczysta Kraków II
- 2025: Wieczysta Kraków (caretaker)
- 2026–: Wieczysta Kraków II
- * Club domestic league appearances and goals

Rafał Jędrszczyk (born 26 October 1978) is a Polish professional football manager and former player. He is currently in charge of III liga club Wieczysta Kraków II, and serves as the assistant manager of Wieczysta's senior team.

== Career ==
As a semi-professional player, he played as a defender for several clubs in the Lesser Poland region, including Sandecja Nowy Sącz and Kmita Zabierzów.

After retiring as a player, Jędrszczyk transitioned into coaching. He has coached several teams, including AP 2011 Zabierzów, Skawinka Skawina, and Wiślanka Grabie. He also served as an assistant coach at Wieczysta Kraków and has taken on the role of caretaker or interim head coach for the club four times, most recently on 3 November 2025, replacing Gino Lettieri.

At the start of the 2025–26 season, Jędrszczyk was appointed as manager of Wieczysta's reserves, playing in the fifth tier. On 18 October 2025, he was moved back to the role of assistant manager of the senior team.

== Managerial statistics ==
As of match played 15 November 2026

Managerial record by team and tenure
Team	From	To	Record							
Team	From	To	G	W	D	L	GF	GA	GD	Win %
Wiślanka Grabie	4 September 2018	8 May 2019	22	7	7	8	42	33	+9	31.82
Wieczysta Kraków (interim)	3 June 2021	30 June 2021	6	6	0	0	38	2	+36	100.00
Wieczysta Kraków (caretaker)	29 August 2022	6 September 2022	2	1	0	1	2	2	+0	50.00
Wieczysta Kraków (caretaker)	18 April 2025	1 May 2025	1	0	0	1	0	1	−1	0.00
Wieczysta Kraków II	1 July 2025	18 October 2025	18	11	4	3	63	26	+37	61.11
Wieczysta Kraków (caretaker)	3 November 2025	24 November 2025	2	1	0	1	3	3	+0	50.00
Wieczysta Kraków II	15 September 2026	Present	13	7	3	3	18	12	+6	53.85
Total			64	33	14	17	166	79	+87	51.56

== Honours ==
=== Player ===
Kmita Zabierzów

- III liga, group IV: 2005–06

=== Managerial ===
Skawinka Skawina

- Regional league Kraków II: 2014–15

Wieczysta Kraków

- Regional league Kraków II: 2020–21
- Polish Cup (Lesser Poland regionals): 2020–21

Wieczysta Kraków II

- Polish Cup (Kraków regionals): 2026–27
