= Marcin Juszczyk =

Polish footballer (born 1985)

Personal information
- Full name: Marcin Michał Juszczyk
- Date of birth: 23 January 1985 (age 41)
- Place of birth: Kraków, Poland
- Height: 1.86 m (6 ft 1 in)
- Position: Goalkeeper

Senior career*
Years	Team	Apps	(Gls)
2001	Wisła Kraków II		
2002	→ LKS Niedźwiedź (loan)		
2002–2008	Wisła Kraków	5	(0)
2003–2004	→ Górnik Wieliczka (loan)		
2007	→ Górnik Wieliczka (loan)		
2009	Nea Salamis	14	(0)
2010	Wisła Kraków	6	(0)
2010–2011	Polonia Bytom	15	(0)
2011	Arka Gdynia	15	(0)
2012	Arka Gdynia II		
2014	Poroniec Poronin	11	(0)

International career
2002	Poland U17		
2004	Poland U19		
- * Club domestic league appearances and goals

Marcin Michał Juszczyk (born 23 January 1985) is a Polish former professional footballer who played as a goalkeeper.

== Career ==
=== Club ===
Juszczyk played for clubs such as Górnik Wieliczka, Nea Salamis Famagusta FC and Wisła Kraków.

In July 2011, he joined Arka Gdynia.

== Honours ==
Wisła Kraków

- Ekstraklasa: 2004–05, 2007–08
