= José Mejías =

Spanish footballer

Pepe Mejías
Personal information
- Full name: José Manuel Mejías López
- Date of birth: 21 January 1959 (age 67)
- Place of birth: Cádiz, Spain
- Height: 1.74 m (5 ft 9 in)
- Position: Attacking midfielder

Youth career
- Cádiz

Senior career*
Years	Team	Apps	(Gls)
1976–1977	Cádiz B		
1977–1986	Cádiz	248	(61)
1977–1978	→ Jerez Industrial (loan)		
1986–1988	Zaragoza	60	(8)
1988–1989	Murcia	39	(9)
1989–1990	Rayo Vallecano	21	(3)
1990–1992	Cádiz	56	(6)
1992–1993	Elche	38	(11)
1993–1994	San Fernando		
1994–1995	Conil		
Total		462	(98)

International career
1985	Spain U21	1	(0)
- * Club domestic league appearances and goals

José Manuel 'Pepe' Mejías López (born 21 January 1959) is a Spanish retired professional footballer who played as an attacking midfielder.

His career was closely associated to Cádiz, for which he appeared in 304 games across both major levels of Spanish football, scoring 66 goals.

In La Liga, Mejía also represented Zaragoza, Murcia and Rayo Vallecano, totalling 263 matches and 42 goals in the competition over ten seasons.

== Club career ==
Born in Cádiz, Andalusia, Mejías spent most of his 19-year senior career with Cádiz CF. After starting out with the reserves he was loaned to neighbouring amateurs Jerez Industrial CF, returning in January 1978 and going on to remain with his main club a further eight full seasons; he made his La Liga debut on 9 April 1978, playing the full 90 minutes in a 2–4 home loss against RCD Español.

During his first spell, Mejías constantly alternated between the top division and the Segunda División, promoting three times to the former and being relegated to the latter in 1982 and 1984. In the 1982–83 campaign he scored a career-best 15 goals, helping the Gaditanos return to the top flight.

Mejías left Cádiz in the summer of 1986, joining Real Zaragoza in the same league. He continued to compete at that level the following years, with Real Murcia CF (also started 1989–90 with the side in the second tier) and Rayo Vallecano; he appeared with Zaragoza in the 1986–87 European Cup Winners' Cup, netting once in seven games – the 2–0 away victory over Vitosha Sofia– to help the Aragonese team to reach the semi-finals.

After two more seasons with Cádiz in division two, 33-year-old Mejías retired from professional football and moved to the lower leagues, retiring three years later.

== Personal life ==
Mejías' younger brother, Salvador, was also a footballer. They coincided in several teams during their careers.
