= Salvador Mejías =

Spanish footballer

Salva Mejías
Personal information
- Full name: Salvador Mejías López
- Date of birth: 26 April 1963 (age 63)
- Place of birth: Cádiz, Spain
- Height: 1.70 m (5 ft 7 in)
- Position: Forward

Youth career
- Cádiz

Senior career*
| Years | Team | Apps | (Gls) |
| 1982–1983 | Cádiz B | | |
| 1982 | → San Fernando (loan) | 7 | (0) |
| 1983–1986 | Cádiz | 104 | (31) |
| 1986–1990 | Murcia | 109 | (21) |
| 1990–1991 | Celta | 25 | (2) |
| 1992–1993 | Elche | 36 | (8) |
| 1993–1994 | San Fernando | | |
| Total | | 281 | (62) |

International career
| 1983–1985 | Spain U21 | 3 | (0) |
- * Club domestic league appearances and goals

Salvador 'Salva' Mejías López (born 26 April 1963 in Cádiz, Andalusia) is a Spanish former professional footballer who played as a forward. His older brother José was also a footballer, and they coincided in several clubs during their careers.
