= Atlético Sanluqueño CF =

Association football club

Coordinates: 36.766951°N 6.347704°W

Atlético Sanluqueño
- Full name: Atlético Sanluqueño; Club de Fútbol
- Nicknames: Atletistas; Verdiblancos
- Founded: 1948; 78 years ago
- Ground: El Palmar, Sanlúcar de Barrameda, Andalusia, Spain
- Capacity: 5,000
- President: Juan Cala
- Head coach: Pedro Mateos
- League: Segunda Federación – Group 4
- 2025–26: Primera Federación – Group 2, 19th of 20 (relegated)
- Website: atleticosanluquenocf.com
Home colours	Away colours

Atlético Sanluqueño Club de Fútbol is a Spanish football team based in Sanlúcar de Barrameda, Province of Cádiz, in the autonomous community of Andalusia. Founded in 1948, although its registration in official competitions took place in 1951. It plays in Segunda Federación – Group 4, holding home games at Estadio El Palmar, with a capacity of 5,000 seats.

== History ==
On 11 January 1951 the club was founded with Rafael Bartel Velázquez as its president. Ricardo Jiménez González became the secretary of the club.

The club is a feeder team for Cádiz CF Mirandilla, and is often treated as the C level squad by the club.

== Season to season ==
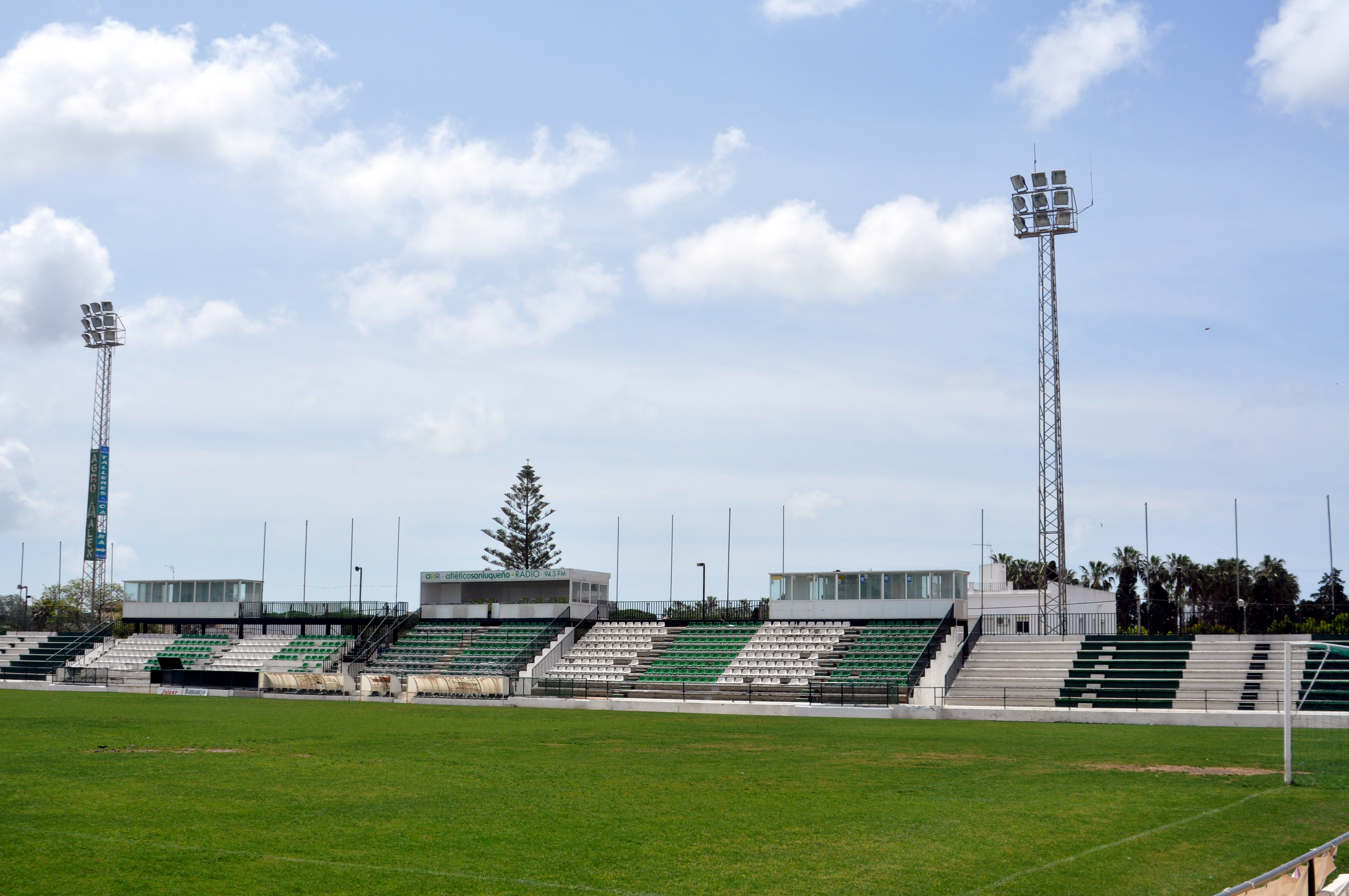
Estadio El Palmar

Season	Tier	Division	Place	Copa del Rey
1948–1956	—	Regional	—	
1956–57	4	1ª Reg.	6th	
1957–58	4	1ª Reg.	1st	
1958–59	3	3ª	15th	
1959–60	3	3ª	6th	
1960–61	3	3ª	16th	
1961–62	4	1ª Reg.		
1962–63	4	1ª Reg.		
1963–64	4	1ª Reg.		
1964–65	4	1ª Reg.		
1965–66	3	3ª	10th	
1966–67	3	3ª	8th	
1967–68	3	3ª	8th	
1968–69	3	3ª	15th	
1969–70	3	3ª	16th	
1970–71	4	Reg. Pref.	10th	
1971–72	4	Reg. Pref.	19th	
1972–73	5	1ª Reg.	7th	
1973–74	5	1ª Reg.	4th	
1974–75	5	1ª Reg.	2nd	

Season	Tier	Division	Place	Copa del Rey
1975–76	5	1ª Reg.	11th	
1976–77	5	1ª Reg.	4th	
1977–78	5	Reg. Pref.	7th	
1978–79	5	Reg. Pref.	4th	
1979–80	5	Reg. Pref.	2nd	
1980–81	4	3ª	3rd	
1981–82	4	3ª	12th	
1982–83	4	3ª	19th	
1983–84	4	3ª	3rd	
1984–85	4	3ª	11th	
1985–86	4	3ª	4th	
1986–87	4	3ª	3rd	
1987–88	3	2ª B	15th	
1988–89	3	2ª B	3rd	
1989–90	3	2ª B	9th	
1990–91	3	2ª B	13th	
1991–92	3	2ª B	17th	
1992–93	4	3ª	5th	
1993–94	4	3ª	7th	
1994–95	4	3ª	12th	

Season	Tier	Division	Place	Copa del Rey
1995–96	4	3ª	2nd	
1996–97	4	3ª	8th	
1997–98	4	3ª	15th	
1998–99	4	3ª	8th	
1999–2000	4	3ª	6th	
2000–01	4	3ª	4th	
2001–02	4	3ª	15th	
2002–03	4	3ª	12th	
2003–04	4	3ª	9th	
2004–05	4	3ª	16th	
2005–06	4	3ª	5th	
2006–07	4	3ª	17th	
2007–08	4	3ª	6th	
2008–09	4	3ª	16th	
2009–10	4	3ª	16th	
2010–11	4	3ª	8th	
2011–12	4	3ª	1st	
2012–13	3	2ª B	11th	Second round
2013–14	3	2ª B	19th	
2014–15	4	3ª	4th	

Season	Tier	Division	Place	Copa del Rey
2015–16	4	3ª	2nd	
2016–17	3	2ª B	17th	Second round
2017–18	4	3ª	4th	
2018–19	3	2ª B	13th	
2019–20	3	2ª B	15th	
2020–21	3	2ª B	3rd / 6th	
2021–22	3	1ª RFEF	16th	
2022–23	4	2ª Fed.	4th	
2023–24	3	1ª Fed.	14th	
2024–25	3	1ª Fed.	14th	
2025–26	3	1ª Fed.	19th	
2026–27	4	2ª Fed.		

- 4 seasons in Primera Federación/Primera División RFEF
- 11 seasons in Segunda División B
- 2 seasons in Segunda Federación
- 38 seasons in Tercera División

== Current squad ==
As of 5 February 2026

Note: Flags indicate national team as defined under FIFA eligibility rules; some limited exceptions apply. Players may hold more than one non-FIFA nationality.

No.	Pos.	Nation	Player
1	GK	ESP	Rodrigo Rocafort (on loan from Villarreal C)
2	DF	ESP	Raúl Sola
3	DF	ESP	Julio Cabrera
4	DF	ESP	Samu Almagro (on loan from Cádiz B)
5	FW	ESP	Sergio Niza (on loan from Cádiz B)
6	MF	CIV	Ronald Gbizie
7	DF	ESP	Kikín
8	MF	ZAM	Twizard Mulenga (on loan from Cádiz B)
9	FW	ESP	Ismael Álvarez (on loan from Cádiz)
11	FW	ESP	Luis Simón (on loan from Cádiz B)
12	DF	FRA	Noah Obioma (on loan from Cádiz)
13	GK	ESP	Rubén Domínguez (on loan from Cádiz)
14	DF	ESP	Alejandro Pavón
15	FW	ESP	Marcos Denia (on loan from Cádiz)

No.	Pos.	Nation	Player
16	MF	ESP	Alejandro Viedma
17	FW	ESP	Rodri Val
18	DF	MLI	Boubacar Diallo (on loan from Cádiz)
19	FW	ARG	Agustín Juárez (on loan from Newell's Old Boys)
20	FW	ESP	Usher Lobede (on loan from Cádiz)
21	MF	ESP	Dani Satoca
22	MF	ESP	Raúl López (on loan from Cádiz B)
23	DF	ESP	Adrián Gómez
24	FW	ESP	Iomar Vidal (on loan from Ceuta)
25	MF	ESP	José Andújar
28	DF	ESP	Arnau Bargalló
30	DF	ESP	Pablo Barea (on loan from Cádiz)
-	GK	RUS	Pyotr Kudakovsky
-	FW	ZAM	Francisco Mwepu (on loan from Cádiz)

== Notable players ==
- (Spain) Marc Cardona
- (Spain) Nolito
- (Gibraltar) George Cabrera
- (Spain) Abel Gómez
- (Spain) Dani Güiza
