= Beñat de Jesús =

Spanish footballer (born 2002)

Personal information
- Full name: Beñat de Jesús Domingo
- Date of birth: 22 January 2002 (age 24)
- Place of birth: Larrabetzu, Spain
- Height: 1.78 m (5 ft 10 in)
- Position: Right-back

Team information
- Current team: Cádiz
- Number: 2

Youth career
- 2017–2020: Athletic Bilbao

Senior career*
Years	Team	Apps	(Gls)
2020–2022	Basconia	58	(4)
2022–2024	Bilbao Athletic	12	(0)
2023–2024	→ Barakaldo (loan)	18	(0)
2024–2026	Barakaldo	57	(0)
2026–	Cádiz	1	(0)
- * Club domestic league appearances and goals as of 3 October 2026

Beñat de Jesús Domingo (born 22 January 2002), sometimes known as Deje, is a Spanish professional footballer who plays as a right-back for Cádiz CF.

== Career ==
Born in Larrabetzu, Biscay, Basque Country, de Jesús joined Athletic Bilbao's Lezama Facilities in 2017, aged 15. He was promoted to farm team CD Basconia in May 2020, where he quickly established himself as a starter before becoming a member of the reserves ahead of the 2022–23 season, in Primera Federación.

On 5 July 2023, after featuring rarely, de Jesús was loaned to Segunda Federación side Barakaldo CF for one year. After helping the side to achieve promotion to the third division, he signed a permanent one-year contract with them roughly one year later.

Initially a backup to longtime incumbent Iker Pedernales, de Jesús signed a one-year extension with Baraka on 25 June 2025. On 5 July 2026, he signed a three-year deal with Cádiz CF of the Segunda División.

De Jesús made his professional debut on 3 October 2026, coming on as a late substitute for Juan Díaz in a 4–0 home routing of CD Leganés.
