= Roberto Rosado =

Spanish footballer (born 2008)

Personal information
- Full name: Roberto Rosado Márquez
- Date of birth: 7 February 2008 (age 18)
- Place of birth: Arcos de la Frontera, Spain
- Height: 1.82 m (6 ft 0 in)
- Position: Left-back

Team information
- Current team: Cádiz B
- Number: 3

Youth career
- 2014–2019: Arcos
- 2019–2022: Cádiz
- 2022–2023: Arcos
- 2023–2025: Cádiz

Senior career*
Years	Team	Apps	(Gls)
2025	Cádiz C	3	(0)
2025–	Cádiz B	19	(0)
2026–	Cádiz	1	(0)

International career
2025	Spain U17	3	(0)
- * Club domestic league appearances and goals as of 15 August 2026

Roberto Rosado Márquez (born 7 February 2008) is a Spanish footballer who plays as a left-back for Cádiz CF Mirandilla.

== Club career ==
Born in Arcos de la Frontera, Cádiz, Andalusia, Rosado began his career with hometown side Arcos CF before joining Cádiz CF in 2019. Back to his former club in 2022, he returned to Cádiz in 2023, and renewed his contract until 2027 on 18 December 2024.

After making his senior debut with the C-team in the División de Honor in 2025, Rosado subsequently became a regular starter for the reserves in Tercera Federación. On 15 August 2026, after spending the entire pre-season with the first team, he made his professional debut by coming on as a second-half substitute for fellow debutant Manu Rivera in a 0–0 Segunda División home draw against RC Celta Fortuna.

== International career ==
In February 2025, Rosado was called up to the Spain national under-17 team for the Algarve Tournament; he had been a member of the squad since the previous month.
