= Dawid Pakulski =

Polish footballer (born 1998)

Personal information
- Date of birth: 23 July 1998 (age 28)
- Place of birth: Wałbrzych, Poland
- Height: 1.74 m (5 ft 9 in)
- Position: Midfielder

Team information
- Current team: Wieczysta Kraków II

Youth career
- Górnik Wałbrzych
- 2011–2016: Zagłębie Lubin

Senior career*
Years	Team	Apps	(Gls)
2016–2023	Zagłębie Lubin II	89	(13)
2018–2022	Zagłębie Lubin	38	(2)
2021	→ Motor Lublin (loan)	13	(0)
2023–2025	Wieczysta Kraków	27	(0)
2025–2026	Pogoń Siedlce	7	(0)
2026–	Wieczysta Kraków II	0	(0)
- * Club domestic league appearances and goals as of 20:22, 26 May 2026 (UTC)

Dawid Pakulski (born 23 July 1998) is a Polish professional footballer who plays as a midfielder for III liga club Wieczysta Kraków II.

== Honours ==
Zagłębie Lubin II

- III liga, group III: 2021–22
- IV liga Lower Silesia West: 2016–17
- Polish Cup (Lower Silesia regionals): 2016–17
- Polish Cup (Legnica regionals): 2016–17, 2021–22

Wieczysta Kraków

- III liga, group IV: 2023–24
