= Ismael Álvarez =

Ismael Álvarez may refer to:

- Ismael Álvarez (footballer) (born 2007), Spanish footballer
- Ismael Álvarez (politician) (born 1950), Spanish politician

== See also ==
- Isael Álvarez (born 1974), Cuban boxer
- Ismael Alvariza (1897–?), Brazilian footballer
