= Julio Cabrera =

Julio Cabrera may refer to:

- Julio Cabrera (footballer), a Spanish footballer
- Julio Cabrera (philosopher), an Argentine philosopher living in Brazil
- Julio Cabrera (swimmer), a Spanish swimmer
