= Maciej Musiał (football manager) =

Polish football manager and former player

Personal information
- Date of birth: 8 February 1977 (age 49)
- Height: 1.82 m (5 ft 11 1/2 in)
- Position: Midfielder

Youth career
- Wisła Kraków

Senior career*
| Years | Team | Apps | (Gls) |
| –1998 | Clepardia Kraków | | |
| 1998–1999 | Wieczysta Kraków | | |
| 1999–2000 | MZKS Alwernia | | |
| 2000–2008 | Górnik Wieliczka | | |

Managerial career
- 2009–2010: Górnik Wieliczka
- 2013–2016: Wisła Kraków II
- 2021–2023: Garbarnia Kraków
- 2023: Wieczysta Kraków
- 2024–2025: Hutnik Kraków
- 2025–2026: Stal Stalowa Wola
- * Club domestic league appearances and goals

Maciej Musiał (Polish: [ˈma.t͡ɕɛj ˈmu.ɕaw]; born 8 February 1977) is a Polish professional football manager and former player who played as a midfielder. He was most recently in charge of II liga club Stal Stalowa Wola.

His coaching résumé includes head-coach stints at Garbarnia Kraków, Wieczysta Kraków and Hutnik Kraków, and assistant roles at top-flight clubs such as Wisła Kraków, Pogoń Szczecin, Sandecja Nowy Sącz, ŁKS Łódź and Zagłębie Sosnowiec.

== Playing career ==
Musiał played senior football for lower-league side Górnik Wieliczka between 2001 and 2008, featuring as a midfielder. He also represented Wisła Krakbet Kraków in futsal in the 2000s.

== Coaching career ==
=== Early roles ===
After ending his playing days, Musiał began coaching at Górnik Wieliczka in 2009. In 2012, he joined the first-team staff at Wisła Kraków as assistant coach, later taking charge of the club’s reserve team (2013–2015) and rejoining the senior staff in 2015–2016. He subsequently worked as assistant to Kazimierz Moskal at Pogoń Szczecin (2016–2017), Sandecja Nowy Sącz (2018) and ŁKS Łódź (2018–2020), and later at Zagłębie Sosnowiec (2020–2021).

=== Garbarnia Kraków ===
On 24 June 2021, Musiał was appointed manager of Garbarnia Kraków. He extended his deal in July 2022 after guiding the club to a top-half finish in II liga.

=== Wieczysta Kraków ===
Ahead of the 2023–24 campaign, Musiał took over at Wieczysta Kraków; his tenure ended in September 2023.

=== Hutnik Kraków ===
He was appointed manager of Hutnik Kraków on 27 March 2024 on a deal through the end of 2024–25. Musiał left Hutnik on 19 May 2025 having overseen 42 official matches (league and Polish Cup).

=== Stal Stalowa Wola ===
On 15 October 2025, Musiał was named manager of Stal Stalowa Wola in II liga. Reports indicated a contract running until 30 June 2026, with an option to extend. He was sacked on 27 April 2026, with Stal sitting in 13th.

== Managerial statistics ==
As of match played 29 October 2025

Managerial record by team and tenure
| Team | From | To | Record | | | | | | | |
| Team | From | To | G | W | D | L | GF | GA | GD | Win % |
|---|---|---|---|---|---|---|---|---|---|---|
| Górnik Wieliczka | June 2009 | June 2010 | 36 | 13 | 6 | 17 | 65 | 67 | −2 | 36.11 |
| Wisła Kraków II | 17 June 2013 | 8 June 2016 | 104 | 52 | 19 | 33 | 205 | 142 | +63 | 50.00 |
| Garbarnia Kraków | 24 June 2021 | 30 June 2023 | 72 | 24 | 15 | 33 | 112 | 113 | −1 | 33.33 |
| Wieczysta Kraków | 1 July 2023 | 18 September 2023 | 8 | 5 | 0 | 3 | 25 | 14 | +11 | 62.50 |
| Hutnik Kraków | 27 March 2024 | 19 May 2025 | 42 | 17 | 10 | 15 | 60 | 70 | −10 | 40.48 |
| Stal Stalowa Wola | 15 October 2025 | 27 April 2026 | 17 | 3 | 10 | 4 | 23 | 20 | +3 | 17.65 |
| Total | | | 279 | 114 | 60 | 105 | 490 | 426 | +64 | 40.86 |

== Personal life ==
Musiał is the son of Adam Musiał, former Poland international and manager.
