= Julio Cabrera (footballer) =

Spanish footballer (born 2003)

Personal information
- Full name: Julio Cabrera Ortega
- Date of birth: 14 August 2003 (age 23)
- Place of birth: Olvera, Spain
- Height: 1.75 m (5 ft 9 in)
- Position: Left-back

Team information
- Current team: Atlético Sanluqueño
- Number: 3

Youth career
- 2014–2015: Fundación Cádiz
- 2015–2016: Sporting Chiclana
- 2016–2019: Wea Sierra
- 2019–2020: Fundación Cádiz
- 2020–2021: Balón de Cádiz
- 2021–2022: Cádiz

Senior career*
Years	Team	Apps	(Gls)
2022–2025	Cádiz B	39	(0)
2022–2023	→ Sanluqueño (loan)	22	(0)
2023–2025	Cádiz	0	(0)
2025–	Atlético Sanluqueño	37	(0)
- * Club domestic league appearances and goals as of 10 June 2026

Julio Cabrera Ortega (born 14 August 2003) is a Spanish footballer who plays as a left-back for Primera Federación club Atlético Sanluqueño.

== Career ==
Born in Olvera, Cádiz, Andalusia, Cabrera represented Fundación Cádiz, Sporting Chiclana CD, CD Wea Sierra de Cádiz and Balón de Cádiz CF before finishing his formation with Cádiz CF. On 12 July 2022, he was loaned out to Segunda Federación side Atlético Sanluqueño CF for the season.

Cabrera made his senior debut on 3 September 2022, playing the last 19 minutes in a 1–1 away draw against Club Recreativo Granada. He returned to the Submarino Amarillo in July 2023, and renewed his contract until 2026 shortly after.

Initially assigned to the reserves, Cabrera made his first team debut on 1 November 2023, starting in a 0–0 away draw against CF Badalona Futur (4–2 penalty win), for the campaign's Copa del Rey. He made his professional debut on 4 December, starting and being sent off in a 1–0 home loss to CD Eldense, also for the national cup.

On 17 January 2025, Cabrera returned to Sanluqueño, now in a permanent deal.
