= Raúl López (footballer, born 1976) =

Spanish footballer

Personal information
- Full name: Raúl López Gutiérrez
- Date of birth: 17 September 1976 (age 50)
- Place of birth: Jerez de la Frontera, Spain
- Height: 1.81 m (5 ft 11 1/2 in)
- Position: Left-back

Youth career
- 1993–1995: Cádiz

Senior career*
Years	Team	Apps	(Gls)
1995–2001	Cádiz	164	(2)
1995–1996	→ Melilla (loan)	21	(1)
2001–2003	Racing Ferrol	53	(0)
2003–2011	Cádiz	217	(3)
2011–2012	San Fernando	21	(1)
2012–2013	Portuense	24	(1)
2013–2014	Chipiona		
2014	Arcos	3	(0)
2014–2015	Lebrijana	1	(0)
Total		504	(8)
- * Club domestic league appearances and goals

Raúl López Gutiérrez (born 17 September 1976) is a Spanish former professional footballer who played as a left-back.

== Club career ==
López was born in Jerez de la Frontera, Province of Cádiz. Over the course of 14 seasons (13 complete, two separate spells) he represented Cádiz CF, being the player with most competitive games for the Andalusia side at exactly 400, 385 in league and 15 in the Copa del Rey. He appeared with them in all of the three major levels of Spanish football.

In 2005–06, López played in La Liga with his main club, featuring in 27 matches and scoring in a 1–1 home draw against Racing de Santander as the campaign ended in relegation. In July 2011, aged 34, he left the Estadio Ramón de Carranza and resumed his career in the lower leagues and amateur football.
