= Andrzej Turecki =

Polish footballer

Personal information
- Date of birth: 2 November 1954 (age 71)
- Place of birth: Kraków, Poland
- Height: 1.87 m (6 ft 2 in)
- Position: Centre-back

Team information
- Current team: Wieczysta Kraków (chairman)

Youth career
- Cracovia

Senior career*
Years	Team	Apps	(Gls)
1972–1984	Cracovia	44+	(0+)
1984	Polish-American Eagles SC		
1984–1986	Royal Wawel SC		
- * Club domestic league appearances and goals

Andrzej Turecki (born 2 November 1954) is a Polish former professional footballer who played as a centre-back. He is the current chairman of Wieczysta Kraków.

He is known for his long-standing association with Cracovia, where he spent his entire professional career, and is widely considered a club legend.

== Club career ==
Turecki joined Cracovia in 1972 and made his debut for the club on 28 June 1973, in a match against Górnik Siersza. He quickly established himself as a key player for the team, known for his strong defensive skills and leadership on the field. Turecki played for Cracovia across four different league levels, a feat shared only with Tomasz Niemiec. He also took part in "Holy Wars" in 1974 and 1982.

Throughout his career, Turecki made a total of 44 appearances in the top division for Cracovia, although he did not score any goals. His contributions were crucial in helping the then-ailing Cracovia achieve promotions and maintain their position in the league.

== Post-playing career ==
After retiring from professional football, Turecki remained involved with Cracovia, serving in various roles including as a team manager. He has also been a member of the club's Council of Seniors since 2016. He then became chairman of Wieczysta Kraków

== Personal life ==
Turecki resided in the United States since 1997 but has expressed his desire to return to Poland and continue his involvement with Cracovia.
