= Dariusz Marzec =

Polish footballer

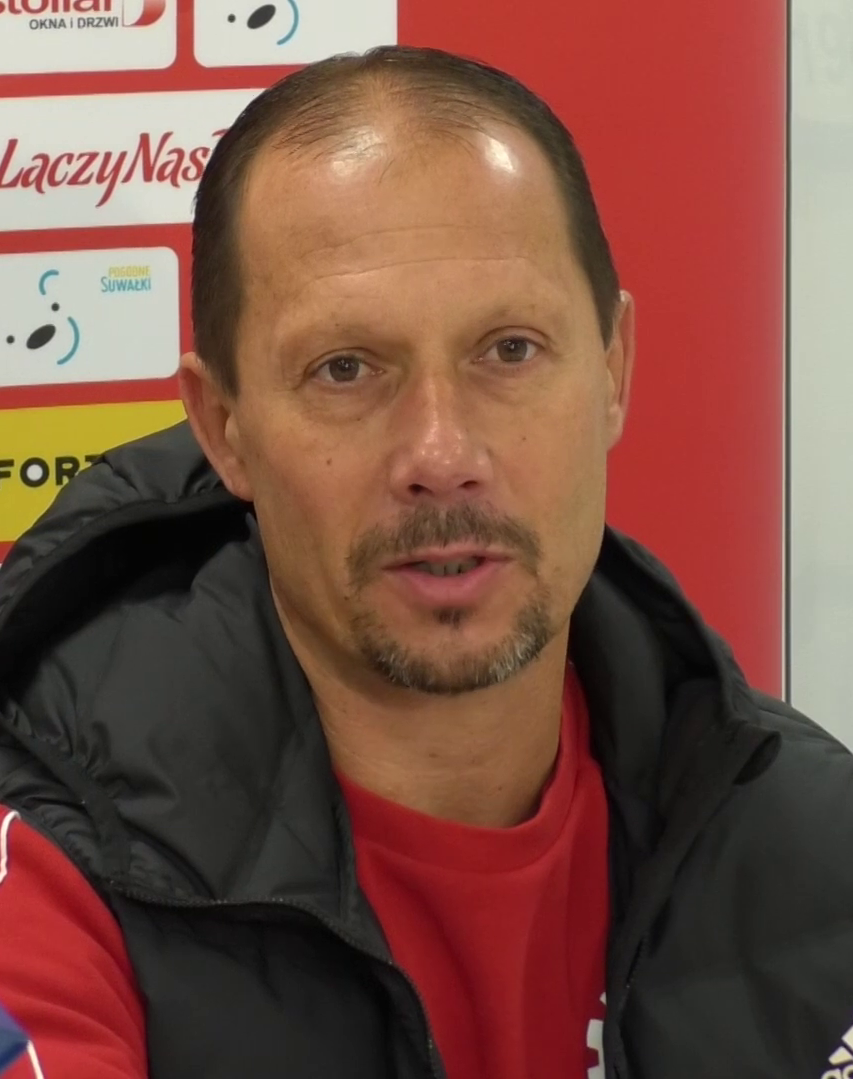

Personal information
- Date of birth: 14 September 1969 (age 57)
- Place of birth: Kraków, Poland
- Height: 1.74 m (5 ft 9 in)
- Position: Midfielder

Youth career
- 1976–1979: Bronowianka Kraków
- 1979–1989: Wisła Kraków

Senior career*
| Years | Team | Apps | (Gls) |
| 1989–1997 | Wisła Kraków | 193 | (33) |
| 1995 | → GKS Katowice (loan) | 10 | (0) |
| 1997–1998 | AEL | | |
| 1999 | Kallithea | | |
| 1999 | TPV | 10 | (0) |
| 1999 | Hutnik Kraków | 3 | (1) |
| 2000 | Górnik Zabrze | 7 | (1) |
| 2000 | Stomil Olsztyn | 6 | (0) |
| 2001 | GKS Bełchatów | | |
| 2001 | FC Jazz | 14 | (1) |
| 2002 | LKS Niedźwiedź | | |
| 2004 | Proszowianka Proszowice | | |
| 2005–2006 | Dalin Myślenice | | |

Managerial career
- 2005–2014: Wisła Kraków (youth)
- 2018–2019: KKS 1925 Kalisz
- 2019–2020: Stal Mielec
- 2020–2021: Arka Gdynia
- 2022–2023: Wieczysta Kraków
- 2023–2024: Podbeskidzie
- * Club domestic league appearances and goals

Dariusz Marzec (born 14 September 1969) is a Polish professional football manager and former player. He was most recently in charge of Podbeskidzie Bielsko-Biała.

== Managerial statistics ==
As of match played 28 February 2024

Managerial record by team and tenure
| Team | From | To | Record | | | | | | | |
| Team | From | To | G | W | D | L | GF | GA | GD | Win % |
|---|---|---|---|---|---|---|---|---|---|---|
| KKS 1925 Kalisz | 23 August 2018 | 6 May 2019 | 24 | 19 | 2 | 3 | 68 | 23 | +45 | 79.17 |
| Stal Mielec | 22 September 2019 | 31 July 2020 | 28 | 18 | 3 | 7 | 53 | 25 | +28 | 64.29 |
| Arka Gdynia | 17 December 2020 | 19 October 2021 | 36 | 18 | 7 | 11 | 59 | 37 | +22 | 50.00 |
| Wieczysta Kraków | 6 September 2022 | 20 March 2023 | 14 | 9 | 2 | 3 | 31 | 15 | +16 | 64.29 |
| Podbeskidzie | 16 November 2023 | 28 February 2024 | 6 | 1 | 1 | 4 | 6 | 11 | −5 | 16.67 |
| Total | | | 108 | 65 | 15 | 28 | 217 | 111 | +106 | 60.19 |

== Honours ==
=== Player ===
GKS Katowice

- Polish Super Cup: 1995

=== Manager ===
KKS 1925 Kalisz

- Polish Cup (Kalisz regionals): 2018–19

Stal Mielec

- I liga: 2019–20
