= Enrique Ortiz (Spanish footballer) =

Spanish footballer

Enrique
Personal information
- Full name: Enrique Fernando Ortiz Moruno
- Date of birth: 2 July 1977 (age 49)
- Place of birth: Azuaga, Spain
- Height: 1.75 m (5 ft 9 in)
- Position: Winger

Senior career*
Years	Team	Apps	(Gls)
1995–1996	Azuaga	15	(9)
1996–1998	Cacereño B	29	(18)
1997	Cacereño	1	(0)
1998–1999	Algeciras	23	(6)
1999–2000	Maracena		
2000–2001	Motril	34	(4)
2001–2004	Cacereño	87	(50)
2004–2012	Cádiz	239	(39)
Total		428+	(126+)
- * Club domestic league appearances and goals

Enrique Fernando Ortiz Moruno (born 2 July 1977), known simply as Enrique, is a Spanish former professional footballer who played as a right winger.

He appeared mainly for Cádiz in a 17-year career, representing the club in all three major levels of Spanish football.

== Club career ==
Born in Azuaga, Province of Badajoz, Enrique spent his first seven years as a senior in the Segunda División B (one season also in the Tercera División with CP Cacereño, where he scored 38 goals to help his team to promote), signing with Cádiz CF in January 2004. After a slow first season, he became a very important attacking unit for the Andalusians, netting twice in 28 games in his second year to achieve a La Liga promotion.

Enrique made his Spanish top-flight debut on 28 August 2005 in a 1–2 home loss to Real Madrid at the age of 28, and scored his first goal on 23 October as the game's only against Athletic Bilbao at the Estadio Ramón Carranza. He only missed two matches during the campaign but Cádiz were immediately relegated, and he continued to represent the club until his retirement in June 2012 at nearly 35, in the second and third tiers.
