= Manolo Cardo =

Spanish football manager (1940–2025)

Personal information
- Full name: Manuel Cardo Romero
- Date of birth: 16 April 1940
- Place of birth: Coria del Río, Spain
- Date of death: 15 September 2025 (aged 85)
- Position: Midfielder

Senior career*
Years	Team	Apps	(Gls)
1960–1961	San Fernando	1	(0)
1962–1967	Sevilla	38	(3)
1964–1965	→ Algeciras (loan)	24	(0)
1968–1970	Recreativo		
1970–1971	Avilés		

Managerial career
- 1980–1981: Sevilla B
- 1981–1986: Sevilla
- 1986–1987: Cádiz
- 1987–1988: Recreativo
- 1990: Xerez
- 1990–1991: Las Palmas
- 1994–1995: Xerez
- 1995–1996: Atlético Marbella
- * Club domestic league appearances and goals

Manuel Cardo Romero (16 April 1940 – 15 September 2025), known as Manolo Cardo, was a Spanish professional football player and manager.

Born in Coria del Río, Cardo managed club sides including Sevilla Atlético, Sevilla, Cádiz, Recreativo de Huelva, Xerez, Las Palmas and Atlético Marbella.

He died on 15 September 2025, at the age of 85.
