= Ismael Álvarez (footballer) =

Spanish footballer (born 2007)

Personal information
- Full name: Ismael Álvarez Martín
- Date of birth: 18 October 2007 (age 19)
- Place of birth: Lebrija, Spain
- Position: Winger

Team information
- Current team: Rayo Majadahonda (on loan from Cádiz)

Youth career
- 2013–2017: Lebrija
- 2017–2018: Pueblo Nuevo
- 2018–2019: Lebrija
- 2019–2021: Cádiz
- 2021–2022: Fundación Cádiz
- 2022: Cádiz
- 2022–2023: Balón de Cádiz
- 2023–2025: Cádiz

Senior career*
Years	Team	Apps	(Gls)
2024	Cádiz C	2	(0)
2025–	Cádiz B	22	(10)
2025–	Cádiz	1	(0)
2026	→ Atlético Sanluqueño (loan)	12	(2)
2026–	→ Rayo Majadahonda (loan)	0	(0)
- * Club domestic league appearances and goals as of 10 June 2026

Ismael Álvarez Martín (born 18 October 2007) is a Spanish footballer who plays as a winger for CF Rayo Majadahonda, on loan from Cádiz CF.

== Career ==
Álvarez was born in Lebrija, Seville, Andalusia, and joined Cádiz CF's youth sides at the age of 12, after playing for CD Lebrija and AD Pueblo Nuevo. On 19 October 2023, while still a youth, he extended his contract with the club until 2026.

Álvarez made his senior debut with the C-team during the 2024–25 season in División de Honor, before starting to appear with the reserves in Segunda Federación. On 7 April 2025, he renewed his link with the Amarillos until 2028.

Álvarez made his first team debut with Cádiz on 25 May 2025, coming on as a late substitute for fellow youth graduate Moussa Diakité in a 4–0 Segunda División home routing of SD Huesca.

On 16 January 2026, Álvarez was loaned by Atlético Sanluqueño CF in Primera Federación. On 14 August, he moved to fellow league team CF Rayo Majadahonda also in a temporary deal.
