= Leszek Walankiewicz =

Polish footballer

Personal information
- Date of birth: 18 August 1959 (age 67)
- Place of birth: Przemyśl, Poland
- Height: 1.79 m (5 ft 10 in)
- Position: Defender

Youth career
- Czuwaj Przemyśl

Senior career*
Years	Team	Apps	(Gls)
1978	Czuwaj Przemyśl		
1979–1996	Hutnik Kraków		
1997–2000	Cracovia		

Managerial career
- 2000–2001: Wieczysta Kraków
- 2002: Hutnik Kraków
- * Club domestic league appearances and goals

Leszek Walankiewicz (born 18 August 1959) is a Polish former professional football who played as a defender.
