= Jordi Gonzalvo =

Spanish footballer and coach

Personal information
- Full name: Jordi Gonzalvo Solà
- Date of birth: 13 June 1947 (age 79)
- Place of birth: Barcelona, Spain
- Position: Midfielder

Youth career
- 1960–1963: Barcelona
- 1963–1964: CD Universitario
- 1964–1966: Barcelona

Senior career*
| Years | Team | Apps | (Gls) |
| 1966–1967 | Sant Andreu | | |
| 1967–1969 | Blanes | | |
| 1969–1970 | Atlético Baleares | | |
| 1970–1971 | Sitges | | |
| 1971–1973 | Blanes | | |
| 1973–1977 | Cerdanyola Vallès | | |

Managerial career
- 1977–1978: Sant Andreu B
- 1978–1979: La Salle Bonanova
- 1979–1980: Figueres
- 1980–1981: Gramenet
- 1981–1982: Canovelles
- 1982–1985: Figueres
- 1985–1988: Lleida
- 1988–1989: Figueres
- 1989–1990: Mollerussa
- 1990–1993: Sant Andreu
- 1994: Levante
- 1995: Terrassa
- 1995–1997: Gimnàstic
- 1997–1998: Castellón
- 1998–1999: Cádiz
- 2000: Terrassa
- * Club domestic league appearances and goals

Jordi Gonzalvo Solà (born 13 June 1947) is a Spanish retired footballer who played as a midfielder, and is a current coach and pundit for the Catalan public television TV3 (Catalonia).

== Playing career ==
Gonzalvo was born in Barcelona, Catalonia. A FC Barcelona youth graduate, he made his senior debuts with UE Sant Andreu in 1966, in Tercera División. He only appeared for lower league sides in his native region during his whole career, notably representing CD Atlético Baleares and CD Blanes, and retired in 1977 at the age of 30.

== Managerial career ==
Immediately after retiring Gonzalvo took up coaching, being appointed at former team Sant Andreu's reserve side. In 1979, after a short spell at CE La Salle Bonanova, he was appointed manager of UE Figueres in the fourth tier; after failing to win promotion, he was dismissed.

Gonzalvo subsequently spent one full season at UDA Gramenet and another at UE Canovelles, and returned to Figueres in the 1982 summer. He achieved promotion at first attempt, but was sacked midway through the 1984–85 campaign.

In 1985 Gonzalvo was appointed at the helm of UE Lleida, in Segunda División B. He was promoted to Segunda División in 1987 and took the club to an impressive sixth place in the following campaign, but returned to Figueres in 1988.

In the 1990 summer, after a year at CFJ Mollerussa, Gonzalvo was named UE Sant Andreu manager. He appeared in the promotion play-offs for two consecutive years, but failed to promote.

Gonzalvo continued to manage solely in the third division in the following years, with Levante UD, Terrassa FC (two stints), Gimnàstic de Tarragona, CD Castellón and Cádiz CF.
