= Przemysław Cecherz =

Polish football manager

Personal information
- Date of birth: 12 April 1973 (age 53)
- Place of birth: Łódź, Poland
- Height: 1.81 m (5 ft 11 in)
- Position: Goalkeeper

Team information
- Current team: Świt Szczecin (manager)

Senior career*
Years	Team	Apps	(Gls)
- KKS Koluszki
- Bałtyk Gdynia
- Wisła Chicago
- Cracovia Chicago

Managerial career
- Start Brzeziny
- 2003–2005: KKS Koluszki
- 2006: Górnik Zabrze (caretaker)
- 2007: Wisła Płock (caretaker)
- 2007–2008: Hetman Zamość
- 2008–2009: Tur Turek
- 2009: Stal Stalowa Wola
- 2009: Znicz Pruszków
- 2010–2011: Świt Nowy Dwór Mazowiecki
- 2011–2014: Kolejarz Stróże
- 2014: GKS Tychy
- 2015: Poroniec Poronin
- 2015–2016: Raków Częstochowa
- 2016: Świt Nowy Dwór Mazowiecki
- 2016–2017: Widzew Łódź
- 2017–2018: KSZO Ostrowiec Świętokrzyski
- 2018: Chojniczanka Chojnice
- 2019–2021: Wieczysta Kraków
- 2021: KSZO Ostrowiec Świętokrzyski
- 2022: Cartusia Kartuzy
- 2023: Warta Sieradz
- 2023–2024: Vineta Wolin
- 2024–2025: Star Starachowice
- 2025: Wieczysta Kraków
- 2026: Stal Stalowa Wola
- 2026–: Świt Szczecin
- * Club domestic league appearances and goals

Przemysław Cecherz (born 12 April 1973) is a Polish professional football manager and former player who is currently in charge of II liga club Świt Szczecin.

== Career ==
After leaving Bałtyk Gdynia due to the financial situation there, Cecherz left for the United States, where he played for amateur clubs in the Polish community. Despite knowing he would not carve out a great playing career, he knew he would return to Poland to become a manager.

== Managerial statistics ==
As of match played 5 October 2025

Managerial record by team and tenure
Team	From	To	Record							
Team	From	To	G	W	D	L	GF	GA	GD	Win %
KKS Koluszki	July 2003	June 2005	64	46	10	8	179	61	+118	71.88
Górnik Zabrze (caretaker)	19 April 2006	26 April 2006	2	1	0	1	2	3	−1	50.00
Wisła Płock (caretaker)	23 April 2007	30 April 2007	2	0	1	1	1	3	−2	0.00
Hetman Zamość	22 June 2007	14 September 2008	45	22	13	10	57	32	+25	48.89
Tur Turek	17 September 2008	30 March 2009	12	4	5	3	15	15	+0	33.33
Stal Stalowa Wola	1 July 2009	21 September 2009	11	2	2	7	9	18	−9	18.18
Znicz Pruszków	16 October 2009	13 December 2009	6	1	0	5	4	16	−12	16.67
Świt Nowy Dwór Mazowiecki	25 June 2010	23 June 2011	37	18	12	7	46	27	+19	48.65
Kolejarz Stróże	23 June 2011	26 June 2014	105	42	25	38	124	123	+1	40.00
GKS Tychy	26 June 2014	28 October 2014	17	3	7	7	19	25	−6	17.65
Poroniec Poronin (Note: Does not include 2015–16 III liga statistics, Poroniec's results were voided after they withdrew from the competition.)	7 April 2015	21 August 2015	16	14	2	0	41	12	+29	87.50
Raków Częstochowa	9 October 2015	16 April 2016	15	8	2	5	31	25	+6	53.33
Świt Nowy Dwór Mazowiecki	20 April 2016	30 November 2016	32	16	11	5	58	23	+35	50.00
Widzew Łódź	2 December 2016	8 August 2017	20	12	4	4	37	16	+21	60.00
KSZO Ostrowiec Świętokrzyski	19 December 2017	30 June 2018	21	12	6	3	38	15	+23	57.14
Chojniczanka Chojnice	1 July 2018	10 October 2018	14	5	6	3	21	18	+3	35.71
Wieczysta Kraków	20 July 2019	2 June 2021	54	51	3	0	343	26	+317	94.44
KSZO Ostrowiec Świętokrzyski	1 July 2021	31 August 2021	5	0	2	3	2	5	−3	0.00
Cartusia Kartuzy	30 August 2022	9 November 2022	11	3	1	7	11	18	−7	27.27
Warta Sieradz	21 March 2023	30 June 2023	15	6	3	6	23	15	+8	40.00
Vineta Wolin	1 July 2023	22 April 2024	26	13	4	9	33	38	−5	50.00
Star Starachowice	22 April 2024	1 May 2025	42	24	8	10	83	48	+35	57.14
Wieczysta Kraków	1 May 2025	5 October 2025	21	9	7	5	37	23	+14	42.86
Stal Stalowa Wola	1 July 2026	14 July 2026	0	0	0	0	0	0	—	
Świt Szczecin	14 August 2026	Present	0	0	0	0	0	0	+0	—
Total			593	312	134	147	1,214	605	+609	52.61

== Honours ==
KKS Koluszki

- Regional league Łódź: 2004–05

Poroniec Poronin

- Polish Cup (Nowy Sącz-Podhale regionals): 2014–15

Świt Nowy Dwór Mazowiecki

- Polish Cup (Masovia regionals): 2015–16

Wieczysta Kraków

- Polish Cup (Kraków subdistrict regionals): 2019–20, 2020–21
- Polish Cup (Kraków City regionals): 2019–20

Star Starachowice

- Polish Cup (Świętokrzyskie regionals): 2023–24
