= Piotr Madejski =

Polish footballer (born 1983)

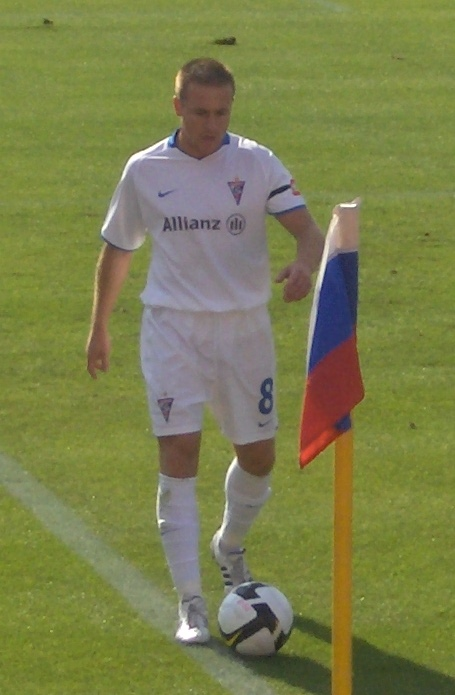
- Madejski with Górnik Zabrze in 2009

Personal information
- Date of birth: 2 August 1983 (age 43)
- Place of birth: Kraków, Poland
- Height: 1.74 m (5 ft 9 in)
- Position: Midfielder

Team information
- Current team: Wanda Kraków
- Number: 5

Senior career*
Years	Team	Apps	(Gls)
2000–2006	Hutnik Kraków		
2006	Arka Gdynia	1	(0)
2007–2009	Górnik Zabrze	82	(4)
2010	ŁKS Łódź	15	(2)
2010–2011	Kolejarz Stróże	33	(2)
2011–2014	Miedź Legnica	97	(10)
2014–2015	Puszcza Niepołomice	30	(1)
2015	Poroniec Poronin	15	(1)
2016	MKS Kluczbork	11	(1)
2016–2017	Sosnowianka Stanisław Dolny	27	(5)
2017–2018	Michałowianka Michałowice	15	(5)
2018–2019	Relaks Wysoka	29	(11)
2019–2022	Wieczysta Kraków	48	(14)
2020–2024	Wieczysta Kraków II	73	(29)
2024–	Wanda Kraków	48	(10)

International career
2007	Poland	1	(0)
- * Club domestic league appearances and goals as of 22:05, 30 June 2026 (UTC)

Piotr Madejski (born 2 August 1983) is a Polish professional footballer who plays as a midfielder for regional league club Wanda Kraków.

== Club career ==
In July 2011, he joined Miedź Legnica.

== Career statistics ==
=== International ===
Appearances and goals by national team and year
National team	Year	Apps	Goals
Poland
Poland	2007	1	0
Total		1	0

== Honours ==
Miedź Legnica

- II liga West: 2011–12

Relaks Wesoła

- Klasa A Wadowice: 2017–18

Wieczysta Kraków

- IV liga Lesser Poland West: 2021–22
- Regional league Kraków II: 2020–21
- Polish Cup (Lesser Poland regionals): 2020–21
- Polish Cup (Kraków District regionals): 2019–20, 2020–21
- Polish Cup (Kraków regionals): 2019–20

Wieczysta Kraków II

- V liga Lesser Poland West: 2023–24
- Regional league Kraków II: 2022–23
- Klasa A Kraków III: 2021–22
- Klasa B Kraków III: 2020–21
- Polish Cup (Kraków District regionals): 2022–23
