= Juan Díaz (footballer, born 2006) =

Spanish footballer (born 2006)

Personal information
- Full name: Juan Díaz Peregrina
- Date of birth: 24 May 2006 (age 20)
- Place of birth: Seville, Spain
- Height: 1.75 m (5 ft 9 in)
- Position: Right-back

Team information
- Current team: Cádiz
- Number: 27

Youth career
- 2014–2021: Betis
- 2021–2023: Balón de Cádiz
- 2022–2024: Cádiz

Senior career*
Years	Team	Apps	(Gls)
2024	Cádiz C	6	(0)
2024–	Cádiz B	38	(0)
2025–	Cádiz	13	(0)
- * Club domestic league appearances and goals as of 22 August 2026

Juan Díaz Peregrina (born 24 May 2006) is a Spanish footballer who plays as a right-back for Cádiz CF.

== Career ==
Born in Seville, Andalusia, Díaz joined Real Betis' youth sides in 2014, aged eight. In 2021, he moved to the youth sides of Cádiz CF, spending two seasons at affiliate side Balón de Cádiz CF before making his senior debut with the C-team in Primera Andaluza in 2024.

On 22 July 2024, Díaz renewed his contract with the Yellow Submarine until 2026, and started to feature with the reserves in Segunda Federación. He made his first team debut on 28 October; after coming on as a half-time substitute for Jorge Moreno, he scored his side's third in a 3–1 away win over UCAM Murcia CF, for the season's Copa del Rey.

Díaz made his professional debut on 2 November 2025, starting in a 0–0 Segunda División away draw against FC Andorra.
