= José Antonio de la Rosa =

Spanish footballer (born 2004)

Personal information
- Full name: José Antonio de la Rosa Garrido
- Date of birth: 28 July 2004 (age 22)
- Place of birth: Huelva, Spain
- Height: 1.74 m (5 ft 9 in)
- Position: Winger

Team information
- Current team: Wieczysta Kraków
- Number: 19

Youth career
- 2014–2016: Nuevo Molino
- 2016–2017: Recreativo
- 2017–2020: Betis
- 2020–2022: Cádiz

Senior career*
Years	Team	Apps	(Gls)
2022–2023	Cádiz B	21	(2)
2023–2026	Cádiz	55	(3)
2023–2024	→ Recreativo (loan)	32	(6)
2026–	Wieczysta Kraków	0	(0)
- * Club domestic league appearances and goals as of 14:12, 5 September 2026 (UTC)

José Antonio de la Rosa Garrido (born 28 July 2004) is a Spanish professional footballer who plays as a winger for Ekstraklasa club Wieczysta Kraków.

== Career ==
de la Rosa is a youth product of CDC Nuevo Molino, Recreativo de Huelva and Real Betis, before finishing his youth development with Cádiz CF in 2022. He was promoted to the reserves in the Segunda Federación for the 2022–23 season, and earned his first call-up to their senior team in April 2023. On 11 April 2023, he signed a professional contract with the club until 2027. He made his professional debut with the senior Cádiz side as a substitute in a 5–1 La Liga loss to Atlético Madrid on 3 May 2023, and assisted his side's only goal in the 71st minute.

On 1 September 2023, de la Rosa returned to his former club, Recreativo de Huelva, on a loan deal for the rest of the season.

On 5 September 2026, Polish club Wieczysta Kraków announced they had reached an agreement with Cadiz for de la Rosa's transfer. The following day, after completing a medical, he signed a two-year contract with an option for another year, for a fee reported to be €700,000.
