= Lisandro Semedo =

Cape Verdean footballer

Personal information
- Full name: Lisandro Pedro Varela Semedo
- Date of birth: 12 March 1996 (age 30)
- Place of birth: Setúbal, Portugal
- Height: 1.75 m (5 ft 9 in)
- Position: Winger

Team information
- Current team: Wieczysta Kraków
- Number: 7

Youth career
- 2005–2015: Sporting CP
- 2015–2016: Reading

Senior career*
Years	Team	Apps	(Gls)
2016–2017	AEZ Zakakiou	15	(1)
2017–2018	Apollon Limassol	0	(0)
2017–2018	→ Fortuna Sittard (loan)	37	(15)
2018–2022	Fortuna Sittard	71	(12)
2019–2020	→ OFI (loan)	28	(7)
2022–2024	Radomiak Radom	63	(7)
2024–	Wieczysta Kraków	78	(21)

International career^{‡}
2011–2012	Portugal U16	6	(0)
2012–2013	Portugal U17	3	(0)
2014	Portugal U18	2	(1)
2019–	Cape Verde	19	(2)
- * Club domestic league appearances and goals as of 00:40, 18 October 2026 (UTC) ‡ National team caps and goals as of 6 May 2024

Lisandro Pedro Varela Semedo (born 12 March 1996) is a professional footballer who plays as a winger for Polish Ekstraklasa club Wieczysta Kraków. Born in Portugal, he plays for the Cape Verde national team.

== Club career ==
On 15 July 2016, Semedo signed for Reading from Sporting, on a three-year contract. A year later, Semedo moved to AEZ Zakakiou.

=== Loan to OFI ===
On 27 June 2019, he joined OFI on a season-long loan from Fortuna Sittard. On 29 September 2019, he scored his first goal for the club in a 3–1 home win against Asteras Tripolis. On 6 October 2019, Semedo made an outstanding performance, in a triumphant 4–1 home win against Panionios, netting a brace and giving one assist. On 26 October 2019, he sealed a 2–0 home win against Xanthi. On 3 November 2019, Semedo scored soon after kick-off, but his team eventually suffered a 3–2 away defeat against AEL, despite taking a two-goal advantage. On 30 November 2019, Semedo scored the only goal after 52 minutes and taking on a pass from Juan Neira, sealing a vital 1–0 home win game against AEK Athens.

On 1 March 2020, he scored, after four months, in a 3–0 home win against Lamia.

=== Radomiak ===
On 9 July 2022, he joined Polish Ekstraklasa side Radomiak Radom on a two-year contract.

=== Wieczysta Kraków ===
On 10 June 2024, Semedo moved down from the top flight to the third tier of the Polish league system as he joined newly promoted Wieczysta Kraków on a two-year deal, with a one-year extension option.

== Personal life ==
Semedo is of Cape Verdean descent. He has a partner and a child.

== Career statistics ==
=== Club ===
As of match played 31 May 2026

Appearances and goals by club, season and competition
Club	Season	League			National cup (Note: Includes KNVB Cup, Greek Cup, Polish Cup)		Europe		Other		Total	
Club	Season	Division	Apps	Goals	Apps	Goals	Apps	Goals	Apps	Goals	Apps	Goals
AEZ Zakakiou	2016–17	Cypriot First Division	15	1	0	0	—		—		15	1
Fortuna Sittard (loan)	2017–18	Eerste Divisie	37	15	3	0	—		—		40	15
Fortuna Sittard	2018–19	Eredivisie	28	3	4	1	—		—		32	4
Fortuna Sittard	2020–21	Eredivisie	34	9	2	0	—		—		36	9
Fortuna Sittard	2021–22	Eredivisie	9	0	1	0	—		—		10	0
Fortuna Sittard	Total		108	27	10	1	—		—		118	28
OFI (loan)	2019–20	Super League Greece	28	7	2	0	—		—		30	7
Radomiak Radom	2022–23	Ekstraklasa	32	3	3	0	—		—		35	3
Radomiak Radom	2023–24	Ekstraklasa	31	4	0	0	—		—		31	4
Radomiak Radom	Total		63	7	3	0	—		—		66	7
Wieczysta Kraków	2024–25	II liga	30	6	—		—		2 (Note: Appearances in II liga promotion play-offs)	0	32	6
Wieczysta Kraków	2025–26	I liga	33	9	1	0	—		2 (Note: Appearances in I liga promotion play-offs)	2	36	11
Wieczysta Kraków	Total		63	15	1	0	—		4	2	68	17
Career total			277	57	16	1	0	0	4	2	297	60

=== International ===
As of match played 25 March 2024

Appearances and goals by national team and year
National team	Year	Apps	Goals
Cape Verde
Cape Verde	2019	1	0
Cape Verde	2020	4	1
Cape Verde	2021	3	0
Cape Verde	2022	7	1
Cape Verde	2023	2	0
Cape Verde	2024	2	0
Total		19	2
