= Manu Rivera =

Spanish footballer (born 2009)

Personal information
- Full name: Manuel Rivera Domínguez
- Date of birth: 30 March 2009 (age 17)
- Place of birth: A Coruña, Spain
- Position: Left-back

Team information
- Current team: Cádiz B
- Number: 35

Youth career
- 2015–2019: Marianistas
- 2019–2020: Fundación Cádiz
- 2020–2026: Cádiz

Senior career*
Years	Team	Apps	(Gls)
2026–	Cádiz B	15	(1)
2026–	Cádiz	1	(0)
- * Club domestic league appearances and goals as of 15 August 2026

Manuel "Manu" Rivera Domínguez (born 30 March 2009) is a Spanish footballer who plays as a left-back for Cádiz CF Mirandilla.

== Career ==
Born in A Coruña, Galicia, Rivera grew up in Jerez de la Frontera and played for AD Marianistas Jerez in the city. He joined Cádiz CF in 2019, spending a year in the club's foundation before progressing through the youth categories and renewing his link until 2028 on 20 May 2025.

Rivera made his senior debut with the reserves on 24 January 2026, starting in a 2–1 Tercera Federación home win over CD Utrera. He scored his first senior goal on 8 March, netting the winner in a 1–0 home success over Coria CF.

On 15 August 2026, after spending the entire pre-season with the first team, Rivera made his professional debut by starting in a 0–0 Segunda División home draw against RC Celta Fortuna.
