= Agustín Juárez (footballer) =

Argentine footballer (born 2005)

Personal information
- Date of birth: 24 May 2005 (age 21)
- Place of birth: Junín, Argentina
- Position: Forward

Team information
- Current team: Huesca

Youth career
- Defensa Argentina
- 2021–2022: Matienzo de Rufino
- 2023–2024: Newell's Old Boys

Senior career*
| Years | Team | Apps | (Gls) |
| 2024–2026 | Newell's Old Boys | 4 | (1) |
| 2025 | → Granada B (loan) | 9 | (1) |
| 2025–2026 | → Atlético Sanluqueño (loan) | 31 | (2) |
| 2026– | Huesca | 0 | (0) |
- * Club domestic league appearances and goals as of 10 June 2026

Agustín Juárez (born 24 May 2005) is an Argentine professional footballer who plays as a forward for Spanish club SD Huesca.

== Early life ==
Born in Junín, Buenos Aires, Juárez began his career with hometown side Club Defensa Argentina, but had to leave football at the age of 12 to help his family to earn money. He worked selling socks, cutting grass in the neighborhoods and sweeping the sidewalks of elder people in exchange of food, and also went on to beg for groceries in local businesses.

After losing his mother in 2020 due to an illness, Juárez spent five months taking care of his three younger brothers on his own, before moving to Rufino to live with his father. At the city, he worked as a bricklayer while playing for CPEF Matienzo de Rufino.

== Career ==
Juárez went on trials at Newell's Old Boys, before eventually joining the club in 2023. After playing with the reserve side, he made his first team – and Primera División – debut on 5 October 2024, coming on as a second-half substitute for Juan Manuel García in a 2–1 home win over Lanús.

On 26 October 2024, Juárez signed his first professional contract with Newell's, until December 2026. He scored his first goal as a senior on 15 December, scoring his side's second in a 3–1 away win over Talleres de Córdoba.

On 25 January 2025, Juárez moved abroad and joined Granada CF on a one-year loan deal, and was initially assigned to the B-team in Segunda Federación. On 27 August, he joined Primera Federación side Atlético Sanluqueño CF also in a temporary deal.

On 19 July 2026, Juárez signed a two-year contract with SD Huesca, also in the Spanish third division.
