= Agustín Suárez =

Argentine professional footballer

Personal information
- Date of birth: 1 May 1997 (age 29)
- Place of birth: Ciudadela, Argentina
- Height: 1.79 m (5 ft 10 in)
- Position: Defender

Team information
- Current team: General Lamadrid
- Number: 4

Senior career*
Years	Team	Apps	(Gls)
2015	Kimberley	1	(0)
2016–2020	All Boys	22	(0)
2020–2021	Deportivo Camioneros	1	(0)
2021–	General Lamadrid	22	(1)
- * Club domestic league appearances and goals as of 14:52, 6 June 2022 (UTC)

Agustín Suárez (born 1 May 1997) is an Argentine professional footballer who plays as a defender for General Lamadrid.

== Career ==
Suárez appeared for Kimberley in the 2015 Torneo Federal B campaign, making one appearance as they qualified for the second phase of the tournament. Midway through 2017–18, Suárez began featuring for Primera B Nacional's All Boys. He made three starts in February 2018, including for his bow on 2 February in an away draw to Independiente Rivadavia at the Estadio Bautista Gargantini.

== Career statistics ==
As of 24 April 2019.

Appearances and goals by club, season and competition
Club	Season	League			Cup		League Cup		Continental		Other		Total	
Club	Season	Division	Apps	Goals	Apps	Goals	Apps	Goals	Apps	Goals	Apps	Goals	Apps	Goals
Kimberley	2015	Torneo Federal B	1	0	0	0	—		—		0	0	1	0
All Boys	2017–18	Primera B Nacional	3	0	0	0	—		—		0	0	3	0
All Boys	2018–19	Primera B Metropolitana	1	0	0	0	—		—		0	0	1	0
Career total			5	0	0	0	—		—		0	0	5	0
