= Wieczysta Kraków =

Polish football club

- Full name: Klub Sportowy Wieczysta Kraków
- Founded: 1942; 84 years ago
- Ground: Kazimierza Chałupnika 16 Street; Synerise Arena Kraków
- Capacity: 1,500; 33,326
- Chairman: Andrzej Turecki
- Head coach: Jacek Zieliński
- League: Ekstraklasa
- 2025–26: I liga, 3rd of 18 (promoted via play-offs)
- Website: www.kswieczysta.com
Home colours

Wieczysta Kraków is a Polish football club, based in Kraków. As of the 2026–27 season, they compete in the Ekstraklasa, after winning the 2025–26 I liga promotion play-offs.

== History ==
=== Wieczysta in the 20th century ===
During the Nazi occupation of Poland, Poles were not permitted to participate in organised sports events. To circumvent these restrictions, some football competitions were secretly held on the meadows of Rakowice, then a village on the borders of Kraków. Eventually, the local community, on the initiative of Edward Ignaszewski, decided to establish a sports club, thus forming Wieczysta Kraków in 1942.

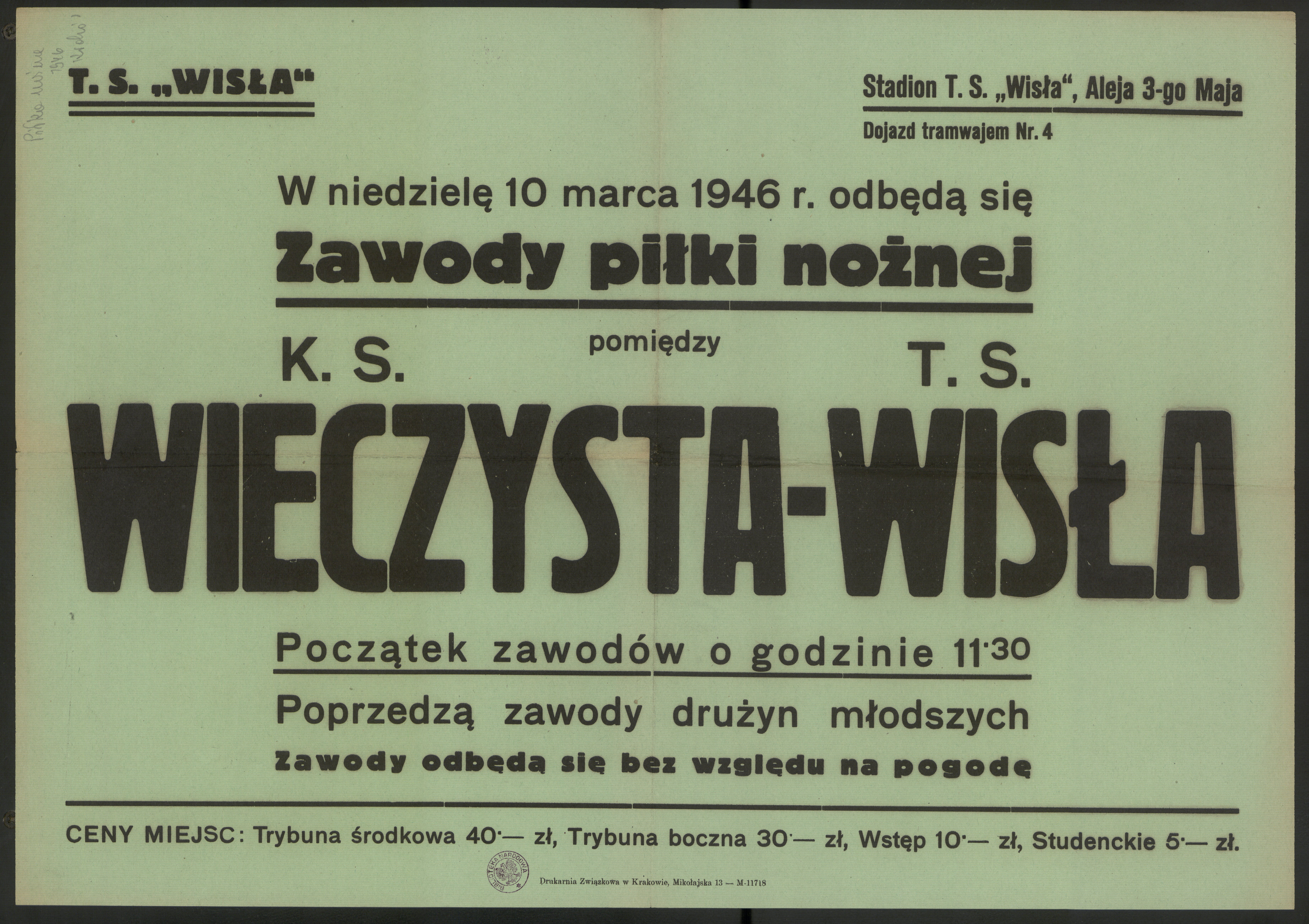
Poster advertising a friendly game with Wisła Kraków, 1946

During the 1950s–60s, Wieczysta played in the class A and B leagues (then the fourth and fifth tiers of the Polish football league system). In 1966 the Polish league system was reorganised, and the III Liga, the new regional third tier, was introduced. Wieczysta was included in the district league (the fourth tier) of the Polish league system. Performances at this level did not last long. In 1968 the team was relegated to class A (the fifth tier), and a year later it was relegated to the sixth tier. The latter years of the 20th century brought stabilization in the form of regular performances at the regional level.

=== Wieczysta at the onset of the 21st century ===
The club played the 1997–98 season in the IV liga, after winning promotion to the fourth tier. After six years at this level the club was relegated, finishing the 2002–03 season in the 18th position at the bottom of the table.

For the following twelve seasons, Wieczysta played in the Liga okręgowa, the fifth and subsequently the sixth tier of the Polish football league after another reorganization in 2008. In the 2014–15 season, the club finished 13th (second from bottom) in the Liga okręgowa, thus getting relegated to the seventh tier. In the first season in Klasa A, the club finished second, therefore missing out on immediate promotion back into the sixth tier. The next season, 2016–17, they finished first in the league, winning promotion back to the Liga okręgowa.

=== Wieczysta's rise under new ownership ===
Wieczysta attracted attention in June 2020 when the businessman Wojciech Kwiecień invested in the club. Under the new owner, Wieczysta invested substantial funds and attracted well-known coaches and players from higher leagues.

In 2021, Wieczysta won promotion to IV liga, finishing first in the Liga okręgowa's Kraków II group. They were the richest amateur club in the country at the time, and won the league with 28 wins out of 28 games, scoring 216 and conceding only 8. On 29 September 2021, they achieved their first victory at the central level of the Polish Cup, winning 2–1 against the I liga club Chrobry Głogów and advancing to the cup's round of 32.

In the 2021–22 season, Wieczysta finished in first place, with 93 points and losing only one game all season, finishing eleven points ahead of second-placed Wiślanie Jaśkowice. The team then had to face the champions of the other Lesser Poland group: the Bruk-Bet Termalica Nieciecza reserves. The first leg took place on 25 June 2022 in Kraków which Wieczysta won 4–0 with all goals coming from Maciej Jankowski. Wieczysta won the second leg 3–0, winning the tie 7–0 on aggregate, and were promoted to the III liga, thereby securing a second consecutive promotion.

Wieczysta started the 2022–23 season in the III liga with two wins, a draw and two defeats. On 29 August 2022, after a home tie against Stal Stalowa Wola, coach Franciszek Smuda left the club. On 6 September 2022, Dariusz Marzec became Wieczysta's coach, followed by Wojciech Łobodzinski on 22 March 2023. His team recorded a disappointing end to the season. The key moment turned out to be a series of five out of six matches without a win, which contributed to the loss of the chance for promotion after the penultimate round, when promotion to the II liga was secured by Stal Stalowa Wola, and Wieczysta was further surpassed by Avia Świdnik, falling to third place in the table before the last round of the III liga. In the last match of a disappointing season, to make up for it, Wieczysta won the final of the Małopolska Polish Cup against Spójnia Osiek-Zimnodół 5–0, which guaranteed their participation in the 2023–24 Polish Cup at the central level. In June 2023, Wieczysta replaced Łobodziński with Maciej Musiał, who signed a one-year contract.

Wieczysta strengthened their squad for the 2023–24 campaign with the arrival of former Poland internationals Michał Pazdan, Rafał Pietrzak and Jacek Góralski, as well as veteran players Saša Živec and Christoph Knasmüllner. After suffering a 1–0 loss in the first round of the 2023–24 season, Wieczysta went on to win five out of the next seven games played. On 18 August, despite being only one point behind group IV leaders Siarka Tarnobrzeg, Musiał was sacked and replaced with former Wieczysta player Sławomir Peszko.

On 18 May 2024, following a 1–0 win over Świdniczanka Świdnik, and with second-placed Siarka Tarnobrzeg losing their game hours later, Wieczysta secured promotion to the II liga (third tier of the Polish football system), three rounds before the end of the season.

In the 2024–25 II liga, despite a significant budget advantage and finishing the first half of the season four points behind leaders, Wieczysta were unable to claim an automatic promotion spot. On 15 June 2025, they won their promotion to I liga (Poland's second tier) after beating Chojniczanka Chojnice 2–0 in the promotion play-off final.

At the end of the 2025–26 season, Wieczysta secured a spot in the I liga promotion play-offs having finished in third place. They beat Polonia Warsaw 3–2 in the play-off semi-finals to reach the final against Chrobry Głogów. On 31 May 2026, Wieczysta beat Chrobry 2–1 to secure promotion to the Ekstraklasa for the first time, their third consecutive promotion.

== Honours ==
- III liga, group IV
  - Champions: 2023–24
- IV liga Lesser Poland West
  - Champions: 2021–22
- Regional league
  - Kraków Division Group II
    - Champions: 2020–21
    - Runners-up: 2018–19, 2019–20
- Klasa A
  - Kraków Division Group II
    - Champions: 2016–17
    - Runners-up: 2015–16
- Polish Cup:
  - National
    - Round of 32: 2021–22
  - Lesser Poland (regional)
    - Winners: 2020–21, 2021–22, 2022–23
    - Runners-up: 2019–20
  - Kraków District
    - Winners: 2019–20, 2020–21
    - Runners-up: 1952, 2016–17

== Players ==
=== Current squad ===
As of 8 September 2026

Note: Flags indicate national team as defined under FIFA eligibility rules; some limited exceptions apply. Players may hold more than one non-FIFA nationality.

No.	Pos.	Nation	Player
1	GK	POL	Antoni Mikułko
4	DF	POL	Karol Fila
7	FW	CPV	Lisandro Semedo
8	MF	POL	Ben Lederman
9	FW	GRE	Efthymis Koulouris
10	MF	NOR	Tobias Christensen
11	MF	SRB	Nikola Knežević
12	MF	BRA	Lucas Piazon
13	DF	POL	Kacper Zagrodzki
15	DF	SRB	Aleksandar Đermanović
16	DF	CRO	Antonio Milić
17	DF	POL	Kamil Dankowski
18	FW	AUT	Stefan Feiertag
19	FW	ESP	José Antonio de la Rosa
20	MF	DEN	Mikkel Maigaard (captain)

No.	Pos.	Nation	Player
21	FW	POL	Bartosz Białek
23	MF	ESP	Miki Villar
24	DF	POL	Mateusz Wieteska
26	GK	CRO	Nikola Čavlina (on loan from Dinamo Zagreb)
27	DF	SVK	Matúš Vojtko
30	MF	BEL	Jacky Donkor
33	DF	POL	Kamil Pestka
44	DF	POL	Dawid Szymonowicz
55	DF	CRO	Duje Dujmović
65	GK	USA	Patryk Stechnij
70	MF	SUI	Petar Pušić
77	GK	POL	Mateusz Kochalski
88	FW	SUI	Christopher Lungoyi
97	MF	POL	Tobiasz Mras

=== Out on loan ===
Note: Flags indicate national team as defined under FIFA eligibility rules; some limited exceptions apply. Players may hold more than one non-FIFA nationality.

No.	Pos.	Nation	Player
9	FW	POR	Paulinho (at Académico de Viseu until 30 June 2027)

=== Notable players ===
Had international caps for their respective countries at any time. Players with names listed in bold represented their countries while playing for Wieczysta.

Poland

- (Poland) Jacek Góralski (2023–26)
- (Poland) Zbigniew Hnatio (1988)
- (Poland) Maciej Jankowski (2022–24)
- (Poland) Piotr Madejski (2019–22)
- (Poland) Radosław Majewski (2020–23)
- (Poland) Michał Miśkiewicz (2019–22)
- (Poland) Michał Pazdan (2023–26)
- (Poland) Sławomir Peszko (2020–23)
- (Poland) Rafał Pietrzak (2023–26)
- (Poland) Mateusz Wieteska (2026–)

Bulgaria

- (Bulgaria) Simeon Slavchev (2023–24)

Cape Verde

- (Cape Verde) Lisandro Semedo (2024–)

Croatia

- (Croatia) Antonio Milić (2026–)

Czech Republic

- (Czech Republic) Jakub Pešek (2025–26)

Greece

- (Greece) Efthymis Koulouris (2026–)

Haiti

- (Haiti) **Wilde-Donald Guerrier** (2021–22)

Slovakia

- (Slovakia) Patrik Mišák (2021–24)

Slovenia

- (Slovenia) Saša Živec (2023–24)

== Managerial history ==
Caretaker managers listed in italics.

- (Poland) Jerzy Warchala (January 2000 – June 2000)
- (Poland) Robert Orłowski (July 2000 – December 2000)
- (Poland) Leszek Walankiewicz (January 2000 – June 2001)
- (Poland) Zbigniew Wiącek (July 2001 – August 2001)
- (Poland) Maciej Podsiadło (September 2001 – September 2002)
- (Poland) Jerzy Warchala (September 2002 – March 2003)
- (Poland) Jacek Ścigalski (23 March 2003 – May 2003)
- (Poland) Mirosław Zając (May 2003 – September 2003)
- (Poland) Jerzy Warchala (September 2003 – June 2004)
- (Poland) Mirosław Zając (July 2004 – June 2006)
- (Poland) Henryk Śmiałek (June 2006 – August 2007)
- (Poland) Mariusz Wojtyga (August 2007 – December 2008)
- (Poland) Grzegorz Plata (January 2009 – September 2010)
- (Poland) Andrzej Michno (September 2010 – May 2011)
- (Poland) Krzysztof Durlik (May 2011 – December 2011)
- (Poland) Henryk Śmiałek (January 2012 – September 2012)
- (Poland) Tadeusz Piotrowski (3 September 2012 – March 2013)
- (Poland) Andrzej Rokicki (March 2013 – June 2014)
- (Poland) Mariusz Wojtyga (July 2014 – June 2015)
- (Poland) Michał Guja (July 2015 – July 2019)
- (Poland) Przemysław Cecherz (20 July 2019 – 2 June 2021)
- (Poland) Rafał Jędrszczyk (3 June 2021 – 30 June 2021)
- (Poland) Franciszek Smuda (1 July 2021 – 29 August 2022)
- (Poland) Rafał Jędrszczyk (29 August 2022 – 6 September 2022)
- (Poland) Dariusz Marzec (6 September 2022 – 20 March 2023)
- (Poland) Wojciech Łobodziński (21 March 2023 – 16 June 2023)
- (Poland) Maciej Musiał (1 July 2023 – 18 September 2023)
- (Poland) Sławomir Peszko (18 September 2023 – 18 April 2025)
- (Poland) Rafał Jędrszczyk (18 April 2025 – 1 May 2025)
- (Poland) Przemysław Cecherz (1 May 2025 – 5 October 2025)
- (Italy) Gino Lettieri (10 October 2025 – 3 November 2025)
- (Poland) Rafał Jędrszczyk (3 November 2025 – 24 November 2025)
- (Poland) Kazimierz Moskal (24 November 2025 – 22 August 2026)
- (Croatia) Željko Kopić (26 August 2026 – 7 November 2026)
- (Poland) Jacek Zieliński (10 November 2026 – present)

== Seasons ==
Season	Tier	Division	Place
1997–98	4	IV liga – group: Kraków, Nowy Sącz, Tarnów	5th
1998–99	4	IV liga – group: Kraków, Nowy Sącz, Tarnów	9th
1999–00	4	IV liga – group: Kraków, Nowy Sącz, Tarnów	12th
2000–01	4	IV liga – group: małopolska (Kraków)	11th
2001–02	4	IV liga – group: małopolska (Kraków)	14th
2002–03	4	IV liga – group: małopolska (Kraków)	18th ^{R}
2003–04	5	Liga okręgowa – group: Kraków	4th
2004–05	5	Liga okręgowa – group: Kraków	7th
2005–06	5	Liga okręgowa – group: Kraków	12th
2006–07	6	Liga okręgowa – group: Kraków	8th
2007–08	7	Liga okręgowa – group: Kraków	6th
2008–09	7	Liga okręgowa – group: Kraków	3rd
2009–10	7	Liga okręgowa – group: Kraków	9th
2010–11	7	Liga okręgowa – group: Kraków	8th
2011–12	6	Liga okręgowa – group: Kraków I	11th
2012–13	6	Liga okręgowa – group: Kraków I	14th
2013–14	6	Liga okręgowa – group: Kraków I	11th
2014–15	6	Liga okręgowa – group: Kraków I	13th ^{R}
2015–16	7	Klasa A – group: Kraków II	2nd
2016–17	7	Klasa A – group: Kraków II	1st ^{P}
2017–18	6	Liga okręgowa – group: Kraków II	11th
2018–19	6	Liga okręgowa – group: Kraków II	2nd
2019–20	6	Liga okręgowa – group: Kraków II	2nd
2020–21	6	Liga okręgowa – group: Kraków II	1st ^{P}
2021–22	5	IV liga – group: małopolska (West)	1st ^{P}
2022–23	4	III liga – group IV	3rd
2023–24	4	III liga – group IV	1st ^{P}
2024–25	3	II liga	3rd ^{P}
2025–26	2	I liga	3rd ^{P}
2026–27	1	Ekstraklasa	

Notes: P – Promoted, R – Relegated

== Polish Cup records ==
Season	Round	Opponent	Result
2021–22	First round	Chrobry Głogów	2–1
2021–22	Round of 32	Garbarnia Kraków	0–5
2022–23	First round	Radunia Stężyca	0–2
2023–24	First round	Piast Gliwice	0–4
2025–26	Preliminary round	Olimpia Grudziądz	0–0 (5–6 p)
2026–27	First round	Avia Świdnik	1–3
