= Górnik Wieliczka =

Polish football club

- Full name: Klub Sportowy Górnik Wieliczka
- Founded: 10 August 1947; 78 years ago (as Górniczy Związkowy Klub Sportowy Wieliczka)
- Ground: 6 Jan Daniłowicz Street Stadium
- Capacity: 1,200
- Chairman: Piotr Klimczyk
- Manager: Jarosław Juras
- League: Regional league Kraków III
- 2023–24: Regional league Kraków III, 4th of 14
- Website: https://gornikwieliczka.pl/

Górnik Wieliczka is a Polish football club based in Wieliczka, Lesser Poland Voivodeship. Górnik currently plays in the regional league.

It was founded in 1947 by the initiative of a group of salt mine workers. The first president of the club was Józef Kuszowski. The club's best league performance was finishing the 2008–09 II liga in fifth place - they withdrew after the end of the season but kept their position in the final table.

== See also ==
- Football in Poland
