= Cádiz CF =

Association football team in Spain

Cádiz
- Full name: Cádiz Club de Fútbol, S.A.D.
- Nicknames: Limoneros; Submarino Amarillo (Yellow Submarine)
- Short name: CAD
- Founded: 10 September 1910; 116 years ago as Cádiz Foot-ball Club
- Stadium: JP Financial Estadio
- Capacity: 20,724
- Owner(s): Locos por el Balón SL; Ben Harburg
- President: Christian Septien
- Head coach: Albert Celades
- League: Segunda División
- 2025–26: Segunda División, 18th of 22
- Website: cadizcf.com
Home colours	Away colours	Third colours

Cádiz Club de Fútbol, S.A.D. is a Spanish professional football club based in Cádiz, Andalusia. Founded in 1910, the club competes in Segunda División, holding home games at Nuevo Mirandilla, with a seating capacity of 20,724.

Salvadoran legend Mágico González played for the club during the 1980s and the early 1990s, and is widely recognized as the best player to ever play for the team.

Between 1929 and 1977, Cádiz played in either the second or third tier of Spanish football. In 1977, Cádiz achieved promotion to La Liga for the first time. Since then Cádiz has played sixteen seasons in the first tier, as well as spending several at the second level.

== History ==
The first documented game of Cádiz CF was played against Cádiz Sporting Club on Thursday, 8 September 1910. Cádiz CF won it 1–0. Two days later on 10 September 1910, several Cádiz citizens appealed to the Civil Government to register a club under the name Cádiz Foot-Ball Club. One of the founders was José Rivera y Lora, the first Cádiz president. A year later, in 1911, two other important events of Cádiz football took place: the foundation of the Español Foot-Ball Club and the inscription of Cádiz Foot-Ball Club to the Federación Sur (Southern Football Federation). The Civil War interrupted the organization of competitions and Cádiz CF only played friendly matches, among others, against teams such as Betis and Celta de Vigo.

Cádiz played the first complete season 1939–40 in Segunda División after the Spanish Civil War. The club finished 1st in the Group 5 with 11 wins in 14 games. That season the coach position was occupied by Santiago Núñez, who was also a player, and the key roles were played by Roldán, Díaz, Mateo, the goalkeeper Bueno, future Real Madrid player, and Camilo Liz, who decades later became the technical secretary of the club. During the following 3 seasons, Cádiz was far away from repeating that success. Cádiz first reached La Liga in 1977–78, after having spent two decades in the second division. The promoting materialized on 5 June 1977, with a 2–0 victory at Ramón de Carranza against Tarrasa. Relegated after just one season, the club returned in 1980, managing a further 13-year stay. In August 1981, before returning to La Liga, Cádiz won its first Ramón de Carranza Trophy. They beat Sevilla (led by coach Miguel Muñoz) 1–0 with the goal scored by Dieguito. Among them there were such important players in Cádiz history as Bocoya, Juan José, Hugo Vaca, Dos Santos, Amarillo, Luque, Linares, Pepe Mejías, Dieguito (Escobar), López (Choquet) and Mané.

Often led by the skills of Salvadoran Mágico González, the club managed to maintain its top flight status in the 1990–91 season, thanks to youth graduate Kiko (and 25 minutes of his inspiration against Real Zaragoza), who picked up the offensive burden after González left. During the late 1980s and early 1990s the club became known as "The Yellow Submarine", due to its capacity of "coming afloat" every year at the end of each season and remain in the top division, despite having been "sunk down" during most of the campaign.

However, in just two seasons, Cádiz dropped down two levels. In 1995 Cádiz was on the brink of extinction due to financial issues. The investment group no longer invested in the club and declared the suspension of payments. A group of cadistas, headed by Antonio Muñoz and Manuel García, had the negotiations with the creditors, reorganized the club and started managing it directly from the city of Cádiz. After a long spell in Segunda División B the club was finally promoted in 2003, spectacularly returning to the top level in 2005, after taking the championship with a last-day victory at neighbours Xerez CD. The match was played on 18 June 2005, and ended up with 2–0 Cádiz win in the presence of 8000 Cádiz fans, arrived in Xerez.

However, Cádiz was eventually relegated back to the second tier, in the 37th and penultimate matchday of 2005–06. Cádiz finished in the 19th position, 4 points away from 16th place, which could secure the club a place in La Liga. For the following campaign, former Spanish international Oli took the reins of the team, being sacked after only a few months. With him the club won just 4 from 11 matches.

In June 2008, Cádiz dropped another level returning to the Segunda División B. However, after just one season, it managed to return to the second division, but was immediately relegated in the 2009–10 campaign. Cádiz finished in 19th place, falling just one point behind the teams in 17th and 18th positions, which guaranteed them a place in the Segunda División. Performance of such experienced players as Raúl López, Andrés Fleurquin and Enrique Ortiz was the major asset to the successful 2008–09 season. Cádiz became the champion of the Segunda División B, having a successful season with 24 wins, 7 draws, and 7 losses in 38 matches. During the 2015–16 the club finished its season in Group 4 in 4th place and qualified for the promotion playoffs, they beat Racing Ferrol, Racing Santander and Hércules and therefore promoted back to Segunda División after 6 years. The key match against Hércules took place on 26 June 2016, at the Ramón de Carranza stadium. Cádiz won it 1–0.

Chart of Cádiz CF league performance 1929-2023

On 29 September 2019, Cádiz CF organized trials in Mumbai, India. For the second time, the club gave an opportunity to more than 250 Indian students to win a scholarship to live and train in Spain. As a result, three players were selected: Harshika Jain, Veer Gondal and Arnav Gorantala. Their stay in Spain began in January 2020.

In the beginning of the 2019–20 season, Cádiz repeated its best start record as per first ten league games of a single season. This record dates 80 years back to the 1939–1940 season. Head coach Álvaro Cervera admitted the good start of the season and said:

We are an uncomfortable team for others and we create many problems. We have already won ten games and we have to be proud of ourselves. Now we have to think that on Monday we have a training and we should remain the same way.

On 28 December 2019, Manuel Vizcaíno Fernández was appointed as chairman of the board of directors for the next six years, along with the directors Jorge Cobo and Martín José García Marichal.

On 2 March 2020, Cádiz CF confirmed that an unnamed American investor of great economic strength became one of the club's shareholders. Despite acquiring a minority of shares, the investor's goal is expanding his presence in the club and helping the Andalusian club with the promotion to La Liga. The president of the club Manuel Vizcaíno revealed the plans of using new resources to modernize the infrastructure, facilities and other areas of the club.

On 12 July 2020, Cádiz CF was promoted back to the Primera División after 14 years. On 20 September 2020 Cádiz won its first La Liga match (2:0 away win over Huesca) since the previous campaign in the league. On 5 December, Cádiz CF won a home game for the first time in the season, setting another historic moment in the process: in fact, goals by Álvaro Giménez and Álvaro Negredo secured a 2–1 final result against Barcelona. Plus, on 21 February 2021, they managed to block Barcelona once again, as the match ended up in a 1–1 draw: a penalty by substitute Álex Fernández equalized the initial opener by Lionel Messi (also from the penalty spot).

On 4 April 2021 in a league game Mouctar Diakhaby of Valencia denounced an alleged racist aggression by Cádiz defender Juan Cala. The game was briefly halted after Valencia players walked off the pitch. The tests carried out by LaLiga and the RFEF found no evidence for the complaint, so the judge declared Juan Cala innocent.

On 2 May 2021, Cádiz won 1–0 at Granada in Los Cármenes. With 40 points in the standings, Cádiz CF mathematically achieved survival in LaLiga Santander.

On 19 May 2024, Cádiz was relegated to second division after a 0–0 draw against Las Palmas, ending their four-year stay in the top tier.

In June 2024, Cádiz CF had 13.1 million followers on social media, making it one of the most-followed sports clubs in Spain.

== Culture ==
=== Supporters ===
Cádiz CF's supporter base has a well-documented history of left-wing political identity, though it is not monolithic. The most prominent organised fan group is the Brigadas Amarillas (Yellow Brigades), founded in the early 1980s. The group originated as a young anti-fascist collective called Frente Cadiz, which renamed itself Barra Ultra before settling on Brigadas Amarillas in 1982, partly to distance itself from the term "ultra," which carried right-wing connotations in Spain at the time. According to academic research, the Brigadas Amarillas identify anti-fascism and "Cadismo" (devotion to Cádiz FC) as their two foundational principles. A founding member named Guillermo, interviewed by the authors in 2005, described anti-fascism as central to the group's collective identity. Academics noted that solidarity among left-wing fan groups in Spanish football is built around three common causes: opposition to neo-fascism, opposition to racism, and opposition to the commercialisation of football. In the 1980s, the Brigadas grew substantially, becoming known for large away followings and political demonstrations, most notably against high unemployment in Cádiz province, which was among the most economically deprived areas in western Europe. This brought the group into violent conflict with local fascist factions, and arrests and fines reduced membership to between 20 and 30 people at points in the late 1980s. The group recovered in the 1990s, though the club's successive relegations in 1993 and 1994, which dropped it to the Spanish third division, complicated matters further. Around this period, the Brigadas developed a fraternal relationship with the Bukaneros, the organised left-wing fan group of Rayo Vallecano of Madrid. The bond was forged partly through encounters at the annual Ramón de Carranza pre-season tournament in Cádiz, where members of both groups found common ideological ground. The relationship has since become well known in Spanish football, described by the phrase "Sangre Gaditana en vena Vallecana" ("Cádiz blood in Vallecas veins").

The Brigadas have also engaged in formal anti-racism partnership work. From 2004 onwards, they collaborated with the NGO Colectivo de Prevención e Inserción Social Andalucía (CEPA) on initiatives including a 2006 project called "Cádiz against racism," which sought to promote intercultural awareness among supporters and local residents. CEPA representatives, interviewed in 2005, described left-wing fan groups as the most proactive partners in anti-racism work, while acknowledging that some of their methods involved violence. The Brigadas also participated in European anti-racism networks, including Football Against Racism in Europe (FARE) action weeks and the Mondiali Antirazzisti tournament in Italy.

Academic research has noted internal tensions within the group regarding the use of violence. Members of the Vieja Guardia (old guard) tended to view violence as necessary and effective, while younger or reform-minded members questioned this. One member named Pedro (identified as being in his late thirties in 2005) acknowledged that some individuals "have been using violence for the sake of violence," and described a personal shift toward grassroots education and awareness activities. Another member, José, described the group's internal structure as deliberately non-hierarchical and "anarchist" in character, with horizontal relationships among members.

Outside the football context, the Brigadas maintained links with the squatter and Self-managed social center movement. In January 2012, Cádiz fans displayed banners at the Ramón de Carranza stadium in support of the Centro Social Recuperado Valcárcel, a reclaimed autonomous social centre in the city whose closure by authorities they opposed.

The broader political character of Cádiz city has reinforced this left-wing fan identity. Between 2015 and 2023, the city's mayor was Kichi González of the Izquierda Anticapitalista (Anti-Capitalist Left), who is himself a Cádiz fan. His partner, Teresa Rodríguez, publicly declared herself a supporter of the Brigadas in late 2018, provoking a hostile response from sections of the Spanish right. Cádiz province was also a centre of resistance to Francoism, with the Spanish Maquis conducting their first recorded guerrilla action there in January 1940.

Not all Cádiz supporters identify with this left-wing tradition. An apolitical fan group, Hinchas Carranza, whose co-founder, Alberto (interviewed in 2005) described a cordial but politically complicated relationship with the Brigadas. He noted that an apolitical stance made it difficult to build alliances, as both left-wing and right-wing groups tended to regard the apolitical position with suspicion.

The fan base has also been divided more recently over the naming of the club's stadium. The ground was known for decades as the Estadio Ramón de Carranza, named after a former mayor of Cádiz who supported the 1936 military coup led by Francisco Franco. Following a low-turnout referendum, the name was changed to Estadio Nuevo Mirandilla in 2021 by the then left-wing city government. In July 2024, Cádiz CF and the current right-wing municipal government reversed this, renaming the ground Estadio Carranza. Left-wing supporters and a fan platform called Carranza Incumple argued this contravened Spain's Democratic Memory Law, while the club and a rival fan platform called Estadio Carranza defended the change as a tribute to collective Cádiz identity. The Spanish Ministry of Territorial Policy and Democratic Memory expressed criticism of the change in writing.

== Individual records ==
=== Most appearances ===
Rank	Player	Nationality	Apps
1	Raúl López	Spain	400
2	Chico Linares	Spain	354
3	Pepe Mejías	Spain	345
4	José Manuel Barla	Spain	341
5	Ricardo Escobar	Spain	303
6	Mané	Spain	300
7	Juan Jose	Spain	295
8	Antonio Amarillo	Spain	291
9	Manolito	Spain	289
10	Alex Fernandez	Spain	289

=== Top goalscorers ===
Rank	Player	Nationality	Goals
1	Paco Baena	Spain	82
2	Mágico González	El Salvador	75
3	Pollito Roldán	Spain	72
4	Pepe Mejías	Spain	71
5	Adolfo Bolea	Spain	54
6	Tarro	Spain	54
7	Jesús Lorente	Spain	50
8	Mané	Spain	50
9	Ricardo Ibáñez	Spain	48
10	Machicha	Spain	44
11	Enrique Ortiz	Spain	44

== Season to season ==
Season	Tier	Division	Place	Copa del Rey
1935–36	2	2ª	7th	Group round
1939–40	2	2ª	1st	
1940–41	2	2ª	8th	First round
1941–42	2	2ª	3rd	
1942–43	2	2ª	7th	
1943–44	3	3ª	10th	Third round
1944–45	4	1ª Reg.	1st	
1945–46	3	3ª	8th	
1946–47	3	3ª	2nd	
1947–48	3	3ª	5th	Third round
1948–49	3	3ª	5th	Third round
1949–50	3	3ª	8th	
1950–51	3	3ª	8th	
1951–52	3	3ª	4th	
1952–53	3	3ª	3rd	
1953–54	3	3ª	3rd	
1954–55	3	3ª	1st	
1955–56	2	2ª	14th	
1956–57	2	2ª	12th	
1957–58	2	2ª	10th	

Season	Tier	Division	Place	Copa del Rey
1958–59	2	2ª	7th	Round of 16
1959–50	2	2ª	14th	First round
1960–61	2	2ª	4th	First round
1961–62	2	2ª	10th	First round
1962–63	2	2ª	4th	Round of 32
1963–64	2	2ª	7th	First round
1964–65	2	2ª	14th	First round
1965–66	2	2ª	12th	First round
1966–67	2	2ª	8th	Round of 32
1967–68	2	2ª	5th	First round
1968–69	2	2ª	18th	
1969–70	3	3ª	1st	Round of 32
1970–71	2	2ª	12th	Third round
1971–72	2	2ª	16th	Fourth round
1972–73	2	2ª	7th	Fourth round
1973–74	2	2ª	5th	Third round
1974–75	2	2ª	5th	Fourth round
1975–76	2	2ª	13th	Round of 32
1976–77	2	2ª	2nd	Third round
1977–78	1	1ª	18th	Round of 16

Season	Tier	Division	Place	Copa del Rey
1978–79	2	2ª	8th	Fourth round
1979–80	2	2ª	8th	Second round
1980–81	2	2ª	2nd	Third round
1981–82	1	1ª	16th	Second round
1982–83	2	2ª	2nd	Round of 16
1983–84	1	1ª	16th	Second round
1984–85	2	2ª	2nd	Round of 16
1985–86	1	1ª	15th	Second round
1986–87	1	1ª	18th	Round of 16
1987–88	1	1ª	12th	Round of 16
1988–89	1	1ª	15th	Quarter-finals
1989–90	1	1ª	15th	Semi-finals
1990–91	1	1ª	18th	Round of 16
1991–92	1	1ª	18th	Third round
1992–93	1	1ª	19th	Fourth round
1993–94	2	2ª	20th	Fourth round
1994–95	3	2ª B	10th	Second round
1995–96	3	2ª B	6th	
1996–97	3	2ª B	7th	
1997–98	3	2ª B	3rd	

Season	Tier	Division	Place	Copa del Rey
1998–99	3	2ª B	5th	Second round
1999–2000	3	2ª B	12th	Preliminary round
2000–01	3	2ª B	1st	
2001–02	3	2ª B	7th	Round of 64
2002–03	3	2ª B	4th	
2003–04	2	2ª	7th	Round of 32
2004–05	2	2ª	1st	Round of 32
2005–06	1	1ª	19th	Quarter-finals
2006–07	2	2ª	5th	Third round
2007–08	2	2ª	20th	Third round
2008–09	3	2ª B	1st	First round
2009–10	2	2ª	19th	Second round
2010–11	3	2ª B	4th	Third round
2011–12	3	2ª B	1st	Round of 32
2012–13	3	2ª B	13th	Second round
2013–14	3	2ª B	3rd	
2014–15	3	2ª B	1st	Round of 32
2015–16	3	2ª B	4th	Round of 16
2016–17	2	2ª	5th	Third round
2017–18	2	2ª	9th	Round of 16

Season	Tier	Division	Place	Copa del Rey
2018–19	2	2ª	7th	Round of 32
2019–20	2	2ª	2nd	Second round
2020–21	1	1ª	12th	Round of 32
2021–22	1	1ª	17th	Quarter-finals
2022–23	1	1ª	14th	First round
2023–24	1	1ª	18th	Second round
2024–25	2	2ª	13th	Second round
2025–26	2	2ª	18th	Second round
2026–27	2	2ª		TBD

- 16 seasons in La Liga
- 44 seasons in Segunda División
- 16 seasons in Segunda División B
- 12 seasons in Tercera División
- 1 season in Categorías Regionales

== Current squad ==
As of 3 September 2026

Note: Flags indicate national team as defined under FIFA eligibility rules; some limited exceptions apply. Players may hold more than one non-FIFA nationality.

No.	Pos.	Nation	Player
1	GK	ESP	David Gil (captain)
2	DF	ESP	Beñat de Jesús
3	DF	ESP	Sergio Arribas
4	DF	ESP	Javi Castro
5	MF	FRA	Marc-Olivier Doué
6	DF	ESP	Manu Fernández
7	FW	GEO	Iuri Tabatadze
8	FW	NGR	Efe Aghama
9	FW	ESP	Álvaro García Pascual
10	FW	ESP	Javi Ontiveros
11	MF	ESP	José Antonio de la Rosa
12	DF	GEO	Giorgi Gocholeishvili (on loan from Shakhtar Donetsk)
13	GK	ESP	Jokin Ezkieta (on loan from Racing Santander)
14	DF	SRB	Bojan Kovačević

No.	Pos.	Nation	Player
15	DF	COM	Kenan Toibibou
16	MF	ESP	Antonio Cordero (on loan from Newcastle United)
17	MF	MAR	Aïmen Moueffek (on loan from Saint-Étienne)
18	MF	ESP	Jandro Orellana
19	FW	ESP	Urko Izeta
20	FW	ESP	Borja Vázquez
21	FW	UKR	Vladys Kopotun
22	DF	ESP	Cristian Gutiérrez (on loan from Las Palmas)
23	MF	ESP	Damián Rodríguez (on loan from Celta)
24	MF	ESP	Ibon Sánchez
25	FW	URU	Gonzalo Petit (on loan from Betis)
26	GK	ESP	Rubén Domínguez
27	DF	ESP	Juan Díaz
28	MF	ESP	Dilan Zárate (on loan from Inter Milan)

=== Reserve team ===
Note: Flags indicate national team as defined under FIFA eligibility rules; some limited exceptions apply. Players may hold more than one non-FIFA nationality.

No.	Pos.	Nation	Player
30	DF	ESP	César Díaz
31	DF	FRA	Noah Ukwuije

No.	Pos.	Nation	Player
32	DF	ESP	Robe Rosado
33	DF	ESP	Manu Rivera

=== Other players under contract ===
Note: Flags indicate national team as defined under FIFA eligibility rules; some limited exceptions apply. Players may hold more than one non-FIFA nationality.

No.	Pos.	Nation	Player
—	MF	ESP	José Andújar

=== Out on loan ===
Note: Flags indicate national team as defined under FIFA eligibility rules; some limited exceptions apply. Players may hold more than one non-FIFA nationality.

No.	Pos.	Nation	Player
—	MF	ESP	Joaquín González (at Ceuta until 30 June 2027)
—	MF	MLI	Moussa Diakité (at Çaykur Rizespor until 30 June 2027)
—	MF	MLI	Yussi Diarra (at Córdoba until 30 June 2027)

No.	Pos.	Nation	Player
—	FW	ESP	Ismael Álvarez (at Rayo Majadahonda until 30 June 2027)
—	FW	ARG	Jerónimo Dómina (at Tigre until 30 June 2027)

=== Current technical staff ===
Position	Staff
Manager	(Spain) Albert Celades
Assistant manager	Vacant
Fitness coach	(Spain) Edu de la Pascua (Spain) Rodrigo Bianchi (Spain) Álex Fernández
Goalkeeping coach	(Spain) José Manuel Santisteban
Analyst	(Spain) Fran Muñoz
Technical assistant	(Spain) Servando Sánchez
Materials manager	(Spain) Juanito Marchante
Equipment manager	(Spain) Coque López
Doctor	(Spain) Juan Jesús Rodríguez (Spain) Antonio Luis Pérez
Physiotherapist	(Spain) Diego Santos (Spain) Manuel García (Spain) Pablo Fernández (Spain) Rubén Pedregosa
Rehab fitness coach	(Spain) Borja González (Spain) José María Azores
Nutritionist	(Spain) José Villegas

Last updated: 11 August 2026

== Honours ==
Segunda División: 1: 2004–05

== Stadium information ==
- Name: Nuevo Mirandilla
- City: Cádiz
- Capacity: 25,033
- Inauguration: 1955
- Pitch size: 106 x 68 m

== Famous players ==
Note: this list includes players that have appeared in at least 100 league games and/or have reached international status.

- (Spain) Adolfo Bolea
- (Spain) Manuel Botubot
- (Spain) Juan Villar
- (Spain) Alberto Cifuentes
- (Argentina) Hugo Vaca
- (Spain) Carlos Caballero
- (Spain) Armando Riveiro
- (Spain) Francisco Baena
- (Spain) Carmelo Navarro
- (Spain) Diego Tristán
- (Spain) Bocoya
- (Spain) Dani Güiza
- (Spain) Oli
- (Spain) Enrique
- (Spain) Ángel Férez
- (Spain) Juan José
- (Spain) Kiko Narváez
- (Spain) Raúl López
- (Spain) Pepe Mejías
- (Spain) Salvador Mejías
- (Spain) Migueli
- (Spain) Raúl
- (Spain) José Ramón Bermell
- (El Salvador) Mágico González
- (Hungary) József Szendrei
- (Spain) Moisés Arteaga
- (Spain) José María Quevedo
- (Spain) Ramón de Quintana
- (Nigeria) Bartholomew Ogbeche
- (Spain) Ricardo Escobar
- (Spain) Jonathan Sesma
- (Armenia) Varazdat Haroyan
- (Spain) Juan Ramón Carrasco
- (Spain) Jon Ander Garrido
- (Gibraltar) Anthony Hernandez
- (Gibraltar) Nicholas Pozo

== Coaches ==
Tenure	Coach
1935–36	(Spain) Jose Rey
1936	(Spain) Aurelio Omist
1939–40	(Spain) Santiago Núñez
1940	(Spain) Manuel Valderrama
1940–41	(Spain) Santiago Núñez
1941	(Spain) Miguel Ángel Valcárcel
1941–42	(Spain) José Quirante
1942	(Spain) Teodoro Mauri
1942–44	(Spain) Santiago Buiría
1944–46	(Spain) Juan Bejarano
1946–48	(Spain) Gabriel Andonegui
1948–49	(Spain) Anastasio Calleja
1949–50	(Spain) Casto Moliné
1950–51	(Spain) Jose Peralta
1951	(Spain) Juan Bejarano
1951–52	(Spain) Camilo Liz
1952–53	(Chile) Higinio Ortúzar
1953–54	(Spain) Anastasio Calleja
1954–56	(Spain) Diego Villalonga
1956–June 1958	(Spain) Santiago Núñez
July 1958–November 1958	(Spain) Valdor Sierra
November 1958–December 1958	(Spain) Antonio Fernández
December 1958–June 1959	(Spain) Julián Arcas
July 1959–February 1960	(Spain) Camilo Liz
February 1960	(Spain) Juan Bejarano
February 1960–June 1960	(Spain) Diego Villalonga
July 1960–June 1963	(Spain) José Luis Riera
July 1963–December 1963	(Spain) Casimiro Benavente
December 1963	(Spain) Luis de Miguel
December 1963–June 1965	(Spain) José Valera
July 1965–June 1969	(Spain) Julio Vilariño
July 1969–May 1971	(Spain) León Lasa
May 1971–June 1971	(Peru) Guillermo Delgado
July 1971–October 1971	(Spain) José María García de Andoín
October 1971–December 1971	(Czechoslovakia) Ferdinand Daučík
December 1971–February 1972	(Spain) Adolfo Bolea
February 1972–June 1972	(Spain) José Antonio Naya
July 1972–June 1974	(Spain) Domènec Balmanya
July 1974–October 1975	(Spain) Sabino Barinaga
October 1975–February 1976	(Spain) Juan Arza
February 1976–June 1976	(Spain) Adolfo Bolea
June 1976	(Spain) Luis Escarti
July 1976–October 1977	(Spain) Enrique Mateos
October 1977–November 1977	(Spain) Luis Escarti
November 1977–June 1978	(Spain) Mariano Moreno
July 1978–June 1980	(Argentina) Roque Olsen
July 1980–December 1983	(Socialist Federal Republic of Yugoslavia) Dragoljub Milošević
December 1983	(Spain) Luis Escarti
January 1984–June 1985	(Spain) Benito Joanet
July 1985–April 1986	(Spain) Paquito
April 1986–June 1986	(Spain) David Vidal
July 1986–March 1987	(Spain) Manolo Cardo

Tenure	Coach
Mar 1987–June 1987	(Socialist Federal Republic of Yugoslavia) Dragoljub Milošević
June 1987	(Spain) David Vidal
July 1987–June 1988	(Uruguay) Víctor Espárrago
July 1988–October 1988	(Austria) Helmut Senekowitsch
October 1988–Mar 1990	(Spain) David Vidal
Mar 1990–June 1990	(England) Colin Addison
July 1990–April 1991	(Argentina) Héctor Veira
April 1991–June 1992	(Spain) Ramón Blanco
July 1992–January 1993	(Spain) José Luis Romero
January 1993–June 1993	(Spain) Ramón Blanco
July 1993–October 1993	(England) Colin Addison
October 1993–November 1993	(Argentina) Hugo Vaca
November 1993–January 1994	(Spain) José Antonio Naya
January 1994–June 1994	(Spain) Marcelino Pérez
July 1994–June 1995	(Argentina) Ramón Heredia
July 1995–October 1995	(Spain) Paco Chaparro
October 1995–June 1996	(Spain) Chico Linares
July 1996–December 1996	(Spain) Juan Carlos Álvarez
December 1996–June 1998	(Spain) Ramón Blanco
July 1998–September 1998	(Spain) Ismael Díaz
September 1998–November 1998	(Spain) Juan Antonio Sánchez
November 1998–June 1999	(Spain) Jordi Gonzalvo
July 1999–December 1999	(Spain) Chico Linares
January 2000–March 2000	(Spain) Juan Antonio Sánchez
March 2000–June 2000	(Spain) Emilio Cruz
July 2000–June 2001	(Spain) Carlos Orúe
July 2001–October 2001	(Spain) Pepe Escalante
October 2001–December 2001	(Spain) Juan Antonio Sánchez
December 2001–April 2002	(Spain) José Enrique Díaz
April 2002–June 2002	(Spain) Juan Antonio Sánchez
July 2002–June 2004	(Spain) José Manuel González
July 2004–June 2006	(Uruguay) Víctor Espárrago
July 2006–November 2006	(Spain) Oli
November 2006–June 2007	(Spain) José Manuel González
July 2007–October 2007	(Spain) Mariano García Remón
October 2007–April 2008	(Spain) Antonio Calderón
April 2008–May 2008	(Spain) Raúl Procopio
May 2008–June 2008	(Spain) Julián Rubio
July 2008–January 2010	(Spain) Javi Gracia
January 2010–June 2010	(Uruguay) Víctor Espárrago
July 2010–November 2010	(Bosnia and Herzegovina) Risto Vidaković
November 2010–June 2012	(Spain) José Manuel González
July 2012–November 2012	(Spain) Alberto Monteagudo
November 2012–December 2012	(Spain) Ramón Blanco
December 2012–March 2014	(Spain) Raül Agné
March 2014–November 2014	(Spain) Antonio Calderón
November 2014–April 2016	(Spain) Claudio Barragán
April 2016–January 2022	(Spain) Álvaro Cervera
January 2022–January 2024	(Spain) Sergio González
January 2024–June 2024	(Argentina) Mauricio Pellegrino
June 2024–present	(Spain) Paco López

== Kit suppliers and shirt sponsors ==
Period	Kit manufacturer	Shirt sponsors
1910–1985	None	None
1985–1986	Meyba	None
1986–1989	Massana	None
1989–1990	Massana	La Mar de Cerca Tours
1992–1993	Elements	Unicaja
1997–2000	Kelme	None
2000–2001	Kelme	Diario de Cádiz
2002–2003	Kelme	Financa
2003–2005	Kelme	Grupo Zona Franca Cádiz
2005–2006	Kelme	Caja San Fernando
2006–2007	Kelme	Armoniza
2007–2008	None	Teka
2008–2009	Diadora	None
2009–2010	Kelme	La Pepa 2012
2010–2011	Kelme	None
2013–2014	Erreà	Gagá Milano
2014–2015	Erreà	Solver
2016–2017	Adidas	Socibus
2017–2020	Adidas	Torrot
2020–2021	Adidas	Dafabet
2021–2022	Macron	Bitci
2022-	Macron	Khalifa Capital
