= Cádiz CF Mirandilla =

Spanish football club

Cádiz Mirandilla
- Full name: Cádiz Club de Fútbol, S.A.D. Mirandilla
- Nickname: El Submarino
- Founded: June 1973; 53 years ago
- Ground: Ciudad Deportiva Bahía de Cádiz, Cádiz, Spain
- Capacity: 3,500
- President: Manuel Vizcaíno
- Head coach: Pedro Mateos
- League: Tercera Federación – Group 10
- 2025–26: Tercera Federación – Group 10, 7th of 18
Home colours	Away colours

Cádiz Club de Fútbol Mirandilla is a Spanish football team based in Cádiz, in the autonomous community of Andalusia. It is the reserve team of Cádiz CF. Founded in 1973, it currently plays in Tercera Federación – Group 10, holding home games at Estadio Ramón Blanco, with a 1,700-seat capacity.

On 16 June 2022, Cádiz B was renamed to Cádiz CF Mirandilla, as an honour to Mirandilla FC, the name of the first team between 1924 and 1936. The club also operates a C team, having absorbed local side Balón de Cádiz in 2023. Cádiz C is still referred to as Balón de Cádiz in club media.

== Season to season ==
- As a farm team

Season	Tier	Division	Place	Copa del Rey
1973–74	5	2ª Reg.	8th	
1974–75	5	2ª Reg.	6th	
1975–76	4	Reg. Pref.	7th	
1976–77	4	Reg. Pref.	14th	
1977–78	5	Reg. Pref.	15th	
1978–79	5	Reg. Pref.	10th	
1979–80	5	Reg. Pref.	13th	
1980–81	5	Reg. Pref.	16th	
1981–82	5	Reg. Pref.	14th	

Season	Tier	Division	Place	Copa del Rey
1982–83	5	Reg. Pref.	17th	
1983–84	5	Reg. Pref.	2nd	
1984–85	5	Reg. Pref.	2nd	
1985–86	4	3ª	9th	
1986–87	4	3ª	5th	
1987–88	4	3ª	4th	
1988–89	4	3ª	6th	
1989–90	4	3ª	14th	
1990–91	4	3ª	1st	

- As a reserve team

Season	Tier	Division	Place
1991–92	4	3ª	16th
1992–93	4	3ª	8th
1993–94	4	3ª	8th
1994–95	4	3ª	10th
1995–96	4	3ª	16th
1996–97	4	3ª	14th
1997–98	4	3ª	18th
1998–99	5	Reg. Pref.	1st
1999–2000	5	Reg. Pref.	2nd
2000–01	5	Reg. Pref.	3rd
2001–02	5	Reg. Pref.	1st
2002–03	5	Reg. Pref.	4th
2003–04	5	Reg. Pref.	1st
2004–05	4	3ª	17th
2005–06	4	3ª	8th
2006–07	4	3ª	9th
2007–08	4	3ª	11th
2008–09	4	3ª	13th
2009–10	4	3ª	10th
2010–11	4	3ª	15th

Season	Tier	Division	Place
2011–12	4	3ª	9th
2012–13	4	3ª	11th
2013–14	4	3ª	11th
2014–15	4	3ª	20th
2015–16	5	1ª And.	2nd
2016–17	5	Div. Hon.	1st
2017–18	4	3ª	1st
2018–19	4	3ª	1st
2019–20	3	2ª B	11th
2020–21	3	2ª B	6th
2021–22	4	2ª RFEF	7th
2022–23	4	2ª Fed.	11th
2023–24	4	2ª Fed.	12th
2024–25	4	2ª Fed.	15th
2025–26	5	3ª Fed.	7th
2026–27	5	3ª Fed.	

- 2 seasons in Segunda División B
- 4 seasons in Segunda Federación/Segunda División RFEF
- 26 seasons in Tercera División
- 2 seasons in Tercera Federación

== Honours ==
- Tercera División: 1990–91, 2017–18

== Current squad ==
As of 4 October 2026

Note: Flags indicate national team as defined under FIFA eligibility rules; some limited exceptions apply. Players may hold more than one non-FIFA nationality.

No.	Pos.	Nation	Player
1	GK	ESP	Rubén Rubio
2	DF	ESP	Lucas Palma
3	DF	ESP	Robe Rosado
5	DF	ESP	Manu Rivera
6	MF	ESP	David Barroso
7	MF	ESP	Moi Machuca
8	MF	ESP	Iván Pajarón
9	FW	CMR	Hervé Ngono
10	FW	ESP	Marlon Pérez
11	FW	ESP	Paul Kattah
14	DF	ESP	César Díaz
16	MF	ESP	Nacho Pérez

No.	Pos.	Nation	Player
17	FW	ESP	Abel Muiños
18	MF	ESP	Iván Peinado
19	FW	ESP	Juan Gabriel Robles
20	FW	ESP	Hugo Arrebola
21	FW	ESP	Manu Sesé
22	FW	ESP	Ismael Tinoco
24	DF	ESP	Álex Beltrán
26	GK	ESP	Aitor García
—	DF	ESP	Hilarion Fernández
—	DF	FRA	Noah Ukwuije
—	MF	ESP	Moussa Diawara

=== Reserve team ===
Note: Flags indicate national team as defined under FIFA eligibility rules; some limited exceptions apply. Players may hold more than one non-FIFA nationality.

No.	Pos.	Nation	Player
27	DF	NGR	Patrick Chigbata
28	MF	ESP	Samuel Corzo
29	FW	ESP	Álvaro Santana
32	DF	ESP	Javi García

No.	Pos.	Nation	Player
33	FW	GUF	Bryan Bragance
34	DF	ESP	Dani Gil
36	GK	ESP	Dani Cubillana

=== Current technical staff ===
Position	Staff
Head coach	(Spain) Rubio
Assistant coach	(Spain) Servando Sánchez
Fitness coach	(Spain) Mario Landi
Goalkeeping coach	(Spain) Vega
Match delegate	(Spain) Juan Carlos Cerejido
Head of kit man	(Spain) Jesuli Sánchez

Last updated: 8 April 2026
